= Lauwersmeer National Park =

Protected area in the Netherlands

- Nationaal Park Lauwersmeer
- IUCN category II (national park)
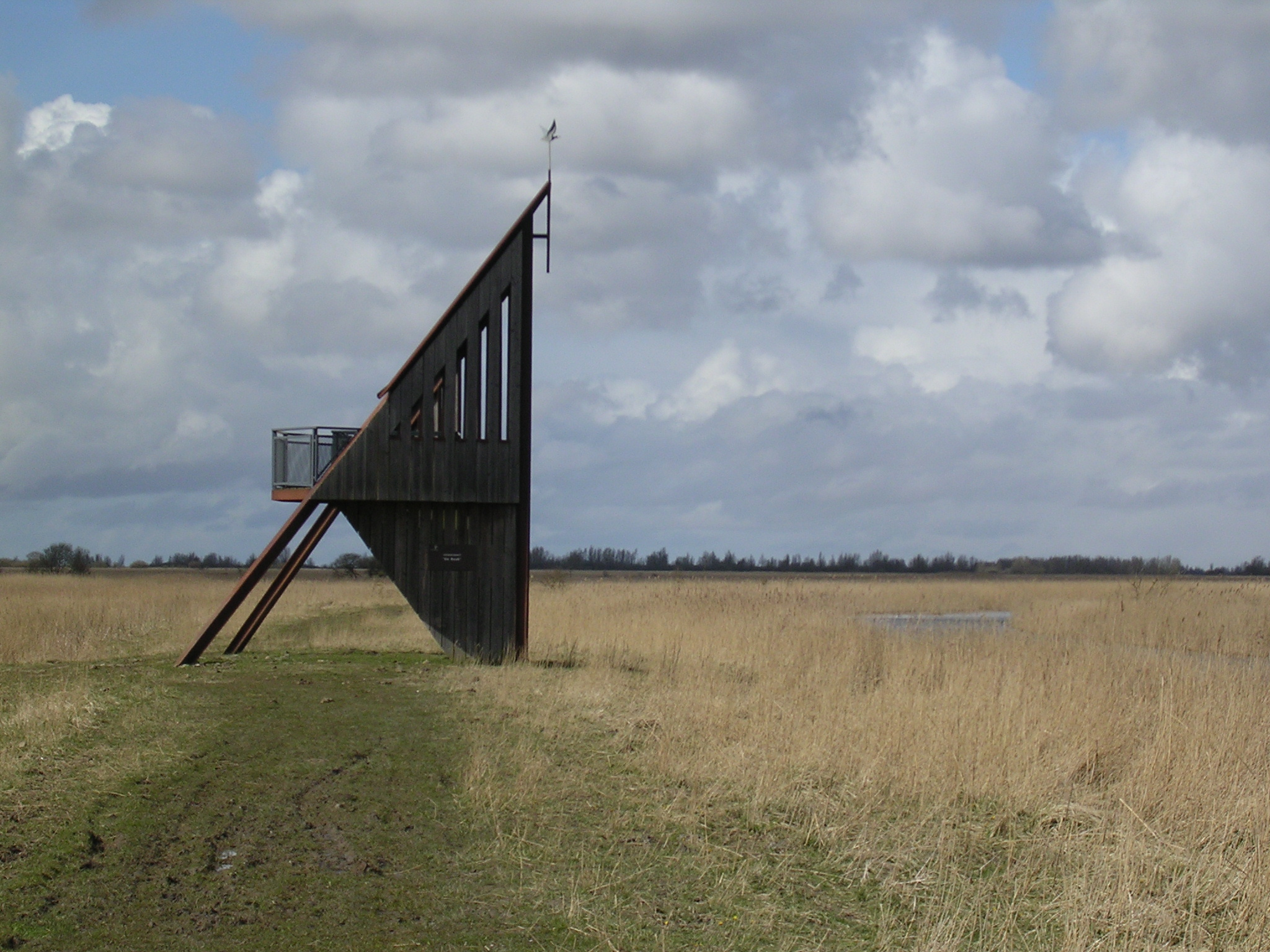
- De Baak lookout in April 2008

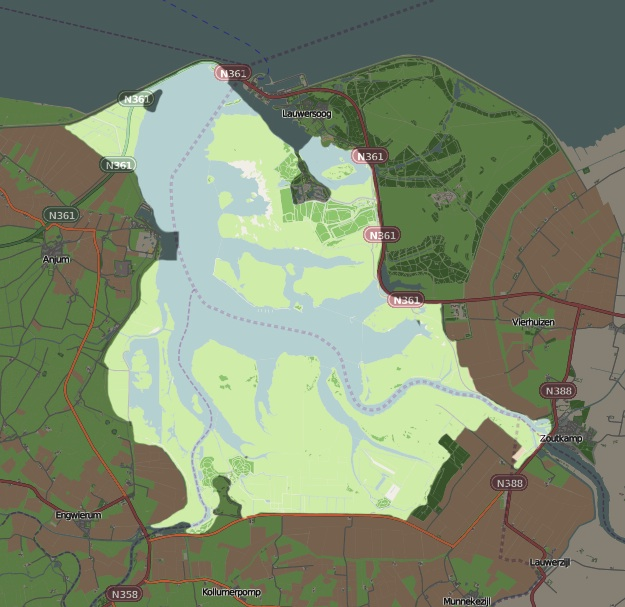
- Map of the National Park
- Location: Friesland/Groningen, Netherlands
- Coordinates: 53.364°N 6.200°E
- Area: 60 km^{2} (23 sq mi)
- Established: 2003
- Governing body: Staatsbosbeheer
- Website: www.np-lauwersmeer.nl

Ramsar Wetland
- Official name: Lauwersmeer
- Designated: 29 August 2000
- Reference no.: 1247

Lauwersmeer National Park (Dutch: Nationaal Park Lauwersmeer) is a national park in the provinces of Friesland and Groningen in the Netherlands. It consists of the southern and eastern parts of the Lauwersmeer (previously Lauwerszee). As part of the Dutch Wadden Sea Conservation Area, it was inscribed on the UNESCO World Heritage List for its outstanding biodiversity and its large, relatively pristine intertidal ecosystem.

== Geography ==
In the north of the Netherlands, the Lauwers river forms part of the east-west border between the provinces of Friesland and Groningen. The Lauwers flows from south to north into the Wadden Sea. The Lauwersmeer is its estuary, which is connected to the sea via a sluice at Lauwersoog. The national park consists of most of the Lauwersmeer and is situated in the Frisian municipalities of Dongeradeel and Kollumerland c.a. in Friesland and the Groningen municipality of De Marne.

== History ==
On 25 May 1969, the Lauwers Sea was enclosed and separated from the Wadden Sea, since then it has been called Lauwersmeer.

The Lauwersmeer gradually became a freshwater lake and new flora and fauna appeared. To protect this new and young nature area, the Lauwersmeer became a national park on 12 November 2003.

== Fauna and flora ==
Among the flora are the purple Dactylorhiza maculata and the white Parnassia.

Among the birds living in the area are the Eurasian Spoonbill, the Montagu's Harrier, the Bearded Reedling, and the Bluethroat. For the winter, hundred thousands of birds migrate to the area, like the Eurasian Wigeon, the Tundra Swan, and the Barnacle Goose.

To keep the landscape open, big grazers are used like the Konik horses and Highland cattle, besides normal horses and cows.
