= 2021 Healthy Ageing Tour =

Race details
- Dates: 10–12 March 2021
- Stages: 3
- Distance: 255.5 km (158.8 mi)
- Winning time: 7h 08' 38"

Results
Jersey awarded to the overall winner	Winner	Ellen van Dijk (NED)	(Trek–Segafredo)
	Second	Lisa Brennauer (GER)	(Ceratizit–WNT Pro Cycling)
	Third	Emma Norsgaard Jørgensen (DEN)	(Movistar Team)
Jersey awarded to the points classification winner	Points	Amy Pieters (NED)	(SD Worx)
Jersey awarded to the mountains classification winner	Mountains	Lonneke Uneken (NED)	(SD Worx)
Jersey awarded to the young rider classification winner	Young rider	Emma Norsgaard Jørgensen (DEN)	(Movistar Team)
Jersey awarded to the combination classification winner	Combination	Ellen van Dijk (NED)	(Trek–Segafredo)
Jersey awarded to the sprints classification winner	Sprints	Gudrun Stock (GER)	(Germany)
	Team	SD Worx	

The 2021 Healthy Ageing Tour was a women's cycle stage race that was held in the Netherlands from 10 to 12 March 2021. The 2021 edition of the race was the tenth running of the Healthy Ageing Tour, being held with a UCI rating of 2.1.

== Teams ==
Six UCI Women's WorldTeams, eight UCI Women's Continental Teams, and two UCI Women's National Teams made up the seventeen teams that participated in the race. Only the German national team and Team Jumbo–Visma did not enter the maximum of six riders, as they each entered five. 94 riders started the race, of which 34 finished.

UCI Women's WorldTeams

- Canyon//SRAM
- FDJ Nouvelle-Aquitaine Futuroscope
- Movistar Team
- SD Worx
- Team DSM
- Trek–Segafredo

UCI Women's Continental Teams

- Andy Schleck–CP NVST–Immo Losch
- CAMS–Tifosi
- Ceratizit–WNT Pro Cycling
- Drops–Le Col
- GT Krush Tunap
- NXTG Racing
- Parkhotel Valkenburg
- Team Jumbo–Visma

UCI Women's National Teams

- Germany
- Netherlands

== Route ==
Stage characteristics and winners
Stage	Date	Route	Distance	Type	Winner	Team
1	10 March	TT Circuit Assen to TT Circuit Assen	126 km (78 mi)	Flat stage	Jolien d'Hoore (BEL)	SD Worx
2	11 March	Lauwersoog to Lauwersoog	14.4 km (8.9 mi)	Individual time trial	Ellen van Dijk (NED)	Trek–Segafredo
3	12 March	Wijster to Wijster	115.1 km (71.5 mi)	Flat stage	Lonneke Uneken (NED)	SD Worx
Total			255.5 km (158.8 mi)			

== Stages ==
=== Stage 1 ===
10 March 2021 — TT Circuit Assen to TT Circuit Assen, 126 km (78 mi)

Stage 1 Result
Rank	Rider	Team	Time
1	Jolien D'Hoore (BEL)	SD Worx	3h 14' 03"
2	Alice Barnes (GBR)	Canyon//SRAM	+ 0"
3	Karlijn Swinkels (NED)	Team Jumbo–Visma	+ 0"
4	Anna Henderson (GBR)	Team Jumbo–Visma	+ 0"
5	Charlotte Kool (NED)	NXTG Racing	+ 0"
6	Amy Pieters (NED)	SD Worx	+ 0"
7	Georgia Danford (NZL)	Andy Schleck–CP NVST–Immo Losch	+ 0"
8	Daniek Hengeveld (NED)	GT Krush Tunap	+ 0"
9	Marjolein van't Geloof (NED)	Drops–Le Col	+ 0"
10	Amber van der Hulst (NED)	Parkhotel Valkenburg	+ 0"

General classification after Stage 1
Rank	Rider	Team	Time
1	Jolien D'Hoore (BEL)	SD Worx	3h 13' 53"
2	Alice Barnes (GBR)	Canyon//SRAM	+ 4"
3	Lisa Brennauer (GER)	Ceratizit–WNT Pro Cycling	+ 5"
4	Karlijn Swinkels (NED)	Team Jumbo–Visma	+ 6"
5	Amy Pieters (NED)	SD Worx	+ 7"
6	Emma Norsgaard Jørgensen (DEN)	Movistar Team	+ 7"
7	Léna Mettraux (SUI)	Andy Schleck–CP NVST–Immo Losch	+ 7"
8	Joscelin Lowden (GBR)	Drops–Le Col	+ 8"
9	Anna Henderson (GBR)	Team Jumbo–Visma	+ 9"
10	Nathalie Eklund (SWE)	GT Krush Tunap	+ 9"

=== Stage 2 ===
11 March 2021 — Lauwersoog to Lauwersoog, 14.4 km (8.9 mi) (ITT)

Stage 2 Result
Rank	Rider	Team	Time
1	Ellen van Dijk (NED)	Trek–Segafredo	20' 53"
2	Amy Pieters (NED)	SD Worx	+ 26"
3	Lisa Brennauer (GER)	Ceratizit–WNT Pro Cycling	+ 30"
4	Emma Norsgaard Jørgensen (DEN)	Movistar Team	+ 36"
5	Lisa Klein (GER)	Canyon//SRAM	+ 39"
6	Joscelin Lowden (GBR)	Drops–Le Col	+ 43"
7	Alice Barnes (GBR)	Canyon//SRAM	+ 51"
8	Teuntje Beekhuis (NED)	Team Jumbo–Visma	+ 1' 02"
9	Anna Henderson (GBR)	Team Jumbo–Visma	+ 1' 03"
10	Daniek Hengeveld (NED)	GT Krush Tunap	+ 1' 05"

General classification after Stage 2
Rank	Rider	Team	Time
1	Ellen van Dijk (NED)	Trek–Segafredo	3h 34' 56"
2	Amy Pieters (NED)	SD Worx	+ 23"
3	Lisa Brennauer (GER)	Ceratizit–WNT Pro Cycling	+ 25"
4	Emma Norsgaard Jørgensen (DEN)	Movistar Team	+ 33"
5	Lisa Klein (GER)	Canyon//SRAM	+ 39"
6	Joscelin Lowden (GBR)	Drops–Le Col	+ 41"
7	Alice Barnes (GBR)	Canyon//SRAM	+ 45"
8	Teuntje Beekhuis (NED)	Team Jumbo–Visma	+ 1' 02"
9	Anna Henderson (GBR)	Team Jumbo–Visma	+ 1' 02"
10	Daniek Hengeveld (NED)	GT Krush Tunap	+ 1' 05"

=== Stage 3 ===
12 March 2021 — Wijster to Wijster, 115.1 km (71.5 mi)

Stage 3 Result
Rank	Rider	Team	Time
1	Lonneke Uneken (NED)	SD Worx	3h 32' 13"
2	Emma Norsgaard Jørgensen (DEN)	Movistar Team	+ 1' 14"
3	Lisa Brennauer (GER)	Ceratizit–WNT Pro Cycling	+ 1' 14"
4	Ellen van Dijk (NED)	Trek–Segafredo	+ 1' 29"
5	Lisa Klein (GER)	Canyon//SRAM	+ 1' 33"
6	Amy Pieters (NED)	SD Worx	+ 1' 35"
7	Alice Barnes (GBR)	Canyon//SRAM	+ 1' 40"
8	Amber van der Hulst (NED)	Parkhotel Valkenburg	+ 2' 20"
9	Pfeiffer Georgi (GBR)	Team DSM	+ 2' 54"
10	Marta Lach (POL)	Ceratizit–WNT Pro Cycling	+ 2' 58"

General classification after Stage 3
Rank	Rider	Team	Time
1	Ellen van Dijk (NED)	Trek–Segafredo	7h 08' 38"
2	Lisa Brennauer (GER)	Ceratizit–WNT Pro Cycling	+ 6"
3	Emma Norsgaard Jørgensen (DEN)	Movistar Team	+ 12"
4	Lonneke Uneken (NED)	SD Worx	+ 20"
5	Amy Pieters (NED)	SD Worx	+ 29"
6	Lisa Klein (GER)	Canyon//SRAM	+ 43"
7	Alice Barnes (GBR)	Canyon//SRAM	+ 56"
8	Teuntje Beekhuis (NED)	Team Jumbo–Visma	+ 2' 42"
9	Amber van der Hulst (NED)	Parkhotel Valkenburg	+ 2' 42"
10	Anna Henderson (GBR)	Team Jumbo–Visma	+ 2' 50"

== Classification leadership table ==
Stage	Winner	General classification	Points classification	Mountains classification	Sprints classification	Young rider classification	Combativity award	Combined classification	Team classification
1	Jolien d'Hoore	Jolien d'Hoore	Jolien d'Hoore	Chloe Hosking	Gudrun Stock	Emma Norsgaard Jørgensen	Lena Mettraux	Jolien d'Hoore	Team Jumbo–Visma
2	Ellen van Dijk	Ellen van Dijk	Amy Pieters	Chloe Hosking	Gudrun Stock	Emma Norsgaard Jørgensen	not awarded	Amy Pieters	Canyon//SRAM
3	Lonneke Uneken	Ellen van Dijk	Amy Pieters	Lonneke Uneken	Gudrun Stock	Emma Norsgaard Jørgensen	Lonneke Uneken	Ellen van Dijk	SD Worx
Final		Ellen van Dijk	Amy Pieters	Lonneke Uneken	Gudrun Stock	Emma Norsgaard Jørgensen	Not awarded	Ellen van Dijk	SD Worx

== Final classification standings ==
Legend
Denotes the winner of the general classification	Denotes the winner of the young rider classification
Denotes the winner of the points classification	Denotes the winner of the combativity award
Denotes the winner of the mountains classification	Denotes the winner of the combined classification
Denotes the winner of the sprints classification	

=== General classification ===
Final general classification (1–10)
Rank	Rider	Team	Time
1	Ellen van Dijk (NED)	Trek–Segafredo	7h 08' 38"
2	Lisa Brennauer (GER)	Ceratizit–WNT Pro Cycling	+ 6"
3	Emma Norsgaard Jørgensen (DEN)	Movistar Team	+ 12"
4	Lonneke Uneken (NED)	SD Worx	+ 20"
5	Amy Pieters (NED)	SD Worx	+ 29"
6	Lisa Klein (GER)	Canyon//SRAM	+ 43"
7	Alice Barnes (GBR)	Canyon//SRAM	+ 56"
8	Teuntje Beekhuis (NED)	Team Jumbo–Visma	+ 2' 42"
9	Amber van der Hulst (NED)	Parkhotel Valkenburg	+ 2' 42"
10	Anna Henderson (GBR)	Team Jumbo–Visma	+ 2' 50"

=== Points classification ===
Final points classification (1–10)
Rank	Rider	Team	Points
1	Amy Pieters (NED)	SD Worx	40
2	Ellen van Dijk (NED)	Trek–Segafredo	39
3	Emma Norsgaard Jørgensen (DEN)	Movistar Team	39
4	Alice Barnes (GBR)	Canyon//SRAM	38
5	Lisa Brennauer (GER)	Ceratizit–WNT Pro Cycling	32
6	Lonneke Uneken (NED)	SD Worx	25
7	Jolien D'Hoore (BEL)	SD Worx	25
8	Lisa Klein (GER)	Canyon//SRAM	24
9	Anna Henderson (GBR)	Team Jumbo–Visma	21
10	Karlijn Swinkels (NED)	Team Jumbo–Visma	16

=== Mountains classification ===
Final mountains classification (1–10)
Rank	Rider	Team	Points
1	Lonneke Uneken (NED)	SD Worx	25
2	Emma Norsgaard Jørgensen (DEN)	Movistar Team	9
3	Jolien D'Hoore (BEL)	SD Worx	5
4	Ellen van Dijk (NED)	Trek–Segafredo	3
5	Lisa Klein (GER)	Canyon//SRAM	3
6	Anna Henderson (GBR)	Team Jumbo–Visma	3
7	Alexis Ryan (USA)	Canyon//SRAM	3
8	Lisa Brennauer (GER)	Ceratizit–WNT Pro Cycling	1
9	Alicia González Blanco (ESP)	Movistar Team	1
10	Susanne Andersen (NOR)	Team DSM	1

=== Sprints classification ===
Final sprints classification (1–10)
Rank	Rider	Team	Points
1	Gudrun Stock (GER)	Germany	17
2	Lonneke Uneken (NED)	SD Worx	6
3	Lisa Klein (GER)	Canyon//SRAM	6
4	Lauretta Hanson (AUS)	Trek–Segafredo	4
5	Anna Henderson (GBR)	Team Jumbo–Visma	3
6	Emma Norsgaard Jørgensen (DEN)	Movistar Team	3
7	Jolien D'Hoore (BEL)	SD Worx	3
8	Karlijn Swinkels (NED)	Team Jumbo–Visma	2
9	Elise Chabbey (SUI)	Canyon//SRAM	1
10	Romy Kasper (GER)	Team Jumbo–Visma	1

=== Young rider classification ===
Final young rider classification (1–8)
Rank	Rider	Team	Time
1	Emma Norsgaard Jørgensen (DEN)	Movistar Team	7h 08' 50"
2	Lonneke Uneken (NED)	SD Worx	+ 8"
3	Amber van der Hulst (NED)	Parkhotel Valkenburg	+ 2' 30"
4	Pfeiffer Georgi (GBR)	Team DSM	+ 4' 03"
5	Maike van der Duin (NED)	Drops–Le Col	+ 4' 11"
6	Mischa Bredewold (NED)	Parkhotel Valkenburg	+ 7' 28"
7	Sofie van Rooijen (NED)	Netherlands	+ 8' 32"
8	Jade Wiel (FRA)	FDJ Nouvelle-Aquitaine Futuroscope	+ 8' 56"

=== Combined classification ===
Final combined classification (1–10)
Rank	Rider	Team	Points
1	Ellen van Dijk (NED)	Trek–Segafredo	27
2	Amy Pieters (NED)	SD Worx	21
3	Emma Norsgaard Jørgensen (DEN)	Movistar Team	20
4	Lisa Brennauer (GER)	Ceratizit–WNT Pro Cycling	18
5	Lonneke Uneken (NED)	SD Worx	13
6	Alice Barnes (GBR)	Canyon//SRAM	12
7	Lisa Klein (GER)	Canyon//SRAM	8
8	Jolien D'Hoore (BEL)	SD Worx	4
9	Teuntje Beekhuis (NED)	Team Jumbo–Visma	3
10	Anna Henderson (GBR)	Team Jumbo–Visma	3

=== Team classification ===
Final team classification (1–6)
Rank	Team	Time
1	SD Worx	21h 29' 45"
2	Canyon//SRAM	+ 46"
3	Team Jumbo–Visma	+ 4' 49"
4	Ceratizit–WNT Pro Cycling	+ 5' 25"
5	Parkhotel Valkenburg	+ 14' 07"
6	FDJ Nouvelle-Aquitaine Futuroscope	+ 16' 45"

== See also ==
- 2021 in women's road cycling
