= Zoutkamp =

- Village
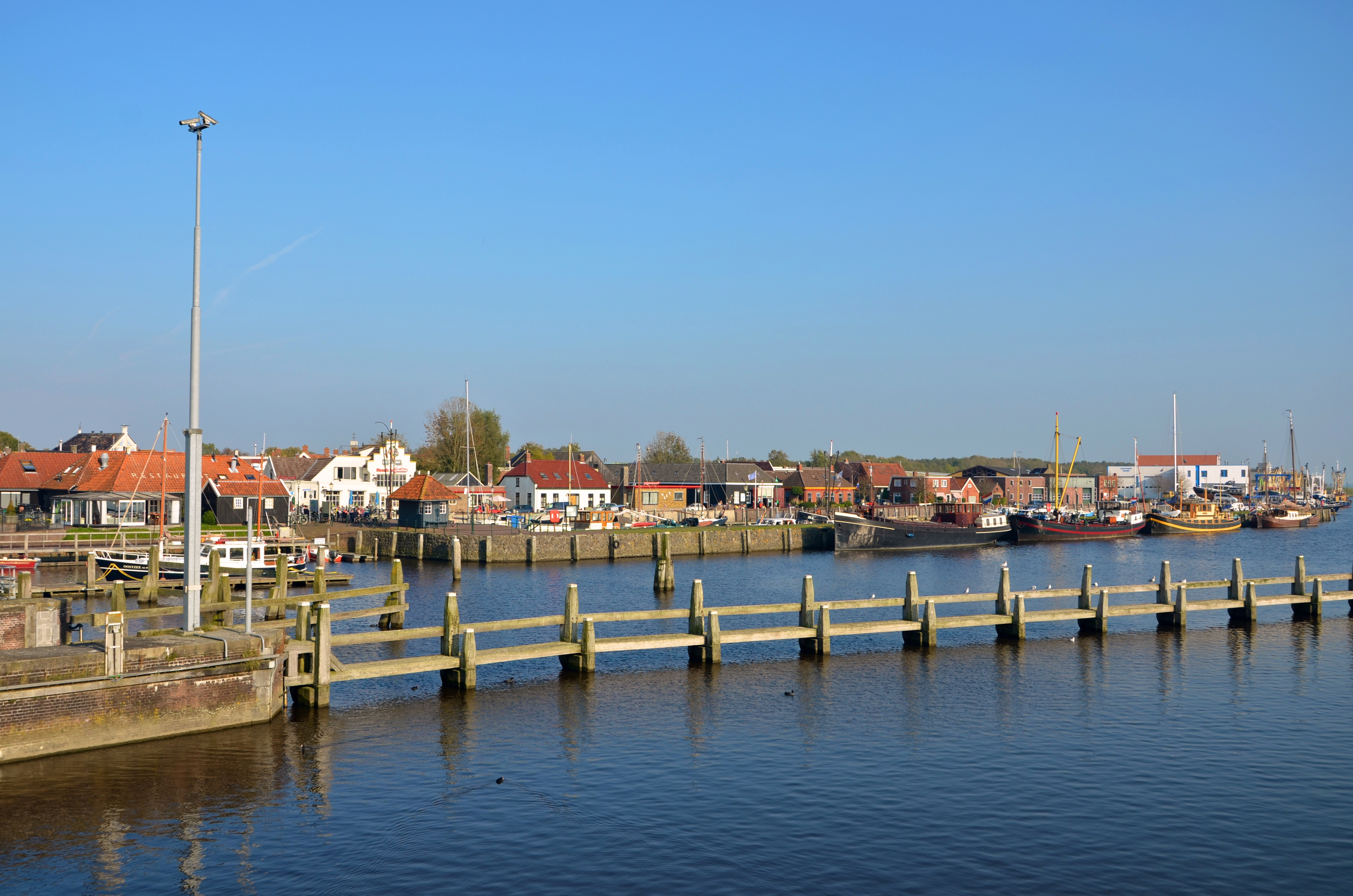
- Zoutkamp in 2011

- Location of Zoutkamp in the province of Groningen Zoutkamp (Netherlands)
- Coordinates: 53°20′15″N 6°18′11″E
- Country: Netherlands
- Province: Groningen
- Municipality: Het Hogeland

Area
  - Total: 1.23 km^{2} (0.47 sq mi)
- Elevation: 1 m (3.3 ft)

Population (2021)
  - Total: 1,195
  - Density: 972/km^{2} (2,520/sq mi)
- Time zone: UTC+1 (CET)
  - Summer (DST): UTC+2 (CEST)
- Postal code: 9974
- Dialing code: 0595
- Website: zoutkamp.net

Zoutkamp (Dutch pronunciation: [ˈzʌutkɑmp]; Gronings: Zoltkamp [ˈzɔːɫtkɑmp]) is a village in the municipality Het Hogeland which is part of the province Groningen in the Netherlands. The village started as a sconce. During the Dutch Revolt, it was the site of the Battle of Zoutkamp. Later it became a fishing village. The harbour was moved to Lauwersoog in 1969 as a result of the closure of the Lauwersmeer, and is nowadays used for recreational purposes. The economy of the village mainly depends on fishing.

== History ==
Zoutkamp was first mentioned in documents in 1418 as Soltcampum. Its first inhabitants might have been soldiers. Its name refers to salt and field, which probably means that it was a place for salt production.

During the Dutch Revolt, the city of Groningen sided with Spain. Most of the Ommelanden (country side) and the province of Friesland opted for the Dutch Republic. In 1576, a sconce was built at Zoutkamp by the Spanish. In 1589, the sconce was conquered in the Battle of Zoutkamp by the Dutch Republic under the command of William Louis of Nassau. On 22 July 1594, after the Siege of Groningen, Groningen was forced to side with Dutch Republic.

During the 17th and 18th century, fishers settled in Zoutkamp. By 1756, Zoutkamp consisted of 25 houses. In 1828, a harbour was constructed, and the church was built in 1836. In 1840, the population had increased to 720 people. In 1882, the fortification was demolished and the military function of Zoutkamp ceased. During World War II, between 80 and 100 soldiers of the Kriegsmarine were stationed near Zoutkamp, however the village saw little action.

== Lauwersmeer ==
In the 1950s, there were calls to close the Lauwerszee, the bay near which Zoutkamp was located. As part of the Zuiderzee Works, it was decided to build a dike between Friesland and Groningen, and turn the bay into Lauwersmeer. In 1969, the dike was completed, and a harbour was constructed at Lauwersoog. The province of Groningen intended to use the harbour for recreational purposes only, because they were constructing the Eemshaven, as a new main harbour. Zoutkamp and the province of Friesland desired a commercial harbour. In January 1970, the conflict was brought to the States General of the Netherlands.

Lauwersoog became a successful fishing harbour, however the fishers of Zoutkamp still use the registration "ZK" instead of "LO" to indicate their place of origin. The harbour of Zoutkamp is nowadays for recreational boats only. The ferry to Schiermonnikoog which used to depart from Zoutkamp and Oostmahorn was moved to Lauwersoog.

== Recent history ==
Until 2008, Zoutkamp was the site of a ground station of the Dutch Nationale SIGINT Organisatie (National Signals Intelligence Service), which intercepted satellite communications much like the U.S. National Security Agency.

The economy of Zoutkamp is still based on fishing and the village is not subject to a move to the city. As a result, it still has a lively centre with much retail. In 2019, it became part of the municipality of Het Hogeland.

== Gallery ==
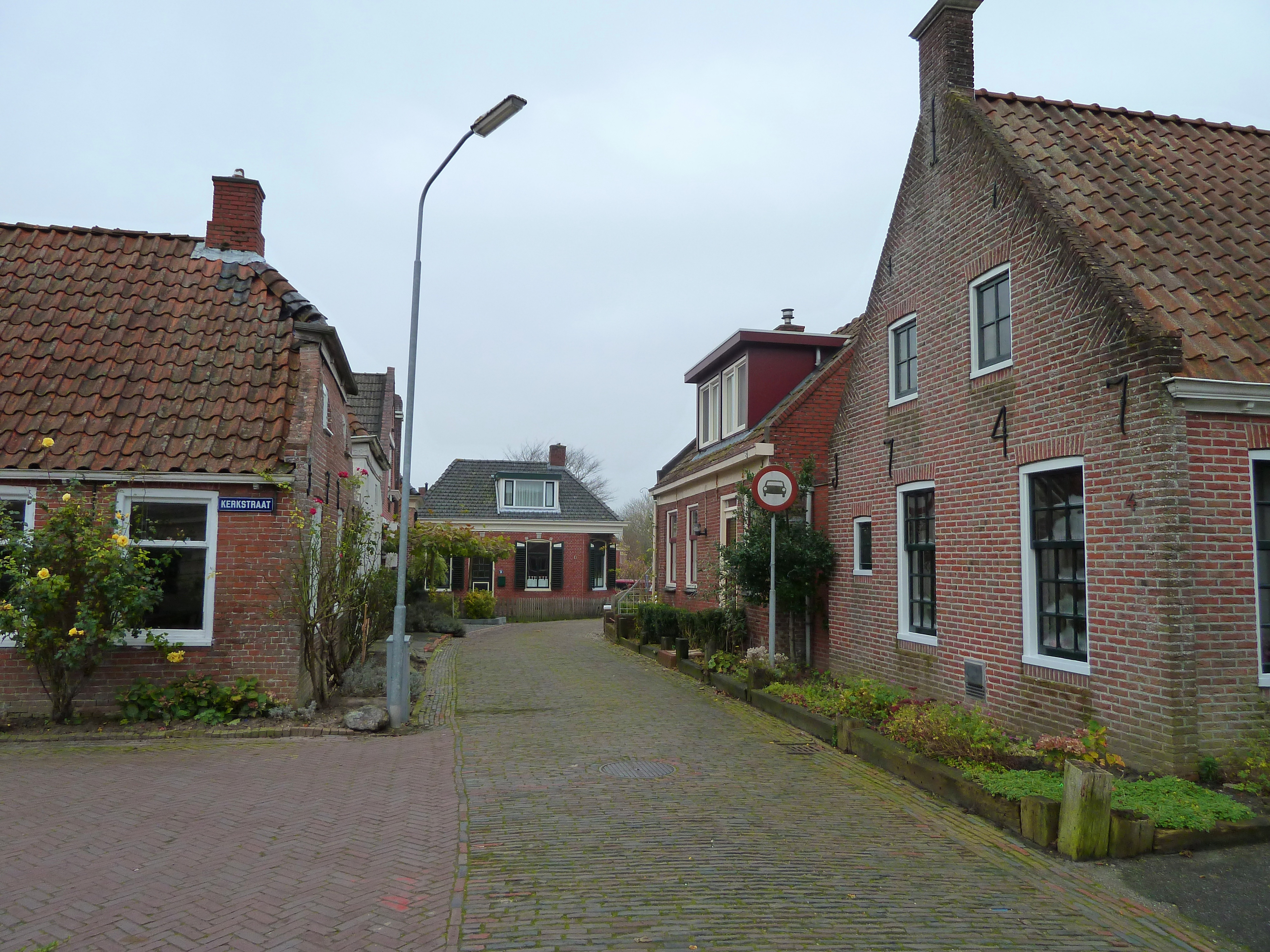
Old fishing houses

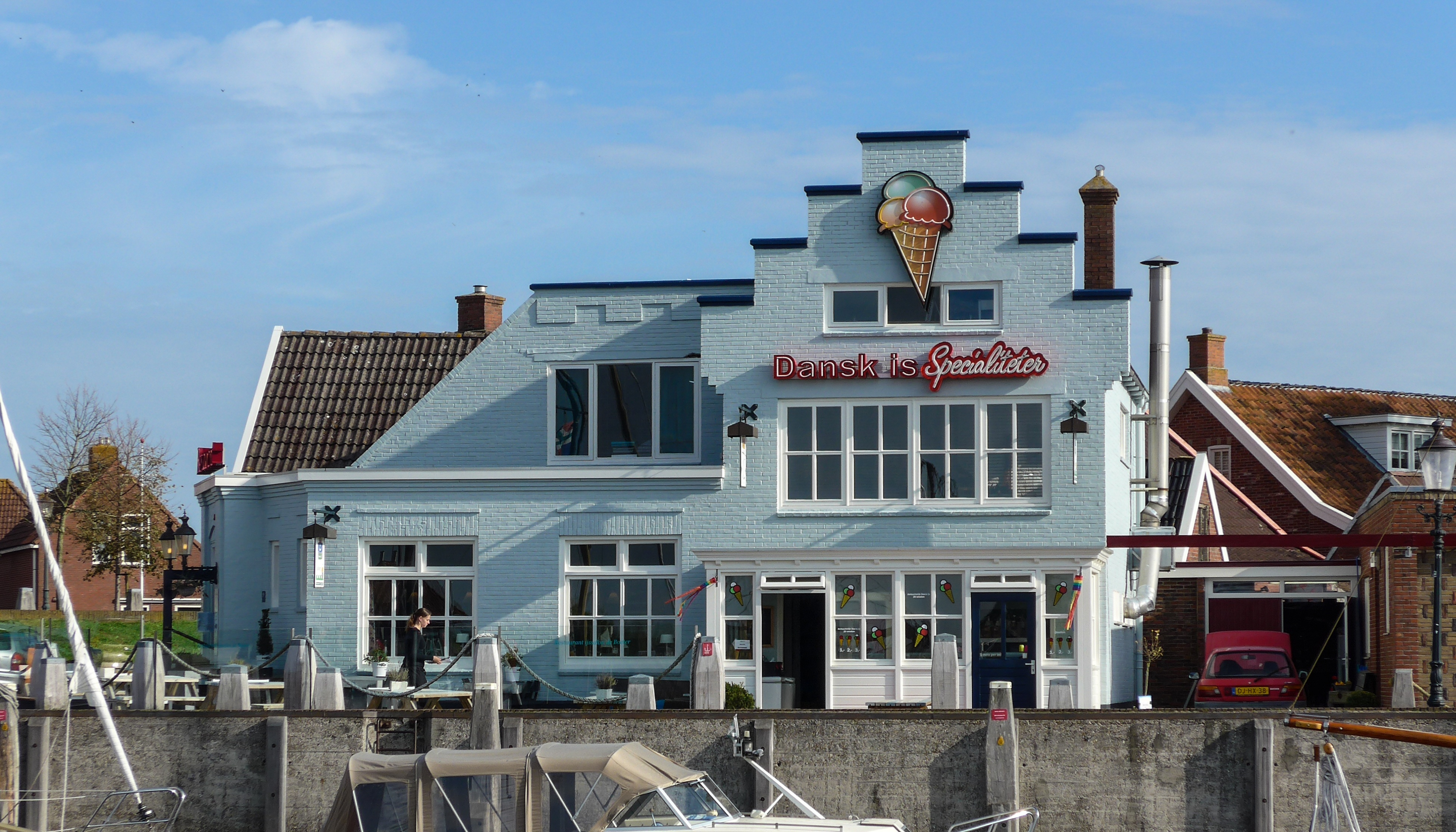
Ice cream parlor

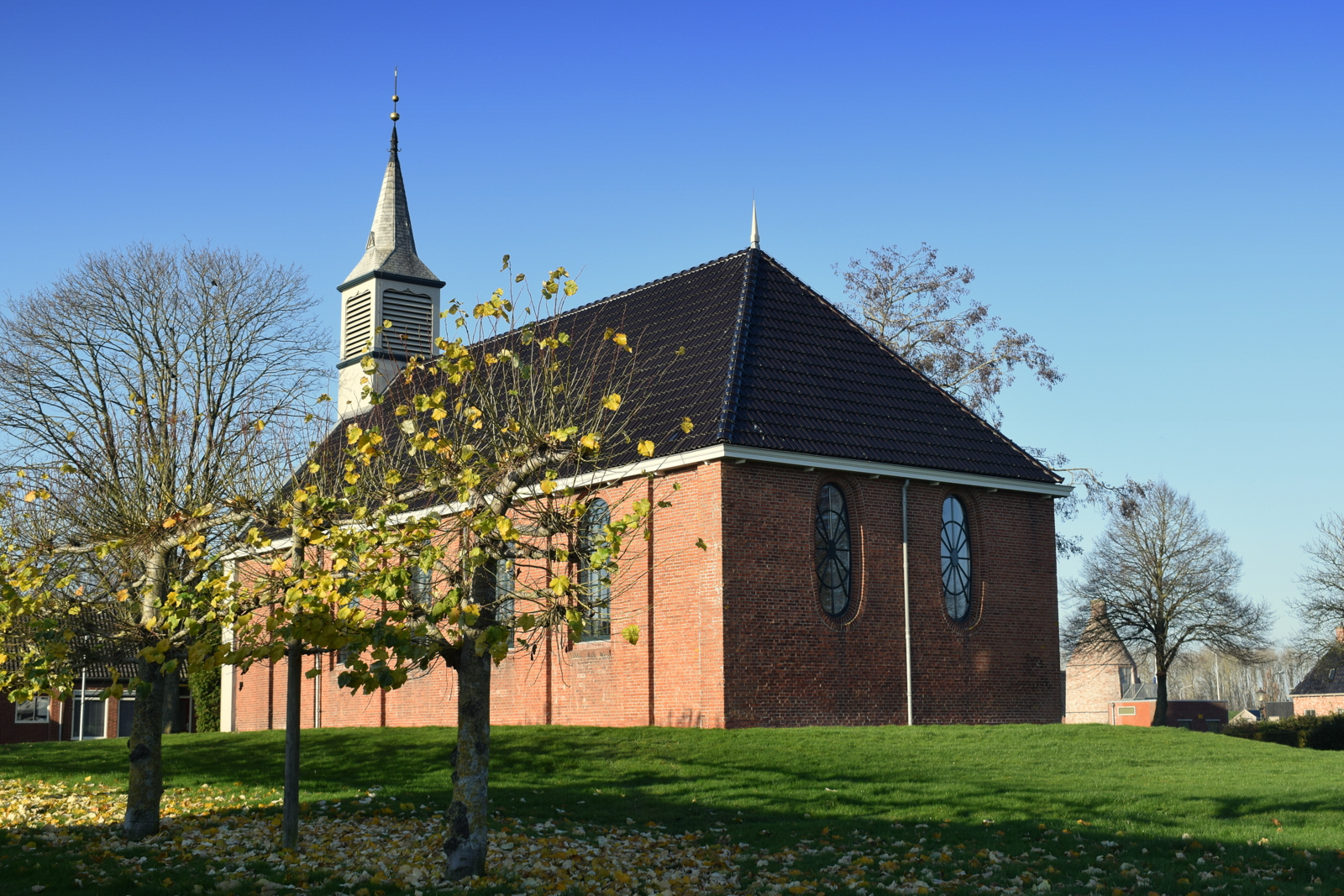
The old church

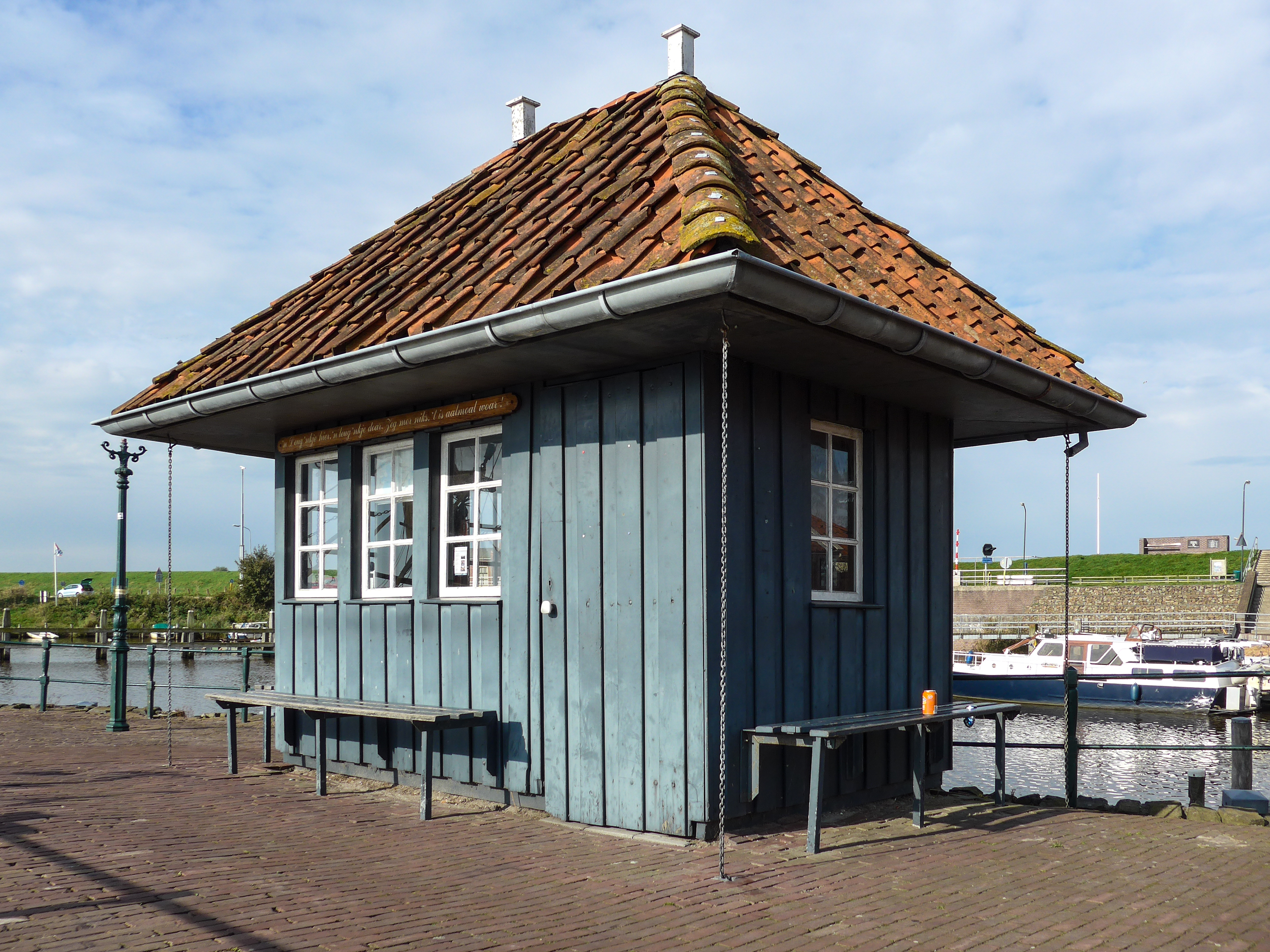
The liars' bench. The sign reads "A lie here, a lie there. Don't say anything; it's all true."

== See also ==
- ZK 14 – Sailing ship from Zoutkamp, bought by German bard and writer Martin Luserke in 1934
- Hunze
