= Zuider Ee =

River in Frisia

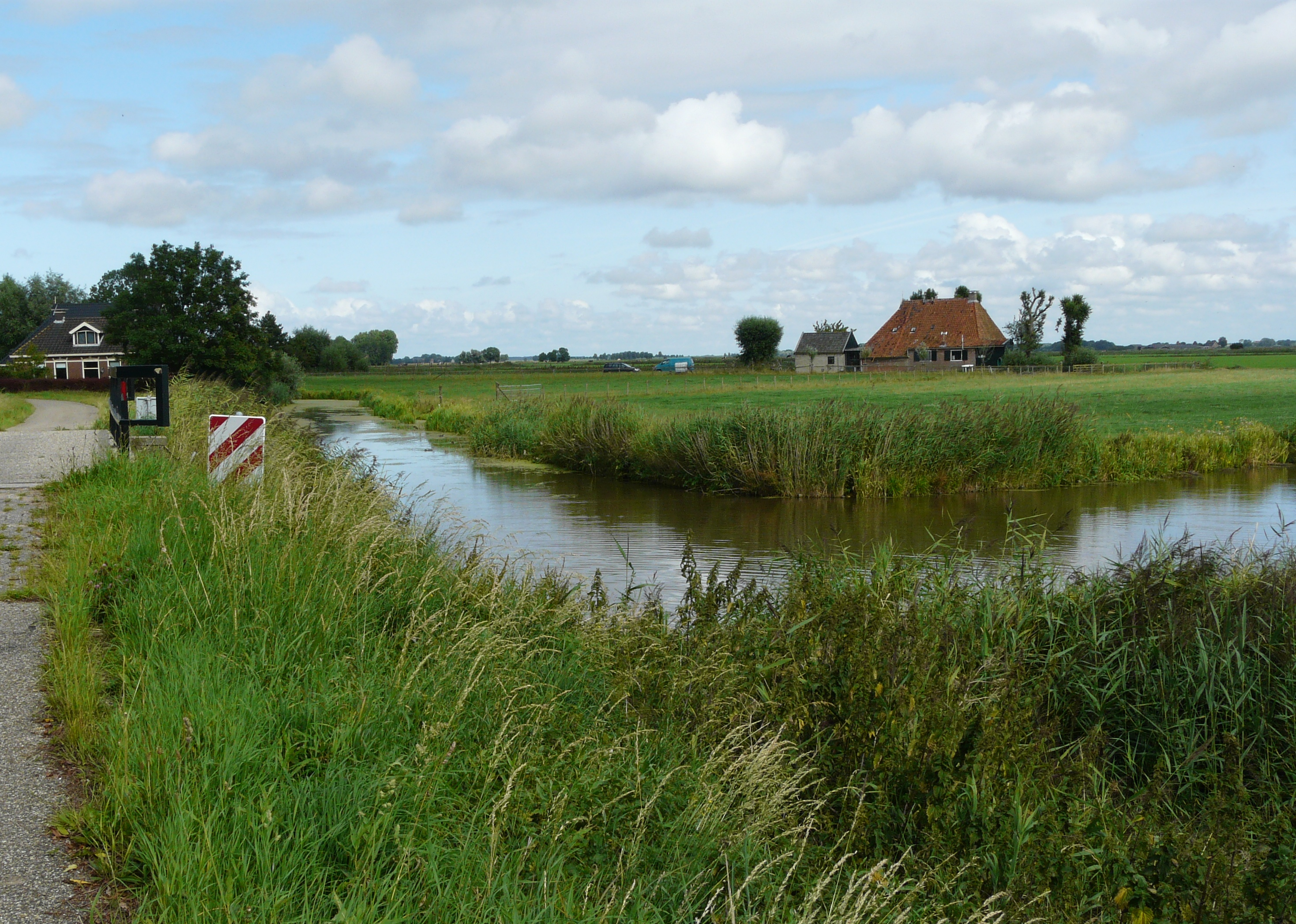
- The connection of the Morrastervaart (left) to the Zuider Ee near the hamlet of Reidswal

Location
- Country: Frisia

Physical characteristics
- Source: Dokkum
- Mouth: Lauwersmeer
  - coordinates: 53°21′53″N 6°09′50″E

The Zuider Ee (officially West Frisian: Suderie, also called Suder Ie or Súd Ie) is a small river in the Dutch province of Friesland that flows from Dokkum to Ezumazijl.

== History ==
The Zuider Ee is mentioned by Nicolaes van Geelkercken on his 1616 map of Dokkum as De Suir Ee. On the 1664 map of Oostdongeradeel in the Schotanus Atlas, it is referred to as Suyder Ee, and then on the 1718 map as De Zuyder Ee vulgo de Suyr Ee (where vulgo means 'in the vernacular'). On his 1855 map, Wopke Eekhoff mentions the water as the Zuider Ee. The name Zuider Ee is well explained based on the orientation of the map image, where the Dokkumer Ee between Leeuwarden and Dokkum is considered the northern Ee, while the part between Dokkum and Ezumazijl is considered the southern Ee. This orientation of the map image was quite rare in the northern Netherlands. A similar relationship would have existed between the Zuider Ee and the Paesens, which would therefore have been called Noorder Ee.

During excavations within the city of Dokkum in 1954, a salt marsh area was discovered, presumably attributed to the predecessors of the Paesens and the Zuider Ee. Originally, the Zuider Ee consisted of two separate streams that were connected to each other by digging through the Metslawier-Jouswier-Ee salt marsh. As a result, the Zuider Ee also has a kink between Metslawier and Jouswier. According to old maps, the Zuider Ee originally began at the village of Ee. Despite the construction of shipping locks in Dokkum and Ezumazijl, the Zuider Ee was never heavily trafficked due to the proximity of the Dokkumergrootdiep.

The Zuider Ee historically played a significant role in draining a large part of Oostdongeradeel. Through the Oostrumerzijl to the west of the village of Eastrum, water was discharged into the Dokkumergrootdiep. In the past, substantial portions of Westdongeradeel and Oostdongeradeel used to drain their water via the Paesens until it silted up around 1450. Subsequently, drainage largely took place through the Dokkumergrootdiep, but due to the open connection with the city canals of Dokkum and the Zuider Ee, Oostdongeradeel experienced frequent flooding.

The drainage of the entire Eastergao region, in fact, occurred through Oostdongeradeel. The Paesens was dammed around 1600 near Dokkum, causing the area to contend with even more water. Then, in 1604, the Oostrumerzijl was also closed, diverting all water discharge through the Zuider Ee and Ezumazijl. However, this system wasn't adequately equipped to handle the volume, resulting in the need to renovate the Oostrumerzijl.

In 1633, Oostdongeradeel was allowed to construct a sluice at Dokkum to turn back the water, but the problem persisted. By 1672 the Oostrumerzijl had silted up and was permanently closed. With the construction of the Dokkumer Nieuwe Zijlen lock in 1729, the sluice in Dokkum was dropped and the water was once again given free rein. To alleviate this, the Jaarlasloot near Wetsens was deepened to discharge the water through part of the Paesens. Only in 1821 would the impounding bosom water be kept out of the rest of Friesland by the construction of a dike between Holwert and Dokkum.

In 1931, the Dongerdielen pumping station was established at Ezumazijl. This pumping station manages the level of the Zuider Ee and most of East and Westdongeradeel. The flume of this pumping station discharges into the lock bowl of the Ezumazijl sluice. In the 1970s, the Lauwersmeer across the Zuider Ee was constructed. In this process, the water was partially channelized, although the old course remains recognizable through cut-off meanders that are still present.

== Course ==
The Zuider Ee originates at the eastern city canal of Dokkum. Not far from the city center, there is a lock in the so-called Schapedijkje, known as the Oostervallaat. From there, the Zuider Ee flows in a northeasterly direction through the It Fûgellân district of Dokkum. Just outside the town, the Zuider Ee crosses the N361 road and then runs more or less parallel to this road until it branches off at Jouswier, heading in an easterly direction. At this point, the waterway crosses the N358 road. Between Eanjum and Ee, the water flows through the area known as the Anjumer Kolken. At Ezumazijl, the Zuider Ee connects to the Lauwersmeer via the Ezumazijl Lock. Beyond the former sea dike, it continues as the Raskes channel and then as the Bochtje.

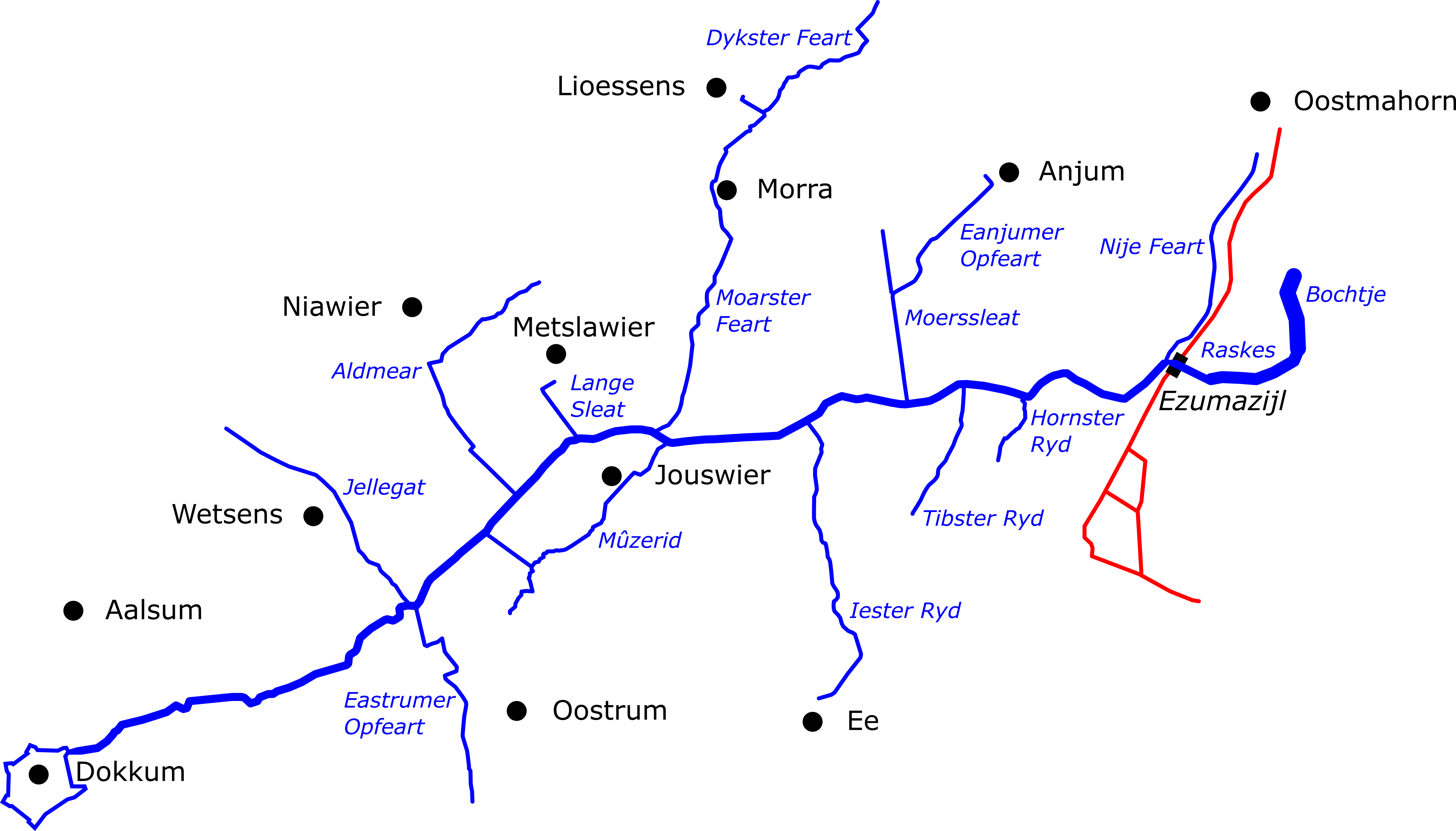
Course of the Zuider Ee

Across the Zuider Ee are the following bridges:

- Oosterverlaat in Dokkum
- Dongeradyksbrêge in Dokkum
- Reigersbridge in Dokkum
- Ryslânsbrêge in Dokkum
- A pedestrian bridge in Dokkum
- Fûgellânsbrêge east of Dokkum
- Loulânsbrêge east of Dokkum
- Kowebrêge (actually two bridges), between Jouswier and Reidswal
- Grutte Tille, between Jouswier and Reidswal
- Witte Brêge, between Ee and Anjum
- A pedestrian bridge at a pumping station, between Ee and Anjum
- Saatsenbrêge between Dijkshorne and Anjum
- Bridge at Ezumazijl

Several canals connect to the Zuider Ee, these are the: Oostrumeropvaart, Morrastervaart, Eesteropvaart, Lange Sloot, and the Anjumeropvaart (via the Moersloot).

== Súd Ie and Wetterfront Dokkum ==
In 2013, the Súd Ie & Wetterfront Dokkum project was launched. To connect Dokkum with the Lauwersmeer, the Zuider Ee will be made navigable for medium-sized motorboats. This project includes raising the bridges over the Zuider Ee and the construction of fishing sites and trailer ramps. In addition, the Zuider Ee will be dredged and the old towpath restored. It is planned to extend the navigation route to Oostmahorn via the New Canal (Dutch: Nieuwe Vaart). Work will also be carried out at the Oosterverlaat in Dokkum.

== Gallery ==
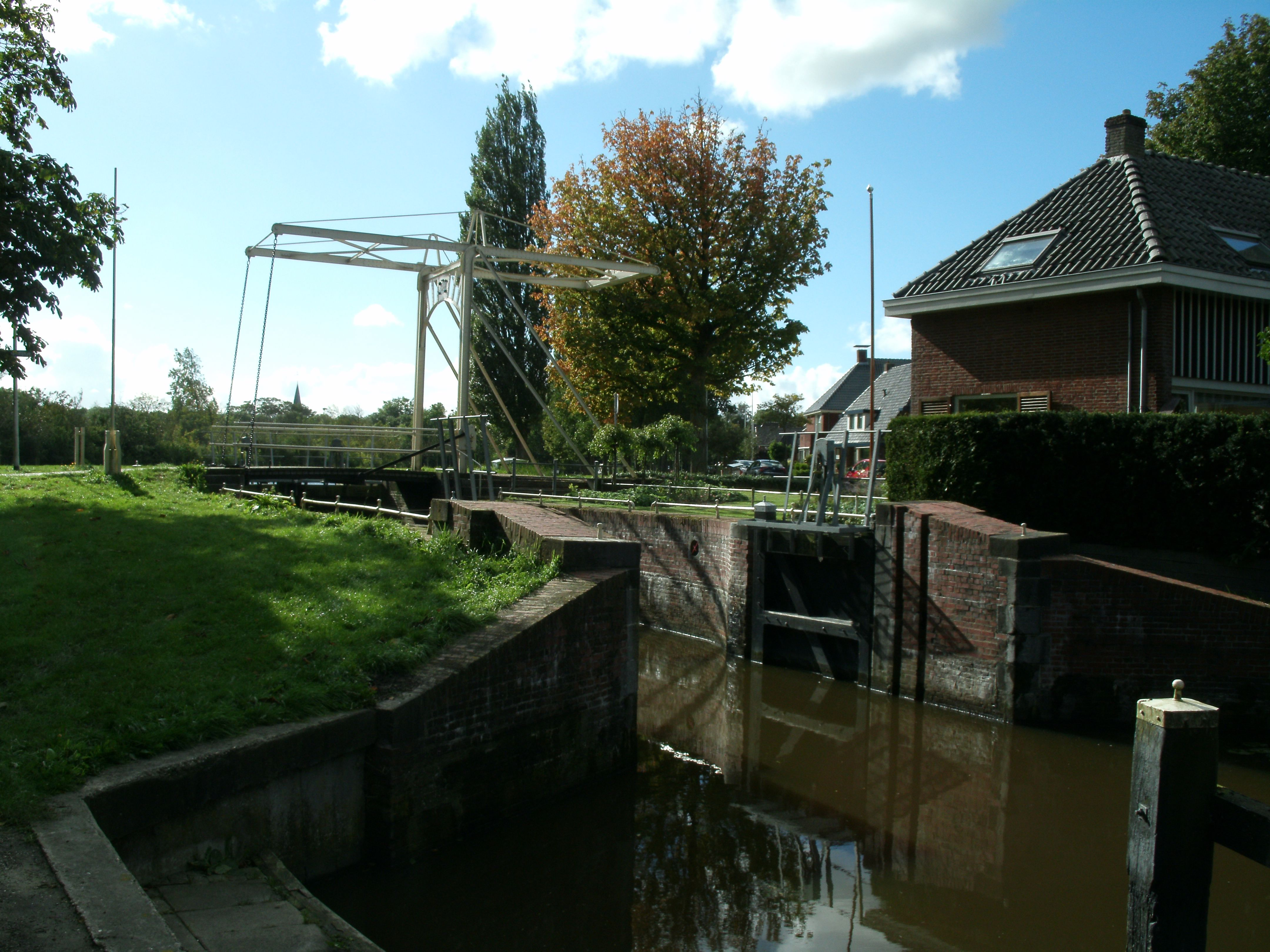
The Oosterverlaat at Dokkum

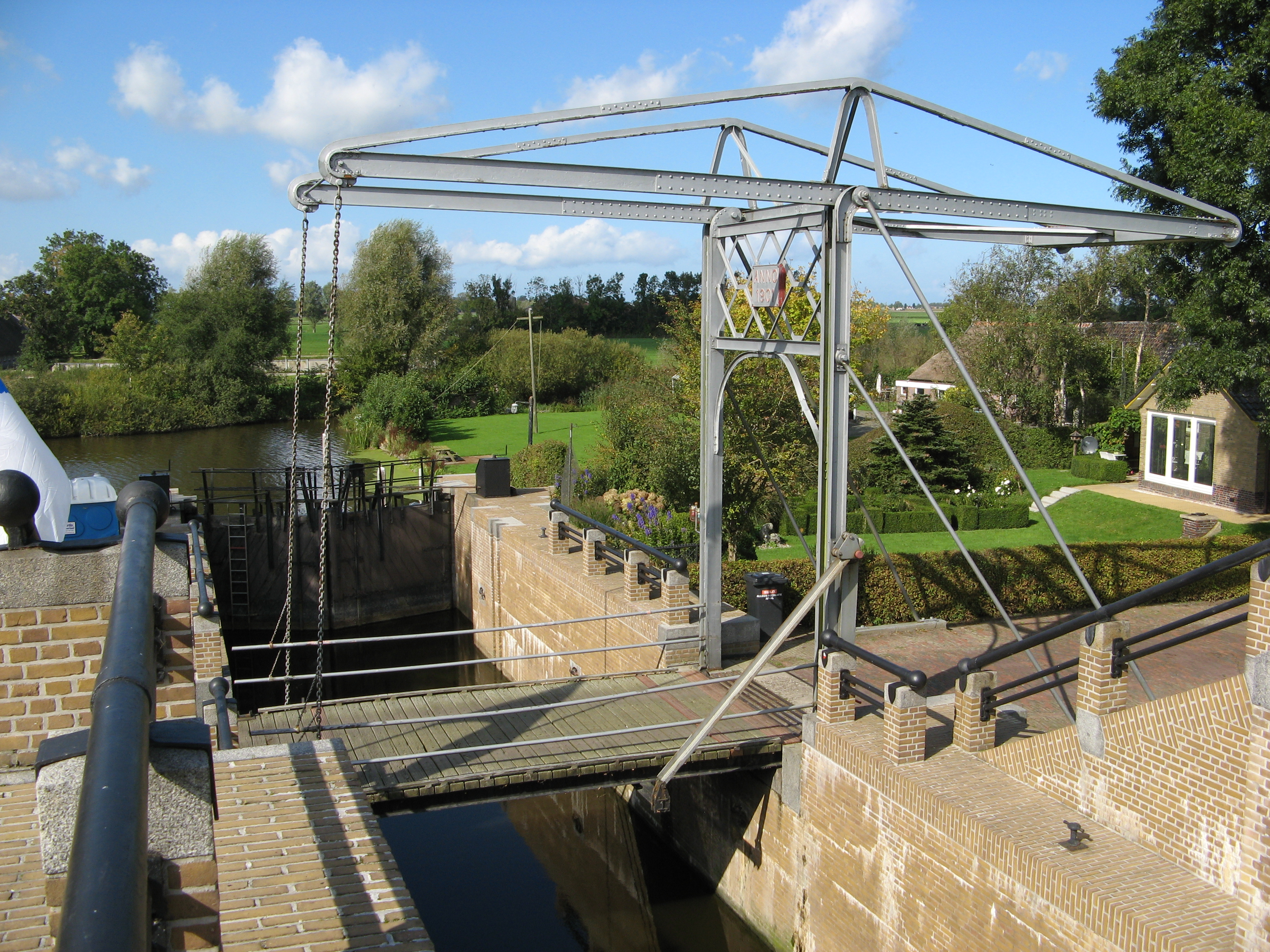
Lock and bridge at Ezumazijl

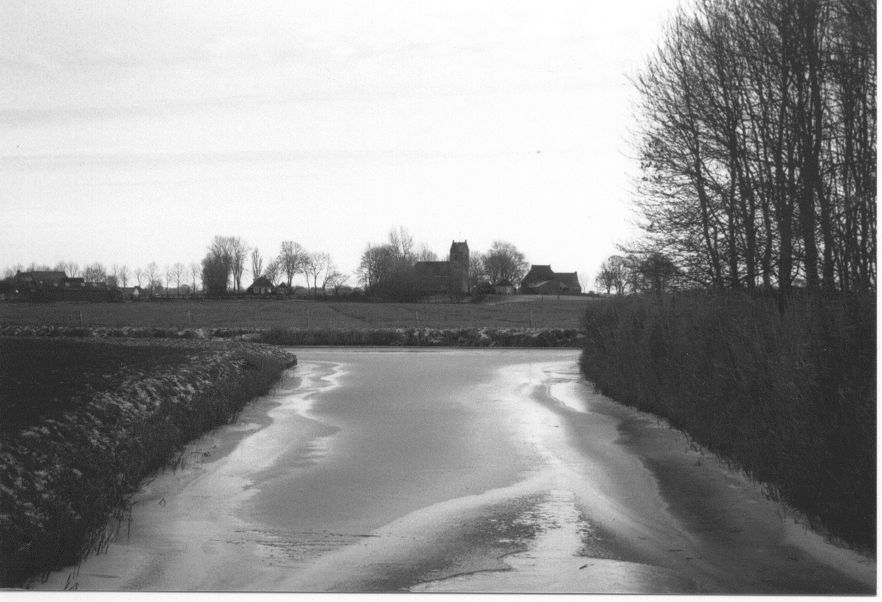
Connection of the Lange Sloot to the Zuider Ee with the Petruskerk of Jouswier in the background

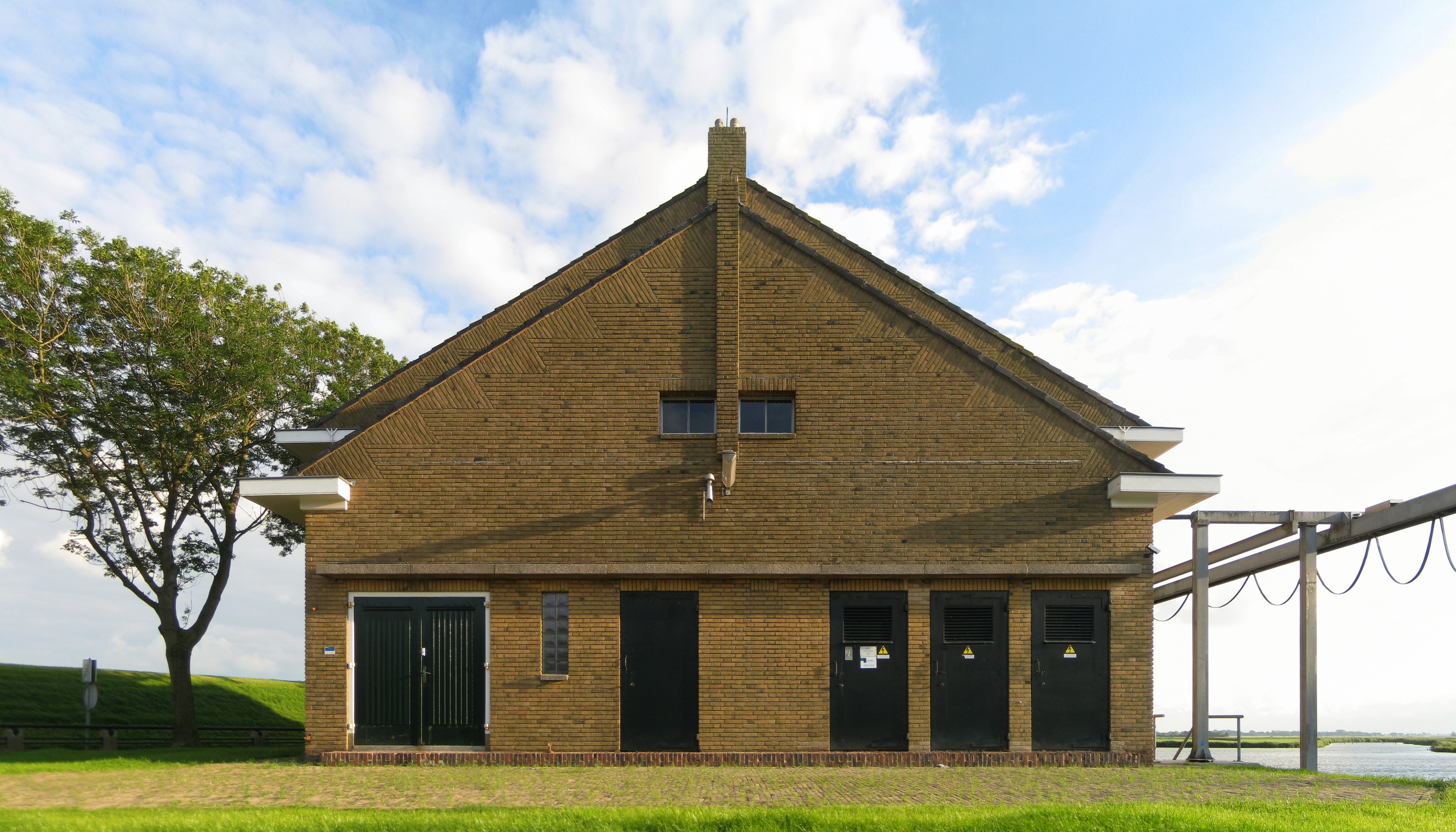
The Dongerdielen Pumping Station from 1931.

== See also ==
- Frisia
- Dokkum
- Lauwersmeer
