= Cycling at the 2019 European Games – Women's madison =

Women's madison at the 2019 European Games
- Venue: Minsk Velodrome
- Date: 30 June
- Competitors: 24 from 12 nations
- Winning points: 44

Medalists
gold medal	Jessica Roberts; Megan Barker	Great Britain
silver medal	Kirsten Wild; Amber van der Hulst	Netherlands
bronze medal	Diana Klimova; Maria Novolodskaya	Russia

The women's madison competition at the 2019 European Games was held at the Minsk Velodrome on 30 June 2019.

== Results ==
120 laps (30 km) were raced with 12 sprints.

Rank	Name	Nation	Sprint												Laps		Total	Finish order
Rank	Name	Nation	1	2	3	4	5	6	7	8	9	10	11	12	+	−	Total	Finish order
1st place, gold medalist(s)	Jessica Roberts; Megan Barker	Great Britain			5	5		1	5			3	5		20		44	6
2nd place, silver medalist(s)	Kirsten Wild; Amber van der Hulst	Netherlands	5	2	2	3		5	3	5	2	2	1	10			40	1
3rd place, bronze medalist(s)	Diana Klimova; Maria Novolodskaya	Russia	1	3			3	2			3	5		2	20		39	4
4	Elisa Balsamo; Letizia Paternoster	Italy	2	5	1	2	1	3	1	1	5	1	3	6			31	2
5	Lydia Boylan; Lydia Gurley	Ireland				1	2						2	4			9	3
6	Polina Pivovarova; Hanna Tserakh	Belarus					5										5	5
7	Oksana Kliachina; Anna Nahirna	Ukraine								2	1						3	8
8	Léna Mettraux; Andrea Waldis	Switzerland	3		3											20	–14	7
9	Alžbeta Bačíková; Tereza Medveďová	Slovakia														20	–20	9
10	Lucie Hochmann; Kateřina Kohoutková	Czech Republic		1					2	3						40	–34	11
11	Karolina Karasiewicz; Nikol Płosaj	Poland														40	–40	10
	Olivija Baleišytė; Viktorija Šumskytė	Lithuania														60		DNF
