= Lauwers =

River between Friesland and Groningen, the Netherlands

Coordinates: 53°15′24″N 6°14′0″E

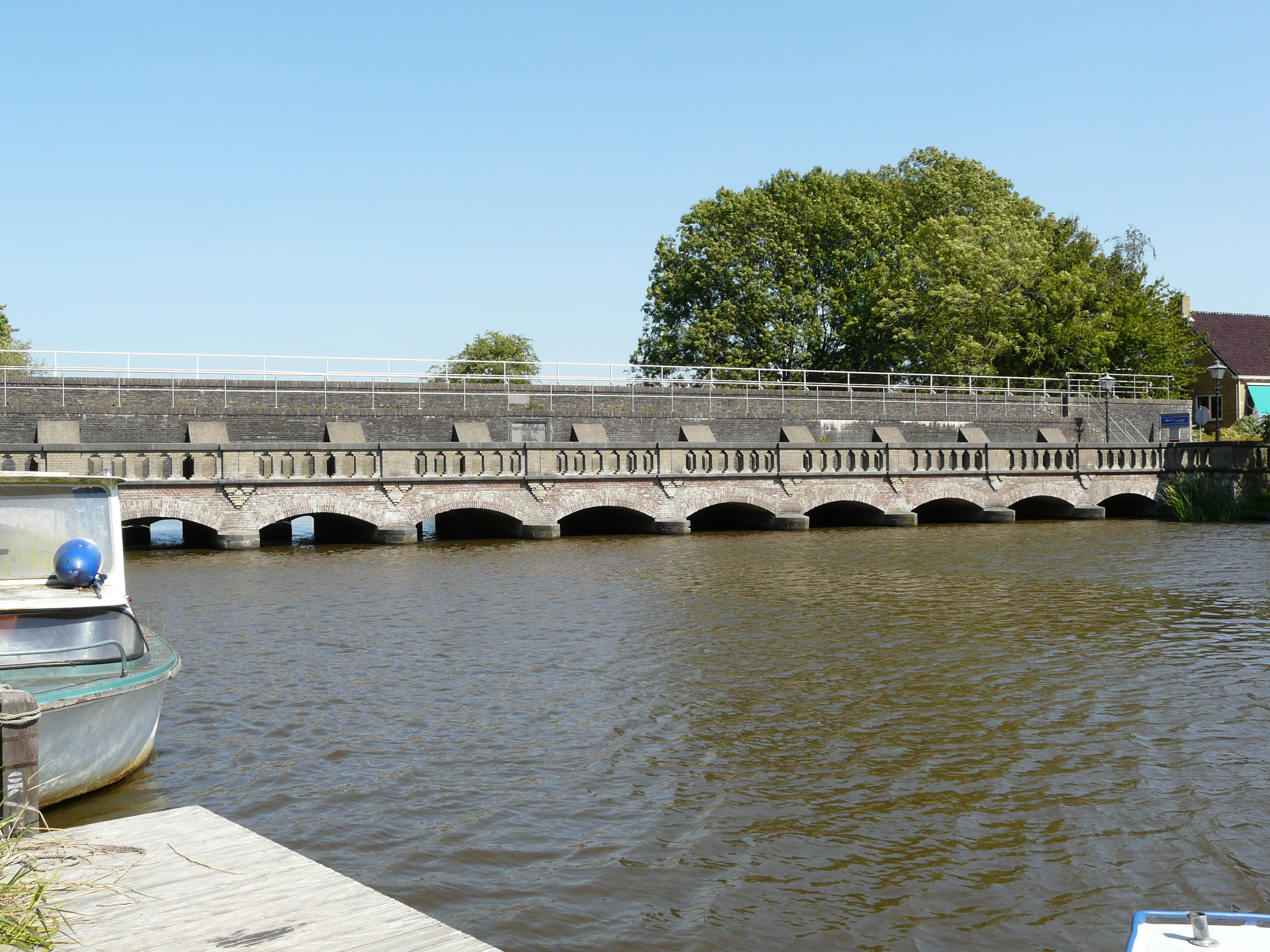
- Munnekezijl lock in the Lauwers

Location
- Country: Netherlands
- Provinces: Friesland, Groningen

Physical characteristics
- Source
  - location: south of Surhuisterveen, Friesland
- Mouth
  - location: west of Zoutkamp, Groningen
- Length: 25 kilometres (16 mi)

The Lauwers (Dutch pronunciation: [ˈlʌu.ərs]) is a river in the Netherlands. It forms part of the border between the provinces of Friesland and Groningen. From the 730s to Widukind's defeat in 785, it was part of the border of the Frankish Empire.

The former Lauwerszee and the present-day Lauwersmeer are both named after the river, which as a small stream has its source southeast of the village of Surhuisterveen. Near Gerkesklooster/Stroobos, it crosses the Prinsesmargrietkanaal/Van Starkenborgh Canal.

The Lauwers achieves the width of a true river at the place that it gains its tributary, the Oude Vaart, near the Schalkendam. Further along its course, the Lauwers splits into two branches, the Frisian Oude Lauwers and the Zijldiep, in Groningen province.

The Lauwers meets the sea at the Wadden Sea, emptying into a channel between the islands of Schiermonnikoog and Rottumerplaat/Rottumeroog, which can be viewed as the continuation of the river.

== See also ==
- Hunze
