= Amber van der Hulst =

Dutch cyclist (born 1999)

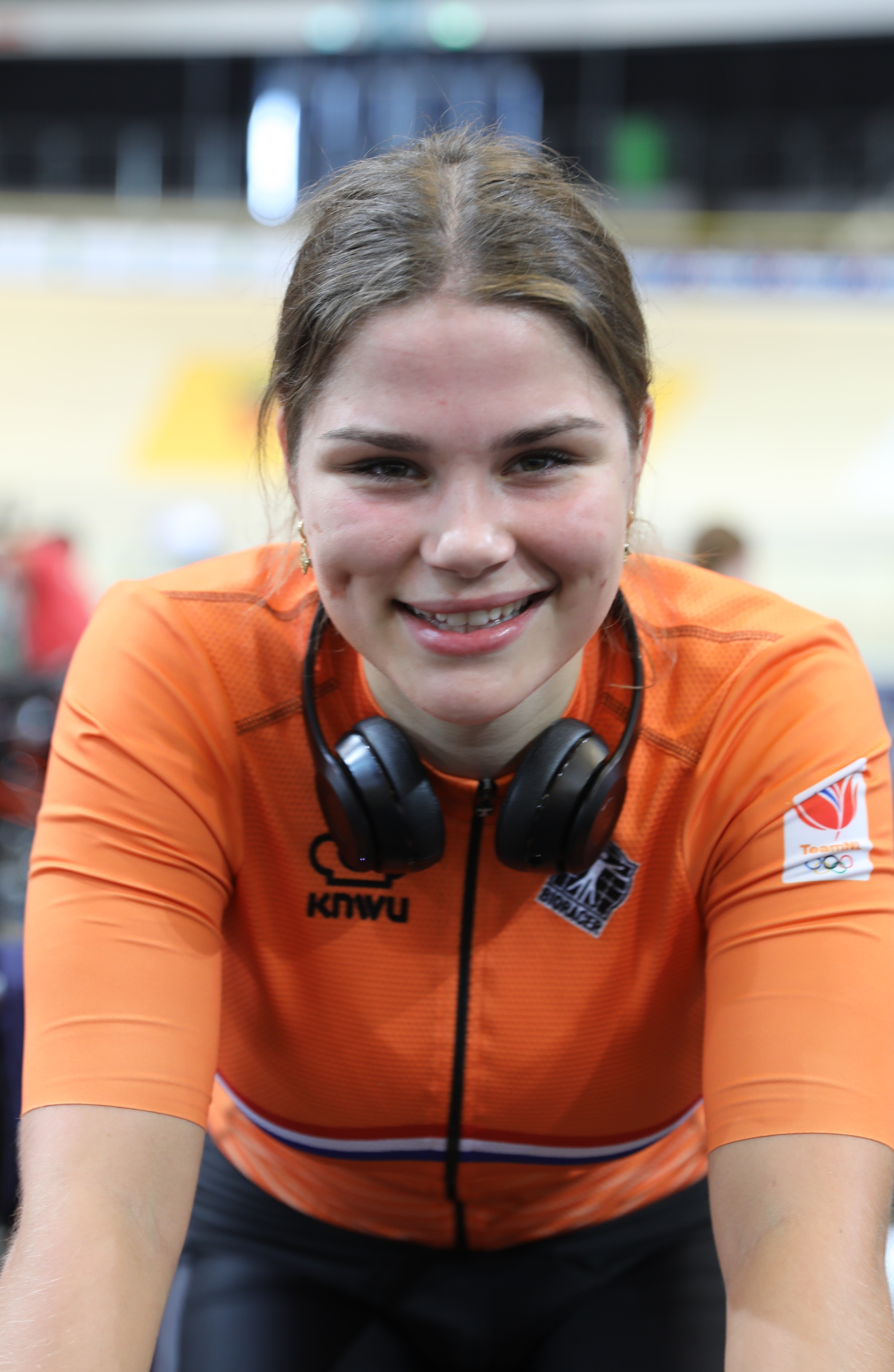
- Van der Hulst in 2019

Personal information
- Full name: Amber van der Hulst
- Born: 21 September 1999 (age 27)

Cycling career
- Sport: Cycling
- Current team: VolkerWessels Cycling Team
- Disciplines: Road; Track
- Role: Rider

Professional teams
- 2020–2021: Parkhotel Valkenburg
- 2022–2023: Liv Racing TeqFind
- 2024: Liv AlUla Jayco Women's Continental Team
- 2025: Liv AlUla Jayco
- 2026-2027: VolkerWessels Cycling Team
Medal record
Women's track cycling
Representing Netherlands
European Games
| Silver medal – second place | 2019 Minsk | Madison |

Amber van der Hulst (born 21 September 1999) is a Dutch professional racing cyclist, who currently rides for UCI Women's WorldTeam VolkerWessels Cycling Team. In June 2019, at the European Games in Minsk, she won a silver medal in the madison event.

== Major results ==
2016
9th Gent–Wevelgem Juniors
2017
1st Overall EPZ Omloop van Borsele

1st Stage 2

2nd Gent–Wevelgem Juniors
2nd Healthy Ageing Tour Juniors
2019
8th EPZ Omloop van Borsele
8th Omloop van de IJsseldelta
2020
4th Omloop van de Westhoek - Memorial Stive Vermaut
6th Grand Prix International d'Isbergues
2021
3rd GP Eco-Struct
4th Omloop van de Westhoek - Memorial Stive Vermaut
9th Le Samyn
9th Overall Healthy Ageing Tour
9th Dwars door het Hageland WE
