= Teuntje Beekhuis =

Dutch cyclist (born 1995)

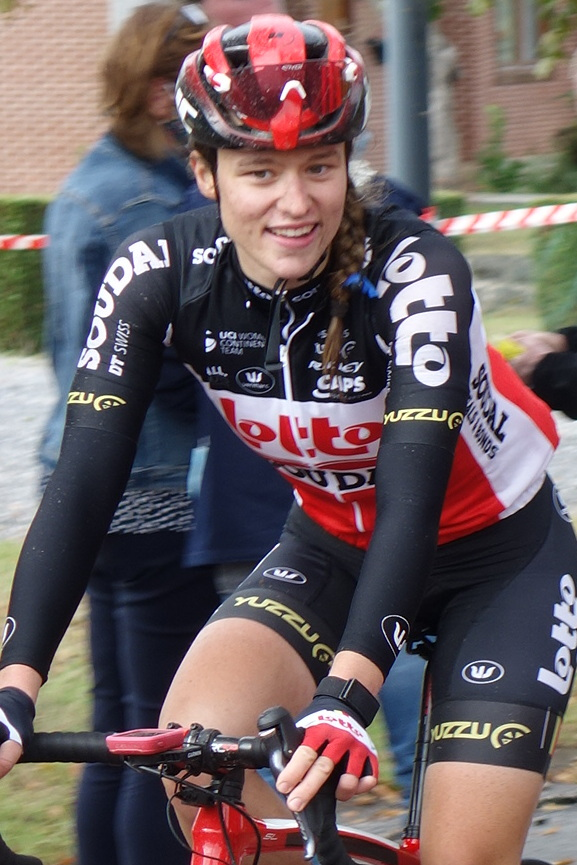
- Beekhuis in 2020

Personal information
- Full name: Teuntje Beekhuis
- Born: 18 August 1995 (age 31)

Cycling career
- Sport: Cycling
- Current team: Uno-X Mobility
- Disciplines: Road; Cyclo-cross
- Role: Rider
- Rider type: All-rounder

Amateur teams
- 2017: ESWV Squadra Veloce
- 2018: TWC de Kempen

Professional teams
- 2018: Parkhotel Valkenburg
- 2019: Biehler Pro Cycling
- 2020: Lotto–Soudal Ladies
- 2021–2023: Team Jumbo–Visma
- 2024–: Uno-X Mobility

Teuntje Beekhuis (born 18 August 1995) is a Dutch professional racing cyclist, who currently rides for UCI Women's WorldTeam Uno-X Mobility.

== Career ==
Beekhuis became a professional cyclist in 2018 after winning a talent day organized by the Parkhotel Valkenburg team. She signed to ride for the UCI Women's Team Biehler Pro Cycling for the 2019 women's road cycling season. Beekhuis showed to be a good climber during her first full season as a professional, with a 7th place in the second stage of the Vuelta a Burgos Feminas as her best result. At the end of 2019, Beekhuis was announced to join Lotto–Soudal Ladies for the 2020 women's road cycling season. For Lotto Soudal she completed the Giro Rosa finishing 65th place in the general classification. Her best result in 2020 was a 13th position in Omloop van het Hageland.

In October 2020, it was announced that Beekhuis had signed to become a member of the 12-rider Team Jumbo–Visma roster for its first season in 2021.

== Major results ==
2021
8th Overall Healthy Ageing Tour
2023
7th Overall RideLondon Classique
2025
7th Surf Coast Classic
