= De Skâns-Oostmahorn =

- Village
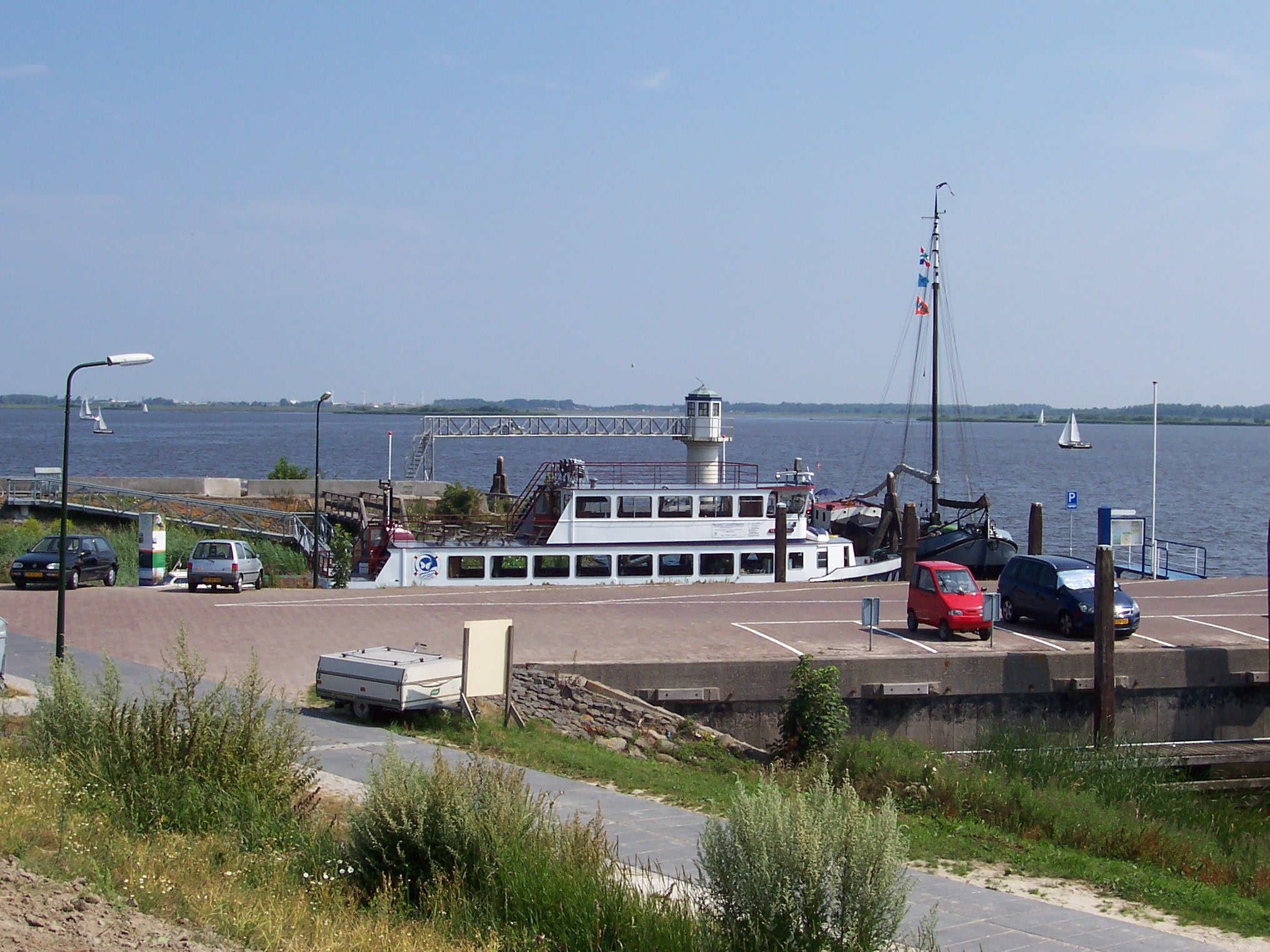
- De Skâns-Oostmahorn ferry

- Flag Coat of arms

- Location of De Skâns-Oostmahorn in the province of Friesland
- Coordinates: 53°22′51″N 6°09′37″E
- Country: Netherlands
- Province: Friesland
- Municipality: Noardeast-Fryslân

Area
  - Total: 0.69 km^{2} (0.27 sq mi)
- Elevation: 0.3 m (0.98 ft)

Population (2021)
  - Total: 85
  - Density: 120/km^{2} (320/sq mi)
- Time zone: UTC+1 (CET)
  - Summer (DST): UTC+2 (CEST)
- Postal code: 9133
- Dialing code: 0519

De Skâns-Oostmahorn is a village in the Dutch province of Friesland. It is located in the municipality Noardeast-Fryslân and had, as of January 2017, a population of 65. Before 2019, the village was part of the Dongeradeel municipality.

Before 2006 the village was part of Eanjum. De Skâns-Oostmahorn is located on the west-side of the Lauwersmeer. The ferry to Schiermonnikoog that had previously left from De Skâns-Oostmahorn now leaves from Lauwersoog. Esonstad is a nearby holiday village.

== History ==
The village was first mentioned in 1543 as Oes(t)mehorne, and means eastern settlement.

De Skâns-Oostmahorn was conquered by the geus (freedom fighter during the Dutch Revolt) Bartholt Entens van Mentheda who constructed a sconce near the village. The sconce was unsuccessfully attacked in 1576 by the Spanish colonel Caspar Robles. A coastal battery was built in its place in the late 18th century, and remained in service until 1849.

In 1840, De Skâns-Oostmahorn was home to 66 people.

The village's official name was changed from Oostmahorn to De Skâns-Oostmahorn in 2023.

== Gallery ==
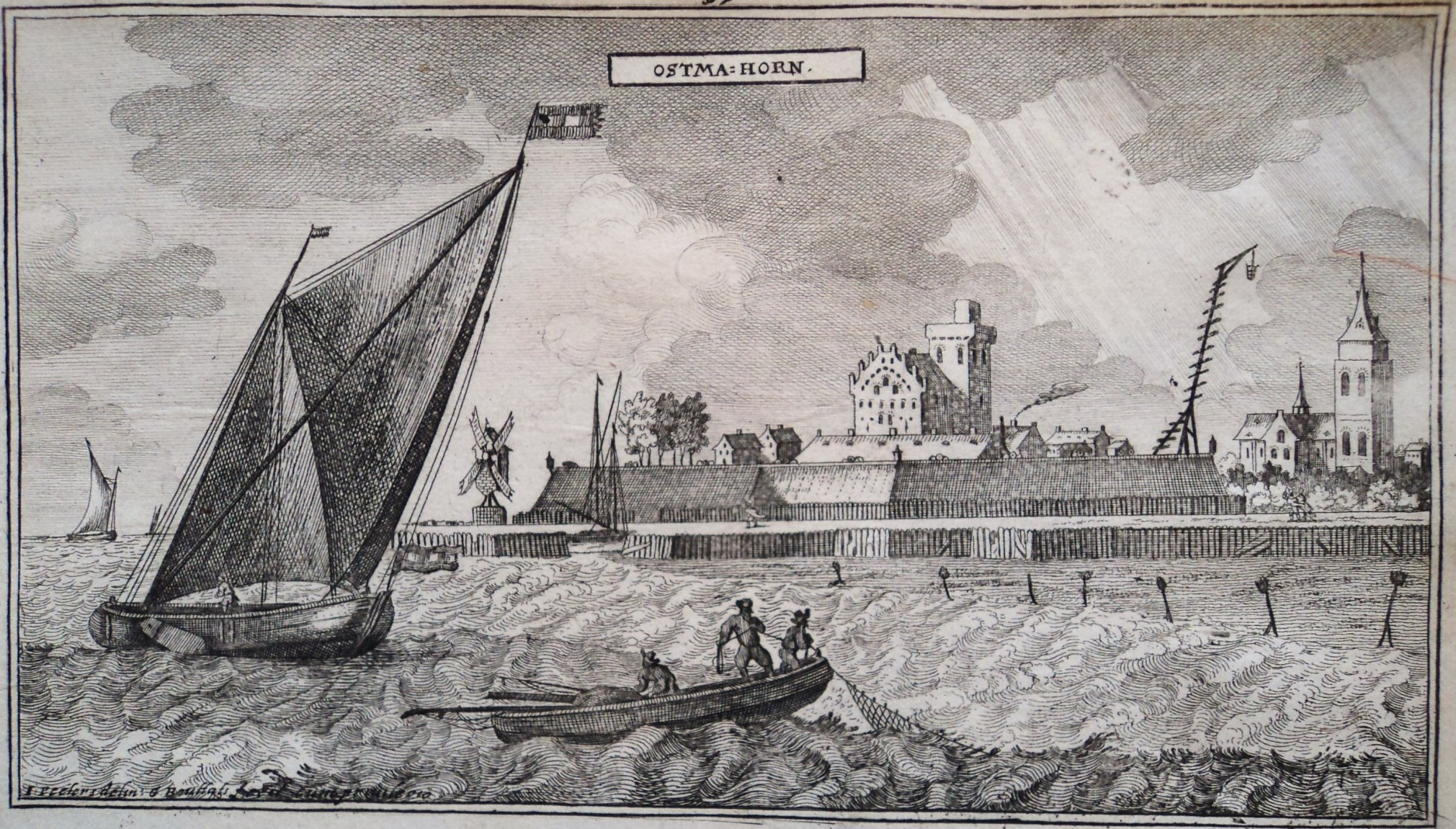
Oostmahorn by Gaspar Bouttats

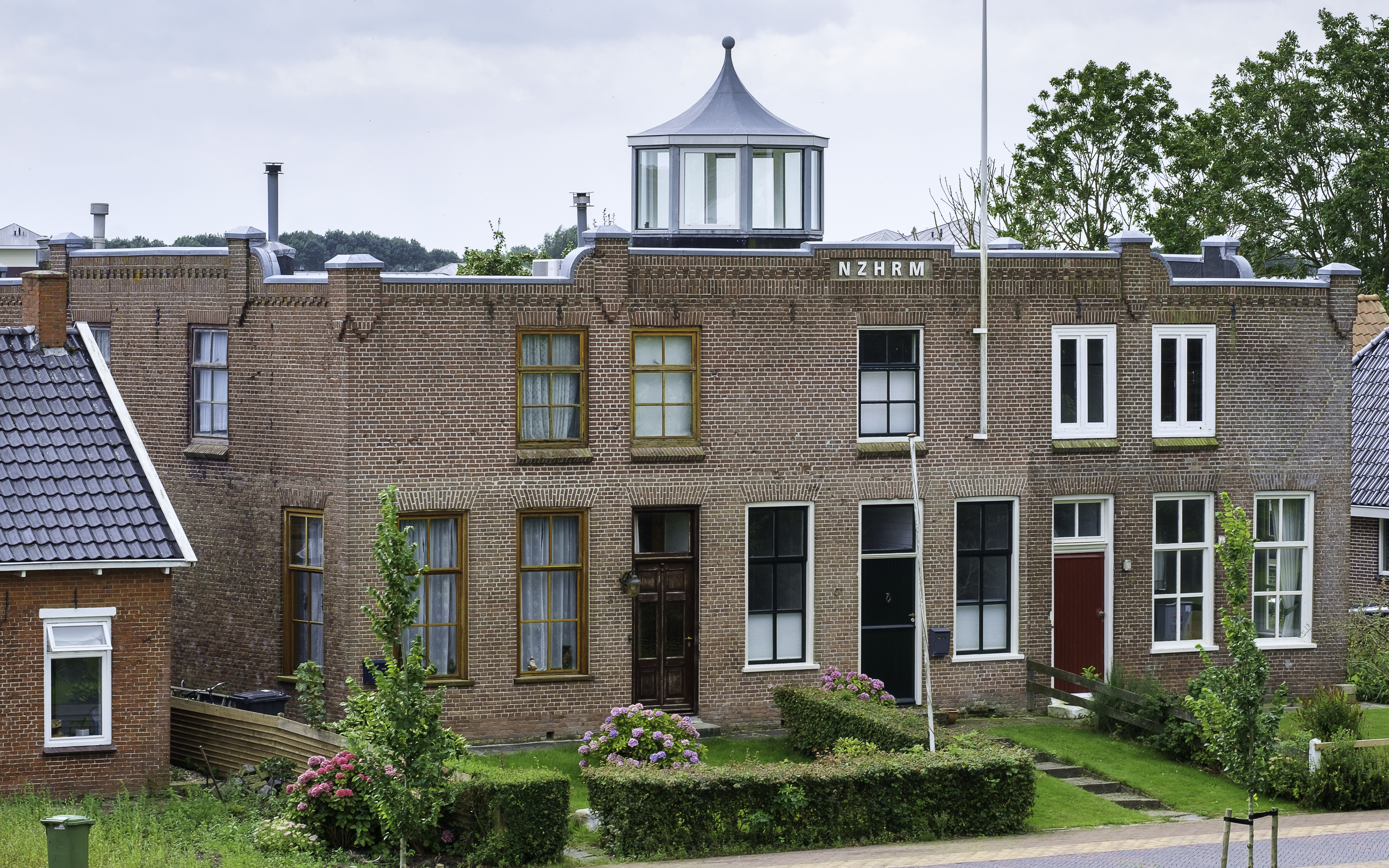
Former building of maritime pilots and sea rescue

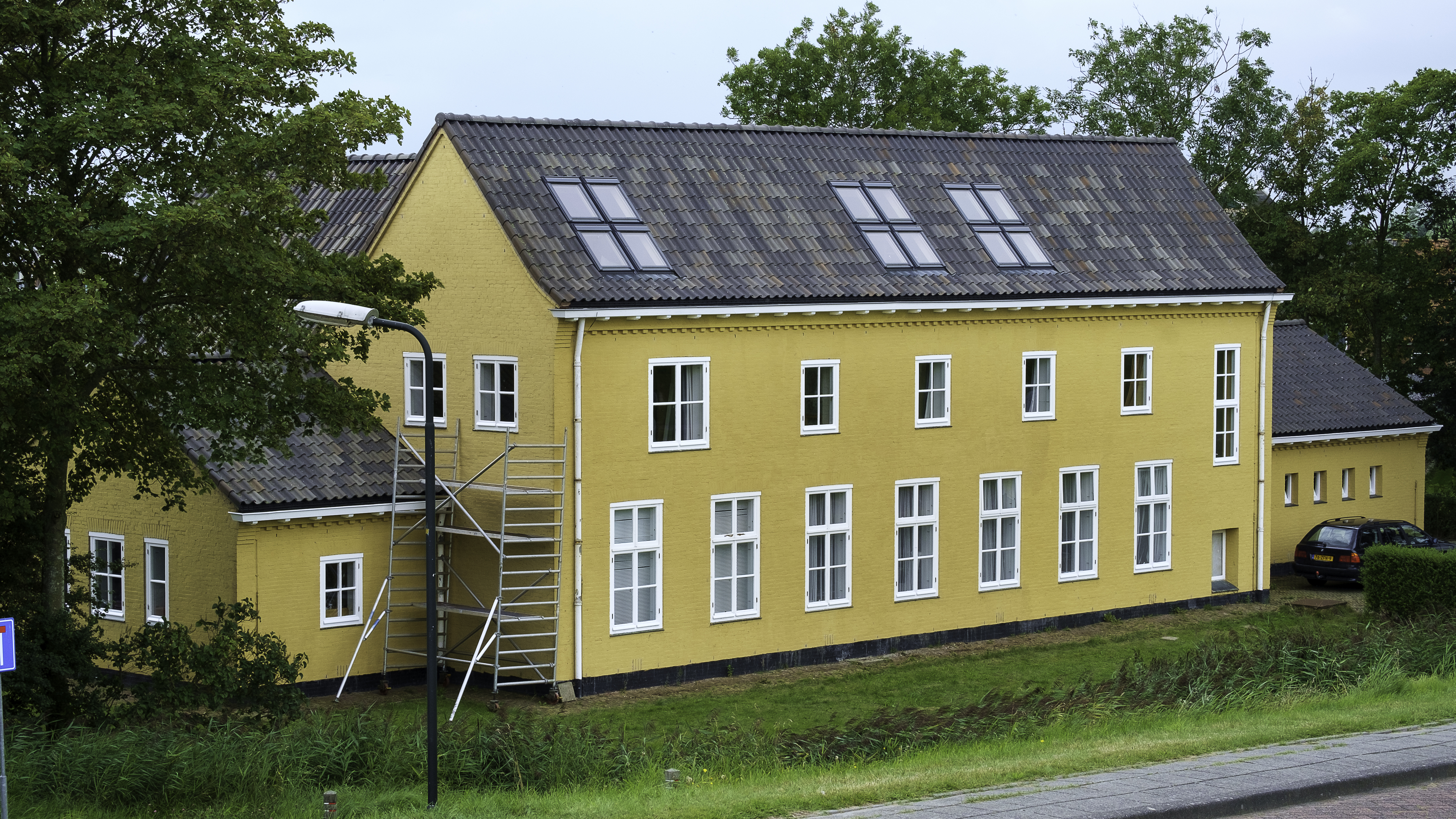
Former telecommunication building

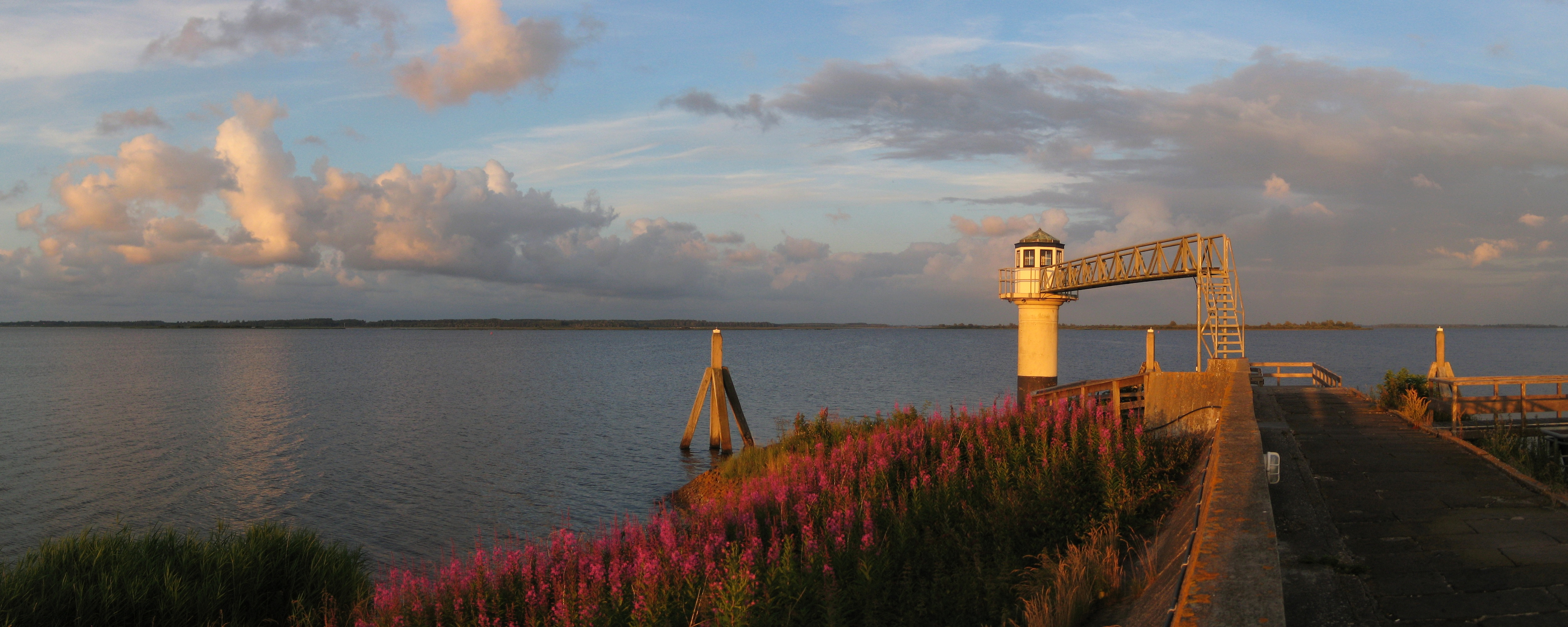
The Oostmahorn tide gauge, with view on the Lauwersmeer
