= Lauwersmeer =

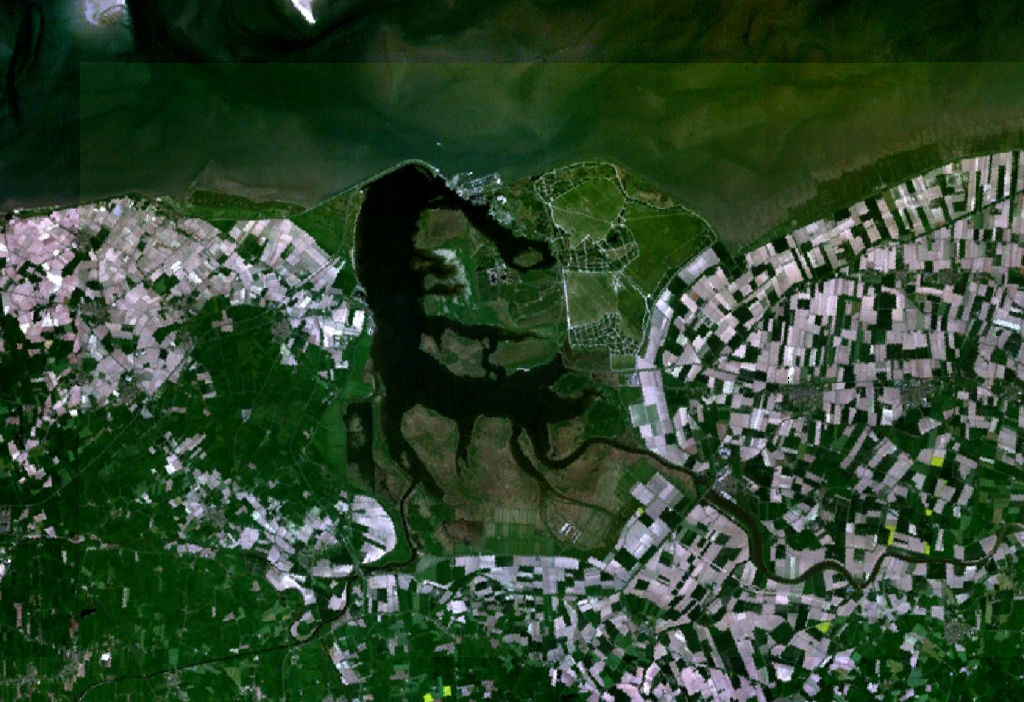
- Satellite image

- Location within Friesland
- Location: Groningen, Friesland
- Coordinates: 53°23′N 6°11′E
- Type: artificial lake
- Primary inflows: Lauwers River
- Primary outflows: Wadden Sea
- Basin countries: Netherlands
- Settlements: Marnewaard

Ramsar Wetland
- Designated: 29 August 2000
- Reference no.: 1247

Lauwersmeer (Dutch pronunciation: [ˌlʌu.ərsˈmeːr]) is a man-made lake in the north of the Netherlands, on the border of the provinces of Groningen and Friesland. The lake was formed on 23 May 1969, when the dike between the bay called Lauwers Sea and the Wadden Sea was closed. It is noted for birdwatching.

On the eastern shores of the Lauwersmeer is the Marnewaard, an exercise area of the Royal Netherlands Army. The central and eastern parts of the lake became Lauwersmeer National Park on 12 November 2003.

== History ==
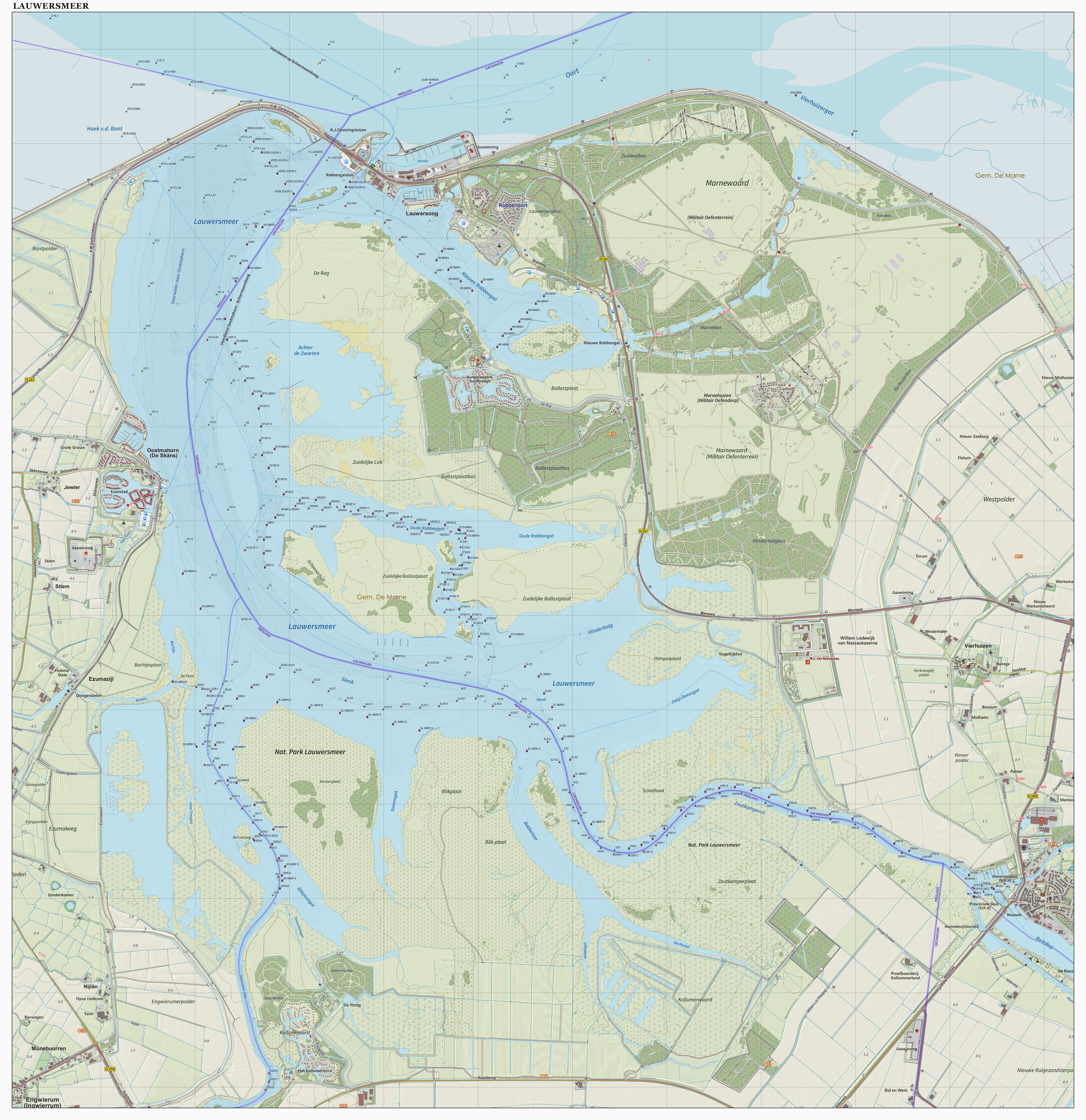
Lauwersmeer lake, June 2015

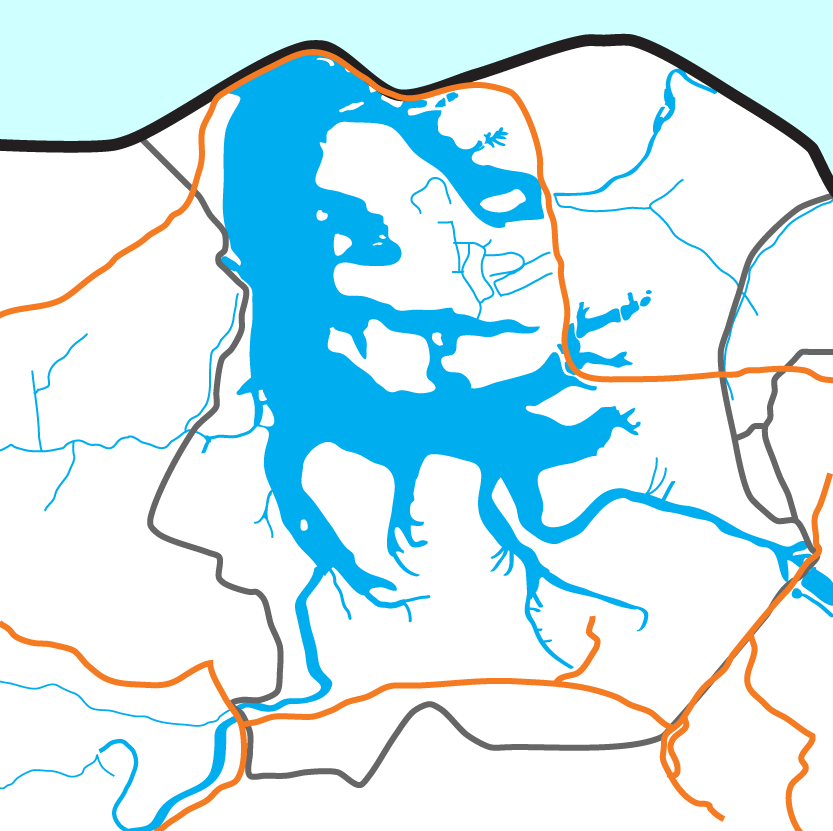
Overview of the Lauwersmeer

The Lauwers Sea (in Dutch: Lauwerszee) was formed by a flood in 1280, and named after the river Lauwers, which flows along the border between the provinces of Groningen and Friesland. During the flood the mouth of the river Lauwers disappeared, and its tributaries the Reitdiep, the Dokkumerdiep, and the Ee flowed directly into the new bay. Many plans were made after this disaster to shut it off from the sea but none was ever put into effect. However, parts of it were empoldered piecemeal, slowly reducing it from a large two-forked estuary to the nearly square inlet seen on recent maps.

The first serious plans for draining the Lauwers Sea were from 1849. In the 1930s a commission came up with several plans but all were shelved and were never accomplished. The flood disaster of 1953 and the Christmas flood of 1954 made clear that something had to be done. In 1958 the New Delta Law ordered a reinforcement of the dikes in the north of the Netherlands. At the Lauwers Sea there were two options: to reinforce the existing dikes around the Lauwers Sea (32 km of dikes) or to make a 13 km dam separating the Lauwers Sea and the Wadden Sea. After a study found that the 13 km dike plan was more expensive than the 32 km plan, the government decided on the cheaper option.

The people living in the area resisted and a committee was formed (actiecomité "Lauwerszee"). They collected 135,000 signatures of people who wanted to close the Lauwers Sea. In Leeuwarden a large gathering was organised to show the government that local people did not agree with the decision. On 10 June 1960 Kabinet-De Quay decided to enclose the Lauwers Sea, agreeing to share the cost with the Provinces of Groningen and Friesland, which also agreed to maintain the dike upon completion.

The 13-kilometer-long dike has sluices and a canal lock. A new harbour called Lauwersoog was built part-way along the dike. Final enclosure and separation from the Wadden Sea took place on 25 May 1969; since then it has been called the Lauwersmeer.

New flora and fauna appeared as the Lauwerszee gradually became a freshwater lake, and to protect this new and young nature area, it was decided (12 November 2003) to designate the Lauwersmeer as a national park. The ferry to Schiermonnikoog that had previously left from Oostmahorn now leaves from Lauwersoog.

There is a lack of agreement about whether to spell the former name as "Lauwersee" or "Lauwerszee". Some older maps show it as "Lauwerzee".

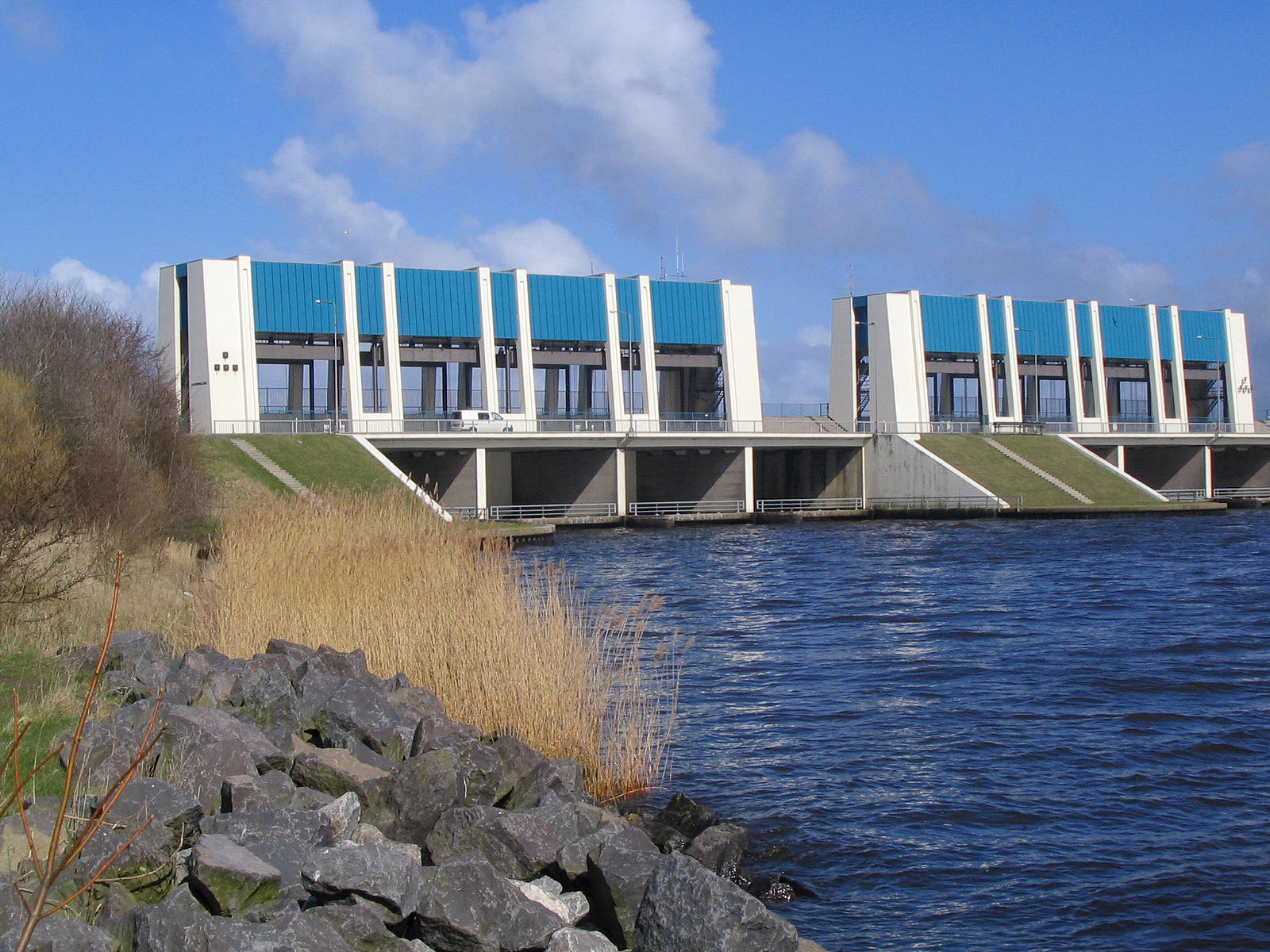
Sluice at Lauwersoog

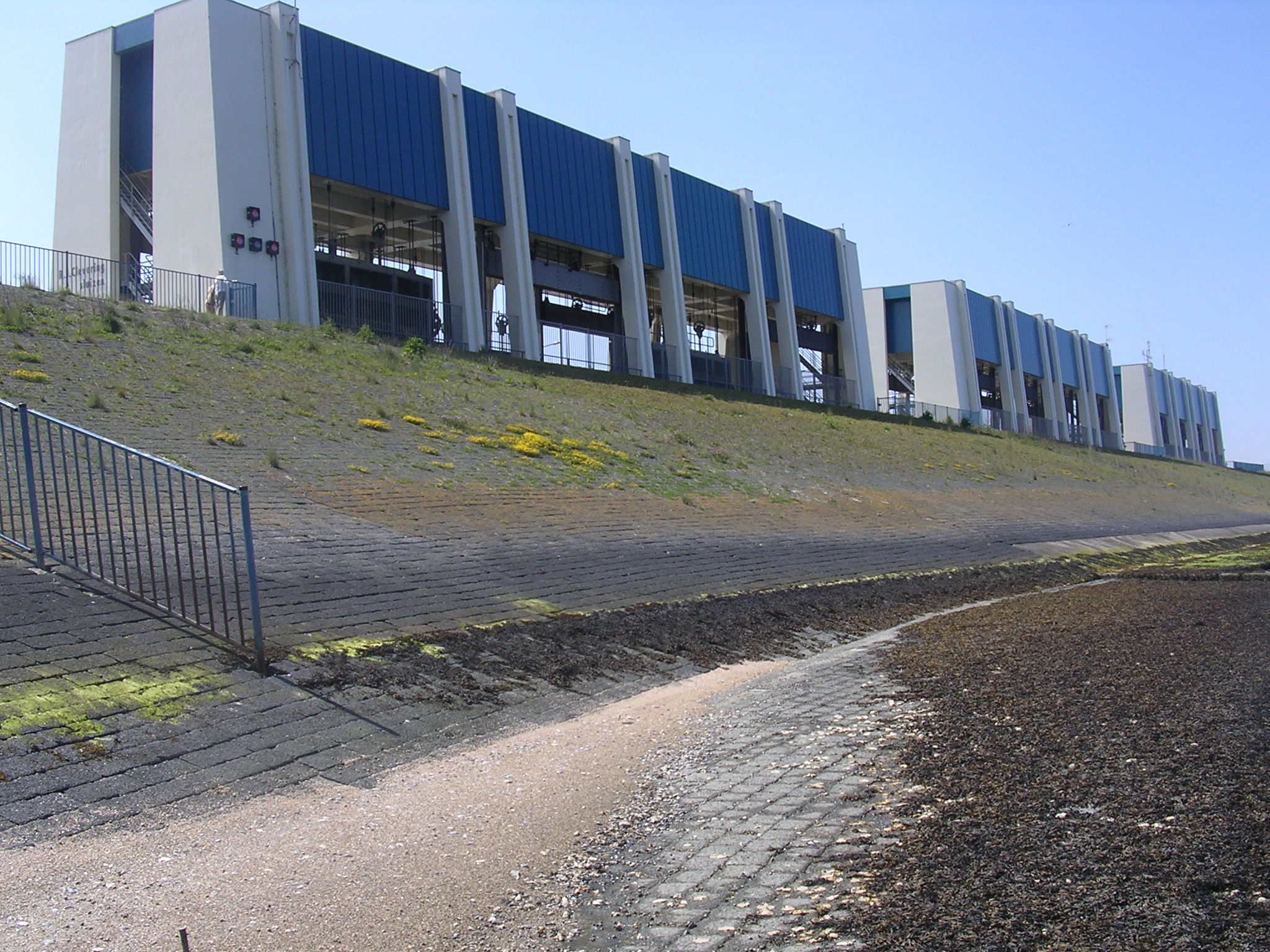
Sluice at Lauwersoog

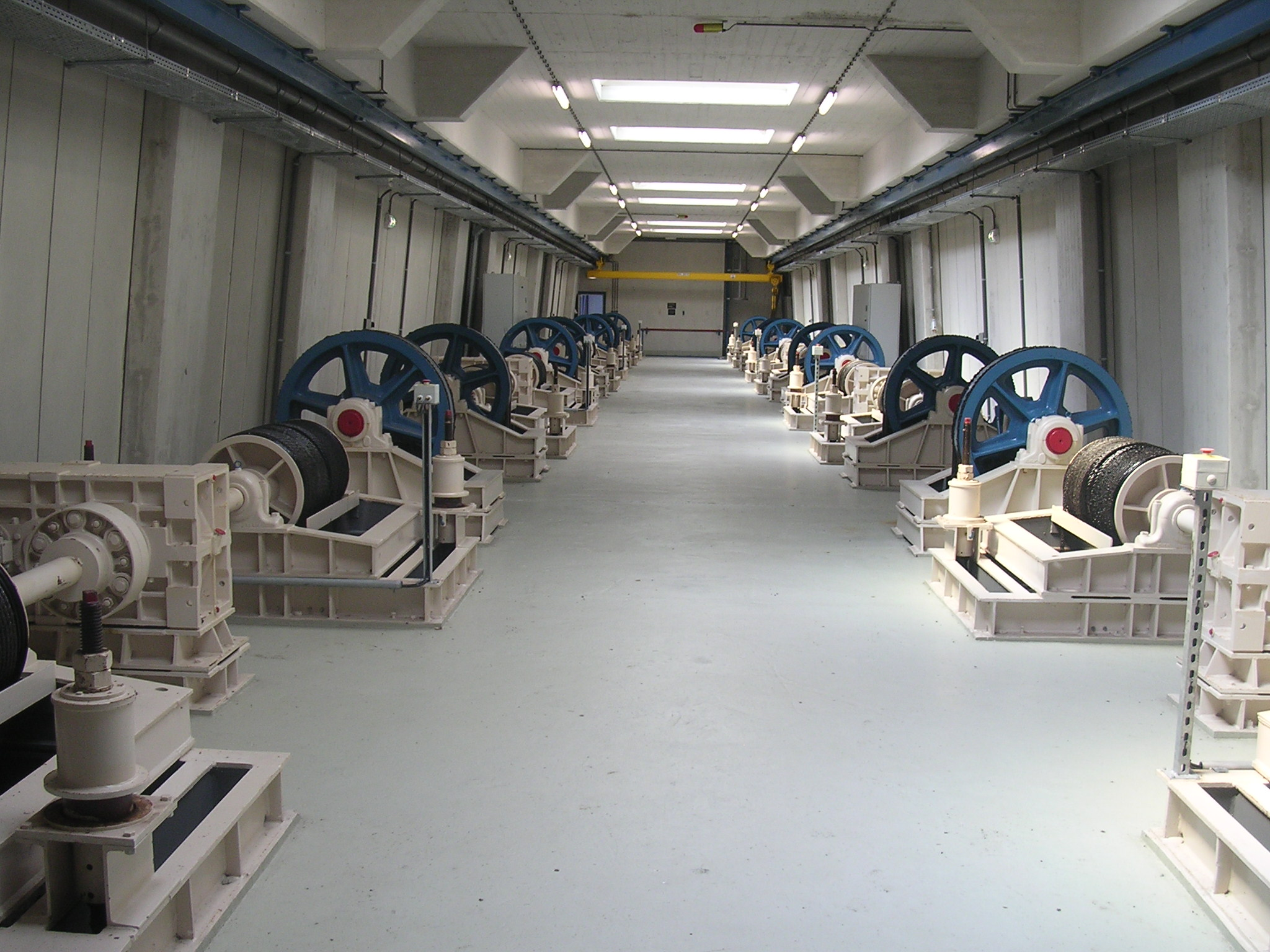
Sluice, engine room in the top of the building

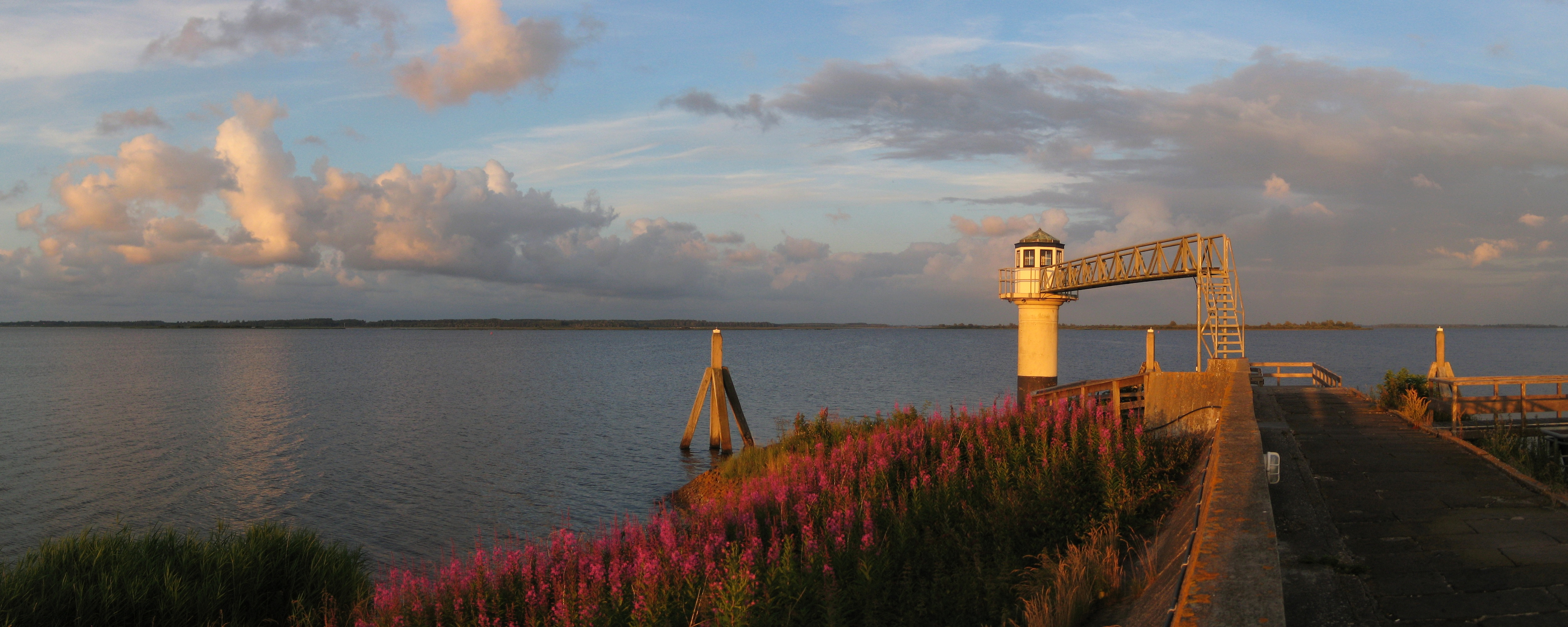
The lighthouse of Oostmahorn, with view on the Lauwersmeer

== See also ==
- Flood control in the Netherlands
- Zuiderzee Works
- Zuider Ee
