= Lauwersoog =

- Village and harbour
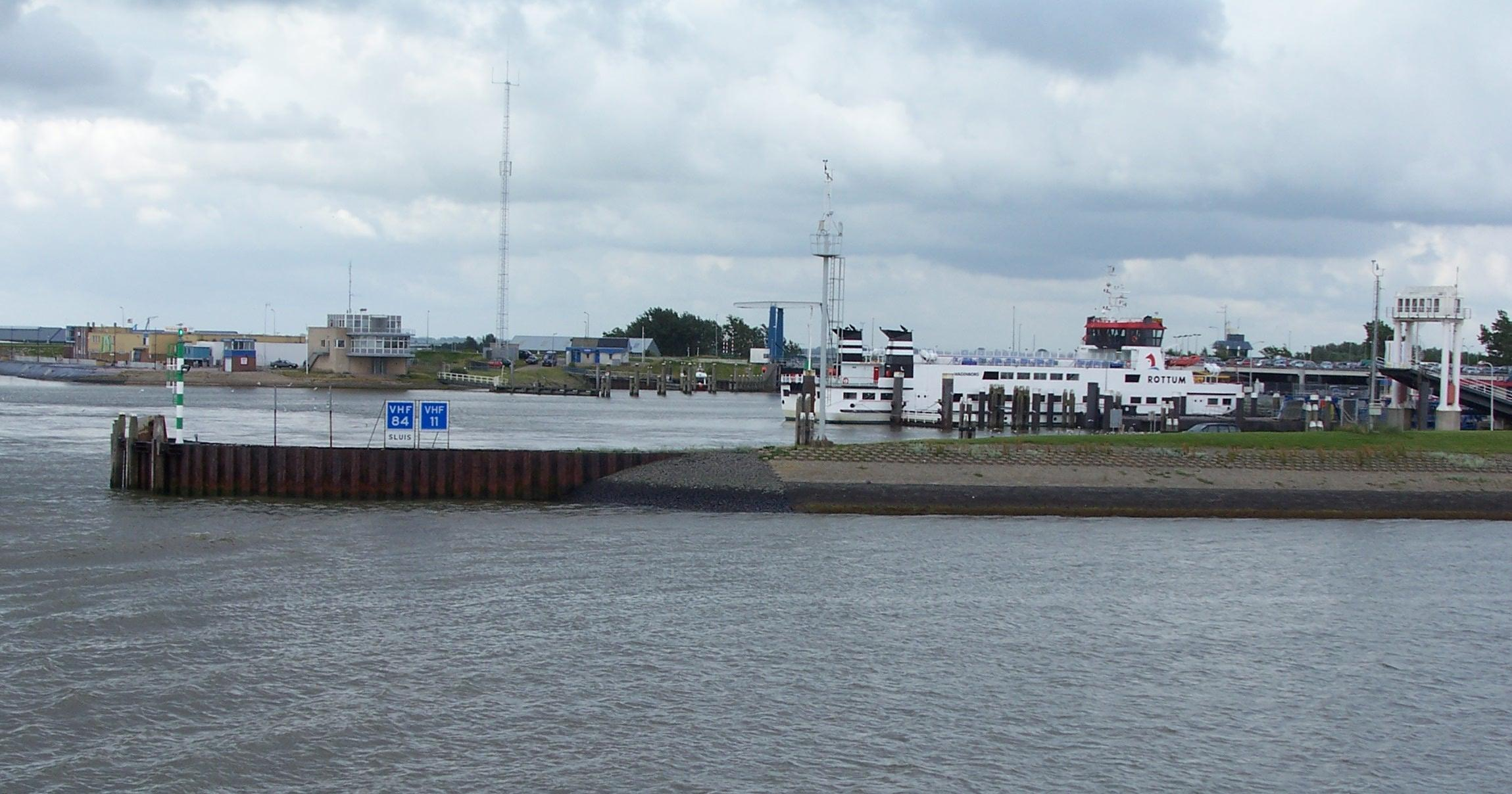
- Lauwersoog in 2008

- Location of Lauwersoog in the province of Groningen Lauwersoog (Netherlands)
- Coordinates: 53°24.23′N 6°13.13′E
- Country: Netherlands
- Province: Groningen
- Municipality: Het Hogeland
- Established: 1969

Area
  - Total: 0.37 km^{2} (0.14 sq mi)
- Elevation: 0 m (0 ft)

Population (2021)
  - Total: 130
  - Density: 350/km^{2} (910/sq mi)
- Time zone: UTC+1 (CET)
  - Summer (DST): UTC+2 (CEST)
- Postal code: 9976
- Dialing code: 0519

Lauwersoog is a seaside village and harbour in the province of Groningen, located in the northern part of the Netherlands. It is part of the municipality of Het Hogeland. It was established on 23 May 1969. The ferry to Schiermonnikoog departs from Lauwersoog.

== History ==
As part of the Zuiderzee Works, it was decided to transform the Lauwerszee (a bay) into the Lauwersmeer (lake). In 1969, a dike was completed on the border of the provinces of Friesland and Groningen which separates the Lauwersmeer from the Wadden Sea. The village and harbour were named Lauwersoog in 1964 based on a suggestion by Sip Sytsma who worked for the Ministry of Transport and Water Management, to match the nearby islands of Rottumeroog and Schiermonnikoog. The name received some criticism because -oog means island, and it is not an island.

On 23 May 1969, Lauwersoog was officially established. There was an agreement to locate the village in Groningen, however the decision was later disputed by Friesland. Groningen intended to use the harbour for recreational purposes only, because they were constructing the Eemshaven, as a new main harbour. Friesland and the Groninger fishing village of Zoutkamp desired a commercial harbour. In January 1970, the conflict was brought to the States General of the Netherlands.

Lauwersoog remained in Groningen, but did become a commercial harbour. It started to specialise in fishing. From 1973 onwards, many English and German fishers started using Lauwersoog to deliver their catch, and by 1986, it was one of the largest fishing harbours in the Netherlands. As a village, it was not very successful. It first appeared on maps in 1984 and has remained small.

== Transport ==
The ferry to Schiermonnikoog departs from Lauwersoog.

Qbuzz provides a bus service (route 163 Groningen - Lauwersoog - Holwerd) and Arriva (bus route 50 Leeuwarden - Lauwersoog). They connect with the departures of the ferry to Schiermonnikoog.

Lauwersoog can be reached by car from Leeuwarden and the city of Groningen via the N361.

== Coastal trails ==
The E9 European long distance path passes through Lauwersoog. The Friese Kustpad is a long-distance trail from Stavoren to Lauwersoog (131 kilometres (81 mi)).

== Gallery ==
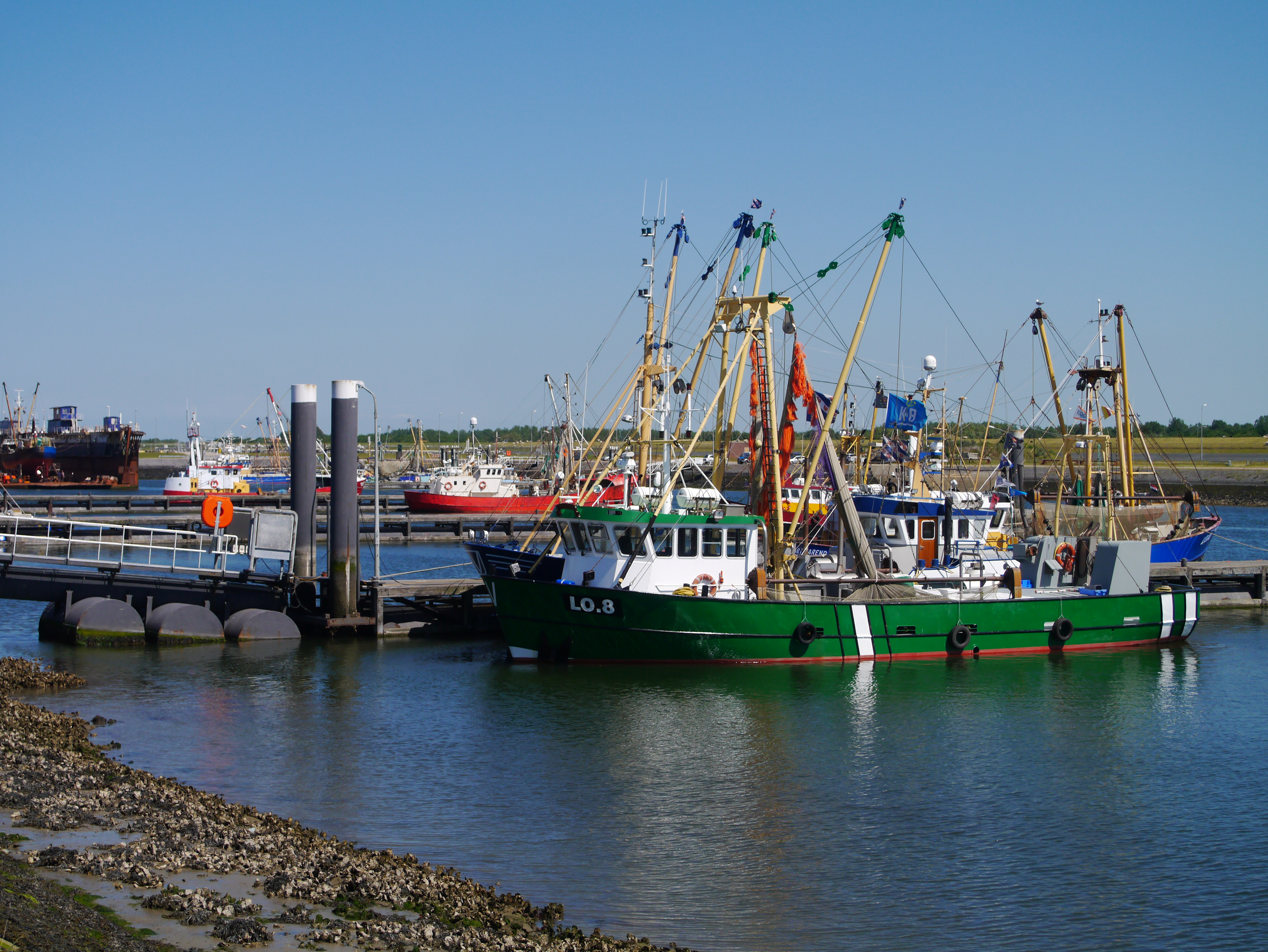
Fishing port

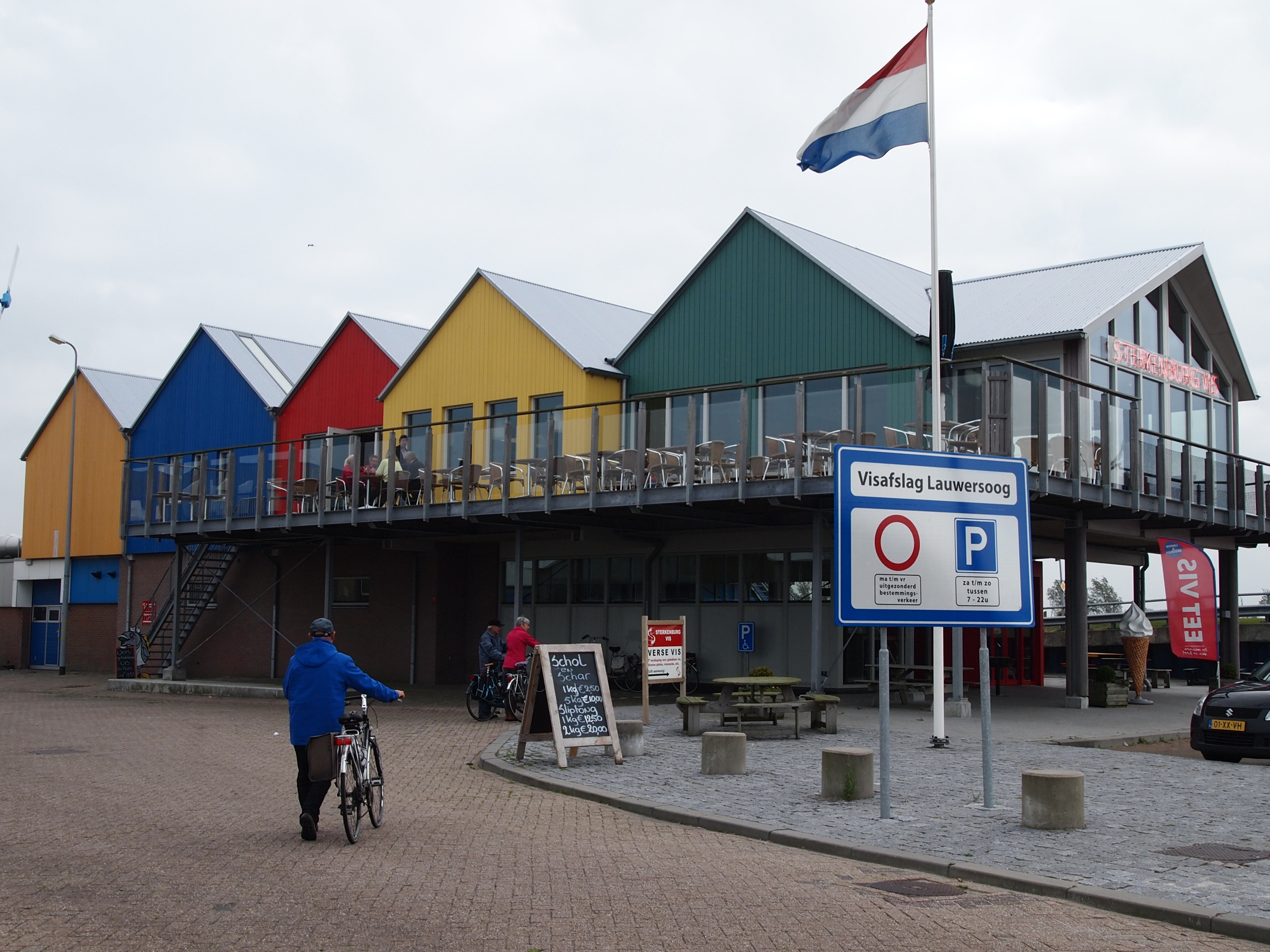
Fish restaurant

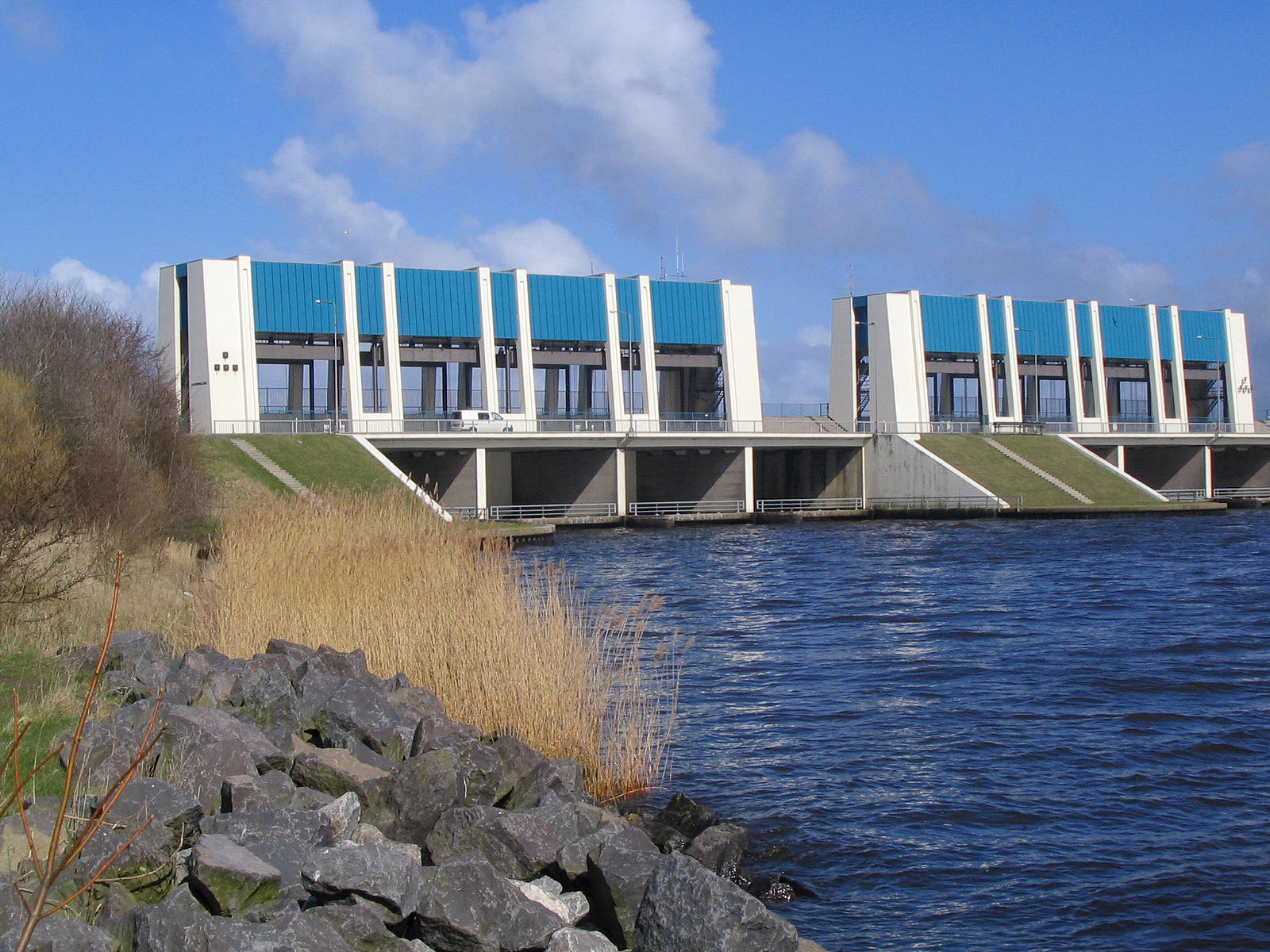
Sluice at Lauwersoog

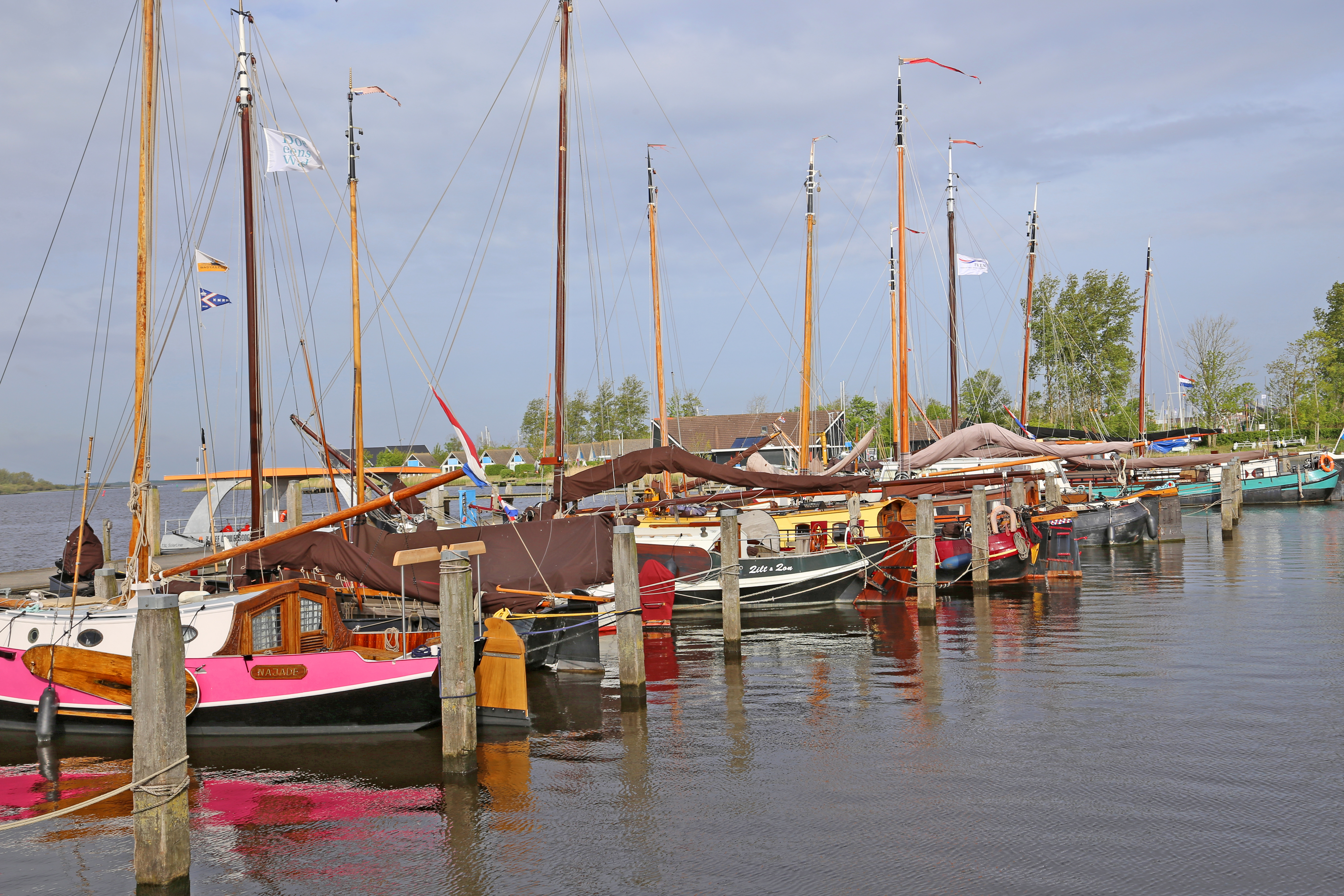
Boats in the harbour
