= Cycling at the 2019 European Games – Women's road race =

Cycling race

Women's road race at the 2019 European Games
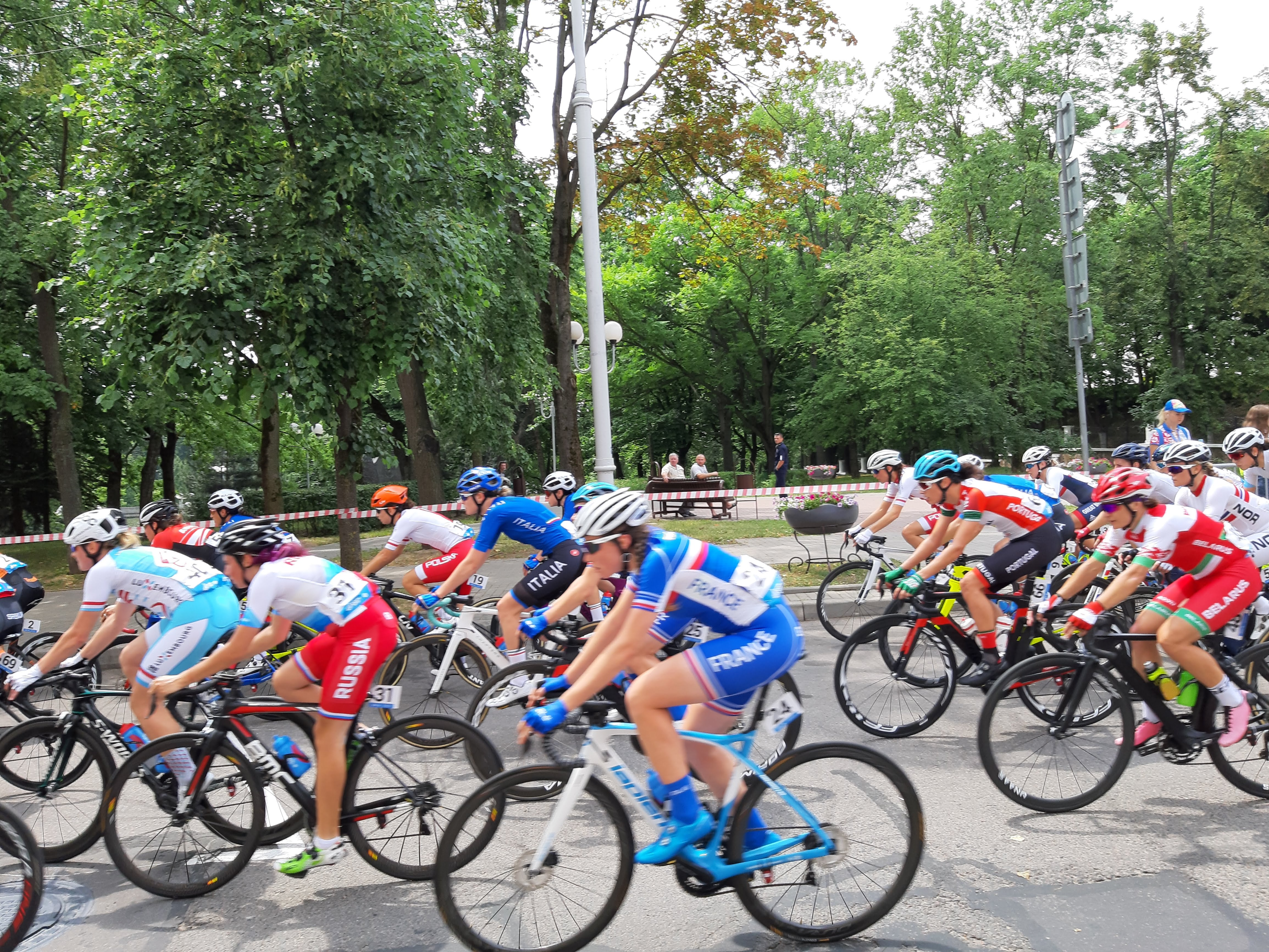
- Venue: Minsk (120 km)
- Date: 22 June
- Competitors: 72 from 26 nations
- Winning time: 3h 08' 13"

Medalists
gold medal	Lorena Wiebes	Netherlands
silver medal	Marianne Vos	Netherlands
bronze medal	Tatsiana Sharakova	Belarus

The women's road race cycling event at the 2019 European Games in Minsk took place on 22 June.

== Results ==
Rank	Rider	Nation	Time
1st place, gold medalist(s)	Lorena Wiebes	Netherlands	3h 08' 13"
2nd place, silver medalist(s)	Marianne Vos	Netherlands	s.t.
3rd place, bronze medalist(s)	Tatsiana Sharakova	Belarus	s.t.
4	Alice Barnes	Great Britain	s.t.
5	Elisa Balsamo	Italy	s.t.
6	Susanne Andersen	Norway	s.t.
7	Liane Lippert	Germany	s.t.
8	Letizia Paternoster	Italy	s.t.
9	Rasa Leleivytė	Lithuania	s.t.
10	Eugenia Bujak	Slovenia	s.t.
11	Kathrin Schweinberger	Austria	s.t.
12	Roxane Fournier	France	s.t.
13	Christine Majerus	Luxembourg	s.t.
14	Katarzyna Wilkos	Poland	s.t.
15	Alena Amialiusik	Belarus	s.t.
16	Anna Henderson	Great Britain	s.t.
17	Marta Cavalli	Italy	+ 9"
18	Marlen Reusser	Switzerland	+ 11"
19	Yelyzaveta Oshurkova	Russia	s.t.
20	Tetyana Riabchenko	Ukraine	s.t.
21	Diana Klimova	Russia	s.t.
22	Andrea Waldis	Switzerland	s.t.
23	Christa Riffel	Germany	s.t.
24	Rotem Gafinovitz	Israel	s.t.
25	Alice Sharpe	Ireland	s.t.
26	Clara Koppenburg	Germany	s.t.
27	Marta Lach	Poland	s.t.
28	Daniela Reis	Portugal	s.t.
29	Valeriya Kononenko	Ukraine	s.t.
30	Amy Pieters	Netherlands	s.t.
31	Mia Radotić	Croatia	s.t.
32	Nikola Nosková	Czech Republic	s.t.
33	Agnieszka Skalniak	Poland	s.t.
34	Urša Pintar	Slovenia	s.t.
35	Pascale Jeuland	France	s.t.
36	Jelena Erić	Serbia	+ 19"
37	Romy Kasper	Germany	+ 22"
38	Małgorzata Jasińska	Poland	+ 24"
39	Martina Alzini	Italy	+30"
40	Gladys Verhulst	France	s.t.
41	Jarmila Machačová	Czech Republic	s.t.
42	Anastasiya Kolesava	Belarus	s.t.
43	Polina Kirillova	Russia	s.t.
44	Mae Lang	Estonia	s.t.
45	Elise Maes	Luxembourg	s.t.
46	Claire Faber	Luxembourg	s.t.
47	Maëlle Grossetête	France	s.t.
48	Maria Novolodskaya	Russia	s.t.
49	Antri Christoforou	Cyprus	s.t.
50	Emilie Moberg	Norway	s.t.
51	Nicola Juniper	Great Britain	s.t.
52	Sarah Rijkes	Austria	s.t.
53	Varvara Fasoi	Greece	s.t.
54	Monika Brzeźna	Poland	s.t.
55	Anna van der Breggen	Netherlands	+ 43"
56	Taisa Naskovich	Belarus	+ 1' 23"
57	Alžbeta Bačíková	Slovakia	s.t.
58	Maria Giulia Confalonieri	Italy	s.t.
59	Anne-Sophie Harsch	Luxembourg	s.t.
60	Hayley Simmonds	Great Britain	s.t.
61	Rhona Callander	Great Britain	s.t.
62	Hannah Ludwig	Germany	s.t.
63	Eugénie Duval	France	s.t.
64	Omer Shapira	Israel	s.t.
65	Hanna Tserakh	Belarus	s.t.
66	Chantal Blaak	Netherlands	s.t.
67	Urška Bravec	Slovenia	+ 12' 49"
68	Silvija Pacevičienė	Lithuania	s.t.
69	Chantal Hoffmann	Luxembourg	+ 12' 51"
	Daria Malkova	Russia	DNF
	Maria Martins	Portugal	DNF
	Keziban Koyun	Turkey	DNF
