= Netherlands at the 2019 European Games =

- IOC code: NED
- NOC: NOC*NSF
- Website: www.nocnsf.nl

in Minsk, Belarus 21 – 30 June 2019
- Competitors: 90 in 12 sports
- Flag bearer: Nouchka Fontijn
- Medals Ranked 5th: Gold 9 Silver 13 Bronze 7 Total 29

European Games appearances (overview)
- 2015; 2019; 2023; 2027

Netherlands competed at the 2019 European Games, in Minsk, Belarus from 21 to 30 June 2019. Netherlands has previously competed at the 2015 European Games in Baku, Azerbaijan, where it won 29 medals, including eight golds.

== Medalists ==
Medal	Name	Sport	Event	Date
Gold	Mike Schloesser	Archery	Men's individual compound	
Gold	Selena Piek; Cheryl Seinen	Badminton	Women's doubles	
Gold	Lorena Wiebes	Cycling	Women's road race	
Gold	Harrie Lavreysen	Cycling	Men's keirin	
Gold	Jan-Willem van Schip	Cycling	Men's omnium	
Gold	Jeffrey Hoogland	Cycling	Men's sprint	
Gold	Jeffrey Hoogland; Roy van den Berg; Harrie Lavreysen; Nils van 't Hoenderdaal	Cycling	Men's team sprint	
Gold	Kirsten Wild	Cycling	Women's omnium	
Gold	Kirsten Wild	Cycling	Women's scratch	
Silver	Marianne Vos	Cycling	Women's road race	
Silver	Chantal Blaak	Cycling	Women's time trial	
Silver	Mike Schloesser; Sanne de Laat	Archery	Mixed team compound	
Silver	Steve Wijler	Archery	Men's individual recurve	
Silver	Nouchka Fontijn	Boxing	Women's 75 kg	
Silver	Shanne Braspennincx	Cycling	Women's keirin	
Silver	Kirsten Wild; Amber van der Hulst	Cycling	Women's madison	
Silver	Yoeri Havik; Jan-Willem van Schip	Cycling	Men's madison	
Silver	Harrie Lavreysen	Cycling	Men's sprint	
Silver	Jan-Willem van Schip	Cycling	Men's points race	
Silver	Sanne van Dijke	Judo	Women's 70 kg	
Silver	Guusje Steenhuis	Judo	Women's 78 kg	
Bronze	Gabriela Bayardo	Archery	Women's individual recurve	
Bronze	Enrico Lacruz	Boxing	Men's 64 kg	
Bronze	Jemyma Betrian	Boxing	Women's 57 kg	
Bronze	Kyra Lamberink; Shanne Braspennincx; Hetty van de Wouw	Cycling	Women's team sprint	
Bronze	Henk Grol	Judo	Men's +100 kg	
Bronze	Sanne Vermeer	Judo	Women's 63 kg	
Bronze	Selena Piek; Cheryl Seinen	Badminton	Men's doubles	

Medals by sport
Sport	1st place, gold medalist(s)	2nd place, silver medalist(s)	3rd place, bronze medalist(s)	Total
Cycling	7	7	1	15
Archery	1	3	1	5
Badminton	1	0	1	2
Judo	0	2	2	4
Boxing	0	1	2	3
Total	9	13	7	29

== Archery ==
Recurve

Athlete	Event	Ranking round		Round of 64	Round of 32	Round of 16	Quarterfinals	Semifinals	Final / BM	
Athlete	Event	Score	Seed	Opposition Score	Opposition Score	Opposition Score	Opposition Score	Opposition Score	Opposition Score	Rank
Sjef van den Berg	Men's individual	679	3	Bye	Henckels (ITA); W 6–2	Olaru (MDA); L 5–6	Did not advance			
Jan van Tongeren	Men's individual	668	9	Bye	Pasqualucci (ITA); L 3–7	Did not advance				
Steve Wijler	Men's individual	667	10	Bye	Mihalić (CRO); W 7–1	Banda (HUN); W 6–5	Dalidovich (BLR); W 6–5	Acha (ESP); W 7–3	Nespoli (ITA); L 4–6	2nd place, silver medalist(s)
Gabriela Bayardo	Women's individual	666 GR	1	Bye	Unruh (GER); W 7–1	Bettles (GBR); W 6–2	Dziominskaya (BLR); W 6–5	Andreoli (ITA); L 2–6	Balsukova (RUS); W 7–1	3rd place, bronze medalist(s)
Sjef van den Berg; Jan van Tongeren; Steve Wijler	Men's team	2014	2	—N/a			Belarus; W 6–0	Spain; W 5–1	France; L 4–5	2nd place, silver medalist(s)
Sjef van den Berg; Gabriela Bayardo	Mixed team	1345 GR	1	—N/a	Bye	Georgia; W 5–4	Belarus; L 3–5	Did not advance		

Compound

Athlete	Event	Ranking round		Round of 16	Quarterfinals	Semifinals	Final / BM	
Athlete	Event	Score	Seed	Opposition Score	Opposition Score	Opposition Score	Opposition Score	Rank
Mike Schloesser	Men's individual	707	2	Trachsel (GER); W 149–148	Çağıran (TUR); W 147–144	Vavro (CRO); W 145–141	Seywert (LUX); W 145–144	1st place, gold medalist(s)
Sanne de Laat	Women's individual	681	10	Mlinarić (CRO); W 144–142	Avdeeva (RUS); L 147–143	Did not advance		
Mike Schloesser; Sanne de Laat	Mixed team	1398	2	Bye	Great Britain; W 155–147	Croatia; W 150–142	Russia; L 152 (17) –152 (18)	2nd place, silver medalist(s)

== Badminton ==
Athletes	Event	Group stage				Round of 16	Quarterfinals	Semifinals	Final	Rank
Athletes	Event	Opposition Score	Opposition Score	Opposition Score	Rank	Opposition Score	Opposition Score	Opposition Score	Opposition Score	Rank
Mark Caljouw	Men's singles	Atilano (POR); W 21–8, 21-19	Savin (MDA); W 21–14, 21-16	Rogalski (POL); W 21–18, 21-14	1 Q	Qowimuramadhoni (AZE); W 21–12, 17–21, 21-14	Zilberman (ISR); L 21–12, 17–21, 15-21	Did not advance		
Soraya de Visch Eijbergen	Women's singles	Pavlinić (CRO); W 21–13, 21-16	Cherniavskaya (BLR); W 21–13, 21-9	Corrales (ESP) w/o	1 Q	Jaquet (SUI); L 16–21, 21–16, 21-13	Did not advance			
Jelle Maas; Robin Tabeling	Men's doubles	Greco / Strobl (ITA); W 21–15, 21-11	~~Bochat / Cwalina (POL)~~; ~~W 21–18, 19–21, 21-13~~	Astrup / Rasmussen (DEN); L 20–22, 12-21	2 Q	—N/a	Lamsfuß / Seidel (GER); W 16–21, 21–17, 21-18	Ellis / Langridge (GBR); L 18–21, 16-21	Did not advance	3rd place, bronze medalist(s)
Selena Piek; Cheryl Seinen	Women's doubles	Goliszewski / Kāpplein (GER); W 21–19, 21-14	Bášová / Fuchsová (CZE); W 21–11, 21-9	Erçetin / İnci (TUR); W 21–12, 21-14	1 Q	—N/a	Fruergaard / Thygesen (DEN); W 21–13, 21-14	Bolotova / Davletova (RUS); W 18–21, 21–14, 21-14	Birch / Smith (GBR); W 14–21, 21–13, 21-15	1st place, gold medalist(s)
Robin Tabeling; Selena Piek	Mixed doubles	~~Zilberman / Zilberman (ISR)~~; ~~W 21–10, 21-10~~	Lamsfuß / Herttrich (GER); W 21–17, 21-8	Świerczyńska / Śmiłowski (POL); W 21–12, 14–21, 22-10	1 Q	—N/a	Magee / Magee (IRL); L 19–21, 17-21	Did not advance		

== Basketball 3x3 ==
Team roster

Men

- Mack Bruining
- Jaouad Darib
- Jan Driessen
- Lenno Witteveen

Women

- Janis Boonstra
- Laura Cornelius
- Janine Guijt
- Rowie Jongeling

Summary

Team	Event	Group stage				Quarterfinals	Semifinals	Final / BM	
Team	Event	Opposition Score	Opposition Score	Opposition Score	Rank	Opposition Score	Opposition Score	Opposition Score	Rank
Netherlands men's	Men's tournament	Latvia; W 20–17	Czech Republic; L 16–18	Turkey; L 19–20	3	Did not advance			
Netherlands women's	Women's tournament	France; L 8–18	Switzerland; W 18–14	Andorra; W 16–7	2 Q	Belarus; L 11–15	Did not advance		

== Boxing ==
Men

Athlete	Event	Round of 64	Round of 32	Round of 16	Quarterfinals	Semifinals	Final	
Athlete	Event	Opposition Result	Opposition Result	Opposition Result	Opposition Result	Opposition Result	Opposition Result	Rank
Enrico Lacruz	64 kg	—N/a	Gazibayov (AZE); W 5–0	Di Lerni (ITA); W 3–2	Erdemir (TUR); W 3–2	Bachkov (ARM); L 1–4	—N/a	3rd place, bronze medalist(s)
Max van der Pas	75 kg	—N/a	Etemi (MKD); W 5–0	Chartoi (SWE); L 1–4	Did not advance			
Artjom Kasparian	81 kg	—N/a	Cullhaj (ALB); W 5–0	Abu-Lubdeh (GER); L 2–3	Did not advance			
Peter Müllenberg	91 kg	—N/a	Sargsyan (ARM); W 4–1	Acar (TUR); W 3–2	Clarke (GBR); L 0–5	Did not advance		

Women

Athlete	Event	Round of 64	Round of 32	Round of 16	Quarterfinals	Semifinals	Final	
Athlete	Event	Opposition Result	Opposition Result	Opposition Result	Opposition Result	Opposition Result	Opposition Result	Rank
Jemyma Betrian	57 kg	—N/a		Bye	Mesiano (ITA); W 3–2	Petrova (BUL); L 2–3	Did not advance	3rd place, bronze medalist(s)
Nouchka Fontijn	75 kg	—N/a		Bye	Sürmeneli (TUR); W 5–0	Wójcik (POL); W 3–2	Price (GBR); L 1–4	2nd place, silver medalist(s)

== Cycling ==
=== Road ===
Men

Athlete	Event	Time	Rank
Julius van den Berg	Road race	4:15:15	87
Joris Nieuwenhuis	Road race	4:10:45	6
Bram Welten	Road race	4:10:58	20
Dennis van Winden	Road race	4:10:58	67

Women

Athlete	Event	Time	Rank
Chantal Blaak	Road race	3:09:36	66
Chantal Blaak	Time trial	37:32	2nd place, silver medalist(s)
Anna van der Breggen	Road race	3:08:56	55
Amy Pieters	Road race	3:08:24	55
Marianne Vos	Road race	3:08:13	2nd place, silver medalist(s)
Lorena Wiebes	Road race	3:08:13	1st place, gold medalist(s)

=== Track ===
Sprint

Athlete	Event	Qualification		1/32 finals	1/32 finals repechage	1/16 finals	1/16 finals repechage	1/8 finals	1/8 finals repechage	Quarterfinals	Semifinals	Final / BM	
Athlete	Event	Time	Rank	Opposition	Opposition	Opposition	Opposition	Opposition	Opposition	Opposition	Opposition	Opposition	Rank
Jeffrey Hoogland	Men's sprint	9.448	1 Q	Bye		Szalontay (HUN); W	Bye	Lendel (LTU); W	Bye	Baugé (FRA); W, W	Dmitriev (RUS); W, W	Lavreysen (NED); L, W, W	1st place, gold medalist(s)
Harrie Lavreysen	Men's sprint	9.628	2 Q	Bye		Zaitsau (BLR); W	Bye	Čechman (CZE); W	Bye	Lendel (LTU); W, W	Mateusz Rudyk (POL); W, W	Hoogland (NED); W, L, L	2nd place, silver medalist(s)
Shanne Braspennincx	Women's sprint	10.782	2 Q	Bye		Kaňkovská (CZE); W	Bye	Calvo (ESP); W	Bye	Starikova (UKR); L, W, W	Voynova (RUS); L, L	Shmeleva (RUS); W, L, L	4
Laurine van Riessen	Women's sprint	10.955	6	Tołomanow (POL); W	Bye	Calvo (ESP); W	Bye	Marozaitė (LTU); W	Bye	Voynova (RUS); L, L	Did not advance		

Team sprint

Athlete	Event	Qualification		First round		Final / BM	
Athlete	Event	Time	Rank	Opposition Time	Rank	Opposition Time	Rank
Nils van 't Hoenderdaal (Q); Harrie Lavreysen; Jeffrey Hoogland; Roy van den Berg	Men's team sprint	43.111	1 Q	Spain; W 42.342	1 QG	France; W 42.385	1st place, gold medalist(s)
Kyra Lamberink; Shanne Braspennincx; Hetty van de Wouw (Q)	Women's team sprint	33.852	4	France; W 33.460	4	Poland; W 33.317	3rd place, bronze medalist(s)

Keirin

Athlete	Event	First round	Repechage	Second round	Final
Athlete	Event	Rank	Rank	Rank	Rank
Harrie Lavreysen	Men's keirin	1	Bye	1	1st place, gold medalist(s)
Jeffrey Hoogland	Men's keirin	1	Bye	4	7
Shanne Braspennincx	Women's keirin	1	Bye	2	2nd place, silver medalist(s)
Laurine van Riessen	Women's keirin	1	Bye	6	11

Omnium

Athlete	Event	Scratch race		Tempo race		Elimination race		Points race		Total points	Rank
Athlete	Event	Rank	Points	Rank	Points	Rank	Points	Rank	Points	Total points	Rank
Jan-Willem van Schip	Men's omnium	3	36	2	38	1	40	1	64	178	1st place, gold medalist(s)
Kirsten Wild	Women's omnium	1	40	1	40	1	40	3	30	150	1st place, gold medalist(s)

Madison

Athlete	Event	Points	Rank
Jan-Willem van Schip; Yoeri Havik	Men's madison	41	2nd place, silver medalist(s)
Kirsten Wild; Amber van der Hulst	Women's madison	40	2nd place, silver medalist(s)

Time trial

Athlete	Event	Qualification		Final	
Athlete	Event	Time	Rank	Time	Rank
Roy van den Berg	Men's 1 km time trial	1:01.459	4 Q	1:01.587	6
Sam Ligtlee	Men's 1 km time trial	1:01.918	8 Q	1:01.501	4
Kyra Lamberink	Women's 500 m time trial	34.613	8	34.903	7
Steffie van der Peet	Women's 500 m time trial	34.929	10	Did not advance	

Endurance

Athlete	Event	Points	Rank
Jan-Willem van Schip	Men's points race	38	2nd place, silver medalist(s)
Roy Eefting	Men's scratch	—N/a	6
Kirsten Wild	Women's points race	19	5
Kirsten Wild	Women's scratch	—N/a	1st place, gold medalist(s)

== Gymnastics ==
=== Acrobatic ===
Mixed

Athlete	Event	Score	Rank
Fenne van Dijck; Stef van der Locht	Balance	27.710	4
Fenne van Dijck; Stef van der Locht	Dynamic	28.280	4
Fenne van Dijck; Stef van der Locht	All-around	28.940	4

Women

Athlete	Event	Score	Rank
Lynn de Bock; Fem van Oss; Lotte van Vugt	Balance	26.730	6
Lynn de Bock; Fem van Oss; Lotte van Vugt	Dynamic	26.940	7
Lynn de Bock; Fem van Oss; Lotte van Vugt	All-around	27.220	7

=== Artistic ===
Women

Athlete	Event	Apparatus				Total	Rank
Athlete	Event	V	UB	BB	F	Total	Rank
Naomi Visser	Qualification	13.366	14.100 Q	11.400	12.666 R	51.532	10 Q
Naomi Visser	All-around	14.333	12.266	13.066	12.933	51.698	7
Naomi Visser	Uneven bars	—N/a	13.466	—N/a		13.466	5
Laura de Witt	Qualification	13.400	12.800	8.800	10.033	45.033	30

=== Trampoline ===
Athlete	Event	Qualification		Final	
Athlete	Event	Total	Rank	Score	Rank
Romee Pol	Women's individual	99.095	6 Q	53.860	5
Niamh Slattery	Women's individual	51.170	22	Did not advance	
Romee Pol; Niamh Slattery	Women's synchronized	—N/a		47.200	5

== Judo ==
Men

Athlete	Event	Round of 64	Round of 32	Round of 16	Quarterfinals	Semifinals	Repechage	Final / BM	
Athlete	Event	Opposition Result	Opposition Result	Opposition Result	Opposition Result	Opposition Result	Opposition Result	Opposition Result	Rank
Roy Koffijberg	−60 kg	—N/a	Özlü (TUR); W 10–00	Garrigós (ESP); L 00–10	Did not advance				
Tornike Tsjakadoea	−60 kg	—N/a	Bye	Huseynov (AZE); W 10–00	Chkhvimiani (GEO); L 00–10	Did not advance	Papinashvili (GEO); L 01–10	Did not advance	7
Frank de Wit	−81 kg	Bye	Cavelius (GER); W 01–00	Stępień (POL); W 10–00	Ungvári (HUN); L 00–10	Did not advance	Esposito (ITA); L 00–01	Did not advance	7
Noël van 't End	−90 kg	Bye	Kukovica (SVK); W 10–00	Clerget (FRA); W 10–00	Chamberlain (GBR); W 10–00	Kochman (ISR); L 00–10	Bye	Mehdiyev (AZE); L 00–10	5
Jesper Smink	−90 kg	Bye	Özerler (TUR); L 00–10	Did not advance					
Noël van 't End	−100 kg	—N/a	Bye	Mukete (BLR); L 00–01	Did not advance				
Henk Grol	+100 kg	—N/a	Bye	Ćulum (SRB); W 10–00	Hegyi (AUT); W 10–00	Tushishvili (GEO); L 01–10	Bye	Krpálek (CZE); W 11–00	3rd place, bronze medalist(s)
Roy Meyer	+100 kg	—N/a	Bye	Allerstorfer (AUT); W 10–00	Kokauri (AZE); L 00–10	Did not advance	Krpálek (CZE); L 00–10	Did not advance	7

Women

Athlete	Event	Round of 32	Round of 16	Quarterfinals	Semifinals	Repechage	Final / BM	
Athlete	Event	Opposition Result	Opposition Result	Opposition Result	Opposition Result	Opposition Result	Opposition Result	Rank
Margriet Bergstra	−57 kg	Monteiro (POR); L 01–10	Did not advance					
Sanne Verhagen	−57 kg	Skora (UKR); W 11–00	Nelson-Levy (ISR); W 01–00	Mezhetskaia (RUS); W 00–10	Did not advance	Equísoain (ESP); W 10–00	Monteiro (POR); L 00–01	5
Juul Franssen	−63 kg	Bye	Centracchio (ITA); L 00–10	Did not advance				
Sanne Vermeer	−63 kg	Bye	Gwend (ITA); W 01–00	Davydova (RUS); W 10–00	Agbegnenou (FRA); L 00–10	Bye	Trajdos (GER); W 01–00	3rd place, bronze medalist(s)
Sanne van Dijke	−70 kg	Prokopenko (RUS); W 10–00	Obradović (SRB); W 10–01	Fletcher (IRL); W 11–00	Gahié (FRA); W 01–00	Bye	Pinot (FRA); W 00–10	2nd place, silver medalist(s)
Kim Polling	−70 kg	Vargas Koch (GER); W 11–00	Bernholm (SWE); L 10–00	Did not advance				
Guusje Steenhuis	−78 kg	Bye	Turchyn (UKR) w/o	Kuka (KOS); W 11-00	Verkerk (NED); W 10-00	Bye	Apotekar (SLO); L 00-01	2nd place, silver medalist(s)
Marhinde Verkerk	−78 kg	Bye	Babintseva (RUS); W 11-01	Wagner (GER); W 11-00	Steenhuis (NED); L 11-00	Bye	Malonga (FRA); L 00-10	5

Mixed event

Athlete	Event	Round of 16	Quarterfinals	Semifinals	Repechage	Final / BM	
Athlete	Event	Opposition Result	Opposition Result	Opposition Result	Opposition Result	Opposition Result	Rank
Dutch Judo Team	Mixed team	Romania; W 4-1	Slovenia; W 4-1	Portugal; L 2-4	Bye	Austria; L 2-4	5

== Karate ==
Kumite
Men

Athlete	Event	Group stage				Semifinal	Final	
Athlete	Event	Opposition Score	Opposition Score	Opposition Score	Rank	Opposition Score	Opposition Score	Rank
Tyron Lardy	+84 kg	Gurbanli (AZE); L 0−2	Yamanoğlu (TUR); L 2−4	Horne (GER); D 0−9	4	Did not advance		

== Sambo ==
Key:

- ML – Minimal advantage by last technical evaluation
- MT – Minimal advantage by technical points
- VH – Total victory – painful hold
- VO – Victory by technical points – the loser without technical points
- VP – Victory by technical points – the loser with technical points
- VS – Total victory by decisive superiority
- VT – Total victory – total throw

Women

Athlete	Event	Quarterfinals	Semifinals	Repechage	Final / BM	
Athlete	Event	Opposition Result	Opposition Result	Opposition Result	Opposition Result	Rank
Sacha Gorissen	−80 kg	Kusanova (RUS); L 0−1^{VH}	Did not advance	Leonidze (GEO); L 0−1	Did not advance	7

== Shooting ==
Men

Athlete	Event	Qualification		Final	
Athlete	Event	Points	Rank	Points	Rank
Peter Hellenbrand	10 m air rifle	627.8	7 Q	123.5	8

Women

Athlete	Event	Qualification		Final	
Athlete	Event	Points	Rank	Points	Rank
Mandy Mulder	10 m air rifle	620.9	33	Did not advance	
Mandy Mulder	50 m rifle 3 positions	1128	39	Did not advance	
Esmee van der Veen	Skeet	110	15	Did not advance	

Mixed team

Athlete	Event	Qualification				Final / BM	
Athlete	Event	Stage 1		Stage 2		Final / BM	
Athlete	Event	Points	Rank	Points	Rank	Opposition Result	Rank
Mandy Mulder; Peter Hellenbrand	10 m air rifle	627.0	3 Q	414.4	5	Did not advance	

== Table tennis ==
Athlete	Event	Round 1	Round 2	Round 3	Round of 16	Quarterfinals	Semifinals	Final / BM	
Athlete	Event	Opposition Result	Opposition Result	Opposition Result	Opposition Result	Opposition Result	Opposition Result	Opposition Result	Rank
Ewout Oostwouder	Men's singles	Karabaxhak (KOS); W 4–0	Wang (SVK); L 0-4	Did not advance					
Laurens Tromer	Men's singles	Bye	Dyjas (POL); L 3-4	Did not advance					
Britt Eerland	Women's singles	Bye		Haponova (UKR); L 1-4	Did not advance				
Li Jie	Women's singles	Bye		Loeuillette (FRA); W 4-0	Shao (POR); W 4-3	Han (GER); L 1-4	Did not advance		
Britt Eerland; Kim Vermaas; Li Jie	Women's team	—N/a			Germany; L 1–3	Did not advance			
Britt Eerland; Laurens Tromer	Mixed doubles	—N/a			Stoyanov; Piccolin (ITA); L 2–3	Did not advance			

== Wrestling ==
Key:

- VFA – Victory by fall
- VFO – Victory by forfeit
- VIN – Victory by injury
- VPO – Victory by points – the loser without technical points
- VPO1 – Victory by points – the loser with technical points
- VSU – Victory by technical superiority – the loser without technical points and a margin of victory of at least 8 (Greco-Roman) or 10 (freestyle) points
- VSU1 – Victory by technical superiority – the loser with technical points and a margin of victory of at least 8 (Greco-Roman) or 10 (freestyle) points

Women's freestyle

Athlete	Event	Round of 16	Quarterfinals	Semifinals	Repechage	Final / BM	
Athlete	Event	Opposition Result	Opposition Result	Opposition Result	Opposition Result	Opposition Result	Rank
Jessica Blaszka	−53 kg	Kaladzinskaya (BLR); L 6−14	Did not advance				
