= Belarus at the 2019 European Games =

- IOC code: BLR
- NOC: Belarus Olympic Committee
- Website: www.noc.by

in Minsk, Belarus 21 – 30 June 2019
- Competitors: 221 in 15 sports
- Flag bearer: Vladimir Samsonov (table tennis)
- Medals Ranked 2nd: Gold 23 Silver 16 Bronze 29 Total 68

European Games appearances (overview)
- 2015; 2019; 2023; 2027

Belarus competed at the 2019 European Games, in Minsk, Belarus from 21 to 30 June 2019. Belarus had previously competed at the 2015 European Games in Baku, Azerbaijan, where it won 43 medals, including 10 golds. As host nation, Belarus automatically received a number in quota places in each sport, regardless of how they fared in the qualification.

== Medalists ==
Medal	Name	Sport	Event	Date
Gold	Maksim Nedasekau	Athletics	Men's high jump	
Gold	Elvira Herman	Athletics	Women's 100m hurdles	
Gold	Tatsiana Khaladovich	Athletics	Women's javelin throw	
Gold	Dzmitry Asanau	Boxing	Men's 60 kg	29 June
Gold	Artsem Kozyr	Canoe sprint	Men's C-1 200 metres	27 June
Gold	Alena Nazdrova	Canoe sprint	Women's C-1 200 metres	27 June
Gold	Volha Khudzenka	Canoe sprint	Women's K-1 500 metres	27 June
Gold	Maryna Litvinchuk	Canoe sprint	Women's K-1 5000 metres	27 June
Gold	Volha Khudzenka; Maryna Litvinchuk	Canoe sprint	Women's K-2 500 metres	25 June
Gold	Vasil Kiryienka	Cycling	Men's road time trial	25 June
Gold	Tatsiana Sharakova	Cycling	Women's individual pursuit	30 June
Gold	Maryna Slutskaya	Judo	Women's +78 kg	24 June
Gold	Hanna Haidukevich; Anastasiya Rybakova; Hanna Shvaiba; Arina Tsitsilina; Karyna Yarmolenka	Gymnastics	Women's rhythmic group all-around	23 June
Gold	Hanna Haidukevich; Anastasiya Rybakova; Hanna Shvaiba; Arina Tsitsilina; Karyna Yarmolenka	Gymnastics	Women's rhythmic group 3 hoops and 4 clubs	23 June
Gold	Julia Ivonchyk; Veranika Nabokina; Karina Sandovich	Gymnastics	Women's acrobatic groups balance	
Gold	Julia Ivonchyk; Veranika Nabokina; Karina Sandovich	Gymnastics	Women's acrobatic groups balance	
Gold	Uladzislau Hancharou	Gymnastics	Men's trampoline	25 June
Gold	Hanna Hancharova; Maria Makharynskaya	Gymnastics	Women's synchronized trampoline	25 June
Gold	Aliaksandr Koksha	Sambo	Men's -68 kg	22 June
Gold	Vera Harelikava	Sambo	Women's -60 kg	23 June
Gold	Anzhela Zhylinskaya	Sambo	Women's -72 kg	22 June
Silver	Marina Arzamasova; Daryia Barysevich; Stanislau Darahakupets; Elvira Herman; Maksim Hrabarenka; Siarhei Karpau; Yuliya Kastsiuchkova; Tatsiana Khaladovich; Aliaksei Lazarau; Marina Mikhan; Nastassia Mironchyk-Ivanova; Krystsina Muliarchyk; Maksim Nedasekau; Vitali Parakhonka; Andrei Skabeika; Yan Sloma; Krystsina Tsimanouskaya; Aliaksandr Vasileuski; Ihar Zubko; Ruslana Rashkavan; Viyaleta Skvartsova	Athletics	Team event	
Silver	Vital Parakhonka	Athletics	Men's 110m hurdles	
Silver	Krystsina Tsimanouskaya	Athletics	Women's 100 metres	
Silver	Karyna Dziominskaya; Karyna Kazlouskaya; Hanna Marusava	Archery	Women's team recurve	22 June
Silver	Uladzislau Smiahlikau	Boxing	Men's 91 kg	30 June
Silver	Nadzeya Makarchanka; Volha Klimava	Canoe sprint	Women's C-2 500 metres	27 June
Silver	Anna Kárász; Danuta Kozák; Tamara Csipes; Erika Medveczky	Canoe sprint	Women's K-2 200 metres	27 June
Silver	Katsiaryna Halkina	Gymnastics	Women's rhythmic individual hoop	23 June
Silver	Andrei Kazusionak	Sambo	Men's -90 kg	23 June
Silver	Yury Rybak	Sambo	Men's +100 kg	23 June
Silver	Maryna Zharskaya	Sambo	Women's -52 kg	23 June
Silver	Anastasiia Arkhipava	Sambo	Women's -56 kg	22 June
Silver	Yury Shcherbatsevich	Shooting	Men's 50 m rifle three positions	26 June
Bronze	Maxim Liutych; Mikita Meshcharakou; Andrei Rahozenka; Siarhei Vabishchevich	Basketball	Men's	24 June
Bronze	Natallia Dashkevich; Maryna Ivashchanka; Darya Mahalias; Anastasiya Sushczyk	Basketball	Women's	24 June
Bronze	Dzmitry Tratsiakou	Canoe sprint	Men's K-1 200 metres	27 June
Bronze	Aleh Yurenia	Canoe sprint	Men's K-1 1000 metres	26 June
Bronze	Volha Khudzenka; Maryna Litvinchuk	Canoe sprint	Women's K-2 200 metres	27 June
Bronze	Tatsiana Sharakova	Cycling	Women's road race	22 June
Bronze	Yauheni Karaliok	Cycling	Men's scratch	27 June
Bronze	Hanna Tserakh	Cycling	Women's scratch	28 June
Bronze	Artsiom Krautsou	Karate	Men's kumite 67 kg	30 June
Bronze	Mariya Koulinkovitch	Karate	Women's kumite 50 kg	30 June
Bronze	Katsiaryna Halkina	Gymnastics	Women's rhythmic individual all-around	22 June
Bronze	Hanna Haidukevich; Anastasiya Rybakova; Hanna Shvaiba; Arina Tsitsilina; Karyna Yarmolenka	Gymnastics	Women's rhythmic group 5 balls	23 June
Bronze	Andrey Likhovitskiy	Gymnastics	Men's pommel horse	30 June
Bronze	Anastasiya Alistratava	Gymnastics	Women's uneven bars	30 June
Bronze	Julia Ivonchyk; Veranika Nabokina; Karina Sandovich	Gymnastics	Women's acrobatic groups all-around	
Bronze	Julia Ivonchyk; Veranika Nabokina; Karina Sandovich	Gymnastics	Women's acrobatic groups dynamic	
Bronze	Artur Beliakou; Volha Melnik	Gymnastics	Mixed acrobatics pairs all-around	
Bronze	Artur Beliakou; Volha Melnik	Gymnastics	Mixed acrobatics pairs dynamic	
Bronze	Hanna Hancharova	Gymnastics	Women's trampoline	24 June
Bronze	Uladzislau Burdz	Sambo	Men's -57 kg	22 June
Bronze	Ivan Aniskevich	Sambo	Men's -62 kg	23 June
Bronze	Stsiapan Papou	Sambo	Men's -74 kg	23 June
Bronze	Tsimafei Yemelyanau	Sambo	Men's -82 kg	22 June
Bronze	Tsvetelina Tsvetanova	Sambo	Women's -48 kg	22 June
Bronze	Tatsiana Matsko	Sambo	Women's -64 kg	22 June
Bronze	Volha Namazava	Sambo	Women's -68 kg	23 June
Bronze	Volha Tsimashenka	Sambo	Women's -80 kg	23 June

Medals by sport
Sport	1st place, gold medalist(s)	2nd place, silver medalist(s)	3rd place, bronze medalist(s)	Total
Gymnastics	6	1	9	16
Canoe sprint	5	2	3	10
Sambo	3	4	8	15
Athletics	3	3	0	6
Cycling	2	0	3	5
Boxing	1	1	0	2
Judo	1	0	0	1
Archery	0	1	0	1
Shooting	0	1	0	1
Basketball	0	0	2	2
Karate	0	0	2	2
Total	21	13	27	61

== Archery ==
Recurve

Athlete	Event	Ranking round		Round of 64	Round of 32	Round of 16	Quarterfinals	Semifinals	Final / BM	
Athlete	Event	Score	Seed	Opposition Score	Opposition Score	Opposition Score	Opposition Score	Opposition Score	Opposition Score	Rank
Kirul Firsau	Men's individual	650	21	Bružis (LAT); W 7-1	Valladont (FRA); L 2-6	Did not advance				
Pavel Dalidovich	Men's individual	644	31	Shanny (ISR); W 6-2	Plihon (FRA); W 6-2	Castro (ESP); W 6-2	Wijler (NED); L 1-7	Did not advance		
Aliaksandr Liahusheu	Men's individual	636	38	Baldanov (RUS); W 6-2	Acha (ESP); L 0-6	Did not advance				
Karyna Kazlouskaya	Women's individual	654	3	Bye	Kovačić (CRO); W 6-0	Folkard (GBR); W 6-2	Boari (ITA); L 2-6	Did not advance		
Karyna Dziominskaya	Women's individual	648	8	Bye	Aktuna (TUR); W 6-4	Pavlova (UKR); W 6-0	Bayardo (NED); L 5-6	Did not advance		
Hanna Marusava	Women's individual	628	21	Kourouna (CYP); W 6-2	Andreoli (ITA); L 5-6	Did not advance				
Kiryl Firsau; Pavel Dalidovich; Aliaksandr Liahusheu	Men's team	1930	7	—N/a			Netherlands; L 0–6	Did not advance		5
Karyna Kazlouskaya; Karyna Dziominskaya; Hanna Marusava	Women's team	1930	2	—N/a			Ukraine; W 5–3	Germany; W 6–0	Great Britain; L 2–6	2nd place, silver medalist(s)
Kiryl Firsau; Karyna Kazlouyuskaya	Mixed team	1304	8	—N/a	Bye	Moldova; W 6–2	Netherlands; W 5–3	Italy; L 2–6	Germany; L 2–6	4

Compound

Athlete	Event	Ranking round		Round of 16	Quarterfinals	Semifinals	Final / BM	
Athlete	Event	Score	Seed	Opposition Score	Opposition Score	Opposition Score	Opposition Score	Rank
Maksim Ban	Men's individual	693	9	Ravenscroft (GBR); L 140–144	Did not advance			
Alena Kuzniatsova	Women's individual	677	14	Dodemont (FRA); L 142–143	Did not advance			9
Maksim Ban; Alena Kuzniatsova	Mixed team	1370	8	Germany; L 146–155	Did not advance			9

== Badminton ==
Athletes	Event	Group stage				Round of 16	Quarterfinals	Semifinals	Final	Rank
Athletes	Event	Opposition Score	Opposition Score	Opposition Score	Rank	Opposition Score	Opposition Score	Opposition Score	Opposition Score	Rank
Alesia Zaitsava	Women's singles	Christodoulou (CYP); W 2–0	Tan (BEL); L 0–2	Kosetskaya (RUS); L 0	3	Did not advance				
Anastasiya Cherniavskaya	Women's singles	~~Corrales (ESP)~~; ~~L 0–2~~	de Visch Eijbergen (NED); L 0–2	Pavlinić (CRO); L 0–2	3	Did not advance				
Anastasiya Cherniavskaya; Alesia Zaitsava	Women's doubles	Jaques / Vandenhoucke (BEL); L 0–2	Marran / Rüütel (EST); L 0–2	Lefel / Tran (FRA); L 0–2	4	—N/a	Did not advance			
Aleksei Konakh; Kristina Silich	Mixed doubles	Gicquel / Delrue (FRA); L 0–2	Dremin / Dimova (RUS); L 0–2	Magee / Magee (IRL); L 0–2	4	—N/a	Did not advance			

== Basketball 3x3 ==
Team roster

Men

- Maxim Liutych
- Mikita Meshcharakou
- Andrei Rahozenka
- Siarhei Vabishchevich

Women

- Natallia Dashkevich
- Maryna Ivashchanka
- Darya Mahalias
- Anastasiya Sushczyk

Summary

Team	Event	Group stage				Quarterfinals	Semifinals	Final / BM	
Team	Event	Opposition Score	Opposition Score	Opposition Score	Rank	Opposition Score	Opposition Score	Opposition Score	Rank
Belarus men's	Men's tournament	Lithuania; L 13–19	Estonia; W 21–14	Slovenia; W 15–10	2 Q	Serbia; W 19–10	Latvia; L 17–19	Poland; W 21–15	3rd place, bronze medalist(s)
Belarus women's	Women's tournament	Russia; W 21–16	Serbia; L 15–21	Italy; W 21–7	1 Q	Netherlands; W 15–11	Estonia; L 14–15	Germany; W 21–16	3rd place, bronze medalist(s)

== Beach soccer ==
Summary

Team	Event	Group stage				Semifinals	Final / BM	
Team	Event	Opposition Score	Opposition Score	Opposition Score	Rank	Opposition Score	Opposition Score	Rank
Belarus men's	Men's tournament	Romania; L 1–6	Switzerland; W 5*–5	Portugal; L 3–7	3	Did not advance		

== Boxing ==
Men

Athlete	Event	Round of 64	Round of 32	Round of 16	Quarterfinals	Semifinals	Final	
Athlete	Event	Opposition Result	Opposition Result	Opposition Result	Opposition Result	Opposition Result	Opposition Result	Rank
Yauheni Karmilchyk	49 kg	—N/a		Hovhannisyan (ARM); L 0–5	Did not advance			
Emil Aliyeu	52 kg	—N/a	Bye	Harutyunyan (ARM); L 1–4	Did not advance			
Nikalai Shakh	56 kg	—N/a	Bye	Rahimić (BIH); W 5–0	Butsenko (UKR); L 0-5	Did not advance		
Dzmitry Asanau	60 kg	—N/a	Tankó (SVK); W 5–0	Černoga (SLO); W RSC	Shestak (UKR); W 4-1	Tonakanyan (ARM); W 4-1	Mamedov (RUS); W 4-1	1st place, gold medalist(s)
Vazgen Safaryants	64 kg	—N/a	Karhanin (EST); W 3–2	Khartsyz (UKR); L 0–5	Did not advance			
Yauheni Dauhaliavets	69 kg	Bye	Kapuler (ISR); W RSC	Molloy (IRL); W 4-1	Barabanov (UKR); L 1–4	Did not advance		
Vadzim Pankou	75 kg	Bye	Kajoshi (ALB); W 4-1	Güler (TUR); L 0-5	Did not advance			
Mikhail Dauhaliavets	81 kg	—N/a	Bye	Alfonso (AZE); L 0-5	Did not advance			
Uladzislau Smiahlikau	91 kg	—N/a	Bye	Aliu (FIN); W 5-0	Begadze (GEO); W 3-2	Clarke (GBR); W 4-1	Gadzhimagomedov (RUS); L 5-0	2nd place, silver medalist(s)
Viktar Chvarkou	+91 kg	—N/a	Bye	Belberov (BUL); L 5-0	Did not advance			

Women

Athlete	Event	Round of 16	Quarterfinals	Semifinals	Final	
Athlete	Event	Opposition Result	Opposition Result	Opposition Result	Opposition Result	Rank
Volha Lushchyk	51 kg	Kob (UKR); L 0-4	Did not advance			
Helina Bruyevich	57 kg	Beram (CRO); W 5-0	Abramova (RUS); L 2-3	Did not advance		
Ala Yarshevich	60 kg	Tsyplakova (UKR); W 4-1	Potkonen (FIN); L 0-5	Did not advance		
Antanina Aksenava	69 kg	Koszewska (POL); L 0-5	Did not advance			
Viktoria Kebikava	75 kg	O'Rourke (IRL); L 1-4	Did not advance			

== Canoe sprint ==
Men

Athlete	Event	Heats		Semifinal		Final	
Athlete	Event	Time	Rank	Time	Rank	Time	Rank
Artsem Kozyr	C-1 200 m	40.636	4 QS	39.657	1 QF	42.835	1st place, gold medalist(s)
Maksim Piatrou	C-1 1000 m	3:51.446	2 QF	Bye		4:03.506	4
Andrei Bahdanovich; Vitali Asetski	C-2 1000 m	3:36.822	3 QF	Bye		3:46.762	7
Dzmitry Tratsiakou	K-1 200 m	5.229	3 QS	34.543	2 QF	39.351	3rd place, bronze medalist(s)
Aleh Yurenia	K-1 1000 m	3:31.591	2 QS	3:26.364	1 FA	3:32.291	3rd place, bronze medalist(s)
Aleh Yurenia	K-1 5000 m	—N/a				21:55.680	4
Vitaliy Bialko; Raman Piatrushenka	K-2 1000 m	3:10.280	3 QF	Bye		3:20.670	8
Aliaksei Misiuchenka; Stanislau Daineka; Uladzislau Litvinau; Dzmitry Natynchyk	K-4 500 m	1:18.496	1 QF	Bye		1:35.236	6

Women

Athlete	Event	Heats		Semifinal		Final	
Athlete	Event	Time	Rank	Time	Rank	Time	Rank
Alena Nazdrova	C-1 200 m	47.721	3 QF	Bye		50.351	1st place, gold medalist(s)
Nadzeya Makarchanka; Volha Klimava	C-2 500 m	1:58.125	2 QF	Bye		2:12.924	2nd place, silver medalist(s)
Marharyta Makhneva	K-1 200 m	41.609	3 QS	40.315	2 FA	43.878	8
Marharyta Makhneva	K-1 500 m	1:46.465	1 QF	Bye		2:03.929	1st place, gold medalist(s)
Maryna Litvinchuk	K-1 5000 m	—N/a				24:52.258	1st place, gold medalist(s)
Volha Khudzenka; Maryna Litvinchuk	K-2 200 m	37.883	1 QF	Bye		45.073	3rd place, bronze medalist(s)
Maryna Litvinchuk; Volha Khudzenka	K-2 500 m	1:37.971	2 QF	Bye		1:40.888	1st place, gold medalist(s)
Marharyta Makhneva; Nadzeya Papok; Volha Khudzenka; Maryna Litvinchuk	K-4 500 m	1:29.752	1 QF	Bye		1:41.654	2nd place, silver medalist(s)

== Cycling ==
=== Road ===
Men

Athlete	Event	Time	Rank
Vasil Kiryienka	Road race	4:10:54	15
Vasil Kiryienka	Time trial	33:03.34	1st place, gold medalist(s)
Alexandr Riabushenko	Road race	4:10:20	4
Branislau Samoilau	Road race	4:10:54	53
Branislau Samoilau	Time trial	35:22.84	15
Nikolai Shumov	Road race	4:10:54	51
Yauhen Sobal	Road race	4:10:54	52

Women

Athlete	Event	Time	Rank
Alena Amialiusik	Road race	3:08:13	15
Alena Amialiusik	Time trial	37:46.18	5
Tatsiana Sharakova	Road race	3:08:13	3rd place, bronze medalist(s)
Tatsiana Sharakova	Time trial	38:45.23	10
Anastasiya Kolesava	Road race	3:08:43	42
Taisa Naskovich	Road race	3:09:36	56
Hanna Tserakh	Road race	3:09:36	65

=== Track ===
Sprint

Athlete	Event	Qualification		1/32 finals	1/32 finals repechage	1/16 finals	1/16 finals repechage	1/8 finals	1/8 finals repechage	Quarterfinals	Semifinals	Final / BM	
Athlete	Event	Time	Rank	Opposition	Opposition	Opposition	Opposition	Opposition	Opposition	Opposition	Opposition	Opposition	Rank
Andrei Lukashevich	Men's sprint	10.240	20 q	Lendel (LTU); L	Szalontay (HUN); Chebanets (UKR); 2nd	Did not advance							
Artsiom Zaitsau	Men's sprint	10.217	19 q	Baugé (FRA); L	Omelchenko (AZE); Moreno (ESP); W	Lavreysen (NED); L	Yakushevskiy (RUS); L	Did not advance					
Dziyana Miadzvetskaya	Women's sprint	11.632	21 q	Shmeleva (RUS); L	Capewell (GBR); Fidanza (ITA); 3rd	Did not advance							

Team sprint

Athlete	Event	Qualification		First round		Final / BM	
Athlete	Event	Time	Rank	Opposition Time	Rank	Opposition Time	Rank
Aliaksandr Hlova; Artsiom Zaitsau; Uladzislau Novik	Men's team sprint	44.060	6	France; L 43.745	6	Did not advance	

Team pursuit

Athlete	Event	Qualification		First round		Final / BM	
Athlete	Event	Time	Rank	Opponent Time	Rank	Opponent Time	Rank
Raman Tsishkou; Yauheni Akhramenka; Yauheni Karaliok; Hardzei Tsishchanka	Men's team pursuit	3:59.048	3	Italy; L 3:57.899	4	Switzerland; L OVL	4
Polina Pivovarova; Aksana Salauyeva; Ina Savenka; Karalina Savenka	Women's team pursuit	4:29.469	4	Italy; L 4:26.842	4	Poland; L4:29.062	4

Keirin

Athlete	Event	First round	Repechage	Second round	Final
Athlete	Event	Rank	Rank	Rank	Rank
Artsiom Zaitsau	Men's keirin	5	3	Did not advance	
Uladzislau Novik	Men's keirin	3	3	Did not advance	
Dziyana Miadzvetskaya	Women's keirin	6	4	Did not advance	

Omnium

Athlete	Event	Scratch race		Tempo race		Elimination race		Points race		Total points	Rank
Athlete	Event	Rank	Points	Rank	Points	Rank	Points	Rank	Points	Total points	Rank
Raman Tsishkou	Men's omnium	7	28	4	34	5	32	9	9	103	7
Tatsiana Sharakova	Women's omnium	10	22	5	32	12	18	1	45	117	4

Madison

Athlete	Event	Points	Rank
Raman Tsishkou; Yauheni Karaliok	Men's madison	21	7
Polina Pivovarova; Hanna Tserakh	Women's madison	5	6

Time trial

Athlete	Event	Qualification		Final	
Athlete	Event	Time	Rank	Time	Rank
Andrei Lukashevich	Men's 1 km time trial	1:03.980	12	Did not advance	
Uladzislau Novik	Men's 1 km time trial	1:01.524	5 Q	1:01.512	5
Dziyana Miadzvetskaya	Women's 500 m time trial	35.932	14	Did not advance	

Individual pursuit

Athlete	Event	Qualification		Final / BM	
Athlete	Event	Time	Rank	Opponent Time	Rank
Yauheni Akhramenka	Men's individual pursuit	4:21.652	6	Did not advance	
Mikhail Shemetau	Men's individual pursuit	4:19.955	5	Did not advance	
Ina Savenka	Women's individual pursuit	3:40.556	8	Did not advance	
Tatsiana Sharakova	Women's individual pursuit	3:31.153	1	Cavalli (ITA); W 3:32.045	1st place, gold medalist(s)

Endurance

Athlete	Event	Points	Rank
Raman Ramanau	Men's points race	12	6
Yauheni Karaliok	Men's scratch	—N/a	3rd place, bronze medalist(s)
Ina Savenka	Women's points race	24	4
Hanna Tserakh	Women's scratch	—N/a	3rd place, bronze medalist(s)

== Gymnastics ==
=== Acrobatic ===
Mixed

Athlete	Event	Score	Rank
Artur Beliakou; Volha Nabokina	Balance	29.490	1st place, gold medalist(s)
Artur Beliakou; Volha Nabokina	Dynamic	28.810	3rd place, bronze medalist(s)
Artur Beliakou; Volha Nabokina	All-around	29.420	3rd place, bronze medalist(s)

Women

Athlete	Event	Score	Rank
Julia Ivonchyk; Veranika Nabokina; Karina Sandovich	Balance	29.520	1st place, gold medalist(s)
Julia Ivonchyk; Veranika Nabokina; Karina Sandovich	Dynamic	29.090	3rd place, bronze medalist(s)
Julia Ivonchyk; Veranika Nabokina; Karina Sandovich	All-around	29.060	3rd place, bronze medalist(s)

=== Aerobic ===
Mixed

Athletes	Event	Score	Rank
Dzmitry Zakharevich; Yuliya Valadar; Anastasiya Budzeika; Darya Kharaneka; Alesia Zavadskaya	Mixed groups	17.894	8
Dzmitry Zakharevich; Yuliya Valadar	Mixed pairs	17.850	7

=== Artistic ===
Men

Athlete	Event	Apparatus						Total	Rank
Athlete	Event	F	PH	R	V	PB	HB	Total	Rank
Andrey Likhovitskiy	Qualification	—N/a	14.500 Q	—N/a		14.500 R	14.000 Q	—N/a	
Andrey Likhovitskiy	Pommel horse	—N/a	14.566	—N/a				14.566	3rd place, bronze medalist(s)
Andrey Likhovitskiy	Horizontal bar	—N/a					13.833	13.833	4
Vasili Mikhalitsyn	Qualification	—N/a	13.533	—N/a					
Yahor Sharamkou	Qualification	14.466 Q	—N/a		14.166 R	—N/a			
Yahor Sharamkou	Floor	13.533	—N/a					13.533	5

Women

Athlete	Event	Apparatus				Total	Rank
Athlete	Event	V	UB	BB	F	Total	Rank
Anastasiya Alistratava	Qualification	12.600	14.166 Q	12.233 R	12.833 Q	51.832	7 Q
Anastasiya Alistratava	All-around	12.800	13.366	11.533	12.466	50.165	12
Anastasiya Alistratava	Uneven bars	—N/a	14.233	—N/a		14.233	3rd place, bronze medalist(s)
Anastasiya Alistratava	Floor	—N/a			12.900	12.900	4
Ganna Metelitsa	Qualification	12.466	12.566	10.700	11.366	47.098	25

=== Rhythmic ===
Individual

Athlete	Event	Final & Qualification					
Athlete	Event	Hoop	Ball	Clubs	Ribbon	Total	Rank
Katsiaryna Halkina	All-around	21.800 Q	17.900 Q	21.200 Q	18.400 Q	79.300	3rd place, bronze medalist(s)
Katsiaryna Halkina	Hoop	21.750	—N/a			21.750	2nd place, silver medalist(s)
Katsiaryna Halkina	Ball	—N/a	21.050	—N/a		21.050	4
Katsiaryna Halkina	Clubs	—N/a		20.750	—N/a	20.750	5
Katsiaryna Halkina	Ribbon	—N/a			19.400	19.400	4

Group

Athlete	Event	Total	Rank
Hanna Haidukevich; Anastasiya Rybakova; Hanna Shvaiba; Arina Tsitsilina; Karyna Yarmolenka	5 balls	26.150	3rd place, bronze medalist(s)
Hanna Haidukevich; Anastasiya Rybakova; Hanna Shvaiba; Arina Tsitsilina; Karyna Yarmolenka	3 hoops, 4 clubs	26.450	1st place, gold medalist(s)
Hanna Haidukevich; Anastasiya Rybakova; Hanna Shvaiba; Arina Tsitsilina; Karyna Yarmolenka	All-round	52.600	1st place, gold medalist(s)

=== Trampoline ===
Athlete	Event	Qualification		Final	
Athlete	Event	Total	Rank	Score	Rank
Uladzislau Hancharou	Men's individual	113.480	1 Q	60.045	1st place, gold medalist(s)
Aleh Rabtsau	Men's individual	110.455	4	Did not advance	
Uladzislau Hancharou; Aleh Rabtsau	Men's synchronized	—N/a		5.700	8
Hanna Hancharova	Women's individual	103.100	2 Q	53.970	2nd place, silver medalist(s)
Maria Makharynskaya	Women's individual	102.235	4	Did not advance	
Hanna Hancharova; Maria Makharynskaya	Women's synchronized	—N/a		50.230	1st place, gold medalist(s)

== Judo ==
Men

Athlete	Event	Round of 64	Round of 32	Round of 16	Quarterfinals	Semifinals	Repechage	Final / BM	
Athlete	Event	Opposition Result	Opposition Result	Opposition Result	Opposition Result	Opposition Result	Opposition Result	Opposition Result	Rank
Dzmitry Minkou	−66 kg	Bye	Petřikov (CZE); L 01–10	Did not advance					
Dzmitry Shershan	−66 kg	Bye	Klokov (LTU); W 01–00	Lombardo (ITA); W 10–00	Zantaraia (UKR); L 00–01	Did not advance	Vieru (MDA); L 00–10	Did not advance	7
Vadzim Shoka	−73 kg	Umayev (BEL); W 10–01	Gjakova (KOS); L 00–10	Did not advance					
Yahor Varapayeu	−90 kg	Žilka (SVK); W 01–00	Mehdiyev (AZE); L 00–10	Did not advance					
Daniel Mukete	−100 kg	—N/a	Loporchio (ITA); W 10–00	Korrel (NED); W 01–00	Kumrić (CRO); L 00–10	Did not advance	Nikiforov (BEL); W 10–01	Maret (FRA); L 00–01	5
Mikita Sviryd	−100 kg	—N/a	Baraniewski (POL); W 10–00	Liparteliani (GEO); L 00–10	Did not advance				
Uladzislau Tsiarpitski	+100 kg	—N/a	Sadiković (BIH); W 11–00	Tasoev (RUS); L 00–11	Did not advance				
Aliaksandr Vakhaviak	+100 kg	—N/a	Heinle (GER); L 00–10	Did not advance					

Women

Athlete	Event	Round of 32	Round of 16	Quarterfinals	Semifinals	Repechage	Final / BM	
Athlete	Event	Opposition Result	Opposition Result	Opposition Result	Opposition Result	Opposition Result	Opposition Result	Rank
Kseniya Danilovich	−52 kg	Rexhepi (MKD); W 11–00	Buchard (FRA); L 00–10	Did not advance				
Alesia Mlechko	−52 kg	Štangar (SLO); L 01–10	Did not advance					
Ulyana Minenkova	−57 kg	Gneto (FRA); L 01–11	Did not advance					
Zhanna Asipovich	−70 kg	Howell (GBR); L 00–11	Did not advance					
Viktoryia Novikava	−70 kg	Bellandi (FRA); L 00–101	Did not advance					
Maryna Slutskaya	+78 kg	Bye	Jablonskytė (LTU); W 10-00	Chibisova (RUS); W 10-00	Kindzerska (AZE); W 01-00	Bye	Cerić (BIH); W 10-00	1st place, gold medalist(s)

Mixed event

Athlete	Event	Round of 16	Quarterfinals	Semifinals	Repechage	Final / BM	
Athlete	Event	Opposition Result	Opposition Result	Opposition Result	Opposition Result	Opposition Result	Rank
Belarus Judo Team	Mixed team	Hungary; W 4-2	Austria; W 4-1	Russia; L 2-4	Bye	France; L 1-4	5

== Karate ==
=== Kata ===
Athlete	Event	Elimination round		Ranking Round		Final / BM	
Athlete	Event	Points	Rank	Points	Rank	Opposition Result	Rank
Aliaksei Tarashkevich	Men's	21.90	4	Did not advance			
Maryia Fursava	Women's	24.33	3	24.66	3	Esparteiro (POR); L 23.68-24.68	5

=== Kumite ===
Men

Athlete	Event	Group stage				Semifinal	Final	
Athlete	Event	Opposition Score	Opposition Score	Opposition Score	Rank	Opposition Score	Opposition Score	Rank
Ilya Bulatau	−60 kg	Farzaliyev (AZE); L 0-8	Crescenzo (ITA); L 0-8	Pavlov (MKD); L 0-5	4	Did not advance		
Artsiom Krautsou	−67 kg	Pokorny (AUT); D 0-0	Hasanov (AZE); W 5-1	Tadissi (AUT); D 0-0	1 Q	Hodžić (MNE); L 0-4	Did not advance	3rd place, bronze medalist(s)
Ivan Korabau	−75 kg	Bitsch (GER); L 0-4	Horuna (UKR); D 3-3	Artamonov (EST); L 0-3	4	Did not advance		
Anton Isakau	−84 kg	Abdesselem (FRA); W 2-0	Aktaş (TUR); L 1-0	Martina (ITA); L 2-3	3	Did not advance		
Aliaksei Vodchyts	+84 kg	Arkania (GEO); L 2-3	Kvesić (CRO); L 2-2	Bitević (SRB); D 0-0	4	Did not advance		

Women

Athlete	Event	Group stage				Semifinal	Final	
Athlete	Event	Opposition Score	Opposition Score	Opposition Score	Rank	Opposition Score	Opposition Score	Rank
Mariya Koulinkovitch	−50 kg	Hubrich (GER); W 3-0	Özçelik (TUR); L 0-6	Aliyeva (AZE); W 3-1	2 Q	Plank (AUT); L 0-0	Did not advance	3rd place, bronze medalist(s)
Irina Sharykhina	−55 kg	Banaszczyk (POL); L 1-4	Bitsch (GER); L 2-5	Warling (LUX); L 0-4	4	Did not advance		
Anastasiya Dzyachkova	−61 kg	Ristić (SLO); L 0-2	Çoban (TUR); D 3-3	Ferrer (ESP); D 0-0	4	Did not advance		
Maryia Aliakseyeva	−68 kg	Quirici (SUI); L 0-4	Melnyk (UKR); L 1-4	Pedersen (DEN); W 2-1	3	Did not advance		
Katsiaryna Martynouskaya	+68 kg	Palacio (ESP); L 2-3	Hocaoğlu (TUR); L 0-6	Garcia (FRA); W 2-1	3	Did not advance		

== Sambo ==
Key:

- ML – Minimal advantage by last technical evaluation
- MT – Minimal advantage by technical points
- VH – Total victory – painful hold
- VO – Victory by technical points – the loser without technical points
- VP – Victory by technical points – the loser with technical points
- VS – Total victory by decisive superiority
- VT – Total victory – total throw

Men

Athlete	Event	Quarterfinals	Semifinals	Repechage	Final / BM	
Athlete	Event	Opposition Result	Opposition Result	Opposition Result	Opposition Result	Rank
Maksim Krasinski	−52 kg	Rîmă (ROU); W 3−3	Samadov (AZE); L 0-4^{VH}	Bye	Nadareishvili (GEO); L 1-10^{VS}	5
Uladzislau Burdz	−57 kg	Khalilov (AZE); W 4−1	Chidrashvili (GEO); L 0-3	Bye	Celik (TUR); W 6-0	3rd place, bronze medalist(s)
Ivan Aniskevich	−62 kg	Fomin (EST); W 10−3^{VS}	Karakizidis (GRE); L 0-0^{VH}	Bye	Yevdoshenko (UKR); W 2-1	3rd place, bronze medalist(s)
Aliaksandr Koksha	−68 kg	Bogdanov (MKD); W 12−0^{VH}	Galbiati (ITA); W 1-0	Bye	Liluashvili (GEO); W 5-0	1st place, gold medalist(s)
Stsiapan Papou	−74 kg	Nakhutsrishvili (GEO); L 1-2	Did not advance	Martirosyan (BUL); W 1-0	Sumpor (CRO); W 2-1^{VH}	3rd place, bronze medalist(s)
Tsimafei Yemelyanau	−82 kg	Oslobanu (MDA); W 1-0	Perepelyuk (RUS); L 0-0^{VT}	Bye	Miceli (ITA); W 0-0	3rd place, bronze medalist(s)
Andrei Kazusenok	−90 kg	Gviniashvili (GEO); W 8-0^{VS}	Gerasimenko (SRB); W 3-0	Bye	Ryabov (RUS); L 1-3	2nd place, silver medalist(s)
Aliaksei Stsepankou	−100 kg	Boloban (UKR); L 1-9^{VS}	Did not advance	Chernoskulov (UKR); L 0-1	Did not advance	7
Yury Rybak	+100 kg	Fernández (ESP); W 8-0^{VS}	Bondarenko (UKR); W 7-1	Bye	Berdzenishvili (GEO); L 0-8^{VS}	2nd place, silver medalist(s)

Women

Athlete	Event	Quarterfinals	Semifinals	Repechage	Final / BM	
Athlete	Event	Opposition Result	Opposition Result	Opposition Result	Opposition Result	Rank
Anfisa Kapayeva	−48 kg	Chiss (ROU); L 0−1^{VQ}	Did not advance	Wojciak (FRA); W 1-0	Lalazaryan (ARM); W 1-0^{VH}	3rd place, bronze medalist(s)
Maryna Zharskaya	−52 kg	Eșanu (MDA); W 1−0	Díaz (ESP); W 1−1	Bye	Ryabova (RUS); L 0−0^{VH}	2nd place, silver medalist(s)
Anastasiia Arkhipava	−56 kg	Poroineanu (ROU); W 1−0	Fournier (FRA); W 1−0	Bye	Kazeniuk (RUS); L 0−0^{VS}	2nd place, silver medalist(s)
Vera Harelikava	−60 kg	Ionescu (ROU); W 1−0^{VH}	Kostenko (RUS); W 3−2	Bye	Artemciuc (MDA); W 1−0^{VH}	1st place, gold medalist(s)
Tatsiana Matsko	−64 kg	Onoprienko (RUS); L 0−8^{VS}	Did not advance	Skorda (GRE); W 0−0^{VI}	Perin (ITA); W 10−0^{VS}	3rd place, bronze medalist(s)
Volha Namazava	−68 kg	Babić (CRO); L 0−3	Did not advance	Jarkowsk (POL); W 1−1	Jandrić (SRB); W 1−1	3rd place, bronze medalist(s)
Anzhela Zhylinskaya	−72 kg	Bolohan (MDA); W 2−0	Smal (UKR); W 2−0	Bye	Nino Odzelashvili (GEO); W 0−2^{VI}	1st place, gold medalist(s)
Sviatlana Tsimashenka	−80 kg	Oryashkova (BUL); L 2−3	Did not advance	Masy (BEL); W 1−10^{VS}	Nino Odzelashvili (GEO); W 0−2^{VI}	3rd place, bronze medalist(s)
Katsiarina Kaliuzhnaya	=80 kg	Păunescu (FRA); W 4−0^{VH}	Sapsai (UKR); L 0-5	Did not advance	Balashova (RUS); L 0−1^{VH}	5

== Shooting ==
Men

Athlete	Event	Qualification		Final	
Athlete	Event	Points	Rank	Points	Rank
Illia Charheika	10 m air rifle	626.1	13	Did not advance	
Vitali Bubnovich	10 m air rifle	619.5	34	Did not advance	
Yury Shcherbatsevich	50 m rifle three positions	1178	3	460.9	2nd place, silver medalist(s)
Vitali Bubnovich	50 m rifle three positions	1168	17	Did not advance	
Abdul-Aziz Kurdzi	10 m air pistol	574	18	Did not advance	
Yauheni Zaichyk	10 m air pistol	568	28	Did not advance	
Andrei Gerachtchenko	Skeet	101	29	Did not advance	

Women

Athlete	Event	Qualification		Final	
Athlete	Event	Points	Rank	Points	Rank
Katsiaryna Kruchanok	10 m air pistol	575	5	112.2	8
Viktoria Chaika	10 m air pistol	571	13	Did not advance	
Katsiaryna Kruchanok	25 m air pistol	282	27	Did not advance	
Viktoria Chaika	25 m air pistol	291	21	Did not advance	
Maria Martynova	10 m air rifle	627	4	163.2	6
Sviatlana Shcherbatsevich	10 m air rifle	619.8	36	Did not advance	
Maria Martynova	50 m rifle three positions	1158	15	Did not advance	
Sviatlana Shcherbatsevich	50 m rifle three positions	1144	36	Did not advance	
