= Cycling at the 2019 European Games – Women's 500 m time trial =

Women's 500 m time trial at the 2019 European Games
- Venue: Minsk Velodrome
- Date: 30 June
- Competitors: 14 from 9 nations
- Winning time: 33.209

Medalists
gold medal	Daria Shmeleva	Russia
silver medal	Olena Starikova	Ukraine
bronze medal	Miriam Vece	Italy

The women's 500 m time trial competition at the 2019 European Games was held at the Minsk Velodrome on 30 June 2019.

== Results ==
=== Qualifying ===
The top 8 riders qualified for the final.

Rank	Name	Nation	Time	Behind	Notes
1	Daria Shmeleva	Russia	33.395		Q
2	Natalia Antonova	Russia	34.065	+0.670	Q
3	Olena Starikova	Ukraine	34.083	+0.688	Q
4	Miriam Vece	Italy	34.246	+0.851	Q
5	Tania Calvo	Spain	34.426	+1.031	Q
6	Miglė Marozaitė	Lithuania	34.433	+1.038	Q
7	Sandie Clair	France	34.509	+1.114	Q
8	Kyra Lamberink	Netherlands	34.613	+1.218	Q
9	Helena Casas	Spain	34.828	+1.433	
10	Steffie van der Peet	Netherlands	34.929	+1.534	
11	Julita Jagodzińska	Poland	35.052	+1.657	
12	Nikola Sibiak	Poland	35.366	+1.971	
13	Lyubov Basova	Ukraine	35.490	+2.095	
14	Dziyana Miadzvetskaya	Belarus	35.932	+2.537	

=== Final ===
Rank	Name	Nation	Time	Behind	Notes
1st place, gold medalist(s)	Daria Shmeleva	Russia	33.209		
2nd place, silver medalist(s)	Olena Starikova	Ukraine	33.389	+0.180	
3rd place, bronze medalist(s)	Miriam Vece	Italy	34.151	+0.942	
4	Natalia Antonova	Russia	34.185	+0.976	
5	Miglė Marozaitė	Lithuania	34.505	+1.296	
6	Tania Calvo	Spain	34.506	+1.297	
7	Kyra Lamberink	Netherlands	34.903	+1.694	
8	Sandie Clair	France	34.926	+1.717	
