= Cycling at the 2019 European Games – Men's sprint =

Men's sprint at the 2019 European Games
- Venue: Minsk Velodrome
- Date: 28–29 June
- Competitors: 22 from 13 nations

Medalists
| gold medal | Jeffrey Hoogland | Netherlands |
| silver medal | Harrie Lavreysen | Netherlands |
| bronze medal | Denis Dmitriev | Russia |

The men's cycling sprint at the 2019 European Games was held at the Minsk Velodrome on 28 and 29 June 2019.

== Results ==
=== Qualifying ===
The top two riders advanced directly to the 1/16 finals; others advanced to the 1/32 finals.

| Rank | Name | Nation | Time | Behind | Notes |
|---|---|---|---|---|---|
| 1 | Jeffrey Hoogland | Netherlands | 9.448 | | Q |
| 2 | Harrie Lavreysen | Netherlands | 9.628 | +0.180 | Q |
| 3 | Mateusz Rudyk | Poland | 9.700 | +0.252 | q |
| 4 | Denis Dmitriev | Russia | 9.770 | +0.322 | q |
| 5 | Vasilijus Lendel | Lithuania | 9.787 | +0.339 | q |
| 6 | Grégory Baugé | France | 9.807 | +0.359 | q |
| 7 | Pavel Yakushevskiy | Russia | 9.836 | +0.388 | q |
| 8 | Jason Kenny | Great Britain | 9.837 | +0.389 | q |
| 9 | Pavel Kelemen | Czech Republic | 9.846 | +0.398 | q |
| 10 | Quentin Caleyron | France | 9.847 | +0.399 | q |
| 11 | Martin Čechman | Czech Republic | 9.897 | +0.449 | q |
| 12 | Jack Carlin | Great Britain | 9.933 | +0.485 | q |
| 13 | Sándor Szalontay | Hungary | 9.952 | +0.504 | q |
| 14 | José Moreno | Spain | 10.040 | +0.592 | q |
| 15 | Juan Peralta | Spain | 10.045 | +0.597 | q |
| 16 | Rafał Sarnecki | Poland | 10.128 | +0.680 | q |
| 17 | Davide Boscaro | Italy | 10.140 | +0.692 | q |
| 18 | Francesco Ceci | Italy | 10.155 | +0.707 | q |
| 19 | Artsiom Zaitsau | Belarus | 10.217 | +0.769 | q |
| 20 | Andrei Lukashevich | Belarus | 10.240 | +0.792 | q |
| 21 | Tadei-Ivan Chebanets | Ukraine | 10.356 | +0.908 | q |
| 22 | Sergey Omelchenko | Azerbaijan | 10.805 | +1.357 | q |

=== 1/32 finals ===
Heat winners advanced to the 1/16 finals.

| Heat | Rank | Name | Nation | Gap | Notes |
|---|---|---|---|---|---|
| 3 | 1 | Mateusz Rudyk | Poland | | Q |
| 3 | 2 | Sergey Omelchenko | Azerbaijan | +0.291 | |
| 4 | 1 | Denis Dmitriev | Russia | | Q |
| 4 | 2 | Tadei-Ivan Chebanets | Ukraine | +0.053 | |
| 5 | 1 | Vasilijus Lendel | Lithuania | | Q |
| 5 | 2 | Andrei Lukashevich | Belarus | +0.364 | |
| 6 | 1 | Grégory Baugé | France | | Q |
| 6 | 2 | Artsiom Zaitsau | Belarus | +0.787 | |
| 7 | 1 | Pavel Yakushevskiy | Russia | | Q |
| 7 | 2 | Francesco Ceci | Italy | +0.444 | |
| 8 | 1 | Jason Kenny | Great Britain | | Q |
| 8 | 2 | Davide Boscaro | Italy | +0.096 | |
| 9 | 1 | Rafał Sarnecki | Poland | | Q |
| 9 | 2 | Pavel Kelemen | Czech Republic | REL | |
| 10 | 1 | Quentin Caleyron | France | | Q |
| 10 | 2 | Juan Peralta | Spain | +0.153 | |
| 11 | 1 | Martin Čechman | Czech Republic | | Q |
| 11 | 2 | José Moreno | Spain | +0.036 | |
| 12 | 1 | Jack Carlin | Great Britain | | Q |
| 12 | 2 | Sándor Szalontay | Hungary | +0.099 | |

=== 1/32 finals repechage ===
Heat winners advanced to the 1/16 finals.

| Heat | Rank | Name | Nation | Gap | Notes |
|---|---|---|---|---|---|
| 1 | 1 | Pavel Kelemen | Czech Republic | | Q |
| 1 | 2 | Davide Boscaro | Italy | +0.246 | |
| 2 | 1 | Juan Peralta | Spain | | Q |
| 2 | 2 | Francesco Ceci | Italy | +0.101 | |
| 3 | 1 | Artsiom Zaitsau | Belarus | | Q |
| 3 | 2 | Sergey Omelchenko | Azerbaijan | +0.210 | |
| 3 | 3 | José Moreno | Spain | +0.573 | |
| 4 | 1 | Sándor Szalontay | Hungary | | Q |
| 4 | 2 | Andrei Lukashevich | Belarus | +0.066 | |
| 4 | 3 | Tadei-Ivan Chebanets | Ukraine | +0.113 | |

=== 1/16 finals ===
Heat winners advanced to the 1/8 finals.

| Heat | Rank | Name | Nation | Gap | Notes |
|---|---|---|---|---|---|
| 1 | 1 | Jeffrey Hoogland | Netherlands | | Q |
| 1 | 2 | Sándor Szalontay | Hungary | +0.125 | |
| 2 | 1 | Harrie Lavreysen | Netherlands | | Q |
| 2 | 2 | Artsiom Zaitsau | Belarus | +0.758 | |
| 3 | 1 | Mateusz Rudyk | Poland | | Q |
| 3 | 2 | Juan Peralta | Spain | +0.522 | |
| 4 | 1 | Denis Dmitriev | Russia | | Q |
| 4 | 2 | Pavel Kelemen | Czech Republic | +0.005 | |
| 5 | 1 | Jack Carlin | Great Britain | | Q |
| 5 | 2 | Vasilijus Lendel | Lithuania | +0.694 | |
| 6 | 1 | Grégory Baugé | France | | Q |
| 6 | 2 | Martin Čechman | Czech Republic | +0.041 | |
| 7 | 1 | Quentin Caleyron | France | | Q |
| 7 | 2 | Pavel Yakushevskiy | Russia | REL | |
| 8 | 1 | Jason Kenny | Great Britain | | Q |
| 8 | 2 | Rafał Sarnecki | Poland | +0.062 | |

=== 1/16 finals repechage ===
Heat winners advanced to the 1/8 finals.

| Heat | Rank | Name | Nation | Gap | Notes |
|---|---|---|---|---|---|
| 1 | 1 | Rafał Sarnecki | Poland | | Q |
| 1 | 2 | Sándor Szalontay | Hungary | +0.035 | |
| 2 | 1 | Pavel Yakushevskiy | Russia | | Q |
| 2 | 2 | Artsiom Zaitsau | Belarus | +0.460 | |
| 3 | 1 | Martin Čechman | Czech Republic | | Q |
| 3 | 2 | Juan Peralta | Spain | +0.112 | |
| 4 | 1 | Vasilijus Lendel | Lithuania | | Q |
| 4 | 2 | Pavel Kelemen | Czech Republic | +0.362 | |

=== 1/8 finals ===
Heat winners advanced to the quarterfinals.

| Heat | Rank | Name | Nation | Gap | Notes |
|---|---|---|---|---|---|
| 1 | 1 | Jeffrey Hoogland | Netherlands | | Q |
| 1 | 2 | Vasilijus Lendel | Lithuania | +5.659 | |
| 2 | 1 | Harrie Lavreysen | Netherlands | | Q |
| 2 | 2 | Martin Čechman | Czech Republic | +0.060 | |
| 3 | 1 | Mateusz Rudyk | Poland | | Q |
| 3 | 2 | Pavel Yakushevskiy | Russia | +0.025 | |
| 4 | 1 | Denis Dmitriev | Russia | | Q |
| 4 | 2 | Rafał Sarnecki | Poland | +0.075 | |
| 5 | 1 | Jack Carlin | Great Britain | | Q |
| 5 | 2 | Jason Kenny | Great Britain | +0.056 | |
| 6 | 1 | Quentin Caleyron | France | | Q |
| 6 | 2 | Grégory Baugé | France | +0.009 | |

=== 1/8 finals repechage ===
Heat winners advanced to the quarterfinals.

| Heat | Rank | Name | Nation | Gap | Notes |
|---|---|---|---|---|---|
| 1 | 1 | Vasilijus Lendel | Lithuania | | Q |
| 1 | 2 | Jason Kenny | Great Britain | | |
| 1 | 3 | Rafał Sarnecki | Poland | | |
| 2 | 1 | Grégory Baugé | France | | Q |
| 2 | 2 | Martin Čechman | Czech Republic | | |
| 2 | 3 | Pavel Yakushevskiy | Russia | | |

=== Quarterfinals ===
Matches are extended to a best-of-three format hereon; winners proceed to the semifinals.

| Heat | Rank | Name | Nation | Race 1 | Race 2 | Decider (i.r.) | Notes |
|---|---|---|---|---|---|---|---|
| 1 | 1 | Jeffrey Hoogland | Netherlands | X | X | | Q |
| 1 | 2 | Grégory Baugé | France | +0.473 | +0.068 | | |
| 2 | 1 | Harrie Lavreysen | Netherlands | X | X | | Q |
| 2 | 2 | Vasilijus Lendel | Lithuania | +0.089 | +0.282 | | |
| 3 | 1 | Mateusz Rudyk | Poland | X | +0.044 | X | Q |
| 3 | 2 | Quentin Caleyron | France | +0.065 | X | +0.040 | |
| 4 | 1 | Denis Dmitriev | Russia | X | X | | Q |
| 4 | 2 | Jack Carlin | Great Britain | +0.030 | +0.021 | | |

=== Semifinals ===
Winners proceed to the gold medal final; losers proceed to the bronze medal final.

| Heat | Rank | Name | Nation | Race 1 | Race 2 | Decider (i.r.) | Notes |
|---|---|---|---|---|---|---|---|
| 1 | 1 | Jeffrey Hoogland | Netherlands | X | X | | QG |
| 1 | 2 | Denis Dmitriev | Russia | +2.928 | +0.130 | | QB |
| 2 | 1 | Harrie Lavreysen | Netherlands | X | X | | QG |
| 2 | 2 | Mateusz Rudyk | Poland | +1.318 | +0.109 | | QB |

=== Finals ===
| Rank | Name | Nation | Race 1 | Race 2 | Decider (i.r.) |
|---|---|---|---|---|---|
Gold medal final
| 1st place, gold medalist(s) | Jeffrey Hoogland | Netherlands | +0.012 | X | X |
| 2nd place, silver medalist(s) | Harrie Lavreysen | Netherlands | X | +0.047 | +26.285 |
Bronze medal final
| 3rd place, bronze medalist(s) | Denis Dmitriev | Russia | X | X | |
| 4 | Mateusz Rudyk | Poland | +0.118 | +0.103 | |
