= Cycling at the 2019 European Games – Women's scratch =

Cycling competition held in Belarus

Women's scratch at the 2019 European Games
- Venue: Minsk Velodrome
- Date: 28 June
- Competitors: 16 from 16 nations

Medalists
gold medal	Kirsten Wild	Netherlands
silver medal	Martina Fidanza	Italy
bronze medal	Hanna Tserakh	Belarus

The women's scratch at the 2019 European Games was held at the Minsk Velodrome on 28 June 2019.

== Results ==
First rider across the line without a net lap loss wins.

Rank	Name	Nation	Laps down
1st place, gold medalist(s)	Kirsten Wild	Netherlands	
2nd place, silver medalist(s)	Martina Fidanza	Italy	
3rd place, bronze medalist(s)	Hanna Tserakh	Belarus	
4	Justyna Kaczkowska	Poland	
5	Anita Stenberg	Norway	
6	Ana Usabiaga	Spain	
7	Aline Seitz	Switzerland	
8	Olivija Baleišytė	Lithuania	
9	Maria Martins	Portugal	
10	Alžbeta Bačíková	Slovakia	
11	Orla Walsh	Ireland	
12	Tetyana Klimchenko	Ukraine	
13	Jennifer Holl	Great Britain	
14	Diana Klimova	Russia	
15	Petra Ševčíková	Czech Republic	
16	Gilke Croket	Belgium	
