= Sambo at the 2019 European Games – Women's 80 kg =

Women's 80 kg at the 2019 European Games
- Venue: Minsk Sports Palace
- Date: 23 June
- Competitors: 8 from 8 nations

Medalists
gold medal	Mariya Oryashkova	Bulgaria
silver medal	Zhanara Kusanova	Russia
bronze medal	Sviatlana Tsimashenka	Belarus
bronze medal	Halyna Kovalska	Ukraine

The women's 80 kg sambo event at the 2019 European Games in Minsk was held on 23 June at the Minsk Sports Palace.

== Results ==
Legend

- VS – Total victory by decisive superiority
- VH – Total victory – painful hold

Quarterfinals
Deborah Masy (BEL)	0
Halyna Kovalska (UKR)	9^{VS}
Mariya Oryashkova (BUL)	3
Sviatlana Tsimashenka (BLR)	2
Sacha Gorissen (NED)	0
Zhanara Kusanova (RUS)	1^{VH}
Chloé Bru (FRA)	2
Irine Leonidze (GEO)	0

Semifinals
Halyna Kovalska (UKR)	0
Mariya Oryashkova (BUL)	2
Zhanara Kusanova (RUS)	0^{VH}
Chloé Bru (FRA)	0

Final
Mariya Oryashkova (BUL)	1
Zhanara Kusanova (RUS)	1

Repechage

Repechage
Deborah Masy (BEL)	1
Sviatlana Tsimashenka (BLR)	10^{VS}

Third place
Sviatlana Tsimashenka (BLR)	1^{VH}
Chloé Bru (FRA)	0

Repechage
Sacha Gorissen (NED)	0
Irine Leonidze (GEO)	1

Third place
Irine Leonidze (GEO)	1
Halyna Kovalska (UKR)	4^{VH}
