= Sambo at the 2019 European Games – Women's 68 kg =

Women's 68 kg at the 2019 European Games
- Venue: Minsk Sports Palace
- Date: 23 June
- Competitors: 8 from 8 nations

Medalists
gold medal	Lucija Babić	Croatia
silver medal	Kateryna Moskalova	Ukraine
bronze medal	Marina Mokhnatkina	Russia
bronze medal	Volha Namazava	Belarus

The women's 68 kg sambo event at the 2019 European Games in Minsk was held on 23 June at the Minsk Sports Palace.

== Results ==
Legend

- VS – Total victory by decisive superiority
- VH – Total victory – painful hold

Quarterfinals
Marina Mokhnatkina (RUS)	3
Kateryna Moskalova (UKR)	3
Tiphaine Le Gall (FRA)	0
Ivana Jandrić (SRB)	9^{VS}
Lucija Babić (CRO)	3
Volha Namazava (BLR)	0
Natalia Budeanu (MDA)	2
Magdalena Jarkowska (POL)	1

Semifinals
Kateryna Moskalova (UKR)	2
Ivana Jandrić (SRB)	2
Lucija Babić (CRO)	3
Natalia Budeanu (MDA)	2

Final
Kateryna Moskalova (UKR)	0
Lucija Babić (CRO)	4

Repechage

Repechage
Marina Mokhnatkina (RUS)	2^{VH}
Tiphaine Le Gall (FRA)	0

Third place
Marina Mokhnatkina (RUS)	0^{VH}
Natalia Budeanu (MDA)	0

Repechage
Volha Namazava (BLR)	1
Magdalena Jarkowska (POL)	1

Third place
Volha Namazava (BLR)	1
Ivana Jandrić (SRB)	1
