= Cycling at the 2019 European Games – Men's keirin =

Men's keirin at the 2019 European Games
- Venue: Minsk Velodrome
- Date: 30 June
- Competitors: 22 from 13 nations

Medalists
gold medal	Harrie Lavreysen	Netherlands
silver medal	Rayan Helal	France
bronze medal	Denis Dmitriev	Russia

The men's keirin at the 2019 European Games was held at the Minsk Velodrome on 30 June 2019.

== Results ==
=== First round ===
The first two riders in each heat qualified to the second round, all other riders advanced to the first round repechages.

Heat 1

Rank	Name	Nation	Notes
1	Quentin Lafargue	France	Q
2	Krzysztof Maksel	Poland	Q
3	José Moreno	Spain	
4	Francesco Ceci	Italy	
5	Artsiom Zaitsau	Belarus	

Heat 2

Rank	Name	Nation	Notes
1	Denis Dmitriev	Russia	Q
2	Tomáš Bábek	Czech Republic	Q
3	Uladzislau Novik	Belarus	
4	Sándor Szalontay	Hungary	
5	Sergey Omelchenko	Azerbaijan	

Heat 3

Rank	Name	Nation	Notes
1	Joseph Truman	Great Britain	Q
2	Harrie Lavreysen	Netherlands	Q
3	Pavel Kelemen	Czech Republic	
4	Svajūnas Jonauskas	Lithuania	
5	Davide Boscaro	Italy	
6	Patryk Rajkowski	Poland	

Heat 4

Rank	Name	Nation	Notes
1	Jeffrey Hoogland	Netherlands	Q
2	Rayan Helal	France	Q
3	Jason Kenny	Great Britain	
4	Juan Peralta	Spain	
5	Dmytro Stovbetskyi	Ukraine	
6	Alexander Dubchenko	Russia	

=== First round repechage ===
The first rider in each heat qualified to the second round.

Heat 1

Rank	Name	Nation	Notes
1	Juan Peralta	Spain	Q
2	José Moreno	Spain	
3	Davide Boscaro	Italy	

Heat 2

Rank	Name	Nation	Notes
1	Svajūnas Jonauskas	Lithuania	Q
2	Uladzislau Novik	Belarus	
3	Sergey Omelchenko	Azerbaijan	

Heat 3

Rank	Name	Nation	Notes
1	Pavel Kelemen	Czech Republic	Q
2	Alexander Dubchenko	Russia	
3	Artsiom Zaitsau	Belarus	
4	Sándor Szalontay	Hungary	

Heat 4

Rank	Name	Nation	Notes
1	Jason Kenny	Great Britain	Q
2	Francesco Ceci	Italy	
3	Patryk Rajkowski	Poland	
4	Dmytro Stovbetskyi	Ukraine	

=== Second round ===
The first three riders in each heat qualified to final 1–6, all other riders advanced to final 7–12.

Heat 1

Rank	Name	Nation	Notes
1	Harrie Lavreysen	Netherlands	Q
2	Juan Peralta	Spain	Q
3	Tomáš Bábek	Czech Republic	Q
4	Jeffrey Hoogland	Netherlands	
5	Jason Kenny	Great Britain	
6	Quentin Lafargue	France	

Heat 2

Rank	Name	Nation	Notes
1	Rayan Helal	France	Q
2	Denis Dmitriev	Russia	Q
3	Krzysztof Maksel	Poland	Q
4	Joseph Truman	Great Britain	
5	Pavel Kelemen	Czech Republic	
6	Svajūnas Jonauskas	Lithuania	

=== Finals ===
Small final

Rank	Name	Nation	Notes
7	Jason Kenny	Great Britain	
8	Pavel Kelemen	Czech Republic	
9	Jeffrey Hoogland	Netherlands	
10	Joseph Truman	Great Britain	
11	Svajūnas Jonauskas	Lithuania	
12	Quentin Lafargue	France	

Final

Rank	Name	Nation	Notes
1st place, gold medalist(s)	Harrie Lavreysen	Netherlands	
2nd place, silver medalist(s)	Rayan Helal	France	
3rd place, bronze medalist(s)	Denis Dmitriev	Russia	
4	Krzysztof Maksel	Poland	
5	Tomáš Bábek	Czech Republic	
6	Juan Peralta	Spain	
