= Boxing at the 2019 European Games – Women's 75 kg =

Boxing competitions

Women's middleweight boxing at the 2019 European Games
- Venue: Uruchie Sports Palace
- Date: 25–30 June
- Competitors: 12 from 12 nations

Medalists
gold medal	Lauren Price	Great Britain
silver medal	Nouchka Fontijn	Netherlands
bronze medal	Darima Sandakova	Russia
bronze medal	Elżbieta Wójcik	Poland

The women's middleweight 75 kg boxing event at the 2019 European Games in Minsk was held from 25 to 30 June at the Uruchie Sports Palace.

== Results ==
Round of 16; 25 June
Busenaz Sürmeneli (TUR)	4
Love Holgersson (SWE)	1
Tímea Nagy (HUN)	0
Elżbieta Wójcik (POL)	5
Darima Sandakova (RUS)	5
Patricia Martín (ESP)	0
Viktoria Kebikava (BLR)	1
Aoife O'Rourke (IRL)	4

Quarterfinals; 26 June
Nouchka Fontijn (NED)	5
Busenaz Sürmeneli (TUR)	0
Elżbieta Wójcik (POL)	4
Sarah Scheurich (GER)	1
Mariya Borutsa (UKR)	0
Darima Sandakova (RUS)	5
Aoife O'Rourke (IRL)	0
Lauren Price (GBR)	5

Semifinals; 28 June
Nouchka Fontijn (NED)	3
Elżbieta Wójcik (POL)	2
Darima Sandakova (RUS)	0
Lauren Price (GBR)	5

Final; 30 June
Nouchka Fontijn (NED)	1
Lauren Price (GBR)	4
