= Gymnastics at the 2019 European Games – Men's horizontal bar =

Men's horizontal bar at the 2019 European Games
- Venue: Minsk-Arena
- Date: 30 June
- Competitors: 6 from 6 nations
- Winning score: 14.400

Medalists
gold medal	Robert Tvorogal	Lithuania
silver medal	Ahmet Önder	Turkey
bronze medal	Dávid Vecsernyés	Hungary

The men's artistic gymnastics horizontal bar competition at the 2019 European Games was held at the Minsk-Arena on 30 June 2019.

== Qualification ==
The top six gymnasts with one per country advanced to the final.

Rank	Gymnast	D Score	E Score	Pen.	Total	Qual.
1	Carlo Macchini (ITA)	5.700	8.633		14.333	Q
2	David Belyavskiy (RUS)	5.700	8.500		14.200	Q
3	Robert Tvorogal (LTU)	5.800	8.233		14.033	Q
4	Andrey Likhovitskiy (BLR)	5.700	8.300		14.000	Q
5	Ahmet Önder (TUR)	5.700	8.233		13.933	Q
6	Dávid Vecsernyés (HUN)	5.500	8.366		13.866	Q
7	Alexander Shatilov (ISR)	5.500	8.333		13.833	R1
8	Nicolò Mozzato (ITA)	5.600	8.233		13.833	
9	Néstor Abad (ESP)	5.900	7.900		13.800	R2
10	Vladislav Polyashov (RUS)	5.400	8.366		13.766	
11	Jimmy Verbaeys (BEL)	5.100	8.500		13.600	R3

== Final ==
Rank	Gymnast	D Score	E Score	Pen.	Total
1st place, gold medalist(s)	Robert Tvorogal (LTU)	6.100	8.300		14.400
2nd place, silver medalist(s)	Ahmet Önder (TUR)	5.700	8.400		14.100
3rd place, bronze medalist(s)	Dávid Vecsernyés (HUN)	5.500	8.566		14.066
4	Andrey Likhovitskiy (BLR)	5.500	8.333		13.833
5	David Belyavskiy (RUS)	5.500	7.966		13.466
6	Carlo Macchini (ITA)	5.600	7.600		13.200
