= Boxing at the 2019 European Games – Women's 57 kg =

Boxing competitions

Women's featherweight boxing at the 2019 European Games
- Venue: Uruchie Sports Palace
- Date: 24–29 June
- Competitors: 12 from 12 nations

Medalists
gold medal	Stanimira Petrova	Bulgaria
silver medal	Michaela Walsh	Ireland
bronze medal	Jemyma Betrian	Netherlands
bronze medal	Daria Abramova	Russia

The women's featherweight 57 kg boxing event at the 2019 European Games in Minsk was held from 24 to 29 June at the Uruchie Sports Palace.

== Results ==
Round of 16; 24 June
Lăcrămioara Perijoc (ROU)	1
Michaela Walsh (IRL)	4
Helina Bruyevich (BLR)	5
Sara Beram (CRO)	0
Mona Mestiaen (FRA)	5
Jelena Zekić (SRB)	0
Alessia Mesiano (ITA)	3
Satı Burcu (TUR)	2

Quarterfinals; 26 June
Ornella Wahner (GER)	1
Michaela Walsh (IRL)	4
Helina Bruyevich (BLR)	2
Daria Abramova (RUS)	3
Stanimira Petrova (BUL)	5
Mona Mestiaen (FRA)	0
Alessia Mesiano (ITA)	2
Jemyma Betrian (NED)	3

Semifinals; 28 June
Michaela Walsh (IRL)	3
Daria Abramova (RUS)	2
Stanimira Petrova (BUL)	3
Jemyma Betrian (NED)	2

Final; 29 June
Michaela Walsh (IRL)	1
Stanimira Petrova (BUL)	4
