= Boxing at the 2019 European Games – Women's 69 kg =

Boxing competitions

Women's welterweight boxing at the 2019 European Games
- Venue: Uruchie Sports Palace
- Date: 24–29 June
- Competitors: 12 from 12 nations

Medalists
| gold medal | Karolina Koszewska | Poland |
| silver medal | Assunta Canfora | Italy |
| bronze medal | Gráinne Walsh | Ireland |
| bronze medal | Nadine Apetz | Germany |

The women's welterweight 69 kg boxing event at the 2019 European Games in Minsk was held from 24 to 29 June at the Uruchie Sports Palace.

== Results ==
Round of 16; 24 June
Vivien Budai (HUN) | 4
Maryam Jabrailova (AZE) | 1
Émilie Sonvico (FRA) | 3
Martina Schmoranzová (CZE) | 1
Antanina Aksenava (BLR) | 0
Karolina Koszewska (POL) | 5
Gráinne Walsh (IRL) | 4
Rosie Eccles (GBR) | 1

Quarterfinals; 26 June
Nadine Apetz (GER) | 5
Vivien Budai (HUN) | 0
Émilie Sonvico (FRA) | 0
Assunta Canfora (ITA) | 5
Yaroslava Yakushina (RUS) | 1
Karolina Koszewska (POL) | 4
Gráinne Walsh (IRL) | 5
Elina Gustafsson (FIN) | 0

Semifinals; 28 June
Nadine Apetz (GER) | 2
Assunta Canfora (ITA) | 3
Karolina Koszewska (POL) | 3
Gráinne Walsh (IRL) | 2

Final; 29 June
Assunta Canfora (ITA) | 1
Karolina Koszewska (POL) | 4
