= Sambo at the 2019 European Games – Women's 56 kg =

Women's 56 kg at the 2019 European Games
- Venue: Minsk Sports Palace
- Date: 22 June
- Competitors: 8 from 8 nations

Medalists
gold medal	Tatiana Kazeniuk	Russia
silver medal	Anastasiia Arkhipava	Belarus
bronze medal	Laure Fournier	France
bronze medal	Daniela Poroineanu	Romania

The women's 56 kg sambo event at the 2019 European Games in Minsk was held on 22 June at the Minsk Sports Palace.

== Results ==
Legend

- VI – Total victory by injury
- VS – Total victory by decisive superiority
- VH – Total victory – painful hold
- VW – Total victory by withdrawal

Quarterfinals
Nataliya Ilkiv (UKR)	0
Tatiana Kazeniuk (RUS)	2
Valentina Gogua (GRE)	2^{VW}
Mariana Donos (MDA)	0
Laure Fournier (FRA)	2^{VH}
Mariam Janashvili (GEO)	0
Anastasiia Arkhipava (BLR)	1
Daniela Poroineanu (ROU)	0

Semifinals
Tatiana Kazeniuk (RUS)	8^{VS}
Valentina Gogua (GRE)	0
Laure Fournier (FRA)	0
Anastasiia Arkhipava (BLR)	1

Final
Tatiana Kazeniuk (RUS)	8^{VS}
Anastasiia Arkhipava (BLR)	0

Repechage

Repechage
Nataliya Ilkiv (UKR)	0^{VI}
Mariana Donos (MDA)	0

Third place
Nataliya Ilkiv (UKR)	2
Laure Fournier (FRA)	5^{VH}

Repechage
Mariam Janashvili (GEO)	0
Daniela Poroineanu (ROU)	1^{VH}

Third place
Daniela Poroineanu (ROU)	0^{VH}
Valentina Gogua (GRE)	0
