= Cycling at the 2019 European Games – Women's keirin =

Women's keirin at the 2019 European Games
- Venue: Minsk Velodrome
- Date: 28 June
- Competitors: 22 from 13 nations

Medalists
| gold medal | Simona Krupeckaitė | Lithuania |
| silver medal | Shanne Braspennincx | Netherlands |
| bronze medal | Daria Shmeleva | Russia |

The women's keirin at the 2019 European Games was held at the Minsk Velodrome on 28 June 2019.

== Results ==
=== First round ===
The first two riders in each heat qualified to the second round, all other riders advanced to the first round repechages.

Heat 1

| Rank | Name | Nation | Notes |
|---|---|---|---|
| 1 | Shanne Braspennincx | Netherlands | Q |
| 2 | Daria Shmeleva | Russia | Q |
| 3 | Helena Casas | Spain | |
| 4 | Sophie Capewell | Great Britain | |
| 5 | Sandie Clair | France | |

Heat 2

| Rank | Name | Nation | Notes |
|---|---|---|---|
| 1 | Laurine van Riessen | Netherlands | Q |
| 2 | Lyubov Basova | Ukraine | Q |
| 3 | Katy Marchant | Great Britain | |
| 4 | Tania Calvo | Spain | |
| 5 | Miglė Marozaitė | Lithuania | |

Heat 3

| Rank | Name | Nation | Notes |
|---|---|---|---|
| 1 | Mathilde Gros | France | Q |
| 2 | Simona Krupeckaitė | Lithuania | Q |
| 3 | Sára Kaňkovská | Czech Republic | |
| 4 | Robyn Stewart | Ireland | |
| 5 | Miriam Vece | Italy | |
| 6 | Marlena Karwacka | Poland | |

Heat 4

| Rank | Name | Nation | Notes |
|---|---|---|---|
| 1 | Nicky Degrendele | Belgium | Q |
| 2 | Olena Starikova | Ukraine | Q |
| 3 | Urszula Łoś | Poland | |
| 4 | Ekaterina Gnidenko | Russia | |
| 5 | Maila Andreotti | Italy | |
| 6 | Dziyana Miadzvetskaya | Belarus | |

=== First round repechage ===
The first rider in each heat qualified to the second round.

Heat 1

| Rank | Name | Nation | Notes |
|---|---|---|---|
| 1 | Miriam Vece | Italy | Q |
| 2 | Ekaterina Gnidenko | Russia | |
| 3 | Helena Casas | Spain | |

Heat 2

| Rank | Name | Nation | Notes |
|---|---|---|---|
| 1 | Katy Marchant | Great Britain | Q |
| 2 | Robyn Stewart | Ireland | |
| 3 | Miglė Marozaitė | Lithuania | |

Heat 3

| Rank | Name | Nation | Notes |
|---|---|---|---|
| 1 | Sandie Clair | France | Q |
| 2 | Tania Calvo | Spain | |
| 3 | Sára Kaňkovská | Czech Republic | |
| 4 | Dziyana Miadzvetskaya | Belarus | |

Heat 4

| Rank | Name | Nation | Notes |
|---|---|---|---|
| 1 | Urszula Łoś | Poland | Q |
| 2 | Marlena Karwacka | Poland | |
| 3 | Maila Andreotti | Italy | |
| 4 | Sophie Capewell | Great Britain | |

=== Second round ===
The first three riders in each heat qualified to final 1–6, all other riders advanced to final 7–12.

Heat 1

| Rank | Name | Nation | Notes |
|---|---|---|---|
| 1 | Simona Krupeckaitė | Lithuania | Q |
| 2 | Shanne Braspennincx | Netherlands | Q |
| 3 | Urszula Łoś | Poland | Q |
| 4 | Nicky Degrendele | Belgium | |
| 5 | Lyubov Basova | Ukraine | |
| 6 | Miriam Vece | Italy | |

Heat 2

| Rank | Name | Nation | Notes |
|---|---|---|---|
| 1 | Mathilde Gros | France | Q |
| 2 | Sandie Clair | France | Q |
| 3 | Daria Shmeleva | Russia | Q |
| 4 | Katy Marchant | Great Britain | |
| 5 | Olena Starikova | Ukraine | |
| 6 | Laurine van Riessen | Netherlands | |

=== Finals ===
Small final

| Rank | Name | Nation | Notes |
|---|---|---|---|
| 7 | Nicky Degrendele | Belgium | |
| 8 | Lyubov Basova | Ukraine | |
| 9 | Katy Marchant | Great Britain | |
| 10 | Olena Starikova | Ukraine | |
| 11 | Laurine van Riessen | Netherlands | |
| 12 | Miriam Vece | Italy | |

Final

| Rank | Name | Nation | Notes |
|---|---|---|---|
| 1st place, gold medalist(s) | Simona Krupeckaitė | Lithuania | |
| 2nd place, silver medalist(s) | Shanne Braspennincx | Netherlands | |
| 3rd place, bronze medalist(s) | Daria Shmeleva | Russia | |
| 4 | Sandie Clair | France | |
| 5 | Urszula Łoś | Poland | |
| 6 | Mathilde Gros | France | |
