= Cycling at the 2019 European Games =

- Venues: Minsk city centre (Road); Minsk Arena Velodrome (Track)
- Location: Minsk, Belarus
- Dates: 22−30 June
- Competitors: 542 (expected)

The cycling competitions of the 2019 European Games in Minsk were held at two venues, twenty-four events between 22 June and 30 June.

The venues were Minsk city centre for the road cycling road race and Minsk Arena Velodrome for the track cycling events.

Cycling competitions have been contested in both of the European Games since the first in 2015.

== Venues ==
| Venue | Sport | Date | Medal events | Capacity |
|---|---|---|---|---|
| Minsk city centre | Road cycling (road race) | 22–25 June | 4 | Unlimited (standing) |
| Minsk Arena Velodrome | Track cycling | 27–30 June | 20 | 2000 (seating) |

== Medal table ==
* Host nation (Belarus)

| Rank | Nation | Gold | Silver | Bronze | Total |
|---|---|---|---|---|---|
| 1 | Netherlands | 7 | 7 | 1 | 15 |
| 2 | Russia | 5 | 1 | 7 | 13 |
| 3 | Italy | 2 | 5 | 2 | 9 |
| 4 | Switzerland | 2 | 1 | 2 | 5 |
| 5 | Belarus* | 2 | 0 | 3 | 5 |
| 6 | Greece | 2 | 0 | 0 | 2 |
| 7 | Great Britain | 1 | 1 | 2 | 4 |
| 8 | Lithuania | 1 | 1 | 0 | 2 |
| 8 | Ukraine | 1 | 1 | 0 | 2 |
| 10 | Czech Republic | 1 | 0 | 2 | 3 |
| 11 | France | 0 | 3 | 0 | 3 |
| 12 | Poland | 0 | 1 | 3 | 4 |
| 13 | Austria | 0 | 1 | 2 | 3 |
| 14 | Estonia | 0 | 1 | 0 | 1 |
| 14 | Portugal | 0 | 1 | 0 | 1 |
| Totals (15 entries) | | 24 | 24 | 24 | 72 |

== Medal summary ==
=== Road cycling ===
| Event | Gold | Silver | Bronze |
|---|---|---|---|
| Men's road race | Davide Ballerini; Italy | Alo Jakin; Estonia | Daniel Auer; Austria |
| Men's time trial | Vasil Kiryienka; Belarus | Nelson Oliveira; Portugal | Jan Bárta; Czech Republic |
| Women's road race | Lorena Wiebes; Netherlands | Marianne Vos; Netherlands | Tatsiana Sharakova; Belarus |
| Women's time trial | Marlen Reusser; Switzerland | Chantal Blaak; Netherlands | Hayley Simmonds; Great Britain |

=== Track cycling ===
==== Men ====
| Event | Gold | Silver | Bronze |
|---|---|---|---|
| Keirin | Harrie Lavreysen; Netherlands | Rayan Helal; France | Denis Dmitriev; Russia |
| Madison | Switzerland; Robin Froidevaux; Tristan Marguet | Netherlands; Jan-Willem van Schip; Yoeri Havik | Austria; Andreas Graf; Andreas Müller |
| Omnium | Jan-Willem van Schip; Netherlands | Théry Schir; Switzerland | Daniel Staniszewski; Poland |
| Individual pursuit | Ivan Smirnov; Russia | Davide Plebani; Italy | Claudio Imhof; Switzerland |
| Team pursuit | Russia; Gleb Syritsa; Nikita Bersenev; Lev Gonov; Ivan Smirnov | Italy; Francesco Lamon; Carloalberto Giordani; Davide Plebani; Liam Bertazzo; Stefano Moro | Switzerland; Théry Schir; Robin Froidevaux; Lukas Rüegg; Claudio Imhof; Nico Selenati |
| Sprint | Jeffrey Hoogland; Netherlands | Harrie Lavreysen; Netherlands | Denis Dmitriev; Russia |
| Team sprint | Netherlands; Roy van den Berg; Harrie Lavreysen; Jeffrey Hoogland; Nils van 't Hoenderdaal | France; Grégory Baugé; Rayan Helal; Quentin Caleyron; Quentin Lafargue | Great Britain; Jack Carlin; Jason Kenny; Ryan Owens; Joseph Truman |
| 1 km time trial | Tomáš Bábek; Czech Republic | Francesco Lamon; Italy | Krzysztof Maksel; Poland |
| Points race | Christos Volikakis; Greece | Jan-Willem van Schip; Netherlands | Dmitrii Mukhomediarov; Russia |
| Scratch | Christos Volikakis; Greece | Filip Prokopyszyn; Poland | Yauheni Karaliok; Belarus |

==== Women ====
| Event | Gold | Silver | Bronze |
|---|---|---|---|
| Keirin | Simona Krupeckaitė; Lithuania | Shanne Braspennincx; Netherlands | Daria Shmeleva; Russia |
| Madison | Great Britain; Jessica Roberts; Megan Barker | Netherlands; Kirsten Wild; Amber van der Hulst | Russia; Diana Klimova; Maria Novolodskaya |
| Omnium | Kirsten Wild; Netherlands | Evgeniya Augustinas; Russia | Elisa Balsamo; Italy |
| Individual pursuit | Tatsiana Sharakova; Belarus | Marta Cavalli; Italy | Tamara Dronova; Russia |
| Team pursuit | Italy; Elisa Balsamo; Martina Alzini; Marta Cavalli; Letizia Paternoster | Great Britain; Jessica Roberts; Megan Barker; Jennifer Holl; Josie Knight | Poland; Katarzyna Pawłowska; Justyna Kaczkowska; Karolina Karasiewicz; Nikol Płosaj |
| Sprint | Anastasia Voynova; Russia | Mathilde Gros; France | Daria Shmeleva; Russia |
| Team sprint | Russia; Daria Shmeleva; Anastasia Voynova; Ekaterina Rogovaia | Lithuania; Simona Krupeckaitė; Miglė Marozaitė | Netherlands; Kyra Lamberink; Shanne Braspennincx; Hetty van de Wouw |
| 500 m time trial | Daria Shmeleva; Russia | Olena Starikova; Ukraine | Miriam Vece; Italy |
| Points race | Hanna Solovey; Ukraine | Verena Eberhardt; Austria | Jarmila Machačová; Czech Republic |
| Scratch | Kirsten Wild; Netherlands | Martina Fidanza; Italy | Hanna Tserakh; Belarus |
