= Daria Abramova =

Russian former amateur boxer (born 1990)

Personal information
- Nationality: (Russia) Russian
- Born: 17 April 1990 (age 36) Shchekino, Russian SFSR, Soviet Union

Boxing career
- Weight class: Featherweight
Medal record
Women's amateur boxing
Representing Russia
World Championships
Silver medal – second place	2012 Qinhuangdao	Light welterweight
European Games
Bronze medal – third place	2019 Minsk	Featherweight
European Championships
Gold medal – first place	2016 Sofia	Lightweight
Silver medal – second place	2018 Sofia	Featherweight
Silver medal – second place	2024 Belgrade	Featherweight

Daria Alexeyevna Abramova (Russian: Дарья Алексеевна Абрамова, born 17 April 1990) is a Russian amateur boxer. She won a bronze medal at the 2019 European Games in Minsk, Belarus, as a featherweight. After her amateur career, she did not pursue a professional boxing career. She had a record of 30 wins and 13 defeats as an amateur, with 1 win and 1 loss coming by knockout or technical knockout.
