= Arbresha Rexhepi =

Macedonian judoka (born 2000)

Personal information
- Nationality: North Macedonia
- Born: 31 October 2000 (age 25) Skopje

Sport
- Sport: Judo
- Event: Half-lightweight (52 kg)
- Team: North Macedonia

Achievements and titles
- Olympic finals: 2020 Summer Olympics
- Highest world ranking: 252

Arbresha Rexhepi (born 31 October 2000) is a Macedonian judoka.

== Career ==
In 2018 she competed in the XVIII Mediterranean Games (2018 Mediterranean Games). In 2019 she competed in the 2nd European Games.

As of 2019 she was ranked 252 in Senior Female -52 kg Division on World Judo List. She won a bronze medal in the Cadet European Cup.

== Achievements ==
=== 2020 Summer Olympics ===
She qualified after the last qualifying Invitational spots from International Judo Federation (IJF) to represent North Macedonia in Women's 52 kg (Half-lightweight) at the Judo competition of the 2020 Summer Olympics in Tokyo, Japan.

== Tournaments Record ==
Competitions
Year	Dates	Name	Position
2015	14. Feb 2015	Cadet European Cup Zagreb 2015	-
2015	07. Mar 2015	Cadet European Cup Antalya 2015	-
2015	07. Mar 2015	Cadet European Cup Antalya 2015	-
2015	11. Apr 2015	Cadet European Cup Teplice 2015	-
2015	02. May 2015	Cadet European Cup Berlin 2015	-
2015	09. May 2015	Cadet European Cup Cluj Napoca 2015	-
2015	03. Jul 2015	Cadet European Judo Championships 2015	-
2015	05. Aug 2015	World Championships Cadets 2015	-
2016	13. Feb 2016	Cadet European Cup Fuengirola 2016	-
2016	20. Feb 2016	Cadet European Cup Follonica 2016	-
2016	05. Mar 2016	Cadet European Cup Antalya 2016	5
2016	12. Mar 2016	Cadet European Cup Zagreb 2016	-
2016	16. Apr 2016	Cadet European Cup Teplice	-
2016	30. Apr 2016	Cadet European Cup Berlin 2016	-
2016	07. May 2016	Cadet European Cup Cluj Napoca 2016	3
2016	28. May 2016	Cadet European Cup Coimbra 2016	7
2016	01. Jul 2016	Cadet European Championships 2016	-
2017	06. May 2017	Ploiesti Cadet European Cup 2017	-
2017	20. May 2017	Bielsko Biala Cadet European Cup 2017	-
2017	30. Jun 2017	Cadet European Championships 2017	-
2017	25. Jul 2017	EYOF 2017	-
2017	09. Aug 2017	World Championship Cadets & Teams 2017	-
2017	18. Oct 2017	World Championships Juniors & Teams 2017	-
2017	28. Oct 2017	Koper Cadet European Cup 2017	-
2018	27. Jun 2018	The XVIII Mediterranean Games (2018 Mediterranean Games)	=
2019	23. Mar 2019	Athens Junior European Cup 2019	-
2019	05. Apr 2019	Antalya Grand Prix 2019	-
2019	22. Jun 2019	European Games Minsk 2019	-
2019	12. Sep 2019	European Junior Championships 2019	-
2021	01. May 2021	European Judo Open 2021 Zagreb, Croatia	-
