= Poland at the 2019 European Games =

- IOC code: POL
- NOC: Polish Olympic Committee
- Website: www.olimpijski.pl

in Minsk, Belarus 21 – 30 June 2019
- Competitors: 151 in 14 sports
- Medals Ranked 22nd: Gold 3 Silver 1 Bronze 10 Total 14

European Games appearances (overview)
- 2015; 2019; 2023; 2027

Poland competed at the 2019 European Games, in Minsk, Belarus from 21 to 30 June 2019. Poland has previously competed at the 2015 European Games in Baku, Azerbaijan, where it won 20 medals, including two golds. With Kraków as the host city of the 2023 European Games, the Polish segment is expected to be performed at the closing ceremony.

== Medalists ==
Medal	Name	Sport	Event	Date
Gold	Łukasz Jaworski; Artur Zakrzewski	Gymnastics	Men's synchronized trampoline	24 June
Gold	Tomasz Kaczor	Canoeing	Men's C1 1000m	26 June
Gold	Karolina Koszewska	Boxing	Women's 69 kg	29 June
Silver	Filip Prokopyszyn	Cycling	Men's scratch	27 June
Bronze	Katarzyna Kołodziejczyk; Anna Puławska; Karolina Naja; Helena Wiśniewska	Canoeing	Women's K4 500m	27 June
Bronze	Dorota Borowska	Canoeing	Women's C1 200m	27 June
Bronze	Marta Walczykiewicz	Canoeing	Women's K1 200m	27 June
Bronze	Sandra Drabik	Boxing	Women's 51 kg	28 June
Bronze	Nikol Płosaj; Karolina Karasiewicz; Katarzyna Pawłowska; Justyna Kaczkowska	Cycling	Women's team pursuit	28 June
Bronze	Elżbieta Wójcik	Boxing	Women's 75 kg	28 June
Bronze	Natalia Bajor; Li Qian; Natalia Partyka	Table tennis	Women's team	29 June
Bronze	Krzysztof Maksel	Cycling	Men's 1 km time trial	29 June
Bronze	Arkadiusz Kułynycz	Wrestling	Men's Greco-Roman 87 kg	30 June
Bronze	Daniel Staniszewski	Cycling	Men's omnium	30 June

== Archery ==
Recurve

Athlete	Event	Ranking round		Round of 64	Round of 32	Round of 16	Quarterfinals	Semifinals	Final / BM	
Athlete	Event	Score	Seed	Opposition Score	Opposition Score	Opposition Score	Opposition Score	Opposition Score	Opposition Score	Rank
Kacper Sierakowski	Men's individual	630	40	Bizjak (SLO); W 6–2	Havelko (UKR); W 6–2	Pasqualucci (ITA); L 1–7	did not advance			16
Sylwia Zyzańska	Women's individual	623	26	Putkaradze (GEO); L 4–6	did not advance					26
Kacper Sierakowski; Sylwia Zyzańska	Mixed team	1253	16	—N/a	Georgia; L 1–5	Did not advance				17

Compound

Athlete	Event	Ranking round		Round of 16	Quarterfinals	Semifinals	Final / BM	
Athlete	Event	Score	Seed	Opposition Score	Opposition Score	Opposition Score	Opposition Score	Rank
Łukasz Przybylski	Men's individual	685	13	Bulaev (RUS); L 142–143	Did not advance			13

== Athletics ==
Roster

- Urszula Bhebhe
- Karolina Bołdysz
- Dominika Dabulis
- Angelika Faka
- Mariola Karaś
- Marta Kąkol
- Małgorzata Linkiewicz
- Aleksandra Lubicka
- Katarzyna Tuniewicz
- Ewelina Wyszczelska
- Magdalena Żebrowska
- Jakub Adamczyk
- Maciej Brzeziński
- Bartłomiej Czajkowski
- Adam Czerwiński
- Michał Galikowski
- Karol Hoffmann
- Mariusz Jurczyk
- Artur Noga
- Bartosz Rożnowski

== Badminton ==
Athletes	Event	Group stage				Round of 16	Quarterfinals	Semifinals	Final	Rank
Athletes	Event	Opposition Score	Opposition Score	Opposition Score	Rank	Opposition Score	Opposition Score	Opposition Score	Opposition Score	Rank
Michał Rogalski	Men's singles	Savin (MDA); W 2–0	Atilano (POR); W 2–0	Caljouw (NED); L 0–2	2 Q	Leverdez (FRA); L 1–2	did not advance			
Miłosz Bochat; Adam Cwalina	Men's doubles	Astrup; Rasmussen (DEN); L 1–2	Mass / Tabeling (NED); L 1–2	Greco / Strobl (ITA); L 0–2	4	did not advance				
Paweł Śmiłowski; Magdalena Świerczyńska	Mixed doubles	Lamsfuß / Herttrich (GER); L 0–2	Zilberman / Zilberman (ISR); W 2–0	Tabeling / Piek (NED); L 1–2	3	did not advance				

== Basketball 3x3 ==
Team roster

Men

Maciej Adamkiewicz
Mariusz Konopatzki
Wojciech Pisarczyk
Michał Wojtyński

Summary

Team	Event	Group stage				Quarterfinals	Semifinals	Final / BM	
Team	Event	Opposition Score	Opposition Score	Opposition Score	Rank	Opposition Score	Opposition Score	Opposition Score	Rank
Poland	Men's tournament	Romania; W 21–9	Serbia; L 14–20	Andorra; W 21–12	2 Q	Lithuania; W 19–16	Russia; L 13–17	Belarus; L 15–21	4

== Boxing ==
Athlete	Event	Round of 32	Round of 16	Quarterfinals	Semifinals	Final	
Athlete	Event	Opposition Result	Opposition Result	Opposition Result	Opposition Result	Opposition Result	Rank
Jakub Słowiński	Men's 49 kg	—N/a	Ahmed (GBR); L 0–5	Did not advance			
Jarosław Iwanow	Men's 56 kg	Gomtsyan (GEO); L 0–5	Did not advance				
Radomir Obruśniak	Men's 60 kg	Suciu (ROU); L 2–3	Did not advance				
Damian Durkacz	Men's 64 kg	Orozco Ojeda (ESP); W 3–0	Konovalov (SRB); W 5–0	Oumiha (FRA); L 0–5	Did not advance		5
Filip Wąchała	Men's 69 kg	Belous (MDA); L 0–5	Did not advance				
Rafał Perczyński	Men's 75 kg	Bartl (CZE); L KO	Did not advance				
Mateusz Goiński	Men's 81 kg	Whittaker (GBR); L 0–5	Did not advance				
Tomasz Niedźwiecki	Men's 91 kg	Karlson (EST); L 2–3	Did not advance				
Adam Kulik	Men's +91 kg	Tiafack (GER); L 0–5	Did not advance				
Sandra Drabik	Women's 51 kg	—N/a	bye	Grigoryan (ARM); W 5–0	Cakiroglu (TUR); L 0–5	Did not advance	3rd place, bronze medalist(s)
Aneta Rygielska	Women's 60 kg	—N/a	Alexiusson (SWE); L 0–5	Did not advance			
Karolina Koszewska	Women's 69 kg	—N/a	Aksenava (BLR); W 5–0	Yakushina (RUS); W 4–1	Walsh (IRL); W 3–2	Canfora (ITA); W 4–1	1st place, gold medalist(s)
Elźbieta Wójcik	Women's 75 kg	—N/a	Nagy (HUN); W 5–0	Scheurich (GER); W 4–1	Fontijn (NED); L 2–3	Did not advance	3rd place, bronze medalist(s)

== Canoeing ==
Men

Athlete	Event	Heats		Semifinals		Finals	
Athlete	Event	Time	Rank	Time	Rank	Time	Rank
Michał Łubniewski	C1 200m	40.171	4 Q	39.733	2 FA	45.900	6
Tomasz Kaczor	C1 1000m	3:48.829	1 FA	BYE		3:57.953	1st place, gold medalist(s)
Mateusz Kamiński; Michał Kudła	C2-1000m	3:33.001	4 Q	3:34.029	1 FA	3:43.704	5
Paweł Kaczmarek	K1 200m	35.848	3 Q	35.399	6 FB	38.304	12
Rafał Rosolski	K1 1000m	3:29.902	2 Q	3:26.615	2 FA	3:37.311	9
Rafał Rosolski	K1 5000m	BYE				22:29.843	6
Martin Brzeziński; Bartosz Stabno	K2-1000m	3:13.872	6 Q	3:15.682	6	did not advance	
Przemysław Korsak; Norbert Kurczyński; Piotr Mazur; Dawid Putto	K4-500m	1:23.292	5 Q	1:21.874	5	did not advance	

Women

Athlete	Event	Heats		Semifinals		Finals	
Athlete	Event	Time	Rank	Time	Rank	Time	Rank
Dorota Borowska	C1 200m	48.951	1 FA	BYE		51.731	3rd place, bronze medalist(s)
Magda Stanny; Sylwia Szczerbińska	C2 500m	2:02.289	5 Q	2:01.196	1 FA	2:15.997	6
Marta Walczykiewicz	K1 200m	40.958	1 FA	BYE		42.408	3rd place, bronze medalist(s)
Anna Puławska	K1 500m	1:48.115	2 Q	1:49.796	1 FA	2:08.164	6
Małgorzata Puławska	K1 5000m	BYE				26:09.362	11
Helena Wiśniewska; Karolina Naja	K2 200m	38.965	2 FA	BYE		45.771	4
Justyna Iskrzycka; Katarzyna Kołodziejczyk	K2 500m	1:41.174	2 FA	BYE		1:44.541	5
Katarzyna Kołodziejczyk; Anna Puławska; Karolina Naja; Helena Wiśniewska	K4 500m	1:30.704	2 FA	BYE		1:42.851	3rd place, bronze medalist(s)

Qualification Legend: FA = Qualify to final (medal); FB = Qualify to final B (non-medal)

== Cycling ==
=== Road ===
Athlete	Event	Time	Rank
Monika Brzeźna	Road race	3:08:43	54
Małgorzata Jasińska	Road race	3:08:37	38
Marta Lach	Road race	3:08:24	27
Agnieszka Skalniak	Road race	3:08:24	33
Katarzyna Wilkos	Road race	3:08:13	14
Małgorzata Jasińska	Time trial	39:49.63	15
Katarzyna Wilkos	Time trial	40:29.41	19

=== Track ===
Sprint

Athlete	Event	Qualification		Round 1	Repechage 1	Round 2	Repechage 2	Round 3	Repechage 3	Quarterfinals	Semifinals	Finals	
Athlete	Event	Time Speed (km/h)	Rank	Opposition Time Speed (km/h)	Opposition Time Speed (km/h)	Opposition Time Speed (km/h)	Opposition Time Speed (km/h)	Opposition Time Speed (km/h)	Opposition Time Speed (km/h)	Opposition Time Speed (km/h)	Opposition Time Speed (km/h)	Opposition Time Speed (km/h)	Rank
Mateusz Rudyk	Men's sprint	9.700	3 Q	Omelchenko (AZE); W 10.974	BYE	Peralta (ESP); W 10.258	BYE	Yakushevskiy (RUS); W 10.226	BYE	Caleyron (FRA); W 2-1	Lavreysen (NED); L 0-2	Dmitriev (RUS); L 0-2	4
Rafał Sarnecki	Men's sprint	10.128	16 Q	Kelemen (CZE); W 10.505	BYE	Kenny (GBR); L 10.443	Szalontay (HUN); W 10.674	Dmitriev (RUS); L 10.252	Lendel (LTU); L 10.356	Did not advance			
Nikola Sibiak	Women's sprint	11.310	16 Q	Marchant (GBR); L 11.810	Basova (UKR); W 11.756	Shmeleva (RUS); L 11.770	Degrendele (BEL); L 11.691	Did not advance					
Aleksandra Tołomanow	Women's sprint	11.437	19 Q	Van Riessen (NED); L 11.958	Did not advance								

Team sprint

Athlete	Event	Qualification		Semifinals		Final	
Athlete	Event	Time Speed (km/h)	Rank	Opposition Time Speed (km/h)	Rank	Opposition Time Speed (km/h)	Rank
Mateusz Rudyk; Krzysztof Maksel; Maciej Bielecki; Rafał Sarnecki	Men's team sprint	44.092	7 Q	Great Britain (GBR); L 43.794	8	Did not advance	
Marlena Karwacka; Urszula Łoś	Women's team sprint	33.645	2 Q	Spain (ESP); W 33.409	3 QB	Netherlands (NED); L 33.393	4

Keirin

Athlete	Event	1st Round	Repechage	2nd Round	Final
Athlete	Event	Rank	Rank	Rank	Rank
Krzysztof Maksel	Men's keirin	2 Q	BYE	3 Q	4
Patryk Rajkowski	Men's keirin	6	3	Did not advance	
Urszula Łoś	Women's keirin	3	1 Q	3 Q	5
Marlena Karwacka	Women's keirin	6	2	Did not advance	

Time Trial

Athlete	Event	1st Round		Final	
Athlete	Event	Time	Rank	Time	Rank
Krzysztof Maksel	Men's 1 km time trial	1:01.185	3 Q	1:01.351	3rd place, bronze medalist(s)
Julia Jagodzińska	Women's 500 m time trial	35.052	11	Did not advance	
Nikola Sibiak	Women's 500 m time trial	35.366	12	Did not advance	

Omnium

Athlete	Event	Scratch race		Tempo race		Elimination race		Points race		Total points	Rank
Athlete	Event	Rank	Points	Rank	Points	Rank	Points	Rank	Points	Total points	Rank
Daniel Staniszewski	Men's omnium	1	40	6	30	4	34	6	22	126	3rd place, bronze medalist(s)
Katarzyna Pawłowska	Women's omnium	11	20	12	18	16	10	DNS		DNF	

Madison

Athlete	Event	Points	Laps	Rank
Szymon Krawczyk; Wojciech Pszczolarski	Men's madison	10	0	9
Nikol Płosaj; Karolina Karasiewicz	Women's madison	(-40)	0	11

Pursuit

Athlete	Event	Qualification		Final	
Athlete	Event	Time Speed (km/h)	Rank	Opposition Time Speed (km/h)	Rank
Szymon Krawczyk	Men's pursuit	4:17.894	3 QB	Imhof (SUI); L 4:19.220	4
Justyna Kaczkowska	Women's pursuit	3:40.320	6	Did not advance	
Karolina Karasiewicz	Women's pursuit	3:44.923	10	Did not advance	

Team pursuit

Athlete	Event	Qualification		Semifinals		Final	
Athlete	Event	Time Speed (km/h)	Rank	Opposition Time Speed (km/h)	Rank	Opposition Time Speed (km/h)	Rank
Daniel Staniszewski; Szymon Krawczyk; Damian Sławek; Filip Prokopyszyn	Men's team pursuit	4:02.061	5 Q	Ukraine (UKR); W 4:00.009	5	did not advance	
Nikol Płosaj; Karolina Karasiewicz; Katarzyna Pawłowska; Justyna Kaczkowska	Women's team pursuit	4:26.825	3 Q	Great Britain (GBR); L 4:26.867	3 QB	Belarus (BLR); W 4:25.906	3rd place, bronze medalist(s)

Endurance

Athlete	Event	Points Time	Rank
Damian Sławek	Men's points race	(-18)	15
Filip Prokopyszyn	Men's scratch	17:57	2nd place, silver medalist(s)
Nikol Płosaj	Women's points race	8	8
Justyna Kaczkowska	Women's scratch	13:17	4

== Gymnastics ==
=== Acrobatic ===
Athlete	Event	Exercise			Total	Rank
Athlete	Event	Balance	Dynamic	Combined	Total	Rank
Filip Bucki Dosir; Julia Fajfur	Mixed pairs all-around	DNS				
Filip Bucki Dosir; Julia Fajfur	Mixed pairs balance	—N/a			DNS	
Filip Bucki Dosir; Julia Fajfur	Mixed pairs dynamic	—N/a			DNS	

=== Artistic ===
Athlete	Event	Qualification								Final							
Athlete	Event	Apparatus						Total	Rank	Apparatus						Total	Rank
Athlete	Event	F	PH	R	V	PB	HB	Total	Rank	F	PH	R	V	PB	HB	Total	Rank
Łukasz Borkowski	Men's all-around	12.133	12.466	12.166	13.000	10.433	11.566	71.297	28	Did not advance							

Athlete	Event	Qualification						Final					
Athlete	Event	Apparatus				Total	Rank	Apparatus				Total	Rank
Athlete	Event	V	UB	BB	F	Total	Rank	V	UB	BB	F	Total	Rank
Gabriela Janik	Women's all-around	13.633	12.733	12.100	12.200	50.533	13 Q	13.600	11.533	12.500	12.400	50.033	13
Gabriela Janik	Women's vault	13.633	—N/a	—N/a	—N/a	13.633	5 Q	13.699	—N/a	—N/a	—N/a	13.699	4

=== Trampoline ===
Athlete	Event	Qualification		Final	
Athlete	Event	Score	Rank	Score	Rank
Łukasz Jaworski	Men's individual	106.775	11	did not advance	
Artur Zakrzewski	Men's individual	57.135	22	did not advance	
Łukasz Jaworski; Artur Zakrzewski	Men's synchronized	—N/a		51.450	1st place, gold medalist(s)

== Judo ==
Athlete	Event	Round of 32	Round of 16	Quarterfinals	Semifinals	Repechage	Final / BM	
Athlete	Event	Opposition Result	Opposition Result	Opposition Result	Opposition Result	Opposition Result	Opposition Result	Rank
Patryk Wawrzyczek	Men's 66 kg	Gaitero Martin (ESP); L 0 – 10	Did not advance					
Wiktor Mrówczyński	Men's 73 kg	Szabo (HUN); L 01 – 12	Did not advance					
Damian Stępień	Men's 81 kg	Koç (TUR); W 10 – 00	De Vit (NED); L 01 – 10	Did not advance				
Damian Szwarnowiecki	Men's 81 kg	Aristos (CYP); W 10 – 01	Egutidze (NED); L 01 – 11	Did not advance				
Rafał Kozłowski	Men's 90 kg	Kochman (ISR); L 00 – 10	Did not advance					
Piotr Kuczera	Men's 90 kg	Kukojl (SRB); L 01 – 101	Did not advance					
Iwo Baraniewski	Men's 100 kg	Sviryd (BLR); L 01 – 101	Did not advance					
Maciej Sarnacki	Men's +100 kg	BYE	Khammo (UKR); W 1s2 – 0s3	Tushishvili (GEO); L 00 – 10	BYE	Hegyi (AUT); L 0s2 – 11s2	Did not advance	7
Agata Perenc	Women's 52 kg	Lopez Sheriff (ESP); W 1s1 – 0	Szabo (HUN); W 1 – 0s1	Mammadaliyeva (AZE); W 10s1 – 0s1	Kuziutina (RUS); L 0s1 – 11s1	BYE	Giles (GBR); L 1s1 – 10	5
Karolina Pieńkowska	Women's 52 kg	Florian (AZE); W 10s1 – 1s1	Perez Box (ESP); W 1 – 0s1	Kelmendi (KOS); L 0s2 – 10	BYE	Giles (GBR); L 0s1 – 10s1	Did not advance	7
Anna Borowska	Women's 57 kg	BYE	Filzmoser (AUT); W 1 – 0s1	Monteiro (POR); L 0 – 1s2	BYE	Starke (GER); L 1 – 10s1	Did not advance	7
Julia Kowalczyk	Women's 57 kg	Mezhetskaia (RUS); L 0s1 – 10s1	Did not advance					
Agata Ozdoba-Błach	Women's 63 kg	BYE	Sharir (ISR); W 10s1 – 0s3	Centracchio (ITA); L 0s3 – 10s1	BYE	Trajdos (GER); L 0s3 – 10s2	Did not advance	7
Karolina Tałach	Women's 63 kg	Renshall (GBR); W 10 – 0s1	Ludvik (SLO); W 10s1 – 0s3	Agbegnenou (FRA); L 0 – 10	BYE	Davydova (RUS); W 10s2 – 0s2	Centracchio (ITA); L 0s3 – 10s2	5
Daria Pogorzelec	Women's 70 kg	Sook (DEN); W 10s1 – 0s3	Paissoni (ITA); W 10s2 – 0s3	Polleres (AUT); W 11 – 1s3	Pinot (FRA); L 0s2 – 10	BYE	Matic (CRO); L 1 – 10	5
Beata Pacut	Women's 78 kg	BYE	Malzahn (GER); L0 – 10	Did not advance				
Anna Borowska; Beata Pacut; Daria Pogorzelec; Wiktor Mrówczyński; Maciej Sarnacki; Piotr Kuczera	Mixed team	BYE	Serbia (SRB); L 3–4	Did not advance				

== Karate ==
=== Elimination round ===
==== Group A ====
Athlete	Pld	W	D	L	Points		
Athlete	Pld	W	D	L	GF	GA	Diff
Jana Bitsch (GER)	3	1	2	0	5	2	3
Jennifer Warling (LUX)	3	1	2	0	4	0	4
Dorota Banaszczyk (POL)	3	1	2	0	4	1	3
Irina Sharykhina (BLR)	3	0	0	3	3	13	(-10)

	Score	
Irina Sharykhina (BLR)	1-4	Dorota Banaszczyk (POL)
Jennifer Warling (LUX)	0-0	Dorota Banaszczyk (POL)
Dorota Banaszczyk (POL)	0-0	Jana Bitsch (GER)

== Sambo ==
Athlete	Event	Quarterfinal	Semifinal	Repechage	Final/BM	Rank
Magdalena Jarkowska	68 kg	Budeanu (MDA); L 1–2	BYE	Namazava (BLR); L 1–1	Did not advance	7

== Shooting ==
Men

Athlete	Event	Qualification		Final	
Athlete	Event	Points	Rank	Points	Rank
Tomasz Bartnik	10 m air rifle	625.3	17	did not advance	
Tomasz Bartnik	50 m rifle three positions	1176	5 Q	404.3	7
Piotr Daniluk	10 m air pistol	577	12	did not advance	
Piotr Daniluk	25 m rapid fire pistol	567	20	did not advance	
Piotr Kowalczyk	Trap	107	26	did not advance	
Oskar Miliwek	25 m rapid fire pistol	573	10	did not advance	
Jakub Werys	Skeet	111	22	did not advance	
Szymon Wojtyna	10 m air pistol	565	33	did not advance	

Women

Athlete	Event	Qualification		Final	
Athlete	Event	Points	Rank	Points	Rank
Beata Bartków-Kwiatkowska	10 m air pistol	569	19	did not advance	
Sandra Bernal	Trap	100	22	did not advance	
Klaudia Breś	10 m air pistol	578	1 Q	155.5	6
Klaudia Breś	25 m pistol	579	14	did not advance	
Aleksandra Jarmolińska	Skeet	112	10	did not advance	
Katarzyna Komorowska	10 m air rifle	622.2	30	did not advance	
Katarzyna Komorowska	50 m rifle three positions	1152	24	did not advance	
Agnieszka Nagay	10 m air rifle	621.1	32	did not advance	
Agnieszka Nagay	50 m rifle three positions	1156	17	did not advance	
Natalia Szamrej	Skeet	102	28	did not advance	
Joanna Tomala	25 m pistol	565	29	did not advance	

Mixed team

Athlete	Event	Qualification				Final / BM	
Athlete	Event	Stage 1		Stage 2		Final / BM	
Athlete	Event	Points	Rank	Points	Rank	Opposition Result	Rank
Katarzyna Komorowska; Tomasz Bartnik	10 m air rifle	621.5	18	Did not advance			
Agnieszka Nagay; Tomasz Bartnik	50 m rifle prone	412.0	9	Did not advance			
Beata Bartków-Kwiatkowska; Oskar Miliwek	10 m air pistol	569	12	Did not advance			
Klaudia Breś; Szymon Wojtyna	10 m air pistol	567	17	Did not advance			
Joanna Tomala; Oskar Miliwek	25 m standard pistol	541	12	Did not advance			
Klaudia Breś; Piotr Daniluk	25 m standard pistol	555	3 Q	384.3	5	Did not advance	
Sandra Bernal; Piotr Kowalczyk	Trap	128	11	Did not advance			
Aleksandra Jarmolińska; Jakub Werys	Skeet	136	10	Did not advance			

== Table tennis ==
Athlete	Event	Round 1	Round 2	Round of 16	Quarterfinals	Semifinals	Final / BM	
Athlete	Event	Opposition Score	Opposition Score	Opposition Score	Opposition Score	Opposition Score	Opposition Score	Rank
Marek Badowski	Men's singles	BYE	Shibaev (RUS); L 0–4	Did not advance				
Jakub Dyjas	Men's singles	BYE	Tromer (NED); W 4–3	Boll (GER); L 1–4	Did not advance			
Li Qian	Women's singles	BYE		Noskova (RUS); W 4–0	Solja (GER); L 3–4	Did not advance		
Natalia Partyka	Women's singles	BYE	Todorović (SRB); W 4–1	Ekholm (SWE); L 2–4	Did not advance			
Jakub Dyjas; Natalia Partyka	Mixed doubles	—N/a		Gasnier / Flore (FRA); L 2–3	Did not advance			
Natalia Bajor; Li Qian; Natalia Partyka	Women's team	—N/a		Russia; W 3–0	Austria; W 3–1	Germany; L 2–3	Hungary; W 3–2	3rd place, bronze medalist(s)

== Wrestling ==
Men's freestyle

Athlete	Event	1/8 final	Quarterfinal	Semifinal	Repechage 1	Repechage 2	Final/BM	Rank
Krzysztof Bieńkowski	65 kg	Mukhtarov (FRA); W 4–2	Chakaev (RUS); L 0–7	Did not advance				
Magomedmurad Gadzhiev	74 kg	Kirov (BUL); W 2–0	Nurykau (BLR); L 3–4	Did not advance				
Zbigniew Baranowski	86 kg	Dimitrov (BUL); W 11–0	Kurugliev (RUS); L 3–4	Did not advance	Amine (SMR); L 3–4	Did not advance		
Radosław Baran	97 kg	Gadzhiyev (AZE); L 0–8	Did not advance		Odikadze (GEO); L 2–3	Did not advance		
Robert Baran	125 kg	Khotsianivskyi (UKR); L 0–6	Did not advance					

Men's Greco-Roman

Athlete	Event	1/8 final	Quarterfinal	Semifinal	Repechage 1	Repechage 2	Final/BM	Rank
Mateusz Bernatek	67 kg	Basar (TUR); L 5–7	Did not advance					
Edgar Babayan	77 kg	Maksimovic (SRB); L 1–3	Did not advance					
Arkadiusz Kułynycz	87 kg	Burduja (MDA); W 3-5 F	Beleniuk (UKR); L 1-9	Did not advance	BYE	Manukyan (ARM); W 3-3	Kuliyeu (BLR); W 7-1	3rd place, bronze medalist(s)
Rafał Płowiec	130 kg	Hryshchanka (BLR); L 0-3	Did not advance		BYE	Kuchmii (UKR); L 1-7	Did not advance	

Women's Freestyle

Athlete	Event	1/8 final	Quarterfinal	Semifinal	Repechage 1	Repechage 2	Final/BM	Rank
Anna Łukasiak	50 kg	Liuzzi (ITA); W 8–0	Stadnik (AZE); L 0–10	Did not advance	BYE		Demirhan (TUR); L 2–6	5
Paula Kozłow	53 kg	Orshush (RUS); L 0–10	Did not advance					
Jowita Wrzesień	57 kg	Kurachkina (BLR); L 0–11	Did not advance		BYE	Bullen (NOR); L 1–7	Did not advance	7
Katarzyna Mądrowska	62 kg	Douarre (FRA); W 11–0	Gambarova (AZE); L 0–9	Did not advance	BYE	Manzke (GER); W 3–2	Incze (ROU); L 2–8	5
Agnieszka Wieszczek-Kordus	68 kg	Hanzlickova (CZE); W 5–2	Cherkasova (UKR); L 2–12	Did not advance				
Daria Osocka	76 kg	Nelthorpe (GBR); L 5–2 F	Did not advance					
