= Irine Leonidze =

Georgian judoka and sambist

Personal information
- Born: 26 December 1984 (age 41)
- Occupations: Judoka, Sambist

Sport
- Country: Georgia
- Sport: Judo, Sambo
- Weight class: +78 kg

Achievements and titles
- World Champ.: R32 (2007)
- European Champ.: 5th (2009)
Medal record
Representing Georgia
Women's judo
IJF Grand Prix
Gold medal – first place	2012 Baku	+78 kg
Women's sambo
World Championship
Bronze medal – third place	2012 Minsk	‍–‍80 kg
Bronze medal – third place	2013 Saint Petersburg	+80 kg
Bronze medal – third place	2015 Cassablanca	‍–‍80 kg
European Championship
Silver medal – second place	2016 Kazan	‍–‍80 kg
Silver medal – second place	2018 Athens	‍–‍80 kg
Bronze medal – third place	2012 Minsk	‍–‍80 kg
Bronze medal – third place	2015 Zagreb	+80 kg

Profile at external databases
- IJF: 10751
- JudoInside.com: 39635
- Updated on 1 July 2024

Irine Leonidze (Georgian: ირინე ლეონიძე; born 26 December 1984) is a Georgian former sambo practitioner and judoka.

== Career ==
As judoka she became champion of 2012 Judo Grand Prix Baku, beaten Croatian Ivana Maranić.

As a sambo practitioner, she has competed in -80 kg and +80 kg categories. At 2012 she has won bronze medal at European Sambo Championships, she has beaten Belarusian Yelizaveta Maiseyenka, then lost to Italian Miranda Giambelli and continued to repechage against Romanian Maria Elena Popescu. In final meeting for bronze medal, she has won against Russian Elena Khakimova.
