= Lithuania at the 2019 European Games =

- IOC code: LTU
- NOC: Lithuanian National Olympic Committee
- Website: www.ltok.lt

in Minsk, Belarus 21 – 30 June
- Competitors: 72 in 13 sports
- Medals Ranked 29th: Gold 2 Silver 1 Bronze 0 Total 3

European Games appearances (overview)
- 2015; 2019; 2023; 2027

Lithuania have sent a 131 person delegation to the 2019 European Games, in Minsk, Belarus to compete in 13 sports disciplines. The LTeam consisted of 42 sportsmen and 31 sportswomen, 30 coaches, 4 team leaders, 11 medical personnel, 3 delegation leaders and 10 other personnel.

== Medalists ==
Medal	Name	Sport	Event	Date
Gold	Robert Tvorogal	Gymnastics	Artistic Gymnastics, Horizontal Bar	30 June
Gold	Simona Krupeckaitė	Cycling	Track Cycling, Keirin	28 June
Silver	Simona Krupeckaitė; Miglė Marozaitė	Cycling	Track Cycling, Team Sprint	27 June

== Archery ==
Recurve

Athlete	Event	Ranking round		Round of 64	Round of 32	Round of 16	Quarterfinals	Semifinals	Final / BM	
Athlete	Event	Score	Seed	Opposition Score	Opposition Score	Opposition Score	Opposition Score	Opposition Score	Opposition Score	Rank
Inga Timinskienė	Women's individual	594	40	Aktuna (TUR); L 5-6						

== Athletics ==
Men's

- Men's 100 m: Kostas Skrabulis
- Men's 110 m Hurdles: Rapolas Saulius
- Men's 110 m Hurdles: Martynas Vrašinskas
- Men's High Jump: Adrijus Glebauskas
- Men's 4x400 m: Artūras Janauskas
- Men's 4x400 m: Rokas Pacevičius
- Men's Universal Relay: Benediktas Mickus
- Men's Universal Relay: Gediminas Truskauskas
- Men's Relay: Mindaugas Striokas

Women's

- Women's 100 m: Karolina Deliautaitė
- Women's 100 m: Akvilė Andriukaitytė
- Women's 100 m Hurdles: Rasa Mažeikaitė
- Women's Javelin: Liveta Jasiūnaitė
- Women's Long Jump: Jogailė Petrokaitė
- Women's Long Jump: Augustė Ragalaitė
- Women's 4x400 m: Erika Krūminaitė
- Women's 4x400 m: Modesta Justė Morauskaitė
- Women's Universal Relay: Eglė Balčiūnaitė
- Women's Universal Relay: Eva Misiūnaitė
- Women's Relay: Gabija Galvydytė
- Women's Relay: Monika Elenska

== Badminton ==
Athletes	Event	Group stage				Round of 16	Quarterfinals	Semifinals	Finals	Rank
Athletes	Event	Opposition Score	Opposition Score	Opposition Score	Rank	Opposition Score	Opposition Score	Opposition Score	Opposition Score	Rank
Vytautė Fomkinaitė	Women's singles	Batomene (FRA); L (12-21, 16-21)	Gilmour (GBR); L (14-21, 11-21)	Wiborg (NOR); W (21-10, 21-13)	3	did not advance				
Vytautė Fomkinaitė; Gerda Voitechovskaja	Women's doubles	Bukoviczki / Gonda (HUN); L (13-21, 21-14, 19-21)	Birch / Smith (GBR); L (9-21, 15-21)	Fruergaard / Thygesen (DEN); L (10-21, 7-21)	4	—	did not advance			

== Basketball ==
- Men's 3x3 Team: Medas Kuprijanovas, Paulius Semaška, Mintautas Bulanovas, Gytis Radzevičius

== Boxing ==
- Men's 60 kg - Edgaras Skurdelis
- Men's 75 kg - Vytautas Balsys
- Men's over 91 kg - Mantas Valavičius

== Canoeing ==
Men's:

- C-1 1000 m: Vadim Korobov
- K-2 1000 m: Ričardas Nekriošius
- K-2 1000 m: Andrejus Olijnikas
- K-1 200 m: Artūras Seja
- C-2 1000 m; C-1 200 m: Henrikas Žustautas
- C-2 1000 m: Ilja Davidovskij

Women's:

- C-1 200 m: Rūta Dagytė

== Cycling ==
Men's:

- Vasilijus Lendel - sprint
- Svajūnas Jonauskas - keirin
- Gediminas Bagdonas - road race, time trial
- Ramūnas Navardauskas - road race
- Justas Beniušis - road race
- Venantas Lašinis - road race
- Rojus Adomaitis - road race

Women's:

- Simona Krupeckaitė - sprint, team sprint, keirin, 500 m
- Miglė Marozaitė - sprint, team sprint, keirin, 500 m
- Olivija Baleišytė - scratch, team, omnium, madison
- Viktorija Šumskytė - madison, scratch, team, omnium
- Rasa Leleivytė - road race
- Silvija Pacevičienė - road race, time trial

== Gymnastics ==
- Apparatus; all-round: Robert Tvorogal

== Judo ==
- Men's -100 kg - Karolis Bauža
- Men's -73 kg - Kęstutis Vitkauskas
- Andrejus Klokovas
- Women's +78 kg - Sandra Jablonskytė
- Women's +78 kg - Santa Pakenytė

== Karate ==
No participants this year.

== Sambo ==
- Men's 52 kg - Gintaras Katkus
- Women's +80 kg - Karina Stefanovič

== Shooting ==
- 10 m Women's Air Pistol: Gabrielė Rankelytė, Jakaterina Ždanova
- 25 m Women's pistol: Gabrielė Rankelytė, Jakaterina Ždanova
- Women's Skeet: Alisa Bogdanova
- 10 m Men's Air Rifle: Karolis Girulis
- Men's Skeet: Ronaldas Račinskas

== Table tennis ==
Athlete	Event	Round 1	Round 2	Round 3	Round 4	Quarterfinal	Semifinal	Final / BM	
Athlete	Event	Opposition Result	Opposition Result	Opposition Result	Opposition Result	Opposition Result	Opposition Result	Opposition Result	Rank
Medardas Stankevičius	Men's singles	Bye	Tokič (SLO); L 2–4	did not advance					

== Wrestling ==
Men's freestyle

Athlete	Event	Qualification	Quarterfinal	Semifinal	Repechage 1	Final / BM	
Athlete	Event	Opposition Result	Opposition Result	Opposition Result	Opposition Result	Opposition Result	Rank
Lukas Krasauskas	−97 kg	Nurov (MKD); L 0-10	did not advance				

Men's Greco-Roman

Athlete	Event	Qualification	Quarterfinal	Semifinal	Repechage 1	Final / BM	
Athlete	Event	Opposition Result	Opposition Result	Opposition Result	Opposition Result	Opposition Result	Rank
Eividas Stankevičius	−87 kg	Kuliyeu (BLR); L 0–9	did not advance				
Romas Fridrikas	−130 kg	Kajaia (GEO); L 0-4	did not advance		Shariati (AZE); L 1–3	did not advance	

Women's freestyle

Athlete	Event	Qualification	Quarterfinal	Semifinal	Repechage 1	Final / BM	
Athlete	Event	Opposition Result	Opposition Result	Opposition Result	Opposition Result	Opposition Result	Rank
Auksė Rutkauskaitė	−57 kg	Bullen (NOR); L 0-8 ^{F}	did not advance				
Kornelija Zaicevaitė	−62 kg	Tuğcu (TUR); L 0–5	did not advance				
Danutė Domikaitytė	−68 kg	Bye	Maryshuk (BLR); W 2-2	Grigorjeva (LAT); L 3–10	Bye	Georgieva (BUL); L 1-4	5
Kamilė Gaučaitė	−76 kg	Kuenz (AUT); L 0-10	did not advance				
