= Gymnastics at the 2018 Mediterranean Games – Women's rhythmic individual all-around =

Women's individual all-around at the 2018 Mediterranean Games
- Venue: Pavelló Olímpic de Reus
- Location: Reus
- Dates: 29–30 June
- Competitors: 26 from 11 nations
- Winning score: 71.150

Medalists
gold medal	Alexandra Agiurgiuculese	Italy
silver medal	Eleni Kelaiditi	Greece
bronze medal	Milena Baldassarri	Italy

The Women's rhythmic individual all-around competition at the 2018 Mediterranean Games was held at the Pavelló Olímpic de Reus in Reus from 29 to 30 June.

== Competition format ==
The competition consisted of a qualification round and a final round. The top ten gymnasts in the qualification round advance to the final round. In each round, the gymnasts perform four routines (ball, hoop, clubs, and ribbon), with the scores added to give a total.

== Schedule ==
All times are Central European Summer Time (UTC+2)

Date	Time	Round
Friday, 29 June 2018	11:10	Qualification
Saturday, 30 June 2018	11:10	Final

== Qualification ==
Rank	Name	Hoop (rhythmic gymnastics)	Ball (rhythmic gymnastics)	Clubs (rhythmic gymnastics)	Ribbon (rhythmic gymnastics)	Total	Notes
1	Alexandra Agiurgiuculese (ITA)	17.750	18.550	18.800	16.300	71.400	Q
2	Milena Baldassarri (ITA)	16.900	18.150	18.050	15.750	68.850	Q
3	Eleni Kelaiditi (GRE)	16.300	17.550	18.200	15.800	67.850	Q
4	Alessia Russo (ITA)	16.000	15.750	16.700	13.300	61.750	
5	Polina Berezina (ESP)	14.350	15.350	15.700	13.400	58.800	Q
6	Sara Llana (ESP)	13.850	12.950	15.250	13.850	55.900	Q
7	Aleksandra Podgoršek (SLO)	13.850	14.750	13.850	13.200	55.650	Q
8	Viktoria Skittidi (CYP)	13.850	14.800	13.200	12.700	54.550	Q
9	Laura Sales (POR)	14.150	14.350	14.850	11.100	54.450	Q
10	Kamelya Tuncel (TUR)	13.650	11.150	13.100	12.600	50.500	Q
11	Derya Demirörs (TUR)	12.700	14.350	14.600	8.300	49.950	Q
12	Mariam Selim (EGY)	13.450	12.450	12.200	10.200	48.300	
13	Maria Dervisi (GRE)	12.250	12.200	13.350	10.300	48.100	
14	Habiba Marzouk (EGY)	11.200	12.200	12.550	11.600	47.500	
15	Nastasija Gvozdić (SRB)	12.450	11.900	12.100	10.250	46.700	
16	Anja Tomažin (SLO)	9.800	12.200	11.900	9.050	42.950	
17	Maria Canilhas (POR)	9.100	10.100	11.250	11.400	41.850	
18	Eleni Ellina (CYP)	10.450	10.150	9.750	8.600	38.950	
19	Zeynep Kırlı (TUR)	10.800	11.100	10.150	6.550	38.600	
20	Judith Flinch (AND)	9.800	10.850	9.450	6.750	36.850	
21	Andrea Ramos (AND)	9.300	6.850	9.650	7.450	33.250	
22	Jèssica Pereira (AND)	8.550	3.400	9.300	7.900	29.150	
23	Azra Kadrić (BIH)	8.100	6.750	7.300	5.050	27.200	
24	Sara Ažman (BIH)	7.300	7.500	7.800	3.350	25.950	
25	Ajša Mujačić (BIH)	6.300	4.850	6.550	5.250	22.950	
	Diamanto Evripidou (CYP)	13.950	14.050	10.850	DNS	DNF	

Alessia Russo of Italy finished in fourth position but did not qualify because a country can only enter two athletes in final.

== Final ==
Rank	Name	Hoop (rhythmic gymnastics)	Ball (rhythmic gymnastics)	Clubs (rhythmic gymnastics)	Ribbon (rhythmic gymnastics)	Total
1st place, gold medalist(s)	Alexandra Agiurgiuculese (ITA)	18.400	18.600	17.450	16.700	71.150
2nd place, silver medalist(s)	Eleni Kelaiditi (GRE)	17.100	17.950	18.300	17.400	70.750
3rd place, bronze medalist(s)	Milena Baldassarri (ITA)	18.500	18.650	16.450	17.050	70.650
4	Polina Berezina (ESP)	14.650	15.250	14.900	14.250	59.050
5	Laura Sales (POR)	15.650	14.900	14.850	13.350	58.750
6	Viktoria Skittidi (CYP)	15.400	14.600	15.400	13.150	58.550
7	Sara Llana (ESP)	15.500	15.050	13.000	13.600	57.150
8	Aleksandra Podgoršek (SLO)	14.950	14.050	14.500	11.800	55.300
9	Kamelya Tuncel (TUR)	14.500	12.800	14.700	12.500	54.500
10	Derya Demirörs (TUR)	14.400	10.250	14.950	13.000	52.600
