= Gymnastics at the 2019 European Games – Women's rhythmic individual hoop =

Women's rhythmic individual hoop at the 2019 European Games
- Venue: Minsk-Arena
- Date: 23 June
- Competitors: 6 from 6 nations
- Winning score: 22.850

Medalists
| gold medal | Dina Averina | Russia |
| silver medal | Katsiaryna Halkina | Belarus |
| bronze medal | Vlada Nikolchenko | Ukraine |

The women's rhythmic individual hoop competition at the 2019 European Games was held at the Minsk-Arena on 23 June 2019.

== Qualification ==
The top six gymnasts advanced to the final.

| Rank | Gymnast | D Score | E Score | Pen. | Total | Qualification |
|---|---|---|---|---|---|---|
| 1 | Vlada Nikolchenko (UKR) | 14.100 | 8.300 | | 22.400 | Q |
| 2 | Linoy Ashram (ISR) | 13.000 | 8.950 | | 21.950 | Q |
| 3 | Katsiaryna Halkina (BLR) | 12.500 | 9.300 | | 21.800 | Q |
| 4 | Dina Averina (RUS) | 12.900 | 8.400 | | 21.300 | Q |
| 5 | Eleni Kelaiditi (GRE) | 12.500 | 7.925 | | 20.425 | Q |
| 6 | Alexandra Agiurgiuculese (ITA) | 11.700 | 8.300 | | 20.000 | Q |
| 7 | Nicol Ruprecht (AUT) | 12.000 | 7.900 | | 19.900 | R1 |
| 8 | Salome Pazhava (GEO) | 11.600 | 8.050 | | 19.650 | R2 |
| 9 | Fanni Pigniczki (HUN) | 11.300 | 7.850 | | 19.150 | |
| 10 | Zohra Aghamirova (AZE) | 11.500 | 7.600 | | 19.100 | |
| 11 | Katrin Taseva (BUL) | 11.100 | 7.700 | | 18.800 | |
| 12 | Andreea Verdeș (ROU) | 10.900 | 7.550 | | 18.450 | |

== Final ==
| Rank | Gymnast | D Score | E Score | Pen. | Total |
|---|---|---|---|---|---|
| 1st place, gold medalist(s) | Dina Averina (RUS) | 13.900 | 8.950 | | 22.850 |
| 2nd place, silver medalist(s) | Katsiaryna Halkina (BLR) | 12.700 | 9.050 | | 21.750 |
| 3rd place, bronze medalist(s) | Vlada Nikolchenko (UKR) | 13.200 | 8.250 | | 21.450 |
| 4 | Eleni Kelaiditi (GRE) | 10.900 | 7.850 | | 18.750 |
| 5 | Alexandra Agiurgiuculese (ITA) | 10.700 | 7.250 | –0.300 | 17.650 |
| 6 | Linoy Ashram (ISR) | 10.700 | 5.550 | –0.350 | 15.900 |
