= Gymnastics at the 2019 European Games – Women's rhythmic individual ball =

Women's rhythmic individual ball at the 2019 European Games
- Venue: Minsk-Arena
- Date: 23 June
- Competitors: 6 from 6 nations
- Winning score: 22.500

Medalists
gold medal	Linoy Ashram	Israel
silver medal	Katrin Taseva	Bulgaria
bronze medal	Dina Averina	Russia

The women's rhythmic individual ball competition at the 2019 European Games was held at the Minsk-Arena on 23 June 2019.

== Qualification ==
The top six gymnasts advanced to the final.

Rank	Gymnast	D Score	E Score	Pen.	Total	Qualification
1	Dina Averina (RUS)	14.500	9.100		23.600	Q
2	Linoy Ashram (ISR)	13.100	8.900		22.000	Q
3	Katrin Taseva (BUL)	12.500	8.250		20.750	Q
4	Alexandra Agiurgiuculese (ITA)	11.200	8.500		19.750	Q
5	Eleni Kelaiditi (GRE)	11.300	7.600		18.900	Q
6	Katsiaryna Halkina (BLR)	10.600	7.300		17.900	Q
7	Zohra Aghamirova (AZE)	10.500	7.350		17.850	R1
8	Salome Pazhava (GEO)	10.500	7.250		17.750	R2
9	Vlada Nikolchenko (UKR)	11.600	6.150		17.750	
10	Fanni Pigniczki (HUN)	10.800	6.550	–0.300	17.050	
11	Andreea Verdeș (ROU)	10.200	6.600		16.800	
12	Nicol Ruprecht (AUT)	10.100	6.475	–0.300	16.275	

== Final ==
Rank	Gymnast	D Score	E Score	Pen.	Total
1st place, gold medalist(s)	Linoy Ashram (ISR)	13.500	9.000		22.500
2nd place, silver medalist(s)	Katrin Taseva (BUL)	12.900	8.500		21.400
3rd place, bronze medalist(s)	Dina Averina (RUS)	13.600	7.700		21.300
4	Katsiaryna Halkina (BLR)	11.800	9.250		21.050
5	Eleni Kelaiditi (GRE)	11.500	7.900		19.400
6	Alexandra Agiurgiuculese (ITA)	11.600	7.400		19.000
