= Gymnastics at the 2019 European Games – Women's rhythmic individual ribbon =

Women's rhythmic individual ribbon at the 2019 European Games
- Venue: Minsk-Arena
- Date: 23 June
- Competitors: 6 from 6 nations
- Winning score: 21.350

Medalists
gold medal	Dina Averina	Russia
silver medal	Linoy Ashram	Israel
bronze medal	Katrin Taseva	Bulgaria

The women's rhythmic individual ribbon competition at the 2019 European Games was held at the Minsk-Arena on 23 June 2019.

== Qualification ==
The top six gymnasts advanced to the final.

Rank	Gymnast	D Score	E Score	Pen.	Total	Qualification
1	Dina Averina (RUS)	11.400	8.650		20.050	Q
2	Alexandra Agiurgiuculese (ITA)	10.500	8.150		18.650	Q
3	Katsiaryna Halkina (BLR)	10.300	8.100		18.400	Q
4	Andreea Verdeș (ROU)	9.700	8.050		17.750	Q
5	Katrin Taseva (BUL)	10.200	7.400		17.600	Q
6	Linoy Ashram (ISR)	10.900	7.150	–0.600	17.450	Q
7	Nicol Ruprecht (AUT)	9.700	7.175		16.875	R1
8	Eleni Kelaiditi (GRE)	9.500	6.800		16.300	R2
9	Salome Pazhava (GEO)	9.900	6.700	–0.300	16.300	
10	Zohra Aghamirova (AZE)	9.200	7.025		16.225	
11	Vlada Nikolchenko (UKR)	9.700	6.400		16.100	
12	Fanni Pigniczki (HUN)	8.600	6.450		15.050	

== Final ==
Rank	Gymnast	D Score	E Score	Pen.	Total
1st place, gold medalist(s)	Dina Averina (RUS)	12.400	8.950		21.350
2nd place, silver medalist(s)	Linoy Ashram (ISR)	12.100	9.000		21.100
3rd place, bronze medalist(s)	Katrin Taseva (BUL)	11.900	8.600	–0.050	20.450
4	Katsiaryna Halkina (BLR)	10.700	8.700		19.400
5	Andreea Verdeș (ROU)	10.200	7.900		18.100
6	Alexandra Agiurgiuculese (ITA)	10.100	7.800		17.900
