= Gymnastics at the 2019 European Games – Women's rhythmic individual all-around =

Women's rhythmic individual all-around at the 2019 European Games
- Venue: Minsk-Arena
- Date: 22 June
- Competitors: 12 from 12 nations
- Winning score: 87.750

Medalists
gold medal	Dina Averina	Russia
silver medal	Linoy Ashram	Israel
bronze medal	Katsiaryna Halkina	Belarus

The women's rhythmic individual all-around competition at the 2019 European Games was held at the Minsk-Arena on 22 June 2019.

== Results ==
Rank	Gymnast	Hoop (rhythmic gymnastics)	Ball (rhythmic gymnastics)	Clubs (rhythmic gymnastics)	Ribbon (rhythmic gymnastics)	Total
1st place, gold medalist(s)	Dina Averina (RUS)	21.300	23.600	22.800	20.050	87.750
2nd place, silver medalist(s)	Linoy Ashram (ISR)	21.950	22.000	23.300	17.450	84.700
3rd place, bronze medalist(s)	Katsiaryna Halkina (BLR)	21.800	17.900	21.200	18.400	79.300
4	Alexandra Agiurgiuculese (ITA)	20.000	19.700	19.600	18.650	77.950
5	Vlada Nikolchenko (UKR)	22.400	17.750	21.625	16.100	77.875
6	Katrin Taseva (BUL)	18.800	20.750	20.100	17.600	77.250
7	Eleni Kelaiditi (GRE)	20.425	18.900	18.750	16.300	74.375
8	Zohra Aghamirova (AZE)	19.100	17.850	19.225	16.225	72.400
9	Andreea Verdes (ROU)	18.450	16.800	18.950	17.750	71.950
10	Salome Pazhava (GEO)	19.650	17.750	18.250	16.300	71.950
11	Nicol Ruprecht (AUT)	19.900	16.275	16.950	16.875	70.000
12	Fanni Pigniczki (HUN)	19.150	17.050	14.600	15.050	65.850
