= Cycling at the 2019 European Games – Men's scratch =

Men's scratch at the 2019 European Games
- Venue: Minsk Velodrome
- Date: 27 June
- Competitors: 17 from 17 nations

Medalists
| gold medal | Christos Volikakis | Greece |
| silver medal | Filip Prokopyszyn | Poland |
| bronze medal | Yauheni Karaliok | Belarus |

The men's scratch at the 2019 European Games was held at the Minsk Velodrome on 27 June 2019.

== Results ==
First rider across the line without a net lap loss wins.

| Rank | Name | Nation | Laps down |
|---|---|---|---|
| 1st place, gold medalist(s) | Christos Volikakis | Greece | |
| 2nd place, silver medalist(s) | Filip Prokopyszyn | Poland | |
| 3rd place, bronze medalist(s) | Yauheni Karaliok | Belarus | |
| 4 | Felix English | Ireland | |
| 5 | Jules Hesters | Belgium | |
| 6 | Roy Eefting | Netherlands | |
| 7 | Tristan Marguet | Switzerland | |
| 8 | Stefano Moro | Italy | |
| 9 | Dmitrii Mukhomediarov | Russia | |
| 10 | Daniel Babor | Czech Republic | |
| 11 | Krisztián Lovassy | Hungary | |
| 12 | Volodymyr Dzhus | Ukraine | |
| 13 | Óscar Pelegrí | Spain | |
| 14 | Rui Oliveira | Portugal | |
| 15 | Andreas Müller | Austria | |
| 16 | Edgar Stepanyan | Armenia | –1 |
| | Štefan Michalička | Slovakia | DNF |
