= Gymnastics at the 2019 European Games – Women's rhythmic individual clubs =

Women's rhythmic individual clubs at the 2019 European Games
- Venue: Minsk-Arena
- Date: 23 June
- Competitors: 6 from 6 nations
- Winning score: 22.700

Medalists
gold medal	Linoy Ashram	Israel
silver medal	Dina Averina	Russia
bronze medal	Vlada Nikolchenko	Ukraine

The women's rhythmic individual clubs competition at the 2019 European Games was held at the Minsk-Arena on 23 June 2019.

== Qualification ==
The top six gymnasts advanced to the final.

Rank	Gymnast	D Score	E Score	Pen.	Total	Qualification
1	Linoy Ashram (ISR)	14.100	9.200		23.300	Q
2	Dina Averina (RUS)	14.400	8.400		22.800	Q
3	Vlada Nikolchenko (UKR)	13.300	8.325		21.625	Q
4	Katsiaryna Halkina (BLR)	12.200	9.000		21.200	Q
5	Katrin Taseva (BUL)	12.300	7.800		20.100	Q
6	Alexandra Agiurgiuculese (ITA)	11.100	8.500		19.600	Q
7	Zohra Aghamirova (AZE)	11.400	7.825		19.225	R1
8	Andreea Verdeș (ROU)	11.100	7.850		18.950	R2
9	Eleni Kelaiditi (GRE)	11.700	7.050		18.750	
10	Salome Pazhava (GEO)	10.900	7.400	–0.050	18.250	
11	Nicol Ruprecht (AUT)	9.700	7.250		16.950	
12	Fanni Pigniczki (HUN)	8.900	5.700		14.600	

== Final ==
Rank	Gymnast	D Score	E Score	Pen.	Total
1st place, gold medalist(s)	Linoy Ashram (ISR)	13.700	9.000		22.700
2nd place, silver medalist(s)	Dina Averina (RUS)	14.300	8.300		22.600
3rd place, bronze medalist(s)	Vlada Nikolchenko (UKR)	13.300	8.450		21.750
4	Katrin Taseva (BUL)	12.500	8.300		20.800
5	Katsiaryna Halkina (BLR)	12.000	8.750		20.750
6	Alexandra Agiurgiuculese (ITA)	11.800	8.600		20.400
