= Cycling at the 2019 European Games – Men's points race =

Men's points race at the 2019 European Games
- Venue: Minsk Velodrome
- Date: 28 June
- Competitors: 17 from 17 nations
- Winning points: 45

Medalists
gold medal	Christos Volikakis	Greece
silver medal	Jan-Willem van Schip	Netherlands
bronze medal	Dmitrii Mukhomediarov	Russia

The men's points race at the 2019 European Games was held at the Minsk Velodrome on 28 June 2019.

== Results ==
160 laps (40 km) were raced with 16 sprints.

Rank	Name	Nation	Sprint																Laps		Total	Finish order
Rank	Name	Nation	1	2	3	4	5	6	7	8	9	10	11	12	13	14	15	16	+	−	Total	Finish order
1st place, gold medalist(s)	Christos Volikakis	Greece	5	1	3	3				3	2	3	5	2		3	5	10			45	1
2nd place, silver medalist(s)	Jan-Willem van Schip	Netherlands			1	5	2			5	5		3	3		5	3	6			38	2
3rd place, bronze medalist(s)	Dmitrii Mukhomediarov	Russia												5					20		25	13
4	Óscar Pelegrí	Spain			5				1	2				1	3			2			14	4
5	Liam Bertazzo	Italy							5	1	3	2	2								13	9
6	Raman Ramanau	Belarus					5	5									2				12	8
7	Andreas Graf	Austria				1	3	3							2						9	14
8	Gerben Thijssen	Belgium	2			2												4			8	3
9	Miguel do Rego	Portugal		2							1	5									8	10
10	Marc Potts	Ireland							3						5						8	12
11	Viktor Filutás	Hungary		3				1					1			2					7	7
12	Nicolas Pietrula	Czech Republic	3						2						1						6	6
13	Nico Selenati	Switzerland	1				1					1				1	1				5	5
14	Vitaliy Hryniv	Ukraine						2													2	15
15	Damian Sławek	Poland			2															20	−18	11
	Edgar Stepanyan	Armenia		5																20		DNF
	Andrej Strmiska	Slovakia																		40		DNF
