= Greece at the 2019 European Games =

- IOC code: GRE
- NOC: Hellenic Olympic Committee
- Website: www.hoc.gr

in Minsk, Belarus 21 – 30 June 2019
- Competitors: 65 in 12 sports
- Flag bearers: Panagiotis Gionis (opening); Christos Volikakis (closing)
- Medals Ranked 20th: Gold 3 Silver 2 Bronze 4 Total 9

European Games appearances (overview)
- 2015; 2019; 2023; 2027

Greece competed at the 2019 European Games, in Minsk, Belarus from 21 to 30 June 2019.

== Medalists ==
Medal	Name	Sport	Event	Date
Gold	Anna Korakaki	Shooting	Women's 25m Pistol	26 June
Gold	Christos Volikakis	Cycling	Men's Scratch Race	27 June
Gold	Christos Volikakis	Cycling	Men's Points Race	28 June
Silver	Anna Korakaki	Shooting	Women's 10m Air Pistol	23 June
Silver	Savvas Karakizidis	Sambo	Men's −62kg	23 June
Bronze	Georgios Azoidis	Judo	Men's −73kg	23 June
Bronze	Rafailía Spanoudaki-Hatziriga	Athletics	Women's 100m	23 June
Bronze	Konstantinos Douvalidis	Athletics	Men's 110m Hurdles	23 June
Bronze	Eleni Chatziliadou	Karate	Women's Kumite +68kg	29 June

Medals by sport
Sport	1st place, gold medalist(s)	2nd place, silver medalist(s)	3rd place, bronze medalist(s)	Total
Athletics	0	0	2	2
Cycling	2	0	0	2
Judo	0	0	1	1
Karate	0	0	1	1
Sambo	0	1	0	1
Shooting	1	1	0	2
Total	3	2	4	9

Medals by gender
Gender	1st place, gold medalist(s)	2nd place, silver medalist(s)	3rd place, bronze medalist(s)	Total
Male	2	1	2	5
Female	1	1	2	4
Total	3	2	4	9

Medals by date
Day	Date	1st place, gold medalist(s)	2nd place, silver medalist(s)	3rd place, bronze medalist(s)	Total
Day 1	22 June	0	0	0	0
Day 2	23 June	0	2	3	5
Day 3	24 June	0	0	0	0
Day 4	25 June	0	0	0	0
Day 5	26 June	1	0	0	1
Day 6	27 June	1	0	0	1
Day 7	28 June	1	0	0	1
Day 8	29 June	0	0	1	1
Day 9	30 June	0	0	0	0
Total		3	2	4	9

Multiple medalists
Name	Sport	1st place, gold medalist(s)	2nd place, silver medalist(s)	3rd place, bronze medalist(s)	Total
Anna Korakaki	Shooting	1	1	0	2
Christos Volikakis	Cycling	2	0	0	2

== Archery ==
=== Recurve ===
==== Men ====
Athlete	Event	Ranking round		Round of 64	Round of 32	Round of 16	Quarterfinals	Semifinals	Final / BM	
Athlete	Event	Score	Seed	Opposition Score	Opposition Score	Opposition Score	Opposition Score	Opposition Score	Opposition Score	Rank
Alexandros Karageorgiou	Men's individual	645	29	Piippo (FIN); W 6–0	Nespoli (ITA); L 3–7	Did not advance				

==== Women ====
Athlete	Event	Ranking round		Round of 64	Round of 32	Round of 16	Quarterfinals	Semifinals	Final / BM	
Athlete	Event	Score	Seed	Opposition Score	Opposition Score	Opposition Score	Opposition Score	Opposition Score	Opposition Score	Rank
Evangelia Psarra	Women's individual	609	35	Kovačić (CRO); L 4–6	Did not advance					

==== Mixed team ====
Athlete	Event	Ranking round		Round of 64	Round of 32	Round of 16	Quarterfinals	Semifinals	Final / BM	
Athlete	Event	Score	Seed	Opposition Score	Opposition Score	Opposition Score	Opposition Score	Opposition Score	Opposition Score	Rank
Alexandros Karageorgiou; Evangelia Psarra	Mixed team	1254	15	—N/a	Croatia; L 2–6	Did not advance				

== Athletics ==
=== Track events ===
Athlete	Event	Result	Position
Ioannis Nyfantopoulos	Men's 100 m	10.54	—N/a
Rafailía Spanoudaki-Hatziriga	Women's 100 m	11.61	3rd place, bronze medalist(s)
Konstantinos Douvalidis	Men's 110 m hurdles	13.72	3rd place, bronze medalist(s)
Kleanthi Santa	Women's 100 m hurdles	14.04	—N/a
Panagiotis Trivyzas; Antonios Alexandridis; Despoina Mourta; Elpida-Ioanna Karkalatou	Mixed 4 × 400 m relay	3:24.26	—N/a
Christos Kotitsas; Konstantinos Nakos; Grigoria Keramida; Konstantina Giannopoulou	Mixed distance pursuit relay	4:36.74	—N/a

=== Field events ===
Athlete	Event	Distance	Position
Antonios Merlos	Men's high jump	2.09	—N/a
Efthymia Kolokytha	Women's long jump	6.14	—N/a
Sofia Yfantidou	Women's javelin throw	52.12	—N/a

=== Team event ===
Athlete	Event	Qualification					Quarterfinals					Semifinals					Final				
Athlete	Event	Result	Event Rank	Points	Total points	Overall Rank	Result	Event Rank	Points	Total points	Overall Rank	Result	Event Rank	Points	Total points	Overall Rank	Result	Event Rank	Points	Total points	Overall Rank
Efthymia Kolokytha	Women's long jump	6.14	4	6	65	3 q	6.06	3	8	72	2 Q	6.13	4	6	48	6	Did not advance				
Ioannis Nyfantopoulos	Men's 100m	10.54	3	8	65	3 q	10.73	3	8	72	2 Q	10.58	6	2	48	6	Did not advance				
Sofia Yfantidou	Women's javelin throw	52.12	3	8	65	3 q	52.18	2	10	72	2 Q	52.10*	5	4	48	6	Did not advance				
Rafailía Spanoudaki-Hatziriga	Women's 100m	11.61	1	12	65	3 q	11.44	1	12	72	2 Q	11.42	1	12	48	6	Did not advance				
Panagiotis Trivyzas (Qualification-QF); Antonios Alexandridis; Despoina Mourta; Elpida-Ioanna Karkalatou; Konstantinos Nakos (SF)	Mixed 4 × 400 m relay	3:24.26	3	8	65	3 q	3:22.88	3	8	72	2 Q	3:20.81	4	6	48	6	Did not advance				
Konstantinos Douvalidis	Men's 110m hurdles	13.72	1	12	65	3 q	13.46	2	10	72	2 Q	13.46	1	12	48	6	Did not advance				
Antonios Merlos	Men's high jump	2.09*	3	7	65	3 q	2.12	1	12	72	2 Q	1.95	6	2	48	6	Did not advance				
Kleanthi Santa (Qualification); Kyriaki Samani (QF-SF)	Women's 100m hurdles	14.04	5	4	65	3 q	16.68	5	4	72	2 Q	13.91	5	4	48	6	Did not advance				
Christos Kotitsas; Konstantinos Nakos; Grigoria Keramida (Qualification); Konstantina Giannopoulou; Korina Politi (QF); Panagiotis Trivyzas (SF)	Mixed distance pursuit relay	4:36.74	3	—N/a	65	3 q	4:29.18	2	—N/a	72	2 Q	4:41.05	6	—N/a	48	6	Did not advance				

Reserves:

- Alexandros Peristeris
- Michail Kiafas
- Konstantinos Vasilakis
- Korina Politi
- Alanna Bern
- Kyriaki Samani

== Boxing ==
=== Men ===
Athlete	Event	Round of 64	Round of 32	Round of 16	Quarterfinals	Semifinals	Final	
Athlete	Event	Opposition Result	Opposition Result	Opposition Result	Opposition Result	Opposition Result	Opposition Result	Rank
Alexandros Tsanikidis	64 kg	—N/a	Kirkorov (BUL); W 5–0 WP	Shtiwi (ISR); W 3–2 WP	Bachkov (ARM); L 0–5 WP	Did not advance		
Pavlos Tsagkrakos	75 kg	Bye	Chartoi (SWE); L 2–3 WP	Did not advance				

=== Women ===
Athlete	Event	Round of 64	Round of 32	Round of 16	Quarterfinals	Semifinals	Final	
Athlete	Event	Opposition Result	Opposition Result	Opposition Result	Opposition Result	Opposition Result	Opposition Result	Rank
Katerina Koutsogeorgopoulou	51 kg	—N/a		Bye	Dimitrova (BUL); L 0–5 WP	Did not advance		

== Canoeing ==
=== Men ===
Athlete	Event	Heats		Semifinals		Finals	
Athlete	Event	Time	Rank	Time	Rank	Time	Rank
Stefanos Dimopoulos	C-1 1000 m	4:13.888	17	Did not advance			
Kostas Efthimiadis; Panagiotis Antoniou	K-2 1000 m	3:30.192	16	Did not advance			

== Cycling ==
=== Road ===
==== Men ====
Athlete	Event	Time	Rank
Georgios Bouglas	Men's road race	4:10:58	26
Polychronis Tzortzakis	Men's road race	4:10:58	33
Charalampos Kastrantas	Men's road race	4:10:58	29

==== Women ====
Athlete	Event	Time	Rank
Varvara Fasoi	Women's road race	3:03:43	53

=== Track ===
==== Madison ====
Athlete	Event	Points	Laps	Rank
Christos Volikakis; Zafeiris Volikakis	Men's madison	DNF		

==== Endurance ====
===== Scratch =====
Athlete	Event	Time	Rank
Christos Volikakis	Men's scratch race	17:57	1st place, gold medalist(s)

===== Points race =====
Athlete	Event	Sprint Points																Total	Rank
Athlete	Event	1	2	3	4	5	6	7	8	9	10	11	12	13	14	15	16	Total	Rank
Christos Volikakis	Men's points race	5	1	3	3	0	0	0	3	2	3	5	2	0	3	5	10	45	1st place, gold medalist(s)

==== Omnium ====
Athlete	Event	Scratch Race		Tempo Race			Elimination Race		Points Race												Total points	Rank
Athlete	Event	Rank	Points	Race Points	Rank	Points	Rank	Points	Sprint Points										Total	Rank	Total points	Rank
Athlete	Event	Rank	Points	Race Points	Rank	Points	Rank	Points	1	2	3	4	5	6	7	8	9	10	Total	Rank	Total points	Rank
Christos Volikakis	Men's omnium	2	38	1	7	28	6	30	3	0	0	0	0	0	5	1	0	2	11	8	107	5

== Gymnastics ==
=== Artistic ===
==== Men ====
Athlete	Event	Qualification								Final							
Athlete	Event	Apparatus						Total	Rank	Apparatus						Total	Rank
Athlete	Event	F	PH	R	V	PB	HB	Total	Rank	F	PH	R	V	PB	HB	Total	Rank
Nikolaos Iliopoulos	Floor Exercise	13.066	—N/a						25	Did not advance							
Nikolaos Iliopoulos	Pommel Horse	—N/a	12.900	—N/a					24	Did not advance							
Nikolaos Iliopoulos	Rings	—N/a		13.266	—N/a				12	Did not advance							
Nikolaos Iliopoulos	Parallel Bars	—N/a				13.100	—N/a		24	Did not advance							
Nikolaos Iliopoulos	Vault	—N/a			14.000	—N/a			13	Did not advance							
Nikolaos Iliopoulos	Horizontal Bar	—N/a					13.433	—N/a	13	Did not advance							
Nikolaos Iliopoulos	All-Around	13.066	12.900	13.266	14.000	13.100	13.433	79.765	14 Q	12.866	12.966	13.333	14.133	14.066	13.766	81.130	10

==== Women ====
Athlete	Event	Qualification						Final					
Athlete	Event	Apparatus				Total	Rank	Apparatus				Total	Rank
Athlete	Event	V	UB	BB	F	Total	Rank	V	UB	BB	F	Total	Rank
Elvira Katsali	Vault	11.700	—N/a				37	Did not advance					
Elvira Katsali	Uneven Bars	—N/a	7.400	—N/a			36	Did not advance					
Elvira Katsali	Balance Beam	—N/a		11.833	—N/a		18	Did not advance					
Elvira Katsali	Floor Exercise	—N/a			11.233	—N/a	31	Did not advance					
Elvira Katsali	All-Around	11.700	7.400	11.833	11.233	42.166	33	Did not advance					

=== Rhythmic ===
Athlete	Event	Qualification						Final					
Athlete	Event	Hoop	Ball	Clubs	Ribbon	Total	Rank	Hoop	Ball	Clubs	Ribbon	Total	Rank
Eleni Kelaiditi	Clubs	—N/a		18.750	—N/a		9	Did not advance					
Eleni Kelaiditi	Ribbon	—N/a			16.300	—N/a	8	Did not advance					
Eleni Kelaiditi	Hoop	20.425	—N/a				5 Q	18.750	—N/a				4
Eleni Kelaiditi	Ball	—N/a	18.900	—N/a			5 Q	—N/a	19.400	—N/a			5
Eleni Kelaiditi	All-Around	—N/a						20.425	18.900	18.750	16.300	74.375	7

=== Trampoline ===
==== Men ====
Athlete	Event	Qualification		Final	
Athlete	Event	Score	Rank	Score	Rank
Marios Grapsas	Individual	105.370	13	Did not advance	

==== Women ====
Athlete	Event	Qualification		Final	
Athlete	Event	Score	Rank	Score	Rank
Lila Kasapoglou	Individual	96.495	12	Did not advance	

== Judo ==
=== Men ===
Athlete	Event	Round of 64	Round of 32	Round of 16	Quarterfinals	Semifinals	Repechage	Final / BM	
Athlete	Event	Opposition Result	Opposition Result	Opposition Result	Opposition Result	Opposition Result	Opposition Result	Opposition Result	Rank
Georgios Azoidis	−73 kg	Bye	Hojak (SLO); W 010-000	Gjakova (KOS); W 011-000	Heydarov (AZE); W 010-000	Orujov (AZE); L 000-010	—N/a	Butbul (ISR); W 010-001	3rd place, bronze medalist(s)
Alexios Ntanatsidis	−81 kg	Bye	Tõniste (EST); W 001-000	Esposito (ITA); L 000-010	Did not advance				
Dimitrios Tsoumitas	+100 kg	—N/a	Ćulum (SRB); L 000-010	Did not advance					

=== Women ===
Athlete	Event	Round of 32	Round of 16	Quarterfinals	Semifinals	Repechage	Final / BM	
Athlete	Event	Opposition Result	Opposition Result	Opposition Result	Opposition Result	Opposition Result	Opposition Result	Rank
Elisavet Teltsidou	−70 kg	Butkereit (GER); W 011-000	Matic (CRO); L 000-010	Did not advance				

== Karate ==
=== Women ===
Athlete	Event	Group stage				Semifinal	Final / BM	
Athlete	Event	Opposition Score	Opposition Score	Opposition Score	Group stage Position	Opposition Score	Opposition Score	Rank
Eleni Chatziliadou	Kumite +68kg	Keinänen (FIN); D 0-0	Antunovic (SWE); W 5-0	Ferracuti (ITA); W 1-0	1 Q	Palacio Gonzalez (ESP); L 1-3	Did not advance	3rd place, bronze medalist(s)

== Sambo ==
=== Men ===
Athlete	Event	Quarterfinals	Repechage	Semifinals	Final / BM	
Athlete	Event	Opposition Result	Opposition Result	Opposition Result	Opposition Result	Rank
Savvas Karakizidis	−62 kg	Garayev (AZE); W 1–1 VO	—N/a	Aniskevich (BLR); W 0–0 VH	Bagdasarian (RUS); L 0–2 VO	2nd place, silver medalist(s)
Georgios Markarian	−74 kg	Martirosyan (BUL); W 10–0 VS	—N/a	Nakhutsrishvili (GEO); L 1–5 VP	Ghazaryan (ARM); L 2–10 VP	4
Vasili Balampanasvili	−82 kg	Perepelyuk (RUS); L 1–1 VH	Oslobanu (MDA); L 1–4 VO	Did not advance		

=== Women ===
Athlete	Event	Quarterfinals	Repecahge	Semifinals	Final / BM	
Athlete	Event	Opposition Result	Opposition Result	Opposition Result	Opposition Result	Rank
Valentina Gogua	−56 kg	Donos (MDA); W 2–0 VW	—N/a	Kazeniunk (RUS); L 0–8 VS	Poroineanu (ROU); L 0–0 VH	4
Eirini Skorda	−64 kg	Valvoi (ROU); L 3–8 VH	Matsko (BLR); L 0–0 VI	Did not advance		

== Shooting ==
=== Men ===
Athlete	Event	Qualification		Final	
Athlete	Event	Points	Rank	Points	Rank
Dionysios Korakakis	10 m air pistol	566	31	Did not advance	
Nikolaos Mavrommatis	Skeet	116	17	Did not advance	

=== Women ===
Athlete	Event	Qualification		Final	
Athlete	Event	Points	Rank	Points	Rank
Anna Korakaki	10 m air pistol	572	8 q	238.9	2nd place, silver medalist(s)
Anna Korakaki	25 m pistol	583	6 q	35	1st place, gold medalist(s)
Dimitra Papakanellou	10 m air pistol	552	33	Did not advance	

=== Mixed team ===
Athlete	Event	Qualification		Semifinals		Final / BM	
Athlete	Event	Points	Rank	Points	Rank	Opposition Result	Rank
Anna Korakaki; Dionysios Korakakis	10 m air pistol	568	14	—N/a		Did not advance	
Anna Korakaki; Dionysios Korakakis	25 m pistol	DNS		Did not advance			
Anna Korakaki; Dionysios Korakakis	50 m pistol	346	9	Did not advance			

== Table tennis ==
=== Men ===
Athlete	Event	Round 1	Round 2	Round 3	Round 4	Quarterfinals	Semifinals	Final / BM	
Athlete	Event	Opposition Result	Opposition Result	Opposition Result	Opposition Result	Opposition Result	Opposition Result	Opposition Result	Rank
Ioannis Sgouropoulos	Men's singles	Bye	Sirucek (CZE); W 4–2	Ovtcharov (GER); L 0–4	Did not advance				
Panagiotis Gionis	Men's singles	Bye	Mladenovic (LUX); W 4–0	Pitchford (GBR); W 4–1	Pucar (BLR); L 2–4	Did not advance			

=== Women ===
Athlete	Event	Round 1	Round 2	Round 3	Round 4	Quarterfinals	Semifinals	Final / BM	
Athlete	Event	Opposition Result	Opposition Result	Opposition Result	Opposition Result	Opposition Result	Opposition Result	Opposition Result	Rank
Aikaterini Toliou	Women's singles	Bye	Shao (POR); L 2–4	Did not advance					

== Wrestling ==
Key:

- VFA – Victory by fall.
- VPO – Victory by points – the loser without technical points.
- VPO1 – Victory by points – the loser with technical points.
- VSU – Victory by technical superiority – the loser without technical points and a margin of victory of at least 8 (Greco-Roman) or 10 (freestyle) points.
- VSU1 – Victory by technical superiority – the loser with technical points and a margin of victory of at least 8 (Greco-Roman) or 10 (freestyle) points.

=== Men's freestyle ===
Athlete	Event	Round of 16	Quarterfinals	Semifinals	Repechage	Final / BM	
Athlete	Event	Opposition Result	Opposition Result	Opposition Result	Opposition Result	Opposition Result	Rank
Kyrillos Binenmpaoum	−74 kg	Andruse (EST); W 8–6 VPO1	Demirtas (TUR); L 4–15 VSU1	Did not advance	Gadzhiyev (AZE); L 3–10 VPO1	Did not advance	
Georgios Savvoulidis	−86 kg	Dudarov (GER); L 0–10 VSU	Did not advance				
Christos Samartsidis	−97 kg	Ceban (MDA); L 2–10 VFA	Did not advance				
Ioannis Kargiotakis	−125 kg	Khizriev (RUS); L 0–11 VSU	Did not advance		Yasarli (TUR); L 0–4 VPO	Did not advance	

=== Men's Greco-Roman ===
Athlete	Event	Round of 16	Quarterfinals	Semifinals	Repechage	Final / BM	
Athlete	Event	Opposition Result	Opposition Result	Opposition Result	Opposition Result	Opposition Result	Rank
Dimitrios Tsekeridis	−87 kg	Kobliashvili (GEO); L 0-10 VSU	Did not advance				

=== Women's freestyle ===
Athlete	Event	Round of 16	Quarterfinals	Semifinals	Repechage	Final / BM	
Athlete	Event	Opposition Result	Opposition Result	Opposition Result	Opposition Result	Opposition Result	Rank
Athina Giagtzoglou	−50 kg	Ciricu (MDA); L 1–6 VPO1	Did not advance				
Maria Prevolaraki	−53 kg	Kippernes (NOR); W 10–0 VFA	Orshush (RUS); L 2–2 VPO1	Did not advance			
Zoi Chatsatourova	−57 kg	Gun (TUR); L 3–13 VSU1	Did not advance				
Aikaterini-Eirini Pitsiava	−76 kg	Aliyeva (AZE); L 0–9 VPO	Did not advance				
