= List of indoor arenas in Belarus =

Arenas in Belarus

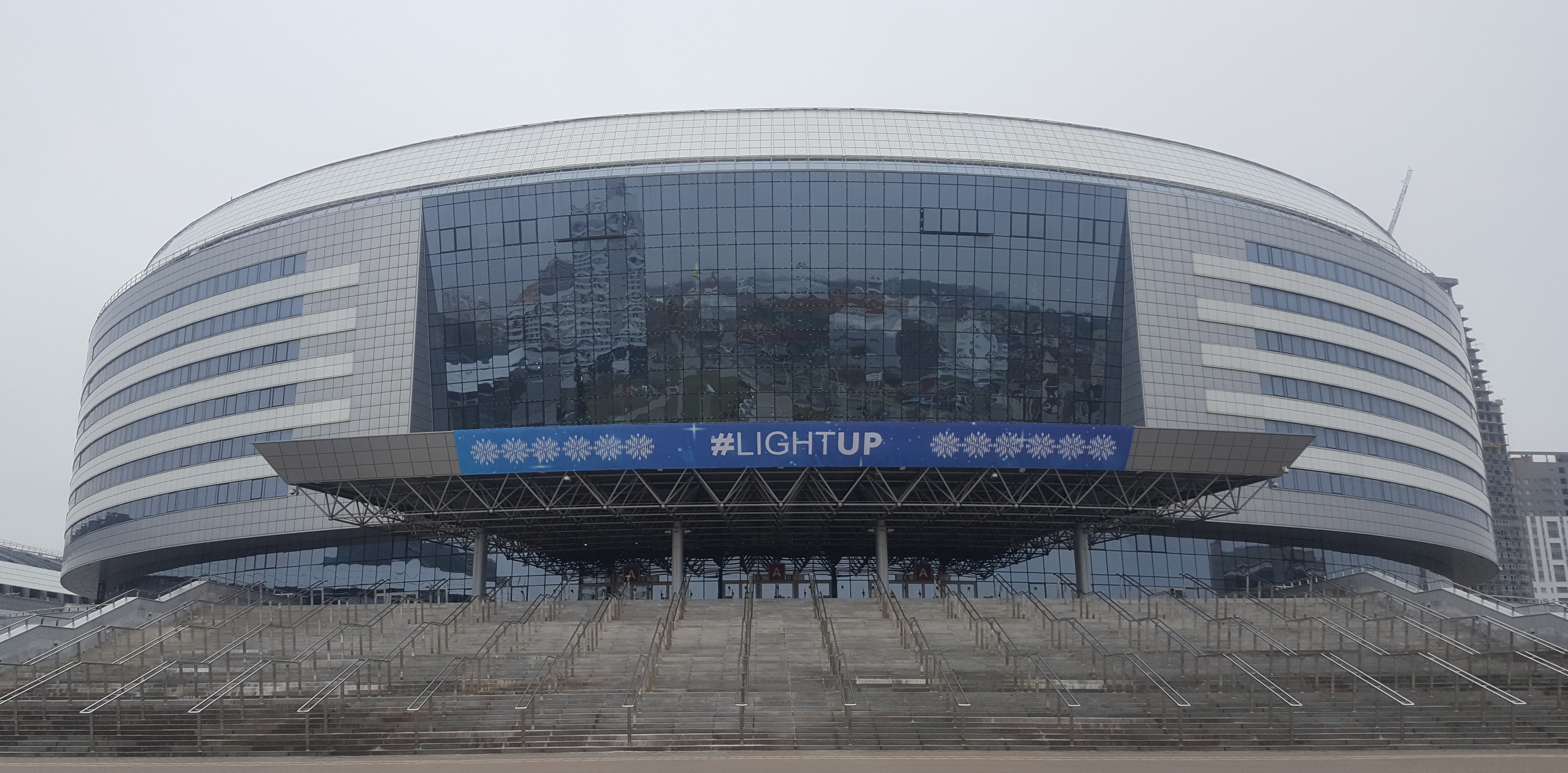
Minsk-Arena

The following is a list of indoor arenas in Belarus with capacity of at least 1,500 spectators. Most of the arenas in this list are for multi use proposes such as individual sports, team sports as well as cultural and political events.

== Currently in use ==
Location	Arena	Date built	Capacity	Tenants
Minsk	Čyžoŭka Arena	2013	9,614	
Minsk	Minsk Arena	2009	15,086	
Minsk	Minsk Ice Palace	1999	1,823	
Minsk	Minsk Sports Palace	1966	4,842	
Babruysk	Babruysk Arena	2008	7,151	Shinnik Bobruisk
Brest	Brest Ice Sports Palace	2000	2,000	
Gomel	Gomel Ice Sports Palace	2000	2,760	
Baranavichy	Palace of Sports Baranavichy	2009	2,158	
Grodno	Ice Palace of Sports Grodno	1991	2,487	
Zhlobin	Metallurg Ice Palace	2006	2,018	
Mogilev	Mogilev Sports Palace	2000	3,048	
Maladzyechna	Youth Sports Center Maladzyechna	2011	2,200	

== See also ==
- List of football stadiums in Belarus
- List of indoor arenas by capacity
