= Athletics at the 2019 European Games – Men's 110 metres hurdles =

Men's 110 metres hurdles at the 2019 European Games
- Venue: Dinamo Stadium, Minsk
- Date: 23 June
- Winning time: 13.60

Medalists
gold medal	Hassane Fofana	Italy
silver medal	Vitali Parakhonka	Belarus
bronze medal	Konstadinos Douvalidis	Greece

The men's 110 metres hurdles event at the 2019 European Games in Minsk took place on 23 June. The winners in this discipline were determined during the qualifications for Dynamic New Athletics.

== Results ==
Wind:
Match 1: -0.8 m/s, Match 2: +1.4 m/s, Match 3: -0.3 m/s, Match 4: +1.3 m/s

Rank	Match	Lane	Athlete	Nation	Time	Notes
1st place, gold medalist(s)	2	4	Hassane Fofana	Italy	13.60	
2nd place, silver medalist(s)	3	5	Vitali Parakhonka	Belarus	13.68	
3rd place, bronze medalist(s)	1	5	Konstadinos Douvalidis	Greece	13.72	
4	1	2	Maximilian Bayer	Germany	13.80	
5	4	5	Yidiel Contreras	Spain	13.86	SB
6	2	3	Artyom Makarenko	Russia	13.88	
7	3	4	Artur Noga	Poland	13.91	
8	4	2	Andreas Martinsen	Denmark	13.95	SB
9	3	6	David Ryba	Czech Republic	14.02	PB
10	3	3	Gerard O'Donnell	Ireland	14.15	
11	4	6	Artem Shamatryn	Ukraine	14.21	SB
12	2	6	Marvin Pistol	France	14.29	
13	2	7	Cosmin Dumitrache	Romania	14.30	
14	4	4	Mikdat Sevler	Turkey	14.35 (.345)	
15	3	7	Rapolas Saulius	Lithuania	14.35 (.350)	
16	2	2	Filip Jakob Demšar	Slovenia	14.36 (.352)	
16	1	7	Brahian Peña	Switzerland	14.36 (.352)	
18	4	7	Stanislav Stankov	Bulgaria	14.36 (.353)	SB
19	1	4	Bálint Szeles	Hungary	14.57	
20	1	3	Elvis Kryukov	Cyprus	15.25	PB
21	3	2	Kristaps Sietiņš	Latvia	15.45	
22	1	6	Marco Adrien Drozda	Slovakia	15.49	SB
23	4	3	Victor Korst	Portugal	15.51	PB
24	2	5	Johannes Treiel	Estonia	21.63	
