= Shooting at the 2019 European Games – Women's 25 metre pistol =

Women's 25 metre pistol at the 2019 European Games
- Venue: Shooting Centre
- Dates: 25–26 June
- Competitors: 35 from 23 nations
- Winning score: 35

Medalists
| gold medal | Anna Korakaki | Greece |
| silver medal | Heidi Diethelm Gerber | Switzerland |
| bronze medal | Antoaneta Boneva | Bulgaria |

The women's 25 metre pistol event at the 2019 European Games in Minsk, Belarus took place on 25 and 26 June at the Shooting Centre.

== Schedule ==
All times are local (UTC+3).

| Date | Time | Event |
|---|---|---|
| Tuesday, 25 June 2019 | 09:00 | Qualification Precision |
| Wednesday, 26 June 2019 | 09:15 | Qualification Rapid |
| Wednesday, 26 June 2019 | 13:20 | Final |

== Records ==
Prior to this competition, the existing world, European and Games records were as follows.

Qualification
| World Record | Diana Iorgova (BUL) | 594 | Milan, Italy | 31 May 1994 |
| European Record | Diana Iorgova (BUL) | 594 | Milan, Italy | 31 May 1994 |
| Games Record | Sylvia Steiner (AUT) | 585 | Baku, Azerbaijan | 20 June 2015 |
Final
| World Record | Veronika Major (HUN) | 40 | New Delhi, India | 24 February 2019 |
| European Record | Veronika Major (HUN) | 40 | New Delhi, India | 24 February 2019 |
| Games Record | ISSF Rule changed on 01.01.2018 | — | — | — |

== Results ==
=== Qualification ===
| Rank | Athlete | Country | Precision | | | | Rapid | | | | Total | Notes |
| Rank | Athlete | Country | Series | | | ST1 | Series | | | ST2 | Total | Notes |
| Rank | Athlete | Country | 1 | 2 | 3 | ST1 | 1 | 2 | 3 | ST2 | Total | Notes |
|---|---|---|---|---|---|---|---|---|---|---|---|---|
| 1 | Monika Karsch | Germany | 98 | 96 | 98 | 292 | 99 | 99 | 99 | 297 | 589-17x | Q, GR |
| 2 | Vitalina Batsarashkina | Russia | 98 | 95 | 97 | 290 | 98 | 99 | 99 | 296 | 586-23x | Q |
| 3 | Céline Goberville | France | 96 | 97 | 99 | 292 | 100 | 97 | 96 | 293 | 585-20x | Q |
| 4 | Zorana Arunović | Serbia | 97 | 98 | 99 | 294 | 100 | 98 | 93 | 291 | 585-20x | Q |
| 5 | Heidi Diethelm Gerber | Switzerland | 96 | 97 | 99 | 292 | 97 | 97 | 99 | 293 | 585-12x | Q |
| 6 | Anna Korakaki | Greece | 98 | 96 | 97 | 291 | 94 | 99 | 99 | 292 | 583-23x | Q |
| 7 | Doreen Vennekamp | Germany | 96 | 97 | 95 | 288 | 99 | 98 | 98 | 295 | 583-23x | Q |
| 8 | Antoaneta Boneva | Bulgaria | 94 | 99 | 98 | 291 | 98 | 96 | 98 | 292 | 583-19x | Q |
| 9 | Veronika Major | Hungary | 96 | 98 | 95 | 289 | 98 | 99 | 97 | 294 | 583-19x | |
| 10 | Renata Červenková | Czech Republic | 97 | 97 | 96 | 290 | 98 | 97 | 97 | 292 | 582-25x | |
| 11 | Vlatka Pervan | Croatia | 95 | 95 | 96 | 286 | 99 | 97 | 98 | 294 | 580-16x | |
| 12 | Maria Grozdeva | Bulgaria | 94 | 93 | 99 | 286 | 97 | 97 | 100 | 294 | 580-15x | |
| 13 | Agate Rašmane | Latvia | 96 | 95 | 99 | 290 | 95 | 99 | 96 | 290 | 580-13x | |
| 14 | Klaudia Breś | Poland | 100 | 95 | 98 | 293 | 96 | 92 | 98 | 286 | 579-21x | |
| 15 | Mathilde Lamolle | France | 92 | 97 | 94 | 283 | 97 | 99 | 99 | 295 | 578-16x | |
| 16 | Margarita Lomova | Russia | 94 | 97 | 98 | 289 | 95 | 96 | 98 | 289 | 578-14x | |
| 17 | Oksana Kovalchuk | Ukraine | 91 | 96 | 97 | 284 | 96 | 99 | 97 | 292 | 576-17x | |
| 18 | Sylvia Steiner | Austria | 94 | 95 | 95 | 284 | 97 | 98 | 97 | 292 | 576-17x | |
| 19 | Margherita Veccaro | Italy | 92 | 96 | 97 | 285 | 94 | 100 | 96 | 290 | 575-13x | |
| 20 | Anna Dědová | Czech Republic | 89 | 97 | 95 | 281 | 100 | 94 | 99 | 293 | 574-22x | |
| 21 | Viktoria Chaika | Belarus | 97 | 97 | 97 | 291 | 95 | 96 | 92 | 283 | 574-18x | |
| 22 | Joana Castelão | Portugal | 98 | 96 | 97 | 291 | 93 | 93 | 96 | 282 | 573-10x | |
| 23 | Olena Kostevych | Ukraine | 94 | 93 | 98 | 285 | 96 | 95 | 95 | 286 | 571-14x | |
| 24 | Zsófia Csonka | Hungary | 98 | 96 | 93 | 287 | 95 | 95 | 93 | 283 | 570-14x | |
| 25 | Nino Salukvadze | Georgia | 94 | 94 | 94 | 282 | 94 | 98 | 95 | 287 | 569-14x | |
| 26 | Sonia Franquet | Spain | 99 | 99 | 99 | 297 | 91 | 94 | 87 | 272 | 569-13x | |
| 27 | Katsiaryna Kruchanok | Belarus | 93 | 95 | 94 | 282 | 96 | 93 | 95 | 284 | 566-14x | |
| 28 | Maria Varricchio | Italy | 97 | 95 | 96 | 288 | 90 | 96 | 92 | 278 | 566-10x | |
| 29 | Joanna Tomala | Poland | 94 | 89 | 95 | 278 | 95 | 97 | 95 | 287 | 565-16x | |
| 30 | Eleanor Bezzina | Malta | 96 | 92 | 94 | 282 | 90 | 96 | 97 | 283 | 565-12x | |
| 31 | Jekaterina Ždanova | Lithuania | 93 | 95 | 92 | 280 | 96 | 94 | 94 | 284 | 564-14x | |
| 32 | Gabrielė Rankelytė | Lithuania | 96 | 90 | 90 | 276 | 96 | 93 | 98 | 287 | 563-10x | |
| 33 | Manuela Delilaj | Albania | 95 | 92 | 97 | 284 | 95 | 86 | 92 | 273 | 557-15x | |
| 34 | Bobana Veličković Momčilović | Serbia | 93 | 94 | 98 | 285 | 85 | 91 | 94 | 270 | 555-12x | |
| 35 | Nigar Nasirova | Azerbaijan | 92 | 88 | 93 | 273 | 93 | 92 | 93 | 278 | 551-8x | |

=== Final ===
| Rank | Athlete | Series | | | | | | | | | | Total | S-off | Notes |
| Rank | Athlete | 1 | 2 | 3 | 4 | 5 | 6 | 7 | 8 | 9 | 10 | Total | S-off | Notes |
|---|---|---|---|---|---|---|---|---|---|---|---|---|---|---|
| 1st place, gold medalist(s) | Anna Korakaki (GRE) | 5 | 5 | 4 | 3 | 3 | 4 | 3 | 3 | 4 | 1 | 35 | +3 | GR |
| 1st place, gold medalist(s) | Anna Korakaki (GRE) | 5 | 10 | 14 | 17 | 20 | 24 | 27 | 30 | 34 | 35 | 35 | +3 | GR |
| 2nd place, silver medalist(s) | Heidi Diethelm Gerber (SUI) | 4 | 3 | 5 | 4 | 2 | 2 | 4 | 4 | 3 | 4 | 35 | +2 | GR |
| 2nd place, silver medalist(s) | Heidi Diethelm Gerber (SUI) | 4 | 7 | 12 | 16 | 18 | 20* | 24 | 28 | 31* | 35 | 35 | +2 | GR |
| 3rd place, bronze medalist(s) | Antoaneta Boneva (BUL) | 3 | 2 | 5 | 5 | 4 | 2 | 3 | 4 | 3 | | 31 | | |
| 3rd place, bronze medalist(s) | Antoaneta Boneva (BUL) | 3 | 5 | 10 | 15 | 19 | 21 | 24 | 28 | 31* | | 31 | | |
| 4 | Vitalina Batsarashkina (RUS) | 4 | 1 | 3 | 5 | 4 | 4 | 2 | 4 | | | 27 | | |
| 4 | Vitalina Batsarashkina (RUS) | 4 | 5 | 8 | 13 | 17 | 21 | 23 | 27 | | | 27 | | |
| 5 | Monika Karsch (GER) | 5 | 4 | 3 | 3 | 3 | 3 | 1 | | | | 22 | | |
| 5 | Monika Karsch (GER) | 5 | 9 | 12 | 15 | 18 | 21 | 22 | | | | 22 | | |
| 6 | Doreen Vennekamp (GER) | 4 | 4 | 3 | 3 | 3 | 3 | | | | | 20 | | |
| 6 | Doreen Vennekamp (GER) | 4 | 8 | 11 | 14 | 17 | 20* | | | | | 20 | | |
| 7 | Zorana Arunović (SRB) | 4 | 1 | 1 | 4 | 2 | | | | | | 12 | | |
| 7 | Zorana Arunović (SRB) | 4 | 5 | 6 | 10 | 12 | | | | | | 12 | | |
| 8 | Céline Goberville (FRA) | 1 | 2 | 1 | 3 | | | | | | | 7 | | |
| 8 | Céline Goberville (FRA) | 1 | 3 | 4 | 7 | | | | | | | 7 | | |
