= Football in Belarus =

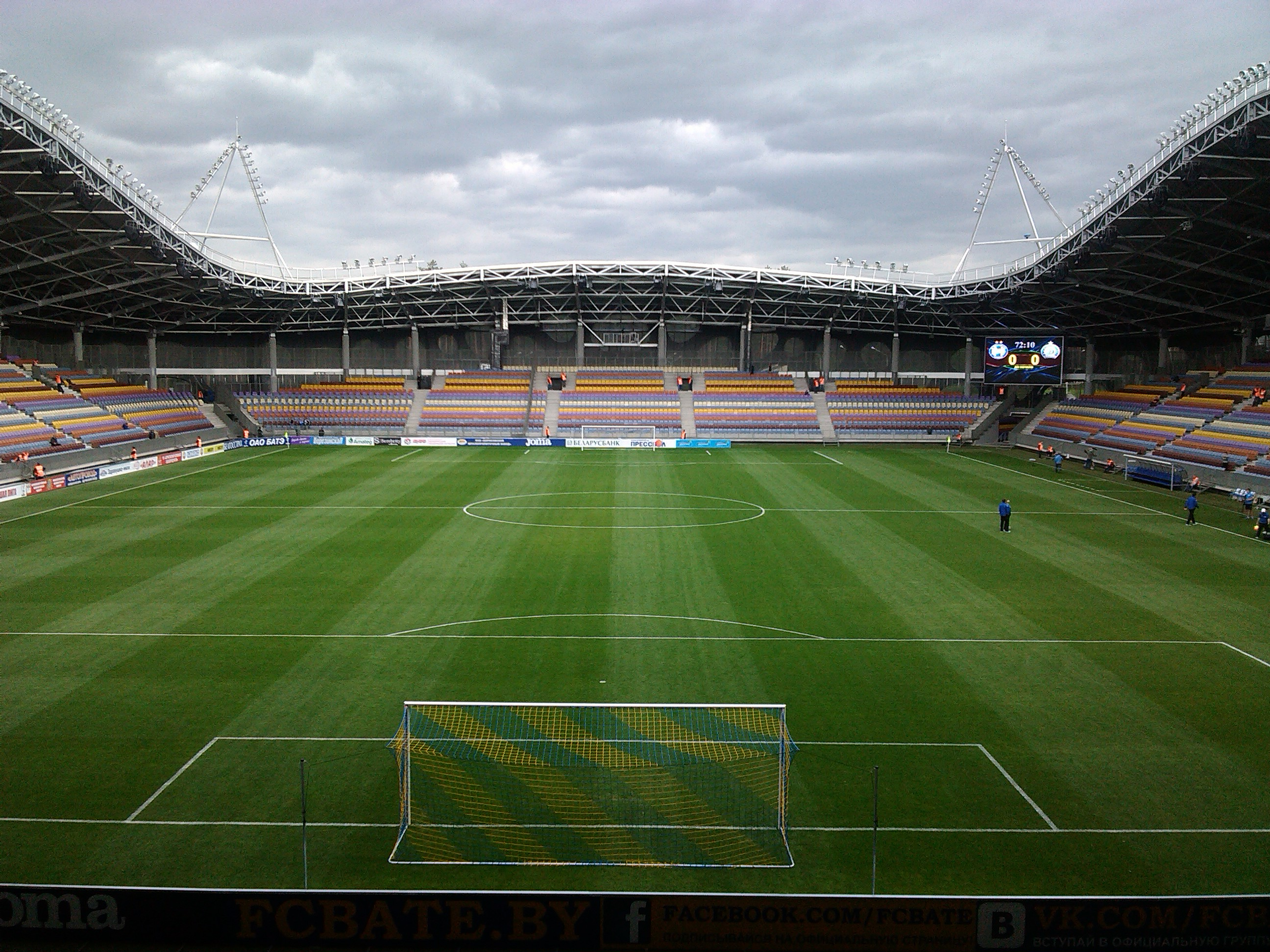
- Borisov Arena is home ground of club FC BATE Borisov
- Country: Belarus
- Governing body: Football Federation of Belarus
- National team: Belarus national football team
- First played: 1910; 116 years ago

National competitions
- Belarusian Cup

Club competitions
- Belarusian Premier League; Belarusian First League; Belarusian Second League

International competitions
- Champions League; Europa League; Conference League; Super Cup; FIFA Club World Cup; FIFA Intercontinental Cup; FIFA World Cup (National Team); European Championship (National Team); UEFA Nations League (National Team)

Association football (Belarusian: Асацыяцыя футбола) – commonly known as football (or soccer in the United States, Canada, Australia and Ireland, which have their own football codes) – is the most popular sport in the nation of Belarus. As constituent national republics of the former USSR, Belarusian football was governed by Football Federation of the Soviet Union until 1989 when the Football Federation of Belarus was founded. After the nation achieved political independence in 1991, the BFF joined FIFA in 1992 and gained UEFA membership in 1993.

The country's national football governing body runs the national football teams for both men and women, as well as administering the nation's professional leagues the Belarusian Premier League, First League, and Second League. The national federation also organizes the Belarusian Cup annual knockout tournament and the one off Belarusian Super Cup.

After the 2022 Russian invasion of Ukraine, FIFA and UEFA, the European governing body for football, banned Belarusian national and club teams from international competitions, and UEFA banned Belarus from hosting international competitions.

== History ==
The history of football in Belarus is traced to 1910 with the founding of a club called First Gymnasium Football Team in Gomel. From 1922 until 1991, the Championship of the Belarusian SSR (Belarusian: Першая ліга чэмпіянату БССР па футболе) was the top competition of association football in the Belarusian SSR. During this period, FC Dinamo Minsk were the only club from the Byelorussian SSR that competed in the Soviet Top League, winning the title in 1982.

The Football Federation of Belarus (Belarusian: Беларуская федэрацыя футбола; Biełaruskaja Fiederacyja Futboła) was founded on 21 November 1989, although was not admitted to FIFA until on 3 July 1992 and did not become a UEFA member until 20 June 1993. The men's national team made their international debut in a friendly away to Lithuania on 20 July 1992 in a 1:1 draw. They made their competitive debut in a 2:0 victory on 12 October 1994 against Luxembourg as part of their participation in the 1996 UEFA European Football Championship, in which they finished fourth in their group. The women's national team made its international competitive debut in a 5:2 victory over Bosnia and Herzegovina on 19 August 2001 as part of their participation in the 2003 Women's World Cup Qualifying, in which they finished third in their group.

In 1991, the BFF established the Belarusian Premier League, the top league in the nation. The second and third level leagues, the Belarusian First League and the Belarusian Second League were established in 2010. Since independence, the successful most team from Belarus has been FC BATE Borisov having won, as of 2020, 15 of the 29 titles available and being the only team from Belarus to qualify for the UEFA Champions League group stages. The women's Premier League competition was established by the BFF in 2010. FC Minsk has been the most successful women's team in Belarus having won 7 championships as of 2020.

In 2020, the Belarusian League gained international recognition during the coronavirus pandemic due to the fact it continued when many other leagues were suspended.

After the 2022 Russian invasion of Ukraine, FIFA and UEFA, banned Belarus from hosting international national and club competitions.

== League system ==
For the 2025 season:

Level	League(s)/Division(s)
1	Belarusian Premier League; 16 clubs
	↓ 2.5 clubs ↑ 2.5 clubs
2	Belarusian First League; 18 clubs
	↓ 4 club ↑ TBC clubs
3	Belarusian Second League; 84 clubs into 6 zones
4	Belarusian Regional Leagues

== See also ==
- Belarus national football team
- Belarusian Premier League
- List of football stadiums in Belarus
