= Špela Dragaš =

Slovenian-Italian rhythmic gymnastics coach

Špela Alenka Dragaš
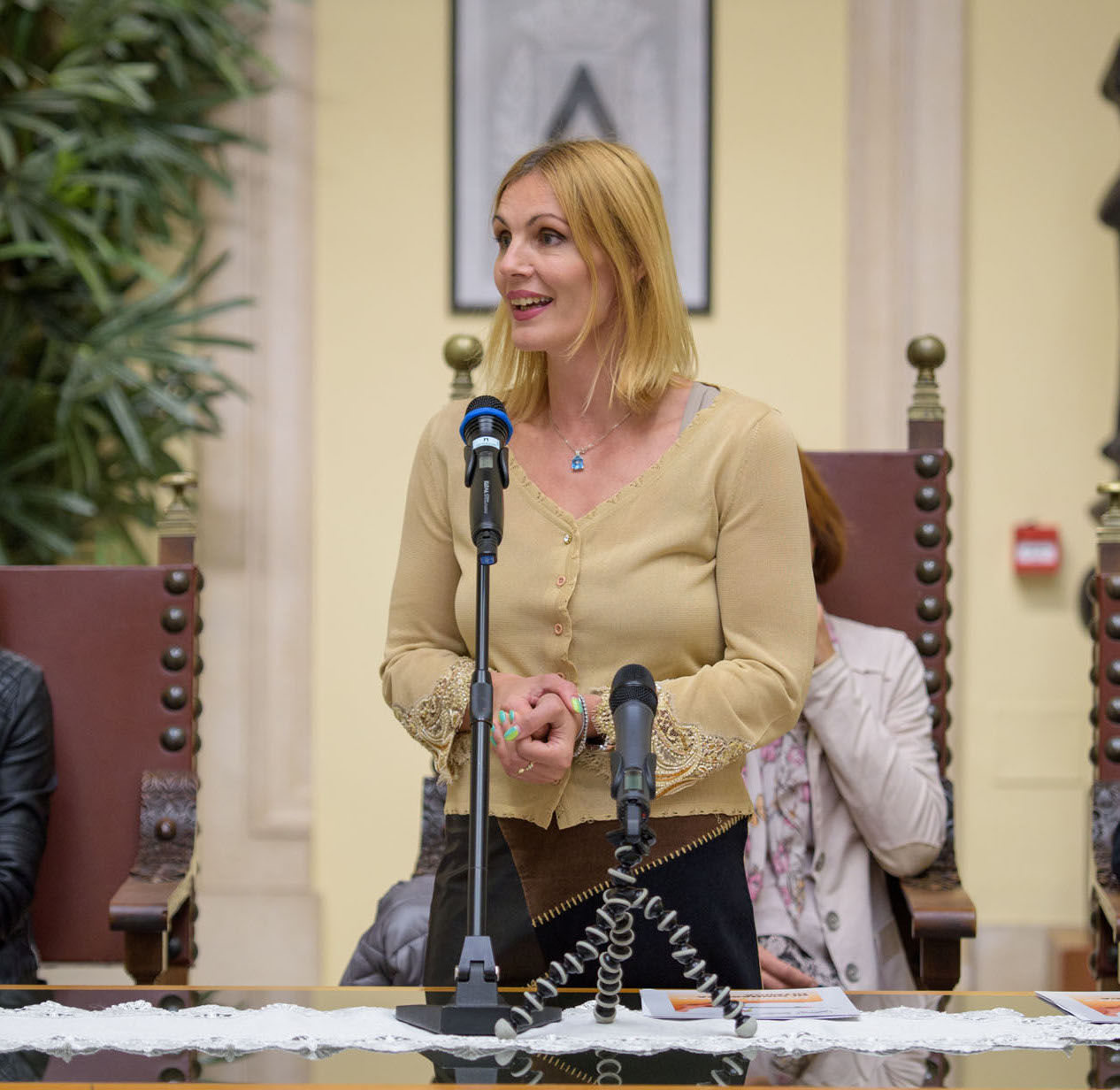
- Born: Špela Alenka Mohar; 14 April 1970 (age 56); Ljubljana, Slovenia
- Citizenship: Slovenian / Italian
- Education: University of Ljubljana
- Occupations: Rhythmic gymnastics coach and judge
- Years active: 1992-present
- Employer: Associazione Sportiva Udinese
- Spouse: Sasha Dragas
- Children: 2 (including Tara Dragas)

Špela Dragaš (born 14 April 1970) is a Slovenian-Italian rhythmic gymnastics coach and judge. During her career she trained world class gymnasts as Alexandra Agiurgiuculese, Tara Dragas to name a few.

== Biography ==
Špela began to work as a rhythmic gymnastics coach thanks to her mother, also a coach of this discipline, then obtaining certification as a first, second and third level trainer at the FIG Academy in Lausanne.

From 1992 to 1997 she trained at the sports club of her hometown Vrhnika, Športna Zveza Vrhnika, following the preparation of gymnasts of national interest, including Ana Stumberger (World Championships Brussels 1992), Sandra Zilavec (World Championships Alicante 1993) and Dusica Jeremic (European Championships Prague 1995 and World Championships Berlin 1997).

In 1996 she was responsible for the Slovenian junior group at the European Championships in Asker, Norway. In 1998 she became the technical director of the Siska sports club in Ljubljana, where she followed the preparation for the European Championships in Porto of the individual gymnasts of the national team Dusica Jeremic, Tina Cas and Mojca Rode. The next year she coached the Slovenian senior group that conquered an historical final with five pairs of clubs at the European Championships.

She then moved to Udine, Italy, where she began her collaboration with Associazione Sportiva Udinese, covering the role of technical director leading, over the years, the club to compete in the most important championships at national level. In 2009 she gained Italian citizenship and obtained the federal technical license.

In 2014 she led the club to victory in the Serie A2 rhythmic gymnastics championship and promotion to the Serie A1, in which the club still competes today. Thanks to the results obtained by her leadership, in 2017 the Italian Gymnastics Federation awarded ASU the title of National Technical Center.

From 2010 to 2021 she has been the coach of the Italian gymnast of Romanian origins, Alexandra Agiurgiuculese, who, following her parents' move to Italy, began training at ASU, obtaining numerous titles over time in national and international competitions, including various silver European medals as a junior in 2016 as well as the bronze medal with ball and bronze in team at 2018 World Championships in Sofia. On the occasion of the 2019 World Championships she got a pass for the 2020 Olympic Games, there she finished 15th in qualification.

She is currently also the coach of the gymnasts of national interest Tara Dragaš and Isabelle Tavano.

As a judge, since 1993 she has been an international FIG judge for Slovenia. She participated as a competition official at the Olympic Games in Athens 2004, London 2012 and Rio 2016. She also judged in the editions of the World Championships in Berlin 1997, New Orleans 2002, Budapest 2003, Patras 2007, Mie 2009, Moscow 2010, Montpellier 2011, Izmir 2014, Stuttgart 2015 and Pesaro 2017; in addition to the European ones in Prague 1995, Askar 1996, Porto 1998, Budapest 1999, Geneva 2001, Moscow 2006, Bremen 2010, Minsk 2011, Nizni-Novgorod 2012, Vienna 2013, Minsk 2015, Holon 2016 and Budapest 2017.

From 1993 to 2014 Dragaš was President of the Slovenian national jury with the responsibility of supervising all competitions on the national territory. From 2014 to 2017 he was the jury representative for the Friuli Venezia Giulia region.

== Personal life ==
Špela was a basketball player in her youth, she learned Italian while working as a nanny. In 1997 she graduated from the Faculty of Sociology, Political Science and Journalism at the University of Ljubljana. In 2001 she married the singer and actor Sasha Dragas with whom she had two children: Marko and Tara Dragas, the latter a rhythmic gymnast.

== Notable trainees ==
- Alexandra Agiurgiuculese (ITA)
- Tara Dragas (ITA)
- Isabelle Tavano (ITA)
- Melissa Girelli (ITA)
- Alice Del Frate (ITA) dancer contestant of the talent show Amici di Maria De Filippi
- Miriam Marina (ITA)
- Lara Paolini (ITA)
- Virginia Samez (ITA)
- Mojca Rode (SLO)
- Sandra Zilavec (SLO)
- Ana Stumberger (SLO)
- Dusica Jeremic (SLO)
- Tina Cas (SLO)
- Aleksandra Podgorsek (SLO)
- Meghana Gundlapally (IND)
- Lily Ramonatxo (FRA)
- Urrutia Montserrat (CHL)
- China national senior group
- Slovenia national team
