= Athletics at the 2019 European Games – Women's 100 metres =

Athletics competition

Women's 100 metres at the 2019 European Games
- Venue: Dinamo Stadium, Minsk
- Date: 23 June
- Winning time: 11.36

Medalists
gold medal	Maja Mihalinec	Slovenia
silver medal	Krystsina Tsimanouskaya	Belarus
bronze medal	Rafailía Spanoudaki-Hatziriga	Greece

The women's 100 metres event at the 2019 European Games in Minsk took place on 23 June. The winners in this discipline were determined during the qualifications for Dynamic New Athletics.

== Results ==
Wind:
Match 1: -1.2 m/s, Match 2: +0.6 m/s, Match 3: +1.1 m/s, Match 4: -1.3 m/s

Rank	Match	Lane	Athlete	Nation	Time	Notes
1st place, gold medalist(s)	2	7	Maja Mihalinec	Slovenia	11.36 (.359)	
2nd place, silver medalist(s)	3	4	Krystsina Tsimanouskaya	Belarus	11.36 (.360)	SB
3rd place, bronze medalist(s)	1	4	Rafailía Spanoudaki-Hatziriga	Greece	11.61	SB
4	4	2	Lorène Bazolo	Portugal	11.63	
5	3	7	Sindija Bukša	Latvia	11.67	SB
6	1	2	Ramona Papaioannou	Cyprus	11.70	
7	4	6	Inna Eftimova	Bulgaria	11.71	SB
8	4	7	Astrid Glenner-Frandsen	Denmark	11.73	
9	2	2	Dzhennifer Akiniimika	Russia	11.74	
10	2	3	Johanelis Herrera Abreu	Italy	11.75 (.741)	
11	3	5	Marcela Pírková	Czech Republic	11.75 (.746)	
12	4	3	Mizgin Ay	Turkey	11.75 (.750)	SB
12	2	5	Nasrane Bacar	France	11.75 (.750)	SB
14	2	6	Marina Baboi	Romania	11.79 (.782)	
15	3	2	Niamh Whelan	Ireland	11.79 (.783)	SB
16	4	5	Khrystyna Stuy	Ukraine	11.83	
17	3	6	Karolina Deliautaitė	Lithuania	11.84	
18	4	4	Estela García	Spain	11.89	SB
19	1	7	Sina Mayer	Germany	11.93	
20	1	5	Monika Weigertová	Slovakia	11.99	SB
21	3	3	Katarzyna Tuniewicz	Poland	12.06	
22	1	3	Petra Farkas	Hungary	12.08	
23	2	4	Maarja Kalev	Estonia	12.11	SB
24	1	6	Samantha Dagry	Switzerland	12.13	
