= Israel at the 2019 European Games =

Israel's competition at the 2019 European Games

- IOC code: ISR
- NOC: Olympic Committee of Israel
- Website: www.olympicsil.co.il (in Hebrew)

in Minsk, Belarus
- Competitors: 32 in 10 sports
- Flag bearers: Opening – Misha Zilberman; Closing – Andrey Medvedev
- Medals Ranked 19th: Gold 3 Silver 3 Bronze 1 Total 7

European Games appearances (overview)
- 2015; 2019; 2023; 2027

Israel competed at the 2019 European Games in Minsk, Belarus from 21 June to 30 June 2019.

== Medalists ==
Medal	Name	Sport	Event	Date
Gold	Linoy Ashram	Gymnastics	Women's rhythmic individual ball	23 June
Gold	Linoy Ashram	Gymnastics	Women's rhythmic individual clubs	23 June
Gold	Sergey Rikhter	Shooting	Men's 10 m air rifle	24 June
Silver	Linoy Ashram	Gymnastics	Individual all-around	22 June
Silver	Linoy Ashram	Gymnastics	Women's rhythmic individual ribbon	23 June
Silver	Li Kochman	Judo	Men's −90 kg	24 June
Bronze	Misha Zilberman	Badminton	Men's singles	30 June

== Competitors ==
The Israeli delegation include 32 athletes competing in 10 sports.

Sport	Men	Women	Total
Archery	1	0	1
Badminton	1	2	3
Boxing	3	0	3
Cycling	2	2	4
Gymnastics	3	5	8
Judo	5	5	10
Shooting	1	1	2
Wrestling	1	0	1
Total	17	15	32

== Archery ==
Recurve

Athlete	Event	Ranking round		Round of 64	Round of 32	Round of 16	Quarterfinals	Semifinals	Final / BM	
Athlete	Event	Score	Seed	Opposition Score	Opposition Score	Opposition Score	Opposition Score	Opposition Score	Opposition Score	Rank
Itay Shanny	Men's individual	639	34	Dalidovich (BLR); L 2 – 6	Did not advance					

== Badminton ==
Athletes	Event	Group stage				Round of 16	Quarterfinals	Semifinals	Finals	Rank
Athletes	Event	Opposition Score	Opposition Score	Opposition Score	Rank	Opposition Score	Opposition Score	Opposition Score	Opposition Score	Rank
Misha Zilberman	Men's singles	Ivanič (SLO); W 2 – 0 (24–22, 21–18)	Maddaloni (ITA); W 2 – 0 (21–19, 21–16)	Heino (FIN); W 2 – 0 (21–16, 21–17)	1 Q	Krausz (HUN); W 2 – 0 (23–21, 21–16)	Caljouw (NED); W 2 – 1 (12–21, 21–17, 21–15)	Antonsen (DEN); L 0 – 2 (9–21, 11–21)	Did not advance	3rd place, bronze medalist(s)
Ksenia Polikarpova	Women's singles	Poghosyan (ARM); W 2 – 0 (21–8, 21–6)	Kjærsfeldt (DEN); L 0 – 2 (13–21, 17–21)	Ginga (MDA); W 2 – 0 (21–11, 21–17)	2 Q	Blichfeld (DEN); L 1 – 2 (9–21, 23–21, 17–21)	Did not advance			
Misha Zilberman; Svetlana Zilberman	Mixed doubles	Tabeling / Piek (NED); L 0 – 2 (10–21, 10–21)	Śmiłowski / Świerczyńska (POL); L 0 – 2 (16–21, 15–21)	Lamfuß / Herttrich (GER); L Retired	–	—	Did not advance			

== Boxing ==
Men

Athlete	Event	Round of 64	Round of 32	Round of 16	Quarterfinals	Semifinals	Final	
Athlete	Event	Opposition Result	Opposition Result	Opposition Result	Opposition Result	Opposition Result	Opposition Result	Rank
David Alaverdian	49 kg	—		Huseynov (AZE); L 0 – 4	Did not advance			
Ahmad Shitwi	64 kg	—	Bajoku (KOS); W 4 – 1	Tsanikidis (GRE); L 2 – 3	Did not advance			
Miroslav Kapuler	69 kg	Bye	Dauhaliavets (BLR); L RSC-I	Did not advance				

== Cycling ==
=== Road ===
Men

Athlete	Event	Time	Rank
Roy Goldstein	Men's road race	4:10:58	25
Itamar Einhorn	Men's road race	4:10:58	23
Itamar Einhorn	Men's time trial	36:47.23	27

Women

Athlete	Event	Time	Rank
Omer Shapira	Women's road race	3:09:36	64
Rotem Gafinovitz	Women's road race	3:08:24	24
Rotem Gafinovitz	Women's time trial	38:42.58	9

== Gymnastics ==
=== Acrobatic ===
Women's groups

Athlete	Event	Final	
Athlete	Event	Total	Rank
Or Armony; Tzlil Hurvitz; Yarin Ovadia	Women's Groups All-Around (Combined)	28.960	4
Or Armony; Tzlil Hurvitz; Yarin Ovadia	Women's Groups Balance	28.260	4
Or Armony; Tzlil Hurvitz; Yarin Ovadia	Women's Groups Dynamic	28.000	4

=== Artistic ===
Men
Apparatus

Athlete	Event	Qualification		Final	
Athlete	Event	Total	Rank	Total	Rank
Alexander Shatilov	Floor Exercise	13.100	24	Did not advance	
Alexander Shatilov	Pommel Horse	13.400	17	Did not advance	
Alexander Shatilov	Horizontal Bar	13.833	7 R1	Did not advance	
Artem Dolgopyat	Floor Exercise	13.866	17	Did not advance	
Artem Dolgopyat	Pommel Horse	13.900	9 R3	Did not advance	
Andrey Medvedev	Vault	14.666	3 Q	14.633	4

Women
All-Around

Athlete	Event	Qualification						Final					
Athlete	Event	Apparatus				Total	Rank	Apparatus				Total	Rank
Athlete	Event	F	V	UB	BB	Total	Rank	F	V	UB	BB	Total	Rank
Ofir Netzer	All-around	11.166 (33)	13.483 (7 Q)	DNS	9.300 (37)	DNF	–	Did not advance					

Apparatus

Athlete	Event	Final	
Athlete	Event	Total	Rank
Ofir Netzer	Vault	13.666	5

=== Rhythmic ===
Individual

Athlete	Event	Final					
Athlete	Event	Apparatus				Total	Rank
Athlete	Event	Ball	Clubs	Hoop	Ribbon	Total	Rank
Linoy Ashram	Individual all-around	22.000 (2 Q)	23.300 (1 Q)	21.950 (2 Q)	17.450 (6 Q)	84.700	2nd place, silver medalist(s)

Apparatus

Athlete	Event	Final	
Athlete	Event	Total	Rank
Linoy Ashram	Ball	22.500	1st place, gold medalist(s)
Linoy Ashram	Clubs	22.700	1st place, gold medalist(s)
Linoy Ashram	Hoop	15.900	6
Linoy Ashram	Ribbon	21.100	2nd place, silver medalist(s)

== Judo ==
Men

Athlete	Event	Round of 64	Round of 32	Round of 16	Quarterfinals	Semifinals	Repechage	Final / BM	
Athlete	Event	Opposition Result	Opposition Result	Opposition Result	Opposition Result	Opposition Result	Opposition Result	Opposition Result	Rank
Daniel Ben David	−60 kg	—	Gomis (ESP); W 01s1 – 00s2	Papinashvili (GEO); L 00 – 10	Did not advance				
Yarin Menaged	−66 kg	Bye	Poliak (SVK); W 10 – 00s3	Vieru (MDA); L 00s2 – 10	Did not advance				
Tohar Butbul	−73 kg	Bye	García (ESP); W 10 – 0	Ciloglu (TUR); W 01 – 00s1	Macias (SWE); L 00s1 – 11s2	Did not advance	Iartcev (RUS); W 10s1 – 00s2	Azoidis (GRE); L 01s1 – 10	5
Din Gemer	−73 kg	Bye	Fedosejenkovs (LAT); W 10 – 01s2	Heydarov (AZE); L 00s2 – 11	Did not advance				
Li Kochman	−90 kg	Kozlowski (POL); W 10 – 00	Schwendinger (LIE); W 10 – 00s1	Toth (HUN); W 10s2 – 00s3 (pen)	Randl (SVK); W 10s1 – 00s3 (pen)	van 't End (NED); W 10s1 – 00s2	—	Özerler (TUR); L 00s2 – 10s2 (pen)	2nd place, silver medalist(s)

Women

Athlete	Event	Round of 32	Round of 16	Quarterfinals	Semifinals	Repechage	Final / BM	
Athlete	Event	Opposition Result	Opposition Result	Opposition Result	Opposition Result	Opposition Result	Opposition Result	Rank
Shira Rishony	−48 kg	Csernoviczki (HUN); L 00s3 – 10s1 (pen)	Did not advance					
Timna Nelson-Levy	−57 kg	Bye	Verhagen (NED); L 00s2 – 01s1	Did not advance				
Gili Sharir	−63 kg	Kanerva (FIN); W 10 – 00s3 (pen)	Ozdoba (POL); L 00s3 – 10s1 (pen)	Did not advance				
Inbal Shemesh	−63 kg	Unterwurzacher (AUT); W 01s1 – 00s1	Agbegnenou (FRA); L 00s1 – 10	Did not advance				
Yarden Mayersohn	−70 kg	Samardzic (BIH); L 00s1 – 01s2	Did not advance					

== Shooting ==
Men

Athlete	Event	Qualification		Final	
Athlete	Event	Points	Rank	Points	Rank
Sergey Rikhter	10 m air rifle	628.8	5 Q	250.8	1st place, gold medalist(s)

Women

Athlete	Event	Qualification		Final	
Athlete	Event	Points	Rank	Points	Rank
Tal Engler	10 m air rifle	625.0	12	Did not advance	
Tal Engler	50 m rifle three positions	1153	21	Did not advance	

Mixed

Athlete	Event	Qualification		Final	
Athlete	Event	Points	Rank	Points	Rank
Sergey Rikhter; Tal Engler	10 m air rifle	623.9	9	Did not advance	

== Wrestling ==
Men's freestyle

Athlete	Event	Round of 16	Quarterfinal	Semifinal	Repechage	Final / BM	
Athlete	Event	Opposition Result	Opposition Result	Opposition Result	Opposition Result	Opposition Result	Rank
Uri Kalashnikov	-86 kg	Shabanau (BLR); L 2 – 5	Did not advance		Erdin (TUR); L 0 – 12	Did not advance	
