= Dmitry Mukhomediarov =

Russian cyclist (born 1999)

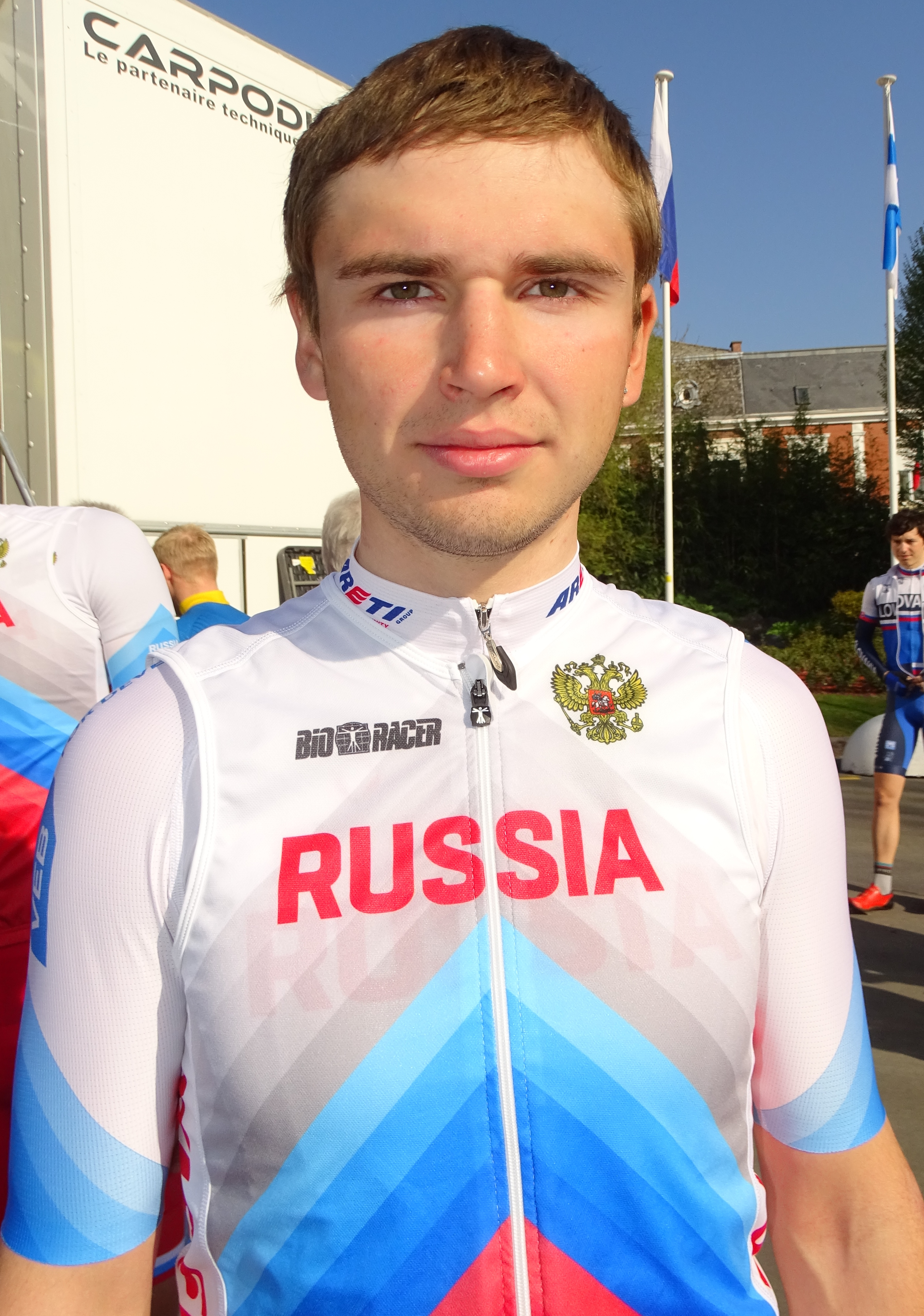
- Syritsa in 2017

Personal information
- Born: 24 May 1999 (age 27) Kopeysk, Russia

Cycling career
- Sport: Cycling
- Current team: Lokosphinx
- Disciplines: Track; Road
- Role: Rider

Amateur teams
- 2016–2017: Lokosphinx Junior
- 2018–2020: Lokosphinx Amateur

Professional team
- 2021–: Lokosphinx
Medal record
Men's track cycling
Representing Russia
European Games
| Bronze medal – third place | 2019 Minsk | Points race |

Dmitry Mukhomediarov (Russian: Дмитрий Мухомедьяров; born 24 May 1999) is a Russian road and track cyclist, who currently rides for UCI Continental team Lokosphinx.

== Major results ==
=== Track ===
2017
1st Team pursuit, UCI Junior World Track Championships (with Lev Gonov, Ivan Smirnov and Gleb Syritsa)
1st Team pursuit, European Junior Track Championships (with Lev Gonov, Ivan Smirnov and Gleb Syritsa)
UCI World Cup

3rd Team pursuit, Minsk

2nd Team pursuit, National Track Championships
2018
2nd Team pursuit, National Track Championships
3rd Team pursuit, European Under-23 Track Championships
2019
1st Team pursuit, European Under-23 Track Championships
3rd Points race, European Games

=== Road ===
2017
Tour du Pays de Vaud

1st Prologue & Stage 2
1st Mountains classification

2018
3rd Overall Vuelta a Alicante
