= Milena Baldassarri =

Italian rhythmic gymnast

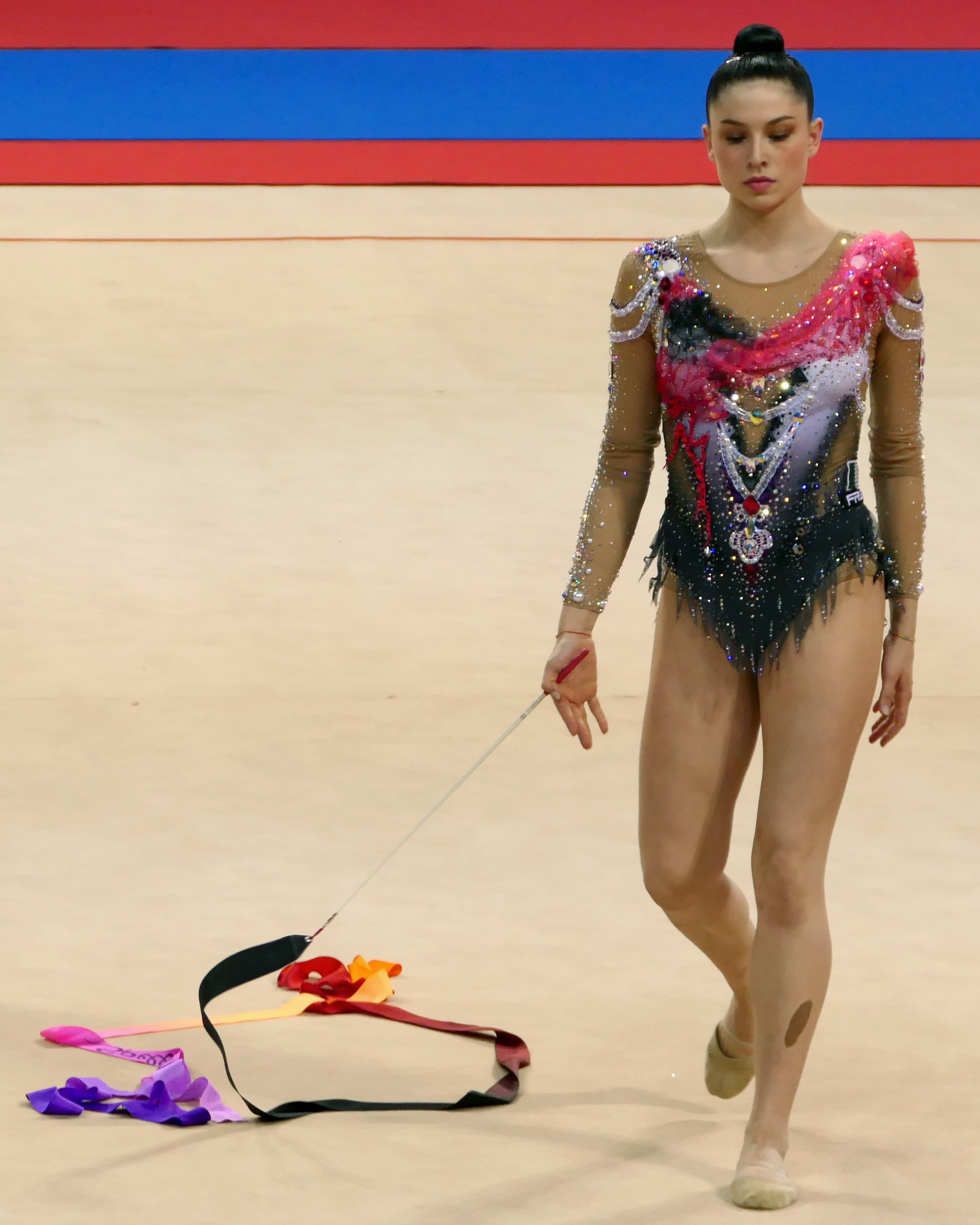
- Baldassarri during the Sofia World Cup in 2024

Personal information
- Full name: Milena Baldassarri
- Nickname: Millie
- Born: 16 October 2001 (age 25) Ravenna, Italy
- Height: 173 cm (5 ft 8 in)

Gymnastics career
- Discipline: Rhythmic gymnastics
- Country represented: Italy; (2015-2024)
- Club: Faber Ginnastica Fabriano
- Gym: Kori kori
- Head coach: Claudia Mancinelli
- Assistant coach: Valeria Carnali
- Former coaches: Julieta Cantaluppi, Kristina Guiourova
- Choreographer: Bilyana Dyakova
- World ranking: 2 WC (2022 Season) 7 WCC (2019 Season)
Medal record
Event	1st	2nd	3rd
World Championships	1	2	3
European Championships	0	2	0
FIG World Cup	3	6	9
Mediterranean Games	0	0	1
Total	4	10	13
Representing Italy
Rhythmic Gymnastics
World Championships
Gold medal – first place	2022 Sofia	Team
Silver medal – second place	2018 Sofia	Ribbon
Silver medal – second place	2021 Kitakyushu	Team
Bronze medal – third place	2018 Sofia	Team
Bronze medal – third place	2022 Sofia	Ball
Bronze medal – third place	2023 Valencia	Team
European Championships
Silver medal – second place	2022 Tel Aviv	Team
Silver medal – second place	2024 Budapest	Team
Mediterranean Games
Bronze medal – third place	2018 Tarragona	All-around
Junior European Championships
Bronze medal – third place	2016 Holon	Team

Milena Baldassarri (born 16 October 2001 in Ravenna, Italy) is an Italian former individual rhythmic gymnast. She won silver in the ribbon final at the 2018 Rhythmic Gymnastics World Championships, becoming the first Italian individual gymnast to win a silver medal in the World Championships. She also is the bronze medalist in the ball final at the 2022 Rhythmic Gymnastics World Championships, as well as a four-time Team medalist in the World Championships (2018, 2021-2023). She competed in the individual all-around at the 2020 and 2024 Summer Olympics, finishing within a top 8 position at both games.

Baldassarri is the 2016 European Junior Team bronze medalist. On the national level, she is a three-time (2018, 2020, 2021) Italian National all-around champion, a four-time (2019, 2022-2024) Italian National all-around silver medalist, the 2017 Italian National all-around bronze medalist, and the 2016 Italian Junior National all-around champion. She retired in November 2024.

== Personal life ==
Baldassarri's mother was a swimmer who competed internationally for the Soviet Union, and Baldassarri competed in swimming through age 7, at which point she tried other sports, including rhythmic gymnastics. She started practising rhythmic gymnastics in Ravenna. In addition to Italian, she speaks Russian. Baldassarri chose to pursue rhythmic gymnastics because she enjoyed the performance aspect, and she has chosen themes of social issues such as suicide, body shaming, and violence against women for some of her exercises.

== Career ==
=== Junior ===
In 2014 she moved to Fabriano and started being trained by the Olympian Julieta Cantaluppi and her mother, Bulgarian rhythmic gymnast Kristina Guiourova. In 2015 she was selected to be part of the Italian national junior group that competed at the 2015 Rhythmic Gymnastics European Championships in Minsk, Belarus. They placed 6th in the group all-around and 5th in the 5 balls final. At the 2016 European Championships, Baldassarri won the junior team bronze with Alexandra Agiurgiuculese. She did not advance into any apparatus finals due to the one-per-country rule.

=== Senior ===
In 2017, Baldassarri made her senior international debut at the international tournament Città Pesaro, where she won the bronze medal in the all-around and silver in the ribbon final. She also won gold in the clubs final ahead of Russian Ekaterina Selezneva. In May she competed at 2017 Sofia World Cup, her first world cup, where she took the 10th place in the all-around. On 19–21 May, Baldassarri, along with her teammates Alexandra Agiurgiuculese and Alessia Russo, represented the individual seniors for Italy at the 2017 European Championships, where she qualified for the ribbon final. She finished in 7th place.

On 5–7 August Baldassarri finished 8th in the all-around at the 2017 Minsk World Challenge Cup. She qualified for two apparatus finals and finished 7th in ribbon and 4th in ball. Her ball score was tied with third place (16.650), but the tie was broken in favour of her teammate Alexandra Agiurgiuculese, who received the bronze medal.

Together with Alexandra Agiurgiuculese, Baldassarri represented Italy at the 2017 World Rhythmic Gymnastics Championships in Pesaro, where she finished 9th in the all-around ahead of Bulgaria's Katrin Taseva; she also qualified for the ribbon final, where she finished in 6th place. She was awarded with the Alina Kabaeva Prize.

==== 2018 ====
In 2018, on 30 March – 1 April, Baldassarri began her series of World Cup events by competing at the 2018 Sofia World Cup. There she was 12th in the all-around, and she qualified for the hoop final, where she finished 5th. On 13–15 April Baldassarri competed at the 2018 Pesaro World Cup, finishing 9th in the all-around. She also qualified for the ribbon final. On 27–29 April she then competed in the event at the 2018 Baku World Cup, where she finished 8th in the all-around behind Japan's Kaho Minagawa and qualified for one event final. On 4–6 May she competed at the 2018 Guadalajara World Challenge Cup and had a new highest all-around placement when she finished fourth in the all-around behind Russia's Arina Averina.Baldassarri had an overall successful event, qualifying for all four apparatus finals and winning her first World Cup medals. She won silver in ball behind Linoy Ashram, and she also won a bronze in clubs. In both the ribbon and hoop finals, she finished 5th.

On 16–17 May Baldassarri competed at the 2018 Holon Grand Prix, finishing 7th in the all-around behind Salome Pazhava. She qualified for two apparatus finals, where she won her first Grand Prix gold medal in ribbon. She also won bronze in ball.

Baldassarri once again represented Italy with Alexandra Agiurgiuculese at the 2018 Rhythmic Gymnastics World Championships in Sofia. She won the silver medal in the ribbon apparatus final, becoming the first individual Italian gymnast to ever win an apparatus silver medal in the World Championship. Baldassarri said the medal came as a surprise and that she regarded it as "the reward for all the hard work, all the sacrifices we made during the months before".

==== 2019 ====
Baldassarri competed at the 2019 World Challenge Cup Minsk, where she won the bronze medal in the ribbon final. Next, she performed at the 2019 World Challenge Cup Portimao where she won the silver medal in the all-around competition. She also won a gold medal in the ball and ribbon final, and a silver medal in the clubs final. At the 2019 World Championships in Baku, Azerbaijan, Baldassarri represented Italy together with Alexandra Agiurgiuculese, Alessia Russo and Sofia Maffeis. The Italian gymnasts placed 4th in the team competition. Baldassarri placed 4th in the ball final and 8th in the ribbon final. In the all-around final, she finished in 7th place and secured Italy an Olympic spot for the 2020 Summer Olympics in Tokyo, Japan.

==== 2021 ====
In April, Mattel created a one-of-a-kind Barbie doll modeled on Baldassarri.

At the Tokyo 2020 Olympics, Baldassarri represented Italy along with Agiurgiuculese. Baldassarri qualified to the all-around final in 6th place, and she ended in the same placement during the final. She said she was very happy with her performance at the competition. Her placement was a record for Italian rhythmic gymnasts.

Baldassarri was selected to represent Italy at the 2021 World Championships in Kitakyushu, Japan. She won a silver medal in the team competition together with Sofia Raffaeli, Alexandra Agiurgiuculese, and the Italian group.

==== 2022 ====
In 2022, Baldassarri competed at the 2022 Sofia World Cup, where she won a bronze medal in the ball final. On 22–24 April, Baldassarri also competed at the 2022 World Cup Baku. She won the bronze medal in the all-around competition behind her teammate Sofia Raffaeli and Boryana Kaleyn from Bulgaria and won a silver medal with ball.

On 27–29 May Baldassarri competed at the 2022 Italian National Championships, where she won the silver medal in the all-around competition and four more silver medals in the apparatus finals. On 3–5 June Baldassarri competed at the 2022 World Cup Pesaro and won the silver medal in the all-around competition.

From 15 to 19 June Baldassarri competed at the 2022 European Championships in Tel Aviv, Israel. She won a silver medal in the team competition together with Sofia Raffaeli and the Italian group. In August, she performed at the 2022 World Challenge Cup Cluj-Napoca and won a bronze medal in the ball final. From 14 to 18 September, Baldassarri represented Italy at the World Championships in Sofia, Bulgaria, where she won a bronze medal in the ball final and a gold medal in the team competition.

==== 2023 ====
On 18 March, Baldassarri competed at the 2023 World Cup Athens and took 13th place in the all-around. Two weeks later, she competed at the next World Cup in Sofia, where she finished 12th all-around. She qualified for two apparatus finals and finished 8th in ribbon and 7th in ball. On 22 April, Baldassarri competed at her third World Cup of the season in Baku, where she took 30th place in the all-around.

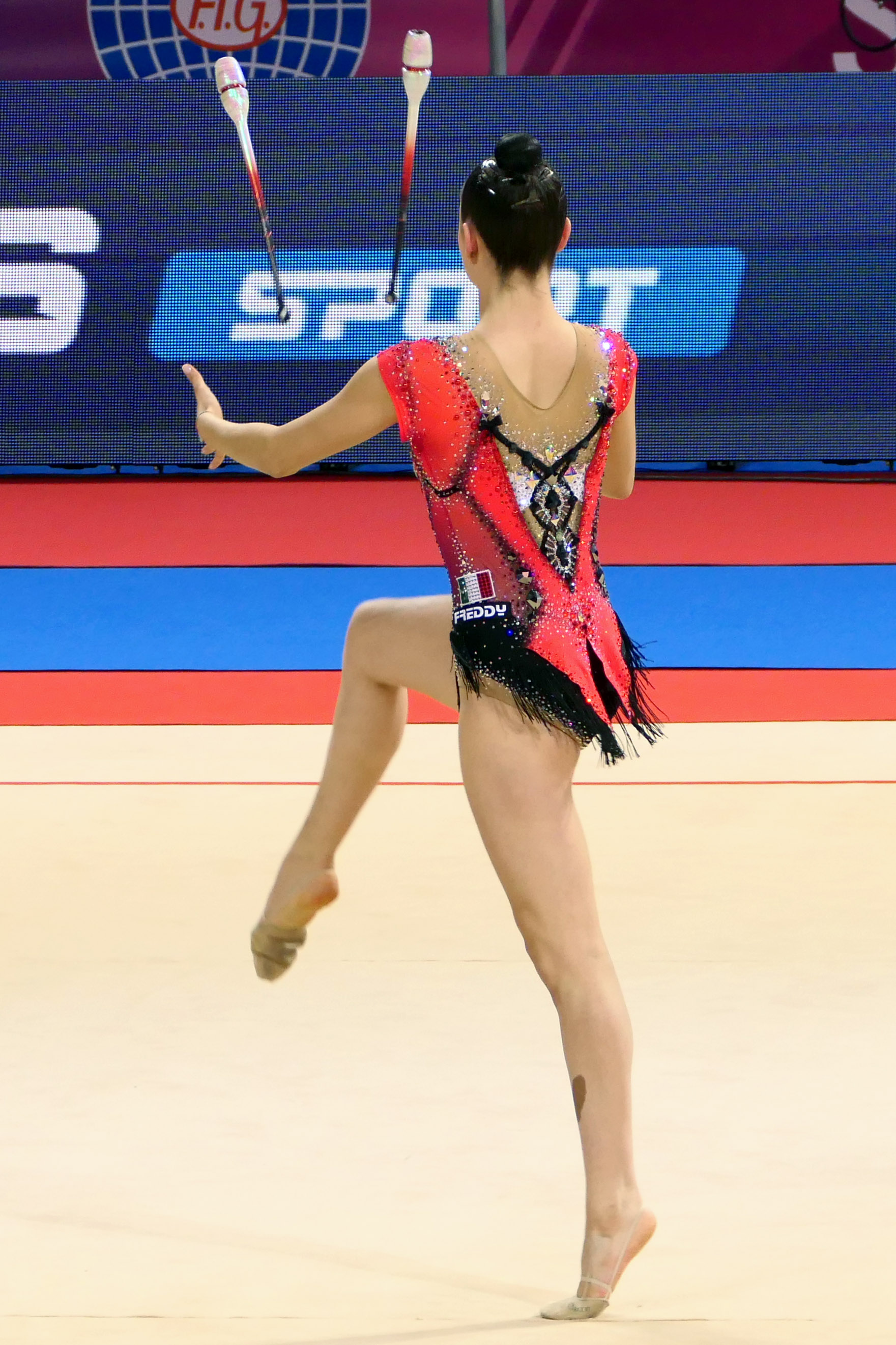
Baldassarri competing clubs at the 2024 Sofia World Cup

From 18–21 May, she competed at the 2023 European Championships in Baku, Azerbaijan with one apparatus, ribbon. She qualified for the ribbon final and finished in 5th place.

On 9–11 June Baldassarri competed at the 2023 Italian National Championships. There she won the silver medal in the all-around competition. In the apparatus finals, she won three more silver medals and a bronze medal. On 14–16 July, Baldassarri competed at the 2023 World Challenge Cup Cluj-Napoca and won the silver medal in the ball final.

In August, she was selected for the World Championships in Valencia. In the qualification round, both she and fellow Italian Sofia Raffaeli placed high enough to each win a berth at the 2024 Summer Olympics for Italy. Baldassarri said they hoped to compete together at the Olympics. In the all-around final, she placed 13th.

==== 2024 ====
Baldassarri began her season by competing at the 2024 World Cup Athens, where she finished 23rd all-around. She qualified in the clubs final and took 8th place. On 12–14 April, she competed at the 2024 World Cup Sofia and placed 18th in the all-around.

From 23–26 May, Baldassarri competed at the 2024 European Championships in Budapest, Hungary, where she was selected to represent Italy with three apparatuses in the qualifying round: ball, clubs and ribbon. In the all-around final, she placed 6th, and she qualified for the clubs final and finished 5th. She won a silver medal in the team competition together with Sofia Raffaeli and the Italian group.

On 8–9 June Baldassarri competed at the 2024 Italian National Championships. She won the silver medal in the all-around competition and went on to also win three bronze medals and another silver medal in the apparatus finals. At the Milano World Cup, she finished in 16th place in the all-around.

In August, Baldassarri competed at the 2024 Summer Olympics, where she qualified for the final in ninth place. She ultimately finished eighth in the final without making any major mistakes in her routines.

In November, she announced her retirement by giving a farewell exhibition at the Euskalgym gala in Spain.

== Achievements ==
- First Italian individual rhythmic gymnast to win a silver medal at the World Championships.
- First Italian individual rhythmic gymnast to place 6th in the all-around final at the Olympics.

== Detailed Olympic results ==
Year	Competition Description	Location	Music	Apparatus	Rank-Final	Score-Final	Rank-Qualifying	Score-Qualifying
2020	Olympics	Tokyo		All-around	6th	99.625	6th	96.050
2020	Olympics	Tokyo	Mephisto's Lullaby by Yair Albeg Wein & Or Kribos	Hoop	7th	25.100	6th	24.550
2020	Olympics	Tokyo	"L'immensità" by Mina	Ball	5th	25.625	7th	25.700
2020	Olympics	Tokyo	Bury a Friend by Billie Eilish	Clubs	6th	26.500	7th	25.650
2020	Olympics	Tokyo	Elegie: O doux printemps d'autrefois by Joshua Bell	Ribbon	4th	22.400	14th	20.150
2024	Olympics	Paris		All-around	8	129.700	9	129.250
2024	Olympics	Paris	Hit The Road Jack (Epic Cover) by 2WEI	Hoop	8	32.600	9	33.300
2024	Olympics	Paris	Formidable by Giordana Angi	Ball	5	33.150	8	32.750
2024	Olympics	Paris	Don't tell mama by Natasha Richardson, Alan Cumming and Cabaret Ensemble (1998)	Clubs	9	32.500	11	30.900
2024	Olympics	Paris	Can you hear the music by Ludwig Göransson and The game is afoot by Eternal Eclipse	Ribbon	8	31.450	6	32.300

== Competitive highlights ==
(Team competitions in seniors are held only at the World Championships, Europeans and other Continental Games.)

International: Senior
Year	Event	AA	Team	Hoop	Ball	Clubs	Ribbon
2024	Aeon Cup	8th	3rd				
2024	Olympic Games	8th					
2024	World Cup Milan	16th		22nd (Q)	14th (Q)	11th(Q)	18th(Q)
2024	European Championships	6th	2nd	OC	10th(Q)	5th	14th(Q)
2024	European Cup Baku	7th		10th(Q)	10th(Q)	9th(Q)	9th(Q)
2024	World Cup Sofia	18th		17th (Q)	17th (Q)	25th(Q)	11th(Q)
2024	World Cup Athens	23rd		25th (Q)	40th (Q)	8th	21st (Q)
2023	World Championships Valencia	13th	3rd	10th (Q)	22nd (Q)	11th (Q)	25th (Q)
2023	World Cup Milan	15th		11th (Q)	9th (Q)	14th (Q)	34th (Q)
2023	World Challenge Cup Cluj-Napoca	6th		10th(Q)	2nd	18th(Q)	7th
2023	European Championships Baku	OC	4th	OC	OC	OC	5th
2023	World Cup Baku	30th		21st(Q)	40th(Q)	48th(Q)	11(th)
2023	World Cup Sofia	12th		20th(Q)	7th	17th(Q)	8th
2023	World Cup Athens	13th		17th(Q)	11th(Q)	19th(Q)	14th(Q)
2022	Aeon Cup	3rd	1st				
2022	World Championships Sofia	5th	1st	8th	3rd	15th(Q)	20th(Q)
2022	World Challenge Cup Cluj-Napoca	5th		12th(Q)	3rd	5th	4th
2022	World Games 2022			9th(Q)	4th	6th	6th
2022	European Championships Tel Aviv	7th	2nd	12th(Q)	7th	24th(Q)	10th(Q)
2022	World Cup Pesaro	2nd		5th	7th	6th	6th
2022	World Cup Baku	3rd		12th(Q)	2nd	4th	4th
2022	World Cup Sofia	4th		4th	3rd	5th	4th
2021	World Championships Kitakyushu	9th	2nd	5th	6th	6th	
2021	Olympic Games	6th					
2021	World Challenge Cup Cluj-Napoca	2nd		4th	4th	4th	2nd
2021	World Cup Baku	8th		13th(Q)	11th(Q)	5th	17th(Q)
2021	World Cup Sofia	22nd		33rd (Q)	10th (Q)	19th(Q)	31st (Q)
2019	World Championships	7th	4th	9th(Q)	4th	21st (Q)	8th
2019	World Cup Portimao	2nd		5th	1st	2nd	1st
2019	World Cup Kazan	7th		24th(Q)	4th	6th	9th(Q)
2019	World Cup Minsk	9th		4th	22nd(Q)	9th(Q)	3rd
2019	European Championships	5th	4th	28th (Q)	6th	13th(Q)	7th
2019	World Cup Guadalajara	8th		18th (Q)	4th	4th	22nd(Q)
2019	World Cup Baku	9th		12th (Q)	13th (Q)	7th	14th (Q)
2019	World Cup Sofia	12th		13th (Q)	9th (Q)	10th (Q)	23rd(Q)
2019	World Cup Pesaro	11th		7th	5th	15th (Q)	19th (Q)
2018	World Championships	7th	3rd	6th	4th	4th	2nd
2018	World Cup Kazan	6th		7th		8th	5th
2018	World Cup Minsk	12th		16th (Q)	15th (Q)	11th (Q)	15th (Q)
2018	Rhythmic gymnastics at the 2018 Mediterranean Games	3rd					
2018	European Championships	7th		9th(Q)	8th(Q)	5th(Q)	14th(Q)
2018	World Cup Guadalajara	4th		5th	2nd	3rd	5th
2018	World Cup Baku	8th		10th (Q)	9th (Q)	10th (Q)	6th
2018	World Cup Pesaro	9th		9th (Q)	11th (Q)	26th (Q)	6th
2018	World Cup Sofia	12th		5th	30th (Q)	13th (Q)	15th (Q)
2017	World Championships	9th		23rd(Q)	16th(Q)	12th(Q)	6th
2017	World Cup Minsk	8th		9th (Q)	4th	10th (Q)	7th
2017	European Championships			11th(Q)	33rd(Q)	7th	
2017	World Cup Sofia	10th		13th(Q)	9th (Q)	10th (Q)	16th (Q)
International: Junior
Year	Event	AA	Team	Rope	Hoop	Ball	Clubs
2018	Junior European Championships	3rd	22nd (Q)	7th	6th	6th	
2016	Junior World Cup Sofia				3rd	1st	
National
Year	Event	AA	Team	Hoop	Ball	Clubs	Ribbon
2024	Italian National Championships	2nd		3rd	2nd	3rd	3rd
2023	Italian National Championships	2nd		2nd	2nd	3rd	2nd
2022	Italian National Championships	2nd		2nd	2nd	2nd	2nd
2021	Italian National Championships	1st		1st	2nd	2nd	2nd
2020	Italian National Championships	1st		1st	1st	2nd	1st
2019	Italian National Championships	2nd		1st	2nd	2nd	2nd
2018	Italian National Championships	1st		1st	1st	2nd	1st
2017	Italian National Championships	3rd		2nd	2nd	4th	1st
2016	Italian National Championships				3rd	3rd	
Q = Qualifications (Did not advance to Event Final due to the 2 gymnast per country rule, only Top 8 highest score); WR = World Record; WD = Withdrew; NT = No Team Competition; OC = Out of Competition(competed but scores not counted for qualifications/results)

== Routine music information ==
Year	Apparatus	Music title
2024	Hoop	Hit The Road Jack (Epic Cover) by 2WEI
2024	Ball	Formidable by Giordana Angi
2024	Clubs	Don't tell mama by Natasha Richardson, Alan Cumming and Cabaret Ensemble (1998)
2024	Ribbon	Can you hear the music by Ludwig Göransson and The game is afoot by Eternal Eclipse
2023	Hoop	La casa azul by Marco Mengoni
2023	Ball	Not my Responsibility by Billie Eilish
2023	Clubs	Some Like It Hot by Club des Belugas
2023	Ribbon	L’enfer by Stromae
2022	Hoop (first)	Ave Maria by Thomas Spencer Wortley
2022	Hoop (second)	The First Wave by Jon Björk, Over the Rainbow by Petra Magoni
2022	Ball	The Trapper and the Furrier by Regina Spektor
2022	Clubs	Mercenaries (Bridgerton Teaser Soundtrack) by Alloy Tracks
2022	Ribbon	I Put A Spell On You by Garou
2021	Hoop (first)	The Weeping Mountains, War Cry by Inro Joo
2021	Hoop (second)	Mephisto's Lullaby by Yair Albeg Wein & Or Kribos
2021	Ball	L'immensità by Mina
2021	Clubs	Bury a Friend by Billie Eilish
2021	Ribbon	Elegie: O doux printemps d'autrefois by Joshua Bell
2020	Hoop	The Weeping Mountains, War Cry by Inro Joo
2020	Ball	Youkali by Mario Frangoulis
2020	Clubs	Bury a Friend by Billie Eilish
2020	Ribbon	Vivaldi Storm by 2Cellos
2019	Hoop	Dance With the Dragon by Dark Sarah ft. Jp Leppäluoto
2019	Ball	Non Andare Via by Petra Magoni
2019	Clubs	Moonlight Sonata by Ludwig van Beethoven
2019	Ribbon (first)	Beetlejuice (Main Titles / End Titles) by Danny Elfman
2019	Ribbon (second)	Basic Instinct (The Games Are Over) by Jerry Goldsmith
2018	Hoop	Zhulto by Desi Dobreva
2018	Ball	Après Moi by Regina Spektor
2018	Clubs	Carmen by Stromae
2018	Ribbon	Carol Of The Bells by Tommee Profit
2017	Hoop	I will survive by Igudesman & Joo
2017	Ball	Guarda che luna by Petra Magoni
2017	Clubs	Retrolonga by Electrocutango
2017	Ribbon	Paris sera toujours paris by Zaz
2016	Rope	Danza Ritual Del Fuego by Paco De Lucía
2016	Hoop	I will survive by Igudesman & Joo
2016	Ball	Guarda che luna by Petra Magoni
2016	Clubs	Monde Inversé by Cirque Du Soleil
