= Alexandra Agiurgiuculese =

Italian rhythmic gymnast (born 2001)

- Full name: Alexandra Ana Maria Agiurgiuculese
- Nicknames: Alex, Agiurgiu
- Born: 15 January 2001 (age 25) Iași, Romania

Gymnastics career
- Discipline: Rhythmic gymnastics
- Country represented: Italy; ((2015-present))
- Former countries represented: Romania
- Club: San Giorgio Desio
- Head coach: Elena Aliprandi
- Former coaches: Špela Dragaš, Magda Pigano
- Eponymous skills: The Agiurgiuculese (Ag Jump): turning split leap with ring of the back leg, take off and landing on the same leg (jete en tournant)
- World ranking: 22 WC 6 WCC (2017 Season)
Medal record
Event	1st	2nd	3rd
World Championships	0	1	2
Mediterranean Games	1	0	0
FIG World Cup	3	6	5
Total	4	7	7
Representing Italy
Rhythmic Gymnastics
World Championships
Silver medal – second place	2021 Kitakyushu	Team
Bronze medal – third place	2018 Sofia	Ball
Bronze medal – third place	2018 Sofia	Team
Mediterranean Games
Gold medal – first place	2018 Tarragona	All-around
Junior European Championships
Silver medal – second place	2016 Holon	Ball
Silver medal – second place	2016 Holon	Clubs
Bronze medal – third place	2016 Holon	Rope
Bronze medal – third place	2016 Holon	Team
- Last updated on: 7 June 2026.

Alexandra Ana Maria Agiurgiuculese (born 15 January 2001) is a Romanian-Italian individual rhythmic gymnast who represents Italy. She is a World Championships silver and bronze medalist, and she competed at the 2020 Summer Olympics. Agiurgiuculese was the first Italian gymnast to win the Longines Prize for Elegance.

On the national level, she is the 2019 Italian National all-around champion and three-time (2017, 2018, 2020) Italian National all-around silver medalist.

== Personal life ==
Agiurgiuculese was born in Iași, Romania. She has a brother, Sebastian Constantin, and a sister, Madalina. Her father worked at a factory in Italy and sent money to the family in Romania, and her mother and brothers later joined him. She lived in Romania from ages 8 to 10 with her grandparents and trained with the Romanian National rhythmic gymnastics team. She moved to Martignacco, where she attended middle school and later lived first with her coach, Špela Dragaš, in Udine for 4 years. Agiurgiuculese speaks Romanian, Italian, and English.

She joined the Aeronautica Militare at 17 and is a first airman as of 2020. She lived in Udine until she moved to Desio in late 2021.

== Gymnastics career ==
=== Junior ===
Representing Romania, Agiurgiuculese won the national competitions in Romania and competed in numerous international events, such as at the 2011 Irina Delanu Cup and 2010 Miss Valentine Cup.

In 2012, Agiurgiuculese began to represent Italy. She won the junior national championships in 2012, 2013 and 2015. At the 2014 MTM Ljubljana, she won gold in ball and silver in hoop, clubs, and ribbon. She also competed at the Italian Serie A. She competed at the 2015 Moscow Junior Grand Prix, finishing 8th in the all-around. She won the all-around gold at the 2015 MTM Cup in Ljubljana.

Agiurgiuculese competed at the 2016 Lisboa Junior World Cup. She won bronze in ball and finished 8th in rope, 7th in hoop, and 4th in clubs. She won silver in rope and bronze in hoop and ball at the 2016 Pesaro Junior World Cup. At the 2016 Sofia Junior World Cup, Italy won the team bronze, and Agiurgiuculese took silver in ball and finished 4th in clubs. At the 2016 European Junior Championships, Italy won team bronze, and Agiurgiuculese qualified to all apparatus finals. She won silver in ball and clubs and bronze in rope, and she finished 4th in hoop.

=== Senior ===
==== 2017 ====
In 2017 season, Agiurgiuculese made her senior international debut at the 2017 Grand Prix Moscow. She was 8th in the all-around, and she qualified to all the apparatus finals, placing 5th in clubs, 6th in hoop, 7th in ball and 8th in ribbon. She competed at the 2017 Pesaro World Cup and finished 13th all-around and qualified to two apparatus finals, where she won bronze with ribbon and placed 4th with ball. On 5–7 May Agiurgiuculese competed at the 2017 Sofia World Cup, finishing 13th in the all-around. She qualified for two apparatus finals, and she won a silver medal in ball and finished 8th in ribbon. On 19–21 May, Agiurgiuculese, along with teammates Milena Baldassarri and Alessia Russo, represented the individual seniors for Italy at the 2017 European Championships. She qualified for the ball final, but she finished in last place.

Agiurgiuculese won silver in the all-around at the Italian National Championships behind Veronica Bertolini. On 7–9 July Agiurgiuculese finished just out of the medals with 4th place in the all-around at the 2017 Berlin World Challenge Cup. She qualified for three apparatus final and took a silver medal in hoop and placed 5th in ball and 4th in ribbon. On 5–7 August Agiurgiuculese finished 7th in the all-around behind Bulgaria's Katrin Taseva at the 2017 Minsk World Challenge Cup and qualified for three apparatus finals. She won bronze in ball and finished 6th in hoop and 8th in clubs. On 11–13 August, Agiurgiuculese competed at the 2017 Kazan World Challenge Cup. She was 10th in the all-around and competed in three apparatus finals. In the apparatus finals, she finished 8th in hoop, 5th in ball, and 6th in clubs.

Together with Milena Baldassarri, Agiurgiuculese represented Italy in the individual competition at the 2017 World Rhythmic Gymnastics Championships in Pesaro, where she finished 8th In the All-around behind Neviana Vladinova. She also qualified for three apparatus finals and finished 7th in ball, 5th in clubs and 4th in ribbon. Agiurgiuculese was awarded the Longines Prize for Elegance at the games; she was the first Italian gymnast to win the award.

==== 2018 ====
In 2018, she started her season competing at the MTM Ljubljana tournament, where she finished 4th in the all-around behind Julia Evchik. On 13–15 April Agiurgiuculese competed at the 2018 Pesaro World Cup, finishing in a disappointing 17th position. On 27–29 April Agiurgiuculese then competed at the 2018 Baku World Cup, where she finished 16th in the all-around. On 4–6 May she competed at the 2018 Guadalajara World Challenge Cup. She finished 8th in the all-around. In her two apparatus finals, she was 5th in clubs and 8th in ribbon. On 15–17 May Agiurgiuculese competed at the Holon Senior International tournament, where she won gold in the all-around with a total of 66.300 points. On 29–30 June she competed at the 2018 Mediterranean Games in Tarragona, Spain, where she won the gold all-around medal with a total of 71.150 points.

At the 2018 World Championships, Alexandra won a historic bronze medal in the ball final with a score of 19.900. Her bronze medal was the first individual medal for Italy in 27 years at the World Championships.

==== 2019 ====
In 2019, on June 22, she represented Romania at the 2019 European Games in Minsk, Belarus and finished on 4th place in All-around behind Katsiaryna Halkina from Belarus. She was 5th in Hoop, 6th in Ball and Clubs and 6th in Ribbon final. Agiurgiuculese represented Italy at the 2019 World Championships in Baku, Azerbaijan together with Milena Baldassarri, Alessia Russo and Sofia Maffeis. Italy placed 4th in the team competition. Agiurgiuculese placed 7th in the all-around qualifications and qualified to the hoop and clubs finals. In the all-around final, she ended in 6th place and secured an Olympic spot for Italy at the 2020 Summer Olympics in Tokyo, Japan. She also placed 6th in the hoop final and 5th in the clubs final. During her ball exercise at the 2019 World Championships, she performed an original body difficulty element, a turning leap which was named "The Agiurguiculese" after her.

==== 2021 ====
In 2021, she started her season by competing at the FIG Ritam Cup in Belgrade, Serbia, where she finished 1st in the all-around. On 7–9 May she then competed at the 2021 Baku World Cup, finishing 4th in the all-around. At the 2020 Olympic Games, she finished fifteenth in the qualification round for the individual all-around and did not advance to the final.

==== 2022-2023 ====
In 2022, just after her birthday, it was confirmed that she left her coach Špela Dragaš from ASU Udinese and moved to Desio. In April, she competed at World Cup Tashkent, placing 7th in all-around. She took 4th place at Italian Championships and won bronze medal in ribbon final.

In 2023, Agiurgiuculese competed at World Challenge Cup Portimão and ended on 7th place in all-around. She represented Italy at the 2023 European Championships in Baku, Azerbaijan, taking 12th place in all-around and 8th in clubs final. In July that year she was given a one-year due to missing three anti-doping test appointments; she claimed that she had forgotten to properly update her whereabouts for testing because she was fatigued from travel. The suspension meant that she could not participate in the 2024 Summer Olympics.

==== 2026 ====
She was supposed to return to gymnastics in January 2025, but decided to extend the break from training. She explained this in a video published on January 15 in 2026, where she announced her comeback to competitive sport.

In April, she competed at Italian Championships in Gold category, and won silver medal in all-around behind Margherita Fucci. This was a qualification step that allowed her to compete at Italian Championships in elite category. In June, she competed at Italian National Championships and took 4th place in all-around. In October, she competed in the first round of the Italian Serie A with San Giorgio 79 Desio and took 5th place.

== Eponymous skill ==
Agiurgiuculese has one eponymous skill listed in the code of points, a turning leap in a split position with ring (back leg bent with head bent toward foot), with the take-off and landing on the same leg. She is the first Italian rhythmic gymnast to have an eponymous skill.

Name	Description	Difficulty (Note: Valid for the 2022-2024 Code of Points)
Agiurgiuculese	Turning split leap with ring, take-off and landing on the same leg (Jete en tournant)	0.6

== Achievements ==
- First Italian individual rhythmic gymnast to win a medal in an individual apparatus final at the FIG World Cup series.
- First Italian individual rhythmic gymnast to win a medal in an individual all-around at the FIG World Cup series.
- First Italian individual rhythmic gymnast to win a gold medal in an individual apparatus final at the FIG World Cup series.
- First Italian individual rhythmic gymnast to win a medal in an individual apparatus final at the World Championships.
- First to perform the original body difficulty element, a turning split leap with ring of the back leg and take off and landing on the same leg, named "The Agiurguiculese" or "The Ag."

== Routine music information ==
Year	Apparatus	Music title
2016	Clubs	Batucada / Besame Mucho (Dub Mix) by The Booty Jocks / Buddha Bar
2016	Ball	Your Love by Ennio Morricone & Dulce Pontes
2016	Hoop	Black Skinhead/Personal Jesus by Kanye West/Marilyn Manson
2016	Rope	Hava Nagila by DJ Jacob
2017	Ribbon	Va Pensiero by Albano Carrisi (former), The Wall/ Another One Bites the Dust by Pink Floyd/ Queen
2017	Clubs	Pharaoh by Snavs
2017	Ball	Hallelujah by Susan Boyle
2017	Hoop	Earthshaker/ Army of Drummers by Audiomachine
2018	Ribbon	The Wall/ Another One Bites the Dust by Pink Floyd/ Queen
2018	Clubs	Habibi Min Zaman, Manea-K by Balkan Beat Box, Max Pashm
2018	Ball	Zajdi, zajdi by Amira Medunjanin
2018	Hoop	Gangsta's Paradise by 2WEI
2019	Ribbon	La Cumparsita by Milva
2019	Clubs	Area by Magnus the Magnus
2019	Ball	House of the Rising Sun by Heavy Young Heathens
2019	Hoop	The Ecstasy of Gold by Ennio Morricone
2020	Hoop	Für Elise by Hidden Citizens
2020	Ball	Coro a Bocca Chiusa from Madama Butterfly by Filippa Giordano
2020	Clubs	Tokyo Drift by Teriyaki Boyz
2020	Ribbon	You're the One That I Want by Alex & Sierra, Olivia Newton-John
2020	Rope	Bury a Friend by Billie Eilish
2021	Hoop	Für Elise by Hidden Citizens
2021	Ball	Rinascita by ?
2021	Clubs	Tokyo Drift by Teriyaki Boyz
2021	Ribbon	You're The One That I Want by Alex & Sierra, Olivia Newton-John
2022/2023	Hoop	Seasoned Oak / Zhelka by Daniel Pemberton / Elitsa Todorova
2022/2023	Ball	La donna cannone by Francesco De Gregori
2022/2023	Clubs	I Will Follow Him by God's Angels
2022/2023	Ribbon	Can't Help Falling in Love [dark version] by Tommee Profitt, brooke
2026	Hoop	Fearless Living by Brain Delgado
2026	Ball	Disfruto by Carla Morrison
2026	Clubs	
2026	Ribbon	Swing Rave by Farbwende

== Competitive highlights ==
(Team competitions in seniors are held only at the World Championships, Europeans and other Continental Games.)

International: Senior
Year	Event	AA	Team	Hoop	Ball	Clubs	Ribbon
2023	European Championships	12th	4th	15th (Q)	17th (Q)	8th	
2023	World Challenge Cup Portimão	7th		13th (Q)	8th	6th	4th
2022	World Challenge Cup Pamplona	12th		7th	14th (Q)	12th (Q)	11th (Q)
2022	World Cup Tashkent	7th		6th	10th (Q)	9th (Q)	4th
2021	World Championships		2nd		16th (Q)		6th
2021	World Challenge Cup Cluj-Napoca	7th		6th	3rd	11th	3rd
2021	Olympic Games	15th (Q)					
2021	World Cup Pesaro	13th		23rd (Q)	9th (Q)	7th	24th (Q)
2021	World Cup Baku	4th		7th	1st	4th	8th
2021	FIG Ritam Cup	1st		1st	1st	1st	1st
2019	World Championships	6th	4th	6th	9th (Q)	5th	36th (Q)
2019	World Cup Portimao	4th		1st	2nd	1st	14th (Q)
2019	World Cup Cluj-Napoca	11th		4th	15th (Q)	29th (Q)	2nd
2019	World Cup Minsk	4th		7th	6th	5th	6th
2019	European Games	4th		5th	6th	6th	6th
2019	European Championships		4th	9th (Q)	15th (Q)	12th (Q)	21st (Q)
2019	World Cup Guadalajara	3rd		6th	3rd	2nd	3rd
2019	World Cup Baku	10th		10th (Q)	16th (Q)	8th	12th (Q)
2019	World Cup Pesaro	10th		9th (Q)	19th (Q)	2nd	10th (Q)
2019	MTM Ljubljana Tournament	1st		3rd	1st	1st	2nd
2018	World Championships	9th	3rd	14th (Q)	3rd	10th (Q)	4th
2018	World Cup Kazan	7th		12th (Q)	5th	6th	11th (Q)
2018	World Cup Minsk	11th		13th (Q)	9th (Q)	12th (Q)	13th (Q)
2018	European Championships	8th	NT				
2018	World Cup Guadalajara	8th		10th (Q)	5th	5th	8th
2018	World Cup Baku	16th		21st (Q)	14th (Q)	16th (Q)	14th (Q)
2018	World Cup Pesaro	17th		12th (Q)	48th (Q)	9th (Q)	9th (Q)
2018	MTM Ljubljana Tournament	4th		16th (Q)	1st	1st	1st
National
Year	Event	AA	Team	Hoop	Ball	Clubs	Ribbon
2026	Italian National Championships	4th		13th (Q)	8th	7th	8th
2022	Italian National Championships	4th		3rd	7th (Q)	5th	11th (Q)
2021	Italian National Championships	3rd					
2020	Italian National Championships	2nd	3rd	2nd	11th (Q)	2nd	6th
2019	Italian National Championships	1st	1st	2nd	1st	3rd	1st
2018	Italian National Championships	2nd	2nd	3rd	1st	2nd	2nd
2017	Italian National Championships	2nd	1st	4th	2nd	3rd	2nd

== See also ==
- Nationality changes in gymnastics
