= List of football stadiums in Belarus =

The following is a list of football stadiums in Belarus, ranked in order of capacity, with the minimum capacity being 4,000.

== Current stadiums ==
#	Image	Stadium	Capacity	City	Home team	UEFA rank
1		National Football Stadium	33,000	Minsk	Belarus national football team	4/4 stars
2		Dinamo Stadium	22,246	Minsk	Belarus national football team and Dynama Minsk	4/4 stars
3		Traktor Stadium	17,600	Minsk	Isloch and FC Minsk	
4		Central Stadium	14,307	Homieĺ	FC Gomel	
5		Borisov Arena	13,121	Barysaŭ	BATE Borisov	4/4 stars
6		Brestsky	10,169	Brest	Dynama Brest and Ruch Brest	
7		Neman Stadium	8,479	Hrodna	FC Neman Grodno	
8		Vitebsky	8,144	Vitebsk	FC Vitebsk	
9		Spartak	7,350	Mogilev	Dnepr Mogilev	
10		Torpedo	6,524	Zhodzina	Torpedo-BelAZ Zhodino	
11		City Stadium	5,402	Borisov	FC Smolevichi	
12		Torpedo Stadium	5,200	Minsk		
13		Yunost	5,133	Mozyr	Slavia Mozyr	
14		City Stadium	4,560	Maladziečna	Energetik-BGU Minsk and FC Molodechno	
15		Atlant	4,520	Novopolotsk	FC Naftan Novopolotsk	
16		Budaŭnik	4,200	Salihorsk	Shakhtyor Soligorsk	

== See also ==
- Football in Belarus
- List of European stadiums by capacity
- List of association football stadiums by capacity
- List of association football stadiums by country
- List of sports venues by capacity
- List of stadiums by capacity
- Lists of stadiums
