= Rhythmic gymnastics at the 2018 Mediterranean Games =

- Venue: Pavelló Olímpic de Reus
- Dates: 29–30 June
- Competitors: 26 from 11 nations

The rhythmic gymnastics competitions at the 2018 Mediterranean Games took place between 29 and 30 June at the Pavelló Olímpic de Reus in Reus.

Athletes competed in 1 event, women's individual all-around.

== Medal summary ==
Event	Gold	Silver	Bronze
Individual all-around	Alexandra Agiurgiuculese; Italy	Eleni Kelaiditi; Greece	Milena Baldassarri; Italy

== Participating nations ==
Eleven nations have applied to compete in rhythmic gymnastics.

- Andorra (3)
- Bosnia and Herzegovina (3)
- Cyprus (3)
- Egypt (2)
- Greece (2)
- Italy (3)
- Portugal (2)
- Serbia (1)
- Slovenia (2)
- Spain (2)
- Turkey (3)
