= Minsk-Arena =

Indoor arena in Belarus

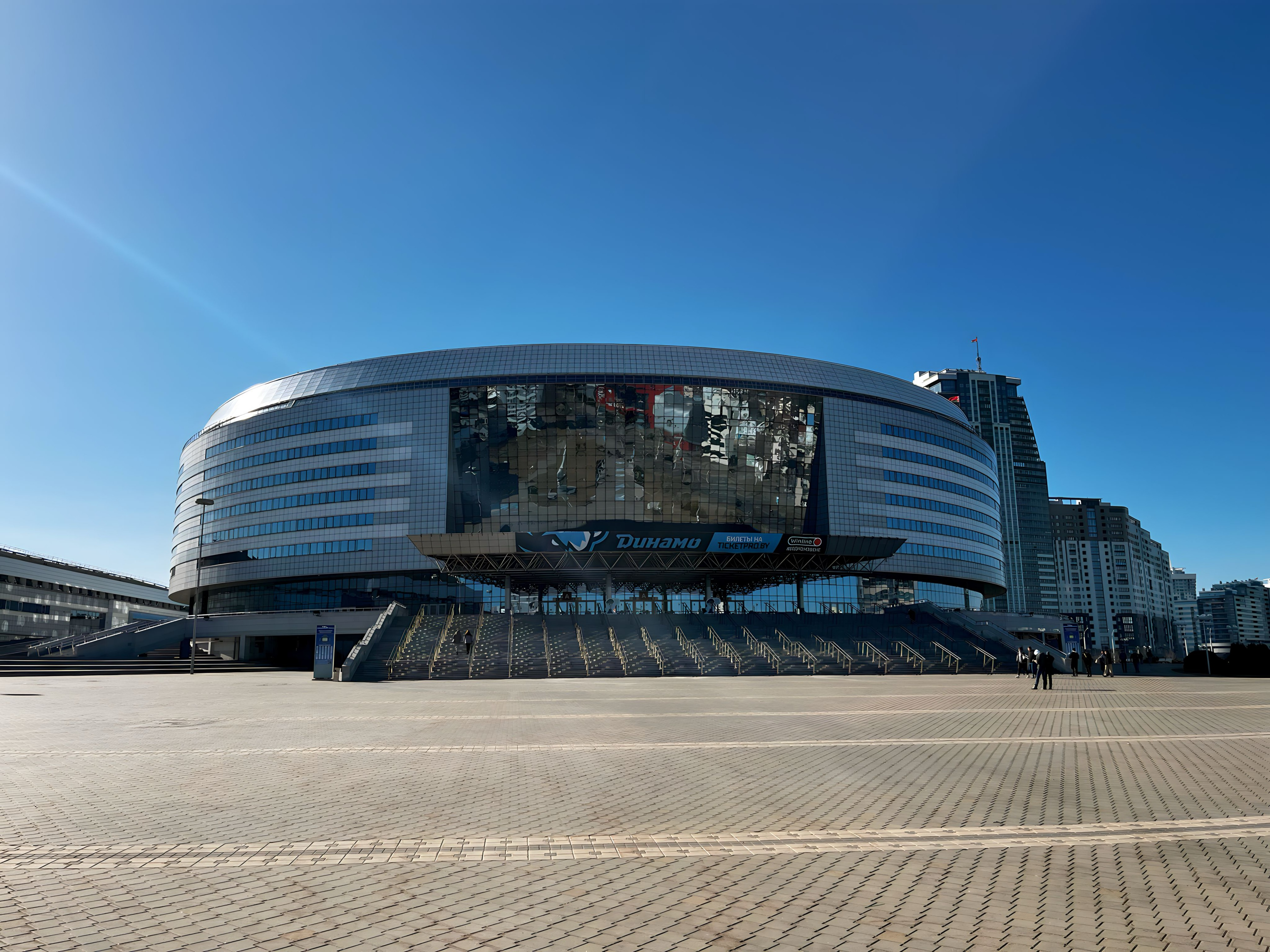
- Minsk Arena in March 2024
- Interactive map of Minsk-Arena
- Location: Minsk, Belarus
- Coordinates: 53.9365°N 27.4829°E
- Owner: Ministry of Sports and Tourism of the Republic of Belarus
- Operator: The Main Department of Sports and Tourism of the Minsk City Executive Committee
- Capacity: Ice hockey:15,086 (main arena)
- Acreage: 72,579 sq.m (main arena)

Construction
- Groundbreaking: 2006
- Built: 2006–2009
- Opened: 30 January 2010; 16 years ago
- Cost: $ 350 million ($174,7 million main arena)
- Architects: V. Kutsko, V. Budaev, A. Nitievsky, A. Shabalin (Institute Belgosproect)
- General contractor: Minskpromstroy LLC

Tenants
- HC Dinamo Minsk; BC Tsmoki-Minsk

Website
- www.minskarena.by

Minsk Arena (Belarusian: Мінск-Арэна, Russian: Минск-Арена) is the main indoor arena in Minsk, Belarus. The Minsk-Arena complex includes the main multi-purpose arena (capable of hosting 15,000 spectators) with an open multi-level parking lot (with 1,080 parking spaces) alongside an interconnected 2,000-seat velodrome and a 3,000-seat speed skating rink.

== Complex venues ==
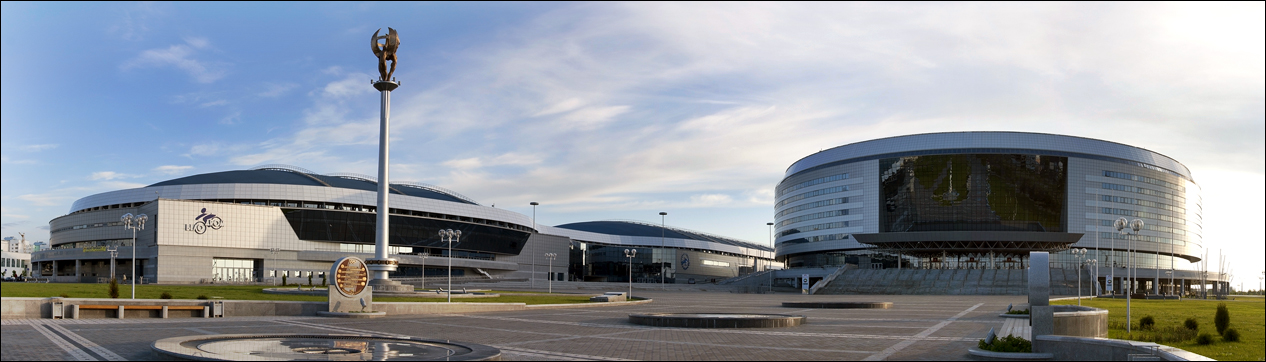
The multi-venue complex in April 2010 (Left: velodrome, right: speed skating rink and arena)

Minsk-Arena was created by the decree of the President of the Republic of Belarus on the construction of a multi-disciplinary sports complex, which was issued at the end of 2005. Construction work began in the spring of 2006. The general designer of the complex was "Bilproekt", and the general contractor was "Minskprombud".

The Minsk Arena Velodrome opened on 30 December 2008 and can accommodate 2,000 spectators. Owned by the city of Minsk, the velodrome was designed by the architectural firm Schuermann and Belgos Projekt. The length of the cycling track is 250 m and its surface is made of Siberian spruce wood and is directly connected to the indoor skating rink which opened on 30 January 2010. In February 2013, the 2013 UCI Track Cycling World Championships were held in the velodrome. In June 2019, the facility hosted track cycling competitions as part of the 2019 European Games.

The Minsk Arena speed skating hall with a 400-meter track is the first indoor speed skating hall in Belarus. The ice surface has a total area of around 10,000 m2, of which 5,000 m2 is the speed skating rink. Inside the track there are two ice hockey fields (60×30 m and 60×28 m) and two curling fields. Training can be carried out under altitude training conditions in a special room. To do this, the air pressure is lowered and the oxygen content in the air is reduced.

== Events ==
=== Entertainment ===
It was the host venue for the Junior Eurovision Song Contest 2010 and 2018.

Several notable people have performed in the arena. Colombian singer Shakira performed during her The Sun Comes Out World Tour on 19 May 2011. Jennifer Lopez performed during her Dance Again World Tour on 25 September 2012. Armin Van Buuren performed on 7 March 2013 as part of a celebration to commemorate 600 episodes of A State of Trance. Lana Del Rey performed during her Paradise Tour on 12 June 2013. Depeche Mode performed on 29 July 2013 and on 28 February 2014 during their Delta Machine Tour. They performed again on 13 February 2018 for their Global Spirit Tour. French singer Mylène Farmer performed on 27 October 2013. Linkin Park performed their first and only show in the country on 27 August, 2015, as part of The Hunting Party Tour. Comedian Rolilney Biong performed on 19 October 2019 during his European Tour.

=== Sports ===
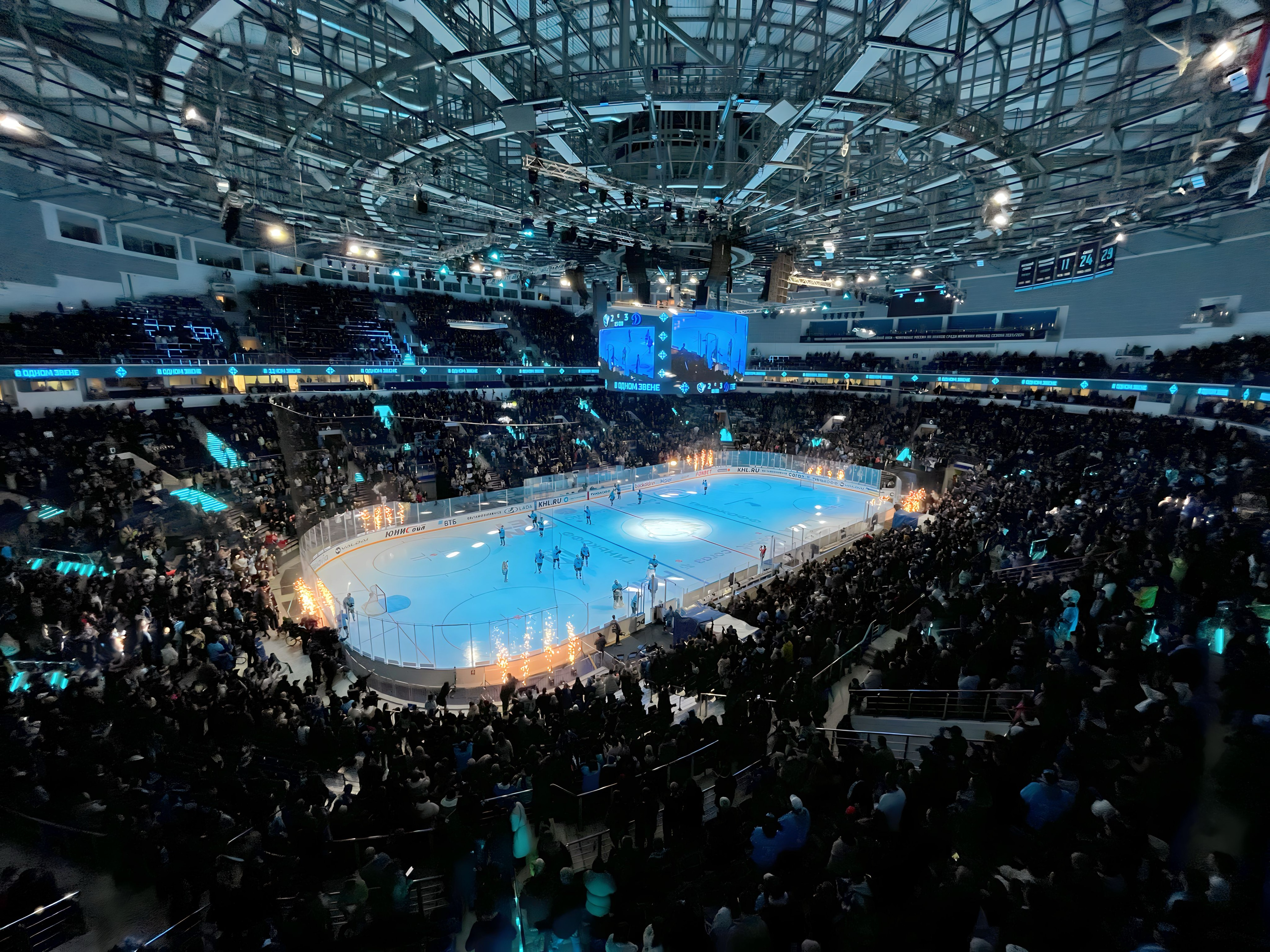
Main arena during a hockey match in 12 March 2024

One of the primary uses of the facility is ice hockey, as the building is the home rink of HC Dinamo Minsk of the Kontinental Hockey League. The arena replaced the much smaller Minsk Sports Palace built in 1966 with around 3,300 seats, in which Dinamo had used as their home arena since its founding in 2004. The arena's official opening was held on 30 January 2010 when the 2nd Kontinental Hockey League All-Star Game was held there. However, the first match in the facility had already been played by Dinamo Minsk on 14 January 2010 against Metallurg Magnitogorsk. It was one of two main venues for the 2014 IIHF World Championship.

In January 2016, the 2016 European Speed Skating Championships were held. In January 2016, the venue hosted the tournament eSports Starladder i-League Season 13, which included games such as Dota 2 and Counter-Strike: Global Offensive.

== See also ==
- List of cycling tracks and velodromes
- List of indoor speed skating rinks
- List of indoor arenas in Belarus
- List of European ice hockey arenas
- List of indoor arenas by capacity

Preceded by Hisense Arena; Melbourne	UCI Track Cycling World Championships; Venue; 2013	Succeeded by Velódromo Alcides Nieto Patiño; Cali
Preceded by Palace of Sports; Kyiv	Junior Eurovision Song Contest; Venue; 2010	Succeeded by Karen Demirchyan Complex; Yerevan
Preceded by Olympic Palace; Tbilisi	Junior Eurovision Song Contest; Venue; 2018	Succeeded by Gliwice Arena; Gliwice
