= Eleni Kelaiditi =

Greek rhythmic gymnast

- Nickname: Eleni
- Born: 1 April 2000 (age 26) Cholargos, Greece
- Height: 164 cm (5 ft 5 in)

Gymnastics career
- Discipline: Rhythmic gymnastics
- Country represented: Greece (2014 - present)
- Club: Palaio Faliro "harmony"
- Head coach: Marina Fateeva
- Choreographer: Ralitza Vladimirova
- World ranking: 21 WCC (2017 Season)
Medal record
Representing Greece
Rhythmic Gymnastics
Mediterranean Games
Silver medal – second place	2018 Tarragona	All-around

Eleni Kelaiditi (Greek: Ελένη Κελαϊδίτη; born April 1, 2000, in Cholargos, Greece) is a Greek individual rhythmic gymnast. She is a two-time Greek Junior National all-around champion.

== Career ==
=== Junior ===
Kelaiditi began rhythmic gymnastics at 6 years of age, she competed in junior division at the 2014 Valentine Cup and 2015 Aphrodite Cup. Kelaiditi has competed in the Junior World Cup and Junior Grand Prix series. She competed at the 2014 European Junior Championships where she qualified to 3 apparatus finals placing 8th in hoop, ball and 4th in ribbon.

=== Senior ===
In 2016, Kelaiditi began competing in the senior international division. She competed at the 2016 Minsk World Cup finishing 14th in the all-around and at 2016 Guadalajara World Cup finishing 19th in all-around.

In 2017, Kelaiditi began her season competing at the 2017 Valentine Cup. At the 2017 Peasro World Cup, she finished 17th in the all-around and qualified to her first apparatus final in ribbon where she finished in 8th place. On May 5–7, Kelaiditi competed at the 2017 Sofia World Cup finishing 8th in the all-around ahead of Anastasiya Serdyukova, she qualified in 1 apparatus final in clubs finishing in 8th place. On May 19–21, Kelaiditi represented the individual senior for Greece at the 2017 European Championships. Kelaiditi competed at the quadrennial held 2017 World Games in Wrocław, Poland from July 20–30. On August 30 - September 3, at the 2017 World Championships in Pesaro, Italy; Kelaiditi finished 20th in the all-around finals behind Ukraine's Olena Diachenko.

At the 2018 World Championships in Sofia, Bulgaria, she placed 16th in All-around Qualifications and advanced into All-around Final, where she improved her result, and ended on 14th place.
