= Boxing at the 2019 European Games =

Boxing competitions

- Venue: Uruchie Sports Palace
- Dates: 21–30 June
- Competitors: 317 from 44 nations

At the 2019 European Games in Minsk, matches across fifteen weight categories in boxing were contested between 21 and 30 June 2019, of which ten were allocated to men and five were allocated to women.

In contrast to 2015, this tournament doubled up as the 2019 European Amateur Boxing Championships for men. For women, it remained a separate tournament.

== Qualification ==
There was a nominal allocation of 316 athlete quota places (256 men, 60 women) for boxing at the 2019 European Games.

For the men's tournament, each National Olympic Committee (NOC) could simply enter one athlete per category. For the women's tournament, qualification was limited to one athlete per category and determined by (in the following order):

- AIBA World Ranking list as of December 2018
- 2018 Women's European Amateur Boxing Championships placings (for unranked competitors)
- 2018 AIBA Women's World Boxing Championships placings (for unranked competitors not involved in the European Championships)

As the host NOC, Belarus was guaranteed athlete quota places for all fifteen categories. Five places (one per women's category) were reserved for universality allocations.

== Competition schedule ==
There were generally two sessions per day for the majority of the tournament - an afternoon session (A), starting at 14:00 FET; then an evening session (E), starting at 18:30 FET. The last two days had one session each, beginning at 16:00 & 12:00 FET respectively.

Boxers also had a rest day during the competition.

P	Preliminary rounds	¼	Quarterfinals	½	Semifinals	F	Final

Men
Date →	Fri 21		Sat 22		Sun 23		Mon 24		Tue 25		Wed 26		Thu 27	Fri 28		Sat 29	Sun 30
Event ↓	A	E	A	E	A	E	A	E	A	E	A	E	Rest day	A	E	A	A
Light flyweight					P					¼			Rest day		½		F
Flyweight					P			P			¼		Rest day	½		F	
Bantamweight	P						P				¼		Rest day		½		F
Lightweight				P					P			¼	Rest day	½		F	
Light welterweight						P			P			¼	Rest day		½		F
Welterweight	P		P					P			¼		Rest day	½		F	
Middleweight	P		P			P				¼			Rest day		½		F
Light heavyweight				P					P			¼	Rest day	½		F	
Heavyweight	P				P					¼			Rest day		½		F
Super heavyweight	P						P				¼		Rest day	½		F	

Women
Date →	Sun 23		Mon 24		Tue 25		Wed 26		Thu 27	Fri 28		Sat 29	Sun 30
Event ↓	A	E	A	E	A	E	A	E	Rest day	A	E	A	A
Flyweight		P						¼	Rest day		½		F
Featherweight			P				¼		Rest day	½		F	
Lightweight		P						¼	Rest day		½		F
Welterweight			P				¼		Rest day	½		F	
Middleweight						P		¼	Rest day		½		F

== Medalists ==
=== Men ===
Event	Gold	Silver	Bronze
49 kg (light fly)	Arthur Hovhannisyan; Armenia	Sakhil Alakhverdovi; Georgia	Regan Daly; Ireland Federico Serra; Italy
52 kg (fly)	Gabriel Escobar; Spain	Daniel Asenov; Bulgaria	Manuel Cappai; Italy Galal Yafai; Great Britain
56 kg (bantam)	Kurt Walker; Ireland	Mykola Butsenko; Ukraine	Peter McGrail; Great Britain Sharafa Raman; Germany
60 kg (light)	Dzmitry Asanau; Belarus	Gabil Mamedov; Russia	Karen Tonakanyan; Armenia Otar Eranosyan; Georgia
64 kg (light welter)	Hovhannes Bachkov; Armenia	Sofiane Oumiha; France	Enrico Lacruz; Netherlands Luke McCormack; Great Britain
69 kg (welter)	Pat McCormack; Great Britain	Khariton Agrba; Russia	Lorenzo Sotomayor; Azerbaijan Yevhenii Barabanov; Ukraine
75 kg (middle)	Oleksandr Khyzhniak; Ukraine	Salvatore Cavallaro; Italy	Andrej Csemez; Slovakia Michael Nevin; Ireland
81 kg (light heavy)	Loren Alfonso; Azerbaijan	Benjamin Whittaker; Great Britain	Simone Fiori; Italy Gor Nersesyan; Armenia
91 kg (heavy)	Muslim Gadzhimagomedov; Russia	Uladzislau Smiahlikau; Belarus	Toni Filipi; Croatia Cheavon Clarke; Great Britain
+91 kg (super heavy)	Victor Vykhryst; Ukraine	Mourad Aliev; France	Marko Milun; Croatia Nelvie Tiafack; Germany

=== Women ===
Event	Gold	Silver	Bronze
51 kg (fly)	Buse Naz Çakıroğlu; Turkey	Svetlana Soluianova; Russia	Sandra Drabik; Poland Gabriela Dimitrova; Bulgaria
57 kg (feather)	Stanimira Petrova; Bulgaria	Michaela Walsh; Ireland	Jemyma Betrian; Netherlands Daria Abramova; Russia
60 kg (light)	Mira Potkonen; Finland	Kellie Harrington; Ireland	Anastasia Belyakova; Russia Agnes Alexiusson; Sweden
69 kg (welter)	Karolina Koszewska; Poland	Assunta Canfora; Italy	Gráinne Walsh; Ireland Nadine Apetz; Germany
75 kg (middle)	Lauren Price; Great Britain	Nouchka Fontijn; Netherlands	Darima Sandakova; Russia Elżbieta Wójcik; Poland

== Medal tables ==
=== Overall ===
* Host nation (Belarus)

Rank	Nation	Gold	Silver	Bronze	Total
1	Great Britain	2	1	4	7
2	Ukraine	2	1	1	4
3	Armenia	2	0	2	4
4	Russia	1	3	3	7
5	Ireland	1	2	3	6
6	Bulgaria	1	1	1	3
7	Belarus*	1	1	0	2
8	Poland	1	0	2	3
9	Azerbaijan	1	0	1	2
10	Finland	1	0	0	1
10	Spain	1	0	0	1
10	Turkey	1	0	0	1
13	Italy	0	2	3	5
14	France	0	2	0	2
15	Netherlands	0	1	2	3
16	Georgia	0	1	1	2
17	Germany	0	0	3	3
18	Croatia	0	0	2	2
19	Slovakia	0	0	1	1
19	Sweden	0	0	1	1
Totals (20 entries)		15	15	30	60

=== Men's European Championships (European Amateur Boxing Championships) ===
* Host nation (Belarus)

Rank	Nation	Gold	Silver	Bronze	Total
1	Ukraine	2	1	1	4
2	Armenia	2	0	2	4
3	Russia	1	2	0	3
4	Great Britain	1	1	4	6
5	Belarus*	1	1	0	2
6	Ireland	1	0	2	3
7	Azerbaijan	1	0	1	2
8	Spain	1	0	0	1
9	France	0	2	0	2
10	Italy	0	1	3	4
11	Georgia	0	1	1	2
12	Bulgaria	0	1	0	1
13	Croatia	0	0	2	2
13	Germany	0	0	2	2
15	Netherlands	0	0	1	1
15	Slovakia	0	0	1	1
Totals (16 entries)		10	10	20	40

== Participating nations ==
A total of 317 athletes from 44 nations competed in boxing at the 2019 European Games:

NOC	Men										Women					Total
NOC	-49 kg	-52 kg	-56 kg	-60 kg	-64 kg	-69 kg	-75 kg	-81 kg	-91 kg	+91 kg	-51 kg	-57 kg	-60 kg	-69 kg	-75 kg	Total
Albania			X			X	X	X								4
Armenia	X	X	X	X	X	X	X	X	X	X	X					11
Austria				X		X	X	X	X							5
Azerbaijan	X	X	X	X	X	X	X	X	X	X				X		11
Belarus	X	X	X	X	X	X	X	X	X	X	X	X	X	X	X	15
Belgium			X		X	X	X	X	X							6
Bosnia and Herzegovina			X	X	X	X		X	X	X						7
Bulgaria	X	X	X	X	X	X	X	X	X	X	X	X	X			13
Croatia					X	X	X	X	X	X		X				7
Cyprus							X									1
Czech Republic				X	X		X	X			X			X		6
Denmark					X								X			2
Estonia		X		X	X	X		X	X							6
Finland				X			X		X				X	X		5
France		X	X	X	X	X	X	X		X		X		X		10
Georgia	X	X	X	X	X	X	X	X	X	X						10
Germany	X	X	X	X	X	X	X	X	X	X		X		X	X	13
Great Britain	X	X	X	X	X	X	X	X	X	X				X	X	12
Greece					X		X				X					3
Hungary	X	X	X	X	X	X	X	X	X	X				X	X	12
Ireland	X		X		X	X	X		X	X		X	X	X	X	11
Israel	X				X	X										3
Italy	X	X	X	X	X	X	X	X	X	X		X	X	X		13
Kosovo					X	X		X					X			4
Latvia						X				X						2
Lithuania				X			X			X						3
Luxembourg									X							1
Moldova			X	X	X	X	X	X	X	X			X			9
Monaco						X										1
Montenegro						X										1
Netherlands					X		X	X	X			X			X	6
North Macedonia				X		X	X									3
Norway						X	X	X			X					4
Poland	X		X	X	X	X	X	X	X	X	X		X	X	X	13
Romania	X	X	X	X		X		X	X	X	X	X				10
Russia	X	X	X	X	X	X	X	X	X	X	X	X	X	X	X	15
Serbia		X	X	X	X	X	X	X	X	X		X				10
Slovakia				X	X	X	X	X	X							6
Slovenia				X			X	X								3
Spain	X	X	X	X	X		X			X					X	8
Sweden							X	X					X		X	4
Switzerland			X			X	X	X								4
Turkey		X		X	X	X	X	X	X	X	X	X			X	11
Ukraine	X	X	X	X	X	X	X	X	X	X	X		X		X	13
44 NOCs	16	17	22	27	29	33	34	31	26	23	11	12	12	12	12	317
