= Wrestling at the 2019 European Games =

- Venue: Minsk Sports Palace
- Date: 25–30 June
- Competitors: 272 from 36 nations

The wrestling events at the 2019 European Games were held at the Minsk Sports Palace with a capacity 3,300 seats from 25 to 30 June. 18 events were held, six events in freestyle for men, six events for women, and six in the Greco-Roman style for men.

== Participating nations ==
NOC	Men												Women						Total
NOC	Freestyle						Greco-Roman						Freestyle						Total
NOC	57 kg	65 kg	74 kg	86 kg	97 kg	125 kg	60 kg	67 kg	77 kg	87 kg	97 kg	130 kg	50 kg	53 kg	57 kg	62 kg	68 kg	76 kg	Total
Albania		X																	1
Armenia	X	X			X	X	X	X	X	X	X								9
Austria			X			X		X			X			X				X	6
Azerbaijan	X	X	X	X	X	X	X	X		X	X	X	X		X	X	X	X	16
Belarus	X	X	X	X	X	X	X	X	X	X	X	X	X	X	X	X	X	X	18
Bulgaria	X		X	X	X		X	X	X		X		X		X	X	X	X	13
Croatia							X		X	X		X							4
Czech Republic												X			X		X		3
Estonia			X				X					X						X	4
Finland						X					X	X							3
France		X							X		X		X	X	X	X			7
Georgia	X	X	X	X	X	X	X	X	X	X	X	X							12
Germany			X	X	X	X	X	X	X		X	X		X		X	X	X	13
Great Britain																		X	1
Greece			X	X	X	X				X			X	X	X			X	9
Hungary		X			X	X	X	X	X	X	X			X	X	X		X	12
Israel				X															1
Italy	X	X					X						X		X		X		6
Latvia						X							X				X		3
Lithuania					X					X		X			X	X	X	X	7
Moldova	X	X		X	X	X	X		X	X			X	X	X	X			12
Netherlands														X					1
North Macedonia	X	X			X														3
Norway								X			X	X		X	X			X	6
Poland		X	X	X	X	X		X	X	X		X	X	X	X	X	X	X	15
Portugal								X											1
Romania	X		X	X		X	X			X		X	X	X		X	X	X	12
Russia	X	X	X	X	X	X	X	X	X	X	X	X	X	X		X	X	X	17
San Marino				X															1
Serbia	X							X	X	X	X								5
Slovakia			X																1
Spain	X			X										X	X	X			5
Sweden							X		X					X	X	X	X		6
Switzerland				X				X	X	X									4
Turkey	X	X	X	X	X	X	X	X	X	X	X	X	X	X	X	X	X	X	18
Ukraine	X	X	X		X	X	X	X	X	X	X	X	X	X	X	X	X	X	17
36 NOCs	14	14	14	15	15	16	16	16	16	16	15	15	13	16	16	15	14	16	272

== Medal summary ==
=== Medal table ===
* Host nation (Belarus)

Rank	Nation	Gold	Silver	Bronze	Total
1	Russia	7	2	5	14
2	Azerbaijan	3	3	4	10
3	Ukraine	2	2	4	8
4	Belarus*	2	2	2	6
5	Georgia	1	3	3	7
6	Armenia	1	1	0	2
7	Sweden	1	0	1	2
8	Latvia	1	0	0	1
9	Bulgaria	0	1	2	3
9	Germany	0	1	2	3
9	Hungary	0	1	2	3
9	Turkey	0	1	2	3
13	Serbia	0	1	1	2
14	Moldova	0	0	2	2
14	Norway	0	0	2	2
16	Estonia	0	0	1	1
16	Poland	0	0	1	1
16	Romania	0	0	1	1
16	San Marino	0	0	1	1
Totals (19 entries)		18	18	36	72

=== Men's freestyle ===
Event	Gold	Silver	Bronze
57 kg	Mahir Amiraslanov (AZE)	Stevan Mićić (SRB)	Zaur Uguev (RUS)
57 kg	Mahir Amiraslanov (AZE)	Stevan Mićić (SRB)	Süleyman Atlı (TUR)
65 kg	Haji Aliyev (AZE)	Vladimer Khinchegashvili (GEO)	Akhmed Chakaev (RUS)
65 kg	Haji Aliyev (AZE)	Vladimer Khinchegashvili (GEO)	Hor Ohannesian (UKR)
74 kg	Zaurbek Sidakov (RUS)	Soner Demirtaş (TUR)	Avtandil Kentchadze (GEO)
74 kg	Zaurbek Sidakov (RUS)	Soner Demirtaş (TUR)	Khadzhimurad Gadzhiyev (AZE)
86 kg	Dauren Kurugliev (RUS)	Ali Shabanau (BLR)	Ahmed Dudarov (GER)
86 kg	Dauren Kurugliev (RUS)	Ali Shabanau (BLR)	Myles Amine (SMR)
97 kg	Abdulrashid Sadulaev (RUS)	Nurmagomed Gadzhiev (AZE)	Aliaksandr Hushtyn (BLR)
97 kg	Abdulrashid Sadulaev (RUS)	Nurmagomed Gadzhiev (AZE)	Elizbar Odikadze (GEO)
125 kg	Anzor Khizriev (RUS)	Givi Matcharashvili (GEO)	Jamaladdin Magomedov (AZE)
125 kg	Anzor Khizriev (RUS)	Givi Matcharashvili (GEO)	Oleksandr Khotsianivskyi (UKR)

=== Men's Greco-Roman ===
Event	Gold	Silver	Bronze
60 kg	Stepan Maryanyan (RUS)	Erik Torba (HUN)	Victor Ciobanu (MDA)
60 kg	Stepan Maryanyan (RUS)	Erik Torba (HUN)	Dato Chkhartishvili (GEO)
67 kg	Zaur Kabaloev (RUS)	Shmagi Bolkvadze (GEO)	Soslan Daurov (BLR)
67 kg	Zaur Kabaloev (RUS)	Shmagi Bolkvadze (GEO)	Mate Nemeš (SRB)
77 kg	Aleksandr Chekhirkin (RUS)	Karapet Chalyan (ARM)	Alex Bjurberg Kessidis (SWE)
77 kg	Aleksandr Chekhirkin (RUS)	Karapet Chalyan (ARM)	Tamás Lőrincz (HUN)
87 kg	Zhan Beleniuk (UKR)	Islam Abbasov (AZE)	Viktor Lőrincz (HUN)
87 kg	Zhan Beleniuk (UKR)	Islam Abbasov (AZE)	Arkadiusz Kułynycz (POL)
97 kg	Artur Aleksanyan (ARM)	Aliaksandr Hrabovik (BLR)	Felix Baldauf (NOR)
97 kg	Artur Aleksanyan (ARM)	Aliaksandr Hrabovik (BLR)	Aleksandr Golovin (RUS)
130 kg^{[a]}	Iakob Kajaia (GEO)	Sergey Semenov (RUS)	Sabah Shariati (AZE)
130 kg^{[a]}	Iakob Kajaia (GEO)	Sergey Semenov (RUS)	Mykola Kuchmii (UKR)

^{a} Kiryl Hryshchanka from Belarus originally won the gold medal, but was later disqualified for doping violations.

=== Women's freestyle ===
Event	Gold	Silver	Bronze
50 kg	Mariya Stadnik (AZE)	Oksana Livach (UKR)	Evin Demirhan (TUR)
50 kg	Mariya Stadnik (AZE)	Oksana Livach (UKR)	Miglena Selishka (BUL)
53 kg	Sofia Mattsson (SWE)	Yuliya Khalvadzhy (UKR)	Nina Hemmer (GER)
53 kg	Sofia Mattsson (SWE)	Yuliya Khalvadzhy (UKR)	Stalvira Orshush (RUS)
57 kg	Iryna Kurachkina (BLR)	Mimi Hristova (BUL)	Alyona Kolesnik (AZE)
57 kg	Iryna Kurachkina (BLR)	Mimi Hristova (BUL)	Anastasia Nichita (MDA)
62 kg	Yuliya Tkach (UKR)	Elmira Gambarova (AZE)	Maria Kuznetsova (RUS)
62 kg	Yuliya Tkach (UKR)	Elmira Gambarova (AZE)	Kriszta Incze (ROU)
68 kg	Anastasija Grigorjeva (LAT)	Anastasia Bratchikova (RUS)	Sofia Georgieva (BUL)
68 kg	Anastasija Grigorjeva (LAT)	Anastasia Bratchikova (RUS)	Alla Cherkasova (UKR)
76 kg	Vasilisa Marzaliuk (BLR)	Francy Rädelt (GER)	Iselin Moen Solheim (NOR)
76 kg	Vasilisa Marzaliuk (BLR)	Francy Rädelt (GER)	Epp Mäe (EST)
