= Wrestling at the 2019 European Games – Men's Greco-Roman 87 kg =

Men's Greco-Roman 87 kg at the 2019 European Games
- Venue: Minsk Sports Palace
- Date: 29 June and 30 June
- Competitors: 16 from 16 nations

Medalists
gold medal	Zhan Beleniuk	Ukraine
silver medal	Islam Abbasov	Azerbaijan
bronze medal	Viktor Lőrincz	Hungary
bronze medal	Arkadiusz Kułynycz	Poland

The Men's Greco-Roman 87 kilograms competition at the 2019 European Games in Minsk was held on 29 and 30 June 2019 at the Minsk Sports Palace.

== Schedule ==
All times are in FET (UTC+03:00)

Date	Time	Event
Saturday, 29 June 2019	11:20	1/8 finals
Saturday, 29 June 2019	12:40	Quarterfinals
Saturday, 29 June 2019	18:00	Semifinals
Sunday, 30 June 2019	13:00	Repechage
Sunday, 30 June 2019	13:30	Finals

== Results ==
Legend

- F — Won by fall

=== Main bracket ===
1/8 finals
Bekkhan Ozdoev (RUS)	5
Metehan Başar (TUR)	0
Ivan Huklek (CRO)	9
Vlad Mariea (ROU)	0
Nikolaj Dobrev (SRB)	0
Islam Abbasov (AZE)	8
Ramon Betschart (SUI)	2
Viktor Lőrincz (HUN)	5
Eividas Stankevičius (LTU)	0
Radzik Kuliyeu (BLR)	9
Robert Kobliashvili (GEO)	10
Dimitrios Tsekeridis (GRE)	0
Viorel Burduja (MDA)	5
Arkadiusz Kułynycz (POL)	3^{F}
Maksim Manukyan (ARM)	1
Zhan Beleniuk (UKR)	5

Quarterfinals
Bekkhan Ozdoev (RUS)	8
Ivan Huklek (CRO)	9
Islam Abbasov (AZE)	3
Viktor Lőrincz (HUN)	0
Radzik Kuliyeu (BLR)	2
Robert Kobliashvili (GEO)	1
Arkadiusz Kułynycz (POL)	1
Zhan Beleniuk (UKR)	9

Semifinals
Ivan Huklek (CRO)	0
Islam Abbasov (AZE)	5
Radzik Kuliyeu (BLR)	1
Zhan Beleniuk (UKR)	3

Final
Islam Abbasov (AZE)	1
Zhan Beleniuk (UKR)	3

=== Repechage ===
Repechage round 1
Nikolaj Dobrev (SRB)	3
Viktor Lőrincz (HUN)	6
Maksim Manukyan (ARM)	3
Arkadiusz Kułynycz (POL)	3

Bronze medals
Viktor Lőrincz (HUN)	7
Ivan Huklek (CRO)	1
Arkadiusz Kułynycz (POL)	7
Radzik Kuliyeu (BLR)	1
