= Wrestling at the 2019 European Games – Men's freestyle 125 kg =

Men's freestyle 125 kg at the 2019 European Games
- Venue: Minsk Sports Palace
- Date: 25 June and 26 June
- Competitors: 16 from 16 nations

Medalists
gold medal	Anzor Khizriev	Russia
silver medal	Givi Matcharashvili	Georgia
bronze medal	Jamaladdin Magomedov	Azerbaijan
bronze medal	Oleksandr Khotsianivskyi	Ukraine

The men's freestyle 125 kilograms wrestling competition at the 2019 European Games in Minsk was held on 25 to 26 June 2019 at the Minsk Sports Palace.

== Schedule ==
All times are in FET (UTC+03:00)

Date	Time	Event
Tuesday, 25 June 2019	12:20	1/8 finals
Tuesday, 25 June 2019	13:20	Quarterfinals
Tuesday, 25 June 2019	19:00	Semifinals
Wednesday, 26 June 2019	11:20	Repechage
Wednesday, 26 June 2019	20:00	Finals

== Results ==
Legend

- F — Won by fall

=== Main bracket ===
1/8 finals
Givi Matcharashvili (GEO)	10
Jere Heino (FIN)	0
Shamhan Jabrailov (MDA)	0
Rareș Chintoan (ROU)	5
Nick Matuhin (GER)	0
Dániel Ligeti (HUN)	3
Jamaladdin Magomedov (AZE)	6
Vitali Piasniak (BLR)	0
Dmitrijs Mihailovs (LAT)	0
Fatih Yaşarlı (TUR)	5
Anzor Khizriev (RUS)	11
Ioannis Kargiotakis (GRE)	0
Johannes Ludescher (AUT)	4
Andranik Galstyan (ARM)	6
Oleksandr Khotsianivskyi (UKR)	6
Robert Baran (POL)	0

Quarterfinals
Givi Matcharashvili (GEO)	14
Rareș Chintoan (ROU)	3
Dániel Ligeti (HUN)	5
Jamaladdin Magomedov (AZE)	6
Fatih Yaşarlı (TUR)	4
Anzor Khizriev (RUS)	9
Andranik Galstyan (ARM)	0
Oleksandr Khotsianivskyi (UKR)	10

Semifinals
Givi Matcharashvili (GEO)	4
Jamaladdin Magomedov (AZE)	2
Anzor Khizriev (RUS)	7
Oleksandr Khotsianivskyi (UKR)	1

Final
Givi Matcharashvili (GEO)	2
Anzor Khizriev (RUS)	10

=== Repechage ===
Repechage round 1
Jere Heino (FIN)	1
Rareș Chintoan (ROU)	5
Ioannis Kargiotakis (GRE)	0
Fatih Yaşarlı (TUR)	4

Bronze medals
Rareș Chintoan (ROU)	2
Jamaladdin Magomedov (AZE)	12
Fatih Yaşarlı (TUR)	1
Oleksandr Khotsianivskyi (UKR)	2
