= Wrestling at the 2019 European Games – Men's freestyle 57 kg =

Men's freestyle 57 kg at the 2019 European Games
- Venue: Minsk Sports Palace
- Date: 25 June and 26 June
- Competitors: 14 from 14 nations

Medalists
gold medal	Mahir Amiraslanov	Azerbaijan
silver medal	Stevan Mićić	Serbia
bronze medal	Süleyman Atlı	Turkey
bronze medal	Zaur Uguev	Russia

The men's freestyle 57 kilograms wrestling competition at the 2019 European Games in Minsk was held on 25 to 26 June 2019 at the Minsk Sports Palace.

== Schedule ==
All times are in FET (UTC+03:00)

Date	Time	Event
Tuesday, 25 June 2019	11:00	1/8 finals
Tuesday, 25 June 2019	12:40	Quarterfinals
Tuesday, 25 June 2019	18:00	Semifinals
Wednesday, 26 June 2019	11:00	Repechage
Wednesday, 26 June 2019	18:40	Finals

== Results ==
Legend

- F — Won by fall

=== Main bracket ===
1/8 finals
Stevan Mićić (SRB)	4
Lasha Lomtadze (GEO)	2
Levan Metreveli (ESP)	0
Süleyman Atlı (TUR)	10
Georgi Vangelov (BUL)	5
Mahir Amiraslanov (AZE)	6
Vladimir Egorov (MKD)	3
Givi Davidovi (ITA)	2
Andrei Dukov (ROU)	1
Garik Barseghyan (ARM)	3
Alexandru Chirtoacă (MDA)	0
Zaur Uguev (RUS)	11

Quarterfinals
Taras Markovych (UKR)	7
Uladzislau Andreyeu (BLR)	3
Stevan Mićić (SRB)	6
Süleyman Atlı (TUR)	5
Mahir Amiraslanov (AZE)	4
Vladimir Egorov (MKD)	0
Garik Barseghyan (ARM)	0
Zaur Uguev (RUS)	10

Semifinals
Taras Markovych (UKR)	4
Stevan Mićić (SRB)	7
Mahir Amiraslanov (AZE)	3
Zaur Uguev (RUS)	2

Final
Stevan Mićić (SRB)	1
Mahir Amiraslanov (AZE)	9

=== Repechage ===
Repechage round 1
Lasha Lomtadze (GEO)	0
Süleyman Atlı (TUR)	6
Georgi Vangelov (BUL)	3
Vladimir Egorov (MKD)	3

Bronze medals
Süleyman Atlı (TUR)	12
Taras Markovych (UKR)	9
Georgi Vangelov (BUL)	2
Zaur Uguev (RUS)	10
