= Azerbaijan at the 2019 European Games =

- IOC code: AZE
- NOC: National Olympic Committee of the Republic of Azerbaijan
- Website: www.olympic.az

in Minsk, Belarus 21 June 2019 – 30 June 2019
- Competitors: 82 in 11 sports
- Flag bearers: Rustam Orujov – Opening Ceremony; Asiman Gurbanli – Closing Ceremony
- Medals Ranked 10th: Gold 5 Silver 10 Bronze 13 Total 28

European Games appearances (overview)
- 2015; 2019; 2023; 2027

Azerbaijan participated in the 2019 European Games held in Minsk from 21 to 30 June 2019. Azerbaijan were represented in 11 sports by a total of 82 competitors across the games.

== Medalists ==
Medal	Name	Sport	Event	Date
Gold	Mahir Amiraslanov	Wrestling	Men's −57 kg	26 June
Gold	Haji Aliyev	Wrestling	Men's −65 kg	27 June
Gold	Mariya Stadnik	Wrestling	Women's −50 kg	28 June
Gold	Loren Alfonso	Boxing	Men's −81 kg	29 June
Gold	Asiman Gurbanli	Karate	Men's kumite +84 kg	29 June
Silver	Ruhidil Gurbanli; Abdulla Al-Mashaykhi	Gymnastics	Mixed pairs – Dynamic	22 June
Silver	Ruhidil Gurbanli; Abdulla Al-Mashaykhi	Gymnastics	Mixed pairs – All-Around	23 June
Silver	Rustam Orujov	Judo	Men's −73 kg	23 June
Silver	Aghasif Samadov	Sambo	Men's −52 kg	23 June
Silver	Nurmagomed Gadzhiyev	Wrestling	Men's −97 kg	27 June
Silver	Elmira Gambarova	Wrestling	Women's −62 kg	28 June
Silver	Irina Zaretska	Karate	Women's kumite −68 kg	29 June
Silver	Islam Abbasov	Wrestling	Men's Greco-Roman −87 kg	30 June
Silver	Firdovsi Farzaliyev	Karate	Men's kumite −60 kg	30 June
Silver	Rafael Aghayev	Karate	Men's kumite −75 kg	30 June
Bronze	Ruhidil Gurbanli; Abdulla Al-Mashaykhi	Gymnastics	Mixed pairs – Balance	22 June
Bronze	Mehman Khalilov	Sambo	Men's −57 kg	22 June
Bronze	Emil Hasanov	Sambo	Men's −68 kg	22 June
Bronze	Hidayat Heydarov	Judo	Men's −73 kg	23 June
Bronze	Mammadali Mehdiyev	Judo	Men's −90 kg	24 June
Bronze	Elmar Gasimov	Judo	Men's −100 kg	24 June
Bronze	Iryna Kindzerska	Judo	Women's +78 kg	24 June
Bronze	Khadzhimurad Gadzhiyev	Wrestling	Men's −74 kg	26 June
Bronze	Jamaladdin Magomedov	Wrestling	Men's −125 kg	26 June
Bronze	Lorenzo Sotomayor	Boxing	Men's −69 kg	28 June
Bronze	Alyona Kolesnik	Wrestling	Women's −57 kg	28 June
Bronze	Roman Heydarov	Karate	Individual kata	29 June
Bronze	Sabah Shariati	Wrestling	Men's Greco-Roman −130 kg	30 June

Medals by sport
Sport	1st place, gold medalist(s)	2nd place, silver medalist(s)	3rd place, bronze medalist(s)	Total
Gymnastics	0	2	1	3
Sambo	0	1	2	3
Judo	0	1	4	5
Wrestling	3	3	4	10
Boxing	1	0	1	2
Karate	1	3	1	5
Total	5	10	13	28

Medals by date
Day	Date	1st place, gold medalist(s)	2nd place, silver medalist(s)	3rd place, bronze medalist(s)	Total
Day 1	21 June	0	0	0	0
Day 2	22 June	0	1	3	4
Day 3	23 June	0	3	1	4
Day 4	24 June	0	0	3	3
Day 5	25 June	0	0	0	0
Day 6	26 June	1	0	2	3
Day 7	27 June	1	1	0	2
Day 8	28 June	1	1	2	4
Day 9	29 June	2	1	1	4
Day 10	30 June	0	3	1	4
Total		5	10	13	28

== Competitors ==
Azerbaijan will be represented by 82 athletes in 11 sports.

Sport	Men	Women	Total
Archery	0	1	1
Badminton	1	0	1
Boxing	10	1	11
Canoe sprint	0	1	1
Cycling	5	0	5
Gymnastics	4	8	12
Judo	9	6	15
Karate	5	2	7
Sambo	6	1	7
Shooting	3	3	6
Wrestling	11	5	16
Total	54	28	82

== Archery ==
Azerbaijan won the only license for this type at the 2018 European Archery Championships in Legnica, Poland.

Athlete	Event	Ranking round		Round of 64	Round of 32	Round of 16	Quarterfinals	Semifinals	Final / BM	
Athlete	Event	Score	Seed	Opposition Score	Opposition Score	Opposition Score	Opposition Score	Opposition Score	Opposition Score	Rank
Ozay Gasımova	Women's individual	586	43	Richter (GER); L 0–6	Did not advance					

== Badminton ==
Men

Athlete	Event	Group stage				Round of 16	Quarterfinal	Semifinal	Final / BM	
Athlete	Event	Opposition Score	Opposition Score	Opposition Score	Rank	Opposition Score	Opposition Score	Opposition Score	Opposition Score	Rank
Azmy Qowimuramadhoni	Men's singles	Filimon (ROU); W 2–1	Mann (LUX); W 2–0	Malkov (RUS); L 0–2	2 Q	Caljouw (NED); L 1–2	Did not advance			

== Boxing ==
Men

Athlete	Event	Round of 32	Round of 16	Quarterfinals	Semifinals	Final	
Athlete	Event	Opposition Result	Opposition Result	Opposition Result	Opposition Result	Opposition Result	Rank
Rufat Huseynov	-49 kg	Bye	Alaverdian (ISR); W 4–0	Serra (ITA); L 0–5	Did not advance		
Masud Yusifzada	-52 kg	Bye	Zamotayev (UKR); L 1–4	Did not advance			
Tayfur Aliyev	-56 kg	Asenov (BUL); W 3–2	Butsenko (UKR); L 1–4	Did not advance			
Javid Chalabiyev	-60 kg	Ivković (BIH); W 5–0	Bucşa (MDA); W 5–0	Eranosyan (GEO); L 2–3	Did not advance		
Bakhtiyar Gazibayov	-64 kg	Lacruz (NED); L 0–5	Did not advance				
Lorenzo Sotomayor	-69 kg	Madoyan (ARM); W 5–0	Fetahovic (BIH); W 4–1	Behrami (KOS); W 5–0	Mccormack (GBR); L ^{RSC R3 2:14}	Did not advance	3rd place, bronze medalist(s)
Kamran Shakhsuvarly	-75 kg	Kharabadze (GEO); W 4–1	Nevin (IRL); L 0–5	Did not advance			
Loren Alfonso Dominguez	-81 kg	Hrekul (UKR); W 3–0	Dauhaliavets (BLR); W 5–0	El Mohor (BEL); W 5–0	Fiori (ITA); W 4–1	Whittaker (GBR); W 3–2	1st place, gold medalist(s)
Rahil Mammadli	-91 kg	Pantaleev (BUL); L 0–5	Did not advance				
Mahammad Abdullayev	+91 kg	Belberov (BUL); L 1–4	Did not advance				

Women

Athlete	Event	Round of 16	Quarterfinals	Semifinals	Final	
Athlete	Event	Opposition Result	Opposition Result	Opposition Result	Opposition Result	Rank
Maryam Jabrayilova	-69 kg	Budai (HUN); L 1–4	Did not advance			

== Canoeing ==
Women

Athlete	Event	Heats		Semifinals		Finals	
Athlete	Event	Time	Rank	Time	Rank	Time	Rank
Maria-Lorena Manolica	K-1 200 m	44.750	6 QS	43.071	8 qB	47.298	6

== Cycling ==
=== Road ===
Athlete	Event	Time	Rank
Samir Jabrayilov	Men's road race	4:10:58	63
Samir Jabrayilov	Men's time trial	37:39.39	31
Elchin Asadov	Men's road race	4:21:27	104
Elchin Asadov	Men's time trial	36:50.80	29
Mikayil Safarli	Men's road race	DNF	
Musa Mikayilzade	Men's road race	DNF	

=== Track ===
Sprint

Athlete	Event	Qualification		Round of 64	Round of 64 Repechages	Round of 32	Round of 32 Repechages	Round of 16	Round of 16 Repechages	Quarterfinals	Semifinals	Final	
Athlete	Event	Time Speed (km/h)	Rank	Opposition Time Speed (km/h)	Opposition Time Speed (km/h)	Opposition Time Speed (km/h)	Opposition Time Speed (km/h)	Opposition Time Speed (km/h)	Opposition Time Speed (km/h)	Opposition Time Speed (km/h)	Opposition Time Speed (km/h)	Opposition Time Speed (km/h)	Rank
Sergey Omelchenko	Men's sprint	10.805	22 Q	11.265 R	10.715	Did not advance							

Keirin

Athlete	Event	1st Round	Repechage	2nd Round	Final
Athlete	Event	Rank	Rank	Rank	Rank
Sergey Omelchenko	Men's keirin	5 R	3	Did not advance	

== Gymnastics ==
=== Acrobatic ===
Mixed pair

Athlete	Event	Final				
Athlete	Event	Discipline			Total	Rank
Athlete	Event	B	D	C	Total	Rank
Ruhidil Gurbanli; Abdulla Al-Mashaykhi	Dynamic	—N/a	28.830	—N/a	28.830	2nd place, silver medalist(s)
Ruhidil Gurbanli; Abdulla Al-Mashaykhi	Balance	28.160	—N/a		28.160	3rd place, bronze medalist(s)
Ruhidil Gurbanli; Abdulla Al-Mashaykhi	All-around	—N/a		29.540	29.540	2nd place, silver medalist(s)

=== Artistic ===
Men

Athlete	Event	Apparatus						Total	Rank
Athlete	Event	F	PH	R	V	PB	HB	Total	Rank
Ivan Tikhonov	Qualification	13.633	13.833	12.933	13.666	12.100	13.200	79.999 Q	13
Ivan Tikhonov	All-around	14.233	13.666	12.766	14.666	12.933	11.966	80.230	14
Ivan Tikhonov	Floor	DNA	—N/a					Did not advance	
Ivan Tikhonov	Pommel horse	—N/a	DNA	—N/a				Did not advance	
Ivan Tikhonov	Rings	—N/a		DNA	—N/a			Did not advance	
Ivan Tikhonov	Vault	—N/a			DNA	—N/a		Did not advance	
Ivan Tikhonov	Parallel bars	—N/a				DNA	—N/a	Did not advance	
Ivan Tikhonov	Horizontal bar	—N/a					DNA	Did not advance	

Women

Athlete	Event	Apparatus				Total	Rank
Athlete	Event	F	BT	UB	V	Total	Rank
Marina Nekrasova	Qualification	DNS	11.966	DNS	14.116 Q	26.166	36
Marina Nekrasova	All-around	Did not advance					
Marina Nekrasova	Floor	DNA	—N/a			Did not advance	
Marina Nekrasova	Balance beam	—N/a	DNA	—N/a		Did not advance	
Marina Nekrasova	Uneven bars	—N/a		DNA	—N/a	Did not advance	
Marina Nekrasova	Vault	—N/a			13.466	13.466	6

=== Rhythmic ===
Individual

Athlete	Event	Final & Qualification					
Athlete	Event	Hoop	Ball	Clubs	Ribbon	Total	Rank
Zohra Aghamirova	All-around	19.100	17.850	19.225	16.225	72.400	8
Zohra Aghamirova	Hoop	Did not advance					
Zohra Aghamirova	Ball	Did not advance					
Zohra Aghamirova	Clubs	Did not advance					
Zohra Aghamirova	Ribbon	Did not advance					

Group

Athlete	Event	Total	Rank
Darya Sorokina; Zeynab Hummatova; Diana Ahmadbayli; Ayshan Bayramova; Aliya Pashayeva	All-round	44.975	6
Darya Sorokina; Zeynab Hummatova; Diana Ahmadbayli; Ayshan Bayramova; Aliya Pashayeva	5 balls	20.700	7
Darya Sorokina; Zeynab Hummatova; Diana Ahmadbayli; Ayshan Bayramova; Aliya Pashayeva	3 hoops, 4 clubs	24.275	6

=== Trampoline ===
Men

Athlete	Event	Qualification				Final	
Athlete	Event	Routine 1	Routine 2	Total	Rank	Score	Rank
Ruslan Aghamirov	Men's individual	48.440	17.045	65.485	20	Did not advance	
Ilya Grishunin	Men's individual	50.500	6.360	56.860	23	Did not advance	
Ruslan Aghamirov; Ilya Grishunin	Men's synchronized	—N/a				47.900	5

== Judo ==
Men

Athlete	Event	Round of 32	Round of 16	Quarterfinals	Semifinals	Repechage	Final / BM	
Athlete	Event	Opposition Result	Opposition Result	Opposition Result	Opposition Result	Opposition Result	Opposition Result	Rank
Karamat Huseynov	-60 kg	Trbovc (SLO); W 1–0	Tsjakadoea (NED); L 0x–10s2	Did not advance				
Orkhan Safarov	-60 kg	Štarkel (SLO); W 10s1–0	Verstraeten (BEL); L 0s1–10s2	Did not advance				
Nijat Shikhalizada	-66 kg	Iadov (UKR); L 0–1s1	Did not advance					
Rustam Orujov	-73 kg	Bessi (MON); W 10–0	Basile (ITA); W 10s1–1s1	Karapetian (ARM); W 1s2–0s2	Azoidis (GRE); W 10s1–0s1	Bye	Macias (SWE); L 1s1–11s1	2nd place, silver medalist(s)
Hidayat Heydarov	-73 kg	Ungvári (HUN); W 1–0s2	Gemer (ISR); W 11–0s2	Azoidis (GRE); L 0s1–10	Did not advance	Karapetian (ARM); W 10s1–0h	Shavdatuashvili (GEO); W 10–0	3rd place, bronze medalist(s)
Mammadali Mehdiyev	-90 kg	Varapayeu (BLR); W 10s1–0h	Diesse (FRA); W 1s1–0	Özerler (TUR); L 0s1–10s1	Did not advance	Grossklaus (SUI); W 10s1–0s2	van 't End (NED); W 10s2–0h	3rd place, bronze medalist(s)
Zelym Kotsoiev	-100 kg	Došen (SRB); W 10s1–0s2	Nikiforov (BEL); L 1s1–10s2	Did not advance				
Elmar Gasimov	-100 kg	Savytskiy (UKR); W 1s1–0	Minaškin (EST); W 11–0	Maret (FRA); L 0–10s1	Did not advance	Pantić (MNE); W 1s1–0s1	Kumrić (CRO); W 10s1–0	3rd place, bronze medalist(s)
Ushangi Kokauri	+100 kg	Bye	Dragič (SLO); W 10–0	Meyer (NED); W 10s1–0h	Tasoev (RUS); L 0s1–11s2	Bye	Hegyi (AUT); L 0s1–10s1	5

Women

Athlete	Event	Round of 32	Round of 16	Quarterfinals	Semifinals	Repechage	Final / BM	
Athlete	Event	Opposition Result	Opposition Result	Opposition Result	Opposition Result	Opposition Result	Opposition Result	Rank
Aisha Gurbanli	-48 kg	Pop (ROU); W 11s1–1s1	Figueroa (ESP); L 0–10	Did not advance				
Alexandra-Larisa Florian	-52 kg	Pienkowska (POL); L 1s1–10s1	Did not advance					
Gultaj Mammadaliyeva	-52 kg	Kakko (FIN); W 1s1–0	Van Snick (BEL); W 10s2–0h	Perenc (POL); L 0s1–10s1	Did not advance	Giuffrida (ITA); L 0–10	Did not advance	
Mönkhtsedeviin Ichinkhorloo	-57 kg	Liparteliani (GEO); L 0s2–1s1	Did not advance					
Nuriyya Akhundova	-63 kg	Dobre (ROU); L 0h–10s1	Did not advance					
Iryna Kindzerska	+78 kg	Bye	Külbs (GER); W 10–0s1	Adlington (GBR); W 11–0	Slutskaya (BLR); L 0s1–1s2	Bye	Tarasova (UKR); W 11–1h	3rd place, bronze medalist(s)

Mixed events

Athlete	Event	Round of 16	Quarterfinals	Semifinals	Repechage	Final / BM	
Athlete	Event	Opposition Result	Opposition Result	Opposition Result	Opposition Result	Opposition Result	Rank
Azerbaijan Judo Mixed Team	Mixed team	France; L 0–4	Did not advance				

== Karate ==
Men

Athlete	Event	Group phase				Semifinal	Final / BM	
Athlete	Event	Opposition Score	Opposition Score	Opposition Score	Rank	Opposition Score	Opposition Score	Rank
Firdovsi Farzaliyev	–60 kg	Bulatau (BLR); W 8–0	Pavlov (MKD); W 3–3 S	Crescenzo (ITA); D 0–0 HW	1 Q	Plakhutin (RUS); W 0–0 HN	Kalniņš (LAT); L 0–4	2nd place, silver medalist(s)
Rafiz Hasanov	–67 kg	Tadissi (HUN); L 1–5	Krautsou (BLR); L 1–5	Pokorny (AUT); L 3–4	4	Did not advance		
Rafael Aghayev	–75 kg	Kellaway (GBR); W 3–2	Eltemur (TUR); W 1–0	Harspataki (HUN); D 0–0 HW	1 Q	Artamonov (EST); W 2–1	Horuna (UKR); L 0–4	2nd place, silver medalist(s)
Asiman Gurbanli	+84 kg	Darnell (NED); W 2–0	Horne (GER); D 0–0	Yamanoglu (TUR); W 1–0	1 Q	Arkania (GEO); W 8–0 H	Kvesic (CRO); W 1–0	1st place, gold medalist(s)

Individual kata

Athlete	Event	Elimination rounds Kata 1 - Gojushiho Sho	Elimination rounds Kata 2 - Gojushiho Dai	Total	Ranking Rounds Kata 1 - Gankaku	Final/BM	
Athlete	Event	Total result	Total result	Result	Total result	Opposition Score	Rank
Roman Heydarov	Individual kata	24.46	24.80	24.63 Q	25.40	Smorguner (GER); W 25.46–24.54	3rd place, bronze medalist(s)

Women

Athlete	Event	Group phase				Semifinal	Final / BM	
Athlete	Event	Opposition Score	Opposition Score	Opposition Score	Rank	Opposition Score	Opposition Score	Rank
Nurana Aliyeva	–50 kg	Özçelik (TUR); L 0–4	Hubrich (GER); L 1–2	Koulinkovitch (BLR); L 1–3	4	Did not advance		
Irina Zaretska	–68 kg	Semeraro (ITA); D 0–0	Agier (FRA); W 7–2	Kopunova (SVK); W 6–0	1 Q	Melnyk (UKR); W 1–0	Semeraro (ITA); L 1–5	2nd place, silver medalist(s)

== Sambo ==
Men

Athlete	Event	Quarterfinal	Semifinal	Repechage	Final / BM	
Athlete	Event	Opposition Score	Opposition Score	Opposition Score	Opposition Score	Rank
Aghasif Samadov	-52 kg	Katkus (LTU); W 5–0 ^{VO}	Krasinski (BLR); W 4–0 ^{VH}	Bye	Kirakosyan (ARM); L 0–4 ^{VO}	2nd place, silver medalist(s)
Mehman Khalilov	-57 kg	Burdz (BLR); L 1–4 ^{VO}	Did not advance	Bye	Manukyan (ARM); W 9–1 ^{VS}	3rd place, bronze medalist(s)
Javidan Garayev	-62 kg	Karakizidis (GRE); L 1–1 ^{VO}	Did not advance	Fomin (EST); W 1–0 ^{VO}	Chirgadze (GEO); L 0–5 ^{VO}	5
Emil Hasanov	-68 kg	Szoke (ROU); W 6–3 ^{VP}	Liluashvili (GEO); L 3–4 ^{VO}	Bye	Ivanov (BUL); W 0–0 ^{VH}	3rd place, bronze medalist(s)
Abdulla Abdullayev	-74 kg	Sumpor (CRO); L 3–4 ^{VO}	Did not advance	Ghazaryan (ARM); L 0–3 ^{VO}	Did not advance	
Jeyhun Huseynov	-82 kg	Berulava (GEO); L 0–5 ^{VH}	Did not advance	Miceli (ITA); L 1–1 ^{ML}	Did not advance	

Women

Athlete	Event	Quarterfinal	Semifinal	Repechage	Final / BM	
Athlete	Event	Opposition Score	Opposition Score	Opposition Score	Opposition Score	Rank
Gozal Zutova	-72 kg	Larose (FRA); L 4–4 ^{ML}	Did not advance	Podelenczki (ROU); L 0–8 ^{VS}	Did not advance	

== Shooting ==
Men

Athlete	Event	Qualification		Final	
Athlete	Event	Points	Rank	Points	Rank
Ruslan Lunev	10m air pistol	574	20	Did not advance	
Ruslan Lunev	25 metre rapid fire pistol	573	13	Did not advance	
Ali Huseynli	Trap	112	20	Did not advance	
Emin Jafarov	Skeet	107	28	Did not advance	

Women

Athlete	Event	Qualification		Final	
Athlete	Event	Points	Rank	Points	Rank
Nigar Nasirova	10m air pistol	570	15	Did not advance	
Nigar Nasirova	25m pistol	551	35	Did not advance	
Rigina Meftakhetdinova	Skeet	104	23	Did not advance	
Nurlana Jafarova	Skeet	110	14	Did not advance	

Mixed team

Athlete	Event	Qualification		Semifinals		Final	
Athlete	Event	Points	Rank	Points	Rank	Opposition Result	Rank
Ruslan Lunev; Nigar Nasirova	10 m air pistol	566	19	Did not advance			
Ruslan Lunev; Nigar Nasirova	25 metre pistol	537	14	Did not advance			
Emin Jafarov; Nurlana Jafarova	Skeet	136	9	Did not advance			

== Wrestling ==
Men's Greco-Roman

Athlete	Event	Round of 16	Quarterfinal	Semifinal	Repechage	Final / BM	
Athlete	Event	Opposition Result	Opposition Result	Opposition Result	Opposition Result	Opposition Result	Rank
Sakit Guliyev	-60 kg	Lizatovic (CRO); L 0–4 ^{VPO}	Did not advance				
Karim Jafarov	-67 kg	Joergensen (NOR); L 1–4 ^{VPO1}	Did not advance				
Islam Abbasov	-87 kg	Dobrev (SRB); W 8–0 ^{VSU}	Lőrincz (HUN); W 3–0 ^{VPO}	Huklek (CRO); W 5–0 ^{VPO}	Bye	Beleniuk (UKR); L 1–3 ^{VPO1}	2nd place, silver medalist(s)
Orkhan Nuriyev	-97 kg	Gastl (AUT); L 2–7 ^{VPO1}	Did not advance				
Sabah Shariati	-130 kg	Milkovic (CRO); W 3–0 ^{VFA}	Kajaia (GEO); L 4–10 ^{VPO1}	Did not advance	Fridrikas (LTU); W 3–1 ^{VPO1}	Marvik (NOR); W 3–2 ^{VPO1}	3rd place, bronze medalist(s)

Men's freestyle

Athlete	Event	Round of 16	Quarterfinal	Semifinal	Repechage	Final / BM	
Athlete	Event	Opposition Result	Opposition Result	Opposition Result	Opposition Result	Opposition Result	Rank
Mahir Amiraslanov	-57 kg	Vangelov (BUL); W 6–5 ^{VPO1}	Egorov (MKD); W 4–0 ^{VPO}	Uguev (RUS); W 3–2 ^{VPO1}	Bye	Mićić (SRB); W 9–1 ^{VPO1}	1st place, gold medalist(s)
Haji Aliyev	-65 kg	Frangulyan (ARM); W 6–0 ^{VPO}	Koliev (BLR); W 7–5 ^{VPO1}	Ohannesian (UKR); W 4–4 ^{VPO1}	Bye	Khinchegashvili (GEO); W 10–2 ^{VPO1}	1st place, gold medalist(s)
Khadzhimurad Gadzhiyev	-74 kg	Demirtaş (TUR); L 3–4 ^{VPO1}	Did not advance		Binenmpaoum (GRE); W 10–3 ^{VPO1}	Mykhailov (UKR); W 9–1 ^{VPO1}	3rd place, bronze medalist(s)
Alexander Gostiyev	-86 kg	Balaur (MDA); W 7–1 ^{VIN}	Aminashvili (GEO); W 6–2 ^{VPO1}	Kurugliev (RUS); L 3–6 ^{VPO1}	Bye	Amine (SMR); L 3–3 ^{VPO1}	5
Nurmagomed Gadzhiyev	-97 kg	Baran (POL); W 8–0 ^{VPO}	Odikadze (GEO); W 7–3 ^{VPO1}	Mchedlidze (UKR); W 7–0 ^{VPO}	Bye	Sadulaev (RUS); L 0–0 ^{VIN}	2nd place, silver medalist(s)
Jamaladdin Magomedov	-125 kg	Piasniak (BLR); W 6–0 ^{VPO}	Ligeti (HUN); W 6–5 ^{VPO1}	Matcharashvili (GEO); L 2–4 ^{VPO1}	Bye	Chintoan (ROU); W 12–2 ^{VSU1}	3rd place, bronze medalist(s)

Women's freestyle

Athlete	Event	Round of 16	Quarterfinal	Semifinal	Repechage	Final / BM	
Athlete	Event	Opposition Result	Opposition Result	Opposition Result	Opposition Result	Opposition Result	Rank
Mariya Stadnik	-50 kg	Bye	Lukasiak (POL); W 10–0 ^{VSU}	Demirhan (TUR); W 6–1 ^{VPO1}	Bye	Livach (UKR); W 7–1 ^{VPO1}	1st place, gold medalist(s)
Alyona Kolesnik	-57 kg	Galambos (HUN); W 10–0 ^{VSU}	Hristova (BUL); L 0–6 ^{VPO}	Did not advance	Indelicato (ITA); W 12–1 ^{VSU1}	Gün (TUR); W 9–4 ^{VPO1}	3rd place, bronze medalist(s)
Elmira Gambarova	-62 kg	Manzke (GER); W 4–0 ^{VPO}	Madrowska (POL); W 9–0 ^{VPO}	Incze (ROU); W 4–1 ^{VPO1}	Bye	Tkach (UKR); L 0–4 ^{VPO}	2nd place, silver medalist(s)
Irina Netreba	-68 kg	Fransson (SWE); L 1–3 ^{VPO1}	Did not advance				
Sabira Aliyeva	-76 kg	Pitsiava (GRE); W 9–0 ^{VPO}	Nelthorpe (GBR); W 8–2 ^{VPO1}	Rädelt (GER); L 1–11 ^{VSU1}	Bye	Solheim (NOR); L 0–2 ^{VFA}	5
