= 2019 European Judo Championships =

Judo Judo at the 2019 European Games
- Venue: Chizhovka-Arena
- Location: Minsk, Belarus
- Dates: 22–25 June 2019
- Competitors: 390 from 49 nations

Champions
- Mixed team: Russia (1st title)

Competition at external databases
- Links: IJF • EJU • JudoInside

The 2019 European Judo Championships were held in Minsk, Belarus from 22 to 25 June 2019 during the 2019 European Games.

== Medal overview ==
=== Men ===
Event	Gold	Silver	Bronze
−60 kg	Lukhumi Chkhvimiani; Georgia	Francisco Garrigós; Spain	Amiran Papinashvili; Georgia
−60 kg	Lukhumi Chkhvimiani; Georgia	Francisco Garrigós; Spain	Jorre Verstraeten; Belgium
−66 kg	Georgii Zantaraia; Ukraine	Matteo Medves; Italy	Bagrati Niniashvili; Georgia
−66 kg	Georgii Zantaraia; Ukraine	Matteo Medves; Italy	Vazha Margvelashvili; Georgia
−73 kg	Tommy Macias; Sweden	Rustam Orujov; Azerbaijan	Hidayat Heydarov; Azerbaijan
−73 kg	Tommy Macias; Sweden	Rustam Orujov; Azerbaijan	Georgios Azoidis; Greece
−81 kg	Matthias Casse; Belgium	Ivaylo Ivanov; Bulgaria	Luka Maisuradze; Georgia
−81 kg	Matthias Casse; Belgium	Ivaylo Ivanov; Bulgaria	Attila Ungvári; Hungary
−90 kg	Mihael Žgank; Turkey	Li Kochman; Israel	Mammadali Mehdiyev; Azerbaijan
−90 kg	Mihael Žgank; Turkey	Li Kochman; Israel	Khusen Khalmurzaev; Russia
−100 kg	Arman Adamian; Russia	Varlam Liparteliani; Georgia	Elmar Gasimov; Azerbaijan
−100 kg	Arman Adamian; Russia	Varlam Liparteliani; Georgia	Cyrille Maret; France
+100 kg	Guram Tushishvili; Georgia	Inal Tasoev; Russia	Stephan Hegyi; Austria
+100 kg	Guram Tushishvili; Georgia	Inal Tasoev; Russia	Henk Grol; Netherlands

=== Women ===
Event	Gold	Silver	Bronze
−48 kg	Daria Bilodid; Ukraine	Irina Dolgova; Russia	Julia Figueroa; Spain
−48 kg	Daria Bilodid; Ukraine	Irina Dolgova; Russia	Maruša Štangar; Slovenia
−52 kg	Majlinda Kelmendi; Kosovo	Natalia Kuziutina; Russia	Chelsie Giles; Great Britain
−52 kg	Majlinda Kelmendi; Kosovo	Natalia Kuziutina; Russia	Amandine Buchard; France
−57 kg	Daria Mezhetskaia; Russia	Nora Gjakova; Kosovo	Pauline Starke; Germany
−57 kg	Daria Mezhetskaia; Russia	Nora Gjakova; Kosovo	Telma Monteiro; Portugal
−63 kg	Clarisse Agbegnenou; France	Alice Schlesinger; Great Britain	Sanne Vermeer; Netherlands
−63 kg	Clarisse Agbegnenou; France	Alice Schlesinger; Great Britain	Maria Centracchio; Italy
−70 kg	Margaux Pinot; France	Sanne van Dijke; Netherlands	Barbara Matić; Croatia
−70 kg	Margaux Pinot; France	Sanne van Dijke; Netherlands	Anna Bernholm; Sweden
−78 kg	Klara Apotekar; Slovenia	Guusje Steenhuis; Netherlands	Loriana Kuka; Kosovo
−78 kg	Klara Apotekar; Slovenia	Guusje Steenhuis; Netherlands	Madeleine Malonga; France
+78 kg	Maryna Slutskaya; Belarus	Larisa Cerić; Bosnia and Herzegovina	Iryna Kindzerska; Azerbaijan
+78 kg	Maryna Slutskaya; Belarus	Larisa Cerić; Bosnia and Herzegovina	Ksenia Chibisova; Russia

=== Mixed events ===
Event	Gold	Silver	Bronze
Mixed team	Russia; Aleksandra Babintseva; Ksenia Chibisova; Daria Davydova; Khusen Khalmurzaev; Alan Khubetsov; Anastasiia Konkina; Daria Mezhetskaia; Musa Mogushkov; Alena Prokopenko; Inal Tasoev; Denis Yartsev; Kazbek Zankishiev	Portugal; Anri Egutidze; Jorge Fernandes; Jorge Fonseca; Telma Monteiro; Rochele Nunes; Joana Ramos; Tiago Rodrigues; Patricia Sampaio; Nuno Saraiva; Bárbara Timo	France; Amandine Buchard; Guillaume Chaine; Axel Clerget; Aurelien Diesse; Marie-Ève Gahié; Priscilla Gneto; Kilian Le Blouch; Madeleine Malonga; Cyrille Maret; Anne Fatoumata M'Bairo; Margaux Pinot
Mixed team	Russia; Aleksandra Babintseva; Ksenia Chibisova; Daria Davydova; Khusen Khalmurzaev; Alan Khubetsov; Anastasiia Konkina; Daria Mezhetskaia; Musa Mogushkov; Alena Prokopenko; Inal Tasoev; Denis Yartsev; Kazbek Zankishiev	Portugal; Anri Egutidze; Jorge Fernandes; Jorge Fonseca; Telma Monteiro; Rochele Nunes; Joana Ramos; Tiago Rodrigues; Patricia Sampaio; Nuno Saraiva; Bárbara Timo	Austria; Daniel Allerstorfer; Shamil Borchashvili; Marko Bubanja; Sabrina Filzmoser; Bernadette Graf; Stephan Hegyi; Magdalena Krssakova; Michaela Polleres; Lukas Reiter; Katharina Tanzer

=== Medal table ===
* Host nation (Belarus)

Rank	Nation	Gold	Silver	Bronze	Total
1	Russia	3	3	2	8
2	Georgia	2	1	4	7
3	France	2	0	4	6
4	Ukraine	2	0	0	2
5	Kosovo	1	1	1	3
6	Belgium	1	0	1	2
6	Slovenia	1	0	1	2
6	Sweden	1	0	1	2
9	Belarus*	1	0	0	1
9	Turkey	1	0	0	1
11	Netherlands	0	2	2	4
12	Azerbaijan	0	1	4	5
13	Great Britain	0	1	1	2
13	Italy	0	1	1	2
13	Portugal	0	1	1	2
13	Spain	0	1	1	2
17	Bosnia and Herzegovina	0	1	0	1
17	Bulgaria	0	1	0	1
17	Israel	0	1	0	1
20	Austria	0	0	2	2
21	Croatia	0	0	1	1
21	Germany	0	0	1	1
21	Greece	0	0	1	1
21	Hungary	0	0	1	1
Totals (24 entries)		15	15	30	60

== Participating nations ==
- Albania (1)
- Andorra (1)
- Armenia (1)
- Austria (12)
- Azerbaijan (15)
- Belarus (15)
- Belgium (12)
- Bosnia and Herzegovina (4)
- Bulgaria (5)
- Croatia (5)
- Cyprus (2)
- Czech Republic (7)
- Denmark (3)
- Estonia (5)
- Finland (3)
- France (17)
- Georgia (10)
- Germany (18)
- Great Britain (12)
- Greece (4)
- Hungary (17)
- Iceland (1)
- Ireland (2)
- Israel (10)
- Italy (17)
- Kosovo (4)
- Latvia (2)
- Liechtenstein (1)
- Lithuania (5)
- Luxembourg (1)
- Malta (1)
- Moldova (5)
- Monaco (2)
- Montenegro (4)
- Netherlands (16)
- North Macedonia (1)
- Norway (1)
- Poland (16)
- Portugal (18)
- Romania (13)
- Russia (18)
- Serbia (11)
- Slovakia (5)
- Slovenia (14)
- Spain (18)
- Sweden (5)
- Switzerland (3)
- Turkey (13)
- Ukraine (14)
