= Armenia at the 2019 European Games =

- IOC code: ARM
- NOC: Armenian Olympic Committee
- Website: www.armnoc.am

in Minsk, Belarus 21 June 2019 – 30 June 2019
- Competitors: 37 in 8 sports
- Medals Ranked 11th: Gold 5 Silver 3 Bronze 3 Total 11

European Games appearances (overview)
- 2015; 2019; 2023; 2027

Armenia participated in the 2019 European Games held in Minsk from 21 to 30 June 2019. The number of Armenian athletes participating in the 2019 European Games was 37 and the types of sports they represent are nine.

== Medalists ==
Medal	Name	Sport	Event	Date
Gold	Tigran Kirakosyan	Sambo	Men's 52 kg	23 June
Gold	Artur Hovhannisyan	Boxing	Men's 49 kg	30 June
Gold	Hovhannes Bachkov	Boxing	Men's 64 kg	30 June
Gold	Artur Aleksanyan	Greco-Roman Wrestling	Men's 97 kg	30 June
Gold	Artur Davtyan	Gymnastics	Men's vault	30 June
Silver	Davit Grigoryan	Sambo	Men's 82 kg	22 June
Silver	Karapet Chalyan	Greco-Roman Wrestling	Men's 77 kg	29 June
Silver	Vahagn Davtyan	Gymnastics	Men's rings	30 June
Bronze	Arsen Ghazaryan	Sambo	Men's 74 kg	23 June
Bronze	Gor Nersesyan	Boxing	Men's 81 kg	28 June
Bronze	Karen Tonakanyan	Boxing	Men's 60 kg	28 June

== Badminton ==
Athletes	Event	Group stage				Round of 16	Quarterfinals	Semifinals	Finals	Rank
Athletes	Event	Opposition Score	Opposition Score	Opposition Score	Rank	Opposition Score	Opposition Score	Opposition Score	Opposition Score	Rank
Lilit Poghosyan	Women's singles	Polikarpova (ISR); L 0–2	Ginga (MDA); W 2–0	Kjærsfeldt (DEN); L 0–2	3	Did not advance				17

== Boxing ==
Men

Athlete	Event	Round of 32	Round of 16	Quarterfinals	Semifinals	Final	
Athlete	Event	Opposition Result	Opposition Result	Opposition Result	Opposition Result	Opposition Result	Rank
Artur Hovhannisyan	49 kg	BYE	Karmilchyk (BLR); W 5–0	Gîrleanu (ROU); W 4–1	Daly (IRL); W 3–2	Alakhverdovi (GEO); W 4–1	1st place, gold medalist(s)
Baregham Harutyunyan	52 kg	BYE	Aliyeu (BLR); W 4–1	Escobar (ESP); L0–5	Did not advance		
Zhirayr Sargsyan	56 kg	Jitaru (ROU); W 4–1	Walker (IRL); L1–4	Did not advance			
Karen Tonakanyan	60 kg	BYE	Eusse (ESP); W 5–0	French (GBR); W 3–2	Asanau (BLR); L1–4	Did not advance	3rd place, bronze medalist(s)
Hovhannes Bachkov	64 kg	BYE	McGivern (IRL); W 5–0	Tsanikidis (GRE); W 5–0	Lacruz (NED); W 4–1	Oumiha (FRA); W 3–2	1st place, gold medalist(s)
Gurgen Madoyan	69 kg	Sotomayor (AZE); L 0–5	Did not advance				
Arman Darchinyan	75 kg	Sobjeslavski (CRO); W 5–0	Khyzhniak (UKR); L 0–5	Did not advance			
Gor Nersesyan	81 kg	Delijaj (KOS); W RSC	Chiriacov (MDA); W 5–0	Malkan (TUR); W 3–2	Whittaker (GBR); L 0–5	Did not advance	3rd place, bronze medalist(s)
Henrik Sargsyan	91 kg	Müllenberg (NED); L 1–4	Did not advance				
Gurgen Hovhannisyan	+91 kg	Veletić (BIH); W 3–2	İlyas (TUR); W 3–2	Tiafack (GER); L 2–3	Did not advance		

Women

Athlete	Event	Round of 32	Round of 16	Quarterfinals	Semifinals	Final	
Athlete	Event	Opposition Result	Opposition Result	Opposition Result	Opposition Result	Opposition Result	Rank
Anush Grigoryan	51 kg	—N/a	Freiherrová (CZE); W 5–0	Drabik (POL); L 0–5	Did not advance		

== Canoe sprint ==
Men

Athlete	Event	Heats		Semifinal		Final	
Athlete	Event	Time	Rank	Time	Rank	Time	Rank
Ara Virabyanl; Davit Marabyan	C-2 1000 m	DSQ		Did not advance			
Vladimir Alaverdyan	K-1 5000 m	—N/a				25:36.645	21

== Cycling ==
=== Track ===
Athlete	Event	Points	Rank
Edgar Stepanyan	Men's points race	DNF	

== Gymnastics ==
=== Artistic ===
Men

Athlete	Event	Apparatus						Total	Rank
Athlete	Event	F	PH	R	V	PB	HB	Total	Rank
Artur Davtyan	Qualification	14.200Q	14.133	13.666	14.600Q	13.766	12.866	82.231	2 Q
Artur Davtyan	All-around	13.800	14.400	13.966	14.100	14.000	13.366	83.632	5
Artur Davtyan	Floor	13.466	—N/a					13.466	6
Artur Davtyan	Vault	—N/a			15.016	—N/a		15.016	1st place, gold medalist(s)
Vahagn Davtyan	Qualification	–	–	14.500 Q	–	–	–	—N/a	
Vahagn Davtyan	Rings	—N/a		14.766	—N/a			14.766	2nd place, silver medalist(s)
Artur Tovmasyan	Qualification	–	–	14.400	–	–	–	—N/a	

== Judo ==
Men

Athlete	Event	Round of 64	Round of 32	Round of 16	Quarterfinals	Semifinals	Repechage	Final / BM	
Athlete	Event	Opposition Result	Opposition Result	Opposition Result	Opposition Result	Opposition Result	Opposition Result	Opposition Result	Rank
Ferdinand Karapetian	−73 kg	Bye	Fernandes (POR); W 10–00	Mogushkov (RUS); W 10–00	Orujov (AZE); L 00–10	Did not advance	Heydarov (AZE); L 00–10	did not advance	

== Sambo ==
Key:

- ML – Minimal advantage by last technical evaluation
- MT – Minimal advantage by technical points
- VH – Total victory – painful hold
- VO – Victory by technical points – the loser without technical points
- VP – Victory by technical points – the loser with technical points
- VS – Total victory by decisive superiority
- VT – Total victory – total throw

Men

Athlete	Event	Quarterfinals	Semifinals	Repechage	Final / BM	
Athlete	Event	Opposition Result	Opposition Result	Opposition Result	Opposition Result	Rank
Tigran Kirakosyan	−52 kg	Bratchenko (UKR); W 3−3	Kubarkov (RUS); W 4−0	—N/a	Samadov (AZE); W 4−0	1st place, gold medalist(s)
Maksim Manukyan	−57 kg	Pylypiak (UKR); W 10−1^{VS}	Khertek (RUS); L 0−4^{VH}	—N/a	Khalilov (AZE); L 1−9^{VS}	5
Arsen Ghazaryan	−74 kg	Skryabin (RUS); L 1−2	Did not advance	Abdullayev (AZE); W 3−0	Markarian (GRE); W 10−0^{VS}	3rd place, bronze medalist(s)
Davit Grigoryan	−82 kg	Miceli (ITA); W 3−1	Berulava (GEO); W 1−0	—N/a	Perepelyuk (RUS); L 1−7^{VH}	2nd place, silver medalist(s)
Grigor Sahakyan	−90 kg	Vacek (CZE); W 8−0^{VS}	Ryabov (RUS); L 1−3	—N/a	Gviniashvili (GEO); L 3−4	5

Women

Athlete	Event	Quarterfinals	Semifinals	Repechage	Final / BM	
Athlete	Event	Opposition Result	Opposition Result	Opposition Result	Opposition Result	Rank
Asya Lalazaryan	−48 kg	Bye	Novikova (UKR); L 0−0^{VH}	—N/a	Kapayeva (BLR); L 0−1^{VH}	5

== Shooting ==
Men

Athlete	Event	Qualification		Final	
Athlete	Event	Points	Rank	Points	Rank
Hrachik Babayan	10 m air rifle	623.6	24	Did not advance	
Hrachik Babayan	50 m rifle 3 positions	1142	33	Did not advance	

Women

Athlete	Event	Qualification		Final	
Athlete	Event	Points	Rank	Points	Rank
Alla Poghosyan	10 m air rifle	624.3	18	Did not advance	

Mixed

Athlete	Event	Qualification				Final / BM	
Athlete	Event	Stage 1		Stage 2		Final / BM	
Athlete	Event	Points	Rank	Points	Rank	Opposition Result	Rank
Alla Poghosyan; Hrachik Babayan	10 m air rifle	620.0	23	Did not advance			

== Wrestling ==
Key:

- VFA – Victory by fall
- VFO – Victory by forfeit
- VIN – Victory by injury
- VPO – Victory by points – the loser without technical points
- VPO1 – Victory by points – the loser with technical points
- VSU – Victory by technical superiority – the loser without technical points and a margin of victory of at least 8 (Greco-Roman) or 10 (freestyle) points
- VSU1 – Victory by technical superiority – the loser with technical points and a margin of victory of at least 8 (Greco-Roman) or 10 (freestyle) points

Men's freestyle

Athlete	Event	Round of 16	Quarterfinals	Semifinals	Repechage	Final / BM	
Athlete	Event	Opposition Result	Opposition Result	Opposition Result	Opposition Result	Opposition Result	Rank
Garik Barseghyan	−57 kg	Dukov (ROU); W 2−1	Uguev (RUS); L 0−10	did not advance			
Valodya Frangulyan	−65 kg	Aliyev (AZE); L 0−6	did not advance		Koliev (GEO); W 4−1	Ohannesian (UKR); L 2−8	5
Sargis Hovsepyan	−97 kg	Odikadze (GEO); L 2−13	did not advance				
Andranik Galstyan	−125 kg	Ludescher (AUT); W 6−4	Khotsianivskyi (UKR); L 0−10	did not advance			

Men's Greco-Roman

Athlete	Event	Round of 16	Quarterfinals	Semifinals	Repechage	Final / BM	
Athlete	Event	Opposition Result	Opposition Result	Opposition Result	Opposition Result	Opposition Result	Rank
Armen Melikyan	−60 kg	Kamal (TUR); L 0−4	did not advance				
Karen Aslanyan	−67 kg	Kostadinov (BUL); W 4−0^{F}	Jørgensen (NOR); W 6−1	Bolkvadze (GEO); L 0−5	Bye	Nemeš (SRB); L 1−2	5
Karapet Chalyan	−77 kg	Nuraliiev (UKR); W 9−0	Beşleaga (MDA); W 2−1	Lőrincz (AUT); W 4−1	Bye	Chekhirkin (RUS); L 6−7	2nd place, silver medalist(s)
Maksim Manukyan	−87 kg	Beleniuk (UKR); L 1−5	did not advance		Kułynycz (POL); L 3−3^{VPO1}	did not advance	
Artur Aleksanyan	−97 kg	Nadareishvili (GEO); W 2−1	Gastl (GEO); W 3−1	Golovin (RUS); W 3−1	Bye	Hrabovik (BLR); W 5−0	1st place, gold medalist(s)

== See also ==
- Armenia at the Olympics
- List of multi-sport events
- Sport in Armenia
