= Sambo at the 2019 European Games – Men's 52 kg =

Men's 52 kg at the 2019 European Games
- Venue: Minsk Sports Palace
- Date: 23 June
- Competitors: 8 from 8 nations

Medalists
gold medal	Tigran Kirakosyan	Armenia
silver medal	Aghasif Samadov	Azerbaijan
bronze medal	Andrei Kubarkov	Russia
bronze medal	Givi Nadareishvili	Georgia

The men's 52 kg sambo event at the 2019 European Games in Minsk was held on 23 June at the Minsk Sports Palace.

== Results ==
Legend

- VH – Total victory – painful hold
- VS – Total victory by decisive superiority
- VW – Total victory by withdrawal

Quarterfinals
Aghasif Samadov (AZE)	5
Gintaras Katkus (LTU)	0
Gabriel Ştefăniţă Rîmă (ROU)	3
Maksim Krasinski (BLR)	3
Givi Nadareishvili (GEO)	3
Andrei Kubarkov (RUS)	4
Tigran Kirakosyan (ARM)	7^{VW}
Roman Bratchenko (UKR)	0

Semifinals
Aghasif Samadov (AZE)	4^{VH}
Maksim Krasinski (BLR)	0
Andrei Kubarkov (RUS)	3
Tigran Kirakosyan (ARM)	3

Final
Aghasif Samadov (AZE)	0
Tigran Kirakosyan (ARM)	4

Repechage

Repechage
Gintaras Katkus (LTU)	1
Gabriel Ştefăniţă Rîmă (ROU)	3

Third place
Gabriel Ştefăniţă Rîmă (ROU)	0
Andrei Kubarkov (RUS)	5^{VH}

Repechage
Givi Nadareishvili (GEO)	0^{VH}
Roman Bratchenko (UKR)	0

Third place
Givi Nadareishvili (GEO)	10^{VS}
Maksim Krasinski (BLR)	1
