= Sambo at the 2019 European Games – Men's 68 kg =

Men's 68 kg at the 2019 European Games
- Venue: Minsk Sports Palace
- Date: 22 June
- Competitors: 8 from 8 nations

Medalists
gold medal	Aliaksandr Koksha	Belarus
silver medal	Mindia Liluashvili	Georgia
bronze medal	Nikita Kletskov	Russia
bronze medal	Emil Hasanov	Azerbaijan

The men's 68 kg sambo event at the 2019 European Games in Minsk was held on 22 June at the Minsk Sports Palace.

== Results ==
Legend

- VH – Total victory – painful hold
- VS – Total victory by decisive superiority

Quarterfinals
Nikita Kletskov (RUS)	2
Mindia Liluashvili (GEO)	2
Laszlo Zsolt Szoke (ROU)	3
Emil Hasanov (AZE)	6
Martin Ivanov (BUL)	1
Mattia Galbiati (ITA)	0^{VH}
Aliaksandr Koksha (BLR)	2^{VH}
Dalibor Bogdanov (MKD)	0

Semifinals
Mindia Liluashvili (GEO)	4
Emil Hasanov (AZE)	3
Mattia Galbiati (ITA)	0
Aliaksandr Koksha (BLR)	1

Final
Mindia Liluashvili (GEO)	0
Aliaksandr Koksha (BLR)	5

Repechage

Repechage
Nikita Kletskov (RUS)	3
Laszlo Zsolt Szoke (ROU)	1

Third place
Nikita Kletskov (RUS)	5
Mattia Galbiati (ITA)	0

Repechage
Martin Ivanov (BUL)	9^{VS}
Dalibor Bogdanov (MKD)	0

Third place
Martin Ivanov (BUL)	0
Emil Hasanov (AZE)	0^{VH}
