= Wrestling at the 2019 European Games – Men's freestyle 65 kg =

Men's freestyle 65 kg at the 2019 European Games
- Venue: Minsk Sports Palace
- Date: 26 June and 27 June
- Competitors: 14 from 14 nations

Medalists
gold medal	Haji Aliyev	Azerbaijan
silver medal	Vladimer Khinchegashvili	Georgia
bronze medal	Akhmed Chakaev	Russia
bronze medal	Hor Ohannesian	Ukraine

The men's freestyle 65 kilograms wrestling competition at the 2019 European Games in Minsk was held on 26 to 27 June 2019 at the Minsk Sports Palace.

== Schedule ==
All times are in FET (UTC+03:00)

Date	Time	Event
Wednesday, 26 June 2019	11:20	1/8 finals
Wednesday, 26 June 2019	13:20	Quarterfinals
Wednesday, 26 June 2019	19:00	Semifinals
Thursday, 27 June 2019	11:20	Repechage
Thursday, 27 June 2019	20:00	Finals

== Results ==
Legend

- F — Won by fall

=== Main bracket ===
1/8 finals
Fati Vejseli (MKD)	1
Akhmed Chakaev (RUS)	9
Ilman Mukhtarov (FRA)	2
Krzysztof Bieńkowski (POL)	4
Hor Ohannesian (UKR)	11
Selahattin Kılıçsallayan (TUR)	0
Abdellatif Mansour (ITA)	1
Eriglent Prizreni (ALB)	1
Haji Aliyev (AZE)	6
Valodya Frangulyan (ARM)	0
Zoltán Vilhelm (HUN)	0
George Koliev (BLR)	10

Quarterfinals
Vladimer Khinchegashvili (GEO)	4
Andrei Perpelitsa (MDA)	1
Akhmed Chakaev (RUS)	7
Krzysztof Bieńkowski (POL)	0
Hor Ohannesian (UKR)	10
Abdellatif Mansour (ITA)	0
Haji Aliyev (AZE)	7
George Koliev (BLR)	5

Semifinals
Vladimer Khinchegashvili (GEO)	8
Akhmed Chakaev (RUS)	2
Hor Ohannesian (UKR)	4
Haji Aliyev (AZE)	4

Final
Vladimer Khinchegashvili (GEO)	2
Haji Aliyev (AZE)	10

=== Repechage ===
Repechage round 1
Valodya Frangulyan (ARM)	3
George Koliev (BLR)	1

Bronze medals
Andrei Perpelitsa (MDA)	5
Akhmed Chakaev (RUS)	8
Valodya Frangulyan (ARM)	2
Hor Ohannesian (UKR)	8
