= Gymnastics at the 2019 European Games – Men's artistic qualification =

Men's artistic gymnastics qualification at the 2019 European Games was held at Minsk Arena on June 27. The results of the qualification determined the qualifiers to the finals: 18 gymnasts in the all-around final, and 6 gymnasts in each of 6 apparatus finals. Two gymnasts per country could qualify to the all-around final, and one gymnast per country could qualify to the apparatus finals.

== Results ==
=== Individual all-around ===
Rank	Gymnast	Floor (gymnastics)	Pommel horse	Rings (gymnastics)	Vault (gymnastics)	Parallel bars	Horizontal bar	Total	Qual.
1	David Belyavskiy (RUS)	14.266	14.633	14.100	14.100	15.200	14.200	86.499	Q
2	Artur Davtyan (ARM)	14.200	14.133	13.666	14.600	13.766	12.866	83.231	Q
3	Robert Tvorogal (LTU)	14.200	13.266	13.000	13.666	14.566	14.033	82.731	Q
4	Néstor Abad (ESP)	14.200	12.900	13.800	13.933	14.066	13.800	82.699	Q
5	Vladislav Polyashov (RUS)	13.966	13.333	13.233	13.000	15.133	13.766	82.431	Q
6	Marios Georgiou (CYP)	12.800	14.500	13.100	14.000	14.700	13.133	82.233	Q
7	Ferhat Arıcan (TUR)	14.000	12.266	12.966	14.200	15.033	13.233	81.698	Q
8	Oleg Verniaiev (UKR)	12.400	15.133	13.200	13.233	14.733	12.933	81.632	Q
9	Giarnni Regini-Moran (GBR)	14.233	12.400	13.033	14.800	13.733	13.333	81.532	Q
10	Nicolò Mozzato (ITA)	12.533	13.366	12.933	14.166	14.100	13.833	80.931	Q
11	Petro Pakhniuk (UKR)	14.433	13.833	11.466	14.066	13.966	12.733	80.497	Q
12	Marco Pfyl (SUI)	14.033	12.600	12.966	13.566	13.866	13.433	80.464	Q
13	Ivan Tikhonov (AZE)	13.633	13.833	12.933	14.300	12.100	13.200	79.999	Q
14	Nikolaos Iliopoulos (GRE)	13.066	12.900	13.266	14.000	13.100	13.433	79.765	Q
15	Joel Plata (ESP)	14.166	12.733	13.133	13.700	13.533	12.333	79.598	Q
16	Dmitriy Lankin (RUS)	14.366	11.500	14.366	14.933	13.633	10.600	79.398	–
17	Jimmy Verbaeys (BEL)	13.933	12.700	11.533	13.133	13.933	13.600	78.832	Q
18	Moreno Kratter (SUI)	13.500	12.533	12.600	13.466	13.433	13.300	78.832	Q
19	Loris Frasca (FRA)	11.400	13.633	13.066	14.566	12.800	12.933	78.398	Q
20	Adam Steele (IRL)	13.633	13.133	12.366	13.766	12.333	12.866	78.097	R1
21	Nicolau Mir (ESP)	13.900	11.600	13.500	12.900	12.866	13.100	77.866	–
22	Jake Jarman (GBR)	12.766	13.233	12.533	14.366	12.166	12.633	77.697	R2
23	Oskar Kirmes (FIN)	14.366	11.733	13.000	12.766	13.700	11.933	77.498	R3
24	Yordan Aleksandrov (BUL)	13.766	12.066	12.533	11.900	13.500	13.033	76.798	
25	Ádám Babos (HUN)	12.766	13.700	12.500	13.000	12.566	11.300	75.832	
26	Pietro Giachino (NOR)	13.766	12.866	11.433	13.166	10.733	12.700	74.664	
27	Valgard Reinhardsson (ISL)	13.333	11.966	12.633	12.833	10.533	12.066	73.364	
28	Łukasz Borkowski (POL)	12.133	12.466	12.166	12.533	10.433	11.566	71.297	
	Filip Ude (CRO)		10.400	12.266	13.600	13.333	13.200		
	Andrey Likhovitskiy (BLR)		14.500			14.500	14.000		
	Ahmet Önder (TUR)	DNS	14.000	DNS	DNS	14.866	13.933	DNF	
	Carlo Macchini (ITA)		13.866			14.033	14.333		
	Brinn Bevan (GBR)		13.733			14.866	12.800		
	Alexander Shatilov (ISR)	13.100	13.400				13.833		
	Ihor Radivilov (UKR)			14.700	15.000				
	Yahor Sharamkou (BLR)	14.466			14.166				
	Artem Dolgopyat (ISR)	13.866	13.900						
	İbrahim Çolak (TUR)			14.666		12.866			
	Cyril Tommasone (FRA)		15.100						
	Samir Aït Saïd (FRA)			14.833					
	Andrey Medvedev (ISR)				14.633				
	Emil Soravuo (FIN)	14.600							
	Marco Lodadio (ITA)			14.533					
	Vahagn Davtyan (ARM)			14.500					
	Artur Tovmasyan (ARM)			14.400					
	Slavomír Michňák (SVK)		14.400						
	Dávid Vecsernyés (HUN)						13.866		
	Vasili Mikhalitsyn (BLR)		13.533						

=== Floor ===
Rank	Gymnast	D Score	E Score	Pen.	Total	Qual.
1	Emil Soravuo (FIN)	5.600	9.000		14.600	Q
2	Yahor Sharamkou (BLR)	5.900	8.566		14.466	Q
3	Petro Pakhniuk (UKR)	5.700	8.733		14.433	Q
4	Oskar Kirmes (FIN)	5.500	8.866		14.366	–
5	Dmitriy Lankin (RUS)	6.200	8.266	0.100	14.366	Q
6	David Belyavskiy (RUS)	5.800	8.566	0.100	14.266	–
7	Giarnni Regini-Moran (GBR)	6.200	8.033		14.233	Q
8	Artur Davtyan (ARM)	5.200	9.000		14.200	Q
9	Robert Tvorogal (LTU)	5.400	8.800		14.200	R1
10	Néstor Abad (ESP)	5.600	8.600		14.200	R2
11	Joel Plata (ESP)	5.600	8.566		14.166	–
12	Marco Pfyl (SUI)	5.300	8.733		14.033	R3

=== Pommel horse ===
Rank	Gymnast	D Score	E Score	Pen.	Total	Qual.
1	Oleg Verniaiev (UKR)	6.500	8.633		15.133	Q
2	Cyril Tommasone (FRA)	6.300	8.800		15.100	Q
3	David Belyavskiy (RUS)	6.100	8.533		14.633	Q
4	Marios Georgiou (CYP)	5.900	8.600		14.500	Q
4	Andrey Likhovitskiy (BLR)	5.900	8.600		14.500	Q
6	Slavomír Michňák (SVK)	5.900	8.500		14.400	Q
7	Artur Davtyan (ARM)	5.900	8.233		14.133	R1
8	Ahmet Önder (TUR)	5.400	8.600		14.000	R2
9	Artem Dolgopyat (ISR)	5.600	8.300		13.900	R3

=== Rings ===
Rank	Gymnast	D Score	E Score	Pen.	Total	Qual.
1	Samir Aït Saïd (FRA)	6.300	8.533		14.833	Q
2	Igor Radivilov (UKR)	6.000	8.700		14.700	Q
3	İbrahim Çolak (TUR)	6.200	8.466		14.666	Q
4	Marco Lodadio (ITA)	6.300	8.233		14.533	Q
5	Vahagn Davtyan (ARM)	6.100	8.400		14.500	Q
6	Artur Tovmasyan (ARM)	5.800	8.600		14.400	–
7	Dmitriy Lankin (RUS)	6.100	8.266		14.366	Q
8	David Belyavskiy (RUS)	5.600	8.500		14.100	–
9	Néstor Abad (ESP)	5.500	8.300		13.800	R1
10	Artur Davtyan (ARM)	5.300	8.366		13.666	–
11	Nicolau Mir Rosello (ESP)	5.000	8.500		13.500	–
12	Nikolaos Iliopoulos (GRE)	4.700	8.566		13.266	R2
13	Vladislav Polyashov (RUS)	5.000	8.233		13.233	–
14	Oleg Verniaiev (UKR)	4.900	8.300		13.200	–
15	Joel Plata (ESP)	5.000	8.133		13.133	–
16	Marios Georgiou (CYP)	5.000	8.100		13.100	R3

=== Vault ===
Rank	Gymnast	Vault 1				Vault 2				Total	Qual.
Rank	Gymnast	D Score	E Score	Pen.	Score 1	D Score	E Score	Pen.	Score 2	Total	Qual.
1	Igor Radivilov (UKR)	5.600	9.400		15.000	5.600	9.300		14.900	14.950	Q
2	Dmitriy Lankin (RUS)	5.600	9.333		14.933	5.200	9.366		14.566	14.749	Q
3	Andrey Medvedev (ISR)	5.600	9.033		14.633	5.600	9.100		14.700	14.666	Q
4	Giarnni Regini-Moran (GBR)	5.600	9.200		14.800	5.400	9.100		14.500	14.650	Q
5	Artur Davtyan (ARM)	5.600	9.000		14.600	4.800	9.500		14.300	14.450	Q
6	Loris Frasca (FRA)	5.600	9.066	0.100	14.566	5.600	8.700		14.300	14.433	Q
7	Yahor Sharamkou (BLR)	5.200	8.966		14.166	5.600	9.000		14.600	14.383	R1
8	Jake Jarman (GBR)	5.600	8.866	0.100	14.366	5.200	8.800	0.200	13.800	14.083	–
9	Ivan Tikhonov (AZE)	5.600	8.800	0.100	14.300	5.200	7.833		13.033	13.666	R2
10	Valgard Reinhardsson (ISL)	5.200	7.733	0.100	12.833	5.200	7.800		13.000	12.916	R3

=== Parallel bars ===
Rank	Gymnast	D Score	E Score	Pen.	Total	Qual.
1	David Belyavskiy (RUS)	6.600	8.600		15.200	Q
2	Vladislav Polyashov (RUS)	6.500	8.633		15.133	–
3	Ferhat Arıcan (TUR)	6.300	8.733		15.033	Q
4	Brinn Bevan (GBR)	6.200	8.666		14.866	Q
4	Ahmet Önder (TUR)	6.200	8.666		14.866	–
6	Oleg Verniaiev (UKR)	6.300	8.433		14.733	Q
7	Marios Georgiou (CYP)	6.000	8.700		14.700	Q
8	Robert Tvorogal (LTU)	5.600	8.966		14.566	Q
9	Andrey Likhovitskiy (BLR)	5.500	9.000		14.500	R1
10	Nicolò Mozzato (ITA)	5.500	8.600		14.100	R2
11	Néstor Abad (ESP)	5.600	8.466		14.066	R3

=== Horizontal bar ===
Rank	Gymnast	D Score	E Score	Pen.	Total	Qual.
1	Carlo Macchini (ITA)	5.700	8.633		14.333	Q
2	David Belyavskiy (RUS)	5.700	8.500		14.200	Q
3	Robert Tvorogal (LTU)	5.800	8.233		14.033	Q
4	Andrey Likhovitskiy (BLR)	5.700	8.300		14.000	Q
5	Ahmet Önder (TUR)	5.700	8.233		13.933	Q
6	Dávid Vecsernyés (HUN)	5.500	8.366		13.866	Q
7	Alexander Shatilov (ISR)	5.500	8.333		13.833	R1
8	Nicolò Mozzato (ITA)	5.600	8.233		13.833	–
9	Néstor Abad (ESP)	5.900	7.900		13.800	R2
10	Vladislav Polyashov (RUS)	5.400	8.366		13.766	–
11	Jimmy Verbaeys (BEL)	5.100	8.500		13.600	R3
