= Sambo at the 2019 European Games – Men's 82 kg =

Men's 82 kg at the 2019 European Games
- Venue: Minsk Sports Palace
- Date: 22 June
- Competitors: 8 from 8 nations

Medalists
gold medal	Sergey Ryabov	Russia
silver medal	Davit Grigoryan	Armenia
bronze medal	Besarioni Berulava	Georgia
bronze medal	Tsimafei Yemelyanau	Belarus

The men's 82 kg sambo event at the 2019 European Games in Minsk was held on 22 June at the Minsk Sports Palace.

== Results ==
Legend

- VH – Total victory – painful hold
- VT – Total victory – total throw

Quarterfinals
Tsimafei Yemelyanau (BLR)	1
Sergiu Oslobanu (MDA)	0
Andrey Perepelyuk (RUS)	1^{VH}
Vasili Balampanasvili (GRE)	1
Davit Grigoryan (ARM)	3
Alessio Miceli (ITA)	1
Jeyhun Huseynov (AZE)	0
Besarioni Berulava (GEO)	5^{VH}

Semifinals
Tsimafei Yemelyanau (BLR)	0
Andrey Perepelyuk (RUS)	0^{VT}
Davit Grigoryan (ARM)	1
Besarioni Berulava (GEO)	0

Final
Andrey Perepelyuk (RUS)	7^{VH}
Davit Grigoryan (ARM)	0

Repechage

Repechage
Sergiu Oslobanu (MDA)	4
Vasili Balampanasvili (GRE)	1

Third place
Sergiu Oslobanu (MDA)	0
Besarioni Berulava (GEO)	5

Repechage
Alessio Miceli (ITA)	1
Jeyhun Huseynov (AZE)	1

Third place
Alessio Miceli (ITA)	0
Tsimafei Yemelyanau (BLR)	0
