= Sambo at the 2019 European Games – Men's 74 kg =

Men's 74 kg at the 2019 European Games
- Venue: Minsk Sports Palace
- Date: 23 June
- Competitors: 8 from 8 nations

Medalists
gold medal	Levan Nakhutsrishvili	Georgia
silver medal	Stanislav Skryabin	Russia
bronze medal	Arsen Ghazaryan	Armenia
bronze medal	Stsiapan Papou	Belarus

The men's 74 kg sambo event at the 2019 European Games in Minsk was held on 23 June at the Minsk Sports Palace.

== Results ==
Legend

- VH – Total victory – painful hold
- VS – Total victory by decisive superiority

Quarterfinals
Arsen Ghazaryan (ARM)	1
Stanislav Skryabin (RUS)	2
Dino-Dominic Sumpor (CRO)	4
Abdulla Abdullayev (AZE)	3
Stsiapan Papou (BLR)	1
Levan Nakhutsrishvili (GEO)	2
Ashot Martirosyan (BUL)	0
Georgios Markarian (GRE)	10^{VS}

Semifinals
Stanislav Skryabin (RUS)	4^{VH}
Dino-Dominic Sumpor (CRO)	0
Levan Nakhutsrishvili (GEO)	5
Georgios Markarian (GRE)	1

Final
Stanislav Skryabin (RUS)	1
Levan Nakhutsrishvili (GEO)	5

Repechage

Repechage
Arsen Ghazaryan (ARM)	3
Abdulla Abdullayev (AZE)	0

Third place
Arsen Ghazaryan (ARM)	10^{VS}
Georgios Markarian (GRE)	2

Repechage
Stsiapan Papou (BLR)	1
Ashot Martirosyan (BUL)	0

Third place
Stsiapan Papou (BLR)	2^{VH}
Dino-Dominic Sumpor (CRO)	1
