= Sambo at the 2019 European Games – Men's 62 kg =

Men's 62 kg at the 2019 European Games
- Venue: Minsk Sports Palace
- Date: 23 June
- Competitors: 8 from 8 nations

Medalists
| gold medal | Ruslan Bagdasarian | Russia |
| silver medal | Savvas Karakizidis | Greece |
| bronze medal | Ivan Aniskevich | Belarus |
| bronze medal | Genadi Chirgadze | Georgia |

The men's 62 kg sambo event at the 2019 European Games in Minsk was held on 23 June at the Minsk Sports Palace.

== Results ==
Legend

- VH – Total victory – painful hold
- VS – Total victory by decisive superiority

Quarterfinals
Dmytro Yevdoshenko (UKR) | 0
Ruslan Bagdasarian (RUS) | 2^{VH}
Genadi Chirgadze (GEO) | 8^{VS}
Nam Vu (GER) | 0
Javidan Garayev (AZE) | 1
Savvas Karakizidis (GRE) | 1
Vadim Fomin (EST) | 0
Ivan Aniskevich (BLR) | 10^{VS}

Semifinals
Ruslan Bagdasarian (RUS) | 0^{VH}
Genadi Chirgadze (GEO) | 0
Savvas Karakizidis (GRE) | 0^{VH}
Ivan Aniskevich (BLR) | 0

Final
Ruslan Bagdasarian (RUS) | 2
Savvas Karakizidis (GRE) | 0

Repechage

Repechage
Dmytro Yevdoshenko (UKR) | 8^{VS}
Nam Vu (GER) | 0

Third place
Dmytro Yevdoshenko (UKR) | 1
Ivan Aniskevich (BLR) | 2

Repechage
Javidan Garayev (AZE) | 1
Vadim Fomin (EST) | 0

Third place
Javidan Garayev (AZE) | 0
Genadi Chirgadze (GEO) | 5
