= Sambo at the 2019 European Games – Men's 57 kg =

Men's 57 kg at the 2019 European Games
- Venue: Minsk Sports Palace
- Date: 22 June
- Competitors: 7 from 7 nations

Medalists
| gold medal | Vakhtangi Chidrashvili | Georgia |
| silver medal | Sayan Khertek | Russia |
| bronze medal | Uladzislau Burdz | Belarus |
| bronze medal | Mehman Khalilov | Azerbaijan |

The men's 57 kg sambo event at the 2019 European Games in Minsk was held on 22 June at the Minsk Sports Palace.

== Results ==
Legend

- VH – Total victory – painful hold
- VS – Total victory by decisive superiority

Quarterfinals
Sayan Khertek (RUS) | 3
Emre Celik (TUR) | 0
Ivan Pylypiak (UKR) | 1
Maksim Manukyan (ARM) | 10^{VS}
Mehman Khalilov (AZE) | 1
Uladzislau Burdz (BLR) | 4

Semifinals
Sayan Khertek (RUS) | 4^{VH}
Maksim Manukyan (ARM) | 0
Uladzislau Burdz (BLR) | 0
Vakhtangi Chidrashvili (GEO) | 3

Final
Sayan Khertek (RUS) | 1
Vakhtangi Chidrashvili (GEO) | 1

Repechage

Repechage
Emre Celik (TUR) | 11^{VS}
Ivan Pylypiak (UKR) | 1

Third place
Emre Celik (TUR) | 0
Uladzislau Burdz (BLR) | 6

Third place
Mehman Khalilov (AZE) | 9^{VS}
Maksim Manukyan (ARM) | 1
