= Boxing at the 2019 European Games – Men's 49 kg =

Boxing competitions

Men's light flyweight boxing at the 2019 European Games
- Venue: Uruchie Sports Palace
- Date: 23–30 June
- Competitors: 16 from 16 nations

Medalists
gold medal	Arthur Hovhannisyan	Armenia
silver medal	Sakhil Alakhverdovi	Georgia
bronze medal	Regan Buckley	Ireland
bronze medal	Federico Serra	Italy

The men's light flyweight 49 kg boxing event at the 2019 European Games in Minsk was held from 23 to 30 June at the Uruchie Sports Palace.

== Schedule ==
All times are Further European Time (UTC+03:00)

Date	Time	Event
Sunday, 23 June 2019	14:00	Round of 16
Tuesday, 25 June 2019	19:00	Quarterfinals
Friday, 28 June 2019	20:00	Semifinals
Sunday, 30 June 2019	12:45	Final

== Results ==
Round of 16
Salah Ibrahim (GER)	2
Sakhil Alakhverdovi (GEO)	3
Aqeel Ahmed (GBR)	5
Jakub Słomiński (POL)	0
Federico Serra (ITA)	5
Tinko Banabakov (BUL)	0
Rufat Huseynov (AZE)	4
David Alaverdian (ISR)	0
Nazar Kurotchyn (UKR)	0
Martín Molina (ESP)	5
Bator Sagaluev (RUS)	0
Regan Buckley (IRL)	5
Attila Bernáth (HUN)	2
Cosmin Gîrleanu (ROU)	3
Arthur Hovhannisyan (ARM)	5
Yauheni Karmilchyk (BLR)	0

Quarterfinals
Sakhil Alakhverdovi (GEO)	3
Aqeel Ahmed (GBR)	2
Federico Serra (ITA)	5
Rufat Huseynov (AZE)	0
Martín Molina (ESP)	1
Regan Buckley (IRL)	4
Cosmin Gîrleanu (ROU)	1
Arthur Hovhannisyan (ARM)	4

Semifinals
Sakhil Alakhverdovi (GEO)	3
Federico Serra (ITA)	2
Regan Buckley (IRL)	2
Arthur Hovhannisyan (ARM)	3

Final
Sakhil Alakhverdovi (GEO)	1
Arthur Hovhannisyan (ARM)	4
