= Gymnastics at the 2019 European Games – Men's vault =

Men's vault at the 2019 European Games
- Venue: Minsk-Arena
- Date: 30 June
- Competitors: 6 from 6 nations
- Winning score: 15.016

Medalists
gold medal	Artur Davtyan	Armenia
silver medal	Dmitriy Lankin	Russia
bronze medal	Ihor Radivilov	Ukraine

The men's artistic gymnastics vault competition at the 2019 European Games was held at the Minsk-Arena on 30 June 2019.

== Qualification ==
The top six gymnasts with one per country advanced to the final.

Rank	Gymnast	Vault 1				Vault 2				Total	Qual.
Rank	Gymnast	D Score	E Score	Pen.	Score 1	D Score	E Score	Pen.	Score 2	Total	Qual.
1	Ihor Radivilov (UKR)	5.600	9.400		15.000	5.600	9.300		14.900	14.950	Q
2	Dmitriy Lankin (RUS)	5.600	9.333		14.933	5.200	9.366		14.566	14.749	Q
3	Andrey Medvedev (ISR)	5.600	9.033		14.633	5.600	9.100		14.700	14.666	Q
4	Giarnni Regini-Moran (GBR)	5.600	9.200		14.800	5.400	9.100		14.500	14.650	Q
5	Artur Davtyan (ARM)	5.600	9.000		14.600	4.800	9.500		14.300	14.450	Q
6	Loris Frasca (FRA)	5.600	9.066	–0.100	14.566	5.600	8.700		14.300	14.433	Q
7	Yahor Sharamkou (BLR)	5.200	8.966		14.166	5.600	9.000		14.600	14.383	R1
8	Jake Jarman (GBR)	5.600	8.866	–0.100	14.366	5.200	8.800	–0.200	13.800	14.083	
9	Ivan Tikhonov (AZE)	5.600	8.800	–0.100	14.300	5.200	7.833		13.033	13.666	R2
10	Valgard Reinhardsson (ISL)	5.200	7.733	–0.100	12.833	5.200	7.800		13.000	12.916	R3

== Final ==
Rank	Gymnast	Vault 1				Vault 2				Total
Rank	Gymnast	D Score	E Score	Pen.	Score 1	D Score	E Score	Pen.	Score 2	Total
1st place, gold medalist(s)	Artur Davtyan (ARM)	5.600	9.500		15.100	5.600	9.333		14.933	15.016
2nd place, silver medalist(s)	Dmitriy Lankin (RUS)	5.600	9.266		14.866	5.200	9.400		14.600	14.733
3rd place, bronze medalist(s)	Ihor Radivilov (UKR)	5.600	9.133		14.733	5.600	8.966		14.566	14.649
4	Andrey Medvedev (ISR)	5.600	9.166		14.766	5.600	9.000	–0.100	14.500	14.633
5	Loris Frasca (FRA)	5.600	9.200	–0.300	14.500	5.600	8.900	–0.100	14.400	14.450
6	Giarnni Regini-Moran (GBR)	5.600	9.133		14.733	5.400	8.000		13.400	14.066
