= Boxing at the 2019 European Games – Men's 81 kg =

Boxing competitions

Men's light heavyweight boxing at the 2019 European Games
- Venue: Uruchie Sports Palace
- Date: 22–29 June
- Competitors: 31 from 31 nations

Medalists
gold medal	Loren Alfonso	Azerbaijan
silver medal	Benjamin Whittaker	Great Britain
bronze medal	Simone Fiori	Italy
bronze medal	Gor Nersesyan	Armenia

The men's light heavyweight 81 kg boxing event at the 2019 European Games in Minsk was held from 22 to 29 June at the Uruchie Sports Palace.

Damir Plantić from Croatia was disqualified for doping violations.

== Results ==
=== Final ===
Final; 29 June
Loren Alfonso (AZE)	3
Benjamin Whittaker (GBR)	2

=== Top half ===
Round of 32; 22 June
Stepan Hrekul (UKR)	0
Loren Alfonso (AZE)	3
Denis Lazar (SLO)	1
Ziad El Mohor (BEL)	4
Radenko Tomić (BIH)	1
Jan Mužík (CZE)	4
Matúš Strnisko (SVK)	4
Sandro Poletan (SRB)	1
Ukë Smajli (SUI)	3
Giorgi Manjavidze (GEO)	2
Kristiyan Nikolov (BUL)	0
Simone Fiori (ITA)	5
Paul Arădoaie (ROU)	0
Imam Khataev (RUS)	5

Round of 16; 25 June
Mikhail Dauhaliavets (BLR)	0
Loren Alfonso (AZE)	5
Ziad El Mohor (BEL)	5
Jan Mužík (CZE)	0
Matúš Strnisko (SVK)	5
Ukë Smajli (SUI)	0
Simone Fiori (ITA)	3
Imam Khataev (RUS)	0

Quarterfinals; 26 June
Loren Alfonso (AZE)	5
Ziad El Mohor (BEL)	0
Matúš Strnisko (SVK)	0
Simone Fiori (ITA)	5

Semifinals; 28 June
Loren Alfonso (AZE)	4
Simone Fiori (ITA)	1

=== Bottom half ===
Round of 32; 22 June
~~Damir Plantić (CRO)~~	1
Bayram Malkan (TUR)	4
Pál Kovács (HUN)	0
Gaëtan Ntambwe (FRA)	5
Gor Nersesyan (ARM)	RSC
Ardit Delijaj (KOS)
Andrei Chiriacov (MDA)	3
Stiven Aas (EST)	2
Abdulrahman Abu-Lubdeh (GER)	3
Liridon Nuha (SWE)	2
Mikel Cullhaj (ALB)	0
Artjom Kasparian (NED)	5
Alexander Martinsen (NOR)	0
Umar Dzambekov (AUT)	5
Mateusz Goiński (POL)	0
Benjamin Whittaker (GBR)	5

Round of 16; 25 June
Bayram Malkan (TUR)	3
Gaëtan Ntambwe (FRA)	2
Gor Nersesyan (ARM)	5
Andrei Chiriacov (MDA)	0
Abdulrahman Abu-Lubdeh (GER)	3
Artjom Kasparian (NED)	2
Umar Dzambekov (AUT)	0
Benjamin Whittaker (GBR)	5

Quarterfinals; 26 June
Bayram Malkan (TUR)	2
Gor Nersesyan (ARM)	3
Abdulrahman Abu-Lubdeh (GER)	1
Benjamin Whittaker (GBR)	4

Semifinals; 28 June
Gor Nersesyan (ARM)	0
Benjamin Whittaker (GBR)	5
