= Bosnia and Herzegovina at the 2019 European Games =

- IOC code: BIH
- NOC: Olympic Committee of Bosnia and Herzegovina
- Website: www.okbih.ba

in Minsk, Belarus 21–30 June
- Competitors: 16 in 6 sports
- Flag bearer: Larisa Cerić
- Medals Ranked 39th: Gold 0 Silver 1 Bronze 0 Total 1

European Games appearances (overview)
- 2015; 2019; 2023; 2027

Bosnia and Herzegovina competed at the 2019 European Games in Minsk from 21 to 30 June 2019. Bosnia and Herzegovina were represented by 16 athletes in 6 sports.

== Medalists ==
Medal	Name	Sport	Event	Date
Silver	Larisa Cerić	Judo	Women's +78kg	24 June

== Competitors ==
Sport	Men	Women	Total
Boxing	7	0	7
Canoe sprint	1	0	1
Cycling	2	0	2
Judo	2	2	4
Shooting	1	0	1
Table tennis	0	1	1
Total	13	3	16

== Boxing ==
Athlete	Event	Round of 64	Round of 32	Round of 16	Quarterfinals	Semifinals	Final	
Athlete	Event	Opposition Result	Opposition Result	Opposition Result	Opposition Result	Opposition Result	Opposition Result	Rank
Alen Rahimić	56 kg	—	Bye	Shakh (BLR); L 0–5	did not advance			
Nikola Ivković	60 kg	—	Chalabiyev (AZE); L 0–5	did not advance				
Haris Mešanović	64 kg	—	Erdemir (TUR); L 0–5	did not advance				
Adem Fetahović	69 kg	Bye	Schachidov (GER); W 3–2	Sotomayor (AZE); L 1–4	did not advance			
Radenko Tomić	81 kg	—	Mužík (CZE); L 1–4	did not advance				
Džemal Bošnjak	91 kg	—	Filipi (CRO); L 2–3	did not advance				
Dušan Veletić	+91 kg	—	Hovhannisyan (ARM); L 2–3	did not advance				

== Cycling ==
=== Road ===
Athlete	Event	Time	Rank
Vedad Karić	Road race	did not finish	
Vedad Karić	Time trial	38:05.69	33
Nedžad Mahmić	Road race	did not finish	

== Canoe sprint ==
Athlete	Event	Heats		Semifinal		Final	
Athlete	Event	Time	Rank	Time	Rank	Time	Rank
Darko Savić	K-1 1000 m	3:58.566	8	did not advance			

== Judo ==
Men

Athlete	Event	Round of 64	Round of 32	Round of 16	Quarterfinals	Semifinals	Repechage	Final / BM	
Athlete	Event	Opposition Result	Opposition Result	Opposition Result	Opposition Result	Opposition Result	Opposition Result	Opposition Result	Rank
Petar Zadro	–66 kg	Bye	Vieru (MDA); L 0–1s2	did not advance					
Harun Sadiković	+100 kg	—	Tsiarpitski (BLR); L 0s1–11	did not advance					

Women

Athlete	Event	Round of 32	Round of 16	Quarterfinals	Semifinals	Repechage	Final / BM	
Athlete	Event	Opposition Result	Opposition Result	Opposition Result	Opposition Result	Opposition Result	Opposition Result	Rank
Aleksandra Samardžić	–70 kg	Mayershon (ISR); W 1s2–0s1	Van Dijke (NED); L 1s1–10s1	did not advance				
Larisa Cerić	+78 kg	Bye	Zabić (SRB); W 10s2–0s2	Tarasova (UKR); W 10s1–1s1	Nunes (POR); W 10s2–0s1	Bye	Slutskaya (BLR); L 0h–10s1	2nd place, silver medalist(s)

== Shooting ==
Athlete	Event	Qualification		Final	
Athlete	Event	Points	Rank	Points	Rank
Nedžad Džanković	10 m air rifle	614.6	39	did not advance	

== Table tennis ==
Athlete	Event	Round 1	Round 2	Round 3	Round 4	Quarterfinals	Semifinals	Final / BM	
Athlete	Event	Opposition Result	Opposition Result	Opposition Result	Opposition Result	Opposition Result	Opposition Result	Opposition Result	Rank
Emina Hadžiahmetović	Women's singles	Bye	Moret (SUI); L 1–4	did not advance					
