= North Macedonia at the 2019 European Games =

- IOC code: MKD
- NOC: Olympic Committee of North Macedonia
- Website: mok.org.mk

in Minsk, Belarus 21–30 June
- Competitors: 12 in 8 sports
- Medals: Gold 0 Silver 0 Bronze 0 Total 0

European Games appearances (overview)
- 2015; 2019; 2023; 2027

North Macedonia competed at the 2019 European Games in Minsk from 21 to 30 June 2019. North Macedonia was represented by 12 athletes in 8 sports.

== Competitors ==
| Sport | Men | Women | Total |
|---|---|---|---|
| Boxing | 3 | 0 | 3 |
| Canoe sprint | 1 | 0 | 1 |
| Cycling | 1 | 0 | 1 |
| Judo | 0 | 1 | 1 |
| Karate | 1 | 0 | 1 |
| Sambo | 1 | 0 | 1 |
| Shooting | 1 | 0 | 1 |
| Wrestling | 3 | 0 | 3 |
| Total | 11 | 1 | 12 |

== Boxing ==
Men

| Athlete | Event | Round of 32 | Round of 16 | Quarterfinals | Semifinals | Final | |
| Athlete | Event | Opposition Result | Opposition Result | Opposition Result | Opposition Result | Opposition Result | Rank |
|---|---|---|---|---|---|---|---|
| Jasim Ljama | 60 kg | — | Černoga (SLO); L 0–5 | did not advance | | | |
| Goce Janevski | 69 kg | — | Molloy (IRL); L 0–5 | did not advance | | | |
| Arsim Etemi | 75 kg | — | van der Pas (NED); L 0–5 | did not advance | | | |

== Canoe sprint ==
Men

| Athlete | Event | Heats | | Semifinal | | Final | |
| Athlete | Event | Time | Rank | Time | Rank | Time | Rank |
|---|---|---|---|---|---|---|---|
| Vladimir Maleski | K–1 200 m | 41.028 | 7 QS | 40.101 | 9 | Did not advance | |
| Vladimir Maleski | K–1 1000 m | 4:09.808 | 9 | Did not advance | | | |

== Cycling ==
=== Road ===
Men

| Athlete | Event | Time | Rank |
|---|---|---|---|
| Andrej Petrovski | Road race | 4:22:26 | 106 |
| Andrej Petrovski | Time trial | 36:49.11 | 28 |

== Judo ==
Women

| Athlete | Event | Round of 32 | Round of 16 | Quarterfinals | Semifinals | Repechage | Final / BM | |
| Athlete | Event | Opposition Result | Opposition Result | Opposition Result | Opposition Result | Opposition Result | Opposition Result | Rank |
|---|---|---|---|---|---|---|---|---|
| Arbresha Rexhepi | –52 kg | Danilovich (BLR); L 0–11 | Did not advance | | | | | |

== Karate ==
Kumite

Men

| Athletes | Event | Group stage | | | | Semifinals | Final | Rank |
| Athletes | Event | Opposition Score | Opposition Score | Opposition Score | Rank | Opposition Score | Opposition Score | Rank |
|---|---|---|---|---|---|---|---|---|
| Emil Pavlov | 60 kg | Crescenzo (ITA); D 0–0 | Farzaliyev (AZE); L 3–3 | Bulatau (BLR); W 5–0 | 3 | Did not advance | | |

== Sambo ==
Men

| Athlete | Event | Quarterfinals | Semifinals | Final / BM | |
| Athlete | Event | Opposition Result | Opposition Result | Opposition Result | Rank |
|---|---|---|---|---|---|
| Dalibor Bogdanov | −68 kg | Koksha (BLR); L 0–2 | Repechage; Ivanov (BUL); L 0–9 | Did not advance | |

== Shooting ==
Men

| Athlete | Event | Qualification | | Final | |
| Athlete | Event | Points | Rank | Points | Rank |
|---|---|---|---|---|---|
| Borjan Brankovski | 10 m air pistol | 567 | 30 | Did not advance | |

== Wrestling ==
Men's Freestyle

| Athlete | Event | Round of 16 | Quarterfinal | Semifinal | Repechage | Final / BM | |
| Athlete | Event | Opposition Result | Opposition Result | Opposition Result | Opposition Result | Opposition Result | Rank |
|---|---|---|---|---|---|---|---|
| Vladimir Egorov | −57 kg | Davidovi (ITA); W 3–2 | Amiraslanov (AZE); L 0–4 | Did not advance | Vangelov (BUL); L 3–3 | did not advance | |
| Fati Vejseli | −65 kg | Chakaev (RUS); L 1–9 | did not advance | | | | |
| Magomedgadji Nurov | −97 kg | Krasauskas (LTU); W 10–0 | Sadulaev (RUS); L 0–6 | Did not advance | Szabo (HUN); W 11–0 | Hushtyn (BLR); L 1–3 | 5 |
