= Gymnastics at the 2019 European Games – Men's rings =

Men's rings at the 2019 European Games
- Venue: Minsk-Arena
- Date: 30 June
- Competitors: 6 from 6 nations
- Winning score: 14.800

Medalists
| gold medal | Marco Lodadio | Italy |
| silver medal | Vahagn Davtyan | Armenia |
| bronze medal | Ihor Radivilov | Ukraine |

The men's artistic gymnastics rings competition at the 2019 European Games was held at the Minsk-Arena on 30 June 2019.

== Qualification ==
The top six gymnasts with one per country advanced to the final.

| Rank | Gymnast | D Score | E Score | Pen. | Total | Qual. |
|---|---|---|---|---|---|---|
| 1 | Samir Aït Saïd (FRA) | 6.300 | 8.533 | | 14.833 | Q |
| 2 | Ihor Radivilov (UKR) | 6.000 | 8.700 | | 14.700 | Q |
| 3 | İbrahim Çolak (TUR) | 6.200 | 8.466 | | 14.666 | Q |
| 4 | Marco Lodadio (ITA) | 6.300 | 8.233 | | 14.533 | Q |
| 5 | Vahagn Davtyan (ARM) | 6.100 | 8.400 | | 14.500 | Q |
| 6 | Artur Tovmasyan (ARM) | 5.800 | 8.600 | | 14.400 | |
| 7 | Dmitriy Lankin (RUS) | 6.100 | 8.266 | | 14.366 | Q |
| 8 | David Belyavskiy (RUS) | 5.600 | 8.500 | | 14.100 | |
| 9 | Néstor Abad (ESP) | 5.500 | 8.300 | | 13.800 | R1 |
| 10 | Artur Davtyan (ARM) | 5.300 | 8.366 | | 13.666 | |
| 11 | Nicolau Mir (ESP) | 5.000 | 8.500 | | 13.500 | |
| 12 | Nikolaos Iliopoulos (GRE) | 4.700 | 8.566 | | 13.266 | R2 |
| 13 | Vladislav Polyashov (RUS) | 5.000 | 8.233 | | 13.233 | |
| 14 | Oleg Verniaiev (UKR) | 4.900 | 8.300 | | 13.200 | |
| 15 | Joel Plata (ESP) | 5.000 | 8.133 | | 13.133 | |
| 16 | Marios Georgiou (CYP) | 5.000 | 8.100 | | 13.100 | R3 |

== Final ==
| Rank | Gymnast | D Score | E Score | Pen. | Total |
|---|---|---|---|---|---|
| 1st place, gold medalist(s) | Marco Lodadio (ITA) | 6.300 | 8.500 | | 14.800 |
| 2nd place, silver medalist(s) | Vahagn Davtyan (ARM) | 6.100 | 8.666 | | 14.766 |
| 3rd place, bronze medalist(s) | Ihor Radivilov (UKR) | 6.000 | 8.733 | | 14.733 |
| 4 | İbrahim Çolak (TUR) | 6.200 | 8.500 | | 14.700 |
| 5 | Samir Aït Saïd (FRA) | 6.300 | 8.400 | | 14.700 |
| 6 | Dmitriy Lankin (RUS) | 6.100 | 8.266 | | 14.366 |
