= Marco Lodadio =

Italian artistic gymnast

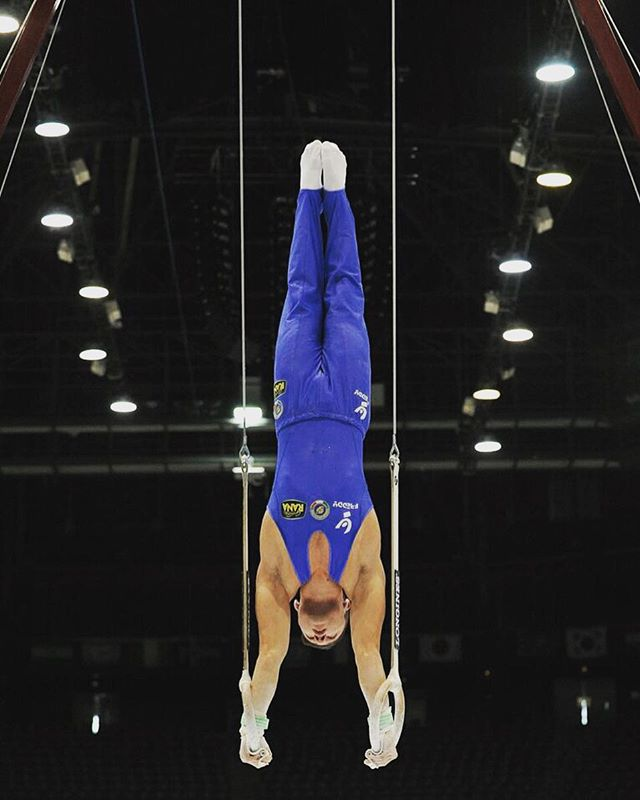

Personal information
- Born: 24 March 1992 (age 34) Frascati, Italy
- Height: 160 cm (5 ft 3 in)

Gymnastics career
- Discipline: Men's artistic gymnastics
- Country represented: Italy (2013–present)
- Head coach: Luigi Rocchini
Medal record
Men's artistic gymnastics
Representing Italy
World Championships
Silver medal – second place	2019 Stuttgart	Rings
Silver medal – second place	2021 Kitakyushu	Rings
Bronze medal – third place	2018 Doha	Rings
European Games
Gold medal – first place	2019 Minsk	Rings
European Championships
Gold medal – first place	2023 Antalya	Team
Silver medal – second place	2019 Szczecin	Rings
Bronze medal – third place	2024 Rimini	Team
Mediterranean Games
Silver medal – second place	2018 Tarragona	Rings
Silver medal – second place	2022 Oran	Team
FIG World Cup
Event / 1st / 2nd / 3rd; World Challenge Cup / 0 / 2 / 1

Marco Lodadio (born 24 March 1992) is an Italian artistic gymnast. He primarily competed as a still rings specialist and is a two-time World silver medalist (2019, 2021) on the apparatus. He is the 2019 European Games still rings champion and the 2023 European Championships team champion.

== Gymnastics career ==
Lodadio began gymnastics in 2001. In 2007, he injured his shoulder and was not able to compete for two years. He won a bronze medal on the vault at the 2010 Junior European Championships.

Lodadio competed on the vault and the rings at the 2013 World Championships but did not advance into either final. He competed with the Italian team that placed seventh at the 2016 European Championships. He took a break from the sport after failing to qualify for the 2016 Summer Olympics.

Lodadio won silver medals on the rings at the 2017 Koper and Szombathely World Challenge Cups. He helped Italy place eighth in the team final at the 2018 European Championships. At the 2018 Mediterranean Games, he helped Italy place fourth, and he won a silver medal in the rings final. At the Koper World Challenge Cup, he won the rings bronze medal. He then won the bronze medal at the 2018 World Championships.

At the 2019 European Championships held in Szczecin, Poland, he won the silver medal on the rings. He then won the gold medal in the rings event at the 2019 European Games held in Minsk, Belarus. He also won the silver medal in the rings at the World Artistic Gymnastics Championships held in Stuttgart, Germany. As a result, he qualified to represent Italy at the 2020 Summer Olympics in Tokyo, Japan. There, he finished ninth on the rings in the qualfiications and was the first reserve for the final.

At the 2021 World Championships, Lodadio was initially the first reserve for the final. When Zhang Boheng withdrew, he was called up to compete, and he won the silver medal. He won a silver medal with the Italian team at the 2022 Mediterranean Games.

Lodadio won a silver medal on the rings at the 2023 DTB Pokal Team Challenge. At the 2023 European Championships, Macchiati won a team gold medal alongside Yumin Abbadini, Lorenzo Minh Casali, Matteo Levantesi, and Mario Macchiati. This marked the first time Italy won a team title at the European Men's Artistic Gymnastics Championships.

Lodadio competed at the 2024 European Championships where he helped Italy win bronze behind Ukraine and Great Britain.

== Competitive history ==
Year	Event	Team	AA	FX	PH	SR	VT	PB	HB
2016
2016	European Championships	7							
2018
2018	World Championships					3rd place, bronze medalist(s)			
2019
2019	European Championships					2nd place, silver medalist(s)			
2019	European Games					1st place, gold medalist(s)			
2019	World Championships					2nd place, silver medalist(s)			
2021
2021	Olympic Games					R1			
2021	World Championships					2nd place, silver medalist(s)			
2023	DTB Pokal Team Challenge	4				2nd place, silver medalist(s)			
2023	European Championships	1st place, gold medalist(s)							
