= Regan Buckley =

Irish boxer (born 1997)

Personal information
- Nickname: Rocket
- Nationality: Irish
- Born: 5 March 1997 (age 29) County Wicklow, Ireland
- Weight: Flyweight

Boxing career
- Stance: Orthodox

Boxing record
- Total fights: 2
- Wins: 2
- Win by KO: 0
- Losses: 0
Medal record
Men's amateur boxing
Representing Ireland
European Games
Bronze medal – third place	2019 Minsk	Light flyweight

Regan James Buckley, also called Regan Daly, (born 5 March 1997) is an Irish professional boxer. As an amateur he won a bronze medal at the 2019 European Games.

== Early life ==
Buckley is a native of County Wicklow.

== Career ==
Buckley boxes at St Teresa's Boxing Club in Bray.

He fought twice as a pro, defeating Gary Reeve and Carl McDonald in 2018. However, he returned to amateur status to aim at the 2020 Olympics.

Buckley won bronze at the 2019 European Games in Minsk.
