= Artur Hovhannisyan (boxer) =

Armenian boxer (born 1996)

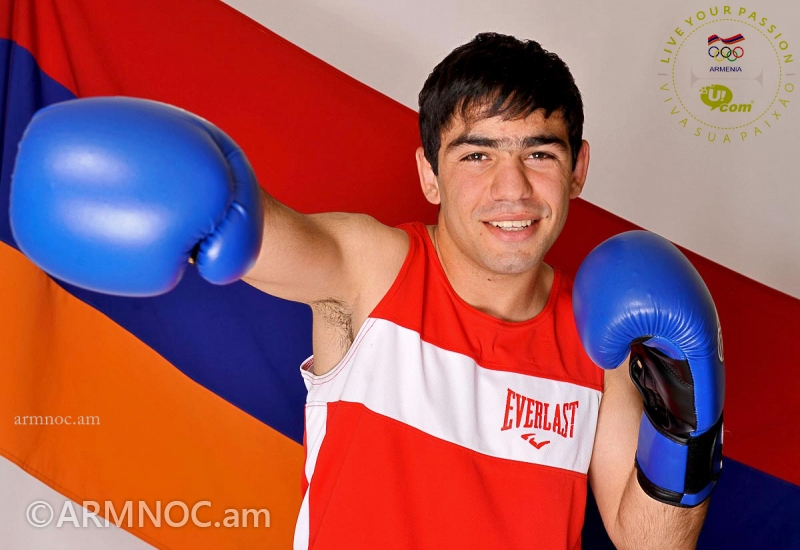

Personal information
- Born: 23 March 1996 (age 30) Gyumri, Armenia
- Height: 5 ft 2 in (157 cm)

Boxing career
Medal record
Men's amateur boxing
Representing Armenia
European Games
Gold medal – first place	2019 Minsk	Light-flyweight

Artur Hovhannisyan (born 23 March 1996) is an Armenian amateur boxer. He competed in the men's light-flyweight event at the 2016 Summer Olympics. He also won the gold medal in the men's light-flyweight at the 2019 European Games.
