= Ivan Tikhonov =

Azerbaijani artistic gymnast (born 1996)

- İvan Tixonov
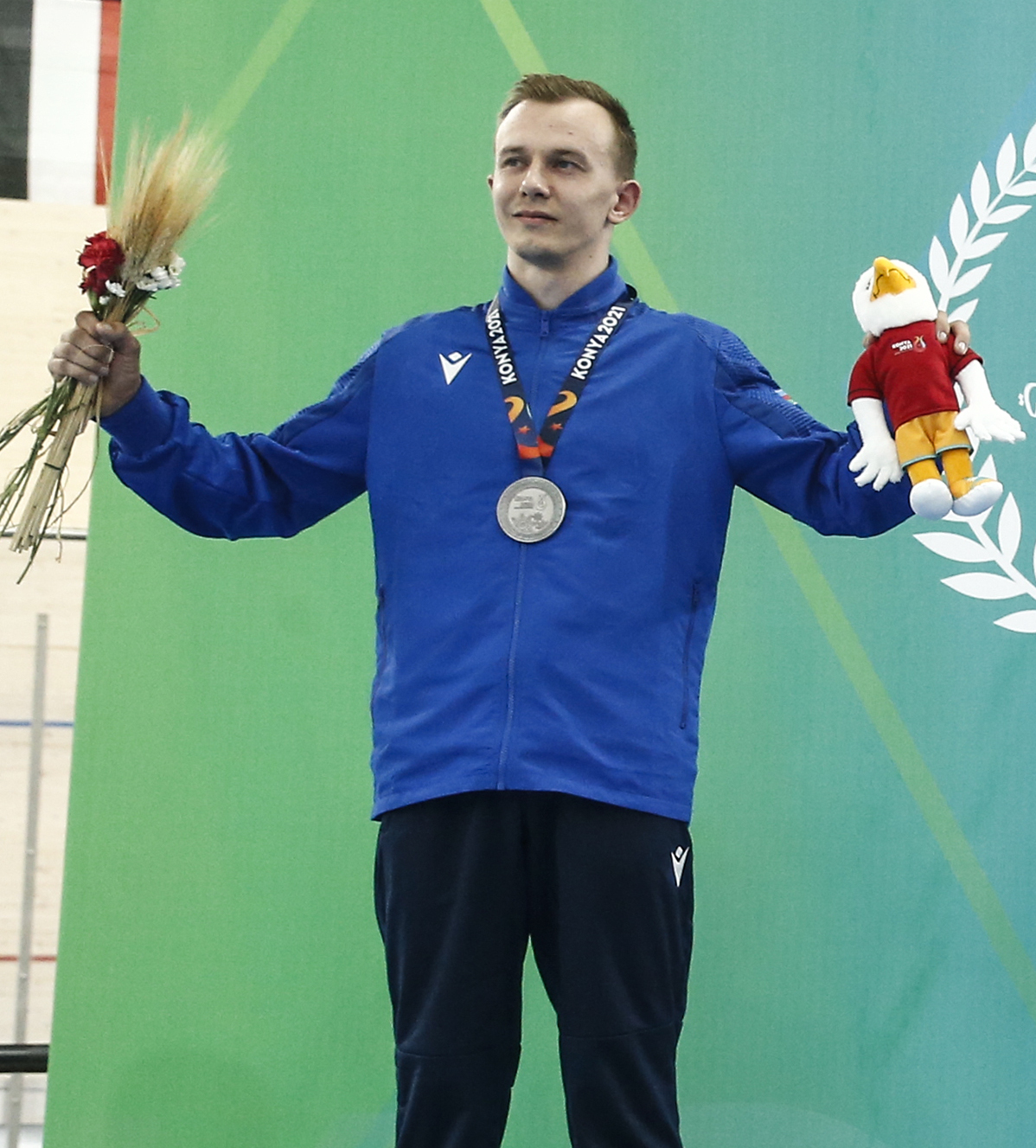
- Tikhonov at the 2021 Islamic Solidarity Games

Personal information
- Full name: Ivan Aleksandrovich Tikhonov
- Nickname: Vanya
- Born: 21 April 1996 (age 30) Syzran, Russia
- Height: 170 cm (5 ft 7 in)

Gymnastics career
- Country represented: Azerbaijan (2019–present)
- Former countries represented: Russia
- Training location: Baku, Azerbaijan
- Club: Ojaq Sports Club
Medal record
Men's artistic gymnastics
Representing Azerbaijan
Islamic Solidarity Games
Gold medal – first place	2021 Konya	Vault
Silver medal – second place	2021 Konya	All-around
Bronze medal – third place	2021 Konya	Horizontal bar
FIG World Cup
Event	1st	2nd	3rd
Apparatus World Cup	0	0	1
World Challenge Cup	0	0	2
Total	0	0	3

Ivan Aleksandrovich Tikhonov (Azerbaijani: İvan Tixonov, born 21 April 1996) is a Russian-born Azerbaijani artistic gymnast. At the 2021 Islamic Solidarity Games, he won the vault gold medal, the all-around silver medal, and the horizontal bar bronze medal. He represented Azerbaijan at the 2020 Summer Olympics.

== Gymnastics career ==
Tikhonov began gymnastics when he was six years old. He decided to switch his nationality to Azerbaijan at the recommendation of a coach, because he was only the reserve for the junior Russian national team. This change was approved by the International Gymnastics Federation in July 2018.

Tikhonov made his debut for Azerbaijan at the 2019 European Championships and finished 21st in the all-around final. He then won a bronze medal on the pommel horse at the 2019 Osijek World Challenge Cup, behind Robert Seligman and Nikolai Kuksenkov. At the 2019 European Games, he finished 14th in the all-around final, and was the second reserve for the vault final. He also advanced into the all-around final at the 2019 Summer Universiade and finished 11th. At the 2019 World Championships in Stuttgart, he finished 48th in the all-around during the qualification round and qualified for the 2020 Olympic Games.

Tikhonov finished eighth in the all-around at the 2021 European Championships. At the 2021 Varna World Challenge Cup, he won a bronze medal on the vault, behind Nazar Chepurnyi and Marian Drăgulescu. He then represented Azerbaijan and the postponed-2020 Summer Olympics and finished 45th in the all-around during the qualification round and did not advance into any finals.

Tikhonov initially finished fourth on the parallel bars at the 2022 Doha World Cup. However, Ivan Kuliak was stripped of his bronze medal after being sanctioned for wearing pro-war symbolism on the medal podium. He advanced to the vault final at the 2022 European Championships and finished sixth. He then competed at the 2021 Islamic Solidarity Games, held in 2022 due to the COVID-19 pandemic. He won the silver medal in the all-around behind Turkey's Adem Asil. In the event finals, he won the gold medal on the vault and the bronze medal on the horizontal bar. Additionally, he finished seventh on the floor exercise, fifth on the pommel horse, fourth on the still rings, and seventh on the parallel bars.

== See also ==
- Nationality changes in gymnastics
