= Romania at the 2019 European Games =

- IOC code: ROU
- NOC: Romanian Olympic and Sports Committee
- Website: www.cosr.ro

in Minsk, Belarus 21 – 30 June 2019
- Competitors: 130 in 15 sports
- Medals Ranked 26th: Gold 2 Silver 3 Bronze 5 Total 10

European Games appearances (overview)
- 2015; 2019; 2023; 2027

Romania competed at the 2019 European Games, in Minsk, Belarus from 21 to 30 June 2019. Romania previously competed at the 2015 European Games in Baku, Azerbaijan, where it won 12 medals, including three golds.

== Archery ==
Recurve

| Athlete | Event | Ranking round | | Round of 64 | Round of 32 | Round of 16 | Quarterfinals | Semifinals | Final / BM | |
| Athlete | Event | Score | Seed | Opposition Score | Opposition Score | Opposition Score | Opposition Score | Opposition Score | Opposition Score | Rank |
|---|---|---|---|---|---|---|---|---|---|---|
| Beatrice Mikloș | Women's individual | 610 | 32 | Unruh (GER) | | | | | | |

== Badminton ==
| Athletes | Event | Group stage | | | | Round of 16 | Quarterfinals | Semifinals | Final | Rank |
| Athletes | Event | Opposition Score | Opposition Score | Opposition Score | Rank | Opposition Score | Opposition Score | Opposition Score | Opposition Score | Rank |
|---|---|---|---|---|---|---|---|---|---|---|
| Collins Valentine Filimon | Men's singles | Malkov (RUS) | Mann (LUX) | Qowimuramadhoni (AZE) | | | | | | |
