= Minsk Sports Palace =

Sports venue in Minsk, Belarus

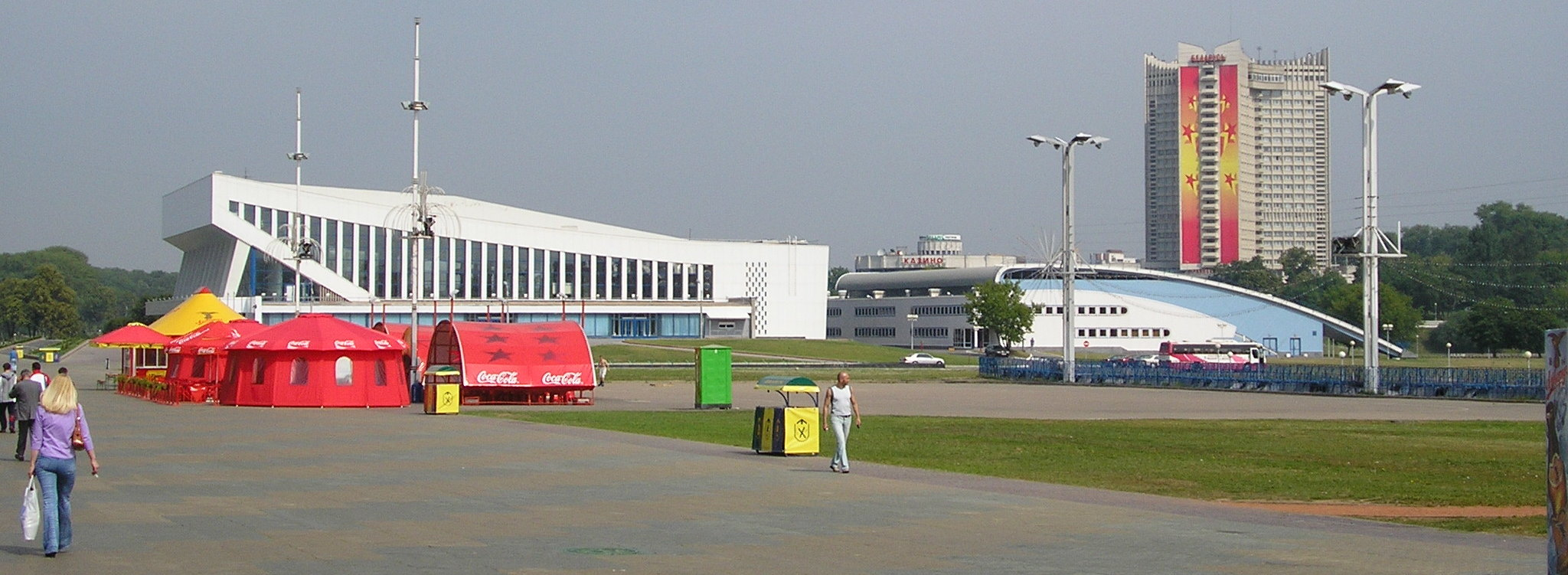
- Interactive map of Minsk Sports Palace
- Location: Minsk, Belarus
- Coordinates: 53.910679°N 27.54958°E
- Owner: Ministry of Sport and Tourism
- Capacity: 3,311 (sport); 4,500 (concerts)

Construction
- Groundbreaking: September 1963
- Opened: May 1966
- Renovated: 2001–04
- Expanded: 1999
- Architects: Filimonov S.D. Malyshev V.N.
- Structural engineer: Korzhevsky V.V.
- Main contractor: Belgosproekt

Tenants
- Tivali Minsk (1966–2001); HC Dinamo Minsk (2004–2010)

Minsk Sports Palace is an indoor sports arena, located in Minsk, Belarus. The arena seats 4,842 spectators and opened in 1966. It hosts various indoor events, including HC Dynamo Minsk and the Kontinental Hockey League before Minsk-Arena was completed.

== History ==
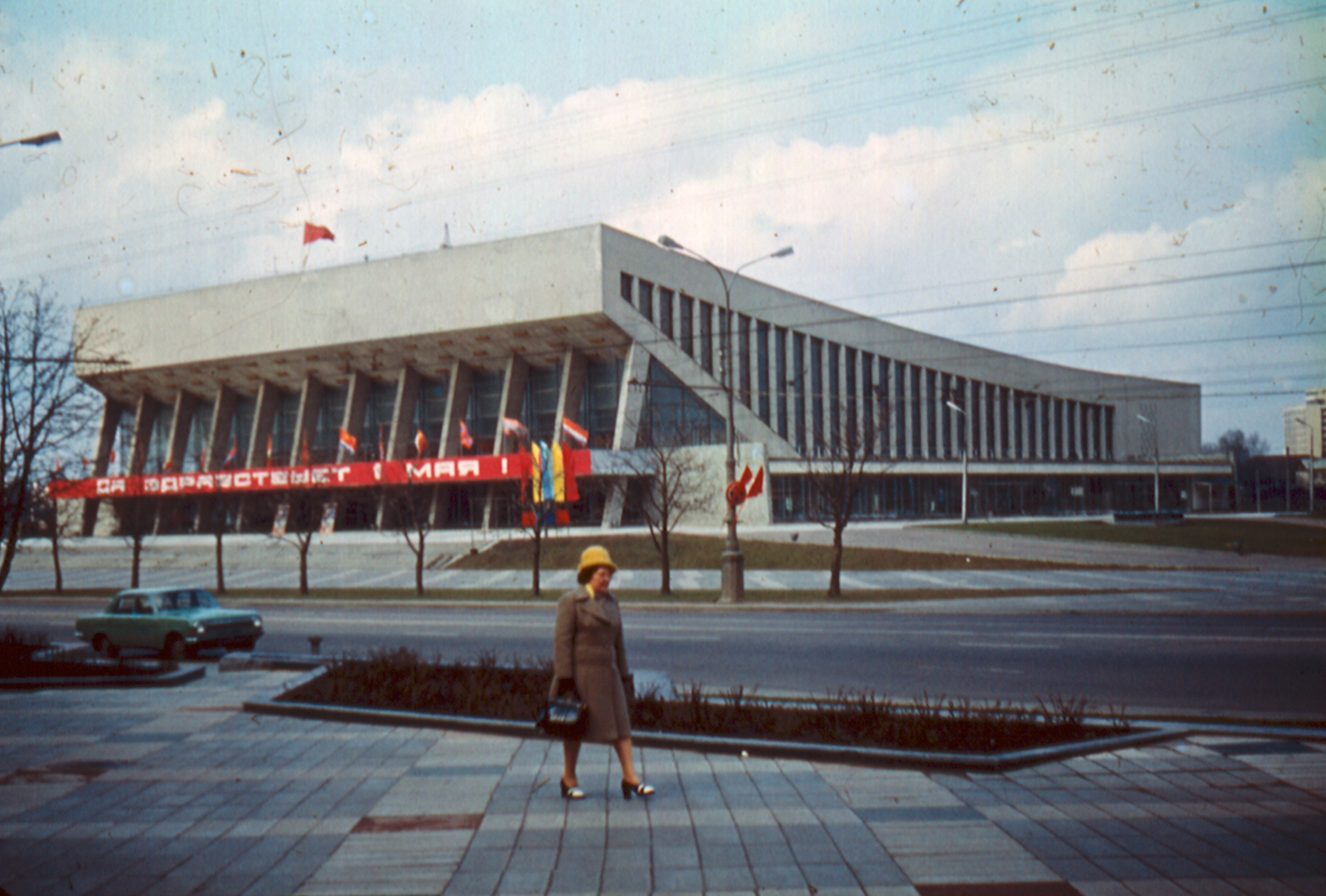
Minsk Sports Palace in 1981

From the 1960s–1980s, the largest state events were held at the Sports Palace. Championships and international tournaments in wrestling, fencing, boxing, weightlifting, rhythmic and artistic gymnastics and other sports were also held there, including matches in the championship hockey club of the Union Dynamo and handball SKA. The Palace was also a venue of the largest concerts and the Communist Party meetings. In 1990, the Palace premises were leased to various exhibition and sporting events.

== Buildings ==
=== Large arena ===
The main arena of the Palace of Sports is a universal sport and entertainment room with a hockey box sizes of 61×30 meters. The total capacity of the stands is 3,311 visitors (including the main grandstand - 3,074 seats, small podium - 237 seats) in the sport even version; when the arene is transformed to the concert version, 4,500 spectators can attend the event.

=== Small arena ===
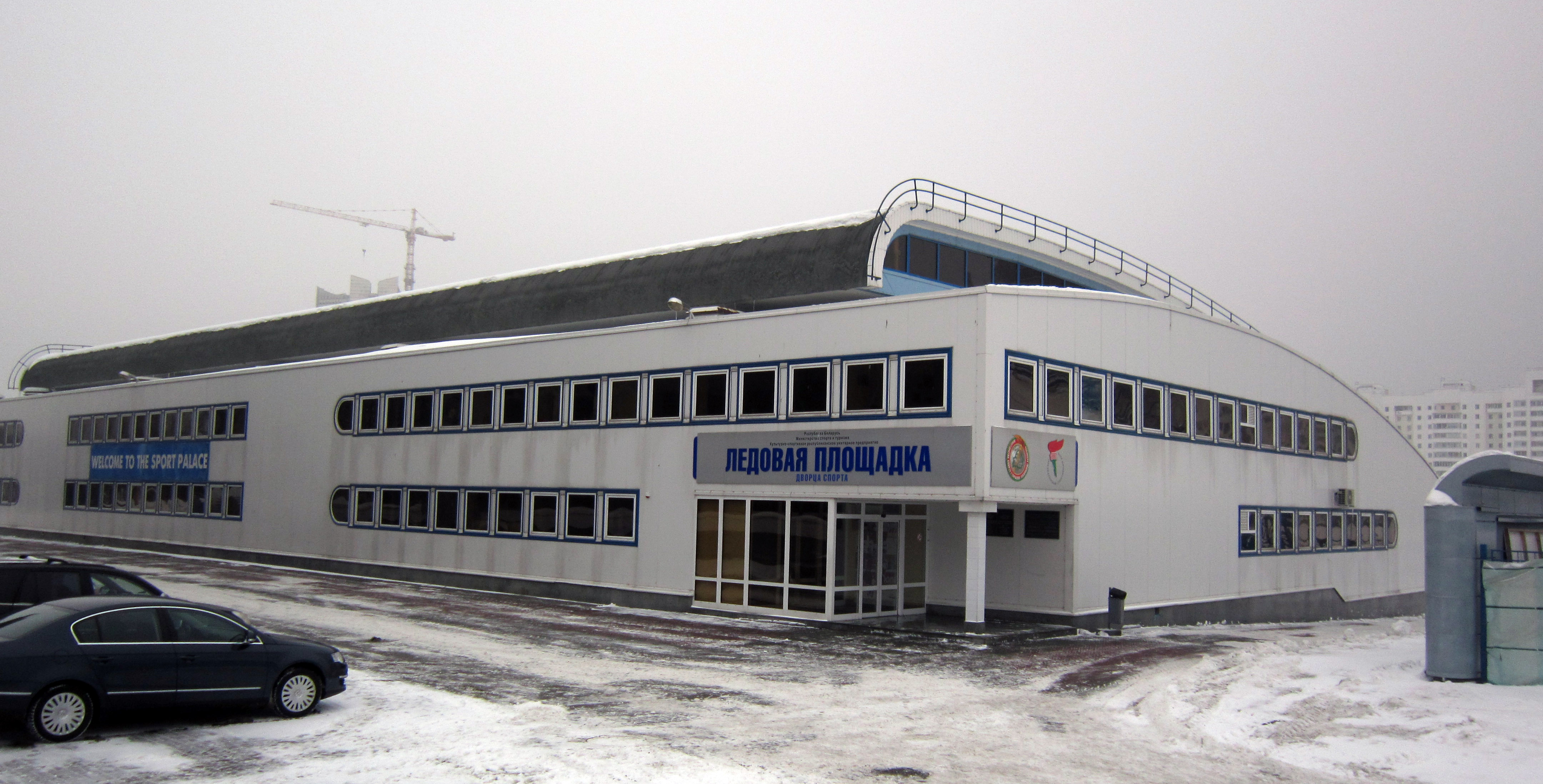
The small ice arena in 2012

In 1999, the indoor training arena was built behind the Sports Palace. The small Sports Palace arena is used mainly as a platform for hockey and figure skating training sessions.

== Sporting events ==
- 1975 World Sambo Championships
- 1975 World Wrestling Championships
- 1986 FIBA World Championship for Women
- 2010 IIHF World U18 Championships
- 2015 AMF Futsal Men's World Cup
- 2019 European Judo Championships

== Concerts ==
- Nazareth - November 22, 1999
- Deep Purple - November 5, 2000 and March 27, 2011
- Motörhead - December 4, 2000
- Natalia Oreiro - March 13, 2002
- Scorpions - November 5, 2002 and November 7, 2008
- Whitesnake - November 10, 2004
- Accept - April 29, 2005 and March 7, 2011
- Zemfira - October 1, 2005 and February 20, 2008
- Ronnie James Dio - October 2, 2005
- W.A.S.P. - November 8, 2006
- Korol i Shut - April 22, 2007, April 20, 2009 and March 28, 2010
- Toto Cutugno - November 17, 2007
- Bryan Adams - December 2, 2007
- Grigory Leps - February 25, 2008
- Valery Meladze - March 23, 2008
- Europe - March 28, 2008
- Thomas Anders - April 18, 2008
- Lyapis Trubetskoy - May 9, 2008 and March 9, 2009
- Okean Elzy - May 29, 2008 and May 12, 2010
- Tarja Turunen - November 4, 2008 and March 4, 2012
- Vyacheslav Butusov - December 7, 2008 and May 27, 2010, with U-Piter
- Over the Rainbow - February 14, 2009
- OneRepublic - November 5, 2014
- Sepultura - March 4, 2009
- Jethro Tull - March 10, 2009
- Smokie - March 28, 2009, December 10, 2010
- Valery Kipelov - April 16, 2009, April 29, 2011
- Enrique Iglesias - April 24, 2009
- Alla Pugacheva - May 7, 2009
- Alexander Rybak - September 28, 2009
- MakSim - October 17, 2009 & March 2, 2011
- Splean - October 25, 2009
- Scooter - October 27, 2009
- Chris Rea - February 14, 2010
- Vanessa-Mae - June 20, 2010
- F.R David - February 2, 2013
- Limp Bizkit - October 5, 2010 and December 2, 2013
- Garou - October 21, 2010
- a-ha - November 6, 2010
- Vladimir Kuzmin - November 15, 2010
- Mumiy Troll - November 24, 2010
- Within Temptation - October 26, 2015

== See also ==
- List of indoor arenas in Belarus
