= Georgia at the 2019 European Games =

- IOC code: GEO
- NOC: Georgian National Olympic Committee
- Website: geonoc.org.ge

in Minsk, Belarus 21 June 2019 – 30 June 2019
- Competitors: 61 in 11 sports
- Flag bearer: Guram Tushishvili (Judo)
- Medals Ranked 6th: Gold 7 Silver 9 Bronze 14 Total 30

European Games appearances (overview)
- 2015; 2019; 2023; 2027

Georgia participated in the 2019 European Games held in Minsk from 21 to 30 June 2019. Georgia was represented by 61 athletes in 11 sports in these competitions.

== Archery ==
Recurve

Athlete	Event	Ranking round		Round of 64	Round of 32	Round of 16	Quarterfinals	Semifinals	Final / BM	
Athlete	Event	Score	Seed	Opposition Score	Opposition Score	Opposition Score	Opposition Score	Opposition Score	Opposition Score	Rank
Jaba Moseshvili	Men's individual	648	23	Mihalić (CRO)						
Tsiko Putkaradze	Women's individual	602	39	Zuzańska (POL)						
Jaba Moseshvili; Tsiko Putkaradze	Mixed team	1250	17	—	Poland; W 5–1	Netherlands; L 4–5	Did not advance			9

== Boxing ==
Men

Athlete	Event	Round of 32	Round of 16	Quarterfinals	Semifinals	Final	
Athlete	Event	Opposition Result	Opposition Result	Opposition Result	Opposition Result	Opposition Result	Rank
Sakhil Alakhverdovi	49 kg						
Nodari Darbaidze	52 kg						
Artyush Gomtsyan	56 kg						
Otar Eranosyan	60 kg						
Lasha Guluri	64 kg						
Ekskherkhan Madiev	69 kg						
Giorgi Kharabadze	75 kg						
Giorgi Manjavidze	81 kg						
Nikoloz Begadze	91 kg						
Mikheil Bakhtidze	+91 kg						

== Canoeing ==
=== Sprint ===
Men

- Badri Kavelashvili
- Zaza Nadiradze

Women

- Mariam Kerdikashvili

== Cycling ==
Men

Athlete	Event	Time	Rank
Tengiz Barbakadze	Men's road race		
Tengiz Barbakadze	Men's time trial		

== See also ==
- List of multi-sport events
- Sport in Georgia
