= Shooting at the 2019 European Games – Men's skeet =

Men's skeet at the 2019 European Games
- Venue: Sporting Club
- Dates: 26–27 June
- Competitors: 29 from 19 nations

Medalists
gold medal	Stefan Nilsson	Sweden
silver medal	Tomáš Nýdrle	Czech Republic
bronze medal	Gabriele Rossetti	Italy

The men's skeet event at the 2019 European Games in Minsk, Belarus took place from 26 to 27 June at the Sporting Club.

== Schedule ==
All times are FET (UTC+03:00)

Date	Time	Event
Wednesday, 26 June 2019	09:00	Qualification day 1
Thursday, 27 June 2019	09:00	Qualification day 2
Thursday, 27 June 2019	18:00	Final

== Records ==
Prior to this competition, the existing world, European and Games records were as follows.

Qualification
World Record	Valerio Luchini (ITA)	125	Beijing, China	9 July 2014
European Record	Valerio Luchini (ITA)	125	Beijing, China	9 July 2014
Games Record	Anthony Terras (FRA)	124	Baku, Azerbaijan	21 June 2015
Final
World Record	Angad Vir Singh Bajwa (IND)	60	Kuwait City, Kuwait	6 November 2018
European Record	Riccardo Filippelli (ITA); Ben Llewellin (GBR)	59	New Delhi, India	26 October 2017
Games Record	—	—	—	—

== Results ==
=== Qualification ===
The qualification round took place on 26 and 27 June to determine the qualifiers for the finals.

Rank	Athlete	Country	Day 1	Day 2	Total	S-off	Notes
1	Tomáš Nýdrle	Czech Republic	74	48	122	+6	Q
2	Emil Kjelgaard Petersen	Denmark	73	49	122	+4	Q
3	Ben Llewellin	Great Britain	73	49	122	+3	Q
4	Gabriele Rossetti	Italy	73	49	122	+1	Q
5	Stefan Nilsson	Sweden	72	49	121	+12	Q
6	Éric Delaunay	France	72	49	121	+11	Q
7	Juan José Aramburu	Spain	73	48	121	+5	
8	Nicolas Vasiliou	Cyprus	72	48	120		
9	Erik Watndal	Norway	72	48	120		
10	Jesper Hansen	Denmark	73	47	120		
11	Jakub Tomeček	Czech Republic	72	48	120		
12	Marcus Svensson	Sweden	70	49	119		
13	Anthony Terras	France	72	47	119		
14	Sven Korte	Germany	70	48	118		
15	Georgios Achilleos	Cyprus	71	47	118		
16	Mykola Milchev	Ukraine	69	47	116		
17	Nikolaos Mavrommatis	Greece	70	46	116		
18	Alexander Zemlin	Russia	71	44	115		
19	Jorgen Engen	Norway	70	45	115		
20	Tommi Takanen	Finland	71	43	114		
21	Jeremy Harry Bird	Great Britain	71	42	113		
22	Oskari Kossi	Finland	68	45	113		
23	Riccardo Filippelli	Italy	69	44	113		
24	Jakub Werys	Poland	67	44	111		
25	Mikhail Sharapov	Russia	65	45	110		
26	Hákon Svavarsson	Iceland	67	42	109		
27	Ronaldas Račinskas	Lithuania	67	41	108		
28	Emin Jafarov	Azerbaijan	65	42	107		
29	Andrei Gerachtchenko	Belarus	58	43	101		

=== Final ===
The final round took place on 27 June to determine the final classification.

Rank	Athlete	Series						S-off	Notes
Rank	Athlete	1	2	3	4	5	6	S-off	Notes
1st place, gold medalist(s)	Stefan Nilsson (SWE)	9	18	27	37	47	57		GR
2nd place, silver medalist(s)	Tomáš Nýdrle (CZE)	10	19	27	37	46	56		
3rd place, bronze medalist(s)	Gabriele Rossetti (ITA)	9	19	28	37	46			
4	Emil Kjelgaard Petersen (DEN)	8	17	26	35				
5	Ben Llewellin (GBR)	8	18	26					
6	Éric Delaunay (FRA)	8	16						
