= Shooting at the 2019 European Games – Mixed team skeet =

Mixed team skeet at the 2019 European Games
- Venue: Sporting Club
- Dates: 28 June
- Competitors: 38 from 14 nations

Medalists
gold medal	Gabriele Rossetti; Chiara Cainero	Italy
silver medal	Riccardo Filippelli; Diana Bacosi	Italy
bronze medal	Jakub Tomeček; Barbora Šumová	Czech Republic

The mixed team skeet shooting event at the 2019 European Games in Minsk, Belarus took place on 28 June at the Sporting Club.

== Schedule ==
All times are FET (UTC+03:00)

Date	Time	Event
Friday, 28 June 2019	09:00	Qualification
Friday, 28 June 2019	15:15	Final

== Records ==
Prior to this competition, the existing world, European and Games records were as follows.

Qualification
World Record	—	—	—	—
European Record	Italy	145	Leobersdorf, Austria	12 August 2018
Games Record	—	—	—	—
Final
World Record	—	—	—	—
European Record	France	55	Leobersdorf, Austria	12 August 2018
Games Record	—	—	—	—

== Results ==
=== Qualification ===
The qualification round took place on 28 June to determine the qualifiers for the finals.

Rank	Nation	Athletes	Score	Notes
1	Italy	Gabriele Rossetti	146	ER, GR, QG
1	Italy	Chiara Cainero	146	ER, GR, QG
2	Italy	Riccardo Filippelli	144	QG
2	Italy	Diana Bacosi	144	QG
3	Great Britain	Ben Llewellin	143	QB
3	Great Britain	Amber Hill	143	QB
4	Czech Republic	Jakub Tomeček	139	QB
4	Czech Republic	Barbora Šumová	139	QB
5	France	Anthony Terras	138	
5	France	Lucie Anastassiou	138	
6	Cyprus	Georgios Achilleos	138	
6	Cyprus	Panayiota Andreou	138	
7	Cyprus	Nicolas Vasiliou	137	
7	Cyprus	Andri Eleftheriou	137	
8	Russia	Alexander Zemlin	137	
8	Russia	Albina Shakirova	137	
9	Azerbaijan	Emin Jafarov	136	
9	Azerbaijan	Nurlana Jafarova	136	
10	Poland	Jakub Werys	136	
10	Poland	Aleksandra Jarmolińska	136	
11	Ukraine	Mykola Milchev	134	
11	Ukraine	Iryna Malovichko	134	
12	Norway	Erik Watndal	134	
12	Norway	Malin Farsjø	134	
13	Czech Republic	Tomáš Nýdrle	134	
13	Czech Republic	Martina Skalická	134	
14	Sweden	Stefan Nilsson	134	
14	Sweden	Victoria Larsson	134	
15	Great Britain	Jeremy Harry Bird	131	
15	Great Britain	Elena Allen	131	
16	Lithuania	Ronaldas Račinskas	131	
16	Lithuania	Alisa Bogdanova	131	
17	France	Éric Delaunay	130	
17	France	Noémie Battault	130	
18	Finland	Oskari Kossi	129	
18	Finland	Marjut Heinonen	129	
19	Germany	Sven Korte	128	
19	Germany	Vanessa Hauff	128	

=== Finals ===
The finals round took place on 28 June to determine the final classification.

Rank	Nation	Athletes	Score	S-off
Gold medal match
1st place, gold medalist(s)	Italy	Gabriele Rossetti; Chiara Cainero	33	+11
2nd place, silver medalist(s)	Italy	Riccardo Filippelli; Diana Bacosi	33	+10
Bronze medal match
3rd place, bronze medalist(s)	Czech Republic	Jakub Tomeček; Barbora Šumová	32	+4
4	Great Britain	Ben Llewellin; Amber Hill	32	+3
