= Spain at the 2019 European Games =

- Flag of Spain
- IOC code: ESP
- NOC: Spanish Olympic Committee
- Website: www.coe.es

in Minsk, Belarus 21–30 June 2019
- Competitors: 150 in 14 sports
- Flag bearers: Miguel Alvariño (opening); Sandra Sánchez (closing)
- Medals Ranked 12th: Gold 5 Silver 2 Bronze 6 Total 13

European Games appearances (overview)
- 2015; 2019; 2023; 2027

Spain competed at the 2019 European Games, in Minsk, Belarus from 21 to 30 June 2019. As of 28 May 2019, the Spanish Olympic Committee had selected 150 athletes to compete at the games.

== Medalists ==
| Medal | Name | Sport | Event | Date |
|---|---|---|---|---|
| Gold | Antonio Bailón; Fátima Gálvez | Shooting | Mixed team trap | 24 June |
| Gold | Gabriel Escobar | Boxing | Men's -52 kg | 29 June |
| Gold | Sandra Sánchez | Karate | Women's kata | 29 June |
| Gold | Damián Quintero | Karate | Men's kata | 29 June |
| Gold | Laura Palacios | Karate | Women's +68 kg | 29 June |
| Silver | Francisco Garrigos | Judo | Men's −60 kg | 22 June |
| Silver | Spain national beach soccer team | Beach soccer | Men's tournament | 29 June |
| Bronze | Julia Figueroa | Judo | Women's −48 kg | 22 June |
| Bronze | Fátima Gálvez | Shooting | Women's trap | 23 June |
| Bronze | Irene Díaz | Sambo | Women's −52 kg | 23 June |
| Bronze | Yaiza Jimenez | Sambo | Women's −60 kg | 23 June |
| Bronze | Alfonso Benavides | Canoe sprint | Men's C-1 200 m | 27 June |
| Bronze | Pablo Acha | Archery | Men's individual recurve | 27 June |

== Archery ==
Recurve

| Athlete | Event | Ranking round | | Round of 64 | Round of 32 | Round of 16 | Quarterfinals | Semifinals | Final / BM | |
| Athlete | Event | Score | Seed | Opposition Score | Opposition Score | Opposition Score | Opposition Score | Opposition Score | Opposition Score | Rank |
|---|---|---|---|---|---|---|---|---|---|---|
| Pablo Acha | Men's Individual | 675 | 6 Q | BYE | Liahusheu (BLR); W 6–0 | Huston (GBR); W 6–0 | Olaru (MDA); W 6–2 | Wijler (NED); L 3–7 | Pasqualucci (ITA); W 7–1 | 3rd place, bronze medalist(s) |
| Miguel Alvariño | Men's Individual | 674 | 7 Q | BYE | Banda (HUN); L 3–7 | did not advance | | | | |
| Daniel Castro | Men's Individual | 660 | 18 Q | Hurban (SVK); W 6–4 | Gstöttner (AUT); W 6–2 | Dalidovich (BLR); L 2–6 | did not advance | | | |
| Pablo Acha; Miguel Alvariño; Daniel Castro | Men's team | 2009 | 3 Q | —N/a | | | Russia (RUS); W 6–2 | Netherlands (NED); L 5–1 | Italy (ITA); L 2–6 | 4 |
| Alicia Marín | Women's Individual | 644 | 13 Q | BYE | Jager (DEN); L 4–6 | did not advance | | | | |
| Pablo Acha; Alicia Marín | Mixed team | 1319 | 6 Q | —N/a | BYE | Germany (GER); L 2–6 | did not advance | | | |

Compound

| Athlete | Event | Ranking round | | Round of 16 | Quarterfinals | Semifinals | Final / BM | |
| Athlete | Event | Score | Seed | Opposition Score | Opposition Score | Opposition Score | Opposition Score | Rank |
|---|---|---|---|---|---|---|---|---|
| Andrea Marcos | Women's Individual | 697 | 4 Q | Meißner (GER); L 143(10)-143(10*) | did not advance | | | |

== Athletics ==
Track events

| Athlete | Event | Heat | |
| Athlete | Event | Result | Rank |
|---|---|---|---|
| Ángel David Rodríguez | Men's 100 m | 10.78 | 16 |
| Estela García | Women's 100 m | 11.89 | 18 |
| Yidiel Contreras | Men's 110 m hurdles | 13.86 | 5 |
| Teresa Errandonea | Women's 100 m hurdles | 13.80 | 13 |
| Alberto Gavaldá; Bárbara Camblor; Carmen Sánchez; Gen San Millán | Mixed 4 × 400 m relay | 3:22.99 | 11 |
| Alejandro Estevez; Zoya Naumov; Mark Ujakpor; Cristina Lara | Mixed distance pursuit relay | 4:29.61 | 6 |

Field events

| Athlete | Event | Final | |
| Athlete | Event | Distance | Position |
|---|---|---|---|
| Alexis Sastre | Men's high jump | 2.10 | 12 |
| Fátima Diame | Women's long jump | 5.86 | 18 |
| Lidia Parada | Women's javelin throw | 52.17 | 14 |

== Badminton ==
| Athletes | Event | Group stage | | Round of 16 | Quarterfinals | Semifinals | Finals | Rank |
| Athletes | Event | Opposition Score | Rank | Opposition Score | Opposition Score | Opposition Score | Opposition Score | Rank |
|---|---|---|---|---|---|---|---|---|
| Pablo Abián | Men's singles | Wraber (AUT) W 2–0; Nguyen (IRL) W 2–1; Nikolov (BUL) W 2–1 | 1 Q | Burestedt (SWE); L 14–21, 21–11, 21–23 | did not advance | | | |
| Beatriz Corrales | Women's singles | Cherniavskaya (BLR) W 2–0; Pavlinić (CRO) L 1–2 de Visch Eijbergen (NED) w/o | WD | did not advance | | | | |
| Alberto Zapico; Lorena Uslé | Mixed doubles | Atrashchenkov / Zharka (UKR) W 2–0; Ellis / Smith (GBR) L 0–2; Nøhr / Thygesen (DEN) L 0–2 | 3 | —N/a | did not advance | | | |

== Basketball 3x3 ==
| Team | Event | Group stage | | | | Quarterfinals | Semifinals | Final / BM | |
| Team | Event | Opposition Score | Opposition Score | Opposition Score | Rank | Opposition Score | Opposition Score | Opposition Score | Rank |
|---|---|---|---|---|---|---|---|---|---|
| Marta Canella; Yurena Diaz; Nogaye Lo; Helena Oma | Women's tournament | Estonia; W 13–15 | Ukraine; L 17–15 | Latvia; W 22–6 | 2 Q | Germany; L 11–20 | did not advance | | |

== Beach soccer ==
Summary

| Team | Event | Group stage | | | | Semifinals / Pl | Final / BM / Pl | |
| Team | Event | Opposition Score | Opposition Score | Opposition Score | Rank | Opposition Score | Opposition Score | Rank |
|---|---|---|---|---|---|---|---|---|
| Spain | Men's tournament | Russia; W 5–4 | Ukraine; L 4–6 | Italy; W 6–5 | 1 Q | Switzerland; W 5–3 | Portugal; L 3–8 | 2nd place, silver medalist(s) |

== Boxing ==
Men

| Athlete | Event | Round of 64 | Round of 32 | Round of 16 | Quarterfinals | Semifinals | Final | |
| Athlete | Event | Opposition Result | Opposition Result | Opposition Result | Opposition Result | Opposition Result | Opposition Result | Rank |
|---|---|---|---|---|---|---|---|---|
| Martín Molina | 49 kg | —N/a | | Kurotchyn (UKR); W 5–0 | Daly (IRL); L 1–4 | did not advance | | |
| Gabriel Escobar | 52 kg | —N/a | BYE | Kudriakov (RUS); W 4–1 | Harutyunyan (ARM); W 5–0 | Cappai (ITA); W 4–1 | Asenov (BUL); W 4–1 | 1st place, gold medalist(s) |
| José Quiles | 56 kg | —N/a | BYE | Raman (GER); L 1–4 | did not advance | | | |
| Cristian Eusse | 60 kg | —N/a | Simsek (AUT); W 5–0 | Tonakanyan (ARM); L 0–5 | did not advance | | | |
| Johan Orozco | 64 kg | —N/a | Durkacz (POL); L 0–3 | did not advance | | | | |
| Miguel Cuadrado | 75 kg | BYE | Avdic (AUT); W 5–0 | Harcsa (HUN); W 3–2 | Csemez (SVK); L 1–4 | did not advance | | |
| Ayoub Ghadfa | +91 kg | —N/a | Veriasov (RUS); L 0–5 | did not advance | | | | |

Women

| Athlete | Event | Round of 16 | Quarterfinals | Semifinals | Final | |
| Athlete | Event | Opposition Result | Opposition Result | Opposition Result | Opposition Result | Rank |
|---|---|---|---|---|---|---|
| Patricia Martín | 75 kg | Sandakova (RUS); L 0–5 | did not advance | | | |

== Canoe sprint ==
Men

| Athlete | Event | Heats | | Semifinals | | Finals | |
| Athlete | Event | Time | Rank | Time | Rank | Time | Rank |
|---|---|---|---|---|---|---|---|
| Alfonso Benavides | C1 200 m | 39.969 | 3 QF | BYE | | 44.255 | 3rd place, bronze medalist(s) |
| David Barreiro | C1 1000 m | – | DQ | did not advance | | | |
| Noel Domínguez; David Fernández | C2 1000 m | 3:41.079 | 4 QS | 3:44.426 | 8 | did not advance | |
| Carlos Garrote | K1 200 m | 34.777 | 1 QF | BYE | | 39.839 | 8 |
| Roi Rodríguez | K1 1000 m | 3:29.790 | 1 QF | BYE | | 3:34.778 | 5 |
| Francisco Cubelos | K1 5000 m | —N/a | | | | 22:31.388 | 7 |
| Francisco Cubelos; Iñigo Peña | K2 1000 m | 3:10.070 | 2 QF | BYE | | 3:20.215 | 6 |
| Saul Craviotto; Rodrigo Germade; Cristian Toro; Marcus Walz | K4 500 m | 1:19.118 | 2 QF | BYE | | 1:40.216 | 9 |

Women

| Athlete | Event | Heats | | Semifinals | | Finals | |
| Athlete | Event | Time | Rank | Time | Rank | Time | Rank |
|---|---|---|---|---|---|---|---|
| Raquel Da Costa | C1 200 m | 51.124 | 6 QS | 54.282 | 7 | did not advance | |
| Raquel Da Costa; María Pérez | C2 500 m | 2:10.549 | 7 QS | 2:09.171 | 7 | did not advance | |
| Aída Bauza | K1 200 m | 43.382 | 6 QS | 42.674 | 7 FB | 47.966 | 18 |
| Laia Pélachs | K1 500 m | 1:52.465 | 4 QS | 1:54.811 | 7 FB | 2:10.315 | 14 |
| Eva Barrios | K1 5000 m | —N/a | | | | 26:07.516 | 9 |
| Aída Bauza; Carolina García | K2 200 m | – | DQ | did not advance | | | |
| Alicia Heredia; Carolina García | K2 500 m | 41.533 | 6 QS | 39.621 | 7 | did not advance | |
| Isabel Contreras; Natalia García; Begoña Lazcano; Sara Ouzande | K2 500 m | 1:32.979 | 5 QS | 1:34.030 | 2 FA | 1:49.624 | 9 |

== Cycling ==
=== Track ===
Sprint

| Athlete | Event | Qualification | | Round 1 | Repechage 1 | Round 2 | Repechage 2 | Round 3 | Repechage 3 | Quarterfinals | Semifinals | Final | |
| Athlete | Event | Time | Rank | Opposition | Opposition | Opposition | Opposition | Opposition | Opposition | Opposition | Opposition | Opposition | Rank |
|---|---|---|---|---|---|---|---|---|---|---|---|---|---|
| José Moreno | Men's sprint | 10.040 | 14 q | Čechman (CZE); L | Zaitsau (BLR); Omelchenko (AZE); L | did not advance | | | | | | | |
| Juan Peralta | Men's sprint | 10.045 | 15 q | Caleyron (FRA); L | Ceci (ITA); W | Rudyk (POL); L | Čechman (CZE); L | did not advance | | | | | |
| Tania Calvo | Women's sprint | 11.221 | 11 q | Kaňkovská (CZE); W | —N/a | van Riessen (NED); L | Vece (ITA); W | Braspennincx (NED); L | Claire (FRA); Marozaitė (LTU); L | did not advance | | | |
| Helena Casas | Women's sprint | 11.679 | 22 q | Voynova (RUS); L | Kaňkovská (CZE); Tołomanow (POL); L | did not advance | | | | | | | |

Team sprint

| Athlete | Event | Qualification | | Semifinals | | Final | |
| Athlete | Event | Time Speed (km/h) | Rank | Opposition Time Speed (km/h) | Rank | Opposition Time Speed (km/h) | Rank |
|---|---|---|---|---|---|---|---|
| Alejandro Martínez; José Moreno; Juan Peralta | Men's team sprint | 45.388 | 8 Q | Netherlands (NED); 44.896 | 8 | did not advance | |
| Tania Calvo; Helena Casas | Women's team sprint | 34.254 | 7 Q | Poland (POL); 34.294 | 7 | did not advance | |

Keirin

| Athlete | Event | 1st Round | Repechage | 2nd Round | Final |
| Athlete | Event | Rank | Rank | Rank | Rank |
|---|---|---|---|---|---|
| José Moreno | Men's keirin | 3 R | 2 | did not advance | |
| Juan Peralta | Men's keirin | 4 R | 1 Q | 2 Q | 6 |
| Tania Calvo | Women's keirin | 3 R | 2 | did not advance | |
| Helena Casas | Women's keirin | 3 R | 3 | did not advance | |

Time Trial

| Athlete | Event | 1st Round | | Final | |
| Athlete | Event | Time | Rank | Time | Rank |
|---|---|---|---|---|---|
| Alejandro Martínez | Men's time trial | 1:03.137 | 11 | did not advance | |
| José Moreno | Men's time trial | 1:02.014 | 9 | did not advance | |
| Tania Calvo | Women's time trial | 34.426 | 5 Q | 34.506 | 6 |
| Helena Casas | Women's time trial | 34.828 | 9 | did not advance | |

Omnium

| Athlete | Event | Scratch race | | Tempo race | | Elimination race | | Points race | | Total points | Rank |
| Athlete | Event | Rank | Points | Rank | Points | Rank | Points | Rank | Points | Total points | Rank |
|---|---|---|---|---|---|---|---|---|---|---|---|
| Illart Zuazubiskar | Men's omnium | 15 | 12 | 15 | 12 | 11 | 20 | 13 | 1 | 45 | 15 |
| Irene Usabiaga | Women's omnium | 13 | 16 | 15 | 12 | 9 | 24 | 14 | 0 | 52 | 14 |

Madison

| Athlete | Event | Points | Laps | Rank |
|---|---|---|---|---|
| Oscar Pelegrí; Illart Zuazubiskar | Men's madison | DNF | | |

Endurance

| Athlete | Event | Points Laps down | Rank |
|---|---|---|---|
| Oscar Pelegrí | Men's points race | 14 | 4 |
| Oscar Pelegrí | Men's scratch | – | 13 |
| Ana Usabiaga | Women's points race | 0 | 14 |
| Ana Usabiaga | Women's scratch | – | 6 |

== Gymnastics ==
=== Acrobatic ===
| Athlete | Event | Total | Rank |
|---|---|---|---|
| Silvia Coronado; Guillem Martínez | Mixed pairs all-around | 25.560 | 7 |
| Silvia Coronado; Guillem Martínez | Mixed pairs balance | 26.330 | 7 |
| Silvia Coronado; Guillem Martínez | Mixed pairs dynamic | 23.820 | 8 |

=== Aerobic ===
Mixed

| Athletes | Event | Final | |
| Athletes | Event | Points | Rank |
|---|---|---|---|
| Sergio Avellaneda; María Estefano; Pau Granell; Belén Guillemot; Anna Serra | Mixed groups | 20.433 | 5 |
| Pedro Cabañas; Belén Guillemot | Mixed pairs | 19.800 | 6 |

=== Artistic ===
Men
All-Around

| Athlete | Event | Qualification | | | | | | | | Final | | | | | | | |
| Athlete | Event | Apparatus | | | | | | Total | Rank | Apparatus | | | | | | Total | Rank |
| Athlete | Event | F | PH | R | V | PB | HB | Total | Rank | F | PH | R | V | PB | HB | Total | Rank |
|---|---|---|---|---|---|---|---|---|---|---|---|---|---|---|---|---|---|
| Néstor Abad | All-around | 14.200 | 12.900 | 13.800 | 13.933 | 14.066 | 13.800 | 82.699 | 4 Q | 14.400 | 12.033 | 13.800 | 13.966 | 14.066 | 14.266 | 82.531 | 6 |
| Nicolau Mir | All-around | 13.900 | 11.600 | 13.500 | 12.683 | 12.866 | 13.100 | 77.866 | 21 | did not advance | | | | | | | |
| Joel Plata | All-around | 14.166 | 12.733 | 13.133 | 13.700 | 13.533 | 12.333 | 79.598 | 15 Q | 13.733 | 13.100 | 12.966 | 13.933 | 14.000 | 12.866 | 80.598 | 12 |

Women
All-Around

| Athlete | Event | Qualification | | | | | | Final | | | | | |
| Athlete | Event | Apparatus | | | | Total | Rank | Apparatus | | | | Total | Rank |
| Athlete | Event | F | V | UB | BB | Total | Rank | F | V | UB | BB | Total | Rank |
|---|---|---|---|---|---|---|---|---|---|---|---|---|---|
| Cintia Rodríguez | All-around | 12.466 | 13.266 | 10.400 | 12.066 | 48.198 | 22 | did not advance | | | | | |

=== Rhythmic ===
| Athlete | Event | Final | | | |
| Athlete | Event | 5 balls | 3 hoops 4 clubs | Total | Rank |
|---|---|---|---|---|---|
| Victoria Cuadrillero; Clara Esquerdo; Ana Gayán; Alba Polo; Sara Salarrullana | All-round | 20.150 | 21.600 | 41.750 | 8 |
| Victoria Cuadrillero; Clara Esquerdo; Ana Gayán; Alba Polo; Sara Salarrullana | 5 balls | —N/a | | 20.150 | 8 |
| Victoria Cuadrillero; Clara Esquerdo; Ana Gayán; Alba Polo; Sara Salarrullana | 3 hoops, 4 clubs | —N/a | | 21.600 | 7 |

=== Trampoline ===
| Athlete | Event | Qualification | | Final | |
| Athlete | Event | Score | Rank | Score | Rank |
|---|---|---|---|---|---|
| Cristina Sainz | Women's individual | 61.345 | 20 | did not advance | |

== Judo ==
Men

| Athlete | Event | Round of 64 | Round of 32 | Round of 16 | Quarterfinals | Semifinals | Repechage | Final / BM | |
| Athlete | Event | Opposition Result | Opposition Result | Opposition Result | Opposition Result | Opposition Result | Opposition Result | Opposition Result | Rank |
|---|---|---|---|---|---|---|---|---|---|
| Francisco Garrigos | −60 kg | —N/a | BYE | Koffijberg (NED); W 10-01 | Verstraeten (BEL); W 10-00 | Plafky (GER); W 10-00 | —N/a | Chkhvimiani (GEO); L 00-01 | 2nd place, silver medalist(s) |
| Joaquín Gomis | −60 kg | —N/a | Ben David (ISR); L 00-01 | did not advance | | | | | |
| Alberto Gaitero | −66 kg | BYE | Wawrzyczek (POL); W 10-00 | Niniashvili (GEO); L 00-10 | did not advance | | | | |
| Daniel Pérez | −66 kg | BYE | Bunescu (MDA); L 00-01 | did not advance | | | | | |
| Jorge Cano García | −73 kg | Stump (SUI); W 10-00 | Butbul (ISR); L 00-10 | did not advance | | | | | |
| José María Mendiola | −81 kg | Vişan (ROU); W 10-00 | Chouchi (MDA); L 00-01 | did not advance | | | | | |
| Alfonso Urquiza | −81 kg | BYE | Gardašević (MNE); L 00-10 | did not advance | | | | | |
| Nikoloz Sherazadishvili | −90 kg | BYE | Nhabali (UKR); W 01-00 | Grossklaus (SUI); L 00-10 | did not advance | | | | |
| Irinel Chelaru | +100 kg | —N/a | Khammo (UKR); L 0–10 | did not advance | | | | | |

Women

| Athlete | Event | Round of 32 | Round of 16 | Quarterfinals | Semifinals | Repechage | Final / BM | |
| Athlete | Event | Opposition Result | Opposition Result | Opposition Result | Opposition Result | Opposition Result | Opposition Result | Rank |
|---|---|---|---|---|---|---|---|---|
| Julia Figueroa | −48 kg | BYE | Gurbanli (AZE); W 10-00 | Nikolić (SRB); L 01-00 | did not advance | Clement (FRA); W 01-00 | Costa (POR); W 01-00 | 3rd place, bronze medalist(s) |
| Laura Martínez | −48 kg | Cherniak (UKR); W 10-00 | Krasniqi (KOS); W WO | Costa (POR); L 01-00 | did not advance | Stangar (SLO); L 01-00 | did not advance | 7 |
| Estrella López | −52 kg | Perenc (POL); L 00-01 | did not advance | | | | | |
| Ana Pérez Box | −52 kg | BYE | Pieńkowska (POL); L 00-01 | did not advance | | | | |
| Jaione Equisoain | −57 kg | Kajzer (SLO); W 11-00 | Rogić (SRB); W 10-00 | Coban (GER); L 01-00 | did not advance | Verhagen (NED); L 01-00 | did not advance | 7 |
| Cristina Cabaña | −63 kg | Ludvik (SLO); L 00-10 | did not advance | | | | | |
| Isabel Puché | −63 kg | Centracchio (ITA); L 00-01 | did not advance | | | | | |
| María Bernabéu | −70 kg | Paissoni (ITA); L 00-10 | did not advance | | | | | |
| Sara Rodríguez | −70 kg | Fletcher (IRL); L 00-10 | did not advance | | | | | |

Mixed team

| Athlete | Event | Round of 16 | Quarterfinals | Semifinals | Repechage | Final / BM | |
| Athlete | Event | Opposition Result | Opposition Result | Opposition Result | Opposition Result | Opposition Result | Rank |
|---|---|---|---|---|---|---|---|
| Jaione Equisoain; Alberto Gaitero; Isabel Puché; Sara Rodríguez; Nikoloz Sherazadishvili; Alfonso Urquiza | Mixed team | Portugal (POR); L 2–4 | did not advance | | | | |

== Karate ==
| Athlete | Event | Group phase | | | | Semifinal | Final / BM | |
| Athlete | Event | Opposition Score | Opposition Score | Opposition Score | Rank | Opposition Score | Opposition Score | Rank |
|---|---|---|---|---|---|---|---|---|
| Damián Quintero | Men's Kata | | | | | | | 1st place, gold medalist(s) |
| Cristina Ferrer | Women's −61 kg | Çoban (TUR); D 0-0 | Ristić (SLO); D 1–1 | Dzyachkova (BLR); 0–0 | 3 NQ | did not advance | | 5 |
| Laura Palacios | Women's +68 kg | Martynouskaya (BLR); W 3–2 | Garcia (FRA); W 2–1 | Hocaoğlu (TUR); 0–0 | 2 Q | Chatziliadou (GRE); W 3-2 | Hocaoğlu (TUR); W 3-1 | 1st place, gold medalist(s) |
| Sandra Sánchez | Women's Kata | | | | | | | 1st place, gold medalist(s) |

== Sambo ==
Men

| Athlete | Event | Quarterfinals | Semifinals | Repechage | Final / BM | |
| Athlete | Event | Opposition Result | Opposition Result | Opposition Result | Opposition Result | Rank |
|---|---|---|---|---|---|---|
| David Fernández | +100 kg | Rybak (BLR); L 0–8 | did not advance | Papadopoulos (CYP); W 5–0 | Gajic (SRB); L 0–6 | 5 |

Women

| Athlete | Event | Quarterfinals | Semifinals | Repechage | Final / BM | |
| Athlete | Event | Opposition Result | Opposition Result | Opposition Result | Opposition Result | Rank |
|---|---|---|---|---|---|---|
| Irene Díaz | −52 kg | Revilakova (SVK); W 8–0 | Zharskaya (BLR); L 1–1 | —N/a | Kovacs (ROU); W 9–0 | 3rd place, bronze medalist(s) |
| Yaiza Jiménez | −60 kg | Shevchenko (UKR); W 1–0 | Artemciuc (MDA); L 0–1 | —N/a | Ionescu (ROU); W 1–1 | 3rd place, bronze medalist(s) |
| María Cabas | −64 kg | Sayko (UKR); L 0–1 | did not advance | Horn (GER); W 8–0 | Valvoi (ROU); L VH | 5 |

== Shooting ==
Men

| Athlete | Event | Qualification | | Final | |
| Athlete | Event | Points | Rank | Points | Rank |
|---|---|---|---|---|---|
| Pablo Carrera | 10 m air pistol | 579 | 6 Q | 157.5 | 6 |
| Juan José Aramburu | Skeet | 121 (+5) | 7 | did not advance | |
| Antonio Bailón | Trap | 112 | 18 | did not advance | |
| Alberto Fernández | Trap | 113 | 16 | did not advance | |

Women

| Athlete | Event | Qualification | | Final | |
| Athlete | Event | Points | Rank | Points | Rank |
|---|---|---|---|---|---|
| Sonia Franquet | 10 m air pistol | 564 | 25 | did not advance | |
| Sonia Franquet | 25 m pistol | 569 | 26 | did not advance | |
| Fátima Gálvez | Trap | 114 | 1 Q | 34 | 3rd place, bronze medalist(s) |
| Beatriz Martínez | Trap | 101 | 19 | did not advance | |

Mixed

| Athlete | Event | Qualification | | Final | |
| Athlete | Event | Points | Rank | Points | Rank |
|---|---|---|---|---|---|
| Antonio Bailón; Fátima Gálvez | Team trap | 143 | 1 Q | 44 | 1st place, gold medalist(s) |
| Alberto Fernández; Beatriz Martínez | Team trap | 129 | 9 | did not advance | |

== Table tennis ==
| Athlete | Event | Round 1 | Round 2 | Round 3 | Round 4 | Quarterfinals | Semifinals | Final / BM | |
| Athlete | Event | Opposition Score | Opposition Score | Opposition Score | Opposition Score | Opposition Score | Opposition Score | Opposition Score | Rank |
|---|---|---|---|---|---|---|---|---|---|
| Jesús Cantero | Men's singles | BYE | Gardos (AUT); L 4–2 | did not advance | | | | | |
| Álvaro Robles | Men's singles | BYE | | Lei (UKR); L 1–4 | did not advance | | | | |
| Galia Dvorak | Women's singles | BYE | Noskova (RUS); L 1–4 | did not advance | | | | | |
| María Xiao | Women's singles | BYE | Paulovich (BLR); L 2–4 | did not advance | | | | | |
| Galia Dvorak; María Xiao; Sofía-Xuan Zhang | Women's team | —N/a | | | Sweden (SWE); L 1–3 | did not advance | | | |
| Galia Dvorak; Álvaro Robles | Mixed doubles | —N/a | | | Karakašević / Lupulesku (SRB); W 3–2 | Pistej / Balážová (SVK); L 0–3 | did not advance | | |

== Wrestling ==
Men's freestyle

| Athlete | Event | Round of 16 | Quarterfinal | Semifinal | Repechage 1 | Repechage 2 | Final / BM | |
| Athlete | Event | Opposition Result | Opposition Result | Opposition Result | Opposition Result | Opposition Result | Opposition Result | Rank |
|---|---|---|---|---|---|---|---|---|
| Levan Metreveli | 57 kg | Atlı (TUR); L 0–10 | did not advance | | | | | |
| Taimuraz Friev | 86 kg | Palaghia (ROU); W 10–0 | Dudarov (GER); L 2–8 | did not advance | | | | |

Women's freestyle

| Athlete | Event | Round of 16 | Quarterfinal | Semifinal | Repechage | Final / BM | |
| Athlete | Event | Opposition Result | Opposition Result | Opposition Result | Opposition Result | Opposition Result | Rank |
|---|---|---|---|---|---|---|---|
| Marina Rueda | 53 kg | Khalvadzhy (UKR); L 0–10 | did not advance | | Dénes (HUN); L 0–10 | did not advance | |
| Victoria Báez-Dilone | 57 kg | Lindborg (SWE); L 0–6 | did not advance | | | | |
| Lydia Pérez | 62 kg | Tkach (UKR); L 0–6 | did not advance | | Kuznetsova (RUS); L 10–3 | did not advance | |
