= Great Britain at the 2019 European Games =

- IOC code: GBR
- NOC: British Olympic Association
- Website: www.teamgb.com

in Minsk, Belarus 21 – 30 June 2019
- Competitors: 101 in 10 sports
- Flag bearer: Sally Conway (Opening) Marcus Ellis (Closing)
- Medals Ranked 9th: Gold 6 Silver 9 Bronze 8 Total 23

European Games appearances (overview)
- 2015; 2019; 2023; 2027

Great Britain competed at the 2019 European Games, in Minsk, Belarus from 21 to 30 June 2019. It won 6 gold medals, 9 silver medals and 8 bronze medals, totalling 23 medals and placing 9th on the medals table. When it had previously competed at the 2015 European Games in Baku, Azerbaijan, it won 47 medals, including 18 golds.

== Before the Games ==
Team GB announced the athletes selected to represent Great Britain on the 21 May 2019 adding the selection of archers on the 24 May. With swimming (Great Britain's most successful sport in 2015) being removed from the Games program and the decision not to take part in the athletics competition, the team chosen was significantly smaller than that which made the journey to Baku in 2015.

== Medalists ==
Medal	Name	Sport	Event	Date
Gold	Sarah Bettles; Naomi Folkard; Bryony Pitman	Archery	Women's team recurve	22 June
Gold	Marcus Ellis; Chris Langridge	Badminton	Men's doubles	29 June
Gold	Pat McCormack	Boxing	Men's 69 kg	29 June
Gold	Marcus Ellis; Lauren Smith	Badminton	Mixed doubles	30 June
Gold	Lauren Price	Boxing	Women's 69 kg	30 June
Gold	Megan Barker; Jessica Roberts	Cycling	Women's madison	30 June
Silver	Naomi Folkard; Patrick Huston	Archery	Mixed team recurve	23 June
Silver	Alice Schlesinger	Judo	Women's −63 kg	23 June
Silver	Megan Barker; Jennifer Holl; Josie Knight; Jessica Roberts	Cycling	Women's team pursuit	28 June
Silver	Chloe Birch; Lauren Smith	Badminton	Women's doubles	29 June
Silver	Ben Whittaker	Boxing	Men's 81 kg	29 June
Silver	Kirsty Gilmour	Badminton	Women's singles	30 June
Silver	Chris Adcock; Gabby Adcock	Badminton	Mixed doubles	30 June
Silver	Giarnni Regini-Moran	Gymnastics	Men's floor	30 June
Silver	Rebecca Downie	Gymnastics	Women's uneven bars	30 June
Bronze	Chelsie Giles	Judo	Women's −52 kg	22 June
Bronze	Aaron Heading	Shooting	Men's trap	23 June
Bronze	Hayley Simmonds	Cycling	Women's time trial	25 June
Bronze	Jack Carlin; Jason Kenny; Ryan Owens	Cycling	Men's team sprint	27 June
Bronze	Galal Yafai	Boxing	Men's 52 kg	28 June
Bronze	Peter McGrail	Boxing	Men's 56 kg	28 June
Bronze	Luke McCormack	Boxing	Men's 64 kg	28 June
Bronze	Cheavon Clarke	Boxing	Men's 91 kg	28 June

Medals by sport
Sport	1st place, gold medalist(s)	2nd place, silver medalist(s)	3rd place, bronze medalist(s)	Total
Badminton	2	3	0	5
Boxing	2	1	4	7
Cycling	1	1	2	4
Archery	1	1	0	2
Gymnastics	0	2	0	2
Judo	0	1	1	2
Shooting	0	0	1	1
Total	6	9	8	23

Medals by date
Day	Date	1st place, gold medalist(s)	2nd place, silver medalist(s)	3rd place, bronze medalist(s)	Total
1	22 June	1	0	1	2
2	23 June	0	2	1	3
3	24 June	0	0	0	0
4	25 June	0	0	1	1
5	26 June	0	0	0	0
6	27 June	0	0	1	1
7	28 June	0	1	4	5
8	29 June	2	2	0	4
9	30 June	3	4	0	7
Total		6	9	8	23

Multiple medalists
Name	Sport	1st place, gold medalist(s)	2nd place, silver medalist(s)	3rd place, bronze medalist(s)	Total
Marcus Ellis	Badminton	2	0	0	2
Naomi Folkard	Archery	1	1	0	2
Megan Barker	Cycling	1	1	0	2
Jessica Roberts	Cycling	1	1	0	2
Lauren Smith	Badminton	1	1	0	2

== Archery ==
Men

Athlete	Event	Ranking round		Round of 64	Round of 32	Round of 16	Quarterfinal	Semifinal	Final / BM	
Athlete	Event	Score	Seed	Opposition Score	Opposition Score	Opposition Score	Opposition Score	Opposition Score	Opposition Score	Rank
Tom Hall	Individual recurve	661	17	Hoxha (ALB); W 6–0	Faber (SUI); L 4–6	Did not advance				
Patrick Huston	Individual recurve	666	11	Bye	Forlani (SMR); W 6–2	Acha (ESP); L 0–6	Did not advance			
Alexander Wise	Individual recurve	648	24	Pasqualucci (ITA); L 5–6 (SO)	Did not advance					
Adam Ravenscroft	Individual compound	696	8	—N/a		Ban (BLR); W 144–140	Nedeljkovic (SRB); W 144–139	Seywert (LUX); L 138–140	Bronze medal final Varvo (CRO); L 139–145	4
Tom Hall; Patrick Huston; Alexander Wise	Team recurve	1975	4	—N/a			Italy (ITA); L 1–5	Did not advance		5

Women

Athlete	Event	Ranking round		Round of 64	Round of 32	Round of 16	Quarterfinal	Semifinal	Final / BM	
Athlete	Event	Score	Seed	Opposition Result	Opposition Result	Opposition Result	Opposition Result	Opposition Result	Opposition Result	Rank
Sarah Bettles	Individual recurve	640	16	Bye	Pitman (GBR); W 6–4	Bayardo (NED); L 2–6	Did not advance			
Naomi Folkard	Individual recurve	642	14	Bye	Landi (ITA); W 7–3	Kazlouskaya (BLR); L 2–6	Did not advance			
Bryony Pitman	Individual recurve	640	17	Zejnullahu (KOS); W 6–0	Bettles (GBR); L 4–6	Did not advance				
Lucy Torrin Mason	Individual compound	681	12	—N/a		Bostan (TUR); L 140(9)–140(10)	Did not advance			9
Sarah Bettles; Naomi Folkard; Bryony Pitman	Team recurve	1922	4	—N/a			Turkey (TUR); W 6–0	Denmark (DEN); W 6–0	Belarus (BLR); W 6–2	1st place, gold medalist(s)

Mixed

Athlete	Event	Ranking round		Round of 32	Round of 16	Quarterfinal	Semifinal	Final / BM	
Athlete	Event	Score	Seed	Opposition Result	Opposition Result	Opposition Result	Opposition Result	Opposition Result	Rank
Naomi Folkard; Patrick Huston	Team recurve	1308	7	Bye	Ukraine (UKR); W 5–3	France (FRA); W 6–0	Germany (GER); W 5–4	Italy (ITA); L 1–5	2nd place, silver medalist(s)
Lucy Torrin Mason; Adam Ravenscroft	Team compound	1377	7	—N/a	Bye	Netherlands (NED); L 147–155	Did not advance		

== Badminton ==
Athlete	Event	Group stage				Round of 16	Quarterfinal	Semifinal	Final	
Athlete	Event	Opposition Score	Opposition Score	Opposition Score	Rank	Opposition Score	Opposition Score	Opposition Score	Opposition Score	Rank
Toby Penty	Men's singles	Ludík (CZE); W 2–0	Pochtarov (UKR); W 2–0	Burestedt (SWE); W 2–0	1 Q	Nguyen (IRL); W 2–0	Antonsen (DEN); L 0–2	Did not advance		
Marcus Ellis; Chris Langridge	Men's doubles	Magee / Reynolds (IRL); W 2–0	Kaljurand / Käsner (EST); W 2–0	Gicquel / Labar (FRA); W 2–0	1 Q	—N/a	Kaisti / Larkimo (FIN); W 2–0	Maas / Tabeling (NED); W 2–0	Astrup / Rasmussen (DEN); W 2–0	1st place, gold medalist(s)
Chloe Birch	Women's singles	Jaquet (SUI); W 2–1	Gonçalves (POR); W 2–0	Salehar (SLO); W 2–0	1 Q	Batomene (FRA); W 2–0	Blichfeldt (DEN); L 0–2	Did not advance		
Kirsty Gilmour	Women's singles	Wiborg (NOR); W 2–0	Fomkinaitė (LTU); W 2–0	Batomene (FRA); W 2–0	1 Q	Tan (BEL); W 2–0	Jaquet (SUI); W 2–1	Kjærsfeldt (DEN); W 2–1	Blichfeldt (DEN); L 0–2	2nd place, silver medalist(s)
Chloe Birch; Lauren Smith	Women's doubles	Fruergaard / Thygesen (DEN); W 2–0	Bukoviczki / Gonda (HUN); W 2–0	Fomkinaitė / Voitechovskaja (LTU); W 2–0	1 Q	—N/a	Erçetin / İnci (TUR); W 2–0	Lefel / Tran (FRA); W 2–0	Piek / Seinen (NED); L 1–2	2nd place, silver medalist(s)
Chris Adcock; Gabby Adcock	Mixed doubles	Schaller / Burkart (SUI); W 2–0	Vlaar / Mitsova (BUL); W 2–0	Bitman / Bášová (CZE); W 2–0	1 Q	—N/a	Nøhr / Thygesen (DEN); W 2–1	Magee / Magee (IRL); W 2–0	Ellis / Smith (GBR); L 0–2	2nd place, silver medalist(s)
Marcus Ellis; Lauren Smith	Mixed doubles	Nøhr / Thygesen (DEN); W 2–0	Zapico / Uslé (ESP); W 2–0	Atrashchenkov / Zharka (UKR); W 2–0	1 Q	—N/a	Lamsfuß / Herttrich (GER); W 2–0	Gicquel / Delrue (FRA); W 2–0	Adcock / Adcock (GBR); W 2–0	1st place, gold medalist(s)

== Boxing ==
Men

Athlete	Event	Round of 32	Round of 16	Quarterfinal	Semifinal	Final	
Athlete	Event	Opposition Result	Opposition Result	Opposition Result	Opposition Result	Opposition Result	Rank
Aqeel Ahmed	49 kg	—N/a	Slominski (POL); W 5–0	Alakhverdovi (GEO); L 2–3	Did not advance		
Galal Yafai	52 kg	Bye	Virban (HUN); W 5–0	Zamotayev (UKR); W 5–0	Asenov (BUL); L 2–3	Did not advance	3rd place, bronze medalist(s)
Peter McGrail	56 kg	Bye	Usturoi (BEL); W 5–0	Zeneli (ALB); W 5–0	Walker (IRL); L 2–3	Did not advance	3rd place, bronze medalist(s)
Calum French	60 kg	Bye	Maietta (ITA); W 4–1	Tonakanyan (ARM); L 2–3	Did not advance		
Luke McCormack	64 kg	Bye	Fodor (HUN); W 3–2	Khartsyz (UKR); W 3–1	Oumiha (FRA); L 0–5	Did not advance	3rd place, bronze medalist(s)
Pat McCormack	69 kg	Kozák (HUN); W 5–0	Kamanin (EST); W 5–0	Micallef (MON); W 5–0	Sotomayor (AZE); W RSC	Agrba (RUS); W 5-0	1st place, gold medalist(s)
Mark Dickinson	75 kg	Nevin (IRL); L 2–3	Did not advance				
Benjamin Whittaker	81 kg	Goiński (POL); W 5–0	Dzambekov (AUT); W 5–0	Abu-Lubdeh (GER); W 4–1	Nersesyan (ARM); W 5–0	Alphonso (AZE); L 2-3	2nd place, silver medalist(s)
Cheavon Clarke	91 kg	Bye	Karlson (EST); W 5–0	Acer (TUR); W 5–0	Smiahlikau (BLR); L 1–4	Did not advance	3rd place, bronze medalist(s)
Frazer Clarke	+91 kg	Bye	Tiafack (GER); L 2–3	Did not advance			

Women

Athlete	Event	Round of 16	Quarterfinal	Semifinal	Final	
Athlete	Event	Opposition Result	Opposition Result	Opposition Result	Opposition Result	Rank
Rosie Eccles	69 kg	Walsh (IRL); L 1–4	Did not advance			
Lauren Price	75 kg	Bye	O'Rourke (IRL); W 5–0	Sandakova (RUS); W 5–0	Fontijn (NED); W 4-1	1st place, gold medalist(s)

== Canoe sprint ==
Athlete	Event	Heats		Semifinal		Final	
Athlete	Event	Time	Rank	Time	Rank	Time	Rank
Thomas Lusty	Men's K-1 1000 m	3:32.643	4 SF	3:27.531	3 FA	3:36.868	8
Afton Fitzhenry	Women's C-1 200 m	51.818	7 SF	53.312	6	Did not advance	
Chloe Bracewell; Katie Reid	Women's C-2 500 m	2:01.988	4 SF	2:01.939	2 FA	2:27.344	9

Qualification legend: SF – Qualify to semifinal; FA – Qualify to medal final; FB – Qualify to non-medal final

== Cycling ==
=== Road ===
Men

Athlete	Event	Time	Rank
Scott Thwaites	Road race	4:10:45	7
Gabriel Cullaigh	Road race	4:10:58	22
Ethan Vernon	Road race	4:10:58	28
Jim Brown	Road race	4:12:27	79
Charley Calvert	Road race	4:16:43	96

Women

Athlete	Event	Time	Rank
Alice Barnes	Road race	3:08:13	4
Rhona Callandar	Road race	3:09:36	61
Anna Henderson	Road race	3:08:13	16
Nicola Juniper	Road race	3:08:43	51
Hayley Simmonds	Road race	3:09:36	60
Alice Barnes	Time trial	37:45.38	4
Hayley Simmonds	Time trial	37:44.57	3rd place, bronze medalist(s)

=== Track ===
Pursuit

Athlete	Event	Qualification		Semifinal	Final / BM	
Athlete	Event	Time	Rank	Opposition Result	Opposition Result	Rank
Megan Barker; Jennifer Holl; Josie Knight; Jessica Roberts	Women's team	4:22.865	2 Q	Poland (POL); W 4:21.023	Italy (ITA); L 4:21.173	2nd place, silver medalist(s)

Individual sprint

athlete	Event	Qualification		Round of 64	Repechage 1	Round of 32	Repechage 2	Round of 16	Repechage 3	Quarterfinal	Semifinal	Final / BM	
athlete	Event	Time	Rank	Opposition Result	Opposition Result	Opposition Result	Opposition Result	Opposition Result	Opposition Result	Opposition Result	Opposition Result	Opposition Result	Rank
Jack Carlin	Men's	9.933	12 q	Szalontay (HUN); W -0.099	Bye	Lendel (LTU); W -0.694	Bye	Kenny (GBR); W -0.056	Bye	Dmitriev (RUS); L +0.030, L +0.021	Did not advance		
Jason Kenny	Men's	9.837	8 q	Boscaro (ITA); W -0.096	Bye	Sarneki (POL); W -0.062	Bye	Carlin (GBR); L +0.056	Lendel (LTU), Sarnecki (POL); 2	Did not advance			
Sophie Caldwell	Women's	11.221	12 q	Degrendele (BEL); L +0.175	Fidanza (ITA), Miadzvetskaya (BLR); 1 Q	Gros (FRA); L +0.203	Marchant (GBR); L +0.001	Did not advance					
Katy Marchant	Women's	11.078	9 q	Sibiak (POL); W -0.028	Bye	Krupeckaitė (LTU); L +0.060	Caldwell (GBR); W -0.001	Shmeleva (RUS); L +0.148	Degrendele (BEL), Starikova (UKR); 2	Did not advance			

Team sprint

Athlete	Event	Qualification		First round		Final / BM	
Athlete	Event	Time	Rank	Opposition Result	Rank	Opposition Result	Rank
Jack Carlin; Jason Kenny; Ryan Owens	Men's	43.517	2 Q	Poland; W 43.456	3 QB	Bronze medal final Czech Republic; W 43.020	3rd place, bronze medalist(s)

Keirin

Athlete	Event	1st round	Repechage	2nd round	Final
Joe Truman	Men's	1 Q	Bye	4 FB	10
Jason Kenny	Men's	4 R	1 Q	4 FB	7
Sophie Caldwell	Women's	4 R	4	Did not advance	
Katy Marchant	Women's	3 R	1 Q	4 FB	9

Qualification legend: Q – Qualify to second round; R – Qualify to repechage; FA – Qualify to medal final; FB Qualify to non-medal final

Bunch races

Athlete	Event	Points	Rank
Anna Docherty	Women's points race	4	12
Jessica Roberts; Megan Barker	Women's madison	44	1st place, gold medalist(s)
Jennifer Holl	Women's scratch race	—N/a	13

Omnium

Athlete	Event	Scratch Race		Tempo		Elimination		Points Race		Total	Rank
Athlete	Event	Rank	Points	Rank	Points	Rank	Points	Rank	Points	Total	Rank
Jessica Roberts	Women's	2	38	3	36	3	36	—N/a	9	119	4

== Gymnastics ==
=== Acrobatic ===
Athlete	Event	Score	Rank
Erin Henderson; Sacha Muir; Chloe Rowlans	Women's group all-around	28.200	6
Erin Henderson; Sacha Muir; Chloe Rowlans	Women's group balance	25.860	8
Erin Henderson; Sacha Muir; Chloe Rowlans	Women's group dynamic	27.680	6

=== Aerobic ===
Athlete	Event	Score	Rank
Renee Augier; Kate Donnelly; Niamh Keane; Isidora Vucicevic; Rhys Williams	Mixed group	19.416	7

=== Artistic ===
Men

Athlete	Event	Qualification								Final							
Athlete	Event	Apparatus						Total	Rank	Apparatus						Total	Rank
Athlete	Event	F	PH	R	V	PB	HB	Total	Rank	F	PH	R	V	PB	HB	Total	Rank
Brinn Bevan	All-around	—N/a	13.733	—N/a		14.866	12.800	—N/a		Did not advance							
Jake Jarman	All-around	12.766	13.233	12.533	14.366	12.166	12.633	77.697	22	Did not advance							
Giarnni Regini-Moran	All-around	14.233	12.400	13.033	14.800	13.733	13.333	81.532	9 Q	14.700	11.366	12.733	14.700	14.166	13.333	80.264	13
Giarnni Regini-Moran	Floor	14.233	—N/a					14.233	7 Q	14.333	—N/a					14.333	2nd place, silver medalist(s)
Brinn Bevan	Parallel bars	—N/a				14.866	—N/a	14.866	4 Q	—N/a				DNS	—N/a	DNS	
Giarnni Regini-Moran	Vault	—N/a		14.650	—N/a			14.650	4 Q	—N/a		14.066	—N/a			5	

Women

Athlete	Event	Qualification						Final					
Athlete	Event	Apparatus				Total	Rank	Apparatus				Total	Rank
Athlete	Event	F	UB	BB	V	Total	Rank	F	UB	BB	V	Total	Rank
Becky Downie	All-around	—N/a	14.433	11.666	—N/a	—N/a		Did not advance					
Georgia-Mae Fenton	All-around	12.733	14.100	12.900	14.000	53.733	2 Q	12.566	13.800	11.700	13.000	51.066	8
Becky Downie	Uneven bars	—N/a	14.433	—N/a		14.433	1 Q	—N/a	14.400	—N/a		14.400	2nd place, silver medalist(s)
Georgia-Mae Fenton	Balance beam	—N/a		12.900	—N/a	12.900	6 Q	—N/a		12.800	—N/a	12.800	5

=== Trampoline ===
Athlete	Event	Qualification		Final	
Athlete	Event	Score	Rank	Score	Rank
Corey Walkes	Men's individual	107.050	10 R	Did not advance	
Isabelle Songhurst	Women's individual	96.870	11	Did not advance	

== Judo ==
Men

Athlete	Event	Round of 32	Round of 16	Quarterfinal	Semifinal	Repechage	Final / BM	
Athlete	Event	Opposition Result	Opposition Result	Opposition Result	Opposition Result	Opposition Result	Opposition Result	Rank
Ashley McKenzie	60 kg	Bye	Mkheidze (FRA); L 0s2 – 10s3	Did not advance				
Stuart McWatt	81 kg	Cercea (ROU); W 11 – 1s1	Albayrak (TUR); W 10s1 – 0	Maisuradze (GEO); L 0s2 – 10	Did not advance	Wieczerzak (GER); L 1 – 11s1	Did not advance	
Frazer Chamberlain	90 kg	Kliavusau (BLR); W 10s1 – 0s1	Majdov (SRB); W 111s1 – 0	van't End (NED); L 0 – 10	Did not advance	Randt (SVK); W 10s2 – 1s3	Bronze medal final Khalmurzaev (RUS); L 0s1 – 10s1	5
Max Stewart	90 kg	Diesse (FRA); L 0s1 – 1	Did not advance					

Women

Athlete	Event	Round of 32	Round of 16	Quarterfinal	Semifinal	Repechage	Final / BM	
Athlete	Event	Opposition Result	Opposition Result	Opposition Result	Opposition Result	Opposition Result	Opposition Result	Rank
Chelsie Giles	52 kg	Ramos (POR); W 1s1 – 0s1	Gneto (FRA); W 10s2 – 1s3	Buchard (FRA); L 0 – 1s1	Did not advance	Pienkowska (POL); W 10s1 – 0s1	Bronze medal final Perenc (POL); W 10 – 1s1	3rd place, bronze medalist(s)
Nekoda Smythe-Davis	57 kg	Withdrawn						
Lucy Renshall	63 kg	Talach (POL); L 0s1 – 10	Did not advance					
Alice Schlesinger	63 kg	Hrebenozhko (UKR); W 10 – 0s2	Krssakova (AUT); W 10s1 – 0s1	Trajdos (GER); W 10s2 – 1s1	Centracchio (ITA); W 10s2 – 0h	Bye	Agbegnenou (FRA); L 0 – 11	2nd place, silver medalist(s)
Sally Conway	70 kg	Bye	Fletcher (IRL); L 0s1 – 1	Did not advance				
Gemma Howell	70 kg	Azipovich (BLR); W 11 – 0	Pinot (FRA); L 0s1 – 10s1	Did not advance				
Natalie Powell	78 kg	Bye	Shmeleva (RUS); W 10s1 – 0s3	Apotekar (SLO); L 0s2 – 11s2	Did not advance	Malonga (FRA); L 0–10	Did not advance	
Katie Jemima Yeats-Brown	78 kg	Bye	Kuka (KOS); L 0s2 – 1	Did not advance				
Sarah Adlington	+78 kg	Bye	Karpati (HUN); W 1s2 – 0s2	Kindzerska (AZE); L 0 – 11	Did not advance	Chibisova (RUS); L 0s1 – 10	Did not advance	

== Karate ==
Kumite
Men

Athlete	Event	Group stage				Semifinal	Final	
Athlete	Event	Opposition Score	Opposition Score	Opposition Score	Rank	Opposition Score	Opposition Score	Rank
Joe Kellaway	−75 kg	Aghayev (AZE); L 2-3	Harspakati (HUN); L 0-1	Eltemur (TUR); L 1-3	4	Did not advance		

== Shooting ==
Shotgun

Men

Athlete	Event	Qualification		Final	
Athlete	Event	Points	Rank	Points	Rank
Matthew Coward-Holley	Trap	109	24	Did not advance	
Aaron Heading	Trap	118	6 Q	35 (40)	3rd place, bronze medalist(s)
Jeremy Bird	Skeet	114	21	Did not advance	
Ben Llewellin	Skeet	122	3 Q	26 (30)	5

Women

Athlete	Event	Qualification		Final	
Athlete	Event	Points	Rank	Points	Rank
Kirsty Barr	Trap	101	17	Did not advance	
Abbey Ling	Trap	103	10	Did not advance	
Elena Allen	Skeet	103	27	Did not advance	
Amber Hill	Skeet	112	11	Did not advance	

Mixed

Athlete	Event	Qualification		Final / BM	
Athlete	Event	Points	Rank	Points	Rank
Matthew Coward-Holley; Kirsty Barr	Team trap	123	20	Did not advance	
Aaron Heading; Abbey Ling	Team trap	130	6	Did not advance	
Elena Allen; Jeremy Bird	Team skeet	131	15	Did not advance	
Ben Llewellin; Amber Hill	Team skeet	143	3 QB	Bronze medal final 33 (+3 SO)	4

== Table Tennis ==
Great Britain secured four quotas for the singles events and a position in the men's team event.

Athlete	Event	Round 1	Round 2	Round 3	Round 4	Quarterfinal	Semifinal	Final / BM	
Athlete	Event	Opposition Result	Opposition Result	Opposition Result	Opposition Result	Opposition Result	Opposition Result	Opposition Result	Rank
Liam Pitchford	Men's singles	Bye		Gionis (GRE); L 1–4	Did not advance				
Sam Walker	Men's singles	Bye	Platonov (BLR); W 4–3	Groth (DEN); L 3–4	Did not advance				
Paul Drinkhall; Liam Pitchford; Sam Walker	Men's team	Bye	—N/a			Portugal (POR); L 1–3	Did not advance		
Charlotte Carey	Women's singles	Bye	Solja (AUT); L 0–4	Did not advance					
Tin-Tin Ho	Women's singles	Kirichenko (FIN); W 4–0	Yang (MON); L 0–4	Did not advance					

== Wrestling ==
Women's freestyle

Athlete	Event	Round of 16	Quarterfinals	Semifinals	Repechage	Final / BM	
Athlete	Event	Opposition Result	Opposition Result	Opposition Result	Opposition Result	Opposition Result	Rank
Georgina Nelthorpe	−76 kg	Osocka (POL); W 2-5^{VBF}	Aliyeva (AZE); L 2-8^{VPO}	Did not advance			
