= Karate at the 2019 European Games – Women's individual kata =

Martial art competition

Women's individual kata at the 2019 European Games
- Venue: Čyžoŭka-Arena
- Date: 29 June
- Competitors: 8 from 8 nations

Medalists
gold medal	Sandra Sánchez	Spain
silver medal	Viviana Bottaro	Italy
bronze medal	Patrícia Esparteiro	Portugal
bronze medal	Dilara Bozan	Turkey

The women's individual kata competition at the 2019 European Games in Minsk was held on 29 June 2019 at the Čyžoŭka-Arena.

== Schedule ==
All times are local (UTC+3).

Date	Time	Event
Saturday, 29 June 2019	09:00	Elimination round
Saturday, 29 June 2019	10:20	Ranking round
Saturday, 29 June 2019	15:30	Bronze medal match
Saturday, 29 June 2019	17:25	Gold medal match

== Results ==
=== Elimination round ===
==== Group A ====
Rank	Athlete	Technic	Total	Factor	Result	Total kata	Average total	Notes
1	Sandra Sánchez (ESP)	Kururunfa	27.4	0.7	19.18	27.22	27.44	Q
1	Sandra Sánchez (ESP)	Kururunfa	26.8	0.3	8.04	27.22	27.44	Q
1	Sandra Sánchez (ESP)	Anan Dai	27.6	0.7	19.32	27.66	27.44	Q
1	Sandra Sánchez (ESP)	Anan Dai	27.8	0.3	8.34	27.66	27.44	Q
2	Patrícia Esparteiro (POR)	Anan Dai	25.0	0.7	17.50	25.00	24.79	Q
2	Patrícia Esparteiro (POR)	Anan Dai	25.0	0.3	7.50	25.00	24.79	Q
2	Patrícia Esparteiro (POR)	Chatanyara; Kushanku	24.4	0.7	17.08	24.58	24.79	Q
2	Patrícia Esparteiro (POR)	Chatanyara; Kushanku	25.0	0.3	7.50	24.58	24.79	Q
3	Alexandra Feracci (FRA)	Anan	24.6	0.7	17.22	24.54	24.60	Q
3	Alexandra Feracci (FRA)	Anan	24.4	0.3	7.32	24.54	24.60	Q
3	Alexandra Feracci (FRA)	Suparinpei	24.6	0.7	17.22	24.66	24.60	Q
3	Alexandra Feracci (FRA)	Suparinpei	24.8	0.3	7.44	24.66	24.60	Q
4	Jasmin Jüttner (GER)	Papuren	23.2	0.7	16.23	23.31	23.43	
4	Jasmin Jüttner (GER)	Papuren	23.6	0.3	7.08	23.31	23.43	
4	Jasmin Jüttner (GER)	Gojushiho Dai	23.6	0.7	16.52	23.54	23.43	
4	Jasmin Jüttner (GER)	Gojushiho Dai	23.4	0.3	7.02	23.54	23.43	

==== Group B ====
Rank	Athlete	Technic	Total	Factor	Result	Total kata	Average total	Notes
1	Viviana Bottaro (ITA)	Anan Dai	26.0	0.7	18.20	25.82	26.05	Q
1	Viviana Bottaro (ITA)	Anan Dai	25.4	0.3	7.62	25.82	26.05	Q
1	Viviana Bottaro (ITA)	Suparinpei	26.4	0.7	18.48	26.28	26.05	Q
1	Viviana Bottaro (ITA)	Suparinpei	26.0	0.3	7.80	26.28	26.05	Q
2	Dilara Bozan (TUR)	Suparinpei	24.6	0.7	17.22	24.54	24.77	Q
2	Dilara Bozan (TUR)	Suparinpei	24.4	0.3	7.32	24.54	24.77	Q
2	Dilara Bozan (TUR)	Anan Dai	25.0	0.7	17.50	25.00	24.77	Q
2	Dilara Bozan (TUR)	Anan Dai	25.0	0.3	7.50	25.00	24.77	Q
3	Maryia Fursava (BLR)	Papuren	24.2	0.7	16.94	24.26	24.33	Q
3	Maryia Fursava (BLR)	Papuren	24.4	0.3	7.32	24.26	24.33	Q
3	Maryia Fursava (BLR)	Anan Dai	24.4	0.7	17.08	24.40	24.33	Q
3	Maryia Fursava (BLR)	Anan Dai	24.4	0.3	7.32	24.40	24.33	Q
4	Veronika Mišková (CZE)	Suparinpei	24.0	0.7	16.80	23.88	23.81	
4	Veronika Mišková (CZE)	Suparinpei	23.6	0.3	7.08	23.88	23.81	
4	Veronika Mišková (CZE)	Anan Dai	23.8	0.7	16.66	23.74	23.81	
4	Veronika Mišková (CZE)	Anan Dai	23.6	0.3	7.08	23.74	23.81	

=== Ranking round ===
==== Group A ====
Rank	Athlete	Technic	Total	Factor	Result	Total kata	Notes
1	Sandra Sánchez (ESP)	Papuren	27.6	0.7	19.32	27.60	QG
1	Sandra Sánchez (ESP)	Papuren	27.6	0.3	8.28	27.60	QG
2	Patrícia Esparteiro (POR)	Suparinpei	25.4	0.7	17.78	25.46	QB
2	Patrícia Esparteiro (POR)	Suparinpei	25.6	0.3	7.68	25.46	QB
3	Alexandra Feracci (FRA)	Papuren	25.0	0.7	17.50	25.00	QB
3	Alexandra Feracci (FRA)	Papuren	25.0	0.3	7.50	25.00	QB

==== Group B ====
Rank	Athlete	Technic	Total	Factor	Result	Total kata	Notes
1	Viviana Bottaro (ITA)	Papuren	27.0	0.7	18.90	27.06	QG
1	Viviana Bottaro (ITA)	Papuren	27.2	0.3	8.16	27.06	QG
2	Dilara Bozan (TUR)	Chatanyara; Kushanku	25.8	0.7	18.06	25.80	QB
2	Dilara Bozan (TUR)	Chatanyara; Kushanku	25.8	0.3	7.74	25.80	QB
3	Maryia Fursava (BLR)	Anan	24.6	0.7	17.22	24.66	QB
3	Maryia Fursava (BLR)	Anan	24.8	0.3	7.44	24.66	QB

=== Bronze medal match ===
Rank	Athlete	Technic	Total	Factor	Result	Total kata
5	Maryia Fursava (BLR)		23.8	0.7	16.66	23.68
5	Maryia Fursava (BLR)		23.4	0.3	7.02	23.68
3rd place, bronze medalist(s)	Patrícia Esparteiro (POR)		24.8	0.7	17.36	24.68
3rd place, bronze medalist(s)	Patrícia Esparteiro (POR)		24.4	0.3	7.32	24.68

Rank	Athlete	Technic	Total	Factor	Result	Total kata
5	Alexandra Feracci (FRA)		25.0	0.7	17.50	24.94
5	Alexandra Feracci (FRA)		24.8	0.3	7.44	24.94
3rd place, bronze medalist(s)	Dilara Bozan (TUR)		25.4	0.7	17.78	25.46
3rd place, bronze medalist(s)	Dilara Bozan (TUR)		25.6	0.3	7.68	25.46

=== Gold medal match ===
Rank	Athlete	Technic	Total	Factor	Result	Total kata
2nd place, silver medalist(s)	Viviana Bottaro (ITA)		26.2	0.7	18.34	26.14
2nd place, silver medalist(s)	Viviana Bottaro (ITA)		26.0	0.3	7.80	26.14
1st place, gold medalist(s)	Sandra Sánchez (ESP)		27.2	0.7	19.04	27.32
1st place, gold medalist(s)	Sandra Sánchez (ESP)		27.6	0.3	8.28	27.32
