= Turkey at the 2019 European Games =

- IOC code: TUR
- NOC: Turkish Olympic Committee
- Website: www.olimpiyatkomitesi.org.tr

in Minsk, Belarus 21 – 30 June 2019
- Competitors: 115 in 14 sports
- Flag bearer: Mete Gazoz
- Medals Ranked 24th: Gold 2 Silver 6 Bronze 7 Total 15

European Games appearances (overview)
- 2015; 2019; 2023; 2027

Turkey competed at the 2019 European Games, in Minsk, Belarus from 21 to 30 June 2019. Turkey has previously competed at the 2015 European Games in Baku, Azerbaijan, where it won 29 medals, including six golds.

== Medalists ==
Medal	Name	Sport	Event	Date
Gold	Mikail Özerler	Judo	Men's 90 kg	24 June
Gold	Buse Naz Çakıroğlu	Boxing	Women's 51 kg	30 June
Silver	Soner Demirtaş	Wrestling	Men's 74 kg	26 June
Silver	Ali Sofuoğlu	Karate	Men's kata	30 June
Silver	Uğur Aktaş	Karate	Men's kumite 84 kg	30 June
Silver	Serap Özçelik	Karate	Women's kumite 50 kg	30 June
Silver	Meltem Hocaoğlu	Karate	Women's kumite +68 kg	30 June
Silver	Ahmet Önder	Gymnastics	Artistic Gymnastics, Horizontal Bar	30 June
Bronze	Yeşim Bostan; Evren Çağıran	Archery	Mixed team compound	23 June
Bronze	Jak Ali Harvey	Athletics	Men's 100 m	23 June
Bronze	Evin Demirhan	Wrestling	Women's 50 kg	28 June
Bronze	Süleyman Atlı	Wrestling	Men's 57 kg	26 June
Bronze	Dilara Bozan	Karate	Women's kata	30 June
Bronze	Ferhat Arıcan	Gymnastics	Men's parallel bars	30 June
Bronze	Merve Çoban	Karate	Women's kumite 61 kg	30 June

Medals by sport
Sport	1st place, gold medalist(s)	2nd place, silver medalist(s)	3rd place, bronze medalist(s)	Total
Archery	0	0	1	1
Athletics	0	0	1	1
Boxing	1	0	0	1
Gymnastics	0	1	1	2
Judo	1	0	0	1
Karate	0	4	2	6
Wrestling	0	1	2	3
Total	2	6	7	15

== Archery ==
Recurve

Athlete	Event	Ranking round		Round of 64	Round of 32	Round of 16	Quarterfinals	Semifinals	Final / BM	
Athlete	Event	Score	Seed	Opposition Score	Opposition Score	Opposition Score	Opposition Score	Opposition Score	Opposition Score	Rank
Mete Gazoz	Men's individual	685 GR	1	Bye	Flink (SWE); W 6–0	Faber (SUI); L 2–6	Did not advance			
Yasemin Anagöz	Women's individual	645	10	Bye	Kuoppa (FIN); L 0–6	Did not advance				
Aybüke Aktuna	Women's individual	624	25	Timinskienė (LTU); W 6–5	Dziominskaya (BLR); L 4–6	Did not advance				
Gülnaz Büşranur Coşkun	Women's individual	618	28	Laursen (DEN); W 6–2	Adiceom (FRA); L 4–6	Did not advance				
Yasemin Anagöz; Aybüke Aktuna; Gülnaz Büşranur Coşkun	Women's team	1887	5	—N/a			Great Britain; L 0–6	Did not advance		5
Mete Gazoz; Yasemin Anagöz	Mixed team	1330	3	—N/a	Bye	Finland; W 5–1	Germany; L 0–6	Did not advance		

Compound

Athlete	Event	Ranking round		Round of 16	Quarterfinals	Semifinals	Final / BM	
Athlete	Event	Score	Seed	Opposition Score	Opposition Score	Opposition Score	Opposition Score	Rank
Evren Çağıran	Men's individual	697	7	Borgström (SWE); W 142–136	Schloesser (NED); L 144–147	Did not advance		
Yeşim Bostan	Women's individual	697	5	Mason (GBR); W 140 (10)–140 (9)	Meißner (GER); W 145–139	Ellison (SLO); L 145–139	Dodemont (FRA); L 142–148	4
Evren Çağıran; Yeşim Bostan	Mixed team	1394	5	Bye	France; W 151–148	Russia; L 145–152	Croatia; W 153–152	3rd place, bronze medalist(s)

== Badminton ==
Athletes	Event	Group stage				Round of 16	Quarterfinals	Semifinals	Final	Rank
Athletes	Event	Opposition Score	Opposition Score	Opposition Score	Rank	Opposition Score	Opposition Score	Opposition Score	Opposition Score	Rank
Emre Lale	Men's singles	Krausz (HUN); W 2–1	Roovers (GER)	Axelsen (DEN); Walkover						
Neslihan Yiğit	Women's singles	Zetchiri (BUL)	Ulitina (UKR)	Kuuba (EST)						
Bengisu Erçetin; Nazlıcan İnci	Women's doubles	Piek / Seinen (NED)	Goliszewski / Käpplein (GER)	Bášová / Fuchsová (CZE)		—N/a				

== Karate ==
Men

Athlete	Category	Group stage				Semifinals	Final	
Athlete	Category	Opposition Result	Opposition Result	Opposition Result	Rank	Opposition Result	Opposition Result	Rank
Ali Sofuoğlu	Men's Kata	26.31	—N/a	—N/a	1 Q	27.12 1 Q	Quintero (ESP); L 25.60	2nd place, silver medalist(s)
Eray Şamdan	60 kg	Gogoloşi (ROU); W 2–2	Kalniņš (LAT); L 3–4	Plakhutin (RUS); L 1–5	3	Did not advance		
Burak Uygur	67 kg	Rosiello (BEL); D 0–0	Maresca (ITA); D 0–0	Hodžić (MNE); D 0–0	3	Did not advance		
Erman Eltemur	75 kg	Hárspataki (HUN); D 0–0	Aghayev (AZE); L 0–1	Kellaway (GBR); W 3–1	3	Did not advance		
Uğur Aktaş	84 kg	Martina (ITA); W 3–3	Isakau (BLR); W 1–0	Abdesselem (FRA); W 2–1	1 Q	Chobotar (UKR); W 4–1	Kvesić (CRO); L 0–0	2nd place, silver medalist(s)

Women

Athlete	Category	Group stage				Semifinals	Final	
Athlete	Category	Opposition Result	Opposition Result	Opposition Result	Rank	Opposition Result	Opposition Result	Rank
Dilara Bozan	Women's Kata	24.77	—N/a	—N/a	2 Q	25.80 2 Q	Feracci (FRA); W 25.46	3rd place, bronze medalist(s)
Serap Özçelik	50 kg	Aliyeva (AZE); W 4–0	Koulinkovitch (BLR); W 6–0	Hubrich (GER); L 0–1	1 Q	Bouderbane (FRA); W 2–0	Plank (AUT); L 1–5	2nd place, silver medalist(s)
Tuba Yakan	55 kg	Terliuga (UKR); L 0–1	Goranova (BUL); L 3–6	Connell (GBR); W 4–1	3	Did not advance		
Merve Çoban	61 kg	Ferrer (SRB); D 0–0	Dzyachkova (BLR); D 3–3	Ristić (SLO); W 2–0	1 Q	Serogina (UKR); L 2–2	Did not advance	3rd place, bronze medalist(s)
Meltem Hocaoğlu	+68 kg	Garcia (FRA); W 1–0	Martynouskaya (BLR); W 6–0	Palacio (ESP); D 0–0	1 Q	Keinänen (FIN); W 0–0	Palacio (ESP); L 1–4	2nd place, silver medalist(s)

== Wrestling ==
Men's freestyle

Athlete	Event	Round of 16	Quarterfinal	Semifinal	Repechage	Final / BM	
Athlete	Event	Opposition Result	Opposition Result	Opposition Result	Opposition Result	Opposition Result	Rank
Süleyman Atlı	57 kg	Metreveli (ESP); W 10-0	Mićić (SRB); L 5-6	—N/a	Lomtadze (GEO); W 6-0	Markovych (UKR); W 12-9	3rd place, bronze medalist(s)
Selahattin Kılıçsallayan	65 kg	Ohannesian (UKR); L 0-11	Did not advance				14
Soner Demirtaş	74 kg	Gadzhiyev (AZE); W 4-3	Binenmpaoum (GRE); W 15-4	Mykhailov (UKR); W 5-2	—N/a	Sidakov (RUS); L 0-4	2nd place, silver medalist(s)
Fatih Erdin	86 kg	Shabanau (BLR); L 3-4	—N/a		Kalashnikov (ISR); W 12-0	Dudarov (GER); L 8-10	5
Baki Şahin	97 kg	Mchedlidze (UKR); L 0-6	Did not advance				11
Fatih Yaşarlı	125 kg	Mihailovs (LAT); W 5-0	Khizriev (RUS); L 4-9	—N/a	Kargiotakis (GRE); W 4-0	Khotsianivskyi (UKR); L 1-2	5

Men's Greco-Roman

Athlete	Event	Round of 16	Quarterfinal	Semifinal	Repechage	Final / BM	
Athlete	Event	Opposition Result	Opposition Result	Opposition Result	Opposition Result	Opposition Result	Rank
Kerem Kamal	60 kg	Melikyan (ARM); W 4-0	Maryanyan (RUS); L 2-5	—N/a	Ciobanu (MDA); L 9-10	Did not advance	7
Enes Başar	67 kg	Bernatek (POL); W 7-5	Kalinichenko (UKR); L 0-5	Did not advance			8
Yunus Emre Başar	77 kg	Christen (SUI); W 4-0	Maksimović (SRB); W 6-4	Chekhirkin (RUS); L 0-8	—N/a	Kessidis (SWE); L 3-12	5
Metehan Başar	87 kg	Ozdoev (RUS); L 0-5	Did not advance				13
Cenk İldem	97 kg	Kuosmanen (FIN); W 3-1	Kajaia (SRB); W 7-5	Hrabovik (BLR); L 1-2	—N/a	Baldauf (SWE); L 1-6	5
Osman Yıldırım	130 kg	David (CZE); W 3-1	Semenov (RUS); L 1-7	Did not advance			6

Women's freestyle

Athlete	Event	Round of 16	Quarterfinal	Semifinal	Repechage	Final / BM	
Athlete	Event	Opposition Result	Opposition Result	Opposition Result	Opposition Result	Opposition Result	Rank
Evin Demirhan	50 kg	Bay	Grunewald (FRA); W 8-4	Stadnik (AZE); L 1-6	—N/a	Łukasiak (POL); W 6-2	3rd place, bronze medalist(s)
Zeynep Yetgil	53 kg	Prevolaraki (GRE); L 4-10	—N/a		Leorda (MDA); W 8-3	Hemmer (GER); L 0-2	5
Bediha Gün	57 kg	Chatsatourova (GRE); W 13-3	Lindborg (SWE); W 10-0	Hristova (BUL); L 2-6	—N/a	Kolesnik (AZE); L 4-9	5
Aslı Tuğcu	62 kg	Zaicevaitė (LTU); W 5-0	Incze (ROU); L 2-3	Did not advance			7
Buse Tosun	68 kg	Bratchikova (RUS); L 2-4	—N/a		Fransson (SWE); L 3-5	Did not advance	9
Ayşegül Özbege	76 kg	Axente (ROU); W 2-2	Rädelt (GER); L 0-7	—N/a	Solheim (NOR); L 0-4	Did not advance	10
