= Sweden at the 2019 European Games =

- Flag of Sweden
- IOC code: SWE
- NOC: Swedish Olympic Committee
- Website: www.sok.se (in Swedish)

in Minsk, Belarus 21–30 June 2019
- Competitors: 47 in 10 sports
- Flag bearer: Anna Bernholm (judo)
- Medals Ranked 23rd: Gold 3 Silver 1 Bronze 4 Total 8

European Games appearances (overview)
- 2015; 2019; 2023; 2027

Sweden competed at the 2019 European Games, in Minsk, Belarus from 21 to 30 June 2019. The Swedish Olympic Committee had selected 51 athletes to compete at the games.

== Medalists ==
Medal	Name	Sport	Event	Date
Gold	Tommy Macias	Judo	Men's 73 kg	23 June
Gold	Stefan Nilsson	Shooting	Men's skeet	27 June
Gold	Sofia Mattsson	Wrestling	Women's freestyle 53 kg	27 June
Silver	Mattias Falck; Kristian Karlsson; Jon Persson	Table tennis	Men's team	29 June
Bronze	Anna Bernholm	Judo	Women's 70 kg	23 June
Bronze	Agnes Alexiusson	Boxing	Women's 60 kg	28 June
Bronze	Alex Bjurberg Kessidis	Wrestling	Men's Greco-Roman 77 kg	29 June
Bronze	Jessica Castles	Gymnastics	Women's floor exercise	30 June

== Archery ==
Athlete	Event	Ranking round		Round of 64	Round of 32	Round of 16	Quarterfinals	Semifinals	Final / BM	
Athlete	Event	Score	Seed	Opposition Score	Opposition Score	Opposition Score	Opposition Score	Opposition Score	Opposition Score	Rank
Ludvig Flink	Men's individual recurve	641	32	El Helali (CYP); W 6–0	Gazoz (TUR); L 0–6	did not advance				=17
Christine Bjerendal	Women's individual recurve	646	9	BYE	Pavlova (UKR); L 0–6	did not advance				=17
Ludvig Flink; Christine Bjerendal	Mixed team recurve	1287	12	—N/a	De Smedt/ Destrooper (BEL); W 6–2	Bazarzhapov/ Perova (RUS); L 1–5	did not advance			=9
Hampus Borgström	Men's individual compound	690	10	—N/a		Çağıran (TUR); L 136–142	did not advance			=9

== Badminton ==
Athletes	Event	Group stage				Round of 16	Quarterfinals	Semifinals	Finals	Rank
Athletes	Event	Opposition Score	Opposition Score	Opposition Score	Rank	Opposition Score	Opposition Score	Opposition Score	Opposition Score	Rank
Felix Burestedt	Men's singles	Pochtarov (UKR); W 2–0	Ludík (CZE); W 2–1	Penty (GBR); L 0–2	2 Q	Abián (ESP); W 2–1	Must (EST); L 1–2	did not advance		=5
Emma Karlsson; Johanna Magnusson	Women's doubles	Bolotova / Davletova (RUS); L 1–2	Ilyinskaya / Zharka (UKR); W 2–0	Garino / Iversen (ITA); W 2–0	2 Q	—N/a	Lefel / Tran (FRA); L 0–2	did not advance		=5

== Boxing ==
Athlete	Event	Round of 32	Round of 16	Quarterfinals	Semifinals	Final	
Athlete	Event	Opposition Result	Opposition Result	Opposition Result	Opposition Result	Opposition Result	Rank
Adam Chartoi	Men's 75 kg	Tsagkrakos (GRE); W 3–2	van der Pas (NED); W 4–1	Cavallaro (ITA); L 1–4	did not advance		=5
Liridon Nuha	Men's 81 kg	Abu-Lubdeh (GER); L 2–3	did not advance				=17
Agnes Alexiusson	Women's 60 kg	—N/a	Rygielska (POL); W 5–0	Eliseeva (BUL); W 5–0	Harrington (IRL); L 0–5	Did not advance	3rd place, bronze medalist(s)
Love Holgersson	Women's 75 kg	—N/a	Sürmeneli (TUR); L 1–4	did not advance			=9

== Canoe sprint ==
Men

Athlete	Event	Heats		Semifinals		Finals	
Athlete	Event	Time	Rank	Time	Rank	Time	Rank
Petter Menning	K-1 200 m	34.900	1 QF	BYE		39.486	4
Martin Nathell	K-1 1000 m	3:36.173	5 QS	3:29.436	5 FB	3:39.806	14
Martin Nathell; Albert Pettersson	K-2 1000 m	3:15.834	7 QS	3:16.965	9	did not advance	
Joakim Lindberg	K-1 5000 m	—N/a				22:32.724	8

Women

Athlete	Event	Heats		Semifinals		Finals	
Athlete	Event	Time	Rank	Time	Rank	Time	Rank
Linnea Stensils	K-1 200 m	41.333	2 QS	40.427	4 FB	43.878	10
Linnea Stensils	K-1 500 m	1:50.440	2 QS	1:50.096	2 FA	2:10.449	8
Melina Andersson; Moa Wikberg	K-2 200 m	38.489	6 QS	28.191	4	did not advance	
Melina Andersson; Moa Wikberg	K-2 500 m	1:43.354	5 QS	1:40.290	4	did not advance	
Julia Lagestam	K-1 5000 m	—N/a				26:15.432	12

== Gymnastics ==
=== Artistic ===
Women

Athlete	Event	Qualification		Final	
Athlete	Event	Points	Rank	Points	Rank
Jessica Castles	All-around	47.498	24	did not advance	
Jessica Castles	Balance beam	11.833	18	did not advance	
Jessica Castles	Floor exercise	12.966	3 Q	12.933	3rd place, bronze medalist(s)
Jessica Castles	Uneven bars	9.433	34	did not advance	
Jessica Castles	Vault	12.266	–	—N/a	

=== Trampoline ===
Athlete	Event	Qualification		Final	
Athlete	Event	Points	Rank	Points	Rank
Jonas Nordfors	Men's individual	62.800	21	did not advance	
Måns Åberg	Men's individual	101.325	16	did not advance	
Jonas Nordfors; Måns Åberg	Men's synchronized	—N/a		43.000	6
Lina Sjöberg	Women's individual	96.880	10	did not advance	

== Judo ==
Athlete	Event	Round of 32	Round of 16	Quarterfinals	Semifinals	Repechage	Final / BM	
Athlete	Event	Opposition Result	Opposition Result	Opposition Result	Opposition Result	Opposition Result	Opposition Result	Rank
Tommy Macias	Men's 73 kg	Zingg (GER); W 10–0	Szabó (HUN); W 1–0	Butbul (ISR); W 10–0	Shavdatuashvili (GEO); W 1–0	BYE	Orujov (AZE); W 11–1	1st place, gold medalist(s)
Victor Busch	Men's 81 kg	Ungvari (HUN); L 0–10	did not advance					
Robin Pacek	Men's 81 kg	Musil (CZE); W 11–0	Casse (BEL); L 0–1	did not advance				
Joakim Dvärby	Men's 100 kg	Frey (GER); L 0–1	did not advance					
Anna Bernholm	Women's 70 kg	BYE	Polling (NED); W 10–0	Pinot (FRA); L 0–10	Did not advance	Polleres (AUT); W 10–0	Gahie (FRA); W 11–0	3rd place, bronze medalist(s)

== Karate ==
Athlete	Event	Pool round				Semifinal	Final / RM	Rank
Athlete	Event	Opposition Result	Opposition Result	Opposition Result	Rank	Opposition Result	Opposition Result	Rank
Hana Antunović	Women's +68 kg	Ferracuti (ITA); L 0–2	Chatziliadou (GRE); L 0–5	Keinänen (FIN); L 0–3	4	did not advance		

== Shooting ==
Men

Athlete	Event	Qualification		Final	
Athlete	Event	Points	Rank	Points	Rank
Marcus Madsen	10 m air rifle	625.0	18	did not advance	
Marcus Madsen	50 m rifle three positions	1152	30	did not advance	
Stefan Nilsson	Skeet	121	5 Q	57	1st place, gold medalist(s)
Morgan Johansson	10 m air pistol	569	27	did not advance	
Marcus Svensson	Skeet	119	12	did not advance	

Women

Athlete	Event	Qualification		Final	
Athlete	Event	Points	Rank	Points	Rank
Isabelle Johansson	10 m air rifle	619.6	37	did not advance	
Lotten Johansson	10 m air rifle	620.8	34	did not advance	
Lotten Johansson	50 m rifle three positions	1144	34	did not advance	
Viktoria Larsson	Skeet	108	19	did not advance	

Mixed team

Athlete	Event	Qualification		Semifinal		Final / BM	
Athlete	Event	Points	Rank	Points	Rank	Points	Rank
Marcus Madsen; Lotten Johansson	10 metre air rifle	623.8	10	did not advance			
Marcus Madsen; Lotten Johansson	50 metre rifle prone	404.7	24	did not advance			
Stefan Nilsson; Viktoria Larsson	Skeet	134	14	—N/a		did not advance	

== Table tennis ==
Athlete	Event	Round 1	Round 2	Round 3	Round of 16	Quarterfinals	Semifinals	Final / BM	
Athlete	Event	Opposition Score	Opposition Score	Opposition Score	Opposition Score	Opposition Score	Opposition Score	Opposition Score	Rank
Mattias Falck	Men's singles	BYE		Shibaev (RUS); L 0–4	did not advance				=17
Kristian Karlsson	Men's singles	BYE		Gardos (AUT); W 4–2	Lebesson (FRA); L 2–4	did not advance			=9
Mattias Falck; Kristian Karlsson; Jon Persson	Men's team	—N/a			BYE	Croatia (CRO); W 3–2	Denmark (DEN); W 3–1	Germany (GER); L 0–3	2nd place, silver medalist(s)
Linda Bergström	Women's singles	BYE	Yovkova (BUL); W 4–2	Balážová (SVK); W 4–0	Póta (HUN); W 4–0	Ni (LUX); L 1–4	did not advance		=5
Matilda Ekholm	Women's singles	BYE		Partyka (POL); W 4–2	Mikhaylova (RUS); L 3–4	did not advance			=9
Filippa Bergand; Linda Bergström; Matilda Ekholm	Women's team	—N/a			Spain (ESP); W 3–1	Romania (ROU); L 1–3	did not advance		=5
Mattias Falck; Matilda Ekholm	Mixed doubles	—N/a			Franziska/Solja (GER); L 1–3	did not advance			=9

== Wrestling ==
Men's Greco-Roman

Athlete	Event	Round of 16	Quarterfinal	Semifinal	Repechage	Final / BM	
Athlete	Event	Opposition Result	Opposition Result	Opposition Result	Opposition Result	Opposition Result	Rank
Ardit Fazljija	60 kg	Torba (HUN); L 0–6	did not advance		Arnaut (ROU); L 4–6	Did not advance	10
Alex Bjurberg Kessidis	77 kg	Bolkvadze (GEO); W 3–1	Chekhirkin (RUS); L 0–6	Did not advance	Aleksandrov (BUL); W 4^{F}–5	Başar (TUR); W 12^{F}–3	3rd place, bronze medalist(s)

Women's freestyle

Athlete	Event	Round of 16	Quarterfinal	Semifinal	Repechage	Final / BM	
Athlete	Event	Opposition Result	Opposition Result	Opposition Result	Opposition Result	Opposition Result	Rank
Sofia Mattsson	53 kg	Yetgil (TUR); W 12–4	Leorda (MDA); W 10–0	Hemmer (GER); W 10–2	BYE	Khavaldzhy (UKR); W 6–4	1st place, gold medalist(s)
Johanna Lindborg	57 kg	Báez (ESP); W 6–0	Gün (TUR); L 0–10	did not advance			7
Johanna Mattsson	62 kg	Ivanova (BLR); W 6*–6	Yusein (BUL); L 0–4	did not advance			8
Jenny Fransson	68 kg	Netreba (AZE); W 3–1	Bratchikova (RUS); L 2–2*	Did not advance	Tosun (TUR); W 5–3	Cherkasova (UKR); L 2–6	5
