= Sambo at the 2019 European Games – Women's 52 kg =

Women's 52 kg at the 2019 European Games
- Venue: Minsk Sports Palace
- Date: 23 June
- Competitors: 8 from 8 nations

Medalists
gold medal	Diana Ryabova	Russia
silver medal	Maryna Zharskaya	Belarus
bronze medal	Irene Díaz	Spain
bronze medal	Paulina Eșanu	Moldova

The women's 52 kg sambo event at the 2019 European Games in Minsk was held on 23 June at the Minsk Sports Palace.

== Results ==
Legend

- E3 – Contestant's elimination by the doctor's
- VS – Total victory by decisive superiority
- VH – Total victory – painful hold

Quarterfinals
Diana Ryabova (RUS)	0^{VH}
Galya Ivanova (BUL)	0
Mariia Buiok (UKR)	8^{VS}
Diana Kovacs (ROU)	0
Irene Díaz (ESP)	8^{VS}
Sylvia Reviláková (SVK)	0
Paulina Eșanu (MDA)	0
Maryna Zharskaya (BLR)	1

Semifinals
Diana Ryabova (RUS)	0
Mariia Buiok (UKR)	0
Irene Díaz (ESP)	1
Maryna Zharskaya (BLR)	1

Final
Diana Ryabova (RUS)	0^{VH}
Maryna Zharskaya (BLR)	0

Repechage

Repechage
Galya Ivanova (BUL)	2
Diana Kovacs (ROU)	7

Third place
Diana Kovacs (ROU)	0
Irene Díaz (ESP)	9^{VS}

Repechage
Sylvia Reviláková (SVK)	DNF^{E3}
Paulina Eșanu (MDA)

Third place
Paulina Eșanu (MDA)	1
Mariia Buiok (UKR)	1
