= Czech Republic at the 2019 European Games =

- IOC code: CZE
- NOC: Czech Olympic Committee
- Website: www.olympic.cz

in Minsk, Belarus 21 – 30 June 2019
- Competitors: 123 in 13 sports
- Flag bearer: Lukáš Krpálek
- Medals Ranked 25th: Gold 2 Silver 5 Bronze 6 Total 13

European Games appearances (overview)
- 2015; 2019; 2023; 2027

Czech Republic competed at the 2019 European Games, in Minsk, Belarus from 21 to 30 June 2019. Czech Republic has previously competed at the 2015 European Games in Baku, Azerbaijan, where it won 7 medals.

== Medalists ==
Medal	Name	Sport	Event	Date
Gold	David Kostelecký	Shooting	Men's trap	23 June
Gold	Tomáš Bábek	Track cycling	Men's 1 km time trial	29 June
Silver	Nikola Mazurová	Shooting	Women's air rifle	24 June
Silver	Tomáš Nýdrle	Shooting	Men's skeet	27 June
Silver	Aneta Holasová	Artistic gymnastics	Women's floor	30 June
Silver	Jan Tesař; Barbora Malíková; Lada Vondrová; Michal Desenský	Athletics	Mixed 4 x 400 metres relay	23 June
Silver	Filip Sasínek; Diana Mezuliáníková; Patrik Šorm; Marcela Pírková	Athletics	Mixed distance pursuit relay	23 June
Bronze	Aneta Brabcová; Filip Nepejchal	Shooting	Mixed team air rifle	22 June
Bronze	Filip Nepejchal	Shooting	Air rifle	24 June
Bronze	Jan Bárta	Road cycling	Men's time trial	25 June
Bronze	Nikola Mazurová	Shooting	Women's 50m rifle 3 positions	27 June
Bronze	Jarmila Machačová	Track cycling	Women's points race	27 June
Bronze	Barbora Šumová; Jakub Tomeček	Shooting	Mixed team skeet	28 June

== Archery ==
Recurve

Athlete	Event	Ranking round		Round of 64	Round of 32	Round of 16	Quarterfinals	Semifinals	Final / BM	
Athlete	Event	Score	Seed	Opposition Score	Opposition Score	Opposition Score	Opposition Score	Opposition Score	Opposition Score	Rank
Erik Ebermann	Men's individual	648	22	Forlani (SMR); L 4–6	Did not advance					33

Compound

Athlete	Event	Ranking round		Round of 16	Quarterfinals	Semifinals	Final / BM	
Athlete	Event	Score	Seed	Opposition Score	Opposition Score	Opposition Score	Opposition Score	Rank
Martin Vaněk	Men's individual	687	12	Seywert (LUX); L 142–144	Did not advance			9

== Badminton ==
Athletes	Event	Group stage				Quarterfinals	Semifinals	Final	Rank
Athletes	Event	Opposition Score	Opposition Score	Opposition Score	Rank	Opposition Score	Opposition Score	Opposition Score	Rank
Daniel Zach; Ondřej Dygrýn; Vladimír Sismilich; Michal Křemen; Roman Zachrla	Men's 3x3 tournament	Netherlands (NED); W 18–16	Latvia (LAT); L 17–21	Turkey (TUR); W 22–13	2	Russia (RUS); L 15–22	Did not advance		5
Denisa Harapesová; Kamila Hošková; Alžběta Levinská; Monika Satoranská	Women's 3x3 tournament	Hungary (HUN); W 20–19	Romania (ROU); W 21–3	Germany (GER); L 14–21	2	Estonia (EST); L 12–15	Did not advance		5

== Basketball ==
Athletes	Event	Group stage				Round of 16	Quarterfinals	Semifinals	Final	Rank
Athletes	Event	Opposition Score	Opposition Score	Opposition Score	Rank	Opposition Score	Opposition Score	Opposition Score	Opposition Score	Rank
Milan Ludík	Men's singles	Penty (GBR); L 0–2	Burestedt (SWE); L 1–2	Pochtarov (UKR); L 1–2	4	Did not advance				24
Kateřina Tomalová	Women's singles	Blichfeldt (DEN); L 0–2	Pope (LAT); W 2–0	Repiská (SVK); L 0–2	3	Did not advance				17
Jaromír Janáček; Tomáš Švejda	Men's doubles	Flåten Jørgensen / Mork (NOR); W 2–0	Kaisti / Larkimo (FIN); L 0–2	Ivanov / Sozonov (RUS); L 0–2	3	—N/a	Did not advance			9
Alžběta Bášová; Michaela Fuchsová	Women's doubles	Erçetin / İnci (TUR); L 0–2	Piek / Seinen (NED); L 0–2	Golszewski / Käpplein (GER); L 0–2	4	—N/a	Did not advance			17
Jakub Bitman; Alžběta Bášová	Mixed doubles	Vlaar / Mitsova (BUL); L 1–2	Schaller / Burkart (SUI); L 1–2	Adcock / Adcock (GBR); L 0–2	4	—N/a	Did not advance			13

== Gymnastics ==
=== Aerobic gymnastics ===
Athletes	Event	Final	
Athletes	Event	Score	Rank
Kristýna Bernátová; Tereza Kudláčková; Barbora Karlíková; Tereza Kočová; Dita Hanzalová	Groups	19.616	6

=== Artistic gymnastics ===
Athlete	Event	Qualification		Final	
Athlete	Event	Score	Rank	Score	Rank
Aneta Holasová	All-around	51.065	12 Q	50.932	10
Aneta Holasová	Vault	13.266	12	Did not advance	
Aneta Holasová	Uneven bars	12.300	23	Did not advance	
Aneta Holasová	Beam	12.333	10 R2	Did not advance	
Aneta Holasová	Floor	12.866	6 Q	12.966	2nd place, silver medalist(s)
Dominika Ponížilová	All-around	50.166	15 Q	48.799	18
Dominika Ponížilová	Vault	13.400	8 R1	Did not advance	
Dominika Ponížilová	Uneven bars	12.700	20	Did not advance	
Dominika Ponížilová	Beam	12.166	14	Did not advance	
Dominika Ponížilová	Floor	12.000	22	Did not advance	

=== Trampoline gymnastics ===
Athlete	Event	Qualification				Final	
Athlete	Event	Comp	Free	Total	Rank	Score	Rank
Adam Sült	Men	47.935	5.805	53.740	24	Did not advance	
Zita Frydrychová	Women	46.140	47.800	94.210	14	Did not advance	

== Judo ==
Athlete	Event	Round of 64	Round of 32	Round of 16	Quarterfinals	Semifinals	Repechage	Bronze-medal match	Final	Rank
Athlete	Event	Opposition Score	Opposition Score	Opposition Score	Opposition Score	Opposition Score	Opposition Score	Opposition Score	Opposition Score	Rank
David Pulkrábek	Men's 60 kg	—N/a	Szabó (HUN); W 1s1–0s1	Khyar (FRA); L 0h–10	Did not advance					
Pavel Petřikov	Men's 66 kg	BYE	Minkou (BLR); W 10s1–1	Iadov (UKR); W 1–0s1	Margvelashvili (GEO); L 0s2–10	Did not advance	Burns (IRL); W 1–0s1	Niniashvili (GEO); L 0h–10	Did not advance	5
Jaromír Musil	Men's 81 kg	—N/a	Pacek (SWE); L 0–11s1	Did not advance						
Ivan Petr	Men's 81 kg	—N/a	Borchashvili (AUT); L 0–10s1	Did not advance						
David Klammert	Men's 90 kg	Bubanja (AUT); W 10s2–0s2	Grossklaus (SUI); L 0s2–10s1	Did not advance						
Michal Horák	Men's 100 kg	—N/a	Ohat (HUN); W 11s1–0	Did not advance						
Lukáš Krpálek	Men's +100 kg	—N/a		Koleśnyk (UKR); W 10s2–0s2	Tasoev (RUS); L 0–1s2	Did not advance	Meyer (NED); W 10s1–0	Grol (NED); L 0–11s1	Did not advance	5
Jakub Ječmínek	DNS	—N/a								

== Karate ==
Athlete	Event	Elimination round		Ranking round		Bronze medal match		Final	
Athlete	Event	Score	Rank	Score	Rank	Score	Rank	Score	Rank
Veronika Mišková	Women's kata	23.81	4	Did not advance					7

== Sambo ==
Athlete	Event	Round of 16	Quarterfinals	Semifinals	Repechage	Bronze medal match	Final	Rank
Athlete	Event	Opposition Score	Opposition Score	Opposition Score	Opposition Score	Opposition Score	Opposition Score	Rank
Miroslav Vacek	Men's 90 kg	Sahakyan (ARM); L 0–8	Did not advance		Stetsenko (UKR); L 0–8	Did not advance		7
Lukáš Tureček		DNS	—N/a					

== Wrestling ==
Athlete	Event	Round of 16	Quarterfinals	Semifinals	Repechage	Bronze medal match	Final	Rank
Athlete	Event	Opposition Score	Opposition Score	Opposition Score	Opposition Score	Opposition Score	Opposition Score	Rank
Štěpán David	Men's Greco-Roman 130 kg	Yildirim (TUR); L 1–3	Did not advance					10
Lenka Hocková	Women's freestyle 57 kg	Nichita (MDA); L 0–11	Did not advance					16
Adéla Hanzlíčková	Women's freestyle 68 kg	Wieszczek (POL); L 2–5	Did not advance					11
