= Sambo at the 2019 European Games – Women's 60 kg =

Women's 60 kg at the 2019 European Games
- Venue: Minsk Sports Palace
- Date: 23 June
- Competitors: 8 from 8 nations

Medalists
gold medal	Vera Harelikava	Belarus
silver medal	Sabina Artemciuc	Moldova
bronze medal	Yana Kostenko	Russia
bronze medal	Yaiza Jiménez	Spain

The women's 60 kg sambo event at the 2019 European Games in Minsk was held on 23 June at the Minsk Sports Palace.

== Results ==
Legend

- VS – Total victory by decisive superiority
- VH – Total victory – painful hold

Quarterfinals
Salome Abashidze (GEO)	0
Sabina Artemciuc (MDA)	1
Yaiza Jiménez (ESP)	1
Anastasiia Shevchenko (UKR)	0
Yana Kostenko (RUS)	9^{VS}
Anna Ovtsarenko (EST)	0
Codrina Ionescu (ROU)	0
Vera Harelikava (BLR)	1^{VH}

Semifinals
Sabina Artemciuc (MDA)	1
Yaiza Jiménez (ESP)	0
Yana Kostenko (RUS)	2
Vera Harelikava (BLR)	3

Final
Sabina Artemciuc (MDA)	0
Vera Harelikava (BLR)	1^{VH}

Repechage

Repechage
Salome Abashidze (GEO)	0
Anastasiia Shevchenko (UKR)	1^{VH}

Third place
Anastasiia Shevchenko (UKR)	0
Yana Kostenko (RUS)	2

Repechage
Anna Ovtsarenko (EST)	0
Codrina Ionescu (ROU)	1^{VH}

Third place
Codrina Ionescu (ROU)	1
Yaiza Jiménez (ESP)	1
