= Archery at the 2019 European Games – Mixed team recurve =

Mixed team recurve at the 2019 European Games
- Venue: Olympic Sports Complex
- Date: 21, 23 June
- Competitors: 50 from 25 nations

Medalists
gold medal	Lucilla Boari; Mauro Nespoli	Italy
silver medal	Naomi Folkard; Patrick Huston	Great Britain
bronze medal	Michelle Kroppen; Cedric Rieger	Germany

The mixed team recurve competition at the 2019 European Games was held on 21 and 23 June 2019 at the Olympic Sports Complex in Minsk, Belarus.

48 archers promoted from the individual ranking round.

== Records ==
Prior to the competition, the existing world, European and Games records were as follows:

World record	South Korea (KOR); Choi Mi-sun; Lee Woo-seok	1368	Shanghai, China	7 May 2019

== Ranking round ==
Rank	Nation	Archer	Score	10s	Xs
1	Netherlands	Sjef van den Berg	1345 GR	63	26
1	Netherlands	Gabriela Bayardo	1345 GR	63	26
2	France	Puerre Plihon	1335	63	22
2	France	Audrey Adiceom	1335	63	22
3	Turkey	Mete Gazoz	1330	66	28
3	Turkey	Yasemin Anagöz	1330	66	28
4	Italy	Mauro Nespoli	1328	62	14
4	Italy	Lucilla Boari	1328	62	14
5	Russia	Galsan Bazarzhapov	1327	58	23
5	Russia	Ksenia Perova	1327	58	23
6	Spain	Pablo Acha	1319	57	16
6	Spain	Alicia Marín	1319	57	16
7	Great Britain	Patrick Huston	1308	53	15
7	Great Britain	Naomi Folkard	1308	53	15
8	Belarus	Kiryl Firsau	1304	47	19
8	Belarus	Karyna Kazlouskaya	1304	47	19
9	Moldova	Dan Olaru	1303	51	13
9	Moldova	Alexandra Mîrca	1303	51	13
10	Ukraine	Yuriy Havelko	1303	50	15
10	Ukraine	Veronika Marchenko	1303	50	15
11	Germany	Cedric Rieger	1291	40	12
11	Germany	Michelle Kroppen	1291	40	12
12	Sweden	Ludvig Flink	1287	40	15
12	Sweden	Christine Bjerendal	1287	40	15
13	Austria	Andreas Gstöttner	1264	45	25
13	Austria	Elisabeth Straka	1264	45	25
14	Finland	Samuli Piippo	1264	38	13
14	Finland	Taru Kuoppa	1264	38	13
15	Greece	Alexandros Karageorgiou	1254	41	12
15	Greece	Evangelia Psarra	1254	41	12
16	Poland	Kacper Sierakowski	1253	32	12
16	Poland	Sylwia Zyzańska	1253	32	12
17	Georgia	Jaba Moseshvili	1250	35	6
17	Georgia	Tsiko Putkaradze	1250	35	6
18	Croatia	Matija Mihalić	1243	31	14
18	Croatia	Tihana Kovačić	1243	31	14
19	Estonia	Mart Oona	1239	30	7
19	Estonia	Laura Numsalu	1239	30	7
20	Slovenia	Rok Bizjak	1237	34	12
20	Slovenia	Ana Umer	1237	34	12
21	Belgium	Jarno De Smrdt	1228	30	7
21	Belgium	Charlotte Destrooper	1228	30	7
22	Cyprus	Mimis El Helali	1224	27	5
22	Cyprus	Mikaella Kourouna	1224	27	5
23	Slovakia	Vladimír Hurban	1219	23	7
23	Slovakia	Danisa Baránková	1219	23	7
24	Switzerland	Florian Faber	1205	36	7
24	Switzerland	Iliana Deineko	1205	36	7
25	Bulgaria	Ivan Banchev	1202	31	7
25	Bulgaria	Dobromira Danailova	1202	31	7

== Elimination round ==
=== Finals ===
Semifinals
8	Belarus	2	34	35	39	31
4	Italy	6	38	37	37	38
11	Germany	4	34	36	36	37	17
7	Great Britain	5	38	32	38	35	17*

Final
4	Italy	5	39	37	35
7	Great Britain	1	36	37	30
Third place
8	Belarus	2	35	34	33	36
11	Germany	6	32	38	37	38

=== Top half ===
Round of 24
17	Georgia	5	33	35	36
16	Poland	1	33	33	33
9	Moldova	6	36	35	34
24	Switzerland	0	30	34	29
21	Belgium	2	39	35	39	34
12	Sweden	6	38	38	40	37
13	Austria	5	30	36	34	39	16
20	Slovenia	4	35	32	35	37	10

Round of 16
1	Netherlands	5	37	37	39	34	19
17	Georgia	4	38	39	38	33	18
9	Moldova	2	36	34	35	34
8	Belarus	6	35	35	36	36
5	Russia	5	36	35	38
12	Sweden	1	32	35	36
13	Austria	0	36	34	35
4	Italy	6	37	37	37

Quarterfinals
1	Netherlands	3	35	37	35	37
8	Belarus	5	31	37	38	38
5	Russia	4	33	37	38	35	17
4	Italy	5	35	36	34	37	19

Semifinals
8	Belarus	2	34	35	39	31
4	Italy	6	38	37	37	38

=== Bottom half ===
Round of 24
19	Estonia	0	31	35	34
14	Finland	6	36	36	37
11	Germany	6	39	37	34
22	Cyprus	0	36	36	33
23	Slovakia	0	35	35	37
10	Ukraine	6	37	37	38
15	Greece	2	30	32	36	34
18	Croatia	6	34	34	34	35

Round of 16
3	Turkey	5	38	37	36
14	Finland	1	37	34	36
11	Germany	6	36	37	40	37
6	Spain	2	33	38	36	35
7	Great Britain	5	36	35	38	39
10	Ukraine	3	35	37	38	34
18	Croatia	1	36	34	36
2	France	5	36	36	38

Quarterfinals
3	Turkey	0	31	33	34
11	Germany	6	35	35	38
7	Great Britain	6	37	33	36
2	France	0	34	26	34

Semifinals
11	Germany	4	34	36	36	37	17
7	Great Britain	5	38	32	38	35	17*
