= Badminton at the 2019 European Games – Mixed doubles =

Badminton's mixed doubles at the 2019 European Games
- Venue: Falcon Club
- Dates: 24–30 June
- Competitors: 32 from 15 nations

Medalists
gold medal	Marcus Ellis; Lauren Smith	Great Britain
silver medal	Chris Adcock; Gabby Adcock	Great Britain
bronze medal	Sam Magee; Chloe Magee	Ireland
bronze medal	Thom Gicquel; Delphine Delrue	France

The badminton mixed doubles tournament at the 2019 European Games was held from 24 to 30 June at Falcon Club.

== Competition format ==
The doubles tournament is played with 16 pairs, initially playing in four groups of four, before the top two from each group qualifies for an 8-pair knock-out stage.

=== Schedule ===
All times are in FET (UTC+03).

Start time	Session
24 June, 9:00	Group stage, matchday 1
25 June, 9:00	Group stage, matchday 2
27 June, 10:00	Group stage, matchday 3
28 June, 10:00	Quarter-finals
29 June, 10:00	Semi-finals
30 June, 12:00	Final

== Seeds ==
Seeds for all badminton events at the 2nd European Games were announced on 29 May.

1. Chris Adcock / Gabby Adcock (GBR) (silver medal)
2. Marcus Ellis / Lauren Smith (GBR) (gold medal)
3. Mark Lamsfuß / Isabel Herttrich (GER) (quarterfinals)
4. Thom Gicquel / Delphine Delrue (FRA) (bronze medal)

== Results ==
The group stage draws was held on 4 June.

=== Group stage ===
==== Group A ====
Pos	Team	Pld	W	L	GF	GA	GD	PF	PA	PD	Qualification
1	Chris Adcock / Gabby Adcock (GBR) [1]	3	3	0	6	0	+6	126	88	+38	Qualification to knock-out stage
2	Alex Vlaar / Mariya Mitsova (BUL)	3	2	1	4	4	0	151	153	−2	Qualification to knock-out stage
3	Oliver Schaller / Céline Burkart (SUI)	3	1	2	3	5	−2	140	157	−17	
4	Jakub Bitman / Alžběta Bášová (CZE)	3	0	3	2	6	−4	141	160	−19	

Source: TS

Date		Score		Set 1	Set 2	Set 3
24 June; 09:00	Alex Vlaar (Bulgaria); Mariya Mitsova (Bulgaria)	2–1	(Czech Republic) Jakub Bitman (Czech Republic) Alžběta Bášová	21–18	18–21	21–16
24 June; 10:20	Chris Adcock (United Kingdom); Gabby Adcock (United Kingdom)	2–0	(Switzerland) Oliver Schaller (Switzerland) Céline Burkart	21–13	21–13	
25 June; 09:40	Chris Adcock (United Kingdom); Gabby Adcock (United Kingdom)	2–0	(Bulgaria) Alex Vlaar (Bulgaria) Mariya Mitsova	21–14	21–18	
25 June; 09:40	Oliver Schaller (Switzerland); Céline Burkart (Switzerland)	2–1	(Czech Republic) Jakub Bitman (Czech Republic) Alžběta Bášová	16–21	21–19	21–16
27 June; 10:00	Chris Adcock (United Kingdom); Gabby Adcock (United Kingdom)	2–0	(Czech Republic) Jakub Bitman (Czech Republic) Alžběta Bášová	21–17	21–13	
27 June; 10:40	Oliver Schaller (Switzerland); Céline Burkart (Switzerland)	1–2	(Bulgaria) Alex Vlaar (Bulgaria) Mariya Mitsova	21–17	19–21	16–21

==== Group B ====
Pos	Team	Pld	W	L	GF	GA	GD	PF	PA	PD	Qualification
1	Marcus Ellis / Lauren Smith (GBR) [2]	3	3	0	6	0	+6	126	63	+63	Qualification to knock-out stage
2	Niclas Nøhr / Sara Thygesen (DEN)	3	2	1	4	2	+2	105	84	+21	Qualification to knock-out stage
3	Alberto Zapico / Lorena Uslé (ESP)	3	1	2	2	4	−2	78	112	−34	
4	Valeriy Atrashchenkov / Yelyzaveta Zharka (UKR)	3	0	3	0	6	−6	77	127	−50	

Source: TS

Date		Score		Set 1	Set 2	Set 3
24 June; 09:45	Marcus Ellis (United Kingdom); Lauren Smith (United Kingdom)	2–0	(Denmark) Niclas Nøhr (Denmark) Sara Thygesen	21–14	21–6	
24 June; 18:30	Alberto Zapico (Spain); Lorena Uslé (Spain)	2–0	(Ukraine) Valeriy Atrashchenkov (Ukraine) Yelyzaveta Zharka	21–10	21–18	
25 June; 18:00	Marcus Ellis (United Kingdom); Lauren Smith (United Kingdom)	2–0	(Spain) Alberto Zapico (Spain) Lorena Uslé	21–12	21–13	
25 June; 18:40	Niclas Nøhr (Denmark); Sara Thygesen (Denmark)	2–0	(Ukraine) Valeriy Atrashchenkov (Ukraine) Yelyzaveta Zharka	21–11	22–20	
27 June; 10:40	Marcus Ellis (United Kingdom); Lauren Smith (United Kingdom)	2–0	(Ukraine) Valeriy Atrashchenkov (Ukraine) Yelyzaveta Zharka	21–14	21–4	
27 June; 11:20	Niclas Nøhr (Denmark); Sara Thygesen (Denmark)	2–0	(Spain) Alberto Zapico (Spain) Lorena Uslé	21–4	21–7	

==== Group C ====
Pos	Team	Pld	W	L	GF	GA	GD	PF	PA	PD	Qualification
1	Robin Tabeling / Selena Piek (NED)	2	2	0	4	1	+3	99	78	+21	Qualification to knock-out stage
2	Mark Lamsfuß / Isabel Herttrich (GER) [3]	2	1	1	2	2	0	67	73	−6	Qualification to knock-out stage
3	Paweł Śmiłowski / Magdalena Świerczyńska (POL)	2	0	2	1	4	−3	84	99	−15	
—	Misha Zilberman / Svetlana Zilberman (ISR)	0	0	0	0	0	0	0	0	0	Retired

Source: TS

Date		Score		Set 1	Set 2	Set 3
24 June; 12:00	Mark Lamsfuß (Germany); Isabel Herttrich (Germany)	2–0	(Poland) Paweł Śmiłowski (Poland) Magdalena Świerczyńska	21–16	21–15	
24 June; 19:00	Robin Tabeling (Netherlands); Selena Piek (Netherlands)	~~2–0~~	(Israel) Misha Zilberman (Israel) Svetlana Zilberman	~~21–10~~	~~21–10~~	
25 June; 09:00	Paweł Śmiłowski (Poland); Magdalena Świerczyńska (Poland)	~~2–0~~	(Israel) Misha Zilberman (Israel) Svetlana Zilberman	~~21–16~~	~~21–15~~	
25 June; 09:45	Mark Lamsfuß (Germany); Isabel Herttrich (Germany)	0–2	(Netherlands) Robin Tabeling (Netherlands) Selena Piek	17–21	8–21	
27 June; 10:00	Mark Lamsfuß (Germany); Isabel Herttrich (Germany)	w/o	(Israel) Misha Zilberman (Israel) Svetlana Zilberman			
27 June; 11:20	Paweł Śmiłowski (Poland); Magdalena Świerczyńska (Poland)	1–2	(Netherlands) Robin Tabeling (Netherlands) Selena Piek	12–21	21–14	20–22

==== Group D ====
Pos	Team	Pld	W	L	GF	GA	GD	PF	PA	PD	Qualification
1	Thom Gicquel / Delphine Delrue (FRA) [4]	3	3	0	6	2	+4	165	128	+37	Qualification to knock-out stage
2	Sam Magee / Chloe Magee (IRL)	3	2	1	5	3	+2	157	137	+20	Qualification to knock-out stage
3	Evgenij Dremin / Evgenia Dimova (RUS)	3	1	2	4	4	0	148	141	+7	
4	Aleksei Konakh / Kristina Silich (BLR)	3	0	3	0	6	−6	62	126	−64	

Source: TS

Date		Score		Set 1	Set 2	Set 3
24 June; 18:15	Thom Gicquel (France); Delphine Delrue (France)	2–0	(Belarus) Aleksei Konakh (Belarus) Kristina Silich	21–15	21–5	
24 June; 19:45	Sam Magee (Republic of Ireland); Chloe Magee (Republic of Ireland)	2–1	(Russia) Evgenij Dremin (Russia) Evgenia Dimova	16–21	21–19	21–15
25 June; 09:00	Thom Gicquel (France); Delphine Delrue (France)	2–1	(Republic of Ireland) Sam Magee (Republic of Ireland) Chloe Magee	20–22	21–19	21–16
25 June; 12:00	Aleksei Konakh (Belarus); Kristina Silich (Belarus)	0–2	(Russia) Evgenij Dremin (Russia) Evgenia Dimova	8–21	14–21	
27 June; 10:00	Aleksei Konakh (Belarus); Kristina Silich (Belarus)	0–2	(Republic of Ireland) Sam Magee (Republic of Ireland) Chloe Magee	9–21	11–21	
27 June; 10:45	Thom Gicquel (France); Delphine Delrue (France)	2–1	(Russia) Evgenij Dremin (Russia) Evgenia Dimova	19–21	21–11	21–19

=== Knock-out stage ===
Quarterfinals
1	Chris Adcock (GBR); Gabby Adcock (GBR)	21	19	21
Niclas Nøhr (DEN); Sara Thygesen (DEN)	15	21	15
Robin Tabeling (NED); Selena Piek (NED)	19	17
Sam Magee (IRL); Chloe Magee (IRL)	21	21
Alex Vlaar (BUL); Mariya Mitsova (BUL)	17	15
4	Thom Gicquel (FRA); Delphine Delrue (FRA)	21	21
3	Mark Lamsfuß (GER); Isabel Herttrich (GER)	22	11
2	Marcus Ellis (GBR); Lauren Smith (GBR)	24	21

Semifinals
1	Chris Adcock (GBR); Gabby Adcock (GBR)	21	21
Sam Magee (IRL); Chloe Magee (IRL)	8	18
4	Thom Gicquel (FRA); Delphine Delrue (FRA)	19	12
2	Marcus Ellis (GBR); Lauren Smith (GBR)	21	21

Final
1	Chris Adcock (GBR); Gabby Adcock (GBR)	14	9
2	Marcus Ellis (GBR); Lauren Smith (GBR)	21	21
