= Bulgaria at the 2019 European Games =

- IOC code: BUL
- NOC: Bulgarian Olympic Committee
- Website: www.bgolympic.org

in Minsk, Belarus 21 – 30 June 2019
- Competitors: 87 in 12 sports
- Medals Ranked 16th: Gold 3 Silver 7 Bronze 8 Total 18

European Games appearances (overview)
- 2015; 2019; 2023; 2027

Bulgaria competed in the 2019 European Games, in Minsk, Belarus from 21 to 30 June 2019. Bulgaria had previously competed at the 2015 European Games in Baku, Azerbaijan, where it won 10 medals, including one golds.

== Archery ==
Recurve

Athlete	Event	Ranking round		Round of 64	Round of 32	Round of 16	Quarterfinals	Semifinals	Final / BM	
Athlete	Event	Score	Seed	Opposition Score	Opposition Score	Opposition Score	Opposition Score	Opposition Score	Opposition Score	Rank
Ivan Banchev	Men's individual	635	39	Banda (HUN); L 2-6	Did not advance					
Debromira Danailova	Women's individual	567	46	Landi (ITA); L 1-7	Did not advance					
Ivan Banchev; Debromira Danailova	Mixed team	1202	25	—	Did not advance					25

== Badminton ==
Athletes	Event	Group stage				Round of 16	Quarterfinals	Semifinals	Final	Rank
Athletes	Event	Opposition Score	Opposition Score	Opposition Score	Rank	Opposition Score	Opposition Score	Opposition Score	Opposition Score	Rank
Daniel Nikolov	Men's singles	Nguyen (IRL); L 0–2	Wraber (AUT); L 1–2	Abián (ESP); L 1–2	4	Did not advance				
Linda Zetchiri	Women's singles	Yiğit (TUR); L 0–2	Kuuba (EST); L 0–2	Ulitina (UKR); W 2-1	3	Did not advance				
Alex Vlaar; Dimitar Yanakiev	Men's doubles	Beketov / Makhnovskiy (UKR); W 2–0	Birker / Stipsits (AUT); W 2–0	Lamsfuß / Seidel (GER); L 0-2	2 Q	—	Ivanov / Sozonov (RUS); L 0-2	Did not advance		
Alex Vlaar; Mariya Mitsova	Mixed doubles	Bitman / Bášová (CZE); W 2–1	Adcock / Adcock (GBR); L 0–2	Schaller / Burkart (SUI); W 2–1	2 Q	—	Gicquel / Delrue (FRA); L 0–2	Did not advance		
