= Switzerland at the 2019 European Games =

- IOC code: SUI
- NOC: Swiss Olympic Association
- Website: www.swissolympic.ch

in Minsk, Belarus 21 – 30 June 2019
- Competitors: 81 in 14 sports
- Medals Ranked 18th: Gold 3 Silver 3 Bronze 4 Total 10

European Games appearances (overview)
- 2015; 2019; 2023; 2027

Switzerland competed at the 2019 European Games, in Minsk, Belarus from 21 to 30 June 2019. Switzerland has previously competed at the 2015 European Games in Baku, Azerbaijan, where it won 15 medals, including seven golds.

== Archery ==
Recurve

Athlete	Event	Ranking round		Round of 64	Round of 32	Round of 16	Quarterfinals	Semifinals	Final / BM	
Athlete	Event	Score	Seed	Opposition Score	Opposition Score	Opposition Score	Opposition Score	Opposition Score	Opposition Score	Rank
Florian Faber	Men's individual	661	16	Bye						
Iliana Deineko	Women's individual	544	47	Marchenko (UKR)						
Florian Faber; Iliana Deineko	Mixed team	1205	24	—	Moldova; L 0–6	Did not advance				17

== Badminton ==
Athletes	Event	Group stage				Round of 16	Quarterfinals	Semifinals	Final	Rank
Athletes	Event	Opposition Score	Opposition Score	Opposition Score	Rank	Opposition Score	Opposition Score	Opposition Score	Opposition Score	Rank
Christian Kirchmayr	Men's singles	Leverdez (FRA)	Gunnarsson (ISL)	Milić (SRB)						
Sabrina Jaquet	Women's singles	Birch (GBR)	Gonçalves (POR)	Salehar (SLO)						
Oliver Schaller; Céline Burkart	Mixed doubles	Adcock / Adcock (GBR)	Vlaar / Mitsova (BUL)	Bitman / Bášová (CZE)		—				
