= Ronaldas Račinskas =

Lithuanian sport shooter (born 1968)

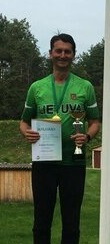
- Lithuanian Shotgun Cup 2021 Final Stage in Vilnius

Personal information
- Born: 13 May 1968 (age 57) Vilnius, Lithuanian SSR, Soviet Union

Ronaldas Račinskas (born 13 May 1968) is a Lithuanian shotgun shooter.

He is a multiple Lithuanian champion in skeet, double trap and trap events. National record holder. In 2016 he was selected to represent Lithuania in 2016 Summer Olympics.
