= Emin Jafarov =

Azerbaijani sport shooter

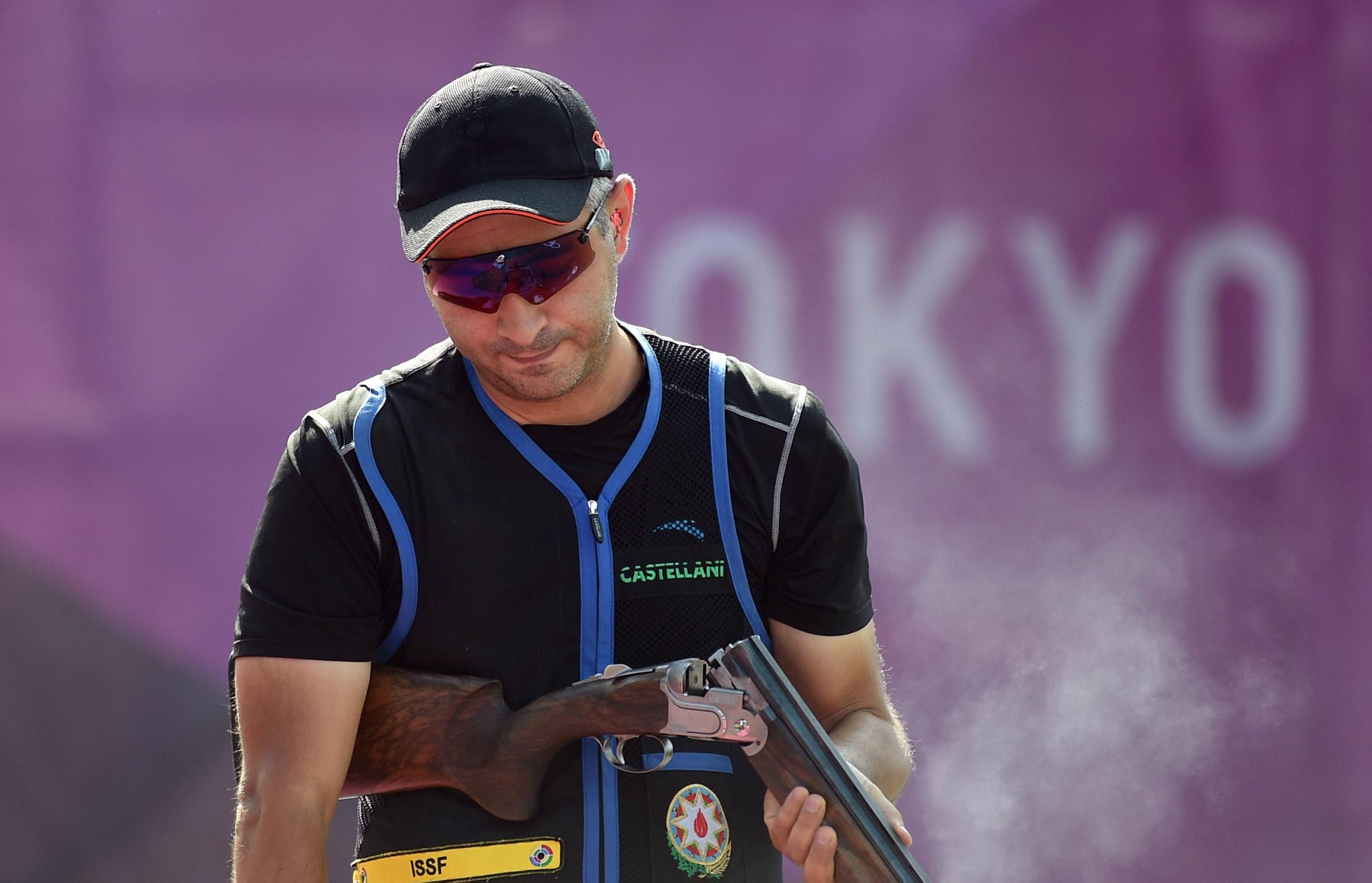

Personal information
- Nationality: Azerbaijan
- Born: 12 October 1979 (age 46) Baku, Azerbaijan

Sport
- Sport: Shooting

Emin Jafarov (born 12 October 1979) is an Azerbaijani sport shooter. He competed in the 2020 Summer Olympics.
