= Delphine Delrue =

French badminton player (born 1998)

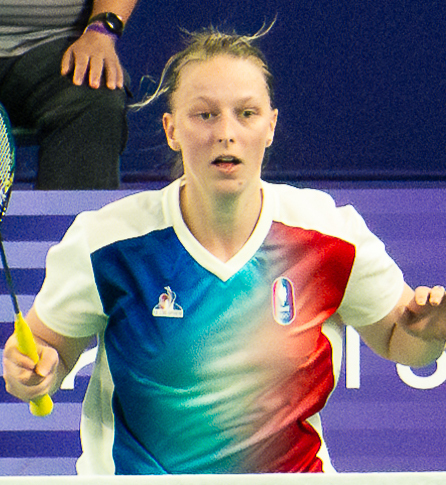
- Delrue in 2024

Personal information
- Born: Delphine Aurore Delrue; 6 November 1998 (age 28) Sarcelles, France
- Years active: Right
- Height: 1.70 m (5 ft 7 in)
- Weight: 62 kg (137 lb)

Sport
- Country: France
- Sport: Badminton

Women's & mixed doubles
- Highest ranking: 3 (XD with Thom Gicquel, 27 October 2026); 27 (WD with Léa Palermo, 5 March 2019)
- Current ranking: 3 (XD with Thom Gicquel, 3 November 2026)
- BWF profile
Medal record
Women's badminton
Representing France
World Championships
Gold medal – first place	2026 New Delhi	Mixed doubles
Bronze medal – third place	2025 Paris	Mixed doubles
European Games
Silver medal – second place	2023 Kraków-Małopolska	Mixed doubles
Bronze medal – third place	2019 Minsk	Mixed doubles
European Championships
Gold medal – first place	2024 Saarbrücken	Mixed doubles
Silver medal – second place	2022 Madrid	Mixed doubles
Silver medal – second place	2025 Horsens	Mixed doubles
European Women's Team Championships
Bronze medal – third place	2020 Liévin	Women's team
Bronze medal – third place	2024 Łódź	Women's team
European Mixed Team Championships
Silver medal – second place	2021 Vantaa	Mixed team
Silver medal – second place	2023 Aire-sur-la-Lys	Mixed team
Silver medal – second place	2025 Baku	Mixed team
Mediterranean Games
Gold medal – first place	2018 Tarragona	Women's doubles
European Junior Championships
Gold medal – first place	2017 Mulhouse	Mixed team
Bronze medal – third place	2015 Lubin	Mixed team

Delphine Aurore Delrue (born 6 November 1998) is a French badminton player. Delrue started playing badminton at aged seven, and she affiliate with the USEE Badminton club in 2006. Delrue was selected to join the national team in INSEP in 2016. In 2015, she became the runner-up of European University Championships in the women's doubles and mixed doubles events. In 2016, she won French National Badminton Championships in the women's doubles event with her partner Léa Palermo. She also the runner-up at the Orléans International in the women's doubles event and Swiss International in the mixed doubles event. In 2017, she became the runner-up at the Estonian International partnered with Léa Palermo. She competed at the 2018 Mediterranean Games, clinched the women's doubles gold with Palermo. In 2019, she captured a bronze medal at the European Games in the mixed doubles event with Thom Gicquel. Delrue and Gicquel reached a career high as world number 10 in the BWF World ranking on 9 March 2021. She competed at the 2020 Summer Olympics.

== Achievements ==
=== BWF World Championships ===
Mixed doubles
Year	Venue	Partner	Opponent	Score	Result	Ref.
2025	Adidas Arena, Paris, France	(France) Thom Gicquel	(Malaysia) Chen Tang Jie (Malaysia) Toh Ee Wei	18–21, 16–21	Bronze	
2026	Indira Gandhi Arena, New Delhi, India	(France) Thom Gicquel	(China) Feng Yanzhe (China) Huang Dongping	22–20, 19–21, 21–15	Gold	

=== European Games ===
Mixed doubles
Year	Venue	Partner	Opponent	Score	Result
2019	Falcon Club, Minsk, Belarus	(France) Thom Gicquel	(United Kingdom) Marcus Ellis (United Kingdom) Lauren Smith	19–21, 12–21	Bronze
2023	Arena Jaskółka, Tarnów, Poland	(France) Thom Gicquel	(Netherlands) Robin Tabeling (Netherlands) Selena Piek	10–21, 21–13, 13–21	Silver

=== European Championships ===
Mixed doubles
Year	Venue	Partner	Opponent	Score	Result
2022	Polideportivo Municipal Gallur, Madrid, Spain	(France) Thom Gicquel	(Germany) Mark Lamsfuß (Germany) Isabel Lohau	21–16, 20–22, 16–21	Silver
2024	Saarlandhalle, Saarbrücken, Germany	(France) Thom Gicquel	(Denmark) Mathias Christiansen (Denmark) Alexandra Bøje	21–16, 21–15	Gold
2025	Forum, Horsens, Germany	(France) Thom Gicquel	(Denmark) Jesper Toft (Denmark) Amalie Magelund	18–21, 19–21	Silver

=== Mediterranean Games ===
Women's doubles
Year	Venue	Partner	Opponent	Score	Result
2018	El Morell Pavilion, Tarragona, Spain	(France) Léa Palermo	(Turkey) Bengisu Erçetin (Turkey) Nazlıcan İnci	21–17, 21–16	Gold

=== BWF World Tour (5 titles, 11 runners-up) ===
The BWF World Tour, which was announced on 19 March 2017 and implemented in 2018, is a series of elite badminton tournaments sanctioned by the Badminton World Federation (BWF). The BWF World Tour is divided into levels of World Tour Finals, Super 1000, Super 750, Super 500, Super 300 (part of the HSBC World Tour), and the BWF Tour Super 100.

Women's doubles
Year	Tournament	Level	Partner	Opponent	Score	Result
2018	Orléans Masters	Super 100	(France) Léa Palermo	(Bulgaria) Gabriela Stoeva (Bulgaria) Stefani Stoeva	8–21, 14–21	(silver) Runner-up

Mixed doubles
Year	Tournament	Level	Partner	Opponent	Score	Result
2018	Dutch Open	Super 100	(France) Thom Gicquel	(England) Marcus Ellis (England) Lauren Smith	15–21, 15–21	(silver) Runner-up
2019	Orléans Masters	Super 100	(France) Thom Gicquel	(France) Ronan Labar (France) Anne Tran	21–11, 21–14	(gold) Winner
2019	U.S. Open	Super 300	(France) Thom Gicquel	(Chinese Taipei) Lee Jhe-huei (Chinese Taipei) Hsu Ya-ching	17–21, 17–21	(silver) Runner-up
2020	Spain Masters	Super 300	(France) Thom Gicquel	(South Korea) Kim Sa-rang (South Korea) Kim Ha-na	21–15, 11–21, 10–21	(silver) Runner-up
2021	Swiss Open	Super 300	(France) Thom Gicquel	(Denmark) Mathias Christiansen (Denmark) Alexandra Bøje	21–19, 21–19	(gold) Winner
2022	Indonesia Masters	Super 500	(France) Thom Gicquel	(China) Zheng Siwei (China) Huang Yaqiong	13–21, 14–21	(silver) Runner-up
2023	China Open	Super 1000	(France) Thom Gicquel	(South Korea) Seo Seung-jae (South Korea) Chae Yoo-jung	19–21, 12–21	(silver) Runner-up
2024	Japan Masters	Super 500	(France) Thom Gicquel	(Thailand) Dechapol Puavaranukroh (Thailand) Supissara Paewsampran	16–21, 21–10, 17–21	(silver) Runner-up
2025	India Open	Super 750	(France) Thom Gicquel	(China) Jiang Zhenbang (China) Wei Yaxin	18–21, 17–21	(silver) Runner-up
2025	Indonesia Open	Super 1000	(France) Thom Gicquel	(Thailand) Dechapol Puavaranukroh (Thailand) Supissara Paewsampran	21–16, 21–18	(gold) Winner
2025	Hylo Open	Super 500	(France) Thom Gicquel	(Denmark) Mathias Christiansen (Denmark) Alexandra Bøje	21–23, 15–21	(silver) Runner-up
2025	Japan Masters	Super 500	(France) Thom Gicquel	(Thailand) Dechapol Puavaranukroh (Thailand) Supissara Paewsampran	18–21, 21–14, 18–21	(silver) Runner-up
2026	All England Open	Super 1000	(France) Thom Gicquel	(Chinese Taipei) Ye Hong-wei (Chinese Taipei) Nicole Gonzales Chan	19–21, 18–21	(silver) Runner-up
2026	Orléans Masters	Super 300	(France) Thom Gicquel	(Denmark) Mathias Christiansen (Denmark) Alexandra Bøje	21–19, 21–13	(gold) Winner
2026	Hylo Open	Super 500	(France) Thom Gicquel	(Denmark) Jesper Toft (Denmark) Amalie Cecille Kudsk	19–21, 22–20, 21–18	(gold) Winner

=== BWF International Challenge/Series (5 titles, 9 runners-up) ===
Women's doubles
Year	Tournament	Partner	Opponent	Score	Result
2016	Orléans International	(France) Léa Palermo	(England) Heather Olver (England) Lauren Smith	19–21, 8–21	(silver) Runner-up
2017	Estonian International	(France) Léa Palermo	(Bulgaria) Mariya Mitsova (Bulgaria) Petya Nedelcheva	12–21, 16–21	(silver) Runner-up
2017	Orléans International	(France) Léa Palermo	(Japan) Asumi Kugo (Japan) Megumi Yokoyama	14–21, 21–17, 12–21	(silver) Runner-up
2017	White Nights	(France) Léa Palermo	(Russia) Anastasia Chervyakova (Russia) Olga Morozova	8–21, 15–21	(silver) Runner-up
2018	Spanish International	(France) Léa Palermo	(Ukraine) Maryna Ilyinskaya (Ukraine) Yelyzaveta Zharka	21–6, 21–12	(gold) Winner
2018	Belgian International	(France) Léa Palermo	(Japan) Mizuki Fujii (Japan) Nao Ono	21–19, 21–14	(gold) Winner
2019	Irish Open	(France) Léa Palermo	(Denmark) Amalie Magelund (Denmark) Freja Ravn	18–21, 11–21	(silver) Runner-up

Mixed doubles
Year	Tournament	Partner	Opponent	Score	Result
2016	Swiss International	(France) Thom Gicquel	(Switzerland) Oliver Schaller (Switzerland) Céline Burkart	17–21, 21–10, 19–21	(silver) Runner-up
2017	Portugal International	(France) Thom Gicquel	(Finland) Anton Kaisti (Finland) Jenny Nyström	21–19, 19–21, 12–21	(silver) Runner-up
2018	Swedish Open	(France) Thom Gicquel	(Denmark) Kristoffer Knudsen (Denmark) Isabella Nielsen	21–16, 21–10	(gold) Winner
2018	Dutch International	(France) Thom Gicquel	(Denmark) Mathias Thyrri (Denmark) Elisa Melgaard	21–17, 21–14	(gold) Winner
2019	Polish Open	(France) Thom Gicquel	(England) Ben Lane (England) Jessica Pugh	17–21, 15–21	(silver) Runner-up
2019	Denmark International	(France) Thom Gicquel	(France) Ronan Labar (France) Anne Tran	21–19, 18–21, 15–21	(silver) Runner-up
2019	Azerbaijan International	(France) Thom Gicquel	(Germany) Mark Lamsfuß (Germany) Isabel Herttrich	9–21, 23–21, 21–15	(gold) Winner

BWF International Challenge tournament
BWF International Series tournament
BWF Future Series tournament
