= Jeremy Bird (sport shooter) =

British sport shooter (born 1989)

Jeremy Harry Bird
Personal information
- Nationality: British
- Born: 14 September 1989 (age 36)

Sport
- Country: United Kingdom
- Sport: Shooting
- Event: Skeet
Medal record
Men's shooting
Representing Great Britain
World Championships
Bronze medal – third place	2019 Lonato del Garda	Skeet

Jeremy Harry Bird (born 14 September 1989) is a British sport shooter. He participated at the 2019 World Shotgun Championships, where he won skeet bronze.
