= Italy at the 2019 European Games =

- IOC code: ITA
- NOC: Italian National Olympic Committee
- Website: www.coni.it

in Minsk, Belarus 21 – 30 June 2019
- Competitors: 187 in 15 sports
- Flag bearer: Clemente Russo (boxing)
- Medals Ranked 4th: Gold 13 Silver 15 Bronze 13 Total 41

European Games appearances (overview)
- 2015; 2019; 2023; 2027

Italy competed at the 2019 European Games, in Minsk, Belarus from 21 to 30 June 2019. Italy has previously competed at the 2015 European Games in Baku, Azerbaijan, where it won 47 medals, including ten golds.

== Archery ==
Recurve

Athlete	Event	Ranking round		Round of 64	Round of 32	Round of 16	Quarterfinals	Semifinals	Final / BM	
Athlete	Event	Score	Seed	Opposition Score	Opposition Score	Opposition Score	Opposition Score	Opposition Score	Opposition Score	Rank
Mauro Nespoli	Men's individual	678	4	Bye						
Marco Galiazzo	Men's individual	651	20	Oona (EST)						
David Pasqualucci	Men's individual	629	41	Wise (GBR)						
Lucilla Boari	Women's individual	650	6	Bye						
Tatiana Andreoli	Women's individual	645	12	Bye						
Vanessa Landi	Women's individual	631	19	Danailova (BUL)						
Mauro Nespoli; Marco Galiazzo; David Pasqualucci	Men's team	1958	5	—			Great Britain; W 5–1	France; L 0–6	BM; Spain; W 6–2	3rd place, bronze medalist(s)
Lucilla Boari; Tatiana Andreoli; Vanessa Landi	Women's team	1926	3	—			Germany; L 0–6	Did not advance		5
Mauro Nespoli; Lucilla Boari	Mixed team	1328	4	—	Bye	Austria; W 6–0	Russia			

Compound

Athlete	Event	Ranking round		Round of 16	Quarterfinals	Semifinals	Final / BM	
Athlete	Event	Score	Seed	Opposition Score	Opposition Score	Opposition Score	Opposition Score	Rank
Sergio Pagni	Men's individual	688	11	Deloche (FRA)				
Marcella Tonioli	Women's individual	694	8	Paas (EST); L 140(9)–140(X)	Did not advance			9
Sergio Pagni; Marcella Tonioli	Mixed team	1382	6	Bye	Croatia			

== Badminton ==
Athletes	Event	Group stage				Round of 16	Quarterfinals	Semifinals	Final	Rank
Athletes	Event	Opposition Score	Opposition Score	Opposition Score	Rank	Opposition Score	Opposition Score	Opposition Score	Opposition Score	Rank
Rosario Maddaloni	Men's singles	Zilberman (ISR)	Ivanič (SLO)	Heino (EST)						
Giovanni Greco; Kevin Strobl	Men's doubles	Astrup / Rasmussen (DEN)	Bochat / Cwalina (POL)	Mass / Tabeling (NED)		—				
Silvia Garino; Lisa Iversen	Women's doubles	Bolotova / Davletova (RUS)	Karlsson / Magnusson (SWE)	Ilyinska / Zharka (UKR)		—				
