= France at the 2019 European Games =

- IOC code: FRA
- NOC: French National Olympic and Sports Committee
- Website: www.franceolympique.com

in Minsk, Belarus 21 – 30 June 2019
- Competitors: 178 in 14 sports
- Flag bearer: Clarisse Agbegnenou (judo)
- Medals Ranked 8th: Gold 6 Silver 9 Bronze 13 Total 28

European Games appearances (overview)
- 2015; 2019; 2023; 2027

France competed at the 2019 European Games, in Minsk, Belarus from 21 to 30 June 2019. France has previously competed at the 2015 European Games in Baku, Azerbaijan, where it won 43 medals, including twelve golds.

== Medalists ==
Medal	Name	Sport	Event	Date
Gold	Thomas Chirault; Pierre Plihon; Jean-Charles Valladont	Archery	Men's team doubles	22 June
Gold	Clarisse Agbegnenou	Judo	Women's −63 kg	23 June
Gold	Margaux Pinot	Judo	Women's −70 kg	23 June
Gold	Léa Labrousse	Gymnastics	Women's individual trampoline	24 June
Gold	Mousdandy Djaldi-Tabdi; Caroline Hériaud; Assitan Koné; Johanna Tayeau	Basketball	Women's tournament	24 June
Gold	Maxime Beaumont	Canoe sprint	Men's K-1 200 metres	27 June
Silver	Jean Quiquampoix	Shooting	Men's 25 metre rapid fire pistol	26 June
Silver	Lucie Anastassiou	Shooting	Women's skeet	27 June
Silver	Grégory Baugé; Quentin Caleyron; Rayan Helal; Quentin Lafargue	Cycling	Men's team sprint	27 June
Silver	Lorette Charpy	Gymnastics	Women's artistic individual all-around	29 June
Silver	Mourad Aliev	Boxing	Men's +91 kg	29 June
Silver	Brice Leverdez	Badminton	Men's singles	30 June
Silver	Sofiane Oumiha	Boxing	Men's 64 kg	30 June
Silver	Mathilde Gros	Cycling	Women's sprint	30 June
Silver	Rayan Helal	Cycling	Men's keirin	30 June
Bronze	Laure Fournier	Sambo	Women's 56 kg	22 June
Bronze	Amandine Buchard	Judo	Women's −52 kg	22 June
Bronze	Madeleine Malonga	Judo	Women's −78 kg	24 June
Bronze	Cyrille Maret	Judo	Men's −100 kg	24 June
Bronze	Sébastien Martiny; Allan Morante	Gymnastics	Men's synchronized trampoline	24 June
Bronze	Amandine Buchard; Guillaume Chaine; Axel Clerget; Aurelien Diesse; Marie-Ève Gahié; Priscilla Gneto; Kilian Le Blouch; Madeleine Malonga; Cyrille Maret; Anne Fatoumata M'Bairo; Margaux Pinot	Judo	Mixed team	25 June
Bronze	Tristan Flore; Laura Gasnier	Table tennis	Mixed doubles	25 June
Bronze	Sophie Dodemont	Archery	Women's individual compound	26 June
Bronze	Clément Bessaguet	Shooting	Men's 25 metre rapid fire pistol	26 June
Bronze	Émilie Lefel; Anne Tran	Badminton	Women's doubles	28 June
Bronze	Thom Gicquel; Delphine Delrue	Badminton	Mixed doubles	29 June
Bronze	Sofia Bouderbane	Karate	Women's 50 kg	30 June
Bronze	Gwendoline Philippe	Karate	Women's 61 kg	30 June

Medals by sport
Sport	1st place, gold medalist(s)	2nd place, silver medalist(s)	3rd place, bronze medalist(s)	Total
Archery	1	0	1	2
Badminton	0	1	2	3
Basketball	1	0	0	1
Boxing	0	2	0	2
Canoe sprint	1	0	0	1
Cycling	0	3	0	3
Gymnastics	1	1	1	3
Judo	2	0	4	6
Sambo	0	0	1	1
Karate	0	0	2	2
Shooting	0	2	1	3
Table tennis	0	0	1	1
Total	6	9	13	28

Medals by date
Day	Date	1st place, gold medalist(s)	2nd place, silver medalist(s)	3rd place, bronze medalist(s)	Total
Day 1	22 June	1	0	2	3
Day 2	23 June	2	0	0	2
Day 3	24 June	2	0	3	5
Day 4	25 June	0	0	2	2
Day 5	26 June	0	1	2	3
Day 6	27 June	1	2	0	3
Day 7	28 June	0	0	1	1
Day 8	29 June	0	2	1	3
Day 9	30 June	0	4	2	6
Total		6	9	13	28

== Archery ==
Recurve

Athlete	Event	Ranking round		Round of 64	Round of 32	Round of 16	Quarterfinals	Semifinals	Final / BM	
Athlete	Event	Score	Seed	Opposition Score	Opposition Score	Opposition Score	Opposition Score	Opposition Score	Opposition Score	Rank
Pierre Plihon	Men's individual	684	2	Bye	Dalidovich (BLR); L 4–6	Did not advance				
Thomas Chirault	Men's individual	675	5	Bye	Rieger (GER); W 6–4	Valladont (FRA); L 0–6	Did not advance			
Jean-Charles Valladont	Men's individual	665	12	Bye	Firsau (BLR); W 6–2	Chirault (FRA); W 6–0	Nespoli (ITA); L 0–6	Did not advance		
Audrey Adiceom	Women's individual	651	5	Bye	Coşkun (TUR); W 6–4	Andreoli (ITA); L 5–6	Did not advance			
Pierre Plihon; Thomas Chirault; Jean-Charles Valladont	Men's team	2024 GR	1	—N/a			Luxembourg; W 3–2	Italy; W 6–0	Netherlands; W 5–4	1st place, gold medalist(s)
Pierre Plihon; Audrey Adiceom	Mixed team	1335	2	—N/a	Bye	Croatia; W 5–1	Great Britain; L 0–6	Did not advance		

Compound

Athlete	Event	Ranking round		Round of 16	Quarterfinals	Semifinals	Final / BM	
Athlete	Event	Score	Seed	Opposition Score	Opposition Score	Opposition Score	Opposition Score	Rank
Pierre-Julien Deloche	Men's individual	698	6	Pagni (ITA); W 143–143	Vavro (CRO); L 132–142	Did not advance		
Sophie Dodemont	Women's individual	697	3	Kuzniatsova (BLR); W 143–142	Jensen (DEN); W 143–142	Avdeeva (RUS); L 144–147	Bostan (TUR); W 148–142	3rd place, bronze medalist(s)
Pierre-Julien Deloche; Sophie Dodemont	Mixed team	1395	4	Bye	Turkey; L 148–151	Did not advance		

== Badminton ==
Athletes	Event	Group stage				Round of 16	Quarterfinals	Semifinals	Final	Rank
Athletes	Event	Opposition Score	Opposition Score	Opposition Score	Rank	Opposition Score	Opposition Score	Opposition Score	Opposition Score	Rank
Brice Leverdez	Men's singles	Milić (SRB); W 2–0	Gunnarsson (ISL); W 2–0	Kirchmayr (SUI); W 2–0	1 Q	Rogalski (POL); W 2–1	Malkov (RUS); W 2–0	Must (EST); W 2–0	Antonsen (DEN); L 1–2	2nd place, silver medalist(s)
Marie Batomene	Women's singles	Gilmour (GBR); L 0–2	Wiborg (NOR); W 2–0	Fomkinaitė (LTU); W 2–0	2 Q	Birch (GBR); L 0–2	Did not advance			
Thom Gicquel; Ronan Labar	Men's doubles	Ellis / Langridge (GBR); L 0–2	Magee / Reynolds (IRL); W 2–0	Kaljurand / Käsner (EST); W 2–0	2 Q	—N/a	Astrup / Rasmussen (DEN); L 1–2	Did not advance		
Émilie Lefel; Anne Tran	Women's doubles	Marran / Rüütel (EST); W 2–0	Jaques / Vandenhoucke (BEL); W 2–0	Cherniavskaya / Zaitsava (BLR); W 2–0	1 Q	—N/a	Karlsson / Magnusson (SWE); W 2–0	Birch / Smith (GBR); L 0–2	Did not advance	
Thom Gicquel; Delphine Delrue	Mixed doubles	Konakh / Silich (BLR); W 2–0	Magee / Magee (IRL); W 2–1	Dremin / Dimova (RUS); W 2–1	1 Q	—N/a	Vlaar / Mitsova (BUL); W 2–0	Ellis / Smith (GBR); L 0–2	Did not advance	

== Basketball 3x3 ==
Team	Event	Group stage				Quarterfinals	Semifinals	Final / BM	
Team	Event	Opposition Score	Opposition Score	Opposition Score	Rank	Opposition Score	Opposition Score	Opposition Score	Rank
Anthony Christophe; Thomas Cornely; Mike Joseph; Raphaël Wilson	Men's tournament	Russia; W 22–21	Ukraine; L 14–18	Italy; W 22–13	2 Q	Latvia; L 14–21	Did not advance		
Mousdandy Djaldi-Tabdi; Caroline Hériaud; Assitan Koné; Johanna Tayeau	Women's tournament	Netherlands; W 18–8	Switzerland; W 21–7	Andorra; W 20–9	1 Q	Russia; W 20–13	Germany; W 11–10	Estonia; W 21–8	1st place, gold medalist(s)
