= 2020 European Boxing Olympic Qualification Tournament =

Boxing competitions

- Venue: Copper Box Arena (2020); Le Grand Dôme (2021)
- Location: London, United Kingdom (2020); Villebon-sur-Yvette, France (2021)
- Dates: 14–16 March 2020; 4–8 June 2021
- Competitors: 316 from 43 nations

The 2020 European Boxing Olympic Qualification Tournament for boxing at the 2020 Summer Olympics began on 14 March 2020 at the Copper Box Arena in London. On 16 March, the tournament was suspended and postponed due to the COVID-19 pandemic. It was to resume on 22 April 2021 and end on 26 April, but after cases rose in the United Kingdom in January, it was moved from London and further postponed. The tournament later ran from 4 June to 8 June 2021 at Le Grand Dôme in Villebon-sur-Yvette, France. It was expected that spectators were not allowed to attend.

== Medalists ==
=== Men ===
Event	Gold	Silver	Bronze
−52 kg	Billal Bennama (FRA)	Galal Yafai (GBR)	Gabriel Escobar (ESP)
−52 kg	Billal Bennama (FRA)	Galal Yafai (GBR)	Batuhan Çiftçi (TUR)
−57 kg	Albert Batyrgaziev (RUS)	Samuel Kistohurry (FRA)	Mykola Butsenko (UKR)
−57 kg	Albert Batyrgaziev (RUS)	Samuel Kistohurry (FRA)	Roland Gálos (HUN)
−63 kg	Sofiane Oumiha (FRA)	Dzmitry Asanau (BLR)	Luke McCormack (GBR)
−63 kg	Sofiane Oumiha (FRA)	Dzmitry Asanau (BLR)	Gabil Mamedov (RUS)
−69 kg	Pat McCormack (GBR)	Andrey Zamkovoy (RUS)	Aidan Walsh (IRL)
−69 kg	Pat McCormack (GBR)	Andrey Zamkovoy (RUS)	Lorenzo Sotomayor (AZE)
−75 kg	Oleksandr Khyzhniak (UKR)	Gleb Bakshi (RUS)	Arman Darchinyan (ARM)
−75 kg	Oleksandr Khyzhniak (UKR)	Gleb Bakshi (RUS)	Andrej Csemez (SVK)
−81 kg	Loren Alfonso (AZE)	Benjamin Whittaker (GBR)	Gazimagomed Jalidov (ESP)
−81 kg	Loren Alfonso (AZE)	Benjamin Whittaker (GBR)	Luka Plantić (CRO)
−91 kg	Muslim Gadzhimagomedov (RUS)	Emmanuel Reyes (ESP)	Ammar Abduljabbar (GER)
−91 kg	Muslim Gadzhimagomedov (RUS)	Emmanuel Reyes (ESP)	Cheavon Clarke (GBR)
+91 kg	Mourad Aliev (FRA)	Frazer Clarke (GBR)	Mahammad Abdullayev (AZE)
+91 kg	Mourad Aliev (FRA)	Frazer Clarke (GBR)	Ivan Veriasov (RUS)

=== Women ===
Event	Gold	Silver	Bronze
−51 kg	Buse Naz Çakıroğlu (TUR)	Charley Davison (GBR)	Stoyka Krasteva (BUL)
−51 kg	Buse Naz Çakıroğlu (TUR)	Charley Davison (GBR)	Giordana Sorrentino (ITA)
−57 kg	Irma Testa (ITA)	Michaela Walsh (IRL)	Maria Nechita (ROU)
−57 kg	Irma Testa (ITA)	Michaela Walsh (IRL)	Stanimira Petrova (BUL)
−60 kg	Kellie Harrington (IRL)	Caroline Dubois (GBR)	Esra Yıldız (TUR)
−60 kg	Kellie Harrington (IRL)	Caroline Dubois (GBR)	Agnes Alexiusson (SWE)
−69 kg	Busenaz Sürmeneli (TUR)	Nadine Apetz (GER)	Anna Lysenko (UKR)
−69 kg	Busenaz Sürmeneli (TUR)	Nadine Apetz (GER)	Angela Carini (ITA)
−75 kg	Lauren Price (GBR)	Zemfira Magomedalieva (RUS)	Aoife O'Rourke (IRL)
−75 kg	Lauren Price (GBR)	Zemfira Magomedalieva (RUS)	Nouchka Fontijn (NED)

== Qualification summary ==
NOC	Men								Women					Total
NOC	52	57	63	69	75	81	91	+91	51	57	60	69	75	Total
Armenia	X				X									2
Azerbaijan		X	X	X		X		X						5
Belarus			X	X	X									3
Bulgaria									X	X				2
Croatia						X				X				2
France	X	X	X					X			X			5
Georgia	X			X	X									3
Germany		X					X					X		3
Great Britain	X	X	X	X		X	X	X	X	X	X		X	11
Hungary		X												1
Ireland	X			X		X				X	X		X	6
Italy									X	X	X	X		4
Netherlands			X										X	2
Poland			X						X					2
Romania	X									X				2
ROC		X	X	X	X	X	X	X	X			X	X	10
Slovakia					X									1
Spain	X	X				X	X							4
Sweden											X			1
Turkey	X								X		X	X		4
Ukraine		X	X		X							X		4
Total: 21 NOCs	8	8	8	6	6	6	4	4	6	6	6	5	4	77

== Results ==
=== Men ===
==== Flyweight (52 kg) ====
Seeds

1. (France) Billal Bennama (winner)
2. (Bulgaria) Daniel Asenov (round of 16)
3. (United Kingdom) Galal Yafai (runner-up)
4. (Spain) Gabriel Escobar (semifinals)

Round of 32
	Score	
Manuel Cappai (ITA)	1–4	Hamza Touba (GER)
Jakub Słomiński (POL)	RSC	Rasul Saliev (RUS)
Batuhan Çiftçi (TUR)	3–1	Zakaria Bouhdi (BEL)

Round of 16
Billal Bennama (FRA)	5
Hamza Touba (GER)	0
Dušan Janjić (SRB)	0
Sakhil Alakhverdovi (GEO)	5
István Szaka (HUN)	0
Brendan Irvine (IRL)	5
Dmytro Zamotayev (UKR)	1
Gabriel Escobar (ESP)	4
Galal Yafai (GBR)	5
Rasul Saliev (RUS)	0
Koryun Soghomonyan (ARM)	4
David Alaverdian (ISR)	1
Cosmin Girleanu (ROU)	3
Rufat Huseynov (AZE)	0
Batuhan Çiftçi (TUR)	3
Daniel Asenov (BUL)	2

Quarterfinals
Billal Bennama (FRA)	5
Sakhil Alakhverdovi (GEO)	0
Brendan Irvine (IRL)	0
Gabriel Escobar (ESP)	5
Galal Yafai (GBR)	5
Koryun Soghomonyan (ARM)	0
Cosmin Girleanu (ROU)	1
Batuhan Çiftçi (TUR)	4

Semifinals
Billal Bennama (FRA)	5
Gabriel Escobar (ESP)	0
Galal Yafai (GBR)	w/o
Batuhan Çiftçi (TUR)

Final
Billal Bennama (FRA)	DSQ
Galal Yafai (GBR)

==== Featherweight (57 kg) ====
Seeds

1. (United Kingdom) Peter McGrail (quarterfinals)
2. (Republic of Ireland) Kurt Walker (round of 16)
3. (Ukraine) Mykola Butsenko (semifinals)
4. (Azerbaijan) Tayfur Aliyev (quarterfinals)

Top half

Round of 32
Francesco Maietta (ITA)	2
Kevin Godla (CZE)	3
Arslan Khataev (FIN)	5
Boyan Asenov (BUL)	0
Roland Gálos (HUN)	3
Alen Rahimić (BIH)	2
Vasile Usturoi (BEL)	4
Hakan Doğan (TUR)	1
Robert Jitaru (ROU)	0
Samuel Kistohurry (FRA)	5
Edgaras Skurdelis (LTU)	5
Alexey Lagkazasvili (GRE)	0
Bishara Sabbar (ISR)	0
Tayfur Aliyev (AZE)	5

Round of 16
Peter McGrail (GBR)	5
Kevin Godla (CZE)	0
Arslan Khataev (FIN)	0
Roland Gálos (HUN)	5
Vasile Usturoi (BEL)	0
Samuel Kistohurry (FRA)	5
Edgaras Skurdelis (LTU)	2
Tayfur Aliyev (AZE)	3

Quarterfinals
Peter McGrail (GBR)	2
Roland Gálos (HUN)	3
Samuel Kistohurry (FRA)	5
Tayfur Aliyev (AZE)	0

Semifinals
Roland Gálos (HUN)	0
Samuel Kistohurry (FRA)	5

Bottom half

Round of 32
Mykola Butsenko (UKR)	RSC-I
Fredrik Jensen (DEN)
Artur Bazeyan (ARM)	5
Maciej Jóźwik (POL)	0
Nik Nikolov Veber (SLO)	2
José Quiles (ESP)	3
Krenar Zeneli (ALB)	3
Dorin Bucșa (MDA)	2
Nemanja Gavrilović (SRB)
Albert Batyrgaziev (RUS)	RSC
Viliam Tankó (SVK)	3
Artyush Gomtsyan (GEO)	1
Hamsat Shadalov (GER)	4
Anton Charnamaz (BLR)	1

Round of 16
Mykola Butsenko (UKR)	5
Artur Bazeyan (ARM)	0
José Quiles (ESP)	4
Krenar Zeneli (ALB)	1
Albert Batyrgaziev (RUS)	5
Viliam Tankó (SVK)	0
Hamsat Shadalov (GER)	5
Kurt Walker (IRL)	0

Quarterfinals
Mykola Butsenko (UKR)	w/o
José Quiles (ESP)
Albert Batyrgaziev (RUS)	3
Hamsat Shadalov (GER)	2

Semifinals
Mykola Butsenko (UKR)	0
Albert Batyrgaziev (RUS)	5

Final

Final
Samuel Kistohurry (FRA)	0
Albert Batyrgaziev (RUS)	5

==== Lightweight (63 kg) ====
Seeds

1. (Armenia) Hovhannes Bachkov (round of 16)
2. (France) Sofiane Oumiha (winner)
3. (United Kingdom) Luke McCormack (semifinals)
4. (Belarus) Dzmitry Asanau (runner-up)

Top half

Round of 32
Gabil Mamedov (RUS)	5
Lasha Guruli (GEO)	0
Jasin Ljama (MKD)
Alexandros Tsanikidis (GRE)	RSC
Paolo Di Lernia (ITA)	0
Yaroslav Khartsyz (UKR)	5
Semjon Kamanin (EST)	0
Milán Fodor (HUN)	5
Damian Durkacz (POL)	WO
Farid Walizadeh (ROT)
Shpetim Bajoku (KOS)
Nikolai Terteryan (DEN)	ABD

Round of 16
Hovhannes Bachkov (ARM)
Gabil Mamedov (RUS)	RSC
Alexandros Tsanikidis (GRE)
Yaroslav Khartsyz (UKR)	w/o
Milán Fodor (HUN)	0
Damian Durkacz (POL)	5
Nikolai Terteryan (DEN)	0
Dzmitry Asanau (BLR)	5

Quarterfinals
Gabil Mamedov (RUS)	5
Yaroslav Khartsyz (UKR)	0
Damian Durkacz (POL)	0
Dzmitry Asanau (BLR)	5

Semifinals
Gabil Mamedov (RUS)	2
Dzmitry Asanau (BLR)	3

Bottom half

Round of 32
Tuğrul Erdemir (TUR)	5
Kastriot Sopa (GER)	0
Enrico Lacruz (NED)	5
Ahmad Shwiti (ISR)	0
Abdelkarim Saboundji (BEL)	1
Rexhildo Zeneli (ALB)	4
George Bates (IRL)	RSC-I
León Domínguez (ESP)
Kiril Rusinov (BUL)	1
Javid Chalabiyev (AZE)	4
Michal Takács (SVK)	0
Alexandru Paraschiv (MDA)	5

Round of 16
Luke McCormack (GBR)	4
Tuğrul Erdemir (TUR)	1
Enrico Lacruz (NED)	5
Rexhildo Zeneli (ALB)	0
George Bates (IRL)	2
Javid Chalabiyev (AZE)	3
Alexandru Paraschiv (MDA)	1
Sofiane Oumiha (FRA)	4

Quarterfinals
Luke McCormack (GBR)	5
Enrico Lacruz (NED)	0
Javid Chalabiyev (AZE)	0
Sofiane Oumiha (FRA)	5

Semifinals
Luke McCormack (GBR)	1
Sofiane Oumiha (FRA)	4

Final

Final
Dzmitry Asanau (BLR)
Sofiane Oumiha (FRA)	w/o

==== Welterweight (69 kg) ====
Seeds

1. (United Kingdom) Pat McCormack (winner)
2. (Russia) Andrey Zamkovoy (runner-up)
3. (Azerbaijan) Lorenzo Sotomayor (semifinals)
4. (Ukraine) Yevhenii Barabanov (Olympic Box-Off)

Top half

Round of 32
Milan Vranković (SRB)	0
Hugo Micallef (MON)	5
Adem Fetahović (BIH)	5
Pavol Polakovič (CZE)	0
Eskerkhan Madiev (GEO)	4
Paul Andreas Wall (GER)	0
Aidan Walsh (IRL)	5
Pavel Kamanin (EST)	0
Wahid Hambli (FRA)	5
Patriot Behrami (KOS)	0
Mohamed Rachem (BEL)	5
László Kozák (HUN)	0
Attila Varga (SUI)
Yevhenii Barabanov (UKR)	RSC

Round of 16
Pat McCormack (GBR)	RSC
Hugo Micallef (MON)
Adem Fetahović (BIH)	0
Eskerkhan Madiev (GEO)	5
Aidan Walsh (IRL)	4
Wahid Hambli (FRA)	1
Mohamed Rachem (BEL)
Yevhenii Barabanov (UKR)	w/o

Quarterfinals
Pat McCormack (GBR)	5
Eskerkhan Madiev (GEO)	0
Aidan Walsh (IRL)	3
Yevhenii Barabanov (UKR)	2

Semifinals
Pat McCormack (GBR)	5
Aidan Walsh (IRL)	0

Bottom half

Round of 32
Lorenzo Sotomayor (AZE)	4
Dumitru Galagoț (MDA)	1
Sebastian Terteryan (DEN)	4
Mateusz Polski (POL)	0
Marko Zeljko (CRO)	1
Aliaksandr Radzionau (BLR)	4
Miroslav Kapuler (ISR)	4
Vincenzo Mangiacapre (ITA)	1
Marcel Rumpler (AUT)	5
Delano James (NED)	0
Necat Ekinci (TUR)	5
Gurgen Madoyan (ARM)	0
Eric Tudor (ROU)	2
Dionysos Pefanis (GRE)	3
Youba Sissokho (ESP)	1
Andrey Zamkovoy (RUS)	4

Round of 16
Lorenzo Sotomayor (AZE)	4
Sebastian Terteryan (DEN)	0
Aliaksandr Radzionau (BLR)	4
Miroslav Kapuler (ISR)	1
Marcel Rumpler (AUT)
Necat Ekinci (TUR)	w/o
Dionysos Pefanis (GRE)
Andrey Zamkovoy (RUS)	KO

Quarterfinals
Lorenzo Sotomayor (AZE)	5
Aliaksandr Radzionau (BLR)	0
Necat Ekinci (TUR)	0
Andrey Zamkovoy (RUS)	5

Semifinals
Lorenzo Sotomayor (AZE)
Andrey Zamkovoy (RUS)	w/o

Finals

Final
Pat McCormack (GBR)	5
Andrey Zamkovoy (RUS)	0

Olympic box-off
Eskerkhan Madiev (GEO)	4
Yevhenii Barabanov (UKR)	1
Aliaksandr Radzionau (BLR)	4
Necat Ekinci (TUR)	1

==== Middleweight (75 kg) ====
Seeds

1. (Russia) Gleb Bakshi (runner-up)
2. (Ukraine) Oleksandr Khyzhniak (winner)
3. (Italy) Salvatore Cavallaro (round of 32)
4. (Slovakia) Andrej Csemez (semifinals)

Round of 64
	Score	
Besart Pireva (KOS)	2–3	Andrei Vreme (MDA)
Edin Avdic (AUT)	1–4	Kamran Shakhsuvarly (AZE)

Top half

Round of 32
Gleb Bakshi (RUS)	5
Andrei Vreme (MDA)	0
Mindaugas Gedminas (NOR)	3
Imre Bacskai (HUN)	2
Serhat Güler (TUR)	5
Mikhael Ostroumov (ISR)	0
Antreas Kokkinos (CYP)	0
Vitali Bandarenka (BLR)	5
Silvio Schierle (GER)	2
Lancelot Proton de la Chapelle (BEL)	3
Angel Roque (SUI)	RSC
Miloš Bartl (CZE)
Goce Janeski (MKD)
Miguel Cuadrado (ESP)	KO
Ryszard Lewicki (POL)	0
Andrej Csemez (SVK)	5

Round of 16
Gleb Bakshi (RUS)	5
Mindaugas Gedminas (NOR)	0
Serhat Güler (TUR)	2
Vitali Bandarenka (BLR)	3
Lancelot Proton de la Chapelle (BEL)	4
Angel Roque (SUI)	1
Miguel Cuadrado (ESP)	0
Andrej Csemez (SVK)	5

Quarterfinals
Gleb Bakshi (RUS)	WO
Vitali Bandarenka (BLR)
Lancelot Proton de la Chapelle (BEL)	0
Andrej Csemez (SVK)	5

Semifinals
Gleb Bakshi (RUS)	w/o
Andrej Csemez (SVK)

Bottom half

Round of 32
Salvatore Cavallaro (ITA)	1
Arman Darchinyan (ARM)	4
Michael Nevin (IRL)	4
Max van der Pas (NED)	1
Muhammad Abdilrasoon (FIN)	3
Mladen Sobjeslavski (CRO)	2
Giorgi Kharabadze (GEO)	3
Sandro Poletan (SRB)	2
Simeon Chamov (BUL)	5
Vytautas Balsys (LTU)	0
Adam Chartoi (SWE)	5
Sorin Caliniuc (ROU)	0
Lewis Richardson (GBR)	5
Victor Yoka (FRA)	0
Kamran Shakhsuvarly (AZE)
Oleksandr Khyzhniak (UKR)	RSC

Round of 16
Arman Darchinyan (ARM)	WO
Michael Nevin (IRL)
Muhammad Abdilrasoon (FIN)	2
Giorgi Kharabadze (GEO)	3
Simeon Chamov (BUL)	2
Adam Chartoi (SWE)	3
Lewis Richardson (GBR)	0
Oleksandr Khyzhniak (UKR)	5

Quarterfinals
Arman Darchinyan (ARM)	3
Giorgi Kharabadze (GEO)	2
Adam Chartoi (SWE)
Oleksandr Khyzhniak (UKR)	DSQ

Semifinals
Arman Darchinyan (ARM)
Oleksandr Khyzhniak (UKR)	w/o

Finals

Final
Gleb Bakshi (RUS)	1
Oleksandr Khyzhniak (UKR)	4

Olympic box-off
Vitali Bandarenka (BLR)	5
Lancelot Proton de la Chapelle (BEL)	0
Giorgi Kharabadze (GEO)	3
Adam Chartoi (SWE)	2

==== Light heavyweight (81 kg) ====
Seeds

1. (United Kingdom) Benjamin Whittaker (runner-up)
2. (Azerbaijan) Loren Alfonso (winner)
3. (Turkey) Bayram Malkan (Olympic Box-Off)
4. (Austria) Umar Dzambekov (round of 32)

Top half

Round of 32
Blagoy Naydenov (BUL)
Paul Arădoaie (ROU)	RSC
Sebastian Wiktorzak (POL)
Stiven Aas (EST)	RSC-I
Péter Tallosi (HUN)	0
Liridon Nuha (SWE)	5
Emmett Brennan (IRL)	RSC
Radenko Tomić (BIH)
Uke Smajli (SUI)	4
Polyneikis Kalamaras (GRE)	1
Gor Nersesyan (ARM)	5
Karel Hořejšek (CZE)	0
Luka Plantić (CRO)	3
Umar Dzambekov (AUT)	2

Round of 16
Benjamin Whittaker (GBR)	4
Paul Arădoaie (ROU)	0
Stiven Aas (EST)	0
Liridon Nuha (SWE)	5
Emmett Brennan (IRL)	5
Uke Smajli (SUI)	0
Gor Nersesyan (ARM)
Luka Plantić (CRO)	RSC

Quarterfinals
Benjamin Whittaker (GBR)	5
Liridon Nuha (SWE)	0
Emmett Brennan (IRL)	0
Luka Plantić (CRO)	5

Semifinals
Benjamin Whittaker (GBR)	3
Luka Plantić (CRO)	2

Bottom half

Round of 32
Paulius Zujevas (LTU)	0
Mikhail Dauhaliavets (BLR)	5
Andrei Chiriacov (MDA)	1
Ziad El-Mohor (BEL)	4
Gazimagomed Jalidov (ESP)	3
Artjom Kasparian (NED)	2
Imam Khataev (RUS)	RSC
Gaëtan Ntambwe (FRA)
Simone Fiori (ITA)	5
Krenar Aliu (FIN)	0
Ibragim Bazuev (GER)	1
Stepan Hrekul (UKR)	4

Round of 16
Bayram Malkan (TUR)	RSC
Mikhail Dauhaliavets (BLR)
Ziad El-Mohor (BEL)	0
Gazimagomed Jalidov (ESP)	5
Imam Khataev (RUS)	4
Simone Fiori (ITA)	1
Stepan Hrekul (UKR)	0
Loren Alfonso (AZE)	5

Quarterfinals
Bayram Malkan (TUR)	1
Gazimagomed Jalidov (ESP)	4
Imam Khataev (RUS)	1
Loren Alfonso (AZE)	4

Semifinals
Gazimagomed Jalidov (ESP)
Loren Alfonso (AZE)	w/o

Finals

Final
Benjamin Whittaker (GBR)
Loren Alfonso (AZE)	w/o

Olympic box-off
Liridon Nuha (SWE)	0
Emmett Brennan (IRL)	5
Bayram Malkan (TUR)	0
Imam Khataev (RUS)	5

==== Heavyweight (91 kg) ====
Seeds

1. (Russia) Muslim Gadzhimagomedov (winner)
2. (Bulgaria) Radoslav Pantaleev (quarterfinals)
3. (United Kingdom) Cheavon Clarke (semifinals)
4. (Belarus) Uladzislau Smiahlikau (quarterfinals)

Top half

Round of 32
Nikolajs Grišuņins (LAT)	0
Wilfried Florentine (FRA)	5
Mücahit İlyas (TUR)	5
Rauf Rahimov (AZE)	0
Aziz Mouhiidine (ITA)	3
Džemal Bošnjak (BIH)	2
Kostiantyn Pinchuk (ISR)	4
Tadas Tamašauskas (LTU)	0
Serhiy Horskov (UKR)	3
Toni Filipi (CRO)	2

Round of 16
Muslim Gadzhimagomedov (RUS)	5
Wilfried Florentine (FRA)	0
Mücahit İlyas (TUR)	0
Aziz Mouhiidine (ITA)	5
Ammar Abduljabbar (GER)	1
Kostiantyn Pinchuk (ISR)	1
Serhiy Horskov (UKR)	2
Uladzislau Smiahlikau (BLR)	3

Quarterfinals
Muslim Gadzhimagomedov (RUS)	5
Aziz Mouhiidine (ITA)	0
Ammar Abduljabbar (GER)	5
Uladzislau Smiahlikau (BLR)	0

Semifinals
Muslim Gadzhimagomedov (RUS)	w/o
Ammar Abduljabbar (GER)

Bottom half

Round of 32
Narek Manasyan (ARM)	5
Ádám Hámori (HUN)	0
Victor Schelstraete (BEL)	5
Ahmed Hagag (AUT)	0
Cristian Filip (ROU)	0
Emmanuel Reyes (ESP)	5
Nikoloz Begadze (GEO)	1
Kirill Afanasev (IRL)	4
Dávid Michálek (SVK)
Mateusz Masternak (POL)	RSC-I

Round of 16
Cheavon Clarke (GBR)	3
Narek Manasyan (ARM)	2
Victor Schelstraete (BEL)	0
Vagkan Nanitzanian (GRE)	5
Emmanuel Reyes (ESP)	5
Kirill Afanasev (IRL)	0
Mateusz Masternak (POL)
Radoslav Pantaleev (BUL)	w/o

Quarterfinals
Cheavon Clarke (GBR)	3
Vagkan Nanitzanian (GRE)	2
Emmanuel Reyes (ESP)	DSQ
Radoslav Pantaleev (BUL)

Semifinals
Cheavon Clarke (GBR)	1
Emmanuel Reyes (ESP)	4

Final

Final
Muslim Gadzhimagomedov (RUS)	5
Emmanuel Reyes (ESP)	0

==== Super heavyweight (+91 kg) ====
Seeds

1. (Germany) Nelvie Tiafack (round of 16)
2. (Croatia) Marko Milun (round of 16)
3. (Armenia) Gurgen Hovhannisyan (round of 16)
4. (France) Mourad Aliev (winner)

Round of 32
	Score	
Algirdas Baniulis (LTU)	0–5	Tsotne Rogava (UKR)
Daniel Burciu (ROU)	0–5	Morten Givskov (DEN)
Ayoub Ghadfa (ESP)	0–5	Ivan Veriasov (RUS)
Frazer Clarke (GBR)	WO	Clemente Russo (ITA)

Round of 16
Nelvie Tiafack (GER)	0
Tsotne Rogava (UKR)	5
Adam Kulik (POL)	0
Mahammad Abdullayev (AZE)	5
Vladan Babić (SRB)	1
Giorgi Tchigladze (GEO)	4
Morten Givskov (DEN)
Mourad Aliev (FRA)	KO
Gurgen Hovhannisyan (ARM)	2
Ivan Veriasov (RUS)	3
Gytis Lisinskas (IRL)	0
Petar Belberov (BUL)	5
Aleksandar Mraovic (AUT)
Eren Uzun (TUR)	w/o
Frazer Clarke (GBR)	5
Marko Milun (CRO)	0

Quarterfinals
Tsotne Rogava (UKR)	1
Mahammad Abdullayev (AZE)	4
Giorgi Tchigladze (GEO)	0
Mourad Aliev (FRA)	5
Ivan Veriasov (RUS)	5
Petar Belberov (BUL)	0
Eren Uzun (TUR)	0
Frazer Clarke (GBR)	5

Semifinals
Mahammad Abdullayev (AZE)
Mourad Aliev (FRA)	w/o
Ivan Veriasov (RUS)
Frazer Clarke (GBR)	w/o

Final
Mourad Aliev (FRA)	4
Frazer Clarke (GBR)	1

=== Women ===
==== Flyweight (51 kg) ====
Seeds

1. (Turkey) Buse Naz Çakıroğlu (winner)
2. (Armenia) Anush Grigoryan (round of 16)
3. (Poland) Sandra Drabik (Olympic Box-Off Winner)
4. (Russia) Svetlana Soluianova (Olympic Box-Off Winner)

Round of 32
	Score	
María González (ESP)	5–0	Tamara Tarnóczy (HUN)
Aikaterini Koutsogeorgopoulou (GRE)	0–5	Stoyka Krasteva (BUL)
Eliana Pileggi (SUI)	WO	Iulia Coroli (MDA)
Tetyana Kob (UKR)	RSC	Anakhanim Aghayeva (AZE)
Giordana Sorrentino (ITA)	5–0	Ursula Gottlob (GER)

Round of 16
Buse Naz Çakıroğlu (TUR)	5
María González (ESP)	0
Yuliya Apanasovich (BLR)	RSC
Rugilė Altaravičiūtė (LTU)
Wassila Lkhadiri (FRA)	0
Stoyka Krasteva (BUL)	5
Eliana Pileggi (SUI)	0
Svetlana Soluianova (RUS)	5
Sandra Drabik (POL)	5
Tetyana Kob (UKR)	0
Carly McNaul (IRL)	0
Charley Davison (GBR)	5
Nina Radovanović (SRB)	5
Sanae Jah (BEL)	0
Giordana Sorrentino (ITA)	5
Anush Grigoryan (ARM)	0

Quarterfinals
Buse Naz Çakıroğlu (TUR)	5
Yuliya Apanasovich (BLR)	0
Stoyka Krasteva (BUL)	5
Svetlana Soluianova (RUS)	0
Sandra Drabik (POL)	0
Charley Davison (GBR)	5
Nina Radovanović (SRB)	2
Giordana Sorrentino (ITA)	3

Semifinals
Buse Naz Çakıroğlu (TUR)	5
Stoyka Krasteva (BUL)	0
Charley Davison (GBR)	5
Giordana Sorrentino (ITA)	0

Final
Buse Naz Çakıroğlu (TUR)	4
Charley Davison (GBR)	1

Olympic box-off
Yuliya Apanasovich (BLR)	0
Svetlana Soluianova (RUS)	5
Sandra Drabik (POL)	4
Nina Radovanović (SRB)	1

==== Featherweight (57 kg) ====
Seeds

1. (Russia) Liudmila Vorontsova (round of 16)
2. (Republic of Ireland) Michaela Walsh (runner-up)
3. (Bulgaria) Stanimira Petrova (semifinals)
4. (Germany) Ornella Wahner (round of 16)

Round of 32
	Score	
Sandra Brugger (SUI)	0–5	Irma Testa (ITA)
Aycan Güldağı (TUR)	3–2	Jenifer Fernández (ESP)
Szabina Szűcs (HUN)	RSC	Maria Nechita (ROU)
Sandra Kruk (POL)	5–0	Foteini Plea (GRE)
Helina Bruyevich (BLR)	4–1	Lenka Bernardová (CZE)
Vida Rudolf (SLO)	0–5	Iuliia Tsyplakova (UKR)
Melissa Mortensen (DEN)	1–3	Mona Mestiaen (FRA)

Round of 16
Liudmila Vorontsova (RUS)	0
Irma Testa (ITA)	5
Nikolina Ćaćić (CRO)	5
Amanda Millere (LAT)	0
Mahsati Hamzayeva (AZE)	0
Aycan Güldağı (TUR)	5
Maria Nechita (ROU)	5
Ornella Wahner (GER)	0
Stanimira Petrova (BUL)	4
Sandra Kruk (POL)	1
Helina Bruyevich (BLR)	0
Karriss Artingstall (GBR)	5
Stephanie Thour (SWE)	5
Iuliia Tsyplakova (UKR)	0
Mona Mestiaen (FRA)	1
Michaela Walsh (IRL)	4

Quarterfinals
Irma Testa (ITA)	5
Nikolina Ćaćić (CRO)	0
Aycan Güldağı (TUR)	0
Maria Nechita (ROU)	5
Stanimira Petrova (BUL)	4
Karriss Artingstall (GBR)	1
Stephanie Thour (SWE)	0
Michaela Walsh (IRL)	5

Semifinals
Irma Testa (ITA)	5
Maria Nechita (ROU)	0
Stanimira Petrova (BUL)	2
Michaela Walsh (IRL)	3

Final
Irma Testa (ITA)	5
Michaela Walsh (IRL)	0

Olympic box-off
Nikolina Ćaćić (CRO)	3
Aycan Güldağı (TUR)	2
Karriss Artingstall (GBR)	5
Stephanie Thour (SWE)	0

==== Lightweight (60 kg) ====
Seeds

1. (Finland) Mira Potkonen (round of 16)
2. (Republic of Ireland) Kellie Harrington (winner)
3. (Russia) Ekaterina Dynnik (round of 16)
4. (Sweden) Agnes Alexiusson (semifinals)

Round of 32
	Score	
Ala Staradub (BLR)	0–5	Caroline Dubois (GBR)
Delfine Persoon (BEL)	1–4	Nikoleta Pita (GRE)
Donjeta Sadiku (KOS)	3–2	Maya Kleinhans (GER)
Esra Yıldız (TUR)	5–0	Maryna Malovana (UKR)
Chelsey Heijnen (NED)	2–3	Kata Pribojszki (HUN)
Cristina Cosma (ROU)	0–5	Aneta Rygielska (POL)

Round of 16
Mira Potkonen (FIN)	0
Caroline Dubois (GBR)	5
Jessica Triebeľová (SVK)
Rebecca Nicoli (ITA)	RSC
Aslahan Mehmedova (BUL)	0
Nikoleta Pita (GRE)	5
Donjeta Sadiku (KOS)	2
Agnes Alexiusson (SWE)	3
Ekaterina Dynnik (RUS)	1
Esra Yıldız (TUR)	4
Kata Pribojszki (HUN)	4
Melissa González (ESP)	1
Maïva Hamadouche (FRA)	5
Marija Malenica (CRO)	0
Aneta Rygielska (POL)	0
Kellie Harrington (IRL)	5

Quarterfinals
Caroline Dubois (GBR)	5
Rebecca Nicoli (ITA)	0
Nikoleta Pita (GRE)	1
Agnes Alexiusson (SWE)	4
Esra Yıldız (TUR)	5
Kata Pribojszki (HUN)	0
Maïva Hamadouche (FRA)	0
Kellie Harrington (IRL)	5

Semifinals
Caroline Dubois (GBR)	5
Agnes Alexiusson (SWE)	0
Esra Yıldız (TUR)	0
Kellie Harrington (IRL)	5

Final
Caroline Dubois (GBR)	1
Kellie Harrington (IRL)	4

Olympic box-off
Rebecca Nicoli (ITA)	5
Nikoleta Pita (GRE)	0
Kata Pribojszki (HUN)	0
Maïva Hamadouche (FRA)	5

==== Welterweight (69 kg) ====
Seeds

1. (Turkey) Busenaz Sürmeneli (winner)
2. (Poland) Karolina Koszewska (Olympic Box-Off Final)
3. (Italy) Angela Carini (semifinals)
4. (Russia) Saadat Dalgatova (Olympic Box-Off Winner)

Round of 32
	Score	
Aleksandra Rapaić (SRB)	0–5	Elina Gustafsson (FIN)

Round of 16
Busenaz Sürmeneli (TUR)	5
Elina Gustafsson (FIN)	0
Ani Hovsepyan (ARM)	RSC
Martina Schmoranzová (CZE)
Anna Lysenko (UKR)	5
Eszter Oláh (HUN)	0
Rosie Eccles (GBR)	1
Saadat Dalgatova (RUS)	4
Angela Carini (ITA)	5
Christina Desmond (IRL)	0
Émilie Sonvico (FRA)	4
Ivana Habazin (CRO)	1
Melis Yonuzova (BUL)	0
Nadine Apetz (GER)	5
Madeleine Angelsen (NOR)	0
Karolina Koszewska (POL)	5

Quarterfinals
Busenaz Sürmeneli (TUR)	3
Ani Hovsepyan (ARM)	1
Anna Lysenko (UKR)	3
Saadat Dalgatova (RUS)	2
Angela Carini (ITA)	5
Émilie Sonvico (FRA)	0
Nadine Apetz (GER)	4
Karolina Koszewska (POL)	1

Semifinals
Busenaz Sürmeneli (TUR)	5
Anna Lysenko (UKR)	0
Angela Carini (ITA)	1
Nadine Apetz (GER)	4

Final
Busenaz Sürmeneli (TUR)	5
Nadine Apetz (GER)	0

Olympic box-off semifinals		Olympic box-off final
Ani Hovsepyan (ARM)	1
Saadat Dalgatova (RUS)	4	Saadat Dalgatova (RUS)	5
Émilie Sonvico (FRA)	0	Karolina Koszewska (POL)	0
Karolina Koszewska (POL)	5

==== Middleweight (75 kg) ====
Seeds

1. (United Kingdom) Lauren Price (winner)
2. (Netherlands) Nouchka Fontijn (semifinals)
3. (Russia) Zemfira Magomedalieva (runner-up)
4. (Poland) Elżbieta Wójcik (quarterfinals)

Round of 16
Lauren Price (GBR)	5
Davina Michel (FRA)	0
Gabrielė Stonkutė (LTU)	0
Anastasiia Chernokolenko (UKR)	5
Viktoryia Kebikava (BLR)	1
Aoife O'Rourke (IRL)	4
Aynur Rzayeva (AZE)	0
Elżbieta Wójcik (POL)	5
Zemfira Magomedalieva (RUS)	5
Tímea Nagy (HUN)	0
Assunta Canfora (ITA)	0
Şennur Demir (TUR)	5
Love Holgersson (SWE)	3
Christina Hammer (GER)	2
Kyriaki Aslanidi (GRE)
Nouchka Fontijn (NED)	w/o

Quarterfinals
Lauren Price (GBR)	5
Anastasiia Chernokolenko (UKR)	0
Aoife O'Rourke (IRL)	5
Elżbieta Wójcik (POL)	0
Zemfira Magomedalieva (RUS)	5
Şennur Demir (TUR)	0
Love Holgersson (SWE)	0
Nouchka Fontijn (NED)	5

Semifinals
Lauren Price (GBR)	5
Aoife O'Rourke (IRL)	0
Zemfira Magomedalieva (RUS)	4
Nouchka Fontijn (NED)	1

Final
Lauren Price (GBR)	5
Zemfira Magomedalieva (RUS)	0
