= 2019 AIBA World Boxing Championships – Middleweight =

Middleweight at the 2019 AIBA World Boxing Championships
- Venue: Ekaterinburg Expo
- Location: Yekaterinburg, Russia
- Dates: 9–21 September
- Competitors: 49 from 49 nations

Medalists
gold medal	Gleb Bakshi	Russia
silver medal	Eumir Marcial	Philippines
bronze medal	Hebert Conceição	Brazil
bronze medal	Tursynbay Kulakhmet	Kazakhstan

The Middleweight competition at the 2019 AIBA World Boxing Championships was held from 9 to 21 September 2019.

== Schedule ==
The schedule was as follows:

Date	Time	Round
Monday 9 September 2019	15:00	First round
Saturday 14 September 2019	17:00; 21:00	Second round
Monday 16 September 2019	19:00	Third round
Wednesday 18 September 2019	16:00	Quarterfinals
Friday 20 September 2019	16:00	Semifinals
Saturday 21 September 2019	19:45	Final

All times are Yekaterinburg Time (UTC+5)

== Results ==
=== Finals ===
Semi-finals
(Russia) Gleb Bakshi	4
(Brazil) Hebert Conceição	1
(Kazakhstan) Tursynbay Kulakhmet	0
(Philippines) Eumir Marcial	5

Final
(Russia) Gleb Bakshi	5
(Philippines) Eumir Marcial	0

=== Top half ===
==== Section 1 ====
First round
(Algeria) Younes Nemouchi	5
(Slovenia) Aljaž Venko	0
(Croatia) Mladen Sobjeslavski	0
(Dominican Republic) Euri Cedeño	5
(Sweden) Adam Chartoi	5
(Argentina) Francisco Verón	0
(Republic of Ireland) Michael Nevin	5
(Moldova) Andrei Vreme	0
(Azerbaijan) Amin Kushkhov	4
(Turkmenistan) Nursähet Pazzyýew	1

Second round
(Cuba) Arlen López	5
(Algeria) Younes Nemouchi	0
(Dominican Republic) Euri Cedeño	RSC-I
(Sweden) Adam Chartoi
(Lithuania) Vytautas Balsys	0
(Republic of Ireland) Michael Nevin	5
(Azerbaijan) Amin Kushkhov	1
(Russia) Gleb Bakshi	4

Third round
(Cuba) Arlen López	4
(Dominican Republic) Euri Cedeño	1
(Republic of Ireland) Michael Nevin	2
(Russia) Gleb Bakshi	3

Quarterfinals
(Cuba) Arlen López	2
(Russia) Gleb Bakshi	3

==== Section 2 ====
First round
(Germany) Andrej Mersljakov	RSC
(Qatar) Mohammed Abdullah
(Mongolia) Davaasürengiin Davaanyam	0
(Uzbekistan) Fanat Kakhramonov	5
(Belarus) Vitali Bandarenka	4
(South Korea) Kim Jin-jea	1
(Spain) Miguel Cuadrado	2
(Serbia) Sandro Poletan	3

Second round
(Brazil) Hebert Conceição	3
(Germany) Andrej Mersljakov	2
(Australia) Adrian Cammarano	0
(Uzbekistan) Fanat Kakhramonov	5
(Belarus) Vitali Bandarenka	5
(New Zealand) Ryan Scaife	0
(Serbia) Sandro Poletan	0
(Italy) Salvatore Cavallaro	5

Third round
(Brazil) Hebert Conceição	3
(Uzbekistan) Fanat Kakhramonov	2
(Belarus) Vitali Bandarenka	0
(Italy) Salvatore Cavallaro	5

Quarterfinals
(Brazil) Hebert Conceição	4
(Italy) Salvatore Cavallaro	1

=== Bottom half ===
==== Section 3 ====
First round
(Czech Republic) Miloš Bartl	5
(Israel) Mikhael Ostroumov	0
(United States) Javier Martínez	5
(Tajikistan) Bakhtiyor Mirzomukhammad	0
(England) Mark Dickinson	0
(Armenia) Arman Darchinyan	5
(Netherlands) Max van der Pas	0
(Turkey) Serhat Güler	5

Second round
(Kazakhstan) Tursynbay Kulakhmet	5
(Czech Republic) Miloš Bartl	0
(United States) Javier Martínez	5
(Poland) Bartosz Gołębiewski	0
(Saudi Arabia) Jaber Al-Faifi
(Armenia) Arman Darchinyan	RSC
(Turkey) Serhat Güler	1
(Slovakia) Andrej Csemez	4

Third round
(Kazakhstan) Tursynbay Kulakhmet	5
(United States) Javier Martínez	0
(Armenia) Arman Darchinyan	5
(Slovakia) Andrej Csemez	0

Quarterfinals
(Kazakhstan) Tursynbay Kulakhmet	5
(Armenia) Arman Darchinyan	0

==== Section 4 ====
First round
(China) Tuohetaerbieke Tanglatihan	5
(Scotland) Sean Lazzerini	0
(Iran) Shahin Mousavi	5
(Chinese Taipei) Kan Chia-wei	0
(Belgium) Lancelot Proton	5
(Democratic Republic of the Congo) David Tshama	0
(Ecuador) Bryan Angulo	0
(Philippines) Eumir Marcial	4

Second round
(India) Ashish Kumar	2
(China) Tuohetaerbieke Tanglatihan	3
(Iran) Shahin Mousavi	5
(Palestine) Islam Irshaid	0
(Kyrgyzstan) Omurbek Bekzhigit	5
(Belgium) Lancelot Proton	0
(Philippines) Eumir Marcial	RSC
(Morocco) Tarik Allali

Third round
(China) Tuohetaerbieke Tanglatihan	0
(Iran) Shahin Mousavi	5
(Kyrgyzstan) Omurbek Bekzhigit	0
(Philippines) Eumir Marcial	5

Quarterfinals
(Iran) Shahin Mousavi	0
(Philippines) Eumir Marcial	5
