= Hebert Conceição =

Brazilian boxer (born 1998)

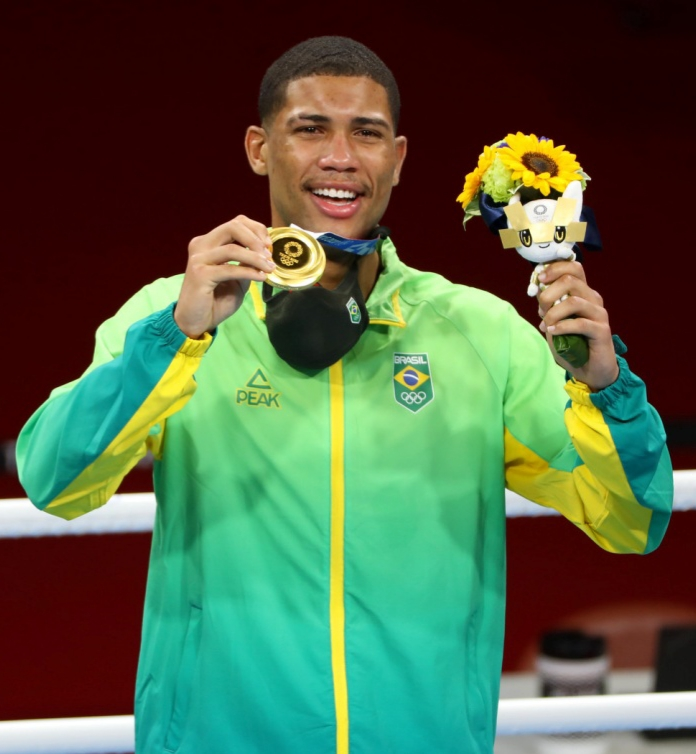
- Conceição in 2021

Personal information
- Born: Hebert William Carvalho da Conceição Sousa; 28 February 1998 (age 28) Salvador, Bahia, Brazil
- Height: 6 ft 1 1/2 in (187 cm)
- Weight: Middleweight

Boxing career

Boxing record
- Total fights: 11
- Wins: 11
- Win by KO: 5
Medal record
Men's amateur boxing
Representing Brazil
Olympic Games
Gold medal – first place	2020 Tokyo	Middleweight
World Championships
Bronze medal – third place	2019 Yekaterinburg	Middleweight
Pan American Games
Silver medal – second place	2019 Lima	Middleweight
South American Games
Bronze medal – third place	2018 Cochabamba	Middleweight

Hebert William Carvalho da Conceição Sousa (born 28 February 1998) is a Brazilian professional boxer. As an amateur, he won a gold medal at the delayed 2020 Tokyo Olympics as well as a bronze medal at the 2019 World Championships. Conceição also won a silver medal at the 2019 Pan American Games and a bronze medal at the 2018 South American Games. He turned professional in December 2021, signing a promotional contract with Probellum.

== Amateur career ==
=== Olympics result ===
Tokyo 2020

- Round of 16: Defeated Tuohetaerbieke Tanglatihan (China) 3–2
- Quarter-finals: Defeated Abilkhan Amankul (Kazakhstan) 3–2
- Semi-finals: Defeated Gleb Bakshi (ROC) 4–1
- Final: Defeated Oleksandr Khyzhniak (Ukraine) KO

=== World Championships result ===
Yekaterinburg 2019

- Round of 32: Defeated Andrej Mersljakov (Germany) 3–2
- Round of 16: Defeated Fanat Kakhramonov (Uzbekistan) 3–2
- Quarter-finals: Defeated Salvatore Cavallaro (Italy) 4–1
- Semi-final: Defeated by Gleb Bakshi (Russia) 4–1

=== Pan American Games result ===
Lima 2019

- Quarter-finals: Defeated Francisco Verón (Argentina) 3–2
- Semi-finals: Defeated Troy Isley (United States) 4–1
- Final: Defeated by Arlen López (Cuba) 5–0

== Professional boxing record ==
11 fights	11 wins	0 losses
By knockout	5	0
By decision	6	0

No.	Result	Record	Opponent	Type	Round, time	Date	Location	Notes
12	Win	12–0	José de Jesus Adame Chio	KO	8 (10), 1:46	11 Sep 2026	Frontwave Arena, Oceanside, California, U.S.	Retained WBO Latino super middleweight title
11	Win	11–0	Johan González	UD	10	10 Apr 2026	Prudential Center, Newark, New Jersey, U.S.	
10	Win	10–0	Elias Espadas	UD	10	18 Dec 2025	FTL War Memorial, Fort Lauderdale, Florida, U.S.	Retained WBO Latino super middleweight title
9	Win	9–0	Yamaguchi Falcão	UD	10	27 Sep 2025	ARCA Spaces, São Paulo, Brazil	Retained Brazilian super middleweight title and won vacant WBO Latino super middleweight title
8	Win	8–0	Thiago Ferreira da Silveira	TKO	3 (10)	2 Aug 2025	Ginasio da AABB, Brasília, Brazil	Retained Brazilian super middleweight title
7	Win	7–0	Rowdy Legend Montgomery	TKO	2 (8)	10 May 2025	Silver Spurs Arena, Kissimmee, Florida, U.S.	Middleweight bout.
6	Win	6–0	Esquiva Falcão	UD	10	15 Jun 2024	Komplexo Tempo, São Paulo, Brazil	Won vacant Brazilian super middleweight title
5	Win	5–0	Robert Talarek	TKO	2 (8)	1 Sep 2023	Gråkjær Arena, Holstebro, Denmark	
4	Win	4–0	Morrama Dheisw de Araújo Santos	KO	3 (6), 1:25	17 Dec 2022	Ginásio de Esportes, Lauro de Freitas, Brazil	
3	Win	3–0	Gideon Onyenani	PTS	6	11 Nov 2022	Sheffield Arena, Sheffield, England	
2	Win	2–0	Francisco Neves Valentim	UD	6	26 Aug 2022	Ginásio de Esportes, Lauro de Freitas, Brazil	
1	Win	1–0	Danny Mendoza	TKO	2 (6), 2:12	13 Aug 2022	Humo Arena, Tashkent, Uzbekistan	
