= Boxing at the 2019 European Games – Men's 75 kg =

Boxing competitions

Men's middleweight boxing at the 2019 European Games
- Venue: Uruchie Sports Palace
- Date: 21–30 June
- Competitors: 34 from 34 nations

Medalists
gold medal	Oleksandr Khyzhniak	Ukraine
silver medal	Salvatore Cavallaro	Italy
bronze medal	Andrej Csemez	Slovakia
bronze medal	Michael Nevin	Ireland

The men's middleweight 75 kg boxing event at the 2019 European Games in Minsk was held from 21 to 30 June at the Uruchie Sports Palace.

== Results ==
=== Final ===
Final; 30 June
Oleksandr Khyzhniak (UKR)	5
Salvatore Cavallaro (ITA)	0

=== Round of 64 ===
	Result	
Aljaž Venko (SLO)	0–5	Muhammad Abdilrasoon (FIN)
Giorgi Kharabadze (GEO)	5–0	Milosav Savić (SRB)

=== Top half ===
Round of 32; 22 June
Oleksandr Khyzhniak (UKR)	5
Muhammad Abdilrasoon (FIN)	0
Arman Darchinyan (ARM)	5
Mladen Sobjeslavski (CRO)	0
Rafał Perczyński (POL)
Miloš Bartl (CZE)	KO
Gleb Bakshi (RUS)	5
Andreas Kokkinos (CYP)	0
Andrej Csemez (SVK)	3
Arthur Beck (GER)	2
Victor Carapcevschi (MDA)	5
Rami Kiwan (BUL)	0
Miguel Cuadrado (ESP)	5
Edin Avdic (AUT)	0
Ruben Veciunca (BEL)
Zoltán Harcsa (HUN)	RSC

Round of 16; 23 June
Oleksandr Khyzhniak (UKR)	5
Arman Darchinyan (ARM)	0
Miloš Bartl (CZE)	0
Gleb Bakshi (RUS)	5
Andrej Csemez (SVK)	3
Victor Carapcevschi (MDA)	2
Miguel Cuadrado (ESP)	3
Zoltán Harcsa (HUN)	2

Quarterfinals; 25 June
Oleksandr Khyzhniak (UKR)	4
Gleb Bakshi (RUS)	1
Andrej Csemez (SVK)	4
Miguel Cuadrado (ESP)	1

Semifinals; 28 June
Oleksandr Khyzhniak (UKR)	RSC
Andrej Csemez (SVK)

=== Bottom half ===
Round of 32; 22 June
Salvatore Cavallaro (ITA)	5
Angel Roque (SUI)	0
Vytautas Balsys (LTU)	0
Mindaugas Gedminas (NOR)	5
Pavlos Tsagkrakos (GRE)	2
Adam Chartoi (SWE)	3
Arsim Etemi (MKD)	0
Max van der Pas (NED)	5
Vadzim Pankou (BLR)	4
Arjon Kajoshi (ALB)	1
Serhat Güler (TUR)	5
Victor Yoka (FRA)	0
Mark Dickinson (GBR)	2
Michael Nevin (IRL)	3
Giorgi Kharabadze (GEO)	1
Kamran Shakhsuvarly (AZE)	4

Round of 16; 23 June
Salvatore Cavallaro (ITA)	3
Mindaugas Gedminas (NOR)	2
Adam Chartoi (SWE)	4
Max van der Pas (NED)	1
Vadzim Pankou (BLR)	0
Serhat Güler (TUR)	5
Michael Nevin (IRL)	5
Kamran Shakhsuvarly (AZE)	0

Quarterfinals; 25 June
Salvatore Cavallaro (ITA)	4
Adam Chartoi (SWE)	1
Serhat Güler (TUR)	1
Michael Nevin (IRL)	4

Semifinals; 28 June
Salvatore Cavallaro (ITA)	KO
Michael Nevin (IRL)
