= Boxing at the 2020 Summer Olympics – Men's middleweight =

Men's middleweight at the Games of the XXXII Olympiad
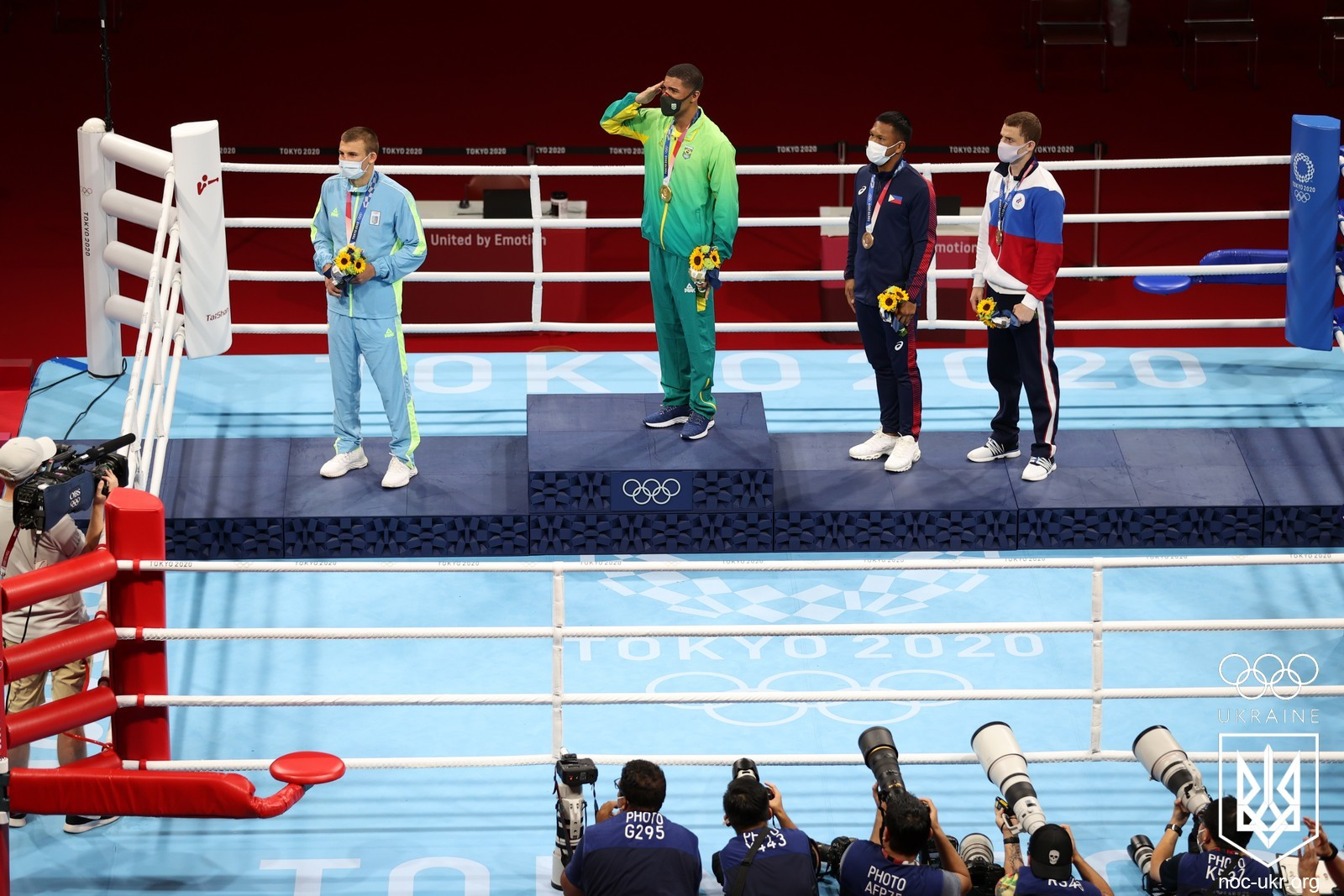
- Venue: Ryōgoku Kokugikan
- Dates: 26 July 2021; 7 August 2021
- Competitors: 25 from 25 nations

Medalists
1st place, gold medalist(s)		Hebert Conceição	Brazil
2nd place, silver medalist(s)		Oleksandr Khyzhniak	Ukraine
3rd place, bronze medalist(s)		Eumir Marcial	Philippines
3rd place, bronze medalist(s)		Gleb Bakshi	ROC

The men's middleweight boxing event at the 2020 Summer Olympics took place between 26 July and 7 August 2021 at the Ryōgoku Kokugikan, with 25 boxers from 25 nations competing.

The medals for the competition were presented by Sergey Bubka, IOC Member, Ukraine; Olympian, Gold Medalist, and the medalists' bouquets were presented by Willi Kaltschmitt Luján, BTF Member; Guatemala.

== Background ==
This will be the 26th appearance of the men's middleweight event. The event appeared at the first Olympic boxing tournament in 1904 and has been held at every Games with boxing (that is, excluding 1912) since. The middleweight class remains at the 69–75 kg range it has used since the 2004 Games.

Reigning World Champion Gleb Bakshi of Russia has qualified for the Games. The 2016 Olympic champion, Arlen López of Cuba, has moved up to the light-heavyweight class for the 2020 Games.

== Qualification ==
A National Olympic Committee (NOC) could enter only 1 qualified boxer in the weight class. There were 24 quota places available for the men's middleweight, allocated as follows:

- 1 place for the host nation, Japan.
- 3 places at the 2020 African Boxing Olympic Qualification Tournament.
- 5 places at the 2020 Asia & Oceania Boxing Olympic Qualification Tournament.
- 6 places at the 2020 European Boxing Olympic Qualification Tournament.
- 4 places that were intended to be awarded at the 2021 Pan American Boxing Olympic Qualification Tournament, which was cancelled. These places were instead awarded through the world ranking list to the top boxers from the Americas who had been registered for the qualification tournament.
- 4 places that were intended to be awarded at a World Olympic Qualifying Tournament, which was cancelled. These places were instead awarded through the world ranking list, with one place for each continental zone (Africa, Asia & Oceania, Europe, Americas).
- 1 place for a Tripartite Commission invitation.

In addition, a Refugee Olympic Team invitation was made to Eldric Sella, bringing the total number of boxers in the class to 25.

== Competition format ==
Like all Olympic boxing events, the competition is a straight single-elimination tournament. The competition begins with a preliminary round, where the number of competitors is reduced to 16, and concludes with a final. As there are fewer than 32 boxers in the competition, a number of boxers will receive a bye through the preliminary round. Both semifinal losers are awarded bronze medals.

Bouts consist of three three-minute rounds with a one-minute break between rounds. A boxer may win by knockout or by points. Scoring is on the "10-point-must" system, with 5 judges scoring each round. Judges consider "number of blows landed on the target areas, domination of the bout, technique and tactical superiority and competitiveness." Each judge determines a winner for each round, who receives 10 points for the round, and assigns the round's loser a number of points between 7 and 9 based on performance. The judge's scores for each round are added to give a total score for that judge. The boxer with the higher score from a majority of the judges is the winner.

== Schedule ==
The middleweight starts with the round of 32 on 26 July. There are two rest days before the round of 16 on 29 July, then two more rest days before the quarterfinals on 1 August. After that, there are three rest days before the semifinals on 5 August but only one before the final on 7 August.

Legend

R32	Round of 32	R16	Round of 16	QF	Quarterfinals	SF	Semifinals	F	Final

Date	Jul 24		Jul 25		Jul 26		Jul 27		Jul 28		Jul 29		Jul 30		Jul 31		Aug 1		Aug 2		Aug 3		Aug 4		Aug 5		Aug 6		Aug 7		Aug 8	
Event	A	E	A	E	A	E	A	E	A	E	A	E	A	E	A	E	A	E	A	E	A	E	A	E	A	E	A	E	A	E	A	E
Men's middleweight					R32						R16						QF								SF				F			

== Results ==
=== Finals ===
Final
Oleksandr Khyzhniak (UKR)
Hebert Conceição (BRA)	KO

=== Top half ===
Round of 32
Shahin Mousavi (IRI)	2
Yuito Moriwaki (JPN)	3
Francisco Verón (ARG)	5
Adam Chartoi (SWE)	0
Eldric Sella (EOR)
Euri Cedeño (DOM)	RSC
Aaron Prince (TTO)	0
Andrej Csemez (SVK)	4
Younes Nemouchi (ALG)	5
Kavuma Ssemujju (UGA)	0

Round of 16
Oleksandr Khyzhniak (UKR)	5
Yuito Moriwaki (JPN)	0
Francisco Verón (ARG)	2
Euri Cedeño (DOM)	3
Arman Darchinyan (ARM)	5
Andrej Csemez (SVK)	0
Younes Nemouchi (ALG)
Eumir Marcial (PHI)	RSC–I

Quarterfinals
Oleksandr Khyzhniak (UKR)	4
Euri Cedeño (DOM)	1
Arman Darchinyan (ARM)
Eumir Marcial (PHI)	KO

Semifinals
Oleksandr Khyzhniak (UKR)	3
Eumir Marcial (PHI)	2

=== Bottom half ===
Round of 32
Ashish Kumar (IND)	0
Tuohetaerbieke Tanglatihan (CHN)	5
Fanat Kakhramonov (UZB)	5
Giorgi Kharabadze (GEO)	0
David Tshama (COD)	3
Wilfried Ntsengue (CMR)	2
Troy Isley (USA)	5
Vitali Bandarenka (BLR)	0

Round of 16
Hebert Conceição (BRA)	3
Tuohetaerbieke Tanglatihan (CHN)	2
Fanat Kakhramonov (UZB)	0
Abilkhan Amankul (KAZ)	5
Darrelle Valsaint (HAI)	4
David Tshama (COD)	1
Troy Isley (USA)	2
Gleb Bakshi (ROC)	3

Quarterfinals
Hebert Conceição (BRA)	3
Abilkhan Amankul (KAZ)	2
Darrelle Valsaint (HAI)	0
Gleb Bakshi (ROC)	5

Semifinals
Hebert Conceição (BRA)	4
Gleb Bakshi (ROC)	1
