= Slovakia at the 2020 Summer Olympics =

- IOC code: SVK
- NOC: Slovak Olympic and Sports Committee
- Website: www.olympic.sk (in Slovak)

in Tokyo, Japan 23 July 2021 – 8 August 2021
- Competitors: 41 in 13 sports
- Flag bearers (opening): Zuzana Rehák-Štefečeková; Matej Beňuš
- Flag bearer (closing): Danka Barteková
- Medals Ranked 50th: Gold 1 Silver 2 Bronze 1 Total 4

Summer Olympics appearances (overview)
- 1996; 2000; 2004; 2008; 2012; 2016; 2020; 2024; 2028

Other related appearances
- Hungary (1896–1912); Czechoslovakia (1924–1992)

Slovakia competed at the 2020 Summer Olympics in Tokyo. Originally scheduled to take place from 24 July to 9 August 2020, the Games were postponed to 23 July to 8 August 2021, due to the COVID-19 pandemic. It was the nation's seventh consecutive appearance at the Summer Olympics after gaining its independence from the former Czechoslovakia.

== Medalists ==
Medal	Name	Sport	Event	Date
Gold	Zuzana Rehák-Štefečeková	Shooting	Women's trap	29 July
Silver	Jakub Grigar	Canoeing	Men's slalom K-1	30 July
Silver	Rory Sabbatini	Golf	Men's individual	1 August
Bronze	Samuel Baláž; Denis Myšák; Erik Vlček; Adam Botek	Canoeing	Men's K-4 500 m	7 August

Medals by sport
Sport	1st place, gold medalist(s)	2nd place, silver medalist(s)	3rd place, bronze medalist(s)	Total
Shooting	1	0	0	1
Canoeing	0	1	1	2
Golf	0	1	0	1
Total	1	2	1	4

== Competitors ==
The following is the list of number of competitors in the Games.

Sport	Men	Women	Total
Archery	0	1	1
Athletics	5	4	9
Badminton	0	1	1
Boxing	1	0	1
Canoeing	7	2	9
Cycling	2	0	2
Golf	1	0	1
Gymnastics	0	1	1
Shooting	4	3	7
Swimming	1	1	2
Table tennis	2	1	3
Tennis	3	0	3
Wrestling	1	0	1
Total	27	14	41

Medals by date
Day	Date	1st place, gold medalist(s)	2nd place, silver medalist(s)	3rd place, bronze medalist(s)	Total
Day 1	24 July	0	0	0	0
Day 2	25 July	0	0	0	0
Day 3	26 July	0	0	0	0
Day 4	27 July	0	0	0	0
Day 5	28 July	0	0	0	0
Day 6	29 July	1	0	0	1
Day 7	30 July	0	1	0	1
Day 8	31 July	0	0	0	0
Day 9	1 August	0	1	0	1
Day 10	2 August	0	0	0	0
Day 11	3 August	0	0	0	0
Day 12	4 August	0	0	0	0
Day 13	5 August	0	0	0	0
Day 14	6 August	0	0	0	0
Day 15	7 August	0	0	1	1
Day 16	8 August	0	0	0	0
Total		1	2	1	4

== Archery ==
One Slovak archer booked an Olympic place in the women's individual recurve by finishing in the top four at the 2021 European Championships in Antalya, Turkey.

Athlete	Event	Ranking round		Round of 64	Round of 32	Round of 16	Quarterfinals	Semifinals	Final / BM	
Athlete	Event	Score	Seed	Opposition Score	Opposition Score	Opposition Score	Opposition Score	Opposition Score	Opposition Score	Rank
Denisa Baránková	Women's individual	655	12	Pärnat (EST); L 4–6	Did not advance					

== Athletics ==
Slovak athletes further achieved the entry standards, either by qualifying time or by world ranking, in the following track and field events (up to a maximum of 3 athletes in each event):

Key

- Note–Ranks given for track events are within the athlete's heat only
- Q = Qualified for the next round
- q = Qualified for the next round as a fastest loser or, in field events, by position without achieving the qualifying target
- NR = National record
- N/A = Round not applicable for the event
- Bye = Athlete not required to compete in round

Track & road events
Men

Athlete	Event	Heat		Quarterfinal		Semifinal		Final	
Athlete	Event	Result	Rank	Result	Rank	Result	Rank	Result	Rank
Ján Volko	100 m	Bye		10.40	7	Did not advance			
Ján Volko	200 m	21.21	5	—N/a		Did not advance			
Miroslav Úradník	20 km walk	—N/a						1:29:25	41
Michal Morvay	50 km walk	—N/a						4:15:22	41
Matej Tóth	50 km walk	—N/a						3:56:23	14

Women

Athlete	Event	Heat		Semifinal		Final	
Athlete	Event	Result	Rank	Result	Rank	Result	Rank
Gabriela Gajanová	800 m	2:01.41	7	Did not advance			
Emma Zapletalová	400 m hurdles	55.00	6 q	55.79	6	Did not advance	
Mária Czaková	20 km walk	—N/a				1:41:29	45

Field events

Athlete	Event	Qualification		Final	
Athlete	Event	Distance	Position	Distance	Position
Marcel Lomnický	Men's hammer throw	72.52	24	Did not advance	
Martina Hrašnová	Women's hammer throw	66.63	25	Did not advance	

== Badminton ==
Slovakia entered one badminton player into the Olympic tournament, marking the country's return to the sport for the first time since London 2012. Martina Repiská was automatically selected among the top 40 individual shuttlers in the women's singles based on the BWF World Race to Tokyo Rankings of June 15, 2021.

Athlete	Event	Group stage			Elimination	Quarterfinal	Semifinal	Final / BM	
Athlete	Event	Opposition Score	Opposition Score	Rank	Opposition Score	Opposition Score	Opposition Score	Opposition Score	Rank
Martina Repiská	Women's singles	Sotomayor (GUA); W (21–19, 21–12)	Li (CAN); L (18–21, 16–21)	2	Did not advance				

== Boxing ==
Slovakia entered one male boxer into the Olympic tournament for the first time since Atlanta 1996. Andrej Csemez secured a spot in the men's middleweight division by scoring a quarterfinal victory at the 2020 European Qualification Tournament in Villebon-sur-Yvette, France.

Athlete	Event	Round of 32	Round of 16	Quarterfinals	Semifinals	Final	
Athlete	Event	Opposition Result	Opposition Result	Opposition Result	Opposition Result	Opposition Result	Rank
Andrej Csemez	Men's middleweight	Prince (TTO); W 4–0	Darchinyan (ARM); L 0–5	Did not advance			

== Canoeing ==
=== Slalom ===
Slovak canoeists qualified one boat for each of the following classes through the 2019 ICF Canoe Slalom World Championships in La Seu d'Urgell, Spain and the 2021 European Canoe Slalom Championships in Ivrea, Italy.

Athlete	Event	Preliminary						Semifinal		Final	
Athlete	Event	Run 1	Rank	Run 2	Rank	Best	Rank	Time	Rank	Time	Rank
Matej Beňuš	Men's C-1	99.61	2	96.89	1	96.89	1 Q	106.40	9 Q	105.60	6
Jakub Grigar	Men's K-1	94.37	9	92.38	8	92.38	8 Q	96.27	4 Q	94.85	2nd place, silver medalist(s)
Monika Škáchová	Women's C-1	125.65	16	116.85	11	116.85	12 Q	124.87	10 Q	129.39	9
Eliška Mintálová	Women's K-1	107.67	3	117.55	18	107.67	8 Q	107.18	2 Q	158.36	9

=== Sprint ===
Slovak canoeists qualified two boats in each of the following distances for the Games through the 2019 ICF Canoe Sprint World Championships in Szeged, Hungary.

Athlete	Event	Heats		Quarterfinals		Semifinals		Final	
Athlete	Event	Time	Rank	Time	Rank	Time	Rank	Time	Rank
Peter Gelle	Men's K-1 1000 m	3:42.131	2 SF	Bye		3:28.255	7 FB	3:28.240	14
Samuel Baláž; Adam Botek	Men's K-2 1000 m	3:13.982	3 QF	3:11.458	2 SF	3:20.917	6 FB	3:21.087	10
Samuel Baláž; Adam Botek; Denis Myšák; Erik Vlček	Men's K-4 500 m	1:21.807	2 SF	—N/a		1:23.799	2 FA	1:23.534	3rd place, bronze medalist(s)

Qualification Legend: FA = Qualify to final (medal); FB = Qualify to final B (non-medal)

== Cycling ==
=== Road ===
Slovakia entered two riders to compete in the men's Olympic road race, by virtue of their top 50 national finish (for men) in the UCI World Ranking.

Athlete	Event	Time	Rank
Lukáš Kubiš	Men's road race	Did not finish	
Lukáš Kubiš	Men's time trial	1:06:25.20	37
Juraj Sagan	Men's road race	Did not finish	

== Golf ==
Slovakia entered one golfer for the first time into the Olympic tournament. South African-born Rory Sabbatini (world no. 167) qualified directly among the top 60 eligible players for the men's event based on the IGF World Rankings.

Athlete	Event	Round 1	Round 2	Round 3	Round 4	Total		
Athlete	Event	Score	Score	Score	Score	Score	Par	Rank
Rory Sabbatini	Men's	69	67	70	61	267	−17	2nd place, silver medalist(s)

== Gymnastics ==
=== Artistic ===
Slovakia entered one artistic gymnast into the Olympic competition. Rio 2016 Olympian Barbora Mokošová booked a spot in the women's individual all-around and apparatus events, by finishing nineteenth out of the twenty gymnasts eligible for qualification at the 2019 World Championships in Stuttgart, Germany.

Women

Athlete	Event	Qualification						Final					
Athlete	Event	Apparatus				Total	Rank	Apparatus				Total	Rank
Athlete	Event	V	UB	BB	F	Total	Rank	V	UB	BB	F	Total	Rank
Barbora Mokošová	All-around	13.333	13.333	11.700	12.833	51.199	52	Did not advance					

== Shooting ==
Slovak shooters achieved quota places for the following events by virtue of their best finishes at the 2018 ISSF World Championships, the 2019 ISSF World Cup series, European Championships or Games, and European Qualifying Tournament, as long as they obtained a minimum qualifying score (MQS) by May 31, 2020.

Athlete	Event	Qualification		Final	
Athlete	Event	Points	Rank	Points	Rank
Patrik Jány	Men's 10 m air rifle	630.5	4 Q	143.7	7
Patrik Jány	Men's 50 m rifle 3 positions	1172	13	Did not advance	
Juraj Tužinský	Men's 10 m air pistol	570	27	Did not advance	
Erik Varga	Men's trap	122	11	Did not advance	
Danka Barteková	Women's skeet	118	13	Did not advance	
Zuzana Rehák-Štefečeková	Women's trap	125 WR	1 Q	43 OR	1st place, gold medalist(s)
Marián Kovačócy; Jana Špotáková	Mixed trap team	144	8	Did not advance	
Erik Varga; Zuzana Rehák-Štefečeková	Mixed trap team	146	3 Q	42	4

== Swimming ==
Slovakia received a universality invitation from FINA to send two top-ranked swimmers (one per gender) in their respective individual events to the Olympics, based on the FINA Points System of June 28, 2021.

Athlete	Event	Heat		Semifinal		Final	
Athlete	Event	Time	Rank	Time	Rank	Time	Rank
Richard Nagy	Men's 200 m butterfly	2:01.91	37	Did not advance			
Richard Nagy	Men's 400 m individual medley	4:18.29	23	—N/a		Did not advance	
Andrea Podmaníková	Women's 100 m breaststroke	1:08.36	28	Did not advance			
Andrea Podmaníková	Women's 200 m breaststroke	2:29.56	30	Did not advance			

== Table tennis ==
Slovakia entered three athletes into the table tennis competition at the Games. Rio 2016 Olympian Wang Yang scored a third-match final triumph to book one of the four available places in the men's singles at the 2021 ITTF World Qualification Tournament in Doha, Qatar.

Athlete	Event	Preliminary	Round 1	Round 2	Round 3	Round of 16	Quarterfinals	Semifinals	Final / BM	
Athlete	Event	Opposition Result	Opposition Result	Opposition Result	Opposition Result	Opposition Result	Opposition Result	Opposition Result	Opposition Result	Rank
Wang Yang	Men's singles	Bye		Powell (AUS); W 4–0	Niwa (JPN); L 0–4	Did not advance				
Barbora Balážová	Women's singles	Bye		Liu (USA); L 0–4	Did not advance					
Ľubomír Pištej; Barbora Balážová	Mixed doubles	—N/a				Ionescu / Szőcs (ROU); L 1–4	Did not advance			

== Tennis ==
Slovakia entered three tennis players into the Olympic tournament. Norbert Gombos (world no. 89) qualified directly as one of the top 56 eligible players in the men's singles based on the ATP World Rankings of June 13, 2021, with Filip Polášek and Lukáš Klein joining him on the roster to compete in the men's doubles.

Athlete	Event	Round of 64	Round of 32	Round of 16	Quarterfinals	Semifinals	Final / BM	
Athlete	Event	Opposition Score	Opposition Score	Opposition Score	Opposition Score	Opposition Score	Opposition Score	Rank
Norbert Gombos	Men's singles	Giron (USA); L 6–7^{(4–7)}, 6–3, 2–6	Did not advance					
Lukáš Klein	Men's singles	Duckworth (AUS); L 7–5, 3–6, 6–7^{(4–7)}	Did not advance					
Lukáš Klein; Filip Polášek	Men's doubles	—N/a	Karatsev / Medvedev (ROC); W 7–5, 6–4	Krajicek / Sandgren (USA); L 7–6^{(7–2)}, 2–6, [5–10]	Did not advance			

== Wrestling ==
For the first time since 2008, Slovakia qualified one wrestler for the men's freestyle 86 kg into the Olympic competition, by progressing to the top two finals at the 2021 World Qualification Tournament in Sofia, Bulgaria.

Key:

- VT (ranking points: 5–0 or 0–5) – Victory by fall.
- VB (ranking points: 5–0 or 0–5) – Victory by injury (VF for forfeit, VA for withdrawal or disqualification)
- PP (ranking points: 3–1 or 1–3) – Decision by points – the loser with technical points.
- PO (ranking points: 3–0 or 0–3) – Decision by points – the loser without technical points.
- ST (ranking points: 4–0 or 0–4) – Great superiority – the loser without technical points and a margin of victory of at least 8 (Greco-Roman) or 10 (freestyle) points.
- SP (ranking points: 4–1 or 1–4) – Technical superiority – the loser with technical points and a margin of victory of at least 8 (Greco-Roman) or 10 (freestyle) points.

Freestyle

Athlete	Event	Round of 16	Quarterfinal	Semifinal	Repechage	Final / BM	
Athlete	Event	Opposition Result	Opposition Result	Opposition Result	Opposition Result	Opposition Result	Rank
Boris Makoev	Men's −86 kg	Naifonov (ROC); L 0–3 ^{PO}	Did not advance				14
