= Armenia at the 2020 Summer Olympics =

- Flag of Armenia
- IOC code: ARM
- NOC: National Olympic Committee of Armenia
- Website: www.armnoc.am (in Armenian)

in Tokyo, Japan July 23, 2021 – August 8, 2021
- Competitors: 17 (14 men and 3 women) in 8 sports
- Flag bearers (opening): Hovhannes Bachkov; Varsenik Manucharyan
- Flag bearer (closing): Hovhannes Bachkov
- Medals Ranked 69th: Gold 0 Silver 2 Bronze 2 Total 4

Summer Olympics appearances (overview)
- 1996; 2000; 2004; 2008; 2012; 2016; 2020; 2024

Other related appearances
- Russian Empire (1900–1912); Soviet Union (1952–1988); Unified Team (1992)

Armenia competed at the 2020 Summer Olympics in Tokyo. Originally scheduled to take place from 24 July to 9 August 2020, the Games were postponed to 23 July to 8 August 2021, because of the COVID-19 pandemic. It was the nation's seventh consecutive appearance at the Summer Olympics in the post-Soviet era.

== Medalists ==
Medal	Name	Sport	Event	Date
Silver	Artur Aleksanyan	Wrestling	Men's Greco-Roman 97 kg	3 August
Silver	Simon Martirosyan	Weightlifting	Men's 109 kg	3 August
Bronze	Artur Davtyan	Gymnastics	Men's vault	2 August
Bronze	Hovhannes Bachkov	Boxing	Men's lightweight	6 August

== Competitors ==
The following is the list of number of competitors in the Games.

Sport	Men	Women	Total
Athletics	1	0	1
Boxing	3	0	3
Gymnastics	1	0	1
Judo	1	0	1
Shooting	0	1	1
Swimming	1	1	2
Weightlifting	1	1	2
Wrestling	6	0	6
Total	14	3	17

== Athletics ==
Key

- Note–Ranks given for track events are within the athlete's heat only
- Q = Qualified for the next round
- q = Qualified for the next round as a fastest loser or, in field events, by position without achieving the qualifying target
- NR = National record
- N/A = Round not applicable for the event
- Bye = Athlete not required to compete in round

Field events

Athlete	Event	Qualification		Final	
Athlete	Event	Distance	Position	Distance	Position
Levon Aghasyan	Men's triple jump	16.42	21	Did not advance	

== Boxing ==
Armenia entered three male boxers into the Olympic tournament. Koryun Soghomonyan scored a round-of-16 victory to secure a spot in the men's flyweight division at the 2020 European Qualification Tournament in London, United Kingdom.

Athlete	Event	Round of 32	Round of 16	Quarterfinals	Semifinals	Final	
Athlete	Event	Opposition Result	Opposition Result	Opposition Result	Opposition Result	Opposition Result	Rank
Koryun Soghomonyan	Men's flyweight	Yafai (GBR); L RSC	Did not advance				
Hovhannes Bachkov	Men's lightweight	Ryan (ANT); W 5–0	Chalabiyev (AZE); W 4–1	Abduraimov (UZB); W 5–0	Davis (USA); L 0–5	Did not advance	3rd place, bronze medalist(s)
Arman Darchinyan	Men's middleweight	Bye	Csemez (SVK); W 5–0	Marcial (PHI); L KO	Did not advance		

== Gymnastics ==
=== Artistic ===
Armenia entered one artistic gymnast into the Olympic competition. Set to compete in his third Games, Artur Davtyan booked a spot in the men's individual all-around and apparatus events, by finishing ninth out of the twelve gymnasts eligible for qualification at the 2019 World Championships in Stuttgart, Germany.

Men

Athlete	Event	Qualification								Final							
Athlete	Event	Apparatus						Total	Rank	Apparatus						Total	Rank
Athlete	Event	F	PH	R	V	PB	HB	Total	Rank	F	PH	R	V	PB	HB	Total	Rank
Artur Davtyan	Vault	—			14.866	—		14.866	2 Q	—			14.733	—		14.733	3rd place, bronze medalist(s)
Artur Davtyan	Pommel horse	—	14.566	—				14.566	13	Did not advance							

== Judo ==
Armenia entered one male judoka into the Olympic tournament based on the International Judo Federation Olympics Individual Ranking.

Athlete	Event	Round of 64	Round of 32	Round of 16	Quarterfinals	Semifinals	Repechage	Final / BM	
Athlete	Event	Opposition Result	Opposition Result	Opposition Result	Opposition Result	Opposition Result	Opposition Result	Opposition Result	Rank
Ferdinand Karapetian	Men's −73 kg	Bye	Smagulov (KAZ); L 00–01	Did not advance					

== Shooting ==
Armenia entered one shooter at the games, after getting the allocation quotas.

Athlete	Event	Qualification		Final	
Athlete	Event	Points	Rank	Points	Rank
Elmira Karapetyan	Women's 10 m air pistol	573	18	Did not advance	

Qualification Legend: Q = Qualify for the next round; q = Qualify for the bronze medal (shotgun)

== Swimming ==
Armenia entered two universality swimmers.

Athlete	Event	Heat		Semifinal		Final	
Athlete	Event	Time	Rank	Time	Rank	Time	Rank
Artur Barseghyan	Men's 50 m freestyle	23.14	43	Did not advance			
Artur Barseghyan	Men's 100 m freestyle	49.78	38	Did not advance			
Varsenik Manucharyan	Women's 100 m freestyle	59.18	45	Did not advance			

== Weightlifting ==
Armenian weightlifters qualified for two quota places at the games, based on the Tokyo 2020 Rankings Qualification List of 11 June 2021.

Athlete	Event	Snatch		Clean & jerk		Total	Rank
Athlete	Event	Result	Rank	Result	Rank	Total	Rank
Simon Martirosyan	Men's –109 kg	195	1	228	2	423	2nd place, silver medalist(s)
Izabella Yaylyan	Women's –59 kg	95	4	110	8	205	7

== Wrestling ==
Armenia qualified six wrestlers for each of the following classes into the Olympic competition. Two of them finished among the top six to book Olympic spots in the men's Greco-Roman wrestling (77 and 97 kg) at the 2019 World Championships, while two additional licenses were awarded to the Armenian wrestlers, who progressed to the top two finals of the men's freestyle 57 and 65 kg, respectively, at the 2021 European Olympic Qualification Tournament in Budapest, Hungary. Two Armenian wrestlers claimed one of the remaining slots each in the men's Greco-Roman 60 and 67 kg, respectively, to complete the nation's roster at the 2021 World Qualification Tournament in Sofia, Bulgaria.

Key:

- VT (ranking points: 5–0 or 0–5) – Victory by fall.
- VB (ranking points: 5–0 or 0–5) – Victory by injury (VF for forfeit, VA for withdrawal or disqualification)
- PP (ranking points: 3–1 or 1–3) – Decision by points – the loser with technical points.
- PO (ranking points: 3–0 or 0–3) – Decision by points – the loser without technical points.
- ST (ranking points: 4–0 or 0–4) – Great superiority – the loser without technical points and a margin of victory of at least 8 (Greco-Roman) or 10 (freestyle) points.
- SP (ranking points: 4–1 or 1–4) – Technical superiority – the loser with technical points and a margin of victory of at least 8 (Greco-Roman) or 10 (freestyle) points.

Freestyle

Athlete	Event	Round of 16	Quarterfinal	Semifinal	Repechage	Final / BM	
Athlete	Event	Opposition Result	Opposition Result	Opposition Result	Opposition Result	Opposition Result	Rank
Arsen Harutyunyan	Men's −57 kg	Erdenebat (MGL); L 1–3 ^{PP}	Did not advance				13
Vazgen Tevanyan	Men's −65 kg	Rashidov (ROC); L 0–3 ^{PO}	Did not advance				15

Greco-Roman

Athlete	Event	Round of 16	Quarterfinal	Semifinal	Repechage	Final / BM	
Athlete	Event	Opposition Result	Opposition Result	Opposition Result	Opposition Result	Opposition Result	Rank
Armen Melikyan	Men's −60 kg	Nejati (IRI); W 5–5 ^{PP}	Temirov (UKR); L 4–8 ^{PP}	Did not advance			8
Karen Aslanyan	Men's −67 kg	Korpási (HUN); W 3–1 ^{PP}	El-Sayed (EGY); L 1–3 ^{PP}	Did not advance			9
Karapet Chalyan	Men's −77 kg	Berdimuratov (UZB); W 3–0 ^{PO}	Chekhirkin (ROC); W 3–1 ^{PP}	Makhmudov (KGZ); L 1–3 ^{PP}	Bye	Huseynov (AZE); L 1–3 ^{PP}	5
Artur Aleksanyan	Men's −97 kg	Dzhuzupbekov (KGZ); W 3–1 ^{PP}	Savolainen (FIN); W 3–1 ^{PP}	Saravi (IRI); W 3–1 ^{PP}	Bye	Evloev (ROC); L 1–3 ^{PP}	2nd place, silver medalist(s)

== See also ==
- Armenia at the 2020 Summer Paralympics
