= Eumir Marcial =

Filipino boxer (born 1995)

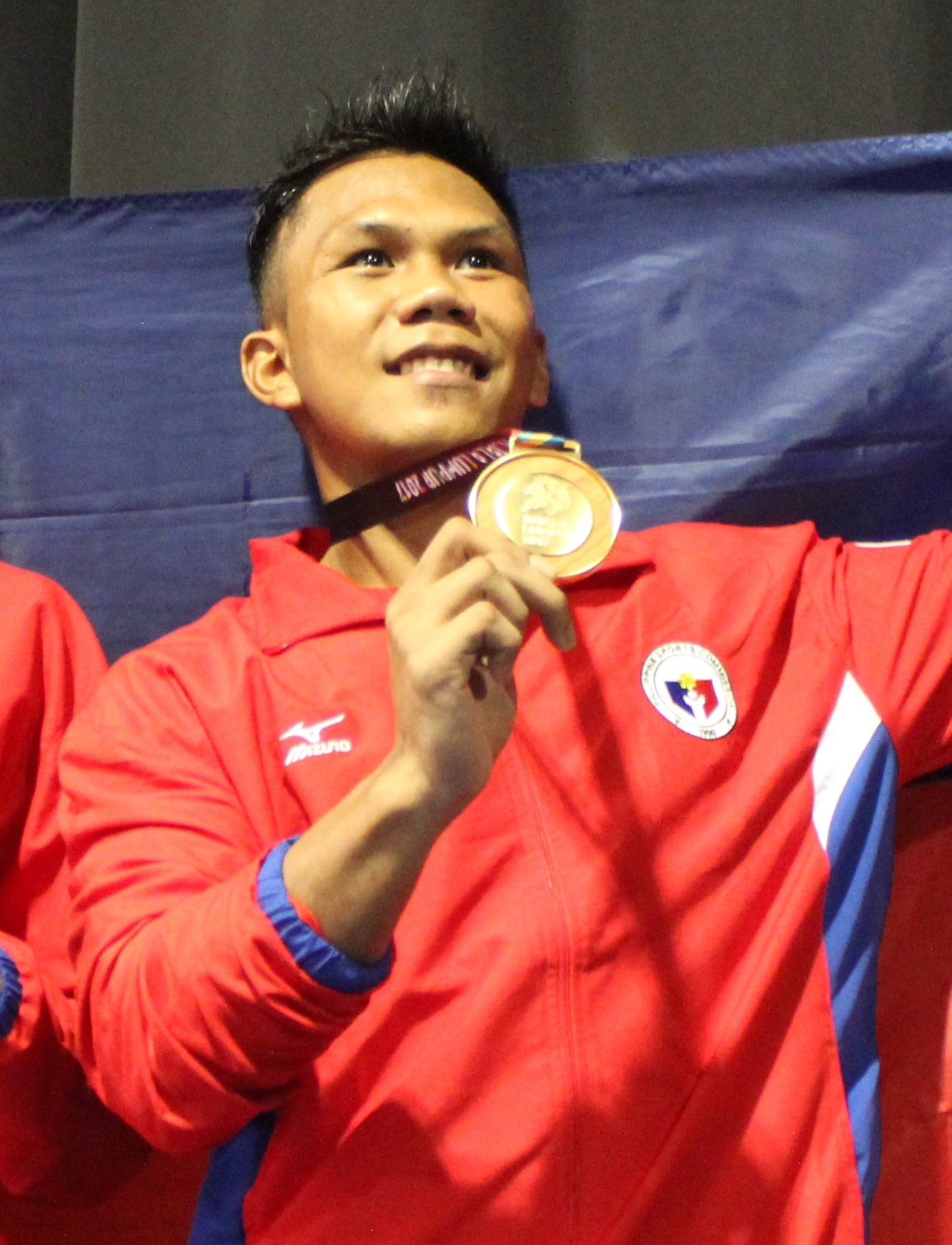
- Marcial with his gold medal at the 2017 Southeast Asian Games

Personal information
- Nationality: Filipino
- Born: October 29, 1995 (age 30) Zamboanga City, Philippines
- Height: 1.80 m (5 ft 11 in)

Boxing career
- Stance: Southpaw

Boxing record
- Total fights: 8
- Wins: 8
- Win by KO: 5
- Losses: 0
Medal record
Men's amateur boxing
Representing Philippines
Event	1st	2nd	3rd
Olympic Games	0	0	1
World Championships	0	1	0
Youth World Championships	1	0	0
2020 Asia & Oceania Boxing Olympic Qualification Tournament	1	0	0
Asian Games	0	1	1
Asian Championships	0	1	1
Southeast Asian Games	5	0	0
Asian Youth Championships	1	0	0
Total	8	3	3
Olympic Games
Bronze medal – third place	2020 Tokyo	Middleweight
World Championships
Silver medal – second place	2019 Yekaterinburg	Middleweight
Youth World Championships
Gold medal – first place	2011 Astana	Flyweight
2020 Asia & Oceania Boxing Olympic Qualification Tournament
Gold medal – first place	2020 Amman	Middleweight
Asian Games
Silver medal – second place	2022 Hangzhou	Light heavyweight
Bronze medal – third place	2018 Jakarta–Palembang	Middleweight
Asian Championships
Silver medal – second place	2015 Bangkok	Welterweight
Bronze medal – third place	2021 Dubai	Middleweight
Southeast Asian Games
Gold medal – first place	2015 Singapore	Welterweight
Gold medal – first place	2017 Kuala Lumpur	Middleweight
Gold medal – first place	2019 Philippines	Middleweight
Gold medal – first place	2021 Hanoi	Middleweight
Gold medal – first place	2025 Bangkok–Chonburi	Light heavyweight
Asian Youth Championships
Gold medal – first place	2013 Subic Bay	Light-welterweight

Eumir Felix de los Santos Marcial (born October 29, 1995) is a Filipino boxer. While representing the Philippines as an amateur, he won a silver medal at the 2019 World Championships and bronze at the 2020 Summer Olympics, both in the middleweight division.

Marcial turned professional in July 2020 but continues to representing his country in amateur tournaments.

Aside from boxing, he has also pursued a basketball career.

== Early life and education ==
Eumir Felix Marcial was born on October 29, 1995, in Lunzuran in Zamboanga City, Philippines. He is the youngest of five children of Eulalio and Carmelita Marcial. His father, a coach for the Universidad de Zamboanga Boxing Club, introduced him to boxing at the age of seven and allowed him to compete in the Beer na Beer Tournament at Plaza Pershing. He was inspired to take up boxing after following the example of his cousin, Anthony Marcial.

Marcial attended Putik Central School before enrolling at Maria Clara Lobregat National High School, where he completed his first two years of secondary education. At the age of 15, the Philippine Sports Commission arranged for him to transfer to Pasay City West High School in Metro Manila. However, he reportedly resumed his high school studies at the University of Baguio for the remaining two years. He later studied for a semester at the university's School of International Hospitality and Tourism Management.

== Amateur career ==
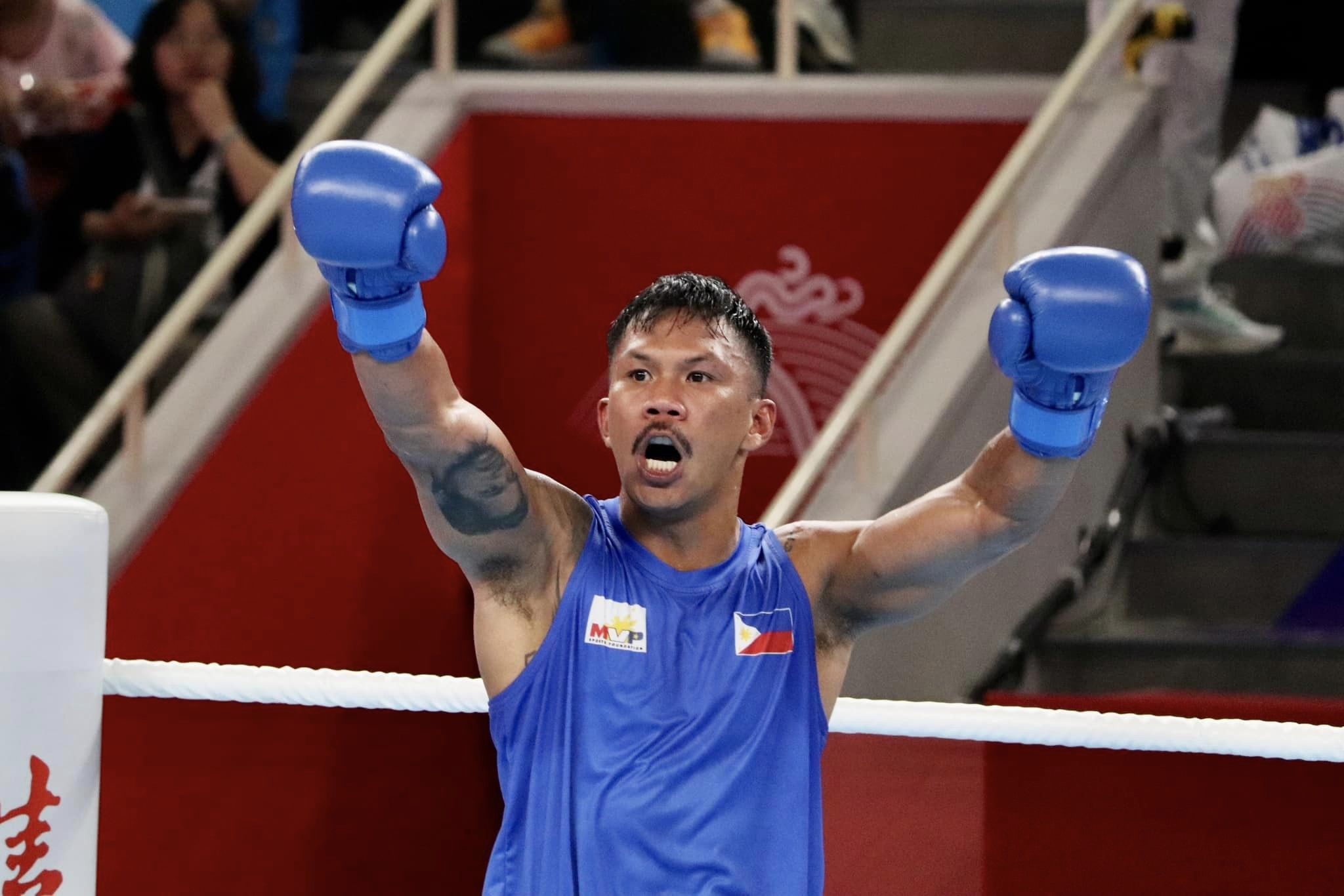
Marcial at the 19th Asian Games in Hangzhou, China

Marcial started competitive boxing in hometown of Zamboanga City with his father Eulalio being his first coach. He competed in local fiesta tournaments such as the Golpe Golpe de Barangay.

Marcial was invited to join the Philippine national team at age 14. His first international tournament was the 2011 IBA Junior World Championships in Astana, Kazakhstan where he won a gold medal in the light bantamweight division. He was awarded the Best Asia Youth Boxer of the Year in 2013. Marcial won the gold medal in his weight class at the 2015 Southeast Asian Games, and earned a silver medal in the ASBC Asian Confederation Boxing Championships."

At the 2019 AIBA World Boxing Championships in Ekaterinburg, Russia, Marcial settled for silver in the middleweight category losing to Russian boxer Gleb Bakshi in the final bout.

He failed to qualify for the 2016 Summer Olympics in Rio de Janeiro. However he managed to qualify for the 2020 Summer Olympics which was later postponed to 2021 due to the COVID-19 pandemic.

He qualified for the Middleweight event for the 2020 Summer Olympics in Tokyo. He faced off against Algerian boxer Younes Nemouchi on Round of 16 as he won the round easily by a TKO. He advanced to fight Armenian boxer Arman Darchinyan by a KO after Darchinyan fell from Marcial's punch. Marcial was able to advance to the semifinals against Ukrainian boxer Oleksandr Khyzhniak and lost to a split decision. Marcial brought home a bronze medal as a result.

Marcial was scheduled to compete at the 2026 Asian Games in Japan but later withdrew. He had recently scored a knockout victory over Omar Ulises Huerta in a professional bout. Although he would have been able to compete at the continental Games, Marcial determined that the short turnaround posed too great a risk to his health and safety.

== Professional career ==
As early as 2020, Marcial has been receiving major offers from professional boxing promoters, encouraging him to turn pro. Among the organizations that caught his interest is MP Promotions of Manny Pacquiao. The offers are significant enough, which promises Marcial as much as "tens of millions of pesos" before even each match begins, to warrant a response from the Association of Boxing Alliances in the Philippines to appeal to promoters to allow him to compete in the 2020 Summer Olympics, something that Marcial promised to his father. In July 2020, Marcial turned pro and signed in with MP Promotions although he has pledged to continue to represent the Philippines in international amateur competitions such as the Southeast Asian Games and the Summer Olympics.

Marcial signed with the Premier Boxing Champions (PBC) and his professional match will be a four-round middleweight bout against Andrew Whitfield from Lewiston, Idaho. The bout will be part of a PBC event to be held on December 16, 2020, at the Microsoft Theater in Los Angeles. For two months prior to the fight, Marcial trained under Freddie Roach at Wild Card Boxing Club.

Marcial faced Bernard Joseph in an eight-round welterweight bout at MGM Grand Garden Arena in Las Vegas, on July 19, 2025. Marcial KO'd Bernard Joseph in the 3rd Round.

At the Thrilla in Manila II, the golden anniversary for the fight of the same name, at the Araneta Coliseum in Quezon City, Marcial fought Venezuelan boxer Eddy Colmenares for the vacant WBC International Middleweight Championship. Marcial won the ten-round bout via a majority decision claiming the vacant title.

He had a ten-month hiatus from professional boxing starting from October 2025. He returned on September 19, 2026, knocking out Omar Ulises Huerta in the third round, keeping his undefeated streak.

== Personal life ==
Eumir Marcial joined the Philippine Air Force in 2013, becoming an organic personnel of its Civil Military Operations Group. As of 2021, Marcial holds the rank of sergeant.

Marcial's cousin Anthony is a professional boxer, who has also represented the Philippines at the 2006 Asian Games. His eldest brother Eliver died in October 2020.

Marcial is married to Princess Jenniel Galarpe, a fellow boxer from Cagayan de Oro and of a family of boxers. They married after his stint in the 2021 Olympics. In January 2025, Princess sued Eumir for abuse, infidelity, and manipulative behavior, saying that she had caught him with a mistress in October 2024. Eumir denies the claim insisting that he was the abuse victim and has been estranged with his wife before the 2024 Summer Olympics and that the alleged mistress is merely a friend.

== In popular media ==
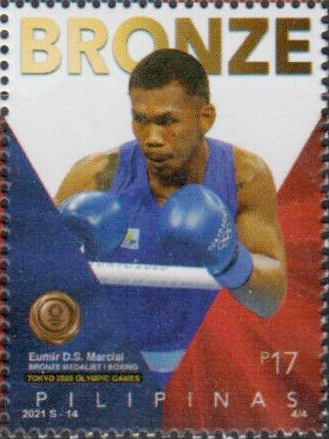
Marcial on a 2021 stamp of the Philippines

In 2021, Marcial made a virtual appearance in Pinoy Big Brother: Kumunity Season 10 when he gave a message of luck to the celebrity housemates prior to their land swimming competition in the Pinoy Big Brother Games 2021.

== Professional boxing record ==
8 fights	8 wins	0 losses
By knockout	5	0
By decision	3	0

No.	Result	Record	Opponent	Type	Round, time	Date	Location	Notes
8	Win	8–0	Omar Huerta	KO	3 (8), 1:44	Sep 19, 2026	Pechanga Arena, San Diego, California, U.S.	
7	Win	7–0	Eddy Colmenares	MD	10	Oct 29, 2025	Araneta Coliseum, Quezon City, Philippines	Won vacant WBC International middleweight title
6	Win	6–0	Bernard Joseph	TKO	3 (8), 1:55	Jul 19, 2025	MGM Grand Garden Arena, Paradise, Nevada, U.S.	
5	Win	5–0	Thoedsak Sinam	KO	4 (8), 1:33	Mar 23, 2024	Ninoy Aquino Stadium, Manila, Philippines	
4	Win	4–0	Ricardo Ruben Villalba	TKO	2 (8), 0:48	Feb 11, 2023	Alamodome, San Antonio, Texas, U.S.	
3	Win	3–0	Steven Pichardo	UD	6	Oct 8, 2022	Dignity Health Sports Park, Carson, California, U.S.	
2	Win	2–0	Isiah Hart	TKO	4 (4), 2:13	Apr 9, 2022	Virgin Hotels, Paradise, Nevada, U.S.	
1	Win	1–0	Andrew Whitfield	UD	4	Dec 16, 2020	Microsoft Theater, Los Angeles, California, U.S.	

== Basketball career ==
Marcial entered professional basketball for the Zamboanga Valientes of the Pilipinas VisMin Super Cup for the 2023 Fiesta Pilar Championship. In 2026, he joined the Basilan Steel of the Maharlika Pilipinas Basketball League.

Olympic Games
Preceded by Asa Miller	Flagbearer for Philippines (with Kiyomi Watanabe); Tokyo 2020	Succeeded by Asa Miller
