= Tursynbay Kulakhmet =

Kazakh boxer (born 1994)

Personal information
- Nationality: Kazakh
- Born: 27 January 1994 (age 32) Kyzylorda, Kazakhstan
- Weight: Super-welterweight

Boxing career
- Stance: Southpaw

Boxing record
- Total fights: 8
- Wins: 7
- Win by KO: 5
- Losses: 1
Medal record
Men's amateur boxing
Representing Kazakhstan
World Championships
Bronze medal – third place	2019 Yekaterinburg	Middleweight
Asian Championships
Gold medal – first place	2019 Bangkok	Middleweight

Tursynbay Kulakhmet (born 27 January 1994) is a Kazakh professional boxer. As an amateur, he won a bronze medal at the 2019 World Championships.

== Amateur career ==
=== World Championship result ===
Yekaterinburg 2019

- Round of 32: Defeated Milos Bartl (Czech Republic) 5–0
- Round of 16: Defeated Javier Martinez (USA) 5–0
- Quarter-finals: Defeated Arman Darchinyan (Armenia) 5–0
- Semi–finals: Defeated by Eumir Marcial (Philippines) 5–0

== Professional career ==
Kulakhmet made his professional debut against Sagadat Rakhmankul on 23 August 2020. Kulakhmet dominated throughout the bout and at the end of the fourth round, his opponent was forced to retire from the bout after sustaining large amounts of damage.

On 11 November 2020, Kulakhmet fought for the second time as a professional where he was taken the full distance by Macaulay McGowan. Kulakhmet controlled the duration of the bout and secured a comfortable win via unanimous decision.

== Professional boxing record ==
8 fights	7 wins	1 loss
By knockout	5	1
By decision	2	0

No.	Result	Record	Opponent	Type	Round, time	Date	Location	Notes
8	Win	7–1	Robert Talarek	TKO	4 (6), 2:12	26 Apr 2024	(United Kingdom) Knowsley Leisure & Culture Park, Huyton, England	
7	Win	6–1	Fouad El Massoudi	PTS	6	16 Dec 2023	(United Kingdom) Beacon of Light, Sunderland, England	
6	Win	5–1	Joel Julio	KO	2 (8), 2:58	22 Jul 2023	Dubai Studio City, Dubai, United Arab Emirates	
5	Loss	4–1	Juan Carlos Abreu	KO	7 (10), 1:34	29 Oct 2021	York Hall, London, England	Lost WBC International super-welterweight title
4	Win	4–0	Aleksei Evchenko	TKO	10 (10), 1:57	10 Jul 2021	Baluan Sholak Sports Palace, Almaty, Kazakhstan	
3	Win	3–0	Heber Rondon	KO	1 (10), 1:40	3 Apr 2021	Caesars Palace Bluewaters, Dubai, United Arab Emirates	Retained WBC International super-welterweight title
2	Win	2–0	Macaulay McGowan	UD	10	11 Nov 2020	Production Park Studios, South Kirkby, England	Won vacant WBC International super-welterweight title
1	Win	1–0	Sagadat Rakhmankul	RTD	4 (8), 3:00	23 Aug 2020	Tynyshpayev Academy of Transport and Communications, Almaty, Kazakhstan	

Sporting positions
Regional boxing titles
Vacant Title last held by Abass Baraou	WBC International super-welterweight champion 11 November 2020 – 29 October 2021	Next: Juan Carlos Abreu
