= Boxing at the 2019 European Games – Men's 60 kg =

Boxing competitions

Men's lightweight boxing at the 2019 European Games
- Venue: Uruchie Sports Palace
- Date: 22–29 June
- Competitors: 27 from 27 nations

Medalists
gold medal	Dzmitry Asanau	Belarus
silver medal	Gabil Mamedov	Russia
bronze medal	Karen Tonakanyan	Armenia
bronze medal	Otar Eranosyan	Georgia

The men's lightweight 60 kg boxing event at the 2019 European Games in Minsk was held from 22 to 29 June at the Uruchie Sports Palace.

== Results ==
=== Final ===
Final; 29 June
Dzmitry Asanau (BLR)	4
Gabil Mamedov (RUS)	1

=== Top half ===
Round of 32; 22 June
Vasile Suciu (ROU)	3
Radomir Obruśniak (POL)	2
Jasin Ljama (MKD)	0
Tadej Černoga (SLO)	5
Viliam Tankó (SVK)	0
Dzmitry Asanau (BLR)	5
Ahmet Simsek (AUT)	0
Cristian Eusse (ESP)	5
Kiril Rusinov (BUL)	2
Francesco Maietta (ITA)	3

Round of 16; 25 June
Iurii Shestak (UKR)	5
Vasile Suciu (ROU)	0
Tadej Černoga (SLO)
Dzmitry Asanau (BLR)	RSC
Karen Tonakanyan (ARM)	5
Cristian Eusse (ESP)	0
Francesco Maietta (ITA)	1
Calum French (GBR)	4

Quarterfinals; 26 June
Iurii Shestak (UKR)	1
Dzmitry Asanau (BLR)	4
Karen Tonakanyan (ARM)	3
Calum French (GBR)	2

Semifinals; 28 June
Dzmitry Asanau (BLR)	4
Karen Tonakanyan (ARM)	1

=== Bottom half ===
Round of 32; 22 June
Edgaras Skurdelis (LTU)	RSC
Valeri Tsernoglavski (EST)
Artur Szachbazian (CZE)	0
Hamsat Shadalov (GER)	5
Hakan Doğan (TUR)	5
Arslan Khataev (FIN)	0
Javid Chalabiyev (AZE)	5
Nikola Ivković (BIH)	0
Dorin Bucşa (MDA)	4
Roland Gálos (HUN)	1
Nemanja Gavrilović (SRB)	0
Jordan Rodriguez (FRA)	5

Round of 16; 25 June
Gabil Mamedov (RUS)	5
Edgaras Skurdelis (LTU)	0
Hamsat Shadalov (GER)	5
Hakan Doğan (TUR)	0
Javid Chalabiyev (AZE)	5
Dorin Bucşa (MDA)	0
Jordan Rodriguez (FRA)	0
Otar Eranosyan (GEO)	5

Quarterfinals; 26 June
Gabil Mamedov (RUS)	5
Hamsat Shadalov (GER)	0
Javid Chalabiyev (AZE)	2
Otar Eranosyan (GEO)	3

Semifinals; 28 June
Gabil Mamedov (RUS)	5
Otar Eranosyan (GEO)	0
