= Eldric Sella =

Venezuelan boxer (born 1997)

Eldric Sella OLY
Personal information
- Born: 24 January 1997 (age 29) Caracas, Venezuela

Sport
- Sport: Boxing

Eldric Samuel Sella Rodríguez (born 24 January 1997) is a Venezuelan boxer. He competed in the men's middleweight event at the 2020 Summer Olympics, representing the IOC Refugee Olympic Team.

Sella has competed as a refugee after fleeing Venezuela and seeking asylum in Trinidad and Tobago in 2018. Until 2014, he had competed for Venezuela with his father as his coach. Soon after being granted asylum, his family joined him. Sella has said that he hopes to inspire Venezuelan refugees around the world to know that they can succeed.
