= Emmet Brennan =

Irish boxer (born 1991)

Personal information
- Nationality: Irish
- Born: 4 May 1991 (age 35)
- Weight: Light-heavyweight; Middleweight

Boxing career

Boxing record
- Total fights: 4
- Wins: 4
- Win by KO: 1
Medal record
Men's amateur boxing
Representing Ireland
Irish National Championships
Gold medal – first place	2020 Irish National Championships	Middleweight
Silver medal – second place	2019 Irish National Championships	Middleweight
Gold medal – first place	2017 Irish National Championships	Middleweight

Emmet Brennan (born 4 May 1991) is an Irish boxer. He competed in the men's light heavyweight event at the 2020 Summer Olympics.

== Amateur boxing career ==
Emmet started boxing at the age of 10. In the Irish National Boxing Championships Brennan won silver in 2019, sandwiched by gold medals in 2017 and 2020. In the 2020 European Boxing Olympic Qualification Tournament he qualified for the 2020 Summer Olympics by defeating Liridon Nuha in a box-off bout. In the Olympics, Brennan was eliminated from the tournament in the Round of 32 by Dilshodbek Ruzmetov.

== Professional boxing career ==
Following the 2020 Summer Olympics, Brennan developed a drinking problem due to difficulties in recovering from a shoulder surgery. However, he eventually sobered up, got into contact with Darren Barker and embarked on a career in professional boxing. As of October 2024, Brennan had racked a record of 4–0 in his tenure in professional boxing.

== Professional boxing record ==
4 fights	4 wins	0 losses
By knockout	1	0
By decision	3	0

No.	Result	Record	Opponent	Type	Round, time	Date	Location	Notes
4	Win	4–0	Kevin Cronin	SD	8	20 Sep 2024	3Arena, Dublin, Ireland	
3	Win	3–0	Devaun Lee	MD	8	7 Mar 2024	Sony Hall, New York, United States	
2	Win	2–0	Jamie Morrissey	TKO	8, 2:12	25 Nov 2023	3Arena, Dublin, Ireland	
1	Win	1–0	Angel Petkov Emilov	PTS	6	1 Jul 2023	Europa Hotel, Belfast, Northern Ireland	
