= Aaron Prince =

Trinidad and Tobago boxer (born 1986)

Personal information
- Born: 9 January 1986 (age 40) Trinidad and Tobago
- Weight: Light middleweight, Middleweight

Boxing career

Aaron Prince (born 9 January 1986) is a Trinidad and Tobago boxer. He competed in the men's middleweight event at the 2020 Summer Olympics.
