= Ammar Abduljabbar =

German boxer (born 1995)

Personal information
- Full name: Ammar Riad Abduljabbar
- Nationality: German
- Born: 1 October 1995 (age 29); Basra, Iraq

Sport
- Sport: Boxing

Ammar Riad Abduljabbar (born 1 October 1995) is a German boxer. He competed in the men's heavyweight event at the 2020 Summer Olympics.

A native of Iraq, he moved to Hamburg in 2010 and became a German citizen in 2018.
