= Shahin Mousavi =

Iranian boxer (born 1994)

Personal information
- Full name: Seyed Shahin Mousavi
- Nationality: Iranian
- Born: 25 April 1994 (age 32) Tehran, Iran
- Website: Official Instagram Profile

Sport
- Sport: Boxing
- Coached by: Alireza Esteki
Medal record
Men's amateur boxing
Representing Iran
Asian Championships
| Bronze medal – third place | 2019 Bangkok | Middleweight |
| Bronze medal – third place | 2021 Dubai | Middleweight |
| Bronze medal – third place | 2022 Amman | Middleweight |

Seyed Shahin Mousavi (Persian: سیدشاهین موسوی; born 25 April 1994) is an Iranian boxer. He competed in the men's middleweight event at the 2020 Summer Olympics.
