= Yaroslav Khartsyz =

Ukrainian boxer (born 1997)

Personal information
- Born: 7 May 1997 (age 29) Kharkiv, Ukraine
- Height: 175 cm (5 ft 9 in)

Boxing career

Boxing record
- Total fights: 7
- Wins: 7
- Win by KO: 6

Yaroslav Khartsyz (Ukrainian: Ярослав Сергійович Харциз; born 7 May 1997) is a Ukrainian boxer. He competed in the men's lightweight event at the 2020 Summer Olympics.

== Professional boxing record ==
| 8 fights | 8 wins | 0 losses |
|---|---|---|
| By knockout | 7 | 0 |
| By decision | 1 | 0 |

| No. | Result | Record | Opponent | Type | Round, time | Date | Location | Notes |
|---|---|---|---|---|---|---|---|---|
| 8 | Win | 8–0 | Franco Andres Cajal | KO | 2 (8), 1:13 | 11 Oct 2025 | Palace of Sports, Kyiv, Ukraine | |
| 7 | Win | 7–0 | Dastan Saduuly | RTD | 1 (8) 3:00 | 7 Jun 2025 | Palace of Sports, Kyiv, Ukraine | |
| 6 | Win | 6–0 | Ronan Nahuel Sanchez | KO | 3 (8) 0:47 | 1 Mar 2025 | Stereo Plaza, Kyiv, Ukraine | |
| 5 | Win | 5–0 | Alan Sebastian Velasquez | TKO | 2 (8) 2:16 | 28 Sep 2024 | Emily Resort, Lviv, Ukraine | |
| 4 | Win | 4–0 | Artem Ayvazidi | RTD | 2 (6) 3:00 | 9 Dec 2023 | AKKO International, Kyiv, Ukraine | |
| 3 | Win | 3–0 | Konrad Czajkowski | UD | 4 | 26 Aug 2023 | Stadion Wrocław, Wrocław, Poland | |
| 2 | Win | 2–0 | Petr Randysek | TKO | 1 (4) 0:37 | 15 Apr 2023 | PGE Turów Arena, Zgorzelec, Poland | |
| 1 | Win | 1–0 | Marian Wesołowski | TKO | 2 (4) 2:33 | 28 Jan 2023 | Hala Sportowa, Nowy Sącz, Poland | |
