= Cosmin Gîrleanu =

Romanian boxer (born 1999)

Cosmin Petre Gîrleanu
Personal information
- Nationality: Romanian
- Born: 3 June 1999 (age 27) Hunedoara, Romania
- Height: 5 ft 3 in (160 cm)
- Weight: Light flyweight; Flyweight

Boxing career
- Stance: Southpaw

Boxing record
- Total fights: 4
- Wins: 4
- Win by KO: 1
- Losses: 0
Medal record
Men's amateur boxing
Representing United States
Junior World Championships
Gold medal – first place	2015 St. Petersburg	Pinweight

Cosmin Gîrleanu (born 3 June 1999) is a Romanian boxer. He competed in the men's flyweight event at the 2020 Summer Olympics, as well as winning a gold medal at the 2015 Junior World Championships.

== Professional boxing record ==
4 fights	4 wins	0 losses
By knockout	1	0
By decision	3	0

No.	Result	Record	Opponent	Type	Round, time	Date	Location	Notes
4	Win	4-0	Andre Rodriguez Rayon	UD	6	Feb 3, 2024	San Nicolás de los Garza, Nuevo León, Mexico	
3	Win	3–0	Miguel Luna Tlapaya	UD	6	Dec 15, 2023	Auditorio Fausto Gutierrez Moreno, Tijuana, Mexico	
2	Win	2–0	Jesus Flores Rodriguez	UD	6	Apr 15, 2023	Arena México, Mexico City, Mexico	
1	Win	1–0	Hever Jesus Perez Bojorquez	TKO	2 (6), 1:40	Jan 21, 2023	Arena La Paz, La Paz, Mexico	
