= Aliaksandr Radzionau =

Belarusian boxer (born 2000)

Personal information
- Nationality: Belarusian
- Born: 14 June 2000 (age 26)

Sport
- Sport: Boxing

Aliaksandr Radzionau (Belarusian: Аляксандр Радзіонаў; born 14 June 2000) is a Belarusian boxer. He competed in the men's welterweight event at the 2020 Summer Olympics.
