= Ivan Veriasov =

Russian boxer (born 1993)

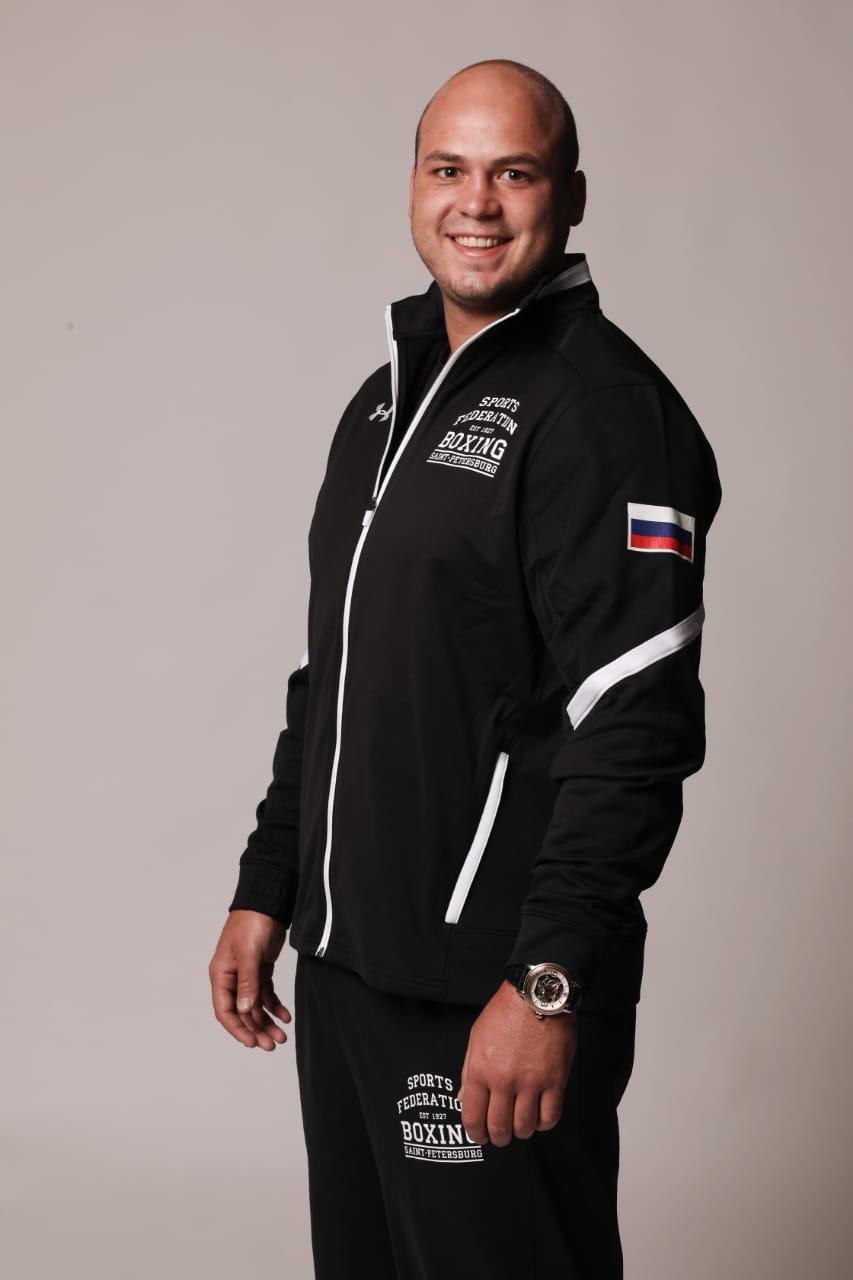
- Veriasov in 2018

Personal information
- Nationality: Russia
- Born: 10 July 1993 (age 32) Nakhodka, Russia

Boxing career

Boxing record
- Total fights: 94
- Wins: 68
- Win by KO: 1
- Losses: 26
- Draws: 0
- No contests: 0

Ivan Yuryevich Veriasov (Russian: Иван Юрьевич Верясов; born 10 July 1993) is a Russian boxer. He competed in the 2020 Summer Olympics.
