= Roland Gálos =

Hungarian boxer (born 1995)

Personal information
- Born: 26 May 1995 (age 29)

Sport
- Country: Hungary
- Sport: Boxing

Roland Gálos (born 26 May 1995) is a Hungarian boxer. He competed in the men's featherweight event at the 2020 Summer Olympics held in Tokyo, Japan.

In 2019, he competed in the men's 60 kg event at the 2019 European Games held in Minsk, Belarus.
