= Michael Nevin (boxer) =

Irish boxer (born 1998)

Personal information
- Nationality: Irish
- Born: 6 May 1998 (age 28) Republic of Ireland
- Weight: Middleweight

Boxing career
- Stance: Southpaw
Medal record
Men's amateur boxing
Representing Ireland
European Games
Bronze medal – third place	2019 Minsk	Middleweight
World Youth Championships
Bronze medal – third place	2016 Saint Petersburg	Middleweight

Michael Anthony Nevin (born 6 May 1998) is an Irish amateur boxer.

== Early life ==
Nevin is a native of County Laois, and a cousin of Olympic medallist John Joe Nevin.

== Career ==
Nevin boxes at Portlaoise Boxing Club.

Nevin won bronze at the 2019 European Games in Minsk.
