= Francisco Verón =

Argentine boxer (born 1998)

Personal information
- Full name: Francisco Daniel Verón
- Born: 28 October 1998 (age 27) Buenos Aires, Argentina
- Height: 5 ft 10 in (178 cm)
- Weight: Super-welterweight, Middleweight

Boxing career
- Stance: Orthodox

Boxing record
- Total fights: 20
- Wins: 17
- Win by KO: 10
- Losses: 2
- Draws: 1
- No contests: 0

Francisco Daniel Verón (born 28 October 1998) is an Argentine professional boxer. He is a former WBC Latino super-welterweight champion. As an amateur he competed in the men's middleweight event at the delayed 2020 Summer Olympics.
