= Giorgi Kharabadze =

Georgian boxer (born 1997)

Personal information
- Nationality: Georgian
- Born: 11 May 1997 (age 27); Kutaisi, Georgia

Sport
- Sport: Boxing

Giorgi Kharabadze (born 11 May 1997) is a Georgian boxer. He competed in the men's middleweight event at the 2020 Summer Olympics.
