= Younes Nemouchi =

Algerian boxer (born 1993)

Personal information
- Nationality: Algerian
- Born: 16 September 1993 (age 32)

Sport
- Sport: Boxing
Medal record
Representing Algeria
Men's amateur boxing
Mediterranean Games
Silver medal – second place	2022 Oran	Middleweight

Younes Nemouchi (born 16 September 1993) is an Algerian boxer. He competed in the men's middleweight event at the 2020 Summer Olympics.
