= Fanat Kakhramonov =

Uzbekistani boxer (born 1996)

Personal information
- Nationality: Uzbekistani
- Born: 23 December 1996 (age 28); Samarkand, Uzbekistan

Sport
- Sport: Boxing

Fanat Kakhramonov (born 23 December 1996) is an Uzbekistani boxer. He competed in the men's middleweight event at the 2020 Summer Olympics.
