= Hamsat Shadalov =

German boxer (born 1998)

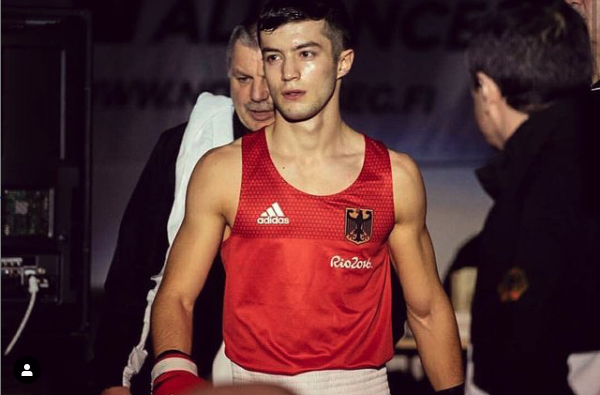

Personal information
- Nationality: German
- Born: 14 October 1998 (age 26); Grozny, Russia

Sport
- Sport: Boxing

Hamsat Shadalov (born 14 October 1998) is a German boxer. He competed in the men's featherweight event at the 2020 Summer Olympics.
