= Vitali Bandarenka =

Belarusian boxer (born 1985)

Personal information
- Nationality: Belarusian
- Born: 2 October 1985 (age 39); Khoyniki, Belarus

Sport
- Sport: Boxing

Vitali Bandarenka (Belarusian: Віталь Бандарэнка; born 2 October 1985) is a Belarusian boxer. He competed in the men's middleweight event at the 2020 Summer Olympics.
