= Mindaugas Gedminas =

Amateur boxer (born 1996)

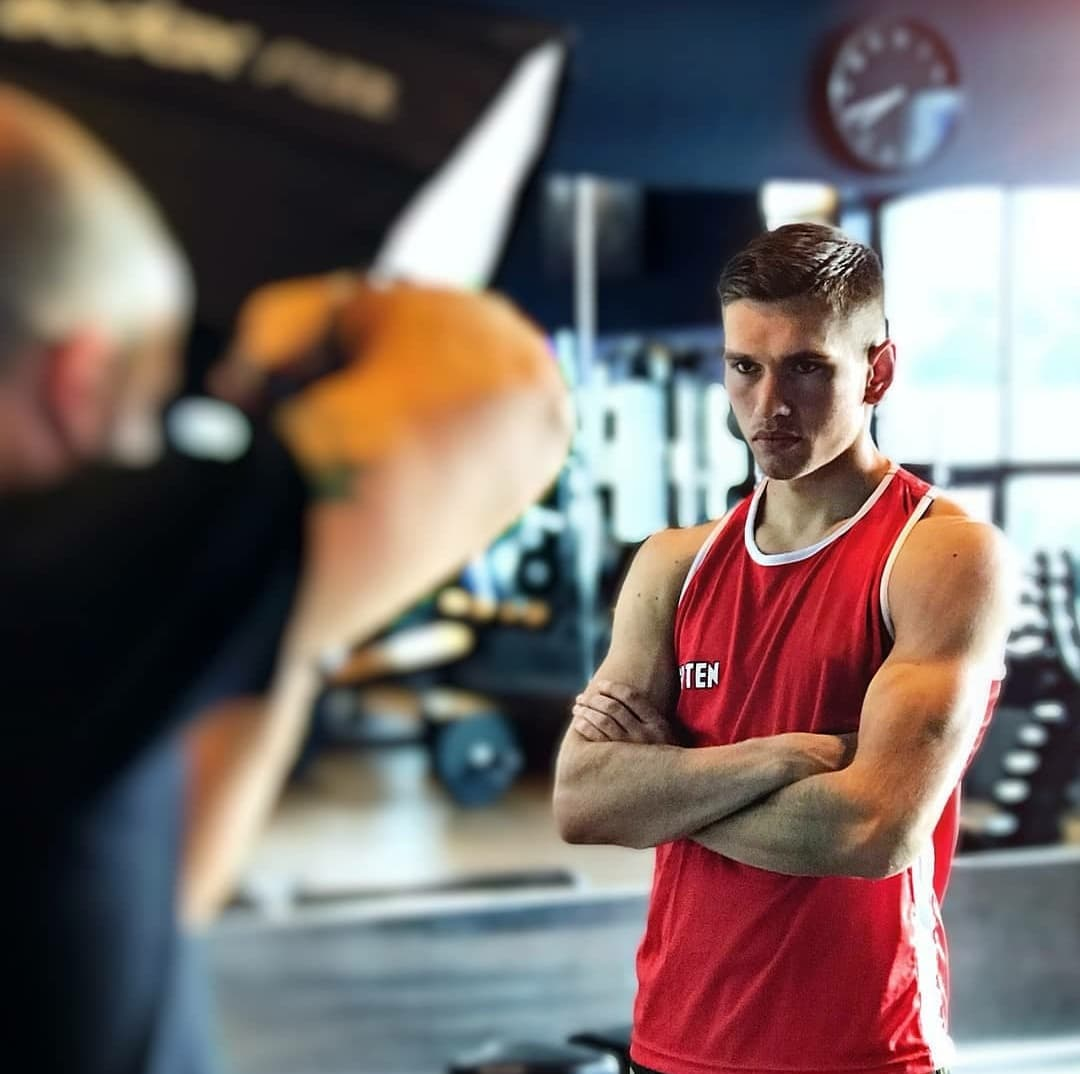
- Gedminas in 2019

Personal information
- Nationality: Norwegian
- Born: 13 September 1996 (age 29) Šiauliai, Lithuania
- Height: 189 cm (6 ft 2 in)

Sport
- Sport: Boxing
- Event: Middleweight-Light Heavyweight

Mindaugas Gedminas (born 13 September 1996) is a Norwegian amateur boxer. He is a Four-time Norwegian champion, Four-time Scandinavian boxing champion and claimed 5th place in Men's European Boxing Championships 2022 Armenia, Yerevan. He also represented Norway at the 2021 World Boxing Championships, 2021 Olympic Qualifiers in Paris, European Games 2023, Krakow and 2019 European Games and the European Olympic Qualifications 2020.

He represented Norway at London 2020 and Paris 2021 Olympic Qualifiers. Olympic Games 2021. He attended the Olympic Qualifications in London 2020 and defeated European champion and 2016 Olympian Balazs Bacskai in his first fight.

Gedminas His style is of early Soviet boxing origins. His boxing technique comes from his Russian (Chechen) coach Zayndi Arsaev, who is a two-time Russian champion.

== Biography ==
Mindaugas Gedminas was born on 13 September 1996 in Šiauliai, Lithuania. He is of Lithuanian origin.

Mindaugas lived the first 15 years of his life in Lithuania where he also started training Judo and Muay Thai in Siauliai at the age of 12.

== Boxing career ==
Gedminas wanted to add more boxing skills to his Thai boxing career, so he decided to start training boxing in one of the oldest boxing clubs in Norway, AIK Lund. There he met his current trainer Zayindi Arsaev and found soon out that he has a better potential to perform internationally in boxing. In 2018 Mindaugas represented Norway in several international tournaments and won for the first time the Norwegian championships. He also won for the second time the Nordic championships. After that he participated in King of the Ring tournament in Sweden, where he won three fights and claimed gold medal. Gedminas also competed in Golden Glove tournament in Nis, Serbia. There he defeated Serbias number one boxer and lost the semifinals on points against a Russian opponent.

Gedminas won the 2019 Norwegian championship for the second time. He then took part in the international Grand Prix AIBA tournament, held in Usti Nad Labbern, Czech Republic. Gedminas defeated a boxer from Turkey and lost in semifinals against Salvatore Callavaro from Italy, where he won a bronze medal. Right after the tournament, Mindaugas started his preparation for the second European Games in Minsk, Belarus 2019. His preparations included training camp in Berlin, Oslo and Kristiansand. In the second European Games, Mindaugas became the first Norwegian boxer in history to take a victory there. He won against Lithuania's best boxer, Vytautas Balsys, and lost on split decision 3–2 against Salvatore Callavaro, who took a silver medal. Later that year, Gedminas went to a training camp in Lithuania, where he trained with Olympic bronze medalist 2012, Evaldas Petrauskas. Gedminas continued with his preparations for the Olympic qualifications by travelling to Nur-Sultan, Kazakhstan for two weeks training camp.
