= Adam Chartoi =

Swedish boxer (born 1997)

Personal information
- Nationality: Swedish
- Born: 17 March 1997 (age 28); Perm, Russia

Sport
- Sport: Boxing
- Weight class: Middleweight

Adam Chartoi (born 17 March 1997) is a Swedish boxer. He competed in the men's middleweight event at the 2020 Summer Olympics.
