= Salvatore Cavallaro =

Italian boxer (born 1995)

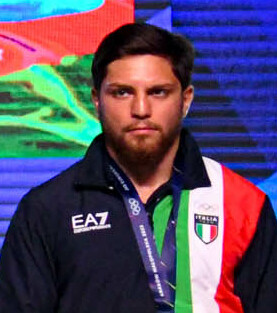
- Salvatore Cavallaro at the 2023 European Games Boxing

Personal information
- Nationality: Italy
- Born: 16 August 1995 (age 30)

Boxing career
Medal record
Men's amateur boxing
Representing Italy
IBA World Championships
Bronze medal – third place	2021 Belgrade	Middleweight
European Games
Silver medal – second place	2019 Minsk	Middleweight
Bronze medal – third place	2023 Kraków-Małopolska	Light heavyweight
European Championships
Bronze medal – third place	2015 Samokov	Middleweight
Bronze medal – third place	2017 Kharkiv	Middleweight
Bronze medal – third place	2022 Yerevan	Middleweight
Mediterranean Games
Silver medal – second place	2018 Tarragona	Middleweight
Bronze medal – third place	2022 Oran	Middleweight

Salvatore Cavallaro (born 16 August 1995) is an Italian boxer. He won three bronze medals at the European Amateur Boxing Championships in the middleweight events. He also competed at the 2021 AIBA World Boxing Championships, winning the bronze medal in the middleweight event.
