= Andrej Csemez =

Slovak boxer (born 1998)

Personal information
- Nickname: Bandi
- Nationality: Slovak
- Born: 6 May 1998 (age 28) Dolné Saliby, Slovakia
- Height: 6 ft 1 in (185 cm)
- Weight: Middleweight

Boxing career
Medal record
Men's amateur boxing
Representing Slovakia
European Games
Bronze medal – third place	2019 Minsk	Middleweight
European Union Championships
Gold medal – first place	2018 Valladolid	Middleweight
European Olympic Qualification Tournament
Bronze medal – third place	2021 Paris	Middleweight
European Youth Championships
Bronze medal – third place	2016 Anapa	Welterweight

Andrej Csemez (Hungarian: Csemez András; born 6 May 1998) is a Slovak amateur boxer who fights out of KO Box Club Galanta. He is a member of the Hungarian community in Slovakia.

Andrej won a bronze medal at the 2019 European Games and a gold at the 2018 European Union Championships, both at middleweight. In addition, he competed at two World Championships in 2017 and 2019.

== Amateur career ==
Csemez started boxing at the age of 12 when a boxing gym, KO Box Club, was opened up in Galanta near his village by legendary boxer and former world lightweight title challenger Tomáš Kovács. Although he had also showed interest in football and judo, he began personally training under Kovács soon thereafter.

In 2015, he won a gold medal at the Julius Torma Youth Memorial in Prague, and was presented an award by the Czech Olympic Committee for his performance. The following week he placed first in the welterweight event at the Slovak National Youth Championships, and was subsequently given the most technical boxer award. At the end of the year Csemez competed at his first European Youth Championships, where he won his first bout before falling to Bibert Tumenov of Russia.

The following year he repeated his gold medal-winning performance at the Julius Torma Youth Memorial. At the 2016 European Youth Championships in Russia that summer, he won three matches before losing a decision to Englishman Harris Akbar in the semi-finals, taking home a bronze medal. For this achievement he was officially recognized by the president of the Slovak Boxing Federation Peter Bodoki, along with national teammates Filip Meszáros and Dávid Michálek. Csemez began his campaign at that year's World Youth Championships, also in Russia, with a controversial decision victory over medal favorite Brett McGinty. He was eliminated by Isami Mesa of Cuba in the next round. He closed out the year by moving up to middleweight and competing at the National Championships, where he won a gold medal in the senior division. He was also named the co-Slovak boxer of the year by the National Sports Center (NŠC), a recognition he received the following year as well.

In 2017, at his new weight class, he boxed at the European U-22 Championships in Romania, but lost his second fight to former European Youth champion Oleksandr Khyzhniak. He decisioned two fighters before losing to two-time Olympian Zoltán Harcsa in the quarterfinals of the European Championships in Ukraine. This qualified him for the World Championships in Hamburg at the age of 19; he exited with another second-round loss to Oleksandr Khyzhniak. After winning a tournament in Budapest in October 2017, Csemez was involved in a serious car accident that broke two of his cervical vertebrae and kept him out of the ring for eight months. He was knocked out by Andrej Merzlyakov in the first round of the prestigious Chemistry Cup in Germany in June 2018, then lost by referee stoppage to Nicoleto Grdovič at an international tournament in Slovakia in what was his light heavyweight debut. After this rough return, he then won a gold medal in the middleweight event at the European Union Championships in November, winning all four bouts by unanimous decision. His year ended with his second gold medal at the national championships in December.

Csemez was scheduled to compete at the 2019 European U-22 Championships in Russia, but failed a medical exam that kept him out of the ring and awarded his opponent a walkover victory. However a few weeks later he won a gold medal at the second Euro Cup in Bijeljina, Bosnia and Herzegovina in his return to light heavyweight, and was given the best boxer award. Back at middleweight, he won a bronze at the 2019 European Games, which doubled as that year's European Championships. He lost his semi-final bout to rival Oleksandr Khyzhniak – his third defeat to Khyzhniak in as many match-ups. He then had an early exit at the World Championships, losing in his second fight.

In an attempt to qualify for Tokyo 2020 he competed at the 2020 European Olympic Qualification Tournament in London. He defeated Ryszard Lewicki in the opening round and was scheduled to face Miguel Cuadrado of Spain next, but the competition was postponed after three days due to the COVID-19 pandemic. Returning from England he tested positive for the virus, becoming the first Slovak athlete to do so, and had to go into quarantine with the entire Slovak team.

=== Amateur results ===
- 2013 Junior National Championships in Giraltovce, Slovakia (flyweight)
  - Lost to Juraj Didi 1–4 (silver)
- 2013 Youth National Championships in Nové Mesto nad Váhom, Slovakia (flyweight)
  - Lost to Filip Meszaros 0–5 (bronze)
- 2014 Olympic Hopes Junior Tournament in Komárno, Slovakia (lightweight)
  - Defeated Szilard Laszlo (Hungary) 2–1
  - Defeated Osvaldas Juskevicius (Lithuania) 3–0 (gold)
- 2014 North Czech Cup in Ústí nad Labem, Czech Republic (light welterweight)
  - Lost to Eryk Apresyan (Poland) 1–2
  - Defeated Richard Olah (Hungary) 2–1 (bronze)
- 2014 European Junior Championships in Anapa, Russia (light welterweight)
  - Lost to Artur Mamberger (Germany) 0–2
- 2015 Dan Pozniak Youth Cup in Vilnius, Lithuania (welterweight)
  - Defeated Saimonas Banys (Lithuania) TKOI2
  - Defeated Nikita Lekunovich (Belarus) 2–1
  - Lost to Sebastian Wiktorzak (Poland) 0–3 (bronze)
- 2015 Olympic Hopes Tournament in Galanta, Slovakia (welterweight)
  - Defeated Mihael Jugovic (Croatia) 3–0
  - Lost to Laszlo Kozak (Hungary) (silver)
- 2015 Julius Torma Youth Memorial in Prague, Czech Republic (welterweight)
  - Defeated Sebastian Wiktorzak (Poland) 3–0
  - Defeated Saimonas Banys (Lithuania) 3–0
  - Defeated Marcel Rumpler (Austria) 3–0 (gold)
- 2015 Youth National Championships in Nitra, Slovakia (welterweight)
  - Defeated Daniel Ondrejka TKO3
  - Defeated Tomáš Vago 3–0 (gold)
- 2015 European Youth Championships in Kołobrzeg, Poland (welterweight)
  - Defeated Yunus Emre Batman (Turkey) 3–0
  - Lost to Bibert Tumenov (Russia) TKO2
- 2016 Emil Zhechev Memorial in Sofia, Bulgaria (welterweight)
  - Defeated Nikki Moeller Nielsen (Denmark) 3–0
  - Defeated Asat Bozmov (Bulgaria) 3–0
  - Lost to Josip Gecevic (Croatia) 0–3 (silver)
- 2016 Julius Torma Youth Memorial in Prague, Czech Republic (welterweight)
  - Defeated Viorel Ficiu (Romania) 3–0
  - Defeated Michal Chludil (Czech Republic) 3–0
  - Defeated Laszl Kozák (Hungary) 3–0 (gold)
- 2016 European Youth Championships in Anapa, Russia (welterweight)
  - Defeated Djordje Bujisic (Serbia) 3–0
  - Defeated Daniel Levin (Israel) 3–0
  - Defeated Konstantin Kostenko (Ukraine) 3–0
  - Lost to Harris Akbar (England) 0–3 (bronze)
- 2016 Youth World Championships in Saint Petersburg, Russia (welterweight)
  - Defeated Brett McGinty (Ireland) 3–2
  - Lost to Isami Mesa (Cuba) 1–4
- 2016 National Championships in Nitra, Slovakia (middleweight)
  - Defeated Dominik Dolinaj 3–0 (gold)
- 2017 Istvan Bocskai Memorial in Debrecen, Hungary (middleweight)
  - Defeated Viktor Árpád (Hungary) 5–0
  - Lost to Birol Aygun (Turkey) 2–3
- 2017 European U-22 Championships in Brăila, Romania (middleweight)
  - Defeated Viktor Árpád (Hungary) AB3
  - Lost to Oleksandr Khyzhniak (Ukraine) AB3
- 2017 European Championships in Kharkiv, Ukraine (middleweight)
  - Defeated Andreas Kokkinos (Cyprus) 5–0
  - Defeated Vitaliy Bondarenko (Belarus) 5–0
  - Lost to Zoltán Harcsa (Hungary) 0–5
- 2017 World Championships in Hamburg, Germany (middleweight)
  - Defeated Lee Dong-Jin (South Korea) 5–0
  - Lost to Oleksandr Khyzhniak (Ukraine) 0–4
- 2017 Istvan Szechenyi Memorial in Budapest, Hungary (middleweight)
  - Defeated Viktor Árpád (Hungary) 5–0
  - Defeated Isaac Oroyovwe (Hungary) 5–0 (gold)
- 2018 Chemistry Cup in Halle, Germany (middleweight)
  - Lost Andrej Merzlyakov (Germany) KO2
- 2018 Grand Prix in Nitra, Slovakia (light heavyweight)
  - Lost to Nicoleto Grdovič (Croatia)
- 2018 European Union Championships in Valladolid, Spain (middleweight)
  - Defeated Muhammad Abdilrasoon (Finland) 5–0
  - Defeated Bengoro Bamba (France) 5–0
  - Defeated Victor Corobcevschii (Moldova) 5–0
  - Defeated Carl Fail (England) 5–0 (gold)
- 2018 National Championships in Nitra, Slovakia (middleweight)
  - Defeated Adrian Hodasi 5–0
  - Defeated Lukas Kormancik 5–0 (gold)
- 2019 Euro Cup in Bijeljina, Bosnia and Herzegovina (light heavyweight)
  - Defeated Kalamaras Polyneikis (Greece) 3–0
  - Defeated Tayson Alaoma (Italy) 3–0
  - Defeated Radenko Tomić (Bosnia and Herzegovina) ABD3 (gold)
- 2019 European Games in Minsk, Belarus (middleweight)
  - Defeated Arthur Beck (Germany) 3–2
  - Defeated Victor Carapcevschi (Moldova) 3–2
  - Defeated Miguel Cuadrado (Spain) 4–1
  - Lost to Oleksandr Khyzhniak (Ukraine) RSC2 (bronze)
- 2019 World Championships in Yekaterinburg, Russia (middleweight)
  - Defeated Serhat Güler (Turkey) 4–1
  - Lost to Arman Darchinyan (Armenia) 0–5
- 2020 European Olympic Qualification Tournament in London, England (middleweight)
  - Defeated Ryszard Lewicki (Poland) 5–0
  - Tournament postponed due to COVID-19 pandemic, scheduled to face Miguel Cuadrado

== Personal life ==
Csemez has a tattoo of his inspiration Muhammad Ali on the inner forearm of his left arm, and he is called Slovak Muhammad Ali by other boxers and the Slovak media alike. He also lists Tyson Fury as a role model.
