= Gleb Bakshi =

Russian boxer (born 1995)

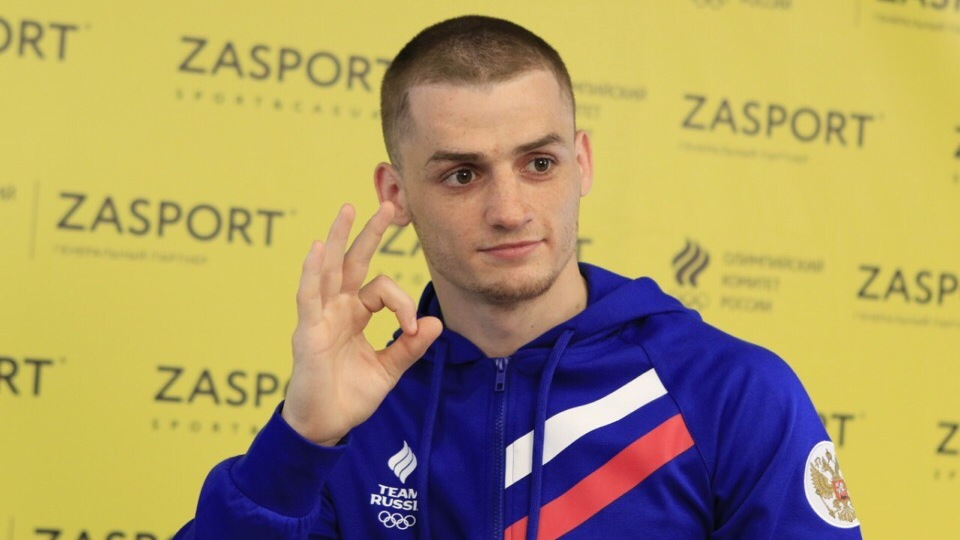
- Bakshi in 2018

Personal information
- Nationality: (Russia) Russian (since 2014) (Ukraine) Ukrainian (until 2014)
- Born: Gleb Sergeyevich Bakshi; 12 November 1995 (age 30) Simferopol, Autonomous Republic of Crimea, Ukraine
- Height: 1.85 m (6 ft 1 in)

Boxing career

Boxing record
- Total fights: 37
- Wins: 28
- Win by KO: 1
- Losses: 9
- Draws: 0
- No contests: 0
Medal record
Men's amateur boxing
Representing (Russia) ROC
Olympic Games
Bronze medal – third place	2020 Tokyo	Middleweight
Representing Russia
World Championships
Gold medal – first place	2019 Yekaterinburg	Middleweight

Gleb Sergeyevich Bakshi (Russian: Глеб Сергеевич Бакши, Ukrainian: Гліб Сергійович Бакши; born 12 November 1995) is a Russian and former Ukrainian boxer of Serbian descent. He is an Honored Master of Sports of Russia.

Bakshi won the gold medal at the 2019 AIBA World Boxing Championships.
