= Oleksandr Khyzhniak =

Ukrainian boxer (born 1995)

Oleksandr Khyzhniak Олександр Хижняк
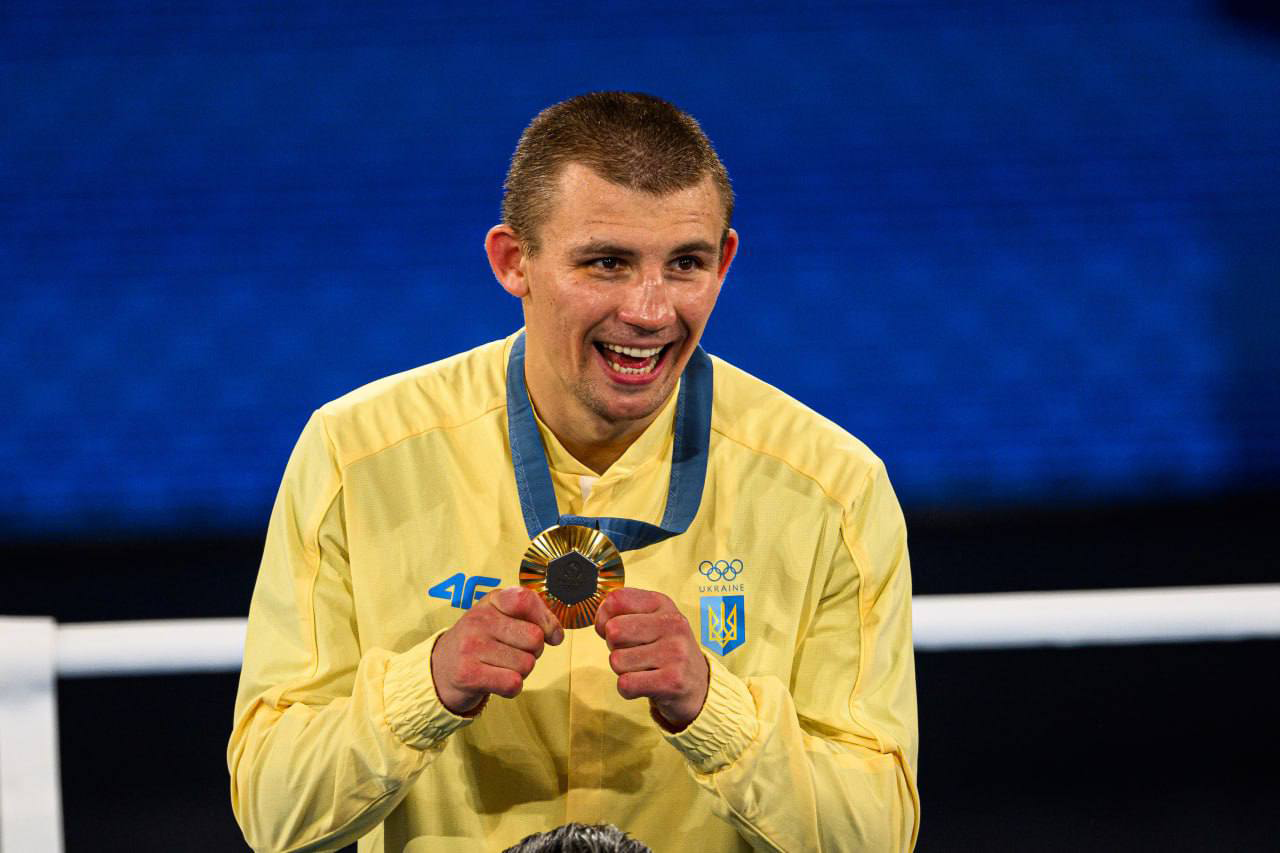
- Khyzhniak in 2024

Personal information
- Born: 3 August 1995 (age 31) Poltava, Ukraine
- Height: 1.81 m (5 ft 11 in)
- Weight: Light heavyweight; Middleweight

Boxing career
- Stance: Orthodox

Boxing record
- Total fights: 3
- Wins: 3
- Win by KO: 2
Medal record
Men's amateur boxing
Representing Ukraine
Olympic Games
Gold medal – first place	2024 Paris	Middleweight
Silver medal – second place	2020 Tokyo	Middleweight
World Championships
Gold medal – first place	2017 Hamburg	Middleweight
European Games
Gold medal – first place	2019 Minsk	Middleweight
Gold medal – first place	2023 Kraków-Małopolska	Light heavyweight
Bronze medal – third place	2015 Baku	Light-heavyweight
European Championships
Gold medal – first place	2017 Kharkiv	Middleweight
Youth World Championships
Gold medal – first place	2012 Yerevan	Middleweight
European Youth Championships
Bronze medal – third place	2013 Rotterdam	Middleweight
European Junior Championships
Silver medal – second place	2011 Keszthely	Middleweight

Oleksandr Oleksandrovych Khyzhniak (Ukrainian: Олександр Олександрович Хижняк; born 3 August 1995) is a Ukrainian professional boxer. As an amateur, he won the gold medal at the 2024 Summer Olympics in middleweight category, having won a silver medal at the delayed 2020 Summer Olympics in the same division. He was also 2017 world amateur middleweight champion. Khyzhniak turned professional in 2026, winning his debut fight by first round knockout. In just his third pro-fight he won the WBA light-heavyweight Gold title.
