= Arman Darchinyan =

Armenian boxer

Personal information
- Nationality: Armenia
- Born: 30 April 1994 (age 30); Vanadzor, Armenia

Sport
- Sport: Boxing

Arman Darchinyan (born 30 April 1994) is an Armenian boxer.

Darchinyan qualified to represent Armenia in the 2020 Tokyo Olympics' boxing middleweight division. He beat Slovakia's Andrej Csemez 5-0 and awaits the quarterfinals on August 1.

== Personal life ==
Darchinyan is married and has a daughter. His uncle Vic Darchinyan was also an Olympic boxer, who represented Armenia in the flyweight category at the 2000 Sydney Olympics.
