= Cycling at the 2019 European Games – Qualification =

A total of 542 athletes will compete in the cycling competitions at the 2019 European Games; 226 in road cycling and 316 in track cycling. Quota places for the road cycling events are based on the UCI World Rankings at 31 December 2018, while the quota places for the track cycling events are based on the UCI ranking after the 2019 UCI Track Cycling World Championships.

== Road cycling ==
=== Men's road race ===
| Means of qualification | Ranking by nation | Athletes per NOC | Qualified |
|---|---|---|---|
| Host country | — | 5 | Belarus |
| UCI World Ranking and UCI European Tour Nation Ranking | 1–10 | 5 | Belgium; Denmark; France; Germany; Great Britain; Italy; Netherlands; Poland; Slovenia; Spain |
| UCI World Ranking and UCI European Tour Nation Ranking | 11–20 | 4 | Austria; Czech Republic; Estonia; Ireland; Luxembourg; Norway; Portugal; Russia; Slovakia; Switzerland |
| UCI World Ranking and UCI European Tour Nation Ranking | 21–30 | 3 | Azerbaijan; Croatia; Finland; Greece; Latvia; Lithuania; Romania; Sweden; Turkey; Ukraine |
| UCI World Ranking and UCI European Tour Nation Ranking | 31–36 | 2 | Albania; Bulgaria; Hungary; Israel; Moldova; Serbia |
| UCI World Ranking and UCI European Tour Nation Ranking | 37–40 | 1 | Cyprus; Georgia; Kosovo; North Macedonia |
| Universality places | 7 NOCs | 1 | Armenia; Bosnia and Herzegovina; Iceland; Malta; Monaco; Montenegro; San Marino |
| Total | | 148 | |

=== Women's road race ===
| Means of qualification | Ranking by nation | Athletes per NOC | Qualified |
|---|---|---|---|
| Host country | — | 5 | Belarus |
| UCI World Ranking | 1–5 | 5 | Belgium; Germany; Italy; Netherlands; Poland |
| UCI World Ranking | 6–10 | 4 | Denmark; France; Great Britain; Spain; Sweden |
| UCI World Ranking | 11–20 | 2 | Austria; Czech Republic; Finland; Lithuania; Luxembourg; Norway; Russia; Slovenia; Switzerland; Ukraine |
| UCI World Ranking | 21–25 | 1 | Cyprus; Greece; Ireland; Iceland; Portugal |
| Universality places | 3 NOCs | 1 | Azerbaijan; Croatia; Serbia |
| Total | | 78 | |

=== Men's time trial ===
| Means of qualification | Ranking by nation | Athletes per NOC | Qualified |
|---|---|---|---|
| Host country | — | 2 | Belarus |
| UCI World Ranking and UCI European Tour Nation Ranking | 1–15 | 2 | Austria; Belgium; Czech Republic; Denmark; France; Germany; Great Britain; Italy; Netherlands; Norway; Poland; Slovakia; Slovenia; Spain; Switzerland |
| UCI World Ranking and UCI European Tour Nation Ranking | 16–30 | 1 | Azerbaijan; Croatia; Estonia; Finland; Greece; Ireland; Latvia; Lithuania; Luxembourg; Portugal; Romania; Russia; Sweden; Turkey; Ukraine |
| Universality places | 3 NOCs | 1 | Albania; Hungary; Moldova |
| Total | | | 50 |

=== Women's time trial ===
| Means of qualification | Ranking by nation | Athletes per NOC | Qualified |
|---|---|---|---|
| Host country | — | 2 | Belarus |
| UCI World Ranking | 1–10 | 2 | Belgium; Denmark; France; Germany; Great Britain; Italy; Netherlands; Poland; Spain; Sweden |
| UCI World Ranking | 11–20 | 1 | Austria; Czech Republic; Finland; Lithuania; Luxembourg; Norway; Russia; Slovenia; Switzerland; Ukraine |
| Universality places | 2 NOCs | 1 | Cyprus; Israel |
| Total | | 34 | |

== Track cycling ==
=== Team sprint ===
Teams must be composed of 3 riders for the men's event and 2 riders for the women's event.

| Event | Ranking by Nation | Qualified NOCs | |
| Event | Ranking by Nation | Men's | Women's |
|---|---|---|---|
| UCI ranking | 1–9 | Netherlands; France; Great Britain; Poland; Germany; Russia; Czech Republic; Spain; Ireland | Germany; Russia; Netherlands; Poland; Great Britain; Lithuania; France; Ukraine; Spain |
| Host country | — | Belarus | Belarus |
| Total | | | |

=== Sprint ===
| Event | Ranking by Nation | Qualified NOCs | |
| Event | Ranking by Nation | Men's | Women's |
|---|---|---|---|
| NOCs qualified for team sprint | | Netherlands; France; Great Britain; Poland; Germany; Russia; Czech Republic; Spain; Ireland | Germany; Russia; Netherlands; Poland; Great Britain; Lithuania; France; Ukraine; Spain |
| UCI ranking | 1–13 | Netherlands; France; Hungary; Lithuania; Russia; Great Britain; Germany; Spain; Czech Republic; Ukraine; Italy; Lithuania; Italy | Russia; Lithuania; Germany; Netherlands; Italy; Ireland; Ukraine; Belgium; Poland; Spain; Italy; Czech Republic; France |
| Host country | — | Belarus | Belarus |
| Total | | | |

=== Keirin ===
| Event | Ranking by Nation | Qualified NOCs | |
| Event | Ranking by Nation | Men's | Women's |
|---|---|---|---|
| NOCs qualified for team sprint | | Netherlands; France; Great Britain; Poland; Germany; Russia; Czech Republic; Spain; Ireland | Germany; Russia; Netherlands; Poland; Great Britain; Lithuania; France; Ukraine; Spain |
| UCI ranking | 1–13 | Netherlands; Czech Republic; Italy; Ukraine; France; Hungary; Germany; Great Britain; Lithuania; Russia; Italy; Lithuania; Azerbaijan | Belgium; Netherlands; Russia; Ireland; Italy; Czech Republic; France; Spain; Lithuania; Great Britain; Italy; Poland; Ukraine |
| Host country | — | Belarus | Belarus |
| Total | | | |

=== 1km/500m time trial ===
| Event | Ranking by Nation | Qualified NOCs | |
| Event | Ranking by Nation | Men's | Women's |
|---|---|---|---|
| NOCs qualified for team sprint | | Netherlands; France; Great Britain; Poland; Germany; Russia; Czech Republic; Spain; Ireland | Germany; Russia; Netherlands; Poland; Great Britain; Lithuania; France; Ukraine; Spain |
| UCI ranking | 1–5 | Netherlands; France; Czech Republic; Italy; Germany | Italy; Russia; Netherlands; Czech Republic; Spain |
| Host country | — | Belarus | Belarus |
| Total | | | |

=== Team pursuit ===
| Event | Ranking by Nation | Qualified NOCs | |
| Event | Ranking by Nation | Men's | Women's |
|---|---|---|---|
| UCI ranking | 1–9 | Great Britain; Denmark; Germany; Italy; Switzerland; Poland; Russia; Belgium; France | Great Britain; Italy; Germany; France; Poland; Belgium; Ireland; Ukraine; Russia |
| Host country | — | Belarus | Belarus |
| Total | | | |

=== Individual pursuit ===
| Event | Ranking by Nation | Qualified NOCs | |
| Event | Ranking by Nation | Men's | Women's |
|---|---|---|---|
| NOCs qualified for team pursuit | | Great Britain; Denmark; Germany; Italy; Switzerland; Poland; Russia; Belgium; France | Great Britain; Italy; Germany; France; Poland; Belgium; Ireland; Ukraine; Russia |
| UCI ranking | 1–5 | Portugal; Switzerland; Italy; Germany; Czech Republic | Great Britain; Germany; Belarus; France; Italy |
| Host country | — | Belarus | Belarus |
| Total | | | |

=== Scratch race ===
| Event | Ranking by Nation | Qualified NOCs | |
| Event | Ranking by Nation | Men's | Women's |
|---|---|---|---|
| NOCs qualified for team pursuit | | Great Britain; Denmark; Germany; Italy; Switzerland; Poland; Russia; Belgium; France | Great Britain; Italy; Germany; France; Poland; Belgium; Ireland; Ukraine; Russia |
| UCI ranking | 1–10 | Greece; Ireland; Austria; Netherlands; Ukraine; Portugal; Hungary; Czech Republic; Slovakia; Spain | Lithuania; Norway; Netherlands; Slovakia; Spain; Czech Republic; Switzerland; Portugal; Austria; Denmark |
| Host country | — | Belarus | Belarus |
| Total | | | |

=== Points race ===
| Event | Ranking by Nation | Qualified NOCs | |
| Event | Ranking by Nation | Men's | Women's |
|---|---|---|---|
| NOCs qualified for team pursuit | | Great Britain; Denmark; Germany; Italy; Switzerland; Poland; Russia; Belgium; France | Great Britain; Italy; Germany; France; Poland; Belgium; Ireland; Ukraine; Russia |
| UCI ranking | 1–10 | Austria; Spain; Ukraine; Greece; Ireland; Netherlands; Portugal; Czech Republic; Hungary; Armenia | Czech Republic; Netherlands; Austria; Norway; Spain; Switzerland; Portugal; Lithuania; Denmark; Slovakia |
| Host country | — | Belarus | Belarus |
| Total | | | |

=== Omnium ===
| Event | Ranking by Nation | Qualified NOCs | |
| Event | Ranking by Nation | Men's | Women's |
|---|---|---|---|
| NOCs qualified for team pursuit | | Great Britain; Denmark; Germany; Italy; Switzerland; Poland; Russia; Belgium; France | Great Britain; Italy; Germany; France; Poland; Belgium; Ireland; Ukraine; Russia |
| UCI ranking | 1–12 | Greece; Spain; Netherlands; Portugal; Hungary; Ireland; Ukraine; Czech Republic; Slovakia; Austria; Armenia; Lithuania | Netherlands; Lithuania; Denmark; Norway; Portugal; Switzerland; Spain; Austria; Slovakia; Czech Republic; Finland; Greece |
| Host country | — | Belarus | Belarus |
| Total | | | |

=== Madison ===
| Event | Ranking by Nation | Qualified NOCs | |
| Event | Ranking by Nation | Men's | Women's |
|---|---|---|---|
| NOCs qualified for team pursuit | | Great Britain; Denmark; Germany; Italy; Switzerland; Poland; Russia; Belgium; France | Great Britain; Italy; Germany; France; Poland; Belgium; Ireland; Ukraine; Russia |
| UCI ranking | 1–4 | Portugal; Spain; Ireland; Austria | Netherlands; Denmark; Switzerland; Czech Republic |
| Host country | — | Belarus | Belarus |
| Total | | | |
