= Karate at the 2019 European Games =

Karate competition

- Venue: Čyžoŭka-Arena
- Dates: 29–30 June
- Competitors: 96 from 37 nations

Karate competitions at the 2019 European Games in Minsk were held on 29 and 30 June 2019 at the Čyžoŭka-Arena. The competition consisted of twelve events, six in each gender – two kata or technique events, and ten weighted kumite or combat events.

== Medal table ==
* Host nation (Belarus)

Rank	Nation	Gold	Silver	Bronze	Total
1	Spain	3	0	0	3
2	Italy	2	1	3	6
3	Ukraine	2	1	2	5
4	Azerbaijan	1	3	1	5
5	Croatia	1	1	0	2
6	Austria	1	0	0	1
6	Bulgaria	1	0	0	1
6	Latvia	1	0	0	1
9	Turkey	0	4	2	6
10	Montenegro	0	1	0	1
10	Slovenia	0	1	0	1
12	Belarus*	0	0	2	2
12	France	0	0	2	2
12	Germany	0	0	2	2
12	Hungary	0	0	2	2
16	Estonia	0	0	1	1
16	Finland	0	0	1	1
16	Georgia	0	0	1	1
16	Greece	0	0	1	1
16	Luxembourg	0	0	1	1
16	Portugal	0	0	1	1
16	Russia	0	0	1	1
16	Switzerland	0	0	1	1
Totals (23 entries)		12	12	24	48

== Medalists ==
=== Men ===
Event	Gold	Silver	Bronze
Individual Kata	Damián Quintero; Spain	Ali Sofuoğlu; Turkey	Roman Heydarov; Azerbaijan Mattia Busato; Italy
Kumite -60 kg	Kalvis Kalniņš; Latvia	Firdovsi Farzaliyev; Azerbaijan	Angelo Crescenzo; Italy Evgeny Plakhutin; Russia
Kumite -67 kg	Luca Maresca; Italy	Mario Hodžić; Montenegro	Artsiom Krautsou; Belarus Yves Martial Tadissi; Hungary
Kumite -75 kg	Stanislav Horuna; Ukraine	Rafael Aghayev; Azerbaijan	Pavel Artamonov; Estonia Gábor Hárspataki; Hungary
Kumite -84 kg	Ivan Kvesić; Croatia	Uğur Aktaş; Turkey	Michele Martina; Italy Valerii Chobotar; Ukraine
Kumite +84 kg	Asiman Gurbanli; Azerbaijan	Anđelo Kvesić; Croatia	Gogita Arkania; Georgia Jonathan Horne; Germany

=== Women ===
Event	Gold	Silver	Bronze
Individual Kata	Sandra Sánchez; Spain	Viviana Bottaro; Italy	Patrícia Esparteiro; Portugal Dilara Bozan; Turkey
Kumite -50 kg	Bettina Plank; Austria	Serap Özçelik; Turkey	Mariya Koulinkovitch; Belarus Sophia Bouderbane; France
Kumite -55 kg	Ivet Goranova; Bulgaria	Anzhelika Terliuga; Ukraine	Jana Bitsch; Germany Jennifer Warling; Luxembourg
Kumite -61 kg	Anita Serogina; Ukraine	Tjaša Ristić; Slovenia	Gwendoline Philippe; France Merve Çoban; Turkey
Kumite -68 kg	Silvia Semeraro; Italy	Irina Zaretska; Azerbaijan	Elena Quirici; Switzerland Halyna Melnyk; Ukraine
Kumite +68 kg	Laura Palacio; Spain	Meltem Hocaoğlu; Turkey	Titta Keinänen; Finland Eleni Chatziliadou; Greece

== Qualification ==
NOC	Men						Women						Total
NOC	-60 kg	-67 kg	-75 kg	-84 kg	+84 kg	Kata	-50 kg	-55 kg	-61 kg	-68 kg	+68 kg	Kata	Total
Andorra						X							1
Austria		X					X						2
Azerbaijan	X	X	X		X	X	X			X			7
Belarus	X	X	X	X	X	X	X	X	X	X	X	X	12
Belgium		X											1
Bulgaria								X					1
Croatia				X	X								2
Czech Republic												X	1
Denmark										X			1
Estonia			X										1
Finland											X		1
France				X		X	X		X	X	X	X	7
Georgia					X								1
Germany			X		X	X	X	X				X	6
Great Britain			X					X					2
Greece											X		1
Hungary		X	X										2
Italy		X		X		X				X	X	X	6
Kosovo	X			X									2
Latvia	X												1
Luxembourg								X					1
Montenegro		X		X									2
Netherlands					X								1
North Macedonia	X												1
Norway									X				1
Poland								X					1
Portugal												X	1
Romania	X												1
Russia	X												1
Serbia					X		X		X				3
Slovakia										X			1
Slovenia									X				1
Spain						X			X		X	X	4
Sweden											X		1
Switzerland										X			1
Turkey	X	X	X	X	X	X	X	X	X		X	X	11
Ukraine			X	X			X	X	X	X			6
37 NOCs	8	8	8	8	8	8	8	8	8	8	8	8	96
