= Karate at the 2019 European Games – Men's kumite 84 kg =

Men's kumite 84 kg at the 2019 European Games
- Venue: Čyžoŭka-Arena
- Date: 29 June
- Competitors: 8 from 8 nations

Medalists
| gold medal | Ivan Kvesić | Croatia |
| silver medal | Uğur Aktaş | Turkey |
| bronze medal | Valerii Chobotar | Ukraine |
| bronze medal | Michele Martina | Italy |

The men's kumite 84 kg competition at the 2019 European Games in Minsk was held on 29 June 2019 at the Čyžoŭka-Arena.

== Schedule ==
All times are local (UTC+3).

| Date | Time | Event |
|---|---|---|
| Saturday, 29 June 2019 | 12:25 | Elimination round |
| Saturday, 29 June 2019 | 16:47 | Semifinals |
| Saturday, 29 June 2019 | 18:33 | Final |

== Results ==
=== Elimination round ===
==== Group A ====
| Rank | Athlete | B | W | D | L | Pts | Score |
|---|---|---|---|---|---|---|---|
| 1 | Uğur Aktaş (TUR) | 3 | 3 | 0 | 0 | 6 | 6–4 |
| 2 | Michele Martina (ITA) | 3 | 1 | 0 | 2 | 2 | 6–8 |
| 3 | Anton Isakau (BLR) | 3 | 1 | 0 | 2 | 2 | 4–4 |
| 4 | Farouk Abdesselem (FRA) | 3 | 1 | 0 | 2 | 2 | 4–4 |

| | Score | |
|---|---|---|
| Uğur Aktaş (TUR) | 3–3 | Michele Martina (ITA) |
| Farouk Abdesselem (FRA) | 0–2 | Anton Isakau (BLR) |
| Farouk Abdesselem (FRA) | 3–0 | Michele Martina (ITA) |
| Uğur Aktaş (TUR) | 1–0 | Anton Isakau (BLR) |
| Anton Isakau (BLR) | 2–3 | Michele Martina (ITA) |
| Uğur Aktaş (TUR) | 2–1 | Farouk Abdesselem (FRA) |

==== Group B ====
| Rank | Athlete | B | W | D | L | Pts | Score |
|---|---|---|---|---|---|---|---|
| 1 | Ivan Kvesić (CRO) | 3 | 3 | 0 | 0 | 6 | 10–0 |
| 2 | Valerii Chobotar (UKR) | 3 | 2 | 0 | 1 | 4 | 5–6 |
| 3 | Alvin Karaqi (KOS) | 3 | 1 | 0 | 2 | 2 | 4–9 |
| 4 | Nikola Malović (MNE) | 3 | 0 | 0 | 3 | 0 | 0–4 |

| | Score | |
|---|---|---|
| Ivan Kvesić (CRO) | 5–0 | Alvin Karaqi (KOS) |
| Valerii Chobotar (UKR) | 1–0 | Nikola Malović (MNE) |
| Valerii Chobotar (UKR) | 4–3 | Alvin Karaqi (KOS) |
| Ivan Kvesić (CRO) | 2–0 | Nikola Malović (MNE) |
| Nikola Malović (MNE) | 0–1 | Alvin Karaqi (KOS) |
| Ivan Kvesić (CRO) | 3–0 | Valerii Chobotar (UKR) |

=== Finals ===
Semifinals
Uğur Aktaş (TUR) | 4
Valerii Chobotar (UKR) | 1
Ivan Kvesić (CRO) | 8
Michele Martina (ITA) | 0

Final
Uğur Aktaş (TUR) | 0
Ivan Kvesić (CRO) | 0
