= Karate at the 2019 European Games – Men's kumite 67 kg =

Men's kumite 67 kg at the 2019 European Games
- Venue: Čyžoŭka-Arena
- Date: 30 June
- Competitors: 8 from 8 nations

Medalists
gold medal	Luca Maresca	Italy
silver medal	Mario Hodžić	Montenegro
bronze medal	Artsiom Krautsou	Belarus
bronze medal	Yves Martial Tadissi	Hungary

The men's kumite 67 kg competition at the 2019 European Games in Minsk was held on 30 June 2019 at the Čyžoŭka-Arena.

== Schedule ==
All times are local (UTC+3).

Date	Time	Event
Sunday, 30 June 2019	12:00	Elimination round
Sunday, 30 June 2019	16:04	Semifinals
Sunday, 30 June 2019	17:40	Final

== Results ==
=== Elimination round ===
==== Group A ====
Rank	Athlete	B	W	D	L	Pts	Score
1	Artsiom Krautsou (BLR)	3	1	2	0	4	5–1
2	Yves Martial Tadissi (HUN)	3	1	2	0	4	5–1
3	Stefan Pokorny (AUT)	3	1	2	0	4	4–3
4	Rafiz Hasanov (AZE)	3	0	0	3	0	5–14

	Score	
Artsiom Krautsou (BLR)	0–0	Stefan Pokorny (AUT)
Yves Martial Tadissi (HUN)	5–1	Rafiz Hasanov (AZE)
Yves Martial Tadissi (HUN)	0–0	Stefan Pokorny (AUT)
Artsiom Krautsou (BLR)	5–1	Rafiz Hasanov (AZE)
Rafiz Hasanov (AZE)	3–4	Stefan Pokorny (AUT)
Artsiom Krautsou (BLR)	0–0	Yves Martial Tadissi (HUN)

==== Group B ====
Rank	Athlete	B	W	D	L	Pts	Score
1	Luca Maresca (ITA)	3	1	2	0	4	3–0
2	Mario Hodžić (MNE)	3	1	2	0	4	3–2
3	Burak Uygur (TUR)	3	0	3	0	3	0–0
4	Jess Rosiello (BEL)	3	0	1	2	1	2–6

	Score	
Luca Maresca (ITA)	0–0	Mario Hodžić (MNE)
Jess Rosiello (BEL)	0–0	Burak Uygur (TUR)
Jess Rosiello (BEL)	2–3	Mario Hodžić (MNE)
Luca Maresca (ITA)	0–0	Burak Uygur (TUR)
Burak Uygur (TUR)	0–0	Mario Hodžić (MNE)
Luca Maresca (ITA)	3–0	Jess Rosiello (BEL)

=== Finals ===
Semifinals
Artsiom Krautsou (BLR)	0
Mario Hodžić (MNE)	4
Luca Maresca (ITA)	2
Yves Martial Tadissi (HUN)	0

Final
Mario Hodžić (MNE)	3
Luca Maresca (ITA)	4
