= Khariton Agrba =

Russian boxer

Khariton Agrba Харитон Агрба
Personal information
- Nationality: Russian
- Born: 22 October 1995 (age 31) Gagra, Republic of Abkhazia / Georgia
- Height: 5 ft 9 1/2 in (177 cm)
- Weight: Light-welterweight; Welterweight

Boxing career
- Reach: 69 in (175 cm)
- Stance: Southpaw

Boxing record
- Total fights: 19
- Wins: 18
- Win by KO: 9
- Losses: 1
Medal record
Men's amateur boxing
Representing Russia
European Games
Silver medal – second place	2019 Minsk	Welterweight
Strandzha Cup
Gold medal – first place	2018 Sofia	Welterweight
World University Championships
Gold medal – first place	2016 Chiang Mai	Welterweight

Khariton Daurovich Agrba (Russian: Харитон Даурович Агрба) is a Russian professional boxer who has held the WBA Continental super-lightweight title since June. As an amateur he won a silver medal at the 2019 European Games.

== Amateur career ==
During an amateur career in which he compiled a record of 305–16, Agrba was a two-time runner up at the Russian National Championships; won gold medals at the 2016 World University Championships and 2018 Strandzha Cup; and silver medals at the 2019 European Games and 2019 Boxing World Cup.

== Professional career ==
Agrba made his professional debut on 13 December 2019, scoring a six-round unanimous decision (UD) victory over Shokhrukh Abdiev at Manezh in Vladikavkaz, Russia.

He won his first professional title in his next fight, the WBA Fedecaribe welterweight title, after defeating Flavio Cesar Ramos via third-round stoppage by corner retirement (RTD) on 7 February 2020 at the Roberto Durán Arena in Panama City. He moved down in weight for his next fight, facing Manuk Dilanyan for the vacant WBA Continental super-lightweight title on 15 June 2020 at the Soviet Wings Sport Palace in Moscow. Agrba captured his second WBA regional title in a shutout UD victory, with all three judges scoring the bout 100–90.

== Professional boxing record ==
19 fights	18 wins	1 loss
By knockout	9	1
By decision	9	0

No.	Result	Record	Opponent	Type	Round, time	Date	Location	Notes
19	Win	18–1	Zaur Abdullaev	SD	12	10 Oct 2026	RCC Boxing Academy, Ekaterinburg, Russia	Won vacant WBA interim light welterweight title
18	Win	17–1	Ruben Nestor Neri Munoz	UD	12	12 Dec 2025	Duty Free Tennis Stadium, Dubai, UAE	
17	Win	16–1	Charles Shinima	UD	10	6 Oct 2025	KSK Arena, Saint Petersburg, Russia	
16	Loss	15–1	Ruben Nestor Neri Munoz	KO	2 (12), 1:59	5 Jul 2025	DIVS, Ekaterinburg, Russia	
15	Win	15–0	Jose Angel Gabriel Rosa	UD	10	4 Nov 2024	Vysotsky Sport Palace, Samara, Russia	
14	Win	14–0	Claudio Gabriel Daneff	UD	10	6 Sep 2024	Traktor Sport Palace, Chelyabinsk, Russia	Won vacant IBF Inter-Continental light welterweight title
13	Win	13–0	Vage Sarukhanyan	RTD	8 (10), 3:00	10 Feb 2024	KRK Uralets, Ekaterinburg, Russia	
12	Win	12–0	Alexander Duran	RTD	9 (10), 3:00	8 Sep 2023	Traktor Sport Palace, Chelyabinsk, Russia	
11	Win	11–0	Prince Dlomo	KO	6 (10), 0:39	7 Mar 2023	DIVS, Ekaterinburg, Russia	
10	Win	10–0	Julius Indongo	KO	3 (8), 1:50	19 Nov 2022	RCC Boxing Academy, Ekaterinburg, Russia	
9	Win	9–0	Avak Uzlyan	UD	10	31 May 2022	USC Soviet Wins, Moscow, Russia	Won vacant EBP light-welterweight title
8	Win	8–0	Brayam Rico	TKO	3 (10), 1:04	22 Feb 2022	USC Soviet Wings, Moscow, Russia	
7	Win	7–0	Petr Petrov	TKO	3 (10), 2:50	24 Dec 2021	USC Soviet Wings, Moscow, Russia	Won vacant IBF light-welterweight title
6	Win	6–0	Andrey Malik	RTD	5 (10), 3:00	10 Oct 2021	Ice Palace Salavat Yulaev, Ufa, Russia	
5	Win	5–0	Helber Rojas	TKO	2 (10), 2:30	20 Mar 2021	Megasport Sport Palace, Moscow, Russia	
4	Win	4–0	Soslan Tedeev	UD	10	22 Aug 2020	Pyramide, Kazan, Russia	
3	Win	3–0	Manuk Dilanyan	UD	10	15 Jun 2020	USC Soviet Wings, Moscow, Russia	Won vacant WBA Continental light-welterweight title
2	Win	2–0	Flavio Cesar Ramos	RTD	3 (8), 3:00	7 Feb 2020	Roberto Durán Arena, Panama City, Panama	Won WBA Fedecaribe welterweight title
1	Win	1–0	Shokhrukh Abdiev	UD	6	13 Dec 2019	Manezh, Vladikavkaz, Russia	

Sporting positions
Regional boxing titles
Preceded by Flavio Cesar Ramos	WBA Fedecaribe welterweight champion 7 February 2020 – May 2020; Vacated	Vacant
Vacant Title last held by Robbie Davies Jr.	WBA Continental super-lightweight champion 15 June 2020 – present	Incumbent
