= Judo at the 2019 European Games – Men's 81 kg =

Judo competition

Judo Men's 81 kg at the 2019 European Games
- Venue: Čyžoŭka-Arena
- Location: Minsk, Belarus
- Date: 23 June
- Competitors: 38 from 26 nations

Medalists
gold medal	Matthias Casse (1st title)	Belgium
silver medal	Ivaylo Ivanov	Bulgaria
bronze medal	Luka Maisuradze	Georgia
bronze medal	Attila Ungvári	Hungary

Competition at external databases
- Links: IJF • JudoInside

The men's 81 kg judo event at the 2019 European Games in Minsk was held on 23 June at the Čyžoŭka-Arena.

== Results ==
=== Finals ===
Semifinals
Attila Ungvári (HUN)	00
Ivaylo Ivanov (BUL)	01
Matthias Casse (BEL)	10
Luka Maisuradze (GEO)	00

Final
Ivaylo Ivanov (BUL)	00
Matthias Casse (BEL)	01

=== Repechage ===
Repechage
Frank de Wit (NED)	00
Antonio Esposito (ITA)	01

Third place
Antonio Esposito (ITA)	00
Luka Maisuradze (GEO)	10

Repechage
Alexander Wieczerzak (GER)	11
Stuart McWatt (GBR)	01

Third place
Alexander Wieczerzak (GER)	00
Attila Ungvári (HUN)	01

=== Pool A ===
Round of 64
Vlad Vişan (ROU)	00
José Mendiola (ESP)	10

Round of 32
Frank de Wit (NED)	01
Timo Cavelius (GER)	00
Muhammed Koç (TUR)	00
Damian Stępień (POL)	10
Sami Chouchi (BEL)	10
José Mendiola (ESP)	00
Attila Ungvári (HUN)	10
Victor Busch (SWE)	00

Round of 16
Frank de Wit (NED)	10
Damian Stępień (POL)	00
Sami Chouchi (BEL)	00
Attila Ungvári (HUN)	01

Quarterfinals
Frank de Wit (NED)	00
Attila Ungvári (HUN)	10

=== Pool B ===
Round of 64
Antonio Esposito (ITA)	10
Carlos Luz (POR)	00
Shamil Borchashvili (AUT)	10
Srđan Mrvaljević (MNE)	00

Round of 32
Alan Khubetsov (RUS)	00
Antonio Esposito (ITA)	01
Alexios Ntanatsidis (GRE)	01
Kristjan Tõniste (EST)	00
Ivaylo Ivanov (BUL)	11
Sveinbjörn Iura (ISL)	00
Shamil Borchashvili (AUT)	10
Ivan Petr (CZE)	00

Round of 16
Antonio Esposito (ITA)	10
Alexios Ntanatsidis (GRE)	00
Ivaylo Ivanov (BUL)	11
Shamil Borchashvili (AUT)	00

Quarterfinals
Antonio Esposito (ITA)	00
Ivaylo Ivanov (BUL)	10

=== Pool C ===
Round of 64
Dominik Družeta (CRO)	01
Christian Parlati (ITA)	10

Round of 32
Matthias Casse (BEL)	10
Christian Parlati (ITA)	01
Jaromír Musil (CZE)	00
Robin Pacek (SWE)	11
Alexander Wieczerzak (GER)	10
Filip Štancel (SVK)	00
Alfonso Urquiza (ESP)	00
Nebojša Gardašević (MNE)	10

Round of 16
Matthias Casse (BEL)	01
Robin Pacek (SWE)	00
Alexander Wieczerzak (GER)	10
Nebojša Gardašević (MNE)	00

Quarterfinals
Matthias Casse (BEL)	01
Alexander Wieczerzak (GER)	00

=== Pool D ===
Round of 64
Nicon Zaboroșciuc (MDA)	00
Róbert Rajkai (HUN)	01
Damian Szwarnowiecki (POL)	10
Aristos Michael (CYP)	00

Round of 32
Vedat Albayrak (TUR)	11
Róbert Rajkai (HUN)	01
Marcel Cercea (ROU)	00
Stuart McWatt (GBR)	11
Anri Egutidze (POR)	11
Damian Szwarnowiecki (POL)	00
Alpha Djalo (FRA)	00
Luka Maisuradze (GEO)	10

Round of 16
Vedat Albayrak (TUR)	00
Stuart McWatt (GBR)	10
Anri Egutidze (POR)	00
Luka Maisuradze (GEO)	10

Quarterfinals
Stuart McWatt (GBR)	00
Luka Maisuradze (GEO)	10
