= Montenegro at the 2019 European Games =

- IOC code: MNE
- NOC: Montenegrin Olympic Committee
- Website: www.cok.me

in Minsk, Belarus 21–30 June
- Competitors: 10 in 5 sports
- Medals Ranked 39th: Gold 0 Silver 1 Bronze 0 Total 1

European Games appearances (overview)
- 2015; 2019; 2023; 2027

Montenegro competed at the 2019 European Games in Minsk from 21 to 30 June 2019. Montenegro is represented by 11 athletes in 5 sports.

== Competitors ==
Sport	Men	Women	Total
Archery	0	1	1
Boxing	1	0	1
Judo	4	0	4
Karate	2	0	2
Shooting	1	1	2
Total	8	2	10

== Medalists ==
Medal	Name	Sport	Event	Date
Silver	Mario Hodžić	Karate	Men's kumite 67 kg	30 June

== Archery ==
Recurve

Athlete	Event	Ranking round		Round of 64	Round of 32	Round of 16	Quarterfinals	Semifinals	Final / BM	
Athlete	Event	Score	Seed	Opposition Score	Opposition Score	Opposition Score	Opposition Score	Opposition Score	Opposition Score	Rank
Mina Šibalić	Women's individual	570	45	Jager (DEN); L 4–6	Did not advance					

== Boxing ==
Men

Athlete	Event	Round of 32	Round of 16	Quarterfinals	Semifinals	Final	
Athlete	Event	Opposition Result	Opposition Result	Opposition Result	Opposition Result	Opposition Result	Rank
Stefan Savković	69 kg	Messaoudi (BEL); L 0–5	did not advance				

== Judo ==
Men

Athlete	Event	Round of 64	Round of 32	Round of 16	Quarterfinals	Semifinals	Repechage	Final / BM	
Athlete	Event	Opposition Result	Opposition Result	Opposition Result	Opposition Result	Opposition Result	Opposition Result	Opposition Result	Rank
Nikola Gardašević	–73 kg	Bye	Raicu (ROU); W 10–0	Iartcev (RUS); L 0s1–1s1	Did not advance				
Nebojša Gardašević	–81 kg	Bye	Urquiza (ESP); W 10s2–0	Wieczerzak (GER); L 0s1–10	Did not advance				
Srđan Mrvaljević	–81 kg	Borchashvili (AUT); L 0s2–10s1	Did not advance						
Danilo Pantić	–100 kg	Bye	Fara (AUT); W 10s1–0	Frey (GER); W 10s2–0s1	Liparteliani (GEO); L 0–11	Did not advance	Gasimov (AZE); L 0s1–1s1	Did not advance	

== Karate ==
Men

Athletes	Event	Group stage				Semifinals	Final	Rank
Athletes	Event	Opposition Score	Opposition Score	Opposition Score	Rank	Opposition Score	Opposition Score	Rank
Mario Hodžić	67 kg	Maresca (ITA); D 0–0	Rosiello (BEL); W 4–0	Uyğur (TUR); D 0–0	2 Q	Krautsou (BLR); W 4–0	Maresca (ITA); L 3–4	2nd place, silver medalist(s)
Nikola Malović	84 kg	Chobotar (UKR); L 0–1	Kvesić (CRO); L 0–2	Karaqi (KOS); L 0–1	4	Did not advance		

== Shooting ==
Men

Athlete	Event	Qualification		Final	
Athlete	Event	Points	Rank	Points	Rank
Nemanja Obradović	10 m air rifle	611.8	40	Did not advance	

Women

Athlete	Event	Qualification		Final	
Athlete	Event	Points	Rank	Points	Rank
Jelena Pantović	10 m air pistol	550	34	Did not advance	
