= Cycling at the 2019 European Games – Women's omnium =

Women's omnium at the 2019 European Games
- Venue: Minsk Velodrome
- Date: 29 June
- Competitors: 17 from 17 nations
- Winning points: 150

Medalists
gold medal	Kirsten Wild	Netherlands
silver medal	Evgenia Augustinas	Russia
bronze medal	Elisa Balsamo	Italy

The women's omnium competition at the 2019 European Games was held at the Minsk Velodrome on 29 June 2019.

== Results ==
=== Scratch race ===
Rank	Name	Nation	Laps down	Event points
1	Kirsten Wild	Netherlands		40
2	Jessica Roberts	Great Britain		38
3	Elisa Balsamo	Italy		36
4	Shannon McCurley	Ireland		34
5	Maria Martins	Portugal		32
6	Aline Seitz	Switzerland		30
7	Evgenia Augustinas	Russia		28
8	Olivija Baleišytė	Lithuania		26
9	Alžbeta Bačíková	Slovakia		24
10	Tatsiana Sharakova	Belarus		22
11	Katarzyna Pawłowska	Poland		20
12	Anita Stenberg	Norway		18
13	Irene Usabiaga	Spain		16
14	Yuliia Biriukova	Ukraine		14
15	Jarmila Machačová	Czech Republic		12
16	Verena Eberhardt	Austria		10
17	Gilke Croket	Belgium		8

=== Tempo race ===
Rank	Name	Nation	Points in race	Event points
1	Kirsten Wild	Netherlands	25	40
2	Elisa Balsamo	Italy	22	38
3	Jessica Roberts	Great Britain	21	36
4	Evgenia Augustinas	Russia	21	34
5	Tatsiana Sharakova	Belarus	20	32
6	Anita Stenberg	Norway	20	30
7	Aline Seitz	Switzerland	20	28
8	Shannon McCurley	Ireland	20	26
9	Maria Martins	Portugal	7	24
10	Yuliia Biriukova	Ukraine	5	22
11	Verena Eberhardt	Austria	2	20
12	Katarzyna Pawłowska	Poland	1	18
13	Jarmila Machačová	Czech Republic	1	16
14	Olivija Baleišytė	Lithuania	0	14
15	Irene Usabiaga	Spain	0	12
16	Alžbeta Bačíková	Slovakia	0	10
17	Gilke Croket	Belgium	0	8

=== Elimination race ===
Rank	Name	Nation	Event points
1	Kirsten Wild	Netherlands	40
2	Elisa Balsamo	Italy	38
3	Jessica Roberts	Great Britain	36
4	Maria Martins	Portugal	34
5	Evgenia Augustinas	Russia	32
6	Alžbeta Bačíková	Slovakia	30
7	Anita Stenberg	Norway	28
8	Aline Seitz	Switzerland	26
9	Irene Usabiaga	Spain	24
10	Olivija Baleišytė	Lithuania	22
11	Shannon McCurley	Ireland	20
12	Tatsiana Sharakova	Belarus	18
13	Jarmila Machačová	Czech Republic	16
14	Yuliia Biriukova	Ukraine	14
15	Gilke Croket	Belgium	12
16	Katarzyna Pawłowska	Poland	10
17	Verena Eberhardt	Austria	8

=== Points race ===
Rank	Name	Nation	Lap points	Sprint points	Total points	Finish order
1	Tatsiana Sharakova	Belarus	20	25	45	1
2	Verena Eberhardt	Austria	20	16	36	2
3	Kirsten Wild	Netherlands	20	10	30	15
4	Evgenia Augustinas	Russia	20	9	29	14
5	Yuliia Biriukova	Ukraine	20	7	27	6
6	Jarmila Machačová	Czech Republic	20	3	23	12
7	Jessica Roberts	Great Britain	0	9	9	3
8	Elisa Balsamo	Italy	0	8	8	7
9	Aline Seitz	Switzerland	0	7	7	4
10	Anita Stenberg	Norway	0	2	2	8
11	Shannon McCurley	Ireland	0	2	2	10
12	Maria Martins	Portugal	0	1	1	5
13	Gilke Croket	Belgium	0	0	0	9
14	Irene Usabiaga	Spain	0	0	0	11
15	Olivija Baleišytė	Lithuania	0	0	0	13
16	Alžbeta Bačíková	Slovakia	–20	0	–20	16

=== Final ranking ===
The final ranking is given by the sum of the points obtained in the 4 specialties.

Overall rank	Name	Nation	Scratch race	Tempo race	Elimin. race	Points race	Total points
1st place, gold medalist(s)	Kirsten Wild	Netherlands	40	40	40	30	150
2nd place, silver medalist(s)	Evgenia Augustinas	Russia	28	34	32	29	123
3rd place, bronze medalist(s)	Elisa Balsamo	Italy	36	38	38	8	120
4	Jessica Roberts	Great Britain	38	36	36	9	119
5	Tatsiana Sharakova	Belarus	22	32	18	45	117
6	Aline Seitz	Switzerland	30	28	26	7	91
7	Maria Martins	Portugal	32	24	34	1	91
8	Shannon McCurley	Ireland	34	26	20	2	82
9	Anita Stenberg	Norway	18	30	28	2	78
10	Yuliia Biriukova	Ukraine	14	22	14	27	77
11	Verena Eberhardt	Austria	10	20	8	36	74
12	Jarmila Machačová	Czech Republic	12	16	16	23	67
13	Olivija Baleišytė	Lithuania	26	14	22	0	62
14	Irene Usabiaga	Spain	16	12	24	0	52
15	Alžbeta Bačíková	Slovakia	24	10	30	–20	44
16	Gilke Croket	Belgium	8	8	12	0	28
	Katarzyna Pawłowska	Poland	20	18	10	DNS	
