= Necat Ekinci =

Turkish boxer (born 1999)

Personal information
- Nationality: Turkish
- Born: 20 October 1999 (age 26) Edirne, Turkey
- Weight: 69 kg (152 lb)

Boxing career

Necat Ekinci (born 20 October 1999) is a Turkish boxer in the welterweight (69 kg) discipline. He received a quota for the 2020 Summer Olympics. He is a member of Fenerbahçe Boxing.

Ekinci won the bronze medal in the Light weight (60 kg) event at the 2016 Youth World Championships in Saint Petersburg, Russia. In 2019, he competed in the welterweight (69 kg) event at the European Games in Minsk, Belarus, and the World Championships in Yekaterinburg, Russia.
