= Kosovo at the 2019 European Games =

- IOC code: KOS
- NOC: Olympic Committee of Kosovo
- Website: www.noc-kosovo.org

in Minsk, Belarus 21–30 June
- Competitors: 12 in 5 sports
- Flag bearer: Donjeta Sadiku
- Medals Ranked 34th: Gold 1 Silver 1 Bronze 1 Total 3

European Games appearances (overview)
- 2015; 2019; 2023; 2027

Kosovo participated at the 2019 European Games in Minsk, Belarus, held between 21 and 30 June 2019. The country's participation in Minsk marked its second appearance at the European Games since its debut in the inaugural 2015 European Games.

The Kosovo team consisted of 12 athletes competing across five sports. Boxer Donjeta Sadiku was the country's flag-bearer during the opening ceremony. The country was ranked 34th in the overall medal table with three medals including a gold, a silver and a bronze.

== Background ==
The Olympic Committee of Kosovo was formed in 1992 and officially established in 2003. It was officially recognized by the International Olympic Committee on 9 December 2014. The nation made its European Games debut at the first 2015 European Games held in Baku, Azerbaijan. This edition of the Games marked the nation's second appearance at the European Games.

The 2019 European Games were held in Minsk, Belarus between 21 and 30 June 2019. About 3,500 athletes from 50 countries competed in 200 medal events across 15 sports in the Games. Boxer Donjeta Sadiku was the country's flag-bearer during the opening ceremony. Kosovo won a bronze medal in the 2015 Games.

== Medalists ==
Kosovo won three medals, one of each colour, all in the sport of Judo.

Medalists
Medal	Name	Sport	Event	Date
Gold	Majlinda Kelmendi	Judo	Women's -52kg	22 June
Silver	Nora Gjakova	Judo	Women's -57kg	22 June
Bronze	Loriana Kuka	Judo	Women's -78kg	24 June

== Competitors ==
Kosovo was represented by 12 athletes in five sports in the competition.

Sport	Men	Women	Total
Archery	0	1	1
Boxing	3	1	4
Judo	1	4	5
Karate	1	0	1
Table tennis	1	0	1
Total	6	6	12

== Archery ==
Kosovo received a universality place and sent a lone athlete Ardita Zejnullahu for the women's individual event in recurve archery. The women's individual competition was held from 21 to 26 June 2019 at the Olympic Sports Complex in Minsk. Zejnullahu was seeded 48th after finishing with 500 points from a possible 600 in the ranking round. In the round of 64, he lost to Bryony Pitman of Great Britain and bowed out of the competition.

Women

Athlete	Event	Ranking round		Round of 64	Round of 32	Round of 16	Quarterfinals	Semifinals	Final / BM	
Athlete	Event	Score	Seed	Opposition Score	Opposition Score	Opposition Score	Opposition Score	Opposition Score	Opposition Score	Rank
Ardita Zejnullahu	Individual recurve	500	48	Pitman (GBR)	Did not advance					50

== Boxing ==
The European Boxing Confederation allowed each National Olympic Committee (NOC) to nominate one entry per weight category for the men's event. Kosovo sent four athletes including one woman for the boxing event.

Boxing matches were contested between 21 and 30 June 2019 at the Uruchie Sports Palace. In the 64 kg event, Shpetim Bajoku lost to Ahmad Shtiwi of Israel in the first round. In the 69 kg event, Patriot Berhami won his first two rounds before he lost to Lorenzo Sotomayor of Azerbaijan in the quarterfinals. Ardit Delijaj and Donjeta Sadiku lost their first round bouts in the men's 81 kg and women's 60 kg categories respectively.

Men

Athlete	Event	Round of 64	Round of 32	Round of 16	Quarterfinals	Semifinals	Final	
Athlete	Event	Opposition Result	Opposition Result	Opposition Result	Opposition Result	Opposition Result	Opposition Result	Rank
Shpetim Bajoku	64 kg	—	Shtiwi (ISR); L 1–4	Did not advance				
Patriot Behrami	69 kg	Bye	Zeljko (CRO); W 4–0	Mangiacapre (ITA); W 3–2	Sotomayor (AZE); L 0-5	Did not advance		
Ardit Delijaj	81 kg	—	Nersisyan (ARM); RSC Injury	Did not advance				

Women

Athlete	Event	Round of 16	Quarterfinals	Semifinals	Final	
Athlete	Event	Opposition Result	Opposition Result	Opposition Result	Opposition Result	Rank
Donjeta Sadiku	60 kg	Frostholm (DEN); L 0–5	Did not advance			

== Judo ==
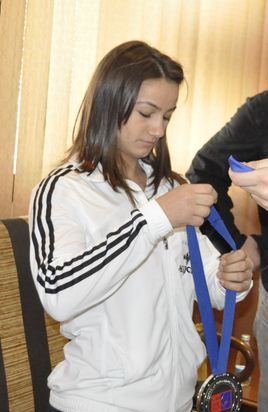
Majlinda Kelmendi won the country's first gold medal at the European Games

Kosovo qualified five judokas for the European Games, which were held at the Čyžoŭka-Arena. In the men's 73 kg, Akil Gjakova won the first round before losing to Georgios Azoidis of Greece in the second round. In the women's events, Majlinda Kelmendi won the gold medal in the 52 kg event after she beat Natalia Kuziutina of Russia in the finals. While in the 57 kg category, Nora Gjakova settled for a silver medal after she lost to Daria Mezhetskaia of Russia in the finals. In the 78 kg weight class, Loriana Kuka lost to Guusje Steenhuis of Netherlands in the semi-finals before winning two matches in the repechage rounds to win the bronze medal.

Men

Athlete	Event	Round of 64	Round of 32	Round of 16	Quarterfinals	Semifinals	Repechage	Final / BM	
Athlete	Event	Opposition Result	Opposition Result	Opposition Result	Opposition Result	Opposition Result	Opposition Result	Opposition Result	Rank
Akil Gjakova	−73 kg	Bye	Shoka (BLR); W 10s1-0h	Azoidis (GRE); L 0-11	Did not advance				

Women

Athlete	Event	Round of 32	Round of 16	Quarterfinals	Semifinals	Repechage	Final / BM	
Athlete	Event	Opposition Result	Opposition Result	Opposition Result	Opposition Result	Opposition Result	Opposition Result	Rank
Distria Krasniqi	−48 kg	Bye	Martínez (ESP) w/o	Did not advance				
Majlinda Kelmendi	−52 kg	Bye	Kocher (SUI); W 10s1–0s	Pienkowska (POL); W 10–0s2	Buchard (FRA); W 0s2-1	Bye	Kuziutina (RUS); W 1s1-0s2	1st place, gold medalist(s)
Nora Gjakova	−57 kg	Bye	Gneto (FRA); W 1-0s1	Strake (GER); W 10–0	Monteiro (POR); W 10–0h	Bye	Mezhetskaia (RUS); L 0s1-1s1	2nd place, silver medalist(s)
Loriana Kuka	−78 kg	Bye	Yeats-Brown (GBR); W 1-0s2	Steenhuis (NED); L 0-11	Did not advance	Wagner (GER); W 1 - 0s2	Malzahn (GER); W 10s1 - 1s1	3rd place, bronze medalist(s)

== Karate ==
The Karate competition was held on 29 June 2019 at the Čyžoŭka-Arena. Alvin Karaqi was the lone participant in the men's Kumite -84kg competition. He won a single game, and lost two in the group stages to bow out of the competition.

Men

Athlete	Event	Group stage			Semifinal	Final / BM	
Athlete	Event	Opposition Score	Opposition Score	Opposition Score	Opposition Score	Opposition Score	Rank
Alvin Karaqi	Men's Kumite -84kg	Kvesić (CRO); L 0–5	Chobotar (UKR); L 3–4	Malović (MNE); W 1–0	Did not advance		

== Table tennis ==
Table Tennis took place from 22 to 29 June 2019 at Tennis Olympic Centre. Kosovo was allocated a universality place in the men's singles event. Fatih Karabaxhk lost his first round match to exit the competition.

Men

Athlete	Event	Round 1	Round 2	Round 3	Round 4	Quarterfinals	Semifinals	Final / BM	
Athlete	Event	Opposition Result	Opposition Result	Opposition Result	Opposition Result	Opposition Result	Opposition Result	Opposition Result	Rank
Fatih Karabaxhak	Men's singles	Oostwouder (NED); L 0–4	Did not advance						

== See also ==
- Sport in Kosovo
