= Boxing at the 2019 European Games – Men's 69 kg =

Boxing competitions

Men's welterweight boxing at the 2019 European Games
- Venue: Uruchie Sports Palace
- Date: 21–29 June
- Competitors: 33 from 33 nations

Medalists
| gold medal | Pat McCormack | Great Britain |
| silver medal | Khariton Agrba | Russia |
| bronze medal | Lorenzo Sotomayor | Azerbaijan |
| bronze medal | Yevhenii Barabanov | Ukraine |

The men's welterweight 69 kg boxing event at the 2019 European Games in Minsk was held from 21 to 29 June at the Uruchie Sports Palace.

== Results ==
=== Final ===
| Final; 29 June |
| Pat McCormack (GBR) | 5 |
| Khariton Agrba (RUS) | 0 |

=== Top half ===
| Round of 64; 21 June |
| Marian Pița (ROU) | 2 |
| László Kozák (HUN) | 3 |

Round of 32; 22 June
Pat McCormack (GBR) | 5
László Kozák (HUN) | 0
Pavel Kamanin (EST) | 3
Petar Draganov (BUL) | 2
Tomáš Zold (SVK) | 0
Hugo Micallef (MON) | 5
Nabil Messaoudi (BEL) | 5
Stefan Savković (MNE) | 0
Lorenzo Sotomayor (AZE) | 5
Gurgen Madoyan (ARM) | 0
Magomed Schachidov (GER) | 2
Adem Fetahović (BIH) | 3
Patriot Behrami (KOS) | 4
Marko Zeljko (CRO) | 0
Marcel Rumpler (AUT) | 2
Vincenzo Mangiacapre (ITA) | 3

Round of 16; 24 June
Pat McCormack (GBR) | 5
Pavel Kamanin (EST) | 0
Hugo Micallef (MON) | 3
Nabil Messaoudi (BEL) | 2
Lorenzo Sotomayor (AZE) | 4
Adem Fetahović (BIH) | 1
Patriot Behrami (KOS) | 3
Vincenzo Mangiacapre (ITA) | 2

Quarterfinals; 26 June
Pat McCormack (GBR) | 5
Hugo Micallef (MON) | 0
Lorenzo Sotomayor (AZE) | 5
Patriot Behrami (KOS) | 0

Semifinals; 28 June
Pat McCormack (GBR) | RSC
Lorenzo Sotomayor (AZE)

=== Bottom half ===
Round of 32; 22 June
Vasile Belous (MDA) | 5
Filip Wąchała (POL) | 0
Rayan Yahia Berrouiguet (FRA) | 1
Alban Beqiri (ALB) | 4
Khariton Agrba (RUS) | 5
Genadijs Merkulovs (LAT) | 0
Eskerkhan Madiev (GEO) | 4
Hadi Srour (NOR) | 1
Yauheni Dauhaliavets (BLR) | RSC
Miroslav Kapuler (ISR)
Kieran Molloy (IRL) | 5
Goce Janevski (MKD) | 0
Damjan Grmuša (SRB) | 0
Necat Ekinci (TUR) | 5
Jonathan Brunschweiler (SUI)
Yevhenii Barabanov (UKR) | ABD

Round of 16; 24 June
Vasile Belous (MDA) | 3
Alban Beqiri (ALB) | 2
Khariton Agrba (RUS) | 5
Eskerkhan Madiev (GEO) | 0
Yauheni Dauhaliavets (BLR) | 4
Kieran Molloy (IRL) | 1
Necat Ekinci (TUR) | 0
Yevhenii Barabanov (UKR) | 5

Quarterfinals; 26 June
Vasile Belous (MDA) | 0
Khariton Agrba (RUS) | 5
Yauheni Dauhaliavets (BLR) | 1
Yevhenii Barabanov (UKR) | 4

Semifinals; 28 June
Khariton Agrba (RUS) | 5
Yevhenii Barabanov (UKR) | 0
