= Austria at the 2019 European Games =

- IOC code: AUT
- NOC: Austrian Olympic Committee
- Website: www.olympia.at

in Minsk, Belarus 21 – 30 June 2019
- Competitors: 58 in 11 sports
- Medals Ranked 31st: Gold 1 Silver 2 Bronze 4 Total 7

European Games appearances (overview)
- 2015; 2019; 2023; 2027

Austria competed at the 2019 European Games, in Minsk, Belarus from 21 to 30 June 2019. Austria had previously competed at the 2015 European Games in Baku, Azerbaijan, where it won 13 medals, including 3 golds.

== Medalists ==
Medal	Name	Sport	Event	Date
Gold	Bettina Plank	Karate	Women's kumite 50 kg	30 June
Silver	Franziska Peer; Bernhard Pickl	Shooting	Mixed team 50 metre rifle prone	25 June
Silver	Verena Eberhardt	Cycling	Women's omnium	29 June
Bronze	Daniel Auer	Cycling	Road race	23 June
Bronze	Stephan Hegyi	Judo	Men's + 100kg	24 June
Bronze	Daniel Allerstorfer; Shamil Borchashvili; Marko Bubanja; Sabrina Filzmoser; Bernadette Graf; Stephan Hegyi; Magdalena Krssakova; Michaela Polleres; Lukas Reiter; Katharina Tanzer	Judo	Mixed team	25 June
Bronze	Andreas Graf; Andreas Müller	Cycling	Men's madison	29 June

Medals by sport
Sport	1st place, gold medalist(s)	2nd place, silver medalist(s)	3rd place, bronze medalist(s)	Total
Karate	1	0	0	1
Cycling	0	1	2	3
Shooting	0	1	0	1
Judo	0	0	2	2
Total	1	2	4	7

== Archery ==
Recurve

Athlete	Event	Ranking round		Round of 64	Round of 32	Round of 16	Quarterfinals	Semifinals	Final / BM	
Athlete	Event	Score	Seed	Opposition Score	Opposition Score	Opposition Score	Opposition Score	Opposition Score	Opposition Score	Rank
Andreas Gstöttner	Men's individual	661	15	Bye	Castro (ESP); L 2-6	Did not advance				
Elisabeth Straka	Women's individual	603	38	Nurmsalu (EST); L 4-6	Did not advance					
Andreas Gstöttner; Elisabeth Straka	Mixed team	1264	13	—N/a	Slovenia; W 5–4	Italy; L 0–6	Did not advance			9

== Badminton ==
Athletes	Event	Group stage				Round of 16	Quarterfinals	Semifinals	Finals	Rank
Athletes	Event	Opposition Score	Opposition Score	Opposition Score	Rank	Opposition Score	Opposition Score	Opposition Score	Opposition Score	Rank
Luka Wraber	Men's singles	Abián (ESP); L 0–2	Nikolov (BUL); W 2–1	Nguyen (IRL); L 1–2	3	Did not advance				17
Philip Birker; Dominik Stipsits	Men's doubles	Lamsfuß / Seidel (GER); L 0–2	Vlaar / Yanakiev (BUL); L 0–2	Beketov / Makhnovskiy (UKR); W 2–0	3	Did not advance				17

== Boxing ==
Men

Athlete	Event	Round of 32	Round of 16	Quarterfinals	Semifinals	Final	
Athlete	Event	Opposition Result	Opposition Result	Opposition Result	Opposition Result	Opposition Result	Rank
Ahmet Simsek	60 kg	BYE	Eusse (ESP); L 0–5	Did not advance			
Marcel Rumpler	69 kg	Mangiacapre (ITA); L 2–3	Did not advance				
Edin Avdic	69 kg	Cuadrado (ESP); L 0-5	Did not advance				
Umar Dzambekov	69 kg	Martinsen (NOR); W 5-0	Whittaker (GBR); L 0-5	Did not advance			
Ahmed Hagag	69 kg	Schelstraete (BEL); L 0-5	Did not advance				

== Canoe sprint ==
Women

Athlete	Event	Heats		Semifinal		Final	
Athlete	Event	Time	Rank	Time	Rank	Time	Rank
Ana Roxana Lehaci; Viktoria Schwarz	K-2 200 m	39.730	4 QS	38.101	3 QF	45.913	5

== Cycling ==
=== Road ===
Men

Athlete	Event	Time	Rank
Daniel Auer	Road race	4h 10' 20	3rd place, bronze medalist(s)
Florian Gamper	Road race	4h 10' 58	27
Mario Gamper	Road race	4h 10' 58	44

Women

Athlete	Event	Time	Rank
Kathrin Schweinberger	Road race	3h 08' 13"	11
Sarah Rijkes	Road race	3h 08' 13"	52

=== Track ===
Endurance

Athlete	Event	Points	Rank
Andreas Graf	Men's points race	9	7
Andreas Müller	Men's scratch	—N/a	15
Andreas Graf; Andreas Müller	Men's madison	37	3rd place, bronze medalist(s)
Verena Eberhardt	Women's points race	27	2nd place, silver medalist(s)

Omnium

Athlete	Event	Scratch race		Tempo race		Elimination race		Points race		Total points	Rank
Athlete	Event	Rank	Points	Rank	Points	Rank	Points	Rank	Points	Total points	Rank
Valentin Götzinger	Men's omnium	10	22	8	26	15	12	11	3	63	11
Verena Eberhardt	Women's omnium	16	10	11	20	17	8	2	36	74	11

== Gymnastics ==
=== Artistic ===
Women

Athlete	Event	Apparatus				Total	Rank
Athlete	Event	V	UB	BB	F	Total	Rank
Bianca Frysak	Qualification	12.566	10.366	10.566	11.366	44.864	31

=== Rhythmic ===
Individual

Athlete	Event	Final & Qualification					
Athlete	Event	Hoop	Ball	Clubs	Ribbon	Total	Rank
Nicol Ruprecht	All-around	19.900	16.275	16.950	16.875	70.000	12

== Judo ==
Men

Athlete	Event	Round of 64	Round of 32	Round of 16	Quarterfinals	Semifinals	Repechage	Final / BM	
Athlete	Event	Opposition Result	Opposition Result	Opposition Result	Opposition Result	Opposition Result	Opposition Result	Opposition Result	Rank
Lukas Reiter	−73 kg	Plafky (GER); L 00–10	Did not advance						
Shamil Borchashvili	−81 kg	Mrvaljević (MNE); W 10–00	Petr (CZE); W 10–00	Ivanov (BUL); L 00–11	Did not advance				
Marko Bubanja	−90 kg	Klammert (CZE); L 10–01	Did not advance						
Aaron Fara	−100 kg	—N/a	Pantić (MNE); L 00–10	Did not advance					
Stephan Hegyi	+100 kg	—N/a	Frey (GER); W 10–00	Meyer (NED); L 00–10	Did not advance		Sarnacki (POL); W 11–00	Kokauri (AZE); W 10–00	3rd place, bronze medalist(s)

Women

Athlete	Event	Round of 64	Round of 32	Round of 16	Quarterfinals	Semifinals	Repechage	Final / BM	
Athlete	Event	Opposition Result	Opposition Result	Opposition Result	Opposition Result	Opposition Result	Opposition Result	Opposition Result	Rank
Katharina Tanzer	−48 kg	—N/a	Bye	Costa (POR); L 00–10	Did not advance				
Sabrina Filzmoser	−57 kg	—N/a	Lo Giudice (ITA); W 10–00	Borowska (POL); L 00–10	Did not advance				
Kathrin Unterwurzacher	−63 kg	—N/a	Shemesh (ISR); L 00–01	Did not advance					
Magdalena Krssakova	−63 kg	—N/a	Bye	Schlesinger (GBR); L 00–10	Did not advance				
Michaela Polleres	−70 kg	—N/a	Bye	Timo (POR); W 01–00	Pogorzelec (POL); L 01–11	Did not advance	Bernholm (SWE); L 00–10	Did not advance	
Bernadette Graf	−70 kg	—N/a	Bye	Apotekar (SLO); L 00–10	Did not advance				

Mixed team

Athlete	Event	Round of 16	Quarterfinals	Semifinals	Repechage	Final / BM	
Athlete	Event	Opposition Result	Opposition Result	Opposition Result	Opposition Result	Opposition Result	Rank
Daniel Allerstorfer; Shamil Borchashvili; Marko Bubanja; Sabrina Filzmoser; Bernadette Graf; Stephan Hegyi; Magdalena Krssakova; Michaela Polleres; Lukas Reiter; Katharina Tanzer	Mixed team	Germany; W 4–2	Belarus; L 1–4	Did not advance	Serbia; W 4–1	Netherlands; W 4–2	3rd place, bronze medalist(s)

== Karate ==
Men

Athlete	Event	Group stage				Semifinal	Final	
Athlete	Event	Opposition Score	Opposition Score	Opposition Score	Rank	Opposition Score	Opposition Score	Rank
Stefan Pokorny	−67 kg	Krautsou (BLR); D 0−0	Tadissi (HUN); D 0−0	Hasanov (AZE); W 4−3	3	Did not advance		

Women

Athlete	Event	Group stage				Semifinal	Final	
Athlete	Event	Opposition Score	Opposition Score	Opposition Score	Rank	Opposition Score	Opposition Score	Rank
Bettina Plank	−50 kg	Kryva (UKR); D 0−0	Bouderbane (FRA); W 2−1	Milivojčević (SRB); W 1−0	3 Q	Koulinkovitch (BLR); W 0−0	Özçelik (TUR); W 5−1	1st place, gold medalist(s)

== Shooting ==
Men

Athlete	Event	Qualification		Final	
Athlete	Event	Points	Rank	Points	Rank
Thomas Havlicek	10 m air fire pistol	545	35	Did not advance	
Thomas Havlicek	25 m rapid fire pistol	563	22	Did not advance	
Martin Strempfl	10 m air rifle	623.1	26	Did not advance	
Bernhard Pickl	10 m air rifle	623.1	27	Did not advance	
Alexander Schmirl	50 m rifle three positions	1168	16	Did not advance	
Bernhard Pickl	50 m rifle three positions	1160	26	Did not advance	

Women

Athlete	Event	Qualification		Final	
Athlete	Event	Points	Rank	Points	Rank
Franziska Peer	10 m air rifle	624.6	16	Did not advance	
Olivia Hofmann	10 m air rifle	623.3	25	Did not advance	
Franziska Peer	50 m rifle three positions	1161	8 Q	414	6
Olivia Hofmann	50 m rifle three positions	1160	11	Did not advance	
Sylvia Steiner	10 m air pistol	578	3 Q	135.3	7
Sylvia Steiner	25 m pistol	576	18	Did not advance	

Mixed team

Athlete	Event	Qualification				Final / BM	
Athlete	Event	Stage 1		Stage 2		Final / BM	
Athlete	Event	Points	Rank	Points	Rank	Opposition Result	Rank
Franziska Peer; Martin Strempfl	10 m air rifle	622.2	15	Did not advance			
Sylvia Steiner; Thomas Havlicek	10 m air pistol	563	24	Did not advance			

Athlete	Event	Qualification		Semifinals	Final					
Athlete	Event	Qualification		Semifinals	Round 1		Round 2		Round 3	
Athlete	Event	Points	Rank	Opposition Result	Points	Rank	Points	Rank	Points	Rank
Franziska Peer; Bernhard Pickl	50 m rifle prone	412.5	5 Q	Lustenberger / Dürr (SUI); W 204.1-202.5	208.1	1 Q	208.3+20.6	2 Q	206.6	2nd place, silver medalist(s)
Sylvia Steiner; Thomas Havlicek	25 m standard pistol	549	7 Q	Vennekamp / Geis (GER); L 376.6-385.6	Did not advance					

== Table tennis ==
Athlete	Event	Round 1	Round 2	Round 3	Round of 16	Quarterfinals	Semifinals	Final / BM	
Athlete	Event	Opposition Result	Opposition Result	Opposition Result	Opposition Result	Opposition Result	Opposition Result	Opposition Result	Rank
Robert Gardos	Men's singles	Bye	Cantero (ESP); W 4–3	Karlsson (SWE); L 2–4	Did not advance				
Daniel Habesohn	Men's singles	Bye		Tokič (SLO); L 0–4	Did not advance				
Sofia Polcanova	Women's singles	Bye		Marchetti (BEL); W 4–0	Han (GER); L 0–4	Did not advance			
Amelie Solja	Women's singles	Bye	Carey (GBR); W 4-0	Ni (LUX); L 1–4	Did not advance				
Stefan Fegerl; Sofia Polcanova	Mixed doubles	—N/a			Shibaev; Mikhailova (RUS); L 1–3	Did not advance			
Stefan Fegerl; Robert Gardos; Daniel Habesohn	Men's team	—N/a			Bye	Denmark; L 1–3	Did not advance		
Liu Jia; Sofia Polcanova; Amelie Solja	Women's team	—N/a			Bye	Poland; L 1–3	Did not advance		
