= Belgium at the 2019 European Games =

- IOC code: BEL
- NOC: Belgian Olympic and Interfederal Committee
- Website: teambelgium.be

in Minsk, Belarus 21 – 30 June 2019
- Competitors: 51 in 11 sports
- Flag bearer: Toma Nikiforov (judo)
- Medals Ranked 14th: Gold 4 Silver 1 Bronze 1 Total 6

European Games appearances (overview)
- 2015; 2019; 2023; 2027

Belgium competed at the 2019 European Games, in Minsk, Belarus from 21 to 30 June 2019. Belgium had previously competed at the 2015 European Games in Baku, Azerbaijan, where it won 11 medals, including four golds. The Belgian Olympic Committee sent a total of 51 athletes to the Games to compete in 11 sports.

== Medalists ==
Medal	Name	Sport	Event	Date
Gold	Talia De Troyer; Britt Vanderdonckt; Charlotte Van Royen	Gymnastics	Women's acrobatics groups dynamic	22 June
Gold	Talia De Troyer; Britt Vanderdonckt; Charlotte Van Royen	Gymnastics	Women's acrobatics groups All-around	23 June
Gold	Matthias Casse	Judo	Men's 81 kg	23 June
Gold	Nina Derwael	Gymnastics	Women's balance beam	30 June
Silver	Talia De Troyer; Britt Vanderdonckt; Charlotte Van Royen	Gymnastics	Women's acrobatics groups balance	22 June
Bronze	Jorre Verstraeten	Judo	Men's 60 kg	22 June

== Archery ==
Recurve

Athlete	Event	Ranking round		Round of 64	Round of 32	Round of 16	Quarterfinals	Semifinals	Final / BM	
Athlete	Event	Score	Seed	Opposition Score	Opposition Score	Opposition Score	Opposition Score	Opposition Score	Opposition Score	Rank
Jarno de Smedt	Men's individual	638	35	Henckels (LUX); L 5 (8)-6 (8)	Did not advance					
Charlotte Destrooper	Women's individual	590	41	Pavlova (UKR); L 5 (7)-6 (10)	Did not advance					
Jarno de Smedt; Charlotte Destrooper	Mixed team	1228	21	—	Sweden; L 2–6	Did not advance				17

Compound

Athlete	Event	Ranking round		Round of 16	Quarterfinals	Semifinals	Final / BM	
Athlete	Event	Score	Seed	Opposition Score	Opposition Score	Opposition Score	Opposition Score	Rank
Sarah Prieels	Women's individual	689	11	Jensen (DEN); L 142–145	Did not advance			9

== Badminton ==
Athletes	Event	Group stage				Round of 16	Quarterfinals	Semifinals	Finals	Rank
Athletes	Event	Opposition Score	Opposition Score	Opposition Score	Rank	Opposition Score	Opposition Score	Opposition Score	Opposition Score	Rank
Maxime Moreels	Men's singles	Must (EST); L 0-2 (17-21 12-21)	Antonsen (DEN); L 0-2 (15-21 9-21)	Đurkinjak (CRO); L 1-2 (24-26 21-19 18-21)	4	Did not advance				
Lianne Tan	Women's singles	Kosetskaya (RUS); L 0-2 (15-21 11-21)	Zaitsava (BLR); W 2-0 (21-10 21-8)	Christodoulou (CYP); W 2-0 (21-8 21-18)	2 Q	Gilmour (GBR); L 0-2 (13-21 16-21)	Did not advance			
Lise Jaques; Flore Vandenhoucke	Women's doubles	Cherniavskaya / Zaitsava (BLR); W 2-0 (21-10 21-11)	Lefel / Tran (FRA); L 0-2 (16-21 11-21)	Marran / Rüütel (EST); L 0-2 (13-21 14-21)	3	—	Did not advance			

== Boxing ==
Athlete	Event	Round of 32	Round of 16	Quarterfinals	Semifinals	Final	
Athlete	Event	Opposition Result	Opposition Result	Opposition Result	Opposition Result	Opposition Result	Rank
Vasile Usturoi	Men's 56 kg	Csoka (HUN); W 4-1	McGrail (GBR); L 0-5	Did not advance			
Ibrahima Diallo	Men's 64 kg	Mazur (RUS); L 0-5	Did not advance				
Nabil Messaoudi	Men's 69 kg	Savkovic (MNE); W 5-0	Micallef (MON); L 2-3	Did not advance			
Ruben Veciunca	Men's 75 kg	Harcsa (HUN); L RSC	Did not advance				
Ziad El Mohor	Men's 81 kg	Lazar (SLO); W 4-1	Muzik (CZE); W 5-0	Alfonso (AZE); L 0-5	Did not advance		
Victor Schelstraete	Men's 91 kg	Hagag (AUT); W 5-0	Gadzhimagomedov (RUS); L 0-5	Did not advance			

== Canoeing ==
Athlete	Event	Heats		Semifinals		Finals	
Athlete	Event	Time	Rank	Time	Rank	Time	Rank
Artuur Peters	Men's K1 1000 m	3:34.573	6 QS	3:27.084	2 FA	3:36.323	7
Artuur Peters	Men's K1 5000 m	—				23:08.947	13
Lize Broekx	Women's K1 5000 m	—				26:06.078	7
Lize Broekx; Hermien Peters	Women's K2 500 m	1:40.451	3 QF	—		1:44.826	7

== Cycling ==
=== Track ===
Endurance

Athlete	Event	1st Round	2nd Round	Final
Athlete	Event	Rank	Rank	Rank
Jules Hesters	Men's scratch	—		5th
Gerben Thijssen	Men's points race	—		8th
Gerben Thijssen	Men's individual pursuit	10th	—	Did not advance
Fabio Van den Bossche	Men's omnium	—		6th
Moreno De Pauw; Fabio Van den Bossche	Men's madison	—		4th
Tuur Dens; Moreno De Pauw; Jules Hesters; Gerben Thijssen; Fabio Van den Bossche	Men's team pursuit	4:04.974; 7th Q	4:05.118; 7th	Did not advance
Gilke Croket	Women's scratch	—		16th
Gilke Croket	Women's points race	—		16th
Gilke Croket	Women's omnium	—		16th

Sprint

Athlete	Event	Qualification		Round 1	Repechage 1	Round 2	Repechage 2	Round 3	Repechage 3	Quarterfinals	Semifinals	Final	
Athlete	Event	Time Speed (km/h)	Rank	Opposition Time	Opposition Time	Opposition Time	Opposition Time	Opposition Time	Opposition Time	Opposition Time	Opposition Time	Opposition Time	Rank
Nicky Degrendele	Women's sprint	11.227	11th Q	Capewell (GBR); W	bye	Starikova (UKR); L	Sibiak (POL); W	Gros (FRA); L	Starikova (UKR); Marchant (GBR); L	Did not advance			

Keirin

Athlete	Event	1st Round	Repechage	2nd Round	Final
Athlete	Event	Rank	Rank	Rank	Rank
Nicky Degrendele	Women's keirin	1st Q	—	4th QB	7th

== Gymnastics ==
=== Acrobatic ===
Athlete	Event	Exercise			Total	Rank
Athlete	Event	Balance	Dynamic	Combined	Total	Rank
Talia De Troyer; Britt Vanderdonckt; Charlotte Van Royen	Women's group all-around	—			29.960	1st place, gold medalist(s)
Talia De Troyer; Britt Vanderdonckt; Charlotte Van Royen	Women's group balance	—			29.230	2nd place, silver medalist(s)
Talia De Troyer; Britt Vanderdonckt; Charlotte Van Royen	Women's group dynamic	—			28.830	1st place, gold medalist(s)

=== Artistic ===
Athlete	Event	Qualification								Final							
Athlete	Event	Apparatus						Total	Rank	Apparatus						Total	Rank
Athlete	Event	F	PH	R	V	PB	HB	Total	Rank	F	PH	R	V	PB	HB	Total	Rank
Jimmy Verbaeys	Men's all-around	13.933	12.700	11.533	13.133	13.933	13.600	78.832	17th Q	13.733	13.100	11.966	13.766	13.466	12.400	78.431	16th

Athlete	Event	Qualification						Final					
Athlete	Event	Apparatus				Total	Rank	Apparatus				Total	Rank
Athlete	Event	V	UB	BB	F	Total	Rank	V	UB	BB	F	Total	Rank
Senna Deriks	Women's all-around	13.266	13.533	11.500	11.833	50.132	16th Q	13.400	13.466	12.733	12.333	51.932	6th
Fien Enghels	Women's all-around	Did not start						Did not advance					
Nina Derwael	Women's all-around	—	14.433 Q	13.600 Q	—	28.033	35th	Did not advance					
Nina Derwael	Women's uneven bars	—							13.933	—			4th
Nina Derwael	Women's balance beam	—								13.766	—		1st place, gold medalist(s)

== Judo ==
Athlete	Event	Round of 64	Round of 32	Round of 16	Quarterfinals	Semifinals	Repechage	Final / BM	
Athlete	Event	Opposition Result	Opposition Result	Opposition Result	Opposition Result	Opposition Result	Opposition Result	Opposition Result	Rank
Jorre Verstraeten	Men's 60 kg	—	Gerchev (BUL); W 10s2 - 0s3	Safarov (AZE); W 10s2 - 0s1	Garrigós (ESP); L 0 - 10	Did not advance	Mkheidze (FRA); W 10s2 - 0	Khyar (FRA); W 10s2 - 0s1	3rd place, bronze medalist(s)
Kenneth Van Gansbeke	Men's 66 kg	Sandal (TUR); W 10s2 - 1	Shamilov (RUS); W 10s2 - 0s3	Burns (IRL); L 0s1 - 1s1	Did not advance				
Abdul Malik Umayev	Men's 73 kg	Shoka (BLR); L 1s2 - 10s1	Did not advance						
Matthias Casse	Men's 81 kg	bye	Parlati (ITA); W 10 - 1s1	Pacek (SWE); W 1s1 - 0s2	Wieczerzak (GER); W 1s2 - 0s1	Maisuradze (GEO); W 10s1 - 0s2	—	Ivanov (BUL); W 1 - 0	1st place, gold medalist(s)
Sami Chouchi	Men's 81 kg	bye	Mendiola (ESP); W 10 - 0s1	Ungvari (HUN); L 0s1 - 1s2	Did not advance				
Joachim Bottieau	Men's 90 kg	bye	Khalmurzaev (RUS); L 0s3 - 10s2	Did not advance					
Toma Nikiforov	Men's 100 kg	—	Borodavko (LAT); W 1s2 - 0s1	Kotsoiev (AZE); W 10s2 - 1s1	Adamian (RUS); L 0 - 10	Did not advance	Mukete (BLR); L 1 - 10	Did not advance	7th
Amber Ryheul	Women's 52 kg	—	Gneto (FRA); L 0s3 - 10s1	Did not advance					
Charline Van Snick	Women's 52 kg	—	bye	Mammadaliyeva (AZE); L 0s3 - 10s2	Did not advance				
Mina Libeer	Women's 57 kg	—	Perisic (CRO); W 11 - 1s2	Starke (GER); L 0 - 10	Did not advance				
Roxane Taeymans	Women's 70 kg	—	Matić (CRO); L 0s1 - 10	Did not advance					
Gabriella Willems	Women's 70 kg	—	Timo (POR); L 0 - 1s1	Did not advance					

== Karate ==
Athlete	Event	Group stage			Semifinal	Final / BM	
Athlete	Event	Opposition Score	Opposition Score	Opposition Score	Opposition Score	Opposition Score	Rank
Jess Rosiello	Men's kumite 67 kg	Uygur (TUR); D 0-0	Hodžić (MNE); L 2-3	Maresca (ITA); L 0-3	Did not advance		

== Sambo ==
Athlete	Event	Quarterfinal	Semifinal	Repechage	Final / BM	
Athlete	Event	Opposition Score	Opposition Score	Opposition Score	Opposition Score	Rank
Deborah Masy	Women's 80 kg	Kovalska (UKR); L 0-9	Did not advance	Tsimashenka (BLR); L 1-10	Did not advance	7th

== Shooting ==
Athlete	Event	Qualification		Final	
Athlete	Event	Points	Rank	Points	Rank
Maxime Mottet	Men's trap	105	29th	Did not advance	
Yannick Peeters	Men's trap	116	11th	Did not advance	

== Table tennis ==
Athlete	Event	Round 1	Round 2	Round 3	Round 4	Quarterfinals	Semifinals	Final / BM
Athlete	Event	Opposition Score	Opposition Score	Opposition Score	Opposition Score	Opposition Score	Opposition Score	Rank
Florent Lambiet	Men's singles	bye	Stoyanov (ITA); L 0-4	Did not advance				
Cédric Nuytinck	Men's singles	bye		Olah (FIN); W 4-2	Gaćina (CRO); W 4-3	Kou (UKR); L 2-4	Did not advance	
Lisa Lung	Women's singles	bye	Gasnier (FRA); L 0-4	Did not advance				
Nathalie Marchetti	Women's singles	bye	Pergel (HUN); W 4-3	Polcanova (AUT); L 0-4	Did not advance			
Robin Devos; Florent Lambiet; Cédric Nuytinck	Men's team	—			Croatia; L 1-3	Did not advance		
Lisa Lung; Cédric Nuytinck	Mixed doubles	—		Ionescu / Szocs (ROU); L 1-3	Did not advance			
