= Artsiom Krautsou =

Belarusian karateka (born 1991)

Personal information
- Born: September 20, 1991 (age 34)

Sport
- Country: Belarus
- Sport: Karate
- Weight class: 67 kg
- Event: Kumite
Medal record
Men's karate
Representing Belarus
European Games
Bronze medal – third place	2019 Minsk	67 kg

Artsiom Krautsou (born September 20, 1991) is a Belarusian karateka. He won one of the bronze medals in the men's kumite 67 kg event at the 2019 European Games held in Minsk, Belarus.

In 2018, he competed in the men's 67 kg event at the World Karate Championships held in Madrid, Spain.

== Achievements ==
Year	Competition	Venue	Rank	Event
2019	European Games	Minsk, Belarus	3rd	Kumite 67 kg
