= Germany at the 2019 European Games =

- IOC code: GER
- NOC: German Olympic Sports Confederation
- Website: www.dosb.de

in Minsk, Belarus 21 – 30 June 2019
- Competitors: 149 in 13 sports
- Flag bearer: Lisa Unruh (archery)
- Medals Ranked 7th: Gold 7 Silver 6 Bronze 13 Total 26

European Games appearances (overview)
- 2015; 2019; 2023; 2027

Germany competed at the 2019 European Games, in Minsk, Belarus from 21 to 30 June 2019. Germany has previously competed at the 2015 European Games in Baku, Azerbaijan, where it won 66 medals, including sixteen golds.

== Medalists ==
Medal	Name	Sport	Event	Date
Gold	Petrissa Solja; Patrick Franziska	Table tennis	Mixed team doubles	25 June
Gold	Max Hoff; Jacob Schopf	Canoe sprint	Men's K–2 1000 metres	26 June
Gold	Oliver Geis	Shooting	Men's 25 m rapid fire pistol	26 June
Gold	Timo Boll	Table tennis	Men's singles	26 June
Gold	Oliver Geis; Doreen Vennekamp	Shooting	Mixed team 25 m standard pistol	28 June
Gold	Han Ying; Nina Mittelham; Shan Xiaona; Petrissa Solja	Table tennis	Women's team	29 June
Gold	Timo Boll; Patrick Franziska; Dimitrij Ovtcharov	Table tennis	Men's team	29 June
Silver	Han Ying	Table tennis	Women's singles	26 June
Silver	Max Rendschmidt; Ronald Rauhe; Tom Liebscher; Max Lemke	Canoe sprint	Men's K–4 500 metres	27 June
Silver	Lisa Jahn	Canoe sprint	Women's C–1 200 metres	27 June
Silver	Franziska John; Tina Dietze	Canoe sprint	Women's K–2 200 metres	27 June
Silver	Christian Reitz; Monika Karsch	Shooting	Mixed team 25 m standard pistol	28 June
Silver	Francy Rädelt	Wrestling	Women's freestyle −76 kg	28 June
Bronze	Sandra Reitz; Christian Reitz	Shooting	Mixed team 10 m air pistol	22 June
Bronze	Pauline Starke	Judo	Women's 57 kg	22 June
Bronze	Cedric Rieger; Michelle Kroppen	Archery	Mixed team recurve	23 June
Bronze	Sebastian Brendel	Canoe sprint	Men's C–1 1000 metres	26 June
Bronze	Ahmed Dudarov	Wrestling	Men's freestyle −86 kg	26 June
Bronze	Max Hoff	Canoe sprint	Men's K–1 5000 metres	27 June
Bronze	Nina Hemmer	Wrestling	Women's freestyle −53 kg	27 June
Bronze	Nadine Apetz	Boxing	Women's welterweight	28 June
Bronze	Nelive Tiafack	Boxing	Men's super-heavyweight	28 June
Bronze	Michael Pohl; Melanie Bauschke; Sina Mayer; Annika Fuchs; Karolina Pahlitzsch; Maximilian Grupen; Arne Leppelsack; Corinna Schwab; Maximilian Bayer; Falk Wendrich; Franziska Hofmann; Christoph Kessler; Majtie Kolberg; Johannes Trefz; Pernilla Kramer	Athletics	Team event	28 June
Bronze	Sharafa Raman	Boxing	Men's bantamweight	28 June
Bronze	Jonathan Horne	Karate	Men's kumite +84 kg	29 June
Bronze	Jana Bitsch	Karate	Women's kumite 55 kg	30 June

Medals by sport
Sport	1st place, gold medalist(s)	2nd place, silver medalist(s)	3rd place, bronze medalist(s)	Total
Table tennis	4	1	0	5
Shooting	2	1	1	4
Canoe sprint	1	3	2	6
Wrestling	0	1	2	3
Boxing	0	0	3	3
Karate	0	0	2	2
Archery	0	0	1	1
Athletics	0	0	1	1
Judo	0	0	1	1
Total	7	6	13	26

Medals by date
Day	Date	1st place, gold medalist(s)	2nd place, silver medalist(s)	3rd place, bronze medalist(s)	Total
Day 1	22 June	0	0	2	2
Day 2	23 June	0	0	1	1
Day 3	24 June	0	0	0	0
Day 4	25 June	1	0	0	1
Day 5	26 June	3	1	2	6
Day 6	27 June	0	3	2	5
Day 7	28 June	1	2	4	7
Day 8	29 June	2	0	1	3
Day 9	30 June	0	0	1	1
Total		7	6	13	26

== Archery ==
Recurve

Athlete	Event	Ranking round		Round of 64	Round of 32	Round of 16	Quarterfinals	Semifinals	Final / BM	
Athlete	Event	Score	Seed	Opposition Score	Opposition Score	Opposition Score	Opposition Score	Opposition Score	Opposition Score	Rank
Cedric Rieger	Men's individual	646	28	Popov (RUS); W 6–2	Chirault (FRA); L 4–6	Did not advance				
Michelle Kroppen	Women's individual	645	11	Bye	Richter (GER); W 6–2	Boari (ITA); L 2–6	Did not advance			
Elena Richter	Women's individual	627	22	Gasımova (AZE); W 6–0	Kroppen (GER); L 2–6	Did not advance				
Lisa Unruh	Women's individual	610	33	Mikloș (ROU); W 6–2	Bayardo (NED); L 1–7	Did not advance				
Michelle Kroppen; Elena Richter; Lisa Unruh	Women's team	1882	6	—N/a			Italy; W 6–0	Belarus; L 1–5	BM; Denmark; L 4–5	4
Cedric Rieger; Michelle Kroppen	Mixed team	1291	11	—N/a	Cyprus; W 6–0	Spain; W 6–2	Turkey; W 6–0	Great Britain; L 4–5	BM; Belarus; W 6–2	3rd place, bronze medalist(s)

Compound

Athlete	Event	Ranking round		Round of 16	Quarterfinals	Semifinals	Final / BM	
Athlete	Event	Score	Seed	Opposition Score	Opposition Score	Opposition Score	Opposition Score	Rank
Marcel Trachsel	Men's individual	681	15	Schloesser (NED); L 148–149	Did not advance			
Janine Meißner	Women's individual	680	13	Marcos (ESP); W 143 (10*)–143 (10)	Bostan (TUR); L139–145	Did not advance		
Marcel Trachsel; Janine Meißner	Mixed team	1261	9	Belarus; W 155–146	Russia; L 143–154	Did not advance		

== Athletics ==
Individual events

Athlete	Event	Final	
Athlete	Event	Result	Rank
Michael Pohl	Men's 100 m	10.54	5
Maximilian Bayer	Men's 110 m hurdles	13.80	4
Falk Wendrich	Men's high jump	2.11	8
Sina Mayer	Women's 100 m	11.93	19
Franziska Hofmann	Women's 100 m hurdles	13.32	5
Melanie Bauschke	Women's long jump	5.78	19
Annika Fuchs	Women's javelin throw	58.23	9
Karolina Pahlitzsch; Maximilian Grupen; Arne Leppelsack; Corinna Schwab	Mixed 4 x 400 m relay	3:21.90	8
Marc Koch; Oskar Schwarzer; Majtie Kolberg; Pernilla Kramer	Mixed distance pursuit relay	4:33.63	12

Team event

Athlete	Event	Qualification		Quarterfinals		Semifinals		Final	
Athlete	Event	Time	Rank	Time	Rank	Time	Rank	Time	Rank
Michael Pohl; Melanie Bauschke; Sina Mayer; Annika Fuchs; Karolina Pahlitzsch; Maximilian Grupen; Arne Leppelsack; Corinna Schwab; Maximilian Bayer; Falk Wendrich; Franziska Hofmann; Christoph Kessler; Majtie Kolberg; Johannes Trefz; Pernilla Kramer	Team event	4:33.63	1 QSFNL	Bye		4:32.12	3 Q	4:34.77	3rd place, bronze medalist(s)

== Badminton ==
Athletes	Event	Group stage				Round of 16	Quarterfinals	Semifinals	Final	Rank
Athletes	Event	Opposition Score	Opposition Score	Opposition Score	Rank	Opposition Score	Opposition Score	Opposition Score	Opposition Score	Rank
Alexander Roovers	Men's singles	Krausz (HUN); L 0–2	Lale (TUR); L Retired	Axelsen (DEN); Walkover	3	Did not advance				
Yvonne Li	Women's singles	Mikkelä (FIN); W 2–0	Darragh (IRL); W 2–0	Korosi (HUN); W 2–0	1 Q	Kuuba (EST); W 2–1	Kosetskaya (RUS); L 0–2	Did not advance		
Mark Lamsfuß; Marvin Emil Seidel	Men's doubles	Birker / Stipsits (AUT); W 2–0	Beketov / Makhnovskiy (UKR); W 2–0	Vlaar / Yanakiev (BUL); W 2–0	1 Q	—N/a	Maas / Tabeling (NED); L 1–2	Did not advance		
Johanna Goliszewski; Lara Käpplein	Women's doubles	Piek / Seinen (NED); L 0–2	Bášová / Fuchsová (CZE); W 2–0	Erçetin / İnci (TUR); L 0–2	3	—N/a	Did not advance			
Mark Lamsfuß; Isabel Herttrich	Mixed doubles	Śmiłowski / Świerczyńska (POL); W 2–0	Tabeling / Piek (NED); L 0–2	Zilberman / Zilberman (ISR); W Retired	2 Q	—N/a	Smith / Ellis (GBR); L 0–2	Did not advance		

== Basketball 3x3 ==
Team roster

Women

- Svenja Brunckhorst
- Ama Degbeon
- Sonja Greinacher
- Satou Sabally

Summary

Team	Event	Group stage				Quarterfinals	Semifinals	Final / BM	
Team	Event	Opposition Score	Opposition Score	Opposition Score	Rank	Opposition Score	Opposition Score	Opposition Score	Rank
Germany women's	Women's tournament	Romania; W 21–8	Hungary; W 19–9	Czech Republic; W 21–14	1 Q	Spain; W 20–11	France; L 10–11	BM; Belarus; L 16–21	4

== Boxing ==
Men

Athlete	Event	Round of 32	Round of 16	Quarterfinals	Semifinals	Final	
Athlete	Event	Opposition Result	Opposition Result	Opposition Result	Opposition Result	Opposition Result	Rank
Salah Ibrahim Omar	49 kg	—N/a	Alakhverdovi (GEO); L 2–3	did not advance			
Hamza Touba	52 kg	Çiftçi (TUR); W 3–2	Asenov (BUL); L 0–5	did not advance			
Sharafa Raman	56 kg	Vacula (MDA); W RSC	Quiles (ESP); W 4–1	Gomtsyan (GEO); W 4–1	Butsenko (UKR); L 2–3	Did not advance	3rd place, bronze medalist(s)
Hamsat Shadalov	60 kg	Szachbazian (CZE); W 5–0	Dogan (TUR); W 5–0	Mamedov (RUS); L 0–5	Did not advance		
Wladislaw Baryshnik	64 kg	Konovalov (SRB); L 1–4	did not advance				
Magomed Schachidov	69 kg	Fetahović (BIH); L 2–3	did not advance				
Arthur Beck	75 kg	Csemez (SVK); L 2–3	did not advance				
Abdulrahman Abu-Lubdeh	81 kg	Nuha (SWE); W 3–2	Kasparian (NED); W 3–2	Whittaker (GBR); L 1–4	Did not advance		
Eugen Waigel	91 kg	Jovanović (SRB); W w/o	Mouhiidine (ITA); L 0–5	Did not advance			
Nelvie Tiafack	+91 kg	Kulik (POL); W 5–0	Clarke (GBR); W 3–2	Hovhannisyan (ARM); W 3–2	Aliev (FRA); L 1–4	Did not advance	3rd place, bronze medalist(s)

Women

Athlete	Event	Round of 16	Quarterfinals	Semifinals	Final	
Athlete	Event	Opposition Result	Opposition Result	Opposition Result	Opposition Result	Rank
Ornella Wahner	57 kg	Bye	Walsh (IRL); L 1–4	Did not advance		
Nadine Apetz	69 kg	Bye	Budai (HUN); W 5–0	Canfora (ITA); L 2–3	Did not advance	3rd place, bronze medalist(s)
Sarah Scheurich	75 kg	Bye	Wojcik (POL); L 1–4	Did not advance		

== Canoe sprint ==
Men

Athlete	Event	Heats		Semifinal		Final	
Athlete	Event	Time	Rank	Time	Rank	Time	Rank
Jan Vandrey	C–1 200 m	45.894	8 QS	40.607	6	Did not advance	
Sebastian Brendel	C–1 1000 m	3:49.341	3 QF	—N/a		3:59.278	3rd place, bronze medalist(s)
Yul Oeltze; Peter Kretschmer	C–2 1000 m	3:32.956	3 QF	—N/a		3:43.427	4
Timo Haseleu	K–1 200 m	35.677	5 QS	35.433	6 FB	38.246	11
Tamas Gecsö	K–1 1000 m	3:40.605	6 QS	3:32.686	8	Did not advance	
Max Hoff	K–1 5000 m	—N/a				21:49.276	3rd place, bronze medalist(s)
Max Hoff; Jacob Schopf	K–2 1000 m	3:07.591	1 QF	—N/a		3:18.175	1st place, gold medalist(s)
Max Rendschmidt; Ronald Rauhe; Tom Liebscher; Max Lemke	K–4 500 m	1:18.869	1 QF	—N/a		1:32.541	2nd place, silver medalist(s)

Women

Athlete	Event	Heats		Semifinal		Final	
Athlete	Event	Time	Rank	Time	Rank	Time	Rank
Lisa Jahn	C–1 200 m	47.121	2 QF	—N/a		51.656	2nd place, silver medalist(s)
Lisa Jahn; Ophelia Preller	C–2 500 m	1:57.082	2 QF	—N/a		2:14.789	4
Sabrina Hering-Pradler	K–1 200 m	44.008	6 QS	42.652	6 FB	46.060	13
Conny Wassmuth	K–1 500 m	1:50.797	4 QS	1:52.649	4 FB	2:09.238	12
Jasmin Fritz	K–1 5000 m	—N/a				26:08.844	10
Franziska John; Tina Dietze	K–2 200 m	37.761	1 QF	—N/a		44.961	2nd place, silver medalist(s)
Jasmin Fritz; Steffi Kriegerstein	K–2 500 m	1:41.446	4 QS	1:38.942	1 QF	1:43.943	4
Sabrina Hering-Pradler; Franziska John; Caroline Arft; Tina Dietze	K–4 500 m	1:30.859	2 QF	—N/a		1:43.294	4

== Cycling ==
=== Road ===
Men

Athlete	Event	Time	Rank
Nico Denz	Road race	4:10:58	56
Nico Denz	Time trial	35:01.17	11
Christopher Hatz	Road race	4:11:41	74
Christopher Hatz	Time trial	34:48.63	10
Christian Koch	Road race	4:23:56	110
Alexander Krieger	Road race	4:10:58	18
Paul Taebling	Road race	4:21:27	101

Women

Athlete	Event	Time	Rank
Romy Kasper	Road race	3:08:35	37
Clara Koppenburg	Road race	3:08:24	26
Clara Koppenburg	Time trial	38:36.93	8
Liane Lippert	Road race	3:08:13	7
Hannah Ludwig	Road race	3:09:36	62
Christa Riffel	Road race	3:08:24	23
Christa Riffel	Time trial	39:49.99	16

== Judo ==
Men

Athlete	Event	Round of 64	Round of 32	Round of 16	Quarterfinals	Semifinals	Repechage	Final / BM	
Athlete	Event	Opposition Result	Opposition Result	Opposition Result	Opposition Result	Opposition Result	Opposition Result	Opposition Result	Rank
Moritz Plafky	−60 kg	—N/a	Mansinho (POR); W 10–0s1	Oguzov (RUS); W 1s2–0	Mkheidze (FRA); W 10s1–0s2	Garrigós (ESP); L 0s2–1s1	—N/a	BM; Papinashvili (GEO); L 0s2–1s1	5
Sebastian Seidl	−66 kg	Bye	Lombardo (ITA); L 00s1–10s1	did not advance					
Anthony Zingg	−73 kg	Pertelson (EST); W 10–0s2	Macias (SWE); L 0s2–10s2	did not advance					
Timo Cavelius	−81 kg	Bye	de Wit (NED); L 0–1s1	did not advance					
Alexander Wieczerzak	−81 kg	Bye	Štancel (SVK); W 10–0	Gardašević (MNE); W 10–0s1	Casse (BEL); L 0s1–1s2	Did not advance	McWatt (GBR); W 11s1–1	BM; Ungvari (HUN); L 0s2–1s1	5
Eduard Trippel	−90 kg	Bye	Randl (SVK); L 0–1	did not advance					
Karl-Richard Frey	-100 kg	—N/a	Dvärby (SWE); W 1s2–0s2	Pantić (MNE); L 0s1–10s2	did not advance				
Johannes Frey	+100 kg	—N/a	Allerstorfer (AUT); L 0h-10s1	did not advance					
Sven Heinle	+100 kg	—N/a	Vakhaviak (BLR); W 10s2–0	Hegyi (AUT); L 0s2–10	did not advance				

Women

Athlete	Event	Round of 32	Round of 16	Quarterfinals	Semifinals	Repechage	Final / BM	
Athlete	Event	Opposition Result	Opposition Result	Opposition Result	Opposition Result	Opposition Result	Opposition Result	Rank
Katharina Menz	−48 kg	Siderot (POR); L 0–1	Did not advance					
Sappho Coban	−57 kg	Ilieva (BUL); W 1–0	Karakas (HUN); W 1s1–0	Equisoain (ESP); W 1s1–0	Mezhetskaia (RUS); L 0s1–10	—N/a	BM; Starke (GER); L 0–10	5
Pauline Starke	−57 kg	Konkina (RUS); W 11–0	Libeer (BEL); W 10–0	Gjakova (KOS); L 0–10	Did not advance	Borowska (POL); W 10s1–1	BM; Coban (GER); W 0–1	3rd place, bronze medalist(s)
Martyna Trajdos	−63 kg	Bye	Dobre (ROU); W 10–0	Schlesinger (GBR); L 1s1–10s2	Did not advance	Ozdoba-Blach (POL); W 10s2–0h	BM; Vermeer (NED); L 1s1–10s2	5
Miriam Butkereit	−70 kg	Teltsidou (GRE); L 0–11	did not advance					
Laura Vargas Koch	−70 kg	Polling (NED); L 0s1–11	did not advance					
Luise Malzahn	−78 kg	Bye	Pacut (POL); W 10–0	Malonga (FRA); W 10s1–0h	Apotekar (SLO); L 0s2–1s1	—N/a	BM; Kuka (KOS); L 1s1–10s1	5
Anna-Maria Wagner	−78 kg	Bye	Prodan (CRO); W 10–0	Verkerk (NED); L 0–10s2	Did not advance	Kuka (KOS); L 0s2–1	did not advance	
Jasmin Külbs	+78 kg	Akbulut (TUR); W 10–0	Kindzerska (AZE); L 0s1–10	did not advance				

Mixed team

Athlete	Event	Round of 16	Quarterfinals	Semifinals	Repechage	Final / BM	
Athlete	Event	Opposition Result	Opposition Result	Opposition Result	Opposition Result	Opposition Result	Rank
Sappho Coban; Luise Malzahn; Miriam Butkereit; Anthony Zingg; Johannes Frey; Alexander Wieczerzak	Mixed team	Austria; L 2–4	Did not advance				

== Karate ==
Kata

Athletes	Event	Elimination round		Ranking Round		Final / BM	
Athletes	Event	Score	Rank	Score	Rank	Opposition Score	Rank
Ilja Smorguner	Men's	24.66	2 Q	24.96	2 QB	BM; Heydarov (AZE); L 24.54–25.46	5
Jasmin Jüttner	Women's	23.43	4	Did not advance			

Kumite

Men

Athletes	Event	Group stage				Semifinals	Final	Rank
Athletes	Event	Opposition Score	Opposition Score	Opposition Score	Rank	Opposition Score	Opposition Score	Rank
Noah Bitsch	75 kg	Korabau (BLR); W 4–0	Artamonov (EST); D 0–0	Horuna (UKR); L 0–1	3	Did not advance		
Jonathan Horne	+84 kg	Yamanoğlu (TUR); W 4–0	Gurbanli (AZE); D 0–0	Lardy (NED); D 0–0	2 Q	Kvesić (CRO); L 0–1	Did not advance	3rd place, bronze medalist(s)

Women

Athletes	Event	Group stage				Semifinals	Final	Rank
Athletes	Event	Opposition Score	Opposition Score	Opposition Score	Rank	Opposition Score	Opposition Score	Rank
Shara Hubrich	50 kg	Koulinkovitch (BLR); L 0–3	Aliyeva (AZE); W 2–1	Arapoğlu (TUR); W 1–0	3	did not advance		
Jana Bitsch	55 kg	Warling (LUX); D 0–0	Sharykhina (BLR); W 5–2	Banaszczyk (POL); D 0–0	1 Q	Terliuga (UKR); L 2–8	Did not advance	3rd place, bronze medalist(s)

== Sambo ==
Men

Athlete	Event	Quarterfinals	Semifinals	Final / BM	
Athlete	Event	Opposition Result	Opposition Result	Opposition Result	Rank
Nam Vu	−62 kg	Chirgadze (GEO); L 0–8	Repechage; Yevdoshenko (UKR); L 0–8	Did not advance	

Women

Athlete	Event	Quarterfinals	Semifinals	Final / BM	
Athlete	Event	Opposition Result	Opposition Result	Opposition Result	Rank
Jule Horn	−64 kg	Perin (ITA); L 0–7	Repechage; Cabas (ESP); L 0–8	Did not advance	

== Shooting ==
Men

Athlete	Event	Qualification		Final	
Athlete	Event	Points	Rank	Points	Rank
Julian Justus	10 m air rifle	621.3	31	Did not advance	
André Link	10 m air rifle	620.3	32	Did not advance	
Maximilian Dallinger	50 m rifle 3 positions	1164	20	Did not advance	
Christian Reitz	10 m air pistol	578	9	Did not advance	
Kevin Venta	10 m air pistol	571	22	Did not advance	
Oliver Geis	25 m rapid fire pistol	581	3 Q	33	1st place, gold medalist(s)
Christian Reitz	25 m rapid fire pistol	588	1 Q	14	5
Andreas Löw	Trap	111	22	Did not advance	
Paul Pigorsch	Trap	106	28	Did not advance	
Sven Korte	Skeet	118	14	Did not advance	

Women

Athlete	Event	Qualification		Final	
Athlete	Event	Points	Rank	Points	Rank
Jolyn Beer	10 m air rifle	626.4	7	118.0	8
Julia Simon	10 m air rifle	624.0	21	Did not advance	
Jolyn Beer	50 m rifle 3 positions	1174	1 Q	400.3	8
Isabella Straub	50 m rifle 3 positions	1153	22	Did not advance	
Julia Hochmuth	10 m air pistol	569	17	Did not advance	
Sandra Reitz	10 m air pistol	567	22	Did not advance	
Monika Karsch	25 m pistol	589	1 Q	22	5
Doreen Vennekamp	25 m pistol	583	7 Q	20	6
Katrin Quooß	Trap	98	24	Did not advance	
Sonja Scheibl	Trap	103	12	Did not advance	
Vanessa Hauff	Skeet	106	22	Did not advance	
Katrin Wieslhuber	Skeet	108	18	Did not advance	

Mixed team

Athlete	Event	Qualification		Semifinals		Final / BM	
Athlete	Event	Points	Rank	Points	Rank	Opposition Result	Rank
Maximilian Dallinger; Jolyn Beer	10 m air rifle	621.9	16	Did not advance			
Julia Simon; Julian Justus	10 m air rifle	623.6	12	Did not advance			
Selina Gschwandtner; André Link	50 m rifle prone	412.0	8 Q	200.6	8	Did not advance	
Isabella Straub; Maximilian Dallinger	50 m rifle prone	414.6	2 Q	205.3	2 QF	204.8	4
Christian Reitz; Sandra Reitz	10 m air pistol	573	7 Q	382	3 QB	Chaika / Kurdzi (BLR); W 16–8	3rd place, bronze medalist(s)
Kevin Venta; Julia Hochmuth	10 m air pistol	564	22	Did not advance			
Monika Karsch; Christian Reitz	25 m pistol	566	1 Q	384.3	3 Q	192.5	2nd place, silver medalist(s)
Doreen Vennekamp; Oliver Geis	25 m pistol	564	2 Q	385.6	1 Q	199.5	1st place, gold medalist(s)
Andreas Löw; Sonja Scheibl	Trap	120	21	did not advance			
Paul Pigorsch; Katrin Quooß	Trap	115	23	did not advance			
Sven Korte; Vanessa Hauff	Skeet	128	19	did not advance			

== Table tennis ==
Athlete	Event	Round 1	Round 2	Round 3	Round 4	Quarterfinals	Semifinals	Final / BM	
Athlete	Event	Opposition Result	Opposition Result	Opposition Result	Opposition Result	Opposition Result	Opposition Result	Opposition Result	Rank
Timo Boll	Men's singles	Bye		Dyjas (POL); W 4–1	Freitas (POR); W 4–0	Samsonov (BLR); W 4–1	Pucar (CRO); W 4–1	Groth (DEN); W 4–2	1st place, gold medalist(s)
Dimitrij Ovtcharov	Men's singles	Bye		Sgouropoulos (GRE); W 4–0	Groth (DEN); L 0–4	did not advance			
Timo Boll; Patrick Franziska; Dimitrij Ovtcharov	Men's team	Bye	—N/a			Romania; W 3–0	Portugal; W 3–0	Sweden; W 3–0	1st place, gold medalist(s)
Petrissa Solja	Women's singles	Bye		Yılmaz (TUR); W 4–0	Li (POL); W 4–3	Yu (POR); L 3–4	Did not advance		
Han Ying	Women's singles	Bye		de Nutte (LUX); W 4–0	Polcanova (AUT); W 4–0	Li (NED); W 4–1	Yang (MON); W 4–3	Yu (POR); L 2–4	2nd place, silver medalist(s)
Nina Mittelham; Petrissa Solja; Han Ying; Shan Xiaona	Women's team	Bye	—N/a			Netherlands; W 3–1	Poland; W 3–2	Romania; W 3–0	1st place, gold medalist(s)
Patrick Franziska; Petrissa Solja	Mixed doubles	Falck / Ekholm (SWE); W 3–1	—N/a			Stoyanov / Piccolin (ITA); W 3–0	Pištej / Balážová (SVK); W 3–1	Ionescu / Szőcs (ROU); W 3–0	1st place, gold medalist(s)

== Wrestling ==
Men's freestyle

Athlete	Event	Round of 16	Quarterfinal	Semifinal	Repechage	Final / BM	
Athlete	Event	Opposition Result	Opposition Result	Opposition Result	Opposition Result	Opposition Result	Rank
Kubilay Cakici	−74 kg	Vasilioglo (ROU); L 6–11	did not advance				
Ahmed Dudarov	−86 kg	Savvoulidis (GRE); W 10–0	Friev (ESP); W 8–2	Shabanau (BLR); L 0–3	—N/a	BM; Erdin (TUR); W 10–8	3rd place, bronze medalist(s)
Gennadij Cudinovic	−97 kg	Bye	Hushtyn (BLR); L 0–10	Did not advance			
Nick Matuhin	−125 kg	Ligeti (HUN); L 0–3	did not advance				

Women's freestyle

Athlete	Event	Round of 16	Quarterfinal	Semifinal	Repechage	Final / BM	
Athlete	Event	Opposition Result	Opposition Result	Opposition Result	Opposition Result	Opposition Result	Rank
Nina Hemmer	−53 kg	Schedler (AUT); W 10–0	Kaladzinskaya (BLR); W 7–6	Mattsson (SWE); L 2–10	—N/a	BM; Yetgil (TUR); W 2–0	3rd place, bronze medalist(s)
Luzie Manzke	−62 kg	Gambarova (AZE); L 0–4	Did not advance		Madrowska (POL); L 2–3	Did not advance	
Nadine Weinauge	−68 kg	Anghel (ROU); L 0–5	Did not advance				
Francy Rädelt	−76 kg	Solheim (NOR); W 12–2	Özbeğe (TUR); W 7–0	Aliyeva (AZE); W 11–1	—N/a	Marzaliuk (BLR); L 0–9	2nd place, silver medalist(s)

Men's Greco-Roman

Athlete	Event	Round of 16	Quarterfinal	Semifinal	Repechage	Final / BM	
Athlete	Event	Opposition Result	Opposition Result	Opposition Result	Opposition Result	Opposition Result	Rank
Christopher Krämer	−60 kg	Angelov (BUL); L 3–5	Did not advance				
Erik Weiß	−67 kg	Kabaloev (RUS); L 0–9	Did not advance		Daurov (BLR); L Injury	Did not advance	
Florian Neumaier	−77 kg	Liakh (BLR); L 1–3	Did not advance				
Muhammed Sever	−97 kg	Noumonvi (FRA); L 5–6	Did not advance				
Jello Krahmer	−130 kg	Semenov (RUS); L 0–2	Did not advance				
