= Mario Hodžić =

Montenegrin karateka

Sport
- Country: Montenegro
- Sport: Karate
- Weight class: 67 kg
- Event: Kumite
Medal record
Men's karate
Representing Montenegro
European Games
Silver medal – second place	2019 Minsk	Kumite 67 kg
European Championships
Silver medal – second place	2019 Guadalajara	Kumite 67 kg
Silver medal – second place	2021 Poreč	Team kumite
Bronze medal – third place	2017 İzmit	Kumite 67 kg

Mario Hodžić is a Montenegrin karateka. He won the silver medal in the men's kumite 67 kg event at the 2019 European Games held in Minsk, Belarus.

In the same year, he also won the silver medal in the men's kumite 67 kg event at the 2019 European Karate Championships held in Guadalajara, Spain.

In 2021, he competed at the World Olympic Qualification Tournament held in Paris, France hoping to qualify for the 2020 Summer Olympics in Tokyo, Japan.

== Achievements ==
Year	Competition	Venue	Rank	Event
2017	European Championships	İzmit, Turkey	3rd	Kumite 67 kg
2019	European Championships	Guadalajara, Spain	2nd	Kumite 67 kg
2019	European Games	Minsk, Belarus	2nd	Kumite 67 kg
2021	European Championships	Poreč, Croatia	2nd	Team kumite
