= 2019 European Games =

Second edition of the European Games

2nd European Games
- Host city: Minsk, Belarus
- Motto: Bright Year, Bright You!: Russian: Время ярких побед!; Belarusian: Час яскравых перамог!; translation: Time for bright victories!
- Nations: 50
- Athletes: 4,082
- Events: 200 in 15 sports
- Opening: 21 June 2019
- Closing: 30 June 2019
- Opened by: President Alexander Lukashenko
- Athlete's Oath: Vasilisa Marzaliuk
- Judge's Oath: Artur Fando
- Torch lighter: Darya Domracheva, Alexei Grishin, Max Mirnyi, Yulia Nestsiarenka, Roman Petrushenko, Nadezhda Skardino and Dmitri Dovgalenok
- Main venue: National Olympic Stadium Dinamo
- Website: 2019 European Games

The 2nd European Games 2019 (Belarusian: II Еўрапейскія гульні, Jeŭrapiejskija huĺni 2019; Russian: II Европейские игры, Yevropeyskiye igry 2019), also known as the 2019 European Games or Minsk 2019 (Belarusian: Мінск 2019; Russian: Минск 2019), were held in Minsk, Belarus, from 21 June to 30 June 2019. The games featured 200 events in 15 sports (23 disciplines). Around 4,000 athletes from 50 countries participated. Ten of the sports offered qualification opportunities for the 2020 Summer Olympics in Tokyo, Japan. The opening ceremony at the Dinamo Stadium was held on 21 June, and the closing ceremony at the same venue was held on 30 June.

== Host selection ==
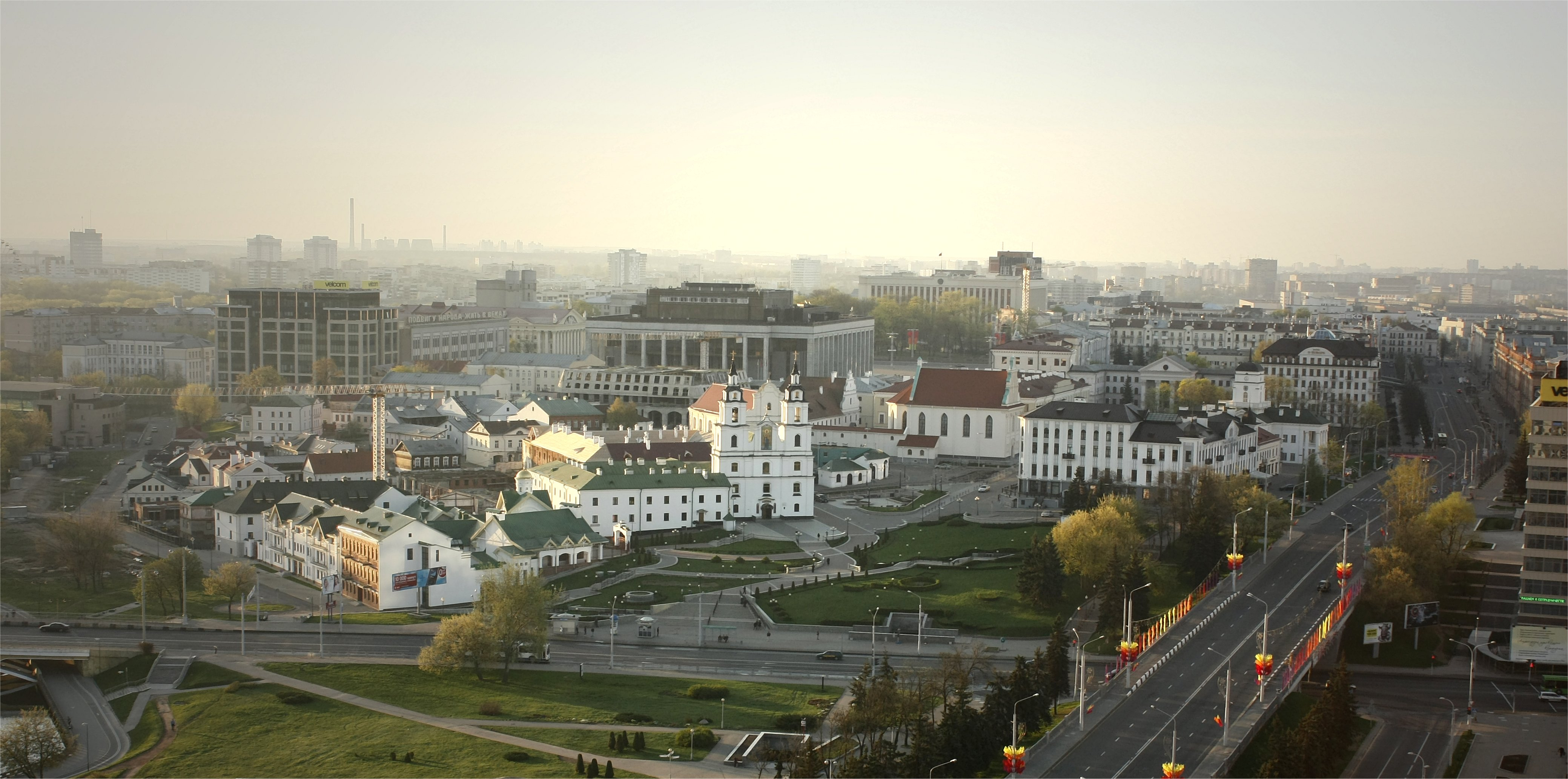
Minsk was selected as the host city of the 2019 European Games

A number of countries and cities expressed their interest to host the second European Games in 2019 but only the Netherlands submitted an official bid. At the meeting of an Extraordinary General Assembly on 16 May 2015, the Netherlands was unanimously approved as host of the second edition of the Games. The competition intended to be nationwide and based in seven cities, including Amsterdam, The Hague, Eindhoven, Rotterdam, Utrecht. On 10 June 2015, the Netherlands announced their refusal to hold the second European Games after insufficient funding for the Games, projected to cost €57.5m. The European Olympic Committee president, Patrick Hickey said the news was "disappointing". Following this, a number of countries expressed interest in hosting the games: Belarus (Minsk), United Kingdom (Glasgow), Poland (Poznań), Russia (Kazan and Sochi), Turkey (Istanbul).

In November 2015, Russia was announced as a future host country for the II European Games. At the same time, the WADA began its investigation of the doping scandal in Russia which led to the IOC's refusal to support the holding of major sports events in Russia, including the second European Games.

During the meeting of the EOC General Assembly, held in Minsk on 21 October 2016, Minsk was selected as a host city for the second European Games. A contract was signed on 1 September 2017 by the chairman of the Minsk City Executive Committee Andrei Shorets, the president of the EOC Janez Kocijančič, the Minister of Sport and Tourism of Belarus Alexander Shamko, first Vice-President of the NOC of Belarus Andrey Astashevich, Director of the 2nd European Games 2019 Georgy Katulin, Secretary-General of the European Olympic Committees Rafael Pagnozzi.

== Development and preparations ==
=== Organising committee ===
On 12 May 2017, the President of Belarus Alexander Lukashenko signed a decree on the Foundation of the Directorate of the II European Games 2019. The founders of the foundation are the National Olympic Committee, the Minsk City Executive Committee and the Ministry of Sports and Tourism. Georgy Katulin, General Secretary of the National Olympic Committee of the Republic of Belarus, was appointed the CEO of the foundation in August 2017. In November 2017, the management launched the official website of the games.

In April 2019, Lukashenko announced that the Games were on budget and on time and that "everything should meet the highest standards". Sergei Rumas, Belarus's prime minister and the head of the organising committee also said that all the facilities would be finished by 15 May and that "95 per cent of the equipment has already been installed".

On 20 May 2019, Lukashenko signed Decree No.191, entitled "On security measures during the 2nd European Games in Belarus". It gave the Ministry of Defence the power to restrict access to certain areas and placed a ban on drones, unmanned aerial vehicles and model aeroplanes at competition venues. Drones and planes violating the decree will be seized until 2 July, when the Games end.

=== Volunteers ===
The start of the volunteer selection began in September 2017 during the "Dobrofest" and registration ended on 1 April 2019. In April 2019, the head of the volunteer network for the Games, Nadezhda Anisovets, said that the appeal resulted in 24,000 applications, much larger than the 8,000 needed for the Games. Most of them are students of Belarusian universities. Applications were also received from 52 other countries including Russia, Australia, the USA, Mexico, and Egypt. The basic requirements for the candidate are communication skills and high English-language proficiency. The selected volunteers will be involved in over 34 functional areas. Each volunteer will be given a special uniform, badges and souvenirs.

On June 30, 2019, Tony Moore performed his composition “We Are The Light” at the closing ceremony of the European Games 2019 in Belarus. The song was written to honour the 8000 volunteers who helped host the Euro Games in Minsk 2019.

=== Transportation ===
On 27 December 2017, it was announced about the finalising of the development of a comprehensive transport service plan for the competition, based on the needs of all stakeholders and the experience of the previous Olympic and European Games host cities: Beijing, London, Baku. The main goal of the developed plan is to optimise the routes in such a way that any participant can get to any stadium in no more than half an hour. Rail services between Masyukovshchina (Minsk-Arena), Belarus (regatta course Zaslawye) and Loshitsa (Čyžoŭka-Arena) will operate with higher frequency during the event. In addition, the existing bus network will be expanded by 10 to 12 new routes to the competition sites, which will run up to 300 buses and trolleybuses.

In August 2018, new digital information boards were unveiled in order to improve the public transport network for foreign visitors. Valery Shkuratov, the director of Metropolitan Transport and Communications (the firm which manage the transit systems in the city), said that more than 270 displays had already been installed.

In October 2018, it was announced that the Minsk metro would have full 4G coverage by the time the Games began. The next month, fourteen taxi companies in Minsk as well as several governmental and administrational departments signed a memorandum of understanding to guarantee fair prices during the Games. In March 2019, it was announced that the taxis adhering to the scheme would carry a logo to enable customers to identify them.

=== Venues ===
Dinamo Stadium

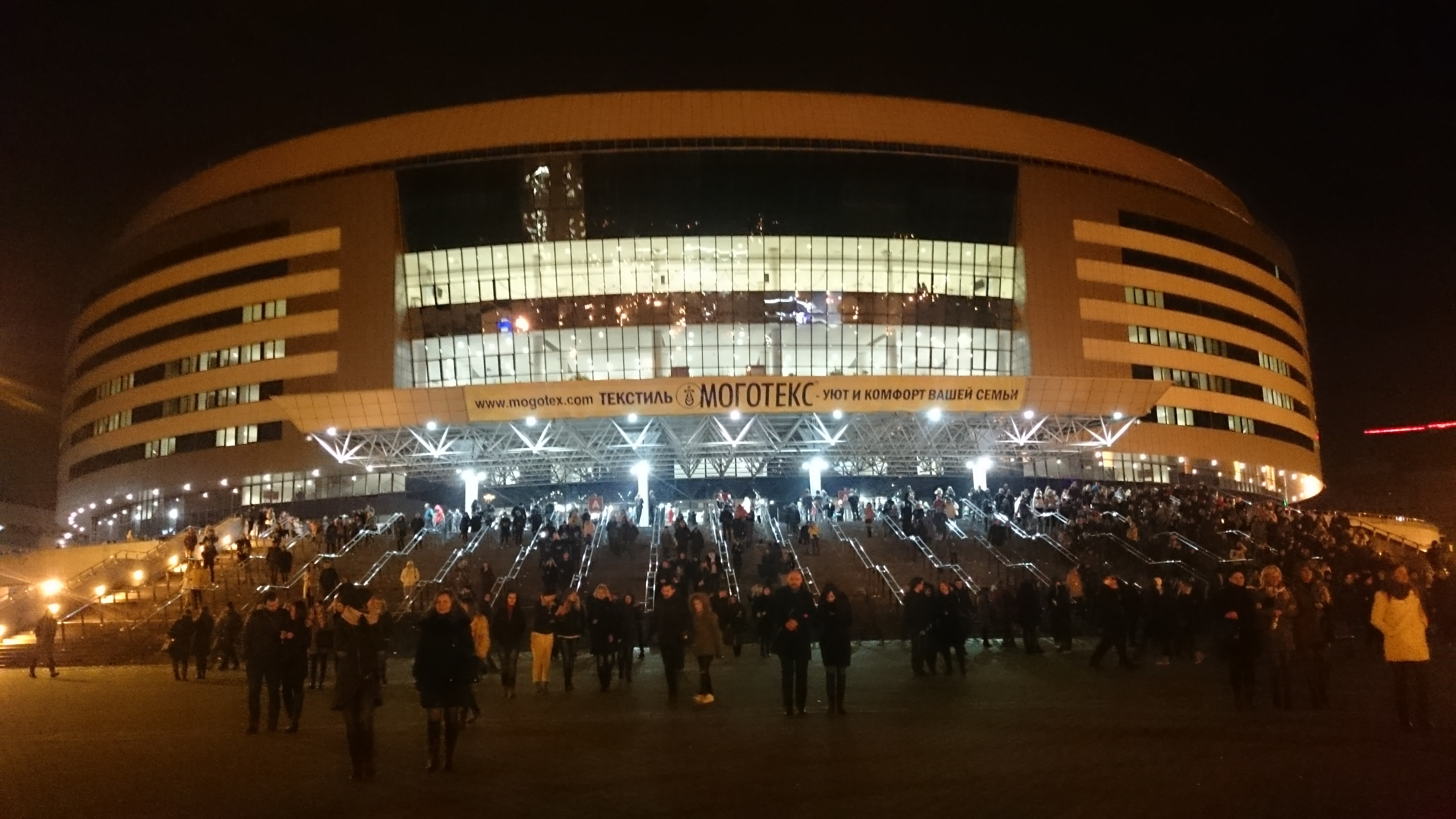
Minsk Arena

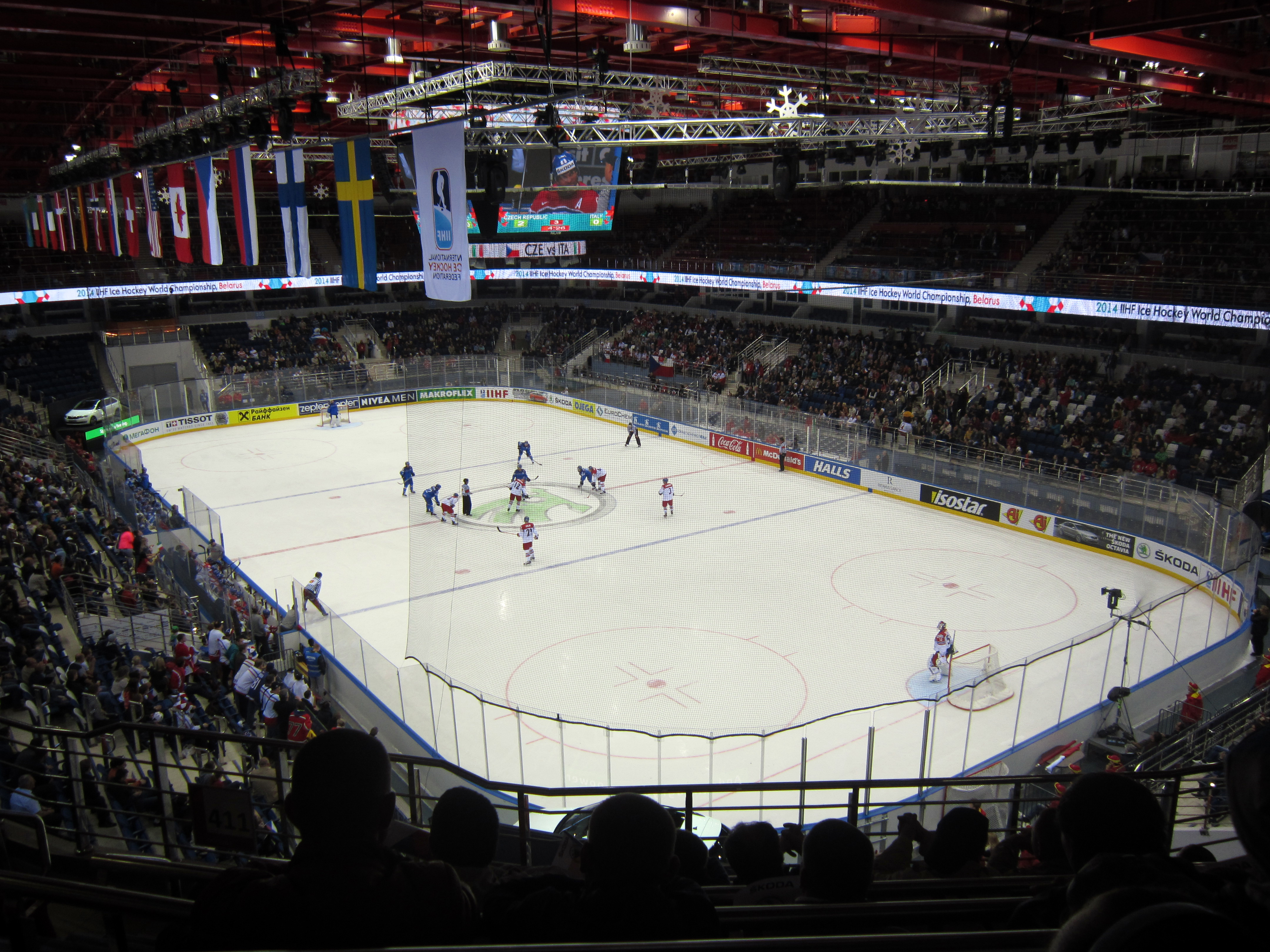
Čyžoŭka-Arena

The Organising committee plans to involve already existed sports facilities after their renovation. The opening and closing ceremonies, as well as competitions in track and field, will be held at the Dinamo Stadium (Minsk, Kirov, 8).

Athletes, team officials and other team personnel will stay on the grounds of Minsk University, which has the capacity to host up to 7,500 people. The students have been evicted for the duration of the Games and given alternative accommodation. Part of the village facilities has already been put into operation, part of it will be completed by April 2019. Each apartment has two bedrooms and can hold up to 4 people. The village also has a canteen, gym, merchandise store and cultural centre.

Key to colours
E	Existing
N	New
R	Renovated

Venue	Sports	Capacity	
Dinamo Stadium	Ceremonies, athletics	22,000	R
Olympic Sports Complex (Minsk)	Archery, beach soccer	1,500	N
Palova Arena	Basketball 3×3	1,000	E
Uruchie Sports Palace	Boxing	3,000	E
Minsk Sports Palace	Sambo, wrestling	3,300	E
Minsk-Arena	Gymnastics	8,000	E
Minsk Arena Velodrome	Cycling track	2,000	E
Čyžoŭka-Arena	Judo, karate	8,800	E
Sporting Club	Shooting	300	E
Shooting Centre	Shooting	250	E
Tennis Olympic Center	Table tennis	1,000	E
Zaslawye Regatta Course	Canoe sprint	1,500	E
Falcon Club	Badminton	2,000	E
Minsk City Centre	Cycling road	N/A	E

=== Torch relay ===
The torch relay "Flame of Peace" was planned for before the games. In addition to traditional running with a torch, there were also creative performances organised along the route. The torch relay will last for 50 days and will cover 7,700 km. The relay will include 450 torchbearers, 100 volunteers and 10 flame keepers. The torch relay will begin on 3 May in Rome.

The torch itself was designed by Yulia Braychuk, weighs 1.7 kg and is 81 cm tall. It is made from stainless steel and can be attached to a bike or wheelchair.

==== Route ====
- 3 May (day 1)
  Rome
- 4 May (day 2)
  Courmayeur
- 5-7 May
  Mont Blanc (5-7 May)
  Courmayeur (Return after descent on 7 May)
- 8 May (day 3)
  Ljubljana
- 9 May (day 4)
  Vienna
  Budapest
- 10 May (day 5)
  Bratislava
  Brno
- 11 May (day 6)
  Warsaw
- 12 May (day 7)
  Brest
- 13 May (day 8)
  Skoki
- 14 May (day 9)
  Kamyanyets
  Belovezhskaya Pushcha National Park
- 15 May (day 10)
  Pinsk
- 16 May (day 11)
  Kudrichi
  Mikashevichy
- 17 May (day 12)
  Baranavichy
  Kosava
- 18 May (day 13)
  Grodno
- 19 May (day 14)
  Augustów Canal
- 20 May (day 15)
  Vawkavysk
- 21 May (day 16)
  Mir
  Navahrudak
- 22 May (day 17)
  Byarozawka
  Lida
- 23 May (day 18)
  Oginski Family Estate and Museum
  Astravyets
  Gervyaty
- 24 May (day 19)
  Vitebsk
- 25 May (day 20)
  Polatsk
  Navapolatsk
- 26 May (day 21)
  Yelnya
  Braslaw
- 27 May (day 22)
  Mosar
  Hlybokaye
- 28 May (day 23)
  Lepel
- 29 May (day 24)
  Orsha
- 30 May (day 25)
  Mogilev
- 31 May (day 26)
  Shkloŭ
  Aleksandryia
- 1 June (day 27)
  Horki
- 2 June (day 28)
  Slawharad
  Bychaŭ
  Chigirinsky reservoir
- 3-4 June (day 29, 30)
  Babruysk
- 5-6 June (day 31, 32)
  Gomel
- 7 June (day 33)
  Žlobin
  Krasnyy Bereg
- 8 June (day 34)
  Pripyatsky National Park
- 9 June (day 35)
  Turaŭ
- 10 June (day 36)
  Mazyr
- 11 June (day 37)
  Salihorsk
- 12 June (day 38)
  Niasviž
  Mound of Glory
- 13 June (day 39)
  Barysaw
  Zhodzina
- 14 June (day 40)
  Lahoysk
  Khatyn Memorial
- 15 June (day 41)
  Maladzyechna
- 16 June (day 42)
  Stalin Line
  Zasłaŭje
- 17-20 June (day 43, 44, 45, 46, 47)
  Minsk
- 21 June (day 48)
  Olympic Stadium

== Participating National Olympic Committees ==
All fifty European Olympic Committees member countries competed at the Games. Numbers in brackets denote the number of athletes being sent to the Games.

- Albania (13)
- Andorra (12)
- Armenia (40)
- Austria (59)
- Azerbaijan (83)
- Belarus (233) (host)
- Belgium (51)
- Bosnia and Herzegovina (17)
- Bulgaria (87)
- Croatia (45)
- Cyprus (41)
- Czech Republic (124)
- Denmark (62)
- Estonia (68)
- Finland (37)
- France (185)
- Georgia (61)
- Germany (162)
- Great Britain (101)
- Greece (61)
- Hungary (125)
- Iceland (7)
- Ireland (65)
- Israel (33)
- Italy (161)
- Kosovo (12)
- Latvia (52)
- Liechtenstein (1)
- Lithuania (73)
- Luxembourg (24)
- Malta (4)
- Moldova (50)
- Monaco (5)
- Montenegro (9)
- Netherlands (87)
- North Macedonia (9)
- Norway (39)
- Poland (151)
- Portugal (99)
- Romania (124)
- Russia (218)
- San Marino (5)
- Serbia (66)
- Slovakia (74)
- Slovenia (72)
- Spain (150)
- Sweden (51)
- Switzerland (78)
- Turkey (110)
- Ukraine (197)

IOC Code	Country	Running Order	Athletes
BLR	30	Belarus	233
RUS	13	Russia	218
UKR	15	Ukraine	197
FRA	43	France	185
GER	3	Germany	162
ITA	31	Italy	161
POL	10	Poland	151
ESP	35	Spain	150
HUN	38	Hungary	125
ROU	37	Romania	124
CZE	5	Czech Republic	124
TUR	34	Turkey	110
GBR	49	Great Britain	101
POR	26	Portugal	99
NED	45	Netherlands	87
BUL	32	Bulgaria	87
AZE	27	Azerbaijan	83
SUI	41	Switzerland	77
SVK	18	Slovakia	74
LTU	36	Lithuania	73
SLO	6	Slovenia	72
EST	7	Estonia	68
IRL	25	Ireland	66
SRB	40	Serbia	65
DEN	4	Denmark	62
GEO	47	Georgia	61
GRE	22	Greece	61
AUT	20	Austria	59
LAT	12	Latvia	52
SWE	48	Sweden	51
BEL	14	Belgium	51
MDA	9	Moldova	50
CRO	33	Croatia	45
CYP	44	Cyprus	41
ARM	28	Armenia	40
NOR	24	Norway	39
FIN	19	Finland	37
ISR	21	Israel	33
LUX	16	Luxembourg	24
BIH	29	Bosnia and Herzegovina	17
ALB	8	Albania	13
AND	11	Andorra	12
KOS	46	Kosovo	12
MNE	17	Montenegro	9
MKD	42	North Macedonia	9
ISL	23	Iceland	7
MON	39	Monaco	5
SMR	50	San Marino	5
MLT	1	Malta	4
LIE	2	Liechtenstein	1
Total		4,082	

== The Games ==
=== Opening ceremony ===
The opening ceremony was held at National Olympic Stadium Dinamo and ran from 22:10 to 00:45 FET. It was produced by Russian company Art City 5, and was directed by Alexander Vavilov (Belarus) and Alexei Sechenov (Russia). Augmented reality imagery was used during the ceremony. The main musical performers were Anna Netrebko, Ilya Silchukov with Elena Salo and Dimash Kudaibergen. During the parade of nations, Greece entered the stadium first. The host nation Belarus marched last, while other countries entered in English alphabetical order. Each delegation is escorted by girls in dresses representing the Kupala wheel, a symbol of the sun for Eastern Slavs decorated with traditional Belarusian ornaments. Attending the ceremony was President Alexander Lukashenko, who opened the games, Janez Kocijančič of the European Olympic Committee, as well as other foreign delegations such as Igor Dodon representing Moldova, Aleksandar Vučić representing Serbia as well as Dmitry Medvedev and Ramzan Kadyrov representing Russia. Georgian President Salome Zourabichvili, who was due to attend the ceremony, left early due to the civil unrest in the Georgian capital of Tbilisi.

=== Sports ===
A total of 15 sports were presented: archery, athletics, badminton, 3x3 basketball, beach football, boxing, canoe sprint, cycling, gymnastics, judo, karate, sambo, shooting, table tennis and wrestling. A number of disciplines were dropped after the 2015 European Games: all aquatics (diving, swimming, synchronised swimming and water polo), BMX racing, mountain biking, fencing, taekwondo, triathlon and all volleyball (beach volleyball and indoor volleyball). Ten of the sports offered qualification opportunities for the 2020 Summer Olympics in Tokyo, Japan.

- Archery (8)
- Athletics (10)
- Badminton (5)
- Basketball (3x3) (2)
- Beach soccer (1)
- Boxing (15)
- Canoe sprint (16)
- Cycling
  - Road cycling (4)
  - Track cycling (20)
- Gymnastics
  - Acrobatic (6)
  - Aerobic (2)
  - Artistic (12)
  - Trampoline (4)
  - Rhythmic (8)
- Judo (15)
- Karate (12)
- Sambo (18)
- Shooting (19)
- Table tennis (5)
- Wrestling (18)
  - Freestyle
  - Greco-Roman
  - Women

=== Calendar ===
The competition schedule consists of 200 events.

OC	Opening ceremony	●	Event competitions	1	Event finals	CC	Closing ceremony

June		21st Fri	22nd Sat	23rd Sun	24th Mon	25th Tue	26th Wed	27th Thu	28th Fri	29th Sat	30th Sun	Medal Events
Ceremonies		OC									CC	
Archery		●	2	2	●	●	2	2				8
Athletics				9		●	●		1			10
Badminton					●	●	●	●	●	2	3	5
Basketball (3x3)		●	●	●	2							2
Beach soccer						●	●	●	●	1		1
Boxing		●	●	●	●	●	●		●	7	8	15
Canoe sprint						●	5	11				16
Cycling
Cycling	Road cycling		1	1		2						4
Cycling	Track cycling							4	5	5	6	20
Gymnastics
Gymnastics	Acrobatic		4	2								6
Gymnastics	Aerobic				1	1						2
Gymnastics	Artistic							●		2	10	12
Gymnastics	Rhythmic		1	7								8
Gymnastics	Trampoline				2	2						4
Judo			5	4	5	1						15
Karate										6	6	12
Sambo			9	9								18
Shooting
Shooting	Rifle and Pistol		2	2	3	1	3	1	1			13
Shooting	Shotgun		●	2	1		●	2	1			6
Table tennis			●	●	●	1	2	●	●	2		5
Wrestling
Wrestling	Freestyle					●	4	2				6
Wrestling	Women					●	●	2	4			6
Wrestling	Greco-Roman								●	3	3	6
Total		0	24	38	14	8	16	24	12	28	36	200
June		21st Fri	22nd Sat	23rd Sun	24th Mon	25th Tue	26th Wed	27th Thu	28th Fri	29th Sat	30th Sun	Medal Events

=== Closing ceremony ===
The closing ceremony was held at National Olympic Stadium Dinamo and ran from 22:00 to 23:50 FET. In attendance were IOC president Thomas Bach, Russian President Vladimir Putin, Tajik President Emomali Rahmon, and Armenian President Armen Sarkissian.

== Medal table ==
* Host nation (Belarus)

2019 European Games medal table
Rank	NOC	Gold	Silver	Bronze	Total
1	Russia (RUS)	44	24	41	109
2	Belarus (BLR)*	23	16	29	68
3	Ukraine (UKR)	16	17	19	52
4	Italy (ITA)	13	15	13	41
5	Netherlands (NED)	9	13	7	29
6	Georgia (GEO)	7	9	14	30
7	Germany (GER)	7	6	13	26
8	France (FRA)	6	9	13	28
9	Great Britain (GBR)	6	9	8	23
10	Azerbaijan (AZE)	5	10	13	28
11–43	Remaining	64	72	113	249
Totals (43 entries)		200	200	283	683

== Marketing ==
=== Logo ===
The prototype for creating the 2nd European Games' logo in Minsk was the Kupala fire and "paparats-kvetka", which plays an important role in . The logo of the Games was "paparać-kvietka" (Belarusian: папараць-кветка, romanized: paparats-kvyetka)—a plant that plays an important role in the culture of the Slavic culture. According to legend, the mythical flower blossoms once a year at midnight on Kupala Night. Anyone who sees this flowering will become the owner of unusual abilities and talents. The slogan of the event is "Bright Year, Bright You", which also makes reference to the national domain of the Republic of Belarus and the official international shortening—BY.

=== Mascot ===
Lesik, the mascot of the games.

In autumn of 2017, an open republican contest for the development of the mascot of the European Games was announced. Anyone could take part in the competition. Over 2,000 variants were collected from professionals and amateurs. The public presentation of the winning version took place in Minsk on 29 November 2018. The mascot chosen was a baby fox named "Lesik" who wears a shirt and shorts with the colours of the games' logo and wears shoes and a baseball hat with the games' slogan.

Lesik's story is based after The Little Prince, when after the Little Prince leaves Earth, Lesik the Fox misses his new friend and wants to make more. He learns of a legendary flower called the Paparats Kvetka which can help his dream come true, but he needs to travel 1 million steps to Belarus to find it. He represents friendship, development, harmony, discipline, determination, cheerfulness, invincibility and vigour, according to the mascot's creators.

=== Slogan ===
The slogan of the event is "Bright Year, Bright You!", which also successfully points to the national domain of the Republic of Belarus and the official international abbreviation BY. The Belarusian equivalent of the slogan is the phrase "Час яскравых перамог!", and the Russian is "Время ярких побед!", literally "Time for bright victories!"

=== Corporate sponsorship ===
Sponsorship was approved as one of the sources to reduce the number of budgetary funds for the games according to the decree of the president of the Republic of Belarus of 12 May 2017 «On the Directorate of the second European Games 2019». On 15 December 2017, the official sponsor of the games became the operator of electronic interactive games «Sport Pari». On 22 December 2017, it was announced that the telecommunication operator velcom is the official telecommunication partner of the 2nd European Games of 2019. In March 2019, the Games' Organising Committee signed a memorandum of understanding with UNAIDS to strengthen co-operation in promoting safe lifestyles, preventing the spread of HIV/AIDS and eliminating discrimination around the infection.

Sponsors of the 2019 European Games
Premium Partners
- Belaruskali
National Partners
- Autoidea (BMW)
- Belarusbank
- Belshina
- Beltelecom (Yasna)
- Fabrika Reklamy
- Joint United Nations Programme on HIV/AIDS
- Krinitsa
- Luch
- Minsk Tractor Works
- MTS
- UNICEF
Official Suppliers
- Belgosstrakh
- Business Network
- Eurotorg
- Lidkon
- Mogilevliftmash
- Priorbank
- Slodych
- Sportpari
- Stepanovski, Papakul and Partners
- Teleport VR
- Toptyshka
- velcom
Supporters
- AGAT Control Systems
- Barista
- Belarusian National Reinsurance Organization
- CITIC Construction
- Coca-Cola
- Dalai
- Eximgarant of Belarus
- Indigo
- life:)
- Minskaya–4
- Nivea
- Promargoleasing
- Soft Club
- Streamline
- Yangee

=== Star Ambassadors ===
- Darya Domracheva
- Aliaksandr Bahdanovich
- Aleksandr Medved
- Volha Mazuronak
- Rostislav Krimer
- Alexandr Romankov
- Ruslan Alekhno
- Maria Vasilevich
- Askold Zapashny
- Edgard Zapashny
- Tunzala Agayeva
- Ani Lorak
- Alexei Yagudin
- Nellie Kim

== Promotion ==
=== Selfie contest ===
The deadline for submitting the selfie photos was October 2018. The criteria for evaluating photos include compliance with the theme and conditions of the contest, as well as artistic taste and originality. The final results were to be announced in late December 2018; however, the competition was extended to the 31 December. It was then later announced that the deadline would be extended again to the 25 February 2019.

The winners were awarded diplomas from Belteleradiocompany, as well as sets of tickets for the events of the European Games in Minsk and the official gear of the National Team of the Republic of Belarus. It happened on 21 June, nearly 30 minutes prior to opening ceremony of the Games.

=== Stamps ===
On 1 February 2019, Belposhta, the Belarusian postal service, released the official stamps for the Games. The four designs depict a cyclist, a runner, a rower and a dancer and were designed by Marina Vitkovskaya, with 120,000 sets being printed. There was an official cancellation ceremony in Minsk City Hall on the day of release.

== Broadcasting rights ==
In February 2019, International Sports Broadcasting, a Spanish firm, was chosen as the host broadcaster for the Games, beating Match TV and Medialuso-Mediapro. The company had previously broadcast the 1st European Games in Baku. In March 2019, ISB was allowed to sell global broadcasting rights for the Games, with around 117 countries that have already been granted viewing rights. ISB and the Games' organisers have expressed that they hope to broadcast to more than 160 countries.

Europe

- Albania – Tring Media
- Azerbaijan – AzTV
- Belarus - BTRC
- Czech Republic – ČT sport
- Denmark – DR
- Spain – Teledeporte
- France – La chaine L'Équipe
- United Kingdom – BT Sport
- Georgia – 1TV, 2TV
- Germany, Austria, Switzerland and Luxembourg – Sport1
- Greece – ERT
- Hungary – MTVA
- Italy – Sky Sport
- Kosovo – RTK
- Poland – Polsat
- Portugal – Sport TV
- Romania – TVR
- Russia – Match TV
- Slovenia – RTV Slo 2
- Slovakia – STV 2
- Turkey – Sportstv
- Ukraine – Inter Media Group

Asia-Pacific and the Americas

- 46 countries in the region including United States, Australia, Japan, Philippines, South Korea and Brazil – Olympic Channel
- China – China Central Television
