= Chizhovka-Arena =

Sports venue in Minsk, Belarus

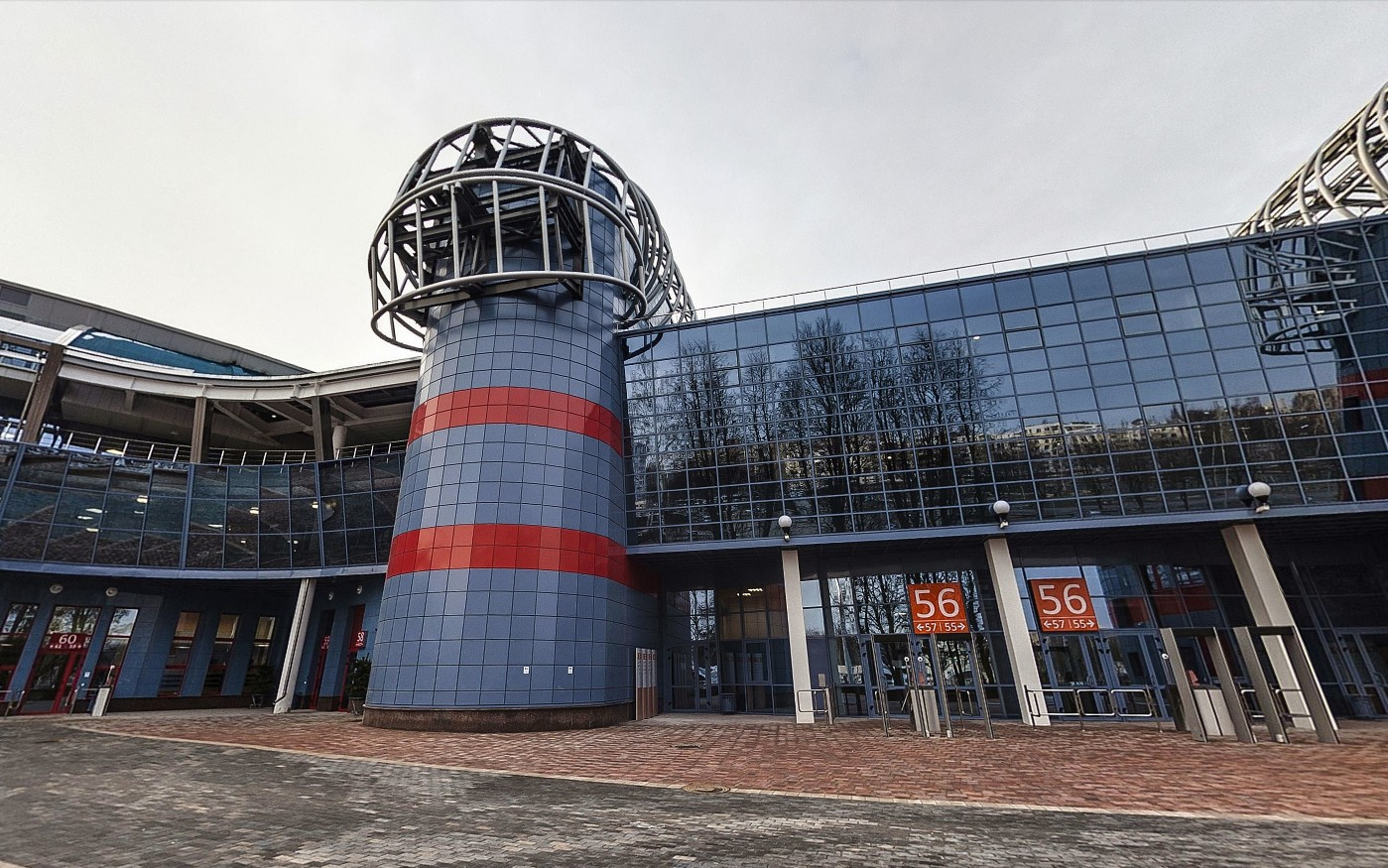
- Chizhovka-Arena in December 2013
- Interactive map of Chizhovka-Arena
- Location: Čyžoŭka, Minsk, Belarus
- Coordinates: 53.845°N 27.629027°E
- Capacity: 8,807 (hockey)

Construction
- Groundbreaking: July 2009
- Opened: December 25, 2013
- Cost: Rbls 450 million €195 million
- Architect: Marat Grodnikov

Tenant
- Yunost Minsk (2013–present)

Chizhovka-Arena (or Čyžoŭka-Arena, Belarusian: Чыжоўка-Арэна; Russian: Чижовка-Арена) is a multi-purpose indoor arena in Čyžoŭka microdistrict of Minsk, Belarus. Its full name is "Шматфункцыянальны культурна-спартыўны і забаўляльны комплекс «Чыжоўка-Арэна»". Opened in December 2013, it is mostly used for concerts, ice hockey and other indoor sporting activities. The main arena has a capacity of 8,807 people and the training arena has 473 seats. The project of Chizhovka-Arena was changed several times. The final project was approved in 2010.

== Events ==
It was listed as one of two main venues for the 2014 Men's World Ice Hockey Championships. The arena hosted the 2017 final of the ITF Fed Cup, a women's team tennis event.

== See also ==
- 2014 IIHF World Championships
- List of indoor arenas in Belarus
