= Ukraine at the 2019 European Games =

- IOC code: UKR
- NOC: National Olympic Committee of Ukraine
- Website: www.noc-ukr.org

in Minsk, Belarus 21 – 30 June 2019
- Competitors: 204 in 15 sports
- Medals Ranked 3rd: Gold 16 Silver 17 Bronze 19 Total 52

European Games appearances (overview)
- 2015; 2019; 2023; 2027

Ukraine competed at the 2019 European Games, in Minsk, Belarus from 21 to 30 June 2019 and won 52 medals, including 16 golds. Ukrainian athletes competed in all 15 sports included in the programm. Ukraine's team was third biggest team at the Games. Ukraine has previously competed at the 2015 European Games in Baku, Azerbaijan, where it won 46 medals, including eight golds.

== Medalists ==
Medal	Name	Sport	Event	Date
Gold	Georgii Zantaraia	Judo	Men's 66 kg	22 June
Gold	Daria Bilodid	Judo	Women's 48 kg	22 June
Gold	Anastasiia Sapsai	Sambo	Women's +80 kg	22 June
Gold	Anna Ryzhykova; Stanislav Senyk; Tetyana Melnyk; Danylo Danylenko	Athletics	Mixed 4 × 400 m relay	23 June
Gold	Yevhen Hutsol; Olha Lyakhova; Oleksiy Pozdnyakov; Yana Kachur	Athletics	Mixed medley relay	23 June
Gold	Mariya Povkh; Liudmyla Kuklinovska	Canoe sprint	Women's K-2 200 m	27 June
Gold	Hanna Solovey	Cycling	Women's points race	27 June
Gold	Ukraine athletics' national team: Maryna Bekh-Romanchuk; Bohdan Bondarenko; Bohdan Chornomaz; Danylo Danylenko; Hanna Hatsko-Fedusova; Yevhen Hutsol; Yana Kachur; Alina Lohvynenko; Olha Lyakhova; Tetyana Melnyk; Oleh Myronets; Hanna Plotitsyna; Oleksiy Pozdnyakov; Nataliya Pryshchepa; Andriy Protsenko; Anna Ryzhykova; Stanislav Senyk; Artem Shamatrin; Serhiy Smelyk; Hrystyna Stuy; Krystyna Hryshutyna	Athletics	Team event	28 June
Gold	Yuliya Tkach	Wrestling	Women's freestyle 62 kg	28 June
Gold	Victor Vykhryst	Boxing	Men's +91 kg	29 June
Gold	Oleksandr Khyzhniak	Boxing	Men's 75 kg	30 June
Gold	Oleg Verniaiev	Artistic gymnastics	Men's parallel bars	30 June
Gold	Anastasia Bachynska	Artistic gymnastics	Women's floor exercise	30 June
Gold	Stanislav Horuna	Karate	Men's kumite 75 kg	30 June
Gold	Anita Serogina	Karate	Women's kumite 61 kg	30 June
Gold	Zhan Beleniuk	Wrestling	Men's Greco-Roman 87 kg	30 June
Silver	Anastasiia Novikova	Sambo	Women's 48 kg	22 June
Silver	Olena Sayko	Sambo	Women's 64 kg	22 June
Silver	Hanna Plotitsyna	Athletics	Women's 100 m hurdles	23 June
Silver	Alina Bykhno; Tetiana Dovzhenko; Diana Myzherytska; Anastasiya Voznyak; Valeriya Yuzviak	Rhythmic gymnastics	3 hoops and 4 clubs	23 June
Silver	Kateryna Moskalova	Sambo	Women's 68 kg	23 June
Silver	Oleh Omelchuk	Shooting	Men's 10 metre air pistol	23 June
Silver	Anton Davydenko; Mykola Prostorov	Trampoline	Men's synchronized trampoline	24 June
Silver	Maryna Kyiko; Svitlana Malkova	Trampoline	Women's synchronized trampoline	25 June
Silver	Andrii Rybachok; Yurii Vandiuk	Canoe sprint	Men's C-2 1000 m	26 June
Silver	Oleh Kukharyk; Oleksandr Syromiatnykov	Canoe sprint	Men's K-2 1000 m	26 June
Silver	Yuliya Khalvadzhy	Wrestling	Women's freestyle 53 kg	27 June
Silver	Oksana Livach	Wrestling	Women's freestyle 50 kg	28 June
Silver	Oleg Verniaiev	Artistic gymnastics	Men's all-around	29 June
Silver	Mykola Butsenko	Boxing	Men's 56 kg	30 June
Silver	Olena Starikova	Cycling	Women's 500 m time trial	30 June
Silver	Oleg Verniaiev	Artistic gymnastics	Men's pommel horse	30 June
Silver	Anzhelika Terliuga	Karate	Women's kumite 55 kg	30 June
Bronze	Nataliya Smal	Sambo	Women's 72 kg	22 June
Bronze	Bohdan Bondarenko	Athletics	Men's high jump	23 June
Bronze	Maryna Bekh-Romanchuk	Athletics	Women's long jump	23 June
Bronze	Vlada Nikolchenko	Rhythmic gymnastics	Hoop	23 June
Bronze	Vlada Nikolchenko	Rhythmic gymnastics	Clubs	23 June
Bronze	Halyna Kovalska	Sambo	Women's 80 kg	23 June
Bronze	Oleksandr Khotsianivskyi	Wrestling	Men's freestyle 125 kg	26 June
Bronze	Hor Ohannesian	Wrestling	Men's freestyle 65 kg	27 June
Bronze	Alla Cherkasova	Wrestling	Women's freestyle 68 kg	27 June
Bronze	Yevhenii Barabanov	Boxing	Men's 69 kg	28 June
Bronze	Olena Kostevych; Pavlo Korostylov	Shooting	Mixed team 25 metre standard pistol	28 June
Bronze	Diana Varinska	Artistic gymnastics	Women's all-around	29 June
Bronze	Valerii Chobotar	Karate	Men's kumite 84 kg	29 June
Bronze	Halyna Melnyk	Karate	Women's kumite 68 kg	29 June
Bronze	Petro Pakhnyuk	Artistic gymnastics	Men's floor exercise	30 June
Bronze	Ihor Radivilov	Artistic gymnastics	Men's rings	30 June
Bronze	Ihor Radivilov	Artistic gymnastics	Men's vault	30 June
Bronze	Diana Varinska	Artistic gymnastics	Women's balance beam	30 June
Bronze	Mykola Kuchmii	Wrestling	Men's Greco-Roman 130 kg	30 June

== Competitors ==
Ukraine was represented by 199 athletes in 15 sports.

Sport	Men	Women	Total
Archery	1	3	4
Athletics	11	11	22
Badminton	4	3	7
Basketball	4	4	8
Beach soccer	12	—	12
Boxing	10	3	13
Canoe sprint	7	10	17
Cycling	13	9	22
Gymnastics	6	15	21
Judo	9	7	16
Karate	2	4	6
Sambo	6	9	15
Shooting	7	7	14
Table tennis	2	3	5
Wrestling	11	6	17
Total	104	95	199

== Tables legend ==
Key

- Note–Ranks given for track events are within the athlete's heat only
- Q = Qualified for the next round
- q = Qualified for the next round as a fastest loser or, in field events, by position without achieving the qualifying target
- NR = National record
- N/A = Round not applicable for the event
- Bye = Athlete not required to compete in round

== Archery ==
These Games saw a worse performance of Ukrainian archers in comparison to the 2015 European Games when Ukraine had won three medals. Moreover, Ukraine did not manage to qualify a men's team and no one reached quarterfinals in individual competitions. As in 2015, Ukrainian women's team lost to Belarus (but in 2015 they met in semifinals). For Veronika Marchenko, Anastasia Pavlova and Lidiia Sichenikova, those were second European Games in their career. No Ukrainian athletes secured a spot in compound competitions which were held at the European Games for the first time.

Recurve

Athlete	Event	Ranking round		Round of 64	Round of 32	Round of 16	Quarterfinals	Semifinals	Final / BM	
Athlete	Event	Score	Seed	Opposition Score	Opposition Score	Opposition Score	Opposition Score	Opposition Score	Opposition Score	Rank
Yuriy Havelko	Men's individual	668	8	Bye	Sierakówski (POL); L 2–6	Did not advance				
Veronika Marchenko	Women's individual	635	18	Deineko (SUI); W 6–0	Mîrca (MDA); W 6–2	Degn (DEN); L 4–6	Did not advance			
Anastasia Pavlova	Women's individual	625	24	Destrooper (BEL); W *6–5	Bjerendal (SWE); W 6–0	Dziominskaya (BLR); L 0–6	Did not advance			
Lidiia Sichenikova	Women's individual	606	36	Reidy (IRL); L 5–6*	Did not advance					
Veronika Marchenko; Anastasia Pavlova; Lidiia Sichenikova	Women's team	1866	7	—			Belarus; L 3–5	Did not advance		
Yuriy Havelko; Veronika Marchenko	Mixed team	1303	10	—	Slovakia; W 6–0	Great Britain; L 3–5	Did not advance			

== Athletics ==
Ukraine did not compete in athletics at the previous games since it was combined then with the European Team Championships Third League competition and Ukraine was at that time in the Super League division. Ukrainian athletes won the overall Dynamic New Athletics competition, which was held for the first time, as well as several individual medals. Kristina Gryshutina (long jump) had been included by the NOC of Ukraine to the list of participants, though she did not compete at the Games.

Track events

Athlete	Event	Distance	Rank
Khrystyna Stuy	Women's 100 m	11.83	16
Serhiy Smelyk	Men's 100 m	10.55	7
Artem Shamatrin	Men's 110 m hurdles	14.21	11
Hanna Plotitsyna	Women's 100 m hurdles	13.14	2nd place, silver medalist(s)
Hanna Ryzhykova; Stanislav Senyk; Tetyana Melnyk; Danylo Danylenko	Mixed 4 × 400 m relay	3:17.31	1st place, gold medalist(s)
Yevhen Hutsol; Olha Lyakhova; Oleksiy Pozdnyakov; Yana Kachur	Mixed medley relay	4:25.02	1st place, gold medalist(s)

Field events

Athlete	Event	Distance	Rank
Bohdan Bondarenko	Men's high jump	2.21	3rd place, bronze medalist(s)
Maryna Bekh-Romanchuk	Women's long jump	6.58	3rd place, bronze medalist(s)
Hanna Hatsko-Fedusova	Women's javelin throw	58.46	8

Team event

Athlete	Event	Qualification				Quarterfinals				Semifinals				Final			
Athlete	Event	Result	Points	Total points	Rank	Result	Points	Total points	Rank	Result	Points	Total points	Rank	Result	Points	Total points	Rank
Serhiy Smelyk	Men's 100 m	10.55	8	76	1 QS	Bye				10.35	10	71	1 SF	10.44	12	74	1st place, gold medalist(s)
Maryna Bekh-Romanchuk	Women's long jump	6.58	12	76	1 QS	Bye				6.64	10	71	1 SF	6.79	12	74	1st place, gold medalist(s)
Khrystyna Stuy	Women's 100 m	11.83	4	76	1 QS	Bye				11.69	2	71	1 SF	11.79	8	74	1st place, gold medalist(s)
Hanna Hatsko-Fedusova	Women's javelin throw	55.61	10	76	1 QS	Bye				52.66	10	71	1 SF	53.25	6	74	1st place, gold medalist(s)
Hanna Ryzhykova (Q, F); Stanislav Senyk(Q); Tetyana Melnyk; Danylo Danylenko; Oleh Myronets (SF, F); Alina Lohvynenko (SF)	Mixed 4 × 400 m relay	3:17.31	12	76	1 QS	Bye				3:16.65	12	71	1 SF	3:19.28	10	74	1st place, gold medalist(s)
Artem Shamatrin (Q, F); Bohdan Chornomaz (SF)	Men's 110 m hurdles	14.21	8	76	1 QS	Bye				14.21	4	71	1 SF	14.05	8	74	1st place, gold medalist(s)
Bohdan Bondarenko (Q); Andriy Protsenko (SF, F)	Men's high jump	2.21	10	76	1 QS	Bye				2.11	11	71	1 SF	2.24	10	74	1st place, gold medalist(s)
Hanna Plotitsyna	Women's 100 m hurdles	13.14	12	76	1 QS	Bye				13.11	12	71	1 SF	13.14	8	74	1st place, gold medalist(s)
Yevhen Hutsol; Olha Lyakhova (SF, F); Oleksiy Pozdnyakov; Yana Kachur; Nataliya Pryshchepa (Q)	Mixed distance pursuit relay	4:25.02 (4:25.02)	—		1 QS	Bye				4:25.63 (4:25.63)	—		1 SF	4:27.14 (4:27.14)	—		1st place, gold medalist(s)

== Badminton ==
These Games saw a worse performance of Ukrainian badmintonists in comparison to the 2015 European Games since no one managed to qualify for the knock-out stage (Marija Ulitina in women's singles and Gennadiy Natarov/Yuliya Kazarinova in mixed doubles competed in the knock-out stage in 2015). Apart from Marija Ulitina, the following athletes competed for the second time in the European Games: Artem Pochtarov competed in 2015 in men's doubles, Yelyzaveta Zharka in women's doubles.

Athletes	Event	Group stage				Round of 16	Quarterfinals	Semifinals	Final	Rank
Athletes	Event	Opposition Score	Opposition Score	Opposition Score	Rank	Opposition Score	Opposition Score	Opposition Score	Opposition Score	Rank
Artem Pochtarov	Men's singles	Burestedt (SWE); L 0–2 (16–21, 17–21)	Penty (GBR); L 0–2 (21–23, 10–21)	Ludík (CZE); W 2–1 (21–15, 20–22, 21–11)	3	Did not advance				=17
Marija Ulitina	Women's singles	Kuuba (EST); L 1–2 (15–21, 21–15, 20–22)	Yiğit (TUR); L 0–2 (12–21, 15–21)	Zetchiri (BUL); L 1–2 (23–21, 17–21, 15–21)	4	Did not advance				=25
Glib Beketov; Mykhaylo Makhnovskiy	Men's doubles	Vlaar / Yanakiev (BUL); L 0–2 (10–21, 12–21)	Lamsfuß / Seidel (GER); L 0–2 (3–21, 15–21)	Birker / Stipsits (AUT); L 0–2 (16–21, 11–21)	4	—	Did not advance			=13
Maryna Ilyinskaya; Yelyzaveta Zharka	Women's doubles	Garino / Iversen (ITA); W 2–0 (21–9, 21–7)	Karlsson / Magnusson (SWE); L 0–2 (12–21, 13–21)	Bolotova / Davletova (RUS); L 0–2 (12–21, 14–21)	3	—	Did not advance			=9
Valeriy Atrashchenkov; Yelyzaveta Zharka	Mixed doubles	Zapico / Uslé (ESP); L 0–2 (10–21, 18–21)	Nøhr / Thygesen (DEN); L 0–2 (11–21, 20–22)	Ellis / Smith (GBR); L 0–2 (14–21, 4–21)	4	—	Did not advance			=13

== Basketball 3x3 ==
For the men's team, those Games were first since Ukraine had not qualified for Baku 2015. Women's team participated for the second time after having won silver in 2015.

Men

- Yevhen Balaban
- Andrii Kozhemiakin
- Dmytro Lypovtsev
- Oleksii Shchepkin

Team	Event	Group stage				Quarterfinals	Semifinals	Final / BM	
Team	Event	Opposition Score	Opposition Score	Opposition Score	Rank	Opposition Score	Opposition Score	Opposition Score	Rank
Ukraine	Men's tournament	Russia; L 14–21	France; W 18–14	Italy; W 21–16	3	Did not advance			

Women

- Veronika Kosmach
- Ganna Rulyova
- Yevheniia Spitkovska
- Tetyana Yurkevichus

Team	Event	Group stage				Quarterfinals	Semifinals	Final / BM	
Team	Event	Opposition Score	Opposition Score	Opposition Score	Rank	Opposition Score	Opposition Score	Opposition Score	Rank
Ukraine	Women's tournament	Estonia; L 17–20	Spain; W 17–15	Latvia; W 14–8	3	Did not advance			

== Beach soccer ==
This was second consecutive appearance for Ukrainian team. They qualified through the 2018 Euro Beach Soccer League by placing 7th in the final leg.

Men

- Andrii Borsuk
- Ihor Borsuk
- Ivan Hlutskyi
- Oleksandr Korniichuk
- Kostiantyn Makeiev
- Dmytro Medvid
- Andrii Nerush
- Roman Pachev
- Vitalii Sydorenko
- Dmytro Voitenko
- Yaroslav Zavorotnyi
- Oleh Zborovskyi

Team	Event	Group stage				Semifinals / Pl	Final / BM / Pl	
Team	Event	Opposition Score	Opposition Score	Opposition Score	Rank	Opposition Score	Opposition Score	Rank
Ukraine	Men's tournament	Italy; W 4–4 (pen. 4–3)	Spain; W 6–4	Russia; L 1–5	2 Q	Portugal; L 2–3 (a.e.t.)	Switzerland; L 4–5	4

== Boxing ==
Ukraine, as all other nations, was entitled to enter a male in each category. In women's boxing, Ukraine did not manage to qualify in two categories out of five (57 kg and 69 kg).

Men

Athlete	Category	Round of 32	Round of 16	Quarterfinals	Semifinals	Final	
Athlete	Category	Opposition Result	Opposition Result	Opposition Result	Opposition Result	Opposition Result	Rank
Nazar Kurotchyn	49 kg	—	Molina (ESP); L 0–5	did not advance			
Dmytro Zamotayev	52 kg	Bye	Yusifzada (AZE); W 4–1	Yafai (GBR); L 0–5	did not advance		
Mykola Butsenko	56 kg	Bye	Aliyev (AZE); W 4–1	Shakh (BLR); W 5–0	Raman (GER); W 3–2	Walker (IRL); L 0–5	2nd place, silver medalist(s)
Iurii Shestak	60 kg	Bye	Suciu (ROU); W 5–0	Asanau (BLR); L 1–4	did not advance		
Yaroslav Khartsyz	64 kg	Jensen (DEN); W RSC	Safaryants (BLR); W 5–0	McCormack (GBR); L 1–4	did not advance		
Yevhenii Barabanov	69 kg	Brunschweiler (SUI); W ABD	Ekinci (TUR); W 5–0	Dauhaliavets (BLR); W 4–1	Agrba (RUS); L 0–5	Did not advance	3rd place, bronze medalist(s)
Oleksandr Khyzhniak	75 kg	Abdilrasoon (FIN); W 5–0	Darchinyan (ARM); W 5–0	Bakshi (RUS); W 4–1	Csemez (SVK); W RSC	Cavallaro (ITA); W 5–0	1st place, gold medalist(s)
Stepan Hrekul	81 kg	Alfonso (AZE); L 0–5	did not advance				
Ramazan Muslimov	91 kg	—	Begadze (GEO); L 1–4	did not advance			
Victor Vykhryst	+91 kg	Bye	Veriasov (RUS); W 5–0	Babić (SRB); W 5–0	Milun (CRO); W RSC	Aliev (FRA); W 4–1	1st place, gold medalist(s)

Women

Athlete	Category	Round of 16	Quarterfinals	Semifinals	Final	
Athlete	Category	Opposition Result	Opposition Result	Opposition Result	Opposition Result	Rank
Tetyana Kob	51 kg	Lushchyk (BLR); W 5–0	Çakıroğlu (TUR); L 0–5	did not advance		
Iuliia Tsyplakova	60 kg	Yarshevich (BLR); L 1–4	did not advance			
Mariya Borutsa	75 kg	Bye	Sandakova (RUS); L 0–5	did not advance		

== Canoe sprint ==
The only event Ukrainian athletes did not participate in was Men's K-4 500 metres.

Men

Athlete	Event	Heat		Semi-final		Final	
Athlete	Event	Time	Rank	Time	Rank	Time	Rank
Oleh Borovyk	C-1 200 m	40.580	3 QF	Bye		46.080	7
Dmytro Ianchuk	C-1 1000 m	3:58.929	6 QS	3:51.019	6	Did not advance	
Andrii Rybachok; Yurii Vandiuk	C-2 1000 m	3:32.436	1 QF	Bye		3:41.692	2nd place, silver medalist(s)
Dmytro Danylenko	K-1 200 m	35.199	4 QS	35.188	3 QA	40.139	9
Oleh Kukharyk	K-1 1000 m	4:03.837	8	Did not advance			
Oleksandr Syromiatnykov	K-1 5000 m	—				23:29.990	17
Oleksandr Syromiatnykov; Oleh Kukharyk	K-2 1000 m	3:10.923	4 QS	3:12.910	1 QF	3:18.865	2nd place, silver medalist(s)

Women

Athlete	Event	Heat		Semi-final		Final	
Athlete	Event	Time	Rank	Time	Rank	Time	Rank
Anastasiia Chetverikova	C-1 200 m	49.123	2 QF	Bye		51.776	4
Liudmyla Luzan; Anastasiia Chetverikova	C-2 500 m	1:57.467	3 QF	Bye		2:15.044	5
Mariia Kichasova-Skoryk	K-1 200 m	42.436	4 QS	41.535	3 QA	42.723	5
Tetyana Yednak	K-1 500 m	1:50.667	3 QS	1:55.104	7 QB	2:10.715	15
Inna Hryshchun	K-1 5000 m	—				26:33.579	15
Mariya Povkh; Liudmyla Kuklinovska	K-2 200 m	38.076	3 QF	Bye		44.781	1st place, gold medalist(s)
Mariya Povkh; Liudmyla Kuklinovska	K-2 500 m	1:40.926	4 QS	1:39.092	2 QF	1:44.698	6
Mariia Kichasova-Skoryk; Nataliia Dokiienko; Anastasiia Todorova; Anastasiya Horlova	K-4 500 m	1:32.146	4 QS	1:34.367	4	Did not advance	

== Cycling ==
Ukraine participated in all cycling events.

=== Road ===
Men

Athlete	Event	Time	Rank
Andriy Vasylyuk	Men's road race	4:10:58	45
Andriy Vasylyuk	Men's road time trial	36:03.03	22
Oleksandr Golovash	Men's road race	4:16:10	86
Oleksandr Golovash	Men's road time trial	35:40.21	17
Vitaliy Buts	Men's road race	4:10:29	5
Mykhaylo Kononenko	Men's road race	4:16:10	85
Oleksandr Prevar	Men's road race	4:16:43	94

Women

Athlete	Event	Time	Rank
Tetyana Ryabchenko	Women's road race	3:08:24	20
Tetyana Ryabchenko	Women's road time trial	38:29.04	7
Valeriya Kononenko	Women's road race	3:08:24	29
Valeriya Kononenko	Women's road time trial	38:45.98	11

=== Track ===
Sprint

Athlete	Event	Qualification		Round of 64	Round of 64 Repechages	Round of 32	Round of 32 Repechages	Round of 16	Round of 16 Repechages	Quarterfinals	Semifinals	Final	
Athlete	Event	Time Speed (km/h)	Rank	Opposition Time Speed (km/h)	Opposition Time Speed (km/h)	Opposition Time Speed (km/h)	Opposition Time Speed (km/h)	Opposition Time Speed (km/h)	Opposition Time Speed (km/h)	Opposition Time Speed (km/h)	Opposition Time Speed (km/h)	Opposition Time Speed (km/h)	Rank
Tadei-Ivan Chebanets	Men's sprint	10.356	21 q	Dmitriev (RUS); L +0.053 R	Szalontay (HUN); Lukashevich (BLR); 3rd +0.113	Did not advance							
Olena Starikova	Women's sprint	10.928	5 q	Fidanza (ITA); W	Bye	Degrendele (BEL); W	Bye	Krupeckaitė (LTU); L +0.127 R	Marchant (GBR); Degrendele (BEL); W	Braspennincx (NED); L 1-2	Did not advance		
Lyubov Basova	Women's sprint	11.338	17 q	Krupeckaitė (LTU); L +0.085 R	Sibiak (POL); L +0.054	Did not advance							

Team sprint

Athletes	Event	Qualification		First round	Final	
Athletes	Event	Time Speed (km/h)	Rank	Opposition Time Speed (km/h)	Opposition Time Speed (km/h)	Rank
Vladyslav Denysenko; Tadei-Ivan Chebanets; Dmytro Stovbetskyi	Men's team sprint	45.829	9	Did not advance		
Olena Starikova; Lyubov Basova	Women's team sprint	33.805	3 Q	3 v 6 Lithuania; L +0.693	Did not advance	

Team pursuit

Athletes	Event	Qualification		First round	Final	
Athletes	Event	Time Speed (km/h)	Rank	Opposition Time Speed (km/h)	Opposition Time Speed (km/h)	Rank
Roman Gladysh; Volodymyr Dzhus; Vitaliy Hryniv; Vladyslav Shcherban	Men's team pursuit	4:04.723	6 Q	6; 4:04.504	Did not advance	
Yuliia Biriukova; Oksana Kliachina; Anna Nahirna; Hanna Solovey	Women's team pursuit	4:34.050	6 Q	6; 4:35.059	Did not advance	

Keirin

Athlete	Event	1st round	Repechage	2nd round	Final
Athlete	Event	Rank	Rank	Rank	Rank
Dmytro Stovbetskyi	Men's keirin	5 R	4	Did not advance	
Lyubov Basova	Women's keirin	2 Q	Bye	5	8 SF
Olena Starikova	Women's keirin	2 Q	Bye	5	10 SF

Madison

Athlete	Event	Points	Laps	Rank
Roman Gladysh; Vitaliy Hryniv	Men's madison	-7	-20	11
Oksana Kliachina; Anna Nahirna	Women's madison	3		7

Time trial

Athlete	Event	Qualification		Final	
Athlete	Event	Time	Rank	Time	Rank
Vladyslav Denysenko	Men's 1 km time trial	1:05.901	14	Did not advance	
Olena Starikova	Women's 500 m time trial	34.083	3 Q	33.389	2nd place, silver medalist(s)
Lyubov Basova	Women's 500 m time trial	35.490	13	Did not advance	

Individual pursuit

Athlete	Event	Qualification		Final	
Athlete	Event	Time Speed (km/h)	Rank	Opposition Time	Rank
Volodymyr Dzhus	Men's individual pursuit	4:30.521	9	Did not advance	
Oleh Kanaka	Men's individual pursuit	4:35.520	11	Did not advance	
Hanna Solovey	Women's individual pursuit	3:46.285	12	Did not advance	

Scratch

Athlete	Event	Rank
Volodymyr Dzhus	Men's scratch race	12
Tetyana Klimchenko	Women's scratch race	12

Points race

Athlete	Event	Sprint Points																Laps	Total	Rank
Athlete	Event	1	2	3	4	5	6	7	8	9	10	11	12	13	14	15	16	Laps	Total	Rank
Vitaliy Hryniv	Men's points race	0	0	0	0	0	0	2	0	0	0	0	0	0	0	0	0	0	2	14
Hanna Solovey	Women's points race	0	0	0	0	5	0	0	5	0	0	—	—	—	—	—	—	20	30	1st place, gold medalist(s)

Omnium

Athlete	Event	Scratch Race		Tempo Race			Elimination Race		Points Race			Total points	Rank
Athlete	Event	Rank	Points	Race Points	Rank	Points	Rank	Points	Race Points	Rank	Points	Total points	Rank
Roman Gladysh	Men's omnium	14	14	0	11	20	13	16	0	14	0	50	14
Yuliia Biriukova	Women's omnium	14	14	5	10	22	14	14	57	5	27	77	10

== Gymnastics ==
Ukraine was represented in all events but for aerobics.

=== Acrobatic ===
Women's groups

Athletes	Event	Final					
Athletes	Event	A	E	D	Penalty	Total points	Rank
Iryna Khyzhniak; Inna Kaplanska; Olena Vykhovanets	Balance	8.650	17.000	2.02		27.670	5
Iryna Khyzhniak; Inna Kaplanska; Olena Vykhovanets	Dynamic	8.600	17.300	1.52		27.420	6
Iryna Khyzhniak; Inna Kaplanska; Olena Vykhovanets	Combined	8.750	17.400	2.17		28.320	5

Mixed pairs

Athletes	Event	Final					
Athletes	Event	A	E	D	Penalty	Total points	Rank
Mariia Los; Vladyslav Kuzerenko	Balance	8.550	16.900	1.96	-0.3	27.110	5
Mariia Los; Vladyslav Kuzerenko	Dynamic	8.600	17.600	1.08		27.280	5
Mariia Los; Vladyslav Kuzerenko	Combined	8.250	16.700	1.58		26.530	6

=== Artistic ===
Men
Qualification

Athlete	Event	Qualification							
Athlete	Event	Apparatus						Total	Rank
Athlete	Event	F	PH	R	V	PB	HB	Total	Rank
Oleh Verniaiev	Men's artistic qualification	12.400	15.133 q	13.200	13.233	14.733 q	12.933	81.632	8 Q
Petro Pakhniuk	Men's artistic qualification	14.433 q	13.833	11.466	14.066	13.966	12.733	80.497	11 Q
Ihor Radivilov	Men's artistic qualification	—	—	14.700 q	15.000 q	—	—	DNC	

All-around

Athlete	Event	Final							
Athlete	Event	Apparatus						Total	Rank
Athlete	Event	F	PH	R	V	PB	HB	Total	Rank
Oleh Verniaiev	All-around	14.000	14.800	12.533	14.766	15.100	13.433	84.632	2nd place, silver medalist(s)
Petro Pakhniuk	All-around	13.366	13.933	13.466	14.733	15.033	13.500	84.031	4

Apparatus finals

Athlete	Event	Total	Rank
Oleh Verniaiev	Parallel bars	15.333	1st place, gold medalist(s)
Oleh Verniaiev	Pommel horse	14.900	2nd place, silver medalist(s)
Ihor Radivilov	Vault	14.649	3rd place, bronze medalist(s)
Ihor Radivilov	Rings	14.733	3rd place, bronze medalist(s)
Petro Pakhniuk	Floor	14.200	3rd place, bronze medalist(s)

Women
Qualification

Athlete	Event	Qualification					
Athlete	Event	Apparatus				Total	Rank
Athlete	Event	V	UB	BB	F	Total	Rank
Anastasia Bachynska	Women's artistic qualification	13.933	13.266	12.800	13.066 q	53.065	4 Q
Diana Varinska	Women's artistic qualification	13.300	13.900	12.933 q	12.700	52.833	5 Q
Anhelina Radivilova	Women's artistic qualification	13.266	11.033	12.500	12.966	49.765	19

All-around

Athlete	Event	Final					
Athlete	Event	Apparatus				Total	Rank
Athlete	Event	V	UB	BB	F	Total	Rank
Diana Varinska	All-around	13.800	12.700	13.000	13.266	52.766	3rd place, bronze medalist(s)
Anastasia Bachynska	All-around	13.800	11.266	13.000	11.600	49.666	14

Apparatus finals

Athlete	Event	Total	Rank
Anastasia Bachynska	Floor	13.200	1st place, gold medalist(s)
Diana Varinska	Balance beam	13.100	3rd place, bronze medalist(s)

=== Rhythmic ===
All-around final and apparatus qualification

Athlete	Event	Final									
Athlete	Event	Hoop	Apparatus rank	Ball	Apparatus rank	Clubs	Apparatus rank	Ribbon	Apparatus rank	Total	Final rank
Vlada Nikolchenko	Individual all-around	22.400	1 Q	17.750	9	21.625	3 Q	16.100	11	77.875	5

Apparatus finals

Athlete	Event	Final				
Athlete	Event	D score	E score	Penalty	Total	Rank
Vlada Nikolchenko	Clubs	13.300	8.450		21.750	3rd place, bronze medalist(s)
Vlada Nikolchenko	Hoop	13.200	8.250		21.450	3rd place, bronze medalist(s)

Group finals

Athletes	Event	Final				
Athletes	Event	D score	E score	Penalty	Total	Rank
Alina Bykhno; Tetiana Dovzhenko; Diana Myzherytska; Anastasiya Voznyak; Valeriya Yuzviak	Group 5 balls	16.300	5.500		21.800	6
Alina Bykhno; Tetiana Dovzhenko; Diana Myzherytska; Anastasiya Voznyak; Valeriya Yuzviak	Group 3 hoops and 4 clubs	18.200	8.175		26.375	2nd place, silver medalist(s)

Group all-around

Athletes	Event	Final			
Athletes	Event	5 apps	3+2 apps	Total	Rank
Alina Bykhno; Tetiana Dovzhenko; Diana Myzherytska; Anastasiya Voznyak; Valeriya Yuzviak	Group all-around	21.800	26.375	48.175	5

=== Trampoline ===
Athletes	Event	Qualification				Final						
Athletes	Event	Routine 1	Routine 2	Total	Rank	D	E	HD	ToF	Penalty	Total	Rank
Mykola Prostorov	Men's trampoline	51.430	58.780	110.210	5 Q	17.100	15.400	9.100	16.800		58.400	4
Anton Davydenko	Men's trampoline	49.710	54.885	104.595	15	DNQ						
Anton Davydenko; Mykola Prostorov	Men's synchronized trampoline	No qualification				15.400	7.700	9.050	19.200		51.350	2nd place, silver medalist(s)
Maryna Kyiko	Women's trampoline	47.205	51.655	98.860	7 Q	14.400	15.100	9.100	15.305		53.905	4
Svitlana Malkova	Women's trampoline	46.135	49.795	95.930	13	DNQ						
Maryna Kyiko; Svitlana Malkova	Women's synchronized trampoline	No qualification				13.100	7.550	9.550	18.440	0.400	48.240	2nd place, silver medalist(s)

== Judo ==
Ukraine was not represented in the men's 81 kg, women's 52 kg and women's 70 kg. Vasylyna Kyrychenko (women's +78 kg) had been included by the NOC of Ukraine to the list of participants, though she did not compete at the Games.

Men

Athlete	Category	Round of 64	Round of 32	Round of 16	Quarterfinals	Semifinals	Final	
Athlete	Category	Opposition Result	Opposition Result	Opposition Result	Opposition Result	Opposition Result	Opposition Result	Rank
Artem Lesiuk	60 kg	—	Khyar (FRA); L 00–11	did not advance				
Georgii Zantaraia	66 kg	—	Saywell (MLT); W 11–00	Jereb (SLO); W 10–00	Shershan (BLR); W 01–00	Niniashvili (GEO); W 10–00	Medves (ITA); W 10–00	1st place, gold medalist(s)
Bohdan Iadov	66 kg	—	Shikhalizada (AZE); W 01–00	Petřikov (CZE); L 00–01	did not advance			
Artem Khomula	73 kg	Esposito (ITA); W 10–01	Saraiva (POR); W 01–00	Shavdatuashvili (GEO); L 00–10	did not advance			
Dmytro Kanivets	73 kg	Sterpu (MDA); W 11–01	Mogushkov (RUS); L 00–01	did not advance				
Quedjau Nhabali	90 kg	Bye	Sherazadishvili (ESP); L 00–01	did not advance				
Anton Savytskiy	100 kg	—	Gasimov (AZE); L 00–01	did not advance				
Iakiv Khammo	+100 kg	—	Chelaru (ESP); W 10–00	Sarnacki (POL); L 00–10	did not advance			
Andrii Koleśnyk	+100 kg	—	Croitoru (ROU); W 10–00	Krpálek (CZE); L 11–00	did not advance			

Women

Athlete	Category	Round of 32	Round of 16	Quarterfinals	Semifinals	Final	
Athlete	Category	Opposition Result	Opposition Result	Opposition Result	Opposition Result	Opposition Result	Rank
Daria Bilodid	48 kg	Bye	Csernoviczki (HUN); W 10–00	Clément (FRA); W 10–00	Nikolić (SRB); W 10–01	Dolgova (RUS); W 01–00	1st place, gold medalist(s)
Maryna Cherniak	48 kg	Martínez (ESP); L 00–10	did not advance				
Mariia Skora	57 kg	Verhagen (NED); L 00–11	did not advance				
Yuliia Hrebenozhko	63 kg	Schlesinger (GBR); L 00–10	did not advance				
Anastasiya Turchyn	78 kg	Bye	Steenhuis (NED); L w/o	did not advance			
Halyna Tarasova	+78 kg	Bye	Pakenytė (LTU); W 10–00	Cerić (BIH); L 01–10	M'Bairo (FRA); W 11–01	Kindzerska (AZE); L 01–11	5

Mixed team

Athlete	Category	Round of 16	Quarterfinals	Semifinals	Final	
Athlete	Category	Opposition Result	Opposition Result	Opposition Result	Opposition Result	Rank
Andrii Koleśnyk; Mariia Skora; Dmytro Kanivets; Yuliia Hrebenozhko; Quedjau Nhabali; Halyna Tarasova	Mixed team	Slovenia; L 3–4	did not advance			

- Ukraine vs. Slovenia
  - Andrii Koleśnyk 0-1 Vito Dragič
  - Mariia Skora 1-0 Kaja Kajzer
  - Dmytro Kanivets 0-1 Martin Hojak
  - Yuliia Hrebenozhko 0-1 Anka Pogačnik
  - Quedjau Nhabali 1-0 David Kukovica
  - Halyna Tarasova w/o
  - Mariia Skora 0-1 Kaja Kajzer

== Karate ==
Ukrainian athletes managed to qualify for 6 out of 12 events in karate and they won medals in all but for one event they took part in. Ukraine was represented only in kumite competitions.

Men

Athlete	Category	Group stage				Semifinals	Final	
Athlete	Category	Opposition Result	Opposition Result	Opposition Result	Rank	Opposition Result	Opposition Result	Rank
Stanislav Horuna	75 kg	Artamonov (EST); W 6–3	Korabau (BLR); L 3–3	Bitsch (GER); W 1–0	1 Q	Hárspataki (HUN); W 3–2	Aghayev (AZE); W 4–0	1st place, gold medalist(s)
Valerii Chobotar	84 kg	Malović (MNE); W 1–0	Karaqi (KOS); W 4–3	Kvesić (CRO); L 0–3	2 Q	Aktaş (TUR); L 1–4	Did not advance	3rd place, bronze medalist(s)

Women

Athlete	Category	Group stage				Semifinals	Final	
Athlete	Category	Opposition Result	Opposition Result	Opposition Result	Rank	Opposition Result	Opposition Result	Rank
Kateryna Kryva	50 kg	Plank (AUT); D 0–0	Milivojčević (SRB); W 1–0	Bouderbane (FRA); L 2–7	3	Did not advance		
Anzhelika Terliuga	55 kg	Yakan (TUR); W 1–0	Connell (GBR); W 3–1	Goranova (BUL); L 0–8	2 Q	Bitsch (GER); W 8–2	Goranova (BUL); L 3–4	2nd place, silver medalist(s)
Anita Serogina	61 kg	Preković (SRB); W 4–0	Philippe (FRA); D 0–0	Alstadsæther (NOR); W 3–0	2 Q	Çoban (TUR); W 2–2	Ristić (SLO); W 3–1	1st place, gold medalist(s)
Halyna Melnyk	68 kg	Pedersen (DEN); D 0–0	Aliakseyeva (BLR); W 4–1	Quirici (SUI); L 0–1	2 Q	Zaretska (AZE); L 0–1	Did not advance	3rd place, bronze medalist(s)

== Sambo ==
Ukrainian athletes competed in 15 out of 18 events (except for men's 68 kg, men's 74 kg and men's 82 kg).

Men

Athlete	Category	Quarterfinals	Semifinals/Repechage	Final/Bronze medal bout	
Athlete	Category	Opposition Result	Opposition Result	Opposition Result	Rank
Roman Bratchenko	52 kg	Kirakosyan (ARM); L 0–7	Nadareishvili (GEO); L 0–0^{VH}	did not advance	
Ivan Pylypiak	57 kg	Manukyan (ARM); L 1–10	Celik (TUR); L 1–11	did not advance	
Dmytro Yevdoshenko	62 kg	Bagdasarian (RUS); L 0–2	Vu (GER); W 8–0	Aniskevich (BLR); L 1–2	5
Dmytro Stetsenko	90 kg	Ryabov (RUS); L 0–4	Vacek (CZE); W 8–0	Gerasimenko (SRB); L 0–8	5
Andrii Boloban	100 kg	Stsepankou (BLR); W 9–1	Loriashvili (GEO); L 0–3	Tachii (MDA); L 2–3	5
Stanislav Bondarenko	+100 kg	Papadopoulos (CYP); W 12–4	Rybak (BLR); L 1–7	Osipenko (RUS); L 0–1	5

Women

Athlete	Category	Quarterfinals	Semifinals/Repechage	Final/Bronze medal bout	
Athlete	Category	Opposition Result	Opposition Result	Opposition Result	Rank
Anastasiia Novikova	48 kg	Tsvetanova (BUL); W 2–0	Lalazaryan (ARM); W 0^{VH}–0	Bondareva (RUS); L 0–2	2nd place, silver medalist(s)
Mariia Buiok	52 kg	Kovacs (ROU); W 8–0	Ryabova (RUS); L 0–0	Eșanu (MDA); L 1–1	5
Nataliya Ilkiv	56 kg	Kazeniuk (RUS); L 0–2	Donos (MDA); W 0^{VI}–0	Fournier (FRA); L 2–5	5
Anastasiia Shevchenko	60 kg	Jiménez (ESP); L 0–1	Abashidze (GEO); W 1–0	Kostenko (RUS); L 0–2	5
Olena Sayko	64 kg	Cabas (ESP); W 1–0	Perin (ITA); W 5–1	Onoprienko (RUS); L 0–7	2nd place, silver medalist(s)
Kateryna Moskalova	68 kg	Mokhnatkina (RUS); W 1–1	Jandrić (SRB); W 2–2	Babić (CRO); L 0–4	2nd place, silver medalist(s)
Nataliya Smal	72 kg	Ambartsumian (RUS); W 2–1	Zhylinskaya (BLR); L 0–2	Podelenczki (ROU); W 4–0	3rd place, bronze medalist(s)
Halyna Kovalska	80 kg	Masy (BEL); W 9–0	Oryashkova (BUL); L 0–2	Leonidze (GEO); W 4–1	3rd place, bronze medalist(s)
Anastasiia Sapsai	+80 kg	Stefanovič (LTU); W 9–0	Kaliuzhnaya (BLR); W 5–0	Kebadze (GEO); W 4–0	1st place, gold medalist(s)

== Shooting ==
Ukraine athletes managed to qualify for almost all events with the exception of men's trap and, respectively, mixed team trap. Ukraine was represented only in skeet competitions by just one athlete.

Athlete	Event	Qualification		Qualification 2		Final	
Athlete	Event	Points	Rank	Points	Rank	Points	Rank
Oleh Omelchuk	Men's 10 metre air pistol	580-22x	5 Q	—		580	2nd place, silver medalist(s)
Pavlo Korostylov	Men's 10 metre air pistol	577-19x	13	—		DNA	
Pavlo Korostylov	Men's 25 metre rapid fire pistol	570-18x	17	—		DNA	
Oleksandr Petriv	Men's 25 metre rapid fire pistol	566-12x	21	—		DNA	
Serhiy Kulish	Men's 10 m air rifle	627.1	11	—		DNA	
Serhiy Kulish	Men's 50 metre rifle three positions	1176-61x	6 Q	—		415.0	6
Oleh Tsarkov	Men's 10 m air rifle	622.0	29	—		DNA	
Jury Sukhorukov	Men's 50 metre rifle three positions	1157-44x	27	—		DNA	
Mykola Milchev	Men's skeet	116	16	—		DNA	
Olena Kostevych	Women's 10 metre air pistol	573-12x	7 Q	—		176.6	5
Olena Kostevych	Women's 25 metre pistol	571-14x	23	—		DNA	
Polina Konarieva	Women's 10 metre air pistol	568-10x	21	—		DNA	
Oksana Kovalchuk	Women's 25 metre pistol	576-17x	17	—		DNA	
Natallia Kalnysh	Women's 10 metre air rifle	620.6	35	—		DNA	
Natallia Kalnysh	Women's 50 metre rifle three positions	1160-56x	9	—		DNA	
Anna Ilina	Women's 10 metre air rifle	614.2	40	—		DNA	
Anna Ilina	Women's 50 metre rifle three positions	1143-46x	37	—		DNA	
Olena Okhotska	Women's trap	99	23	—		DNA	
Iryna Malovichko	Women's skeet	107	21	—		DNA	
Polina Konarieva; Pavlo Korostylov	Mixed team 10 metre air pistol	574-13x	6 Q	377-9x	6	DNA	
Olena Kostevych; Oleh Omelchuk	Mixed team 10 metre air pistol	572-12x	10	DNA			
Olena Kostevych; Pavlo Korostylov	Mixed team 50 metre rifle prone	550-7x	6 Q	Breś / Daniluk (POL)	W 384.7–384.3	180.0+187.3	3rd place, bronze medalist(s)
Oksana Kovalchuk; Oleksandr Petriv	Mixed team 50 metre rifle prone	545-10x	10	DNA			
Olena Kostevych; Oleh Omelchuk	Mixed team 50 metre pistol	370-10x	1 Q	Kruchanok / Zaichyk (BLR)	L 177–178	DNA	
Oksana Kovalchuk; Pavlo Korostylov	Mixed team 50 metre pistol	342-3x	10	DNA			
Anna Ilina; Oleh Tsarkov	Mixed team 10 metre air rifle	621.6	17	DNA			
Natallia Kalnysh; Serhiy Kulish	Mixed team 10 metre air rifle	620.2	22	DNA			
Natallia Kalnysh; Oleh Tsarkov	Mixed team 50 metre rifle prone	412.1	7 Q	Straub / Dallinger (GER)	L 202.8–205.3	DNA	
Anna Ilina; Serhiy Kulish	Mixed team 50 metre rifle prone	411.5	13	DNA			
Mykola Milchev; Iryna Malovichko	Mixed team skeet	134	11	—		DNA	

== Table tennis ==
Ukraine did not qualify for men's team and mixed doubles.

Individual

Athlete	Event	Round 1	Round 2	Round 3	Round 4	Quarterfinals	Semifinals	Final/Bronze medal game	
Athlete	Event	Opposition Result	Opposition Result	Opposition Result	Opposition Result	Opposition Result	Opposition Result	Opposition Result	Rank
Kou Lei	Men's singles	Bye	Ionescu (ROU); W 4–2	Robles (ESP); W 4–1	Shibaev (RUS); W 4–1	Nuytinck (BEL); W 4–2	Groth (DEN); L 0–4	Pucar (CRO); L 1–4	4
Yevhen Pryshchepa	Men's singles	Bye	Jančařík (CZE); W 4–2	Pucar (CRO); L 1–4	did not advance				
Hanna Haponova	Women's singles	Bye	Lupulesku (SRB); W 4–2	Eerland (NED); W 4–1	Yu (POR); L 1–4	did not advance			
Margaryta Pesotska	Women's singles	Bye	Bye	Yang (MON); L 1–4	did not advance				

Team

Athlete	Event	First round	Quarterfinals	Semifinals	Final	
Athlete	Event	Opposition Result	Opposition Result	Opposition Result	Opposition Result	Rank
Hanna Haponova; Tetyana Bilenko; Margaryta Pesotska	Women's team	Luxembourg; W 3–1	Hungary; L 0–3	did not advance		

- First round

27 June 2019	Luxembourg	1 – 3	Ukraine

Danielle Konsbruck / Ni Xialian	0–3	Tetyana Bilenko / Hanna Haponova	10–12, 5–11, 8–11
Sarah De Nutte	0–3	Margaryta Pesotska	10–12, 7–11, 7–11
Ni Xialian	3–1	Hanna Haponova	11–3, 10–12, 11–3, 11–5
Sarah De Nutte	0–3	Tetyana Bilenko	6–11, 7–11, 12–14

- Quarterfinal

27 June 2019	Hungary	3 – 0	Ukraine

Szandra Pergel / Dóra Madarász	3–1	Tetyana Bilenko / Hanna Haponova	5–11, 11–2, 11–4, 11–5
Georgina Póta	3–2	Margaryta Pesotska	6–11, 11–9, 12–10, 9–11, 11–9
Dóra Madarász	3–0	Hanna Haponova	11–1, 11–6, 11–10

== Wrestling ==
Ukraine was represented in almost all events except men's freestyle 86 kg.

Men's freestyle

Athlete	Category	Round of 16	Quarterfinals	Semifinals/Repechage	Final/Bronze medal bout	
Athlete	Category	Opposition Result	Opposition Result	Opposition Result	Opposition Result	Rank
Taras Markovych	57 kg	Bye	Andreyeu (BLR); W 7–3	Mićić (SRB); L 4–7	Atlı (TUR); L 9–12	5
Hor Ohannesian	65 kg	Kılıçsallayan (TUR); W 11–0	Mansour (ITA); W 10–0	Aliyev (AZE); L 4–4	Frangulyan (ARM); W 8–2	3rd place, bronze medalist(s)
Vasyl Mykhailov	74 kg	Gulajev (SVK); W 3–2	Vasilioglo (ROU); W 2–2	Demirtaş (TUR); L 2–5	Gadzhiyev (AZE); L 1–9	5
Murazi Mchedlidze	97 kg	Şahin (TUR); W 6–0	Ceban (MDA); W 6–5	Gadzhiev (AZE); L 0–7	Odikadze (GEO); L 0–5	5
Oleksandr Khotsianivskyi	125 kg	Baran (POL); W 6–0	Galstyan (ARM); W 10–0	Khizriev (RUS); L 1–7	Yaşarlı (TUR); W 2–1	3rd place, bronze medalist(s)

Greco-Roman

Athlete	Category	Round of 16	Quarterfinals	Semifinals/Repechage	Final/Bronze medal bout	
Athlete	Category	Opposition Result	Opposition Result	Opposition Result	Opposition Result	Rank
Zhora Abovian	60 kg	Drozd (BLR); W 6–3	Angelov (BUL); W 4–1	Maryanyan (RUS); L 0–9	Ciobanu (MDA); L 1–3	5
Oleksii Kalinichenko	67 kg	Krasznai (HUN); W 8–0	Başar (TUR); W 5–0	Kabaloev (RUS); L 0–4	Daurov (BLR); L 2–3	5
Elmar Nuraliiev	77 kg	Chalyan (ARM); L 0–9	Did not advance	Beşleaga (MDA); L 0–7	Did not advance	
Zhan Beleniuk	87 kg	Manukyan (ARM); W 5–1	Kułynycz (POL); W 9–1	Kuliyeu (BLR); W 3–1	Abbasov (AZE); W 3–1	1st place, gold medalist(s)
Mykola Krysov	97 kg	Golovin (RUS); L 0–11	Did not advance			
Mykola Kuchmii	130 kg	Bye	Hryshchanka (BLR); L 1–3	Płowiec (POL); W 7–1	Semenov (RUS); L 1–10	3rd place, bronze medalist(s)

Women's freestyle

Athlete	Category	Round of 16	Quarterfinals	Semifinals/Repechage	Final/Bronze medal bout	
Athlete	Category	Opposition Result	Opposition Result	Opposition Result	Opposition Result	Rank
Oksana Livach	50 kg	Cioclea (ROU); W 12–1	Selishka (BUL); W 2–1	Chyryk (BLR); W 5–0	Stadnik (AZE); L 1–7	2nd place, silver medalist(s)
Yuliya Khalvadzhy	53 kg	Rueda (ESP); W 10–0	Dénes (HUN); W 10–2	Orshush (RUS); W 7–4	Mattsson (SWE); L 4–6	2nd place, silver medalist(s)
Iryna Chykhradze	57 kg	Rivière (FRA); W 3–2	Nichita (MDA); L 2–4	Did not advance		
Yuliya Tkach	62 kg	Pérez (ESP); W 6–0	Kuznetsova (RUS); W 6–1	Yusein (BUL); W 11–8	Gambarova (AZE); W 4–0	1st place, gold medalist(s)
Alla Cherkasova	68 kg	Da Col (ITA); W 10–0	Wieszczek (POL); W 12–2	Bratchikova (RUS); L 2–4	Fransson (SWE); W 6–2	3rd place, bronze medalist(s)
Alla Belinska	76 kg	Oryashkova (BUL); W 10–0	Mäe (EST); L 0–8	Did not advance		
