= Gymnastics at the 2019 European Games – Men's trampoline =

Men's trampoline at the 2019 European Games
- Venue: Minsk-Arena
- Date: 25 June
- Competitors: 24 from 16 nations
- Winning score: 60.045

Medalists
gold medal	Uladzislau Hancharou	Belarus
silver medal	Mikhail Melnik	Russia
bronze medal	Diogo Ganchinho	Portugal

The men's trampoline competition at the 2019 European Games was held at the Minsk-Arena on 25 June 2019.

== Qualification ==
The top six gymnasts with one per country advanced to the final.

Rank	Gymnast	Routine 1	Routine 2	Total	Qual.
1	Uladzislau Hancharou (BLR)	52.850	60.630	113.480	Q
2	Diogo Ganchinho (POR)	51.515	59.145	110.660	Q
3	Mikhail Melnik (RUS)	51.985	58.650	110.635	Q
4	Aleh Rabtsau (BLR)	51.885	58.570	110.455	
5	Mykola Prostorov (UKR)	51.430	58.780	110.210	Q
6	Allan Morante (FRA)	51.395	58.415	109.810	Q
7	Diogo Abreu (POR)	52.085	57.370	109.455	
8	Sébastien Martiny (FRA)	50.240	57.620	107.860	
9	Benjamin Kjær (DEN)	51.535	56.185	107.720	Q
10	Corey Walkes (GBR)	50.090	56.960	107.050	R1
11	Łukasz Jaworski (POL)	49.900	56.875	106.775	R2
12	Flavio Cannone (ITA)	48.895	56.490	105.385	
13	Marios Grapsas (GRE)	49.455	55.915	105.370	
14	Mariyan Mihalev (BUL)	49.590	55.490	105.080	
15	Anton Davydenko (UKR)	49.710	54.885	104.595	
16	Måns Åberg (SWE)	49.280	52.045	101.325	
17	Gürkan Mutlu (TUR)	50.680	50.395	101.075	
18	Tengizi Koshkadze (GEO)	51.515	44.975	96.490	
19	Andrey Yudin (RUS)	51.580	30.680	82.260	
20	Ruslan Aghamirov (AZE)	48.440	17.045	65.485	
21	Jonas Nordfors (SWE)	50.850	11.950	62.800	
22	Artur Zakrzewski (POL)	50.700	6.435	57.135	
23	Ilya Grishunin (AZE)	50.500	6.360	56.860	
24	Adam Sült (CZE)	47.935	5.805	53.740	

== Final ==
Rank	Gymnast	D Score	E Score	HD Score	ToF Score	Penalty	Total
1st place, gold medalist(s)	Uladzislau Hancharou (BLR)	17.900	15.900	9.400	16.845		60.045
2nd place, silver medalist(s)	Mikhail Melnik (RUS)	17.300	15.300	9.500	17.335		59.435
3rd place, bronze medalist(s)	Diogo Ganchinho (POR)	17.100	15.900	9.000	16.660		58.660
4	Mykola Prostorov (UKR)	17.100	15.400	9.100	16.800		58.400
5	Allan Morante (FRA)	17.100	15.100	8.900	17.290		58.390
6	Benjamin Kjær (DEN)	16.300	14.000	9.500	16.450		56.250
