= Gymnastics at the 2019 European Games – Men's synchronized trampoline =

Men's synchronized trampoline at the 2019 European Games
- Venue: Minsk-Arena
- Date: 24 June
- Competitors: 16 from 8 nations
- Winning score: 51.450

Medalists
gold medal	Łukasz Jaworski; Artur Zakrzewski	Poland
silver medal	Anton Davydenko; Mykola Prostorov	Ukraine
bronze medal	Sébastien Martiny; Allan Morante	France

The men's synchronized trampoline competition at the 2019 European Games was held at the Minsk-Arena on 24 June 2019.

== Results ==
Rank	Gymnast	Nation	D Score	E Score	HD Score	Syn Score	Pen	Total
1st place, gold medalist(s)	Łukasz Jaworski; Artur Zakrzewski	Poland	15.600	7.850	9.200	18.800		51.450
2nd place, silver medalist(s)	Anton Davydenko; Mykola Prostorov	Ukraine	15.400	7.700	9.050	19.200		51.350
3rd place, bronze medalist(s)	Sébastien Martiny; Allan Morante	France	15.800	8.050	9.400	17.540		50.790
4	Diogo Abreu; Diogo Ganchinho	Portugal	15.800	8.050	9.450	17.420		50.720
5	Ruslan Aghamirov; Ilya Grishunin	Azerbaijan	15.400	7.750	9.150	15.600		47.900
6	Måns Åberg; Jonas Nordfors	Sweden	13.400	6.800	8.100	14.700		43.000
7	Mikhail Melnik; Andrey Yudin	Russia	2.000	0.900	1.000	1.960		5.860
8	Uladzislau Hancharou; Aleh Rabtsau	Belarus	2.000	0.900	0.900	1.900		5.700
