= Gymnastics at the 2019 European Games – Women's synchronized trampoline =

Women's synchronized trampoline at the 2019 European Games
- Venue: Minsk-Arena
- Date: 25 June
- Competitors: 16 from 8 nations
- Winning score: 50.230

Medalists
gold medal	Hanna Hancharova; Maria Makharynskaya	Belarus
silver medal	Maryna Kyiko; Svitlana Malkova	Ukraine
bronze medal	Irina Kundius; Yana Pavlova	Russia

The women's synchronized trampoline competition at the 2019 European Games was held at the Minsk-Arena on 25 June 2019.

== Results ==
Rank	Gymnast	Nation	D Score	E Score	HD Score	Syn Score	Pen	Total
1st place, gold medalist(s)	Hanna Hancharova; Maria Makharynskaya	Belarus	13.100	8.400	9.550	19.180		50.230
2nd place, silver medalist(s)	Maryna Kyiko; Svitlana Malkova	Ukraine	13.100	7.550	9.550	18.440	0.400	48.240
3rd place, bronze medalist(s)	Irina Kundius; Yana Pavlova	Russia	12.300	8.300	8.900	18.640		48.140
4	Marine Jurbert; Léa Labrousse	France	11.900	8.150	9.200	18.300		47.550
5	Romee Pol; Niamh Slattery	Netherlands	11.500	7.250	9.050	19.400		47.200
6	Beatriz Martins; Sílvia Saiote	Portugal	11.300	7.700	9.000	18.380		46.380
7	Hristina Peneva; Mariela Peneva	Bulgaria	11.200	7.300	8.900	16.480		43.880
8	Teona Janjgava; Luba Golovina	Georgia	9.400	6.150	7.350	14.340	0.200	37.040
