= Sambo at the 2019 European Games =

- Venue: Minsk Sports Palace
- Date: 22–23 June
- Competitors: 141 (71 men, 70 women) from 28 nations

Sambo competitions at the 2019 European Games were held on 22 and 23 June 2019 at the Minsk Sports Palace.

== Qualification ==
Qualification was based on the ranking list prepared by European Sambo Federation.

| NOC | Men | | | | | | | | | Women | | | | | | | | | Total |
| NOC | 52 | 57 | 62 | 68 | 74 | 82 | 90 | 100 | +100 | 48 | 52 | 56 | 60 | 64 | 68 | 72 | 80 | +80 | Total |
|---|---|---|---|---|---|---|---|---|---|---|---|---|---|---|---|---|---|---|---|
| Armenia | X | X | | | X | X | X | | | X | | | | | | | | | 6 |
| Azerbaijan | X | X | X | X | X | X | | | | | | | | | | X | | | 7 |
| Belarus | X | X | X | X | X | X | X | X | X | X | X | X | X | X | X | X | X | X | 18 |
| Belgium | | | | | | | | | | | | | | | | | X | | 1 |
| Bulgaria | | ~~X~~ | | X | X | | | | | X | X | | | | | | X | | 5 |
| Croatia | | | | | X | | | | | | | | | | X | | | | 2 |
| Cyprus | | | | | | | | | X | | | | | | | | | | 1 |
| Czech Republic | | | | | | | X | | | | | | | | | | | | 1 |
| Estonia | | | X | | | | | | | | | | X | | | | | | 2 |
| France | | | | | | | X | X | X | X | | X | | | X | X | X | X | 9 |
| Georgia | X | X | X | X | X | X | X | X | X | | | X | X | | | X | X | X | 14 |
| Germany | | | X | | | | | | | | | | | X | | | | | 2 |
| Greece | | | X | | X | X | | | | | | X | | X | | | | | 5 |
| Hungary | | | | | | | | X | | | | | | | | | | | 1 |
| Italy | | | | X | | X | | | | | | | | X | | | | | 3 |
| Latvia | | | | | | | | X | | | | | | | | | | | 1 |
| Lithuania | X | | | | | | | | | | | | | | | | | X | 2 |
| Moldova | | | | | | X | | X | | | X | X | X | | X | X | | | 7 |
| Netherlands | | | | | | | | | | | | | | | | | X | | 1 |
| North Macedonia | | | | X | | | | | | | | | | | | | | | 1 |
| Poland | | | | | | | | | | | | | | | X | | | | 1 |
| Romania | X | | | X | | | | | | X | X | X | X | X | | X | | X | 9 |
| Russia | X | X | X | X | X | X | X | X | X | X | X | X | X | X | X | X | X | X | 18 |
| Serbia | | | | | | | X | | X | | | | | | X | | | | 3 |
| Slovakia | | | | | | | | | | | X | | | | | | | | 1 |
| Spain | | | | | | | | | X | | X | | X | X | | | | | 4 |
| Turkey | | X | | | | | | | | | | | | | | | | | 1 |
| Ukraine | X | X | X | | | | X | X | X | X | X | X | X | X | X | X | X | X | 15 |
| 28 NOCs | 8 | 7 | 8 | 8 | 8 | 8 | 8 | 8 | 8 | 7 | 8 | 8 | 8 | 8 | 8 | 8 | 8 | 7 | 141 |

== Medal summary ==
=== Medal table ===
* Host nation (Belarus)

| Rank | Nation | Gold | Silver | Bronze | Total |
|---|---|---|---|---|---|
| 1 | Russia | 7 | 3 | 8 | 18 |
| 2 | Georgia | 4 | 3 | 4 | 11 |
| 3 | Belarus* | 3 | 4 | 8 | 15 |
| 4 | Ukraine | 1 | 3 | 2 | 6 |
| 5 | Armenia | 1 | 1 | 1 | 3 |
| 6 | Bulgaria | 1 | 0 | 1 | 2 |
| 7 | Croatia | 1 | 0 | 0 | 1 |
| 8 | Azerbaijan | 0 | 1 | 2 | 3 |
| 8 | Moldova | 0 | 1 | 2 | 3 |
| 10 | Greece | 0 | 1 | 0 | 1 |
| 10 | Latvia | 0 | 1 | 0 | 1 |
| 12 | Romania | 0 | 0 | 3 | 3 |
| 13 | Serbia | 0 | 0 | 2 | 2 |
| 13 | Spain | 0 | 0 | 2 | 2 |
| 15 | France | 0 | 0 | 1 | 1 |
| Totals (15 entries) | | 18 | 18 | 36 | 72 |

=== Men's events ===
| Event | Gold | Silver | Bronze |
|---|---|---|---|
| 52 kg | Tigran Kirakosyan (ARM) | Aghasif Samadov (AZE) | Andrei Kurbakov (RUS) |
| 52 kg | Tigran Kirakosyan (ARM) | Aghasif Samadov (AZE) | Givi Nadareishvili (GEO) |
| 57 kg | Vakhtangi Chidrashvili (GEO) | Sayan Khertek (RUS) | Uladzislau Burdz (BLR) |
| 57 kg | Vakhtangi Chidrashvili (GEO) | Sayan Khertek (RUS) | Mehman Khalilov (AZE) |
| 62 kg | Ruslan Bagdasarian (RUS) | Savvas Karakizidis (GRE) | Ivan Aniskevich (BLR) |
| 62 kg | Ruslan Bagdasarian (RUS) | Savvas Karakizidis (GRE) | Genadi Chirgadze (GEO) |
| 68 kg | Aliaksandr Koksha (BLR) | Mindia Liluashvili (GEO) | Nikita Kletskov (RUS) |
| 68 kg | Aliaksandr Koksha (BLR) | Mindia Liluashvili (GEO) | Emil Hasanov (AZE) |
| 74 kg | Levan Nakhutsrishvili (GEO) | Stanislav Skryabin (RUS) | Arsen Ghazaryan (ARM) |
| 74 kg | Levan Nakhutsrishvili (GEO) | Stanislav Skryabin (RUS) | Stsiapan Papou (BLR) |
| 82 kg | Andrey Perepelyuk (RUS) | Davit Grigoryan (ARM) | Besarioni Berulava (GEO) |
| 82 kg | Andrey Perepelyuk (RUS) | Davit Grigoryan (ARM) | Tsimafei Yemelyanau (BLR) |
| 90 kg | Sergey Ryabov (RUS) | Andrei Kazusionak (BLR) | Dmitrij Gerasimenko (SRB) |
| 90 kg | Sergey Ryabov (RUS) | Andrei Kazusionak (BLR) | Paata Ghviniashvili (GEO) |
| 100 kg | Daviti Loriashvili (GEO) | Viktors Reško (LAT) | Alsim Chernoskulov (RUS) |
| 100 kg | Daviti Loriashvili (GEO) | Viktors Reško (LAT) | Denis Tachii (MDA) |
| +100 kg | Beka Berdzenishvili (GEO) | Yury Rybak (BLR) | Artem Osipenko (RUS) |
| +100 kg | Beka Berdzenishvili (GEO) | Yury Rybak (BLR) | Vladimir Gajić (SRB) |

=== Women's events ===
| Event | Gold | Silver | Bronze |
|---|---|---|---|
| 48 kg | Elena Bondareva (RUS) | Anastasiia Novikova (UKR) | Anfisa Kapayeva (BLR) |
| 48 kg | Elena Bondareva (RUS) | Anastasiia Novikova (UKR) | Tsvetelina Tsvetanova (BUL) |
| 52 kg | Diana Ryabova (RUS) | Maryna Zharskaya (BLR) | Irene Díaz (ESP) |
| 52 kg | Diana Ryabova (RUS) | Maryna Zharskaya (BLR) | Paulina Eșanu (MDA) |
| 56 kg | Tatiana Kazeniuk (RUS) | Anastasiia Arkhipava (BLR) | Laure Fournier (FRA) |
| 56 kg | Tatiana Kazeniuk (RUS) | Anastasiia Arkhipava (BLR) | Daniela Poroineanu (ROU) |
| 60 kg | Vera Harelikava (BLR) | Sabina Artemciuc (MDA) | Yana Kostenko (RUS) |
| 60 kg | Vera Harelikava (BLR) | Sabina Artemciuc (MDA) | Yaiza Jiménez (ESP) |
| 64 kg | Ekaterina Onoprienko (RUS) | Olena Sayko (UKR) | Anda Vâlvoi (ROU) |
| 64 kg | Ekaterina Onoprienko (RUS) | Olena Sayko (UKR) | Tatsiana Matsko (BLR) |
| 68 kg | Lucija Babić (CRO) | Kateryna Moskalova (UKR) | Marina Mokhnatkina (RUS) |
| 68 kg | Lucija Babić (CRO) | Kateryna Moskalova (UKR) | Volha Namazava (BLR) |
| 72 kg | Anzhela Zhylinskaya (BLR) | Nino Odzelashvili (GEO) | Galina Ambartsumian (RUS) |
| 72 kg | Anzhela Zhylinskaya (BLR) | Nino Odzelashvili (GEO) | Nataliya Smal (UKR) |
| 80 kg | Mariya Oryashkova (BUL) | Zhanara Kusanova (RUS) | Sviatlana Tsimashenka (BLR) |
| 80 kg | Mariya Oryashkova (BUL) | Zhanara Kusanova (RUS) | Halyna Kovalska (UKR) |
| +80 kg | Anastasiia Sapsai (UKR) | Elene Kebadze (GEO) | Alina Păunescu (ROU) |
| +80 kg | Anastasiia Sapsai (UKR) | Elene Kebadze (GEO) | Anna Balashova (RUS) |
