= Athletics at the 2019 European Games – Women's 100 metres hurdles =

Women's 100 metres hurdles at the 2019 European Games
- Venue: Dinamo Stadium, Minsk
- Date: 23 June
- Winning time: 12.89

Medalists
gold medal	Elvira Herman	Belarus
silver medal	Hanna Plotitsyna	Ukraine
bronze medal	Gréta Kerekes	Hungary

The women's 100 metres hurdles event at the 2019 European Games in Minsk took place on 23 June. The winners in this discipline were determined during the qualifications for Dynamic New Athletics.

== Results ==
Wind:
Match 1: +1.9 m/s, Match 2: 0.0 m/s, Match 3: -1.5 m/s, Match 4: +0.3 m/s

Rank	Match	Lane	Athlete	Nation	Time	Notes
1st place, gold medalist(s)	3	6	Elvira Herman	Belarus	12.89	
2nd place, silver medalist(s)	4	7	Hanna Plotitsyna	Ukraine	13.14	
3rd place, bronze medalist(s)	1	5	Gréta Kerekes	Hungary	13.16	
4	2	7	Fanny Quenot	France	13.17	
5	1	3	Franziska Hofmann	Germany	13.32 (.314)	
6	2	3	Joni Tomičić Prezelj	Slovenia	13.32 (.320)	
7	1	2	Noemi Zbären	Switzerland	13.35 (.347)	
8	2	5	Giulia Pennella	Italy	13.35 (.349)	
9	4	4	Olimpia Barbosa	Portugal	13.44	
10	3	4	Sarah Lavin	Ireland	13.46	
11	4	5	Şevval Ayaz	Turkey	13.60	
12	3	7	Helena Jiranová	Czech Republic	13.72	
13	4	6	Teresa Errandonea	Spain	13.80	SB
14	4	3	Mette Graversgaard	Denmark	13.89 (.887)	
14	2	4	Mariya Pavlova	Russia	13.89 (.887)	
16	2	6	Kreete Verlin	Estonia	13.98	
17	1	4	Natalia Christofi	Cyprus	14.01	SB
18	1	6	Kyriaki Samani	Greece	14.04	
19	3	5	Urszula Bhebhe	Poland	14.16	
20	1	7	Lucia Vadlejch	Slovakia	14.17	SB
21	4	2	Iva Aleksandrova	Bulgaria	14.22	SB
22	2	2	Anamaria Nesteriuc	Romania	14.34	SB
23	3	3	Ilona Dramačonoka	Latvia	14.70	SB
24	3	2	Rasa Mažeikaitė	Lithuania	14.93	
