= Sambo at the 2019 European Games – Women's +80 kg =

Women's +80 kg at the 2019 European Games
- Venue: Minsk Sports Palace
- Date: 22 June
- Competitors: 7 from 7 nations

Medalists
gold medal	Anastasiia Sapsai	Ukraine
silver medal	Elene Kebadze	Georgia
bronze medal	Alina Păunescu	Romania
bronze medal	Anna Balashova	Russia

The women's +80 kg sambo event at the 2019 European Games in Minsk was held on 22 June at the Minsk Sports Palace.

== Results ==
Legend

- VS – Total victory by decisive superiority
- VH – Total victory – painful hold

Quarterfinals
Alina Păunescu (ROU)	0
Katsiarina Kaliuzhnaya (BLR)	4^{VH}
Anastasiia Sapsai (UKR)	9^{VS}
Karina Stefanovič (LTU)	0
Anna Balashova (RUS)	0
Elene Kebadze (GEO)	1

Semifinals
Katsiarina Kaliuzhnaya (BLR)	0
Anastasiia Sapsai (UKR)	5
Elene Kebadze (GEO)	2
Elena Chirac (FRA)	0

Final
Anastasiia Sapsai (UKR)	4
Elene Kebadze (GEO)	0

Repechage

Repechage
Alina Păunescu (ROU)	4
Karina Stefanovič (LTU)	0

Third place
Alina Păunescu (ROU)	9^{VS}
Elena Chirac (FRA)	0

Repechage

Third place
Anna Balashova (RUS)	1^{VH}
Katsiarina Kaliuzhnaya (BLR)	0
