= Sambo at the 2019 European Games – Women's 48 kg =

Women's 48 kg at the 2019 European Games
- Venue: Minsk Sports Palace
- Date: 22 June
- Competitors: 7 from 7 nations

Medalists
| gold medal | Elena Bondareva | Russia |
| silver medal | Anastasiia Novikova | Ukraine |
| bronze medal | Anfisa Kapayeva | Belarus |
| bronze medal | Tsvetelina Tsvetanova | Bulgaria |

The women's 48 kg sambo event at the 2019 European Games in Minsk was held on 22 June at the Minsk Sports Palace.

== Results ==
Legend

- VH – Total victory – painful hold
- VQ – Total victory – contestant's disqualification

Quarterfinals
Elena Bondareva (RUS) | 1^{VH}
Milène Wojciak (FRA) | 0
Anfisa Kapayeva (BLR) | 0
Daniela Chiss (ROU) | 1^{VQ}
Anastasiia Novikova (UKR) | 2
Tsvetelina Tsvetanova (BUL) | 0

Semifinals
Elena Bondareva (RUS) | 2
Daniela Chiss (ROU) | 2
Anastasiia Novikova (UKR) | 0^{VH}
Asya Lalazaryan (ARM) | 0

Final
Elena Bondareva (RUS) | 2
Anastasiia Novikova (UKR) | 0

Repechage

Repechage
Milène Wojciak (FRA) | 0
Anfisa Kapayeva (BLR) | 1

Third place
Anfisa Kapayeva (BLR) | 1^{VH}
Asya Lalazaryan (ARM) | 0

Repechage

Third place
Tsvetelina Tsvetanova (BUL) | 3
Daniela Chiss (ROU) | 1
