= Athletics at the 2019 European Games – Mixed medley relay =

Mixed medley relay at the 2019 European Games
- Venue: Dinamo Stadium, Minsk
- Date: 23 June 2019
- Competitors: 96 from 24 nations
- Winning time: 4:25.02

Medalists
gold medal	Yevhen Hutsol, Olha Lyakhova, Oleksiy Pozdnyakov, Yana Kachur	Ukraine
silver medal	Filip Sasínek, Diana Mezuliáníková, Patrik Šorm, Marcela Pírková	Czech Republic
bronze medal	Riccardo Tamassia, Irene Baldessari, Giusepe Leonardi, Giulia Riva	Italy

The mixed medley relay event at the 2019 European Games in Minsk took place on 23 June. The winners in this discipline were determined during the qualifications for Dynamic New Athletics.

== Results ==
Rank	Match	Lane	Nation	Athletes	Net time	Notes
1st place, gold medalist(s)	4	1	Ukraine	Yevhen Hutsol, Olha Lyakhova, Oleksiy Pozdnyakov, Yana Kachur	4:25.02	
2nd place, silver medalist(s)	3	2	Czech Republic	Filip Sasínek, Diana Mezuliáníková, Patrik Šorm, Marcela Pírková	4:26.22	
3rd place, bronze medalist(s)	2	4	Italy	Riccardo Tamassia, Irene Baldessari, Giusepe Leonardi, Giulia Riva	4:29.07	
4	4	5	Denmark	Kristian Uldbjerg Hansen, Helene Gottlieb, Benjamin Lobo Vedel, Astrid Glenner-Frandsen	4:29.10	
5	1	3	Hungary	Gergő Kiss, Bianka Bartha-Kéri, Tibor Koroknai, Klaudia Sorok	4:29.50	
6	4	4	Spain	Alejandro Estévez, Zoya Naumov, Mark Ujakpor, Cristina Lara	4:29.61	
7	3	4	Lithuania	Benediktas Mickus, Eglė Balčiūnaitė, Gediminas Truskauskas, Akvilė Andriukaitytė	4:30.25	
8	3	1	Belarus	Siarhei Karpau, Marina Arzamasova, Aliaksandr Vasileuski, Krystsina Tsimanouskaya	4:30.94	
9	3	5	Latvia	Daniels Bambals, Līga Velvere, Jānis Leitis, Gunta Vaičule	4:31.36	
10	2	2	France	Hugo Houyez, Leila Boufaarirane, Patrice Maurice, Élise Trynkler	4:32.21	
11	1	2	Greece	Christos Kotitsas, Konstantina Giannopoulou, Konstantinos Nakos, Grigoria Keramida	4:32.74	
12	1	1	Germany	Oskar Schwarzer, Majtie Kolberg, Marc Koch, Pernilla Kramer	4:33.63	
13	4	3	Turkey	Levent Ateş, Semra Karaslan, İlyas Çanakçı, Mizgin Ay	4:35.45	
14	2	3	Slovenia	Žan Rudolf, Tija Ocvirk, Jure Grkman, Maja Pogorevc	4:35.81	
15	1	5	Slovakia	Alexander Jablokov, Iveta Putalová, Denis Danáč, Monika Weigertová	4:36.47	
16	2	1	Russia	Evgenii Kuntc, Valeriia Andreeva, Yegor Nikolayev, Alyona Mamina	4:36.66	
17	2	6	Estonia	Rasmus Kisel, Kelly Nevolihhin, Tony Nõu, Annika Sakkarias	4:37.07	
18	3	3	Ireland	Conall Kirk, Amy O'Donoghue, Paul White, Victoria Harris	4:37.08	
19	4	2	Portugal	Diogo Pinhão, Patrícia Silva, Mauro Pereira, Joana Carlos	4:37.84	
20	1	6	Switzerland	Michael Curti, Lisa Stöckli, Luca Flück, Laetitia Hermet	4:37.86	
21	2	5	Romania	Nicolae Coman, Florina Pierdevară, David Năstase, Ioana Gheorghe	4:39.39	
22	4	6	Bulgaria	Martin Prodanov, Polina Todorova, Mikhail Gargov, Nikol Andonova	4:39.51	
23	1	4	Cyprus	Panagiotis Michailidis, Kalliopi Kountouri, Andreas Christoforou, Olivia Fotopoulou	4:40.26	
24	3	6	Poland	Adam Czerwinski, Małgorzata Linkiewicz, Jakub Adamczyk, Ewelina Wyszczelska	4:52.53	
