= Athletics at the 2019 European Games – Women's long jump =

Sports event

Women's long jump at the 2019 European Games
- Venue: Dinamo Stadium, Minsk
- Date: 23 June
- Winning distance: 6.76

Medalists
gold medal	Yelena Sokolova	Russia
silver medal	Nastassia Mironchyk-Ivanova	Belarus
bronze medal	Maryna Bekh-Romanchuk	Ukraine

The women's long jump event at the 2019 European Games in Minsk took place on 23 June. The winners in this discipline were determined during the qualifications for Dynamic New Athletics.

== Results ==
Rank	Match	Athlete	Nation	Result	Notes
1st place, gold medalist(s)	2	Yelena Sokolova	Russia	6.76	SB
2nd place, silver medalist(s)	3	Nastassia Mironchyk-Ivanova	Belarus	6.71	
3rd place, bronze medalist(s)	4	Maryna Bekh-Romanchuk	Ukraine	6.58	
4	2	Florentina Iusco	Romania	6.44	
5	4	Evelise Veiga	Portugal	6.40	
6	2	Laura Strati	Italy	6.23	
7	1	Anasztázia Nguyen	Hungary	6.17	
8	3	Magdalena Żebrowska	Poland	6.15	
9	1	Efthymia Kolokytha	Greece	6.14	
10	3	Jogailė Petrokaitė	Lithuania	6.13	
11	3	Lauma Grīva	Latvia	6.12	
12	1	Jana Velďáková	Slovakia	6.08	
13	1	Nektaria Panagi	Cyprus	6.04	
14	2	Neja Filipič	Slovenia	5.99	
15	3	Anna Krizková	Czech Republic	5.94	
16	4	Milena Mitkova	Bulgaria	5.90	
17	2	Pauline Lett	France	5.88	
18	4	Fátima Diame	Spain	5.86	
19	1	Melanie Bauschke	Germany	5.78	SB
20	4	Tuğba Danışmaz	Turkey	5.77	
21	2	Kreete Verlin	Estonia	5.76	
22	3	Sophie Meredith	Ireland	5.74	
23	4	Janne Nielsen	Denmark	5.68	SB
24	1	Valérie Reggel	Switzerland	5.56	SB
