= Gymnastics at the 2019 European Games – Women's trampoline =

Women's trampoline at the 2019 European Games
- Venue: Minsk-Arena
- Date: 24 June
- Competitors: 23 from 15 nations
- Winning score: 54.800

Medalists
| gold medal | Léa Labrousse | France |
| silver medal | Luba Golovina | Georgia |
| bronze medal | Hanna Hancharova | Belarus |

The women's trampoline competition at the 2019 European Games was held at the Minsk-Arena on 24 June 2019.

== Qualification ==
The top six gymnasts with one per country advanced to the final.

| Rank | Gymnast | Routine 1 | Routine 2 | Total | Qual. |
|---|---|---|---|---|---|
| 1 | Yana Pavlova (RUS) | 48.450 | 56.450 | 104.900 | Q |
| 2 | Hanna Hancharova (BLR) | 48.985 | 54.115 | 103.100 | Q |
| 3 | Léa Labrousse (FRA) | 48.140 | 54.460 | 102.600 | Q |
| 4 | Maria Makharynskaya (BLR) | 48.345 | 53.890 | 102.235 | |
| 5 | Marine Jurbert (FRA) | 47.585 | 52.955 | 100.540 | |
| 6 | Romee Pol (NED) | 47.775 | 51.320 | 99.095 | Q |
| 7 | Maryna Kyiko (UKR) | 47.205 | 51.655 | 98.860 | Q |
| 8 | Luba Golovina (GEO) | 46.225 | 51.975 | 98.200 | Q |
| 9 | Beatriz Martins (POR) | 45.320 | 52.195 | 97.515 | R1 |
| 10 | Lina Sjöberg (SWE) | 45.750 | 51.130 | 96.880 | R2 |
| 11 | Isabelle Songhurst (GBR) | 47.065 | 49.805 | 96.870 | |
| 12 | Lila Kasapoglou (GRE) | 45.635 | 50.860 | 96.495 | |
| 13 | Svitlana Malkova (UKR) | 46.135 | 49.795 | 95.930 | |
| 14 | Zita Frydrychová (CZE) | 46.410 | 47.800 | 94.210 | |
| 15 | Teona Janjgava (GEO) | 42.390 | 50.180 | 92.570 | |
| 16 | Sílvia Saiote (POR) | 43.370 | 49.100 | 92.470 | |
| 17 | Costanza Michelini (ITA) | 42.485 | 48.870 | 91.355 | |
| 18 | Hristina Peneva (BUL) | 43.410 | 44.280 | 87.690 | |
| 19 | Irina Kundius (RUS) | 10.595 | 51.640 | 62.235 | |
| 20 | Cristina Sáinz (ESP) | 45.050 | 16.295 | 61.345 | |
| 21 | Fanny Chilo (SUI) | 46.420 | 5.545 | 51.965 | |
| 22 | Niamh Slattery (NED) | 45.850 | 5.320 | 51.170 | |
| 23 | Mariela Peneva (BUL) | 43.820 | 5.335 | 49.155 | |

== Final ==
| Rank | Gymnast | D Score | E Score | HD Score | ToF Score | Penalty | Total |
|---|---|---|---|---|---|---|---|
| 1st place, gold medalist(s) | Léa Labrousse (FRA) | 14.000 | 16.300 | 9.000 | 15.500 | | 54.800 |
| 2nd place, silver medalist(s) | Luba Golovina (GEO) | 14.400 | 15.100 | 9.400 | 15.090 | | 53.990 |
| 3rd place, bronze medalist(s) | Hanna Hancharova (BLR) | 13.700 | 16.200 | 8.900 | 15.170 | | 53.970 |
| 4 | Maryna Kyiko (UKR) | 14.400 | 15.100 | 9.100 | 15.305 | | 53.905 |
| 5 | Romee Pol (NED) | 13.500 | 15.600 | 9.400 | 15.360 | | 53.860 |
| 6 | Yana Pavlova (RUS) | 3.600 | 2.800 | 1.800 | 3.230 | | 11.430 |
