= Sambo at the 2019 European Games – Women's 72 kg =

Women's 72 kg at the 2019 European Games
- Venue: Minsk Sports Palace
- Date: 22 June
- Competitors: 8 from 8 nations

Medalists
gold medal	Anzhela Zhylinskaya	Belarus
silver medal	Nino Odzelashvili	Georgia
bronze medal	Galina Ambartsumian	Russia
bronze medal	Nataliya Smal	Ukraine

The women's 72 kg sambo event at the 2019 European Games in Minsk was held on 22 June at the Minsk Sports Palace.

== Results ==
Legend

- VI – Total victory by injury
- VS – Total victory by decisive superiority
- VH – Total victory – painful hold

Quarterfinals
Galina Ambartsumian (RUS)	1
Nataliya Smal (UKR)	2
Anzhela Zhylinskaya (BLR)	2
Victoria Bolohan (MDA)	0
Nino Odzelashvili (GEO)	9^{VS}
Lorena Podelenczki (ROU)	0
Gozal Zutova (AZE)	4
Camille Larose (FRA)	4

Semifinals
Nataliya Smal (UKR)	0
Anzhela Zhylinskaya (BLR)	2
Nino Odzelashvili (GEO)	8^{VS}
Camille Larose (FRA)	0

Final
Anzhela Zhylinskaya (BLR)	0^{VI}
Nino Odzelashvili (GEO)	2

Repechage

Repechage
Galina Ambartsumian (RUS)	1
Victoria Bolohan (MDA)	1

Third place
Galina Ambartsumian (RUS)	4^{VH}
Camille Larose (FRA)	0

Repechage
Lorena Podelenczki (ROU)	8^{VS}
Gozal Zutova (AZE)	0

Third place
Lorena Podelenczki (ROU)	0
Nataliya Smal (UKR)	4^{VH}
