= Gymnastics at the 2019 European Games – Men's pommel horse =

Men's pommel horse at the 2019 European Games
- Venue: Minsk-Arena
- Date: 30 June
- Competitors: 6 from 6 nations
- Winning score: 15.033

Medalists
gold medal	David Belyavskiy	Russia
silver medal	Oleg Verniaiev	Ukraine
bronze medal	Andrey Likhovitskiy	Belarus

The men's artistic gymnastics pommel horse competition at the 2019 European Games was held at the Minsk-Arena on 30 June 2019.

== Qualification ==
The top six gymnasts with one per country advanced to the final.

Rank	Gymnast	D Score	E Score	Pen.	Total	Qual.
1	Oleg Verniaiev (UKR)	6.500	8.633		15.133	Q
2	Cyril Tommasone (FRA)	6.300	8.800		15.100	Q
3	David Belyavskiy (RUS)	6.100	8.533		14.633	Q
4	Marios Georgiou (CYP)	5.900	8.600		14.500	Q
4	Andrey Likhovitskiy (BLR)	5.900	8.600		14.500	Q
6	Slavomír Michňák (SVK)	5.900	8.500		14.400	Q
7	Artur Davtyan (ARM)	5.900	8.233		14.133	R1
8	Ahmet Onder (TUR)	5.400	8.600		14.000	R2
9	Artem Dolgopyat (ISR)	5.600	8.300		13.900	R3

== Final ==
Rank	Gymnast	D Score	E Score	Pen.	Total
1st place, gold medalist(s)	David Belyavskiy (RUS)	6.400	8.633		15.033
2nd place, silver medalist(s)	Oleg Verniaiev (UKR)	6.200	8.700		14.900
3rd place, bronze medalist(s)	Andrey Likhovitskiy (BLR)	5.900	8.666		14.566
4	Cyril Tommasone (FRA)	6.400	6.866		13.266
5	Marios Georgiou (CYP)	6.100	7.066		13.166
6	Slavomír Michňák (SVK)	4.900	7.066		11.966
