= Gymnastics at the 2019 European Games – Men's artistic individual all-around =

Men's artistic individual all-around at the 2019 European Games
- Venue: Minsk-Arena
- Date: 29 June
- Competitors: 18 from 14 nations
- Winning score: 85.465

Medalists
gold medal	David Belyavskiy	Russia
silver medal	Oleg Verniaiev	Ukraine
bronze medal	Vladislav Polyashov	Russia

The men's artistic gymnastics all-around final at the 2019 European Games was held at the Minsk-Arena on 29 June.

== Qualification ==
Qualification took place on 27 June. David Belyavskiy from Russia qualified in first, followed by Armenia's Artur Davtyan and Robert Tvorogal of Lithuania.

The reserves were:

1. Adam Steele (IRL)
2. Jake Jarman (GBR)
3. Oskar Kirmes (FIN)

== Results ==
Oldest and youngest competitors

	Name	Country	Date of birth	Age
Youngest	Nicolò Mozzato	Italy	March 13, 2000	19 years, 3 months and 16 days
Oldest	Petro Pakhniuk	Ukraine	November 26, 1991	27 years, 7 months and 3 days

Rank	Gymnast	Floor (gymnastics)	Pommel horse	Rings (gymnastics)	Vault (gymnastics)	Parallel bars	Horizontal bar	Total
1st place, gold medalist(s)	David Belyavskiy (RUS)	13.300	14.233	13.933	14.533	15.433	14.033	85.465
2nd place, silver medalist(s)	Oleg Verniaiev (UKR)	14.000	14.800	12.533	14.766	15.100	13.433	84.632
3rd place, bronze medalist(s)	Vladislav Polyashov (RUS)	14.366	13.266	13.433	14.233	15.133	14.033	84.464
4	Petro Pakhniuk (UKR)	13.366	13.933	13.466	14.733	15.033	13.500	84.031
5	Artur Davtyan (ARM)	13.800	14.400	13.966	14.100	14.000	13.366	83.632
6	Néstor Abad (ESP)	14.400	12.033	13.800	13.966	14.066	14.266	82.531
7	Robert Tvorogal (LTU)	14.100	13.333	13.366	14.233	14.333	12.266	81.631
8	Loris Frasca (FRA)	14.233	13.633	13.233	14.200	13.200	12.866	81.365
9	Ferhat Arıcan (TUR)	13.166	13.133	13.200	14.300	14.800	12.666	81.265
10	Nikolaos Iliopoulos (GRE)	12.866	12.966	13.333	14.133	14.066	13.766	81.130
11	Marco Pfyl (SUI)	14.100	13.133	13.033	14.133	12.833	13.366	80.598
12	Joel Plata (ESP)	13.733	13.100	12.966	13.933	14.000	12.866	80.598
13	Giarnni Regini-Moran (GBR)	13.966	11.366	12.733	14.700	14.166	13.333	80.264
14	Ivan Tikhonov (AZE)	14.233	13.666	12.766	14.666	12.933	11.966	80.230
15	Nicolò Mozzato (ITA)	13.400	12.800	13.066	14.333	12.566	12.933	79.098
16	Jimmy Verbaeys (BEL)	13.733	13.100	11.966	13.766	13.466	12.400	78.431
17	Moreno Kratter (SUI)	13.533	11.766	13.000	13.800	12.300	13.900	78.299
18	Marios Georgiou (CYP)	13.766	14.666	13.333	13.933	13.966	6.500	76.164
