= Robert Tvorogal =

Polish-Lithuanian artistic gymnast

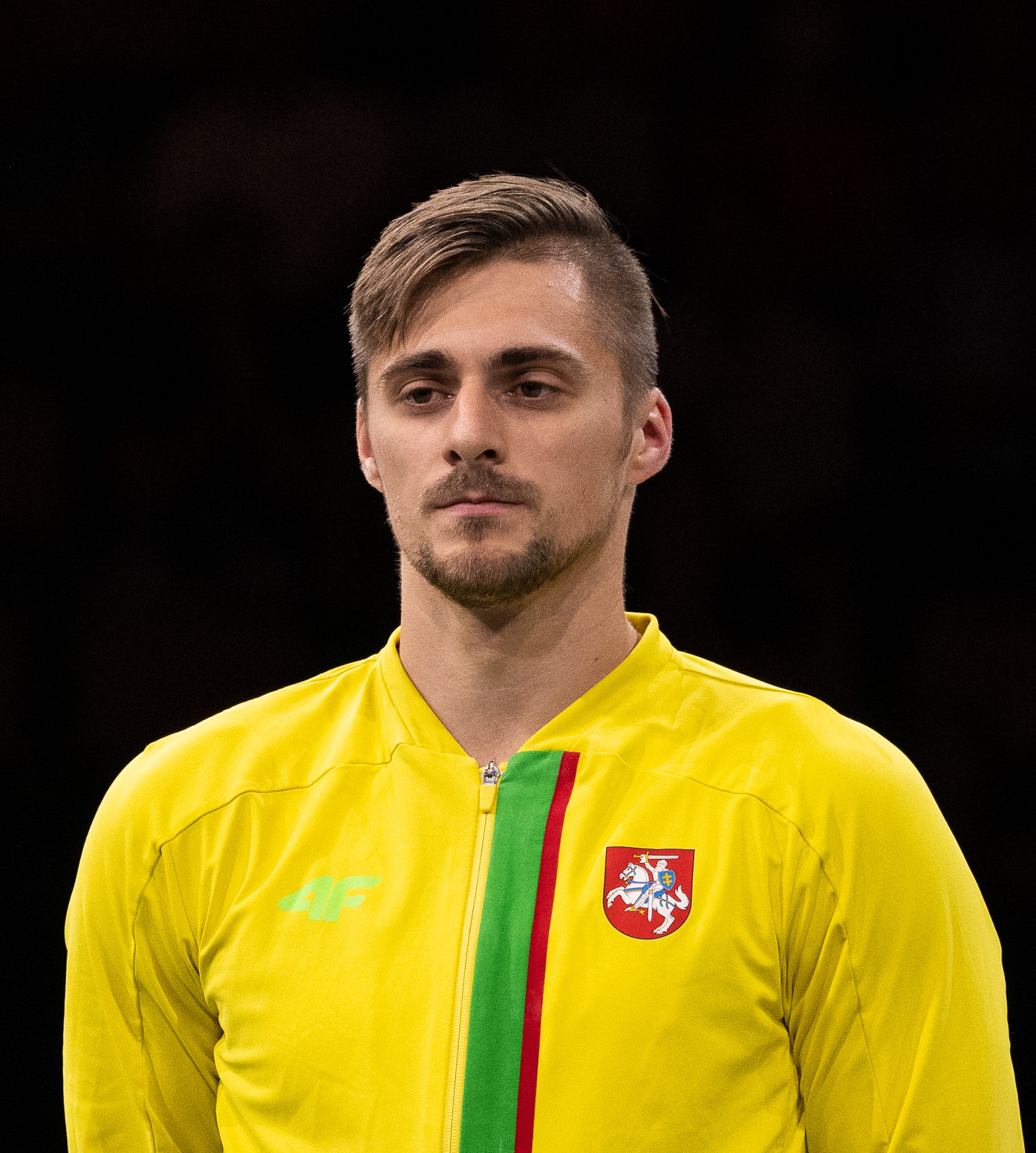
- Tvorogal at the 2022 European Championships

Personal information
- Born: 5 October 1994 (age 32) Vilnius, Lithuania
- Height: 168 cm (5 ft 6 in)

Gymnastics career
- Discipline: Men's artistic gymnastics
- Country represented: Lithuania
- Club: Stars Gimnastikos Klubas
- Head coach: Jevgenij Izmodenov
Medal record
Representing Lithuania
Men's artistic gymnastics
European Games
Gold medal – first place	2019 Minsk	Horizontal bar
European Championships
Gold medal – first place	2020 Mersin	Horizontal bar
Gold medal – first place	2025 Leipzig	Horizontal bar
Silver medal – second place	2022 Munich	Horizontal bar
Silver medal – second place	2024 Rimini	Horizontal bar
Bronze medal – third place	2020 Mersin	Parallel bars
FIG World Cup
Event	1st	2nd	3rd
World Cup	1	3	2
World Challenge Cup	3	2	3
Total	4	5	5

Robert Tvorogal (Polish: Robert Tworogal; born 5 October 1994) is a Lithuanian artistic gymnast of Polish ethnicity. He is the 2019 European Games champion on the horizontal bar. He became the first Lithuanian to win a gold medal at the European Artistic Gymnastics Championships when he won the horizontal bar title at the 2020 European Championships. He is also the 2022 European horizontal bar silver medalist and the 2020 European parallel bars bronze medalist. He represented Lithuania at the 2016, 2020, and 2024 Olympic Games.

== Early life ==
Tvorogal was born on 5 October 1994 in Vilnius. He is ethnic Polish and graduated from the Szymon Konarski Polish Secondary School. He began gymnastics when he was five years old.

== Career ==
=== Junior ===
Tvorogal competed at the 2010 Junior European Championships and finished eighth in the horizontal bar final. He represented Lithuania at the 2010 Summer Youth Olympics in Singapore. He qualified for the horizontal bar final where he finished seventh. He won the silver medal on the horizontal bar at the 2011 European Youth Summer Olympic Festival behind Switzerland's Christian Baumann. He finished fourth in the all-around at the 2012 Junior European Championships by only 0.150 behind bronze medalist Eddy Yusof.

=== 2013 ===
Tvorogal competed at his first World Championships in 2013 but did not advance to any finals. He also did not advance to any finals at the 2014 World Championships in Nanning.

=== 2015–16 ===
Tvorogal finished 58th in the all-around during the qualification round of the 2015 World Championships. Although he did not advance to any finals, he qualified for a spot at the 2016 Olympic Test Event. At the Test Event, he finished 33rd in the all-around and qualified for the 2016 Olympic Games. In May 2016, he competed at the Varna World Challenge Cup and won the silver medal on horizontal bar behind Andrey Likhavitski. At the 2016 Olympic Games, he finished 42nd in the all-around during the qualification round.

=== 2017–18 ===
Tvorogal finished 20th in the all-around final at the 2017 European Championships. He then represented Lithuania at the 2017 Summer Universiade and qualified for the all-around final where he finished tenth. At the 2017 World Championships in Montreal, he finished 17th in the all-around final.

Tvorogal competed at the 2018 Melbourne World Cup and won the bronze medal on the floor exercise. He then won the silver medal on the horizontal bar at the 2018 Osijek World Challenge Cup behind Croatia's Tin Srbić.

=== 2019–20 ===
Tvorogal competed at the 2019 European Championships and finished 16th in the all-around final. He then won the gold medal on the parallel bars at the 2019 Osijek World Challenge Cup. He represented Lithuania at the 2019 European Games in Minsk. In the all-around final, he finished seventh, and he finished fifth in the parallel bars final. He won the gold medal in the horizontal bar final with a score of 14.400. At the 2019 World Championships in Stuttgart, he finished 29th in the all-around during the qualification round and qualified for the 2020 Olympic Games. This result also made him the second reserve for the all-around final. However, after Kim Han-sol and Manrique Larduet both withdrew from the final, Tvorogal was added to the start list and finished 24th.

Tvorogal competed at the 2020 European Championships in Mersin. The Lithuanian team finished eighth in the qualification round, making them the second reserve for the final. In the parallel bars final, he scored 14.500 and won the bronze medal behind Ferhat Arıcan and Petro Pakhniuk. Then in the horizontal bar final, he won the gold medal with a score of 14.800. He became the first Lithuanian gymnast to win a gold medal at the European Championships.

=== 2021–22 ===
At the 2021 European Championships, Tvorogal finished sixth in the all-around final. He won the bronze medal on the parallel bars at the 2021 Varna World Challenge Cup. He then won the gold medal on the parallel bars and the bronze medal on the horizontal bar at the Cairo World Challenge Cup. He the represented Lithuania at the postponed 2020 Olympics in Tokyo. In the qualification round, he fell off the horizontal bar. He did not qualify for any finals, finishing 46th in the all-around. After the Olympics, he competed at the Mersin World Challenge Cup where he won the bronze medal on the horizontal bar. He then competed at the 2021 World Championships and finished fifteenth in the all-around final.

Tvorogal won the silver medal on the horizontal bar behind Alexander Myakinin at 2022 Doha World Cup. He then represented Lithuania at the 2022 European Championships in Munich. In the horizontal bar final, he scored 14.000 and won the silver medal behind Marios Georgiou. At the 2022 Mersin World Challenge Cup, he won the gold medal on the horizontal bar and the silver medal on the parallel bars. He finished eleventh on the horizontal bar at the 2022 World Championships, making him the third reserve for the event final.

=== 2023–24 ===
Tvorogal began the 2023 season with an all-around win at the Luxembourg Open. He finished sixth in the horizontal bar final at the 2023 European Championships. He finished 67th in the all-around during the qualification round at the 2023 World Championships, missing out on an Olympic berth.

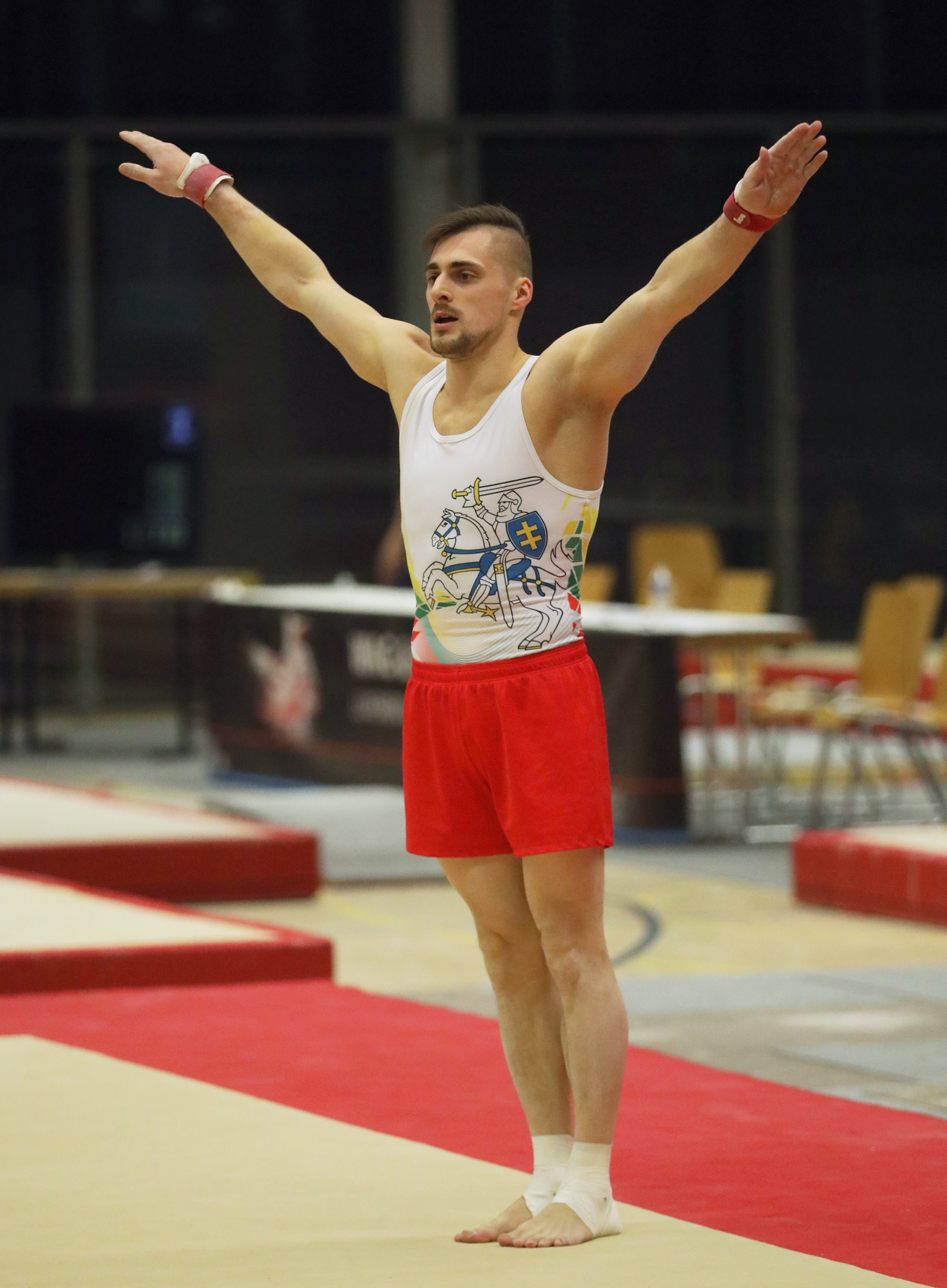
Floor exercise

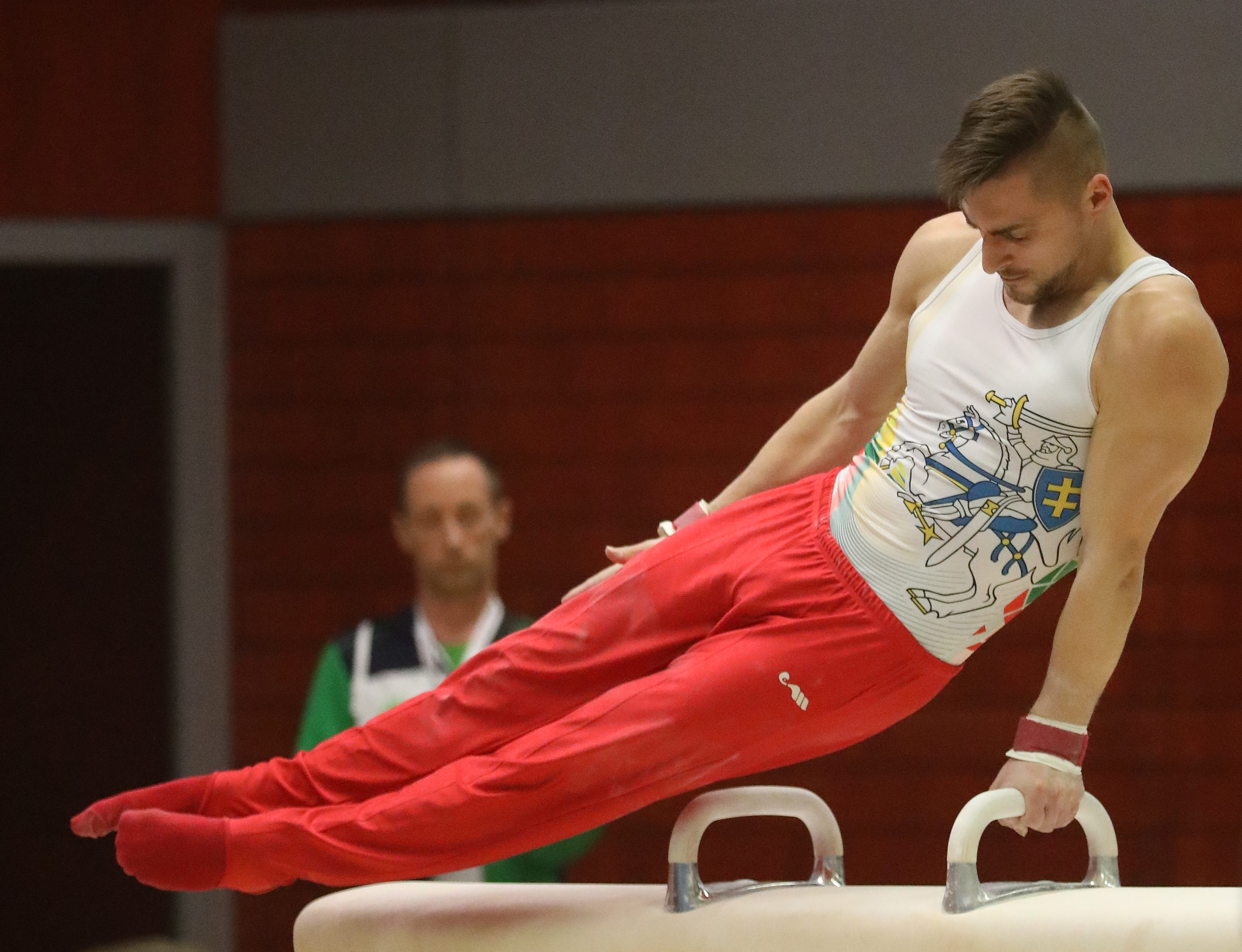
Pommel horse

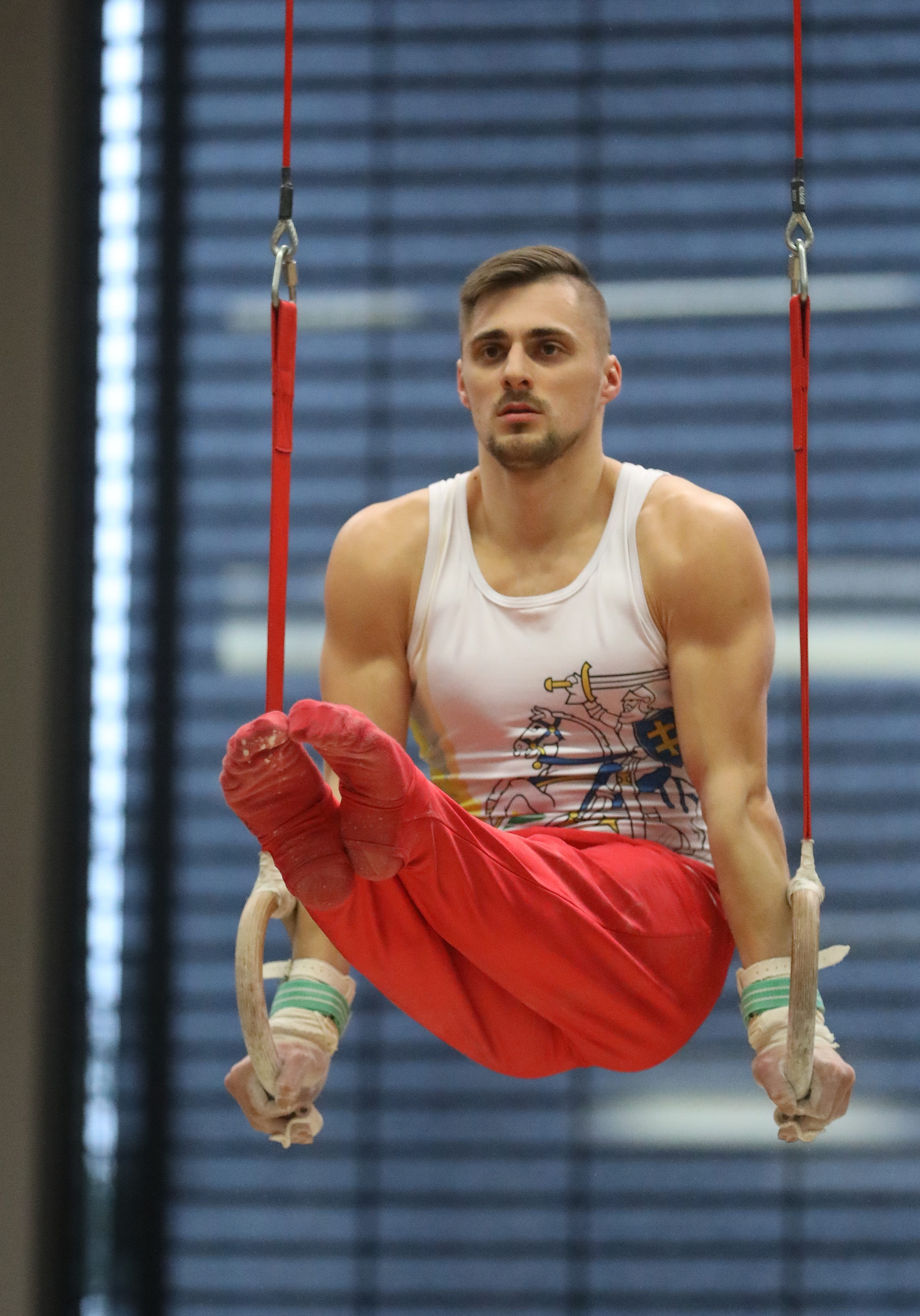
Still rings

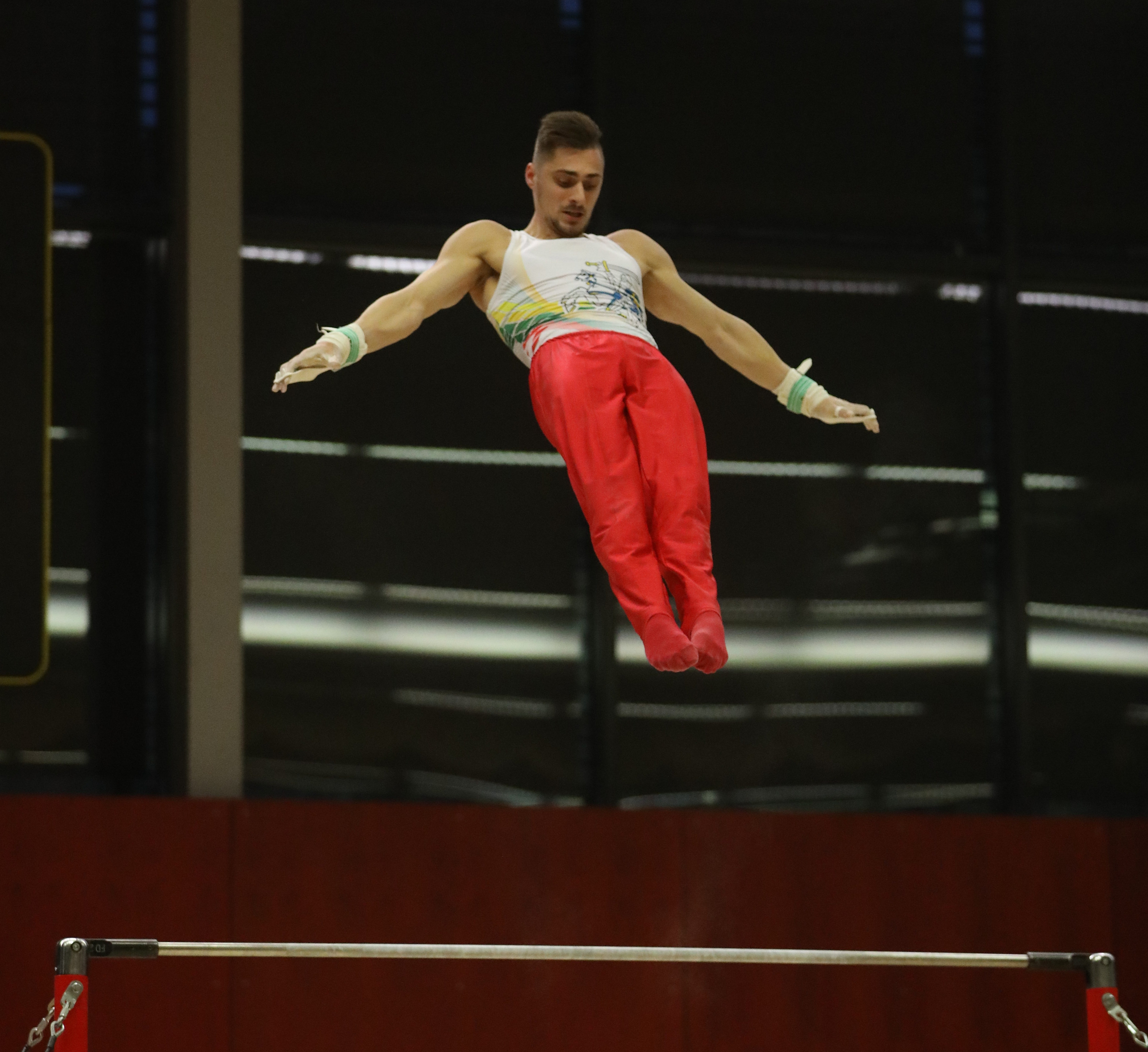
Horizontal bar

Tvorogal at the 2023 Luxembourg Open

Tvorogal registered for the 2024 FIG World Cup series to earn points for Olympic qualification. He placed fifth on the horizontal bar at the first event in Cairo. He improved his performance to win a bronze medal at the second event in Cottbus. He then won the gold medal at the World Cup in Baku. At the final event in Doha, he won a silver medal behind Tang Chia-hung. With these results, he earned enough points for qualify for the 2024 Summer Olympics.

At the 2024 European Championships, Tvorogal won a silver medal on the horizontal bar behind Illia Kovtun.
