= Cycling at the 2019 European Games – Women's points race =

Women's points race at the 2019 European Games
- Venue: Minsk Velodrome
- Date: 27 June
- Competitors: 17 from 17 nations
- Winning points: 30

Medalists
gold medal	Hanna Solovey	Ukraine
silver medal	Verena Eberhardt	Austria
bronze medal	Jarmila Machačová	Czech Republic

The women's points race at the 2019 European Games was held at the Minsk Velodrome on 27 June 2019.

== Results ==
100 laps (25 km) were raced with 10 sprints.

Rank	Name	Nation	Sprint										Laps		Total	Finish order
Rank	Name	Nation	1	2	3	4	5	6	7	8	9	10	+	−	Total	Finish order
1st place, gold medalist(s)	Hanna Solovey	Ukraine					5			5			20		30	6
2nd place, silver medalist(s)	Verena Eberhardt	Austria		2	5								20		27	5
3rd place, bronze medalist(s)	Jarmila Machačová	Czech Republic			3					2			20		25	14
4	Ina Savenka	Belarus	5			1				3	5	10			24	1
5	Kirsten Wild	Netherlands	2		2	2	2	5	2	1	3				19	11
6	Letizia Paternoster	Italy	1		1			3	5		2	2			14	4
7	Anita Stenberg	Norway	3				3					6			12	2
8	Nikol Płosaj	Poland		3			1		3		1				8	7
9	Maria Martins	Portugal				5		2							7	12
10	Gulnaz Badykova	Russia		1		3		1	1						6	10
11	Lydia Boylan	Ireland		5											5	9
12	Anna Docherty	Great Britain										4			4	3
13	Tereza Medveďová	Slovakia													0	8
14	Ana Usabiaga	Spain													0	15
15	Michelle Andres	Switzerland												20	−20	13
16	Gilke Croket	Belgium												20	−20	16
	Viktorija Šumskytė	Lithuania												20		DNF
