= Gymnastics at the 2019 European Games – Men's parallel bars =

Men's parallel bars at the 2019 European Games
- Venue: Minsk-Arena
- Date: 30 June
- Competitors: 6 from 6 nations
- Winning score: 15.333

Medalists
gold medal	Oleg Verniaiev	Ukraine
silver medal	Marios Georgiou	Cyprus
bronze medal	Ferhat Arıcan	Turkey

The men's artistic gymnastics parallel bars competition at the 2019 European Games was held at the Minsk-Arena on 30 June 2019.

== Qualification ==
The top six gymnasts with one per country advanced to the final.

Rank	Gymnast	D Score	E Score	Pen.	Total	Qual.
1	David Belyavskiy (RUS)	6.600	8.600		15.200	Q
2	Vladislav Polyashov (RUS)	6.500	8.633		15.133	
3	Ferhat Arıcan (TUR)	6.300	8.733		15.033	Q
4	Brinn Bevan (GBR)	6.200	8.666		14.866	Q
4	Ahmet Önder (TUR)	6.200	8.666		14.866	
6	Oleg Verniaiev (UKR)	6.300	8.433		14.733	Q
7	Marios Georgiou (CYP)	6.000	8.700		14.700	Q
8	Robert Tvorogal (LTU)	5.600	8.966		14.566	Q
9	Andrey Likhovitskiy (BLR)	5.500	9.000		14.500	R1
10	Nicolò Mozzato (ITA)	5.500	8.600		14.100	R2
11	Néstor Abad (ESP)	5.600	8.466		14.066	R3

== Final ==
Rank	Gymnast	D Score	E Score	Pen.	Total
1st place, gold medalist(s)	Oleg Verniaiev (UKR)	6.700	8.633		15.333
2nd place, silver medalist(s)	Marios Georgiou (CYP)	6.000	8.900		14.900
3rd place, bronze medalist(s)	Ferhat Arıcan (TUR)	6.300	8.533		14.833
4	David Belyavskiy (RUS)	6.600	8.133		14.733
5	Robert Tvorogal (LTU)	5.600	8.600		14.200
6	Brinn Bevan (GBR)	6.200	7.500		13.700
