= Gymnastics at the 2019 European Games – Women's balance beam =

The women's artistic gymnastics balance beam final at the 2019 European Games was held at the Minsk Arena on June 30.

== Qualification ==
Qualification took place on June 27. Nina Derwael from Belgium qualified in first, followed by France's Lorette Charpy and Angelina Melnikova of Russia.

The reserves were:

1. Adela Šajn (SLO)
2. Aneta Holasová (CZE)
3. Anastasiya Alistratava (BLR)

== Medalists ==
	Gold	Silver	Bronze
Balance beam	Nina Derwael (BEL)	Angelina Melnikova (RUS)	Diana Varinska (UKR)

== Results ==
Oldest and youngest competitors

	Name	Country	Date of birth	Age
Youngest	Denisa Golgotă	Romania	March 8, 2002	17 years, 3 months and 22 days
Oldest	Nina Derwael	Belgium	March 26, 2000	19 years, 3 months and 4 days

Rank	Gymnast	D Score	E Score	Pen.	Total
1st place, gold medalist(s)	Nina Derwael (BEL)	5.300	8.466		13.766
2nd place, silver medalist(s)	Angelina Melnikova (RUS)	5.300	8.300		13.600
3rd place, bronze medalist(s)	Diana Varinska (UKR)	5.200	7.900		13.100
4	Denisa Golgotă (ROU)	5.200	7.733		12.933
5	Georgia-Mae Fenton (GBR)	5.200	7.600		12.800
6	Lorette Charpy (FRA)	5.600	5.966		11.566
