= Hanna Haponova =

Ukrainian table tennis player

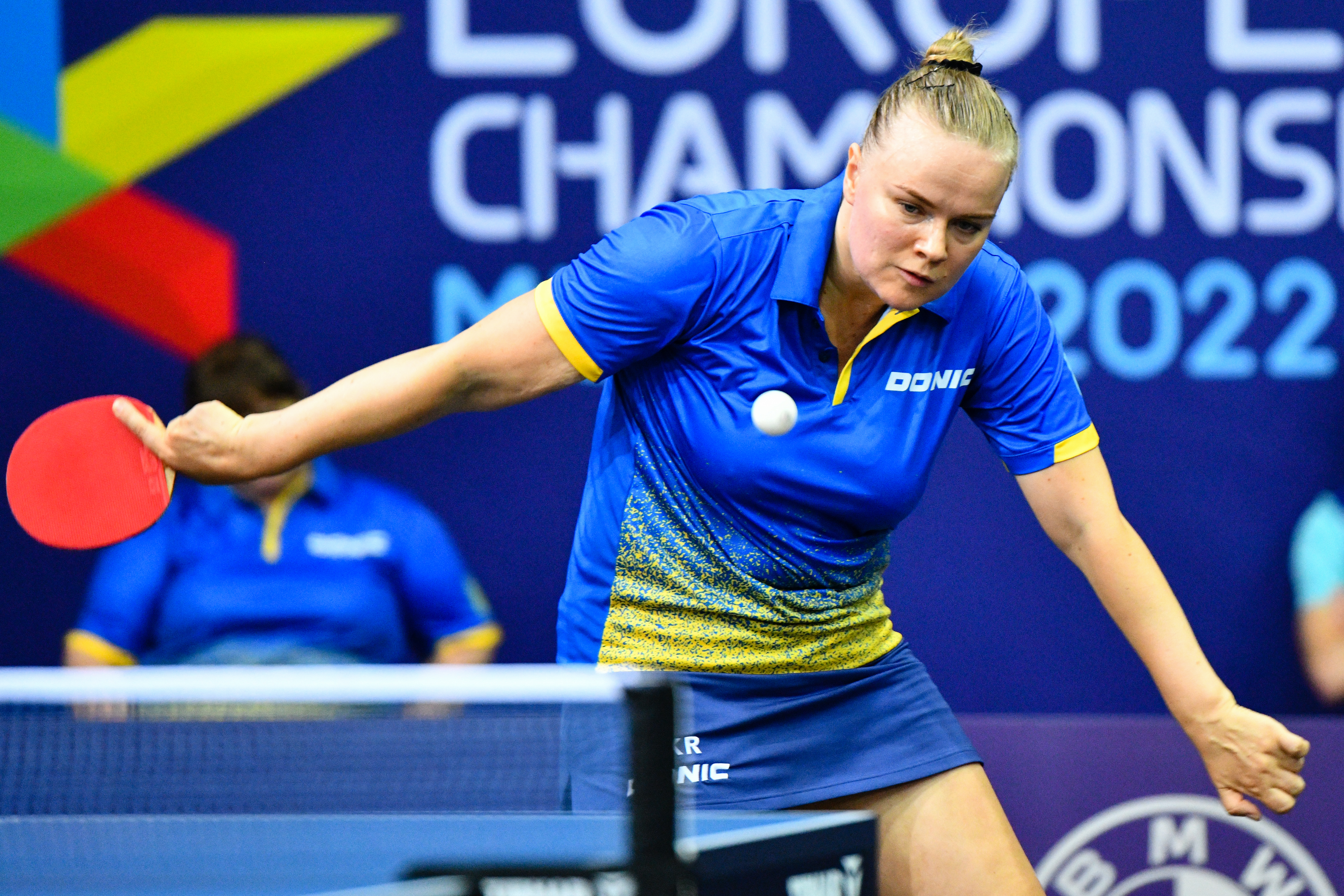

Personal information
- Nationality: Ukraine
- Born: 28 October 1985 (age 40) Kharkiv, Ukrainian SSR, Soviet Union
- Height: 1.69 m (5 ft 7 in)
- Weight: 65 kg (143 lb)

Sport
- Sport: Table tennis
Medal record
Women's table tennis
Representing Ukraine
European Championships
Bronze medal – third place	2015 Yekaterinburg	Team
Bronze medal – third place	2020 Warsaw	Doubles

Hanna Haponova (in statistics also Ganna Gaponova, Ukrainian: Ганна Гапонова; born 28 October 1985) is a Ukrainian table tennis player who has competed at the 2020 Summer Olympics where she was relegated in the Round 1 by Austrian Liu Jia.

Haponova won bronze medal in team competition at the 2015 European Championships (in team with Margaryta Pesotska and Tetyana Bilenko) and another bronze in doubles competition at the 2020 European Championships (together with Bilenko) which was Ukraine's first continental medal in women's doubles.
