= Athletics at the 2019 European Games =

Sport in Minsk (Belarus) of 2019

- Venue: Dinamo Stadium
- Dates: 23–28 June 2019
- Competitors: 413 from 24 nations

Athletics at the 2019 European Games took place at the Dinamo Stadium, Minsk, Belarus between 23 and 28 June 2019. For the first time in an international event, a new competition format called Dynamic New Athletics (DNA) was contested.

== Qualification ==
The qualification list was based on the results from the 2017 European Team Championships. The top 30 teams will qualify, with each team consisting of 23 male and female athletes, including reserves.

- Germany
- Poland
- France
- Great Britain
- Spain
- Ukraine
- Italy
- Czech Republic
- Greece
- Sweden
- Finland
- Switzerland
- Belarus (host)
- Netherlands
- Russia
- Turkey
- Portugal
- Norway
- Romania
- Belgium
- Ireland
- Hungary
- Slovakia
- Lithuania
- Estonia
- Bulgaria
- Denmark
- Slovenia
- Latvia
- Cyprus

On 23 April, the Organising Committee announced that the DNA programme would involve 24 of the thirty teams, the other six having indicated they did not wish to take part. The absenting nations were:

- Great Britain
- Sweden
- Finland
- Netherlands
- Norway
- Belgium

== Medal summary ==
=== Medal table ===
* Host nation (Belarus)

Rank	Nation	Gold	Silver	Bronze	Total
1	Belarus*	3	3	0	6
2	Ukraine	3	1	2	6
3	Russia	1	3	0	4
4	Italy	1	0	1	2
4	Portugal	1	0	1	2
6	Slovenia	1	0	0	1
7	Czech Republic	0	2	0	2
8	Slovakia	0	1	0	1
9	Greece	0	0	2	2
10	Germany	0	0	1	1
10	Hungary	0	0	1	1
10	Latvia	0	0	1	1
10	Turkey	0	0	1	1
Totals (13 entries)		10	10	10	30

=== Medalists ===
Event	Gold	Silver	Bronze
Team event	Ukraine; Maryna Bekh-Romanchuk; Bohdan Bondarenko; Bohdan Chornomaz; Danylo Danylenko; Hanna Hatsko-Fedusova; Yevhen Hutsol; Yana Kachur; Alina Lohvynenko; Olha Lyakhova; Tetyana Melnyk; Oleh Myronets; Hanna Plotitsyna; Oleksiy Pozdnyakov; Nataliya Pryshchepa; Andriy Protsenko; Anna Ryzhykova; Stanislav Senyk; Artem Shamatrin; Serhiy Smelyk; Hrystyna Stuy; Krystyna Hryshutyna	Belarus; Marina Arzamasova; Daryia Barysevich; Stanislau Darahakupets; Elvira Herman; Maksim Hrabarenka; Siarhei Karpau; Yuliya Kastsiuchkova; Tatsiana Khaladovich; Aliaksei Lazarau; Marina Mikhan; Nastassia Mironchyk-Ivanova; Krystsina Muliarchyk; Maksim Nedasekau; Vitali Parakhonka; Andrei Skabeika; Yan Sloma; Krystsina Tsimanouskaya; Aliaksandr Vasileuski; Ihar Zubko; Ruslana Rashkavan; Viyaleta Skvartsova	Germany; Melanie Bauschke; Maximilian Bayer; Annika Fuchs; Maximilian Grupen; Franziska Hofmann; Christoph Kessler; Marc Koch; Majtie Kolberg; Pernilla Kramer; Arne Leppelsack; Sina Mayer; Karolina Pahlitzsch; Michael Pohl; Corinna Schwab; Oskar Schwarzer; Johannes Trefz; Falk Wendrich; Viktoria Dönicke; Julia Gerter; Tobias Potye; Sarah Schmidt
Men's 100 metres	Carlos Nascimento; Portugal	Ján Volko; Slovakia	Jak Ali Harvey; Turkey
Men's 110 metres hurdles	Hassane Fofana; Italy	Vital Parakhonka; Belarus	Konstadinos Douvalidis; Greece
Men's high jump	Maksim Nedasekau; Belarus	Ilya Ivanyuk; Russia	Bohdan Bondarenko; Ukraine
Women's 100 metres	Maja Mihalinec; Slovenia	Krystsina Tsimanouskaya; Belarus	Rafailía Spanoudaki-Hatziriga; Greece
Women's 100 metres hurdles	Elvira Herman; Belarus	Hanna Plotitsyna; Ukraine	Gréta Kerekes; Hungary
Women's long jump	Yelena Sokolova; Russia	Nastassia Mironchyk-Ivanova; Belarus	Maryna Bekh-Romanchuk; Ukraine
Women's javelin throw	Tatsiana Khaladovich; Belarus	Yekaterina Starygina; Russia	Madara Palameika; Latvia
Mixed 4 x 400 metres relay	Ukraine; Danylo Danylenko; Tetyana Melnyk; Stanislav Senyk; Anna Ryzhykova	Czech Republic; Jan Tesař; Barbora Malíková; Lada Vondrová; Michal Desenský	Portugal; Ricardo dos Santos; Cátia Azevedo; Rivinilda Mentai; João Coelho
Mixed medley relay	Ukraine; Yevhen Hutsol; Olha Lyakhova; Oleksiy Pozdnyakov; Yana Kachur	Czech Republic; Filip Sasínek; Diana Mezuliáníková; Patrik Šorm; Marcela Pírková	Italy; Riccardo Tamassia; Irene Baldessari; Giuseppe Leonardi; Giulia Riva
