= Luba Golovina =

Georgian trampoline gymnast

- Full name: Lyubov Vladimirovna Golovina
- Born: April 20, 1990 (age 36) Tbilisi, Georgian SSR, Soviet Union
- Height: 172 cm (5 ft 8 in)

Gymnastics career
- Discipline: Trampoline gymnastics
- Country represented: Georgia
- Head coaches: Vladimir Golovin, Lyudmila Golovina
Medal record
Women's trampoline gymnastics
Representing Georgia
World Championships
Bronze medal – third place	2023 Birmingham	Individual team
European Championships
Silver medal – second place	2022 Rimini	Individual
Silver medal – second place	2022 Rimini	Individual team
Silver medal – second place	2024 Guimarães	Individual team
European Games
Silver medal – second place	2019 Minsk	Individual

Lyubov "Luba" Vladimirovna Golovina (Russian: Любовь Владимировна Головина, Georgian: ლიუბოვ ვლადიმერის ასული გოლოვინა; born 20 April 1990) is a Georgian trampoline gymnast. She has represented Georgia at four Olympic Games (2008, 2012, 2016, 2024). She is the 2019 European Games and 2022 European Championships individual silver medalist. She also won a team bronze medal at the 2023 World Championships and team silver medals at the 2022 and 2024 European Championships.

== Gymnastics career ==
Golovina began trampoline gymnastics at the age of three, with her parents as her coaches.

Golovina qualified for the trampoline final at the 2008 Summer Olympics, finishing in sixth place. She also qualified for the individual final at the 2010 World Championships but finished last after falling during her third jump. At the 2011 World Championships, she finished 18th in the qualification round.

Golovina finished eighth at the 2012 Olympic Test Event and qualified for the 2012 Summer Olympics. Despite competing with a major back injury, she placed seventh in the final at her second Olympic Games. She did not qualify for the final at the 2013 World Championships, finishing 32nd.

Golovina finished eighth in the individual final at the 2015 World Championships and qualified for the 2016 Summer Olympics. She was injured while competing at the 2016 European Championships. She used money from an International Gymnastics Federation (FIG) scholarship to receive treatment in Turkey and was able to compete at the 2016 Summer Olympics. There, she once again placed seventh in the trampoline final.

Golovina won the individual silver medal at the 2019 European Games held in Minsk, behind Léa Labrousse.

Golovina was not able to train for nine months due to the COVID-19 pandemic. She finished fourth at the 2021 European Championships. She qualified for the final in third place at the 2021 Anadia World Cup, but she made mistakes in the final and only placed seventh.

Golovina helped the Georgian team win the silver medal at the 2022 European Championships. She also won a silver medal in the individual event behind Bryony Page.

Golovina won a bronze medal with the Georgian team at the 2023 World Championships, marking the first time Georgia won a medal at the Trampoline World Championships.

Golovina won a silver medal with the Georgian team at the 2024 European Championships. She qualified for the 2024 Summer Olympics through her results on the 2024 FIG World Cup series. At the age of 34, Golovina represented Georgia at the 2024 Summer Olympics, making her the oldest competitor in the trampoline event, men's or women's. She finished in 11th place in the qualification round, missing out on the final.

== Personal life ==
Golovina is married to a former football player and gave birth to their son, Alexander, in 2014.
