= Nataliya Smal =

Ukrainian judoka and sambo practitioner

Personal information
- Born: Смаль Наталія; 10 March 1983 (age 43) Koriukivka Raion, Ukrainian SSR, Soviet Union
- Occupation(s): Judoka, Sambist

Sport
- Country: Ukraine
- Sport: Judo, Sambo
- Weight class: ‍–‍70 kg

Achievements and titles
- Olympic Games: 9th (2008)
- World Champ.: R16 (2009, 2011)
- European Champ.: 7th (2009)
Medal record
Representing Ukraine
Women's judo
European Championships
Bronze medal – third place	2010 Vienna	Women's team
Bronze medal – third place	2011 Istanbul	Women's team
IJF Grand Prix
Silver medal – second place	2011 Amsterdam	‍–‍70 kg
European U23 Championships
Silver medal – second place	2005 Kyiv	‍–‍78 kg
Women's sambo
World Championships
Gold medal – first place	2007 Prague	‍–‍80 kg
Gold medal – first place	2015 Casablanca	‍–‍72 kg
Gold medal – first place	2016 Sofia	‍–‍72 kg
Bronze medal – third place	2003 Vladivostok	‍–‍68 kg
Bronze medal – third place	2004 Chișinău	‍–‍68 kg
Bronze medal – third place	2008 Saint Petersburg	‍–‍72 kg
Bronze medal – third place	2014 Narita	‍–‍80 kg
Bronze medal – third place	2018 Bucharest	‍–‍72 kg
European Games
Bronze medal – third place	2019 Minsk	‍–‍72 kg
European Championships
Gold medal – first place	2003 Albena	‍–‍68 kg
Gold medal – first place	2004 Siauliai	‍–‍68 kg
Gold medal – first place	2005 Moscow	‍–‍72 kg
Gold medal – first place	2015 Zagreb	‍–‍72 kg
Gold medal – first place	2018 Athens	‍–‍72 kg
Silver medal – second place	2002 Kuneo	‍–‍68 kg
Silver medal – second place	2007 Pravec	‍–‍72 kg
Silver medal – second place	2016 Kazan	‍–‍72 kg
Bronze medal – third place	2006 Belgrade	‍–‍72 kg
Bronze medal – third place	2017 Minsk	‍–‍72 kg

Profile at external databases
- IJF: 553
- JudoInside.com: 26920

Nataliya Nikolayevna Smal (Ukrainian: Наталія Николаевна Смаль; born 10 March 1983 in Koriukivka Raion, Ukraine) is a Ukrainian judoka and sambist. She competed in the 70 kg event at the 2008 Summer Olympics, where she lost in the third round to Annett Böhm, and the 2012 Summer Olympics where she lost in the first round to Cecilia Blanco.
