= Oleksiy Pozdnyakov =

Ukrainian male athlete

Personal information
- Born: 1 April 1995 (age 31) Pryluky, Ukraine
- Height: 1.77 m (5 ft 10 in)
- Weight: 66 kg (146 lb)

Sport
- Sport: Athletics
- Event(s): 200 metres, 400 metres
- Coached by: Mykhailo Marchenko, Olha Zavhorodnya
Medal record
European Games
| Gold medal – first place | 2019 Minsk | Team event |
| Gold medal – first place | 2019 Minsk | Mixed medley relay |

Oleksiy Pozdnyakov (Ukrainian: Олексій Олександрович Поздняков; born 1 April 1995 in Pryluky, Ukraine) is a male Ukrainian athlete specialising in the 200 metres and 400 metres. He won two gold medals at the 2019 European Games. He competed at the 2019 World Championships, 2018 European Championships, 2019 European Games, three (2014, 2017, 2019) European Athletics Team Championships, and 2019 Summer Universiade.

== International competitions ==
| Year | Competition | Venue | Position | Event | Notes |
Representing Ukraine
| 2014 | European Team Championships | Braunschweig, Germany | 7th | 4 × 400 m relay | 3:07.00 |
| 2017 | European Team Championships | Lille, France | 8th | 4 × 400 m relay | 3:07.03 |
| 2018 | European Championships | Berlin, Germany | 17th (h) | 400 m | 46.47 |
| 2018 | European Championships | Berlin, Germany | 10th (h) | 4 × 400 m relay | 3:03.93 |
| 2019 | European Team Championships | Bydgoszcz, Poland | 6th | 4 × 400 m relay | 3:06.04 |
| 2019 | Summer Universiade | Naples, Italy | 31st (h) | 200 m | 21.67 |
| 2019 | Summer Universiade | Naples, Italy | 24th (h) | 400 m | 47.98 |
| 2019 | World Championships | Doha, Qatar | 13th (h) | Mixed 4 × 400 metres relay | 3:17.50 |
| 2022 | European Championships | Munich, Germany | 12th (h) | 4 × 400 m relay | 3:04.15 |

== Personal bests ==
As of July 17, 2022.

Outdoor

- 100 metres – 10.90 (Kropyvnytskiy 2019)
- 200 metres – 21.05 (Lutsk 2018)
- 300 metres – 33.93 (Pärnu 2018)
- 400 metres – 46.42 (Kropyvnytskiy 2018)

Indoor

- 60 metres – 7.01 (Sumy 2019)
- 200 metres – 21.71 (Sumy 2020)
- 400 metres – 47.65 (Sumy 2019)
- Long jump – 6.58 (Sumy 2017)
