= Mykola Prostorov =

Ukrainian trampoline gymnast

- Full name: Mykola Mykolayovych Prostorov
- Born: 18 December 1994 (age 31) Kherson, Ukraine
- Height: 1.70 m (5 ft 7 in)

Gymnastics career
- Discipline: Trampoline gymnastics
- Country represented: Ukraine
- Head coaches: Igor Molchanov, Viktor Antonov
Medal record
Men's trampoline gymnastics
Representing Ukraine
World Games
Silver medal – second place	2017 Wrocław	Synchro
European Games
Silver medal – second place	2019 Minsk	Synchro
European Championships
Silver medal – second place	2016 Valladolid	Synchro
Bronze medal – third place	2018 Baku	Team

Mykola Mykolayovych Prostorov (Ukrainian: Микола Миколайович Просторов; born 18 December 1994) is a Ukrainian retired trampoline gymnast and member of the national team. He is a medalist of the World Games, European Games and European Championships, and he represented Ukraine at the 2020 Summer Olympics.

== Gymnastics career ==
Prostorov began trampoline gymnastics at the age of four because both of his parents were artistic gymnasts.

Prostorov and Dmytro Byedyevkin won the synchro silver medal at the 2016 European Championships. He represented Ukraine at the 2017 World Games and won a silver medal in the synchro competition alongside Byedyevkin. He helped Ukraine win the team bronze medal at the 2018 European Championships.

Prostorov finished fourth in the individual event at the 2019 European Games. Then in the synchro event, he won a silver medal alongside Anton Davydenko. He represented Ukraine at the 2020 Summer Olympics and finished 12th in the individual qualifications, failing to advance into the final.

Prostorov and Davydenko won the synchro silver medal at the 2023 Santarem World Cup. He then competed alongside Davydenko at the 2023 World Championships and advanced to the synchro final in first place before falling in the final. Prostorov retired from the sport in 2024 due to back and heart issues.

== Personal life ==
Prostorov is married and has a daughter, born in 2024. In May 2022, Prostorov and his family left Kherson due to the Russian invasion of Ukraine. They moved to Bad Kreuznach, Germany, and as of 2025, Prostorov works as a trampoline coach at the MTV Bad Kreuznach club.
