= Kateryna Moskalova =

Ukrainian sambo practitioner

- Born: Москальова Катерина Миколаївна; February 14, 1998 (age 28)
- Nationality: Ukrainian
- Division: 68 kg
- Style: Sambo
- Team: Osvita (Dnipropetrovsk Oblast)
- Trainer: Serhiy Shpiliev, Vadym Rohach

Kateryna Moskalova (Ukrainian: Москальова Катерина Миколаївна; born 14 February 1998) is a Ukrainian sambist. She is 2019 European Games silver medalist in women's sambo. She is also a multiple World and European championships medallist.
