= Oleh Myronets =

Ukrainian athlete

Oleh Oleksandrovich Myronets (Ukrainian: Оле́г Олекса́ндрович Миронець, born 29 May 1998 in Nedoboivtsi) is a Ukrainian athlete. He represented Ukraine at the 2021 European Athletics Indoor Championships – Men's 800 metres.
