= Halyna Kovalska =

Ukrainian sambo practitioner

- Born: Галина Ковальська; August 11, 1996 (age 30); Nadvirna, Ivano-Frankivsk Oblast
- Nationality: Ukrainian
- Division: 80 kg
- Style: Sambo
- Team: Dynamo (Ivano-Frankivsk Oblast)
- Trainer: Yevheniy Bodnarchuk

Halyna Kovalska (Ukrainian: Ковальська Галина, born on 11 August 1996 in Nadvirna, Ivano-Frankivsk Oblast) is a Ukrainian sambist. She is 2019 European Games bronze medalist in women's sambo. She is also a 2019 European champion and multiple European and World championships medallist.
