= Svitlana Malkova =

Ukrainian trampoline gymnast (born 1990)

- Born: 1990 (age 35–36) Mykolaiv, Ukraine
- Height: 1.59 m (5 ft 3 in)

Gymnastics career
- Discipline: Trampoline gymnastics
- Country represented: Ukraine; (Ukraine)
Medal record
Women's trampoline gymnastics
Representing Ukraine
World Games
Gold medal – first place	2017 Wrocław	Synchro
European Games
Silver medal – second place	2019 Minsk	Synchro
European Championships
Bronze medal – third place	2018 Baku	Synchro

Svitlana Malkova (Ukrainian: Світлана Малкова; born 1990, in Mykolaiv, Ukraine) is a Ukrainian female trampoline gymnast and member of the national team. She was champion of the World Games, medalist of the European Games and European Championships.
