= Anastasiia Komovych =

Ukrainian sambo practitioner

- Born: Анастасія Іванівна Комович; August 25, 1994 (age 32); Cherkasy, Ukraine
- Nationality: Ukrainian
- Division: +80 kg
- Style: Sambo
- Trainer: Hryhoriy Bratko, Volodymyr Rymar, Mykhailo Rudenko

Other information
- University: Cherkasy National University

Anastasiia Komovych, nee Sapsai, (Ukrainian: Анастасія Іванівна Комович (Сапсай); born 25 August 1994 in Cherkasy, Ukraine) is a Ukrainian sambist. She is 2019 European Games champion in women's sambo.

She works as lecturer at the Cherkasy Institute of Fire Safety.
