= Anastasiia Novikova =

Ukrainian sambo practitioner

- Born: Новікова Анастасія Романівна; July 30, 1995 (age 31)
- Nationality: Ukrainian
- Division: 48 kg
- Style: Sambo
- Trainer: Yevheniy Tesher, Mykhailo Rudenko

Other information
- University: H.S. Skovoroda Kharkiv National Pedagogical University

Anastasiia Novikova (Ukrainian: Новікова Анастасія Романівна; born 30 July 1997) is a Ukrainian sambist. She is 2019 European Games silver medalist in women's sambo.
