= Anton Davydenko =

Ukrainian trampoline gymnast

- Born: 16 August 1996 (age 30) Kyiv, Ukraine
- Height: 1.78 m (5 ft 10 in)

Gymnastics career
- Discipline: Trampoline gymnastics
- Country represented: Ukraine
- Head coaches: Anatoliy Kelin, Viktor Kaharlytskyi
Medal record
Men's trampoline gymnastics
Representing Ukraine
European Games
Silver medal – second place	2019 Minsk	Synchro
European Championships
Bronze medal – third place	2018 Baku	Team
Bronze medal – third place	2022 Rimini	Individual trampoline

Anton Davydenko (Ukrainian: Антон Давиденко; born 16 August 1996, in Kyiv, Ukraine) is a Ukrainian male trampoline gymnast and member of the national team. He is medalist of the European Games and European Championships.

Davydenko graduated from the National University of Ukraine on Physical Education and Sport.
