= Cyprus at the 2019 European Games =

- IOC code: CYP
- NOC: Cyprus Olympic Committee
- Website: www.olympic.org.cy

in Minsk, Belarus 21 – 30 June 2019
- Competitors: 41 in 7 sports
- Flag bearers: Andreas Makris (opening); Marios Georgiou (closing)
- Medals Ranked 39th: Gold 0 Silver 1 Bronze 0 Total 1

European Games appearances (overview)
- 2015; 2019; 2023; 2027

Cyprus competed at the 2019 European Games, in Minsk, Belarus from 21 to 30 June 2019. Cyprus has previously competed at the 2015 European Games in Baku, Azerbaijan, where it won 1 silver medal.

== Medalists ==
Medal	Name	Sport	Event	Date
Silver	Marios Georgiou	Gymnastics	Men's parallel bars	30 June

== Archery ==
Recurve

Athlete	Event	Ranking round		Round of 64	Round of 32	Round of 16	Quarterfinals	Semifinals	Final / BM	
Athlete	Event	Score	Seed	Opposition Score	Opposition Score	Opposition Score	Opposition Score	Opposition Score	Opposition Score	Rank
Mimis El Helali	Men's individual	640	33	Flink (SWE); L 0–6	Did not advance					
Mikaella Kourouna	Women's individual	584	44	Marusava (BLR); L 2–6	Did not advance					
Mimis El Helali; Mikaella Kourouna	Mixed team	1224	22	—N/a	Germany; L 0–6	Did not advance				17

Compound

Athlete	Event	Ranking round		Round of 16	Quarterfinals	Semifinals	Final / BM	
Athlete	Event	Score	Seed	Opposition Score	Opposition Score	Opposition Score	Opposition Score	Rank
Styliani Kokkinou Georgiadou	Women's individual	667	15	Avdeeva (RUS); L 137–142	Did not advance			9

== Badminton ==
Athletes	Event	Group stage				Round of 16	Quarterfinals	Semifinals	Final	Rank
Athletes	Event	Opposition Score	Opposition Score	Opposition Score	Rank	Opposition Score	Opposition Score	Opposition Score	Opposition Score	Rank
Eleni Christodoulou	Women's singles	Zaitsava (BLR); L 0–2	Kosetskaya (RUS); L 0–2	Tan (BEL); L 0–2	4	Did not advance				29

== Boxing ==
Athlete	Event	Round of 32	Round of 16	Quarterfinals	Semifinals	Final	
Athlete	Event	Opposition Result	Opposition Result	Opposition Result	Opposition Result	Opposition Result	Rank
Andreas Kokkinos	75 kg	Bakshi (RUS); L 0–5	Did not advance				

== Judo ==
Athlete	Event	Round of 64	Round of 32	Round of 16	Quarterfinals	Semifinals	Repechage	Final / BM	
Athlete	Event	Opposition Result	Opposition Result	Opposition Result	Opposition Result	Opposition Result	Opposition Result	Opposition Result	Rank
Roudolf Kourtides	Men's −73 kg	Fedosejenkovs (LAT); L 00–10	Did not advance						
Aristos Michael	Men's −81 kg	Szwarnowiecki (POL); L 00–10	Did not advance						

== Sambo ==
Athlete	Event	Quarterfinals	Semifinals	Final / BM	
Athlete	Event	Opposition Result	Opposition Result	Opposition Result	Rank
Nikolas Papadopoulos	+100 kg	Bondarenko (UKR); L 4–12^{VS}	Repechage; Fernández (ESP); L 0–5	Did not advance	

== Shooting ==
Men

Athlete	Event	Qualification		Final	
Athlete	Event	Points	Rank	Points	Rank
Andreas Makri	Trap	110	23	Did not advance	
Nicolas Vasiliou	Skeet	120	8	Did not advance	
Georgios Achilleos	Skeet	118	15	Did not advance	

Women

Athlete	Event	Qualification		Final	
Athlete	Event	Points	Rank	Points	Rank
Georgia Konstantinidou	Trap	106	8	Did not advance	
Panayiota Andreou	Skeet	116	3 Q	22	5
Andri Eleftheriou	Skeet	115	7	Did not advance	

Mixed team

Athlete	Event	Semifinals		Final / BM	
Athlete	Event	Points	Rank	Opposition Result	Rank
Andreas Makri; Georgia Konstantinidou	Trap	123	19	Did not advance	
Georgios Achilleos; Panayiota Andreou	Skeet	138	6	Did not advance	
Nicolas Vasiliou; Andri Eleftheriou	Skeet	137	7	Did not advance	
