= 2015 Southeast Pro Cycling season =

Southeast Pro Cycling
- 2015 season
- UCI code: STH
- Status: UCI Professional Continental
- Manager: Angelo Citracca
- Main sponsor(s): Southeast
- Based: Italy
- Bicycles: Cipollini

Season victories
- One-day races: 2
- Stage race overall: 2
- Stage race stages: 18
- National Championships: 1

The 2015 season for the Southeast Pro Cycling cycling team began in January at the Vuelta al Táchira. The team participated in UCI Continental Circuits and UCI World Tour events when given a wildcard invitation.

In light of the doping scandals which took place within the team, during the 2013 and 2014 season, Neri Sottoli dropped their title-sponsorship for the 2015 season and Luca Scinto left the team. Chinese construction company SouthEast Space Frame Co. became title sponsor of the team.

== 2015 roster ==
Rider	Date of birth
Rafael Andriato (BRA)	20 October 1987 (age 38)
Manuel Belletti (ITA)	14 October 1985 (age 40)
Liam Bertazzo (ITA)	17 February 1992 (age 34)
Matteo Busato (ITA)	20 December 1987 (age 38)
Ramón Carretero (PAN)	26 November 1990 (age 35)
Giorgio Cecchinel (ITA)	24 June 1989 (age 36)
Samuele Conti (ITA)	14 September 1991 (age 34)
Andrea Dal Col (ITA)	30 April 1991 (age 35)
Elia Favilli (ITA)	31 January 1989 (age 37)
Andrea Fedi (ITA)	29 May 1991 (age 35)

Rider	Date of birth
Mauro Finetto (ITA)	10 May 1985 (age 41)
Giuseppe Fonzi (ITA)	2 August 1991 (age 34)
Francesco Gavazzi (ITA)	1 August 1984 (age 41)
Jakub Mareczko (ITA)	30 April 1994 (age 32)
Jonathan Monsalve (VEN)	28 June 1989 (age 36)
Alessandro Petacchi (ITA)	3 January 1974 (age 52)
Simone Ponzi (ITA)	17 January 1987 (age 39)
Mirko Tedeschi (ITA)	5 January 1989 (age 37)
Luca Wackermann (ITA)	13 March 1992 (age 34)
Eugert Zhupa (ALB)	4 April 1990 (age 36)

Riders who joined the team for the 2015 season

Rider	2014 team
Manuel Belletti	Androni Giocattoli–Venezuela
Liam Bertazzo	neo-pro (MG.Kvis-Wilier)
Matteo Busato	neo-pro (MG.Kvis-Wilier)
Elia Favilli	Lampre–Merida
Francesco Gavazzi	Astana
Jakub Mareczko	neo-pro (Viris-Maserati)
Alessandro Petacchi	Omega Pharma–Quick-Step
Luca Wackermann	Lampre–Merida
Eugert Zhupa	neo-pro (Zalf Euromobil)

Riders who left the team during or after the 2014 season

Rider	2015 team
Gianni Bellini	Retired
Daniele Colli	Nippo–Vini Fantini
Roberto De Patre	Retired
Francesco Failli	
Tomás Gil	
Luigi Miletta	
Mattia Pozzo	Nippo–Vini Fantini
Matteo Rabottini	Provisionally suspended
Fabio Taborre	Androni Giocattoli

== Season victories ==
Date	Race	Competition	Rider	Country	Location
11 January	Vuelta al Táchira, Stage 3	UCI America Tour	Jakub Mareczko (ITA)	Venezuela	Guanare
12 January	Vuelta al Táchira, Stage 4	UCI America Tour	Jakub Mareczko (ITA)	Venezuela	Barinas
18 January	Vuelta al Táchira, Stage 10	UCI America Tour	Jonathan Monsalve (VEN)	Venezuela	San Cristóbal
8 February	Gran Premio della Costa Etruschi	UCI Europe Tour	Manuel Belletti (ITA)	Italy	Donoratico
15 March	Dwars door Drenthe	UCI Europe Tour	Manuel Belletti (ITA)	Netherlands	Roden
26 March	Settimana Internazionale di Coppi e Bartali, Stage 1a	UCI Europe Tour	Manuel Belletti (ITA)	Italy	Gatteo
13 June	Vuelta a Venezuela, Stage 2	UCI America Tour	Jakub Mareczko (ITA)	Venezuela	La Asunción
15 June	Vuelta a Venezuela, Stage 4	UCI America Tour	Mirko Tedeschi (ITA)	Venezuela	Barquisimeto
20 June	Vuelta a Venezuela, Stage 9	UCI America Tour	Jakub Mareczko (ITA)	Venezuela	Altagracia de Orituco
21 June	Tour of Slovenia, Mountains classification	UCI Europe Tour	Mauro Finetto (ITA)	Slovenia	
1 July	Sibiu Cycling Tour, Prologue	UCI Europe Tour	Rafael Andriato (BRA)	Romania	Sibiu
3 July	Sibiu Cycling Tour, Stage 2	UCI Europe Tour	Mauro Finetto (ITA)	Romania	Păltiniș
5 July	Sibiu Cycling Tour, Overall	UCI Europe Tour	Mauro Finetto (ITA)	Romania	
5 July	Sibiu Cycling Tour, Points classification	UCI Europe Tour	Mauro Finetto (ITA)	Romania	
5 July	Sibiu Cycling Tour, Mountains classification	UCI Europe Tour	Mauro Finetto (ITA)	Romania	
5 July	Sibiu Cycling Tour, Teams classification	UCI Europe Tour	(Note: The riders on the squad were Rafael Andriato, Andrea Fedi, Samuele Conti, Elia Favilli, Mauro Finetto, Francesco Gavazzi and Simone Ponzi)	Romania	
30 August	Tour do Rio, Stage 5	UCI America Tour	Andrea Dal Col (ITA)	Brazil	Rio de Janeiro
25 October	Tour of Hainan, Stage 6	UCI Asia Tour	Jakub Mareczko (ITA)	China	Sanya
31 October	Tour of Taihu Lake, Stage 1	UCI Asia Tour	Jakub Mareczko (ITA)	China	Wuxi Binhu
1 November	Tour of Taihu Lake, Stage 2	UCI Asia Tour	Jakub Mareczko (ITA)	China	Haimen
2 November	Tour of Taihu Lake, Stage 3	UCI Asia Tour	Jakub Mareczko (ITA)	China	Haimen
5 November	Tour of Taihu Lake, Stage 6	UCI Asia Tour	Jakub Mareczko (ITA)	China	Yixing Yangxian
6 November	Tour of Taihu Lake, Stage 7	UCI Asia Tour	Jakub Mareczko (ITA)	China	Changxing
7 November	Tour of Taihu Lake, Stage 8	UCI Asia Tour	Jakub Mareczko (ITA)	China	Yanguan
8 November	Tour of Taihu Lake, Stage 9	UCI Asia Tour	Jakub Mareczko (ITA)	China	Wujiang
8 November	Tour of Taihu Lake, Overall	UCI Asia Tour	Jakub Mareczko (ITA)	China	
8 November	Tour of Taihu Lake, Points classification	UCI Asia Tour	Jakub Mareczko (ITA)	China	
8 November	Tour of Taihu Lake, Young rider classification	UCI Asia Tour	Jakub Mareczko (ITA)	China	

== National, Continental and World champions 2015 ==
Date	Discipline	Jersey	Rider	Country	Location
26 June	Albania National Time Trial Champion		Eugert Zhupa (ALB)	Albania	Tirana
