= List of Albanian cyclists =

This is a list of Albanian cyclists.

== Male cyclists ==
- Besmir Banushi (born 1988)
- Haki Doku (born 1969)
- Tony Bakalli (born 1989)
- Xhuliano Kamberaj (born 1994)
- Iltjan Nika (born 1995)
- Ylber Sefa (born 1991)
- Altin Sufa (born 1988)
- Eugert Zhupa (born 1990)

== See also ==
- Albanian Cycling Federation
