= 2014 Neri Sottoli season =

2014 Neri Sottoli season
Manager	Angelo Citracca
One-day victories	4
Stage race overall victories	1
Stage race stage victories	10
Previous season • Next season

The 2014 season for the Neri Sottoli cycling team began in January at the Vuelta al Táchira. The team participated in UCI Continental Circuits and UCI World Tour events when given a wildcard invitation.

== 2014 roster ==
As of 1 April 2014.

Rider	Date of birth
Rafael Andriato (BRA)	20 October 1987 (age 39)
Gianni Bellini (ITA)	7 February 1992 (age 34)
Ramón Carretero (PAN)	26 November 1990 (age 35)
Giorgio Cecchinel (ITA)	24 June 1989 (age 37)
Francesco Chicchi (ITA)	27 November 1980 (age 45)
Daniele Colli (ITA)	19 April 1982 (age 44)
Samuele Conti (ITA)	14 September 1991 (age 35)
Andrea Dal Col (ITA)	30 April 1991 (age 35)
Roberto De Patre (ITA)	13 September 1988 (age 38)
Francesco Failli (ITA)	16 December 1983 (age 42)

Rider	Date of birth
Andrea Fedi (ITA)	29 May 1991 (age 35)
Mauro Finetto (ITA)	10 May 1985 (age 41)
Tomás Gil (VEN)	23 May 1977 (age 49)
Luigi Miletta (ITA)	9 August 1988 (age 38)
Jonathan Monsalve (VEN)	28 June 1989 (age 37)
Simone Ponzi (ITA)	17 January 1987 (age 39)
Mattia Pozzo (ITA)	26 January 1989 (age 37)
Matteo Rabottini (ITA)	14 August 1987 (age 39)
Fabio Taborre (ITA)	5 June 1985 (age 41)
Mirko Tedeschi (ITA)	5 January 1989 (age 37)

Riders who joined the team for the 2014 season

Rider	2013 team
Gianni Bellini	neo-pro (Mastromarco-Chianti Sensi)
Giorgio Cecchinel	neo-pro (Delio Gallina-Colosio)
Samuele Conti	neo-pro (CarmioOro-NGC)
Andrea Dal Col	neo-pro (UC Trevigiani)
Andrea Fedi	neo-pro (Ceramica Flaminia–Fondriest)
Simone Ponzi	Astana
Mirko Tedeschi	neo-pro (Malmantile-Romano Gaini)

Riders who left the team during or after the 2013 season

Rider	2014 team
Stefano Borchi	
Pierpaolo De Negri	Vini Fantini–Nippo
Danilo Di Luca	Suspended
Oscar Gatto	Cannondale
Stefano Garzelli	Retired
Leonardo Giordani	Retired
Kevin Hulsmans	Vastgoedservice–Golden Palace
Luca Mazzanti	Retired
Michele Merlo	
Cristiano Monguzzi	
Alessandro Proni	
Junya Sano	Nasu Blasen
Mauro Santambrogio	Suspended

== Season victories ==
Date	Race	Competition	Rider	Country	Location
15 January	Vuelta al Táchira, Stage 6	UCI America Tour	Andrea Dal Col (ITA)	Venezuela	Coloncito
2 February	Gran Premio della Costa Etruschi	UCI Europe Tour	Simone Ponzi (ITA)	Italy	Donoratico
2 March	Gran Premio di Lugano	UCI Europe Tour	Mauro Finetto (ITA)	Switzerland	Lugano
16 March	Dwars door Drenthe	UCI Europe Tour	Simone Ponzi (ITA)	Netherlands	Hoogeveen
20 March	Gran Premio Nobili Rubinetterie	UCI Europe Tour	Simone Ponzi (ITA)	Italy	Stresa
25 April	Giro del Trentino, Mountains classification	UCI Europe Tour	Jonathan Monsalve (VEN)	Italy	
4 May	Tour of Turkey, Sprints classification	UCI Europe Tour	Mattia Pozzo (ITA)	Turkey	
1 June	Giro d'Italia, Premio della Fuga classification	UCI World Tour	Andrea Fedi (ITA)	Italy	
4 July	Vuelta a Venezuela, Stage 1	UCI America Tour	Francesco Chicchi (ITA)	Venezuela	Maracaibo
6 July	Vuelta a Venezuela, Stage 3	UCI America Tour	Jonathan Monsalve (VEN)	Venezuela	Barquisimeto
10 July	Vuelta a Venezuela, Stage 7	UCI America Tour	Francesco Chicchi (ITA)	Venezuela	San Felipe
11 July	Vuelta a Venezuela, Stage 8	UCI America Tour	Rafael Andriato (BRA)	Venezuela	Valencia
12 July	Vuelta a Venezuela, Stage 9	UCI America Tour	Francesco Chicchi (ITA)	Venezuela	Cagua
21 August	Tour du Limousin, Stage 3	UCI Europe Tour	Mauro Finetto (ITA)	France	Le Maupuy - Monts de Guéret
22 August	Tour du Limousin, Overall	UCI Europe Tour	Mauro Finetto (ITA)	France	
27 August	Tour do Rio, Stage 2	UCI America Tour	Rafael Andriato (BRA)	Brazil	Volta Redonda
30 August	Tour do Rio, Stage 5	UCI America Tour	Rafael Andriato (BRA)	Brazil	Rio das Ostras
31 August	Tour do Rio, Stage 6	UCI America Tour	Rafael Andriato (BRA)	Brazil	Rio de Janeiro
