= Redi Halilaj =

Albanian cyclist (born 1989)

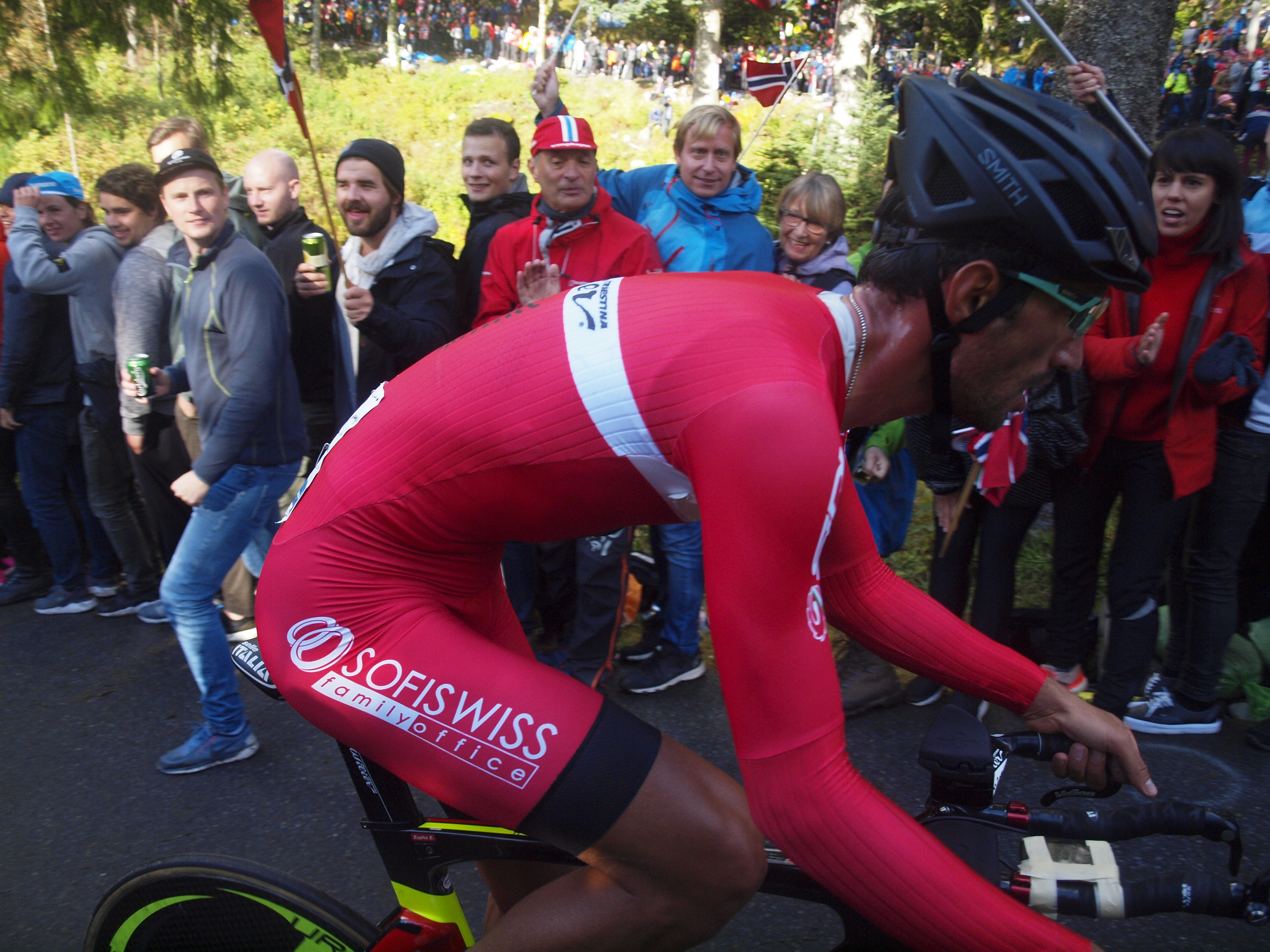
- Halilaj at the 2017 UCI Road World Championships

Personal information
- Born: August 31, 1989 (age 37) Golem, Kavajë, Albania
- Height: 1.84 m (6 ft 0 in)
- Weight: 70 kg (154 lb)

Cycling career
- Sport: Cycling
- Discipline: Road
- Role: Rider

Professional team
- 2015–2017: Amore & Vita–Selle SMP

Redi Halilaj (born 31 August 1989) is an Albanian former cyclist, who rode professionally for Amore & Vita–Selle SMP from 2015 to 2017.

== Major results ==
2007
10th GP Dell'Arno
2009
2nd Road race, National Road Championships
2010
1st Road race, National Road Championships
1st Stage 6 Tour of Albania
2013
National Road Championships

1st Road race
1st Time trial

2015
1st Road race, National Road Championships
2016
3rd Road race, National Road Championships
3rd Balkan Elite Road Classics
9th Philadelphia International Cycling Classic
2017
1st Stage 4 Tour of Eritrea
2nd Road race, National Road Championships
5th Asmara Circuit
10th Overall Tour of Albania
