= Tour of Kosovo =

Cycling race in Kosovo

Race details
- Date: July
- Region: Kosovo
- Local name: Tour de Kosova
- Discipline: Road
- Competition: UCI Europe Tour
- Type: Stage race
- Race director: Edwin Cruijssen

History
- Editions: 22 (as of 2025)
- Most wins: No repeat winners
- Most recent: Danijel Agricola (NED)

Tour of Kosovo is an annual men's multiple stage bicycle race held annually in Kosovo. Since 2019, it has been on the UCI Europe Tour, classified as a 2.2 event.

== Winners ==
Year	Winner	Second	Third
2010	(Germany) Karsten Keunecke	(Albania) Jonid Tosku	(Albania) Besmir Banushi
2011	(Albania) Ylber Sefa	(Albania) Altin Sufa	(Kosovo) Qëndrim Guri
2012	(Albania) Besmir Banushi		
2013	(Germany) Heinrich Berger	(Serbia) Esad Hasanović	(Germany) Benjamin Holler
2014	(Albania) Olsian Velia	(Germany) Alexander Schlenkrich	(Germany) Sascha Starker
2015	(Kosovo) Alban Nuha	(Albania) Ylber Sefa	(Albania) Besmir Banushi
2016	(Albania) Ylber Sefa	(Kosovo) Egzon Misini	(Albania) Nikolla Xhukiç
2017	(Bulgaria) Stanimir Cholakov	(Albania) Besmir Banushi	(Netherlands) Bart Dielissen
2018	(United States) Innokenty Zavyalov	(Netherlands) Daaf Koemans	(Netherlands) Bart Dielissen
2019	(Greece) Charalampos Kastrantas	(Bulgaria) Yordan Andreev	(Netherlands) Kenny Nijssen
2020	Cancelled due to the COVID-19 pandemic		
2021	(France) Tristan Delacroix	(Albania) Ylber Sefa	(Germany) Nikodemus Holler
2022	Cancelled		
2023	(Italy) Nicolò Garibbo	(Italy) Piergiorgio Cozzani	(Greece) Nikolaos Drakos
2024	Cancelled		
2025	(Netherlands) Danijel Agricola	(United Kingdom) Rowan Baker	(United Kingdom) Edward Morgan
