= Albanian Cycling Federation =

Governing body of cycle sports in Albania

Federata Shqiptare e Çiklizmit
- Sport: Cycling
- Jurisdiction: Albania
- Abbreviation: FSHÇ
- Founded: 1925
- Affiliation: UCI
- Headquarters: Tirana
- President: Skënder Anxhaku

Official website
- www.albcycling.al

Albanian Cycling Federation (FSHÇ) is the main national governing body for cycle sport in Albania. FSHÇ is a member of the Union Cycliste Internationale (UCI) and Union Européenne de Cyclisme (UET).

== See also ==
- List of Albanian cyclists
- Tour of Albania
- Balkan Elite Road Classics
