= Iltjan Nika =

Albanian road cyclist (born 1995)

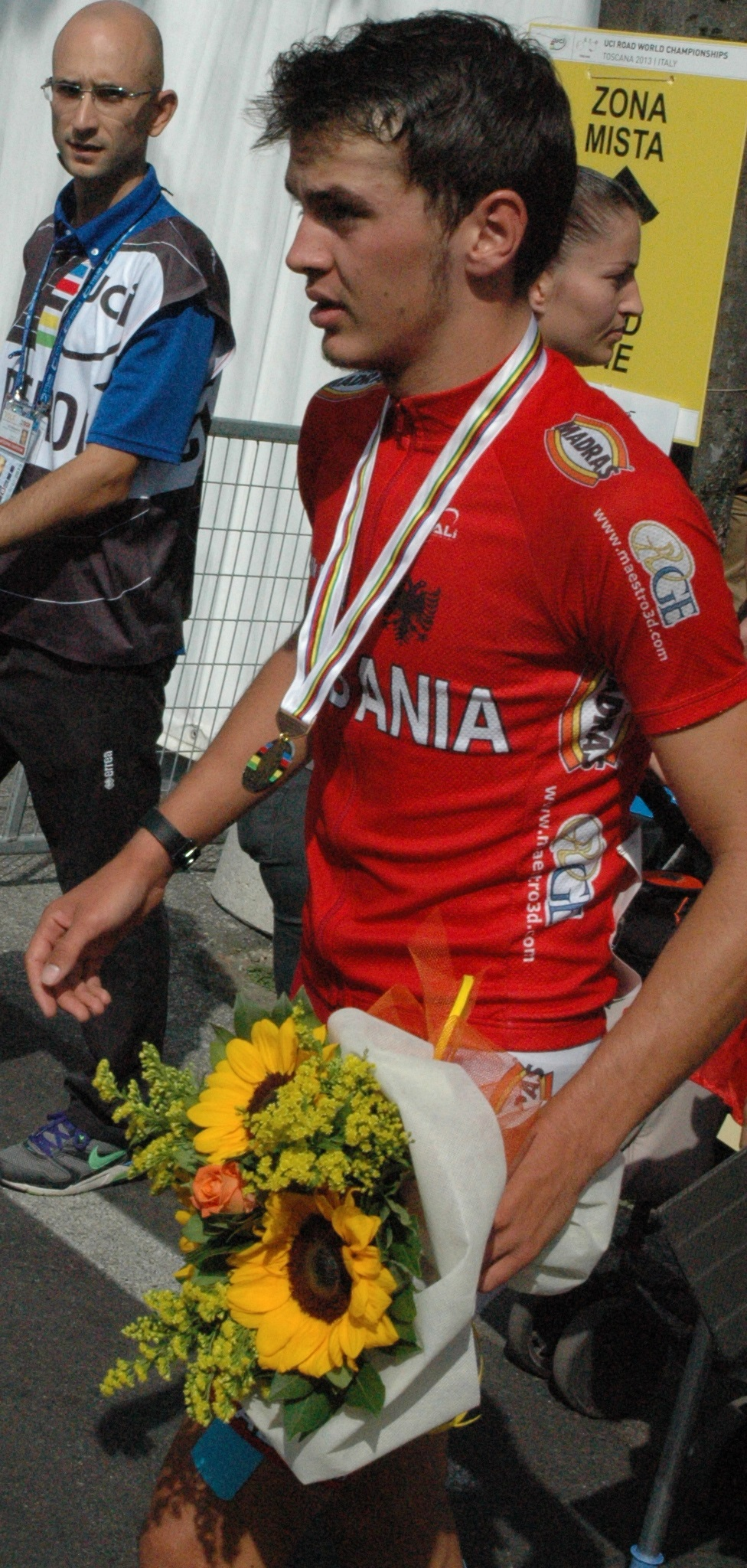
- Nika at the 2013 UCI Road World Championships

Personal information
- Full name: Iltjan Nika
- Born: 23 March 1995 (age 31) Pukë, Albania

Cycling career
- Sport: Cycling
- Discipline: Road
- Role: Rider

Amateur teams
- 2009–2011: Pedale Mancianese
- 2012–2013: Team Cipriani e Gestri
- 2014: ASD Futura Team
- 2017: Mastromarco

Professional teams
- 2015–2016: D'Amico–Bottecchia
- 2018–2019: Amore & Vita–Prodir

Iltjan Nika (born 23 March 1995) is an Albanian road cyclist, who last rode for UCI Continental team Amore & Vita–Prodir. Nika is best known for winning the bronze medal in the 2013 UCI World Junior Road Race Championships.

== Major results ==
2013
1st Road race, National Junior Road Championships
1st National Junior Cyclo-cross Championships
3rd Road race, UCI Junior Road World Championships
2014
National Road Championships

1st Time trial
2nd Road race

2015
National Under-23 Road Championships

1st Road race
1st Time trial

2016
2nd Road race, National Road Championships
3rd Balkan Elite Road Classics
2017
1st Time trial, National Road Championships
