= Vini Zabù =

Italian cycling team

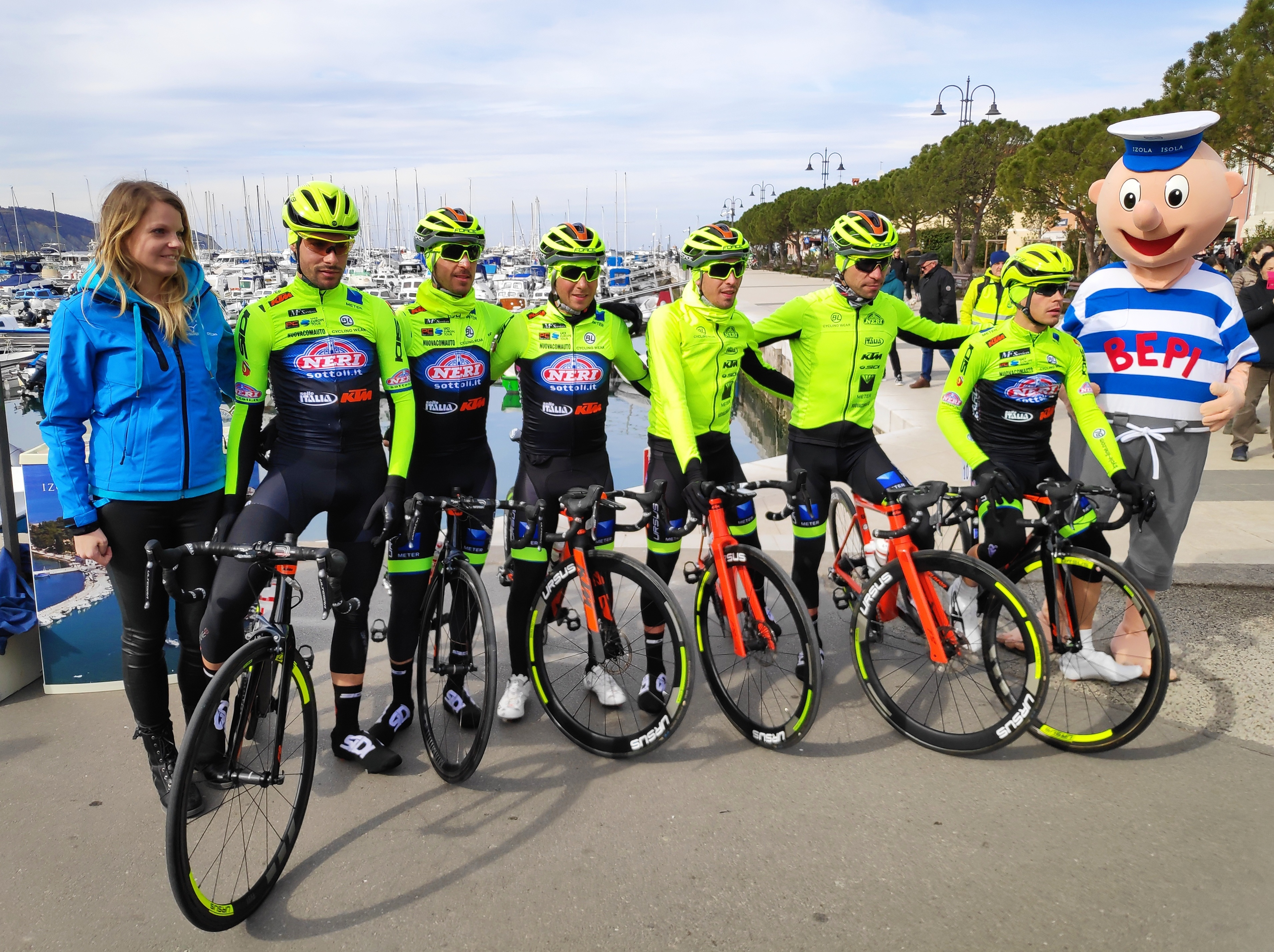
- Team in 2019

Team information
- UCI code: THR
- Registered: Italy
- Founded: 2009
- Disbanded: 2021
- Discipline: Road
- Status: UCI ProTeam
- Bicycles: Specialized (2009); MCipollini (2010–2015); Wilier Triestina (2016–2018); KTM (2019–2020); Corratec (2021)
- Website: Team home page

Key personnel
- General manager: Angelo Citracca
- Team managers: Mykola Myrza; Luca Scinto

Team name history
- 2009–2010 2011 2012 2013 2014 2014 2015 2015 2016 2016 2017–2018 2019 2020 2020 2021: ISD–Neri (ISD); Farnese Vini–Neri Sottoli (FAR); Farnese Vini–Selle Italia (FAR); Vini Fantini–Selle Italia (VIN); Yellow Fluo (YEL); Neri Sottoli (NRI); Neri Sottoli-Alé; Southeast Pro Cycling; Southeast–Venezuela; Wilier Triestina–Southeast; Wilier Triestina–Selle Italia; Neri Sottoli–Selle Italia–KTM; Vini Zabù–KTM; Vini Zabù–Brado–KTM; Vini Zabù
Vini Zabù jersey
Jersey

Vini Zabù (UCI team code: THR) was an Italian UCI ProTeam that existed from 2009 until 2021.

In light of the doping scandals which took place within the team, during the 2013 and 2014 season, Neri Sottoli dropped their title-sponsorship for the 2015 season and Luca Scinto left the team (they eventually returned as a sponsor for the 2019 season). As a result of the lack of sponsorship Chinese construction company SouthEast Space Frame Co. became title sponsor of the team. In 2019, the team is sponsored by KTM (bicycles), gaining naming rights in the process.

== Doping ==
On 24 May 2013, while Danilo Di Luca was riding in the Giro, the UCI announced that he had had an adverse finding in an out-of-competition doping test at his home on 29 April. On 3 June 2013, it was announced that Mauro Santambrogio had tested positive for erythropoietin (EPO) after the first stage of the 2013 Giro d'Italia. The team fired both riders immediately.

On 12 September 2014, the UCI revealed that Matteo Rabottini has tested positive for EPO in an out of competition test performed on August 8. As a result, he was dropped by the Italian Cycling federations long list for the 2014 UCI Road World Championships. In December 2014 Rabottini's samples were counter analysed and provided confirmation that they were positive for EPO. The team is set to terminate Rabottini's contract and begin legal proceedings against him upon final confirmation of his positive test.

As a result of the teams poor doping history, the team has been suspended by the MPCC and has jeopardised their 2015 Giro d'Italia wildcard. As it was announced in January 2015 that Southeast Pro Cycling had received a wildcard invitation to participate in the 2015 Giro d'Italia. On 9 June the UCI confirmed that Ramón Carretero had tested positive for EPO on April 22, during the Tour of Turkey.

In September 2016, Samuele Conti tested positive for GHRP-2. Conti was handed a three years and seven months ban for his doping positive.

In October 2020 Matteo Spreafico tested positive for ostarine at the 2020 Giro d'Italia.

In March 2021, Matteo De Bonis returned a positive out-of-competition test for EPO, if confirmed by testing of his B-Sample, the team risks being suspended for 15–45 days throwing the team into jeopardy of missing the 2021 Giro d'Italia. On 19 April after 2 positive tests in 12 months UCI banned whole team from racing for 20 days. Team was pulled out of 2021 Giro d'Italia and replaced with Androni Giocattoli–Sidermec. The team folded at the end of the 2021 season.

== Final roster ==
As of 8 January 2021.

Rider	Date of birth
Andrea Bartolozzi (ITA)	3 May 1999 (aged 21)
Liam Bertazzo (ITA)	17 February 1992 (aged 28)
Mattia Bevilacqua (ITA)	17 June 1998 (aged 22)
Simone Bevilacqua (ITA)	22 February 1997 (aged 23)
Matteo De Bonis (ITA)	26 September 1995 (aged 25)
Andrea Di Renzo (ITA)	24 January 1995 (aged 25)
Marco Frapporti (ITA)	30 March 1985 (aged 35)
Roberto González (PAN)	21 May 1994 (aged 26)
Kamil Gradek (POL)	17 September 1990 (aged 30)
Alessandro Iacchi (ITA)	26 May 1999 (aged 21)
Jakub Mareczko (ITA)	30 April 1994 (aged 26)

Rider	Date of birth
Davide Orrico (ITA)	17 February 1990 (aged 30)
Daniel Pearson (GBR)	26 February 1994 (aged 26)
Jan Petelin (LUX)	2 July 1996 (aged 24)
Joab Schneiter (SUI)	6 August 1998 (aged 22)
Riccardo Stacchiotti (ITA)	8 November 1991 (aged 29)
Veljko Stojnić (SRB)	4 February 1999 (aged 21)
Leonardo Tortomasi (ITA)	21 January 1994 (aged 26)
Wout van Elzakker (NED)	14 November 1998 (aged 22)
Etienne van Empel (NED)	14 April 1994 (aged 26)
Edoardo Zardini (ITA)	10 August 1994 (aged 26)

== Major wins ==
2009
Stage 3 Giro di Sardegna, Oscar Gatto
Stage 1b Settimana Internazionale di Coppi e Bartali, Team time trial
Stage 2 Tour of Slovenia, Giovanni Visconti
Stage 3 Brixia Tour, Santo Anzà
Coppa Ugo Agostoni, Giovanni Visconti
Trofeo Melinda, Giovanni Visconti
Gran Premio Industria e Commercio di Prato, Giovanni Visconti

2010
Classica Sarda, Giovanni Visconti
Overall Tour de Langkawi, José Rujano

Stage 6, José Rujano

Stage 5 Settimana Internazionale di Coppi e Bartali, Bartosz Huzarski
Stage 1 Settimana Ciclistica Lombarda, Bartosz Huzarski
Overall Tour of Turkey, Giovanni Visconti

Stages 3 & 4, Giovanni Visconti

Stage 1 Tour de Luxembourg, Giovanni Visconti
Gran Premio Nobili Rubinetterie – Coppa Città di Stresa, Oscar Gatto
Stage 1 Brixia Tour, Team time trial
Giro della Romagna, Patrik Sinkewitz

2011
Stages 1, 2, 6, 7 & 10 Tour de Langkawi, Andrea Guardini
Stage 2 Giro della Provincia di Reggio Calabria, Oscar Gatto
Stage 5 Tour of Qatar, Andrea Guardini
Gran Premio dell'Insubria-Lugano, Giovanni Visconti
Stage 5 Settimana Internazionale di Coppi e Bartali, Giovanni Visconti
Stages 1 & 7 Tour of Turkey, Andrea Guardini
Stage 4 Tour of Turkey, Matteo Rabottini
Stage 8 Giro d'Italia, Oscar Gatto
Stage 3 Tour of Slovenia, Andrea Guardini
Trofeo Matteotti, Oscar Gatto
Stage 5 Volta a Portugal, Andrea Guardini
Gran Premio Industria e Commercio Artigianato Carnaghese, Giovanni Visconti
Stage 4 Settimana Ciclistica Lombarda, Giovanni Visconti
Giro della Romagna, Oscar Gatto
Stage 5 Giro di Padania, Andrea Guardini

2012
Stages 2, 3, 4, 8, 9 & 10 Tour de Langkawi, Andrea Guardini
GP Industria & Artigianato di Larciano, Filippo Pozzato
Jūrmala Grand Prix, Rafael Andriato
Stage 15 Giro d'Italia, Matteo Rabottini
Stage 18 Giro d'Italia, Andrea Guardini
Mountains classification in the Giro d'Italia, Matteo Rabottini
Stages 9, 10 & 12 Tour of Qinghai Lake, Andrea Guardini
Trofeo Matteotti, Pierpaolo De Negri
Châteauroux Classic, Rafael Andriato
Giro del Veneto, Oscar Gatto
Stage 3 Giro di Padania, Oscar Gatto

2013
Stage 2 Vuelta al Táchira, Michele Merlo
Stage 10 Vuelta al Táchira, Cristiano Monguzzi
Stages 4 & 10 Tour de Langkawi, Francesco Chicchi
Dwars door Vlaanderen, Oscar Gatto
GP Industria & Artigianato di Larciano, Mauro Santambrogio
Stage 14 Giro d'Italia, Mauro Santambrogio
Stage 3 Tour of Japan, Pierpaolo De Negri
Prologue (ITT) & Stage 3 Tour de Kumano, Mattia Pozzo
Stage 1 Tour de Kumano, Michele Merlo
Riga–Jūrmala GP, Francesco Chicchi
Jūrmala GP, Francesco Chicchi
Stage 8 Vuelta a Venezuela, Stefano Borchi
Stage 2 Tour do Rio, Rafael Andriato

2014
Stage 6 (ITT) Vuelta al Táchira, Andrea Dal Col
Gran Premio della Costa Etruschi, Simone Ponzi
Gran Premio di Lugano, Mauro Finetto
Dwars door Drenthe, Simone Ponzi
Gran Premio Nobili Rubinetterie, Simone Ponzi
Stages 1, 7 & 9 Vuelta a Venezuela, Francesco Chicchi
Stage 3 Vuelta a Venezuela, Jonathan Monsalve
Stage 8 Vuelta a Venezuela, Rafael Andriato
Overall Tour du Limousin, Mauro Finetto

Stage 3, Mauro Finetto

Stages 2, 5 & 6 Tour do Rio, Rafael Andriato

2015
Stages 3 & 4 Vuelta al Táchira, Jakub Mareczko
Stage 10 Vuelta al Táchira, Jonathan Monsalve
Gran Premio della Costa Etruschi, Manuel Belletti
Dwars door Drenthe, Manuel Belletti
Stage 1a Settimana Internazionale di Coppi e Bartali, Manuel Belletti
Stages 2 & 9 Vuelta a Venezuela, Jakub Mareczko
Stage 4 Vuelta a Venezuela, Mirko Tedeschi
Albania National Time Trial Championships, Eugert Zhupa
Overall Sibiu Cycling Tour, Mauro Finetto

Prologue (ITT), Rafael Andriato
Stage 2, Mauro Finetto

Stage 5 Tour do Rio, Andrea Dal Col
Stage 6 Tour of Hainan, Jakub Mareczko
Overall Tour of Taihu Lake, Jakub Mareczko

Stages 1, 2, 3, 6, 7, 8 & 9, Jakub Mareczko

2016
Stage 7 Tour de San Luis, Jakub Mareczko
Trofeo Laigueglia, Andrea Fedi
Stage 6 Tour de Langkawi, Jakub Mareczko
Stage 1a Settimana Internazionale di Coppi e Bartali, Manuel Belletti
Stage 3 Settimana Internazionale di Coppi e Bartali, Jakub Mareczko
Stages 5 & 8 Presidential Tour of Turkey, Jakub Mareczko
Albania National Time Trial Championships, Eugert Zhupa
Albania National Road Race Championships, Eugert Zhupa
Balkan Elite Road Classics, Eugert Zhupa
Stages 2, 11 & 13 Tour of Qinghai Lake, Jakub Mareczko
Stage 1 Tour of Hainan, Rafael Andriato
Tour of Yancheng Coastal Wetlands, Jakub Mareczko
Stages 1, 2 & 6 Tour of Taihu Lake, Jakub Mareczko

2017
Stages 3 & 7 Tour de Langkawi, Jakub Mareczko
Stage 3 Le Tour de Bretagne Cycliste, Jakub Mareczko
Overall Tour of China I, Liam Bertazzo

Stage 2, Liam Bertazzo

Overall Tour of Taihu Lake, Jakub Mareczko

Stages 2, 3, 4, 6 & 7, Jakub Mareczko

Overall Tour of Hainan, Jacopo Mosca

Stage 7, Jacopo Mosca

2018
Stage 7 La Tropicale Amissa Bongo, Luca Pacioni
Stages 2 & 4 Sharjah Tour, Jakub Mareczko
Stage 5 Tour de Taiwan, Luca Pacioni
Stage 6 Le Tour de Langkawi, Luca Pacioni
Stages 1, 3, 5, 7 & 10 Tour du Maroc, Jakub Mareczko
Stage 8 Tour du Maroc, Marco Coledan
Albania National Time Trial Championships, Eugert Zhupa
Stage 4 Tour of China I, Jacopo Mosca
Stage 5 Tour of China II, Jakub Mareczko
Stages 3, 5 & 7 Tour of Taihu Lake, Jakub Mareczko

2019
Trofeo Laigueglia, Simone Velasco
Stage 3 Settimana Internazionale di Coppi e Bartali, Simone Velasco
Stage 7 Tour de Langkawi, Simone Bevilacqua
Stage 3 Tour of Albania, Moreno Marchetti
Stage 4 Tour of Slovenia, Giovanni Visconti
Stage 3 Tour of Austria, Giovanni Visconti
Stage 1 Tour of Utah, Umberto Marengo
Giro di Toscana, Giovanni Visconti

2020
Overall Tour du Limousin, Luca Wackermann

Stage 1, Luca Wackermann

Serbia National Time Trial Championships, Veljko Stojnić

2021
Trofej Umag, Jakub Mareczko
Stage 1a Settimana Internazionale di Coppi e Bartali, Jakub Mareczko

== Supplementary statistics ==
Grand Tours by highest finishing position
Race	2009	2010	2011	2012	2013	2014	2015	2016	2017	2018	2019	2020	2021
Giro d'Italia	18	–	49	58	55	17	30	57	52	86	–	88	DNS
Tour de France	–	–	–	–	–	–	–	–	–	–	–	–	–
Vuelta a España	–	–	–	–	–	–	–	–	–	–	–	–	–
Major week-long stage races by highest finishing position
Race	2009	2010	2011	2012	2013	2014	2015	2016	2017	2018	2019	2020	2021
Tour Down Under	–	–	–	–	–	–	–	–	–	–	–	–	NH
Paris–Nice	–	–	–	–	–	–	–	–	–	–	–	–	–
Tirreno–Adriatico	–	71	11	18	7	–	–	–	–	24	37	84	–
Volta a Catalunya	–	–	–	–	–	–	–	–	–	–	–	NH	–
Tour of the Basque Country	–	–	–	–	–	–	–	–	–	–	–	NH	–
Giro del Trentino	25	23	–	–	–	–	27	11	17	36	17	NH	–
Tour de Romandie	–	–	–	–	–	–	–	–	–	–	–	NH	–
Critérium du Dauphiné	–	–	–	–	–	–	–	–	–	–	–	–	–
Tour de Suisse	–	–	–	–	–	–	–	–	–	–	–	NH	–
Tour de Pologne	24	–	–	42	–	–	–	–	–	–	–	–	–
Eneco Tour	–	–	–	–	–	–	–	–	–	–	–	–	–
Monument races by highest finishing position
Race	2009	2010	2011	2012	2013	2014	2015	2016	2017	2018	2019	2020	2021
Milan–San Remo	30	32	24	6	20	36	–	8	31	52	31	28	–
Tour of Flanders	–	–	–	2	15	–	–	75	8	–	–	–	–
Paris–Roubaix	–	–	–	17	–	–	–	–	–	–	–	NH	–
Liège–Bastogne–Liège	–	–	–	–	–	–	–	–	–	–	–	–	–
Giro di Lombardia	67	DNF	7	19	–	19	32	46	30	35	17	18	71
Classics by highest finishing position
Classic	2009	2010	2011	2012	2013	2014	2015	2016	2017	2018	2019	2020	2021
Omloop Het Nieuwsblad	135	–	–	18	58	–	63	55	–	–	–	–	–
Kuurne–Brussels–Kuurne	74	–	–	29	NH	–	38	25	–	–	–	–	57
Strade Bianche	6	17	7	3	23	48	33	30	–	–	38	–	102
E3 Harelbeke	–	–	–	27	–	–	99	39	–	–	–	NH	DNF
Gent–Wevelgem	–	–	–	9	–	–	23	–	–	–	–	–	–
Amstel Gold Race	–	–	72	13	–	–	–	–	–	–	–	NH	–
La Flèche Wallonne	–	–	–	–	–	–	–	–	–	–	–	–	–
Clásica de San Sebastián	—	—	—	—	—	—	—	—	—	—	—	NH	–
Paris–Tours	–	–	–	–	–	–	–	–	–	–	–	–	–

Legend
—	Did not compete
DNS	Did not Start
DNF	Did not finish
NH	Not held

== National champions ==
2009
Ukraine Time Trial Championship, Andriy Hrivko
2010
Italy Road Race Championships, Giovanni Visconti
2011
Italy Road Race Championships, Giovanni Visconti
2015
Albania Time Trial Championship, Eugert Zhupa
2016
Albania Time Trial Championship, Eugert Zhupa
Albania Road Race Championship, Eugert Zhupa
2018
Albania Time Trial Championship, Eugert Zhupa
2020
Serbia Time Trial Championship, Veljko Stojnić
