= Xhuliano Kamberaj =

Albanian cyclist (born 1994)

Personal information
- Full name: Xhuliano Kamberaj
- Born: 30 May 1994 (age 32) Berat, Albania

Cycling career
- Sport: Cycling
- Discipline: Road
- Role: Rider
- Rider type: Sprinter

Amateur teams
- 2009: U.S. Aurora Petrolvilla Group
- 2010–2012: Graphic Line–Ires Costruzioni
- 2014: Cipollini Alé Rime ASD
- 2015: Cycling Team Friuli
- 2017: Gragnano Sporting Club
- 2018: Polartec–Kometa Amateur
- 2018: Team Beltrami–Argon 18

Professional team
- 2016: Skydive Dubai–Al Ahli

Xhuliano Kamberaj (also spelled Giuliano Kamberaj; born 30 May 1994) is an Albanian cyclist, who last rode for Team Beltrami–Argon 18.

== Major results ==
2014
National Road Championships

1st Road race
2nd Time trial

7th Circuito del Porto
2015
2nd Milan–Busseto
3rd Trofeo Gianfranco Bianchin
4th Circuito del Porto
2017
1st Stage 3 Tour of Albania
9th Circuito del Porto
2018
1st Stage 3 Tour of Albania
