= 2018 in cycle sport =

The 2018 in cycling results is given as follows:

== Cycle ball ==
=== International indoor cycling events ===
- May 11 & 12: 2018 UEC Juniors Indoor Cycling European Championships in (Switzerland) Bazenheid
  - Cycle ball: Germany (Tim & Eric Lehmann) defeated Austria (Maximilian Schwendinger & Bastian Arnoldi), 5–1, in the final.
  - Junior Artistic cycling winners: (Germany) Tim Weber (m) / (Austria) Julia Walser (f)
- June 1 & 2: 2018 UEC Elite Indoor Cycling European Championships in Wiesbaden
  - Cycle ball: Austria (Markus Bröll & Patrick Schnetzer)
  - Elite Single Artistic cycling winners: (Germany) Lukas Kohl (m) / (Germany) Viola Brand (f)
  - Elite Women's Pair Artistic cycling winners: Germany (Lena & Lisa Bringsken)
  - Elite Mixed Pair Artistic cycling winners: Germany (Nina Stapf & Patrick Tisch)
  - Elite Mixed ACT4 Artistic cycling winners: Germany (Annamaria Milo, Julia Dörner, Katharina Gülich, & Ramona Ressel)
- November 23–25: 2018 UCI Indoor Cycling World Championships in (Belgium) Liège
  - Elite Women's Pair Artistic cycling winners: Germany (Lena & Lisa Bringsken)
  - Elite Mixed Pair Artistic cycling winners: Germany (Max Hanselmann & Serafin Schefold)
  - Elite Mixed ACT4 Artistic cycling winners: Germany (Julia Dörner, Annamaria Milo, Ramona Ressel, & Katharina Gülich)

=== 2018 Artistic Cycling World Cup ===
- February 10: ACWC #1 in (Czech Republic) Prague
  - Elite Singles winners: (Germany) Lukas Kohl (m) / (Germany) Milena Slupina (f)
  - Women's Elite - Pair Artistic winner: Germany (Sophie-Marie Nattmann & Caroline Wurth)
  - Mixed Elite - Artistic Cycling ACT4 winners: Switzerland (Melanie Schmid, Jennifer Schmid, Céline Burlet, & Flavia Zuber)
  - Mixed Elite - Pair Artistic Cycling Mix winners: Germany (Serafin Schefold & Max Hanselmann)
- June 30: ACWC #2 in (Netherlands) Heerlen
  - Elite Singles winners: (Germany) Lukas Kohl (m) / (Germany) Milena Slupina (f)
  - Women's Elite - Pair Artistic winners: Germany (Sophie-Marie Nattmann & Caroline Wurth)
  - Mixed Elite - Artistic Cycling ACT4 winners: Germany (Anton Köhler, Nicole Kerner, Fabian Kerner, & Maike Reinfurth) (default)
  - Mixed Elite - Pair Artistic Cycling Mix winners: Germany (Serafin Schefold & Max Hanselmann)
- August 12: ACWC #3 in Hong Kong
  - Elite Singles winners: (Germany) Lukas Kohl (m) / (Germany) Viola Brand (f)
  - Women's Elite - Pair Artistic winners: Germany (Sophie-Marie Nattmann & Caroline Wurth)
  - Mixed Elite - Artistic Cycling ACT4 winners: Switzerland (Melanie Schmid, Jennifer Schmid, Céline Burlet, & Flavia Zuber)
  - Mixed Elite - Pair Artistic Cycling Mix winners: Germany (Serafin Schefold & Max Hanselmann)
- November 17: ACWC #4 (final) in Erlenbach
  - Elite Singles winners: (Germany) Lukas Kohl (m) / (Germany) Maren Haase (f)
  - Women's Elite - Pair Artistic winners: Germany (Sophie-Marie Nattmann & Caroline Wurth)
  - Mixed Elite - Artistic Cycling ACT4 winners: Switzerland (Melanie Schmid, Jennifer Schmid, Céline Burlet, & Flavia Zuber)
  - Mixed Elite - Pair Artistic Cycling Mix winners: Germany (Serafin Schefold & Max Hanselmann)

=== 2018 Cycle-Ball World Cup ===
- April 14: CBWC #1 in Kamenz
  - Winners: Germany (André Kopp & Raphael Kopp)
- April 28: CBWC #2 in (Germany) Altdorf
  - Winners: Austria (Markus Bröll & Patrick Schnetzer)
- May 26: CBWC #3 in (Belgium) Beringen
  - Winners: Austria (Florian Fischer & Simon König)
- August 11: CBWC #4 in Hong Kong
  - Winners: Germany (Felix Weinert & Valentin Notheis)
- September 8: CBWC #5 in (Germany) Krofdorf-Gleiberg
  - Winners: Austria (Markus Bröll & Patrick Schnetzer)
- September 29: CBWC #6 in (Germany) Sangerhausen
  - Winners: Austria (Markus Bröll & Patrick Schnetzer)
- October 13: CBWC #7 in (Switzerland) St. Gallen
  - Winners: Germany (Bernd Mlady & Gerhard Mlady)
- November 3: CBWC #8 (final) in Höchst
  - Winners: Austria (Florian Fischer & Simon König)

== Cycling - BMX ==
=== International BMX events ===
- March 21: 2018 Oceania BMX Continental Championships in Bunbury, Western Australia
  - Elite winners: (Australia) Corey Frieswyk (m) / (New Zealand) Sarah Walker (f)
  - Junior winners: (Australia) Nathaniel Rodway (m) / (Australia) Ashlee Miller (f)
- May 26 & 27: 2018 Asian BMX Continental Championships in (Thailand) Chai Nat
  - Elite winners: (Indonesia) Rio Akbar (m) / (China) LU Yan (f)
  - Junior winners: (Japan) Asuma Nakai (m) / (Japan) Kanami Tanno (f)
- June 5–9: 2018 UCI BMX World Championships in (Azerbaijan) Baku
  - Elite winners: (France) Sylvain André (m) / (Netherlands) Laura Smulders (f)
  - Junior winners: (France) Leo Garoyan (m) / (Netherlands) Indy Scheepers (f)
- July 13–15: 2018 Junior European BMX Continental Championships in (France) Sarrians
  - Junior winners: (France) Leo Garoyan (m) / (Netherlands) Indy Scheepers (f)
- July 20: 2018 Pan American BMX Continental Championships in (Colombia) Medellín
  - Elite winners: (Brazil) Anderson Ezequiel de Souza Filho (m) / (Brazil) Priscilla Carnaval (f)
  - Junior winners: (Colombia) Juan Esteban Naranjo Murillo (m) / (Colombia) Laura Tatiana Ordoñez Urbano (f)
- August 10 & 11: 2018 UEC BMX European Championships in (United Kingdom) Glasgow
  - Elite winners: (United Kingdom) Kyle Evans (m) / (Netherlands) Laura Smulders (f)
- November 7–11: 2018 UCI Urban Cycling World Championships (BMX Freestyle) in (China) Chengdu
  - Elite winners: (United States) Justin Dowell (m) / (United States) Perris Benegas (f)
- November 9 & 10: 2018 African BMX Continental Championships in Egypt
  - Elite winners: (South Africa) Dylan Eggar (m) / (Sudan) Arafa Hassan (f)
  - Junior winners: (Egypt) Ahmed Clip (m) / (Egypt) Alaa El Sayed (f)

=== 2018 UCI BMX Supercross World Cup ===
- March 31 & April 1: SXWC #1 & #2 in (France) Saint-Quentin-en-Yvelines
  - Men's Elite winners: (Netherlands) Niek Kimmann (#1) / (France) Joris Daudet (#2)
  - Women's Elite winner: (Netherlands) Laura Smulders (2 times)
- May 5 & 6: SXWC #3 & #4 in (Netherlands) Papendal
  - Men's Elite winners: (Netherlands) Niek Kimmann (#1) / (France) Sylvain André (#2)
  - Women's Elite winners: (Netherlands) Laura Smulders (#1) / (United States) Alise Willoughby (#2)
- May 12 & 13: SXWC #5 & #6 in (Belgium) Heusden-Zolder
  - Men's Elite winner: (Netherlands) Niek Kimmann (2 times)
  - Women's Elite winners: (United Kingdom) Bethany Shriever(#1) / (Netherlands) Laura Smulders (#2)
- September 29 & 30: SXWC #7 & #8 (finals) in (Argentina) Santiago del Estero
  - Men's Elite winners: (United States) Corben Sharrah (#1) / (France) Joris Daudet (#2)
  - Women's Elite winners: (Netherlands) Laura Smulders (#1) / (Australia) Saya Sakakibara(#2)

=== 2018 FISE BMX Freestyle Park World Cup ===
- April 6–8: FPWC #1 in (Japan) Hiroshima
  - Elite winners: (Australia) Brandon Loupos (m) / (United States) Hannah Roberts (f)
- May 9–13: FPWC #2 in (France) Montpellier
  - Note: The Men's Elite Final BMX Freestyle Park WC here was cancelled, due to weather conditions
  - Women's Elite winner: (Japan) Oike Minato
- July 14 & 15: FPWC #3 in (Canada) Edmonton
  - Elite winners: (Australia) Logan Martin / (United States) Hannah Roberts
- November 2–4: FPWC #4 (final) in (China) Chengdu
  - Elite winners: (Australia) Jake Wallwork (m) / (Germany) Lara Lessmann (f)

=== 2018 UEC BMX European Cup ===
- March 24 & 25: UEC BMX #1 & #2 in (Italy) Verona
  - Elite #1 winners: (Netherlands) Niek Kimmann (m) / (Netherlands) Laura Smulders (f)
  - Elite #2 winners: (United Kingdom) Kyle Evans (m) / (Australia) Saya Sakakibara (f)
  - Men's Junior winners: (Netherlands) Tino Popma (#1) / (United Kingdom) Ross Cullen (#2)
  - Women's Junior winner: (Switzerland) Zoe Claessens (2 times)
- April 14 & 15: UEC BMX #3 & #4 in (Belgium) Heusden-Zolder
  - Elite winners: (Netherlands) Niek Kimmann (m; 2 times) / (Netherlands) Laura Smulders (f; 2 times)
  - Men's Junior winners: (France) Leo Garoyan (#1) / (France) Baptiste Vieillard (#2)
  - Women's Junior winner: (Switzerland) Zoe Claessens (2 times)
- April 28 & 29: UEC BMX #5 & #6 in (Netherlands) Kampen
  - Men's Elite winners: (Netherlands) Twan van Gendt (#1) / (Netherlands) Mitchel Schotman (#2)
  - Women's Elite winner: (Netherlands) Judy Baauw (2 times)
  - Junior winners: (France) Leo Garoyan (m; 2 times) / (Switzerland) Zoe Claessens (f; 2 times)
- May 19 & 20: UEC BMX #7 & #8 (finals) in (Belgium) Blegny
  - Elite winners: (Netherlands) Joris Harmsen (m; 2 times) / (Netherlands) Laura Smulders (f; 2 times)
  - Men's Junior winners: (Netherlands) Bart van Bemmelen (#1) / (Latvia) Edvards Glazers (#2)
  - Women's Junior winner: (Netherlands) Indy Scheepers (2 times)

== Cycling - Cyclo-cross ==
=== 2017–18 International Cyclo-cross events ===
- November 4, 2017: 2017 Masters European Continental Championships in (Czech Republic) Tábor
  - Masters 30–34 winners: (Belgium) Kenny Geluykens (m) / (Czech Republic) Petra Fortelná (f)
  - Masters 35–39 winners: (Switzerland) Jürg Graf (m) / (Italy) Chiara Selva (f)
  - Masters 40–44 winners: (Italy) Massimo Folcarelli (m) / (Germany) Silke Keil (f)
  - Masters 45–49 winners: (Netherlands) Edwin Raats (m) / (Sweden) Anna Persson (f)
  - Masters 50–54 winners: (Belgium) Guido Verhaegen (m) / (Estonia) Tea Lang (f)
  - Masters 55–59 winners: (Germany) Armin Raible (m) / (Norway) Gjertrud Bø (f)
  - Men's Masters 60–64 winner: (Sweden) Benny Andersson
  - Women's Masters 60+ winner: (France) Christine Dufond-Demattei
  - Men's Masters 65–69 winner: (Switzerland) Paul Graf
  - Men's Masters 70–74 winner: (United Kingdom) Victor Barnett
- November 5, 2017: 2017 Pan American Cyclocross Championships in (United States) Louisville
  - Elite winners: (United States) Stephen Hyde (m) / (United States) Katie Compton (f)
  - U23 winners: (United States) Gage Hecht (m) / (United States) Emma White (f)
  - Men's Junior winner: (United States) Benjamín Gomez Villafañe
- November 5, 2017: 2017 Cyclocross European Championships in (Czech Republic) Tábor
  - Elite winners: (Netherlands) Mathieu van der Poel (m) / (Belgium) Sanne Cant (f)
  - U23 winners: (Belgium) Eli Iserbyt (m) / (Italy) Chiara Teocchi (f)
  - Men's Junior winner: (Switzerland) Loris Rouiller
- December 1 & 2, 2017: 2017 UCI Masters Cyclo-cross World Championships in (Belgium) Mol
  - Masters 30–34 winners: (Switzerland) Nicolas Lüthi (m) / (France) Manuella Glon (f)
  - Masters 35–39 winners: (United States) Matt Shriver (m) / (France) Viviane Rognant (f)
  - Masters 40–44 winners: (Spain) Agustín Navarro Vidal (m) / (United Kingdom) Kate Eedy (f)
  - Masters 45–49 winners: (Netherlands) Erik Dekker (m) / (United Kingdom) Helen Pattinson (f)
  - Masters 50–54 winners: (Belgium) Guido Verhaegen (m) / (United States) Elizabeth Sheldon (f)
  - Masters 55–59 winners: (Netherlands) Jos Bogaerts (m) / (Norway) Gjertrud Bø (f)
  - Masters 60–64 winners: (United Kingdom) Robin Delve (m) / (United Kingdom) Nicola Davies (f)
  - Masters 65–69 winners: (United Kingdom) Dave McMullen (m) / (France) Christine Dufond-Dematteis (f)
  - Men's Masters 70–74 winner: (United States) William Abbott
  - Masters 75+ winners: (United Kingdom) John Ginley (m) / (United States) Julie Lockhart (f)
- February 3 & 4: 2018 UCI Cyclo-cross World Championships in (Netherlands) Valkenburg aan de Geul–Limburg
  - Elite winners: (Belgium) Wout van Aert (m) / (Belgium) Sanne Cant (f)
  - U23 winners: (Belgium) Eli Iserbyt (m) / (United Kingdom) Evie Richards (f)
  - Men's Junior winner: (United Kingdom) Ben Tulett

=== 2017–18 UCI Cyclo-cross World Cup ===
- September 16: #1 in (United States) Iowa City
  - Elite winners: (Netherlands) Mathieu van der Poel (m) / (Czech Republic) Kateřina Nash (f)
- September 24: #2 in (United States) Waterloo
  - Elite winners: (Netherlands) Mathieu van der Poel (m) / (Belgium) Sanne Cant (f)
- October 22: #3 in (Belgium) Koksijde
  - Elite winners: (Netherlands) Mathieu van der Poel (m) / (Netherlands) Maud Kaptheijns (f)
  - Men's Junior winner: (Netherlands) Pim Ronhaar
  - Men's U23 winner: (United Kingdom) Tom Pidcock
- November 19: #4 in (Denmark) Bogense
  - Elite winners: (Netherlands) Mathieu van der Poel (m) / (Belgium) Sanne Cant (f)
  - Men's Junior winner: (Czech Republic) Tomáš Kopecký
  - Men's U23 winner: (United Kingdom) Tom Pidcock
- November 25: #5 in (Germany) Zeven
  - Elite winners: (Belgium) Wout van Aert (m) / (Belgium) Sanne Cant (f)
  - Men's Junior winner: (Netherlands) Pim Ronhaar
  - Men's U23 winner: (Belgium) Eli Iserbyt
- December 17: #6 in (Belgium) Namur
  - Elite winners: (Belgium) Wout van Aert (m) / (United Kingdom) Evie Richards (f)
  - Men's Junior winner: (Switzerland) Loris Rouiller
  - Men's U23 winner: (United Kingdom) Tom Pidcock
- December 26: #7 in (Belgium) Heusden-Zolder
  - Elite winners: (Netherlands) Mathieu van der Poel (m) / (Belgium) Sanne Cant (f)
  - Men's Junior winner: (Czech Republic) Tomáš Kopecký
  - Men's U23 winner: (United Kingdom) Tom Pidcock
- January 21: #8 in (France) Nommay
  - Elite winners: (Netherlands) Mathieu van der Poel (m) / (United States) Katie Compton (f)
  - Men's Junior winner: (Netherlands) Mees Hendrikx
  - Men's U23 winner: (Belgium) Thijs Aerts
- January 28: #9 (final) in (Netherlands) Hoogerheide
  - Elite winners: (Netherlands) Mathieu van der Poel (m) / (Belgium) Sanne Cant (f)
  - Men's Junior winner: (Belgium) Niels Vandeputte
  - Men's U23 winner: (Belgium) Eli Iserbyt

=== 2017–18 Cyclo-cross Superprestige ===
- October 1, 2017: #1 in (Netherlands) Gieten
  - Elite winners: (Netherlands) Mathieu van der Poel (m) / (Netherlands) Maud Kaptheijns (f)
  - Men's Junior winner: (Netherlands) Ryan Kamp
  - Men's U23 winner: (Netherlands) Jens Dekker
- October 15, 2017: #2 in (Belgium) Zonhoven
  - Elite winners: (Netherlands) Mathieu van der Poel (m) / (Netherlands) Maud Kaptheijns (f)
  - Men's Junior winner: (Netherlands) Pim Ronhaar
  - Men's U23 winner: (Netherlands) Jens Dekker
- October 21, 2017: #3 in (Belgium) Boom
  - Elite winners: (Belgium) Wout van Aert (m) / (Netherlands) Maud Kaptheijns (f)
  - Men's Junior winner: (Belgium) Xander Geysels
  - Men's U23 winner: (United Kingdom) Tom Pidcock
- October 29, 2017: #4 in (Belgium) Oostkamp
  - Elite winners: (Netherlands) Mathieu van der Poel (m) / (Netherlands) Maud Kaptheijns (f)
  - Men's Junior winner: (Netherlands) Ryan Kamp
  - Men's U23 winner: (Netherlands) Jens Dekker
- November 12, 2017: #5 in (Belgium) Gavere
  - Elite winners: (Belgium) Wout van Aert (m) / (Belgium) Ellen Van Loy (f)
  - Men's Junior winner: (Netherlands) Pim Ronhaar
  - Men's U23 winner: (United Kingdom) Tom Pidcock
- December 30, 2017: #6 in (Belgium) Diegem
  - Elite winners: (Netherlands) Mathieu van der Poel (m) / (Belgium) Sanne Cant (f)
  - Men's Junior winner: (Switzerland) Loris Rouiller
  - Men's U23 winner: (United Kingdom) Tom Pidcock
- February 11, 2018: #7 in (Belgium) Hoogstraten
  - Elite winners: (Netherlands) Mathieu van der Poel (m) / (Belgium) Sanne Cant (f)
  - Men's Junior winner: (Netherlands) Ryan Kamp
  - Men's U23 winner: (Belgium) Eli Iserbyt
- February 17, 2018: #8 in (Belgium) Middelkerke
  - Elite winners: (Netherlands) Mathieu van der Poel (m) / (Belgium) Sanne Cant (f)
  - Men's Junior winner: (Belgium) Niels Vandeputte
  - Men's U23 winner: (United Kingdom) Tom Pidcock

=== 2017–18 DVV Trophy ===
- October 8: #1 in (Belgium) Ronse
  - Elite winners: (Netherlands) Lars van der Haar (m) / (United States) Katie Compton (f)
  - Men's Junior winner: (Switzerland) Loris Rouiller
  - Men's U23 winner: (Belgium) Eli Iserbyt
- November 1: #2 in (Belgium) Melden
  - Elite winners: (Netherlands) Mathieu van der Poel (m) / (United Kingdom) Helen Wyman (f)
  - Men's Junior winner: (United Kingdom) Ben Tulett
  - Men's U23 winner: (United Kingdom) Tom Pidcock
- November 26: #3 in (Belgium) Hamme
  - Elite winners: (Netherlands) Mathieu van der Poel (m) / (Belgium) Sanne Cant (f)
  - Men's Junior winner: (Switzerland) Loris Rouiller
  - Men's U23 winner: (Belgium) Eli Iserbyt
- December 9: #4 in (Belgium) Essen
  - Elite winners: (Netherlands) Mathieu van der Poel (m) / (Belgium) Sanne Cant (f)
  - Men's Junior winner: (Belgium) Jarno Bellens
  - Men's U23 winner: (Belgium) Eli Iserbyt
- December 16: #5 in (Belgium) Antwerp
  - Elite winners: (Netherlands) Mathieu van der Poel (m) / (Belgium) Sanne Cant (f)
  - Men's Junior winner: (Belgium) Wout Vervoort
  - Men's U23 winner: (Belgium) Eli Iserbyt
- December 28: #6 in (Belgium) Loenhout
  - Elite winners: (Netherlands) Mathieu van der Poel (m) / (Belgium) Sanne Cant (f)
  - Men's Junior winner: (Belgium) Ryan Cortjens
  - Men's U23 winner: (Belgium) Eli Iserbyt
- January 1: #7 in (Belgium) Baal
  - Elite winners: (Netherlands) Mathieu van der Poel (m) / (United States) Katie Compton (f)
  - Men's Junior winner: (Switzerland) Loris Rouiller
  - Men's U23 winner: (Belgium) Eli Iserbyt
- February 10: #8 in (Belgium) Lille
  - Elite winners: (Netherlands) Mathieu van der Poel (m) / (Belgium) Sanne Cant (f)
  - Men's Junior winner: (Belgium) Niels Vandeputte
  - Men's U23 winner: (Belgium) Eli Iserbyt

== Cycling - Mountain Bike ==
=== International mountain biking events ===
- February 9–11: 2018 Oceania Mountain Bike Championships (XCO & DHI) in (New Zealand) Dunedin
  - Elite XCO winners: (New Zealand) Anton Cooper (m) / (Australia) Samara Sheppard (f)
  - Junior XCO winners: (Australia) Cameron Wright (m) / (New Zealand) Phoebe Young (f)
  - U23 XCO winners: (New Zealand) Eden Cruise (m) / (New Zealand) Charlotte Rayner (f)
  - Elite Downhill winners: (New Zealand) Samuel Blenkinsop (m) / (New Zealand) Virginia Armstrong (f)
- April 4–8: 2018 Pan American Mountain Bike Championships (XCO, XCE, & XCR) in Pereira
  - Elite XCO winners: (Brazil) Luiz Henrique Cocuzzi (m) / (Brazil) Raiza Goulão (f)
  - Junior XCO winners: (Chile) Martin Vidaurre Kossman (m) / (Mexico) Fatima Anahi Hijar Marin (f)
  - Men's U23 XCO winner: (Mexico) Jose Gerardo Ulloa Arevalo
  - Elite XCE winners: (Colombia) Juan Fernando Monroy (m) / (Ecuador) Michela Molina (f)
  - Mixed Elite XCR winners: Colombia
- April 7: 2018 European Mountain Bike Championships (DHI only) in (Portugal) Lousã
  - Elite Downhill winners: (Portugal) Francisco Pardal (m) / (Slovenia) Monika Hrastnik (f)
- April 22: 2018 European Mountain Bike Championships (XCM only) in (Italy) Spilimbergo
  - Elite XCM winners: (Russia) Alexey Medvedev (m) / (Norway) Gunn-Rita Dahle Flesjå (f)
- May 2–6: 2018 Asian Mountain Bike Championships (XCO, XCR, & DHI) in (Philippines) Danao, Cebu
  - Elite XCO winners: (Japan) Kohei Yamamoto (m) / (China) LI Hongfeng (f)
  - Junior XCO winners: (China) YUAN Jinwei (m) / (Japan) Urara Kawaguchi (f)
  - U23 XCO winners: (China) LYU Xianjing (m) / (Philippines) Ariana Thea Patrice Dormitorio (f)
  - Elite Downhill winners: (Chinese Taipei) CHIANG Sheng Shan (m) / (Thailand) Vipavee Deekaballes (f)
  - Mixed Elite XCR winners: China
- June 30: 2018 European Mountain Bike Championships (Ultra XCM only) in (Spain) Vielha-Val d'Aran
  - Elite XCM winners: (Spain) Joseba Albizu (m) / (Spain) Clara Fernandez Chafer (f)
- July 26–29: 2018 European Mountain Bike Championships (XCO, XCE for U23/Juniors, & XCR) in (Austria) Graz-Stattegg
  - Elite XCE winners: (France) Titouan Perrin-Ganier (m) / (Ukraine) Iryna Popova (f)
  - Mixed Elite XCR winners: Italy
  - Junior XCO winners: (Switzerland) Alexandre Balmer (m) / (Austria) Laura Stigger (f)
  - U23 XCO winners: (France) Joshua Dubau (m) / (Switzerland) Sina Frei (f)
- August 7: 2018 European Mountain Bike Championships (XCO Elite only) in (United Kingdom) Glasgow
  - Elite XCO winners: (Switzerland) Lars Förster (m) / (Switzerland) Jolanda Neff (f)
- September 4–9: 2018 UCI Mountain Bike World Championships in Lenzerheide
  - Elite XCO winners: (Switzerland) Nino Schurter (m) / (United States) Kate Courtney (f)
  - Junior XCO winners: (Switzerland) Alexandre Balmer (m) / (Austria) Laura Stigger (f)
  - U23 XCO winners: (South Africa) Alan Hatherly (m) / (Switzerland) Alessandra Keller (f)
  - Elite Downhill winners: (France) Loïc Bruni (m) / (United Kingdom) Rachel Atherton (f)
  - Junior Downhill winners: (United Kingdom) Kade Edwards (m) / (Austria) Valentina Höll (f)
  - Mixed Elite XCO winners: Switzerland
- September 14 & 15: 2018 UCI Mountain Bike Marathon World Championships in (Italy) Auronzo di Cadore
  - Elite XCM winners: (Brazil) Henrique Avancini (m) / (Denmark) Annika Langvad (f)
- October 12–14: 2018 Pan American Mountain Bike Championships (DHI only) in (Colombia) Manizales
  - Elite Downhill winners: (Colombia) Rafael Gutiérrez Villegas (m) / (El Salvador) Mariana Salazar (f)

=== 2018 UCI Mountain Bike World Cup ===
- March 10: #1 in (South Africa) Stellenbosch (XCO only)
  - Elite winners: (New Zealand) Sam Gaze (m) / (Denmark) Annika Langvad (f)
  - U23 winners: (Norway) Petter Fagerhaug (m) / (Denmark) Malene Degn (f)
- April 21 & 22: #2 in (Croatia) Lošinj (DHI only)
  - Elite winners: (United States) Aaron Gwin (m) / (France) Myriam Nicole (f)
  - Junior winners: (France) Thibaut Daprela (m) / (Austria) Valentina Höll (f)
- May 19 & 20: #3 in (Germany) Albstadt (XCO & XCC)
  - Elite XCO winners: (Switzerland) Nino Schurter (m) / (Switzerland) Jolanda Neff (f)
  - U23 XCO winners: (France) Joshua Dubau (m) / (Switzerland) Sina Frei (f)
  - Elite Short Circuit XC winners: (Netherlands) Mathieu van der Poel (m) / (Denmark) Annika Langvad (f)
- May 26 & 27: #4 in (Czech Republic) Nové Město na Moravě (XCO & XCC)
  - Elite XCO winners: (Switzerland) Nino Schurter (m) / (Denmark) Annika Langvad (f)
  - U23 XCO winners: (Romania) Vlad Dascalu (m) / (Switzerland) Sina Frei (f)
  - Elite Short Circuit XC winners: (New Zealand) Sam Gaze (m) / (Denmark) Annika Langvad (f)
- June 2 & 3: #5 in (United Kingdom) Fort William (DHI only)
  - Elite winners: (France) Amaury Pierron (m) / (United Kingdom) Tahnee Seagrave (f)
  - Junior winners: (Australia) Kye A'Hern (m) / (Austria) Valentina Höll (f)
- June 9 & 10: #6 in (Austria) Leogang (DHI only)
  - Elite winners: (France) Amaury Pierron (m) / (United Kingdom) Rachel Atherton (f)
  - Junior winners: (Australia) Kye A'Hern (m) / (Austria) Valentina Höll (f)
- July 7 & 8: #7 in (Italy) Val di Sole (XCO, DHI, & XCC)
  - Elite XCO winners: (Switzerland) Nino Schurter (m) / (Poland) Maja Włoszczowska (f)
  - U23 XCO winners: (Norway) Petter Fagerhaug (m) / (Switzerland) Sina Frei (f)
  - Elite Short Circuit XC winners: (Netherlands) Mathieu van der Poel (m) / (Denmark) Annika Langvad (f)
  - Elite Downhill winners: (France) Amaury Pierron (m) / (United Kingdom) Tahnee Seagrave (f)
  - Junior Downhill winners: (France) Thibaut Daprela (m) / (Austria) Valentina Höll (f)
- July 14 & 15: #8 in (Andorra) Vallnord (XCO, DHI, & XCC)
  - Elite XCO winners: (Italy) Gerhard Kerschbaumer (m) / (Norway) Gunn-Rita Dahle Flesjå (f)
  - U23 XCO winners: (France) Joshua Dubau (m) / (Switzerland) Sina Frei (f)
  - Elite Short Circuit XC winners: (Brazil) Henrique Avancini (m) / (Switzerland) Alessandra Keller (f)
  - Elite Downhill winners: (France) Loris Vergier (m) / (United Kingdom) Tahnee Seagrave (f)
  - Junior Downhill winners: (France) Thibaut Daprela (m) / (Austria) Valentina Höll (f)
- August 10–12: #9 in (Canada) Mont-Sainte-Anne (XCO, XCC, & DHI)
  - Elite XCO winners: (Switzerland) Mathias Flückiger (m) / (Switzerland) Jolanda Neff (f)
  - U23 XCO winners: (South Africa) Alan Hatherly (m) / (Switzerland) Sina Frei (f)
  - Elite Short Circuit XC winners: (New Zealand) Sam Gaze (m) / (Denmark) Annika Langvad (f)
  - Elite Downhill winners: (France) Loïc Bruni (m) / (United Kingdom) Rachel Atherton (f)
  - Junior Downhill winners: (France) Thibaut Daprela (m) / (Austria) Valentina Höll (f)
- August 25 & 26: #10 (final) in (France) La Bresse (XCO, XCC, & DHI)
  - Elite XCO winners: (Switzerland) Nino Schurter (m) / (Switzerland) Jolanda Neff (f)
  - U23 XCO winners: (Norway) Petter Fagerhaug (m) / (Switzerland) Sina Frei (f)
  - Elite Short Circuit XC winners: (Netherlands) Mathieu van der Poel (m) / (Denmark) Annika Langvad (f)
  - Elite Downhill winners: (Belgium) Martin Maes (m) / (United Kingdom) Rachel Atherton (f)
  - Junior Downhill winners: (France) Thibaut Daprela (m) / (Austria) Valentina Höll (f)

== Cycling - Para-cycling ==
- Note: For all the detailed results for the events below, click here.
- February 17–19: 2018 Asian Para-Cycling Championships (Track) in (Malaysia) Nilai
- March 22–25: 2018 UCI Para-cycling Track World Championships (Track) in (Brazil) Rio de Janeiro
- May 3–6: 2018 UCI Para-cycling Road World Cup #1 (Road) in (Belgium) Ostend
- July 6–8: 2018 UCI Para-cycling Road World Cup #2 (Road) in (Netherlands) Emmen
- August 2–5: 2018 UCI Para-cycling Road World Championships (Road) in (Italy) Maniago
- August 15–19: 2018 UCI Para-cycling Road World Cup #3 (Road) in (Canada) Baie-Comeau

== Cycling - Road ==
=== 2018 Grand Tour Events ===
- May 4–27: 2018 Giro d'Italia
  - Winner: (United Kingdom) Chris Froome (first Giro d'Italia win & sixth Grand Tour win)
- July 7–29: 2018 Tour de France
  - Winner: (United Kingdom) Geraint Thomas (first Tour de France win & first Grand Tour win)
- August 25 – September 16: 2018 Vuelta a España
  - Winner: (United Kingdom) Simon Yates (first Vuelta a España win & first Grand Tour win)

=== International road cycling events ===
- February 8–10: 2018 Asian Cycling Championships in (Myanmar) Naypyidaw
  - Elite Individual road race winners: (United Arab Emirates) Yousif Mirza (m) / (Vietnam) Nguyễn Thị Thật (f)
  - U23 Individual road race winners: (Japan) Masaki Yamamoto (m) / (China) Zixin Liu (f)
  - Juniors Individual road race winners: (Japan) Taisei Hino (m) / (Hong Kong) Vivien Chiu (f)
  - Elite Individual time trial winners: (Hong Kong) Cheung King Lok (m) / (South Korea) Lee Ju-mi (f)
  - U23 Individual time trial winners: (China) Hang Shi (m) / (China) Zixin Liu (f)
  - Juniors Individual time trial winners: (Kazakhstan) Daniil Pronskiy (m) / (Kazakhstan) Marina Kurnossova (f)
  - Men's Team time trial winners: Japan (Yukiya Arashiro, Fumiyuki Beppu, Rei Onodera, Masaki Yamamoto, Shoi Matsuda, Yusuke Hatanaka)
- February 13–18: 2018 African Continental Road Cycling Championships in Rwanda
  - Elite Individual Road Race winners: (Eritrea) Amanuel Ghebreigzabhier Werkilul (m) / (Eritrea) Bisrat Ghebremeskel (f)
  - Juniors Individual Road Race winners: (Eritrea) Biniam Hailu (m) / (Eritrea) Desiet Tekeste (f)
  - Elite Individual time trial winners: (Eritrea) Mekseb Debesay (m) / (Eritrea) Mossana Debesay (f)
  - Juniors Individual time trial winners: (Eritrea) Biniam Hailu (m) / (Eritrea) Desiet Tekeste (f)
  - Elite Team time trial winners: Eritrea (Amanuel Ghebreigzabhier Werkilul, Saymon Musie Mehari, Mekseb Debesay, Metkel Eyob) / Ethiopia (Eyeru Tesfoam Gebru, Tsega Gebre Beyene, Selam Amha)
  - Juniors Team time trial winners: Eritrea (Biniam Hailu, Hager Mesfin, Tomas Yosief) (m) / Rwanda (Samantha Mushimiyimana, Violette Irakoze, Valantine Nzayisenga, Jeanette Manishimwe)
- March 23–25: 2018 Oceania Cycling Championships in (Australia) Tasmania
  - Elite Individual Road Race winners: (Australia) Chris Harper (m) / (New Zealand) Sharlotte Lucas (f)
  - Elite Individual Time Trial winners: (New Zealand) Hamish Bond (m) / (Australia) Grace Brown (f)
  - Junior Individual Road Race winners: (Australia) Carter Turnbull (m) / (Australia) Sarah Gigante (f)
  - Junior Individual Time Trial winners: (Australia) Lucas Plapp (m) / (Australia) Anya Louw (f)
  - U23 Individual Time Trial winners: (New Zealand) Jake Marryatt (m) / (New Zealand) Mikayla Harvey (f)
- May 3–6: 2018 Pan American Road Cycling Championships in (Argentina) San Juan
  - Elite Individual Road Race winners: (Colombia) Juan Sebastián Molano (m) / (Cuba) Arlenis Sierra (f)
  - Elite Individual Time Trial winners: (Colombia) Walter Vargas (m) / (United States) Amber Neben (f)
  - Men's U23 winners: (Argentina) Federico Nicolas Vivas (IRR) / (Chile) Diego Agustin Ferreyra Geldrez (ITT)
- July 12–15: 2018 UEC Juniors & U23 Road European Championships in Czech Republic
  - Junior Individual Time Trial winners: (Belgium) Remco Evenepoel (m) / (Italy) Vittoria Guazzini (f)
  - Junior Women's Individual Road Race winner: (Russia) Aigul Gareeva
  - U23 Individual Time Trial winners: (Italy) Edoardo Affini (m) / (Netherlands) Aafke Soet (f)
  - Women's U23 Individual Road Race winner: (Czech Republic) Nikola Nosková
- August 5–12: 2018 European Road Championships in (United Kingdom) Glasgow
  - Elite Individual Road Race winners: (Italy) Matteo Trentin (m) / (Italy) Marta Bastianelli (f)
  - Elite Individual Time Trial winners: (Belgium) Victor Campenaerts (m) / (Netherlands) Ellen van Dijk (f)
  - Junior Men's Individual Road Race & Time Trial winner: (Belgium) Remco Evenepoel
  - Junior Women's Individual Road Race winner: (Russia) Aigul Gareeva
  - Junior Women's Individual Time Trial winner: (Italy) Vittoria Guazzini
  - U23 Individual Road Race winners: (Switzerland) Marc Hirschi (m) / (Czech Republic) Nikola Nosková (f)
  - U23 Individual Time Trial winners: (Italy) Edoardo Affini (m) / (Netherlands) Aafke Soet (f)
- September 23–30: 2018 UCI Road World Championships in (Austria) Innsbruck
  - Elite Road Race winners: (Spain) Alejandro Valverde (m) / (Netherlands) Anna van der Breggen (f)
  - Elite Individual Time Trial winners: (Australia) Rohan Dennis (m) / (Netherlands) Annemiek van Vleuten (f)
  - Elite Team Time Trial winners: (Belgium) Quick-Step Floors (m) / (Germany) Canyon–SRAM (f)
  - Junior Road Race winners: (Belgium) Remco Evenepoel (m) / (Austria) Laura Stigger (f)
  - Junior Time Trial winners: (Belgium) Remco Evenepoel (m) / (Netherlands) Rozemarijn Ammerlaan (f)
  - Men's U23 winners: (Switzerland) Marc Hirschi (Road Race) / (Denmark) Mikkel Bjerg (Time Trial)

=== 2018 UCI World Tour ===
- January 16–21: (Australia) 2018 Tour Down Under Winner: (South Africa) Daryl Impey (Mitchelton–Scott)
- January 28: (Australia) 2018 Great Ocean Road Race Winner: (Australia) Jay McCarthy (Bora–Hansgrohe)
- February 21–25: (United Arab Emirates) 2018 Abu Dhabi Tour Winner: (Spain) Alejandro Valverde (Movistar Team)
- February 24: (Belgium) 2018 Omloop Het Nieuwsblad Winner: (Denmark) Michael Valgren (Astana)
- March 3: (Italy) 2018 Strade Bianche Winner: (Belgium) Tiesj Benoot (Lotto–Soudal)
- March 4–11: (France) 2018 Paris–Nice Winner: (Spain) Marc Soler (Movistar Team)
- March 7–13: (Italy) 2018 Tirreno–Adriatico Winner: (Poland) Michał Kwiatkowski (Team Sky)
- March 17: (Italy) 2018 Milan–San Remo Winner: (Italy) Vincenzo Nibali (Bahrain–Merida)
- March 19–25: (Spain) 2018 Volta a Catalunya Winner: (Spain) Alejandro Valverde (Movistar Team)
- March 23: (Belgium) 2018 E3 Harelbeke Winner: (Netherlands) Niki Terpstra (Quick-Step Floors)
- March 25: (Belgium) 2018 Gent–Wevelgem Winner: (Slovakia) Peter Sagan (Bora–Hansgrohe)
- March 28: (Belgium) 2018 Dwars door Vlaanderen Winner: (Belgium) Yves Lampaert (Quick-Step Floors)
- April 1: (Belgium) 2018 Tour of Flanders Winner: (Netherlands) Niki Terpstra (Quick-Step Floors)
- April 2–7: (Spain) 2018 Tour of the Basque Country Winner: (Slovenia) Primož Roglič (LottoNL–Jumbo)
- April 8: (France) 2018 Paris–Roubaix Winner: (Slovakia) Peter Sagan (Bora–Hansgrohe)
- April 15: (Netherlands) 2018 Amstel Gold Race Winner: (Denmark) Michael Valgren (Astana)
- April 18: (Belgium) 2018 La Flèche Wallonne Winner: (France) Julian Alaphilippe (Quick-Step Floors)
- April 22: (Belgium) 2018 Liège–Bastogne–Liège Winner: (Luxembourg) Bob Jungels (Quick-Step Floors)
- April 24–29: (Switzerland) 2018 Tour de Romandie Winner: (Slovenia) Primož Roglič (LottoNL–Jumbo)
- May 1: (Germany) 2018 Eschborn–Frankfurt Winner: (Norway) Alexander Kristoff (UAE Team Emirates)
- May 13–19: (United States) 2018 Tour of California Winner: (Colombia) Egan Bernal (Team Sky)
- June 3–10: (France) 2018 Critérium du Dauphiné Winner: (United Kingdom) Geraint Thomas (Team Sky)
- June 9–17: (Switzerland) 2018 Tour de Suisse Winner: (Australia) Richie Porte (BMC Racing Team)
- July 29: (United Kingdom) 2018 London–Surrey Classic Winner: (Germany) Pascal Ackermann (Bora–Hansgrohe)
- August 4: (Spain) 2018 Clásica de San Sebastián Winner: (France) Julian Alaphilippe (Quick-Step Floors)
- August 4–10: (Poland) 2018 Tour de Pologne Winner: (Poland) Michał Kwiatkowski (Team Sky)
- August 13–19: (Belgium) / (Netherlands) 2018 BinckBank Tour Winner: (Slovenia) Matej Mohorič (Bahrain–Merida)
- August 19: (Germany) 2018 EuroEyes Cyclassics Winner: (Italy) Elia Viviani (Quick-Step Floors)
- August 26: 2018 Bretagne Classic Ouest–France Winner: (Belgium) Oliver Naesen (AG2R La Mondiale)
- September 7: (Canada) 2018 Grand Prix Cycliste de Québec Winner: (Australia) Michael Matthews (Team Sunweb)
- September 9: (Canada) 2018 Grand Prix Cycliste de Montréal Winner: (Australia) Michael Matthews (Team Sunweb)
- October 9 – 14: 2018 Presidential Tour of Turkey Winner: (Spain) Eduard Prades (Euskadi–Murias)
- October 13: (Italy) 2018 Il Lombardia Winner: (France) Thibaut Pinot (Groupama–FDJ)
- October 16–21: (China) 2018 Tour of Guangxi (final) Winner: (Italy) Gianni Moscon (Team Sky)

=== 2018 UCI Women's World Tour ===
- March 3: (Italy) 2018 Strade Bianche Donne Winner: (Netherlands) Anna van der Breggen (Boels–Dolmans)
- March 11: (Netherlands) 2018 Ronde van Drenthe Winner: (Netherlands) Amy Pieters (Boels–Dolmans)
- March 18: (Italy) 2018 Trofeo Alfredo Binda-Comune di Cittiglio Winner: (Poland) Katarzyna Niewiadoma (Canyon–SRAM)
- March 22: (Belgium) 2018 Three Days of Bruges–De Panne Winner: (Belgium) Jolien D'Hoore (Mitchelton–Scott)
- March 25: (Belgium) 2018 Gent–Wevelgem Winner: (Italy) Marta Bastianelli (Alé–Cipollini)
- April 1: (Belgium) 2018 Tour of Flanders for Women Winner: (Netherlands) Anna van der Breggen (Boels–Dolmans)
- April 15: (Netherlands) 2018 Amstel Gold Race Winner: (Netherlands) Chantal Blaak (Boels–Dolmans)
- April 18: (Belgium) 2018 Flèche Wallonne Winner: (Netherlands) Anna van der Breggen (Boels–Dolmans)
- April 22: (Belgium) 2018 Liège–Bastogne–Liège Winner: (Netherlands) Anna van der Breggen (Boels–Dolmans)
- April 26–28: (China) 2018 Tour of Chongming Island Winner: (Germany) Charlotte Becker (Hitec Products–Birk Sport)
- May 17–19: (United States) 2018 Tour of California Winner: (United States) Katie Hall (UnitedHealthcare)
- May 19–22: (Spain) 2018 Emakumeen Euskal Bira Winner: (Australia) Amanda Spratt (Mitchelton–Scott)
- June 13–17: (United Kingdom) 2018 The Women's Tour Winner: (United States) Coryn Rivera (Team Sunweb)
- July 6–15: (Italy) 2018 Giro Rosa Winner: (Netherlands) Annemiek van Vleuten (Mitchelton–Scott)
- July 17: 2018 La Course by Le Tour de France Winner: (Netherlands) Annemiek van Vleuten (Mitchelton–Scott)
- July 28: (United Kingdom) 2018 RideLondon Winner: (Netherlands) Kirsten Wild (Wiggle High5)
- August 11: (Sweden) 2018 Crescent Women World Cup Vårgårda TTT Winners: Boels–Dolmans
- August 13: (Sweden) 2018 Open de Suède Vårgårda Road Race Winner: (Netherlands) Marianne Vos (WaowDeals Pro Cycling)
- August 16: 2018 Ladies Tour of Norway TTT Winners: Team Sunweb
- August 17–19: 2018 Ladies Tour of Norway Road Race Winner: (Netherlands) Marianne Vos (WaowDeals Pro Cycling)
- August 25: (France) 2018 GP de Plouay – Bretagne Winner: (Netherlands) Amy Pieters (Boels–Dolmans)
- August 28 – September 2: (Netherlands) 2018 Holland Ladies Tour Winner: (Netherlands) Annemiek van Vleuten (Mitchelton–Scott)
- September 15 & 16: (Spain) 2018 La Madrid Challenge by La Vuelta Winner: (Netherlands) Ellen van Dijk (Team Sunweb)
- October 21: (China) 2018 Tour of Guangxi Women's WorldTour Race (final) Winner: (Cuba) Arlenis Sierra (Astana Women's Team)

== Cycling - Track ==
=== International track cycling events ===
- November 20–23, 2017: 2018 Oceania Track Championships in (New Zealand) Cambridge
  - For all results, click here.
- February 7–10: 2018 African Track Championships in (Morocco) Casablanca
  - Elite Keirin winners: (South Africa) Jean Spies (m) / (Egypt) Ebtissam Mohamed (f)
  - Elite Points Race winners: (South Africa) Steven van Heerden (m) / (Egypt) Ebtissam Mohamed (f)
  - Elite Pursuit winners: (South Africa) Gert Fouche (m) / (Egypt) Ebtissam Mohamed (f)
  - Elite Scratch winners: (Algeria) Yacine Chalel (m) / (Egypt) Ebtissam Mohamed (f)
  - Elite Sprint winners: (South Africa) Jean Spies (m) / (Egypt) Ebtissam Mohamed (f)
  - Elite Team Pursuit winners: South Africa (m) / Egypt (f)
  - Elite Team Sprint winners: South Africa (m) / Egypt (f)
  - Men's Elite Time Trial winner: (South Africa) Jean Spies
  - Junior Keirin winners: (Algeria) Youcef Boukhari (m) / (South Africa) Courtney Smith (f)
  - Junior Pursuit winners: (Egypt) Assem Elhosseiny Khalil (m) / (South Africa) Courtney Smith (f)
  - Junior Sprint winners: (Algeria) Youcef Boukhari (m) / (South Africa) Courtney Smith (f)
  - Junior Time Trial winners: (Egypt) Mohamed Farag (m) / (South Africa) Courtney Smith (f)
  - Men's Junior Points Race winners: (Egypt) Youssef Abouelhassan
  - Men's Junior Scratch winners: (Algeria) Youcef Boukhari
  - Men's Junior Team Pursuit winners: Egypt
  - Men's Junior Team Sprint winners: Egypt
- February 16–20: 2018 Asian Track Cycling Championships in (Malaysia) Nilai
  - Elite Individual Pursuit winners: (Japan) Ryo Chikatani (m) / (South Korea) Lee Ju-mi (f)
  - Elite Keirin winners: (Japan) Tomoyuki Kawabata (m) / (Hong Kong) Lee Wai Sze (f)
  - Elite Madison winners: Hong Kong (Cheung King Lok & Leung Chun Wing) (m) / Japan (Kisato Nakamura & Yumi Kajihara) (f)
  - Elite Omnium winners: (Japan) Eiya Hashimoto (m) / (Japan) Yumi Kajihara (f)
  - Elite Points Race winners: (United Arab Emirates) Yousif Mirza (m) / (Malaysia) Jupha Somnet (f)
  - Elite Scratch winners: (China) GUO Liang (m) / (Chinese Taipei) Huang Ting-ying (f)
  - Elite Sprint winners: (Japan) Kazunari Watanabe (m) / (Hong Kong) Lee Wai Sze (f)
  - Elite Time Trial winners: (Japan) Tomohiro Fukaya (m) / (Hong Kong) Lee Wai Sze (f)
  - Elite Team Pursuit winners: Japan (m) / Japan (f)
  - Elite Team Sprint winners: South Korea (m) / China (f)
- February 28 – March 4: 2018 UCI Track Cycling World Championships in Apeldoorn
  - The Netherlands won both the gold and overall medal tallies.

=== 2017–18 UCI Track Cycling World Cup ===
- November 3–5, 2017: TCWC #1 in (Poland) Pruszków
  - Keirin winners: (Netherlands) Matthijs Büchli (m) / (Germany) Kristina Vogel (f)
  - Madison winners: Australia (Callum Scotson & Cameron Meyer) (m) / Belgium (Lotte Kopecky & Jolien D'Hoore) (f)
  - Omnium winners: (Denmark) Niklas Larsen (m) / (Netherlands) Kirsten Wild (f)
  - Points Race winners: (Kazakhstan) Nikita Panassenko (m) / (Belgium) Lotte Kopecky (f)
  - Scratch winners: (Belgium) Robbe Ghys (m) / (Russia) Maria Averina (f)
  - Sprint winners: (Australia) Matthew Glaetzer (m) / (Germany) Kristina Vogel (f)
  - Team Pursuit winners: Italy (m) / Italy (f)
  - Team Sprint winners: Netherlands (m) / Germany (f)
  - Women's Individual Pursuit winner: (Poland) Justyna Kaczkowska
- November 10–12, 2017: TCWC #2 in (United Kingdom) Manchester
  - Men's 1 km Time Trial winner: (Australia) Matthew Glaetzer
  - Women's 500 m Time Trial winner: (Russia) Daria Shmeleva
  - Keirin winners: (Netherlands) Matthijs Büchli (m) / (Germany) Kristina Vogel (f)
  - Madison winners: Denmark (Niklas Larsen & Casper von Folsach) (m) / Great Britain (Elinor Barker & Katie Archibald) (f)
  - Omnium winners: (France) Benjamin Thomas (m) / (United States) Jennifer Valente (f)
  - Scratch winners: (Kazakhstan) Nikita Panassenko (m) / (Italy) Rachele Barbieri (f)
  - Sprint winners: (Netherlands) Harrie Lavreysen (m) / (Germany) Kristina Vogel (f)
  - Team Pursuit winners: Great Britain (m) / Great Britain (f)
  - Team Sprint winners: Germany (m) / Germany (f)
- December 1–3, 2017: TCWC #3 in Milton, Ontario
  - Keirin winners: (Netherlands) Harrie Lavreysen (m) / (Germany) Kristina Vogel (f)
  - Madison winners: Belgium (Kenny De Ketele & Lindsay De Vylder) (m) / Great Britain (Katie Archibald & Ellie Dickinson) (f)
  - Omnium winners: (Denmark) Niklas Larsen (m) / (Japan) Yumi Kajihara (f)
  - Points Race winners: (Denmark) Niklas Larsen (m) / (United Kingdom) Katie Archibald (f)
  - Sprint winners: (Netherlands) Jeffrey Hoogland (m) / (Germany) Kristina Vogel (f)
  - Team Pursuit winners: New Zealand (m) / Canada (f)
  - Team Sprint winners: New Zealand (m) / Germany (f)
- December 9 & 10, 2017: TCWC #4 in (Chile) Santiago
  - Keirin winners: (Japan) Yuta Wakimoto (m) / (United States) Madalyn Godby (f)
  - Madison winners: New Zealand (Thomas Sexton & Campbell Stewart) (m) / New Zealand (Michaela Drummond & Racquel Sheath) (f)
  - Omnium winners: (United States) Daniel Holloway (m) / (Japan) Yumi Kajihara (f)
  - Sprint winners: (Lithuania) Vasilijus Lendel (m) / (Ukraine) Lyubov Shulika (f)
  - Team Pursuit winners: New Zealand (m) / New Zealand (f)
  - Team Sprint winners: Russia (m) / Ukraine (f)
- January 19–21: TCWC #5 (final) in (Belarus) Minsk
  - Keirin winners: (Netherlands) Matthijs Büchli (m) / (Belgium) Nicky Degrendele (f)
  - Madison winners: Hong Kong (Leung Chun Wing & Cheung King Lok) (m) / Italy (Letizia Paternoster & Maria Giulia Confalonieri) (f)
  - Omnium winners: (Netherlands) Jan-Willem van Schip (m) / (Netherlands) Kirsten Wild (f)
  - Points Race winners: (Netherlands) Jan-Willem van Schip (m) / (Netherlands) Kirsten Wild (f)
  - Scratch winners: (Belarus) Yauheni Karaliok (m) / (Switzerland) Aline Seitz (f)
  - Sprint winners: (Netherlands) Matthijs Büchli (m) / (Germany) Pauline Grabosch (f)
  - Team Pursuit winners: (United Kingdom) Team KGF (m) / United States (f)
  - Team Sprint winners: (Netherlands) Beat Cycling Club (m) / Germany (f)
  - Men's Individual Pursuit winner: (United Kingdom) Charlie Tanfield

== Cycling - Trials ==
=== International trials cycling events ===
- April 30: 2018 Asian Trials Continental Championships in (Japan) Saku
  - Elite 20" winners: (Japan) Kazuki Terai (m) / (Japan) Kana Yokota (f)
  - Elite Men's 26" winner: (Japan) Tomu Shiozaki
  - Junior Men's winners: (Japan) Yuki Taniguchi (20" & default) / (Japan) Taichi Omata (26")
- July 20 & 21: 2018 UEC Trials European Continental Championships in (Switzerland) Moudon
  - Men's Elite winners: (Spain) Ion Areitio Agirre (20") / (United Kingdom) Jack Carthy (26")
  - Junior Men's winners: (Spain) Alejandro Montalvo Milla (20") / (Germany) Oliver Widmann (26")
  - Women's Open winner: (Germany) Nina Reichenbach
- November 5–11: 2018 UCI Urban Cycling World Championships (Trials) in (China) Chengdu
  - Men's 20" winners: (Austria) Thomas Pechhacker (Elite) / (Spain) Alejandro Montalvo Milla (Junior)
  - Men's 26" winners: (United Kingdom) Jack Carthy (Elite) / (Germany) Oliver Widmann (Junior)
  - Women's Open winner: (Germany) Nina Reichenbach

=== 2018 UCI Trials World Cup ===
- July 7 & 8: #1 in (Austria) Vöcklabruck
  - Men's Elite 20" winner: (Spain) Benito Jose Ros Charral
  - Men's Elite 26" winner: (United Kingdom) Jack Carthy
  - Women's Elite winner: (Germany) Nina Reichenbach
- August 25 & 26: #2 in (Italy) Val di Sole
  - Men's Elite 20" winner: (Spain) Alejandro Montalvo Milla
  - Men's Elite 26" winner: (France) Nicolas Vallee
  - Women's Elite winner: (Germany) Nina Reichenbach
- September 22 & 23: #3 in (Belgium) Antwerp
  - Men's Elite 20" winner: (Spain) Alejandro Montalvo Milla
  - Men's Elite 26" winner: (United Kingdom) Jack Carthy
  - Women's Elite winner: (Germany) Nina Reichenbach
- October 13 & 14: #4 (final) in (Germany) Berlin
  - Men's Elite 20" winner: (Germany) Dominik Oswald
  - Men's Elite 26" winner: (France) Nicolas Vallee
  - Women's Elite winner: (Germany) Nina Reichenbach
