= Ylber Sefa =

Albanian cyclist (born 1991)

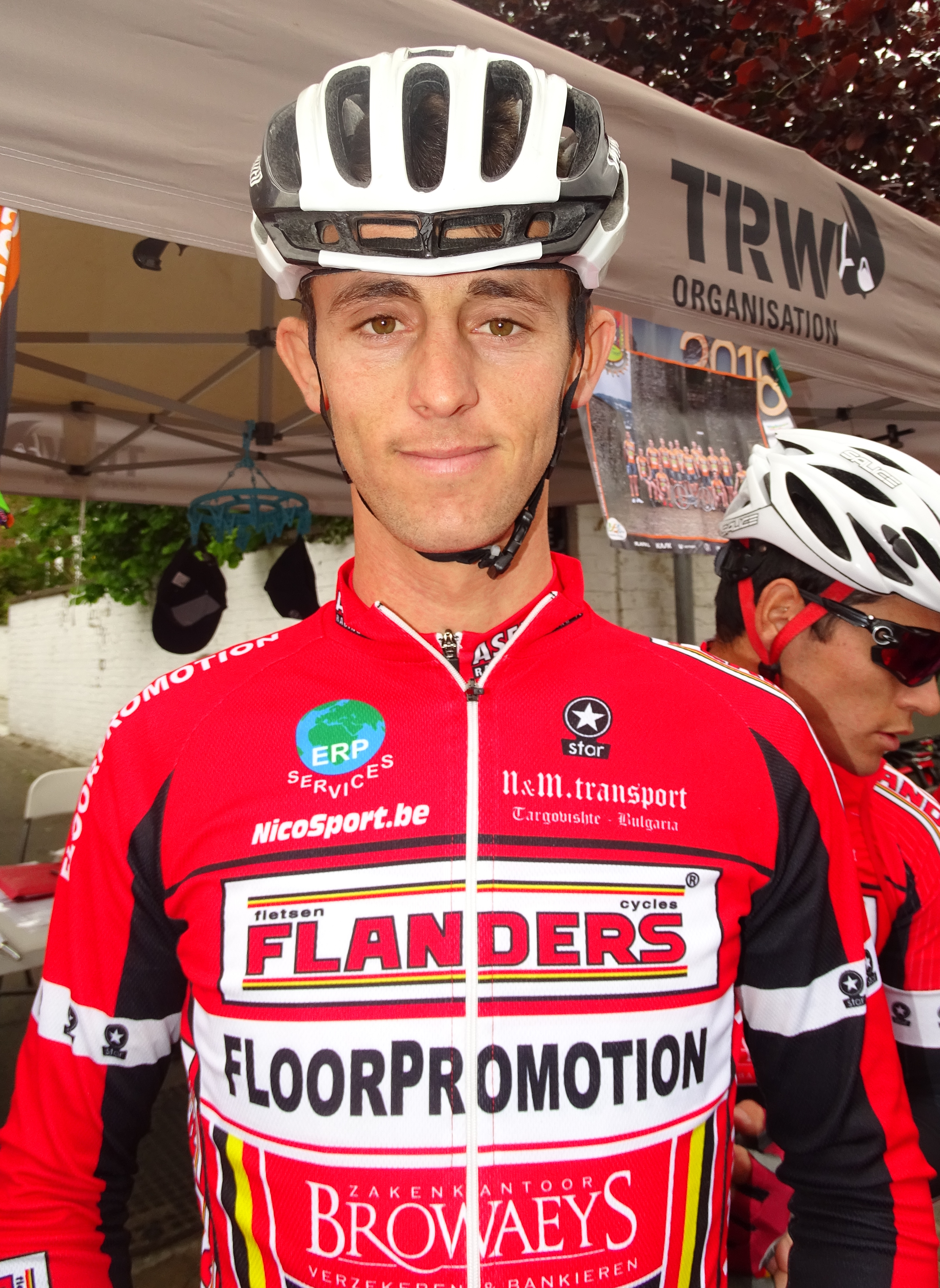
- Sefa in 2016

Personal information
- Full name: Ylber Sefa
- Born: 15 February 1991 (age 35) Tirana, Albania
- Height: 1.9 m (6 ft 3 in)
- Weight: 72 kg (159 lb)

Cycling career
- Sport: Cycling
- Current team: Tarteletto–Isorex
- Discipline: Road
- Role: Rider

Amateur team
- 2015–2017: Asfra Racing Oudenaarde

Professional team
- 2018–: Tarteletto–Isorex

Ylber Sefa (born 15 February 1991) is an Albanian cyclist, who currently rides for UCI Continental team Tarteletto–Isorex.

== Major results ==
2010
1st Stage 1 Tour of Albania
2nd Road race, National Road Championships
2011
1st Overall Tour of Kosovo

1st Stage 1

2nd Time trial, National Road Championships
3rd Overall Tour of Albania

1st Prologue & Stage 3

2012
National Road Championships

2nd Road race
2nd Time trial

3rd Overall Tour of Albania
2015
2nd Overall Tour of Kosovo

1st Stage 4

3rd Overall Tour of Albania

1st Stage 1

2016
1st Overall Tour of Albania

1st Prologue & Stages 1, 2, 4 & 5

1st Overall Tour of Kosovo

1st Stage 1

2nd Time trial, National Road Championships
5th Balkan Elite Road Classics
2017
1st Road race, National Road Championships
1st Omloop van de Grensstreek
2018
1st Road race, National Road Championships
9th Overall Tour of Iran (Azerbaijan)
2019
1st Road race, Balkan Road Championships
National Road Championships

1st Road race
1st Time trial

2nd GP Briek Schotte
10th Overall Tour of Albania

1st Stage 1

2020
National Road Championships

1st Road race
1st Time trial

2021
National Road Championships

1st Road race
1st Time trial

2022
1st Overall Tour of Albania

1st Stages 1 & 5

National Road Championships

1st Road race
1st Time trial

2023
National Road Championships

1st Time trial
