= Jūrmala Grand Prix =

Cycling race in Latvia

Jurmala Grand Prix
Race details
- Date: June
- Region: Jurmala, Latvia
- Discipline: Road
- Competition: UCI Europe Tour
- Type: One-day race
- Web site: www.maratoni.lv/en/jurmala-grand-prix

History
- First edition: 2011
- Editions: 3
- Final edition: 2013
- First winner: Jaan Kirsipuu (EST)
- Most wins: No repeat winners
- Final winner: Francesco Chicchi (ITA)

The Jūrmala Grand Prix was a one-day cycling race held in Jūrmala, Latvia. It was part of the UCI Europe Tour in category 1.1.

== Winners ==
Year	Country	Rider	Team
2011	Estonia	Jaan Kirsipuu	Champion System
2012	Brazil	Rafael Andriato	Farnese Vini–Selle Italia
2013	Italy	Francesco Chicchi	Vini Fantini–Selle Italia
