= Roberto De Patre =

Italian cyclist

Personal information
- Born: 13 September 1988 (age 38) Atri, Abruzzo, Italy

Cycling career
- Sport: Cycling
- Current team: Retired
- Discipline: Road
- Role: Rider

Amateur teams
- 2007–2009: Aran World–Cantina Tollo–BLS
- 2009: Acqua & Sapone–Caffè Mokambo (stagiaire)

Professional teams
- 2010: Acqua & Sapone
- 2011–2014: Farnese Vini–Neri Sottoli

Roberto De Patre (born 13 September 1988) is an Italian former professional racing cyclist, who rode professionally for Acqua & Sapone and Wilier Triestina–Southeast between 2010 and 2014.
