= Albanian National Road Race Championships =

National road cycling championship in Albania

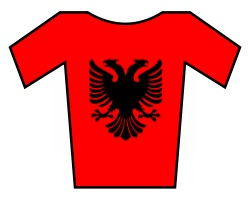
The champion's jersey

The Albanian National Road Race Championships have been held since 1998.

== Multiple winners ==
Men

Wins	Name	Years
6	Ylber Sefa	2017, 2018, 2019, 2020, 2021, 2022
4	Eugert Zhupa	2009, 2011, 2012, 2016
3	Besnik Musaj	1998, 1999, 2002
3	Vern Hanaray	2010, 2013, 2015

== Men ==
Albanian National Road Race Championships – Men's elite race
Race details
- Region: Albania
- Discipline: Road bicycle racing
- Type: One-day

History
- First edition: 1998
- First winner: Besnik Musaj
- Most wins: Ylber Sefa (6 wins)
- Most recent: Olsian Velia

Year	Gold	Silver	Bronze
1998	Besnik Musaj	Gezim Miloja	Altin Buzi
1999	Besnik Musaj	Agron Bogan	Alexander Lazri
2002	Besnik Musaj	Vangjel Kule	Palion Zarka
2007	Palion Zarka	Erjon Buzi	Jonid Tosku
2008	Shpat Karai	Besmir Banushi	Erjon Buzi
2009	Eugert Zhupa	Redi Halilaj	Ervin Haxhi
2010	Redi Halilaj	Ylber Sefa	Besmir Banushi
2011	Eugert Zhupa	Besmir Banushi	Erjon Buzi
2012	Eugert Zhupa	Ylber Sefa	Besmir Banushi
2013	Redi Halilaj	Yrmet Kastrati	Olsjan Velia
2014	Xhuliano Kamberaj	Iltjan Nika	Klinti Grembi
2015	Redi Halilaj	Eugert Zhupa	Besmir Banushi
2016	Eugert Zhupa	Iltjan Nika	Redi Halilaj
2017	Ylber Sefa	Redi Halilaj	Besmir Banushi
2018	Ylber Sefa	Eugert Zhupa	Velia Olsian
2019	Ylber Sefa	Velia Olsian	Drini Bardhi
2020	Ylber Sefa	Velia Olsian	Besmir Banushi
2021	Ylber Sefa	Kristel Sota	Drini Bardhi
2022	Ylber Sefa	Mikel Demiri	Brikel Barci
2023	Lukas Kloppenborg	Olsian Velia	Ylber Sefa
2024	Olsian Velia	Flavio Venomi	Mateo Balaj

=== U23 ===
Year	Gold	Silver	Bronze
2015	Iltjan Nika	Marildo Yzeiraj	Krisel Sota
2017	Iltjan Nika	Krisel Sota	Devis Hasa
2019	Klidi Jaku	Bruno Kola	Marcelo Kola
2020	Gjergj Zefi	Ilia Cota	Marcelo Kola
2021	Mikel Demiri	Bruno Kola	Jorgo Gjata
2022	Mikel Demiri	Brikel Barci	Nuri Mullalli

== See also ==
- Albanian National Time Trial Championships
- National road cycling championships
