= Giorgio Cecchinel =

Italian cyclist

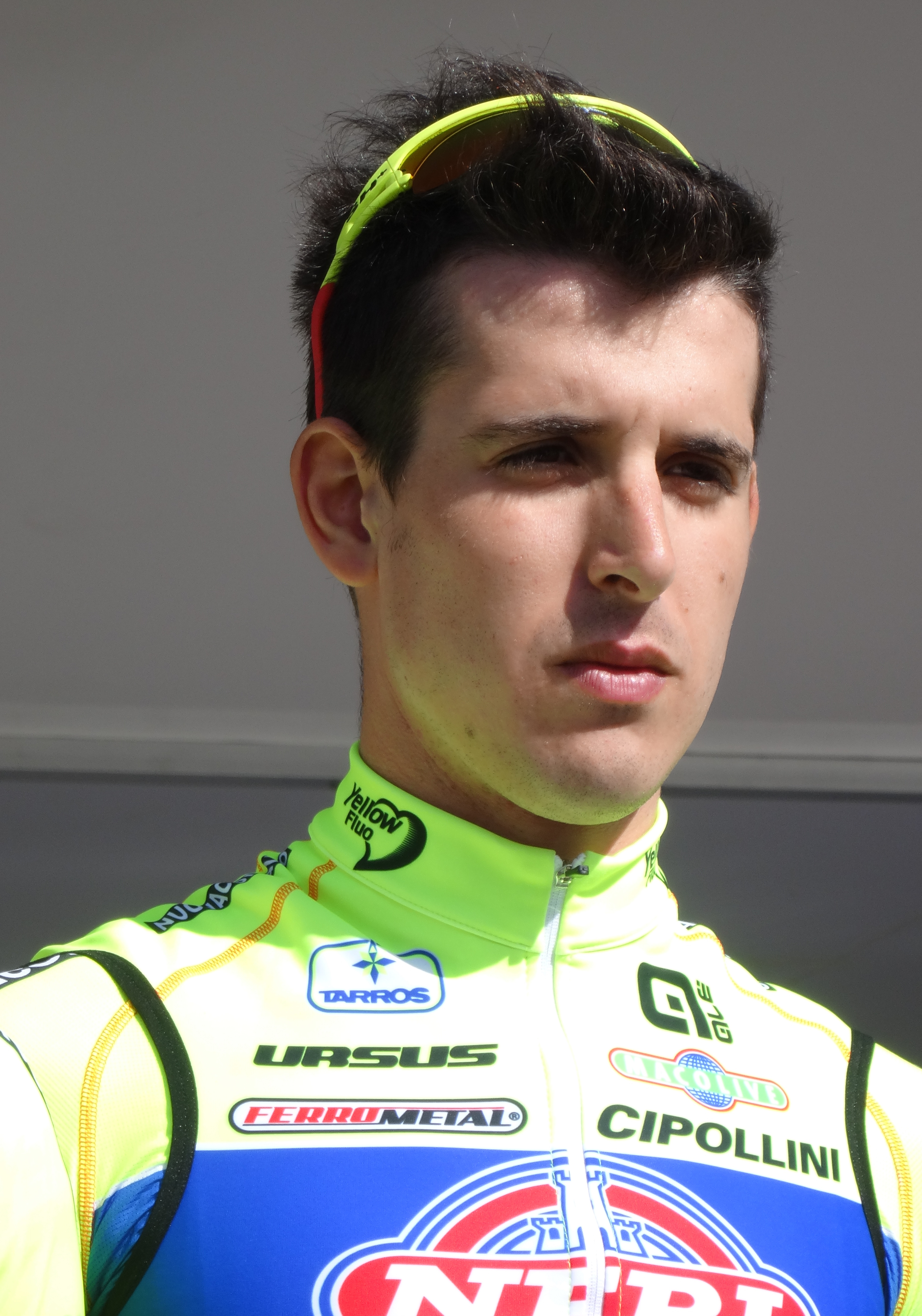
- Cecchinel in 2014

Personal information
- Full name: Giorgio Cecchinel
- Born: 24 June 1989 (age 37) Veneto, Italy

Cycling career
- Sport: Cycling
- Current team: Retired
- Discipline: Road
- Role: Rider

Amateur teams
- 2008–2010: Zalf–Désirée–Fior
- 2011: Mastromarco–Chianti Sensi–Benedetti
- 2012: Zalf–Euromobil
- 2013: Gallina Eurofeed

Professional teams
- 2014–2015: Yellow Fluo
- 2016: Androni Giocattoli–Sidermec

Giorgio Cecchinel (born 24 June 1989) is an Italian former professional racing cyclist. He raced in the 2014 Giro d'Italia, but did not start stage 6 due to illness.
