= Krofdorf-Gleiberg =

Coordinates: 50°37′22″N 8°38′03″E

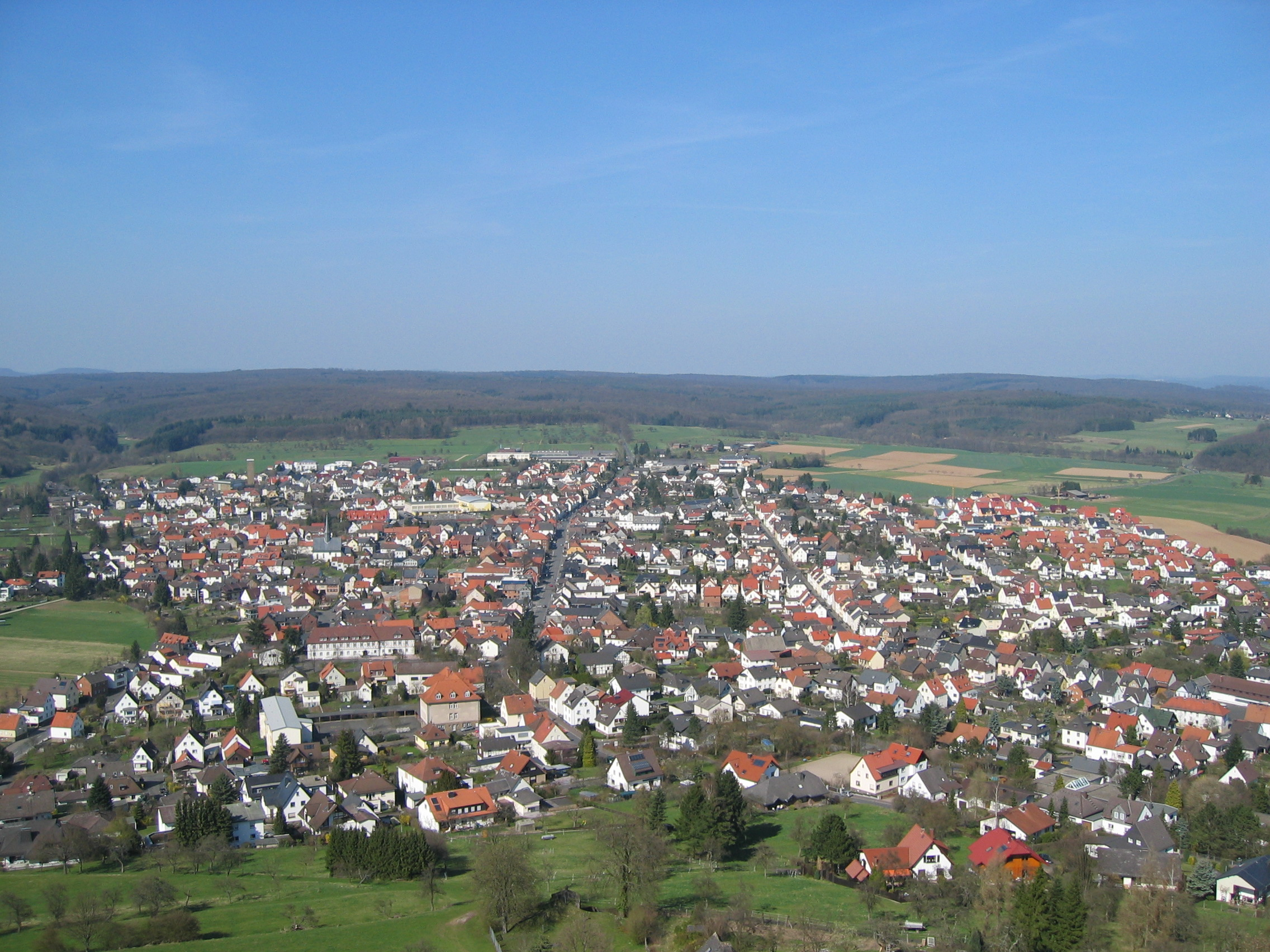
Krofdorf viewed from the Gleiberg tower

Krofdorf-Gleiberg is a settlement in the Wettenberg municipality in Hesse, Germany.
