= Eugert Zhupa =

Albanian cyclist (born 1990)

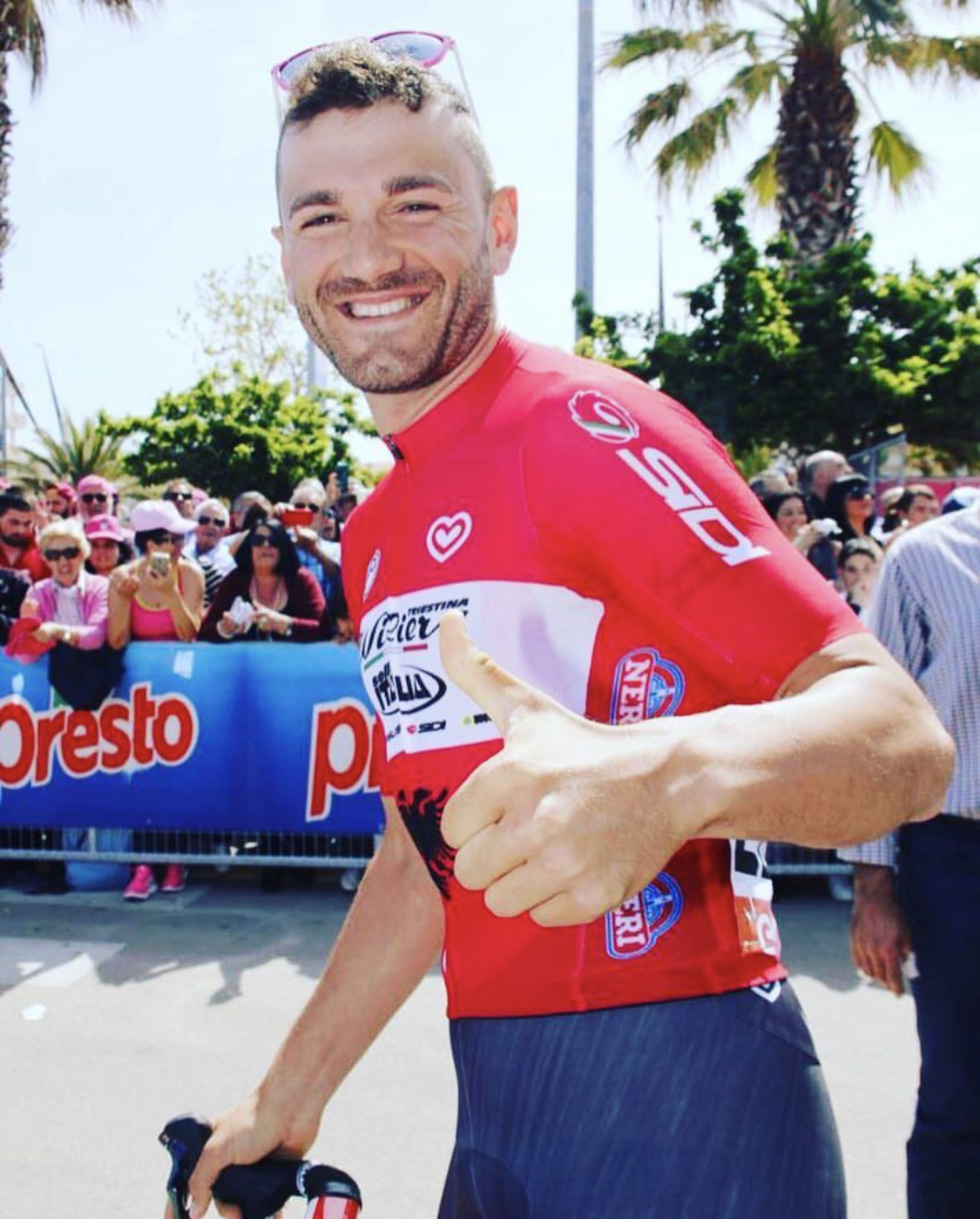
- Zhupa at the 2017 Giro d'Italia

Personal information
- Born: 4 April 1990 (age 36) Rrogozhinë, Albania
- Height: 183 cm (6 ft 0 in)
- Weight: 78 kg (172 lb)

Cycling career
- Sport: Cycling
- Discipline: Road
- Role: Rider

Amateur teams
- 2009: Bottoli Nordelettrica Ramonda
- 2010–2013: U.C. Trevigiani–Dynamon–Bottoli
- 2014: Zalf–Euromobil–Désirée–Fior

Professional teams
- 2013: Christina Watches–Onfone
- 2015–2018: Southeast Pro Cycling
- 2019: EvoPro Racing

Major wins
- One-day races and Classics National Road Race Championships (2009, 2011, 2012, 2016) National Time Trial Championships (2015, 2016, 2018)

Eugert Zhupa (born 4 April 1990 in Rrogozhinë) is an Albanian former professional cyclist, who rode professionally between 2013 and 2019. He won the Albanian National Road Race Championships four times.

During the 2018 racing season he had the most race days between all professional riders with 99 days.

== Major results ==
2009
1st Road race, National Road Championships
2011
1st Road race, National Road Championships
9th Paris–Roubaix Espoirs
2012
1st Road race, National Road Championships
2013
1st Overall Tour of Albania
2015
National Road Championships

1st Time trial
2nd Road race

2016
National Road Championships

1st Road race
1st Time trial

1st Balkan Elite Road Classics
2018
National Road Championships

1st Time trial
2nd Road race

2019
1st Stage 5 Tour of Albania

=== Grand Tour general classification results timeline ===
Grand Tour	2015	2016	2017	2018
Giro d'Italia	157	130	140	148
Tour de France	—	—	—	—
Vuelta a España	—	—	—	—

Legend
—	Did not compete
DNF	Did not finish
