= Albanian National Time Trial Championships =

National road cycling championship in Albania

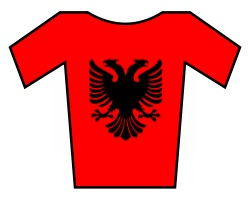
The champion's jersey

The Albanian National Time Trial Championships have been held since 2002.

== Multiple winners ==
Men

Wins	Name	Years
6	Eugert Zhupa	2009, 2011, 2012, 2015, 2016, 2018
5	Ylber Sefa	2019, 2020, 2021, 2022, 2023
3	Palion Zarka	2002, 2007, 2008
2	Iltjan Nika	2014, 2017

== Men ==
Albanian National Time Trial Championships
Race details
- Region: Albania
- Discipline: Road bicycle racing
- Type: One-day

History
- First edition: 2002
- First winner: Palion Zarka
- Most wins: Eugert Zhupa (6 wins)
- Most recent: Olsian Velia

Year	Gold	Silver	Bronze
2002	Palion Zarka	Besnik Musaj	Admir Hasimaj
2003– 2006	Not held		
2007	Palion Zarka	Erjon Plaka	Besmir Banushi
2008	Palion Zarka	Ervin Haxhi	Leonard Zeneli
2009	Eugert Zhupa	Ervin Haxhi	Palion Zarka
2010	Not held		
2011	Eugert Zhupa	Ylber Sefa	Sufa Autin
2012	Eugert Zhupa	Ylber Sefa	Donald Mukaj
2013	Redi Halilaj	Olsjan Velia	Marius Huqi
2014	Iltjan Nika	Xhuliano Kamberaj	Marildo Yzeiraj
2015	Eugert Zhupa	Besmir Banushi	Laert Bregu
2016	Eugert Zhupa	Ylber Sefa	Laert Bregu
2017	Iltjan Nika	Besmir Banushi	Olsian Velia
2018	Eugert Zhupa	Olsian Velia	Besmir Banushi
2019	Ylber Sefa	Olsian Velia	Drini Bardhi
2020	Ylber Sefa	Olsian Velia	Besmir Banushi
2021	Ylber Sefa	Olsian Velia	Drini Bardhi
2022	Ylber Sefa	Brikel Barci	Mikel Demiri
2023	Ylber Sefa	Olsian Velia	Lukas Kloppenborg
2024	Olsian Velia	Mateo Balaj	Flavio Venomi

=== U23 ===
Year	Gold	Silver	Bronze
2015	Iltjan Nika	Marildo Yzeiraj	Krisel Sota
2017	Iltjan Nika	Bujar Muca	Irindi Dova
2019	Klidi Jaku	Bruno Kola	Marcelo Kola
2020	Ilia Cota	Bruno Kola	Gjergj Zefi
2021	Mikel Demiri	Gjergj Zefi	Bruno Kola
2022	Brikel Barci	Mikel Demiri	Nuri Mullalli

== See also ==
- Albanian National Road Race Championships
- National road cycling championships
