= Besnik Musaj =

Albanian cyclist (born 1973)

Personal information
- Born: 29 December 1973 (age 52)

Cycling career
- Sport: Cycling
- Current team: Retired
- Discipline: Road
- Role: Rider

Besnik Musaj (born 29 December 1973) is an Albanian former cyclist who represented his country in the 1996 Summer Olympics. He competed in the men's road race, but he failed to finish the race. He won the Tour of Albania for seven consecutive years from 1995 to 2001, and the Albanian National Road Race Championships in 1998, 1999 and 2002.
