= Besmir Banushi =

Albanian bicycle racer (born 1988)

Personal information
- Born: 24 July 1988 (age 38) Vlorë, Albania

Cycling career
- Sport: Cycling
- Discipline: Road
- Role: Rider

Amateur team
- 2011: SC Cene-Valle Seriana

Professional team
- 2017–2018: Amore & Vita–Selle SMP

Besmir Banushi (born 24 July 1988) is an Albanian cyclist, who last rode for UCI Continental team Amore & Vita–Prodir.

== Major results ==
2006
1st Trofej Sajamskih Gradova
2nd Overall Tour of Albania
3rd Road race, Balkan Junior Road Championships
2007
2nd Overall Tour of Albania

1st Stage 1

2008
1st Road race, Balkan Road Championships
National Road Championships

2nd Road race
3rd Time trial

2nd Overall Tour of Albania
4th Overall Tour of Szeklerland
5th Plovdiv Cup
6th Overall Romanian Cycling Tour
2009
2nd Overall Tour of Albania
2010
1st Overall Tour of Albania

1st Stage 5

3rd Road race, National Road Championships
3rd Overall Tour of Kosovo
5th Overall Tour of Trakya
2011
1st Overall Tour of Albania

1st Stages 1 & 4

2nd Road race, National Road Championships
2012
1st Overall Tour of Albania

1st Stage 3

1st Overall Tour of Kosovo

1st Stages 3 & 4

3rd Road race, National Road Championships
2015
National Road Championships

2nd Time trial
3rd Road race

3rd Overall Tour of Kosovo
3rd Overall Tour of Albania

1st Prologue

2016
2nd Overall Tour of Albania

1st Stage 2

2017
National Road Championships

2nd Time trial
3rd Road race

2nd Overall Tour of Kosovo

1st Stage 4

2018
3rd Time trial, National Road Championships
2019
4th Time trial, National Road Championships
2020
National Road Championships

3rd Road race
3rd Time trial
