= Altin Sufa =

Albanian cyclist (born 1988)

Personal information
- Born: July 20, 1988 (age 38) Kavajë, Albania

Cycling career
- Sport: Cycling
- Current team: Amore & Vita
- Discipline: Road
- Role: Rider

Amateur team
- Albania national team

Professional team
- 2017–2018: Amore & Vita–Selle SMP

Altin Sufa (born 20 July 1988, in Kavajë) is an Albanian cyclist who last rode for Amore & Vita–Prodir. Considered one of the top cyclists in the country, he has been a member of the Albania national cycling team since 2008.
