= Andrea Dal Col =

Italian cyclist

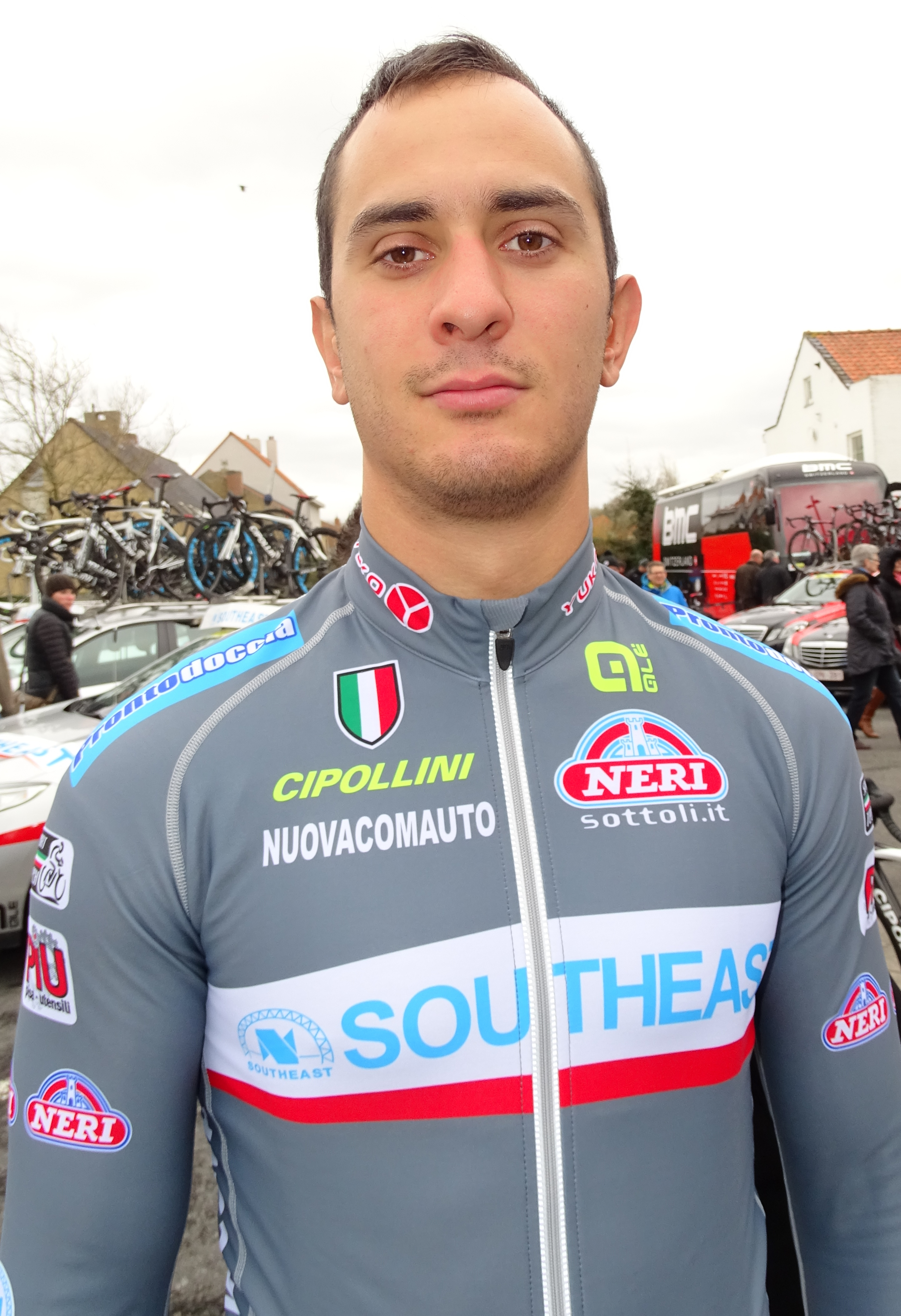
- Andrea Dal Col in 2015

Personal information
- Born: 30 April 1991 (age 35) Conegliano, Italy

Cycling career
- Sport: Cycling
- Current team: Retired
- Discipline: Road
- Role: Rider

Amateur team
- 2010–2013: U.C. Trevigiani–Dynamon–Bottoli

Professional team
- 2014–2016: Yellow Fluo

Andrea Dal Col (born 30 April 1991) is an Italian former professional racing cyclist, who rode professionally for Wilier Triestina–Southeast between 2014 and 2016.

== Major results ==
2012
1st Stage 2b (ITT) Giro Ciclistico d'Italia
2014
1st Stage 6 (ITT) Vuelta al Táchira
2015
1st Stage 5 Tour do Rio
