= Rafael Andriato =

Brazilian road racing cyclist

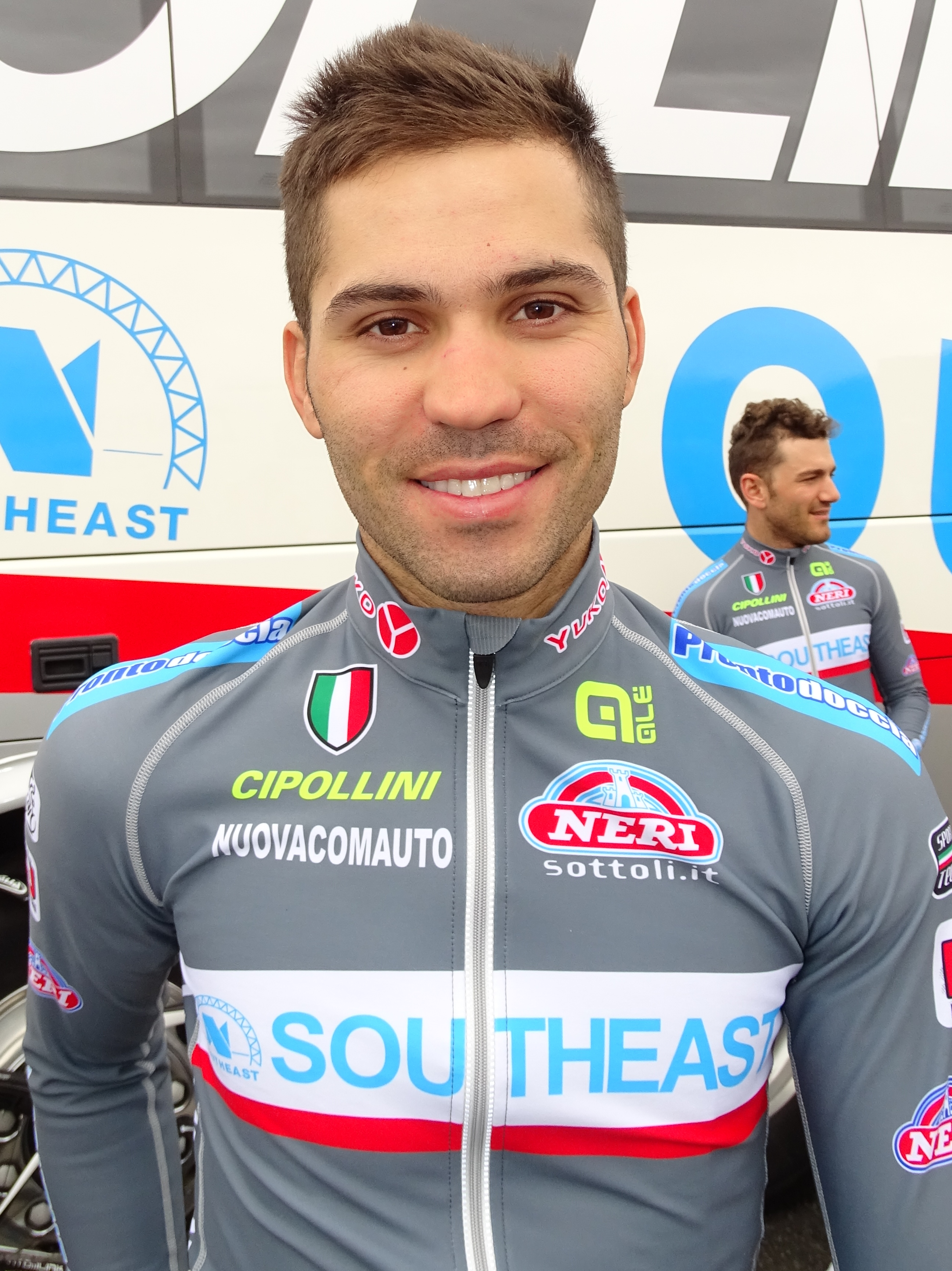
- Andriato in 2015

Personal information
- Full name: Rafael de Mattos Andriato
- Born: 20 October 1987 (age 38) São Paulo, Brazil
- Height: 1.77 m (5 ft 10 in)
- Weight: 69 kg (152 lb; 10.9 st)

Cycling career
- Sport: Cycling
- Current team: Retired
- Discipline: Road
- Role: Rider
- Rider type: Sprinter

Amateur teams
- 2007: Memorial–Fupes–Santos
- 2008–2010: U.C. Trevigiani
- 2011: Petroli–Firenze
- 2016: Memorial–Santos/Fupes
- 2018: São Francisco Saúde–Klabin–SME Ribeirão Preto

Professional teams
- 2012–2015: Farnese Vini–Selle Italia
- 2016–2017: Wilier Triestina–Southeast
- 2019–2020: São Francisco Saúde–Klabin–SME Ribeirão Preto
- 2022: Swift Carbon Pro Cycling Brasil

Major wins
- Châteauroux Classic (2012)

Rafael de Mattos Andriato (born 20 October 1987) is a Brazilian former professional road bicycle racer, who competed as a professional between 2012 and 2022.

Born in São Paulo, Andriato has competed as a professional since the start of the 2012 season, joining the Farnese Vini–Selle Italia team from the Petroli-Firenze squad. In May 2012, Andriato took his first victory for the team, by winning the Jurmala GP in Latvia. He only competed in one Grand Tour in his entire career, the 2013 Giro d'Italia, but in that race he won the intermediate sprints competition as well as the Premio della Fuga, which was a competition for the most active breakaway riders.

== Major results ==
2006
2nd Tour de Mato Grosso
2nd Prova Ciclística 9 de Julho
2007
1st Prova Ciclística 9 de Julho
1st Meeting Internacional de Goiania
1st Stage 1 Volta do Rio de Janeiro
Volta de Ciclismo Internacional do Estado de São Paulo

1st Points classification
1st Stages 4 & 10

1st Stage 1 Volta do Paraná
7th Copa America de Ciclismo
2008
1st G.P. di Roncoleva
1st Memorial Benfenati
1st Memorial Fratelli Gandolfi
3rd GP San Luigi
3rd M.O. Città di Villanova
3rd Circuito dell'Assunta
4th Trofeo Avis Aido
4th Trofeo Pama Prefabbricati
4th Memorial Vincenzo Mantovani
4th Gran Premio Rinascita
5th Gran Premio San Gottardo
2009
1st Giro del Veneto
1st Memorial Fratelli Gandolfi
2nd Giro dei Tre Ponti
2nd Trofeo Papà Cervi
3rd Circuito Notturno Città di San Donà
3rd G.P. Site Marchiol Pasta Montegrappa
3rd Coppa Comune di Piubega
4th GP San Bernardino
4th GP Città di Valeggio
4th Memorial Carlo Valentini
4th Piccola Agostoni
5th Medaglia d'Oro Fiera di Sommacampagna
5th Circuito dell'Assunta
5th Circuito Silvanese
5th M.O. O. Bottecchia-Notturna
5th Coppa Città di Lonigo
6th Coppa Città di San Daniele
6th Trofeo Avis
6th Gran Premio San Luigi
6th Trofeo Alcide Degasperi
6th Coppa Caduti Buscatesi
6th Trofeo Città di San Vendemiano
7th Memorial Vittime del Vajont 9 Ottobre 1963
7th Coppa Città di Este
7th Gran Premio di Roncoleva
7th La Popolarissima
8th Gran Premio Città di Verona
2010
1st GP Ezio del Rosso
1st Medaglia d'Oro Frare De Nardi
2nd Astico–Brenta
2nd Medaglia d'Oro Fiera di Sommacampagna
2nd Coppa Ballerini
2nd Gran Premio Industrie del Marmo
2nd Circuito del Porto
2nd Memorial Gerry Gasparotto
2nd Piccola Sanremo
3rd Coppa Collecchio
3rd GP Bianco di Custoza
3rd G.P. Ind. Comm. Art. Comune di Botticino
3rd Trofeo Rosalpina
3rd GP Montanino
4th Trofeo Gianfranco Bianchin
4th Giro del Veneto
4th GP Città di Felino
4th Memorial Angelo Ripamonti
5th Coppa San Geo
6th GP Colli Rovescalesi
7th GP Cementizillo
7th La Popolarissima
7th Trofeo Franco Balestra
9th Coppa Placci
2011
1st Gran Premio Industrie del Marmo
1st Trofeo Petroli Firenze
1st Trofeo Città di Lastra a Signa
1st Coppa Festa in Fiera San Salvatore
1st Stage 2 Volta do Rio de Janeiro
2nd Gran Premio Industria Commercio Artigianato
2nd Coppa Ciuffenna
3rd Trofeo Corsanico
3rd Trofeo Matteotti
3rd Parma–La Spezia
3rd Coppa Comune di Castiglion Fiorentino
4th GP Città di Vinci
5th Trofeo Nesti e Nelli Concessionaria Toyota
7th Trofeo Adolfo Leoni
9th GP Sportivi Chiassa Superiore
2012
1st Jūrmala GP
1st Châteauroux Classic
2nd Road race, National Road Championships
8th Grand Prix Impanis-Van Petegem
10th Paris–Brussels
2013
1st Stage 2 Tour do Rio
Giro d'Italia

1st Premio della Fuga
1st Traguardo Volante classification

2nd Jūrmala GP
9th Gran Premio Industria e Commercio di Prato
10th Gran Premio Bruno Beghelli
2014
Tour do Rio

1st Stages 2, 5 & 6

1st Stage 8 Vuelta a Venezuela
4th Memorial Marco Pantani
4th Gran Premio Bruno Beghelli
7th Gran Premio della Costa Etruschi
9th Gran Premio Nobili Rubinetterie
9th Grand Prix de Fourmies
2015
1st Prologue Sibiu Cycling Tour
2016
1st Stage 1 Tour of Hainan
2018
1st Stage 6 Vuelta del Uruguay
8th Road race, Pan American Road Championships
2019
5th Road race, National Road Championships
2021
8th Road race, Pan American Road Championships

=== Grand Tour general classification results timeline ===
Grand Tour	2013
Giro d'Italia	165
Tour de France	—
Vuelta a España	—

Legend
—	Did not compete
DNF	Did not finish
