= Tour of Albania =

Multi-stage cycling race

Race details
- Date: 18–22 May
- Region: Albania
- Local name: Turi Çiklistik i Shqipërisë
- Discipline: Road
- Competition: UCI Europe Tour
- Type: stage race
- Organiser: Albanian Cycling Federation
- Web site: albcycling.al

History
- First edition: 25 August 1925; 100 years ago
- Editions: 83 (as of 2026)
- First winner: Jonuz Gjylbegu (ALB)
- Most wins: Bilal Agalliu (ALB) (11 wins)
- Most recent: Niels Reemeijer (NED)

The Tour of Albania (Albanian: Turi Çiklistik i Shqipërisë) is an annual multi-stage road cycling race held in Albania. Established in 1925, it is one of the oldest sporting competitions in the country and is organized by the Albanian Cycling Federation. Since 2017, the race has been part of the UCI Europe Tour calendar as a category 2.2 event.

The race is contested over several stages across different regions and attracts both local and international professional and amateur cycling teams.

== History ==
The first edition of the Tour of Albania was organized on August 25, 1925 and covered a distance of 1,300 kilometers. On the inaugural race, local municipalities and prefectures along the route hosted a ceremonial welcome, providing the cyclists with lodging, meals and medical assistance. It became customary for the top three cyclists in each stage to receive special gifts in recognition of their performance.

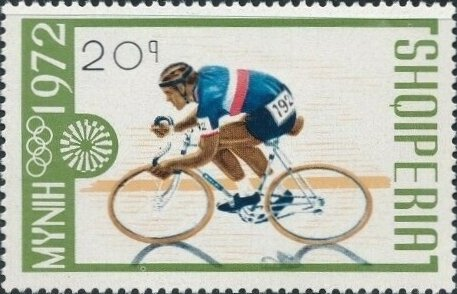
Albanian stamp commemorating the sport of cycling at the 1972 Olympic games in Munich, West Germany.

The competition was interrupted in several ocassions during periods of political unrest and throughout World War II. The race would resume in 1946 and soon became an annual event organized by Albania’s cycling authorities. During communist rule, it grew into one of the country’s leading sporting competitions, bringing together teams representing cities, sports clubs and state institutions.

In 2017, the Tour of Albania was officially included in the UCI Europe Tour calendar, raising its international profile and attracting professional teams from several countries.

The 2020 edition of the race was cancelled as a result of the COVID-19 pandemic.

== Format ==
The tour is held as a road stage race contested over multiple days. Stages are typically organized through mountainous terrain, coastal roads and urban circuits throughout Albania. The overall winner is determined by the lowest cumulative time across all stages.

The race is organized by the Albanian Cycling Federation and sanctioned by the Union Cycliste Internationale (UCI) as part of the Europe Tour.

== Winners ==
| Wins | Rider | Editions |
|---|---|---|
| 11 | (Albania) Bilal Agalliu (ALB) | 1954, 1955, 1956, 1957, 1958, 1959, 1960, 1961, 1962, 1963, 1965 |
| 7 | (Albania) Besnik Musaj (ALB) | 1995, 1996, 1997, 1998, 1999, 2000, 2001 |
| 6 | (Albania) Agim Tafili (ALB) | 1979, 1980, 1981, 1982, 1984, 1985 |
| 5 | (Albania) Palion Zarka (ALB) | 2003, 2004, 2005, 2006, 2007 |
| 4 | (Albania) Fadil Muriqi (ALB) | 1950, 1951, 1952, 1953 |
| 3 | (Albania) Agron Tafilica (ALB) | 1973, 1974, 1975 |
| 3 | (Albania) Besmir Banushi (ALB) | 2010, 2011, 2012 |
| 2 | (Albania) Pirro Angjeli (ALB) | 1946, 1949 |
| 2 | (Albania) Mishel Cico (ALB) | 1948, 1948 |
| 2 | (Albania) Sali Hima (ALB) | 1967, 1968 |
| 2 | (Albania) Muharrem Ahmeti (ALB) | 1970, 1972 |
| 2 | (Albania) Lutfi Zino (ALB) | 1971, 1977 |
| 2 | (Albania) Agron Huqi (ALB) | 1978, 1987 |
| 2 | (Albania) Selim Çelmeta (ALB) | 1989, 1990 |
| 2 | (Albania) Agim Paja (ALB) | 1991, 1994 |
| 2 | (Albania) Jonid Toska (ALB) | 2008, 2009 |
| 2 | (Serbia) Marko Stanković (SRB) | 2014, 2015 |
| 2 | (Albania) Ylber Sefa (ALB) | 2016, 2022 |
| 1 | (Albania) Jonuz Gjylbegu (ALB) | 1925 |
| 1 | (Albania) Koço Kereku (ALB) | 1936 |
| 1 | (Albania) Gani Lacej (ALB) | 1947 |
| 1 | (Albania) Ruzhdi Muriqi (ALB) | 1964 |
| 1 | (Albania) Shefqet Dervishi (ALB) | 1966 |
| 1 | (Albania) Dashamir Rama (ALB) | 1969 |
| 1 | (Albania) Kastriot Mezini (ALB) | 1976 |
| 1 | (Albania) Albert Çuko (ALB) | 1983 |
| 1 | (Albania) Ardian Ferraizi (ALB) | 1986 |
| 1 | (Albania) Sytki Tafili (ALB) | 1988 |
| 1 | (Albania) Agron Boga (ALB) | 1993 |
| 1 | (Albania) Admir Hasimaj (ALB) | 2002 |
| 1 | (Albania) Eugert Zhupa (ALB) | 2013 |
| 1 | (Italy) Francesco Bongiorno (ITA) | 2017 |
| 1 | (Italy) Michele Gazzara (ITA) | 2018 |
| 1 | (Italy) Filippo Fiorelli (ITA) | 2019 |
| 1 | (Serbia) Dušan Veselinović (SRB) | 2021 |
| 1 | (United Kingdom) Max Stedman (GBR) | 2023 |
| 1 | (Serbia) Veljko Stojnić (SRB) | 2024 |
| 1 | (Netherlands) Tom Jonkmans (NED) | 2025 |
| 1 | (Netherlands) Niels Reemeijer (NED) | 2026 |

== See also ==
- Albanian Cycling Federation
- UCI Europe Tour
