= Balkan Elite Road Classics =

Race details
- Date: July
- Region: Albania
- Discipline: Road
- Competition: UCI Europe Tour
- Type: One-day race

History
- First edition: 2016
- Editions: 1
- Final edition: 2016
- First winner: Eugert Zhupa (ALB)
- Most wins: No repeat winners
- Final winner: Eugert Zhupa (ALB)

Balkan Elite Road Classics was a one-day road cycling race held only in 2016 in Albania. It was rated as a category 1.2 event on the UCI Europe Tour.

== Winners ==
Year	Country	Rider	Team
2016	Albania	Eugert Zhupa	Albania (national team)
