= Cycling at the 2019 European Games – Men's road race =

Men's road race at the 2019 European Games
- Venue: Minsk (180 km)
- Date: 23 June
- Competitors: 134 from 37 nations
- Winning time: 4h 10' 04"

Medalists
gold medal	Davide Ballerini	Italy
silver medal	Alo Jakin	Estonia
bronze medal	Daniel Auer	Austria

The men's road race cycling event at the 2019 European Games in Minsk took place on 23 June.

== Results ==
Rank	Rider	Nation	Time
1st place, gold medalist(s)	Davide Ballerini	Italy	4h 10' 04"
2nd place, silver medalist(s)	Alo Jakin	Estonia	+ 16"
3rd place, bronze medalist(s)	Daniel Auer	Austria	s.t.
4	Alexandr Riabushenko	Belarus	s.t.
5	Vitaliy Buts	Ukraine	+ 25"
6	Joris Nieuwenhuis	Netherlands	+ 41"
7	Scott Thwaites	Great Britain	s.t.
8	Robin Froidevaux	Switzerland	s.t.
9	Jan Bárta	Czech Republic	s.t.
10	Nelson Oliveira	Portugal	+ 45"
11	Théry Schir	Switzerland	+ 48"
12	Niccolò Bonifazio	Italy	+ 54"
13	Martin Laas	Estonia	s.t.
14	Mihkel Räim	Estonia	s.t.
15	Vasil Kiryienka	Belarus	s.t.
16	Marc Sarreau	France	s.t.
17	František Sisr	Czech Republic	s.t.
18	Alexander Krieger	Germany	s.t.
19	August Jensen	Norway	s.t.
20	Bram Welten	Netherlands	s.t.
21	Daniel Mestre	Portugal	s.t.
22	Gabriel Cullaigh	Great Britain	s.t.
23	Itamar Einhorn	Israel	s.t.
24	Gediminas Bagdonas	Lithuania	s.t.
25	Roy Goldstein	Israel	s.t.
26	Georgios Bouglas	Greece	s.t.
27	Florian Gamper	Austria	s.t.
28	Ethan Vernon	Great Britain	s.t.
29	Charalampos Kastrantas	Greece	s.t.
30	Robert-Jon McCarthy	Ireland	s.t.
31	Cristian Raileanu	Moldova	s.t.
32	Marco Canola	Italy	s.t.
33	Polychronis Tzortzakis	Greece	s.t.
34	Dominik Neumann	Czech Republic	s.t.
35	Matúš Štoček	Slovakia	s.t.
36	Pit Leyder	Luxembourg	s.t.
37	Alexander Porsev	Russia	s.t.
38	Rafael Silva	Portugal	s.t.
39	János Pelikán	Hungary	s.t.
40	Eduard-Michael Grosu	Romania	s.t.
41	Colin Heiderscheid	Luxembourg	s.t.
42	Lukas Rüegg	Switzerland	s.t.
43	Andreas Miltiadis	Cyprus	s.t.
44	Mario Gamper	Austria	s.t.
45	Andriy Vasylyuk	Ukraine	s.t.
46	Andris Vosekalns	Latvia	s.t.
47	Ádám Kristóf Karl	Hungary	s.t.
48	Patrik Tybor	Slovakia	s.t.
49	Márton Dina	Hungary	s.t.
50	Mustafa Sayar	Turkey	s.t.
51	Nikolai Shumov	Belarus	s.t.
52	Yauhen Sobal	Belarus	s.t.
53	Michael O'Loughlin	Ireland	s.t.
54	Nico Selenati	Switzerland	s.t.
55	Branislau Samoilau	Belarus	s.t.
56	Nico Denz	Germany	s.t.
57	Marek Čanecký	Slovakia	s.t.
58	Luka Pibernik	Slovenia	s.t.
59	Aleksejs Saramotins	Latvia	s.t.
60	Dario Cataldo	Italy	s.t.
61	Jaka Primožič	Slovenia	s.t.
62	Artem Nych	Russia	s.t.
63	Samir Jabrayilov	Azerbaijan	s.t.
64	Žiga Jerman	Slovenia	s.t.
65	Mattia Cattaneo	Italy	s.t.
66	Jakub Otruba	Czech Republic	s.t.
67	Dennis van Winden	Netherlands	s.t.
68	Justas Beniušis	Lithuania	+ 1' 03"
69	Norman Vahtra	Estonia	s.t.
70	Damien Touzé	France	s.t.
71	César Martingil	Portugal	+ 1' 08"
72	Ylber Sefa	Albania	+ 1' 10"
73	Ryan Mullen	Ireland	+ 1' 13"
74	Christopher Hatz	Germany	+ 1' 37"
75	Dušan Rajović	Serbia	+ 1' 51"
76	Māris Bogdanovičs	Latvia	s.t.
77	Anton Vorobyev	Russia	+ 1' 56"
78	Onur Balkan	Turkey	+ 2' 04"
79	Jim Brown	Great Britain	+ 2' 23"
80	Ramūnas Navardauskas	Lithuania	+ 3' 08"
81	Mathieu Burgaudeau	France	+ 3' 11"
82	Nik Čemažar	Slovenia	+ 4' 14"
83	Juraj Bellan	Slovakia	s.t.
84	Kristers Ansons	Latvia	+ 5' 35"
85	Mykhaylo Kononenko	Ukraine	+ 6' 06"
86	Oleksandr Golovash	Ukraine	s.t.
87	Julius van den Berg	Netherlands	+ 6' 11"
88	Adomaitis Rojus	Lithuania	+ 6' 14"
89	Matthew Teggart	Ireland	s.t.
90	Viktor Potočki	Croatia	s.t.
91	Venantas Lašinis	Lithuania	+ 6' 32"
92	João Matias	Portugal	s.t.
93	Petr Hampl	Czech Republic	s.t.
94	Oleksandr Prevar	Ukraine	+ 6' 39"
95	Alexander Smyth	Malta	s.t.
96	Charley Calvert	Great Britain	s.t.
97	Corentin Ermenault	France	s.t.
98	Evgeny Shalunov	Russia	+ 6' 48"
99	Mark Downey	Ireland	+ 10' 47"
100	Antonio Barać	Croatia	s.t.
101	Paul Taebling	Germany	+ 11' 23"
102	Tiago Da Silva	Luxembourg	s.t.
103	Ján Andrej Cully	Slovakia	s.t.
104	Elchin Asadov	Azerbaijan	s.t.
105	Jan Petelin	Luxembourg	+ 11' 26"
106	Andrej Petrovski	North Macedonia	+ 12' 22"
107	Karl Patrick Lauk	Estonia	s.t.
108	Filip Kvasina	Croatia	+ 12' 23"
109	Stepan Kurianov	Russia	s.t.
110	Christian Koch	Germany	+ 13' 52"
111	Stevan Klisurić	Serbia	s.t.
112	Alexandros Matsangos	Cyprus	+ 16' 14"
113	Andrei Vrabii	Moldova	+ 17' 25"
114	Dániel Dina	Hungary	+ 17' 48"
115	Misch Leyder	Luxembourg	s.t.
116	Sondre Holst Enger	Norway	s.t.
	Donavan Grondin	France	DNF
	Tristan Marguet	Switzerland	DNF
	Marius Petrache	Romania	DNF
	Valentin Pleşea	Romania	DNF
	Halil İbrahim Doğan	Turkey	DNF
	Feritcan Şamlı	Turkey	DNF
	Musa Mikayilzade	Azerbaijan	DNF
	Mikayil Safarli	Azerbaijan	DNF
	Klidi Jaku	Albania	DNF
	Arman Garibian	Moldova	DNF
	Vladislav Corotas	Moldova	DNF
	Veaceslav Rusnac	Moldova	DNF
	Armanto Archimandritis	Cyprus	DNF
	Tengiz Barbakadze	Georgia	DNF
	Vedad Karić	Bosnia and Herzegovina	DNF
	Nedžad Mahmić	Bosnia and Herzegovina	DNF
	Victor Langellotti	Monaco	DNF
	Samuel Ponce	Andorra	DNF
	Serghei Țvetcov	Romania	DNS
