= Moldovan National Time Trial Championships =

National road cycling championship in Moldova

Moldovan National Time Trial Championships – Men's race
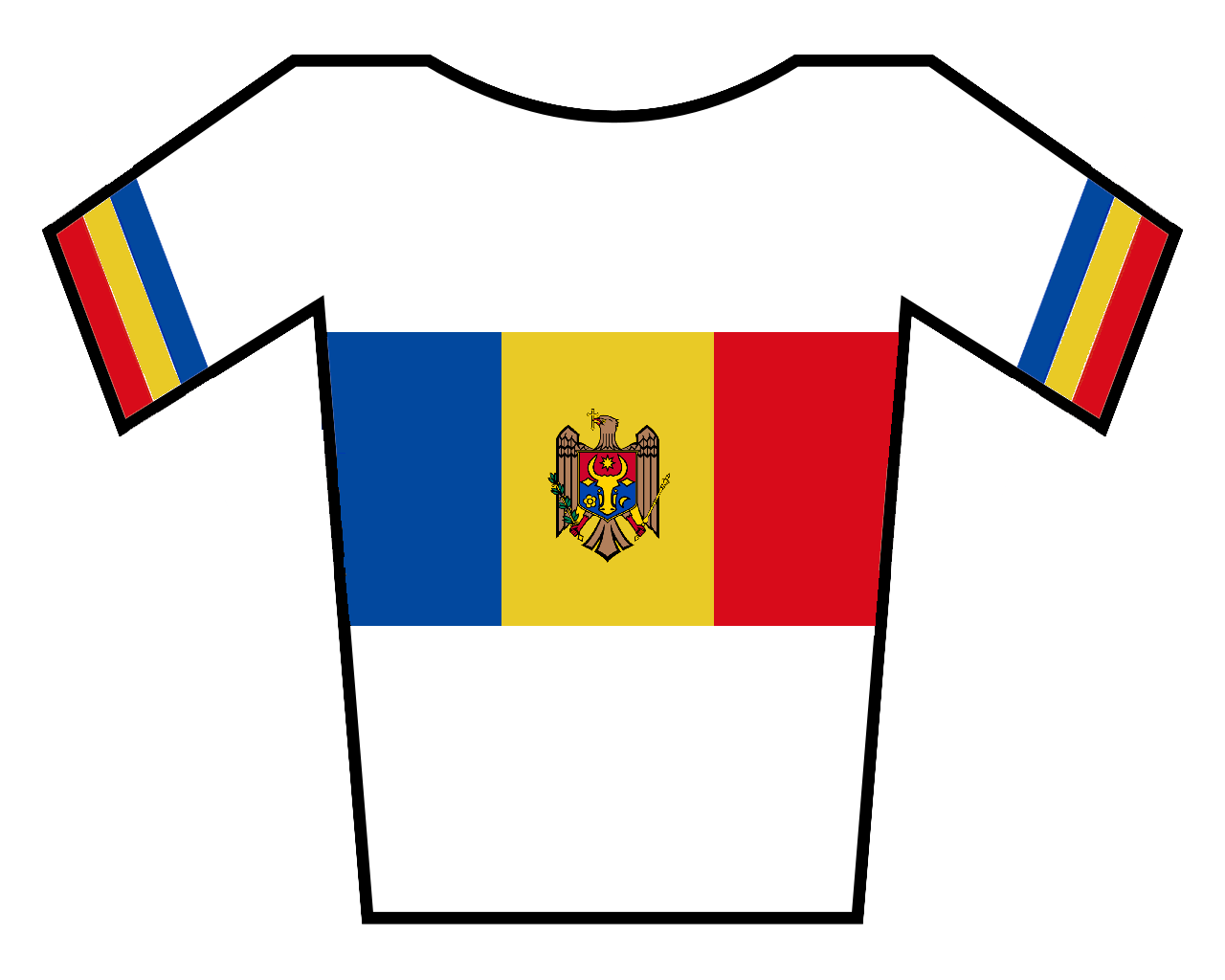

Race details
- Region: Moldova
- Local name: Campionatul Republicii Moldova la ciclism șosea - Cursa contratimp
- Discipline: Road bicycle racing
- Type: One-day
- Organiser: Moldavian Cycling Federation

History
- First edition: 1997
- Editions: 25 (as of 2026)
- First winner: Ruslan Ivanov
- Most wins: Sergiu Cioban (6 wins)
- Most recent: Daniel Babanschi

Cristian Raileanu as a National Time Trial Champion (2020)

The Moldovan National Time Trial Championships have been held since 1997.

The winners of each event are awarded with a symbolic cycling jersey featuring red, yellow and blue, the colors of the national flag, which can be worn by the rider at other time trialling events in the country to show their status as national champion. The champion's stripes can be combined into a sponsored rider's team kit design for this purpose.

== Multiple winners ==
Riders that managed to win the race more than once.

Wins	Rider	Years
6	Sergiu Cioban	2008, 2010, 2011, 2012, 2013, 2014
3	Igor Pugaci	1999, 2000, 2001
3	Cristian Raileanu	2019, 2020, 2021
2	Ruslan Ivanov	1997, 1998
2	Serghei Țvetcov	2007, 2009
2	Maxim Rusnac	2015, 2016
2	Nicolae Tanovițchii	2017, 2018

== Men ==
Year	Gold	Silver	Bronze
1997	Ruslan Ivanov	Igor Bonciucov	Igor Pugaci
1998	Ruslan Ivanov	Alexei Nazarenco	Igori Moscalev
1999	Igor Pugaci	Igor Bonciucov	Artiom Saraev
2000	Igor Pugaci	Igor Bonciucov	Serghei Smirnov
2001	Igor Pugaci	Ruslan Ivanov	Igor Bonciucov
2002– 2006	Not held		
2007	Serghei Țvetcov	Oleg Berdos	Sergiu Catan
2008	Sergiu Cioban	Victor Mironov	Serghei Țvetcov
2009	Serghei Țvetcov	Sergiu Cioban	Oleg Berdos
2010	Sergiu Cioban	Serghei Țvetcov	Mihail Gac
2011	Sergiu Cioban	Eugeniu Cozonac	Viktor Mironov
2012	Sergiu Cioban	Mihail Gac	Nicolae Tanovițchii
2013	Sergiu Cioban	Alexandr Braico	Veaceslav Verciuc
2014	Sergiu Cioban	Cristian Raileanu	Nicolae Tanovițchii
2015	Maxim Rusnac	Andrei Covalciuc	Cristian Raileanu
2016	Maxim Rusnac	Andrei Covalciuc	Alexandr Strelițov
2017	Nicolae Tanovițchii	Maxim Rusnac	Ivan Lutsenko
2018	Nicolae Tanovițchii	Andrei Vrabii	Vladislav Prudcoi
2019	Cristian Raileanu	Andrei Vrabii	Vladislav Korotaș
2020	Cristian Raileanu	Andrei Covaliciuc	Andrei Vrabii
2021	Cristian Raileanu	Andrei Vrabii	Andrei Sobennicov
2022	Arman Garibian	Andrei Sobennicov	Andrei Vrabii
2023	Ghennadii Morgun	Andrei Vrabii	Arman Garibian
2024	Daniel Babanschi	Arman Garibian	Andrei Vrabii
2025	Semion Culicenco	Ghennadii Morgun	Ilie Șeremet
2026	Ilie Șeremet	Andrei Haritonov	Dumitru Zagoreanu

== See also ==
- Moldovan National Road Race Championships
- National road cycling championships
