= Moldova at the 2019 European Games =

- IOC code: MDA
- NOC: National Olympic Committee of the Republic of Moldova

in Minsk, Belarus 21 – 30 June 2019
- Competitors: 50 in 10 sports
- Medals Ranked 36th: Gold 0 Silver 1 Bronze 4 Total 5

European Games appearances (overview)
- 2015; 2019; 2023; 2027

Moldova competed at the 2019 European Games, in Minsk, Belarus from 21 to 30 June 2019. Moldova has previously competed at the 2015 European Games in Baku, Azerbaijan, where it won 3 medals.

== Archery ==
Recurve

Athlete	Event	Ranking round		Round of 64	Round of 32	Round of 16	Quarterfinals	Semifinals	Final / BM	
Athlete	Event	Score	Seed	Opposition Score	Opposition Score	Opposition Score	Opposition Score	Opposition Score	Opposition Score	Rank
Dan Olaru	Men's individual	662	14	Bye	J. Klein (LUX); W 6–0	Van den Berg (NED); W 6–5	Acha (ESP); L2–6	Did not advance		
Alexandra Mîrca	Women's individual	641	15	Bye	Marchenko (UKR); L 2–6	Did not advance				
Dan Olaru; Alexandra Mîrca	Mixed team	1303	9	—	Switzerland; W 6–0	Belarus; L 2–6	Did not advance			9

== Badminton ==
Athletes	Event	Group stage				Round of 16	Quarterfinals	Semifinals	Final	Rank
Athletes	Event	Opposition Score	Opposition Score	Opposition Score	Rank	Opposition Score	Opposition Score	Opposition Score	Opposition Score	Rank
Cristian Savin	Men's singles	Rogalski (POL); L 0–2	Caljouw (NED); L 0–2	Atilano (POR); L 0–2	4	Did not advance				
Vlada Ginga	Women's singles	Kjærsfeldt (DEN); L 0–2	Polikarpova (ISR); L 0–2	Poghosyan (ARM); L 0–2	4	Did not advance				

== Boxing ==
Men

Athlete	Event	Round of 32	Round of 16	Quarterfinals	Semifinals	Final	
Athlete	Event	Opposition Result	Opposition Result	Opposition Result	Opposition Result	Opposition Result	Rank
Viktor Vacula	56 kg	—	Raman (GER); L RSC	Did not advance			
Dorin Bucşa	60 kg	Gálos (HUN); W 4–1	Chalabiyev (AZE); L 0–5	Did not advance			
Dmitri Galagoț	64 kg	Guruli (GEO); L 1–4	Did not advance				
Vasile Belous	69 kg	Wąchała (POL); W 5–0	Beqiri (ALB); W 3-2	Agrba (RUS); L 0–5	Did not advance		
Victor Carapcevschi	75 kg	Kiwan (BUL); W 5–0	Csemez (SVK); L 2–3	Did not advance			
Andrei Chiriacov	81 kg	Aas (EST); W 3–2	Nersesyan (ARM); L 0–5	Did not advance			
Andrei Zatusevschii	91 kg	Acar (TUR); L 0–5	Did not advance				
Alexei Zavatin	+91 kg	Bye	Milun (CRO); L 0–5	Did not advance			

Women

Athlete	Event	Round of 16	Quarterfinals	Semifinals	Final	
Athlete	Event	Opposition Result	Opposition Result	Opposition Result	Opposition Result	Rank
Cristina Cravcenco	60 kg	Testa (ITA); L 0–5	Did not advance			

== Canoe sprint ==
Men

Athlete	Event	Heats		Semifinal		Final	
Athlete	Event	Time	Rank	Time	Rank	Time	Rank
Oleg Tarnovschi	C–1 200 m	44.859	QS	42.247	7	Did not advance	
Oleg Tarnovschi	C–1 1000 m	4:08.746 QS	7	3:49.524	4	Did not advance	

Women

Athlete	Event	Heats		Semifinal		Final	
Athlete	Event	Time	Rank	Time	Rank	Time	Rank
Daniela Cociu	C–1 200 m	54.651	8	Did not advance			
Daniela Cociu; Maria Olărașu	C–2 500 m	2:01.075	QF	—		2:24.674	8

== Cycling ==
=== Road ===
Men

Athlete	Event	Time	Rank
Cristian Raileanu	Road race	4:10:58	31
Andrei Vrabii	Road race	4:27:29	113
Andrei Vrabii	Time trial	44.418	35
Veaceslav Rusnac	Road race	DNF	—
Arman Garibian	Road race	DNF	—
Vladislav Corotas	Road race	DNF	—
Vladislav Corotas	Time trial	44.132	36

== Judo ==
Men

Athlete	Event	Round of 64	Round of 32	Round of 16	Quarterfinals	Semifinals	Repechage	Final / BM	
Athlete	Event	Opposition Result	Opposition Result	Opposition Result	Opposition Result	Opposition Result	Opposition Result	Opposition Result	Rank
Denis Vieru	−66 kg	Bye	Zadro (BIH); W 1s2-0	Menaged (ISR); W 10-0s2	Niniashvili (GEO); L 0s1-1s2	Did not advance	Shershan (BLR); W 10s1-0s1	BM; Margvelashvili (GEO); L 0-10s1	5
Vadim Bunescu	−66 kg	Bye	Pérez Román (ESP); W 1s2-0s2	Margvelashvili (GEO); L 0-11	Did not advance				
Victor Sterpu	−73 kg	Kanivets (UKR); L 1s1-11	Did not advance						
Ion Nacu	−73 kg	Bye	Shavdatuashvili (GEO); L 0h–10s2	Did not advance					
Nicon Zaboroșciuc	−81 kg	Rajkai (HUN); L 0s2–1	Did not advance						

== Sambo ==
Men

Athlete	Event	Quarterfinals	Semifinals	Final / BM	
Athlete	Event	Opposition Result	Opposition Result	Opposition Result	Rank
Sergiu Oșlobanu	−82 kg	Yemelyanau (BLR); L 0–1	Repechage; Balampanasvili (GRE); W 4–1	Berulava (GEO); L 0–5	5
Denis Tachii	−100 kg	Segard (FRA); L 6–7	Repechage; Siranko (HUN); W 7–0	BM; Boloban (UKR); W 3–2	3rd place, bronze medalist(s)

Women

Athlete	Event	Quarterfinals	Semifinals	Final / BM	
Athlete	Event	Opposition Result	Opposition Result	Opposition Result	Rank
Paulina Eșanu	−52 kg	Zharskaya (BLR); L 0–1	Repechage; Reviláková (SVK); W DNF	BM; Buiok (UKR); W 1–1	3rd place, bronze medalist(s)
Mariana Donos	−56 kg	Gogua (GRE); L 0–2	Repechage; Ilkiv (UKR); L 0–0	Did not advance	7
Sabina Artemciuc	−60 kg	Abashidze (GEO); W 1–0	López Jiménez (ESP); W 1–0	Harelikava (BLR); L 0–1	2nd place, silver medalist(s)
Natalia Budeanu	−68 kg	Jarkowska (POL); W 2–1	Babić (CRO); L 2–3	BM; Mokhnatkina (RUS); L 0–0	5
Victoria Bolohan	−72 kg	Zhylinskaya (BLR); L 0–2	Repechage; Ambartsumian (RUS); L 1–1	Did not advance	7

== Shooting ==
Men

Athlete	Event	Qualification		Final	
Athlete	Event	Points	Rank	Points	Rank
Andrei Alferin	10 m air pistol	569	26	Did not advance	

== Table tennis ==
Athlete	Event	Round 1	Round 2	Round 3	Round 4	Quarterfinals	Semifinals	Final / BM	
Athlete	Event	Opposition Result	Opposition Result	Opposition Result	Opposition Result	Opposition Result	Opposition Result	Opposition Result	Rank
Andrei Puțuntică	Men's singles	Karakašević (SRB); L 1–4	Did not advance						

== Wrestling ==
Key:

- VFO – Victory by forfeit
- VPO – Victory by points – the loser without technical points
- VPO1 – Victory by points – the loser with technical points
- VSU – Victory by technical superiority – the loser without technical points and a margin of victory of at least 8 (Greco-Roman) or 10 (freestyle) points
- VSU1 – Victory by technical superiority – the loser with technical points and a margin of victory of at least 8 (Greco-Roman) or 10 (freestyle) points

Men's freestyle

Athlete	Event	Round of 16	Quarterfinals	Semifinals	Repechage	Final / BM	
Athlete	Event	Opposition Result	Opposition Result	Opposition Result	Opposition Result	Opposition Result	Rank
Alexandru Chirtoacă	−57 kg	Uguev (RUS); L 0−11^{VSU}	Did not advance				11
Andrei Perpelitsa	−65 kg	Bye	Khinchegashvili (GEO); L 1−4^{VPO1}	Did not advance	Bye	Chakaev (RUS); L 5−8^{VPO1}	5
Denis Balaur	−86 kg	Qostiyev (AZE); L 1−7^{VIN}	Did not advance				
Nicolae Ceban	−97 kg	Samartsidis (GRE); W 10−2^{VFA}	Mchedlidze (UKR); L 5−6^{VPO1}	Did not advance			
Shamhan Jabrailov	−125 kg	Chintoan (ROU); L 0−5^{VPO1}	Did not advance				

Men's Greco-Roman

Athlete	Event	Round of 16	Quarterfinals	Semifinals	Repechage	Final / BM	
Athlete	Event	Opposition Result	Opposition Result	Opposition Result	Opposition Result	Opposition Result	Rank
Victor Ciobanu	−60 kg	Maryanyan (RUS); L 1−9^{VSU1}	Did not advance		Kamal (TUR); W 10−9^{VPO1}	Abovian (UKR); W 3−1^{VPO1}	3rd place, bronze medalist(s)
Igor Beşleagă	−77 kg	Starčević (CRO); W 4−3^{VPO1}	Chalyan (ARM); L 1−2^{VPO1}	Did not advance	Nuraliyev (UKR); W 7−0^{VPO}	Lőrincz (HUN); L 1−5^{VPO1}	5
Viorel Burduja	−87 kg	Kułynycz (POL); L 3−5^{VFA}	Did not advance				

Women's freestyle

Athlete	Event	Round of 16	Quarterfinals	Semifinals	Repechage	Final / BM	
Athlete	Event	Opposition Result	Opposition Result	Opposition Result	Opposition Result	Opposition Result	Rank
Emilia Cîrîcu	−50 kg	Giagtzoglou (GRE); W 6−1^{VPO1}	Chyryk (BLR); L 0−6^{VPO}	Did not advance			
Iulia Leorda	−53 kg	Șeicariu (ROU); W 6−1^{VPO1}	Mattsson (SWE); L 0−10^{VSU}	Did not advance	Yetgil (TUR); L 3−8^{VPO1}	Did not advance	
Anastasia Nichita	−57 kg	Hocková (CZE); W 11−0^{VSU}	Chykhradze (UKR); W 4−2^{VFA}	Kurachkina (BLR); L 6−8^{VPO1}	Bye	BM Bullen (NOR); W 11−4^{VPO1}	3rd place, bronze medalist(s)
Mariana Cherdivara	−62 kg	Incze (ROU); L 0−2^{VPO}	Did not advance				
