= Rad am Ring =

Cycle racing festival held annually at the Nurburgring in Germany since 2003

Race details
- Date: July
- Region: Germany
- Discipline: Road race
- Competition: UCI Europe Tour
- Type: One day race
- Web site: www.radamring.de

History
- First edition: 2016
- Editions: 7 (as of 2024)
- First winner: Paul Voss (GER)
- Most recent: Miguel Heidemann (GER)

The Rad am Ring is a cycle racing festival held annually at the Nürburgring in Germany since 2003. It features road cycling and mountain bike races, including 24-hour races for each, and a cycling exposition.

Since 2016 it features a professional road race, also known in 2016 as the Rudi Altig Race, named after German cyclist Rudi Altig who won his Road Race World Championship at the Nürburgring and died shortly before the race. The first two editions were a 1.1 event on the UCI Europe Tour; since 2018 it is part of the German Bundesliga.

== Winners ==
Year	Country	Rider	Team
2016	Germany	Paul Voss	Bora–Argon 18
2017	Netherlands	Huub Duyn	Vérandas Willems–Crelan
2018	Luxembourg	Pit Leyder	Leopard Pro Cycling
2019	Germany	Christopher Hatz	Herrmann Radteam
2020– 2021	No race		
2022	Germany	Tom Lindner	P&S Benotti
2023	Germany	Jack Morrissey	Equipe Stuttgart-Vaihingen
2024	Germany	Miguel Heidemann	Team Felt–Felbermayr
