= 2019 Tour of Austria =

2019 UCI Europe Tour

Race details
- Dates: 6–12 July 2019
- Stages: 6 + Prologue
- Distance: 876.5 km (544.6 mi)
- Winning time: 22h 31' 22"

Results
| Jersey awarded to the overall winner | Winner | Ben Hermans (BEL) | (Israel Cycling Academy) |
| | Second | Eduardo Sepúlveda (ARG) | (Movistar Team) |
| | Third | Stefan De Bod (RSA) | (Team Dimension Data) |
| Jersey awarded to the points classification winner | Points | Jonas Koch (GER) | (Wanty–Gobert) |
| Jersey awarded to the mountains classification winner | Mountains | Georg Zimmermann (GER) | (Tirol KTM Cycling Team) |
| Jersey awarded to the young rider classification winner | Young rider | Vadim Pronskiy (KAZ) | (Vino–Astana Motors) |
| Jersey awarded to the team classification winner | Team | Team Dimension Data | |

The 2019 Tour of Austria (German: Österreich-Rundfahrt 2019) was the 71st edition of the Tour of Austria cycling stage race. It began with a prologue in Wels and finished atop the Kitzbüheler Horn after six road stages, covering 876.5 kilometres (544.6 mi). The race was ranked 2.1 in the 2019 UCI Europe Tour.

Ben Hermans, of Belgium and the Israel Cycling Academy team, won the race overall for the second consecutive year. Argentine rider Eduardo Sepúlveda, on Movistar Team, finished second ahead of Team Dimension Data's Stefan De Bod, of South Africa, in third. Jonas Koch, of Germany and EF Education First, won the points classification, while his countryman riding for Tirol KTM Cycling Team, Georg Zimmermann, won the mountains classification. Unlike previous editions, the 2019 Tour of Austria included a youth classification for the under-23 rider placed highest in the general classification. Kazakh rider Vadim Pronskiy, riding for Vino–Astana Motors, won the youth classification. The team classification was won by Team Dimension Data.

== Teams ==
Eighteen teams competed in the 2019 Tour of Austria, including three UCI WorldTeams, seven UCI Professional Continental Teams, and eight UCI Continental Teams. Most teams started with seven riders, except Wanty–Gobert, Arkéa–Samsic, and Wibatech Merx 7R, who started with six, and Vino–Astana Motors, starting with five riders. The list of teams competing is as follows.

UCI WorldTeams

- CCC Team
- Movistar Team
- Team Dimension Data

UCI Professional Continental teams

- Wanty–Gobert
- Arkéa–Samsic
- Wallonie Bruxelles
- Delko–Marseille Provence
- Gazprom–RusVelo
- Israel Cycling Academy
- Neri Sottoli–Selle Italia–KTM

UCI Continental teams

- SPORT.LAND. Niederösterreich Selle SMP–St. Rich
- Hrinkow Advarics Cycleang
- Wibatech Merx 7R
- Team Felbermayr–Simplon Wels
- Team Vorarlberg Santic
- Tirol KTM Cycling Team
- Maloja Pushbikers
- Vino–Astana Motors

== Route ==
Stage characteristics and winners
| Stage | Date | Course | Distance | Type | Winner |
|---|---|---|---|---|---|
| P | 6 July | Wels | 2.5 km (1.6 mi) | Individual Time Trial | Jannik Steimle (GER) |
| 1 | 7 July | Grieskirchen to Freistadt | 138.8 km (86.2 mi) | Medium mountain stage | Carlos Barbero (ESP) |
| 2 | 8 July | Zwettl to Wiener Neustadt | 176.9 km (109.9 mi) | Medium mountain stage | Tom Devriendt (BEL) |
| 3 | 9 July | Kirchschlag to Frohnleiten | 176.2 km (109.5 mi) | Mountain stage | Giovanni Visconti (ITA) |
| 4 | 10 July | Radstadt to Fuscher Törl | 103.5 km (64.3 mi) | Mountain stage | Ben Hermans (BEL) |
| 5 | 11 July | Bruck an der Großglocknerstraße to Kitzbühel | 161.9 km (100.6 mi) | Mountain stage | Jannik Steimle (GER) |
| 6 | 12 July | Kitzbühel to Kitzbüheler Horn | 116.7 km (72.5 mi) | Mountain stage | Aleksandr Vlasov (RUS) |

== Stages ==
=== Prologue ===
6 July 2019 – Wels, 2.5 km (1.6 mi), Individual Time Trial (ITT)

Prologue results
| Rank | Rider | Team | Time |
|---|---|---|---|
| 1 | Jannik Steimle (GER) | Team Vorarlberg Santic | 2' 50" |
| 2 | Matthias Brändle (AUT) | Israel Cycling Academy | + 01" |
| 3 | Pieter Vanspeybrouck (BEL) | Wanty–Gobert | + 03" |
| 4 | Tom Wirtgen (LUX) | Wallonie Bruxelles | + 04" |
| 5 | Emīls Liepiņš (LAT) | Wallonie Bruxelles | + 04" |
| 6 | Josef Černý (CZE) | CCC Team | + 05" |
| 7 | Tom Devriendt (BEL) | Wanty–Gobert | + 05" |
| 8 | Patrick Gamper (AUT) | Tirol KTM Cycling Team | + 06" |
| 9 | Łukasz Owsian (POL) | CCC Team | + 06" |
| 10 | Enrico Gasparotto (ITA) | Team Dimension Data | + 06" |

=== Stage 1 ===
7 July 2019 – Grieskirchen to Freistadt, 138.8 km (86.2 mi)

Stage 1 results
| Rank | Rider | Team | Time |
|---|---|---|---|
| 1 | Carlos Barbero (ESP) | Movistar Team | 3h 16' 00" |
| 2 | Emīls Liepiņš (LAT) | Wallonie Bruxelles | + 00" |
| 3 | Pieter Vanspeybrouck (BEL) | Wanty–Gobert | + 00" |
| 4 | Jonas Koch (GER) | CCC Team | + 00" |
| 5 | Jannik Steimle (GER) | Team Vorarlberg Santic | + 00" |
| 6 | Romain Hardy (FRA) | Arkéa–Samsic | + 00" |
| 7 | Franck Bonnamour (FRA) | Arkéa–Samsic | + 00" |
| 8 | Enrico Gasparotto (ITA) | Team Dimension Data | + 00" |
| 9 | Daniel Auer (AUT) | Maloja Pushbikers | + 00" |
| 10 | Alessandro Fedeli (ITA) | Delko–Marseille Provence | + 00" |

General classification after stage 1
| Rank | Rider | Team | Time |
|---|---|---|---|
| 1 | Emīls Liepiņš (LAT) | Wallonie Bruxelles | 3h 18' 48" |
| 2 | Pieter Vanspeybrouck (BEL) | Wanty–Gobert | + 01" |
| 3 | Jannik Steimle (GER) | Team Vorarlberg Santic | + 02" |
| 4 | Carlos Barbero (ESP) | Movistar Team | + 04" |
| 5 | Tom Wirtgen (LUX) | Wallonie Bruxelles | + 06" |
| 6 | Tom Devriendt (BEL) | Wanty–Gobert | + 07" |
| 7 | Patrick Gamper (AUT) | Tirol KTM Cycling Team | + 08" |
| 8 | Łukasz Owsian (POL) | CCC Team | + 08" |
| 9 | Enrico Gasparotto (ITA) | Team Dimension Data | + 08" |
| 10 | Jonas Koch (GER) | CCC Team | + 08" |

=== Stage 2 ===
8 July 2019 – Zwettl to Wiener Neustadt, 176.9 km (109.9 mi)

Stage 2 results
| Rank | Rider | Team | Time |
|---|---|---|---|
| 1 | Tom Devriendt (BEL) | Wanty–Gobert | 4h 18' 35" |
| 2 | Jannik Steimle (GER) | Team Vorarlberg Santic | + 00" |
| 3 | Jonas Koch (GER) | CCC Team | + 00" |
| 4 | Emīls Liepiņš (LAT) | Wallonie Bruxelles | + 00" |
| 5 | August Jensen (NOR) | Israel Cycling Academy | + 00" |
| 6 | Daniel Auer (AUT) | Maloja Pushbikers | + 00" |
| 7 | Pieter Vanspeybrouck (BEL) | Wanty–Gobert | + 00" |
| 8 | Romain Hardy (FRA) | Arkéa–Samsic | + 00" |
| 9 | Florian Gamper (AUT) | Tirol KTM Cycling Team | + 00" |
| 10 | Tom Wirtgen (LUX) | Wallonie Bruxelles | + 00" |

General classification after stage 2
| Rank | Rider | Team | Time |
|---|---|---|---|
| 1 | Jannik Steimle (GER) | Team Vorarlberg Santic | 7h 37' 19" |
| 2 | Tom Devriendt (BEL) | Wanty–Gobert | + 01" |
| 3 | Emīls Liepiņš (LAT) | Wallonie Bruxelles | + 04" |
| 4 | Matthias Krizek (AUT) | Team Felbermayr–Simplon Wels | + 05" |
| 5 | Pieter Vanspeybrouck (BEL) | Wanty–Gobert | + 05" |
| 6 | Carlos Barbero (ESP) | Movistar Team | + 08" |
| 7 | Jonas Koch (GER) | CCC Team | + 08" |
| 8 | Tom Wirtgen (LUX) | Wallonie Bruxelles | + 10" |
| 9 | Sebastian Schönberger (AUT) | Team Vorarlberg Santic | + 11" |
| 10 | Patrick Gamper (AUT) | Tirol KTM Cycling Team | + 12" |

=== Stage 3 ===
9 July 2019 – Kirchschlag to Frohnleiten, 176.2 km (109.5 mi)

Stage 3 results
| Rank | Rider | Team | Time |
|---|---|---|---|
| 1 | Giovanni Visconti (ITA) | Neri Sottoli–Selle Italia–KTM | 4h 53' 26" |
| 2 | Colin Stüssi (SUI) | Team Vorarlberg Santic | + 00" |
| 3 | Jonas Koch (GER) | CCC Team | + 00" |
| 4 | Ivan Rovny (RUS) | Gazprom–RusVelo | + 00" |
| 5 | Georg Zimmermann (GER) | Tirol KTM Cycling Team | + 00" |
| 6 | Dimitri Peyskens (BEL) | Wallonie Bruxelles | + 00" |
| 7 | Romain Combaud (FRA) | Delko–Marseille Provence | + 00" |
| 8 | Aleksandr Vlasov (RUS) | Gazprom–RusVelo | + 00" |
| 9 | Franck Bonnamour (FRA) | Arkéa–Samsic | + 00" |
| 10 | Alessandro Fedeli (ITA) | Delko–Marseille Provence | + 00" |

General classification after Stage 3
| Rank | Rider | Team | Time |
|---|---|---|---|
| 1 | Jonas Koch (GER) | CCC Team | 12h 30' 49" |
| 2 | Alessandro Fedeli (ITA) | Delko–Marseille Provence | + 01" |
| 3 | Giovanni Visconti (ITA) | Neri Sottoli–Selle Italia–KTM | + 01" |
| 4 | Sebastian Schönberger (AUT) | Neri Sottoli–Selle Italia–KTM | + 07" |
| 5 | Łukasz Owsian (POL) | CCC Team | + 08" |
| 6 | Colin Stüssi (SUI) | Team Vorarlberg Santic | + 08" |
| 7 | Rubén Fernández (ESP) | Movistar Team | + 09" |
| 8 | Tom-Jelte Slagter (NED) | Team Dimension Data | + 09" |
| 9 | Connor Swift (GBR) | Arkéa–Samsic | + 09" |
| 10 | Eliot Lietaer (BEL) | Wallonie Bruxelles | + 09" |

=== Stage 4 ===
10 July 2019 – Radstadt to Fuscher Törl, 103.5 km (64.3 mi)

Stage 4 results
| Rank | Rider | Team | Time |
|---|---|---|---|
| 1 | Ben Hermans (BEL) | Israel Cycling Academy | 3h 31' 32" |
| 2 | Ben O'Connor (AUS) | Team Dimension Data | + 06" |
| 3 | Winner Anacona (COL) | Movistar Team | + 09" |
| 4 | Eduardo Sepúlveda (ARG) | Movistar Team | + 23" |
| 5 | Stefan De Bod (RSA) | Team Dimension Data | + 38" |
| 6 | Riccardo Zoidl (AUT) | CCC Team | + 1' 02" |
| 7 | Víctor de la Parte (ESP) | CCC Team | + 1' 19" |
| 8 | Amanuel Ghebreigzabhier (ERI) | Team Dimension Data | + 1' 25" |
| 9 | Aleksandr Vlasov (RUS) | Gazprom–RusVelo | + 1' 25" |
| 10 | José Manuel Díaz (ESP) | Team Vorarlberg Santic | + 1' 39" |

General classification after Stage 4
| Rank | Rider | Team | Time |
|---|---|---|---|
| 1 | Ben Hermans (BEL) | Israel Cycling Academy | 15h 32' 23" |
| 2 | Ben O'Connor (AUS) | Team Dimension Data | + 08" |
| 3 | Winner Anacona (COL) | Movistar Team | + 13" |
| 4 | Eduardo Sepúlveda (ARG) | Movistar Team | + 34" |
| 5 | Stefan De Bod (RSA) | Team Dimension Data | + 47" |
| 6 | Riccardo Zoidl (AUT) | CCC Team | + 1' 10" |
| 7 | Víctor de la Parte (ESP) | CCC Team | + 1' 33" |
| 8 | Amanuel Ghebreigzabhier (ERI) | Team Dimension Data | + 1' 35" |
| 9 | Aleksandr Vlasov (RUS) | Gazprom–RusVelo | + 1' 40" |
| 10 | José Manuel Díaz (ESP) | Team Vorarlberg Santic | + 1' 56" |

=== Stage 5 ===
11 July 2019 – Bruck an der Großglocknerstraße to Kitzbühel, 161.9 km (100.6 mi)

Stage 5 results
| Rank | Rider | Team | Time |
|---|---|---|---|
| 1 | Jannik Steimle (GER) | Team Vorarlberg Santic | 4h 04' 09" |
| 2 | Jonas Koch (GER) | CCC Team | + 00" |
| 3 | Patrick Gamper (AUT) | Tirol KTM Cycling Team | + 00" |
| 4 | August Jensen (NOR) | Israel Cycling Academy | + 00" |
| 5 | Dayer Quintana (COL) | Neri Sottoli–Selle Italia–KTM | + 00" |
| 6 | Laurent Pichon (FRA) | Arkéa–Samsic | + 00" |
| 7 | Matthias Krizek (AUT) | Team Felbermayr–Simplon Wels | + 00" |
| 8 | Johannes Schinnagel (GER) | Maloja Pushbikers | + 00" |
| 9 | Colin Stüssi (SUI) | Team Vorarlberg Santic | + 00" |
| 10 | Eliot Lietaer (BEL) | Wallonie Bruxelles | + 00" |

General classification after Stage 5
| Rank | Rider | Team | Time |
|---|---|---|---|
| 1 | Ben Hermans (BEL) | Israel Cycling Academy | 19h 36' 32" |
| 2 | Ben O'Connor (AUS) | Team Dimension Data | + 08" |
| 3 | Winner Anacona (COL) | Movistar Team | + 13" |
| 4 | Eduardo Sepúlveda (ARG) | Movistar Team | + 34" |
| 5 | Stefan De Bod (RSA) | Team Dimension Data | + 47" |
| 6 | Riccardo Zoidl (AUT) | CCC Team | + 1' 10" |
| 7 | Víctor de la Parte (ESP) | CCC Team | + 1' 33" |
| 8 | Amanuel Ghebreigzabhier (ERI) | Team Dimension Data | + 1' 35" |
| 9 | Aleksandr Vlasov (RUS) | Gazprom–RusVelo | + 1' 40" |
| 10 | José Manuel Díaz (ESP) | Team Vorarlberg Santic | + 1' 56" |

=== Stage 6 ===
12 July 2019 – Kitzbühel to Kitzbüheler Horn, 116.7 km (72.5 mi)

Stage 6 result
| Rank | Rider | Team | Time |
|---|---|---|---|
| 1 | Aleksandr Vlasov (RUS) | Gazprom–RusVelo | 2h 54' 12" |
| 2 | Patrick Schelling (SUI) | Team Vorarlberg Santic | + 02" |
| 3 | Amanuel Ghebreigzabhier (ERI) | Team Dimension Data | + 20" |
| 4 | Eduardo Sepúlveda (ARG) | Movistar Team | + 24" |
| 5 | Stefan De Bod (RSA) | Team Dimension Data | + 29" |
| 6 | José Manuel Díaz (ESP) | Team Vorarlberg Santic | + 38" |
| 7 | Ben Hermans (BEL) | Israel Cycling Academy | + 38" |
| 8 | Riccardo Zoidl (AUT) | CCC Team | + 38" |
| 9 | Víctor de la Parte (ESP) | CCC Team | + 53" |
| 10 | Eliot Lietaer (BEL) | Wallonie Bruxelles | + 59" |

General classification after Stage 6
| Rank | Rider | Team | Time |
|---|---|---|---|
| 1 | Ben Hermans (BEL) | Israel Cycling Academy | 22h 31' 22" |
| 2 | Eduardo Sepúlveda (ARG) | Movistar Team | + 20" |
| 3 | Stefan De Bod (RSA) | Team Dimension Data | + 38" |
| 4 | Winner Anacona (COL) | Movistar Team | + 41" |
| 5 | Aleksandr Vlasov (RUS) | Gazprom–RusVelo | + 52" |
| 6 | Ben O'Connor (AUS) | Team Dimension Data | + 1' 08" |
| 7 | Riccardo Zoidl (AUT) | CCC Team | + 1' 10" |
| 8 | Amanuel Ghebreigzabhier (ERI) | Team Dimension Data | + 1' 13" |
| 9 | Patrick Schelling (SUI) | Team Vorarlberg Santic | + 2' 29" |
| 10 | Víctor de la Parte (ESP) | CCC Team | + 1' 48" |

== Classification leadership ==
| Stage | Winner | General classification | Points classification | Mountains classification | Young rider classification | Austrian rider classification | Team classification |
|---|---|---|---|---|---|---|---|
| P | Jannik Steimle | Jannik Steimle | Not awarded (Note: Though no sprint points were awarded during the Prologue, the second-place rider in the general classification, Matthias Brändle, wore the points jersey on Stage 1.) | Not awarded (Note: Though no mountains points were awarded during the Prologue, the third-place rider in the general classification, Pieter Vanspeybrouck, wore the mountains jersey on Stage 1.) | Patrick Gamper | Matthias Brändle | Wallonie Bruxelles |
| 1 | Carlos Barbero | Emīls Liepiņš | Carlos Barbero | Scott Davies | Patrick Gamper | Patrick Gamper | Wallonie Bruxelles |
| 2 | Tom Devriendt | Jannik Steimle | Emīls Liepiņš | Scott Davies | Patrick Gamper | Matthias Krizek | Wallonie Bruxelles |
| 3 | Giovanni Visconti | Jonas Koch | Jonas Koch (Note: On Stage 4, the second-place rider in the points classification, Emīls Liepiņš, wore the points jersey, as Jonas Koch wore the red overall leader's jersey.) | Georg Zimmermann | Georg Zimmermann | Sebastian Schönberger | Wanty–Gobert |
| 4 | Ben Hermans | Ben Hermans | Jonas Koch | Georg Zimmermann | Vadim Pronskiy | Riccardo Zoidl | Team Dimension Data |
| 5 | Jannik Steimle | Ben Hermans | Jonas Koch | Georg Zimmermann | Vadim Pronskiy | Riccardo Zoidl | Team Dimension Data |
| 6 | Aleksandr Vlasov | Ben Hermans | Jonas Koch | Georg Zimmermann | Vadim Pronskiy | Riccardo Zoidl | Team Dimension Data |
| Final | | Ben Hermans | Jonas Koch | Georg Zimmermann | Vadim Pronskiy | Riccardo Zoidl | Team Dimension Data |

== Final classification standings ==
Legend
| Denotes winner of the general classification | Denotes winner of the young rider classification |
| Denotes winner of the points classification | Denotes winner of the Austrian riders classification |
| Denotes winner of the mountains classification | Denotes winner of the team classification |

=== General classification ===
Final general classification (1-10)
| Rank | Rider | Team | Time |
|---|---|---|---|
| 1 | Ben Hermans (BEL) | Israel Cycling Academy | 22h 31' 22" |
| 2 | Eduardo Sepúlveda (ARG) | Movistar Team | + 20" |
| 3 | Stefan De Bod (RSA) | Team Dimension Data | + 38" |
| 4 | Winner Anacona (COL) | Movistar Team | + 41" |
| 5 | Alexander Vlasov (RUS) | Gazprom–RusVelo | + 52" |
| 6 | Ben O'Connor (AUS) | Team Dimension Data | + 1' 08" |
| 7 | Riccardo Zoidl (AUT) | CCC Team | + 1' 10" |
| 8 | Amanuel Ghebreigzabhier (ERI) | Team Dimension Data | + 1' 13" |
| 9 | Patrick Schelling (SUI) | Team Vorarlberg Santic | + 2' 29" |
| 10 | Víctor de la Parte (ESP) | CCC Team | + 1' 48" |

=== Points classification ===
Final points classification (1-10)
| Rank | Rider | Team | Points |
|---|---|---|---|
| 1 | Jonas Koch (GER) | CCC Team | 42 |
| 2 | Jannik Steimle (GER) | Team Vorarlberg Santic | 35 |
| 3 | Aleksandr Vlasov (RUS) | Gazprom–RusVelo | 22 |
| 4 | Ben Hermans (BEL) | Israel Cycling Academy | 20 |
| 5 | August Jensen (NOR) | Israel Cycling Academy | 19 |
| 6 | Matthias Krizek (AUT) | Team Felbermayr–Simplon Wels | 17 |
| 7 | Georg Zimmermann (GER) | Tirol KTM Cycling Team | 16 |
| 8 | Eduardo Sepúlveda (ARG) | Movistar Team | 16 |
| 9 | Colin Stüssi (SUI) | Team Vorarlberg Santic | 15 |
| 10 | Pieter Vanspeybrouck (BEL) | Wanty–Gobert | 15 |

=== Mountains classification ===
Final mountains classification (1-10)
| Rank | Rider | Team | Points |
|---|---|---|---|
| 1 | Georg Zimmermann (GER) | Tirol KTM Cycling Team | 45 |
| 2 | Ben Hermans (BEL) | Israel Cycling Academy | 24 |
| 3 | Thibault Guernalec (FRA) | Arkéa–Samsic | 24 |
| 4 | Scott Davies (GBR) | Team Dimension Data | 19 |
| 5 | Alexander Vlasov (RUS) | Gazprom–RusVelo | 15 |
| 6 | Mario Gamper (AUT) | Tirol KTM Cycling Team | 15 |
| 7 | Sebastian Schönberger (AUT) | Neri Sottoli–Selle Italia–KTM | 15 |
| 8 | Eduardo Sepúlveda (ARG) | Movistar Team | 12 |
| 9 | Ben O'Connor (AUS) | Team Dimension Data | 12 |
| 10 | Brice Feillu (FRA) | Arkéa–Samsic | 10 |

=== Young rider classification ===
Final young rider classification (1-10)
| Rank | Rider | Team | Time |
|---|---|---|---|
| 1 | Vadim Pronskiy (KAZ) | Vino–Astana Motors | 22h 46' 56" |
| 2 | Omar El Gouzi (ITA) | Tirol KTM Cycling Team | + 1' 21" |
| 3 | Georg Zimmermann (GER) | Tirol KTM Cycling Team | + 14' 47" |
| 4 | Patrick Gamper (AUT) | Tirol KTM Cycling Team | + 24' 27" |
| 5 | Thibault Guernalec (FRA) | Arkéa–Samsic | + 28' 03" |
| 6 | Alexandr Ovsyannikov (KAZ) | Vino–Astana Motors | + 29' 25" |
| 7 | Samuele Rivi (ITA) | Tirol KTM Cycling Team | + 29' 49" |
| 8 | Mario Gamper (AUT) | Tirol KTM Cycling Team | + 33' 11" |
| 9 | Felix Engelhardt (GER) | Tirol KTM Cycling Team | + 37' 00" |
| 10 | Stefan Kolb (AUT) | Maloja Pushbikers | + 49' 07" |

=== Austrian riders classification ===
Final Austrian riders classification (1-10)
| Rank | Rider | Team | Time |
|---|---|---|---|
| 1 | Riccardo Zoidl | CCC Team | 22h 32' 32" |
| 2 | Daniel Geismayr | Team Vorarlberg Santic | + 4' 56" |
| 3 | Sebastian Schönberger | Neri Sottoli–Selle Italia–KTM | + 13' 08" |
| 4 | Hans-Jörg Leopold | Maloja Pushbikers | + 13' 44" |
| 5 | Stephan Rabitsch | Team Felbermayr–Simplon Wels | + 13' 47" |
| 6 | Benjamin Brkic | Team Felbermayr–Simplon Wels | + 19' 37" |
| 7 | Matthias Krizek | Team Felbermayr–Simplon Wels | + 31' 14" |
| 8 | Patrick Gamper | Tirol KTM Cycling Team | + 38' 51" |
| 9 | Mario Gamper | Tirol KTM Cycling Team | + 47' 35" |
| 10 | Lukas Schlemmer | Maloja Pushbikers | + 50' 00" |

=== Team classification ===
Final team classification (1-10)
| Rank | Team | Time |
|---|---|---|
| 1 | Team Dimension Data | 67h 37' 09" |
| 2 | Team Vorarlberg Santic | + 5' 29" |
| 3 | CCC Team | + 6' 24" |
| 4 | Movistar Team | + 8' 04" |
| 5 | Gazprom–RusVelo | + 14' 31" |
| 6 | Neri Sottoli–Selle Italia–KTM | + 20' 07" |
| 7 | Wanty–Gobert | + 20' 57" |
| 8 | Delko–Marseille Provence | + 22' 33" |
| 9 | Arkéa–Samsic | + 27' 53" |
| 10 | Wibatech Merx 7R | + 33' 43" |
