= 2011 national road cycling championships =

The 2011 national road cycling championships began in January in Australia and New Zealand. Most of the European national championships take place in June.

== Jerseys ==
The winner of each national championship wears the national jersey in all their races for the next year in the respective discipline, apart from the World Championships, or unless they are wearing a category leader's jersey in a stage race. Most national champion jerseys tend to represent a country's flag or use the colours from it. Jerseys may also feature traditional sporting colours of a country that not derived from a national flag, such as the National colours of Australia on the jerseys of Australian national champions.

== 2011 champions ==
=== Men's Elite ===
Country	Men's Elite Road Race Champion	Champion's Current Team	Men's Elite Time Trial Champion	Champion's Current Team
Albania	Eugert Zhupa		Eugert Zhupa	
Algeria	Youcef Reguigui	Groupement Sportif Petrolier Algérie	Azzedine Lagab	Groupement Sportif Petrolier Algérie
Andorra			David Albós	CJAM-CKT-Novatec
Angola	Igor Silva		Igor Silva	
Argentina	Emanuel Saldaño	San Juan	Leandro Messineo	Río Negro
Antigua and Barbuda	Jyme Bridges		Marvin Spencer	
Australia	Jack Bobridge	Garmin–Cervélo	Cameron Meyer	Garmin–Cervélo
Austria	Matthias Krizek	Team 2000 Veneto Marchiol	Andreas Hofer	Tyrol Team
Bahamas	Tracy Sweeting		Mark Holowesko	
Barbados	Darren Matthews		Darren Matthews	
Belarus	Aleksandr Kuschynski	Team Katusha	Kanstantsin Sivtsov	HTC–Highroad
Belgium	Philippe Gilbert	Omega Pharma–Lotto	Philippe Gilbert	Omega Pharma–Lotto
Belize	Byron Pope		Byron Pope	
Bermuda	Darren Glasford		Neil De Sainte Croix	
Bolivia	Victor Tarqui		Óscar Soliz	
Brazil	Murilo Fischer	Garmin–Cervélo	Magno Nazaret	Funvic-Pindamonhangaba
British Virgin Islands	Orano Andrews		Orano Andrews	
Brunei	Muhammad Abd Aziz			
Bulgaria	Danail Petrov	Konya–Şekerspor–Torku–Vivelo	Nikolay Mihaylov	
Burkina Faso	Abdul Wahab Sawadogo			
Canada	Svein Tuft	SpiderTech–C10	Svein Tuft	SpiderTech–C10
Cayman Islands	Marius Deysel		Steve Abbott	
Chile	Gonzalo Garrido	Providencia OGM	Gonzalo Garrido	Providencia OGM
China			Liu Biao	Qinghai Tianyoude Cycling Team
Colombia	Weimar Roldán		Iván Casas	
Republic of the Congo	Jean-Pierre Wimana			
Costa Rica	Juan Manuel Mata		José Adrián Bonilla	Citi Economy Blue
Ivory Coast	Issiaka Fofana			
Croatia	Kristijan Đurasek	Loborika-Favorit Team	Kristijan Đurasek	Loborika-Favorit Team
Cuba	Arnold Alcolea		Arnold Alcolea	
Curaçao	Marc de Maar	Quick-Step	Marc de Maar	Quick-Step
Cyprus	Marios Athanasiadis		Vassilis Adamou	
Czech Republic	Petr Benčik	PSK Whirlpool-Author	Jiri Hudeček	PSK Whirlpool-Author
Denmark	Nicki Sørensen	Saxo Bank–SunGard	Rasmus Quaade	Team Concordia Forsikring-Himmerland
Ecuador	Wilson Panaluisa	Pichincha	José Ragonessi	Pichincha
El Salvador	Omar Benítez		Omar Benítez	
Estonia	Mart Ojavee	Champion System	Rein Taaramäe	Cofidis
Eritrea	Freqalsi Debesay		Daniel Teklehaimanot	
France	Sylvain Chavanel	Quick-Step	Christophe Kern	Team Europcar
Finland	Kjell Carlström	Team Sky	Aki Turunen	
Germany	Robert Wagner	Leopard Trek	Bert Grabsch	HTC–Highroad
Greece	Ioannis Tamouridis	SP Tableware	Ioannis Tamouridis	SP Tableware
Guatemala	Julián Yac	Café Quetzal	Luis Alberto Santizo	
Guyana	Walter Grant-Stuart			
Honduras	Pablo Crúz			
Hong Kong	Yeung Ying-Hon	Racing Force		
Hungary	Krisztián Lovassy	Ora Hotels-Carrera	Gábor Fejes	
Georgia	Giorgi Nadiradze		Giorgi Nadiradze	
Iceland	Hafsteinn Geirsson		Hafsteinn Geirsson	
Iran	Abbas Saeidi	Azad University	Hossein Askari	Tabriz Petrochemical Cycling Team
Ireland	Matthew Brammeier	HTC–Highroad	Matthew Brammeier	HTC–Highroad
Israel	Niv Libner	Amore & Vita	Ayal Rahat	
Italy	Giovanni Visconti	Farnese Vini–Neri Sottoli	Adriano Malori	Lampre–ISD
Jamaica	Shaquille Sinclair		Michael Daley	
Japan	Fumiyuki Beppu	Team RadioShack	Fumiyuki Beppu	Team RadioShack
Kazakhstan	Andrey Mizurov	Astana	Dmitriy Gruzdev	
Kyrgyzstan	Evgeny Vakker	LeTua Cycling Team	Evgeny Vakker	LeTua Cycling Team
Latvia	Martins Trautmanis		Gatis Smukulis	HTC–Highroad
Lebanon	Salah Ribah			
Liechtenstein	Hans Burkhard		Hans Burkhard	
Lesotho	Phetetso Monese		Phetetso Monese	
Lithuania	Ramūnas Navardauskas	Garmin–Cervélo	Gediminas Bagdonas	An Post–Sean Kelly
Luxembourg	Fränk Schleck	Leopard Trek	Christian Poos	Team Differdange-Magic-Sportfood.de
Macedonia	Stefan Petrovski		Boban Andevski	
Madagascar	Jean Rakotondrasoa		Jaoherivelo Adrianjaka	
Malawi	Ronald Tsoyo			
Malaysia	Mohamed Mat Amin	Terengganu Pro Asia Cycling Team		
Mali	Hamidou Diarra			
Malta	Etienne Bonello		Etienne Bonello	
Mauritius	Thomas Desvaux		Yannick Lincoln	
Mongolia	Altanzul Altansukh		Baasankhuu Myagmarsuren	
Moldova	Alexandre Pliușchin	Team Katusha	Sergiu Cioban	Tuşnad Cycling Team
Morocco	Adil Jelloul		Mouhssine Lahsaini	
Mexico	Gregorio Ladino		Bernardo Colex	Amore & Vita
Namibia	Lotto Petrus	MTN-Qhubeka	Lotto Petrus	MTN-Qhubeka
Netherlands	Pim Ligthart	Vacansoleil–DCM	Stef Clement	Rabobank
Nicaragua	Jorge Marcenaro			
New Zealand	Hayden Roulston	HTC–Highroad	Westley Gough	Subway-Avanti
Norway	Alexander Kristoff	BMC Racing Team	Edvald Boasson Hagen	Team Sky
Panama	Nicolas Tenorio		Ramón Carretero	
Pakistan	Ahat Abdul		Ali Muhammad Sabir	
Peru	Jesus Nakada		Eduardo Schiantarelli	
Poland	Tomasz Marczyński	CCC–Polsat–Polkowice	Tomasz Marczyński	CCC–Polsat–Polkowice
Portugal	João Cabreira	Onda	Nelson Oliveira	Team RadioShack
Puerto Rico	Efren Ortega		Efren Ortega	
Romania	Andrei Nechita		Bogdan Coman	
Russia	Pavel Brutt	Team Katusha	Mikhail Ignatiev	Team Katusha
Rwanda	Adrien Niyonshuti	MTN-Qhubeka		
Saint Lucia	Kurt Maraj		Kirk Maraj	
Saint Vincent and the Grenadines	Deptor Culzac			
Saint Kitts and Nevis	Reggie Douglas		James Weekes	
Serbia	Zsolt Dér		Zsolt Dér	
Singapore	Lemuel Lee		Darren Low	
Slovakia	Peter Sagan	Liquigas–Cannondale	Pavol Polievka	Trek-Oslany
Slovenia	Grega Bole	Lampre–ISD	Janez Brajkovič	Team RadioShack
South Africa	Darren Lill		Daryl Impey	MTN-Qhubeka
South Korea	Jang Sun-jae		Choe Hyeong-min	Geumsan Ginseng Asia
Spain	José Joaquín Rojas	Movistar Team	Luis León Sánchez	Rabobank
Suriname	Murwin Arumjo		Ruiz Ceder	
Sweden	Philip Lindau	Team CykelCity	Gustav Larsson	Saxo Bank–SunGard
Switzerland	Fabian Cancellara	Leopard Trek	Martin Kohler	BMC Racing Team
Taiwan	Feng Chun-kai	Action Cycling Team		
Thailand	Seree Ruengiri			
Tunisia	Ahmed Ben Matoog		Riadh Ghdamsi	
Turkey	Kemal Küçükbay	Brisaspor	Mert Mutlu	Brisaspor
Trinidad and Tobago	Emile Abraham		Kevin Tinto	
Ukraine	Oleksandr Kvachuk	Lampre–ISD	Oleksandr Kvachuk	Lampre–ISD
United Kingdom	Bradley Wiggins	Team Sky	Alex Dowsett	Team Sky
United Arab Emirates	Badr Banihammad		Yousif Banihammad	
United States	Matthew Busche	Team RadioShack	David Zabriskie	Garmin–Cervélo
Uzbekistan	Sergey Lagutin	Vacansoleil–DCM	Muradjan Khalmuratov	
Venezuela	Miguel Ubeto	Lotería del Táchira	José Isidro Chacón	Lotería del Táchira
Zimbabwe	Bright Chipongo		Dave Martin	

=== Women's ===
Country	Women's Road Race Champion	Women's Time Trial Champion
Argentina	Stefanía Pilz	Valeria Müller
Antigua and Barbuda		
Australia	Alexis Rhodes	Shara Gillow
Austria		
Bahamas		
Belarus		Alena Amialiusik
Belgium	Evelyn Arys	
Bermuda		
Bolivia		
Brazil		Luciene Ferreira Silva
Canada	Véronique Fortin	Clara Hughes
Chile		
Colombia		
Costa Rica		
Croatia		Mia Radotić
Cuba		
Cyprus		
Czech Republic		Martina Sáblíková
Dominican Republic		
Denmark	Julie Leth	Annika Langvad
Ecuador		Maria Parra Constante
El Salvador		
Estonia		
France	Christel Ferrier-Bruneau	Jeannie Longo
Finland	Pia Sundstedt	Pia Sundstedt
Germany		Judith Arndt
Guatemala	Flory León González	María Dolores Molina
Hong Kong	Jamie Wong	
Hungary		Krisztina Fay
Ireland		
Israel		
Italy	Noemi Cantele	Noemi Cantele
Japan		
Kazakhstan		
Latvia		
Lithuania	Rasa Leleivytė	Aušrinė Trebaitė
Luxembourg		Christine Majerus
Malaysia		
Mexico	Dulce Pliego	Verónica Leal
Mongolia		
Namibia		
Netherlands	Marianne Vos	Marianne Vos
Netherlands Antilles		
New Zealand	Catherine Cheatley	Sonia Waddell
Norway		Camilla Hott-Johansen
Poland		Maja Włoszczowska
Portugal		
Puerto Rico		
Russia		Alexandra Burchenkova
Saint Kitts and Nevis		
Serbia		
Singapore		
Slovakia		
Slovenia		
South Africa	Marissa van der Merwe	Cherise Taylor
Spain		Eneritz Iturriagaechevarria Mazaga
Sweden		Emilia Fahlin
Switzerland		Pascale Schnider
Turkey	Gül Çelebi	Merve Tayfun Marmara
Ukraine		
United Kingdom	Elizabeth Armitstead	Wendy Houvenaghel
United States	Robin Farina	Evelyn Stevens
Venezuela	Angie González	Danielys García
Zimbabwe		

=== Men's Under-23 ===
Country	Men's Under-23 Road Race Champion	Men's Under-23 Time Trial Champion
Argentina	Gabriel Juárez	Eduardo Sepúlveda
Australia	Ben Dyball	Luke Durbridge
Belarus		
Belgium		
Bolivia		
Brazil		
Canada		
Chile		
China		
Colombia		
Costa Rica		
Croatia		
Cyprus		
Czech Republic		
Denmark		
Dominican Republic		
Ecuador		Cleber Cuasquer
Estonia		Karlo Aia
Germany		
Guatemala	Walter Escobar	
Hong Kong	Choi Ki-Ho	
Hungary		
Ireland		
Italy		
Japan		
Kazakhstan		
Luxembourg		
Mexico		
Macedonia		
Netherlands	Ramon Sinkeldam	Wilco Kelderman
New Zealand	Michael Vink	Jason Christie
Norway		
Peru		
Poland		
Portugal		
Romania		
Russia		
Slovenia		
South Africa		Johann Van Zyl
Spain		
Sweden		
Switzerland		
Turkey	Muhammet Keleş	
Ukraine		
United Kingdom	Scott Thwaites	
Uruguay		
United States		
Uzbekistan		
Venezuela		
