= Cycling at the 2019 European Games – Men's road time trial =

Men's road time trial at the 2019 European Games
- Venue: Minsk (28.6 km)
- Date: 25 June
- Competitors: 37 from 25 nations
- Winning time: 33:03.34

Medalists
gold medal	Vasil Kiryienka	Belarus
silver medal	Nelson Oliveira	Portugal
bronze medal	Jan Bárta	Czech Republic

The men's road time trial cycling event at the 2019 European Games in Minsk took place over a distance of 28.6 km on 25 June.

== Results ==
Rank	Bib	Start order	Rider	Nation	Time	Behind
1st place, gold medalist(s)	32	8	Vasil Kiryienka	Belarus	33:03.34	
2nd place, silver medalist(s)	6	34	Nelson Oliveira	Portugal	33:31.82	+28.48
3rd place, bronze medalist(s)	3	37	Jan Bárta	Czech Republic	33:40.47	+37.13
4	5	35	Ryan Mullen	Ireland	33:41.43	+38.09
5	34	6	Gediminas Bagdonas	Lithuania	34:16.54	+1:13.20
6	29	11	Michael O'Loughlin	Ireland	34:32.69	+1:29.35
7	30	10	Anton Vorobyev	Russia	34:35.32	+1:31.98
8	27	13	Jakub Otruba	Czech Republic	34:46.04	+1:42.70
9	13	27	Serghei Țvetcov	Romania	34:46.53	+1:43.19
10	25	15	Christopher Hatz	Germany	34:48.63	+1:45.29
11	1	39	Nico Denz	Germany	35:01.17	+1:57.83
12	7	33	Artem Nych	Russia	35:07.44	+2:04.10
13	19	21	János Pelikán	Hungary	35:09.09	+2:05.75
14	2	38	Jaka Primožič	Slovenia	35:22.57	+2:19.23
15	12	28	Branislau Samoilau	Belarus	35:22.84	+2:19.50
16	21	19	Andreas Miltiadis	Cyprus	35:35.27	+2:31.93
17	31	9	Oleksandr Golovash	Ukraine	35:40.21	+2:36.87
18	9	31	Norman Vahtra	Estonia	35:55.63	+2:52.29
19	15	25	Ramūnas Navardauskas	Lithuania	35:55.79	+2:52.45
20	10	30	Aleksejs Saramotins	Latvia	35:58.65	+2:55.31
21	26	14	Nik Čemažar	Slovenia	35:59.32	+2:55.98
22	11	29	Andriy Vasylyuk	Ukraine	36:03.03	+2:59.69
23	28	12	Marek Čanecký	Slovakia	36:16.33	+3:12.99
24	14	26	Mustafa Sayar	Turkey	36:33.08	+3:29.74
25	33	7	Eduard-Michael Grosu	Romania	36:38.49	+3:35.15
26	16	24	Antonio Barać	Croatia	36:43.78	+3:40.44
27	20	20	Itamar Einhorn	Israel	36:47.23	+3:43.89
28	22	18	Andrej Petrovski	North Macedonia	36:49.11	+3:45.77
29	17	23	Elchin Asadov	Azerbaijan	36:50.80	+3:47.46
30	4	36	Patrik Tybor	Slovakia	36:56.76	+3:53.42
31	35	5	Samir Jabrayilov	Azerbaijan	37:39.39	+4:36.05
32	37	3	Alexandros Matsangos	Cyprus	37:58.22	+4:54.88
33	23	17	Vedad Karić	Bosnia and Herzegovina	38:05.69	+5:02.35
34	24	16	Victor Langellotti	Monaco	38:14.25	+5:10.91
35	18	22	Andrei Vrabii	Moldova	38:38.80	+5:35.46
36	36	4	Vladislav Korotas	Moldova	38:53.38	+5:50.04
37	39	1	Tengiz Barbakadze	Georgia	40:40.10	+7:36.76
	8	32	Tiago Da Silva	Luxembourg	Did not start	
	38	2	Eugert Zhupa	Albania	Did not start	
