= Alexandr Braico =

Moldavan cyclist (born 1988)

Personal information
- Full name: Alexandr Braico
- Born: 5 March 1988 (age 38) Ungheni, Moldavian SSR, Soviet Union (now Moldova)

Cycling career
- Sport: Cycling
- Current team: Retired
- Discipline: Road
- Role: Rider

Professional teams
- 2008: Olimpic Team Autoconstruct
- 2009–2014: Tuşnad Cycling Team
- 2015–2016: Jelly Belly–Maxxis

Alexandr Braico (born 5 March 1988) is a Moldovan former professional racing cyclist, who rode professionally between 2008 and 2016 for the Olimpic Team Autoconstruct, Tuşnad Cycling Team and Jelly Belly–Maxxis teams.

He rode in the men's team time trial at the 2015 UCI Road World Championships.

== Major results ==
2007
3rd Road race, National Road Championships
2009
2nd Road race, National Road Championships
2010
2nd Road race, National Road Championships
2012
3rd Road race, National Road Championships
2013
2nd Time trial, National Road Championships
6th Overall Tour of Szeklerland
9th Overall Tour of Romania
2014
2nd Road race, National Road Championships
5th Overall Tour of Szeklerland
