= Nicolae Tanovițchii =

Moldovan cyclist

Personal information
- Full name: Nicolae Tanovițchii
- Born: 23 December 1993 (age 32)
- Height: 1.84 m (6 ft 0 in)
- Weight: 73 kg (161 lb)

Cycling career
- Sport: Cycling
- Discipline: Road
- Role: Rider

Amateur teams
- 2014: Virtus Villa
- 2017: Cervelo

Professional teams
- 2012: Start Cycling Team–Atacama Flowery Desert
- 2013: Tuşnad Cycling Team
- 2015: Jelly Belly–Maxxis
- 2016: Lupus Racing Team
- 2017: Tusnad Cycling Team
- 2018–2019: Team Novak

Nicolae Tanovițchii (born 23 December 1993) is a former Moldovan professional racing cyclist, who last rode for UCI Continental team Team Novak. He rode in the men's team time trial at the 2015 UCI Road World Championships.

== Major results ==
2012
3rd Time trial, National Road Championships
2013
1st Time trial, National Under-23 Road Championships
9th Overall Tour of Bulgaria

1st Young rider classification

2014
3rd Time trial, National Road Championships
2015
10th Winston-Salem Cycling Classic
2016
7th The Reading 120
2017
National Road Championships

1st Time trial
1st Road race

3rd Overall Tour of Szeklerland

1st Prologue

3rd Overall Tour of Bulgaria North
3rd Coppa della Pace
2018
National Road Championships

1st Time trial
2nd Road race

1st Overall Tour of Szeklerland

1st Stage 4a (ITT)

3rd Overall Grand Prix Cycliste de Gemenc
