= Chrono Kristin Armstrong =

Road cycling race in Idaho, United States

Race details
- Date: July
- Region: Idaho
- Discipline: Road
- Competition: UCI America Tour
- Type: Single day race
- Web site: chronokristinarmstrong.com

History
- First edition: 2018
- Editions: 2 (as of 2019)
- First winner: Serghei Țvetcov (ROM)
- Most wins: Serghei Țvetcov (ROM) (2 times)
- Most recent: Serghei Țvetcov (ROM)

The Chrono Kristin Armstrong is a professional one-day road cycling race held annually in Idaho, United States. It is part of UCI America Tour in category 1.2.

== Winners ==
Year	Country	Rider	Team
2018	Romania	Serghei Țvetcov	UnitedHealthcare
2019	Romania	Serghei Țvetcov	Floyd's Pro Cycling
