= Moldavian Cycling Federation =

National governing body of cycle racing in Moldova

- Federaţia de ciclism din Republica Moldova
- Abbreviation: FCRM
- Headquarters: Chișinău, Moldova
- Location: Str. Trandafirilor 6/3, Chișinău, Moldova
- Official language: Romanian
- President: Codreanu Deonisii
- Affiliations: Union Cycliste Internationale (UCI), European Cycling Union (UEC)
- Website: fcrm.md

The Moldavian Cycling Federation (Romanian: Federaţia de ciclism din Republica Moldova), abbreviated to FCM, is the national governing body of cycle racing in Moldova.

The FCRM is a member of the UCI and the UEC.

== See also ==
- Moldovan National Road Race Championships
- Moldovan National Time Trial Championships
