= Albania at the 2019 European Games =

- IOC code: ALB
- NOC: Albanian National Olympic Committee
- Website: nocalbania.org.al

in Minsk, Belarus 21 June 2019 – 30 June 2019
- Competitors: 12 in 6 sports
- Flag bearer: Krenar Zeneli (boxing)
- Medals Ranked 44th: Gold 0 Silver 0 Bronze 0 Total 0

European Games appearances (overview)
- 2015; 2019; 2023; 2027

Albania participated at the 2019 European Games in Minsk, Belarus, held between 21 and 30 June 2019. The country's participation in Minsk marked its second appearance at the European Games since its debut in the inaugural 2015 European Games.

The Albanian team consisted of 12 athletes competing across six sports. Boxer Krenar Zeneli was the country's flag-bearer during the opening ceremony. The country did not win a medal in the Games, and as of these Games, Albania had not earned a European Games medal.

== Background ==
The Albanian National Olympic Committee is a member of the International Olympic Committee and the legal authority of Albania's participation in international multi-sport events. The nation made its European Games debut at the first 2015 European Games held in Baku, Azerbaijan. This edition of the Games marked the nation's second appearance at the European Games.

The 2019 European Games were held in Minsk, Belarus between 21 and 30 June 2019. About 3,500 athletes from 50 countries competed in 200 medal events across 15 sports in the Games. The Albanian delegation consisted of 12 members. Krenar Zenali was the country's flag-bearer during the opening ceremony. Albania did not win a medal in the Games, and as of these Games, had not earned a European Games medal.

== Archery ==
Albania received a universality place and sent a lone athlete Jurgen Hoxha for the men's individual event in recurve archery. The men's individual competition was held from 21 to 27 June 2019 at the Olympic Sports Complex in Minsk. Hoxha was seeded 48th after finishing with 556 points from a possible 600 in the ranking round. In the round of 64, he lost to Tom Hall of Great Britain and bowed out of the competition.

Men

Athlete	Event	Ranking round		Round of 64	Round of 32	Round of 16	Quarterfinals	Semifinals	Final / BM	
Athlete	Event	Score	Seed	Opposition Score	Opposition Score	Opposition Score	Opposition Score	Opposition Score	Opposition Score	Rank
Jurgen Hoxha	Individual recurve	556	48	Hall (GBR); L 0-6	Did not advance					

== Boxing ==
The European Boxing Confederation allowed each National Olympic Committee (NOC) to nominate onle entry per weight category for the men's event. Albania sent four athletes for the men's event in boxing.

Boxing matches were contested between 21 and 30 June 2019 at the Uruchie Sports Palace. In the 56 kg event, Krenar Zeneli won the round of 16 before losing to Peter McGrail of Great Britain in the quarterfinals. In the 69 kg event, Alban Beqiri won his first round bout before he lost to Vasile Belous of Moldova in the second round. Arjon Kajoshi and Mikel Culljaj lost their first round bouts in the 75 kg and 81 kg categories respectively.

Men

Athlete	Event	Round of 32	Round of 16	Quarterfinals	Semifinals	Final	
Athlete	Event	Opposition Result	Opposition Result	Opposition Result	Opposition Result	Opposition Result	Rank
Krenar Zeneli	56 kg	Bye	Pugno (SUI); W 5-0	Grail (GBR); L 0-5	Did not advance		
Alban Beqiri	69 kg	Yahia Berrouiguet (FRA); W 4-1	Belous (MDA); L 2-3	Did not advance			
Arjon Kajoshi	75 kg	Pankou (BLR); L 1-4	Did not advance				
Mikel Cullhaj	81 kg	Kasparian (NED); L 0-5	Did not advance				

== Cycling ==
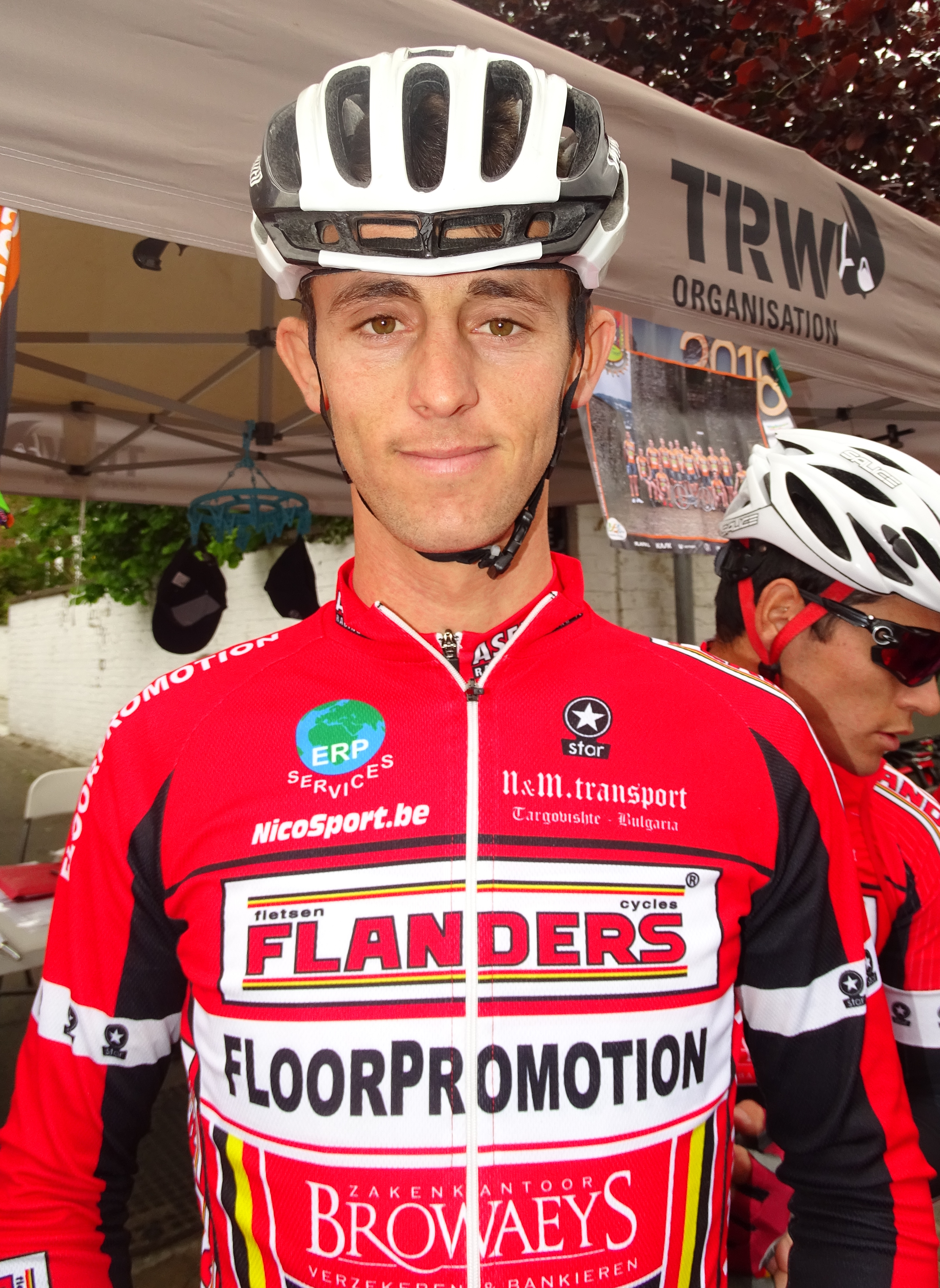
Ylber Sefa finished 72nd in the men's road race

Quota places for the road cycling events were allocated based on the UCI World Rankings at 31 December 2018, while the quota places for the track cycling events were based on the UCI ranking after the 2019 UCI Track Cycling World Championships. Albania qualified three athletes for the road events.

The men's road race cycling event at the 2019 European Games took place on 23 June. Ylber Sefa was classified in 72nd position amongst the 116 finishers while Klidi Jaku failed to finish the competition. In the time trial event held on 25 June, Eugert Zhupa was not classified.

Men

Athlete	Event	Time	Rank
Klidi Jaku	Road race	Did not finish	
Ylber Sefa	Road race	4:11:14	72
Eugert Zhupa	Time trial	Did not start	

== Judo ==
Albania qualified one judoka for the men's 66 kg event at the European Games, which was held on 22 June at the Čyžoŭka-Arena. Indrit Cullhaj lost in the first round to Adrian Gomboc of Slovenia by an ippon.

Men

Athlete	Event	Round of 32	Round of 16	Quarterfinals	Semifinals	Repechage	Final / BM	
Athlete	Event	Opposition Result	Opposition Result	Opposition Result	Opposition Result	Opposition Result	Opposition Result	Rank
Indrit Cullhaj	66 kg	Gomboc (SLO); L 00-10	Did not advance					

== Shooting ==
For the individual events in sport shooting, top 24 athletes in the European ranking lists as of 31 December 2018 were awarded one quota place for their NOCs with a maximum quota of one per NOC per event. Athletes qualifying for individual events were allowed to participate as a team in the mixed team events. As per the qualifying criteria, Albania qualified two athletes– Henri Rufa in the men's 10 m air pistol and Manuela Delilaj in two events in the women's pistol shooting.

In the men's pistol event held on 23 June, Rrufa scored 554 points to be ranked 27th and failed to qualify for the final. Delilaj also failed to qualify for the final in the 10 m air pistol and 25 m pistol events after being ranked respectively in the qualifying rounds. In the 10 m mixed team event, both the shooters combined for a score of 554 to be ranked 27th and failed to advance to the final.

Men

Athlete	Event	Qualification		Final	
Athlete	Event	Points	Rank	Points	Rank
Henri Rrufa	10 m air pistol	542	36	Did not advance	

Women

Athlete	Event	Qualification		Final	
Athlete	Event	Points	Rank	Points	Rank
Manuela Delilaj	10 m air pistol	558	28	Did not advance	
Manuela Delilaj	25 m pistol	557	33	Did not advance	

Mixed

Athlete	Event	Qualification				Final / BM	
Athlete	Event	Stage 1		Stage 2		Final / BM	
Athlete	Event	Points	Rank	Points	Rank	Opposition Result	Rank
Henri Rrufa; Manuela Delilaj	10 m air pistol	554	27	Did not advance			

== Wrestling ==
Albania qualified a single athlete for the men's freestyle wrestling event at the Games. The wrestling events were held at the Minsk Sports Palace from 25 to 30 June. In the 65 kg category Eriglent Prizren lost his round of 16 bout to Alexandru Chirtoacă of Moldova and failed to win a medal.

Key:

- VPO1 – Victory by points – the loser with technical points

Men's freestyle

Athlete	Event	Round of 16	Quarterfinals	Semifinals	Repechage	Final / BM	
Athlete	Event	Opposition Result	Opposition Result	Opposition Result	Opposition Result	Opposition Result	Rank
Eriglent Prizreni	−65 kg	Chirtoacă (MDA); L 1−1^{VPO1}	Did not advance				
