= Jack Burke (cyclist) =

Canadian cyclist

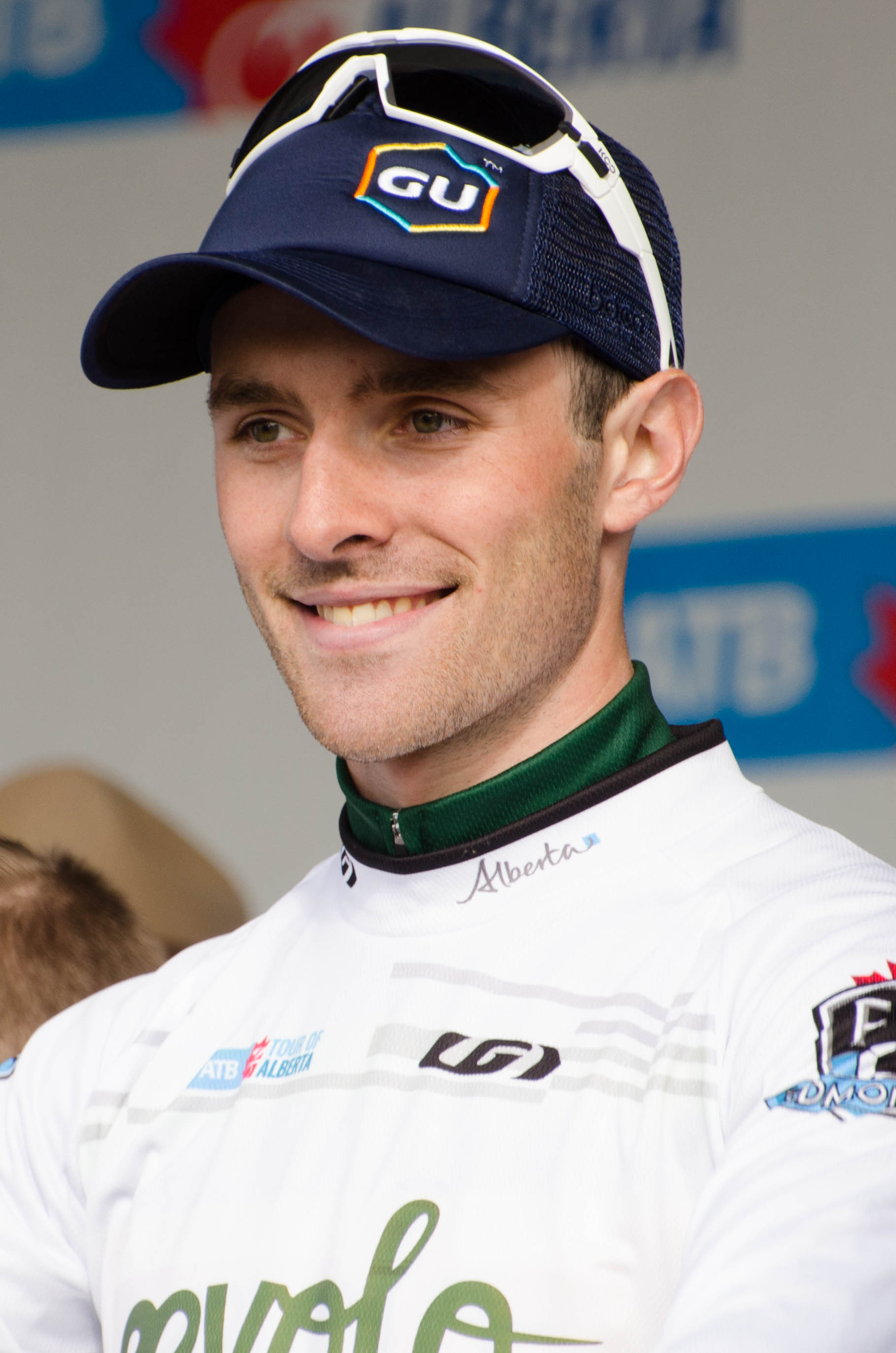
- Burke at the 2017 Tour of Alberta

Personal information
- Full name: Jack Burke
- Born: 12 June 1995 (age 31) Toronto, Ontario, Canada
- Height: 5 ft 11 in (1.80 m)
- Weight: 69 kg (152 lb; 10.9 st)

Cycling career
- Sport: Cycling
- Current team: Scott Sports
- Discipline: Road
- Role: Rider
- Rider type: General Classification

Amateur teams
- 2011–2015: NCCH–Dec Express
- 2023–: Arbo Headstart on Fahrrad

Professional teams
- 2016: H&R Block Pro Cycling
- 2017: Aevolo
- 2018: Jelly Belly–Maxxis
- 2019: Leopard Pro Cycling
- 2020: Team Vorarlberg Santic
- 2021: Union Raiffeisen Radteam Tirol
- 2022: Team Felbermayr–Simplon Wels

Jack Burke (born 12 June 1995) is a Canadian bicycle racer, ski mountaineer, author, and podcaster. He has been without a regular team since 2022, riding as an amateur but with support of sponsors.

== Biography ==
After some victories as a junior, including a stage, and fourth overall at the 2013 Tour de l'Abitibi, Burke's career was disrupted by a positive drug test. The result of this was overturned in 2014 with Burke cleared of all wrongdoing.

Burke returned to cycling and competed with some success on various UCI Continental teams, including a stage win at the 2018 Tour de Beauce. In late 2022, Burke was hit by a car while training and sustained a broken back, bleeding on his brain and permanent scarring to his face. To help pay for his medical bills he started to write a training guide which turned into his first book How To Become A Pro Cyclist, which Burke subsequently developed into a podcast.

As well as traditional road racing, Burke has competed in other disciplines. He has twice won the Ötztal Cycling Marathon, and competed in a 2024 event in the ski mountaineering World Cup in Cortina, having used the sport for winter training.

In 2024, Burke gained headlines for breaking Strava "King of the Mountain" times on prominent cycling climbs including the Mortirolo, the Stelvio, and L'Alpe d'Huez.

== Major results ==
2013
2nd Time trial, National Junior Road Championships
4th Overall Tour de l'Abitibi

1st Stage 3

2016
2nd Time trial, National Under-23 Road Championships
2017
4th Overall Tour de Beauce
6th Overall Tour of Alberta

1st Young rider classification

6th Overall Grand Prix Cycliste de Saguenay

1st Young rider classification

9th Overall Joe Martin Stage Race
2018
4th Overall Tour de Beauce
10th Overall Tour of the Gila
1st Mt Megantic Stage Tour de Beauce
2019
4th Overall Tour du Jura Cycliste
5th Time trial, National Road Championships
2022
6th Overall Oberösterreich Rundfahrt
1st Ötztaler Rad Marathon
2024
1st Overall Ötztaler Radmarathon
1st Kühtai Bergkaiser
3rd Race Across The Alps
