= Union Raiffeisen Radteam Tirol =

Austrian cycling team

Team information
- UCI code: URT
- Registered: Austria
- Founded: 2001
- Discipline: Road
- Status: Club (2001–2020); UCI Continental (2021–)
- Bicycles: Giant

Key personnel
- General manager: Roland Baumann
- Team managers: Gregor Pavlic; Daniel Knapp; Michael Sprenger

Team name history
- 2001 2002–: Raiffeisen Radteam Tirol; Union Raiffeisen Radteam Tirol

Union Raiffeisen Radteam Tirol is an Austrian road cycling team founded in 2001. Prior to 2021, the team held club status, before upgrading to UCI Continental.

== Team roster ==
As of 14 August 2021.

Rider	Date of birth
Jasper Albrecht (AUS)	16 February 1999 (age 27)
Jack Burke (CAN)	12 June 1995 (age 31)
Fabian Costa (AUT)	8 October 1994 (age 31)
Mario Gamper (AUT)	3 August 1999 (age 27)
Philip Handl (AUT)	26 November 1996 (age 29)
Johannes Hirschbichler (AUT)	27 February 1993 (age 33)
Alexander Kreidl (AUT)	25 June 1997 (age 29)
Bernhard Lube (AUT)	22 August 2002 (age 24)

Rider	Date of birth
Gorazd Per (SLO)	5 March 1997 (age 29)
Daniel Reiter (AUT)	13 July 1991 (age 35)
Jakob Reiter (AUT)	12 May 2000 (age 26)
Nepomuk Roth (GER)	29 December 2000 (age 25)
Gregor Stadlbauer (AUT)	20 January 2001 (age 25)
Fabian Steininger (AUT)	12 September 2000 (age 25)
Florian Vesely (AUT)	4 October 2002 (age 23)
Lucas Zauchner (AUT)	29 January 2002 (age 24)
