= Maxim Rusnac =

Moldovan cyclist

Personal information
- Born: 29 September 1992 (age 34) Bălți, Moldova

Cycling career
- Sport: Cycling
- Discipline: Road
- Role: Rider

Amateur teams
- 2012: World Cycling Centre
- 2013: GS Banca Popolare Emilia-Romagna
- 2014: General Store Bottoli Zardini
- 2015–2016: Gragnano Sporting Club

Professional team
- 2017–2018: Differdange–Losch

Maxim Rusnac (born 29 September 1992 in Bălți) is a Moldovan cyclist, who last rode for UCI Continental team Differdange–Losch.

== Major results ==
2011
7th Road race, National Road Championships
2012
National Road Championships

4th Time trial
5th Road race

2013
2nd Time trial, National Under-23 Road Championships
9th Trofeo Città di San Vendemiano
2014
National Road Championships

6th Road race
7th Time trial

2015
National Road Championships

1st Road race
1st Time trial

2016
National Road Championships

1st Time trial
2nd Road race

5th Trofeo Edil C
2017
National Road Championships

2nd Time trial
2nd Road race

5th Overall Tour of Szeklerland

1st Mountains classification

10th Overall Sibiu Cycling Tour
2018
National Road Championships

1st Road race
3rd Time trial
