= Ruslan Ivanov =

Moldovan cyclist

Personal information
- Full name: Ruslan Ivanov
- Born: 18 December 1973 (age 52) Chişinău, Moldovan SSR, Soviet Union

Cycling career
- Sport: Cycling
- Discipline: Road
- Role: Rider

Professional teams
- 1998–1999: Brescialat-Liquigas
- 2000: Amica Chips-Tassoni Sport
- 2001–2004: Alessio
- 2005: Domina Vacanze
- 2007: Amore & Vita-McDonald's
- 2008: Serramenti PVC Diquigiovanni

Ruslan Ivanov (born 18 December 1973 in Chişinău) is a former Moldovan road bicycle racer.

Ivanov competed in two Olympics Games - in the individual time trial and the individual road race at the 1996 Summer Olympics, and at the individual road race at the 2004 Summer Olympics.

== Palmares ==
1997
National Road Championships

1st Time trial
1st Road race

1st Coppa Collecchio
2nd, Overall, Baby Giro
1998
National Road Championships

1st Time trial
1st Road race

1st, GP d'Europe (with Massimo Cigana)
2000
1st Road race, National Road Championships
1st, Giro di Toscana
2001
1st, Overall, Settimana Internazionale di Coppi e Bartali

Winner Stages 2 & 3

1st, Stage 2, Giro del Trentino
2nd, Overall, Regio-Tour

Winner Stage 2b

National Road Championships

2nd Time trial
3rd Road race

10th, Tirreno–Adriatico
2002
1st, GP Lugano
1st, Stage 5, Settimana Internazionale di Coppi e Bartali
1st, Stage 4, Settimana Lombarda
5th, Tirreno–Adriatico
2003
1st, Stage 5, Vuelta a Andalucía
1st, Stage 5, Settimana Internazionale di Coppi e Bartali
1st, Stage 2, Giro d'Abruzzo
1st, Stage 3, Brixia Tour
2008
1st, Tour de Langkawi
