= Igor Pugaci =

Moldovan cyclist

Personal information
- Full name: Igor Pugaci
- Born: 5 January 1975 (age 51) Dubăsari, Moldavian SSR, Soviet Union

Cycling career
- Sport: Cycling
- Discipline: Road
- Role: Rider

Professional teams
- 1999-2003: Saeco–Cannondale
- 2004: De Nardi–Piemme Telekom
- 2005: Universal Caffé-Styloffice
- 2007: Diquigiovanni–Selle Italia

Igor Pugaci (born 5 January 1975 in Dubăsari) is a retired Moldovan road bicycle racer.

== Major results ==
1998
1st, Overall, Giro della Valle d'Aosta (U23)

1999
National Road Championships

1st Time trial
1st Road race

2000
1st Time trial, National Road Championships

2001
1st Time trial, National Road Championships

2006
1st, Stage 3, Tour of Turkey
