= Oleg Berdos =

Moldovan and Romanian road bicycle racer

Personal information
- Full name: Oleg Berdos
- Born: 9 June 1987 (age 39): Chișinău, Moldavian SSR, Soviet Union; (now Moldova)

Cycling career
- Sport: Cycling
- Current team: Retired
- Disciplines: Road; Track
- Role: Rider

Amateur team
- 2008–2009: Brisot Cardin Bibanese

Professional teams
- 2010–2012: De Rosa–Stac Plastic
- 2013–2014: Tuşnad Cycling Team

Oleg Berdos (born 9 June 1987 in Chișinău) is a Moldovan-Romanian former road bicycle racer, who rode professionally between 2010 and 2014 for the Utensilnord–Named and Tuşnad Cycling Team teams.

== Major results ==
2007
National Road Championships

1st Road race
2nd Time trial

2nd Trofeo Città di San Vendemiano
2008
1st Stage 3 Giro del Friuli-Venezia Giulia
3rd Road race, National Road Championships
3rd GP Industria del Cuoio e delle Pelli
4th Trofeo Città di San Vendemiano
4th GP Città di Felino
9th Road race, UEC European Under-23 Road Championships
2009
National Road Championships

1st Road race
3rd Time trial

4th Memorial Mattia Rosa
6th Trofeo Avis
6th Giro del Belvedere
8th GP Città di Felino
2010
8th Giro del Veneto
2011
2nd Road race, National Road Championships
5th Memorial Marco Pantani
2013
1st Mountains classification Tour of Szeklerland
5th Overall Tour of Romania
2014
1st Romanian rider classification Sibiu Cycling Tour
3rd Overall Tour of Szeklerland

1st Points classification

8th GP Hungary
9th Central European Tour Szerencs–Ibrány
