= Moldovan National Road Race Championships =

Race championship

Moldovan National Road Race Championships – Men's elite race
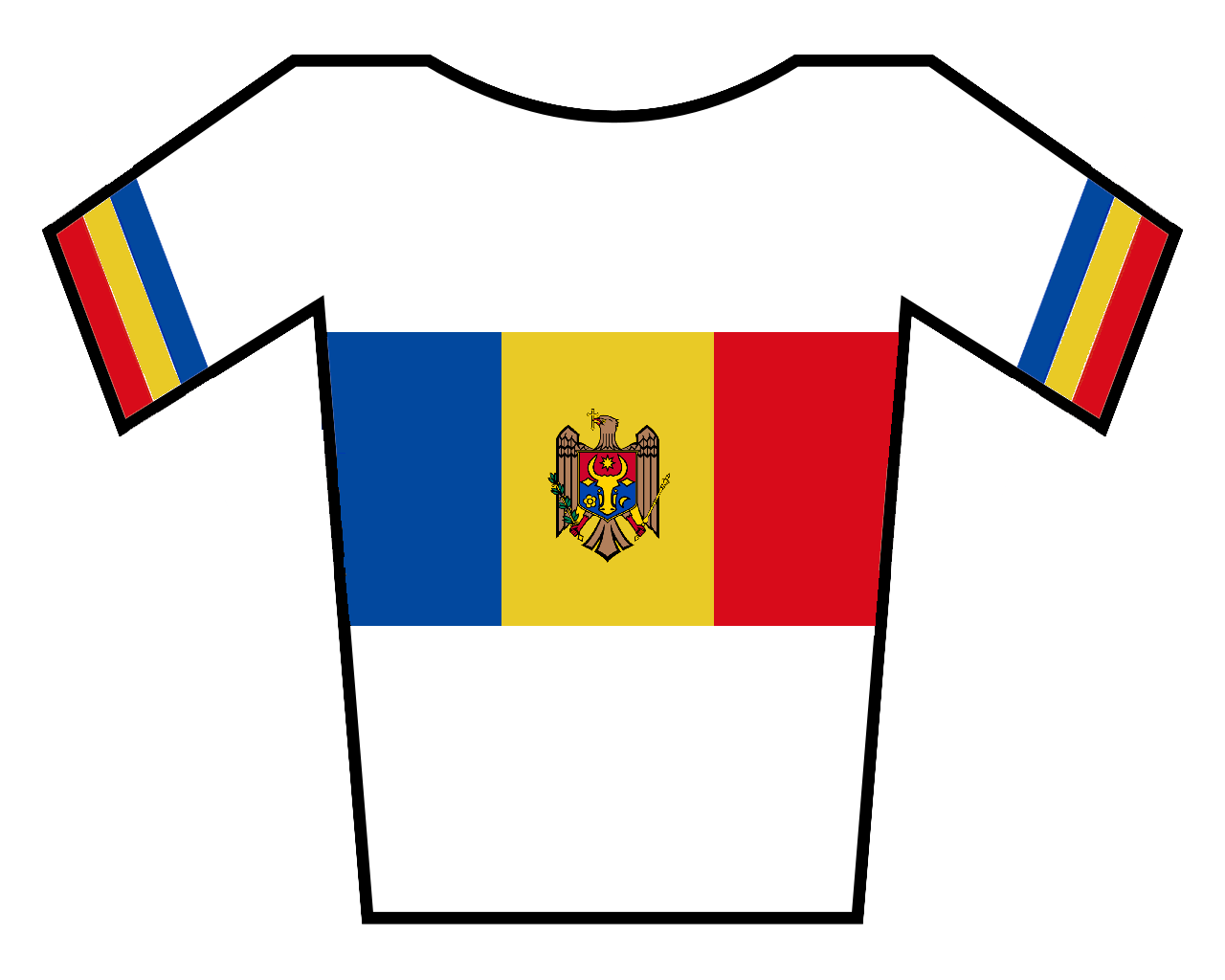

Race details
- Region: Moldova
- Local name: Campionatul Republicii Moldova la ciclism șosea - Cursa la linie Cursa contratimp
- Discipline: Road bicycle racing
- Type: One-day
- Organiser: Moldavian Cycling Federation

History
- First edition: 1997
- Editions: 25 (as of 2026)
- First winner: Ruslan Ivanov
- Most wins: Alexandre Pliușchin (4 wins)
- Most recent: Andrei Sobennicov

Cristian Raileanu as a National Road Champion (2020)

The Moldovan National Road Race Championships have been held since 1997.

The winners of each event are awarded with a symbolic cycling jersey featuring red, yellow and blue, the colors of the national flag, which can be worn by the rider at other road race events to show their status as national champion. The champion's stripes can be combined into a sponsored rider's team kit design for this purpose.

== Multiple winners ==
Wins	Rider	Years
4	Alexandre Pliușchin	2008, 2010, 2011, 2012
3	Cristian Raileanu	2016, 2019, 2020
3	Ruslan Ivanov	1997, 1998, 2000
3	Andrei Sobennicov	2021, 2022, 2024
2	Oleg Berdos	2007, 2009
2	Maxim Rusnac	2015, 2018

== Men ==
Year	Gold	Silver	Bronze
1997	Ruslan Ivanov	Igor Bonciucov	Igor Pugaci
1998	Ruslan Ivanov	Igor Bonciucov	Alexei Nazarenco
1999	Igor Pugaci	Dmitri Ciudacov	Artiom Saraev
2000	Ruslan Ivanov	Igor Pugaci	Igor Bonciucov
2001	Igor Bonciucov	Igor Pugaci	Ruslan Ivanov
2002– 2006	Not held		
2007	Oleg Berdos	Sergiu Catan	Alexandr Braico
2008	Alexandre Pliușchin	Sergiu Cioban	Oleg Berdos
2009	Oleg Berdos	Alexandr Braico	Sergiu Catan
2010	Alexandre Pliușchin	Alexandr Braico	Serghei Țvetcov
2011	Alexandre Pliușchin	Oleg Berdos	Sergiu Cioban
2012	Alexandre Pliușchin	Sergiu Cioban	Alexandr Braico
2013	Alexandr Braico	Sergiu Cioban	Veaceslav Verciuc
2014	Sergiu Cioban	Alexandr Braico	Cristian Raileanu
2015	Maxim Rusnac	Cristian Raileanu	Nichita Lunin
2016	Cristian Raileanu	Maxim Rusnac	Oleg Bimbaș
2017	Nicolae Tanovițchii	Maxim Rusnac	Cristian Raileanu
2018	Maxim Rusnac	Nicolae Tanovițchii	Cristian Raileanu
2019	Cristian Raileanu	Vladislav Korotaș	Andrei Vrabii
2020	Cristian Raileanu	Andrei Sobennicov	Andrei Covaliciuc
2021	Andrei Sobennicov	Cristian Raileanu	Andrei Vrabii
2022	Andrei Sobennicov	Laurențiu Buianu	Arman Garibian
2023	Laurențiu Buianu	Andrei Vrabii	Semion Culicenco
2024	Andrei Sobennicov	Laurențiu Buianu	Daniel Babanschi
2025	Ilie Șeremet	Andrei Sobennicov	Laurențiu Buianu
2026	Ilie Șeremet	Dumitru Zagoreanu	Ghennadii Morgun

== See also ==
- Moldovan National Time Trial Championships
- National road cycling championships
