= Andrei Sobennicov =

Moldovan cyclist

Personal information
- Full name: Andrei Sobennicov
- Born: 1 April 1988 (age 38) Chișinău, Moldova

Cycling career
- Sport: Cycling
- Current team: CSUVT–Devron West Cycling Team
- Discipline: Road
- Role: Rider

Amateur teams
- 2016: Lizarran Reus–8 Restaurant
- 2021: Chișinău
- 2021–: CSUVT–Devron West Cycling Team

Major wins
- One-day races and Classics National Road Race Championships (2021, 2022, 2024)

Andrei Sobennicov (born 1 April 1988) is a Moldovan cyclist, who currently rides for amateur team CSUVT–Devron West Cycling Team.

== Major results ==
2016
4th Road race, National Road Championships
2019
3rd Road race, National Road Championships
2020
3rd Road race, National Road Championships
2021
National Road Championships

1st Road race
4th Time trial

2022
National Road Championships

1st Road race
2nd Time trial

2024
National Road Championships

1st Road race
