= Miguel Heidemann =

German cyclist

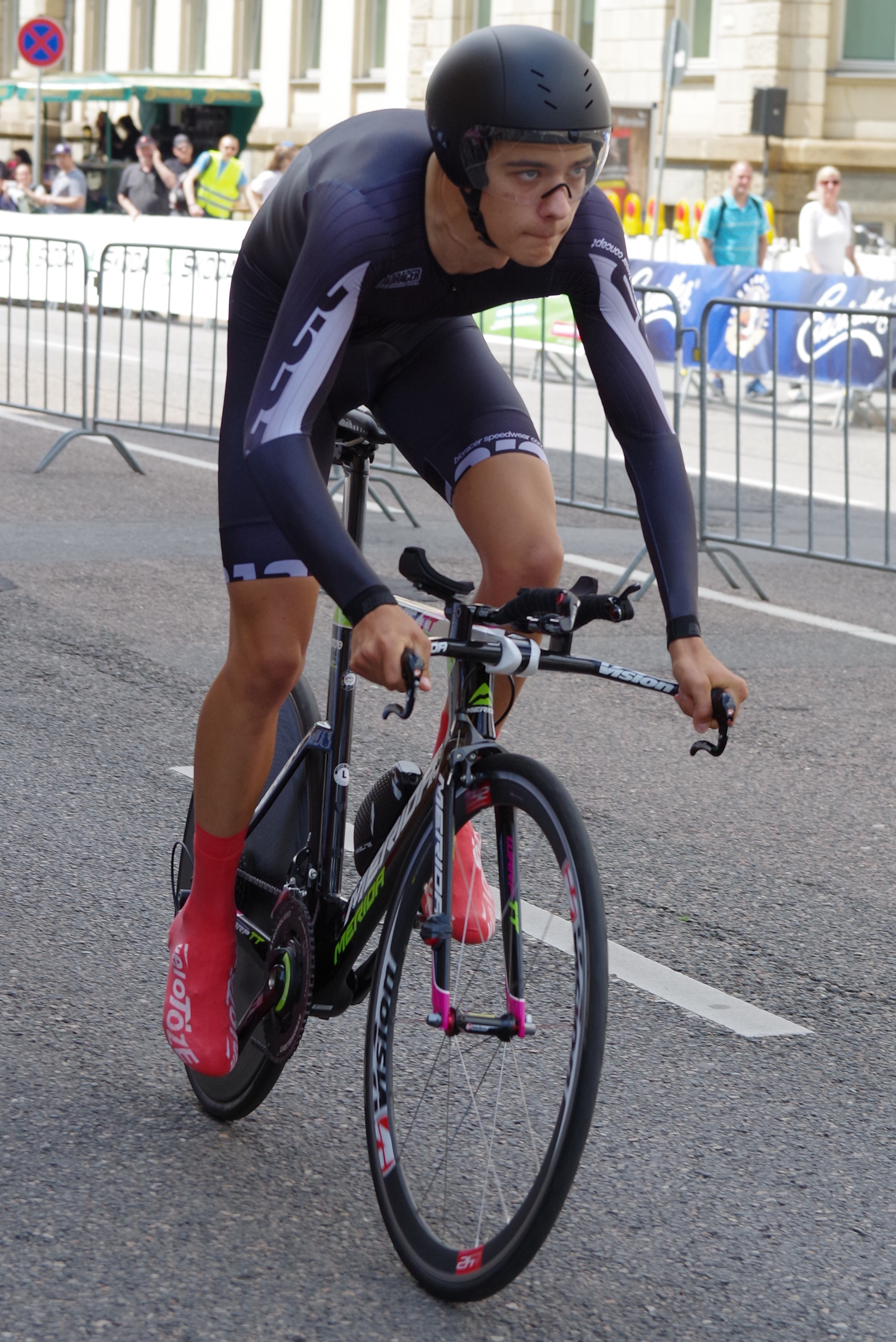
- Heidemann in 2017

Personal information
- Born: 27 January 1998 (age 28) Trier, Germany
- Height: 1.87 m (6 ft 2 in)

Cycling career
- Sport: Cycling
- Current team: Team Felt–Felbermayr
- Discipline: Road
- Role: Rider
- Rider type: Time trialist

Amateur teams
- 2011–2016: RV Schwalbe Trier
- 2015–2016: Team Wheelsports–RV Queidersbach–LV Rheinland-Pfalz
- 2017: RV Sossenheim
- 2017: Opelit–Fachklinik Dr. Herzog
- 2018: Herrmann Radteam

Professional teams
- 2019: Herrmann Radteam
- 2020–2021: Leopard Pro Cycling
- 2022: B&B Hotels–KTM
- 2023: Leopard TOGT Pro Cycling
- 2024–: Team Felt–Felbermayr
Medal record
Men's road bicycle racing
Representing Germany
World Championships
Silver medal – second place	2024 Zurich	Mixed team relay
Bronze medal – third place	2023 Glasgow	Mixed team relay
European Championships
Gold medal – first place	2020 Plouay	Mixed team relay
Silver medal – second place	2021 Trentino	Mixed team relay
Bronze medal – third place	2023 Drenthe	Mixed team relay

Miguel Heidemann (born 27 January 1998) is a German professional racing cyclist, who currently rides for UCI Continental team Team Felt–Felbermayr. He won a gold medal in the mixed team relay event at the 2020 European Road Championships.

== Major results ==
2019
1st Time trial, National Under-23 Road Championships
1st Mountains classification, Istrian Spring Trophy
10th G.P. Palio del Recioto
2020
1st Team relay, UEC European Road Championships
1st Time trial, National Under-23 Road Championships
10th Overall Tour of Antalya
2021
2nd Team relay, UEC European Road Championships
2nd Time trial, National Road Championships
9th Overall Istrian Spring Trophy
10th Chrono des Nations
2023
2nd Time trial, National Road Championships
3rd Team relay, UCI Road World Championships
3rd Team relay, UEC European Road Championships
5th Grand Prix de la Somme
8th Grand Prix de la ville de Pérenchies
9th Tour du Jura
2024
2nd Team relay, UCI Road World Championships
2nd Overall Tour of Sharjah
3rd Time trial, National Road Championships
2025
2nd Time trial, National Road Championships
