= MLP Team Bergstraße =

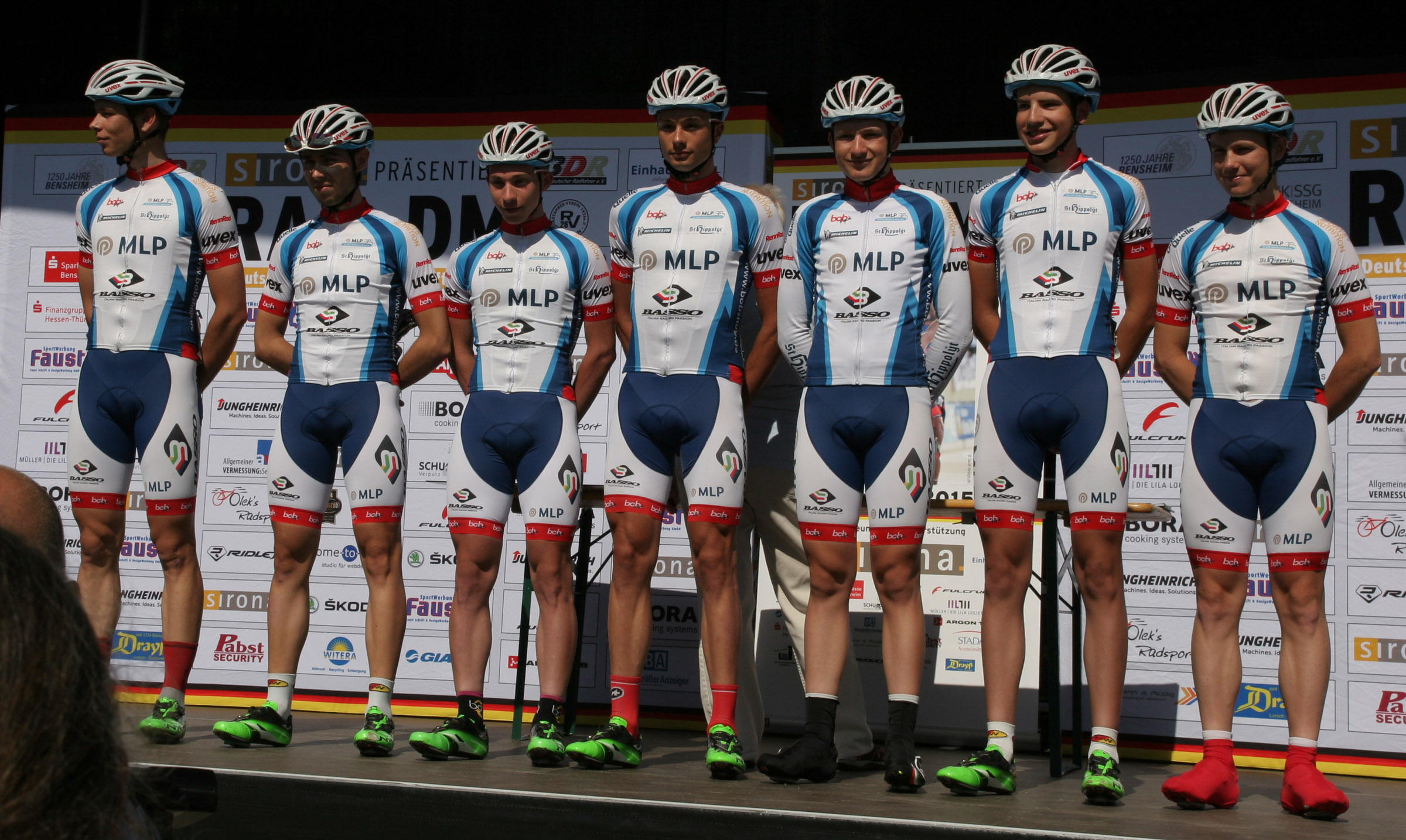

Team information
- UCI code: TBJ
- Registered: Germany
- Founded: 2013
- Disbanded: 2015
- Discipline: Road
- Status: UCI Continental
- Bicycles: Basso

Key personnel
- General manager: Danilo Carocci
- Team managers: Mark Siebigteroth; Steffen Höbich; Sven Krauß

Team name history
- 2013 2014–2015: Team Bergstraße–Jenatec; MLP Team Bergstraße

MLP Team Bergstraße was a German UCI Continental cycling team that existed from 2013 until 2015.
