= Igor Bonciucov =

Moldovan cyclist (born 1973)

Personal information
- Born: 16 March 1973 (age 53) Dubăsari, Moldovan SSR, Soviet Union

Cycling career
- Sport: Cycling
- Current team: Retired
- Discipline: Road
- Role: Rider

Professional teams
- 1986: Roslotto–ZG Mobili
- 2001: Atlas–Ambra
- 2003: Miche

Igor Bonciucov (born 16 March 1973) in Dubăsari, Transnistria, Moldovan SSR. Bonciucov has served as a professional cyclist in three non consecutive years.

He competed in the men's individual road race at the 1996 Summer Olympics. In 2001, he won the Moldovan National Road Race.

== Major achievements ==
1998
Tour of Romania, overall winner
2001
1st Road race, National Road Championships
