= Christopher Hatz =

German cyclist (born 1991)

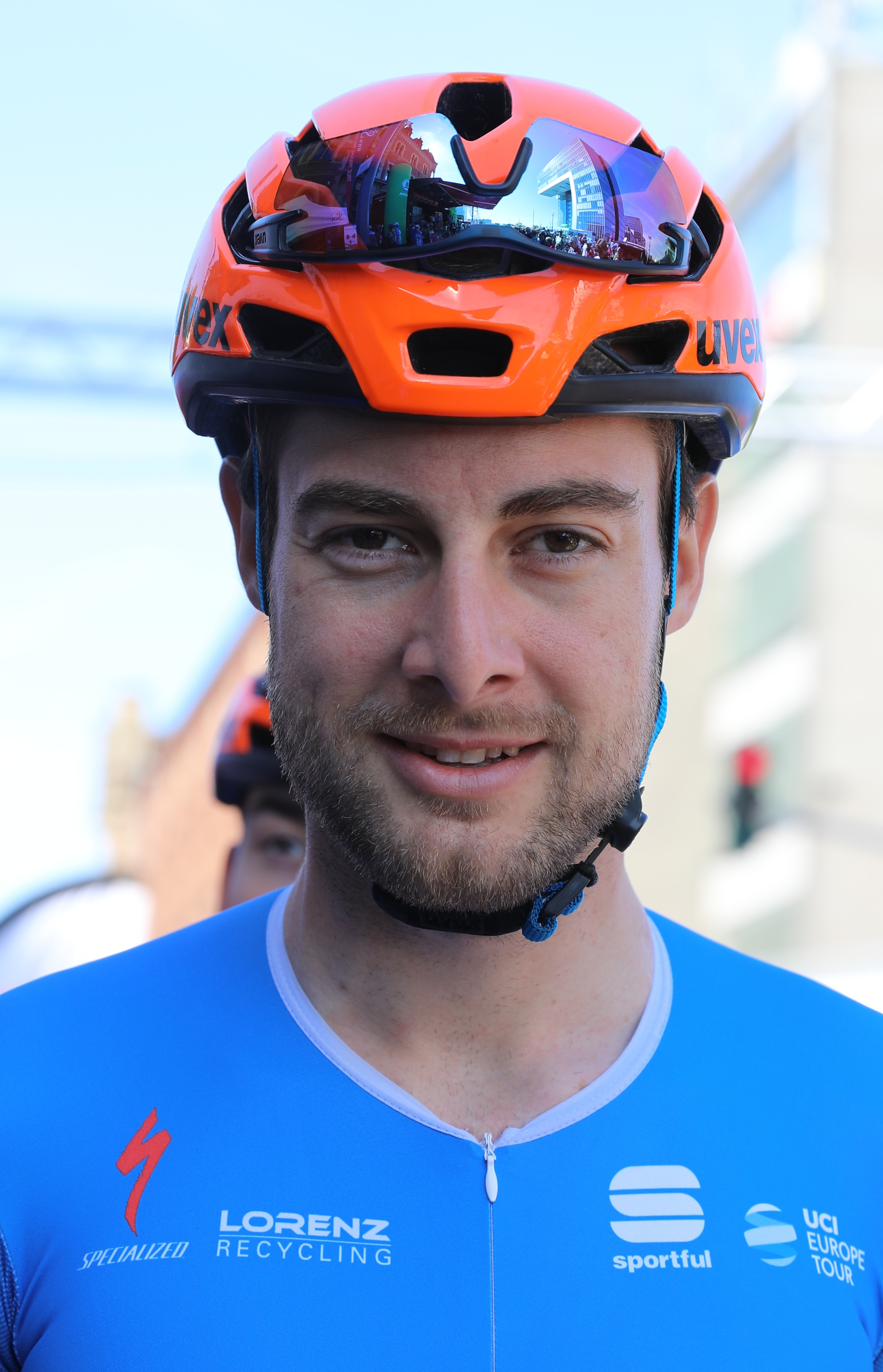
- Hatz at the 2019 Rund um Köln

Personal information
- Full name: Christopher Hatz
- Born: 21 October 1991 (age 34) Achern, Germany

Cycling career
- Sport: Cycling
- Current team: 54x11; Radsport-Team Lutz
- Disciplines: Road; Cyclo-cross
- Role: Rider

Amateur teams
- 2006–2009: TV Oppenheim 1846
- 2008: Team Speedweapon
- 2009: Juniorenteam Rheinhessen
- 2010: Rothaus
- 2010–2012: Radsport-Team Lutz
- 2011–2012: Team Bergstrasse
- 2018: Herrmann Radteam
- 2021–: 54x11
- 2021–: Radsport-Team Lutz

Professional teams
- 2013–2014: Team Bergstraße–Jenatec
- 2015–2017: Team Kuota–Lotto
- 2019: Herrmann Radteam
- 2020: Hrinkow Advarics Cycleang

Christopher Hatz (born 21 October 1991) is a German racing cyclist, who rides for German amateur teams 54x11 and Radsport-Team Lutz.

== Major results ==
2013
8th Eschborn–Frankfurt Under-23
2014
1st Overall Bałtyk–Karkonosze Tour
2015
6th Overall Course de Solidarność et des Champions Olympiques
2016
8th Grand Prix de la Somme
2017
3rd Rund um Düren
2018
5th White Spot / Delta Road Race
2019
4th Poreč Trophy
7th Overall Tour of Mersin
8th Overall Belgrade–Banja Luka
10th Time trial, European Games
