= Herrmann Radteam =

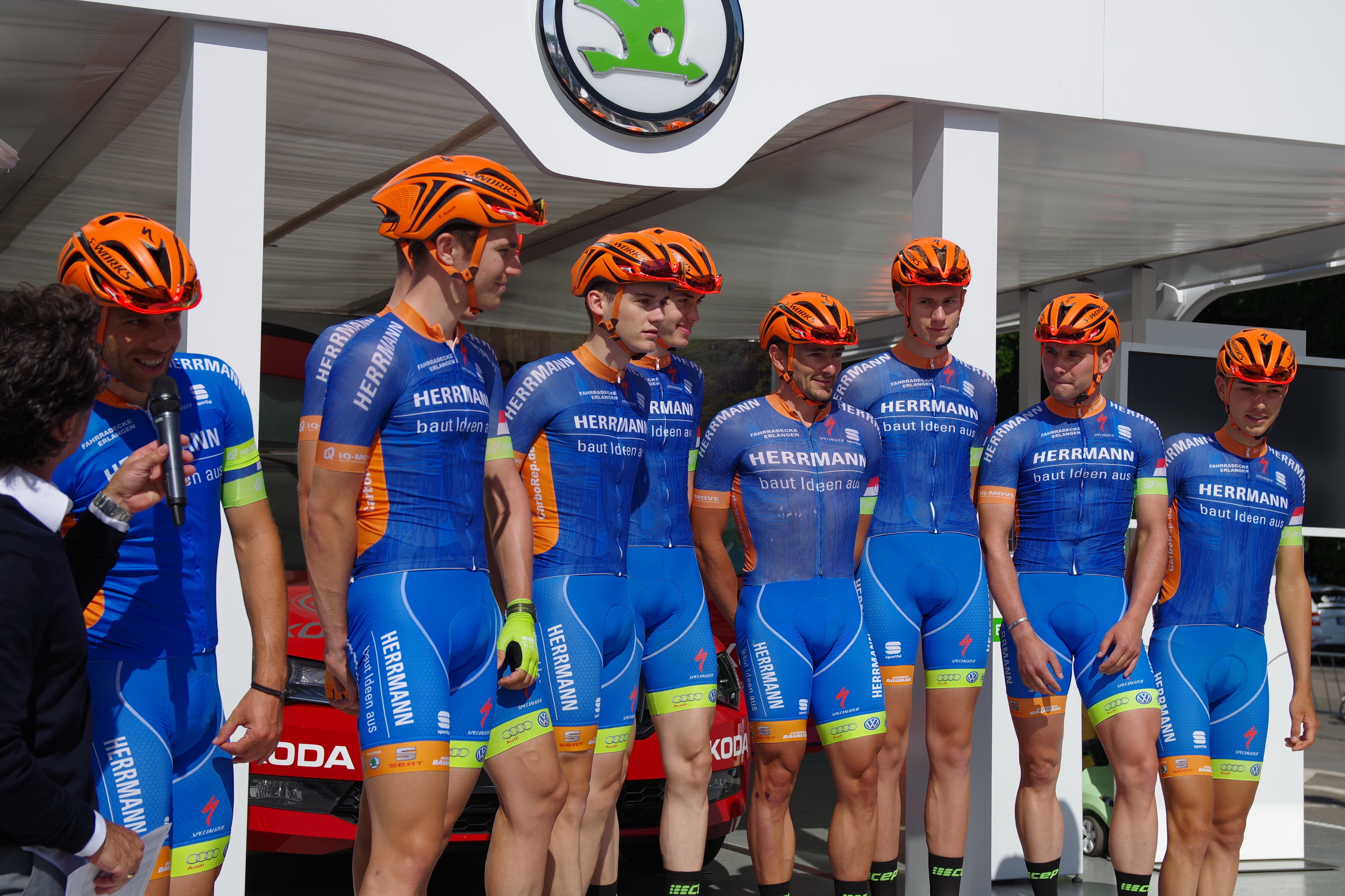

Team information
- UCI code: HRR
- Registered: Germany
- Founded: 2019
- Status: UCI Continental (2019–)

Team name history
- 2019–: Radteam Herrmann

The Herrmann Radteam is a German UCI Continental road bicycle racing team. The team registered with the UCI in 2019.

== Team roster ==
Rider	Date of birth
Johannes Adamietz (GER)	24 May 1998 (age 28)
Lukas Baldinger (GER)	31 January 1999 (age 27)
Stefan Brandlmeier (GER)	7 January 1993 (age 33)
Victor Brück (GER)	4 July 1996 (age 30)
Leon Echtermann (GER)	19 June 1997 (age 29)
Christopher Hatz (GER)	21 October 1991 (age 34)
Miguel Heidemann (GER)	27 January 1998 (age 28)

Rider	Date of birth
Lennart Jung (GER)	3 April 2000 (age 26)
Florenz Knauer (GER)	8 January 1989 (age 37)
Florian Obersteiner (GER)	11 October 1995 (age 30)
Caiden Plummer (USA)	16 February 1999 (age 27)
Manuel Porzner (GER)	11 October 1996 (age 29)
Alexander Tarlton (GER)	6 October 2000 (age 25)
Nils Weispfennig (GER)	24 April 2000 (age 26)

== National Champions ==
2019
Germany Under-23 Time Trial, Miguel Heidemann
