= Florian Gamper =

Austrian cyclist (born 1999)

Personal information
- Full name: Florian Gamper
- Born: 3 August 1999 (age 27)

Cycling career
- Sport: Cycling
- Current team: Tirol KTM Cycling Team
- Discipline: Road
- Role: Rider

Professional team
- 2018–: Tirol Cycling Team

Florian Gamper (born 3 August 1999) is an Austrian racing cyclist, who currently rides for UCI Continental team Tirol KTM Cycling Team. He rode for the Tirol Cycling Team in the men's team time trial event at the 2018 UCI Road World Championships.

His brothers Mario Gamper and Patrick Gamper are also professional cyclists.

== Major results ==
2019
10th Croatia–Slovenia
