= Cristian Raileanu =

Moldovan-Romanian cyclist

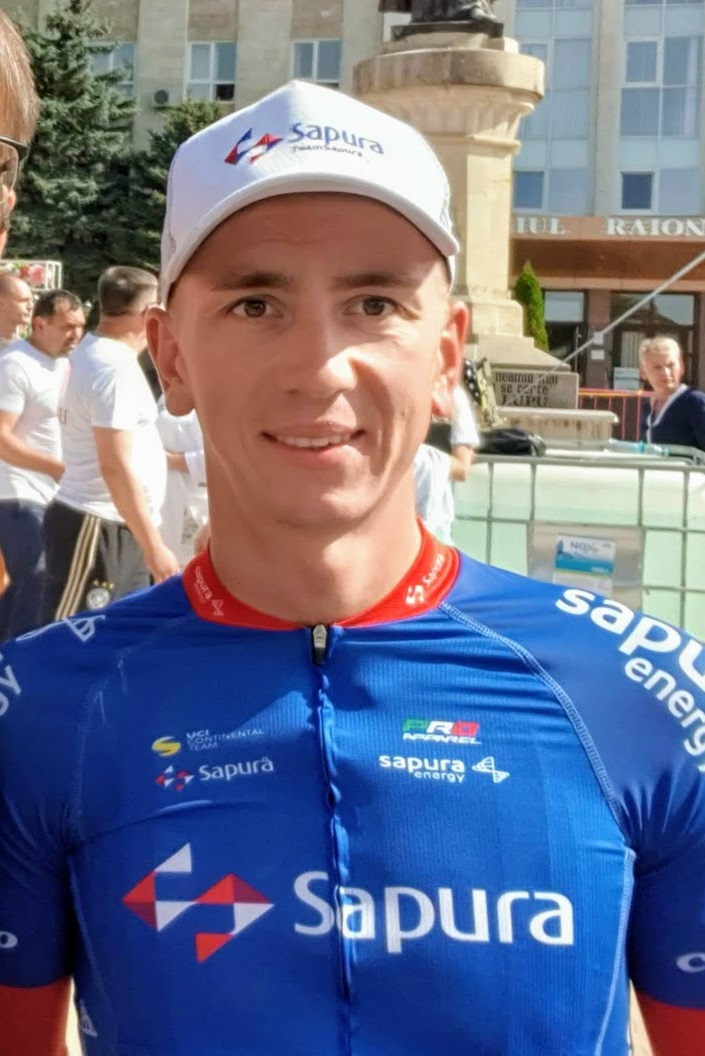
- Raileanu at the 2020 Moldovan National Road Race Championships

Personal information
- Full name: Cristian Raileanu
- Born: 24 January 1993 (age 33) Bălți, Moldova
- Height: 1.76 m (5 ft 9 in)
- Weight: 63 kg (139 lb)

Cycling career
- Sport: Cycling
- Current team: Li-Ning Star
- Disciplines: Road; Mountain biking
- Role: Rider

Amateur teams
- 2012–2016: Bibanese Gaiaplast Cardin
- 2023: CSA Steaua Bucuresti

Professional teams
- 2016: Wilier Triestina–Southeast (stagiaire)
- 2017: Differdange–Losch
- 2018: Torku Şekerspor
- 2019–2021: Team Sapura Cycling
- 2022: Sakarya BB Pro Team
- 2023: Hengxiang Cycling Team
- 2024–: Li-Ning Star

Major wins
- One-day races and Classics Moldovan National Time Trial Championships (2019–2021) Moldovan National Road Race Championships (2016, 2019, 2020) Romanian National Road Race Championships (2024,2026) Romanian National Time Trial Championships (2026)

Cristian Raileanu (born 24 January 1993) is a Moldovan-born Romanian cyclist, who rides for UCI Continental team Li-Ning Star. He represented Moldova until 2022.

== Major results ==
2012
8th Giro del Belvedere
2013
3rd Time trial, Moldovan National Under-23 Road Championships
2014
Moldovan National Road Championships

2nd Time trial
3rd Road race

5th Trofeo Città di San Vendemiano
9th GP Bianco di Custoza
2015
Moldovan National Road Championships

1st Under-23 road race
2nd Road race
3rd Time trial

3rd Ruota d'Oro
9th Trofeo Internazionale Bastianelli
2016
1st Road race, Moldovan National Road Championships
2nd Coppa Città di San Daniele
7th Giro del Medio Brenta
2017
3rd Road race, Moldovan National Road Championships
4th Overall Tour of Bihor-Bellotto
4th Overall Tour of Szeklerland

1st Stage 3a (ITT)

4th Antwerpse Havenpijl
6th Overall Sibiu Cycling Tour
7th Overall Tour de Hongrie
8th Tour du Jura
2018
1st Overall Tour of Cartier

1st Stage 2

1st Mountains classification, Tour of Romania
2nd Overall Tour of Antalya
2nd Overall Tour of Mesopotamia
3rd Road race, Moldovan National Road Championships
3rd Overall Tour de Serbie
4th Grand Prix Side
5th Overall Tour of Bihor-Bellotto
7th Overall Tour of Mevlana
8th Grand Prix Alanya
9th Overall Tour of Mersin
2019
Moldovan National Road Championships

1st Time trial
1st Road race

1st Stage 4 Tour of Taiyuan
2nd Overall Tour of Iran (Azerbaijan)
2nd Overall Tour de Singkarak

1st Stage 4

3rd Overall Tour de Iskandar Johor

1st Stage 2

4th Overall Tour of Peninsular

1st Stage 5

5th Overall Tour de Indonesia
10th Overall Tour de Taiwan
2020
Moldovan National Road Championships

1st Time trial
1st Road race

1st Cross-country, Moldovan National Mountain Bike Championships
5th Malaysian International Classic Race
7th Overall Tour de Langkawi
2021
Moldovan National Road Championships

1st Time trial
2nd Road race

1st Cross-country, Moldovan National Mountain Bike Championships
2022
2nd Overall Tour of Romania
2nd Overall Tour of Albania
Romanian National Road Championships

3rd Time trial
5th Road race

8th Overall Tour of Szeklerland

1st Stage 4

9th Overall Tour of Sharjah
2023
2nd Overall Tour of Albania
3rd Overall Tour of Szeklerland

1st Stage 3

4th Overall Tour of Huangshan

1st Mountains classification

4th Overall Aziz Shusha
Romanian National Road Championships

5th Road race
5th Time trial

7th Overall Tour of Hainan
10th Overall Visit South Aegean Islands
2024
Romanian National Road Championships

1st Road race
2nd Time trial

1st Overall Turul Colinelor

1st Stage 1

3rd Overall Turul Romaniei
4th Overall Tour of Poyang Lake
5th Overall Tour of Hainan
5th Cupa Max Ausnit
6th Overall Tour of Bostonliq
9th Overall Tour of Taihu Lake
2025
1st Road race, Balkan Road Championships
1st Overall Tour Gateh D'Tranung

1st Stages 1 (TTT) & 4

2nd Time trial, Romanian National Road Championships
2nd Overall Tour of Hainan
2026
Romanian National Road Championships

1st Road race
1st Time trial

2nd Overall Tour of Romania
3rd Overall Tour of Bostonliq
4th Overall Tour of Albania
6th Overall Tour of Thailand
8th Overall Pune Grand Tour
9th Overall Tour de Gyeongnam
