= Arman Garibian =

Moldovan cyclist

Personal information
- Full name: Arman Garibian
- Born: 14 February 2000 (age 26) Chișinău, Moldova

Cycling career
- Sport: Cycling
- Current team: CSUVT–Devron West CT
- Discipline: Road
- Role: Rider

Amateur teams
- 2021–2022: Chișinău
- 2021–: CSUVT–Devron West CT

Major wins
- One-day races and Classics National Time Trial Championships (2022)

Arman Garibian (born 14 February 2000) is a Moldovan cyclist who rides for Moldovan amateur team CSUVT–Devron West CT.

== Major results ==
2018
2nd Time trial, National Junior Road Championships
2019
2nd Time trial, National Under-23 Road Championships
2021
National Road Championships

3rd Time trial
4th Road race

2022
National Road Championships

1st Time trial
3rd Road race

2023
National Road Championships

3rd Time trial
5th Road race

2024
2nd Time trial, National Under-23 Road Championships
