= Sergiu Cioban =

Moldovan cyclist

Personal information
- Born: 7 March 1988 (age 38) Chişinău, Moldova

Cycling career
- Sport: Cycling
- Current team: Retired
- Discipline: Road
- Role: Rider

Amateur team
- 2008–2009: World Cycling Centre

Professional team
- 2011–2013: Tuşnad Cycling Team

Sergiu Cioban (born 7 March 1988) is a Moldovan former professional road cyclist.

== Major results ==
2006
6th Overall Tour du Pays de Vaud
9th Time trial, UCI Junior Road World Championships
2007
6th Chrono Champenois
2008
National Road Championships

1st Time trial
2nd Road race

2009
8th Overall Grand Prix du Portugal
2010
National Road Championships

1st Time trial
3rd Road race

8th Overall Tour of Szeklerland
9th Overall Tour of Romania
2011
National Road Championships

1st Time trial
3rd Road race

6th Overall Tour of Szeklerland
2012
National Road Championships

1st Time trial
2nd Road race

4th Grand Prix Dobrich I
2013
National Road Championships

1st Time trial
2nd Road race

2nd Košice–Miskolc
4th Overall Romanian Cycling Tour
2014
National Road Championships

1st Time trial
1st Road race
