= Mario Gamper =

Austrian cyclist (born 1999)

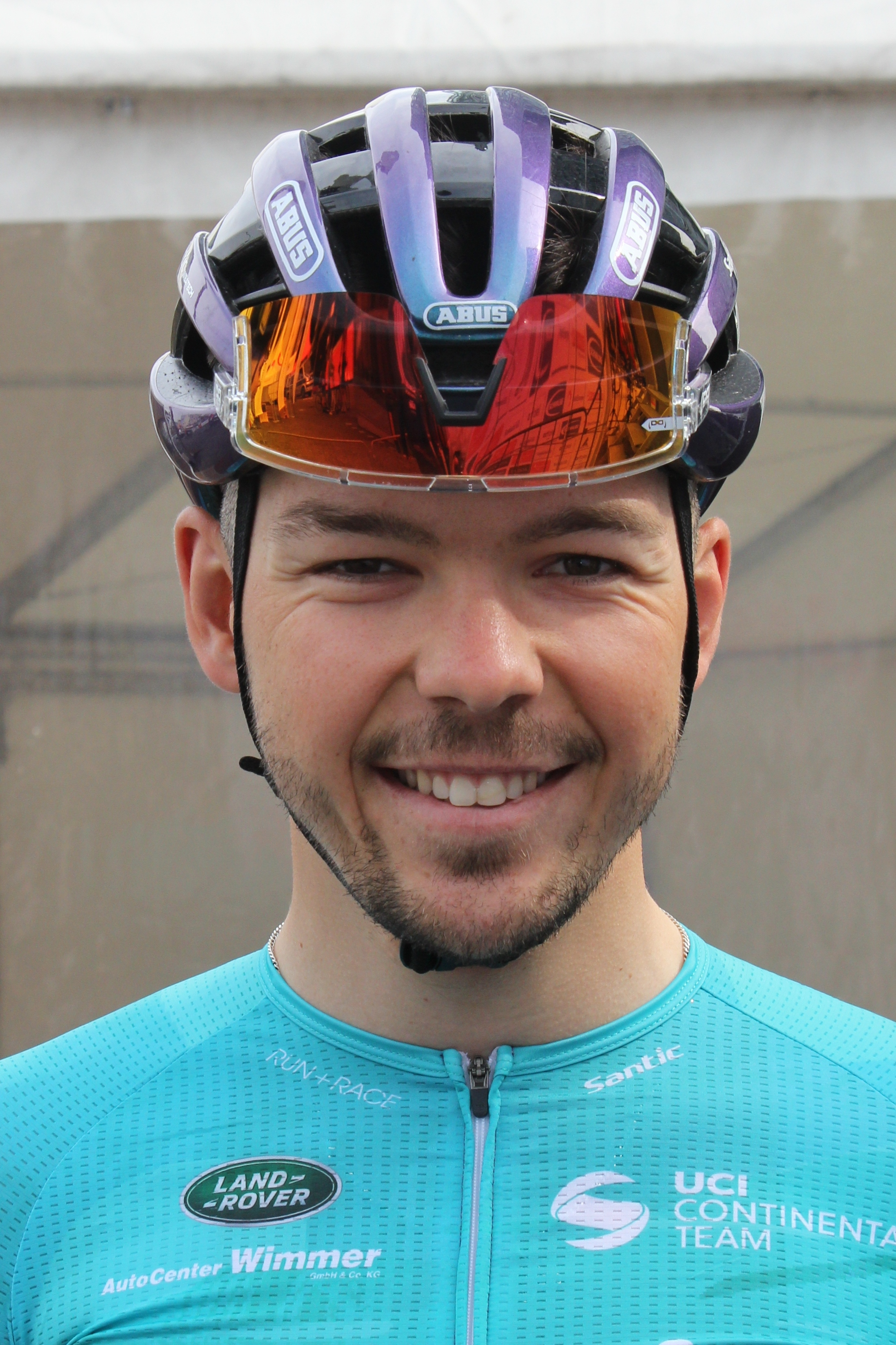

Personal information
- Full name: Mario Gamper
- Born: 3 August 1999 (age 27)

Cycling career
- Sport: Cycling
- Current team: Union Raiffeisen Radteam Tirol
- Discipline: Road
- Role: Rider

Professional teams
- 2018–2020: Tirol Cycling Team
- 2021–: Union Raiffeisen Radteam Tirol

Mario Gamper (born 3 August 1999) is an Austrian racing cyclist, who currently rides for UCI Continental team Union Raiffeisen Radteam Tirol. He rode for Tirol Cycling Team in the men's team time trial event at the 2018 UCI Road World Championships. His brothers Florian Gamper and Patrick Gamper are also professional cyclists.
