= Andrei Vrabii =

Moldovan cyclist (born 1992)

- Vrabii at 2026 Tour of Romania

Personal information
- Full name: Andrei Vrabii
- Born: 27 March 1992 (age 34) Chișinău, Moldova

Cycling career
- Sport: Cycling
- Discipline: Road
- Role: Rider

Amateur team
- 2021–2022: Chișinău

Andrei Vrabii (born 27 March 1992) is a Moldovan cyclist.

== Major results ==
2016
National Road Championships

2nd Time trial
5th Road race

2017
4th Time trial, National Road Championships
2018
National Road Championships

2nd Time trial
4th Road race

2019
National Road Championships

2nd Road race
2nd Time trial

2020
5th Time trial, National Road Championships
2021
2nd Time trial, National Road Championships
2022
3rd Time trial, National Road Championships
2023
National Road Championships

2nd Road race
2nd Time trial

2024
3rd Time trial, National Road Championships
