= Tuşnad Cycling Team =

Romanian cycling team

Tușnad Cycling Team
Team information
- UCI code: TCT
- Registered: Romania
- Founded: 2009
- Discipline: Road
- Status: UCI Continental

Team name history
- 2009–: Tuşnad Cycling Team

Tuşnad Cycling Team is a Romanian UCI Continental cycling team established in 2009.

== Team roster ==
Rider	Date of birth
Csaba Bartha (ROU)	23 April 1993 (age 33)
Leonid Krasnov (RUS)	24 January 1988 (age 38)
Péter László (ROU)	12 July 1998 (age 28)
Carol-Eduard Novak (ROU)	28 July 1976 (age 50)
Rubén Ramos (ARG)	2 November 1992 (age 33)

Rider	Date of birth
Laureano Rosas (ARG)	23 August 1990 (age 36)
Szabolcs Sebestyén (ROU)	23 March 1992 (age 34)
Norbert Szabó (ROU)	10 August 1993 (age 33)
Hugo Velázquez (ARG)	16 July 1992 (age 34)

== Major wins ==
2009
Stage 4 Tour of Szeklerland, Aurélien Passeron
2010
Stage 7 Tour of Romania, Andrea Pinos
2011
Moldova National Time Trial championships, Sergiu Cioban
2012
Overall Romanian Cycling Tour, Matija Kvasina

Stage 5, Matija Kvasina

Moldova National Time Trial championships, Sergiu Cioban
Central European Tour Miskolc GP, Krisztián Lovassy
Stages 3 & 4a (ITT), Matija Kvasina
2013
Overall Tour de Serbie, Ivan Stević
Moldova National Time Trial championships, Nicolae Tanovițchii
Serbia National Road Race championships, Ivan Stević
Moldova National U23 Time Trial championships, Sergiu Cioban
2014
Banja Luka-Belgrade II, Ivan Stević
Stage 3b Tour of Szeklerland, Sebastien Anaya
2015
Romania U23 Time Trial championships, Andrei Barbu
2017
Prologue Tour of Szeklerland, Nicolae Tanovițchii
Stage 1 Tour de Serbia, Hugo Ángel Velázquez

== National champions ==
2011
Moldova National Time Trial, Sergiu Cioban
2012
Moldova National Time Trial, Sergiu Cioban
2013
Moldova National Time Trial, Nicolae Tanovițchii
Serbia National Road Race, Ivan Stević
Moldova National U23 Time Trial, Sergiu Cioban
2015
Romania U23 Time Trial, Andrei Barbu
