= 2020 Tour of Romania =

2020 UCI Europe Tour

Race details
- Dates: 8–13 September 2020
- Stages: 5 + Prologue
- Distance: 895.8 km (556.6 mi)
- Winning time: 18h 55' 26"

Results
Jersey awarded to the overall winner	Winner	Eduard-Michael Grosu (ROU)	(Romania)
	Second	Nikodemus Holler (GER)	(Bike Aid)
	Third	Szymon Krawczyk (POL)	(CCC Development Team)
Jersey awarded to the mountains classification winner	Mountains	Alexandr Ovsyannikov (KAZ)	(Vino–Astana Motors)
Jersey awarded to the youth classification winner	Youth	Szymon Krawczyk (POL)	(CCC Development Team)
Jersey awarded to the sprints classification winner	Sprints	Matvey Nikitin (KAZ)	(Vino–Astana Motors)
	Team	Bike Aid	

The 2020 Tour of Romania was a six-day cycling stage race that took place in Romania from 8 to 13 September. The race was the 53rd edition of the Tour of Romania. The tour was rated as a 2.2 event, as part of the 2020 UCI Europe Tour.

== Teams ==
Five UCI Continental teams, three domestic teams, and three national teams made up the eleven teams that participated in the race. Five teams (Bike Aid, Bulgaria, CSA Steaua București, Giotti Victoria, and Vino–Astana Motors) entered seven riders each, while two teams entered six (Team Novak and UVT-Devron West Cycling Team), five (CCC Development Team and Romania), and four (Moldova and Olimpic Torpedo Zărnești) each per team. Cambodia Cycling Academy withdrew shortly before the race. 56 of the 65 riders in the race finished.

UCI Continental Teams

- Bike Aid
- ~~Cambodia Cycling Academy~~
- CCC Development Team
- Giotti Victoria
- Team Novak
- Vino–Astana Motors

Domestic Teams

- CSA Steaua București
- Olimpic Torpedo Zărnești
- UVT-Devron West Cycling Team

National Teams

- Bulgaria
- Moldova
- Romania

== Route ==
Stage characteristics and winners
Stage	Date	Route	Distance	Type	Winner
P	8 September	Timișoara	3.6 km (2.2 mi)	Individual time trial	Justin Wolf (GER)
1	9 September	Timișoara to Oradea	171.2 km (106.4 mi)	Flat stage	Andrea Guardini (ITA)
2	10 September	Oradea to Cluj-Napoca	208.1 km (129.3 mi)	Intermediate stage	Lucas Carstensen (GER)
3	11 September	Târgu Mureș to Lake Sfânta Ana	203.4 km (126.4 mi)	Intermediate stage	Eduard-Michael Grosu (ROU)
4	12 September	Cârțișoara to Curtea de Argeș	209.5 km (130.2 mi)	Mountain stage	Eduard-Michael Grosu (ROU)
5	13 September	Bucharest	100 km (62 mi)	Flat stage	Andrea Guardini (ITA)
Total			895.8 km (556.6 mi)		

== Stages ==
=== Prologue ===
8 September 2020 — Timișoara, 3.6 km (2.2 mi) (ITT)

Prologue Result
Rank	Rider	Team	Time
1	Justin Wolf (GER)	Bike Aid	4' 33"
2	Eduard-Michael Grosu (ROU)	Romania	+ 1"
3	Szymon Krawczyk (POL)	CCC Development Team	+ 1"
4	Daniel Crista (ROU)	CSA Steaua București	+ 1"
5	Jesse de Rooij (NED)	Bike Aid	+ 6"
6	Lucas Carstensen (GER)	Bike Aid	+ 7"
7	Viktor Filutás (HUN)	Giotti Victoria	+ 7"
8	Erik Bergström Frisk (SWE)	Bike Aid	+ 8"
9	Emil Dima (ROU)	Giotti Victoria	+ 8"
10	Nikodemus Holler (GER)	Bike Aid	+ 9"

General classification after Prologue
Rank	Rider	Team	Time
1	Justin Wolf (GER)	Bike Aid	4' 33"
2	Eduard-Michael Grosu (ROU)	Romania	+ 1"
3	Szymon Krawczyk (POL)	CCC Development Team	+ 1"
4	Daniel Crista (ROU)	CSA Steaua București	+ 1"
5	Jesse de Rooij (NED)	Bike Aid	+ 6"
6	Lucas Carstensen (GER)	Bike Aid	+ 7"
7	Viktor Filutás (HUN)	Giotti Victoria	+ 7"
8	Erik Bergström Frisk (SWE)	Bike Aid	+ 8"
9	Emil Dima (ROU)	Giotti Victoria	+ 8"
10	Nikodemus Holler (GER)	Bike Aid	+ 9"

=== Stage 1 ===
9 September 2020 — Timișoara to Oradea, 171.2 km (106.4 mi)

Stage 1 Result
Rank	Rider	Team	Time
1	Andrea Guardini (ITA)	Giotti Victoria	3h 48' 23"
2	Gleb Brussenskiy (KAZ)	Vino–Astana Motors	+ 0"
3	Eduard-Michael Grosu (ROU)	Romania	+ 0"
4	Lucas Carstensen (GER)	Bike Aid	+ 0"
5	Szymon Krawczyk (POL)	CCC Development Team	+ 0"
6	Adi-Narcis Marcu (ROU)	Olimpic Torpedo Zărnești	+ 0"
7	Daniel Crista (ROU)	CSA Steaua București	+ 0"
8	Andrei Ionuţ (ROU)	UVT-Devron West Cycling Team	+ 0"
9	Yegor Dementyev (UKR)	Team Novak	+ 0"
10	Federico Zurlo (ITA)	Giotti Victoria	+ 0"

General classification after Stage 1
Rank	Rider	Team	Time
1	Eduard-Michael Grosu (ROU)	Romania	3h 52' 50"
2	Justin Wolf (GER)	Bike Aid	+ 6"
3	Szymon Krawczyk (POL)	CCC Development Team	+ 7"
4	Daniel Crista (ROU)	CSA Steaua București	+ 7"
5	Andrea Guardini (ITA)	Giotti Victoria	+ 9"
6	Jesse de Rooij (NED)	Bike Aid	+ 12"
7	Lucas Carstensen (GER)	Bike Aid	+ 13"
8	Nikodemus Holler (GER)	Bike Aid	+ 13"
9	Viktor Filutás (HUN)	Giotti Victoria	+ 13"
10	Erik Bergström Frisk (SWE)	Bike Aid	+ 14"

=== Stage 2 ===
10 September 2020 — Oradea to Cluj-Napoca, 208.1 km (129.3 mi)

Stage 2 Result
Rank	Rider	Team	Time
1	Lucas Carstensen (GER)	Bike Aid	4h 45' 18"
2	Eduard-Michael Grosu (ROU)	Romania	+ 0"
3	Szymon Krawczyk (POL)	CCC Development Team	+ 0"
4	Johnatan Cañaveral (COL)	Giotti Victoria	+ 0"
5	Federico Zurlo (ITA)	Giotti Victoria	+ 0"
6	Gleb Brussenskiy (KAZ)	Vino–Astana Motors	+ 0"
7	Viktor Filutás (HUN)	Giotti Victoria	+ 0"
8	Emil Dima (ROU)	Giotti Victoria	+ 0"
9	Nikodemus Holler (GER)	Bike Aid	+ 0"
10	Serghei Țvetcov (ROU)	Romania	+ 0"

General classification after Stage 2
Rank	Rider	Team	Time
1	Eduard-Michael Grosu (ROU)	Romania	8h 37' 59"
2	Szymon Krawczyk (POL)	CCC Development Team	+ 10"
3	Lucas Carstensen (GER)	Bike Aid	+ 12"
4	Justin Wolf (GER)	Bike Aid	+ 15"
5	Daniel Crista (ROU)	CSA Steaua București	+ 16"
6	Jesse de Rooij (NED)	Bike Aid	+ 21"
7	Nikodemus Holler (GER)	Bike Aid	+ 22"
8	Viktor Filutás (HUN)	Giotti Victoria	+ 22"
9	Erik Bergström Frisk (SWE)	Bike Aid	+ 23"
10	Emil Dima (ROU)	Giotti Victoria	+ 23"

=== Stage 3 ===
11 September 2020 — Târgu Mureș to Lake Sfânta Ana, 203.4 km (126.4 mi)

Stage 3 Result
Rank	Rider	Team	Time
1	Eduard-Michael Grosu (ROU)	Romania	5h 02' 51"
2	Nikodemus Holler (GER)	Bike Aid	+ 0"
3	Gleb Brussenskiy (KAZ)	Vino–Astana Motors	+ 0"
4	Piotr Pekala (POL)	CCC Development Team	+ 0"
5	Johnatan Cañaveral (COL)	Giotti Victoria	+ 0"
6	Viktor Filutás (HUN)	Giotti Victoria	+ 0"
7	Serghei Țvetcov (ROU)	Romania	+ 0"
8	Erik Bergström Frisk (SWE)	Bike Aid	+ 0"
9	Daniil Pronskiy (KAZ)	Vino–Astana Motors	+ 0"
10	Emil Dima (ROU)	Giotti Victoria	+ 0"

General classification after Stage 3
Rank	Rider	Team	Time
1	Eduard-Michael Grosu (ROU)	Romania	13h 40' 40"
2	Nikodemus Holler (GER)	Bike Aid	+ 25"
3	Viktor Filutás (HUN)	Giotti Victoria	+ 32"
4	Erik Bergström Frisk (SWE)	Bike Aid	+ 33"
5	Emil Dima (ROU)	Giotti Victoria	+ 33"
6	Serghei Țvetcov (ROU)	Romania	+ 34"
7	Adne van Engelen (NED)	Bike Aid	+ 36"
8	Johnatan Cañaveral (COL)	Giotti Victoria	+ 36"
9	Szymon Krawczyk (POL)	CCC Development Team	+ 38"
10	Piotr Pekala (POL)	CCC Development Team	+ 39"

=== Stage 4 ===
12 September 2020 — Cârțișoara to Curtea de Argeș, 209.5 km (130.2 mi)

Stage 4 Result
Rank	Rider	Team	Time
1	Eduard-Michael Grosu (ROU)	Romania	3h 00' 37"
2	Gleb Brussenskiy (KAZ)	Vino–Astana Motors	+ 0"
3	Szymon Krawczyk (POL)	CCC Development Team	+ 0"
4	Emil Dima (ROU)	Giotti Victoria	+ 0"
5	Viktor Filutás (HUN)	Giotti Victoria	+ 0"
6	Nikodemus Holler (GER)	Bike Aid	+ 0"
7	Simone Sanò (ITA)	Team Novak	+ 0"
8	Serghei Țvetcov (ROU)	Romania	+ 0"
9	Piotr Pekala (POL)	CCC Development Team	+ 0"
10	Erik Bergström Frisk (SWE)	Bike Aid	+ 0"

General classification after Stage 4
Rank	Rider	Team	Time
1	Eduard-Michael Grosu (ROU)	Romania	16h 41' 07"
2	Nikodemus Holler (GER)	Bike Aid	+ 35"
3	Viktor Filutás (HUN)	Giotti Victoria	+ 42"
4	Erik Bergström Frisk (SWE)	Bike Aid	+ 43"
5	Emil Dima (ROU)	Giotti Victoria	+ 43"
6	Szymon Krawczyk (POL)	CCC Development Team	+ 44"
7	Serghei Țvetcov (ROU)	Romania	+ 44"
8	Adne van Engelen (NED)	Bike Aid	+ 46"
9	Johnatan Cañaveral (COL)	Giotti Victoria	+ 46"
10	Gleb Brussenskiy (KAZ)	Vino–Astana Motors	+ 48"

=== Stage 5 ===
13 September 2020 — Bucharest, 100 km (62 mi)

Stage 5 Result
Rank	Rider	Team	Time
1	Andrea Guardini (ITA)	Giotti Victoria	2h 14' 25"
2	Eduard-Michael Grosu (ROU)	Romania	+ 0"
3	Szymon Krawczyk (POL)	CCC Development Team	+ 0"
4	Lucas Carstensen (GER)	Bike Aid	+ 0"
5	Andrei Ionuţ (ROU)	UVT-Devron West Cycling Team	+ 0"
6	Adi-Narcis Marcu (ROU)	Olimpic Torpedo Zărnești	+ 0"
7	Gleb Brussenskiy (KAZ)	Vino–Astana Motors	+ 0"
8	Gergő Orosz (HUN)	Team Novak	+ 0"
9	Stepan Astafyev (KAZ)	Vino–Astana Motors	+ 0"
10	Balázs Rózsa (HUN)	Team Novak	+ 0"

General classification after Stage 5
Rank	Rider	Team	Time
1	Eduard-Michael Grosu (ROU)	Romania	18h 55' 26"
2	Nikodemus Holler (GER)	Bike Aid	+ 41"
3	Szymon Krawczyk (POL)	CCC Development Team	+ 45"
4	Viktor Filutás (HUN)	Giotti Victoria	+ 46"
5	Serghei Țvetcov (ROU)	Romania	+ 47"
6	Erik Bergström Frisk (SWE)	Bike Aid	+ 49"
7	Emil Dima (ROU)	Giotti Victoria	+ 49"
8	Johnatan Cañaveral (COL)	Giotti Victoria	+ 51"
9	Adne van Engelen (NED)	Bike Aid	+ 52"
10	Gleb Brussenskiy (KAZ)	Vino–Astana Motors	+ 54"

== Classification leadership table ==
Classification leadership by stage
Stage	Winner	General classification	Mountains classification	Sprints classification	Young rider classification	Romanian rider classification	Team classification
P	Justin Wolf	Justin Wolf	Not awarded	Not awarded	Szymon Krawczyk	Eduard-Michael Grosu	Bike Aid
1	Andrea Guardini	Eduard-Michael Grosu	Not awarded	Stepan Astafyev	Szymon Krawczyk	Eduard-Michael Grosu	Bike Aid
2	Lucas Carstensen	Eduard-Michael Grosu	Alexandr Ovsyannikov	Alexandr Ovsyannikov	Szymon Krawczyk	Eduard-Michael Grosu	Bike Aid
3	Eduard-Michael Grosu	Eduard-Michael Grosu	Matvey Nikitin	Matvey Nikitin	Erik Bergström Frisk	Eduard-Michael Grosu	Bike Aid
4	Eduard-Michael Grosu	Eduard-Michael Grosu	Alexandr Ovsyannikov	Matvey Nikitin	Erik Bergström Frisk	Eduard-Michael Grosu	Bike Aid
5	Andrea Guardini	Eduard-Michael Grosu	Alexandr Ovsyannikov	Matvey Nikitin	Szymon Krawczyk	Eduard-Michael Grosu	Bike Aid
Final		Eduard-Michael Grosu	Alexandr Ovsyannikov	Matvey Nikitin	Szymon Krawczyk	Eduard-Michael Grosu	Bike Aid

== Final classification standings ==
Legend
Denotes the winner of the general classification	Denotes the winner of the young rider classification
Denotes the winner of the mountains classification	Denotes the winner of the Romanian rider classification
Denotes the winner of the sprints classification	Denotes the winner of the team classification

=== General classification ===
Final general classification (1–10)
Rank	Rider	Team	Time
1	Eduard-Michael Grosu (ROU)	Romania	18h 55' 26"
2	Nikodemus Holler (GER)	Bike Aid	+ 41"
3	Szymon Krawczyk (POL)	CCC Development Team	+ 45"
4	Viktor Filutás (HUN)	Giotti Victoria	+ 46"
5	Serghei Țvetcov (ROU)	Romania	+ 47"
6	Erik Bergström Frisk (SWE)	Bike Aid	+ 49"
7	Emil Dima (ROU)	Giotti Victoria	+ 49"
8	Johnatan Cañaveral (COL)	Giotti Victoria	+ 51"
9	Adne van Engelen (NED)	Bike Aid	+ 52"
10	Gleb Brussenskiy (KAZ)	Vino–Astana Motors	+ 54"

=== Mountains classification ===
Final mountains classification (1–10)
Rank	Rider	Team	Points
1	Alexandr Ovsyannikov (KAZ)	Vino–Astana Motors	32
2	Johnatan Cañaveral (COL)	Giotti Victoria	25
3	Matvey Nikitin (KAZ)	Vino–Astana Motors	22
4	Adne van Engelen (NED)	Bike Aid	20
5	Gergő Orosz (HUN)	Team Novak	18
6	Federico Zurlo (ITA)	Giotti Victoria	18
7	Erik Bergström Frisk (SWE)	Bike Aid	15
8	Piotr Pekala (POL)	CCC Development Team	10
9	Gleb Brussenskiy (KAZ)	Vino–Astana Motors	8
10	Serghei Țvetcov (ROU)	Romania	6

=== Sprints classification ===
Final sprints classification (1–10)
Rank	Rider	Team	Points
1	Matvey Nikitin (KAZ)	Vino–Astana Motors	12
2	Alexandr Ovsyannikov (KAZ)	Vino–Astana Motors	7
3	Eduard-Michael Grosu (ROU)	Romania	6
4	Lucas Carstensen (GER)	Bike Aid	6
5	Stepan Astafyev (KAZ)	Vino–Astana Motors	5
6	Andrei Cojanu (ROU)	UVT-Devron West Cycling Team	5
7	Gergő Orosz (HUN)	Team Novak	5
8	Serghei Țvetcov (ROU)	Romania	3
9	Igor Chzhan (KAZ)	Vino–Astana Motors	3
10	Emil Chepetan (ROU)	UVT-Devron West Cycling Team	3

=== Young rider classification ===
Final young rider classification (1–10)
Rank	Rider	Team	Time
1	Szymon Krawczyk (POL)	CCC Development Team	18h 56' 11"
2	Erik Bergström Frisk (SWE)	Bike Aid	+ 4"
3	Gleb Brussenskiy (KAZ)	Vino–Astana Motors	+ 9"
4	Piotr Pekala (POL)	CCC Development Team	+ 10"
5	Daniil Pronskiy (KAZ)	Vino–Astana Motors	+ 29"
6	Dominik Gorak (POL)	CCC Development Team	+ 10' 30"
7	Iustin-Iodan Văidian (ROU)	UVT-Devron West Cycling Team	+ 12' 32"
8	Tsvetan Ivanov (BUL)	Bulgaria	+ 24' 20"
9	Gerhard-Cristin Moldansky (ROU)	Romania	+ 35' 02"
10	Alexandr Semenov (KAZ)	Vino–Astana Motors	+ 40' 20"

=== Romanian rider classification ===
Final Romanian rider classification (1–10)
Rank	Rider	Team	Time
1	Eduard-Michael Grosu (ROU)	Romania	18h 55' 26"
2	Serghei Țvetcov (ROU)	Romania	+ 47"
3	Emil Dima (ROU)	Giotti Victoria	+ 49"
4	Iustin-Iodan Văidian (ROU)	UVT-Devron West Cycling Team	+ 13' 17"
5	Andrei Cosmin Bidilici (ROU)	Romania	+ 23' 16"
6	Gerhard-Cristin Moldansky (ROU)	Romania	+ 35' 47"
7	Valentin Plesea (ROU)	CSA Steaua București	+ 50' 38"
8	Adi-Narcis Marcu (ROU)	Olimpic Torpedo Zărnești	+ 55' 47"
9	Leonard Barbu (ROU)	CSA Steaua București	+ 1h 01' 47"
10	Carol-Eduard Novak (ROU)	Team Novak	+ 1h 07' 16"

=== Team classification ===
Final team classification (1–10)
Rank	Team	Time
1	Bike Aid	56h 48' 34"
2	Giotti Victoria	+ 12"
3	CCC Development Team	+ 10' 39"
4	Vino–Astana Motors	+ 11' 10"
5	Romania	+ 22' 26"
6	Team Novak	+ 38' 14"
7	Bulgaria	+ 49' 05"
8	CSA Steaua București	+ 2h 03' 40"
9	UVT-Devron West Cycling Team	+ 2h 24' 08"
10	Olimpic Torpedo Zărnești	+ 3h 13' 33"

== See also ==
- 2020 in men's road cycling
- 2020 in sports
