= 2020 Bora–Hansgrohe season =

Bora–Hansgrohe
- 2020 season
- UCI code: BOH
- Status: UCI WorldTeam
- Manager: Ralph Denk
- Main sponsor(s): BORA & Hansgrohe
- Based: Germany
- Bicycles: Specialized
- Groupset: Shimano

Season victories
- One-day races: 2
- Stage race overall: 2
- Stage race stages: 16
- National Championships: 1
- Most wins: Pascal Ackermann (9)
- Jersey

The 2020 cycling season for Bora–Hansgrohe began in January at the Tour Down Under in Australia.

== 2020 roster ==
As of 1 January 2020.

Rider	Date of birth
Pascal Ackermann (GER)	17 January 1994 (aged 25)
Erik Baška (SVK)	12 January 1994 (aged 25)
Cesare Benedetti (ITA)	3 August 1987 (aged 32)
Maciej Bodnar (POL)	7 March 1985 (aged 34)
Emanuel Buchmann (GER)	18 November 1992 (aged 27)
Marcus Burghardt (GER)	30 June 1983 (aged 36)
Jempy Drucker (LUX)	3 September 1986 (aged 33)
Matteo Fabbro (ITA)	10 April 1995 (aged 24)
Patrick Gamper (AUT)	18 February 1997 (aged 22)
Oscar Gatto (ITA)	1 January 1985 (aged 35)
Felix Großschartner (AUT)	23 December 1993 (aged 26)
Lennard Kämna (GER)	9 September 1996 (aged 23)
Patrick Konrad (AUT)	13 October 1991 (aged 28)
Martin Laas (EST)	15 September 1993 (aged 26)

Rider	Date of birth
Rafał Majka (POL)	12 September 1989 (aged 30)
Jay McCarthy (AUS)	8 September 1992 (aged 27)
Gregor Mühlberger (AUT)	4 April 1994 (aged 25)
Daniel Oss (ITA)	13 January 1987 (aged 32)
Paweł Poljański (POL)	6 May 1990 (aged 29)
Lukas Pöstlberger (AUT)	10 January 1992 (aged 27)
Juraj Sagan (SVK)	23 December 1988 (aged 31)
Peter Sagan (SVK)	26 January 1990 (aged 29)
Maximilian Schachmann (GER)	9 January 1994 (aged 25)
Ide Schelling (NED)	6 February 1998 (aged 21)
Andreas Schillinger (GER)	13 July 1983 (aged 36)
Michael Schwarzmann (GER)	7 January 1991 (aged 28)
Rüdiger Selig (GER)	19 February 1989 (aged 30)

Riders who joined the team for the 2020 season

Rider	2019 team
Matteo Fabbro	Team Katusha–Alpecin
Patrick Gamper	neo-pro (Tirol KTM Cycling Team)
Lennard Kämna	Team Sunweb
Martin Laas	neo-pro (Team Illuminate)
Ide Schelling	neo-pro (SEG Racing Academy)

Riders who left the team during or after the 2019 season

Rider	2020 team
Shane Archbold	Deceuninck–Quick-Step
Sam Bennett	Deceuninck–Quick-Step
Davide Formolo	UAE Team Emirates
Peter Kennaugh	Indefinite break
Leopold König	
Christoph Pfingsten	Team Jumbo–Visma

== Season victories ==
Date	Race	Competition	Rider	Country	Location
31 January	Trofeo Serra de Tramuntana	UCI Europe Tour	Emanuel Buchmann (GER)	Spain	Deià
16 February	Clásica de Almería	UCI Europe Tour; UCI ProSeries	Pascal Ackermann (GER)	Spain	Roquetas de Mar
23 February	UAE Tour, Stage 1	UCI World Tour	Pascal Ackermann (GER)	United Arab Emirates	Dubai Silicon Oasis
8 March	Paris–Nice, Stage 1	UCI World Tour	Maximilian Schachmann (GER)	France	Plaisir
14 March	Paris–Nice, Overall	UCI World Tour	Maximilian Schachmann (GER)	France	
24 July	Sibiu Cycling Tour, Stage 1	UCI Europe Tour	Gregor Mühlberger (AUT)	Romania	Bâlea Lac
24 July	Sibiu Cycling Tour, Stage 2	UCI Europe Tour	Pascal Ackermann (GER)	Romania	Sibiu
24 July	Sibiu Cycling Tour, Stage 3a	UCI Europe Tour	Gregor Mühlberger (AUT)	Romania	Arena Platos
24 July	Sibiu Cycling Tour, Stage 3b	UCI Europe Tour	Pascal Ackermann (GER)	Romania	Sibiu
26 July	Sibiu Cycling Tour, Overall	UCI Europe Tour	Gregor Mühlberger (AUT)	Romania	
26 July	Sibiu Cycling Tour, Points classification	UCI Europe Tour	Gregor Mühlberger (AUT)	Romania	
26 July	Sibiu Cycling Tour, Mountains classification	UCI Europe Tour	Gregor Mühlberger (AUT)	Romania	
28 July	Vuelta a Burgos, Stage 1	UCI Europe Tour; UCI ProSeries	Felix Großschartner (AUT)	Spain	Mirador del Castillo
15 August	Critérium du Dauphiné, Stage 4	UCI World Tour	Lennard Kämna (GER)	France	Megève
7 September	Tirreno–Adriatico, Stage 1	UCI World Tour	Pascal Ackermann (GER)	Italy	Lido di Camaiore
8 September	Tirreno–Adriatico, Stage 2	UCI World Tour	Pascal Ackermann (GER)	Italy	Follonica
14 September	Tirreno–Adriatico, Points classification	UCI World Tour	Pascal Ackermann (GER)	Italy	
15 September	Tour de France, Stage 16	UCI World Tour	Lennard Kämna (GER)	France	Villard-de-Lans
16 September	Okolo Slovenska, Stage 1a	UCI Europe Tour	Martin Laas (EST)	Slovakia	Žilina
18 September	Okolo Slovenska, Stage 3	UCI Europe Tour	Martin Laas (EST)	Slovakia	Žiar nad Hronom
19 September	Okolo Slovenska, Points classification	UCI Europe Tour	Martin Laas (EST)	Slovakia	
13 October	Giro d'Italia, Stage 10	UCI World Tour	Peter Sagan (SVK)	Italy	Tortoreto
29 October	Vuelta a España, Stage 9	UCI World Tour	Pascal Ackermann (GER)	Spain	Aguilar de Campoo
8 November	Vuelta a España, Stage 18	UCI World Tour	Pascal Ackermann (GER)	Spain	Madrid

== National, Continental and World champions ==
Date	Discipline	Jersey	Rider	Country	Location
22 August	Slovak National Road Race Championships		Juraj Sagan (SVK)	Slovakia	
