= 2020 Sibiu Cycling Tour =

2020 UCI Europe Tour

Race details
- Dates: 23 – 26 July 2020
- Stages: 5
- Distance: 479.9 km (298.2 mi)
- Winning time: 11h 36' 44"

Results
Jersey awarded to the overall winner	Winner	Gregor Mühlberger (AUT)	(Bora–Hansgrohe)
	Second	Patrick Konrad (AUT)	(Bora–Hansgrohe)
	Third	Matteo Badilatti (SUI)	(Israel Start-Up Nation)
Jersey awarded to the points classification winner	Points	Gregor Mühlberger (AUT)	(Bora–Hansgrohe)
Jersey awarded to the mountains classification winner	Mountains	Gregor Mühlberger (AUT)	(Bora–Hansgrohe)
Jersey awarded to the young rider classification winner	Young rider	Erik Bergström Frisk (SWE)	(Bike Aid)
Jersey awarded to the sprints classification winner	Sprints	Paweł Bernas (POL)	(Mazowsze Serce Polski)
Jersey awarded to the combativity classification winner	Combativity	Meindert Weulink (NED)	(à Bloc)
	Team	Elkov–Kasper	

The 2020 Sibiu Cycling Tour was a men's road bicycle race which took place from 23 to 26 July 2020 in and around the city of Sibiu, Romania. The race was a 2.1-rated event as part of the 2020 UCI Europe Tour and is made up of five stages. This race was the 10th edition of the Sibiu Cycling Tour.

== Teams ==
Twenty-two teams participated in the race, including two UCI WorldTeams, three UCI ProTeams, sixteen UCI Continental teams, and one national team. Each team entered six riders, with the exception of Bardiani–CSF–Faizanè, Cycling Team Friuli ASD, and Team Novak, which each submitted five riders. 129 riders started the race, of which 104 finished.

UCI WorldTeams

- Bora–Hansgrohe
- Israel Start-Up Nation

UCI ProTeams

- Bardiani–CSF–Faizanè
- Nippo–Delko–One Provence
- Vini Zabù–KTM

UCI Continental Teams

- à Bloc
- Akros–Excelsior–Thömus
- Amore & Vita–Prodir
- Bike Aid
- CCC Development Team
- Cycling Team Friuli ASD
- D'Amico–UM Tools
- Elkov–Kasper
- Giotti Victoria
- Mazowsze Serce Polski
- Meridiana–Kamen
- Team Novak
- Team SKS Sauerland NRW
- Voster ATS Team
- Wibatech Merx 7R
- Work Service–Dinatek–Vega

National Teams

- Romania

== Route ==
Stage characteristics and winners
Stage	Date	Course	Distance	Type	Stage winner
P	23 July	Sibiu to Sibiu	2.5 km (1.6 mi)	Prologue	Nikodemus Holler (GER)
1	24 July	Sibiu to Bâlea Lac	183 km (114 mi)	Mountain stage	Gregor Mühlberger (AUT)
2	25 July	Sibiu to Sibiu	179.8 km (111.7 mi)	Hilly stage	Pascal Ackermann (GER)
3a	26 July	Curmătura Ștezii to Arena Platos	12 km (7.5 mi)	Mountain time trial	Gregor Mühlberger (AUT)
3b	26 July	Sibiu to Sibiu	102.6 km (63.8 mi)	Flat stage	Pascal Ackermann (GER)
Total		479.9 km (298.2 mi)			

== Stages ==
=== Prologue ===
23 July 2020 – Sibiu to Sibiu, 2.5 km (2 mi) (ITT)

Prologue Result
Rank	Rider	Team	Time
1	Nikodemus Holler (GER)	Bike Aid	3' 34"
2	Kacper Walkowiak (POL)	CCC Development Team	+ 2"
3	Wojciech Sykala (POL)	Voster ATS Team	+ 3"
4	Adam Ťoupalík (CZE)	Elkov–Kasper	+ 5"
5	Matteo Rotondi (ITA)	Work Service–Dinatek–Vega	+ 9"
6	Jon Knolle (GER)	Team SKS Sauerland NRW	+ 10"
7	Patryk Stosz (POL)	Voster ATS Team	+ 12"
8	Iustin-Iodan Văidian (ROU)	Romania	+ 13"
9	Rudy Barbier (FRA)	Israel Start-Up Nation	+ 13"
10	Patrick Konrad (AUT)	Bora–Hansgrohe	+ 15"

General classification after Prologue
Rank	Rider	Team	Time
1	Nikodemus Holler (GER)	Bike Aid	3' 34"
2	Kacper Walkowiak (POL)	CCC Development Team	+ 2"
3	Wojciech Sykala (POL)	Voster ATS Team	+ 3"
4	Adam Ťoupalík (CZE)	Elkov–Kasper	+ 5"
5	Matteo Rotondi (ITA)	Work Service–Dinatek–Vega	+ 9"
6	Jon Knolle (GER)	Team SKS Sauerland NRW	+ 10"
7	Patryk Stosz (POL)	Voster ATS Team	+ 12"
8	Iustin-Iodan Văidian (ROU)	Romania	+ 13"
9	Rudy Barbier (FRA)	Israel Start-Up Nation	+ 13"
10	Patrick Konrad (AUT)	Bora–Hansgrohe	+ 15"

=== Stage 1 ===
24 July 2020 – Sibiu to Bâlea Lac, 183 km (114 mi)

Stage 1 Result
Rank	Rider	Team	Time
1	Gregor Mühlberger (AUT)	Bora–Hansgrohe	4h 52' 11"
2	Patrick Konrad (AUT)	Bora–Hansgrohe	+ 0"
3	Matteo Badilatti (SUI)	Israel Start-Up Nation	+ 16"
4	Rémy Rochas (FRA)	Nippo–Delko–One Provence	+ 1' 04"
5	Luca Wackermann (ITA)	Vini Zabù–KTM	+ 1' 41"
6	Piotr Brożyna (POL)	Voster ATS Team	+ 3' 20"
7	Davide Rebellin (ITA)	Meridiana–Kamen	+ 4' 18"
8	Erik Bergström Frisk (SWE)	Bike Aid	+ 4' 22"
9	Raul Colombo (ITA)	Work Service–Dinatek–Vega	+ 4' 26"
10	Karel Hník (CZE)	Elkov–Kasper	+ 4' 30"

General classification after Stage 1
Rank	Rider	Team	Time
1	Patrick Konrad (AUT)	Bora–Hansgrohe	4h 55' 54"
2	Gregor Mühlberger (AUT)	Bora–Hansgrohe	+ 3"
3	Matteo Badilatti (SUI)	Israel Start-Up Nation	+ 53"
4	Rémy Rochas (FRA)	Nippo–Delko–One Provence	+ 1' 20"
5	Luca Wackermann (ITA)	Vini Zabù–KTM	+ 2' 40"
6	Piotr Brożyna (POL)	Voster ATS Team	+ 3' 38"
7	Erik Bergström Frisk (SWE)	Bike Aid	+ 4' 40"
8	Davide Rebellin (ITA)	Meridiana–Kamen	+ 4' 40"
9	Karel Hník (CZE)	Elkov–Kasper	+ 4' 45"
10	Raul Colombo (ITA)	Work Service–Dinatek–Vega	+ 5' 10"

=== Stage 2 ===
25 July 2020 – Sibiu to Sibiu, 179.8 km (112 mi)

Stage 2 Result
Rank	Rider	Team	Time
1	Pascal Ackermann (GER)	Bora–Hansgrohe	3h 58' 58"
2	Rudy Barbier (FRA)	Israel Start-Up Nation	+ 0"
3	Riccardo Stacchiotti (ITA)	Vini Zabù–KTM	+ 0"
4	Eduard-Michael Grosu (ROU)	Nippo–Delko–One Provence	+ 0"
5	Adam Ťoupalík (CZE)	Elkov–Kasper	+ 0"
6	Patryk Stosz (POL)	Voster ATS Team	+ 0"
7	Paweł Bernas (POL)	Mazowsze Serce Polski	+ 0"
8	Filippo Fiorelli (ITA)	Bardiani–CSF–Faizanè	+ 0"
9	Lars Kulbe (GER)	Team SKS Sauerland NRW	+ 0"
10	Petr Kelemen (CZE)	CCC Development Team	+ 0"

General classification after Stage 2
Rank	Rider	Team	Time
1	Patrick Konrad (AUT)	Bora–Hansgrohe	8h 54' 52"
2	Gregor Mühlberger (AUT)	Bora–Hansgrohe	+ 3"
3	Matteo Badilatti (SUI)	Israel Start-Up Nation	+ 53"
4	Rémy Rochas (FRA)	Nippo–Delko–One Provence	+ 1' 20"
5	Luca Wackermann (ITA)	Vini Zabù–KTM	+ 2' 40"
6	Piotr Brożyna (POL)	Voster ATS Team	+ 3' 38"
7	Davide Rebellin (ITA)	Meridiana–Kamen	+ 4' 40"
8	Karel Hník (CZE)	Elkov–Kasper	+ 4' 45"
9	Petr Kelemen (CZE)	CCC Development Team	+ 5' 21"
10	Robin Froidevaux (SUI)	Akros–Excelsior–Thömus	+ 5' 28"

=== Stage 3a ===
26 July 2020 – Curmătura Ștezii to Arena Platos, 12 km (7 mi) (ITT)

Stage 3a Result
Rank	Rider	Team	Time
1	Gregor Mühlberger (AUT)	Bora–Hansgrohe	26' 11"
2	Matteo Badilatti (SUI)	Israel Start-Up Nation	+ 1' 02"
3	Patrick Konrad (AUT)	Bora–Hansgrohe	+ 1' 04"
4	Rémy Rochas (FRA)	Nippo–Delko–One Provence	+ 1' 30"
5	Piotr Brożyna (POL)	Voster ATS Team	+ 1' 47"
6	Serghei Țvetcov (ROU)	Romania	+ 1' 50"
7	Adne van Engelen (NED)	Bike Aid	+ 2' 01"
8	Lucas De Rossi (FRA)	Nippo–Delko–One Provence	+ 2' 05"
9	Adam Stachowiak (POL)	Voster ATS Team	+ 2' 05"
10	Michael Kukrle (CZE)	Elkov–Kasper	+ 2' 20"

General classification after Stage 3a
Rank	Rider	Team	Time
1	Gregor Mühlberger (AUT)	Bora–Hansgrohe	9h 21' 06"
2	Patrick Konrad (AUT)	Bora–Hansgrohe	+ 1' 01"
3	Matteo Badilatti (SUI)	Israel Start-Up Nation	+ 1' 52"
4	Rémy Rochas (FRA)	Nippo–Delko–One Provence	+ 2' 47"
5	Piotr Brożyna (POL)	Voster ATS Team	+ 5' 22"
6	Luca Wackermann (ITA)	Vini Zabù–KTM	+ 5' 54"
7	Adne van Engelen (NED)	Bike Aid	+ 7' 41"
8	Davide Rebellin (ITA)	Meridiana–Kamen	+ 7' 47"
9	Marco Tizza (ITA)	Amore & Vita–Prodir	+ 7' 59"
10	Filippo Fiorelli (ITA)	Bardiani–CSF–Faizanè	+ 8' 04"

=== Stage 3b ===
26 July 2020 – Sibiu to Sibiu, 102.6 km (64 mi)

Stage 3b Result
Rank	Rider	Team	Time
1	Pascal Ackermann (GER)	Bora–Hansgrohe	2h 15' 38"
2	Michael Schwarzmann (GER)	Bora–Hansgrohe	+ 0"
3	Eduard-Michael Grosu (ROU)	Nippo–Delko–One Provence	+ 0"
4	Adam Ťoupalík (CZE)	Elkov–Kasper	+ 0"
5	Davide Appollonio (ITA)	Amore & Vita–Prodir	+ 0"
6	Lars Kulbe (GER)	Team SKS Sauerland NRW	+ 0"
7	Patryk Stosz (POL)	Voster ATS Team	+ 0"
8	Emanuele Onesti (ITA)	Giotti Victoria	+ 0"
9	Filippo Fiorelli (ITA)	Bardiani–CSF–Faizanè	+ 0"
10	Federico Burchio (ITA)	Work Service–Dinatek–Vega	+ 0"

General classification after Stage 3b
Rank	Rider	Team	Time
1	Gregor Mühlberger (AUT)	Bora–Hansgrohe	11h 36' 44"
2	Patrick Konrad (AUT)	Bora–Hansgrohe	+ 1' 01"
3	Matteo Badilatti (SUI)	Israel Start-Up Nation	+ 1' 52"
4	Rémy Rochas (FRA)	Nippo–Delko–One Provence	+ 2' 47"
5	Piotr Brożyna (POL)	Voster ATS Team	+ 5' 22"
6	Luca Wackermann (ITA)	Vini Zabù–KTM	+ 5' 54"
7	Adne van Engelen (NED)	Bike Aid	+ 7' 41"
8	Davide Rebellin (ITA)	Meridiana–Kamen	+ 7' 47"
9	Marco Tizza (ITA)	Amore & Vita–Prodir	+ 7' 59"
10	Filippo Fiorelli (ITA)	Bardiani–CSF–Faizanè	+ 8' 04"

== Classification leadership ==
Classification leadership by stage
Stage	Winner	General classification	Mountains classification	Young rider classification	Sprints classification	Points classification	Romanian rider classification	Combativity prize	Team classification
P	Nikodemus Holler	Nikodemus Holler	Not awarded	Kacper Walkowiak	Not awarded	Nikodemus Holler	Iustin-Ioan Vaidian	Not awarded	CCC Development Team
1	Gregor Mühlberger	Patrick Konrad	Gregor Mühlberger	Erik Bergström Frisk	Paweł Bernas	Patrick Konrad	Serghei Țvetcov	Paweł Bernas	Vini Zabù–KTM
2	Pascal Ackermann	Patrick Konrad	Gregor Mühlberger	Petr Kelemen	Paweł Bernas	Rudy Barbier	Serghei Țvetcov	Meindert Weulink	Vini Zabù–KTM
3a	Gregor Mühlberger	Gregor Mühlberger	Gregor Mühlberger	Erik Bergström Frisk	Paweł Bernas	Gregor Mühlberger	Serghei Țvetcov	Not awarded	Elkov–Kasper
3b	Pascal Ackermann	Gregor Mühlberger	Gregor Mühlberger	Erik Bergström Frisk	Paweł Bernas	Gregor Mühlberger	Serghei Țvetcov	Paweł Bernas	Elkov–Kasper
Final		Gregor Mühlberger	Gregor Mühlberger	Erik Bergström Frisk	Paweł Bernas	Gregor Mühlberger	Serghei Țvetcov	Meindert Weulink	Elkov–Kasper

== Final classification standings ==
Legend
Denotes the winner of the general classification	Denotes the winner of the mountains classification
Denotes the winner of the points classification	Denotes the winner of the young rider classification
Denotes the winner of the sprints classification	Denotes the winner of the Romanian rider classification

=== General classification ===
Final general classification (1–10)
Rank	Rider	Team	Time
1	Gregor Mühlberger (AUT)	Bora–Hansgrohe	11h 36' 44"
2	Patrick Konrad (AUT)	Bora–Hansgrohe	+ 1' 01"
3	Matteo Badilatti (SUI)	Israel Start-Up Nation	+ 1' 52"
4	Rémy Rochas (FRA)	Nippo–Delko–One Provence	+ 2' 47"
5	Piotr Brożyna (POL)	Voster ATS Team	+ 5' 22"
6	Luca Wackermann (ITA)	Vini Zabù–KTM	+ 5' 54"
7	Adne van Engelen (NED)	Bike Aid	+ 7' 41"
8	Davide Rebellin (ITA)	Meridiana–Kamen	+ 7' 47"
9	Marco Tizza (ITA)	Amore & Vita–Prodir	+ 7' 59"
10	Filippo Fiorelli (ITA)	Bardiani–CSF–Faizanè	+ 8' 04"

=== Points classification ===
Final points classification (1–10)
Rank	Rider	Team	Points
1	Gregor Mühlberger (AUT)	Bora–Hansgrohe	51
2	Pascal Ackermann (GER)	Bora–Hansgrohe	50
3	Patrick Konrad (AUT)	Bora–Hansgrohe	42
4	Adam Ťoupalík (CZE)	Elkov–Kasper	40
5	Matteo Badilatti (SUI)	Israel Start-Up Nation	36
6	Eduard-Michael Grosu (ROU)	Nippo–Delko–One Provence	30
7	Rémy Rochas (FRA)	Nippo–Delko–One Provence	28
8	Patryk Stosz (POL)	Voster ATS Team	28
9	Piotr Brożyna (POL)	Voster ATS Team	25
10	Nikodemus Holler (GER)	Bike Aid	25

=== Mountains classification ===
Final mountains classification (1–10)
Rank	Rider	Team	Points
1	Gregor Mühlberger (AUT)	Bora–Hansgrohe	37
2	Patrick Konrad (AUT)	Bora–Hansgrohe	24
3	Matteo Badilatti (SUI)	Israel Start-Up Nation	24
4	Rémy Rochas (FRA)	Nippo–Delko–One Provence	22
5	Piotr Brożyna (POL)	Voster ATS Team	12
6	Luca Wackermann (ITA)	Vini Zabù–KTM	12
7	Davide Rebellin (ITA)	Meridiana–Kamen	8
8	Erik Bergström Frisk (SWE)	Bike Aid	7
9	Raul Colombo (ITA)	Work Service–Dinatek–Vega	6
10	Tomasz Budzinski (POL)	Wibatech Merx 7R	6

=== Young rider classification ===
Final young rider classification (1–10)
Rank	Rider	Team	Time
1	Erik Bergström Frisk (SWE)	Bike Aid	11h 44' 56"
2	Petr Kelemen (CZE)	CCC Development Team	+ 1"
3	Robin Froidevaux (SUI)	Akros–Excelsior–Thömus	+ 38"
4	Davide Bais (ITA)	Cycling Team Friuli ASD	+ 2' 44"
5	Piotr Pekala (POL)	CCC Development Team	+ 3' 09"
6	Johannes Adamietz (GER)	Team SKS Sauerland NRW	+ 3' 38"
7	Antoine Debons (SUI)	Akros–Excelsior–Thömus	+ 3' 38"
8	Szymon Tracz (POL)	CCC Development Team	+ 6' 53"
9	Marcin Budziński (POL)	Wibatech Merx 7R	+ 7' 00"
10	Gabriele Petrelli (ITA)	Cycling Team Friuli ASD	+ 10' 43"

=== Team classification ===
Final team classification (1–10)
Rank	Team	Time
1	Elkov–Kasper	35h 17' 00"
2	Vini Zabù–KTM	+ 42"
3	Nippo–Delko–One Provence	+ 2' 12"
4	Bike Aid	+ 3' 35"
5	CCC Development Team	+ 5' 53"
6	Bora–Hansgrohe	+ 7' 51"
7	Mazowsze Serce Polski	+ 10' 49"
8	Israel Start-Up Nation	+ 13' 42"
9	Voster ATS Team	+ 13' 55"
10	Work Service–Dinatek–Vega	+ 15' 07"

=== Sprints classification ===
Final sprints classification (1–6)
Rank	Rider	Team	Points
1	Paweł Bernas (POL)	Mazowsze Serce Polski	13
2	Meindert Weulink (NED)	à Bloc	6
3	Petr Kelemen (CZE)	CCC Development Team	3
4	Nikodemus Holler (GER)	Bike Aid	2
5	Emil Dima (ROU)	Giotti Victoria	2
6	Erik Bergström Frisk (SWE)	Bike Aid	1

=== Romanian rider classification ===
Final Romanian rider classification (1–6)
Rank	Rider	Team	Time
1	Serghei Țvetcov (ROU)	Romania	11h 50' 05"
2	Eduard-Michael Grosu (ROU)	Nippo–Delko–One Provence	+ 9' 14"
3	Emil Dima (ROU)	Giotti Victoria	+ 16' 36"
4	Daniel Crista (ROU)	Romania	+ 24' 38"
5	Iustin-Ioan Văidian (ROU)	Romania	+ 32' 21"
6	Adi-Narcis Marcu (ROU)	Romania	+ 32' 33"
