= Joschka =

Joschka is a masculine given name. Notable people with the name include:

- Joschka Beck (born 1993), German cyclist
- Joschka Fischer (born 1948), German politician
- Joschka Knuth (born 1993), German politician
- Joschka Langenbrinck (born 1985), German politician
