= Erik Bergström Frisk =

Swedish cyclist

Personal information
- Born: 28 September 1999 (age 27) Stockholm, Sweden
- Height: 1.90 m (6 ft 3 in)
- Weight: 67 kg (148 lb)

Cycling career
- Sport: Cycling
- Discipline: Road
- Role: Rider
- Rider type: Climber

Professional teams
- 2018–2019: Memil–CCN Pro Cycling
- 2020–2021: Bike Aid
- 2022: CCN Factory Racing
- 2023: Shenzhen Xidesheng Cycling Team

Erik Bergström Frisk (born 28 September 1999) is a Swedish cyclist, who last rode for UCI Continental team Shenzhen Xidesheng Cycling Team. His brother Hannes is also a cyclist.

== Major results ==
2016
3rd Road race, National Junior Road Championships
2017
National Junior Road Championships

3rd Road race
3rd Time trial

2019
National Under-23 Road Championships

1st Road race
1st Time trial

National Road Championships

2nd Time trial
3rd Road race

4th Overall Tour of Qinghai Lake
10th Kalmar Grand Prix
10th Scandinavian Race Uppsala
2020
1st Young rider classification, Sibiu Cycling Tour
6th Overall Tour of Romania
