= 2016 UCI Road World Championships – Men's team time trial =

Men's team time trial
2016 UCI Road World Championships

Race details
- Dates: 9 October 2016
- Stages: 1
- Distance: 40 km (24.85 mi)
- Winning time: 42' 32.39"

Medalists
	Gold	(Belgium) Etixx–Quick-Step
	Silver	(United States) BMC Racing Team
	Bronze	(Australia) Orica–BikeExchange

The Men's team time trial of the 2016 UCI Road World Championships was a cycling event that took place on 9 October 2016 in Doha, Qatar. It was the 32nd edition of the championship, and the 5th since its reintroduction for trade teams in 2012. American team BMC Racing Team were the defending champions, having won in 2014 and 2015.

BMC Racing Team were unable to defend their title, as Etixx–Quick-Step – who won the world title as Omega Pharma–Quick-Step in 2012 and 2013 – regained the world title by 11.69 seconds. After missing the medals in 2015, Orica–BikeExchange finished up with the bronze medal, 25.43 seconds behind BMC Racing Team and 37.12 seconds in arrears of Etixx–Quick-Step.

== Course ==
The race started at the Lusail Sports Complex and finished at The Pearl Island, after a flat course of 40 kilometres (25 miles).

== UCI WorldTour teams boycott of team time trial ==
In August 2016 the AIGCP approved a motion for all UCI WorldTeams to boycott the time trial event, due to the UCI insisting that WorldTeams should compete in the event as a requirement of granting a WorldTeam licence without providing a participation allowance to teams, as is the case with other UCI World Tour races. It was reported that the UCI Professional Continental teams attending the AIGCP General Assembly also supported the motion.

On 13 September, the UCI released a statement, saying that the UCI and the AIGCP had agreed on a number of adjustments to the format, ensuring the participation of at least a number of UCI WorldTeams. Both organisations have agreed on a non-compulsory format, with no UCI WorldTour points to be awarded. Following this agreement, a number of UCI WorldTeams have announced their participation.

== Final classification ==
Rank	Team	Riders	Time
1	(Belgium) Etixx–Quick-Step	Bob Jungels (LUX); Marcel Kittel (GER); Yves Lampaert (BEL); Tony Martin (GER); Niki Terpstra (NED); Julien Vermote (BEL)	42' 32.39"
2	(United States) BMC Racing Team	Rohan Dennis (AUS); Stefan Küng (SUI); Daniel Oss (ITA); Taylor Phinney (USA); Manuel Quinziato (ITA); Joey Rosskopf (USA)	+ 11.69"
3	(Australia) Orica–BikeExchange	Luke Durbridge (AUS); Alex Edmondson (AUS); Michael Hepburn (AUS); Daryl Impey (RSA); Michael Matthews (AUS); Svein Tuft (CAN)	+ 37.12"
4	(United Kingdom) Team Sky	Vasil Kiryienka (BLR); Michał Kwiatkowski (POL); Nicolas Roche (IRL); Ben Swift (GBR); Geraint Thomas (GBR); Danny van Poppel (NED)	+ 54.28"
5	(Netherlands) LottoNL–Jumbo	Victor Campenaerts (BEL); Wilco Kelderman (NED); Tom Leezer (NED); Primož Roglič (SLO); Timo Roosen (NED); Jos van Emden (NED)	+ 54.79"
6	(Spain) Movistar Team	Andrey Amador (CRC); Jonathan Castroviejo (ESP); Alex Dowsett (GBR); Imanol Erviti (ESP); Nelson Oliveira (POR); Jasha Sütterlin (GER)	+ 1' 11.02"
7	(Germany) Team Giant–Alpecin	Søren Kragh Andersen (DEN); John Degenkolb (GER); Tom Dumoulin (NED); Chad Haga (USA); Georg Preidler (AUT); Ramon Sinkeldam (NED)	+ 1' 26.30"
8	(Russia) Team Katusha	Sven Erik Bystrøm (NOR); Alexander Kristoff (NOR); Vyacheslav Kuznetsov (RUS); Michael Mørkøv (DEN); Nils Politt (GER); Anton Vorobyev (RUS)	+ 2' 01.35"
9	(Kazakhstan) Astana	Dario Cataldo (ITA); Jakob Fuglsang (DEN); Andriy Hrivko (UKR); Tanel Kangert (EST); Alexey Lutsenko (KAZ); Gatis Smukulis (LAT)	+ 2' 21.46"
10	(Belgium) Verandas Willems	Sander Cordeel (BEL); Jan Ghyselinck (BEL); Aidis Kruopis (LTU); Christophe Prémont (BEL); Elias Van Breussegem (BEL); Stef Van Zummeren (BEL)	+ 3' 39.46"
11	(France) AG2R La Mondiale	Gediminas Bagdonas (LTU); Ben Gastauer (LUX); Alexis Gougeard (FRA); Patrick Gretsch (GER); Hugo Houle (CAN); Christophe Riblon (FRA)	+ 3' 43.40"
12	(Israel) Cycling Academy	Guillaume Boivin (CAN); Dan Craven (NAM); Mihkel Räim (EST); Guy Sagiv (ISR); Daniel Turek (CZE); Aviv Yechezkel (ISR)	+ 4' 24.83"
13	(Poland) CCC–Sprandi–Polkowice	Víctor de la Parte (ESP); Felix Großschartner (AUT); Nikolay Mihaylov (BUL); Łukasz Owsian (POL); Maciej Paterski (POL); Branislau Samoilau (BLR)	+ 4' 26.17"
14	(Ukraine) Kolss BDC Team	Andrii Bratashchuk (UKR); Vitaliy Buts (UKR); Mykhaylo Kononenko (UKR); Andriy Kulyk (UKR); Sergiy Lagkuti (UKR); Andriy Vasylyuk (UKR)	+ 5' 04.45"
15	(United Arab Emirates) Skydive Dubai–Al Ahli	Soufiane Haddi (MAR); Adil Jelloul (MAR); Francisco Mancebo (ESP); Tariq Obaid (UAE); Andrea Palini (ITA); Marlen Zmorka (UKR)	+ 5' 44.05"
16	(Kazakhstan) Vino 4ever SKO	Stepan Astafyev (KAZ); Zhandos Bizhigitov (KAZ); Yevgeniy Gidich (KAZ); Alexandr Shushemoin (KAZ); Alexey Voloshin (KAZ); Oleg Zemlyakov (KAZ)	+ 6' 31.21"
17	(Germany) Stradalli–Bike Aid	Joschka Beck (GER); Daniel Bichlmann (GER); Patrick Lechner (GER); Dominik Merseburg (GER); Timo Schafer (GER); Meron Teshome (ERI)	+ 7' 23.87"
