= Patrick Lechner =

German cyclist (born 1988)

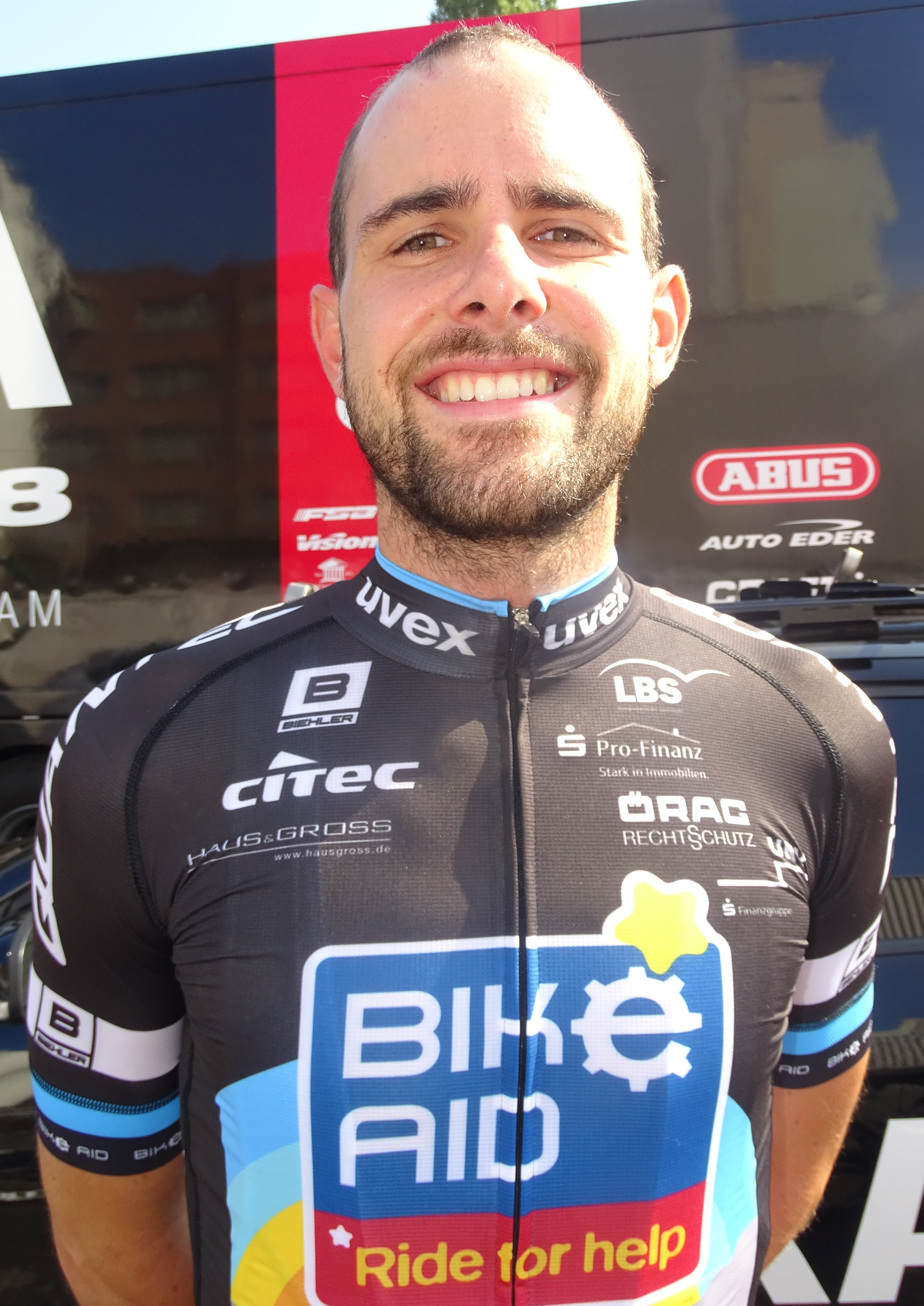
- Lechner in 2015

Personal information
- Full name: Patrick Lechner
- Born: 12 December 1988 (age 37)

Cycling career
- Sport: Cycling
- Current team: Gunsha–KMC
- Discipline: Road
- Role: Rider

Amateur teams
- 2004–2008: RV Viktoria Essingen
- 2009: RV Edelweiß Roschbach
- 2009: Team Möbel Ehrmann
- 2010–2012: BOOS–Bianchi meinradshop.de
- 2010–2012: Weiße Wölfe Merzig
- 2013: Bike Aid–Schwalbe Trier
- 2019: WiaWis RT powered by Dos Caballos
- 2020–: Gunsha–KMC

Professional team
- 2014–2018: Bike Aid–Ride for Help

Patrick Lechner (born 12 December 1988) is a German racing cyclist, who currently rides for German amateur team Gunsha–KMC. He rode in the men's team time trial at the 2016 UCI Road World Championships.
