= Timo Schäfer =

German cyclist

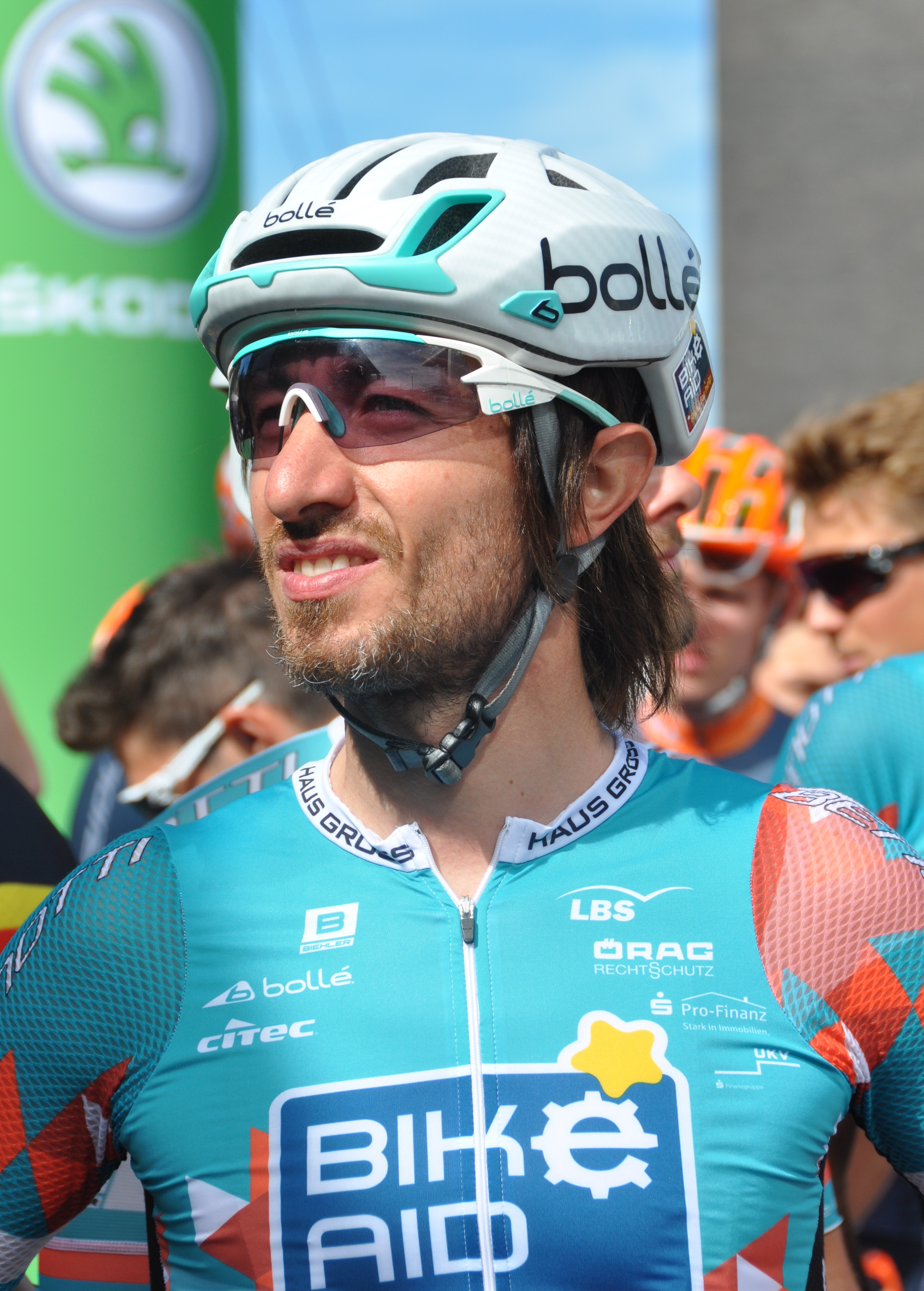
- Schäfer at the 2017 Rund um Köln

Personal information
- Full name: Timo Schäfer
- Born: 9 August 1982 (age 44)

Cycling career
- Sport: Cycling
- Current team: Bike Aid
- Discipline: Road
- Role: Rider (retired); Team manager

Amateur teams
- 2005–2006: RSC St. Wendel
- 2006: Coogee Saar Elite
- 2012–2013: Bike Aid

Professional team
- 2014–2019: Bike Aid–Ride for Help

Managerial team
- 2020–: Bike Aid

Timo Schäfer (born 9 August 1982) is a German former professional racing cyclist, who currently works as the team manager of UCI Continental team Bike Aid. He rode in the men's team time trial at the 2016 UCI Road World Championships.
