= Nikodemus Holler =

German bicycle racer

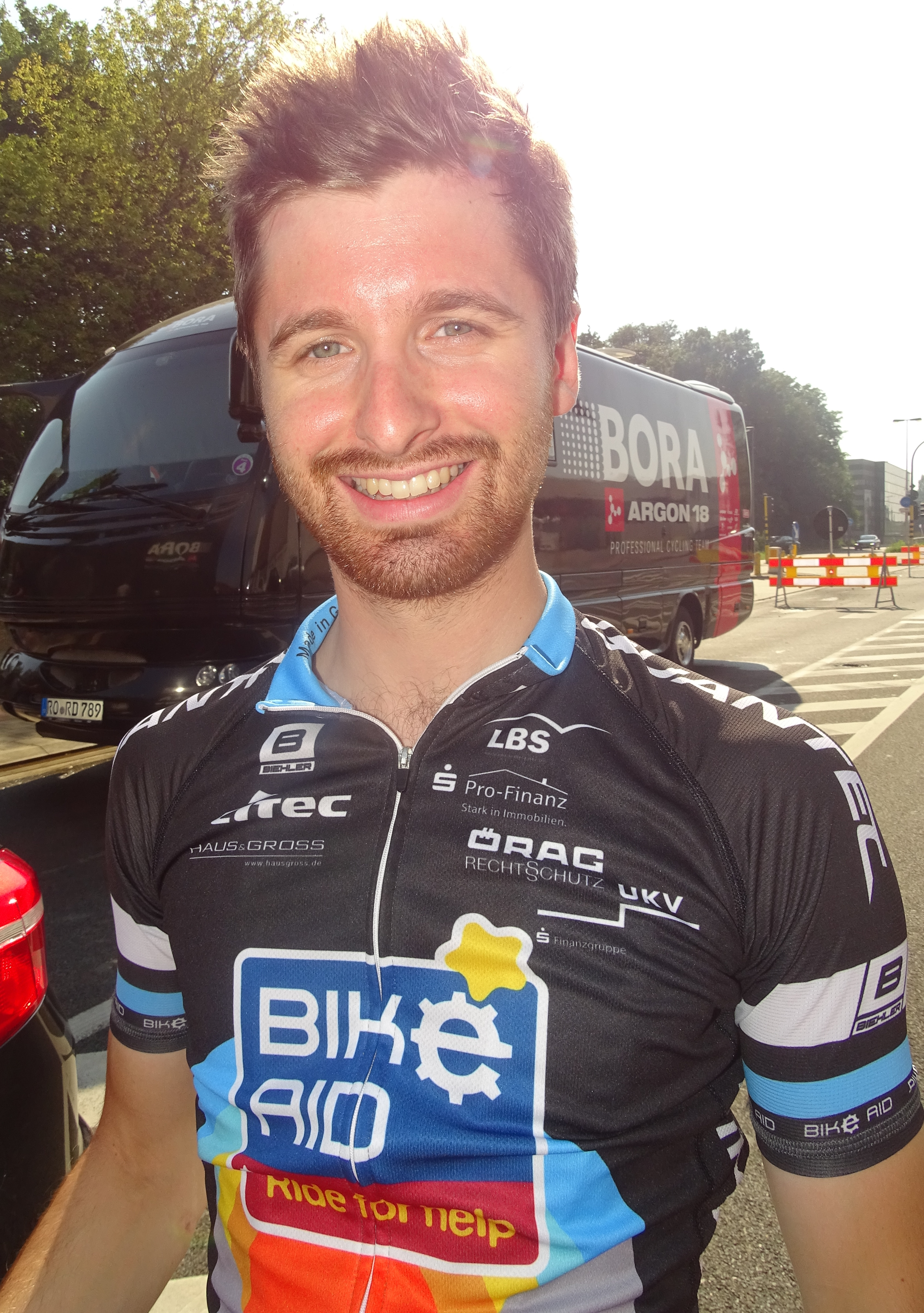
- Holler in 2015

Personal information
- Full name: Nikodemus Holler
- Born: 4 May 1991 (age 35) Mühlacker, Germany
- Weight: 58 kg (128 lb)

Cycling career
- Sport: Cycling
- Current team: Retired
- Discipline: Road
- Role: Rider

Amateur teams
- 2005–2011: RV Pfeil Magstadt
- 2009: Team Maisch Sportswear
- 2010: Corratec–RSC Komet Ludwigsburg
- 2011: Perspektivteam Baden-Württemberg

Professional teams
- 2012: Team Specialized Concept Store
- 2013: Thüringer Energie Team
- 2013: Argos–Shimano (stagiaire)
- 2014: Team Stuttgart
- 2015–2022: Bike Aid

Nikodemus Holler (born 4 May 1991) is a German former cyclist, who competed as a professional from 2012 to 2022.

In 2013, he was a stagiaire on UCI WorldTeam Argos–Shimano. In 2017, Holler won the UCI Africa Tour stage race Tour du Cameroun and finished third at La Tropicale Amissa Bongo, also a major African stage race.

== Major results ==
2012
2nd Road race, National Under-23 Road Championships
2015
9th Overall Tour du Maroc
2016
7th Overall Tour of China I
10th Overall Rás Tailteann

1st Mountains classification

2017
1st Overall Tour du Cameroun

1st Stage 2

3rd Overall La Tropicale Amissa Bongo
4th Overall Flèche du Sud
6th Overall Tour of Quanzhou Bay
2018
2nd Overall La Tropicale Amissa Bongo
2nd Overall Tour de Singkarak

1st Stage 8

3rd Overall Tour du Maroc
5th Overall Tour de Hongrie

1st Stages 4 & 5

8th Overall Rás Tailteann
2019
10th Grand Prix Gazipaşa
2020
1st Overall Tour of Thailand
1st Prologue Sibiu Cycling Tour
2nd Overall Tour of Romania
