= Alex Molenaar =

Dutch cyclist (born 1999)

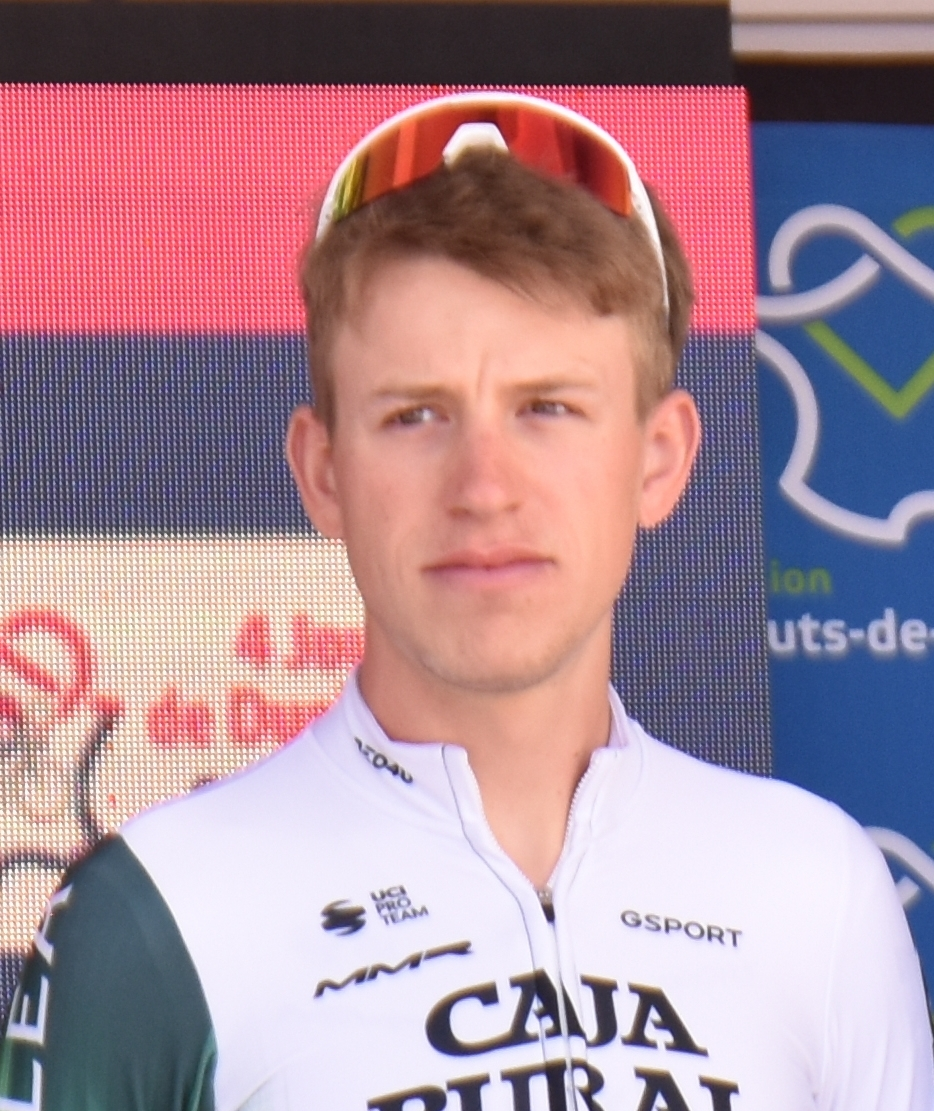
- Molenaar in 2025

Personal information
- Born: 13 July 1999 (age 27) Rotterdam, Netherlands
- Height: 1.84 m (6 ft 0 in)
- Weight: 63 kg (139 lb)

Cycling career
- Sport: Cycling
- Current team: Caja Rural–Seguros RGA
- Discipline: Road
- Role: Rider

Professional teams
- 2018: Destil–Parkhotel Valkenburg
- 2019: Monkey Town–à Bloc
- 2020–2022: Burgos BH
- 2023: Electro Hiper Europa
- 2024: Illes Balears Arabay Cycling
- 2025–: Caja Rural–Seguros RGA

Alex Molenaar (born 13 July 1999) is a Dutch racing cyclist, who currently rides for UCI ProTeam Caja Rural–Seguros RGA. He won the Tour of Romania in 2019. In October 2020, he was named in the startlist for the 2020 Vuelta a España.

== Major results ==
2017
1st Overall SPIE Internationale Juniorendriedaagse
5th Menen–Kemmel–Menen
8th Overall GP Général Patton
2018
4th Overall Tour of Szeklerland

1st Young rider classification

2019
1st Overall Tour of Romania

1st Young rider classification

1st Stage 8 Tour of Qinghai Lake
1st Stage 2 Oberösterreichrundfahrt
1st Young rider classification, GP Beiras e Serra da Estrela
2020
Combativity award Stage 10 Vuelta a España
2022
1st Stage 8 Tour de Langkawi
2023
3rd Overall Vuelta a Castilla y León
3rd Overall Volta ao Alentejo
2024
2nd Overall GP Beiras e Serra da Estrela

1st Points classification
1st Stage 3

2025
2nd GP Miguel Induráin
4th Clásica Terres de l'Ebre
6th Overall CRO Race
10th Grand Prix La Marseillaise
2026
3rd Grand Prix La Marseillaise
7th Trofeo Matteotti
10th Brabantse Pijl
Tour de France

Held after Stage 2

=== Grand Tour general classification results timeline ===
Grand Tour	2020	2021	2022	2023	2024	2025	2026
Giro d'Italia	—	—	—	—	—	—	—
Tour de France	—	—	—	—	—	—	IP
Vuelta a España	128	—	—	—	—	70	—

Legend
—	Did not compete
DNF	Did not finish
