= Joschka Beck =

German cyclist

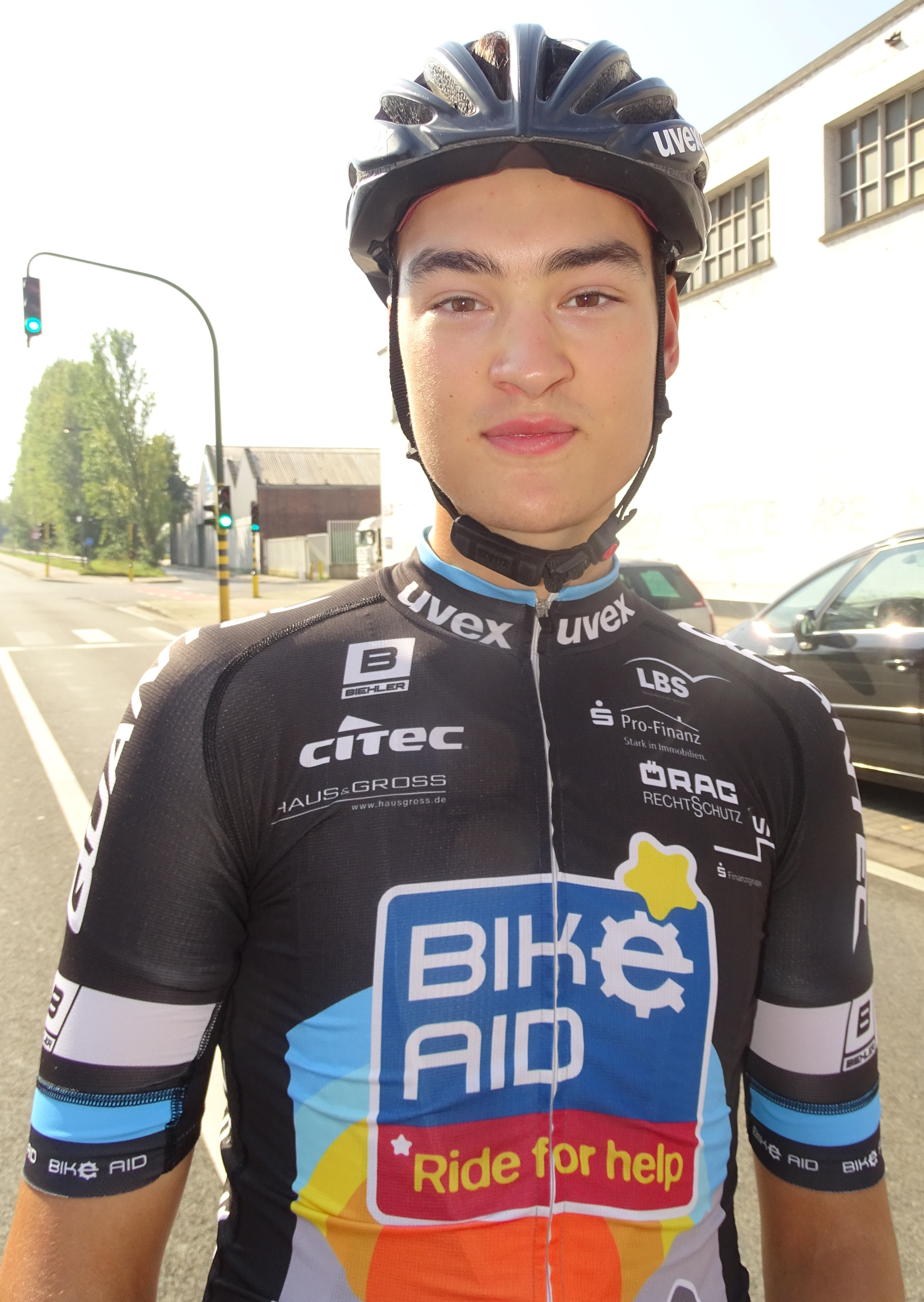
- Beck in 2015

Personal information
- Full name: Joschka Beck
- Born: 22 March 1993 (age 33)

Cycling career
- Sport: Cycling
- Discipline: Road
- Role: Rider

Amateur teams
- 2010–2011: Fachklinik Dr. Herzog–SV Sparkassenversicherung–Hessen
- 2010–2014: RV Germania Rockenberg
- 2012: Espoirs Robert Lange
- 2013: Team Artiva
- 2014: Team Biketempel–Fachklinik Dr. Herzog
- 2018: Team Erdinger Alkoholfrei
- 2018–2019: RC Silber-Pils 03 Bellheim/Pfalz

Professional team
- 2015–2017: Bike Aid

Joschka Beck (born 22 March 1993) is a German racing cyclist, who last rode for German amateur team RC Silber-Pils 03 Bellheim/Pfalz. He finished ninth at the 2014 Tobago Cycling Classic, and he rode in the men's team time trial at the 2016 UCI Road World Championships.
