= 2025 CRO Race =

2025 UCI Europe Tour

Race details
- Dates: 30 September – 5 October 2025
- Stages: 6
- Distance: 861.5 km (535.3 mi)
- Winning time: 19h 45' 16"

Results
Jersey awarded to the overall winner	Winner	Brandon McNulty (USA)	(UAE Team Emirates XRG)
	Second	Edoardo Zambanini (ITA)	(Team Bahrain Victorious)
	Third	Michał Kwiatkowski (POL)	(INEOS Grenadiers)
Jersey awarded to the points classification winner	Points	Paul Magnier (FRA)	(Soudal–Quick-Step)
Jersey awarded to the mountains classification winner	Mountains	Casper van der Woude (NED)	(Metec–Solarwatt p/b Mantel)
Jersey awarded to the young rider classification winner	Young rider	Jakob Omrzel (SVN)	(Team Bahrain Victorious)
	Team	Team Bahrain Victorious	

The 2025 CRO Race was a road cycling stage race in Croatia held between 30 September and 5 October 2025. It was the tenth edition of the Tour of Croatia since its revival in 2015 and the sixth under the CRO Race name. The race is rated as a category 2.1 event on the 2025 UCI Europe Tour calendar.

== Teams ==
Seven UCI WorldTeams, six UCI ProTeams, and seven UCI Continental teams made up the 20 teams that participated in the race.

UCI WorldTeams

- Arkéa–B&B Hotels
- INEOS Grenadiers
- Red Bull–Bora–Hansgrohe
- Soudal–Quick-Step
- Team Bahrain Victorious
- Team Jayco–AlUla
- UAE Team Emirates XRG

UCI ProTeams

- Caja Rural–Seguros RGA
- Equipo Kern Pharma
- Israel–Premier Tech
- Team Polti VisitMalta
- Team Solution Tech–Vini Fantini

UCI Continental Teams

- Adria Mobil
- ATT Investments
- Metec–Solarwatt p/b Mantel
- Pogi Team Gusto Ljubljana
- Run & Race–Wibatech
- Team United Shipping
- Voster ATS Team

== Route ==
Stage characteristics and winners
Stage	Date	Course	Distance	Type	Winner
1	30 September	Split to Sinj	162.5 km (101.0 mi)	Hilly stage	Paul Magnier (FRA)
2	1 October	Biograd na Moru to ~~Novalja~~ Jovići	~~114.5 km (71.1 mi)~~ 51 km (32 mi) (Note: Original finish of the stage was in Novalja but due to strong wind at the section across Pag Bridge the finish point was moved to Jovići at km 51.)	Flat stage	Paul Magnier (FRA)
3	2 October	Gospić to Rijeka	150.5 km (93.5 mi)	Hilly stage	Paul Magnier (FRA)
4	3 October	Krk to Labin	190.5 km (118.4 mi)	Mountain stage	Brandon McNulty (USA)
5	4 October	Karlovac to Sveta Nedelja	150.5 km (93.5 mi)	Hilly stage	Paul Magnier (FRA)
6	5 October	Samobor to Zagreb	156.5 km (97.2 mi)	Flat stage	Oded Kogut (ISR)
Total			~~925 km (575 mi)~~ 861.5 km (535.3 mi)		

== Stages ==
=== Stage 1 ===
30 September 2025 — Split to Sinj, 162.5 km (101.0 mi)

Stage 1 result
Rank	Rider	Team	Time
1	Paul Magnier (FRA)	Soudal–Quick-Step	3h 45' 14"
2	Danny van Poppel (NED)	Red Bull–Bora–Hansgrohe	+ 0"
3	Oded Kogut (ISR)	Israel–Premier Tech	+ 0"
4	Giovanni Lonardi (ITA)	Team Polti VisitMalta	+ 0"
5	Ben Turner (GBR)	INEOS Grenadiers	+ 0"
6	Rui Oliveira (POR)	UAE Team Emirates XRG	+ 0"
7	Žak Eržen (SLO)	Team Bahrain Victorious	+ 0"
8	Robert Donaldson (GBR)	Team Jayco–AlUla	+ 0"
9	Tommaso Nencini (ITA)	Team Solution Tech–Vini Fantini	+ 0"
10	Nicolas Gojković (CRO)	Pogi Team Gusto Ljubljana	+ 0"

General classification after Stage 1
Rank	Rider	Team	Time
1	Paul Magnier (FRA)	Soudal–Quick-Step	3h 45' 04"
2	Diego Uriarte (ESP)	Equipo Kern Pharma	+ 1"
3	Danny van Poppel (NED)	Red Bull–Bora–Hansgrohe	+ 4"
4	Javier Ibáñez (ESP)	Caja Rural–Seguros RGA	+ 4"
5	Oded Kogut (ISR)	Israel–Premier Tech	+ 6"
6	Mateusz Kostański (POL)	Voster ATS Team	+ 9"
7	Giovanni Lonardi (ITA)	Team Polti VisitMalta	+ 10"
8	Ben Turner (GBR)	INEOS Grenadiers	+ 10"
9	Rui Oliveira (POR)	UAE Team Emirates XRG	+ 10"
10	Žak Eržen (SLO)	Team Bahrain Victorious	+ 10"

=== Stage 2 ===
1 October 2025 — Biograd na Moru to Jovići, 51 km (32 mi)

Stage 2 result
Rank	Rider	Team	Time
1	Paul Magnier (FRA)	Soudal–Quick-Step	1h 04' 55"
2	Edoardo Zambanini (ITA)	Team Bahrain Victorious	+ 0"
3	Ben Turner (GBR)	INEOS Grenadiers	+ 0"
4	Danny van Poppel (NED)	Red Bull–Bora–Hansgrohe	+ 0"
5	Floris Van Tricht (BEL)	Israel–Premier Tech	+ 0"
6	Rui Oliveira (POR)	UAE Team Emirates XRG	+ 0"
7	Robert Donaldson (GBR)	Team Jayco–AlUla	+ 0"
8	Giovanni Lonardi (ITA)	Team Polti VisitMalta	+ 0"
9	Arnaud Tissières (SUI)	Team Solution Tech–Vini Fantini	+ 0"
10	Brandon McNulty (USA)	UAE Team Emirates XRG	+ 0"

General classification after Stage 2
Rank	Rider	Team	Time
1	Paul Magnier (FRA)	Soudal–Quick-Step	3h 49' 46"
2	Diego Uriarte (ESP)	Equipo Kern Pharma	+ 11"
3	Danny van Poppel (NED)	Red Bull–Bora–Hansgrohe	+ 14"
4	Edoardo Zambanini (ITA)	Team Bahrain Victorious	+ 14"
5	Javier Ibáñez (ESP)	Caja Rural–Seguros RGA	+ 14"
6	Ben Turner (GBR)	INEOS Grenadiers	+ 16"
7	Alex Molenaar (NED)	Caja Rural–Seguros RGA	+ 17"
8	Artur Sowiński (POL)	Run & Race–Wibatech	+ 18"
9	Mateusz Kostański (POL)	Voster ATS Team	+ 19"
10	Dan Andrej Tomšič (SLO)	Pogi Team Gusto Ljubljana	+ 19"

=== Stage 3 ===
2 October 2025 — Gospić to Rijeka, 105.5 km (65.6 mi)

Stage 3 result
Rank	Rider	Team	Time
1	Paul Magnier (FRA)	Soudal–Quick-Step	3h 26' 59"
2	Ben Turner (GBR)	INEOS Grenadiers	+ 0"
3	Oded Kogut (ISR)	Israel–Premier Tech	+ 0"
4	Giovanni Lonardi (ITA)	Team Polti VisitMalta	+ 0"
5	Kim Heiduk (GER)	INEOS Grenadiers	+ 0"
6	Rui Oliveira (POR)	UAE Team Emirates XRG	+ 0"
7	Mihajlo Stolić (SRB)	Team United Shipping	+ 0"
8	Marceli Bogusławski (POL)	ATT Investments	+ 0"
9	Robert Donaldson (GBR)	Team Jayco–AlUla	+ 0"
10	Pau Miquel (ESP)	Equipo Kern Pharma	+ 0"

General classification after Stage 3
Rank	Rider	Team	Time
1	Paul Magnier (FRA)	Soudal–Quick-Step	8h 16' 38"
2	Ben Turner (GBR)	INEOS Grenadiers	+ 20"
3	Baptiste Poulard (FRA)	Arkéa–B&B Hotels	+ 21"
4	Diego Uriarte (ESP)	Equipo Kern Pharma	+ 21"
5	Danny van Poppel (NED)	Red Bull–Bora–Hansgrohe	+ 24"
6	Edoardo Zambanini (ITA)	Team Bahrain Victorious	+ 24"
7	Alex Molenaar (NED)	Caja Rural–Seguros RGA	+ 27"
8	Giovanni Lonardi (ITA)	Team Polti VisitMalta	+ 30"
9	Rui Oliveira (POR)	UAE Team Emirates XRG	+ 30"
10	Robert Donaldson (GBR)	Team Jayco–AlUla	+ 30"

=== Stage 4 ===
3 October 2025 — Krk to Labin, 190.5 km (118.4 mi)

Stage 4 result
Rank	Rider	Team	Time
1	Brandon McNulty (USA)	UAE Team Emirates XRG	4h 47' 57"
2	Edoardo Zambanini (ITA)	Team Bahrain Victorious	+ 1' 40"
3	Michał Kwiatkowski (POL)	INEOS Grenadiers	+ 1' 40"
4	Joel Nicolau (ESP)	Caja Rural–Seguros RGA	+ 1' 45"
5	Magnus Sheffield (USA)	INEOS Grenadiers	+ 2' 16"
6	Jakob Omrzel (SLO)	Team Bahrain Victorious	+ 2' 21"
7	Filippo Zana (ITA)	Team Jayco–AlUla	+ 2' 21"
8	Piotr Pękala (POL)	ATT Investments	+ 2' 21"
9	Alexander Hajek (AUT)	Red Bull–Bora–Hansgrohe	+ 2' 21"
10	Alex Molenaar (NED)	Caja Rural–Seguros RGA	+ 2' 21"

General classification after Stage 4
Rank	Rider	Team	Time
1	Brandon McNulty (USA)	UAE Team Emirates XRG	13h 04' 52"
2	Edoardo Zambanini (ITA)	Team Bahrain Victorious	+ 1' 39"
3	Michał Kwiatkowski (POL)	INEOS Grenadiers	+ 1' 49"
4	Joel Nicolau (ESP)	Caja Rural–Seguros RGA	+ 1' 58"
5	Magnus Sheffield (USA)	INEOS Grenadiers	+ 2' 29"
6	Alex Molenaar (NED)	Caja Rural–Seguros RGA	+ 2' 31"
7	Jakob Omrzel (SLO)	Team Bahrain Victorious	+ 2' 34"
8	Piotr Pękala (POL)	ATT Investments	+ 2' 34"
9	Filippo Zana (ITA)	Team Jayco–AlUla	+ 2' 34"
10	Alexander Hajek (AUT)	Red Bull–Bora–Hansgrohe	+ 2' 34"

=== Stage 5 ===
4 October 2025 — Karlovac to Sveta Nedelja, 150.5 km (93.5 mi)

Stage 5 result
Rank	Rider	Team	Time
1	Paul Magnier (FRA)	Soudal–Quick-Step	3h 29' 48"
2	Rui Oliveira (POR)	UAE Team Emirates XRG	+ 0"
3	Pau Miquel (ESP)	Equipo Kern Pharma	+ 0"
4	Edoardo Zambanini (ITA)	Team Bahrain Victorious	+ 0"
5	Alex Molenaar (NED)	Caja Rural–Seguros RGA	+ 0"
6	Pepijn Reinderink (NED)	Soudal–Quick-Step	+ 0"
7	Pier-André Côté (CAN)	Israel–Premier Tech	+ 0"
8	Alessandro Tonelli (ITA)	Team Polti VisitMalta	+ 0"
9	Floris Van Tricht (BEL)	Israel–Premier Tech	+ 0"
10	Antoine Huby (FRA)	Soudal–Quick-Step	+ 0"

General classification after Stage 5
Rank	Rider	Team	Time
1	Brandon McNulty (USA)	UAE Team Emirates XRG	16h 34' 40"
2	Edoardo Zambanini (ITA)	Team Bahrain Victorious	+ 1' 39"
3	Michał Kwiatkowski (POL)	INEOS Grenadiers	+ 1' 49"
4	Joel Nicolau (ESP)	Caja Rural–Seguros RGA	+ 1' 58"
5	Magnus Sheffield (USA)	INEOS Grenadiers	+ 2' 29"
6	Alex Molenaar (NED)	Caja Rural–Seguros RGA	+ 2' 31"
7	Jakob Omrzel (SLO)	Team Bahrain Victorious	+ 2' 34"
8	Piotr Pękala (POL)	ATT Investments	+ 2' 34"
9	Filippo Zana (ITA)	Team Jayco–AlUla	+ 2' 34"
10	Alexander Hajek (AUT)	Red Bull–Bora–Hansgrohe	+ 2' 34"

=== Stage 6 ===
5 October 2025 — Samobor to Zagreb, 156.5 km (97.2 mi)

Stage 6 result
Rank	Rider	Team	Time
1	Oded Kogut (ISR)	Israel–Premier Tech	3h 10' 36"
2	Paul Magnier (FRA)	Soudal–Quick-Step	+ 0"
3	Danny van Poppel (NED)	Red Bull–Bora–Hansgrohe	+ 0"
4	Ben Turner (GBR)	INEOS Grenadiers	+ 0"
5	Radoslaw Fratczak (POL)	Voster ATS Team	+ 0"
6	Roy Hoogendoorn (NED)	Metec–Solarwatt p/b Mantel	+ 0"
7	Nicolas Gojković (CRO)	Pogi Team Gusto Ljubljana	+ 0"
8	Campbell Stewart (NZL)	Team Jayco–AlUla	+ 0"
9	Žak Eržen (SLO)	Team Bahrain Victorious	+ 0"
10	Pau Miquel (ESP)	Equipo Kern Pharma	+ 0"

General classification after Stage 6
Rank	Rider	Team	Time
1	Brandon McNulty (USA)	UAE Team Emirates XRG	19h 45' 16"
2	Edoardo Zambanini (ITA)	Team Bahrain Victorious	+ 1' 39"
3	Michał Kwiatkowski (POL)	INEOS Grenadiers	+ 1' 49"
4	Joel Nicolau (ESP)	Caja Rural–Seguros RGA	+ 1' 58"
5	Magnus Sheffield (USA)	INEOS Grenadiers	+ 2' 29"
6	Alex Molenaar (NED)	Caja Rural–Seguros RGA	+ 2' 31"
7	Jakob Omrzel (SLO)	Team Bahrain Victorious	+ 2' 34"
8	Piotr Pękala (POL)	ATT Investments	+ 2' 34"
9	Filippo Zana (ITA)	Team Jayco–AlUla	+ 2' 34"
10	Alexander Hajek (AUT)	Red Bull–Bora–Hansgrohe	+ 2' 34"

== Classification leadership table ==
In the 2025 CRO Race, four different jerseys were awarded. The general classification was calculated by adding each cyclist's finishing times on each stage, and applying time bonuses for the first three riders at intermediate sprints (three seconds to first, two seconds to second, and one second to third) and at the finish of mass-start stages; these were awarded to the first three finishers on all stages: the stage winner won a ten-second bonus, with six and four seconds for the second and third riders, respectively. The leader of the classification received a red jersey; it was considered the most important of the 2025 CRO Race, and the winner of the classification was considered the winner of the race.

Points for the mountains classification
Position	1	2	3	4	5	6	7	8
Points for Hors-category	20	15	10	8	6	4	3	2
Points for Category 1	12	8	6	4	2	0		
Points for Category 2	6	4	2	0				
Points for Category 3	3	2	1	0				

Additionally, there was a points classification, for which the leader was awarded a blue jersey. In the points classification, cyclists received points for finishing in the top 15 of each stage. For winning a stage, a rider earned 25 points, with 20 for second, 16 for third, 14 for fourth, 12 for fifth, 10 for sixth, and a point fewer per place down to 1 point for 15th place. Points towards the classification could also be won on a 5–3–1 scale for the first three riders, respectively, at intermediate sprint points during each stage; these intermediate sprints also offered bonus seconds towards the general classification as noted above.

There was also a mountains classification, the leadership of which was marked by a green jersey. In the mountains classification, points towards the classification were won by reaching the summit of a climb before other cyclists. Each climb was marked as either hors, first, second, or third-category, with more points available for the higher-categorized climbs.

The fourth and final jersey represented the young rider classification, and its leadership was marked by a white jersey. This was decided in the same way as the general classification, but only riders born after 1 January 2001 (i.e., under 23 years of age at the beginning of the year) were eligible to be ranked in the classification. There was also a team classification, in which the times of the best three cyclists per team on each stage were added together; the leading team at the end of the race was the team with the lowest total time.

Classification leadership by stage
Stage	Winner	General classification	Points classification	Mountains classification	Young rider classification	Team classification
1	Paul Magnier	Paul Magnier	Paul Magnier	Michal Schuran	Paul Magnier	Israel–Premier Tech
2	Paul Magnier	Paul Magnier	Paul Magnier	Michal Schuran	Paul Magnier	INEOS Grenadiers
3	Paul Magnier	Paul Magnier	Paul Magnier	Casper van der Woude	Paul Magnier	INEOS Grenadiers
4	Brandon McNulty	Brandon McNulty	Paul Magnier	Brandon McNulty	Jakob Omrzel	Team Bahrain Victorious
5	Paul Magnier	Brandon McNulty	Paul Magnier	Casper van der Woude	Jakob Omrzel	Team Bahrain Victorious
6	Oded Kogut	Brandon McNulty	Paul Magnier	Casper van der Woude	Jakob Omrzel	Team Bahrain Victorious
Final		Brandon McNulty	Paul Magnier	Casper van der Woude	Jakob Omrzel	Team Bahrain Victorious

- On stage 2, Oded Kogut, who was second in the points classification, wore the blue jersey, and Žak Eržen, who was second in the young rider classification, wore the white jersey, because first-placed Paul Magnier wore the red jersey as the leader of the general classification.
- On stage 3, Ben Turner, who was second in the points classification, wore the blue jersey, and Dan Andrej Tomšić, who was second in the young rider classification, wore the white jersey, because first-placed Paul Magnier wore the red jersey as the leader of the general classification.
- On stage 4, Ben Turner, who was second in the points classification, wore the blue jersey, and Baptiste Poulard, who was second in the young rider classification, wore the white jersey, because first-placed Paul Magnier wore the red jersey as the leader of the general classification.
- On stage 5, Swann Gloux, who was second in the mountains classification, wore the green jersey, because first-placed Brandon McNulty wore the red jersey as the leader of the general classification.

== Classification standings ==
Legend
Denotes the leader of the general classification	Denotes the leader of the mountains classification
Denotes the leader of the points classification	Denotes the leader of the young rider classification

=== General classification ===
Final general classification (1–10)
Rank	Rider	Team	Time
1	Brandon McNulty (USA)	UAE Team Emirates XRG	19h 46' 16"
2	Edoardo Zambanini (ITA)	Team Bahrain Victorious	+ 1' 39"
3	Michał Kwiatkowski (POL)	INEOS Grenadiers	+ 1' 49"
4	Joel Nicolau (ESP)	Caja Rural–Seguros RGA	+ 1' 58"
5	Magnus Sheffield (USA)	INEOS Grenadiers	+ 2' 29"
6	Alex Molenaar (NED)	Caja Rural–Seguros RGA	+ 2' 31"
7	Jakob Omrzel (SLO)	Team Bahrain Victorious	+ 2' 34"
8	Piotr Pękala (POL)	ATT Investments	+ 2' 34"
9	Filippo Zana (ITA)	Team Jayco–AlUla	+ 2' 34"
10	Alexander Hajek (AUT)	Red Bull–Bora–Hansgrohe	+ 2' 34"

=== Points classification ===
Final points classification (1–10)
Rank	Rider	Team	Points
1	Paul Magnier (FRA)	Soudal–Quick-Step	120
2	Ben Turner (GBR)	INEOS Grenadiers	62
3	Oded Kogut (ISR)	Israel–Premier Tech	57
4	Edoardo Zambanini (ITA)	Team Bahrain Victorious	57
5	Danny van Poppel (NED)	Red Bull–Bora–Hansgrohe	51
6	Rui Oliveira (POR)	UAE Team Emirates XRG	50
7	Brandon McNulty (USA)	UAE Team Emirates XRG	36
8	Martin Voltr (CZE)	ATT Investments	29
9	Alex Molenaar (NED)	Caja Rural–Seguros RGA	29
10	Pau Miquel (ESP)	Equipo Kern Pharma	28

=== Mountains classification ===
Final mountains classification (1–10)
Rank	Rider	Team	Points
1	Casper van der Woude (NED)	Metec–Solarwatt p/b Mantel	24
2	Brandon McNulty (USA)	UAE Team Emirates XRG	21
3	Swann Gloux (FRA)	Arkéa–B&B Hotels	20
4	Javier Beltran de Salazar (ESP)	Caja Rural–Seguros RGA	15
5	Martin Voltr (CZE)	ATT Investments	13
6	Rune Herregodts (BEL)	UAE Team Emirates XRG	10
7	Michal Schuran (CZE)	Team United Shipping	9
8	Magnus Sheffield (USA)	INEOS Grenadiers	8
9	Edoardo Zambanini (ITA)	Team Bahrain Victorious	8
10	Jakob Omrzel (SLO)	Team Bahrain Victorious	8

=== Young rider classification ===
Final young rider classification (1–10)
Rank	Rider	Team	Time
1	Jakob Omrzel (SLO)	Team Bahrain Victorious	19h 47' 50"
2	Alexander Hajek (AUT)	Red Bull–Bora–Hansgrohe	+ 0"
3	Emil Herzog (AUT)	Red Bull–Bora–Hansgrohe	+ 9"
4	Mateo Ramírez (ECU)	UAE Team Emirates XRG	+ 6' 23"
5	Jean Fayolle (FRA)	Arkéa–B&B Hotels	+ 8' 39"
6	Max van der Meulen (NED)	Team Bahrain Victorious	+ 11' 38"
7	Andrea Bruno (ITA)	VF Group–Bardiani–CSF–Faizanè	+ 19'03"
8	Vlad Van Mechelen (BEL)	Team Bahrain Victorious	+ 19'42"
9	Luca Verrando (ITA)	Team Solution Tech–Vini Fantini	+ 19'55"
10	Lars Vanden Heed (BEL)	Soudal–Quick-Step	+ 19'55"

=== Team classification ===
Final team classification (1–10)
Rank	Team	Time
1	Team Bahrain Victorious	59h 24' 02"
2	(United Arab Emirates) UAE Team Emirates XRG	+ 1' 24"
3	(Spain) Caja Rural–Seguros RGA	+ 1' 42"
4	(United Kingdom) INEOS Grenadiers	+ 2' 04"
5	(Italy) Team Polti VisitMalta	+ 7' 12"
6	(Spain) Equipo Kern Pharma	+ 8' 01"
7	Israel–Premier Tech	+ 8' 25"
8	(Germany) Red Bull–Bora–Hansgrohe	+ 11' 10"
9	(France) Arkéa–B&B Hotels	+ 18' 58"
10	(Belgium) Soudal–Quick-Step	+ 23' 56"
