= Yannick Mayer =

German cyclist (born 1991)

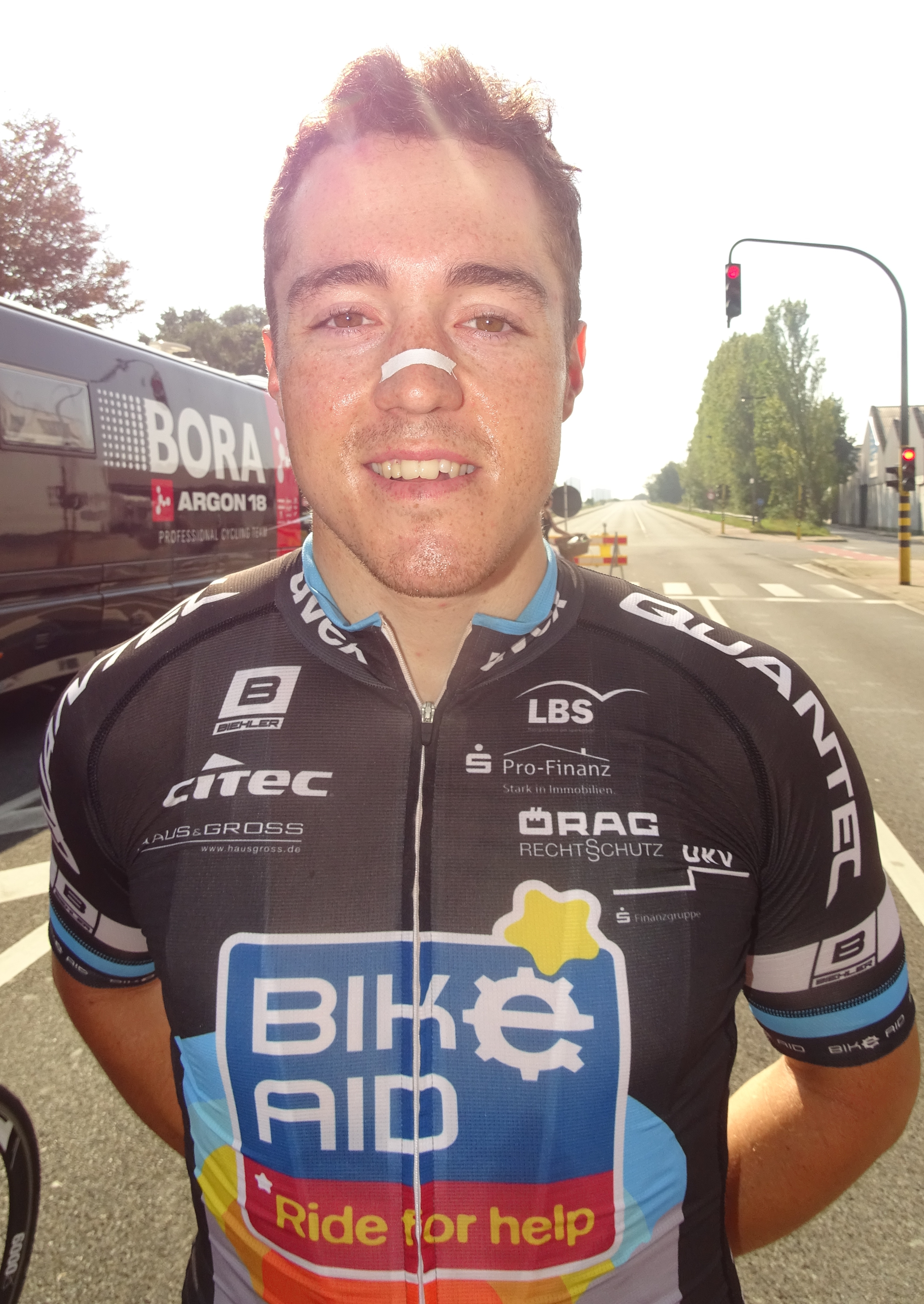
- Mayer in 2015

Personal information
- Full name: Yannick Mayer
- Born: 15 February 1991 (age 35) Mosbach, Germany

Cycling career
- Sport: Cycling
- Current team: Veloclub Ratisbona Regensburg (road); Team Beacon (cyclo-cross)
- Disciplines: Road; Cyclo-cross
- Role: Rider

Amateur teams
- 2005–2007: VFR Waldkatzenbach
- 2008–2009: RSG Heilbronn
- 2009: Team Maisch Sportswear
- 2012: Team Roadsign–Brothers Bikes
- 2013: Baier Landshut
- 2013: BIKEsportworld–Bad Krozingen
- 2018–: Veloclub Ratisbona Regensburg
- 2019: Gunsha–KMC (off-road)
- 2020: SW SR (cyclo-cross)
- 2021–: Team Beacon (cyclo-cross)

Professional teams
- 2010: Team Heizomat Mapei
- 2011–2012: Team NSP
- 2014–2015: Bike Aid–Ride for Help
- 2016: Veranclassic–Ago
- 2017: 0711 / Cycling

Yannick Mayer (born 15 February 1991 in Mosbach) is a German cyclist, who currently competes for German amateur teams Veloclub Ratisbona Regensburg in road cycling and Team Beacon in cyclo-cross.

== Major results ==
2011
1st Stage 2 Ronde de l'Isard
2013
2nd Tour de Delta
2015
1st Stage 4 Vuelta a la Independencia Nacional
2019
7th Visegrad 4 Bicycle Race – GP Polski
