= Lucas Carstensen =

German cyclist (born 1994)

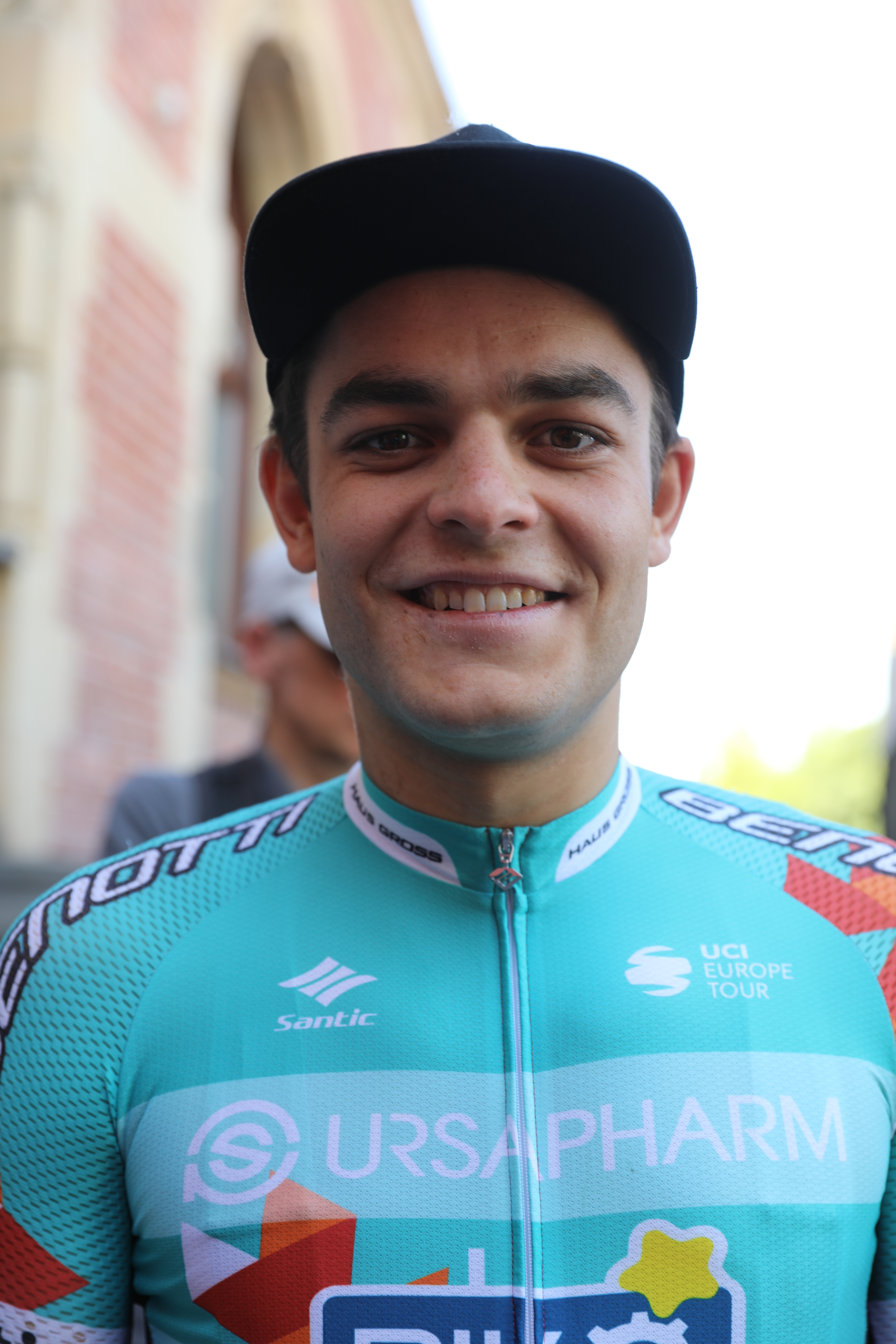
- Carstensen in 2019

Personal information
- Full name: Lucas Carstensen
- Born: 16 June 1994 (age 32) Hamburg, Germany
- Height: 1.75 m (5 ft 9 in)
- Weight: 69 kg (152 lb)

Cycling career
- Sport: Cycling
- Current team: Kinan Racing Team
- Discipline: Road
- Role: Rider
- Rider type: Sprinter

Amateur teams
- 2008–2014: Harburger RG
- 2011–2012: Stevens U19 Team Hamburg
- 2014: Oovis.de
- 2014: Bike Aid–Ride for Help (stagiaire)
- 2015–2016: Berliner TSC
- 2015–2016: RG KED–Stevens Rad Team Berlin
- 2017: Harburger RG
- 2017: Team Embrace the World

Professional teams
- 2018–2022: Bike Aid
- 2023–2024: Roojai Online Insurance
- 2025: Team Storck–Metropol Cycling
- 2026-: Kinan Racing Team

Lucas Carstensen (born 16 June 1994) is a German professional racing cyclist, who currently rides for UCI Continental team Kinan Racing Team.

== Career ==
Born in Hamburg, Carstensen was the leader during the 2017 Tour de Tunisie. He finished the event winning the points classification. Carstensen also won three stages and the points classification at the 2017 Tour du Senegal, and a stage at the 2017 Tour of Xingtai.

Carstensen won the first stage at the 2018 La Tropicale Amissa Bongo. At the finish he defeated Adrien Petit. He retained the race leader's yellow jersey on the second day.

== Major results ==
2017
1st Stage 3 Tour of Xingtai
3rd Overall Tour du Sénégal

1st Points classification
1st Stages 1, 6 & 8

3rd Sparkassen Giro Bochum
5th Overall Tour de Tunisie

1st Points classification
1st Stage 2

8th GP Al Massira Les Challenges de la Marche Verte
2018
1st Stage 1 Tropicale Amissa Bongo
1st Stage 2 Tour of Hainan
1st Stage 5 Rás Tailteann
7th Overall Belgrade Banjaluka
10th Münsterland Giro
2019
1st Grand Prix Alanya
2020
1st Stage 2 Tour of Romania
8th Overall Tour of Thailand

1st Stages 2 & 5

2021
4th Overall Tour of Thailand

1st Points classification
1st Stages 1, 2, 4 & 5

2022
1st Stage 1 Tour of Romania
1st Stage 2 Tour of Azerbaijan (Iran)
2023
1st Overall Tour of Binzhou

1st Points classification
1st Stage 1

1st Stage 5 New Zealand Cycle Classic
1st Stage 5 Tour of Sharjah
6th Overall Tour of Taihu Lake
2024
1st Bueng Si Fai International Road Race
1st Stage 1 Tour of Thailand
2025
Tour du Cameroun

1st Stages 2, 3, 9 & 10
1st Points classification

2026
Tour de Taiwan

1st Stage 5

Tour of Japan

1st Stage 8
