= Dominik Merseburg =

German cyclist

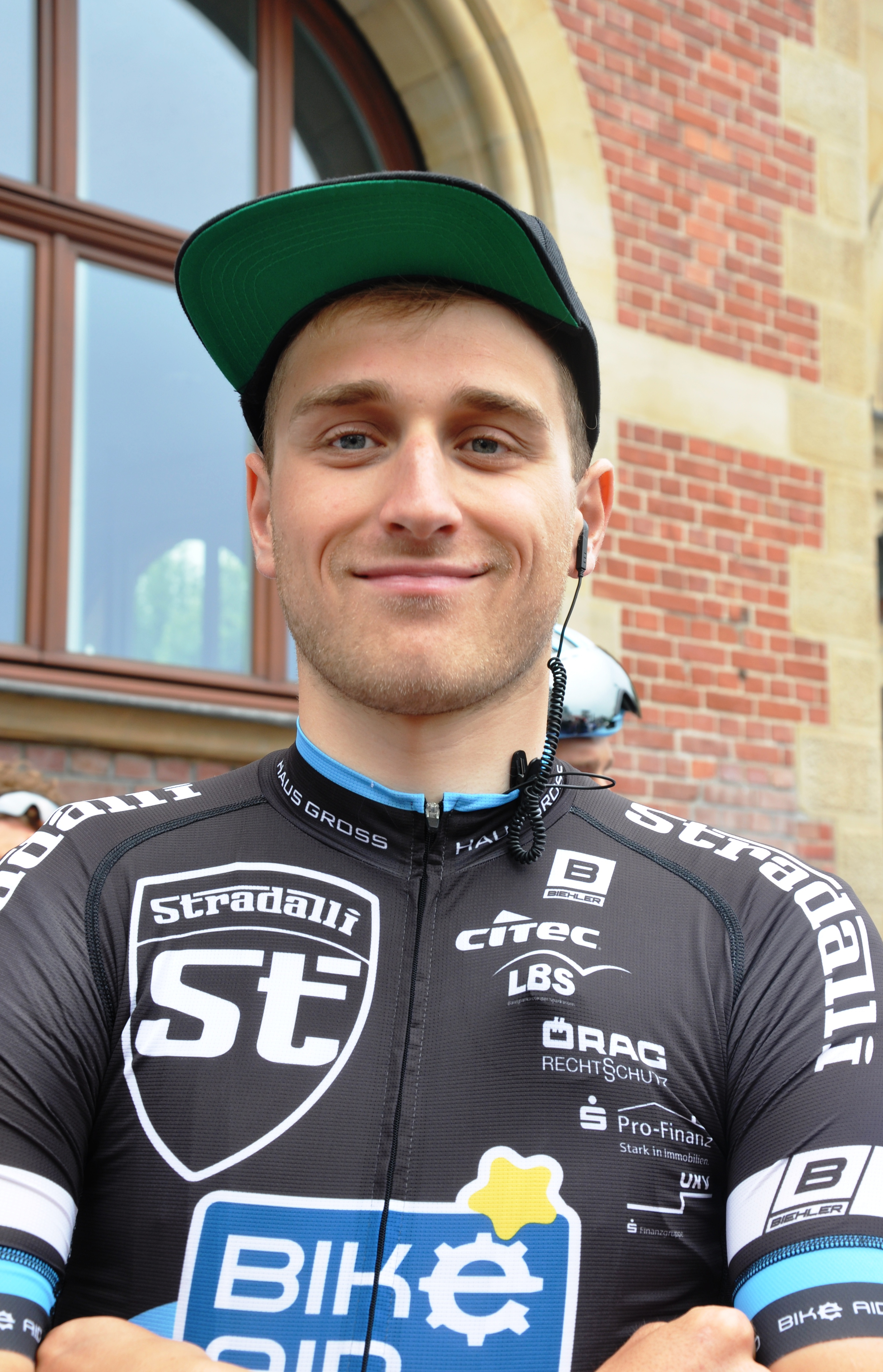

Personal information
- Born: 15 September 1991 (age 35)

Cycling career
- Sport: Cycling
- Role: Rider

Dominik Merseburg (born 15 September 1991) is a German professional racing cyclist. He rode in the men's team time trial at the 2016 UCI Road World Championships.
