= 2020 UCI Europe Tour =

Sixteenth season of the UCI Europe Tour

- Sixteenth edition of the UCI Europe Tour

Details
- Dates: 25 January – 14 October
- Location: Europe
- Races: 109

Champions
- Individual champion: Primož Roglič (SLO) (Team Jumbo–Visma)
- Teams' champion: Alpecin–Fenix (BEL)
- Nations' champion: Slovenia

The 2020 UCI Europe Tour was the sixteenth season of the UCI Europe Tour. The 2020 season began on 25 January 2020 with the GP Belek and ended on 14 October 2020 with the Scheldeprijs.

Throughout the season, points are awarded to the top finishers of stages within stage races and the final general classification standings of each of the stages races and one-day events. The quality and complexity of a race also determines how many points are awarded to the top finishers, the higher the UCI rating of a race, the more points are awarded.

The UCI ratings from highest to lowest are as follows:

- Multi-day events: 2.Pro, 2.1 and 2.2
- One-day events: 1.Pro, 1.1 and 1.2

== Events ==
=== January ===
| Date | Race name | Location | UCI Rating | Winner | Team | Ref. |
|---|---|---|---|---|---|---|
| 25 January | GP Belek | Turkey | 1.2 | Emre Yavuz (TUR) | Salcano–Sakarya BB Team | |
| 30 January | Trofeo Felanitx, Ses Salines, Campos, Porreres | Spain | 1.1 | Matteo Moschetti (ITA) | Trek–Segafredo | |
| 31 January | Trofeo Serra de Tramuntana | Spain | 1.1 | Emanuel Buchmann (GER) | Bora–Hansgrohe | |

=== February ===
| Date | Race name | Location | UCI Rating | Winner | Team | Ref. |
|---|---|---|---|---|---|---|
| 1 February | Trofeo Pollença-Andratx | Spain | 1.1 | Marc Soler (ESP) | Movistar Team | |
| 2 February | Trofeo Playa de Palma-Palma | Spain | 1.1 | Matteo Moschetti (ITA) | Trek–Segafredo | |
| 2 February | Grand Prix La Marseillaise | France | 1.1 | Benoît Cosnefroy (FRA) | AG2R La Mondiale | |
| 5–9 February | Étoile de Bessèges | France | 2.1 | Benoît Cosnefroy (FRA) | AG2R La Mondiale | |
| 5–9 February | Volta a la Comunitat Valenciana | Spain | 2.Pro | Tadej Pogačar (SLO) | UAE Team Emirates | |
| 9 February | GP Manavgat | Turkey | 1.2 | Branislau Samoilau (BLR) | Minsk Cycling Club | |
| 13 February | Grand Prix Alanya | Turkey | 1.2 | Paweł Bernas (POL) | Mazowsze Serce Polski | |
| 13–16 February | Tour de la Provence | France | 2.Pro | Nairo Quintana (COL) | Arkéa–Samsic | |
| 14 February | Grand Prix Gazipaşa | Turkey | 1.2 | Mamyr Stash (RUS) | Russia (national team) | |
| 14–15 February | Vuelta a Murcia | Spain | 2.1 | Xandro Meurisse (BEL) | Circus–Wanty Gobert | |
| 16 February | GP Antalya | Turkey | 1.2 | Maxim Piskunov (RUS) | Marathon–Tula | |
| 16 February | Clásica de Almería | Spain | 1.Pro | Pascal Ackermann (GER) | Bora–Hansgrohe | |
| 16 February | Trofeo Laigueglia | Italy | 1.Pro | Giulio Ciccone (ITA) | Italy (national team) | |
| 19–23 February | Volta ao Algarve | Portugal | 2.Pro | Remco Evenepoel (BEL) | Deceuninck–Quick-Step | |
| 19–23 February | Vuelta a Andalucía | Spain | 2.Pro | Jakob Fuglsang (DEN) | Astana | |
| 20–23 February | Tour of Antalya | Turkey | 2.1 | Max Stedman (GBR) | Canyon dhb p/b Soreen | |
| 21–23 February | Tour du Haut Var | France | 2.1 | Nairo Quintana (COL) | Arkéa–Samsic | |
| 29 February | Ster van Zwolle | Netherlands | 1.2 | David Dekker (NED) | SEG Racing Academy | |
| 29 February | Faun-Ardèche Classic | France | 1.Pro | Rémi Cavagna (FRA) | Deceuninck–Quick-Step | |
| 29 February | Grand Prix Velo Alanya | Turkey | 1.2 | Daniil Pronskiy (KAZ) | Vino–Astana Motors | |

=== March ===
| Date | Race name | Location | UCI Rating | Winner | Team | Ref. |
|---|---|---|---|---|---|---|
| 1 March | Royal Bernard Drôme Classic | France | 1.Pro | Simon Clarke (AUS) | EF Pro Cycling | |
| 1 March | Kuurne–Bruxelles–Kuurne | Belgium | 1.Pro | Kasper Asgreen (DEN) | Deceuninck–Quick-Step | |
| 1 March | Grand Prix Manavgat–Side | Turkey | 1.2 | Alan Banaszek (POL) | Mazowsze Serce Polski | |
| 1 March | International Rhodes Grand Prix | Greece | 1.2 | Erlend Blikra (NOR) | Uno-X Norwegian Development Team | |
| 3 March | Le Samyn | Belgium | 1.1 | Hugo Hofstetter (FRA) | Israel Start-Up Nation | |
| 4 March | Trofej Umag | Croatia | 1.2 | Olav Kooij (NED) | Jumbo–Visma Development Team | |
| 6–8 March | International Tour of Rhodes | Greece | 2.2 | Søren Wærenskjold (NOR) | Joker Fuel of Norway | |
| 8 March | Dorpenomloop Rucphen | Netherlands | 1.2 | David Dekker (NED) | SEG Racing Academy | |
| 8 March | Grand Prix de la Ville de Lillers | France | 1.2 | Florian Vachon (FRA) | Arkéa–Samsic | |
| 8 March | Grote Prijs Jean-Pierre Monseré | Belgium | 1.1 | Fabio Jakobsen (NED) | Deceuninck–Quick-Step | |
| 8 March | Trofej Poreč | Croatia | 1.2 | Olav Kooij (NED) | Jumbo–Visma Development Team | |

=== April–June ===
No race were held due to the COVID-19 pandemic.

=== July ===
| Date | Race name | Location | UCI Rating | Winner | Team | Ref. |
|---|---|---|---|---|---|---|
| 15–18 July | Dookoła Mazowsza | Poland | 2.2 | Michael Kukrle (CZE) | Elkov–Kasper | |
| 19 July | Puchar MON | Poland | 1.2 | Felix Groß (GER) | Germany (national team) | |
| 23–26 July | Sibiu Cycling Tour | Romania | 2.1 | Gregor Mühlberger (AUT) | Bora–Hansgrohe | |
| 25–26 July | In the footsteps of the Romans | Bulgaria | 2.2 | Norbert Banaszek (POL) | Mazowsze Serce Polski | |
| 26 July | GP Kranj | Slovenia | 1.2 | Olav Kooij (NED) | Jumbo–Visma Development Team | |
| 28–31 July | Tour of Bulgaria | Bulgaria | 2.2 | Patryk Stosz (POL) | Voster ATS Team | |
| 28 July–1 August | Vuelta a Burgos | Spain | 2.Pro | Remco Evenepoel (BEL) | Deceuninck–Quick-Step | |

=== August ===
| Date | Race name | Location | UCI Rating | Winner | Team | Ref. |
|---|---|---|---|---|---|---|
| 1–4 August | Route d'Occitanie | France | 2.1 | Egan Bernal (COL) | Team Ineos | |
| 2 August | Circuito de Getxo | Spain | 1.1 | Damiano Caruso (ITA) | Bahrain–McLaren | |
| 3 August | Gran Trittico Lombardo | Italy | 1.Pro | Gorka Izagirre (ESP) | Astana | |
| 5 August | Milano–Torino | Italy | 1.Pro | Arnaud Démare (FRA) | Groupama–FDJ | |
| 5–8 August | Tour of Szeklerland | Romania | 2.2 | Jakub Kaczmarek (POL) | Mazowsze Serce Polski | |
| 5–8 August | Tour de Savoie Mont-Blanc | France | 2.2 | Pierre Rolland (FRA) | B&B Hotels–Vital Concept | |
| 6 August | Mont Ventoux Dénivelé Challenge | France | 1.1 | Aleksandr Vlasov (RUS) | Astana | |
| 6–9 August | Czech Cycling Tour | Czech Republic | 2.1 | Damien Howson (AUS) | Mitchelton–Scott | |
| 7–9 August | Tour de l'Ain | France | 2.1 | Primož Roglič (SLO) | Team Jumbo–Visma | |
| 12 August | Gran Piemonte | Italy | 1.Pro | George Bennett (NZL) | Team Jumbo–Visma | |
| 12–16 August | Tour Bitwa Warszawska 1920 | Poland | 2.2 | Oscar Riesebeek (NED) | Alpecin–Fenix | |
| 13–15 August | Baltic Chain Tour | Estonia | 2.2 | Gert Jõeäär (EST) | Estonia (national team) | |
| 15 August | Dwars door het Hageland | Belgium | 1.Pro | Jonas Rickaert (BEL) | Alpecin–Fenix | |
| 16–19 August | Tour de Wallonie | Belgium | 2.Pro | Arnaud Démare (FRA) | Groupama–FDJ | |
| 18 August | Giro dell'Emilia | Italy | 1.Pro | Aleksandr Vlasov (RUS) | Astana | |
| 18–21 August | Tour du Limousin | France | 2.1 | Luca Wackermann (ITA) | Vini Zabù–KTM | |
| 27–30 August | Tour du Poitou-Charentes | France | 2.1 | Arnaud Démare (FRA) | Groupama–FDJ | |
| 29 August | Druivenkoers Overijse | Belgium | 1.1 | Florian Sénéchal (FRA) | Deceuninck–Quick-Step | |
| 29 August | Trofeo Matteotti | Italy | 1.1 | Valerio Conti (ITA) | UAE Team Emirates | |
| 29 August–2 September | Tour de Hongrie | Hungary | 2.1 | Attila Valter (HUN) | CCC Team | |
| 29 August–5 September | Giro Ciclistico d'Italia | Italy | 2.2U | Tom Pidcock (GBR) | Trinity Racing | |
| 30 August | Brussels Cycling Classic | Belgium | 1.Pro | Tim Merlier (BEL) | Alpecin–Fenix | |
| 30 August | Memorial Marco Pantani | Italy | 1.1 | Fabio Felline (ITA) | Astana | |
| 31 August | Carpathian Couriers Race | Poland | 1.2U | Jordan Habets (NED) | Wielerploeg Groot Amsterdam | |

=== September ===
| Date | Race name | Location(s) | UCI Rating | Winner | Team | Ref. |
|---|---|---|---|---|---|---|
| 1–3 September | Tour de Serbie | Serbia | 2.2 | Martin Haring (SVK) | Dukla Banská Bystrica | |
| 1–4 September | Settimana Internazionale di Coppi e Bartali | Italy | 2.1 | Jhonatan Narváez (ECU) | Ineos Grenadiers | |
| 3 September | Grand Prix Develi | Turkey | 1.2 | Anatolii Budiak (UKR) | Ukraine (national team) | |
| 3–6 September | Bałtyk–Karkonosze Tour | Poland | 2.2 | Stanisław Aniołkowski (POL) | CCC Development Team | |
| 4 September | Hafjell GP | Norway | 1.2 | Andreas Leknessund (NOR) | Uno-X Pro Cycling Team | |
| 4 September | Grand Prix Cappadocia | Turkey | 1.2 | Mykhaylo Kononenko (UKR) | Ukraine (national team) | |
| 4–7 September | Belgrade–Banja Luka | Serbia; Bosnia and Herzegovina | 2.1 | Jakub Kaczmarek (POL) | Mazowsze Serce Polski | |
| 5 September | Lillehammer GP | Norway | 1.2 | Andreas Leknessund (NOR) | Uno-X Pro Cycling Team | |
| 5 September | Grand Prix Mount Erciyes | Turkey | 1.2 | Ivan Smirnov (RUS) | Russia (national team) | |
| 6 September | Grand Prix World's Best High Altitude | Turkey | 1.2 | Anatolii Budiak (UKR) | Ukraine (national team) | |
| 6 September | Gylne Gutuer | Norway | 1.2 | Trond Trondsen (NOR) | Team Coop | |
| 6 September | Tour du Doubs | France | 1.1 | Loïc Vliegen (BEL) | Circus–Wanty Gobert | |
| 8–13 September | Tour of Romania | Romania | 2.2 | Eduard-Michael Grosu (ROU) | Romania (national team) | |
| 9–12 September | Course de Solidarność et des Champions Olympiques | Poland | 2.2 | Stanisław Aniołkowski (POL) | CCC Development Team | |
| 12–13 September | Orlen Nations Grand Prix | Poland | 2.Ncup | Olav Kooij (NED) | Netherlands (national team) | |
| 13 September | Antwerp Port Epic | Belgium | 1.1 | Gianni Vermeersch (BEL) | Alpecin–Fenix | |
| 14 September | Grand Prix Velo Erciyes | Turkey | 1.2 | Vitaliy Buts (UKR) | Ukraine (national team) | |
| 15 September | Grand Prix Central Anatolia | Turkey | 1.2 | Mykhaylo Kononenko (UKR) | Ukraine (national team) | |
| 15–19 September | Tour de Luxembourg | Luxembourg | 2.Pro | Diego Ulissi (ITA) | UAE Team Emirates | |
| 16 September | Giro di Toscana | Italy | 1.1 | Fernando Gaviria (COL) | UAE Team Emirates | |
| 16–19 September | Okolo Slovenska | Slovakia | 2.1 | Jannik Steimle (GER) | Deceuninck–Quick-Step | |
| 17 September | Coppa Sabatini | Italy | 1.Pro | Dion Smith (NZL) | Mitchelton–Scott | |
| 17–20 September | Ronde de l'Isard | France | 2.2U | Xandres Vervloesem (BEL) | Lotto–Soudal U23 | |
| 17–20 September | Tour of Małopolska | Poland | 2.2 | Vojtěch Řepa (CZE) | Topforex–Lapierre | |
| 19 September | Giro dell'Appennino | Italy | 1.1 | Ethan Hayter (GBR) | Ineos Grenadiers | |
| 19–20 September | Troféu Joaquim Agostinho | Portugal | 2.2 | Frederico Figueiredo (POR) | Atum General / Tavira / Maria Nova Hotel | |
| 20 September | Gooikse Pijl | Belgium | 1.1 | Danny van Poppel (NED) | Circus–Wanty Gobert | |
| 20 September | Grand Prix d'Isbergues | France | 1.1 | Nacer Bouhanni (FRA) | Arkéa–Samsic | |
| 20 September | Trofeo Città di San Vendemiano | Italy | 1.2U | Antonio Tiberi (ITA) | Team Colpack–Ballan | |
| 22 September | Paris–Camembert | France | 1.1 | Dorian Godon (FRA) | AG2R La Mondiale | |
| 26–27 September | Tour of Mevlana | Turkey | 2.2 | Artur Ershov (RUS) | Gazprom–RusVelo | |
| 27 September | Paris–Chauny | France | 1.1 | Nacer Bouhanni (FRA) | Arkéa–Samsic | |
| 27 September–5 October | Volta a Portugal | Portugal | 2.1 | Amaro Antunes (POR) | W52 / FC Porto | |

=== October ===
| Date | Race name | Location | UCI Rating | Winner | Team | Ref. |
|---|---|---|---|---|---|---|
| 4 October | Piccolo Giro di Lombardia | Italy | 1.2U | Harry Sweeny (AUS) | Lotto–Soudal U23 | |
| 7 October | Brabantse Pijl | Belgium | 1.Pro | Julian Alaphilippe (FRA) | Deceuninck–Quick-Step | |
| 8–11 October | Giro della Regione Friuli Venezia Giulia | Italy | 2.2 | Andreas Leknessund (NOR) | Uno-X Pro Cycling Team | |
| 10 October | Visegrad 4 Bicycle Race - GP Slovakia | Slovakia | 1.2 | Stanisław Aniołkowski (POL) | CCC Development Team | |
| 11 October | Paris–Tours | France | 1.Pro | Casper Pedersen (DEN) | Team Sunweb | |
| 11 October | Paris–Tours Espoirs | France | 1.2U | Rune Herregodts (BEL) | Home Solution–Soenens | |
| 12 October | Prueba Villafranca de Ordizia | Spain | 1.1 | Simon Carr (GBR) | Nippo–Delko–One Provence | |
| 14 October | Scheldeprijs | Belgium | 1.Pro | Caleb Ewan (AUS) | Lotto–Soudal | |
