= Johnatan Cañaveral =

Colombian cyclist

Personal information
- Full name: Johnatan Cañaveral Vargas
- Born: 2 November 1996 (age 29) Pereira, Colombia

Cycling career
- Sport: Cycling
- Discipline: Road
- Role: Rider
- Rider type: Climber

Amateur teams
- 2016: Telco'm–Ginex
- 2017: GSport–Valencia Sports–Wolfbike

Professional teams
- 2018–2019: Coldeportes Bicicletas Strongman
- 2020: Giotti Victoria
- 2021–2022: Bardiani–CSF–Faizanè

Johnatan Cañaveral Vargas (born 2 November 1996) is a Colombian cyclist, who most recently rode for UCI ProTeam Bardiani–CSF–Faizanè.

== Major results ==
2017
3rd Road race, National Under-23 Road Championships
2018
2nd Gran Premio Comite Olímpico Nacional
4th Overall Vuelta a Costa Rica

1st Young rider classification
1st Stage 8

4th Overall Circuit des Ardennes

1st Young rider classification

10th GP Adria Mobil
10th Giro del Belvedere
2019
1st Stage 2 Vuelta a Boyacá
7th Overall Vuelta Ciclista Comunidad de Madrid
2020
8th Overall Turul Romaniei
