= Piotr Pękala =

Polish cyclist (born 1998)

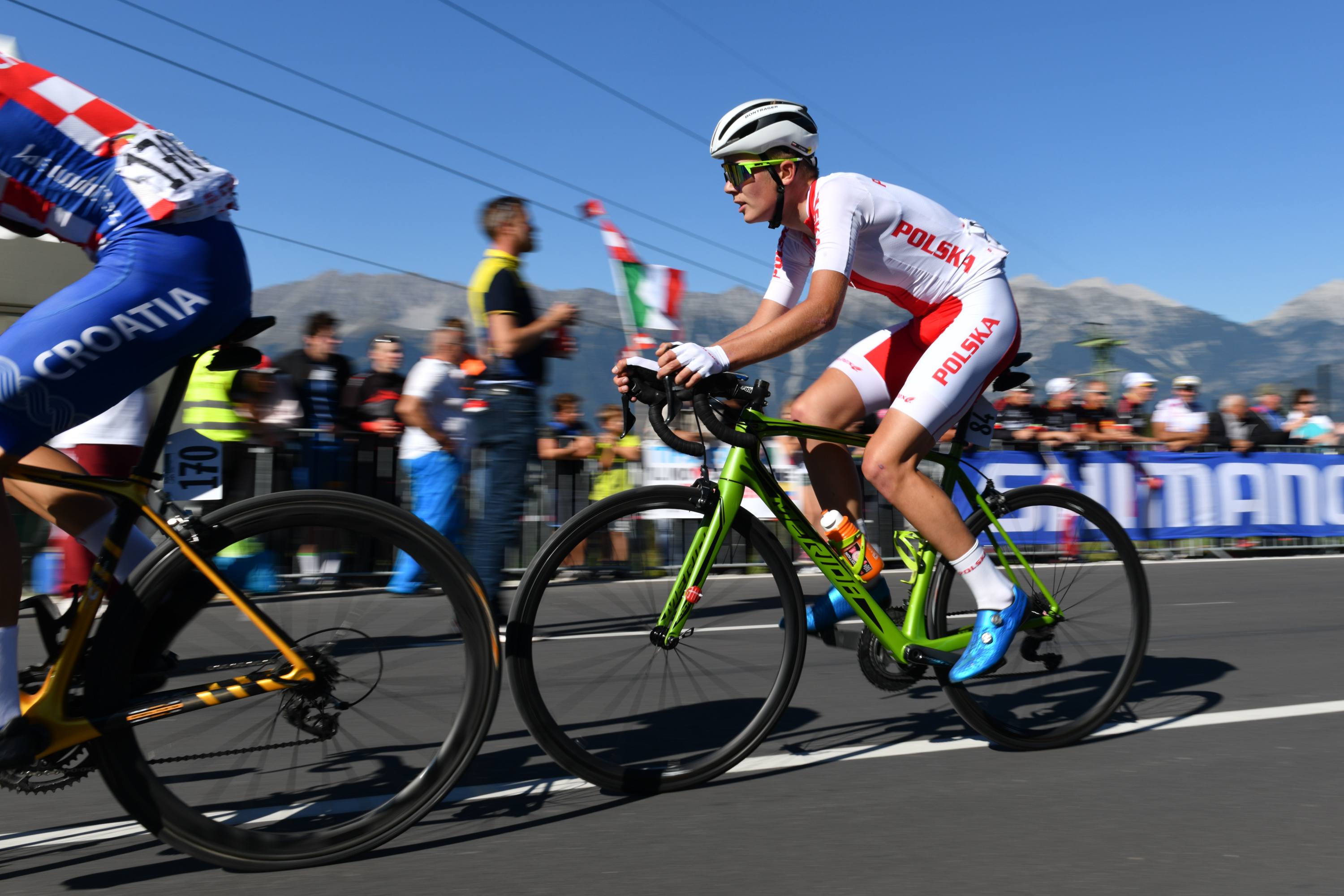
- Pękala in 2018.

Personal information
- Born: 4 August 1998 (age 28) Kurów, Poland
- Height: 1.81 m (5 ft 11 in)
- Weight: 65 kg (143 lb)

Cycling career
- Sport: Cycling
- Current team: ATT Investments
- Discipline: Road
- Role: Rider
- Rider type: Climber

Amateur teams
- 2016–2018: KS Pogoń Mostostal Puławy
- 2021: KS Pogoń Mostostal Puławy

Professional teams
- 2019–2020: CCC Development Team
- 2022–2024: Santic–Wibatech
- 2025–: ATT Investments

Piotr Pękala (born 4 August 1998) is a Polish professional racing cyclist, who currently rides for UCI Continental team ATT Investments.

== Major results ==
2018
9th Puchar Uzdrowisk Karpackich
2019
10th Puchar Uzdrowisk Karpackich
2020
8th Overall Bałtyk–Karkonosze Tour
9th Overall Giro della Regione Friuli Venezia Giulia
2021
5th Memorial Henryka Łasaka
2022
Visegrad 4 Bicycle Race

6th GP Slovakia
8th Kerekparverseny

6th Memoriał Jana Magiery
2023
2nd Memoriał Jana Magiery
3rd National Hill Climb Championships
5th Memorial Henryka Łasaka
10th GP Slovakia, Visegrad 4 Bicycle Race
2024
1st Overall Belgrade Banjaluka

1st Mountains classification
1st Stage 3

1st Stage 4 Tour Battle of Warsaw
3rd Overall Okolo Jižních Čech
4th Overall Tour of Malopolska
10th Overall Tour of Szeklerland
2025
3rd Time trial, National Championships
8th Overall CRO Race
10th Overall Okolo Slovenska
2026
1st GP Czech Republic
National Championships

2nd Road race
3rd Time trial

7th Overall Tour of Malopolska
9th Overall Tour of Hellas
