= Adne van Engelen =

Dutch cyclist (born 1993)

Personal information
- Full name: Adne van Engelen
- Born: 16 March 1993 (age 33) 't Zand, Netherlands
- Height: 1.65 m (5 ft 5 in)
- Weight: 53 kg (117 lb)

Cycling career
- Sport: Cycling
- Current team: Roojai Insurance Winspace
- Discipline: Road
- Role: Rider

Amateur team
- 2014–2016: WV West–Frisia

Professional teams
- 2016: Parkhotel Valkenburg Continental Team
- 2017–2022: Bike Aid
- 2023–2024: Roojai Online Insurance
- 2025–: Terengganu Cycling Team

Adne van Engelen (born 16 March 1993) is a Dutch cyclist, who currently rides for UCI Continental team Terengganu Cycling Team.

== Major results ==
2015
2nd Overall Tour of Egypt
2016
6th Overall Tour de Hongrie
7th Overall Tour of Thailand
2017
3rd Overall Tour du Cameroun
2018
1st Road race, World University Cycling Championships
1st Stage 10 Tour of Poyang Lake
2019
3rd Overall Tour of Mesopotamia
2020
4th Overall Tour of Thailand
7th Overall Sibiu Cycling Tour
9th Overall Turul Romaniei
2021
2nd Overall Tour of Thailand

1st Mountains classification
1st Stage 6

6th Overall Tour of Kosovo
2022
2nd Overall Tour de Serbie
8th Overall Tour of Azerbaijan
9th Overall Tour of Thailand
2023
1st Overall Tour of Sharjah

1st Stage 4

3rd Overall New Zealand Cycle Classic
7th Overall Tour de Langkawi
2024
1st Overall Tour of Thailand
5th Overall Tour of Japan
10th Overall Tour de Taiwan
2025
7th Overall Tour of Sharjah
8th Overall Tour of Japan
2026
1st Grand Prix Pedalia
2nd Overall Tour of Bostonliq
3rd Overall Tour of Sharjah
5th Overall Tour of Thailand
7th Overall Tour of Japan
