= Bike Aid =

German cycling team

Team information
- UCI code: BAI
- Registered: Germany
- Founded: 2012
- Discipline: Road
- Status: National (2012–2013); UCI Continental (2014–)

Key personnel
- General manager: Timo Schäfer
- Team managers: Jacob Buijk; Yves Beau; Xavier Depecker; Lutz Drehkopf; Lex Nederlof; Tino Thömel

Team name history
- 2012 2013 2014 2015 2016 2017–: Bike Aid; Bike Aid–Schwalbe Trier; Bike Aid–Ride for Help; Bike Aid; Stradalli–Bike Aid; Bike Aid

Bike Aid is a German UCI Continental team founded in 2012, that participates in UCI Continental Circuits races.

== Team roster ==
As of 10 February 2022.

Rider	Date of birth
Léo Bouvier (FRA)	14 February 1998 (age 28)
Lucas Carstensen (GER)	16 June 1994 (age 32)
Jesse de Rooij (NED)	5 January 1999 (age 27)
Enzo Decker (GER)	28 July 2003 (age 23)
Halil İbrahim Doğan (TUR)	6 October 2000 (age 25)
Jesse Ewart (IRL)	31 July 1994 (age 32)
Nikodemus Holler (GER)	4 May 1991 (age 35)
Salim Kipkemboi (KEN)	30 November 1998 (age 27)

Rider	Date of birth
Julian Lino (FRA)	4 October 1995 (age 30)
Wesley Mol (GER)	25 February 1999 (age 27)
Sebastian Niehues (GER)	27 July 1999 (age 27)
Jasper Pahlke (GER)	14 July 2002 (age 24)
Matthias Schnapka (GER)	27 July 1980 (age 46)
Adne van Engelen (NED)	16 March 1993 (age 33)
Dawit Yemane (ERI)	1 January 1998 (age 28)

== Major wins ==
2014
Overall Tour du Cameroun, Dan Craven

Stage 5, Daniel Bichlmann

Overall Grand Prix Chantal Biya, Mekseb Debesay

Stage 4, Mekseb Debesay

Stages 1 & 6 Tour du Rwanda, Mekseb Debesay
2015
Stage 4 Vuelta a la Independencia Nacional, Yannick Mayer
Overall, Tour de Blida, Mekseb Debesay

Stage 1, Mekseb Debesay

Critérium International de Sétif, Mekseb Debesay
Stage 3 Tour International de Sétif, Mekseb Debesay
Stage 8 Tour du Faso, Mekseb Debesay
Stages 1 & 4 Tour du Rwanda, Mekseb Debesay
2016
Stage 5 Tour du Cameroun, Jean Bosco Nsengimana
Stage 2 Tour of Eritrea, Meron Teshome
Stage 4 Grand Prix Chantal Biya, Jean Bosco Nsengimana
2017
Time trial, African Road Championships, Meron Teshome
Overall Tour du Cameroun, Nikodemus Holler

Stage 2, Nikodemus Holler
Stages 3 & 5, Meron Teshome

Stages 1 & 3 Tour of Eritrea, Meron Teshome
Stage 3 Tour of Ukraine, Tino Thömel
2018
Stage 1 La Tropicale Amissa Bongo, Lucas Carstensen
Stage 3 Sharjah International Cycling Tour, Salim Kipkemboi
Stage 5 Rás Tailteann, Lucas Carstensen
Stages 4 & 5 Tour de Hongrie, Nikodemus Holler
Stage 2 Tour of Hainan, Lucas Carstensen
Stage 6 Tour de Singkarak, Clint Hendricks
Stage 8 Tour de Singkarak, Nikodemus Holler
2019
Grand Prix Alanya, Lucas Carstensen
Overall Tour of Mersin, Peter Koning

Stage 2, Aaron Grosser
Stage 3, Peter Koning

2020
Prologue Sibiu Cycling Tour, Nikodemus Holler
Prologue Tour of Romania, Justin Wolf
Stage 2 Tour of Romania, Lucas Carstensen
Overall Tour of Thailand, Nikodemus Holler

Stages 2 & 5, Lucas Carstensen

2021
Stage 1 Tour of Mevlana, Justin Wolf
Stage 1 Belgrade Banjaluka, Justin Wolf
Stage 6 Tour de Bretagne, Justin Wolf
Stages 1, 2, 4 & 5 Tour of Thailand, Lucas Carstensen
Stage 6 Tour of Thailand, Adne van Engelen
2022
Road race, African Road Championships, Henok Mulubrhan
Stage 1 Tour of Romania, Lucas Carstensen
Overall Tour de Serbie, Dawit Yemane

Stage 3, Dawit Yemane

Stage 2 Tour of Azerbaijan (Iran), Lucas Carstensen
