= 2022 Tour of Romania =

2022 UCI Europe Tour

Race details
- Dates: 6–11 September
- Stages: 5 + Prologue
- Distance: 787.7 km (489.5 mi)
- Winning time: 16h 56' 20"

Results
Jersey awarded to the overall winner	Winner	Mark Stewart (GBR)	(Bolton Equities Black Spoke Pro Cycling)
	Second	Cristian Raileanu (ROU)	(Romania)
	Third	Jakub Otruba (CZE)	(Elkov–Kasper)
Jersey awarded to the points classification winner	Points	Eduard-Michael Grosu (ROU)	(Drone Hopper–Androni Giocattoli)
Jersey awarded to the mountains classification winner	Mountains	Cormac McGeough (IRL)	(Wildlife Generation Pro Cycling)
	Team	Bolton Equities Black Spoke Pro Cycling	

The 2022 Tour of Romania was a six-day cycling stage race that took place in Romania in September 2022. The race was the 55th edition of the Tour of Romania. The tour was rated as a 2.1 event, as part of the 2022 UCI Europe Tour.

Mark Stewart became the first British rider to win the Tour of Romania.

== Route ==
Stages of the 2022 Tour of Romania
Stage	Date	Route	Distance	Type	Winner
Prologue	6 September	Satu Mare (ITT)	2.1 km (1.3 mi)	Individual time trial	Tom Sexton (NZL)
1	7 September	Satu Mare to Bistrița	205.2 km (127.5 mi)	Plain stage	Lucas Carstensen (GER)
2	8 September	Bistrița to Târgu Mureș	166.4 km (103.4 mi)	Plain stage	Daniel Babor (CZE)
3	9 September	Târgu Mureș to Făgăraș	154 km (96 mi)	Intermediate stage	Eduard-Michael Grosu (ROU)
4	10 September	Cristian to Curtea de Argeș	208 km (129 mi)	Mountain stage	Jakub Otruba (CZE)
5	11 September	Bucharest (circuit)	52 km (32 mi)	Plain stage	Daniel Babor (CZE)
Total			787.7 km (489.5 mi)		

== Teams ==
25 teams were at the start of the race. These included two UCI Pro teams, 21 Continental teams and two national teams.

UCI Pro teams

- Caja Rural–Seguros RGA
- Drone Hopper–Androni Giocattoli

UCI Continental teams

- Bolton Equities Black Spoke Pro Cycling
- EvoPro Racing
- Voster ATS Team
- Mentorise Elite Team CFX
- Giotti Victoria–Savini Due
- Team Novak
- Team Medellín–EPM
- ATT Investments
- Work Service–Vitalcare–Vega
- MG.K Vis Colors for Peace VPM
- WSA KTM Graz p/b Leomo
- Bike Aid
- Abloc CT
- Elkov–Kasper
- Electro Hiper Europa–Caldas
- Wildlife Generation Pro Cycling
- Premier Tech U-23 Cycling Project
- China Glory Continental Cycling Team
- HRE Mazowsze Serce Polski
- Meiyo CCN Pro Cycling
- Beltrami TSA–Tre Colli

National teams

- Romania
- Bulgaria

== Stages ==
=== Prologue ===
6 September 2022 — Satu Mare, 2.1 km (1.3 mi) (ITT)

Prologue Result
Rank	Rider	Team	Time
1	Tom Sexton (NZL)	Bolton Equities Black Spoke Pro Cycling	2' 30"
2	Nicolas Dalla Valle (ITA)	Giotti Victoria–Savini Due	+ 1"
3	Eduard-Michael Grosu (ROU)	Drone Hopper–Androni Giocattoli	+ 1"
4	Aaron Gate (NZL)	Bolton Equities Black Spoke Pro Cycling	+ 2"
5	Daniel Crista (ROU)	Romania	+ 2"
6	Brendan Rhim (USA)	Wildlife Generation Pro Cycling	+ 3"
7	Davide Plebani (ITA)	Work Service–Vitalcare–Vega	+ 4"
8	Tobiasz Pawlak (POL)	HRE Mazowsze Serce Polski	+ 4"
9	Filippo Tagliani (POL)	Drone Hopper–Androni Giocattoli	+ 4"
10	Miká Heming (GER)	ATT Investments	+ 4"

General classification after Prologue
Rank	Rider	Team	Time
1	Tom Sexton (NZL)	Bolton Equities Black Spoke Pro Cycling	2' 30"
2	Nicolas Dalla Valle (ITA)	Giotti Victoria–Savini Due	+ 1"
3	Eduard-Michael Grosu (ROU)	Drone Hopper–Androni Giocattoli	+ 1"
4	Aaron Gate (NZL)	Bolton Equities Black Spoke Pro Cycling	+ 2"
5	Daniel Crista (ROU)	Romania	+ 2"
6	Brendan Rhim (USA)	Wildlife Generation Pro Cycling	+ 3"
7	Davide Plebani (ITA)	Work Service–Vitalcare–Vega	+ 4"
8	Tobiasz Pawlak (POL)	HRE Mazowsze Serce Polski	+ 4"
9	Filippo Tagliani (POL)	Drone Hopper–Androni Giocattoli	+ 4"
10	Miká Heming (GER)	ATT Investments	+ 4"

=== Stage 1 ===
7 September 2022 — Satu Mare to Bistrița, 205.2 km (127.5 mi)

Stage 1 Result
Rank	Rider	Team	Time
1	Lucas Carstensen (GER)	Bike Aid	4h 58' 25"
2	Daniel Babor (CZE)	Elkov–Kasper	+ 0"
3	Eduard-Michael Grosu (ROU)	Drone Hopper–Androni Giocattoli	+ 0"
4	Alan Banaszek (POL)	HRE Mazowsze Serce Polski	+ 0"
5	Nicolas Dalla Valle (ITA)	Giotti Victoria–Savini Due	+ 0"
6	Cristian Raileanu (ROU)	Romania	+ 0"
7	Matúš Štoček (SVK)	ATT Investments	+ 0"
8	Léo Bouvier (FRA)	Bike Aid	+ 0"
9	Andrea Biancalani (ITA)	Beltrami TSA–Tre Colli	+ 0"
10	Jesper Rasch (FRA)	Abloc CT	+ 0"

General classification after Stage 1
Rank	Rider	Team	Time
1	Eduard-Michael Grosu (ROU)	Drone Hopper–Androni Giocattoli	5h 00' 50"
2	Cormac McGeough (IRL)	Wildlife Generation Pro Cycling	+ 3"
3	Tom Sexton (NZL)	Bolton Equities Black Spoke Pro Cycling	+ 4"
4	Nicolas Dalla Valle (ITA)	Giotti Victoria–Savini Due	+ 5"
5	Daniel Babor (CZE)	Elkov–Kasper	+ 5"
6	Aaron Gate (NZL)	Bolton Equities Black Spoke Pro Cycling	+ 5"
7	Lucas Carstensen (GER)	Bike Aid	+ 5"
8	Daniel Crista (ROU)	Romania	+ 6"
9	Brendan Rhim (USA)	Wildlife Generation Pro Cycling	+ 7"
10	Davide Plebani (ITA)	Work Service–Vitalcare–Vega	+ 8"

=== Stage 2 ===
8 September 2022 — Bistrița to Târgu Mureș, 181 km (112 mi)

Stage 2 Result
Rank	Rider	Team	Time
1	Daniel Babor (CZE)	Elkov–Kasper	3h 49' 50"
2	Joren Bloem (NED)	Abloc CT	+ 0"
3	Nicolas Dalla Valle (ITA)	Giotti Victoria–Savini Due	+ 0"
4	Matteo Malucelli (ITA)	Roland Cogeas Edelweiss Squad	+ 0"
5	Alan Banaszek (POL)	HRE Mazowsze Serce Polski	+ 0"
6	Luke Mudgway (NZL)	Bolton Equities Black Spoke Pro Cycling	+ 0"
7	Eduard-Michael Grosu (ROU)	Drone Hopper–Androni Giocattoli	+ 0"
8	Samuele Zambelli (ITA)	Work Service–Vitalcare–Vega	+ 0"
9	Jakub Murias (POL)	Voster ATS Team	+ 0"
10	Miká Heming (GER)	ATT Investments	+ 0"

General classification after Stage 2
Rank	Rider	Team	Time
1	Daniel Babor (CZE)	Elkov–Kasper	8h 50' 35"
2	Eduard-Michael Grosu (ROU)	Drone Hopper–Androni Giocattoli	+ 2"
3	Nicolas Dalla Valle (ITA)	Giotti Victoria–Savini Due	+ 6"
4	Joren Bloem (NED)	Abloc CT	+ 8"
5	Aaron Gate (NZL)	Bolton Equities Black Spoke Pro Cycling	+ 8"
6	Cormac McGeough (IRL)	Wildlife Generation Pro Cycling	+ 8"
7	Tom Sexton (NZL)	Bolton Equities Black Spoke Pro Cycling	+ 8"
8	Lucas Carstensen (GER)	Bike Aid	+ 10"
9	Daniel Crista (ROU)	Romania	+ 11"
10	Miká Heming (GER)	ATT Investments	+ 12"

=== Stage 3 ===
9 September 2022 — Târgu Mureș to Făgăraș, 154 km (96 mi)

Stage 3 Result
Rank	Rider	Team	Time
1	Eduard-Michael Grosu (ROU)	Drone Hopper–Androni Giocattoli	3h 30 15"
2	Brendan Rhim (USA)	Wildlife Generation Pro Cycling	+ 0"
3	Alan Banaszek (POL)	HRE Mazowsze Serce Polski	+ 0"
4	Joren Bloem (NED)	Abloc CT	+ 0"
5	Tomasz Budziński (POL)	HRE Mazowsze Serce Polski	+ 0"
6	Jakub Murias (POL)	Voster ATS Team	+ 0"
7	Antti-Jussi Juntunen (FIN)	Abloc CT	+ 0"
8	Nicolas Dalla Valle (ITA)	Giotti Victoria–Savini Due	+ 0"
9	Miká Heming (GER)	ATT Investments	+ 0"
10	Tom Sexton (NZL)	Bolton Equities Black Spoke Pro Cycling	+ 0"

General classification after Stage 3
Rank	Rider	Team	Time
1	Eduard-Michael Grosu (ROU)	Drone Hopper–Androni Giocattoli	12h 20' 34"
2	Nicolas Dalla Valle (ITA)	Giotti Victoria–Savini Due	+ 17"
3	Brendan Rhim (USA)	Wildlife Generation Pro Cycling	+ 21"
4	Tom Sexton (NZL)	Bolton Equities Black Spoke Pro Cycling	+ 22"
5	Joren Bloem (NED)	Abloc CT	+ 23"
6	Alan Banaszek (POL)	HRE Mazowsze Serce Polski	+ 25"
7	Miká Heming (GER)	ATT Investments	+ 27"
8	Matúš Štoček (SVK)	ATT Investments	+ 28"
9	David González (ESP)	Caja Rural–Seguros RGA	+ 29"
10	Emil Dima (ROU)	Giotti Victoria–Savini Due	+ 30"

=== Stage 4 ===
10 September 2022 — Cristian to Curtea de Argeș, 209 km (130 mi)

Stage 4 Result
Rank	Rider	Team	Time
1	Jakub Otruba (CZE)	Elkov–Kasper	5h 06 55"
2	Mark Stewart (GBR)	Bolton Equities Black Spoke Pro Cycling	+ 0"
3	Cristian Raileanu (ROU)	Romania	+ 0"
4	Natnael Tesfatsion (ERI)	Drone Hopper–Androni Giocattoli	+ 1' 02"
5	Alan Banaszek (POL)	HRE Mazowsze Serce Polski	+ 1' 02"
6	Lorenzo Ginestra (ITA)	Work Service–Vitalcare–Vega	+ 1' 02"
7	Miká Heming (GER)	ATT Investments	+ 1' 02"
8	Michal Schlegel (CZE)	Caja Rural–Seguros RGA	+ 1' 02"
9	Emil Dima (ROU)	Giotti Victoria–Savini Due	+ 1' 02"
10	Michael Kukrle (CZE)	Elkov–Kasper	+ 1' 02"

General classification after Stage 4
Rank	Rider	Team	Time
1	Mark Stewart (GBR)	Bolton Equities Black Spoke Pro Cycling	16h 56' 20"
2	Cristian Raileanu (ROU)	Romania	+ 13"
3	Jakub Otruba (CZE)	Elkov–Kasper	+ 14"
4	Alan Banaszek (POL)	HRE Mazowsze Serce Polski	+ 1' 04"
5	Miká Heming (GER)	ATT Investments	+ 1' 08"
6	Emil Dima (ROU)	Giotti Victoria–Savini Due	+ 1' 11"
7	Natnael Tesfatsion (ERI)	Drone Hopper–Androni Giocattoli	+ 1' 12"
8	Jefferson Alveiro Cepeda (ECU)	Caja Rural–Seguros RGA	+ 1' 13"
9	Nicolas Dalla Valle (ITA)	Giotti Victoria–Savini Due	+ 1' 15"
10	Tomasz Budziński (POL)	HRE Mazowsze Serce Polski	+ 1' 15"

=== Stage 5 ===
11 September 2022 — Bucharest, 96 km (60 mi)

Stage 5 Result
Rank	Rider	Team	Time
1	Daniel Babor (CZE)	Elkov–Kasper	1h 03' 07"
2	Alan Banaszek (POL)	HRE Mazowsze Serce Polski	+ 0"
3	Matteo Malucelli (ITA)	Roland Cogeas Edelweiss Squad	+ 0"
4	David González (ESP)	Caja Rural–Seguros RGA	+ 0"
5	Filippo Tagliani (ITA)	Drone Hopper–Androni Giocattoli	+ 0"
6	Nicolas Dalla Valle (ITA)	Giotti Victoria–Savini Due	+ 0"
7	Jakub Murias (POL)	Voster ATS Team	+ 0"
8	Eduard-Michael Grosu (ROU)	Drone Hopper–Androni Giocattoli	+ 0"
9	Jesper Rasch (NED)	Abloc CT	+ 0"
10	Andrea Biancalani (ITA)	Beltrami TSA–Tre Colli	+ 0"

General classification after Stage 5
Rank	Rider	Team	Time
1	Mark Stewart (GBR)	Bolton Equities Black Spoke Pro Cycling	16h 56' 20"
2	Cristian Raileanu (ROU)	Romania	+ 13"
3	Jakub Otruba (CZE)	Elkov–Kasper	+ 14"
4	Alan Banaszek (POL)	HRE Mazowsze Serce Polski	+ 1' 04"
5	Miká Heming (GER)	ATT Investments	+ 1' 08"
6	Emil Dima (ROU)	Giotti Victoria–Savini Due	+ 1' 11"
7	Natnael Tesfatsion (ERI)	Drone Hopper–Androni Giocattoli	+ 1' 12"
8	Jefferson Alveiro Cepeda (ECU)	Caja Rural–Seguros RGA	+ 1' 13"
9	Nicolas Dalla Valle (ITA)	Giotti Victoria–Savini Due	+ 1' 15"
10	Tomasz Budziński (POL)	HRE Mazowsze Serce Polski	+ 1' 15"

== Classification leadership table ==
Classification leadership by stage
Stage	Winner	General classification	Points classification	Mountains classification	Young rider classification	Best Romanian rider	Team classification
P	Tom Sexton	Tom Sexton	Not awarded	Not awarded	Miká Heming	Eduard-Michael Grosu	Bolton Equities Black Spoke Pro Cycling
1	Lucas Carstensen	Eduard-Michael Grosu	Lucas Carstensen	Cormac McGeough	Miká Heming	Eduard-Michael Grosu	Bolton Equities Black Spoke Pro Cycling
2	Daniel Babor	Daniel Babor	Daniel Babor	Cormac McGeough	Miká Heming	Eduard-Michael Grosu	Bolton Equities Black Spoke Pro Cycling
3	Eduard-Michael Grosu	Eduard-Michael Grosu	Eduard-Michael Grosu	Cormac McGeough	Miká Heming	Eduard-Michael Grosu	ATT Investments
4	Jakub Otruba	Mark Stewart	Eduard-Michael Grosu	Cormac McGeough	Miká Heming	Cristian Raileanu	Bolton Equities Black Spoke Pro Cycling
5	Daniel Babor	Mark Stewart	Eduard-Michael Grosu	Cormac McGeough	Miká Heming	Cristian Raileanu	Bolton Equities Black Spoke Pro Cycling
Final		Mark Stewart	Eduard-Michael Grosu	Cormac McGeough	Miká Heming	Cristian Raileanu	Bolton Equities Black Spoke Pro Cycling

== Standings ==
=== General classification ===
General classification (1–10)
Rank	Rider	Team	Time
1	Mark Stewart (GBR)	Bolton Equities Black Spoke Pro Cycling	16h 56' 20"
2	Cristian Raileanu (ROU)	Romania	+ 13"
3	Jakub Otruba (CZE)	Elkov–Kasper	+ 14"
4	Alan Banaszek (POL)	HRE Mazowsze Serce Polski	+ 1' 04"
5	Miká Heming (GER)	ATT Investments	+ 1' 08"
6	Emil Dima (ROU)	Giotti Victoria–Savini Due	+ 1' 11"
7	Natnael Tesfatsion (ERI)	Drone Hopper–Androni Giocattoli	+ 1' 12"
8	Jefferson Alveiro Cepeda (ECU)	Caja Rural–Seguros RGA	+ 1' 13"
9	Nicolas Dalla Valle (ITA)	Giotti Victoria–Savini Due	+ 1' 15"
10	Tomasz Budziński (POL)	HRE Mazowsze Serce Polski	+ 1' 15"

=== Points classification ===
Points classification (1–10)
Rank	Rider	Team	Points
1	Eduard-Michael Grosu (ROU)	Drone Hopper–Androni Giocattoli	68
2	Alan Banaszek (POL)	HRE Mazowsze Serce Polski	49
3	Daniel Babor (CZE)	Elkov–Kasper	47
4	Nicolas Dalla Valle (ITA)	Giotti Victoria–Savini Due	37
5	Joren Bloem (NED)	Abloc CT	32
6	Mark Stewart (GBR)	Bolton Equities Black Spoke Pro Cycling	26
7	Jakub Otruba (CZE)	Elkov–Kasper	25
8	Lucas Carstensen (GER)	Bike Aid	25
9	Cristian Raileanu (ROU)	Abloc CT	24
10	Brendan Rhim (USA)	Wildlife Generation Pro Cycling	20

=== Mountains classification ===
Mountains classification (1–10)
Rank	Rider	Team	Points
1	Cormac McGeough (IRL)	Wildlife Generation Pro Cycling	31
2	Mark Stewart (GBR)	Bolton Equities Black Spoke Pro Cycling	26
3	Jakub Otruba (CZE)	Elkov–Kasper	24
4	Cristian Raileanu (ROU)	Abloc CT	16
5	Robin Plamondon (CAN)	Premier Tech U-23 Cycling Project	14
6	Natnael Tesfatsion (ERI)	Drone Hopper–Androni Giocattoli	14
7	Michal Schuran (CZE)	ATT Investments	12
8	Óscar Sevilla (ESP)	Team Medellín–EPM	12
9	Lucas De Rossi (FRA)	China Glory Continental Cycling Team	10
10	Stijn Appel (NED)	Abloc CT	8

=== Young rider classification ===
Young rider classification (1–10)
Rank	Rider	Team	Time
1	Miká Heming (GER)	ATT Investments	16h 57' 28"
2	Lorenzo Ginestra (ITA)	Work Service–Vitalcare–Vega	+ 23"
3	Jokin Murguialday (ESP)	Caja Rural–Seguros RGA	+ 25"
4	Callum Macleod (GBR)	Abloc CT	+ 25"
5	Philipp Hofbauer (AUT)	WSA KTM Graz p/b Leomo	+ 46"
6	Mattia Gardi (ITA)	Beltrami TSA–Tre Colli	+ 1' 03"
7	Daan Hoeks (NED)	MG.K Vis Colors for Peace VPM	+ 15' 27"
8	Matteo Freddi (ITA)	Beltrami TSA–Tre Colli	+ 15' 47"
9	Ioan Dobrin (ROU)	Mentorise Elite Team CFX	+ 17' 01"
10	Kylian Senicourt (FRA)	Premier Tech U-23 Cycling Project	+ 21' 44"

=== Team classification ===
Team classification (1–10)
Rank	Team	Time
1	Bolton Equities Black Spoke Pro Cycling	50h 51' 54"
2	Elkov–Kasper	+ 23"
3	HRE Mazowsze Serce Polski	+ 55"
4	Caja Rural–Seguros RGA	+ 57"
5	ATT Investments	+ 1' 10"
6	Abloc CT	+ 1' 13"
7	Work Service–Vitalcare–Vega	+ 1' 50"
8	Team Medellín–EPM	+ 1' 56"
9	Wildlife Generation Pro Cycling	+ 2' 35"
10	MG.K Vis Colors for Peace VPM	+ 17' 16"

== See also ==
- 2022 in men's road cycling
- 2022 in sports
