= 2019 Tour of Romania =

2019 UCI Europe Tour
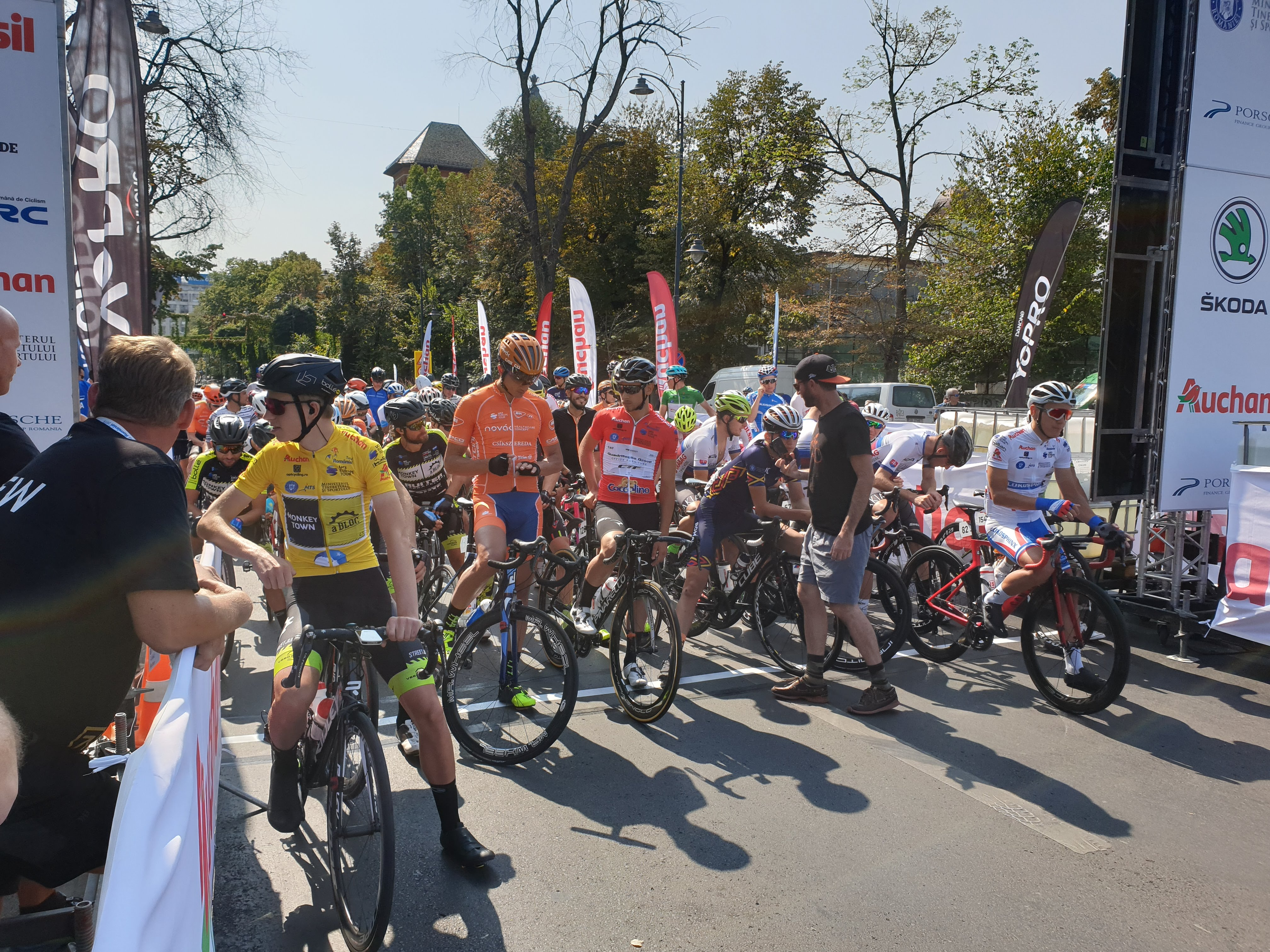
- Riders at the start line of Stage 5

Race details
- Dates: 11–15 September
- Stages: 5
- Distance: 688.0 km (427.5 mi)
- Winning time: 16h 26' 12"

Results
Jersey awarded to the overall winner	Winner	Alex Molenaar (NED)	(Monkey Town–à Bloc)
	Second	Savva Novikov (RUS)	(Lokosphinx)
	Third	Karel Hník (CZE)	(Elkov–Author)
Jersey awarded to the points classification winner	Points	Karl Patrick Lauk (EST)	(Equipe continentale Groupama–FDJ)
Jersey awarded to the mountains classification winner	Mountains	Serghei Țvetcov (ROU)	(Cycling Team Friuli)
	Team	Lokosphinx	

The 2019 Tour of Romania was a five-day cycling stage race that took place in Romania in September 2019. The race was the 52nd edition of the Tour of Romania. The tour was rated as a 2.1 event, as part of the 2019 UCI Europe Tour.

== Route ==
Stages of the 2019 Tour of Romania
Stage	Date	Route	Distance	Type	Winner
1	11 September	Cluj-Napoca to Sighișoara	168 km (104.4 mi)	Plain stage	(Netherlands) Ivar Slik
2	12 September	Brașov to Focșani	176.3 km (109.5 mi)	Mountain stage	(Poland) Stanislaw Aniolkowski
3	13 September	Buzău to Târgoviște	121.6 km (75.6 mi)	Plain stage	(Estonia) Mihkel Räim
4	14 September	Ploiești to Piatra Arsă	126 km (78.3 mi)	Mountain stage	(Russia) Savva Novikov
5	15 September	Bucharest to Bucharest	100.3 km (62.3 mi)	Plain stage	(Poland) Stanislaw Aniolkowski
Total			688 km (427.5 mi)		

== Teams ==
Twenty teams were invited to start the race. These included fourteen UCI Continental teams and six national teams.

UCI Continental teams

- Team Novak
- Voster ATS Team
- Giotti Victoria–Palomar
- LKT Team Brandenburg
- Massi Vivo–Grupo Oresy
- CCC Development Team
- Elkov–Author
- Hurom BDC Development
- Cycling Team Friuli
- Team Illuminate
- Monkey Town–à Bloc
- Vino–Astana Motors
- Kyiv Capital Racing
- Lokosphinx

National teams

- Romania
- Slovakia
- Russia
- Belarus
- Estonia
- Turkey

== Stages ==
=== Stage 1 ===
11 September 2019 — Cluj-Napoca to Sighișoara, 168 km (104 mi)

Result of Stage 1
Rank	Rider	Team	Time
1	Ivar Slik (NED)	Monkey Town–à Bloc	4h 12' 44"
2	Alex Molenaar (NED)	Monkey Town–à Bloc	s.t.
3	Eduard Grosu (ROU)	Romania (national team)	+ 46"
4	Richard Banusch (GER)	LKT Team Brandenburg	s.t.
5	Dominik Neuman (CZE)	Elkov–Author	s.t.

General classification after Stage 1
Rank	Rider	Team	Time
1	Ivar Slik (NED)	Monkey Town–à Bloc	4h 12' 34"
2	Alex Molenaar (NED)	Monkey Town–à Bloc	+ 4"
3	Jonathan Milan (ITA)	Cycling Team Friuli	+ 50"
4	Eduard Grosu (ROU)	Romania (national team)	+ 52"
5	Adriaan Janssen (NED)	Monkey Town–à Bloc	+ 53"

=== Stage 2 ===
12 September 2019 — Brașov to Focșani, 176.3 km (110 mi)

Result of Stage 2
Rank	Rider	Team	Time
1	Stanislaw Aniolkowski (POL)	CCC Development Team	4h 6' 14"
2	Mihkel Räim (EST)	Estonia (national team)	s.t.
3	Eduard Grosu (ROU)	Romania (national team)	s.t.
4	Jonathan Milan (ITA)	Cycling Team Friuli	s.t.
5	Richard Banusch (GER)	LKT Team Brandenburg	s.t.

General classification after Stage 2
Rank	Rider	Team	Time
1	Ivar Slik (NED)	Monkey Town–à Bloc	8h 18' 48"
2	Alex Molenaar (NED)	Monkey Town–à Bloc	+ 4"
3	Stanislaw Aniolkowski (POL)	CCC Development Team	+ 46"
4	Eduard Grosu (ROU)	Romania (national team)	+ 48"
5	Mihkel Räim (EST)	Estonia (national team)	+ 50"

=== Stage 3 ===
13 September 2019 — Buzău to Târgoviște, 121.6 km (76 mi)

Result of Stage 3
Rank	Rider	Team	Time
1	Mihkel Räim (EST)	Estonia (national team)	2h 37' 09"
2	Jonathan Milan (ITA)	Cycling Team Friuli	s.t.
3	Norman Vahtra (EST)	Estonia (national team)	s.t.
4	Siim Kiskonen (EST)	Estonia (national team)	s.t.
5	Stanislaw Aniolkowski (POL)	CCC Development Team	s.t.

General classification after Stage 3
Rank	Rider	Team	Time
1	Ivar Slik (NED)	Monkey Town–à Bloc	10h 55' 57"
2	Alex Molenaar (NED)	Monkey Town–à Bloc	+ 4"
3	Mihkel Räim (EST)	Estonia (national team)	+ 40"
4	Jonathan Milan (ITA)	Cycling Team Friuli	+ 44"
3	Stanislaw Aniolkowski (POL)	CCC Development Team	+ 46"

=== Stage 4 ===
14 September 2019 — Ploiești to Piatra Arsă, 126 km (78 mi)

Result of Stage 4
Rank	Rider	Team	Time
1	Savva Novikov (RUS)	Lokosphinx	3h 16' 06"
2	Karel Hník (CZE)	Elkov–Author	+ 27"
3	Serghei Țvetcov (ROU)	Romania (national team)	s.t.
4	Attila Valter (HUN)	CCC Development Team	s.t.
5	Jan Bárta (CZE)	Elkov–Author	s.t.

General classification after Stage 4
Rank	Rider	Team	Time
1	Alex Molenaar (NED)	Monkey Town–à Bloc	14h 12' 34"
2	Savva Novikov (RUS)	Lokosphinx	+ 15"
3	Karel Hník (CZE)	Elkov–Author	+ 46"
4	Serghei Țvetcov (ROU)	Romania (national team)	+ 48"
5	Jan Bárta (CZE)	Elkov–Author	+ 49"

=== Stage 5 ===
15 September 2019 — Bucharest to Bucharest, 100.3 km (62 mi)

Result of Stage 5
Rank	Rider	Team	Time
1	Stanislaw Aniolkowski (POL)	CCC Development Team	2h 13' 38"
2	Eduard Grosu (ROU)	Romania (national team)	s.t.
3	Riccardo Robbo (ITA)	Team Novak	s.t.
4	Alexandr Smirnov (RUS)	Lokosphinx	s.t.
5	Patryk Stosz (CZE)	CCC Development Team	s.t.

General classification after Stage 5
Rank	Rider	Team	Time
1	Alex Molenaar (NED)	Monkey Town–à Bloc	16h 26' 12"
2	Savva Novikov (RUS)	Lokosphinx	+ 15"
3	Karel Hník (CZE)	Elkov–Author	+ 46"
4	Serghei Țvetcov (ROU)	Romania (national team)	+ 48"
5	Jan Bárta (CZE)	Elkov–Author	+ 49"

== Classification leadership table ==
Classification leadership by stage
Stage	Winner	General classification	Points classification	Mountains classification	Young rider classification	Best Romanian rider	Team classification
1	Ivar Slik	Ivar Slik	Jonathan Milan	Adriaan Janssen	Alex Molenaar	Eduard Grosu	Monkey Town Continental Team
2	Stanislaw Aniolkowski	Ivar Slik	Filippo Ferronato	Patryk Stosz	Alex Molenaar	Eduard Grosu	Monkey Town Continental Team
3	Mihkel Räim	Ivar Slik	Filippo Ferronato	Patryk Stosz	Alex Molenaar	Eduard Grosu	Monkey Town Continental Team
4	Savva Novikov	Alex Molenaar	Filippo Ferronato	Serghei Țvetcov	Alex Molenaar	Serghei Țvetcov	Lokosphinx
5	Stanislaw Aniolkowski	Alex Molenaar	Karl Patrick Lauk	Serghei Țvetcov	Alex Molenaar	Serghei Țvetcov	Lokosphinx
Final		Alex Molenaar	Karl Patrick Lauk	Serghei Țvetcov	Alex Molenaar	Serghei Țvetcov	Lokosphinx

== Standings ==
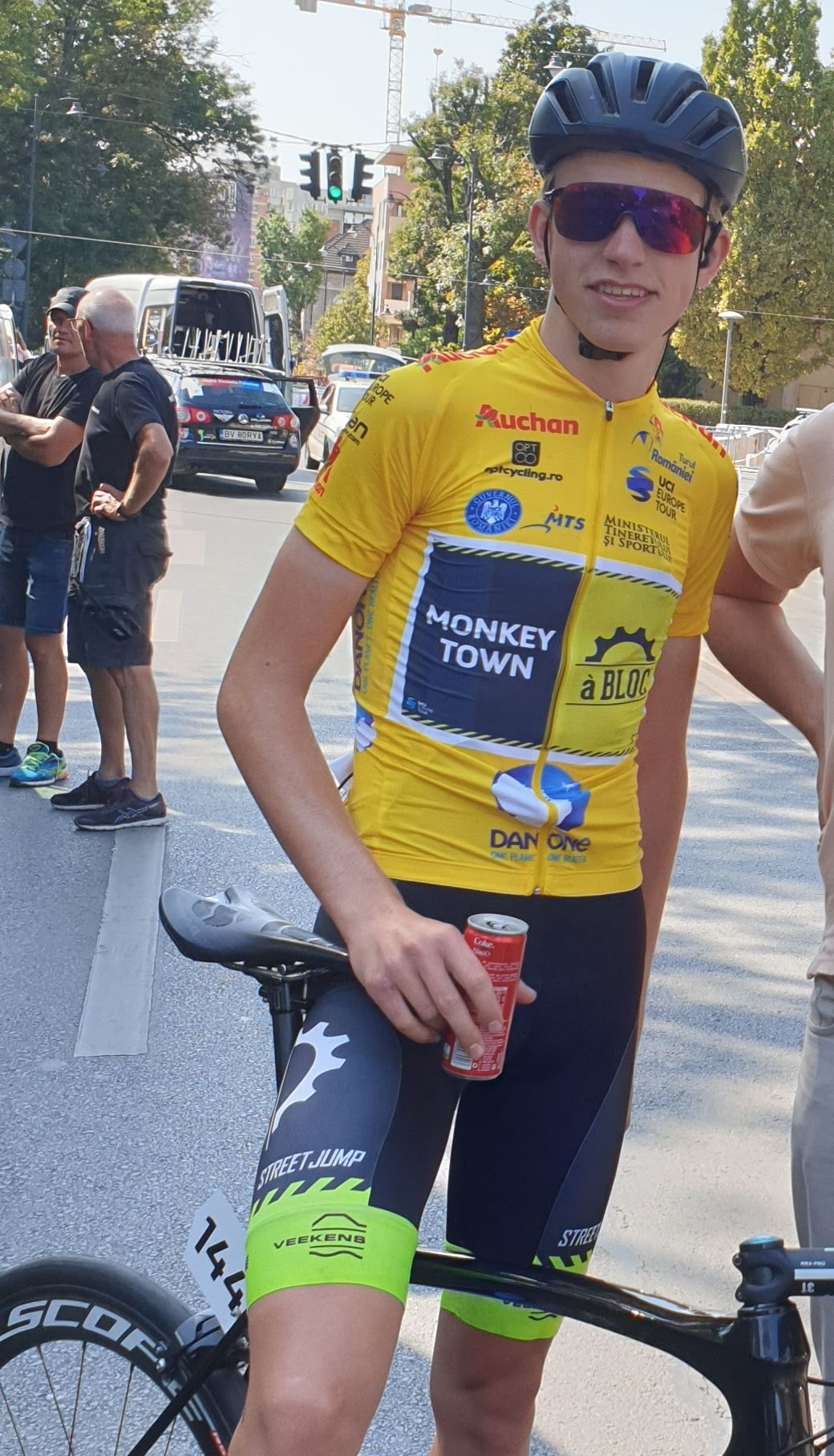
The race winner: Alex Molenaar

Legend
Yellow jersey	Denotes the leader of the general classification	Red jersey	Denotes the leader of the points classification
Green jersey	Denotes the leader of the mountains classification	White jersey	Denotes the leader of the young rider classification
Blue jersey	Denotes the leader of the best Romanian rider classification	Team classification	Denotes the leaders of the team classification

=== General classification ===
General classification (1–10)
Rank	Rider	Team	Time
1	Alex Molenaar (NED)	Monkey Town–à Bloc	16h 26' 12"
2	Savva Novikov (RUS)	Lokosphinx	+ 15"
3	Karel Hník (CZE)	Elkov–Author	+ 46"
4	Serghei Țvetcov (ROU)	Cycling Team Friuli	+ 48"
5	Jan Bárta (CZE)	Elkov–Author	+ 49"
6	Piotr Brożyna (CZE)	CCC Development Team	+ 52"
7	Attila Valter (HUN)	CCC Development Team	+ 52"
8	Emil Dima (ROU)	Giotti Victoria–Palomar	+ 52"
9	Davide Bais (ITA)	Cycling Team Friuli	+ 52"
10	Rodolfo Torres (COL)	Team Illuminate	+ 1' 00"

=== Points classification ===
Points classification (1–5)
Rank	Rider	Team	Points
1	Karl Patrick Lauk (EST)	Equipe continentale Groupama–FDJ	11
2	Filippo Ferronato (ITA)	Cycling Team Friuli	9
3	Sebastian Matusiak (POL)	Poland (national team)	6
4	Jonathan Milan (ITA)	Cycling Team Friuli	6
5	Dániel Móricz (HUN)	Pannon Cycling Team	6

=== Mountains classification ===
Mountains classification (1–5)
Rank	Rider	Team	Points
1	Serghei Țvetcov (ROU)	Cycling Team Friuli	33
2	Jan Bárta (CZE)	Elkov–Author	33
3	Patryk Stosz (CZE)	CCC Development Team	31
4	Savva Novikov (RUS)	Lokosphinx	25
5	Alex Molenaar (NED)	Monkey Town–à Bloc	24

=== Young rider classification ===
Young rider classification (1–5)
Rank	Rider	Team	Time
1	Alex Molenaar (NED)	Monkey Town–à Bloc	16h 26' 12"
2	Savva Novikov (RUS)	Lokosphinx	+ 15"
3	Attila Valter (HUN)	CCC Development Team	+ 52"
4	Emil Dima (ROU)	Giotti Victoria–Palomar	+ 52"
5	Davide Bais (ITA)	Cycling Team Friuli	+ 52"

=== Best Romanian rider classification ===
Best Romanian rider classification (1–10)
Rank	Rider	Team	Time
1	Serghei Țvetcov	Cycling Team Friuli	16h 27' 00"
2	Emil Dima	Giotti Victoria–Palomar	+ 4"
3	Daniel Crista	Giotti Victoria–Palomar	+ 6' 6"
4	Vlad Dobre	Giotti Victoria–Palomar	+ 6' 39"
4	Eduard Grosu	Romania (national team)	+ 16' 26"

=== Team classification ===
Team classification (1–5)
Rank	Team	Time
1	Lokosphinx	49h 21' 30"
2	CCC Development Team	+ 1"
3	Elkov–Author	+ 9"
4	Team Illuminate	+ 2' 10"
5	Cycling Team Friuli	+ 3' 36"

== See also ==
- 2019 in men's road cycling
- 2019 in sports
