= 2026 Tour of Romania =

2026 UCI Europe Tour

Race details
- Dates: 9–13 September
- Stages: 5
- Distance: 821 km (510 mi)
- Winning time: 17h 02' 59"

Results
| Jersey awarded to the overall winner | Winner | Barnabás Vas (HUN) | (Team United Shipping) |
| | Second | Cristian Raileanu (ROU) | (Romania) |
| | Third | András Gusztáv Pakot (HUN) | (Team United Shipping) |
| Jersey awarded to the points classification winner | Points | Barnabás Vas (HUN) | (Team United Shipping) |
| Jersey awarded to the mountains classification winner | Mountains | Barnabás Vas (HUN) | (Team United Shipping) |
| Jersey awarded to the young rider classification winner | Young rider | Barnabás Vas (HUN) | (Team United Shipping) |
| Jersey awarded to the sprints classification winner | Sprints | Andrea Alfio Bruno (ITA) | (Italy) |
| | Team | UC Monaco Team | |

The 2026 Tour of Romania is a five-day cycling stage race that takes place in Romania and Moldova in September 2026. The race is the 58th edition of the Tour of Romania. The tour is rated as a 2.2 event, as part of the 2026 UCI Europe Tour. For the first time in the history of the competition the race started outside Romania, in Moldova.

== Teams ==
21 teams started the race. These included eight Continental teams, five national teams and eight amateur/club teams.

UCI Continental teams

- APS Pro Cycling by Team Cadence Cyclery
- MENtoRISE Teem CCN
- Team United Shipping
- Universe Cycling Team
- Vega–Vitalcare–Dynatek
- Wibatech Lubelskie Perła Polski
- Schwingshandl Intralogistics
- Spor Toto Cycling Team

National teams

- Romania
- Albania
- Poland
- Moldova
- Italy

Amateur teams

- Dinamo - BikeXpert Racing Team
- CSU - Universitatea de Vest din Timișoara
- A. J. Ciclism Eurial Safetycar Cluj
- UC Monaco Team
- Hemus - 1896
- Kings of the Flemish Mountains
- NCF Region Vest
- Team Vassil Levski

== Route ==
Stages of the 2026 Tour of Romania
| Stage | Date | Route | Distance | Type | Winner |
|---|---|---|---|---|---|
| 1 | 9 September | Chișinău (Moldova) to Ungheni (Moldova) | 170 km (110 mi) | Plain stage | (Poland) Radosław Frątczak |
| 2 | 10 September | Iași to Piatra Neamț | 160 km (99 mi) | Plain stage | (Belgium) Rutger Wouters |
| 3 | 11 September | Piatra Neamț to Băile Balvanyos | 200 km (120 mi) | Intermediate stage | (Hungary) Barnabás Vas |
| 4 | 12 September | Brașov to Ploiești | 160 km (99 mi) | Intermediate stage | (Hungary) Barnabás Vas |
| 5 | 13 September | Bucharest (circuit) | 100 km (62 mi) | Plain stage | (Poland) Radosław Frątczak |
| Total | | | | | |

== Stages ==
=== Stage 1 ===
Crossing finish line at Stage 1

9 September 2026 – Chișinău (Moldova) to Ungheni (Moldova), 170.5 km (105.9 mi)

Stage 1 Result
| Rank | Rider | Team | Time |
|---|---|---|---|
| 1 | Radosław Frątczak (POL) | Wibatech Lubelskie Perła Polski | 3h 35' 42" |
| 2 | Liam Punnewaert (BEL) | Kings of the Flemish Mountains | + 0" |
| 3 | Alessio Menghini (ITA) | Italy | + 0" |
| 4 | Christopher Ringkjøb Bruun (NOR) | NCF Region Vest | + 0" |
| 5 | András Gusztáv Pakot (HUN) | Team United Shipping | + 0" |
| 6 | Filippo Dignani (ITA) | Vega–Vitalcare–Dynatek | + 0" |
| 7 | Sander Gysland (NOR) | NCF Region Vest | + 0" |
| 8 | Gerhard-Cristin Moldansky (ROU) | MENtoRISE Teem CCN | + 0" |
| 9 | Gabriele De Fabritiis (ALB) | Albania | + 0" |
| 10 | Wesley Van Dyck (BEL) | Kings of the Flemish Mountains | + 0" |

General classification after Stage 1
| Rank | Rider | Team | Time |
|---|---|---|---|
| 1 | Radosław Frątczak (POL) | Wibatech Lubelskie Perła Polski | 3h 35' 42" |
| 2 | Liam Punnewaert (BEL) | Kings of the Flemish Mountains | + 4" |
| 3 | Alessio Menghini (ITA) | Italy | + 6" |
| 4 | Christopher Ringkjøb Bruun (NOR) | NCF Region Vest | + 10" |
| 5 | András Gusztáv Pakot (HUN) | Team United Shipping | + 10" |
| 6 | Filippo Dignani (ITA) | Vega–Vitalcare–Dynatek | + 10" |
| 7 | Sander Gysland (NOR) | NCF Region Vest | + 10" |
| 8 | Gerhard-Cristin Moldansky (ROU) | MENtoRISE Teem CCN | + 10" |
| 9 | Gabriele De Fabritiis (ALB) | Albania | + 10" |
| 10 | Wesley Van Dyck (BEL) | Kings of the Flemish Mountains | + 10" |

=== Stage 2 ===
10 September 2026 – Iași to Piatra Neamț, 160 km (99 mi)

Stage 2 Result
| Rank | Rider | Team | Time |
|---|---|---|---|
| 1 | Rutger Wouters (BEL) | Kings of the Flemish Mountains | 3h 26' 59" |
| 2 | Ronan O'Connor (IRL) | APS Pro Cycling by Team Cadence Cyclery | + 3" |
| 3 | András Gusztáv Pakot (HUN) | Team United Shipping | + 13" |
| 4 | Enea Sambinello (ITA) | Italy | + 13" |
| 5 | Gabriele De Fabritiis (ALB) | Albania | + 13" |
| 6 | Luca Fraticelli (ITA) | Vega–Vitalcare–Dynatek | + 13" |
| 7 | Cristian Raileanu (ROU) | Romania | + 13" |
| 8 | Lorenzo Basso (ITA) | UC Monaco | + 13" |
| 9 | Luca Bagnara (ITA) | Vega–Vitalcare–Dynatek | + 13" |
| 10 | Mykhailo Basaraba (UKR) | UC Monaco | + 13" |

General classification after Stage 2
| Rank | Rider | Team | Time |
|---|---|---|---|
| 1 | Rutger Wouters (BEL) | Kings of the Flemish Mountains | 7h 02' 31" |
| 2 | Ronan O'Connor (IRL) | APS Pro Cycling by Team Cadence Cyclery | + 7" |
| 3 | András Gusztáv Pakot (HUN) | Team United Shipping | + 19" |
| 4 | Gabriele De Fabritiis (ALB) | Albania | + 23" |
| 5 | Cristian Raileanu (ROU) | Romania | + 23" |
| 6 | Mykhailo Basaraba (UKR) | UC Monaco | + 23" |
| 7 | Enea Sambinello (ITA) | Italy | + 23" |
| 8 | Luca Fraticelli (ITA) | Vega–Vitalcare–Dynatek | + 23" |
| 9 | Lorenzo Basso (ITA) | UC Monaco | + 23" |
| 10 | Iustin-Ioan Văidian (ROU) | MENtoRISE Teem CCN | + 26" |

=== Stage 3 ===
11 September 2026 – Piatra Neamț to Băile Balvanyos, 200 km (120 mi)

Stage 3 Result
| Rank | Rider | Team | Time |
|---|---|---|---|
| 1 | Barnabás Vas (HUN) | Team United Shipping | 4h 26' 54" |
| 2 | Enea Sambinello (ITA) | Italy | + 0" |
| 3 | András Gusztáv Pakot (HUN) | Team United Shipping | + 0" |
| 4 | Mattew-Denis Piciu (ROU) | MENtoRISE Teem CCN | + 0" |
| 5 | Tord Aasgaard Wikander (NOR) | NCF Region Vest | + 0" |
| 6 | Jaume Barcelo Gascon (ESP) | UC Monaco | + 0" |
| 7 | Kevin Andrés Estupiñán (COL) | UC Monaco | + 0" |
| 8 | Mykhailo Basaraba (UKR) | UC Monaco | + 0" |
| 9 | Luca Fraticelli (ITA) | Vega–Vitalcare–Dynatek | + 0" |
| 10 | Luca Bagnara (ITA) | Vega–Vitalcare–Dynatek | + 0" |

General classification after Stage 3
| Rank | Rider | Team | Time |
|---|---|---|---|
| 1 | András Gusztáv Pakot (HUN) | Team United Shipping | 11h 29' 40" |
| 2 | Enea Sambinello (ITA) | Italy | + 2" |
| 3 | Ronan O'Connor (IRL) | APS Pro Cycling by Team Cadence Cyclery | + 2" |
| 4 | Mykhailo Basaraba (UKR) | UC Monaco | + 8" |
| 5 | Luca Fraticelli (ITA) | Vega–Vitalcare–Dynatek | + 8" |
| 6 | Cristian Raileanu (ROU) | Romania | + 13" |
| 7 | Rutger Wouters (BEL) | Kings of the Flemish Mountains | + 18" |
| 8 | Barnabás Vas (HUN) | Team United Shipping | 20" |
| 9 | Iustin-Ioan Văidian (ROU) | MENtoRISE Teem CCN | + 27" |
| 10 | Jaume Barcelo Gascon (ESP) | UC Monaco | + 30" |

=== Stage 4 ===
12 September 2026 – Brașov to Ploiești, 160 km (99 mi)

Stage 4 Result
| Rank | Rider | Team | Time |
|---|---|---|---|
| 1 | Barnabás Vas (HUN) | Team United Shipping | 3h 32' 42" |
| 2 | Cristian Raileanu (ROU) | Romania | + 16" |
| 3 | Enea Sambinello (ITA) | Italy | + 38" |
| 4 | Jaume Barcelo Gascon (ESP) | UC Monaco | + 38" |
| 5 | Lorenzo Basso (ITA) | UC Monaco | + 38" |
| 6 | Andrea Alfio Bruno (ITA) | Italy | + 38" |
| 7 | Mykhailo Basaraba (UKR) | UC Monaco | + 38" |
| 8 | Mustafa Tekin (TUR) | Spor Toto Cycling Team | + 38" |
| 9 | Mattew-Denis Piciu (ROU) | MENtoRISE Teem CCN | + 38" |
| 10 | Tord Aasgaard Wikander (NOR) | NCF Region Vest | + 38" |

General classification after Stage 4
| Rank | Rider | Team | Time |
|---|---|---|---|
| 1 | Barnabás Vas (HUN) | Team United Shipping | 15h 02' 32" |
| 2 | Cristian Raileanu (ROU) | Romania | + 13" |
| 3 | Enea Sambinello (ITA) | Italy | + 26" |
| 4 | András Gusztáv Pakot (HUN) | Team United Shipping | + 28" |
| 5 | Ronan O'Connor (IRL) | APS Pro Cycling by Team Cadence Cyclery | + 30" |
| 6 | Mykhailo Basaraba (UKR) | UC Monaco | + 36" |
| 7 | Luca Fraticelli (ITA) | Vega–Vitalcare–Dynatek | + 36" |
| 8 | Jaume Barcelo Gascon (ESP) | UC Monaco | + 58" |
| 9 | Mattew-Denis Piciu (ROU) | MENtoRISE Teem CCN | + 58" |
| 10 | Kevin Andrés Estupiñán (COL) | UC Monaco | + 58" |

=== Stage 5 ===
13 September 2026 – Bucharest (circuit), 100 km (62 mi)

Stage 5 Result
| Rank | Rider | Team | Time |
|---|---|---|---|
| 1 | Radosław Frątczak (POL) | Wibatech Lubelskie Perła Polski | 2h 00' 27" |
| 2 | András Gusztáv Pakot (HUN) | Team United Shipping | + 0" |
| 3 | Christopher Ringkjøb Bruun (NOR) | NCF Region Vest | + 0" |
| 4 | Liam Punnewaert (BEL) | Kings of the Flemish Mountains | + 0" |
| 5 | Alessio Menghini (ITA) | Italy | + 0" |
| 6 | Gabriele De Fabritiis (ALB) | Albania | + 0" |
| 7 | Fabian Steininger (AUT) | Schwingshandl Intralogistics | + 0" |
| 8 | Bartłomiej Proć (POL) | Wibatech Lubelskie Perła Polski | + 0" |
| 9 | Filippo Dignani (ITA) | Vega–Vitalcare–Dynatek | + 0" |
| 10 | Sander Gysland (NOR) | NCF Region Vest | + 0" |

General classification after Stage 5
| Rank | Rider | Team | Time |
|---|---|---|---|
| 1 | Barnabás Vas (HUN) | Team United Shipping | 17h 02' 59" |
| 2 | Cristian Raileanu (ROU) | Romania | + 13" |
| 3 | András Gusztáv Pakot (HUN) | Team United Shipping | + 22" |
| 4 | Enea Sambinello (ITA) | Italy | + 26" |
| 5 | Ronan O'Connor (IRL) | APS Pro Cycling by Team Cadence Cyclery | + 30" |
| 6 | Mykhailo Basaraba (UKR) | UC Monaco | + 36" |
| 7 | Luca Fraticelli (ITA) | Vega–Vitalcare–Dynatek | + 36" |
| 8 | Jaume Barcelo Gascon (ESP) | UC Monaco | + 58" |
| 9 | Mattew-Denis Piciu (ROU) | MENtoRISE Teem CCN | + 58" |
| 10 | Kevin Andrés Estupiñán (COL) | UC Monaco | + 58" |

== Classification leadership table ==
Classification leadership by stage
| Stage | Winner | General classification | Points classification | Mountains classification | Intermediate sprints classification | Young rider classification | Best Romanian rider classification | Team classification |
|---|---|---|---|---|---|---|---|---|
| 1 | Radosław Frątczak | Radosław Frątczak | Radosław Frątczak | Barnabás Vas | Roberto Capello | Liam Punnewaert | Gerhard-Cristin Moldansky | Wibatech Lubelskie Perła Polski |
| 2 | Rutger Wouters | Rutger Wouters | Rutger Wouters | Barnabás Vas | Roberto Capello | András Gusztáv Pakot | Cristian Raileanu | UC Monaco |
| 3 | Barnabás Vas | András Gusztáv Pakot | Rutger Wouters | Barnabás Vas | Andrea Alfio Bruno | András Gusztáv Pakot | Cristian Raileanu | UC Monaco |
| 4 | Barnabás Vas | Barnabás Vas | Barnabás Vas | Barnabás Vas | Andrea Alfio Bruno | Barnabás Vas | Cristian Raileanu | UC Monaco |
| 5 | Radosław Frątczak | Barnabás Vas | Barnabás Vas | Barnabás Vas | Andrea Alfio Bruno | Barnabás Vas | Cristian Raileanu | UC Monaco |
| Final | | Barnabás Vas | Barnabás Vas | Barnabás Vas | Andrea Alfio Bruno | Barnabás Vas | Cristian Raileanu | UC Monaco |

== Standings ==
Legend
| Yellow jersey | Denotes the leader of the general classification | Polka dot jersey | Denotes the leader of the points classification |
| Green jersey | Denotes the leader of the mountains classification | White jersey | Denotes the leader of the young rider classification |
| Red jersey | Denotes the leader of the intermediate sprints classification | Blue jersey | Denotes the leader of the best Romanian rider classification |
| Team classification | Denotes the leaders of the team classification | | |

=== General classification ===
Barnabas Vas in the Green jersey

Final general classification
| Rank | Rider | Team | Time |
|---|---|---|---|
| 1 | Barnabás Vas (HUN) | Team United Shipping | 17h 02' 59" |
| 2 | Cristian Raileanu (ROU) | Romania | + 13" |
| 3 | András Gusztáv Pakot (HUN) | Team United Shipping | + 22" |
| 4 | Enea Sambinello (ITA) | Italy | + 26" |
| 5 | Ronan O'Connor (IRL) | APS Pro Cycling by Team Cadence Cyclery | + 30" |
| 6 | Mykhailo Basaraba (UKR) | UC Monaco | + 36" |
| 7 | Luca Fraticelli (ITA) | Vega–Vitalcare–Dynatek | + 36" |
| 8 | Jaume Barcelo Gascon (ESP) | UC Monaco | + 58" |
| 9 | Mattew-Denis Piciu (ROU) | MENtoRISE Teem CCN | + 58" |
| 10 | Kevin Andrés Estupiñán (COL) | UC Monaco | + 58" |

=== Points classification ===
Final points classification
| Rank | Rider | Team | |
|---|---|---|---|
| 1 | Barnabás Vas (HUN) | Team United Shipping | 62 |
| 2 | András Gusztáv Pakot (HUN) | Team United Shipping | 59 |
| 3 | Radosław Frątczak (POL) | Wibatech Lubelskie Perła Polski | 56 |
| 4 | Enea Sambinello (ITA) | Italy | 47 |
| 5 | Rutger Wouters (BEL) | Kings of the Flemish Mountains | 41 |
| 6 | Cristian Raileanu (ROU) | Romania | 38 |
| 7 | Andrea Alfio Bruno (ITA) | Italy | 36 |
| 8 | Liam Punnewaert (BEL) | Kings of the Flemish Mountains | 32 |
| 9 | Christopher Ringkjøb Bruun (NOR) | NCF Region Vest | 27 |
| 10 | Mattew-Denis Piciu (ROU) | MENtoRISE Teem CCN | 26 |

=== Mountains classification ===
Final mountains classification
| Rank | Rider | Team | |
|---|---|---|---|
| 1 | Barnabás Vas (HUN) | Team United Shipping | 35 |
| 2 | Kevin Andrés Estupiñán (COL) | UC Monaco | 12 |
| 3 | Andrea Alfio Bruno (ITA) | Italy | 10 |
| 4 | Enea Sambinello (ITA) | Italy | 10 |
| 5 | Mustafa Tekin (TUR) | Spor Toto Cycling Team | 6 |
| 6 | Roberto Capello (ITA) | Italy | 4 |
| 7 | Ethan Dunham (USA) | APS Pro Cycling by Team Cadence Cyclery | 4 |
| 8 | Catalin Buta (ROU) | MENtoRISE Teem CCN | 3 |
| 9 | Matthew Walls (IRL) | APS Pro Cycling by Team Cadence Cyclery | 2 |
| 10 | Zétény Szijártó (HUN) | Team United Shipping | 2 |

=== Young rider classification ===
Final young rider classification
| Rank | Rider | Team | Time |
|---|---|---|---|
| 1 | Barnabás Vas (HUN) | Team United Shipping | 17h 02' 59" |
| 2 | András Gusztáv Pakot (HUN) | Team United Shipping | + 22" |
| 3 | Enea Sambinello (ITA) | Italy | + 26" |
| 4 | Mykhailo Basaraba (UKR) | UC Monaco | + 36" |
| 5 | Luca Fraticelli (ITA) | Vega–Vitalcare–Dynatek | + 36" |
| 6 | Jaume Barcelo Gascon (ESP) | UC Monaco | + 58" |
| 7 | Kevin Andrés Estupiñán (COL) | UC Monaco | + 58" |
| 8 | Tord Aasgaard Wikander (NOR) | NCF Region Vest | + 1' 18" |
| 9 | Roberto Capello (ITA) | Italy | + 1' 27" |
| 10 | Nicolas Milesi (ITA) | Italy | + 2' 37" |

=== Best Romanian rider classification ===
Final best Romanian rider classification
| Rank | Rider | Team | Time |
|---|---|---|---|
| 1 | Cristian Raileanu (ROU) | Romania | 17h 03' 12" |
| 2 | Mattew-Denis Piciu (ROU) | MENtoRISE Teem CCN | + 45" |
| 3 | Catalin Buta (ROU) | MENtoRISE Teem CCN | + 5' 08" |
| 4 | Andrei Carbunarea (ROU) | Romania | + 7' 02" |
| 5 | Patrick Pescaru (ROU) | Romania | + 7' 07" |
| 6 | Gerhard-Cristin Moldansky (ROU) | MENtoRISE Teem CCN | + 7' 33" |
| 7 | Iustin-Ioan Văidian (ROU) | MENtoRISE Teem CCN | + 7' 52" |
| 8 | Victor-Alexandru Aron (ROU) | Dinamo - BikeXpert Racing Team | + 13 '52" |
| 9 | Catalin-Luca Campean (ROU) | Team United Shipping | + 15' 15" |
| 10 | Horea-Stefan Precup (ROU) | Romania | + 15' 17" |

=== Intermediate sprints classification ===
Final intermediate sprints classification
| Rank | Rider | Team | |
|---|---|---|---|
| 1 | Andrea Alfio Bruno (ITA) | Italy | 28 |
| 2 | Roberto Capello (ITA) | Italy | 16 |
| 3 | Rutger Wouters (BEL) | Kings of the Flemish Mountains | 16 |
| 4 | Andrei Carbunarea (ROU) | Romania | 16 |
| 5 | Barnabás Vas (HUN) | Team United Shipping | 12 |
| 6 | Gregor Matija Černe (SLO) | Hemus - 1896 | 10 |
| 7 | Mattew-Denis Piciu (ROU) | MENtoRISE Teem CCN | 10 |
| 8 | Cristian Raileanu (ROU) | Romania | 8 |
| 9 | Patrick Pescaru (ROU) | Romania | 6 |
| 10 | Radosław Frątczak (POL) | Wibatech Lubelskie Perła Polski | 6 |

=== Team classification ===
Final team classification (1–10)
| Rank | Team | Time |
|---|---|---|
| 1 | UC Monaco | 51h 11' 07" |
| 2 | Italy | + 2' 06" |
| 3 | (Italy) Vega–Vitalcare–Dynatek | + 6' 17" |
| 4 | (Hungary) Team United Shipping | + 6' 49" |
| 5 | (United States) APS Pro Cycling by Team Cadence Cyclery | + 10' 53" |
| 6 | (Romania) MENtoRISE Teem CCN | + 11' 16" |
| 7 | Romania | + 12' 44" |
| 8 | (Norway) NCF Region Vest | + 25' 06" |
| 9 | (Austria) Schwingshandl Intralogistics | + 27' 14" |
| 10 | (Poland) Wibatech Lubelskie Perła Polski | + 29' 27" |

== See also ==
- 2026 in men's road cycling
- 2026 in sports
