= Romanian National Road Race Championships =

National road cycling championship in Romania

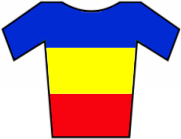
- The champion's jersey

Race details
- Date: June
- Discipline: Road
- Type: One-day race
- Organiser: Romanian Cycling Federation

History
- First edition: 1998

The Romanian National Road Race Championships are held annually to decide the cycling champions in both road race discipline, across various categories.

== Men ==
Year	Gold	Silver	Bronze
1998	Emil Pavel Lupas	Ovidiu Burghelea	George Prisecariu
1999	Not held		
2000	Emil Pavel Lupas	Florin Privache	
2001	Marian Munteanu	Dan Viorel Danila	Emil Pavel Lupas
2002– 2004	Not held		
2005	Dan Diaconu	Alexandru Ciocan	Cosmin Bidilici
2006	Marian Frunzeanu	George Daniel Anghelache	Lars Pria
2007	Tamas Csicsaky	George Daniel Anghelache	Carol-Eduard Novak
2008	Alexandru Ciocan	Andrei Nechita	George Daniel Anghelache
2009	Andrei Nechita	Gabriel Pop	Alexandru Ciocan
2010	Andrei Nechita	Mihai-Gabriel Varabiev	Marian Frunzeanu
2011	Andrei Nechita	Alexandru Ciocan	Marius Petrache
2012	Zoltán Sipos	Valentin Plesea	Carol-Eduard Novak
2013	Andrei Nechita	Marian Frunzeanu	Andrei Voicu
2014	Zoltán Sipos	Andrei Nechita	Marian Frunzeanu
2015	Serghei Țvetcov	Marius Petrache	Andrei Nechita
2016	Marius Petrache	Daniel Crista	Serghei Țvetcov
2017	Marius Petrache	Valentin Plesea	Emil Dima
2018	Eduard-Michael Grosu	Daniel Crista	Emil Dima
2019	Denis Vulcan	Vlad Dobre	Marius Petrache
2020	Daniel Crista	Serghei Țvetcov	Eduard-Michael Grosu
2021	Serghei Țvetcov	Eduard-Michael Grosu	Daniel Crista
2022	Emil Dima	Valentin Plesea	Serghei Țvetcov
2023	Serghei Țvetcov	Valentin Plesea	Daniel Crista
2024	Cristian Raileanu	Emil Dima	Valentin Plesea
2025	Gerhard Moldansky	Catalin Buta	Campean Catalin-Luca
2026	Cristian Raileanu	Horea Stefan Precup	Andrei Carbunarea

=== Under-23 ===
Year	Gold	Silver	Bronze
2009	Andrei Nechita	Mihail Rusu	Eduard-Michael Grosu
2010	Andrei Nechita	Mihai-Gabriel Varabiev	Lucian Voinea
2011	Mihai-Gabriel Varabiev	Bogdan Coman	Lucian Voinea
2012	Zoltán Sipos	Valentin Plesea	Eduard-Michael Grosu
2013	Andrei Voicu	Lucian Oprea	Szabolcs Sebestyén
2014	Eduard-Michael Grosu	Valentin Plesea	Adrian Zamfir
2015	Vlad Nicolae Dobre	Nicola Andrei Barbu	Ionut-Adrian Sdraila
2016	Emil Dima	Vlad Dobre	Dorin Alexandru Tescanu
2017	Emil Dima	Vlad Dobre	Leonard Barbu
2018	Emil Dima	Raul-Antonio Sinza	Lorant Balazsi
2019	Denis Vulcan	Valentin Vasiloiu	Emil Dima
2020	Iustin-Ioan Văidian	Adi Narcis Marcu	Gerhard-Cristin Moldansky
2021	Andrei Ionut	Raul-Antonio Sinza	Adi Narcis Marcu
2022	Adi Narcis Marcu	Mattew-Denis Piciu	Iustin-Ioan Văidian
2023	Mihnea-Alexandru Harasim	Mattew-Denis Piciu	Iustin-Ioan Văidian
2024	Andrei Carbunarea	Mattew-Denis Piciu	Ioan Dobrin
2025	Catalin Buta	Campean Catalin-Luca	Horea-Stefan Precup

== Women ==
Year	Gold
2008	Eniko Nagy
2009	Eniko Nagy
2010	Eniko Nagy
2011	Beata Adrienne Piringer
2012	Not held
2013	Beata Adrienne Piringer
2014	Lavinia Rolea
2015	Ana Maria Covrig
2016	Ana Maria Covrig
2017	Ana Maria Covrig
2018	Ana Maria Covrig
2019	Ana Maria Covrig
2020	Manuela Mureșan
2021	Georgeta Ungureanu
2022	Manuela Mureșan
2023	Georgeta Ungureanu
2024	Manuela Mureșan
2025	Manuela Mureșan
2026	Iana Alesia Baltes

== See also ==
- Romanian National Time Trial Championships
- National road cycling championships
