= Lavinia Rolea =

Romanian cyclist (born 1986)

Personal information
- Full name: Nicoleta-Lavinia Rolea
- Born: 10 October 1986 (age 40) Romania

Cycling career
- Sport: Cycling
- Discipline: Road
- Role: Rider

Amateur team
- 2015–2017: Auber93

Nicoleta-Lavinia Rolea (born 10 October 1986) is a Romanian racing cyclist. She rode at the 2014 UCI Road World Championships, having won the Romanian National Road Race Championships earlier in the year, but failed to finish in Ponferrada. She also finished second twice in the National Road Race Championships (2008 and 2015), and was a three-time runner-up in the Romanian National Time Trial Championships, in 2009, 2014 and 2015.
