= Federico Zurlo =

Italian cyclist (born 1994)

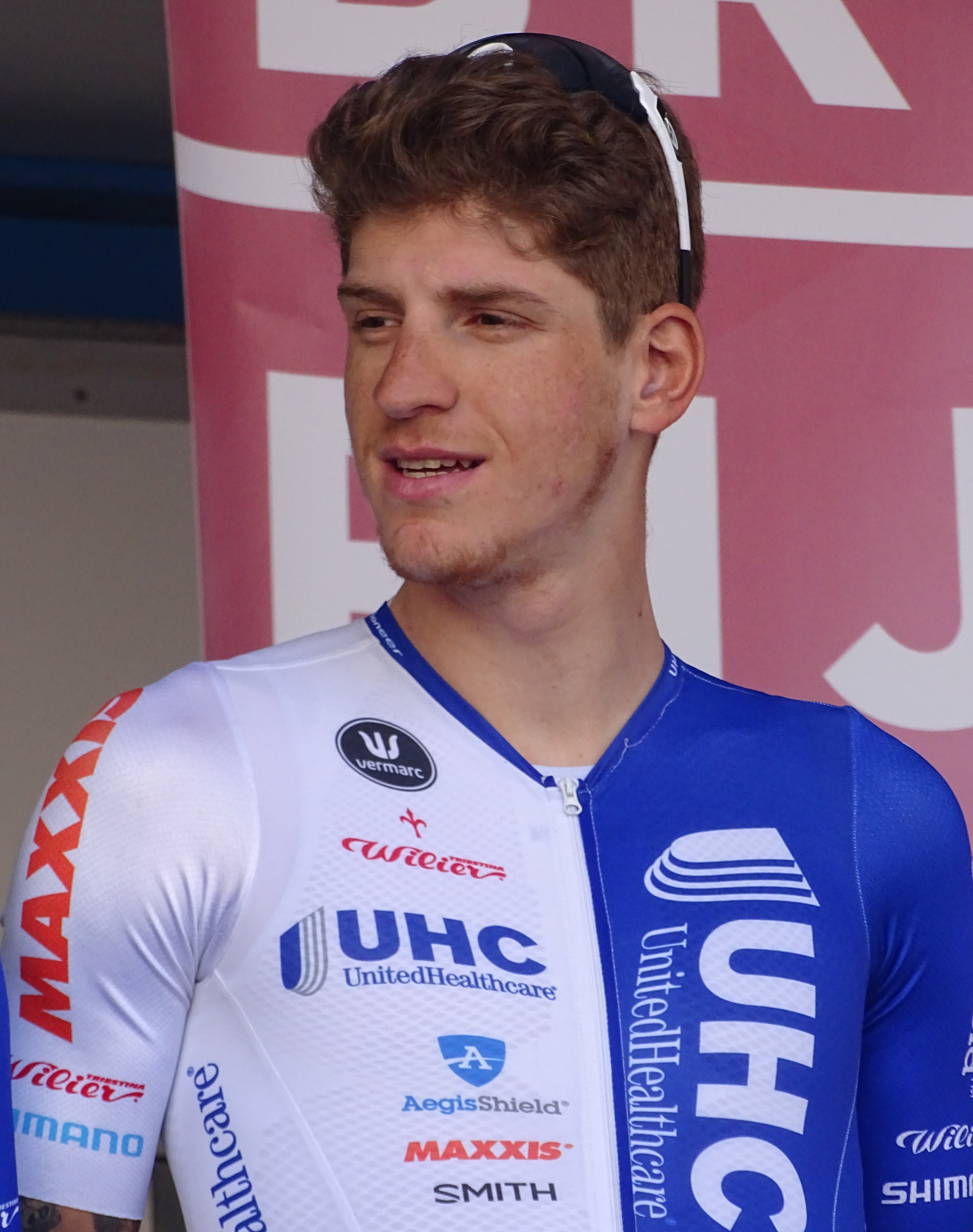
- Zurlo in 2015.

Personal information
- Full name: Federico Zurlo
- Born: 25 February 1994 (age 32) Cittadella, Veneto, Italy

Cycling career
- Sport: Cycling
- Current team: Retired
- Discipline: Road
- Role: Rider

Amateur teams
- 2009–2012: Postumia 73 Dino Liviero
- 2013–2014: Zalf–Euromobil–Désirée–Fior
- 2014: UnitedHealthcare (stagiaire)

Professional teams
- 2015: UnitedHealthcare
- 2016–2017: Lampre–Merida
- 2018–2020: MsTina–Focus

Federico Zurlo (born 25 February 1994) is an Italian former professional racing cyclist, who rode professionally between 2015 and 2020 for the UnitedHealthcare, UAE Team Emirates and Giotti Victoria teams. He was named in the startlist for the 2016 Vuelta a España, but he withdrew on stage 4.

== Major results ==
2012
4th Road race, UCI Junior Road World Championships
5th Overall Giro della Lunigiana
7th Paris–Roubaix Juniors
2013
Coupe des nations Ville Saguenay

1st Young rider classification
1st Stage 3

2014
7th Memorial Marco Pantani
2016
10th Overall Tour of Qinghai Lake

1st Stage 7

2019
Tour of Japan

1st Points classification
1st Stage 5

1st Stage 3 Tour de Kumano
4th Overall Tour of Szeklerland
5th Giro dell'Appennino
2020
7th Overall Tour of Antalya

=== Grand Tour general classification results timeline ===
Grand Tour	2016	2017
Giro d'Italia	—	—
Tour de France	—	—
Vuelta a España	DNF	149

Legend
—	Did not compete
DNF	Did not finish
