= Miká Heming =

German cyclist

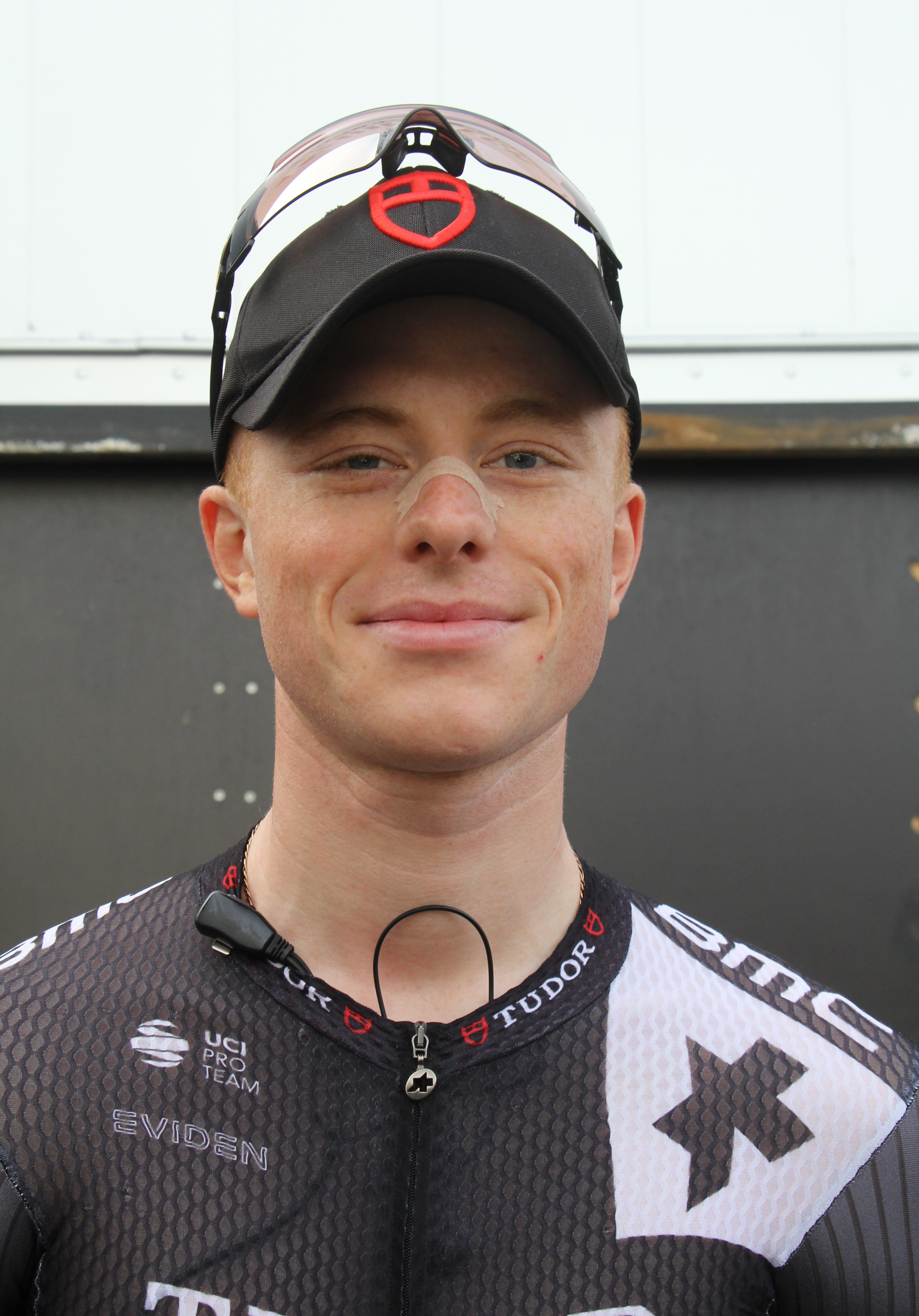
- Heming in 2023

Personal information
- Born: 6 April 2000 (age 26) Ahaus, North Rhine-Westphalia, Germany
- Height: 1.83 m (6 ft 0 in)
- Weight: 68 kg (150 lb; 10 st 10 lb)

Cycling career
- Sport: Cycling
- Current team: Tudor Pro Cycling Team
- Discipline: Road
- Role: Rider

Professional teams
- 2019: Dauner–Akkon
- 2020–2021: Maloja Pushbikers
- 2022: ATT Investments
- 2023–: Tudor Pro Cycling Team

Miká Heming (born 6 April 2000) is a German racing cyclist, who currently rides for UCI ProTeam Tudor Pro Cycling Team.

== Major results ==
2020
1st Mountains classification, Belgrade–Banja Luka
2021
5th International Rhodes Grand Prix
10th Poreč Trophy
2022
1st Stage 3 International Tour of Rhodes
3rd Overall Flèche du Sud
3rd Overall Baltic Chain Tour
5th Overall Tour of Romania

1st Young rider classification

5th International Rhodes Grand Prix
5th Visegrad 4 Kerékpárverseny
6th Overall Carpathian Couriers Race

1st Stage 2

6th Overall Gemenc Grand Prix
8th Grand Prix Herning
9th Visegrad 4 Bicycle Race – GP Slovakia
2024
9th Veenendaal–Veenendaal
