= Andrei Nechita =

Romanian professional road racing cyclist

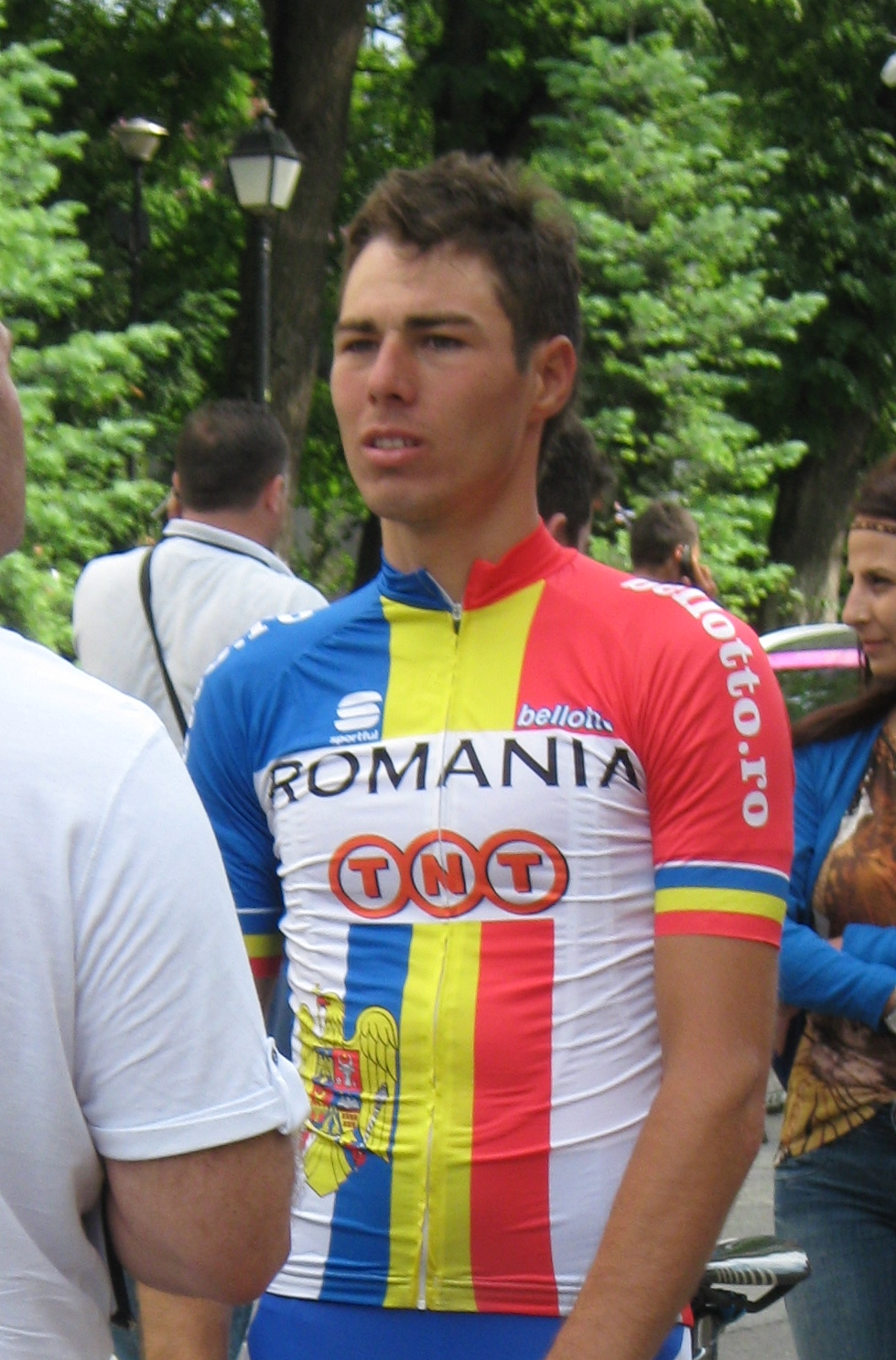
- Nechita at the 2012 Tour of Romania

Personal information
- Full name: Andrei Nechita
- Born: 29 May 1988 (age 38) Vaslui, Romania

Cycling career
- Sport: Cycling
- Current team: Retired
- Discipline: Road
- Role: Rider

Amateur teams
- 2007: A.S.D. Team Molino Di Ferro
- 2009: Marchiol–Pasta Montegrappa–Site–Heraclia
- 2010: Reale Mutua
- 2011: U.C. Trevigiani–Dynamon–Bottoli
- 2012: Fausto Coppi Gazzera
- 2013: Zalf Euromobil Désirée Fior

Professional teams
- 2014: MG Kvis–Trevigiani
- 2015–2016: Tuşnad Cycling Team

Major wins
- One-day races and Classics National Road Race Championships (2010, 2011, 2013) National Time Trial Championships (2011–2014)

Andrei Nechita (born 29 May 1988) is a Romanian former professional road racing cyclist, who rode professionally between 2014 and 2016 for the MG Kvis–Wilier and Tuşnad Cycling Team teams.

== Major results ==
2006
9th Trofeo San Rocco
2008
2nd Road race, National Road Championships
7th Trofeo Alcide Degasperi
8th Road race, UEC European Under-23 Road Championships
2009
1st Road race, National Under-23 Road Championships
2010
National Road Championships

1st Road race
1st Under-23 road race

3rd Coppa della Pace
4th Trofeo Alcide Degasperi
2011
National Road Championships

1st Road race
1st Time trial

1st Overall Tour of Romania
2012
1st Time trial, National Road Championships
Tour of Szeklerland

1st Points classification
1st Stage 4b

5th Overall Tour of Trakya
5th Overall Tour of Romania
9th Memorial Davide Fardelli
2013
National Road Championships

1st Road race
1st Time trial

5th Overall Tour of Szeklerland

1st Romanian rider classification

5th Coppa della Pace
2014
National Road Championships

1st Time trial
2nd Road race

2015
National Road Championships

3rd Road race
3rd Time trial

7th Overall Black Sea Cycling Tour
8th Overall Tour of Szeklerland
10th Overall Tour of Małopolska
2016
1st Prologue Sibiu Cycling Tour
