= Tomasz Budziński =

Polish cyclist

Personal information
- Born: 24 April 1998 (age 28) Opoczno, Poland
- Height: 1.77 m (5 ft 10 in)
- Weight: 69 kg (152 lb)

Cycling career
- Sport: Cycling
- Current team: Mazowsze Serce Polski
- Discipline: Road
- Role: Rider

Professional teams
- 2019: Hurom BDC Development
- 2020: Wibatech Merx 7R
- 2021–: Mazowsze Serce Polski

Tomasz Budziński (born 24 April 1998) is a Polish professional racing cyclist, who rides for UCI Continental team Mazowsze Serce Polski. His twin brother Marcin is also a professional cyclist on the same team.

== Major results ==
2021
4th Memoriał Henryka Łasaka
6th Overall CCC Tour - Grody Piastowskie
Visegrad 4 Bicycle Race

8th GP Slovakia
9th GP Czech Republic

2022
1st Memoriał Henryka Łasaka
2nd Overall Course de Solidarność et des Champions Olympiques
5th GP Slovakia, Visegrad 4 Bicycle Race
10th Overall Tour of Romania
2023
2nd Overall Tour of Tai Yuan

1st Stage 1

3rd Overall Tour of Poyang Lake
2024
2nd GP Polski
6th Overall Tour de Kurpie

1st Stage 3 (TTT)

9th Overall Tour of Malopolska
