= Savva Novikov =

Russian cyclist

Personal information
- Full name: Savva Novikov
- Born: 27 July 1999 (age 27)

Cycling career
- Sport: Cycling
- Current team: Cycling Sport Club Olymp
- Discipline: Road
- Role: Rider

Amateur team
- 2023–: Cycling Sport Club Olymp

Professional teams
- 2018–2019: Lokosphinx
- 2020: CCC Development Team
- 2021–2022: Equipo Kern Pharma

Savva Novikov (born 27 July 1999) is a Russian cyclist, who currently rides for Russian amateur team Cycling Sport Club Olymp.

== Major results ==
2018
2nd Team pursuit, National Track Championships
2019
1st Overall Tour of Iran (Azerbaijan)

1st Young rider classification
1st Stage 3

2nd Overall Tour of Romania

1st Stage 4

3rd Points race, UEC European Under-23 Track Championships
3rd Gran Premio Industria e Commercio Artigianato Carnaghese
2020
2nd Grand Prix World's Best High Altitude
5th Overall Tour of Mevlana
5th Grand Prix Mount Erciyes 2200 mt
7th Road race, National Road Championships
9th Grand Prix Velo Erciyes
9th Grand Prix Central Anatolia
2021
3rd Overall Istrian Spring Trophy
2023
3rd Syedra Ancient City
4th Overall Five Rings of Moscow
