= Romanian National Time Trial Championships =

Cycling championship in Romania

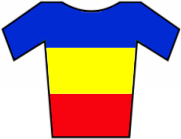
- The champion's jersey

Race details
- Date: June
- Discipline: Road
- Type: One-day race
- Organiser: Romanian Cycling Federation

History
- First edition: 1998

The Romanian National Time Trial Championships are held annually to decide the cycling champions in the time trial discipline, across various categories.

== Men ==
=== Elite ===
Year	Gold	Silver	Bronze
1998	Emil Pavel Lupas	Gabriel Neagoe	Florin Privache
1999	Emil Pavel Lupas	Florin Privache	Francesco-Horia Geovane
2000	Emil Pavel Lupas	Gabriel Neagoe	Florin Privache
2001	Emil Pavel Lupas	Marian Frunzeanu	Marian Munteanu
2002– 2004	Not held		
2005	Alexandru Ciocan	Ioan Sabin Andoniu	Marian Flamanzeanu
2006	Laszlo Madaras	Ioan Sabin Andoniu	Alexandru Ciocan
2007	Not held		
2008	George Adrian Manu	Gabriel Pop	Alexandru Ciocan
2009	Gabriel Pop	Carol-Eduard Novak	George Daniel Anghelache
2010	George Daniel Anghelache	Zoltán Sipos	Gabriel Pop
2011	Andrei Nechita	Emil Stefan Morcov	Lars Pria
2012	Andrei Nechita	Valentin Plesea	Zoltán Sipos
2013	Eduard-Michael Grosu	Andrei Nechita	Valentin Plesea
2014	Andrei Nechita	Zoltán Sipos	Marian Frunzeanu
2015	Serghei Țvetcov	Daniel Crista	Andrei Nechita
2016	Serghei Țvetcov	Eduard-Michael Grosu	Daniel Crista
2017	Eduard-Michael Grosu	Serghei Țvetcov	Daniel Crista
2018	Eduard-Michael Grosu	Daniel Crista	Carol-Eduard Novak
2019	Serghei Țvetcov	Daniel Crista	Emil Dima
2020	Serghei Țvetcov	Emil Dima	Eduard-Michael Grosu
2021	Serghei Țvetcov	Daniel Crista	Emil Dima
2022	Daniel Crista	Jozsef-Attila Malnasi	Cristian Raileanu
2023	Eduard-Michael Grosu	Serghei Țvetcov	Daniel Crista
2024	Emil Dima	Cristian Raileanu	Daniel Crista
2025	Emil Dima	Cristian Raileanu	Iustin-Ioan Vaidian
2026	Cristian Raileanu	Iustin-Ioan Vaidian	Catalin Buta

=== Under-23 ===
Year	Gold	Silver	Bronze
2008	Ionel Rusu	Traian Adrian Ionescu	Marius Petrache
2009	Zoltán Sipos	Ionel Rusu	Mihail Rusu
2010	Zoltán Sipos	Mihail Rusu	Lucian Voinea
2011	Bogdan Coman	Cristian Munteanu	Eduard-Michael Grosu
2012	Valentin Plesea	Zoltán Sipos	Bodgan Coman
2013	Eduard-Michael Grosu	Valentin Plesea	Zoltán Sipos
2014	Valentin Plesea	Eduard-Michael Grosu	Adrian-Dimitru Zamfir
2015	Nicola Andrei Barbu	Ionut-Adrian Sdraila	Leonard Barbu
2016	Emil Dima	Nicola Andrei Barbu	Dorin Alexandru Tescanu
2017	Jozsef-Attila Malnasi	Emil Dima	Vlad Nicolae Dobre
2018	Emil Dima	Lorant Balazsi	Jozsef-Attila Malnasi
2019	Emil Dima	Denis Marian Vulcan	Lorant Balazsi
2020	Jozsef-Attila Malnasi	Andrei Cojanu	Iustin Ioan Vaidian
2021	Serban Luncan	Adrian-Marius Florea	Andrei Cojanu
2022	Ioan Dobrin	Serban Luncan	Erick Rogoz-Lorincz
2023	Serban Luncan	Mihnea-Alexandru Harasim	Iustin-Ioan Văidian
2024	Mihnea-Alexandru Harasim	Ioan Dobrin	Eduard Kato
2025	Ovidiu Dorcu	Catalin Buta	Horea Stefan Precup
2026	Mihnea-Alexandru Harasim	Iustin-Ioan Vaidian	Catalin Buta

== Women ==
Year	Gold
2008	Eniko Nagy
2009	Eniko Nagy
2010	Beata Adrienne Piringer
2011	Beata Adrienne Piringer
2012	Beata Adrienne Piringer
2013	Beata Adrienne Piringer
2014	Beata Adrienne Piringer
2015	Ana Maria Covrig
2016	Ana Maria Covrig
2017	Ana Maria Covrig
2018	Ana Maria Covrig
2019	Ana Maria Covrig
2020	Maria-Ecaterina Stancu
2021	Manuela Mureșan
2022	Maria-Ecaterina Stancu
2023	Manuela Mureșan
2024	Manuela Mureșan
2025	Manuela Mureșan
2026	Catalina Andreea Catineanu

== See also ==
- Romanian National Road Race Championships
- National road cycling championships
