= Ana Maria Covrig =

Romanian cyclist (born 1994)

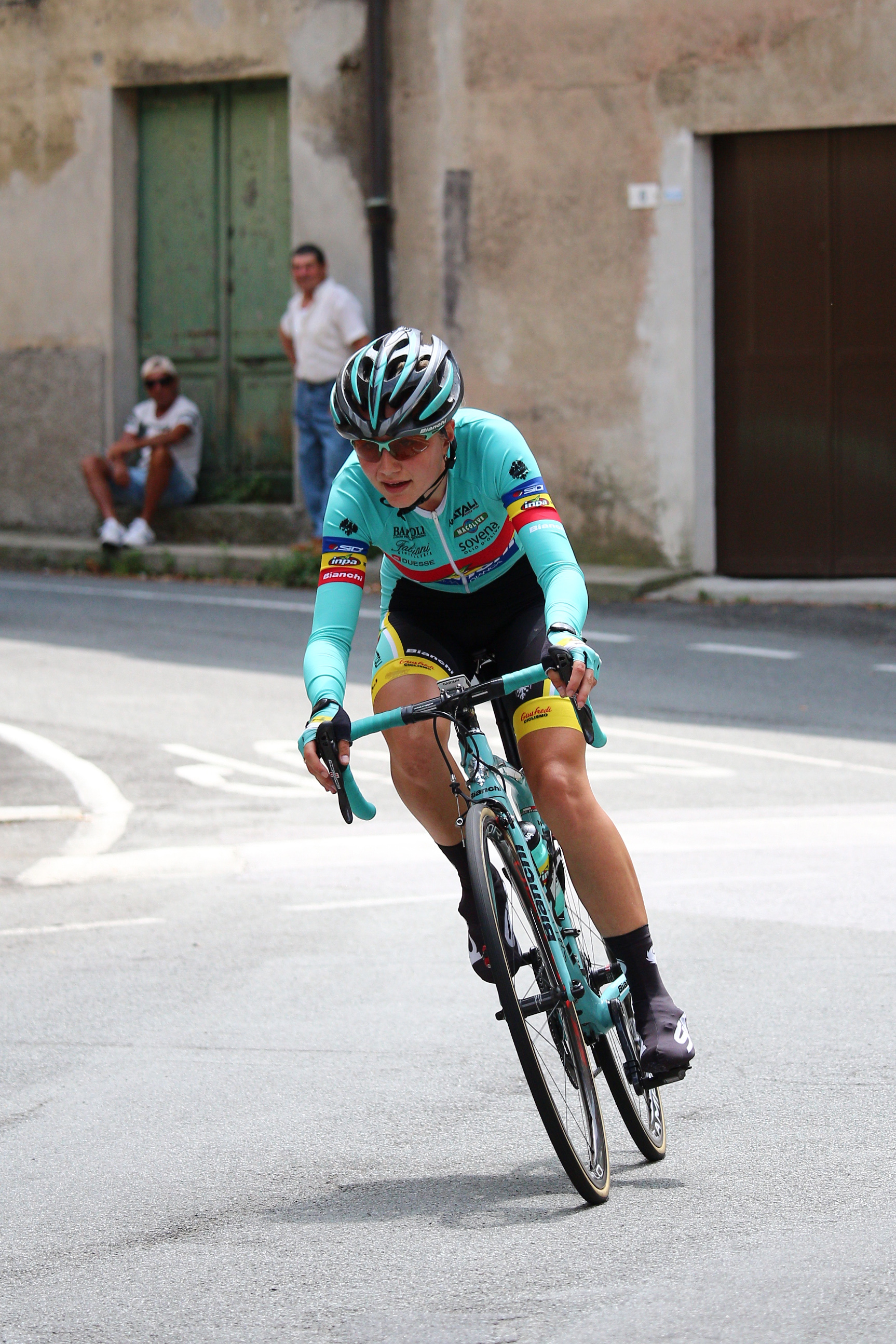
- Covrig during the 2016 Giro d'Italia Femminile

Personal information
- Full name: Ana Maria Covrig
- Born: 8 December 1994 (age 31) Cluj-Napoca, Romania
- Height: 165 cm (5 ft 5 in)
- Weight: 57 kg (126 lb)

Cycling career
- Sport: Cycling
- Current team: Retired
- Disciplines: Road; Track
- Role: Rider

Amateur team
- 2021: Gruppo Sportivo Pausa Pranzo

Professional teams
- 2014–2015: Astana BePink Women Team
- 2016: Inpa–Bianchi
- 2017: Top Girls Fassa Bortolo
- 2018–2019: Eurotarget–Bianchi–Vitasana

Major wins
- One day races & Classics National Road Race Championships (2015–2019) National Time Trial Championships (2015–2019)

Ana Maria Covrig (born 8 December 1994) is a Romanian former professional racing cyclist, who rode professionally between 2014 and 2019 for the BePink–La Classica, Inpa–Bianchi, Top Girls Fassa Bortolo and Eurotarget–Bianchi–Vittoria teams.

She won ten national road titles during her career, winning both the Romanian National Road Race Championships and Romanian National Time Trial Championships five times consecutively between 2015 and 2019.

== See also ==
- List of 2015 UCI Women's Teams and riders
