= Serghei Țvetcov =

Romanian cyclist (born 1988)

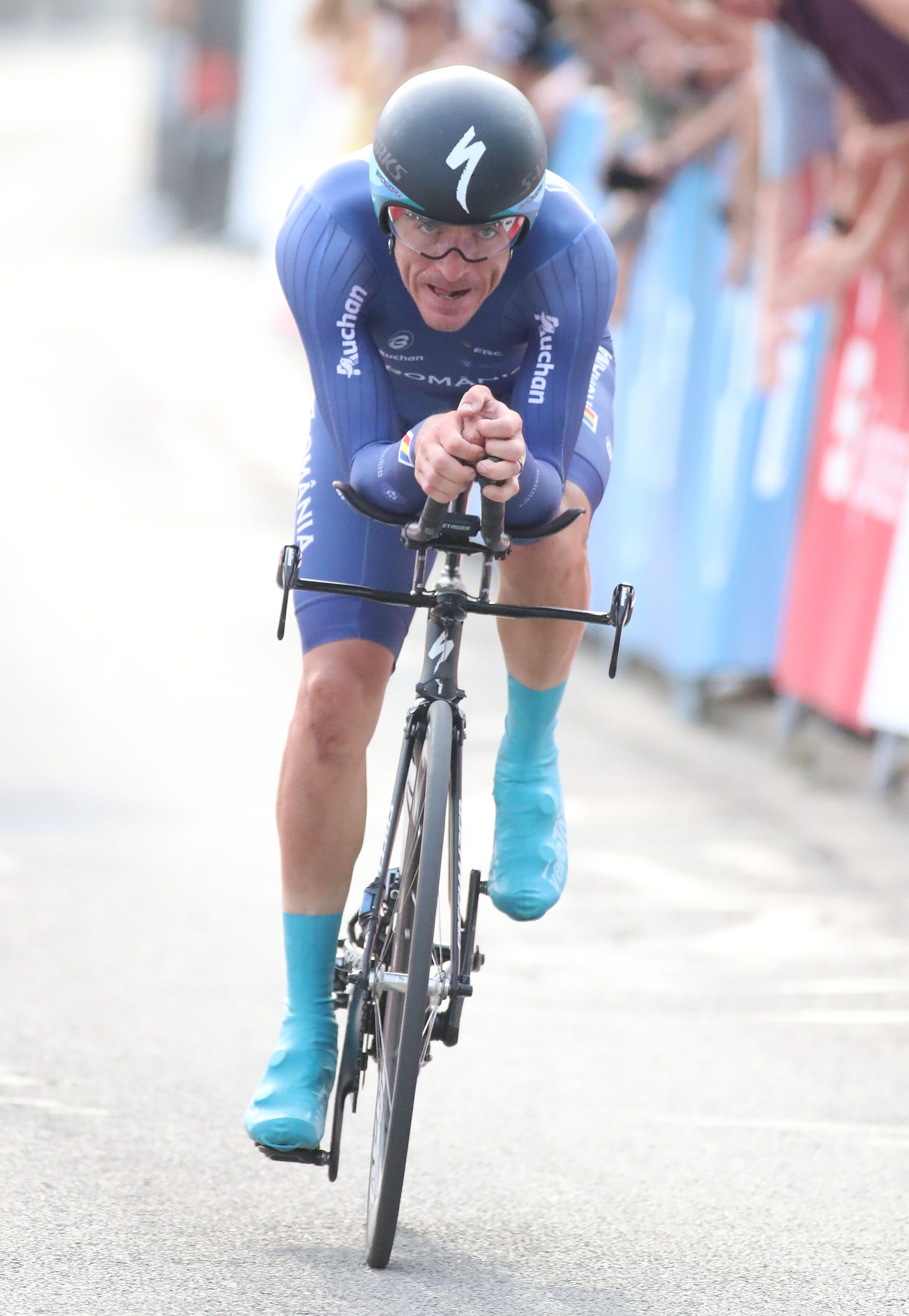
- Țvetcov in 2022

Personal information
- Full name: Serghei Țvetcov
- Born: 29 December 1988 (age 37): Kishinev, Moldavian SSR, Soviet Union (now Moldova)
- Height: 1.80 m (5 ft 11 in)
- Weight: 74 kg (163 lb)

Cycling career
- Sport: Cycling
- Current team: FNIX–SCOM–Hengxiang Cycling Team
- Discipline: Road
- Role: Rider

Professional teams
- 2013–2014: Jelly Belly–Kenda
- 2015–2016: Androni Giocattoli
- 2017: Jelly Belly–Maxxis
- 2018: UnitedHealthcare
- 2019: Floyd's Pro Cycling
- 2020: Team Sapura Cycling
- 2021–2022: Wildlife Generation Pro Cycling
- 2023: Denver Disruptors
- 2023–: Hengxiang Cycling Team

Major wins
- One-day races and Classics Moldovan National Time Trial Championships (2007, 2009) Romanian National Road Race Championships (2015, 2021, 2023) Romanian National Time Trial Championships (2015–2016, 2019–2021)

Serghei Țvetcov (born 29 December 1988) is a Moldovan-born Romanian racing cyclist, who rides for the Denver Disruptors. He rode at the 2014 UCI Road World Championships, where he competed in both the road race and the individual time trial.

In the 2013 and 2014 seasons, he rode for the UCI Continental team Jelly Belly–Maxxis. His best result in this time was third place in the 2014 USA Pro Cycling Challenge. Following this result, he signed for the UCI Professional Continental team Androni Giocattoli for the 2015 season.

In December 2022, Țvetcov was announced as part of the Denver Disruptors team for the inaugural season of the National Cycling League, in 2023.

== Major results ==
2007
1st Time trial, Moldovan National Road Championships
2008
3rd Time trial, Moldovan National Road Championships
2009
1st Time trial, Moldovan National Road Championships
4th Overall Tour of Romania
2010
Moldovan National Road Championships

2nd Time trial
3rd Road race

2011
10th Tobago Cycling Classic
2014
1st Stage 3 (ITT) Tour of the Gila
3rd Overall USA Pro Cycling Challenge
3rd Overall Tour de Beauce
6th Overall Tour of Alberta
10th Overall Grand Prix Cycliste de Saguenay
2015
Romanian National Road Championships

1st Time trial
1st Road race

3rd Overall Sibiu Cycling Tour

1st Romanian rider classification

3rd Overall Tour of Szeklerland

1st Stage 3a (ITT)

2016
Romanian National Road Championships

1st Time trial
3rd Road race

5th Overall Tour of Bihor
2017
2nd Overall Colorado Classic

1st Mountains classification
1st Stage 3

2nd Overall Tour of the Gila
3rd Overall Tour of Utah
5th Overall Cascade Cycling Classic
7th Overall Tour of Taihu Lake
10th Overall Grand Prix Cycliste de Saguenay
2018
1st Overall Tour de Korea

1st Stage 3

1st Overall Tour of Romania

1st Stage 2

1st Chrono Kristin Armstrong
2nd Overall Colorado Classic
3rd Overall Tour de Beauce

1st Points classification
1st Stage 3a (ITT)

4th Overall Tour of the Gila

1st Stage 3 (ITT)

4th Overall Tour of Taihu Lake
2019
1st Time trial, Romanian National Road Championships
1st Chrono Kristin Armstrong
1st Stage 3 (ITT) Tour of the Gila
4th Overall Tour of Romania

1st Mountains classification
1st Romanian rider classification

5th Overall Tour de Beauce

1st Stage 3a (ITT)

5th Overall Sibiu Cycling Tour
9th Time trial, European Games
2020
Romanian National Road Championships

1st Time trial
2nd Road race

2nd Overall Tour of Szeklerland

1st Stage 3a (ITT)

5th Overall Tour of Romania
2021
Romanian National Road Championships

1st Time trial
1st Road race

2nd Overall Tour of Romania
2022
3rd Road race, Romanian National Road Championships
2023
Romanian National Road Championships

1st Road race
2nd Time trial

=== Grand Tour general classification results timeline ===
Grand Tour	2015
Giro d'Italia	139
Tour de France	—
Vuelta a España	—

Legend
—	Did not compete
DNF	Did not finish
