= Team United Shipping =

Hungarian cycling team

- Team United Shipping at the 2026 Tour of Romania

Team information
- UCI code: TUS
- Registered: Hungary (2024–)
- Founded: 2024
- Status: Amateur (2024); UCI Continental (2025–)
- Website: Team home page

Key personnel
- General manager: Zoltán Kummer
- Team manager: Dejan Percic

Team name history
- 2024–: Team United Shipping

Team United Shipping is a UCI Continental road bicycle racing team based in Hungary. It was formed in 2024 as an amateur team before being promoted to UCI Continental level in 2025. For the 2025 season, the team signed two-time Giro d'Italia participant Erik Fetter in addition to Bálint Feldhoffer and János Pelikán.

As of 2025, the team is in a strategic partnership with Bahrain Victorious.

== Team roster ==
As of 1 January 2025

Rider	Date of birth
Catalin-Luca Campean (ROM)	28 March 2006 (age 20)
Szabolcs Csáki (HUN)	13 December 2006 (age 19)
Máté Endrédi (HUN)	22 September 2005 (age 21)
Bálint Feldhoffer (HUN)	26 December 2005 (age 20)
Erik Fetter (HUN)	5 April 2000 (age 26)
Barnabás Mórocz (HUN)	6 October 2004 (age 22)

Rider	Date of birth
Zsombor Palumby (HUN)	6 June 1996 (age 30)
János Pelikán (HUN)	19 April 1995 (age 31)
Michal Schuran (CZE)	30 June 1996 (age 30)
Veljko Stojnić (SRB)	4 February 1999 (age 27)
Mihajlo Stolić (SRB)	15 February 2004 (age 22)
Zéteny Szijártó (HUN)	17 April 2003 (age 23)

== Major results ==
2025
Serbia National Road Race Championships, Veljko Stojnić
Hungary National Time Trial Championships, János Pelikán
2026
1st International Rhodes Grand Prix, Nikiforos Arvanitou
Mountains classification Tour de Hongrie, Erik Fetter
Greece National Road Race Championships, Nikiforos Arvanitou
Serbia National Road Race Championships, Veljko Stojnić
Mountains classification Tour of Britain, Michal Schuran
Stage 4 Okolo Slovenska (Tour de Slovaquie), Erik Fetter
