= Sam–Vitalcare–Dynatek =

Italian cycling team

- Team at the 2026 Tour of Romania

Team information
- UCI code: IWD (2020, 2023–2024); IWM (2021–2022); IPD (2025–)
- Registered: Italy
- Founded: 2005
- Discipline: Road
- Status: UCI Continental (2020–)

Key personnel
- General manager: Demetrio Iommi
- Team managers: Emilio Mistichelli; Biagio Conte; Mirco Lorenzetto

Team name history
- 2005–2011; 2012; 2013–2017; 2018–2019; 2020; 2021; 2022; 2023–2024; 2025–2026; 2026-: US Fausto Coppi Gazzera–Videa; US Fausto Coppi Gazzera–Generali–Videa; US Fausto Coppi Gazzera–Videa; Work Service–Videa–Coppi Gazzera; Work Service–Dinatek–Vega; Work Service–Marchiol–Dynatek; Work Service–Vitalcare–Vega; Work Service–Vitalcare–Dynatek; Sam–Vitalcare–Dynatek; Vega–Vitalcare–Dynatek

Sam–Vitalcare–Dynatek (UCI code: IPD) is an Italian cycling team founded in 2005, that became a UCI Continental team in 2020.

== Team roster ==
As of 5 March 2021.

Rider	Date of birth
Matteo Barsottelli (ITA)	8 December 2000 (age 25)
Riccardo Bobbo (ITA)	10 May 1999 (age 27)
Giovanni Bortoluzzi (ITA)	3 November 2002 (age 23)
Federico Burchio (ITA)	21 March 1996 (age 30)
Marco Cao (ITA)	23 May 2002 (age 24)
Raul Colombo (ITA)	19 August 1996 (age 30)
Stefano Di Benedetto (ITA)	16 March 1998 (age 28)
Filippo Dignani (ITA)	25 January 2002 (age 24)

Rider	Date of birth
Giacomo Garavaglia (ITA)	3 July 1996 (age 30)
Moreno Marchetti (ITA)	27 April 1998 (age 28)
Patrick Mentil (ITA)	18 January 2001 (age 25)
Christian Pase (ITA)	26 February 2002 (age 24)
Eric Paties Montagner (ITA)	27 August 2002 (age 24)
Davide Rebellin (ITA)	9 August 1971 (age 55)
Francesco Zandri (ITA)	20 July 1997 (age 29)
Michael Zecchin (ITA)	19 July 2001 (age 25)
