= Emil Dima =

Romanian cyclist

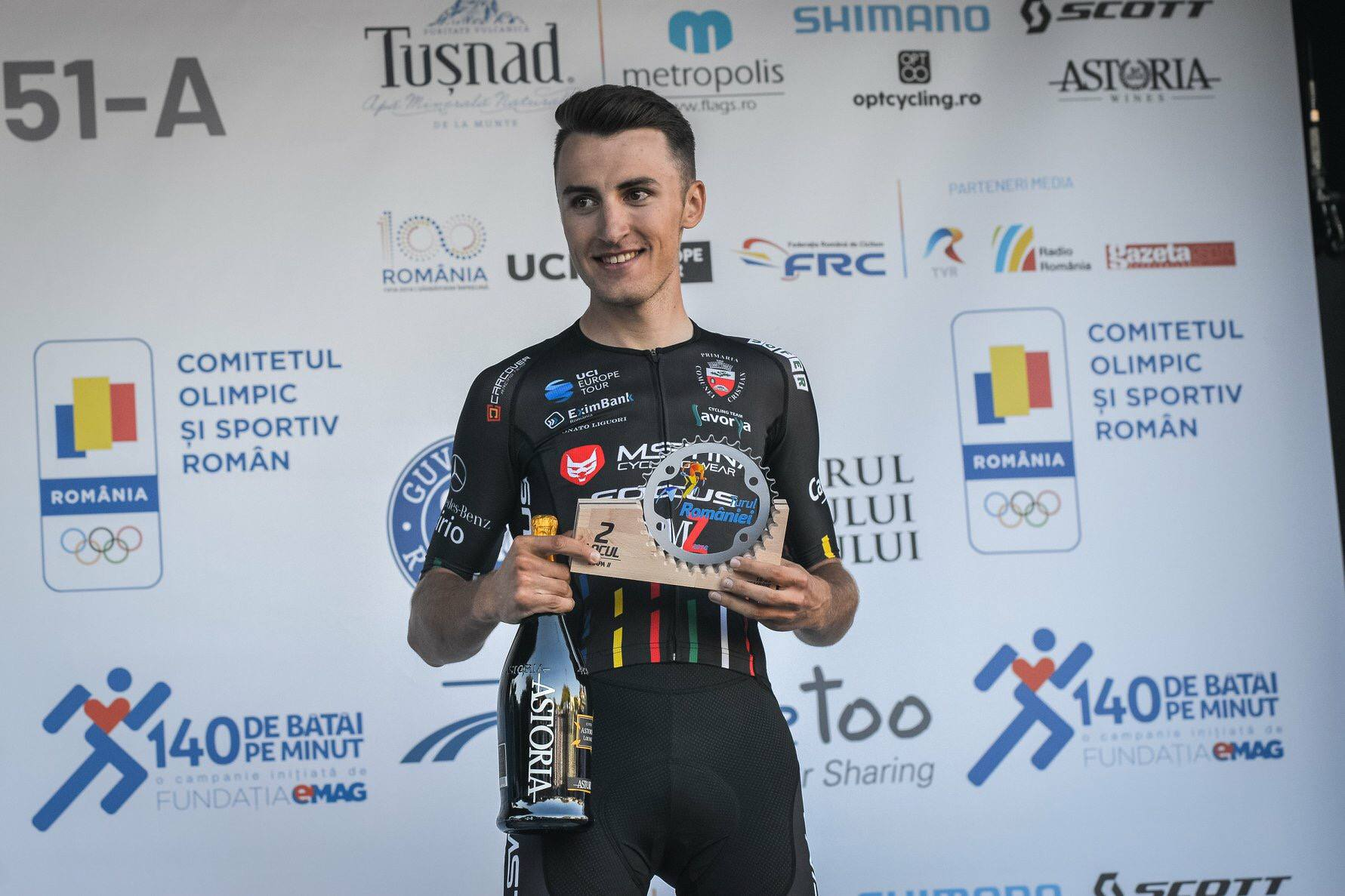
- Dima in 2018

Personal information
- Full name: Emil Dima
- Born: 22 February 1997 (age 29) Cristian, Brașov County, Romania
- Height: 1.80 m (5 ft 11 in)
- Weight: 69 kg (152 lb)

Cycling career
- Sport: Cycling
- Current team: Monzon–Incolor–Gub
- Discipline: Road
- Role: Rider
- Rider type: All-rounder

Amateur team
- 2017: Abmol

Professional teams
- 2016: Tuşnad Cycling Team
- 2018–: MsTina–Focus

Major wins
- One-day races and Classics National Road Race Championships (2022) National Time Trial Championships (2024)

Emil Dima (born 22 February 1997) is a Romanian racing cyclist, who currently rides for UCI Continental team Monzon–Incolor–Gub.

== Major results ==
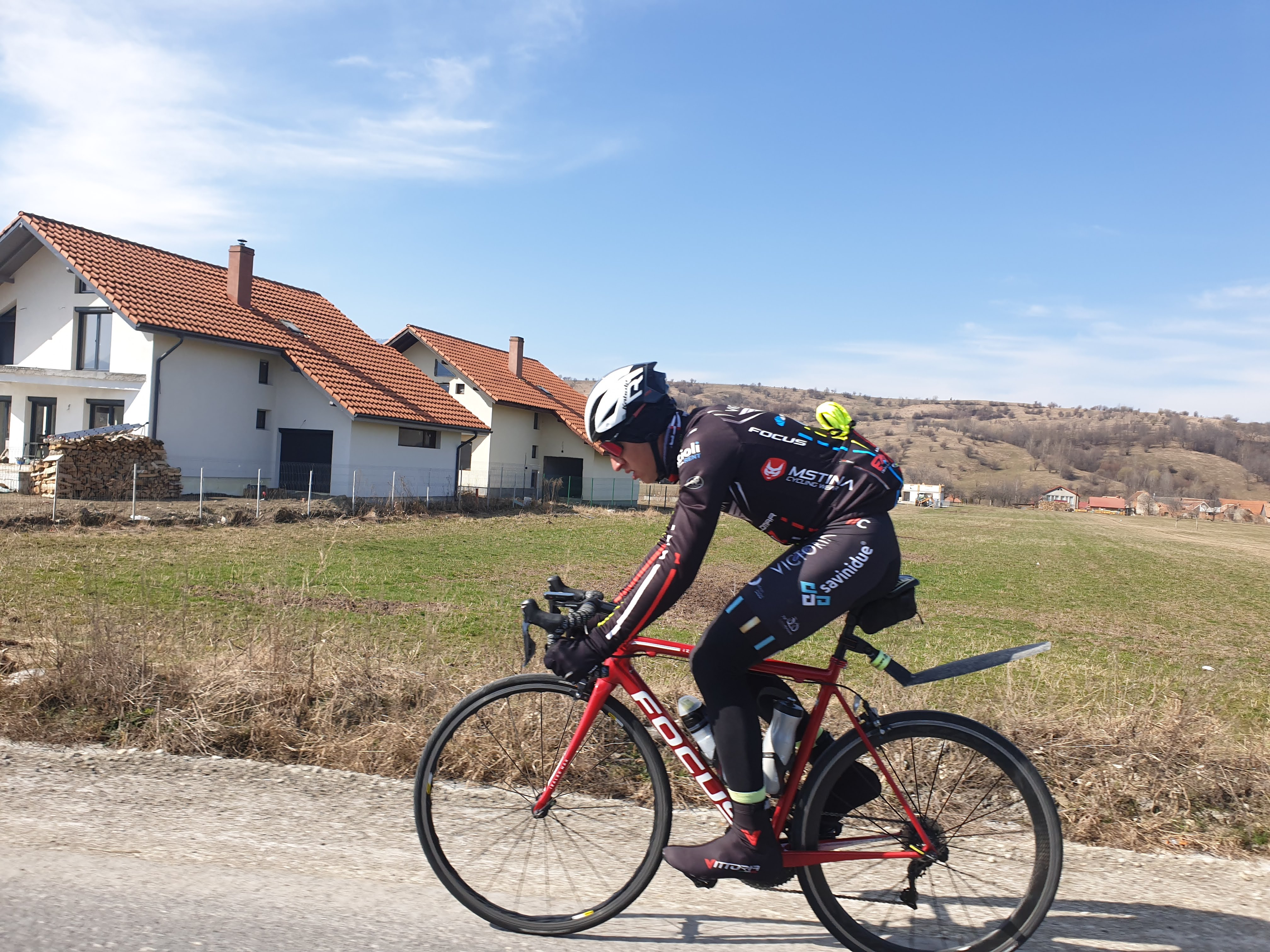
Emil training in Brașov County in 2021.

2014
National Junior Road Championships

2nd Time trial
2nd Road race

7th Memorial Dimitar Yankov
2015
National Junior Road Championships

1st Time trial
1st Road race

2016
1st Time trial, National Under-23 Road Championships
2017
National Under-23 Road Championships

1st Road race
2nd Time trial

3rd Road race, National Road Championships
2018
National Under-23 Road Championships

1st Time trial
1st Road race

6th Overall Tour of Romania
8th Overall Tour of Bihor
2019
1st Time trial, National Under-23 Road Championships
9th Overall Tour of Szeklerland
8th Overall Tour of Romania
2020
National Road Championships

2nd Time trial
4th Road race

4th Overall Tour of Szeklerland
7th Overall Tour of Romania
2021
8th Overall Tour of Romania

1st Stage 4

2022
National Road Championships

1st Road race

2nd Overall Tour of Szeklerland
2024
National Road Championships

1st Time trial
2nd Road race

2025
National Road Championships

1st Time trial
