= Eduard-Michael Grosu =

Romanian cyclist (born 1992)

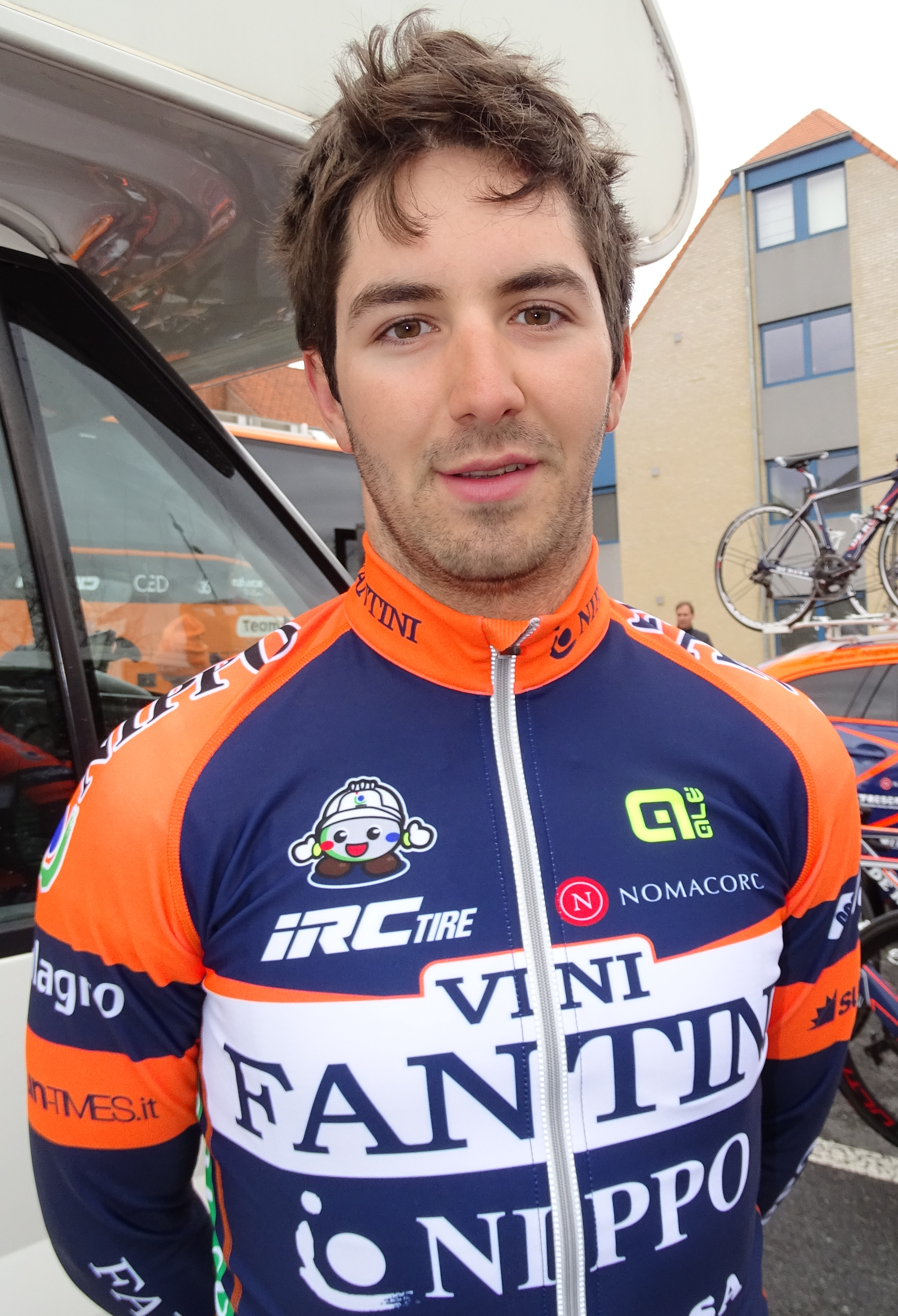
- Grosu in 2015

Personal information
- Full name: Eduard-Michael Grosu
- Born: 4 September 1992 (age 34) Zărnești, Romania
- Height: 1.73 m (5 ft 8 in)
- Weight: 68 kg (150 lb)

Cycling career
- Sport: Cycling
- Discipline: Road
- Role: Rider
- Rider type: Sprinter

Amateur teams
- 2011: Cerone–Rodman–Carrozzeria Leone
- 2012: Progettociclismo Evo Team
- 2013: Overall Cycling Team

Professional teams
- 2014–2018: Vini Fantini–Nippo
- 2019–2021: Delko–Marseille Provence
- 2022: Drone Hopper–Androni Giocattoli
- 2023: HRE Mazowsze Serce Polski

Eduard-Michael Grosu (born 4 September 1992) is a Romanian professional racing cyclist, who last rode for UCI Continental team HRE Mazowsze Serce Polski. He is the first Romanian to ride professionally.

== Major results ==
2008
2nd Time trial, National Junior Road Championships
Balkan Cadet Road Championships

3rd Road race
3rd Time trial

2009
2nd Time trial, National Junior Road Championships
2010
1st Time trial, National Junior Road Championships
2011
1st National Cyclo-cross Championships
3rd Road race, National Under-23 Road Championships
2012
3rd Overall Tour of Trakya
9th Grand Prix Dobrich II
2013
1st Time trial, National Road Championships
1st Time trial, National Under-23 Road Championships
1st Stage 3 Tour of Romania
2014
National Under-23 Road Championships

1st Road race
2nd Time trial

1st Overall Tour of Estonia

1st Points classification
1st Young rider classification
1st Stage 1

1st Stage 12 Tour of Qinghai Lake
2nd Overall Carpathian Couriers Race

1st Points classification
1st Stages 5 & 6

2nd Ronde van Midden-Nederland
3rd Road race, National Road Championships
7th GP Izola
10th Overall Szlakiem Grodów Piastowskich
2015
4th Gran Piemonte
6th Grand Prix de Fourmies
8th Brussels Cycling Classic
9th Coppa Bernocchi
2016
1st National Cyclo-cross Championships
2nd Time trial, National Road Championships
9th Overall Tour of Taihu Lake

1st Stage 5

9th Nokere Koerse
2017
1st Time trial, National Road Championships
1st National Cyclo-cross Championships
Sibiu Cycling Tour

1st Romanian rider classification
1st Stage 4

9th Gran Premio della Costa Etruschi
2018
National Road Championships

1st Road race
1st Time trial

1st National Cyclo-cross Championships
Tour of Qinghai Lake

1st Stages 3, 7 & 8

Tour of Croatia

1st Points classification
1st Stage 2

10th Three Days of Bruges–De Panne
2019
1st Ronde van Limburg
Tour of Qinghai Lake

1st Points classification
1st Stages 3 & 6

1st Stage 2 Okolo Slovenska
1st Stage 2 CRO Race
3rd Time trial, National Road Championships
5th Route Adélie
2020
1st Overall Tour of Romania

1st Stages 3 & 4

National Road Championships

3rd Road race
3rd Time trial

5th Paris–Camembert
8th Overall Tour of Szeklerland
2021
2nd Road race, National Road Championships
5th Bredene Koksijde Classic
2022
Tour of Romania

1st Points classification
1st Stage 3

4th Time trial, National Road Championships
2023
1st Time trial, National Road Championships
2nd Overall Belgrade–Banja Luka
2nd Puchar MON
2nd Grand Prix Poland, Visegrad 4 Bicycle Race
6th Overall Dookoła Mazowsza
9th Road race, Balkan Road Championships

=== Grand Tour general classification results timeline ===
Grand Tour	2015	2016
Giro d'Italia	150	153
Tour de France	—	—
Vuelta a España	—	—

Legend
—	Did not compete
DNF	Did not finish
