= Gerhard-Cristin Moldansky =

Romanian bicycle racer

- Moldansky in 2025

Personal information
- Born: 24 December 1999 (age 26) Romania

Cycling career
- Sport: Cycling
- Current team: MENtoRISE Teem CCN
- Disciplines: Road, Mountain bike, Cyclo-cross, Gravel
- Role: Rider

Amateur teams
- 2019: Dinamo–BikeXpert–Superbet
- 2020: Dinamo Bike Expert
- 2021: CS Dinamo București
- 2022: Dinamo–BikeXpert–Superbet

Professional teams
- 2022: MENtoRISE Elite Team CFX (stagiaire)
- 2023–: MENtoRISE Elite Team CFX

Major wins
- One-day races and Classics National Road Race Championships (2025)

Gerhard-Cristin Moldansky (born 24 December 1999) is a Romanian cyclist, who currently rides for UCI Continental team MENtoRISE Teem CCN.

== Major results ==
=== Gravel ===
2026
2nd National Championships

=== Road ===
2023
9th Cupa Max Ausnit
2024
4th Cupa Max Ausnit
2025 (1 pro win)
1st Road race, National Road Championships
2026
4thRoad race, Balkan Road Championships
