= Estonian Cyclists' Union =

National governing body of cycle racing in Estonia

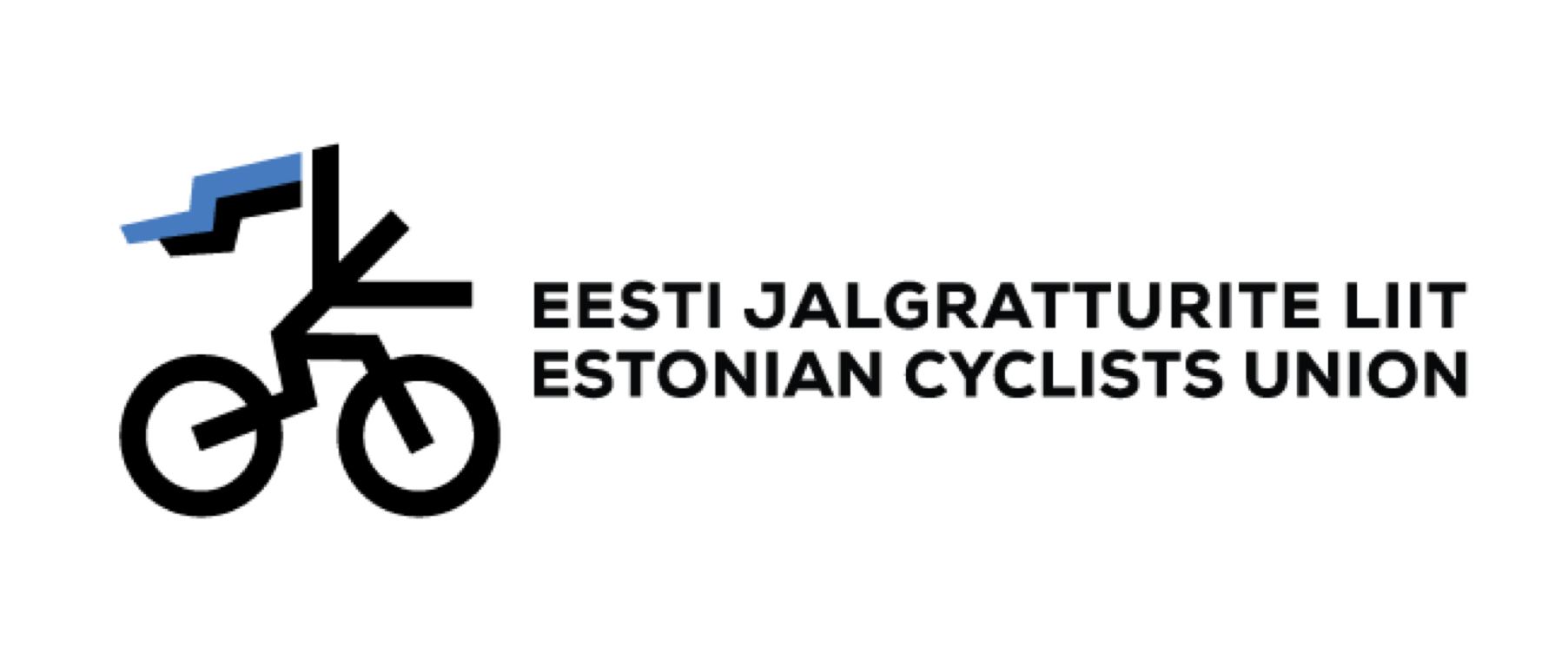
EJL logo

Former logo

Estonian Cyclists' Union (Estonian: Eesti Jalgratturite Liit, abbreviation EJL) is the national governing body of cycle racing in Estonia.

The EJL is a member of the UCI and the UEC.
