= Daniel Crista =

Romanian cyclist

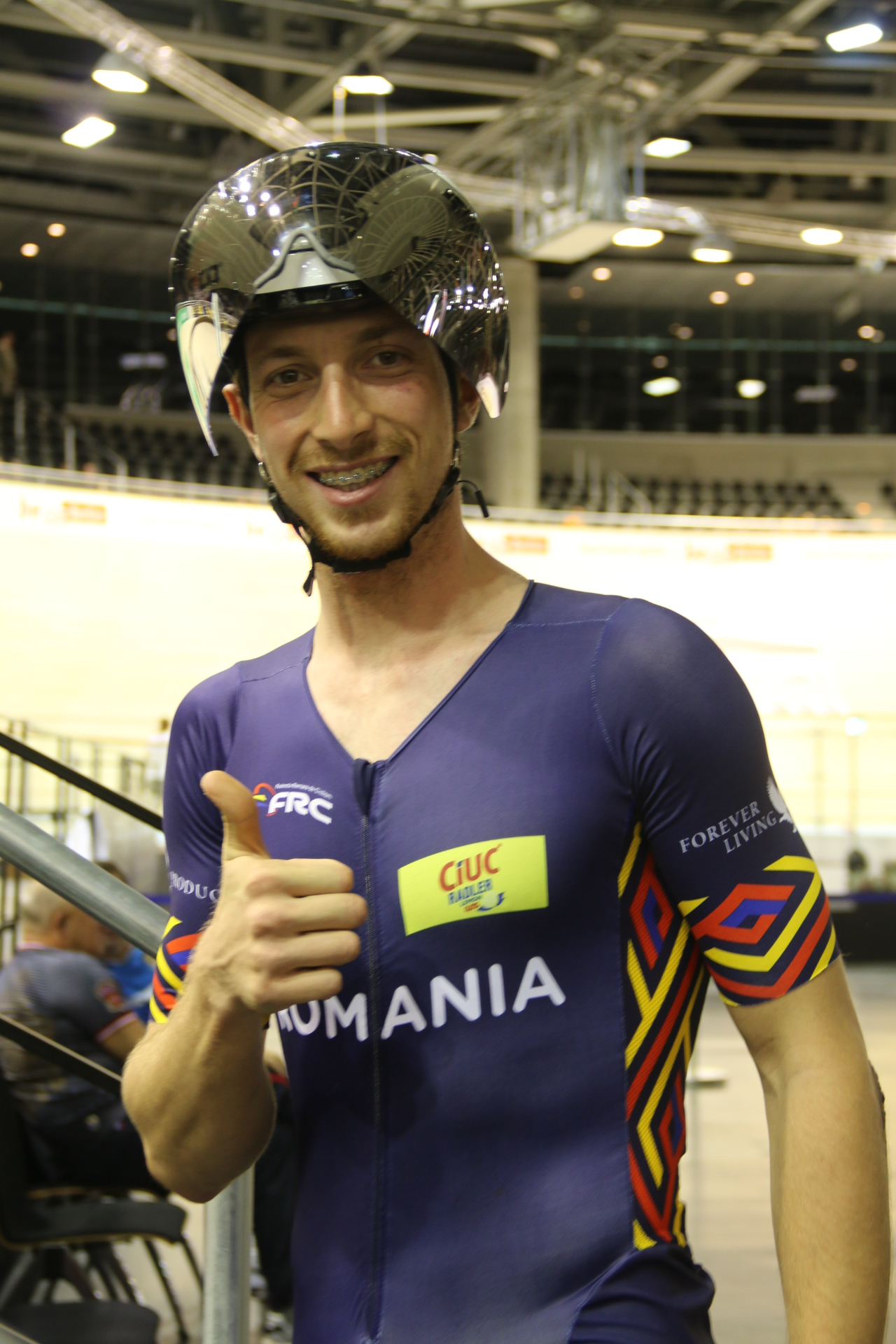
- Crista at the 2017 UEC European Track Championships

Personal information
- Full name: Daniel Crista
- Born: 19 January 1991 (age 35) Reșița, Romania

Cycling career
- Sport: Cycling
- Current team: CSA Steaua București
- Disciplines: Road; Track
- Role: Rider

Amateur teams
- 2015: Romania National Team
- 2017–2018: CSA Steaua București
- 2020–: CSA Steaua București

Professional teams
- 2016: Tuşnad Cycling Team
- 2017: Copenhagen Pro Cycling
- 2019: Giotti Victoria–Palomar

Major wins
- One-day races and Classics National Road Race Championships (2020)
Medal record
Men's track cycling
Representing Romania
European Championships
Bronze medal – third place	2020 Plovdiv	Points race

Daniel Crista (born 19 January 1991) is a Romanian racing cyclist, who rides for Romanian amateur team CSA Steaua București.

== Major results ==
=== Road ===
2013
6th Road race, National Road Championships
6th Time trial, National Under-23 Road Championships
2014
5th Road race, National Road Championships
2015
National Road Championships

2nd Time trial
5th Road race

2016
National Road Championships

2nd Road race
3rd Time trial

7th Overall Tour de Hongrie
7th Overall Tour of Szeklerland
2017
1st Mountains classification, Tour de Serbie
National Road Championships

2nd Time trial
6th Road race

7th Overall Tour of Szeklerland
2018
National Road Championships

2nd Time trial
2nd Road race

5th Overall Tour of Szeklerland

1st Prologue

7th Overall Tour of Fatih Sultan Mehmet
2019
1st Prologue Tour of Szeklerland
2nd Time trial, National Road Championships
9th Grand Prix Justiniano Hotels
2020
National Road Championships

1st Road race
4th Time trial

2021
National Road Championships

2nd Time trial
3rd Road race

2022
1st Time trial, National Road Championships
2023
National Road Championships

3rd Time trial
3rd Road race

2024
National Road Championships

3rd Time trial
7th Road race

=== Track ===
2018
National Track Championships

1st Individual pursuit
1st Points race
3rd Team sprint

2019
National Track Championships

1st Individual pursuit
1st Team pursuit
3rd Omnium

2020
National Track Championships

1st Individual pursuit
1st Omnium
1st Points race
1st Scratch
1st Team pursuit
2nd Kilo
2nd Team sprint

3rd Points race, UEC European Track Championships
2022
National Track Championships

1st Elimination race
1st Individual pursuit
1st Kilo
1st Omnium
1st Points race
1st Scratch
1st Sprint
1st Team pursuit
1st Team sprint
1st Tempo race
