= Gabriel Pop =

Romania international rugby union player

- Full name: Gabriel Gheorghe Pop
- Born: 29 March 1998 (age 28) Romania
- Height: 192 cm (6 ft 4 in)
- Weight: 92 kg (203 lb; 14 st 7 lb)

Rugby union career
- Position(s): Fly-half, Centre
- Current team: CS Dinamo București
Youth career
- 2006-2015: ER Galiza
Senior career
Years	Team	Apps	(Points)
2015-2021	ER Galiza	??	(??)
2021-2022	GDS Cascais	??	(??)
2022-	CS Dinamo București	8	(30)
2022-	Romanian Wolves	3	(0)
- Correct as of 26 November 2023
International career
Years	Team	Apps	(Points)
2017	Portugal under-20	??	(??)
2022-	Romania	6	(5)
2023	Romania A	1	(0)
- Correct as of 26 November 2023
National sevens team
Years	Team		Comps
2016	Portugal		1
- Correct as of 18 August 2023

Gabriel Gheorghe Pop (born 29 March 1998) is a Romanian rugby union who plays at CS Dinamo București in the Liga Națională de Rugby.

== Club career ==
Pop began his career at ER Galiza, starting at the age of eight. He joined Portuguese side GDS Cascais on 2021, where he spent a season before moving back to Romania to play for CS Dinamo București.

== International career ==
In 2016 he was selected for the Portugal Sevens team in the Rugby Europe 7s Grand Prix Series Lodz. He was then later selected for the Portugal under-20 squad for the 2018 World Rugby Under 20 Trophy. Where they finished third.

In 2022 Pop made his debut for Romania against Uruguay. He was named in the squad for the 2023 Rugby World Cup.
