= Giotti Victoria–Savini Due =

Romanian cycling team

Team information
- UCI code: GTS
- Registered: Romania (2018–)
- Founded: 2018
- Discipline: Road
- Status: UCI Continental

Key personnel
- General manager: Stefano Giuliani
- Team managers: Gabriele Di Francesco; Stefanino Cecini; Emil Dima

Team name history
- 2018 2019 2020 2021–: MsTina–Focus (MST); Giotti Victoria–Palomar (GTV); Giotti Victoria (GTV); Giotti Victoria–Savini Due (GTS)

Giotti Victoria–Savini Due is a Romanian UCI Continental cycling team established in 2018. The main sponsor is Italian Giotti Victoria automotive.

== Team roster ==
As of 13 February 2021.

Rider	Date of birth
Adriano Brogi (ITA)	20 July 1991 (age 35)
Andrei Dima (ROU)	22 February 2000 (age 26)
Emil Dima (ROU)	22 February 1997 (age 29)
Viktor Filutás (HUN)	28 September 1996 (age 29)
Andrea Guardini (ITA)	12 June 1989 (age 37)
Ciprian Jitaru (ROU)	15 September 2000 (age 25)

Rider	Date of birth
Andrei Mindru (ROU)	27 February 2000 (age 26)
Emanuele Onesti (ITA)	21 June 1995 (age 31)
Paolo Simion (ITA)	10 October 1992 (age 33)
Raul-Antonio Sinza (ROU)	1 February 1999 (age 27)
Kristian Yustre (COL)	26 November 1993 (age 32)

== Major results ==
2018
Stage 2 Tour of Albania, Nicolas Marini
Stage 3 Tour of Bihor, Riccardo Stacchiotti
Stage 4 Grande Prémio de Portugal N2, Riccardo Stacchiotti
Stages 1 & 5 Volta a Portugal, Riccardo Stacchiotti
2019
Stage 1 Giro di Sicilia, Riccardo Stacchiotti
Points classification Tour of Japan, Federico Zurlo

Stage 5, Federico Zurlo

Stage 3 Tour de Kumano, Federico Zurlo
Stage 4 Sibiu Cycling Tour, Riccardo Stacchiotti
Prologue Cycling Tour of Szeklerland, Daniel Crista
2021
Stages 1 & 3 Tour of Szeklerland, Andrea Guardini
Stage 4 Tour of Romania, Emil Dima

== National Champions ==
2018
Romania U23 Road Race, Emil Dima
2019
Romania U23 Time Trial, Emil Dima
Romania Road Race, Denis Marian Vulcan
2020
Hungary Road Race, Viktor Filutás
2021
Hungary Road Race, Viktor Filutás
