= Romanian Cycling Federation =

National governing body of cycle racing in Romania

- Federația Română de Ciclism
- Abbreviation: FRC
- Formation: April 26, 1931
- Headquarters: Bucharest, Romania
- Location: 16 Vasile Conta Street, Sector 2, Bucharest
- Official language: Romanian
- President: Alexandru-Cătălin Sprinceană
- Vice President: Szabolcs Sebestyén
- Vice President: Ovidiu Simen
- Affiliations: Romanian Olympic and Sports Committee (COSR), Union Cycliste Internationale (UCI), European Cycling Union (UEC)
- Website: federatiadeciclism.ro

The Romanian Cycling Federation (Romanian: Federația Română de Ciclism), abbreviated to FRC, is the national governing body of cycle racing in Romania.

The FRC is a member of the UCI and the UEC.

== History ==
In the late 19th century, Romania witnessed a surge in interest in cycling, leading to the emergence of cycling clubs, races, and velodromes. Clubs like "Velocitas" and "Huniade" were established as early as 1886, followed by the founding of the "Cycling Association" in 1889. A notable milestone in Romanian cycling history occurred in 1891 when the first official race in Bucharest covered a 10-kilometer route from Otopeni to Băneasa, with D. Dumitrescu emerging as the winner.

As the popularity of cycling grew, the need for organized coordination became evident. The "Velocipedists Club" was established in Bucharest in 1891, marking a significant step in the formalization of cycling activities. The year 1893 witnessed cycling races conducted for charitable purposes, further cementing the status of cycling as a recognized sport in Romania. Subsequently, the "Cyclists Club" was founded in 1896, followed by the "Union of Romanian Velocipedists" in 1897, both aiming to assume the role of a national cycling federation. The turn of the century saw the birth of the "Union of Excursionist Cyclists" in 1900, accompanied by the introduction of the country's first monthly cycling magazine, "Bicicleta".

These developments culminated in the establishment of the Romanian Cycling Federation on April 26, 1931. This marked a pivotal moment in the history of Romanian cycling, formalizing its status as a sport with a national governing body. The federation's foundation was built upon the legacy of the "Union of Romanian Velocipedists" (1897) and the "Cycling Commission" (1912), both integral in shaping the organized cycling landscape within Romania.

== Races ==
Starting in 1934, the Romanian Cycling Federation took the helm in organizing the Tour of Romania. This event showcased the nation's top road cyclists as they competed in a multi-stage race across the country.

The federation also played a pivotal role in hosting the National Road Championships, providing a platform for domestic riders to vie for national titles in various road cycling disciplines. Additionally, the federation contributed to the staging of editions of the Peace Race. Romania became the sixth country in the world to organize a National Amateur Cycling Tour, after Belgium (1906), Netherlands (1909), Bulgaria (1924), Hungary (1925) and Poland (1928).

== See also ==
- Tour of Romania
- Romanian National Road Race Championships
- Romanian National Time Trial Championships
