= 2022 BWF season =

Badminton competition

Details
- Duration: 13 January – 18 December
- Edition: 16th
- Tournaments: 111
- Categories: Grade 1 – (Individuals, Teams): 2; Grade 2 – BWF World Tour Finals: 1; Grade 2 – Super 1000: 2; Grade 2 – Super 750: 4; Grade 2 – Super 500: 6; Grade 2 – Super 300: 7; Grade 2 – Super 100: 5; Grade 3 – International Challenge: 27; Grade 3 – International Series: 24; Grade 3 – Future Series: 18; Continental Championships: 8; Multisport event: 7

Achievements (singles)

Awards
- Player of the year: (Denmark) Viktor Axelsen (male) (Japan) Akane Yamaguchi (female) (China) Zheng Siwei (pair) (China) Huang Yaqiong (pair)

The 2022 BWF season was the overall badminton circuit organized by the Badminton World Federation (BWF) for the 2022 badminton season to publish and promote the sport. The world badminton tournament in 2022 consisted of:

- BWF Major Events Tournaments (Grade 1)
  - BWF World Men's and Women's Team Championships (Thomas & Uber Cup)
  - BWF World Championships
- BWF World Tour (Grade 2)
  - BWF World Tour Finals (Level 1)
  - BWF World Tour Super 1000 (Level 2)
  - BWF World Tour Super 750 (Level 3)
  - BWF World Tour Super 500 (Level 4)
  - BWF World Tour Super 300 (Level 5)
  - BWF Tour Super 100 (Level 6)
- BWF Continental Circuit (Grade 3)
  - BWF International Challenge (Level 1)
  - BWF International Series (Level 2)
  - BWF Future Series (Level 3)

The Thomas & Uber Cup were team events. The others – Super 1000, Super 750, Super 500, Super 300, Super 100, International Challenge, International Series, and Future Series were all individual tournaments. The higher the level of tournament, the larger the prize money and the more ranking points available.

The 2022 BWF season calendar comprised these six levels of BWF tournaments.

== Schedule ==
This is the complete schedule of events on the 2022 calendar, with the champions and runners-up documented.

Key

World Championships
World Tour Finals
Super 1000
Super 750
Super 500
Super 300
Super 100
International Challenge
International Series
Future Series
Continental events/Team Events

=== January ===
Week commencing	Tournament	Champions	Runners-up
10 January	India Open (Draw): Host: New Delhi, India; Venue: K. D. Jadhav Indoor Stadium; Level: Super 500; Prize: $400,000; Format: 32MS/32WS/32MD/32WD/32XD	(India) Lakshya Sen	(Singapore) Loh Kean Yew
10 January	India Open (Draw): Host: New Delhi, India; Venue: K. D. Jadhav Indoor Stadium; Level: Super 500; Prize: $400,000; Format: 32MS/32WS/32MD/32WD/32XD	Score: 24–22, 21–17	
10 January	India Open (Draw): Host: New Delhi, India; Venue: K. D. Jadhav Indoor Stadium; Level: Super 500; Prize: $400,000; Format: 32MS/32WS/32MD/32WD/32XD	(Thailand) Busanan Ongbamrungphan	(Thailand) Supanida Katethong
10 January	India Open (Draw): Host: New Delhi, India; Venue: K. D. Jadhav Indoor Stadium; Level: Super 500; Prize: $400,000; Format: 32MS/32WS/32MD/32WD/32XD	Score: 22–20, 19–21, 21–13	
10 January	India Open (Draw): Host: New Delhi, India; Venue: K. D. Jadhav Indoor Stadium; Level: Super 500; Prize: $400,000; Format: 32MS/32WS/32MD/32WD/32XD	(India) Satwiksairaj Rankireddy (India) Chirag Shetty	(Indonesia) Mohammad Ahsan (Indonesia) Hendra Setiawan
10 January	India Open (Draw): Host: New Delhi, India; Venue: K. D. Jadhav Indoor Stadium; Level: Super 500; Prize: $400,000; Format: 32MS/32WS/32MD/32WD/32XD	Score: 21–16, 26–24	
10 January	India Open (Draw): Host: New Delhi, India; Venue: K. D. Jadhav Indoor Stadium; Level: Super 500; Prize: $400,000; Format: 32MS/32WS/32MD/32WD/32XD	(Thailand) Benyapa Aimsaard (Thailand) Nuntakarn Aimsaard	(Russia) Anastasiia Akchurina (Russia) Olga Morozova
10 January	India Open (Draw): Host: New Delhi, India; Venue: K. D. Jadhav Indoor Stadium; Level: Super 500; Prize: $400,000; Format: 32MS/32WS/32MD/32WD/32XD	Score: 21–13, 21–5	
10 January	India Open (Draw): Host: New Delhi, India; Venue: K. D. Jadhav Indoor Stadium; Level: Super 500; Prize: $400,000; Format: 32MS/32WS/32MD/32WD/32XD	(Singapore) Terry Hee (Singapore) Tan Wei Han	(Malaysia) Chen Tang Jie (Malaysia) Peck Yen Wei
10 January	India Open (Draw): Host: New Delhi, India; Venue: K. D. Jadhav Indoor Stadium; Level: Super 500; Prize: $400,000; Format: 32MS/32WS/32MD/32WD/32XD	Score: 21–15, 21–18	
10 January	Estonian International: Host: Tallinn, Estonia; Venue: Kalevi Spordihall; Level: International Series; Prize: $5,000; Format: 32MS/32WS/32MD/32WD/32XD	(France) Alex Lanier	(Malaysia) Kok Jing Hong
10 January	Estonian International: Host: Tallinn, Estonia; Venue: Kalevi Spordihall; Level: International Series; Prize: $5,000; Format: 32MS/32WS/32MD/32WD/32XD	Score: 22–20, 21–15	
10 January	Estonian International: Host: Tallinn, Estonia; Venue: Kalevi Spordihall; Level: International Series; Prize: $5,000; Format: 32MS/32WS/32MD/32WD/32XD	(Estonia) Kristin Kuuba	(Thailand) Thamonwan Nithiittikrai
10 January	Estonian International: Host: Tallinn, Estonia; Venue: Kalevi Spordihall; Level: International Series; Prize: $5,000; Format: 32MS/32WS/32MD/32WD/32XD	Score: 19–21, 23–21, 21–15	
10 January	Estonian International: Host: Tallinn, Estonia; Venue: Kalevi Spordihall; Level: International Series; Prize: $5,000; Format: 32MS/32WS/32MD/32WD/32XD	(Thailand) Ruttanapak Oupthong (Thailand) Sirawit Sothon	(Singapore) Danny Bawa Chrisnanta (Singapore) Andy Kwek
10 January	Estonian International: Host: Tallinn, Estonia; Venue: Kalevi Spordihall; Level: International Series; Prize: $5,000; Format: 32MS/32WS/32MD/32WD/32XD	Score: 21–17, 17–21, 21–16	
10 January	Estonian International: Host: Tallinn, Estonia; Venue: Kalevi Spordihall; Level: International Series; Prize: $5,000; Format: 32MS/32WS/32MD/32WD/32XD	(Thailand) Chasinee Korepap (Thailand) Jhenicha Sudjaipraparat	(Russia) Viktoriia Kozyreva (Russia) Mariia Sukhova
10 January	Estonian International: Host: Tallinn, Estonia; Venue: Kalevi Spordihall; Level: International Series; Prize: $5,000; Format: 32MS/32WS/32MD/32WD/32XD	Score: 21–14, 21–15	
10 January	Estonian International: Host: Tallinn, Estonia; Venue: Kalevi Spordihall; Level: International Series; Prize: $5,000; Format: 32MS/32WS/32MD/32WD/32XD	(Thailand) Ratchapol Makkasasithorn (Thailand) Jhenicha Sudjaipraparat	(Thailand) Ruttanapak Oupthong (Thailand) Chasinee Korepap
10 January	Estonian International: Host: Tallinn, Estonia; Venue: Kalevi Spordihall; Level: International Series; Prize: $5,000; Format: 32MS/32WS/32MD/32WD/32XD	Score: 21–15, 21–14	
17 January	Syed Modi International (Draw): Host: Lucknow, India; Venue: Babu Banarasi Das Indoor Stadium; Level: Super 300; Prize: $150,000; Format: 32MS/32WS/32MD/32WD/32XD	(France) Lucas Claerbout (France) Arnaud Merklé	
17 January	Syed Modi International (Draw): Host: Lucknow, India; Venue: Babu Banarasi Das Indoor Stadium; Level: Super 300; Prize: $150,000; Format: 32MS/32WS/32MD/32WD/32XD	Score: Withdrew, not awarded	
17 January	Syed Modi International (Draw): Host: Lucknow, India; Venue: Babu Banarasi Das Indoor Stadium; Level: Super 300; Prize: $150,000; Format: 32MS/32WS/32MD/32WD/32XD	(India) P. V. Sindhu	(India) Malvika Bansod
17 January	Syed Modi International (Draw): Host: Lucknow, India; Venue: Babu Banarasi Das Indoor Stadium; Level: Super 300; Prize: $150,000; Format: 32MS/32WS/32MD/32WD/32XD	Score: 21–13, 21–16	
17 January	Syed Modi International (Draw): Host: Lucknow, India; Venue: Babu Banarasi Das Indoor Stadium; Level: Super 300; Prize: $150,000; Format: 32MS/32WS/32MD/32WD/32XD	(Malaysia) Man Wei Chong (Malaysia) Tee Kai Wun	(India) Krishna Prasad Garaga (India) Vishnuvardhan Goud Panjala
17 January	Syed Modi International (Draw): Host: Lucknow, India; Venue: Babu Banarasi Das Indoor Stadium; Level: Super 300; Prize: $150,000; Format: 32MS/32WS/32MD/32WD/32XD	Score: 21–18, 21–15	
17 January	Syed Modi International (Draw): Host: Lucknow, India; Venue: Babu Banarasi Das Indoor Stadium; Level: Super 300; Prize: $150,000; Format: 32MS/32WS/32MD/32WD/32XD	(Malaysia) Anna Cheong (Malaysia) Teoh Mei Xing	(India) Gayatri Gopichand (India) Treesa Jolly
17 January	Syed Modi International (Draw): Host: Lucknow, India; Venue: Babu Banarasi Das Indoor Stadium; Level: Super 300; Prize: $150,000; Format: 32MS/32WS/32MD/32WD/32XD	Score: 21–12, 21–13	
17 January	Syed Modi International (Draw): Host: Lucknow, India; Venue: Babu Banarasi Das Indoor Stadium; Level: Super 300; Prize: $150,000; Format: 32MS/32WS/32MD/32WD/32XD	(India) Ishaan Bhatnagar (India) Tanisha Crasto	(India) T. Hema Nagendra Babu (India) Srivedya Gurazada
17 January	Syed Modi International (Draw): Host: Lucknow, India; Venue: Babu Banarasi Das Indoor Stadium; Level: Super 300; Prize: $150,000; Format: 32MS/32WS/32MD/32WD/32XD	Score: 21–16, 21–12	
17 January	Swedish Open: Host: Uppsala, Sweden; Venue: IFU Arena; Level: International Series; Prize: $5,000; Format: 32MS/32WS/32MD/32WD/32XD	(Malaysia) Kok Jing Hong	(Malaysia) Yeoh Seng Zoe
17 January	Swedish Open: Host: Uppsala, Sweden; Venue: IFU Arena; Level: International Series; Prize: $5,000; Format: 32MS/32WS/32MD/32WD/32XD	Score: Walkover	
17 January	Swedish Open: Host: Uppsala, Sweden; Venue: IFU Arena; Level: International Series; Prize: $5,000; Format: 32MS/32WS/32MD/32WD/32XD	(Thailand) Pitchamon Opatniput	(Thailand) Pornpicha Choeikeewong
17 January	Swedish Open: Host: Uppsala, Sweden; Venue: IFU Arena; Level: International Series; Prize: $5,000; Format: 32MS/32WS/32MD/32WD/32XD	Score: 16–21, 21–9, 21–16	
17 January	Swedish Open: Host: Uppsala, Sweden; Venue: IFU Arena; Level: International Series; Prize: $5,000; Format: 32MS/32WS/32MD/32WD/32XD	(Singapore) Danny Bawa Chrisnanta (Singapore) Andy Kwek	(Malaysia) Chia Wei Jie (Malaysia) Low Hang Yee
17 January	Swedish Open: Host: Uppsala, Sweden; Venue: IFU Arena; Level: International Series; Prize: $5,000; Format: 32MS/32WS/32MD/32WD/32XD	Score: 21–13, 23–21	
17 January	Swedish Open: Host: Uppsala, Sweden; Venue: IFU Arena; Level: International Series; Prize: $5,000; Format: 32MS/32WS/32MD/32WD/32XD	(Thailand) Chasinee Korepap (Thailand) Jhenicha Sudjaipraparat	(Sweden) Johanna Magnusson (Sweden) Clara Nistad
17 January	Swedish Open: Host: Uppsala, Sweden; Venue: IFU Arena; Level: International Series; Prize: $5,000; Format: 32MS/32WS/32MD/32WD/32XD	Score: 21–16, 23–21	
17 January	Swedish Open: Host: Uppsala, Sweden; Venue: IFU Arena; Level: International Series; Prize: $5,000; Format: 32MS/32WS/32MD/32WD/32XD	(Finland) Anton Kaisti (Czech Republic) Alžběta Bášová	(Denmark) Kristian Kræmer (Denmark) Amalie Cecilie Kudsk
17 January	Swedish Open: Host: Uppsala, Sweden; Venue: IFU Arena; Level: International Series; Prize: $5,000; Format: 32MS/32WS/32MD/32WD/32XD	Score: 21–19, 21–16	
24 January	Odisha Open (Draw): Host: Cuttack, India; Venue: Jawaharlal Nehru Indoor Stadium; Level: Super 100; Prize: $75,000; Format: 48MS/32WS/32MD/32WD/32XD	(India) Kiran George	(India) Priyanshu Rajawat
24 January	Odisha Open (Draw): Host: Cuttack, India; Venue: Jawaharlal Nehru Indoor Stadium; Level: Super 100; Prize: $75,000; Format: 48MS/32WS/32MD/32WD/32XD	Score: 21–15, 14–21, 21–18	
24 January	Odisha Open (Draw): Host: Cuttack, India; Venue: Jawaharlal Nehru Indoor Stadium; Level: Super 100; Prize: $75,000; Format: 48MS/32WS/32MD/32WD/32XD	(India) Unnati Hooda	(India) Smit Toshniwal
24 January	Odisha Open (Draw): Host: Cuttack, India; Venue: Jawaharlal Nehru Indoor Stadium; Level: Super 100; Prize: $75,000; Format: 48MS/32WS/32MD/32WD/32XD	Score: 21–18, 21–11	
24 January	Odisha Open (Draw): Host: Cuttack, India; Venue: Jawaharlal Nehru Indoor Stadium; Level: Super 100; Prize: $75,000; Format: 48MS/32WS/32MD/32WD/32XD	(Malaysia) Nur Mohd Azriyn Ayub (Malaysia) Lim Khim Wah	(India) P. S. Ravikrishna (India) Sankar Prasad Udayakumar
24 January	Odisha Open (Draw): Host: Cuttack, India; Venue: Jawaharlal Nehru Indoor Stadium; Level: Super 100; Prize: $75,000; Format: 48MS/32WS/32MD/32WD/32XD	Score: 18–21, 21–14, 21–16	
24 January	Odisha Open (Draw): Host: Cuttack, India; Venue: Jawaharlal Nehru Indoor Stadium; Level: Super 100; Prize: $75,000; Format: 48MS/32WS/32MD/32WD/32XD	(India) Gayatri Gopichand (India) Treesa Jolly	(India) Sanyogita Ghorpade (India) Shruti Mishra
24 January	Odisha Open (Draw): Host: Cuttack, India; Venue: Jawaharlal Nehru Indoor Stadium; Level: Super 100; Prize: $75,000; Format: 48MS/32WS/32MD/32WD/32XD	Score: 21–12, 21–10	
24 January	Odisha Open (Draw): Host: Cuttack, India; Venue: Jawaharlal Nehru Indoor Stadium; Level: Super 100; Prize: $75,000; Format: 48MS/32WS/32MD/32WD/32XD	(Sri Lanka) Sachin Dias (Sri Lanka) Thilini Hendahewa	(India) Arjun M. R. (India) Treesa Jolly
24 January	Odisha Open (Draw): Host: Cuttack, India; Venue: Jawaharlal Nehru Indoor Stadium; Level: Super 100; Prize: $75,000; Format: 48MS/32WS/32MD/32WD/32XD	Score: 21–16, 22–20	
24 January	Ukraine Open: Host: Kyiv, Ukraine; Venue: Palace of Sports "VENETO Sport"; Level: International Challenge; Prize: $15,000; Format: 32MS/32WS/32MD/16WD/32XD	(France) Christo Popov	(Malaysia) Ong Ken Yon
24 January	Ukraine Open: Host: Kyiv, Ukraine; Venue: Palace of Sports "VENETO Sport"; Level: International Challenge; Prize: $15,000; Format: 32MS/32WS/32MD/16WD/32XD	Score: 21–14, 22–20	
24 January	Ukraine Open: Host: Kyiv, Ukraine; Venue: Palace of Sports "VENETO Sport"; Level: International Challenge; Prize: $15,000; Format: 32MS/32WS/32MD/16WD/32XD	(Turkey) Aliye Demirbağ	(Canada) Wen Yu Zhang
24 January	Ukraine Open: Host: Kyiv, Ukraine; Venue: Palace of Sports "VENETO Sport"; Level: International Challenge; Prize: $15,000; Format: 32MS/32WS/32MD/16WD/32XD	Score: 21–13, 21–16	
24 January	Ukraine Open: Host: Kyiv, Ukraine; Venue: Palace of Sports "VENETO Sport"; Level: International Challenge; Prize: $15,000; Format: 32MS/32WS/32MD/16WD/32XD	(Malaysia) Chia Wei Jie (Malaysia) Low Hang Yee	(Denmark) Emil Lauritzen (Denmark) Mads Vestergaard
24 January	Ukraine Open: Host: Kyiv, Ukraine; Venue: Palace of Sports "VENETO Sport"; Level: International Challenge; Prize: $15,000; Format: 32MS/32WS/32MD/16WD/32XD	Score: 19–21, 22–20, 23–21	
24 January	Ukraine Open: Host: Kyiv, Ukraine; Venue: Palace of Sports "VENETO Sport"; Level: International Challenge; Prize: $15,000; Format: 32MS/32WS/32MD/16WD/32XD	(Germany) Stine Küspert (Germany) Emma Moszczynski	(Ukraine) Mariia Stoliarenko (Ukraine) Yelyzaveta Zharka
24 January	Ukraine Open: Host: Kyiv, Ukraine; Venue: Palace of Sports "VENETO Sport"; Level: International Challenge; Prize: $15,000; Format: 32MS/32WS/32MD/16WD/32XD	Score: 21–18, 21–12	
24 January	Ukraine Open: Host: Kyiv, Ukraine; Venue: Palace of Sports "VENETO Sport"; Level: International Challenge; Prize: $15,000; Format: 32MS/32WS/32MD/16WD/32XD	(Germany) Jones Ralfy Jansen (Germany) Linda Efler	(Germany) Jan Colin Völker (Germany) Stine Küspert
24 January	Ukraine Open: Host: Kyiv, Ukraine; Venue: Palace of Sports "VENETO Sport"; Level: International Challenge; Prize: $15,000; Format: 32MS/32WS/32MD/16WD/32XD	Score: 21–12, 21–11	
24 January	Iceland International (cancelled) (Note: This tournament, originally to be played on 27–30 January, was later cancelled due to the COVID-19 pandemic in Iceland.): Host: Reykjavík, Iceland; Venue: Tennis- og Badmintonfélag Reykjavíkur; Level: Future Series; Format: 32MS/32WS/32MD/8WD/32XD		
24 January	Iceland International (cancelled): Host: Reykjavík, Iceland; Venue: Tennis- og Badmintonfélag Reykjavíkur; Level: Future Series; Format: 32MS/32WS/32MD/8WD/32XD	Score:	
24 January	Iceland International (cancelled): Host: Reykjavík, Iceland; Venue: Tennis- og Badmintonfélag Reykjavíkur; Level: Future Series; Format: 32MS/32WS/32MD/8WD/32XD	Score:	
24 January	Iceland International (cancelled): Host: Reykjavík, Iceland; Venue: Tennis- og Badmintonfélag Reykjavíkur; Level: Future Series; Format: 32MS/32WS/32MD/8WD/32XD	Score:	
24 January	Iceland International (cancelled): Host: Reykjavík, Iceland; Venue: Tennis- og Badmintonfélag Reykjavíkur; Level: Future Series; Format: 32MS/32WS/32MD/8WD/32XD	Score:	
24 January	Iceland International (cancelled): Host: Reykjavík, Iceland; Venue: Tennis- og Badmintonfélag Reykjavíkur; Level: Future Series; Format: 32MS/32WS/32MD/8WD/32XD	Score:	

=== February ===
Week commencing	Tournament	Champions	Runners-up
7 February	Iran Fajr International: Host: Shiraz, Iran; Venue: Shahid Dastgheib Sport Complex; Level: International Challenge; Prize: $25,000; Format: 64MS/64WS/32MD/16WD	(India) Meiraba Luwang Maisnam	(Ukraine) Danylo Bosniuk
7 February	Iran Fajr International: Host: Shiraz, Iran; Venue: Shahid Dastgheib Sport Complex; Level: International Challenge; Prize: $25,000; Format: 64MS/64WS/32MD/16WD	Score: 18–21, 21–13, 21–19	
7 February	Iran Fajr International: Host: Shiraz, Iran; Venue: Shahid Dastgheib Sport Complex; Level: International Challenge; Prize: $25,000; Format: 64MS/64WS/32MD/16WD	(India) Tasnim Mir	(Indonesia) Yulia Yosephine Susanto
7 February	Iran Fajr International: Host: Shiraz, Iran; Venue: Shahid Dastgheib Sport Complex; Level: International Challenge; Prize: $25,000; Format: 64MS/64WS/32MD/16WD	Score: 21–11, 11–21, 21–7	
7 February	Iran Fajr International: Host: Shiraz, Iran; Venue: Shahid Dastgheib Sport Complex; Level: International Challenge; Prize: $25,000; Format: 64MS/64WS/32MD/16WD	(Indonesia) Abiyyu Fauzan Majid (Indonesia) Ferdian Mahardika Ranialdy	(Iran) Amir Jabbari (Iran) Mehran Shahbazi
7 February	Iran Fajr International: Host: Shiraz, Iran; Venue: Shahid Dastgheib Sport Complex; Level: International Challenge; Prize: $25,000; Format: 64MS/64WS/32MD/16WD	Score: 21–15, 21–12	
7 February	Iran Fajr International: Host: Shiraz, Iran; Venue: Shahid Dastgheib Sport Complex; Level: International Challenge; Prize: $25,000; Format: 64MS/64WS/32MD/16WD	(Russia) Ekaterina Malkova (Russia) Anastasiia Shapovalova	(Iran) Hajar Kabiri (Iran) Saghar Rafei
7 February	Iran Fajr International: Host: Shiraz, Iran; Venue: Shahid Dastgheib Sport Complex; Level: International Challenge; Prize: $25,000; Format: 64MS/64WS/32MD/16WD	Score: 21–3, 21–13	
14 February	Badminton Asia Team Championships (Draw): Host: Selangor, Malaysia; Venue: Setia City Convention Centre; Level: Team Event; Format: 8 MT / 7 WT	Malaysia	Indonesia
14 February	Badminton Asia Team Championships (Draw): Host: Selangor, Malaysia; Venue: Setia City Convention Centre; Level: Team Event; Format: 8 MT / 7 WT	Lee Zii Jia	Chico Aura Dwi Wardoyo
14 February	Badminton Asia Team Championships (Draw): Host: Selangor, Malaysia; Venue: Setia City Convention Centre; Level: Team Event; Format: 8 MT / 7 WT	Aaron Chia; Soh Wooi Yik	Leo Rolly Carnando; Daniel Marthin
14 February	Badminton Asia Team Championships (Draw): Host: Selangor, Malaysia; Venue: Setia City Convention Centre; Level: Team Event; Format: 8 MT / 7 WT	Ng Tze Yong	Ikhsan Rumbay
14 February	Badminton Asia Team Championships (Draw): Host: Selangor, Malaysia; Venue: Setia City Convention Centre; Level: Team Event; Format: 8 MT / 7 WT	Goh Sze Fei; Nur Izzuddin	Muhammad Shohibul Fikri; Bagas Maulana
14 February	Badminton Asia Team Championships (Draw): Host: Selangor, Malaysia; Venue: Setia City Convention Centre; Level: Team Event; Format: 8 MT / 7 WT	Leong Jun Hao	Christian Adinata
14 February	Badminton Asia Team Championships (Draw): Host: Selangor, Malaysia; Venue: Setia City Convention Centre; Level: Team Event; Format: 8 MT / 7 WT	Score: 3–0	
14 February	Badminton Asia Team Championships (Draw): Host: Selangor, Malaysia; Venue: Setia City Convention Centre; Level: Team Event; Format: 8 MT / 7 WT	Indonesia	South Korea
14 February	Badminton Asia Team Championships (Draw): Host: Selangor, Malaysia; Venue: Setia City Convention Centre; Level: Team Event; Format: 8 MT / 7 WT	Gregoria Mariska Tunjung	Sim Yu-jin
14 February	Badminton Asia Team Championships (Draw): Host: Selangor, Malaysia; Venue: Setia City Convention Centre; Level: Team Event; Format: 8 MT / 7 WT	Febriana Dwipuji Kusuma; Amalia Cahaya Pratiwi	Baek Ha-na; Seong Seung-yeon
14 February	Badminton Asia Team Championships (Draw): Host: Selangor, Malaysia; Venue: Setia City Convention Centre; Level: Team Event; Format: 8 MT / 7 WT	Putri Kusuma Wardani	Lee Se-yeon
14 February	Badminton Asia Team Championships (Draw): Host: Selangor, Malaysia; Venue: Setia City Convention Centre; Level: Team Event; Format: 8 MT / 7 WT	Nita Violina Marwah; Lanny Tria Mayasari	Kim Min-ji; Park Min-jeong
14 February	Badminton Asia Team Championships (Draw): Host: Selangor, Malaysia; Venue: Setia City Convention Centre; Level: Team Event; Format: 8 MT / 7 WT	Stephanie Widjaja	Lee Seo-jin
14 February	Badminton Asia Team Championships (Draw): Host: Selangor, Malaysia; Venue: Setia City Convention Centre; Level: Team Event; Format: 8 MT / 7 WT	Score: 3–1	
14 February	European Men's and Women's Team Badminton Championships (Draw) (cancelled) (Note: This tournament, originally to be played on 15–20 February, was later cancelled due to the COVID-19 pandemic in Finland.): Host: Lahti, Finland; Venue: Lahti Energia Arena; Level: Team Event; Format: TBD		
14 February	European Men's and Women's Team Badminton Championships (Draw) (cancelled): Host: Lahti, Finland; Venue: Lahti Energia Arena; Level: Team Event; Format: TBD	Score:	
14 February	European Men's and Women's Team Badminton Championships (Draw) (cancelled): Host: Lahti, Finland; Venue: Lahti Energia Arena; Level: Team Event; Format: TBD	Score:	
14 February	Pan Am Badminton Team Championships (Draw): Host: Acapulco, Guerrero, Mexico; Venue: Mundo Imperial; Level: Team Event; Format: 6 MT / 6 WT	Canada	Brazil
14 February	Pan Am Badminton Team Championships (Draw): Host: Acapulco, Guerrero, Mexico; Venue: Mundo Imperial; Level: Team Event; Format: 6 MT / 6 WT	Brian Yang	Ygor Coelho
14 February	Pan Am Badminton Team Championships (Draw): Host: Acapulco, Guerrero, Mexico; Venue: Mundo Imperial; Level: Team Event; Format: 6 MT / 6 WT	B. R. Sankeerth	Jonathan Matias
14 February	Pan Am Badminton Team Championships (Draw): Host: Acapulco, Guerrero, Mexico; Venue: Mundo Imperial; Level: Team Event; Format: 6 MT / 6 WT	Victor Lai	Donnians Oliveira
14 February	Pan Am Badminton Team Championships (Draw): Host: Acapulco, Guerrero, Mexico; Venue: Mundo Imperial; Level: Team Event; Format: 6 MT / 6 WT	Nyl Yakura / Brian Yang	Fabricio Farias / Francielton Farias
14 February	Pan Am Badminton Team Championships (Draw): Host: Acapulco, Guerrero, Mexico; Venue: Mundo Imperial; Level: Team Event; Format: 6 MT / 6 WT	Kevin Lee / Ty Alexander Lindeman	Jonathan Matias / Artur Silva Pomoceno
14 February	Pan Am Badminton Team Championships (Draw): Host: Acapulco, Guerrero, Mexico; Venue: Mundo Imperial; Level: Team Event; Format: 6 MT / 6 WT	Score: 3–2	
14 February	Pan Am Badminton Team Championships (Draw): Host: Acapulco, Guerrero, Mexico; Venue: Mundo Imperial; Level: Team Event; Format: 6 MT / 6 WT	United States	Canada
14 February	Pan Am Badminton Team Championships (Draw): Host: Acapulco, Guerrero, Mexico; Venue: Mundo Imperial; Level: Team Event; Format: 6 MT / 6 WT	Lauren Lam	Wen Yu Zhang
14 February	Pan Am Badminton Team Championships (Draw): Host: Acapulco, Guerrero, Mexico; Venue: Mundo Imperial; Level: Team Event; Format: 6 MT / 6 WT	Jennie Gai	Camille Leblanc
14 February	Pan Am Badminton Team Championships (Draw): Host: Acapulco, Guerrero, Mexico; Venue: Mundo Imperial; Level: Team Event; Format: 6 MT / 6 WT	Natalie Chi	Eliana Zhang
14 February	Pan Am Badminton Team Championships (Draw): Host: Acapulco, Guerrero, Mexico; Venue: Mundo Imperial; Level: Team Event; Format: 6 MT / 6 WT	Francesca Corbett / Allison Lee	Catherine Choi / Crystal Lai
14 February	Pan Am Badminton Team Championships (Draw): Host: Acapulco, Guerrero, Mexico; Venue: Mundo Imperial; Level: Team Event; Format: 6 MT / 6 WT	Jennie Gai / Sanchita Pandey	Josephine Wu / Eliana Zhang
14 February	Pan Am Badminton Team Championships (Draw): Host: Acapulco, Guerrero, Mexico; Venue: Mundo Imperial; Level: Team Event; Format: 6 MT / 6 WT	Score: 3–0	
14 February	Oceania Men's & Women's Team Badminton Championships (Draw) (cancelled) (Note: This tournament, originally to be played on 18–20 February, was later cancelled due to the COVID-19 pandemic in New Zealand.): Host: Auckland, New Zealand; Venue: Badminton North Harbour Centre; Level: Continental Team Championships; Format: TBD Teams (Round robin)		
14 February	Oceania Men's & Women's Team Badminton Championships (Draw) (cancelled): Host: Auckland, New Zealand; Venue: Badminton North Harbour Centre; Level: Continental Team Championships; Format: TBD Teams (Round robin)	Score:	
14 February	All Africa Men's and Women's Team Badminton Championships (Draw): Host: Kampala, Uganda; Venue: MTN Arena; Level: Team Event; Format: 10 MT / 7 WT	Algeria	Egypt
14 February	All Africa Men's and Women's Team Badminton Championships (Draw): Host: Kampala, Uganda; Venue: MTN Arena; Level: Team Event; Format: 10 MT / 7 WT	Youcef Sabri Medel	Adham Hatem Elgamal
14 February	All Africa Men's and Women's Team Badminton Championships (Draw): Host: Kampala, Uganda; Venue: MTN Arena; Level: Team Event; Format: 10 MT / 7 WT	Mohamed Abderrahime Belarbi	Ahmed Salah
14 February	All Africa Men's and Women's Team Badminton Championships (Draw): Host: Kampala, Uganda; Venue: MTN Arena; Level: Team Event; Format: 10 MT / 7 WT	Adel Hamek	Mohamed Mostafa Kamel
14 February	All Africa Men's and Women's Team Badminton Championships (Draw): Host: Kampala, Uganda; Venue: MTN Arena; Level: Team Event; Format: 10 MT / 7 WT	Koceila Mammeri / Youcef Sabri Medel	Kareem Mahmoud Ahmed / Adham Hatem Elgamal
14 February	All Africa Men's and Women's Team Badminton Championships (Draw): Host: Kampala, Uganda; Venue: MTN Arena; Level: Team Event; Format: 10 MT / 7 WT	Mohamed Abderrahime Belarbi / Adel Hamek	Abdelrahman Abdelhakim / Ahmed Salah
14 February	All Africa Men's and Women's Team Badminton Championships (Draw): Host: Kampala, Uganda; Venue: MTN Arena; Level: Team Event; Format: 10 MT / 7 WT	Score: 3–0	
14 February	All Africa Men's and Women's Team Badminton Championships (Draw): Host: Kampala, Uganda; Venue: MTN Arena; Level: Team Event; Format: 10 MT / 7 WT	Egypt	Uganda
14 February	All Africa Men's and Women's Team Badminton Championships (Draw): Host: Kampala, Uganda; Venue: MTN Arena; Level: Team Event; Format: 10 MT / 7 WT	Doha Hany	Fadilah Mohamed Rafi
14 February	All Africa Men's and Women's Team Badminton Championships (Draw): Host: Kampala, Uganda; Venue: MTN Arena; Level: Team Event; Format: 10 MT / 7 WT	Nour Ahmed Youssri	Tracy Naluwooza
14 February	All Africa Men's and Women's Team Badminton Championships (Draw): Host: Kampala, Uganda; Venue: MTN Arena; Level: Team Event; Format: 10 MT / 7 WT	Jana Abdelkader	Husina Kobugabe
14 February	All Africa Men's and Women's Team Badminton Championships (Draw): Host: Kampala, Uganda; Venue: MTN Arena; Level: Team Event; Format: 10 MT / 7 WT	Doha Hany / Jana Abdelkader	Brenda Awor / Tracy Naluwooza
14 February	All Africa Men's and Women's Team Badminton Championships (Draw): Host: Kampala, Uganda; Venue: MTN Arena; Level: Team Event; Format: 10 MT / 7 WT	Nour Ahmed Youssri / Hana Tarek	Husina Kobugabe / Fadilah Mohamed Rafi
14 February	All Africa Men's and Women's Team Badminton Championships (Draw): Host: Kampala, Uganda; Venue: MTN Arena; Level: Team Event; Format: 10 MT / 7 WT	Score: 3–1	
14 February	African Badminton Championships (Draw): Host: Kampala, Uganda; Venue: MTN Arena; Level: Continental Championships; Format: 64MS/64WS/32MD/16WD/32XD	(Nigeria) Anuoluwapo Juwon Opeyori	(Uganda) Brian Kasirye
14 February	African Badminton Championships (Draw): Host: Kampala, Uganda; Venue: MTN Arena; Level: Continental Championships; Format: 64MS/64WS/32MD/16WD/32XD	Score: 21–14, 23–21	
14 February	African Badminton Championships (Draw): Host: Kampala, Uganda; Venue: MTN Arena; Level: Continental Championships; Format: 64MS/64WS/32MD/16WD/32XD	(Egypt) Nour Ahmed Youssri	(Egypt) Doha Hany
14 February	African Badminton Championships (Draw): Host: Kampala, Uganda; Venue: MTN Arena; Level: Continental Championships; Format: 64MS/64WS/32MD/16WD/32XD	Score: 21–16, 21–16	
14 February	African Badminton Championships (Draw): Host: Kampala, Uganda; Venue: MTN Arena; Level: Continental Championships; Format: 64MS/64WS/32MD/16WD/32XD	(Algeria) Koceila Mammeri (Algeria) Youcef Sabri Medel	(Egypt) Adham Hatem Elgamal (Egypt) Ahmed Salah
14 February	African Badminton Championships (Draw): Host: Kampala, Uganda; Venue: MTN Arena; Level: Continental Championships; Format: 64MS/64WS/32MD/16WD/32XD	Score: 21–23, 21–19, 21–18	
14 February	African Badminton Championships (Draw): Host: Kampala, Uganda; Venue: MTN Arena; Level: Continental Championships; Format: 64MS/64WS/32MD/16WD/32XD	(Mauritius) Lorna Bodha (Mauritius) Kobita Dookhee	(South Africa) Amy Ackerman (South Africa) Deidre Laurens Jordaan
14 February	African Badminton Championships (Draw): Host: Kampala, Uganda; Venue: MTN Arena; Level: Continental Championships; Format: 64MS/64WS/32MD/16WD/32XD	Score: 21–18, 22–20	
14 February	African Badminton Championships (Draw): Host: Kampala, Uganda; Venue: MTN Arena; Level: Continental Championships; Format: 64MS/64WS/32MD/16WD/32XD	(Algeria) Koceila Mammeri (Algeria) Tanina Mammeri	(South Africa) Jarred Elliott (South Africa) Amy Ackerman
14 February	African Badminton Championships (Draw): Host: Kampala, Uganda; Venue: MTN Arena; Level: Continental Championships; Format: 64MS/64WS/32MD/16WD/32XD	Score: 21–13, 21–14	
21 February	Uganda International: Host: Kampala, Uganda; Venue: MTN Arena; Level: International Challenge; Prize: $15,000; Format: 32MS/32WS/32MD/32WD/32XD	(France) Arnaud Merklé	(India) Harshit Aggarwal
21 February	Uganda International: Host: Kampala, Uganda; Venue: MTN Arena; Level: International Challenge; Prize: $15,000; Format: 32MS/32WS/32MD/32WD/32XD	Score: 21–15, 18–21, 21–16	
21 February	Uganda International: Host: Kampala, Uganda; Venue: MTN Arena; Level: International Challenge; Prize: $15,000; Format: 32MS/32WS/32MD/32WD/32XD	(Canada) Talia Ng	(India) Mansi Singh
21 February	Uganda International: Host: Kampala, Uganda; Venue: MTN Arena; Level: International Challenge; Prize: $15,000; Format: 32MS/32WS/32MD/32WD/32XD	Score: 21–10, 21–12	
21 February	Uganda International: Host: Kampala, Uganda; Venue: MTN Arena; Level: International Challenge; Prize: $15,000; Format: 32MS/32WS/32MD/32WD/32XD	(Malaysia) Boon Xin Yuan (Malaysia) Wong Tien Ci	(Germany) Jones Ralfy Jansen (Germany) Jan Colin Völker
21 February	Uganda International: Host: Kampala, Uganda; Venue: MTN Arena; Level: International Challenge; Prize: $15,000; Format: 32MS/32WS/32MD/32WD/32XD	Score: 21–15, 21–14	
21 February	Uganda International: Host: Kampala, Uganda; Venue: MTN Arena; Level: International Challenge; Prize: $15,000; Format: 32MS/32WS/32MD/32WD/32XD	(Malaysia) Kasturi Radhakrishnan (Malaysia) Venosha Radhakrishnan	(Italy) Martina Corsini (Italy) Judith Mair
21 February	Uganda International: Host: Kampala, Uganda; Venue: MTN Arena; Level: International Challenge; Prize: $15,000; Format: 32MS/32WS/32MD/32WD/32XD	Score: 21–18, 21–19	
21 February	Uganda International: Host: Kampala, Uganda; Venue: MTN Arena; Level: International Challenge; Prize: $15,000; Format: 32MS/32WS/32MD/32WD/32XD	(Algeria) Koceila Mammeri (Algeria) Tanina Mammeri	(India) Senthil Vel Govindarasu (Malaysia) Venosha Radhakrishnan
21 February	Uganda International: Host: Kampala, Uganda; Venue: MTN Arena; Level: International Challenge; Prize: $15,000; Format: 32MS/32WS/32MD/32WD/32XD	Score: 19–21, 21–18, 22–20	
28 February	Spain Masters (Draw) (cancelled) (Note: This tournament, originally to be played on 1–6 March, was later cancelled due to the COVID-19 pandemic in Spain.): Host: Huelva, Spain; Venue: Palacio de los Deportes Carolina Marín; Level: Super 300; Prize: $180,000; Format: 32MS/32WS/32MD/32WD/32XD		
28 February	Spain Masters (Draw) (cancelled): Host: Huelva, Spain; Venue: Palacio de los Deportes Carolina Marín; Level: Super 300; Prize: $180,000; Format: 32MS/32WS/32MD/32WD/32XD	Score:	
28 February	Spain Masters (Draw) (cancelled): Host: Huelva, Spain; Venue: Palacio de los Deportes Carolina Marín; Level: Super 300; Prize: $180,000; Format: 32MS/32WS/32MD/32WD/32XD	Score:	
28 February	Spain Masters (Draw) (cancelled): Host: Huelva, Spain; Venue: Palacio de los Deportes Carolina Marín; Level: Super 300; Prize: $180,000; Format: 32MS/32WS/32MD/32WD/32XD	Score:	
28 February	Spain Masters (Draw) (cancelled): Host: Huelva, Spain; Venue: Palacio de los Deportes Carolina Marín; Level: Super 300; Prize: $180,000; Format: 32MS/32WS/32MD/32WD/32XD	Score:	
28 February	Spain Masters (Draw) (cancelled): Host: Huelva, Spain; Venue: Palacio de los Deportes Carolina Marín; Level: Super 300; Prize: $180,000; Format: 32MS/32WS/32MD/32WD/32XD	Score:	
28 February	Slovak Open: Host: Trenčín, Slovakia; Venue: Športové centrum M-Šport; Level: Future Series; Format: 32MS/32WS/32MD/32WD/32XD	(Japan) Riku Hatano	(Chinese Taipei) Chi Yu-jen
28 February	Slovak Open: Host: Trenčín, Slovakia; Venue: Športové centrum M-Šport; Level: Future Series; Format: 32MS/32WS/32MD/32WD/32XD	Score: 21–17, 21–15	
28 February	Slovak Open: Host: Trenčín, Slovakia; Venue: Športové centrum M-Šport; Level: Future Series; Format: 32MS/32WS/32MD/32WD/32XD	(India) Aditi Bhatt	(Chinese Taipei) Hsu Wen-chi
28 February	Slovak Open: Host: Trenčín, Slovakia; Venue: Športové centrum M-Šport; Level: Future Series; Format: 32MS/32WS/32MD/32WD/32XD	Score: 19–21, 21–10, 25–23	
28 February	Slovak Open: Host: Trenčín, Slovakia; Venue: Športové centrum M-Šport; Level: Future Series; Format: 32MS/32WS/32MD/32WD/32XD	(Malaysia) Boon Xin Yuan (Malaysia) Wong Tien Ci	(Hong Kong) Law Cheuk Him (Hong Kong) Lee Chun Hei
28 February	Slovak Open: Host: Trenčín, Slovakia; Venue: Športové centrum M-Šport; Level: Future Series; Format: 32MS/32WS/32MD/32WD/32XD	Score: 21–18, 14–21, 21–19	
28 February	Slovak Open: Host: Trenčín, Slovakia; Venue: Športové centrum M-Šport; Level: Future Series; Format: 32MS/32WS/32MD/32WD/32XD	(Chinese Taipei) Lee Chia-hsin (Chinese Taipei) Teng Chun-hsun	No competitors
28 February	Slovak Open: Host: Trenčín, Slovakia; Venue: Športové centrum M-Šport; Level: Future Series; Format: 32MS/32WS/32MD/32WD/32XD	Score: Walkover	
28 February	Slovak Open: Host: Trenčín, Slovakia; Venue: Športové centrum M-Šport; Level: Future Series; Format: 32MS/32WS/32MD/32WD/32XD	(Hong Kong) Yeung Ming Nok (Hong Kong) Yeung Pui Lam	(Poland) Wiktor Trecki (Poland) Magdalena Świerczyńska
28 February	Slovak Open: Host: Trenčín, Slovakia; Venue: Športové centrum M-Šport; Level: Future Series; Format: 32MS/32WS/32MD/32WD/32XD	Score: 21–16, 21–12	

=== March ===
Week commencing	Tournament	Champions	Runners-up
7 March	German Open (Draw): Host: Mülheim, Germany; Venue: Westenergie Sporthalle; Level: Super 300; Prize: $180,000; Format: 32MS/32WS/32MD/32WD/32XD	(Thailand) Kunlavut Vitidsarn	(India) Lakshya Sen
7 March	German Open (Draw): Host: Mülheim, Germany; Venue: Westenergie Sporthalle; Level: Super 300; Prize: $180,000; Format: 32MS/32WS/32MD/32WD/32XD	Score: 21–18, 21–15	
7 March	German Open (Draw): Host: Mülheim, Germany; Venue: Westenergie Sporthalle; Level: Super 300; Prize: $180,000; Format: 32MS/32WS/32MD/32WD/32XD	(China) He Bingjiao	(China) Chen Yufei
7 March	German Open (Draw): Host: Mülheim, Germany; Venue: Westenergie Sporthalle; Level: Super 300; Prize: $180,000; Format: 32MS/32WS/32MD/32WD/32XD	Score: 21–14, 27–25	
7 March	German Open (Draw): Host: Mülheim, Germany; Venue: Westenergie Sporthalle; Level: Super 300; Prize: $180,000; Format: 32MS/32WS/32MD/32WD/32XD	(Malaysia) Goh Sze Fei (Malaysia) Nur Izzuddin	(China) Liu Yuchen (China) Ou Xuanyi
7 March	German Open (Draw): Host: Mülheim, Germany; Venue: Westenergie Sporthalle; Level: Super 300; Prize: $180,000; Format: 32MS/32WS/32MD/32WD/32XD	Score: 23–21, 16–21, 21–14	
7 March	German Open (Draw): Host: Mülheim, Germany; Venue: Westenergie Sporthalle; Level: Super 300; Prize: $180,000; Format: 32MS/32WS/32MD/32WD/32XD	(China) Chen Qingchen (China) Jia Yifan	(Bulgaria) Gabriela Stoeva (Bulgaria) Stefani Stoeva
7 March	German Open (Draw): Host: Mülheim, Germany; Venue: Westenergie Sporthalle; Level: Super 300; Prize: $180,000; Format: 32MS/32WS/32MD/32WD/32XD	Score: 21–16, 29–30, 21–19	
7 March	German Open (Draw): Host: Mülheim, Germany; Venue: Westenergie Sporthalle; Level: Super 300; Prize: $180,000; Format: 32MS/32WS/32MD/32WD/32XD	(Thailand) Dechapol Puavaranukroh (Thailand) Sapsiree Taerattanachai	(China) Ou Xuanyi (China) Huang Yaqiong
7 March	German Open (Draw): Host: Mülheim, Germany; Venue: Westenergie Sporthalle; Level: Super 300; Prize: $180,000; Format: 32MS/32WS/32MD/32WD/32XD	Score: 21–11, 21–9	
7 March	Portugal International: Host: Caldas da Rainha, Portugal; Venue: Badminton High Performance Sports Centre; Level: International Series; Prize: $10,000; Format: 32MS/32WS/32MD/32WD/32XD	(Indonesia) Andi Fadel Muhammad	(Denmark) Karan Rajan Rajarajan
7 March	Portugal International: Host: Caldas da Rainha, Portugal; Venue: Badminton High Performance Sports Centre; Level: International Series; Prize: $10,000; Format: 32MS/32WS/32MD/32WD/32XD	Score: 21–11, 21–18	
7 March	Portugal International: Host: Caldas da Rainha, Portugal; Venue: Badminton High Performance Sports Centre; Level: International Series; Prize: $10,000; Format: 32MS/32WS/32MD/32WD/32XD	(Chinese Taipei) Hsu Wen-chi	(Hong Kong) Yeung Sum Yee
7 March	Portugal International: Host: Caldas da Rainha, Portugal; Venue: Badminton High Performance Sports Centre; Level: International Series; Prize: $10,000; Format: 32MS/32WS/32MD/32WD/32XD	Score: 21–13, 21–17	
7 March	Portugal International: Host: Caldas da Rainha, Portugal; Venue: Badminton High Performance Sports Centre; Level: International Series; Prize: $10,000; Format: 32MS/32WS/32MD/32WD/32XD	(Chinese Taipei) Su Ching-heng (Chinese Taipei) Ye Hong-wei	(Chinese Taipei) Wei Chun-wei (Chinese Taipei) Wu Guan-xun
7 March	Portugal International: Host: Caldas da Rainha, Portugal; Venue: Badminton High Performance Sports Centre; Level: International Series; Prize: $10,000; Format: 32MS/32WS/32MD/32WD/32XD	Score: 21–13, 21–14	
7 March	Portugal International: Host: Caldas da Rainha, Portugal; Venue: Badminton High Performance Sports Centre; Level: International Series; Prize: $10,000; Format: 32MS/32WS/32MD/32WD/32XD	(Hong Kong) Yeung Nga Ting (Hong Kong) Yeung Pui Lam	(France) Sharone Bauer (France) Vimala Hériau
7 March	Portugal International: Host: Caldas da Rainha, Portugal; Venue: Badminton High Performance Sports Centre; Level: International Series; Prize: $10,000; Format: 32MS/32WS/32MD/32WD/32XD	Score: 21–14, 21–8	
7 March	Portugal International: Host: Caldas da Rainha, Portugal; Venue: Badminton High Performance Sports Centre; Level: International Series; Prize: $10,000; Format: 32MS/32WS/32MD/32WD/32XD	(Chinese Taipei) Ye Hong-wei (Chinese Taipei) Lee Chia-hsin	(Germany) Jan Colin Völker (Germany) Stine Küspert
7 March	Portugal International: Host: Caldas da Rainha, Portugal; Venue: Badminton High Performance Sports Centre; Level: International Series; Prize: $10,000; Format: 32MS/32WS/32MD/32WD/32XD	Score: 21–10, 19–21, 21–9	
16 March	All England Open (Draw): Host: Birmingham, England; Venue: Utilita Arena Birmingham; Level: Super 1000; Prize: $1,000,000; Format: 32MS/32WS/32MD/32WD/32XD	(Denmark) Viktor Axelsen	(India) Lakshya Sen
16 March	All England Open (Draw): Host: Birmingham, England; Venue: Utilita Arena Birmingham; Level: Super 1000; Prize: $1,000,000; Format: 32MS/32WS/32MD/32WD/32XD	Score: 21–10, 21–15	
16 March	All England Open (Draw): Host: Birmingham, England; Venue: Utilita Arena Birmingham; Level: Super 1000; Prize: $1,000,000; Format: 32MS/32WS/32MD/32WD/32XD	(Japan) Akane Yamaguchi	(South Korea) An Se-young
16 March	All England Open (Draw): Host: Birmingham, England; Venue: Utilita Arena Birmingham; Level: Super 1000; Prize: $1,000,000; Format: 32MS/32WS/32MD/32WD/32XD	Score: 21–15, 21–15	
16 March	All England Open (Draw): Host: Birmingham, England; Venue: Utilita Arena Birmingham; Level: Super 1000; Prize: $1,000,000; Format: 32MS/32WS/32MD/32WD/32XD	(Indonesia) Muhammad Shohibul Fikri (Indonesia) Bagas Maulana	(Indonesia) Mohammad Ahsan (Indonesia) Hendra Setiawan
16 March	All England Open (Draw): Host: Birmingham, England; Venue: Utilita Arena Birmingham; Level: Super 1000; Prize: $1,000,000; Format: 32MS/32WS/32MD/32WD/32XD	Score: 21–19, 21–13	
16 March	All England Open (Draw): Host: Birmingham, England; Venue: Utilita Arena Birmingham; Level: Super 1000; Prize: $1,000,000; Format: 32MS/32WS/32MD/32WD/32XD	(Japan) Nami Matsuyama (Japan) Chiharu Shida	(China) Zhang Shuxian (China) Zheng Yu
16 March	All England Open (Draw): Host: Birmingham, England; Venue: Utilita Arena Birmingham; Level: Super 1000; Prize: $1,000,000; Format: 32MS/32WS/32MD/32WD/32XD	Score: 21–13, 21–9	
16 March	All England Open (Draw): Host: Birmingham, England; Venue: Utilita Arena Birmingham; Level: Super 1000; Prize: $1,000,000; Format: 32MS/32WS/32MD/32WD/32XD	(Japan) Yuta Watanabe (Japan) Arisa Higashino	(China) Wang Yilyu (China) Huang Dongping
16 March	All England Open (Draw): Host: Birmingham, England; Venue: Utilita Arena Birmingham; Level: Super 1000; Prize: $1,000,000; Format: 32MS/32WS/32MD/32WD/32XD	Score: 21–19, 21–19	
16 March	Giraldilla International (Cancelled) (Note: This tournament, originally to be played on 16–20 March, was later cancelled due to the COVID-19 pandemic in Cuba.): Host: Havana, Cuba; Venue: Coliseo de la Ciudad Deportiva; Level: Future Series; Format: 32MS/16WS/8MD/8WD/16XD		
16 March	Giraldilla International (Cancelled): Host: Havana, Cuba; Venue: Coliseo de la Ciudad Deportiva; Level: Future Series; Format: 32MS/16WS/8MD/8WD/16XD	Score:	
16 March	Giraldilla International (Cancelled): Host: Havana, Cuba; Venue: Coliseo de la Ciudad Deportiva; Level: Future Series; Format: 32MS/16WS/8MD/8WD/16XD	Score:	
16 March	Giraldilla International (Cancelled): Host: Havana, Cuba; Venue: Coliseo de la Ciudad Deportiva; Level: Future Series; Format: 32MS/16WS/8MD/8WD/16XD	Score:	
16 March	Giraldilla International (Cancelled): Host: Havana, Cuba; Venue: Coliseo de la Ciudad Deportiva; Level: Future Series; Format: 32MS/16WS/8MD/8WD/16XD	Score:	
16 March	Giraldilla International (Cancelled): Host: Havana, Cuba; Venue: Coliseo de la Ciudad Deportiva; Level: Future Series; Format: 32MS/16WS/8MD/8WD/16XD	Score:	
21 March	Swiss Open (Draw): Host: Basel, Switzerland; Venue: St. Jakobshalle; Level: Super 300; Prize: $180,000; Format: 32MS/32WS/32MD/32WD/32XD	(Indonesia) Jonatan Christie	(India) Prannoy H. S.
21 March	Swiss Open (Draw): Host: Basel, Switzerland; Venue: St. Jakobshalle; Level: Super 300; Prize: $180,000; Format: 32MS/32WS/32MD/32WD/32XD	Score: 21–12, 21–18	
21 March	Swiss Open (Draw): Host: Basel, Switzerland; Venue: St. Jakobshalle; Level: Super 300; Prize: $180,000; Format: 32MS/32WS/32MD/32WD/32XD	(India) P. V. Sindhu	(Thailand) Busanan Ongbamrungphan
21 March	Swiss Open (Draw): Host: Basel, Switzerland; Venue: St. Jakobshalle; Level: Super 300; Prize: $180,000; Format: 32MS/32WS/32MD/32WD/32XD	Score: 21–16, 21–8	
21 March	Swiss Open (Draw): Host: Basel, Switzerland; Venue: St. Jakobshalle; Level: Super 300; Prize: $180,000; Format: 32MS/32WS/32MD/32WD/32XD	(Indonesia) Fajar Alfian (Indonesia) Muhammad Rian Ardianto	(Malaysia) Goh Sze Fei (Malaysia) Nur Izzuddin
21 March	Swiss Open (Draw): Host: Basel, Switzerland; Venue: St. Jakobshalle; Level: Super 300; Prize: $180,000; Format: 32MS/32WS/32MD/32WD/32XD	Score: 21–18, 21–19	
21 March	Swiss Open (Draw): Host: Basel, Switzerland; Venue: St. Jakobshalle; Level: Super 300; Prize: $180,000; Format: 32MS/32WS/32MD/32WD/32XD	(Bulgaria) Gabriela Stoeva (Bulgaria) Stefani Stoeva	(Germany) Linda Efler (Germany) Isabel Lohau
21 March	Swiss Open (Draw): Host: Basel, Switzerland; Venue: St. Jakobshalle; Level: Super 300; Prize: $180,000; Format: 32MS/32WS/32MD/32WD/32XD	Score: 21–14, 21–12	
21 March	Swiss Open (Draw): Host: Basel, Switzerland; Venue: St. Jakobshalle; Level: Super 300; Prize: $180,000; Format: 32MS/32WS/32MD/32WD/32XD	(Germany) Mark Lamsfuß (Germany) Isabel Lohau	(Malaysia) Goh Soon Huat (Malaysia) Shevon Jemie Lai
21 March	Swiss Open (Draw): Host: Basel, Switzerland; Venue: St. Jakobshalle; Level: Super 300; Prize: $180,000; Format: 32MS/32WS/32MD/32WD/32XD	Score: 12–21, 21–18, 21–17	
21 March	Polish Open: Host: Arłamów, Poland; Venue: Sport & Entertainment Hall at Arłamów Hotel; Level: International Challenge; Prize: $15,000; Format: 32MS/32WS/32MD/32WD/32XD	(India) Kiran George	(Chinese Taipei) Lee Chia-hao
21 March	Polish Open: Host: Arłamów, Poland; Venue: Sport & Entertainment Hall at Arłamów Hotel; Level: International Challenge; Prize: $15,000; Format: 32MS/32WS/32MD/32WD/32XD	Score: 21–15, 21–14	
21 March	Polish Open: Host: Arłamów, Poland; Venue: Sport & Entertainment Hall at Arłamów Hotel; Level: International Challenge; Prize: $15,000; Format: 32MS/32WS/32MD/32WD/32XD	(India) Anupama Upadhyaya	(India) Aditi Bhatt
21 March	Polish Open: Host: Arłamów, Poland; Venue: Sport & Entertainment Hall at Arłamów Hotel; Level: International Challenge; Prize: $15,000; Format: 32MS/32WS/32MD/32WD/32XD	Score: 17–21, 21–14, 21–17	
21 March	Polish Open: Host: Arłamów, Poland; Venue: Sport & Entertainment Hall at Arłamów Hotel; Level: International Challenge; Prize: $15,000; Format: 32MS/32WS/32MD/32WD/32XD	(Denmark) Rasmus Kjær (Denmark) Frederik Søgaard	(Chinese Taipei) Su Ching-heng (Chinese Taipei) Ye Hong-wei
21 March	Polish Open: Host: Arłamów, Poland; Venue: Sport & Entertainment Hall at Arłamów Hotel; Level: International Challenge; Prize: $15,000; Format: 32MS/32WS/32MD/32WD/32XD	Score: 21–16, 17–21, 21–19	
21 March	Polish Open: Host: Arłamów, Poland; Venue: Sport & Entertainment Hall at Arłamów Hotel; Level: International Challenge; Prize: $15,000; Format: 32MS/32WS/32MD/32WD/32XD	(Hong Kong) Yeung Nga Ting (Hong Kong) Yeung Pui Lam	(Chinese Taipei) Lee Chia-hsin (Chinese Taipei) Teng Chun-hsun
21 March	Polish Open: Host: Arłamów, Poland; Venue: Sport & Entertainment Hall at Arłamów Hotel; Level: International Challenge; Prize: $15,000; Format: 32MS/32WS/32MD/32WD/32XD	Score: 21–9, 21–18	
21 March	Polish Open: Host: Arłamów, Poland; Venue: Sport & Entertainment Hall at Arłamów Hotel; Level: International Challenge; Prize: $15,000; Format: 32MS/32WS/32MD/32WD/32XD	(Chinese Taipei) Ye Hong-wei (Chinese Taipei) Lee Chia-hsin	(Poland) Paweł Śmiłowski (Poland) Wiktoria Adamek
21 March	Polish Open: Host: Arłamów, Poland; Venue: Sport & Entertainment Hall at Arłamów Hotel; Level: International Challenge; Prize: $15,000; Format: 32MS/32WS/32MD/32WD/32XD	Score: 22–20, 21–17	
21 March	Vietnam International Challenge (cancelled) (Note: This tournament, originally to be played on 22–27 March, was later cancelled due to the COVID-19 pandemic in Vietnam.): Host: Hanoi, Vietnam; Venue: Tay Ho District Stadium; Level: International Challenge; Prize: $25,000; Format: TBD		
21 March	Vietnam International Challenge (cancelled): Host: Hanoi, Vietnam; Venue: Tay Ho District Stadium; Level: International Challenge; Prize: $25,000; Format: TBD	Score:	
21 March	Vietnam International Challenge (cancelled): Host: Hanoi, Vietnam; Venue: Tay Ho District Stadium; Level: International Challenge; Prize: $25,000; Format: TBD	Score:	
21 March	Vietnam International Challenge (cancelled): Host: Hanoi, Vietnam; Venue: Tay Ho District Stadium; Level: International Challenge; Prize: $25,000; Format: TBD	Score:	
21 March	Vietnam International Challenge (cancelled): Host: Hanoi, Vietnam; Venue: Tay Ho District Stadium; Level: International Challenge; Prize: $25,000; Format: TBD	Score:	
21 March	Vietnam International Challenge (cancelled): Host: Hanoi, Vietnam; Venue: Tay Ho District Stadium; Level: International Challenge; Prize: $25,000; Format: TBD	Score:	
28 March	Orléans Masters (Draw): Host: Orléans, France; Venue: Palais des Sports; Level: Super 100; Prize: $90,000; Format: 64MS/32WS/32MD/32WD/32XD	(France) Toma Junior Popov	(India) Mithun Manjunath
28 March	Orléans Masters (Draw): Host: Orléans, France; Venue: Palais des Sports; Level: Super 100; Prize: $90,000; Format: 64MS/32WS/32MD/32WD/32XD	Score: 21–11, 21–19	
28 March	Orléans Masters (Draw): Host: Orléans, France; Venue: Palais des Sports; Level: Super 100; Prize: $90,000; Format: 64MS/32WS/32MD/32WD/32XD	(Indonesia) Putri Kusuma Wardani	(United States) Iris Wang
28 March	Orléans Masters (Draw): Host: Orléans, France; Venue: Palais des Sports; Level: Super 100; Prize: $90,000; Format: 64MS/32WS/32MD/32WD/32XD	Score: 7–21, 21–19, 21–18	
28 March	Orléans Masters (Draw): Host: Orléans, France; Venue: Palais des Sports; Level: Super 100; Prize: $90,000; Format: 64MS/32WS/32MD/32WD/32XD	(Netherlands) Ruben Jille (Netherlands) Ties van der Lecq	(Malaysia) Junaidi Arif (Malaysia) Muhammad Haikal
28 March	Orléans Masters (Draw): Host: Orléans, France; Venue: Palais des Sports; Level: Super 100; Prize: $90,000; Format: 64MS/32WS/32MD/32WD/32XD	Score: Walkover	
28 March	Orléans Masters (Draw): Host: Orléans, France; Venue: Palais des Sports; Level: Super 100; Prize: $90,000; Format: 64MS/32WS/32MD/32WD/32XD	(Bulgaria) Gabriela Stoeva (Bulgaria) Stefani Stoeva	(Germany) Stine Küspert (Germany) Emma Moszczynski
28 March	Orléans Masters (Draw): Host: Orléans, France; Venue: Palais des Sports; Level: Super 100; Prize: $90,000; Format: 64MS/32WS/32MD/32WD/32XD	Score: 21–15, 21–14	
28 March	Orléans Masters (Draw): Host: Orléans, France; Venue: Palais des Sports; Level: Super 100; Prize: $90,000; Format: 64MS/32WS/32MD/32WD/32XD	(Singapore) Terry Hee (Singapore) Tan Wei Han	(Indonesia) Rehan Naufal Kusharjanto (Indonesia) Lisa Ayu Kusumawati
28 March	Orléans Masters (Draw): Host: Orléans, France; Venue: Palais des Sports; Level: Super 100; Prize: $90,000; Format: 64MS/32WS/32MD/32WD/32XD	Score: 21–12, 16–21, 21–13	

=== April ===
Week commencing	Tournament	Champions	Runners-up
4 April	Korea Open (Draw): Host: Suncheon, South Korea; Venue: Palma Indoor Stadium; Level: Super 500; Prize: $360,000; Format: 32MS/32WS/32MD/16WD/32XD	(China) Weng Hongyang	(Indonesia) Jonatan Christie
4 April	Korea Open (Draw): Host: Suncheon, South Korea; Venue: Palma Indoor Stadium; Level: Super 500; Prize: $360,000; Format: 32MS/32WS/32MD/16WD/32XD	Score: 12–21, 21–19, 21–15	
4 April	Korea Open (Draw): Host: Suncheon, South Korea; Venue: Palma Indoor Stadium; Level: Super 500; Prize: $360,000; Format: 32MS/32WS/32MD/16WD/32XD	(South Korea) An Se-young	(Thailand) Pornpawee Chochuwong
4 April	Korea Open (Draw): Host: Suncheon, South Korea; Venue: Palma Indoor Stadium; Level: Super 500; Prize: $360,000; Format: 32MS/32WS/32MD/16WD/32XD	Score: 21–17, 21–18	
4 April	Korea Open (Draw): Host: Suncheon, South Korea; Venue: Palma Indoor Stadium; Level: Super 500; Prize: $360,000; Format: 32MS/32WS/32MD/16WD/32XD	(South Korea) Kang Min-hyuk (South Korea) Seo Seung-jae	(Indonesia) Fajar Alfian (Indonesia) Muhammad Rian Ardianto
4 April	Korea Open (Draw): Host: Suncheon, South Korea; Venue: Palma Indoor Stadium; Level: Super 500; Prize: $360,000; Format: 32MS/32WS/32MD/16WD/32XD	Score: 19–21, 21–15, 21–18	
4 April	Korea Open (Draw): Host: Suncheon, South Korea; Venue: Palma Indoor Stadium; Level: Super 500; Prize: $360,000; Format: 32MS/32WS/32MD/16WD/32XD	(South Korea) Jeong Na-eun (South Korea) Kim Hye-jeong	(Thailand) Benyapa Aimsaard (Thailand) Nuntakarn Aimsaard
4 April	Korea Open (Draw): Host: Suncheon, South Korea; Venue: Palma Indoor Stadium; Level: Super 500; Prize: $360,000; Format: 32MS/32WS/32MD/16WD/32XD	Score: 21–16, 21–12	
4 April	Korea Open (Draw): Host: Suncheon, South Korea; Venue: Palma Indoor Stadium; Level: Super 500; Prize: $360,000; Format: 32MS/32WS/32MD/16WD/32XD	(Malaysia) Tan Kian Meng (Malaysia) Lai Pei Jing	(South Korea) Ko Sung-hyun (South Korea) Eom Hye-won
4 April	Korea Open (Draw): Host: Suncheon, South Korea; Venue: Palma Indoor Stadium; Level: Super 500; Prize: $360,000; Format: 32MS/32WS/32MD/16WD/32XD	Score: 21–15, 21–18	
4 April	Osaka International (cancelled): Host: Moriguchi, Osaka, Japan; Venue: Moriguchi City Gymnasium; Level: International Challenge; Prize: $25,000; Format: 32MS/32WS/32MD/32WD/32XD		
4 April	Osaka International (cancelled): Host: Moriguchi, Osaka, Japan; Venue: Moriguchi City Gymnasium; Level: International Challenge; Prize: $25,000; Format: 32MS/32WS/32MD/32WD/32XD	Score:	
4 April	Osaka International (cancelled): Host: Moriguchi, Osaka, Japan; Venue: Moriguchi City Gymnasium; Level: International Challenge; Prize: $25,000; Format: 32MS/32WS/32MD/32WD/32XD	Score:	
4 April	Osaka International (cancelled): Host: Moriguchi, Osaka, Japan; Venue: Moriguchi City Gymnasium; Level: International Challenge; Prize: $25,000; Format: 32MS/32WS/32MD/32WD/32XD	Score:	
4 April	Osaka International (cancelled): Host: Moriguchi, Osaka, Japan; Venue: Moriguchi City Gymnasium; Level: International Challenge; Prize: $25,000; Format: 32MS/32WS/32MD/32WD/32XD	Score:	
4 April	Osaka International (cancelled): Host: Moriguchi, Osaka, Japan; Venue: Moriguchi City Gymnasium; Level: International Challenge; Prize: $25,000; Format: 32MS/32WS/32MD/32WD/32XD	Score:	
4 April	Dnipro Future Series (postponed): Host: Dnipro, Ukraine; Venue: Olympic Reserves Stadium; Level: Future Series; Prize: $2,500; Format: TBD		
4 April	Dnipro Future Series (postponed): Host: Dnipro, Ukraine; Venue: Olympic Reserves Stadium; Level: Future Series; Prize: $2,500; Format: TBD	Score:	
4 April	Dnipro Future Series (postponed): Host: Dnipro, Ukraine; Venue: Olympic Reserves Stadium; Level: Future Series; Prize: $2,500; Format: TBD	Score:	
4 April	Dnipro Future Series (postponed): Host: Dnipro, Ukraine; Venue: Olympic Reserves Stadium; Level: Future Series; Prize: $2,500; Format: TBD	Score:	
4 April	Dnipro Future Series (postponed): Host: Dnipro, Ukraine; Venue: Olympic Reserves Stadium; Level: Future Series; Prize: $2,500; Format: TBD	Score:	
4 April	Dnipro Future Series (postponed): Host: Dnipro, Ukraine; Venue: Olympic Reserves Stadium; Level: Future Series; Prize: $2,500; Format: TBD	Score:	
11 April	Korea Masters (Draw): Host: Gwangju, South Korea; Venue: Gwangju Women's University Stadium; Level: Super 300; Prize: $180,000; Format: 32MS/32WS/32MD/32WD/32XD	(South Korea) Jeon Hyeok-jin	(Japan) Kodai Naraoka
11 April	Korea Masters (Draw): Host: Gwangju, South Korea; Venue: Gwangju Women's University Stadium; Level: Super 300; Prize: $180,000; Format: 32MS/32WS/32MD/32WD/32XD	Score: 21–17, 21–16	
11 April	Korea Masters (Draw): Host: Gwangju, South Korea; Venue: Gwangju Women's University Stadium; Level: Super 300; Prize: $180,000; Format: 32MS/32WS/32MD/32WD/32XD	(China) He Bingjiao	(China) Chen Yufei
11 April	Korea Masters (Draw): Host: Gwangju, South Korea; Venue: Gwangju Women's University Stadium; Level: Super 300; Prize: $180,000; Format: 32MS/32WS/32MD/32WD/32XD	Score: 21–14, 14–21, 21–9	
11 April	Korea Masters (Draw): Host: Gwangju, South Korea; Venue: Gwangju Women's University Stadium; Level: Super 300; Prize: $180,000; Format: 32MS/32WS/32MD/32WD/32XD	(South Korea) Kim Gi-jung (South Korea) Kim Sa-rang	(China) Liu Yuchen (China) Ou Xuanyi
11 April	Korea Masters (Draw): Host: Gwangju, South Korea; Venue: Gwangju Women's University Stadium; Level: Super 300; Prize: $180,000; Format: 32MS/32WS/32MD/32WD/32XD	Score: 21–14, 21–16	
11 April	Korea Masters (Draw): Host: Gwangju, South Korea; Venue: Gwangju Women's University Stadium; Level: Super 300; Prize: $180,000; Format: 32MS/32WS/32MD/32WD/32XD	(South Korea) Kim So-yeong (South Korea) Kong Hee-yong	(South Korea) Baek Ha-na (South Korea) Lee Yu-rim
11 April	Korea Masters (Draw): Host: Gwangju, South Korea; Venue: Gwangju Women's University Stadium; Level: Super 300; Prize: $180,000; Format: 32MS/32WS/32MD/32WD/32XD	Score: 21–17, 21–12	
11 April	Korea Masters (Draw): Host: Gwangju, South Korea; Venue: Gwangju Women's University Stadium; Level: Super 300; Prize: $180,000; Format: 32MS/32WS/32MD/32WD/32XD	(China) Wang Yilyu (China) Huang Dongping	(China) Ou Xuanyi (China) Huang Yaqiong
11 April	Korea Masters (Draw): Host: Gwangju, South Korea; Venue: Gwangju Women's University Stadium; Level: Super 300; Prize: $180,000; Format: 32MS/32WS/32MD/32WD/32XD	Score: 21–17, 21–17	
11 April	Mexican International Challenge: Host: Aguascalientes City, Mexico; Venue: Gimnasio Olímpico; Level: International Challenge; Prize: $15,000; Format: 32MS/32WS/32MD/32WD/32XD	(Japan) Minoru Koga	(Brazil) Jonathan Matias
11 April	Mexican International Challenge: Host: Aguascalientes City, Mexico; Venue: Gimnasio Olímpico; Level: International Challenge; Prize: $15,000; Format: 32MS/32WS/32MD/32WD/32XD	Score: 10–21, 22–20, 21–13	
11 April	Mexican International Challenge: Host: Aguascalientes City, Mexico; Venue: Gimnasio Olímpico; Level: International Challenge; Prize: $15,000; Format: 32MS/32WS/32MD/32WD/32XD	(Japan) Riko Gunji	(Japan) Natsuki Nidaira
11 April	Mexican International Challenge: Host: Aguascalientes City, Mexico; Venue: Gimnasio Olímpico; Level: International Challenge; Prize: $15,000; Format: 32MS/32WS/32MD/32WD/32XD	Score: 21–14, 19–21, 21–14	
11 April	Mexican International Challenge: Host: Aguascalientes City, Mexico; Venue: Gimnasio Olímpico; Level: International Challenge; Prize: $15,000; Format: 32MS/32WS/32MD/32WD/32XD	(Japan) Shuntaro Mezaki (Japan) Haruya Nishida	(Germany) Jones Ralfy Jansen (Germany) Jan Colin Völker
11 April	Mexican International Challenge: Host: Aguascalientes City, Mexico; Venue: Gimnasio Olímpico; Level: International Challenge; Prize: $15,000; Format: 32MS/32WS/32MD/32WD/32XD	Score: 21–15, 21–16	
11 April	Mexican International Challenge: Host: Aguascalientes City, Mexico; Venue: Gimnasio Olímpico; Level: International Challenge; Prize: $15,000; Format: 32MS/32WS/32MD/32WD/32XD	(Japan) Rui Hirokami (Japan) Yuna Kato	(Japan) Ayako Sakuramoto (Japan) Hinata Suzuki
11 April	Mexican International Challenge: Host: Aguascalientes City, Mexico; Venue: Gimnasio Olímpico; Level: International Challenge; Prize: $15,000; Format: 32MS/32WS/32MD/32WD/32XD	Score: 15–21, 21–19, 21–17	
11 April	Mexican International Challenge: Host: Aguascalientes City, Mexico; Venue: Gimnasio Olímpico; Level: International Challenge; Prize: $15,000; Format: 32MS/32WS/32MD/32WD/32XD	(Japan) Naoki Yamada (Japan) Moe Ikeuchi	(United States) Vinson Chiu (United States) Jennie Gai
11 April	Mexican International Challenge: Host: Aguascalientes City, Mexico; Venue: Gimnasio Olímpico; Level: International Challenge; Prize: $15,000; Format: 32MS/32WS/32MD/32WD/32XD	Score: 21–15, 18–21, 21–10	
11 April	Dutch International: Host: Wateringen, Netherlands; Venue: VELO Hall; Level: International Series; Prize: $10,000; Format: 32MS/32WS/32MD/32WD/32XD	(Denmark) Magnus Johannesen	(Indonesia) Firman Abdul Kholik
11 April	Dutch International: Host: Wateringen, Netherlands; Venue: VELO Hall; Level: International Series; Prize: $10,000; Format: 32MS/32WS/32MD/32WD/32XD	Score: 21–19, 21–9	
11 April	Dutch International: Host: Wateringen, Netherlands; Venue: VELO Hall; Level: International Series; Prize: $10,000; Format: 32MS/32WS/32MD/32WD/32XD	(Malaysia) Myisha Mohd Khairul	(Malaysia) Siti Nurshuhaini
11 April	Dutch International: Host: Wateringen, Netherlands; Venue: VELO Hall; Level: International Series; Prize: $10,000; Format: 32MS/32WS/32MD/32WD/32XD	Score: 21–19, 18–21, 21–19	
11 April	Dutch International: Host: Wateringen, Netherlands; Venue: VELO Hall; Level: International Series; Prize: $10,000; Format: 32MS/32WS/32MD/32WD/32XD	(Denmark) Rasmus Kjær (Denmark) Frederik Søgaard	(England) Alex Green (England) Jonty Russ
11 April	Dutch International: Host: Wateringen, Netherlands; Venue: VELO Hall; Level: International Series; Prize: $10,000; Format: 32MS/32WS/32MD/32WD/32XD	Score: 21–9, 21–19	
11 April	Dutch International: Host: Wateringen, Netherlands; Venue: VELO Hall; Level: International Series; Prize: $10,000; Format: 32MS/32WS/32MD/32WD/32XD	(Hong Kong) Ng Tsz Yau (Hong Kong) Tsang Hiu Yan	(Hong Kong) Yeung Nga Ting (Hong Kong) Yeung Pui Lam
11 April	Dutch International: Host: Wateringen, Netherlands; Venue: VELO Hall; Level: International Series; Prize: $10,000; Format: 32MS/32WS/32MD/32WD/32XD	Score: 22–20, 14–21, 23–21	
11 April	Dutch International: Host: Wateringen, Netherlands; Venue: VELO Hall; Level: International Series; Prize: $10,000; Format: 32MS/32WS/32MD/32WD/32XD	(Hong Kong) Lee Chun Hei (Hong Kong) Ng Tsz Yau	(Denmark) Jesper Toft (Denmark) Clara Graversen
11 April	Dutch International: Host: Wateringen, Netherlands; Venue: VELO Hall; Level: International Series; Prize: $10,000; Format: 32MS/32WS/32MD/32WD/32XD	Score: 21–9, 21–14	
25 April	Badminton Asia Championships (Draw): Host: Muntinlupa, Philippines; Venue: Muntinlupa Sports Complex; Level: Continental Championships; Format: 32MS/32WS/32MD/32WD/32XD	(Malaysia) Lee Zii Jia	(Indonesia) Jonatan Christie
25 April	Badminton Asia Championships (Draw): Host: Muntinlupa, Philippines; Venue: Muntinlupa Sports Complex; Level: Continental Championships; Format: 32MS/32WS/32MD/32WD/32XD	Score: 21–17, 23–21	
25 April	Badminton Asia Championships (Draw): Host: Muntinlupa, Philippines; Venue: Muntinlupa Sports Complex; Level: Continental Championships; Format: 32MS/32WS/32MD/32WD/32XD	(China) Wang Zhiyi	(Japan) Akane Yamaguchi
25 April	Badminton Asia Championships (Draw): Host: Muntinlupa, Philippines; Venue: Muntinlupa Sports Complex; Level: Continental Championships; Format: 32MS/32WS/32MD/32WD/32XD	Score: 15–21, 21–13, 21–19	
25 April	Badminton Asia Championships (Draw): Host: Muntinlupa, Philippines; Venue: Muntinlupa Sports Complex; Level: Continental Championships; Format: 32MS/32WS/32MD/32WD/32XD	(Indonesia) Pramudya Kusumawardana (Indonesia) Yeremia Rambitan	(Malaysia) Aaron Chia (Malaysia) Soh Wooi Yik
25 April	Badminton Asia Championships (Draw): Host: Muntinlupa, Philippines; Venue: Muntinlupa Sports Complex; Level: Continental Championships; Format: 32MS/32WS/32MD/32WD/32XD	Score: 23–21, 21–10	
25 April	Badminton Asia Championships (Draw): Host: Muntinlupa, Philippines; Venue: Muntinlupa Sports Complex; Level: Continental Championships; Format: 32MS/32WS/32MD/32WD/32XD	(China) Chen Qingchen (China) Jia Yifan	(Japan) Rin Iwanaga (Japan) Kie Nakanishi
25 April	Badminton Asia Championships (Draw): Host: Muntinlupa, Philippines; Venue: Muntinlupa Sports Complex; Level: Continental Championships; Format: 32MS/32WS/32MD/32WD/32XD	Score: 21–11, 21–15	
25 April	Badminton Asia Championships (Draw): Host: Muntinlupa, Philippines; Venue: Muntinlupa Sports Complex; Level: Continental Championships; Format: 32MS/32WS/32MD/32WD/32XD	(China) Zheng Siwei (China) Huang Yaqiong	(China) Wang Yilyu (China) Huang Dongping
25 April	Badminton Asia Championships (Draw): Host: Muntinlupa, Philippines; Venue: Muntinlupa Sports Complex; Level: Continental Championships; Format: 32MS/32WS/32MD/32WD/32XD	Score: 21–17, 21–8	
25 April	European Badminton Championships (Draw): Host: Madrid, Spain; Venue: Polideportivo Municipal Gallur; Level: Continental Championships; Format: 64MS/64WS/32MD/32WD/32XD	(Denmark) Viktor Axelsen	(Denmark) Anders Antonsen
25 April	European Badminton Championships (Draw): Host: Madrid, Spain; Venue: Polideportivo Municipal Gallur; Level: Continental Championships; Format: 64MS/64WS/32MD/32WD/32XD	Score: 21–17, 21–15	
25 April	European Badminton Championships (Draw): Host: Madrid, Spain; Venue: Polideportivo Municipal Gallur; Level: Continental Championships; Format: 64MS/64WS/32MD/32WD/32XD	(Spain) Carolina Marín	(Scotland) Kirsty Gilmour
25 April	European Badminton Championships (Draw): Host: Madrid, Spain; Venue: Polideportivo Municipal Gallur; Level: Continental Championships; Format: 64MS/64WS/32MD/32WD/32XD	Score: 21–10, 21–12	
25 April	European Badminton Championships (Draw): Host: Madrid, Spain; Venue: Polideportivo Municipal Gallur; Level: Continental Championships; Format: 64MS/64WS/32MD/32WD/32XD	(Germany) Mark Lamsfuß (Germany) Marvin Seidel	(Scotland) Alexander Dunn (Scotland) Adam Hall
25 April	European Badminton Championships (Draw): Host: Madrid, Spain; Venue: Polideportivo Municipal Gallur; Level: Continental Championships; Format: 64MS/64WS/32MD/32WD/32XD	Score: 21–17, 21–16	
25 April	European Badminton Championships (Draw): Host: Madrid, Spain; Venue: Polideportivo Municipal Gallur; Level: Continental Championships; Format: 64MS/64WS/32MD/32WD/32XD	(Bulgaria) Gabriela Stoeva (Bulgaria) Stefani Stoeva	(Germany) Linda Efler (Germany) Isabel Lohau
25 April	European Badminton Championships (Draw): Host: Madrid, Spain; Venue: Polideportivo Municipal Gallur; Level: Continental Championships; Format: 64MS/64WS/32MD/32WD/32XD	Score: 21–14, 21–10	
25 April	European Badminton Championships (Draw): Host: Madrid, Spain; Venue: Polideportivo Municipal Gallur; Level: Continental Championships; Format: 64MS/64WS/32MD/32WD/32XD	(Germany) Mark Lamsfuß (Germany) Isabel Lohau	(France) Thom Gicquel (France) Delphine Delrue
25 April	European Badminton Championships (Draw): Host: Madrid, Spain; Venue: Polideportivo Municipal Gallur; Level: Continental Championships; Format: 64MS/64WS/32MD/32WD/32XD	Score: 16–21, 22–20, 21–16	
25 April	Pan American Badminton Championships (Draw): Host: San Salvador, El Salvador; Venue: Palacio Nacional de los Deportes Carlos "El Famoso" Hernandez; Level: Continental Championships; Format: 64MS/64WS/32MD/32WD/64XD	(Guatemala) Kevin Cordón	(Canada) Brian Yang
25 April	Pan American Badminton Championships (Draw): Host: San Salvador, El Salvador; Venue: Palacio Nacional de los Deportes Carlos "El Famoso" Hernandez; Level: Continental Championships; Format: 64MS/64WS/32MD/32WD/64XD	Score: 21–17, 21–14	
25 April	Pan American Badminton Championships (Draw): Host: San Salvador, El Salvador; Venue: Palacio Nacional de los Deportes Carlos "El Famoso" Hernandez; Level: Continental Championships; Format: 64MS/64WS/32MD/32WD/64XD	(Canada) Michelle Li	(United States) Beiwen Zhang
25 April	Pan American Badminton Championships (Draw): Host: San Salvador, El Salvador; Venue: Palacio Nacional de los Deportes Carlos "El Famoso" Hernandez; Level: Continental Championships; Format: 64MS/64WS/32MD/32WD/64XD	Score: 21–18, 16–21, 25–23	
25 April	Pan American Badminton Championships (Draw): Host: San Salvador, El Salvador; Venue: Palacio Nacional de los Deportes Carlos "El Famoso" Hernandez; Level: Continental Championships; Format: 64MS/64WS/32MD/32WD/64XD	(Mexico) Job Castillo (Mexico) Luis Montoya	(United States) Vinson Chiu (United States) Joshua Yuan
25 April	Pan American Badminton Championships (Draw): Host: San Salvador, El Salvador; Venue: Palacio Nacional de los Deportes Carlos "El Famoso" Hernandez; Level: Continental Championships; Format: 64MS/64WS/32MD/32WD/64XD	Score: 22–20, 11–8 retired	
25 April	Pan American Badminton Championships (Draw): Host: San Salvador, El Salvador; Venue: Palacio Nacional de los Deportes Carlos "El Famoso" Hernandez; Level: Continental Championships; Format: 64MS/64WS/32MD/32WD/64XD	(Canada) Rachel Honderich (Canada) Kristen Tsai	(Canada) Catherine Choi (Canada) Josephine Wu
25 April	Pan American Badminton Championships (Draw): Host: San Salvador, El Salvador; Venue: Palacio Nacional de los Deportes Carlos "El Famoso" Hernandez; Level: Continental Championships; Format: 64MS/64WS/32MD/32WD/64XD	Score: 21–17, 21–18	
25 April	Pan American Badminton Championships (Draw): Host: San Salvador, El Salvador; Venue: Palacio Nacional de los Deportes Carlos "El Famoso" Hernandez; Level: Continental Championships; Format: 64MS/64WS/32MD/32WD/64XD	(Canada) Ty Alexander Lindeman (Canada) Josephine Wu	(Guatemala) Jonathan Solís (Guatemala) Diana Corleto
25 April	Pan American Badminton Championships (Draw): Host: San Salvador, El Salvador; Venue: Palacio Nacional de los Deportes Carlos "El Famoso" Hernandez; Level: Continental Championships; Format: 64MS/64WS/32MD/32WD/64XD	Score: 21–12, 21–11	
25 April	Oceania Badminton Championships (Draw): Host: Melbourne, Australia; Venue: Melbourne Sports & Aquatic Centre; Level: Continental Championships; Format: 64MS/32WS/32MD/16WD/32XD	(New Zealand) Edward Lau	(Australia) Nathan Tang
25 April	Oceania Badminton Championships (Draw): Host: Melbourne, Australia; Venue: Melbourne Sports & Aquatic Centre; Level: Continental Championships; Format: 64MS/32WS/32MD/16WD/32XD	Score: 21–18, 21–10	
25 April	Oceania Badminton Championships (Draw): Host: Melbourne, Australia; Venue: Melbourne Sports & Aquatic Centre; Level: Continental Championships; Format: 64MS/32WS/32MD/16WD/32XD	(Australia) Chen Hsuan-yu	(Australia) Louisa Ma
25 April	Oceania Badminton Championships (Draw): Host: Melbourne, Australia; Venue: Melbourne Sports & Aquatic Centre; Level: Continental Championships; Format: 64MS/32WS/32MD/16WD/32XD	Score: 21–17, 21–18	
25 April	Oceania Badminton Championships (Draw): Host: Melbourne, Australia; Venue: Melbourne Sports & Aquatic Centre; Level: Continental Championships; Format: 64MS/32WS/32MD/16WD/32XD	(New Zealand) Abhinav Manota (New Zealand) Jack Wang	(Australia) Kenneth Choo (Australia) Lim Ming Chuen
25 April	Oceania Badminton Championships (Draw): Host: Melbourne, Australia; Venue: Melbourne Sports & Aquatic Centre; Level: Continental Championships; Format: 64MS/32WS/32MD/16WD/32XD	Score: 21–14, 23–21	
25 April	Oceania Badminton Championships (Draw): Host: Melbourne, Australia; Venue: Melbourne Sports & Aquatic Centre; Level: Continental Championships; Format: 64MS/32WS/32MD/16WD/32XD	(Australia) Joyce Choong (Australia) Sylvina Kurniawan	(Australia) Kaitlyn Ea (Australia) Gronya Somerville
25 April	Oceania Badminton Championships (Draw): Host: Melbourne, Australia; Venue: Melbourne Sports & Aquatic Centre; Level: Continental Championships; Format: 64MS/32WS/32MD/16WD/32XD	Score: 21–19, 21–15	
25 April	Oceania Badminton Championships (Draw): Host: Melbourne, Australia; Venue: Melbourne Sports & Aquatic Centre; Level: Continental Championships; Format: 64MS/32WS/32MD/16WD/32XD	(Australia) Kenneth Choo (Australia) Gronya Somerville	(New Zealand) Oliver Leydon-Davis (New Zealand) Anona Pak
25 April	Oceania Badminton Championships (Draw): Host: Melbourne, Australia; Venue: Melbourne Sports & Aquatic Centre; Level: Continental Championships; Format: 64MS/32WS/32MD/16WD/32XD	Score: 21–18, 19–21, 21–12	

=== May ===
Week commencing	Tournament	Champions	Runners-up
2 May	Luxembourg Open: Host: Luxembourg City, Luxembourg; Venue: Centre National Sportif et Culturel d'Coque; Level: International Series; Prize: $5,000; Format: 32MS/32WS/32MD/32WD/32XD	(Denmark) Mads Christophersen	(Denmark) Magnus Johannesen
2 May	Luxembourg Open: Host: Luxembourg City, Luxembourg; Venue: Centre National Sportif et Culturel d'Coque; Level: International Series; Prize: $5,000; Format: 32MS/32WS/32MD/32WD/32XD	Score: 14–21, 21–15, 21–13	
2 May	Luxembourg Open: Host: Luxembourg City, Luxembourg; Venue: Centre National Sportif et Culturel d'Coque; Level: International Series; Prize: $5,000; Format: 32MS/32WS/32MD/32WD/32XD	(Indonesia) Chiara Marvella Handoyo	(Indonesia) Aura Ihza Aulia
2 May	Luxembourg Open: Host: Luxembourg City, Luxembourg; Venue: Centre National Sportif et Culturel d'Coque; Level: International Series; Prize: $5,000; Format: 32MS/32WS/32MD/32WD/32XD	Score: 21–9, 21–9	
2 May	Luxembourg Open: Host: Luxembourg City, Luxembourg; Venue: Centre National Sportif et Culturel d'Coque; Level: International Series; Prize: $5,000; Format: 32MS/32WS/32MD/32WD/32XD	(Denmark) Andreas Søndergaard (Denmark) Jesper Toft	(Indonesia) Putra Erwiansyah (Indonesia) Patra Harapan Rindorindo
2 May	Luxembourg Open: Host: Luxembourg City, Luxembourg; Venue: Centre National Sportif et Culturel d'Coque; Level: International Series; Prize: $5,000; Format: 32MS/32WS/32MD/32WD/32XD	Score: 21–15, 23–21	
2 May	Luxembourg Open: Host: Luxembourg City, Luxembourg; Venue: Centre National Sportif et Culturel d'Coque; Level: International Series; Prize: $5,000; Format: 32MS/32WS/32MD/32WD/32XD	(England) Abbygael Harris (England) Hope Warner	(Indonesia) Titis Maulida Rahma (Indonesia) Bernadine Anindiya Wardana
2 May	Luxembourg Open: Host: Luxembourg City, Luxembourg; Venue: Centre National Sportif et Culturel d'Coque; Level: International Series; Prize: $5,000; Format: 32MS/32WS/32MD/32WD/32XD	Score: 16–21, 21–16, 22–20	
2 May	Luxembourg Open: Host: Luxembourg City, Luxembourg; Venue: Centre National Sportif et Culturel d'Coque; Level: International Series; Prize: $5,000; Format: 32MS/32WS/32MD/32WD/32XD	(France) Lucas Corvée (France) Sharone Bauer	(Indonesia) Verrell Yustin Mulia (Indonesia) Bernadine Anindiya Wardana
2 May	Luxembourg Open: Host: Luxembourg City, Luxembourg; Venue: Centre National Sportif et Culturel d'Coque; Level: International Series; Prize: $5,000; Format: 32MS/32WS/32MD/32WD/32XD	Score: 21–18, 17–21, 22–20	
9 May	Thomas Cup (Draw): Host: Pak Kret, Thailand; Venue: Impact Arena; Level: World Team Championships; Format: 16MT	India	Indonesia
9 May	Thomas Cup (Draw): Host: Pak Kret, Thailand; Venue: Impact Arena; Level: World Team Championships; Format: 16MT	Lakshya Sen	Anthony Sinisuka Ginting
9 May	Thomas Cup (Draw): Host: Pak Kret, Thailand; Venue: Impact Arena; Level: World Team Championships; Format: 16MT	Satwiksairaj Rankireddy; Chirag Shetty	Mohammad Ahsan; Kevin Sanjaya Sukamuljo
9 May	Thomas Cup (Draw): Host: Pak Kret, Thailand; Venue: Impact Arena; Level: World Team Championships; Format: 16MT	Srikanth Kidambi	Jonatan Christie
9 May	Thomas Cup (Draw): Host: Pak Kret, Thailand; Venue: Impact Arena; Level: World Team Championships; Format: 16MT	Arjun M. R. Dhruv Kapila	Fajar Alfian; Muhammad Rian Ardianto
9 May	Thomas Cup (Draw): Host: Pak Kret, Thailand; Venue: Impact Arena; Level: World Team Championships; Format: 16MT	Prannoy H. S.	Shesar Hiren Rhustavito
9 May	Thomas Cup (Draw): Host: Pak Kret, Thailand; Venue: Impact Arena; Level: World Team Championships; Format: 16MT	Score: 3–0	
9 May	Uber Cup (Draw): Host: Pak Kret, Thailand; Venue: Impact Arena; Level: World Team Championships; Format: 16WT	South Korea	China
9 May	Uber Cup (Draw): Host: Pak Kret, Thailand; Venue: Impact Arena; Level: World Team Championships; Format: 16WT	An Se-young	Chen Yufei
9 May	Uber Cup (Draw): Host: Pak Kret, Thailand; Venue: Impact Arena; Level: World Team Championships; Format: 16WT	Lee So-hee; Shin Seung-chan	Chen Qingchen; Jia Yifan
9 May	Uber Cup (Draw): Host: Pak Kret, Thailand; Venue: Impact Arena; Level: World Team Championships; Format: 16WT	Kim Ga-eun	He Bingjiao
9 May	Uber Cup (Draw): Host: Pak Kret, Thailand; Venue: Impact Arena; Level: World Team Championships; Format: 16WT	Kim Hye-jeong; Kong Hee-yong	Huang Dongping; Li Wenmei
9 May	Uber Cup (Draw): Host: Pak Kret, Thailand; Venue: Impact Arena; Level: World Team Championships; Format: 16WT	Sim Yu-jin	Wang Zhiyi
9 May	Uber Cup (Draw): Host: Pak Kret, Thailand; Venue: Impact Arena; Level: World Team Championships; Format: 16WT	Score: 3–2	
16 May	Thailand Open (Draw): Host: Pak Kret, Thailand; Venue: Impact Arena; Level: Super 500; Prize: $360,000; Format: 32MS/32WS/32MD/32WD/32XD	(Malaysia) Lee Zii Jia	(China) Li Shifeng
16 May	Thailand Open (Draw): Host: Pak Kret, Thailand; Venue: Impact Arena; Level: Super 500; Prize: $360,000; Format: 32MS/32WS/32MD/32WD/32XD	Score: 17–21, 21–11, 23–21	
16 May	Thailand Open (Draw): Host: Pak Kret, Thailand; Venue: Impact Arena; Level: Super 500; Prize: $360,000; Format: 32MS/32WS/32MD/32WD/32XD	(Chinese Taipei) Tai Tzu-ying	(China) Chen Yufei
16 May	Thailand Open (Draw): Host: Pak Kret, Thailand; Venue: Impact Arena; Level: Super 500; Prize: $360,000; Format: 32MS/32WS/32MD/32WD/32XD	Score: 21–15, 17–21, 21–12	
16 May	Thailand Open (Draw): Host: Pak Kret, Thailand; Venue: Impact Arena; Level: Super 500; Prize: $360,000; Format: 32MS/32WS/32MD/32WD/32XD	(Japan) Takuro Hoki (Japan) Yugo Kobayashi	(Indonesia) Fajar Alfian (Indonesia) Muhammad Rian Ardianto
16 May	Thailand Open (Draw): Host: Pak Kret, Thailand; Venue: Impact Arena; Level: Super 500; Prize: $360,000; Format: 32MS/32WS/32MD/32WD/32XD	Score: 13–4 retired	
16 May	Thailand Open (Draw): Host: Pak Kret, Thailand; Venue: Impact Arena; Level: Super 500; Prize: $360,000; Format: 32MS/32WS/32MD/32WD/32XD	(Japan) Nami Matsuyama (Japan) Chiharu Shida	(Japan) Mayu Matsumoto (Japan) Wakana Nagahara
16 May	Thailand Open (Draw): Host: Pak Kret, Thailand; Venue: Impact Arena; Level: Super 500; Prize: $360,000; Format: 32MS/32WS/32MD/32WD/32XD	Score: 17–21, 21–15, 26–24	
16 May	Thailand Open (Draw): Host: Pak Kret, Thailand; Venue: Impact Arena; Level: Super 500; Prize: $360,000; Format: 32MS/32WS/32MD/32WD/32XD	(China) Zheng Siwei (China) Huang Yaqiong	(Thailand) Dechapol Puavaranukroh (Thailand) Sapsiree Taerattanachai
16 May	Thailand Open (Draw): Host: Pak Kret, Thailand; Venue: Impact Arena; Level: Super 500; Prize: $360,000; Format: 32MS/32WS/32MD/32WD/32XD	Score: 21–12, 18–21, 21–14	
16 May	Slovenian International: Host: Maribor, Slovenia; Venue: Dras center; Level: International Series; Prize: $5,000; Format: 64MS/32WS/32MD/32WD/32XD	(Austria) Collins Valentine Filimon	(Chinese Taipei) Lin Kuan-ting
16 May	Slovenian International: Host: Maribor, Slovenia; Venue: Dras center; Level: International Series; Prize: $5,000; Format: 64MS/32WS/32MD/32WD/32XD	Score: 21–17, 23–25, 21–12	
16 May	Slovenian International: Host: Maribor, Slovenia; Venue: Dras center; Level: International Series; Prize: $5,000; Format: 64MS/32WS/32MD/32WD/32XD	(Chinese Taipei) Lin Hsiang-ti	(India) Smit Toshniwal
16 May	Slovenian International: Host: Maribor, Slovenia; Venue: Dras center; Level: International Series; Prize: $5,000; Format: 64MS/32WS/32MD/32WD/32XD	Score: 21–15, 21–14	
16 May	Slovenian International: Host: Maribor, Slovenia; Venue: Dras center; Level: International Series; Prize: $5,000; Format: 64MS/32WS/32MD/32WD/32XD	(Chinese Taipei) Wei Chun-wei (Chinese Taipei) Wu Guan-xun	(Chinese Taipei) Lin Yu-chieh (Chinese Taipei) Su Li-wei
16 May	Slovenian International: Host: Maribor, Slovenia; Venue: Dras center; Level: International Series; Prize: $5,000; Format: 64MS/32WS/32MD/32WD/32XD	Score: 21–16, 19–21, 21–9	
16 May	Slovenian International: Host: Maribor, Slovenia; Venue: Dras center; Level: International Series; Prize: $5,000; Format: 64MS/32WS/32MD/32WD/32XD	(Indonesia) Meilysa Trias Puspita Sari (Indonesia) Rachel Allessya Rose	(Italy) Martina Corsini (Italy) Judith Mair
16 May	Slovenian International: Host: Maribor, Slovenia; Venue: Dras center; Level: International Series; Prize: $5,000; Format: 64MS/32WS/32MD/32WD/32XD	Score: 21–18, 21–14	
16 May	Slovenian International: Host: Maribor, Slovenia; Venue: Dras center; Level: International Series; Prize: $5,000; Format: 64MS/32WS/32MD/32WD/32XD	(Denmark) Kristian Kræmer (Denmark) Amalie Cecilie Kudsk	(Indonesia) Rafli Ramanda (Indonesia) Az-Azahra Putri Dania
16 May	Slovenian International: Host: Maribor, Slovenia; Venue: Dras center; Level: International Series; Prize: $5,000; Format: 64MS/32WS/32MD/32WD/32XD	Score: 21–14, 21–15	
16 May	2021 Southeast Asian Games – Men's team (Draw): Host: Bắc Giang, Vietnam; Venue: Bac Giang Gymnasium; Level: Multisport; Format: 8 MT	Thailand	Malaysia
16 May	2021 Southeast Asian Games – Men's team (Draw): Host: Bắc Giang, Vietnam; Venue: Bac Giang Gymnasium; Level: Multisport; Format: 8 MT	Kunlavut Vitidsarn	Kok Jing Hong
16 May	2021 Southeast Asian Games – Men's team (Draw): Host: Bắc Giang, Vietnam; Venue: Bac Giang Gymnasium; Level: Multisport; Format: 8 MT	Chaloempon Charoenkitamorn; Nanthakarn Yordphaisong	Man Wei Chong; Tee Kai Wun
16 May	2021 Southeast Asian Games – Men's team (Draw): Host: Bắc Giang, Vietnam; Venue: Bac Giang Gymnasium; Level: Multisport; Format: 8 MT	Khosit Phetpradab	Lee Shun Yang
16 May	2021 Southeast Asian Games – Men's team (Draw): Host: Bắc Giang, Vietnam; Venue: Bac Giang Gymnasium; Level: Multisport; Format: 8 MT	Peeratchai Sukphun; Pakkapon Teeraratsakul	Chen Tang Jie; Muhammad Haikal
16 May	2021 Southeast Asian Games – Men's team (Draw): Host: Bắc Giang, Vietnam; Venue: Bac Giang Gymnasium; Level: Multisport; Format: 8 MT	Panitchaphon Teeraratsakul	Shahyar Shaqeem
16 May	2021 Southeast Asian Games – Men's team (Draw): Host: Bắc Giang, Vietnam; Venue: Bac Giang Gymnasium; Level: Multisport; Format: 8 MT	Score: 3–0	
16 May	2021 Southeast Asian Games – Women's team (Draw): Host: Bắc Giang, Vietnam; Venue: Bac Giang Gymnasium; Level: Multisport; Format: 6 WT	Thailand	Indonesia
16 May	2021 Southeast Asian Games – Women's team (Draw): Host: Bắc Giang, Vietnam; Venue: Bac Giang Gymnasium; Level: Multisport; Format: 6 WT	Pornpawee Chochuwong	Putri Kusuma Wardani
16 May	2021 Southeast Asian Games – Women's team (Draw): Host: Bắc Giang, Vietnam; Venue: Bac Giang Gymnasium; Level: Multisport; Format: 6 WT	Jongkolphan Kititharakul; Rawinda Prajongjai	Apriyani Rahayu; Siti Fadia Silva Ramadhanti
16 May	2021 Southeast Asian Games – Women's team (Draw): Host: Bắc Giang, Vietnam; Venue: Bac Giang Gymnasium; Level: Multisport; Format: 6 WT	Supanida Katethong	Stephanie Widjaja
16 May	2021 Southeast Asian Games – Women's team (Draw): Host: Bắc Giang, Vietnam; Venue: Bac Giang Gymnasium; Level: Multisport; Format: 6 WT	Benyapa Aimsaard; Nuntakarn Aimsaard	Febby Valencia Dwijayanti Gani; Ribka Sugiarto
16 May	2021 Southeast Asian Games – Women's team (Draw): Host: Bắc Giang, Vietnam; Venue: Bac Giang Gymnasium; Level: Multisport; Format: 6 WT	Pitchamon Opatniput	Saifi Rizka Nurhidayah
16 May	2021 Southeast Asian Games – Women's team (Draw): Host: Bắc Giang, Vietnam; Venue: Bac Giang Gymnasium; Level: Multisport; Format: 6 WT	Score: 3–0	
16 May	2021 Southeast Asian Games – Individual event (Draw): Host: Bắc Giang, Vietnam; Venue: Bac Giang Gymnasium; Level: Multisport; Format: 16MS/16WS/16MD/16WD/16XD	(Thailand) Kunlavut Vitidsarn	(Singapore) Loh Kean Yew
16 May	2021 Southeast Asian Games – Individual event (Draw): Host: Bắc Giang, Vietnam; Venue: Bac Giang Gymnasium; Level: Multisport; Format: 16MS/16WS/16MD/16WD/16XD	Score: 21–13, 21–13	
16 May	2021 Southeast Asian Games – Individual event (Draw): Host: Bắc Giang, Vietnam; Venue: Bac Giang Gymnasium; Level: Multisport; Format: 16MS/16WS/16MD/16WD/16XD	(Thailand) Pornpawee Chochuwong	(Thailand) Phittayaporn Chaiwan
16 May	2021 Southeast Asian Games – Individual event (Draw): Host: Bắc Giang, Vietnam; Venue: Bac Giang Gymnasium; Level: Multisport; Format: 16MS/16WS/16MD/16WD/16XD	Score: 21–14, 21–16	
16 May	2021 Southeast Asian Games – Individual event (Draw): Host: Bắc Giang, Vietnam; Venue: Bac Giang Gymnasium; Level: Multisport; Format: 16MS/16WS/16MD/16WD/16XD	(Indonesia) Leo Rolly Carnando (Indonesia) Daniel Marthin	(Indonesia) Pramudya Kusumawardana (Indonesia) Yeremia Rambitan
16 May	2021 Southeast Asian Games – Individual event (Draw): Host: Bắc Giang, Vietnam; Venue: Bac Giang Gymnasium; Level: Multisport; Format: 16MS/16WS/16MD/16WD/16XD	Score: 21–17, 21–19	
16 May	2021 Southeast Asian Games – Individual event (Draw): Host: Bắc Giang, Vietnam; Venue: Bac Giang Gymnasium; Level: Multisport; Format: 16MS/16WS/16MD/16WD/16XD	(Indonesia) Apriyani Rahayu (Indonesia) Siti Fadia Silva Ramadhanti	(Thailand) Benyapa Aimsaard (Thailand) Nuntakarn Aimsaard
16 May	2021 Southeast Asian Games – Individual event (Draw): Host: Bắc Giang, Vietnam; Venue: Bac Giang Gymnasium; Level: Multisport; Format: 16MS/16WS/16MD/16WD/16XD	Score: 21–17, 21–14	
16 May	2021 Southeast Asian Games – Individual event (Draw): Host: Bắc Giang, Vietnam; Venue: Bac Giang Gymnasium; Level: Multisport; Format: 16MS/16WS/16MD/16WD/16XD	(Malaysia) Chen Tang Jie (Malaysia) Peck Yen Wei	(Malaysia) Hoo Pang Ron (Malaysia) Cheah Yee See
16 May	2021 Southeast Asian Games – Individual event (Draw): Host: Bắc Giang, Vietnam; Venue: Bac Giang Gymnasium; Level: Multisport; Format: 16MS/16WS/16MD/16WD/16XD	Score: 15–21, 21–19, 21–13	
23 May	Austrian Open: Host: Graz, Austria; Venue: Raiffeisen Sportpark; Level: International Series; Prize: $5,000; Format: 32MS/32WS/32MD/32WD/32XD	(Malaysia) Yeoh Seng Zoe	(Denmark) Magnus Johannesen
23 May	Austrian Open: Host: Graz, Austria; Venue: Raiffeisen Sportpark; Level: International Series; Prize: $5,000; Format: 32MS/32WS/32MD/32WD/32XD	Score: 21–14, 21–15	
23 May	Austrian Open: Host: Graz, Austria; Venue: Raiffeisen Sportpark; Level: International Series; Prize: $5,000; Format: 32MS/32WS/32MD/32WD/32XD	(Chinese Taipei) Hsu Wen-chi	(Chinese Taipei) Sung Shuo-yun
23 May	Austrian Open: Host: Graz, Austria; Venue: Raiffeisen Sportpark; Level: International Series; Prize: $5,000; Format: 32MS/32WS/32MD/32WD/32XD	Score: 16–21, 21–19, 21–16	
23 May	Austrian Open: Host: Graz, Austria; Venue: Raiffeisen Sportpark; Level: International Series; Prize: $5,000; Format: 32MS/32WS/32MD/32WD/32XD	(Chinese Taipei) Lin Yu-chieh (Chinese Taipei) Su Li-wei	(Denmark) William Kryger Boe (Denmark) Christian Faust Kjaer
23 May	Austrian Open: Host: Graz, Austria; Venue: Raiffeisen Sportpark; Level: International Series; Prize: $5,000; Format: 32MS/32WS/32MD/32WD/32XD	Score: 21–18, 21–17	
23 May	Austrian Open: Host: Graz, Austria; Venue: Raiffeisen Sportpark; Level: International Series; Prize: $5,000; Format: 32MS/32WS/32MD/32WD/32XD	(Chinese Taipei) Lee Chia-hsin (Chinese Taipei) Teng Chun-hsun	(Denmark) Julie Finne-Ipsen (Denmark) Mai Surrow
23 May	Austrian Open: Host: Graz, Austria; Venue: Raiffeisen Sportpark; Level: International Series; Prize: $5,000; Format: 32MS/32WS/32MD/32WD/32XD	Score: 21–19, 15–21, 21–10	
23 May	Austrian Open: Host: Graz, Austria; Venue: Raiffeisen Sportpark; Level: International Series; Prize: $5,000; Format: 32MS/32WS/32MD/32WD/32XD	(Chinese Taipei) Ye Hong-wei (Chinese Taipei) Lee Chia-hsin	(Chinese Taipei) Su Li-wei (Chinese Taipei) Chang Ching-hui
23 May	Austrian Open: Host: Graz, Austria; Venue: Raiffeisen Sportpark; Level: International Series; Prize: $5,000; Format: 32MS/32WS/32MD/32WD/32XD	Score: 21–16, 23–21	
30 May	Italian International: Host: Milan, Italy; Venue: PalaBadminton; Level: International Challenge; Prize: $15,000; Format: 32MS/32WS/32MD/32WD/32XD	(Indonesia) Christian Adinata	(Denmark) Magnus Johannesen
30 May	Italian International: Host: Milan, Italy; Venue: PalaBadminton; Level: International Challenge; Prize: $15,000; Format: 32MS/32WS/32MD/32WD/32XD	Score: 21–16, 21–15	
30 May	Italian International: Host: Milan, Italy; Venue: PalaBadminton; Level: International Challenge; Prize: $15,000; Format: 32MS/32WS/32MD/32WD/32XD	(Chinese Taipei) Hsu Wen-chi	(India) Malvika Bansod
30 May	Italian International: Host: Milan, Italy; Venue: PalaBadminton; Level: International Challenge; Prize: $15,000; Format: 32MS/32WS/32MD/32WD/32XD	Score: 21–9, 21–11	
30 May	Italian International: Host: Milan, Italy; Venue: PalaBadminton; Level: International Challenge; Prize: $15,000; Format: 32MS/32WS/32MD/32WD/32XD	(South Korea) Kim Jae-hwan (South Korea) Yoon Dae-il	(Chinese Taipei) Su Ching-heng (Chinese Taipei) Ye Hong-wei
30 May	Italian International: Host: Milan, Italy; Venue: PalaBadminton; Level: International Challenge; Prize: $15,000; Format: 32MS/32WS/32MD/32WD/32XD	Score: 21–14, 21–19	
30 May	Italian International: Host: Milan, Italy; Venue: PalaBadminton; Level: International Challenge; Prize: $15,000; Format: 32MS/32WS/32MD/32WD/32XD	(Chinese Taipei) Hsu Ya-ching (Chinese Taipei) Lin Wan-ching	(Singapore) Jin Yujia (Singapore) Crystal Wong
30 May	Italian International: Host: Milan, Italy; Venue: PalaBadminton; Level: International Challenge; Prize: $15,000; Format: 32MS/32WS/32MD/32WD/32XD	Score: 21–8, 21–8	
30 May	Italian International: Host: Milan, Italy; Venue: PalaBadminton; Level: International Challenge; Prize: $15,000; Format: 32MS/32WS/32MD/32WD/32XD	(Indonesia) Zachariah Josiahno Sumanti (Indonesia) Hediana Julimarbela	(Thailand) Ruttanapak Oupthong (Thailand) Chasinee Korepap
30 May	Italian International: Host: Milan, Italy; Venue: PalaBadminton; Level: International Challenge; Prize: $15,000; Format: 32MS/32WS/32MD/32WD/32XD	Score: 22–20, 21–9	

=== June ===
Week commencing	Tournament	Champions	Runners-up
6 June	Indonesia Masters (Draw): Host: Jakarta, Indonesia; Venue: Istora Gelora Bung Karno; Level: Super 500; Prize: $360,000; Format: 32MS/32WS/32MD/32WD/32XD	(Denmark) Viktor Axelsen	(Chinese Taipei) Chou Tien-chen
6 June	Indonesia Masters (Draw): Host: Jakarta, Indonesia; Venue: Istora Gelora Bung Karno; Level: Super 500; Prize: $360,000; Format: 32MS/32WS/32MD/32WD/32XD	Score: 21–10, 21–12	
6 June	Indonesia Masters (Draw): Host: Jakarta, Indonesia; Venue: Istora Gelora Bung Karno; Level: Super 500; Prize: $360,000; Format: 32MS/32WS/32MD/32WD/32XD	(China) Chen Yufei	(Thailand) Ratchanok Intanon
6 June	Indonesia Masters (Draw): Host: Jakarta, Indonesia; Venue: Istora Gelora Bung Karno; Level: Super 500; Prize: $360,000; Format: 32MS/32WS/32MD/32WD/32XD	Score: 21–16, 18–21, 21–15	
6 June	Indonesia Masters (Draw): Host: Jakarta, Indonesia; Venue: Istora Gelora Bung Karno; Level: Super 500; Prize: $360,000; Format: 32MS/32WS/32MD/32WD/32XD	(Indonesia) Fajar Alfian (Indonesia) Muhammad Rian Ardianto	(China) Liang Weikeng (China) Wang Chang
6 June	Indonesia Masters (Draw): Host: Jakarta, Indonesia; Venue: Istora Gelora Bung Karno; Level: Super 500; Prize: $360,000; Format: 32MS/32WS/32MD/32WD/32XD	Score: 21–10, 21–17	
6 June	Indonesia Masters (Draw): Host: Jakarta, Indonesia; Venue: Istora Gelora Bung Karno; Level: Super 500; Prize: $360,000; Format: 32MS/32WS/32MD/32WD/32XD	(China) Chen Qingchen (China) Jia Yifan	(Indonesia) Apriyani Rahayu (Indonesia) Siti Fadia Silva Ramadhanti
6 June	Indonesia Masters (Draw): Host: Jakarta, Indonesia; Venue: Istora Gelora Bung Karno; Level: Super 500; Prize: $360,000; Format: 32MS/32WS/32MD/32WD/32XD	Score: 21–18, 21–12	
6 June	Indonesia Masters (Draw): Host: Jakarta, Indonesia; Venue: Istora Gelora Bung Karno; Level: Super 500; Prize: $360,000; Format: 32MS/32WS/32MD/32WD/32XD	(China) Zheng Siwei (China) Huang Yaqiong	(France) Thom Gicquel (France) Delphine Delrue
6 June	Indonesia Masters (Draw): Host: Jakarta, Indonesia; Venue: Istora Gelora Bung Karno; Level: Super 500; Prize: $360,000; Format: 32MS/32WS/32MD/32WD/32XD	Score: 21–13, 21–14	
6 June	Denmark Masters: Host: Hillerød, Denmark; Venue: Royal Stage; Level: International Challenge; Prize: $25,000; Format: 32MS/32WS/32MD/32WD/32XD	(Chinese Taipei) Lu Chia-hung	(India) Kiran George
6 June	Denmark Masters: Host: Hillerød, Denmark; Venue: Royal Stage; Level: International Challenge; Prize: $25,000; Format: 32MS/32WS/32MD/32WD/32XD	Score: 21–18, 21–11	
6 June	Denmark Masters: Host: Hillerød, Denmark; Venue: Royal Stage; Level: International Challenge; Prize: $25,000; Format: 32MS/32WS/32MD/32WD/32XD	(Thailand) Pitchamon Opatniput	(Chinese Taipei) Sung Shuo-yun
6 June	Denmark Masters: Host: Hillerød, Denmark; Venue: Royal Stage; Level: International Challenge; Prize: $25,000; Format: 32MS/32WS/32MD/32WD/32XD	Score: 21–16, 15–21, 21–16	
6 June	Denmark Masters: Host: Hillerød, Denmark; Venue: Royal Stage; Level: International Challenge; Prize: $25,000; Format: 32MS/32WS/32MD/32WD/32XD	(South Korea) Jin Yong (South Korea) Na Sung-seung	(Chinese Taipei) Chiu Hsiang-chieh (Chinese Taipei) Yang Ming-tse
6 June	Denmark Masters: Host: Hillerød, Denmark; Venue: Royal Stage; Level: International Challenge; Prize: $25,000; Format: 32MS/32WS/32MD/32WD/32XD	Score: 21–13, 21–16	
6 June	Denmark Masters: Host: Hillerød, Denmark; Venue: Royal Stage; Level: International Challenge; Prize: $25,000; Format: 32MS/32WS/32MD/32WD/32XD	(Hong Kong) Yeung Nga Ting (Hong Kong) Yeung Pui Lam	(Singapore) Jin Yujia (Singapore) Crystal Wong
6 June	Denmark Masters: Host: Hillerød, Denmark; Venue: Royal Stage; Level: International Challenge; Prize: $25,000; Format: 32MS/32WS/32MD/32WD/32XD	Score: 21–12, 21–17	
6 June	Denmark Masters: Host: Hillerød, Denmark; Venue: Royal Stage; Level: International Challenge; Prize: $25,000; Format: 32MS/32WS/32MD/32WD/32XD	(Indonesia) Dejan Ferdinansyah (Indonesia) Gloria Emanuelle Widjaja	(Hong Kong) Lee Chun Hei (Hong Kong) Ng Tsz Yau
6 June	Denmark Masters: Host: Hillerød, Denmark; Venue: Royal Stage; Level: International Challenge; Prize: $25,000; Format: 32MS/32WS/32MD/32WD/32XD	Score: 21–16, 21–19	
6 June	Santo Domingo Open: Host: Santo Domingo, Dominican Republic; Venue: Pabellon Tenis de Mesa; Level: International Series; Prize: $5,000; Format: 32MS/32WS/32MD/32WD/32XD	(Israel) Misha Zilberman	(Japan) Koo Takahashi
6 June	Santo Domingo Open: Host: Santo Domingo, Dominican Republic; Venue: Pabellon Tenis de Mesa; Level: International Series; Prize: $5,000; Format: 32MS/32WS/32MD/32WD/32XD	Score: 21–16, 21–15	
6 June	Santo Domingo Open: Host: Santo Domingo, Dominican Republic; Venue: Pabellon Tenis de Mesa; Level: International Series; Prize: $5,000; Format: 32MS/32WS/32MD/32WD/32XD	(Italy) Yasmine Hamza	(Slovenia) Petra Polanc
6 June	Santo Domingo Open: Host: Santo Domingo, Dominican Republic; Venue: Pabellon Tenis de Mesa; Level: International Series; Prize: $5,000; Format: 32MS/32WS/32MD/32WD/32XD	Score: 21–11, 21–9	
6 June	Santo Domingo Open: Host: Santo Domingo, Dominican Republic; Venue: Pabellon Tenis de Mesa; Level: International Series; Prize: $5,000; Format: 32MS/32WS/32MD/32WD/32XD	(Japan) Ayato Endo (Japan) Yuta Takei	(Cuba) Osleni Guerrero (Cuba) Leodannis Martinez
6 June	Santo Domingo Open: Host: Santo Domingo, Dominican Republic; Venue: Pabellon Tenis de Mesa; Level: International Series; Prize: $5,000; Format: 32MS/32WS/32MD/32WD/32XD	Score: 21–13, 21–9	
6 June	Santo Domingo Open: Host: Santo Domingo, Dominican Republic; Venue: Pabellon Tenis de Mesa; Level: International Series; Prize: $5,000; Format: 32MS/32WS/32MD/32WD/32XD	(Brazil) Sânia Lima (Brazil) Tamires Santos	(Guatemala) Diana Corleto (Guatemala) Nikté Sotomayor
6 June	Santo Domingo Open: Host: Santo Domingo, Dominican Republic; Venue: Pabellon Tenis de Mesa; Level: International Series; Prize: $5,000; Format: 32MS/32WS/32MD/32WD/32XD	Score: 21–17, 21–17	
6 June	Santo Domingo Open: Host: Santo Domingo, Dominican Republic; Venue: Pabellon Tenis de Mesa; Level: International Series; Prize: $5,000; Format: 32MS/32WS/32MD/32WD/32XD	(Japan) Sumiya Nihei (Japan) Minami Asakura	(Brazil) Davi Silva (Brazil) Sânia Lima
6 June	Santo Domingo Open: Host: Santo Domingo, Dominican Republic; Venue: Pabellon Tenis de Mesa; Level: International Series; Prize: $5,000; Format: 32MS/32WS/32MD/32WD/32XD	Score: 21–14, 21–13	
6 June	Lithuanian International: Host: Panevėžys, Lithuania; Venue: Athletic Arena; Level: Future Series; Format: 32MS/32WS/32MD/32WD/32XD	(Indonesia) Syabda Perkasa Belawa	(Indonesia) Alwi Farhan
6 June	Lithuanian International: Host: Panevėžys, Lithuania; Venue: Athletic Arena; Level: Future Series; Format: 32MS/32WS/32MD/32WD/32XD	Score: 21–15, 21–14	
6 June	Lithuanian International: Host: Panevėžys, Lithuania; Venue: Athletic Arena; Level: Future Series; Format: 32MS/32WS/32MD/32WD/32XD	(Indonesia) Aisyah Sativa Fatetani	(Indonesia) Saifi Rizka Nurhidayah
6 June	Lithuanian International: Host: Panevėžys, Lithuania; Venue: Athletic Arena; Level: Future Series; Format: 32MS/32WS/32MD/32WD/32XD	Score: 21–16, 19–21, 24–22	
6 June	Lithuanian International: Host: Panevėžys, Lithuania; Venue: Athletic Arena; Level: Future Series; Format: 32MS/32WS/32MD/32WD/32XD	(Indonesia) Rayhan Fadillah (Indonesia) Rahmat Hidayat	(France) Kenji Lovang (France) Léo Rossi
6 June	Lithuanian International: Host: Panevėžys, Lithuania; Venue: Athletic Arena; Level: Future Series; Format: 32MS/32WS/32MD/32WD/32XD	Score: 21–9, 21–13	
6 June	Lithuanian International: Host: Panevėžys, Lithuania; Venue: Athletic Arena; Level: Future Series; Format: 32MS/32WS/32MD/32WD/32XD	(Indonesia) Nethania Irawan (Indonesia) Febi Setianingrum	(Indonesia) Sofy Al Mushira Asharunnisa (Indonesia) Ridya Aulia Fatasya
6 June	Lithuanian International: Host: Panevėžys, Lithuania; Venue: Athletic Arena; Level: Future Series; Format: 32MS/32WS/32MD/32WD/32XD	Score: 21–10, 23–21	
6 June	Lithuanian International: Host: Panevėžys, Lithuania; Venue: Athletic Arena; Level: Future Series; Format: 32MS/32WS/32MD/32WD/32XD	(Indonesia) Amri Syahnawi (Indonesia) Winny Oktavina Kandow	(Hong Kong) Lui Chun Wai (Hong Kong) Fu Chi Yan
6 June	Lithuanian International: Host: Panevėžys, Lithuania; Venue: Athletic Arena; Level: Future Series; Format: 32MS/32WS/32MD/32WD/32XD	Score: 21–6, 21–11	
13 June	Indonesia Open (Draw): Host: Jakarta, Indonesia; Venue: Istora Gelora Bung Karno; Level: Super 1000; Prize: $990,000; Format: 32MS/32WS/32MD/32WD/32XD	(Denmark) Viktor Axelsen	(China) Zhao Junpeng
13 June	Indonesia Open (Draw): Host: Jakarta, Indonesia; Venue: Istora Gelora Bung Karno; Level: Super 1000; Prize: $990,000; Format: 32MS/32WS/32MD/32WD/32XD	Score: 21–9, 21–10	
13 June	Indonesia Open (Draw): Host: Jakarta, Indonesia; Venue: Istora Gelora Bung Karno; Level: Super 1000; Prize: $990,000; Format: 32MS/32WS/32MD/32WD/32XD	(Chinese Taipei) Tai Tzu-ying	(China) Wang Zhiyi
13 June	Indonesia Open (Draw): Host: Jakarta, Indonesia; Venue: Istora Gelora Bung Karno; Level: Super 1000; Prize: $990,000; Format: 32MS/32WS/32MD/32WD/32XD	Score: 21–23, 21–6, 21–15	
13 June	Indonesia Open (Draw): Host: Jakarta, Indonesia; Venue: Istora Gelora Bung Karno; Level: Super 1000; Prize: $990,000; Format: 32MS/32WS/32MD/32WD/32XD	(China) Liu Yuchen (China) Ou Xuanyi	(South Korea) Choi Sol-gyu (South Korea) Kim Won-ho
13 June	Indonesia Open (Draw): Host: Jakarta, Indonesia; Venue: Istora Gelora Bung Karno; Level: Super 1000; Prize: $990,000; Format: 32MS/32WS/32MD/32WD/32XD	Score: 21–17, 23–21	
13 June	Indonesia Open (Draw): Host: Jakarta, Indonesia; Venue: Istora Gelora Bung Karno; Level: Super 1000; Prize: $990,000; Format: 32MS/32WS/32MD/32WD/32XD	(Japan) Nami Matsuyama (Japan) Chiharu Shida	(Japan) Yuki Fukushima (Japan) Sayaka Hirota
13 June	Indonesia Open (Draw): Host: Jakarta, Indonesia; Venue: Istora Gelora Bung Karno; Level: Super 1000; Prize: $990,000; Format: 32MS/32WS/32MD/32WD/32XD	Score: 18–21, 21–14, 21–17	
13 June	Indonesia Open (Draw): Host: Jakarta, Indonesia; Venue: Istora Gelora Bung Karno; Level: Super 1000; Prize: $990,000; Format: 32MS/32WS/32MD/32WD/32XD	(China) Zheng Siwei (China) Huang Yaqiong	(Japan) Yuta Watanabe (Japan) Arisa Higashino
13 June	Indonesia Open (Draw): Host: Jakarta, Indonesia; Venue: Istora Gelora Bung Karno; Level: Super 1000; Prize: $990,000; Format: 32MS/32WS/32MD/32WD/32XD	Score: 21–14, 21–16	
13 June	Bonn International: Host: Bonn, Germany; Venue: Erwin Kranz Halle; Level: Future Series; Format: 32MS/32WS/32MD/32WD/32XD	(Malaysia) Justin Hoh	(Chinese Taipei) Su Li-yang
13 June	Bonn International: Host: Bonn, Germany; Venue: Erwin Kranz Halle; Level: Future Series; Format: 32MS/32WS/32MD/32WD/32XD	Score: 21–19, 21–17	
13 June	Bonn International: Host: Bonn, Germany; Venue: Erwin Kranz Halle; Level: Future Series; Format: 32MS/32WS/32MD/32WD/32XD	(Indonesia) Stephanie Widjaja	(Chinese Taipei) Sung Shuo-yun
13 June	Bonn International: Host: Bonn, Germany; Venue: Erwin Kranz Halle; Level: Future Series; Format: 32MS/32WS/32MD/32WD/32XD	Score: 21–18, 21–15	
13 June	Bonn International: Host: Bonn, Germany; Venue: Erwin Kranz Halle; Level: Future Series; Format: 32MS/32WS/32MD/32WD/32XD	(Chinese Taipei) Chiu Hsiang-chieh (Chinese Taipei) Yang Ming-tse	(Chinese Taipei) Liao Chao-pang (Chinese Taipei) Lin Chia-yu
13 June	Bonn International: Host: Bonn, Germany; Venue: Erwin Kranz Halle; Level: Future Series; Format: 32MS/32WS/32MD/32WD/32XD	Score: 21–15, 21–14	
13 June	Bonn International: Host: Bonn, Germany; Venue: Erwin Kranz Halle; Level: Future Series; Format: 32MS/32WS/32MD/32WD/32XD	(Chinese Taipei) Hsu Ya-ching (Chinese Taipei) Lin Wan-ching	(Indonesia) Lanny Tria Mayasari (Indonesia) Jesita Putri Miantoro
13 June	Bonn International: Host: Bonn, Germany; Venue: Erwin Kranz Halle; Level: Future Series; Format: 32MS/32WS/32MD/32WD/32XD	Score: 21–19, 12–21, 21–16	
13 June	Bonn International: Host: Bonn, Germany; Venue: Erwin Kranz Halle; Level: Future Series; Format: 32MS/32WS/32MD/32WD/32XD	(Indonesia) Amri Syahnawi (Indonesia) Winny Oktavina Kandow	(France) Samy Corvée (France) Flavie Vallet
13 June	Bonn International: Host: Bonn, Germany; Venue: Erwin Kranz Halle; Level: Future Series; Format: 32MS/32WS/32MD/32WD/32XD	Score: 21–7, 21–7	
20 June	Nantes International: Host: Rezé, France; Venue: La Trocardière; Level: International Challenge; Prize: $15,000; Format: 32MS/32WS/32MD/32WD/32XD	(Denmark) Mads Christophersen	(France) Christo Popov
20 June	Nantes International: Host: Rezé, France; Venue: La Trocardière; Level: International Challenge; Prize: $15,000; Format: 32MS/32WS/32MD/32WD/32XD	Score: 21–8, 11–21, 21–14	
20 June	Nantes International: Host: Rezé, France; Venue: La Trocardière; Level: International Challenge; Prize: $15,000; Format: 32MS/32WS/32MD/32WD/32XD	(Chinese Taipei) Hsu Wen-chi	(Chinese Taipei) Sung Shuo-yun
20 June	Nantes International: Host: Rezé, France; Venue: La Trocardière; Level: International Challenge; Prize: $15,000; Format: 32MS/32WS/32MD/32WD/32XD	Score: 20–22, 21–18, 21–11	
20 June	Nantes International: Host: Rezé, France; Venue: La Trocardière; Level: International Challenge; Prize: $15,000; Format: 32MS/32WS/32MD/32WD/32XD	(Chinese Taipei) Su Ching-heng (Chinese Taipei) Ye Hong-wei	(Thailand) Chaloempon Charoenkitamorn (Thailand) Nanthakarn Yordphaisong
20 June	Nantes International: Host: Rezé, France; Venue: La Trocardière; Level: International Challenge; Prize: $15,000; Format: 32MS/32WS/32MD/32WD/32XD	Score: 19–21, 21–17, 21–16	
20 June	Nantes International: Host: Rezé, France; Venue: La Trocardière; Level: International Challenge; Prize: $15,000; Format: 32MS/32WS/32MD/32WD/32XD	(Denmark) Julie Finne-Ipsen (Denmark) Mai Surrow	(Chinese Taipei) Hsu Ya-ching (Chinese Taipei) Lin Wan-ching
20 June	Nantes International: Host: Rezé, France; Venue: La Trocardière; Level: International Challenge; Prize: $15,000; Format: 32MS/32WS/32MD/32WD/32XD	Score: 24–22, 21–17	
20 June	Nantes International: Host: Rezé, France; Venue: La Trocardière; Level: International Challenge; Prize: $15,000; Format: 32MS/32WS/32MD/32WD/32XD	(Indonesia) Amri Syahnawi (Indonesia) Winny Oktavina Kandow	(Thailand) Ratchapol Makkasasithorn (Thailand) Jhenicha Sudjaipraparat
20 June	Nantes International: Host: Rezé, France; Venue: La Trocardière; Level: International Challenge; Prize: $15,000; Format: 32MS/32WS/32MD/32WD/32XD	Score: 21–15, 21–18	
20 June	Croatia Open: Host: Dubrovnik, Croatia; Venue: Gospino Polje hall; Level: Future Series; Prize: $1,000; Format: 32MS/32WS/24MD/24WD/24XD	(Malaysia) Justin Hoh	(Vietnam) Nguyễn Hải Đang
20 June	Croatia Open: Host: Dubrovnik, Croatia; Venue: Gospino Polje hall; Level: Future Series; Prize: $1,000; Format: 32MS/32WS/24MD/24WD/24XD	Score: 21–15, 16–21, 21–18	
20 June	Croatia Open: Host: Dubrovnik, Croatia; Venue: Gospino Polje hall; Level: Future Series; Prize: $1,000; Format: 32MS/32WS/24MD/24WD/24XD	(Vietnam) Vũ Thị Anh Thư	(Hong Kong) Saloni Samirbhai Mehta
20 June	Croatia Open: Host: Dubrovnik, Croatia; Venue: Gospino Polje hall; Level: Future Series; Prize: $1,000; Format: 32MS/32WS/24MD/24WD/24XD	Score: 21–9, 16–21, 21–14	
20 June	Croatia Open: Host: Dubrovnik, Croatia; Venue: Gospino Polje hall; Level: Future Series; Prize: $1,000; Format: 32MS/32WS/24MD/24WD/24XD	(Singapore) Donovan Willard Wee (Singapore) Howin Wong	(Hong Kong) Chow Hin Long (Hong Kong) Lui Chun Wai
20 June	Croatia Open: Host: Dubrovnik, Croatia; Venue: Gospino Polje hall; Level: Future Series; Prize: $1,000; Format: 32MS/32WS/24MD/24WD/24XD	Score: 23–25, 21–11, 21–18	
20 June	Croatia Open: Host: Dubrovnik, Croatia; Venue: Gospino Polje hall; Level: Future Series; Prize: $1,000; Format: 32MS/32WS/24MD/24WD/24XD	(Hong Kong) Lui Lok Lok (Hong Kong) Ng Shiu Yee	(Latvia) Anna Kupca (Latvia) Jekaterina Romanova
20 June	Croatia Open: Host: Dubrovnik, Croatia; Venue: Gospino Polje hall; Level: Future Series; Prize: $1,000; Format: 32MS/32WS/24MD/24WD/24XD	Score: 21–11, 21–8	
20 June	Croatia Open: Host: Dubrovnik, Croatia; Venue: Gospino Polje hall; Level: Future Series; Prize: $1,000; Format: 32MS/32WS/24MD/24WD/24XD	(England) Jonty Russ (England) Sian Kelly	(Germany) Patrick Scheiel (Germany) Franziska Volkmann
20 June	Croatia Open: Host: Dubrovnik, Croatia; Venue: Gospino Polje hall; Level: Future Series; Prize: $1,000; Format: 32MS/32WS/24MD/24WD/24XD	Score: 18–21, 22–20, 21–16	
20 June	Pacific Mini Games Mixed Team (Draw): Host: Saipan, Northern Mariana Islands; Venue: Gilbert C. Ada Gymnasium; Level: Multisport; Format: 6 XT	Tahiti	New Caledonia
20 June	Pacific Mini Games Mixed Team (Draw): Host: Saipan, Northern Mariana Islands; Venue: Gilbert C. Ada Gymnasium; Level: Multisport; Format: 6 XT	Score: Round robin	
20 June	Pacific Mini Games Individual Events (Draw): Host: Saipan, Northern Mariana Islands; Venue: Gilbert C. Ada Gymnasium; Level: Multisport; Format: 32MS/32WS/16MD/16WD/32XD	(French Polynesia) Rémi Rossi	(New Caledonia) Yohan De Geoffroy
20 June	Pacific Mini Games Individual Events (Draw): Host: Saipan, Northern Mariana Islands; Venue: Gilbert C. Ada Gymnasium; Level: Multisport; Format: 32MS/32WS/16MD/16WD/32XD	Score: 21–4, 21–14	
20 June	Pacific Mini Games Individual Events (Draw): Host: Saipan, Northern Mariana Islands; Venue: Gilbert C. Ada Gymnasium; Level: Multisport; Format: 32MS/32WS/16MD/16WD/32XD	(French Polynesia) Jenica Lesourd	(New Caledonia) Marine Souviat
20 June	Pacific Mini Games Individual Events (Draw): Host: Saipan, Northern Mariana Islands; Venue: Gilbert C. Ada Gymnasium; Level: Multisport; Format: 32MS/32WS/16MD/16WD/32XD	Score: 21–16, 21–19	
20 June	Pacific Mini Games Individual Events (Draw): Host: Saipan, Northern Mariana Islands; Venue: Gilbert C. Ada Gymnasium; Level: Multisport; Format: 32MS/32WS/16MD/16WD/32XD	(French Polynesia) Léo Cucuel (French Polynesia) Remi Rossi	(French Polynesia) Glen Le Foll (French Polynesia) Kyliam Scilloux
20 June	Pacific Mini Games Individual Events (Draw): Host: Saipan, Northern Mariana Islands; Venue: Gilbert C. Ada Gymnasium; Level: Multisport; Format: 32MS/32WS/16MD/16WD/32XD	Score: 21–18, 21–8	
20 June	Pacific Mini Games Individual Events (Draw): Host: Saipan, Northern Mariana Islands; Venue: Gilbert C. Ada Gymnasium; Level: Multisport; Format: 32MS/32WS/16MD/16WD/32XD	(French Polynesia) Jenica Lesourd (French Polynesia) Mélissa Mi You	(New Caledonia) Johanna Kou (New Caledonia) Marine Souviat
20 June	Pacific Mini Games Individual Events (Draw): Host: Saipan, Northern Mariana Islands; Venue: Gilbert C. Ada Gymnasium; Level: Multisport; Format: 32MS/32WS/16MD/16WD/32XD	Score: 21–6, 21–17	
20 June	Pacific Mini Games Individual Events (Draw): Host: Saipan, Northern Mariana Islands; Venue: Gilbert C. Ada Gymnasium; Level: Multisport; Format: 32MS/32WS/16MD/16WD/32XD	(French Polynesia) Rémi Rossi (French Polynesia) Mélissa Mi You	(New Caledonia) Yohan De Geoffroy (New Caledonia) Marine Souviat
20 June	Pacific Mini Games Individual Events (Draw): Host: Saipan, Northern Mariana Islands; Venue: Gilbert C. Ada Gymnasium; Level: Multisport; Format: 32MS/32WS/16MD/16WD/32XD	Score: 21–10, 21–9	
27 June	Malaysia Open (Draw): Host: Kuala Lumpur, Malaysia; Venue: Axiata Arena; Level: Super 750; Prize: $675,000; Format: 32MS/32WS/32MD/32WD/32XD	(Denmark) Viktor Axelsen	(Japan) Kento Momota
27 June	Malaysia Open (Draw): Host: Kuala Lumpur, Malaysia; Venue: Axiata Arena; Level: Super 750; Prize: $675,000; Format: 32MS/32WS/32MD/32WD/32XD	Score: 21–4, 21–7	
27 June	Malaysia Open (Draw): Host: Kuala Lumpur, Malaysia; Venue: Axiata Arena; Level: Super 750; Prize: $675,000; Format: 32MS/32WS/32MD/32WD/32XD	(Thailand) Ratchanok Intanon	(China) Chen Yufei
27 June	Malaysia Open (Draw): Host: Kuala Lumpur, Malaysia; Venue: Axiata Arena; Level: Super 750; Prize: $675,000; Format: 32MS/32WS/32MD/32WD/32XD	Score: 21–15, 13–21, 21–16	
27 June	Malaysia Open (Draw): Host: Kuala Lumpur, Malaysia; Venue: Axiata Arena; Level: Super 750; Prize: $675,000; Format: 32MS/32WS/32MD/32WD/32XD	(Japan) Takuro Hoki (Japan) Yugo Kobayashi	(Indonesia) Fajar Alfian (Indonesia) Muhammad Rian Ardianto
27 June	Malaysia Open (Draw): Host: Kuala Lumpur, Malaysia; Venue: Axiata Arena; Level: Super 750; Prize: $675,000; Format: 32MS/32WS/32MD/32WD/32XD	Score: 24–22, 16–21, 21–9	
27 June	Malaysia Open (Draw): Host: Kuala Lumpur, Malaysia; Venue: Axiata Arena; Level: Super 750; Prize: $675,000; Format: 32MS/32WS/32MD/32WD/32XD	(Indonesia) Apriyani Rahayu (Indonesia) Siti Fadia Silva Ramadhanti	(China) Zhang Shuxian (China) Zheng Yu
27 June	Malaysia Open (Draw): Host: Kuala Lumpur, Malaysia; Venue: Axiata Arena; Level: Super 750; Prize: $675,000; Format: 32MS/32WS/32MD/32WD/32XD	Score: 21–18, 12–21, 21–19	
27 June	Malaysia Open (Draw): Host: Kuala Lumpur, Malaysia; Venue: Axiata Arena; Level: Super 750; Prize: $675,000; Format: 32MS/32WS/32MD/32WD/32XD	(China) Zheng Siwei (China) Huang Yaqiong	(Thailand) Dechapol Puavaranukroh (Thailand) Sapsiree Taerattanachai
27 June	Malaysia Open (Draw): Host: Kuala Lumpur, Malaysia; Venue: Axiata Arena; Level: Super 750; Prize: $675,000; Format: 32MS/32WS/32MD/32WD/32XD	Score: 21–13, 21–18	

=== July ===
Week commencing	Tournament	Champions	Runners-up
4 July	Malaysia Masters (Draw): Host: Kuala Lumpur, Malaysia; Venue: Axiata Arena; Level: Super 500; Prize: $360,000; Format: 32MS/32WS/32MD/32WD/32XD	(Indonesia) Chico Aura Dwi Wardoyo	(Hong Kong) Ng Ka Long
4 July	Malaysia Masters (Draw): Host: Kuala Lumpur, Malaysia; Venue: Axiata Arena; Level: Super 500; Prize: $360,000; Format: 32MS/32WS/32MD/32WD/32XD	Score: 22–20, 21–15	
4 July	Malaysia Masters (Draw): Host: Kuala Lumpur, Malaysia; Venue: Axiata Arena; Level: Super 500; Prize: $360,000; Format: 32MS/32WS/32MD/32WD/32XD	(South Korea) An Se-young	(China) Chen Yufei
4 July	Malaysia Masters (Draw): Host: Kuala Lumpur, Malaysia; Venue: Axiata Arena; Level: Super 500; Prize: $360,000; Format: 32MS/32WS/32MD/32WD/32XD	Score: 21–17, 21–5	
4 July	Malaysia Masters (Draw): Host: Kuala Lumpur, Malaysia; Venue: Axiata Arena; Level: Super 500; Prize: $360,000; Format: 32MS/32WS/32MD/32WD/32XD	(Indonesia) Fajar Alfian (Indonesia) Muhammad Rian Ardianto	(Indonesia) Mohammad Ahsan (Indonesia) Hendra Setiawan
4 July	Malaysia Masters (Draw): Host: Kuala Lumpur, Malaysia; Venue: Axiata Arena; Level: Super 500; Prize: $360,000; Format: 32MS/32WS/32MD/32WD/32XD	Score: 21–12, 21–19	
4 July	Malaysia Masters (Draw): Host: Kuala Lumpur, Malaysia; Venue: Axiata Arena; Level: Super 500; Prize: $360,000; Format: 32MS/32WS/32MD/32WD/32XD	(China) Chen Qingchen (China) Jia Yifan	(Japan) Nami Matsuyama (Japan) Chiharu Shida
4 July	Malaysia Masters (Draw): Host: Kuala Lumpur, Malaysia; Venue: Axiata Arena; Level: Super 500; Prize: $360,000; Format: 32MS/32WS/32MD/32WD/32XD	Score: 21–11, 21–12	
4 July	Malaysia Masters (Draw): Host: Kuala Lumpur, Malaysia; Venue: Axiata Arena; Level: Super 500; Prize: $360,000; Format: 32MS/32WS/32MD/32WD/32XD	(China) Zheng Siwei (China) Huang Yaqiong	(Indonesia) Rinov Rivaldy (Indonesia) Pitha Haningtyas Mentari
4 July	Malaysia Masters (Draw): Host: Kuala Lumpur, Malaysia; Venue: Axiata Arena; Level: Super 500; Prize: $360,000; Format: 32MS/32WS/32MD/32WD/32XD	Score: 21–17, 21–12	
4 July	White Nights (cancelled) (Note: This tournament, originally to be played on 6–10 July, was later cancelled due to the Russian invasion of Ukraine.): Host: Gatchina, Russia; Venue: FOK Arena; Level: International Challenge; Prize: $15,000; Format: 32MS/32WS/32MD/32WD/32XD		
4 July	White Nights (cancelled): Host: Gatchina, Russia; Venue: FOK Arena; Level: International Challenge; Prize: $15,000; Format: 32MS/32WS/32MD/32WD/32XD	Score:	
4 July	White Nights (cancelled): Host: Gatchina, Russia; Venue: FOK Arena; Level: International Challenge; Prize: $15,000; Format: 32MS/32WS/32MD/32WD/32XD	Score:	
4 July	White Nights (cancelled): Host: Gatchina, Russia; Venue: FOK Arena; Level: International Challenge; Prize: $15,000; Format: 32MS/32WS/32MD/32WD/32XD	Score:	
4 July	White Nights (cancelled): Host: Gatchina, Russia; Venue: FOK Arena; Level: International Challenge; Prize: $15,000; Format: 32MS/32WS/32MD/32WD/32XD	Score:	
4 July	White Nights (cancelled): Host: Gatchina, Russia; Venue: FOK Arena; Level: International Challenge; Prize: $15,000; Format: 32MS/32WS/32MD/32WD/32XD	Score:	
11 July	Singapore Open (Draw): Host: Singapore; Venue: Singapore Indoor Stadium; Level: Super 500; Prize: $370,000; Format: 32MS/32WS/32MD/32WD/32XD	(Indonesia) Anthony Sinisuka Ginting	(Japan) Kodai Naraoka
11 July	Singapore Open (Draw): Host: Singapore; Venue: Singapore Indoor Stadium; Level: Super 500; Prize: $370,000; Format: 32MS/32WS/32MD/32WD/32XD	Score: 23–21, 21–17	
11 July	Singapore Open (Draw): Host: Singapore; Venue: Singapore Indoor Stadium; Level: Super 500; Prize: $370,000; Format: 32MS/32WS/32MD/32WD/32XD	(India) P. V. Sindhu	(China) Wang Zhiyi
11 July	Singapore Open (Draw): Host: Singapore; Venue: Singapore Indoor Stadium; Level: Super 500; Prize: $370,000; Format: 32MS/32WS/32MD/32WD/32XD	Score: 21–9, 11–21, 21–15	
11 July	Singapore Open (Draw): Host: Singapore; Venue: Singapore Indoor Stadium; Level: Super 500; Prize: $370,000; Format: 32MS/32WS/32MD/32WD/32XD	(Indonesia) Leo Rolly Carnando (Indonesia) Daniel Marthin	(Indonesia) Fajar Alfian (Indonesia) Muhammad Rian Ardianto
11 July	Singapore Open (Draw): Host: Singapore; Venue: Singapore Indoor Stadium; Level: Super 500; Prize: $370,000; Format: 32MS/32WS/32MD/32WD/32XD	Score: 9–21, 21–14, 21–16	
11 July	Singapore Open (Draw): Host: Singapore; Venue: Singapore Indoor Stadium; Level: Super 500; Prize: $370,000; Format: 32MS/32WS/32MD/32WD/32XD	(Indonesia) Apriyani Rahayu (Indonesia) Siti Fadia Silva Ramadhanti	(China) Zhang Shuxian (China) Zheng Yu
11 July	Singapore Open (Draw): Host: Singapore; Venue: Singapore Indoor Stadium; Level: Super 500; Prize: $370,000; Format: 32MS/32WS/32MD/32WD/32XD	Score: 21–14, 21–17	
11 July	Singapore Open (Draw): Host: Singapore; Venue: Singapore Indoor Stadium; Level: Super 500; Prize: $370,000; Format: 32MS/32WS/32MD/32WD/32XD	(Thailand) Dechapol Puavaranukroh (Thailand) Sapsiree Taerattanachai	(China) Wang Yilyu (China) Huang Dongping
11 July	Singapore Open (Draw): Host: Singapore; Venue: Singapore Indoor Stadium; Level: Super 500; Prize: $370,000; Format: 32MS/32WS/32MD/32WD/32XD	Score: 21–12, 21–17	
11 July	Réunion Open: Host: Saint-Denis, Réunion; Venue: Gymnase de Champ-Fleuri; Level: International Challenge; Prize: $25,000; Format: 32MS/32WS/32MD/32WD/32XD	(Japan) Riku Hatano	(Japan) Yushi Tanaka
11 July	Réunion Open: Host: Saint-Denis, Réunion; Venue: Gymnase de Champ-Fleuri; Level: International Challenge; Prize: $25,000; Format: 32MS/32WS/32MD/32WD/32XD	Score: 21–16, 21–17	
11 July	Réunion Open: Host: Saint-Denis, Réunion; Venue: Gymnase de Champ-Fleuri; Level: International Challenge; Prize: $25,000; Format: 32MS/32WS/32MD/32WD/32XD	(Japan) Riko Gunji	(Japan) Natsuki Oie
11 July	Réunion Open: Host: Saint-Denis, Réunion; Venue: Gymnase de Champ-Fleuri; Level: International Challenge; Prize: $25,000; Format: 32MS/32WS/32MD/32WD/32XD	Score: 21–5, 21–14	
11 July	Réunion Open: Host: Saint-Denis, Réunion; Venue: Gymnase de Champ-Fleuri; Level: International Challenge; Prize: $25,000; Format: 32MS/32WS/32MD/32WD/32XD	(Japan) Shuntaro Mezaki (Japan) Haruya Nishida	(Japan) Takuto Inoue (Japan) Kenya Mitsuhashi
11 July	Réunion Open: Host: Saint-Denis, Réunion; Venue: Gymnase de Champ-Fleuri; Level: International Challenge; Prize: $25,000; Format: 32MS/32WS/32MD/32WD/32XD	Score: 16–21, 21–18, 21–10	
11 July	Réunion Open: Host: Saint-Denis, Réunion; Venue: Gymnase de Champ-Fleuri; Level: International Challenge; Prize: $25,000; Format: 32MS/32WS/32MD/32WD/32XD	(Germany) Annabella Jäger (Germany) Leona Michalski	(India) Rutaparna Panda (India) Swetaparna Panda
11 July	Réunion Open: Host: Saint-Denis, Réunion; Venue: Gymnase de Champ-Fleuri; Level: International Challenge; Prize: $25,000; Format: 32MS/32WS/32MD/32WD/32XD	Score: 13–21, 21–18, 21–18	
11 July	Réunion Open: Host: Saint-Denis, Réunion; Venue: Gymnase de Champ-Fleuri; Level: International Challenge; Prize: $25,000; Format: 32MS/32WS/32MD/32WD/32XD	(Japan) Sumiya Nihei (Japan) Minami Asakura	(Japan) Naoki Yamada (Japan) Moe Ikeuchi
11 July	Réunion Open: Host: Saint-Denis, Réunion; Venue: Gymnase de Champ-Fleuri; Level: International Challenge; Prize: $25,000; Format: 32MS/32WS/32MD/32WD/32XD	Score: 21–16, 19–21, 21–15	
18 July	Taipei Open (Draw): Host: Taipei, Taiwan; Venue: Taipei Heping Basketball Gymnasium; Level: Super 300; Prize: $500,000; Format: 32MS/32WS/32MD/32WD/32XD	(Chinese Taipei) Chou Tien-chen	(Japan) Kodai Naraoka
18 July	Taipei Open (Draw): Host: Taipei, Taiwan; Venue: Taipei Heping Basketball Gymnasium; Level: Super 300; Prize: $500,000; Format: 32MS/32WS/32MD/32WD/32XD	Score: 14–21, 21–10, 21–6	
18 July	Taipei Open (Draw): Host: Taipei, Taiwan; Venue: Taipei Heping Basketball Gymnasium; Level: Super 300; Prize: $500,000; Format: 32MS/32WS/32MD/32WD/32XD	(Chinese Taipei) Tai Tzu-ying	(Japan) Saena Kawakami
18 July	Taipei Open (Draw): Host: Taipei, Taiwan; Venue: Taipei Heping Basketball Gymnasium; Level: Super 300; Prize: $500,000; Format: 32MS/32WS/32MD/32WD/32XD	Score: 21–17, 21–16	
18 July	Taipei Open (Draw): Host: Taipei, Taiwan; Venue: Taipei Heping Basketball Gymnasium; Level: Super 300; Prize: $500,000; Format: 32MS/32WS/32MD/32WD/32XD	(Malaysia) Man Wei Chong (Malaysia) Tee Kai Wun	(Chinese Taipei) Lee Yang (Chinese Taipei) Wang Chi-lin
18 July	Taipei Open (Draw): Host: Taipei, Taiwan; Venue: Taipei Heping Basketball Gymnasium; Level: Super 300; Prize: $500,000; Format: 32MS/32WS/32MD/32WD/32XD	Score: 21–18, 11–21, 21–18	
18 July	Taipei Open (Draw): Host: Taipei, Taiwan; Venue: Taipei Heping Basketball Gymnasium; Level: Super 300; Prize: $500,000; Format: 32MS/32WS/32MD/32WD/32XD	(Hong Kong) Ng Tsz Yau (Hong Kong) Tsang Hiu Yan	(Japan) Rui Hirokami (Japan) Yuna Kato
18 July	Taipei Open (Draw): Host: Taipei, Taiwan; Venue: Taipei Heping Basketball Gymnasium; Level: Super 300; Prize: $500,000; Format: 32MS/32WS/32MD/32WD/32XD	Score: 21–15, 18–21, 21–19	
18 July	Taipei Open (Draw): Host: Taipei, Taiwan; Venue: Taipei Heping Basketball Gymnasium; Level: Super 300; Prize: $500,000; Format: 32MS/32WS/32MD/32WD/32XD	(Hong Kong) Lee Chun Hei (Hong Kong) Ng Tsz Yau	(Thailand) Ruttanapak Oupthong (Thailand) Chasinee Korepap
18 July	Taipei Open (Draw): Host: Taipei, Taiwan; Venue: Taipei Heping Basketball Gymnasium; Level: Super 300; Prize: $500,000; Format: 32MS/32WS/32MD/32WD/32XD	Score: 21–8, 21–9	
25 July	Commonwealth Games Mixed Team (Draw): Host: Birmingham, England; Venue: National Exhibition Centre; Level: Multisport; Format: 16 XT	Malaysia	India
25 July	Commonwealth Games Mixed Team (Draw): Host: Birmingham, England; Venue: National Exhibition Centre; Level: Multisport; Format: 16 XT	Aaron Chia; Soh Wooi Yik	Satwiksairaj Rankireddy; Chirag Shetty
25 July	Commonwealth Games Mixed Team (Draw): Host: Birmingham, England; Venue: National Exhibition Centre; Level: Multisport; Format: 16 XT	Goh Jin Wei	P. V. Sindhu
25 July	Commonwealth Games Mixed Team (Draw): Host: Birmingham, England; Venue: National Exhibition Centre; Level: Multisport; Format: 16 XT	Ng Tze Yong	Srikanth Kidambi
25 July	Commonwealth Games Mixed Team (Draw): Host: Birmingham, England; Venue: National Exhibition Centre; Level: Multisport; Format: 16 XT	Pearly Tan; Thinaah Muralitharan	Treesa Jolly; Gayatri Gopichand
25 July	Commonwealth Games Mixed Team (Draw): Host: Birmingham, England; Venue: National Exhibition Centre; Level: Multisport; Format: 16 XT	Tan Kian Meng; Lai Pei Jing	Satwiksairaj Rankireddy; Ashwini Ponnappa
25 July	Commonwealth Games Mixed Team (Draw): Host: Birmingham, England; Venue: National Exhibition Centre; Level: Multisport; Format: 16 XT	Score: 3–1	
25 July	Akita Masters (Draw) (cancelled) (Note: This tournament, originally to be played on 26–31 July, was later cancelled due to the COVID-19 pandemic in Japan.): Host: Akita, Japan; Venue: CNA Arena Akita; Level: Super 100; Prize: $100,000; Format: 48MS/32WS/32MD/32WD/32XD		
25 July	Akita Masters (Draw) (cancelled): Host: Akita, Japan; Venue: CNA Arena Akita; Level: Super 100; Prize: $100,000; Format: 48MS/32WS/32MD/32WD/32XD	Score:	
25 July	Akita Masters (Draw) (cancelled): Host: Akita, Japan; Venue: CNA Arena Akita; Level: Super 100; Prize: $100,000; Format: 48MS/32WS/32MD/32WD/32XD	Score:	
25 July	Akita Masters (Draw) (cancelled): Host: Akita, Japan; Venue: CNA Arena Akita; Level: Super 100; Prize: $100,000; Format: 48MS/32WS/32MD/32WD/32XD	Score:	
25 July	Akita Masters (Draw) (cancelled): Host: Akita, Japan; Venue: CNA Arena Akita; Level: Super 100; Prize: $100,000; Format: 48MS/32WS/32MD/32WD/32XD	Score:	
25 July	Akita Masters (Draw) (cancelled): Host: Akita, Japan; Venue: CNA Arena Akita; Level: Super 100; Prize: $100,000; Format: 48MS/32WS/32MD/32WD/32XD	Score:	

=== August ===
Week commencing	Tournament	Champions	Runners-up
1 August	Commonwealth Games (Draw): Host: Birmingham, England; Venue: National Exhibition Centre; Level: Multisport; Format: 48MS/46WS/27MD/28WD/49XD	(India) Lakshya Sen	(Malaysia) Ng Tze Yong
1 August	Commonwealth Games (Draw): Host: Birmingham, England; Venue: National Exhibition Centre; Level: Multisport; Format: 48MS/46WS/27MD/28WD/49XD	Score: 19–21, 21–9, 21–16	
1 August	Commonwealth Games (Draw): Host: Birmingham, England; Venue: National Exhibition Centre; Level: Multisport; Format: 48MS/46WS/27MD/28WD/49XD	(India) P. V. Sindhu	(Canada) Michelle Li
1 August	Commonwealth Games (Draw): Host: Birmingham, England; Venue: National Exhibition Centre; Level: Multisport; Format: 48MS/46WS/27MD/28WD/49XD	Score: 21–15, 21–13	
1 August	Commonwealth Games (Draw): Host: Birmingham, England; Venue: National Exhibition Centre; Level: Multisport; Format: 48MS/46WS/27MD/28WD/49XD	(India) Satwiksairaj Rankireddy (India) Chirag Shetty	(England) Ben Lane (England) Sean Vendy
1 August	Commonwealth Games (Draw): Host: Birmingham, England; Venue: National Exhibition Centre; Level: Multisport; Format: 48MS/46WS/27MD/28WD/49XD	Score: 21–15, 21–13	
1 August	Commonwealth Games (Draw): Host: Birmingham, England; Venue: National Exhibition Centre; Level: Multisport; Format: 48MS/46WS/27MD/28WD/49XD	(Malaysia) Pearly Tan (Malaysia) Thinaah Muralitharan	(England) Chloe Birch (England) Lauren Smith
1 August	Commonwealth Games (Draw): Host: Birmingham, England; Venue: National Exhibition Centre; Level: Multisport; Format: 48MS/46WS/27MD/28WD/49XD	Score: 21–5, 21–8	
1 August	Commonwealth Games (Draw): Host: Birmingham, England; Venue: National Exhibition Centre; Level: Multisport; Format: 48MS/46WS/27MD/28WD/49XD	(Singapore) Terry Hee (Singapore) Tan Wei Han	(England) Marcus Ellis (England) Lauren Smith
1 August	Commonwealth Games (Draw): Host: Birmingham, England; Venue: National Exhibition Centre; Level: Multisport; Format: 48MS/46WS/27MD/28WD/49XD	Score: 21–16, 21–15	
15 August	Mongolia International: Host: Ulaanbaatar, Mongolia; Venue: National Sports Center; Level: International Challenge; Prize: $15,000; Format: 32MS/32WS/32MD/16WD/32XD	(Chinese Taipei) Lin Chun-yi	(Chinese Taipei) Su Li-yang
15 August	Mongolia International: Host: Ulaanbaatar, Mongolia; Venue: National Sports Center; Level: International Challenge; Prize: $15,000; Format: 32MS/32WS/32MD/16WD/32XD	Score: 21–16, 21–14	
15 August	Mongolia International: Host: Ulaanbaatar, Mongolia; Venue: National Sports Center; Level: International Challenge; Prize: $15,000; Format: 32MS/32WS/32MD/16WD/32XD	(Indonesia) Sri Fatmawati	(Indonesia) Ester Nurumi Tri Wardoyo
15 August	Mongolia International: Host: Ulaanbaatar, Mongolia; Venue: National Sports Center; Level: International Challenge; Prize: $15,000; Format: 32MS/32WS/32MD/16WD/32XD	Score: 21–14, 23–21	
15 August	Mongolia International: Host: Ulaanbaatar, Mongolia; Venue: National Sports Center; Level: International Challenge; Prize: $15,000; Format: 32MS/32WS/32MD/16WD/32XD	(Japan) Ayato Endo (Japan) Yuta Takei	(Japan) Takuto Inoue (Japan) Kenya Mitsuhashi
15 August	Mongolia International: Host: Ulaanbaatar, Mongolia; Venue: National Sports Center; Level: International Challenge; Prize: $15,000; Format: 32MS/32WS/32MD/16WD/32XD	Score: 21–14, 12–21, 21–19	
15 August	Mongolia International: Host: Ulaanbaatar, Mongolia; Venue: National Sports Center; Level: International Challenge; Prize: $15,000; Format: 32MS/32WS/32MD/16WD/32XD	(South Korea) Seong Seung-yeon (South Korea) Yoon Min-ah	(South Korea) Kim Hye-rin (South Korea) Seong Ji-yeong
15 August	Mongolia International: Host: Ulaanbaatar, Mongolia; Venue: National Sports Center; Level: International Challenge; Prize: $15,000; Format: 32MS/32WS/32MD/16WD/32XD	Score: 21–10, 21–17	
15 August	Mongolia International: Host: Ulaanbaatar, Mongolia; Venue: National Sports Center; Level: International Challenge; Prize: $15,000; Format: 32MS/32WS/32MD/16WD/32XD	(South Korea) Choi Hyun-beom (South Korea) Yoon Min-ah	(South Korea) Ki Dong-ju (South Korea) Kim Hye-rin
15 August	Mongolia International: Host: Ulaanbaatar, Mongolia; Venue: National Sports Center; Level: International Challenge; Prize: $15,000; Format: 32MS/32WS/32MD/16WD/32XD	Score: 13–21, 21–13, 21–15	
22 August	World Championships (Draw): Host: Tokyo, Japan; Venue: Tokyo Metropolitan Gymnasium; Level: World Championships; Prize: N/A; Format: 64MS/48WS/48MD/48WD/48XD	(Denmark) Viktor Axelsen	(Thailand) Kunlavut Vitidsarn
22 August	World Championships (Draw): Host: Tokyo, Japan; Venue: Tokyo Metropolitan Gymnasium; Level: World Championships; Prize: N/A; Format: 64MS/48WS/48MD/48WD/48XD	Score: 21–5, 21–16	
22 August	World Championships (Draw): Host: Tokyo, Japan; Venue: Tokyo Metropolitan Gymnasium; Level: World Championships; Prize: N/A; Format: 64MS/48WS/48MD/48WD/48XD	(Japan) Akane Yamaguchi	(China) Chen Yufei
22 August	World Championships (Draw): Host: Tokyo, Japan; Venue: Tokyo Metropolitan Gymnasium; Level: World Championships; Prize: N/A; Format: 64MS/48WS/48MD/48WD/48XD	Score: 21–12, 10–21, 21–14	
22 August	World Championships (Draw): Host: Tokyo, Japan; Venue: Tokyo Metropolitan Gymnasium; Level: World Championships; Prize: N/A; Format: 64MS/48WS/48MD/48WD/48XD	(Malaysia) Aaron Chia (Malaysia) Soh Wooi Yik	(Indonesia) Mohammad Ahsan (Indonesia) Hendra Setiawan
22 August	World Championships (Draw): Host: Tokyo, Japan; Venue: Tokyo Metropolitan Gymnasium; Level: World Championships; Prize: N/A; Format: 64MS/48WS/48MD/48WD/48XD	Score: 21–19, 21–14	
22 August	World Championships (Draw): Host: Tokyo, Japan; Venue: Tokyo Metropolitan Gymnasium; Level: World Championships; Prize: N/A; Format: 64MS/48WS/48MD/48WD/48XD	(China) Chen Qingchen (China) Jia Yifan	(South Korea) Kim So-yeong (South Korea) Kong Hee-yong
22 August	World Championships (Draw): Host: Tokyo, Japan; Venue: Tokyo Metropolitan Gymnasium; Level: World Championships; Prize: N/A; Format: 64MS/48WS/48MD/48WD/48XD	Score: 22–20, 21–14	
22 August	World Championships (Draw): Host: Tokyo, Japan; Venue: Tokyo Metropolitan Gymnasium; Level: World Championships; Prize: N/A; Format: 64MS/48WS/48MD/48WD/48XD	(China) Zheng Siwei (China) Huang Yaqiong	(Japan) Yuta Watanabe (Japan) Arisa Higashino
22 August	World Championships (Draw): Host: Tokyo, Japan; Venue: Tokyo Metropolitan Gymnasium; Level: World Championships; Prize: N/A; Format: 64MS/48WS/48MD/48WD/48XD	Score: 21–13, 21–16	
22 August	Cameroon International: Host: Yaoundé, Cameroon; Venue: Yaounde Sports Complex; Level: International Series; Prize: $10,000; Format: 32MS/32WS/16MD/8WD/16XD	(India) Sathish Kumar Karunakaran	(Malaysia) Chua Kim Sheng
22 August	Cameroon International: Host: Yaoundé, Cameroon; Venue: Yaounde Sports Complex; Level: International Series; Prize: $10,000; Format: 32MS/32WS/16MD/8WD/16XD	Score: 21–13, 21–13	
22 August	Cameroon International: Host: Yaoundé, Cameroon; Venue: Yaounde Sports Complex; Level: International Series; Prize: $10,000; Format: 32MS/32WS/16MD/8WD/16XD	(Malaysia) Kasturi Radhakrishnan	(India) Likhita Srivastava
22 August	Cameroon International: Host: Yaoundé, Cameroon; Venue: Yaounde Sports Complex; Level: International Series; Prize: $10,000; Format: 32MS/32WS/16MD/8WD/16XD	Score: 21–13, 18–21, 21–16	
22 August	Cameroon International: Host: Yaoundé, Cameroon; Venue: Yaounde Sports Complex; Level: International Series; Prize: $10,000; Format: 32MS/32WS/16MD/8WD/16XD	(Philippines) Christian Bernardo (Philippines) Alvin Morada	(India) Dhruv Rawat (India) Chirag Sen
22 August	Cameroon International: Host: Yaoundé, Cameroon; Venue: Yaounde Sports Complex; Level: International Series; Prize: $10,000; Format: 32MS/32WS/16MD/8WD/16XD	Score: 21–12, 21–13	
22 August	Cameroon International: Host: Yaoundé, Cameroon; Venue: Yaounde Sports Complex; Level: International Series; Prize: $10,000; Format: 32MS/32WS/16MD/8WD/16XD	(India) Srivedya Gurazada (India) Poorvisha S. Ram	(Malaysia) Kasturi Radhakrishnan (Malaysia) Venosha Radhakrishnan
22 August	Cameroon International: Host: Yaoundé, Cameroon; Venue: Yaounde Sports Complex; Level: International Series; Prize: $10,000; Format: 32MS/32WS/16MD/8WD/16XD	Score: 21–12, 21–14	
22 August	Cameroon International: Host: Yaoundé, Cameroon; Venue: Yaounde Sports Complex; Level: International Series; Prize: $10,000; Format: 32MS/32WS/16MD/8WD/16XD	(Philippines) Alvin Morada (Philippines) Alyssa Leonardo	(India) Sathish Kumar Karunakaran (India) Aadya Variyath
22 August	Cameroon International: Host: Yaoundé, Cameroon; Venue: Yaounde Sports Complex; Level: International Series; Prize: $10,000; Format: 32MS/32WS/16MD/8WD/16XD	Score: 21–19, 18–21, 22–20	
22 August	Future Series Nouvelle-Aquitaine: Host: Pessac, France; Venue: Grand Complexe Sportif de Bellegrave; Level: Future Series; Format: 32MS/32WS/32MD/8WD/32XD	(Singapore) Lim Ming Hong	(France) Valentin Singer
22 August	Future Series Nouvelle-Aquitaine: Host: Pessac, France; Venue: Grand Complexe Sportif de Bellegrave; Level: Future Series; Format: 32MS/32WS/32MD/8WD/32XD	Score: 16–21, 21–18, 21–16	
22 August	Future Series Nouvelle-Aquitaine: Host: Pessac, France; Venue: Grand Complexe Sportif de Bellegrave; Level: Future Series; Format: 32MS/32WS/32MD/8WD/32XD	(Vietnam) Vũ Thị Anh Thư	(Switzerland) Milena Schnider
22 August	Future Series Nouvelle-Aquitaine: Host: Pessac, France; Venue: Grand Complexe Sportif de Bellegrave; Level: Future Series; Format: 32MS/32WS/32MD/8WD/32XD	Score: 21–17, 21–12	
22 August	Future Series Nouvelle-Aquitaine: Host: Pessac, France; Venue: Grand Complexe Sportif de Bellegrave; Level: Future Series; Format: 32MS/32WS/32MD/8WD/32XD	(Thailand) Peeratchai Sukphun (Thailand) Pakkapon Teeraratsakul	(Chinese Taipei) Lai Po-yu (Chinese Taipei) Tsai Fu-cheng
22 August	Future Series Nouvelle-Aquitaine: Host: Pessac, France; Venue: Grand Complexe Sportif de Bellegrave; Level: Future Series; Format: 32MS/32WS/32MD/8WD/32XD	Score: 21–8, 25–23	
22 August	Future Series Nouvelle-Aquitaine: Host: Pessac, France; Venue: Grand Complexe Sportif de Bellegrave; Level: Future Series; Format: 32MS/32WS/32MD/8WD/32XD	(Sweden) Ronak Olyaee (Sweden) Nathalie Wang	(Spain) Beatriz Corrales (Spain) Paula López
22 August	Future Series Nouvelle-Aquitaine: Host: Pessac, France; Venue: Grand Complexe Sportif de Bellegrave; Level: Future Series; Format: 32MS/32WS/32MD/8WD/32XD	Score: 18–21, 21–14, 21–19	
22 August	Future Series Nouvelle-Aquitaine: Host: Pessac, France; Venue: Grand Complexe Sportif de Bellegrave; Level: Future Series; Format: 32MS/32WS/32MD/8WD/32XD	(Denmark) Emil Lauritzen (Denmark) Signe Schulz	(Sweden) Ludwig Axelsson (Sweden) Jessica Silvennoinen
22 August	Future Series Nouvelle-Aquitaine: Host: Pessac, France; Venue: Grand Complexe Sportif de Bellegrave; Level: Future Series; Format: 32MS/32WS/32MD/8WD/32XD	Score: 21–13, 21–19	
29 August	Japan Open (Draw): Host: Osaka, Japan; Venue: Maruzen Intec Arena Osaka; Level: Super 750; Prize: $750,000; Format: 32MS/32WS/32MD/32WD/32XD	(Japan) Kenta Nishimoto	(Chinese Taipei) Chou Tien-chen
29 August	Japan Open (Draw): Host: Osaka, Japan; Venue: Maruzen Intec Arena Osaka; Level: Super 750; Prize: $750,000; Format: 32MS/32WS/32MD/32WD/32XD	Score: 21–19, 21–23, 21–17	
29 August	Japan Open (Draw): Host: Osaka, Japan; Venue: Maruzen Intec Arena Osaka; Level: Super 750; Prize: $750,000; Format: 32MS/32WS/32MD/32WD/32XD	(Japan) Akane Yamaguchi	(South Korea) An Se-young
29 August	Japan Open (Draw): Host: Osaka, Japan; Venue: Maruzen Intec Arena Osaka; Level: Super 750; Prize: $750,000; Format: 32MS/32WS/32MD/32WD/32XD	Score: 21–9, 21–15	
29 August	Japan Open (Draw): Host: Osaka, Japan; Venue: Maruzen Intec Arena Osaka; Level: Super 750; Prize: $750,000; Format: 32MS/32WS/32MD/32WD/32XD	(China) Liang Weikeng (China) Wang Chang	(Denmark) Kim Astrup (Denmark) Anders Skaarup Rasmussen
29 August	Japan Open (Draw): Host: Osaka, Japan; Venue: Maruzen Intec Arena Osaka; Level: Super 750; Prize: $750,000; Format: 32MS/32WS/32MD/32WD/32XD	Score: 21–18, 13–21, 21–17	
29 August	Japan Open (Draw): Host: Osaka, Japan; Venue: Maruzen Intec Arena Osaka; Level: Super 750; Prize: $750,000; Format: 32MS/32WS/32MD/32WD/32XD	(South Korea) Jeong Na-eun (South Korea) Kim Hye-jeong	(South Korea) Baek Ha-na (South Korea) Lee Yu-lim
29 August	Japan Open (Draw): Host: Osaka, Japan; Venue: Maruzen Intec Arena Osaka; Level: Super 750; Prize: $750,000; Format: 32MS/32WS/32MD/32WD/32XD	Score: 23–21, 28–26	
29 August	Japan Open (Draw): Host: Osaka, Japan; Venue: Maruzen Intec Arena Osaka; Level: Super 750; Prize: $750,000; Format: 32MS/32WS/32MD/32WD/32XD	(Thailand) Dechapol Puavaranukroh (Thailand) Sapsiree Taerattanachai	(Japan) Yuta Watanabe (Japan) Arisa Higashino
29 August	Japan Open (Draw): Host: Osaka, Japan; Venue: Maruzen Intec Arena Osaka; Level: Super 750; Prize: $750,000; Format: 32MS/32WS/32MD/32WD/32XD	Score: 16–21, 23–21, 21–18	
29 August	Lagos International (cancelled): Host: Lagos, Nigeria; Venue: Okoya Thomas Hall; Level: International Challenge; Prize: $25,000; Format: 32MS/32WS/32MD/32WD/32XD		
29 August	Lagos International (cancelled): Host: Lagos, Nigeria; Venue: Okoya Thomas Hall; Level: International Challenge; Prize: $25,000; Format: 32MS/32WS/32MD/32WD/32XD	Score:	
29 August	Lagos International (cancelled): Host: Lagos, Nigeria; Venue: Okoya Thomas Hall; Level: International Challenge; Prize: $25,000; Format: 32MS/32WS/32MD/32WD/32XD	Score:	
29 August	Lagos International (cancelled): Host: Lagos, Nigeria; Venue: Okoya Thomas Hall; Level: International Challenge; Prize: $25,000; Format: 32MS/32WS/32MD/32WD/32XD	Score:	
29 August	Lagos International (cancelled): Host: Lagos, Nigeria; Venue: Okoya Thomas Hall; Level: International Challenge; Prize: $25,000; Format: 32MS/32WS/32MD/32WD/32XD	Score:	
29 August	Lagos International (cancelled): Host: Lagos, Nigeria; Venue: Okoya Thomas Hall; Level: International Challenge; Prize: $25,000; Format: 32MS/32WS/32MD/32WD/32XD	Score:	
29 August	Latvia International: Host: Jelgava, Latvia; Venue: Zemgales Olimpiskais centrs; Level: Future Series; Format: 32MS/32WS/32MD/32WD/32XD	(Italy) Christopher Vittoriani	(Chinese Taipei) Tsai Cheng-han
29 August	Latvia International: Host: Jelgava, Latvia; Venue: Zemgales Olimpiskais centrs; Level: Future Series; Format: 32MS/32WS/32MD/32WD/32XD	Score: 21–18, 21–15	
29 August	Latvia International: Host: Jelgava, Latvia; Venue: Zemgales Olimpiskais centrs; Level: Future Series; Format: 32MS/32WS/32MD/32WD/32XD	(Chinese Taipei) Wang Pei-yu	(France) Anna Tatranova
29 August	Latvia International: Host: Jelgava, Latvia; Venue: Zemgales Olimpiskais centrs; Level: Future Series; Format: 32MS/32WS/32MD/32WD/32XD	Score: Walkover	
29 August	Latvia International: Host: Jelgava, Latvia; Venue: Zemgales Olimpiskais centrs; Level: Future Series; Format: 32MS/32WS/32MD/32WD/32XD	(Chinese Taipei) Lai Po-yu (Chinese Taipei) Tsai Fu-cheng	(Poland) Michal Sobolewski (Poland) Adam Szolc
29 August	Latvia International: Host: Jelgava, Latvia; Venue: Zemgales Olimpiskais centrs; Level: Future Series; Format: 32MS/32WS/32MD/32WD/32XD	Score: 21–8, 21–7	
29 August	Latvia International: Host: Jelgava, Latvia; Venue: Zemgales Olimpiskais centrs; Level: Future Series; Format: 32MS/32WS/32MD/32WD/32XD	(Estonia) Kati-Kreet Marran (Estonia) Helina Rüütel	(Poland) Dominika Kwasnik (Poland) Kornelia Marczak
29 August	Latvia International: Host: Jelgava, Latvia; Venue: Zemgales Olimpiskais centrs; Level: Future Series; Format: 32MS/32WS/32MD/32WD/32XD	Score: 20–22, 21–14, 21–16	
29 August	Latvia International: Host: Jelgava, Latvia; Venue: Zemgales Olimpiskais centrs; Level: Future Series; Format: 32MS/32WS/32MD/32WD/32XD	(Denmark) Emil Lauritzen (Denmark) Signe Schulz	(France) Enogat Roy (France) Anna Tatranova
29 August	Latvia International: Host: Jelgava, Latvia; Venue: Zemgales Olimpiskais centrs; Level: Future Series; Format: 32MS/32WS/32MD/32WD/32XD	Score: 21–11, 21–8	
29 August	Mexico Future Series: Host: Mexico City, Mexico; Venue: Club France; Level: Future Series; Format: 32MS/32WS/32MD/8WD/16XD	(Mexico) Luis Montoya	(Mexico) Job Castillo
29 August	Mexico Future Series: Host: Mexico City, Mexico; Venue: Club France; Level: Future Series; Format: 32MS/32WS/32MD/8WD/16XD	Score: 21–16, 10–21, 22–20	
29 August	Mexico Future Series: Host: Mexico City, Mexico; Venue: Club France; Level: Future Series; Format: 32MS/32WS/32MD/8WD/16XD	(United States) Sanchita Pandey	(Mexico) Vanessa García
29 August	Mexico Future Series: Host: Mexico City, Mexico; Venue: Club France; Level: Future Series; Format: 32MS/32WS/32MD/8WD/16XD	Score: 21–19, 21–15	
29 August	Mexico Future Series: Host: Mexico City, Mexico; Venue: Club France; Level: Future Series; Format: 32MS/32WS/32MD/8WD/16XD	(England) Kern Pong Lap Kan (England) Larry Pong	(Mexico) Job Castillo (Mexico) Luis Montoya
29 August	Mexico Future Series: Host: Mexico City, Mexico; Venue: Club France; Level: Future Series; Format: 32MS/32WS/32MD/8WD/16XD	Score: 21–23, 24–22, 22–20	
29 August	Mexico Future Series: Host: Mexico City, Mexico; Venue: Club France; Level: Future Series; Format: 32MS/32WS/32MD/8WD/16XD	(Mexico) Paula Lozoya (Mexico) Fátima Río	(Mexico) Sofia Claudio (Mexico) Cristina Pérez
29 August	Mexico Future Series: Host: Mexico City, Mexico; Venue: Club France; Level: Future Series; Format: 32MS/32WS/32MD/8WD/16XD	Score: 21–17, 21–10	
29 August	Mexico Future Series: Host: Mexico City, Mexico; Venue: Club France; Level: Future Series; Format: 32MS/32WS/32MD/8WD/16XD	(United States) Ryan Zheng (United States) Sanchita Pandey	(United States) Kelvin Chong (United States) Katelin Ngo
29 August	Mexico Future Series: Host: Mexico City, Mexico; Venue: Club France; Level: Future Series; Format: 32MS/32WS/32MD/8WD/16XD	Score: 21–9, 21–18	

=== September ===
Week commencing	Tournament	Champions	Runners-up
5 September	Ukraine International (postponed): Host: Kharkiv, Ukraine; Venue: Lokomotyv Sports Palace; Level: International Series; Prize: $5,000; Format: 32MS/32WS/32MD/16WD/32XD		
5 September	Ukraine International (postponed): Host: Kharkiv, Ukraine; Venue: Lokomotyv Sports Palace; Level: International Series; Prize: $5,000; Format: 32MS/32WS/32MD/16WD/32XD	Score:	
5 September	Ukraine International (postponed): Host: Kharkiv, Ukraine; Venue: Lokomotyv Sports Palace; Level: International Series; Prize: $5,000; Format: 32MS/32WS/32MD/16WD/32XD	Score:	
5 September	Ukraine International (postponed): Host: Kharkiv, Ukraine; Venue: Lokomotyv Sports Palace; Level: International Series; Prize: $5,000; Format: 32MS/32WS/32MD/16WD/32XD	Score:	
5 September	Ukraine International (postponed): Host: Kharkiv, Ukraine; Venue: Lokomotyv Sports Palace; Level: International Series; Prize: $5,000; Format: 32MS/32WS/32MD/16WD/32XD	Score:	
5 September	Ukraine International (postponed): Host: Kharkiv, Ukraine; Venue: Lokomotyv Sports Palace; Level: International Series; Prize: $5,000; Format: 32MS/32WS/32MD/16WD/32XD	Score:	
5 September	Benin International: Host: Ouidah, Benin; Venue: Gymnase Institut Régional de Santé Publique; Level: Future Series; Format: 32MS/32WS/32MD/16WD/32XD	(Malaysia) Ong Zhen Yi	(Jordan) Bahaedeen Ahmad Alshannik
5 September	Benin International: Host: Ouidah, Benin; Venue: Gymnase Institut Régional de Santé Publique; Level: Future Series; Format: 32MS/32WS/32MD/16WD/32XD	Score: 21–10, 19–21, 21–12	
5 September	Benin International: Host: Ouidah, Benin; Venue: Gymnase Institut Régional de Santé Publique; Level: Future Series; Format: 32MS/32WS/32MD/16WD/32XD	(Malaysia) Loh Zhi Wei	(Malaysia) Joanne Ng
5 September	Benin International: Host: Ouidah, Benin; Venue: Gymnase Institut Régional de Santé Publique; Level: Future Series; Format: 32MS/32WS/32MD/16WD/32XD	Score: 21–19, 21–16	
5 September	Benin International: Host: Ouidah, Benin; Venue: Gymnase Institut Régional de Santé Publique; Level: Future Series; Format: 32MS/32WS/32MD/16WD/32XD	(Philippines) Christian Bernardo (Philippines) Alvin Morada	(Nigeria) Saddam Sidi Rufai (Nigeria) Khalil Safana Shamsuddeen
5 September	Benin International: Host: Ouidah, Benin; Venue: Gymnase Institut Régional de Santé Publique; Level: Future Series; Format: 32MS/32WS/32MD/16WD/32XD	Score: 21–9, 21–12	
5 September	Benin International: Host: Ouidah, Benin; Venue: Gymnase Institut Régional de Santé Publique; Level: Future Series; Format: 32MS/32WS/32MD/16WD/32XD	(Philippines) Alyssa Leonardo (Philippines) Thea Pomar	(Egypt) Jana Abdelkader (Egypt) Nour Ahmed Youssri
5 September	Benin International: Host: Ouidah, Benin; Venue: Gymnase Institut Régional de Santé Publique; Level: Future Series; Format: 32MS/32WS/32MD/16WD/32XD	Score: 21–13, 21–7	
5 September	Benin International: Host: Ouidah, Benin; Venue: Gymnase Institut Régional de Santé Publique; Level: Future Series; Format: 32MS/32WS/32MD/16WD/32XD	(Philippines) Alvin Morada (Philippines) Alyssa Leonardo	(Philippines) Christian Bernardo (Philippines) Thea Pomar
5 September	Benin International: Host: Ouidah, Benin; Venue: Gymnase Institut Régional de Santé Publique; Level: Future Series; Format: 32MS/32WS/32MD/16WD/32XD	Score: 21–13, 18–21, 21–17	
12 September	2022 Asian Games (Draw) (postponed): Host: Hangzhou, China; Venue: TBD; Level: Multisport; Format: TBD MT / TBD WT		
12 September	2022 Asian Games (Draw) (postponed): Host: Hangzhou, China; Venue: TBD; Level: Multisport; Format: TBD MT / TBD WT	Score:	
12 September	2022 Asian Games (Draw) (postponed): Host: Hangzhou, China; Venue: TBD; Level: Multisport; Format: TBD MT / TBD WT	Score:	
12 September	India Maharashtra International Challenge: Host: Nagpur, India; Venue: Divisional Sports Complex; Level: International Challenge; Prize: $15,000; Format: 64MS/64WS/32MD/32WD/32XD	(India) Meiraba Luwang Maisnam	(India) Mithun Manjunath
12 September	India Maharashtra International Challenge: Host: Nagpur, India; Venue: Divisional Sports Complex; Level: International Challenge; Prize: $15,000; Format: 64MS/64WS/32MD/32WD/32XD	Score: 21–14, 21–16	
12 September	India Maharashtra International Challenge: Host: Nagpur, India; Venue: Divisional Sports Complex; Level: International Challenge; Prize: $15,000; Format: 64MS/64WS/32MD/32WD/32XD	(Japan) Miho Kayama	(India) Gadde Ruthvika Shivani
12 September	India Maharashtra International Challenge: Host: Nagpur, India; Venue: Divisional Sports Complex; Level: International Challenge; Prize: $15,000; Format: 64MS/64WS/32MD/32WD/32XD	Score: 21–11, 21–11	
12 September	India Maharashtra International Challenge: Host: Nagpur, India; Venue: Divisional Sports Complex; Level: International Challenge; Prize: $15,000; Format: 64MS/64WS/32MD/32WD/32XD	(India) Arjun M. R. (India) Dhruv Kapila	(Thailand) Chaloempon Charoenkitamorn (Thailand) Nanthakarn Yordphaisong
12 September	India Maharashtra International Challenge: Host: Nagpur, India; Venue: Divisional Sports Complex; Level: International Challenge; Prize: $15,000; Format: 64MS/64WS/32MD/32WD/32XD	Score: 21–17, 20–22, 21–18	
12 September	India Maharashtra International Challenge: Host: Nagpur, India; Venue: Divisional Sports Complex; Level: International Challenge; Prize: $15,000; Format: 64MS/64WS/32MD/32WD/32XD	(Japan) Chisato Hoshi (Japan) Miyu Takahashi	(Japan) Miho Kayama (Japan) Kaho Osawa
12 September	India Maharashtra International Challenge: Host: Nagpur, India; Venue: Divisional Sports Complex; Level: International Challenge; Prize: $15,000; Format: 64MS/64WS/32MD/32WD/32XD	Score: 21–18, 19–21, 21–16	
12 September	India Maharashtra International Challenge: Host: Nagpur, India; Venue: Divisional Sports Complex; Level: International Challenge; Prize: $15,000; Format: 64MS/64WS/32MD/32WD/32XD	(Thailand) Ruttanapak Oupthong (Thailand) Jhenicha Sudjaipraparat	(India) Gouse Shaik (India) K. Maneesha
12 September	India Maharashtra International Challenge: Host: Nagpur, India; Venue: Divisional Sports Complex; Level: International Challenge; Prize: $15,000; Format: 64MS/64WS/32MD/32WD/32XD	Score: 21–18, 21–9	
12 September	Belgian International: Host: Leuven, Belgium; Venue: Sportoase Philipssite Leuven; Level: International Challenge; Prize: $25,000; Format: 32MS/32WS/32MD/32WD/32XD	(Chinese Taipei) Lin Chun-yi	(Denmark) Kim Bruun
12 September	Belgian International: Host: Leuven, Belgium; Venue: Sportoase Philipssite Leuven; Level: International Challenge; Prize: $25,000; Format: 32MS/32WS/32MD/32WD/32XD	Score: 21–14, 21–13	
12 September	Belgian International: Host: Leuven, Belgium; Venue: Sportoase Philipssite Leuven; Level: International Challenge; Prize: $25,000; Format: 32MS/32WS/32MD/32WD/32XD	(Vietnam) Nguyễn Thùy Linh	(Japan) Hirari Mizui
12 September	Belgian International: Host: Leuven, Belgium; Venue: Sportoase Philipssite Leuven; Level: International Challenge; Prize: $25,000; Format: 32MS/32WS/32MD/32WD/32XD	Score: 21–19, 21–16	
12 September	Belgian International: Host: Leuven, Belgium; Venue: Sportoase Philipssite Leuven; Level: International Challenge; Prize: $25,000; Format: 32MS/32WS/32MD/32WD/32XD	(Chinese Taipei) Chang Ko-chi (Chinese Taipei) Po Li-wei	(Thailand) Sirawit Sothon (Thailand) Natthapat Trinkajee
12 September	Belgian International: Host: Leuven, Belgium; Venue: Sportoase Philipssite Leuven; Level: International Challenge; Prize: $25,000; Format: 32MS/32WS/32MD/32WD/32XD	Score: 21–11, 19–21, 21–17	
12 September	Belgian International: Host: Leuven, Belgium; Venue: Sportoase Philipssite Leuven; Level: International Challenge; Prize: $25,000; Format: 32MS/32WS/32MD/32WD/32XD	(Japan) Rui Hirokami (Japan) Yuna Kato	(Chinese Taipei) Chang Ching-hui (Chinese Taipei) Yang Ching-tun
12 September	Belgian International: Host: Leuven, Belgium; Venue: Sportoase Philipssite Leuven; Level: International Challenge; Prize: $25,000; Format: 32MS/32WS/32MD/32WD/32XD	Score: 21–7, 21–15	
12 September	Belgian International: Host: Leuven, Belgium; Venue: Sportoase Philipssite Leuven; Level: International Challenge; Prize: $25,000; Format: 32MS/32WS/32MD/32WD/32XD	(Japan) Hiroki Midorikawa (Japan) Natsu Saito	(Chinese Taipei) Chiu Hsiang-chieh (Chinese Taipei) Lin Xiao-min
12 September	Belgian International: Host: Leuven, Belgium; Venue: Sportoase Philipssite Leuven; Level: International Challenge; Prize: $25,000; Format: 32MS/32WS/32MD/32WD/32XD	Score: 21–13, 21–17	
12 September	Brazil International Series: Host: Teresina, Piauí, Brazil; Venue: Centro de Treinamento da CBBd; Level: International Series; Prize: $5,000; Format: 32MS/32WS/32MD/16WD/32XD	(El Salvador) Uriel Canjura	(Portugal) Bernardo Atilano
12 September	Brazil International Series: Host: Teresina, Piauí, Brazil; Venue: Centro de Treinamento da CBBd; Level: International Series; Prize: $5,000; Format: 32MS/32WS/32MD/16WD/32XD	Score: 21–17, 21–15	
12 September	Brazil International Series: Host: Teresina, Piauí, Brazil; Venue: Centro de Treinamento da CBBd; Level: International Series; Prize: $5,000; Format: 32MS/32WS/32MD/16WD/32XD	(Brazil) Juliana Viana Vieira	(Mexico) Vanessa García
12 September	Brazil International Series: Host: Teresina, Piauí, Brazil; Venue: Centro de Treinamento da CBBd; Level: International Series; Prize: $5,000; Format: 32MS/32WS/32MD/16WD/32XD	Score: 21–13, 21–14	
12 September	Brazil International Series: Host: Teresina, Piauí, Brazil; Venue: Centro de Treinamento da CBBd; Level: International Series; Prize: $5,000; Format: 32MS/32WS/32MD/16WD/32XD	(Brazil) Fabricio Farias (Brazil) Francielton Farias	(Guatemala) Jonathan Solís (Guatemala) Aníbal Marroquín
12 September	Brazil International Series: Host: Teresina, Piauí, Brazil; Venue: Centro de Treinamento da CBBd; Level: International Series; Prize: $5,000; Format: 32MS/32WS/32MD/16WD/32XD	Score: 21–12, 21–17	
12 September	Brazil International Series: Host: Teresina, Piauí, Brazil; Venue: Centro de Treinamento da CBBd; Level: International Series; Prize: $5,000; Format: 32MS/32WS/32MD/16WD/32XD	(Brazil) Jaqueline Lima (Brazil) Sâmia Lima	(Guatemala) Diana Corleto (Guatemala) Nikté Sotomayor
12 September	Brazil International Series: Host: Teresina, Piauí, Brazil; Venue: Centro de Treinamento da CBBd; Level: International Series; Prize: $5,000; Format: 32MS/32WS/32MD/16WD/32XD	Score: 21–16, 23–21	
12 September	Brazil International Series: Host: Teresina, Piauí, Brazil; Venue: Centro de Treinamento da CBBd; Level: International Series; Prize: $5,000; Format: 32MS/32WS/32MD/16WD/32XD	(Guatemala) Jonathan Solís (Guatemala) Diana Corleto	(Brazil) Matheus Voigt (Brazil) Tamires Santos
12 September	Brazil International Series: Host: Teresina, Piauí, Brazil; Venue: Centro de Treinamento da CBBd; Level: International Series; Prize: $5,000; Format: 32MS/32WS/32MD/16WD/32XD	Score: 21–17, 21–18	
12 September	Spanish International: Host: Ibiza, Spain; Venue: Polideportivo Blancadona; Level: Future Series; Prize: $15,000; Format: 32MS/32WS/32MD/32WD/32XD	(Denmark) Victor Ørding Kauffmann	(Italy) Christopher Vittoriani
12 September	Spanish International: Host: Ibiza, Spain; Venue: Polideportivo Blancadona; Level: Future Series; Prize: $15,000; Format: 32MS/32WS/32MD/32WD/32XD	Score: 21–13, 21–7	
12 September	Spanish International: Host: Ibiza, Spain; Venue: Polideportivo Blancadona; Level: Future Series; Prize: $15,000; Format: 32MS/32WS/32MD/32WD/32XD	(Denmark) Laura Fløj Thomsen	(Switzerland) Dounia Pelupessy
12 September	Spanish International: Host: Ibiza, Spain; Venue: Polideportivo Blancadona; Level: Future Series; Prize: $15,000; Format: 32MS/32WS/32MD/32WD/32XD	Score: 21–13, 21–18	
12 September	Spanish International: Host: Ibiza, Spain; Venue: Polideportivo Blancadona; Level: Future Series; Prize: $15,000; Format: 32MS/32WS/32MD/32WD/32XD	(Netherlands) Noah Haase (Bulgaria) Alex Vlaar	(Spain) Joan Monroy (Spain) Carlos Piris
12 September	Spanish International: Host: Ibiza, Spain; Venue: Polideportivo Blancadona; Level: Future Series; Prize: $15,000; Format: 32MS/32WS/32MD/32WD/32XD	Score: 21–18, 21–17	
12 September	Spanish International: Host: Ibiza, Spain; Venue: Polideportivo Blancadona; Level: Future Series; Prize: $15,000; Format: 32MS/32WS/32MD/32WD/32XD	(Denmark) Lærke Hvid (Denmark) Emilia Nesic	(Denmark) Anne Fuglsang (Denmark) Frederikke Toft
12 September	Spanish International: Host: Ibiza, Spain; Venue: Polideportivo Blancadona; Level: Future Series; Prize: $15,000; Format: 32MS/32WS/32MD/32WD/32XD	Score: 21–14, 21–19	
12 September	Spanish International: Host: Ibiza, Spain; Venue: Polideportivo Blancadona; Level: Future Series; Prize: $15,000; Format: 32MS/32WS/32MD/32WD/32XD	(England) Jonty Russ (England) Sian Kelly	(France) Enogat Roy (France) Anna Tatranova
12 September	Spanish International: Host: Ibiza, Spain; Venue: Polideportivo Blancadona; Level: Future Series; Prize: $15,000; Format: 32MS/32WS/32MD/32WD/32XD	Score: 21–19, 21–13	
19 September	2022 Asian Games (Draw) (postponed): Host: Hangzhou, China; Venue: TBD; Level: Multisport; Format: 32MS/32WS/32MD/32WD/32XD		
19 September	2022 Asian Games (Draw) (postponed): Host: Hangzhou, China; Venue: TBD; Level: Multisport; Format: 32MS/32WS/32MD/32WD/32XD	Score:	
19 September	2022 Asian Games (Draw) (postponed): Host: Hangzhou, China; Venue: TBD; Level: Multisport; Format: 32MS/32WS/32MD/32WD/32XD	Score:	
19 September	2022 Asian Games (Draw) (postponed): Host: Hangzhou, China; Venue: TBD; Level: Multisport; Format: 32MS/32WS/32MD/32WD/32XD	Score:	
19 September	2022 Asian Games (Draw) (postponed): Host: Hangzhou, China; Venue: TBD; Level: Multisport; Format: 32MS/32WS/32MD/32WD/32XD	Score:	
19 September	2022 Asian Games (Draw) (postponed): Host: Hangzhou, China; Venue: TBD; Level: Multisport; Format: 32MS/32WS/32MD/32WD/32XD	Score:	
19 September	India Chhattisgarh International Challenge: Host: Raipur, India; Venue: Isportz Badminton Arena; Level: International Challenge; Prize: $15,000; Format: 64MS/64WS/32MD/32WD/32XD	(India) Priyanshu Rajawat	(India) Subhankar Dey
19 September	India Chhattisgarh International Challenge: Host: Raipur, India; Venue: Isportz Badminton Arena; Level: International Challenge; Prize: $15,000; Format: 64MS/64WS/32MD/32WD/32XD	Score: 21–13, 21–11	
19 September	India Chhattisgarh International Challenge: Host: Raipur, India; Venue: Isportz Badminton Arena; Level: International Challenge; Prize: $15,000; Format: 64MS/64WS/32MD/32WD/32XD	(India) Tasnim Mir	(India) Samiya Imad Farooqui
19 September	India Chhattisgarh International Challenge: Host: Raipur, India; Venue: Isportz Badminton Arena; Level: International Challenge; Prize: $15,000; Format: 64MS/64WS/32MD/32WD/32XD	Score: 14–21, 21–17, 21–11	
19 September	India Chhattisgarh International Challenge: Host: Raipur, India; Venue: Isportz Badminton Arena; Level: International Challenge; Prize: $15,000; Format: 64MS/64WS/32MD/32WD/32XD	(India) Ishaan Bhatnagar (India) K. Sai Pratheek	(India) Krishna Prasad Garaga (India) Vishnuvardhan Goud Panjala
19 September	India Chhattisgarh International Challenge: Host: Raipur, India; Venue: Isportz Badminton Arena; Level: International Challenge; Prize: $15,000; Format: 64MS/64WS/32MD/32WD/32XD	Score: 17–21, 21–15, 23–21	
19 September	India Chhattisgarh International Challenge: Host: Raipur, India; Venue: Isportz Badminton Arena; Level: International Challenge; Prize: $15,000; Format: 64MS/64WS/32MD/32WD/32XD	(Japan) Chisato Hoshi (Japan) Miyu Takahashi	(India) Pooja Dandu (India) Arathi Sara Sunil
19 September	India Chhattisgarh International Challenge: Host: Raipur, India; Venue: Isportz Badminton Arena; Level: International Challenge; Prize: $15,000; Format: 64MS/64WS/32MD/32WD/32XD	Score: 12–21, 21–12, 21–7	
19 September	India Chhattisgarh International Challenge: Host: Raipur, India; Venue: Isportz Badminton Arena; Level: International Challenge; Prize: $15,000; Format: 64MS/64WS/32MD/32WD/32XD	(India) Rohan Kapoor (India) N. Sikki Reddy	(Thailand) Ratchapol Makkasasithorn (Thailand) Chasinee Korepap
19 September	India Chhattisgarh International Challenge: Host: Raipur, India; Venue: Isportz Badminton Arena; Level: International Challenge; Prize: $15,000; Format: 64MS/64WS/32MD/32WD/32XD	Score: 22–20, 23–21	
19 September	Indonesia International Series: Host: Yogyakarta, Indonesia; Venue: Among Rogo Sports Hall; Level: International Series; Prize: $5,000; Format: 64MS/32WS/64MD/32WD/32XD	(Indonesia) Ikhsan Rumbay	(Indonesia) Iqbal Diaz Syahputra
19 September	Indonesia International Series: Host: Yogyakarta, Indonesia; Venue: Among Rogo Sports Hall; Level: International Series; Prize: $5,000; Format: 64MS/32WS/64MD/32WD/32XD	Score: 22–20, 21–15	
19 September	Indonesia International Series: Host: Yogyakarta, Indonesia; Venue: Among Rogo Sports Hall; Level: International Series; Prize: $5,000; Format: 64MS/32WS/64MD/32WD/32XD	(Indonesia) Mutiara Ayu Puspitasari	(Indonesia) Stephanie Widjaja
19 September	Indonesia International Series: Host: Yogyakarta, Indonesia; Venue: Among Rogo Sports Hall; Level: International Series; Prize: $5,000; Format: 64MS/32WS/64MD/32WD/32XD	Score: 15–21, 21–10, 22–20	
19 September	Indonesia International Series: Host: Yogyakarta, Indonesia; Venue: Among Rogo Sports Hall; Level: International Series; Prize: $5,000; Format: 64MS/32WS/64MD/32WD/32XD	(Indonesia) Alfian Eko Prasetya (Indonesia) Ade Yusuf Santoso	(Indonesia) Reinard Dhanriano (Indonesia) Kenas Adi Haryanto
19 September	Indonesia International Series: Host: Yogyakarta, Indonesia; Venue: Among Rogo Sports Hall; Level: International Series; Prize: $5,000; Format: 64MS/32WS/64MD/32WD/32XD	Score: 21–16, 18–21, 21–16	
19 September	Indonesia International Series: Host: Yogyakarta, Indonesia; Venue: Among Rogo Sports Hall; Level: International Series; Prize: $5,000; Format: 64MS/32WS/64MD/32WD/32XD	(Indonesia) Ririn Amelia (Indonesia) Virni Putri	(Indonesia) Ridya Aulia Fatasya (Indonesia) Kelly Larissa
19 September	Indonesia International Series: Host: Yogyakarta, Indonesia; Venue: Among Rogo Sports Hall; Level: International Series; Prize: $5,000; Format: 64MS/32WS/64MD/32WD/32XD	Score: 18–21, 21–13, 21–18	
19 September	Indonesia International Series: Host: Yogyakarta, Indonesia; Venue: Among Rogo Sports Hall; Level: International Series; Prize: $5,000; Format: 64MS/32WS/64MD/32WD/32XD	(Indonesia) Dejan Ferdinansyah (Indonesia) Gloria Emanuelle Widjaja	(Indonesia) Muhammad Reza Pahlevi Isfahani (Indonesia) Melati Daeva Oktavianti
19 September	Indonesia International Series: Host: Yogyakarta, Indonesia; Venue: Among Rogo Sports Hall; Level: International Series; Prize: $5,000; Format: 64MS/32WS/64MD/32WD/32XD	Score: 19–21, 21–9, 23–21	
19 September	Polish International: Host: Lublin, Poland; Venue: Hala sportowo-widowiskowa Uniwersytetu Medycznego w Lublinie; Level: International Series; Prize: $5,000; Format: 32MS/32WS/32MD/32WD/32XD	(Japan) Yushi Tanaka	(Czech Republic) Jan Louda
19 September	Polish International: Host: Lublin, Poland; Venue: Hala sportowo-widowiskowa Uniwersytetu Medycznego w Lublinie; Level: International Series; Prize: $5,000; Format: 32MS/32WS/32MD/32WD/32XD	Score: 21–13, 21–15	
19 September	Polish International: Host: Lublin, Poland; Venue: Hala sportowo-widowiskowa Uniwersytetu Medycznego w Lublinie; Level: International Series; Prize: $5,000; Format: 32MS/32WS/32MD/32WD/32XD	(Japan) Hirari Mizui	(China) Qiu Ziying
19 September	Polish International: Host: Lublin, Poland; Venue: Hala sportowo-widowiskowa Uniwersytetu Medycznego w Lublinie; Level: International Series; Prize: $5,000; Format: 32MS/32WS/32MD/32WD/32XD	Score: 18–21, 21–11, 21–14	
19 September	Polish International: Host: Lublin, Poland; Venue: Hala sportowo-widowiskowa Uniwersytetu Medycznego w Lublinie; Level: International Series; Prize: $5,000; Format: 32MS/32WS/32MD/32WD/32XD	(Chinese Taipei) Chiu Hsiang-chieh (Chinese Taipei) Yang Ming-tse	(Japan) Masato Takano (Japan) Katsuki Tamate
19 September	Polish International: Host: Lublin, Poland; Venue: Hala sportowo-widowiskowa Uniwersytetu Medycznego w Lublinie; Level: International Series; Prize: $5,000; Format: 32MS/32WS/32MD/32WD/32XD	Score: 21–11, 21–15	
19 September	Polish International: Host: Lublin, Poland; Venue: Hala sportowo-widowiskowa Uniwersytetu Medycznego w Lublinie; Level: International Series; Prize: $5,000; Format: 32MS/32WS/32MD/32WD/32XD	(Japan) Miku Shigeta (Japan) Yui Suizu	(Chinese Taipei) Sung Shuo-yun (Chinese Taipei) Yu Chien-hui
19 September	Polish International: Host: Lublin, Poland; Venue: Hala sportowo-widowiskowa Uniwersytetu Medycznego w Lublinie; Level: International Series; Prize: $5,000; Format: 32MS/32WS/32MD/32WD/32XD	Score: 21–18, 21–18	
19 September	Polish International: Host: Lublin, Poland; Venue: Hala sportowo-widowiskowa Uniwersytetu Medycznego w Lublinie; Level: International Series; Prize: $5,000; Format: 32MS/32WS/32MD/32WD/32XD	(Chinese Taipei) Chiu Hsiang-chieh (Chinese Taipei) Lin Xiao-min	(Chinese Taipei) Lu Ming-che (Chinese Taipei) Chung Kan-yu
19 September	Polish International: Host: Lublin, Poland; Venue: Hala sportowo-widowiskowa Uniwersytetu Medycznego w Lublinie; Level: International Series; Prize: $5,000; Format: 32MS/32WS/32MD/32WD/32XD	Score: 21–16, 21–18	
19 September	Venezuela Future Series (cancelled) (Note: This tournament, originally to be played on 21–25 September, was later cancelled due to the COVID-19 pandemic in Venezuela.): Host: Caracas, Venezuela; Venue: Gimnasio Cubierto AMEB; Level: Future Series; Format: 32MS/32WS/32MD/16WD/32XD		
19 September	Venezuela Future Series (cancelled): Host: Caracas, Venezuela; Venue: Gimnasio Cubierto AMEB; Level: Future Series; Format: 32MS/32WS/32MD/16WD/32XD	Score:	
19 September	Venezuela Future Series (cancelled): Host: Caracas, Venezuela; Venue: Gimnasio Cubierto AMEB; Level: Future Series; Format: 32MS/32WS/32MD/16WD/32XD	Score:	
19 September	Venezuela Future Series (cancelled): Host: Caracas, Venezuela; Venue: Gimnasio Cubierto AMEB; Level: Future Series; Format: 32MS/32WS/32MD/16WD/32XD	Score:	
19 September	Venezuela Future Series (cancelled): Host: Caracas, Venezuela; Venue: Gimnasio Cubierto AMEB; Level: Future Series; Format: 32MS/32WS/32MD/16WD/32XD	Score:	
19 September	Venezuela Future Series (cancelled): Host: Caracas, Venezuela; Venue: Gimnasio Cubierto AMEB; Level: Future Series; Format: 32MS/32WS/32MD/16WD/32XD	Score:	
26 September	Vietnam Open (Draw): Host: Ho Chi Minh City, Vietnam; Venue: Nguyen Du Stadium; Level: Super 100; Prize: $75,000; Format: 64MS/32WS/32MD/32WD/32XD	(Japan) Kodai Naraoka	(China) Sun Feixiang
26 September	Vietnam Open (Draw): Host: Ho Chi Minh City, Vietnam; Venue: Nguyen Du Stadium; Level: Super 100; Prize: $75,000; Format: 64MS/32WS/32MD/32WD/32XD	Score: 10–21, 21–14, 21–17	
26 September	Vietnam Open (Draw): Host: Ho Chi Minh City, Vietnam; Venue: Nguyen Du Stadium; Level: Super 100; Prize: $75,000; Format: 64MS/32WS/32MD/32WD/32XD	(Vietnam) Nguyễn Thùy Linh	(Malaysia) Goh Jin Wei
26 September	Vietnam Open (Draw): Host: Ho Chi Minh City, Vietnam; Venue: Nguyen Du Stadium; Level: Super 100; Prize: $75,000; Format: 64MS/32WS/32MD/32WD/32XD	Score: 21–15, 21–13	
26 September	Vietnam Open (Draw): Host: Ho Chi Minh City, Vietnam; Venue: Nguyen Du Stadium; Level: Super 100; Prize: $75,000; Format: 64MS/32WS/32MD/32WD/32XD	(China) Ren Xiangyu (China) Tan Qiang	(China) He Jiting (China) Zhou Haodong
26 September	Vietnam Open (Draw): Host: Ho Chi Minh City, Vietnam; Venue: Nguyen Du Stadium; Level: Super 100; Prize: $75,000; Format: 64MS/32WS/32MD/32WD/32XD	Score: 17–21, 21–18, 21–8	
26 September	Vietnam Open (Draw): Host: Ho Chi Minh City, Vietnam; Venue: Nguyen Du Stadium; Level: Super 100; Prize: $75,000; Format: 64MS/32WS/32MD/32WD/32XD	(Thailand) Benyapa Aimsaard (Thailand) Nuntakarn Aimsaard	(Indonesia) Febriana Dwipuji Kusuma (Indonesia) Amalia Cahaya Pratiwi
26 September	Vietnam Open (Draw): Host: Ho Chi Minh City, Vietnam; Venue: Nguyen Du Stadium; Level: Super 100; Prize: $75,000; Format: 64MS/32WS/32MD/32WD/32XD	Score: 21–16, 27–25	
26 September	Vietnam Open (Draw): Host: Ho Chi Minh City, Vietnam; Venue: Nguyen Du Stadium; Level: Super 100; Prize: $75,000; Format: 64MS/32WS/32MD/32WD/32XD	(Indonesia) Dejan Ferdinansyah (Indonesia) Gloria Emanuelle Widjaja	(Indonesia) Rehan Naufal Kusharjanto (Indonesia) Lisa Ayu Kusumawati
26 September	Vietnam Open (Draw): Host: Ho Chi Minh City, Vietnam; Venue: Nguyen Du Stadium; Level: Super 100; Prize: $75,000; Format: 64MS/32WS/32MD/32WD/32XD	Score: 21–13, 21–18	
26 September	Canada Open (Draw): Host: Calgary, Canada; Venue: Markin MacPhail Centre; Level: Super 100; Prize: $75,000; Format: 64MS/32WS/32MD/32WD/32XD	(France) Alex Lanier	(Japan) Takuma Obayashi
26 September	Canada Open (Draw): Host: Calgary, Canada; Venue: Markin MacPhail Centre; Level: Super 100; Prize: $75,000; Format: 64MS/32WS/32MD/32WD/32XD	Score: 21–12, 12–21, 21–13	
26 September	Canada Open (Draw): Host: Calgary, Canada; Venue: Markin MacPhail Centre; Level: Super 100; Prize: $75,000; Format: 64MS/32WS/32MD/32WD/32XD	(Canada) Michelle Li	(Chinese Taipei) Sung Shuo-yun
26 September	Canada Open (Draw): Host: Calgary, Canada; Venue: Markin MacPhail Centre; Level: Super 100; Prize: $75,000; Format: 64MS/32WS/32MD/32WD/32XD	Score: 21–16, 21–15	
26 September	Canada Open (Draw): Host: Calgary, Canada; Venue: Markin MacPhail Centre; Level: Super 100; Prize: $75,000; Format: 64MS/32WS/32MD/32WD/32XD	(Japan) Ayato Endo (Japan) Yuta Takei	(Japan) Takuto Inoue (Japan) Kenya Mitsuhashi
26 September	Canada Open (Draw): Host: Calgary, Canada; Venue: Markin MacPhail Centre; Level: Super 100; Prize: $75,000; Format: 64MS/32WS/32MD/32WD/32XD	Score: 21–15, 21–8	
26 September	Canada Open (Draw): Host: Calgary, Canada; Venue: Markin MacPhail Centre; Level: Super 100; Prize: $75,000; Format: 64MS/32WS/32MD/32WD/32XD	(Japan) Rena Miyaura (Japan) Ayako Sakuramoto	(Japan) Rui Hirokami (Japan) Yuna Kato
26 September	Canada Open (Draw): Host: Calgary, Canada; Venue: Markin MacPhail Centre; Level: Super 100; Prize: $75,000; Format: 64MS/32WS/32MD/32WD/32XD	Score: 21–13, 21–8	
26 September	Canada Open (Draw): Host: Calgary, Canada; Venue: Markin MacPhail Centre; Level: Super 100; Prize: $75,000; Format: 64MS/32WS/32MD/32WD/32XD	(Chinese Taipei) Ye Hong-wei (Chinese Taipei) Lee Chia-hsin	(Japan) Hiroki Midorikawa (Japan) Natsu Saito
26 September	Canada Open (Draw): Host: Calgary, Canada; Venue: Markin MacPhail Centre; Level: Super 100; Prize: $75,000; Format: 64MS/32WS/32MD/32WD/32XD	Score: 12–21, 21–12, 21–15	
26 September	Yogyakarta Indonesia International Challenge: Host: Yogyakarta, Indonesia; Venue: Among Rogo Sports Hall; Level: International Challenge; Prize: $15,000; Format: 64MS/32WS/32MD/32WD/32XD	(Chinese Taipei) Lin Kuan-ting	(Japan) Keita Makino
26 September	Yogyakarta Indonesia International Challenge: Host: Yogyakarta, Indonesia; Venue: Among Rogo Sports Hall; Level: International Challenge; Prize: $15,000; Format: 64MS/32WS/32MD/32WD/32XD	Score: 14–21, 21–14, 21–14	
26 September	Yogyakarta Indonesia International Challenge: Host: Yogyakarta, Indonesia; Venue: Among Rogo Sports Hall; Level: International Challenge; Prize: $15,000; Format: 64MS/32WS/32MD/32WD/32XD	(Indonesia) Ester Nurumi Tri Wardoyo	(Indonesia) Komang Ayu Cahya Dewi
26 September	Yogyakarta Indonesia International Challenge: Host: Yogyakarta, Indonesia; Venue: Among Rogo Sports Hall; Level: International Challenge; Prize: $15,000; Format: 64MS/32WS/32MD/32WD/32XD	Score: 15–21, 21–14, 21–15	
26 September	Yogyakarta Indonesia International Challenge: Host: Yogyakarta, Indonesia; Venue: Among Rogo Sports Hall; Level: International Challenge; Prize: $15,000; Format: 64MS/32WS/32MD/32WD/32XD	(Japan) Takumi Nomura (Japan) Yuichi Shimogami	(Indonesia) Berry Angriawan (Indonesia) Rian Agung Saputro
26 September	Yogyakarta Indonesia International Challenge: Host: Yogyakarta, Indonesia; Venue: Among Rogo Sports Hall; Level: International Challenge; Prize: $15,000; Format: 64MS/32WS/32MD/32WD/32XD	Score: 21–16, 21–15	
26 September	Yogyakarta Indonesia International Challenge: Host: Yogyakarta, Indonesia; Venue: Among Rogo Sports Hall; Level: International Challenge; Prize: $15,000; Format: 64MS/32WS/32MD/32WD/32XD	(Indonesia) Anggia Shitta Awanda (Indonesia) Putri Larasati	(Chinese Taipei) Sung Yu-hsuan (Chinese Taipei) Wang Szu-min
26 September	Yogyakarta Indonesia International Challenge: Host: Yogyakarta, Indonesia; Venue: Among Rogo Sports Hall; Level: International Challenge; Prize: $15,000; Format: 64MS/32WS/32MD/32WD/32XD	Score: 21–19, 22–20	
26 September	Yogyakarta Indonesia International Challenge: Host: Yogyakarta, Indonesia; Venue: Among Rogo Sports Hall; Level: International Challenge; Prize: $15,000; Format: 64MS/32WS/32MD/32WD/32XD	(Indonesia) Akbar Bintang Cahyono (Indonesia) Marsheilla Gischa Islami	(Indonesia) Adnan Maulana (Indonesia) Indah Cahya Sari Jamil
26 September	Yogyakarta Indonesia International Challenge: Host: Yogyakarta, Indonesia; Venue: Among Rogo Sports Hall; Level: International Challenge; Prize: $15,000; Format: 64MS/32WS/32MD/32WD/32XD	Score: 21–17, 14–21, 21–16	
26 September	Finnish Open (cancelled) (Note: This tournament, originally to be played on 28 September – 1 October, was later cancelled due to the COVID-19 pandemic in Finland on 30 August 2022.): Host: Vantaa, Finland; Venue: Energia Areena; Level: International Challenge; Prize: $15,000; Format: 32MS/32WS/32MD/32WD/32XD		
26 September	Finnish Open (cancelled): Host: Vantaa, Finland; Venue: Energia Areena; Level: International Challenge; Prize: $15,000; Format: 32MS/32WS/32MD/32WD/32XD	Score:	
26 September	Finnish Open (cancelled): Host: Vantaa, Finland; Venue: Energia Areena; Level: International Challenge; Prize: $15,000; Format: 32MS/32WS/32MD/32WD/32XD	Score:	
26 September	Finnish Open (cancelled): Host: Vantaa, Finland; Venue: Energia Areena; Level: International Challenge; Prize: $15,000; Format: 32MS/32WS/32MD/32WD/32XD	Score:	
26 September	Finnish Open (cancelled): Host: Vantaa, Finland; Venue: Energia Areena; Level: International Challenge; Prize: $15,000; Format: 32MS/32WS/32MD/32WD/32XD	Score:	
26 September	Finnish Open (cancelled): Host: Vantaa, Finland; Venue: Energia Areena; Level: International Challenge; Prize: $15,000; Format: 32MS/32WS/32MD/32WD/32XD	Score:	
26 September	Guatemala International Series: Host: Guatemala City, Guatemala; Venue: Gimnasio Teodoro Palacios Flores; Level: International Series; Prize: $5,000; Format: 32MS/32WS/16MD/16WD/16XD	(Italy) Giovanni Toti	(El Salvador) Uriel Canjura
26 September	Guatemala International Series: Host: Guatemala City, Guatemala; Venue: Gimnasio Teodoro Palacios Flores; Level: International Series; Prize: $5,000; Format: 32MS/32WS/16MD/16WD/16XD	Score: 22–20, 22–20	
26 September	Guatemala International Series: Host: Guatemala City, Guatemala; Venue: Gimnasio Teodoro Palacios Flores; Level: International Series; Prize: $5,000; Format: 32MS/32WS/16MD/16WD/16XD	(Bulgaria) Hristomira Popovska	(Mexico) Vanessa García
26 September	Guatemala International Series: Host: Guatemala City, Guatemala; Venue: Gimnasio Teodoro Palacios Flores; Level: International Series; Prize: $5,000; Format: 32MS/32WS/16MD/16WD/16XD	Score: 22–20, 21–15	
26 September	Guatemala International Series: Host: Guatemala City, Guatemala; Venue: Gimnasio Teodoro Palacios Flores; Level: International Series; Prize: $5,000; Format: 32MS/32WS/16MD/16WD/16XD	(Guatemala) Aníbal Marroquín (Guatemala) Jonathan Solís	(Guatemala) Rubén Castellanos (Guatemala) Christopher Martínez
26 September	Guatemala International Series: Host: Guatemala City, Guatemala; Venue: Gimnasio Teodoro Palacios Flores; Level: International Series; Prize: $5,000; Format: 32MS/32WS/16MD/16WD/16XD	Score: 18–21, 21–18, 21–8	
26 September	Guatemala International Series: Host: Guatemala City, Guatemala; Venue: Gimnasio Teodoro Palacios Flores; Level: International Series; Prize: $5,000; Format: 32MS/32WS/16MD/16WD/16XD	(Canada) Sharon Au (Canada) Jeslyn Chow	(Guatemala) Diana Corleto (Guatemala) Nikte Sotomayor
26 September	Guatemala International Series: Host: Guatemala City, Guatemala; Venue: Gimnasio Teodoro Palacios Flores; Level: International Series; Prize: $5,000; Format: 32MS/32WS/16MD/16WD/16XD	Score: 21–19, 21–14	
26 September	Guatemala International Series: Host: Guatemala City, Guatemala; Venue: Gimnasio Teodoro Palacios Flores; Level: International Series; Prize: $5,000; Format: 32MS/32WS/16MD/16WD/16XD	(Guatemala) Jonathan Solís (Guatemala) Diana Corleto	(Guatemala) Christopher Martínez (Guatemala) Mariana Paiz
26 September	Guatemala International Series: Host: Guatemala City, Guatemala; Venue: Gimnasio Teodoro Palacios Flores; Level: International Series; Prize: $5,000; Format: 32MS/32WS/16MD/16WD/16XD	Score: 21–13, 18–21, 21–14	
26 September	Croatian International: Host: Zagreb, Croatia; Venue: Dom Sportova; Level: Future Series; Format: 32MS/32WS/32MD/32WD/32XD	(China) Liu Haichao	(Indonesia) Andi Fadel Muhammad
26 September	Croatian International: Host: Zagreb, Croatia; Venue: Dom Sportova; Level: Future Series; Format: 32MS/32WS/32MD/32WD/32XD	Score: 19–21, 21–19, 21–18	
26 September	Croatian International: Host: Zagreb, Croatia; Venue: Dom Sportova; Level: Future Series; Format: 32MS/32WS/32MD/32WD/32XD	(Chinese Taipei) Huang Ching-ping	(Chinese Taipei) Lin Hsiang-ti
26 September	Croatian International: Host: Zagreb, Croatia; Venue: Dom Sportova; Level: Future Series; Format: 32MS/32WS/32MD/32WD/32XD	Score: 21–13, 22–20	
26 September	Croatian International: Host: Zagreb, Croatia; Venue: Dom Sportova; Level: Future Series; Format: 32MS/32WS/32MD/32WD/32XD	(Chinese Taipei) Chiu Hsiang-chieh (Chinese Taipei) Yang Ming-tse	(Chinese Taipei) Chen Yu-che (Chinese Taipei) Lin Bing-wei
26 September	Croatian International: Host: Zagreb, Croatia; Venue: Dom Sportova; Level: Future Series; Format: 32MS/32WS/32MD/32WD/32XD	Score: 21–15, 21–7	
26 September	Croatian International: Host: Zagreb, Croatia; Venue: Dom Sportova; Level: Future Series; Format: 32MS/32WS/32MD/32WD/32XD	(China) Qiao Shijun (China) Zhou Xinru	(Chinese Taipei) Hsieh Pei-shan (Chinese Taipei) Tseng Yu-chi
26 September	Croatian International: Host: Zagreb, Croatia; Venue: Dom Sportova; Level: Future Series; Format: 32MS/32WS/32MD/32WD/32XD	Score: 18–21, 21–12, 21–17	
26 September	Croatian International: Host: Zagreb, Croatia; Venue: Dom Sportova; Level: Future Series; Format: 32MS/32WS/32MD/32WD/32XD	(Chinese Taipei) Chiu Hsiang-chieh (Chinese Taipei) Lin Xiao-min	(Chinese Taipei) Liao Chao-pang (Chinese Taipei) Liu Chiao-yun
26 September	Croatian International: Host: Zagreb, Croatia; Venue: Dom Sportova; Level: Future Series; Format: 32MS/32WS/32MD/32WD/32XD	Score: 21–17, 23–21	

=== October ===
Week commencing	Tournament	Champions	Runners-up
3 October	U.S. Open (Draw) (cancelled) (Note: This tournament, originally to be played on 4–9 October, was later cancelled due to the COVID-19 pandemic in the United States.): Host: United States; Venue: Level: Super 300; Prize: $180,000; Format: 32MS/32WS/32MD/32WD/32XD		
3 October	U.S. Open (Draw) (cancelled): Host: United States; Venue: Level: Super 300; Prize: $180,000; Format: 32MS/32WS/32MD/32WD/32XD	Score:	
3 October	U.S. Open (Draw) (cancelled): Host: United States; Venue: Level: Super 300; Prize: $180,000; Format: 32MS/32WS/32MD/32WD/32XD	Score:	
3 October	U.S. Open (Draw) (cancelled): Host: United States; Venue: Level: Super 300; Prize: $180,000; Format: 32MS/32WS/32MD/32WD/32XD	Score:	
3 October	U.S. Open (Draw) (cancelled): Host: United States; Venue: Level: Super 300; Prize: $180,000; Format: 32MS/32WS/32MD/32WD/32XD	Score:	
3 October	U.S. Open (Draw) (cancelled): Host: United States; Venue: Level: Super 300; Prize: $180,000; Format: 32MS/32WS/32MD/32WD/32XD	Score:	
3 October	Sydney International: Host: Sydney, New South Wales, Australia; Venue: Genea Netball Centre; Level: International Series; Prize: $5,000; Format: 64MS/32WS/32MD/32WD/32XD	(Chinese Taipei) Lin Chun-yi	(Singapore) Joel Koh
3 October	Sydney International: Host: Sydney, New South Wales, Australia; Venue: Genea Netball Centre; Level: International Series; Prize: $5,000; Format: 64MS/32WS/32MD/32WD/32XD	Score: 21–11, 12–21, 21–10	
3 October	Sydney International: Host: Sydney, New South Wales, Australia; Venue: Genea Netball Centre; Level: International Series; Prize: $5,000; Format: 64MS/32WS/32MD/32WD/32XD	(Chinese Taipei) Sung Shuo-yun	(Chinese Taipei) Chen Su-yu
3 October	Sydney International: Host: Sydney, New South Wales, Australia; Venue: Genea Netball Centre; Level: International Series; Prize: $5,000; Format: 64MS/32WS/32MD/32WD/32XD	Score: 17–21, 21–16, 21–14	
3 October	Sydney International: Host: Sydney, New South Wales, Australia; Venue: Genea Netball Centre; Level: International Series; Prize: $5,000; Format: 64MS/32WS/32MD/32WD/32XD	(Chinese Taipei) Lee Fang-chih (Chinese Taipei) Lee Fang-jen	(Canada) Adam Dong (Canada) Nyl Yakura
3 October	Sydney International: Host: Sydney, New South Wales, Australia; Venue: Genea Netball Centre; Level: International Series; Prize: $5,000; Format: 64MS/32WS/32MD/32WD/32XD	Score: 21–12, 16–21, 21–16	
3 October	Sydney International: Host: Sydney, New South Wales, Australia; Venue: Genea Netball Centre; Level: International Series; Prize: $5,000; Format: 64MS/32WS/32MD/32WD/32XD	(Chinese Taipei) Sung Shuo-yun (Chinese Taipei) Yu Chien-hui	(Chinese Taipei) Chang Ching-hui (Chinese Taipei) Yang Ching-tun
3 October	Sydney International: Host: Sydney, New South Wales, Australia; Venue: Genea Netball Centre; Level: International Series; Prize: $5,000; Format: 64MS/32WS/32MD/32WD/32XD	Score: 21–16, 21–11	
3 October	Sydney International: Host: Sydney, New South Wales, Australia; Venue: Genea Netball Centre; Level: International Series; Prize: $5,000; Format: 64MS/32WS/32MD/32WD/32XD	(Chinese Taipei) Chen Xin-yuan (Chinese Taipei) Yang Ching-tun	(Chinese Taipei) Po Li-wei (Chinese Taipei) Chang Ching-hui
3 October	Sydney International: Host: Sydney, New South Wales, Australia; Venue: Genea Netball Centre; Level: International Series; Prize: $5,000; Format: 64MS/32WS/32MD/32WD/32XD	Score: 21–19, 21–15	
3 October	Bulgarian International Championship: Host: Sofia, Bulgaria; Venue: Badminton Hall "Europe"; Level: Future Series; Format: 32MS/32WS/32MD/16WD/32XD	(Chinese Taipei) Wang Po-wei	(Chinese Taipei) Huang Yu
3 October	Bulgarian International Championship: Host: Sofia, Bulgaria; Venue: Badminton Hall "Europe"; Level: Future Series; Format: 32MS/32WS/32MD/16WD/32XD	Score: 21–11, 21–17	
3 October	Bulgarian International Championship: Host: Sofia, Bulgaria; Venue: Badminton Hall "Europe"; Level: Future Series; Format: 32MS/32WS/32MD/16WD/32XD	(Chinese Taipei) Lin Sih-yun	(Chinese Taipei) Huang Yu-hsun
3 October	Bulgarian International Championship: Host: Sofia, Bulgaria; Venue: Badminton Hall "Europe"; Level: Future Series; Format: 32MS/32WS/32MD/16WD/32XD	Score: 21–14, 21–15	
3 October	Bulgarian International Championship: Host: Sofia, Bulgaria; Venue: Badminton Hall "Europe"; Level: Future Series; Format: 32MS/32WS/32MD/16WD/32XD	(Chinese Taipei) Chiang Chien-wei (Chinese Taipei) Wu Hsuan-yi	(Chinese Taipei) Chiu Hsiang-chieh (Chinese Taipei) Yang Ming-tse
3 October	Bulgarian International Championship: Host: Sofia, Bulgaria; Venue: Badminton Hall "Europe"; Level: Future Series; Format: 32MS/32WS/32MD/16WD/32XD	Score: 21–17, 18–21, 22–20	
3 October	Bulgarian International Championship: Host: Sofia, Bulgaria; Venue: Badminton Hall "Europe"; Level: Future Series; Format: 32MS/32WS/32MD/16WD/32XD	(Chinese Taipei) Liu Chiao-yun (Chinese Taipei) Wang Yu-qiao	(Chinese Taipei) Lin Chih-chun (Chinese Taipei) Wu Meng-chen
3 October	Bulgarian International Championship: Host: Sofia, Bulgaria; Venue: Badminton Hall "Europe"; Level: Future Series; Format: 32MS/32WS/32MD/16WD/32XD	Score: 21–16, 22–20	
3 October	Bulgarian International Championship: Host: Sofia, Bulgaria; Venue: Badminton Hall "Europe"; Level: Future Series; Format: 32MS/32WS/32MD/16WD/32XD	(Chinese Taipei) Chiu Hsiang-chieh (Chinese Taipei) Lin Xiao-min	(Chinese Taipei) Liao Chao-pang (Chinese Taipei) Liu Chiao-yun
3 October	Bulgarian International Championship: Host: Sofia, Bulgaria; Venue: Badminton Hall "Europe"; Level: Future Series; Format: 32MS/32WS/32MD/16WD/32XD	Score: 21–16, 21–10	
10 October	Bendigo International: Host: West Bendigo, Victoria, Australia; Venue: Red Energy Arena; Level: International Challenge; Prize: $15,000; Format: 64MS/32WS/32MD/32WD/32XD	(Chinese Taipei) Lin Chun-yi	(Chinese Taipei) Su Li-yang
10 October	Bendigo International: Host: West Bendigo, Victoria, Australia; Venue: Red Energy Arena; Level: International Challenge; Prize: $15,000; Format: 64MS/32WS/32MD/32WD/32XD	Score: 21–19, 22–20	
10 October	Bendigo International: Host: West Bendigo, Victoria, Australia; Venue: Red Energy Arena; Level: International Challenge; Prize: $15,000; Format: 64MS/32WS/32MD/32WD/32XD	(Chinese Taipei) Sung Shuo-yun	(Vietnam) Nguyễn Thùy Linh
10 October	Bendigo International: Host: West Bendigo, Victoria, Australia; Venue: Red Energy Arena; Level: International Challenge; Prize: $15,000; Format: 64MS/32WS/32MD/32WD/32XD	Score: 21–19, 21–15	
10 October	Bendigo International: Host: West Bendigo, Victoria, Australia; Venue: Red Energy Arena; Level: International Challenge; Prize: $15,000; Format: 64MS/32WS/32MD/32WD/32XD	(Chinese Taipei) Chang Ko-chi (Chinese Taipei) Po Li-wei	(Chinese Taipei) Lee Fang-chih (Chinese Taipei) Lee Fang-jen
10 October	Bendigo International: Host: West Bendigo, Victoria, Australia; Venue: Red Energy Arena; Level: International Challenge; Prize: $15,000; Format: 64MS/32WS/32MD/32WD/32XD	Score: 21–15, 14–21, 22–20	
10 October	Bendigo International: Host: West Bendigo, Victoria, Australia; Venue: Red Energy Arena; Level: International Challenge; Prize: $15,000; Format: 64MS/32WS/32MD/32WD/32XD	(Chinese Taipei) Lee Chia-hsin (Chinese Taipei) Teng Chun-hsun	(Chinese Taipei) Chang Ching-hui (Chinese Taipei) Yang Ching-tun
10 October	Bendigo International: Host: West Bendigo, Victoria, Australia; Venue: Red Energy Arena; Level: International Challenge; Prize: $15,000; Format: 64MS/32WS/32MD/32WD/32XD	Score: 19–21, 22–20, 21–14	
10 October	Bendigo International: Host: West Bendigo, Victoria, Australia; Venue: Red Energy Arena; Level: International Challenge; Prize: $15,000; Format: 64MS/32WS/32MD/32WD/32XD	(Chinese Taipei) Chang Ko-chi (Chinese Taipei) Lee Chih-chen	(Japan) Sumiya Nihei (Japan) Minami Asakura
10 October	Bendigo International: Host: West Bendigo, Victoria, Australia; Venue: Red Energy Arena; Level: International Challenge; Prize: $15,000; Format: 64MS/32WS/32MD/32WD/32XD	Score: 16–21, 21–18, 21–17	
10 October	Malang Indonesia International Challenge: Host: Malang, Indonesia; Venue: Platinum Sports Hall; Level: International Challenge; Prize: $25,000; Format: 64MS/64WS/64MD/32WD/32XD	(China) Weng Hongyang	(China) Lei Lanxi
10 October	Malang Indonesia International Challenge: Host: Malang, Indonesia; Venue: Platinum Sports Hall; Level: International Challenge; Prize: $25,000; Format: 64MS/64WS/64MD/32WD/32XD	Score: 21–10, 21–10	
10 October	Malang Indonesia International Challenge: Host: Malang, Indonesia; Venue: Platinum Sports Hall; Level: International Challenge; Prize: $25,000; Format: 64MS/64WS/64MD/32WD/32XD	(China) Gao Fangjie	(Japan) Riko Gunji
10 October	Malang Indonesia International Challenge: Host: Malang, Indonesia; Venue: Platinum Sports Hall; Level: International Challenge; Prize: $25,000; Format: 64MS/64WS/64MD/32WD/32XD	Score: 21–9, 21–11	
10 October	Malang Indonesia International Challenge: Host: Malang, Indonesia; Venue: Platinum Sports Hall; Level: International Challenge; Prize: $25,000; Format: 64MS/64WS/64MD/32WD/32XD	(Indonesia) Rahmat Hidayat (Indonesia) Pramudya Kusumawardana	(Japan) Hiroki Okamura (Japan) Masayuki Onodera
10 October	Malang Indonesia International Challenge: Host: Malang, Indonesia; Venue: Platinum Sports Hall; Level: International Challenge; Prize: $25,000; Format: 64MS/64WS/64MD/32WD/32XD	Score: 23–21, 16–21, 21–15	
10 October	Malang Indonesia International Challenge: Host: Malang, Indonesia; Venue: Platinum Sports Hall; Level: International Challenge; Prize: $25,000; Format: 64MS/64WS/64MD/32WD/32XD	(Indonesia) Lanny Tria Mayasari (Indonesia) Ribka Sugiarto	(Japan) Sayaka Hobara (Japan) Hinata Suzuki
10 October	Malang Indonesia International Challenge: Host: Malang, Indonesia; Venue: Platinum Sports Hall; Level: International Challenge; Prize: $25,000; Format: 64MS/64WS/64MD/32WD/32XD	Score: 21–16, 21–18	
10 October	Malang Indonesia International Challenge: Host: Malang, Indonesia; Venue: Platinum Sports Hall; Level: International Challenge; Prize: $25,000; Format: 64MS/64WS/64MD/32WD/32XD	(Indonesia) Dejan Ferdinansyah (Indonesia) Gloria Emanuelle Widjaja	(China) Jiang Zhenbang (China) Wei Yaxin
10 October	Malang Indonesia International Challenge: Host: Malang, Indonesia; Venue: Platinum Sports Hall; Level: International Challenge; Prize: $25,000; Format: 64MS/64WS/64MD/32WD/32XD	Score: 21–18, 22–20	
10 October	India International Challenge: Host: Bengaluru, India; Venue: Prakash Padukone Badminton Academy; Level: International Challenge; Prize: $25,000; Format: 64MS/64WS/32MD/32WD/32XD	(India) Sourabh Verma	(India) Mithun Manjunath
10 October	India International Challenge: Host: Bengaluru, India; Venue: Prakash Padukone Badminton Academy; Level: International Challenge; Prize: $25,000; Format: 64MS/64WS/32MD/32WD/32XD	Score: 21–18, 17–21, 21–16	
10 October	India International Challenge: Host: Bengaluru, India; Venue: Prakash Padukone Badminton Academy; Level: International Challenge; Prize: $25,000; Format: 64MS/64WS/32MD/32WD/32XD	(India) Tanya Hemanth	(India) Gadde Ruthvika Shivani
10 October	India International Challenge: Host: Bengaluru, India; Venue: Prakash Padukone Badminton Academy; Level: International Challenge; Prize: $25,000; Format: 64MS/64WS/32MD/32WD/32XD	Score: 21–19, 17–21, 21–17	
10 October	India International Challenge: Host: Bengaluru, India; Venue: Prakash Padukone Badminton Academy; Level: International Challenge; Prize: $25,000; Format: 64MS/64WS/32MD/32WD/32XD	(Thailand) Chaloempon Charoenkitamorn (Thailand) Nanthakarn Yordphaisong	(Thailand) Tanadon Punpanich (Thailand) Wachirawit Sothon
10 October	India International Challenge: Host: Bengaluru, India; Venue: Prakash Padukone Badminton Academy; Level: International Challenge; Prize: $25,000; Format: 64MS/64WS/32MD/32WD/32XD	Score: 21–11, 21–14	
10 October	India International Challenge: Host: Bengaluru, India; Venue: Prakash Padukone Badminton Academy; Level: International Challenge; Prize: $25,000; Format: 64MS/64WS/32MD/32WD/32XD	(India) Ashwini Bhat K. (India) Shikha Gautam	(India) Arul Bala Radhakrishnan (India) Varshini Viswanath Sri
10 October	India International Challenge: Host: Bengaluru, India; Venue: Prakash Padukone Badminton Academy; Level: International Challenge; Prize: $25,000; Format: 64MS/64WS/32MD/32WD/32XD	Score: 21–16, 21–15	
10 October	India International Challenge: Host: Bengaluru, India; Venue: Prakash Padukone Badminton Academy; Level: International Challenge; Prize: $25,000; Format: 64MS/64WS/32MD/32WD/32XD	(India) K. Sai Pratheek (India) Ashwini Ponnappa	(India) Rohan Kapoor (India) N. Sikki Reddy
10 October	India International Challenge: Host: Bengaluru, India; Venue: Prakash Padukone Badminton Academy; Level: International Challenge; Prize: $25,000; Format: 64MS/64WS/32MD/32WD/32XD	Score: 21–16, 11–21, 21–18	
10 October	Dutch Open: Host: Almere, Netherlands; Venue: Topsportcentrum; Level: International Challenge; Prize: $15,000; Format: 32MS/32WS/32MD/32WD/32XD	(France) Christo Popov	(Denmark) Mads Christophersen
10 October	Dutch Open: Host: Almere, Netherlands; Venue: Topsportcentrum; Level: International Challenge; Prize: $15,000; Format: 32MS/32WS/32MD/32WD/32XD	Score: 25–23, 21–10	
10 October	Dutch Open: Host: Almere, Netherlands; Venue: Topsportcentrum; Level: International Challenge; Prize: $15,000; Format: 32MS/32WS/32MD/32WD/32XD	(Chinese Taipei) Hsu Wen-chi	(Chinese Taipei) Huang Ching-ping
10 October	Dutch Open: Host: Almere, Netherlands; Venue: Topsportcentrum; Level: International Challenge; Prize: $15,000; Format: 32MS/32WS/32MD/32WD/32XD	Score: 21–19, 21–11	
10 October	Dutch Open: Host: Almere, Netherlands; Venue: Topsportcentrum; Level: International Challenge; Prize: $15,000; Format: 32MS/32WS/32MD/32WD/32XD	(Chinese Taipei) Chiu Hsiang-chieh (Chinese Taipei) Yang Ming-tse	(England) Callum Hemming (England) Ethan van Leeuwen
10 October	Dutch Open: Host: Almere, Netherlands; Venue: Topsportcentrum; Level: International Challenge; Prize: $15,000; Format: 32MS/32WS/32MD/32WD/32XD	Score: 21–16, 21–13	
10 October	Dutch Open: Host: Almere, Netherlands; Venue: Topsportcentrum; Level: International Challenge; Prize: $15,000; Format: 32MS/32WS/32MD/32WD/32XD	(Netherlands) Debora Jille (Netherlands) Cheryl Seinen	(England) Chloe Birch (England) Lauren Smith
10 October	Dutch Open: Host: Almere, Netherlands; Venue: Topsportcentrum; Level: International Challenge; Prize: $15,000; Format: 32MS/32WS/32MD/32WD/32XD	Score: 5–10 retired	
10 October	Dutch Open: Host: Almere, Netherlands; Venue: Topsportcentrum; Level: International Challenge; Prize: $15,000; Format: 32MS/32WS/32MD/32WD/32XD	(Netherlands) Robin Tabeling (Netherlands) Selena Piek	(England) Callum Hemming (England) Jessica Pugh
10 October	Dutch Open: Host: Almere, Netherlands; Venue: Topsportcentrum; Level: International Challenge; Prize: $15,000; Format: 32MS/32WS/32MD/32WD/32XD	Score: 21–17, 21–12	
10 October	Egypt International: Host: Cairo, Egypt; Venue: Egyptian Badminton Federation; Level: International Series; Prize: $5,000; Format: 32MS/32WS/32MD/16WD/32XD	(Germany) Samuel Hsiao	(Slovakia) Milan Dratva
10 October	Egypt International: Host: Cairo, Egypt; Venue: Egyptian Badminton Federation; Level: International Series; Prize: $5,000; Format: 32MS/32WS/32MD/16WD/32XD	Score: 21–8, 21–10	
10 October	Egypt International: Host: Cairo, Egypt; Venue: Egyptian Badminton Federation; Level: International Series; Prize: $5,000; Format: 32MS/32WS/32MD/16WD/32XD	(Hungary) Daniella Gonda	(Italy) Judith Mair
10 October	Egypt International: Host: Cairo, Egypt; Venue: Egyptian Badminton Federation; Level: International Series; Prize: $5,000; Format: 32MS/32WS/32MD/16WD/32XD	Score: 21–14, 22–20	
10 October	Egypt International: Host: Cairo, Egypt; Venue: Egyptian Badminton Federation; Level: International Series; Prize: $5,000; Format: 32MS/32WS/32MD/16WD/32XD	(Thailand) Pharanyu Kaosamaang (Thailand) Worrapol Thongsa-Nga	(France) Louis Ducrot (France) Romain Frank
10 October	Egypt International: Host: Cairo, Egypt; Venue: Egyptian Badminton Federation; Level: International Series; Prize: $5,000; Format: 32MS/32WS/32MD/16WD/32XD	Score: 21–11, 21–9	
10 October	Egypt International: Host: Cairo, Egypt; Venue: Egyptian Badminton Federation; Level: International Series; Prize: $5,000; Format: 32MS/32WS/32MD/16WD/32XD	(Italy) Martina Corsini (Italy) Judith Mair	(South Africa) Amy Ackerman (South Africa) Deidre Laurens Jordaan
10 October	Egypt International: Host: Cairo, Egypt; Venue: Egyptian Badminton Federation; Level: International Series; Prize: $5,000; Format: 32MS/32WS/32MD/16WD/32XD	Score: 21–5, 21–13	
10 October	Egypt International: Host: Cairo, Egypt; Venue: Egyptian Badminton Federation; Level: International Series; Prize: $5,000; Format: 32MS/32WS/32MD/16WD/32XD	(Thailand) Ratchapol Makkasasithorn (Thailand) Chasinee Korepap	(Thailand) Ruttanapak Oupthong (Thailand) Jhenicha Sudjaipraparat
10 October	Egypt International: Host: Cairo, Egypt; Venue: Egyptian Badminton Federation; Level: International Series; Prize: $5,000; Format: 32MS/32WS/32MD/16WD/32XD	Score: 21–16, 21–9	
10 October	Cyprus International (cancelled) (Note: This tournament, originally to be played on 13–16 October, was later cancelled due to the COVID-19 pandemic in Cyprus.): Host: Nicosia, Cyprus; Venue: Eleftheria Athletic Center; Level: Future Series; Format: TBD		
10 October	Cyprus International (cancelled): Host: Nicosia, Cyprus; Venue: Eleftheria Athletic Center; Level: Future Series; Format: TBD	Score:	
10 October	Cyprus International (cancelled): Host: Nicosia, Cyprus; Venue: Eleftheria Athletic Center; Level: Future Series; Format: TBD	Score:	
10 October	Cyprus International (cancelled): Host: Nicosia, Cyprus; Venue: Eleftheria Athletic Center; Level: Future Series; Format: TBD	Score:	
10 October	Cyprus International (cancelled): Host: Nicosia, Cyprus; Venue: Eleftheria Athletic Center; Level: Future Series; Format: TBD	Score:	
10 October	Cyprus International (cancelled): Host: Nicosia, Cyprus; Venue: Eleftheria Athletic Center; Level: Future Series; Format: TBD	Score:	
17 October	Denmark Open (Draw): Host: Odense, Denmark; Venue: Arena Fyn; Level: Super 750; Prize: $750,000; Format: 32MS/32WS/32MD/32WD/32XD	(China) Shi Yuqi	(Malaysia) Lee Zii Jia
17 October	Denmark Open (Draw): Host: Odense, Denmark; Venue: Arena Fyn; Level: Super 750; Prize: $750,000; Format: 32MS/32WS/32MD/32WD/32XD	Score: 21–18, 16–21, 21–12	
17 October	Denmark Open (Draw): Host: Odense, Denmark; Venue: Arena Fyn; Level: Super 750; Prize: $750,000; Format: 32MS/32WS/32MD/32WD/32XD	(China) He Bingjiao	(China) Chen Yufei
17 October	Denmark Open (Draw): Host: Odense, Denmark; Venue: Arena Fyn; Level: Super 750; Prize: $750,000; Format: 32MS/32WS/32MD/32WD/32XD	Score: 22–20, 12–21, 21–10	
17 October	Denmark Open (Draw): Host: Odense, Denmark; Venue: Arena Fyn; Level: Super 750; Prize: $750,000; Format: 32MS/32WS/32MD/32WD/32XD	(Indonesia) Fajar Alfian (Indonesia) Muhammad Rian Ardianto	(Indonesia) Marcus Fernaldi Gideon (Indonesia) Kevin Sanjaya Sukamuljo
17 October	Denmark Open (Draw): Host: Odense, Denmark; Venue: Arena Fyn; Level: Super 750; Prize: $750,000; Format: 32MS/32WS/32MD/32WD/32XD	Score: 21–19, 28–26	
17 October	Denmark Open (Draw): Host: Odense, Denmark; Venue: Arena Fyn; Level: Super 750; Prize: $750,000; Format: 32MS/32WS/32MD/32WD/32XD	(China) Chen Qingchen (China) Jia Yifan	(South Korea) Baek Ha-na (South Korea) Lee So-hee
17 October	Denmark Open (Draw): Host: Odense, Denmark; Venue: Arena Fyn; Level: Super 750; Prize: $750,000; Format: 32MS/32WS/32MD/32WD/32XD	Score: 21–12, 21–15	
17 October	Denmark Open (Draw): Host: Odense, Denmark; Venue: Arena Fyn; Level: Super 750; Prize: $750,000; Format: 32MS/32WS/32MD/32WD/32XD	(China) Zheng Siwei (China) Huang Yaqiong	(China) Feng Yanzhe (China) Huang Dongping
17 October	Denmark Open (Draw): Host: Odense, Denmark; Venue: Arena Fyn; Level: Super 750; Prize: $750,000; Format: 32MS/32WS/32MD/32WD/32XD	Score: 21–19, 20–22, 21–19	
17 October	Indonesia Masters Super 100 (Draw): Host: Malang, Indonesia; Venue: Platinum Sports Hall; Level: Super 100; Prize: $90,000; Format: 64MS/32WS/32MD/32WD/32XD	(Malaysia) Leong Jun Hao	(Malaysia) Cheam June Wei
17 October	Indonesia Masters Super 100 (Draw): Host: Malang, Indonesia; Venue: Platinum Sports Hall; Level: Super 100; Prize: $90,000; Format: 64MS/32WS/32MD/32WD/32XD	Score: 9–21, 22–20, 21–19	
17 October	Indonesia Masters Super 100 (Draw): Host: Malang, Indonesia; Venue: Platinum Sports Hall; Level: Super 100; Prize: $90,000; Format: 64MS/32WS/32MD/32WD/32XD	(China) Gao Fangjie	(Japan) Riko Gunji
17 October	Indonesia Masters Super 100 (Draw): Host: Malang, Indonesia; Venue: Platinum Sports Hall; Level: Super 100; Prize: $90,000; Format: 64MS/32WS/32MD/32WD/32XD	Score: 21–10, 21–12	
17 October	Indonesia Masters Super 100 (Draw): Host: Malang, Indonesia; Venue: Platinum Sports Hall; Level: Super 100; Prize: $90,000; Format: 64MS/32WS/32MD/32WD/32XD	(Indonesia) Rahmat Hidayat (Indonesia) Pramudya Kusumawardana	(China) He Jiting (China) Zhou Haodong
17 October	Indonesia Masters Super 100 (Draw): Host: Malang, Indonesia; Venue: Platinum Sports Hall; Level: Super 100; Prize: $90,000; Format: 64MS/32WS/32MD/32WD/32XD	Score: 21–18, 21–19	
17 October	Indonesia Masters Super 100 (Draw): Host: Malang, Indonesia; Venue: Platinum Sports Hall; Level: Super 100; Prize: $90,000; Format: 64MS/32WS/32MD/32WD/32XD	(Japan) Rui Hirokami (Japan) Yuna Kato	(Japan) Rena Miyaura (Japan) Ayako Sakuramoto
17 October	Indonesia Masters Super 100 (Draw): Host: Malang, Indonesia; Venue: Platinum Sports Hall; Level: Super 100; Prize: $90,000; Format: 64MS/32WS/32MD/32WD/32XD	Score: 23–21, 21–18	
17 October	Indonesia Masters Super 100 (Draw): Host: Malang, Indonesia; Venue: Platinum Sports Hall; Level: Super 100; Prize: $90,000; Format: 64MS/32WS/32MD/32WD/32XD	(China) Jiang Zhenbang (China) Wei Yaxin	(China) Cheng Xing (China) Chen Fanghui
17 October	Indonesia Masters Super 100 (Draw): Host: Malang, Indonesia; Venue: Platinum Sports Hall; Level: Super 100; Prize: $90,000; Format: 64MS/32WS/32MD/32WD/32XD	Score: 21–12, 21–15	
17 October	North Harbour International: Host: Auckland, New Zealand; Venue: Badminton North Harbour Centre; Level: International Challenge; Prize: $15,000; Format: 64MS/32WS/32MD/32WD/32XD	(Japan) Yushi Tanaka	(Japan) Riku Hatano
17 October	North Harbour International: Host: Auckland, New Zealand; Venue: Badminton North Harbour Centre; Level: International Challenge; Prize: $15,000; Format: 64MS/32WS/32MD/32WD/32XD	Score: 21–13, 21–18	
17 October	North Harbour International: Host: Auckland, New Zealand; Venue: Badminton North Harbour Centre; Level: International Challenge; Prize: $15,000; Format: 64MS/32WS/32MD/32WD/32XD	(Japan) Shiori Saito	(Japan) Hirari Mizui
17 October	North Harbour International: Host: Auckland, New Zealand; Venue: Badminton North Harbour Centre; Level: International Challenge; Prize: $15,000; Format: 64MS/32WS/32MD/32WD/32XD	Score: 21–19, 21–19	
17 October	North Harbour International: Host: Auckland, New Zealand; Venue: Badminton North Harbour Centre; Level: International Challenge; Prize: $15,000; Format: 64MS/32WS/32MD/32WD/32XD	(Chinese Taipei) Chang Ko-chi (Chinese Taipei) Po Li-wei	(Chinese Taipei) Lee Fang-chih (Chinese Taipei) Lee Fang-jen
17 October	North Harbour International: Host: Auckland, New Zealand; Venue: Badminton North Harbour Centre; Level: International Challenge; Prize: $15,000; Format: 64MS/32WS/32MD/32WD/32XD	Score: 10–21, 22–20, 21–13	
17 October	North Harbour International: Host: Auckland, New Zealand; Venue: Badminton North Harbour Centre; Level: International Challenge; Prize: $15,000; Format: 64MS/32WS/32MD/32WD/32XD	(Chinese Taipei) Sung Shuo-yun (Chinese Taipei) Yu Chien-hui	(Australia) Chen Hsuan-yu (Australia) Gronya Somerville
17 October	North Harbour International: Host: Auckland, New Zealand; Venue: Badminton North Harbour Centre; Level: International Challenge; Prize: $15,000; Format: 64MS/32WS/32MD/32WD/32XD	Score: 21–19, 21–17	
17 October	North Harbour International: Host: Auckland, New Zealand; Venue: Badminton North Harbour Centre; Level: International Challenge; Prize: $15,000; Format: 64MS/32WS/32MD/32WD/32XD	(Chinese Taipei) Chang Ko-chi (Chinese Taipei) Lee Chih-chen	(Japan) Sumiya Nihei (Japan) Minami Asakura
17 October	North Harbour International: Host: Auckland, New Zealand; Venue: Badminton North Harbour Centre; Level: International Challenge; Prize: $15,000; Format: 64MS/32WS/32MD/32WD/32XD	Score: 16–21, 21–9, 21–19	
17 October	Maldives International: Host: Malé, Maldives; Venue: Malé Sports Complex; Level: International Challenge; Prize: $15,000; Format: 64MS/64WS/32MD/32WD/32XD	(Spain) Luís Enrique Peñalver	(Israel) Misha Zilberman
17 October	Maldives International: Host: Malé, Maldives; Venue: Malé Sports Complex; Level: International Challenge; Prize: $15,000; Format: 64MS/64WS/32MD/32WD/32XD	Score: 21–7, 11–21, 21–18	
17 October	Maldives International: Host: Malé, Maldives; Venue: Malé Sports Complex; Level: International Challenge; Prize: $15,000; Format: 64MS/64WS/32MD/32WD/32XD	(India) Aakarshi Kashyap	(India) Ira Sharma
17 October	Maldives International: Host: Malé, Maldives; Venue: Malé Sports Complex; Level: International Challenge; Prize: $15,000; Format: 64MS/64WS/32MD/32WD/32XD	Score: 24–22, 21–12	
17 October	Maldives International: Host: Malé, Maldives; Venue: Malé Sports Complex; Level: International Challenge; Prize: $15,000; Format: 64MS/64WS/32MD/32WD/32XD	(India) Rohan Kapoor (India) B. Sumeeth Reddy	(Thailand) Chaloempon Charoenkitamorn (Thailand) Nanthakarn Yordphaisong
17 October	Maldives International: Host: Malé, Maldives; Venue: Malé Sports Complex; Level: International Challenge; Prize: $15,000; Format: 64MS/64WS/32MD/32WD/32XD	Score: 21–23, 21–19, 21–17	
17 October	Maldives International: Host: Malé, Maldives; Venue: Malé Sports Complex; Level: International Challenge; Prize: $15,000; Format: 64MS/64WS/32MD/32WD/32XD	(Japan) Chisato Hoshi (Japan) Miyu Takahashi	(Japan) Kaho Osawa (Japan) Kaoru Sugiyama
17 October	Maldives International: Host: Malé, Maldives; Venue: Malé Sports Complex; Level: International Challenge; Prize: $15,000; Format: 64MS/64WS/32MD/32WD/32XD	Score: 21–16, 21–15	
17 October	Maldives International: Host: Malé, Maldives; Venue: Malé Sports Complex; Level: International Challenge; Prize: $15,000; Format: 64MS/64WS/32MD/32WD/32XD	(India) Rohan Kapoor (India) N. Sikki Reddy	(Algeria) Koceila Mammeri (Algeria) Tanina Mammeri
17 October	Maldives International: Host: Malé, Maldives; Venue: Malé Sports Complex; Level: International Challenge; Prize: $15,000; Format: 64MS/64WS/32MD/32WD/32XD	Score: 21–16, 21–18	
17 October	Czech Open: Host: Prague, Czech Republic; Venue: Sportovní hala Štěrboholy; Level: International Series; Prize: $5,000; Format: 32MS/32WS/32MD/16WD/32XD	(Denmark) Victor Svendsen	(Chinese Taipei) Huang Yu-kai
17 October	Czech Open: Host: Prague, Czech Republic; Venue: Sportovní hala Štěrboholy; Level: International Series; Prize: $5,000; Format: 32MS/32WS/32MD/16WD/32XD	Score: 21–18, 21–17	
17 October	Czech Open: Host: Prague, Czech Republic; Venue: Sportovní hala Štěrboholy; Level: International Series; Prize: $5,000; Format: 32MS/32WS/32MD/16WD/32XD	(Denmark) Amalie Schulz	(Chinese Taipei) Huang Yu-hsun
17 October	Czech Open: Host: Prague, Czech Republic; Venue: Sportovní hala Štěrboholy; Level: International Series; Prize: $5,000; Format: 32MS/32WS/32MD/16WD/32XD	Score: 21–19, 21–14	
17 October	Czech Open: Host: Prague, Czech Republic; Venue: Sportovní hala Štěrboholy; Level: International Series; Prize: $5,000; Format: 32MS/32WS/32MD/16WD/32XD	(Thailand) Pharanyu Kaosamaang (Thailand) Worrapol Thongsa-Nga	(Chinese Taipei) Chiu Hsiang-chieh (Chinese Taipei) Yang Ming-tse
17 October	Czech Open: Host: Prague, Czech Republic; Venue: Sportovní hala Štěrboholy; Level: International Series; Prize: $5,000; Format: 32MS/32WS/32MD/16WD/32XD	Score: 21–15, 21–15	
17 October	Czech Open: Host: Prague, Czech Republic; Venue: Sportovní hala Štěrboholy; Level: International Series; Prize: $5,000; Format: 32MS/32WS/32MD/16WD/32XD	(Denmark) Christine Busch (Denmark) Amalie Schulz	(Chinese Taipei) Liu Chiao-yun (Chinese Taipei) Wang Yu-qiao
17 October	Czech Open: Host: Prague, Czech Republic; Venue: Sportovní hala Štěrboholy; Level: International Series; Prize: $5,000; Format: 32MS/32WS/32MD/16WD/32XD	Score: 21–14, 8–21, 30–29	
17 October	Czech Open: Host: Prague, Czech Republic; Venue: Sportovní hala Štěrboholy; Level: International Series; Prize: $5,000; Format: 32MS/32WS/32MD/16WD/32XD	(Denmark) Mads Vestergaard (Denmark) Christine Busch	(Chinese Taipei) Chiu Hsiang-chieh (Chinese Taipei) Lin Xiao-min
17 October	Czech Open: Host: Prague, Czech Republic; Venue: Sportovní hala Štěrboholy; Level: International Series; Prize: $5,000; Format: 32MS/32WS/32MD/16WD/32XD	Score: 21–12, 21–16	
17 October	Peru International Series: Host: Lima, Peru; Venue: Filial Villa Deportiva – Club Regatas Lima; Level: International Series; Prize: $5,000; Format: 32MS/32WS/16MD/16WD/32XD	(Brazil) Jonathan Matias	(El Salvador) Uriel Canjura
17 October	Peru International Series: Host: Lima, Peru; Venue: Filial Villa Deportiva – Club Regatas Lima; Level: International Series; Prize: $5,000; Format: 32MS/32WS/16MD/16WD/32XD	Score: 21–12, 21–15	
17 October	Peru International Series: Host: Lima, Peru; Venue: Filial Villa Deportiva – Club Regatas Lima; Level: International Series; Prize: $5,000; Format: 32MS/32WS/16MD/16WD/32XD	(Brazil) Juliana Viana Vieira	(Mexico) Haramara Gaitán
17 October	Peru International Series: Host: Lima, Peru; Venue: Filial Villa Deportiva – Club Regatas Lima; Level: International Series; Prize: $5,000; Format: 32MS/32WS/16MD/16WD/32XD	Score: 21–16, 21–16	
17 October	Peru International Series: Host: Lima, Peru; Venue: Filial Villa Deportiva – Club Regatas Lima; Level: International Series; Prize: $5,000; Format: 32MS/32WS/16MD/16WD/32XD	(Canada) Lam Wai Lok (England) Kern Pong Lap Kan	(Brazil) Jonathan Matias (Brazil) Davi Silva
17 October	Peru International Series: Host: Lima, Peru; Venue: Filial Villa Deportiva – Club Regatas Lima; Level: International Series; Prize: $5,000; Format: 32MS/32WS/16MD/16WD/32XD	Score: 21–17, 21–17	
17 October	Peru International Series: Host: Lima, Peru; Venue: Filial Villa Deportiva – Club Regatas Lima; Level: International Series; Prize: $5,000; Format: 32MS/32WS/16MD/16WD/32XD	(Brazil) Jaqueline Lima (Brazil) Sâmia Lima	(Brazil) Sânia Lima (Brazil) Tamires Santos
17 October	Peru International Series: Host: Lima, Peru; Venue: Filial Villa Deportiva – Club Regatas Lima; Level: International Series; Prize: $5,000; Format: 32MS/32WS/16MD/16WD/32XD	Score: 21–13, 21–13	
17 October	Peru International Series: Host: Lima, Peru; Venue: Filial Villa Deportiva – Club Regatas Lima; Level: International Series; Prize: $5,000; Format: 32MS/32WS/16MD/16WD/32XD	(Brazil) Fabrício Farias (Brazil) Jaqueline Lima	(Brazil) Davi Silva (Brazil) Sânia Lima
17 October	Peru International Series: Host: Lima, Peru; Venue: Filial Villa Deportiva – Club Regatas Lima; Level: International Series; Prize: $5,000; Format: 32MS/32WS/16MD/16WD/32XD	Score: 21–19, 19–21, 21–15	
24 October	French Open (Draw): Host: Paris, France; Venue: Stade Pierre de Coubertin; Level: Super 750; Prize: $600,000; Format: 32MS/32WS/32MD/32WD/32XD	(Denmark) Viktor Axelsen	(Denmark) Rasmus Gemke
24 October	French Open (Draw): Host: Paris, France; Venue: Stade Pierre de Coubertin; Level: Super 750; Prize: $600,000; Format: 32MS/32WS/32MD/32WD/32XD	Score: 21–14, 21–15	
24 October	French Open (Draw): Host: Paris, France; Venue: Stade Pierre de Coubertin; Level: Super 750; Prize: $600,000; Format: 32MS/32WS/32MD/32WD/32XD	(China) He Bingjiao	(Spain) Carolina Marín
24 October	French Open (Draw): Host: Paris, France; Venue: Stade Pierre de Coubertin; Level: Super 750; Prize: $600,000; Format: 32MS/32WS/32MD/32WD/32XD	Score: 16–21, 21–9, 22–20	
24 October	French Open (Draw): Host: Paris, France; Venue: Stade Pierre de Coubertin; Level: Super 750; Prize: $600,000; Format: 32MS/32WS/32MD/32WD/32XD	(India) Satwiksairaj Rankireddy (India) Chirag Shetty	(Chinese Taipei) Lu Ching-yao (Chinese Taipei) Yang Po-han
24 October	French Open (Draw): Host: Paris, France; Venue: Stade Pierre de Coubertin; Level: Super 750; Prize: $600,000; Format: 32MS/32WS/32MD/32WD/32XD	Score: 21–13, 21–19	
24 October	French Open (Draw): Host: Paris, France; Venue: Stade Pierre de Coubertin; Level: Super 750; Prize: $600,000; Format: 32MS/32WS/32MD/32WD/32XD	(Malaysia) Pearly Tan (Malaysia) Thinaah Muralitharan	(Japan) Mayu Matsumoto (Japan) Wakana Nagahara
24 October	French Open (Draw): Host: Paris, France; Venue: Stade Pierre de Coubertin; Level: Super 750; Prize: $600,000; Format: 32MS/32WS/32MD/32WD/32XD	Score: 21–19, 18–21, 21–15	
24 October	French Open (Draw): Host: Paris, France; Venue: Stade Pierre de Coubertin; Level: Super 750; Prize: $600,000; Format: 32MS/32WS/32MD/32WD/32XD	(China) Zheng Siwei (China) Huang Yaqiong	(Netherlands) Robin Tabeling (Netherlands) Selena Piek
24 October	French Open (Draw): Host: Paris, France; Venue: Stade Pierre de Coubertin; Level: Super 750; Prize: $600,000; Format: 32MS/32WS/32MD/32WD/32XD	Score: 21–16, 14–21, 22–20	
24 October	Pakistan International Series (cancelled) (Note: This tournament, originally to be played on 25–30 October, was later cancelled due to the COVID-19 pandemic in Pakistan.): Host: Lahore, Pakistan; Venue: Nishtar Park Sports Gymnasium; Level: International Series; Prize: $5,000; Format: 32MS/32WS/32MD/16WD/32XD		
24 October	Pakistan International Series (cancelled): Host: Lahore, Pakistan; Venue: Nishtar Park Sports Gymnasium; Level: International Series; Prize: $5,000; Format: 32MS/32WS/32MD/16WD/32XD	Score:	
24 October	Pakistan International Series (cancelled): Host: Lahore, Pakistan; Venue: Nishtar Park Sports Gymnasium; Level: International Series; Prize: $5,000; Format: 32MS/32WS/32MD/16WD/32XD	Score:	
24 October	Pakistan International Series (cancelled): Host: Lahore, Pakistan; Venue: Nishtar Park Sports Gymnasium; Level: International Series; Prize: $5,000; Format: 32MS/32WS/32MD/16WD/32XD	Score:	
24 October	Pakistan International Series (cancelled): Host: Lahore, Pakistan; Venue: Nishtar Park Sports Gymnasium; Level: International Series; Prize: $5,000; Format: 32MS/32WS/32MD/16WD/32XD	Score:	
24 October	Pakistan International Series (cancelled): Host: Lahore, Pakistan; Venue: Nishtar Park Sports Gymnasium; Level: International Series; Prize: $5,000; Format: 32MS/32WS/32MD/16WD/32XD	Score:	
24 October	Israel Open: Host: Hatzor, Israel; Venue: Kibbutz Hatzor Sport Hall; Level: Future Series; Format: 32MS/32WS/16MD/16WD/16XD	(Germany) Matthias Kicklitz	(Switzerland) Julien Scheiwiller
24 October	Israel Open: Host: Hatzor, Israel; Venue: Kibbutz Hatzor Sport Hall; Level: Future Series; Format: 32MS/32WS/16MD/16WD/16XD	Score: 21–13, 15–21, 21–13	
24 October	Israel Open: Host: Hatzor, Israel; Venue: Kibbutz Hatzor Sport Hall; Level: Future Series; Format: 32MS/32WS/16MD/16WD/16XD	(Switzerland) Dounia Pelupessy	(Israel) Ksenia Polikarpova
24 October	Israel Open: Host: Hatzor, Israel; Venue: Kibbutz Hatzor Sport Hall; Level: Future Series; Format: 32MS/32WS/16MD/16WD/16XD	Score: 19–21, 21–18, 21–18	
24 October	Israel Open: Host: Hatzor, Israel; Venue: Kibbutz Hatzor Sport Hall; Level: Future Series; Format: 32MS/32WS/16MD/16WD/16XD	(Italy) Giovanni Greco (Italy) David Salutt	(Switzerland) Arthur Boudier (Switzerland) Minh Quang Pham
24 October	Israel Open: Host: Hatzor, Israel; Venue: Kibbutz Hatzor Sport Hall; Level: Future Series; Format: 32MS/32WS/16MD/16WD/16XD	Score: 21–14, 21–11	
24 October	Israel Open: Host: Hatzor, Israel; Venue: Kibbutz Hatzor Sport Hall; Level: Future Series; Format: 32MS/32WS/16MD/16WD/16XD	(Switzerland) Aline Müller (Switzerland) Caroline Racloz	(Israel) Dana Danilenko (Israel) Katsiaryna Zablotskaya
24 October	Israel Open: Host: Hatzor, Israel; Venue: Kibbutz Hatzor Sport Hall; Level: Future Series; Format: 32MS/32WS/16MD/16WD/16XD	Score: 21–11, 21–9	
24 October	Israel Open: Host: Hatzor, Israel; Venue: Kibbutz Hatzor Sport Hall; Level: Future Series; Format: 32MS/32WS/16MD/16WD/16XD	(Switzerland) Minh Quang Pham (Switzerland) Caroline Racloz	(Switzerland) Arthur Boudier (Switzerland) Aline Müller
24 October	Israel Open: Host: Hatzor, Israel; Venue: Kibbutz Hatzor Sport Hall; Level: Future Series; Format: 32MS/32WS/16MD/16WD/16XD	Score: 23–25, 21–18, 24–22	
24 October	Dominican Open (cancelled) (Note: This tournament, originally to be played on 20–23 October, was later cancelled due to the COVID-19 pandemic in the Dominican Republic on 30 August 2022.): Host: Puerto Plata, Dominican Republic; Venue: Polideportivo Fabio Rafael Gonzalez; Level: Future Series; Prize: $2,000; Format: TBD		
24 October	Dominican Open (cancelled): Host: Puerto Plata, Dominican Republic; Venue: Polideportivo Fabio Rafael Gonzalez; Level: Future Series; Prize: $2,000; Format: TBD	Score:	
24 October	Dominican Open (cancelled): Host: Puerto Plata, Dominican Republic; Venue: Polideportivo Fabio Rafael Gonzalez; Level: Future Series; Prize: $2,000; Format: TBD	Score:	
24 October	Dominican Open (cancelled): Host: Puerto Plata, Dominican Republic; Venue: Polideportivo Fabio Rafael Gonzalez; Level: Future Series; Prize: $2,000; Format: TBD	Score:	
24 October	Dominican Open (cancelled): Host: Puerto Plata, Dominican Republic; Venue: Polideportivo Fabio Rafael Gonzalez; Level: Future Series; Prize: $2,000; Format: TBD	Score:	
24 October	Dominican Open (cancelled): Host: Puerto Plata, Dominican Republic; Venue: Polideportivo Fabio Rafael Gonzalez; Level: Future Series; Prize: $2,000; Format: TBD	Score:	
31 October	Hylo Open (Draw): Host: Saarbrücken, Germany; Venue: Saarlandhalle; Level: Super 300; Prize: $200,000; Format: 32MS/32WS/32MD/32WD/32XD	(Indonesia) Anthony Sinisuka Ginting	(Chinese Taipei) Chou Tien-chen
31 October	Hylo Open (Draw): Host: Saarbrücken, Germany; Venue: Saarlandhalle; Level: Super 300; Prize: $200,000; Format: 32MS/32WS/32MD/32WD/32XD	Score: 18–21, 21–11, 24–22	
31 October	Hylo Open (Draw): Host: Saarbrücken, Germany; Venue: Saarlandhalle; Level: Super 300; Prize: $200,000; Format: 32MS/32WS/32MD/32WD/32XD	(China) Han Yue	(China) Zhang Yiman
31 October	Hylo Open (Draw): Host: Saarbrücken, Germany; Venue: Saarlandhalle; Level: Super 300; Prize: $200,000; Format: 32MS/32WS/32MD/32WD/32XD	Score: 21–18, 21–16	
31 October	Hylo Open (Draw): Host: Saarbrücken, Germany; Venue: Saarlandhalle; Level: Super 300; Prize: $200,000; Format: 32MS/32WS/32MD/32WD/32XD	(Chinese Taipei) Lu Ching-yao (Chinese Taipei) Yang Po-han	(Chinese Taipei) Lee Jhe-huei (Chinese Taipei) Yang Po-hsuan
31 October	Hylo Open (Draw): Host: Saarbrücken, Germany; Venue: Saarlandhalle; Level: Super 300; Prize: $200,000; Format: 32MS/32WS/32MD/32WD/32XD	Score: 11–21, 21–17, 25–23	
31 October	Hylo Open (Draw): Host: Saarbrücken, Germany; Venue: Saarlandhalle; Level: Super 300; Prize: $200,000; Format: 32MS/32WS/32MD/32WD/32XD	(Thailand) Benyapa Aimsaard (Thailand) Nuntakarn Aimsaard	(Thailand) Jongkolphan Kititharakul (Thailand) Rawinda Prajongjai
31 October	Hylo Open (Draw): Host: Saarbrücken, Germany; Venue: Saarlandhalle; Level: Super 300; Prize: $200,000; Format: 32MS/32WS/32MD/32WD/32XD	Score: 21–18, 18–21, 21–17	
31 October	Hylo Open (Draw): Host: Saarbrücken, Germany; Venue: Saarlandhalle; Level: Super 300; Prize: $200,000; Format: 32MS/32WS/32MD/32WD/32XD	(Indonesia) Rehan Naufal Kusharjanto (Indonesia) Lisa Ayu Kusumawati	(China) Feng Yanzhe (China) Huang Dongping
31 October	Hylo Open (Draw): Host: Saarbrücken, Germany; Venue: Saarlandhalle; Level: Super 300; Prize: $200,000; Format: 32MS/32WS/32MD/32WD/32XD	Score: 21–17, 21–15	
31 October	Macau Open (Draw) (cancelled) (Note: This tournament, originally to be played on 1–6 November, was later cancelled due to the COVID-19 pandemic in Macau on 1 September 2022.): Host: Macau; Venue: TBD; Level: Super 300; Prize: $180,000; Format: 32MS/32WS/32MD/32WD/32XD		
31 October	Macau Open (Draw) (cancelled): Host: Macau; Venue: TBD; Level: Super 300; Prize: $180,000; Format: 32MS/32WS/32MD/32WD/32XD	Score:	
31 October	Macau Open (Draw) (cancelled): Host: Macau; Venue: TBD; Level: Super 300; Prize: $180,000; Format: 32MS/32WS/32MD/32WD/32XD	Score:	
31 October	Macau Open (Draw) (cancelled): Host: Macau; Venue: TBD; Level: Super 300; Prize: $180,000; Format: 32MS/32WS/32MD/32WD/32XD	Score:	
31 October	Macau Open (Draw) (cancelled): Host: Macau; Venue: TBD; Level: Super 300; Prize: $180,000; Format: 32MS/32WS/32MD/32WD/32XD	Score:	
31 October	Macau Open (Draw) (cancelled): Host: Macau; Venue: TBD; Level: Super 300; Prize: $180,000; Format: 32MS/32WS/32MD/32WD/32XD	Score:	
31 October	Pakistan International Challenge (cancelled) (Note: This tournament, originally to be played on 1–6 November, was later cancelled due to the COVID-19 pandemic in Pakistan.): Host: Lahore, Pakistan; Venue: Nishtar Park Sports Gymnasium; Level: International Challenge; Prize: $15,000; Format: 32MS/32WS/32MD/16WD/32XD		
31 October	Pakistan International Challenge (cancelled): Host: Lahore, Pakistan; Venue: Nishtar Park Sports Gymnasium; Level: International Challenge; Prize: $15,000; Format: 32MS/32WS/32MD/16WD/32XD	Score:	
31 October	Pakistan International Challenge (cancelled): Host: Lahore, Pakistan; Venue: Nishtar Park Sports Gymnasium; Level: International Challenge; Prize: $15,000; Format: 32MS/32WS/32MD/16WD/32XD	Score:	
31 October	Pakistan International Challenge (cancelled): Host: Lahore, Pakistan; Venue: Nishtar Park Sports Gymnasium; Level: International Challenge; Prize: $15,000; Format: 32MS/32WS/32MD/16WD/32XD	Score:	
31 October	Pakistan International Challenge (cancelled): Host: Lahore, Pakistan; Venue: Nishtar Park Sports Gymnasium; Level: International Challenge; Prize: $15,000; Format: 32MS/32WS/32MD/16WD/32XD	Score:	
31 October	Pakistan International Challenge (cancelled): Host: Lahore, Pakistan; Venue: Nishtar Park Sports Gymnasium; Level: International Challenge; Prize: $15,000; Format: 32MS/32WS/32MD/16WD/32XD	Score:	
31 October	Vietnam International Series: Host: Da Nang, Vietnam; Venue: Tien Son Sports Complex; Level: International Series; Prize: $5,000; Format: 32MS/32WS/32MD/16WD/32XD	(China) Liu Liang	(China) Lei Lanxi
31 October	Vietnam International Series: Host: Da Nang, Vietnam; Venue: Tien Son Sports Complex; Level: International Series; Prize: $5,000; Format: 32MS/32WS/32MD/16WD/32XD	Score: 21–10, 14–21, 21–18	
31 October	Vietnam International Series: Host: Da Nang, Vietnam; Venue: Tien Son Sports Complex; Level: International Series; Prize: $5,000; Format: 32MS/32WS/32MD/16WD/32XD	(Vietnam) Nguyễn Thùy Linh	(Vietnam) Vũ Thị Trang
31 October	Vietnam International Series: Host: Da Nang, Vietnam; Venue: Tien Son Sports Complex; Level: International Series; Prize: $5,000; Format: 32MS/32WS/32MD/16WD/32XD	Score: 21–15, 21–9	
31 October	Vietnam International Series: Host: Da Nang, Vietnam; Venue: Tien Son Sports Complex; Level: International Series; Prize: $5,000; Format: 32MS/32WS/32MD/16WD/32XD	(China) Chen Boyang (China) Liu Yi	(Philippines) Christian Bernardo (Philippines) Alvin Morada
31 October	Vietnam International Series: Host: Da Nang, Vietnam; Venue: Tien Son Sports Complex; Level: International Series; Prize: $5,000; Format: 32MS/32WS/32MD/16WD/32XD	Score: 21–17, 25–23	
31 October	Vietnam International Series: Host: Da Nang, Vietnam; Venue: Tien Son Sports Complex; Level: International Series; Prize: $5,000; Format: 32MS/32WS/32MD/16WD/32XD	(China) Li Yijing (China) Luo Xumin	(Vietnam) Nguyễn Thị Ngọc Lan (Vietnam) Thân Vân Anh
31 October	Vietnam International Series: Host: Da Nang, Vietnam; Venue: Tien Son Sports Complex; Level: International Series; Prize: $5,000; Format: 32MS/32WS/32MD/16WD/32XD	Score: 21–12, 21–11	
31 October	Vietnam International Series: Host: Da Nang, Vietnam; Venue: Tien Son Sports Complex; Level: International Series; Prize: $5,000; Format: 32MS/32WS/32MD/16WD/32XD	(China) Jiang Zhenbang (China) Wei Yaxin	(China) Cheng Xing (China) Chen Fanghui
31 October	Vietnam International Series: Host: Da Nang, Vietnam; Venue: Tien Son Sports Complex; Level: International Series; Prize: $5,000; Format: 32MS/32WS/32MD/16WD/32XD	Score: 21–14, 21–11	
31 October	Hungarian International: Host: Budaors, Hungary; Venue: Budaors Sportshall; Level: International Series; Prize: $5,000; Format: 32MS/32WS/32MD/16WD/32XD		
31 October	Hungarian International: Host: Budaors, Hungary; Venue: Budaors Sportshall; Level: International Series; Prize: $5,000; Format: 32MS/32WS/32MD/16WD/32XD	(Chinese Taipei) Lee Chia-hao	(Chinese Taipei) Lin Chun-yi
31 October	Hungarian International: Host: Budaors, Hungary; Venue: Budaors Sportshall; Level: International Series; Prize: $5,000; Format: 32MS/32WS/32MD/16WD/32XD	Score: 21–9, 21–14	
31 October	Hungarian International: Host: Budaors, Hungary; Venue: Budaors Sportshall; Level: International Series; Prize: $5,000; Format: 32MS/32WS/32MD/16WD/32XD	(Bulgaria) Kaloyana Nalbantova	(Denmark) Frederikke Lund
31 October	Hungarian International: Host: Budaors, Hungary; Venue: Budaors Sportshall; Level: International Series; Prize: $5,000; Format: 32MS/32WS/32MD/16WD/32XD	Score: 16–21, 21–13, 21–19	
31 October	Hungarian International: Host: Budaors, Hungary; Venue: Budaors Sportshall; Level: International Series; Prize: $5,000; Format: 32MS/32WS/32MD/16WD/32XD	(Chinese Taipei) Lin Yu-chieh (Chinese Taipei) Su Li-wei	(Denmark) Andreas Søndergaard (Denmark) Mads Thøgersen
31 October	Hungarian International: Host: Budaors, Hungary; Venue: Budaors Sportshall; Level: International Series; Prize: $5,000; Format: 32MS/32WS/32MD/16WD/32XD	Score: 21–12, 21–19	
31 October	Hungarian International: Host: Budaors, Hungary; Venue: Budaors Sportshall; Level: International Series; Prize: $5,000; Format: 32MS/32WS/32MD/16WD/32XD	(England) Abbygael Harris (England) Annie Lado	(England) Lizzie Tolman (England) Hope Warner
31 October	Hungarian International: Host: Budaors, Hungary; Venue: Budaors Sportshall; Level: International Series; Prize: $5,000; Format: 32MS/32WS/32MD/16WD/32XD	Score: 21–16, 16–21, 22–20	
31 October	Hungarian International: Host: Budaors, Hungary; Venue: Budaors Sportshall; Level: International Series; Prize: $5,000; Format: 32MS/32WS/32MD/16WD/32XD	(Netherlands) Brian Wassink (Netherlands) Alyssa Tirtosentono	(England) Steven Stallwood (England) Hope Warner
31 October	Hungarian International: Host: Budaors, Hungary; Venue: Budaors Sportshall; Level: International Series; Prize: $5,000; Format: 32MS/32WS/32MD/16WD/32XD	Score: 24–22, 16–21, 21–13	

=== November ===
Week commencing	Tournament	Champions	Runners-up
7 November	Hong Kong Open (Draw) (cancelled) (Note: This tournament, originally to be played on 8–13 November, was later cancelled due to the COVID-19 pandemic in Hong Kong on 1 September 2022.): Host: Kowloon, Hong Kong; Venue: Hong Kong Coliseum; Level: Super 500; Prize: $400,000; Format: 32MS/32WS/32MD/32WD/32XD		
7 November	Hong Kong Open (Draw) (cancelled): Host: Kowloon, Hong Kong; Venue: Hong Kong Coliseum; Level: Super 500; Prize: $400,000; Format: 32MS/32WS/32MD/32WD/32XD	Score:	
7 November	Hong Kong Open (Draw) (cancelled): Host: Kowloon, Hong Kong; Venue: Hong Kong Coliseum; Level: Super 500; Prize: $400,000; Format: 32MS/32WS/32MD/32WD/32XD	Score:	
7 November	Hong Kong Open (Draw) (cancelled): Host: Kowloon, Hong Kong; Venue: Hong Kong Coliseum; Level: Super 500; Prize: $400,000; Format: 32MS/32WS/32MD/32WD/32XD	Score:	
7 November	Hong Kong Open (Draw) (cancelled): Host: Kowloon, Hong Kong; Venue: Hong Kong Coliseum; Level: Super 500; Prize: $400,000; Format: 32MS/32WS/32MD/32WD/32XD	Score:	
7 November	Hong Kong Open (Draw) (cancelled): Host: Kowloon, Hong Kong; Venue: Hong Kong Coliseum; Level: Super 500; Prize: $400,000; Format: 32MS/32WS/32MD/32WD/32XD	Score:	
7 November	Malaysia International Series: Host: Ipoh, Malaysia; Venue: Arena Badminton Perak; Level: International Series; Prize: $10,000; Format: 64MS/32WS/32MD/32WD/32XD	(Indonesia) Syabda Perkasa Belawa	(China) Lei Lanxi
7 November	Malaysia International Series: Host: Ipoh, Malaysia; Venue: Arena Badminton Perak; Level: International Series; Prize: $10,000; Format: 64MS/32WS/32MD/32WD/32XD	Score: 21–17, 21–18	
7 November	Malaysia International Series: Host: Ipoh, Malaysia; Venue: Arena Badminton Perak; Level: International Series; Prize: $10,000; Format: 64MS/32WS/32MD/32WD/32XD	(China) Gao Fangjie	(Chinese Taipei) Chiu Pin-chian
7 November	Malaysia International Series: Host: Ipoh, Malaysia; Venue: Arena Badminton Perak; Level: International Series; Prize: $10,000; Format: 64MS/32WS/32MD/32WD/32XD	Score: 21–10, 21–16	
7 November	Malaysia International Series: Host: Ipoh, Malaysia; Venue: Arena Badminton Perak; Level: International Series; Prize: $10,000; Format: 64MS/32WS/32MD/32WD/32XD	(China) Chen Boyang (China) Liu Yi	(Malaysia) Beh Chun Meng (Malaysia) Goh Boon Zhe
7 November	Malaysia International Series: Host: Ipoh, Malaysia; Venue: Arena Badminton Perak; Level: International Series; Prize: $10,000; Format: 64MS/32WS/32MD/32WD/32XD	Score: 21–11, 21–13	
7 November	Malaysia International Series: Host: Ipoh, Malaysia; Venue: Arena Badminton Perak; Level: International Series; Prize: $10,000; Format: 64MS/32WS/32MD/32WD/32XD	(China) Liu Shengshu (China) Tan Ning	(China) Li Yijing (China) Luo Xumin
7 November	Malaysia International Series: Host: Ipoh, Malaysia; Venue: Arena Badminton Perak; Level: International Series; Prize: $10,000; Format: 64MS/32WS/32MD/32WD/32XD	Score: 24–22, 21–16	
7 November	Malaysia International Series: Host: Ipoh, Malaysia; Venue: Arena Badminton Perak; Level: International Series; Prize: $10,000; Format: 64MS/32WS/32MD/32WD/32XD	(China) Cheng Xing (China) Chen Fanghui	(China) Jiang Zhenbang (China) Wei Yaxin
7 November	Malaysia International Series: Host: Ipoh, Malaysia; Venue: Arena Badminton Perak; Level: International Series; Prize: $10,000; Format: 64MS/32WS/32MD/32WD/32XD	Score: 26–24, 21–18	
7 November	Norwegian International: Host: Sandefjord, Norway; Venue: Jotunhallen; Level: International Series; Prize: $5,000; Format: 32MS/32WS/32MD/16WD/32XD	(Chinese Taipei) Lin Chun-yi	(Chinese Taipei) Lee Chia-hao
7 November	Norwegian International: Host: Sandefjord, Norway; Venue: Jotunhallen; Level: International Series; Prize: $5,000; Format: 32MS/32WS/32MD/16WD/32XD	Score: 21–12, 21–11	
7 November	Norwegian International: Host: Sandefjord, Norway; Venue: Jotunhallen; Level: International Series; Prize: $5,000; Format: 32MS/32WS/32MD/16WD/32XD	(Japan) Natsuki Nidaira	(Japan) Riko Gunji
7 November	Norwegian International: Host: Sandefjord, Norway; Venue: Jotunhallen; Level: International Series; Prize: $5,000; Format: 32MS/32WS/32MD/16WD/32XD	Score: 14–21, 21–18, 21–16	
7 November	Norwegian International: Host: Sandefjord, Norway; Venue: Jotunhallen; Level: International Series; Prize: $5,000; Format: 32MS/32WS/32MD/16WD/32XD	(Chinese Taipei) Chen Zhi-ray (Chinese Taipei) Lu Chen	(Japan) Ayato Endo (Japan) Yuta Takei
7 November	Norwegian International: Host: Sandefjord, Norway; Venue: Jotunhallen; Level: International Series; Prize: $5,000; Format: 32MS/32WS/32MD/16WD/32XD	Score: 21–19, 21–19	
7 November	Norwegian International: Host: Sandefjord, Norway; Venue: Jotunhallen; Level: International Series; Prize: $5,000; Format: 32MS/32WS/32MD/16WD/32XD	(Chinese Taipei) Chang Ching-hui (Chinese Taipei) Yang Ching-tun	(Sweden) Clara Nistad (Sweden) Jessica Silvennoinen
7 November	Norwegian International: Host: Sandefjord, Norway; Venue: Jotunhallen; Level: International Series; Prize: $5,000; Format: 32MS/32WS/32MD/16WD/32XD	Score: 14–21, 21–12, 21–15	
7 November	Norwegian International: Host: Sandefjord, Norway; Venue: Jotunhallen; Level: International Series; Prize: $5,000; Format: 32MS/32WS/32MD/16WD/32XD	(France) Lucas Corvée (France) Sharone Bauer	(Serbia) Mihajlo Tomić (Serbia) Andjela Vitman
7 November	Norwegian International: Host: Sandefjord, Norway; Venue: Jotunhallen; Level: International Series; Prize: $5,000; Format: 32MS/32WS/32MD/16WD/32XD	Score: 21–19, 13–21, 21–13	
7 November	Guatemala Future Series: Host: Guatemala City, Guatemala; Venue: Gimnasio Teodoro Palacios Flores; Level: Future Series; Format: 32MS/16WS/16MD/8WD/16XD	(Japan) Yuta Kikuchi	(France) Tino Daoudal
7 November	Guatemala Future Series: Host: Guatemala City, Guatemala; Venue: Gimnasio Teodoro Palacios Flores; Level: Future Series; Format: 32MS/16WS/16MD/8WD/16XD	Score: 21–13, 21–16	
7 November	Guatemala Future Series: Host: Guatemala City, Guatemala; Venue: Gimnasio Teodoro Palacios Flores; Level: Future Series; Format: 32MS/16WS/16MD/8WD/16XD	(France) Malya Hoareau	(Colombia) Juliana Giraldo
7 November	Guatemala Future Series: Host: Guatemala City, Guatemala; Venue: Gimnasio Teodoro Palacios Flores; Level: Future Series; Format: 32MS/16WS/16MD/8WD/16XD	Score: 21–14, 21–18	
7 November	Guatemala Future Series: Host: Guatemala City, Guatemala; Venue: Gimnasio Teodoro Palacios Flores; Level: Future Series; Format: 32MS/16WS/16MD/8WD/16XD	(Guatemala) José Granados (Guatemala) Antonio Ortíz	(El Salvador) Manuel Mejía (El Salvador) Kennet Suria
7 November	Guatemala Future Series: Host: Guatemala City, Guatemala; Venue: Gimnasio Teodoro Palacios Flores; Level: Future Series; Format: 32MS/16WS/16MD/8WD/16XD	Score: 21–9, 21–19	
7 November	Guatemala Future Series: Host: Guatemala City, Guatemala; Venue: Gimnasio Teodoro Palacios Flores; Level: Future Series; Format: 32MS/16WS/16MD/8WD/16XD	(Guatemala) Alejandra Paiz (Guatemala) Mariana Paiz	(El Salvador) Fátima Centeno (El Salvador) Daniela Hernández
7 November	Guatemala Future Series: Host: Guatemala City, Guatemala; Venue: Gimnasio Teodoro Palacios Flores; Level: Future Series; Format: 32MS/16WS/16MD/8WD/16XD	Score: 21–16, 21–14	
7 November	Guatemala Future Series: Host: Guatemala City, Guatemala; Venue: Gimnasio Teodoro Palacios Flores; Level: Future Series; Format: 32MS/16WS/16MD/8WD/16XD	(France) Tino Daoudal (France) Malya Hoareau	(Guatemala) Christopher Martínez (Guatemala) Mariana Paiz
7 November	Guatemala Future Series: Host: Guatemala City, Guatemala; Venue: Gimnasio Teodoro Palacios Flores; Level: Future Series; Format: 32MS/16WS/16MD/8WD/16XD	Score: 18–21, 21–17, 21–19	
14 November	Australian Open (Draw): Host: Sydney, Australia; Venue: State Sports Centre; Level: Super 300; Prize: $180,000; Format: 32MS/32WS/32MD/32WD/32XD	(China) Shi Yuqi	(China) Lu Guangzu
14 November	Australian Open (Draw): Host: Sydney, Australia; Venue: State Sports Centre; Level: Super 300; Prize: $180,000; Format: 32MS/32WS/32MD/32WD/32XD	Score: 21–19, 18–21, 21–5	
14 November	Australian Open (Draw): Host: Sydney, Australia; Venue: State Sports Centre; Level: Super 300; Prize: $180,000; Format: 32MS/32WS/32MD/32WD/32XD	(South Korea) An Se-young	(Indonesia) Gregoria Mariska Tunjung
14 November	Australian Open (Draw): Host: Sydney, Australia; Venue: State Sports Centre; Level: Super 300; Prize: $180,000; Format: 32MS/32WS/32MD/32WD/32XD	Score: 21–17, 21–9	
14 November	Australian Open (Draw): Host: Sydney, Australia; Venue: State Sports Centre; Level: Super 300; Prize: $180,000; Format: 32MS/32WS/32MD/32WD/32XD	(China) Liu Yuchen (China) Ou Xuanyi	(Malaysia) Ong Yew Sin (Malaysia) Teo Ee Yi
14 November	Australian Open (Draw): Host: Sydney, Australia; Venue: State Sports Centre; Level: Super 300; Prize: $180,000; Format: 32MS/32WS/32MD/32WD/32XD	Score: 21–16, 22–20	
14 November	Australian Open (Draw): Host: Sydney, Australia; Venue: State Sports Centre; Level: Super 300; Prize: $180,000; Format: 32MS/32WS/32MD/32WD/32XD	(China) Zhang Shuxian (China) Zheng Yu	(Thailand) Benyapa Aimsaard (Thailand) Nuntakarn Aimsaard
14 November	Australian Open (Draw): Host: Sydney, Australia; Venue: State Sports Centre; Level: Super 300; Prize: $180,000; Format: 32MS/32WS/32MD/32WD/32XD	Score: 21–19, 21–13	
14 November	Australian Open (Draw): Host: Sydney, Australia; Venue: State Sports Centre; Level: Super 300; Prize: $180,000; Format: 32MS/32WS/32MD/32WD/32XD	(South Korea) Seo Seung-jae (South Korea) Chae Yoo-jung	(South Korea) Kim Won-ho (South Korea) Jeong Na-eun
14 November	Australian Open (Draw): Host: Sydney, Australia; Venue: State Sports Centre; Level: Super 300; Prize: $180,000; Format: 32MS/32WS/32MD/32WD/32XD	Score: 21–9, 21–17	
14 November	Jakarta Indonesia International Challenge (cancelled) (Note: This tournament, originally to be played on 15–20 November, was later cancelled due to the COVID-19 pandemic in Indonesia.): Host: Jakarta, Indonesia; Venue: TBD; Level: International Challenge; Prize: $15,000; Format: 32MS/32WS/32MD/32WD/32XD		
14 November	Jakarta Indonesia International Challenge (cancelled): Host: Jakarta, Indonesia; Venue: TBD; Level: International Challenge; Prize: $15,000; Format: 32MS/32WS/32MD/32WD/32XD	Score:	
14 November	Jakarta Indonesia International Challenge (cancelled): Host: Jakarta, Indonesia; Venue: TBD; Level: International Challenge; Prize: $15,000; Format: 32MS/32WS/32MD/32WD/32XD	Score:	
14 November	Jakarta Indonesia International Challenge (cancelled): Host: Jakarta, Indonesia; Venue: TBD; Level: International Challenge; Prize: $15,000; Format: 32MS/32WS/32MD/32WD/32XD	Score:	
14 November	Jakarta Indonesia International Challenge (cancelled): Host: Jakarta, Indonesia; Venue: TBD; Level: International Challenge; Prize: $15,000; Format: 32MS/32WS/32MD/32WD/32XD	Score:	
14 November	Jakarta Indonesia International Challenge (cancelled): Host: Jakarta, Indonesia; Venue: TBD; Level: International Challenge; Prize: $15,000; Format: 32MS/32WS/32MD/32WD/32XD	Score:	
14 November	Irish Open: Host: Dublin, Republic of Ireland; Venue: National Indoor Arena; Level: International Challenge; Prize: $15,000; Format: 32MS/32WS/32MD/32WD/32XD	(Denmark) Magnus Johannesen	(Chinese Taipei) Lin Chun-yi
14 November	Irish Open: Host: Dublin, Republic of Ireland; Venue: National Indoor Arena; Level: International Challenge; Prize: $15,000; Format: 32MS/32WS/32MD/32WD/32XD	Score: 21–14, 21–17	
14 November	Irish Open: Host: Dublin, Republic of Ireland; Venue: National Indoor Arena; Level: International Challenge; Prize: $15,000; Format: 32MS/32WS/32MD/32WD/32XD	(Japan) Riko Gunji	(Japan) Natsuki Nidaira
14 November	Irish Open: Host: Dublin, Republic of Ireland; Venue: National Indoor Arena; Level: International Challenge; Prize: $15,000; Format: 32MS/32WS/32MD/32WD/32XD	Score: 21–13, 21–11	
14 November	Irish Open: Host: Dublin, Republic of Ireland; Venue: National Indoor Arena; Level: International Challenge; Prize: $15,000; Format: 32MS/32WS/32MD/32WD/32XD	(Japan) Ayato Endo (Japan) Yuta Takei	(Denmark) Rasmus Kjær (Denmark) Frederik Søgaard
14 November	Irish Open: Host: Dublin, Republic of Ireland; Venue: National Indoor Arena; Level: International Challenge; Prize: $15,000; Format: 32MS/32WS/32MD/32WD/32XD	Score: 21–18, 21–12	
14 November	Irish Open: Host: Dublin, Republic of Ireland; Venue: National Indoor Arena; Level: International Challenge; Prize: $15,000; Format: 32MS/32WS/32MD/32WD/32XD	(Chinese Taipei) Chang Ching-hui (Chinese Taipei) Yang Ching-tun	(Denmark) Christine Busch (Denmark) Amalie Schulz
14 November	Irish Open: Host: Dublin, Republic of Ireland; Venue: National Indoor Arena; Level: International Challenge; Prize: $15,000; Format: 32MS/32WS/32MD/32WD/32XD	Score: 19–21, 21–12, 21–19	
14 November	Irish Open: Host: Dublin, Republic of Ireland; Venue: National Indoor Arena; Level: International Challenge; Prize: $15,000; Format: 32MS/32WS/32MD/32WD/32XD	(England) Gregory Mairs (England) Jenny Moore	(Denmark) Andreas Søndergaard (Denmark) Iben Bergstein
14 November	Irish Open: Host: Dublin, Republic of Ireland; Venue: National Indoor Arena; Level: International Challenge; Prize: $15,000; Format: 32MS/32WS/32MD/32WD/32XD	Score: 21–13, 21–16	
14 November	Peru Challenge: Host: Lima, Peru; Venue: Filial Villa Deportiva - Club Regatas Lima; Level: International Challenge; Prize: $15,000; Format: 32MS/32WS/32MD/32WD/32XD	(Canada) Jason Ho-Shue	(Spain) Luís Enrique Peñalver
14 November	Peru Challenge: Host: Lima, Peru; Venue: Filial Villa Deportiva - Club Regatas Lima; Level: International Challenge; Prize: $15,000; Format: 32MS/32WS/32MD/32WD/32XD	Score: 21–19, 21–23, 23–21	
14 November	Peru Challenge: Host: Lima, Peru; Venue: Filial Villa Deportiva - Club Regatas Lima; Level: International Challenge; Prize: $15,000; Format: 32MS/32WS/32MD/32WD/32XD	(Japan) Kaoru Sugiyama	(Spain) Clara Azurmendi
14 November	Peru Challenge: Host: Lima, Peru; Venue: Filial Villa Deportiva - Club Regatas Lima; Level: International Challenge; Prize: $15,000; Format: 32MS/32WS/32MD/32WD/32XD	Score: 15–13 retired	
14 November	Peru Challenge: Host: Lima, Peru; Venue: Filial Villa Deportiva - Club Regatas Lima; Level: International Challenge; Prize: $15,000; Format: 32MS/32WS/32MD/32WD/32XD	(Canada) Jason Ho-Shue (Canada) Joshua Hurlburt-Yu	(Canada) Adam Dong (Canada) Nyl Yakura
14 November	Peru Challenge: Host: Lima, Peru; Venue: Filial Villa Deportiva - Club Regatas Lima; Level: International Challenge; Prize: $15,000; Format: 32MS/32WS/32MD/32WD/32XD	Score: 21–15, 18–21, 21–12	
14 November	Peru Challenge: Host: Lima, Peru; Venue: Filial Villa Deportiva - Club Regatas Lima; Level: International Challenge; Prize: $15,000; Format: 32MS/32WS/32MD/32WD/32XD	(United States) Paula Lynn Cao Hok (United States) Lauren Lam	(United States) Annie Xu (United States) Kerry Xu
14 November	Peru Challenge: Host: Lima, Peru; Venue: Filial Villa Deportiva - Club Regatas Lima; Level: International Challenge; Prize: $15,000; Format: 32MS/32WS/32MD/32WD/32XD	Score: 21–19, 21–18	
14 November	Peru Challenge: Host: Lima, Peru; Venue: Filial Villa Deportiva - Club Regatas Lima; Level: International Challenge; Prize: $15,000; Format: 32MS/32WS/32MD/32WD/32XD	(United States) Vinson Chiu (United States) Jennie Gai	(Canada) Ty Alexander Lindeman (Canada) Josephine Wu
14 November	Peru Challenge: Host: Lima, Peru; Venue: Filial Villa Deportiva - Club Regatas Lima; Level: International Challenge; Prize: $15,000; Format: 32MS/32WS/32MD/32WD/32XD	Score: 22–20, 13–21, 23–21	
14 November	Zambia International: Host: Lusaka, Zambia; Venue: OYDC Zambia - Sports Development Centre; Level: Future Series; Format: 32MS/32WS/16MD/16WD/32XD	(Kazakhstan) Dmitriy Panarin	(Nigeria) Anuoluwapo Juwon Opeyori
14 November	Zambia International: Host: Lusaka, Zambia; Venue: OYDC Zambia - Sports Development Centre; Level: Future Series; Format: 32MS/32WS/16MD/16WD/32XD	Score: 21–9, 21–10	
14 November	Zambia International: Host: Lusaka, Zambia; Venue: OYDC Zambia - Sports Development Centre; Level: Future Series; Format: 32MS/32WS/16MD/16WD/32XD	(Azerbaijan) Keisha Fatimah Azzahra	(Azerbaijan) Era Maftuha
14 November	Zambia International: Host: Lusaka, Zambia; Venue: OYDC Zambia - Sports Development Centre; Level: Future Series; Format: 32MS/32WS/16MD/16WD/32XD	Score: 21–12, 21–16	
14 November	Zambia International: Host: Lusaka, Zambia; Venue: OYDC Zambia - Sports Development Centre; Level: Future Series; Format: 32MS/32WS/16MD/16WD/32XD	(South Africa) Jarred Elliott (South Africa) Robert Summers	(Zambia) Mwanza Edward (Zambia) Timothy Kafunda
14 November	Zambia International: Host: Lusaka, Zambia; Venue: OYDC Zambia - Sports Development Centre; Level: Future Series; Format: 32MS/32WS/16MD/16WD/32XD	Score: 21–9, 21–10	
14 November	Zambia International: Host: Lusaka, Zambia; Venue: OYDC Zambia - Sports Development Centre; Level: Future Series; Format: 32MS/32WS/16MD/16WD/32XD	(Azerbaijan) Keisha Fatimah Azzahra (Azerbaijan) Era Maftuha	(South Africa) Amy Ackerman (South Africa) Deidre Laurens Jordaan
14 November	Zambia International: Host: Lusaka, Zambia; Venue: OYDC Zambia - Sports Development Centre; Level: Future Series; Format: 32MS/32WS/16MD/16WD/32XD	Score: 21–12, 21–8	
14 November	Zambia International: Host: Lusaka, Zambia; Venue: OYDC Zambia - Sports Development Centre; Level: Future Series; Format: 32MS/32WS/16MD/16WD/32XD	(Jordan) Bahaedeen Ahmad Alshannik (Jordan) Domou Amro	(South Africa) Jarred Elliott (South Africa) Amy Ackerman
14 November	Zambia International: Host: Lusaka, Zambia; Venue: OYDC Zambia - Sports Development Centre; Level: Future Series; Format: 32MS/32WS/16MD/16WD/32XD	Score: 21–17, 11–21, 21–15	
21 November	New Zealand Open (Draw) (cancelled) (Note: This tournament, originally to be played on 22–27 November, was later cancelled due to the COVID-19 pandemic in New Zealand.): Host: Auckland, New Zealand; Venue: Eventfinda Stadium; Level: Super 300; Prize: $180,000; Format: 32MS/32WS/32MD/32WD/32XD		
21 November	New Zealand Open (Draw) (cancelled): Host: Auckland, New Zealand; Venue: Eventfinda Stadium; Level: Super 300; Prize: $180,000; Format: 32MS/32WS/32MD/32WD/32XD	Score:	
21 November	New Zealand Open (Draw) (cancelled): Host: Auckland, New Zealand; Venue: Eventfinda Stadium; Level: Super 300; Prize: $180,000; Format: 32MS/32WS/32MD/32WD/32XD	Score:	
21 November	New Zealand Open (Draw) (cancelled): Host: Auckland, New Zealand; Venue: Eventfinda Stadium; Level: Super 300; Prize: $180,000; Format: 32MS/32WS/32MD/32WD/32XD	Score:	
21 November	New Zealand Open (Draw) (cancelled): Host: Auckland, New Zealand; Venue: Eventfinda Stadium; Level: Super 300; Prize: $180,000; Format: 32MS/32WS/32MD/32WD/32XD	Score:	
21 November	New Zealand Open (Draw) (cancelled): Host: Auckland, New Zealand; Venue: Eventfinda Stadium; Level: Super 300; Prize: $180,000; Format: 32MS/32WS/32MD/32WD/32XD	Score:	
21 November	Bahrain International Series: Host: Manama, Bahrain; Venue: India Club Bahrain; Level: International Series; Prize: $5,000; Format: 32MS/16WS/16MD/16WD/16XD	(Germany) Kai Schäfer	(Finland) Kalle Koljonen
21 November	Bahrain International Series: Host: Manama, Bahrain; Venue: India Club Bahrain; Level: International Series; Prize: $5,000; Format: 32MS/16WS/16MD/16WD/16XD	Score: 21–14, 21–14	
21 November	Bahrain International Series: Host: Manama, Bahrain; Venue: India Club Bahrain; Level: International Series; Prize: $5,000; Format: 32MS/16WS/16MD/16WD/16XD	(Chinese Taipei) Wang Yu-si	(Indonesia) Ester Nurumi Tri Wardoyo
21 November	Bahrain International Series: Host: Manama, Bahrain; Venue: India Club Bahrain; Level: International Series; Prize: $5,000; Format: 32MS/16WS/16MD/16WD/16XD	Score: 21–19, 21–16	
21 November	Bahrain International Series: Host: Manama, Bahrain; Venue: India Club Bahrain; Level: International Series; Prize: $5,000; Format: 32MS/16WS/16MD/16WD/16XD	(Thailand) Tanadon Punpanich (Thailand) Wachirawit Sothon	(Thailand) Pharanyu Kaosamaang (Thailand) Worrapol Thongsa-Nga
21 November	Bahrain International Series: Host: Manama, Bahrain; Venue: India Club Bahrain; Level: International Series; Prize: $5,000; Format: 32MS/16WS/16MD/16WD/16XD	Score: 21–16, 21–16	
21 November	Bahrain International Series: Host: Manama, Bahrain; Venue: India Club Bahrain; Level: International Series; Prize: $5,000; Format: 32MS/16WS/16MD/16WD/16XD	(Chinese Taipei) Liang Ting-yu (Chinese Taipei) Wu Ti-jung	(Chinese Taipei) Hsieh Pei-shan (Chinese Taipei) Tseng Yu-chi
21 November	Bahrain International Series: Host: Manama, Bahrain; Venue: India Club Bahrain; Level: International Series; Prize: $5,000; Format: 32MS/16WS/16MD/16WD/16XD	Score: 21–19, 20–22, 21–10	
21 November	Bahrain International Series: Host: Manama, Bahrain; Venue: India Club Bahrain; Level: International Series; Prize: $5,000; Format: 32MS/16WS/16MD/16WD/16XD	(England) Gregory Mairs (England) Jenny Moore	(Thailand) Ruttanapak Oupthong (Thailand) Jhenicha Sudjaipraparat
21 November	Bahrain International Series: Host: Manama, Bahrain; Venue: India Club Bahrain; Level: International Series; Prize: $5,000; Format: 32MS/16WS/16MD/16WD/16XD	Score: 21–17, 21–16	
21 November	Mexican International: Host: Cancún, Mexico; Venue: Poliforum Benito Juárez; Level: International Series; Prize: $5,000; Format: 32MS/32WS/32MD/32WD/32XD	(Guatemala) Kevin Cordón	(Brazil) Jonathan Matias
21 November	Mexican International: Host: Cancún, Mexico; Venue: Poliforum Benito Juárez; Level: International Series; Prize: $5,000; Format: 32MS/32WS/32MD/32WD/32XD	Score: 21–10, 21–13	
21 November	Mexican International: Host: Cancún, Mexico; Venue: Poliforum Benito Juárez; Level: International Series; Prize: $5,000; Format: 32MS/32WS/32MD/32WD/32XD	(United States) Lauren Lam	(Israel) Ksenia Polikarpova
21 November	Mexican International: Host: Cancún, Mexico; Venue: Poliforum Benito Juárez; Level: International Series; Prize: $5,000; Format: 32MS/32WS/32MD/32WD/32XD	Score: 21–7, 21–13	
21 November	Mexican International: Host: Cancún, Mexico; Venue: Poliforum Benito Juárez; Level: International Series; Prize: $5,000; Format: 32MS/32WS/32MD/32WD/32XD	(Czech Republic) Ondřej Král (Czech Republic) Adam Mendrek	(United States) Vinson Chiu (United States) Joshua Yuan
21 November	Mexican International: Host: Cancún, Mexico; Venue: Poliforum Benito Juárez; Level: International Series; Prize: $5,000; Format: 32MS/32WS/32MD/32WD/32XD	Score: 22–20, 21–19	
21 November	Mexican International: Host: Cancún, Mexico; Venue: Poliforum Benito Juárez; Level: International Series; Prize: $5,000; Format: 32MS/32WS/32MD/32WD/32XD	(Canada) Catherine Choi (Canada) Josephine Wu	(United States) Paula Lynn Cao Hok (United States) Lauren Lam
21 November	Mexican International: Host: Cancún, Mexico; Venue: Poliforum Benito Juárez; Level: International Series; Prize: $5,000; Format: 32MS/32WS/32MD/32WD/32XD	Score: 21–19, 21–10	
21 November	Mexican International: Host: Cancún, Mexico; Venue: Poliforum Benito Juárez; Level: International Series; Prize: $5,000; Format: 32MS/32WS/32MD/32WD/32XD	(United States) Vinson Chiu (United States) Jennie Gai	(United States) Joshua Yuan (United States) Allison Lee
21 November	Mexican International: Host: Cancún, Mexico; Venue: Poliforum Benito Juárez; Level: International Series; Prize: $5,000; Format: 32MS/32WS/32MD/32WD/32XD	Score: 21–14, 22–24, 23–21	
21 November	Slovenia Future Series: Host: Brežice, Slovenia; Venue: Sporthall Brežice; Level: Future Series; Format: 32MS/32WS/32MD/32WD/32XD	(Indonesia) Andi Fadel Muhammad	(Indonesia) Firman Abdul Kholik
21 November	Slovenia Future Series: Host: Brežice, Slovenia; Venue: Sporthall Brežice; Level: Future Series; Format: 32MS/32WS/32MD/32WD/32XD	Score: 21–19, 29–27	
21 November	Slovenia Future Series: Host: Brežice, Slovenia; Venue: Sporthall Brežice; Level: Future Series; Format: 32MS/32WS/32MD/32WD/32XD	(Japan) Tomoka Miyazaki	(Japan) Hina Akechi
21 November	Slovenia Future Series: Host: Brežice, Slovenia; Venue: Sporthall Brežice; Level: Future Series; Format: 32MS/32WS/32MD/32WD/32XD	Score: 21–14, 21–19	
21 November	Slovenia Future Series: Host: Brežice, Slovenia; Venue: Sporthall Brežice; Level: Future Series; Format: 32MS/32WS/32MD/32WD/32XD	(Denmark) Rasmus Espersen (Denmark) Kristian Kræmer	(Poland) Maksymilian Danielak (Poland) Mateusz Danielak
21 November	Slovenia Future Series: Host: Brežice, Slovenia; Venue: Sporthall Brežice; Level: Future Series; Format: 32MS/32WS/32MD/32WD/32XD	Score: 21–7, 21–15	
21 November	Slovenia Future Series: Host: Brežice, Slovenia; Venue: Sporthall Brežice; Level: Future Series; Format: 32MS/32WS/32MD/32WD/32XD	(Japan) Hina Akechi (Japan) Sorano Yoshikawa	(Japan) Rui Kiyama (Japan) Kanano Muroya
21 November	Slovenia Future Series: Host: Brežice, Slovenia; Venue: Sporthall Brežice; Level: Future Series; Format: 32MS/32WS/32MD/32WD/32XD	Score: 24–22, 21–16	
21 November	Slovenia Future Series: Host: Brežice, Slovenia; Venue: Sporthall Brežice; Level: Future Series; Format: 32MS/32WS/32MD/32WD/32XD	(Serbia) Mihajlo Tomić (Serbia) Andjela Vitman	(Slovenia) Miha Ivančič (Slovenia) Petra Polanc
21 November	Slovenia Future Series: Host: Brežice, Slovenia; Venue: Sporthall Brežice; Level: Future Series; Format: 32MS/32WS/32MD/32WD/32XD	Score: 21–12, 22–20	
21 November	Botswana International: Host: Lobatse, Botswana; Venue: Lobatse Sports Complex Indoor Hall; Level: Future Series; Format: 32MS/32WS/32MD/16WD/32XD	(Jordan) Bahaedeen Ahmad Alshannik	(Kazakhstan) Dmitriy Panarin
21 November	Botswana International: Host: Lobatse, Botswana; Venue: Lobatse Sports Complex Indoor Hall; Level: Future Series; Format: 32MS/32WS/32MD/16WD/32XD	Score: 13–21, 21–19, 21–10	
21 November	Botswana International: Host: Lobatse, Botswana; Venue: Lobatse Sports Complex Indoor Hall; Level: Future Series; Format: 32MS/32WS/32MD/16WD/32XD	(South Africa) Johanita Scholtz	(Luxembourg) Kim Schmidt
21 November	Botswana International: Host: Lobatse, Botswana; Venue: Lobatse Sports Complex Indoor Hall; Level: Future Series; Format: 32MS/32WS/32MD/16WD/32XD	Score: 21–12, 21–17	
21 November	Botswana International: Host: Lobatse, Botswana; Venue: Lobatse Sports Complex Indoor Hall; Level: Future Series; Format: 32MS/32WS/32MD/16WD/32XD	(Kazakhstan) Artur Niyazov (Kazakhstan) Dmitriy Panarin	(South Africa) Jarred Elliott (South Africa) Robert Summers
21 November	Botswana International: Host: Lobatse, Botswana; Venue: Lobatse Sports Complex Indoor Hall; Level: Future Series; Format: 32MS/32WS/32MD/16WD/32XD	Score: 22–20, 21–14	
21 November	Botswana International: Host: Lobatse, Botswana; Venue: Lobatse Sports Complex Indoor Hall; Level: Future Series; Format: 32MS/32WS/32MD/16WD/32XD	(South Africa) Amy Ackerman (South Africa) Deidre Laurens Jordaan	(Mauritius) Lorna Bodha (Mauritius) Kobita Dookhee
21 November	Botswana International: Host: Lobatse, Botswana; Venue: Lobatse Sports Complex Indoor Hall; Level: Future Series; Format: 32MS/32WS/32MD/16WD/32XD	Score: 21–10, 21–11	
21 November	Botswana International: Host: Lobatse, Botswana; Venue: Lobatse Sports Complex Indoor Hall; Level: Future Series; Format: 32MS/32WS/32MD/16WD/32XD	(South Africa) Jarred Elliott (South Africa) Amy Ackerman	(Egypt) Adham Hatem Elgamal (Egypt) Doha Hany
21 November	Botswana International: Host: Lobatse, Botswana; Venue: Lobatse Sports Complex Indoor Hall; Level: Future Series; Format: 32MS/32WS/32MD/16WD/32XD	Score: 21–12, 21–19	
28 November	China Open (Draw) (cancelled) (Note: This tournament, originally to be played on 29 November – 4 December, was later cancelled due to the COVID-19 pandemic in China.): Host: Changzhou, China; Venue: Xincheng Gymnasium; Level: Super 1000; Prize: $990,000; Format: 32MS/32WS/32MD/32WD/32XD		
28 November	China Open (Draw) (cancelled): Host: Changzhou, China; Venue: Xincheng Gymnasium; Level: Super 1000; Prize: $990,000; Format: 32MS/32WS/32MD/32WD/32XD	Score:	
28 November	China Open (Draw) (cancelled): Host: Changzhou, China; Venue: Xincheng Gymnasium; Level: Super 1000; Prize: $990,000; Format: 32MS/32WS/32MD/32WD/32XD	Score:	
28 November	China Open (Draw) (cancelled): Host: Changzhou, China; Venue: Xincheng Gymnasium; Level: Super 1000; Prize: $990,000; Format: 32MS/32WS/32MD/32WD/32XD	Score:	
28 November	China Open (Draw) (cancelled): Host: Changzhou, China; Venue: Xincheng Gymnasium; Level: Super 1000; Prize: $990,000; Format: 32MS/32WS/32MD/32WD/32XD	Score:	
28 November	China Open (Draw) (cancelled): Host: Changzhou, China; Venue: Xincheng Gymnasium; Level: Super 1000; Prize: $990,000; Format: 32MS/32WS/32MD/32WD/32XD	Score:	
28 November	Bahrain International Challenge: Host: Manama, Bahrain; Venue: BKS Club; Level: International Challenge; Prize: $15,000; Format: 32MS/16WS/16MD/16WD/16XD	(Malaysia) Ng Tze Yong	(Chinese Taipei) Kuo Kuan-lin
28 November	Bahrain International Challenge: Host: Manama, Bahrain; Venue: BKS Club; Level: International Challenge; Prize: $15,000; Format: 32MS/16WS/16MD/16WD/16XD	Score: 21–15, 20–22, 21–12	
28 November	Bahrain International Challenge: Host: Manama, Bahrain; Venue: BKS Club; Level: International Challenge; Prize: $15,000; Format: 32MS/16WS/16MD/16WD/16XD	(Thailand) Pitchamon Opatniput	(Indonesia) Ester Nurumi Tri Wardoyo
28 November	Bahrain International Challenge: Host: Manama, Bahrain; Venue: BKS Club; Level: International Challenge; Prize: $15,000; Format: 32MS/16WS/16MD/16WD/16XD	Score: 21–17, 21–16	
28 November	Bahrain International Challenge: Host: Manama, Bahrain; Venue: BKS Club; Level: International Challenge; Prize: $15,000; Format: 32MS/16WS/16MD/16WD/16XD	(Indonesia) Rayhan Fadillah (Indonesia) Rahmat Hidayat	(Thailand) Chaloempon Charoenkitamorn (Thailand) Nanthakarn Yordphaisong
28 November	Bahrain International Challenge: Host: Manama, Bahrain; Venue: BKS Club; Level: International Challenge; Prize: $15,000; Format: 32MS/16WS/16MD/16WD/16XD	Score: 21–13, 21–17	
28 November	Bahrain International Challenge: Host: Manama, Bahrain; Venue: BKS Club; Level: International Challenge; Prize: $15,000; Format: 32MS/16WS/16MD/16WD/16XD	(Indonesia) Lanny Tria Mayasari (Indonesia) Ribka Sugiarto	(India) Treesa Jolly (India) Gayatri Gopichand
28 November	Bahrain International Challenge: Host: Manama, Bahrain; Venue: BKS Club; Level: International Challenge; Prize: $15,000; Format: 32MS/16WS/16MD/16WD/16XD	Score: 21–18, 21–16	
28 November	Bahrain International Challenge: Host: Manama, Bahrain; Venue: BKS Club; Level: International Challenge; Prize: $15,000; Format: 32MS/16WS/16MD/16WD/16XD	(Thailand) Ruttanapak Oupthong (Thailand) Jhenicha Sudjaipraparat	(India) B. Sumeeth Reddy (India) K. Maneesha
28 November	Bahrain International Challenge: Host: Manama, Bahrain; Venue: BKS Club; Level: International Challenge; Prize: $15,000; Format: 32MS/16WS/16MD/16WD/16XD	Score: 22–20, 21–17	
28 November	Welsh International: Host: Cardiff, Wales; Venue: Sport Wales National Centre; Level: International Challenge; Prize: $15,000; Format: 32MS/32WS/32MD/32WD/32XD	(Denmark) Mads Christophersen	(Czech Republic) Jan Louda
28 November	Welsh International: Host: Cardiff, Wales; Venue: Sport Wales National Centre; Level: International Challenge; Prize: $15,000; Format: 32MS/32WS/32MD/32WD/32XD	Score: 21–13, 21–18	
28 November	Welsh International: Host: Cardiff, Wales; Venue: Sport Wales National Centre; Level: International Challenge; Prize: $15,000; Format: 32MS/32WS/32MD/32WD/32XD	(Germany) Yvonne Li	(Belgium) Lianne Tan
28 November	Welsh International: Host: Cardiff, Wales; Venue: Sport Wales National Centre; Level: International Challenge; Prize: $15,000; Format: 32MS/32WS/32MD/32WD/32XD	Score: 21–17, 21–12	
28 November	Welsh International: Host: Cardiff, Wales; Venue: Sport Wales National Centre; Level: International Challenge; Prize: $15,000; Format: 32MS/32WS/32MD/32WD/32XD	(Denmark) Rasmus Kjær (Denmark) Frederik Søgaard	(Denmark) Andreas Søndergaard (Denmark) Jesper Toft
28 November	Welsh International: Host: Cardiff, Wales; Venue: Sport Wales National Centre; Level: International Challenge; Prize: $15,000; Format: 32MS/32WS/32MD/32WD/32XD	Score: 21–19, 21–18	
28 November	Welsh International: Host: Cardiff, Wales; Venue: Sport Wales National Centre; Level: International Challenge; Prize: $15,000; Format: 32MS/32WS/32MD/32WD/32XD	(France) Margot Lambert (France) Anne Tran	(England) Chloe Birch (England) Lauren Smith
28 November	Welsh International: Host: Cardiff, Wales; Venue: Sport Wales National Centre; Level: International Challenge; Prize: $15,000; Format: 32MS/32WS/32MD/32WD/32XD	Score: 9–21, 21–14, 21–9	
28 November	Welsh International: Host: Cardiff, Wales; Venue: Sport Wales National Centre; Level: International Challenge; Prize: $15,000; Format: 32MS/32WS/32MD/32WD/32XD	(Denmark) Jesper Toft (Denmark) Clara Graversen	(Germany) Mark Lamsfuß (Germany) Isabel Lohau
28 November	Welsh International: Host: Cardiff, Wales; Venue: Sport Wales National Centre; Level: International Challenge; Prize: $15,000; Format: 32MS/32WS/32MD/32WD/32XD	Score: 21–18, 14–21, 21–16	
28 November	Manawatu International (cancelled) (Note: This tournament, originally to be played on 1–4 December, was later cancelled due to the COVID-19 pandemic in New Zealand.): Host: Palmerston North, New Zealand; Venue: Central Energy Trust Arena; Level: International Series; Prize: $10,000; Format: 32MS/32WS/32MD/8WD/32XD		
28 November	Manawatu International (cancelled): Host: Palmerston North, New Zealand; Venue: Central Energy Trust Arena; Level: International Series; Prize: $10,000; Format: 32MS/32WS/32MD/8WD/32XD	Score:	
28 November	Manawatu International (cancelled): Host: Palmerston North, New Zealand; Venue: Central Energy Trust Arena; Level: International Series; Prize: $10,000; Format: 32MS/32WS/32MD/8WD/32XD	Score:	
28 November	Manawatu International (cancelled): Host: Palmerston North, New Zealand; Venue: Central Energy Trust Arena; Level: International Series; Prize: $10,000; Format: 32MS/32WS/32MD/8WD/32XD	Score:	
28 November	Manawatu International (cancelled): Host: Palmerston North, New Zealand; Venue: Central Energy Trust Arena; Level: International Series; Prize: $10,000; Format: 32MS/32WS/32MD/8WD/32XD	Score:	
28 November	Manawatu International (cancelled): Host: Palmerston North, New Zealand; Venue: Central Energy Trust Arena; Level: International Series; Prize: $10,000; Format: 32MS/32WS/32MD/8WD/32XD	Score:	
28 November	El Salvador International: Host: San Salvador, El Salvador; Venue: San Francisco School; Level: International Series; Prize: $5,000; Format: 32MS/32WS/16MD/16WD/16XD	(El Salvador) Uriel Canjura	(Guatemala) Kevin Cordón
28 November	El Salvador International: Host: San Salvador, El Salvador; Venue: San Francisco School; Level: International Series; Prize: $5,000; Format: 32MS/32WS/16MD/16WD/16XD	Score: 21–18, 21–23, 21–18	
28 November	El Salvador International: Host: San Salvador, El Salvador; Venue: San Francisco School; Level: International Series; Prize: $5,000; Format: 32MS/32WS/16MD/16WD/16XD	(United States) Lauren Lam	(Spain) Ania Setien
28 November	El Salvador International: Host: San Salvador, El Salvador; Venue: San Francisco School; Level: International Series; Prize: $5,000; Format: 32MS/32WS/16MD/16WD/16XD	Score: 21–11, 21–9	
28 November	El Salvador International: Host: San Salvador, El Salvador; Venue: San Francisco School; Level: International Series; Prize: $5,000; Format: 32MS/32WS/16MD/16WD/16XD	(Canada) Kevin Lee (Canada) Ty Alexander Lindeman	(Czech Republic) Ondřej Král (Czech Republic) Adam Mendrek
28 November	El Salvador International: Host: San Salvador, El Salvador; Venue: San Francisco School; Level: International Series; Prize: $5,000; Format: 32MS/32WS/16MD/16WD/16XD	Score: 21–19, 17–21, 21–18	
28 November	El Salvador International: Host: San Salvador, El Salvador; Venue: San Francisco School; Level: International Series; Prize: $5,000; Format: 32MS/32WS/16MD/16WD/16XD	(United States) Paula Lynn Cao Hok (United States) Lauren Lam	(United States) Annie Xu (United States) Kerry Xu
28 November	El Salvador International: Host: San Salvador, El Salvador; Venue: San Francisco School; Level: International Series; Prize: $5,000; Format: 32MS/32WS/16MD/16WD/16XD	Score: 21–18, 21–17	
28 November	El Salvador International: Host: San Salvador, El Salvador; Venue: San Francisco School; Level: International Series; Prize: $5,000; Format: 32MS/32WS/16MD/16WD/16XD	(Spain) Joan Monroy (Spain) Ania Setien	(India) Tarun Kona (India) Sri Krishna Priya Kudaravalli
28 November	El Salvador International: Host: San Salvador, El Salvador; Venue: San Francisco School; Level: International Series; Prize: $5,000; Format: 32MS/32WS/16MD/16WD/16XD	Score: 21–11, 21–17	
28 November	South Africa International: Host: Cape Town, South Africa; Venue: John Tyers Hall; Level: Future Series; Format: 32MS/32WS/32MD/16WD/32XD	(Chinese Taipei) Hung Chun-chung	(Egypt) Adham Hatem Elgamal
28 November	South Africa International: Host: Cape Town, South Africa; Venue: John Tyers Hall; Level: Future Series; Format: 32MS/32WS/32MD/16WD/32XD	Score: 21–13, 20–22, 21–16	
28 November	South Africa International: Host: Cape Town, South Africa; Venue: John Tyers Hall; Level: Future Series; Format: 32MS/32WS/32MD/16WD/32XD	(Chinese Taipei) Lee Yu-hsuan	(South Africa) Johanita Scholtz
28 November	South Africa International: Host: Cape Town, South Africa; Venue: John Tyers Hall; Level: Future Series; Format: 32MS/32WS/32MD/16WD/32XD	Score: 21–8, 21–9	
28 November	South Africa International: Host: Cape Town, South Africa; Venue: John Tyers Hall; Level: Future Series; Format: 32MS/32WS/32MD/16WD/32XD	(Chinese Taipei) Lee Wen-che (Chinese Taipei) Liu Yu-che	(Chinese Taipei) Cheng Yu-yen (Chinese Taipei) Hung Chun-chung
28 November	South Africa International: Host: Cape Town, South Africa; Venue: John Tyers Hall; Level: Future Series; Format: 32MS/32WS/32MD/16WD/32XD	Score: 22–20, 15–21, 21–17	
28 November	South Africa International: Host: Cape Town, South Africa; Venue: John Tyers Hall; Level: Future Series; Format: 32MS/32WS/32MD/16WD/32XD	(Chinese Taipei) Cheng Husan-ying (Chinese Taipei) Tsai Li-yu	(Chinese Taipei) Lee Yu-hua (Chinese Taipei) Tsai Li-jie
28 November	South Africa International: Host: Cape Town, South Africa; Venue: John Tyers Hall; Level: Future Series; Format: 32MS/32WS/32MD/16WD/32XD	Score: 13–21, 21–18, 21–10	
28 November	South Africa International: Host: Cape Town, South Africa; Venue: John Tyers Hall; Level: Future Series; Format: 32MS/32WS/32MD/16WD/32XD	(Chinese Taipei) Cheng Yu-yen (Chinese Taipei) Lee Yu-hua	(Chinese Taipei) Hung Chun-chung (Chinese Taipei) Lee Yu-hsuan
28 November	South Africa International: Host: Cape Town, South Africa; Venue: John Tyers Hall; Level: Future Series; Format: 32MS/32WS/32MD/16WD/32XD	Score: 21–17, 21–17	

=== December ===
Week commencing	Tournament	Champions	Runners-up
5 December	BWF World Tour Finals (Draw): Host: Bangkok, Thailand (Note: This tournament, originally to be played on 14–18 December in Guangzhou, China, was later relocated and rescheduled due to the COVID-19 pandemic in China.); Venue: Nimibutr Arena; Level: World Tour Finals; Prize: $1,500,000; Format: 8MS/8WS/8MD/8WD/8XD	(Denmark) Viktor Axelsen	(Indonesia) Anthony Sinisuka Ginting
5 December	BWF World Tour Finals (Draw): Host: Bangkok, Thailand; Venue: Nimibutr Arena; Level: World Tour Finals; Prize: $1,500,000; Format: 8MS/8WS/8MD/8WD/8XD	Score: 21–13, 21–14	
5 December	BWF World Tour Finals (Draw): Host: Bangkok, Thailand; Venue: Nimibutr Arena; Level: World Tour Finals; Prize: $1,500,000; Format: 8MS/8WS/8MD/8WD/8XD	(Japan) Akane Yamaguchi	(Chinese Taipei) Tai Tzu-ying
5 December	BWF World Tour Finals (Draw): Host: Bangkok, Thailand; Venue: Nimibutr Arena; Level: World Tour Finals; Prize: $1,500,000; Format: 8MS/8WS/8MD/8WD/8XD	Score: 21–18, 22–20	
5 December	BWF World Tour Finals (Draw): Host: Bangkok, Thailand; Venue: Nimibutr Arena; Level: World Tour Finals; Prize: $1,500,000; Format: 8MS/8WS/8MD/8WD/8XD	(China) Liu Yuchen (China) Ou Xuanyi	(Indonesia) Mohammad Ahsan (Indonesia) Hendra Setiawan
5 December	BWF World Tour Finals (Draw): Host: Bangkok, Thailand; Venue: Nimibutr Arena; Level: World Tour Finals; Prize: $1,500,000; Format: 8MS/8WS/8MD/8WD/8XD	Score: 21–17, 19–21, 21–12	
5 December	BWF World Tour Finals (Draw): Host: Bangkok, Thailand; Venue: Nimibutr Arena; Level: World Tour Finals; Prize: $1,500,000; Format: 8MS/8WS/8MD/8WD/8XD	(China) Chen Qingchen (China) Jia Yifan	(Thailand) Benyapa Aimsaard (Thailand) Nuntakarn Aimsaard
5 December	BWF World Tour Finals (Draw): Host: Bangkok, Thailand; Venue: Nimibutr Arena; Level: World Tour Finals; Prize: $1,500,000; Format: 8MS/8WS/8MD/8WD/8XD	Score: 21–13, 21–14	
5 December	BWF World Tour Finals (Draw): Host: Bangkok, Thailand; Venue: Nimibutr Arena; Level: World Tour Finals; Prize: $1,500,000; Format: 8MS/8WS/8MD/8WD/8XD	(China) Zheng Siwei (China) Huang Yaqiong	(Thailand) Dechapol Puavaranukroh (Thailand) Sapsiree Taerattanachai
5 December	BWF World Tour Finals (Draw): Host: Bangkok, Thailand; Venue: Nimibutr Arena; Level: World Tour Finals; Prize: $1,500,000; Format: 8MS/8WS/8MD/8WD/8XD	Score: 21–19, 18–21, 21–13	
5 December	Fuzhou China Open (Draw) (cancelled) (Note: This tournament, originally to be played on 6–11 December, was later cancelled due to the COVID-19 pandemic in China.): Host: Fuzhou, China; Venue: Haixia Olympic Sports Center; Level: Super 750; Prize: $675,000; Format: 32MS/32WS/32MD/32WD/32XD		
5 December	Fuzhou China Open (Draw) (cancelled): Host: Fuzhou, China; Venue: Haixia Olympic Sports Center; Level: Super 750; Prize: $675,000; Format: 32MS/32WS/32MD/32WD/32XD	Score:	
5 December	Fuzhou China Open (Draw) (cancelled): Host: Fuzhou, China; Venue: Haixia Olympic Sports Center; Level: Super 750; Prize: $675,000; Format: 32MS/32WS/32MD/32WD/32XD	Score:	
5 December	Fuzhou China Open (Draw) (cancelled): Host: Fuzhou, China; Venue: Haixia Olympic Sports Center; Level: Super 750; Prize: $675,000; Format: 32MS/32WS/32MD/32WD/32XD	Score:	
5 December	Fuzhou China Open (Draw) (cancelled): Host: Fuzhou, China; Venue: Haixia Olympic Sports Center; Level: Super 750; Prize: $675,000; Format: 32MS/32WS/32MD/32WD/32XD	Score:	
5 December	Fuzhou China Open (Draw) (cancelled): Host: Fuzhou, China; Venue: Haixia Olympic Sports Center; Level: Super 750; Prize: $675,000; Format: 32MS/32WS/32MD/32WD/32XD	Score:	
5 December	Bangladesh International: Host: Dhaka, Bangladesh; Venue: Shahid Tajuddin Ahmed Indoor Stadium; Level: International Challenge; Prize: $15,000; Format: 32MS/32WS/32MD/32WD/32XD	(India) Mithun Manjunath	(India) Priyanshu Rajawat
5 December	Bangladesh International: Host: Dhaka, Bangladesh; Venue: Shahid Tajuddin Ahmed Indoor Stadium; Level: International Challenge; Prize: $15,000; Format: 32MS/32WS/32MD/32WD/32XD	Score: 21–12, 16–21, 21–9	
5 December	Bangladesh International: Host: Dhaka, Bangladesh; Venue: Shahid Tajuddin Ahmed Indoor Stadium; Level: International Challenge; Prize: $15,000; Format: 32MS/32WS/32MD/32WD/32XD	(India) Aakarshi Kashyap	(India) Ashmita Chaliha
5 December	Bangladesh International: Host: Dhaka, Bangladesh; Venue: Shahid Tajuddin Ahmed Indoor Stadium; Level: International Challenge; Prize: $15,000; Format: 32MS/32WS/32MD/32WD/32XD	Score: 21–15, 21–13	
5 December	Bangladesh International: Host: Dhaka, Bangladesh; Venue: Shahid Tajuddin Ahmed Indoor Stadium; Level: International Challenge; Prize: $15,000; Format: 32MS/32WS/32MD/32WD/32XD	(Thailand) Pharanyu Kaosamaang (Thailand) Worrapol Thongsa-Nga	(Philippines) Christian Bernardo (Philippines) Alvin Morada
5 December	Bangladesh International: Host: Dhaka, Bangladesh; Venue: Shahid Tajuddin Ahmed Indoor Stadium; Level: International Challenge; Prize: $15,000; Format: 32MS/32WS/32MD/32WD/32XD	Score: 18–21, 21–10, 21–19	
5 December	Bangladesh International: Host: Dhaka, Bangladesh; Venue: Shahid Tajuddin Ahmed Indoor Stadium; Level: International Challenge; Prize: $15,000; Format: 32MS/32WS/32MD/32WD/32XD	(Thailand) Laksika Kanlaha (Thailand) Phataimas Muenwong	(Thailand) Supamart Mingchua (Thailand) Pattaraporn Rungruengpramong
5 December	Bangladesh International: Host: Dhaka, Bangladesh; Venue: Shahid Tajuddin Ahmed Indoor Stadium; Level: International Challenge; Prize: $15,000; Format: 32MS/32WS/32MD/32WD/32XD	Score: 21–13, 21–16	
5 December	Bangladesh International: Host: Dhaka, Bangladesh; Venue: Shahid Tajuddin Ahmed Indoor Stadium; Level: International Challenge; Prize: $15,000; Format: 32MS/32WS/32MD/32WD/32XD	(Malaysia) Chen Tang Jie (Malaysia) Toh Ee Wei	(Thailand) Phatharathorn Nipornram (Thailand) Alisa Sapniti
5 December	Bangladesh International: Host: Dhaka, Bangladesh; Venue: Shahid Tajuddin Ahmed Indoor Stadium; Level: International Challenge; Prize: $15,000; Format: 32MS/32WS/32MD/32WD/32XD	Score: 21–15, 21–13	
5 December	Canadian International: Host: Markham, Ontario, Canada; Venue: Markham Pan Am Centre; Level: International Challenge; Prize: $25,000; Format: 64MS/32WS/32MD/32WD/32XD	(Japan) Takuma Obayashi	(Canada) Brian Yang
5 December	Canadian International: Host: Markham, Ontario, Canada; Venue: Markham Pan Am Centre; Level: International Challenge; Prize: $25,000; Format: 64MS/32WS/32MD/32WD/32XD	Score: 21–11, 21–17	
5 December	Canadian International: Host: Markham, Ontario, Canada; Venue: Markham Pan Am Centre; Level: International Challenge; Prize: $25,000; Format: 64MS/32WS/32MD/32WD/32XD	(Canada) Michelle Li	(Japan) Natsuki Nidaira
5 December	Canadian International: Host: Markham, Ontario, Canada; Venue: Markham Pan Am Centre; Level: International Challenge; Prize: $25,000; Format: 64MS/32WS/32MD/32WD/32XD	Score: 21–11, 21–17	
5 December	Canadian International: Host: Markham, Ontario, Canada; Venue: Markham Pan Am Centre; Level: International Challenge; Prize: $25,000; Format: 64MS/32WS/32MD/32WD/32XD	(Denmark) Rasmus Kjær (Denmark) Frederik Søgaard	(Japan) Mahiro Kaneko (Japan) Hashiru Shimono
5 December	Canadian International: Host: Markham, Ontario, Canada; Venue: Markham Pan Am Centre; Level: International Challenge; Prize: $25,000; Format: 64MS/32WS/32MD/32WD/32XD	Score: 21–17, 21–17	
5 December	Canadian International: Host: Markham, Ontario, Canada; Venue: Markham Pan Am Centre; Level: International Challenge; Prize: $25,000; Format: 64MS/32WS/32MD/32WD/32XD	(United States) Annie Xu (United States) Kerry Xu	(Spain) Clara Azurmendi (Spain) Beatriz Corrales
5 December	Canadian International: Host: Markham, Ontario, Canada; Venue: Markham Pan Am Centre; Level: International Challenge; Prize: $25,000; Format: 64MS/32WS/32MD/32WD/32XD	Score: 15–21, 21–15, 21–14	
5 December	Canadian International: Host: Markham, Ontario, Canada; Venue: Markham Pan Am Centre; Level: International Challenge; Prize: $25,000; Format: 64MS/32WS/32MD/32WD/32XD	(Denmark) Mathias Thyrri (Denmark) Amalie Magelund	(Germany) Jan Colin Völker (Germany) Stine Küspert
5 December	Canadian International: Host: Markham, Ontario, Canada; Venue: Markham Pan Am Centre; Level: International Challenge; Prize: $25,000; Format: 64MS/32WS/32MD/32WD/32XD	Score: 21–17, 21–16	
5 December	Malta International: Host: Cospicua, Malta; Venue: Cottonera Sports Complex; Level: Future Series; Format: 32MS/32WS/32MD/32WD/32XD	(Azerbaijan) Ade Resky Dwicahyo	(Bulgaria) Dimitar Yanakiev
5 December	Malta International: Host: Cospicua, Malta; Venue: Cottonera Sports Complex; Level: Future Series; Format: 32MS/32WS/32MD/32WD/32XD	Score: 21–19, 17–21, 21–14	
5 December	Malta International: Host: Cospicua, Malta; Venue: Cottonera Sports Complex; Level: Future Series; Format: 32MS/32WS/32MD/32WD/32XD	(Indonesia) Gabriela Meilani Moningka	(Germany) Antonia Schaller
5 December	Malta International: Host: Cospicua, Malta; Venue: Cottonera Sports Complex; Level: Future Series; Format: 32MS/32WS/32MD/32WD/32XD	Score: 21–11, 21–12	
5 December	Malta International: Host: Cospicua, Malta; Venue: Cottonera Sports Complex; Level: Future Series; Format: 32MS/32WS/32MD/32WD/32XD	(Germany) Jarne Schlevoigt (Germany) Nikolaj Stupplich	(Azerbaijan) Ade Resky Dwicahyo (Azerbaijan) Azmy Qowimuramadhoni
5 December	Malta International: Host: Cospicua, Malta; Venue: Cottonera Sports Complex; Level: Future Series; Format: 32MS/32WS/32MD/32WD/32XD	Score: 22–20, 21–15	
5 December	Malta International: Host: Cospicua, Malta; Venue: Cottonera Sports Complex; Level: Future Series; Format: 32MS/32WS/32MD/32WD/32XD	(Netherlands) Kirsten de Wit (Netherlands) Alyssa Tirtosentono	(Germany) Julia Meyer (Germany) Leona Michalski
5 December	Malta International: Host: Cospicua, Malta; Venue: Cottonera Sports Complex; Level: Future Series; Format: 32MS/32WS/32MD/32WD/32XD	Score: 21–16, 21–16	
5 December	Malta International: Host: Cospicua, Malta; Venue: Cottonera Sports Complex; Level: Future Series; Format: 32MS/32WS/32MD/32WD/32XD	(Germany) Malik Bourakkadi (Germany) Leona Michalski	(Netherlands) Brian Wassink (Netherlands) Alyssa Tirtosentono
5 December	Malta International: Host: Cospicua, Malta; Venue: Cottonera Sports Complex; Level: Future Series; Format: 32MS/32WS/32MD/32WD/32XD	Score: 21–14, 13–21, 21–16	
12 December	Malaysia International Challenge: Host: Ipoh, Malaysia; Venue: Arena Badminton Perak; Level: International Challenge; Prize: $25,000; Format: 64MS/32WS/32MD/32WD/32XD	(Malaysia) Justin Hoh	(Malaysia) Aidil Sholeh
12 December	Malaysia International Challenge: Host: Ipoh, Malaysia; Venue: Arena Badminton Perak; Level: International Challenge; Prize: $25,000; Format: 64MS/32WS/32MD/32WD/32XD	Score: 18–21, 21–16, 21–17	
12 December	Malaysia International Challenge: Host: Ipoh, Malaysia; Venue: Arena Badminton Perak; Level: International Challenge; Prize: $25,000; Format: 64MS/32WS/32MD/32WD/32XD	(Indonesia) Yulia Yosephine Susanto	(Malaysia) Letshanaa Karupathevan
12 December	Malaysia International Challenge: Host: Ipoh, Malaysia; Venue: Arena Badminton Perak; Level: International Challenge; Prize: $25,000; Format: 64MS/32WS/32MD/32WD/32XD	Score: 21–16, 21–19	
12 December	Malaysia International Challenge: Host: Ipoh, Malaysia; Venue: Arena Badminton Perak; Level: International Challenge; Prize: $25,000; Format: 64MS/32WS/32MD/32WD/32XD	(Malaysia) Muhammad Haikal (Malaysia) Nur Izzuddin	(Malaysia) Goh Boon Zhe (Malaysia) Goh Sze Fei
12 December	Malaysia International Challenge: Host: Ipoh, Malaysia; Venue: Arena Badminton Perak; Level: International Challenge; Prize: $25,000; Format: 64MS/32WS/32MD/32WD/32XD	Score: 21–17, 21–16	
12 December	Malaysia International Challenge: Host: Ipoh, Malaysia; Venue: Arena Badminton Perak; Level: International Challenge; Prize: $25,000; Format: 64MS/32WS/32MD/32WD/32XD	(Singapore) Jin Yujia (Singapore) Crystal Wong	(Thailand) Ornnicha Jongsathapornparn (Thailand) Atitaya Povanon
12 December	Malaysia International Challenge: Host: Ipoh, Malaysia; Venue: Arena Badminton Perak; Level: International Challenge; Prize: $25,000; Format: 64MS/32WS/32MD/32WD/32XD	Score: 21–12, 21–15	
12 December	Malaysia International Challenge: Host: Ipoh, Malaysia; Venue: Arena Badminton Perak; Level: International Challenge; Prize: $25,000; Format: 64MS/32WS/32MD/32WD/32XD	(Malaysia) Hoo Pang Ron (Malaysia) Teoh Mei Xing	(Malaysia) Chen Tang Jie (Malaysia) Toh Ee Wei
12 December	Malaysia International Challenge: Host: Ipoh, Malaysia; Venue: Arena Badminton Perak; Level: International Challenge; Prize: $25,000; Format: 64MS/32WS/32MD/32WD/32XD	Score: 18–21, 21–15, 21–19	
19 December	Turkey Open (cancelled) (Note: This tournament, originally to be played on 19 to 22 December, was later cancelled due to the COVID-19 pandemic in Turkey.): Host: Ankara, Turkey; Venue: Turkish Olympic Center; Level: International Series; Prize: $5,000; Format: 32MS/32WS/32MD/8WD/32XD		
19 December	Turkey Open (cancelled): Host: Ankara, Turkey; Venue: Turkish Olympic Center; Level: International Series; Prize: $5,000; Format: 32MS/32WS/32MD/8WD/32XD	Score:	
19 December	Turkey Open (cancelled): Host: Ankara, Turkey; Venue: Turkish Olympic Center; Level: International Series; Prize: $5,000; Format: 32MS/32WS/32MD/8WD/32XD	Score:	
19 December	Turkey Open (cancelled): Host: Ankara, Turkey; Venue: Turkish Olympic Center; Level: International Series; Prize: $5,000; Format: 32MS/32WS/32MD/8WD/32XD	Score:	
19 December	Turkey Open (cancelled): Host: Ankara, Turkey; Venue: Turkish Olympic Center; Level: International Series; Prize: $5,000; Format: 32MS/32WS/32MD/8WD/32XD	Score:	
19 December	Turkey Open (cancelled): Host: Ankara, Turkey; Venue: Turkish Olympic Center; Level: International Series; Prize: $5,000; Format: 32MS/32WS/32MD/8WD/32XD	Score:	

== Retirements ==
Following is a list of notable players (winners of the main tour title, and/or part of the BWF Rankings top 100 for at least one week) who announced their retirement from professional badminton, during the 2022 season:

- Li Yinhui (born 11 March 1997 in Wuhan, Hubei, China) reached a career-high of no. 5 in the women's doubles on 17 March 2020 and no. 3 in the mixed doubles on 24 August 2017. She won eight individual titles and also two bronze medals at the BWF World Championships. Li was part of the Chinese team that won gold at the 2019 Asia Mixed Team Championships and Sudirman Cup. Li announced her retirement through her social media account. Chinese media reported that she and Du Yue were removed from the world rankings on 25 January 2022. The 2020 Summer Olympics was her last tournament.
- (Republic of Ireland) Sam Magee (born 9 January 1990 in Raphoe, County Donegal, Ireland) reached a career-high of no. 21 in the mixed doubles on 6 August 2015. He won the boys' doubles title at the 2009 European Junior Championships, and bronze medals at the European Games in the mixed doubles event with his sister Chloe Magee in 2015 and 2019, and also in the men's doubles with his brother Joshua Magee in 2015. Together with Chloe, he also won a bronze medal at the 2017 European Championships. He announced his retirement from international tournaments on 16 February 2022. The 2021 European Championships was his last tournament.
- Lee Meng Yean (born 30 March 1994 in Malacca, Malaysia) reached a career-high of no. 10 in the women's doubles on 2 February 2021. She was the gold medalist at the World Junior Championships in mixed team and bronze at the women's and mixed doubles; and bronze at the 2019 Southeast Asian Games and 2013 Summer Universiade in women's doubles. She helped the Malaysian team win bronze at the 2020 Asian Women's Team Championships. Her retirement was in conjunction with her appointment as a doubles coach for the Badminton Association of Malaysia on 25 February 2022. The 2021 Indonesia Open was her last tournament.
- Ajay Jayaram (born 28 September 1987 in Chennai, India) reached a career-high of no. 13 in the men's singles on 25 May 2017. He was a member of the Indian team that won a bronze medal at the 2016 Asia Team Championships. Jayaram also won five individual titles including 2 Grand Prix titles at the Dutch Open in 2014 and 2015. He announced his retirement from international tournaments on 26 March 2022. The 2022 India Open was his last tournament.
- (Singapore) Danny Bawa Chrisnanta (born 30 December 1988 in Salatiga, Central Java, Indonesia) reached a career-high of no. 16 in the men's doubles on 16 April 2015 and no. 9 in the mixed doubles on 28 February 2013. He won the silver medal at the 2014 Commonwealth Games and the bronze medal at the 2015 Southeast Asian Games in the men's doubles with Chayut Triyachart. He won 15 titles in BWF sanctioned tournaments in both men's and mixed doubles. He announced his retirement from professional badminton on 27 May 2022 through his Instagram page. The 2021 Southeast Asian Games was his last tournament.
- Ni Ketut Mahadewi Istarani (born 12 September 1994 in Tabanan, Bali, Indonesia) reached a career high of no. 13 in the women's doubles on 25 January 2018. She was part of Indonesia team that won the silver medal at the 2019 Southeast Asian Games, and bronze medals at the 2015 and 2017 edition, and won 4 titles in the BWF sanctioned tournaments. She announced her retirement from the international tournaments on 11 June 2022. The 2021 Bahrain International Challenge was her last tournament.
- Gurusai Dutt (born 1 March 1990 in Bheemavaram, West Godavari district, Andhra Pradesh, India) reached a career high of no. 19 in the men's singles on 28 November 2013. He announced his retirement from professional badminton through social media on 6 June 2022.
- Greysia Polii (born 11 August 1987 in Jakarta, Indonesia) reached a career high of no. 2 in the women's doubles on 28 January 2016. She was the 2020 Summer Olympics Gold medallist, she also won gold medals in the women's doubles at the 2014 Asian Games, at the 2019 Southeast Asian Games. Polii officially announced her retirement in a press conference on 3 June 2022 and had her testimonial at the Istora Gelora Bung Karno on 12 June 2022. The 2022 All England Open was her last tournament.
- Liu Cheng (born 4 January 1992 in Sanming, Fujian, China) reached a career-high of no. 2 in both men's and mixed doubles events. He won the men's doubles title at the 2017 World Championships with Zhang Nan, and was part of the Chinese team that won the Sudirman Cup in 2015 and 2021, the Thomas Cup in 2018, and also the Asian Games in 2018. Liu announced his retirement through his social media account on 30 June 2022. The 2022 Thomas Cup was his last tournament.
- Wong Wing Ki (born 18 March 1990 as Wong Shu Ki in British Hong Kong) reached a career-high of no. 10 in men's singles on 25 May 2017. He won the 2016 Vietnam Open Grand Prix title, and was part of the Hong Kong team that won the silver medal at the 2013 East Asian Games. Wong announced his retirement through his Instagram account on 10 August 2022, and retired after his final match on 24 August 2022. The 2022 BWF World Championships was his last tournament.
- Thomas Rouxel (born 26 May 1991 in Rennes, France) reached a career-high of no. 38 in men's singles on 2 November 2021. He was part of the French team that won silver and bronze in the European Men's and Women's Team Badminton Championships in 2016 and 2018 respectively. He was a runner-up at the 2019 Orléans Masters Super 100 event. Rouxel announced his retirement through social media on 2 September 2022. The 2022 Indonesia Open was his last tournament.
- Toby Penty (born 12 August 1992 in Walton-on-Thames, England) reached a career-high of no. 43 in men's singles on 15 November 2018. He won the 2017 Scottish Open Grand Prix title, and was part of the English team that won the silver medal at the 2015 European Mixed Team Badminton Championships, 2018 European Men's team and 2014 European Men's Team badminton championships. Penty announced his retirement on 6 September 2022. The 2022 BWF World Championships was his last tournament.
- Sayaka Takahashi (born 29 July 1992 in Kashihara, Nara, Japan) reached a career-high of no. 10 in women's singles on 12 February 2019. She was part of the Japanese team that won gold in the 2018 Uber Cup and was also part of the squad that won silver in the 2021 Sudirman Cup. She won her biggest career title in the 2018 Singapore Open and finished as runner-up in the 2021 French Open. Takahashi announced her retirement on 20 September 2022. The 2022 Japan Open was her last tournament.
- Chen Long (born 18 January 1989 in Jingzhou, Hubei, China) reached a career-high of no. 1 in men's singles on 25 December 2014. He won the gold medal at the 2016 Olympic Games, silver medal at the 2020 Olympic Games, and the bronze medal at the 2012 Olympic Games. He also won two consecutive men's singles titles at the BWF World Championships, at the 2014 and 2015 editions. Chen was also part of the Chinese team that won the Sudirman Cup in 2009, 2011, 2013, 2015 and 2019, the Thomas Cup in 2010, 2012 and 2018, and also the Asian Games in 2010 and 2018. Even though he has not publicly announced his retirement, his BWF world ranking was removed on 4 October 2022, leading to most speculating about his retirement. The 2020 Olympic Games was his last international tournament.
