= Badminton at the 2019 European Games =

- Venue: Falcon Club
- Dates: 24–30 June
- Competitors: 145 from 38 nations

Badminton at the 2019 European Games was held at Falcon Club, Minsk, Belarus from 24 to 30 June. The badminton programme in 2019 included men's and women's singles competitions; men's, women's and mixed doubles competitions.

== Qualification ==
| NOC | Men | | Women | | Mixed | Total | |
| NOC | Singles | Doubles | Singles | Doubles | Doubles | Quotas | Athletes |
|---|---|---|---|---|---|---|---|
| Armenia | | | 1 | | | 1 | 1 |
| Austria | 1 | 1 | | | | 2 | 3 |
| Azerbaijan | 1 | | | | | 1 | 1 |
| Belarus | | | 2 | 1 | 1 | 4 | 4 |
| Belgium | 1 | | 1 | 1 | | 3 | 4 |
| Bulgaria | 1 | 1 | 1 | | 1 | 4 | 5 |
| Croatia | 1 | | 1 | | | 2 | 2 |
| Cyprus | | | 1 | | | 1 | 1 |
| Czech Republic | 1 | 1 | 1 | 1 | 1 | 5 | 7 |
| Denmark | ~~2~~ 1 | 1 | 2 | 1 | 1 | 5 | 8 |
| Estonia | 1 | 1 | 1 | 1 | | 4 | 6 |
| Finland | 1 | 1 | 1 | | | 3 | 4 |
| France | 1 | 1 | 1 | 1 | 1 | 5 | 7 |
| Germany | 1 | 1 | 1 | 1 | 1 | 5 | 7 |
| Great Britain | 1 | 1 | 2 | 1 | 2 | 7 | 8 |
| Hungary | 1 | | 1 | 1 | | 3 | 4 |
| Iceland | 1 | | | | | 1 | 1 |
| Ireland | 1 | 1 | 1 | | 1 | 4 | 6 |
| Israel | 1 | | 1 | | 1 | 3 | 3 |
| Italy | 1 | 1 | | 1 | | 3 | 5 |
| Latvia | | | 1 | | | 1 | 1 |
| Lithuania | | | 1 | 1 | | 2 | 2 |
| Luxembourg | 1 | | | | | 1 | 1 |
| Moldova | 1 | | 1 | | | 2 | 2 |
| Netherlands | 1 | 1 | 1 | 1 | 1 | 5 | 6 |
| Norway | | 1 | 1 | | | 2 | 3 |
| Poland | 1 | 1 | | | 1 | 3 | 5 |
| Portugal | 1 | | 1 | | | 2 | 2 |
| Romania | 1 | | | | | 1 | 1 |
| Russia | 1 | 1 | 1 | 1 | 1 | 5 | 8 |
| Serbia | 1 | | | | | 1 | 1 |
| Slovakia | | | 1 | | | 1 | 1 |
| Slovenia | 1 | | 1 | | | 2 | 2 |
| Spain | 1 | | 1 | | 1 | 3 | 4 |
| Sweden | 1 | | | 1 | | 2 | 3 |
| Switzerland | 1 | | 1 | | 1 | 3 | 4 |
| Turkey | 1 | | 1 | 1 | | 3 | 4 |
| Ukraine | 1 | 1 | 1 | 1 | 1 | 5 | 7 |
| 38 NOCs | 31 | 16 | 32 | 16 | 16 | 111 | 144 |

== Competition schedule ==
| GS | Group stage | R16 | Round of 16 | ¼ | Quarterfinals | ½ | Semifinals | F | Final |

| Events | Mon 24 | Tue 25 | Wed 26 | Thu 27 | Fri 28 | Sat 29 | Sun 30 |
|---|---|---|---|---|---|---|---|
| Men's singles | GS | GS | GS | R16 | ¼ | ½ | F |
| Men's doubles | GS | GS | GS | ¼ | ½ | F | |
| Women's singles | GS | GS | GS | R16 | ¼ | ½ | F |
| Women's doubles | GS | GS | GS | ¼ | ½ | F | |
| Mixed doubles | GS | GS | | GS | ¼ | ½ | F |

== Medalists ==
=== Medal table ===
* Host nation (Belarus)

| Rank | NOC | Gold | Silver | Bronze | Total |
|---|---|---|---|---|---|
| 1 | Great Britain (GBR) | 2 | 3 | 0 | 5 |
| 2 | Denmark (DEN) | 2 | 1 | 1 | 4 |
| 3 | Netherlands (NED) | 1 | 0 | 1 | 2 |
| 4 | France (FRA) | 0 | 1 | 2 | 3 |
| 5 | Russia (RUS) | 0 | 0 | 3 | 3 |
| 6 | Estonia (EST) | 0 | 0 | 1 | 1 |
| 6 | Ireland (IRL) | 0 | 0 | 1 | 1 |
| 6 | Israel (ISR) | 0 | 0 | 1 | 1 |
| Totals (8 entries) | | 5 | 5 | 10 | 20 |

=== Medalists ===
| Event | Gold | Silver | Bronze |
|---|---|---|---|
| Men's singles | Anders Antonsen; Denmark | Brice Leverdez; France | Raul Must; Estonia |
| Men's singles | Anders Antonsen; Denmark | Brice Leverdez; France | Misha Zilberman; Israel |
| Women's singles | Mia Blichfeldt; Denmark | Kirsty Gilmour; Great Britain | Line Kjærsfeldt; Denmark |
| Women's singles | Mia Blichfeldt; Denmark | Kirsty Gilmour; Great Britain | Evgeniya Kosetskaya; Russia |
| Men's doubles | Great Britain; Marcus Ellis; Chris Langridge | Denmark; Kim Astrup; Anders Skaarup Rasmussen | Russia; Vladimir Ivanov; Ivan Sozonov |
| Men's doubles | Great Britain; Marcus Ellis; Chris Langridge | Denmark; Kim Astrup; Anders Skaarup Rasmussen | Netherlands; Jelle Maas; Robin Tabeling |
| Women's doubles | Netherlands; Selena Piek; Cheryl Seinen | Great Britain; Chloe Birch; Lauren Smith | France; Émilie Lefel; Anne Tran |
| Women's doubles | Netherlands; Selena Piek; Cheryl Seinen | Great Britain; Chloe Birch; Lauren Smith | Russia; Ekaterina Bolotova; Alina Davletova |
| Mixed doubles | Great Britain; Marcus Ellis; Lauren Smith | Great Britain; Chris Adcock; Gabby Adcock | Ireland; Sam Magee; Chloe Magee |
| Mixed doubles | Great Britain; Marcus Ellis; Lauren Smith | Great Britain; Chris Adcock; Gabby Adcock | France; Thom Gicquel; Delphine Delrue |
