= Denmark at the 2019 European Games =

- IOC code: DEN
- NOC: National Olympic Committee and Sports Confederation of Denmark
- Website: www.dif.dk

in Minsk, Belarus 21 – 30 June 2019
- Competitors: 61 in 11 sports
- Flag bearer: Line Kjærsfeldt (badminton)
- Medals Ranked 21st: Gold 3 Silver 2 Bronze 3 Total 8

European Games appearances (overview)
- 2015; 2019; 2023; 2027

Denmark competed at the 2019 European Games, in Minsk, Belarus from 21 to 30 June 2019. Denmark had previously competed at the 2015 European Games in Baku, Azerbaijan, where it won 12 medals, including four golds.

== Medalists ==
Medal	Name	Sport	Event	Date
Gold	Emma Jørgensen	Canoe sprint	Women's K-1 200 m	27 June
Gold	Anders Antonsen	Badminton	Men's singles	30 June
Gold	Mia Blichfeldt	Badminton	Women's singles	30 June
Silver	Jonathan Groth	Table tennis	Men's singles	26 June
Silver	Kim Astrup; Anders Skaarup Rasmussen	Badminton	Men's doubles	29 June
Bronze	Anne Laursen; Maja Jager; Randi Degn	Archery	Women's team recurve	22 June
Bronze	Emma Jørgensen	Canoe sprint	Women's K-1 500 m	27 June
Bronze	Line Kjærsfeldt	Badminton	Women's singles	29 June

== Archery ==
Recurve

Athlete	Event	Ranking round		Round of 64	Round of 32	Round of 16	Quarterfinals	Semifinals	Final / BM	
Athlete	Event	Score	Seed	Opposition Score	Opposition Score	Opposition Score	Opposition Score	Opposition Score	Opposition Score	Rank
Maja Jager	Women's individual	630	20	Šibalić (MNE); W 6–4	Marín (ESP); W 6–4	Stepanova (RUS); L 5–6	Did not advance			
Randi Degn	Women's individual	609	34	Baránková (SVK); W 6–2	Perova (RUS); W 6–5	Marchenko (UKR); W 6–4	Balsukova (RUS); L 1–7	Did not advance		
Anne Laursen	Women's individual	605	37	Coşkun (TUR); L 2–6	Did not advance					
Maja Jager; Randi Degn; Anne Laursen	Women's team	1844	8	—			Russia; W 5–4	Great Britain; L 0–6	BM; Germany; W 5–4	3rd place, bronze medalist(s)

Compound

Athlete	Event	Ranking round		Round of 16	Quarterfinals	Semifinals	Final / BM	
Athlete	Event	Score	Seed	Opposition Score	Opposition Score	Opposition Score	Opposition Score	Rank
Tanja Jensen	Women's individual	696	6	Prieels (BEL); W 145–142	Dodemont (FRA); L 142–143	Did not advance		

== Athletics ==
Individual

Athlete	Event	Result	Rank
Frederik Schou-Nielsen	Men's 100 m	DQ	—
Andreas Martinsen	Men's 110 m hurdles	13.95	8
Simon Hansen	Men's high jump	1.94	20
Astrid Glenner-Frandsen	Women's 100 m	11.73	8
Mette Graversgaard	Women's 100 m hurdles	13.89	=14
Janne Nielsen	Women's long jump	5.68	23
Marie Vestergaard	Women's javelin throw	52.31	13
Zarah Buchwald; Gustav Lundholm Nielsen; Emma Bomme; Benjamin Lobo Vedel	Mixed 4 × 400 metres relay	3:27.68	20
Kristian Uldbjerg Hansen; Helene Gottlieb; Benjamin Lobo Vedel; Astrid Glenner-Frandsen	Mixed distance pursuit relay	4:29.10	4

Team

Event	Qualification match				Quarterfinal				Semifinal				Final			
Event	Athlete	Result	Rank	Points	Athlete	Result	Rank	Points	Athlete	Result	Rank	Points	Athlete	Result	Rank	Points
Men's 100 m	Frederik Schou-Nielsen	DQ	—	0	Frederik Schou-Nielsen	10.65	5	4	Did not advance							
Women's long jump	Janne Nielsen	—	6	2	Janne Nielsen	—	3	8	Did not advance							
Women's 100 m	Astrid Glenner-Frandsen	11.73	3	8	Astrid Glenner-Frandsen	11.76	4	6	Did not advance							
Women's javelin throw	Marie Vestergaard	—	4	6	Marie Vestergaard	—	4	6	Did not advance							
Mixed 4 × 400 m relay	Zarah Buchwald; Gustav Lundholm Nielsen; Emma Bomme; Benjamin Lobo Vedel	3:27.68	5	4	Sara Slott Petersen; Nicolai Hartling; Emma Bomme; Gustav Lundholm Nielsen	3:24.72	2	10	Did not advance							
Men's 110 m hurdles	Andreas Martinsen	13.95	2	10	Andreas Martinsen	13.89	1	12	Did not advance							
Men's high jump	Simon Hansen	—	1	12	Simon Hansen	—	6	2	Did not advance							
Women's 100 m hurdles	Mette Graversgaard	13.89	5	4	Mette Graversgaard	14.03	4	6	Did not advance							
Subtotal	—		5	46	—		3	54	Did not advance							
Mixed medley relay	Kristian Uldbjerg Hansen; Helene Gottlieb; Benjamin Lobo Vedel; Astrid Glenner-Frandsen	4:39.10	3 QQF	—	Kristian Uldbjerg Hansen; Helene Gottlieb; Benjamin Lobo Vedel; Emma Bomme	4:37.57	3	—	Did not advance							

== Badminton ==
Athletes	Event	Group stage				Round of 16	Quarterfinals	Semifinals	Final	Rank
Athletes	Event	Opposition Score	Opposition Score	Opposition Score	Rank	Opposition Score	Opposition Score	Opposition Score	Opposition Score	Rank
Anders Antonsen	Men's singles	Đurkinjak (CRO); W 2–0	Moreels (BEL); W 2–0	Must (EST); W 2–0	1	Kirchmayr (SUI); W 2–0	Penty (GBR); W 2–0	Zilberman (ISR); W 2–0	Leverdez (FRA); W 2–1	1st place, gold medalist(s)
Viktor Axelsen	Men's singles	Withdrew								–
Line Kjærsfeldt	Women's singles	Ginga (MDA); W 2–0	Polikarpova (ISR); W 2–0	Poghosyan (ARM); W 2–0	1	Mikkelä (FIN); W 2–0	Yiğit (TUR); W 2–1	Gilmour (GBR); L 1–2	Did not advance	3rd place, bronze medalist(s)
Mia Blichfeldt	Women's singles	Tomalová (CZE); W 2–0	Repiská (SVK); W 2–0	Pope (LAT); W 2–0	1	Polikarpova (ISR); W 2–1	Birch (GBR); W 2–0	Kosetskaya (RUS); W 2–0	Gilmour (GBR); W 2–0	1st place, gold medalist(s)
Kim Astrup; Anders Skaarup Rasmussen	Men's doubles	Bochat / Cwalina (POL); W 2–1	Greco / Strobl (ITA); W 2–0	Maas / Tabeling (NED); W 2–0	1	—	Gicquel / Labar (FRA); W 2–1	Ivanov / Sozonov (RUS); W 2–0	Ellis / Langridge (GBR); L 0–2	2nd place, silver medalist(s)
Maiken Fruergaard; Sara Thygesen	Women's doubles	Birch / Smith (GBR); L 0–2	Bukoviczki / Gonda (HUN); W 2–0	Fomkinaitė / Voitechovskaja (LTU); W 2–0	2	—	Piek / Seinen (NED); L 0–2	Did not advance		
Niclas Nøhr; Sara Thygesen	Mixed doubles	Ellis / Smith (GBR); L 0–2	Zapico / Uslé (ESP); W 2–0	Atrashchenkov / Zharka (UKR); W 2–0	2	—	Adcock / Adcock (GBR); L 1–2	Did not advance		

== Boxing ==
Athlete	Event	Round of 32	Round of 16	Quarterfinals	Semifinals	Final
Athlete	Event	Opposition Score	Opposition Score	Opposition Score	Opposition Score	Opposition Score
Fredrik Jensen	Men's light welterweight	Khartsyz (UKR); L RSC	Did not advance			
Ditte Frostholm	Women's lightweight	—	Sadiku (KOS); W 5–0	Belyakova (RUS); L 0–5	Did not advance	

== Canoe sprint ==
Men

Athlete	Event	Heat		Semi-final		Final	
Athlete	Event	Time	Rank	Time	Rank	Time	Rank
René Holten Poulsen	K-1 1000 m	3:32.508	3	3:26.832	3	3:34.033	4
René Holten Poulsen	K-1 5000 m	—				23:10.981	14
Nils Boe; René Holten Poulsen	K-2 1000 m	3:22.551	7	3:15.772	7	Did not advance	

Women

Athlete	Event	Heat		Semi-final		Final	
Athlete	Event	Time	Rank	Time	Rank	Time	Rank
Emma Jørgensen	K-1 200 m	40.514	1	Bye		41.625	1st place, gold medalist(s)
Emma Jørgensen	K-1 500 m	1:50.590	3	1:50.419	2	2:04.989	3rd place, bronze medalist(s)
Emma Jørgensen	K-1 5000 m	—				25:50.634	6
Bolette Iversen; Line Langelund	K-2 200 m	40.428	5	39.321	6	Did not advance	
Julie Funch; Emma Jørgensen; Pernille Knudsen; Line Langelund	K-2 500 m	1:33.446	5	1:33.700	1	1:45.346	7

== Gymnastics ==
=== Trampoline ===
Men

Athlete	Event	Qualification		Final	
Athlete	Event	Score	Rank	Score	Rank
Benjamin Kjær	Individual	107.720	9	56.250	6

== Judo ==
Men

Athlete	Event	Round of 32	Round of 16	Quarterfinals	Semi-finals	Repechage	Final/BM	Rank
Athlete	Event	Opposition Result	Opposition Result	Opposition Result	Opposition Result	Opposition Result	Opposition Result	Rank
Mathias Madsen	100 kg	Arman Adamian (RUS); L	Did not advance					

Women

Athlete	Event	Round of 32	Round of 16	Quarterfinals	Semi-finals	Repechage	Final/BM	Rank
Athlete	Event	Opposition Result	Opposition Result	Opposition Result	Opposition Result	Opposition Result	Opposition Result	Rank
Lærke Olsen	63 kg	Edwige Gwend (ITA); L	Did not advance					
Emilie Sook	70 kg	Daria Pogorzelec (POL); L	Did not advance					

== Karate ==
Katrine Pedersen competed in the women's kumite 68 kg event.

Athlete	Event	Group phase				Semifinal	Final / BM	
Athlete	Event	Opposition Score	Opposition Score	Opposition Score	Rank	Opposition Score	Opposition Score	Rank
Katrine Pedersen	–68 kg	Melnyk (UKR); D 0–0	Quirici (SUI); L 0–1	Aliakseyeva (BLR); L 1–2	4	Did not advance		

== Shooting ==
Men

Athlete	Event	Qualification		Final	
Athlete	Event	Points	Rank	Points	Rank
Mikkel Damholt	10 m air rifle	617.7	37	Did not advance	
Jesper Hansen	Skeet	120	10	Did not advance	
Esben Jakobsen	50 m rifle 3 positions	1154	29	Did not advance	
Frederik Larsen	10 m air pistol	567	29	Did not advance	
Steffen Olsen	10 m air rifle	620.1	33	Did not advance	
Steffen Olsen	50 m rifle 3 positions	1164	21	Did not advance	
Emil Petersen	Skeet	122	2 Q	35	4

Women

Athlete	Event	Qualification		Final	
Athlete	Event	Points	Rank	Points	Rank
Rikke Ibsen	50 m rifle 3 position	1160	12	Did not advance	
Stine Nielsen	10 m air rifle	624.1	20	Did not advance	
Stine Nielsen	50 m rifle 3 position	1142	38	Did not advance	

Mixed

Athlete	Event	Qualification		Final	
Athlete	Event	Points	Rank	Points	Rank
Mikkel Damholt; Anna Skade Nielsen	10 m air rifle	624.2	8 Q	409.4	8
Esben Jakobsen; Stine Nielsen	50 m rifle prone	410.0	18	Did not advance	
Steffen Olsen; Rikke Mæng	10 m air rifle	615.9	32	Did not advance	
Steffen Olsen; Stine Nielsen	50 m rifle prone	408.7	20	Did not advance	

== Table tennis ==
Men

Athlete	Event	Round 1	Round 2	Round 3	Round 4	Quarterfinals	Semifinals	Final / BM	
Athlete	Event	Opposition Score	Opposition Score	Opposition Score	Opposition Score	Opposition Score	Opposition Score	Opposition Score	Rank
Jonathan Groth	Men's singles	Bye		Walker (GBR); W 4–3	Ovtcharov (GER); W 4–0	Wang (SVK); W 4–3	Kou (UKR); W 4–0	Boll (GER); L 2–4	2nd place, silver medalist(s)
Anders Lind	Men's singles	Bye	Karakašević (SRB); W 4–2	Lebesson (FRA); L 1–4	Did not advance				

Team

Athlete	Event	First round	Quarterfinals	Semifinals	Final / BM	
Athlete	Event	Opposition Score	Opposition Score	Opposition Score	Opposition Score	Rank
Jonathan Groth; Anders Lind; Tobias Rasmussen	Men's team	Slovenia; W 3–2	Austria; W 3–1	Sweden; L 1–3	BM; Portugal; L 1–3	4
