= Table tennis at the 2019 European Games =

- Venue: Tennis Olympic Centre
- Dates: 22–29 June
- Competitors: 125 from 33 nations

Table tennis at the 2019 European Games in Minsk took place from 22 to 29 June 2019 at Tennis Olympic Centre. The three medalists in the men's and women's singles events qualified for the 2020 Summer Olympics while the gold medalists in the men's and women's team events and mixed doubles event received an Olympic quota.

== Qualification ==
Maximum quota per NOC: 2 athletes in each singles event, 1 team in each team event and 1 pair in the mixed doubles.

=== Singles ===
Means of qualification	Date of competition	Berths	Athletes per NOC	Qualified men's	Qualified women's
Host country		1	3	Belarus	Belarus
Team event qualifiers	1 December 2018	11	3	see below	see below
ITTF World Singles Rankings	1 March 2019	9	1	Kou Lei (UKR); Panagiotis Gionis (GRE); Kirill Skachkov (RUS); Wang Yang (SVK); Benedek Olah (FIN); Mihai Bobocica (ITA); Pavel Širůček (CZE); Lubomír Jančařík (CZE); Nándor Ecseki (HUN)	Fu Yu (POR); Hana Matelová (CZE); Yang Xiaoxin (MON); Alex Galič (SLO); Dana Čechová (CZE); Stéphanie Loeuillette (FRA); Rachel Moret (SUI); Deborah Vivarelli (ITA); Mateja Jeger (CRO)
Universality places	–	3	1	Medardas Stankevičius (LTU); Andrei Puţuntică (MDA); Fatih Karabaxhak (KOS)	Emina Hadžiahmetović (BIH); Maria Yovkova (BUL); Özge Yılmaz (TUR)
Total				48	48

=== Team ===
Means of qualification	Date of competition	Berths	Qualified men's	Qualified women's
Host country		1	Belarus	Belarus
ETTU Special Team Ranking	1 December 2018	11	Germany; Sweden; France; Portugal; Austria; Great Britain; Slovenia; Croatia; Romania; Denmark; Belgium	Romania; Germany; Austria; Netherlands; Poland; Hungary; Russia; Ukraine; Spain; Sweden; Luxembourg
Total			12	12

=== Mixed doubles ===
Means of qualification	Date of competition	Berths	Qualified
Host country		1	Belarus
2018 European; Championships	18–23 September 2018	~~8~~ 6	Austria; Germany; Romania; Slovakia; Spain; Sweden
ITTF World Mixed; Doubles Rankings	1 March 2019	~~7~~ 9	Belgium; France; Hungary; Italy; Luxembourg; Netherlands; Poland; Russia; Serbia
Total			16

=== Summary ===
NOC	Men		Women		Mixed	Total athletes
NOC	Singles	Team	Singles	Team	Doubles	Total athletes
Austria	2	X	2	X	X	6
Belarus	2	X	2	X	X	6
Belgium	2	X	2		X	5
Bosnia and Herzegovina			1			1
Bulgaria			1			1
Croatia	2	X	1			4
Czech Republic	2		2			4
Denmark	2	X				3
Finland	1		1			2
France	2	X	2		X	6
Germany	2	X	2	X	X	7
Great Britain	2	X	2			5
Greece	2		1			3
Hungary	2		2	X	X	5
Italy	2		2		X	4
Kosovo	1					1
Lithuania	1					1
Luxembourg	1		2	X	X	4
Moldova	1					1
Monaco			1			1
Netherlands	2		2	X	X	5
Poland	2		2	X	X	5
Portugal	2	X	2			5
Romania	2	X	2	X	X	6
Russia	2		2	X	X	5
Serbia	1		2		X	3
Slovakia	2		2		X	4
Slovenia	2	X	1			4
Spain	2		2	X	X	5
Sweden	2	X	2	X	X	6
Switzerland			1			1
Turkey			1			1
Ukraine	2		2	X		5
33 NOCs	50	12	49	12	16	125

== Medal summary ==
=== Medal table ===
Rank	Nation	Gold	Silver	Bronze	Total
1	Germany	4	1	0	5
2	Portugal	1	0	1	2
3	Romania	0	2	0	2
4	Denmark	0	1	0	1
4	Sweden	0	1	0	1
6	Croatia	0	0	1	1
6	France	0	0	1	1
6	Luxembourg	0	0	1	1
6	Poland	0	0	1	1
Totals (9 entries)		5	5	5	15

=== Medalists ===
Event	Gold	Silver	Bronze
Men's singles	Timo Boll; Germany	Jonathan Groth; Denmark	Tomislav Pucar; Croatia
Men's team	Germany (GER); Timo Boll; Patrick Franziska; Dimitrij Ovtcharov	Sweden (SWE); Mattias Falck; Kristian Karlsson; Jon Persson	Portugal (POR); Tiago Apolónia; Marcos Freitas; João Monteiro
Women's singles	Fu Yu; Portugal	Han Ying; Germany	Ni Xialian; Luxembourg
Women's team	Germany (GER); Han Ying; Nina Mittelham; Shan Xiaona; Petrissa Solja	Romania (ROU); Daniela Dodean; Elizabeta Samara; Bernadette Szőcs	Poland (POL); Natalia Bajor; Li Qian; Natalia Partyka
Mixed doubles	Germany; Patrick Franziska; Petrissa Solja	Romania; Ovidiu Ionescu; Bernadette Szőcs	France; Tristan Flore; Laura Gasnier
