= Slovakia at the 2019 European Games =

- IOC code: SVK
- NOC: Slovak Olympic and Sports Committee
- Website: www.olympic.sk

in Minsk, Belarus 21 – 30 June 2019
- Competitors: 74 in 13 sports
- Flag bearers: Juraj Tužinský (opening); Andrej Csemez (closing)
- Medals Ranked 37th: Gold 0 Silver 1 Bronze 3 Total 4

European Games appearances (overview)
- 2015; 2019; 2023; 2027

Slovakia competed at the 2019 European Games, in Minsk, Belarus from 21 to 30 June 2019.

The Slovak Olympic and Sports Committee sent a total of 74 athletes to the Games, 45 men and 29 women, to compete in 13 sports.

== Medalists ==
Medal	Name	Sport	Event	Date
Silver	Ján Volko	Athletics	Men's 100 m	23 June
Bronze	Mariana Petrušová	Canoe sprint	Women's K1-5000 m	27 June
Bronze	Csaba Zalka; Samuel Baláž; Erik Vlček; Adam Botek	Canoe sprint	Men's K4-500 m	27 June
Bronze	Andrej Csemez	Boxing	Men's 75 kg	28 June

Medals by sport
Sport	1st place, gold medalist(s)	2nd place, silver medalist(s)	3rd place, bronze medalist(s)	Total
Athletics	0	1	0	1
Canoe sprint	0	0	2	2
Boxing	0	0	1	1
Total	0	1	3	4

== Archery ==
Men

Athlete	Event	Ranking round		Round of 64	Round of 32	Round of 16	Quarterfinals	Semifinals	Final / BM	
Athlete	Event	Score	Seed	Opposition Score	Opposition Score	Opposition Score	Opposition Score	Opposition Score	Opposition Score	Rank
Vladimír Hurban ml.	Individual recurve	604	47	Daniel Castro (ESP); L 4-6	Did not advance					

Women

Athlete	Event	Ranking round		Round of 64	Round of 32	Round of 16	Quarterfinals	Semifinals	Final / BM	
Athlete	Event	Score	Seed	Opposition Score	Opposition Score	Opposition Score	Opposition Score	Opposition Score	Opposition Score	Rank
Denisa Baránková	Individual recurve	615	31	Degn (DEN); L 2-6	Did not advance					

Mixed

Athlete	Event	Ranking round		Round of 24	Round of 16	Quarterfinals	Semifinals	Final / BM	
Athlete	Event	Score	Seed	Opposition Score	Opposition Score	Opposition Score	Opposition Score	Opposition Score	Rank
Vladimír Hurban ml. Denisa Baránková	Mixed team recurve	1219	Q 23	Ukraine (UKR); L 0-6	Did not advance				

== Athletics ==
Men
Track & road events

Athlete	Event	Result	Rank
Ján Volko	100 m	10.38	2nd place, silver medalist(s)
Marco Adrien Drozda	110 m hurdles	15.49	22

Field events

Athlete	Event	Distance	Position
Lukáš Beer	High jump	2.08	15

Women
Track & road events

Athlete	Event	Result	Rank
Monika Weigertová	100 m	11.99	20
Lucia Vadlejch	100 m hurdles	14.17	20

Field events

Athlete	Event	Distance	Position
Jana Velďáková	Long jump	6.08	12
Júlia Hanuliaková	Javelin throw	40.23	23

Mixed
Track & road events

Athlete	Event	Result	Rank
Šimon Bujna; Martin Kučera; Alexandra Štuková; Daniela Ledecká	4 x 400 m relay	3:20.66	5
Denis Danáč; Alexander Jablokov; Monika Weigertová; Alexandra Štuková	Mixed distance pursuit relay	4:36.47	15

Team

Athlete	Event	Qualification				Quarterfinals				Semifinals				Final			
Athlete	Event	Result	Points	Total points	Rank	Result	Points	Total points	Rank	Result	Points	Total points	Rank	Result	Points	Total points	Rank
Jana Velďáková	Women's long jump	1	12	49	4 q	6	2	47	5	Did not advanced							
Ján Volko	Men's 100 m	1	12	49	4 q	1	12	47	5	Did not advanced							
Júlia Hanuliaková	Women's javelin throw	6	2	49	4 q	6	2	47	5	Did not advanced							
Monika Weigertová	Women's 100 m	4	6	49	4 q	5	4	47	5	Did not advanced							
Šimon Bujna; Martin Kučera; Alexandra Štuková; Daniela Ledecká	Mixed 4x400 m relay	2	10	49	4 q	1	12	47	5	Did not advanced							
Marco Adrien Drozda	Men's 110 m hurdles	6	2	49	4 q	5	4	47	5	Did not advanced							
Lukáš Beer	Men's high jump	5	3	49	4 q	5	3	47	5	Did not advanced							
Lucia Vadlejch	Women's 100 m hurdles	6	2	49	4 q	3	8	47	5	Did not advanced							
Denis Danáč; Alexander Jablokov; Monika Weigertová; Iveta Putálová	Mixed distance pursuit relay	4	—N/a		4 q	5	—N/a		5	Did not advanced							

Reserves:

- Tomáš Zeman
- Jakub Bottlik
- Patrik Dӧmӧtӧr
- Stanislava Lajčáková

Key

- Note–Ranks given for track events are within the athlete's heat only
- Q = Qualified for the next round
- q = Qualified for the next round as a fastest loser or, in field events, by position without achieving the qualifying target
- NR = National record
- N/A = Round not applicable for the event
- Bye = Athlete not required to compete in round
- NM = No mark

== Badminton ==
Athlete	Event	Group stage				Round of 16	Quarterfinal	Semifinal	Final / BM	
Athlete	Event	Opposition Score	Opposition Score	Opposition Score	Rank	Opposition Score	Opposition Score	Opposition Score	Opposition Score	Rank
Martina Repiská	Women's singles	Pope (LAT); W 2-0	Tomolová (CZE); W 2-0	Blichfeldt (DEN); L 0-2	2 Q	Yiğit (TUR); L 0-2	Did not advanced			

== Boxing ==
Men

Athlete	Event	Round of 32	Round of 16	Quarterfinals	Semifinals	Final	
Athlete	Event	Opposition Result	Opposition Result	Opposition Result	Opposition Result	Opposition Result	Rank
Viliam Tankó	60 kg	Asanau (BLR); L 0-5	Did not advance				
Michal Takács	64 kg	McGivern (IRL); L 0-5	Did not advance				
Tomáš Zӧld	69 kg	Micallef (MON); L 0-5	Did not advance				
Andrej Csemez	75 kg	Beck (GER); W 3-2	Carapcevschi (MDA); W 3-2	Cuadrado (ESP); W 4-1	Khyzhniak (UKR); L RSC	Did not advance	3rd place, bronze medalist(s)
Matúš Strnisko	81 kg	Poletan (SRB); W 4-1	Smajli (SUI); W 5-0	Fiori (ITA); L 0-5	Did not advance		
Dávid Michálek	91 kg	Mouhiidine (ITA); L 0-5	Did not advance				

== Canoe sprint ==
Men

Athlete	Event	Heats		Semifinals		Finals	
Athlete	Event	Time	Rank	Time	Rank	Time	Rank
Csaba Zalka	K1 200 m	35.709	6 QS	35.430	7QFB	38.689	15
Ákos Gacsal	K1 1000 m	3:39.221	7 QS	3:30.890	6QFB	3:45.619	16
Samuel Baláž	K1 5000 m	N/A				23:11.310	15
Matej Rusnák	C1 1000 m	3:56.461	5 QS	3:50.989	5	Did not advanced	
Peter Gelle; Adam Botek	K2 1000 m	3:08.032	1 QF	N/A		3:19.338	5
Csaba Zalka; Samuel Baláž; Erik Vlček; Adam Botek	K4 500 m	1:19.049	2 QF	N/A		1:33.721	3rd place, bronze medalist(s)

Women

Athlete	Event	Heats		Semifinals		Finals	
Athlete	Event	Time	Rank	Time	Rank	Time	Rank
Ivana Mládková	K1 200 m	41.776	2 QS	41.357	2 Q	42.903	6
Ivana Mládková	K1 500 m	1:50.397	2 QS	1:50.246	3 Q	2:07.999	5
Gabriela Ladičová	C1 200 m	50.051	4 QS	52.241	2 Q	55.846	9
Mariana Petrušová	K1 5000 m	N/A				24:59.099	3rd place, bronze medalist(s)
Jessica Zatlkajová; Mariana Petrušová	K2 500 m	1:45.549	7 QS	1:43.535	7	Did not advanced	
Lucia Valová; Hana Mikéciová	C2 500 m	2:09.133	6 QS	2:08.139	6	Did not advanced	

== Cycling ==
=== Road ===
Athlete	Event	Time	Rank
Patrik Tybor	Men's road race	4:10:58	48
Patrik Tybor	Men's time trial	36:56.76	30
Marek Čanecký	Men's road race	4:10:58	57
Marek Čanecký	Men's time trial	36:16.33	23
Ján Andrej Cully	Men's road race	4:10:58	103
Juraj Bellan	Men's road race	4:10:58	83
Matúš Štoček	Men's road race	4:10:58	35
Alžbeta Bačíková-Pavlendová	Women's road race	3:09:36	57
Alžbeta Bačíková-Pavlendová	Women's time trial	43:06.96	28

=== Track ===
Sprint

Athlete	Event	Sprint points	Rank
Andrej Strmiska	Men's points race	DNF	
Tereza Medveďová	Women's points race	0	13

Pursuit

Athlete	Event	Qualification		Final	
Athlete	Event	Time	Rank	Opponent Results	Rank
Tereza Medveďová	Women's individual pursuit	3:45.423	11	Did not advanced	

Omnium

Athlete	Event	Scratch race		Tempo race		Elimination race		Points race		Total points	Rank
Athlete	Event	Rank	Points	Rank	Points	Rank	Points	Points	Rank	Total points	Rank
Martin Chren	Men's omnium	16	10	16	-40	16	10	DNF		DNF	
Alžbeta Bačíková-Pavlendová	Women's omnium	9	24	16	10	6	30	16	-20	44	15

Scratch

Athlete	Event	Final	
Athlete	Event	LAPs	Rank
Štefan Michalička	Men's scratch	DNF	
Alžbeta Bačíková-Pavlendová	Women's scratch	10	

Madison

Athlete	Event	Final	
Athlete	Event	Points	Rank
Tereza Medveďová; Alžbeta Bačíková-Pavlendová	Women's madison	-20	9

== Gymnastics ==
Men
Individual

Athlete	Event	Qualification		Final	
Athlete	Event	Points	Rank	Points	Rank
Slavomír Michňák	Men's pommel horse	14.400	6 Q	11.966	6

Women
Individual

Athlete	Event	Qualification						Final					
Athlete	Event	Apparatus				Total	Rank	Apparatus				Total	Rank
Athlete	Event	V	UB	BB	F	Total	Rank	V	UB	BB	F	Total	Rank
Chiara Bunce	All-around	13.100	11.566	11.400	11.566	47.632	23	Did not advanced					

== Judo ==
Athlete	Event	Round of 64	Round of 32	Round of 16	Quarterfinals	Semifinals	Repechage	Final / BM	
Athlete	Event	Opposition Result	Opposition Result	Opposition Result	Opposition Result	Opposition Result	Opposition Result	Opposition Result	Rank
Matej Poliak	Men's 66 kg	BYE	Managed (ISR); L 0s3-10	Did not advanced					
Filip Štancel	Men's 81 kg	BYE	Wieczerzak (GER); L 0-10	Did not advanced					
Peter Žilka	Men's 90 kg	Varapayeu (BLR); L 0s2-1	Did not advanced						
Milan Randl	Men's 90 kg	BYE	Trippel (GER); W 1-0	Mungai (ITA); W 1s2-0s1	Kochman (ISR); L 0s3-10s1	N/A	Chamberlain (GBR); L 1s3-10s2	Did not advanced	7
Viktória Majorošová	Women's 57 kg	N/A	Stefan (ROM); L 0-10	Did not advanced					

== Karate ==
Women

Athlete	Event	Group phase				Semifinal	Final / BM	
Athlete	Event	Opposition Score	Opposition Score	Opposition Score	Rank	Opposition Score	Opposition Score	Rank
Miroslava Kopúňová	Women's kumite 68 kg	Agier (FRA); L 0-2	Semeraro (ITA); L 1-5	Zaretska (AZE); L 0-6	4	Did not advanced		

== Sambo ==
Russia sent eight athletes for the sambo event.

Women

Athlete	Event	Quarterfinal	Semifinal	Repechage	Final / BM	
Athlete	Event	Opposition Result	Opposition Result	Opposition Result	Opposition Result	Rank
Sylvia Reviláková	−52 kg	Vidal (ESP); L 0-8	N/A	Eshanu (MDA); DNF	Did not advanced	

== Shooting ==
Men

Athlete	Event	Qualification		Final	
Athlete	Event	Points	Rank	Points	Rank
Juraj Tužinský	10 m air pistol	583	2 Q	198.5	4
Patrik Jány	10 m air rifle	627.8	6 Q	144.5	7
Matej Medveď	50 m rifle three positions	1141	34	Did not advanced	
Erik Varga	Trap	118	7	Did not advanced	
Marián Kovačócy	Trap	115	12	Did not advanced	

Women

Athlete	Event	Qualification		Final	
Athlete	Event	Points	Rank	Points	Rank
Martina Maršálková	10 m air pistol	553	32	Did not advanced	
Zuzana Rehák-Štefečeková	Trap	107	6 Q	16	6
Jana Špotáková	Trap	100	21	Did not advanced	
Danka Barteková	Skeet	112	9	Did not advanced	
Veronika Sýkorová	Skeet	114	8	Did not advanced	

Mixed

Athlete	Event	Qualification		Final	
Athlete	Event	Points	Rank	Points	Rank
Juraj Tužinský; Martina Maršálková	10 metre air pistol	569	13	did not advanced	
Erik Varga; Zuzana Rehák-Štefečeková	Trap	124	17	did not advanced	
Marián Kovačócy; Jana Špotáková	Trap	127	13	did not advanced	

== Table Tennis ==
Men

Athlete	Event	Round 1	Round 2	Round 3	Round 4	Quarterfinal	Semifinal	Final / BM	
Athlete	Event	Opposition Score	Opposition Score	Opposition Score	Opposition Score	Opposition Score	Opposition Score	Opposition Score	Rank
Ľubomír Pištej	Singles	BYE	Szocs (ROM); W 4-3	Freitas (POR); L 1-4	Did not advanced				
Yang Wang	Singles	BYE	Oostwouder (NED); W 4-0	Apolonia (POR); W 4-1	Tokic (SLO); W 4-2	Groth (DEN); L 3-4	Did not advanced		

Women

Athlete	Event	Round 1	Round 2	Round 3	Round 4	Quarterfinal	Semifinal	Final / BM	
Athlete	Event	Opposition Score	Opposition Score	Opposition Score	Opposition Score	Opposition Score	Opposition Score	Opposition Score	Rank
Taťjana Kukuľková	Singles	BYE	de Nutte (LUX); L 3-4	Did not advanced					
Barbora Balážová	Singles	BYE	BYE	Bergstrom (SWE); L 0-4	Did not advanced				

Mixed

Athlete	Event	Round 1	Quarterfinal	Semifinal	Final / BM	
Athlete	Event	Opposition Score	Opposition Score	Opposition Score	Opposition Score	Rank
Ľubomír Pištej; Barbora Balážová	Mixed doubles	Ni (LUX); Mladenovic (LUX); W 3-0	Martinez (ESP); Dvorak (ESP); W 3-0	Franziska (GER); Solja (GER); L 1-3	Flore (FRA); Gasnier (FRA); L 1-3	4

== Wrestling ==
Men's freestyle

Athlete	Event	Round of 16	Quarterfinal	Semifinal	Repechage 1	Repechage 2	Final / BM	
Athlete	Event	Opposition Result	Opposition Result	Opposition Result	Opposition Result	Opposition Result	Opposition Result	Rank
Achsarbek Gulajev	74 kg	Mykhailov (UKR); L 2-3	Did not advanced					
