= Table tennis at the 2019 European Games – Men's singles =

Table tennis – Men's singles at the 2019 European Games
- Venue: Tennis Olympic Centre
- Date: 22–26 June
- Competitors: 50 from 28 nations

Medalists
gold medal	Timo Boll	Germany
silver medal	Jonathan Groth	Denmark
bronze medal	Tomislav Pucar	Croatia

The men's singles in table tennis at the 2019 European Games in Minsk is the second edition of the event in a European Games. It was held at Tennis Olympic Centre from 22 June to 26 June 2019.

== Schedule ==
All times are FET (UTC+03:00)

Date	Time	Event
Saturday, 22 June 2019	11:00	First round
Saturday, 22 June 2019	17:00	Second round
Sunday, 23 June 2019	17:00	Third round
Monday, 24 June 2019	17:00	Fourth round
Tuesday, 25 June 2019	15:00	Quarterfinals
Wednesday, 26 June 2019	12:00	Semifinals
Wednesday, 26 June 2019	17:00	Bronze medal match
Wednesday, 26 June 2019	19:00	Gold medal match

== Seeds ==
The seeding lists were announced on 9 June 2019.

1. Timo Boll (GER)
2. Mattias Falck (SWE)
3. Dimitrij Ovtcharov (GER)
4. Liam Pitchford (GBR)
5. Vladimir Samsonov (BLR)
6. Simon Gauzy (FRA)
7. Kristian Karlsson (SWE)
8. Daniel Habesohn (AUT)
9. Emmanuel Lebesson (FRA)
10. Jonathan Groth (DEN)
11. Marcos Freitas (POR)
12. Tomislav Pucar (CRO)
13. Tiago Apolonia (POR)
14. Cédric Nuytinck (BEL)
15. Darko Jorgić (SLO)
16. Álvaro Robles (ESP)

== Draw ==
=== Key ===
- Q = Qualifier
- w/o = Walkover
- w/d = Withdraw
- r = Retired
- DQ = Disqualified

=== Finals ===
Semifinals
1	Timo Boll (GER)	11	11	11	10	11
12	Tomislav Pucar (CRO)	4	9	5	12	4
10	Jonathan Groth (DEN)	13	11	11	12
Kou Lei (UKR)	11	5	5	10

Gold medal match
1	Timo Boll (GER)	6	12	12	11	11	11
10	Jonathan Groth (DEN)	11	10	14	9	6	4
Bronze medal match
12	Tomislav Pucar (CRO)	11	9	11	11	11
Kou Lei (UKR)	2	11	9	7	2

=== Top half ===
==== Section 1 ====
Round 2
Dyjas (POL)	11	10	11	11	8	8	11
Tromer (NED)	6	12	2	6	11	11	9
Pištej (SVK)	5	11	11	11	2	9	11
Szőcs (ROU)	11	6	8	5	11	11	9
Skachkov (RUS)	11	11	8	11	11
Szudi (HUN)	9	7	11	6	7
Stoyanov (ITA)	13	11	11	11
Lambiet (BEL)	11	8	9	9

Round 3
1	Boll (GER)	11	12	11	11	14
Dyjas (POL)	7	14	4	1	12
11	Freitas (POR)	8	11	11	11	11
Pištej (SVK)	11	6	8	8	7
15	Jorgić (SLO)	11	11	5	5	2	13	10
Skachkov (RUS)	8	8	11	11	11	11	12
5	Samsonov (BLR)	11	14	12	10	11	11	11
Stoyanov (ITA)	8	16	14	12	9	2	9

Round 4
1	Boll (GER)	11	13	11	11
11	Freitas (POR)	7	11	8	7
Skachkov (RUS)	11	4	18	4	7	11
5	Samsonov (BLR)	8	11	16	11	11	13

Quarterfinals
1	Boll (GER)	10	11	16	12	11
5	Samsonov (BLR)	12	6	14	10	7

==== Section 2 ====
Round 1
Karakašević (SRB)	11	11	11	8	12
Puțuntică (MDA)	6	8	8	11	10

Round 2
Gardos (AUT)	12	8	11	11	10	12
Cantero (ESP)	10	11	7	5	12	10
Lind (DEN)	13	11	9	11	9	13
Karakašević (SRB)	11	3	11	8	11	11
Jančařík (CZE)	8	10	9	11	16	8
Pryshchepa (UKR)	11	12	11	14	5	11
Gionis (GRE)	11	11	13	11
Mladenovic (LUX)	8	6	11	7

Round 3
8	Karlsson (SWE)	9	11	8	11	11	11
Gardos (AUT)	11	6	11	9	7	9
9	Lebesson (FRA)	9	11	11	11	11
Lind (DEN)	11	4	8	9	9
12	Pucar (CRO)	11	11	13	6	11
Pryshchepa (UKR)	3	8	11	11	9
4	Pitchford (GBR)	6	9	10	11	10
Gionis (GRE)	11	11	12	6	12

Round 4
8	Karlsson (SWE)	6	7	9	11	14	5
9	Lebesson (FRA)	11	11	11	8	12	11
12	Pucar (CRO)	8	12	9	11	11	11
Gionis (GRE)	11	10	11	9	8	9

Quarterfinals
9	Lebesson (FRA)	12	10	10	7	6
12	Pucar (CRO)	10	12	12	11	11

=== Bottom half ===
==== Section 3 ====
Round 1
Oostwouder (NED)	11	11	11	11
Karabaxhak (KOS)	6	1	6	3

Round 2
Širůček (CZE)	9	12	12	11	11	9
Sgouropoulos (GRE)	11	14	14	8	2	11
Walker (GBR)	13	12	5	8	5	11	11
Platonov (BLR)	11	10	11	11	11	7	6
Wang (SVK)	11	11	11	11
Oostwouder (NED)	6	6	6	3
Tokič (SLO)	3	11	8	11	11	12
Stankevičius (LTU)	11	8	11	7	5	10

Round 3
3	Ovtcharov (GER)	11	11	11	11
Sgouropoulos (GRE)	5	3	9	3
10	Groth (DEN)	11	4	7	11	8	14	11
Walker (GBR)	4	11	11	5	11	12	7
13	Apolónia (POR)	9	11	7	6	8
Wang (SVK)	11	7	11	11	11
7	Habesohn (AUT)	11	9	3	6
Tokič (SLO)	13	11	11	11

Round 4
3	Ovtcharov (GER)	7	7	9	9
10	Groth (DEN)	11	11	11	11
Wang (SVK)	7	11	8	11	11	11
Tokič (SLO)	11	7	11	6	5	8

Quarterfinals
10	Groth (DEN)	11	7	12	10	12	11	11
Wang (SVK)	9	11	14	12	10	3	7

==== Section 4 ====
Round 2
Gaćina (CRO)	11	11	11	11
Ecseki (HUN)	3	7	9	4
Oláh (FIN)	w/o
Bobocica (ITA)
Ionescu (ROU)	13	8	5	11	6	8
Kou (UKR)	11	11	11	9	11	11
Shibaev (RUS)	11	11	11	11
Badowski (POL)	6	8	4	9

Round 3
6	Gauzy (FRA)	11	6	9	11	11	5	10
Gaćina (CRO)	9	11	11	8	9	11	12
14	Nuytinck (BEL)	11	11	7	11	11	11
Oláh (FIN)	3	4	11	5	13	9
16	Robles (ESP)	6	11	9	11	10
Kou (UKR)	11	13	11	8	12
2	Falck (SWE)	9	9	7	8
Shibaev (RUS)	11	11	11	11

Round 4
Gaćina (CRO)	9	8	11	8	11	11	11
14	Nuytinck (BEL)	11	11	8	11	8	3	13
Kou (UKR)	11	11	6	11	11
Shibaev (RUS)	9	4	11	7	9

Quarterfinals
14	Nuytinck (BEL)	12	8	8	8	11	10
Kou (UKR)	10	11	11	11	4	12
