= Estonia at the 2019 European Games =

- Flag of Estonia
- IOC code: EST
- NOC: Estonian Olympic Committee
- Website: www.eok.ee (in Estonian)

in Minsk, Belarus 21–30 June 2019
- Competitors: 68 in 13 sports
- Flag bearer: Liina Laasma
- Medals Ranked 35th: Gold 0 Silver 2 Bronze 3 Total 5

European Games appearances (overview)
- 2015; 2019; 2023; 2027

Estonia competed at the 2019 European Games, in Minsk, Belarus from 21 to 30 June 2019. Estonia sent 68 competitors, which was their all-time high in European Games. Of the 15 sports, Estonia took part in 13 – all sports besides beach soccer and table tennis.

== Medalists ==
| Medal | Name | Sport | Event | Date |
|---|---|---|---|---|
| Silver | Alo Jakin | Cycling | Men's road race | 23 June |
| Silver | Merike Anderson; Kadri-Ann Lass; Annika Köster; Janne Pulk | Basketball | Women's tournament | 24 June |
| Bronze | Epp Mäe | Wrestling | Women's freestyle 76 kg | 28 June |
| Bronze | Raul Must | Badminton | Men's singles | 29 June |
| Bronze | Pavel Artamonov | Karate | Men's kumite 75 kg | 30 June |

== Competitors ==
Estonia was represented by 68 athletes in 13 sports.

| Sport | Men | Women | Total |
|---|---|---|---|
| Archery | 1 | 2 | 3 |
| Athletics | 10 | 9 | 19 |
| Badminton | 3 | 3 | 6 |
| Basketball | 4 | 4 | 8 |
| Boxing | 6 | 0 | 6 |
| Canoe sprint | 1 | 0 | 1 |
| Cycling | 5 | 1 | 6 |
| Gymnastics | 0 | 5 | 5 |
| Judo | 5 | 0 | 5 |
| Karate | 1 | 0 | 1 |
| Sambo | 1 | 1 | 2 |
| Shooting | 1 | 1 | 2 |
| Wrestling | 3 | 1 | 4 |
| Total | 41 | 27 | 68 |

== Archery ==
Recurve

| Athlete | Event | Ranking round | | Round of 64 | Round of 32 | Round of 16 | Quarterfinals | Semifinals | Final / BM | Rank |
| Athlete | Event | Score | Seed | Opposition Score | Opposition Score | Opposition Score | Opposition Score | Opposition Score | Opposition Score | Rank |
|---|---|---|---|---|---|---|---|---|---|---|
| Märt Oona | Men's individual | 616 | 45 | Galiazzo (ITA); L 1–7 | Did not advance | | | | | 33 |
| Laura Nurmsalu | Women's individual | 623 | 27 | Straka (AUT); W 6–4 | Boari (ITA); L 2–6 | Did not advance | | | | 17 |

| Athlete | Event | Ranking round | | Round of 24 | Round of 16 | Quarterfinals | Semifinals | Final / BM | Rank |
| Athlete | Event | Score | Seed | Opposition Score | Opposition Score | Opposition Score | Opposition Score | Opposition Score | Rank |
|---|---|---|---|---|---|---|---|---|---|
| Märt Oona; Laura Nurmsalu | Mixed team | 1239 | 19 | Finland; L 0–6 | Did not advance | | | | 17 |

Compound

| Athlete | Event | Ranking round | | Round of 16 | Quarterfinals | Semifinals | Final / BM | Rank |
| Athlete | Event | Score | Seed | Opposition Score | Opposition Score | Opposition Score | Opposition Score | Rank |
|---|---|---|---|---|---|---|---|---|
| Meeri-Marita Paas | Women's individual | 694 | 9 | Tonioli (ITA); W 140(X)–140(8) | Ellison (SLO); L 139–141 | Did not advance | | 7 |

== Athletics ==
Track events

| Athlete | Event | Qualification | |
| Athlete | Event | Result | Rank |
|---|---|---|---|
| Hans-Christian Hausenberg | Men's 100 m | 11.12 | 22nd |
| Maarja Kalev | Women's 100 m | 12.11 | 23rd |
| ~~Keiso Pedriks~~ Johannes Treiel | Men's 110 m hurdles | 21.63 | 24th |
| Kreete Verlin | Women's 100 m hurdles | 13.98 | 16th |
| Jaak-Heinrich Jagor; Helin Meier; Marek Niit; Liis Roose | Mixed 4 × 400 m relay | 3:25.88 | 17th |
| Rasmus Kisel; Kelly Nevolihhin; Tony Nõu; Annika Sakkarias | Mixed medley relay | 4:37.07 | 17th |

Field events

| Athlete | Event | Qualification | |
| Athlete | Event | Distance | Position |
|---|---|---|---|
| Karl Lumi | Men's high jump | 2.11 | 9th |
| Kreete Verlin | Women's long jump | 5.76 | 21st |
| Liina Laasma | Women's javelin throw | 61.88 | 4th |

Team event

| Athlete | Event | Qualification | | | | | Quarterfinals | | | | | Semifinals | | | | | Final | | | | |
| Athlete | Event | Result | Event Rank | Points | Total points | Overall Rank | Result | Event Rank | Points | Total points | Rank | Result | Event Rank | Points | Total points | Rank | Result | Event Rank | Points | Total points | Rank |
|---|---|---|---|---|---|---|---|---|---|---|---|---|---|---|---|---|---|---|---|---|---|
| Hans-Christian Hausenberg | Men's 100m | 11.12 | 6 | 2 | 34 | 6 q | | | | | | | | | | | | | | | |
| Kreete Verlin | Women's long jump | — | 6 | 2 | 34 | 6 q | | | | | | | | | | | | | | | |
| Maarja Kalev | Women's 100m | 12.11 | 6 | 2 | 34 | 6 q | | | | | | | | | | | | | | | |
| Liina Laasma | Women's javelin throw | — | 2 | 10 | 34 | 6 q | | | | | | | | | | | | | | | |
| Liis Roose; Jaak-Heinrich Jagor; Marek Niit; Helin Meier | Mixed 4 × 400 m relay | 3:25.88 | 5 | 4 | 34 | 6 q | | | | | | | | | | | | | | | |
| Johannes Treiel | Men's 110m hurdles | 21.63 | 6 | 2 | 34 | 6 q | | | | | | | | | | | | | | | |
| Karl Lumi | Men's high jump | — | 3 | 8 | 34 | 6 q | | | | | | | | | | | | | | | |
| Kleanthi Santa | Women's 100m hurdles | 13.98 | 5 | 4 | 34 | 6 q | | | | | | | | | | | | | | | |
| Rasmus Kisel; Kelly Nevolihhin; Tony Nõu; Annika Sakkarias | Mixed distance pursuit relay | 4:53.42 | 6 | — | 34 | 6 q | | | | | | | | | | | | | | | |

Reserves:

- ~~Mari Klaup-McColl~~ Mirell Luik
- Johannes Treiel
- Enari Tonström
- Merilyn Uudmäe
- Sten Ütsmüts

== Badminton ==
| Athletes | Event | Group stage | | | | Round of 16 | Quarterfinals | Semifinals | Finals | Rank |
| Athletes | Event | Opposition Score | Opposition Score | Opposition Score | Rank | Opposition Score | Opposition Score | Opposition Score | Opposition Score | Rank |
|---|---|---|---|---|---|---|---|---|---|---|
| Raul Must | Men's singles | Moreels (BEL); W 21–17, 21–12 | Đurkinjak (CRO); W 21–19, 23–21 | Antonsen (DEN); L 10–21, 10–21 | 2 Q | Lale (TUR); W 21–14, 21–16 | Burestedt (SWE); W 16–21, 21–12, 21–12 | Leverdez (FRA); L 20–22, 8–21 | Did not advance | 3rd place, bronze medalist(s) |
| Kristin Kuuba | Women's singles | Ulitina (UKR); W 21–15, 15–21, 22–20 | Zetchiri (BUL); W 21–16, 21–11 | Yiğit (TUR); L 13–21, 11–21 | 2 Q | Li (GER); L 13–21, 21–14, 11–21 | Did not advance | | | 9 |
| Kristjan Kaljurand; Raul Käsner | Men's doubles | Gicquel / Labar (FRA); L 17–21, 10–21 | Ellis / Langridge (GBR); L 7–21, 14–21 | Magee / Reynolds (IRL); L 19–21, 16–21 | 4 | — | Did not advance | | | 13 |
| Kati-Kreet Marran; Helina Rüütel | Women's doubles | Lefel / Tran (FRA); L 19–21, 21–23 | Cherniavskaya / Zaitsava (BLR); W 21–13, 21–17 | Jaques / Vandenhoucke (BEL); W 21–13, 21–14 | 2 Q | — | Bolotova / Davletova (RUS); L 14–21, 15–21 | Did not advance | | 5 |

== Basketball 3x3 ==
Men

- Kristjan Evart
- Egert Haller
- Renato Lindmets
- Sander Viilup

| Team | Event | Group stage | | | | Quarterfinals | Semifinals | Final / BM | |
| Team | Event | Opposition Score | Opposition Score | Opposition Score | Rank | Opposition Score | Opposition Score | Opposition Score | Rank |
|---|---|---|---|---|---|---|---|---|---|
| Estonia | Men's tournament | Lithuania; L 13–21 | Slovenia; W 14–12 | Belarus; L 14–21 | 3 | Did not advance | | | |

Women

- Merike Anderson
- Kadri-Ann Lass
- Annika Köster
- Janne Pulk

| Team | Event | Group stage | | | | Quarterfinals | Semifinals | Final / BM | |
| Team | Event | Opposition Score | Opposition Score | Opposition Score | Rank | Opposition Score | Opposition Score | Opposition Score | Rank |
|---|---|---|---|---|---|---|---|---|---|
| Estonia | Women's tournament | Spain; L 13–15 | Latvia; W 22–6 | Ukraine; W 20–17 | 1 | Czech Republic; W 15–12 | Belarus; W 15–14 | France; L 8–21 | 2nd place, silver medalist(s) |

== Boxing ==
Key:

- WP – Win on points
- RSC – Referee stops contest

Men

| Athlete | Event | Round of 32 | Round of 16 | Quarterfinals | Semifinals | Final | |
| Athlete | Event | Opposition Result | Opposition Result | Opposition Result | Opposition Result | Opposition Result | Rank |
|---|---|---|---|---|---|---|---|
| Kirill Serikov | 52 kg | Bye | Cappai (ITA); L 0–5 WP | Did not advance | | | |
| Valeri Tsernoglavski | 60 kg | Skurdelis (LTU); L RSC | Did not advance | | | | |
| Semjon Karhanin | 64 kg | Safaryants (BLR); L 2–3 WP | Did not advance | | | | |
| Pavel Kamanin | 69 kg | Draganov (BUL); W 3–2 WP | McCormack (GBR); L 0–5 WP | Did not advance | | | |
| Stiven Aas | 81 kg | Chiriacov (MDA); L 2–3 WP | Did not advance | | | | |
| Ainar Karlson | 91 kg | Niedzwiecki (POL); W 3–2 WP | Clarke (GBR); L 0–5 WP | Did not advance | | | |

== Canoe sprint ==
Men

| Athlete | Event | Heats | | Semifinals | | Finals | |
| Athlete | Event | Time | Rank | Time | Rank | Time | Rank |
|---|---|---|---|---|---|---|---|
| Joosep Karlson | C-1 200 m | 43.955 | 6 QS | 43.177 | 9 | Did not advance | |
| Joosep Karlson | C-1 1000 m | 4:00.066 | 8 QS | 4:03.934 | 9 | Did not advance | |

== Cycling ==
Road

| Athlete | Event | Time | Rank |
|---|---|---|---|
| Alo Jakin | Men's road race | 4:10:20 | 2nd place, silver medalist(s) |
| Martin Laas | Men's road race | 4:10:58 | 13 |
| Karl Patrick Lauk | Men's road race | 4:22:26 | 107 |
| Mihkel Räim | Men's road race | 4:10:58 | 14 |
| Norman Vahtra | Men's road race | 4:11:07 | 69 |
| Norman Vahtra | Men's time trial | 35:55.63 | 18 |
| Mae Lang | Women's road race | 3:08:43 | 44 |

Track

| Athlete | Event | Scratch race | | Tempo race | | Elimination race | | Points race | | Total points | Rank |
| Athlete | Event | Points | Rank | Points | Rank | Points | Rank | Points | Rank | Total points | Rank |
|---|---|---|---|---|---|---|---|---|---|---|---|
| Norman Vahtra | Men's omnium | 18 | 12 | 22 | 10 | 14 | 14 | 17 | 7 | 71 | 10 |

== Gymnastics ==
=== Rhythmic ===
Women's group

| Athlete | Event | Final | |
| Athlete | Event | Total | Rank |
|---|---|---|---|
| Vasilina Kuksova; Carmely Reiska; Laurabell Kabrits; Arina Okamanchuk; Lera Teino | All-round | 44.750 | 7 |
| Vasilina Kuksova; Carmely Reiska; Laurabell Kabrits; Arina Okamanchuk; Lera Teino | 5 balls | 24.300 | 5 |
| Vasilina Kuksova; Carmely Reiska; Laurabell Kabrits; Arina Okamanchuk; Lera Teino | 3 hoops, 4 clubs | 20.450 | 8 |

== Judo ==
Men

| Athlete | Event | Round of 64 | Round of 32 | Round of 16 | Quarterfinals | Semifinals | Repechage | Final / BM | |
| Athlete | Event | Opposition Result | Opposition Result | Opposition Result | Opposition Result | Opposition Result | Opposition Result | Opposition Result | Rank |
|---|---|---|---|---|---|---|---|---|---|
| Ants Oscar Pertelson | 73 kg | Zingg (GER); L 0s2–10 | Did not advance | | | | | | |
| Kristjan Tõniste | 81 kg | Bye | Ntanatsidis (GRE); L 0s2–1 | Did not advance | | | | | |
| Klen-Kristofer Kaljulaid | 90 kg | Bye | Gviniashvili (GEO); L 0s1–11 | Did not advance | | | | | |
| Mattias Kuusik | 90 kg | Bye | Mungai (ITA); L 0s1–10 | Did not advance | | | | | |
| Grigori Minaškin | 100 kg | — | Dichev (BUL); W 10s1–0s2 | Gasimov (AZE); L 0–11 | Did not advance | | | | |

== Karate ==
Men

| Athletes | Event | Group stage | | | | Semifinals | Final | Rank |
| Athletes | Event | Opposition Score | Opposition Score | Opposition Score | Rank | Opposition Score | Opposition Score | Rank |
|---|---|---|---|---|---|---|---|---|
| Pavel Artamonov | Kumite 75 kg | Horuna (UKR); L 3–6 | Bitsch (GER); D 0–0 | Korabau (BLR); W 3–0 | 2 Q | Aghayev (AZE); L 1–2 | Did not advance | 3rd place, bronze medalist(s) |

== Sambo ==
Men

| Athlete | Event | Quarterfinals | Semifinals | Repechage | Final / BM | Rank |
| Athlete | Event | Opposition Result | Opposition Result | Opposition Result | Opposition Result | Rank |
|---|---|---|---|---|---|---|
| Vadim Fomin | 62 kg | Aniskevich (BLR); L 0–10 VS | Did not advance | Garayev (AZE); L 0–1 VO | Did not advance | 7 |

Women

| Athlete | Event | Quarterfinals | Semifinals | Repechage | Final / BM | Rank |
| Athlete | Event | Opposition Result | Opposition Result | Opposition Result | Opposition Result | Rank |
|---|---|---|---|---|---|---|
| Anna Ovtsarenko | 60 kg | Kostenko (RUS); L 0–9 VH | Did not advance | Ionescu (ROU); L 0–1 VS | Did not advance | 7 |

== Shooting ==
Men

| Athlete | Event | Qualification | | Final | |
| Athlete | Event | Points | Rank | Points | Rank |
|---|---|---|---|---|---|
| Peeter Olesk | 10 m air pistol | 574 | 17 | Did not advance | |
| Peeter Olesk | 25 metre rapid fire pistol | 573 | 11 | Did not advance | |

Women

| Athlete | Event | Qualification | | Final | |
| Athlete | Event | Points | Rank | Points | Rank |
|---|---|---|---|---|---|
| Anžela Voronova | 10 m air rifle | 609.1 | 41 | Did not advance | |
| Anžela Voronova | 50 m rifle three positions | 1156 | 18 | Did not advance | |

== Wrestling ==
Key:

- VFO – Victory by forfeit
- VPO – Victory by points – the loser without technical points
- VPO1 – Victory by points – the loser with technical points
- VSU – Victory by technical superiority – the loser without technical points and a margin of victory of at least 8 (Greco-Roman) or 10 (freestyle) points
- VSU1 – Victory by technical superiority – the loser with technical points and a margin of victory of at least 8 (Greco-Roman) or 10 (freestyle) points

Men's Greco-Roman

| Athlete | Event | Round of 16 | Quarterfinal | Semifinal | Repechage | Final / BM | |
| Athlete | Event | Opposition Result | Opposition Result | Opposition Result | Opposition Result | Opposition Result | Rank |
|---|---|---|---|---|---|---|---|
| Helary Mägisalu | 60 kg | Arnaut (ROU); L 2–7 VPO1 | Did not advance | | | | 13 |
| Artur Vititin | 130 kg | Alexuc (ROU); L 0–3 VPO | Did not advance | | | | 15 |

Men's freestyle

| Athlete | Event | Round of 16 | Quarterfinal | Semifinal | Repechage | Final / BM | Rank |
| Athlete | Event | Opposition Result | Opposition Result | Opposition Result | Opposition Result | Opposition Result | Rank |
|---|---|---|---|---|---|---|---|
| Aimar Andruse | 74 kg | Binenmpaoum (GRE); L 6–8 VPO1 | Did not advance | | | | 10 |

Women's freestyle

| Athlete | Event | Round of 16 | Quarterfinal | Semifinal | Final / BM | |
| Athlete | Event | Opposition Result | Opposition Result | Opposition Result | Opposition Result | Rank |
|---|---|---|---|---|---|---|
| Epp Mäe | 76 kg | Nemeth (HUN); W 3–0 VPO | Belinska (UKR); W 8–0 VPO | Marzaliuk (BLR); L 3–5 VPO1 | Vorobeva (RUS); W 5–3 VPO1 | 3rd place, bronze medalist(s) |
