= Martina Repiská =

Slovak badminton player (born 1995)

Personal information
- Born: 21 October 1995 (age 31) Zvolen, Slovakia
- Height: 1.71 m (5 ft 7 in)
- Weight: 68 kg (150 lb)

Sport
- Country: Slovakia
- Sport: Badminton
- Handedness: Right

Women's singles & doubles
- Highest ranking: 61 (WS 18 October 2022); 174 (WD with Camilla Martens 29 December 2016); 85 (XD with Milan Dratva 1 November 2018)
- BWF profile

Martina Repiská (Slovak pronunciation: [ˈmartina ˈrepiskaː]; born 21 October 1995) is a Slovak badminton player. In 2021 she became the third Slovak badminton player to take part in the Summer Olympics, as well as the first from her country to win a match in Olympic competition.

== Career ==
Repiská started playing badminton at the age of nine in her hometown, then playing competitively in junior international tournaments when she was twelve. She became a member of the national team in 2012, and won her first international title at the 2017 Morocco International tournament.

Repiská competed at the 2019 European Games in Minsk. In her first match in the women's singles, Repiská beat Ieva Pope of Latvia. After losing her second group match, she defeated Czech Kateřina Tomalová to finish the group with a record of two wins and a loss, which was enough to advance to the knockout stages of the competition. She faced Neslihan Yiğit of Turkey in her next match but lost in straight sets, exiting the competition in the round of 16.

In May 2021 it was confirmed that Repiská had qualified for the 2020 Tokyo Olympics, based on her world ranking of 69th position. With her country not having sent a player to the 2016 games, she became the third Slovak badminton player at the Olympics, and the first since Monika Fašungová in 2012. At the Olympics, Repiská won her opening match against Guatemalan opponent Nikté Sotomayor, becoming the first Slovak player to win a badminton match at the Olympics. In her second match she lost against Canadian ninth seed Michelle Li, resulting in her elimination from the tournament.
