= Badminton at the 2019 European Games – Women's singles =

Badminton's women's singles at the 2019 European Games
- Venue: Falcon Club
- Dates: 24–30 June
- Competitors: 32 from 29 nations

Medalists
gold medal	Mia Blichfeldt	Denmark
silver medal	Kirsty Gilmour	Great Britain
bronze medal	Line Kjærsfeldt	Denmark
bronze medal	Evgeniya Kosetskaya	Russia

The badminton women's singles tournament at the 2019 European Games was held from 24 to 30 June at Falcon Club.

== Competition format ==
The singles tournament is played with 32 participants, initially playing in eight groups of four, before the top two from each group qualifies for a 16-player knock-out stage.

=== Schedule ===
All times are in FET (UTC+03).

Start time	Session
24 June, 9:00	Group stage, matchday 1
25 June, 9:00	Group stage, matchday 2
26 June, 9:00	Group stage, matchday 3
27 June, 10:00	Round of 16
28 June, 10:00	Quarter-finals
29 June, 10:00	Semi-finals
30 June, 12:00	Final

== Seeds ==
Seeds for all badminton events at the 2nd European Games were announced on 29 May.

1. Line Kjærsfeldt (DEN) (bronze medal)
2. Mia Blichfeldt (DEN) (gold medal)
3. Kirsty Gilmour (GBR) (silver medal)
4. Evgeniya Kosetskaya (RUS) (bronze medal)
5. Yvonne Li (GER) (quarterfinals)
6. Beatriz Corrales (ESP) (group stage)
7. Neslihan Yiğit (TUR) (quarterfinals)
8. Chloe Birch (GBR) (quarterfinals)

== Results ==
The group stage draws was held on 4 June.

=== Group stage ===
==== Group A ====
Pos	Team	Pld	W	L	GF	GA	GD	PF	PA	PD	Qualification
1	Line Kjærsfeldt (DEN) [1]	3	3	0	6	0	+6	126	63	+63	Qualification to knock-out stage
2	Ksenia Polikarpova (ISR)	3	2	1	4	2	+2	114	84	+30	Qualification to knock-out stage
3	Lilit Poghosyan (ARM)	3	1	2	2	4	−2	73	120	−47	
4	Vlada Ginga (MDA)	3	0	3	0	6	−6	82	128	−46	

Source: TS

Date		Score		Set 1	Set 2	Set 3
24 June; 19:10	(Denmark) Line Kjærsfeldt	2–0	(Moldova) Vlada Ginga	21–10	21–8	
24 June; 19:50	(Israel) Ksenia Polikarpova	2–0	(Armenia) Lilit Poghosyan	21–8	21–6	
25 June; 21:00	Line Kjærsfeldt (Denmark)	2–0	(Israel) Ksenia Polikarpova	21–13	21–17	
25 June; 21:10	Vlada Ginga (Moldova)	0–2	(Armenia) Lilit Poghosyan	15–21	21–23	
26 June; 15:00	Vlada Ginga (Moldova)	0–2	(Israel) Ksenia Polikarpova	11–21	17–21	
26 June; 16:20	Line Kjærsfeldt (Denmark)	2–0	(Armenia) Lilit Poghosyan	21–12	21–3	

==== Group B ====
Pos	Team	Pld	W	L	GF	GA	GD	PF	PA	PD	Qualification
1	Mia Blichfeldt (DEN) [2]	3	3	0	6	0	+6	126	64	+62	Qualification to knock-out stage
2	Martina Repiská (SVK)	3	2	1	4	2	+2	106	103	+3	Qualification to knock-out stage
3	Kateřina Tomalová (CZE)	3	1	2	2	4	−2	97	105	−8	
4	Ieva Pope (LAT)	3	0	3	0	6	−6	59	126	−67	

Source: TS

Date		Score		Set 1	Set 2	Set 3
24 June; 20:30	Mia Blichfeldt (Denmark)	2–0	(Czech Republic) Kateřina Tomalová	21–11	21–12	
24 June; 21:10	Martina Repiská (Slovakia)	2–0	(Latvia) Ieva Pope	21–15	21–14	
25 June; 11:40	Kateřina Tomalová (Czech Republic)	2–0	(Latvia) Ieva Pope	21–15	21–6	
25 June; 15:10	Mia Blichfeldt (Denmark)	2–0	(Slovakia) Martina Repiská	21–11	21–11	
26 June; 09:00	Kateřina Tomalová (Czech Republic)	0–2	(Slovakia) Martina Repiská	14–21	18–21	
26 June; 10:20	Mia Blichfeldt (Denmark)	2–0	(Latvia) Ieva Pope	21–5	21–14	

==== Group C ====
Pos	Team	Pld	W	L	GF	GA	GD	PF	PA	PD	Qualification
1	Kirsty Gilmour (GBR) [3]	3	3	0	6	0	+6	126	65	+61	Qualification to knock-out stage
2	Marie Batomene (FRA)	3	2	1	4	2	+2	106	91	+15	Qualification to knock-out stage
3	Vytautė Fomkinaitė (LTU)	3	1	2	2	4	−2	95	107	−12	
4	Elisa Wiborg (NOR)	3	0	3	0	6	−6	62	126	−64	

Source: TS

Date		Score		Set 1	Set 2	Set 3
24 June; 10:20	Vytautė Fomkinaitė (Lithuania)	0–2	(France) Marie Batomene	12–21	16–21	
24 June; 12:20	Kirsty Gilmour (United Kingdom)	2–0	(Norway) Elisa Wiborg	21–5	21–13	
25 June; 13:40	Elisa Wiborg (Norway)	0–2	(France) Marie Batomene	12–21	9–21	
25 June; 18:00	Kirsty Gilmour (United Kingdom)	2–0	(Lithuania) Vytautė Fomkinaitė	21–14	21–11	
26 June; 17:00	Elisa Wiborg (Norway)	0–2	(Lithuania) Vytautė Fomkinaitė	10–21	13–21	
26 June; 19:30	Kirsty Gilmour (United Kingdom)	2–0	(France) Marie Batomene	21–12	21–10	

==== Group D ====
Pos	Team	Pld	W	L	GF	GA	GD	PF	PA	PD	Qualification
1	Evgeniya Kosetskaya (RUS) [4]	3	3	0	6	0	+6	126	63	+63	Qualification to knock-out stage
2	Lianne Tan (BEL)	3	2	1	4	2	+2	110	86	+24	Qualification to knock-out stage
3	Alesia Zaitsava (BLR)	3	1	2	2	4	−2	81	112	−31	
4	Eleni Christodoulou (CYP)	3	0	3	0	6	−6	70	132	−62	

Source: TS

Date		Score		Set 1	Set 2	Set 3
24 June; 13:40	Evgeniya Kosetskaya (Russia)	2–0	(Belgium) Lianne Tan	21–15	21–11	
24 June; 16:45	Eleni Christodoulou (Cyprus)	0–2	(Belarus) Alesia Zaitsava	13–21	15–21	
25 June; 11:15	Lianne Tan (Belgium)	2–0	(Belarus) Alesia Zaitsava	21–10	21–8	
25 June; 13:00	Evgeniya Kosetskaya (Russia)	2–0	(Cyprus) Eleni Christodoulou	21–7	21–9	
26 June; 18:00	Evgeniya Kosetskaya (Russia)	2–0	(Belarus) Alesia Zaitsava	21–11	21–10	
26 June; 18:20	Lianne Tan (Belgium)	2–0	(Cyprus) Eleni Christodoulou	21–8	21–18	

==== Group E ====
Pos	Team	Pld	W	L	GF	GA	GD	PF	PA	PD	Qualification
1	Yvonne Li (GER) [5]	3	3	0	6	0	+6	126	86	+40	Qualification to knock-out stage
2	Airi Mikkelä (FIN)	3	2	1	4	2	+2	115	108	+7	Qualification to knock-out stage
3	Ágnes Körösi (HUN)	3	1	2	2	4	−2	103	120	−17	
4	Rachael Darragh (IRL)	3	0	3	0	6	−6	97	127	−30	

Source: TS

Date		Score		Set 1	Set 2	Set 3
24 June; 21:50	Rachael Darragh (Republic of Ireland)	0–2	(Hungary) Ágnes Körösi	16–21	20–22	
24 June; 22:00	Yvonne Li (Germany)	2–0	(Finland) Airi Mikkelä	21–17	21–14	
25 June; 19:50	Yvonne Li (Germany)	2–0	(Republic of Ireland) Rachael Darragh	21–17	21–9	
25 June; 21:10	Airi Mikkelä (Finland)	2–0	(Hungary) Ágnes Körösi	21–14	21–17	
26 June; 13:00	Yvonne Li (Germany)	2–0	(Hungary) Ágnes Körösi	21–16	21–13	
26 June; 13:40	Airi Mikkelä (Finland)	2–0	(Republic of Ireland) Rachael Darragh	21–16	21–19	

==== Group F ====
Pos	Team	Pld	W	L	GF	GA	GD	PF	PA	PD	Qualification
1	Soraya de Visch Eijbergen (NED)	2	2	0	4	0	+4	84	41	+43	Qualification to knock-out stage
2	Maja Pavlinić (CRO)	2	1	1	2	2	0	61	71	−10	Qualification to knock-out stage
3	Anastasiya Cherniavskaya (BLR)	2	0	2	0	4	−4	51	84	−33	

Source: TS

Date		Score		Set 1	Set 2	Set 3
24 June; 17:20	Maja Pavlinić (Croatia)	0–2	(Netherlands) Soraya de Visch Eijbergen	13–21	6–21	
24 June; 17:30	Beatriz Corrales (Spain)	~~2–0~~	(Belarus) Anastasiya Cherniavskaya	~~21–16~~	~~21–8~~	
25 June; 09:00	Beatriz Corrales (Spain)	~~1–2~~	(Croatia) Maja Pavlinić	~~21–19~~	~~18–21~~	~~16–21~~
25 June; 10:30	Anastasiya Cherniavskaya (Belarus)	0–2	(Netherlands) Soraya de Visch Eijbergen	13–21	9–21	
26 June; 17:15	Anastasiya Cherniavskaya (Belarus)	0–2	(Croatia) Maja Pavlinić	18–21	11–21	
26 June; 18:45	Beatriz Corrales (Spain)	w/o	(Netherlands) Soraya de Visch Eijbergen			

==== Group G ====
Pos	Team	Pld	W	L	GF	GA	GD	PF	PA	PD	Qualification
1	Neslihan Yiğit (TUR) [7]	3	3	0	6	0	+6	126	83	+43	Qualification to knock-out stage
2	Kristin Kuuba (EST)	3	2	1	4	3	+1	124	125	−1	Qualification to knock-out stage
3	Linda Zetchiri (BUL)	3	1	2	2	5	−3	120	139	−19	
4	Marija Ulitina (UKR)	3	0	3	2	6	−4	148	163	−15	

Source: TS

Date		Score		Set 1	Set 2	Set 3
24 June; 11:15	Marija Ulitina (Ukraine)	1–2	(Estonia) Kristin Kuuba	15–21	21–15	20–22
24 June; 12:30	Neslihan Yiğit (Turkey)	2–0	(Bulgaria) Linda Zetchiri	21–16	21–16	
25 June; 19:30	Linda Zetchiri (Bulgaria)	0–2	(Estonia) Kristin Kuuba	16–21	11–21	
25 June; 19:50	Neslihan Yiğit (Turkey)	2–0	(Ukraine) Marija Ulitina	21–12	21–15	
26 June; 15:45	Neslihan Yiğit (Turkey)	2–0	(Estonia) Kristin Kuuba	21–13	21–11	
26 June; 16:30	Linda Zetchiri (Bulgaria)	2–1	(Ukraine) Marija Ulitina	21–23	21–17	21–15

==== Group H ====
Pos	Team	Pld	W	L	GF	GA	GD	PF	PA	PD	Qualification
1	Chloe Birch (GBR) [8]	3	3	0	6	1	+5	138	98	+40	Qualification to knock-out stage
2	Sabrina Jaquet (SUI)	3	2	1	5	2	+3	140	102	+38	Qualification to knock-out stage
3	Sonia Gonçalves (POR)	3	1	2	2	4	−2	90	102	−12	
4	Lia Šalehar (SLO)	3	0	3	0	6	−6	60	126	−66	

Source: TS

Date		Score		Set 1	Set 2	Set 3
24 June; 09:00	Chloe Birch (United Kingdom)	2–1	(Switzerland) Sabrina Jaquet	11–21	22–20	21–15
24 June; 09:40	Sonia Gonçalves (Portugal)	2–0	(Slovenia) Lia Šalehar	21–5	21–13	
25 June; 16:00	Sabrina Jaquet (Switzerland)	2–0	(Slovenia) Lia Šalehar	21–10	21–16	
25 June; 18:30	Chloe Birch (United Kingdom)	2–0	(Portugal) Sonia Gonçalves	21–14	21–11	
26 June; 17:00	Chloe Birch (United Kingdom)	2–0	(Slovenia) Lia Šalehar	21–5	21–11	
26 June; 18:20	Sabrina Jaquet (Switzerland)	2–0	(Portugal) Sonia Gonçalves	21–14	21–8	

=== Knock-out stage ===
Round of 16
1	Line Kjærsfeldt (DEN)	21	21
Airi Mikkelä (FIN)	12	5
7	Neslihan Yiğit (TUR)	21	21
Martina Repiská (SVK)	16	15
3	Kirsty Gilmour (GBR)	21	21
Lianne Tan (BEL)	13	16
Soraya de Visch Eijbergen (NED)	16	21	13
Sabrina Jaquet (SUI)	21	16	21
Kristin Kuuba (EST)	13	21	11
5	Yvonne Li (GER)	21	14	21
Maja Pavlinić (CRO)	7	11
4	Evgeniya Kosetskaya (RUS)	21	21
Marie Batomene (FRA)	15	15
8	Chloe Birch (GBR)	21	21
Ksenia Polikarpova (ISR)	9	23	17
2	Mia Blichfeldt (DEN)	21	21	21

Quarterfinals
1	Line Kjærsfeldt (DEN)	21	12	21
7	Neslihan Yiğit (TUR)	15	21	16
3	Kirsty Gilmour (GBR)	20	21	21
Sabrina Jaquet (SUI)	22	17	13
5	Yvonne Li (GER)	10	13
4	Evgeniya Kosetskaya (RUS)	21	21
8	Chloe Birch (GBR)	11	13
2	Mia Blichfeldt (DEN)	21	21

Semifinals
1	Line Kjærsfeldt (DEN)	21	16	8
3	Kirsty Gilmour (GBR)	13	21	21
4	Evgeniya Kosetskaya (RUS)	14	11
2	Mia Blichfeldt (DEN)	21	21

Final
3	Kirsty Gilmour (GBR)	16	17
2	Mia Blichfeldt (DEN)	21	21
