= Ireland at the 2019 European Games =

- IOC code: IRL
- NOC: Olympic Federation of Ireland
- Website: olympics.ie

in Minsk, Belarus 21 – 30 June 2019
- Competitors: 65 in 9 sports
- Flag bearer: Chloe Magee (badminton)
- Medals Ranked 31st: Gold 1 Silver 2 Bronze 4 Total 7

European Games appearances (overview)
- 2015; 2019; 2023; 2027

Ireland have sent 65 competitors to the 2019 European Games, in Minsk, Belarus from 21 to 30 June 2019.

== Medal summary ==
Medal	Name	Sport	Event	Date
Gold	Kurt Walker	Boxing	Bantamweight Boxing	30 June
Silver	Michaela Walsh	Boxing	Featherweight Boxing	29 June
Silver	Kellie Harrington	Boxing	Lightweight Boxing	30 June
Bronze	Gráinne Walsh	Boxing	Welterweight Boxing	28 June
Bronze	Regan Buckley	Boxing	Light Flyweight Boxing	28 June
Bronze	Michael Nevin	Boxing	Middleweight Boxing	28 June
Bronze	Sam Magee; Chloe Magee	Badminton	Mixed Doubles	29 June

== Archery ==
Recurve

Athlete	Event	Ranking round		Round of 64	Round of 32	Round of 16	Quarterfinals	Semifinals	Final / BM	
Athlete	Event	Score	Seed	Opposition Score	Opposition Score	Opposition Score	Opposition Score	Opposition Score	Opposition Score	Rank
Maeva Reidy	Women's individual	618	28	Laursen (DEN)						

== Athletics ==
- Men's High jump: Nelvin Appiah-Konadu
- Men's Sprint Stephen Gaffney
- Men's Hurdles: Gerard O'Donnell
- Women's Javelin: Grace Casey
- Women's Hurdles: Sarah Lavin
- Women's Long Jump: Sophie Meredith (athletics)
- Women's Sprint: Niamh Whelan
- Mixed 4x400m: Brandon Arrey, Andrew Mellon, Ciara Deely and Sinead Denny
- Mixed Pursuit Relay: Conall Kirk, Paul White, Victoria Harris and Amy O'Donoghue

== Badminton ==
Athletes	Event	Group stage				Round of 16	Quarterfinals	Semifinals	Finals	Rank
Athletes	Event	Opposition Score	Opposition Score	Opposition Score	Rank	Opposition Score	Opposition Score	Opposition Score	Opposition Score	Rank
Nhat Nguyen	Men's singles	Abián (ESP)	Wraber (AUT)	Nikolov (BUL)						
Rachael Darragh	Women's singles	Li (GER)	Mikkelä (FIN)	Korosi (HUN)						
Joshua Magee; Paul Reynolds	Men's doubles	Ellis / Langridge (GBR)	Kaljurand / Käsner (EST)	Gicquel / Labar (FRA)		—N/a				
Sam Magee; Chloe Magee	Mixed doubles	Gicquel / Delrue (FRA)	Konakh / Silich (BLR)	Dremin / Dimova (RUS)		—N/a				

== Basketball (3x3) ==
Not participating this year.

== Beach soccer ==
Not participating this year.

== Boxing ==
Women:

- Kellie Harrington
- Aoife O'Rourke
- Grainne Walsh
- Michaela Walsh

Men:

- Tony Browne
- Regan Buckley
- Dean Gardiner
- Brendan Irvine
- James McGivern
- Kieran Molloy
- Michael Nevin
- Kurt Walker
- Joseph Ward

== Canoeing ==
- Canoe sprint: Jenny Egan and Ronan Hughes

== Cycling ==
Men:

- Mark Downey
- Conor Dunne
- Robert-Jon McCarthy
- Ryan Mullen
- Michael O'Loughlin
- Felix English
- JB Murphy
- Marc Potts
- Fintan Ryan

Women:

- Alice Sharpe
- Lydia Boylan
- Mia Griffin
- Lydia Gurley
- Shannon McCurley
- Orla Walsh
- Robyn Stewart

== Gymnastics ==
- Emma Slevin
- Adam Steele

== Judo ==
- Nathon Burns
- Ben Fletcher
- Megan Fletcher

== Karate ==
No participants this year.

== Sambo ==
No participants this year.

== Shooting ==
- Women’s Shotgun Trap: Aoife Gormally

== Table tennis ==
No participants this year.

== Taekwondo ==
No participants this year.

== Wrestling ==
No participants this year.
