= Archery at the 2019 European Games – Women's individual compound =

Women's individual compound at the 2019 European Games
- Venue: Olympic Sports Complex
- Date: 21–26 June
- Competitors: 16 from 16 nations

Medalists
gold medal	Toja Ellison	Slovenia
silver medal	Natalia Avdeeva	Russia
bronze medal	Sophie Dodemont	France

The women's individual compound competition at the 2019 European Games was held from 21 to 26 June 2019 at the Olympic Sports Complex in Minsk, Belarus. 16 archers entered the competition.

== Ranking round ==
The ranking round took place on 21 June 2019 to determine the seeding for the knockout rounds. It consisted of two rounds of 36 arrows, with a maximum score of 720.

Rank	Archer	Nation	Score	10s	Xs
1	Toja Ellison	Slovenia	702	54	22
2	Natalia Avdeeva	Russia	698	50	17
3	Sophie Dodemont	France	697	52	21
4	Andrea Marcos	Spain	697	51	23
5	Yeşim Bostan	Turkey	697	50	19
6	Tanja Jensen	Denmark	696	49	21
7	Amanda Mlinarić	Croatia	695	48	21
8	Marcella Tonioli	Italy	694	52	19
9	Meeri-Marita Paas	Estonia	694	48	22
10	Sanne de Laat	Netherlands	691	45	21
11	Sarah Prieels	Belgium	689	44	19
12	Lucy Torrin Mason	Great Britain	681	40	19
13	Janine Meißner	Germany	680	35	9
14	Alena Kuzniatsova	Belarus	677	35	9
15	Styliani Kokkinou Georgiadou	Cyprus	667	29	9
16	Eowyn Marie Alburo Mamalias	Iceland	632	24	4

== Elimination round ==
Round of 16
1	Ellison (SLO)	144
16	Mamalias (ISL)	131
9	Paas (EST)	140 (X)
8	Tonioli (ITA)	140 (9)
5	Bostan (TUR)	140 (10)
12	Mason (GBR)	140 (9)
13	Meißner (GER)	143 (10*)
4	Marcos (ESP)	143 (10)
3	Dodemont (FRA)	143
14	Kuzniatsova (BLR)	142
11	Prieels (BEL)	142
6	Jensen (DEN)	145
7	Mlinarić (CRO)	142
10	De Laat (NED)	144
15	Kokkinou Georgiadou (CYP)	137
2	Avdeeva (RUS)	142

Quarterfinals
1	Ellison (SLO)	141
9	Paas (EST)	139
5	Bostan (TUR)	145
13	Meißner (GER)	139
3	Dodemont (FRA)	143
6	Jensen (DEN)	142
10	De Laat (NED)	143
2	Avdeeva (RUS)	147

Semifinals
1	Ellison (SLO)	145
5	Bostan (TUR)	143
3	Dodemont (FRA)	144
2	Avdeeva (RUS)	147

Gold medal match
1	Ellison (SLO)	144 (10)
2	Avdeeva (RUS)	144 (8)
Bronze medal match
5	Bostan (TUR)	142
3	Dodemont (FRA)	148
