= Croatia at the 2019 European Games =

- IOC code: CRO
- NOC: Croatian Olympic Committee
- Website: www.hoo.hr

in Minsk, Belarus 21 – 30 June 2019
- Competitors: 45 in 11 sports
- Medals Ranked 28th: Gold 2 Silver 1 Bronze 5 Total 8

European Games appearances (overview)
- 2015; 2019; 2023; 2027

Croatia competed at the 2019 European Games, in Minsk, Belarus from 21 to 30 June 2019. Croatia has previously competed at the 2015 European Games in Baku, Azerbaijan, where it won 11 medals, including one golds.

== Archery ==
Recurve

Athlete	Event	Ranking round		Round of 64	Round of 32	Round of 16	Quarterfinals	Semifinals	Final / BM	
Athlete	Event	Score	Seed	Opposition Score	Opposition Score	Opposition Score	Opposition Score	Opposition Score	Opposition Score	Rank
Matija Mihalić	Men's individual	626	42	Mosechvili (GEO); W 6–2	Wijler (NED); L 1–7	Did not advance				
Tihana Kovačić	Women's individual	617	30	Psarra (GRE); W 6–4	Kazlouskaya (BLR); L 0–6	Did not advance				
Matija Mihalić; Karyna Kazlouyuskaya	Mixed team	1243	18	—N/a	Greece; W 6–2	France; L 1–5	Did not advance			9

Compound

Athlete	Event	Ranking round		Round of 16	Quarterfinals	Semifinals	Final / BM	
Athlete	Event	Score	Seed	Opposition Score	Opposition Score	Opposition Score	Opposition Score	Rank
Mario Vavro	Men's individual	702	3	Juutilainen (FIN); W 145–142	Deloche (FRA); W 142–132	Schloesser (NED); L 141–145	BM; Ravenscroft (GBR); W 145–139	3rd place, bronze medalist(s)
Amanda Mlinarić	Women's individual	695	7	de Laat (NED); L 142–144	Did not advance			9
Mario Vavro; Amanda Mlinarić	Mixed team	1397	3	Bye	Italy; W 150–135	Netherlands; L 142–150	BM; Turkey; L 152–153	4

== Badminton ==
Athletes	Event	Group stage				Round of 16	Quarterfinals	Semifinals	Final	Rank
Athletes	Event	Opposition Score	Opposition Score	Opposition Score	Rank	Opposition Score	Opposition Score	Opposition Score	Opposition Score	Rank
Zvonimir Đurkinjak	Men's singles	Antonsen (DEN); L 0–2	Must (EST); L 0–2	Moreels (BEL); W 2–1	3	Did not advance				
Maja Pavlinić	Women's singles	de Visch Eijbergen (NED); L 0–2	Corrales (ESP); W 2–1	Cherniavskaya (BLR); W 2–0	2 Q	Kosetskaya (RUS); L 0–2	Did not advance			

== Boxing ==
Men

Athlete	Event	Round of 32	Round of 16	Quarterfinals	Semifinals	Final	
Athlete	Event	Opposition Result	Opposition Result	Opposition Result	Opposition Result	Opposition Result	Rank
Erik Pijetraj	64 kg	Di Lerni (ITA); L 0–5	Did not advance				
Marko Zeljko	69 kg	Behrami (KOS); L 0–4	Did not advance				
Mladen Sobjeslavski	75 kg	Darchinyan (ARM); L 0–5	Did not advance				
Damir Plantić	81 kg	Malkan (TUR); L 1–4	Did not advance				
Toni Filipi	91 kg	Bošnjak (BIH); W 3–2	Browne (IRL); W 4–1	Hámori (HUN); W 3–2	Gadzhimagomedov (RUS); L 3–2	Did not advance	3rd place, bronze medalist(s)
Marko Milun	+91 kg	Russo (ITA); W 5–0	Zavatin (MDA); W 5–0	Bakhtidze (GEO); W 5–0	Vykhryst (UKR); L RSC	Did not advance	3rd place, bronze medalist(s)

Women

Athlete	Event	Round of 16	Quarterfinals	Semifinals	Final	
Athlete	Event	Opposition Result	Opposition Result	Opposition Result	Opposition Result	Rank
Sara Beram	57 kg	Bruyevich (BLR); L 0–5	Did not advance			

== Canoe sprint ==
Athlete	Event	Heats		Semifinal		Final	
Athlete	Event	Time	Rank	Time	Rank	Time	Rank
Antun Novaković	Men's K-1 1000 metres	3:35.412	4 QS	3:31.059	7 QB	3:42.226	15
Vanesa Tot	Women's C-1 200 metres	50.026	5 QS	52.546	4	Did not advance	
Anamaria Govorčinović	Women's K-1 200 metres	45.886	7 QS	45.141	9	Did not advance	
Anamaria Govorčinović	Women's K-1 500 metres	1:55.765	6 QS	1:53.904	8 qB	2:09.813	13

== Judo ==
Athlete	Event	Round of 64	Round of 32	Round of 16	Quarterfinals	Semifinals	Repechage	Final / BM	
Athlete	Event	Opposition Result	Opposition Result	Opposition Result	Opposition Result	Opposition Result	Opposition Result	Opposition Result	Rank
Dominik Družeta	Men's −81 kg	Parlati (ITA); L 01–10	Did not advance						
Zlatko Kumrić	Men's −100 kg	—N/a	Iddir (FRA); W WO	Ohát (HUN); W 10–00	Mukete (BLR); W 10–00	Adamian (RUS); L 01–10	Bye	BM; Gasimov (AZE); L 00–10	5
Barbara Matić	Women's −70 kg	—N/a	Taeymans (BEL); W 10–00	Teltsidou (GRE); W 10–00	Gahié (FRA); L 00–11	Did not advance	Fletcher (IRL); W 11–00	BM; Pogorzelec (POL); W 10–01	3rd place, bronze medalist(s)
Karla Prodan	Women's −78 kg	—N/a	Bye	Wagner (GER); L 00–10	Did not advance				
Ivana Šutalo	Women's +78 kg	—N/a	Bye	M'Bairo (FRA); L 00–10	Did not advance				

== Karate ==
Athletes	Event	Group stage				Semifinals	Final	Rank
Athletes	Event	Opposition Score	Opposition Score	Opposition Score	Rank	Opposition Score	Opposition Score	Rank
Ivan Kvesić	84 kg	Karaqi (KOS); W 5–0	Malović (MNE); W 2–0	Chobotar (UKR); W 3–0	1 Q	Martina (ITA); W 8–0	Aktaş (TUR); W 0–0	1st place, gold medalist(s)
Anđelo Kvesić	+84 kg	Bitević (SRB); W 2–0	Vodchyts (BLR); W 2–2	Arkania (GEO); D 0–0	1 Q	Horne (GER); W 1–0	Gurbanli (AZE); L 0–1	2nd place, silver medalist(s)

== Sambo ==
Men

Athlete	Event	Quarterfinals	Semifinals	Final / BM	
Athlete	Event	Opposition Result	Opposition Result	Opposition Result	Rank
Dino-Dominic Sumpor	−74 kg	Abdullayev (AZE); W 4–3	Skryabin (RUS); L 0–4^{VH}	BM; Papou (BLR); L 1–2^{VH}	5

Women

Athlete	Event	Quarterfinals	Semifinals	Final / BM	
Athlete	Event	Opposition Result	Opposition Result	Opposition Result	Rank
Lucija Babić	−68 kg	Namazava (BLR); W 3–0	Budeanu (MDA); W 3–2	Moskalova (UKR); W 4–0	1st place, gold medalist(s)

== Shooting ==
Men

Athlete	Event	Qualification		Final	
Athlete	Event	Points	Rank	Points	Rank
Petar Gorša	10 m air rifle	624.4	21	Did not advance	
Miran Maričić	10 m air rifle	622.5	28	Did not advance	
Petar Gorša	50 m rifle three positions	1175	7 Q	427.5	5
Giovanni Cernogoraz	Trap	119	4 Q	18	6
Anton Glasnović	Trap	116	10	Did not advance	

Women

Athlete	Event	Qualification		Final	
Athlete	Event	Points	Rank	Points	Rank
Snježana Pejčić	10 m air rifle	624.3	19	Did not advance	
Marta Zeljković	10 m air rifle	618.5	38	Did not advance	
Snježana Pejčić	50 m rifle three positions	1151	26	Did not advance	
Marta Zeljković	50 m rifle three positions	1150	27	Did not advance	
Vlatka Pervan	25 m pistol	580	11	Did not advance	

Mixed team

Athlete	Event	Qualification		Semifinals		Final / BM	
Athlete	Event	Points	Rank	Points	Rank	Opposition Result	Rank
Snježana Pejčić; Petar Gorša	10 m air rifle	625.4	6 Q	414.2	6	Did not advance	
Marta Zeljković; Miran Maričić	10 m air rifle	622.2	14	Did not advance			
Snježana Pejčić; Petar Gorša	50 m rifle prone	411.1	14	Did not advance			

== Table tennis ==
Athlete	Event	Round 1	Round 2	Round 3	Round 4	Quarterfinals	Semifinals	Final / BM	
Athlete	Event	Opposition Result	Opposition Result	Opposition Result	Opposition Result	Opposition Result	Opposition Result	Opposition Result	Rank
Tomislav Pucar	Men's singles	Bye		Pryshchepa (UKR); W 4–1	Gionis (GRE); W 4–2	Lebesson (FRA); W 4–1	Boll (GER); L 1–4	BM; Lei (UKR); W 4–1	3rd place, bronze medalist(s)
Andrej Gaćina	Men's singles	Bye	Ecseki (HUN); W 4–0	Gauzy (FRA); W 4–3	Nuytinck (BEL); W 4–1	Did not advance			
Tomislav Pucar; Andrej Gaćina; Frane Kojić	Men's team	Belgium; W 3–1	—N/a			Sweden; L 2–3	Did not advance		
Mateja Jeger	Women's singles	Bye	Loeuillette (FRA); L 1–4	Did not advance					

== Wrestling ==
Athlete	Event	Round of 16	Quarterfinal	Semifinal	Repechage	Final / BM	
Athlete	Event	Opposition Result	Opposition Result	Opposition Result	Opposition Result	Opposition Result	Rank
Ivan Lizatović	−60 kg	Guliyev (AZE); W 4–0	Chkhartishvili (GEO); L 1–8	Did not advance			
Božo Starčević	−77 kg	Beşleaga (MDA); L 3–4	Did not advance				
Ivan Huklek	−87 kg	Mariea (ROU); W 9–0	Ozdoev (RUS); W 9–8	Abbasov (AZE); L 0–5	Bye	BM; Lőrincz (HUN); L 1–7	5
Ante Milković	−130 kg	Shariati (AZE); L 0–3	Did not advance				
