= Badminton at the 2019 European Games – Men's doubles =

Badminton's men's doubles at the 2019 European Games
- Venue: Falcon Club
- Dates: 24–29 June
- Competitors: 32 from 16 nations

Medalists
gold medal	Marcus Ellis; Chris Langridge	Great Britain
silver medal	Kim Astrup Sørensen; Anders Skaarup Rasmussen	Denmark
bronze medal	Vladimir Ivanov; Ivan Sozonov	Russia
bronze medal	Jelle Maas; Robin Tabeling	Netherlands

The badminton men's doubles tournament at the 2019 European Games was held from 24 to 29 June at Falcon Club.

== Competition format ==
The doubles tournament is played with 16 pairs, initially playing in four groups of four, before the top two from each group qualifies for an 8-pair knock-out stage.

=== Schedule ===
All times are in FET (UTC+03).

Start time	Session
24 June, 9:00	Group stage, matchday 1
25 June, 9:00	Group stage, matchday 2
26 June, 9:00	Group stage, matchday 3
27 June, 17:00	Quarter-finals
28 June, 18:00	Semi-finals
29 June, 18:00	Final

== Seeds ==
Seeds for all badminton events at the 2nd European Games were announced on 29 May.

1. Kim Astrup Sørensen / Anders Skaarup Rasmussen (DEN) (silver medal)
2. Marcus Ellis / Chris Langridge (GBR) (gold medal)
3. Vladimir Ivanov / Ivan Sozonov (RUS) (bronze medal)
4. Mark Lamsfuß / Marvin Emil Seidel (GER) (quarterfinals)

== Results ==
The group stage draws was held on 4 June.

=== Group stage ===
==== Group A ====
Pos	Team	Pld	W	L	GF	GA	GD	PF	PA	PD	Qualification
1	Kim Astrup Sørensen / Anders Skaarup Rasmussen (DEN) [1]	2	2	0	4	0	+4	85	54	+31	Qualification to knock-out stage
2	Jelle Maas / Robin Tabeling (NED)	2	1	1	2	2	0	74	69	+5	Qualification to knock-out stage
3	Giovanni Greco / Kevin Strobl (ITA)	2	0	2	0	4	−4	48	84	−36	
—	Miłosz Bochat / Adam Cwalina (POL)	0	0	0	0	0	0	0	0	0	Retired

Source: TS

Date		Score		Set 1	Set 2	Set 3
24 June; 11:40	Giovanni Greco (Italy); Kevin Strobl (Italy)	0–2	(Netherlands) Jelle Maas (Netherlands) Robin Tabeling	15–21	11–21	
24 June; 21:15	Kim Astrup Sørensen (Denmark); Anders Skaarup Rasmussen (Denmark)	~~2–1~~	(Poland) Miłosz Bochat (Poland) Adam Cwalina	~~20–22~~	~~21–10~~	~~21–14~~
25 June; 14:20	Kim Astrup Sørensen (Denmark); Anders Skaarup Rasmussen (Denmark)	2–0	(Italy) Giovanni Greco (Italy) Kevin Strobl	21–15	21–7	
25 June; 17:30	Miłosz Bochat (Poland); Adam Cwalina (Poland)	~~1–2~~	(Netherlands) Jelle Maas (Netherlands) Robin Tabeling	~~21–18~~	~~19–21~~	~~13–21~~
26 June; 13:30	Kim Astrup Sørensen (Denmark); Anders Skaarup Rasmussen (Denmark)	2–0	(Netherlands) Jelle Maas (Netherlands) Robin Tabeling	22–20	21–12	
26 June; 13:40	Miłosz Bochat (Poland); Adam Cwalina (Poland)	Retired	(Italy) Giovanni Greco (Italy) Kevin Strobl	18–21	0^{r}–0	

==== Group B ====
Pos	Team	Pld	W	L	GF	GA	GD	PF	PA	PD	Qualification
1	Marcus Ellis / Chris Langridge (GBR) [2]	3	3	0	6	0	+6	126	78	+48	Qualification to knock-out stage
2	Thom Gicquel / Ronan Labar (FRA)	3	2	1	4	2	+2	117	87	+30	Qualification to knock-out stage
3	Joshua Magee / Paul Reynolds (IRL)	3	1	2	2	4	−2	84	119	−35	
4	Kristjan Kaljurand / Raul Käsner (EST)	3	0	3	0	6	−6	83	126	−43	

Source: TS

Date		Score		Set 1	Set 2	Set 3
24 June; 11:00	Kristjan Kaljurand (Estonia); Raul Käsner (Estonia)	0–2	(France) Thom Gicquel (France) Ronan Labar	17–21	10–21	
24 June; 19:00	Marcus Ellis (United Kingdom); Chris Langridge (United Kingdom)	2–0	(Republic of Ireland) Joshua Magee (Republic of Ireland) Paul Reynolds	21–11	21–13	
25 June; 10:20	Marcus Ellis (United Kingdom); Chris Langridge (United Kingdom)	2–0	(Estonia) Kristjan Kaljurand (Estonia) Raul Käsner	21–7	21–14	
25 June; 16:00	Joshua Magee (Republic of Ireland); Paul Reynolds (Republic of Ireland)	0–2	(France) Thom Gicquel (France) Ronan Labar	10–21	8–21	
26 June; 10:20	Joshua Magee (Republic of Ireland); Paul Reynolds (Republic of Ireland)	2–0	(Estonia) Kristjan Kaljurand (Estonia) Raul Käsner	21–19	21–16	
26 June; 11:15	Marcus Ellis (United Kingdom); Chris Langridge (United Kingdom)	2–0	(France) Thom Gicquel (France) Ronan Labar	21–15	21–18	

==== Group C ====
Pos	Team	Pld	W	L	GF	GA	GD	PF	PA	PD	Qualification
1	Vladimir Ivanov / Ivan Sozonov (RUS) [3]	3	3	0	6	0	+6	126	52	+74	Qualification to knock-out stage
2	Anton Kaisti / Oskari Larkimo (FIN)	3	2	1	4	2	+2	106	111	−5	Qualification to knock-out stage
3	Jaromír Janáček / Tomáš Švejda (CZE)	3	1	2	2	4	−2	89	115	−26	
4	Sturla Flåten Jørgensen / Carl Christian Mork (NOR)	3	0	3	0	6	−6	84	127	−43	

Source: TS

Date		Score		Set 1	Set 2	Set 3
24 June; 13:15	Vladimir Ivanov (Russia); Ivan Sozonov (Russia)	2– 0	(Finland) Anton Kaisti (Finland) Oskari Larkimo	21–9	21–11	
24 June; 13:40	Sturla Flåten Jørgensen (Norway); Carl Christian Mork (Norway)	0–2	(Czech Republic) Jaromír Janáček (Czech Republic) Tomáš Švejda	13–21	17–21	
25 June; 11:40	Anton Kaisti (Finland); Oskari Larkimo (Finland)	2–0	(Czech Republic) Jaromír Janáček (Czech Republic) Tomáš Švejda	22–20	21–12	
25 June; 13:00	Vladimir Ivanov (Russia); Ivan Sozonov (Russia)	2–0	(Norway) Sturla Flåten Jørgensen (Norway) Carl Christian Mork	21–8	21–9	
26 June; 18:50	Vladimir Ivanov (Russia); Ivan Sozonov (Russia)	2–0	(Czech Republic) Jaromír Janáček (Czech Republic) Tomáš Švejda	21–7	21–8	
26 June; 20:00	Anton Kaisti (Finland); Oskari Larkimo (Finland)	2–0	(Norway) Sturla Flåten Jørgensen (Norway) Carl Christian Mork	21–17	22–20	

==== Group D ====
Pos	Team	Pld	W	L	GF	GA	GD	PF	PA	PD	Qualification
1	Mark Lamsfuß / Marvin Emil Seidel (GER) [4]	3	3	0	6	0	+6	126	69	+57	Qualification to knock-out stage
2	Alex Vlaar / Dimitar Yanakiev (BUL)	3	2	1	4	2	+2	104	93	+11	Qualification to knock-out stage
3	Philip Birker / Dominik Stipsits (AUT)	3	1	2	2	4	−2	102	111	−9	
4	Glib Beketov / Mykhaylo Makhnovskiy (UKR)	3	0	3	0	6	−6	67	126	−59	

Source: TS

Date		Score		Set 1	Set 2	Set 3
24 June; 16:40	Glib Beketov (Ukraine); Mykhaylo Makhnovskiy (Ukraine)	0–2	(Bulgaria) Alex Vlaar (Bulgaria) Dimitar Yanakiev	10–21	12–21	
24 June; 18:00	Mark Lamsfuß (Germany); Marvin Emil Seidel (Germany)	2–0	(Austria) Philip Birker (Austria) Dominik Stipsits	21–16	21–15	
25 June; 16:40	Philip Birker (Austria); Dominik Stipsits (Austria)	0–2	(Bulgaria) Alex Vlaar (Bulgaria) Dimitar Yanakiev	10–21	19–21	
25 June; 16:45	Mark Lamsfuß (Germany); Marvin Emil Seidel (Germany)	2–0	(Ukraine) Glib Beketov (Ukraine) Mykhaylo Makhnovskiy	21–3	21–15	
26 June; 11:40	Philip Birker (Austria); Dominik Stipsits (Austria)	2–0	(Ukraine) Glib Beketov (Ukraine) Mykhaylo Makhnovskiy	21–16	21–11	
26 June; 11:40	Mark Lamsfuß (Germany); Marvin Emil Seidel (Germany)	2–0	(Bulgaria) Alex Vlaar (Bulgaria) Dimitar Yanakiev	21–10	21–10	

=== Knock-out stage ===
Quarterfinals
1	Kim Astrup Sørensen (DEN); Anders Skaarup Rasmussen (DEN)	23	20	21
Thom Gicquel (FRA); Ronan Labar (FRA)	21	22	17
3	Vladimir Ivanov (RUS); Ivan Sozonov (RUS)	21	21
Alex Vlaar (BUL); Dimitar Yanakiev (BUL)	15	18
Jelle Maas (NED); Robin Tabeling (NED)	16	21	21
4	Mark Lamsfuß (GER); Marvin Emil Seidel (GER)	21	17	18
Anton Kaisti (FIN); Oskari Larkimo (FIN)	17	14
2	Marcus Ellis (GBR); Chris Langridge (GBR)	21	21

Semifinals
1	Kim Astrup Sørensen (DEN); Anders Skaarup Rasmussen (DEN)	21	21
3	Vladimir Ivanov (RUS); Ivan Sozonov (RUS)	17	17
Jelle Maas (NED); Robin Tabeling (NED)	18	16
2	Marcus Ellis (GBR); Chris Langridge (GBR)	21	21

Final
1	Kim Astrup Sørensen (DEN); Anders Skaarup Rasmussen (DEN)	17	10
2	Marcus Ellis (GBR); Chris Langridge (GBR)	21	21
