= Iceland at the 2019 European Games =

- IOC code: ISL
- NOC: National Olympic and Sports Association of Iceland
- Website: www.isi.is

in Minsk, Belarus 21 – 30 June 2019
- Competitors: 7 in 5 sports
- Flag bearer: Ásgeir Sigurgeirsson (shooting)
- Medals Ranked 44th: Gold 0 Silver 0 Bronze 0 Total 0

European Games appearances (overview)
- 2015; 2019; 2023; 2027

Iceland competed at the 2019 European Games, in Minsk, Belarus from 21 to 30 June 2019. Iceland has previously competed at the 2015 European Games in Baku, Azerbaijan.

== Archery ==
Compound

Athlete	Event	Ranking round		Round of 64	Round of 32	Round of 16	Quarterfinals	Semifinals	Final / BM	
Athlete	Event	Score	Seed	Opposition Score	Opposition Score	Opposition Score	Opposition Score	Opposition Score	Opposition Score	Rank
Eowyn Marie Alburo Mamalias	Women's individual	632	16	Ellison (SLO); L 131–144	Did not advance					

== Badminton ==
Athletes	Event	Group stage				Round of 16	Quarterfinals	Semifinals	Final	Rank
Athletes	Event	Opposition Score	Opposition Score	Opposition Score	Rank	Opposition Score	Opposition Score	Opposition Score	Opposition Score	Rank
Kári Gunnarsson	Men's singles	Kirchmayr (SUI); L 1–2	Leverdez (FRA); L 0–2	Milić (SRB); L RET	–	Did not advance				

== Gymnastics ==
=== Artistic ===
Men

Athlete	Event	Floor (gymnastics)		Horizontal bar		Parallel bars		Pommel horse		Rings (gymnastics)		Vault (gymnastics)		Total All-Around	
Athlete	Event	Score	Rank	Score	Rank	Score	Rank	Score	Rank	Score	Rank	Score	Rank	Score	Rank
Valgard Reinhardsson	All-around	13.333	23	12.066	31	10.533	33	11.966	34	12.633	25	12.916	10	73.364	27

Women

Athlete	Event	Floor (gymnastics)		Balance beam		Uneven bars		Vault (gymnastics)		Total All-Around	
Athlete	Event	Score	Rank	Score	Rank	Score	Rank	Score	Rank	Score	Rank
Agnes Suto-Tuuha	All-around	11.233	30	10.800	32	11.533	27	12.933	–	46.499	28

== Judo ==
Men

Athlete	Event	Round of 64	Round of 32	Round of 16	Quarterfinals	Semi-finals	Repechage	Final/BM	Rank
Athlete	Event	Opposition Result	Opposition Result	Opposition Result	Opposition Result	Opposition Result	Opposition Result	Opposition Result	Rank
Sveinbjörn Iura	81 kg	Bye	Ivanov (BUL); L 0–11	Did not advance					

== Shooting ==
Men

Athlete	Event	Qualification				Final	
Athlete	Event	1		2		Final	
Athlete	Event	Score	Rank	Score	Rank	Score	Rank
Ásgeir Sigurgeirsson	10m air pistol	565	32	—		Did not advance	
Hákon Svavarsson	Skeet	67	25	109	26	Did not advance	
