= Finland at the 2019 European Games =

- IOC code: FIN
- NOC: Finnish Olympic Committee
- Website: www.olympiakomitea.fi

in Minsk, Belarus 21 – 30 June 2019
- Competitors: 69 in 13 sports
- Flag bearer: Elina Gustafsson (boxing)
- Medals Ranked 30th: Gold 2 Silver 0 Bronze 1 Total 3

European Games appearances (overview)
- 2015; 2019; 2023; 2027

Finland competed at the 2019 European Games, in Minsk, Belarus from 21 to 30 June 2019. Finland has previously competed at the 2015 European Games in Baku, Azerbaijan, where it won 1 medal.

== Medalists ==
Medal	Name	Sport	Event	Date
Gold	Mira Potkonen	Boxing	Women's 60 kg	30 June
Gold	Emil Soravuo	Gymnastics	Men's floor exercise	30 June
Bronze	Titta Keinänen	Karate	Women's Kumite +68kg	29 June

== Archery ==
Recurve

Athlete	Event	Ranking round		Round of 64	Round of 32	Round of 16	Quarterfinals	Semifinals	Final / BM	
Athlete	Event	Score	Seed	Opposition Score	Opposition Score	Opposition Score	Opposition Score	Opposition Score	Opposition Score	Rank
Samuli Piippo	Men's individual	638	36	Karageorgiou (GRE); L 0–6	Did not advance					
Taru Kuoppa	Women's individual	626	23	Umer (SLO); W 6–0	Anagöz (TUR); W 6–0	Balsukova (RUS); L 0–6	Did not advance			
Samuli Piippo; Taru Kuoppa	Mixed team	1264	14	—	Estonia; W 6–0	Turkey; L 1–5	Did not advance			

Compound

Athlete	Event	Ranking round		Round of 16	Quarterfinals	Semifinals	Final / BM	
Athlete	Event	Score	Seed	Opposition Score	Opposition Score	Opposition Score	Opposition Score	Rank
Mikko Juutilainen	Men's individual	683	14	Vavro (CRO)	Did not advance			

== Badminton ==
Athletes	Event	Group stage				Round of 16	Quarterfinals	Semifinals	Final	Rank
Athletes	Event	Opposition Score	Opposition Score	Opposition Score	Rank	Opposition Score	Opposition Score	Opposition Score	Opposition Score	Rank
Eetu Heino	Men's singles	Maddaloni (ITA); W 2–0	Ivanič (SLO); W 2–0	Zilberman (ISR); L 0–2	2	Malkov (RUS); L 0–2	Did not advance			
Airi Mikkelä	Women's singles	Li (GER); L 0–2	Korosi (HUN); W 2–0	Darragh (IRL); W 2–0	2	Kjærsfeldt (DEN); L 0–2	Did not advance			
Anton Kaisti; Oskari Larkimo	Men's doubles	Ivanov / Sozonov (RUS); L 0–2	Janàček / Švejda (CZE); W 2–0	Flåten Jørgensen / Mork (NOR); W 2–0	2	—	Ellis / Langridge (GBR); L 0–2	Did not advance		

== Boxing ==
Men

Athlete	Event	Round of 64	Round of 32	Round of 16	Quarterfinal	Semifinal	Final	
Athlete	Event	Opposition Result	Opposition Result	Opposition Result	Opposition Result	Opposition Result	Opposition Result	Rank
Muhammad Abdilrasoon	75 kg	Venko (SLO); W 5–0	Khyzhniak (RUS); L 0–5	Did not advance				
Krenar Aliu	91 kg	—	Biro (ROU); W 3–2	Smiahlikau (BLR); L 0–5	Did not advance			
Arslan Khataev	60 kg	—	Doğan (TUR); L 0–5	Did not advance				

Women

Athlete	Event	Round of 16	Quarterfinal	Semifinal	Final	
Athlete	Event	Opposition Result	Opposition Result	Opposition Result	Opposition Result	Rank
Elina Gustafsson	69 kg	Bye	Walsh (IRL); L 0–5	Did not advance		
Mira Potkonen	60 kg	—	Yarshevich (BLR); W 5–0	Belyakova (RUS); W 4–0	Harrington (IRL); W WO	1st place, gold medalist(s)

== Gymnastics ==
Athlete	Stage	Apparatus						All-Around
Athlete	Stage	FX Rank	HB Rank	PB Rank	PH Rank	SR Rank	VT Rank	All-Around
Oskar Kirmes	Qualification	14.366; 4	11.733; 32	13.000; 18	12.766; 35	13.700; 20	11.933	77.498; 23
Oskar Kirmes	Final	dna	dna	dna	dna	dna	dna	dna
Emil Soravuo	Qualification	14.600; 1 Q	—	—	—	—	—	—
Emil Soravuo	Final	14.433 (gold)	—	—	—	—	—	—

== Judo ==
Athlete	Event	Round of 32	Round of 16	Quarterfinal	Semifinal	Repechage	Final / BM	
Athlete	Event	Opposition Result	Opposition Result	Opposition Result	Opposition Result	Opposition Result	Opposition Result	Rank
Katri Kakko	Women's 52 kg	Mammadaliyeva (AZE); L 0 – 1s1	Did not advance					
Emilia Kanerva	Women's 63 kg	Sharir (ISR); L 0h – 10	Did not advance					
Aatu Laamanen	Men's 90 kg	Tóth (HUN); L 0s2 – 11s1	Did not advance					

== Karate ==
Athlete	Event	Elimination Rounds			Semifinal	Final	
Athlete	Event	Opposition Score	Opposition Score	Opposition Score	Opposition Score	Opposition Score	Rank
Titta Keinänen	Women's Kumite +68kg	Chatziliadou (GRE); D 0–0	Ferracuti (ITA); D 0–0	Antunovic (SWE); W 3–0	Hocaoğlu (TUR); L 0–0 hantei	Did not advance	3rd place, bronze medalist(s)

== Shooting ==
Men

Athlete	Event	Qualification		Final	
Athlete	Event	Points	Rank	Points	Rank
Juho Kurki	10 metre air rifle	624.6	19	Did not advance	
Juho Kurki	50 metre rifle three positions	1173	8 Q	404.0	8
Vesa Törnroos	Trap	97	32	Did not advance	
Oskari Kossi	Skeet	113	22	Did not advance	
Tommi Takanen	Skeet	114	20	Did not advance	

Women

Athlete	Event	Qualification		Final	
Athlete	Event	Points	Rank	Points	Rank
Emmi Hyrkäs	10 metre air rifle	623.3	24	Did not advance	
Jenna Kuisma	10 metre air rifle	622.8	28	Did not advance	
Emmi Hyrkäs	50 metre rifle three positions	1145	33	Did not advance	
Jenna Kuisma	50 metre rifle three positions	1147	31	Did not advance	
Satu Mäkelä-Nummela	Trap	109	5 Q	20	5
Marika Salmi	Trap	112	3 Q	29	4
Marjut Heinonen	Skeet	115	5 Q	14	6

Mixed team

Athlete	Event	Qualification		Final	
Athlete	Event	Points	Rank	Points	Rank
Emmi Hyrkäs; Juho Kurki	50 metre rifle prone	411.0	15	Did not advance	
Vesa Törnroos; Satu Mäkelä-Nummela	Trap	123	18	Did not advance	
Oskari Kossi; Marjut Heinonen	Skeet	129	18	Did not advance	

== Table tennis ==
Athlete	Event	Round 1	Round 2	Round 3	Round 4	Quarterfinal	Semifinal	Final / BM	
Athlete	Event	Opposition Result	Opposition Result	Opposition Result	Opposition Result	Opposition Result	Opposition Result	Opposition Result	Rank
Olah Benedek	Men's singles	Bye	Bobocica (ITA); W w/o	Nuytinck (BEL); L 2–4	Did not advance				
Anna Kirichenko	Women's singles	Ho (GBR); L 0–4	Did not advance						

== Wrestling ==
Men's Freestyle

Athlete	Event	Round of 16	Quarterfinal	Semifinal	Repechage	Final / BM	
Athlete	Event	Opposition Result	Opposition Result	Opposition Result	Opposition Result	Opposition Result	Rank
Jere Heino	125 kg	Matcharashvili (GEO); L 0–10	Did not advance		Chintoan (ROU); L 1–5	Did not advance	

Men's Greco-Roman

Athlete	Event	Round of 16	Quarterfinal	Semifinal	Repechage	Final / BM	
Athlete	Event	Opposition Result	Opposition Result	Opposition Result	Opposition Result	Opposition Result	Rank
Elias Kuosmanen	97 kg	Cenk İldem (TUR); L 1–3	Did not advance				
Tuomas Lahti	130 kg	Marvik (NOR); L 1–2	Did not advance				
