= Jonathan Groth =

Danish table tennis player (born 1992)

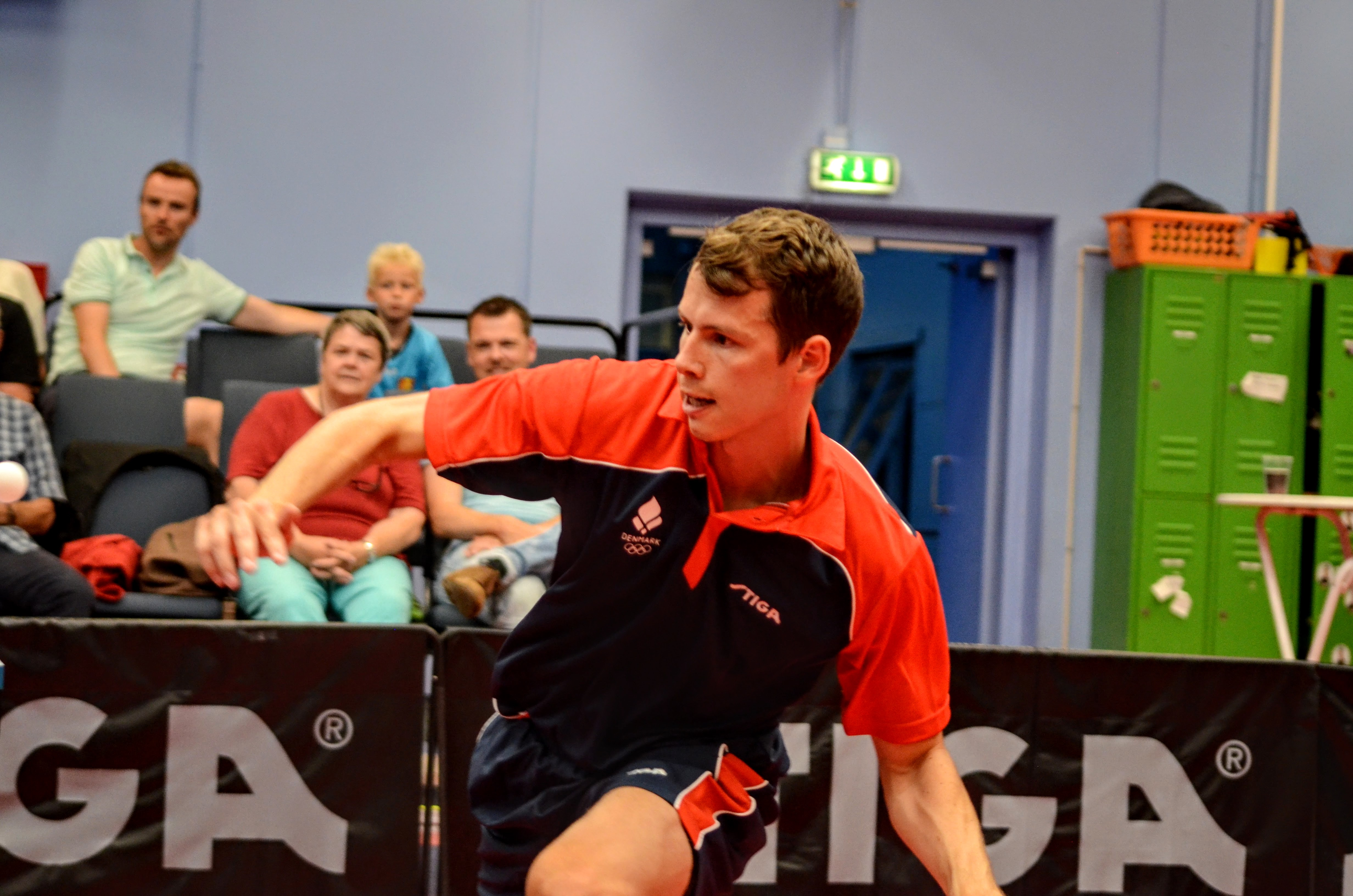

Personal information
- Full name: Jonathan Kjaer Groth
- Nationality: Denmark
- Born: 9 November 1992 (age 33)
- Height: 1.84 m (6 ft 0 in)

Sport
- Sport: Table tennis
- Playing style: Shakehand
- Highest ranking: 15 (November 2018)
- Current ranking: 46 (5 October 2026)
Medal record
Men's table tennis
Representing Denmark
European Games
Silver medal – second place	2019 Minsk	Singles
European Championships
Gold medal – first place	2016 Budapest	Doubles
Silver medal – second place	2010 Ostrava	Doubles
Bronze medal – third place	2018 Alicante	Doubles
Bronze medal – third place	2021 Cluj-Napoca	Team
Europe Top-16
Bronze medal – third place	2018 Montreux	Singles

Jonathan Kjaer Groth (born 9 November 1992) is a Danish table tennis player. He is the runner-up in men's singles at the 2019 European Games and won the doubles title at the 2016 European Championships.
