= Ieva Pope =

Latvian badminton player (born 1994)

Personal information
- Born: 8 January 1994 (age 32) Riga, Latvia
- Height: 1.76 m (5 ft 9 in)
- Weight: 68 kg (150 lb)

Sport
- Country: Latvia
- Sport: Badminton

Women's singles & doubles
- Highest ranking: 167 (WS 17 December 2015); 100 (WD 15 September 2011)
- BWF profile

Ieva Pope (born 8 January 1994) is a Latvian badminton player. She competed at the 2015 and 2019 European Games.

== Achievements ==
=== BWF International Challenge/Series ===
Women's doubles
Year	Tournament	Partner	Opponent	Score	Result
2015	Morocco International	(Latvia) Kristīne Šefere	(Jordan) Domou Amro (Jordan) Mazahreh Leina Fehmi	23–21, 21–13	(gold) Winner

BWF International Challenge tournament
BWF International Series tournament
BWF Future Series tournament
