= Chris Langridge =

British badminton player (born 1985)

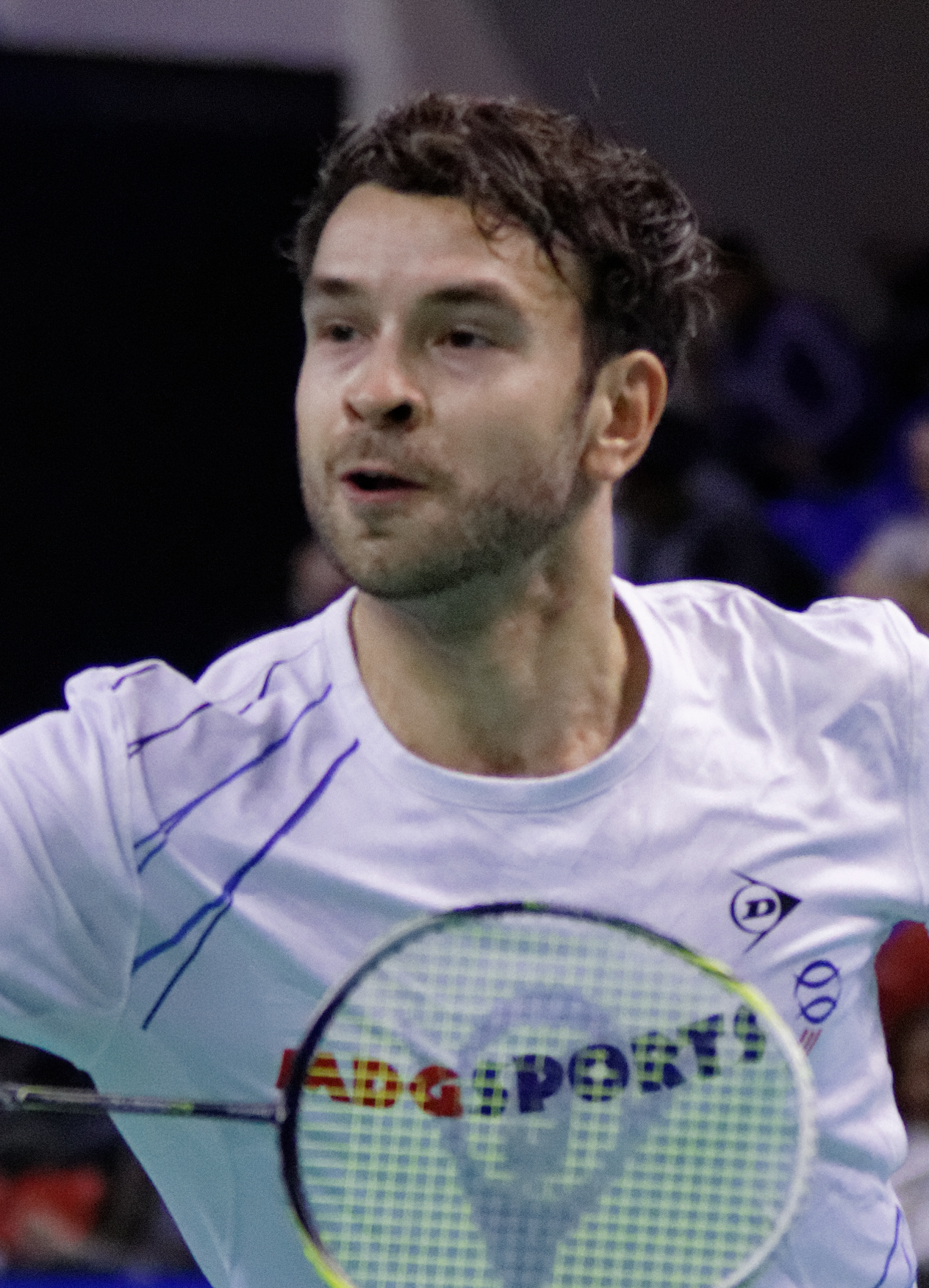
- Langridge at the 2013 French Super Series

Personal information
- Born: Christopher Phillip Langridge; 2 May 1985 (age 41) Epsom, Surrey, England
- Height: 1.76 m (5 ft 9 in)
- Weight: 73 kg (161 lb)

Sport
- Country: England
- Sport: Badminton
- Handedness: Right
- Coached by: Peter Jeffrey

Men's and mixed doubles
- Highest ranking: 11 (MD with Marcus Ellis 4 May 2021); 15 (XD with Heather Olver 13 March 2014)
- BWF profile
Medal record
Men's badminton
Representing Great Britain
Olympic Games
Bronze medal – third place	2016 Rio de Janeiro	Men's doubles
European Games
Gold medal – first place	2019 Minsk	Men's doubles
Representing England
Commonwealth Games
Gold medal – first place	2018 Gold Coast	Men's doubles
Silver medal – second place	2014 Glasgow	Mixed doubles
Silver medal – second place	2014 Glasgow	Mixed team
Bronze medal – third place	2014 Glasgow	Men's doubles
Bronze medal – third place	2018 Gold Coast	Mixed team
European Championships
Bronze medal – third place	2016 La Roche-sur-Yon	Men's doubles
Bronze medal – third place	2021 Kyiv	Men's doubles
European Mixed Team Championships
Silver medal – second place	2015 Leuven	Mixed team
Bronze medal – third place	2013 Moscow	Mixed team
Bronze medal – third place	2017 Lubin	Mixed team
European Men's Team Championships
Silver medal – second place	2014 Basel	Men's team
Silver medal – second place	2018 Kazan	Men's team
Bronze medal – third place	2012 Amsterdam	Men's team
Bronze medal – third place	2016 Kazan	Men's team

Christopher Phillip Langridge (born 2 May 1985) is a retired British badminton player. He competed for England at the 2014 Commonwealth Games where he won three medals. He represented Great Britain at the 2016 Summer Olympics, and won a bronze medal in the men's doubles, partnered with Marcus Ellis. They also won gold medals at the 2018 Commonwealth Games and 2019 European Games.

== Early life and education ==
Chris Langridge was born on 2 May 1985 in Epsom, Surrey.

Langridge was educated at Therfield School, a state comprehensive school in the town of Leatherhead in Surrey in southern England. The school were twice National Schools champions. Langridge was introduced to badminton when he was ten by his teacher Jackie Cunningham who was a badminton coach of the county, and within 18 months at the age of twelve he made the England team. He also played tennis for the South East region, and he was a football player as well as a 100-metre and 200-metre runner.

== Career ==
Langridge teamed up with a number of players in the doubles, for example with Peter Mills in the men's doubles, and starting in 2012 with Heather Olver in the mixed doubles. Langridge won three medals at the 2014 Commonwealth Games – a silver in the mixed doubles with Olver, a bronze in the men's doubles with Mills, as well as a silver in the mixed team match. By 2013, he has won three gold medals at the English National Badminton Championships in the men's doubles (with Nathan Robertson in 2011 and Mills 2013) and mixed doubles (with Olver in 2013).

In September 2014, he teamed up with Marcus Ellis. They won the men's doubles title in the English National Badminton Championships in both 2015 and 2016. They won a bronze in the 2016 European Championships in La Roche-sur-Yon. They have also won medals in the European Team Championships with a silver in the Mixed Team in 2015, and a bronze medal in the Men's Team in 2016.

At the 2016 Summer Olympics in Rio, despite ranking only No. 22 in the world, Ellis and Langridge managed to win a bronze, the first Olympic medal in badminton men's doubles won by a British team.

At the 2018 Commonwealth Games held on the Gold Coast, Australia, Langridge won a gold in the men's doubles with Marcus Ellis, which is England's first men's badminton double title at the Games in 40 years. He also won a bronze in the mixed team event.

Langridge qualified to represent Great Britain at the 2019 European Games, played in the men's doubles with Marcus Ellis. Competed as the second seed, they managed to claim the gold medal after beat the top seed from Denmark Kim Astrup and Anders Skaarup Rasmussen in straight games 21–17, 21–10.

In October 2020, Langridge and Marcus Ellis won the men's doubles title at the 2020 Denmark Open, became the first English men's doubles pair in 45 years to win the Denmark Open.

Langridge competed at the 2021 European Championships in Kyiv, Ukraine, and won a bronze in the men's doubles with Ellis.

After his deselection from the 2020 Olympics, Langridge retired from international competition. He later became a coach for the French Badminton Team, in 2022.

== Personal life ==
Langridge is married to Emma Page.

== Achievements ==
=== Olympic Games ===
Men's doubles
Year	Venue	Partner	Opponent	Score	Result
2016	Riocentro - Pavilion 4, Rio de Janeiro, Brazil	(United Kingdom) Marcus Ellis	(China) Chai Biao (China) Hong Wei	21–18, 19–21, 21–10	Bronze

=== Commonwealth Games ===
Men's doubles
Year	Venue	Partner	Opponent	Score	Result
2014	Emirates Arena, Glasgow, Scotland	(England) Peter Mills	(England) Chris Adcock (England) Andrew Ellis	21–17, 21–17	Bronze
2018	Carrara Sports and Leisure Centre, Gold Coast, Australia	(England) Marcus Ellis	(India) Satwiksairaj Rankireddy (India) Chirag Shetty	21–13, 21–16	Gold

Mixed doubles
Year	Venue	Partner	Opponent	Score	Result
2014	Emirates Arena, Glasgow, Scotland	(England) Heather Olver	(England) Chris Adcock (England) Gabby Adcock	9–21, 12–21	Silver

=== European Games ===
Men's doubles
Year	Venue	Partner	Opponent	Score	Result
2019	Falcon Club, Minsk, Belarus	(United Kingdom) Marcus Ellis	(Denmark) Kim Astrup (Denmark) Anders Skaarup Rasmussen	21–17, 21–10	Gold

=== European Championships ===
Men's doubles
Year	Venue	Partner	Opponent	Score	Result
2016	Vendéspace, La Roche-sur-Yon, France	(England) Marcus Ellis	(Denmark) Mads Conrad-Petersen (Denmark) Mads Pieler Kolding	19–21, 14–21	Bronze
2021	Palace of Sports, Kyiv, Ukraine	(England) Marcus Ellis	(Russia) Vladimir Ivanov (Russia) Ivan Sozonov	15–21, 10–21	Bronze

=== BWF World Tour (4 titles) ===
The BWF World Tour, which was announced on 19 March 2017 and implemented in 2018, is a series of elite badminton tournaments sanctioned by the Badminton World Federation (BWF). The BWF World Tour is divided into levels of World Tour Finals, Super 1000, Super 750, Super 500, Super 300 (part of the HSBC World Tour), and the BWF Tour Super 100.

Men's doubles
Year	Tournament	Level	Partner	Opponent	Score	Result
2018	Canada Open	Super 100	(England) Marcus Ellis	(Germany) Mark Lamsfuß (Germany) Marvin Seidel	19–21, 21–18, 22–20	(gold) Winner
2018	SaarLorLux Open	Super 100	(England) Marcus Ellis	(Malaysia) Aaron Chia (Malaysia) Soh Wooi Yik	21–23, 21–18, 21–19	(gold) Winner
2018	Scottish Open	Super 100	(England) Marcus Ellis	(Denmark) David Daugaard (Denmark) Frederik Søgaard	23–21, 21–16	(gold) Winner
2020	Denmark Open	Super 750	(England) Marcus Ellis	(Russia) Vladimir Ivanov (Russia) Ivan Sozonov	20–22, 21–17, 21–18	(gold) Winner

=== BWF Grand Prix (3 runners-up) ===
The BWF Grand Prix had two levels, the BWF Grand Prix and Grand Prix Gold. It was a series of badminton tournaments sanctioned by the Badminton World Federation (BWF) which was held from 2007 to 2017.

Men's doubles
Year	Tournament	Partner	Opponent	Score	Result
2012	Bitburger Open	(England) Peter Mills	(Germany) Ingo Kindervater (Germany) Johannes Schoettler	15–21, 11–21	(silver) Runner-up

Mixed doubles
Year	Tournament	Partner	Opponent	Score	Result
2013	London Grand Prix Gold	(England) Heather Olver	(Germany) Michael Fuchs (Germany) Birgit Michels	19–21, 14–21	(silver) Runner-up
2013	Scottish Open	(England) Heather Olver	(Scotland) Robert Blair (Scotland) Imogen Bankier	16–21, 14–21	(silver) Runner-up

BWF Grand Prix Gold tournament
BWF Grand Prix tournament

=== BWF International Challenge/Series (17 titles, 11 runners-up) ===
Men's doubles
Year	Tournament	Partner	Opponent	Score	Result
2005	Czech International	(England) Chris Tonks	(Denmark) Anders Kristiansen (Denmark) Simon Mollyhus	15–6, 15–11	(gold) Winner
2006	Croatian International	(England) Chris Tonks	(England) Ian Palethorpe (England) Kristian Roebuck	23–21, 15–21, 22–20	(gold) Winner
2006	Slovak International	(England) David Lindley	(England) Dean George (England) Chris Tonks	21–12, 21–11	(gold) Winner
2008	Scotland International	(England) David Lindley	(England) Richard Eidestedt (England) Andrew Ellis	19–21, 21–16, 16–21	(silver) Runner-up
2009	Swedish International	(England) David Lindley	(Japan) Naoki Kawamae (Japan) Shoji Sato	21–15, 14–21, 17–21	(silver) Runner-up
2009	Spanish Open	(England) Dean George	(Denmark) Rasmus Bonde (Denmark) Mikkel Delbo Larsen	24–26, 21–23	(silver) Runner-up
2009	Le Volant d'Or de Toulouse	(England) Robin Middleton	(Denmark) Rasmus Bonde (Denmark) Mikkel Delbo Larsen	21–11, 21–19	(gold) Winner
2009	Scotland International	(England) Robin Middleton	(Denmark) Mads Conrad-Petersen (Denmark) Mads Pieler Kolding	21–19, 24–26, 11–21	(silver) Runner-up
2010	Swedish International	(England) Robin Middleton	(Denmark) Mikkel Elbjorn (Denmark) Christian John Skovgaard	21–11, 21–18	(gold) Winner
2010	Czech International	(England) Robin Middleton	(England) Marcus Ellis (England) Peter Mills	21–9, 21–19	(gold) Winner
2010	Irish International	(England) Anthony Clark	(England) Chris Adcock (England) Andrew Ellis	13–21, 16–21	(silver) Runner-up
2010	Italian International	(England) Anthony Clark	(Russia) Vladimir Ivanov (Russia) Ivan Sozonov	21–14, 21–19	(gold) Winner
2011	Austrian International	(England) Anthony Clark	(Japan) Hiroyuki Saeki (Japan) Ryota Taohata	21–15, 21–16	(gold) Winner
2012	Czech International	(England) Peter Mills	(England) Peter Briggs (England) Harley Towler	21–14, 21–16	(gold) Winner
2013	Belgian International	(England) Peter Mills	(Denmark) Kim Astrup (Denmark) Anders Skaarup Rasmussen	18–21, 21–9, 15–21	(silver) Runner-up
2014	Italian International	(England) Marcus Ellis	(Germany) Michael Fuchs (Germany) Johannes Schoettler	21–11, 21–19	(gold) Winner
2015	White Nights	(England) Marcus Ellis	(Malaysia) Koo Kien Keat (Malaysia) Tan Boon Heong	10–21, 12–21	(silver) Runner-up
2015	Welsh International	(England) Marcus Ellis	(Poland) Adam Cwalina (Poland) Przemysław Wacha	21–16, 16–21, 21–16	(gold) Winner
2016	Austrian Open	(England) Marcus Ellis	(Japan) Kenya Mitsuhashi (Japan) Yuta Watanabe	21–14, 21–16	(gold) Winner
2017	Yonex / K&D Graphics International	(England) Marcus Ellis	(Chinese Taipei) Lu Chia-hung (Chinese Taipei) Lu Chia-pin	21–14, 21–17	(gold) Winner
2019	Azerbaijan International	(England) Marcus Ellis	(Germany) Mark Lamsfuß (Germany) Marvin Seidel	17–21, 21–23	(silver) Runner-up
2019	Kharkiv International	(England) Marcus Ellis	(England) Ben Lane (England) Sean Vendy	19–21, 18–21	(silver) Runner-up

Mixed doubles
Year	Tournament	Partner	Opponent	Score	Result
2006	Croatian International	(England) Jenny Day	(England) Kristian Roebuck (England) Jenny Wallwork	21–18, 24–22	(gold) Winner
2007	Belgian International	(England) Joanne Nicholas	(Germany) Ingo Kindervater (Germany) Kathrin Piotrowski	21–17, 15–21, 25–23	(gold) Winner
2012	Belgian International	(England) Heather Olver	(England) Marcus Ellis (England) Gabrielle White	21–9, 10–21, 17–21	(silver) Runner-up
2012	Czech International	(England) Heather Olver	(England) Marcus Ellis (England) Gabrielle White	22–20, 6–7 retired	(gold) Winner
2012	Welsh International	(England) Heather Olver	(England) Marcus Ellis (England) Gabrielle White	22–20, 16–21	(silver) Runner-up
2013	Welsh International	(England) Heather Olver	(Russia) Vitalij Durkin (Russia) Nina Vislova	21–17, 10–21, 21–13	(gold) Winner

BWF International Challenge tournament
BWF International Series tournament
BWF Future Series tournament
