= Hungary at the 2019 European Games =

- IOC code: HUN
- NOC: Hungarian Olympic Committee
- Website: www.olimpia.hu

in Minsk, Belarus 21 – 30 June 2019
- Competitors: 126 in 12 sports
- Flag bearer: Miklos Ungvari (judo)
- Medals Ranked 13th: Gold 4 Silver 6 Bronze 9 Total 19

European Games appearances (overview)
- 2015; 2019; 2023; 2027

Hungary competed at the 2019 European Games, in Minsk, Belarus from 21 to 30 June 2019. Hungary has previously competed at the 2015 European Games in Baku, Azerbaijan, where it won 20 medals, including eight golds.

== Archery ==
Recurve

Athlete	Event	Ranking round		Round of 64	Round of 32	Round of 16	Quarterfinals	Semifinals	Final / BM	
Athlete	Event	Score	Seed	Opposition Score	Opposition Score	Opposition Score	Opposition Score	Opposition Score	Opposition Score	Rank
Árpád Banda	Men's individual	647	26	Banchev (BUL); W 6–2	Alvariño (ESP); W 7–3	Wijler (NED); L 5–6	Did not advance			

== Badminton ==
Athletes	Event	Group stage				Round of 16	Quarterfinals	Semifinals	Final	Rank
Athletes	Event	Opposition Score	Opposition Score	Opposition Score	Rank	Opposition Score	Opposition Score	Opposition Score	Opposition Score	Rank
Gergely Krausz	Men's singles	Roovers (GER); W 2–0	Lale (TUR); L 1–2	Axelsen (DEN); Walkover	2 Q	Zilberman (ISR); L 0–2	Did not advance			
Agnes Korosi	Women's singles	Li (GER); L 0–2	Mikkelä (FIN); L 0–2	Darragh (IRL); W 2–0	3	Did not advance				
Nikoletta Bukoviczki; Daniella Gonda	Women's doubles	Fruergaard / Thygesen (DEN); L 0–2	Birch / Smith (GBR); L 0–2	Fomkinaitė / Voitechovskaja (LTU); L 1–2	3	—N/a	Did not advance			

== Basketball 3x3 ==
Team	Event	Group stage				Quarterfinals	Semifinals	Final / BM	
Team	Event	Opposition Score	Opposition Score	Opposition Score	Rank	Opposition Score	Opposition Score	Opposition Score	Rank
Sára Benke; Vivien Böröndy; Zsófia Jáhni	Women's tournament	Germany; L 9–19	Czech Republic; L 19–20	Romania; L 18–20	4	Did not advance			
