= Slovenia at the 2019 European Games =

- IOC code: SLO
- NOC: Olympic Committee of Slovenia
- Website: www.olympic.si

in Minsk, Belarus 21 – 30 June 2019
- Competitors: 72 in 12 sports
- Medals Ranked 14th: Gold 4 Silver 1 Bronze 1 Total 6

European Games appearances (overview)
- 2015; 2019; 2023; 2027

Slovenia competed at the 2019 European Games, in Minsk, Belarus from 21 to 30 June 2019. Slovenia has previously competed at the 2015 European Games in Baku, Azerbaijan, where it won 5 medals, including one gold.

== Archery ==
Recurve

Athlete	Event	Ranking round		Round of 64	Round of 32	Round of 16	Quarterfinals	Semifinals	Final / BM	
Athlete	Event	Score	Seed	Opposition Score	Opposition Score	Opposition Score	Opposition Score	Opposition Score	Opposition Score	Rank
Rok Bizjak	Men's individual	648	25	Sierakowski (POL)						
Ana Umer	Women's individual	589	42	Kuoppa (FIN)						
Rok Bizjak; Ana Umer	Mixed team	1237	20	—	Austria; L 4–5	Did not advance				17

Compound

Athlete	Event	Ranking round		Round of 16	Quarterfinals	Semifinals	Final / BM	
Athlete	Event	Score	Seed	Opposition Score	Opposition Score	Opposition Score	Opposition Score	Rank
Toja Ellison	Women's individual	702 GR	1	Mamalias (ISL); W 144–131	Paas (EST)			

== Badminton ==
Athletes	Event	Group stage				Round of 16	Quarterfinals	Semifinals	Final	Rank
Athletes	Event	Opposition Score	Opposition Score	Opposition Score	Rank	Opposition Score	Opposition Score	Opposition Score	Opposition Score	Rank
Miha Ivanič	Men's singles	Zilberman (ISR)	Maddaloni (ITA)	Heino (FIN)						
Lia Šalehar	Women's singles	Birch (GBR)	Jaquet (SUI)	Gonçalves (POR)						
