= Portugal at the 2019 European Games =

- IOC code: POR
- NOC: Olympic Committee of Portugal
- Website: www.comiteolimpicoportugal.pt

in Minsk, Belarus 21 – 30 June 2019
- Competitors: 99 in 11 sports
- Flag bearer: Marcos Freitas (table tennis)
- Medals Ranked 17th: Gold 3 Silver 6 Bronze 6 Total 15

European Games appearances (overview)
- 2015; 2019; 2023; 2027

Portugal competed at the 2019 European Games, in Minsk, Belarus from 21 to 30 June 2019. Portugal has previously competed at the 2015 European Games in Baku, Azerbaijan, where it won 10 medals, including three golds.

== Archery ==
Compound

| Athlete | Event | Ranking round | | Round of 16 | Quarterfinals | Semifinals | Final / BM | |
| Athlete | Event | Score | Seed | Opposition Score | Opposition Score | Opposition Score | Opposition Score | Rank |
|---|---|---|---|---|---|---|---|---|
| Rui Baptista | Men's individual | 678 | 16 | Nedeljković (SRB) | | | | |

== Badminton ==
| Athletes | Event | Group stage | | | | Round of 16 | Quarterfinals | Semifinals | Final | Rank |
| Athletes | Event | Opposition Score | Opposition Score | Opposition Score | Rank | Opposition Score | Opposition Score | Opposition Score | Opposition Score | Rank |
|---|---|---|---|---|---|---|---|---|---|---|
| Bernaro Atilano | Men's singles | Caljouw (NED) | Rogalski (POL) | Savin (MDA) | | | | | | |
| Sonia Gonçalves | Women's singles | Birch (GBR) | Jaquet (SUI) | Salehar (SLO) | | | | | | |
