= 2019 World Archery Championships – Women's team recurve =

The women's team recurve competition at the 2019 World Archery Championships took place from 10 to 16 June in 's-Hertogenbosch, Netherlands.

43 countries entered the full quota of 3 archers into the qualification round, thus becoming eligible for the team competition. The combined totals of the 3 archers from each country in the qualification round were added together, and the 24 teams with the highest combined scores competed in the elimination rounds.

Countries reaching the quarterfinals earned a team qualification spot (and corresponding 3 individual qualifying spots) for the 2020 Summer Olympics.

== Schedule ==
All times are UTC+01:00.

Date	Time	Phase
10 June	10:00	Qualification
11 June	10:00	1/12 eliminations
12 June	16:30	1/8 eliminations
13 June	10:00	QF and SF
16 June	10:00	Medal matches

== Qualification round ==
Qualified for eliminations

Rank	Nation	Name	Score
1	South Korea	Choi Mi-sun; Kang Chae-young; Chang Hye-jin	2041
2	China	An Qixuan; Meng Fanxu; Zheng Yichai	2035
3	Chinese Taipei	Lei Chien-ying; Tan Ya-ting; Peng Chia-mao	1998
4	Germany	Elena Richter; Lisa Unruh; Michelle Kroppen	1988
5	United Kingdom	Naomi Folkard; Sarah Bettles; Bryony Pitman	1979
6	India	Komalika Bari; Deepika Kumari; Bombayla Devi Laishram	1975
7	Ukraine	Veronika Marchenko; Anastasia Pavlova; Lidiia Sichenikova	1973
8	Japan	Chinatsu Kubara; Waka Sonoda; Tomomi Sugimoto	1964
9	Russia	Elena Osipova; Ksenia Perova; Inna Stepanova	1963
10	United States	Casey Kaufhold; Khatuna Lorig; Erin Mickelberry	1959
11	Belarus	Hanna Marusava; Karyna Kazlouskaya; Karyna Dziominskaya	1958
12	Italy	Tatiana Andreoli; Lucilla Boari; Vanessa Landi	1957
13	Mexico	Mariana Avitia; Aída Román; Alejandra Valencia	1956
14	France	Audrey Adiceom; Lisa Barbelin; Melanie Gaubil	1956
15	Turkey	Aybuke Aktuna; Yasemin Anagöz; Gulnaz Coskun	1935
16	Vietnam	Đỗ Thị Ánh Nguyệt; Loc Thi Dao; Nguyen Thi Phuong	1929
17	Spain	Elia Canales; Alicia Marín; Monica Galisteo	1924
18	Estonia	Triinu Lilienthal; Laura Nurmsalu; Reena Pärnat	1913
19	Denmark	Randi Degn; Maja Jager; Anne Marie Laursen	1908
20	Iran	Niloofar Alipoor; Shiva Shojamehr; Zahra Nemati	1901
21	Mongolia	Altangerel Enkhtuya; Ganbold Uyanga; Bishindee Urantungalag	1898
22	Poland	Karolina Farasiewicz; Natalia Leśniak; Sylwia Zyzańska	1896
23	Sweden	Christine Bjerendal; Erika Jangnäs; Elin Kättström	1887
24	Thailand	Inkham Nattapat; Khunhiranchaiyo Narisara; Phutdee Waraporn	1877
25	Colombia	Ana Rendón; Valentina Acosta; Maira Sepúlveda	1874
26	Malaysia	Nur Afisa Abdul Halil; Nur Aliya Ghapar; Shin Hui Loke	1871
27	Brazil	Ana Machado; Ane Marcelle dos Santos; Graziela Paulino Dos Santos	1860
28	Kazakhstan	Karakoz Askarova; Gaukhar Igibayeva; Alina Ilyassova	1856
29	Australia	Deonne Bridger; Sarah Haywood; Belinda Maxworthy	1848
30	Indonesia	Diananda Choirunisa; Linda Lestari; Titik Kusuma Wardani	1844
31	Philippines	Pia Elizabeth Angela Bidaure; Nicole Marie Tagle; Kahreel Meer Hongitan	1837
32	Netherlands	Gabriela Bayardo; Sarina Laan; Sietske Visser	1836
33	Georgia	Ira Arjevanidze; Tsiko Phutkaradze; Khatuna Narimanidze	1835
34	Azerbaijan	Ozay Gasimova; Yaylagul Ramazanova; Svetlana Simonova	1829
35	Austria	Nina Riess; Elisabeth Straka; Martina Woell	1829
36	Uzbekistan	Ziyodakhon Abdusattorova; Munira Nurmanova; Anastasiya Soldatenko	1821
37	Hong Kong	Cheng Ching Yi; Lam Shuk Ching Ada; Wu Sze Yan	1807
38	Cyprus	Anna Kallenou; Mikaella Kourouna; Elena Mousikou	1799
39	Finland	Gajane Bottinelli; Taru Kuoppa; Iida Tukiainen	1764
40	New Zealand	Sarah Fuller; Olivia Hodgson; Olivia Sloan	1764
41	Lithuania	Kristina Abramaityte; Paulina Ramanauskaitė; Inga Timinskiene	1759
42	Norway	Laila Fevang Marzouk; Line Blomen Ridderstrom; Katrine Hillestad	1758
43	Ireland	Ciara Dunne; Sarah Moloney; Roisin Mooney	1723

== Elimination round ==
1st round
1	South Korea
Bye
17	Spain	0	2	2	2
16	Vietnam	2	0	0	0
9	Russia	2	2	2
24	Thailand	0	0	0
Bye
8	Japan
5	United Kingdom
Bye
21	Mongolia	0	0	0
12	Italy	2	2	2
13	Mexico	0	2	2	2
20	Iran	2	0	0	0
Bye
4	Germany
3	Chinese Taipei
Bye
19	Denmark	0	2	1	0
14	France	2	0	1	2
11	Belarus	2	1	2
22	Poland	0	1	0
Bye
6	India
7	Ukraine
Bye
23	Sweden	2	2	1
10	United States	0	0	1
15	Turkey	2	0	2	2
18	Estonia	0	2	0	0
Bye
2	China

2nd round
1	South Korea	2	2	2
17	Spain	0	0	0
9	Russia	2	2	2
8	Japan	0	0	0
5	United Kingdom	2	0	2	2
12	Italy	0	2	0	0
13	Mexico	0	2	0	0
4	(Germany)	2	0	2	2
3	Chinese Taipei	2	2	2
14	France	0	0	0
11	Belarus	2	0	2	2
6	India	0	2	0	0
7	Ukraine	1	0	2	2
23	Sweden	1	2	0	0
15	Turkey	0	0	0
2	China	2	2	2

Quarterfinals
1	South Korea	0	2	1	2
9	Russia	2	0	1	0
5	United Kingdom	2	0	2	2
4	Germany	0	2	0	0
3	Chinese Taipei	2	2	2
11	Belarus	0	0	0
7	Ukraine	2	2	0	0	0
2	China	0	0	2	2	1

Semifinals
1	South Korea	2	2	1
5	United Kingdom	0	0	1
3	Chinese Taipei	1	2	2
2	China	1	0	0

Finals
1	South Korea	0	0	2	0
3	Chinese Taipei	2	2	0	2
Third place
5	United Kingdom	2	2	0	0	1
2	China	0	0	2	2	0
