= Archery at the 2019 European Games – Women's individual recurve =

Women's individual recurve at the 2019 European Games
- Venue: Olympic Sports Complex
- Date: 21–26 June
- Competitors: 48 from 32 nations

Medalists
| gold medal | Tatiana Andreoli | Italy |
| silver medal | Lucilla Boari | Italy |
| bronze medal | Gabriela Bayardo | Netherlands |

The women's individual recurve competition at the 2019 European Games was held from 21 to 26 June 2019 at the Olympic Sports Complex in Minsk, Belarus. It was the second time the event was held as part of the European Games archery programme. A total of 48 archers from 32 different nations entered the competition, with a maximum of three entries per country. The event offered one qualifying spot for the women's individual event at the 2020 Summer Olympics for any archer reaching the semi-finals from a nation that had not already qualified. The defending champion, Karina Winter of Germany, did not take part following her retirement from the sport.

Gabriela Bayardo of the Netherlands set a new Games record in the ranking round for a total number of points scored from 72 arrows. Tatiana Andreoli defeated Lucilla Boari in an all-Italian final, securing their nation's third and fourth archery medals of the 2019 European Games. Bayardo defeated Russia's Anna Balsukova to win the bronze medal and secure the available qualification for the Olympics the following year, the first for a Dutch female archer since 1996.

== Background ==
=== Qualification ===
A total of 48 places were available for the event. As the host nation, Belarus received automatic qualification of three of its archers. Qualification for the remaining positions took place principally through the European Outdoor Archery Championship held in Legnica, Poland in August and September 2018, and the European Grand Prix event held in April 2019. Five 'Universality' places were additionally determined by the European Olympic Committee and World Archery Europe to add representation from National Olympic Committees that otherwise would have not qualified.

== Format ==
An official World Archery target consists of ten evenly-spaced concentric rings. An arrow landing in the outermost ring scores one point; striking the centre yellow circle earns the maximum ten points.

The event was an outdoor target archery event using recurve bows. Held under the World Archery-approved rules, archers shot at a 122 cm-wide target from a distance of 70 metres, each arrow being awarded between one and ten points depending on how close it landed to the centre of the target. The competition consisted of three stages: an initial ranking round, five elimination rounds, and two finals matches deciding the medal placings. In the ranking round, each of the 48 archers entering the competition shot a total of 72 arrows. The total score of each archer was used to seed the archers into the following five-round single-elimination tournament, with the highest-scoring archer receiving the number one seed. If two or more archers finished with the same total score, the number of arrows shot in the central 10-ring on the target was used as a tie-breaker. If two or more archers were still tied, then the number of arrows shot within the inner-10 ring determined the finishing positions.

The elimination rounds used the Archery Olympic Round set system used in international recurve archery events since 2010. Each match consisted of a maximum of five sets, with archers each shooting three arrows per set, alternating one arrow at a time. The archer with the best score from their three arrows won the set, earning two points. The archer with the lowest score in each set received zero points. If the score was tied, each archer received one point. The first archer to six points was declared the winner. If the match was tied 5-5 after the maximum 5 sets were played, a single tie-breaker arrow was used with the closest to centre of the target winning.

=== Schedule ===
| Day | Date | Time | Competition stage |
|---|---|---|---|
| 1 | Friday, 21 June 2019 | 13:15-16:00 | Ranking round |
| 5 | Tuesday, 25 June 2019 | 09:00-17:00 | 1/32 elimination round 1/16 elimination round |
| 6 | Wednesday, 26 June 2019 | 09:00-11:00 | 1/8 elimination round |
| 6 | Wednesday, 26 June 2019 | 11:00-12:00 | Quarter-finals |
| 6 | Wednesday, 26 June 2019 | 12:00-12:30 | Semifinals |
| 6 | Wednesday, 26 June 2019 | 15:30-15:45 | Bronze medal match |
| 6 | Wednesday, 26 June 2019 | 15:45-16:00 | Gold medal match |
All times are Further-eastern European Time (UTC+3:00); Source:

== Report ==
=== Ranking and elimination rounds ===
Michelle Kroppen and Lisa Unruh of Germany, Ksenia Perova of Russia, and Yasemin Anagoz of Turkey entered as the highest ranked archers in the World Archery rankings, Kroppen holding the highest position at world number five.

The ranking round took place on the afternoon of 21 August, the opening day of the Games. Gabriela Bayardo topped the table with a new European Games record of 666 points, beating the previous record set by Unruh in 2015 by four points. The German trio of Kroppen, Unruh, and Elena Richter were forced to borrow bows from other competitors for the ranking round as their equipment had not arrived at the Olympic Sports Complex from the airport. Shooting with an unfamiliar bow is considered a disadvantage, and Unruh stated that they had one hour to learn the new bows before the competition commenced. As a result, the German Shooting and Archery Federation commented that the three entered the elimination rounds from a weaker starting position, with the 1/16 elimination round seeing both Unruh meeting top seed Bayardo and Kroppen and Richter facing off in an all-German tie. Bayardo and Kroppen both emerged victorious to advance to the 1/8 elimination round, Kroppen stating afterwards that "[i]t's always a stupid feeling when you have to compete against a teammate very early... [o]f course it annoys me to send a teammate out of the race. I think this match was one of the hardest".

The two medalists from the 2015 European Games contesting the event, Maja Jager of Denmark and Alicia Marín of Spain, each failed to progress far into the tournament. Jager, the silver medalist from 2015, was disappointed with her finish in the ranking round - her 20th place was described by Danish news agency Ritzau as a "modest" result - the Dane conceding afterwards that she struggled with the wind as well as her focus in the first half of the round. With 2015 bronze medalist Marín seeded 13th, Jager's win in the opening round meant the two met in the 1/16 elimination round, a repeat of their semi-final match in Baku four years previously. Jager again emerged victorious with Marín struggling to maintain her form from the ranking round. Jager was however eliminated in the following round by Inna Stepanova of Russia in a close match which saw the two tie scores in each of the five sets they played, Stepanova edging out Jager in the subsequent one-arrow shoot-off eight points to seven. With the elimination of Jager's teammates Anne Laursen and Randi Degn in the 1/32 round and the quarter-finals respectively, Denmark's participation in the event ended with them failing to add to their bronze medal victory in the women's team event.

The progression of Italians Tatiana Andreoli and Lucilla Boari to the gold medal final was considered a surprise by OA Sports after the pair had underperformed in the women's team recurve event as well as the 2019 World Archery Championships held earlier that month. Twelfth seed Andreoli shot strongly to defeat fifth seed Audrey Adiceom of France, fourth seed Stepanova, and top seed Bayardo in succession to reach the final, holding out in a double arrow shoot-off against the Frenchwoman and then recovering to come from behind to beat Stepanova in the quarter-finals. Boari meanwhile unexpectedly triumphed against Kroppen in the 1/8 elimination round before seeing off the third-seed Belarusian Karyna Kazlouskaya on her way to the semi-finals. The semi-final encounters, beginning at midday on 26 June, saw Andreoli capitalise on what OA Sports described as a "mediocre" display by Bayardo to win in four sets, while Boari delivered a comprehensive straight sets victory against Russia's Anna Balsukova to set up an all-Italian final.

=== Medal matches ===
As the two losing archers from the semi-finals, Bayardo and Balsukova met to contest the bronze medal match. Bayardo won the encounter in a convincing manner in four sets, admitting that she underperformed in the semi-final against Andreoli due to receiving the news that she successfully qualified a spot for the Netherlands at the 2020 Summer Olympics. It had been more than two decades since the last Dutch female participation at an Olympic archery event, when Lyudmila Arzhannikova and Christel Verstegen competed at the 1996 Summer Olympics in Atlanta. Following her bronze medal win Bayardo reflected that "I was really excited. I wanted to cry. I was really happy. It was just a mix of emotions... [t]he time was too short and I needed to shoot, and I couldn’t handle that.”

The gold medal final featuring Andreoli and Boari was the first all-Italian final played at such a high level in international archery. The pair both started the match strongly, Andreoli scoring two consecutive 10s to take the first set before Boari held her nerve to tie the second set at 28-28. Andreoli however showed greater consistency over the next two sets, and with Boari faltering by shooting three sevens in her final six arrows, Andreoli shot a pair of 26 scores to wrap up the match and take the gold medal.

The victory was Andreoli's first individual medal triumph at a senior competition, while Boari's silver was her second medal of the Games after winning gold with Mauro Nespoli in the mixed team recurve three days earlier. Erik Nicolaysen of OA Sports considered the gold and silver medal successes for the Italian pair as a partial redemption of their poor performances leading into the event. He also wrote that despite her loss, Boari's runner-up finish was an encouraging sign for future events. Boari nevertheless conceded that she had shot poorly, and Andreoli admitted that her personal target ahead of the competition had been to just reach the quarter-finals. She however attributed her victory to the accommodating conditions and her ability to find the right frame of mind, describing it as "the perfect day".

== Records ==
Prior to the competition, the existing world, European and Games records were as follows:

- 72 arrow ranking round

| | Athlete | Score | Location | Date | Ref |
|---|---|---|---|---|---|
| World record | Kang Chae-young (KOR) | 691 | Antalya, Turkey | 21 May 2018 | |
| Continental record | Natalia Valeeva (ITA) | 679 | Brussels, Belgium | 17 May 2004 | |
| Games record | Lisa Unruh (GER) | 662 | Baku, Azerbaijan | 16 June 2015 | |

The following new records were set:

| | Athlete | Score | Location | Date | Ref |
|---|---|---|---|---|---|
| Games record | Gabriela Bayardo (NED) | 666 | Minsk, Belarus | 21 June 2019 | |

== Results ==
=== Ranking round ===
Key

Advanced to 1/16 elimination round
Advanced to 1/32 elimination round

| Rank | Archer | Half | | Score | 10s | Xs |
| Rank | Archer | 1st | 2nd | Score | 10s | Xs |
|---|---|---|---|---|---|---|
| 1 | Gabriela Bayardo (NED) | 333 | 333 | 666 GR | 29 | 11 |
| 2 | Ksenia Perova (RUS) | 329 | 333 | 662 | 30 | 14 |
| 3 | Karyna Kazlouskaya (BLR) | 326 | 328 | 654 | 25 | 11 |
| 4 | Inna Stepanova (RUS) | 329 | 323 | 652 | 24 | 7 |
| 5 | Audrey Adiceom (FRA) | 326 | 325 | 651 | 23 | 7 |
| 6 | Lucilla Boari (ITA) | 323 | 327 | 650 | 26 | 2 |
| 7 | Anna Balsukova (RUS) | 314 | 335 | 649 | 28 | 10 |
| 8 | Karyna Dziominskaya (BLR) | 323 | 325 | 648 | 27 | 7 |
| 9 | Christine Bjerendal (SWE) | 322 | 324 | 646 | 23 | 7 |
| 10 | Yasemin Anagöz (TUR) | 322 | 323 | 645 | 22 | 10 |
| 11 | Michelle Kroppen (GER) | 322 | 323 | 645 | 20 | 3 |
| 12 | Tatiana Andreoli (ITA) | 320 | 325 | 645 | 19 | 11 |
| 13 | Alicia Marín (ESP) | 312 | 332 | 644 | 24 | 4 |
| 14 | Naomi Folkard (GBR) | 323 | 319 | 642 | 21 | 5 |
| 15 | Alexandra Mîrca (MDA) | 313 | 328 | 641 | 26 | 6 |
| 16 | Sarah Bettles (GBR) | 322 | 318 | 640 | 22 | 10 |
| 17 | Bryony Pitman (GBR) | 321 | 319 | 640 | 22 | 6 |
| 18 | Veronika Marchenko (UKR) | 315 | 320 | 635 | 19 | 2 |
| 19 | Vanessa Landi (ITA) | 308 | 323 | 631 | 26 | 9 |
| 20 | Maja Jager (DEN) | 311 | 319 | 630 | 16 | 4 |
| 21 | Hanna Marusava (BLR) | 312 | 316 | 628 | 16 | 4 |
| 22 | Elena Richter (GER) | 313 | 314 | 627 | 11 | 4 |
| 23 | Taru Kuoppa (FIN) | 317 | 309 | 626 | 20 | 8 |
| 24 | Anastasia Pavlova (UKR) | 311 | 314 | 625 | 13 | 2 |
| 25 | Aybüke Aktuna (TUR) | 315 | 309 | 624 | 14 | 3 |
| 26 | Sylwia Zyzańska (POL) | 316 | 307 | 623 | 16 | 8 |
| 27 | Laura Nurmsalu (EST) | 312 | 311 | 623 | 13 | 4 |
| 28 | Gülnaz Coşkun (TUR) | 303 | 315 | 618 | 17 | 3 |
| 29 | Maeve Reidy (IRL) | 316 | 302 | 618 | 15 | 5 |
| 30 | Tihana Kovačić (CRO) | 305 | 312 | 617 | 18 | 5 |
| 31 | Denisa Baránková (SVK) | 311 | 304 | 615 | 15 | 5 |
| 32 | Beatrice Mikloș (ROU) | 293 | 317 | 610 | 17 | 7 |
| 33 | Lisa Unruh (GER) | 295 | 315 | 610 | 11 | 5 |
| 34 | Randi Degn (DEN) | 306 | 303 | 609 | 16 | 4 |
| 35 | Evangelia Psarra (GRE) | 306 | 303 | 609 | 11 | 2 |
| 36 | Lidiia Sichenikova (UKR) | 308 | 298 | 606 | 13 | 4 |
| 37 | Anne Laursen (DEN) | 315 | 290 | 605 | 14 | 3 |
| 38 | Elisabeth Straka (AUT) | 309 | 294 | 603 | 15 | 7 |
| 39 | Tsiko Putkaradze (GEO) | 295 | 307 | 602 | 13 | 2 |
| 40 | Inga Timinskienė (LTU) | 281 | 313 | 594 | 11 | 3 |
| 41 | Charlotte Destrooper (BEL) | 298 | 292 | 590 | 9 | 2 |
| 42 | Ana Umer (SLO) | 304 | 285 | 589 | 15 | 2 |
| 43 | Ozay Gasımova (AZE) | 289 | 297 | 586 | 9 | 5 |
| 44 | Mikaella Kourouna (CYP) | 296 | 288 | 584 | 9 | 2 |
| 45 | Mina Šibalić (MNE) | 302 | 268 | 570 | 7 | 1 |
| 46 | Dobromira Danailova (BUL) | 277 | 290 | 567 | 8 | 0 |
| 47 | Iliana Deineko (SUI) | 272 | 272 | 544 | 7 | 0 |
| 48 | Ardita Zejnullahu (KOS) | 242 | 258 | 500 | 4 | 1 |

=== Elimination rounds ===
==== Section 1 ====
1/32 elimination
33 | Unruh (GER) | 6 | 27 | 26 | 26 | 28
32 | Mikloș (ROU) | 2 | 21 | 24 | 27 | 26
17 | Pitman (GBR) | 6 | 25 | 27 | 27
48 | Zejnullahu (KOS) | 0 | 6 | 19 | 25
41 | Destrooper (BEL) | 5 | 20 | 21 | 25 | 29 | 25
24 | Pavlova (UKR) | 6* | 24 | 29 | 25 | 26 | 24
25 | Aktuna (TUR) | 6* | 25 | 26 | 25 | 24 | 26
40 | Timinskienė (LTU) | 5 | 24 | 25 | 26 | 24 | 27

1/16 elimination
1 | Bayardo (NED) | 7 | 30 | 29 | 27 | 27
33 | Unruh (GER) | 1 | 28 | 26 | 27 | 25
17 | Pitman (GBR) | 4 | 28 | 28 | 26 | 28 | 24
16 | Bettles (GBR) | 6 | 27 | 25 | 29 | 30 | 26
9 | Bjerendal (SWE) | 0 | 26 | 23 | 23
24 | Pavlova (UKR) | 6 | 27 | 24 | 25
25 | Aktuna (TUR) | 4 | 27 | 24 | 25 | 26 | 25
8 | Dziominskaya (BLR) | 6 | 25 | 25 | 27 | 24 | 28

1/8 elimination
1 | Bayardo (NED) | 6 | 26 | 29 | 26 | 27
16 | Bettles (GBR) | 2 | 28 | 27 | 25 | 25
24 | Pavlova (UKR) | 0 | 22 | 25 | 26
8 | Dziominskaya (BLR) | 6 | 24 | 27 | 28

Quarterfinals
1 | Bayardo (NED) | 6* | 28 | 28 | 25 | 25 | 27
8 | Dziominskaya (BLR) | 5 | 27 | 28 | 27 | 25 | 27

==== Section 2 ====
1/32 elimination
37 | Laursen (DEN) | 2 | 24 | 24 | 26 | 25
28 | Coşkun (TUR) | 6 | 26 | 24 | 26 | 29
21 | Marusava (BLR) | 6 | 29 | 24 | 27 | 28
44 | Kourouna (CYP) | 2 | 23 | 25 | 21 | 21
45 | Šibalić (MNE) | 4 | 29 | 20 | 29 | 18 | 23
20 | Jager (DEN) | 6 | 26 | 27 | 25 | 26 | 27
29 | Reidy (IRL) | 6* | 26 | 26 | 27 | 27 | 26
36 | Sichenikova (UKR) | 5 | 28 | 25 | 26 | 27 | 27

1/16 elimination
5 | Adiceom (FRA) | 6 | 26 | 24 | 25 | 27 | 26
28 | Coşkun (TUR) | 4 | 24 | 27 | 26 | 24 | 24
21 | Marusava (BLR) | 5 | 28 | 25 | 25 | 28 | 29
12 | Andreoli (ITA) | 6* | 26 | 26 | 25 | 28 | 29
13 | Marín (ESP) | 4 | 25 | 28 | 26 | 27 | 17
20 | Jager (DEN) | 6 | 26 | 26 | 27 | 26 | 29
29 | Reidy (IRL) | 0 | 26 | 25 | 22
4 | Stepanova (RUS) | 6 | 29 | 27 | 27

1/8 elimination
5 | Adiceom (FRA) | 5 | 28 | 24 | 26 | 27 | 28
12 | Andreoli (ITA) | 6* | 28 | 23 | 28 | 28 | 27
20 | Jager (DEN) | 5 | 26 | 26 | 27 | 28 | 27
4 | Stepanova (RUS) | 6* | 26 | 26 | 27 | 28 | 27

Quarterfinals
12 | Andreoli (ITA) | 6 | 28 | 28 | 26 | 28 | 28
4 | Stepanova (RUS) | 4 | 26 | 29 | 27 | 25 | 27

==== Section 3 ====
1/32 elimination
35 | Psarra (GRE) | 4 | 24 | 23 | 23 | 28 | 26
30 | Kovačić (CRO) | 6 | 27 | 24 | 22 | 24 | 27
19 | Landi (ITA) | 7 | 23 | 24 | 25 | 27
46 | Danailova (BUL) | 1 | 15 | 24 | 24 | 24
43 | Gasımova (AZE) | 0 | 22 | 24 | 22
22 | Richter (GER) | 6 | 26 | 25 | 26
27 | Nurmsalu (EST) | 6 | 24 | 25 | 28 | 27 | 28
38 | Straka (AUT) | 4 | 27 | 26 | 26 | 26 | 22

1/16 elimination
3 | Kazlouskaya (BLR) | 6 | 26 | 24 | 27
30 | Kovačić (CRO) | 0 | 22 | 23 | 25
19 | Landi (ITA) | 3 | 24 | 27 | 27 | 24 | 25
14 | Folkard (GBR) | 7 | 27 | 26 | 27 | 26 | 26
11 | Kroppen (GER) | 6 | 28 | 28 | 27 | 29
22 | Richter (GER) | 2 | 30 | 26 | 26 | 27
27 | Nurmsalu (EST) | 2 | 26 | 29 | 24 | 25
6 | Boari (ITA) | 6 | 29 | 27 | 26 | 27

1/8 elimination
3 | Kazlouskaya (BLR) | 6 | 27 | 24 | 27 | 27
14 | Folkard (GBR) | 2 | 27 | 22 | 27 | 26
11 | Kroppen (GER) | 2 | 24 | 24 | 25 | 24
6 | Boari (ITA) | 6 | 21 | 28 | 27 | 26

Quarterfinals
3 | Kazlouskaya (BLR) | 2 | 25 | 28 | 24 | 23
6 | Boari (ITA) | 6 | 29 | 26 | 28 | 25

==== Section 4 ====
1/32 elimination
39 | Putkaradze (GEO) | 6 | 24 | 20 | 28 | 27 | 24
26 | Zyzańska (POL) | 4 | 23 | 24 | 22 | 30 | 22
23 | Kuoppa (FIN) | 6 | 30 | 25 | 29
42 | Umer (SLO) | 0 | 27 | 24 | 25
47 | Deineko (SUI) | 0 | 17 | 16 | 26
18 | Marchenko (UKR) | 6 | 22 | 26 | 27
31 | Baránková (SVK) | 2 | 25 | 22 | 26 | 29
34 | Degn (DEN) | 6 | 26 | 26 | 26 | 29

1/16 elimination
7 | Balsukova (RUS) | 6 | 26 | 27 | 28
39 | Putkaradze (GEO) | 0 | 25 | 24 | 22
23 | Kuoppa (FIN) | 6 | 26 | 29 | 29
10 | Anagöz (TUR) | 0 | 21 | 28 | 27
15 | Mîrca (MDA) | 2 | 25 | 24 | 28 | 27
18 | Marchenko (UKR) | 6 | 30 | 27 | 27 | 28
34 | Degn (DEN) | 6* | 28 | 25 | 27 | 28 | 26
2 | Perova (RUS) | 5 | 27 | 27 | 28 | 27 | 26

1/8 elimination
7 | Balsukova (RUS) | 6 | 28 | 29 | 25
23 | Kuoppa (FIN) | 0 | 27 | 24 | 23
18 | Marchenko (UKR) | 4 | 27 | 25 | 25 | 27 | 27
34 | Degn (DEN) | 6 | 26 | 29 | 22 | 28 | 28

Quarterfinals
7 | Balsukova (RUS) | 7 | 27 | 28 | 27 | 26
34 | Degn (DEN) | 1 | 27 | 27 | 24 | 19

Note: An asterisk (*) denotes a win from a one-arrow shoot-off

=== Finals ===
Semifinals
1 | Gabriela Bayardo (NED) | 2 | 25 | 24 | 26 | 25
12 | Tatiana Andreoli (ITA) | 6 | 28 | 25 | 24 | 28
6 | Lucilla Boari (ITA) | 6 | 27 | 27 | 26
7 | Anna Balsukova (RUS) | 0 | 25 | 24 | 25

Gold medal match
12 | Tatiana Andreoli (ITA) (gold) | 7 | 28 | 28 | 26 | 26
6 | Lucilla Boari (ITA) (silver) | 1 | 25 | 28 | 22 | 25
Bronze medal match
1 | Gabriela Bayardo (NED) (bronze) | 7 | 30 | 28 | 26 | 27
7 | Anna Balsukova (RUS) | 1 | 24 | 24 | 26 | 25

== See also ==
- Archery at the 2018 Asian Games – Women's individual recurve
- Archery at the 2019 Pan American Games – Women's individual recurve
