= Archery at the 2019 European Games =

- Venue: Olympic Sports Complex
- Dates: 21–27 June
- Competitors: 128 from 42 nations

At the 2019 European Games in Minsk, eight events of archery were contested, all in the target archery format. Five events were held with recurve bows and three with compound bows. The events in recurve are also used as Continental Qualification Tournament for the 2020 Summer Olympics.

== Qualification ==
The WAE Executive Board approved the qualification system in November 2017. A total of 128 athletes qualified for the games, 96 in recurve and 32 in compound.

=== Summary ===
Nation	Recurve					Compound			Total
Nation	Men's individual	Men's team	Women's individual	Women's team	Mixed team	Men's individual	Women's individual	Mixed team	Total
Albania	1								1
Austria	1		1		X				2
Azerbaijan			1						1
Belarus	3	X	3	X	X	1	1	X	8
Belgium	1		1		X		1		3
Bulgaria	1		1		X				2
Croatia	1		1		X	1	1	X	4
Cyprus	1		1		X		1		3
Czech Republic	1					1			2
Denmark			3	X			1		4
Estonia	1		1		X		1		3
Finland	1		1		X	1			3
France	3	X	1		X	1	1	X	6
Georgia	1		1		X				2
Germany	1		3	X	X	1	1	X	6
Great Britain	3	X	3	X	X	1	1	X	8
Greece	1		1		X				2
Hungary	1								1
Iceland							1		1
Ireland			1						1
Israel	1								1
Italy	3	X	3	X	X	1	1	X	8
Kosovo			1						1
Latvia	1								1
Lithuania			1						1
Luxembourg	3	X				1			4
Moldova	1		1		X				2
Montenegro			1						1
Netherlands	3	X	1		X	1	1	X	6
Poland	1		1		X	1			3
Portugal						1			1
Romania			1						1
Russia	3	X	3	X	X	1	1	X	8
San Marino	1								1
Serbia						1			1
Slovakia	1		1		X				2
Slovenia	1		1		X		1		3
Spain	3	X	1		X		1		5
Sweden	1		1		X	1			3
Switzerland	1		1		X				2
Turkey	1		3	X	X	1	1	X	6
Ukraine	1		3	X	X				4
42 NOCs	48	8	48	8	25	16	16	9	128

=== Recurve ===
Mean of qualification	Date	Host	Athletes per NOC	Total places	Qualified men's	Qualified women's
Host nation	—		3	3	Belarus	Belarus
2018 European Championships (team)	27–31 August 2018	(Poland) Legnica	3	15	Great Britain; Italy; Luxembourg; Russia; Spain	Germany; Great Britain; Italy; Russia; Turkey
2018 European Championships (individual)	27–31 August 2018	(Poland) Legnica	1	14	Austria; Belgium; Bulgaria; Croatia; Finland; Germany; Hungary; Latvia; Moldova; Poland; Slovenia; Sweden; Turkey; Ukraine	Austria; Azerbaijan; Belgium; Estonia; France; Georgia; Greece; Moldova; Netherlands; ~~Norway~~; Poland; Slovakia; Spain; Sweden
2019 European Grand Prix (team)	9–13 April 2019	(Romania) Bucharest	3	6	France; Netherlands	Denmark; Ukraine
2019 European Grand Prix (individual)	9–13 April 2019	(Romania) Bucharest	1	7	Estonia; Georgia; Greece; Israel; ~~Norway~~; Slovakia; Switzerland	Bulgaria; Croatia; Finland; Ireland; Romania; Slovenia; Switzerland
Universality places	—		1	3	Albania; ~~Liechtenstein~~; San Marino	Kosovo; Lithuania; Montenegro
Reallocation			1		Cyprus; Czech Republic	Cyprus
Total					48 athletes	48 athletes

=== Compound ===
Mean of qualification	Date	Host	Athletes per NOC	Total places	Qualified men's	Qualified women's
Host nation	—		1	1	Belarus	Belarus
2018 European Championships (individual)	27–31 August 2018	(Poland) Legnica	1	8	Croatia; Finland; France; Italy; Luxembourg; Netherlands; Russia; Turkey	Belgium; Denmark; France; Netherlands; Russia; Slovenia; Spain; Turkey
2019 European Grand Prix (individual)	9–13 April 2019	(Romania) Bucharest	1	5	Germany; Great Britain; Poland; Serbia; Sweden	Croatia; Estonia; Germany; Great Britain; Italy
Universality places	—		1	2	Czech Republic; Portugal	Cyprus; Iceland
Total					16 athletes	16 athletes

== Medal summary ==
=== Medal table ===
* Host nation (Belarus)

Rank	Nation	Gold	Silver	Bronze	Total
1	Italy	3	1	1	5
2	Netherlands	1	3	1	5
3	Great Britain	1	1	0	2
3	Russia	1	1	0	2
5	France	1	0	1	2
6	Slovenia	1	0	0	1
7	Belarus*	0	1	0	1
7	Luxembourg	0	1	0	1
9	Croatia	0	0	1	1
9	Denmark	0	0	1	1
9	Germany	0	0	1	1
9	Spain	0	0	1	1
9	Turkey	0	0	1	1
Totals (13 entries)		8	8	8	24

=== Recurve ===
Event	Gold	Silver	Bronze
Men's individual	Mauro Nespoli; Italy	Steve Wijler; Netherlands	Pablo Acha; Spain
Men's team	France; Pierre Plihon; Thomas Chirault; Jean-Charles Valladont	Netherlands; Sjef van den Berg; Jan van Tongeren; Steve Wijler	Italy; Marco Galiazzo; Mauro Nespoli; David Pasqualucci
Women's individual	Tatiana Andreoli; Italy	Lucilla Boari; Italy	Gabriela Bayardo; Netherlands
Women's team	Great Britain; Sarah Bettles; Naomi Folkard; Bryony Pitman	Belarus; Karyna Dziominskaya; Karyna Kazlouskaya; Hanna Marusava	Denmark; Randi Degn; Maja Jager; Anne Marie Laursen
Mixed team	Italy; Lucilla Boari; Mauro Nespoli	Great Britain; Naomi Folkard; Patrick Huston	Germany; Michelle Kroppen; Cedric Rieger

=== Compound ===
Event	Gold	Silver	Bronze
Men's individual	Mike Schloesser; Netherlands	Gilles Seywert; Luxembourg	Mario Vavro; Croatia
Women's individual	Toja Ellison; Slovenia	Natalia Avdeeva; Russia	Sophie Dodemont; France
Mixed team	Russia; Natalia Avdeeva; Anton Bulaev	Netherlands; Sanne de Laat; Mike Schloesser	Turkey; Yeşim Bostan; Evren Çağıran
