= Archery at the 2019 European Games – Women's team recurve =

Women's team recurve at the 2019 European Games
- Venue: Olympic Sports Complex
- Date: 21, 22 June
- Competitors: 24 from 8 nations

Medalists
gold medal	Sarah Bettles; Naomi Folkard; Bryony Pitman	Great Britain
silver medal	Karyna Dziominskaya; Karyna Kazlouskaya; Hanna Marusava	Belarus
bronze medal	Randi Degn; Maja Jager; Anne Marie Laursen	Denmark

The women's team recurve competition at the 2019 European Games was held from 21 to 22 June 2019 at the Olympic Sports Complex in Minsk, Belarus.

== Records ==
Prior to the competition, the existing world, European and Games records were as follows:

- 216 arrow ranking round

World record	South Korea (KOR); Chang Hye-jin; Kang Chae-young; Lee Eun-kyung	2053	Antalya, Turkey	21 May 2018
European record	Germany (GER); Lisa Unruh; Elena Richter; Michelle Kroppen	1996	Bucharest, Romania	10 April 2019
Games record	Germany; Lisa Unruh; Karina Winter; Elena Richter	1952	Baku, Azerbaijan	16 June 2015

== Ranking round ==
The ranking round took place on 21 June 2019 to determine the seeding for the knockout rounds.

Rank	Nation	Archer	Individual total	Team total
1	Russia	Anna Balsukova; Ksenia Perova; Inna Stepanova	649; 662; 652	1963 GR
2	Belarus	Karyna Dziominskaya; Karyna Kazlouskaya; Hanna Marusava	648; 654; 628	1930
3	Italy	Tatiana Andreoli; Lucilla Boari; Vanessa Landi	645; 650; 631	1926
4	Great Britain	Sarah Bettles; Naomi Folkard; Bryony Pitman	640; 642; 640	1922
5	Turkey	Aybüke Aktuna; Yasemin Anagöz; Gülnaz Coşkun	624; 645; 618	1887
6	Germany	Michelle Kroppen; Elena Richter; Lisa Unruh	645; 627; 610	1882
7	Ukraine	Veronika Marchenko; Anastasia Pavlova; Lidiia Sichenikova	635; 625; 606	1866
8	Denmark	Randi Degn; Maja Jager; Anne Marie Laursen	609; 630; 605	1844

== Elimination rounds ==
Quarterfinals
1	Russia (RUS)	4	50	51	54	53	23
8	Denmark (DEN)	5	49	49	55	55	25
5	Turkey (TUR)	0	49	51	52
4	Great Britain (GBR)	6	54	56	53
3	Italy (ITA)	0	53	50	51
6	Germany (GER)	6	54	52	57
7	Ukraine (UKR)	3	50	46	53	54
2	Belarus (BLR)	5	53	51	52	54

Semifinals
8	Denmark (DEN)	0	53	54	53
4	Great Britain (GBR)	6	55	57	55
6	Germany (GER)	0	56	57	52
2	Belarus (BLR)	6	57	59	53

Gold medal match
4	Great Britain (GBR)	6	56	52	53	56
2	Belarus (BLR)	2	47	53	52	52
Third place
8	Denmark (DEN)	5	53	49	52	48	27
6	Germany (GER)	4	51	53	49	57	26
