= Ciara Dunne =

Ciara Dunne may refer to:

- A contestant on Cabin Fever (TV series) (2003)
- A contestant on Operation Transformation (TV series) (2010)
- Ciara Dunne (archer), Irish; see 2019 World Archery Championships – Women's Team Recurve
