= 2022 European Archery Championships – Women's individual compound =

Archery competition

Women's Individual Compound at the 2022 European Archery Championships
- Location: Munich, Germany
- Dates: 6–11 June
- Competitors: 47 from 21 nations

Medalists
gold medal	Isabelle Carpenter	Great Britain
silver medal	Sophie Dodemont	France
bronze medal	Ayşe Bera Süzer	Turkey

The women's individual compound competition at the 2022 European Archery Championships took place from 6 to 11 June in Munich, Germany.

== Qualification round ==
Results after 72 arrows.

Rank	Name	Nation	Score	10+X	X
1	Ella Gibson	United Kingdom	709	61	31
2	Tanja Gellenthien	Denmark	709	61	24
3	Yeşim Bostan	Turkey	700	55	20
4	Sarah Prieels	Belgium	698	52	18
5	Lisell Jäätma	Estonia	696	50	17
6	Sanne de Laat	Netherlands	696	50	17
7	Sophie Dodemont	France	695	48	20
8	Amanda Milinaric	Croatia	694	52	19
9	Elisa Roner	Italy	694	46	17
10	Mariya Shkolna	Luxembourg	693	47	26
11	Ayşe Bera Süzer	Turkey	693	46	16
12	Satu Nisula	Finland	692	46	15
13	Marcella Toniella	Italy	692	44	27
14	Jessica Stretton	United Kingdom	690	45	20
15	Sandra Herve	France	690	45	20
16	Songül Lök	Turkey	689	44	25
17	Jody Beckers	Netherlands	687	42	13
18	Julia Boehnke	Germany	684	42	17
19	Malgorzata Kapusta	Poland	683	39	9
20	Lola Grandjean	France	682	39	19
21	Maris Tetsmann	Estonia	681	38	13
22	Anna Maria Alfreðsdóttir	Iceland	680	36	11
23	Martina Zikmundova	Czech Republic	680	35	13
24	Carolin Landesfeind	Germany	679	44	13
25	Kseniia Shkliar	Ukraine	679	37	9
26	Meeri-Marita Paas	Estonia	679	35	16
27	Sara Ret	Italy	679	34	10
28	Isabelle Carpenter	United Kingdom	677	35	17
29	Natacha Stutz	Denmark	674	39	11
30	Martine Stas-Couwenberg	Netherlands	674	37	11
31	Andrea Muñoz	Spain	673	35	10
32	Ingrid Ronacher	Austria	670	30	14
33	Sandra Jankowska	Poland	665	31	9
34	Maria-Joao Ribeiro	Portugal	665	28	10
35	Julija Oleksejenko	Latvia	660	26	10
36	Erika Damsbo	Denmark	660	29	10
37	Olha Khomutovska	Ukraine	658	31	11
38	Viktoriia Kardash	Ukraine	657	26	4
39	Myriam Hasler	Switzerland	656	28	11
40	Franziska Goeppel	Germany	653	28	12
41	Ksenija Markitantova	Poland	653	24	5
42	Clémentine de Giuli	Switzerland	642	20	3
43	Liliana Cardoso	Portugal	638	22	4
44	Rita Pereria	Portugal	630	17	6
45	Petra Kocutova	Slovakia	619	21	9
46	Ewa Ploszaj	Iceland	616	17	3
47	Sveinbjörg Rósa Sumarliðadóttir	Iceland	597	14	5

== Final round ==
Semifinals
9	(Italy) Elisa Roner	142
28	(United Kingdom) Isabelle Carpenter	146
11	(Turkey) Ayşe Bera Süzer	141
7	(France) Sophie Dodemont	145

Finals
28	(United Kingdom) Isabelle Carpenter	143
7	(France) Sophie Dodemont	141
Third place
9	(Italy) Elisa Roner	142
11	(Turkey) Ayşe Bera Süzer	144

== Elimination round ==
=== Section 1 ===
1/24 finals
1	(United Kingdom) Ella Gibson
Bye
33	(Poland) Sandra Jankowska	136^{9+}
32	(Austria) Ingrid Ronacher	136^{9}
17	(Netherlands) Jody Beckers
Bye
Bye
16	(Turkey) Songül Lök
9	(Italy) Elisa Roner
Bye
41	(Poland) Ksenija Markitantova	143
24	(Germany) Carolin Landesfeind	142
25	(Ukraine) Kseniia Shkliar	138
40	(Germany) Franziska Goeppel	137
Bye
8	(Croatia) Amanda Milinaric

1/16 finals
1	(United Kingdom) Ella Gibson	148
33	(Poland) Sandra Jankowska	133
17	(Netherlands) Jody Beckers	140
16	(Turkey) Songül Lök	145
9	(Italy) Elisa Roner	139
41	(Poland) Ksenija Markitantova	133
25	(Ukraine) Kseniia Shkliar	142
8	(Croatia) Amanda Milinaric	141

1/8 finals
1	(United Kingdom) Ella Gibson	148
16	(Turkey) Songül Lök	145
9	(Italy) Elisa Roner	145
25	(Ukraine) Kseniia Shkliar	138

Quarterfinals
1	(United Kingdom) Ella Gibson	146
9	(Italy) Elisa Roner	147

=== Section 2 ===
1/24 finals
5	(Estonia) Lisell Jäätma
Bye
37	(Ukraine) Olha Khomutovska	143
28	(United Kingdom) Isabelle Carpenter	145
21	(Estonia) Maris Tetsmann	141
44	(Portugal) Rita Pereria	136
Bye
12	(Finland) Satu Nisula
13	(Italy) Marcella Toniella
Bye
45	(Slovakia) Petra Kocutova	137
20	(France) Lola Grandjean	140
29	(Denmark) Natacha Stutz	139
36	(Denmark) Erika Damsbo	137
Bye
4	(Belgium) Sarah Prieels

1/16 finals
5	(Estonia) Lisell Jäätma	142
28	(United Kingdom) Isabelle Carpenter	143
21	(Estonia) Maris Tetsmann	136
12	(Finland) Satu Nisula	138
13	(Italy) Marcella Toniella	144
20	(France) Lola Grandjean	139
29	(Denmark) Natacha Stutz	136
4	(Belgium) Sarah Prieels	145

1/8 finals
28	(United Kingdom) Isabelle Carpenter	145
12	(Finland) Satu Nisula	136
13	(Italy) Marcella Toniella	142
4	(Belgium) Sarah Prieels	144

Quarterfinals
28	(United Kingdom) Isabelle Carpenter	144
4	(Belgium) Sarah Prieels	142

=== Section 3 ===
1/24 finals
3	(Turkey) Yeşim Bostan
Bye
35	(Latvia) Julija Oleksejenko	136
30	(Netherlands) Martine Stas-Couwenberg	137
19	(Poland) Malgorzata Kapusta	143
46	(Iceland) Ewa Ploszaj	130
Bye
14	(United Kingdom) Jessica Stretton
11	(Turkey) Ayşe Bera Süzer
Bye
43	(Portugal) Liliana Cardoso	128
22	(Iceland) Anna Maria Alfreðsdóttir	145
27	(Italy) Sara Ret	142
38	(Ukraine) Viktoriia Kardash	136
Bye
6	(Netherlands) Sanne de Laat

1/16 finals
3	(Turkey) Yeşim Bostan	147
30	(Netherlands) Martine Stas-Couwenberg	138
19	(Poland) Malgorzata Kapusta	137
14	(United Kingdom) Jessica Stretton	139
11	(Turkey) Ayşe Bera Süzer	143
22	(Iceland) Anna Maria Alfreðsdóttir	140
27	(Italy) Sara Ret	138
6	(Netherlands) Sanne de Laat	137

1/8 finals
3	(Turkey) Yeşim Bostan	135
14	(United Kingdom) Jessica Stretton	142
11	(Turkey) Ayşe Bera Süzer	143
27	(Italy) Sara Ret	142

Quarterfinals
14	(United Kingdom) Jessica Stretton	139
11	(Turkey) Ayşe Bera Süzer	147

=== Section 4 ===
1/24 finals
7	(France) Sophie Dodemont
Bye
39	(Switzerland) Myriam Hasler	138
26	(Estonia) Meeri-Marita Paas	144
23	(Czech Republic) Martina Zikmundova	144
42	(Switzerland) Clémentine de Giuli	136
Bye
10	(Luxembourg) Mariya Shkolna
15	(France) Sandra Herve
Bye
47	(Iceland) Sveinbjörg Rósa Sumarliðadóttir	121
18	(Germany) Julia Boehnke	144
31	(Spain) Andrea Muñoz	147
34	(Portugal) Maria-Joao Ribeiro	139
Bye
2	(Denmark) Tanja Gellenthien

1/16 finals
7	(France) Sophie Dodemont	143^{10,10}
26	(Estonia) Meeri-Marita Paas	143^{10,9}
23	(Czech Republic) Martina Zikmundova	137
10	(Luxembourg) Mariya Shkolna	140
15	(France) Sandra Herve	142
18	(Germany) Julia Boehnke	141
31	(Spain) Andrea Muñoz	143
2	(Denmark) Tanja Gellenthien	148

1/8 finals
7	(France) Sophie Dodemont	143
10	(Luxembourg) Mariya Shkolna	139
15	(France) Sandra Herve	139
2	(Denmark) Tanja Gellenthien	148

Quarterfinals
7	(France) Sophie Dodemont	142
2	(Denmark) Tanja Gellenthien	134
