= Junczyk =

Junczyk (Polish pronunciation: ['junt͡ʂɨk]; feminine Junczyk; plural Junczykowie) is a Polish surname.

== Etymology ==
The surname comes from the Old Polish adjective word juny inherited from Proto-Slavic *junъ meaning a young, with the suffix -czyk serving as a patronymic.

At the same time, it is a surname with a coat of arms origin - from the coat of arms of the same name, the etymology of which comes from a legendary soldier named Junczyk.

It functions in parallel with the surname Juńczyk, which is a version with the diacritical letter ń.

== Notable people with the surname include ==
- Anna Junczyk-Paczuska (born 1980), Polish archer
- Ewa Junczyk-Ziomecka (born 1949), Polish diplomat
