= Ayşe Bera Süzer =

Turkish archer (born 1996)

Personal information
- Born: 1 January 1996 (age 30)

Sport
- Country: Turkey
- Sport: Archery
- Event: compound
- Club: Eskişehir Okçuluk
Medal record
Women's Archery
Representing Turkey
European Championships
Gold medal – first place	2016 Nottingham	Team
Gold medal – first place	2018 Legnica	Team
Gold medal – first place	2024 Essen	Team
Bronze medal – third place	2022 Munich	Individual
Bronze medal – third place	2022 Munich	Team
Bronze medal – third place	2024 Essen	Mixed team
World Cup
Gold medal – first place	2022 Paris	Team
Silver medal – second place	2022 Antalya	Team
Bronze medal – third place	2016 Shanghai	Team
Bronze medal – third place	2018 Berlin	Team
European Indoor Championships
Silver medal – second place	2025 Samsun	Team
Islamic Solidarity Games
Gold medal – first place	2021 Konya	Team
Bronze medal – third place	2021 Konya	Individual

Ayşe Bera Süzer (born 1 January 1996) is a Turkish compound archer.

== Career ==
At the 2018 European Archery Championships in Legnica, Poland, she won the gold medal in the women's team compound event.

In 2022, she won the bronze medal in the women's team compound event at the European Indoor Archery Championships held in Laško, Slovenia. She also won the bronze medal in the women's individual compound event. She won the silver medal in the women'svteam compound event at the Antalya, Turkey event in the 2022 Archery World Cup.

She won the bronze medal in the women's individual compound event at the 2022 European Archery Championships held in Munich, Germany. She also won the bronze medal in the women's team compound event.
