= 2022 European Archery Championships – Women's team compound =

Archery competition

Women's Team Compound at the 2022 European Archery Championships
- Location: Munich, Germany
- Dates: 7–11 June
- Competitors: 36 from 12 nations
- Teams: 12

Medalists
| gold medal | Isabelle Carpenter; Ella Gibson; Jessica Stretton | Great Britain |
| silver medal | Sara Ret; Elisa Roner; Marcella Tonioli | Italy |
| bronze medal | Yeşim Bostan; Ayşe Bera Süzer; Songül Lök | Turkey |

2022 European Archery Championships
| Men | Recurve | Compound |
| Women | Recurve | Compound |
| Team | Men's recurve | Men's compound |
| Team | Women's recurve | Women's compound |
| Mixed team | Recurve | Compound |

The women's team compound competition at the 2022 European Archery Championships took place from 7 to 11 June in Munich, Germany.

== Qualification round ==
Results after 216 arrows.

| Rank | Nation | Name | Score | 10+X | X |
|---|---|---|---|---|---|
| 1 | Turkey | Yeşim Bostan; Ayşe Bera Süzer; Songül Lök | 2082 | 145 | 61 |
| 2 | Great Britain | Jessica Stretton; Ella Gibson; Isabelle Carpenter | 2076 | 141 | 68 |
| 3 | France | Sophie Dodemont; Lola Grandjean; Sandra Hervé | 2067 | 130 | 56 |
| 4 | Italy | Sara Ret; Elisa Roner; Marcella Tonioli | 2065 | 124 | 54 |
| 5 | Netherlands | Sanne de Laat; Martine Stas-Couwenberg; Jody Beckers | 2057 | 129 | 41 |
| 6 | Estonia | Lisell Jäätma; Meeri-Marita Paas; Maris Tetsmann | 2056 | 123 | 46 |
| 7 | Denmark | Erika Damsbo; Tanja Gellenthien; Natacha Stütz | 2042 | 129 | 45 |
| 8 | Germany | Julia Böhnke; Franziska Göppel; Carolin Landesfeind | 2016 | 114 | 42 |
| 9 | Poland | Sandra Jankowska; Małgorzata Kapusta; Ksenija Markitantova | 2001 | 94 | 23 |
| 10 | Ukraine | Viktoriia Kardash; Olha Khomutovska; Kseniia Shkliar | 1994 | 94 | 24 |
| 11 | Portugal | Liliana Cardoso; Rita Pereria; Maria João Ribeiro | 1933 | 67 | 20 |
| 12 | Iceland | Anna María Alfreðsdóttir; Ewa Ploszaj; Sveinbjörg Rósa Sumarliðadóttir | 1893 | 67 | 19 |

== Elimination round ==
1/8 finals
9 | Poland | 229
8 | Germany | 224
5 | Netherlands | 222
12 | Iceland | 205
11 | Portugal | 217
6 | Estonia | 233
7 | Denmark | 230
10 | Ukraine | 227

Quarterfinals
1 | Turkey | 229
9 | Poland | 220
5 | Netherlands | 227
4 | Italy | 230
3 | France | 228
6 | Estonia | 234
7 | Denmark | 224
2 | Great Britain | 230

Semifinals
1 | Turkey | 231
4 | Italy | 233
6 | Estonia | 227
2 | Great Britain | 231

Final
4 | Italy | 229
2 | Great Britain | 232
Third place
1 | Turkey | 231
6 | Estonia | 226
