= Sarah Bettles =

British archer (born 1992)

Personal information
- Born: 16 October 1992 (age 33) Harold Wood, England

Sport
- Country: United Kingdom
- Sport: Archery
Medal record
Women's recurve archery
Representing United Kingdom
World Championships
Bronze medal – third place	2019 's-Hertogenbosch	Team
European Games
Gold medal – first place	2019 Minsk	Team

Sarah Bettles (born 16 October 1992) is a British archer competing in women's recurve events. She won the gold medal in the women's recurve team event at the 2019 European Games held in Minsk, Belarus. She also competed in the women's individual recurve event. Earlier in 2019, she won the bronze medal in the women's team recurve event at the World Archery Championships held in 's-Hertogenbosch, Netherlands.

In 2021, Bettles represented Great Britain at the 2020 Summer Olympics in Tokyo, Japan. She competed in the women's individual, women's team and mixed team events.
