= Songül Lök =

Turkish archer (born 2002)

Personal information
- Nationality: Turkish
- Born: 9 January 2002 (age 24) Muğla, Turkey

Sport
- Country: Turkey
- Sport: Archery
- Event: compound
- Club: Muğla BB
Medal record
Women's Archery
Representing Turkey
European Championships
Bronze medal – third place	2022 Munich	Team
World Cup
Gold medal – first place	2022 Paris	Team
European Indoor Championships
Silver medal – second place	2022 Laško	U-21 Individual
Silver medal – second place	2022 Laško	U-21 Team

Songül Lök (born 9 January 2002) is a Turkish compound archer.

== Career ==
In 2022, she won the bronze medal in the women's team compound event at the European Indoor Archery Championships held in Laško, Slovenia. She won the silver medal in the women's U-21 team compound event at the Laško, Slovenia event in the 2022 European Indoor Archery Championships. She also won the silver medal in the women's individual compound event.
