= Anna Junczyk-Paczuska =

Polish archer (born 1980)

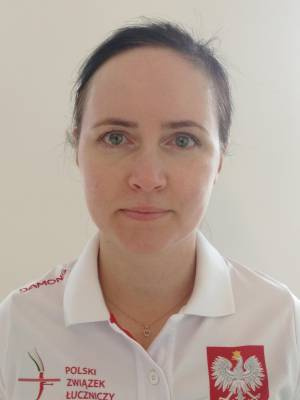

Personal information
- Full name: Anna Lidia Junczyk-Paczuska
- Nationality: Polish
- Born: 8 April 1980 (age 46) Warsaw, Poland

Sport
- Country: Poland
- Sport: Archery
- Event: Barebow
- Team: „Łuczniczy Marymont” Association
Medal record
Women's archery
Representing Poland
Bronze medal – third place	2022 Laško	Team

Anna Lidia Junczyk-Paczuska (Polish pronunciation: ['anna 'junt͡ʂɨk-pa't͡ʂuska]; born 8 April 1980) is a Polish archer.

== Career ==
During the 2022 European Indoor Archery Championships in Laško, Slovenia, Anna Junczyk-Paczuska, performing together with Regina Karkoszka and Inga Zagrodzka-Dobija, won a bronze medal for women's team barebow shooting.

== Personal life ==
From February 20, 2023, she became vice-president of the management board of the "Łuczniczy Marymont" Association.
