= 2022 European Indoor Archery Championships =

Sporting event 2022

2022 Archery European Indoor Championships
- Venue: Tri Lilije Hall
- Location: Laško, Slovenia
- Dates: 14–19 February 2022
- Competitors: 299 from 30 nations

The 2022 European Indoor Archery Championships was the 18th edition of the European Indoor Archery Championships. The event was held in Laško, Slovenia from 14 to 19 February 2022. At the European Archery Indoor Championships was debuted the barebow discipline. Events staged in each of the three disciplines in the senior and under-21 age brackets.

== Medals table ==
* Host nation (Slovenia)

Rank	Nation	Gold	Silver	Bronze	Total
1	Ukraine	4	0	2	6
2	Italy	3	5	4	12
3	Russia	3	3	6	12
4	France	3	2	1	6
5	Denmark	2	0	0	2
5	Netherlands	2	0	0	2
5	Sweden	2	0	0	2
8	Turkey	1	5	4	10
9	Great Britain	1	2	1	4
10	Romania	1	2	0	3
11	Belarus	0	1	0	1
11	Estonia	0	1	0	1
11	Israel	0	1	0	1
14	Poland	0	0	1	1
14	Portugal	0	0	1	1
14	Slovenia*	0	0	1	1
Totals (16 entries)		22	22	21	65

== Medalists ==
=== Senior ===
Event	Gold	Silver	Bronze
Recurve Men	Clément Jacquey; France	Jean-Charles Valladont; France	Erdem Tsydypov; Russia
Recurve Men Team	France; Thomas Chirault; Clément Jacquey; Jean-Charles Valladont	Belarus; Kiryl Firsau; Anton Karoukin; Raman Nikitsionak	Italy; Federico Musolesi; Mauro Nespoli; Alessandro Paoli
Compound Men	Mike Schloesser; Netherlands	Jean Philippe Boulch; France	Nicolas Girard; France
Compound Men Team	Netherlands; Sil Pater; Mike Schloesser; Max Verwoerdt	Turkey; Demir Elmaağaçlı; Emircan Haney; Furkan Oruç	Portugal; Cláudio Alves; Rui Pereira Baptista; Carlos Resende
Barebow Men	Leo Pettersson; Sweden	Oliver Hicks; Great Britain	Vitalii Budiak; Russia
Barebow Men Team	Sweden; Viggo Axelsson; Joakim Hassila; Leo Pettersson	Italy; Simone Barbieri; Valter Basteri; Daniele Bellotti	Slovenia; Klemen Kelvišar; Robert Luštrek; Iztok Spinelli
Recurve Women	Lisa Barbelin; France	Vanessa Landi; Italy	Anastasia Pavlova; Ukraine
Recurve Women Team	Ukraine; Veronika Marchenko; Anastasia Pavlova; Polina Rodionova	Turkey; Gülnaz Büşranur Coşkun; Gizem Özkan; Assıya Yılmazer	Russia; Tuiana Budazhapova; Valeriya Mylnikova; Inna Stepanova
Compound Women	Ella Gibson; Great Britain	Elizaveta Knyazeva; Russia	Alexandra Savenkova; Russia
Compound Women Team	Russia; Viktoria Balzhanova; Elizaveta Knyazeva; Alexandra Savenkova	Estonia; Lisell Jäätma; Meeri-Marita Paas; Maris Tetsmann	Italy; Irene Franchini; Elisa Roner; Marcella Tonioli
Barebow Women	Cinzia Noziglia; Italy	Fabia Rovatti; Italy	Laura Turello; Italy
Barebow Women Team	Italy; Cinzia Noziglia; Fabia Rovatti; Laura Turello	Russia; Yulia Blanter; Maria Savenkova; Viktorija Zuravlova	Poland; Anna Junczyk-Paczuska; Regina Karkoszka; Inga Zagrodzka-Dobija

=== Under 21 ===
Event	Gold	Silver	Bronze
Recurve Under 21 Men	Alexander Kryvoruchko; Ukraine	Matteo Balsamo; Italy	Bair Torgubaev; Russia
Recurve Under 21 Men Team	Russia; Mukhibullo Makhmudov; Bair Torgubaev; Sergei Tsyrenov	Turkey; Berkay Akkoyun; Harun Kırmızıtaş; Efe Gürkan Maraş	Ukraine; Nikita Dunyashev; Alexander Kryvoruchko; Oleksandr Pantsyru
Compound Under 21 Men	Mathias Fullerton; Denmark	Shamai Yamrom; Israel	Batuhan Akçaoğlu; Turkey
Compound Under 21 Men Team	Denmark; Christoffer Berg; Tore Bjarnarson; Mathias Fullerton	Romania; Rareș Daniel Alexandrescu; Florin Mirel Judea; Teodor Vlad	Turkey; Batuhan Akçaoğlu; Eren Kırca; Yakup Yıldız
Barebow Under 21 Men	Davide Morra; Italy	Adrian Vlase; Romania	not awarded
Recurve Under 21 Women	Dzvenyslava Chernyk; Ukraine	Ceren Koçur; Turkey	Şevval Yakupoğlu; Turkey
Recurve Under 21 Women Team	Ukraine; Dzvenyslava Chernyk; Daria Koval; Zhanna Naumova	Italy; Chiara Compagno; Roberta Di Francesco; Ginevra Landi	Russia; Mariia Gilmanova; Renata Kurchatova; Viktoria Namdakova
Compound Under 21 Women	Arina Cherkezova; Russia	Songül Lök; Turkey	İpek Tomruk; Turkey
Compound Under 21 Women Team	Turkey; Hazal Burun; Songül Lök; İpek Tomruk	Russia; Arina Cherkezova; Ekaterina Rumyantseva; Nika Snetkova	Italy; Elisa Bazzichetto; Andrea Nicole Moccia; Martina Serafini
Barebow Under 21 Women	Elena Topliceanu; Romania	Amelia Chumber; Great Britain	Kathryn Morton; Great Britain

== Participating nations ==
299 archers from 30 countries:

1. Austria (4)
2. Belgium (1)
3. Belarus (10)
4. Bulgaria (5)
5. Croatia (5)
6. Denmark (7)
7. Estonia (6)
8. Finland (2)
9. France (18)
10. Faroe Islands (2)
11. United Kingdom (13)
12. Georgia (8)
13. Hungary (1)
14. Iceland (20)
15. Israel (8)
16. Italy (32)
17. Kosovo (3)
18. Moldova (6)
19. Netherlands (6)
20. Poland (18)
21. Portugal (10)
22. Romania (13)
23. Russia (28)
24. Slovenia (15) (Host)
25. Serbia (1)
26. Switzerland (4)
27. Slovakia (9)
28. Sweden (4)
29. Turkey (24)
30. Ukraine (16)
