= Karyna Kazlouskaya =

Belarusian archer (born 2000)

Karina Kazlouskaya
Personal information
- Native name: Karyna Kazlouskaya
- Born: 18 July 2000 (age 26)

Sport
- Country: Belarus (2012-2022); Poland (2022 - now)
- Sport: Archery
- Event: Recurve
Medal record
Women's recurve archery
Representing Belarus
European Games
Silver medal – second place	2019 Minsk	Team
Military World Games
Gold medal – first place	2019 Wuhan	Team

Karyna Kazlouskaya (Belarusian: Карына Казлоўская; born 18 July 2000) (also Karina Kozłowska) is a Belarusian and Polish archer competing in women's recurve events. In 2019, she represented Belarus at the European Games in Minsk, Belarus winning the silver medal in the women's team recurve event. She also competed in the women's individual recurve and mixed team recurve events.

At the 2019 Military World Games in Wuhan, China, she won the gold medal in the women's team event.

In 2021, Kazlouskaya represented Belarus at the 2020 Summer Olympics in Tokyo, Japan in the team and individual events. Her team (she, Hanna Marusava, and Karyna Dziominskaya) placed fourth. She also competed at the 2021 World Archery Championships held in Yankton, United States.

In 2022, disagreeing with Belarusian political situation and fearing political repressions, she moved to Poland. In January 2025 she was granted Polish citizenship. Before she was the holder of Karta Polaka, which she had been granted circa 10 years earlier. She is representing internationally Poland with the name Karina Kozłowska.
