= 2018 European Archery Championships =

- Location: Legnica, Poland
- Start date: 27 August
- End date: 1 September 2018
- Competitors: 331 from 43 nations

The 2018 European Archery Championships is the 25th edition of the European Archery Championships. The event was held in Legnica, Poland from 27 August to 1 September 2018.

== Medal summary ==
=== Recurve ===
| Event | Gold | Silver | Bronze |
|---|---|---|---|
| Men's individual | Steve Wijler; Netherlands | Dan Olaru; Moldova | Jean-Charles Valladont; France |
| Women's individual | Yasemin Anagöz; Turkey | Maja Jager; Denmark | Gülnaz Büşranur Coşkun; Turkey |
| Men's team | Russia; Arsalan Baldanov; Galsan Bazarzhapov; Vitalii Popov | Italy; Marco Galiazzo; Mauro Nespoli; David Pasqualucci | Luxembourg; Jeff Henckels; Joe Klein; Pit Klein |
| Women's team | Turkey; Aybüke Aktuna; Yasemin Anagöz; Gülnaz Büşranur Coşkun | Italy; Tatiana Andreoli; Lucilla Boari; Vanessa Landi | Germany; Michelle Kroppen; Elena Richter; Lisa Unruh |
| Mixed Team | Italy; Vanessa Landi; Mauro Nespoli | France; Thomas Chirault; Melanie Gaubil | Russia; Arsalan Baldanov; Inna Stepanova |

=== Compound ===
| Event | Gold | Silver | Bronze |
|---|---|---|---|
| Men's individual | Anton Bulaev; Russia | Sergio Pagni; Italy | Federico Pagnoni; Italy |
| Women's individual | Andrea Marcos; Spain | Yeşim Bostan; Turkey | Tanja Jensen; Denmark |
| Men's team | Great Britain; Neil Bridgewater; James Mason; Adam Ravenscroft | France; Jean-Philippe Boulch; Pierre-Julien Deloche; Sebastien Peineau | Croatia; Domagoj Buden; Ivan Markes; Mario Vavro |
| Women's team | Turkey; Yeşim Bostan; Gizem Elmaağaçlı; Ayşe Bera Süzer | Italy; Anastasia Anastasio; Irene Franchini; Marcella Tonioli | Germany; Kristina Heigenhauser; Janine Meissner; Velia Schall |
| Mixed Team | France; Jean-Philippe Boulch; Sophie Dodemont | Netherlands; Mike Schloesser; Jody Vermeulen | Croatia; Domagoj Buden; Amanda Mlinaric |

=== Medal table ===
| Rank | Nation | Gold | Silver | Bronze | Total |
|---|---|---|---|---|---|
| 1 | Turkey | 3 | 1 | 1 | 5 |
| 2 | Russia | 2 | 0 | 1 | 3 |
| 3 | Italy | 1 | 4 | 1 | 6 |
| 4 | France | 1 | 2 | 1 | 4 |
| 5 | Netherlands | 1 | 1 | 0 | 2 |
| 6 | Great Britain | 1 | 0 | 0 | 1 |
| 6 | Spain | 1 | 0 | 0 | 1 |
| 8 | Denmark | 0 | 1 | 1 | 2 |
| 9 | Moldova | 0 | 1 | 0 | 1 |
| 10 | Croatia | 0 | 0 | 2 | 2 |
| 10 | Germany | 0 | 0 | 2 | 2 |
| 12 | Luxembourg | 0 | 0 | 1 | 1 |
| Totals (12 entries) | | 10 | 10 | 10 | 30 |
