= Ella Gibson =

British archer (born 2000)

Personal information
- Born: 7 June 2000 (age 26)

Sport
- Country: Great Britain
- Sport: Archery
- Event: Compound
Medal record
Women's compound archery
Representing Great Britain
World Field Championships
Bronze medal – third place	2024 Lac La Biche	Individual
Bronze medal – third place	2024 Lac La Biche	Mixed team
World Games
Gold medal – first place	2022 Birmingham	Individual
European Games
Silver medal – second place	2023 Kraków-Małopolska	Individual
European Championships
Gold medal – first place	2022 Munich	Team
Gold medal – first place	2024 Essen	Individual
Silver medal – second place	2021 Antalya	Individual
Silver medal – second place	2026 Antalya	Mixed team
Bronze medal – third place	2026 Antalya	Individual
European Indoor Championships
Gold medal – first place	2022 Laško	Individual
Gold medal – first place	2024 Varaždin	Team
Bronze medal – third place	2024 Varaždin	Individual
World Cup Final
Silver medal – second place	2022 Tlaxcala	Individual
Bronze medal – third place	2025 Nanjing	Individual
World Cup
Gold medal – first place	2019 Berlin	Mixed team
Gold medal – first place	2022 Antalya	Individual
Gold medal – first place	2022 Paris	Individual
Gold medal – first place	2022 Medellín	Individual
Gold medal – first place	2023 Paris	Individual
Gold medal – first place	2025 Madrid	Individual
Gold medal – first place	2025 Shanghai	Mixed team
Gold medal – first place	2026 Madrid	Mixed team
Gold medal – first place	2026 Madrid	Individual
Silver medal – second place	2019 Berlin	Team
Silver medal – second place	2021 Paris	Team
Silver medal – second place	2022 Paris	Team
Silver medal – second place	2022 Medellín	Team
Silver medal – second place	2023 Shanghai	Individual
Silver medal – second place	2024 Antalya	Mixed team
Bronze medal – third place	2019 Antalya	Team
Bronze medal – third place	2022 Paris	Mixed team
Bronze medal – third place	2024 Antalya	Individual
Bronze medal – third place	2024 Antalya	Team

Ella Gibson (born 7 June 2000) is a British archer competing in compound events. She won the gold medal in the women's compound event at the 2024 European Archery Championships held in Essen, Germany. She won the gold medal in her event at the 2022 European Indoor Archery Championships held in Laško, Slovenia.

Gibson also won the gold medal in the women's compound event at the 2022 World Games held in Birmingham, Alabama, United States.

== Early life ==
Gibson first tried archery in October 2014 and she joined an archery club in June 2015.

== Career ==
At the 2019 World Archery Youth Championships held in Madrid, Spain, she won the bronze medal in the women's junior compound team event. In November 2019, Gibson set a new world record for the women's 60-arrow 18-metre indoor ranking round with a total of 596 out of 600 points at the GT Open held in Strassen, Luxembourg. The record stood for approximately three weeks as Sarah Prieels of Belgium set a new record of 597 out of 600 points in December 2019.

Gibson won the silver medal in the women's compound event at the 2021 European Archery Championships held in Antalya, Turkey. In September 2021, she set a new world record for most points scored in women's 36-arrow 60-metre outdoor compound archery at the Battle of Britain 1440 event held in Burnham-on-Sea, Somerset, United Kingdom. In that same month, she also competed at the 2021 World Archery Championships held in Yankton, United States. She competed in the women's compound, women's team compound and compound mixed team events. In the women's compound competition she finished in second place in the ranking round and she was eliminated in the elimination round by Song Yun-soo of South Korea.

In January 2022, Gibson finished in third place in the Women’s Open Pro event at the Lancaster Archery Classic held near Lancaster, Pennsylvania, United States. In February 2022, she won the gold medal in the women's compound event at the 2022 European Indoor Archery Championships held in Laško, Slovenia. Gibson won the gold medal in the women's team compound event at the 2022 European Archery Championships held in Munich, Germany.

Gibson has also won medals at several events of the Archery World Cup. She won three medals in the 2019 Archery World Cup and one medal in the 2021 Archery World Cup. She won the gold medal in the women's compound event at the Antalya, Turkey event in the 2022 Archery World Cup. She also won the gold medal in this event at the Paris, France event of the 2022 Archery World Cup. In Paris, France, she also won the silver medal in the women's team event and the bronze medal in the mixed team event.

Gibson won the gold medal in the women's compound event at the 2022 World Games held in Birmingham, Alabama, United States. She defeated Sara López of Colombia in her gold medal match.

She won two medals at the 2022 Archery World Cup competition held in Medellín, Colombia: the gold medal in the women's individual event and the silver medal in the women's team event. A few months later, she won the silver medal in the final of the 2022 Archery World Cup held in Tlaxcala, Mexico.

Gibson won the silver medal in the women's compound event at the 2023 European Games held in Poland. She also set a new world record of 715 points during the ranking round. In August 2023, she competed in the women's individual compound and women's team compound events at the World Archery Championships held in Berlin, Germany.

Gibson finished in second place in the women's compound event at the 2024 The Vegas Shoot held in Las Vegas, United States. In the same year, she won two medals at the 2024 European Indoor Archery Championships held in Varaždin, Croatia: the gold medal in the women's team event and the bronze medal in the women's individual event. A few months later, Gibson won the gold medal in her event at the 2024 European Archery Championships held in Essen, Germany. She defeated Elisa Roner of Italy in her gold medal match.

In September 2024, Gibson won two bronze medals at the World Field Archery Championships held in Lac La Biche, Canada: she won the bronze medal in the women's individual compound event and the bronze medal in the mixed team compound event.

Gibson trains in a private indoor training hall in the factory of her father's ice cream business.
