= Karyna Dziominskaya =

Belarusian archer (born 1994)

Personal information
- Native name: Карына Дзёмінская
- Born: 25 August 1994 (age 31)

Sport
- Country: Belarus
- Sport: Archery
- Event: Recurve
Medal record
Women's recurve archery
Representing Belarus
European Games
Silver medal – second place	2019 Minsk	Team
European Championships
Silver medal – second place	2026 Antalya	Team
Military World Games
Gold medal – first place	2019 Wuhan	Team
Bronze medal – third place	2015 Mungyeong	Team

Karyna Dziominskaya (born 25 August 1994) is a Belarusian archer competing in women's recurve events. She represented Belarus at the 2019 European Games in Minsk, Belarus winning the silver medal in the women's team recurve event. She also competed in the women's individual recurve event.

At the 2019 Military World Games in Wuhan, China, she won the gold medal in the women's team event.

In 2021, she represented Belarus at the 2020 Summer Olympics in Tokyo, Japan in the team and individual events. Her team (she, Hanna Marusava, and Karyna Kazlouskaya) placed fourth.
