= Vanessa Landi =

Italian archer (born 1997)

Personal information
- Born: 12 September 1997 (age 28)

Sport
- Country: Italy
- Sport: Archery
- Event: Recurve
Medal record
Women's recurve archery
Representing Italy
World Championships
Bronze medal – third place	2019 's-Hertogenbosch	Mixed team
European Championships
Gold medal – first place	2018 Legnica	Mixed team
Silver medal – second place	2018 Legnica	Team

Vanessa Landi (born 12 September 1997) is an Italian archer competing in women's recurve events. Landi and Mauro Nespoli won the bronze medal in the mixed team recurve event at the 2019 World Archery Championships held in 's-Hertogenbosch, Netherlands.

At the 2018 European Archery Championships in Legnica, Poland, she won the silver medal in the women's team recurve event and the gold medal in the mixed recurve team event.

In 2019, Landi represented Italy at the European Games held in Minsk, Belarus without winning a medal. At the 2019 Archery World Cup she won, alongside Tatiana Andreoli and Lucilla Boari, the silver medal in the women's team recurve event in Medellín, Colombia.

In 2021, Landi competed at the World Archery Championships held in Yankton, United States.

Landi won the silver medal in the women's recurve event at the 2022 European Indoor Archery Championships held in Laško, Slovenia.
