= Tatiana Andreoli =

Italian archer (born 1999)

Personal information
- Born: 1 January 1999 (age 27) Venaria Reale, Italy

Sport
- Country: Italy
- Sport: Archery
- Event: Recurve
Medal record
Women's recurve archery
Representing Italy
World Championships
Bronze medal – third place	2023 Berlin	Mixed team
European Games
Gold medal – first place	2019 Minsk	Individual
Bronze medal – third place	2023 Kraków-Małopolska	Team
European Championships
Silver medal – second place	2018 Legnica	Team
Bronze medal – third place	2022 Munich	Mixed team
Bronze medal – third place	2026 Antalya	Team
European Indoor Championships
Gold medal – first place	2024 Varaždin	Individual
Silver medal – second place	2024 Varaždin	Team
Mediterranean Games
Silver medal – second place	2022 Oran	Team

Tatiana Andreoli (born 1 January 1999) is an Italian recurve archer. At the 2019 European Games held in Minsk, Belarus, she won the gold medal in the women's individual recurve event.

== Career ==
Andreoli won the gold medal in the junior women's recurve event at the 2017 European Indoor Archery Championships held in Vittel, France. She also won the gold medal in the junior women's team recurve event, alongside Tanya Giaccheri and Vanessa Landi. At the 2018 European Archery Championships in Legnica, Poland, she won the silver medal in the women's team recurve event.

Andreoli competed at the 2019 World Archery Championships held in 's-Hertogenbosch, Netherlands without winning a medal.

In 2021, Andreoli represented Italy at the 2020 Summer Olympics in Tokyo, Japan. She competed in the women's individual and women's team events. She finished in 52nd place in the ranking round of the individual event and she was then eliminated in the knockout section of the event by Lisa Barbelin of France.

Andreoli and Mauro Nespoli won the bronze medal in the mixed team recurve event at the 2022 European Archery Championships held in Munich, Germany.
