= Hanna Marusava =

Belarusian archer (born 1978)

Hanna Anatoleuna Marusava, née Karasiova (Belarusian: Ганна Анатолеўна Марусава (Карасёва); born 8 January 1978 in Mogilev) is an athlete from Belarus. She competes in archery.

Karasiova represented Belarus at the 2004 Summer Olympics. She placed 62nd in the women's individual ranking round with a 72-arrow score of 588. In the first round of elimination, she faced 3rd-ranked Yun Mi Jin of Korea. Karasiova lost 162–155 in the 18-arrow match, placing 37th overall in women's individual archery.

In 2021, she represented Belarus at the 2020 Summer Olympics in Tokyo, Japan in the team and individual events. Her team (she, Karyna Kazlouskaya, and Karyna Dziominskaya) placed fourth. She also competed at the 2021 World Archery Championships held in Yankton, United States.
