= Archery at the 2023 European Games – Women's individual recurve =

Archery event

Women's individual recurve at the 2023 European Games
- Venue: Plaszowianka Archery Park
- Date: 23–29 June
- Competitors: 46 from 30 nations

Medalists
gold medal	Penny Healey	Great Britain
silver medal	Elia Canales	Spain
bronze medal	Chiara Rebagliati	Italy

The women's individual recurve competition at the 2023 European Games was held from 23 to 29 June 2023 at the Plaszowianka Archery Park in Kraków, Poland.

== Records ==
Prior to the competition, the existing world, European and Games records were as follows:

- 72 arrow ranking round

World record	Kang Chae-young (KOR)	692	's-Hertogenbosch, Netherlands	10 June 2019
European record	Lisa Unruh (GER)	683	Berlin, Germany	2 August 2019
Games record	Gabriela Schloesser (NED)	666	Minsk, Belarus	21 June 2019

== Ranking round ==
The ranking round took place on 23 June 2023 to determine the seeding for the knockout rounds. It consisted of two rounds of 36 arrows, with a maximum score of 720.

Rank	Archer	Nation	Score	10s	Xs
1	Anastasia Pavlova	Ukraine	681 GR	40	13
2	Penny Healey	Great Britain	681 GR	38	14
3	Michelle Kroppen	Germany	680	36	10
4	Elia Canales	Spain	670	30	13
5	Marie Horáčková	Czech Republic	666	30	14
6	Tatiana Andreoli	Italy	663	26	11
7	Katharina Bauer	Germany	661	27	6
8	Charline Schwarz	Germany	659	31	10
9	Lisa Barbelin	France	659	25	7
10	Caroline Lopez	France	658	30	7
11	Alexandra Mîrca	Moldova	656	28	7
12	Lucilla Boari	Italy	656	26	9
13	Audrey Adiceom	France	653	26	5
14	Chiara Rebagliati	Italy	653	25	8
15	Christine Bjerendal	Sweden	653	25	7
16	Bryony Pitman	Great Britain	652	26	6
17	Denisa Baránková	Slovakia	652	23	11
18	Kirstine Andersen	Denmark	651	26	10
19	Ezgi Başaran	Turkey	650	29	10
20	Elisabeth Straka	Austria	647	23	11
21	Gaby Schloesser	Netherlands	647	20	2
22	Magdalena Śmiałkowska	Poland	647	19	4
23	Yaylagul Ramazanova	Azerbaijan	645	21	4
24	Randi Degn	Denmark	644	24	11
25	Zeynep Köse	Turkey	642	21	6
26	Dimitra Papadopoulou	Greece	641	20	11
27	Tsiko Putkaradze	Georgia	640	20	6
28	Jaspreet Sagoo	Great Britain	637	21	8
29	Žana Pintarič	Slovenia	636	21	8
30	Natalia Leśniak	Poland	636	20	6
31	Mikaella Moshe	Israel	628	16	3
32	Mădălina Amăistroaie	Romania	627	16	7
33	Gülnaz Coşkun	Turkey	624	21	11
34	Urška Čavič	Slovenia	619	12	1
35	Reena Pärnat	Estonia	618	16	4
36	Ana Umer	Slovenia	617	20	3
37	Elena Petrou	Cyprus	616	18	4
38	Marín Hilmarsdóttir	Iceland	613	10	3
39	Laura Amato	Switzerland	611	11	6
40	Dobromira Danailova	Bulgaria	606	15	4
41	Charlotte Destrooper	Belgium	602	12	3
42	Paulina Ramanauskaitė	Lithuania	600	11	4
43	Nanna Jakobsen	Denmark	597	14	4
44	Wioleta Myszor	Poland	588	20	12
45	Emma Louise Davis	Ireland	587	10	1
46	Ida-Lotta Lassila	Finland	557	6	2

== Elimination rounds ==
=== Section 1 ===
1/32 finals
33	Coşkun (TUR)	6	26	26	27	26
32	Amăistroaie (ROU)	2	27	22	23	25
41	Destrooper (BEL)	2	23	28	24	23
24	Degn (DEN)	6	25	26	26	28
25	Köse (TUR)	4	23	28	25	26	24
40	Danailova (BUL)	6	24	27	26	26	24

1/16 finals
1	Pavlova (UKR)	6^{10}	24	27	28	26	25
33	Coşkun (TUR)	5^{9}	26	27	25	27	21
17	Baránková (SVK)	4	27	30	25	26	26
16	Pitman (GBR)	6	27	25	27	26	29
9	Barbelin (FRA)	4	25	23	28	26	28
24	Degn (DEN)	6	26	26	28	25	28
40	Danailova (BUL)	5^{8}	28	29	23	26	27
8	Schwarz (GER)	6^{9}	27	29	27	27	25

1/8 finals
1	Pavlova (UKR)	6^{9+}	28	29	28	25	30
16	Pitman (GBR)	5^{9}	29	27	28	27	24
24	Degn (DEN)	7	28	23	28	25	30
8	Schwarz (GER)	3	25	28	26	25	27

Quarterfinals
1	Pavlova (UKR)	7	24	27	28	27	27
24	Degn (DEN)	3	28	26	28	23	25

=== Section 2 ===
1/32 finals
37	Petrou (CYP)	w/o
28	Sagoo (GBR)
21	Schloesser (NED)	7	26	26	29	29
44	Myszor (POL)	1	26	22	24	23
45	Davis (IRL)	0	22	23	24
20	Straka (AUT)	6	28	27	27
29	Pintarič (SLO)	2	22	26	25	27
36	Umer (SLO)	6	26	26	26	27

1/16 finals
5	Horáčková (CZE)	7	28	27	28	26	30
37	Petrou (CYP)	3	24	27	23	29	22
21	Schloesser (NED)	4	27	29	28	27	27
12	Boari (ITA)	6	28	29	26	30	27
13	Adiceom (FRA)	6	26	24	28	29
20	Straka (AUT)	2	26	24	21	25
36	Umer (SLO)	0	26	23	19
4	Canales (ESP)	6	28	29	28

1/8 finals
5	Horáčková (CZE)	6	28	30	28
12	Boari (ITA)	0	26	26	25
13	Adiceom (FRA)	2	25	28	26	28
4	Canales (ESP)	6	28	28	26	29

Quarterfinals
5	Horáčková (CZE)	4	26	27	25	29	26
4	Canales (ESP)	6	26	27	29	27	29

=== Section 3 ===
1/32 finals
35	Pärnat (EST)	2	21	27	25	23
30	Leśniak (POL)	6	22	26	27	27
19	Başaran (TUR)	4	25	25	27	26	23
46	Lassila (FIN)	6	25	22	28	26	24
43	Jakobsen (DEN)	4	27	29	22	25	24
22	Śmiałkowska (POL)	6	26	27	24	28	28
27	Putkaradze (GEO)	7	28	27	28	24	27
38	Hilmarsdóttir (ISL)	3	20	28	25	24	26

1/16 finals
3	Kroppen (GER)	5^{8}	26	28	26	27	26
30	Leśniak (POL)	6^{9}	24	26	29	27	28
46	Lassila (FIN)	2	27	24	25	28
14	Rebagliati (ITA)	6	27	30	27	28
11	Mîrca (MDA)	0	25	25	22
22	Śmiałkowska (POL)	6	26	27	28
27	Putkaradze (GEO)	4	24	28	28	22	24
6	Andreoli (ITA)	6	24	26	28	28	27

1/8 finals
30	Leśniak (POL)	1	23	25	26	27
14	Rebagliati (ITA)	7	25	29	26	29
22	Śmiałkowska (POL)	7	26	23	25	25	25
6	Andreoli (ITA)	3	21	22	26	25	24

Quarterfinals
14	Rebagliati (ITA)	6	24	28	26	26	26
22	Śmiałkowska (POL)	4	29	25	23	27	25

=== Section 4 ===
1/32 finals
39	Amato (SUI)	0	25	25	23
26	Papadopoulou (GRE)	6	26	27	25
23	Ramazanova (AZE)	5^{8}	22	27	25	25	26
42	Ramanauskaitė (LTU)	6^{10}	25	27	27	20	17
31	Moshe (ISR)	4	25	25	26	29	23
34	Čavič (SLO)	6	26	23	27	28	27

1/16 finals
7	Bauer (GER)	2	23	25	27	26
26	Papadopoulou (GRE)	6	25	26	26	28
42	Ramanauskaitė (LTU)	4	22	27	25	27	21
10	Lopez (FRA)	6	28	26	30	25	30
15	Bjerendal (SWE)	6	25	27	29
18	Andersen (DEN)	0	24	24	27
34	Čavič (SLO)	0	26	26	27
2	Healey (GBR)	6	27	28	29

1/8 finals
26	Papadopoulou (GRE)	3	27	27	26	27	26
10	Lopez (FRA)	7	26	27	27	28	27
15	Bjerendal (SWE)	1	26	25	25	25
2	Healey (GBR)	7	28	25	27	26

Quarterfinals
10	Lopez (FRA)	3	27	26	28	28	27
2	Healey (GBR)	7	30	25	28	29	28

=== Finals ===
Semifinals
1	Anastasia Pavlova (UKR)	5^{10,8}	25	27	28	29	29
4	Elia Canales (ESP)	6^{10,9}	28	23	29	27	29
14	Chiara Rebagliati (ITA)	0	26	24	29
2	Penny Healey (GBR)	6	27	28	30

Gold medal match
4	Elia Canales (ESP)	2	26	29	26	29
2	Penny Healey (GBR)	6	26	30	28	29
Bronze medal match
1	Anastasia Pavlova (UKR)	4	28	25	27	28	26
14	Chiara Rebagliati (ITA)	6	27	28	28	24	27
