= 2022 European Archery Championships – Women's individual recurve =

Archery competition

Women's individual recurve at the 2022 European Archery Championships
- Location: Munich, Germany
- Dates: 6–12 June
- Competitors: 74 from 30 nations

Medalists
gold medal	Gülnaz Büşranur Coşkun	Turkey
silver medal	Michelle Kroppen	Germany
bronze medal	Katharina Bauer	Germany

2022 European Archery Championships
Men	Recurve	Compound
Women	Recurve	Compound
Team	Men's recurve	Men's compound
Team	Women's recurve	Women's compound
Mixed team	Recurve	Compound

The women's individual recurve competition at the 2022 European Archery Championships took place from 6 to 12 June in Munich, Germany.

== Qualification round ==
Results after 72 arrows.

Rank	Name	Nation	Score	10+X	X
1	Michelle Kroppen	Germany	675	32	10
2	Penny Healey	Great Britain	667	30	14
3	Ezgi Başaran	Turkey	664	27	11
4	Leyre Fernández	Spain	659	28	8
5	Katharina Bauer	Germany	659	23	4
6	Gülnaz Büşranur Coşkun	Turkey	658	26	12
7	Charline Schwarz	Germany	656	26	7
8	Elia Canales	Spain	656	23	8
9	Randi Degn	Denmark	655	27	13
10	Tatiana Andreoli	Italy	654	27	2
11	Anastasia Pavlova	Ukraine	653	24	8
12	Alexandra Mîrca	Moldova	651	27	11
13	Lucilla Boari	Italy	651	25	9
14	Jaspreet Sagoo	Great Britain	651	23	8
15	Veronika Marchenko	Ukraine	651	22	7
16	Gabriela Schloesser	Netherlands	647	20	10
17	Bryony Pitman	Great Britain	646	22	7
18	Solomiya Hnyp	Ukraine	645	17	5
19	Evangelia Psarra	Greece	644	23	5
20	Audrey Adiceom	France	644	19	6
21	Denisa Baránková	Slovakia	643	19	5
22	Laura van der Winkel	Netherlands	642	24	8
23	Reena Pärnat	Estonia	642	20	1
24	Lisa Barbelin	France	641	25	10
25	Mélodie Richard	France	641	22	7
26	Tsiko Phutkaradze	Georgia	641	19	6
27	Elisabetta Mijno	Italy	640	20	3
28	Alexandra Longová	Slovakia	640	16	5
29	Yasemin Anagöz	Turkey	639	17	6
30	Ana Umer	Slovenia	636	17	5
31	Marie Horáčková	Czech Republic	635	18	6
32	Urška Čavič	Slovenia	635	18	4
33	Kirstine Andersen	Denmark	634	19	4
34	Maria Nasoula	Greece	633	22	6
35	Anatoli Martha Gkorila	Greece	633	19	7
36	Wioleta Myszor	Poland	633	17	1
37	Beatrice Miklos	Romania	631	20	8
38	Kamila Napłoszek	Poland	631	18	9
39	Elisabeth Straka	Austria	626	12	2
40	Sandra Cebrián	Spain	625	18	5
41	Quinty Roeffen	Netherlands	622	16	7
42	Natalia Leśniak	Poland	620	18	1
43	Paulina Ramanauskaitė	Lithuania	618	17	6
44	Julie Hellemans	Belgium	618	17	4
45	Liliana Licari	Switzerland	617	16	2
46	Dobromira Danailova	Bulgaria	613	22	7
47	Yaylagul Ramazanova	Azerbaijan	613	19	8
48	Simone Gerster	Switzerland	612	14	7
49	Triinu Lilienthal	Estonia	610	13	0
50	Ida-Lotta Lassila	Finland	609	16	9
51	Nanna Jakobsen	Denmark	609	11	5
52	Juliana Semionova	Lithuania	600	14	8
53	Taru Kuoppa	Finland	600	14	5
54	Jeļena Kononova	Latvia	600	7	0
55	Roisin Mooney	Ireland	598	12	6
56	Nina Corel	Slovenia	598	12	3
57	Gejane Bottinelli	Finland	596	14	6
58	Emma Louise Davis	Ireland	596	12	3
59	Klára Grapová	Czech Republic	595	10	3
60	Elena Bendíková	Slovakia	595	10	1
61	Bessi Kasak	Estonia	590	10	2
62	Franziska Langhammer	Switzerland	589	11	3
63	Erika Jangnäs	Sweden	588	13	2
64	Marín Aníta Hilmarsdóttir	Iceland	586	10	0
65	Rebekah Tipping	Ireland	570	9	2
66	Svetlana Sminova	Azerbaijan	566	11	1
67	Jindřiška Vaněčková	Czech Republic	563	12	7
68	Inga Timinskienė	Lithuania	562	8	2
69	Ira Arjevanidze	Georgia	561	10	3
70	Katarina Vranjković	Serbia	555	9	2
71	Valgerður Einarsdóttir Hjaltested	Iceland	553	13	3
72	Nazrin Zamanova	Azerbaijan	543	1	0
73	Teona Kutaladze	Georgia	542	8	0
74	Astrid Daxböck	Iceland	407	6	2

== Final round ==
Quarterfinals
1	(Germany) Michelle Kroppen	6	30	28	27	29
8	(Spain) Elia Canales	2	26	29	25	25
5	(Germany) Katharina Bauer	6	27	28	26	28
20	(France) Audrey Adiceom	2	25	28	26	27
39	(Austria) Elisabeth Straka	6	26	26	27	26	27
15	(Ukraine) Veronika Marchenko	4	29	26	26	25	27
11	(United Kingdom) Jaspreet Sagoo	2	28	25	25	25
6	(Turkey) Gülnaz Büşranur Coşkun	6	26	27	28	27

Semifinals
1	(Germany) Michelle Kroppen	6	27	28	28	29	29
5	(Germany) Katharina Bauer	4	28	27	28	27	29
39	(Austria) Elisabeth Straka	2	28	25	25	25
6	(Turkey) Gülnaz Büşranur Coşkun	6	26	27	28	27

Finals
1	(Germany) Michelle Kroppen	2	28	27	24	27
6	(Turkey) Gülnaz Büşranur Coşkun	6	28	27	26	29
Third place
5	(Germany) Katharina Bauer	6	25	28	27
39	(Austria) Elisabeth Straka	0	22	23	26

== Elimination round ==
=== Section 1 ===
1/48 finals
1	(Germany) Michelle Kroppen
Bye
33	(Denmark) Kirstine Andersen
Bye
Bye
32	(Slovenia) Urška Čavič
17	(United Kingdom) Bryony Pitman
Bye
65	(Republic of Ireland) Rebekah Tipping	2	17	27	21	24
48	(Switzerland) Simone Gerster	6	26	26	26	26
49	(Estonia) Triinu Lilienthal	6	24	22	25	29
64	(Iceland) Marín Aníta Hilmarsdóttir	2	21	23	21	22
Bye
16	(Netherlands) Gabriela Schloesser

1/24 finals
1	(Germany) Michelle Kroppen
Bye
33	(Denmark) Kirstine Andersen	6	25	26	29	23	28
32	(Slovenia) Urška Čavič	4	28	24	26	29	24
17	(United Kingdom) Bryony Pitman	7	28	27	27	26	28
48	(Switzerland) Simone Gerster	3	28	27	26	26	21
49	(Estonia) Triinu Lilienthal	1	24	27	26	25
16	(Netherlands) Gabriela Schloesser	7	29	29	26	26

1/16 finals
1	(Germany) Michelle Kroppen	6	27	27	28
33	(Denmark) Kirstine Andersen	0	26	25	23
17	(United Kingdom) Bryony Pitman	0	22	23	25
16	(Netherlands) Gabriela Schloesser	6	24	28	26

1/8 finals
1	(Germany) Michelle Kroppen	6	28	27	26	28	28
16	(Netherlands) Gabriela Schloesser	4	29	26	28	27	26

=== Section 2 ===
1/48 finals
9	(Denmark) Randi Degn
Bye
57	(Finland) Gejane Bottinelli	4	26	24	29	20	8
56	(Slovenia) Nina Corel	6	26	24	24	26	27
41	(Netherlands) Quinty Roeffen	7	8	24	25	27	24
72	(Azerbaijan) Nazrin Zamanova	3	27	20	25	22	22
Bye
24	(France) Lisa Barbelin
25	(France) Mélodie Richard
Bye
73	(Georgia (country)) Teona Kutaladze	0	21	25	20
40	(Spain) Sandra Cebrián	6	24	27	26
Bye
8	(Spain) Elia Canales

1/24 finals
9	(Denmark) Randi Degn	7	28	28	28	29
56	(Slovenia) Nina Corel	1	28	25	24	25
41	(Netherlands) Quinty Roeffen	0	27	25	25
24	(France) Lisa Barbelin	6	30	29	30
25	(France) Mélodie Richard	6	27	27	14	27
40	(Spain) Sandra Cebrián	2	25	24	27	26
Bye
8	(Spain) Elia Canales

1/16 finals
9	(Denmark) Randi Degn	6	26	25	26	28	26
24	(France) Lisa Barbelin	5	24	25	29	26	28
25	(France) Mélodie Richard	0	21	27	15
8	(Spain) Elia Canales	6	28	28	23

1/8 finals
9	(Denmark) Randi Degn	0	24	22	24
8	(Spain) Elia Canales	6	29	26	27

=== Section 3 ===
1/48 finals
5	(Germany) Katharina Bauer
Bye
37	(Romania) Beatrice Miklos
Bye
Bye
28	(Slovakia) Alexandra Longová
21	(Slovakia) Denisa Baránková
Bye
69	(Georgia (country)) Ira Arjevanidze	3	28	24	24	25	24
44	(Belgium) Julie Hellemans	7	28	25	24	25	25
53	(Finland) Taru Kuoppa	5	26	27	27	26	20
60	(Slovakia) Elena Bendíková	6	24	27	29	24	26
Bye
12	(Moldova) Alexandra Mîrca

1/24 finals
5	(Germany) Katharina Bauer
Bye
37	(Romania) Beatrice Miklos	0	25	24	25
28	(Slovakia) Alexandra Longová	6	26	27	29
21	(Slovakia) Denisa Baránková	7	28	28	23	27	26
44	(Belgium) Julie Hellemans	3	27	28	25	23	19
60	(Slovakia) Elena Bendíková	2	26	25	27	26
12	(Moldova) Alexandra Mîrca	6	25	26	28	28

1/16 finals
5	(Germany) Katharina Bauer	6	27	27	26	29	27
28	(Slovakia) Alexandra Longová	5	28	29	26	25	24
21	(Slovakia) Denisa Baránková	3	26	27	25	26	24
12	(Moldova) Alexandra Mîrca	6	27	25	25	29	27

1/8 finals
5	(Germany) Katharina Bauer	7	27	28	26	25	28
12	(Moldova) Alexandra Mîrca	3	29	26	25	25	27

=== Section 4 ===
1/48 finals
13	(Italy) Lucilla Boari
Bye
61	(Estonia) Bessi Kasak	6	28	28	23	24	23
52	(Lithuania) Juliana Semionova	4	25	26	29	26	19
45	(Switzerland) Liliana Licari	7	26	26	25	27	28
68	(Lithuania) Inga Timinskienė	3	22	26	27	20	18
Bye
20	(France) Audrey Adiceom
29	(Turkey) Yasemin Anagöz
Bye
Bye
36	(Poland) Wioleta Myszor
Bye
4	(Spain) Leyre Fernández

1/24 finals
13	(Italy) Lucilla Boari	5	25	25	29	26	25
61	(Estonia) Bessi Kasak	6	25	26	26	27	17
45	(Switzerland) Liliana Licari	0	25	24	25
20	(France) Audrey Adiceom	6	27	27	29
29	(Turkey) Yasemin Anagöz	2	28	25	25	23
36	(Poland) Wioleta Myszor	6	27	26	26	24
Bye
4	(Spain) Leyre Fernández

1/16 finals
61	(Estonia) Bessi Kasak	0	26	27	22
20	(France) Audrey Adiceom	6	27	28	27
36	(Poland) Wioleta Myszor	4	25	27	26	17	24
4	(Spain) Leyre Fernández	6	25	25	26	23	27

1/8 finals
20	(France) Audrey Adiceom	6	27	29	28	29
4	(Spain) Leyre Fernández	2	27	28	27	29

=== Section 5 ===
1/48 finals
3	(Turkey) Ezgi Başaran
Bye
35	(Greece) Anatoli Martha Gkorila
Bye
Bye
30	(Slovenia) Ana Umer
19	(Greece) Evangelia Psarra
Bye
67	(Czech Republic) Jindřiška Vaněčková	4	25	25	24	22	25
46	(Bulgaria) Dobromira Danailova	6	28	18	23	26	26
51	(Denmark) Nanna Jakobsen	0	23	22	23
62	(Switzerland) Franziska Langhammer	6	26	23	24
Bye
14	(United Kingdom) Jaspreet Sagoo

1/24 finals
3	(Turkey) Ezgi Başaran
Bye
35	(Greece) Anatoli Martha Gkorila	0	27	27	26
30	(Slovenia) Ana Umer	6	28	29	27
19	(Greece) Evangelia Psarra	6	27	29	28
46	(Bulgaria) Dobromira Danailova	0	21	27	26
62	(Switzerland) Franziska Langhammer	0	25	25	24
14	(United Kingdom) Jaspreet Sagoo	6	26	27	28

1/16 finals
3	(Turkey) Ezgi Başaran	7	28	27	28	27
30	(Slovenia) Ana Umer	1	28	27	25	25
19	(Greece) Evangelia Psarra	3	25	26	24	25	22
14	(United Kingdom) Jaspreet Sagoo	7	25	23	28	29	29

1/8 finals
3	(Turkey) Ezgi Başaran	3	23	22	27	26	25
14	(United Kingdom) Jaspreet Sagoo	7	27	24	27	25	26

=== Section 6 ===
1/48 finals
11	(Ukraine) Anastasia Pavlova
Bye
59	(Czech Republic) Klára Grapová	6	20	27	27	23
54	(Latvia) Jeļena Kononova	2	'23	22	22	22
43	(Lithuania) Paulina Ramanauskaitė	3	25	22	26	24	24
70	(Serbia) Katarina Vranjković	7	25	26	21	25	27
Bye
22	(Netherlands) Laura van der Winkel
27	(Italy) Elisabetta Mijno
Bye
Bye
38	(Poland) Kamila Napłoszek
Bye
6	(Turkey) Gülnaz Büşranur Coşkun

1/24 finals
11	(Ukraine) Anastasia Pavlova	6	29	27	25
59	(Slovakia) Klára Grapová	0	28	26	23
70	(Serbia) Katarina Vranjković	4	26	25	26	25	25
22	(Netherlands) Laura van der Winkel	6	26	24	28	28	25
27	(Italy) Elisabetta Mijno	7	28	27	28	25
38	(Poland) Kamila Napłoszek	1	28	22	16	24
Bye
6	(Turkey) Gülnaz Büşranur Coşkun

1/16 finals
11	(Ukraine) Anastasia Pavlova	6	25	27	28	29
22	(Netherlands) Laura van der Winkel	2	27	26	25	27
27	(Italy) Elisabetta Mijno	2	21	23	29	26
6	(Turkey) Gülnaz Büşranur Coşkun	6	26	27	24	29

1/8 finals
11	(Ukraine) Anastasia Pavlova	5	28	26	28	28	26
6	(Turkey) Gülnaz Büşranur Coşkun	6	28	28	28	27	26

=== Section 7 ===
1/48 finals
7	(Germany) Charline Schwarz
Bye
39	(Austria) Elisabeth Straka	6	27	24	27
74	(Iceland) Astrid Daxböck	0	14	20	16
Bye
26	(Georgia (country)) Tsiko Phutkaradze
23	(Estonia) Reena Pärnat
Bye
71	(Iceland) Valgerður Einarsdóttir Hjaltested	5	23	21	27	20	26
42	(Poland) Natalia Leśniak	6	23	27	25	29	25
55	(Republic of Ireland) Roisin Mooney	6	27	23	27	26
58	(Republic of Ireland) Emma Louise Davis	2	22	25	25	21
Bye
10	(Italy) Tatiana Andreoli

1/24 finals
7	(Germany) Charline Schwarz
Bye
39	(Austria) Elisabeth Straka	6	27	26	27	25
26	(Georgia (country)) Tsiko Phutkaradze	2	26	27	25	23
23	(Estonia) Reena Pärnat	6	27	27	27
42	(Poland) Natalia Leśniak	0	26	26	26
55	(Republic of Ireland) Roisin Mooney	0	25	25	23
10	(Italy) Tatiana Andreoli	6	27	27	28

1/16 finals
7	(Germany) Charline Schwarz	5	25	30	26	28	25
39	(Austria) Elisabeth Straka	6	24	23	26	29	27
23	(Estonia) Reena Pärnat	4	23	28	24	27	23
10	(Italy) Tatiana Andreoli	6	26	27	29	26	28

1/8 finals
39	(Austria) Elisabeth Straka	6	28	29	28	27	25
10	(Italy) Tatiana Andreoli	4	28	25	28	28	24

=== Section 8 ===
1/48 finals
15	(Ukraine) Veronika Marchenko
Bye
63	(Sweden) Erika Jangnäs	2	27	23	21	23	27
50	(Finland) Ida-Lotta Lassila	6	27	25	21	28
47	(Azerbaijan) Yaylagul Ramazanova	6	22	24	27	26	27
66	(Azerbaijan) Svetlana Sminova	4	23	26	20	25	26
Bye
18	(Ukraine) Solomiya Hnyp
31	(Czech Republic) Marie Horáčková
Bye
Bye
34	(Greece) Maria Nasoula
Bye
2	(United Kingdom) Penny Healey

1/24 finals
15	(Ukraine) Veronika Marchenko	7	26	24	29	28
50	(Finland) Ida-Lotta Lassila	1	28	25	25	23
47	(Azerbaijan) Yaylagul Ramazanova	4	25	30	28	24	22
18	(Ukraine) Solomiya Hnyp	6	27	26	27	28	28
31	(Czech Republic) Marie Horáčková	2	27	24	21	26
34	(Greece) Maria Nasoula	6	25	30	26	28
Bye
2	(United Kingdom) Penny Healey

1/16 finals
15	(Ukraine) Veronika Marchenko	6	26	24	29	28
18	(Ukraine) Solomiya Hnyp	2	25	24	27	28
34	(Greece) Maria Nasoula	2	22	28	24	25
2	(United Kingdom) Penny Healey	6	26	27	26	30

1/8 finals
15	(Ukraine) Veronika Marchenko	7	28	26	26	28	27
3	(United Kingdom) Penny Healey	3	28	25	29	27	26
