= 2022 European Archery Championships – Mixed team recurve =

Archery competition

Mixed Team Recurve at the 2022 European Archery Championships
- Location: Munich, Germany
- Dates: 6–12 June
- Competitors: 58 from 29 nations
- Teams: 29

Medalists
gold medal	Gabriela Schloesser; Rick van der Ven	Netherlands
silver medal	Florian Unruh; Michelle Kroppen	Germany
bronze medal	Tatiana Andreoli; Mauro Nespoli	Italy

2022 European Archery Championships
Men	Recurve	Compound
Women	Recurve	Compound
Team	Men's recurve	Men's compound
Team	Women's recurve	Women's compound
Mixed team	Recurve	Compound

The mixed team recurve competition at the 2022 European Archery Championships took place from 6 to 12 June in Munich, Germany.

== Qualification round ==
Results after 144 arrows.

Rank	Nation	Name	Score	10+X	X
1	Germany	Florian Unruh; Michelle Kroppen	1362	72	23
2	Turkey	Ezgi Başaran; Mete Gazoz	1343	65	26
3	Spain	Leyre Fernández; Miguel Alvariño	1340	69	22
4	Italy	Tatiana Andreoli; Mauro Nespoli	1330	63	13
5	Great Britain	Penny Healey; Patrick Huston	1324	59	23
6	Ukraine	Anastasia Pavlova; Oleksii Hunbin	1320	54	20
7	Netherlands	Gabriela Schloesser; Rick van der Ven	1311	46	19
8	Moldova	Alexandra Mîrca; Dan Olaru	1306	53	18
9	Slovenia	Ana Umer; Den Habjan Malavašič	1306	52	17
10	France	Audrey Adiceom; Jean-Charles Valladont	1304	43	14
11	Slovakia	Denisa Baránková; Juraj Duchoň	1296	44	16
12	Denmark	Randi Degn; Eli Bæk	1293	50	22
13	Czech Republic	Marie Horáčková; Adam Li	1288	40	12
14	Moldova	Alexandra Mîrca; Dan Olaru	1265	39	12
15	Belgium	Julie Hellemans; Jarno De Smedt	1287	41	13
16	Poland	Wioleta Myszor; Kacper Sierakowski	1287	41	8
17	Austria	Elisabeth Straka; Andreas Gstöttner	1286	34	3
18	Switzerland	Liliana Licari; Kéziah Chabin	1279	45	9
19	Estonia	Reena Pärnat; Märt Oona	1269	42	7
20	Georgia	Tsiko Phutkaradze; Lasha Pkhakadze	1267	38	13
21	Finland	Ida-Lotta Lassila; Antti Tekoniemi	1266	41	17
22	Lithuania	Paulina Ramanauskaitė; Modestas Šliauteris	1264	37	10
23	Sweden	Erika Jangnäs; Jonas Andersson	1263	48	11
24	Bulgaria	Dobromira Danailova; Ivan Banchev	1256	48	13
25	Azerbaijan	Yaylagul Ramazanova; Mahammadali Aliyev	1255	38	15
26	Latvia	Jeļena Kononova; Jānis Bružis	1218	27	8
27	Ireland	Roisin Mooney; Adam Taylor	1212	25	8
28	Serbia	Katarina Vranjković; Mihajlo Stefanović	1173	24	7
29	Iceland	Marín Anítu Hilmarsdóttir; Haraldur Gustafsson	1126	20	3

== Final round ==
Semifinals
1	Germany	5	37	37	38
4	Italy	1	35	37	36
6	Ukraine	0	35	36	37
7	Netherlands	6	38	38	39

Finals
1	Germany	3	33	38	36	38
7	Netherlands	5	37	39	34	38
Third place
4	Italy	6	33	39	36	37
6	Ukraine	2	37	38	34	34

== Elimination round ==
=== Section 1 ===
1/12 finals
1	Germany
Bye
17	Austria	5	35	37	37	36	20
16	Poland	4	37	31	32	37	17
9	Slovenia	2	39	35	36	34
24	Bulgaria	6	36	36	38	37
Bye
8	Moldova
5	Great Britain
Bye
21	Finland	6	33	35	40
12	Romania	2	31	32	35
13	Denmark	5	38	36	35	39
20	Georgia	3	32	37	35	36
Bye
4	Italy

1/8 finals
1	Germany	6	39	35	35
17	Austria	0	36	32	32
24	Bulgaria	5	33	39	31	37	18
8	Moldova	4	36	36	37	36	16
5	Great Britain	6	35	36	39
21	Finland	0	33	33	29
13	Denmark	2	39	34	34	37
4	Italy	6	36	38	36	38

Quarterfinals
1	Germany	6	37	37	40
24	Bulgaria	0	35	36	36
5	United Kingdom	3	39	36	37	36
4	Italy	5	39	38	34	37

Semifinals
1	Germany	5	37	37	38
4	Italy	1	35	37	36

=== Section 2 ===
1/12 finals
3	Spain
Bye
19	Estonia	5	38	32	34
14	Czech Republic	1	34	32	31
11	Slovakia	5	38	35	38
22	Lithuania	1	32	34	38
Bye
6	Ukraine
7	Netherlands
Bye
23	Sweden	4	36	37	37	34	18
10	France	5	36	39	34	34	19
15	Belgium	4	26	36	33	38	18
18	Switzerland	5	35	36	33	37	19
Bye
2	Turkey

1/8 finals
3	Spain	6	37	36	37	36
19	Estonia	2	37	32	37	34
11	Slovakia	3	38	36	36	36
6	Ukraine	5	35	38	37	36
7	Netherlands	6	34	38	38
10	France	0	29	37	34
18	Switzerland	5	38	37	37
2	Turkey	1	35	37	36

Quarterfinals
3	Spain	1	34	35	33
6	Ukraine	5	36	35	38
7	Netherlands	5	35	38	34	37
18	Switzerland	3	37	36	34	35

Semifinals
6	Ukraine	0	35	36	37
7	Netherlands	6	38	38	39
