= 2022 European Archery Championships – Women's team recurve =

Archery competition

Women's Team Recurve at the 2022 European Archery Championships
- Location: Munich, Germany
- Dates: 6–12 June
- Competitors: 66 from 22 nations
- Teams: 22

Medalists
gold medal	Michelle Kroppen; Katharina Bauer; Charline Schwarz	Germany
silver medal	Ezgi Başaran; Gülnaz Büşranur Coşkun; Yasemin Anagöz	Turkey
bronze medal	Ana Umer; Urška Čavič; Nina Corel	Slovenia

2022 European Archery Championships
Men	Recurve	Compound
Women	Recurve	Compound
Team	Men's recurve	Men's compound
Team	Women's recurve	Women's compound
Mixed team	Recurve	Compound

The women's team recurve competition at the 2022 European Archery Championships took place from 6 to 12 June in Munich, Germany.

== Qualification round ==
Results after 216 arrows.

Rank	Nation	Name	Score	10+X	X
1	Germany	Michelle Kroppen; Katharina Bauer; Charline Schwarz	1990	81	21
2	Great Britain	Penny Healey; Jaspreet Sagoo; Bryony Pitman	1964	75	29
3	Turkey	Ezgi Başaran; Gülnaz Büşranur Coşkun; Yasemin Anagöz	1961	70	29
4	Ukraine	Anastasia Pavlova; Veronika Marchenko; Solomiya Hnyp	1949	63	20
5	Italy	Tatiana Andreoli; Lucilla Boari; Elisabetta Mijno	1945	72	14
6	Spain	Leyre Fernández; Elia Canales; Sandra Cebrián	1940	69	21
7	France	Audrey Adiceom; Lisa Barbelin; Mélodie Richard	1926	66	23
8	Netherlands	Gabriela Schloesser; Laura van der Winkel; Quinty Roeffen	1911	60	25
9	Greece	Maria Nasoula; Anatoli Martha Gkorila; Evangelia Psarra	1910	64	18
10	Denmark	Kirstine Andersen; Nanna Jakobsen; Randi Degn	1898	57	22
11	Poland	Wioleta Myszor; Kamila Napłoszek; Natalia Leśniak	1884	53	11
12	Slovakia	Elena Bendíková; Denisa Baránková; Alexandra Longová	1878	45	11
13	Slovenia	Ana Umer; Urška Čavič; Nina Corel	1869	47	12
14	Estonia	Bessi Kasak; Reena Pärnat; Triinu Lilienthal	1842	43	6
15	Switzerland	Franziska Langhammer; Liliana Licari; Simone Gerster	1818	41	12
16	Finland	Ida-Lotta Lassila; Taru Kuoppa; Gejane Bottinelli	1805	44	20
17	Czech Republic	Klára Grapová; Jindřiška Vaněčková; Marie Horáčková	1793	40	16
18	Lithuania	Paulina Ramanauskaitė; Juliana Semionova; Inga Timinskienė	1780	39	16
19	Ireland	Roisin Mooney; Emma Louise Davis; Rebekah Tipping	1764	33	11
20	Georgia	Ira Arjevanidze; Teona Kutaladze; Tsiko Phutkaradze	1744	37	9
21	Azerbaijan	Yaylagul Ramazanova; Svetlana Sminova; Nazrin Zamanova	1722	31	9
22	Iceland	Valgerður Einarsdóttir Hjaltested; Astrid Daxböck; Marín Aníta Hilmarsdóttir	1546	29	5

== Final round ==
Semifinals
1	Germany	5	54	57	57
13	Slovenia	1	54	53	54
3	Turkey	5	51	54	54
10	Denmark	1	51	53	51

Finals
1	Germany	5	55	56	50	52	26
3	Turkey	4	47	46	53	53	23
Third place
13	Slovenia	5	48	52	53	48
10	Denmark	3	44	49	55	48

== Elimination round ==
=== Section 1 ===
1/12 finals
1	Germany
Bye
17	Czech Republic	4	47	46	47	53	21
16	Finland	5	46	49	51	47	28
9	Greece
Bye
Bye
8	Netherlands
5	Italy
Bye
21	Azerbaijan	0	44	49	49
12	Slovakia	6	51	52	52
13	Slovenia	6	52	56	53
20	Georgia	0	42	45	42
Bye
4	Ukraine

1/8 finals
1	Germany	6	58	53	56
16	Finland	0	49	47	45
9	Greece	6	51	49	51
8	Netherlands	0	50	43	48
5	Italy	5	52	48	47	55
12	Slovakia	3	52	40	51	51
13	Slovenia	6	53	47	51
4	Ukraine	0	45	44	48

Quarterfinals
1	Germany	6	54	55	57
9	Greece	0	50	49	42
5	Italy	2	52	55	50	50
13	Slovenia	6	55	54	55	51

Semifinals
1	Germany	5	54	57	57
13	Slovenia	1	54	53	54

=== Section 2 ===
1/12 finals
3	Turkey
Bye
19	Ireland	0	48	46	46
14	Estonia	6	54	51	56
11	Poland	6	53	53	51
22	Iceland	0	32	36	43
Bye
6	Spain
7	France
Bye
Bye
10	Denmark
15	Switzerland	6	52	51	44	54
18	Lithuania	2	41	45	50	47
Bye
2	Great Britain

1/8 finals
3	Turkey	5	48	53	51
14	Estonia	1	48	31	34
11	Poland	2	44	47	51	46
6	Spain	6	51	45	52	53
7	France	2	53	49	46	48
10	Denmark	6	53	49	51	53
18	Switzerland	2	56	51	47	45
2	Great Britain	6	51	54	49	48

Quarterfinals
3	Turkey	6	55	54	53
6	Spain	0	42	46	51
10	Denmark	6	56	48	53	53
2	Great Britain	2	48	52	49	51

Semifinals
3	Turkey	5	51	54	54
10	Denmark	0	51	53	51
