= 2022 European Archery Championships – Men's individual recurve =

Archery competition

Men's Individual Recurve at the 2022 European Archery Championships
- Location: Munich, Germany
- Dates: 6–12 June
- Competitors: 98 from 38 nations

Medalists
| gold medal | Miguel Alvariño | Spain |
| silver medal | Florian Unruh | Germany |
| bronze medal | Mete Gazoz | Turkey |

2022 European Archery Championships
| Men | Recurve | Compound |
| Women | Recurve | Compound |
| Team | Men's recurve | Men's compound |
| Team | Women's recurve | Women's compound |
| Mixed team | Recurve | Compound |

The men's individual recurve competition at the 2022 European Archery Championships took place from 6 to 12 June in Munich, Germany.

== Qualification round ==
Results after 72 arrows.

| Rank | Name | Nation | Score | 10+X | X |
|---|---|---|---|---|---|
| 1 | Florian Unruh | Germany | 687 | 40 | 13 |
| 2 | Miguel Alvariño | Spain | 681 | 41 | 14 |
| 3 | Daniel Castro | Spain | 680 | 35 | 11 |
| 4 | Mete Gazoz | Turkey | 679 | 38 | 15 |
| 5 | Jonattan Vetter | Germany | 676 | 36 | 13 |
| 6 | Mauro Nespoli | Italy | 676 | 36 | 11 |
| 7 | Jonas Andersson | Sweden | 675 | 35 | 9 |
| 8 | Jeff Henckels | Luxembourg | 671 | 31 | 8 |
| 9 | Den Habjan Malavašič | Slovenia | 670 | 35 | 12 |
| 10 | Pablo Acha | Spain | 669 | 32 | 11 |
| 11 | Jarno De Smedt | Belgium | 669 | 31 | 9 |
| 12 | Oleksii Hunbin | Ukraine | 667 | 30 | 12 |
| 13 | Kaj Sjöberg | Sweden | 666 | 28 | 10 |
| 14 | Mario Țîmpu | Romania | 665 | 24 | 8 |
| 15 | Federico Musolesi | Italy | 664 | 30 | 12 |
| 16 | Rick van der Ven | Netherlands | 664 | 26 | 9 |
| 17 | Žiga Ravnikar | Slovenia | 663 | 28 | 11 |
| 18 | Alessandro Paoli | Italy | 663 | 25 | 7 |
| 19 | Kéziah Chabin | Switzerland | 662 | 29 | 7 |
| 20 | Gijs Broeksma | Netherlands | 662 | 26 | 11 |
| 21 | Nuno Carneiro | Portugal | 661 | 35 | 11 |
| 22 | Florian Faber | Switzerland | 661 | 29 | 14 |
| 23 | Samet Ak | Turkey | 661 | 23 | 4 |
| 24 | Jean-Charles Valladont | France | 660 | 24 | 8 |
| 25 | Andreas Gstöttner | Austria | 660 | 22 | 1 |
| 26 | Moritz Wieser | Germany | 659 | 22 | 6 |
| 27 | Pit Klein | Luxembourg | 658 | 29 | 7 |
| 28 | Artem Ovchynnikov | Ukraine | 658 | 24 | 10 |
| 29 | Patrick Huston | Great Britain | 657 | 29 | 9 |
| 30 | Antti Tekoniemi | Finland | 657 | 25 | 8 |
| 31 | Thomas Rufer | Switzerland | 655 | 26 | 9 |
| 32 | Dan Olaru | Moldova | 655 | 26 | 7 |
| 33 | Théo Carbonetti | Belgium | 654 | 27 | 7 |
| 34 | Kacper Sierakowski | Poland | 654 | 24 | 7 |
| 35 | Juraj Duchoň | Slovakia | 653 | 26 | 8 |
| 36 | Tom Hall | Great Britain | 653 | 26 | 5 |
| 37 | Alen Remar | Croatia | 653 | 25 | 6 |
| 38 | Adam Li | Czech Republic | 653 | 22 | 6 |
| 39 | Thomas Chirault | France | 652 | 26 | 9 |
| 40 | Ivan Kozhokar | Ukraine | 651 | 26 | 9 |
| 41 | Alex Wise | Great Britain | 650 | 25 | 6 |
| 42 | Pierre Plihon | France | 650 | 24 | 7 |
| 43 | Itay Shanny | Israel | 647 | 23 | 5 |
| 44 | Niv Frenkel | Israel | 637 | 20 | 6 |
| 45 | Lovro Černi | Croatia | 647 | 19 | 8 |
| 46 | Antti Vikström | Finland | 646 | 24 | 6 |
| 47 | Steve Wijler | Netherlands | 646 | 23 | 9 |
| 48 | Modestas Šliauteris | Lithuania | 646 | 20 | 4 |
| 49 | Ivan Banchev | Bulgaria | 643 | 26 | 6 |
| 50 | Mahammadali Aliyev | Azerbaijan | 642 | 19 | 7 |
| 51 | Michal Hlahůlek | Czech Republic | 641 | 21 | 12 |
| 52 | Eli Bæk | Denmark | 638 | 23 | 9 |
| 53 | Sergej Podkrajšek | Slovenia | 638 | 21 | 6 |
| 54 | Efe Gürkan Maraş | Turkey | 638 | 20 | 4 |
| 55 | Miłosz Chojecki | Poland | 637 | 21 | 7 |
| 56 | Oliver Staudt | Denmark | 636 | 19 | 3 |
| 57 | Ludvig Njor Henriksen | Denmark | 636 | 17 | 9 |
| 58 | Leo Sulik | Croatia | 635 | 28 | 8 |
| 59 | Constantinos Panagi | Cyprus | 635 | 28 | 8 |
| 60 | Jaromír Termer | Czech Republic | 634 | 18 | 8 |
| 61 | Marek Szafran | Poland | 633 | 20 | 8 |
| 62 | Eyal Roziner | Israel | 633 | 15 | 6 |
| 63 | Christian Zwetti | Austria | 632 | 19 | 5 |
| 64 | Miroslav Duchoň | Slovakia | 629 | 15 | 5 |
| 65 | Sander Roth | Norway | 628 | 13 | 5 |
| 66 | Märt Oona | Estonia | 627 | 22 | 6 |
| 67 | Lasha Pkhakadze | Georgia | 626 | 19 | 7 |
| 68 | Julian Schweighofer | Austria | 625 | 13 | 2 |
| 69 | Luís Gonçalves | Portugal | 624 | 21 | 11 |
| 70 | Edi Dvorani | Kosovo | 623 | 18 | 4 |
| 71 | Mátyás Balogh | Hungary | 620 | 19 | 6 |
| 72 | Tiago Matos | Portugal | 620 | 13 | 3 |
| 73 | Jānis Bružis | Latvia | 618 | 20 | 8 |
| 74 | Mihajlo Stefanović | Serbia | 618 | 15 | 5 |
| 75 | Valmir Gllareva | Kosovo | 618 | 15 | 4 |
| 76 | Dāvis Blāze | Latvia | 618 | 13 | 4 |
| 77 | Mirian Tsulukidze | Georgia | 616 | 14 | 1 |
| 78 | Adam Taylor | Ireland | 614 | 13 | 2 |
| 79 | Hans Petur Højgaard | Faroe Islands | 613 | 15 | 4 |
| 80 | Aleksandre Machavariani | Georgia | 613 | 14 | 2 |
| 81 | Gļebs Kononovs | Latvia | 608 | 17 | 6 |
| 82 | Verne Vuorinen | Finland | 608 | 12 | 7 |
| 83 | Dovydas Bagdanavičius | Lithuania | 605 | 15 | 5 |
| 84 | Ben Adriensen | Belgium | 603 | 11 | 6 |
| 85 | Sergiu Sorici | Moldova | 602 | 13 | 2 |
| 86 | Blagoy Todorov | Bulgaria | 602 | 12 | 8 |
| 87 | Jovica Velimirović | Serbia | 598 | 9 | 5 |
| 88 | Oleg Lacutco | Moldova | 597 | 9 | 3 |
| 89 | Todor Pendov | Bulgaria | 596 | 13 | 5 |
| 90 | Ondrej Franců | Slovakia | 591 | 19 | 7 |
| 91 | Hazir Asllani | Kosovo | 590 | 14 | 2 |
| 92 | Jacopo Forlani | San Marino | 587 | 10 | 3 |
| 93 | Marko Vulić | Serbia | 572 | 7 | 2 |
| 94 | Ramūnas Kašėta | Lithuania | 564 | 7 | 2 |
| 95 | Karl Kivilo | Estonia | 550 | 4 | 0 |
| 96 | Haraldur Gústafsson | Iceland | 540 | 10 | 3 |
| 97 | Oliver Ormar Ingvarsson | Iceland | 535 | 6 | 2 |
| 98 | Dagur Örn Fannarsson | Iceland | 39 | 0 | 0 |

== Final round ==
Quarterfinals
1 | (Germany) Florian Unruh | 7 | 29 | 28 | 29 | 30
40 | (Ukraine) Ivan Kozhokar | 1 | 27 | 28 | 28 | 28
5 | (Germany) Jonathan Vetter | 0 | 27 | 26 | 26
4 | (Turkey) Mete Gazoz | 6 | 30 | 28 | 28
3 | (Spain) Daniel Castro | 6 | 27 | 27 | 29 | 29 | 28
6 | (Italy) Mauro Nespoli | 4 | 26 | 28 | 29 | 27 | 26
26 | (Germany) Moritz Wieser | 0 | 27 | 26 | 25
2 | (Spain) Miguel Alvariño | 6 | 28 | 29 | 26

Semifinals
1 | (Germany) Florian Unruh | 6 | 30 | 26 | 29 | 28 | 29
4 | (Turkey) Mete Gazoz | 4 | 27 | 29 | 28 | 28 | 29
3 | (Spain) Daniel Castro | 1 | 27 | 27 | 26 | 26
2 | (Spain) Miguel Alvariño | 7 | 28 | 27 | 28 | 29

Finals
1 | (Germany) Florian Unruh | 2 | 26 | 29 | 27 | 27
2 | (Spain) Miguel Alvariño | 6 | 27 | 27 | 29 | 30
Third place
4 | (Turkey) Mete Gazoz | 6 | 29 | 26 | 28 | 27 | 27
3 | (Spain) Daniel Castro | 4 | 23 | 27 | 28 | 26 | 27

== Elimination round ==
=== Section 1 ===
1/48 finals
1 | (Germany) Florian Unruh
Bye
33 | (Belgium) Théo Carbonetti | 6 | 30 | 25 | 29 | 28
80 | (Georgia (country)) Aleksandre Machavariani | 2 | 22 | 27 | 27 | 25
81 | (Latvia) Gļebs Kononovs | 1 | 26 | 26 | 20 | 24
32 | (Moldova) Dan Olaru | 7 | 27 | 26 | 28 | 26
17 | (Slovenia) Žiga Ravnikar | 7 | 28 | 28 | 27 | 28
96 | (Iceland) Haraldur Gústafsson | 1 | 25 | 26 | 27 | 27
65 | (Norway) Sander Roth | 6 | 26 | 27 | 27 | 28 | 29
48 | (France) Modestas Šliauteris | 5 | 27 | 25 | 27 | 29 | 26
49 | (Bulgaria) Ivan Banchev | 3 | 29 | 27 | 26 | 25 | 25
64 | (Slovakia) Miroslav Duchoň | 7 | 28 | 27 | 28 | 29 | 27
97 | (Iceland) Oliver Ormar Ingvarsson | 0 | 23 | 16 | 19
16 | (Netherlands) Rick van der Ven | 6 | 27 | 28 | 30

1/24 finals
1 | (Germany) Florian Unruh
Bye
33 | (Belgium) Théo Carbonetti | 0 | 26 | 28 | 23
32 | (Moldova) Dan Olaru | 6 | 28 | 29 | 27
17 | (Slovakia) Žiga Ravnikar | 6 | 25 | 23 | 28 | 28 | 24
65 | (Norway) Sander Roth | 5 | 25 | 29 | 26 | 26 | 29
64 | (Slovakia) Miroslav Duchoň | 3 | 19 | 29 | 28 | 25 | 28
16 | (Netherlands) Rick van der Ven | 7 | 25 | 28 | 28 | 26 | 29

1/16 finals
1 | (Germany) Florian Unruh | 6 | 29 | 27 | 28 | 28 | 29
32 | (Moldova) Dan Olaru | 4 | 29 | 27 | 27 | 29 | 27
17 | (Slovakia) Žiga Ravnikar | 0 | 27 | 27 | 28
16 | (Netherlands) Rick van der Ven | 6 | 29 | 29 | 29

1/8 finals
1 | (Germany) Florian Unruh | 6 | 26 | 27 | 28 | 27 | 29
16 | (Netherlands) Rick van der Ven | 4 | 26 | 25 | 27 | 28 | 29

=== Section 2 ===
1/48 finals
9 | (Slovenia) Den Habjan Malavašič
Bye
57 | (Denmark) Ludvig Njor Henriksen | 3 | 29 | 28 | 26 | 24 | 25
56 | (Denmark) Oliver Staudt | 7 | 28 | 28 | 27 | 25 | 27
41 | (United Kingdom) Alex Wise | 3 | 27 | 26 | 26 | 29 | 25
72 | (Portugal) Tiago Matos | 7 | 27 | 27 | 27 | 28 | 27
89 | (Bulgaria) Todor Pendov | 0 | 25 | 22 | 22
24 | (France) Jean-Charles Valladont | 6 | 27 | 28 | 28
25 | (Austria) Andreas Gstöttner | 6 | 23 | 27 | 29 | 28 | 28
24 | (Moldova) Oleg Lacutco | 5 | 24 | 27 | 26 | 29 | 25
73 | (Latvia) Jānis Bružis | 0 | 24 | 27 | 27
40 | (Ukraine) Ivan Kozhokar | 6 | 30 | 28 | 30
Bye
8 | (Luxembourg) Jeff Henckels

1/24 finals
9 | (Slovenia) Den Habjan Malavašič | 7 | 28 | 29 | 28 | 26
56 | (Denmark) Oliver Staudt | 1 | 26 | 27 | 28 | 25
72 | (Portugal) Tiago Matos | 4 | 28 | 29 | 27 | 26 | 26
24 | (France) Jean-Charles Valladont | 6 | 28 | 25 | 29 | 28 | 26
25 | (Austria) Andreas Gstöttner | 3 | 27 | 26 | 28 | 30 | 27
40 | (Ukraine) Ivan Kozhokar | 7 | 28 | 29 | 27 | 30 | 28
8 | (Luxembourg) Jeff Henckels

1/16 finals
9 | (Slovenia) Den Habjan Malavašič | 4 | 27 | 27 | 25 | 29 | 25
24 | (France) Jean-Charles Valladont | 6 | 26 | 30 | 28 | 28 | 27
40 | (Ukraine) Ivan Kozhokar | 6 | 29 | 28 | 10 | 29 | 29
8 | (Luxembourg) Jeff Henckels | 4 | 28 | 30 | 28 | 28 | 28

1/8 finals
24 | (France) Jean-Charles Valladont | 4 | 29 | 22 | 28 | 29 | 27
40 | (Ukraine) Ivan Kozhokar | 6 | 29 | 28 | 28 | 25 | 29

=== Section 3 ===
1/48 finals
5 | (Germany) Jonathan Vetter
Bye
37 | (Croatia) Alen Remar | 6 | 30 | 27 | 28 | 26 | 26
76 | (Latvia) Dāvis Blāze | 5 | 28 | 27 | 27 | 27 | 28
85 | (Moldova) Sergiu Sorici | 5 | 27 | 27 | 28 | 26 | 29
28 | (Ukraine) Artem Ovchynnikov | 6 | 29 | 30 | 27 | 26 | 28
21 | (Portugal) Nuno Carneiro | 6 | 28 | 28 | 28
92 | (San Marino) Jacopo Forlani | 0 | 23 | 24 | 24
69 | (Portugal) Luís Gonçalves | 4 | 28 | 25 | 28 | 26 | 23
44 | (Israel) Niv Frenkel | 6 | 23 | 28 | 26 | 29 | 28
53 | (Slovenia) Sergej Podkrajšek | 2 | 22 | 25 | 27 | 24
60 | (Czech Republic) Jaromír Termer | 6 | 25 | 25 | 27 | 25
Bye
12 | (Ukraine) Oleksii Hunbin

1/24 finals
5 | (Germany) Jonathan Vetter
Bye
37 | (Croatia) Alen Remar | 4 | 28 | 29 | 26 | 27 | 28
28 | (Ukraine) Artem Ovchynnikov | 6 | 25 | 20 | 28 | 29 | 30
21 | (Portugal) Nuno Carneiro | 6 | 24 | 29 | 29
44 | (Israel) Niv Frenkel | 0 | 22 | 26 | 24
60 | (Czech Republic) Jaromír Termer | 6 | 25 | 27 | 29 | 28
12 | (Ukraine) Oleksii Hunbin | 2 | 29 | 25 | 27 | 27

1/16 finals
5 | (Germany) Jonathan Vetter | 6 | 29 | 30 | 27 | 29
28 | (Ukraine) Artem Ovchynnikov | 2 | 28 | 28 | 28 | 27
21 | (Portugal) Nuno Carneiro | 6 | 28 | 29 | 18 | 27
60 | (Czech Republic) Jaromír Termer | 2 | 25 | 25 | 29 | 24

1/8 finals
5 | (Germany) Jonathan Vetter | 6 | 28 | 28 | 29 | 27
21 | (Portugal) Nuno Carneiro | 2 | 28 | 26 | 28 | 27

=== Section 4 ===
1/48 finals
13 | (Sweden) Kaj Sjöberg
Bye
61 | (Poland) Marek Szafran | 7 | 28 | 29 | 28 | 28 | 28
52 | (Denmark) Eli Bæk | 3 | 25 | 17 | 29 | 28 | 25
45 | (Croatia) Lovro Černi | 3 | 27 | 28 | 28 | 24 | 27
68 | (Austria) Julian Schweighofer | 7 | 27 | 26 | 29 | 26 | 29
93 | (Serbia) Marko Vulić | 0 | 25 | 24 | 24
20 | (Netherlands) Gijs Broeksma | 6 | 27 | 29 | 27
29 | (United Kingdom) Patrick Huston | 6 | 27 | 30 | 29
84 | (Belgium) Ben Adriensen | 0 | 25 | 26 | 26
77 | (Georgia (country)) Mirian Tsulukidze | 1 | 27 | 28 | 22 | 24
36 | (United Kingdom) Tom Hall | 7 | 28 | 28 | 26 | 27
Bye
4 | (Turkey) Mete Gazoz

1/24 finals
13 | (Sweden) Kaj Sjöberg | 6 | 27 | 28 | 28
61 | (Poland) Marek Szafran | 0 | 26 | 26 | 25
68 | (Austria) Julian Schweighofer | 2 | 27 | 27 | 25 | 23
20 | (Netherlands) Gijs Broeksma | 6 | 26 | 29 | 27 | 28
29 | (United Kingdom) Patrick Huston | 6 | 29 | 29 | 28
36 | (United Kingdom) Tom Hall | 0 | 28 | 26 | 27
Bye
4 | (Turkey) Mete Gazoz

1/16 finals
13 | (Sweden) Kaj Sjöberg | 6 | 29 | 28 | 29
20 | (Netherlands) Gijs Broeksma | 0 | 27 | 27 | 26
29 | (United Kingdom) Patrick Huston | 4 | 28 | 28 | 28 | 29 | 27
4 | (Turkey) Mete Gazoz | 6 | 27 | 29 | 26 | 30 | 28

1/8 finals
13 | (Sweden) Kaj Sjöberg | 2 | 27 | 29 | 28 | 28
4 | (Turkey) Mete Gazoz | 6 | 28 | 28 | 30 | 30

=== Section 5 ===
1/48 finals
3 | (Spain) Daniel Castro
Bye
35 | (Slovakia) Juraj Duchoň | 7 | 25 | 27 | 30 | 27 | 26
78 | (Republic of Ireland) Adam Taylor | 3 | 26 | 27 | 26 | 25 | 23
83 | (Lithuania) Dovydas Bagdanavičius | 0 | 26 | 23 | 24
30 | (Finland) Antti Tekoniemi | 6 | 27 | 28 | 28
19 | (Switzerland) Kéziah Chabin | 6 | 28 | 26 | 29 | 29
94 | (Lithuania) Ramūnas Kašėta | 2 | 21 | 27 | 26 | 25
67 | (Georgia (country)) Lasha Pkhakadze | 0 | 27 | 24 | 25
46 | (Finland) Antti Vikström | 6 | 28 | 27 | 29
51 | (Czech Republic) Michal Hlahůlek | 6 | 28 | 29 | 25
62 | (Israel) Eyal Roziner | 0 | 27 | 27 | 24
Bye
14 | (Romania) Mario Țîmpu

1/24 finals
3 | (Spain) Daniel Castro
Bye
35 | (Slovakia) Juraj Duchoň | 6 | 28 | 28 | 27
30 | (Finland) Antti Tekoniemi | 0 | 26 | 26 | 26
19 | (Switzerland) Kéziah Chabin | 6 | 29 | 26 | 28 | 29
46 | (Finland) Antti Vikström | 2 | 27 | 29 | 27 | 28
51 | (Czech Republic) Michal Hlahůlek | 4 | 26 | 25 | 25 | 30 | 27
14 | (Romania) Mario Țîmpu | 6 | 26 | 28 | 29 | 26 | 27

1/16 finals
3 | (Spain) Daniel Castro | 6 | 26 | 26 | 30 | 28 | 26
35 | (Slovakia) Juraj Duchoň | 5 | 26 | 28 | 25 | 26 | 28
19 | (Switzerland) Kéziah Chabin | 7 | 28 | 28 | 29 | 27
14 | (Romania) Mario Țîmpu | 1 | 27 | 27 | 29 | 26

1/8 finals
3 | (Spain) Daniel Castro | 7 | 30 | 28 | 29 | 27 | 29
19 | (Switzerland) Kéziah Chabin | 3 | 25 | 29 | 27 | 27 | 27

=== Section 6 ===
1/48 finals
11 | (Belgium) Jarno De Smedt
Bye
59 | (Cyprus) Constantinos Panagi | 4 | 26 | 30 | 25 | 24 | 27
54 | (Turkey) Efe Gürkan Maraş | 6 | 25 | 26 | 29 | 27 | 27
43 | (Israel) Itay Shanny | 7 | 29 | 27 | 28 | 28 | 27
70 | (Kosovo) Edi Dvorani | 3 | 29 | 27 | 26 | 28 | 25
91 | (Kosovo) Hazir Asllani | 0 | 27 | 24 | 21
22 | (Switzerland) Florian Faber | 6 | 29 | 26 | 28
27 | (Luxembourg) Pit Klein | 6 | 26 | 27 | 24 | 25 | 28
86 | (Bulgaria) Blagoy Todorov | 4 | 27 | 22 | 22 | 27 | 23
75 | (Kosovo) Valmir Gllareva | 0 | 25 | 23 | 26
38 | (Czech Republic) Adam Li | 6 | 29 | 24 | 27
Bye
6 | (Italy) Mauro Nespoli

1/24 finals
11 | (Belgium) Jarno De Smedt | 6 | 30 | 29 | 26 | 27 | 30
54 | (Turkey) Efe Gürkan Maraş | 4 | 28 | 29 | 28 | 27 | 26
43 | (Israel) Itay Shanny | 0 | 26 | 27 | 27
22 | (Switzerland) Florian Faber | 6 | 28 | 28 | 28
27 | (Luxembourg) Pit Klein | 3 | 27 | 29 | 23 | 23 | 25
38 | (Czech Republic) Adam Li | 7 | 27 | 26 | 26 | 25 | 26
Bye
6 | (Italy) Mauro Nespoli

1/16 finals
11 | (Belgium) Jarno De Smedt | 7 | 28 | 28 | 28 | 27 | 28
22 | (Switzerland) Florian Faber | 3 | 27 | 25 | 28 | 28 | 26
38 | (Czech Republic) Adam Li | 4 | 28 | 27 | 29 | 26 | 27
6 | (Italy) Mauro Nespoli | 6 | 27 | 28 | 27 | 30 | 29

1/8 finals
11 | (Belgium) Jarno De Smedt | 5 | 27 | 27 | 28 | 29 | 29
6 | (Italy) Mauro Nespoli | 6 | 29 | 27 | 28 | 29 | 26

=== Section 7 ===
1/48 finals
7 | (Sweden) Jonas Andersson
Bye
39 | (France) Thomas Chirault | 7 | 29 | 27 | 24 | 27 | 27
74 | (Serbia) Mihajlo Stefanović | 4 | 27 | 27 | 28 | 28 | 26
87 | (Serbia) Jovica Velimirović | 5 | 29 | 28 | 27 | 27 | 27
26 | (Germany) Moritz Wieser | 6 | 29 | 29 | 25 | 26 | 28
23 | (Turkey) Samet Ak | 7 | 26 | 27 | 28 | 29 | 26
90 | (Slovakia) Ondrej Franců | 2 | 26 | 28 | 27 | 24 | 24
71 | (Hungary) Mátyás Balogh | 6 | 25 | 26 | 27 | 28 | 25
42 | (France) Pierre Plihon | 5 | 26 | 25 | 28 | 27 | 25
55 | (Poland) Miłosz Chojecki | 6 | 26 | 28 | 26 | 27 | 27
58 | (Croatia) Leo Sulik | 5 | 26 | 30 | 27 | 25 | 25
Bye
10 | (Spain) Pablo Acha

1/24 finals
7 | (Sweden) Jonas Andersson
Bye
39 | (France) Thomas Chirault | 0 | 24 | 25 | 23
26 | (Germany) Moritz Wieser | 6 | 26 | 26 | 27
23 | (Turkey) Samet Ak | 6 | 27 | 28 | 27
71 | (Hungary) Mátyás Balogh | 0 | 26 | 26 | 25
55 | (Poland) Miłosz Chojecki | 1 | 27 | 24 | 24 | 26 | 27
10 | (Spain) Pablo Acha | 7 | 27 | 28 | 29 | 24

1/16 finals
7 | (Sweden) Jonas Andersson | 4 | 30 | 25 | 28 | 27 | 26
26 | (Germany) Moritz Wieser | 6 | 28 | 26 | 27 | 29 | 28
23 | (Turkey) Samet Ak | 2 | 28 | 26 | 26 | 26
10 | (Spain) Pablo Acha | 6 | 29 | 28 | 26 | 26

1/8 finals
26 | (Germany) Moritz Wieser | 6 | 29 | 28 | 24 | 29 | 28
10 | (Spain) Pablo Acha | 5 | 29 | 26 | 26 | 28 | 30

=== Section 8 ===
1/48 finals
15 | (Italy) Federico Musolesi
Bye
63 | (Austria) Christian Zwetti | 6 | 26 | 24 | 27 | 28 | 27
50 | (Azerbaijan) Mahammadali Aliyev | 5 | 28 | 27 | 25 | 27 | 27
47 | (Netherlands) Steve Wijler | 4 | 27 | 29 | 28 | 24 | 22
66 | (Estonia) Märt Oona | 6 | 28 | 26 | 26 | 28 | 26
95 | (Estonia) Karl Kivilo | 0 | 22 | 26 | 22
18 | (Italy) Alessandro Paoli | 6 | 28 | 28 | 29
31 | (Switzerland) Thomas Rufer | 4 | 28 | 24 | 27 | 28 | 26
82 | (Finland) Verne Vuorinen | 6 | 27 | 27 | 29 | 28 | 26
79 | (Faroe Islands) Hans Petur Højgaard | 2 | 24 | 28 | 21 | 23
34 | (Poland) Kacper Sierakowski | 6 | 30 | 26 | 28 | 30
Bye
2 | (Spain) Miguel Alvariño

1/24 finals
15 | (Italy) Federico Musolesi | 6 | 28 | 27 | 25 | 27 | 30
63 | (Austria) Christian Zwetti | 5 | 26 | 29 | 28 | 27 | 27
66 | (Estonia) Märt Oona | 3 | 26 | 28 | 25 | 22 | 26
18 | (Italy) Alessandro Paoli | 7 | 26 | 27 | 29 | 27 | 29
82 | (Finland) Verne Vuorinen | 0 | 26 | 24 | 27
34 | (Poland) Kacper Sierakowski | 6 | 30 | 26 | 29
Bye
2 | (Spain) Miguel Alvariño

1/16 finals
15 | (Italy) Federico Musolesi | 7 | 29 | 29 | 29 | 26 | 28
18 | (Italy) Alessandro Paoli | 3 | 29 | 25 | 27 | 28 | 26
34 | (Poland) Kacper Sierakowski | 1 | 28 | 27 | 25 | 26
2 | (Spain) Miguel Alvariño | 7 | 28 | 28 | 30 | 28

1/8 finals
15 | (Italy) Federico Musolesi | 5 | 28 | 28 | 28 | 28 | 26
2 | (Spain) Miguel Alvariño | 6 | 27 | 28 | 28 | 28 | 29
