= 2022 European Archery Championships – Men's team recurve =

Archery competition

Men's Team Recurve at the 2022 European Archery Championships
- Location: Munich, Germany
- Dates: 6–12 June
- Competitors: 84 from 28 nations
- Teams: 28

Medalists
gold medal	Federico Musolesi; Mauro Nespoli; Alessandro Paoli	Italy
silver medal	Pablo Acha; Miguel Alvariño; Daniel Castro	Spain
bronze medal	Kéziah Chabin; Florian Faber; Thomas Rufer	Switzerland

2022 European Archery Championships
Men	Recurve	Compound
Women	Recurve	Compound
Team	Men's recurve	Men's compound
Team	Women's recurve	Women's compound
Mixed team	Recurve	Compound

The men's team recurve competition at the 2022 European Archery Championships took place from 6 to 12 June in Munich, Germany.

== Qualification round ==
Results after 216 arrows.

Rank	Nation	Name	Score	10+X	X
1	Spain	Pablo Acha; Miguel Alvariño; Daniel Castro	2030	108	36
2	Germany	Florian Unruh; Jonatta Vetter; Moritz Wieser	2022	98	32
3	Italy	Federico Musolesi; Mauro Nespoli; Alessandro Paoli	2003	91	30
4	Switzerland	Kéziah Chabin; Florian Faber; Thomas Rufer	1978	84	30
5	Turkey	Samet Ak; Efe Gürkan Maraş; Mete Gazoz	1978	81	23
6	Ukraine	Oleksii Hunbin; Ivan Kozhokar; Artem Ovchynnikov	1976	80	31
7	Netherlands	Gijs Broeksma; Rick van der Ven; Steve Wijler	1972	75	29
8	Slovenia	Den Habjan Malavašič; Sergej Podkrajšek; Žiga Ravnikar	1971	84	29
9	France	Thomas Chirault; Pierre Plihon; Jean-Charles Valladont	1962	74	24
10	Great Britain	Tom Hall; Patrick Huston; Alex Wise	1960	80	20
11	Croatia	Lovro Černi; Alen Remar; Leo Sulik	1935	72	22
12	Czech Republic	Michal Hlahůlek; Adam Li; Jaromír Termer	1928	61	26
13	Israel	Niv Frenkel; Eyal Roziner; Itay Shanny	1927	58	17
14	Belgium	Ben Adriaensen; Theo Carbonetti; Jarno De Smedt	1926	69	22
15	Poland	Miłosz Chojecki; Kacper Sierakowski; Marek Szafran	1924	65	22
16	Austria	Andreas Gstöttner; Julian Schweighofer; Christian Zwetti	1917	54	8
17	Finland	Antti Tekoniemi; Antti Vikström; Verne Vuorinen	1911	61	21
18	Denmark	Eli Bæk; Ludvig Njor Henriksen; Oliver Staudt	1910	59	21
19	Portugal	Nuno Carneiro; Luís Gonçalves; Tiago Matos	1905	69	25
20	Slovakia	Juraj Duchoň; Miroslav Duchoň; Ondrej Franců	1873	60	20
21	Georgia	Aleksandre Machavariani; Lasha Pkhakadze; Mirian Tsulukidze	1855	47	10
22	Moldova	Oleg Lacutco; Dan Olaru; Sergiu Sorici	1854	48	12
23	Latvia	Dāvis Blāze; Jānis Bružis; Gļebs Kononovs	1844	50	18
24	Bulgaria	Ivan Banchev; Todor Pendov; Blagoy Todorov	1841	51	19
25	Kosovo	Hazir Asllani; Edi Dvorani; Valmir Gllareva	1831	47	10
26	Lithuania	Dovydas Bagdanavičius; Ramūnas Kašėta; Modestas Šliauteris	1815	42	11
27	Serbia	Mihajlo Stefanović; Jovica Velimirović; Marko Vulić	1788	31	12
28	Iceland	Dagur Örn Fannarsson; Haraldur Gústafsson; Oliver Ormar Ingvarson	1114	16	5

== Final round ==
Semifinals
1	Spain	5	57	53	59	57
4	Switzerland	3	54	56	55	57
3	Italy	5	55	56	57	55
10	Great Britain	3	57	55	56	55

Finals
1	Spain	1	49	52	58
3	Italy	5	56	55	58
Third place
4	Switzerland	5	56	52	56	57
10	Great Britain	3	56	55	53	55

== Elimination round ==
=== Section 1 ===
1/12 finals
1	Spain
Bye
17	Finland	1	51	51	51
16	Austria	5	51	51	54
9	France	6	54	51	51
24	Bulgaria	0	53	47	49
Bye
8	Slovenia
5	Turkey
Bye
21	Georgia	5	41	51	50	54	25+
12	Czech Republic	4	53	45	53	52	25
13	Israel	4	57	51	49	54	24
20	Slovakia	5	51	51	53	54	25
Bye
4	Switzerland

1/8 finals
1	Spain	6	57	58	56	50
16	Austria	2	49	56	57	45
9	France	6	55	53	55	56
8	Slovenia	2	54	52	56	51
5	Turkey	5	49	53	55
21	Georgia	1	49	47	53
20	Slovakia	2	54	52	48	54
4	Switzerland	6	50	55	57	56

Quarterfinals
1	Spain	6	57	57	54	56
9	France	2	54	52	56	51
5	Turkey	0	54	53	50
4	Switzerland	6	58	56	53

Semifinals
1	Spain	5	57	53	59	57
4	Switzerland	3	54	56	55	57

=== Section 2 ===
1/12 finals
3	Italy
Bye
19	Portugal	6	55	50	51	53
14	Belgium	2	51	51	50	52
11	Croatia	5	45	52	54	54
22	Moldova	3	50	45	51	54
Bye
6	Ukraine
7	Netherlands
Bye
23	Latvia	2	57	47	48	51
10	Great Britain	6	55	52	55	56
15	Poland	4	58	45	51	53	23
18	Denmark	5	55	53	52	52	28
Bye
2	Germany

1/8 finals
3	Italy	6	56	53	56	53
19	Portugal	2	53	55	53	50
11	Croatia	0'	48	52	56
6	Ukraine	6	56	55	57
7	Netherlands	1	55	55	57
10	Great Britain	5	56	57	57
18	Denmark	3	51	57	50	51
2	Germany	5	55	49	55	51

Quarterfinals
3	Italy	5	54	58	56	57	27
6	Ukraine	4	53	53	57	59	26
10	Great Britain	5	56	53	57	53
2	Germany	4	54	57	54	55

Semifinals
3	Italy	5	55	56	57	55
10	Great Britain	3	57	55	56	55
