= 2022 European Archery Championships – Men's individual compound =

Archery competition

Men's Individual Compound at the 2022 European Archery Championships
- Location: Munich, Germany
- Dates: 6–11 June
- Competitors: 77 from 31 nations

Medalists
gold medal	Mike Schloesser	Netherlands
silver medal	Yakup Yıldız	Turkey
bronze medal	Robin Jäätma	Estonia

2022 European Archery Championships
Men	Recurve	Compound
Women	Recurve	Compound
Team	Men's recurve	Men's compound
Team	Women's recurve	Women's compound
Mixed team	Recurve	Compound

The men's individual compound competition at the 2022 European Archery Championships took place from 6 to 11 June in Munich, Germany.

== Qualification round ==
Results after 72 arrows.

Rank	Name	Nation	Score	10+X	X
1	Mike Schloesser	Netherlands	712	64	38
2	Nico Wiener	Austria	710	62	39
3	Emircan Haney	Turkey	709	61	28
4	Robin Jäätma	Estonia	708	61	35
5	Jean Philippe Boulch	France	707	60	31
6	Stephan Hansen	Denmark	707	59	28
7	Quinten Van Looy	Belgium	707	59	23
8	Mathias Fullerton	Denmark	706	59	25
9	Sebastian Hamdorf	Germany	706	58	19
10	Yakup Yıldız	Turkey	705	57	30
11	Jozef Bošanský	Slovakia	705	57	30
12	Martin Damsbo	Denmark	705	57	26
13	Domagoj Buden	Croatia	704	56	28
14	Stefan Heincz	Austria	703	55	26
15	Henning Luepkemann	Germany	702	56	26
16	Elia Fregnan	Italy	702	55	21
17	Marco Bruno	Italy	702	54	25
18	Anders Faugstad	Norway	701	54	27
19	Tim Jevsnik	Slovakia	701	54	23
20	Batuhan Akçaoğlu	Turkey	701	53	28
21	Viktor Orosz	Hungary	701	53	22
22	Roman Haefelfinger	Switzerland	700	56	21
23	Shamai Yamrom	Israel	700	53	28
24	Andrien Gontier	France	700	52	22
25	Adam Ravenscroft	Great Britain	699	53	21
26	Quentin Baraer	France	699	52	24
27	James Mason	Great Britain	699	51	26
28	Kevin Arias	Spain	699	51	19
29	Cláudio Alves	Portugal	699	51	12
30	Stavros Koumertas	Greece	698	53	22
31	Joakim Limas	Sweden	698	52	22
32	Aljaz Matija Brenk	Slovenia	698	50	22
33	Matti Tella	Finland	697	50	23
34	Kristjan Ilves	Estonia	696	50	17
35	Ognjen Nedeljkovıc	Serbia	696	49	23
36	Mads Haugseth	Norway	696	49	17
37	Lukasz Przybylski	Poland	695	47	20
38	Gilles Seywert	Luxembourg	694	48	24
39	Dimitrios - Konstantinos Drakiotis	Greece	694	47	20
40	Stuart Taylor	Great Britain	694	46	20
41	Michael Matzner	Austria	693	48	21
42	Simon Sedivy	Slovakia	693	46	19
43	Leoan Hollas	Germany	693	45	17
44	Jacob Benschjöld	Sweden	692	47	19
45	Manuel António Carvalho	Portugal	692	47	14
46	Nuno Simões	Portugal	692	46	19
47	Stas Modic	Slovenia	691	46	19
48	Valerio Della Stau	Italy	690	43	21
49	Evert Ressar	Estonia	689	47	22
50	Stefan Hansson	Sweden	689	44	22
51	Przemyslaw Konecki	Poland	689	42	15
52	Pavel Zaoral	Czech Republic	688	44	32
53	Joannes Poulsen	Faroe Islands	687	44	20
54	Athanasios Kostopoulos	Greece	686	44	19
55	Antti Peltoniemi	Finland	685	44	11
56	Krzysztof Gorczyca	Poland	685	41	12
57	Sil Pater	Netherlands	684	42	13
58	Victor Canalejas Tejero	Switzerland	684	41	18
59	Ben Moes	Luxembourg	684	40	11
60	Vili Toivanen	Finland	683	39	18
61	Stef Willems	Netherlands	682	40	16
62	Arnaud Hocevar	Luxembourg	682	40	16
63	Serhiy Atamanenko	Ukraine	682	39	13
64	Filip Reitmeier	Czech Republic	682	37	12
65	Martin Vanek	Czech Republic	680	35	11
66	Samuel Zeman	Slovakia	678	35	15
67	Vladas Sigauskas	Lithuania	677	42	15
68	Milos Stojadinovic	Serbia	675	33	15
69	Trym Isnes	Norway	674	34	8
70	Alfred Birgisson	Iceland	659	29	9
71	Edgars Silovs	Latvia	656	24	7
72	Remigijus Bileisis	Lithuania	655	27	9
73	Yehonatan Melamed	Israel	651	27	13
74	Rolandas Baranauskas	Lithuania	649	22	7
75	Albert Olafsson	Iceland	642	20	7
76	Dagur Orn Fannarsson	Iceland	638	19	7
77	Zhomart Bektursun	Faroe Islands	634	23	5

== Final round ==
Semifinals
1	(Netherlands) Mike Schloesser	149
4	(Estonia) Robin Jäätma	146
11	(Slovakia) Jozef Bosansky	145^{10}
10	(Turkey) Yakup Yıldız	145^{10+}

Finals
1	(Netherlands) Mike Schloesser	148
10	(Turkey) Yakup Yıldız	146
Third place
4	(Estonia) Robin Jäätma	148^{10}
11	(Slovakia) Jozef Bosansky	148^{9}

== Elimination round ==
=== Section 1 ===
1/48 finals
1	(Netherlands) Mike Schloesser
Bye
33	(Finland) Matti Tella
Bye
Bye
32	(Slovenia) Aljaz Matija Brenk
17	(Italy) Marco Bruno
Bye
65	(Czech Republic) Martin Vanek	140
48	(Italy) Valerio Della Stua	144
49	(Estonia) Evert Ressar	142
64	(Czech Republic) Filip Reitmeier	137
Bye
16	(Italy) Elia Fregnan
9	(Germany) Sebastian Hamdorf
Bye
57	(Netherlands) Sil Pater	143
56	(Poland) Krzysztof Gorczyca	136
41	(Austria) Michael Matzner	139
72	(Lithuania) Remigijus Bileisis	136
Bye
24	(France) Adrien Gontier
25	(United Kingdom) Adam Ravenscroft
Bye
73	(Israel) Yehonatan Melamed	133
40	(United Kingdom) Stuart Taylor	140
Bye
8	(Denmark) Mathias Fullerton

1/24 finals
1	(Netherlands) Mike Schloesser
Bye
33	(Finland) Matti Tella	141
32	(Slovenia) Aljaz Matija Brenk	143
17	(Italy) Marco Bruno	146
48	(Italy) Valerio Della Stua	147
49	(Estonia) Ressar Evert	144
16	(Italy) Sebastian Hamdorf	141
9	(Germany) Sebastian Hamdorf	141
56	(Netherlands) Sil Pater	141^{X+}
41	(Austria) Michael Matzner	142
24	(France) Adrien Gontier	146
25	(United Kingdom) Adam Ravenscroft	143
40	(United Kingdom) Stuart Taylor	145
Bye
8	(Denmark) Mathias Fullerton

1/16 finals
1	(Netherlands) Mike Schloesser	143
32	(Slovenia) Aljaz Matija Brenk
48	(Italy) Valerio Della Stua	140
49	(Estonia) Ressar Evert	137
56	(Netherlands) Sil Pater	142
24	(France) Adrien Gontier	144
40	(United Kingdom) Stuart Taylor	143
8	(Denmark) Mathias Fullerton	142

1/8 finals
1	(Netherlands) Mike Schloesser	148
48	(Italy) Valerio Della Stua	140
24	(France) Adrien Gontier	146
40	(United Kingdom) Stuart Taylor	142

Quarterfinals
1	(Netherlands) Mike Schloesser	148
24	(France) Adrien Gontier	145

=== Section 2 ===
1/48 finals
5	(France) Jean Philippe Boulch
Bye
37	(Poland) Łukasz Przybylski	146
76	(Iceland) Dagur Orn Fannarsson	129
Bye
28	(Spain) Kevin Arias
21	(Hungary) Viktor Orosz
Bye
69	(Norway) Trym Isnes	140
44	(Sweden) Jacob Benschjöld	146
53	(Faroe Islands) Joannes Poulsen	142
60	(Finland) Vili Toivanen	147
Bye
12	(Denmark) Martin Damsbo
13	(Croatia) Domagoj Buden
Bye
61	(Netherlands) Stef Willems	144
52	(Czech Republic) Pavel Zaoral	141
45	(Portugal) Manuel António Carvalho	144
68	(Serbia) Milos Stojadinovic	145
Bye
20	(Turkey) Batuhan Akçaoğlu
29	(Portugal) Cláudio Alves
Bye
77	(Faroe Islands) Samuel Trygvason Petersen	139
36	(Norway) Mads Haugseth	144
Bye
4	(Estonia) Robin Jäätma

1/24 finals
5	(France) Jean Philippe Boulch
Bye
37	(Poland) Łukasz Przybylski	144
28	(Spain) Kevin Arias	145
21	(Hungary) Viktor Orosz	141
44	(Sweden) Jacob Benschjöld	142
60	(Finland) Vili Toivanen	144
12	(Denmark) Martin Damsbo	147
13	(Croatia) Domagoj Buden	147
61	(Netherlands) Stef Willems	135
68	(Serbia) Milos Stojadinovic	142
20	(Turkey) Batuhan Akçaoğlu	149
29	(Portugal) Cláudio Alves	141
36	(Denmark) Mads Haugseth	144
Bye
4	(Estonia) Robin Jäätma

1/16 finals
5	(France) Jean Philippe Boulch	144
28	(Spain) Kevin Arias	144
44	(Sweden) Jacob Benschjöld	143
12	(Denmark) Martin Damsbo	143
13	(Croatia) Domagoj Buden	146
20	(Turkey) Batuhan Akçaoğlu	145
36	(Norway) Mads Haugseth	143
4	(Estonia) Robin Jäätma	150

1/8 finals
28	(Spain) Kevin Arias	145
12	(Denmark) Martin Damsbo	145
13	(Croatia) Domagoj Buden	144
4	(Estonia) Robin Jäätma	146

Quarterfinals
28	(Spain) Kevin Arias	145
4	(Estonia) Robin Jäätma	148

=== Section 3 ===
1/48 finals
3	(Turkey) Emircan Haney
Bye
35	(Serbia) Ognjen Nedeljkovic
Bye
Bye
30	(Greece) Stavros Koumertas
19	(Slovenia) Tim Jevsnik
Bye
67	(Lithuania) Vladas Sigauskas	139
46	(Portugal) Nuno Simões	131
51	(Poland) Przemyslaw Konecki	145
62	(Luxembourg) Arnaud Hocevar	144
Bye
14	(Austria) Stefan Heincz
11	(Slovakia) Jozef Bosansky
Bye
59	(Luxembourg) Ben Moes	143
54	(Greece) Athanasios Kostopoulos	144
43	(Germany) Leon Hollas	145
70	(Iceland) Alfred Birgisson	144
Bye
22	(Switzerland) Roman Haefelfinger
27	(United Kingdom) James Mason
Bye
75	(Iceland) Albert Olafsson	136
38	(Luxembourg) Gilles Seywert	143
Bye
6	(Denmark) Stephan Hansen

1/24 finals
3	(Turkey) Emircan Haney
Bye
35	(Serbia) Ognjen Nedeljkovic	146
30	(Greece) Koumertas Stavros	144
19	(Slovenia) Tim Jevsnik	145
46	(Lithuania) Vladas Sigauskas	137
51	(Poland) Konecki Przemyslaw	143
14	(Austria) Stefan Heincz	141
11	(Slovakia) Jozef Bosansky	149
59	(Greece) Athanasios Kostopoulos	142
43	(Germany) Leon Hollas	149
22	(Switzerland) Roman Haefelfinger	143
27	(United Kingdom) James Mason	143
38	(Luxembourg) Gilles Seywert	144
Bye
6	(Denmark) Stephan Hansen

1/16 finals
3	(Turkey) Emircan Haney	147
35	(Serbia) Ognjen Nedeljkovic	145
19	(Slovenia) Tim Jevsnik	145
51	(Poland) Konecki Przemyslaw	143
11	(Slovakia) Jozef Bosansky	148
43	(Germany) Leon Hollas	146
38	(Luxembourg) Gilles Seywert	145
6	(Denmark) Stephan Hansen	146

1/8 finals
3	(Turkey) Emircan Haney	145
19	(Slovenia) Tim Jevsnik	144
11	(Slovakia) Jozef Bosansky	144
6	(Denmark) Stephan Hansen	144

Quarterfinals
3	(Turkey) Emircan Haney	145
11	(Slovakia) Jozef Bosansky	148

=== Section 4 ===
1/48 finals
7	(Belgium) Quinten van Looy
Bye
39	(Greece) Dimitrios - Konstantinos Drakiotis	146
74	(Lithuania) Rolandas Baranauskas	134
Bye
26	(France) Quentin Baraer
23	(Israel) Shamai Yamrom
Bye
71	(Puerto Rico) Edgars Silovs	140
42	(Slovakia) Simon Sedivy	147
55	(Finland) Antti Peltoniemi	139
58	(Switzerland) Tejero Victor Canalejas	141
Bye
10	(Turkey) Yakup Yıldız
15	(Germany) Henning Luepkemann
Bye
63	(Ukraine) Serhiy Atamanenko	142
50	(Sweden) Stefan Hansson	145
47	(Slovenia) Stas Modic	147
66	(Slovakia) Samuel Zeman	128
Bye
18	(Norway) Anders Faugstad
31	(Sweden) Joakim Limås
Bye
Bye
34	(Estonia) Kristjan Ilves
Bye
2	(Austria) Nico Wiener

1/24 finals
7	(Belgium) Quinten van Looy
Bye
39	(Greece) Dimitrios - Konstantinos Drakiotis	144
26	(France) Quentin Baraer	146
23	(Israel) Shamai Yamrom	148
42	(Slovenia) Simon Sedivy	145
58	(Switzerland) Tejero Victor Canalejas	145
10	(Turkey) Yakup Yıldız	148
15	(Germany) Henning Luepkemann	146
50	(Sweden) Stefan Hansson	145
47	(Slovenia) Stas Modic	147
18	(Norway) Anders Faugstad	145
31	(Sweden) Joakim Limås	136
34	(Estonia) Kristjan Ilves	145
Bye
2	(Austria) Nico Wiener

1/16 finals
7	(Belgium) Quinten van Looy	144
26	(France) Quentin Baraer	146
23	(Israel) Shamai Yamrom	141
10	(Turkey) Yakup Yıldız	145
15	(Germany) Henning Luepkemann	145
47	(Slovenia) Stas Modic	143
34	(Estonia) Kristjan Ilves	143
2	(Austria) Nico Wiener	145

1/8 finals
26	(France) Quentin Baraer	145
10	(Turkey) Yakup Yıldız	148
15	(Germany) Henning Luepkemann	147
2	(Austria) Nico Wiener	146

Quarterfinals
10	(Turkey) Yakup Yıldız	148
15	(Germany) Henning Luepkemann	144
