= 2022 European Archery Championships – Mixed team compound =

Archery competition

Mixed Team Compound at the 2022 European Archery Championships
- Location: Munich, Germany
- Dates: 7–11 June
- Competitors: 44 from 22 nations
- Teams: 22

Medalists
gold medal	Tanja Gellenthien; Stephan Hansen	Denmark
silver medal	Lisell Jäätma; Robin Jäätma	Estonia
bronze medal	Yeşim Bostan; Emircan Haney	Turkey

2022 European Archery Championships
Men	Recurve	Compound
Women	Recurve	Compound
Team	Men's recurve	Men's compound
Team	Women's recurve	Women's compound
Mixed team	Recurve	Compound

The mixed team compound competition at the 2022 European Archery Championships took place from 7 to 11 June in Munich, Germany.

== Qualification round ==
Results after 144 arrows.

Rank	Nation	Name	Score	10+X	X
1	Denmark	Tanja Gellenthien; Stephan Hansen	1416	120	52
2	Turkey	Yeşim Bostan; Emircan Haney	1409	116	48
3	Netherlands	Sanne de Laat; Mike Schloesser	1408	114	55
4	Great Britain	Ella Gibson; Adam Ravenscroft	1408	114	52
5	Belgium	Sarah Prieels; Quinten Van Looy	1405	111	41
6	Estonia	Lisell Jäätma; Robin Jäätma	1404	111	52
7	France	Sophie Dodemont; Jean-Philippe Boulch	1402	108	51
8	Croatia	Amanda Mlinarić; Domagoj Buden	1398	108	47
9	Italy	Elisa Roner; Elia Fragnan	1396	101	38
10	Germany	Julia Böhnke; Sebastian Hamdorf	1390	100	36
11	Finland	Satu Nisula; Matti Tella	1389	96	38
12	Luxembourg	Mariya Shokolna; Gilles Seywert	1387	95	50
13	Austria	Ingrid Ronacher; Nico Wiener	1380	92	53
14	Poland	Małgorzata Kapusta; Łukasz Przybylski	1378	86	29
15	Spain	Andrea Muñoz; Kevin Arias	1372	86	29
16	Czech Republic	Martina Zikmundová; Pavel Zaoral	1368	79	35
17	Portugal	Maria João Ribeiro; Cláudio Alves	1364	79	22
18	Ukraine	Kseniia Shkliar; Serhiy Atamanenko	1361	76	22
19	Switzerland	Myriam Hasler; Roman Häfelfinger	1356	84	32
20	Iceland	Anna Maria Alfreðsdóttir; Alfreð Birgisson	1339	65	20
21	Slovakia	Petra Kočutová; Jozef Bošanský	1314	78	39
22	Latvia	Jūlija Oleksejenko; Edgars Silovs	1264	37	10

== Elimination round ==
1/12 finals
17	Portugal	152
16	Czech Republic	156
21	Slovakia	153
12	Luxembourg	154
13	Austria	155
20	Iceland	149
19	Switzerland	149
14	Poland	151
11	Finland	155
22	Latvia	153
15	Spain	153^{18+}
18	Ukraine	153^{20+}

1/8 finals
1	Denmark	157
16	Czech Republic	152
9	Italy	158
8	Croatia	152
5	Belgium	155
12	Luxembourg	154
13	Austria	154
4	Great Britain	156
3	Netherlands	158
14	Poland	151
11	Finland	153
6	Estonia	157
7	France	153
10	Germany	150
18	Ukraine	151
2	Turkey	157

Quarterfinals
1	Denmark	155
9	Italy	154
5	Belgium	159
4	Great Britain	158
3	Netherlands	157
6	Estonia	158
7	France	154
2	Turkey	158

Semifinals
1	Denmark	156
5	Belgium	153
6	Estonia	154^{19+}
2	Turkey	154^{19}

Final
1	Denmark	156
6	Estonia	153
Third place
5	Belgium	155
2	Turkey	156
