= Yakup Yıldız =

Turkish compound archer

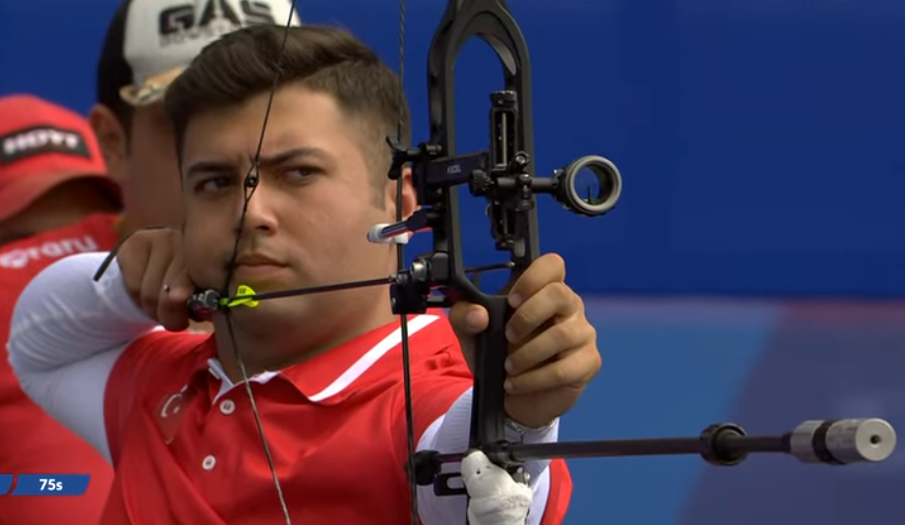
- At the 2025 Summer World University Games

Personal information
- Nationality: Turkish
- Born: 4 October 2002 (age 23) Istanbul, Turkey
- Home town: Ankara, Turkey
- Education: Lokman Hekim University

Sport
- Country: Turkey
- Sport: Archery
- Event: compound
- Team: Ankara Atlantis
Medal record
Men's Archery
Representing Turkey
European Championships
Gold medal – first place	2021 Antalya	Individual
Gold medal – first place	2021 Antalya	Team
Gold medal – first place	2022 Munich	Team
Silver medal – second place	2022 Munich	Individual
European Indoor Championships
Gold medal – first place	2019 Samsun	Junior team
Silver medal – second place	2019 Samsun	Junior Individual
Bronze medal – third place	2022 Laško	U-21 Team
World Cup
Gold medal – first place	2021 Lausanne	Team
Silver medal – second place	2022 Paris	Team
Bronze medal – third place	2023 Shanghai	Team
FISU World University Games
Gold medal – first place	2025 Essen	Team

Yakup Yıldız (born 4 October 2002) is a Turkish male compound archer and part of the national team.

== Sport career ==
Yıldız won the gold medal together with his teammates in the second leg of the 2021 Archery World Cup in Lausanne, Switzerland. He took two gold medals, in the individual and the team event, at the 2021 European Archery Championships held in Antalya, Turkey.

In 2022, Yakup Yıldız won the bronze medal in the men's U-21 team compound event at the Laško, Slovenia event in the 2022 European Indoor Archery Championships. He won the gold medal in the men's team compound event at the European Archery Championships held in Munich, Germany. He also won the silver medal in the men's individual compound event.

In 2025, Yıldız, together with Yunus Emre Arslan and Batuhan Akçaoğlu, won the gold medal in the compound men's team event at the Archery at the 2025 Summer World University Games in Essen, Germany.
