= Lisell Jäätma =

Estonian archer (born 1999)

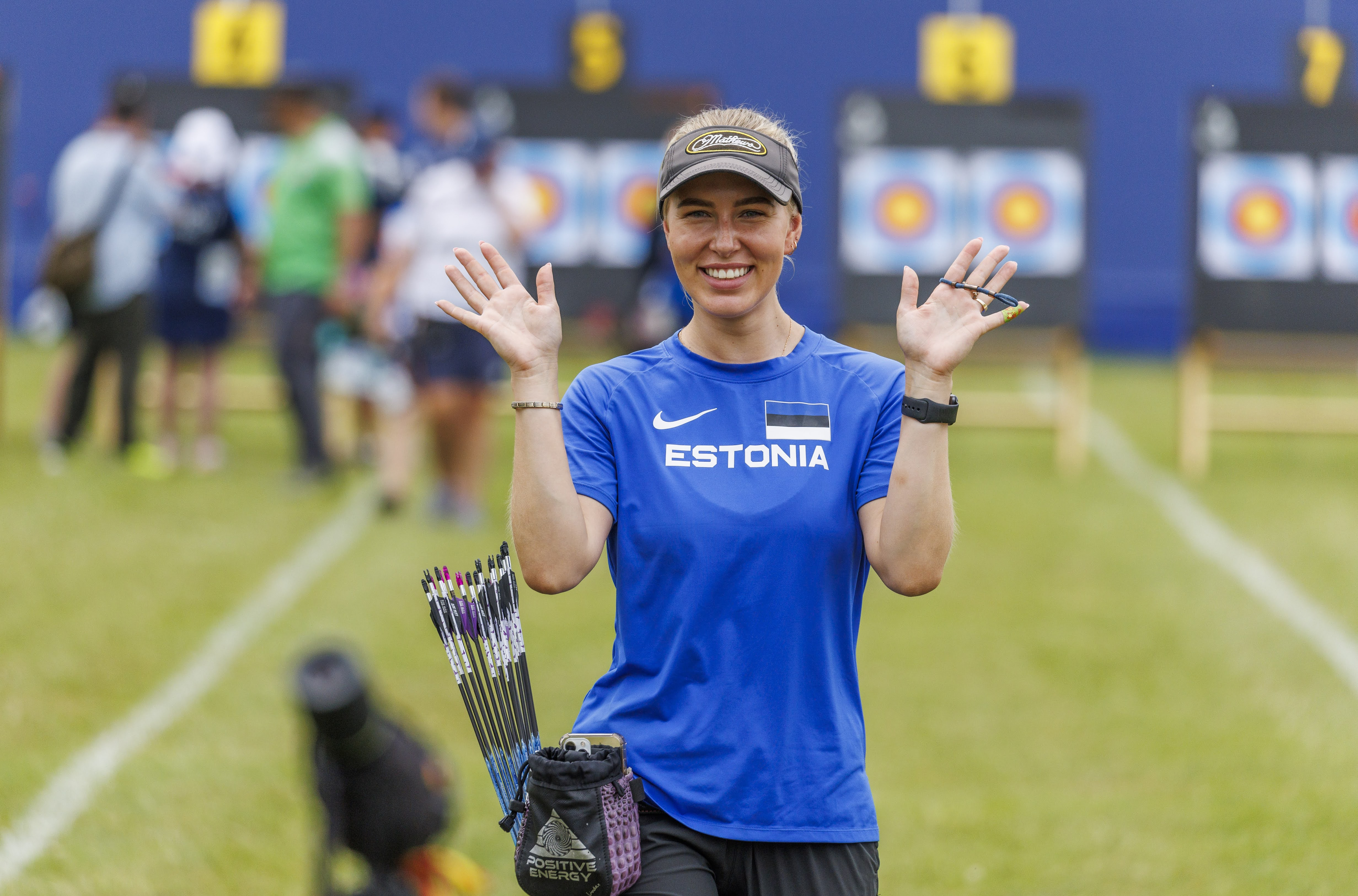
- Lisell Jäätma (2023)

Personal information
- Citizenship: Estonian
- Born: 19 July 1999 (age 27)

Sport
- Country: Estonia
- Sport: Archery
- Event: Compound
Medal record
Women's compound archery
Representing Estonia
World Games
Silver medal – second place	2025 Chengdu	Individual
European Games
Gold medal – first place	2023 Kraków-Małopolska	Mixed team
European Championships
Silver medal – second place	2021 Antalya	Mixed team
Silver medal – second place	2022 Munich	Mixed team
Bronze medal – third place	2024 Essen	Team
Bronze medal – third place	2026 Antalya	Team
European Indoor Championships
Silver medal – second place	2022 Laško	Team
World Cup
Gold medal – first place	2026 Shanghai	Individual
Silver medal – second place	2022 Gwangju	Team
Silver medal – second place	2022 Gwangju	Mixed team
Silver medal – second place	2024 Shanghai	Mixed team
Silver medal – second place	2026 Puebla	Individual
Bronze medal – third place	2022 Antalya	Individual
Bronze medal – third place	2022 Antalya	Team
Bronze medal – third place	2023 Medellín	Mixed team
Bronze medal – third place	2026 Shanghai	Mixed team
Summer Universiade
Gold medal – first place	2019 Naples	Mixed team

Lisell Jäätma (born 19 July 1999) is an Estonian archer competing in compound events. She won the silver medal in the women's individual event at the 2025 World Games held in Chengdu, China. Jäätma and Robin Jäätma won the gold medal in the mixed team compound event at the 2023 European Games held in Poland.

== Early life ==
Lisell Jäätma was born in Paide. Her mother is archer and trainer Maarika Jäätma and her younger brother is archer Robin Jäätma.

== Career ==
Jäätma, Emily Hoim and Meeri-Marita Paas won the gold medal in the junior women's team compound event at the 2017 European Indoor Archery Championships held in Vittel, France. In 2019, Jäätma and her brother Robin Jäätma won the gold medal in the mixed team compound event at the Summer Universiade held in Naples, Italy. They won the silver medal in the mixed team compound event at the 2021 European Archery Championships held in Antalya, Turkey.

Jäätma won the gold medal in the women's compound event at the 2020 Sud de France Nimes Archery Tournament. She also won the gold medal in this event in 2021.

In 2022, Jäätma won the silver medal in the women's team compound event at the European Indoor Archery Championships held in Laško, Slovenia. She won the bronze medal in the women's compound event at the Antalya, Turkey event in the 2022 Archery World Cup. Jäätma and Robin Jäätma won the silver medal in the mixed team compound event at the 2022 European Archery Championships held in Munich, Germany.

Jäätma, Meeri-Marita Paas and Maris Tetsmann won the bronze medal in the women's team compound event at the 2024 European Archery Championships held in Essen, Germany.

In 2025, she won the silver medal in the women's individual compound event at the World Games held in Chengdu, China.
