= 2021 European Archery Championships =

2021 European Championship
- Location: Antalya, Turkey
- Dates: 31 May – 6 June

The 2021 European Archery Championships were held from 31 May to 6 June in Antalya, Turkey.

== Medal table ==
* Host nation (Turkey)

Rank	Nation	Gold	Silver	Bronze	Total
1	Russia	2	1	1	4
2	France	2	1	0	3
3	Turkey*	2	0	0	2
4	Denmark	1	1	1	3
4	Netherlands	1	1	1	3
6	Spain	1	1	0	2
7	Belgium	1	0	0	1
8	Germany	0	1	2	3
9	Belarus	0	1	0	1
9	Estonia	0	1	0	1
9	Great Britain	0	1	0	1
9	Ukraine	0	1	0	1
13	Poland	0	0	2	2
14	Greece	0	0	1	1
14	Italy	0	0	1	1
14	Slovakia	0	0	1	1
Totals (16 entries)		10	10	10	30

== Medal summary ==
=== Recurve ===
Event	Gold	Silver	Bronze
Men's individual	Pablo Acha; Spain	Galsan Bazarzhapov; Russia	Moritz Wieser; Germany
Women's individual	Lisa Barbelin; France	Karyna Dziominskaya; Belarus	Denisa Baránková; Slovakia
Men's team	Netherlands (NED); Steve Wijler; Sjef van den Berg; Rick van der Ven	Ukraine (UKR); Ivan Kozhokar; Oleksii Hunbin; Heorhiy Ivanytskyy	Russia (RUS); Aldar Tsybikzhapov; Galsan Bazarzhapov; Beligto Tsynguev
Women's team	Russia (RUS); Elena Osipova; Svetlana Gomboeva; Ksenia Perova	Germany (GER); Lisa Unruh; Michelle Kroppen; Charline Schwarz	Denmark (DEN); Maja Jager; Kirstine Andersen; Randi Degn
Mixed team	Russia (RUS); Elena Osipova; Aldar Tsybikzhapov	Spain (ESP); Elia Canales; Pablo Acha	Poland (POL); Magdalena Śmiałkowska; Kacper Sierakowski

=== Compound ===
Event	Gold	Silver	Bronze
Men's individual	Yakup Yıldız; Turkey	Mathias Fullerton; Denmark	Lukasz Przybylski; Poland
Women's individual	Tanja Gellenthien; Denmark	Ella Gibson; Great Britain	Sanne de Laat; Netherlands
Men's team	Turkey (TUR); Evren Çağıran; Furkan Oruç; Yakup Yıldız	France (FRA); Quentin Baraër; Nicolas Girard; Adrien Gontier	Greece (GRE); Dimitrios-Konstantinos Drakiotis; Stavros Koumertas; Andreas Zacharakis
Women's team	France (FRA); Lola Grandjean; Sophie Dodemont; Tiphaine Renaudin	Netherlands (NED); Sanne de Laat; Jody Vermeulen; Inge van der Ven	Italy (ITA); Sara Ret; Irene Franchini; Marcella Tonioli
Mixed team	Belgium (BEL); Sarah Prieels; Reginald Kools	Estonia (EST); Lisell Jäätma; Robin Jäätma	Germany (GER); Janine Meissner; Tim Krippendorf

== Participating nations ==
40 countries participated in this competition.

- Austria (9)
- Azerbaijan (5)
- Belarus (6)
- Belgium (6)
- Bulgaria (4)
- Croatia (6)
- Cyprus (4)
- Czech Republic (11)
- Denmark (11)
- Estonia (9)
- Finland (6)
- France (12)
- Germany (12)
- Great Britain (3)
- Greece (9)
- Hungary (2)
- Iceland (1)
- Ireland (3)
- Israel (6)
- Italy (12)
- Kosovo (2)
- Latvia (1)
- Lithuania (6)
- Luxembourg (5)
- Moldova (5)
- Montenegro (1)
- Netherlands (11)
- Norway (2)
- Poland (12)
- Portugal (10)
- Romania (6)
- Russia (12)
- Serbia (4)
- Slovakia (9)
- Slovenia (7)
- Spain (12)
- Sweden (7)
- Switzerland (10)
- Turkey (12)
- Ukraine (8)
