= 2022 European Archery Championships =

2022 European Championships
- Venue: Munich
- Location: Munich, Germany
- Dates: 6 to 12 June 2022
- Competitors: 296 from 40 nations

The 2022 European Archery Championships were held from 6 to 12 June in Munich, Germany.

2022 European Archery Championships
Men	Recurve	Compound
Women	Recurve	Compound
Team	Men's recurve	Men's compound
Team	Women's recurve	Women's compound
Mixed team	Recurve	Compound

Championships also served as qualification event for 2023 European Games.

== Medal table ==
* Host nation (Germany)

Rank	Nation	Gold	Silver	Bronze	Total
1	Turkey	2	2	4	8
2	Netherlands	2	1	0	3
3	Great Britain	2	0	0	2
4	Germany*	1	3	1	5
5	Italy	1	1	1	3
6	Spain	1	1	0	2
7	Denmark	1	0	0	1
8	Estonia	0	1	1	2
9	France	0	1	0	1
10	Austria	0	0	1	1
10	Slovenia	0	0	1	1
10	Switzerland	0	0	1	1
Totals (12 entries)		10	10	10	30

== Medal summary ==
=== Recurve ===
Event	Gold	Silver	Bronze
Men's individual	Miguel Alvariño; Spain	Florian Unruh; Germany	Mete Gazoz; Turkey
Women's individual	Gülnaz Büşranur Coşkun; Turkey	Michelle Kroppen; Germany	Katharina Bauer; Germany
Men's team	Italy; Federico Musolesi; Mauro Nespoli; Alessandro Paoli	Spain; Pablo Acha; Miguel Alvariño; Daniel Castro	Switzerland; Kéziah Chabin; Florian Faber; Thomas Rufer
Women's team	Germany; Michelle Kroppen; Katharina Bauer; Charline Schwarz	Turkey; Ezgi Başaran; Gülnaz Büşranur Coşkun; Yasemin Anagöz	Slovenia; Ana Umer; Urška Čavič; Nina Corel
Mixed team	Netherlands; Gabriela Schloesser; Rick van der Ven	Germany; Florian Unruh; Michelle Kroppen	Italy; Tatiana Andreoli; Mauro Nespoli

=== Compound ===
Event	Gold	Silver	Bronze
Men's individual	Mike Schloesser; Netherlands	Yakup Yıldız; Turkey	Robin Jäätma; Estonia
Women's individual	Isabelle Carpenter; Great Britain	Sophie Dodemont; France	Ayşe Bera Süzer; Turkey
Men's team	Turkey; Batuhan Akçaoğlu; Emircan Haney; Yakup Yıldız	Netherlands; Sil Pater; Mike Schloesser; Stef Willems	Austria; Stefan Heincz; Michael Matzner; Nico Wiener
Women's team	Great Britain; Isabelle Carpenter; Ella Gibson; Jessica Stretton	Italy; Sara Ret; Elisa Roner; Marcella Tonioli	Turkey; Yeşim Bostan; Ayşe Bera Süzer; Songül Lök
Mixed team	Denmark; Tanja Gellenthien; Stephan Hansen	Estonia; Lisell Jäätma; Robin Jäätma	Turkey; Yeşim Bostan; Emircan Haney

== Participating countries ==
A total of 296 competitors and 103 officials from the national teams of the following 40 countries were registered to compete at 2022 European Championships.

- Austria (8)
- Azerbaijan (4)
- Belgium (6)
- Bulgaria (4)
- Croatia (5)
- Cyprus (1)
- Czech Republic (10)
- Denmark (12)
- Estonia (11)
- Faroe Islands (3)
- Finland (10)
- France (12)
- Georgia (6)
- Germany (12)
- Great Britain (12)
- Greece (6)
- Hungary (2)
- Iceland (12)
- Ireland (4)
- Israel (5)
- Italy (12)
- Kosovo (3)
- Latvia (6)
- Lithuania (9)
- Luxembourg (6)
- Moldova (4)
- Netherlands (12)
- Norway (4)
- Poland (12)
- Portugal (9)
- Romania (2)
- San Marino (1)
- Serbia (6)
- Slovakia (10)
- Slovenia (9)
- Spain (8)
- Sweden (6)
- Switzerland (10)
- Turkey (12)
- Ukraine (10)
- Belarusian and Russian archers were not allowed to compete at the event after a ban as a result of the Russian invasion of Ukraine.
