= Gülnaz Büşranur Coşkun =

Turkish recurve archer (born 1999)

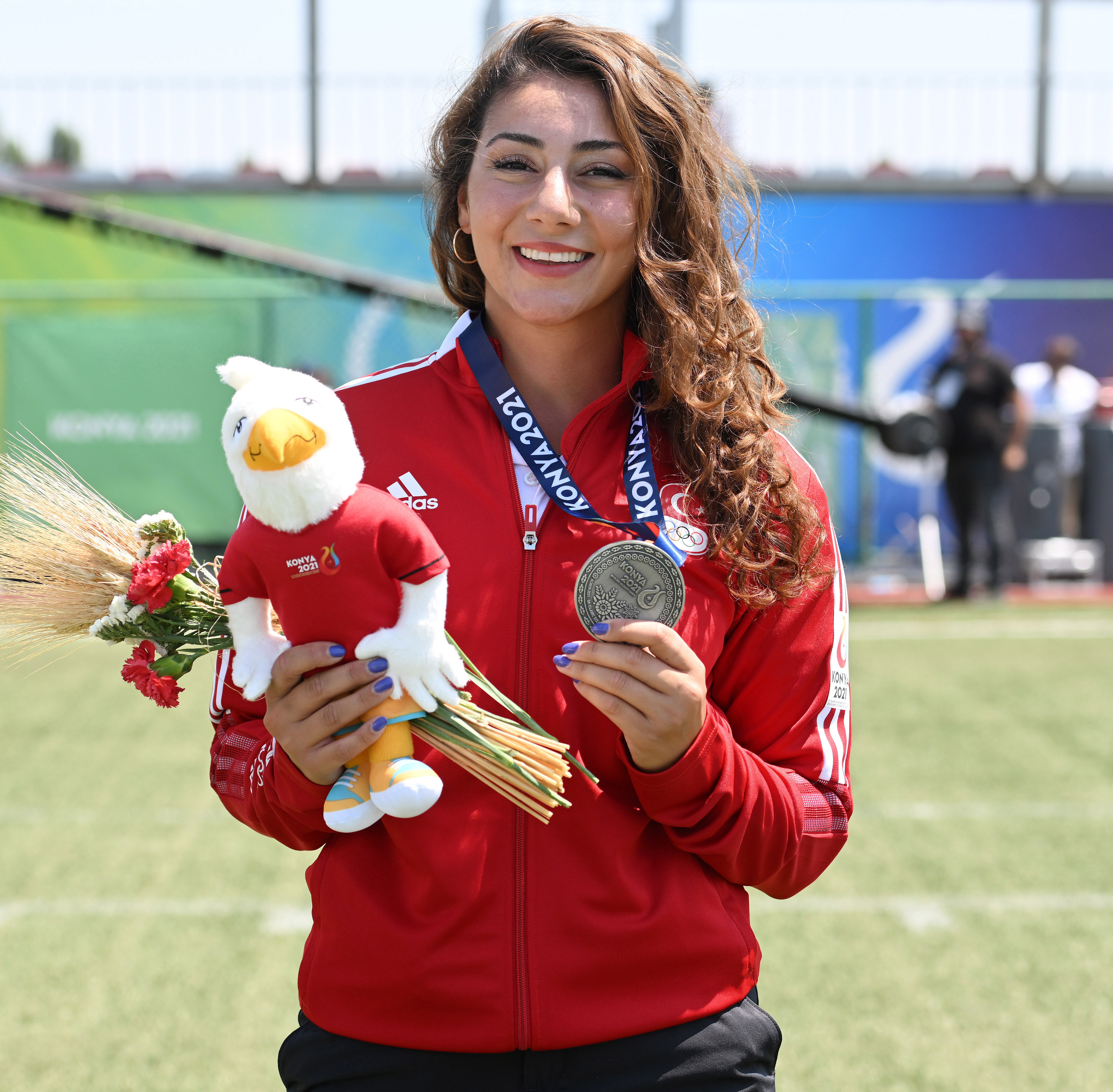

Personal information
- Nationality: Turkish
- Born: 25 August 1999 (age 26) Samsun, Turkey
- Home town: Ankara, Turkey

Sport
- Country: Turkey
- Sport: Archery
- Event: Archery Recurve
- Team: İstanbul Büyükşehir Belediyespor
- Coached by: Cevdet Dinçer
Medal record
Archery Recurve
Representing Turkey
European Championships
Gold medal – first place	2018 Legnica	Women Team
Gold medal – first place	2022 Munich	Women
Silver medal – second place	2022 Munich	Women team
Bronze medal – third place	2018 Legnica	Women
European Indoor Championships
Silver medal – second place	2022 Laško	Women Team
Islamic Solidarity Games
Gold medal – first place	2021 Konya	Team
Silver medal – second place	2021 Konya	Individual
Mediterranean Games
Gold medal – first place	2022 Oran	Team
Bronze medal – third place	2018 Tarragona	Women Team

Gülnaz Büşranur Coşkun (born 25 August 1999) is a Turkish recurve archer.

== Sport career ==
Gülnaz Büşranur Coşkun won the silver medal in the women's team recurve event at the 2022 European Indoor Archery Championships held in Laško, Slovenia.

She won the gold medal in the women's individual recurve event at the 2022 European Archery Championships held in Munich, Germany. She also won the silver medal in the women's team recurve event.
