= Pablo Acha =

Spanish recurve archer (born 1996)

Personal information
- Full name: Pablo Acha González
- Born: 4 August 1996 (age 30) Burgos, Spain

Sport
- Country: Spain
- Sport: Archery
- Event: Recurve
Medal record
Men's Archery
Representing Spain
European Championships
Gold medal – first place	2021 Antalya	Individual
Silver medal – second place	2021 Antalya	Mixed team
Silver medal – second place	2026 Antalya	Team
European Games
Silver medal – second place	2023 Kraków-Małopolska	Team
Bronze medal – third place	2019 Minsk	Individual
Bronze medal – third place	2023 Kraków-Małopolska	Individual
Mediterranean Games
Silver medal – second place	2022 Oran	Team
Bronze medal – third place	2018 Tarragona	Individual
Bronze medal – third place	2018 Tarragona	Team
World Cup
Gold medal – first place	2021 Guatemala City	Team
Silver medal – second place	2021 Lausanne	Team
Bronze medal – third place	2017 Antalya	Mixed team
- Updated on 9 June 2021

Pablo Acha González (born 4 August 1996) is a Spanish male recurve archer.

Acha won an individual gold medal and a mixed team silver medal at the 2021 European Championships. He has also medalled at the 2018 Mediterranean Games, the 2019 European Games and several Archery World Cups.

== Career ==
In 2017, Acha debuted on the senior international circuit. He won a surprise bronze medal in the mixed team event in the second leg of the 2017 Archery World Cup in Antalya, defeating the American team in the third-place match while partnering with Alicia Marín. He also competed in his first World Championships a few months later.

Acha won two bronze medals at the 2018 Mediterranean Games in Tarragona, one as an individual and one as a team. He followed this with another individual bronze at the 2019 European Games in Minsk, which secured Spain's qualification to the 2020 Summer Olympics. Due to the COVID-19 pandemic, the only notable event Acha competed at in 2020 was the Indoor World Cup in France, where he placed fifth in the individual event.

In 2021, Acha won two team medals in the Archery World Cup: a gold in the first leg and a silver in the second. He teamed with Miguel Alvariño and Daniel Castro, beating the United States in the final to win their country's first gold medal in history of the event. That summer he competed at the 2021 European Championships. He won a gold medal in the individual event, defeating Galsan Bazarzhapov in the final. He also took home a silver medal partnering with Elia Canales in the mixed team event, ultimately losing to the Russian duo of Aldar Tsybikzhapov and Elena Osipova.

He won the silver medal in the men's team recurve event at the 2022 European Archery Championships held in Munich, Germany.

== Personal life ==
Originally from Burgos, Acha moved to Madrid for his training. He got his start in archery at the age of eight because his older brother was doing it and his uncle was president of a local archery club.

Acha is currently studying robotics and automation at the University of Burgos.
