= Michelle Kroppen =

German archer (born 1996)

Personal information
- Nationality: German
- Born: 19 April 1996 (age 30) Kevelaer, Germany

Sport
- Sport: Archery
Medal record
Women's recurve archery
Representing Germany
Olympic Games
Silver medal – second place	2024 Paris	Mixed team
Bronze medal – third place	2020 Tokyo	Team
World Championships
Gold medal – first place	2023 Berlin	Team
Silver medal – second place	2023 Berlin	Mixed team
European Games
Bronze medal – third place	2019 Minsk	Mixed team
Bronze medal – third place	2023 Kraków-Małopolska	Mixed team
European Championships
Gold medal – first place	2022 Munich	Team
Silver medal – second place	2021 Antalya	Team
Silver medal – second place	2022 Munich	Individual
Silver medal – second place	2022 Munich	Mixed team
Bronze medal – third place	2018 Legnica	Team

Michelle Kroppen (born 19 April 1996) is a German archer. She competed in the women's individual event, and women's team, at the 2020 Summer Olympics, winning a bronze medal.

== Career ==
At the 2018 European Archery Championships held in Legnica, Poland, she won the bronze medal in the women's team recurve event. She won the silver medal in the women's team recurve event at the 2021 European Archery Championships held in Antalya, Turkey.

In 2019, Kroppen and Cedric Rieger won the bronze medal in the mixed team recurve event at the European Games held in Minsk, Belarus. She also competed in the women's individual recurve and women's team recurve events.

Kroppen won the silver medal in the women's individual recurve event at the 2022 European Archery Championships held in Munich, Germany. She also won the gold medal in the women's team recurve event and the silver medal in the mixed team recurve event.
