= Robin Jäätma =

Estonian archer (born 2001)

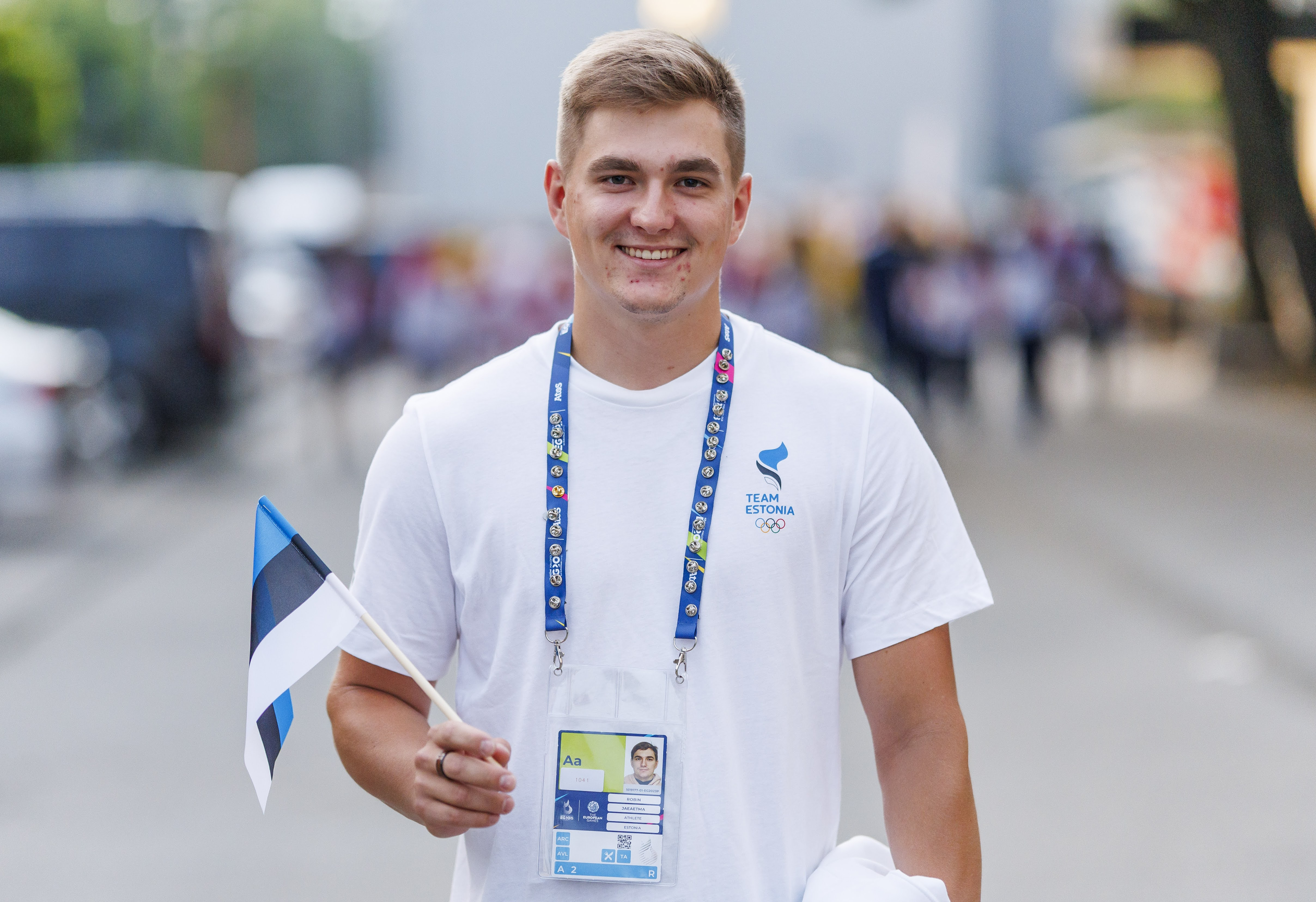
- Robin Jäätma (2023)

Personal information
- Born: 5 March 2001 (age 25) Paide, Estonia

Sport
- Country: Estonia
- Sport: Archery
- Event: Compound
Medal record
Men's compound archery
Representing Estonia
World Championships
Bronze medal – third place	2021 Yankton	Individual
European Games
Gold medal – first place	2023 Kraków-Małopolska	Mixed team
European Championships
Silver medal – second place	2021 Antalya	Mixed team
Silver medal – second place	2022 Munich	Mixed team
Bronze medal – third place	2022 Munich	Individual
World Cup
Silver medal – second place	2022 Gwangju	Mixed team
Silver medal – second place	2024 Shanghai	Mixed team
Bronze medal – third place	2023 Medellín	Mixed team
Bronze medal – third place	2025 Antalya	Mixed team
Bronze medal – third place	2026 Shanghai	Mixed team
Summer Universiade
Gold medal – first place	2019 Naples	Mixed team

Robin Jäätma (born 5 March 2001) is an Estonian archer competing in compound events. He won the bronze medal in the men's individual compound event at the 2021 World Archery Championships held in Yankton, United States. He became the first archer to win a medal for Estonia in the history of the World Archery Championships.

In 2019, Jäätma and his sister Lisell Jäätma won the gold medal in the mixed team compound event at the Summer Universiade held in Naples, Italy. They won the silver medal in the mixed team compound event at the 2021 European Archery Championships held in Antalya, Turkey. They also won the silver medal in this event at the 2022 European Archery Championships held in Munich, Germany. He also won the bronze medal in the men's individual compound event.

Jäätma represented Estonia at the 2022 World Games held in Birmingham, United States. He competed in the men's individual compound event. He also represented Estonia at the 2023 European Games held in Poland. Jäätma and Lisell Jäätma won the gold medal in the mixed team compound event. He also competed in the men's individual compound event.
