= Emircan Haney =

Turkish compound archer (born 2001)

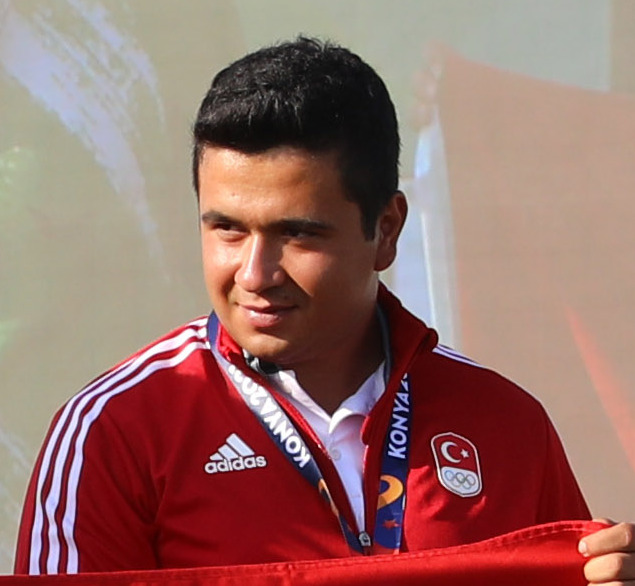

Personal information
- Nationality: Turkish
- Born: 1 January 2001 (age 25) Muğla, Turkey

Sport
- Country: Turkey
- Sport: Archery
- Event: compound
- Team: Muğla BB
Medal record
Men's compound archery
Representing Turkey
European Championships
Gold medal – first place	2022 Munich	Team
Silver medal – second place	2024 Essen	Team
Bronze medal – third place	2022 Munich	Mixed team
Bronze medal – third place	2024 Essen	Mixed team
World Cup
Gold medal – first place	2025 Nanjing	Individual
Gold medal – first place	2026 Shanghai	Team
Silver medal – second place	2022 Paris	Team
Silver medal – second place	2024 Yecheon	Team
Silver medal – second place	2024 Antalya	Team
Silver medal – second place	2025 Antalya	Team
Silver medal – second place	2025 Madrid	Individual
Silver medal – second place	2026 Puebla	Team
Silver medal – second place	2026 Shanghai	Mixed team
Bronze medal – third place	2023 Shanghai	Team
Bronze medal – third place	2025 Antalya	Individual
European Indoor Championships
Silver medal – second place	2022 Laško	Team
European Games
Bronze medal – third place	2023 Kraków	Individual
Islamic Solidarity Games
Gold medal – first place	2021 Konya	Mixed team
Bronze medal – third place	2021 Konya	Individual

Emircan Haney (born 1 January 2001) is a Turkish male compound archer and part of the national team.

== Sport career ==
In 2022, Emircan Haney won the gold medal in the men's team compound event at the European Archery Championships held in Munich, Germany. He also won the silver medal in the mixed Team event. Completing the podium were the Turkish pair Yesim Bostan and Emircan Haney, who defeated Belgium's Sarah Prieels and Quinten van Looy 156–155. He won the silver medal in the men's team compound event at the Laško, Slovenia event in the 2022 European Indoor Archery Championships.

At the 3rd European Games held at the Plaszowianka Archery Park in Kraków, Poland, he defeated his French rival Nicolas Girard 147–141 in the quarter-finals of the men's individual competition of the roller bow and advanced to the semi-finals. He was defeated by Jozef Bosansky of Slovakia 147–145 in the semifinals. He faced Lukasz Przybylski of Poland in the third place match. He defeated his opponent 149-146 and won the bronze medal.
