= Charline Schwarz =

German archer (born 2001)

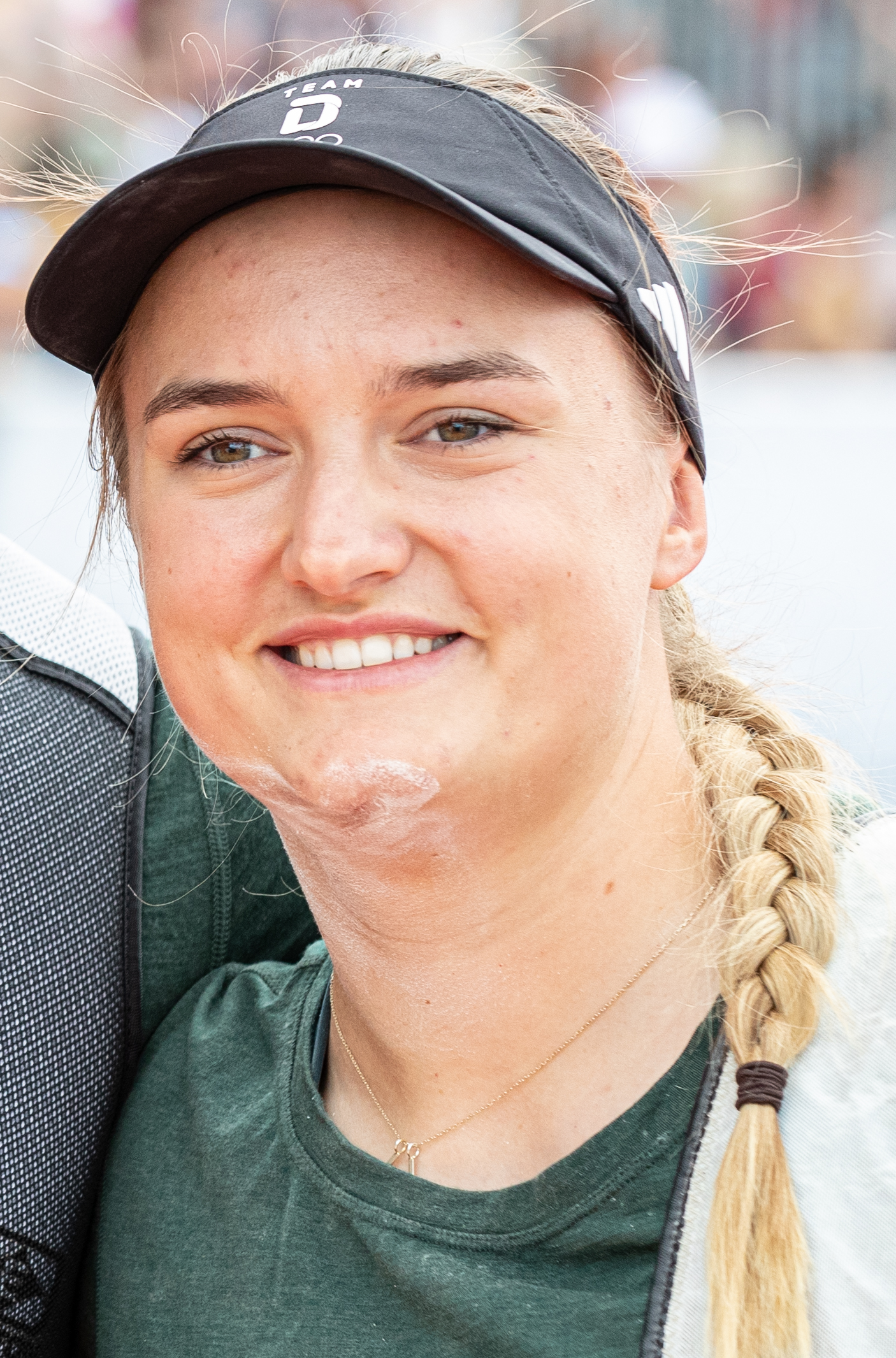
- Charline Schwarz in 2025

Personal information
- Nationality: German
- Born: 15 January 2001 (age 25) Nürnberg

Sport
- Sport: Archery
Medal record
Women's recurve archery
Representing Germany
Olympic Games
Bronze medal – third place	2020 Tokyo	Team
World Championships
Gold medal – first place	2023 Berlin	Team
European Championships
Gold medal – first place	2022 Munich	Team
Gold medal – first place	2026 Antalya	Team
Silver medal – second place	2021 Antalya	Team
Bronze medal – third place	2024 Essen	Team

Charline Schwarz (born 15 January 2001) is a German archer. She competed in the women's individual event at the 2020 Summer Olympics in Tokyo, Japan, and she won the bronze medal in the women's team event.

In 2021, Schwarz won the silver medal in the women's team recurve event at the European Archery Championships held in Antalya, Turkey.

Schwarz won the gold medal in the women's team recurve event at the 2022 European Archery Championships held in Munich, Germany.
