= Dobromira Danailova =

Bulgarian archer (born 1995)

Personal information
- Born: 24 October 1995 (age 30)

Sport
- Country: Bulgaria
- Sport: Archery
- Event: recurve
- Updated on 10 September 2015

Dobromira Danailova (Bulgarian: Добромира Данаилова) (born 24 October 1995) is a Bulgarian recurve archer. She competed in the individual recurve event at the 2015 World Archery Championships in Copenhagen, Denmark, finishing in 113th position overall after being eliminated in the 1/48 round.
