= Natalia Leśniak =

Polish archer (born 1991)

Natalia Leśniak (born 10 July 1991 in Sucha Beskidzka) is a Polish archer. Her family include parents, Zdzislaw Lesniak and Urszula Lesniak, and her siblings Adrian Lesniak (35) and Daniel Lesniak (27). Natalia's love for archery started at the age of 9. She competed in the individual event at the 2012 Summer Olympics.

She finished second in the 2016 World Indoor Archery Championships, and the 2015 European Field Archery Championships. In 2016, she was also part of the Polish team (with Karina Lipiarska and Wioleta Myszor) that won silver at the World Indoor Championship, having won bronze in 2014 in Nîmes.
