= Oleksii Hunbin =

Ukrainian archer (born 1992)

Personal information
- Born: 8 November 1992 (age 33) Sumy, Ukraine
- Height: 1.86 m (6 ft 1 in)
- Weight: 97 kg (214 lb)

Sport
- Country: Ukraine
- Sport: Archery
- Event: Recurve
- Club: Dynamo
- Coached by: Yevhen Harkusha
Medal record
Men's archery
Representing Ukraine
World Indoor Championships
Bronze medal – third place	2018 Yankton	Team
European Archery Championships
Silver medal – second place	2021 Antalya	Team
European Indoor Championships
Silver medal – second place	2026 Plovdiv	Individual
- Updated on 22 July 2021

Oleksii Ihorovych Hunbin (Ukrainian: Олексій Ігорович Гунбін; born 8 November 1992 in Sumy, Ukraine) is a Ukrainian archer. He represented Ukraine at the 2020 Summer Olympics in men's individual and mixed team competition. He won silver medal at the 2021 European Championships in team event.

== Career ==
Hunbin started archery in 2010 and is now sports master of international class. He is righthanded.

Hunbin participated at the 2017 Summer Universiade in Taipei, where he reached quarterfinals in individual competition and round of 16 in both men's and mixed team competitions. That year he also participated at the World Championships in Mexico City where he was just 57th in individual competition. Two years later he achieved the same result at the 2019 Worlds.

The first international success for Hunbin came in 2018 when he together with Heorhiy Ivanytskyy and Olympic champion Viktor Ruban was third in men's team competition at the World Indoor Championships in Yankton. The Netherlands became then champions, and Australia was second. In individual competition, he was 7th. After that he also was 8th at the 2018 European Championships in Legnica, where he lost to Netherlands' Steve Wijler in quarterfinals, who later became European champion.

During the 2019 Archery World Cup, Hunbin together with Heorhiy Ivanytskyy and Sergii Makarevych won silver medals in team competition in Berlin where the 4th stage of the World Cup was held. They lost to Turkey in the final. This was the only medal for Ukraine in that season.

The 2021 European Archery Championships, which was held in Antalya, brought Hunbin his first continental medal. Together with Heorhiy Ivanytskyy and Ivan Kozhokar, he won silver medal in team competition. Ukraine lost to the Netherlands in the final. In individual competition he was 33rd.

At the Final Olympic Qualification Tournament, held in Paris, Hunbin reached semifinal and ranked 4th, thus securing an Olympic spot for Ukraine. Since he defeated his team fellow Heorhiy Ivanytskyy in the quarterfinal, he was chosen by the national team management to represent Ukraine at the 2020 Summer Olympics. At that tournament Ukraine men's team also ranked 4th, but it wasn't enough to qualify a team for Tokyo.

Hunbin finished 28th in the qualification at the 2020 Summer Olympics. In the first round he lost 4-6 to two-time World Championships medalist in team events Tarundeep Rai from India. He was nominated together with Veronika Marchenko for mixed team event, but they did not qualify for the play-off stage after ranking 18th in qualification, 6 points behind last qualified team.

== Personal life ==
Hunbin is married. He graduated from Sumy State University. His hobbies include intellectual games, computer games, watching movies.
