= Reena Pärnat =

Estonian archer (born 1993)

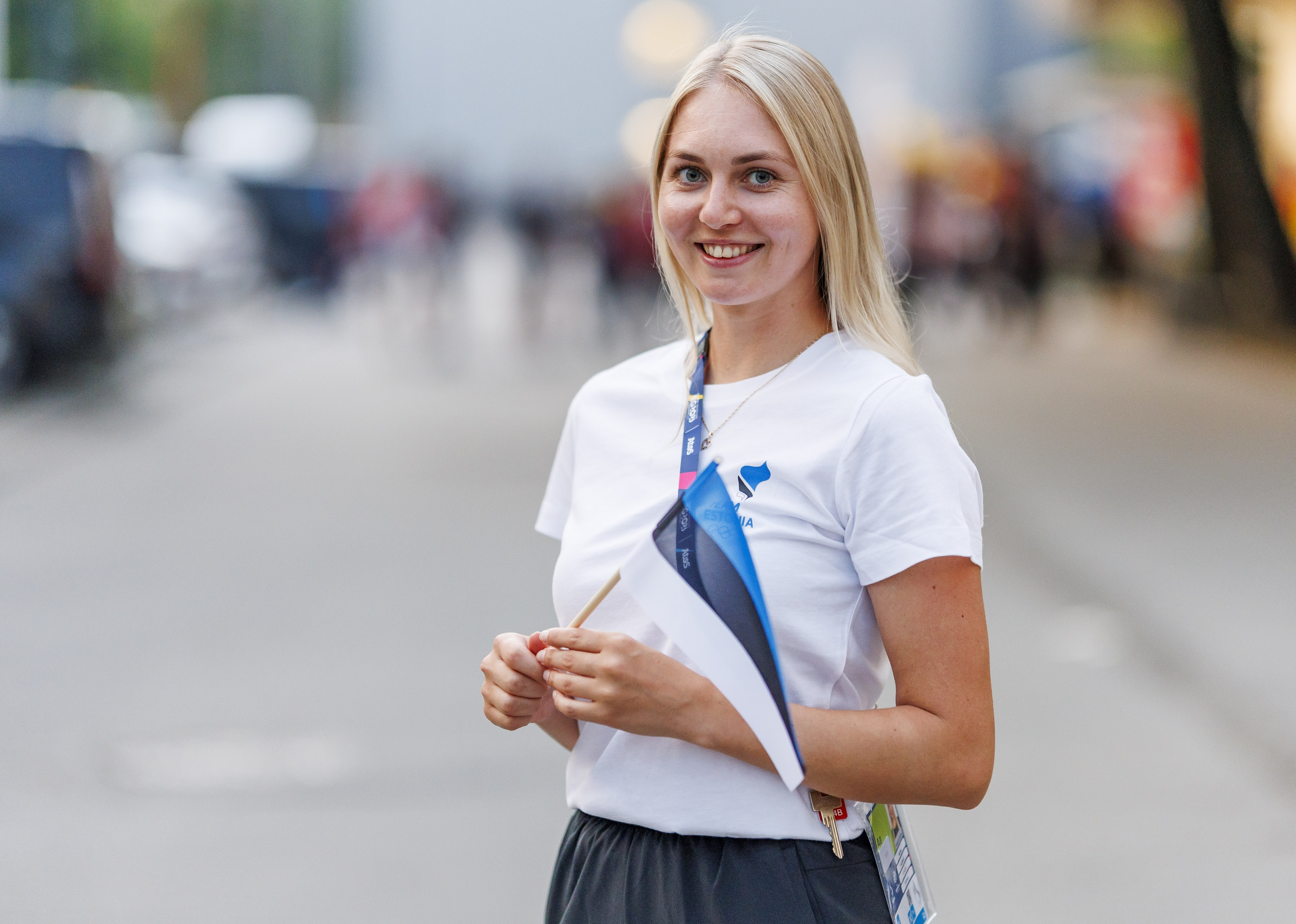
- Reena Pärnat in 2023

Personal information
- Born: 1 December 1993 (age 32) Pärnu, Estonia

Sport
- Country: Estonia
- Sport: Archery

Reena Pärnat (born 1 December 1993) is an Estonian archer who competed at the 2012 Summer Olympics. She was born in Pärnu. scored 621 points from 720 in the preliminary ranking round of the women's individual event, which determined the seedings for the subsequent elimination rounds, placing 52nd of the 64 competitors. She was eliminated in the first round of the competition by Mexico's Alejandra Valencia.

Pärnat later contested the 2015 Summer Universiade in Gwangju while enrolled at the University of Tartu. Her eighth-place finish in the women's individual event represented the highest ever position achieved by an Estonian archer at the Games. In 2018 she became the first Estonian to win a World Archery Federation-sanctioned tournament whose results contributed to the World Archery Rankings.
