= Denisa Baránková =

Slovak archer (2001–2026)

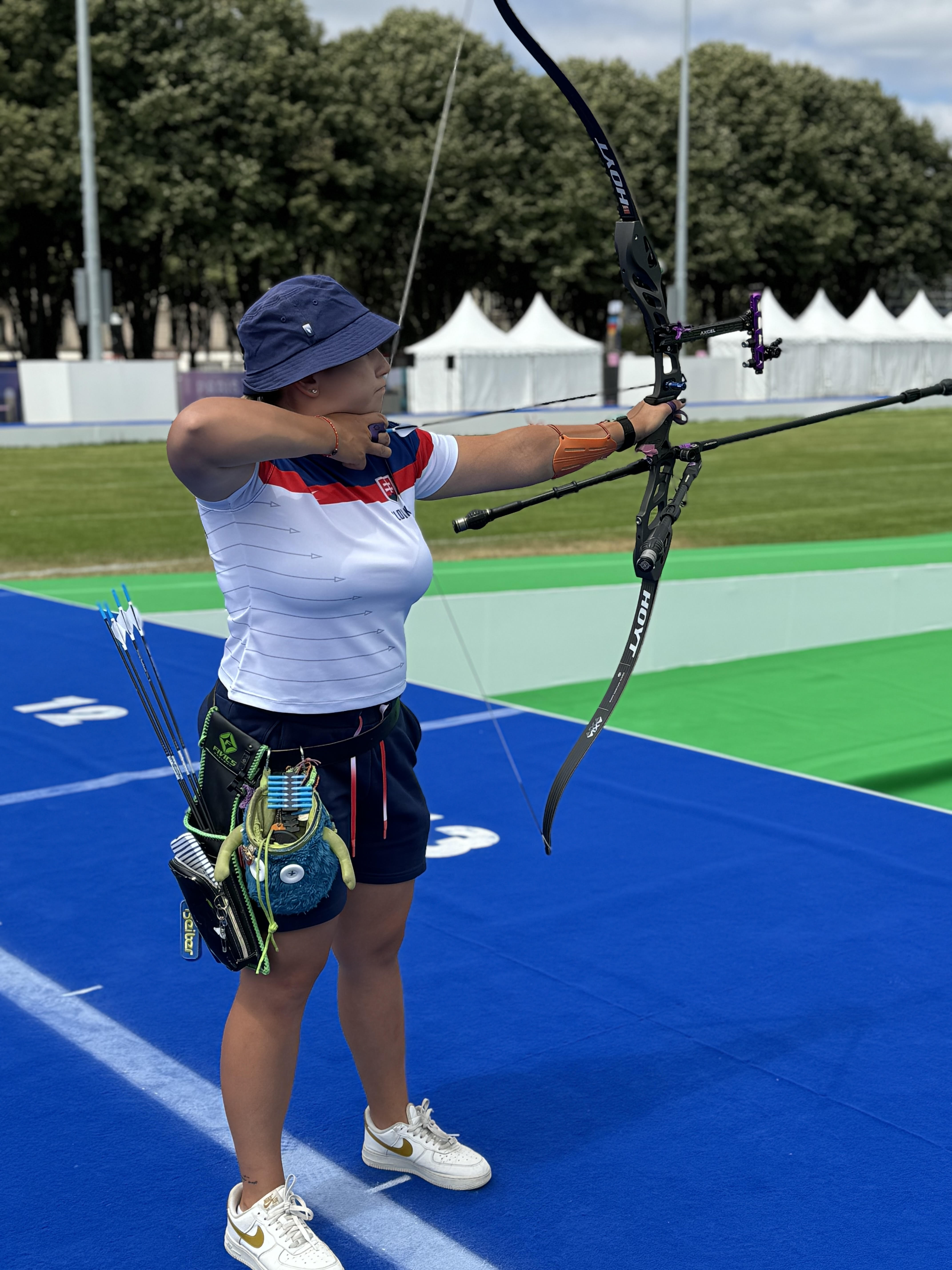
- Baránková at Paris 2024 Olympics

Personal information
- Nationality: Slovak
- Born: 7 September 2001 Bratislava, Slovakia
- Died: 22 June 2026 (aged 24) Bratislava, Slovakia
- Height: 1.61 m (5 ft 3 in)
- Weight: 70 kg (154 lb)

Sport
- Sport: Archery
- Event: Recurve
- Club: LK Bratislava
- Coached by: Vladimír Hurban
Medal record
Women's recurve archery
Representing Slovakia
World Games
Gold medal – first place	2025 Chengdu	Individual
European Archery Championships
Bronze medal – third place	2021 Antalya	Individual
European Indoor Archery Championships
Silver medal – second place	2024 Samsun	Team
European Field Archery Championships
Silver medal – second place	2023 San Sicario	Individual
Silver medal – second place	2021 Porec	Individual

Denisa Hurban Baránková (7 September 2001 – 22 June 2026) was a Slovak archer. She won the gold medal in the women's individual recurve event at the 2025 World Games held in Chengdu, China. She competed in the women's individual event at the 2020 Summer Olympics.

== Career ==
Baránková made her debut in the Slovak national team in 2017 and subsequently competed at numerous international tournaments such as the 2019 European Games. At the 2021 European Field championship she became first Slovak archer to ever qualify for the World Games.

She represented Slovakia at the 2022 World Games held in Birmingham, United States. She competed in the women's individual recurve event.

Baránková represented Slovakia at the 2024 Summer Olympics in Paris in the Women's individual event. During the ranking round she was seeded 48th and was knocked out in the elimination round by Amélie Cordeau 3–7.

Baránková married her personal trainer, Vladimír Hurban, in October 2025. Six years her senior, Hurban had been her coach at her previous two appearances at the Summer Olympics.

== Death ==
Baránková died on 22 June 2026, at the age of 24. She died in Kramáre Hospital in Bratislava, following a pedestrian-vehicle collision at Osuského Street in Petržalka, being hit by a vehicle, which had gone out of control after firefighters had freed it from under a tree that had fallen on it during a windstorm. Her funeral was attended by over 300 people.
