= 2022 European Archery Championships – Men's team compound =

Archery competition

Men's Team Compound at the 2022 European Archery Championships
- Location: Munich, Germany
- Dates: 7–11 June
- Competitors: 63 from 21 nations
- Teams: 21

Medalists
| gold medal | Batuhan Akçaoğlu; Emircan Haney; Yakup Yıldız | Turkey |
| silver medal | Sil Pater; Mike Schloesser; Stef Willems | Netherlands |
| bronze medal | Stefan Heincz; Michael Matzner; Nico Wiener | Austria |

The men's team compound competition at the 2022 European Archery Championships took place from 7 to 11 June in Munich, Germany.

== Qualification round ==
Results after 216 arrows.

| Rank | Nation | Name | Score | 10+X | X |
|---|---|---|---|---|---|
| 1 | Denmark | Martin Damsbo; Mathias Fullerton; Stephan Hansen | 2118 | 175 | 79 |
| 2 | Turkey | Batuhan Akçaoğlu; Emircan Haney; Yakup Yıldız | 2115 | 171 | 86 |
| 3 | Austria | Stefan Heincz; Michael Matzner; Nico Wiener | 2106 | 165 | 86 |
| 4 | France | Quentin Baraër; Jean-Philippe Boulch; Adrien Gontier | 2106 | 164 | 77 |
| 5 | Germany | Sebastian Hamdorf; Leon Hollas; Henning Lüpkemann | 2101 | 159 | 62 |
| 6 | Italy | Marco Bruno; Valerio Della Stua; Elia Fragnan | 2094 | 152 | 67 |
| 7 | Estonia | Kristjan Ilves; Robin Jäätma; Evert Ressar | 2093 | 158 | 74 |
| 8 | Great Britain | James Mason; Adam Ravenscroft; Stuart Taylor | 2092 | 150 | 67 |
| 9 | Slovenia | Aljaž Matija Brenk; Tim Jevšnik; Staš Modic | 2090 | 150 | 64 |
| 10 | Portugal | Cláudio Alves; Carlos Resende; Nuno Simões | 2083 | 144 | 45 |
| 11 | Sweden | Jacob Benschjöld; Stefan Hansson; Joakim Limås | 2079 | 143 | 63 |
| 12 | Netherlands | Sil Pater; Mike Schloesser; Stef Willems | 2078 | 152 | 71 |
| 13 | Greece | Dimitrios-Konstantinos Drakiotis; Athanasios Kostopoulos; Stavros Koumertas | 2078 | 144 | 61 |
| 14 | Slovakia | Jozef Bošanský; Šimon Šedivý; Samuel Zeman | 2076 | 138 | 64 |
| 15 | Norway | Anders Faugstad; Mads Haugseth; Trym Isnes | 2071 | 137 | 52 |
| 16 | Poland | Krzysztof Gorczyca; Przemysław Konecki; Łukasz Przybylski | 2069 | 130 | 47 |
| 17 | Finland | Antti Peltoniemi; Matti Tella; Vili Toivanen | 2065 | 133 | 52 |
| 18 | Luxembourg | Arnaud Hocevar; Ben Moes; Gilles Seywert | 2060 | 128 | 51 |
| 19 | Czech Republic | Filip Reitmeier; Martin Vaněk; Pavel Zaoral | 2050 | 116 | 45 |
| 20 | Lithuania | Rolandas Baranauskas; Remigijus Bileišis; Vladas Šigauskas | 1981 | 91 | 31 |
| 21 | Iceland | Alfreð Birgisson; Dagur Örn Fannarsson; Albert Ólafsson | 1939 | 68 | 23 |

== Elimination round ==
1/12 finals
17 | Finland | 224
16 | Poland | 222
21 | Iceland | 211
12 | Netherlands | 238
13 | Greece | 232
20 | Lithuania | 224
19 | Czech Republic | 223
14 | Slovakia | 228
15 | Norway | 230
18 | Luxembourg | 218

1/8 finals
1 | Denmark | 232
17 | Finland | 218
9 | Slovenia | 230
8 | Great Britain | 226
5 | Germany | 223
12 | Netherlands | 226
13 | Greece | 228
4 | France | 226
3 | Austria | 230
14 | Slovakia | 226
11 | Sweden | 224
6 | Italy | 226
7 | Estonia | 221
10 | Portugal | 222
15 | Norway | 221
2 | Turkey | 225

Quarterfinals
1 | Denmark | 230
9 | Slovenia | 235
12 | Netherlands | 233
13 | Greece | 229
3 | Austria | 234
6 | Italy | 230
10 | Portugal | 227
2 | Turkey | 235

Semifinals
9 | Slovenia | 235
12 | Netherlands | 236
3 | Austria | 232^{28}
2 | Turkey | 232^{30}

Final
12 | Netherlands | 230
2 | Turkey | 238
Third place
9 | Slovenia | 227
3 | Austria | 233
