= 2021 World Archery Championships – Women's individual compound =

Women's Archery event

2021 World Archery Championships
Men	Recurve	Compound
Women	Recurve	Compound
Team	Men's recurve	Men's compound
Team	Women's recurve	Women's compound
Mixed team	Recurve	Compound

The women's individual compound competition at the 2021 World Archery Championships took place from 21 to 25 September in Yankton, United States.

== Schedule ==
All times are Central Daylight Time (UTC−05:00).

Date	Time	Round
Tuesday, 21 September	09:00	Qualification round
Thursday, 23 September	09:15; 10:15; 11:00; 11:40	1/48 finals 1/24 finals 1/16 finals 1/8 finals
Saturday, 25 September	10:02; 10:50; 11:19; 11:31	Quarterfinals; Semifinals; Bronze medal match Final

== Qualification round ==
Results after 72 arrows.

Rank	Name	Nation	Score	10+X	X
1	Sara López	Colombia	693	50	15
2	Ella Gibson	United Kingdom	692	45	18
3	Alejandra Usquiano	Colombia	691	46	13
4	Toja Ellison	Slovenia	689	49	21
5	Andrea Marcos	Spain	688	43	16
6	Jyothi Surekha Vennam	India	684	38	20
7	Tanja Gellenthien	Denmark	683	42	15
8	Sarah Prieels	Belgium	683	41	15
9	Sanne de Laat	Netherlands	680	35	9
10	Andrea Becerra	Mexico	679	38	18
11	Yeşim Bostan	Turkey	678	32	15
12	Natalia Avdeeva	Russian Archery Federation	677	35	15
13	Paige Pearce	United States	677	34	11
14	Kim Yun-hee	South Korea	676	37	9
15	Linda Ochoa-Anderson	United States	675	34	15
16	Sophie Dodemont	France	674	36	17
17	Nora Valdez	Colombia	674	34	17
18	Layla Annison	United Kingdom	672	37	12
19	Amanda Mlinarić	Croatia	672	34	16
20	Tiphaine Renaudin	France	672	32	14
21	Marcella Tonioli	Italy	671	34	14
22	So Chae-won	South Korea	671	31	10
23	Danelle Lutz	South Africa	670	29	8
24	Elizaveta Knyazeva	Russian Archery Federation	667	32	9
25	Makenna Proctor	United States	667	30	12
26	Lola Grandjean	France	665	26	10
27	Viktoria Balzhanova	Russian Archery Federation	664	29	14
28	Meeri-Marita Paas	Estonia	664	28	8
29	Muskan Kirar	India	664	26	8
30	Lin Ming-ching	Chinese Taipei	664	24	4
31	Maris Tetsmann	Estonia	663	34	8
32	Martina Zikmundová	Czech Republic	663	29	11
33	Ayşe Bera Süzer	Turkey	662	36	13
34	Song Yun-soo	South Korea	660	28	14
35	Oleksandra Hrabik	Ukraine	659	30	14
36	Isabelle Carpenter	United Kingdom	659	27	10
37	Mariya Shkolna	Luxembourg	659	25	13
38	Inge van der Ven	Netherlands	657	26	8
39	María José Zebadúa	Guatemala	657	25	6
40	Jennifer Walter	Germany	656	26	10
41	Martine Stas-Couwenberg	Netherlands	655	29	4
42	Erika Damsbo	Denmark	654	24	11
43	Lisell Jäätma	Estonia	653	25	8
44	Gizem Elmaağaçlı	Turkey	653	24	13
45	Liu Shu-ting	Chinese Taipei	652	25	9
46	Natacha Stütz	Denmark	652	22	12
47	Carolin Landesfeind	Germany	651	26	10
48	Julia Böhnke	Germany	651	24	8
49	Brenda Merino	Mexico	650	25	6
50	Paola Natale	Italy	648	18	9
51	Priya Gurjar	India	646	25	8
52	Fiona McClean	Canada	645	26	8
53	Elisa Roner	Italy	643	24	11
54	Kseniia Shkliar	Ukraine	643	23	9
55	Esmeralda Sánchez	Mexico	640	30	10
56	Anna María Alfreðsdóttir	Iceland	640	19	7
57	Hsu Chi-huei	Chinese Taipei	636	21	6
58	Etsuko Miyata	Japan	631	17	9
59	Anuradha Wijesinghe Karunaratne	Sri Lanka	622	15	2
60	Johana Horta De Oliveira	Portugal	621	20	7
61	Giselle Pauline Zaandam De Sousa	Portugal	621	13	3
62	Harshani Shashikala Kumarasinghe	Sri Lanka	613	19	4
63	Rita Pereira	Portugal	602	13	5
64	Mungunchimeg Batjargal	Mongolia	599	11	4
65	Bolorsaikhan Sanj	Mongolia	578	14	2
66	Astrid Barría	Panama	571	6	2

== Elimination round ==
=== Section 1 ===
1/48 finals
1	(Colombia) Sara López
Bye
33	(Turkey) Ayşe Bera Süzer
Bye
Bye
32	(Czech Republic) Martina Zikmundová
17	(Colombia) Nora Valdez
Bye
65	(Mongolia) Bolorsaikhan Sanj	122
48	(Germany) Julia Böhnke	140
49	(Mexico) Brenda Merino	140
64	(Mongolia) Mungunchimeg Batjargal	139
Bye
16	(France) Sophie Dodemont
9	(Netherlands) Sanne de Laat
Bye
57	(Chinese Taipei) Hsu Chi-huei	137
56	(Iceland) Anna María Alfreðsdóttir	134
41	(Netherlands) Martine Stas-Couwenberg
Bye
Bye
24	Elizaveta Knyazeva
25	(United States) Makenna Proctor
Bye
Bye
40	(Germany) Jennifer Walter
Bye
8	(Belgium) Sarah Prieels

1/24 finals
1	(Colombia) Sara López
Bye
33	(Turkey) Ayşe Bera Süzer	146
32	(Czech Republic) Martina Zikmundová	144
17	(Colombia) Nora Valdez	144
48	(Germany) Julia Böhnke	138
49	(Mexico) Brenda Merino	141
16	(France) Sophie Dodemont	142
9	(Netherlands) Sanne de Laat	144
57	(Chinese Taipei) Hsu Chi-huei	143
41	(Netherlands) Martine Stas-Couwenberg	143
24	Elizaveta Knyazeva	145
25	(United States) Makenna Proctor	143
40	(Germany) Jennifer Walter	134
Bye
8	(Belgium) Sarah Prieels

1/16 finals
1	(Colombia) Sara López	148
33	(Turkey) Ayşe Bera Süzer	142
17	(Colombia) Nora Valdez	143
16	(France) Sophie Dodemont	138
9	(Netherlands) Sanne de Laat	144
24	Elizaveta Knyazeva	141
25	(United States) Makenna Proctor	141
8	(Belgium) Sarah Prieels	143

1/8 finals
1	(Colombia) Sara López	145
17	(Colombia) Nora Valdez	144
9	(Netherlands) Sanne de Laat	144^{9}
8	(Belgium) Sarah Prieels	144^{X}

Quarterfinals
1	(Colombia) Sara López	146^{10+}
8	(Belgium) Sarah Prieels	146^{10}

=== Section 2 ===
1/48 finals
5	(Spain) Andrea Marcos
Bye
37	(Luxembourg) Mariya Shkolna
Bye
Bye
28	(Estonia) Meeri-Marita Paas
21	(Italy) Marcella Tonioli
Bye
Bye
44	(Turkey) Gizem Elmaağaçlı
53	(Italy) Elisa Roner	147
60	(Portugal) Johana Horta De Oliveira	124
Bye
12	Natalia Avdeeva
13	(United States) Paige Pearce
Bye
61	(Portugal) Giselle Pauline Zaandam De Sousa	140
52	(Canada) Fiona McClean	139
45	(Chinese Taipei) Liu Shu-ting
Bye
Bye
20	(France) Tiphaine Renaudin
29	(India) Muskan Kirar
Bye
Bye
36	(United Kingdom) Isabelle Carpenter
Bye
4	(Slovenia) Toja Ellison

1/24 finals
1	(Spain) Andrea Marcos
Bye
37	(Luxembourg) Mariya Shkolna	137
28	(Estonia) Meeri-Marita Paas	145
21	(Italy) Marcella Tonioli	147
44	(Turkey) Gizem Elmaağaçlı	146
48	(Italy) Elisa Roner	140
12	Natalia Avdeeva	148
13	(United States) Paige Pearce	147
61	(Portugal) Giselle Pauline Zaandam De Sousa	140
45	(Chinese Taipei) Liu Shu-ting	140
20	(France) Tiphaine Renaudin	141
29	(India) Muskan Kirar	144
36	(United Kingdom) Isabelle Carpenter	142
Bye
4	(Slovenia) Toja Ellison

1/16 finals
1	(Spain) Andrea Marcos	140
28	(Estonia) Meeri-Marita Paas	141
21	(Italy) Marcella Tonioli	141
12	Natalia Avdeeva	142
13	(United States) Paige Pearce	142
20	(France) Tiphaine Renaudin	140
29	(India) Muskan Kirar	139
4	(Slovenia) Toja Ellison	145

1/8 finals
28	(Estonia) Meeri-Marita Paas	144
17	Natalia Avdeeva	145
13	(United States) Paige Pearce	144
4	(Slovenia) Toja Ellison	145

Quarterfinals
17	Natalia Avdeeva	145
4	(Slovenia) Toja Ellison	147

=== Section 3 ===
1/48 finals
3	(Colombia) A Usquiano
Bye
35	(Ukraine) Oleksandra Hrabik
Bye
Bye
30	(Chinese Taipei) Lin Ming-ching
19	(Croatia) Amanda Mlinarić
Bye
Bye
46	(Denmark) Natacha Stütz
51	(India) Priya Gurjar	145
62	(Sri Lanka) Shashikala Kumarasinghe	132
Bye
14	(South Korea) Kim Yun-hee
11	(Turkey) Yeşim Bostan
Bye
59	(Sri Lanka) Anuradha Wijesinghe Karunaratne	137
54	(Ukraine) Kseniia Shkliar	146
43	(Estonia) Lisell Jäätma
Bye
Bye
22	(South Korea) So Chae-won
27	Viktoria Balzhanova
Bye
Bye
38	(Netherlands) Inge van der Ven
Bye
6	(India) Jyothi Surekha Vennam

1/24 finals
3	(Colombia) Alejandra Usquiano
Bye
35	(Ukraine) Oleksandra Hrabik	145
30	(Chinese Taipei) Lin Ming-ching	143
19	(Croatia) Amanda Mlinarić	146
46	(Denmark) Natacha Stütz	140
51	(India) Priya Gurjar	149
14	(South Korea) Kim Yun-hee	145
11	(Turkey) Yeşim Bostan	145^{9}
54	(Ukraine) Kseniia Shkliar	145^{9+}
43	(Estonia) Lisell Jäätma	144
20	(South Korea) So Chae-won	149
27	Viktoria Balzhanova	141
38	(Netherlands) Inge van der Ven	142
Bye
6	(India) Jyothi Surekha Vennam

1/16 finals
3	(Colombia) Alejandra Usquiano	144
35	(Ukraine) Oleksandra Hrabik	142
19	(Croatia) Amanda Mlinarić	141
51	(India) Priya Gurjar	138
54	(Ukraine) Kseniia Shkliar	140
20	(South Korea) So Chae-won	145
38	(Netherlands) Inge van der Ven	144
6	(India) Jyothi Surekha Vennam	147

1/8 finals
3	(Colombia) Alejandra Usquiano	144
19	(Croatia) Amanda Mlinarić	147
20	(South Korea) So Chae-won	142
6	(India) Jyothi Surekha Vennam	146

Quarterfinals
19	(Croatia) Amanda Mlinarić	144
6	(India) Jyothi Surekha Vennam	150

=== Section 4 ===
1/48 finals
7	(Denmark) Tanja Gellenthien
Bye
39	(Guatemala) MJ Zebadúa
Bye
Bye
26	(France) L Grandjean
23	(South Africa) Danelle Lutz
Bye
Bye
42	(Denmark) Erika Damsbo
55	(Mexico) Esmeralda Sánchez	143
58	(Japan) Etsuko Miyata	139
Bye
10	(Mexico) Andrea Becerra
15	(United States) Linda Ochoa-Anderson
Bye
63	(Portugal) Rita Pereira	134
50	(Italy) Paola Natale	144
47	(Germany) Carolin Landesfeind	137
66	(Panama) Astrid Barría	130
Bye
18	(United Kingdom) Layla Annison
31	(Estonia) Maris Tetsmann
Bye
Bye
34	(South Korea) Song Yun-soo
Bye
2	(United Kingdom) Ella Gibson

1/24 finals
7	(Denmark) Tanja Gellenthien
Bye
39	(Guatemala) María José Zebadúa	142
26	(France) Lola Grandjean	146
23	(South Africa) Danelle Lutz	142
42	(Denmark) Erika Damsbo	137
55	(Mexico) Esmeralda Sánchez	144
10	(Mexico) Andrea Becerra	146
15	(United States) Linda Ochoa-Anderson	142
50	(Italy) Paola Natale	137
47	(Germany) Carolin Landesfeind	144
18	(United Kingdom) Layla Annison	143
31	(Estonia) Maris Tetsmann	142
34	(South Korea) Song Yun-soo	148
Bye
2	(United Kingdom) Ella Gibson

1/16 finals
7	(Denmark) Tanja Gellenthien	142
26	(France) Lola Grandjean	141
23	(South Africa) Danelle Lutz	142
10	(Mexico) Andrea Becerra	146
15	(United States) Linda Ochoa-Anderson	142
47	(Germany) Carolin Landesfeind	134
34	(South Korea) Song Yun-soo	146
2	(United Kingdom) Ella Gibson	144

1/8 finals
7	(Denmark) Tanja Gellenthien	143
10	(Mexico) Andrea Becerra	146
15	(United States) Linda Ochoa-Anderson	141
34	(South Korea) Song Yun-soo	145

Quarterfinals
10	(Mexico) Andrea Becerra	143^{9+}
34	(South Korea) Song Yun-soo	143^{9}

== Final round ==
Semifinals
1	(Colombia) Sara López	150
4	(Slovenia) Toja Ellison	147
6	(India) Jyothi Surekha Vennam	148
10	(Mexico) Andrea Becerra	146

Finals
1	(Colombia) Sara López	146
6	(India) Jyothi Surekha Vennam	144
Third place
4	(Slovenia) Toja Ellison	146^{9}
10	(Mexico) Andrea Becerra	146^{9+}
