= 2021 World Archery Championships – Women's individual recurve =

Archery competition

2021 World Archery Championships
Men	Recurve	Compound
Women	Recurve	Compound
Team	Men's recurve	Men's compound
Team	Women's recurve	Women's compound
Mixed team	Recurve	Compound

The women's individual recurve competition at the 2021 World Archery Championships took place from 21 to 26 September in Yankton, United States.

== Schedule ==
All times are Central Daylight Time (UTC−05:00).

Date	Time	Round
Tuesday, 21 September	09:00	Qualification round
Thursday, 23 September	15:00; 16:00; 16:45; 17:25	1/48 finals 1/24 finals 1/16 finals 1/8 finals
Sunday, 26 September	10:02; 10:50; 11:19; 11:31	Quarterfinals; Semifinals; Bronze medal match Final

== Qualification round ==
Results after 72 arrows.

Rank	Name	Nation	Score	10+X	X
1	An San	South Korea	646	22	10
2	Alejandra Valencia	Mexico	644	25	6
3	Jang Min-hee	South Korea	642	20	4
4	Kang Chae-young	South Korea	640	20	3
5	Casey Kaufhold	United States	639	23	8
6	Lisa Barbelin	France	638	23	8
7	Elena Osipova	Russian Archery Federation	636	17	8
8	Aída Román	Mexico	635	19	4
9	Katharina Bauer	Germany	633	19	6
10	Elia Canales	Spain	633	16	6
11	Laura van der Winkel	Netherlands	629	12	2
12	Mélodie Richard	France	628	22	6
13	Alexandra Mirca	Moldova	625	21	5
14	Bryony Pitman	United Kingdom	625	17	5
15	Gabriela Schloesser	Netherlands	625	15	4
16	Marie Horáčková	Czech Republic	625	15	4
17	Lucilla Boari	Italy	624	19	6
18	Michelle Kroppen	Germany	624	18	3
19	Inna Stepanova	Russian Archery Federation	624	17	4
20	Ankita Bhakat	India	623	16	5
21	Randi Degn	Denmark	622	18	10
22	Miki Nakamura	Japan	621	21	4
23	Svetlana Gomboeva	Russian Archery Federation	620	12	3
24	Yasemin Anagöz	Turkey	618	12	6
25	Lu Dai-ling	Chinese Taipei	617	16	3
26	Ridhi	India	617	12	6
27	Yulia Larkins	United Kingdom	615	18	8
28	Veronika Marchenko	Ukraine	615	13	5
29	Komalika Bari	India	614	16	4
30	Lidiia Sichenikova	Ukraine	613	15	6
31	Gabrielle Sasai	United States	613	14	1
32	Büşranur Coşkun	Turkey	611	15	10
33	Karyna Dziominskaya	Belarus	610	10	3
34	Ana Vázquez	Mexico	608	16	3
35	Ane Marcelle dos Santos	Brazil	608	15	7
36	Elisa Tartler	Germany	607	13	5
37	Lin Chia-en	Chinese Taipei	607	12	2
38	Ana Rendón	Colombia	607	7	1
39	Tomomi Sugimoto	Japan	606	19	5
40	Natalia Leśniak	Poland	605	15	4
41	Denisa Baránková	Slovakia	605	14	4
42	Sylwia Zyzańska	Poland	605	12	1
43	Karyna Kazlouskaya	Belarus	604	15	7
44	Jennifer Mucino-Fernandez	United States	603	10	2
45	Ana Machado	Brazil	601	10	2
46	Polina Rodionova	Ukraine	599	12	3
47	Caroline Lopez	France	598	14	3
48	Chiara Rebagliati	Italy	598	12	4
49	Penny Healey	United Kingdom	597	16	1
50	Mao Watanabe	Japan	596	10	3
51	Sarah Nikitin	Brazil	596	9	3
52	Alexandra Longová	Slovakia	596	9	1
53	Mădălina Amăistroaie	Romania	595	13	2
54	Vanessa Landi	Italy	595	12	2
55	Wioleta Myszor	Poland	595	10	5
56	Ana Umer	Slovenia	594	14	3
57	Triinu Lilienthal	Estonia	591	16	3
58	Leyre Fernández Infante	Spain	591	13	4
59	Hanna Marusava	Belarus	591	13	2
60	Milana Tkachenko	Portugal	581	11	2
61	Špela Ferš	Slovenia	580	8	1
62	Inés de Velasco	Spain	580	7	2
63	Asel Sharbekova	Kyrgyzstan	578	11	1
64	Elisabeth Straka	Austria	571	9	4
65	Ankhbayaryn Otgonjargal	Mongolia	571	5	2
66	Tania Edwards	Canada	565	10	3
67	Stephanie Barrett	Canada	565	7	2
68	Jindřiška Vaněčková	Czech Republic	564	10	5
69	Asya Karataylı	Turkey	558	8	1
70	Virginie Chénier	Canada	557	7	5
71	Nanna Jakobsen	Denmark	555	6	3
72	Beauty Ray	Bangladesh	551	6	1
73	Teja Slana	Slovenia	526	7	2
74	Klára Grapová	Czech Republic	521	6	2
75	Cinthya Pellecer	Guatemala	515	7	2
76	Nancy Enriquez	Guatemala	508	7	1
77	Sarah Saloum	Saudi Arabia	435	3	1
78	Mashail Alotaibi	Saudi Arabia	415	5	2
79	Shaden Al Marshud	Saudi Arabia	394	3	0
	Diya Siddique	Bangladesh	DNS		

== Elimination round ==
=== Section 1 ===
1/48 finals
1	(South Korea) An San
Bye
33	(Belarus) Karyna Dziominskaya
Bye
Bye
32	(Turkey) Büşranur Coşkun
17	(Italy) Lucilla Boari
Bye
65	(Mongolia) Ankhbayaryn Otgonjargal	4	23	26	22	26	28
48	(Italy) Chiara Rebagliati	6	21	27	28	25	29
49	(United Kingdom) Penny Healey	6	29	26	29
64	(Austria) Elisabeth Straka	0	26	23	24
Bye
16	(Czech Republic) Marie Horáčková

1/24 finals
1	(South Korea) An San
Bye
33	(Belarus) Karyna Dziominskaya	2	26	27	29	27
32	(Turkey) Büşranur Coşkun	6	28	28	28	29
17	(Italy) Lucilla Boari	5^{6}	25	27	28	28	27
48	(Italy) Chiara Rebagliati	6^{9}	26	27	27	28	27
49	(United Kingdom) Penny Healey	3	25	29	28	24	23
16	(Czech Republic) Marie Horáčková	7	26	29	27	26	27

1/16 finals
1	(South Korea) An San	6	29	28	28	27
32	(Turkey) Büşranur Coşkun	2	29	27	27	27
48	(Italy) Chiara Rebagliati	6	28	26	28
16	(Czech Republic) Marie Horáčková	0	27	25	27

1/8 finals
1	(South Korea) An San	6	29	29	28
48	(Italy) Chiara Rebagliati	0	27	28	26

=== Section 2 ===
1/48 finals
9	(Germany) Katharina Bauer
Bye
57	(Estonia) Triinu Lilienthal	7	23	26	26	28	29
56	(Slovenia) A Umer	3	24	26	25	25	28
41	(Slovakia) Denisa Baránková	6	22	25	27	25	28
72	(Bangladesh) Beauty Ray	4	25	26	19	24	25
Bye
24	(Turkey) Yasemin Anagöz
25	(Chinese Taipei) Lu Dai-ling
Bye
73	(Slovenia) Teja Slana	6	25	25	26	25	28
40	(Poland) Natalia Leśniak	4	28	22	25	28	24
Bye
8	(Mexico) Aída Román

1/24 finals
9	(Germany) Katharina Bauer	6	27	28	28
57	(Estonia) Triinu Lilienthal	0	22	25	23
41	(Slovakia) Denisa Baránková	0	25	27	25
24	(Turkey) Yasemin Anagöz	6	30	29	27
25	(Chinese Taipei) Lu Dai-ling	3	27	25	27	25	24
73	(Slovenia) Teja Slana	7	27	25	27	28	26
Bye
8	(Mexico) Aída Román

1/16 finals
9	(Germany) Katharina Bauer	3	29	29	29	27	27
24	(Turkey) Yasemin Anagöz	7	28	30	29	28	29
73	(Slovenia) Teja Slana	4	27	26	28	24	26
8	(Mexico) Aída Román	6	26	25	29	28	28

1/8 finals
24	(Turkey) Yasemin Anagöz	6	25	28	28	28	29
8	(Mexico) Aída Román	4	27	28	27	26	29

=== Section 3 ===
1/48 finals
5	(United States) Casey Kaufhold
Bye
37	(Chinese Taipei) Lin Chia-en	7	26	27	29	29
76	(Guatemala) Nancy Enriquez	1	26	26	22	19
Bye
28	(Ukraine) Veronika Marchenko
21	(Denmark) Randi Degn
Bye
69	(Turkey) Asya Karataylı	2	24	22	27	22
44	(United States) Jennifer Mucino-Fernandez	6	26	24	26	27
53	(Romania) Mădălina Amăistroaie	6	26	26	27	28
60	(Portugal) Milana Tkachenko	2	23	25	27	28
Bye
12	(France) Mélodie Richard

1/24 finals
5	(United States) Casey Kaufhold
Bye
37	(Chinese Taipei) Lin Chia-en	4	28	26	27	26	27
28	(Ukraine) Veronika Marchenko	6	26	29	23	27	28
21	(Denmark) Randi Degn	0	26	27	24
44	(United States) Jennifer Mucino-Fernandez	6	27	28	28
53	(Romania) Mădălina Amăistroaie	7	27	28	27	26	28
12	(France) Mélodie Richard	3	28	27	27	25	27

1/16 finals
5	(United States) Casey Kaufhold	6	29	27	26	27
28	(Ukraine) Veronika Marchenko	2	28	24	28	23
44	(United States) Jennifer Mucino-Fernandez	2	28	23	25	26
53	(Romania) Mădălina Amăistroaie	6	24	27	26	29

1/8 finals
5	(United States) Casey Kaufhold	6	28	29	28	27	28
53	(Romania) Mădălina Amăistroaie	4	30	27	26	29	20

=== Section 4 ===
1/48 finals
13	(Moldova) Alexandra Mirca
Bye
61	(Slovenia) Špela Ferš	2	26	24	27	24
52	(Slovakia) Alexandra Longová	6	29	27	25	27
45	(Brazil) Ana Machado	4	26	26	27	27	28
68	(Czech Republic) Jindřiška Vaněčková	6	27	23	29	27	28
Bye
20	(India) Ankita Bhakat
29	(India) Komalika Bari
Bye
77	(Saudi Arabia) Sarah Saloum	0	19	18	17
36	(Germany) Elisa Tartler	6	27	26	26
Bye
4	(South Korea) Kang Chae-young

1/24 finals
13	(Moldova) Alexandra Mirca	6	27	25	26	29	27
52	(Slovakia) Alexandra Longová	4	27	28	25	26	27
68	(Czech Republic) Jindřiška Vaněčková	3	25	27	29	28	27
20	(India) Ankita Bhakat	7	25	28	28	29	29
29	(India) Komalika Bari	6^{9}	27	30	27	26	28
36	(Germany) Elisa Tartler	5^{8}	27	27	28	27	21
Bye
4	(South Korea) Kang Chae-young

1/16 finals
13	(Moldova) Alexandra Mirca	1	25	25	26	26
20	(India) Ankita Bhakat	7	29	26	26	27
29	(India) Komalika Bari	2	22	23	27	28
4	(South Korea) Kang Chae-young	6	26	29	25	29

1/8 finals
20	(India) Ankita Bhakat	6	29	28	27	24	29
4	(South Korea) Kang Chae-young	4	28	28	27	29	28

=== Section 5 ===
1/48 finals
3	(South Korea) Jang Min-hee
Bye
35	(Brazil) Ane Marcelle dos Santos	6	26	27	28
78	(Saudi Arabia) Mashail Alotaibi	0	25	21	18
Bye
30	(Ukraine) Lidiia Sichenikova
19	Inna Stepanova
Bye
67	(Canada) Stephanie Barrett	6	28	28	27	26
46	(Ukraine) Polina Rodionova	2	26	24	27	26
51	(Brazil) Sarah Nikitin	6^{10}	28	24	27	29	27
62	(Spain) Inés de Velasco	5^{8}	27	28	27	26	28
Bye
14	(United Kingdom) Bryony Pitman

1/24 finals
3	(South Korea) Jang Min-hee
Bye
35	(Brazil) Ane Marcelle dos Santos	2	25	26	29	27
30	(Ukraine) Lidiia Sichenikova	6	27	26	29	28
19	Inna Stepanova	3	28	25	26	25	26
67	(Canada) Stephanie Barrett	7	26	26	26	27	27
51	(Brazil) Sarah Nikitin	2	24	26	28	24
14	(United Kingdom) Bryony Pitman	6	28	26	28	26

1/16 finals
3	(South Korea) Jang Min-hee	6^{9+}	27	27	30	27	27
30	(Ukraine) Lidiia Sichenikova	5^{9}	26	27	26	29	29
67	(Canada) Stephanie Barrett	0	20	19	24
14	(United Kingdom) Bryony Pitman	6	27	29	26

1/8 finals
3	(South Korea) Jang Min-hee	6	28	27	27	27	28
14	(United Kingdom) Bryony Pitman	4	28	26	23	28	28

=== Section 6 ===
1/48 finals
11	(Netherlands) Laura van der Winkel
Bye
59	(Belarus) Hanna Marusava	0	25	27	26
54	(Italy) Vanessa Landi	6	29	29	27
43	(Belarus) Karyna Kazlouskaya	7	27	26	28	25	29
70	(Canada) Virginie Chénier	3	27	24	22	28	27
Bye
22	(Japan) Miki Nakamura
27	(United Kingdom) Yulia Larkins
Bye
75	(Guatemala) Cinthya Pellecer	2	24	23	28	25
38	(Colombia) Ana Rendón	6	27	29	26	29
Bye
6	(France) Lisa Barbelin

1/24 finals
11	(Netherlands) Laura van der Winkel	5^{7}	26	25	28	26	26
54	(Italy) Vanessa Landi	6^{8}	27	24	24	26	28
43	(Belarus) Karyna Kazlouskaya	1	24	28	27	27
22	(Japan) Miki Nakamura	7	29	28	29	28
27	(United Kingdom) Yulia Larkins	6	28	26	26	26	26
38	(Colombia) Ana Rendón	4	25	24	28	27	24
Bye
6	(France) Lisa Barbelin

1/16 finals
54	(Italy) Vanessa Landi	1	27	28	26	28
22	(Japan) Miki Nakamura	7	27	29	30	29
27	(United Kingdom) Yulia Larkins	0	22	26	27
6	(France) Lisa Barbelin	6	28	30	29

1/8 finals
22	(Japan) Miki Nakamura	4	27	29	25	30	28
6	(France) Lisa Barbelin	6	29	26	27	28	29

=== Section 7 ===
1/48 finals
7	Elena Osipova
Bye
39	(Japan) Tomomi Sugimoto	6	29	23	30
74	(Czech Republic) Klára Grapová	0	26	21	22
Bye
26	(India) Ridhi
23	Svetlana Gomboeva
Bye
71	(Denmark) Nanna Jakobsen	6^{9}	28	24	27	28	26
42	(Poland) Sylwia Zyzańska	5^{8}	25	29	28	25	26
55	(Poland) Wioleta Myszor	1	25	25	26	25
58	(Spain) Leyre Fernández Infante	7	26	28	26	26
Bye
10	(Spain) Elia Canales

1/24 finals
7	Elena Osipova
Bye
39	(Japan) Tomomi Sugimoto	6	29	26	28	28	28
26	(India) Ridhi	4	29	27	27	28	25
23	Svetlana Gomboeva	6	27	28	29	28
71	(Denmark) Nanna Jakobsen	2	27	24	27	28
58	(Spain) Leyre Fernández Infante	6	27	28	26
10	(Spain) Elia Canales	0	26	18	25

1/16 finals
7	Elena Osipova	2	26	26	29	29
39	(Japan) Tomomi Sugimoto	6	27	28	26	30
23	Svetlana Gomboeva	7	27	27	26	27	28
58	(Spain) Leyre Fernández Infante	3	29	26	26	26	27

1/8 finals
39	(Japan) Tomomi Sugimoto	4	29	27	27	27	26
23	Svetlana Gomboeva	6	28	27	28	27	27

=== Section 8 ===
1/48 finals
15	(Netherlands) Gabriela Schloesser
Bye
63	(Kyrgyzstan) Asel Sharbekova	2	24	25	24	24
50	(Japan) Mao Watanabe	6	23	26	26	27
47	(France) Caroline Lopez	7	27	27	28	25
66	(Canada) Tania Edwards	1	25	27	20	23
Bye
18	(Germany) Michelle Kroppen
31	(United States) Gabrielle Sasai
Bye
79	(Saudi Arabia) Shaden Al Marshud	0	16	26	22
34	(Mexico) Ana Paula Vázquez	6	28	27	23
Bye
2	(Mexico) Alejandra Valencia

1/24 finals
15	(Netherlands) Gabriela Schloesser	7	26	28	27	27	26
50	(Japan) Mao Watanabe	3	27	26	27	25	25
47	(France) Caroline Lopez	0	26	25	26
18	(Germany) Michelle Kroppen	6	29	27	28
31	(United States) Gabrielle Sasai	0	26	23	22
34	(Mexico) Ana Paula Vázquez	6	29	29	28
Bye
2	(Mexico) Alejandra Valencia

1/16 finals
15	(Netherlands) Gabriela Schloesser	6^{9+}	26	30	26	24	28
18	(Germany) Michelle Kroppen	5^{9}	26	26	29	25	27
34	(Mexico) Ana Paula Vázquez	5^{9}	27	27	27	27	27
2	(Mexico) Alejandra Valencia	6^{10}	26	28	28	22	27

1/8 finals
15	(Netherlands) Gabriela Schloesser	0	27	27	27
2	(Mexico) Alejandra Valencia	6	29	29	29

== Final round ==
Quarterfinals
1	(South Korea) An San	6	29	29	28
24	(Turkey) Yasemin Anagöz	0	28	26	27
5	(United States) Casey Kaufhold	6	30	29	27	30
20	(India) Ankita Bhakat	2	27	24	30	27
3	(South Korea) Jang Min-hee	6^{X}	29	27	26	26	26
6	(France) Lisa Barbelin	5^{10}	26	28	26	26	26
23	Svetlana Gomboeva	3	25	29	27	26	27
2	(Mexico) Alejandra Valencia	7	27	28	27	27	28

Semifinals
1	(South Korea) An San	2	28	28	28	24
5	(United States) Casey Kaufhold	6	29	29	27	28
3	(South Korea) Jang Min-hee	6	29	27	29	29	28
2	(Mexico) Alejandra Valencia	4	29	27	29	28	28

Finals
5	(United States) Casey Kaufhold	0	27	27	26
3	(South Korea) Jang Min-hee	6	29	28	29
Third place
1	(South Korea) An San	6	26	29	30	28	30
2	(Mexico) Alejandra Valencia	4	28	29	29	28	29
