= 2021 World Archery Championships – Women's team recurve =

Archery competition

2021 World Archery Championships
Men	Recurve	Compound
Women	Recurve	Compound
Team	Men's recurve	Men's compound
Team	Women's recurve	Women's compound
Mixed team	Recurve	Compound

The women's team recurve competition at the 2021 World Archery Championships took place from 21 to 24 September in Yankton, United States.

== Schedule ==
All times are Central Daylight Time (UTC−05:00).

Date	Time	Round
Tuesday, 21 September	09:00	Qualification round
Wednesday, 22 September	14:00; 14:45; 15:15; 15:45	1/12 finals 1/8 finals Quarterfinals; Semifinals
Friday, 24 September	10:02; 10:28	Bronze medal match Final

== Qualification round ==
Results after 216 arrows.

Rank	Nation	Name	Score	10+X	X
1	South Korea	An San; Jang Min-hee; Kang Chae-young	1928	62	17
2	Mexico	Aída Román; Alejandra Valencia; Ana Vázquez	1887	60	13
3	Russian Archery Federation	Svetlana Gomboeva; Elena Osipova; Inna Stepanova	1880	46	15
4	France	Lisa Barbelin; Caroline Lopez; Mélodie Richard	1864	29	17
5	Germany	Katharina Bauer; Michelle Kroppen; Elisa Tartler	1864	50	14
6	United States	Casey Kaufhold; Jennifer Mucino-Fernandez; Gabrielle Sasai	1855	47	11
7	India	Komalika Bari; Ankita Bhakat; Ridhi	1854	44	15
8	United Kingdom	Penny Healey; Yulia Larkins; Bryony Pitman	1837	51	14
9	Ukraine	Veronika Marchenko; Polina Rodionova; Lidiia Sichenikova	1827	40	14
10	Japan	Miki Nakamura; Tomomi Sugimoto; Mao Watanabe	1823	50	12
11	Italy	Lucilla Boari; Vanessa Landi; Chiara Rebagliati	1817	43	12
12	Belarus	Karyna Dziominskaya; Karyna Kazlouskaya; Hanna Marusava	1805	38	12
13	Poland	Natalia Leśniak; Wioleta Myszor; Sylwia Zyzańska	1805	37	10
14	Brazil	Ane Marcelle dos Santos; Ana Machado; Sarah Nikitin	1805	34	12
15	Spain	Elia Canales; Inés de Velasco; Leyre Fernández Infante	1804	36	12
16	Turkey	Yasemin Anagöz; Büşranur Coşkun; Asya Karataylı	1787	35	17
17	Czech Republic	Klára Grapová; Marie Horáčková; Jindřiška Vaněčková	1710	31	11
18	Slovenia	Špela Ferš; Teja Slana; Ana Umer	1700	29	6
19	Canada	Stephanie Barrett; Virginie Chénier; Tania Edwards	1687	24	10
20	Saudi Arabia	Shaden Al Marshud; Mashail Alotaibi; Sarah Saloum	1244	11	3

== Elimination round ==
=== Section 1 ===
1/12 finals
1	South Korea
Bye
17	Czech Republic	6	55	52	49
16	Turkey	0	51	49	48
9	Ukraine
Bye
Bye
8	United Kingdom
5	Germany
Bye
Bye
12	Belarus
13	Poland	6	50	54	55
20	Saudi Arabia	0	25	28	37
Bye
4	France

1/8 finals
1	South Korea	6	56	57	57
17	Czech Republic	0	52	50	50
9	Ukraine	0	53	51	53
8	United Kingdom	6	56	55	56
5	Germany	5	55	56	55
12	Belarus	1	52	53	55
13	Poland	2	54	53	50	41
4	France	6	57	51	54	56

Quarterfinals
1	South Korea	5	52	54	54
8	United Kingdom	1	52	48	50
5	Germany	2	51	50	45	50
4	France	6	50	56	51	51

Semifinals
1	South Korea	5	53	51	54	55	28+
4	France	4	57	54	53	53	28

=== Section 2 ===
1/12 finals
3	RAF
Bye
19	Canada	4	49	53	56	52	20
14	Brazil	5	52	55	54	50	23
11	Italy
Bye
Bye
6	United States
7	India
Bye
Bye
10	Japan
15	Spain	3	49	52	52	46
18	Slovenia	5	53	52	51	47
Bye
2	Mexico

1/8 finals
3	RAF	4	55	53	55	51	22
14	Brazil	5	53	57	54	55	27
11	Italy	6	53	56	55	54
6	United States	2	55	52	53	53
7	India	5	54	55	57
10	Japan	1	53	55	54
18	Slovenia	0	53	54	56
2	Mexico	6	54	56	58

Quarterfinals
14	Brazil	5	58	52	51	55
11	Italy	3	48	57	51	52
7	India	2	54	54	54	51
2	Mexico	6	53	55	55	54

Semifinals
14	Brazil	0	51	49	51
2	Mexico	6	53	57	55

== Final round ==
Semifinals
1	South Korea	5	53	51	54	55	28+
4	France	4	57	54	53	53	28
14	Brazil	0	51	49	51
2	Mexico	6	53	57	55

Finals
1	South Korea	5	53	55	55	56
2	Mexico	3	54	54	53	56
Third place
4	France	6	51	55	55	54
14	Brazil	2	58	49	54	52
