= 2021 World Archery Championships – Recurve mixed team =

Archery competition

2021 World Archery Championships
Men	Recurve	Compound
Women	Recurve	Compound
Team	Men's recurve	Men's compound
Team	Women's recurve	Women's compound
Mixed team	Recurve	Compound

The mixed team recurve competition at the 2021 World Archery Championships took place from 21 to 24 September in Yankton, United States.

== Schedule ==
All times are Central Daylight Time (UTC−05:00).

Date	Time	Round
Tuesday, 21 September	09:00; 17:45	Qualification round 1/12 finals
Wednesday, 22 September	16:45; 17:10; 17:35	1/8 finals Quarterfinals; Semifinals
Friday, 24 September	12:10; 12:29	Bronze medal match Final

== Qualification round ==
Results after 144 arrows.

Rank	Nation	Name	Score	10+X	X
1	South Korea	An San; Kim Woo-jin	1323	60	25
2	United States	Casey Kaufhold; Brady Ellison	1298	53	19
3	France	Lisa Barbelin; Thomas Chirault	1291	45	18
4	Spain	Elia Canales; Miguel Alvariño Garcia	1288	42	11
5	Mexico	Alejandra Valencia; Luis Álvarez	1283	40	7
6	Russian Archery Federation	Elena Osipova; Galsan Bazarzhapov	1280	39	14
7	Brazil	Ane Marcelle dos Santos; Marcus D'Almeida	1278	46	16
8	Netherlands	Laura van der Winkel; Steve Wijler	1276	32	9
9	Italy	Lucilla Boari; Mauro Nespoli	1275	42	11
10	Chinese Taipei	Lu Dai-ling; Wei Chun-heng	1273	45	15
11	United Kingdom	Bryony Pitman; Patrick Huston	1273	44	10
12	Germany	Katharina Bauer; Florian Unruh	1272	43	19
13	Japan	Miki Nakamura; Takaharu Furukawa	1268	44	9
14	Moldova	Alexandra Mirca; Dan Olaru	1265	39	12
15	Turkey	Yasemin Anagöz; Mete Gazoz	1260	29	14
16	India	Ankita Bhakat; Parth Salunkhe	1259	39	12
17	Ukraine	Veronika Marchenko; Ivan Kozhokar	1257	35	6
18	Czech Republic	Marie Horáčková; Michal Hlahůlek	1252	38	11
19	Colombia	Ana Rendón; Jorge Enríquez	1245	24	3
20	Belarus	Karyna Dziominskaya; Anton Tsiareta	1240	28	9
21	Slovakia	Denisa Baránková; Juraj Duchoň	1238	28	9
22	Slovenia	Ana Umer; Žiga Ravnikar	1235	39	11
23	Poland	Natalia Leśniak; Kacper Sierakowski	1234	28	9
24	Mongolia	Otgonjargal Ankhbayar; Dashnamjil Dorjsuren	1223	29	12
25	Austria	Elisabeth Straka; Andreas Gstöttner	1217	28	11
26	Portugal	Milana Tkachenko; Nuno Carneiro	1213	30	14
27	Denmark	Randi Degn; Ludvig Njor Henriksen	1197	28	11
28	Bangladesh	Beauty Ray; Ram Krishna Saha	1193	28	4
29	Canada	Tania Edwards; Andrew Azores	1192	24	5
30	Estonia	Triinu Lilienthal; Karl Kivilo	1163	23	5
31	Guatemala	Cinthya Pellecer; Thomas Flossbach	1128	20	3
32	Saudi Arabia	Sarah Saloum; Mansour Alwi	1022	14	2

== Elimination round ==
=== Section 1 ===
1/12 finals
1	South Korea
Bye
17	Ukraine	0	31	35	35
16	India	6	38	38	36
9	Italy	3	33	32	40	34
24	Mongolia	5	35	35	33	34
Bye
8	Netherlands
5	Mexico
Bye
21	Slovakia	0	33	31	35
12	Germany	6	38	38	38
13	Japan	5	35	37	35	35
20	Belarus	3	34	37	36	33
Bye
4	Spain

1/8 finals
1	South Korea	5	39	38	39
16	India	1	36	35	39
24	Mongolia	5	38	37	37
8	Netherlands	1	38	32	36
5	Mexico	2	34	38	35	36
12	Germany	6	36	38	35	38
20	Japan	5	38	36	39	37
4	Spain	3	39	36	37	31

Quarterfinals
1	South Korea	5	35	37	37	36
24	Mongolia	3	36	37	34	30
12	Germany	4	37	36	38	35	18
20	Japan	5	38	35	36	36	18

Semifinals
1	South Korea	5	37	38	39
20	Japan	1	37	36	37

=== Section 2 ===
1/12 finals
3	France
Bye
19	Colombia	2	31	36	35	35
14	Moldova	6	36	36	35	37
11	United Kingdom	2	29	38	33	32
22	Slovenia	6	34	34	34	35
Bye
6	RAF
7	Brazil
Bye
23	Poland	1	31	34	35
10	Chinese Taipei	5	33	37	35
15	Turkey	6	37	36	36	37
18	Czech Republic	2	34	35	37	36
Bye
2	United States

1/8 finals
3	France	5	37	34	36	33	18
14	Moldova	4	36	36	35	35	16
22	Slovenia	4	37	39	29	34	16
6	RAF	5	34	37	34	37	18
7	Brazil	4	37	38	36	36	16
10	Chinese Taipei	5	38	37	35	39	18
15	Turkey	5	35	38	39	36	18+
2	United States	4	39	37	37	38	18

Quarterfinals
3	France	1	38	35	39
6	RAF	5	38	37	40
10	Chinese Taipei	4	35	37	38	38	18
15	Turkey	5	38	33	37	39	19

Semifinals
6	RAF	6	36	38	36	37
15	Turkey	2	32	36	39	34

== Final round ==
Semifinals
1	South Korea	5	37	38	39
20	Japan	1	37	36	37
5	RAF	6	36	38	36	37
15	Turkey	2	32	36	39	34

Finals
1	South Korea	6	38	39	37
6	RAF	0	36	36	33
Third place
20	Japan	2	38	36	33	36
15	Turkey	6	36	38	37	37
