= 2021 World Archery Championships – Men's individual compound =

Archery competition

2021 World Archery Championships
Men	Recurve	Compound
Women	Recurve	Compound
Team	Men's recurve	Men's compound
Team	Women's recurve	Women's compound
Mixed team	Recurve	Compound

The men's individual compound competition at the 2021 World Archery Championships took place from 21 to 25 September in Yankton, United States.

== Schedule ==
All times are Central Daylight Time (UTC−05:00).

Date	Time	Round
Tuesday, 21 September	09:00	Qualification round
Thursday, 23 September	09:15; 10:15; 11:00; 11:40	1/48 finals 1/24 finals 1/16 finals 1/8 finals
Saturday, 25 September	14:02; 14:50; 15:19; 15:31	Quarterfinals; Semifinals; Bronze medal match Final

== Qualification round ==
Results after 72 arrows.

Rank	Name	Nation	Score	10+X	X
1	Evren Çağıran	Turkey	705	58	27
2	Mike Schloesser	Netherlands	700	55	20
3	Christopher Perkins	Canada	699	52	29
4	Tim Krippendorf	Germany	699	52	15
5	James Lutz	United States	698	52	16
6	Kim Jong-ho	South Korea	697	51	19
7	Abhishek Verma	India	695	48	28
8	Łukasz Przybylski	Poland	694	49	18
9	Mathias Fullerton	Denmark	694	51	13
10	Jozef Bošanský	Slovakia	694	48	20
11	Robin Jäätma	Estonia	694	47	22
12	Stephan Hansen	Denmark	693	47	17
13	Nico Wiener	Austria	693	46	13
14	Yakup Yıldız	Turkey	692	49	25
15	Yang Jae-won	South Korea	692	49	20
16	Sebastian Hamdorf	Germany	692	47	16
17	Braden Gellenthien	United States	692	46	14
18	Adrien Gontier	France	691	48	21
19	Mario Vavro	Croatia	690	47	15
20	Jean Pizarro	Puerto Rico	690	45	18
21	Daniel Muñoz	Colombia	689	49	17
22	Florian Grafmans	Germany	689	47	18
23	Sebastián Arenas	Colombia	689	46	15
24	Anders Faugstad	Norway	688	45	18
25	Adam Carpenter	United Kingdom	688	45	16
26	Sangampreet Singh Bisla	India	688	44	16
27	Anton Bulaev	Russian Archery Federation	687	49	24
28	Miguel Becerra	Mexico	687	47	15
29	James Mason	United Kingdom	687	45	14
30	Julio Barillas	Guatemala	687	43	16
31	Viktor Kalashnikov	Russian Archery Federation	687	43	15
32	Adam Ravenscroft	United Kingdom	687	42	24
33	Jean Philippe Boulch	France	686	41	21
34	Andrew Fagan	Canada	685	43	20
35	Roberto Hernández	El Salvador	685	43	17
36	Elia Fregnan	Italy	685	43	15
37	Pierre-Julien Deloche	France	685	43	15
38	Choi Yong-hee	South Korea	685	40	16
39	Furkan Oruç	Turkey	684	45	17
40	Shamai Yamrom	Israel	684	42	28
41	Domagoj Buden	Croatia	684	42	14
42	Federico Pagnoni	Italy	683	43	14
43	Alexander Dambaev	Russian Archery Federation	683	39	16
44	Antonio Hidalgo	Mexico	683	38	21
45	Juan Bonilla	Colombia	681	38	16
46	Stefan Heincz	Austria	681	38	12
47	Nuno Simões	Portugal	681	37	11
48	Sergio Pagni	Italy	681	36	16
49	Rishabh Yadav	India	680	42	18
50	Martin Damsbo	Denmark	679	40	14
51	Aljaž Matija Brenk	Slovenia	678	37	13
52	Max Verwoerdt	Netherlands	678	37	9
53	Sil Pater	Netherlands	676	37	12
54	Uriel Olvera	Mexico	676	36	18
55	Ramón López	Spain	676	34	9
56	Akbarali Karabayev	Kazakhstan	675	33	8
57	Michael Matzner	Austria	674	41	12
58	Ashim Kumer Das	Bangladesh	674	36	14
59	Staš Modic	Slovenia	673	36	13
60	José Marcelo del Cid	Guatemala	673	31	10
61	Serhiy Atamanenko	Ukraine	672	35	12
62	Joannes Poulsen	Faroe Islands	672	34	11
63	Tim Jevšnik	Slovenia	671	36	14
64	Kazune Nakamura	Japan	671	32	12
65	Arnaud Hocevar	Luxembourg	670	30	11
66	Kris Schaff	United States	669	33	18
67	Peng Te-yang	Chinese Taipei	666	33	11
68	Miguel Ángel Medina Orta	Spain	666	26	5
69	Jamie Brehaut	Canada	663	28	8
70	Jesús Jacinto Pérez González	Spain	662	30	14
71	Bryan Alvarado	Puerto Rico	660	28	12
72	Liu Yuan	Chinese Taipei	659	30	7
73	Cláudio Alves	Portugal	658	28	10
74	Carlos Resende	Portugal	654	34	13
75	Pedro Salazar	Guatemala	654	26	13
76	Edgar Francisco Barsallo Moreno	Panama	653	26	10
77	Zhomart Bektursun	Kazakhstan	650	24	8
78	Kaj Johannesen	Faroe Islands	650	22	10
79	Otgonbayar Lkhamjav	Mongolia	642	27	12
80	Nikkel Petersen	Faroe Islands	641	19	6
81	Gan-Erdene Gombodorj	Mongolia	635	17	7
82	Ali Alshamrani	Saudi Arabia	633	17	9
83	Ganzorig Ganbaatar	Mongolia	628	16	4
84	Bunyod Mirzametov	Kazakhstan	628	15	5
85	Alfreð Birgisson	Iceland	626	14	4
86	Chen Hong-yi	Chinese Taipei	599	14	1
87	Majdi Alsubhi	Saudi Arabia	592	9	2
88	Haitham Mobark	Saudi Arabia	426	2	0

== Elimination round ==
=== Section 1 ===
1/48 finals
1	(Turkey) Evren Çağıran
Bye
33	(France) Jean Philippe Boulch	149
80	(Faroe Islands) Nikkel Petersen	142
81	(Mongolia) Gan-Erdene Gombodorj	143
32	(United Kingdom) Adam Ravenscroft	146
17	(United Kingdom) Braden Gellenthien
Bye
65	(Luxembourg) Arnaud Hocevar	141
48	(Italy) Sergio Pagni	144
49	(India) Rishabh Yadav	147
64	(Japan) Kazune Nakamura	143
Bye
16	(Germany) Sebastian Hamdorf
9	(Denmark) Mathias Fullerton
Bye
57	(Austria) Michael Matzner	144
56	(Kazakhstan) Akbarali Karabayev	148
41	(Croatia) Domagoj Buden	148
72	(Chinese Taipei) Liu Yuan	144
Bye
24	(Norway) Anders Faugstad
25	(United Kingdom) Adam Carpenter	149
88	(Saudi Arabia) Haitham Mobark	116
73	(Portugal) Cláudio Alves	142
40	(Israel) Shamai Yamrom	145
Bye
8	(Poland) Łukasz Przybylski

1/24 finals
1	(Turkey) Evren Çağıran
Bye
33	(France) Jean Philippe Boulch	149
32	(United Kingdom) Adam Ravenscroft	144
17	(United Kingdom) Braden Gellenthien	149
48	(Italy) Sergio Pagni	144
49	(India) Rishabh Yadav	143
16	(Germany) Sebastian Hamdorf	146
9	(Denmark) Mathias Fullerton	145
56	(Kazakhstan) Akbarali Karabayev	144
41	(Croatia) Domagoj Buden	147^{X}
24	(Norway) Anders Faugstad	147^{9}
25	(United Kingdom) Adam Carpenter	146
40	(Israel) Shamai Yamrom	149
Bye
8	(Poland) Łukasz Przybylski

1/16 finals
1	(Turkey) Evren Çağıran	147^{10}
33	(France) Jean Philippe Boulch	147^{10+}
17	(United Kingdom) Braden Gellenthien	145
16	(Germany) Sebastian Hamdorf	148
9	(Denmark) Mathias Fullerton	144^{X}
41	(Croatia) Domagoj Buden	144^{9}
40	(Israel) Shamai Yamrom	143
8	(Poland) Łukasz Przybylski	142

1/8 finals
33	(France) Jean Philippe Boulch	145
16	(Germany) Sebastian Hamdorf	142
9	(Denmark) Mathias Fullerton	147
40	(Israel) Shamai Yamrom	145

Quarterfinals
33	(France) Jean Philippe Boulch	144
9	(Denmark) Mathias Fullerton	145

=== Section 2 ===
1/48 finals
5	(United States) James Lutz
Bye
37	(France) Pierre-Julien Deloche	148
76	(Panama) Edgar Francisco Barsallo Moreno	136
85	(Iceland) Alfreð Birgisson	139
28	(Mexico) Miguel Becerra	150
21	(Colombia) Daniel Muñoz
Bye
69	(Canada) Jamie Brehaut	141
44	(Mexico) Antonio Hidalgo	150
53	(Netherlands) Sil Pater	144
60	(Guatemala) José Marcelo del Cid	143
Bye
12	(Denmark) Stephan Hansen
13	(Austria) Nico Wiener
Bye
61	(Ukraine) Serhiy Atamanenko	144
52	(Netherlands) Max Verwoerdt	146
45	(Colombia) Juan Bonilla	143
68	(Spain) Miguel Ángel Medina Orta	148
Bye
20	(Puerto Rico) Jean Pizarro
29	(United Kingdom) James Mason	145
84	(Kazakhstan) Bunyod Mirzametov	143
77	(Kazakhstan) Zhomart Bektursun	143
36	(Italy) Elia Fregnan	149
Bye
4	(Germany) Tim Krippendorf

1/24 finals
5	(United States) James Lutz
Bye
37	(France) Pierre-Julien Deloche	147
28	(Mexico) Miguel Becerra	148
21	(Colombia) Daniel Muñoz	147
44	(Mexico) Antonio Hidalgo	148
53	(Netherlands) Sil Pater	145
12	(Denmark) Stephan Hansen	148
13	(Austria) Nico Wiener	147
52	(Netherlands) Max Verwoerdt	144
68	(Spain) Miguel Ángel Medina Orta	142
20	(Puerto Rico) Jean Pizarro	146
29	(United Kingdom) James Mason	147
36	(Italy) Elia Fregnan	149
Bye
4	(Germany) Tim Krippendorf

1/16 finals
5	(United States) James Lutz	144
28	(Mexico) Miguel Becerra	147
44	(Mexico) Antonio Hidalgo	145^{9}
12	(Denmark) Stephan Hansen	145^{X}
13	(Austria) Nico Wiener	148
20	(Puerto Rico) Jean Pizarro	145
36	(Italy) Elia Fregnan	147
4	(Germany) Tim Krippendorf	149

1/8 finals
28	(Mexico) Miguel Becerra	147
12	(Denmark) Stephan Hansen	146
13	(Austria) Nico Wiener	145
4	(Germany) Tim Krippendorf	143

Quarterfinals
28	(Mexico) Miguel Becerra	142
13	(Austria) Nico Wiener	148

=== Section 3 ===
1/48 finals
3	(Canada) Christopher Perkins
Bye
35	(El Salvador) Roberto Hernández	148
75	(Faroe Islands) Kaj Johannesen	145
83	(Mongolia) Ganzorig Ganbaatar	130
30	(Guatemala) Julio Barillas	148
19	(Croatia) Mario Vavro
Bye
67	(Chinese Taipei) Peng Te-yang	147
46	(Austria) Stefan Heincz	149
51	(Slovenia) Aljaž Matija Brenk	144
62	(Faroe Islands) Joannes Poulsen	143
Bye
14	(Turkey) Yakup Yıldız
11	(Estonia) Robin Jäätma
Bye
59	(Slovenia) Staš Modic	148
54	(Mexico) Uriel Olvera	144
43	Alexander Dambaev	140
70	(Spain) Jesús Jacinto Pérez González	142
Bye
22	(Germany) Florian Grafmans
27	Anton Bulaev	145
86	(Chinese Taipei) Chen Hong-yi	142
75	(Guatemala) Pedro Salazar	143
38	(South Korea) Choi Yong-hee	149
Bye
6	(South Korea) Kim Jong-ho

1/24 finals
3	(Canada) Christopher Perkins
Bye
35	(El Salvador) Roberto Hernández	143
30	(Guatemala) Julio Barillas	145
19	(Croatia) Mario Vavro	147
46	(Austria) Stefan Heincz	146
51	(Slovenia) Aljaž Matija Brenk	145
14	(Turkey) Yakup Yıldız	144
11	(Estonia) Robin Jäätma	146
59	(Slovenia) Staš Modic	145
70	(Spain) Jesús Jacinto Pérez González	144
22	(Germany) Florian Grafmans	143
27	Anton Bulaev	142
38	(South Korea) Choi Yong-hee	148
Bye
6	(South Korea) Kim Jong-ho

1/16 finals
3	(Canada) Christopher Perkins	147
30	(Guatemala) Julio Barillas	140
19	(Croatia) Mario Vavro	147
51	(Slovenia) Aljaž Matija Brenk	141
11	(Estonia) Robin Jäätma	148
70	(Spain) Jesús Jacinto Pérez González	146
38	(South Korea) Choi Yong-hee	146
6	(South Korea) Kim Jong-ho	144

1/8 finals
3	(Canada) Christopher Perkins	147
19	(Croatia) Mario Vavro	144
11	(Estonia) Robin Jäätma	146^{10}
38	(South Korea) Choi Yong-hee	146^{9}

Quarterfinals
3	(Canada) Christopher Perkins	141
11	(Estonia) Robin Jäätma	142

=== Section 4 ===
1/48 finals
7	(India) Abhishek Verma
Bye
39	(Turkey) Furkan Oruç	146
74	(Portugal) Carlos Resende	143
87	(Saudi Arabia) Majdi Alsubhi	134
26	(India) Sangampreet Singh Bisla	148
23	(Colombia) Sebastián Arenas
Bye
71	(Puerto Rico) Bryan Alvarado	145
42	(Italy) Federico Pagnoni	144
55	(Spain) Ramón López	142
58	(Bangladesh) Ashim Kumer Das	143
Bye
10	(Slovakia) Jozef Bošanský
15	(South Korea) Yang Jae-won
Bye
63	(Slovenia) Tim Jevšnik	146^{10}
50	(Denmark) Martin Damsbo	146^{X+}
47	(Portugal) Nuno Simões	144
66	(United States) Kris Schaff	148
Bye
18	(France) Adrien Gontier
31	Viktor Kalashnikov	148
82	(Saudi Arabia) Ali Alshamrani	135
79	(Mongolia) Otgonbayar Lkhamjav	138
34	(Canada) Andrew Fagan	147
Bye
2	(Netherlands) Mike Schloesser

1/24 finals
7	(India) Abhishek Verma
Bye
39	(Turkey) Furkan Oruç	145
26	(India) Sangampreet Singh Bisla	144
23	(Colombia) Sebastián Arenas	146
71	(Puerto Rico) Bryan Alvarado	144
58	(Bangladesh) Ashim Kumer Das	145
10	(Slovakia) Jozef Bošanský	146
15	(South Korea) Yang Jae-won	150
50	(Denmark) Martin Damsbo	146
66	(United States) Kris Schaff	149
18	(France) Adrien Gontier	147
31	Viktor Kalashnikov	146
34	(Canada) Andrew Fagan	145
Bye
2	(Netherlands) Mike Schloesser

1/16 finals
7	(India) Abhishek Verma	150
39	(Turkey) Furkan Oruç	149
23	(Colombia) Sebastián Arenas	145
10	(Slovakia) Jozef Bošanský	148
15	(South Korea) Yang Jae-won	147
66	(United States) Kris Schaff	144
31	Viktor Kalashnikov	144
2	(Netherlands) Mike Schloesser	149

1/8 finals
7	(India) Abhishek Verma	145
10	(Slovakia) Jozef Bošanský	142
15	(South Korea) Yang Jae-won	147
2	(Netherlands) Mike Schloesser	150

Quarterfinals
7	(India) Abhishek Verma	147
2	(Netherlands) Mike Schloesser	148

== Final round ==
Quarterfinals
33	(France) Jean Philippe Boulch	144
9	(Denmark) Mathias Fullerton	145
28	(Mexico) Miguel Becerra	142
13	(Austria) Nico Wiener	148
3	(Canada) Christopher Perkins	141
11	(Estonia) Robin Jäätma	142
7	(India) Abhishek Verma	147
2	(Netherlands) Mike Schloesser	148

Semifinals
9	(Denmark) Mathias Fullerton	144
13	(Austria) Nico Wiener	147
11	(Estonia) Robin Jäätma	140
2	(Netherlands) Mike Schloesser	144

Finals
13	(Austria) Nico Wiener	146
2	(Netherlands) Mike Schloesser	143
Third place
9	(Denmark) Mathias Fullerton	144^{9}
11	(Estonia) Robin Jäätma	144^{X}
