= 2021 Archery World Cup =

International archery competition

- Sport: Archery
- Duration: 19 April – 30 September

World Cup Final
- Recurve Men: (gold) (United States) Jack Williams; (silver) (United States) Brady Ellison; (bronze) (Turkey) Mete Gazoz
- Recurve Women: (gold) (Germany) Lisa Unruh; (silver) (Russia) Elena Osipova; (bronze) (Germany) Michelle Kroppen
- Compound Men: (gold) (Netherlands) Mike Schloesser; (silver) (United States) Braden Gellenthien; (bronze) (United States) Kris Schaff
- Compound Women: (gold) (Colombia) Sara López; (silver) (Slovenia) Toja Ellison; (bronze) (Denmark) Tanja Gellenthien

Seasons
- ← 2019 2022 →

The 2021 Archery World Cup, also known as the Hyundai Archery World Cup for sponsorship reasons, was the 15th edition of the international archery circuit organised annually by World Archery. The 2021 World Cup consisted of four events, and ran from 19 April to 30 September 2021.

== Calendar ==
The calendar for the 2021 World Cup, announced by World Archery.

Stage	Date	Location	Ref.
1	19–25 April	Guatemala City, Guatemala	
2	17–23 May	Lausanne, Switzerland	
3	21–27 June	Paris, France	
Final	29–30 September	Yankton, United States	

== Results ==
=== Recurve ===
==== Men's individual ====
Stage	Location	1st place, gold medalist(s)	2nd place, silver medalist(s)	3rd place, bronze medalist(s)
1	Guatemala City	(India) Atanu Das	(Spain) Daniel Castro	(Mexico) Ángel Alvarado
2	(Switzerland) Lausanne	(United States) Brady Ellison	(Germany) Maximilian Weckmüller	(Spain) Yun Sanchez
3	(France) Paris	(United States) Brady Ellison	(United States) Jack Williams	(Italy) Federico Musolesi
Final	(United States) Yankton	(United States) Jack Williams	(United States) Brady Ellison	(Turkey) Mete Gazoz

==== Women's individual ====
Stage	Location	1st place, gold medalist(s)	2nd place, silver medalist(s)	3rd place, bronze medalist(s)
1	Guatemala City	(India) Deepika Kumari	(United States) Mackenzie Brown	(Mexico) Alejandra Valencia
2	(Switzerland) Lausanne	(Russia) Svetlana Gomboeva	(Russia) Ksenia Perova	(France) Audrey Adiceom
3	(France) Paris	(India) Deepika Kumari	(Russia) Elena Osipova	(United States) Mackenzie Brown
Final	(United States) Yankton	(Germany) Lisa Unruh	(Russia) Elena Osipova	(Germany) Michelle Kroppen

==== Men's team ====
Stage	Location	1st place, gold medalist(s)	2nd place, silver medalist(s)	3rd place, bronze medalist(s)
1	Guatemala City	Spain; Pablo Acha; Miguel Alvariño; Daniel Castro	United States; Brady Ellison; Matthew Requa; Josef Scarboro	Germany; Christoph Breitbach; Florian Unruh; Maximilian Weckmüller
2	(Switzerland) Lausanne	Germany; Johannes Maier; Florian Unruh; Maximilian Weckmüller	Spain; Pablo Acha; Miguel Alvariño; Daniel Castro	Italy; Federico Musolesi; Mauro Nespoli; Alessandro Paoli
3	(France) Paris	Germany; Florian Unruh; Maximilian Weckmüller; Moritz Wieser	Belgium; Ben Adriaensen; Jarno De Smedt; Senna Roos	France; Thomas Chirault; Pierre Plihon; Jean-Charles Valladont

==== Women's team ====
Stage	Location	1st place, gold medalist(s)	2nd place, silver medalist(s)	3rd place, bronze medalist(s)
1	Guatemala City	India; Komalika Bari; Ankita Bhakat; Deepika Kumari	Mexico; Aída Román; Alejandra Valencia; Ana Paula Vázquez	Germany; Michelle Kroppen; Elisa Tartler; Lisa Unruh
2	(Switzerland) Lausanne	Italy; Tatiana Andreoli; Lucilla Boari; Chiara Rebagliati	Mexico; Aída Román; Alejandra Valencia; Ana Paula Vázquez	Russia; Svetlana Gomboeva; Elena Osipova; Inna Stepanova
3	(France) Paris	India; Komalika Bari; Ankita Bhakat; Deepika Kumari	Mexico; Aída Román; Alejandra Valencia; Ana Paula Vázquez	France; Audrey Adiceom; Lisa Barbelin; Angéline Cohendet

==== Mixed team ====
Stage	Location	1st place, gold medalist(s)	2nd place, silver medalist(s)	3rd place, bronze medalist(s)
1	Guatemala City	Mexico; Ana Paula Vázquez; Ángel Alvarado	Germany; Lisa Unruh; Florian Unruh	India; Ankita Bhakat; Atanu Das
2	(Switzerland) Lausanne	Netherlands; Gabriela Schloesser; Sjef van den Berg	Bangladesh; Diya Siddique; Md Ruman Shana	Mexico; Alejandra Valencia; Luis Álvarez
3	(France) Paris	India; Deepika Kumari; Atanu Das	Netherlands; Gabriela Schloesser; Sjef van den Berg	Mexico; Alejandra Valencia; Luis Álvarez

=== Compound ===
==== Men's individual ====
Stage	Location	1st place, gold medalist(s)	2nd place, silver medalist(s)	3rd place, bronze medalist(s)
1	Guatemala City	(United States) Braden Gellenthien	(Netherlands) Mike Schloesser	(United States) Kris Schaff
2	(Switzerland) Lausanne	(Netherlands) Mike Schloesser	(Italy) Federico Pagnoni	(France) Adrien Gontier
3	(France) Paris	(India) Abhishek Verma	(United States) Kris Schaff	(Netherlands) Mike Schloesser
Final	(United States) Yankton	(Netherlands) Mike Schloesser	(United States) Braden Gellenthien	(United States) Kris Schaff

==== Women's individual ====
Stage	Location	1st place, gold medalist(s)	2nd place, silver medalist(s)	3rd place, bronze medalist(s)
1	Guatemala City	(Colombia) Nora Valdez	(Denmark) Tanja Gellenthien	(United States) Savannah Vanderwier
2	(Switzerland) Lausanne	(Denmark) Tanja Gellenthien	(Spain) Andrea Marcos	(Russia) Natalia Avdeeva
3	(France) Paris	(Colombia) Sara López	(Colombia) Alejandra Usquiano	(Slovenia) Toja Ellison
Final	(United States) Yankton	(Colombia) Sara López	(Slovenia) Toja Ellison	(Denmark) Tanja Gellenthien

==== Men's team ====
Stage	Location	1st place, gold medalist(s)	2nd place, silver medalist(s)	3rd place, bronze medalist(s)
1	Guatemala City	Mexico; Miguel Becerra; Antonio Hidalgo; Uriel Olvera	Colombia; Juan Bonilla; Pablo Gómez; Daniel Muñoz	United States; Braden Gellenthien; Kris Schaff; Reo Wilde
2	(Switzerland) Lausanne	Turkey; Evren Çağıran; Furkan Oruç; Yakup Yıldız	Netherlands; Sil Pater; Mike Schloesser; Max Verwoerdt	Italy; Marco Bruno; Sergio Pagni; Federico Pagnoni
3	(France) Paris	Denmark; Martin Damsbo; Mathias Fullerton; Stephan Hansen	United States; Braden Gellenthien; James Lutz; Kris Schaff	France; Jean-Philippe Boulch; Nicolas Girard; Adrien Gontier

==== Women's team ====
Stage	Location	1st place, gold medalist(s)	2nd place, silver medalist(s)	3rd place, bronze medalist(s)
1	Guatemala City	United States; Linda Ochoa-Anderson; Paige Pearce; Alexis Ruiz	Mexico; Andrea Becerra; Esmeralda Sánchez; Margarita Valencia	Colombia; Sara López; Alejandra Usquiano; Nora Valdez
2	(Switzerland) Lausanne	United States; Linda Ochoa-Anderson; Paige Pearce; Savannah Vanderwier	Russia; Natalia Avdeeva; Viktoria Balzhanova; Arina Cherkezova	France; Sophie Dodemont; Lola Grandjean; Tiphaine Renaudin
3	(France) Paris	Colombia; Sara López; Alejandra Usquiano; Nora Valdez	Great Britain; Layla Annison; Ella Gibson; Bayley Sargeant	Netherlands; Sanne de Laat; Martine Stas-Couwenberg; Jody Vermeulen

==== Mixed team ====
Stage	Location	1st place, gold medalist(s)	2nd place, silver medalist(s)	3rd place, bronze medalist(s)
1	Guatemala City	Denmark; Tanja Gellenthien; Stephan Hansen	Mexico; Andrea Becerra; Antonio Hidalgo	Netherlands; Jody Vermeulen; Mike Schloesser
2	(Switzerland) Lausanne	Netherlands; Jody Vermeulen; Mike Schloesser	Denmark; Tanja Gellenthien; Stephan Hansen	United States; Linda Ochoa-Anderson; Braden Gellenthien
3	(France) Paris	Russia; Elizaveta Knyazeva; Anton Bulaev	Colombia; Alejandra Usquiano; Daniel Muñoz	Italy; Paola Natale; Federico Pagnoni

== Medals table ==
Rank	Nation	Gold	Silver	Bronze	Total
1	India	7	0	1	8
2	United States	6	7	6	19
3	Netherlands	4	3	3	10
4	Colombia	4	3	1	8
5	Germany	3	2	3	8
6	Denmark	3	2	1	6
7	Mexico	2	5	4	11
8	Russia	2	4	2	8
9	Spain	1	3	1	5
10	Italy	1	1	4	6
11	Turkey	1	0	1	2
12	Slovenia	0	1	1	2
13	Bangladesh	0	1	0	1
13	Belgium	0	1	0	1
13	Great Britain	0	1	0	1
16	France	0	0	6	6
Totals (16 entries)		34	34	34	102
