= 2021 World Archery Championships – Men's team compound =

Archery competition

2021 World Archery Championships
Men	Recurve	Compound
Women	Recurve	Compound
Team	Men's recurve	Men's compound
Team	Women's recurve	Women's compound
Mixed team	Recurve	Compound

The men's team compound competition at the 2021 World Archery Championships took place from 21 to 24 September in Yankton, United States.

== Schedule ==
All times are Central Daylight Time (UTC−05:00).

Date	Time	Round
Tuesday, 21 September	09:00	Qualification round
Wednesday, 22 September	09:45; 10:30; 11:00; 11:30	1/12 finals 1/8 finals Quarterfinals; Semifinals
Friday, 24 September	15:04; 15:30	Bronze medal match Final

== Qualification round ==
Results after 216 arrows.

Rank	Nation	Name	Score	10+X	X
1	Turkey	Evren Çağıran; Furkan Oruç; Yakup Yıldız	2081	152	69
2	Germany	Florian Grafmans; Sebastian Hamdorf; Tim Krippendorf	2080	146	49
3	South Korea	Choi Yong-hee; Kim Jong-ho; Yang Jae-won	2074	140	55
4	Denmark	Martin Damsbo; Mathias Fullerton; Stephan Hansen	2066	138	44
5	India	Sangampreet Singh Bisla; Abhishek Verma; Rishabh Yadav	2063	134	62
6	France	Jean Philippe Boulch; Pierre-Julien Deloche; Adrien Gontier	2062	132	57
7	United Kingdom	Adam Carpenter; James Mason; Adam Ravenscroft	2062	132	54
8	Colombia	Sebastián Arenas; Juan Bonilla; Daniel Muñoz	2059	133	48
9	United States	Braden Gellenthien; James Lutz; Kris Schaff	2059	131	48
10	Russian Archery Federation	Anton Bulaev; Alexander Dambaev; Viktor Kalashnikov	2057	131	55
11	Netherlands	Sil Pater; Mike Schloesser; Max Verwoerdt	2054	129	41
12	Italy	Elia Fregnan; Sergio Pagni; Federico Pagnoni	2049	122	45
13	Austria	Stefan Heincz; Michael Matzner; Nico Wiener	2048	125	37
14	Canada	Jamie Brehaut; Andrew Fagan; Christopher Perkins	2047	123	57
15	Mexico	Miguel Becerra; Antonio Hidalgo; Uriel Olvera	2046	121	54
16	Slovenia	Aljaž Matija Brenk; Tim Jevšnik; Staš Modic	2022	109	40
17	Guatemala	Julio Barillas; José Marcelo del Cid; Pedro Salazar	2014	100	39
18	Spain	Ramón López; Miguel Ángel Medina Orta; Jesús Jacinto Pérez González	2004	90	28
19	Portugal	Cláudio Alves; Carlos Resende; Nuno Simões	1993	99	34
20	Faroe Islands	Kaj Johannesen; Nikkel Petersen; Joannes Poulsen	1963	75	27
21	Kazakhstan	Zhomart Bektursun; Akbarali Karabayev; Bunyod Mirzametov	1953	72	21
22	Chinese Taipei	Chen Hong-yi; Liu Yuan; Peng Te-yang	1924	77	19
23	Mongolia	Ganzorig Ganbaatar; Gan-Erdene Gombodorj; Otgonbayar Lkhamjav	1905	60	23
24	Saudi Arabia	Ali Alshamrani; Majdi Alsubhi; Haitham Mobark	1651	28	11

== Elimination round ==
1/12 finals
1	Turkey
Bye
17	Guatemala	234
16	Slovenia	229
9	United States	235
24	Saudi Arabia	191
Bye
8	Colombia
5	India
Bye
21	Kazakhstan	228
12	Italy	233
13	Austria	238
20	Faroe Islands	228
Bye
4	Denmark
3	South Korea
Bye
19	Portugal	231
14	Canada	230
11	Netherlands	232
22	Chinese Taipei	225
Bye
6	France
7	United Kingdom
Bye
23	Mongolia	213
10	RAF	235
15	Mexico	232
18	Spain	223
Bye
2	Germany

1/8 finals
1	Turkey	233^{30}
17	Guatemala	233^{30+}
9	United States	235
8	Colombia	231
5	India	236
12	Italy	230
13	Austria	233
4	Denmark	231
3	South Korea	235
19	Portugal	233
11	Netherlands	237
6	France	235
7	United Kingdom	232
10	RAF	230
15	Mexico	238
2	Germany	235

Quarterfinals
17	Guatemala	233
9	United States	235
5	India	235
13	Austria	238
3	South Korea	230
11	Netherlands	232
7	United Kingdom	230
15	Mexico	236

Semifinals
9	United States	232
13	Austria	231
11	Netherlands	232
15	Mexico	234

Final
9	United States	226
15	Mexico	211
Third place
13	Austria	231^{28}
11	Netherlands	231^{27}
