= 2021 World Archery Championships – Women's team compound =

Archery competition

2021 World Archery Championships
Men	Recurve	Compound
Women	Recurve	Compound
Team	Men's recurve	Men's compound
Team	Women's recurve	Women's compound
Mixed team	Recurve	Compound

The women's team compound competition at the 2021 World Archery Championships took place from 21 to 24 September in Yankton, United States.

== Schedule ==
All times are Central Daylight Time (UTC−05:00).

Date	Time	Round
Tuesday, 21 September	09:00	Qualification round
Wednesday, 22 September	10:30; 11:00; 11:30	1/8 finals Quarterfinals; Semifinals
Friday, 24 September	14:00; 14:26	Bronze medal match Final

== Qualification round ==
Results after 216 arrows.

Rank	Nation	Name	Score	10+X	X
1	Colombia	Sara López; Alejandra Usquiano; Nora Valdez	2058	130	45
2	United Kingdom	Layla Annison; Isabelle Carpenter; Ella Gibson	2023	109	40
3	United States	Linda Ochoa-Anderson; Paige Pearce; Makenna Proctor	2019	98	38
4	France	Sophie Dodemont; Lola Grandjean; Tiphaine Renaudin	2011	94	41
5	Russian Archery Federation	Natalia Avdeeva; Viktoria Balzhanova; Elizaveta Knyazeva	2008	96	38
6	South Korea	Kim Yun-hee; So Chae-won; Song Yun-soo	2007	96	33
7	India	Priya Gurjar; Muskan Kirar; Jyothi Surekha Vennam	1994	89	36
8	Turkey	Yeşim Bostan; Gizem Elmaağaçlı; Ayşe Bera Süzer	1993	92	41
9	Netherlands	Sanne de Laat; Martine Stas-Couwenberg; Inge van der Ven	1992	90	21
10	Denmark	Erika Damsbo; Tanja Gellenthien; Natacha Stütz	1989	88	38
11	Estonia	Lisell Jäätma; Meeri-Marita Paas; Maris Tetsmann	1980	87	24
12	Mexico	Andrea Becerra; Brenda Merino; Esmeralda Sánchez	1969	93	34
13	Italy	Paola Natale; Elisa Roner; Marcella Tonioli	1962	76	34
14	Germany	Julia Böhnke; Carolin Landesfeind; Jennifer Walter	1958	76	28
15	Chinese Taipei	Hsu Chi-huei; Lin Ming-ching; Liu Shu-ting	1952	70	19
16	Portugal	Johana Horta De Oliveira; Rita Pereira; Giselle Pauline Zaandam De Sousa	1844	46	15

== Elimination round ==
1/8 finals
1	Colombia	234
16	Portugal	210
9	Netherlands	221
8	Turkey	229
5	RAF	228
12	Mexico	227
13	Italy	230
4	France	232
3	United States	236
14	Germany	224
11	Estonia	232
6	South Korea	231
7	India	235
10	Denmark	226
15	Chinese Taipei	223
2	United Kingdom	233

Quarterfinals
1	Colombia	231
8	Turkey	230
5	RAF	222^{28}
4	France	222^{28}
3	United States	227
11	Estonia	223
7	India	230^{30}
2	United Kingdom	230^{28}

Semifinals
1	Colombia	234
4	France	220
3	United States	225
7	India	226

Final
1	Colombia	229
7	India	224
Third place
4	France	222
3	United States	229
