= 2025 Indoor Archery World Series =

International archery competition

- Organised by: World Archery
- Previous event: 2024 Indoor Archery World Series
- Next event: 2026 Indoor Archery World Series
- Website: https://www.worldarchery.sport

The 2025 Indoor Archery World Series was the seventh edition of the annual indoor archery circuit founded by World Archery. The calendar included seven events held across Europe, Asia, and North America.

== Calendar ==
Data	Location	Fonte
1–3 November 2024	(Switzerland) Losanna	
15–17 November 2024	(Luxembourg) Strassen	
6–8 December 2024	(Chinese Taipei) Taoyuan	
17–19 January 2025	(France) Nîmes	
13–14 February 2025	(United States) Chicago	
5–9 March 2025	(United States) Las Vegas	
9 March 2025	(United States) Las Vegas FINALS	

== Winners ==
=== Man ===
==== Ricurve bow ====
Games	Gold	Silver	Bronze
Losanna	(Italy) Alessandro Paoli	(France) Romain Fichet	(India) Atanu Das
Strassen	(France) Anthony Barbier	(Croatia) Alen Remar	(Italy) Mauro Nespoli
Taoyuan	(Italy) Mauro Nespoli	(South Korea) Ku Bonchan	(South Korea) Lee Seungshin
Nîmes	(United States) Brady Ellison	(Germany) Florian Unruh	(France) Thomas Chirault
Chicago	(Canada) Devaang Gupta	(United States) Brady Ellison	(United States) Nicholas D’Amour
Las Vegas	(United States) Brady Ellison	(France) Thomas Chirault	(Mexico) Matias Grande
Las Vegas Finals	(United States) Brady Ellison	(Turkey) Mete Gazoz	(France) Thomas Chirault

==== Compound ====
Games	Gold	Silver	Bronze
Losanna	(Netherlands) Mike Schloesser	(Denmark) Mathias Fullerton	(United States) Braden Gellenthien
Strassen	(Netherlands) Mike Schloesser	(India) Abhishek Verma	(France) Nicolas Girard
Taoyuan	(Netherlands) Mike Schloesser	(Chinese Taipei) Chen Chieh-Lun	(India) Prathamesh Bhalchandra Fuge
Nîmes	(Austria) Nico Wiener	(India) Rishabh Yadav	(Denmark) Mathias Fullerton
Chicago	(Netherlands) Mike Schloesser	(United States) James Lutz	(Denmark) Mathias Fullerton
Las Vegas	(United States) Bodie Turner	(France) Nicolas Girard	(Canada) Christopher Perkins
Las Vegas Finals	(Austria) Nico Wiener	(France) Nicolas Girard	(Netherlands) Mike Schloesser

=== Woman ===
==== Ricurve bow ====
Games	Gold	Silver	Bronze
Losanna	(Slovakia) Denisa Barankova	(Switzerland) Olivia Doigo	(Estonia) Reena Parnat
Strassen	(South Korea) Duna Lim	(South Korea) Hana Lim	(France) Jennifer Devaux
Taoyuan	(Japan) Uehara Ruka	(South Korea) Eunah Lee	(India) Ankita Bhakat
Nîmes	(United Kingdom) Penny Healey	(Italy) Lucilla Boari	(France) Victoria Sebastian
Chicago	(United States) Casey Kaufhold	(Colombia) Ana Rendón	(Netherlands) Gaby Schloesser
Las Vegas	(United States) Casey Kaufhold	(France) Victoria Sebastian	(Germany) Katharina Bauer
Las Vegas Finals	(United States) Casey Kaufhold	(France) Lisa Barbelin	(Slovakia) Denisa Barankova

==== Compound ====
Games	Gold	Silver	Bronze
Losanna	(Estonia) Lisell Jaatma	(Italy) Giulia Di Nardo	(Denmark) Tanja Gellenthien
Strassen	(India) Jyothi Surekha Vennam	(Belgium) Sarah Prieels	(Italy) Elisa Roner
Taoyuan	(India) Jyothi Surekha Vennam	(Chinese Taipei) Yu-ju Chen	(Chinese Taipei) Chen Yi-Hsuan
Nîmes	(Colombia) Alejandra Usquiano	(India) Jyothi Surekha Vennam	(Croatia) Amanda Mlinaric
Chicago	(United Kingdom) Sarah Prieels	(Estonia) Lisell Jaatma	(United States) Olivia Dean
Las Vegas	(United States) Gracen Fletcher	(United States) Paige Pearce	(United Kingdom) Ella Gibson
Las Vegas Finals	(Denmark) Tanja Gellenthien	(Belgium) Sarah Prieels	(Italy) Elisa Roner

== Medal collection ==
Rank	Nation	Gold	Silver	Bronze	Total
1	United States	8	3	3	14
2	Netherlands	4	0	0	4
3	India	2	3	3	8
4	Italy	2	2	2	6
5	Austria	2	0	0	2
5	United Kingdom	2	0	0	2
7	France	1	6	6	13
8	South Korea	1	3	3	7
9	Denmark	1	1	1	3
9	Estonia	1	1	1	3
11	Colombia	1	1	0	2
12	Canada	1	0	0	1
12	Japan	1	0	0	1
12	Slovakia	1	0	0	1
15	Belgium	0	2	2	4
15	Chinese Taipei	0	2	2	4
17	Croatia	0	1	1	2
17	Germany	0	1	1	2
17	Turkey	0	1	1	2
20	Mexico	0	0	0	0
Totals (20 entries)		28	27	26	81
