= 2024 Indoor Archery World Series =

International archery competition

- Organised by: World Archery
- Previous event: 2023 Indoor Archery World Series
- Next event: 2025 Indoor Archery World Series
- Website: https://www.worldarchery.sport

The 2024 Indoor Archery World Series was the sixth edition of the annual indoor archery circuit founded by World Archery. The calendar included six events held across Europe, Asia, and North America.

== Calendar ==
Data	Location	Fonte
27–29 october 2023	(Switzerland) Losanna	
17–19 november 2023	(Luxembourg) Strassen	
8–10 december 2023	(Chinese Taipei) Taipei	
19–21 january 2024	(France) Nîmes	
2–4 february 2024	(United States) Las Vegas	
4 february 2024	(United States) Las Vegas FINALS	

== Winners ==
=== Man ===
==== Ricurve bow ====
Games	Gold	Silver	Bronze
Losanna	(Netherlands) Steve Wijler	(France) Jerome Bidault	(Italy) Alessandro Paoli
Strassen	(Netherlands) Steve Wijler	(United Kingdom) Tom Hall	(Netherlands) Willem Bakker
Taipei	(Chinese Taipei) Tai Yu-Hsuan	(Chinese Taipei) Tang Chih-Chun	(Chinese Taipei) Su Yu-Yang
Nîmes	(Israel) Roy Dror	(Netherlands) Steve Wijler	(Brazil) Marcus D'Almeida
Las Vegas	(United States) Brady Ellison	(Brazil) Marcus D'Almeida	(Canada) Eric Pete
Las Vegas Finals	(United States) Brady Ellison	(Brazil) Marcus D'Almeida	(Netherlands) Steve Wijler

==== Compound ====
Games	Gold	Silver	Bronze
Losanna	(Netherlands) Mike Schloesser	(France) Nicolas Girard	(Denmark) Mathias Fullerton
Strassen	(United States) James Lutz	(Denmark) Stephan Hansen	(Denmark) Mathias Fullerton
Taipei	(India) Prathamesh Samadhan Jawkar	(Netherlands) Mike Schloesser	(India) Aman Saini
Nîmes	(Netherlands) Mike Schloesser	(United States) James Lutz	(France) Nicolas Girard
Las Vegas	(Netherlands) Mike Schloesser (Denmark) Mathias Fullerton	Non assegnato	(United States) James Lutz (France) Nicolas Girard
Las Vegas Finals	(United States) James Lutz	(Netherlands) Mike Schloesser	(Denmark) Mathias Fullerton

=== Women ===
==== Ricurve bow ====
Games	Gold	Silver	Bronze
Losanna	(Slovakia) Denisa Barankova	(Netherlands) Laura van der Winkel	(Estonia) Reena Parnat
Strassen	(United States) James Lutz	(Denmark) Stephan Hansen	(Denmark) Mathias Fullerton
Taipei	(Chinese Taipei) Lei Chien-Ying	(Chinese Taipei) Su Hsin-Yu	(Chinese Taipei) Chih Yu Lin
Nîmes	(Spain) Elia Canales	(Germany) Charline Schwarz	(Germany) Michelle Kroppen
Las Vegas	(South Korea) Duna Lim	(United States) Casey Kaufhold	(Czech Republic) Marie Horackova
Las Vegas Finals	(Germany) Michelle Kroppen	(United States) Casey Kaufhold	(Czech Republic) Marie Horackova

==== Compound ====
Games	Gold	Silver	Bronze
Losanna	(Italy) Paola Natale	(Italy) Marcella Tonioli	(Philippines) Andrea Robles
Strassen	(United States) Paige Pearce	(United Kingdom) Ella Gibson	(Estonia) Lisell Jaatma
Taipei	(India) Parneet Kaur	(India) Jyothi Surekha Vennam	(Chinese Taipei) Chen Yi-Hsuan
Nîmes	(Colombia) Alejandra Usquiano	(Mexico) Andrea Becerra	(Luxembourg) Mariya Klein
Las Vegas	(United States) Olivia Dean	(United Kingdom) Ella Gibson	(United States) Alexis Ruiz (Denmark) Tanja Gellenthien
Las Vegas Finals	(Italy) Elisa Roner	(United Kingdom) Ella Gibson	(United States) Paige Pearce

== Medal collection ==
Rank	Nation	Gold	Silver	Bronze	Total
1	Netherlands	6	4	4	14
2	United States	6	3	3	12
3	Chinese Taipei	2	2	2	6
4	India	2	1	1	4
4	Italy	2	1	1	4
6	Denmark	1	2	2	5
7	Germany	1	1	1	3
8	Colombia	1	0	0	1
8	Israel	1	0	0	1
8	Slovakia	1	0	0	1
8	South Korea	1	0	0	1
8	Spain	1	0	0	1
13	United Kingdom	0	4	4	8
14	Brazil	0	2	2	4
14	France	0	2	2	4
16	Mexico	0	1	1	2
17	Canada	0	0	0	0
17	Czech Republic	0	0	0	0
17	Estonia	0	0	0	0
17	Luxembourg	0	0	0	0
17	Philippines	0	0	0	0
Totals (21 entries)		25	23	23	71
