= Anders Faugstad =

Norwegian archer (born 1999)

Personal information
- Born: 13 November 1999 (age 26)

Sport
- Country: Norway
- Sport: Archery
- Event: Compound
Medal record
Men's compound archery
Representing Norway
World Championships
Silver medal – second place	2019 's-Hertogenbosch	Individual
World Youth Archery Championships
Gold medal – first place	2019 Madrid	Individual
World Cup
Silver medal – second place	2022 Paris	Individual

Anders Faugstad (born 13 November 1999) is a Norwegian archer competing in compound events. He won the silver medal in the men's individual compound event at the 2019 World Archery Championships held in 's-Hertogenbosch, Netherlands. In the final, he was defeated by James Lutz of the United States. In 2019, Faugstad secured the gold medal in the junior men's individual compound event at the World Youth Archery Championships held in Madrid, Spain.

In 2020, Faugstad finished in 2nd place in the inaugural Lockdown Knockout tournament organised by World Archery. In the final he lost against Sara López of Colombia. In 2021, he competed in the men's individual compound event at the World Archery Championships held in Yankton, United States.
