= Elisa Roner =

Italian archer (born 2001)

Personal information
- Born: 4 July 2001 (age 24)

Sport
- Country: Italy
- Sport: Archery
- Event: Compound
Medal record
Women's compound archery
Representing Italy
Archery World Cup
Bronze medal – third place	2023 Antalya	Individual
Gold medal – first place	2024 Antalya	Individual
Bronze medal – third place	2024 Antalya	Mixed team
Silver medal – second place	2024 Shanghai	Team
Silver medal – second place	2025 Central Florida	Team
Indoor Archery World Series
Gold medal – first place	2023 Las Vegas (Finals)	Individual
Gold medal – first place	2024 Las Vegas (Finals)	Individual
Bronze medal – third place	2024 Strassen	Individual
Bronze medal – third place	2025 Las Vegas (Finals)	Individual
Silver medal – second place	2025 Lousanne	Individual
Silver medal – second place	2025 Strassen	Individual
World Indoor Archery Championships
Silver medal – second place	2018 Yankton	Individual
Bronze medal – third place	2018 Yankton	Team
European Games
Gold medal – first place	2023 Kraków-Małopolska	Individual
Bronze medal – third place	2023 Kraków-Małopolska	Mixed team
European Outdoor Championships
Silver medal – second place	2022 Munich	Team
Silver medal – second place	2024 Essen	Individual
Silver medal – second place	2026 Antalya	Team
European Indoor Championships
Bronze medal – third place	2022 Laško	Team
Gold medal – first place	2024 Varaždin	Individual
Silver medal – second place	2024 Varaždin	Team
Gold medal – first place	2025 Samsun	Individual
Gold medal – first place	2025 Samsun	Team
Gold medal – first place	2026 Plovdiv	Team
Gold medal – first place	2026 Plovdiv	Mixed Team

Elisa Roner (born 4 July 2001) is an Italian archer competing in compound events. She won the gold medal in the women's compound event at the 2023 European Games held in Poland. She won the silver medal in her event at the 2024 European Archery Championships held in Essen, Germany.

== Career ==
Roner, Camilla Alberti and Erica Benzini won the bronze medal in the junior women's team compound event at the 2017 European Indoor Archery Championships held in Vittel, France. She also competed in the junior women's compound event. Roner won two medals at the 2018 World Indoor Archery Championships held in Yankton, United States. She won the silver medal in the junior women's individual compound event and the bronze medal in the junior women's team compound event, alongside Elisa Bazzichetto and Sara Ret. This event will later be renamed Indoor Archery World Series and Elisa will win the Finals in Las Vegas in 2023 and 2024.

Roner won two gold medals in junior events at the 2019 European Indoor Archery Championships held in Samsun, Turkey. In that same year, she won the bronze medal in the junior women's compound event at the 2019 World Archery Youth Championships held in Madrid, Spain. In 2021, Roner competed at the World Archery Championships held in Yankton, United States. She competed in the women's compound and women's team compound events. In the individual event, she was eliminated in her second match by Natalia Avdeeva of Russia and in the team event, the Italian team was eliminated by France in the first match of the elimination round.

Roner, Irene Franchini and Marcella Tonioli won the bronze medal in the women's team compound event at the 2022 European Indoor Archery Championships held in Laško, Slovenia. Sara Ret, Marcella Tonioli and Elisa Roner won the silver medal in the women's team compound event at the 2022 European Archery Championships held in Munich, Germany. She lost her bronze medal match in the women's individual compound event.

In 2023, she represented Italy at the European Games held in Poland. She won the gold medal in the women's individual compound event. Roner and Marco Bruno won the bronze medal in the mixed team compound event. In the same year, she also competed at the World Archery Championships held in Berlin, Germany. She competed in the women's individual compound, women's team compound and compound mixed team events.

Roner won the gold medal in the women's individual compound event at the 2024 European Indoor Archery Championships held in Varaždin, Croatia. She won the silver medal in the women's team compound event, alongside Andrea Nicole Moccia and Marcella Tonioli. A few months later, she won the silver medal in the women's individual compound event at the European Archery Championships held in Essen, Germany.
