= Alexandra Mîrca =

Moldovan archer (born 1993)

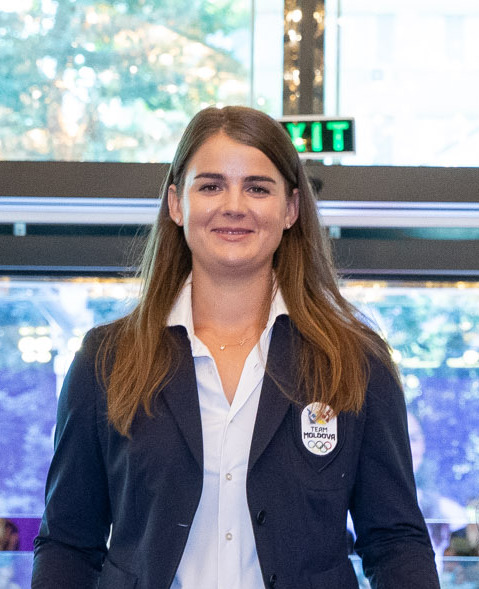
- Mîrca in 2024

Personal information
- Nationality: Moldova
- Born: 11 October 1993 (age 32) Chișinău, Moldova
- Height: 1.68 m (5 ft 6 in)
- Weight: 70 kg (154 lb)

Sport
- Sport: Archery
Medal record
Women's recurve archery
Representing Moldova
European Indoor Championships
Gold medal – first place	2026 Plovdiv	Team
Bronze medal – third place	2024 Varaždin	Team

Alexandra Mîrca (born 11 October 1993) is a Moldovan archer. She competed in the 2016 Summer Olympics. She competed at the 2020 Summer Olympics, in women's individual, and mixed team. Mîrca also competed at the 2024 Summer Olympics.

She competed at the 2010 Summer Youth Olympics, in Singapore, and 2019 European Games .

== Individual performance timeline in Outdoor Recurve ==
Tournament	2010	2011	2012	2013	2014	2015	2016	2017	2018	2019	2020	2021	SR
World Archery tournaments
Olympic Games			DNQ				2R					1R	0/2
World Championships		1R		3R		1R		3R		QF			0/5
World Cup													
Stage 1		2R	3R								NH		0/2
Stage 2	1R	3R	2R	1R		1R		4R			NH	QF	0/7
Stage 3			1R		1R		4R			2R	NH		0/4
Stage 4					1R			4R		3R	NH		0/3
World Cup Final	DNQ	DNQ	DNQ	DNQ	DNQ	DNQ	DNQ	DNQ	DNQ	DNQ	NH		0/0
End of year world ranking		184	127	104	186	216	35	22	60	38	34		
