= Toja Ellison =

Slovenian archer (born 1993)

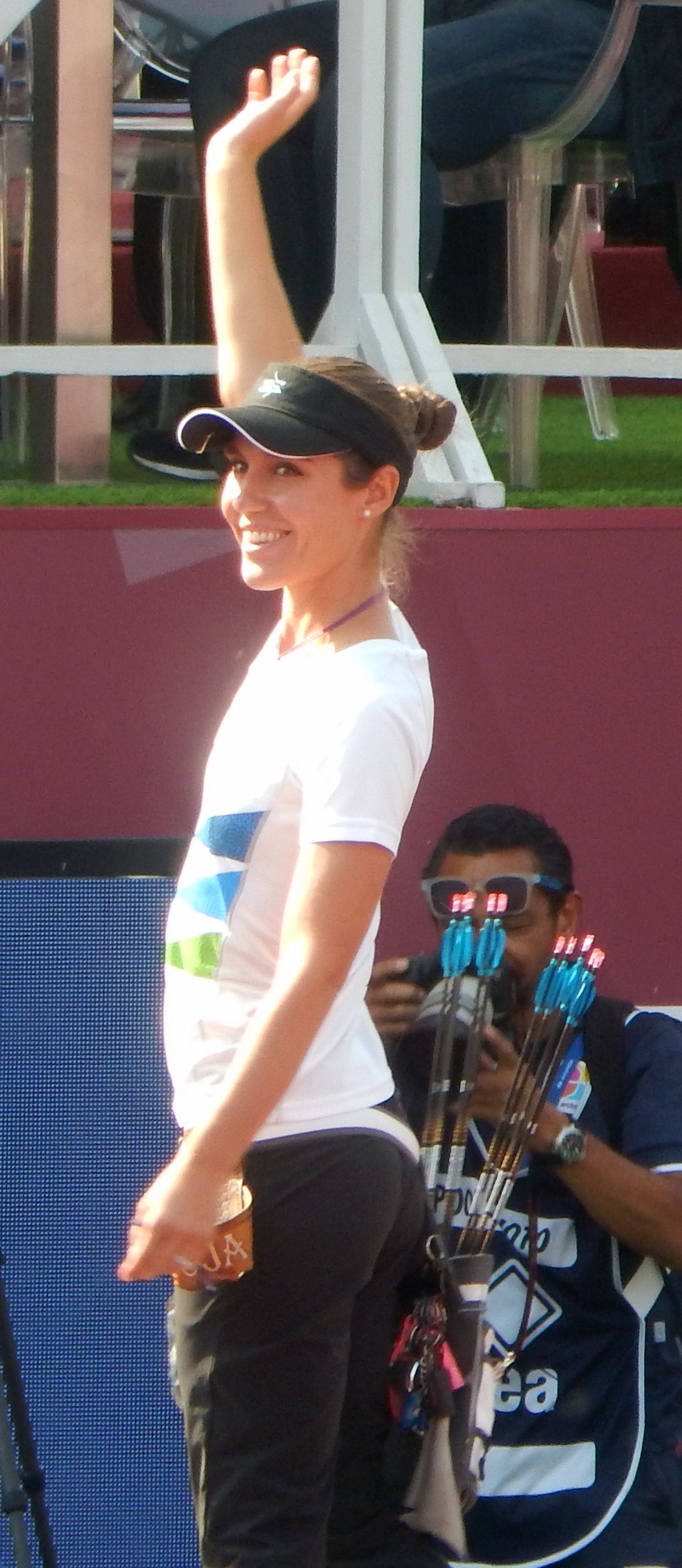
- Ellison in 2019

Personal information
- Born: Toja Černe; 4 July 1993 (age 33) Ljubljana, Slovenia
- Spouse: Brady Ellison

Sport
- Country: Slovenia
- Sport: Archery
- Event: Compound
Medal record
Women's compound archery
Representing Slovenia
World Field Championships
Gold medal – first place	2024 Lac La Biche	Mixed team
Silver medal – second place	2022 Yankton	Individual
European Games
Gold medal – first place	2019 Minsk	Individual
World Games
Silver medal – second place	2017 Wrocław	Individual
Summer Universiade
Silver medal – second place	2015 Gwangju	Individual

Toja Ellison (née Černe, born 4 July 1993) is a Slovenian compound archer. At the 2019 European Games held in Minsk, Belarus, she won the gold medal in the women's individual compound event.

== Career ==
In 2017, she won the silver medal in the women's individual compound event at the World Games held in Wrocław, Poland.

In 2019, alongside Staš Modic, she won a silver medal in the mixed team event at the Archery World Cup in Berlin. In 2020, she finished in 14th place in the women's compound event at The Vegas Shoot held in Las Vegas, United States. She also competed in the inaugural Lockdown Knockout tournament organised by World Archery without winning a medal.

In 2021, she lost her bronze medal match in the women's individual compound event at the World Archery Championships held in Yankton, United States. She also competed in the mixed team event.

She lost her bronze medal match in the women's individual compound event at the 2022 World Games held in Birmingham, Alabama, United States.

== Personal life ==
Ellison was born and raised in Ljubljana, Slovenia. In April 2016, she married recurve archer Brady Ellison.
