= James Lutz =

American archer (born 1998)

Personal information
- Born: March 31, 1998 (age 28)

Sport
- Country: United States
- Sport: Archery
- Event: Compound
Medal record
Men's compound archery
Representing United States
World Championships
Gold medal – first place	2019 's-Hertogenbosch	Individual
Gold medal – first place	2021 Yankton	Team
Indoor Archery World Series
Gold medal – first place	2023 Strassen	Individual
Silver medal – second place	2024 Nimes	Individual
Bronze medal – third place	2024 Las Vegas	Individual
Gold medal – first place	2024 Las Vegas	Individual
Silver medal – second place	2025 Chicago	Individual
Pan American Championships
Gold medal – first place	2022 Santiago	Team
Gold medal – first place	2026 Tlaxcala	Team
Gold medal – first place	2026 Tlaxcala	Mixed team
Bronze medal – third place	2022 Santiago	Mixed team

James Lutz (born March 31, 1998) is an American compound archer. He became world champion in the men's individual compound event at the 2019 World Archery Championships held in 's-Hertogenbosch, Netherlands. He is the fifth compound archer from the United States to become world champion in this event. In the final, he defeated Anders Faugstad of Norway.

== Career ==
In 2020, he finished in 26th place in the men's compound event at The Vegas Shoot held in Las Vegas, United States.

In 2021, Lutz won the gold medal in the men's team event at the World Archery Championships held in Yankton, United States. He also competed in the men's individual compound and mixed team events.

Lutz represented the United States at the 2022 World Games held in Birmingham, Alabama, United States. He competed in the men's individual compound event. He won two medals at the 2022 Pan American Archery Championships held in Santiago, Chile: the gold medal in the men's team event and the bronze medal in the mixed team event.
