= Inés de Velasco =

Spanish archer (born 2002)

Personal information
- Full name: Inés de Velasco Martínez
- Nationality: Spanish
- Born: 14 March 2002 (age 23); Madrid, Spain

Sport
- Sport: Archery

Inés de Velasco Martínez (Note: In this Spanish name, the first or paternal surname is de Velasco and the second or maternal family name is Martínez.) (born 14 March 2002) is a Spanish archer. She competed in the women's individual event at the 2020 Summer Olympics.
