= Nora Valdez =

Colombian archer (born 1997)

Personal information
- Born: 9 September 1997 (age 28)

Sport
- Country: Colombia
- Sport: Archery
- Event: Compound archery
Medal record
Representing Colombia
Women's compound archery
Event	1st	2nd	3rd
World Championships	2	0	0
World Youth Championships	0	1	1
World Cup	3	1	1
Pan American Championships	2	2	0
CAC Games	0	1	0
South American Games	1	1	0
Bolivarian Games	1	0	1
Total	9	6	3
World Championships
Gold medal – first place	2017 Mexico City	Team
Gold medal – first place	2021 Yankton	Team
Pan American Championships
Gold medal – first place	2021 Monterrey	Individual
Gold medal – first place	2021 Monterrey	Team
Silver medal – second place	2018 Medellín	Individual
Silver medal – second place	2018 Medellín	Team
Central American and Caribbean Games
Silver medal – second place	2018 Barranquilla	Team
South American Games
Gold medal – first place	2018 Cochabamba	Team
Silver medal – second place	2018 Cochabamba	Individual
Bolivarian Games
Gold medal – first place	2017 Santa Marta	Team
Bronze medal – third place	2017 Santa Marta	Individual 50 m
World Youth Championships
Silver medal – second place	2015 Yankton	Team
Bronze medal – third place	2017 Rosario	Mixed team

Nora Valdez (born 9 September 1997) is a Colombian compound archer. She won the gold medal in the women's team event at the 2017 World Archery Championships held in Mexico City, Mexico. In 2021, she also won the gold medal in the women's team event at the World Archery Championships held in Yankton, United States.
