= Paige Pearce =

American archer (born 1995)

Personal information
- Full name: Paige Pearce Gore
- Born: March 21, 1995 (age 31) California, U.S.
- Home town: Red Bluff, California, U.S.
- Education: Shasta College

Sport
- Country: United States
- Sport: Archery
- Event: Compound
Medal record
Women's compound archery
Representing United States
World Championships
Silver medal – second place	2019 's-Hertogenbosch	Individual
Silver medal – second place	2019 's-Hertogenbosch	Team
Bronze medal – third place	2021 Yankton	Team
World Field Championships
Gold medal – first place	2022 Yankton	Individual
Gold medal – first place	2022 Yankton	Mixed team
Gold medal – first place	2024 Lac La Biche	Individual
Silver medal – second place	2024 Lac La Biche	Team
Silver medal – second place	2024 Lac La Biche	Mixed team
World Games
Bronze medal – third place	2022 Birmingham	Individual
Pan American Games
Bronze medal – third place	2019 Lima	Individual
Pan American Championships
Gold medal – first place	2018 Medellín	Mixed team
Gold medal – first place	2022 Santiago	Individual
Silver medal – second place	2012 San Salvador	Team
Bronze medal – third place	2018 Medellín	Team
Bronze medal – third place	2022 Santiago	Team
Bronze medal – third place	2022 Santiago	Mixed team

Paige Pearce (born March 21, 1995) is an American compound archer. She won two medals at the 2019 World Archery Championships held in 's-Hertogenbosch, Netherlands: the silver medal in the women's individual compound event and also the silver medal in the women's team compound event.

== Career ==
Pearce won two medals at the 2018 Pan American Archery Championships held in Medellín, Colombia: the gold medal in the mixed team compound event and the bronze medal in the women's team compound event.

In 2019, Pearce won the bronze medal in the women's individual event at the Pan American Games held in Lima, Peru. In 2020, she won the women's compound event at the Vegas Shoot held in Las Vegas, United States. Pearce also competed in the inaugural Lockdown Knockout tournament organised by World Archery where she was ultimately eliminated by Sara López of Colombia.

Pearce won the bronze medal in the women's team compound event at the 2021 World Archery Championships held in Yankton, South Dakota, United States. She also competed in the women's individual compound and compound mixed team events.

In January 2022, Pearce finished in second place in the Women's Open Pro event at the Lancaster Archery Classic held near Lancaster, Pennsylvania, United States.

Pearce represented the United States at the 2022 World Games held in Birmingham, Alabama, United States. She won the bronze medal in the women's compound event. She defeated Toja Ellison of Slovenia in her bronze medal match. In that same year, Pearce won three medals at the Pan American Archery Championships held in Santiago, Chile, including the gold medal in the women's individual compound event.

In 2024, she won three medals at the World Field Archery Championships held in Lac La Biche, Canada: she won the gold medal in the women's individual compound event, the silver medal in the women's team compound event and the silver medal in the mixed team compound event.

== Achievements ==
Year	Competition	Location	Rank	Event
2018	Pan American Archery Championships	Medellín, Colombia	3rd	Team
2018	Pan American Archery Championships	Medellín, Colombia	1st	Mixed team
2019	World Archery Championships	's-Hertogenbosch, Netherlands	2nd	Individual
2019	World Archery Championships	's-Hertogenbosch, Netherlands	2nd	Team
2019	Pan American Games	Lima, Peru	3rd	Individual
2021	World Archery Championships	Yankton, United States	3rd	Team
2022	World Games	Birmingham, United States	3rd	Individual
2022	Pan American Archery Championships	Santiago, Chile	1st	Individual
2022	Pan American Archery Championships	Santiago, Chile	3rd	Team
2022	Pan American Archery Championships	Santiago, Chile	3rd	Mixed team
