= Furkan Oruç =

Turkish compound archer

Personal information
- National team: 2016
- Born: 18 December 1996 (age 29) Yalova, Turkey

Sport
- Country: Turkey
- Sport: Archery
- Event: compound
- Team: Archers Foundation (Okçular Vakfı)
Medal record
Men's Archery
Representing Turkey
World Cup
Gold medal – first place	2021 Lausanne	Team
European Championships
Gold medal – first place	2021 Antalya	Team
European Indoor Championships
Silver medal – second place	2022 Laško	Team

Furkan Oruç (born 18 December 1996) is a Turkish male compound archer and part of the national team.

== Private life ==
Furkan Oruç was born in Yalova, Turkey on 18 December 1996.

== Sport career ==
Oruç is a member of Yalova Gençlik Hizmetleri Sports Club, where he is coached by Efrahim Canfes.

In 2016, he was admitted to Turkey national team. Oruç won the gold medal together with his teammates in the second leg of the 2021 Archery World Cup in Lausanne, Switzerland. Hetook the gold medal in the team event of the 2021 European Archery Championships held in Antalya, Turkey.

He won the silver medal in the men's team compound event at the 2022 European Indoor Archery Championships held in Laško, Slovenia.

He won the silver medal in the men's team compound event at the Laško, Slovenia event in the 2022 European Indoor Archery Championships.
