= Mathias Fullerton =

Danish archer (born 2003)

Personal information
- Born: 27 May 2003 (age 23)

Sport
- Sport: Archery
- Event: Compound
Medal record
Men's compound archery
Representing Denmark
World Games
Gold medal – first place	2025 Chengdu	Mixed team
World Championships
Silver medal – second place	2023 Berlin	Team
Silver medal – second place	2025 Gwangju	Individual
European Games
Silver medal – second place	2023 Kraków-Małopolska	Mixed team
European Championships
Gold medal – first place	2024 Essen	Individual
Silver medal – second place	2021 Antalya	Individual
Bronze medal – third place	2024 Essen	Team
Bronze medal – third place	2026 Antalya	Mixed team
European Indoor Championships
Gold medal – first place	2024 Varaždin	Team
Bronze medal – third place	2025 Samsun	Individual
Bronze medal – third place	2025 Samsun	Team
Indoor World Cup
Bronze medal – third place	2025 Luxembourg	Individual

Mathias Fullerton (born 27 May 2003) is a Danish archer competing in compound events. He won the gold medal in the men's compound event at the 2024 European Archery Championships held in Essen, Germany. He won the silver medal in his event at the 2021 European Archery Championships held in Antalya, Turkey.

Fullerton is also a silver medalist in (mixed) team events at the 2023 World Archery Championships and 2023 European Games.

== Career ==
In 2019, Fullerton, Tore Bjarnarson and Christoffer Berg won the silver medal in the cadet men's team compound event at the World Archery Youth Championships held in Madrid, Spain. He won the silver medal in the men's compound event at the 2021 European Archery Championships held in Antalya, Turkey. Fullerton also competed in the men's individual compound, men's team compound and mixed team compound events at the 2021 World Archery Championships held in Yankton, United States. In the individual event, he lost his bronze medal match against Robin Jäätma of Estonia.

Fullerton represented Denmark at the 2022 World Games held in Birmingham, United States. He competed in the men's individual compound and mixed team compound events. In the individual event, he was eliminated by Roberto Hernández of El Salvador in the second match of the competition bracket and in the mixed team event, the Danish team was eliminated by Mexico in the first match of the elimination round.

Fullerton and Tanja Gellenthien won the silver medal in the mixed team compound event at the 2023 European Games held in Poland. He also competed in the men's individual compound event. Fullerton, Tore Bjarnarson and Rasmus Bramsen won the gold medal in the men's team compound event at the 2023 World Archery Youth Championships held in Limerick, Ireland. He won the bronze medal in the men's individual compound event.

In the same year, Fullerton, Martin Damsbo and Tore Bjarnarson won the silver medal in the men's team compound event at the 2023 World Archery Championships held in Berlin, Germany. He also competed in the men's individual compound and mixed team compound events.

Fullerton won the men's compound event at the 2024 Vegas Shoot held in Las Vegas, United States. In the same month, Fullerton, Martin Damsbo and Tore Bjarnarson won the gold medal in the men's team compound event at the 2024 European Indoor Archery Championships held in Varaždin, Croatia. He also competed in the men's compound event. A few months later, Fullerton won the gold medal in his event at the 2024 European Archery Championships held in Essen, Germany. He defeated Shamai Yamrom of Israel in his gold medal match. Fullerton also won the bronze medal in the men's team event, alongside Rasmus Bramsen and Nicklas Bredal Bryld.

Fullerton won the silver medal in the men's individual compound event at the 2025 World Archery Championships held in Gwangju, South Korea.
