= Miki Nakamura =

Japanese archer (born 1992)

Personal information
- Nationality: Japanese
- Born: 12 September 1992 (age 33) Tsuruoka, Yamagata, Japan
- Education: Nippon Sport Science University
- Height: 162 cm (5 ft 4 in)
- Weight: 74 kg (163 lb)

Sport
- Sport: Archery

Miki Nakamura (中村美樹, Nakamura Miki; born 12 September 1992) is a Japanese archer. She competed in the women's individual event at the 2020 Summer Olympics.
