= 2021 World Archery Championships – Compound mixed team =

Archery competition

The mixed team compound competition at the 2021 World Archery Championships took place from 21 to 24 September in Yankton, United States.

== Schedule ==
All times are Central Daylight Time (UTC−05:00).

Date	Time	Round
Tuesday, 21 September	09:00; 17:45	Qualification round 1/12 finals
Wednesday, 22 September	16:45; 17:10; 17:35	1/8 finals Quarterfinals; Semifinals
Friday, 24 September	16:08; 16:27	Bronze medal match Final

== Qualification round ==
Rank	Nation	Name	Score	10+X	X
1	Turkey	Yeşim Bostan; Evren Çağıran	1383	90	42
2	Colombia	Sara López; Daniel Muñoz	1382	99	32
3	United Kingdom	Ella Gibson; Adam Carpenter	1380	90	34
4	Netherlands	Sanne de Laat; Mike Schloesser	1380	90	28
5	India	Jyothi Surekha Vennam; Abhishek Verma	1379	86	48
6	Denmark	Tanja Gellenthien; Mathias Fullerton	1377	93	28
7	United States	Paige Pearce; James Lutz	1375	86	27
8	South Korea	Kim Yun-hee; Kim Jong-ho	1373	88	28
9	Slovenia	Toja Ellison; Aljaž Matija Brenk	1367	86	34
10	Mexico	Andrea Becerra; Miguel Becerra	1366	85	33
11	France	Sophie Dodemont; Adrien Gontier	1365	84	38
12	Russian Archery Federation	Natalia Avdeeva; Anton Bulaev	1364	84	39
13	Spain	Andrea Marcos; Ramón López	1364	77	25
14	Croatia	Amanda Mlinarić; Mario Vavro	1362	81	31
15	Estonia	Meeri-Marita Paas; Robin Jäätma	1358	75	30
16	Italy	Marcella Tonioli; Elia Fregnan	1356	77	29
17	Germany	Jennifer Walter; Tim Krippendorf	1355	78	25
18	Canada	Fiona McClean; Christopher Perkins	1344	78	37
19	Guatemala	María José Zebadúa; Julio Barillas	1344	68	22
20	Ukraine	Oleksandra Hrabik; Serhiy Atamanenko	1331	65	26
21	Chinese Taipei	Lin Ming-ching; Peng Te-yang	1330	57	15
22	Luxembourg	Mariya Shkolna; Arnaud Hocevar	1329	55	24
23	Portugal	Johana Horta De Oliveira; Nuno Simões	1302	57	18
24	Japan	Etsuko Miyata; Kazune Nakamura	1302	49	21
25	Iceland	Anna María Alfreðsdóttir; Alfreð Birgisson	1266	33	11
26	Mongolia	Mungunchimeg Batjargal; Otgonbayar Lkhamjav	1241	38	16
27	Panama	Astrid Barría; Edgar Francisco Barsallo Moreno	1224	32	12

== Elimination round ==
1/12 finals
1	Turkey
Bye
17	Germany	149
16	Italy	152
9	Slovenia	150
24	Japan	141
Bye
8	South Korea
5	India
Bye
21	Chinese Taipei	147
12	RAF	148
13	Spain	143
20	Ukraine	145
Bye
4	Netherlands
3	Great Britain
Bye
19	Guatemala	150
14	Croatia	141
11	France	149
22	Luxembourg	150
Bye
6	Denmark
7	United States
Bye
23	Portugal	142
10	Mexico	152
15	Estonia	151
18	Canada	150
Bye
2	Colombia

1/8 finals
1	Turkey	154
16	Italy	155
9	Slovenia	155
8	South Korea	156
5	India	157
12	RAF	150
20	Ukraine	153
4	Netherlands	157
3	Great Britain	150
19	Guatemala	154
22	Luxembourg	153
6	Denmark	155
7	United States	155
10	Mexico	157
15	Estonia	149
2	Colombia	152

Quarterfinals
16	Italy	154
8	South Korea	155
5	India	157
4	Netherlands	155
19	Guatemala	153
6	Denmark	157
10	Mexico	156^{19}
2	Colombia	156^{19+}

Semifinals
8	South Korea	156
5	India	159
6	Denmark	155
2	Colombia	157

Final
5	India	150
2	Colombia	154
Third place
8	South Korea	152
6	Denmark	148
