= 2021 World Archery Championships – Men's individual recurve =

Archery competition

The men's individual recurve competition at the 2021 World Archery Championships took place from 21 to 26 September in Yankton, United States.

== Schedule ==
All times are Central Daylight Time (UTC−05:00).

Date	Time	Round
Tuesday, 21 September	09:00	Qualification round
Thursday, 23 September	14:00; 16:00; 16:45; 17:25	1/48 finals 1/24 finals 1/16 finals 1/8 finals
Sunday, 26 September	14:02; 14:50; 15:19; 15:31	Quarterfinals; Semifinals; Bronze medal match Final

== Qualification round ==
Results after 72 arrows.

Rank	Name	Nation	Score	10+X	X
1	Kim Woo-jin	South Korea	677	38	15
2	Marcus D'Almeida	Brazil	670	31	9
3	Brady Ellison	United States	659	30	11
4	Wei Chun-heng	Chinese Taipei	656	29	12
5	Miguel Alvariño Garcia	Spain	655	26	5
6	Kim Je-deok	South Korea	653	28	11
7	Oh Jin-hyek	South Korea	653	23	5
8	Thomas Chirault	France	653	22	10
9	Dashnamjil Dorjsuren	Mongolia	652	24	10
10	Pablo Acha	Spain	651	27	7
11	Mauro Nespoli	Italy	651	23	5
12	Antti Vikström	Finland	649	22	6
13	Patrick Huston	United Kingdom	648	27	5
14	Alessandro Paoli	Italy	648	20	7
15	Ricardo Soto	Chile	647	24	4
16	Takaharu Furukawa	Japan	647	23	5
17	Jack Williams	United States	647	22	8
18	Steve Wijler	Netherlands	647	20	7
19	Gijs Broeksma	Netherlands	646	25	6
20	Clément Jacquey	France	646	21	11
21	Andreas Gstöttner	Austria	646	19	7
22	Nicholas D'Amour	United States Virgin Islands	645	16	2
23	Jeff Henckels	Luxembourg	644	25	9
24	Galsan Bazarzhapov	Russian Archery Federation	644	22	6
25	Beligto Tsynguev	Russian Archery Federation	643	24	9
26	Andrés Aguilar	Chile	643	22	9
27	Ram Krishna Saha	Bangladesh	642	22	3
28	Ivan Kozhokar	Ukraine	642	22	1
29	Mete Gazoz	Turkey	642	17	8
30	Žiga Ravnikar	Slovenia	641	25	8
31	Matthew Nofel	United States	641	24	9
32	James Woodgate	United Kingdom	641	22	6
33	Yu Guan-lin	Chinese Taipei	641	22	4
34	Dan Olaru	Moldova	640	18	7
35	Erdem Tsydypov	Russian Archery Federation	640	15	6
36	Florian Unruh	Germany	639	24	13
37	Tom Hall	United Kingdom	639	20	5
38	Luis Álvarez	Mexico	639	15	1
39	Wataru Oonuki	Japan	638	23	10
40	Marcelo Costa	Brazil	638	22	8
41	Heorhiy Ivanytskyy	Ukraine	638	20	6
42	Samet Ak	Turkey	638	19	3
43	Jorge Enríquez	Colombia	638	17	2
44	Oleksii Hunbin	Ukraine	637	16	3
45	Parth Salunkhe	India	636	23	7
46	Md Ruman Shana	Bangladesh	636	17	5
47	Jarno De Smedt	Belgium	635	21	7
48	Lou Thirion	France	634	17	3
49	Santiago Arcila	Colombia	633	22	7
50	Mohammad Hakim Ahmed Rubel	Bangladesh	633	15	4
51	Juraj Duchoň	Slovakia	633	14	5
52	Nuno Carneiro	Portugal	632	19	12
53	Aditya Choudhary	India	632	16	5
54	Yoshito Kuwae	Japan	631	21	7
55	Hung Cheng-hao	Chinese Taipei	631	18	6
56	Atul Verma	India	630	19	4
57	Anton Tsiareta	Belarus	630	18	6
58	Felix Wieser	Germany	629	19	4
59	Kacper Sierakowski	Poland	629	13	5
60	Gantugs Jantsan	Mongolia	628	19	7
61	Adrián Muñoz	Puerto Rico	628	19	6
62	Carlos Rojas	Mexico	628	18	6
63	Michal Hlahůlek	Czech Republic	627	23	7
64	Den Habjan Malavašič	Slovenia	627	17	5
65	Andrew Azores	Canada	627	14	2
66	Filip Łazowski	Poland	626	17	7
67	Federico Musolesi	Italy	626	16	6
68	Maximilian Weckmüller	Germany	626	14	9
69	Thomas Rufer	Switzerland	626	12	2
70	Luka Arnež	Slovenia	625	16	4
71	Tiago Matos	Portugal	624	16	3
72	Oskar Kasprowski	Poland	623	22	8
73	Eric Peters	Canada	623	15	2
74	Ángel Alvarado	Mexico	621	16	4
75	Alen Remar	Croatia	620	17	6
76	Mátyás László Balogh	Hungary	620	17	5
77	Daniel Castro	Spain	620	15	5
78	Brandon Xuereb	Canada	619	19	6
79	Pit Klein	Luxembourg	617	10	6
80	Kaj Sjöberg	Sweden	616	16	2
81	Musa Arzuman	Turkey	616	15	4
82	Senna Roos	Belgium	615	18	6
83	Ben Adriaensen	Belgium	615	18	5
84	Bernardo Oliveira	Brazil	613	15	3
85	Thomas Flossbach	Guatemala	613	13	1
86	Luís Gonçalves	Portugal	605	14	4
87	Antti Tekoniemi	Finland	605	14	2
88	Jonah Wilthagen	Netherlands	601	13	4
89	Marco López	Guatemala	601	12	5
90	Sajeev De Silva	Sri Lanka	596	6	2
91	Lovro Černi	Croatia	595	13	1
92	Mansour Alwi	Saudi Arabia	587	11	1
93	José López	Guatemala	575	11	2
94	Ludvig Njor Henriksen	Denmark	575	10	1
95	Karl Kivilo	Estonia	572	7	2
96	Christian Brendstrup Christensen	Denmark	564	9	3
97	Rasmus Brynning	Denmark	564	9	1
98	Josef Křesala	Czech Republic	557	9	3
99	Bruce Arnold	United States Virgin Islands	535	8	2
100	Rashed Alsubaie	Saudi Arabia	534	3	1
101	Narmandakh Enkhtur	Mongolia	525	7	3
102	Abdulrahman Almusa	Saudi Arabia	520	10	0

== Elimination round ==
=== Section 1 ===
1/48 finals
1	(South Korea) Kim Woo-jin
Bye
33	(Chinese Taipei) Yu Guan-lin	7	27	26	27	29
80	(Sweden) Kaj Sjöberg	1	27	24	26	27
81	(Turkey) Musa Arzuman	6	27	27	27	27
32	(United Kingdom) James Woodgate	2	28	25	26	26
17	(United States) Jack Williams	6	29	27	27
96	(Denmark) Christian Brendstrup Christensen	0	24	19	24
65	(Canada) Andrew Azores	0	27	22	26
48	(France) Lou Thirion	6	30	29	29
49	(Colombia) Santiago Arcila	6	28	26	25	24	28
64	(Slovenia) Den Habjan Malavašič	4	28	26	23	28	27
97	(Denmark) Rasmus Brynning	1	25	27	22	23
16	(Japan) Takaharu Furukawa	7	28	27	25	29

1/24 finals
1	(South Korea) Kim Woo-jin
Bye
33	(Chinese Taipei) Yu Guan-lin	6	28	28	24	29
81	(Turkey) Musa Arzuman	2	27	26	28	25
17	(United States) Jack Williams	6	30	27	29
48	(France) Lou Thirion	0	26	23	23
49	(Colombia) Santiago Arcila	2	26	29	28	26
16	(Japan) Takaharu Furukawa	6	30	29	28	29

1/16 finals
1	(South Korea) Kim Woo-jin	7	29	29	28	28	30
33	(Chinese Taipei) Yu Guan-lin	3	27	29	29	25	27
17	(United States) Jack Williams	6	30	29	27	30
16	(Japan) Takaharu Furukawa	2	27	27	29	26

1/8 finals
1	(South Korea) Kim Woo-jin	6	29	29	28	30	29
17	(United States) Jack Williams	4	30	28	29	29	28

=== Section 2 ===
1/48 finals
9	(Mongolia) Dashnamjil Dorjsuren
Bye
57	(Belarus) Anton Tsiareta	2	26	28	28	24
56	(India) Atul Verma	6	27	29	27	29
41	(Ukraine) Heorhiy Ivanytskyy	7	30	26	27	26	26
72	(Poland) Oskar Kasprowski	3	28	22	27	29	25
89	(Guatemala) Marco López	2	26	27	24	26
24	Galsan Bazarzhapov	6	26	27	27	28
25	Beligto Tsynguev	6	26	28	27	29	27
88	(Guatemala) Jonah Wilthagen	4	25	30	28	27	26
73	(Canada) Eric Peters	6	29	29	25	29
40	(Brazil) Marcelo Costa	2	26	25	27	25
Bye
8	(France) Thomas Chirault

1/24 finals
9	(Mongolia) Dashnamjil Dorjsuren	6	26	27	28	27	27
56	(India) Atul Verma	4	24	27	26	28	27
41	(Ukraine) Heorhiy Ivanytskyy	1	28	26	27	26
24	Galsan Bazarzhapov	7	29	28	27	28
25	Beligto Tsynguev	6	30	29	28
73	(Canada) E Peters	0	26	25	25
Bye
8	(France) Thomas Chirault

1/16 finals
9	(Mongolia) Dashnamjil Dorjsuren	4	28	29	25	26	23
24	Galsan Bazarzhapov	6	27	28	29	28	25
25	Beligto Tsynguev	4	28	29	28	28	27
8	(France) Thomas Chirault	6	26	29	30	28	29

1/8 finals
24	Galsan Bazarzhapov	7	28	29	29	28	30
8	(France) Thomas Chirault	3	27	29	26	29	27

=== Section 3 ===
1/48 finals
5	(Spain) Miguel Alvariño
Bye
37	(United Kingdom) Tom Hall	6	29	28	30
76	(Hungary) Mátyás Balogh	0	26	22	24
85	(Guatemala) Thomas Flossbach	4	26	28	29	27	22
28	(Ukraine) Ivan Kozhokar	6	27	27	26	28	26
21	(Austria) Andreas Gstöttner	7	29	25	29	26	28
92	(Saudi Arabia) Mansour Alwi	3	24	27	26	26	27
69	(Switzerland) Thomas Rufer	2	27	24	27	26
44	(Ukraine) Oleksii Hunbin	6	27	26	27	28
53	(India) Aditya Choudhary	6^{9+}	27	27	28	29	27
60	(Mongolia) Jantsangiin Gantögs	5^{9}	29	29	24	25	27
101	(Mongolia) Narmandakh Enkhtur	0	24	29	27
12	(Finland) Antti Vikström	6	28	30	28

1/24 finals
5	(Spain) Miguel Alvariño
Bye
37	(United Kingdom) Tom Hall	7	26	25	27	29	29
28	(Ukraine) Ivan Kozhokar	3	22	27	26	29	28
21	(Austria) Andreas Gstöttner	2	25	26	28	25
44	(Ukraine) Oleksii Hunbin	6	27	29	27	27
53	(India) Aditya Choudhary	7	28	27	29	28
12	(Finland) Antti Vikström	1	26	27	27	24

1/16 finals
5	(Spain) Miguel Alvariño	6	29	29	29	28
37	(United Kingdom) Tom Hall	2	30	26	28	27
44	(Ukraine) Oleksii Hunbin	0	28	26	27
53	(India) Aditya Choudhary	6	29	27	30

1/8 finals
5	(Spain) Miguel Alvariño	6	30	27	29
53	(India) Aditya Choudhary	0	28	26	27

=== Section 4 ===
1/48 finals
13	(United Kingdom) Patrick Huston	7	27	28	29	26
100	(Saudi Arabia) Rashed Alsubaie	1	23	28	27	25
61	(Puerto Rico) Adrián Muñoz	6	27	28	26	28
52	(Portugal) Nuno Carneiro	2	26	28	26	27
45	(India) Parth Sushant Salunkhe	5^{8}	28	27	29	29	28
68	(Germany) Maximilian Weckmüller	6^{10}	27	29	29	29	28
93	(Guatemala) José López	0	22	24	23
20	(France) Clément Jacquey	6	29	30	29
29	(Turkey) Mete Gazoz	6	25	29	29	29
84	(Brazil) Bernardo Oliveira	2	28	24	25	26
77	(Spain) Daniel Castro	2	27	30	26	28
36	(Germany) Florian Kahllund	6	28	29	28	30
Bye
4	(Chinese Taipei) Wei Chun-heng

1/24 finals
13	(United Kingdom) Patrick Huston	6^{10}	27	27	26	28	26
61	(Puerto Rico) Adrián Muñoz	5^{7}	28	27	24	25	29
68	(Germany) Maximilian Weckmüller	6	29	27	25	28
20	(France) Clément Jacquey	2	28	26	25	28
29	(Turkey) Mete Gazoz	7	29	29	29	27	29
36	(Germany) Florian Kahllund	3	30	27	29	22	27
Bye
4	(Chinese Taipei) Wei Chun-heng

1/16 finals
13	(United Kingdom) Patrick Huston	6	28	29	28	28	27
58	(Germany) Maximilian Weckmüller	4	29	28	27	28	27
29	(Turkey) Mete Gazoz	7	30	28	27	28	30
4	(Chinese Taipei) Wei Chun-heng	3	29	28	29	25	28

1/8 finals
13	(United Kingdom) Patrick Huston	2	20	28	27	29
29	(Turkey) Mete Gazoz	6	29	27	28	30

=== Section 5 ===
1/48 finals
3	(United States) Brady Ellison
Bye
35	Erdem Tsydypov	7	25	27	27	28	27
78	(Canada) Brandon Xuereb	3	25	26	29	26	26
83	(Belgium) Ben Adriaensen	6	29	25	28	29
30	(Slovenia) Žiga Ravnikar	2	27	26	25	26
19	(Netherlands) Gijs Broeksma	6	28	28	27	29
94	(Denmark) Ludvig Njor Henriksen	2	25	27	28	24
67	(Italy) Federico Musolesi	6	27	28	29
46	(Bangladesh) Ruman Shana	0	25	26	26
51	(Slovakia) Juraj Duchoň	6^{10}	26	23	27	24	23
62	(Mexico) Carlos Rojas	5^{8}	26	22	26	27	25
99	(United States Virgin Islands) Bruce Arnold	0	27	23	24
14	(Italy) Alessandro Paoli	6	28	25	25

1/24 finals
3	(United States) Brady Ellison
Bye
35	Erdem Tsydypov	6	30	27	29
83	(Belgium) Ben Adriaensen	0	25	23	25
19	(Netherlands) Gijs Broeksma	2	26	27	23	29
67	(Italy) Federico Musolesi	6	26	29	29	29
51	(Slovakia) Juraj Duchoň	4	27	27	29	28	28
14	(Italy) Alessandro Paoli	6	28	29	27	27	29

1/16 finals
3	(United States) Brady Ellison	6	27	30	30	30
35	Erdem Tsydypov	2	28	27	26	28
67	(Italy) Federico Musolesi	2	27	26	29	29
14	(Italy) Alessandro Paoli	6	30	28	29	29

1/8 finals
3	(United States) Brady Ellison	6	28	27	26	30	29
14	(Italy) Alessandro Paoli	4	27	29	29	29	28

=== Section 6 ===
1/48 finals
11	(Italy) Mauro Nespoli	6	26	29	28	27
102	(Saudi Arabia) Abdulrahman Almusa	2	27	23	21	21
59	(Poland) Kacper Sierakowski	2	27	25	27	26
54	(Japan) Yoshito Kuwae	6	29	29	26	29
43	(Colombia) Jorge Enríquez	5^{8}	27	26	28	23	27
70	(Slovenia) Luka Arnež	6^{X}	26	26	25	26	30
91	(Croatia) Lovro Černi	2	29	27	27	28
22	(United States Virgin Islands) Nicholas D'Amour	6	29	28	28	28
27	(Bangladesh) Ram Krishna Saha	6	27	26	27	25
86	(Portugal) Luís Gonçalves	2	28	24	24	24
75	(Croatia) Alen Remar	3	24	25	27	27	25
38	(Mexico) Luis Álvarez	7	26	26	23	27	29
Bye
6	(South Korea) Kim Je-deok

1/24 finals
11	(Italy) Mauro Nespoli	0	26	28	26
54	(Japan) Yoshito Kuwae	6	30	29	28
70	(Slovenia) Luka Arnež	6^{9}	29	26	24	26	28
22	(United States Virgin Islands) Nicholas D'Amour	5^{8}	27	26	27	29	25
27	(Bangladesh) Ram Krishna Saha	4	25	27	28	28	27
38	(Mexico) Luis Álvarez	6	27	26	29	27	28
Bye
6	(South Korea) Kim Je-deok

1/16 finals
54	(Japan) Yoshito Kuwae	7	28	26	27	28
70	(Slovenia) Luka Arnež	1	27	25	27	26
38	(Mexico) Luis Álvarez	2	26	28	28	28
6	(South Korea) Kim Je-deok	6	28	28	28	29

1/8 finals
54	(Japan) Yoshito Kuwae	0	27	28	24
6	(South Korea) Kim Je-deok	6	29	30	27

=== Section 7 ===
1/48 finals
7	(South Korea) Oh Jin-hyek
Bye
39	(Japan) Wataru Oonuki	4	26	23	25	26	26
74	(Mexico) Ángel Alvarado	6	25	27	24	30	28
87	(Finland) Antti Tekoniemi	6	25	28	27	26	28
26	(Chile) Andrés Aguilar	4	27	27	26	27	27
23	(Luxembourg) Jeff Henckels	4	29	26	28	28	27
90	(Sri Lanka) Sajeev De Silva	6	26	27	28	29	27
71	(Portugal) Tiago Matos	0	24	25	27
42	(Turkey) Samet Ak	6	28	28	29
55	(Chinese Taipei) Hung Cheng-hao	6	28	28	29	29
58	(Germany) Felix Wieser	2	28	27	29	28
Bye
10	(Spain) Pablo Acha

1/24 finals
7	(South Korea) Oh Jin-hyek
Bye
74	(Mexico) Ángel Alvarado	6	27	23	28	25	28
87	(Finland) Antti Tekoniemi	4	26	25	24	27	24
90	(Sri Lanka) Sajeev De Silva	2	27	27	25	26
42	(Turkey) Samet Ak	6	28	23	27	28
55	(Chinese Taipei) Hung Cheng-hao	4	28	27	23	25	26
10	(Spain) Pablo Acha	6	27	25	28	26	27

1/16 finals
7	(South Korea) Oh Jin-hyek	7	30	29	30	29
74	(Mexico) Ángel Alvarado	1	28	29	28	27
42	(Turkey) Samet Ak	6	27	27	24	27	29
10	(Spain) Pablo Acha	5	27	26	25	29	28

1/8 finals
7	(South Korea) Oh Jin-hyek	4	28	28	29	28	26
42	(Turkey) Samet Ak	6	28	28	26	30	27

=== Section 8 ===
1/48 finals
15	(Chile) Ricardo Soto	6	29	26	29
98	(Czech Republic) Josef Křesala	0	28	25	25
63	(Czech Republic) Michal Hlahůlek	4	27	28	29	26	24
50	(Bangladesh) Mohammad Hakim Ahmed Rubel	6	27	27	29	27	28
47	(Belgium) Jarno De Smedt	6	27	29	26
66	(Poland) Filip Łazowski	0	25	26	25
95	(Estonia) Karl Kivilo	2	26	21	29	27
15	(Netherlands) Steve Wijler	6	28	27	28	29
31	(United States) Matthew Nofel	1	29	26	19	26
82	(Belgium) Senna Roos	7	29	28	28	28
79	(Luxembourg) Pit Klein	5^{7}	28	29	29	27	26
34	(Moldova) Dan Olaru	6^{10}	26	28	29	28	27
Bye
2	(Brazil) Marcus D'Almeida

1/24 finals
15	(Chile) Ricardo Soto	3	27	27	28	27	28
50	(Bangladesh) Mohammad Hakim Ahmed Rubel	7	29	28	27	27	29
47	(Belgium) Jarno De Smedt	5^{9}	28	30	26	28	30
15	(Netherlands) Steve Wijler	6^{10}	29	27	28	28	28
82	(Belgium) Senna Roos	3	29	28	27	29	25
34	(Moldova) Dan Olaru	7	29	29	29	28	29
Bye
2	(Brazil) Marcus D'Almeida

1/16 finals
50	(Bangladesh) Mohammad Hakim Ahmed Rubel	4	27	28	28	28	25
15	(Netherlands) Steve Wijler	6	28	29	28	26	25
34	(Moldova) Dan Olaru	3	28	27	22	30	27
2	(Brazil) Marcus D'Almeida	7	26	28	30	30	29

1/8 finals
15	(Netherlands) Steve Wijler	3	28	28	28	26	28
2	(Brazil) Marcus D'Almeida	7	29	28	26	28	29

== Final round ==
Quarterfinals
1	(South Korea) Kim Woo-jin	6	29	28	29	27
24	Galsan Bazarzhapov	2	26	28	26	27
5	(Spain) Miguel Alvariño	1	26	25	29	28
29	(Turkey) Mete Gazoz	7	28	28	29	29
3	(United States) Brady Ellison	6	28	29	28
6	(South Korea) Kim Je-deok	0	27	28	26
42	(Turkey) Samet Ak	0	28	28	26
2	(Brazil) Marcus D'Almeida	6	29	30	27

Semifinals
1	(South Korea) Kim Woo-jin	6	30	27	29	29	29
29	(Turkey) Mete Gazoz	4	27	30	28	29	29
3	(United States) Brady Ellison	4	28	30	29	25	27
2	(Brazil) Marcus D'Almeida	6	28	30	25	29	28

Finals
1	(South Korea) Kim Woo-jin	7	29	29	27	28	29
2	(Brazil) Marcus D'Almeida	3	26	28	30	28	27
Third place
29	(Turkey) Mete Gazoz	2	29	28	28	29
3	(United States) Brady Ellison	6	30	28	29	29
