= Tanja Gellenthien =

Danish archer (born 1995)

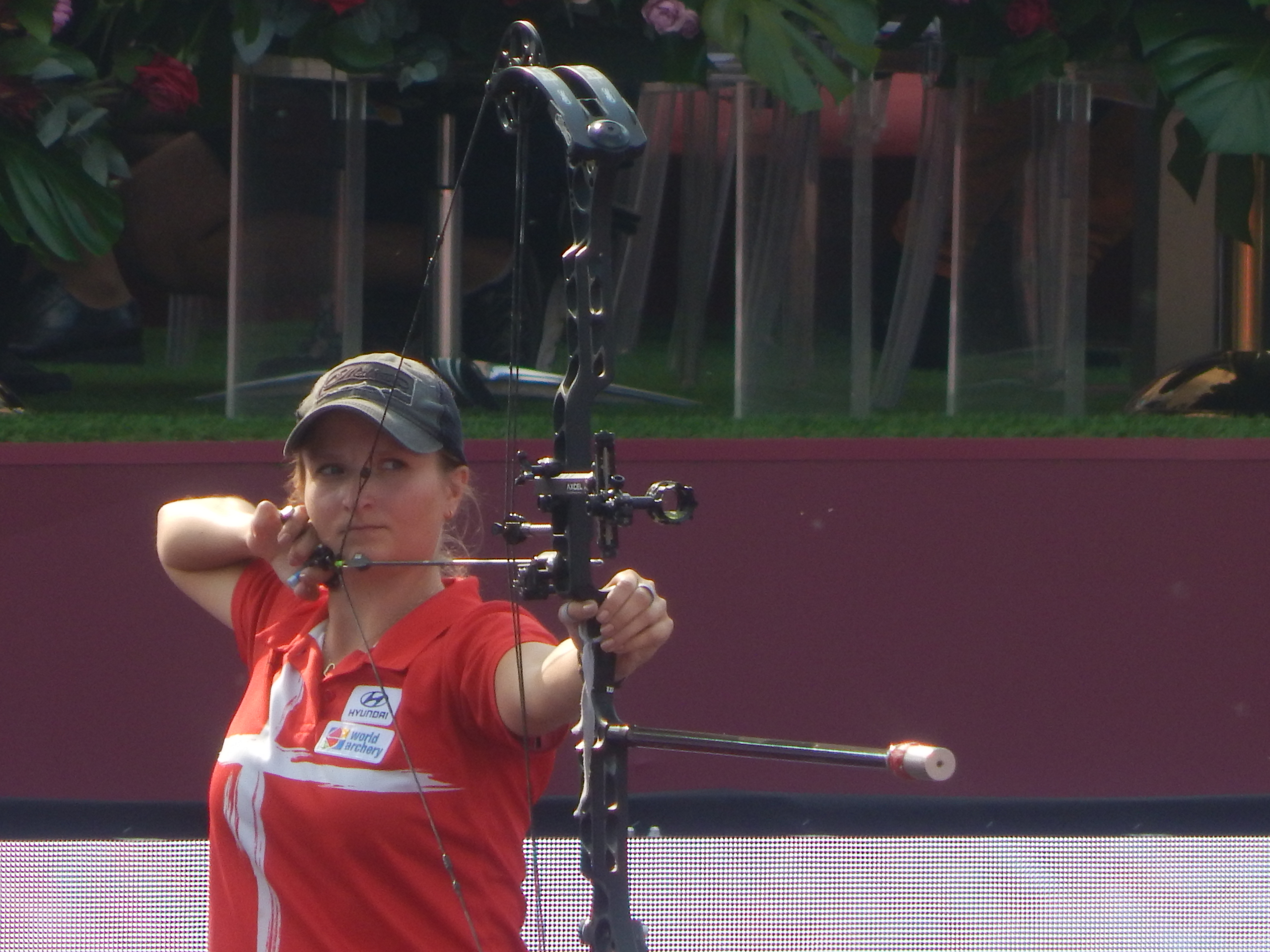
- Tanja Jensen in 2019

Personal information
- Born: Tanja Jensen; 21 July 1995 (age 30)

Sport
- Country: Denmark
- Sport: Archery
Medal record
Women's compound archery
Representing Denmark
European Games
Silver medal – second place	2023 Kraków-Małopolska	Mixed team
European Championships
Silver medal – second place	2026 Antalya	Individual
Bronze medal – third place	2026 Antalya	Mixed team

Tanja Gellenthien (née Jensen; born 21 July 1995) is a Danish archer who competes in women's compound events. She won the gold medal in the women's individual compound event at the 2021 European Archery Championships in Antalya, Turkey.

Gellenthien and Stephan Hansen won the gold medal in the mixed team compound event at the 2022 European Archery Championships held in Munich, Germany.

She represented Denmark at the 2022 World Games held in Birmingham, United States.

In 2023, she won the women's championship title in the compound division of The Vegas Shoot, a prominent target competition organized by the National Field Archery Association after finishing second in the same event in 2022.

Gellenthien and Mathias Fullerton won the silver medal in the mixed team compound event at the 2023 European Games held in Poland. She lost her bronze medal match in the women's individual compound event.

She is married to American archer Braden Gellenthien.
