= 2021 World Archery Championships – Men's team recurve =

Archery competition

The men's team recurve competition at the 2021 World Archery Championships took place from 21 to 24 September in Yankton, United States.

== Schedule ==
All times are Central Daylight Time (UTC−05:00).

Date	Time	Round
Tuesday, 21 September	09:00	Qualification round
Wednesday, 22 September	14:00; 14:45; 15:15; 15:45	1/12 finals 1/8 finals Quarterfinals; Semifinals
Friday, 24 September	11:06; 11:32	Bronze medal match Final

== Qualification round ==
Results after 216 arrows.

Rank	Nation	Name	Score	10+X	X
1	South Korea	Kim Woo-jin; Kim Je-deok; Oh Jin-hyek	1983	89	31
2	United States	Brady Ellison; Matthew Nofel; Jack Williams	1947	76	28
3	France	Thomas Chirault; Clément Jacquey; Lou Thirion	1933	60	24
4	Chinese Taipei	Hung Cheng-hao; Wei Chun-heng; Yu Guan-lin	1928	69	22
5	United Kingdom	Tom Hall; Patrick Huston; James Woodgate	1928	69	16
6	Russian Archery Federation	Galsan Bazarzhapov; Erdem Tsydypov; Beligto Tsynguev	1927	61	21
7	Spain	Pablo Acha; Miguel Alvariño Garcia; Daniel Castro	1926	68	17
8	Italy	Federico Musolesi; Mauro Nespoli; Alessandro Paoli	1925	59	18
9	Brazil	Marcelo Costa; Marcus D'Almeida; Bernardo Oliveira	1921	68	20
10	Ukraine	Oleksii Hunbin; Heorhiy Ivanytskyy; Ivan Kozhokar	1917	58	10
11	Japan	Takaharu Furukawa; Yoshito Kuwae; Wataru Oonuki	1916	67	22
12	Bangladesh	Mohammad Hakim Ahmed Rubel; Ram Krishna Saha; Md Ruman Shana	1911	54	12
13	India	Aditya Choudhary; Parth Salunkhe; Atul Verma	1898	58	16
14	Turkey	Samet Ak; Musa Arzuman; Mete Gazoz	1896	51	15
15	Netherlands	Gijs Broeksma; Steve Wijler; Jonah Wilthagen	1894	58	17
16	Germany	Florian Unruh; Maximilian Weckmüller; Felix Wieser	1894	57	26
17	Slovenia	Luka Arnež; Den Habjan Malavašič; Žiga Ravnikar	1893	58	17
18	Mexico	Ángel Alvarado; Luis Álvarez; Carlos Rojas	1888	49	11
19	Poland	Oskar Kasprowski; Filip Łazowski; Kacper Sierakowski	1878	52	20
20	Canada	Andrew Azores; Eric Peters; Brandon Xuereb	1869	48	10
21	Belgium	Ben Adriaensen; Jarno De Smedt; Senna Roos	1865	57	18
22	Portugal	Nuno Carneiro; Luís Gonçalves; Tiago Matos	1861	49	19
23	Mongolia	Dashnamjil Dorjsuren; Narmandakh Enkhtur; Gantugs Jantsan	1805	50	20
24	Guatemala	Thomas Flossbach; Marco López; José López	1789	36	8
25	Denmark	Rasmus Brynning; Christian Brendstrup Christensen; Ludvig Njor Henriksen	1703	28	5
26	Saudi Arabia	Abdulrahman Almusa; Rashed Alsubaie; Mansour Alwi	1641	24	2

== Elimination round ==
=== Section 1 ===
1/12 finals
1	South Korea
Bye
17	Slovenia	0	54	53	56
16	Germany	6	59	54	56
9	Brazil	6	54	54	55
24	Guatemala	0	53	52	49
Bye
8	Italy
5	United Kingdom
Bye
21	Belgium	5	55	50	58	54
12	Bangladesh	3	55	57	53	53
13	India	5	50	51	54	56	28
20	Canada	4	55	54	52	50	24
Bye
4	Chinese Taipei

1/8 finals
1	South Korea	5	57	58	59	57
16	Germany	3	55	59	56	57
9	Brazil	5	54	56	56	51	28
8	Italy	4	53	54	58	58	25
5	United Kingdom	5	56	56	53	57
21	Belgium	3	55	56	56	54
13	India	3	54	56	57	57
4	Chinese Taipei	5	56	56	56	58

Quarterfinals
1	South Korea	6	57	57	58
9	Brazil	0	51	56	52
5	United Kingdom	4	55	52	50	57	28
4	Chinese Taipei	5	54	53	59	53	29

Semifinals
1	South Korea	6	53	57	56	57
4	Chinese Taipei	2	57	52	51	56

=== Section 2 ===
1/12 finals
3	France
Bye
19	Poland	4	57	54	56	54	26
14	Turkey	5	55	56	55	55	26+
11	Japan	5	57	55	55
22	Portugal	1	50	55	55
Bye
6	RAF
7	Spain
Bye
23	Mongolia	4	51	50	53	55	26
10	Ukraine	5	51	51	53	54	26+
15	Netherlands	1	56	50	55
18	Mexico	5	56	51	57
Bye
2	United States

1/8 finals
3	France	5	52	52	57	57	25
14	Turkey	4	54	51	52	58	21
11	Japan	5	55	55	53	55
6	RAF	3	55	51	55	52
7	Spain	6	57	55	54
10	Ukraine	0	54	51	53
18	Mexico	0	52	54	54
2	United States	6	56	56	56

Quarterfinals
3	France	2	56	55	51	52
11	Japan	6	55	56	57	56
7	Spain	4	55	53	56	57	27
2	United States	5	57	57	55	55	30

Semifinals
11	Japan	4	55	53	57	56	26
2	United States	5	55	56	56	56	26+

== Final round ==
Semifinals
1	South Korea	6	53	57	56	57
4	Chinese Taipei	2	57	52	51	56
11	Japan	4	55	53	57	56	26
2	United States	5	55	56	56	56	26+

Finals
1	South Korea	6	54	56	57
2	United States	0	53	55	54
Third place
4	Chinese Taipei	5	55	52	56	58	29
11	Japan	4	57	52	56	57	27
