= 2021 World Archery Championships =

2021 World Championships
- Location: Yankton, United States
- Dates: 20 to 26 September
- Competitors: 344 from 55 nations

The 2021 World Archery Championships was held from 20 to 26 September 2021 in Yankton, United States.

== Medals table ==
* Host nation (United States)

Rank	Nation	Gold	Silver	Bronze	Total
1	South Korea	5	0	2	7
2	Colombia	3	0	0	3
3	United States*	1	2	2	5
4	Austria	1	0	1	2
5	India	0	3	0	3
6	Mexico	0	2	1	3
7	Brazil	0	1	0	1
7	Netherlands	0	1	0	1
7	Russian Archery Federation	0	1	0	1
10	Chinese Taipei	0	0	1	1
10	Estonia	0	0	1	1
10	France	0	0	1	1
10	Turkey	0	0	1	1
Totals (13 entries)		10	10	10	30

== Medals summary ==
=== Recurve ===
Event	Gold	Silver	Bronze
Men's individual	Kim Woo-jin; South Korea	Marcus Vinicius D'Almeida; Brazil	Brady Ellison; United States
Women's individual	Jang Min-hee; South Korea	Casey Kaufhold; United States	An San; South Korea
Men's team	South Korea; Kim Woo-jin; Kim Je-deok; Oh Jin-hyek	United States; Brady Ellison; Matthew Nofel; Jack Williams	Chinese Taipei; Hung Cheng-hao; Wei Chun-heng; Yu Guan-lin
Women's team	South Korea; An San; Jang Min-hee; Kang Chae-young	Mexico; Aída Román; Alejandra Valencia; Ana Vázquez	France; Lisa Barbelin; Caroline Lopez; Mélodie Richard
Mixed team	South Korea; An San; Kim Woo-jin	Russian Archery Federation; Elena Osipova; Galsan Bazarzhapov	Turkey; Yasemin Anagöz; Mete Gazoz

=== Compound ===
Event	Gold	Silver	Bronze
Men's individual	Nico Wiener; Austria	Mike Schloesser; Netherlands	Robin Jäätma; Estonia
Women's individual	Sara López; Colombia	Jyothi Surekha Vennam; India	Andrea Becerra; Mexico
Men's team	United States; Braden Gellenthien; James Lutz; Kris Schaff	Mexico; Miguel Becerra; Antonio Hidalgo; Uriel Olvera	Austria; Stefan Heincz; Michael Matzner; Nico Wiener
Women's team	Colombia; Sara López; Alejandra Usquiano; Nora Valdez	India; Priya Gurjar; Muskan Kirar; Jyothi Surekha Vennam	United States; Linda Ochoa-Anderson; Paige Pearce; Makenna Proctor
Mixed team	Colombia; Sara López; Daniel Muñoz	India; Jyothi Surekha Vennam; Abhishek Verma	South Korea; Kim Yun-hee; Kim Jong-ho
