= Archery at the 2019 Summer Universiade – Men's team compound =

Men's team compound at the XXX Summer Universiade
- Venues: Partenio Stadium, Royal Palace
- Dates: July 8, 2019 – July 13, 2019
- Competitors: 32 from 16 nations

Medalists
1st place, gold medalist(s)		Suleyman Araz; Muhammed Yetim	Turkey
2nd place, silver medalist(s)		Kiarash Farzan; Mohammadsaleh Palizban	Iran
3rd place, bronze medalist(s)		Miguel Becerra Rivas; Rodolfo Gonzalez de Alba	Mexico

The men's team compound archery competition at the 2019 Summer Universiade was held in the Partenio Stadium, Avellino, Italy and the Royal Palace in Caserta, Italy between July 8 and 13.

== Qualification round ==
Rank	Team	Archer	Individual	Team	Notes
Rank	Team	Archer	Score	Total	Notes
1	Mexico	Miguel Becerra Rivas	703	1410	
1	Mexico	Rodolfo Gonzalez de Alba	707	1410	
2	Turkey	Suleyman Araz	704	1408	
2	Turkey	Muhammed Yetim	704	1408	
3	South Korea	Jongho Kim	716	1402	
3	South Korea	Jeongmin Kim	686	1402	
4	Iran	Kiarash Farzan	695	1401	
4	Iran	Mohammadsaleh Palizban	706	1401	
5	Chinese Taipei	Chieh-Lun Chen	701	1392	T. 101;37
5	Chinese Taipei	Hsiang-Hsuan Chen	691	1392	T. 101;37
6	United States	Denver Douglas Gross	693	1392	T. 97;43
6	United States	Josh Barry Isenhoff	699	1392	T. 97;43
7	India	Sangampreet Singh Bisla	690	1389	
7	India	Rajat Chauhan	699	1389	
8	Italy	Alex Boggiatto	697	1387	
8	Italy	Viviano Mior	690	1387	
9	France	Yann Damour	691	1386	T. 94;39
9	France	Camille Dufour	695	1386	T. 94;39
10	Great Britain	Stuart Jonathon Taylor	688	1386	T. 93;27
10	Great Britain	Kai Leon Thomas-Prause	698	1386	T. 93;27
11	Russia	Anton Bulaev	695	1385	
11	Russia	Asim Pavlov	690	1385	
12	Indonesia	Yoke Rizaldi Akbar	695	1381	
12	Indonesia	Prima Wins Wardhana	686	1381	
13	Malaysia	Amirul Amin Abd Rahim	682	1365	
13	Malaysia	Muhammad Fahur Rosi Choiril Anuar	683	1365	
14	Kazakhstan	Vladimir Sorokin	680	1348	
14	Kazakhstan	Ansar Yagudiyev	668	1348	
15	Ukraine	Bohdan Kishchak	665	1347	
15	Ukraine	Oleg Piven	682	1347	
16	Singapore	Jun Hui Goh	683	1329	
16	Singapore	Jia Wei Aden Neo	646	1329	

== Elimination rounds ==
Round of 16
1	Mexico	153
16	Singapore	141
9	France	154
8	Italy	150
5	Chinese Taipei	151
12	Indonesia	152
13	Malaysia	144
4	Iran	152
3	South Korea	158
14	Kazakhstan	144
11	Russia	147
6	United States	150
7	India	153
10	Great Britain	147
15	Ukraine	146
2	Turkey	150

Quarterfinals
1	Mexico	151 T.20
9	France	151 T.19
12	Indonesia	150
4	Iran	153
3	South Korea	151
6	United States	152
7	India	147
2	Turkey	152

Semifinals
1	Mexico	153
4	Iran	155
6	United States	153
2	Turkey	157

Final
4	Iran	156 T.19
2	Turkey	156 T.19*
Third place
1	Mexico	158
6	United States	150
