= Archery at the 2019 Summer Universiade – Men's individual compound =

Sporting event in Italy

Men's individual compound at the XXX Summer Universiade
- Venues: Partenio Stadium, Royal Palace
- Dates: July 8, 2019 – July 13, 2019
- Competitors: 46 from 30 nations

Medalists
1st place, gold medalist(s)		Anton Bulaev	Russia
2nd place, silver medalist(s)		Muhammed Yetim	Turkey
3rd place, bronze medalist(s)		Kim Jong-ho	South Korea

The men's individual compound archery competition at the 2019 Summer Universiade was held in the Partenio Stadium, Avellino, Italy and the Royal Palace in Caserta, Italy between July 8 and 13.

== Records ==
Prior to the competition, the world and Universiade records were as follows.

- 50 metres Round

Category	Athlete	Record	Date	Place	Event
World record	(United States) Braden Gellenthien	718	13 July 2016	Decatur, USA	2016 USA Archery Outdoor Nationals
Universiade record	(South Korea) Kim Jong-ho	705	04 July 2015	Gwangju, South Korea	2015 Summer Universiade

- 15 arrow Match

Category	Athlete	Record	Date	Place	Event
World record	(United States) Reo Wilde	150	07 May 2015	Shanghai, China	2015 Archery World Cup
Universiade record	(South Korea) Kim Jong-ho	149	05 July 2015	Gwangju, South Korea	2015 Summer Universiade

== Qualification round ==
Qualified for Round of 32
Qualified for 1/24 Round

The qualification round took place on 9 July 2019 to determine the seeding for the elimination rounds. It consisted of two rounds of 36 arrows, with a maximum score of 720.

Rank	Archer	1st Half	2nd Half	10s	Xs	Score	Notes
1	Jongho Kim (KOR)	357	359	68	38	716	UR
2	Rodolfo Gonzalez De Alba (MEX)	352	355	60	48	707	
3	Mohammadsaleh Palizban (IRI)	350	356	58	27	706	
4	Suleyman Araz (TUR)	352	352	57	21	704	
5	Muhammed Yetim (TUR)	353	351	56	22	704	
6	Miguel Becerra Rivas (MEX)	349	354	57	34	703	
7	Viktor Orosz (HUN)	349	354	55	21	703	
8	Chieh-Lun Chen (TPE)	349	352	54	25	701	T.9*
9	Christian Beyers De Klerk (RSA)	352	349	53	24	701	T.9
10	Rajat Chauhan (IND)	346	353	52	22	699	
11	Josh Barry Isenhoff (USA)	350	349	51	24	699	
12	Kai Leon Thomas-Prause (GBR)	346	352	50	15	698	
13	Alex Boggiatto (ITA)	349	348	50	26	697	
14	Remy Leonard (AUS)	348	349	50	22	697	
15	Robin Jaatma (EST)	347	349	49	22	696	
16	Yoke Rizaldi Akbar (INA)	345	350	51	23	695	
17	Camille Dufour (FRA)	347	348	51	18	695	
18	Lukasz Przybylski (POL)	345	350	47	20	695	
19	Anton Bulaev (RUS)	345	350	47	19	695	
20	Kiarash Frazan (IRI)	348	347	47	17	695	
21	Denver Douglas Gross (USA)	348	345	46	19	693	
22	Hsiang-Hsuan Chen (TPE)	343	348	47	12	691	
23	Yann Damour (FRA)	343	348	43	21	691	
24	Sangampreet Singh Bisla (IND)	342	348	47	21	690	
25	Asim Pavlov (RUS)	341	349	44	20	690	
26	Viviano Mior (ITA)	344	346	44	16	690	
27	Stas Modic (SLO)	343	345	46	19	688	
28	Stuart Jonathon Taylor (GBR)	344	344	43	12	688	
29	Paul Leon Hollas (GER)	344	343	41	15	687	
30	Jeongmin Kim (KOR)	340	346	43	13	686	
31	Prima Wisnu Wardhana (INA)	346	340	42	21	686	
32	Chun Kit Tsui (HKG)	340	344	42	13	684	
33	Muhammad Fahrur Rosins Choiril Anuar (MAS)	341	342	41	14	683	
34	Jun Hui Goh (SGP)	341	342	38	14	683	
35	Mnirul Amin And Rahim (MAS)	340	342	42	19	682	
36	Oleg Piven (UKR)	345	337	40	19	682	
37	Ryosuke Kishi (JPN)	338	343	36	14	681	
38	Vladimir Sorokin (KAZ)	343	337	38	19	680	
39	Samuel Hudson (NZL)	336	344	36	18	680	
40	Javier Cerezo Bernet (ESP)	343	336	39	17	679	
41	Isak Carlsson (SWE)	334	345	36	12	679	
42	Daniel Floey (IRL)	336	341	32	12	677	
43	Ansar Yagudiyev (KAZ)	332	336	36	22	668	
44	Bohdan Kishchak (UKR)	325	340	31	11	665	
45	Nurmammet Nuryyev (TKM)	335	311	27	13	646	
46	Jia Wei Aden Neo (SGP)	323	323	20	9	646	

== Elimination rounds ==
=== Section 1 ===
Round of 64
33	Muhammad Fahrur Rosi Choiril Anuar (MAS)	141 (T9)
32	Chun Kit Tsui (HKG)	141 (T10)
41	Isak Carlsson (SWE)	140
24	Sangampreet Singh Bisla (IND)	142
25	Asim Pavlov (RUS)	141
40	Javier Cerezo Bernet (ESP)	138

Round of 32
1	Johgho Kim (KOR)	148
32	Chun Kit Tsui (HKG)	142
17	Camille Dufour (FRA)	143 (TX)
16	Yoke Rizaldi Akbar (INA)	143 (T10)
9	Christian Beyers De Klerk (RSA)	148
24	Sangampreet Singh Bisla (IND)	143
25	Asim Pavlov (RUS)	143
8	Chieh-Lun Chen (TPE)	148

Round of 16
1	Jongho Kim (KOR)	144 (T9)
17	Camille Dufour (FRA)	144 (T9)
9	Christian Beyers De Klerk (RSA)	145
8	Chieh-Lun Chen (TPE)	144

Quarterfinal
1	Jongho Kim (KOR)	150
9	Christian Beyers De Klerk (RSA)	144

=== Section 2 ===
Round of 64
37	Ryosuke Kishi (JPN)	139
28	Suart Jonathon Taylor (GBR)	143
21	Denver Douglas Gross (USA)	144
44	Bohdan Kishchak (UKR)	139
45	Nurmammet Nuryyev (TKM)	125
20	Kiarash Farzan (IRI)	141
29	Paul Leon Hollas (GER)	142
36	Oleg Piven (UKR)	138

Round of 32
5	Muhammed Yetim (TUR)	146
28	Stuart Jonathon Taylor (GBR)	139
21	Denver Douglas Gross (FRA)	144
12	Kai Leon Thomas-Prause (GBR)	135
13	Alex Boggiatto (RSA)	143
20	Kiarash Farzan (IRI)	145
29	Paul Leon Hollas (GER)	141
4	Suleyman Araz (TUR)	146

Round of 16
5	Muhammed Yetim (TUR)	148
17	Denver Douglas Gross (USA)	144
20	Kiarash Farzan (RSA)	140
4	Suleyman Araz (TUR)	145

Quarterfinal
5	Muhammed Yetim (TUR)	146
4	Suleyman Araz (TUR)	145

=== Section 3 ===
Round of 64
35	Amirul Amin Abd Rahim (MAS)	136
30	Jeongmin Kim (KOR)	139
19	Anton Bulaev (RUS)	142
46	Jia Wei Aden Neo (SGP)	137
43	Ansar Yagudiyev (KAZ)	132
22	Hsiang-Hsuan Chen (TPE)	145
27	Stas Modic (SLO)	143
38	Vladimir Sorokin (KAZ)	139

Round of 32
3	Mohammadsaleh Palizban (IRI)	143
30	Jeongmin Kim (KOR)	138
19	Anton Bulaev (RUS)	146
14	Remy Leonard (AUS)	137
11	Josh Barry Isenhoff (USA)	146
22	Hsiang-Hsuan Chen (TPE)	145
27	Stas Modic (SLO)	140
6	Miguel Becerra Rivas (MEX)	141

Round of 16
3	Mohammadsaleh Palizban (IRI)	146
19	Anton Bulaev (RUS)	147
11	Josh Barry Isenhoff (USA)	136
6	Miguel Becerra Rivas (MEX)	146

Quarterfinal
19	Anton Bulaev (RUS)	145
6	Miguel Becerra Rivas (MEX)	144

=== Section 4 ===
Round of 64
39	Samuel Hudson (NZL)	139 (T8)
26	Viviano Mior (ITA)	139 (T10)
23	Yann Damour (FRA)	138
42	Daniel Foley (IRL)	141
31	Prima Wisnu Wardhana (INA)	139 (T8)
34	Jun Hui Goh (SGP)	139 (T10)

Round of 32
7	Viktor Orosz (HUN)	142
26	Viviano Mior (ITA)	144
42	Daniel Foley (IRL)	142
10	Rajat Chauhan (IND)	144
15	Robin Jaatma (EST)	143
18	Lukasz Przybylski (POL)	144
34	Jun Hui Goh (SGP)	139
2	Rodolfo Gonzalez De Alba (MEX)	138

Round of 16
26	Viviano Mior (ITA)	140
10	Rajat Chauhan (IND)	145
18	Lucasz Przybylski (POL)	147
34	Jun Hui Goh (SGP)	139

Quarterfinal
10	Rajat Chauhan (IND)	146 (T9)
18	Lucasz Przybylski (POL)	146 (TX)

=== Final Round ===
Semifinals
1	Jongho Kim (KOR)	127
5	Muhammed Yetim (TUR)	144
19	Anton Bulaev (RUS)	148
18	Lucasz Przybylski (POL)	146

Final
5	Muhammed Yetim (TUR)	147 (T10)
19	Anton Bulaev (RUS)	147 (T10)
Bronze Medal
1	Jongho Kim (KOR)	146
18	Lucasz Przybylski (POL)	145
