= Archery at the 2019 Summer Universiade =

Archery at the XXX Summer Universiade
- Venues: Partenio Stadium
- Dates: 9–13 July

Archery was contested at the 2019 Summer Universiade from 9 to 13 July at the Partenio Stadium in Avellino, for the qualifications, and then at the Reggia di Caserta, in Italy.

== Participant nations ==
203 archers from 45 nations participated at the 2019 Summer Universiade.

- Argentina (2)
- Australia (4)
- China (4)
- Chinese Taipei (8)
- Croatia (2)
- Cyprus (2)
- Czech Republic (3)
- Estonia (6)
- France (6)
- Germany (3)
- Great Britain (7)
- Hong Kong (2)
- Hungary (2)
- India (8)
- Indonesia (8)
- Iran (4)
- Ireland (3)
- Italy (8)
- Japan (6)
- Kazakhstan (8)
- South Korea (8)
- Malaysia (8)
- Mexico (8)
- Moldova (3)
- Mongolia (3)
- Netherlands (3)
- New Zealand (2)
- Philippines (4)
- Poland (5)
- Russia (8)
- San Marino (1)
- Saudi Arabia (1)
- Singapore (6)
- Slovakia (2)
- Slovenia (5)
- South Africa (2)
- Spain (5)
- Sweden (3)
- Switzerland (4)
- Turkey (4)
- Turkmenistan (1)
- Ukraine (8)
- United States (8)
- Uzbekistan (4)
- Virgin Islands (1)

== Medal summary ==
=== Medal table ===
Rank	Nation	Gold	Silver	Bronze	Total
1	South Korea	4	2	2	8
2	Russia	2	2	0	4
3	Chinese Taipei	1	2	2	5
4	Turkey	1	2	1	4
5	Mexico	1	0	1	2
6	Estonia	1	0	0	1
7	Japan	0	1	1	2
8	Iran	0	1	0	1
9	Ukraine	0	0	2	2
10	United States	0	0	1	1
Totals (10 entries)		10	10	10	30

=== Recurve ===
Event	Gold	Silver	Bronze
Men's individual	Lee Woo-seok; South Korea	Erdem Tsydypov; Russia	Yuta Ishii; Japan
Men's team	Russia (RUS); Erdem Tsydypov; Beligto Tsynguev	Chinese Taipei (TPE); Tang Chih-chun; Wei Chun-heng	United States (USA); Adam Heidt; Matthew Zumbo
Women's individual	Kang Chae-young; South Korea	Choi Mi-sun; South Korea	Peng Chia-mao; Chinese Taipei
Women's team	South Korea (KOR); Choi Mi-sun; Kang Chae-young	Russia (RUS); Svetlana Gomboeva; Valeria Mylnikova	Ukraine (UKR); Iryna Khochyna; Polina Rodionova
Mixed team	Chinese Taipei (TPE); Peng Chia-mao; Wei Chun-heng	Japan (JPN); Risa Horiguchi; Yuta Ishii	Ukraine (UKR); Polina Rodionova; Artem Ovchynnikov

=== Compound ===
Event	Gold	Silver	Bronze
Men's individual	Anton Bulaev; Russia	Muhammed Yetim; Turkey	Kim Jong-ho; South Korea
Men's team	Turkey (TUR); Süleyman Araz; Muhammed Yetim	Iran (IRI); Kiarash Farzan; Mohammad Saleh Palizban	Mexico (MEX); Miguel Becerra; Rodolfo González
Women's individual	Andrea Becerra; Mexico	So Chae-won; South Korea	Yeşim Bostan; Turkey
Women's team	South Korea (KOR); Kim Yun-hee; So Chae-won	Turkey (TUR); Yeşim Bostan; Gizem Elmaağaçlı	Chinese Taipei (TPE); Chen Yi-hsuan; Lin Ming-ching
Mixed team	Estonia (EST); Lisell Jäätma; Robin Jäätma	Chinese Taipei (TPE); Chen Yi-hsuan; Chen Chieh-lun	South Korea (KOR); So Chae-won; Kim Jong-ho
