= 2019 Archery World Cup =

International archery competition

- Sport: Archery
- Duration: 22 April – 7 September

World Cup Final
- Recurve Men: (gold) (United States) Brady Ellison; (silver) (Italy) Mauro Nespoli; (bronze) (Netherlands) Sjef van den Berg
- Recurve Women: (gold) (South Korea) Kang Chae-young; (silver) (Chinese Taipei) Tan Ya-ting; (bronze) (China) Zheng Yichai
- Compound Men: (gold) (Netherlands) Mike Schloesser; (silver) (United States) Braden Gellenthien; (bronze) (Colombia) Daniel Muñoz
- Compound Women: (gold) (Colombia) Sara López; (silver) (Russia) Natalia Avdeeva; (bronze) (France) Sophie Dodemont

Seasons
- ← 2018 2021 →

The 2019 Archery World Cup, also known as the Hyundai Archery World Cup for sponsorship reasons, was the 14th edition of the international archery circuit organised annually by World Archery. The 2019 World Cup consisted of five events, and ran from 22 April to 7 September 2019.

== Calendar ==
The calendar for the 2019 World Cup, announced by World Archery.

Stage	Date	Location	Ref.
1	22–28 April	Medellín, Colombia	
2	6–12 May	Shanghai, China	
3	20–26 May	Antalya, Turkey	
4	1–7 July	Berlin, Germany	
Final	6–7 September	Moscow, Russia	

== Results ==
=== Recurve ===
==== Men's individual ====
Stage	Location	1st place, gold medalist(s)	2nd place, silver medalist(s)	3rd place, bronze medalist(s)
1	(Colombia) Medellín	(United States) Brady Ellison	(South Korea) Lee Woo-seok	(South Korea) Kim Woo-jin
2	(China) Shanghai	(South Korea) Lee Woo-seok	(South Korea) Kim Woo-jin	(United States) Brady Ellison
3	(Turkey) Antalya	(United States) Brady Ellison	(Netherlands) Steve Wijler	(Turkey) Mete Gazoz
4	(Germany) Berlin	(Turkey) Mete Gazoz	(South Korea) Bae Jae-hyeon	(Italy) Mauro Nespoli
Final	(Russia) Moscow	(United States) Brady Ellison	(Italy) Mauro Nespoli	(Netherlands) Sjef van den Berg

==== Women's individual ====
Stage	Location	1st place, gold medalist(s)	2nd place, silver medalist(s)	3rd place, bronze medalist(s)
1	(Colombia) Medellín	(South Korea) Kang Chae-young	(France) Mélanie Gaubil	(Japan) Tomomi Sugimoto
2	(China) Shanghai	(South Korea) Kang Chae-young	(Japan) Tomomi Sugimoto	(Chinese Taipei) Tan Ya-ting
3	(Turkey) Antalya	(China) Zheng Yichai	(Russia) Sayana Tsyrempilova	(Chinese Taipei) Tan Ya-ting
4	(Germany) Berlin	(South Korea) An San	(South Korea) Jeon Ina	(Chinese Taipei) Tan Ya-ting
Final	(Russia) Moscow	(South Korea) Kang Chae-young	(Chinese Taipei) Tan Ya-ting	(China) Zheng Yichai

==== Men's team ====
Stage	Location	1st place, gold medalist(s)	2nd place, silver medalist(s)	3rd place, bronze medalist(s)
1	(Colombia) Medellín	South Korea; Kim Woo-jin; Lee Seung-yun; Lee Woo-seok	Australia; David Barnes; Ryan Tyack; Taylor Worth	Netherlands; Sjef van den Berg; Rick van der Ven; Steve Wijler
2	(China) Shanghai	Chinese Taipei; Deng Yu-cheng; Tang Chih-chun; Wei Chun-heng	Turkey; Samet Ak; Fatih Bozlar; Mete Gazoz	South Korea; Kim Woo-jin; Lee Seung-yun; Lee Woo-seok
3	(Turkey) Antalya	China; Ding Yiliang; Feng Hao; Wei Shaoxuan	Italy; Marco Galiazzo; Mauro Nespoli; David Pasqualucci	United States; Brady Ellison; Thomas Stanwood; Jack Williams
4	(Germany) Berlin	Turkey; Samet Ak; Ali Aydın; Mete Gazoz	Ukraine; Oleksii Hunbin; Heorhiy Ivanytskyy; Sergii Makarevych	United States; Brady Ellison; Matthew Requa; Jack Williams

==== Women's team ====
Stage	Location	1st place, gold medalist(s)	2nd place, silver medalist(s)	3rd place, bronze medalist(s)
1	(Colombia) Medellín	South Korea; Chang Hye-jin; Choi Mi-sun; Kang Chae-young	Italy; Tatiana Andreoli; Lucilla Boari; Vanessa Landi	France; Audrey Adiceom; Lisa Barbelin; Mélanie Gaubil
2	(China) Shanghai	South Korea; Chang Hye-jin; Choi Mi-sun; Kang Chae-young	China; Xiaoqing Long; Meng Fanxu; Zheng Yichai	Chinese Taipei; Lei Chien-ying; Peng Chia-mao; Tan Ya-ting
3	(Turkey) Antalya	Chinese Taipei; Lei Chien-ying; Peng Chia-mao; Tan Ya-ting	Mexico; Mariana Avitia; Aída Román; Alejandra Valencia	Russia; Elena Osipova; Inna Stepanova; Sayana Tsyrempilova
4	(Germany) Berlin	Italy; Tanya Giaccheri; Chiara Rebagliati; Elena Tonetta	Germany; Michelle Kroppen; Elena Richter; Lisa Unruh	South Korea; An San; Jeon Ina; Jung Dasomi

==== Mixed team ====
Stage	Location	1st place, gold medalist(s)	2nd place, silver medalist(s)	3rd place, bronze medalist(s)
1	(Colombia) Medellín	South Korea; Kim Woo-jin; Kang Chae-young	United States; Brady Ellison; Casey Kaufhold	China; Wang Wenxuan; Lan Lu
2	(China) Shanghai	Chinese Taipei; Tang Chih-chun; Tan Ya-ting	Turkey; Mete Gazoz; Yasemin Anagöz	South Korea; Lee Woo-seok; Choi Mi-sun
3	(Turkey) Antalya	Spain; Miguel Alvariño; Elia Canales	Russia; Erdem Irdyneev; Elena Osipova	Turkey; Mete Gazoz; Yasemin Anagöz
4	(Germany) Berlin	South Korea; Oh Jin-hyek; An San	Moldova; Dan Olaru; Alexandra Mirca	Italy; Mauro Nespoli; Elena Tonetta
Final	(Russia) Moscow	South Korea; Kim Woo-jin; Kang Chae-young	Russia; Erdem Irdyneev; Elena Osipova	Not awarded

=== Compound ===
==== Men's individual ====
Stage	Location	1st place, gold medalist(s)	2nd place, silver medalist(s)	3rd place, bronze medalist(s)
1	(Colombia) Medellín	(Netherlands) Mike Schloesser	(United States) Braden Gellenthien	(France) Jean-Philippe Boulch
2	(China) Shanghai	(United States) Braden Gellenthien	(Belgium) Brend Frederickx	(El Salvador) Roberto Hernández
3	(Turkey) Antalya	(United States) James Lutz	(United States) Kris Schaff	(Netherlands) Mike Schloesser
4	(Germany) Berlin	(Turkey) Evren Çağıran	(Netherlands) Mike Schloesser	(United States) Kris Schaff
Final	(Russia) Moscow	(Netherlands) Mike Schloesser	(United States) Braden Gellenthien	(Colombia) Daniel Muñoz

==== Women's individual ====
Stage	Location	1st place, gold medalist(s)	2nd place, silver medalist(s)	3rd place, bronze medalist(s)
1	(Colombia) Medellín	(Colombia) Sara López	(Netherlands) Jody Vermeulen	(United States) Alexis Ruiz
2	(China) Shanghai	(South Korea) So Chae-won	(United States) Sophia Strachan	(United States) Alexis Ruiz
3	(Turkey) Antalya	(South Africa) Danelle Wentzel	(United States) Alexis Ruiz	(Chinese Taipei) Huang I-jou
4	(Germany) Berlin	(United States) Alexis Ruiz	(France) Sophie Dodemont	(Colombia) Sara López
Final	(Russia) Moscow	(Colombia) Sara López	(Russia) Natalia Avdeeva	(France) Sophie Dodemont

==== Men's team ====
Stage	Location	1st place, gold medalist(s)	2nd place, silver medalist(s)	3rd place, bronze medalist(s)
1	(Colombia) Medellín	Italy; Viviano Mior; Sergio Pagni; Federico Pagnoni	France; Jean-Philippe Boulch; Pierre-Julien Deloche; Sébastien Peineau	Netherlands; Peter Elzinga; Sil Pater; Mike Schloesser
2	(China) Shanghai	United States; Braden Gellenthien; Kris Schaff; Matt Sullivan	South Korea; Choi Yong-hee; Kim Jong-ho; Yang Jae-won	China; Sun Yingjie; Wang Yue; Xue Zheng
3	(Turkey) Antalya	Denmark; Martin Damsbo; Stephan Hansen; Mads Knudsen	Turkey; Süleyman Araz; Evren Çağıran; Muhammed Yetim	India; Rajat Chauhan; Aman Saini; Abhishek Verma
4	(Germany) Berlin	France; Jean-Philippe Boulch; Pierre-Julien Deloche; Sébastien Peineau	Denmark; Martin Damsbo; Stephan Hansen; Mads Knudsen	United States; Braden Gellenthien; Kris Schaff; Matt Sullivan

==== Women's team ====
Stage	Location	1st place, gold medalist(s)	2nd place, silver medalist(s)	3rd place, bronze medalist(s)
1	(Colombia) Medellín	Colombia; Sara López; Alexandra Sandino; Alejandra Usquiano	United States; Alexis Ruiz; Sophia Strachan; Jamie Van Natta	Italy; Anastasia Anastasio; Sara Ret; Marcella Tonioli
2	(China) Shanghai	United States; Alexis Ruiz; Sophia Strachan; Jamie Van Natta	South Korea; Choi Bo-min; Kim Yun-hee; So Chae-won	Turkey; Yeşim Bostan; Gizem Elmaağaçlı; İpek Tomruk
3	(Turkey) Antalya	United States; Cassidy Cox; Paige Pearce; Alexis Ruiz	Russia; Natalia Avdeeva; Viktoria Balzhanova; Alexandra Savenkova	United Kingdom; Layla Annison; Ella Gibson; Lucy Mason
4	(Germany) Berlin	Turkey; Yeşim Bostan; Gizem Elmaağaçlı; İpek Tomruk	United Kingdom; Susan Corless; Ella Gibson; Sarah Moon	United States; Cassidy Cox; Alexis Ruiz; Sophia Strachan

==== Mixed team ====
Stage	Location	1st place, gold medalist(s)	2nd place, silver medalist(s)	3rd place, bronze medalist(s)
1	(Colombia) Medellín	United States; Matt Sullivan; Alexis Ruiz	France; Pierre-Julien Deloche; Sophie Dodemont	Colombia; Jagdeep Singh; Sara López
2	(China) Shanghai	United States; Matt Sullivan; Alexis Ruiz	Belgium; Brend Frederickx; Sarah Prieels	Iran; Mohammad Saleh Palizban; Vida Halimian
3	(Turkey) Antalya	South Africa; Reuben Brent-Meek; Jeanine van Kradenburg	Denmark; Stephan Hansen; Tanja Jensen	Turkey; Muhammed Yetim; Yeşim Bostan
4	(Germany) Berlin	United Kingdom; James Mason; Ella Gibson	Slovenia; Staš Modic; Toja Ellison	Russia; Alexander Dambaev; Viktoria Balzhanova
Final	(Russia) Moscow	United States; Braden Gellenthien; Alexis Ruiz	Russia; Pavel Krylov; Elizaveta Knyazeva	Not awarded

== Medals table ==
Rank	Nation	Gold	Silver	Bronze	Total
1	United States	12	7	8	27
2	South Korea	12	6	5	23
3	Turkey	4	3	4	11
4	Chinese Taipei	3	1	5	9
5	Colombia	3	0	3	6
6	Netherlands	2	3	4	9
7	Italy	2	3	2	7
8	China	2	1	3	6
9	South Africa	2	0	0	2
10	France	1	4	3	8
11	Denmark	1	2	0	3
12	Great Britain	1	1	1	3
13	Spain	1	0	0	1
14	Russia	0	6	2	8
15	Belgium	0	2	0	2
16	Japan	0	1	1	2
17	Australia	0	1	0	1
17	Germany	0	1	0	1
17	Mexico	0	1	0	1
17	Moldova	0	1	0	1
17	Slovenia	0	1	0	1
17	Ukraine	0	1	0	1
23	El Salvador	0	0	1	1
23	India	0	0	1	1
23	Iran	0	0	1	1
Totals (25 entries)		46	46	44	136
