= 2018 Archery World Cup =

International archery competition

- Sport: Archery
- Duration: 23 April – 30 September

World Cup Final
- Recurve Men: (gold) (South Korea) Kim Woo-jin; (silver) (South Korea) Lee Woo-seok; (bronze) (United States) Brady Ellison
- Recurve Women: (gold) (South Korea) Lee Eun-gyeong; (silver) (Turkey) Yasemin Anagöz; (bronze) (India) Deepika Kumari
- Compound Men: (gold) (United States) Kris Schaff; (silver) (Turkey) Demir Elmaağaçlı; (bronze) (India) Abhishek Verma
- Compound Women: (gold) (Colombia) Sara López; (silver) (Mexico) Linda Ochoa-Anderson; (bronze) (South Korea) So Chae-won

Seasons
- ← 2017 2019 →

The 2018 Archery World Cup, also known as the Hyundai Archery World Cup for sponsorship reasons, was the 13th edition of the international archery circuit organised annually by World Archery. The 2018 World Cup consisted of five events, and ran from 23 April to 30 September 2018.

== Calendar ==
The calendar for the 2018 World Cup, announced by World Archery.

| Stage | Date | Location | Ref. |
|---|---|---|---|
| 1 | 23–29 April | Shanghai, China | |
| 2 | 20–26 May | Antalya, Turkey | |
| 3 | 18–24 June | Salt Lake City, United States | |
| 4 | 16–22 July | Berlin, Germany | |
| Final | 29–30 September | Samsun, Turkey | |

== Results ==
=== Recurve ===
==== Men's individual ====
| Stage | Location | 1st place, gold medalist(s) | 2nd place, silver medalist(s) | 3rd place, bronze medalist(s) |
|---|---|---|---|---|
| 1 | (China) Shanghai | (South Korea) Kim Woo-jin | (United States) Brady Ellison | (South Korea) Lee Woo-seok |
| 2 | (Turkey) Antalya | (South Korea) Lee Woo-seok | (South Korea) Kim Woo-jin | (South Korea) Oh Jin-hyek |
| 3 | (United States) Salt Lake City | (Italy) Mauro Nespoli | (Netherlands) Steve Wijler | (France) Thomas Chirault |
| 4 | (Germany) Berlin | (Turkey) Mete Gazoz | (South Korea) Lee Woo-seok | (Australia) Taylor Worth |
| Final | (Turkey) Samsun | (South Korea) Kim Woo-jin | (South Korea) Lee Woo-seok | (United States) Brady Ellison |

==== Women's individual ====
| Stage | Location | 1st place, gold medalist(s) | 2nd place, silver medalist(s) | 3rd place, bronze medalist(s) |
|---|---|---|---|---|
| 1 | (China) Shanghai | (South Korea) Chang Hye-jin | (China) An Qixuan | (Italy) Vanessa Landi |
| 2 | (Turkey) Antalya | (Russia) Ksenia Perova | (South Korea) Chang Hye-jin | (Chinese Taipei) Lei Chien-ying |
| 3 | (United States) Salt Lake City | (India) Deepika Kumari | (Germany) Michelle Kroppen | (Chinese Taipei) Tan Ya-ting |
| 4 | (Germany) Berlin | (South Korea) Lee Eun-gyeong | (Germany) Lisa Unruh | (South Korea) Jung Dasomi |
| Final | (Turkey) Samsun | (South Korea) Lee Eun-gyeong | (Turkey) Yasemin Anagöz | (India) Deepika Kumari |

==== Men's team ====
| Stage | Location | 1st place, gold medalist(s) | 2nd place, silver medalist(s) | 3rd place, bronze medalist(s) |
|---|---|---|---|---|
| 1 | (China) Shanghai | South Korea; Lee Woo-seok; Oh Jin-hyek; Kim Woo-jin | Japan; Hiroki Muto; Tomoaki Kuraya; Takaharu Furukawa | Germany; Florian Unruh; Felix Wieser; Maximilian Weckmüller |
| 2 | (Turkey) Antalya | South Korea; Lee Woo-seok; Im Dong-hyun; Kim Woo-jin | Japan; Hiroki Muto; Tomoaki Kuraya; Takaharu Furukawa | United Kingdom; Tom Hall; Patrick Huston; Alex Wise |
| 3 | (United States) Salt Lake City | Netherlands; Jan van Tongeren; Steve Wijler; Sjef van den Berg | China; Li Jialun; Sun Quan; Wang Dapeng | Malaysia; Khairul Anuar Mohamad; Muhammad Akmal Nor Hasrin; Haziq Kamaruddin |
| 4 | (Germany) Berlin | Chinese Taipei; Wei Chun-heng; Jao Ting-yu; Tang Chih-chun | South Korea; Lee Woo-seok; Im Dong-hyun; Kim Woo-jin | Australia; Ryan Tyack; Taylor Worth; David Barnes |

==== Women's team ====
| Stage | Location | 1st place, gold medalist(s) | 2nd place, silver medalist(s) | 3rd place, bronze medalist(s) |
|---|---|---|---|---|
| 1 | (China) Shanghai | South Korea; Kang Chae-young; Lee Eun-gyeong; Chang Hye-jin | Chinese Taipei; Peng Chia-mao; Tan Ya-ting; Lei Chien-ying | China; Qi Yuhong; An Qixuan; Cao Hui |
| 2 | (Turkey) Antalya | South Korea; Kang Chae-young; Lee Eun-gyeong; Chang Hye-jin | Germany; Michelle Kroppen; Lisa Unruh; Elena Richter | Chinese Taipei; Peng Chia-mao; Tan Ya-ting; Lei Chien-ying |
| 3 | (United States) Salt Lake City | Chinese Taipei; Peng Chia-mao; Tan Ya-ting; Lei Chien-ying | Mexico; Ana Vázquez; Aída Román; Alejandra Valencia | Japan; Tomoka Ohashi; Yuki Hayashi; Ren Hayakawa |
| 4 | (Germany) Berlin | South Korea; Jung Dasomi; Kang Chae-young; Chang Hye-jin | United Kingdom; Bryony Pitman; Eleanor Piper; Sarah Bettles | Chinese Taipei; Peng Chia-mao; Tan Ya-ting; Lei Chien-ying |

==== Mixed team ====
| Stage | Location | 1st place, gold medalist(s) | 2nd place, silver medalist(s) | 3rd place, bronze medalist(s) |
|---|---|---|---|---|
| 1 | (China) Shanghai | South Korea; Chang Hye-jin; Kim Woo-jin | Turkey; Yasemin Anagöz; Mete Gazoz | Indonesia; Diananda Choirunisa; Riau Ega Agatha |
| 2 | (Turkey) Antalya | Japan; Tomomi Sugimoto; Takaharu Furukawa | South Korea; Chang Hye-jin; Kim Woo-jin | Turkey; Yasemin Anagöz; Mete Gazoz |
| 3 | (United States) Salt Lake City | United States; Brady Ellison; Mackenzie Brown | Russia; Arsalan Baldanov; Natalia Erdynieva | Chinese Taipei; Tan Ya-ting; Tang Chih-chun |
| 4 | (Germany) Berlin | Chinese Taipei; Wei Chun-heng; Tan Ya-ting | South Korea; Lee Woo-seok; Chang Hye-jin | Turkey; Yasemin Anagöz; Mete Gazoz |
| Final | (Turkey) Samsun | South Korea; Chang Hye-jin; Kim Woo-jin | Turkey; Yasemin Anagöz; Mete Gazoz | Not awarded |

=== Compound ===
==== Men's individual ====
| Stage | Location | 1st place, gold medalist(s) | 2nd place, silver medalist(s) | 3rd place, bronze medalist(s) |
|---|---|---|---|---|
| 1 | (China) Shanghai | (South Korea) Kim Jong-ho | (Italy) Federico Pagnoni | (United States) Braden Gellenthien |
| 2 | (Turkey) Antalya | (Netherlands) Mike Schloesser | (United States) Kris Schaff | (United States) Braden Gellenthien |
| 3 | (United States) Salt Lake City | (Denmark) Stephan Hansen | (India) Abishek Verma | (Russia) Anton Bulaev |
| 4 | (Germany) Berlin | (Netherlands) Mike Schloesser | (Croatia) Domagoj Buden | (France) Sebastien Peineau |
| Final | (Turkey) Samsun | (United States) Kris Schaff | (Turkey) Demir Elmaağaçlı | (India) Abishek Verma |

==== Women's individual ====
| Stage | Location | 1st place, gold medalist(s) | 2nd place, silver medalist(s) | 3rd place, bronze medalist(s) |
|---|---|---|---|---|
| 1 | (China) Shanghai | (Colombia) Sara López | (Chinese Taipei) Chen Yi-hsuan | (South Korea) So Chae-won |
| 2 | (Turkey) Antalya | (Turkey) Yeşim Bostan | (United States) Paige Pearce | (South Korea) So Chae-won |
| 3 | (United States) Salt Lake City | (Colombia) Sara López | (Mexico) Linda Ochoa-Anderson | (France) Sophie Dodemont |
| 4 | (Germany) Berlin | (France) Sophie Dodemont | (Netherlands) Jody Vermeulen | (Italy) Marcella Tonioli |
| Final | (Turkey) Samsun | (Colombia) Sara López | (Mexico) Linda Ochoa-Anderson | (South Korea) So Chae-won |

==== Men's team ====
| Stage | Location | 1st place, gold medalist(s) | 2nd place, silver medalist(s) | 3rd place, bronze medalist(s) |
|---|---|---|---|---|
| 1 | (China) Shanghai | United States; Reo Wilde; Braden Gellenthien; Kris Schaff | South Korea; Kim Jong-ho; Kim Tae-yoon; Choi Yong-hee | France; Jean Philippe Boulch; Sebastien Peineau; Pierre-Julien Deloche |
| 2 | (Turkey) Antalya | South Korea; Kim Jong-ho; Hong Sung-ho; Choi Yong-hee | United States; Steve Anderson; Braden Gellenthien; Kris Schaff | Russia; Anton Bulaev; Dmitrii Voronov; Alexander Dambaev |
| 3 | (United States) Salt Lake City | United States; Steve Anderson; Reo Wilde; Kris Schaff | Mexico; Antonio Hidalgo; Romeo Treviño; Miguel Becerra | Chinese Taipei; Lin Che-wei; Chen Hsiang-hsuan; Pan Yu-ping |
| 4 | (Germany) Berlin | Croatia; Ivan Markes; Mario Vavro; Domagoj Buden | United States; Steve Anderson; Braden Gellenthien; Kris Schaff | Italy; Elia Fregnan; Valerio Della Stua; Sergio Pagni |

==== Women's team ====
| Stage | Location | 1st place, gold medalist(s) | 2nd place, silver medalist(s) | 3rd place, bronze medalist(s) |
|---|---|---|---|---|
| 1 | (China) Shanghai | Russia; Alexandra Savenkova; Viktoria Balzhanova; Natalia Avdeeva | Chinese Taipei; Chen Yi-hsuan; Lin Ming-ching; Huang I-jou | Netherlands; Martine Stas-Couwenberg; Sanne De Laat; Jody Vermeulen |
| 2 | (Turkey) Antalya | Chinese Taipei; Chen Li-ju; Chen Yi-hsuan; Lin Ming-ching | India; Jyothi Surekha Vennam; Muskan Kirar; Divya Dhayal | South Korea; Choi Bo-min; Kim Yun-hee; So Chae-won |
| 3 | (United States) Salt Lake City | Colombia; Nora Valdez; Alejandra Usquiano; Sara López | Chinese Taipei; Chen Li-ju; Chen Yi-hsuan; Huang I-jou | United States; Lexi Keller; Christie Colin; Jamie van Natta |
| 4 | (Germany) Berlin | France; Sandra Herve; Amelie Sancenot; Sophie Dodemont | India; Jyothi Surekha Vennam; Trisha Deb; Muskan Kirar | Turkey; Yeşim Bostan; Ayse Bera Suzer; Gizem Elmaagacli |

==== Mixed team ====
| Stage | Location | 1st place, gold medalist(s) | 2nd place, silver medalist(s) | 3rd place, bronze medalist(s) |
|---|---|---|---|---|
| 1 | (China) Shanghai | Denmark; Tanja Gellenthien; Martin Damsbo | South Korea; Kim Jong-ho; Choi Bo-min | India; Jyothi Surekha Vennam; Abhishek Verma |
| 2 | (Turkey) Antalya | France; Sophie Dodemont; Pierre-Julien Deloche | South Korea; Kim Jong-ho; So Chae-won | India; Jyothi Surekha Vennam; Abhishek Verma |
| 3 | (United States) Salt Lake City | France; Sebastien Peineau; Sophie Dodemont | Russia; Anton Bulaev; Natalia Avdeeva | India; Jyothi Surekha Vennam; Abhishek Verma |
| 4 | (Germany) Berlin | United States; Paige Pearce; Kris Schaff | Denmark; Tanja Gellenthien; Stephan Hansen | India; Jyothi Surekha Vennam; Abhishek Verma |
| Final | (Turkey) Samsun | Turkey; Yeşim Bostan; Demir Elmaağaçlı | India; Jyothi Surekha Vennam; Abhishek Verma | Not awarded |

== Medals table ==
| Rank | Nation | Gold | Silver | Bronze | Total |
|---|---|---|---|---|---|
| 1 | South Korea | 15 | 10 | 7 | 32 |
| 2 | United States | 5 | 5 | 4 | 14 |
| 3 | Chinese Taipei | 4 | 4 | 6 | 14 |
| 4 | France | 4 | 0 | 4 | 8 |
| 5 | Colombia | 4 | 0 | 0 | 4 |
| 6 | Turkey | 3 | 4 | 3 | 10 |
| 7 | Netherlands | 3 | 2 | 1 | 6 |
| 8 | Russia | 2 | 2 | 2 | 6 |
| 9 | Denmark | 2 | 1 | 0 | 3 |
| 10 | India | 1 | 4 | 6 | 11 |
| 11 | Japan | 1 | 2 | 1 | 4 |
| 12 | Italy | 1 | 1 | 3 | 5 |
| 13 | Croatia | 1 | 1 | 0 | 2 |
| 14 | Mexico | 0 | 4 | 0 | 4 |
| 15 | Germany | 0 | 3 | 1 | 4 |
| 16 | China | 0 | 2 | 1 | 3 |
| 17 | Great Britain | 0 | 1 | 1 | 2 |
| 18 | Australia | 0 | 0 | 2 | 2 |
| 19 | Indonesia | 0 | 0 | 1 | 1 |
| 19 | Malaysia | 0 | 0 | 1 | 1 |
| Totals (20 entries) | | 46 | 46 | 44 | 136 |
