= Archery at the 2017 Summer Universiade – Women's individual compound =

Women's compound individual at the XXIX Summer Universiade
- Venues: National Taiwan Sport University Stadium
- Dates: August 20, 2017 – August 23, 2017
- Competitors: 52 from 24 nations

Medalists
| 1st place, gold medalist(s) | | Song Yun-soo | South Korea |
| 2nd place, silver medalist(s) | | Chen Yi-hsuan | Chinese Taipei |
| 3rd place, bronze medalist(s) | | So Chae-won | South Korea |

The women's individual compound archery competition at the 2017 Summer Universiade was held in the National Taiwan Sport University Stadium, Taipei, Taiwan between August 20 and 21, 2017, and the finals on the August 23.

== Records ==
Prior to the competition, the world and Universiade records were as follows.

- 72 arrows ranking round

| Category | Athlete | Record | Date | Place | Event |
|---|---|---|---|---|---|
| World record | (Colombia) Sara López | 713 | 29 August 2015 | Medellín, Colombia | 2016 Selectivo Nacional |
| Universiade record | (Mexico) Stephanie Salinas | 697 | 4 July 2015 | Gwangju, South Korea | 2015 Summer Universiade |

- 15 arrows final match

| Category | Athlete | Record | Date | Place | Event |
|---|---|---|---|---|---|
| World record | (Colombia) Sara López | 150 (10) | 18 July 2013 | Medellín, Colombia | 2013 Archery World Cup |
| Universiade record | (Slovenia) Toja Cerne | 149 | 7 July 2015 | Gwangju, South Korea | 2015 Summer Universiade |

== Ranking round ==
The ranking round took place on 20 August 2017 to determine the seeding for the elimination rounds. It consisted of two rounds of 36 arrows, with a maximum score of 720.

| Rank | Archer | 1st Half | 2nd Half | 10s | Xs | Score | Notes |
|---|---|---|---|---|---|---|---|
| 1 | So Chae-won (KOR) | 346 | 343 | 42 | 16 | 689 | |
| 2 | Yeşim Bostan (TUR) | 344 | 345 | 41 | 19 | 689 | |
| 3 | Fernanda Alexis Zepeda Preciado (MEX) | 349 | 339 | 44 | 21 | 688 | |
| 4 | Song Yun-soo (KOR) | 342 | 344 | 39 | 10 | 686 | |
| 5 | Gizem Elmaağaçlı (TUR) | 345 | 339 | 41 | 18 | 684 | |
| 6 | Hope Lauren Greenwood (GBR) | 340 | 343 | 41 | 10 | 683 | |
| 7 | Alexandra Laury Blazek (USA) | 341 | 342 | 40 | 16 | 683 | |
| 8 | Sarah Prieels (BEL) | 338 | 344 | 39 | 9 | 682 | |
| 9 | Fereshteh Ghorbani (IRI) | 337 | 345 | 38 | 14 | 682 | |
| 10 | Fatin Nurfateha Mat Salleh (MAS) | 344 | 337 | 41 | 12 | 681 | |
| 11 | Jody Johanna Ma Vermeulen (NED) | 336 | 344 | 39 | 12 | 680 | |
| 12 | Snehel Vishnu Mandhare (IND) | 339 | 341 | 38 | 12 | 680 | |
| 13 | Brenda Merino Escudero (MEX) | 341 | 339 | 37 | 15 | 680 | |
| 14 | Chen Yi-hsuan (TPE) | 345 | 333 | 36 | 14 | 678 | |
| 15 | Wu Ting-ting (TPE) | 337 | 340 | 36 | 15 | 677 | |
| 16 | Jyothi Surekha Vennam (IND) | 337 | 339 | 36 | 11 | 676 | |
| 17 | Sri Ranti (INA) | 332 | 342 | 33 | 9 | 674 | |
| 18 | Diana Tonteva (RUS) | 341 | 333 | 31 | 10 | 674 | |
| 19 | Kim Yun-hee (KOR) | 334 | 339 | 34 | 9 | 673 | |
| 20 | Sophia Walden Strachen (USA) | 336 | 337 | 33 | 12 | 673 | |
| 21 | Marila Vinogradova (RUS) | 339 | 334 | 31 | 15 | 673 | |
| 22 | Mariya Shkolna (POL) | 338 | 334 | 33 | 12 | 672 | |
| 23 | Abril Trinidad Lopez Benitez (MEX) | 335 | 335 | 34 | 11 | 670 | |
| 24 | Prabhjot Kaur (IND) | 333 | 337 | 33 | 10 | 670 | |
| 25 | Tiara Sakti Ramadhani (INA) | 333 | 337 | 32 | 16 | 670 | |
| 26 | Janine Meissner (GER) | 335 | 334 | 34 | 12 | 669 | |
| 27 | Aleksandra Savenkova (RUS) | 337 | 332 | 33 | 10 | 669 | |
| 28 | Ecem Cansu Coşkun (TUR) | 324 | 343 | 31 | 6 | 667 | |
| 29 | Elizabeth Mary Randle (NZL) | 336 | 330 | 30 | 10 | 666 | |
| 30 | Nurul Syazhera Mohd Asmi (MAS) | 332 | 332 | 28 | 12 | 664 | |
| 31 | Afsanaeh Shafieialavueh (IRI) | 334 | 330 | 28 | 11 | 664 | |
| 32 | Iman Aisyah Norazam (MAS) | 329 | 335 | 24 | 4 | 664 | |
| 33 | Isabella Maria Bastiani (USA) | 333 | 330 | 30 | 13 | 663 | |
| 34 | Lee Wan Yi (HKG) | 333 | 328 | 31 | 9 | 661 | |
| 35 | Nina Dudareva (KAZ) | 332 | 328 | 27 | 12 | 660 | |
| 36 | Diana Makarchuk (KAZ) | 328 | 330 | 29 | 8 | 658 | |
| 37 | Shiva Bakhtiari (IRI) | 323 | 335 | 28 | 7 | 658 | |
| 38 | Rebecca Nicole Blewett (GBR) | 332 | 326 | 23 | 7 | 658 | |
| 39 | Lee Ting-hsuan (TPE) | 330 | 327 | 29 | 11 | 657 | |
| 40 | Loh Tze Chieh Conte (SGP) | 329 | 327 | 26 | 6 | 656 | |
| 41 | Emily Hoim (EST) | 327 | 326 | 24 | 6 | 653 | |
| 42 | Runa Grydeland (NOR) | 313 | 336 | 25 | 8 | 649 | |
| 43 | Christina Gunawan (SGP) | 327 | 322 | 23 | 8 | 649 | |
| 44 | Olena Borysenko (UKR) | 319 | 330 | 22 | 6 | 649 | |
| 45 | Madeleine Ong Xue Li (SGP) | 325 | 317 | 19 | 6 | 642 | |
| 46 | Viktoriya Lyan (KAZ) | 326 | 316 | 11 | 3 | 642 | |
| 47 | Isabella Ferrua (ITA) | 323 | 317 | 25 | 13 | 640 | |
| 48 | Lam Claudia Wing Tung (HKG) | 325 | 313 | 22 | 11 | 638 | |
| 49 | Nonna Kostenets (UKR) | 317 | 311 | 12 | 2 | 628 | |
| 50 | Melissa Agustin Regnasco (ARG) | 318 | 308 | 13 | 3 | 626 | |
| 51 | Ilaria Spanu (ITA) | 311 | 310 | 14 | 6 | 621 | |
| 52 | Matilde Pittarelli (ITA) | 292 | 305 | 15 | 2 | 597 | |

== Elimination rounds ==
=== Section 1 ===
Round of 64
33 | Isabella Maria Bastiani (USA) | 139
32 | Iman Aisyah Norazam (MAS) | 140
17 | Sri Ranti (INA) | 139
48 | Lam Claudia Wing Tung (HKG) | 127
49 | Nonna Kostenets (UKR) | 129
16 | Jyothi Surekha Vennam (IND) | 141
41 | Emily Hoim (EST) | 135
24 | Prabhjot Kaur (IND) | 137
25 | Tiara Sakti Ramadhani (INA) | 131
40 | Loh Tze Chieh Conte (SGP) | 132

Round of 32
1 | So Chae-won (KOR) | 141
32 | Iman Aisyah Norazam (MAS) | 136
17 | Sri Ranti (INA) | 136
16 | Jyothi Surekha Vennam (IND) | 134
9 | Fereshteh Ghorbani (IRI) | 137
24 | Prabhjot Kaur (IND) | 135
40 | Loh Tze Chieh Conte (SGP) | 134
8 | Sarah Prieels (BEL) | 144

Round of 16
1 | So Chae-won (KOR) | 145
17 | Sri Ranti (INA) | 140
9 | Fereshteh Ghorbani (IRI) | 141
8 | Sarah Prieels (BEL) | 143

Quarterfinal
1 | So Chae-won (KOR) | 146
8 | Sarah Prieels (BEL) | 141

=== Section 2 ===
Round of 64
37 | Shiva Bakhtiari (IRI) | 141
28 | Ecem Cansu Coşkun (TUR) | 145
21 | Marila Vinogradova (RUS) | 143
44 | Olena Borysenko (UKR) | 135
13 | Brenda Merino Escudero (MEX) | 143
52 | Matilde Pittarelli (ITA) | 125
45 | Madeleine Ong Xue Li (SGP) | 133
20 | Sophia Walden Strachen (USA) | 142
29 | Elizabeth Mary Randle (NZL) | 142
36 | Diana Makarchuk (KAZ) | 139

Round of 32
5 | Gizem Elmaağaçlı (TUR) | 137
28 | Ecem Cansu Coşkun (TUR) | 135
21 | Marila Vinogradova (RUS) | 136 (T7)
12 | Snehel Vishnu Mandhare (IND) | 136 (T10)
13 | Brenda Merino Escudero (MEX) | 142
20 | Sophia Walden Strachen (USA) | 132
29 | Elizabeth Mary Randle (NZL) | 136
4 | Song Yun-soo (KOR) | 145

Round of 16
5 | Gizem Elmaağaçlı (TUR) | 142
12 | Snehel Vishnu Mandhare (IND) | 143
13 | Brenda Merino Escudero (MEX) | 142
4 | Song Yun-soo (KOR) | 143

Quarterfinal
12 | Snehel Vishnu Mandhare (IND) | 142
4 | Song Yun-soo (KOR) | 144

=== Section 3 ===
Round of 64
35 | Nina Dudareva (KAZ) | 141
30 | Nurul Syazhera Mohd Asmi (MAS) | 136
19 | Kim Yun-hee (KOR) | 135
46 | Viktoriya Lyan (KAZ) | 140
51 | Ilaria Spanu (ITA) | 129
14 | Chen Yi-hsuan (TPE) | 138
43 | Christina Gunawan (SGP) | 139
22 | Mariya Shkolna (POL) | 142
27 | Aleksandra Savenkova (RUS) | 141
38 | Rebecca Nicole Blewett (GBR) | 136

Round of 32
3 | Fernanda Alexis Zepeda Preciado (MEX) | 139
35 | Nina Dudareva (KAZ) | 132
46 | Viktoriya Lyan (KAZ) | 134
14 | Chen Yi-hsuan (TPE) | 145
11 | Jody Johanna Ma Vermeulen (NED) | 136
22 | Mariya Shkolna (POL) | 140
27 | Aleksandra Savenkova (RUS) | 138
6 | Hope Lauren Greenwood (GBR) | 135

Round of 16
3 | Fernanda Alexis Zepeda Preciado (MEX) | 143 (T7)
14 | Chen Yi-hsuan (TPE) | 143 (T10)
22 | Mariya Shkolna (POL) | 143
27 | Aleksandra Savenkova (RUS) | 140

Quarterfinal
14 | Chen Yi-hsuan (TPE) | 146
22 | Mariya Shkolna (POL) | 142

=== Section 4 ===
Round of 64
39 | Lee Ting-hsuan (TPE) | 138
26 | Janine Meissner (GER) | 137
23 | Abril Trinidad Lopez Benitez (MEX) | 141
42 | Runa Grydeland (NOR) | 138
15 | Wu Ting-ting (TPE) | 143
50 | Melissa Agustin Regnasco (ARG) | 132
47 | Isabella Ferrua (ITA) | 131
18 | Diana Tonteva (RUS) | 143
31 | Afsanaeh Shafieialavueh (IRI) | 134
34 | Lee Wan Yi (HKG) | 133

Round of 32
7 | Alexandra Laury Blazek (USA) | 138
39 | Lee Ting-hsuan (TPE) | 135
23 | Abril Trinidad Lopez Benitez (MEX) | 139
10 | Fatin Nurfateha Mat Salleh (MAS) | 141
15 | Wu Ting-ting (TPE) | 143
18 | Diana Tonteva (RUS) | 137
31 | Afsanaeh Shafieialavueh (IRI) | 136
2 | Yeşim Bostan (TUR) | 141

Round of 16
7 | Alexandra Laury Blazek (USA) | 141
10 | Fatin Nurfateha Mat Salleh (MAS) | 142
15 | Wu Ting-ting (TPE) | 138
2 | Yeşim Bostan (TUR) | 141

Quarterfinal
10 | Fatin Nurfateha Mat Salleh (MAS) | 137
2 | Yeşim Bostan (TUR) | 145

=== Finals ===
Semifinals
1 | So Chae-won (KOR) | 130
4 | Song Yun-soo (KOR) | 143
14 | Chen Yi-hsuan (TPE) | 142 (TX)
2 | Yeşim Bostan (TUR) | 142 (T8)

Final
4 | Song Yun-soo (KOR) | 146
14 | Chen Yi-hsuan (TPE) | 143
Bronze Medal
1 | So Chae-won (KOR) | 144
2 | Yeşim Bostan (TUR) | 141
