= Archery at the 2017 Summer Universiade – Mixed team compound =

Mixed compound team at the XXIX Summer Universiade
- Venues: National Taiwan Sport University Stadium
- Dates: August 20, 2017 – August 23, 2017
- Competitors: 40 from 20 nations

Medalists
1st place, gold medalist(s)		Kim Jong-ho; So Chae-won	South Korea
2nd place, silver medalist(s)		Demir Elmaağaçlı; Yeşim Bostan	Turkey
3rd place, bronze medalist(s)		Chen Hsiang-hsuan; Chen Yi-hsuan	Chinese Taipei

The mixed team compound archery competition at the 2017 Summer Universiade was held in the National Taiwan Sport University Stadium, Taipei, Taiwan between August 20 and the finals between August 22–23, 2017.

== Records ==
Prior to the competition, the world and Universiade records were as follows.

- 144 arrows ranking round

Category	Team	Athlete	Score	Record	Date	Place	Event
Universiade record	South Korea	Kim Jong-ho	705	1397	4 July 2015	Gwangju, South Korea	2015 Summer Universiade
Universiade record	South Korea	Song Yun-soo	692	1397	4 July 2015	Gwangju, South Korea	2015 Summer Universiade

- 16 arrows final match

Category	Team	Athlete	Record	Date	Place	Event
World record	Italy	Marcella Tonioli	160(6)	14 June 2016	Antalya, Turkey	2011 World Archery Championships
World record	Italy	Steve Anderson	160(6)	14 June 2016	Antalya, Turkey	2011 World Archery Championships
Universiade record	South Korea	Kim Jong-ho	157	6 July 2015	Gwangju, South Korea	2015 Summer Universiade
Universiade record	South Korea	Song Yun-soo	157	6 July 2015	Gwangju, South Korea	2015 Summer Universiade

== Ranking round ==
Rank	Team	Archer	Individual			Team			Notes
Rank	Team	Archer	Score	10s	Xs	Total	10s	Xs	Notes
1	South Korea	Kim Jong-ho	698	51	24	1387	93	40	Q
1	South Korea	So Chae-won	689	42	16	1387	93	40	Q
2	Mexico	Rodolfo Gonzalez de Alba	696	52	24	1384	96	45	Q
2	Mexico	Fernanda Alexis Zepeda Preciado	688	44	21	1384	96	45	Q
3	Turkey	Demir Elmaağaçlı	694	48	17	1383	89	36	Q
3	Turkey	Yeşim Bostan	689	41	19	1383	89	36	Q
4	Chinese Taipei	Chen Hsiang-hsuan	695	48	20	1373	84	34	Q
4	Chinese Taipei	Chen Yi-hsuan	678	36	14	1373	84	34	Q
5	Iran	Yaser Amouei	689	43	11	1371	81	25	Q
5	Iran	Fereshteh Ghorbani	682	38	14	1371	81	25	Q
6	United States	Paeton Jacob Keller	687	45	20	1370	85	36	Q
6	United States	Alexandra Laury Blazek	683	40	16	1370	85	36	Q
7	India	Lovejot Singh	690	47	16	1370	85	28	Q
7	India	Snehel Vishnu Mandhare	680	38	12	1370	85	28	Q
8	Russia	Anton Bulaev	693	49	23	1367	80	33	Q
8	Russia	Diana Tonteva	674	31	10	1367	80	33	Q
9	Malaysia	Mohd Hakhiki Mohd Kamro	685	43	18	1366	84	30	Q
9	Malaysia	Fatin Nurfateha Mat Salleh	681	41	12	1366	84	30	Q
10	Indonesia	Yoke Rizaldi Akbar	686	43	13	1360	76	22	Q
10	Indonesia	Sri Ranti	674	33	9	1360	76	22	Q
11	Poland	Łukasz Slawomir Przybylski	679	34	10	1351	67	22	Q
11	Poland	Mariya Shkolna	672	33	12	1351	67	22	Q
12	Kazakhstan	Akbarali Karabayev	686	40	20	1346	67	32	Q
12	Kazakhstan	Nina Dudareva	660	27	12	1346	67	32	Q
13	Great Britain	Andrew Arledge Brooks	662	29	10	1345	70	20	Q
13	Great Britain	Hope Lauren Greenwood	683	41	10	1345	70	20	Q
14	Germany	Julian Alexande Scriba	675	35	12	1344	69	24	Q
14	Germany	Janine Meissner	669	34	12	1344	69	24	Q
15	Singapore	Ang Han Teng	683	42	16	1339	68	22	Q
15	Singapore	Loh Tze Chieh Conte	656	26	6	1339	68	22	Q
16	Ukraine	Roman Hoviadovskyi	683	43	12	1332	65	18	Q
16	Ukraine	Olena Borysenko	649	22	6	1332	65	18	Q
17	Italy	Viviano Mior	681	37	14	1321	62	27	
17	Italy	Isabella Ferrua	640	25	13	1321	62	27	
18	New Zealand	Samuel Alexander Hudson	650	21	5	1316	51	15	
18	New Zealand	Elizabeth Mary Randle	666	30	10	1316	51	15	
19	Argentina	Santiago Nicola Regnasco	662	31	12	1288	44	15	
19	Argentina	Melissa Agustin Regnasco	626	13	3	1288	44	15	
20	Hong Kong	Sze Sing Yu	622	12	5	1283	43	14	
20	Hong Kong	Lee Wan Yi	661	31	9	1283	43	14	

== Elimination round ==
Round of 16
1	South Korea	155
16	Ukraine	142
9	Malaysia	146
8	Russia	151
5	Iran	151
12	Kazakhstan	145
13	Great Britain	146
4	Chinese Taipei	150
3	Turkey	151
14	Germany	138
11	Poland	148
6	United States	146
7	India	149
10	Indonesia	147
15	Singapore	140
2	Mexico	149

Quarterfinals
1	South Korea	154
8	Russia	148
5	Iran	146
4	Chinese Taipei	148
3	Turkey	155
11	Poland	144
7	India	152
2	Mexico	147

Semifinals
1	South Korea	153
4	Chinese Taipei	151
3	Turkey	157
7	India	144

Final
1	South Korea	157
3	Turkey	153

=== Bronze medal ===
Bronze medal
4	Chinese Taipei	156
7	India	150
