= Archery at the 2017 Summer Universiade =

Archery at the XXIX Summer Universiade
- Venues: National Taiwan Sport University Stadium
- Dates: August 20, 2017 – August 24, 2017
- Competitors: 237 from 39 nations

Archery was contested at the 2017 Summer Universiade from August 20 to 24 at the National Taiwan Sport University Stadium in Taoyuan, Taiwan.

== Participant nations ==
237 archers from 39 nations participated at the 2017 Summer Universiade.

- Argentina (4)
- Belgium (1)
- Chinese Taipei (12)
- Croatia (1)
- Czech Republic (4)
- Estonia (6)
- Finland (3)
- France (6)
- Germany (6)
- Great Britain (6)
- Hong Kong (5)
- Hungary (1)
- India (12)
- Indonesia (6)
- Iran (6)
- Iraq (2)
- Israel (1)
- Italy (12)
- Japan (6)
- Kazakhstan (12)
- Liechtenstein (2)
- Malaysia (12)
- Mexico (12)
- Moldova (2)
- Netherlands (2)
- Norway (3)
- New Zealand (2)
- Philippines (6)
- Poland (4)
- Russia (12)
- Singapore (12)
- Slovakia (2)
- Slovenia (3)
- South Korea (12)
- Sweden (4)
- Switzerland (2)
- Turkey (6)
- Ukraine (11)
- United States (12)

== Medal summary ==
=== Medal table ===
Rank	Nation	Gold	Silver	Bronze	Total
1	South Korea	9	0	3	12
2	Russia	1	2	2	5
3	Chinese Taipei*	0	4	1	5
4	Turkey	0	2	1	3
5	France	0	1	0	1
5	Iran	0	1	0	1
7	Mexico	0	0	2	2
8	Croatia	0	0	1	1
Totals (8 entries)		10	10	10	30

=== Recurve ===
Event	Gold	Silver	Bronze
Men's individual	Lee Seung-yun; South Korea	Arsalan Baldanov; Russia	Kim Woo-jin; South Korea
Men's team	South Korea (KOR); Kim Woo-jin; Lee Seung-yun; Lee Woo-seok	Chinese Taipei (TPE); Deng Yu-cheng; Peng Shih-cheng; Wei Chun-heng	Russia (RUS); Arsalan Baldanov; Galsan Bazarzhapov; Artem Makhnenko
Women's individual	Kang Chae-young; South Korea	Tan Ya-ting; Chinese Taipei	Alejandra Valencia; Mexico
Women's team	South Korea (KOR); Choi Mi-sun; Kang Chae-young; Lee Eun-gyeong	Chinese Taipei (TPE); Le Chien-ying; Peng Chia-mao; Tan Ya-ting	Russia (RUS); Tuyana Dashidorzhieva; Elena Osipova; Sayana Tsyrempilova
Mixed team	South Korea (KOR); Choi Mi-sun; Lee Seung-yun	France (FRA); Audrey Adiceom; Mathieu Jiménez	Mexico (MEX); Jorge Nevarez; Alejandra Valencia

=== Compound ===
Event	Gold	Silver	Bronze
Men's individual	Kim Jong-ho; South Korea	Demir Elmaağaçlı; Turkey	Mario Vavro; Croatia
Men's team	Russia (RUS); Anton Bulaev; Alexander Dambaev; Victor Kalashnikov	Iran (IRI); Yaser Amouei; Milad Rashidi; Omid Taheri	South Korea (KOR); Hong Sung-ho; Kim Jong-ho; Kim Tae-yoon
Women's individual	Song Yun-soo; South Korea	Chen Yi-hsuan; Chinese Taipei	So Chae-won; South Korea
Women's team	South Korea (KOR); Kim Yun-hee; So Chae-won; Song Yun-soo	Russia (RUS); Aleksandra Savenkova; Diana Tontoeva; Maria Vinogradova	Turkey (TUR); Yeşim Bostan; Cansu Ecem Coşkun; Gizem Elmaağaçlı
Mixed team	South Korea (KOR); Kim Jong-ho; So Chae-won	Turkey (TUR); Demir Elmaagacli; Yeşim Bostan	Chinese Taipei (TPE); Chen Hsiang-hsuan; Chen Yi-hsuan
