= 2017 World Archery Youth Championships =

- Location: Rosario, Argentina
- Start date: 2 October 2017
- End date: 8 October 2017
- Competitors: 528 from 64 nations

The 2017 World Archery Youth Championships was the 15th edition of World Archery Youth Championships. The event was held in Rosario, Argentina 2-8 October 2017, and was organised by World Archery. Junior events were held for those under 20, and Cadet for those under 17.

== Medal summary ==
=== Junior ===
==== Recurve ====
| Event | Gold | Silver | Bronze |
|---|---|---|---|
| Men's individual | Jeong Tae-yeong; South Korea | Han Jae-yeop; South Korea | Ricardo Soto; Chile |
| Women's individual | Kim Kyoung-eun; South Korea | Kuo Ting-an; Chinese Taipei | Melanie Gaubil; France |
| Men's team | South Korea; Han Jae-yeop; Jeong Tae-yeong; Heo Jae-woo | India; Jemson Singh Ningthoujam; Shukmani Gajanan Babrekar; Atul Verma | Russia; Erdem Irdyneev; Alexey Krivolap; Erdem Tsydypov |
| Women's team | Italy; Vanessa Landi; Lucilla Boari; Tatiana Andreoli | China; Xu Zhiyun; Long Xiaoqing; Li Jiaman | Chinese Taipei; Ku Yun-Fei; Kuo Ting-An; Lin Chih-Yu |
| Mixed Team | India; Ankita Bhakat; Jemson Singh Ningthoujam | Russia; Svetlana Gomboeva; Erdem Irdyneev | Turkey; Mete Gazoz; Yasemin Anagöz |

==== Compound ====
| Event | Gold | Silver | Bronze |
|---|---|---|---|
| Men's individual | Curtis Broadnax; United States | Jesse Clayton; United States | Antonio Hidalgo Ibarra; Mexico |
| Women's individual | Alexis Ruiz; United States | Sarah Moon; United Kingdom | Gizem Elmaağaçlı; Turkey |
| Men's team | Mexico; Rodolfo Gonzalez; Jose Elizondo Del Bosque; Antonio Hidalgo Ibarra | Canada; Cole Beres; Jordan Adachi; Tristan Moran | United States; Curtis Broadnax; Jesse Clayton; Kolby Hanley |
| Women's team | Mexico; Fernanda Zepeda; Esmeralda Sanchez; Laura Perez Chavez | United Kingdom; Isabelle Carpenter; Phoebe Pine; Sarah Moon | United States; Cassidy Cox; Alexis Ruiz; Sophia Strachan |
| Mixed Team | United Kingdom; Sarah Moon; James Howse | United States; Alexis Ruiz; Jesse Clayton | Colombia; Nora Valdez; Sebastián Arenas |

=== Cadet ===
==== Recurve ====
| Event | Gold | Silver | Bronze |
|---|---|---|---|
| Men's individual | Tang Chih-chun; Chinese Taipei | Yong Hyeok-jung; South Korea | Kim Pil-joong; South Korea |
| Women's individual | Park So-hui; South Korea | Kyla Touraine-Helias; France | Zhang Mengyao; China |
| Men's team | United States; Andrew Park; Adam Heidt; Jack Williams | Chinese Taipei; Sung Hao-kai; Li Yen-yu; Tang Chih-chun | Japan; Testuya Aoshima; Mau Tateno; Daisuke Tomatsu |
| Women's team | Japan; Ruka Uehara; Yuri Tarumoto; Kanae Sueki | Russia; Tuiana Budazhapova; Ekaterina Biriukova; Viktoria Kharitonova | Great Britain; Louisa Piper; Thea Rogers; Alyssia Tromans-Ansell |
| Mixed Team | Chinese Taipei; Su Szu-ping; Tang Chih-chun | South Korea; An San; Kim Pil-joong | France; Lou Thirion; Lisa Barbelin |

==== Compound ====
| Event | Gold | Silver | Bronze |
|---|---|---|---|
| Men's individual | Bryan Alvarado Fernandez; Puerto Rico | Ethan Merrill; United States | Edgar Diaz; Mexico |
| Women's individual | Lucy Mason; United Kingdom | Alexandra Paquette; Canada | Geesa Bybordy; Iran |
| Men's team | United States; Anthony Ferraro; Ethan Merrill; Dane Johnson | Turkey; Emircan Haney; Gökhan Demirbaş; Bünyamin Yankaç | Mexico; Miguel Becerra; Edgar Diaz; Garcia Sebastian |
| Women's team | Mexico; Andrea Becerra; Sophia Sanfelice; Maria Garza Espinosa | United States; Sachiko Keane; Savannah Vanderwier; Breanna Theodore | India; Divya Dhayal; Khushbu Dhayal; Sanchita Tiwari |
| Mixed Team | Turkey; Dilara Sevindik; Emircan Haney | Mexico; Andrea Becerra; Edgar Diaz | United States; Sachiko Keane; Dane Johnson |

=== Medal table ===
| Rank | Nation | Gold | Silver | Bronze | Total |
|---|---|---|---|---|---|
| 1 | United States | 4 | 4 | 3 | 11 |
| 2 | South Korea | 4 | 3 | 1 | 8 |
| 3 | Mexico | 3 | 1 | 3 | 7 |
| 4 | Chinese Taipei | 2 | 2 | 1 | 5 |
| 4 | Great Britain | 2 | 2 | 1 | 5 |
| 6 | Turkey | 1 | 1 | 2 | 4 |
| 7 | India | 1 | 1 | 1 | 3 |
| 8 | Japan | 1 | 0 | 1 | 2 |
| 9 | Italy | 1 | 0 | 0 | 1 |
| 9 | Puerto Rico | 1 | 0 | 0 | 1 |
| 11 | Russia | 0 | 2 | 1 | 3 |
| 12 | Canada | 0 | 2 | 0 | 2 |
| 13 | France | 0 | 1 | 2 | 3 |
| 14 | China | 0 | 1 | 1 | 2 |
| 15 | Chile | 0 | 0 | 1 | 1 |
| 15 | Colombia | 0 | 0 | 1 | 1 |
| 15 | Iran | 0 | 0 | 1 | 1 |
| Totals (17 entries) | | 20 | 20 | 20 | 60 |
