= 2017 World Archery Championships =

- Location: Mexico City, Mexico
- Start date: 15 October
- End date: 22 October
- Competitors: 373 from 58 nations

2017 World Archery Championships
Men	Recurve	Compound
Women	Recurve	Compound
Team	Men's recurve	Men's compound
Team	Women's recurve	Women's compound
Mixed team	Recurve	Compound

The 2017 World Archery Championships was the 49th edition of the event. It was held in Mexico City, Mexico from 15 to 22 October 2017 and was organised by World Archery Federation (formerly known as FITA). Qualification and elimination rounds took place at the Campo Marte. The competition was preceded by the World Archery Federation Congress on 13–14 October.

The programme featured was the same as previous World Championships, with individual, team, and mixed team events in the compound and recurve disciplines.

== Schedule ==
All times are local (UTC+01:00).

Date	Time	Discipline	Phase
15 Oct	09:00	All	Official practice
16 Oct	09:00	CM / CW	Qualification
16 Oct	13:30	RM	Qualification
17 Oct	09:00	RW	Qualification
17 Oct	14:00	RMT / RWT	Team eliminations
18 Oct	09:00	RM / RW	Individual eliminations
18 Oct	13:30	CM / CW	Individual eliminations
19 Oct	09:00	RM / RW / CM / CW	Individual eliminations / QF / SF
19 Oct	14:00	CMT / CWT	Team eliminations
20 Oct	09:00	CXT / RXT	Mixed Team eliminations
21 Oct	11:00	CMT / CWT	Medal matches
21 Oct	15:00	CXT / CM / CW	Medal matches
22 Oct	11:00	RMT / RWT	Medal matches
22 Oct	15:00	RXT / RM / RW	Medal matches

== Medals table ==
* Host nation (Mexico)

Rank	Nation	Gold	Silver	Bronze	Total
1	South Korea	5	1	2	8
2	Italy	1	1	1	3
3	France	1	1	0	2
4	Colombia	1	0	1	2
4	United States	1	0	1	2
6	Russia	1	0	0	1
7	Germany	0	2	1	3
8	Chinese Taipei	0	1	2	3
9	Denmark	0	1	0	1
9	India	0	1	0	1
9	Mexico*	0	1	0	1
9	Turkey	0	1	0	1
13	Great Britain	0	0	1	1
13	Netherlands	0	0	1	1
Totals (14 entries)		10	10	10	30

== Medals summary ==
=== Recurve ===
Event	Gold	Silver	Bronze
Men's individual	Im Dong-hyun; South Korea	Wei Chun-heng; Chinese Taipei	Steve Wijler; Netherlands
Women's individual	Ksenia Perova; Russia	Chang Hye-jin; South Korea	Tan Ya-ting; Chinese Taipei
Men's team	Italy; Marco Galiazzo; Mauro Nespoli; David Pasqualucci	France; Thomas Chirault; Pierre Plihon; Jean-Charles Valladont	South Korea; Im Dong-hyun; Kim Woo-jin; Oh Jin-hyek
Women's team	South Korea; Chang Hye-jin; Choi Mi-sun; Kang Chae-young	Mexico; Mariana Avitia; Aída Román; Alejandra Valencia	Chinese Taipei; Lin Shih-chia; Lin Yu-hsuan; Tan Ya-ting
Mixed team	South Korea; Im Dong-hyun; Kang Chae-young	Germany; Florian Kahllund; Lisa Unruh	United Kingdom; Patrick Huston; Naomi Folkard

=== Compound ===
Event	Gold	Silver	Bronze
Men's individual	Sebastien Peineau; France	Stephan Hansen; Denmark	Braden Gellenthien; United States
Women's individual	Song Yun-soo; South Korea	Yeşim Bostan; Turkey	Kristina Heigenhauser; Germany
Men's team	United States; Steve Anderson; Braden Gellenthien; Kris Schaff	Italy; Sergio Pagni; Federico Pagnoni; Alberto Simonelli	Colombia; Sebastián Arenas; Camilo Cardona; Daniel Muñoz
Women's team	Colombia; Sara López; Alejandra Usquiano; Nora Valdez	India; Trisha Deb; Lily Chanu Paonam; Jyothi Surekha Vennam	South Korea; Choi Bo-min; So Chae-won; Song Yun-soo
Mixed team	South Korea; Kim Jong-ho; Song Yun-soo	Germany; Marcel Trachsel; Kristina Heigenhauser	Italy; Sergio Pagni; Irene Franchini

== Participating nations ==
At the close of registrations, a 58 nations had registered 373 athletes. Nations in bold sent the maximum number of participants, with a full team in each event.

- Argentina (7)
- Australia (7)
- Austria (6)
- Belgium (7)
- Bhutan (4)
- Brazil (7)
- Canada (10)
- Chile (4)
- China (6)
- **Chinese Taipei (12)**
- **Colombia (12)**
- Costa Rica (3)
- Croatia (6)
- Cuba (4)
- Czech Republic (5)
- **Denmark (12)**
- Dominican Republic (3)
- Egypt (1)
- El Salvador (6)
- Estonia (3)
- Finland (3)
- **France (12)**
- Faroe Islands (3)
- Georgia (3)
- **Germany (12)**
- Guatemala (7)
- Hungary (2)
- Iceland (6)
- **India (12)**
- **Italy (12)**
- Japan (8)
- Kazakhstan (6)
- **South Korea (12)**
- Latvia (1)
- Lithuania (6)
- Luxembourg (2)
- **Malaysia (12)**
- **Mexico (12) (host)**
- Moldova (2)
- Netherlands (9)
- New Zealand (1)
- Norway (5)
- Philippines (4)
- Poland (7)
- Portugal (1)
- Puerto Rico (2)
- Romania (2)
- **Russia (12)**
- Saudi Arabia (3)
- Slovakia (1)
- Slovenia (6)
- South Africa (6)
- Spain (10)
- Switzerland (5)
- **Turkey (12)**
- Ukraine (6)
- United Kingdom (11)
- **United States (12)**
