= Archery at the 2017 Summer Universiade – Men's team compound =

Men's compound team at the XXIX Summer Universiade
- Venues: National Taiwan Sport University Stadium
- Dates: August 20, 2017 – August 23, 2017
- Competitors: 54 from 18 nations

Medalists
1st place, gold medalist(s)		Anton Bulaev; Alexander Dambaev; Victor Kalashnikov	Russia
2nd place, silver medalist(s)		Yaser Amouei; Milad Rashidi; Omid Taheri	Iran
3rd place, bronze medalist(s)		Kim Jong-ho; Kim Tae-yoon; Hong Sung-ho	South Korea

The men's team compound archery competition at the 2017 Summer Universiade was held in the National Taiwan Sport University Stadium, Taipei, Taiwan between August 20 and the finals between August 22–23, 2017.

== Records ==
Prior to the competition, the world and Universiade records were as follows.

- 216 arrows ranking round

Category	Team	Athlete	Score	Record	Date	Place	Event
World record	United States	Alex Wifler	712	2133	27 April 2016	Shanghai, China	2016 Archery World Cup
World record	United States	Steve Anderson	711	2133	27 April 2016	Shanghai, China	2016 Archery World Cup
World record	United States	Reo Wilde	710	2133	27 April 2016	Shanghai, China	2016 Archery World Cup
Universiade record	South Korea	Kim Jong-ho	705	2102	4 July 2015	Gwangju, South Korea	2015 Summer Universiade
Universiade record	South Korea	Kim Tae-yoon	702	2102	4 July 2015	Gwangju, South Korea	2015 Summer Universiade
Universiade record	South Korea	Yang Yong-ho	695	2102	4 July 2015	Gwangju, South Korea	2015 Summer Universiade

- 24 arrows final match

Category	Team	Athlete	Record	Date	Place	Event
World record	United States	Reo Wilde	239	6 July 2011	Turin, Italy	2011 World Archery Championships
World record	United States	Braden Gellenthien	239	6 July 2011	Turin, Italy	2011 World Archery Championships
World record	United States	Jesse Broadwater	239	6 July 2011	Turin, Italy	2011 World Archery Championships
Universiade record	South Korea	Kim Jong-ho	237	7 July 2015	Gwangju, South Korea	2015 Summer Universiade
Universiade record	South Korea	Kim Tae-yoon	237	7 July 2015	Gwangju, South Korea	2015 Summer Universiade
Universiade record	South Korea	Yang Yong-ho	237	7 July 2015	Gwangju, South Korea	2015 Summer Universiade

== Ranking round ==
Rank	Team	Archer	Individual			Team			Notes
Rank	Team	Archer	Score	10s	Xs	Total	10s	Xs	Notes
1	South Korea	Kim Jong-ho	698	51	24	2088	149	67	Q
1	South Korea	Kim Tae-yoon	697	52	23	2088	149	67	Q
1	South Korea	Hong Sung-ho	693	46	20	2088	149	67	Q
2	Russia	Anton Bulaev	693	49	23	2071	137	58	Q
2	Russia	Alexander Dambaev	690	43	17	2071	137	58	Q
2	Russia	Victor Kalashnikov	688	45	18	2071	137	58	Q
3	Mexico	Rodolfo Gonzalez de Alba	696	52	24	2066	135	61	Q
3	Mexico	Antonio Hidalgo Ibarra	686	41	19	2066	135	61	Q
3	Mexico	Adolfo Medina Landeros	684	42	18	2066	135	61	Q
4	Turkey	Demir Elmaağaçlı	694	48	17	2064	130	51	Q
4	Turkey	Evren Çağıran	687	42	22	2064	130	51	Q
4	Turkey	Emre Çömez	683	40	12	2064	130	51	Q
5	Iran	Yaser Amouei	689	43	11	2062	126	49	Q
5	Iran	Milad Rashidi	687	41	16	2062	126	49	Q
5	Iran	Omid Taheri	686	42	22	2062	126	49	Q
6	Chinese Taipei	Chen Hsiang-hsuan	695	48	20	2061	133	60	Q
6	Chinese Taipei	Lin Che-wei	687	42	22	2061	133	60	Q
6	Chinese Taipei	Lin Hsin-min	683	40	12	2061	133	60	Q
7	India	Lovejot Singh	690	47	16	2054	123	38	Q
7	India	Amanjeet Singh	686	42	12	2054	123	38	Q
7	India	Aman	678	34	10	2054	123	38	Q
8	United States	Paeton Jacob Keller	687	45	20	2036	117	57	Q
8	United States	Christopher Lin Bee	676	34	18	2036	117	57	Q
8	United States	Adam Brown Winey	673	38	19	2036	117	57	Q
9	Ukraine	Roman Hoviadovskyi	683	43	12	2031	110	31	Q
9	Ukraine	Oleh Piven	676	39	13	2031	110	31	Q
9	Ukraine	Igor Kardash	672	28	6	2031	110	31	Q
10	Indonesia	Yoke Rizaldi Akbar	686	43	13	2030	108	38	Q
10	Indonesia	Sri Ranti ^{1}	674	33	9	2030	108	38	Q
10	Indonesia	Tiara Sakti Ramadhani ^{1}	670	32	16	2030	108	38	Q
11	Kazakhstan	Akbarali Karabayev	686	40	20	2024	105	42	Q
11	Kazakhstan	Pavel Fisher	681	39	16	2024	105	42	Q
11	Kazakhstan	Nur Ybrayev	657	26	6	2024	105	42	Q
12	Germany	Julian Alexande Scriba	675	35	12	2017	101	39	Q
12	Germany	Paul Leon Hollas	673	32	15	2017	101	39	Q
12	Germany	Janine Meissner ^{1}	669	34	12	2017	101	39	Q
13	Italy	Viviano Mior	681	37	14	2016	96	31	Q
13	Italy	Jacopo Polidori	670	28	10	2016	96	31	Q
13	Italy	Gianluca Ruggiero	665	31	7	2016	96	31	Q
14	Singapore	Ang Han Teng	683	42	16	2012	99	34	Q
14	Singapore	Tay Han Yueh Shawn	679	36	11	2012	99	34	Q
14	Singapore	Jun Jie Kenji Chong	650	21	7	2012	99	34	Q
15	Malaysia	Mohd Hakhiki Mohd Kamro	685	43	18	2005	95	31	Q
15	Malaysia	Mohamad Firdaus Ishak	665	27	6	2005	95	31	Q
15	Malaysia	Amirul Amin Abd Rahim	655	25	7	2005	95	31	Q
16	Great Britain	Hope Lauren Greenwood ^{1}	683	41	10	2003	93	27	Q
16	Great Britain	Andrew Arledge Brooks	662	29	10	2003	93	27	Q
16	Great Britain	Rebecca Nicole Blewett ^{1}	658	23	7	2003	93	27	Q
17	Argentina	Santiago Nicola Regnasco	662	31	12	1954	85	30	
17	Argentina	Luis Fernando Aguirre Oviedo	654	29	9	1954	85	30	
17	Argentina	Juan Ignacio De Martini	638	25	9	1954	85	30	
18	Hong Kong	Lee Wan Yi ^{1}	661	31	9	1921	65	25	
18	Hong Kong	Lam Claudia Wing Tung ^{1}	638	22	11	1921	65	25	
18	Hong Kong	Sze Sing Yu	622	12	5	1921	65	25	

- ^1: Female competitor.

== Elimination rounds ==
Round of 16
1	South Korea	220
16	Great Britain	185
9	Ukraine	195
8	United States	202
5	Iran	213
12	Germany	203
13	Italy	187
4	Turkey	204
3	Mexico	211
14	Singapore	198
11	Kazakhstan	209
6	Chinese Taipei	221
7	India	212
10	Indonesia	217
15	Malaysia	207
2	Russia	215

Quarterfinals
1	South Korea	225
8	United States	212
5	Iran	223
4	Turkey	217
3	Mexico	229
6	Chinese Taipei	214
10	Indonesia	213
2	Russia	223

Semifinals
1	South Korea	222 (T28)
5	Iran	222 (T29)
3	Mexico	214
2	Russia	222

Final
5	Iran	227
2	Russia	232

=== Bronze medal ===
Bronze medal
1	South Korea	235
3	Mexico	223
