= Archery at the 2017 Summer Universiade – Women's team compound =

Women's compound team at the XXIX Summer Universiade
- Venues: National Taiwan Sport University Stadium
- Dates: August 20, 2017 – August 23, 2017
- Competitors: 54 from 18 nations

Medalists
1st place, gold medalist(s)		So Chae-won; Song Yun-soo; Kim Yun-hee	South Korea
2nd place, silver medalist(s)		Diana Tonteva; Marila Vinogradova; Aleksandra Savenkova	Russia
3rd place, bronze medalist(s)		Yeşim Bostan; Gizem Elmaağaçlı; Ecem Cansu Coşkun	Turkey

The women's team compound archery competition at the 2017 Summer Universiade was held in the National Taiwan Sport University Stadium, Taipei, Taiwan between August 20 and the finals between August 22–23, 2017.

== Records ==
Prior to the competition, the world and Universiade records were as follows.

- 216 arrows ranking round

Category	Team	Athlete	Score	Record	Date	Place	Event
World record	United States	Jamie Van Natta	703	2095	7 September 2011	Shanghai, China	2011 Archery World Cup
World record	United States	Christie Colin	698	2095	7 September 2011	Shanghai, China	2011 Archery World Cup
World record	United States	Diane Watson	694	2095	7 September 2011	Shanghai, China	2011 Archery World Cup
Universiade record	South Korea	Song Yun-soo	692	2060	4 July 2015	Gwangju, South Korea	2015 Summer Universiade
Universiade record	South Korea	Kim Yun-hee	687	2060	4 July 2015	Gwangju, South Korea	2015 Summer Universiade
Universiade record	South Korea	Seol Da-yeong	681	2060	4 July 2015	Gwangju, South Korea	2015 Summer Universiade

- 24 arrows final match

Category	Team	Athlete	Record	Date	Place	Event
World record	South Korea	Choi Bo-min	238	25 September 2014	Incheon, South Korea	2014 Asian Games
World record	South Korea	Kim Yun-hee	238	25 September 2014	Incheon, South Korea	2014 Asian Games
World record	South Korea	Seok Ji-hyun	238	25 September 2014	Incheon, South Korea	2014 Asian Games
Universiade record	United States	Mackenize Kieborz	234	7 July 2015	Gwangju, South Korea	2015 Summer Universiade
Universiade record	United States	Borgan Williams	234	7 July 2015	Gwangju, South Korea	2015 Summer Universiade
Universiade record	United States	Carli Cochran	234	7 July 2015	Gwangju, South Korea	2015 Summer Universiade

== Ranking Round ==
Rank	Team	Archer	Individual			Team			Notes
Rank	Team	Archer	Score	10s	Xs	Total	10s	Xs	Notes
1	South Korea	So Chae-won	689	42	16	2048	115	35	Q
1	South Korea	Song Yun-soo	686	39	10	2048	115	35	Q
1	South Korea	Kim Yun-hee	673	34	9	2048	115	35	Q
2	Turkey	Yeşim Bostan	689	41	19	2040	113	43	Q
2	Turkey	Gizem Elmaağaçlı	684	41	18	2040	113	43	Q
2	Turkey	Ecem Cansu Coşkun	667	31	6	2040	113	43	Q
3	Mexico	Fernanda Alexis Zepeda Preciado	688	44	21	2038	115	47	Q
3	Mexico	Brenda Merino Escudero	680	37	15	2038	115	47	Q
3	Mexico	Abril Trinidad Lopez Benitez	670	34	11	2038	115	47	Q
4	India	Snehel Vishnu Mandhare	680	38	12	2026	107	33	Q
4	India	Jyothi Surekha Vennam	676	36	11	2026	107	33	Q
4	India	Prabhjot Kaur	670	33	10	2026	107	33	Q
5	United States	Alexandra Laury Blazek	683	40	16	2019	103	41	Q
5	United States	Sophia Walden Strachen	673	33	12	2019	103	41	Q
5	United States	Isabella Maria Bastiani	663	30	13	2019	103	41	Q
6	Russia	Diana Tonteva	674	31	10	2016	95	35	Q
6	Russia	Marila Vinogradova	673	31	15	2016	95	35	Q
6	Russia	Aleksandra Savenkova	669	33	10	2016	95	35	Q
7	Chinese Taipei	Chen Yi-hsuan	678	36	14	2012	101	40	Q
7	Chinese Taipei	Wu Ting-ting	677	36	15	2012	101	40	Q
7	Chinese Taipei	Lee Ting-hsuan	357	29	11	2012	101	40	Q
8	Malaysia	Fatin Nurfateha Mat Salleh	681	41	12	2009	93	28	Q
8	Malaysia	Nurul Syazhera Mohd Asmi	664	28	12	2009	93	28	Q
8	Malaysia	Iman Aisyah Norazam	664	24	4	2009	93	28	Q
9	Iran	Fereshteh Ghorbani	682	38	14	2004	94	32	Q
9	Iran	Afsanaeh Shafieialavueh	664	28	11	2004	94	32	Q
9	Iran	Shiva Bakhtiari	658	28	7	2004	94	32	Q
10	Kazakhstan	Nina Dudareva	660	27	12	1960	67	23	Q
10	Kazakhstan	Diana Makarchuk	658	29	8	1960	67	23	Q
10	Kazakhstan	Viktoriya Lyan	642	11	3	1960	67	23	Q
11	Singapore	Loh Tze Chieh Conte	656	26	6	1947	68	20	Q
11	Singapore	Christina Gunawan	649	23	8	1947	68	20	Q
11	Singapore	Madeleine Ong Xue Li	642	19	6	1947	68	20	Q
12	Italy	Isabella Ferrua	640	25	13	1858	54	21	Q
12	Italy	Ilaria Spanu	621	14	6	1858	54	21	Q
12	Italy	Matilde Pittarelli	597	15	2	1858	54	21	Q

== Elimination round ==
Round of 16
9	Iran	218
8	Malaysia	195
5	United States	215
12	Italy	189
11	Singapore	195
6	Russia	213
7	Chinese Taipei	205
10	Kazakhstan	219

Quarterfinals
1	South Korea	222
9	Iran	216
5	United States	198
4	India	203
3	Mexico	206
6	Russia	210
10	Kazakhstan	198
2	Turkey	208

Semifinals
1	South Korea	224
4	India	213
6	Russia	204
2	Turkey	197

Final
1	South Korea	232
6	Russia	229

=== Bronze medal ===
Bronze Medal
4	India	227
2	Turkey	228
