= Zheng Yichai =

Chinese archer (born 1998)

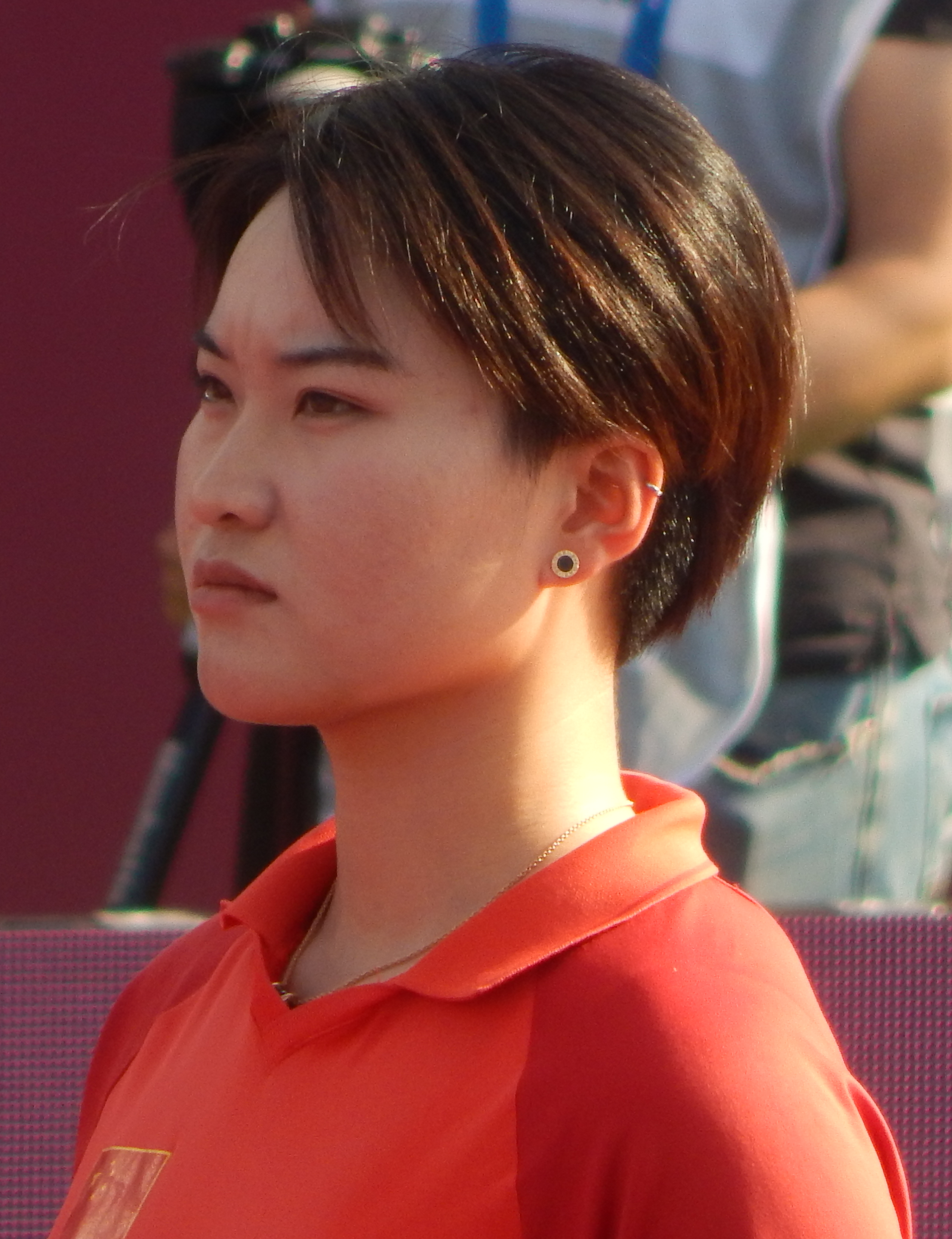
- Zheng Yichai in 2019

Personal information
- Born: 1 February 1998 (age 28)

Sport
- Country: China
- Sport: Archery
- Event: Recurve
Medal record
Women's recurve archery
Representing China
Asian Championships
Silver medal – second place	2019 Bangkok	Individual
Silver medal – second place	2019 Bangkok	Team
World Cup
Bronze medal – third place	2019 Moscow	Individual
Military World Games
Silver medal – second place	2019 Wuhan	Mixed team

Zheng Yichai (simplified Chinese: 郑怡钗; traditional Chinese: 鄭怡釵; pinyin: Zhèng Yíchāi, born 1 February 1998) is a Chinese archer. She won the silver medal in both the individual and the team event at the 2019 Asian Archery Championships held in Bangkok, Thailand.

In 2019, she won the silver medal in the mixed team event at the 2019 Military World Games held in Wuhan, China, alongside Feng Hao.
