= So Chae-won =

South Korean compound archer

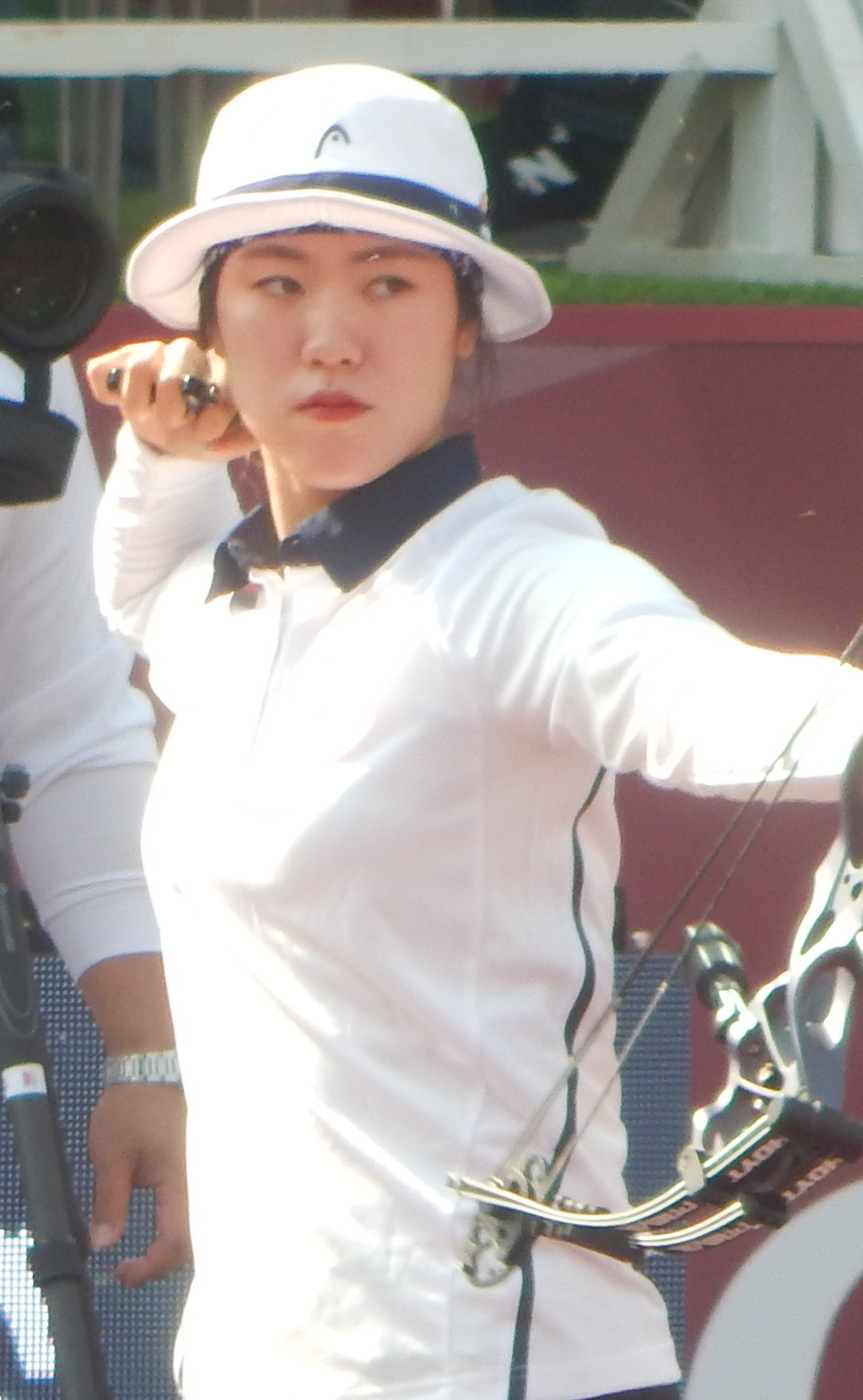
- 2019 Archery World Cup Final in Moscow. Women's compound.

Personal information
- Nationality: Korean
- Born: 12 November 1997 (age 28)

Korean name
- Hangul: 소채원
- RR: So Chaewon
- MR: So Ch'aewŏn

Sport
- Country: South Korea
- Sport: Archery
Medal record
Women's compound archery
Representing South Korea
World Championships
Bronze medal – third place	2017 Mexico City	Team
Bronze medal – third place	2023 Berlin	Team
Asian Games
Gold medal – first place	2018 Jakarta–Palembang	Team
Silver medal – second place	2018 Jakarta–Palembang	Mixed team
Asian Championships
Gold medal – first place	2017 Dhaka	Mixed team
Gold medal – first place	2019 Bangkok	Team
Silver medal – second place	2017 Dhaka	Team
Silver medal – second place	2019 Bangkok	Individual
Bronze medal – third place	2019 Bangkok	Mixed team
Bronze medal – third place	2023 Bangkok	Team
Bronze medal – third place	2023 Bangkok	Mixed team
Archery World Cup
Bronze medal – third place	2018 Samsun	Individual
Summer Universiade
Gold medal – first place	2017 Taipei	Team
Gold medal – first place	2017 Taipei	Mixed team
Gold medal – first place	2019 Naples	Team
Silver medal – second place	2019 Naples	Individual
Bronze medal – third place	2019 Naples	Mixed team
Bronze medal – third place	2017 Taipei	Individual

So Chae-won (Korean: 소채원; born 12 November 1997) is a South Korean compound archer.

== Career ==
In 2017, she won gold medals in the individual event and in the Mixed team event alongside Kim Jong-ho and a bronze medal in the Women's team event alongside Kim Yun-hee and Song Yun-soo at the Summer Universiade games. She also won a bronze medal at the 2017 World Archery Championships in the women's team event alongside Choi Bo-min and Song Yun-soo.

She participated in the 2018 Asian Games winning a gold medal in the women's team event alongside Choi Bo-min and Song Yun-soo and a silver medal in the mixed team event alongside Kim Jong-ho. She also won a bronze medal at the 2018 Archery World Cup final in the individual event.
