= Feng Hao =

Chinese archer (born 2001)

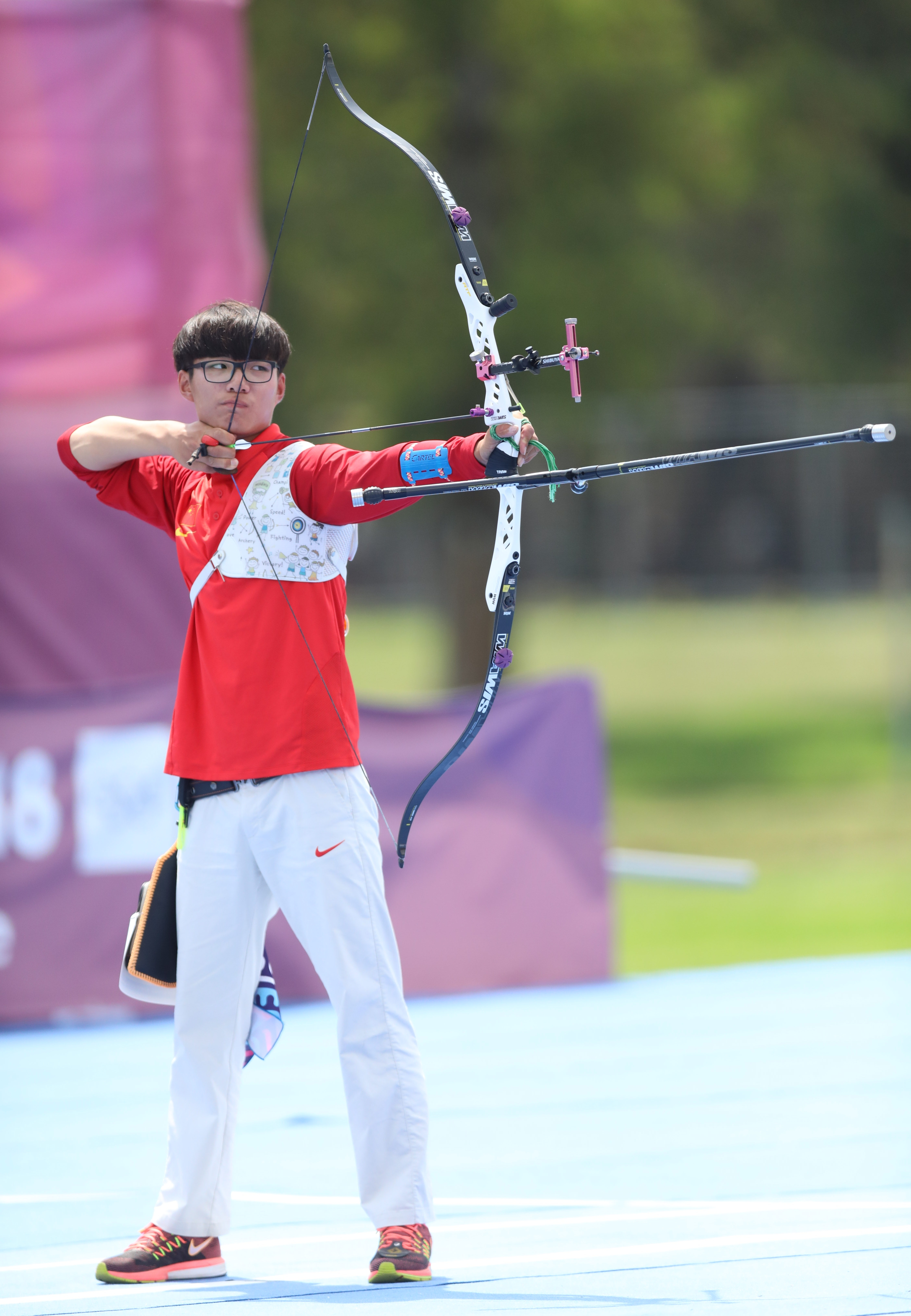
- Feng Hao in 2018

Personal information
- Born: 24 February 2001 (age 25)

Sport
- Country: China
- Sport: Archery
- Event: Recurve
Medal record
Men's recurve archery
Representing China
World Championships
Gold medal – first place	2019 's-Hertogenbosch	Team
Military World Games
Gold medal – first place	2019 Wuhan	Team
Silver medal – second place	2019 Wuhan	Mixed team
Archery World Cup
Gold medal – first place	2019 Antalya	Team

Feng Hao (born 24 February 2001) is a Chinese archer competing in men's recurve events. He won the gold medal in the men's team recurve event at the 2019 World Archery Championships held in 's-Hertogenbosch, Netherlands.

In 2018, he represented China at the Summer Youth Olympics in Buenos Aires, Argentina without winning a medal. In the boys' singles event he finished in 3rd place in the ranking round and he advanced to the elimination rounds. Here he won his first match against Wian Roux of South Africa but lost his next match against Ravien Dalpatadu of Sri Lanka. In the mixed team event he competed alongside Jil Walter of Samoa; they were eliminated in their first match in the elimination rounds.

In 2019, he won the gold medal in the men's team event at the Military World Games held in Wuhan, China. He also won the silver medal in the mixed team event, alongside Zheng Yichai.
