= Madhumita Kumari =

Indian archer

Personal information
- Nationality: Indian

Sport
- Country: India
- Sport: Archery
Medal record
Women's Archery
Representing India
Asian Games
Silver medal – second place	2018 Jakarta	Team compound

Madhumita Kumari is an Indian archer. She won the Silver Medal Asian Games 2018 in the Women's compound archery team event.
