= Archery at the 2018 Asian Games – Women's team compound =

Women's team compound at the 2018 Asian Games
- Venue: Gelora Bung Karno Archery Field
- Dates: 22–28 August 2018
- Competitors: 48 from 13 nations

Medalists
gold medal	South Korea; Choi Bo-min, So Chae-won, Song Yun-soo
silver medal	India; Muskan Kirar, Madhumita Kumari, Jyothi Surekha
bronze medal	Chinese Taipei; Chen Li-ju, Chen Yi-hsuan, Lin Ming-ching

The women's team compound archery competition at the 2018 Asian Games was held from 22 to 28 August at Gelora Bung Karno Archery Field.

A total of 13 teams participated in the ranking round to determine the seeds for knockout round. Each team consisted of the highest ranked three athletes from the qualification round.

== Schedule ==
All times are Western Indonesia Time (UTC+07:00)

Date	Time	Event
Wednesday, 22 August 2018	09:00	Ranking round
Sunday, 26 August 2018	10:00	1/8 eliminations
Sunday, 26 August 2018	12:25	Quarterfinals
Sunday, 26 August 2018	14:05	Semifinals
Tuesday, 28 August 2018	12:20	Bronze medal match
Tuesday, 28 August 2018	12:45	Gold medal match

== Results ==
=== Ranking round ===
Rank	Team	Half		Total	10s	Xs
Rank	Team	1st	2nd	Total	10s	Xs
1	South Korea (KOR)	1052	1053	2105	162	69
	Choi Bo-min	352	349	701	53	29
	Kim Yun-hee	~~349~~	~~350~~	~~699~~	~~51~~	~~21~~
	So Chae-won	350	353	703	56	20
	Song Yun-soo	350	351	701	53	20
2	India (IND)	1050	1035	2085	148	57
	Trisha Deb	~~341~~	~~342~~	~~683~~	~~38~~	~~23~~
	Muskan Kirar	350	341	691	45	21
	Madhumita Kumari	346	343	689	46	13
	Jyothi Surekha	354	351	705	57	23
3	Chinese Taipei (TPE)	1045	1040	2085	147	59
	Chen Li-ju	345	345	690	46	17
	Chen Yi-hsuan	354	352	706	58	26
	Huang I-jou	~~347~~	~~340~~	~~687~~	~~43~~	~~15~~
	Lin Ming-ching	346	343	689	43	16
4	Iran (IRI)	1030	1021	2051	123	49
	Minoo Abedi	343	339	682	42	16
	Parisa Baratchi	341	341	682	41	14
	Raheleh Farsi	~~345~~	~~335~~	~~680~~	~~37~~	~~11~~
	Fereshteh Ghorbani	346	341	687	40	19
5	Kazakhstan (KAZ)	1029	1020	2049	116	37
	Nina Dudareva	~~340~~	~~338~~	~~678~~	~~34~~	~~8~~
	Viktoriya Lyan	345	337	682	39	15
	Diana Makarchuk	341	340	681	37	9
	Adel Zhexenbinova	343	343	686	40	13
6	Malaysia (MAS)	1016	1027	2043	114	40
	Nurul Syazhera Asmi	~~330~~	~~332~~	~~662~~	~~30~~	~~12~~
	Saritha Cham Nong	336	341	677	36	11
	Fatin Nurfatehah Mat Salleh	345	349	694	48	19
	Sazatul Nadhirah Zakaria	335	337	672	30	10
7	Indonesia (INA)	1023	1019	2042	111	40
	Triya Resky Andriyani	~~334~~	~~339~~	~~673~~	~~33~~	~~7~~
	Yurike Nina Bonita	341	337	678	36	13
	Sri Ranti	340	341	681	38	14
	Dellie Threesyadinda	342	341	683	37	13
8	Vietnam (VIE)	1017	1013	2030	99	28
	Châu Kiều Oanh	342	336	678	36	10
	Lê Phương Thảo	337	339	676	31	10
	Nguyễn Thị Nhật Lệ	338	338	676	32	8
9	Thailand (THA)	1015	1010	2025	103	32
	Suvaporn Anutaraporn	333	333	666	30	8
	Nareumon Junsook	~~330~~	~~336~~	~~666~~	~~28~~	~~8~~
	Kanyavee Maneesombatkul	342	341	683	41	16
	Kodchaporn Pratumsuwan	340	336	676	32	8
10	Bangladesh (BAN)	1002	995	1997	93	32
	Bonna Akter	335	336	671	35	13
	Roksana Akter	338	334	672	32	10
	Suma Biswas	329	325	654	26	9
11	Myanmar (MYA)	1000	997	1997	87	27
	Hla Hla San	328	334	662	25	10
	Su Su Hlaing	338	329	667	30	6
	Yaw Sein Yah	334	334	668	32	11
12	Singapore (SGP)	978	989	1967	85	20
	Christina Gunawan	333	332	665	33	8
	Angeline Lee	~~308~~	~~296~~	~~604~~	~~12~~	~~4~~
	Contessa Loh	340	345	685	39	11
	Madeleine Ong	305	312	617	13	1
13	Mongolia (MGL)	947	938	1885	47	17
	Battsetsegiin Batdulam	332	306	638	20	8
	Erdenebatyn Enkhtamir	317	321	638	16	5
	Batjargalyn Möngönchimeg	298	311	609	11	4

=== Knockout round ===
1/8 eliminations
9	Thailand	222
8	Vietnam	210
5	Kazakhstan	225
12	Singapore	212
13	Mongolia	203
4	Iran	221
11	Myanmar	222
6	Malaysia	229
7	Indonesia	222
10	Bangladesh	208

Quarterfinals
1	South Korea	233
9	Thailand	226
5	Kazakhstan	217
4	Iran	224
3	Chinese Taipei	225
6	Malaysia	221
7	Indonesia	224
2	India	229

Semifinals
1	South Korea	231
4	Iran	228
3	Chinese Taipei	222
2	India	225

Gold medal match
1	South Korea	231
2	India	228
Bronze medal match
4	Iran	221
3	Chinese Taipei	226
