= 2019 European Indoor Archery Championships =

- Venue: İlkadim Archery Facilities
- Location: Turkey, Samsun
- Start date: 26 February
- End date: 2 March
- Competitors: 180 from 25 nations

The 2019 European Indoor Archery Championships was the 17th edition of the European Indoor Archery Championships. The event was held in Samsun, Turkey from February 26 to March 2, 2019.

== Medal table ==
* Host nation (Turkey)

Rank	Nation	Gold	Silver	Bronze	Total
1	Russia	5	3	7	15
2	Italy	3	4	0	7
3	Turkey*	3	3	3	9
4	Ukraine	2	3	2	7
5	France	1	2	0	3
6	Netherlands	1	0	1	2
7	Estonia	1	0	0	1
8	Georgia	0	1	0	1
9	Croatia	0	0	1	1
9	Denmark	0	0	1	1
9	Norway	0	0	1	1
Totals (11 entries)		16	16	16	48

== Medal summary ==
=== Recurve ===
Event	Gold	Silver	Bronze
Recurve Men	Massimiliano Mandia; Italy	Marco Morello; Italy	Erdem Tsydypov; Russia
Recurve Men Team	Russia; Arsalan Baldanov; Bolot Tsybzhitov; Erdem Tsydypov	Ukraine; Yuri Havelko; Vladyslav Lisniak; Viktor Ruban	Turkey; Mete Gazoz; Muhammed Güneri; Fatih Bozlar
Compound Men	Mike Schloesser; Netherlands	Adrien Gontier; France	Domagoj Buden; Croatia
Compound Men Team	France; Jean-Philippe Boulch; Pierre-Julien Deloche; Adrien Gontier	Italy; Valerio Della Stua; Fabio Ibba; Sergio Pagni	Netherlands; Peter Elzinga; Sil Pater; Mike Schloesser
Recurve Women	Sayana Tsyrempilova; Russia	Lidiya Sichenikova; Ukraine	Inna Stepanova; Russia
Recurve Women Team	Russia; Viktoriya Budayeva; Inna Stepanova; Sayana Tsyrempilova	Georgia; Kristine Esebua; Jatuna Narimanidze; Tsiko Phutkaradze	Ukraine; Anastasiya Pavlova; Polina Rodionova; Lidiya Sichenikova
Compound Women	Gizem Elmaağaçlı; Turkey	Alexandra Savenkova; Russia	Natalia Avdeyeva; Russia
Compound Women Team	Russia; Natalia Avdeyeva; Viktoriya Balzhanova; Alexandra Savenkova	Italy; Irene Franchini; Sara Ret; Marcella Tonioli	Turkey; Gizem Elmaağaçlı; Yeşim Bostan; Ezgi Gizem Altınçıbık

=== Juniors ===
Event	Gold	Silver	Bronze
Recurve Junior Men	Ivan Kozhokar; Ukraine	Igor Grigorenko; Russia	Sodnom Budaev; Russia
Recurve Junior Men Team	Turkey; Musa Arzuman; Erdal Meriç Dal; Efe Gürkan Maraş	Russia; Sodnom Budaev; Igor Grigorenko; Sanzhi Khaludorov	Italy; Federico Fabrizzi; Alessandro Paoli; Matteo Santi
Compound Junior Men	Robin Jäätma; Estonia	Yakup Yıldız; Turkey	Anders Faugstad; Norway
Compound Junior Men Team	Turkey; Batuhan Akçaoğlu; Göksel Altıntaş; Yakup Yıldız	Italy; Alex Boggiatto; Antonio Brunello; Valentino De Angeli	Denmark; Tore Bjarnarson; Mathias Fullerton; Simon Olsen
Recurve Junior Women	Zhanna Naumova; Ukraine	Mathilde Louis; France	Maria Zotova; Russia
Recurve Junior Women Team	Russia; Tuiana Budazhapova; Daria Oreshnikova; Maria Zotova	Ukraine; Oleksandra Kukuruziak; Zhanna Naumova; Yelyzaveta Sikalo	Turkey; Gökçe Demirel; Sevcan Derin; Elif Nida Güner
Compound Junior Women	Elisa Roner; Italy	Begüm Topkarcı; Turkey	Elizaveta Knyazeva; Russia
Compound Junior Women Team	Italy; Elisa Roner; Elisa Bazzichetto; Paola Natale	Turkey; Büşra Nur Gürlek; İpek Tomruk; Begüm Topkarcı	Russia; Elizaveta Knyazeva; Elizaveta Koroleva; Veronika Sanina

== Participating nations ==
180 archers from 25 countries:

1. Armenia (4)
2. Belgium (1)
3. Belarus (12)
4. Bulgaria (3)
5. Croatia (6)
6. Denmark (5)
7. Estonia (6)
8. Finland (4)
9. France (9)
10. Faroe Islands (1)
11. Georgia (7)
12. Greece (3)
13. Israel (2)
14. Italy (24)
15. Kosovo (4)
16. Luxembourg (2)
17. Moldova (4)
18. Montenegro (1)
19. Netherlands (5)
20. Norway (9)
21. Russia (24)
22. Slovenia (6)
23. Slovakia (2)
24. Turkey (24) (Host)
25. Ukraine (12)
