= Song Yun-soo =

South Korean compound archer

Personal information
- Nationality: South Korean
- Born: 10 December 1995 (age 30)

Sport
- Country: South Korea
- Sport: Archery
Medal record
Women's compound archery
Representing South Korea
World Championships
Gold medal – first place	2017 Mexico City	Individual
Gold medal – first place	2017 Mexico City	Mixed team
Bronze medal – third place	2017 Mexico City	Team
Bronze medal – third place	2023 Berlin	Team
Asian Championships
Gold medal – first place	2015 Bangkok	Team
Gold medal – first place	2015 Bangkok	Mixed team
Gold medal – first place	2017 Dhaka	Individual
Gold medal – first place	2019 Bangkok	Team
Gold medal – first place	2021 Dhaka	Team
Silver medal – second place	2017 Dhaka	Team
Asian Games
Gold medal – first place	2018 Jakarta–Palembang	Team
Summer Universiade
Gold medal – first place	2015 Gwangju	Individual
Gold medal – first place	2015 Gwangju	Mixed team
Gold medal – first place	2017 Taipei	Individual
Gold medal – first place	2017 Taipei	Team
Bronze medal – third place	2015 Gwangju	Team

Song Yun-soo (born 10 December 1995) is a South Korean compound archer. She began learning archery in 2011 and made her international debut in 2015.

== Career ==
She competed at the 2015 Summer Universiade games winning gold medals in the women's individual event and the mixed team event alongside Kim Jong-ho and a bronze medal in the women's team event alongside Kim Yun-hee and Seol Da-yeong. She also won two gold medals at the 2017 Summer Universiade games in the women's individual event and the women's team event alongside Kim Yun-hee and So Chaewon.

She participated at the 2017 World Archery Championships winning gold medals in the women's individual event and the mixed team event alongside Kim Jong-ho and a bronze medal in the women's team event alongside Choi Bo-min and So Chaewon.

In 2018, she won a gold medal at the Asian Games in the Women's team event alongside Choi Bo-min and So Chaewon.
