= Archery at the 2019 Summer Universiade – Women's team compound =

Women's team compound at the XXX Summer Universiade
- Venues: Partenio Stadium, Royal Palace
- Dates: July 8, 2019 – July 13, 2019
- Competitors: 32 from 16 nations

Medalists
1st place, gold medalist(s)		Yunhee Kim; Chaewon So	South Korea
2nd place, silver medalist(s)		Yeşim Bostan; Gizem Elmaağaçlı	Turkey
3rd place, bronze medalist(s)		Yi-Hsuan Chen; Ming-Ching Lin	Chinese Taipei

The women's team compound archery competition at the 2019 Summer Universiade was held in the Partenio Stadium, Avellino, Italy and the Royal Palace in Caserta, Italy between July 8 and 13.

== Qualification round ==
Rank	Team	Archer	Individual	Team	Notes
Rank	Team	Archer	Score	Total	Notes
1	South Korea	Yunhee Kim	691	1386	
1	South Korea	Chaewon So	695	1386	
2	Turkey	Yeşim Bostan	701	1382	
2	Turkey	Gizem Elmaağaçlı	681	1382	
3	Mexico	Andrea Maya Becerra Arizaga	693	1379	
3	Mexico	Brenda Merino Escudero	686	1379	
4	Great Britain	Isabelle Annie Carpenter	674	1366	
4	Great Britain	Sarah Elizabeth Moon	692	1366	
5	Chinese Taipei	Yi-Hsuan Chen	690	1365	
5	Chinese Taipei	Ming-Ching Lin	675	1365	
6	Russia	Elizaveta Knyazeva	681	1364	
6	Russia	Alexandra Savenkova	683	1364	
7	Kazakhstan	Viktoriya Lyan	685	1360	
7	Kazakhstan	Diana Makarchuk	675	1360	
8	Estonia	Emily Hoim	675	1355	
8	Estonia	Lisell Jaatma	680	1355	
9	India	Prabhjot Kaur	678	1347	
9	India	Srishti Singh	669	1347	
10	Italy	Eleonora Grilli	672	1336	T. 64;17
10	Italy	Sara Ret	664	1336	T. 64;17
11	Iran	Sogand Haddad	678	1336	T. 62;25
11	Iran	Bahareh Rezaei	658	1336	T. 62;25
12	Indonesia	Ratih Zilizati Fadhly	669	1335	
12	Indonesia	Tiara Sakti Ramadhani	666	1335	
13	Ukraine	Oleksandra Hrabik	671	1325	
13	Ukraine	Anastasia Krasnitska	654	1325	
14	Malaysia	Nur Aina Yasmine Halim	667	1321	
14	Malaysia	Iman Aisyah Norazam	654	1321	
15	United States	Cassidy Louise Cox	386	1058	
15	United States	Dahlia Haline Klimitchek	672	1058	

== Elimination rounds ==
Round of 16
9	India	147
8	Estonia	150
5	Chinese Taipei	146 T.20
12	Indonesia	146 T.17
13	Ukraine	146
4	Great Britain	149
3	Mexico	150
14	Malaysia	149
11	Iran	148
6	Russia	149
7	Kazakhstan	145
10	Italy	153
15	United States	148
2	Turkey	152

Quarterfinals
1	South Korea	145
8	Estonia	144
5	Chinese Taipei	153
4	Great Britain	147
3	Mexico	149
6	Russia	151
7	Italy	150
2	Turkey	155

Semifinals
1	South Korea	153 T.19*
5	Chinese Taipei	153 T.19
6	Russia	153
2	Turkey	154

Final
1	South Korea	156
2	Turkey	154
Third place
5	Chinese Taipei	154
6	Russia	149
