= Divya Dhayal =

Indian archer

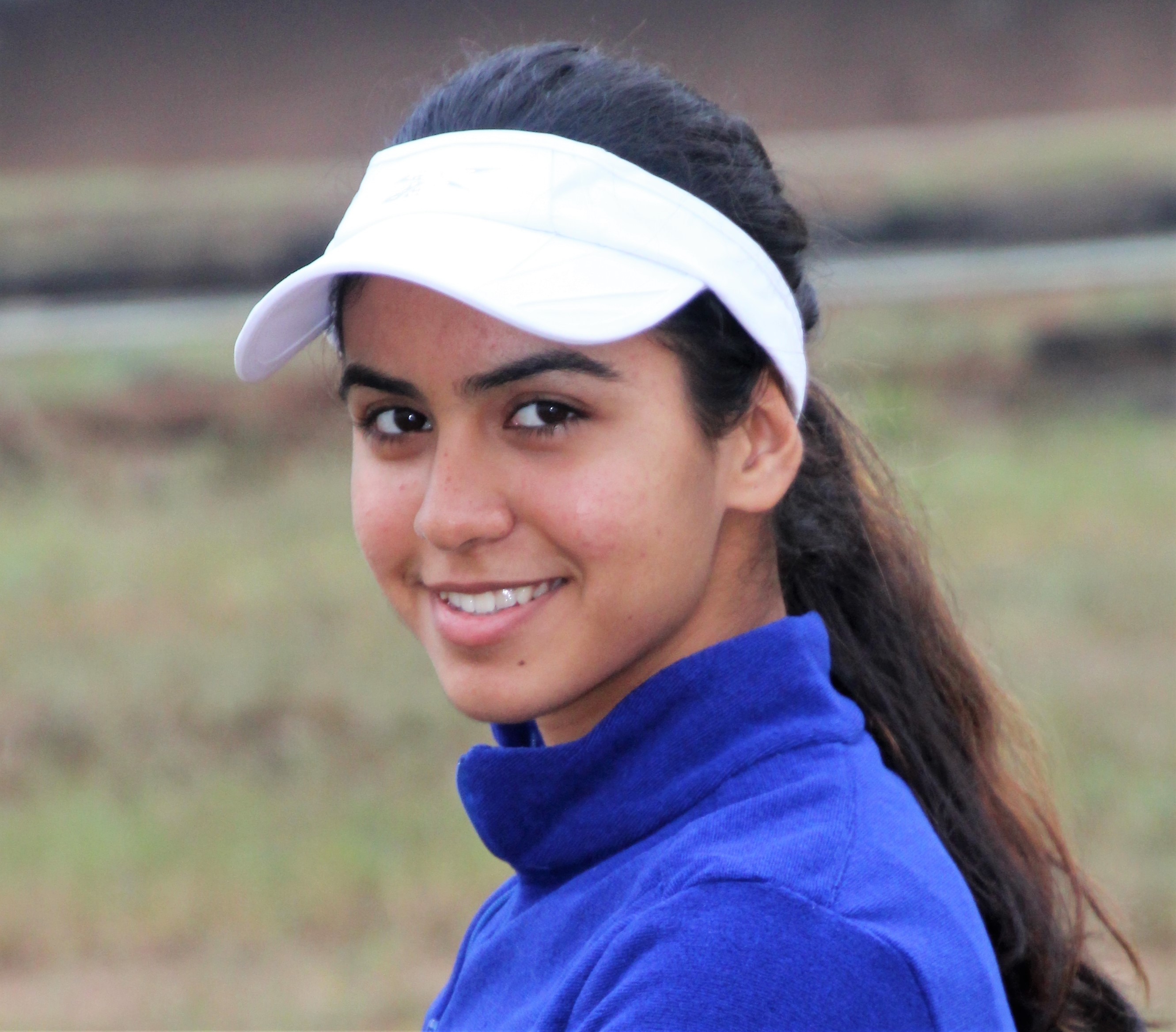
- Divya Dhayal is a female archer from India

Personal information
- Nationality: India
- Citizenship: India
- Born: Bareilly, Uttar Pradesh, India
- Years active: 2014–present

Sport
- Country: India
- Sport: Archery
- Rank: 35
- Team: Archery Association of India
- Turned pro: 2014
- Coached by: Vikram S. Dhayal

Achievements and titles
- Highest world ranking: 21

Divya Dhayal is an Indian archer. She became the national archery champion at age 15. She has represented India at world archery youth championships, archery world cups, international archery tournaments and other international archery events

== Early life and education ==
Dhayal, born in Bareilly, comes from a military family. Her father Colonel Vikram S Dhayal is an army officer. She started her early archery training at the Army Sports Institute. in Pune and later at other places, under her father.

== Career ==
Divya started her archery journey at the age of 13 years in 2014.

=== National ===
She won the Senior National Archery Championship in 2017 by winning the individual gold and mixed team gold.

=== International ===
She started playing as an International player by participating in the World Cup as a compound archer and has played for India since 2016.

Achievements
Year	Title	Category	Medal	Place
2018	Archery Asia Cup Competition, Stage-3	Women's Compound Individual	Silver	Chinese Taipei
2018	Asia Cup, Stage-2	Women's Compound Individual	Bronze	Manila
2018	Asia Cup, Stage-2	Women's Compound Team	Silver	Manila
2018	Asia Cup, Stage-1	Women's Compound Team	Bronze	Bangkok
2018	World Cup	Women's Compound Team	Silver	Antalya
2017	World archery youth championship	Women's Compound Team	Bronze	Rosario
2017	Asia Cup	Women's Compound Team	Silver	Taiwan
2017	Asia Cup	Women's Compound Individual	Gold	Taiwan
2017	Asia Cup	Mixed Compound Team	Gold	Taiwan
2017	World Cup	Mixed Compound Team	Bronze	Antalya

== Personal life ==
She gained the rank of Lieutenant in the Indian Army as a commissioned officer in September 2023. She received the Indian Sports Honours and has two siblings Khushbu Dhayal and Digvijay Dhayal. She completed her schooling from the Army Public School, Pune and bachelors from Symbiosis Institute, Pune.
