= Süleyman Araz =

Turkish archer (born 1995)

Personal information
- Born: 1 August 1995 (age 30)

Sport
- Country: Turkey
- Sport: Archery
- Event: Compound
Medal record
Men's compound archery
Representing Turkey
World Championships
Silver medal – second place	2019 's-Hertogenbosch	Team
Summer Universiade
Gold medal – first place	2019 Naples	Team
Archery World Cup
Silver medal – second place	2019 Antalya	Team

Süleyman Araz (born 1 August 1995) is a Turkish archer competing in men's compound events. He won the silver medal in the men's team compound event at the 2019 World Archery Championships held in 's-Hertogenbosch, Netherlands.

In 2019, Araz won, alongside Muhammed Yetim, the gold medal in the men's team compound event at the 2019 Summer Universiade held in Naples, Italy. In the same year, he also won the silver medal in the men's team event at the competition held in Antalya, Turkey as part of the 2019 Archery World Cup.
