= Yeşim Bostan =

Turkish archer (born 1995)

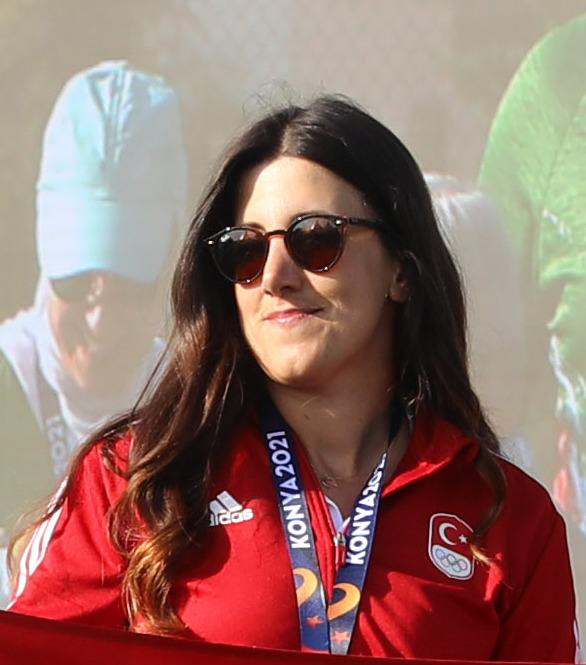

Personal information
- Born: 24 May 1995 (age 31) Muğla, Turkey

Sport
- Country: Turkey
- Sport: Archery
- Event: compound
- Club: İstanbul Büyükşehir Belediyespor
Medal record
Women's Archery
Representing Turkey
World Championships
| Silver medal – second place | 2017 Mexico City | Individual |
World Indoor Championships
| Gold medal – first place | 2014 Nimes | Junior team |
| Silver medal – second place | 2018 Yankton | Individual |
European Championships
| Gold medal – first place | 2016 Nottingham | Team |
| Gold medal – first place | 2018 Legnica | Team |
| Silver medal – second place | 2018 Legnica | Individual |
| Bronze medal – third place | 2014 Echmiadzin | Team |
| Bronze medal – third place | 2022 Munich | Team |
| Bronze medal – third place | 2022 Munich | Mixed team |
European Games
| Bronze medal – third place | 2019 Minsk | Mixed team |
European Indoor Championships
| Bronze medal – third place | 2019 Samsun | Team |
World Cup
| Gold medal – first place | 2018 Samsun | Mixed team |
| Gold medal – first place | 2018 Antalya | Individual |
| Gold medal – first place | 2019 Berlin | Team |
| Gold medal – first place | 2022 Paris | Team |
| Silver medal – second place | 2022 Paris | Team |
| Bronze medal – third place | 2016 Antalya | Individual |
| Bronze medal – third place | 2017 Rome | Individual |
| Bronze medal – third place | 2019 Shamghai | Team |
| Bronze medal – third place | 2019 Shamghai | Team |
| Bronze medal – third place | 2019 Antalya | Mixed team |
Islamic Solidarity Games
| Gold medal – first place | 2021 Konya | Mixed team |
| Gold medal – first place | 2021 Konya | Team |
| Silver medal – second place | 2021 Konya | Individual |
Universiade
| Silver medal – second place | 2019 Naples | Team |
| Silver medal – second place | 2017 Taipei | Mixed team |
| Bronze medal – third place | 2019 Naples | Individual |
| Bronze medal – third place | 2017 Taipei | Team |

Yeşim Bostan (born 24 May 1995) is a Turkish compound archer. She is native of Muğla, Turkey, where she studied physical education at Sıtkı Koçman University. She is a member of İstanbul Büyükşehir Belediyespor.

== Career ==
Representing Turkey, she debuted internationally in 2014, and on the bronze medal in the team event at the 2014 European Championships in Echmiadzin, Armenia. She competed in three events at the 2015 World Championships in Copenhagen, Denmark. At the 2018 World Indoor Championships in Yankton, South Dakota, USA, she took the silver medal in the Individual event. At the second leg of the 2018 World Cup in Antalya, she became gold medalist in Individual event.

In 2022, she won the bronze medal in the women's team compound event at the European Indoor Archery Championships held in Laško, Slovenia. She also won the bronze medal in the mixed team compound event. She won the silver medal in the women's team compound event at the Antalya, Turkey event in the 2022 Archery World Cup.
