= Gizem Elmaağaçlı =

Turkish archer (born 1997)

Personal information
- Born: 4 November 1997 (age 28) Kayseri, Turkey

Sport
- Country: Turkey
- Sport: Archery
- Event: compound
- Club: Kayseri Büyükşehir Belediyespor
Medal record
Women's Archery
Representing Turkey
World Indoor Championships
Gold medal – first place	2016 Ankara	Junior team
European Championships
Gold medal – first place	2018 Legnica	Team
European Indoor Championships
Gold medal – first place	2019 Samsun	Individual
Bronze medal – third place	2019 Samsun	Team
World Cup
Gold medal – first place	2019 Berlin	Team
Bronze medal – third place	2019 Shamghai	Team
Bronze medal – third place	2018 Berlin	Team
Universiade
Silver medal – second place	2019 Naples	Team
Bronze medal – third place	2017 Taipei	Team

Gizem Elmaağaçlı (born 4 November 1997) is a Turkish compound archer. She is a member of Kayseri Büyükşehir Belediyespor and part of the national team.

== Career ==
Gizem Elmaağaçlı won the gold medal in the compound women event at the 2019 European Indoor Archery Championships held in Samsun, Türkiye. She also won the bronze medal in the women's team compound event. Gizem received the invitational place to the Hyundai Archery World Cup Final held in Samsun at the end of the 2018 outdoor season. She lost her first match of that competition against eventual winner Sara Lopez.
