= Anton Bulaev =

Russian archer (born 1996)

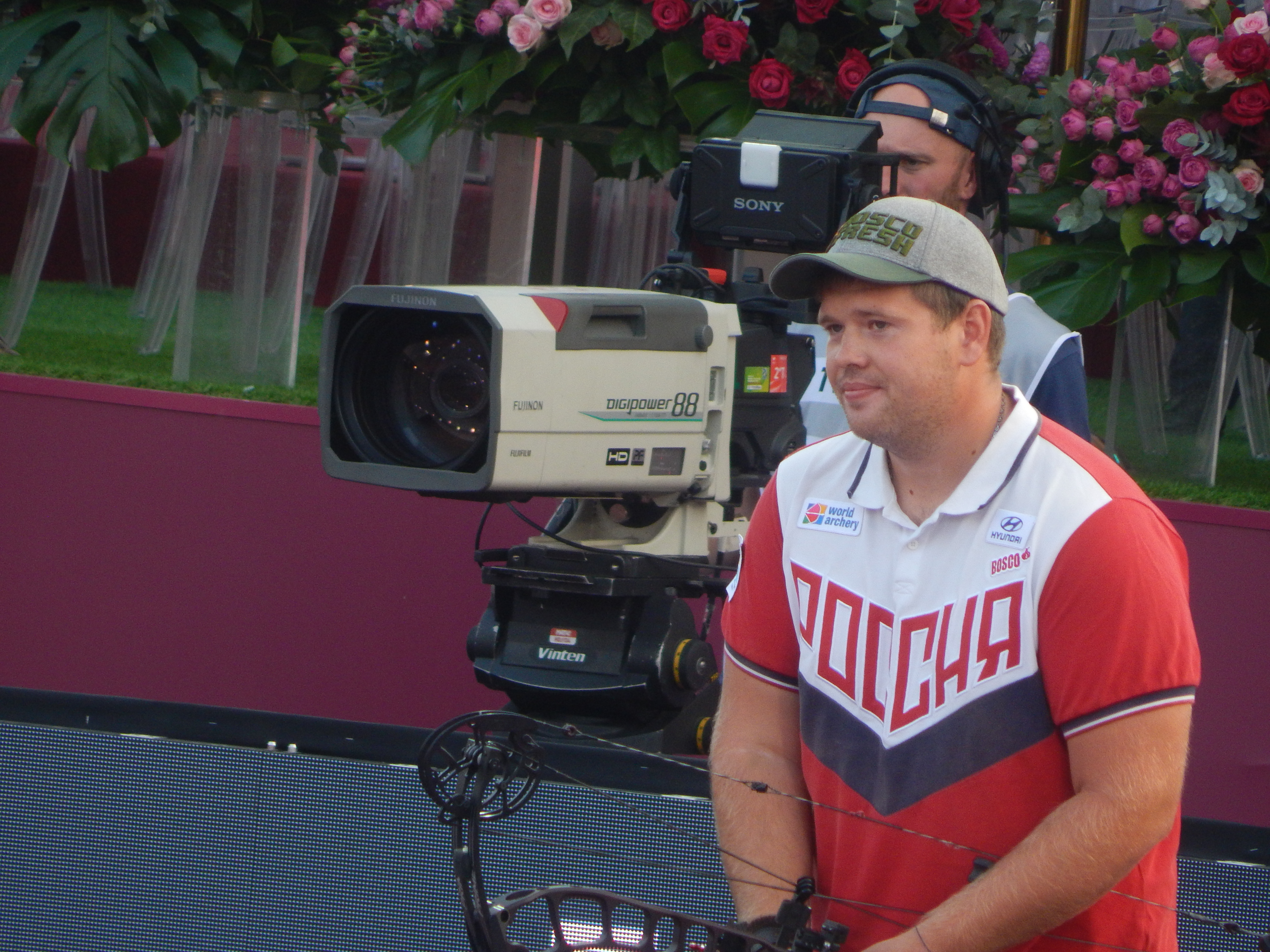

Personal information
- Born: 20 July 1996 (age 30)

Sport
- Country: Russia
- Sport: Archery
- Event: Compound
Medal record
Men's compound archery
Representing Russia
European Championships
Gold medal – first place	2018 Legnica	Individual
European Games
Gold medal – first place	2019 Minsk	Mixed team
Summer Universiade
Gold medal – first place	2017 Taipei	Team
Gold medal – first place	2019 Naples	Individual

Anton Aleksandrovich Bulaev (Russian: Антон Александрович Булаев; born 20 July 1996) is a Russian archer competing in men's compound events. He won, alongside Natalia Avdeeva, the gold medal in the mixed team compound event at the 2019 European Games held in Minsk, Belarus.

== Career ==
He competed at the 2013 World Archery Youth Championships held in Wuxi, China and he won the gold medal in the mixed team compound event.

In 2017, he won the gold medal in the men's team compound event at the Summer Universiade held in Taipei, Taiwan. At the 2018 European Archery Championships in Legnica, Poland he won the gold medal in the men's individual compound event.

In 2019, Buleav won the gold medal in the men's individual compound event at the Summer Universiade held in Naples, Italy.

He competed at the 2021 World Archery Championships held in Yankton, United States.
