= Muhammed Yetim =

Turkish archer (born 1994)

Personal information
- Born: 4 November 1994 (age 31)

Sport
- Country: Turkey
- Sport: Archery
- Event: Compound
Medal record
Men's compound archery
Representing Turkey
World Championships
Silver medal – second place	2019 's-Hertogenbosch	Team
Summer Universiade
Gold medal – first place	2019 Naples	Team
Silver medal – second place	2019 Naples	Individual

Muhammed Yetim (born 4 November 1994) is a Turkish archer competing in men's compound events. He won the silver medal in the men's team compound event at the 2019 World Archery Championships held in 's-Hertogenbosch, Netherlands.

In 2019, Yetim also won the silver medal in the men's individual compound event at the Summer Universiade held in Naples, Italy. Alongside Süleyman Araz, he also won the gold medal in the men's team compound event.
