= Iran at the 2019 Summer Universiade =

- Flag of Iran
- IOC code: IRI

in Naples, Italy 3 July 2019 – 14 July 2019
- Medals Ranked 9th: Gold 7 Silver 3 Bronze 7 Total 17

Summer Universiade appearances (overview)
- 1973; 1975; 1977; 1979–2001; 2003; 2005; 2007; 2009; 2011; 2013; 2015; 2017; 2019; 2021

Iran competed at the 2019 Summer Universiade in Naples, Italy held from 3 to 14 July 2019.

== Medal summary ==
=== Medal by sports ===
Medals by sport
| Archery | 0 | 1 | 0 | 1 |
| Shooting | 2 | 2 | 1 | 5 |
| Taekwondo | 5 | 0 | 6 | 11 |

=== Medalists ===
| Medal | Name | Sport | Event | Date |
|---|---|---|---|---|
| Silver | Kiarash Farzan; Mohammad Saleh Palizban | Archery | Men's compound team | |
