= Kim Jong-ho (archer) =

Korean compound archer (born 1994)

Personal information
- Born: 18 July 1994 (age 32)

Sport
- Sport: Archery
- Event: Compound
Medal record
Men's compound archery
Representing South Korea
| Event | 1st | 2nd | 3rd |
|---|---|---|---|
| World Championships | 4 | 0 | 2 |
| Asian Games | 2 | 2 | 0 |
| Asian Championships | 6 | 4 | 2 |
| Summer Universiade | 5 | 0 | 3 |
| Total | 17 | 6 | 7 |
World Championships
| Gold medal – first place | 2015 Copenhagen | Mixed team |
| Gold medal – first place | 2017 Mexico City | Mixed team |
| Gold medal – first place | 2019 's-Hertogenbosch | Team |
| Gold medal – first place | 2019 's-Hertogenbosch | Mixed team |
| Bronze medal – third place | 2019 's-Hertogenbosch | Individual |
| Bronze medal – third place | 2021 Yankton | Mixed team |
Asian Games
| Gold medal – first place | 2018 Jakarta | Team |
| Gold medal – first place | 2026 Aichi–Nagoya | Individual |
| Silver medal – second place | 2018 Jakarta | Mixed team |
| Silver medal – second place | 2022 Hangzhou | Team |
Asian Championships
| Gold medal – first place | 2015 Bangkok | Mixed team |
| Gold medal – first place | 2017 Dhaka | Team |
| Gold medal – first place | 2017 Dhaka | Mixed team |
| Gold medal – first place | 2021 Dhaka | Individual |
| Gold medal – first place | 2021 Dhaka | Team |
| Gold medal – first place | 2023 Bangkok | Team |
| Silver medal – second place | 2013 Taipei | Team |
| Silver medal – second place | 2015 Bangkok | Team |
| Silver medal – second place | 2017 Dhaka | Individual |
| Silver medal – second place | 2023 Bangkok | Individual |
| Bronze medal – third place | 2025 Dhaka | Team |
| Bronze medal – third place | 2025 Dhaka | Mixed team |
Summer Universiade
| Gold medal – first place | 2015 Gwangju | Individual |
| Gold medal – first place | 2015 Gwangju | Team |
| Gold medal – first place | 2015 Gwangju | Mixed team |
| Gold medal – first place | 2017 Taipei | Individual |
| Gold medal – first place | 2017 Taipei | Mixed team |
| Bronze medal – third place | 2017 Taipei | Team |
| Bronze medal – third place | 2019 Naples | Individual |
| Bronze medal – third place | 2019 Naples | Mixed team |

Kim Jong-ho (Korean: 김종호; born 18 July 1994) is a Korean archer who competes in compound events. He is a four-time World Champion and six-time Asian Champion.

== Career ==
During the 2015 Summer Universiade, Kim set a Universiade record of 705 in archery and won a gold medal in the individual event. He again competed at the 2017 Summer Universiade and won a gold medal in the individual event. During the qualification round of the 2019 Summer Universiade, he set a new Universiade record of 716 in the individual event, four points off perfect and two points off Braden Gellenthien's world record.

Kim won three consecutive mixed team World Championships from 2015 to 2019. He also helped South Korea win gold in men's team compound event in 2019 for the first time in history.
