= 2023 World Archery Championships – Women's individual compound =

Archery competition

2023 World Archery Championships
Men	Recurve	Compound
Women	Recurve	Compound
Team	Men's recurve	Men's compound
Team	Women's recurve	Women's compound
Mixed team	Recurve	Compound

The women's individual compound competition at the 2023 World Archery Championships took place from 1 to 5 August in Berlin, Germany.

== Schedule ==
All times are Central European Summer Time (UTC+02:00).

Date	Time	Round
Tuesday, 1 August	14:00	Qualification round
Thursday, 3 August	14:15; 15:00; 15:45; 16:25	1/48 finals 1/24 finals 1/16 finals 1/8 finals
Saturday, 5 August	10:02; 10:50; 11:19; 11:31	Quarterfinals; Semifinals; Bronze medal match Final

== Qualification round ==
Results after 72 arrows.

Rank	Name	Nation	Score	10+X	X
1	Sara López	Colombia	702	54	15
2	Jyothi Surekha Vennam	India	701	54	23
3	Dafne Quintero	Mexico	698	51	20
4	Sofía Paiz	El Salvador	696	50	15
5	Ana Hernández	Mexico	695	49	22
6	Aditi Gopichand Swami	India	693	50	26
7	So Chae-won	South Korea	693	48	15
8	Isabelle Carpenter	Great Britain	692	45	19
9	Alexis Ruiz	United States	692	45	10
10	Mariya Shkolna	Luxembourg	691	47	20
11	Alejandra Usquiano	Colombia	691	47	16
12	Ella Gibson	Great Britain	691	46	23
13	Viktoriya Lyan	Kazakhstan	691	45	20
14	Lisell Jäätma	Estonia	690	45	22
15	Oh Yoo-hyun	South Korea	689	45	19
16	Andrea Becerra	Mexico	689	43	20
17	Paola Ramírez	Puerto Rico	688	46	14
18	Wang Lu-yun	Chinese Taipei	687	44	20
19	Sanne de Laat	Netherlands	687	42	14
20	Katharina Raab	Germany	687	40	24
21	Elisa Roner	Italy	686	42	12
22	Song Yun-soo	South Korea	686	41	17
23	Sandra Jankowska	Poland	683	44	14
24	Loh Tze Chieh	Singapore	683	39	17
25	Layla Annison	Great Britain	683	37	9
26	Parneet Kaur	India	681	39	13
27	Chen Yi-hsuan	Chinese Taipei	681	38	11
28	Juliana Gallego	Colombia	681	37	16
29	Andrea Muñoz	Spain	681	37	10
30	Meeri-Marita Paas	Estonia	680	45	15
31	Adel Zhexenbinova	Kazakhstan	680	39	21
32	Sandra Herve	France	680	38	17
33	Olivia Dean	United States	679	37	15
34	Liko Arreola	United States	679	37	7
35	Julia Böhnke	Germany	679	35	13
36	Chen Li-ju	Chinese Taipei	679	34	21
37	İpek Tomruk	Turkey	677	39	14
38	Fatin Nurfatehah Mat Salleh	Malaysia	677	36	17
39	Jennifer Walter	Germany	677	35	11
40	Rhiannon Mills	Australia	677	34	9
41	Sophie Dodemont	France	676	40	12
42	Eiry Snack Nisi	Brazil	676	39	8
43	Hazal Burun	Turkey	674	38	15
44	Marcella Tonioli	Italy	674	37	12
45	Kanyavee Maneesombatkul	Thailand	674	32	13
46	Małgorzata Kapusta	Poland	674	32	9
47	Paola Corado	El Salvador	672	35	13
48	Maris Tetsmann	Estonia	672	33	8
49	Bonna Akter	Bangladesh	670	33	12
50	Tiphaine Renaudin	France	670	31	14
51	Sarah Prieels	Belgium	670	29	13
52	Kseniya Markitantova	Poland	669	36	16
53	Blanca Rodrigo	Ecuador	669	33	11
54	Lara Drobnjak	Croatia	669	32	7
55	Satu Nisula	Finland	669	28	12
56	Inga Timinskienė	Lithuania	668	37	17
57	Kanoknapus Kaewchomphu	Thailand	668	31	12
58	Jaqueline Ringström	Sweden	668	30	9
59	Camila Alvarenga	El Salvador	667	33	9
60	Cheng Hung Ting	Hong Kong	667	28	10
61	Ksenia Shkliar	Ukraine	666	29	9
62	Veerle Sparreboom	Netherlands	665	33	7
63	Ong Xue Li	Singapore	665	29	8
64	Jeanine van Kradenburg	South Africa	664	36	16
65	Andrea Moccia	Italy	664	32	9
66	Ingrid Ronacher	Austria	663	31	10
67	Roxana Yunussova	Kazakhstan	663	28	8
68	Maria Ribeiro	Portugal	662	32	12
69	Petra Kočutová	Slovakia	661	31	9
70	Amanda Mlinarić	Croatia	659	30	10
71	Irmak Yüksel	Turkey	658	29	15
72	Nichaphat Bunyapalin	Thailand	656	28	11
73	Martine Stas-Couwenberg	Netherlands	654	22	6
74	Myriam Hasler	Switzerland	652	30	13
75	Amna Ahmed	United Arab Emirates	652	27	8
76	Erika Damsbo	Denmark	651	26	8
77	Cloé Isch	Switzerland	647	22	8
78	Clémentine de Giuli	Switzerland	636	21	4
79	Giselle de Sousa	Portugal	632	30	10
80	Anna Alfreðsdóttir	Iceland	631	19	10
81	Joumana Ahmed	United Arab Emirates	622	16	7
82	Wong Yuk Sheun	Hong Kong	615	15	3
83	Ewa Płoszaj	Iceland	584	12	4
84	Astrid Daxböck	Iceland	566	11	5

== Final round ==
Quarterfinals
16	(Mexico) Andrea Becerra	146
41	(France) Sophie Dodemont	143
37	(Turkey) İpek Tomruk	143
36	(Chinese Taipei) Chen Li-ju	141
19	(Netherlands) Sanne de Laat	148
6	(India) Aditi Gopichand Swami	148
26	(India) Parneet Kaur	143
2	(India) Jyothi Surekha Vennam	149

Semifinals
16	(Mexico) Andrea Becerra	147
37	(Turkey) İpek Tomruk	144
6	(India) Aditi Gopichand Swami	149
2	(India) Jyothi Surekha Vennam	145

Finals
16	(Mexico) Andrea Becerra	147
6	(India) Aditi Gopichand Swami	149
Third place
37	(Turkey) İpek Tomruk	146
2	(India) Jyothi Surekha Vennam	150

== Elimination round ==
=== Section 1 ===
1/48 finals
1	(Colombia) S López
Bye
33	(United States) O Dean	142
80	(Iceland) A Alfreðsdóttir	130
81	(United Arab Emirates) J Ahmed	117
32	(France) S Herve	124'
17	(Puerto Rico) P Ramírez
Bye
65	(Italy) A Moccia	126
48	(Estonia) M Tetsmann	130
49	(Bangladesh) B Akter	121
64	(South Africa) J van Kradenburg	133
Bye
16	(Mexico) A Becerra

1/24 finals
1	(Colombia) S López
Bye
33	(United States) O Dean	140
32	(France) S Herve	133
17	(Puerto Rico) P Ramírez	138
48	(Estonia) M Tetsmann	134
64	(South Africa) J van Kradenburg	138
16	(Mexico) A Becerra	144

1/16 finals
1	(Colombia) S López	146
32	(United States) O Dean	138
17	(Puerto Rico) P Ramírez	140
16	(Mexico) A Becerra	144

1/8 finals
1	(Colombia) S López	139
16	(Mexico) A Becerra	146

=== Section 2 ===
1/48 finals
9	(United States) A Ruiz
Bye
57	(Thailand) K Kaewchomphu	129
56	(Lithuania) I Timinskienė	132
41	(France) S Dodemont	136
72	(Thailand) N Bunyapalin	117
Bye
24	(Singapore) Loh TC
25	(United Kingdom) L Annison
Bye
73	(Netherlands) M Stas-Couwenberg	131^{8}
40	(Australia) R Mills	131^{0}
Bye
8	(United Kingdom) I Carpenter

1/24 finals
9	(United States) A Ruiz	138
56	(Lithuania) I Timinskienė	133
41	(France) S Dodemont	140
24	(Singapore) Loh TC	137
25	(United Kingdom) L Annison	136
73	(Netherlands) M Stas-Couwenberg	134
Bye
8	(United Kingdom) I Carpenter

1/16 finals
9	(United States) A Ruiz	139
41	(France) S Dodemont	141
25	(United Kingdom) L Annison	137
8	(United Kingdom) I Carpenter	138

1/8 finals
41	(France) S Dodemont	143^{10}
8	(United Kingdom) I Carpenter	143^{9}

=== Section 3 ===
1/48 finals
5	(Mexico) A Hernández
Bye
37	(Turkey) İ Tomruk	128
76	(Denmark) E Damsbo	123
Bye
28	(Colombia) J Gallego
21	(Italy) E Roner
Bye
69	(Slovakia) P Kočutová	116
44	(Italy) M Tonioli	134
53	(Ecuador) B Rodrigo	132^{6}
60	(Hong Kong) Cheng HT	132^{10}
Bye
12	(United Kingdom) E Gibson

1/24 finals
5	(Mexico) A Hernández
Bye
37	(Turkey) İ Tomruk	139
28	(Colombia) J Gallego	120
21	(Italy) E Roner	138
44	(Italy) M Tonioli	135
60	(Hong Kong) Cheng HT	128
12	(United Kingdom) E Gibson	139

1/16 finals
5	(Mexico) A Hernández	137
37	(Turkey) İ Tomruk	141
21	(Italy) E Roner	143^{10}
12	(United Kingdom) E Gibson	143^{9}

1/8 finals
37	(Turkey) İ Tomruk	145
21	(Italy) E Roner	138

=== Section 4 ===
1/48 finals
13	(Kazakhstan) V Lyan
Bye
61	(Ukraine) K Shkliar	135
52	(Poland) K Markitantova	126
45	(Thailand) K Maneesombatkul	138
68	(Portugal) M Ribeiro	131
Bye
20	(Germany) K Raab
29	(Spain) A Muñoz	132
84	(Iceland) A Daxböck	89
77	(Switzerland) C Isch	102
36	(Chinese Taipei) Chen L-j	134
Bye
4	(El Salvador) S Paiz

1/24 finals
13	(Kazakhstan) V Lyan	137
61	(Ukraine) K Shkliar	138
45	(Thailand) K Maneesombatkul	132
20	(Germany) K Raab	125
29	(Spain) A Muñoz	136
36	(Chinese Taipei) Chen L-j	137
Bye
4	(El Salvador) S Paiz

1/16 finals
61	(Ukraine) K Shkliar	141
45	(Thailand) K Maneesombatkul	132
36	(Chinese Taipei) Chen L-j	139
4	(El Salvador) S Paiz	138

1/8 finals
61	(Ukraine) K Shkliar	137
36	(Chinese Taipei) Chen L-j	144

=== Section 5 ===
1/48 finals
3	(Mexico) D Quintero
Bye
35	(Germany) J Böhnke	135
78	(Switzerland) C de Giuli	121
83	(Iceland) E Płoszaj	118
30	(Estonia) M-M Paas	134
19	(Netherlands) S de Laat
Bye
67	(Kazakhstan) R Yunussova	128^{0}
46	(Poland) M Kapusta	128^{7}
51	(Belgium) S Prieels	135
62	(Netherlands) V Sparreboom	109
Bye
14	(Estonia) L Jäätma

1/24 finals
3	(Mexico) D Quintero
Bye
35	(Germany) J Böhnke	136
30	(Estonia) M-M Paas	138
19	(Netherlands) S de Laat	134
46	(Poland) M Kapusta	126
51	(Belgium) S Prieels	139
14	(Estonia) L Jäätma	141

1/16 finals
3	(Mexico) D Quintero	139
30	(Estonia) M-M Paas	144
19	(Netherlands) S de Laat	142^{10+}
14	(Estonia) L Jäätma	142^{10}

1/8 finals
30	(Estonia) M-M Paas	142
19	(Netherlands) S de Laat	143

=== Section 6 ===
1/48 finals
11	(Colombia) A Usquiano
Bye
59	(El Salvador) C Alvarenga	138
54	(Croatia) L Drobnjak	129
43	(Turkey) H Burun	136
70	(Croatia) A Mlinarić	129
Bye
22	(South Korea) Song Y-s
27	(Chinese Taipei) Chen Y-h
Bye
75	(United Arab Emirates) A Ahmed	135
38	(Malaysia) FN Mat Salleh	134
Bye
6	(India) AG Swami

1/24 finals
11	(Colombia) A Usquiano	141
59	(El Salvador) C Alvarenga	135
43	(Turkey) H Burun	142
22	(South Korea) Song Y-s	136
27	(Chinese Taipei) Chen Y-h	133^{9}
75	(United Arab Emirates) A Ahmed	133^{8}
Bye
6	(India) AG Swami

1/16 finals
11	(Colombia) A Usquiano	142
43	(Turkey) H Burun	141
27	(Chinese Taipei) Chen Y-h	130
6	(India) AG Swami	141

1/8 finals
11	(Colombia) A Usquiano	140
6	(India) AG Swami	144

=== Section 7 ===
1/48 finals
7	(South Korea) So C-w
Bye
39	(Germany) J Walter	130
74	(Switzerland) M Hasler	125
Bye
26	(India) P Kaur
23	(Poland) S Jankowska
Bye
71	(Turkey) I Yüksel	125
42	(Brazil) E Snack Nisi	134
55	(Finland) S Nisula	130
58	(Sweden) J Ringström	121
Bye
10	(Luxembourg) M Shkolna

1/24 finals
7	(South Korea) So C-w
Bye
39	(Germany) J Walter	137
26	(India) P Kaur	141
23	(Poland) S Jankowska	133^{10}
42	(Brazil) E Snack Nisi	133^{9}
55	(Finland) S Nisula	139^{8}
10	(Luxembourg) M Shkolna	139^{9}

1/16 finals
7	(South Korea) So C-w	145
26	(India) P Kaur	147
23	(Poland) S Jankowska	134
10	(Luxembourg) M Shkolna	138

1/8 finals
26	(India) P Kaur	145^{10+}
10	(Luxembourg) M Shkolna	145^{10}

=== Section 8 ===
1/48 finals
15	(South Korea) Oh Y-h
Bye
63	(Singapore) Ong XL	120
50	(France) T Renaudin	129
47	(El Salvador) P Corado	138
66	(Austria) I Ronacher	131
Bye
18	(Chinese Taipei) Wang L-y
31	(Kazakhstan) A Zhexenbinova	132
82	(Hong Kong) Wong YS	119
79	(Portugal) G de Sousa	121
34	(United States) L Arreola	128
Bye
2	(India) JS Vennam

1/24 finals
15	(South Korea) Oh Y-h	143
50	(France) T Renaudin	137
47	(El Salvador) P Corado	135
18	(Chinese Taipei) Wang L-y	139
31	(Kazakhstan) A Zhexenbinova	137
34	(United States) L Arreola	140
Bye
2	(India) JS Vennam

1/16 finals
15	(South Korea) Oh Y-h	140
18	(Chinese Taipei) Wang L-y	135
34	(United States) L Arreola	136
2	(India) JS Vennam	139

1/8 finals
15	(South Korea) Oh Y-h	145
2	(India) JS Vennam	148
