= 2023 World Archery Championships – Women's team compound =

Archery competition

2023 World Archery Championships
Men	Recurve	Compound
Women	Recurve	Compound
Team	Men's recurve	Men's compound
Team	Women's recurve	Women's compound
Mixed team	Recurve	Compound

The women's team compound competition at the 2023 World Archery Championships took place from 1 to 4 August in Berlin, Germany.

== Schedule ==
All times are Central European Summer Time (UTC+02:00).

Date	Time	Round
Tuesday, 1 August	14:00	Qualification round
Wednesday, 2 August	16:15; 16:45; 17:15; 17:45	1/12 finals 1/8 finals Quarterfinals; Semifinals
Friday, 4 August	10:02; 10:28	Bronze medal match Final

== Qualification round ==
Results after 216 arrows.

Rank	Nation	Name	Score
1	Mexico	Andrea Becerra; Ana Hernández; Dafne Quintero	2082
2	India	Parneet Kaur; Aditi Gopichand Swami; Jyothi Surekha Vennam	2075
3	Colombia	Juliana Gallego; Sara López; Alejandra Usquiano	2074
4	South Korea	Oh Yoo-hyun; So Chae-won; Song Yun-soo	2068
5	Great Britain	Layla Annison; Isabelle Carpenter; Ella Gibson	2066
6	United States	Liko Arreola; Olivia Dean; Alexis Ruiz	2050
7	Chinese Taipei	Chen Yi-hsuan; Chen Li-ju; Wang Lu-yun	2047
8	Germany	Julia Böhnke; Katharina Raab; Jennifer Walter	2043
9	Estonia	Lisell Jäätma; Meeri-Marita Paas; Maris Tetsmann	2042
10	El Salvador	Camila Alvarenga; Paola Corado; Sofía Paiz	2035
11	Kazakhstan	Viktoriya Lyan; Roxana Yunussova; Adel Zhexenbinova	2034
12	Poland	Sandra Jankowska; Małgorzata Kapusta; Kseniya Markitantova	2026
13	France	Sophie Dodemont; Sandra Herve; Tiphaine Renaudin	2026
14	Italy	Andrea Moccia; Elisa Roner; Marcella Tonioli	2024
15	Turkey	Hazal Burun; İpek Tomruk; Irmak Yüksel	2009
16	Netherlands	Sanne de Laat; Veerle Sparreboom; Martine Stas-Couwenberg	2006
17	Thailand	Nichaphat Bunyapalin; Kanoknapus Kaewchomphu; Kanyavee Maneesombatkul	1998
18	Switzerland	Clémentine de Giuli; Myriam Hasler; Cloé Isch	1935
19	Iceland	Anna Alfreðsdóttir; Astrid Daxböck; Ewa Płoszaj	1781

== Elimination round ==
1/12 finals
1	Mexico
Bye
17	Thailand	226
16	Netherlands	224
9	Estonia
Bye
Bye
8	Germany
5	Great Britain
Bye
Bye
12	Poland
13	France
Bye
Bye
4	South Korea
3	Colombia
Bye
19	Iceland	190
14	Italy	222
11	Kazakhstan
Bye
Bye
6	United States
7	Chinese Taipei
Bye
Bye
10	El Salvador
15	Turkey	231
18	Switzerland	189
Bye
2	India

1/8 finals
1	Mexico	231
17	Thailand	227
9	Estonia	226
8	Germany	229
5	Great Britain	234
12	Poland	225
13	France	227
4	South Korea	229
3	Colombia	230
14	Italy	229
11	Kazakhstan	227
6	United States	233
7	Chinese Taipei	228
10	El Salvador	226
15	Turkey	228
2	India	230

Quarterfinals
1	Mexico	233
8	Germany	227
5	Great Britain	230
4	South Korea	233
3	Colombia	235
6	United States	225
7	Chinese Taipei	226
2	India	228

Semifinals
1	Mexico	224
4	South Korea	222
3	Colombia	216
2	India	220

Final
1	Mexico	229
2	India	235
Bronze medal
4	South Korea	230
3	Colombia	225
