= 2023 World Archery Championships – Compound mixed team =

Archery competition

2023 World Archery Championships
Men	Recurve	Compound
Women	Recurve	Compound
Team	Men's recurve	Men's compound
Team	Women's recurve	Women's compound
Mixed team	Recurve	Compound

The mixed team compound competition at the 2023 World Archery Championships took place from 1 to 4 August in Berlin, Germany.

== Schedule ==
All times are Central European Summer Time (UTC+02:00).

Date	Time	Round
Tuesday, 1 August	14:00	Qualification round
Wednesday, 2 August	13:15; 13:40; 14:05; 14:30	1/12 finals 1/8 finals Quarterfinals; Semifinals
Friday, 4 August	12:10; 12:29	Bronze medal match Final

== Qualification round ==
Results after 144 arrows.

Rank	Nation	Name	Score
1	India	Jyothi Surekha Vennam; Ojas Deotale	1403
2	Colombia	Sara López; Sebastián Arenas	1400
3	South Korea	So Chae-won; Kim Jong-ho	1396
4	El Salvador	Sofía Paiz; Roberto Hernández	1396
5	Netherlands	Sanne de Laat; Mike Schloesser	1392
6	Mexico	Dafne Quintero; Sebastián García	1392
7	Estonia	Lisell Jäätma; Robin Jäätma	1390
8	Poland	Sandra Jankowska; Przemysław Konecki	1387
9	United States	Alexis Ruiz; Sawyer Sullivan	1387
10	Turkey	İpek Tomruk; Emircan Haney	1386
11	Luxembourg	Mariya Shkolna; Gilles Seywert	1386
12	Great Britain	Isabelle Carpenter; Adam Carpenter	1384
13	Kazakhstan	Viktoriya Lyan; Andrey Tyutyun	1381
14	Italy	Elisa Roner; Federico Pagnoni	1380
15	Puerto Rico	Paola Ramírez; Jean Pizarro	1377
16	Australia	Rhiannon Mills; Brandon Hawes	1377
17	Germany	Katharina Raab; Leon Hollas	1377
18	Chinese Taipei	Wang Lu-yun; Chen Chieh-lun	1376
19	France	Sandra Herve; Adrien Gontier	1372
20	Malaysia	Fatin Nurfatehah Mat Salleh; Mohd Juwaidi Mazuki	1371
21	Croatia	Lara Drobnjak; Domagoj Buden	1368
22	Austria	Ingrid Ronacher; Nico Wiener	1366
23	Brazil	Eiry Snack Nisi; Luccas Abreu	1366
24	Slovakia	Petra Kočutová; Jozef Bošanský	1361
25	Sweden	Jaqueline Ringström; Alexander Kullberg	1359
26	Spain	Andrea Muñoz; Ramón López	1359
27	Belgium	Sarah Prieels; Quinten Van Looy	1358
28	South Africa	Jeanine van Kradenburg; Hendre Verhoef	1357
29	Bangladesh	Bonna Akter; Mohammad Ashikuzzaman	1355
30	Lithuania	Inga Timinskienė; Jonas Grigaravičius	1352
31	Denmark	Erika Damsbo; Mathias Fullerton	1352
32	Finland	Satu Nisula; Matti Tella	1352
33	Singapore	Loh Tze Chieh; Woon Teng Ng	1349
34	Thailand	Kanyavee Maneesombatkul; Nitiphum Chatachot	1349
35	Hong Kong	Cheng Hung Ting; Sze Sing Yu	1341
36	Portugal	Maria Ribeiro; Nuno Simões	1333
37	Switzerland	Myriam Hasler; Victor Canalejas	1314
38	United Arab Emirates	Amna Ahmed; Mohammed Bin Amro	1303
39	Iceland	Anna Alfreðsdóttir; Alfreð Birgisson	1281

== Elimination round ==
1/12 finals
1	India
Bye
17	Germany	151
16	Australia	156
9	United States	158
24	Slovakia	150
Bye
8	Poland
5	Netherlands
Bye
21	Croatia	150
12	Great Britain	152
13	Kazakhstan	152^{19}
20	Malaysia	152^{19+}
Bye
4	El Salvador
3	South Korea
Bye
19	France	151
14	Italy	157
11	Luxembourg	159
22	Austria	154
Bye
6	Mexico
7	Estonia
Bye
23	Brazil	155
10	Turkey	154
15	Puerto Rico	153
18	Chinese Taipei	156
Bye
2	Colombia

1/8 finals
1	India	156
16	Australia	152
9	United States	156^{19}
8	Poland	156^{18}
5	Netherlands	154
12	Great Britain	148
20	Malaysia	153
4	El Salvador	155
3	South Korea	156
14	Italy	157
11	Luxembourg	159
6	Mexico	157
7	Estonia	154
23	Brazil	150
18	Chinese Taipei	155^{19}
2	Colombia	155^{20}

Quarterfinals
1	India	153
9	United States	154
5	Netherlands	153
4	El Salvador	148
14	Italy	150
11	Luxembourg	156
7	Estonia	151
2	Colombia	154

Semifinals
9	United States	154
5	Netherlands	151
11	Luxembourg	153
2	Colombia	155

Final
9	United States	156
2	Colombia	154
Bronze medal
5	Netherlands	155
11	Luxembourg	156
