= 2023 World Archery Championships – Women's team recurve =

Archery competition

2023 World Archery Championships
Men	Recurve	Compound
Women	Recurve	Compound
Team	Men's recurve	Men's compound
Team	Women's recurve	Women's compound
Mixed team	Recurve	Compound

The women's team recurve competition at the 2023 World Archery Championships took place from 1 to 4 August in Berlin, Germany.

== Schedule ==
All times are Central European Summer Time (UTC+02:00).

Date	Time	Round
Tuesday, 1 August	09:30	Qualification round
Wednesday, 2 August	10:15; 10:45; 11:15	1/12 finals 1/8 finals Quarterfinals
Friday, 4 August	14:02; 14:59; 15:25	Semifinals; Bronze medal match Final

== Qualification round ==
Results after 216 arrows.

Rank	Nation	Name	Score
1	South Korea	An San; Kang Chae-young; Lim Si-hyeon	2013
2	China	An Qixuan; Hai Ligan; Zhang Mengyao	1960
3	Germany	Katharina Bauer; Michelle Kroppen; Charline Schwarz	1955
4	Ukraine	Solomiya Hnyp; Veronika Marchenko; Anastasia Pavlova	1950
5	Italy	Tatiana Andreoli; Lucilla Boari; Chiara Rebagliati	1942
6	Chinese Taipei	Chiu Yi-ching; Kuo Tzu-ying; Lei Chien-ying	1938
7	Mexico	Aida Román; Ángela Ruiz; Alejandra Valencia	1926
8	France	Audrey Adiceom; Lisa Barbelin; Caroline Lopez	1926
9	Great Britain	Penny Healey; Louisa Piper; Bryony Pitman	1925
10	Japan	Satsuki Noda; Tomomi Sugimoto; Azusa Yamauchi	1916
11	United States	Catalina GNoriega; Casey Kaufhold; Jennifer Mucino-Fernandez	1906
12	Netherlands	Quinty Roeffen; Gabriela Schloesser; Laura van der Winkel	1900
13	India	Bhajan Kaur; Ankita Bhakat; Simranjeet Kaur	1891
14	Spain	Elia Canales; Leyre Fernández; Irati Unamunzaga	1884
15	Poland	Karyna Kazlouskaya; Natalia Leśniak; Magdalena Śmiałkowska	1878
16	Denmark	Kirstine Danstrup Andersen; Randi Degn; Nanna Jakobsen	1877
17	Indonesia	Diananda Choirunisa; Anindya Nayla Putri; Alpriani Eka Setiowati	1862
18	Vietnam	Đỗ Thị Ánh Nguyệt; Hoàng Thị Mai; Nguyễn Thị Thanh Nhi	1855
19	Greece	Anatoli Gkorila; Dimitra Papadopoulou; Evangelia Psarra	1852
20	Kazakhstan	Alina Ilyassova; Alua Mukhtarkhanova; Medina Murat	1849
21	Brazil	Marina Canetta; Ane Marcelle dos Santos; Sarah Nikitin	1841
22	Georgia	Medea Gvinchidze alome Kharshiladze; Tsiko Putkaradze	1833
23	Turkey	Ezgi Başaran; Gülnaz Büşranur Coşkun; Fatma Maraşlı	1832
24	Malaysia	Ku Nurin Afiqah Ku Ruzaini; Syaqiera Mashayikh; Nurul Izzah Mazlan	1832
25	Canada	Stephanie Barrett; Virginie Chénier; Kristine Esebua	1830
26	Switzerland	Laura Amato; Franziska Langhammer; Liliana Licari	1802
27	Estonia	Bessi Kasak; Triinu Lilienthal; Reena Pärnat	1800
28	Slovenia	Urška Čavič; Žana Pintarič; Ana Umer	1798
29	Slovakia	Denisa Baránková; Elena Bendíková; Kristína Drusková	1790
30	Thailand	Sataporn Artsalee; Punika Jongkraijak; Narisara Khunhiranchaiyo	1789
31	Mongolia	Enkhtuya Altangerel; Bishindeegiin Urantungalag; Dagiijanchiv Jargalsaikhan	1765
32	Moldova	Kasandra Berzan; Nicoleta Clima; Alexandra Mîrca	1734
33	Finland	Gajane Bottinelli; Ida-Lotta Lassila; Iida Tukiainen	1651
34	Romania	Mădălina Amăistroaie; Andrada Caţavei; Beatrice Mikloș	1574
35	Iceland	Astrid Daxböck; Marín Hilmarsdóttir; Valgerður Hjaltested	1574

== Elimination round ==
=== Section 1 ===
1/12 finals
1	South Korea
Bye
17	Indonesia	5	49	56	54	49
16	Denmark	3	53	56	51	44
9	Great Britain	6	56	54	51
24	Malaysia	0	50	51	49
Bye
8	France
5	Italy
Bye
21	Brazil	4	54	49	52	51	27
12	Netherlands	5	45	53	51	55	27+
13	India	6	52	58	53	52
20	Kazakhstan	2	55	52	51	51
Bye
4	Ukraine

1/8 finals
1	South Korea	3	54	59	51	56
17	Indonesia	5	55	52	53	56
9	Great Britain	4	51	57	52	50	25
8	France	5	56	55	50	57	29
5	Italy	3	49	55	51	52
12	Netherlands	5	49	55	51	53
13	India	6	53	53	53
4	Ukraine	0	51	52	42

Quarterfinals
17	Indonesia	3	54	50	52	47
8	France	5	54	46	54	53
12	Netherlands	6	48	53	50	57
13	India	2	49	52	48	54

Semifinals
8	France	6	51	56	55
12	Netherlands	0	50	51	54

=== Section 2 ===
1/12 finals
3	Germany
Bye
19	Greece	2	46	51	52	48
14	Spain	6	52	55	51	54
11	United States	5	47	53	50	48	27
22	Georgia	4	49	45	49	50	26
Bye
6	Chinese Taipei
7	Mexico
Bye
23	Turkey	0	49	47	53
10	Japan	6	52	53	56
15	Poland	0	48	50	43
18	Vietnam	6	51	52	52
Bye
2	China

1/8 finals
3	Germany	5	53	56	52
14	Spain	1	53	54	48
11	United States	6	53	53	52	58
6	Chinese Taipei	0	47	49	55	51
7	Mexico	5	48	54	51	55
10	Japan	3	52	53	51	53
18	Vietnam	2	54	42	50	50
2	China	6	52	52	54	57

Quarterfinals
3	Germany	5	50	52	51	54
11	United States	3	48	52	53	51
7	Mexico	6	54	56	59
2	China	0	51	53	56

Semifinals
3	Germany	6	56	55	55
7	Mexico	0	45	54	53

== Final round ==
Semifinals
8	France	6	51	56	55
12	Netherlands	0	50	51	54
3	Germany	6	56	55	55
7	Mexico	0	45	54	53

Finals
8	France	3	53	52	58	56
3	Germany	5	53	55	50	57
Third place
12	Netherlands	3	56	54	57	54
7	Mexico	5	51	55	57	55
