= 2023 World Archery Championships – Women's individual recurve =

Archery competition

2023 World Archery Championships
Men	Recurve	Compound
Women	Recurve	Compound
Team	Men's recurve	Men's compound
Team	Women's recurve	Women's compound
Mixed team	Recurve	Compound

The women's individual recurve competition at the 2023 World Archery Championships took place from 1 to 6 August in Berlin, Germany.

== Schedule ==
All times are Central European Summer Time (UTC+02:00).

Date	Time	Round
Tuesday, 1 August	09:30	Qualification round
Thursday, 3 August	09:45; 10:30; 11:15; 11:55	1/48 finals 1/24 finals 1/16 finals 1/8 finals
Sunday, 6 August	10:02; 10:50; 11:19; 11:31	Quarterfinals; Semifinals; Bronze medal match Final

== Qualification round ==
Results after 72 arrows.

Rank	Name	Nation	Score	10+X	X
1	Alejandra Valencia	Mexico	675	36	8
2	Lim Si-hyeon	South Korea	675	34	9
3	Kang Chae-young	South Korea	672	29	13
4	An San	South Korea	666	31	11
5	Penny Healey	Great Britain	664	28	6
6	Diananda Choirunisa	Indonesia	660	29	10
7	Marie Horáčková	Czech Republic	658	25	8
8	Bryony Pitman	Great Britain	657	26	10
9	Kirstine Danstrup Andersen	Denmark	657	28	10
10	Anastasia Pavlova	Ukraine	656	26	9
11	An Qixuan	China	655	23	8
12	Michelle Kroppen	Germany	655	21	6
13	Katharina Bauer	Germany	654	27	10
14	Lisa Barbelin	France	654	26	7
15	Hai Ligan	China	654	24	6
16	Solomiya Hnyp	Ukraine	652	29	7
17	Zhang Mengyao	China	651	25	8
18	Tatiana Andreoli	Italy	651	22	5
19	Lei Chien-ying	Chinese Taipei	649	26	12
20	Elia Canales	Spain	649	26	7
21	Casey Kaufhold	United States	649	24	8
22	Noda Satsuki	Japan	649	22	6
23	Kuo Tzu-ying	Chinese Taipei	648	23	4
24	Tomomi Sugimoto	Japan	648	21	6
25	Chiara Rebagliati	Italy	646	23	9
26	Charline Schwarz	Germany	646	22	9
27	Lucilla Boari	Italy	645	17	4
28	Veronika Marchenko	Ukraine	642	21	5
29	Chiu Yi-ching	Chinese Taipei	641	23	6
30	Đỗ Thị Ánh Nguyệt	Vietnam	639	21	8
31	Ankita Bhakat	India	639	20	6
32	Caroline Lopez	France	639	18	4
33	Magdalena Śmiałkowska	Poland	638	22	8
34	Laura van der Winkel	Netherlands	638	19	5
35	Ana Rendón	Colombia	637	22	4
36	Quinty Roeffen	Netherlands	636	19	5
37	Elisabeth Straka	Austria	635	21	6
38	Audrey Adiceom	France	633	18	4
39	Jennifer Mucino-Fernandez	United States	632	20	5
40	Ángela Ruiz	Mexico	631	16	3
41	Denisa Baránková	Slovakia	628	18	6
42	Fatma Maraşlı	Turkey	628	18	4
43	Nguyễn Thị Thanh Nhi	Vietnam	627	23	5
44	Christine Bjerendal	Sweden	627	21	8
45	Bhajan Kaur	India	627	18	3
46	Anatoli Gkorila	Greece	626	20	8
47	Gabriela Schloesser	Netherlands	626	18	4
48	Mădălina Amăistroaie	Romania	625	19	9
49	Milana Tkachenko	Portugal	625	18	6
50	Catalina GNoriega	United States	625	18	5
51	Simranjeet Kaur	India	625	12	6
52	Virginie Chénier	Canada	623	23	6
53	Karyna Kazlouskaya	Poland	623	18	3
54	Elena Petrou	Cyprus	623	17	4
55	Kristine Esebua	Canada	623	16	1
56	Liliana Licari	Switzerland	622	21	7
57	Reena Pärnat	Estonia	620	18	5
58	Aida Román	Mexico	620	15	3
59	Alua Mukhtarkhanova	Kazakhstan	620	14	5
60	Azusa Yamauchi	Japan	619	10	3
61	Irati Unamunzaga	Spain	618	19	4
62	Dobromira Danailova	Bulgaria	618	18	4
63	Diya Siddique	Bangladesh	618	14	6
64	Alina Ilyassova	Kazakhstan	618	13	2
65	Marina Canetta	Brazil	617	17	8
66	Leyre Fernández	Spain	617	17	6
67	Natalia Leśniak	Poland	617	16	2
68	Ane Marcelle dos Santos	Brazil	616	12	4
69	Salome Kharshiladze	Georgia	615	16	5
70	Dimitra Papadopoulou	Greece	615	12	2
71	Žana Pintarič	Slovenia	614	11	6
72	Adriana Espinosa	Ecuador	613	17	9
73	Tsiko Putkaradze	Georgia	613	14	6
74	Nurul Izzah Mazlan	Malaysia	612	16	6
75	Randi Degn	Denmark	612	16	3
76	Syaqiera Mashayikh	Malaysia	612	11	5
77	Evangelia Psarra	Greece	611	19	7
78	Medina Murat	Kazakhstan	611	14	5
79	Javiera Andrades	Chile	609	13	3
80	Sarah Nikitin	Brazil	608	20	4
81	Triinu Lilienthal	Estonia	608	19	3
82	Ku Nurin Afiqah Ku Ruzaini	Malaysia	608	15	5
83	Fatima Huseynli	Azerbaijan	608	13	4
84	Ana Umer	Slovenia	608	12	4
85	Nanna Jakobsen	Denmark	608	9	5
86	Gülnaz Büşranur Coşkun	Turkey	607	15	5
87	Laura Paeglis	Australia	607	11	6
88	Medea Gvinchidze	Georgia	605	12	3
89	Alexandra Mîrca	Moldova	604	14	6
90	Louisa Piper	Great Britain	604	14	6
91	Punika Jongkraijak	Thailand	604	13	3
92	Bishindeegiin Urantungalag	Mongolia	604	7	5
93	Erika Jangnas	Sweden	603	15	3
94	Anindya Nayla Putri	Indonesia	603	12	0
95	Narisara Khunhiranchaiyo	Thailand	602	10	2
96	Enkhtuya Altangerel	Mongolia	601	12	2
97	Alpriani Eka Setiowati	Indonesia	599	10	6
98	Ezgi Başaran	Turkey	597	14	2
99	Anja Brkić	Serbia	596	16	6
100	Mikaella Moshe	Israel	596	12	3
101	Jindřiška Vaněk Vaněčková	Czech Republic	593	14	4
102	Franziska Langhammer	Switzerland	593	12	4
103	Paulina Ramanauskaitė	Lithuania	592	15	4
104	Cheng Yik Kiu	Hong Kong	592	15	4
105	Yaylagul Ramazanova	Azerbaijan	592	6	2
106	Elena Bendíková	Slovakia	591	11	2
107	Mayte Paredes	Bolivia	591	8	3
108	Tetiana Muntian	United States Virgin Islands	590	14	4
109	Hoàng Thị Mai	Vietnam	589	13	5
110	Shelley Hilton	Israel	589	12	2
111	Marín Hilmarsdóttir	Iceland	588	12	2
112	Laura Amato	Switzerland	587	10	3
113	Fatoumata Sylla	Guinea	586	10	3
114	Stephanie Barrett	Canada	584	10	4
115	Sataporn Artsalee	Thailand	583	9	4
116	Anne Abernathy	United States Virgin Islands	580	12	4
117	Iida Tukiainen	Finland	579	13	4
118	Rana Kamel	Egypt	577	10	5
119	Urška Čavič	Slovenia	576	13	2
120	Beatrice Mikloș	Romania	576	8	5
121	Kaining Ng	Singapore	576	8	2
122	Bessi Kasak	Estonia	572	12	6
123	Kristína Drusková	Slovakia	571	8	2
124	Kasandra Berzan	Moldova	570	8	1
125	Nada Azzam	Egypt	569	8	2
126	Kristina Pruccoli	San Marino	567	8	1
127	Nicoleta Clima	Moldova	560	12	2
128	Dagiijanchiv Jargalsaikhan	Mongolia	560	4	1
129	Ida-Lotta Lassila	Finland	556	7	3
130	Giorgia Cesarini	San Marino	549	4	0
131	Ekpobi Yedagne	Ivory Coast	546	8	3
132	Hussa Ahmed	United Arab Emirates	543	7	2
133	Esmei Diombo	Ivory Coast	541	8	2
134	Katarina Vranjković	Serbia	536	4	2
135	Valgerður Hjaltested	Iceland	531	6	0
136	Gajane Bottinelli	Finland	516	6	2
137	Lee Hiu Yau	Hong Kong	496	4	0
138	Lija Seibute	Latvia	491	3	2
139	Astrid Daxböck	Iceland	455	3	1
140	Andrada Caţavei	Romania	373	0	0

== Elimination round ==
=== Section 1 ===
1/48 finals
1	(Mexico) A Valencia
Bye
33	(Poland) M Śmiałkowska	2	25	25	24	25
80	(Brazil) S Nikitin	6	29	25	26	25
81	(Estonia) T Lilienthal	2	21	25	26	22
32	(France) C Lopez	6	29	25	26	25
17	(China) Zhang MY	6	26	26	26
96	(Mongolia) E Altangerel	0	24	25	22
65	(Brazil) M Canetta	3	24	23	22	28	9
48	(Romania) M Amăistroaie	7	28	27	21	28	25
49	(Portugal) M Tkachenko	0	23	24	23
64	(Kazakhstan) A Ilyassova	6	25	27	25
97	(Indonesia) AE Setiowati	1	24	20	25	21
16	(Ukraine) S Hnyp	7	29	25	25	26

1/24 finals
1	(Mexico) A Valencia
Bye
80	(Brazil) S Nikitin	3	26	23	20	29	20
32	(France) C Lopez	7	26	28	24	25	28
17	(China) Zhang MY	2	23	25	23	25
48	(Romania) M Amăistroaie	6	19	26	27	27
64	(Kazakhstan) A Ilyassova	6	28	28	26	27
16	(Ukraine) S Hnyp	2	22	24	27	25

1/16 finals
1	(Mexico) A Valencia	6	21	27	28	25	26
32	(France) C Lopez	4	24	26	27	26	25
48	(Romania) M Amăistroaie	6	25	22	25	23	26
64	(Kazakhstan) A Ilyassova	4	23	25	24	27	23

1/8 finals
1	(Mexico) A Valencia	6	25	28	17	27	29
48	(Romania) M Amăistroaie	4	24	13	27	28	27

=== Section 2 ===
1/48 finals
9	(Denmark) K Danstrup	6	22	21	25	24
104	(Hong Kong) Cheng YK	2	23	20	17	23
57	(Estonia) R Pärnat	4	22	28	17	13	17
56	(Switzerland) L Licari	6	19	24	25	24	23
41	(Slovakia) D Baránková	6	26	26	26
72	(Ecuador) A Espinosa	0	25	17	22
89	(Moldova) A Mîrca	5	24	21	25	26	23
24	(Japan) T Sugimoto	6	24	30	22	22	28
25	(Italy) C Rebagliati	6	25	26	25	26
88	(Georgia (country)) M Gvinchidze	2	23	27	22	21
73	(Georgia (country)) T Putkaradze	4	27	24	26	26	24
40	(Mexico) Á Ruiz	6	29	27	25	25	27
Bye
8	(United Kingdom) B Pitman

1/24 finals
9	(Denmark) K Danstrup	6	22	28	28
56	(Switzerland) L Licari	0	21	21	27
41	(Slovakia) D Baránková	4	23	29	25	25	22
24	(Japan) T Sugimoto	6	20	26	27	27	25
25	(Italy) C Rebagliati	6	18	27	26	27
40	(Mexico) Á Ruiz	2	29	26	24	26
Bye
8	(United Kingdom) B Pitman

1/16 finals
9	(Denmark) K Danstrup	1	20	24	25	24
24	(Japan) T Sugimoto	7	23	27	25	26
25	(Italy) C Rebagliati	6	22	28	28
8	(United Kingdom) B Pitman	0	19	26	24

1/8 finals
24	(Japan) T Sugimoto	6	29	26	23	27
25	(Italy) C Rebagliati	2	24	27	19	26

=== Section 3 ===
1/48 finals
5	(United Kingdom) P Healey
Bye
37	(Austria) E Straka	7	25	22	26	26
76	(Malaysia) S Mashayikh	1	24	22	21	20
85	(Denmark) N Jakobsen	3	23	20	24	26	17
28	(Ukraine) V Marchenko	7	25	24	24	23	29
21	(United States) C Kaufhold	7	28	26	26	28
92	(Mongolia) U Bishindeegiin	1	26	26	24	22
69	(Georgia (country)) S Kharshiladze	7	21	27	24	25	21
44	(Sweden) C Bjerendal	3	27	24	24	24	17
53	(Poland) K Kazlouskaya	0	23	23	17
60	(Japan) A Yamauchi	6	25	24	22
101	(Czech Republic) J Vaněk	7	25	25	22	22	25
12	(Germany) M Kroppen	3	23	24	22	27	18

1/24 finals
5	(United Kingdom) P Healey
Bye
37	(Austria) E Straka	3	25	25	29	26	19
28	(Ukraine) V Marchenko	7	26	25	29	26	25
21	(United States) C Kaufhold	6	27	24	27
69	(Georgia (country)) S Kharshiladze	0	22	23	26
6	(Japan) A Yamauchi	0	24	26	22
101	(Czech Republic) J Vaněk	6	27	27	24

1/16 finals
5	(United Kingdom) P Healey	6	27	21	27	28	26
28	(Ukraine) V Marchenko	4	30	25	25	27	25
21	(United States) C Kaufhold	6	26	28	29
101	(Czech Republic) J Vaněk	0	24	24	27

1/8 finals
5	(United Kingdom) P Healey	2	29	27	24	27
21	(United States) C Kaufhold	6	24	28	26	28

=== Section 4 ===
1/48 finals
13	(Germany) K Bauer	6	25	26	22	28
100	(Israel) M Moshe	2	21	19	25	23
61	(Spain) I Unamunzaga	6	29	27	22	23
52	(Canada) V Chénier	2	24	26	23	22
45	(India) B Kaur	6	25	26	22	28
68	(Brazil) AM dos Santos	2	28	23	19	26
93	(Sweden) E Jangnas	2	25	24	27	23
20	(Spain) E Canales	6	27	29	24	28
29	(Chinese Taipei) Chiu Y-c	0	20	21	23
84	(Slovenia) A Umer	6	29	26	25
77	(Greece) E Psarra	7	26	25	22	25	26
36	(Netherlands) Q Roeffen	3	26	21	20	26	14
Bye
4	(South Korea) An S

1/24 finals
13	(Germany) K Bauer	1	23	24	27	24
61	(Spain) I Unamunzaga	7	25	24	28	25
45	(India) B Kaur	1	22	26	15	21
20	(Spain) E Canales	7	26	26	27	23
84	(Slovenia) A Umer	2	16	25	27	24
77	(Greece) E Psarra	6	21	27	23	29
Bye
4	(South Korea) An S

1/16 finals
61	(Spain) I Unamunzaga	5	17	26	27	24	21
20	(Spain) E Canales	6	24	24	27	21	25
77	(Greece) E Psarra	0	13	22	25
4	(South Korea) An S	6	20	26	26

1/8 finals
20	(Spain) E Canales	5	25	28	23	27	27
4	(South Korea) An S	6	30	26	24	26	27

=== Section 5 ===
1/48 finals
3	(South Korea) Kang C-y
Bye
35	(Colombia) A Rendón	3	25	22	18	26	26
78	(Kazakhstan) M Murat	7	17	25	22	26	29
83	(Azerbaijan) F Huseynli	2	27	23	13	24
30	(Vietnam) Đỗ Thị Ánh N	6	24	26	14	28
19	(Chinese Taipei) Lei C-y	6	25	27	24
94	(Indonesia) AN Putri	0	21	22	23
67	(Poland) N Leśniak	6	23	25	15	28	21
46	(Greece) A Gkorila	4	26	23	23	24	17
51	(India) S Kaur	6	26	26	21	18	21
62	(Bulgaria) D Danailova	5	26	22	16	24	24
99	(Serbia) A Brkić	2	28	24	23	24
14	(France) L Barbelin	6	26	25	24	27

1/24 finals
3	(South Korea) Kang C-y
Bye
78	(Kazakhstan) M Murat	5	23	24	24	23	14
30	(Vietnam) Đỗ Thị Ánh N	6	16	23	29	23	24
19	(Chinese Taipei) Lei C-y	4	21	23	30	24	25
67	(Poland) N Leśniak	6	24	26	24	22	26
51	(India) S Kaur	6	24	26	20	17	24
14	(France) L Barbelin	4	23	24	24	25	21

1/16 finals
3	(South Korea) Kang C-y	6	25	20	28	29	26
30	(Vietnam) Đỗ Thị Ánh N	4	28	28	26	26	25
67	(Poland) N Leśniak	4	14	27	24	26	23
51	(India) S Kaur	6	20	26	23	27	25

1/8 finals
3	(South Korea) Kang C-y	6	29	27	27
51	(India) S Kaur	0	28	24	22

=== Section 6 ===
1/48 finals
11	(China) An QX	6	24	29	21
102	(Switzerland) F Langhammer	0	23	23	20
59	(Kazakhstan) A Mukhtarkhanova	6	25	26	23	26
54	(Cyprus) E Petrou	2	24	28	17	22
43	(Vietnam) Nguyễn Thị Thanh N	5	27	27	21	24	13
70	(Greece) D Papadopoulou	6	26	27	18	27	18
91	(Thailand) P Jongkraijak	4	22	24	28	20	11
22	(Japan) S Noda	6	26	23	19	28	26
27	(Italy) L Boari	6	28	26	26	26
86	(Turkey) G Coşkun	2	25	27	24	23
75	(Denmark) R Degn	7	25	26	24	25
38	(France) A Adiceom	1	23	20	24	24
Bye
6	(Indonesia) D Choirunisa

1/24 finals
11	(China) An QX	6	24	29	23	27
59	(Kazakhstan) A Mukhtarkhanova	2	21	25	25	23
70	(Greece) D Papadopoulou	4	22	25	24	26	24
22	(Japan) S Noda	6	25	23	21	28	27
27	(Italy) L Boari	7	15	26	25	22
75	(Denmark) R Degn	1	13	26	23	21
Bye
6	(Indonesia) D Choirunisa

1/16 finals
11	(China) An QX	4	24	25	26	28	25
22	(Japan) S Noda	6	22	29	28	27	26
27	(Italy) L Boari	4	25	27	27	27	23
6	(Indonesia) D Choirunisa	6	23	27	28	27	25

1/8 finals
22	(Japan) S Noda	6	26	26	26	29
6	(Indonesia) D Choirunisa	2	26	23	26	25

=== Section 7 ===
1/48 finals
7	(Czech Republic) M Horáčková
Bye
39	(United States) J Mucino-Fernandez	6	26	25	27
74	(Malaysia) NI Mazlan	0	21	18	22
87	(Australia) L Paeglis	4	26	27	24	23	22
26	(Germany) C Schwarz	6	24	28	23	25	24
23	(Chinese Taipei) Kuo T-y	4	27	26	21	24	25
90	(United Kingdom) L Piper	6	26	26	23	27	25
71	(Slovenia) Ž Pintarič	6	24	25	22	30
42	(Turkey) F Maraşlı	4	24	22	22	26
55	(Canada) K Esebua	6	22	21	26	27	27
58	(Mexico) A Román	4	21	22	27	25	18
103	(Lithuania) P Ramanauskaitė	0	20	23	20
10	(Ukraine) A Pavlova	6	25	27	23

1/24 finals
7	(Czech Republic) M Horáčková
Bye
39	(United States) J Mucino-Fernandez	2	22	27	22	21
26	(Germany) C Schwarz	6	27	24	24	24
90	(United Kingdom) L Piper	4	23	24	20	22	20
71	(Slovenia) Ž Pintarič	6	22	21	27	29	26
55	(Canada) K Esebua	7	22	28	25	23
10	(Ukraine) A Pavlova	1	22	27	22	21

1/16 finals
7	(Czech Republic) M Horáčková	6	14	27	27	29
26	(Germany) C Schwarz	2	27	25	24	26
71	(Slovenia) Ž Pintarič	6	20	24	28	30
55	(Canada) K Esebua	2	21	21	25	27

1/8 finals
7	(Czech Republic) M Horáčková	6	27	25	22	27	24
71	(Slovenia) Ž Pintarič	4	26	25	26	25	24

=== Section 8 ===
1/48 finals
15	(China) Hai LG	2	27	25	27	25
98	(Turkey) E Başaran	6	24	27	28	27
63	(Bangladesh) D Siddique	2	28	22	21	26
50	(United States) C GNoriega	6	25	23	24	27
47	(Netherlands) G Schloesser	6	24	25	24
66	(Spain) L Fernández	0	23	20	22
95	(Thailand) N Khunhiranchaiyo	1	24	25	18	17
18	(Italy) T Andreoli	7	26	25	24	25
31	(India) A Bhakat	2	27	21	17	24
82	(Malaysia) KNA Ku Ruzaini	6	24	26	24	27
79	(Chile) J Andrades	3	23	21	24	23	22
34	(Netherlands) L van der Winkel	7	27	27	22	23	28
Bye
2	(South Korea) Lim S-h

1/24 finals
98	(Turkey) E Başaran	0	24	22	25
50	(United States) C GNoriega	6	27	26	27
47	(Netherlands) G Schloesser	6	26	27	26
18	(Italy) T Andreoli	0	24	23	17
82	(Malaysia) KNA Ku Ruzaini	6	22	18	29	27	20
34	(Netherlands) L van der Winkel	5	18	27	24	27	27
Bye
2	(South Korea) Lim S-h

1/16 finals
50	(United States) C GNoriega	3	23	23	27	27	26
47	(Netherlands) G Schloesser	7	23	25	23	29	30
82	(Malaysia) KNA Ku Ruzaini	2	24	23	21	25
2	(South Korea) Lim S-h	6	22	26	29	28

1/8 finals
47	(Netherlands) G Schloesser	0	23	24	21
2	(South Korea) Lim S-h	6	26	28	27

== Final round ==
Quarterfinals
1	(Mexico) Alejandra Valencia	7	28	29	28	29
24	(Japan) Tomomi Sugimoto	1	27	26	28	28
21	(United States) Casey Kaufhold	6	29	28	28	29	29
4	(South Korea) An San	4	28	27	28	30	29
3	(South Korea) Kang Chae-young	5^{10}	26	28	29	28	28
22	(Japan) Satsuki Noda	6^{10+}	27	29	27	28	27
7	(Czech Republic) Marie Horáčková	6	29	29	29
2	(South Korea) Lim Si-hyeon	0	27	28	28

Semifinals
1	(Mexico) Alejandra Valencia	6^{10}	30	27	25	27	29
21	(United States) Casey Kaufhold	5^{9}	28	29	27	27	28
22	(Japan) Satsuki Noda	0	27	27	28
7	(Czech Republic) Marie Horáčková	6	29	30	29

Finals
1	(Mexico) Alejandra Valencia	0	28	27	27
7	(Czech Republic) Marie Horáčková	6	29	28	29
Third place
21	(United States) Casey Kaufhold	2	26	27	27	24
22	(Japan) Satsuki Noda	6	28	29	26	27
