= 2023 World Archery Championships – Men's team compound =

Archery competition

2023 World Archery Championships
Men	Recurve	Compound
Women	Recurve	Compound
Team	Men's recurve	Men's compound
Team	Women's recurve	Women's compound
Mixed team	Recurve	Compound

The men's team compound competition at the 2023 World Archery Championships took place from 1 to 4 August in Berlin, Germany.

== Schedule ==
All times are Central European Summer Time (UTC+02:00).

Date	Time	Round
Tuesday, 1 August	14:00	Qualification round
Wednesday, 2 August	16:15; 16:45; 17:15; 17:45	1/12 finals 1/8 finals Quarterfinals; Semifinals
Friday, 4 August	11:06; 11:32	Bronze medal match Final

== Qualification round ==
Results after 216 arrows.

Rank	Nation	Name	Score
1	South Korea	Choi Yong-hee; Kim Jong-ho; Yang Jae-won	2096
2	Denmark	Tore Bjarnarson; Martin Damsbo; Mathias Fullerton	2094
3	India	Ojas Deotale; Prathamesh Jawkar; Abhishek Verma	2094
4	Turkey	Batuhan Akçaoğlu; Emircan Haney; Yakup Yıldız	2091
5	Poland	Rafał Dobrowolski; Przemysław Konecki; Łukasz Przybylski	2081
6	United States	Nick Kappers; Kris Schaff; Sawyer Sullivan	2081
7	Colombia	Sebastián Arenas; Daniel Muñoz; Jagdeep Singh	2080
8	Austria	Stefan Heincz; Michael Matzner; Nico Wiener	2080
9	Italy	Marco Bruno; Elia Fregnan; Federico Pagnoni	2076
10	Slovenia	Aljaž Brenk; Tim Jevšnik; Staš Modic	2073
11	Netherlands	Sil Pater; Mike Schloesser; Jay Tjin-A-Djie	2071
12	El Salvador	Roberto Hernández; Douglas Nolasco; Miguel Veliz	2068
13	Chinese Taipei	Chen Chieh-lun; Pan Yu-ping; Yang Cheng-jui	2061
14	France	Jean-Philippe Boulch; Nicolas Girard; Adrien Gontier	2059
15	Australia	Brandon Hawes; Robert Timms; Bailey Wildman	2057
16	Israel	Paz Carmi; Yiftach Hadar; Shamai Yamrom	2056
17	South Africa	Seppie Cilliers; Patrick Roux; Hendre Verhoef	2056
18	Mexico	Miguel Becerra; Juan del Río; Sebastián García	2054
19	Malaysia	Mohd Juwaidi Mazuki; Mohamad Md Ariffin; Alang Muhammad Ghazali	2054
20	Germany	Florian Grafmans; Sebastian Hamdorf; Leon Hollas	2053
21	Sweden	Jacob Benschjöld; Alexander Kullberg; Joakim Limås	2050
22	Slovakia	Jozef Bošanský; Matúš Durný; Šimon Šedivý	2047
23	Great Britain	Adam Carpenter; Dillon Crow; Kai Thomas-Prause	2037
24	Canada	Andrew Fagan; Cameron Palichuk; Tristan Spicer-Moran	2037
25	Kazakhstan	Akbarali Karabayev; Bunyod Mirzametov; Andrey Tyutyun	2035
26	Norway	Sander Figved; Mads Haugseth; Håkon Jenssen	2023
27	Thailand	Sirapop Chainak; Nitiphum Chatachot; Ratanadanai Wongtana	2012
28	Finland	Jere Forsberg; Antti Peltoniemi; Matti Tella	2001
29	Hong Kong	Lin Hung Hing; Sze Sing Yu; Wong Tze Ling	1997
30	Czech Republic	Filip Reitmeier; Martin Vaněk; Pavel Zaoral	1986
31	Lithuania	Jonas Grigaravičius; Marius Grigaravičius; Vilius Švedas	1980
32	Faroe Islands	Jógvan Niclasen; Samuel Petersen; Jóannes Poulsen	1959
33	Saudi Arabia	Abdullah Al-Abdullatif; Belal Al-Awadi; Abdulaziz Al-Rodhan	1948

== Elimination round ==
1/12 finals
1	South Korea
Bye
17	South Africa	230
16	Israel	227
9	Italy	232^{29}
24	Canada	232^{26}
Bye
8	Austria
5	Poland
Bye
21	Sweden	229
12	El Salvador	234
13	Chinese Taipei	234
20	Germany	224
Bye
4	Turkey
3	India
Bye
19	Malaysia	225
14	France	237
11	Netherlands	237
22	Slovakia	231
Bye
6	United States
7	Colombia
Bye
23	Great Britain	223
10	Slovenia	227
15	Australia	230
18	Mexico	227
Bye
2	Denmark

1/8 finals
1	South Korea	231
17	South Africa	218
9	Italy	236
8	Austria	232
5	Poland	233
12	El Salvador	230
13	Chinese Taipei	229
4	Turkey	227
3	India	233
14	France	230
11	Netherlands	230
6	United States	228
7	Colombia	226
10	Slovenia	230
15	Australia	227
2	Denmark	233

Quarterfinals
1	South Korea	236
9	Italy	230
5	Poland	235
13	Chinese Taipei	232
3	India	230
11	Netherlands	235
10	Slovenia	229
2	Denmark	233

Semifinals
1	South Korea	229
5	Poland	233
11	Netherlands	227^{28}
2	Denmark	227^{29}

Final
5	Poland	233^{30+}
2	Denmark	233^{30}
Bronze medal
1	South Korea	231
11	Netherlands	235
