= 2023 World Archery Championships – Men's individual compound =

Archery competition

2023 World Archery Championships
Men	Recurve	Compound
Women	Recurve	Compound
Team	Men's recurve	Men's compound
Team	Women's recurve	Women's compound
Mixed team	Recurve	Compound

The men's individual compound competition at the 2023 World Archery Championships took place from 1 to 5 August in Berlin, Germany.

== Schedule ==
All times are Central European Summer Time (UTC+02:00).

Date	Time	Round
Tuesday, 1 August	14:00	Qualification round
Thursday, 3 August	14:15; 15:00; 15:45; 16:25	1/48 finals 1/24 finals 1/16 finals 1/8 finals
Saturday, 5 August	14:02; 14:50; 15:19; 15:31	Quarterfinals; Semifinals; Bronze medal match Final

== Qualification round ==
Results after 72 arrows.

Rank	Name	Nation	Score	10+X	X
1	Emircan Haney	Turkey	709	61	32
2	Mike Schloesser	Netherlands	705	58	33
3	Przemysław Konecki	Poland	704	57	23
4	Kim Jong-ho	South Korea	703	56	26
5	Nico Wiener	Austria	703	56	22
6	Ojas Deotale	India	702	54	25
7	Mathias Fullerton	Denmark	701	55	33
8	Łukasz Przybylski	Poland	700	55	21
9	Jozef Bošanský	Slovakia	700	55	26
10	Robin Jäätma	Estonia	700	54	26
11	Roberto Hernández	El Salvador	700	54	24
12	Brandon Hawes	Australia	700	52	19
13	Tore Bjarnarson	Denmark	699	54	28
14	Prathamesh Jawkar	India	699	53	24
15	Yang Jae-won	South Korea	699	53	23
16	Domagoj Buden	Croatia	699	52	22
17	Tim Jevšnik	Slovenia	699	52	19
18	Sebastián Arenas	Colombia	698	53	27
19	Mario Vavro	Croatia	696	53	22
20	Shamai Yamrom	Israel	696	51	30
21	Sawyer Sullivan	United States	695	49	28
22	Gilles Seywert	Luxembourg	695	48	23
23	Choi Yong-hee	South Korea	694	51	22
24	Kris Schaff	United States	694	50	21
25	Sebastián García	Mexico	694	49	23
26	Martin Damsbo	Denmark	694	49	13
27	Federico Pagnoni	Italy	694	48	24
28	Mohd Juwaidi Mazuki	Malaysia	694	46	19
29	Abhishek Verma	India	693	47	21
30	Hendre Verhoef	South Africa	693	47	18
31	Batuhan Akçaoğlu	Turkey	692	48	24
32	Nick Kappers	United States	692	47	24
33	Adrien Gontier	France	692	46	18
34	Aljaž Brenk	Slovenia	692	46	10
35	Stefan Heincz	Austria	692	45	18
36	Adam Carpenter	Great Britain	692	45	15
37	Alexander Kullberg	Sweden	691	50	23
38	Jagdeep Singh	Colombia	691	48	20
39	Daniel Muñoz	Colombia	691	46	28
40	Marco Bruno	Italy	691	46	16
41	Elia Fregnan	Italy	691	45	13
42	Luccas Abreu	Brazil	690	48	21
43	Jay Tjin-A-Djie	Netherlands	690	47	20
44	Yakup Yıldız	Turkey	690	46	24
45	Andrey Tyutyun	Kazakhstan	690	46	24
46	Leon Hollas	Germany	690	43	15
47	Jean Pizarro	Puerto Rico	689	45	21
48	Chen Chieh-lun	Chinese Taipei	689	45	18
49	Yiftach Hadar	Israel	689	44	19
50	Yang Cheng-jui	Chinese Taipei	689	44	14
51	Cameron Palichuk	Canada	688	44	19
52	Ognjen Nedeljković	Serbia	688	43	16
53	Quinten Van Looy	Belgium	688	42	25
54	Nicolas Girard	France	686	45	19
55	Miguel Veliz	El Salvador	686	43	13
56	Patrick Roux	South Africa	686	42	19
57	Robert Timms	Australia	685	42	16
58	Michael Matzner	Austria	685	42	14
59	Mohammad Ashikuzzaman	Bangladesh	685	41	18
60	Jonas Grigaravičius	Lithuania	684	45	19
61	Jóannes Poulsen	Faroe Islands	684	44	19
62	Miguel Becerra	Mexico	684	44	15
63	Sebastian Hamdorf	Germany	684	37	13
64	Matti Tella	Finland	683	40	13
65	Pan Yu-ping	Chinese Taipei	683	39	16
66	Staš Modic	Slovenia	682	43	16
67	Douglas Nolasco	El Salvador	682	39	21
68	Jean-Philippe Boulch	France	681	40	22
69	Jacob Benschjöld	Sweden	681	38	13
70	Tristan Spicer-Moran	Canada	681	36	14
71	Mohamad Md Ariffin	Malaysia	681	35	19
72	Sander Figved	Norway	679	40	13
73	Florian Grafmans	Germany	679	38	17
74	Alang Muhammad Ghazali	Malaysia	679	35	15
75	Dillon Crow	Great Britain	678	37	13
76	Joakim Limås	Sweden	678	36	9
77	Ramón López	Spain	678	35	14
78	Rafał Dobrowolski	Poland	677	38	16
79	Arnaud Hocevar	Luxembourg	677	35	13
80	Seppie Cilliers	South Africa	677	35	9
81	Mads Haugseth	Norway	676	40	13
82	Šimon Šedivý	Slovakia	676	35	8
83	Juan del Río	Mexico	676	33	15
84	Sil Pater	Netherlands	676	33	13
85	Nitiphum Chatachot	Thailand	675	33	9
86	Ratanadanai Wongtana	Thailand	674	40	12
87	Sze Sing Yu	Hong Kong	674	34	18
88	Abdulaziz Al-Rodhan	Saudi Arabia	674	34	17
89	Akbarali Karabayev	Kazakhstan	674	33	10
90	Bailey Wildman	Australia	672	38	13
91	Nuno Simões	Portugal	671	45	24
92	Bunyod Mirzametov	Kazakhstan	671	35	10
93	Paz Carmi	Israel	671	34	10
94	Matúš Durný	Slovakia	671	34	9
95	Martin Vaněk	Czech Republic	671	33	14
96	Wong Tze Ling	Hong Kong	670	34	11
97	Ahmed Fakhry	Egypt	669	36	13
98	Andrew Fagan	Canada	668	32	14
99	Håkon Jenssen	Norway	668	32	13
100	Belal Al-Awadi	Saudi Arabia	668	30	8
101	Kai Thomas-Prause	Great Britain	667	35	11
102	Juan Vargas	Chile	667	30	14
103	Pavel Zaoral	Czech Republic	667	30	11
104	Marius Grigaravičius	Lithuania	667	30	11
105	Woon Teng Ng	Singapore	666	35	13
106	Stefan Žikić	Serbia	666	30	6
107	Rui Pereira	Portugal	666	28	14
108	Sirapop Chainak	Thailand	663	29	8
109	Victor Canalejas	Switzerland	662	31	10
110	Jere Forsberg	Finland	659	31	13
111	Antti Peltoniemi	Finland	659	29	10
112	Roman Häfelfinger	Switzerland	658	31	8
113	Lin Hung Hing	Hong Kong	653	26	6
114	Evert Ressar	Estonia	651	29	10
115	Mohammed Bin Amro	United Arab Emirates	651	26	10
116	Alfreð Birgisson	Iceland	650	20	10
117	Filip Reitmeier	Czech Republic	648	25	7
118	Jógvan Niclasen	Faroe Islands	640	19	9
119	Samuel Petersen	Faroe Islands	635	22	11
120	Vilius Švedas	Lithuania	629	20	7
121	Abdullah Al-Abdullatif	Saudi Arabia	606	18	6

== Final round ==
Quarterfinals
1	(Turkey) Emircan Haney	144
8	(Poland) Łukasz Przybylski	148
37	(Sweden) Alexander Kullberg	147
4	(South Korea) Kim Jong-ho	149
3	(Poland) Przemysław Konecki	144
6	(India) Ojas Deotale	148
26	(Denmark) Martin Damsbo	147
2	(Netherlands) Mike Schloesser	148

Semifinals
8	(Poland) Łukasz Przybylski	149
4	(South Korea) Kim Jong-ho	148
6	(India) Ojas Deotale	149
2	(Netherlands) Mike Schloesser	148

Finals
8	(Poland) Łukasz Przybylski	149
6	(India) Ojas Deotale	150
Third place
4	(South Korea) Kim Jong-ho	147
2	(Netherlands) Mike Schloesser	148

== Elimination round ==
=== Section 1 ===
1/48 finals
1	(Turkey) E Haney
Bye
33	(France) A Gontier	139
80	(South Africa) S Cilliers	140
81	(Norway) M Haugseth	137
32	(United States) N Kappers	143
17	(Slovenia) T Jevšnik	142
96	(Hong Kong) Wong TL	135
65	(Chinese Taipei) Pan Y-p	138
48	(Chinese Taipei) Chen C-l	133
49	(Israel) Y Hadar	130
64	(Finland) M Tella	134
97	(Egypt) A Fakhry	128
16	(Croatia) D Buden	144

1/24 finals
1	(Turkey) E Haney
Bye
80	(South Africa) S Cilliers	140
32	(United States) N Kappers	141
5	(Slovenia) T Jevšnik	140
65	(Chinese Taipei) Pan Y-p	138
64	(Finland) M Tella	138
16	(Croatia) D Buden	133

1/16 finals
1	(Turkey) E Haney	138
32	(United States) N Kappers	136
5	(Slovenia) T Jevšnik	142
64	(Finland) M Tella	140

1/8 finals
1	(Turkey) E Haney	147
5	(Slovenia) T Jevšnik	144

=== Section 2 ===
1/48 finals
9	(Slovakia) J Bošanský	139
104	(Lithuania) M Grigaravičius	128
57	(Australia) R Timms	139
56	(South Africa) P Roux	134
41	(Italy) E Fregnan	139
72	(Norway) S Figved	130
89	(Kazakhstan) A Karabayev	134
24	(United States) K Schaff	139
25	(Mexico) S García	134
88	(Saudi Arabia) A Al-Rodhan	122
73	(Germany) F Grafmans	132
40	(Italy) M Bruno	139
Bye
8	(Poland) Ł Przybylski

1/24 finals
9	(Slovakia) J Bošanský	138
57	(Australia) R Timms	138
41	(Italy) E Fregnan	138
24	(United States) K Schaff	139
25	(Mexico) S García	136
40	(Italy) M Bruno	125
Bye
8	(Poland) Ł Przybylski

1/16 finals
9	(Slovakia) J Bošanský	146
24	(United States) K Schaff	142
25	(Mexico) S García	137
8	(Poland) Ł Przybylski	141

1/8 finals
9	(Slovakia) J Bošanský	144
8	(Poland) Ł Przybylski	145

=== Section 3 ===
1/48 finals
5	(Austria) N Wiener
Bye
37	(Sweden) A Kullberg	139
76	(Sweden) J Limås	134
85	(Thailand) N Chatachot	135
28	(Malaysia) MJ Mazuki	138
21	(United States) S Sullivan	143
92	(Kazakhstan) B Mirzametov	133
69	(Sweden) J Benschjöld	138
44	(Turkey) Y Yıldız	138
53	(Belgium) Q Van Looy	140
60	(Lithuania) J Grigaravičius	131
101	(United Kingdom) K Thomas-Prause	137
12	(Australia) B Hawes	136

1/24 finals
5	(Austria) N Wiener
Bye
37	(Sweden) A Kullberg	146
28	(Malaysia) MJ Mazuki	134
21	(United States) S Sullivan	140
44	(Turkey) Y Yıldız	141
53	(Belgium) Q Van Looy	142
101	(United Kingdom) K Thomas-Prause	139

1/16 finals
5	(Austria) N Wiener	135
37	(Sweden) A Kullberg	143
44	(Turkey) Y Yıldız	146
53	(Belgium) Q Van Looy	142

1/8 finals
37	(Sweden) A Kullberg	148
44	(Turkey) Y Yıldız	146

=== Section 4 ===
1/48 finals
13	(Denmark) T Bjarnarson	139
100	(Saudi Arabia) B Al-Awadi	134
61	(Faroe Islands) J Poulsen	136
52	(Serbia) O Nedeljković	138
45	(Kazakhstan) A Tyutyun	125
68	(France) J-P Boulch	138
93	(Israel) P Carmi	135
20	(Israel) S Yamrom	145
29	(India) A Verma	132
84	(Netherlands) S Pater	140
77	(Spain) Ramón López	128
36	(United Kingdom) A Carpenter	136
Bye
4	(South Korea) Kim J-h

1/24 finals
13	(Denmark) T Bjarnarson	138
52	(Serbia) O Nedeljković	138
68	(France) J-P Boulch	139
20	(Israel) S Yamrom	140
84	(Netherlands) S Pater	134
36	(United Kingdom) A Carpenter	136
Bye
4	(South Korea) Kim J-h

1/16 finals
52	(Serbia) O Nedeljković	137
20	(Israel) S Yamrom	140
36	(United Kingdom) A Carpenter	137
4	(South Korea) Kim J-h	137

1/8 finals
20	(Israel) S Yamrom	145
4	(South Korea) Kim J-h	147

=== Section 5 ===
1/48 finals
3	(Poland) P Konecki
Bye
35	(Austria) S Heincz	137
78	(Poland) R Dobrowolski	122
83	(Mexico) J del Río	139
30	(South Africa) H Verhoef	134
19	(Croatia) M Vavro	135
94	(Slovakia) M Durný	124
67	(El Salvador) D Nolasco	141
46	(Germany) L Hollas	140
51	(Canada) C Palichuk	140
62	(Mexico) M Becerra	144
99	(Norway) H Jenssen	137
14	(India) P Jawkar	141

1/24 finals
3	(Poland) P Konecki
Bye
35	(Austria) S Heincz	138
83	(Mexico) J del Río	140
19	(Croatia) M Vavro	137
67	(El Salvador) D Nolasco	131
62	(Mexico) M Becerra	137
14	(India) P Jawkar	140

1/16 finals
3	(Poland) P Konecki	141
83	(Mexico) J del Río	139
19	(Croatia) M Vavro	143
14	(India) P Jawkar	143

1/8 finals
3	(Poland) P Konecki	147
19	(Croatia) M Vavro	146

=== Section 6 ===
1/48 finals
11	(El Salvador) R Hernández	141
102	(Chile) J Vargas	116
59	(Bangladesh) M Ashikuzzaman	136
54	(France) N Girard	125
43	(Netherlands) J Tjin-A-Djie	145
70	(Canada) T Spicer-Moran	141
91	(Portugal) N Simões	132
22	(Luxembourg) G Seywert	137
27	(Italy) F Pagnoni	142
86	(Thailand) R Wongtana	133
75	(United Kingdom) D Crow	134
38	(Colombia) J Singh	131
Bye
6	(India) O Deotale

1/24 finals
11	(El Salvador) R Hernández	141
59	(Bangladesh) M Ashikuzzaman	141
43	(Netherlands) J Tjin-A-Djie	142
22	(Luxembourg) G Seywert	137
27	(Italy) F Pagnoni	139
75	(United Kingdom) D Crow	135
Bye
6	(India) O Deotale

1/16 finals
59	(Bangladesh) M Ashikuzzaman	140
43	(Netherlands) J Tjin-A-Djie	134
27	(Italy) F Pagnoni	135
6	(India) O Deotale	136

1/8 finals
59	(Bangladesh) M Ashikuzzaman	138
6	(India) O Deotale	144

=== Section 7 ===
1/48 finals
7	(Denmark) M Fullerton
Bye
39	(Colombia) D Muñoz	141
74	(Malaysia) A Muhammad	136
87	(Hong Kong) Sze SY	138
26	(Denmark) M Damsbo	141
23	(South Korea) Choi Y-h	139
90	(Australia) B Wildman	126
71	(Malaysia) M Md Ariffin	134
42	(Brazil) L Abreu	140
55	(El Salvador) M Veliz	139
58	(Austria) M Matzner	141
103	(Czech Republic) P Zaoral	131
10	(Estonia) R Jäätma	145

1/24 finals
7	(Denmark) M Fullerton
Bye
39	(Colombia) D Muñoz	136
26	(Denmark) M Damsbo	143
23	(South Korea) Choi Y-h	140
42	(Brazil) L Abreu	142
58	(Austria) M Matzner	142
10	(Estonia) R Jäätma	142

1/16 finals
7	(Denmark) M Fullerton	137
26	(Denmark) M Damsbo	137
42	(Brazil) L Abreu	135
10	(Estonia) R Jäätma	142

1/8 finals
26	(Denmark) M Damsbo	145
10	(Estonia) R Jäätma	144

=== Section 8 ===
1/48 finals
15	(South Korea) Yang J-w	140
98	(Canada) A Fagan	140
63	(Germany) S Hamdorf	126
50	(Chinese Taipei) Yang C-j	136
47	(Puerto Rico) J Pizarro	138
66	(Slovenia) S Modic	139
95	(Czech Republic) M Vaněk	135
18	(Colombia) S Arenas	140
31	(Turkey) B Akçaoğlu	141
82	(Slovakia) Š Šedivý	137
79	(Luxembourg) A Hocevar	133
34	(Slovenia) A Brenk	133
Bye
2	(Netherlands) M Schloesser

1/24 finals
98	(Canada) A Fagan	140
50	(Chinese Taipei) Yang C-j	140
66	(Slovenia) S Modic	134
18	(Colombia) S Arenas	137
31	(Turkey) B Akçaoğlu	138
34	(Slovenia) A Brenk	139
Bye
2	(Netherlands) M Schloesser

1/16 finals
98	(Canada) A Fagan	140
18	(Colombia) S Arenas	139
34	(Slovenia) A Brenk	138
2	(Netherlands) M Schloesser	142

1/8 finals
98	(Canada) A Fagan	142
2	(Netherlands) M Schloesser	149
