= 2025 World Archery Championships – Mixed team compound =

Mixed team compound at the 2025 World Archery Championships
- Venue: Gwangju International Archery Center
- Location: Gwangju, South Korea
- Dates: 6–7 September
- Competitors: 88 from 44 nations

Medalists
gold medal	Sanne de Laat; Mike Schloesser	Netherlands
silver medal	Jyothi Surekha Vennam; Rishabh Yadav	India
bronze medal	Andrea Becerra; Sebastián García	Mexico

The mixed's team compound competition at the 2025 World Archery Championships, which will take place from 6 to 7 September 2025 in Gwangju, South Korea.

== Schedule ==
All times are in Korea Standard Time (UTC+09:00).

Date	Time	Round
Friday, 5 September		Official practice
Saturday, 6 September	09:00; 16:45; 17:10; 17:35; 18:00	Qualification round First Round; Second round Quarterfinals; Semifinals
Sunday, 7 September	14:05; 14:24	Bronze-medal match Gold-medal match

== Qualification round ==
Results after 144 arrows. The highest scoring (non-nominative) of each gender is taken from a nation entering at least a man and woman. The top 24 teams qualified to Elimination round.

High green denotes at least one round bye.
Light green denotes entering from first round.

Rank	Nation	Name	Score
1	South Korea	So Chae-won; Kim Jong-ho	1422
2	Denmark	Tanja Gellenthien; Mathias Fullerton	1417
3	Mexico	Andrea Becerra; Sebastián García	1417
4	India	Jyothi Surekha Vennam; Rishabh Yadav	1416
5	Turkey	Begüm Yuva; Emircan Haney	1415
6	Great Britain	Ella Gibson; Ajay Scott	1412
7	United States	Olivia Dean; Curtis Broadnax	1411
8	Chinese Taipei	Huang I-jou; Chang Cheng-wei	1410
9	Italy	Elisa Roner; Michea Godano	1408
10	Netherlands	Sanne de Laat; Mike Schloesser	1407
11	Estonia	Lisell Jäätma; Robin Jäätma	1406
12	El Salvador	Sofía Paiz; Roberto Hernández	1402
13	Indonesia	Yurike Nina Bonita Pereira; Prima Wisnu Wardhana	1402
14	France	Léa Girault; Nicolas Girard	1400
15	Kazakhstan	Roxana Yunussova; Andrey Tyutyun	1398
16	Colombia	Alejandra Usquiano; Daniel Muñoz	1398
17	Brazil	Bianca Rodrigues; Jairo Rodrigo da Silva	1396
18	Vietnam	Nguyễn Thị Kim Anh; Nguyễn Trung Chiến	1396
19	Poland	Sandra Jankowska; Przemysław Konecki	1394
20	Germany	Katharina Raab; Paolo Kunsch	1393
21	Malaysia	Fatin Nurfatehah Mat Salleh; Mohd Juwaidi Mazuki	1392
22	Croatia	Amanda Mlinarić; Domagoj Buden	1391
23	Puerto Rico	Paola Ramírez; Jean Pizarro	1391
24	Australia	Rhiannon Mills; Brandon Hawes	1390
25	Sweden	Jennifer Winsenne; Jacob Benschjöld	1389
26	Spain	Andrea Muñoz; Álvaro Pardo	1387
27	South Africa	Jeanine van Kradenburg; Hendre Verhoef	1383
28	Bangladesh	Most Kulsum Akther Mone; Himu Bachhar	1382
29	Canada	Bryanne Lameg; Jordan Adachi	1382
30	China	Li Mingxing; Wang Jiuyi	1382
31	Lithuania	Inga Timinskienė; Jonas Grigaravičius	1380
32	Philippines	Amaya Amparo Cojuangco; Paul Marton De La Cruz	1376
33	Austria	Andrea Ratzer; Nico Wiener	1376
34	Singapore	Eer Jiang Ying; Madeleine Ong	1374
35	Israel	Alma Ifergan; Shamai Yamrom	1369
36	Slovakia	Lívia Orihelová; Jozef Bošanský	1366
37	Chile	Aurora Olea Prado; Fabián Seymour Bosso	1358
38	Ukraine	Kseniia Shkliar; Karpenko Sviatoslav	1357
39	Czech Republic	Martina Zikmundová; Martin Vanek	1355
40	Iraq	Fatimah Saad Almashhadani; Eshaq Al Daghman	1355
41	Japan	Sayaka Kamoda; Ryo Takamune	1349
42	Hong Kong	Cheng Hung Ting; Ngai Ho Chun Justin	1348
43	Iceland	Anna Alfreðsdóttir; Alfreð Birgisson	1338
44	Macau	Cheong Ieng; Xu Jin	1316

== Elimination round ==
1/12 finals
17	Brazil	154
16	Colombia	153
9	Italy	156
24	Australia	153
21	Malaysia	150
12	El Salvador	153
13	Indonesia	152
20	Germany	153
19	Poland	154
14	France	155
11	Estonia	155^{19}
22	Croatia	155^{20}
23	Puerto Rico	154
10	Netherlands	157
15	Kazakhstan	156
18	Vietnam	150

1/8 finals
1	South Korea	155
17	Brazil	153
9	Italy	155^{18}
8	Chinese Taipei	155^{18+}
5	Turkey	154
12	El Salvador	156
20	Germany	152
4	India	160
3	Mexico	159
14	France	157
22	Croatia	156
6	Great Britain	158
7	United States	156^{19}
10	Netherlands	156^{20}
15	Kazakhstan	157
2	Denmark	156

Quarterfinals
1	South Korea	155^{19}
8	Chinese Taipei	155^{20}
12	El Salvador	153
4	India	157
3	Mexico	158
6	Great Britain	153
10	Netherlands	155
15	Kazakhstan	153

Semifinals
8	Chinese Taipei	155
4	India	157
3	Mexico	158^{20}
10	Netherlands	158^{20+}

Final
4	India	155
10	Netherlands	157
Bronze medal
8	Chinese Taipei	157
3	Mexico	158

(+) Won the shoot-off by one arrow closer to the center of the target.
