= Sanne de Laat =

Dutch archer (born 1995)

Personal information
- Born: 13 February 1995 (age 31)

Sport
- Country: Netherlands
- Sport: Archery
- Event: Compound
Medal record
Women's compound archery
Representing Netherlands
World Championships
| Gold medal – first place | 2025 Gwangju | Mixed team |
European Championships
| Gold medal – first place | 2024 Essen | Mixed team |
| Gold medal – first place | 2026 Antalya | Team |
| Gold medal – first place | 2026 Antalya | Mixed team |
| Silver medal – second place | 2021 Antalya | Team |
| Bronze medal – third place | 2021 Antalya | Individual |
European Games
| Silver medal – second place | 2019 Minsk | Mixed team |
World Cup
| Gold medal – first place | 2025 Madrid | Mixed team |
| Silver medal – second place | 2017 Salt Lake City | Team |
| Bronze medal – third place | 2017 Berlin | Individual |
| Bronze medal – third place | 2018 Shanghai | Team |
| Bronze medal – third place | 2021 Paris | Team |
| Bronze medal – third place | 2023 Paris | Mixed team |

Sanne de Laat (born 13 February 1995) is a Dutch archer competing in women's compound events. She won the silver medal in the women's team event and the bronze medal in the women's individual event at the 2021 European Archery Championships held in Antalya, Turkey.

== Career ==
In 2017, De Laat and Mike Schloesser competed in the mixed team compound event at the World Games held in Wrocław, Poland. They were eliminated in the quarterfinals. She also competed in the women's individual compound event where she was eliminated in the elimination round by eventual gold medalist Sara López of Colombia.

In 2019, De Laat and Schloesser won the silver medal in the mixed team compound event at the European Games held in Minsk, Belarus. She also competed in the women's individual compound event where she was eliminated in the elimination round by eventual silver medalist Natalia Avdeeva of Russia.

She competed at the 2021 World Archery Championships held in Yankton, United States. She competed in the women's compound, women's team compound and compound mixed team events.

In 2022, De Laat won the women's compound event at the Dutch National Indoor Archery Championships. She represented the Netherlands at the 2022 World Games held in Birmingham, United States. De Laat competed in the women's individual compound event where she was eliminated in her second match in the elimination round by Sara López of Colombia. López went on to win the silver medal.

De Laat competed in the women's individual compound and mixed team compound events at the 2023 European Games held in Poland. She also competed in the women's individual compound, women's team compound and mixed team compound events at the 2023 World Archery Championships held in Berlin, Germany.

De Laat and Mike Schloesser won the gold medal in the mixed team compound event at the 2024 European Archery Championships held in Essen, Germany. She also competed in the women's individual compound event. De Laat and Schloesser also won the gold medal in the mixed team compound event at the 2025 World Archery Championships held in Gwangju, South Korea.
