= Cambarus reburrus =

Conservation status
- Least Concern (IUCN 3.1)

- Vulnerable (NatureServe)

Scientific classification
- Kingdom: Animalia
- Phylum: Arthropoda
- Clade: Pancrustacea
- Class: Malacostraca
- Order: Decapoda
- Suborder: Pleocyemata
- Family: Cambaridae
- Genus: Cambarus
- Species: C. reburrus

Binomial name
- Cambarus reburrus (Prins, 1968)

Species of crayfish

Cambarus reburrus, the French Broad crayfish, is a species of crayfish in the family Cambaridae. It is endemic to North Carolina. It can be found in the French Broad river basin, excluding the Nolichucky and Pigeon sub-basins, as well as parts of the Little Tennessee and Savannah river basins. The species can be found in five North Carolina counties: Henderson, Jackson, Madison, Buncombe, and Transylvania counties. Adult habitats have been described as slow or steadily flowing streams located in headwaters, often with minimal slope and high quantities of organic matter.

Some physical characteristics of the species include two stripes down the dorsal side of the abdomen and brown, red, and sometimes blue body color. This species has prominent cervical spines, cephalic and branchiostegal spines, a long and slender rostrum, a broad areola, and smaller, less developed chelae.

The IUCN conservation status of Cambarus reburrus is "LC", least concern, with no immediate threat to the species' survival. The IUCN status was reviewed in 2010. The species is listed as threatened within the state of North Carolina and is included on the North Carolina watch list. The species is considered critically imperiled (S1) within Tennessee and imperiled (S2) in North Carolina. There is not accurate population data for this species.
