= Archery at the 2019 Pan American Games – Women's individual compound =

Women's individual compound at the 2019 Pan American Games
- Venue: Villa Maria de Triunfo
- Dates: August 7–10
- Competitors: 10 from 10 nations

Medalists
Gold medal	Sara López; Colombia
Silver medal	Andrea Becerra; Mexico
Bronze medal	Paige Pearce; United States

The women's individual compound competition of the archery events at the 2019 Pan American Games was held from 7 August to 10 August at the Archery field at the Villa Maria de Triunfo in Lima, Peru.

== Schedule ==
Date	Time	Round
August 7, 2019	8:30	Ranking round
August 8, 2019	13:30	1/8 elimination
August 8, 2019	14:10	Quarterfinals
August 8, 2019	15:18	Semifinals
August 10, 2019	14:44	Finals

== Results ==
=== Ranking round ===
The results were as follows:

Rank	Archer	Nation	Score	Notes
1	Sara López	Colombia	708	PR
2	Ana Gabriela Mendoza	Venezuela	699	
3	Andrea Maya Becerra	Mexico	697	
4	Paige Pearce	United States	695	
5	Bryanne Lameg	Canada	689	
6	Marla Cintron	Puerto Rico	685	
7	María Eugenia González	Argentina	682	
8	Beatriz Aliaga	Peru	675	
9	Gisele Esposito Meleti	Brazil	673	
10	Maria Jose Zebadúa	Guatemala	672	

=== Elimination rounds ===
The results were as follows:

Round of 16
9	Gisele Esposito Meleti (BRA)	133
8	Beatriz Aliaga (PER)	141
7	María Eugenia González (ARG)	142
10	Maria Jose Zebadúa (GUA)	137

Quarterfinals
1	Sara López (COL)	145
8	Beatriz Aliaga (PER)	142
5	Bryanne Lameg (CAN)	144
4	Paige Pearce (USA)	147
3	Andrea Maya Becerra (MEX)	146
6	Marla Cintron (PUR)	141
7	María Eugenia González (ARG)	143
2	Ana Gabriela Mendoza (VEN)	140

Semifinals
1	Sara López (COL)	149
4	Paige Pearce (USA)	142
3	Andrea Maya Becerra (MEX)	143
7	María Eugenia González (ARG)	141

Final
1	Sara López (COL)	146
3	Andrea Maya Becerra (MEX)	142
Bronze medal match
4	Paige Pearce (USA)	149
7	María Eugenia González (ARG)	143
