= Andrea Becerra =

Mexican archer (born 2000)

Personal information
- Full name: Andrea Maya Becerra Arizaga
- Born: 25 July 2000 (age 26)

Sport
- Country: Mexico
- Sport: Archery
- Event: Compound
Medal record
Representing Mexico
Women's compound archery
Event	1st	2nd	3rd
World Championships	2	2	2
World Youth Championships	1	1	0
World Cup Final	1	0	0
World Cup	6	8	5
World Games	1	1	0
World University Games	1	0	0
Pan American Games	0	1	1
Pan American Championships	3	1	2
CAC Games	2	4	0
Total	17	18	10
World Championships
Gold medal – first place	2025 Gwangju	Individual
Gold medal – first place	2025 Gwangju	Team
Silver medal – second place	2023 Berlin	Individual
Silver medal – second place	2023 Berlin	Team
Bronze medal – third place	2021 Yankton	Individual
Bronze medal – third place	2025 Gwangju	Mixed team
World Cup Final
Gold medal – first place	2025 Nanjing	Individual
World Games
Gold medal – first place	2025 Chengdu	Individual
Silver medal – second place	2025 Chengdu	Mixed team
World University Games
Gold medal – first place	2019 Naples	Individual
Pan American Games
Silver medal – second place	2019 Lima	Individual
Bronze medal – third place	2023 Santiago	Team
Pan American Championships
Gold medal – first place	2018 Medellín	Team
Gold medal – first place	2022 Santiago	Team
Gold medal – first place	2026 Tlaxcala	Team
Silver medal – second place	2021 Monterrey	Team
Bronze medal – third place	2024 Medellín	Team
Bronze medal – third place	2026 Tlaxcala	Mixed team
Central American and Caribbean Games
Gold medal – first place	2018 Barranquilla	Team
Gold medal – first place	2023 San Salvador	Team
Silver medal – second place	2018 Barranquilla	Individual
Silver medal – second place	2023 San Salvador	Individual
Silver medal – second place	2026 Santo Domingo	Individual
Silver medal – second place	2026 Santo Domingo	Team
World Youth Championships
Gold medal – first place	2017 Rosario	Team
Silver medal – second place	2017 Rosario	Mixed team

Andrea Maya Becerra Arizaga (Note: In this Spanish name, the first or paternal surname is Becerra and the second or maternal family name is Arizaga.) (born 25 July 2000) is a Mexican archer competing incompound events. She won the silver medal in the women's individual and women's team events at the 2023 World Championships. She is also a silver medalist in the women's individual event at the 2019 Pan American Games in Lima, Peru and the 2023 Central American and Caribbean Games held in El Salvador.

== Career ==
Becerra won the silver medal in the women's individual event at the 2019 Pan American Games held in Lima, Peru. A month earlier, Becerra also won the gold medal in the women's individual compound event at the 2019 Summer Universiade held in Naples, Italy.

In 2021, Becerra won the bronze medal in the women's individual compound event at the World Archery Championships held in Yankton, United States. She also competed in the women's team compound and compound mixed team events.

Becerra represented Mexico at the 2022 World Games held in Birmingham, United States. She competed in the women's individual compound and mixed team compound events.

She won two medals at the 2023 Central American and Caribbean Games held in El Salvador. In August 2023, she won the silver medal in the women's individual compound event at the World Archery Championships held in Berlin, Germany. Becerra, Ana Hernández and Dafne Quintero won the silver in the women's team compound event.

In November 2023, Becerra and Dafne Quintero won the bronze medal in the women's team compound event at the Pan American Games held in Santiago, Chile. She also competed in the women's individual compound event.

In 2025, she won the gold medal in the women's individual compound event at the World Games held in Chengdu, China. She also won the silver medal in the mixed team compound event together with Sebastián García Flores.
