= Areola (disambiguation) =

An areola is a small colored area of skin, usually around the nipple

Areola or areole (Latin for "small space") may also refer to:

- The open spaces of areolar connective tissue, a type of loose connective tissue
- Areolae (diatom), pores in the silica shell of diatoms
- Areole, a raised structure bearing spines on cacti
- Areola (lichen), a round to polygonal part of a surface of a crustose lichen
- Areola (entomology), a small ring of color or gap in wing margin of insects- see the Glossary of entomology terms.
- Areola, the open space created by higher venation of a leaf - see the Glossary of botanical terms

== Music ==
- "Areola", a song by 816 Boyz from Tech N9ne's album Sickology 101

== People ==
- Alphonse Areola, French footballer

== See also ==
- Arreola, a surname
- Aureola, a symbolic aura in religious artwork
- Arbeloa, a Spanish footballer
