= 2015 European Indoor Archery Championships =

2015 European Indoor Championships
- Location: Koper, Slovenia
- Dates: 24–28 February 2015
- Competitors: 253 from 34 nations

The 2015 European Indoor Archery Championships was the 15th edition of the European Indoor Archery Championships. The event was held in Koper, Slovenia from 24 to 28 February 2015.

== Medal table ==
* Host nation (Slovenia)

Rank	Nation	Gold	Silver	Bronze	Total
1	Germany	2	0	2	4
1	Netherlands	2	0	2	4
3	Italy	1	3	2	6
4	Russia	1	1	1	3
5	Belgium	1	0	0	1
5	Ukraine	1	0	0	1
7	Georgia	0	2	0	2
8	Denmark	0	1	1	2
9	France	0	1	0	1
Totals (9 entries)		8	8	8	24

== Medal summary ==
=== Recurve ===
Event	Gold	Silver	Bronze
Men's individual	Heorhiy Ivanytskyy; Ukraine	Massimiliano Mandia; Italy	Felix Wieser; Germany
Women's individual	Veronika Haidn-Tschalova; Germany	Khatuna Narimanidze; Georgia	Lisa Unruh; Germany
Men's team	Netherlands; Rick van der Ven; Jan van Tongeren; Sjef van den Berg	Italy; Massimiliano Mandia; Matteo Fissore; Marco Morello	Russia; Aleksandr Kozhin; Bair Tsybekdorzhiyev; Aleksey Nikolayev
Women's team	Germany; Veronika Haidn-Tschalova; Kristina Berger-Heigenhauser; Lisa Unruh	Georgia; Khatuna Narimanidze; Yuliya Lobzhenidze; Kristine Esebua	Italy; Manuela Mercuri; Chiara Rebagliati; Giulia Mammi

=== Compound ===
Event	Gold	Silver	Bronze
Men's individual	Sergio Pagni; Italy	Stephan Hansen; Denmark	Mike Schloesser; Netherlands
Women's individual	Sarah Prieels; Belgium	Nataliya Avdeyeva; Russia	Anastasia Anastasio; Italy
Men's team	Netherlands; Mike Schloesser; Peter Elzinga; Ruben Bleyendaal	France; Sébastien Peineau; Sébastien Brasseur; Pierre-Julien Deloche	Denmark; Stephan Hansen; Andreas Darum; Martin Damsbo
Women's team	Russia; Nataliya Avdeyeva; Mariya Vinogradova; Albina Loginova	Italy; Anastasia Anastasio; Marcella Tonioli; Viviana Spano	Netherlands; Inge van Caspel; Martine Stas-Couwenberg; Ingeborg Enthoven-Mokkenstorm

== Participating nations ==
253 archers from 34 countries:

1. Armenia (4)
2. Austria (9)
3. Azerbaijan (1)
4. Belgium (8)
5. Bosnia and Herzegovina (3)
6. Belarus (13)
7. Bulgaria (10)
8. Croatia (8)
9. Czech Republic (1)
10. Denmark (8)
11. Spain (1)
12. Estonia (3)
13. Finland (2)
14. France (8)
15. United Kingdom (6)
16. Georgia (6)
17. Germany (10)
18. Greece (5)
19. Hungary (2)
20. Italy (21)
21. Latvia (1)
22. Lithuania (5)
23. Moldova (4)
24. Netherlands (10)
25. Norway (6)
26. Poland (14)
27. Romania (1)
28. Russia (20)
29. Slovenia (16) (Host)
30. Serbia (5)
31. Switzerland (5)
32. Slovakia (5)
33. Sweden (8)
34. Ukraine (24)
