= Archery at the 2019 European Games – Mixed team compound =

Mixed team recurve at the 2019 European Games
- Venue: Olympic Sports Complex
- Date: 21, 23 June
- Competitors: 18 from 9 nations

Medalists
gold medal	Natalia Avdeeva; Anton Bulaev	Russia
silver medal	Sanne de Laat; Mike Schloesser	Netherlands
bronze medal	Yeşim Bostan; Evren Çağıran	Turkey

The mixed team compound competition at the 2019 European Games was held on 21 and 23 June 2019 at the Olympic Sports Complex in Minsk, Belarus.

18 archers promoted from the individual ranking round.

== Ranking round ==
Rank	Nation	Archer	Score	10s	Xs
1	Russia	Anton Bulaev	1400	104	39
1	Russia	Natalia Avdeeva	1400	104	39
2	Netherlands	Mike Schloesser	1398	104	54
2	Netherlands	Sanne de Laat	1398	104	54
3	Croatia	Mario Vavro	1397	103	51
3	Croatia	Amanda Mlinarić	1397	103	51
4	France	Pierre-Julien Deloche	1395	103	46
4	France	Sophie Dodemont	1395	103	46
5	Turkey	Evren Çağıran	1394	100	48
5	Turkey	Yeşim Bostan	1394	100	48
6	Italy	Sergio Pagni	1382	94	36
6	Italy	Marcella Tonioli	1382	94	36
7	Great Britain	Adam Ravenscroft	1377	90	45
7	Great Britain	Lucy Torrin Mason	1377	90	45
8	Belarus	Maksim Ban	1370	81	25
8	Belarus	Alena Kuzniatsova	1370	81	25
9	Germany	Marcel Trachsel	1361	73	22
9	Germany	Janine Meißner	1361	73	22

== Elimination round ==
Round of 16
1
16
9	Germany	155
8	Belarus	146
5
12
13
4
3
14
11
6
7
10
15
2

Quarterfinals
1	Russia	154
9	Germany	143
5	Turkey	151
4	France	148
3	Croatia	150
6	Italy	135
7	Great Britain	147
2	Netherlands	155

Semifinals
1	Russia	152
5	Turkey	145
3	Croatia	142
2	Netherlands	150

Final
1	Russia	152 (18)
2	Netherlands	152 (17)
Third place match
5	Turkey	153
3	Croatia	152
