= Archery at the 2025 World Games – Mixed team compound =

Mixed team compound at the 2025 World Games
- Venue: Qinglong Lake, Chengdu, China
- Dates: 7–8 August
- Competitors: 26 from 20 nations

Medalists
gold medal	Mathias Fullerton; Sofie Marcussen	Denmark
silver medal	Andrea Becerra; Sebastián García Flores	Mexico
bronze medal	Alexis Ruiz; Curtis Broadnax	United States

The mixed team compound archery competition at the 2025 World Games took place on 7 and 8 August 2025 at the Qinglong Lake in Chengdu, China.

== Results ==
=== Qualification round ===
Rank	Archer	Nation	Score	10s	Xs
1	Madhura Dhamangaonkar; Abhishek Verma	India	1415	51	120
2	Alexis Ruiz; Curtis Broadnax	United States	1414	49	120
3	Andrea Becerra; Sebastián García Flores	Mexico	1408	54	113
4	Mathias Fullerton; Sofie Marcussen	Denmark	1406	54	114
5	Marco Bruno; Elisa Roner	Italy	1403	50	110
6	Begüm Yuva; Batuhan Akçaoğlu	Turkey	1403	39	110
7	Alejandra Usquiano; Daniel Muñoz	Colombia	1402	49	108
8	Moon Ye-eun; Lee Eun-ho	South Korea	1392	41	96
9	Wu Guangjie; Ai Xinliang	China	1386	49	94
10	Hendre Verhoef; Jeanine van Kradenburg	South Africa	1384	40	98
11	Brandon Hawes; Rhiannon Mills	Australia	1376	38	93

=== Elimination round ===
Quarter-finals
1 India	151
8 South Korea	154
5 Italy	157
4 Denmark	158
3 Mexico	156
6 Turkey	155
7 Colombia	154
2 United States	154

Semi-finals
8 South Korea	152
4 Denmark	157
3 Mexico	158
2 United States	157

Gold medal match
4 Denmark	156
3 Mexico	155
Bronze medal match
8 South Korea	155
2 United States	157
