= Alexis Ruiz =

American archer (born 1999)

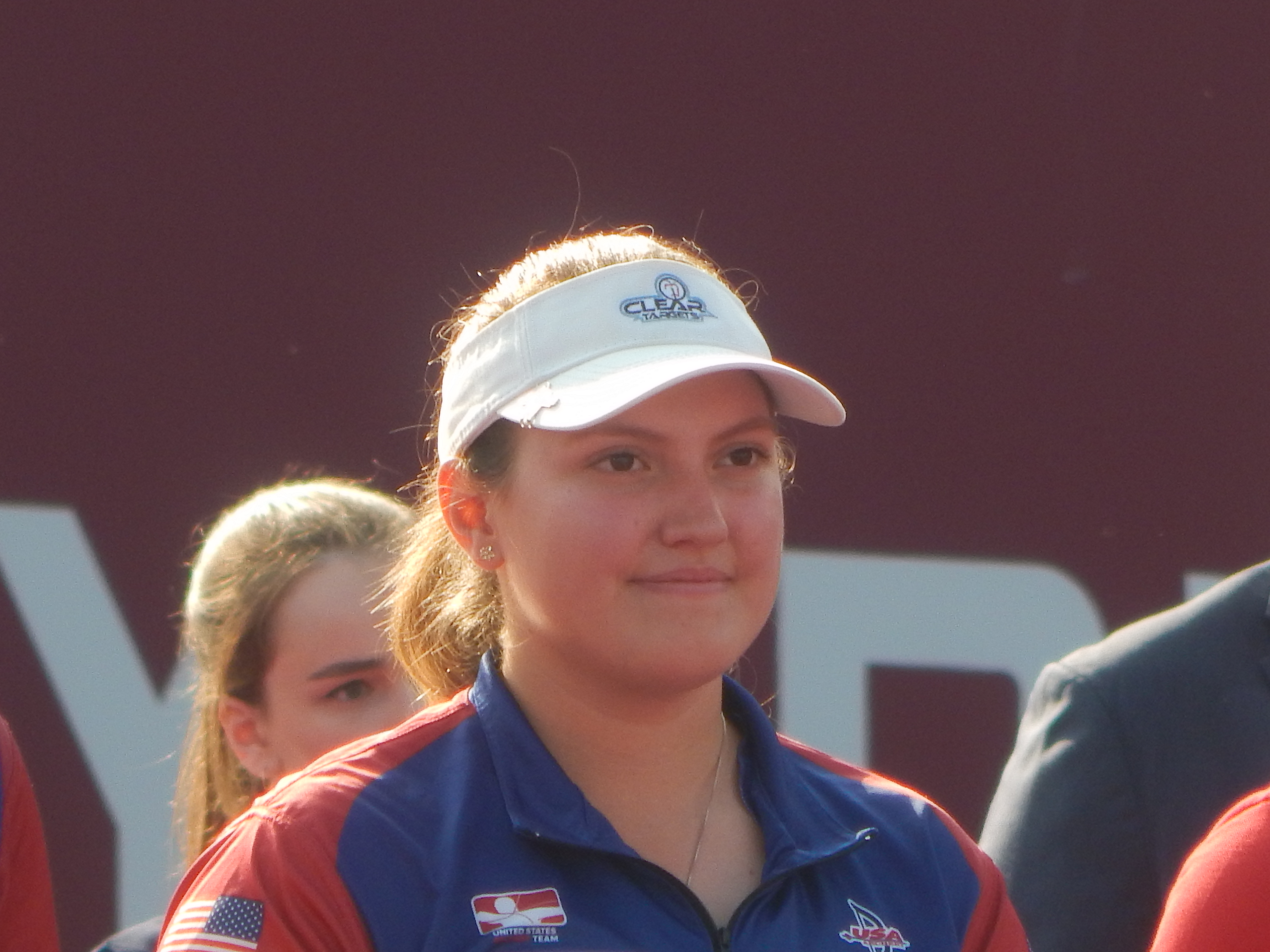
- Alexis Ruiz in 2019

Personal information
- Born: July 30, 1999 (age 27)

Sport
- Sport: Archery
- Event: Compound
Medal record
Women's compound archery
Representing United States
World Championships
Gold medal – first place	2023 Berlin	Mixed team
Silver medal – second place	2019 Hertogenbosch	Team
Silver medal – second place	2025 Gwangju	Team
World Cup Final
Gold medal – first place	2026 Saltillo	Individual
World Games
Bronze medal – third place	2025 Chengdu	Mixed team
Pan American Games
Gold medal – first place	2023 Santiago	Team
Silver medal – second place	2023 Santiago	Individual
Silver medal – second place	2023 Santiago	Mixed team
Pan American Championships
Gold medal – first place	2024 Medellín	Individual
Gold medal – first place	2024 Medellín	Team
Gold medal – first place	2024 Medellín	Mixed team
Gold medal – first place	2026 Tlaxcala	Individual
Gold medal – first place	2026 Tlaxcala	Mixed team
Bronze medal – third place	2022 Santiago	Team
Bronze medal – third place	2026 Tlaxcala	Team

Alexis Ruiz (born July 30, 1999) is an American archer who competes in compound events. She has won silver medals in the women's team compound event at the 2019 and 2025 World Championships. She won three medals, including gold, at the 2023 Pan American Games held in Santiago, Chile. She also won three gold medals at the 2024 Pan American Archery Championships held in Medellín, Colombia.

== Career ==
In the 2019 Archery World Cup she won a medal in each of the four stages of the women's individual compound event. As a result, she climbed to the number one spot in the women's compound world rankings.

In 2020, she finished in 20th place in the women's compound event at The Vegas Shoot held in Las Vegas, United States.

Ruiz and Sawyer Sullivan won the gold medal in the compound mixed team event at the 2023 World Archery Championships held in Berlin, Germany. She also competed in the women's individual compound and women's team compound events.

== Personal life ==
When not competing, Ruiz works as a pediatric nurse.
