= Shamai Yamrom =

Israeli archer (born 2005)

Personal information
- Native name: שמאי ירום
- Born: 7 April 2005 (age 21)

Sport
- Country: Israel
- Sport: Archery
- Event: Compound
Medal record
Men's compound archery
Representing Israel
European Championships
Silver medal – second place	2024 Essen	Individual
European Indoor Championships
Gold medal – first place	2024 Varaždin	Individual

Shamai Yamrom (Hebrew: שמאי ירום; born 7 April 2005) is an Israeli archer competing in compound events. He won the gold medal in the men's individual compound event at the 2024 European Indoor Archery Championships held in Varaždin, Croatia. He won the silver medal in his event at the 2024 European Archery Championships held in Essen, Germany.

Yamrom competed in the men's individual compound event at the 2021 World Archery Championships held in Yankton, United States. He was eliminated in his fourth match in the elimination round by Mathias Fullerton of Denmark. In 2022, Yamrom competed in the men's individual compound event at the European Archery Championships held in Munich, Germany.

Yamrom represented Israel at the 2023 European Games held in Poland. He competed in the men's individual compound event. Yamrom and Romi Maymon won the silver medal in the mixed team compound event at the 2023 World Archery Youth Championships held in Limerick, Ireland. He also competed in the men's individual compound and men's team compound events at the 2023 World Archery Championships held in Berlin, Germany.
