= Arreola =

Arreola is a surname. Notable people with the surname include:

- Chris Arreola, American Heavyweight boxer
- Daniel Arreola, Mexican football (soccer) player
- Éder Arreola, American football (soccer) player
- Jairo Arreola, Guatemalan football (soccer) player
- Juan José Arreola, Mexican writer, academic, and actor
- Liko Arreola (born c. 2008), American archer
