= Mariya Shkolna =

Ukrainian and Luxembourgish archer

Personal information
- Born: 28 October 1997 (age 28) Lviv, Ukraine

Sport
- Country: Luxembourg (since 2018); Poland (2017); Ukraine (till 2017)
- Sport: Archery
- Event: Compound
- Coached by: Kostiantyn Shkolnyi
Medal record
Women's archery
Representing Luxembourg
World Championships
Bronze medal – third place	2023 Berlin	Mixed team
Representing Ukraine
World Championships
Gold medal – first place	2015 Copenhagen	Team

Mariya Shkolna (born 28 October 1997 in Kyiv, Ukraine) is a Luxembourgian athlete of Ukrainian origin who competes in compound archery. She started archery in 2009 and first competed for the Ukrainian national team in 2010. She is righthanded. Her draw weight is 59 lbs. She is the member of the Ukrainian women's team that won the first ever medal in compound archery and the first ever gold medal overall for Ukraine at the World Archery Championships in 2015.

In 2017, she switched to represent Poland. She competed at the 2017 World Games and 2017 Summer Universiade for team Poland.

After a short period of time, she became member of the Luxembourgish national team. Together with Gilles Seywert, she won bronze medal at the 2023 World Championships in the mixed team event.
