= Adriana Espinosa =

Ecuadorian archer (born 1991)

Personal information
- Full name: Adriana Espinosa de los Monteros
- Born: 18 July 1991 (age 33); Guayaquil, Ecuador

Sport
- Sport: Archery

Adriana Espinosa de los Monteros (born 18 July 1991), also known as Adriana Espinoza de los Monteros, is an Ecuadorian archer. She competed in the women's individual event at the 2020 Summer Olympics.
