= Liko Arreola =

American archer

Personal information
- Born: Makawao, Maui, Hawaii, U.S.
- Occupation: Archer
- Years active: 2019–present
Medal record
Representing the United States
Women's compound archery
Pan American Championships
Bronze medal – third place	2026 Tlaxcala	Team

Liko Arreola is an American archer based in Makawao, Maui, Hawaii. Notable for her participation in various national and international archery competitions, Arreola has set multiple records in her category. Her involvement in the sport began at an early age, and she has since gone on to represent the United States at the World Archery Youth Championships. In 2023, she made her debut in World Cup at Stage 3 and won double gold medals.

== Early life and interest in archery ==
Born and raised in Maui, Hawaii, Arreola was introduced to archery at the age of 6 by her father, Ryan Arreola, a recreational archer. She entered her first archery tournament at the age of 7. Her interest in the sport was inspired by the 2012 film, "Brave," which features a protagonist who is also a skilled archer.

== Career ==
In 2019, she broke two national records at the Junior Olympic Archery Development (JOAD) Target Nationals and six national records at the National Field Archery Association National Roundup.

In June 2021, while still in her early teens, she competed in her first United States Archery Team (USAT) tournament at the SoCal Showdown in Chula Vista, California. Competing in the cadet division, Arreola placed first in the qualification round and won gold in the elimination round.

In July 2022, Arreola broke a world record in a national archery tournament, shooting a score of 702 out of 720 in the 50-meter round, surpassing the previous record for her division.

Throughout 2023, Arreola represented the United States in various competitions. She won her division at the World Archery Youth Championships U.S. Team Trials and was selected to represent the United States at the world championships in Limerick, Ireland. She also competed in the Arizona Cup and the World and Pan Am Team Trials, where she placed 12th and 9th, respectively. Arreola has also competed in various national and international events, including the Lancaster Archery Classic in Pennsylvania, the Vegas Shoot in Nevada, and the Easton Scholarship Tour in Utah.

Arreola made her World Cup debut at Stage 3 in Colombia on June 17, 2023, where she won double gold medals. First, as a member of the compound women's team, she helped defeat Colombia, and then she won the individual gold medal against Sara Lopez, becoming the youngest individual medalist at a World Cup. She is now qualified for both the World Archery Championships in Berlin and the World Cup Final in Mexico.
