= Mike Schloesser =

Dutch compound archer (born 1994)

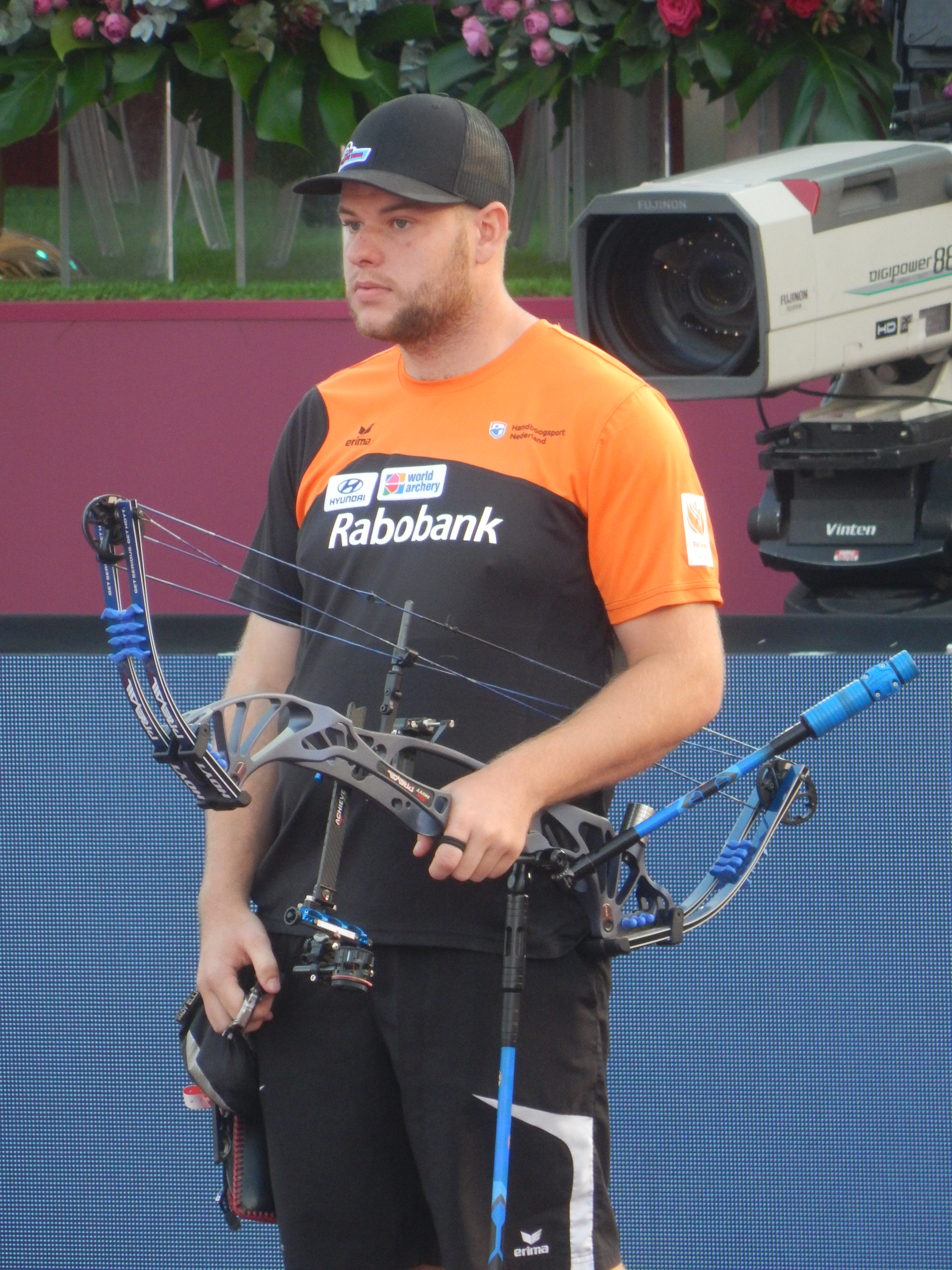
- Schloesser at the 2019 World Cup Final

Personal information
- Nickname: Mr. Perfect
- Born: January 15, 1994 (age 32) Heerlen, Netherlands
- Spouse: Gabriela Bayardo
Medal record
Men's compound archery
Representing Netherlands
World Championships
| Gold medal – first place | 2013 Belek | Individual |
| Gold medal – first place | 2025 Gwangju | Mixed team |
| Silver medal – second place | 2021 Yankton | Individual |
| Bronze medal – third place | 2019 Hertogenbosch | Team |
| Bronze medal – third place | 2023 Berlin | Individual |
| Bronze medal – third place | 2023 Berlin | Team |
World Indoor Championships
| Gold medal – first place | 2018 Yankton | Individual |
| Silver medal – second place | 2016 Ankara | Individual |
| Bronze medal – third place | 2018 Yankton | Team |
World Field Championships
| Gold medal – first place | 2018 Cortina | Individual |
| Gold medal – first place | 2024 Lac La Biche | Individual |
World Cup Final
| Gold medal – first place | 2016 Odense | Individual |
| Gold medal – first place | 2019 Moscow | Individual |
| Gold medal – first place | 2021 Yankton | Individual |
| Gold medal – first place | 2022 Tlaxcala | Individual |
| Bronze medal – third place | 2023 Hermosillo | Individual |
| Bronze medal – third place | 2024 Tlaxcala | Individual |
World Games
| Gold medal – first place | 2025 Chengdu | Individual |
| Silver medal – second place | 2022 Birmingham | Mixed team |
European Games
| Gold medal – first place | 2019 Minsk | Individual |
| Silver medal – second place | 2019 Minsk | Mixed team |
European Championships
| Gold medal – first place | 2014 Echmiadzin | Team |
| Gold medal – first place | 2022 Munich | Individual |
| Gold medal – first place | 2024 Essen | Mixed team |
| Gold medal – first place | 2026 Antalya | Mixed team |
| Silver medal – second place | 2018 Legnica | Mixed team |
| Silver medal – second place | 2022 Munich | Team |
| Bronze medal – third place | 2012 Amsterdam | Team |
| Bronze medal – third place | 2014 Echmiadzin | Mixed team |
| Bronze medal – third place | 2024 Essen | Individual |
| Bronze medal – third place | 2026 Antalya | Individual |
European Indoor Championships
| Gold medal – first place | 2022 Laško | Individual |
| Gold medal – first place | 2019 Samsun | Individual |
| Gold medal – first place | 2013 Rzeszów | Team |
| Gold medal – first place | 2015 Koper | Team |
| Gold medal – first place | 2022 Laško | Team |
| Silver medal – second place | 2017 Vittel | Individual |
| Silver medal – second place | 2017 Vittel | Team |
| Bronze medal – third place | 2015 Koper | Individual |
| Bronze medal – third place | 2019 Samsun | Team |
World Youth Championships
| Gold medal – first place | 2011 Legnica | Mixed team |
| Silver medal – second place | 2011 Legnica | Team |

Mike Schloesser (born 15 January 1994) is a compound archer from Netherlands. In 2015, he was the first person to hit a perfect 600/600, hence his nickname Mr. Perfect. In December 2023 he surpassed Sara López as the longest-tenured world number one. Both had been in the top three since the beginning of the 2015 season. Schloesser had been holding the number one position in the world ranking since 24 May 2021. In March 2024 he broke the record for the longest consecutive days ranked number one.

== Career ==
Schloesser has won three medals at the World Youth Championships, competed in the World Cup and in the 2013 World Championships he qualified 5th in the same event. He also competed in the men's team compound and mixed team compound event for Netherlands.

He won the gold medal in the men's individual compound event at the 2019 European Games held in Minsk, Belarus. Schloesser and Sanne de Laat also won the silver medal in the mixed team compound event.

In 2020, Schloesser won the silver medal in the men's individual compound event at the World Archery Championships held in Yankton, United States.

In February 2022, Schloesser won the gold medal in both the men's compound and men's team compound events at the 2022 European Indoor Championships held in Laško, Slovenia. In March 2022, he won also the men's compound event at the Dutch National Indoor Archery Championships. In April 2022, he won the gold medal in the men's compound event at the Antalya, Turkey event in the 2022 World Cup.

Schloesser won the gold medal in the men's individual compound event at the 2022 European Championships held in Munich, Germany. He also won the silver medal in the men's team compound event.

Schloesser and Sanne de Laat won the gold medal in the mixed team compound event at the 2024 European Championships held in Essen, Germany. He also won the bronze medal in the men's individual compound event.

In 2025, he won the gold medal in the men's individual compound event at the World Games held in Chengdu, China.
