= Satsuki Noda =

Japanese archer (born 2000)

Personal information
- Born: 20 May 2000 (age 26) Kitakyushu, Japan

Sport
- Sport: Archery
- Event: Recurve
Medal record
Women's recurve archery
Representing Japan
World Championships
Bronze medal – third place	2023 Berlin	Individual
Asian Games
Silver medal – second place	2022 Hangzhou	Mixed team

Satsuki Noda (野田 紗月, Noda Satsuki; born 20 May 2000), also known as Satsuki Tokugawa (德川 紗月, Tokugawa Satsuki), is a Japanese archer competing in women's recurve events. She was a bronze medalist at the 2023 World Archery Championships, and a silver medal at the 2022 Asian Games.

== Career ==
She won bronze at the 2023 World Archery Championships in the Women's individual recurve in Berlin in August 2023.

She was a silver medalist at the delayed 2022 Asian Games in the Mixed team recurve event alongside Takaharu Furukawa in Hangzhou, losing the final to South Korean pair Lim Si-hyeon and Lee Woo-seok.

Alongside Furukawa she won the mixed team at the Antalya leg of the 2024 Archery World Cup. She was selected to compete at the 2024 Paris Olympics in Paris.
