= 2023 World Archery Championships – Recurve mixed team =

Archery competition

The mixed team recurve competition at the 2023 World Archery Championships took place from 1 to 4 August in Berlin, Germany.

== Schedule ==
All times are Central European Summer Time (UTC+02:00).

| Date | Time | Round |
|---|---|---|
| Tuesday, 1 August | 09:30 | Qualification round |
| Wednesday, 2 August | 13:15; 13:40; 14:05; 14:30 | 1/12 finals 1/8 finals Quarterfinals; Semifinals |
| Friday, 4 August | 18:04; 18:23 | Bronze medal match Final |

== Qualification round ==
Results after 144 arrows.

| Rank | Nation | Name | Score |
|---|---|---|---|
| 1 | South Korea | Lim Si-hyeon; Kim Woo-jin | 1363 |
| 2 | Mexico | Alejandra Valencia; Carlos Rojas | 1331 |
| 3 | China | An Qixuan; Qi Xiangshuo | 1326 |
| 4 | India | Ankita Bhakat; Dhiraj Bommadevara | 1322 |
| 5 | United States | Casey Kaufhold; Brady Ellison | 1321 |
| 6 | Germany | Michelle Kroppen; Florian Unruh | 1321 |
| 7 | Chinese Taipei | Lei Chien-ying; Tang Chih-chun | 1318 |
| 8 | France | Lisa Barbelin; Baptiste Addis | 1318 |
| 9 | Spain | Elia Canales; Pablo Acha | 1318 |
| 10 | Great Britain | Penny Healey; James Woodgate | 1316 |
| 11 | Netherlands | Laura van der Winkel; Steve Wijler | 1316 |
| 12 | Indonesia | Diananda Choirunisa; Alviyanto Prastyadi | 1316 |
| 13 | Italy | Tatiana Andreoli; Mauro Nespoli | 1315 |
| 14 | Japan | Satsuki Noda; Takaharu Furukawa | 1309 |
| 15 | Vietnam | Đỗ Thị Ánh Nguyệt; Nguyễn Duy | 1301 |
| 16 | Ukraine | Anastasia Pavlova; Ivan Kozhokar | 1301 |
| 17 | Brazil | Marina Canetta; Marcus D'Almeida | 1299 |
| 18 | Turkey | Fatma Maraşlı; Mete Gazoz | 1297 |
| 19 | Czech Republic | Marie Horáčková; Josef Křesala | 1297 |
| 20 | Colombia | Ana Rendón; Jorge Enríquez | 1293 |
| 21 | Denmark | Kirstine Danstrup Andersen; Christian Christensen | 1290 |
| 22 | Poland | Magdalena Śmiałkowska; Kacper Sierakowski | 1283 |
| 23 | Canada | Virginie Chénier; Crispin Duenas | 1282 |
| 24 | Kazakhstan | Alua Mukhtarkhanova; Ilfat Abdullin | 1279 |
| 25 | Switzerland | Liliana Licari; Keziah Chabin | 1278 |
| 26 | Portugal | Milana Tkachenko; Nuno Carneiro | 1276 |
| 27 | Bangladesh | Diya Siddique; Ram Krishna Saha | 1276 |
| 28 | Austria | Elisabeth Straka; Andreas Gstöttner | 1271 |
| 29 | Sweden | Christine Bjerendal; Kaj Sjöberg | 1270 |
| 30 | Slovenia | Žana Pintarič; Žiga Ravnikar | 1270 |
| 31 | Australia | Laura Paeglis; Ryan Tyack | 1264 |
| 32 | Slovakia | Denisa Baránková; Miroslav Duchoň | 1262 |
| 33 | Chile | Javiera Andrades; Ricardo Soto | 1261 |
| 34 | Malaysia | Nurul Izzah Mazlan; Khairul Anuar Mohamad | 1261 |
| 35 | Mongolia | Bishindeegiin Urantungalag; Dorjsürengiin Dashnamjil | 1261 |
| 36 | Georgia | Salome Kharshiladze; Temur Makievi | 1260 |
| 37 | Serbia | Anja Brkić; Mihajlo Stefanović | 1252 |
| 38 | Estonia | Reena Pärnat; Märt Oona | 1250 |
| 39 | Bulgaria | Dobromira Danailova; Ivan Banchev | 1249 |
| 40 | Romania | Mădălina Amăistroaie; Mario Țîmpu | 1248 |
| 41 | Israel | Mikaella Moshe; Roy Dror | 1247 |
| 42 | Cyprus | Elena Petrou; Charalambos Charalambous | 1246 |
| 43 | Thailand | Punika Jongkraijak; Tanapat Pathairat | 1238 |
| 44 | United States Virgin Islands | Tetiana Muntian; Nicholas D'Amour | 1236 |
| 45 | Ecuador | Adriana Espinosa; Lester Ortegón | 1232 |
| 46 | Finland | Iida Tukiainen; Antti Vikström | 1227 |
| 47 | Lithuania | Paulina Ramanauskaitė; Modestas Šliauteris | 1223 |
| 48 | Singapore | Kaining Ng; Li Yue Long | 1221 |
| 49 | Azerbaijan | Fatima Huseynli; Mahammadali Aliyev | 1215 |
| 50 | Hong Kong | Cheng Yik Kiu; Caleb Tong | 1202 |
| 51 | Egypt | Rana Kamel; Bahaaeldin Aly | 1201 |
| 52 | Bolivia | Mayte Paredes; Alexander Mendoza | 1161 |
| 53 | United Arab Emirates | Hussa Ahmed; Abdulla Al-Ketbi | 1144 |
| 54 | Ivory Coast | Ekpobi Yedagne; Franck Eyeni | 1141 |
| 55 | San Marino | Kristina Pruccoli; Leonardo Tura | 1136 |
| 56 | Latvia | Lija Seibute; Dāvis Blāze | 1132 |
| 57 | Iceland | Marín Hilmarsdóttir; Dagur Örn Fannarsson | 1118 |

== Elimination round ==
=== Section 1 ===
1/12 finals
1 | South Korea
Bye
17 | Brazil | 3 | 35 | 38 | 38 | 33
16 | Ukraine | 5 | 35 | 39 | 35 | 38
9 | Spain | 0 | 35 | 34 | 37
24 | Kazakhstan | 6 | 39 | 38 | 38
Bye
8 | France
5 | United States
Bye
21 | Denmark | 1 | 33 | 36 | 33
12 | Indonesia | 5 | 35 | 36 | 36
13 | Italy | 5 | 38 | 35 | 38
20 | Colombia | 1 | 37 | 35 | 34
Bye
4 | India

1/8 finals
1 | South Korea | 5 | 40 | 37 | 34 | 39 | 20
16 | Ukraine | 4 | 37 | 39 | 37 | 34 | 18
24 | Kazakhstan | 5 | 37 | 36 | 36 | 38
8 | France | 3 | 35 | 36 | 37 | 35
5 | United States | 5 | 37 | 36 | 37
12 | Indonesia | 1 | 37 | 35 | 38
13 | Italy | 5 | 37 | 35 | 37 | 36 | 17
4 | India | 4 | 35 | 36 | 39 | 34 | 16

Quarterfinals
1 | South Korea | 6 | 39 | 38 | 40
24 | Kazakhstan | 0 | 34 | 32 | 39
5 | United States | 2 | 38 | 35 | 37 | 36
13 | Italy | 6 | 34 | 38 | 38 | 39

Semifinals
1 | South Korea | 6 | 37 | 38 | 38
13 | Italy | 0 | 36 | 35 | 33

=== Section 2 ===
1/12 finals
3 | China
Bye
19 | Czech Republic | 2 | 38 | 34 | 33 | 31
14 | Japan | 6 | 36 | 35 | 34 | 35
11 | Netherlands | 6 | 40 | 37 | 31 | 39
22 | Poland | 2 | 35 | 35 | 32 | 33
Bye
6 | Germany
7 | Chinese Taipei
Bye
23 | Canada | 0 | 37 | 33 | 34
10 | Great Britain | 6 | 38 | 34 | 36
15 | Vietnam | 4 | 37 | 32 | 34 | 35 | 16
18 | Turkey | 5 | 39 | 35 | 29 | 33 | 16+
Bye
2 | Mexico

1/8 finals
3 | China | 1 | 37 | 35 | 35
14 | Japan | 5 | 37 | 36 | 36
11 | Netherlands | 2 | 38 | 34 | 34 | 36
6 | Germany | 6 | 34 | 39 | 39 | 38
7 | Chinese Taipei | 5 | 37 | 37 | 37
10 | Great Britain | 1 | 36 | 36 | 37
18 | Turkey | 2 | 36 | 35 | 37 | 35
2 | Mexico | 6 | 37 | 38 | 36 | 37

Quarterfinals
14 | Japan | 2 | 34 | 35 | 36 | 37
6 | Germany | 6 | 37 | 34 | 39 | 40
7 | Chinese Taipei | 5 | 39 | 38 | 39
2 | Mexico | 1 | 36 | 38 | 35

Semifinals
6 | Germany | 5 | 38 | 36 | 33 | 38 | 18+
7 | Chinese Taipei | 4 | 35 | 38 | 37 | 37 | 18

== Final round ==
Semifinals
1 | South Korea | 6 | 37 | 38 | 38
13 | Italy | 0 | 36 | 35 | 33
6 | Germany | 5 | 38 | 36 | 33 | 38 | 18+
7 | Chinese Taipei | 4 | 35 | 38 | 37 | 37 | 18

Finals
1 | South Korea | 5 | 38 | 38 | 36
6 | Germany | 1 | 36 | 37 | 36
Third place
13 | Italy | 5 | 32 | 39 | 38 | 39
7 | Chinese Taipei | 3 | 36 | 39 | 37 | 38
