= 2023 World Archery Championships – Men's team recurve =

Archery competition

The men's team recurve competition at the 2023 World Archery Championships took place from 1 to 4 August in Berlin, Germany.

== Schedule ==
All times are Central European Summer Time (UTC+02:00).

Date	Time	Round
Tuesday, 1 August	09:30	Qualification round
Wednesday, 2 August	10:15; 10:45; 11:15	1/12 finals 1/8 finals Quarterfinals
Friday, 4 August	16:03; 17:00; 17:26	Semifinals; Bronze medal match Final

== Qualification round ==
Results after 216 arrows.

Rank	Nation	Name	Score
1	South Korea	Kim Woo-jin; Kim Je-deok; Lee Woo-seok	2048
2	Netherlands	Gijs Broeksma; Senna Roos; Steve Wijler	1992
3	China	Li Zhongyuan; Qi Xiangshuo; Wang Dapeng	1989
4	Germany	Florian Unruh; Maximilian Weckmüller; Moritz Wieser	1984
5	United States	Brady Ellison; Jackson Mirich; Jack Williams	1983
6	Chinese Taipei	Su Yu-yang; Tai Yu-hsuan; Tang Chih-chun	1982
7	Turkey	Mete Gazoz; Ulaş Berkim Tümer; Abdullah Yıldırmış	1976
8	France	Baptiste Addis; Nicolas Bernardi; Jean-Charles Valladont	1974
9	India	Dhiraj Bommadevara; Mrinal Chauhan; Tushar Prabhakar Shelke	1973
10	Canada	Crispin Duenas; Deevang Gupta; Eric Peters	1971
11	Japan	Takaharu Furukawa; Junya Nakanishi; Fumiya Saito	1968
12	Italy	Federico Musolesi; Mauro Nespoli; Alessandro Paoli	1965
13	Indonesia	Arif Dwi Pangestu; Alviyanto Prastyadi; Riau Ega Agatha	1963
14	Australia	Peter Boukouvalas; Jai Crawley; Ryan Tyack	1960
15	Kazakhstan	Ilfat Abdullin; Sanzhar Mussayev; Dauletkeldi Zhangbyrbay	1957
16	Brazil	Marcus D'Almeida; Matheus Gomes; Matheus Zwick Ely	1954
17	Slovenia	Dan Habjan Malavasić; Žiga Ravnikar; Miha Rožič	1937
18	Mexico	Matías Grande; Carlos Rojas; Caleb Urbina	1936
19	Mongolia	Baatarkhuyagiin Otgonbold; Dorjsürengiin Dashnamjil; Jantsangiin Gantögs	1935
20	Switzerland	Keziah Chabin; Florian Faber; Thomas Rufer	1934
21	Israel	Roy Dror; Niv Frenkel; Itay Shanny	1932
22	Great Britain	Monty Orton; Alex Wise; James Woodgate	1932
23	Spain	Pablo Acha; Miguel Alvariño; Andrés Temiño	1932
24	Malaysia	Muhammad Syafiq Busthamin; Khairul Anuar Mohamad; Muhamad Zarif Syahiir Zolkepeli	1932
25	Bangladesh	Md Sagor Islam; Mohammad Hakim Ahmed Rubel; Ram Krishna Saha	1930
26	Ukraine	Oleksii Hunbin; Ivan Kozhokar; Artem Ovchynnikov	1924
27	Chile	Andrés Aguilar; Andrés Gallardo; Ricardo Soto	1919
28	Belgium	Théo Carbonetti; Jarno De Smedt; Elian Van Steen	1893
29	Vietnam	Hoàng Văn Lộc; Lê Quốc Phong; Nguyễn Duy	1889
30	Finland	Jouni Aartola; Antti Tekoniemi; Antti Vikström	1889
31	Luxembourg	Jerome Ansel; Jeff Henckels; Pit Klein	1889
32	Slovakia	Miroslav Duchoň; Juraj Duchoň; Daniel Medveczky	1884
33	Poland	Paweł Ceklarz; Oskar Kasprowski; Kacper Sierakowski	1883
34	Denmark	Christian Christensen; Ludvig Henriksen; Oliver Staudt	1869
35	Egypt	Aly Abdelar; Bahaaeldin Aly; Youssouf Tolba	1863
36	Thailand	Phonthakorn Chaisilp; Tanapat Pathairat; Witthaya Thamwong	1860
37	Serbia	Dragisa Jevtić; Mihajlo Stefanović; Marko Vulić	1858
38	Czech Republic	Michal Hlahůlek; Josef Křesala; Adam Li	1857
39	Georgia	Aleksandre Machavariani; Temur Makievi; Jaba Moseshvili	1855
40	Armenia	Andrey Hovhannisyan; Hamlet Poghosyan; Vasil Shahnazaryan	1834
41	Saudi Arabia	Abdulrahman Al-Musa; Rashed Al-subaie; Mansour Alwi	1828
42	Lithuania	Dalius Mačernius; Modestas Šliauteris; Emilis Tamulionis	1815
43	Estonia	Tanel Kaasik; Märt Oona; Hendrik Õun	1794
44	Hong Kong	Lau Chun Hei; Caleb Tong; Wan Chun Kit	1793
45	United States Virgin Islands	Bruce Arnold; Nicholas D'Amour; Mike Gerard	1740
46	Latvia	Toms Ābelis; Dāvis Blāze; Romans Sergejevs	1674
47	Ivory Coast	Franck Eyeni; Koffi Morokant; Gnagne N'Dri	1653

== Elimination round ==
=== Section 1 ===
1/12 finals
1	South Korea
Bye
17	Slovenia	2	50	52	53	52
16	Brazil	6	54	52	53	56
9	India	5	57	53	53	52	28
24	Malaysia	4	50	54	57	50	26
Bye
8	France
5	United States
Bye
21	Israel	4	53	54	56	55	26
12	Italy	5	53	56	56	53	28
13	Indonesia	6	55	54	58
20	Switzerland	0	54	53	51
Bye
4	Germany

1/8 finals
1	South Korea	6	56	57	58
16	Brazil	0	54	50	54
9	India	5	52	56	57	53
8	France	3	57	54	52	53
5	United States	0	54	52	53
12	Italy	6	55	57	56
13	Indonesia	5	53	52	56	52
4	Germany	3	53	54	54	51

Quarterfinals
1	South Korea	5	55	57	55
9	India	1	49	57	53
12	Italy	6	56	55	56	58
13	Indonesia	2	54	57	55	54

Semifinals
1	South Korea	6	57	59	56	58
12	Italy	2	56	53	58	54

=== Section 2 ===
1/12 finals
3	China
Bye
19	Mongolia	1	53	52	57
14	Australia	5	53	53	58
11	Japan	5	53	52	56	54	27
22	Great Britain	4	50	52	57	54	26
Bye
6	Chinese Taipei
7	Turkey
Bye
23	Spain	6	55	57	56
10	Canada	0	53	55	52
15	Kazakhstan	1	53	54	50
18	Mexico	5	57	54	57
Bye
2	Netherlands

1/8 finals
3	China	6	52	53	56
14	Australia	0	49	49	55
11	Japan	6	53	53	55
6	Chinese Taipei	0	52	52	54
7	Turkey	5	52	55	50	49	29
23	Spain	4	41	54	51	50	28
Mexico	0	49	52	54
2	Netherlands	6	54	54	56

Quarterfinals
3	China	2	55	56	52	54
11	Japan	6	54	58	53	55
7	Turkey	5	51	54	58	58	29
2	Netherlands	4	52	57	51	54	26

Semifinals
11	Japan	4	54	55	56	56	28
7	Turkey	5	52	53	57	57	29

== Final round ==
Semifinals
1	South Korea	6	57	59	56	58
12	Italy	2	56	53	58	54
11	Japan	4	54	55	56	56	28
7	Turkey	5	52	53	57	57	29

Finals
1	South Korea	6	56	55	56	57
7	Turkey	2	54	56	55	52
Third place
12	Italy	2	52	51	57	53
11	Japan	6	54	54	51	57
