= 2023 World Archery Championships =

International sports competition in Germany

2023 World Championships
- Location: Berlin, Germany
- Dates: 31 July – 6 August 2023
- Competitors: 531 from 81 nations

The 2023 World Archery Championships was held from 31 July to 6 August 2023 in Berlin, Germany. The event served as a qualification event for the 2024 Summer Olympics in Paris, France.

== Medals table ==
* Host nation (Germany)

Rank	Nation	Gold	Silver	Bronze	Total
1	India	3	0	1	4
2	South Korea	2	0	1	3
3	Germany*	1	1	0	2
3	Poland	1	1	0	2
3	Turkey	1	1	0	2
6	Czech Republic	1	0	0	1
6	United States	1	0	0	1
8	Mexico	0	3	1	4
9	Canada	0	1	0	1
9	Colombia	0	1	0	1
9	Denmark	0	1	0	1
9	France	0	1	0	1
13	Japan	0	0	2	2
13	Netherlands	0	0	2	2
15	Brazil	0	0	1	1
15	Italy	0	0	1	1
15	Luxembourg	0	0	1	1
Totals (17 entries)		10	10	10	30

== Medals summary ==
=== Recurve ===
Event	Gold	Silver	Bronze
Men's individual	Mete Gazoz; Turkey	Eric Peters; Canada	Marcus D'Almeida; Brazil
Women's individual	Marie Horáčková; Czech Republic	Alejandra Valencia; Mexico	Satsuki Noda; Japan
Men's team	South Korea; Kim Je-deok; Kim Woo-jin; Lee Woo-seok	Turkey; Mete Gazoz; Berkim Tümer; Abdullah Yıldırmış	Japan; Takaharu Furukawa; Junya Nakanishi; Fumiya Saito
Women's team	Germany; Katharina Bauer; Michelle Kroppen; Charline Schwarz	France; Audrey Adiceom; Lisa Barbelin; Caroline Lopez	Mexico; Aída Román; Ángela Ruiz; Alejandra Valencia
Mixed team	South Korea; Lim Si-hyeon; Kim Woo-jin	Germany; Michelle Kroppen; Florian Unruh	Italy; Tatiana Andreoli; Mauro Nespoli

=== Compound ===
Event	Gold	Silver	Bronze
Men's individual	Ojas Pravin Deotale; India	Łukasz Przybylski; Poland	Mike Schloesser; Netherlands
Women's individual	Aditi Gopichand Swami; India	Andrea Becerra; Mexico	Jyothi Surekha Vennam; India
Men's team	Poland; Rafał Dobrowolski; Przemysław Konecki; Łukasz Przybylski	Denmark; Tore Bjarnarson; Martin Damsbo; Mathias Fullerton	Netherlands; Sil Pater; Mike Schloesser; Jay Tjin-A-Djie
Women's team	India; Parneet Kaur; Aditi Gopichand Swami; Jyothi Surekha Vennam	Mexico; Andrea Becerra; Ana Sofía Hernández Jeon; Dafne Quintero	South Korea; Oh Yoo-hyun; So Chae-won; Song Yun-soo
Mixed team	United States; Alexis Ruiz; Sawyer Sullivan	Colombia; Sara López; Sebastián Arenas	Luxembourg; Mariya Shkolna; Gilles Seywert

== Participating nations ==
531 archers from 81 nations:

1. Algeria (2)
2. Armenia (3)
3. Australia (9)
4. Austria (6)
5. Azerbaijan (3)
6. Bangladesh (6)
7. Belgium (5)
8. Bolivia (2)
9. Brazil (8)
10. Bulgaria (2)
11. Canada (9)
12. Chad (1)
13. Chile (5)
14. China (6)
15. Chinese Taipei (12)
16. Colombia (8)
17. Croatia (6)
18. Cuba (1)
19. Cyprus (2)
20. Czech Republic (8)
21. Denmark (10)
22. Ecuador (4)
23. Egypt (6)
24. El Salvador (7)
25. Estonia (11)
26. Faroe Islands (4)
27. Finland (10)
28. France (12)
29. Georgia (6)
30. Germany (12)
31. Great Britain (12)
32. Greece (3)
33. Guinea (1)
34. Hong Kong (10)
35. Hungary (1)
36. Iceland (10)
37. India (12)
38. Indonesia (6)
39. Iraq (1)
40. Israel (8)
41. Italy (12)
42. Ivory Coast (5)
43. Japan (6)
44. Kazakhstan (12)
45. Latvia (4)
46. Lithuania (8)
47. Luxembourg (6)
48. Malaysia (10)
49. Mexico (12)
50. Moldova (4)
51. Mongolia (6)
52. Netherlands (12)
53. Norway (3)
54. Palestine (2)
55. Poland (12)
56. Portugal (7)
57. Puerto Rico (2)
58. Romania (5)
59. San Marino (3)
60. Saudi Arabia (6)
61. Serbia (7)
62. Singapore (5)
63. Slovakia (10)
64. Slovenia (9)
65. South Africa (4)
66. South Korea (12)
67. Spain (8)
68. Sri Lanka (1)
69. Sudan (1)
70. Sweden (7)
71. Switzerland (11)
72. Tajikistan (1)
73. Thailand (12)
74. Turkey (12)
75. Ukraine (7)
76. United Arab Emirates (5)
77. United States (12)
78. United States Virgin Islands (5)
79. Uzbekistan (6)
80. Venezuela (3)
81. Vietnam (6)
