= 2025 World Archery Championships – Women's individual recurve =

Women's individual recurve at the 2025 World Archery Championships
- Venue: Gwangju International Archery Center
- Location: Gwangju, South Korea
- Dates: 9–12 September
- Competitors: 123 from 50 nations

Medalists
gold medal	Kang Chae-young	South Korea
silver medal	Zhu Jingyi	China
bronze medal	An San	South Korea

The women's individual recurve competition at the 2025 World Archery Championships, which will take place from 9 to 12 September 2025 in Gwangju, South Korea.

== Schedule ==
All times are in Korea Standard Time (UTC+09:00).

Date	Time	Round
Monday, 8 September		Official practice
Tuesday, 9 September	09:00	Qualification round
Thursday, 11 September	09:15; 09:53; 10:30	Elimination Round; First Round (1/48); Second round (1/24); Third Round (1/16)
Friday, 12 September	10:02; 14:05; 15:00; 15:30; 15:42	Final Round; Fourth round (1/8); Quarter-finals; Semi-finals; Bronze-medal match Gold-medal match

== Qualification round ==
Results after 72 arrows.104 archers qualified to Elimination round.

High green denotes at least one round bye.
Light green denotes entering from first round.

Rank	Name	Nation	Score	10+X	X
1	An San	South Korea	692	45	18
2	Zhu Jingyi	China	691	45	16
3	Lim Si-hyeon	South Korea	689	44	20
4	Kang Chae-young	South Korea	689	44	18
5	Alejandra Valencia	Mexico	678	36	17
6	Deepika Kumari	India	677	39	13
7	Anastasia Pavlova	Ukraine	677	35	7
8	Li Jiaman	China	676	35	11
9	Elia Canales	Spain	673	31	6
10	Jennifer Mucino-Fernandez	United States	670	33	11
11	Casey Kaufhold	United States	668	34	5
12	Elif Berra Gökkır	Turkey	667	32	14
13	Dünya Yenihayat	Turkey	667	30	14
14	Gatha Anandrao Khadake	India	666	31	10
15	Marie Horáčková	Czech Republic	665	30	16
16	Chiu Yi-ching	Chinese Taipei	665	28	11
17	Huang Yuwei	China	664	29	8
18	Li Cai-xuan	Chinese Taipei	664	28	7
19	Katharina Bauer	Germany	664	26	13
20	Alexandra Mîrca	Moldova	662	27	8
21	Veronika Marchenko	Ukraine	662	24	8
22	Quinty Roeffen	Netherlands	661	30	12
23	Irati Unamunzaga Altuna	Spain	661	28	12
24	Hsu Hsin-tzu	Chinese Taipei	660	34	7
25	Chiara Rebagliati	Italy	660	30	8
26	Victoria Sebastian	France	660	27	4
27	Diananda Choirunisa	Indonesia	658	27	8
28	Nanami Asakuno	Japan	658	24	7
29	Loredana Spera	Italy	658	24	6
30	Ankita Bhakat	India	656	28	7
31	Catalina GNoriega	United States	656	24	9
32	Elisabeth Straka	Austria	655	30	11
33	Nurinisso Makhmudova	Individual Neutral Athletes	655	26	13
34	Roberta Di Francesco	Italy	655	22	3
35	Rezza Octavia	Indonesia	654	28	6
36	Amélie Cordeau	France	654	26	4
37	Ruka Uehara	Japan	654	24	7
38	Syaqiera Mashayikh	Malaysia	653	30	9
39	Ku Nurin Afiqah Ku Ruzaini	Malaysia	653	29	11
40	Alexandra Feeney	Australia	652	24	6
41	Žana Pintarič	Slovenia	652	23	5
42	Fatma Maraşlı	Turkey	651	23	5
43	Lộc Thị Đào	Vietnam	651	20	8
44	Lisa Barbelin	France	650	22	7
45	Tomomi Sugimoto	Japan	650	17	9
46	Kirstine Danstrup	Denmark	647	25	9
47	Megan Costall	Great Britain	647	19	8
48	Mădălina Amăistroaie	Romania	647	19	6
49	Hanna Marusava	Individual Neutral Athletes	647	18	1
50	Megan Havers	Great Britain	644	25	7
51	Thea Rogers	Great Britain	643	23	10
52	Poon Wei Tsing Natalie	Hong Kong	643	21	6
53	Elina Idensen	Germany	643	20	5
54	Lucía Ibáñez Romero	Spain	643	17	4
55	Valentina Vázquez	Mexico	643	17	3
56	Michelle Kroppen	Germany	643	15	6
57	Sima Aktar Shimu	Bangladesh	642	21	5
58	Reena Pärnat	Estonia	641	24	6
59	Ziyodakhon Abdusattorova	Uzbekistan	641	21	8
60	Ane Marcelle dos Santos	Brazil	641	19	5
61	Samiya Odinaeva	United Arab Emirates	640	24	8
62	Hoàng Thị Mai	Vietnam	638	23	9
63	Denisa Baránková	Slovakia	638	20	8
64	Ariana Nur Diana Mohamad Zairi	Malaysia	638	19	2
65	Natalia Leśniak	Poland	637	22	6
66	Irina Dashinimaeva	Individual Neutral Athletes	637	21	8
67	Laura Paeglis	Australia	637	19	4
68	Bishindeegiin Urantungalag	Mongolia	636	20	4
69	Alexandra Zemlyanova	Kazakhstan	636	17	5
70	Mikaella Moshe	Israel	635	17	7
71	Samira Zhumagulova	Kazakhstan	635	17	5
72	Asel Sharbekova	Kyrgyzstan	635	13	3
73	Ayu Mareta Dyasari	Indonesia	633	20	10
74	Ana Luiza Caetano	Brazil	631	17	5
75	Kasandra Berzan	Moldova	630	22	5
76	Laura van der Winkel	Netherlands	629	21	9
77	Diana Tursunbek	Kazakhstan	629	17	6
78	Anastasiya Nikifarenka	Individual Neutral Athletes	628	21	10
79	Ana Umer	Slovenia	627	23	11
80	Virginie Chénier	Canada	627	19	4
81	Viktoriia Nagornaia	Individual Neutral Athletes	627	18	4
82	Janna Hawash	Canada	627	17	6
83	Elena Bendíková	Slovakia	627	17	5
84	Trần Huyền Diệp	Serbia	627	627	5
85	Urška Čavič	Slovenia	626	14	3
86	Salome Kharshiladze	Georgia	625	16	5
87	Tsiko Putkaradze	Georgia	625	15	4
88	Nilufar Hamroeva	Uzbekistan	625	12	4
89	Graziela Paulino dos Santos	Brazil	625	11	5
90	Fleur van de Ven	Netherlands	620	16	3
91	Olha Chebotarenko	Ukraine	619	15	6
92	Karina Kozłowska	Poland	618	15	7
93	Triinu Lilienthal	Estonia	617	20	6
94	Giuliana Vernice Garcia	Philippines	617	13	3
95	Medea Gvinchidze	Georgia	616	14	5
96	Jasmina Nurmanova	Uzbekistan	614	16	4
97	Erika Jangnäs	Sweden	613	16	4
98	Wioleta Myszor	Poland	612	13	3
99	Fatima Huseynli	Azerbaijan	611	16	4
100	Dobromira Danailova	Bulgaria	610	13	5
101	Karime Montoya Alfaro	Mexico	608	16	7
102	Pia Bidaure	Philippines	606	12	1
103	Poon Yuk Hei	Hong Kong	605	13	4
104	Eleanor Brug	Canada	600	13	1
105	Shelley Hilton	Israel	599	15	3
106	Gabrielle Bidaure	Philippines	597	14	4
107	Nadejda Celan	Moldova	595	13	3
108	Dinar Bekbalieva	Kyrgyzstan	594	6	2
109	Diana Kanatbek Kyzy	Kyrgyzstan	589	15	6
110	Alexandra Zavala Tagata	Peru	589	10	3
111	Marín Hilmarsdóttir	Iceland	587	11	2
112	Lee Hiu Yau	Hong Kong	584	13	5
113	Valgerður Hjaltested	Iceland	584	10	2
114	Jana Ali	Egypt	580	8	1
115	Raya Ivanova	Bulgaria	578	7	1
116	Kristína Drusková	Slovakia	571	14	1
117	Anja Brkić	Serbia	570	13	2
118	Jindřiška Vaněčková	Czech Republic	561	5	2
119	Rasha Ahmed	Palestine	557	7	4
120	Astrid Daxböck	Iceland	497	6	2
121	Teona Jovanović	Serbia	495	5	1
122	Rasha Abouzamazem	Libya	473	3	0
123	Bojana Ivanović	Serbia	403	0	0

== Final round ==
Quarterfinals
1	(South Korea) An San	6	27	28	30	30
8	(China) Li Jiaman	2	29	27	26	29
5	(Mexico) Alejandra Valencia	0	29	29	22
4	(South Korea) Kang Chae-young	6	30	30	27
3	(South Korea) Lim Si-hyeon	4	27	30	27	28	28
27	(Indonesia) Diananda Choirunisa	6	28	25	28	26	29
7	(Ukraine) Anastasia Pavlova	2	28	28	29	22
2	(China) Zhu Jingyi	6	27	29	30	29

Semifinals
1	(South Korea) An San	4	29	30	27	27	26
4	(South Korea) Kang Chae-young	6	27	29	28	28	29
27	(Indonesia) Diananda Choirunisa	4	28	29	25	28	27
2	(China) Zhu Jingyi	6	26	30	28	27	28

Finals
4	(South Korea) Kang Chae-young	7	29	29	29	30	29
2	(China) Zhu Jingyi	3	29	28	29	30	28
Third place
1	(South Korea) An San	6	28	28	27	29	29
27	(Indonesia) Diananda Choirunisa	4	27	27	29	29	29

== Elimination round ==
(+) Won the shoot-off by arrow closer to the center of the target.

=== Section 1 ===
1/48 finals
33	(Individual Neutral Athletes) N Makhmudova	7	29	28	27	28
80	(Canada) V Chénier	1	26	28	25	25
81	(Individual Neutral Athletes) V Nagornaia	6	25	27	28	29
32	(Austria) E Straka	2	26	24	25	28
17	(China) Huang YW	6	27	28	29	29
96	(Uzbekistan) J Nurmanova	2	29	27	27	21
65	(Poland) N Leśniak	7	27	26	26	25	27
48	(Romania) M Amăistroaie	3	27	19	24	26	26
49	(Individual Neutral Athletes) H Marusava	2	28	24	22	26
64	(Malaysia) AND Mohamad Zairi	6	28	28	27	26
97	(Sweden) E Jangnäs	0	26	25	25
16	(Chinese Taipei) Chiu Y-c	6	27	28	28

1/24 finals
33	(Individual Neutral Athletes) N Makhmudova	6^{8+}	28	24	26	26	25
81	(Individual Neutral Athletes) V Nagornaia	5^{8}	26	27	25	26	27
17	(China) Huang YW	6	29	28	29
65	(Poland) N Leśniak	0	25	26	27
64	(Malaysia) AND Mohamad Zairi	6	27	26	30	30	27
16	(Chinese Taipei) Chiu Y-c	4	28	29	28	27	26

1/16 finals
1	(South Korea) An S	7	29	27	27	28
33	(Individual Neutral Athletes) N Makhmudova	1	26	24	27	25
17	(China) Huang YW	6	29	28	28
64	(Malaysia) AND Mohamad Zairi	0	27	26	25

1/8 finals
1	(South Korea) An S	6	28	28	26	29
17	(China) Huang YW	2	27	26	27	28

=== Section 2 ===
1/48 finals
9	(Spain) E Canales	6	29	28	27	28	27
104	(Canada) E Brug	4	29	25	27	28	27
57	(Bangladesh) SA Shimu	3	23	24	27	28	25
56	(Germany) M Kroppen	7	26	27	27	25	27
41	(Slovenia) Ž Pintarič	6^{9+}	24	24	26	26	28
72	(Kyrgyzstan) A Sharbekova	5^{9}	28	24	24	27	25
89	(Brazil) G Paulino dos Santos	1	27	27	27	26
24	(Chinese Taipei) Hsu H-t	7	29	29	27	28
25	(Italy) C Rebagliati	6	28	29	27
88	(Uzbekistan) N Hamroeva	0	27	25	26
73	(Indonesia) AM Dyasari	2	27	25	22	25
40	(Australia) A Feeney	6	25	26	27	26

1/24 finals
9	(Spain) E Canales	6	28	28	30
56	(Germany) M Kroppen	0	27	27	28
41	(Slovenia) Ž Pintarič	0	24	28	24
24	(Chinese Taipei) Hsu H-t	6	28	30	27
25	(Italy) C Rebagliati	6	28	29	26
40	(Australia) A Feeney	0	26	23	25

1/16 finals
9	(Spain) E Canales	3	29	28	28	29	27
24	(Chinese Taipei) Hsu H-t	7	30	29	25	29	28
25	(Italy) C Rebagliati	0	25	27	27
8	(China) Li JM	6	28	29	28

1/8 finals
24	(Chinese Taipei) Hsu H-t	1	24	28	28	25
8	(China) Li JM	7	25	28	29	27

=== Section 3 ===
1/48 finals
37	(Japan) R Uehara	6	21	27	24	30	30
76	(Netherlands) L van der Winkel	4	25	24	27	28	25
85	(Slovenia) U Čavič	0	28	25	23
28	(Japan) N Asakuno	6	29	28	27
21	(Ukraine) V Marchenko	7	26	30	30	28
92	(Poland) K Kozłowska	1	26	26	28	15
69	(Kazakhstan) A Zemlyanova	0	24	27	26
44	(France) L Barbelin	6	27	29	28
53	(Germany) E Idensen	0	26	28	27
60	(Brazil) AM dos Santos	2	27	29	28
101	(Mexico) K Montoya Alfaro	0	25	19	21
12	(Turkey) EB Gökkır	6	27	28	29

1/24 finals
37	(Japan) R Uehara	1	27	25	27	28
28	(Japan) N Asakuno	7	27	29	30	30
21	(Ukraine) V Marchenko	7	28	28	29	28
44	(France) L Barbelin	1	27	28	26	26
60	(Brazil) AM dos Santos	1	28	25	26	25
12	(Turkey) EB Gökkır	7	28	26	29	28

1/16 finals
5	(Mexico) A Valencia	6^{9}	29	28	27	28	26
28	(Japan) N Asakuno	5^{8}	28	29	28	27	26
21	(Ukraine) V Marchenko	3	27	27	27	28	27
12	(Turkey) EB Gökkır	7	27	28	29	27	28

1/8 finals
5	(Mexico) A Valencia	6^{9+}	29	26	29	28	29
12	(Turkey) EB Gökkır	5^{9}	26	28	29	28	29

=== Section 4 ===
1/48 finals
13	(Turkey) D Yenihayat	6	26	27	27
100	(Bulgaria) D Danailova	0	24	23	22
61	(United Arab Emirates) S Odinaeva	6	28	24	27	28
52	(Hong Kong) Poon WTN	2	22	27	26	23
45	(Japan) T Sugimoto	6	27	28	28
68	(Mongolia) Bishindeegiin U	0	26	23	26
93	(Estonia) T Lilienthal	2	27	26	28	24	26
20	(Moldova) A Mîrca	6	27	26	24	28	27
29	(Italy) L Spera	6	28	26	28	26
84	(Vietnam) Trần HD	2	29	25	26	25
77	(Kazakhstan) D Tursunbek	4	29	26	25	28	28
36	(France) A Cordeau	6	25	29	27	28	28

1/24 finals
13	(Turkey) D Yenihayat	6	29	28	29
61	(United Arab Emirates) S Odinaeva	0	25	26	27
45	(Japan) T Sugimoto	4	28	29	29	26	27
20	(Moldova) A Mîrca	6	27	26	30	29	28
29	(Italy) L Spera	3	28	28	27	25	27
36	(France) A Cordeau	7	30	28	25	28	30

1/16 finals
13	(Turkey) D Yenihayat	6	27	28	28	28	28
20	(Moldova) A Mîrca	4	28	28	18	28	27
36	(France) A Cordeau	4	26	29	27	29	26
4	(South Korea) Kang C-y	6	28	28	29	28	28

1/8 finals
13	(Turkey) D Yenihayat	1	29	26	28	26
4	(South Korea) Kang C-y	7	29	29	29	27

=== Section 5 ===
1/48 finals
35	(Indonesia) R Octavia	7	26	30	28	26	28
78	(Individual Neutral Athletes) A Nikifarenka	3	26	27	27	27	24
83	(Slovakia) E Bendíková	3	26	27	26	28	26
30	(India) A Bhakat	7	25	28	28	28	28
19	(Germany) K Bauer	6	26	28	24	29	28
94	(Philippines) G Garcia	4	28	25	26	22	23
67	(Australia) L Paeglis	6	27	29	24	27	26
46	(Denmark) K Danstrup	4	27	28	28	27	23
51	(United Kingdom) T Rogers	6	28	26	30
62	(Vietnam) Hoàng TM	0	24	25	26
99	(Azerbaijan) F Huseynli	1	26	25	26	24
12	(India) GA Khadake	7	26	27	27	28

1/24 finals
35	(Indonesia) R Octavia	0	27	28	26
30	(India) A Bhakat	6	28	29	28
19	(Germany) K Bauer	7	25	29	28	28	28
67	(Australia) L Paeglis	3	26	27	25	28	27
51	(United Kingdom) T Rogers	0	27	26	28
12	(India) GA Khadake	6	28	27	29

1/16 finals
3	(South Korea) Lim S-h	6	28	30	30	28
30	(India) A Bhakat	2	28	27	28	28
19	(Germany) K Bauer	4	26	27	28	28	27
12	(India) GA Khadake	6	28	27	27	28	28

1/8 finals
3	(South Korea) Lim S-h	6	30	28	29
12	(India) GA Khadake	0	26	25	24

=== Section 6 ===
1/48 finals
11	(United States) C Kaufhold	6	30	29	28
102	(Philippines) P Bidaure	0	27	21	25
59	(Uzbekistan) Z Abdusattorova	6	26	26	27	30	28
54	(Spain) L Ibáñez Romero	4	29	27	26	28	25
43	(Vietnam) Lộc TĐ	2	26	28	26	25
70	(Israel) M Moshe	6	28	25	27	28
91	(Ukraine) O Chebotarenko	1	23	25	26	27
22	(Netherlands) Q Roeffen	7	25	28	26	29
27	(Indonesia) D Choirunisa	7	30	28	26	28
86	(Georgia (country)) S Kharshiladze	1	27	28	18	26
75	(Moldova) K Berzan	6	28	27	27	25	24
38	(Malaysia) S Mashayikh	4	27	25	27	26	24

1/24 finals
11	(United States) C Kaufhold	6	25	28	29	28
59	(Uzbekistan) Z Abdusattorova	2	25	27	28	28
70	(Israel) M Moshe	1	27	26	28	25
22	(Netherlands) Q Roeffen	7	27	28	29	26
27	(Indonesia) D Choirunisa	7	28	29	28	29
75	(Moldova) K Berzan	1	24	26	28	20

1/16 finals
11	(United States) C Kaufhold	6	28	28	28	27	27
22	(Netherlands) Q Roeffen	4	27	29	29	26	26
27	(Indonesia) D Choirunisa	6	27	26	29	29	27
6	(India) D Kumari	4	25	28	27	29	27

1/8 finals
11	(United States) C Kaufhold	4	25	29	28	26	26
27	(Indonesia) D Choirunisa	6	28	26	27	29	28

=== Section 7 ===
1/48 finals
39	(Malaysia) KNA Ku Ruzaini	1	27	26	24	27
74	(Brazil) A S Caetano	7	27	27	27	28
87	(Georgia (country)) T Putkaradze	5^{7}	28	28	23	26	29
26	(France) V Sebastian	6^{10}	26	28	30	29	26
23	(Spain) I Unamunzaga Altuna	7	29	27	26	28
90	(Netherlands) F van de Ven	1	25	26	26	27
71	(Kazakhstan) S Zhumagulova	6	28	28	27	29
42	(Turkey) F Maraşlı	2	26	27	30	25
55	(Mexico) V Vázquez	7	28	28	29	27
58	(Estonia) R Pärnat	1	28	20	23	24
103	(Hong Kong) Poon YH	3	22	25	23	27	26
10	(United States) J Mucino-Fernandez	7	27	24	28	27	27

1/24 finals
74	(Brazil) A S Caetano	6^{X}	28	28	29	28	25
26	(France) V Sebastian	5^{7}	26	30	28	28	28
23	(Spain) I Unamunzaga Altuna	6	29	28	27	27
71	(Kazakhstan) S Zhumagulova	2	26	25	28	25
55	(Mexico) V Vázquez	6	24	27	26	26	29
10	(United States) J Mucino-Fernandez	4	24	25	27	26	28

1/16 finals
7	(Ukraine) A Pavlova	7	28	28	27	28
74	(Brazil) A S Caetano	1	28	26	26	27
23	(Spain) I Unamunzaga Altuna	7	28	26	25	28
55	(Mexico) V Vázquez	1	27	26	22	26

1/8 finals
7	(Ukraine) A Pavlova	7	27	30	27	26	27
23	(Spain) I Unamunzaga Altuna	3	24	28	27	27	26

=== Section 8 ===
1/48 finals
15	(Czech Republic) M Horáčková	6	26	26	29
98	(Poland) W Myszor	0	25	24	28
63	(Slovakia) D Baránková	7	29	26	26	25	27
50	(United Kingdom) M Havers	3	29	25	25	28	24
47	(United Kingdom) M Costall	0	26	29	25
66	(Individual Neutral Athletes) I Dashinimaeva	6	27	30	26
95	(Georgia (country)) M Gvinchidze	0	27	27	27
18	(Chinese Taipei) Li C-x	6	28	28	28
31	(United States) C GNoriega	4	28	27	26	27	27
82	(Canada) J Hawash	6	29	27	28	23	27
79	(Slovenia) A Umer	3	29	25	23	28	25
34	(Italy) R Di Francesco	7	27	28	28	28	27

1/24 finals
15	(Czech Republic) M Horáčková	2	27	27	29	25
63	(Slovakia) D Baránková	6	28	30	27	28
66	(Individual Neutral Athletes) I Dashinimaeva	0	26	25	25
18	(Chinese Taipei) Li C-x	6	28	26	29
82	(Canada) J Hawash	6	24	27	17	25	28
34	(Italy) R Di Francesco	4	23	25	24	25	28

1/16 finals
63	(Slovakia) D Baránková	2	25	28	27	27
18	(Chinese Taipei) Li C-x	6	28	27	28	28
82	(Canada) J Hawash	2	29	25	26	27
2	(China) Zhu JY	6	27	29	27	28

1/8 finals
18	(Chinese Taipei) Li C-x	1	27	25	25	25
2	(China) Zhu JY	7	27	29	29	26
