= 2025 World Archery Championships – Women's team recurve =

Women's team recurve at the 2025 World Archery Championships
- Venue: Gwangju International Archery Center
- Location: Gwangju, South Korea
- Dates: 9–10 September
- Competitors: 96 from 32 nations

Medalists
gold medal	Chiu Yi-ching; Hsu Hsin-tzu; Li Cai-xuan	Chinese Taipei
silver medal	Nanami Asakuno; Tomomi Sugimoto; Ruka Uehara	Japan
bronze medal	An San; Kang Chae-young; Lim Si-hyeon	South Korea

The women's team recurve competition at the 2025 World Archery Championships took place from 9 to 10 September 2025 in Gwangju, South Korea.

== Schedule ==
All times are in Korea Standard Time (UTC+09:00).

Date	Time	Round
Monday, 8 September		Official practice
Tuesday, 9 September	09:00; 14:15; 14:45; 15:15; 15:45	Qualification round First Round; Second round Quarterfinals; Semifinals
Wednesday, 10 September	15:59; 16:25	Bronze-medal match Gold-medal match

== Qualification round ==
Results after 216 arrows. The top 24 teams qualified to Elimination round.

High green denotes at least one round bye.
Light green denotes entering from first round.

Rank	Nation	Name	Score
1	South Korea	An San; Kang Chae-young; Lim Si-hyeon	2070 WR
2	China	Huang Yuwei; Li Jiaman; Zhu Jingyi	2031
3	India	Ankita Bhakat; Gatha Anandrao Khadake; Deepika Kumari	1999
4	United States	Catalina GNoriega; Casey Kaufhold; Jennifer Mucino-Fernandez	1994
5	Chinese Taipei	Chiu Yi-ching; Hsu Hsin-tzu; Li Cai-xuan	1989
6	Turkey	Elif Berra Gökkır; Fatma Maraşlı; Dünya Yenihayat	1985
7	Spain	Elia Canales; Lucía Ibáñez Romero; Irati Unamunzaga Altuna	1977
8	Italy	Roberta Di Francesco; Chiara Rebagliati; Loredana Spera	1973
9	France	Lisa Barbelin; Amélie Cordeau; Victoria Sebastian	1964
10	Japan	Nanami Asakuno; Tomomi Sugimoto; Ruka Uehara	1962
11	Ukraine	Olha Chebotarenko; Veronika Marchenko; Anastasia Pavlova	1958
12	Germany	Katharina Bauer; Elina Idensen; Michelle Kroppen	1950
13	Indonesia	Diananda Choirunisa; Ayu Mareta Dyasari; Rezza Octavia	1945
14	Malaysia	Ku Nurin Afiqah Ku Ruzaini; Syaqiera Mashayikh; Ariana Nur Diana Mohamad Zairi	1944
15	Great Britain	Megan Costall; Megan Havers; Thea Rogers	1934
16	Mexico	Karime Montoya Alfaro; Alejandra Valencia; Valentina Vázquez	1929
17	Vietnam	Hoàng Thị Mai; Lộc Thị Đào; Trần Huyền Diệp	1916
18	Netherlands	Quinty Roeffen; Fleur van de Ven; Laura van der Winkel	1910
19	Slovenia	Urška Čavič; Žana Pintarič; Ana Umer	1905
20	Kazakhstan	Diana Tursunbek; Alexandra Zemlyanova; Samira Zhumagulova	1900
21	Brazil	Ane Marcelle dos Santos; Graziela Paulino dos Santos; Ana Luiza Caetano	1897
22	Moldova	Kasandra Berzan; Nadejda Celan; Alexandra Mîrca	1887
23	Uzbekistan	Ziyodakhon Abdusattorova; Nilufar Hamroeva; Jasmina Nurmanova	1880
24	Poland	Karina Kozłowska; Natalia Leśniak; Wioleta Myszor	1867
25	Georgia	Medea Gvinchidze; Salome Kharshiladze; Tsiko Putkaradze	1866
26	Canada	Eleanor Brug; Virginie Chénier; Janna Hawash	1854
27	Slovakia	Denisa Baránková; Elena Bendíková; Kristína Drusková	1836
28	Hong Kong	Lee Hiu Yau; Poon Wei Tsing Natalie; Poon Yuk Hei	1832
29	Philippines	Pia Bidaure; Gabrielle Bidaure; Giuliana Vernice Garcia	1820
30	Kyrgyzstan	Dinar Bekbalieva; Diana Kanatbek Kyzy; Asel Sharbekova	1818
31	Iceland	Astrid Daxböck; Marín Hilmarsdóttir; Valgerður Hjaltested	1668
32	Serbia	Anja Brkić; Bojana Ivanović; Teona Jovanović	1468

== Elimination round ==
=== Top half ===
1/12 finals
17	Vietnam	5	54	57	57	56
16	Mexico	3	54	53	58	53
9	France	6	56	56	55
24	Poland	0	52	52	51
21	Brazil	2	54	51	54	53
12	Germany	6	54	54	54	55
13	Indonesia	4	58	54	54	53	25
20	Kazakhstan	5	54	53	56	54	26

1/8 finals
1	South Korea	6	55	55	55	57
17	Vietnam	2	54	55	55	56
9	France	3	57	49	52	55
8	Italy	5	57	50	53	55
5	Chinese Taipei	5	52	51	55	55	28
12	Germany	4	54	56	52	54	27
20	Kazakhstan	0	53	53	54
4	United States	6	54	56	55

Quarterfinals
1	South Korea	6	55	56	56	55
8	Italy	2	53	55	57	51
5	Chinese Taipei	5	56	56	55	54	28+
4	United States	4	53	50	56	57	28

Semifinals
1	South Korea	4	56	56	56	52	27
5	Chinese Taipei	5	57	54	53	53	28

=== Bottom half ===
1/12 finals
19	Slovenia	6	54	52	55
14	Malaysia	0	53	51	53
11	Ukraine	6	53	54	55
22	Moldova	0	48	53	52
23	Uzbekistan	2	48	54	54	53
10	Japan	6	55	53	55	57
15	Great Britain	4	51	54	56	52	26
18	Netherlands	5	56	53	57	53	28

1/8 finals
3	India	5	50	55	55
19	Slovenia	1	48	55	53
11	Ukraine	1	48	49	54
6	Turkey	5	53	57	54
7	Spain	3	52	58	53	51
10	Japan	5	53	53	53	55
18	Netherlands	2	56	50	49	55
2	China	6	51	58	55	58

Quarterfinals
3	India	6	51	55	57	55
6	Turkey	2	55	50	54	53
10	Japan	5	57	52	56
2	China	1	52	52	55

Semifinals
3	India	2	56	56	56	51
10	Japan	6	56	58	56	54

== Final round ==
Semifinals
1	South Korea	4	56	56	56	52	27
4	Chinese Taipei	5	57	54	53	53	28
3	India	2	56	56	56	51
10	Japan	6	56	58	56	54

Finals
4	Chinese Taipei	6	53	53	54
10	Japan	0	51	52	44
Third place
1	South Korea	5	54	57	54	58
3	India	3	51	57	57	56
