= Archery at the 2022 Asian Games – Women's individual recurve =

Women's individual recurve at the 2022 Asian Games
- Venue: Fuyang Yinhu Sports Centre
- Dates: 1–7 October 2023
- Competitors: 84 from 29 nations

Medalists
gold medal	Lim Si-hyeon	South Korea
silver medal	An San	South Korea
bronze medal	Li Jiaman	China

The women's individual recurve archery competition at the 2022 Asian Games was held from 1 to 7 October 2023 at Fuyang Yinhu Sports Centre.

A total of 84 archers participated in the ranking round. Only the top two archers from each country were allowed to progress to the knockout stage.

== Schedule ==
All times are China Standard Time (UTC+08:00)

Date	Time	Event
Sunday, 1 October 2023	14:20	Qualification round
Monday, 2 October 2023	16:15	1/32 eliminations
Monday, 2 October 2023	16:45	1/16 eliminations
Monday, 2 October 2023	17:15	1/8 eliminations
Tuesday, 3 October 2023	13:00	Quarterfinals
Tuesday, 3 October 2023	15:40	Semifinals
Saturday, 7 October 2023	10:30	Bronze medal match
Saturday, 7 October 2023	10:50	Gold medal match

== Results ==
=== Qualification round ===
Rank	Seed	Athlete	Half		Total	10s	Xs
Rank	Seed	Athlete	1st	2nd	Total	10s	Xs
1	1	Lim Si-hyeon (KOR)	334	344	678	38	13
2	2	Hailigan (CHN)	335	341	676	34	12
3	3	An San (KOR)	338	334	672	33	13
4	—	Choi Mi-sun (KOR)	335	337	672	33	10
5	—	Kang Chae-young (KOR)	334	334	668	30	8
6	4	Li Jiaman (CHN)	327	339	666	31	7
7	—	An Qixuan (CHN)	330	333	663	26	5
8	—	Zhang Mengyao (CHN)	329	328	657	25	12
9	5	Satsuki Noda (JPN)	321	335	656	27	9
10	6	Diananda Choirunisa (INA)	325	331	656	23	2
11	7	Tomomi Sugimoto (JPN)	321	332	653	23	6
12	8	Lei Chien-ying (TPE)	325	328	653	21	6
13	9	Chiu Yi-ching (TPE)	316	335	651	19	8
14	10	Ankita Bhakat (IND)	316	333	649	26	9
15	11	Đỗ Thị Ánh Nguyệt (VIE)	319	328	647	17	10
16	12	Medina Murat (KAZ)	324	321	645	19	6
17	13	Nguyễn Thị Thanh Nhi (VIE)	309	332	641	24	6
18	14	Bhajan Kaur (IND)	311	329	640	24	6
19	—	Simranjeet Kaur (IND)	314	326	640	22	4
20	15	Syaqiera Mashayikh (MAS)	303	336	639	27	4
21	—	Peng Chia-mao (TPE)	309	328	637	22	4
22	—	Kuo Tzu-ying (TPE)	316	321	637	21	6
23	—	Hoàng Phương Thảo (VIE)	316	319	635	22	5
24	—	Hoàng Thị Mai (VIE)	309	324	633	19	8
25	16	Ziyodakhon Abdusattorova (UZB)	308	324	632	22	5
26	17	Diya Siddique (BAN)	313	319	632	18	9
27	18	Alina Ilyassova (KAZ)	309	322	631	22	5
28	19	Sima Aktar Shimu (BAN)	310	321	631	12	5
29	20	Nilufar Hamroeva (UZB)	309	319	628	20	6
30	—	Azusa Yamauchi (JPN)	311	316	627	14	4
31	21	Ku Nurin Afiqah (MAS)	311	315	626	20	6
32	—	Alua Mukhtarkhanova (KAZ)	308	318	626	18	6
33	22	Pak Hyang-sun (PRK)	314	309	623	17	6
34	23	Rezza Octavia (INA)	308	313	621	19	4
35	—	Gaukhar Igibayeva (KAZ)	304	316	620	16	4
36	24	Kang Un-ju (PRK)	300	319	619	14	5
37	25	Aisha Al-Ali (UAE)	300	318	618	17	3
38	26	Mobina Fallah (IRI)	309	309	618	13	6
39	27	Yasna Pourmahani (IRI)	309	308	617	16	7
40	—	Zahra Nemati (IRI)	305	311	616	18	2
41	28	Altangereliin Enkhtuyaa (MGL)	310	306	616	14	6
42	29	Ölziikhutagiin Khaliun (MGL)	310	305	615	15	6
43	30	Natalie Poon (HKG)	314	301	615	15	5
44	31	Sataporn Artsalee (THA)	314	301	615	14	5
45	32	Narisara Khunhiranchaiyo (THA)	299	312	611	9	2
46	—	Punika Jongkraijak (THA)	293	316	609	15	6
47	33	Mavzuna Azimova (TJK)	298	309	607	11	4
48	34	Abby Bidaure (PHI)	299	307	606	11	2
49	35	Cheng Yik Kiu (HKG)	298	305	603	13	5
50	—	Jargalsaikhany Dagiijanchiv (MGL)	301	301	602	12	1
51	—	Nurul Izzah Mazlan (MAS)	296	304	600	10	5
52	36	Diana Al-Daoud (JOR)	295	302	597	15	2
53	—	Ri Song-bok (PRK)	288	308	596	11	5
54	—	Bishindeegiin Urantungalag (MGL)	300	296	596	10	4
55	—	Prachi Singh (IND)	292	301	593	10	5
56	—	Wang Cheuk Ying (HKG)	287	303	590	10	1
57	37	Sonam Dema (BHU)	283	302	585	11	5
58	—	Nur Ain Ayuni Fozi (MAS)	288	297	585	9	3
59	—	Ada Lam (HKG)	292	291	583	11	5
60	38	Reem Al-Naqeeb (KUW)	286	296	582	10	1
61	39	Haya Al-Hajri (QAT)	285	296	581	12	3
62	—	Anindya Nayla Putri (INA)	274	307	581	8	1
63	40	Pyae Sone Hnin (MYA)	286	292	578	13	1
64	41	Diana Kanatbek Kyzy (KGZ)	275	292	567	14	3
65	42	Pia Bidaure (PHI)	271	295	566	12	5
66	—	Famida Sultana Nisha (BAN)	275	287	562	9	3
67	—	Beauty Ray (BAN)	272	289	561	9	2
68	43	Sarah Saloum (KSA)	283	277	560	8	2
69	44	Shaden Al-Marshud (KSA)	279	280	559	14	2
70	45	Sonam Choden (BHU)	264	287	551	10	3
71	—	Sabina Jurakulova (UZB)	271	271	542	6	1
72	46	Hessa Al-Awadhi (UAE)	262	276	538	9	0
73	—	Bibihojar Yuldosheva (UZB)	269	266	535	5	3
74	47	Soad Al-Bahar (KUW)	278	253	531	7	3
75	—	Dalal Al-Mugairin (KSA)	269	242	511	5	1
76	—	Chunyaphak Kanjana (THA)	250	259	509	9	3
77	48	Manju Bajgain (NEP)	250	256	506	1	0
78	—	Noor Al-Sharhan (KUW)	239	250	489	4	0
79	—	Catharine Thea Darma (INA)	237	245	482	5	1
80	—	Aya Felemban (KSA)	229	250	479	4	3
81	49	Nighat Naheed (PAK)	202	257	459	6	1
82	50	Hend Hamoud (YEM)	148	181	329	4	2
83	51	Atheer Al-Husaini (YEM)	143	181	324	1	0
84	—	Ebtisam Majrad (YEM)	149	138	287	1	0

=== Knockout round ===
==== Finals ====
Quarterfinals
1	Lim Si-hyeon (KOR)	28	28	29	30	6
9	Chiu Yi-ching (TPE)	25	29	25	27	2
5	Satsuki Noda (JPN)	21	25	27	0
4	Li Jiaman (CHN)	28	28	28	6
3	An San (KOR)	28	27	30	27	29	7
6	Diananda Choirunisa (INA)	28	27	28	27	28	3
7	Tomomi Sugimoto (JPN)	27	27	26	28	28	3
2	Hailigan (CHN)	24	28	29	28	29	7

Semifinals
1	Lim Si-hyeon (KOR)	28	30	29	27	28	10	6
4	Li Jiaman (CHN)	29	27	29	27	28	9	5
3	An San (KOR)	30	28	28	28	30	7
2	Hailigan (CHN)	30	25	28	28	25	3

Gold medal match
1	Lim Si-hyeon (KOR)	29	29	29	6
3	An San (KOR)	26	26	28	0
Bronze medal match
4	Li Jiaman (CHN)	29	29	29	6
2	Hailigan (CHN)	28	28	27	0

==== Section 1 ====
1/32 eliminations
33	Mavzuna Azimova (TJK)	22	27	26	25	24	3
32	Narisara Khunhiranchaiyo (THA)	28	26	26	26	27	7
17	Diya Siddique (BAN)	26	27	28	6
48	Manju Bajgain (NEP)	21	16	21	0
49	Nighat Naheed (PAK)	13	18	17	0
16	Ziyodakhon Abdusattorova (UZB)	28	25	26	6

1/16 eliminations
1	Lim Si-hyeon (KOR)	30	29	30	6
32	Narisara Khunhiranchaiyo (THA)	26	24	27	0
17	Diya Siddique (BAN)	27	28	26	29	6
16	Ziyodakhon Abdusattorova (UZB)	27	26	26	26	2

1/8 eliminations
1	Lim Si-hyeon (KOR)	29	29	27	6
17	Diya Siddique (BAN)	25	24	26	0

==== Section 2 ====
1/32 eliminations									1/16 eliminations								1/8 eliminations
									9	Chiu Yi-ching (TPE)	26	28	27	27	28	7
41	Diana Kanatbek Kyzy (KGZ)	20	23	22				0	24	Kang Un-ju (PRK)	27	26	27	15	26	3
24	Kang Un-ju (PRK)	27	27	28				6									9	Chiu Yi-ching (TPE)	27	28	27	27	28	6
25	Aisha Al-Ali (UAE)	24	27	23	28	28	6	5									8	Lei Chien-ying (TPE)	27	27	29	27	27	4
40	Pyae Sone Hnin (MYA)	26	27	27	25	27	9	6	40	Pyae Sone Hnin (MYA)	25	25	28	26		2
									8	Lei Chien-ying (TPE)	29	28	28	26		6

==== Section 3 ====
1/32 eliminations							1/16 eliminations									1/8 eliminations
							5	Satsuki Noda (JPN)	26	25	28	24	25	10	6
37	Sonam Dema (BHU)	19	26	26	24	2	28	Altangereliin Enkhtuyaa (MGL)	20	19	28	26	26	9	5
28	Altangereliin Enkhtuyaa (MGL)	25	23	28	26	6										5	Satsuki Noda (JPN)	26	28	28	28	27	6
21	Ku Nurin Afiqah (MAS)	25	28	26		6										21	Ku Nurin Afiqah (MAS)	28	28	26	28	24	4
44	Shaden Al-Marshud (KSA)	20	23	22		0	21	Ku Nurin Afiqah (MAS)	30	24	29	24	29	10	6
							12	Medina Murat (KAZ)	24	25	25	27	29	8	5

==== Section 4 ====
1/32 eliminations								1/16 eliminations						1/8 eliminations
								13	Nguyễn Thị Thanh Nhi (VIE)	26	29	28	6
45	Sonam Choden (BHU)	19	25	24			0	20	Nilufar Hamroeva (UZB)	23	26	27	0
20	Nilufar Hamroeva (UZB)	26	29	27			6							13	Nguyễn Thị Thanh Nhi (VIE)	26	28	28	24	27	3
29	Ölziikhutagiin Khaliun (MGL)	25	26	25	25	28	6							4	Li Jiaman (CHN)	27	27	28	26	28	7
36	Diana Al-Daoud (JOR)	26	25	25	20	28	4	29	Ölziikhutagiin Khaliun (MGL)	27	24	27	0
								4	Li Jiaman (CHN)	28	29	29	6

==== Section 5 ====
1/32 eliminations
35	Cheng Yik Kiu (HKG)	26	28	25	23	24	4
30	Natalie Poon (HKG)	24	25	27	26	25	6
19	Sima Aktar Shimu (BAN)	27	28	27	6
46	Hessa Al-Awadhi (UAE)	18	23	23	0
51	Atheer Al-Husaini (YEM)	7	12	2	0
14	Bhajan Kaur (IND)	28	27	30	6

1/16 eliminations
3	An San (KOR)	28	28	28	30	7
30	Natalie Poon (HKG)	24	26	28	29	1
19	Sima Aktar Shimu (BAN)	25	26	26	0
14	Bhajan Kaur (IND)	27	28	29	6

1/8 eliminations
3	An San (KOR)	27	28	28	28	28	7
14	Bhajan Kaur (IND)	28	25	28	27	27	3

==== Section 6 ====
1/32 eliminations								1/16 eliminations									1/8 eliminations
								11	Đỗ Thị Ánh Nguyệt (VIE)	25	28	29				6
43	Sarah Saloum (KSA)	23	25	23			0	22	Pak Hyang-sun (PRK)	21	25	28				0
22	Pak Hyang-sun (PRK)	29	28	27			6										11	Đỗ Thị Ánh Nguyệt (VIE)	25	23	27	25	2
27	Yasna Pourmahani (IRI)	25	21	25	25	28	6										6	Diananda Choirunisa (INA)	27	26	26	29	6
38	Reem Al-Naqeeb (KUW)	23	27	29	22	21	4	27	Yasna Pourmahani (IRI)	28	28	27	26	26	8	5
								6	Diananda Choirunisa (INA)	26	29	28	25	26	9	6

==== Section 7 ====
1/32 eliminations								1/16 eliminations									1/8 eliminations
								7	Tomomi Sugimoto (JPN)	29	28	29	28			7
39	Haya Al-Hajri (QAT)	25	24	26	18	22	4	26	Mobina Fallah (IRI)	29	26	27	24			1
26	Mobina Fallah (IRI)	29	23	23	26	27	6										7	Tomomi Sugimoto (JPN)	28	27	24	26	26	7
23	Rezza Octavia (INA)	23	28	25			6										23	Rezza Octavia (INA)	27	28	22	26	25	3
42	Pia Bidaure (PHI)	21	24	22			0	23	Rezza Octavia (INA)	27	27	28	25	25	10	6
								10	Ankita Bhakat (IND)	26	28	27	25	26	9	5

==== Section 8 ====
1/32 eliminations
15	Syaqiera Mashayikh (MAS)	27	26	28	6
50	Hend Hamoud (YEM)	16	7	25	0
47	Soad Al-Bahar (KUW)	20	26	21	0
18	Alina Ilyassova (KAZ)	26	30	30	6
31	Sataporn Artsalee (THA)	27	28	23	27	6
34	Abby Bidaure (PHI)	26	27	24	25	2

1/16 eliminations
15	Syaqiera Mashayikh (MAS)	24	26	28	6
18	Alina Ilyassova (KAZ)	23	25	25	0
31	Sataporn Artsalee (THA)	26	28	25	0
2	Hailigan (CHN)	29	30	28	6

1/8 eliminations
15	Syaqiera Mashayikh (MAS)	24	26	27	25	27	3
2	Hailigan (CHN)	27	24	27	26	28	7
