= 2025 Archery World Cup =

International archery competition

- Sport: Archery
- Duration: 8 April – 19 October
- Recurve Men: (gold) (United States) Brady Ellison; (silver) (Brazil) Marcus D'Almeida; (bronze) (France) Thomas Chirault
- Recurve Women: (gold) (South Korea) An San; (silver) (Chinese Taipei) Hsu Hsin-tzu; (bronze) (South Korea) Kang Chae-young
- Compound Men: (gold) (Turkey) Emircan Haney; (silver) (Denmark) Mathias Fullerton; (bronze) (Netherlands) Mike Schloesser
- Compound Women: (gold) (Mexico) Andrea Becerra; (gold) (India) Jyothi Surekha; (bronze) (United Kingdom) Ella Gibson

Seasons
- ← 2024 2026 →

The 2025 Archery World Cup, also known as the Hyundai Archery World Cup for sponsorship reasons, was the 19th edition of the international archery circuit organised annually by World Archery. The 2025 World Cup consisted of five events, and ran from 8 April to 19 October. The first four stages were open to archers who have recorded a score that exceeds a minimum competition standard. For the final stage, only 8 archers are invited per category. Stage winners automatically qualify for the final, as well as one archer from the host nation. The remaining spots are filled based on the Hyundai Archery World Cup Ranking points.

World Archery decided to officially test several major rule changes at the third stage held in Antalya, Türkiye. The first change is the X-ring counting for 11 points. The second change is qualifying taking place over 60 arrows rather than the usual 72.

== Calendar ==
The calendar for the 2025 World Cup, announced by World Archery.

Stage	Date	Location	Ref.
1	8–13 April	Auburndale, United States (Note: The city of Auburndale uses its competition name during the tournament: Central Florida.)	
2	6–11 May	Shanghai, China	
3	3–8 June	(Turkey) Antalya, Türkiye	
4	8–13 July	Madrid, Spain	
Final	17–19 October	Nanjing, China	

== Results ==
=== Recurve ===
==== Men's individual ====
Stage	Venue	1st place, gold medalist(s)	2nd place, silver medalist(s)	3rd place, bronze medalist(s)
1	(United States) Central Florida	Florian Unruh (GER)	Mete Gazoz (TUR)	Dhiraj Bommadevara (IND)
2	(China) Shanghai	Kim Woo-jin (KOR)	Matías Grande (MEX)	Parth Salunkhe (IND)
3	(Turkey) Antalya	Marcus D'Almeida (BRA)	Buianto Tsyrendorzhiev (AIN)	Baptiste Addis (FRA)
4	(Spain) Madrid	Matías Grande (MEX)	Baptiste Addis (FRA)	Kim Je-deok (KOR)
Final	(China) Nanjing	Brady Ellison (USA)	Marcus D'Almeida (BRA)	Thomas Chirault (FRA)

==== Women's individual ====
Stage	Venue	1st place, gold medalist(s)	2nd place, silver medalist(s)	3rd place, bronze medalist(s)
1	(United States) Central Florida	Penny Healey (GBR)	Alejandra Valencia (MEX)	Li Jiaman (CHN)
2	(China) Shanghai	Lee Ga-hyun (KOR)	Lim Si-hyeon (KOR)	Deepika Kumari (IND)
3	(Turkey) Antalya	Lim Si-hyeon (KOR)	An San (KOR)	Casey Kaufhold (USA)
4	(Spain) Madrid	Kang Chae-young (KOR)	Hsu Hsin-tzu (TPE)	Li Jiaman (CHN)
Final	(China) Nanjing	An San (KOR)	Hsu Hsin-tzu (TPE)	Kang Chae-young (KOR)

==== Men's team ====
Stage	Venue	1st place, gold medalist(s)	2nd place, silver medalist(s)	3rd place, bronze medalist(s)
1	(United States) Central Florida	China; Kao Wenchao; Li Zhongyuan; Wang Yan	India; Dhiraj Bommadevara; Atanu Das; Tarundeep Rai	Chinese Taipei; Su Yu-yang; Tai Yu-hsuan; Tang Chih-chun
2	(China) Shanghai	South Korea; Kim Je-deok; Kim Woo-jin; Lee Woo-seok	France; Baptiste Addis; Thomas Chirault; Jean-Charles Valladont	United States; Brady Ellison; Christian Stoddard; Jack Williams
3	(Turkey) Antalya	South Korea; Kim Je-deok; Kim Woo-jin; Lee Woo-seok	Germany; Florian Unruh; Jonathan Vetter; Moritz Wieser	France; Baptiste Addis; Thomas Chirault; Jean-Charles Valladont
4	(Spain) Madrid	France; Baptiste Addis; Thomas Chirault; Jean-Charles Valladont	United States; Trenton Cowles; Brady Ellison; Christian Stoddard	South Korea; Kim Je-deok; Kim Woo-jin; Lee Woo-seok

==== Women's team ====
Stage	Venue	1st place, gold medalist(s)	2nd place, silver medalist(s)	3rd place, bronze medalist(s)
1	(United States) Central Florida	China; Huang Yuwei; Li Jiaman; Zhu Jingyi	United States; Catalina GNoriega; Casey Kaufhold; Jennifer Mucino-Fernandez	Chinese Taipei; Chiu Yi-ching; Hsu Hsin-tzu; Li Cai-xuan
2	(China) Shanghai	South Korea; An San; Kang Chae-young; Lim Si-hyeon	China; Huang Yuwei; Li Jiaman; Zhu Jingyi	Chinese Taipei; Kuo Tzu-ying; Li Tsai-chi; Shih Meng-chun
3	(Turkey) Antalya	United States; Catalina GNoriega; Casey Kaufhold; Jennifer Mucino-Fernandez	Italy; Roberta Di Francesco; Chiara Rebagliati; Loredana Spera	South Korea; An San; Kang Chae-young; Lim Si-hyeon
4	(Spain) Madrid	South Korea; An San; Kang Chae-young; Lim Si-hyeon	China; Bao Yijing; Li Jiaman; Zhu Jingyi	United States; Catalina GNoriega; Casey Kaufhold; Jennifer Mucino-Fernandez

==== Mixed team ====
Stage	Venue	1st place, gold medalist(s)	2nd place, silver medalist(s)	3rd place, bronze medalist(s)
1	(United States) Central Florida	Mexico; Alejandra Valencia; Matías Grande	Spain; Elia Canales; Pablo Acha	Germany; Michelle Kroppen; Florian Unruh
2	(China) Shanghai	South Korea; Lim Si-hyeon; Kim Woo-jin	China; Li Jiaman; Wang Yan	Turkey; Dünya Yenihayat; Mete Gazoz
3	(Turkey) Antalya	South Korea; Lim Si-hyeon; Kim Woo-jin	Germany; Katharina Bauer; Florian Unruh	Japan; Yuya Funahashi; Satsuki Tokugawa
4	(Spain) Madrid	United States; Jennifer Mucino-Fernandez; Brady Ellison	South Korea; Lim Si-hyeon; Lee Woo-seok	Chinese Taipei; Chiu Yi-ching; Tang Chih-chun

=== Compound ===
==== Men's individual ====
Stage	Venue	1st place, gold medalist(s)	2nd place, silver medalist(s)	3rd place, bronze medalist(s)
1	(United States) Central Florida	Mathias Fullerton (DEN)	Sebastián García (MEX)	Chen Chieh-lun (TPE)
2	(China) Shanghai	Mike Schloesser (NED)	Choi Yong-hee (KOR)	Rishabh Yadav (IND)
3	(Turkey) Antalya	Nicolas Girard (FRA)	Nick Kappers (USA)	Emircan Haney (TUR)
4	(Spain) Madrid	Mike Schloesser (NED)	Emircan Haney (TUR)	Nicolas Girard (FRA)
Final	(China) Nanjing	Emircan Haney (TUR)	Mathias Fullerton (DEN)	Mike Schloesser (NED)

==== Women's individual ====
Stage	Venue	1st place, gold medalist(s)	2nd place, silver medalist(s)	3rd place, bronze medalist(s)
1	(United States) Central Florida	Andrea Becerra (MEX)	Olivia Dean (USA)	Mariana Bernal (MEX)
2	(China) Shanghai	Madhura Dhamangaonkar (IND)	Carson Krahe (USA)	Hazal Burun (TUR)
3	(Turkey) Antalya	Andrea Becerra (MEX)	Han Seung-yeon (KOR)	Alexis Ruiz (USA)
4	(Spain) Madrid	Ella Gibson (GBR)	Jyothi Surekha Vennam (IND)	Han Seung-yeon (KOR)
Final	(China) Nanjing	Andrea Becerra (MEX)	Jyothi Surekha (IND)	Ella Gibson (GBR)

==== Men's team ====
Stage	Venue	1st place, gold medalist(s)	2nd place, silver medalist(s)	3rd place, bronze medalist(s)
1	(United States) Central Florida	United States; James Lutz; Kris Schaff; Sawyer Sullivan	Italy; Marco Bruno; Elia Fregnan; Michea Godano	India; Ojas Pravin Deotale; Abhishek Verma; Rishabh Yadav
2	(China) Shanghai	India; Ojas Pravin Deotale; Abhishek Verma; Rishabh Yadav	Mexico; Sebastián García; Rodrigo González; Luis Lezama	Denmark; Nicklas Bredal Bryld; Martin Damsbo; Mathias Fullerton
3	(Turkey) Antalya	Denmark; Rasmus Bramsen; Martin Damsbo; Mathias Fullerton	Turkey; Batuhan Akçaoğlu; Emircan Haney; Yağız Sezgin	South Korea; Choi Eun-gyu; Choi Yong-hee; Kim Jong-ho
4	(Spain) Madrid	South Korea; Choi Eun-gyu; Choi Yong-hee; Kim Jong-ho	France; Jean-Philippe Boulch; François Dubois; Nicolas Girard	United States; Curtis Broadnax; Jesse Clayton; James Lutz

==== Women's team ====
Stage	Venue	1st place, gold medalist(s)	2nd place, silver medalist(s)	3rd place, bronze medalist(s)
1	(United States) Central Florida	Mexico; Andrea Becerra; Mariana Bernal; Dafne Quintero	Italy; Giulia Di Nardo; Elisa Roner; Marcella Tonioli	United States; Olivia Dean; Alexis Ruiz; Abigail Winterton
2	(China) Shanghai	Mexico; Andrea Becerra; Mariana Bernal; Adriana Castillo	India; Madhura Dhamangaonkar; Chikitha Taniparthi; Jyothi Surekha Vennam	Turkey; Hazal Burun; Emine Rabia Oğuz; Begüm Yuva
3	(Turkey) Antalya	South Korea; Han Seung-yeon; Sim Soo-in; So Chae-won	Mexico; Andrea Becerra; Mariana Bernal; Adriana Castillo	United States; Olivia Dean; Alexis Ruiz; Abigail Winterton
4	(Spain) Madrid	Chinese Taipei; Chen Yi-hsuan; Chiu Yu-erh; Huang I-jou	India; Parneet Kaur; Prithika Pradeep; Jyothi Surekha Vennam	South Korea; Han Seung-yeon; Sim Soo-in; So Chae-won

==== Mixed team ====
Stage	Venue	1st place, gold medalist(s)	2nd place, silver medalist(s)	3rd place, bronze medalist(s)
1	(United States) Central Florida	India; Jyothi Surekha Vennam; Rishabh Yadav	Chinese Taipei; Huang I-jou; Chen Chieh-lun	Slovenia; Toja Ellison; Tim Jevšnik
2	(China) Shanghai	Great Britain; Ella Gibson; Ajay Scott	Turkey; Hazal Burun; Batuhan Akçaoğlu	India; Madhura Dhamangaonkar; Abhishek Verma
3	(Turkey) Antalya	United States; Alexis Ruiz; Curtis Broadnax	Germany; Katharina Raab; Paolo Kunsch	Estonia; Meeri-Marita Paas; Robin Jäätma
4	(Spain) Madrid	Netherlands; Sanne de Laat; Mike Schloesser	South Korea; So Chae-won; Choi Yong-hee	India; Jyothi Surekha Vennam; Rishabh Yadav

== Medals table ==
Rank	Nation	Gold	Silver	Bronze	Total
1	South Korea	13	6	7	26
2	Mexico	7	5	1	13
3	United States	5	5	7	17
4	India	3	5	7	15
5	Great Britain	3	0	1	4
5	Netherlands	3	0	1	4
7	France	2	3	4	9
8	China	2	3	2	7
9	Denmark	2	1	1	4
10	Turkey	1	4	4	9
11	Chinese Taipei	1	3	5	9
12	Germany	1	3	1	5
13	Brazil	1	1	0	2
14	Italy	0	3	0	3
15	Individual Neutral Athletes	0	1	0	1
15	Spain	0	1	0	1
17	Estonia	0	0	1	1
17	Japan	0	0	1	1
17	Slovenia	0	0	1	1
Totals (19 entries)		44	44	44	132
