= Archery at the 2025 Summer World University Games – Women's team recurve =

Women's team recurve at the 2025 Summer World University Games
- Venue: Sportpark am Hallo (qualification); Zollverein Coal Mine Industrial Complex (finals)
- Location: Essen, Germany
- Dates: 22 – 25 July 2025
- Competitors: 54 from 18 nations

Medalists
gold medal	Nanami Asakuno; Waka Sonoda; Ruka Uehara	Japan
silver medal	Fong You-jhu; Kuo Tzu-ying; Li Cai-xuan	Chinese Taipei
bronze medal	Huang Yuwei; Liu Yanxiu; Wu Zihan	China

The women's team recurve archery competition at the 2025 Summer World University Games was held at the Sportpark am Hallo and the Zollverein Coal Mine Industrial Complex in Essen, Germany from 22 to 25 July 2025.

== Records ==
Prior to the competition, the world and Universiade records were as follows.

- 216 arrows qualification round

Category	Team	Athlete	Score	Record	Date	Place	Event
World record	South Korea	Kang Chae-young	691	2053	21 May 2018	Antalya, Turkey	2018 Archery World Cup second stage
World record	South Korea	Chang Hye-jin	683	2053	21 May 2018	Antalya, Turkey	2018 Archery World Cup second stage
World record	South Korea	Lee Eun-gyeong	679	2053	21 May 2018	Antalya, Turkey	2018 Archery World Cup second stage
Universiade record	South Korea (KOR)	Ki Bo-bae	686	2038	4 July 2015	Gwangju, South Korea	2015 Summer Universiade
Universiade record	South Korea (KOR)	Kang Chae-young	679	2038	4 July 2015	Gwangju, South Korea	2015 Summer Universiade
Universiade record	South Korea (KOR)	Choi Mi-sun	673	2038	4 July 2015	Gwangju, South Korea	2015 Summer Universiade

== Qualification round ==
The ranking round took place on 22 July 2025 to determine the seeding for the elimination rounds. It consisted of three archers' results in individual event, with a maximum score of 2160.

Rank	Team	Archer	Individual			Team		
Rank	Team	Archer	Score	10s	Xs	Total	10s	Xs
1	China	Huang Yuwei	664	31	10	1993	87	29
1	China	Liu Yanxiu	668	30	11	1993	87	29
1	China	Wu Zihan	661	26	8	1993	87	29
2	South Korea	Lee Ga-hyun	645	22	8	1961	74	29
2	South Korea	Nam Su-hyeon	664	27	10	1961	74	29
2	South Korea	Park Eun-seo	652	25	11	1961	74	29
3	Japan	Nanami Asakuno	652	30	11	1958	75	24
3	Japan	Waka Sonoda	657	22	4	1958	75	24
3	Japan	Ruka Uehara	649	23	9	1958	75	24
4	Chinese Taipei	Fong You-jhu	649	26	10	1927	65	27
4	Chinese Taipei	Kuo Tzu-ying	646	22	8	1927	65	27
4	Chinese Taipei	Li Cai-xuan	632	17	9	1927	65	27
5	India	Aditi Jaiswal	637	23	7	1926	62	18
5	India	Bhajan Kaur	642	20	4	1926	62	18
5	India	Basanti Mahato	647	19	7	1926	62	18
6	France	Lisa Barbelin	644	20	5	1924	61	13
6	France	Caroline Lopez	631	16	3	1924	61	13
6	France	Victoria Sebastian	649	25	5	1924	61	13
7	Malaysia	Syaqiera Mashayikh	642	22	5	1899	64	17
7	Malaysia	Alia Mazlan	615	15	3	1899	64	17
7	Malaysia	Ariana Zairi	642	27	9	1899	64	17
8	Germany	Regina Kellerer	614	15	7	1884	59	25
8	Germany	Johanna Klinger	649	26	7	1884	59	25
8	Germany	Clea Reisenweber	621	18	11	1884	59	25
9	Ukraine	Dzvenyslava Chernyk	634	13	3	1882	49	18
9	Ukraine	Iryna Tretiakova	639	18	4	1882	49	18
9	Ukraine	Iryna Yarmak	609	18	11	1882	49	18
10	Slovakia	Denisa Baránková	644	27	9	1866	56	21
10	Slovakia	Elena Bendíková	621	17	7	1866	56	21
10	Slovakia	Kristína Drusková	601	12	5	1866	56	21
11	United States	Eunice Choi	604	13	4	1860	55	20
11	United States	Catalina GNoriega	663	33	14	1860	55	20
11	United States	Grace Lum	593	9	2	1860	55	20
12	Turkey	Defne Derebaşı	596	14	1	1842	48	8
12	Turkey	Fatma Maraşlı	612	15	3	1842	48	8
12	Turkey	Gizem Özkan	634	19	4	1842	48	8
13	Italy	Roberta Di Francesco	631	17	5	1812	40	11
13	Italy	Sara Noceti	568	7	4	1812	40	11
13	Italy	Aiko Rolando	613	16	2	1812	40	11
14	Poland	Karina Kozłowska	626	18	2	1805	39	10
14	Poland	Maria Małolepsza	596	10	4	1805	39	10
14	Poland	Lucja Wesołowska	583	11	4	1805	39	10
15	Uzbekistan	Ziyodakhon Abdusattorova	642	26	7	1795	47	15
15	Uzbekistan	Diana Fatikhova	556	10	4	1795	47	15
15	Uzbekistan	Jasmina Nurmanova	597	11	4	1795	47	15
16	Moldova	Kasandra Berzan	606	14	7	1776	39	11
16	Moldova	Nadejda Celan	569	10	2	1776	39	11
16	Moldova	Nikoli Streapunina	601	15	2	1776	39	11
17	Netherlands	Suzanne de Vries	597	14	6	1746	32	10
17	Netherlands	Ilona Hollander	610	13	4	1746	32	10
17	Netherlands	Yalenka Zeeders	539	5	0	1746	32	10
18	Switzerland	Laura Amato	586	9	0	1736	25	7
18	Switzerland	Alice Bétrisey	584	11	4	1736	25	7
18	Switzerland	Maxine Pichonnaz	566	5	3	1736	25	7

== Elimination round ==
The results are as below.

Round of 32
17	Netherlands	4	50	49	53	51	T.25
16	Moldova	5	49	50	54	49	T.26
15	Uzbekistan	6	55	45	55
18	Switzerland	0	52	43	42

Round of 16
1	China	5	57	55	56
16	Moldova	1	52	50	56
9	Ukraine	2	51	50	53	50
8	Germany	6	55	56	46	51
5	India	6	54	55	56
12	Turkey	0	48	51	54
13	Italy	4	54	51	55	52	T.24
4	Chinese Taipei	5	55	54	52	51	T.27
3	Japan	6	56	57	57
14	Poland	0	50	51	55
11	United States	3	51	56	52	54
6	France	5	56	55	53	54
7	Malaysia	5	55	55	54
10	Slovakia	1	47	52	54
15	Uzbekistan	0	54	51	50
2	South Korea	6	56	56	56

Quarter-finals
1	China	6	57	57	59
8	Germany	0	51	56	55
5	India	1	54	54	55
4	Chinese Taipei	5	54	56	57
3	Japan	6	55	56	56	57
6	France	2	57	55	55	51
7	Malaysia	5	55	56	56
2	South Korea	1	55	55	54

Semi-finals
1	China	3	56	59	58	54
4	Chinese Taipei	5	56	53	56	54
3	Japan	6	55	53	56	57
7	Malaysia	2	54	55	54	54

Gold medal match
4	Chinese Taipei	2	56	54	52	52
3	Japan	6	55	56	58	56
Bronze medal match
1	China	5	48	56	54
7	Malaysia	1	48	40	51
