= Archery at the 2025 Summer World University Games – Women's individual recurve =

Women's individual recurve at the 2025 Summer World University Games
- Venue: Sportpark am Hallo (qualification); Zollverein Coal Mine Industrial Complex (finals)
- Location: Essen, Germany
- Dates: 22 – 26 July 2025
- Competitors: 80 from 39 nations

Medalists
gold medal	Nam Su-hyeon	South Korea
silver medal	Liu Yanxiu	China
bronze medal	Ruka Uehara	Japan

The women's individual recurve archery competition at the 2025 Summer World University Games was held at the Sportpark am Hallo and the Zollverein Coal Mine Industrial Complex in Essen, Germany from 22 to 26 July 2025.

== Records ==
Prior to the competition, the world and Universiade records were as follows.

- 72 arrows ranking round

Category	Athlete	Record	Date	Place	Event
World record	(South Korea) Lim Si-hyeon	694	25 July 2024	Paris, France	2024 Summer Olympics
Universiade record	(South Korea) Choi Mi-sun	687	20 August 2017	Taipei, Taiwan	2017 Summer Universiade

== Qualification round ==
Qualified for Round of 32
Qualified for 1/24 Round

The ranking round took place on 22 July 2025 to determine the seeding for the elimination rounds. It consisted of two rounds of 36 arrows, with a maximum score of 720.

Rank	Archer	70m-1	70m-2	10+X	X	Score
1	Liu Yanxiu (CHN)	331	337	30	11	668
2	Huang Yuwei (CHN)	339	325	31	10	664
3	Nam Su-hyeon (KOR)	326	338	27	10	664
4	Catalina GNoriega (USA)	332	331	33	14	663
5	Wu Zihan (CHN)	332	329	26	8	661
6	Waka Sonoda (JPN)	336	321	22	4	657
7	Nanami Asakuno (JPN)	327	325	30	11	652
8	Park Eun-seo (KOR)	325	327	25	11	652
9	Fong You-jhu (TPE)	327	322	26	10	649
10	Johanna Klinger (GER)	318	331	26	7	649
11	Victoria Sebastian (FRA)	321	328	25	5	649
12	Ruka Uehara (JPN)	322	327	23	9	649
13	Basanti Mahato (IND)	322	325	19	7	647
14	Kuo Tzu-ying (TPE)	321	325	22	8	646
15	Lee Ga-hyun (KOR)	325	320	22	8	645
16	Denisa Baránková (SVK)	326	318	27	9	644
17	Lisa Barbelin (FRA)	311	333	20	5	644
18	Ariana Zairi (MAS)	312	330	27	9	642
19	Ziyodakhon Abdusattorova (UZB)	322	320	26	7	642
20	Syaqiera Mashayikh (MAS)	311	331	22	5	642
21	Bhajan Kaur (IND)	312	330	20	4	642
22	Iryna Tretiakova (UKR)	317	322	18	4	639
23	Žana Pintarič (SLO)	320	319	15	6	639
24	Aditi Jaiswal (IND)	323	314	23	7	637
25	Gizem Özkan (TUR)	316	318	19	4	634
26	Dzvenyslava Chernyk (UKR)	309	325	13	3	634
27	Li Cai-xuan (TPE)	309	323	17	9	632
28	Mădălina Amăistroaie (ROU)	312	319	21	8	631
29	Roberta Di Francesco (ITA)	319	312	17	5	631
30	Caroline Lopez (FRA)	316	315	16	3	631
31	Triinu Lilienthal (EST)	310	318	23	8	628
32	Karina Kozłowska (POL)	308	318	18	2	626
33	Giorgia Cesarini (SMR)	307	318	19	7	625
34	Clea Reisenweber (GER)	308	313	18	11	621
35	Elena Bendíková (SVK)	305	316	17	7	621
36	Megan Costall (GBR)	306	315	13	5	621
37	Mikaella Moshe (ISR)	318	302	17	8	620
38	Fatima Huseynli (AZE)	307	311	12	4	618
39	Emmi Ala-Aho (FIN)	311	304	17	4	615
40	Alia Mazlan (MAS)	304	311	15	3	615
41	Regina Kellerer (GER)	299	315	15	7	614
42	Aiko Rolando (ITA)	301	312	16	2	613
43	Fatma Maraşlı (TUR)	302	310	15	3	612
44	Megan Denier (AUS)	299	312	12	1	611
45	Ilona Hollander (NED)	303	307	13	4	610
46	Iryna Yarmak (UKR)	312	297	18	11	609
47	Kasandra Berzan (MDA)	301	305	14	7	606
48	Eunice Choi (USA)	301	303	13	4	604
49	Nikoli Streapunina (MDA)	299	302	15	2	601
50	Kristína Drušková (SVK)	292	309	12	5	601
51	Poon Yuk Hei (HKG)	296	303	9	5	599
52	Rowanna Hanlon (IRL)	295	303	15	3	598
53	Suzanne de Vries (NED)	298	299	14	6	597
54	Jasmina Nurmanova (UZB)	295	302	11	4	597
55	Defne Derebaşı (TUR)	300	296	14	1	596
56	Maria Małolepsza (POL)	288	308	10	4	596
57	Louisa Piper (GBR)	292	301	14	2	593
58	Grace Lum (USA)	295	298	9	2	593
59	Isabella Matthews (NZL)	296	293	11	2	589
60	Natalee Chan (CAN)	300	289	7	1	589
61	Irene Zapata (ARG)	295	291	9	2	586
62	Laura Amato (SUI)	294	292	9	0	586
63	Amelia Gagné (CAN)	296	288	13	3	584
64	Kintija Trinkūna (LAT)	287	297	13	2	584
65	Alice Bétrisey (SUI)	295	289	11	4	584
66	Łucja Wesołowska (POL)	290	293	11	4	583
67	Veslemøy Gjelsvik (NOR)	287	292	8	4	579
68	Freya Andersson (SWE)	288	290	9	0	578
69	Ella Vanlangenakker (BEL)	294	283	11	4	577
70	Nadejda Celan (MDA)	286	283	10	2	569
71	Sara Noceti (ITA)	288	280	7	4	568
72	Karoli Luige (EST)	283	284	12	3	567
73	Maxine Pichonnaz (SUI)	291	275	5	3	566
74	Natalie Soo (SGP)	286	278	6	2	564
75	Diana Fatikhova (UZB)	270	286	10	4	556
76	Isabel Tang (SGP)	278	276	9	1	554
77	Keturah Gonzales (PHI)	266	279	6	2	545
78	Yalenka Zeeders (NED)	263	276	5	0	539
79	Seema Saleha (PAK)	163	187	1	0	350
80	Abid Sadia (PAK)	114	146	4	0	260

== Elimination round ==
The results are as below.

=== Section 1 ===
1/48 elimination round
33	G Cesarini (SMR)	6	25	26	24
80	A Sadia (PAK)	0	3	2	0
65	A Bétrisey (SUI)	1	22	24	23	27
48	E Choi (USA)	7	27	24	25	29
49	N Streapunina (MDA)	6	28	25	27
64	K Trinkūna (LAT)	0	17	22	26

1/24 elimination round
33	G Cesarini (SMR)	6	23	24	28	26
32	K Kozłowska (POL)	2	25	20	24	25
17	L Barbelin (FRA)	6	25	29	28
48	E Choi (USA)	0	22	27	23
49	N Streapunina (MDA)	2	18	27	24	22
16	D Baránková (SVK)	6	26	25	28	30

1/16 elimination round
1	Liu YX (CHN)	7	28	24	26	30
33	G Cesarini (SMR)	1	26	24	25	25
17	L Barbelin (FRA)	6	29	26	26
16	D Baránková (SVK)	0	25	25	23

1/8 elimination round
1	Liu YX (CHN)	6	26	28	24	26	29
17	L Barbelin (FRA)	4	25	27	28	28	28

=== Section 2 ===
1/48 elimination round
57	L Piper (GBR)	2	22	24	26	25
56	M Małolepsza (POL)	6	24	28	25	28
41	R Kellerer (GER)	6	28	29	24	26
72	K Luige (EST)	2	23	24	26	17
73	M Pichonnaz (SUI)	4	22	27	21	20	24
40	A Mazlan (MAS)	6	27	24	18	28	27

1/24 elimination round
9	Fong Y-j (TPE)	6	27	28	27
56	M Małolepsza (POL)	0	26	26	25
41	R Kellerer (GER)	6	25	26	27	28	27
24	A Jaiswal (IND)	4	28	23	27	25	27
25	G Özkan (TUR)	6	27	26	28	27	26^{9}
40	A Mazlan (MAS)	5	26	27	27	27	30^{8}

1/16 elimination round
9	Fong Y-j (TPE)	6	27	28	29	25	28
41	R Kellerer (GER)	4	25	27	27	24	27
25	G Özkan (TUR)	6	27	25	21	28	26
8	Park E-s (KOR)	4	27	23	28	26	26

1/8 elimination round
9	Fong Y-j (TPE)	6	27	28	29	25	28
25	G Özkan (TUR)	4	27	28	28	27	26

=== Section 3 ===
1/48 elimination round
37	M Moshe (ISR)	6	28	29	26
76	Isabel T (SGP)	0	22	23	19
69	E Vanlangenakker (BEL)	4	21	28	27	23	17
44	M Denier (AUS)	6	28	21	22	24	23
53	S de Vries (NED)	6	25	27	23	20	25
60	N Chan (CAN)	4	25	26	22	24	25

1/24 elimination round
37	M Moshe (ISR)	4	25	25	26	23	28
28	M. Amăistroaie (ROU)	6	24	25	27	28	28
21	B Kaur (IND)	3	27	26	30	25	25
44	M Denier (AUS)	7	27	28	28	26	27
53	S de Vries (NED)	0	24	26	25
12	R Uehara (JPN)	6	30	28	26

1/16 elimination round
5	Wu ZH (CHN)	6	27	29	28	28
28	M. Amăistroaie (ROU)	2	28	26	24	23
44	M Denier (AUS)	0	21	21	22
12	R Uehara (JPN)	6	29	29	27

1/8 elimination round
5	Wu ZH (CHN)	4	28	28	28	28	26
12	R Uehara (JPN)	6	29	29	27	27	27

=== Section 4 ===
1/48 elimination round
61	I Zapata (ARG)	7	23	24	27	27	26
52	R Hanlon (IRL)	3	25	24	25	24	22
45	I Hollander (NED)	6	26	27	25	25
68	F Andersson (SWE)	2	24	24	28	23
77	K Gonzales (PHI)	6	24	24	16	25	24^{8+}
36	M Costall (GBR)	5	22	26	28	25	22'^{8}

1/24 elimination round
13	B Mahato (IND)	6	27	27	28
61	I Zapata (ARG)	0	18	20	22
45	I Hollander (NED)	0	26	24	24
20	S Mashayikh (MAS)	6	29	29	25
29	R Di Francesco (ITA)	6	24	28	27
77	K Gonzales (PHI)	0	19	22	23

1/16 elimination round
13	B Mahato (IND)	6	27	25	28	24	29
20	S Mashayikh (MAS)	4	25	28	25	25	27
29	R Di Francesco (ITA)	2	29	26	28	27
4	C GNoriega (USA)	6	24	28	29	29

1/8 elimination round
13	B Mahato (IND)	6	28	24	26	26
4	C GNoriega (USA)	2	26	28	18	25

=== Section 5 ===
1/48 elimination round
35	E Bendíková (SVK)	6	27	25	28
78	Y Zeeders (NED)	0	25	22	24
67	V Gjelsvik (NOR)	1	27	19	16	18
46	I Yarmak (UKR)	7	27	25	26	26
51	Poon YH (HKG)	6	26	28	26	28
62	L Amato (SUI)	2	26	28	25	25

1/24 elimination round
35	E Bendíková (SVK)	4	27	25	28	26	26
30	C Lopez (FRA)	6	28	28	26	25	28
19	Z Abdusattorova (UZB)	6	28	28	28
46	I Yarmak (UKR)	0	25	26	26
51	Poon YH (HKG)	4	27	27	27	23	24
14	Kuo T-y (TPE)	6	29	26	26	26	27

1/16 elimination round
3	Nam S-h (KOR)	6	28	25	28	26
30	C Lopez (FRA)	2	27	28	27	25
19	Z Abdusattorova (UZB)	0	25	25	25
14	Kuo T-y (TPE)	6	26	30	28

1/8 elimination round
3	Nam S-h (KOR)	6	29	28	29	29
14	Kuo T-y (TPE)	2	27	28	28	29

=== Section 6 ===
1/48 elimination round
59	I Matthews (NZL)	4	26	25	28	24	23
54	J Nurmanova (UZB)	6	25	25	28	25	24
43	F Maraşlı (TUR)	7	23	26	27	29
70	N Celan (MDA)	1	22	21	27	26
75	D Fatikhova (UZB)	6	27	25	26	27	27^{8+}
38	F Huseynli (AZE)	5	27	27	24	28	26^{8}

1/24 elimination round
11	V Sebastian (FRA)	6	28	28	25
54	J Nurmanova (UZB)	0	25	27	24
43	F Maraşlı (TUR)	6	27	26	27
22	I Tretiakova (UKR)	0	25	24	23
27	Li C-x (TPE)	6	27	28	24	28	25
75	D Fatikhova (UZB)	4	25	29	25	23	17

1/16 elimination round
11	V Sebastian (FRA)	6	28	24	28	25	28^{10}
43	F Maraşlı (TUR)	5	28	25	25	25	28^{5}
27	Li C-x (TPE)	6	25	28	27	26
6	W Sonoda (JPN)	2	26	27	25	24

1/8 elimination round
11	V Sebastian (FRA)	7	28	27	28	27	27
27	Li C-x (TPE)	3	27	27	26	28	26

=== Section 7 ===
1/48 elimination round
39	E Ala-Aho (FIN)	6	23	28	23	28	27
74	N Soo (SGP)	4	25	23	24	23	25
71	S Noceti (ITA)	1	26	20	26	21
42	A Rolando (ITA)	7	27	28	26	25
55	D Derebaşı (TUR)	6	22	27	25	21	26
58	G Lum (USA)	4	19	25	27	25	25

1/24 elimination round
39	E Ala-Aho (FIN)	2	26	28	26	24
26	D Chernyk (UKR)	6	27	26	28	29
23	Ž Pintarič (SLO)	6	28	27	29
42	A Rolando (ITA)	0	27	23	28
55	D Derebaşı (TUR)	5	24	27	28	28	25^{9}
10	J Klinger (GER)	6	26	27	25	26	27^{10}

1/16 elimination round
7	N Asakuno (JPN)	6	27	23	26	29	28
26	D Chernyk (UKR)	4	28	27	25	25	24
23	Ž Pintarič (SLO)	5	30	25	24	28	28^{8}
10	J Klinger (GER)	6	26	27	25	26	28^{9}

1/8 elimination round
7	N Asakuno (JPN)	6	28	22	28	28	29^{10}
10	J Klinger (GER)	5	29	25	27	27	29^{9}

=== Section 8 ===
1/48 elimination round
63	A Gagne (CAN)	2	26	15	22	22
50	K Drušková (SVK)	6	25	25	24	26
47	K Berzan (MDA)	4	25	27	27	24	27
66	Ł Wesołowska (POL)	6	27	26	27	25	27
79	S Saleha (PAK)	0	13	14	12
34	C Reisenweber (GER)	6	23	25	25

1/24 elimination round
15	Lee G-h (KOR)	6	26	28	28
50	K Drušková (SVK)	0	24	25	23
66	Ł Wesołowska (POL)	2	28	23	26	27
18	A Zairi (MAS)	6	28	28	28	27
31	T Lilienthal (EST)	0	25	23	26
34	C Reisenweber (GER)	6	26	27	27

1/16 elimination round
15	Lee G-h (KOR)	6	25	27	28	28
18	A Zairi (MAS)	2	28	23	24	27
34	C Reisenweber (GER)	0	23	23	21
2	Huang YW (CHN)	6	26	27	26

1/8 elimination round
15	Lee G-h (KOR)	6	29	30	29
2	Huang YW (CHN)	0	26	29	26

=== Finals ===
Quarterfinals
1	Liu YX (CHN)	6	28	28	29
9	Fong Y-j (TPE)	0	27	27	28
12	R Uehara (JPN)	7	29	27	29	29
13	B Mahato (IND)	1	26	27	27	27
3	Nam S-h (KOR)	6	27	28	30	28
11	V Sebastian (FRA)	2	27	28	25	27
7	N Asakuno (JPN)	0	26	28	26
15	Lee G-h (KOR)	6	29	29	29

Semifinals
1	Liu YX (CHN)	6	27	27	28	27	28^{10}
12	R Uehara (JPN)	5	28	28	25	27	26^{8}
3	Nam S-h (KOR)	7	27	29	28	27	30
15	Lee G-h (KOR)	3	28	27	27	27	29

Finals
1	Liu YX (CHN)	3	27	24	30	28	26
3	Nam S-h (KOR)	7	28	29	30	26	27
Bronze medal match
12	R Uehara (JPN)	6	29	27	29	29
15	Lee G-h (KOR)	2	28	28	28	28
