= 2022 Archery World Cup =

International archery competition

- Sport: Archery
- Duration: 18 April – 16 October

World Cup Final
- Recurve Men: (gold) (South Korea) Kim Woo-jin; (silver) (Spain) Miguel Alvariño; (bronze) (Turkey) Mete Gazoz
- Recurve Women: (gold) (South Korea) An San; (silver) (South Korea) Choi Mi-sun; (bronze) (Chinese Taipei) Peng Chia-mao
- Compound Men: (gold) (Netherlands) Mike Schloesser; (silver) (France) Nicolas Girard; (bronze) (Puerto Rico) Jean Pizarro
- Compound Women: (gold) (Colombia) Sara López; (silver) (United Kingdom) Ella Gibson; (bronze) (Colombia) Alejandra Usquiano

Seasons
- ← 2021 2023 →

The 2022 Archery World Cup, also known as the Hyundai Archery World Cup for sponsorship reasons, was the 16th edition of the international archery circuit organised annually by World Archery. The 2022 World Cup consisted of five events, and ran from 19 April to 24 July 2022 so far.

== Calendar ==
The calendar for the 2022 World Cup, announced by World Archery.

Stage	Date	Location	Ref.
1	18–24 April	Antalya, Turkey	
2	16–22 May	Gwangju, South Korea	
3	20–26 June	Paris, France	
4	18–24 July	Medellín, Colombia	
Final	15–16 October	Tlaxcala, Mexico	

== Results ==
=== Recurve ===
==== Men's individual ====
Stage	Venue	1st place, gold medalist(s)	2nd place, silver medalist(s)	3rd place, bronze medalist(s)
1	(Turkey) Antalya	(Spain) Miguel Alvariño	(Australia) Ryan Tyack	(United States) Brady Ellison
2	(South Korea) Gwangju	(South Korea) Kim Woo-jin	(South Korea) Lee Woo-seok	(Spain) Miguel Alvariño
3	(France) Paris	(Brazil) Marcus D'Almeida	(South Korea) Kim Je-deok	(South Korea) Oh Jin-hyek
4	(Colombia) Medellín	(South Korea) Kim Woo-jin	(Italy) Mauro Nespoli	(Spain) Miguel Alvariño
Final	(Mexico) Tlaxcala	(South Korea) Kim Woo-jin	(Spain) Miguel Alvariño	(Turkey) Mete Gazoz

==== Women's individual ====
Stage	Venue	1st place, gold medalist(s)	2nd place, silver medalist(s)	3rd place, bronze medalist(s)
1	(Turkey) Antalya	(United Kingdom) Bryony Pitman	(Netherlands) Laura van der Winkel	(Germany) Katharina Bauer
2	(South Korea) Gwangju	(South Korea) Choi Mi-sun	(South Korea) Lee Ga-hyun	(Chinese Taipei) Chiu Yi-ching
3	(France) Paris	(Japan) Utano Agu	(Chinese Taipei) Peng Chia-mao	(South Korea) Choi Mi-sun
4	(Colombia) Medellín	(South Korea) An San	(South Korea) Lee Ga-hyun	(South Korea) Kang Chae-young
Final	(Mexico) Tlaxcala	(South Korea) An San	(South Korea) Choi Mi-sun	(Chinese Taipei) Peng Chia-mao

==== Men's team ====
Stage	Venue	1st place, gold medalist(s)	2nd place, silver medalist(s)	3rd place, bronze medalist(s)
1	(Turkey) Antalya	Chinese Taipei; Su Yu-yang; Tang Chih-chun; Wei Chun-heng	Italy; Mauro Nespoli; Alessandro Paoli; David Pasqualucci	Netherlands; Gijs Broeksma; Rick van der Ven; Steve Wijler
2	(South Korea) Gwangju	South Korea; Kim Je-deok; Kim Woo-jin; Lee Woo-seok	Italy; Mauro Nespoli; Alessandro Paoli; David Pasqualucci	Spain; Pablo Acha; Miguel Alvariño; Daniel Castro
3	(France) Paris	South Korea; Kim Je-deok; Kim Woo-jin; Oh Jin-hyek	United States; Brady Ellison; Matthew Requa; Jack Williams	Turkey; Samet Ak; Mete Gazoz; Muhammed Yıldırmış
4	(Colombia) Medellín	South Korea; Kim Je-deok; Kim Woo-jin; Oh Jin-hyek	Spain; Pablo Acha; Miguel Alvariño; Ken Sánchez	Germany; Florian Unruh; Jonathan Vetter; Felix Wieser

==== Women's team ====
Stage	Venue	1st place, gold medalist(s)	2nd place, silver medalist(s)	3rd place, bronze medalist(s)
1	(Turkey) Antalya	Great Britain; Penny Healey; Bryony Pitman; Jessica Kaur Jaspreet Sagoo	Germany; Katharina Bauer; Michelle Kroppen; Charline Schwarz	Chinese Taipei; Kuo Tzu-ying; Lei Chien-ying; Peng Chia-mao
2	(South Korea) Gwangju	South Korea; An San; Choi Mi-sun; Lee Ga-hyun	Germany; Katharina Bauer; Michelle Kroppen; Charline Schwarz	India; Komalika Bari; Ankita Bhakat; Ridhi
3	(France) Paris	Chinese Taipei; Kuo Tzu-ying; Lei Chien-ying; Peng Chia-mao	India; Ankita Bhakat; Simranjeet Kaur; Deepika Kumari	Germany; Katharina Bauer; Michelle Kroppen; Charline Schwarz
4	(Colombia) Medellín	South Korea; An San; Kang Chae-young; Lee Ga-hyun	Great Britain; Penny Healey; Bryony Pitman; Jessica Kaur Jaspreet Sagoo	France; Lisa Barbelin; Anaëlle Florent; Lauréna Villard

==== Mixed team ====
Stage	Venue	1st place, gold medalist(s)	2nd place, silver medalist(s)	3rd place, bronze medalist(s)
1	(Turkey) Antalya	India; Ridhi Phor; Tarundeep Rai	Great Britain; Bryony Pitman; Alex Wise	United States; Gabrielle Sasai; Brady Ellison
2	(South Korea) Gwangju	Germany; Katharina Bauer; Felix Wieser	United States; Casey Kaufhold; Brady Ellison	Netherlands; Gabriela Schloesser; Rick van der Ven
3	(France) Paris	United States; Casey Kaufhold; Brady Ellison	Spain; Leyre Fernández; Miguel Alvariño	Netherlands; Gabriela Schloesser; Rick van der Ven
4	(Colombia) Medellín	Chinese Taipei; Lei Chien-ying; Tang Chih-chun	United States; Casey Kaufhold; Jack Williams	Brazil; Ana Luiza Sliachticas; Marcus D'Almeida

=== Compound ===
==== Men's individual ====
Stage	Venue	1st place, gold medalist(s)	2nd place, silver medalist(s)	3rd place, bronze medalist(s)
1	(Turkey) Antalya	(Netherlands) Mike Schloesser	(France) Adrien Gontier	(France) Jean-Philippe Boulch
2	(South Korea) Gwangju	(Netherlands) Mike Schloesser	(India) Mohan Ramswaroop Bhardwaj	(United States) Steve Marsh
3	(France) Paris	(France) Nicolas Girard	(Norway) Anders Faugstad	(United States) Braden Gellenthien
4	(Colombia) Medellín	(United States) James Lutz	(Mexico) Miguel Becerra	(Netherlands) Mike Schloesser
Final	(Mexico) Tlaxcala	(Netherlands) Mike Schloesser	(France) Nicolas Girard	(Puerto Rico) Jean Pizarro

==== Women's individual ====
Stage	Venue	1st place, gold medalist(s)	2nd place, silver medalist(s)	3rd place, bronze medalist(s)
1	(Turkey) Antalya	(United Kingdom) Ella Gibson	(Colombia) Alejandra Usquiano	(Estonia) Lisell Jäätma
2	(South Korea) Gwangju	(South Korea) Kim Yun-hee	(Spain) Andrea Muñoz	(Mexico) Dafne Quintero
3	(France) Paris	(United Kingdom) Ella Gibson	(India) Jyothi Surekha Vennam	(France) Sophie Dodemont
4	(Colombia) Medellín	(United Kingdom) Ella Gibson	(Mexico) Dafne Quintero	(Colombia) Sara López
Final	(Mexico) Tlaxcala	(Colombia) Sara López	(United Kingdom) Ella Gibson	(Colombia) Alejandra Usquiano

==== Men's team ====
Stage	Venue	1st place, gold medalist(s)	2nd place, silver medalist(s)	3rd place, bronze medalist(s)
1	(Turkey) Antalya	India; Rajat Chauhan; Aman Saini; Abhishek Verma	France; Quentin Baraër; Jean-Philippe Boulch; Adrien Gontier	Netherlands; Sil Pater; Mike Schloesser; Stef Willems
2	(South Korea) Gwangju	India; Rajat Chauhan; Aman Saini; Abhishek Verma	France; Quentin Baraër; Jean-Philippe Boulch; Adrien Gontier	South Korea; Choi Yong-hee; Kim Jong-ho; Yang Jae-won
3	(France) Paris	France; Quentin Baraër; Jean-Philippe Boulch; Nicolas Girard	Turkey; Batuhan Akçaoğlu; Emircan Haney; Yakup Yıldız	United States; Braden Gellenthien; James Lutz; Kris Schaff
4	(Colombia) Medellín	France; Jean-Philippe Boulch; Nicolas Girard; Adrien Gontier	Colombia; Sebastián Arenas; Pablo Gómez; Daniel Muñoz	United States; Braden Gellenthien; James Lutz; Tate Morgan

==== Women's team ====
Stage	Venue	1st place, gold medalist(s)	2nd place, silver medalist(s)	3rd place, bronze medalist(s)
1	(Turkey) Antalya	Germany; Julia Böhnke; Franziska Göppel; Carolin Landesfeind	Turkey; Yeşim Bostan; Emine Rabia Oğuz; Ayşe Bera Süzer	Estonia; Lisell Jäätma; Meeri-Marita Paas; Maris Tetsmann
2	(South Korea) Gwangju	South Korea; Kim Yun-hee; Oh Yoo-hyun; Song Yun-soo	Estonia; Lisell Jäätma; Meeri-Marita Paas; Maris Tetsmann	India; Priya Gurjar; Avneet Kaur; Muskan Kirar
3	(France) Paris	Turkey; Yeşim Bostan; Songül Lök; Ayşe Bera Süzer	Great Britain; Layla Annison; Elizabeth Foster; Ella Gibson	France; Sophie Dodemont; Lola Grandjean; Sandra Herve
4	(Colombia) Medellín	Colombia; Sara López; María Suárez; Alejandra Usquiano	Great Britain; Isabelle Carpenter; Elizabeth Foster; Ella Gibson	South Korea; Kim Yun-hee; Oh Yoo-hyun; So Chae-won

==== Mixed team ====
Stage	Venue	1st place, gold medalist(s)	2nd place, silver medalist(s)	3rd place, bronze medalist(s)
1	(Turkey) Antalya	Colombia; Sara López; Daniel Muñoz	Slovenia; Toja Ellison; Aljaž Matija Brenk	Croatia; Amanda Mlinarić; Domagoj Buden
2	(South Korea) Gwangju	Chinese Taipei; Huang I-jou; Chen Chieh-lun	Estonia; Lisell Jäätma; Robin Jäätma	India; Avneet Kaur; Abhishek Verma
3	(France) Paris	India; Jyothi Surekha Vennam; Abhishek Verma	France; Sophie Dodemont; Jean-Philippe Boulch	Great Britain; Ella Gibson; Adam Carpenter
4	(Colombia) Medellín	Denmark; Tanja Gellenthien; Mathias Fullerton	United States; Linda Ochoa-Anderson; James Lutz	Mexico; Dafne Quintero; Miguel Becerra

== Medals table ==
Rank	Nation	Gold	Silver	Bronze	Total
1	South Korea	13	5	5	23
2	Great Britain	5	5	1	11
3	India	4	3	3	10
4	Chinese Taipei	4	1	3	8
5	France	3	5	4	12
6	Colombia	3	2	2	7
7	Netherlands	3	1	5	9
8	United States	2	4	6	12
9	Germany	2	2	3	7
10	Spain	1	4	3	8
11	Turkey	1	2	2	5
12	Brazil	1	0	1	2
13	Denmark	1	0	0	1
13	Japan	1	0	0	1
15	Italy	0	3	0	3
16	Estonia	0	2	2	4
16	Mexico	0	2	2	4
18	Australia	0	1	0	1
18	Norway	0	1	0	1
18	Slovenia	0	1	0	1
21	Croatia	0	0	1	1
21	Puerto Rico	0	0	1	1
Totals (22 entries)		44	44	44	132
