= Archery at the 2022 Asian Games – Women's team recurve =

Women's team recurve at the 2022 Asian Games
- Venue: Fuyang Yinhu Sports Centre
- Dates: 1–6 October 2023
- Competitors: 71 from 19 nations

Medalists
gold medal	South Korea; An San, Choi Mi-sun, Lim Si-hyeon
silver medal	China; An Qixuan, Hailigan, Li Jiaman
bronze medal	India; Ankita Bhakat, Bhajan Kaur, Simranjeet Kaur

The women's team recurve archery competition at the 2022 Asian Games was held from 1 to 6 October 2023 at Fuyang Yinhu Sports Centre.

A total of 19 nations participated in the ranking round. Each team consisted of the highest ranked three athletes from the qualification round.

== Schedule ==
All times are China Standard Time (UTC+08:00)

Date	Time	Event
Sunday, 1 October 2023	14:20	Qualification round
Monday, 2 October 2023	11:10	1/8 eliminations
Friday, 6 October 2023	08:40	Quarterfinals
Friday, 6 October 2023	10:20	Semifinals
Friday, 6 October 2023	11:10	Bronze medal match
Friday, 6 October 2023	11:35	Gold medal match

== Results ==
=== Qualification round ===
Rank	Team	Half		Total	10s	Xs
Rank	Team	1st	2nd	Total	10s	Xs
1	South Korea (KOR)	1007	1015	2022	104	36
	An San	338	334	672	33	13
	Choi Mi-sun	335	337	672	33	10
	Kang Chae-young	~~334~~	~~334~~	~~668~~	~~30~~	~~8~~
	Lim Si-hyeon	334	344	678	38	13
2	China (CHN)	992	1013	2005	91	24
	An Qixuan	330	333	663	26	5
	Hailigan	335	341	676	34	12
	Li Jiaman	327	339	666	31	7
	Zhang Mengyao	~~329~~	~~328~~	~~657~~	~~25~~	~~12~~
3	Chinese Taipei (TPE)	950	991	1941	62	18
	Chiu Yi-ching	316	335	651	19	8
	Kuo Tzu-ying	~~316~~	~~321~~	~~637~~	~~21~~	~~6~~
	Lei Chien-ying	325	328	653	21	6
	Peng Chia-mao	309	328	637	22	4
4	Japan (JPN)	953	983	1936	64	19
	Satsuki Noda	321	335	656	27	9
	Tomomi Sugimoto	321	332	653	23	6
	Azusa Yamauchi	311	316	627	14	4
5	India (IND)	941	988	1929	72	19
	Ankita Bhakat	316	333	649	26	9
	Bhajan Kaur	311	329	640	24	6
	Simranjeet Kaur	314	326	640	22	4
	Prachi Singh	~~292~~	~~301~~	~~593~~	~~10~~	~~5~~
6	Vietnam (VIE)	944	979	1923	63	21
	Đỗ Thị Ánh Nguyệt	319	328	647	17	10
	Hoàng Phương Thảo	316	319	635	22	5
	Hoàng Thị Mai	~~309~~	~~324~~	~~633~~	~~19~~	~~8~~
	Nguyễn Thị Thanh Nhi	309	332	641	24	6
7	Kazakhstan (KAZ)	941	961	1902	59	17
	Gaukhar Igibayeva	~~304~~	~~316~~	~~620~~	~~16~~	~~4~~
	Alina Ilyassova	309	322	631	22	5
	Alua Mukhtarkhanova	308	318	626	18	6
	Medina Murat	324	321	645	19	6
8	Malaysia (MAS)	910	955	1865	57	15
	Ku Nurin Afiqah	311	315	626	20	6
	Nur Ain Ayuni Fozi	~~288~~	~~297~~	~~585~~	~~9~~	~~3~~
	Syaqiera Mashayikh	303	336	639	27	4
	Nurul Izzah Mazlan	296	304	600	10	5
9	Indonesia (INA)	907	951	1858	50	7
	Diananda Choirunisa	325	331	656	23	2
	Rezza Octavia	308	313	621	19	4
	Anindya Nayla Putri	274	307	581	8	1
	Catharine Thea Darma	~~237~~	~~245~~	~~482~~	~~5~~	~~1~~
10	Iran (IRI)	923	928	1851	47	15
	Mobina Fallah	309	309	618	13	6
	Zahra Nemati	305	311	616	18	2
	Yasna Pourmahani	309	308	617	16	7
11	North Korea (PRK)	902	936	1838	42	16
	Kang Un-ju	300	319	619	14	5
	Pak Hyang-sun	314	309	623	17	6
	Ri Song-bok	288	308	596	11	5
12	Thailand (THA)	906	929	1835	38	13
	Sataporn Artsalee	314	301	615	14	5
	Punika Jongkraijak	293	316	609	15	6
	Chunyaphak Kanjana	~~250~~	~~259~~	~~509~~	~~9~~	~~3~~
	Narisara Khunhiranchaiyo	299	312	611	9	2
13	Mongolia (MGL)	921	912	1833	41	13
	Jargalsaikhany Dagiijanchiv	301	301	602	12	1
	Altangereliin Enkhtuyaa	310	306	616	14	6
	Ölziikhutagiin Khaliun	310	305	615	15	6
	Bishindeegiin Urantungalag	~~300~~	~~296~~	~~596~~	~~10~~	~~4~~
14	Bangladesh (BAN)	898	927	1825	39	17
	Famida Sultana Nisha	275	287	562	9	3
	Beauty Ray	~~272~~	~~289~~	~~561~~	~~9~~	~~2~~
	Sima Aktar Shimu	310	321	631	12	5
	Diya Siddique	313	319	632	18	9
15	Hong Kong (HKG)	899	909	1808	38	11
	Cheng Yik Kiu	298	305	603	13	5
	Ada Lam	~~292~~	~~291~~	~~583~~	~~11~~	~~5~~
	Natalie Poon	314	301	615	15	5
	Wang Cheuk Ying	287	303	590	10	1
16	Uzbekistan (UZB)	888	914	1802	48	12
	Ziyodakhon Abdusattorova	308	324	632	22	5
	Nilufar Hamroeva	309	319	628	20	6
	Sabina Jurakulova	271	271	542	6	1
	Bibihojar Yuldosheva	~~269~~	~~266~~	~~535~~	~~5~~	~~3~~
17	Saudi Arabia (KSA)	831	799	1630	27	5
	Shaden Al-Marshud	279	280	559	14	2
	Dalal Al-Mugairin	269	242	511	5	1
	Aya Felemban	~~229~~	~~250~~	~~479~~	~~4~~	~~3~~
	Sarah Saloum	283	277	560	8	2
18	Kuwait (KUW)	803	799	1602	21	4
	Soad Al-Bahar	278	253	531	7	3
	Reem Al-Naqeeb	286	296	582	10	1
	Noor Al-Sharhan	239	250	489	4	0
19	Yemen (YEM)	440	500	940	6	2
	Atheer Al-Husaini	143	181	324	1	0
	Hend Hamoud	148	181	329	4	2
	Ebtisam Majrad	149	138	287	1	0

=== Knockout round ===
1/8 eliminations
1	South Korea	58	59	59	6
16	Uzbekistan	47	52	54	0
9	Indonesia	50	56	56	52	6
8	Malaysia	51	53	51	51	2
5	India	49	54	55	5
12	Thailand	47	54	54	1
13	Mongolia	48	53	47	0
4	Japan	52	54	54	6
3	Chinese Taipei	58	57	57	5
14	Bangladesh	55	51	57	1
11	North Korea	46	50	57	49	2
6	Vietnam	53	51	55	55	6
7	Kazakhstan	53	52	52	51	3
10	Iran	53	55	49	53	5
15	Hong Kong	56	51	47	1
2	China	56	56	58	5

Quarterfinals
1	South Korea	54	57	55	6
9	Indonesia	50	49	51	0
5	India	53	56	53	54	6
4	Japan	49	54	54	51	2
3	Chinese Taipei	51	52	55	54	28	4
6	Vietnam	56	50	55	54	28+	5
10	Iran	48	54	49	52	2
2	China	51	50	58	55	6

Semifinals
1	South Korea	56	57	55	57	6
5	India	54	54	57	52	2
6	Vietnam	56	51	55	54	2
2	China	55	58	57	57	6

Gold medal match
1	South Korea	58	55	55	57	5
2	China	58	53	56	54	3
Bronze medal match
5	India	56	55	57	51	6
6	Vietnam	52	56	50	48	2
