= Archery at the 2023 Pan American Games – Women's individual recurve =

Women's individual recurve at the 2023 Pan American Games
- Venue: Archery Center
- Dates: November 1 – November 5
- Competitors: 33 from 16 nations

Medalists
Gold medal	Alejandra Valencia	Mexico
Silver medal	Ana Clara Machado	Brazil
Bronze medal	Casey Kaufhold	United States

The women's individual recurve competition of the archery events at the 2023 Pan American Games was held from November 1 to 5 at the Archery Center in Santiago, Chile.

== Schedule ==
Date	Time	Round
November 1, 2023	09:00	Ranking Round
November 2, 2023	11:00	Round of 32
November 2, 2023	11:35	Round of 16
November 3, 2023	11:00	Quarterfinals
November 5, 2023	09:38	Semifinals
November 5, 2023	10:34	Final

== Results ==
=== Ranking round ===
The results were as follows:

Rank	Archer	Nation	Score	Note
1	Alejandra Valencia	Mexico	674	
2	Casey Kaufhold	United States	674	
3	Angela Ruiz	Mexico	665	
4	Florencia Leithold	Argentina	655	
5	Ana Rendón	Colombia	653	
6	Ana Clara Machado	Brazil	647	
7	Virginie Chénier	Canada	645	
8	Jennifer Mucino-Fernandez	United States	644	
9	Maira Sepúlveda	Colombia	637	
10	Javiera Andrades	Chile	636	
11	Sarah Nikitin	Brazil	635	
12	Valentina Vazquez	Mexico	633	
13	Catalina GNoriega	United States	630	
14	Stephanie Barrett	Canada	623	
15	Ane Marcelle dos Santos	Brazil	623	
16	Carolina Posada	Colombia	616	
17	Nieves Arango	Venezuela	615	
18	Daniela Chacón	Venezuela	610	
19	Adriana Espinoza	Ecuador	604	
20	Nilka Cotto	Puerto Rico	603	
21	Anne Abernathy	Virgin Islands	596	
22	Ariadna Esquella	Chile	592	
23	Larissa Pagan	Cuba	590	
24	Santa Ortiz	Dominican Republic	589	
25	Nancy Enríquez	Independent Athletes Team	583	
26	Yailin Paredes	Cuba	583	
27	Amelia Gagne	Canada	582	
28	Alexandra Zavala	Peru	577	
29	Matilde Baeza	Chile	576	
30	Maydenia Sarduy	Cuba	548	
31	Marcela Cortez	El Salvador	446	
32	Lisbeth Leoni	Venezuela	409	

=== Competition rounds ===
The results during the elimination rounds and final rounds were as follows:

==== Finals ====
Semifinals
1	A Valencia (MEX)	2	1	2	2
5	A Rendón (COL)	0	1	0	0
6	A Machado (BRA)	0	2	1	2	1
2	C Kaufhold (USA)	2	0	1	0	1

Finals
1	A Valencia (MEX)	2	2	1	2
6	A Machado (BRA)	0	0	1	0
Third place
5	A Rendón (COL)	0	0	0
2	C Kaufhold (USA)	2	2	2

==== Top half ====
Round of 32
1	A Valencia (MEX)	2	2	2
32	L Leoni (VEN)	0	0	0
17	N Arango (VEN)	0	0	2	2	0
16	C Posada (COL)	2	2	0	0	2
9	M Sepúlveda (COL)	2	2	2
24	S Ortiz (DOM)	0	0	0
25	N Enríquez (EAI)	0	0	0
8	J Mucino (USA)	2	2	2
5	A Rendón (COL)	2	2	2
28	A Zavala (PER)	0	0	0
21	A Abernathy (ISV)	0	0	0
12	V Vazquez (MEX)	2	2	2	0	0	0
13	C GNoriega (USA)	2	2	2
20	N Cotto (PUR)	0	0	0
29	M Baeza (CHI)	0	2	0	2	2
4	F Leithhold (ARG)	2	0	2	0	0

Round of 16
1	A Valencia (MEX)	2	2	2
16	C Posada (COL)	0	0	0
9	M Sepúlveda (COL)	0	0	0
8	J Mucino (USA)	2	2	2
5	A Rendón (COL)	1	1	2	2
12	V Vazquez (MEX)	1	1	0	0
13	C GNoriega (USA)	2	2	2
29	M Baeza (CHI)	0	0	0

Quarterfinals
1	A Valencia (MEX)	2	0	1	2	2
8	J Mucino (USA)	0	2	1	0	0
5	A Rendón (COL)	2	2	0	2
13	C GNoriega (USA)	0	0	2	0

Semifinals
1	A Valencia (MEX)	2	1	2	2
5	A Rendón (COL)	0	1	0	0

==== Bottom half ====
Round of 32
3	Angela Ruiz (MEX)	2	2	2
30	M Sarduy (CUB)	0	0	0
19	A Espinoza (ECU)	2	1	0	0	2	0
14	S Barrett (CAN)	0	1	2	2	0	1
11	S Nikitin (BRA)	0	2	2	2
22	A Esquella (CHI)	2	0	0	0
27	A Gagne (CAN)	0	0	0
6	A Machado (BRA)	2	2	2
7	V Chénier (CAN)	1	2	2	2
26	Y Paredes (CUB)	1	0	0	0
23	L Pagan (CUB)	0	0	0
10	J Andrades (CHI)	2	2	2
15	A Dos Santos (BRA)	2	0	2	0	0
18	D Chacón (VEN)	0	2	0	2	2
31	M Cortez (ESA)	0	0	0
2	C Kaufhold (USA)	2	2	2

Round of 16
3	A Ruiz (MEX)	0	2	2	2
14	S Barrett (CAN)	2	0	0	0
11	S Nikitin (BRA)	0	0	2	2	0
6	A Machado (BRA)	2	2	0	0	2
7	V Chénier (CAN)	1	0	2	2	0	1
10	J Andrades (CHI)	1	2	0	0	2	0
18	D Chacón (VEN)	2	0	0	2	0
2	C Kaufhold (USA)	0	2	2	0	2

Quarterfinals
3	A Ruiz (MEX)	0	2	0	2	0
6	A Machado (BRA)	2	0	2	0	2
7	V Chénier (CAN)	0	2	0	0
2	C Kaufhold (USA)	2	0	2	2

Semifinals
6	A Machado (BRA)	0	2	1	2	1
2	C Kaufhold (USA)	2	0	1	0	1
