= Archery at the 2026 Asian Games – Women's team recurve =

Archery – Women's team recurve at the Games of the Olympiad
- Venue: Okazaki Central Park Multipurpose Square
- Dates: 26 September – 2 October 2026
- Competitors: TBC from TBC nations

Medalists
1st place, gold medalist(s)		India (IND); Ankita Bhakat (IND); Kirti Sharma (IND); Kumkum Mohod (IND)
2nd place, silver medalist(s)		South Korea (KOR); Kang Chae-young (KOR); Lee Yun-ji (KOR); Oh Ye-jin (KOR)
3rd place, bronze medalist(s)		China (CHN); Huang Yuwei (CHN); Yu Qi (CHN); Zhu Jingyi (CHN)

The women's team recurve archery competition at the 2026 Asian Games was held from 26 September to 2 October 2026 at the Okazaki Central Park Multipurpose Square in Okazaki, Aichi Prefecture, Japan.

India won their first Asian Games gold medal in the event, defeating defending champions South Korea 5–3 in the final and ending Korea's run of seven consecutive titles. China won the bronze medal.

A total of TBC nations participated in the ranking round. Each team consisted of the highest ranked three athletes from the qualification round.

== Schedule ==
All times are Japan Standard Time (UTC+09:00)

Date	Time	Event
Saturday, 26 September 2026	09:00	Qualification round
Sunday, 27 September 2026	TBC	1/8 eliminations
Sunday, 27 September 2026	TBC	Quarterfinals
Friday, 2 October 2026	09:00	Semifinals
Friday, 2 October 2026	TBC	Bronze medal match
Friday, 2 October 2026	TBC	Gold medal match

== Results ==
=== Qualification round ===
Rank	Team	Half		Total	10s	Xs
Rank	Team	1st	2nd	Total	10s	Xs
1	South Korea (KOR)	1013	1027	2040	72	37
	Kang Chae-young	337	348	685	26	14
	Oh Ye-jin	337	341	678	25	8
	Lee Yun-ji	339	338	677	21	15
2	China (CHN)	993	999	1992	65	24
	Zhu Jingyi	336	338	674	25	11
	Huang Yuwei	333	331	664	23	8
	Yu Qi	324	330	654	17	5
3	Chinese Taipei (TPE)	998	992	1990	62	30
	Li Tsai-chi	335	334	669	26	8
	Hsu Hsin-tzu	335	333	668	22	13
	Fong You-jhu	328	325	653	14	9
4	Japan (JPN)	990	993	1983	60	24
	Nanami Asakuno	334	344	678	27	12
	Fuko Ohta	331	323	654	15	7
	Waka Sonoda	325	326	651	18	5
5	Indonesia (INA)	995	982	1977	65	19
	Diananda Choirunisa	335	326	661	20	8
	Rezza Octavia	329	332	661	25	5
	Fathiyya Erista Maharani	331	324	655	20	6
6	India (IND)	971	991	1962	45	27
	Kumkum Mohod	329	337	666	17	8
	Kirti Sharma	324	329	653	13	8
	Ankita Bhakat	318	325	643	15	11
7	Vietnam (VIE)	977	957	1934	43	21
	Loc Thi Dao	338	330	668	18	12
	Hoang Phuong Thao	331	322	653	18	6
	Trieu Huyen Diep	308	305	613	7	3
8	Philippines (PHI)	966	967	1933	49	17
	Naina Dominique Tagle	332	334	666	21	8
	Gabrielle Monica Bidaure	319	320	639	16	4
	Giuliana Vernice Garcia	315	313	628	12	5
9	Kazakhstan (KAZ)	945	977	1922	30	24
	Samira Zhumagulova	321	325	646	14	3
	Alexandra Zemlyanova	310	332	642	10	12
	Medina Murat	314	320	634	6	9
10	Uzbekistan (UZB)	963	958	1921	44	18
	Nilufar Hamroeva	336	326	662	22	9
	Ziyodakhon Abdusattorova	314	321	635	11	5
	Malika Anvarjonova	313	311	624	11	4
11	Mongolia (MGL)	956	962	1918	45	21
	Baasandorj Oyun-Erdene	333	328	661	25	9
	Bishindeegiin Urantungalag	316	318	634	8	8
	Orgil Enkhsaruul	307	316	623	12	4
12	Malaysia (MAS)	909	959	1868	36	13
	Ariana nur Dania Mohamad Zairi	316	327	641	15	7
	Joey Xing Lei Tan	301	318	619	12	3
	Ku Nurin Afiqah Ku Ruzaini	292	314	606	9	3
13	Bangladesh (BAN)	914	943	1857	30	9
	Saima Salah Uddin	312	322	634	11	3
	Sima Aktar Shimu	304	314	618	9	3
	Mst Monira Akter	298	307	605	10	3
14	United Arab Emirates (UAE)	881	882	1763	26	9
	Aisha Alali	315	309	624	13	5
	Hessa Alawadhi	294	306	600	9	3
	Huda Alali	272	267	539	4	1
15	Kyrgyzstan (KGZ)	773	769	1542	15	8
	Dinar Aibekovna Bekablieva	315	300	615	10	4
	Eliza Tynalieva	229	259	488	2	4
	Asel Sharbekova	229	210	439	3	0

=== Knockout round ===
1/8 elimination round
9	Kazakhstan (KAZ)	5	54	50	54	53	29
8	Philippines (PHI)	4	46	52	53	57	28
5	Indonesia (INA)	6	55	53	57	54
12	Malaysia (MAS)	2	52	54	55	51
13	Bangladesh (BAN)	5	52	53	55	49	26
4	Japan (JPN)	4	55	52	53	52	24
3	Chinese Taipei (TPE)	6	54	55	57
14	United Arab Emirates (UAE)	0	49	47	53
11	Mongolia (MGL)	0	57	54	53
6	India (IND)	6	59	56	54
7	Vietnam (VIE)	6	54	56	54
10	Uzbekistan (UZB)	0	45	51	53
15	Kyrgyzstan (KGZ)	0	42	51	37
2	China (CHN)	6	55	55	54

Quarter-finals
1	South Korea (KOR)	5	57	53	56	56
9	Kazakhstan (KAZ)	3	47	54	55	56
5	Indonesia (INA)	5	54	51	52	53
13	Bangladesh (BAN)	3	52	51	54	50
3	Chinese Taipei (TPE)	0	48	51	52
6	India (IND)	6	54	53	54
7	Vietnam (VIE)	4	49	52	53	54	28
2	China (CHN)	5	55	55	51	50	29

Semi-finals
1	South Korea (KOR)	6	53	54	57
5	Indonesia (INA)	0	49	52	55
6	India (IND)	5	53	54	51
2	China (CHN)	1	51	52	51

Gold medal match
1	South Korea (KOR)	3	54	56	51	54
6	India (IND)	5	54	56	55	54
Bronze medal match
5	Indonesia (INA)	2	53	57	51	56
2	China (CHN)	6	55	55	55	58
