= Zhu Jingyi =

Zhu Jingyi may refer to:

- Cyrus Chu, Taiwanese economist
- Zhu Jingyi (archer), Chinese archer
