= An San =

South Korean archer (born 2001)

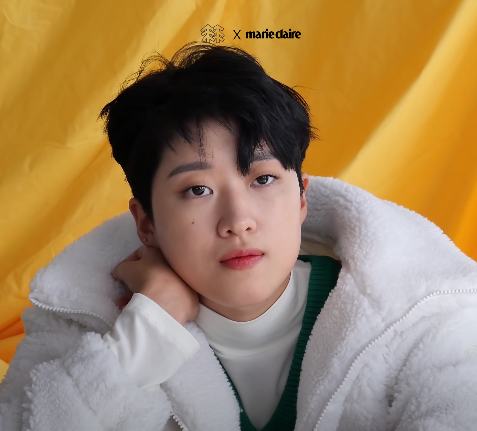
- An in 2021

Personal information
- Native name: 안산
- National team: South Korea
- Citizenship: South Korean
- Born: 27 February 2001 (age 25) Gwangju, South Korea
- Education: Gwangju Women's University
- Height: 1.75 m (5 ft 9 in)

Sport
- Country: South Korea
- Sport: Archery
- Rank: 3 (as of 03 March 2026)
- Event: Recurve
- University team: Gwangju Women's University
- Club: Gwangju Bank
- Coached by: Kim Sung-eun

Achievements and titles
- Highest world ranking: 1 (as of 27 September 2021)
Medal record
Women's recurve archery
Representing South Korea
Event	1st	2nd	3rd
Olympic Games	3	0	0
World Championships	2	1	3
Archery World Cup	10	1	3
Asian Games	1	1	0
Total	16	3	6
Event	1st	2nd	3rd
Women's individual	5	2	3
Women's team	11	0	3
Mixed team	3	1	0
Olympic Games
Gold medal – first place	2020 Tokyo	Individual
Gold medal – first place	2020 Tokyo	Team
Gold medal – first place	2020 Tokyo	Mixed team
World Championships
Gold medal – first place	2021 Yankton	Team
Gold medal – first place	2021 Yankton	Mixed team
Silver medal – second place	2025 Gwangju	Mixed team
Bronze medal – third place	2021 Yankton	Individual
Bronze medal – third place	2025 Gwangju	Individual
Bronze medal – third place	2025 Gwangju	Team
World Cup Final
Gold medal – first place	2022 Tlaxcala	Individual
Gold medal – first place	2025 Nanjing	Individual
Asian Games
Gold medal – first place	2022 Hangzhou	Women's team
Silver medal – second place	2022 Hangzhou	Individual
Asian Championships
Gold medal – first place	2023 Bangkok	Team
World Cup
Gold medal – first place	2019 Berlin	Individual
Gold medal – first place	2019 Berlin	Mixed Team
Gold medal – first place	2022 Gwangju	Team
Gold medal – first place	2022 Medellín	Individual
Gold medal – first place	2022 Medellín	Team
Gold medal – first place	2023 Shanghai	Team
Gold medal – first place	2023 Medellín	Team
Gold medal – first place	2023 Paris	Team
Gold medal – first place	2025 Shanghai	Team
Gold medal – first place	2025 Madrid	Team
Silver medal – second place	2025 Antalya	Individual
Bronze medal – third place	2019 Berlin	Team
Bronze medal – third place	2023 Shanghai	Individual
Bronze medal – third place	2025 Antalya	Team
World Youth Championships
Silver medal – second place	2017 Rosario	Mixed team

An San (Korean: 안산; Hanja: 安山, born 27 February 2001) is a South Korean archer competing in women's recurve events. She won three gold medals at the 2020 Summer Olympics, in the women's team, mixed team and individual events, becoming the first archer in Olympic history to do so at a single Games. An also set a new Olympic Record scoring 680 points at the Women's Individual Archery's Ranking Round. The previous record of 673 points was set by Ukrainian Lina Herasymenko at the 1996 Summer Olympics.

== Career ==
An was born on 27 February 2001, in Gwangju, South Korea. She graduated from Kwangju Women's University.

=== 2017–2019: Early career ===
She competed at the 2017 World Archery Youth Championships where she won her first medal in mixed team event.

=== 2019–2020: International debut ===
She made her international debut at the 2019 Archery World Cup stage 4 in Berlin, winning gold in the women's individual, gold in the mixed team, and bronze in women's team event.

In 2020, she shot 1400, in the WA 1440 Round.

=== 2021–present: Olympic triple gold medalist ===
At 2020 Summer Olympics, she took three gold medals, one from the women's team event, which she won alongside Jang Min-hee and Kang Chae-young, another medal from the mixed team event with Kim Je-deok. Meanwhile, in the semifinals of the mixed team event, the so-called 'Robin Hood arrow', in which an arrow from An penetrates the arrow fired by Kim Je-deok, drew attention. The arrows were donated by the International Olympic Committee along with the uniforms of the two athletes and displayed at the IOC Olympic Museum in Lausanne, Switzerland. After winning in women's individual competition, beating Elena Osipova of Russia, she became triple gold medalist.

An has been subject to online harassment from Korean anti-feminists who criticize her short haircut and her enrollment at Gwangju Women's University. Some women have adopted the hair style in solidarity.

After Tokyo Olympics, she participated in 2021 World Archery Championships in Yankton. She teamed up with Kang Chae Young and Jang Min Hee, winning gold medal in women's team event. This is the 14th time South Korea women's team has won the world title. Later, she paired with Kim Woo-jin. The duo dispatched Russia in straight sets winning gold medal in mixed team event. She also won the bronze medal in the women's individual event, after losing in her semi-final to Casey Kaufhold of the United States.

== Filmography ==
=== Television shows ===
Year	Title	Role	Notes	Ref.
2021	Need for Womance	Main Cast		

== Listicles ==
Name of publisher, year listed, name of listicle, and placement
Publisher	Year	Listicle	Placement	Ref.
Forbes	2022	30 Under 30 Asia	Placed	
