= Archery at the 2023 Pan American Games – Women's team recurve =

Women's team recurve at the 2023 Pan American Games
- Venue: Archery Center
- Dates: November 1, November 4

Medalists
Gold medal	Catalina GNoriega; Casey Kaufhold; Jennifer Mucino-Fernandez	United States
Silver medal	Aída Román; Ángela Ruiz; Alejandra Valencia	Mexico
Bronze medal	Ana Rendón; Maira Sepúlveda; Carolina Posada	Colombia

The women's team recurve competition of the archery events at the 2023 Pan American Games was held on November 1 and 4 at the Archery Center in Santiago, Chile.

== Schedule ==
Date	Time	Round
November 1, 2023	09:20	Ranking Round
November 1, 2023	11:00	Quarterfinals
November 1, 2023	11:50	Semifinals
November 4, 2023	10:25	Final

== Results ==
=== Ranking round ===
The results were as follows:

Rank	Archer	Nation	Score	Note
1	Aída Román; Ángela Ruiz; Alejandra Valencia	Mexico	1972	
2	Catalina GNoriega; Casey Kaufhold; Jennifer Mucino-Fernandez	United States	1948	
3	Ana Rendón; Maira Sepúlveda; Carolina Posada	Colombia	1906	
4	Ane Marcelle dos Santos; Ana Clara Machado; Sarah Nikitin	Brazil	1905	
5	Stephanie Barrett; Virginie Chénier; Amelia Gagne	Canada	1850	
6	Matilde Baeza; Ariadna Esquella; Javiera Andrades	Chile	1804	
7	Maydenia Sarduy; Yailin Paredes; Larissa Pagan	Cuba	1721	
8	Nieves Arango; Daniela Chacón; Lisbeth Leoni	Venezuela	1634	

=== Elimination rounds ===
The results were as follows

Quarterfinals
1	Mexico	51	54	56
8	Venezuela	42	48	50
5	Canada	49	39	42
4	Brazil	49	49	49
3	Colombia	53	53	49	52
6	Chile	51	47	51	47
7	Cuba	46	50	43
2	United States	56	54	55

Semifinals
1	Mexico	54	57	55	53
4	Brazil	52	51	58	48
3	Colombia	52	51	56	53
2	United States	58	47	58	58

Final
1	Mexico	52	54	53
2	United States	53	54	55
Bronze medal match
4	Brazil	49	55	50	48	28
3	Colombia	43	51	55	53	28
