= Hsu Hsin-tzu =

Taiwanese archer (born 2007)

Personal information
- Born: 29 December 2007 (age 18)

Sport
- Sport: Archery
- Event: Recurve
Medal record
Women's recurve archery
Representing Chinese Taipei
World Championships
Gold medal – first place	2025 Gwangju	Team
World Cup
Silver medal – second place	2025 Madrid	Individual
Silver medal – second place	2025 Nanjing	Individual
Bronze medal – third place	2025 Central Florida	Team
World Youth Championships
Silver medal – second place	2025 Winnipeg	Team
Bronze medal – third place	2025 Winnipeg	Mixed team

Hsu Hsin-tzu (Chinese: 許芯慈; born 29 December 2007) is a Taiwanese archer who competes in recurve events. She won the gold medal in the women's team recurve event at the 2025 World Archery Championships.

== Education ==
Hsu attends New Taipei Municipal Sanmin Senior High School.

== Career ==
In August 2025, Hsu competed at the 2025 World Archery Youth Championships and won a silver medal in the under-21 women's team event and a bronze medal in the mixed team event. The next month she competed at the 2025 World Archery Championships and won a gold medal in the women's team event. During the final of the 2025 Archery World Cup she won a silver medal in the recurve women’s individual even, losing to An San following a shoot-off in the gold medal match.
