= Casey Kaufhold =

American archer (born 2004)

Personal information
- Born: March 6, 2004 (age 22)
- Home town: Lancaster, Pennsylvania, U.S.

Sport
- Country: United States
- Sport: Archery
- Event: Recurve
Medal record
Women's recurve archery
Representing United States
Olympic Games
Bronze medal – third place	2024 Paris	Mixed team
World Championships
Silver medal – second place	2021 Yankton	Individual
World Cup
Gold medal – first place	2022 Paris	Mixed team
Gold medal – first place	2023 Antalya	Mixed team
Gold medal – first place	2023 Paris	Individual
Gold medal – first place	2025 Shanghai	Team
Silver medal – second place	2019 Medellín	Mixed team
Silver medal – second place	2022 Gwangju	Mixed team
Silver medal – second place	2022 Medellín	Mixed team
Silver medal – second place	2025 Central Florida	Team
Silver medal – second place	2026 Puebla	Mixed team
Silver medal – second place	2026 Madrid	Team
Bronze medal – third place	2025 Antalya	Individual
Bronze medal – third place	2025 Madrid	Team
Indoor Archery World Series
Bronze medal – third place	2019 Strassen	Individual
Gold medal – first place	2021 February online (FINALS)	Individual
Gold medal – first place	2022 Las Vegas	Individual
Silver medal – second place	2022 Las Vegas (FINALS)	Individual
Bronze medal – third place	2023 Strassen	Individual
Silver medal – second place	2024 Las Vegas	Individual
Silver medal – second place	2024 Las Vegas (FINALS)	Individual
Gold medal – first place	2025 Chicago	Individual
Gold medal – first place	2025 Las Vegas	Individual
Gold medal – first place	2025 Las Vegas (FINALS)	Individual
Pan American Championships
Gold medal – first place	2024 Medellín	Individual
Gold medal – first place	2024 Medellín	Team
Gold medal – first place	2026 Tlaxcala	Team
Silver medal – second place	2022 Santiago	Team
Silver medal – second place	2022 Santiago	Mixed team
Silver medal – second place	2026 Tlaxcala	Individual
Bronze medal – third place	2022 Santiago	Individual
Pan American Games
Gold medal – first place	2019 Lima	Team
Gold medal – first place	2019 Lima	Mixed team
Gold medal – first place	2023 Santiago	Team
Gold medal – first place	2023 Santiago	Mixed team
Bronze medal – third place	2019 Lima	Individual
Bronze medal – third place	2023 Santiago	Individual
Junior Pan American Games
Gold medal – first place	2021 Cali-Valle	Mixed team
Silver medal – second place	2021 Cali-Valle	Team
Bronze medal – third place	2021 Cali-Valle	Individual

Casey Kaufhold (/ˈkɔːfoʊld/ KAW-fohld; born March 6, 2004) is an American archer competing in women's recurve events. She won the silver medal in the women's individual event at the 2021 World Archery Championships held in Yankton, United States. She competed in the women's individual and women's team events at the 2020 Summer Olympics held in Tokyo, Japan.

In 2019, Kaufhold won the bronze medal in the women's individual recurve event at the Pan American Games held in Lima, Peru. She also won the gold medal in both the women's team recurve and mixed team recurve events.

== Career ==
In 2019, Kaufhold competed in the women's team recurve event at the World Archery Championships held in 's-Hertogenbosch, Netherlands. Kaufhold, Khatuna Lorig and Erin Mickelberry advanced to the elimination rounds where they were eliminated in their first match against Sweden. In August 2019, Kaufhold and Josef Scarboro won the silver medal in the cadet mixed team recurve event at the World Archery Youth Championships held in Madrid, Spain.

In that same year, as part of the 2019 Archery World Cup, Kaufhold and Brady Ellison won the silver medal in the mixed team competition held in Medellín, Colombia. In September 2019, she set a new junior world record for the 72-arrow 70-metre ranking round with a score of 675 out of a possible 720 points.

Kaufhold qualified at the 2021 US Olympic Trials to represent the United States at the 2020 Summer Olympics in Tokyo, Japan. She also set a new under-21 world record of 682 out of a possible 720 points during the qualification round. At the 2020 Summer Olympics, she placed 17th in the ranking round in the women's individual event. In the competition bracket, she defeated Inés de Velasco of Spain and she was then eliminated by Ren Hayakawa of Japan. In the team competition, the American team finished in third place in the opening round and they were eliminated in the competition bracket by Svetlana Gomboeva, Elena Osipova and Ksenia Perova of the ROC.

Two months after the Olympics, Kaufhold won the silver medal in the women's individual event at the 2021 World Archery Championships held in Yankton, United States. In her semi-final, she defeated 2020 Tokyo Olympic champion An San of South Korea and, in her gold medal match, she lost against Jang Min-hee of South Korea. This was the first medal won by an American archer in this event in over thirty years. (Note: Denise Parker won bronze at the 1989 World Archery Championships held in Lausanne, Switzerland.) Two months later, she won three medals at the 2021 Junior Pan American Games held in Cali, Colombia: she won the gold medal in the mixed team event, the silver medal in the women's team event and the bronze medal in the women's individual event. A few months later, she won the 2021 Athlete of the Year award by World Archery Americas in the recurve cadet women category.

In 2022, she won the women's recurve event at the Vegas Shoot held in Las Vegas, United States.

Kaufhold competed at the 2023 World Archery Championships held in Berlin, Germany. She lost her bronze medal match in the women's individual recurve event. She also competed in the women's team recurve and recurve mixed team events. Kaufhold won three medals, including two gold medals, at the 2023 Pan American Games held in Santiago, Chile.

Kaufhold won two gold medals at the 2024 Pan American Archery Championships held in Medellín, Colombia: she won the gold medal in the women's individual recurve event and in the women's team recurve event.

Kaufhold and Brady Ellison won the bronze medal in the mixed team event at the 2024 Summer Olympics held in Paris, France. The duo faced off against Dhiraj Bommadevara and Ankita Bhakat of India in the Bronze Medal match, before defeating them to claim Bronze. She also competed in the women's individual and women's team events.

== Personal life ==
As of 2022, she studies visualization at the College of Architecture of Texas A&M University.
