= Baasandorjiin Oyun-Erdene =

Mongolian archer (born 2007)

Baasandorj Oyun-Erdene
Personal information
- Nationality: Mongolian
- Born: 12 May 2007 (age 19)

Sport
- Sport: Archery
Medal record
Women's recurve archery
Representing Mongolia
Asian Cup
| Gold medal – first place | 2026 Bangkok | Individual |
| Gold medal – first place | 2026 Bangkok | Mixed team |

Baasandorjiin Oyun-Erdene (Mongolian: Баасандоржийн Оюун-Эрдэнэ, born 12 May 2007) is a Mongolian archer. She won two gold medals at the opening stage of the 2026 Asian Cup in the mixed team and individual events.
