= Simranjeet Kaur =

Indian archery player

Personal information
- Nationality: Indian

Sport
- Sport: Archery
Medal record
Representing India
Asian Games
Bronze medal – third place	2022 Hangzhou	Women's team recurve

Simranjeet Kaur is an Indian archer. She won a bronze medal in the Women's team recurve event at the 2022 Asian Games.
