= Zhu Jingyi (archer) =

Chinese archer (born 2006)

Personal information
- Born: 31 August 2006 (age 20)

Sport
- Sport: Archery
- Event: Recurve
Medal record
Women's recurve archery
Representing China
World Championships
Silver medal – second place	2025 Gwangju	Individual
Asian Games
Gold medal – first place	2026 Aichi–Nagoya	Mixed team
Bronze medal – third place	2026 Aichi–Nagoya	Team
World Youth Championships
Silver medal – second place	2023 Limerick	Individual
Silver medal – second place	2023 Limerick	Team
Bronze medal – third place	2023 Limerick	Mixed team

Zhu Jingyi (born 31 August 2006) is a Chinese archer who competes in recurve events. She won the silver medal in the women's individual recurve event at the 2025 World Archery Championships.

== Career ==
Zhu competed at the 2023 World Archery Youth Championships and won silver medals in the women's individual and team events, and a bronze medal in the mixed team event. In September 2025, she competed at the 2025 World Archery Championships and won a silver medal in the women's individual event.
