= Ankita Bhakat =

Indian recurve archer (born 1998)

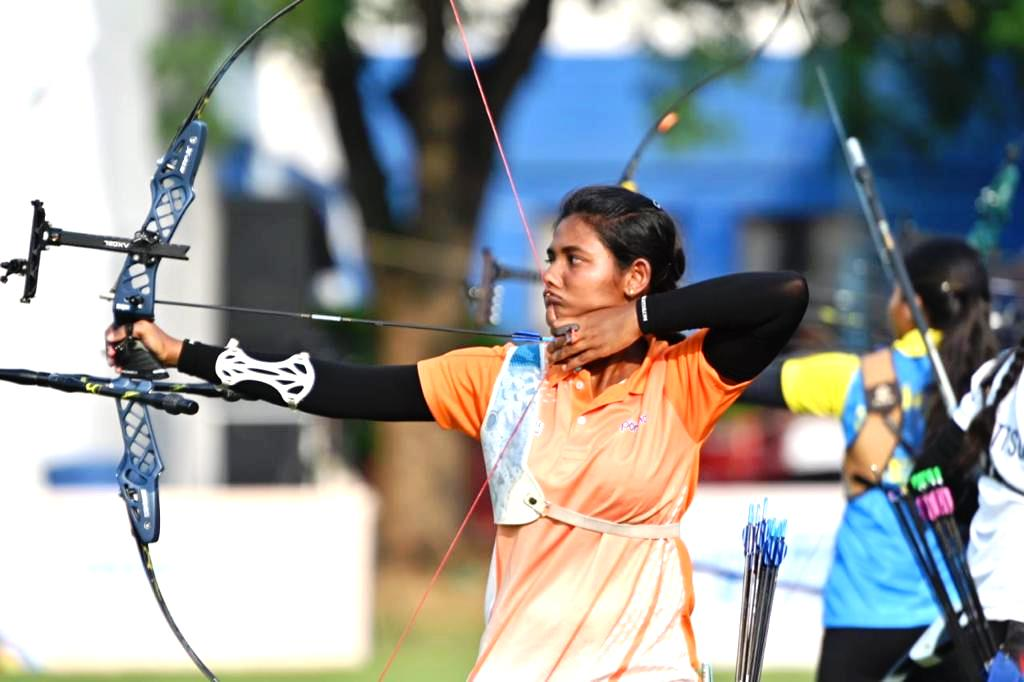
- Bhakat in 2021

Personal information
- Born: 17 June 1998 (age 28) Kolkata, West Bengal, India

Sport
- Sport: Archery
- Rank: Recurve
Medal record
Women's recurve archery
Representing India
Asian Games
Gold medal – first place	2026 Aichi–Nagoya	Team
Bronze medal – third place	2022 Hangzhou	Team
Asian Championships
Gold medal – first place	2025 Dhaka	Individual
Silver medal – second place	2021 Dhaka	Team
Bronze medal – third place	2021 Dhaka	Mixed team
Bronze medal – third place	2023 Bangkok	Team
World Cup
Gold medal – first place	2021 Guatemala	Team
Gold medal – first place	2021 Paris	Team
Gold medal – first place	2026 Shanghai	Team
Silver medal – second place	2022 Paris	Team
Bronze medal – third place	2021 Guatemala	Mixed team
Bronze medal – third place	2022 Gwangju	Team
Bronze medal – third place	2023 Paris	Team
Bronze medal – third place	2024 Shanghai	Mixed team
Asia Cup
Gold medal – first place	2016 Taipei	Individual
Gold medal – first place	2016 Taipei	Team
Gold medal – first place	2019 Bangkok	Mixed team
Silver medal – second place	2017 Bangkok	Team
Silver medal – second place	2019 Bangkok	Team
Bronze medal – third place	2016 Bangkok	Mixed team
Bronze medal – third place	2017 Taipei	Mixed team
World Youth Championships
Gold medal – first place	2017 Rosario	Team

Ankita Bhakat (born 17 June 1998) is an Indian recurve archer. Bhakat competed at the 2024 Paris Olympics, where she finished fourth in the recurve mixed team event after losing the bronze medal match.

== Early life ==
Bhakat was born on 17 June 1998 in Kolkata, West Bengal, to parents Shantanu Bhakat, a milkman, and Shila Bhakat.

She took up archery when she was ten, attending the Calcutta Archery Club for initial training. She joined the Tata Archery Academy at Jamshedpur in 2014, where she trained under Dharmendra Tiwari, Purnima Mahato and Ram Awdesh.

== Career ==
Based on her performance during the trials conducted by the Archery Association of India (AAI), Bhakat was selected to compete, as a part of the Indian national team, in the 2015 World Archery Youth Championships in Yankton, South Dakota in the United States. However, a week prior to the event, India withdrew as 18 people from their delegation did not receive visas for the US.

In the 2015 Seoul International Youth Archery Festa, held from 3 to 9 September in Seoul, Bhakat was part of the team that won two medals—a bronze in the girl's individual recurve competition and a silver in the girl's recurve team event. At the Indoor Archery World Cup (Stage 2), held from 10 to 11 December 2016 in Bangkok, Bhakat competed in the women's individual recurve competition where she defeated Prachi Singh 6–2 in an all-Indian first round match, but lost 0–6 to Jeon Hunyoung in the pre-quarter-finals.

Bhakat competed in the women's individual and women's recurve team events at the 2017 Asia Cup (Stage 2) held in Bangkok. In the former, she reached the quarter-finals, losing 2–6 to compatriot Deepika Kumari, whereas in the latter, she won a silver medal with her teammates, Promia Daimary and Sakshi Rajendra Shitole, losing 0–6 to Chinese Taipei in the final. That same month, she took part in the women's recurve competition at the 37th edition of the Indian Senior National Championships in Faridabad. She made it to the finals, losing 6–2 to Deepika Kumari.

Bhakat also competed at the 2017 Asia Cup (Stage 3) World Ranking Tournament, held from 4 to 9 July 2017 in Chinese Taipei, in three events—women's individual, women's team and mixed team. She won the bronze medal in the mixed team event with her partner Mukesh Boro. Later that year, she was among the 24 members who were selected to compete for the Indian national team in the 2017 World Archery Youth Championships at Rosario, Argentina following the completion of their training at Sonipat, Haryana.

At the World Youth Archery Championships, Bhakat competed in the recurve junior mixed team event with her partner Jemson Singh Ningthoujam, and together they were seeded ninth. The pair won the gold medal after defeating the Russian team 6–2 in the final, thus giving India its fourth overall world youth championships title and its first since Deepika Kumari won it in 2009 and 2011. They had defeated the top-seeded Korean team 5–4 in the quarter-final and the Ukrainian team 6–0 in the semi-final, respectively, en route to the final.

In April 2018, Bhakat competed at the 2018 Archery World Cup held from 23 to 29 April in Shanghai, China in the women's individual, women's team and the mixed team recurve events. In the individual recurve event, she was seeded eighth, after having scored 665 out of 720 points in the qualifications round. She defeated compatriot Bombayla Devi Laishram 6–4 in the third round, but lost 4–6 to China's An Qixuan in the fourth round. She teamed up with Promila Daimary and Deepika Kumara in the women's team event and with Atanu Das in the mixed team event, reaching the quarter-finals of both events before losing 1–5 and 4–5 to the Chinese and United States teams respectively.

Subsequently, in May 2018, Bhakat competed in the women's individual and women's recurve team events at the 2018 Archery World Cup – Stage 2 held in Antalya, Turkey. In the latter event, she teamed up with Promila Daimary and Deepika Kumari, and eventually reached the semi-finals by defeating the French and the Russian teams 5–3 and 5–1 in the second round and quarter-finals, respectively. In the semi-final, however, the Indian team lost 2–6 to the South Korean team. Subsequently, they faced Chinese Taipei in the bronze medal match, losing 2–6.

=== 2024 Summer Olympics ===
Bhakat made her first Olympic appearance in the 2024 Summer Olympics in Paris. She lost 4–6 to Poland's Wioleta Myszor in the Women's Individual 1/32 Elimination Round. Bhakat advanced to the quarterfinals in the Women's Team, along with Bhajan Kaur and Deepika Kumari. However, the team lost to the Netherlands' team 0–6. Bhakat made history, with Dhiraj Bommadevara by competing in India's first-ever Olympic medal in archery in the Mixed Team Bronze Medal Match, but lost 2–6 to the United States of America's team.
