= Jennifer Mucino-Fernandez =

American archer (born 2002)

Personal information
- Born: December 18, 2002 (age 23) Boston, Massachusetts, U.S.

Sport
- Sport: Archery
Medal record
Women's recurve archery
Representing United States
Pan American Games
Gold medal – first place	2023 Santiago	Team
Pan American Championships
Gold medal – first place	2024 Medellín	Team
Gold medal – first place	2026 Tlaxcala	Team
Gold medal – first place	2026 Tlaxcala	Individual
Silver medal – second place	2022 Santiago	Team
Silver medal – second place	2026 Tlaxcala	Mixed team

Jennifer Mucino-Fernandez (/muːˈsiːnoʊ/ moo-SEE-noh; born December 18, 2002) is an American archer. Mucino-Fernandez was born in Boston and raised in Mexico City. She competed in the women's individual event at the 2020 Summer Olympics.

== Personal life ==
Born in the United States, she is of Mexican descent.
