= Li Cai-xuan =

Taiwanese archer (born 2004)

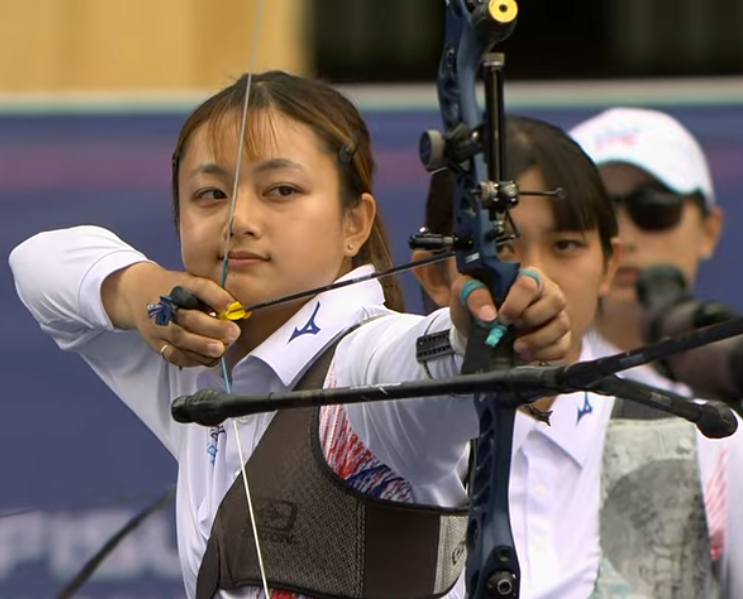
- At the 2025 Summer World University Games

Personal information
- Born: 6 June 2004 (age 22)

Sport
- Sport: Archery
- Event: Recurve
Medal record
Women's recurve archery
Representing Chinese Taipei
World Championships
Gold medal – first place	2025 Gwangju	Team
World University Games
Silver medal – second place	2025 Essen	Team

Li Cai-xuan (Chinese: 李采璇; born 6 June 2004) is a Taiwanese archer who competes in recurve events. She won the gold medal in the women's team recurve event at the 2025 World Archery Championships.

== Career ==
In July 2025, Li competed at the 2025 Summer World University Games and won a silver medal in the women's team event. In September 2025, she competed at the 2025 World Archery Championships and won a gold medal in the women's team event.
