= Chiu Yi-ching =

Taiwanese archer (born 2003)

Personal information
- Born: 16 October 2003 (age 22)
- Education: Tsinghua University
- Height: 1.65 m (5 ft 5 in)

Sport
- Sport: Archery
- Event: Recurve
- Coached by: Hsu Tzu-yi
Medal record
Women's recurve archery
Representing Chinese Taipei
World Championships
Gold medal – first place	2025 Gwangju	Team

Chiu Yi-ching (Chinese: 邱意晴; born 16 October 2003) is a Taiwanese archer who competes in recurve events. She represented Chinese Taipei at the 2024 Summer Olympics. She won the gold medal in the women's team recurve event at the 2025 World Archery Championships.

== Career ==
In September 2025, Chiu competed at the 2025 World Archery Championships and won a gold medal in the women's team event.

== Personal life ==
Chiu attends Tsinghua University and studies sports science.
