= Catalina GNoriega =

American archer (born 2003)

Personal information
- Born: March 17, 2003 (age 23) San Diego, California, U.S.

Sport
- University team: Texas A&M

Achievements and titles
- Highest world ranking: 11
Medal record
Women's recurve archery
Representing United States
Gold medal – first place	2023 PanAm Games	Team recurve
Gold medal – first place	2024 PanAm Champ	Team recurve
World Cup
Gold medal – first place	2025 Antalya	Team
Silver medal – second place	2025 Florida	Team
Silver medal – second place	2026 Madrid	Team
Bronze medal – third place	2025 Madrid	Team

Catalina GNoriega (born March 17, 2003 in San Diego), is an American archer and Olympian. She previously trained at the Chula Vista Elite Athlete Training Center from March 2018 to October 2023. She currently lives and trains in Texas.

She has been part of the USA Archery Team since 2020, winning multiple indoor and outdoor competitions.

She has previous competed in the 2024 Summer Olympics, and was a gold medalist at the 2023 Pan American Games in women's team recurve. She has also competed at the 2018 Summer Youth Olympics.

== Personal life ==
GNoriega revealed she is currently pursuing an undergraduate degree in Sports Management at Texas A&M, where she also competes on their collegiate Archery team.
