= Kang Chae-young =

South Korean archer (born 1996)

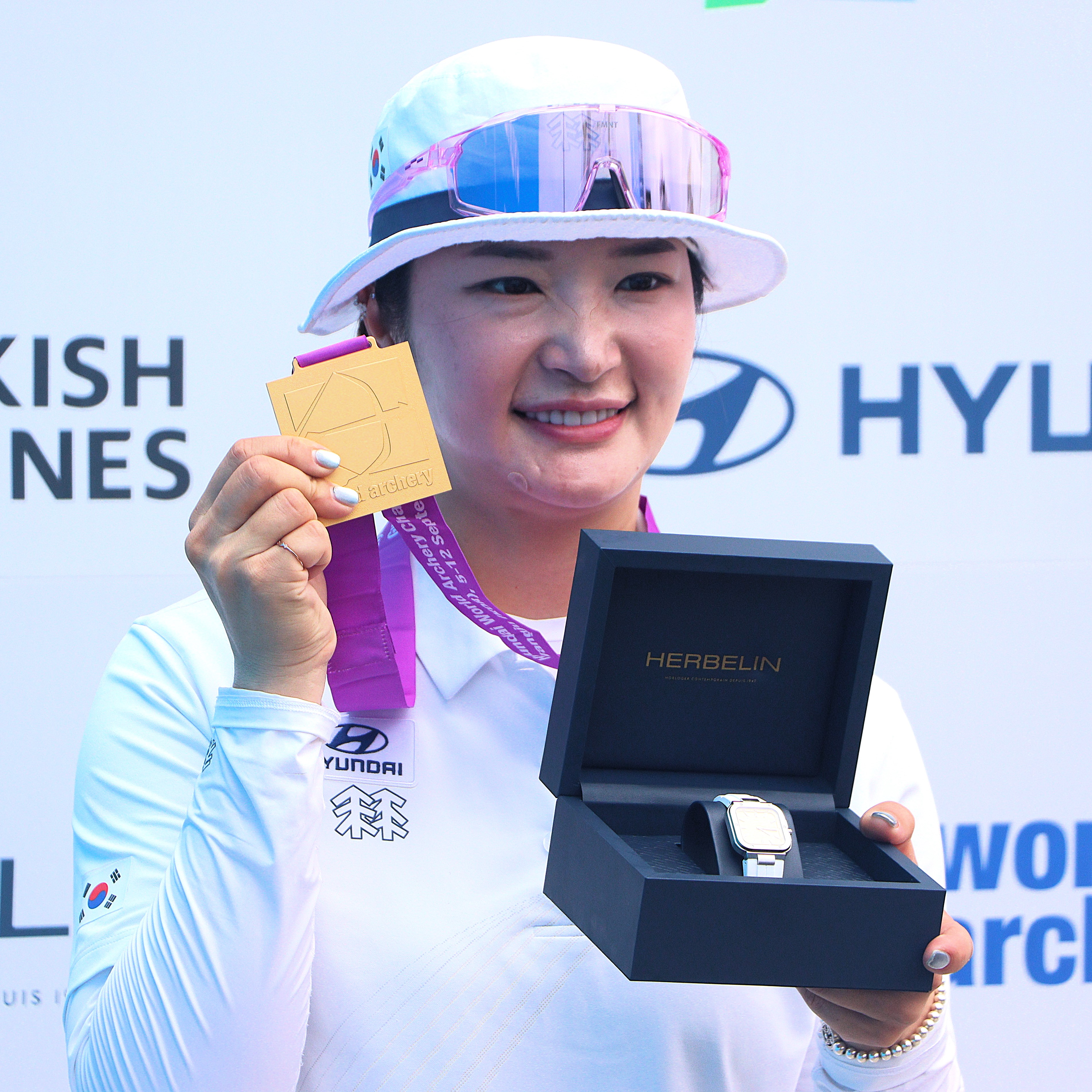
- Kang in 2025

Personal information
- Born: 8 June 1996 (age 30) Ulsan, South Korea

Sport
- Country: South Korea
- Sport: Archery
- Event: Recurve
Medal record
Women's recurve archery
Representing South Korea
Olympic Games
Gold medal – first place	2020 Tokyo	Team
World Championships
Gold medal – first place	2017 Mexico City	Team
Gold medal – first place	2017 Mexico City	Mixed team
Gold medal – first place	2019 's-Hertogenbosch	Mixed team
Gold medal – first place	2021 Yankton	Team
Gold medal – first place	2025 Gwangju	Individual
Silver medal – second place	2019 's-Hertogenbosch	Individual
Silver medal – second place	2019 's-Hertogenbosch	Team
Bronze medal – third place	2015 Copenhagen	Team
Bronze medal – third place	2025 Gwangju	Team
World Cup Final
Gold medal – first place	2019 Moscow	Individual
Gold medal – first place	2019 Moscow	Mixed team
Asian Games
Gold medal – first place	2018 Jakarta	Team
Silver medal – second place	2026 Aichi–Nagoya	Team
Bronze medal – third place	2018 Jakarta	Individual
Bronze medal – third place	2026 Aichi–Nagoya	Mixed team
Summer Universiade
Gold medal – first place	2017 Taipei	Individual
Gold medal – first place	2017 Taipei	Team
Gold medal – first place	2019 Naples	Individual
Gold medal – first place	2019 Naples	Team
Silver medal – second place	2015 Gwangju	Team
Asian Championships
Gold medal – first place	2019 Bangkok	Individual
Gold medal – first place	2019 Bangkok	Team
Gold medal – first place	2019 Bangkok	Mixed team

Kang Chae-young (Korean: 강채영, born 8 June 1996) is a South Korean archer competing in women's recurve events. She has won numerous medals in archery competitions.

Kang was born in Ulsan, South Korea. She attended Ulsan Jung-ang Elementary School.

== Career ==
At the 2017 Summer Universiade held in Taipei, Taiwan, she won the gold medal in the women's individual recurve and women's team recurve events. In the same year, she also won the gold medals in the team and mixed team events at the 2017 World Archery Championships held in Mexico City, Mexico.

In 2018, she represented South Korea at the Asian Games in Jakarta, Indonesia and she won two medals: the bronze medal in the women's individual recurve event and the gold medal in the women's team recurve event.

In 2019, she won the gold medal in the women's recurve event in the final of the 2019 Archery World Cup. This was her first Archery World Cup final. She also won the stages of the competition held in both Medellín, Colombia and Shanghai, China. At the 2019 World Archery Championships, she broke the world record for the 70m ranking round with a score of 692, before medalling in the individual, mixed team and team events. In that same year, she won the gold medal in the women's individual, women's team and mixed team events at the 2019 Asian Archery Championships held in Bangkok, Thailand.

In 2020, she won the 2019 World Archery Athlete of the Year award in the recurve women's category.

In 2021, she qualified in first place for the South Korean women's team nominated to the 2020 Summer Olympics in Tokyo, Japan and won the gold medal in the women's team event. Two months later, she also won the gold medal in the women's team event at the 2021 World Archery Championships held in Yankton, United States.

Her nickname is "The Destroyer."
