= Syaqiera Mashayikh =

Malaysian archer (born 2000)

Personal information
- Full name: Syaqiera binti Mashayikh
- Nickname: Syaqiera
- Nationality: Malaysian
- Born: 24 November 2000 (age 25) Segamat, Johor

Sport
- Country: Malaysia
- Sport: Archery
- Event: Recurve bow
Medal record
Women's archery
Representing Malaysia
Southeast Asian Games
Silver medal – second place	2021 Hanoi	Mixed team
Bronze medal – third place	2021 Hanoi	Individual

Syaqiera binti Mashayikh (born 24 November 2000 in Segamat, Johor) is a Malaysian archer. She qualified for the 2020 Summer Olympics, became the third Malaysian woman archer to feature in the Olympics after Mon Redee Sut Txi in Athens 2004 and Nurul Syafiqah Hashim in London 2012.

She competed at the 2021 Archery World Cup.
