= 2025 World Archery Championships – Men's individual compound =

Men's individual compound at the 2025 World Archery Championships
- Venue: Gwangju International Archery Center
- Location: Gwangju, South Korea
- Dates: 6–8 September
- Competitors: 121 from 52 nations

Medalists
gold medal	Nicolas Girard	France
silver medal	Mathias Fullerton	Denmark
bronze medal	Choi Yong-hee	South Korea

The men's individual compound competition at the 2025 World Archery Championships, which will take place from 6 to 8 September 2025 in Gwangju, South Korea. The reigning world champion Ojas Pravin Deotale was not chosen for the Indian team, so he did not compete.

== Schedule ==
All times are in Korea Standard Time (UTC+09:00).

Date	Time	Round
Friday, 5 September		Official practice
Saturday, 6 September	09:00	Qualification round
Sunday, 7 September	09:15; 09:53; 10:30	Elimination Round; First Round (1/48); Second round (1/24); Third Round (1/16)
Monday, 8 September	10:02; 14:05; 15:00; 15:30; 15:42	Final Round; Fourth round (1/8); Quarter-finals; Semi-finals; Bronze-medal match Gold-medal match

== Qualification round ==
Results after 72 arrows.104 archers qualified to Elimination round.

High green denotes at least one round bye.
Light green denotes entering from first round.

Rank	Name	Nation	Score	10+X	X
1	Nicolas Girard	France	713	66	36
2	Kim Jong-ho	South Korea	713	66	32
3	Mike Schloesser	Netherlands	713	65	34
4	Chang Cheng-wei	Chinese Taipei	712	64	28
5	Roberto Hernández	El Salvador	712	64	26
6	Mathias Fullerton	Denmark	711	64	35
7	Emircan Haney	Turkey	709	61	26
8	Rishabh Yadav	India	709	61	26
9	Przemysław Konecki	Poland	709	61	34
10	Curtis Broadnax	United States	708	63	40
11	Choi Eun-gyu	South Korea	708	60	34
12	Yağız Sezgin	Turkey	708	60	29
13	Choi Yong-hee	South Korea	708	60	27
14	Nico Wiener	Austria	707	59	33
15	Aman Saini	India	707	59	33
16	Ivan Zhulin	Individual Neutral Athletes	707	59	23
17	Mohd Juwaidi Mazuki	Malaysia	707	59	22
18	Ajay Scott	Great Britain	706	58	34
19	Prathamesh Fuge	India	706	58	23
20	Shamai Yamrom	Israel	705	58	33
21	Sebastián García	Mexico	705	57	30
22	Michea Godano	Italy	705	57	25
23	Jean Pizarro	Puerto Rico	704	58	28
24	Robin Jäätma	Estonia	704	57	31
25	Pedro Salazar	Guatemala	704	56	29
26	Martin Damsbo	Denmark	704	56	27
27	Douglas Nolasco	El Salvador	704	56	26
28	Andrey Tyutyun	Kazakhstan	704	56	26
29	James Lutz	United States	703	57	43
30	Elías Reyes Cravioto	Mexico	703	57	18
31	Tim Jevšnik	Slovenia	703	56	36
32	Jairo Rodrigo da Silva	Brazil	703	56	28
33	Prima Wisnu Wardhana	Indonesia	703	56	25
34	Jean-Philippe Boulch	France	702	55	25
35	Chen Chieh-lun	Chinese Taipei	702	55	25
36	Staš Modic	Slovenia	702	54	25
37	Lorenzo Gubbini	Italy	702	54	25
38	Paolo Kunsch	Germany	701	55	27
39	Łukasz Przybylski	Poland	701	53	31
40	Wu Z-wei	Chinese Taipei	701	53	24
41	Sostar Andaru Rinaldi	Indonesia	700	53	24
42	Hendre Verhoef	South Africa	700	53	20
43	Brandon Hawes	Australia	700	53	20
44	José Marcelo del Cid	Guatemala	699	53	28
45	Aljaž Brenk	Slovenia	699	52	31
46	Luke Davis	Great Britain	699	51	31
47	Jordan Adachi	Canada	699	51	25
48	Batuhan Akçaoğlu	Turkey	699	51	24
49	Adam Carpenter	Great Britain	699	51	23
50	Ryan M. Hidayat	Indonesia	698	53	17
51	Jozef Bošanský	Slovakia	698	52	18
52	Rodrigo González	Mexico	697	53	18
53	Álvaro Pardo	Spain	697	51	24
54	François Dubois	France	697	51	19
55	Daniel Muñoz	Colombia	697	50	22
56	Domagoj Buden	Croatia	697	49	14
57	Nguyễn Trung Chiến	Vietnam	696	53	17
58	Dilmukhamet Mussa	Kazakhstan	696	50	17
59	Miguel Véliz	El Salvador	696	49	24
60	Csaba Balogh	Hungary	696	49	18
61	Daniil Kosenkov	Individual Neutral Athletes	695	51	19
62	Yiftach Hadar	Israel	695	50	25
63	Andrew Fagan	Canada	695	50	21
64	Bailey Wildman	Australia	695	49	23
65	Grady Kane	United States	695	49	22
66	Henning Lüpkemann	Germany	695	49	19
67	Akbarali Karabayev	Kazakhstan	695	49	18
68	Jonas Grigaravičius	Lithuania	695	49	18
69	Noah Nuber	Germany	695	48	23
70	Jacob Benschjöld	Sweden	695	48	20
71	Stef Willems	Netherlands	693	48	22
72	Rafael Magalhães Moreira	Brazil	693	46	18
73	Elia Fregnan	Italy	691	45	14
74	Nguyễn Trọng Hải	Vietnam	692	47	15
75	Wang Jiuyi	China	692	46	12
76	Dương Duy Bảo	Vietnam	691	46	20
77	Paul Marton de la Cruz	Philippines	690	48	21
78	Stefan Hansson	Sweden	690	46	22
79	Belal Al-Awadi	Saudi Arabia	690	45	21
80	Julien Fraipont	Belgium	690	45	14
81	László Szíjártó	Hungary	689	52	21
82	Jay Tjin-A-Djie	Netherlands	689	46	19
83	Mick Fleurinck	Belgium	689	42	17
84	Julio Alfredo Barillas Aragón	Guatemala	688	51	23
85	Himu Bachhar	Bangladesh	688	49	20
86	Viktor Orosz	Hungary	687	43	18
87	Fabián Seymour Bosso	Chile	686	45	17
88	Harry Neve	Australia	686	43	19
89	Eer Jiang Ying	Singapore	685	43	20
90	Rafał Dobrowolski	Poland	685	42	20
91	Ryo Takamune	Japan	685	41	21
92	Woon Teng Ng	Singapore	683	40	20
93	Mario Vavro	Croatia	683	39	9
94	Quentin Croes	Belgium	681	45	18
95	Erwan Zulfaqar	Singapore	681	36	16
96	Abdullah Al-Abdullatif	Saudi Arabia	678	38	12
97	Martin Vaněk	Czech Republic	677	40	19
98	Eshaq Al-Daghman	Iraq	677	37	14
99	Alfreð Birgisson	Iceland	677	37	10
100	Xu Jin	Macau	677	36	12
101	Florante Matan	Philippines	677	35	9
102	Jóannes Poulsen	Faroe Islands	676	38	12
103	Ngai Ho Chun Justin	Hong Kong	674	35	15
104	Ivan Siniaev	Individual Neutral Athletes	674	32	14
105	Alexander Kullberg	Sweden	673	36	15
106	Carl Vangeo Datan	Philippines	672	40	20
107	Jean-David Morin	Canada	672	31	11
108	Lee Hoo Sam Patrick	Hong Kong	670	32	9
109	Marius Grigaravičius	Lithuania	670	29	10
110	Sviatoslav Karpenko	Ukraine	668	27	13
111	Sze Sing Yu	Hong Kong	666	28	13
112	Narmandakh Davaasambuu	Mongolia	665	25	6
113	Martin Laursen	Denmark	664	30	16
114	Nikkel Petersen	Faroe Islands	662	21	5
115	Kfir Frank	Israel	661	29	9
116	Dagur Örn Fannarsson	Iceland	659	27	10
117	Filip Reitmeier	Czech Republic	658	29	10
118	Jógvan Niclasen	Faroe Islands	657	28	6
119	Enkhsaikhan Buyant	Mongolia	634	17	5
120	Unenbat Batchuluun	Mongolia	621	19	11
121	William Moraes Rego de Souza	Brazil	606	21	5

== Final round ==
Quarter-finals
1	(France) Nicolas Girard	146
8	(India) Rishabh Yadav	145
12	(Turkey) Yağız Sezgin	147
13	(South Korea) Choi Yong-hee	148
19	(India) Prathamesh Fuge	148^{9}
6	(Denmark) Mathias Fullerton	148^{10}
10	(United States) Curtis Broadnax	147
15	(India) Aman Saini	144

Semi-finals
1	(France) Nicolas Girard	149^{10}
13	(South Korea) Choi Yong-hee	149^{9}
6	(Denmark) Mathias Fullerton	148
10	(United States) Curtis Broadnax	147

Final
1	(France) Nicolas Girard	150
6	(Denmark) Mathias Fullerton	149
Third place
14	(South Korea) Choi Yong-hee	146
10	(United States) Curtis Broadnax	145

== Elimination round ==
(+) Won the shoot-off by arrow closer to the center of the target.

=== Section 1 ===
1/48 finals
33	(Indonesia) PW Wardhana	143
80	(Belgium) J Fraipont	145
81	(Hungary) L Szíjártó	145
32	(Brazil) JR da Silva	146
17	(Malaysia) MJ Mazuki	147
96	(Saudi Arabia) A Al-Abdullatif	142
65	(United States) G Kane	143
48	(Turkey) B Akçaoğlu	146
49	(United Kingdom) A Carpenter	146
64	(Australia) B Wildman	144
97	(Czech Republic) M Vaněk	138
16	(Individual Neutral Athletes) I Zhulin	147

1/24 finals
80	(Belgium) J Fraipont	145
32	(Brazil) JR da Silva	144
17	(Malaysia) MJ Mazuki	145
48	(Turkey) B Akçaoğlu	146
49	(United Kingdom) A Carpenter	146
16	(Individual Neutral Athletes) I Zhulin	148

1/16 finals
1	(France) N Girard	148
80	(Belgium) J Fraipont	140
48	(Turkey) B Akçaoğlu	148
16	(Individual Neutral Athletes) I Zhulin	146

1/8 finals
1	(France) N Girard	150
48	(Turkey) B Akçaoğlu	147

=== Section 2 ===
1/48 finals
9	(Poland) P Konecki	147
104	(Individual Neutral Athletes) I Siniaev	140
57	(Vietnam) TC Nguyễn	144
56	(Croatia) D Buden	147
41	(Indonesia) SA Rinaldi	143^{8}
72	(Brazil) R Magalhães Moreira	143^{9}
89	(Singapore) JY Eer	143
24	(Estonia) R Jäätma	145
25	(Guatemala) P Salazar	145
88	(Australia) H Neve	147
73	(Italy) E Fregnan	147
40	(Chinese Taipei) Wu Z-w	144

1/24 finals
9	(Poland) P Konecki	147
56	(Croatia) D Buden	146
72	(Brazil) R Magalhães Moreira	140
24	(Estonia) R Jäätma	148
88	(Australia) H Neve	145
73	(Italy) E Fregnan	147

1/16 finals
9	(Poland) P Konecki	147^{10}
24	(Estonia) R Jäätma	147^{10+}
73	(Italy) E Fregnan	138
8	(India) R Yadav	148

1/8 finals
24	(Estonia) R Jäätma	140
8	(India) R Yadav	148

=== Section 3 ===
1/48 finals
37	(Italy) L Gubbini	143
76	(Vietnam) DB Dương	144
85	(Bangladesh) H Bachhar	145
28	(Kazakhstan) A Tyutyun	146
21	(Mexico) S García	147
92	(Singapore) TN Woon	138
69	(Germany) N Nuber	145^{10+}
44	(Guatemala) JM del Cid	145^{10}
53	(Spain) Á Pardo	142
60	(Hungary) C Balogh	140
101	(Philippines) F Matan	142
12	(Turkey) Y Sezgin	147

1/24 finals
76	(Vietnam) DB Dương	144
28	(Kazakhstan) A Tyutyun	146
21	(Mexico) S García	145
69	(Germany) N Nuber	142
53	(Spain) Á Pardo	145^{10}
12	(Turkey) Y Sezgin	145^{10+}

1/16 finals
5	(El Salvador) R Hernández	147
28	(Kazakhstan) A Tyutyun	148
21	(Mexico) S García	144
12	(Turkey) Y Sezgin	148

1/8 finals
28	(Kazakhstan) A Tyutyun	145
12	(Turkey) Y Sezgin	146

=== Section 4 ===
1/48 finals
13	(South Korea) Choi Y-h	150
100	(Macau) Xu J	141
61	(Individual Neutral Athletes) D Kosenkov	142
52	(Mexico) R González	144
45	(Slovenia) A Brenk	147
68	(Lithuania) J Grigaravičius	148
93	(Croatia) M Vavro	138
20	(Israel) S Yamrom	149
29	(United States) J Lutz	146
84	(Guatemala) JA Barillas Aragón	145
77	(Philippines) PM de la Cruz	144
36	(Slovenia) S Modic	142

1/24 finals
13	(South Korea) Choi Y-h	146^{X+}
52	(Mexico) R González	146^{X}
68	(Lithuania) J Grigaravičius	143
20	(Israel) S Yamrom	147
29	(United States) J Lutz	150
77	(Philippines) PM de la Cruz	142

1/16 finals
13	(South Korea) Choi Y-h	144
20	(Israel) S Yamrom	143
29	(United States) J Lutz	150
4	(Chinese Taipei) Chang C-w	148

1/8 finals
13	(South Korea) Choi Y-h	147
29	(United States) J Lutz	146

=== Section 5 ===
1/48 finals
35	(Chinese Taipei) Chen C-l	147
78	(Sweden) S Hansson	145
83	(Belgium) M Fleurinck	139
30	(Mexico) E Reyes Cravioto	147
19	(India) P Fuge	146
94	(Belgium) Q Croes	142
67	(Kazakhstan) A Karabayev	147
46	(United Kingdom) L Davis	144
51	(Slovakia) J Bošanský	142
62	(Israel) Y Hadar	144
99	(Iceland) A Birgisson	142
14	(Austria) N Wiener	148

1/24 finals
35	(Chinese Taipei) Chen C-l	146
30	(Mexico) E Reyes Cravioto	144
19	(India) P Fuge	149
67	(Kazakhstan) A Karabayev	147
62	(Israel) Y Hadar	146^{10}
14	(Austria) N Wiener	146^{10+}

1/16 finals
3	(Netherlands) M Schloesser	150
35	(Chinese Taipei) Chen C-l	148
19	(India) P Fuge	149
14	(Austria) N Wiener	148

1/8 finals
3	(Netherlands) M Schloesser	149
19	(India) P Fuge	150

=== Section 6 ===
1/48 finals
11	(South Korea) Choi E-g	149
102	(Faroe Islands) J Poulsen	142
59	(El Salvador) M Véliz	140
54	(France) F Dubois	146
43	(Australia) B Hawes	143
70	(Sweden) J Benschjöld	144
91	(Japan) R Takamune	145
22	(Italy) M Godano	146
27	(El Salvador) D Nolasco	144
86	(Hungary) V Orosz	142
75	(China) Wang JY	142
38	(Germany) P Kunsch	148

1/24 finals
11	(South Korea) Choi E-g	147
54	(France) F Dubois	144
70	(Sweden) J Benschjöld	141
22	(Italy) M Godano	146
27	(El Salvador) D Nolasco	148^{10+}
38	(Germany) P Kunsch	148^{10}

1/16 finals
11	(South Korea) Choi E-g	143
22	(Italy) M Godano	146
27	(El Salvador) D Nolasco	145
6	(Denmark) M Fullerton	146

1/8 finals
22	(Italy) M Godano	147
6	(Denmark) M Fullerton	149

=== Section 7 ===
1/48 finals
39	(Poland) L Przybylski	147
74	(Vietnam) TH Nguyễn	144
87	(Chile) F Seymour Bosso	140
26	(Denmark) M Damsbo	149
23	(Puerto Rico) J Pizarro	141^{10}
90	(Poland) R Dobrowolski	141^{9}
71	(Netherlands) S Willems	139
42	(South Africa) H Verhoef	148
55	(Colombia) D Muñoz	148
58	(Kazakhstan) D Mussa	143
103	(Hong Kong) Ngai HCJ	118
10	(United States) C Broadnax	145

1/24 finals
39	(Poland) L Przybylski	144
26	(Denmark) M Damsbo	146
23	(Puerto Rico) J Pizarro	144
42	(South Africa) H Verhoef	147
55	(Colombia) D Muñoz	147
10	(United States) C Broadnax	149

1/16 finals
7	(Turkey) E Haney	149
26	(Denmark) M Damsbo	145
42	(South Africa) H Verhoef	143
10	(United States) C Broadnax	148

1/8 finals
7	(Turkey) E Haney	146
10	(United States) C Broadnax	149

=== Section 8 ===
1/48 finals
15	(India) A Saini	148
98	(Iraq) E Al-Daghman	147
63	(Canada) A Fagan	147
50	(Indonesia) RM Hidayat	145
47	(Canada) J Adachi	145
66	(Germany) H Lüpkemann	143
95	(Singapore) E Zulfaqar	144
18	(United Kingdom) A Scott	149
31	(Slovenia) T Jevšnik	143
82	(Netherlands) J Tjin-A-Djie	142
79	(Saudi Arabia) B Al-Awadi	145
34	(France) J-P Boulch	148

1/24 finals
15	(India) A Saini	147
63	(Canada) A Fagan	146
47	(Canada) J Adachi	145
18	(United Kingdom) A Scott	148
31	(Slovenia) T Jevšnik	146
34	(France) J-P Boulch	147

1/16 finals
15	(India) A Saini	147^{X}
18	(United Kingdom) A Scott	147^{10}
34	(France) J-P Boulch	146^{X+}
2	(South Korea) Kim J-h	146^{X}

1/8 finals
15	(India) A Saini	144
34	(France) J-P Boulch	143
