= India at the 2022 World Games =

- IOC code: IND
- NOC: Indian Olympic Association

in Birmingham, United States 7 July 2022 – 17 July 2022
- Competitors: 10 (5 men and 5 women) in 5 sports
- Medals Ranked 70th: Gold 0 Silver 0 Bronze 1 Total 1

World Games appearances (overview)
- 1981; 1985; 1989; 1993; 1997; 2001; 2005; 2009; 2013; 2017; 2022; 2025

India competed at the 2022 World Games held in Birmingham, United States from 7 to 17 July 2022. Athletes representing India won one bronze medal and the country finished in 70th place in the medal table.

== Medalists ==
Medal	Name	Sport	Event	Date
Bronze	Jyothi Surekha Vennam; Abhishek Verma	Archery	Mixed team compound	9 July

== Competitors ==
Sport	Men	Women	Total	Events
Archery	2	2	4	3
Cue sports	1	1	2	2
Road speed skating	1	2	3	2
Track speed Skating	1	2	3	4
Wushu	1	0	1	1
Total	5	5	10	12

== Archery ==
India competed in archery.

Men

Athlete	Event	Ranking round		Round of 32	Round of 16	Quarterfinal	Semifinal	Final / BM	
Athlete	Event	Score	Seed	Opposition Score	Opposition Score	Opposition Score	Opposition Score	Opposition Score	Rank
Abhishek Verma	Men's compound	707	9	(United States) Thompson; W148-140	(Estonia) Jäätma; W149-148	(Netherlands) Schloesser; W^{10+}148-148^{10}	(France) Boulch; L141-143	(Canada) Perkins; L145-148	4
Aman Saini	Men's compound	695	20	(Colombia) Muñoz; W147-142	(France) Boulch; L145-148	did not advance			

Women

Athlete	Event	Ranking round		Round of 32	Round of 16	Quarterfinal	Semifinal	Final / BM	
Athlete	Event	Score	Seed	Opposition Score	Opposition Score	Opposition Score	Opposition Score	Opposition Score	Rank
Jyoti Vennam	Women's compound	702	6	Bye	(El Salvador) Paiz; W149-143	(Slovenia) Ellison; L148-149	did not advance		
Muskan Kirar	Women's compound	700	7	Bye	(Puerto Rico) Ramípez; W146-145	(Colombia) López; L143-148	did not advance		

Mixed team

Athlete	Event	Ranking round		Round of 32	Round of 16	Quarterfinal	Semifinal	Final / BM	
Athlete	Event	Score	Seed	Opposition Score	Opposition Score	Opposition Score	Opposition Score	Opposition Score	Rank
Jyoti Vennam; Abhishek Verma	Mixed team compound	1409	1	—	—	(New Zealand) New Zealand; W156-155	(Colombia) Colombia; L157-159	(Mexico) Mexico; W157-156	3rd place, bronze medalist(s)

== Cue sports ==
India competed in cue sports.

Athletes	Event	Round of 16	Quarterfinal	Semifinal	Final / BM
Athletes	Event	Opposition Score	Opposition Score	Opposition Score	Opposition Score
Pankaj Advani	Men's Snooker	(United Kingdom) Darren Morgan; L1-3	did not advance		
Chitra Magimairajan	women's 9-ball pool	(United Kingdom) Kelly Fisher; L3-9	did not advance		

== Road speed skating ==
India competed in road speed skating.

== Track speed skating ==
India competed in track speed skating.

== Wushu ==
India competed in wushu.

Athlete	Event	Apparatus 1		Apparatus 2		Total	
Athlete	Event	Score	Rank	Score	Rank	Score	Rank
Brahmna Sanma	Men's taijiquan&taijijian combined	9.133	4	9.047	4	18.180	4
