= India at the 2009 World Games =

Sporting event delegation

- IOC code: IND

in Kaohsiung, Taiwan 16 July 2009 – 26 July 2009
- Competitors: 10
- Medals: Gold 0 Silver 0 Bronze 0 Total 0

World Games appearances (overview)
- 1981; 1985; 1989; 1993; 1997; 2001; 2005; 2009; 2013; 2017; 2022; 2025

India participated in World Games 2009 in Kaohsiung, Taiwan with 6 athletes, but failed to win any medals.

== Athletes ==
Name	Sport	Result
Saurav Ghosal	Men's Singles - Squash	Quarter-Final
Ritwik Bhattacharya	Men's Singles - Squash	Round of 32
Joshna Chinappa	Women's Singles - Squash	Round of 16
Hetal Sudhir Kumar Dave	Middleweight Women - Sumo	Round of 16
Amit Chaudhary	Bodybuilding - Middleweight	5th
Nepram Kishan Singh	Bodybuilding - Lightweight	4th
