= El Salvador at the 2025 World Games =

- IOC code: ESA
- NOC: El Salvador Olympic Committee

in Chengdu, China 7 August 2025 – 17 August 2025
- Competitors: 1 (0 men and 1 woman) in 1 sport and 5 events
- Medals Ranked 34th: Gold 2 Silver 0 Bronze 0 Total 2

World Games appearances
- 1981; 1985; 1989; 1993; 1997; 2001; 2005; 2009; 2013; 2017; 2022; 2025

El Salvador competed at the 2025 World Games held in Chengdu, China from 7 to 17 August 2025.

The only athlete representing El Salvador, Ivonne Nóchez won two gold medals. This is the first gold medal won by El Salvador in the World Games. The country finished in 34th place in the medal table.

== Medalist ==
Medal	Name	Sport	Event	Date
Gold	Ivonne Nóchez	Road speed skating	Women's 100 metre sprint	13 August
Gold	Ivonne Nóchez	Track speed skating	Women's 200 metre dual time trial	14 August

== Competitors ==
The following is the list of number of competitors in the Games.

Sport	Men	Women	Total
Speed skating	0	1	1
Total	0	1	1
