= Archery at the 2025 World Games – Men's individual compound =

Men's individual compound at the 2025 World Games
- Venue: Qinglong Lake, Chengdu, China
- Dates: 7–9 August 2025
- Competitors: 26 from 20 nations

Medalists
gold medal	Mike Schloesser	Netherlands
silver medal	Curtis Broadnax	United States
bronze medal	Rishabh Yadav	India

The men's individual compound archery competition at the 2025 World Games were held from 7 to 9 August 2025 at the Qinglong Lake in Chengdu, China. Mike Schloesser of Netherlands claimed the men's event title and his first ever World Games gold medal by defeating USA's Curtis Broadnax in a high scoring gold-medal match, while Rishabh Yadav of India clinched the bronze medal respectively.

== Competition format ==
A total of 26 athletes entered the competition. The ranking round was held to determine seeding. Athletes competed in a single-elimination tournament.

== Participating nations ==
- Australia (1)
- Austria (1)
- China (2)
- Colombia (1)
- Denmark (1)
- France (1)
- Guatemala (1)
- India (3)
- Israel (1)
- Italy (1)
- South Korea (1)
- Malaysia (1)
- Mexico (1)
- Netherlands (1)
- New Zealand (1)
- Puerto Rico (1)
- South Africa (2)
- Slovakia (1)
- Turkey (2)
- United States (2)

== Results ==
=== Ranking round ===
Qualified for 1/8 Round
Qualified for 1/16 Round

Rank	Archer	Nation	Score	10s	Xs
1	Mike Schloesser	Netherlands	715	67	43
2	Mathias Fullerton	Denmark	714	66	37
3	Nico Wiener	Austria	713	65	36
4	Nicolas Girard	France	712	64	43
5	Abhishek Verma	India	710	62	30
6	Curtis Broadnax	United States	709	62	26
7	Marco Bruno	Italy	709	61	31
8	Jozef Bošanský	Slovakia	709	61	28
9	Shamai Yamrom	Israel	709	61	22
10	Rishabh Yadav	India	707	59	32
11	Hendré Verhoef	South Africa	705	59	23
12	Septimus Cilliers	South Africa	705	57	24
13	Sawyer Sullivan	United States	705	57	24
14	Batuhan Akçaoğlu	Turkey	704	57	22
15	Yağız Sezgin	Turkey	704	56	26
16	Brandon Hawes	Australia	702	55	24
17	Sebastian Garcia Flores	Mexico	702	54	27
18	Aqil Ghazalli	Malaysia	700	52	24
19	Rakesh Kumar	India	699	52	24
20	Daniel Muñoz	Colombia	699	52	19
21	Jean Pizarro	Puerto Rico	698	50	27
22	Ai Xinliang	China	697	52	33
23	Riku van Tonder	New Zealand	697	49	20
24	Lu Zhenhong	China	696	49	16
25	Lee Eun-ho	South Korea	694	46	17
26	Julio Barillas	Guatemala	692	44	21

=== Competition bracket ===
Round of 32; 8 August
17	Garcia Flores (MEX)	149
16	Hawes (AUS)	147
9	Yamrom (ISR)	146
24	Lu (CHN)	142
25	Lee (KOR)	147
8	Bošanský (SVK)	148
21	Pizarro (PUR)	146
12	Cilliers (RSA)	144
13	Sullivan (USA)	150
20	Muñoz (COL)	145
19	Kumar (IND)	146
14	Akçaoğlu (TUR)	147
11	Verhoef (RSA)	149
22	Ai (CHN)	146
7	Bruno (ITA)	147
26	Barillas (GUA)	147
23	Van Tonder (NZL)	147
10	Yadav (IND)	150
15	Sezgin (TUR)	147
18	Ghazalli (MAS)	145

Round of 16; 8 August
1	Schloesser (NED)	147
17	Garcia Flores (MEX)	145
9	Yamrom (ISR)	146
8	Bošanský (SVK)	144
5	Verma (IND)	149
21	Pizarro (PUR)	143
13	Sullivan (USA)	147
4	Girard (FRA)	146
3	Wiener (AUT)	147
14	Akçaoğlu (TUR)	148
11	Verhoef (RSA)	145
6	Broadnax (USA)	145
26	Barillas (GUA)	143
10	Yadav (IND)	147
15	Sezgin (TUR)	146
2	Fullerton (DEN)	145

Quarterfinals; 9 August
1	Schloesser (NED)	147
9	Yamrom (ISR)	147
5	Verma (IND)	148
13	Sullivan (USA)	145
14	Akçaoğlu (TUR)	146
6	Broadnax (USA)	148
10	Yadav (IND)	147
15	Sezgin (TUR)	145

Semi-finals; 9 August
1	Schloesser (NED)	148
5	Verma (IND)	145
6	Broadnax (USA)	147
10	Yadav (IND)	145

Final; 9 August
1	Schloesser (NED)	150
6	Broadnax (USA)	148
Third place 9 August
5	Verma (IND)	147
10	Yadav (IND)	149
