= India at the World Games =

- IOC code: IND
- Medals Ranked 72nd: Gold 1 Silver 2 Bronze 5 Total 8

World Games appearances (overview)
- 1981; 1985; 1989; 1993; 1997; 2001; 2005; 2009; 2013; 2017; 2022; 2025

India is participating in World Games since the 1981 edition. As of 2025 India has won 8 medals including 1 gold, 2 silver and 5 bronze.

== Medal table ==
Games	Gold	Silver	Bronze	Total
(United States) 1981 Santa Clara	0	0	1	1
(United Kingdom) 1985 Londra	0	0	0	0
(Germany) 1989 Karlsruhe	0	1	1	2
(Netherlands) 1993 L'Aia	0	0	0	0
(Finland) 1997 Lahti	0	0	0	0
(Japan) 2001 Akita	0	0	0	0
(Germany) 2005 Duisburg	0	0	0	0
(Chinese Taipei) 2009 Kaohsiung	0	0	0	0
(Colombia) 2013 Cali	1	0	0	1
(Poland) 2017 Wroclaw	0	0	0	0
(United States) 2022 Birmingham	0	0	1	1
(China) 2025 Chengdu	0	1	2	3
Totals (12 entries)	1	2	5	8

== Medals by sport ==
Sport	Gold	Silver	Bronze	Total
Cue sports	1	0	0	1
Powerlifting	0	1	1	2
Wushu	0	1	0	1
Archery	0	0	2	2
Badminton	0	0	1	1
Track speed skating	0	0	1	1
Totals (6 entries)	1	2	5	8

== Medalists ==
Medal	Name	Sport	Event	Year
Bronze	Prakash Padukone	Badminton	Men's singles	1981
Silver	Sumita Laha	Powerlifting	Women's Heavyweight	1989
Bronze	Rekha Mal	Powerlifting	Women's Lightweight	1989
Gold	Aditya Mehta	Snooker	Men's Singles	2013
Bronze	Jyothi Vennam, Abhishek Verma	Archery	Mixed compound team	2022
Bronze	Rishabh Yadav	Archery	Men's individual compound	2025
Silver	Namrata Batra	Wushu	Sanda womens's 52 kg	2025
Bronze	Anandkumar Velkumar	Track speed skating	Men's 1,000 m sprint	2025

== See also ==
- India at the Olympics
- India at the Deaflympics
- India at the Paralympics
- India at the Youth Olympics
- India at the Asian Games
- India at the Asian Para Games
- India at the Asian Youth Games
- India at the Commonwealth Games
- India at the Lusofonia Games
- India at the South Asian Games
