= India at the 2025 World Games =

- IOC code: IND
- NOC: Indian Olympic Association

in Chengdu, China 7 August 2025 – 17 August 2025
- Competitors: 17 (10 men and 7 women) in 5 sports and 19 events
- Medals Ranked 65th: Gold 0 Silver 1 Bronze 2 Total 3

World Games appearances (overview)
- 1981; 1985; 1989; 1993; 1997; 2001; 2005; 2009; 2013; 2017; 2022; 2025

India competed at the 2025 World Games held in Chengdu, China from 7 to 17 August 2025.

Athletes representing India won one silver medal and two bronze medals. The country finished in 65th place in the medal table

== Medalists ==
Medal	Name	Sport	Event	Date
Bronze	Rishabh Yadav	Archery	Men's individual compound	9 August
Silver	Namrata Batra	Wushu	Women's sanda 52 kg	12 August
Bronze	Anandkumar Velkumar	Track speed skating	Men's 1,000 m sprint	15 August

== Competitors ==
The following is the list of number of competitors in the Games.

Sport	Men	Women	Total
Archery	3	2	5
Billards	3	1	4
Racquetball	1	1	2
Road speed skating Track speed skating	2	1	3
Wushu	1	2	3
Total	10	7	17

== Archery ==
Compound – Men

Athlete	Ranking round		Round of 32	Round of 16	Quarterfinal	Semifinal	Final / BM	
Athlete	Score	Seed	Opposition Score	Opposition Score	Opposition Score	Opposition Score	Opposition Score	Rank
Abhishek Verma	710	5	Bye	(Puerto Rico) Pizarro; W149-143	(United States) Sullivan; W148-145	(Netherlands) Schloesser; L145-148	(India) Yadav; L147-149	4
Rishabh Yadav	707	10	(New Zealand) Van Tonder; W150-147	(Guatemala) Barillas; W147-143	(Turkey) Sezgin; W147-145	(United States) Broadnax; L145-147	(India) Verma; W149-147	3rd place, bronze medalist(s)
Rakesh Kumar	699	19	(Turkey) Akçaoğlu; L146-147	did not advance				

Compound – Women

Athlete	Ranking round		Round of 32	Round of 16	Quarterfinal	Semifinal	Final / BM	
Athlete	Score	Seed	Opposition Score	Opposition Score	Opposition Score	Opposition Score	Opposition Score	Rank
Madhura Dhamangaonkar	705	3	Bye	(Iran) Bybordy; W141-136	(Estonia) Jäätma; L145-149	did not advance		
Parneet Kaur	695	12	(South Africa) Van Kradenburg; W144-141	(Mexico) Bernal; W^{10+}145-145^{10}	(Colombia) Usquiano; L140-145	did not advance		

Compound – Mixed team

Athlete	Ranking round		Round of 32	Round of 16	Quarterfinal	Semifinal	Final / BM	
Athlete	Score	Seed	Opposition Score	Opposition Score	Opposition Score	Opposition Score	Opposition Score	Rank
Madhura Dhamangaonkar; Abhishek Verma	1415	1	—N/a	—N/a	(South Korea) South Korea; L151-154	did not advance		

== Billiards ==
Athlete	Event	Round of 16	Quarterfinal	Semifinal	Final / BM	
Athlete	Event	Opposition Result	Opposition Result	Opposition Result	Opposition Result	Rank
Shivam Arora	Heyball	(Sweden) Zarekani; W 5-1	(Hong Kong) Yip; W 5-4	(China) Zhang; L 3-5	(China) Tang; L 4-5	4
Sourav Kothari	Men's 15 reds	—N/a	(China) Xiao; L 0-2	did not advance		
Kamal Chawla	Men's 15 reds	—N/a	—N/a	did not advance		
Natasha Chethan	Women's 6 reds	—N/a	—N/a	did not advance		

== Racquetball ==
Athlete	Event	Round of 16	Quarterfinal	Semifinal	Final / BM	
Athlete	Event	Opposition Result	Opposition Result	Opposition Result	Opposition Result	Rank
Kosetty Jyotheekalyan	Men's singles	(Japan) Kono; L 0-3	did not advance			
Shilpa Dalvi	Women's singles	(Argentina) Vargas Parada; L 0-3	did not advance			
Kosetty Jyotheekalyan; Shilpa Dalvi	Double	(Mexico) Mexico; L 0-3	did not advance			

== Road speed skating ==
Athlete	Event	Heat		Semifinal		Final	
Athlete	Event	Result	Rank	Result	Rank	Result	Rank
Aryanpal Singh Ghuman	Men's 1 lap	33.906	3 Q	34.818	4 FB	35.204	8
Aryanpal Singh Ghuman	Men's 100 m sprint	10.617	3	Did not advance			14
Anandkumar Velkumar	Men's 10,000 m point race	—N/a	—N/a	—N/a	—N/a	16:31.690	12
Anandkumar Velkumar	Men's 15,000 m elimination race	—N/a	—N/a	—N/a	—N/a	—N/a	7

== Track speed skating ==
Athlete	Event	Heat		Semifinal		Final	
Athlete	Event	Result	Rank	Result	Rank	Result	Rank
Aryanpal Singh Ghuman	Men's 200 m time trial	17.818	8 Q	—N/a	—N/a	17.664	4
Aryanpal Singh Ghuman	Men's 500 m sprint	42.758	5	—N/a	—N/a	Did not advance	12
Aryanpal Singh Ghuman	Men's 1,000 m sprint	1:21.434	5 Q	1:20.864	7	Did not advance	11
Anandkumar Velkumar	Men's 5,000 m elimination race	—N/a	—N/a	—N/a	—N/a	7:13.583	11
Anandkumar Velkumar	Men's 1,000 m sprint	1:22.151	3 Q	1:20.355	2 Q	1:22.482	3rd place, bronze medalist(s)
Anandkumar Velkumar	Men's 10,000 m elimination race	—N/a	—N/a	—N/a	—N/a	—N/a	9

== Wushu ==
Athlete	Event	Quarterfinal	Semifinal	Final / BM	
Athlete	Event	Opposition Result	Opposition Result	Opposition Result	Rank
Namrata Batra	Sanda Women's 52 kg	(Lebanon) El Rassi; WBR 2-0	(Philippines) Collado; WBR 2-0	(China) Chen; LBR 0-2	2nd place, silver medalist(s)
Roshibina Devi Naorem	Sanda Women's 60 kg	(China) Li; LBR 1-2	Did not advance		
Abhishek Jamwal	Sanda Men's 56 kg	(Kazakhstan) Karimov; LIS	Did not advance		
