= Bodybuilding at the 2005 World Games – Men's 75 kg =

Bodybuilding men's 75 kg at the World Games
- Venue: TAM Theatre, Duisburg, Germany
- Date: 16–17 July 2005
- Competitors: 7 from 6 nations

Medalists
1st place, gold medalist(s)		Werner Zenk	Germany
2nd place, silver medalist(s)		Igor Kočiš	Slovakia
3rd place, bronze medalist(s)		Corrado Maggiore	Italy

The men's 75 kg event in bodybuilding at the 2005 World Games in Duisburg was played from 16 to 17 July. The bodybuilding competition took place in TAM Theatre.

== Competition format ==
A total of 7 athletes entered the competition. The best five athletes from round 1 advances to the final rounds. Scores from round 1 doesn't count in final rounds.

== Results ==
Rank	Athlete	Nation	Round 1	Round 2	Round 3	Score
1st place, gold medalist(s)	Werner Zenk	Germany	8	7	7	14
2nd place, silver medalist(s)	Igor Kočiš	Slovakia	7	8	12	20
3rd place, bronze medalist(s)	Corrado Maggiore	Italy	20	18	17	35
4	Chan Yun To	Hong Kong	20	20	21	41
5	Michael Metzger	Germany	20	22	20	42
6	Amit Chaudhary	India	32			32
7	Lusi Liga-Liga	Samoa	33			33
