= 2021 Pan American Archery Championships =

- Location: Monterrey, Mexico
- Dates: 22 to 28 March 2021

The 2021 Pan American Archery Championships took place in Monterrey, Mexico, from 22 to 28 March 2021.

== Medal summary ==
=== Recurve ===
Event	Gold	Silver	Bronze
Men's individual	Santiago Arcila; Colombia	Marcus Vinicius D'Almeida; Brazil	Bernardo Oliveira; Brazil
Women's individual	Valentina Vázquez; Mexico	Maira Sepúlveda; Colombia	Ana Paula Vázquez; Mexico
Men's team	Brazil; Marcelo Costa; Marcus Vinicius D'Almeida; Bernardo Oliveira	Colombia; Santiago Arcila; Jorge Enríquez; Daniel Pineda	Mexico; Ángel Alvarado; Luis Álvarez; Carlos Rojas
Women's team	Mexico; Aída Román; Alejandra Valencia; Ana Paula Vázquez	Colombia; Valentina Acosta; Valentina Contreras; Ana Rendón	Brazil; Marina Canetta; Ane Marcelle dos Santos; Ana Machado
Mixed team	Brazil; Ane Marcelle dos Santos; Marcus Vinicius D'Almeida	Colombia; Valentina Contreras; Santiago Arcila	Cuba; Elizabeth Rodríguez; Hugo Franco

=== Compound ===
Event	Gold	Silver	Bronze
Men's individual	Daniel Muñoz; Colombia	Antonio Hidalgo; Mexico	Juan Bonilla; Colombia
Women's individual	Nora Valdez; Colombia	Sara López; Colombia	Alejandra Usquiano; Colombia
Men's team	Colombia; Sebastián Arenas; Juan Bonilla; Daniel Muñoz	El Salvador; Roberto Hernández; Douglas Vladimir Nolasco; Miguel Ángel Veliz	Mexico; Juan del Río; Antonio Hidalgo; Uriel Olvera
Women's team	Colombia; Sara López; Alejandra Usquiano; Nora Valdez	Mexico; Andrea Becerra; Esmeralda Sanchez; Margarita Valencia	Puerto Rico; Marla Cintron; Maria Latorre; Paola María Ramírez
Mixed team	Colombia; Sara López; Juan Bonilla	Mexico; Esmeralda Sánchez; Antonio Hidalgo	El Salvador; Sofía Paiz; Roberto Hernández

=== Medal table ===
* Host nation (Mexico)

Rank	Nation	Gold	Silver	Bronze	Total
1	Colombia	6	5	2	13
2	Mexico*	2	3	3	8
3	Brazil	2	1	2	5
4	El Salvador	0	1	1	2
5	Cuba	0	0	1	1
5	Puerto Rico	0	0	1	1
Totals (6 entries)		10	10	10	30
