= Archery at the 2013 Bolivarian Games =

Archery (Spanish: Tiro con Arco), for the 2013 Bolivarian Games, started on 25 November and ended on 29 November 2013.

== Medal table ==
Rank	Nation	Gold	Silver	Bronze	Total
1	Colombia (COL)	16	6	10	32
2	Venezuela (VEN)	3	11	5	19
3	El Salvador (ESA)	2	1	2	5
4	Guatemala (GUA)	1	1	1	3
5	Chile (CHI)	0	2	2	4
6	Ecuador (ECU)	0	1	1	2
7	Dominican Republic (DOM)	0	0	1	1
Totals (7 entries)		22	22	22	66

== Medal summary ==
=== Men ===
Event	Gold		Silver		Bronze	
Compound 50 m	Roberto Hernández (ESA)	694	Nelson Torres (VEN)	694	Leandro Rojas (VEN)	688
FITA lap recurve	Daniel Pacheco (COL)	n/a	Andrés Pila (COL)	n/a	Elías Malavé (VEN)	n/a
Olympic compound round individual	Leandro Rojas (VEN)	n/a	Camilo Cardona (COL)	n/a	Roberto Hernández (ESA)	n/a
Olympic compound round team	El Salvador; Roberto Hernández; Rigoberto Hernández; Jorge Jiménez	n/a	Venezuela; Nelson Torres; Leandro Rojas; Eduardo Gonzalez	n/a	Colombia; Camilo Cardona; Juan Carrasquilla; Daniel Muñoz	n/a
Olympic recurve round individual	Daniel Pacheco (COL)	1324	Jose Antonio Alvarez (ECU)	1279	Andrés Aguilar (CHI)	1256
Olympic recurve round team	Venezuela; Elías Malavé; David Sánchez; Ricardo Vasquez	n/a	El Salvador; Óscar Guillen; Rafael Castañeda; Cristóbal Merlos	n/a	Colombia; Daniel Pacheco; Andrés Pila; Daniel Pineda	n/a
Recurve 30 m	Daniel Pacheco (COL)	357	Guillermo Aguilar (CHI)	349	Andrés Aguilar (CHI)	347
Recurve 50 m	David Sánchez (VEN)	333	Elías Malavé (VEN)	331	Andrés Pila (COL)	328
Recurve 70 m	Daniel Pacheco (COL)	329	Daniel Pineda (COL)	327	Andrés Pila (COL)	322
Recurve 90 m	Daniel Pacheco (COL)	312	Andrés Aguilar (CHI)	302	Andres Alfonseca (DOM)	300

=== Women ===
Event	Gold		Silver		Bronze	
Compound 50 m	Sara López (COL)	695	Olga Bosch (VEN)	682	Alejandra Usquiano (COL)	681
FITA lap recurve	Ana Rendón (COL)	n/a	Leidys Brito (VEN)	n/a	Maira Sepúlveda (COL)	n/a
Olympic compound round individual	Sara López (COL)	n/a	Alejandra Usquiano (COL)	n/a	Ana Mendoza (VEN)	n/a
Olympic compound round team	Colombia; Sara López; Alejandra Usquiano; Aura Bravo	n/a	Venezuela; Olga Bosch; Jhoaneth Leal; Ana Mendoza	n/a	Ecuador; Alison Priscilla Gonzalez Cedillo; Emilia Monserrath Coronel Ordoñez; Daniela Patricia Paz Coronel	n/a
Olympic recurve round individual	Ana Rendón (COL)	1322	Maira Sepúlveda (COL)	1279	Natalia Sánchez (COL)	1272
Olympic recurve round team	Colombia; Ana Rendón; Maira Sepúlveda; Natalia Sánchez	n/a	Venezuela; Leidys Brito; Mayra Mendez; Genesis Bolivar	n/a	Guatemala; María Ambrocio; Regina Romero; Maria Paiz	n/a
Recurve 30 m	Ana Rendón (COL)	351	Leidys Brito (VEN)	349	Maira Sepúlveda (COL)	346
Recurve 50 m	Ana Rendón (COL)	327	Leidys Brito (VEN)	323	Maira Sepúlveda (COL)	317
Recurve 60 m	Ana Rendón (COL)	337	Leidys Brito (VEN)	326	Natalia Sánchez (COL)	323
Recurve 70 m	Regina Romero (GUA)	308	Ana Rendón (COL)	307	Leidys Brito (VEN)	304

=== Mixed ===
Event	Gold	Silver	Bronze
Olympic compound round mixed	Colombia; Camilo Cardona; Sara López	Venezuela; Nelson Torres; Olga Bosch	El Salvador; Roberto Hernández; Arminda Umanzor
Olympic recurve round mixed	Colombia; Daniel Pacheco; Ana Rendón	Guatemala; Diego Castro; Regina Romero	Venezuela; Elías Malavé; Leidys Brito
