= El Salvador at the 2017 World Games =

- IOC code: ESA
- NOC: El Salvador Olympic Committee
- Website: www.teamesa.org

in Wrocław, Poland 29 July 2017 – 29 July 2017
- Competitors: 1 in 1 sport
- Medals: Gold 0 Silver 0 Bronze 0 Total 0

World Games appearances
- 1981; 1985; 1989; 1993; 1997; 2001; 2005; 2009; 2013; 2017; 2022; 2025

El Salvador competed at the 2017 World Games in Wrocław, Poland El Salvador did not win a medal at the games.

== Competitors ==
Sports	Men	Women	Total	Events
Archery	1	0	1	1
Total	1	0	1	1

== Archery ==
El Salvador had qualified one athlete for the multi-sport event.

Roberto Hernández competed in the men's compound event.
