= India at the 1981 World Games =

- IOC code: IND

in Santa Clara, California, USA 24 July 1981 – 2 August 1981
- Medals: Gold 0 Silver 0 Bronze 1 Total 1

World Games appearances (overview)
- 1981; 1985; 1989; 1993; 1997; 2001; 2005; 2009; 2013; 2017; 2022; 2025

The 1981 World Games were the first World Games and were held in Santa Clara, California in the United States. The games featured sports that were not included in the Olympics.India competed at the 1981 World Games in Santa Clara and won one Bronze medal in Badminton Men's Singles.

== Medalists ==
Medal	Name	Sport	Event
Bronze	Prakash Padukone	Badminton	Men's singles
