= 2025 World Archery Championships – Men's team compound =

Men's team compound at the 2025 World Archery Championships
- Venue: Gwangju International Archery Center
- Location: Gwangju, South Korea
- Dates: 6–7 September
- Competitors: 93 from 31 nations

Medalists
gold medal	Prathamesh Fuge; Aman Saini; Rishabh Yadav	India
silver medal	Jean-Philippe Boulch; François Dubois; Nicolas Girard	France
bronze medal	Aljaž Matija Brenk; Tim Jevšnik; Staš Modic	Slovenia

The men's team compound competition at the 2025 World Archery Championships, which will take place from 6 to 7 September 2025 in Gwangju, South Korea.

== Schedule ==
All times are in Korea Standard Time (UTC+09:00).

Date	Time	Round
Friday, 5 September		Official practice
Saturday, 6 September	09:00; 14:15; 14:45; 15:15; 15:45	Qualification round First Round; Second round Quarterfinals; Semifinals
Sunday, 7 September	14:55; 15:21	Bronze-medal match Gold-medal match

== Qualification round ==
Results after 216 arrows. The top 24 teams qualified to Elimination round.

High green denotes at least one round bye.
Light green denotes entering from first round.

Rank	Nation	Name	Score
1	South Korea	Choi Eun-gyu; Choi Yong-hee; Kim Jong-ho	2129
2	India	Prathamesh Fuge; Aman Saini; Rishabh Yadav	2122
3	Turkey	Batuhan Akçaoğlu; Emircan Haney; Yağız Sezgin	2116
4	Chinese Taipei	Chang Cheng-wei; Chen Chieh-lun; Wu Z-wei	2115
5	France	Jean-Philippe Boulch; François Dubois; Nicolas Girard	2112
6	El Salvador	Roberto Hernández; Douglas Nolasco; Miguel Véliz	2112
7	United States	Curtis Broadnax; James Lutz; Grady Kane	2106
8	Mexico	Sebastián García; Rodrigo González; Elías Reyes Cravioto	2105
9	Slovenia	Aljaž Brenk; Tim Jevšnik; Staš Modic	2104
10	Great Britain	Adam Carpenter; Luke Davis; Ajay Scott	2104
11	Indonesia	Ryan M. Hidayat; Sostar Andaru Rinaldi; Prima Wisnu Wardhana	2101
12	Italy	Elia Fregnan; Michea Godan; Lorenzo Gubbini	2100
13	Netherlands	Mike Schloesser; Jay Tjin-A-Djie; Stef Willems	2095
14	Poland	Rafał Dobrowolski; Przemysław Konecki; Łukasz Przybylski	2095
15	Kazakhstan	Akbarali Karabayev; Dilmukhamet Mussa; Andrey Tyutyun	2095
16	Guatemala	Julio Alfredo Barillas Aragón; José Marcelo del Cid; Pedro Salazar	2091
17	Germany	Paolo Kunsch; Henning Lüpkemann; Noah Nuber	2091
18	Australia	Brandon Hawes; Harry Neve; Bailey Wildman	2081
19	Denmark	Martin Damsbo; Mathias Fullerton; Martin Laursen	2079
20	Vietnam	Dương Duy Bảo; Nguyễn Trọng Hải; Nguyễn Trung Chiến	2079
21	Hungary	Csaba Balogh; Viktor Orosz; László Szijártó	2072
22	Canada	Jordan Adachi; Andrew Fagan; Jean-David Morin	2066
23	Israel	Frank Kfir; Yiftach Hadar; Shamai Yamrom	2061
24	Belgium	Quentin Croes; Mick Fleurinck; Julien Fraipont	2060
25	Sweden	Jacob Benschjöld; Stefan Hansson; Alexander Kullberg	2058
26	Singapore	Erwan Zulfaqar; Eer Jiang Ying; Woon Teng Ng	2049
27	Philippines	Carl Vangeo Datan; Paul Marton De La Cruz; Florante Matan	2039
28	Hong Kong	Lee Hoo Sam Patrick; Ngai Ho Chun Justin; Sze Sing Yu	2010
29	Brazil	Jairo Rodrigo da Silva; Rafael Magalhães Moreira; William Moraes Rego de Souza	2002
30	Faroe Islands	Jógvan Niclasen; Nikkel Petersen; Jóannes Poulsen	1995
31	Mongolia	Unenbat Batchuluun; Enkhsaikhan Buyant; Narmandakh Davaasambuu	1920

== Elimination round ==
1/12 finals
17	Germany	230
16	Guatemala	232
9	Slovenia	230
24	Belgium	223
21	Hungary	226
12	Italy	226
13	Netherlands	218
20	Vietnam	221
19	Denmark	232
14	Poland	227
11	Indonesia	224
22	Canada	223
23	Israel	225
10	Great Britain	231
15	Kazakhstan	228
18	Australia	229

1/8 finals
1	South Korea	234
16	Guatemala	231
9	Slovenia	232
8	Mexico	230
5	France	233
21	Hungary	226
20	Vietnam	222
4	Chinese Taipei	231
3	Turkey	233
19	Denmark	228
11	Indonesia	227
6	El Salvador	229
7	United States	237
10	Great Britain	231
18	Australia	232^{28}
2	India	232^{30}

Quarterfinals
1	South Korea	229
9	Slovenia	230
5	France	236
4	Chinese Taipei	229
3	Turkey	231
6	El Salvador	229
7	United States	233
2	India	234

Semifinals
9	Slovenia	231
5	France	232
3	Turkey	232
2	India	234

Final
5	France	233
2	India	235
Bronze medal
9	Slovenia	233
3	Turkey	232
