= Archery at the 2022 World Games – Men's individual compound =

Men's individual compound at the 2022 World Games
- Venue: Avondale Park Historic District, Birmingham, United States
- Dates: 8–9 July
- Competitors: 25 from 19 nations

Medalists
gold medal	Miguel Becerra	Mexico
silver medal	Jean-Philippe Boulch	France
bronze medal	Christopher Perkins	Canada

The men's individual compound archery competition at the 2022 World Games took place from 8 to 9 July 2022 at the Avondale Park Historic District in Birmingham, United States.

== Competition format ==
A total of 25 athletes entered the competition. Ranking round was held to determine seeding. Athletes competed in single-elimination tournament.

== Results ==
=== Ranking round ===
Rank	Archer	Nation	Score	10s	Xs
1	Mike Schloesser	Netherlands	713	65	38
2	Christopher Perkins	Canada	713	65	25
3	Roberto Hernández	El Salvador	711	63	34
4	Jean-Philippe Boulch	France	710	62	31
5	Jozef Bošanský	Slovakia	709	61	28
6	Miguel Becerra	Mexico	708	60	22
7	Nico Wiener	Austria	707	59	30
8	Robin Jäätma	Estonia	707	59	28
9	Abhishek Verma	India	707	59	27
10	Łukasz Przybylski	Poland	705	58	29
11	Braden Gellenthien	United States	704	56	28
12	Adrien Gontier	France	703	55	24
13	Daniel Muñoz	Colombia	701	54	27
14	Mathias Fullerton	Denmark	701	53	18
15	James Lutz	United States	699	51	25
16	Danie Oosthuizen	Australia	696	51	19
17	Kim Tae-yoon	South Korea	696	50	23
18	Tim Krippendorf	Germany	696	48	24
19	Yun Young-jun	South Korea	695	51	28
20	Aman Saini	India	695	49	21
21	Sergey Khristich	Kazakhstan	694	48	22
22	Riku van Tonder	New Zealand	691	45	15
23	Beyers de Klerk	South Africa	690	45	18
24	Benjamin Thompson	United States	677	37	18
25	Folkers Herholdt	South Africa	669	40	15

=== Competition bracket ===
Round of 32; 8 July
17	Kim (KOR)	144^{9+}
16	Oosthuizen (AUS)	144^{9}
9	Verma (IND)	148
24	Thompson (USA)	140
25	Herholdt (RSA)	142
8	Jäätma (EST)	148
21	Khristich (KAZ)	146
12	Gontier (FRA)	150
13	Muñoz (COL)	142
20	Saini (IND)	147
19	Yun (KOR)	145
14	Fullerton (DEN)	148
11	Gellenthien (USA)	146
22	Van Tonder (NZL)	143
23	De Klerk (RSA)	142
10	' Przybylski (POL)	149
15	Lutz (USA)	145^{X}
18	Krippendorf (GER)	145^{10}

Round of 16; 8 July
1	Schloesser (NED)	150
17	Kim (KOR)	146
9	Verma (IND)	149
8	Jäätma (EST)	148
5	Bošanský (SVK)	147
12	Gontier (FRA)	146
20	Saini (IND)	145
4	Boulch (FRA)	148
3	Hernández (ESA)	147
14	Fullerton (DEN)	146
11	Gellenthien (USA)	147^{10}
6	Becerra (MEX)	147^{X}
7	Wiener (AUT)	146
10	Przybylski (POL)	150
15	Lutz (USA)	146
2	Perkins (CAN)	148

Quarterfinals; 8 July
1	Schloesser (NED)	149^{10}
9	Verma (IND)	149^{10+}
5	Bošanský (SVK)	145
4	Boulch (FRA)	147
3	Hernández (ESA)	148
6	Becerra (MEX)	149
10	Przybylski (POL)	145
2	Perkins (CAN)	148

Semi-finals; 9 July
9	Verma (IND)	141
4	' Boulch (FRA)	143
6	Becerra (MEX)	147
2	Perkins (CAN)	145

Final; 9 July
4	Boulch (FRA)	146
6	Becerra (MEX)	147
Third place 9 July
9	Verma (IND)	145
2	Perkins (CAN)	148
