= India at the 2005 World Games =

Sporting event delegation

- IOC code: IND

in Duisburg, Germany 14 July 2005 – 24 July 2005
- Competitors: 2
- Medals: Gold 0 Silver 0 Bronze 0 Total 0

World Games appearances (overview)
- 1981; 1985; 1989; 1993; 1997; 2001; 2005; 2009; 2013; 2017; 2022; 2025

India participated in World Games 2005 in Duisburg, Germany. The nation sent the smallest contingent out of any participating nation, with only two athletes going. No medals were won.

== Athletes ==
Name	Sport
Pankaj Advani	Billiards
Amit Chaudhary	Bodybuilding - 75 kg
