= Sumita Laha =

Indian powerlifter (1964–1994)

Personal information
- National team: India
- Born: Begampur, India
- Home town: Kolkata, India

Sport
- Country: India
- Sport: Powerlifting

Sumita Laha (born Sumita Laha; 1964 ) was an Indian powerlifter. She made history in the 1980s by becoming the only Indian woman to win two medals at the IPF Powerlifting World Championships (1984 and 1986) and setting a historic world record in the squat (227.5 kg) in 1989. She won silver at the 1989 World Games in Women's Heavyweight of Powerlifting.

== Honours and awards ==
=== Major International Medals & Awards ===
- Silver Medal (1989 World Games) : Won in powerlifting at the World Games in Karlsruhe, marking a historic podium finish for India.
- Silver Medal (1986 IPF Women's World Championships) : Claimed second place globally in her weight class under the International Powerlifting Federation (IPF).
- Bronze Medal (1984 IPF Women's World Championships) : Secured her first major international podium finish.

=== World Records & National Feats ===
- World Record Squat (1989) : Set a historic world record in the squat by lifting 227.5 kg at the 7th National Powerlifting Championship.
- National Championships : Multiple-time Indian national gold medalist and titleholder.

=== Lifetime Achievement & Corporate Awards ===
- CSJC Lifetime Achievement Award (2016) : Converted by the Calcutta Sports Journalists' Club for her legendary contributions to Indian strength sports.
- Strong Woman of Coal India : Honored as a premier veteran lifter representing Coal India Headquarters.
