= India at the 1989 World Games =

- IOC code: IND

in Karlsruhe, Germany 20 July 1989 – 30 July 1989
- Medals: Gold 0 Silver 1 Bronze 1 Total 2

World Games appearances (overview)
- 1981; 1985; 1989; 1993; 1997; 2001; 2005; 2009; 2013; 2017; 2022; 2025

India competed at the 1989 World Games held in Karlsruhe, Germany, and won two medals: one Silver and one Bronze. They were both in Women's Powerlifting.

== Medalists ==
Medal	Name	Sport	Event
Silver	Sumita Laha	Powerlifting	Women's Heavyweight
Bronze	Rekha Mal	Powerlifting	Women's Lightweight
