= India at the 2013 World Games =

- IOC code: IND

in Cali, Colombia 25 July 2013 – 4 August 2013
- Medals: Gold 1 Silver 1 Bronze 0 Total 2

World Games appearances (overview)
- 1981; 1985; 1989; 1993; 1997; 2001; 2005; 2009; 2013; 2017; 2022; 2025

India competed at the 2013 World Games in Cali, Colombia, from 25 July to 4 August 2013. A total of 10 athletes competed. India won one gold medal, its first ever, in Snooker.) The country also won one silver medal in invitational sports (Wushu).

== Medalists ==
Medal	Name	Sport	Event	Status
Gold	Aditya Mehta	Snooker	Men's Singles	Official
Silver	Pooja Kandian	Wushu	Women's Sanda 60 kg	Invitational

== Athletes ==
Name	Sport	Status
Aditya Mehta	Snooker Men's Singles	Gold
Pooja Kandian	Wushu Women's Sanda 60 kg	Silver
Pankaj Advani	Snooker Men's Singles	Quarter-Finals
Ritul Chatterjee	Men's Compound Archery	Quarter-Finals
Rajat Chauhan	Men's Compound Archery	Round of 32
Joshna Chinappa	Women's Squash	Round of 16
Mahesh Mangaonkar	Men's Squash	Round of 16
Varsha Sriramakrishna Puranik	Women's Roller Sports Women	First Round
Harinder Pal Sandhu	Squash Men's	Round of 32
Anup Kumar Yama	Roller Skating Artistic Men's Free Skating	Round of 32
