= Ana Caetano =

Ana Caetano may refer to:

- Ana Caetano (singer), member of the Brazilian musical duo Anavitória
- Ana Luiza Caetano, Brazilian archer
