= Archery at the 2019 Pan American Games – Mixed team compound =

Mixed team compound at the 2019 Pan American Games
- Venue: Villa Maria de Triunfo
- Dates: August 7–10
- Competitors: 16 from 8 nations

Medalists
Gold medal	María Eugenia González; Ivan Nikolajuk; Argentina
Silver medal	Maria Jose Zebadúa; Jose Del Cid Carrillo; Guatemala
Bronze medal	Sara López; Daniel Muñoz; Colombia

The mixed team compound competition of the archery events at the 2019 Pan American Games was held from 7 August to 10 August at the Archery field at the Villa Maria de Triunfo in Lima, Peru.

== Schedule ==
Date	Time	Round
August 7, 2019	8:30	Ranking round
August 10, 2019	11:00	Quarterfinals
August 10, 2019	11:30	Semifinals
August 10, 2019	14:00	Finals

== Results ==
=== Ranking round ===
The results were as follows:

Rank	Nation	Archer	Score	Notes
1	Colombia	Sara López; Daniel Muñoz	1414	PR
2	United States	Paige Pearce; Braden Gellenthien	1407	
3	Mexico	Andrea Maya Becerra; Rodolfo Gonzalez de Alba	1407	
4	Argentina	María Eugenia González; Ivan Nikolajuk	1386	
5	Puerto Rico	Marla Cintron; Jean Pizarro	1378	
6	Brazil	Gisele Esposito Meleti; Bruno Brassaroto	1371	
7	Guatemala	Maria Jose Zebadúa; Jose Del Cid Carrillo	1361	
8	Peru	Beatriz Aliaga; Gonzalo Hermoza	1339	

=== Elimination rounds ===
The results were as follows:

Quarterfinals
1	Sara López (COL); Daniel Muñoz (COL)	154
8	Beatriz Aliaga (PER); Gonzalo Hermoza (PER)	148
5	Marla Cintron (PUR); Jean Pizarro (PUR)	153
4	María Eugenia González (ARG); Ivan Nikolajuk (ARG)	153
3	Andrea Maya Becerra (MEX); Rodolfo Gonzalez de Alba (MEX)	151
6	Gisele Esposito Meleti (BRA); Bruno Brassaroto (BRA)	153
7	Maria Jose Zebadúa (GUA); Jose Del Cid Carrillo (GUA)	156
2	Paige Pearce (USA); Braden Gellenthien (USA)	155

Semifinals
1	Sara López (COL); Daniel Muñoz (COL)	154
4	María Eugenia González (ARG); Ivan Nikolajuk (ARG)	157
6	Gisele Esposito Meleti (BRA); Bruno Brassaroto (BRA)	150
7	Maria Jose Zebadúa (GUA); Jose Del Cid Carrillo (GUA)	150

Final
4	María Eugenia González (ARG); Ivan Nikolajuk (ARG)	153
7	Maria Jose Zebadúa (GUA); Jose Del Cid Carrillo (GUA)	152
Bronze medal match
1	Sara López (COL); Daniel Muñoz (COL)	156
6	Gisele Esposito Meleti (BRA); Bruno Brassaroto (BRA)	149
