= India at the 2017 World Games =

- IOC code: IND
- NOC: Indian Olympic Association

in Wrocław, Poland 20 July 2017 – 30 July 2017
- Competitors: 5 in 4 sports
- Medals: Gold 0 Silver 0 Bronze 0 Total 0

World Games appearances (overview)
- 1981; 1985; 1989; 1993; 1997; 2001; 2005; 2009; 2013; 2017; 2022; 2025

India competed at the 2017 World Games held in Wrocław, Poland, from 20 to 30 July 2017. The Indian delegation consisted of five athletes (one woman and four men). The Indian team failed to win any medal in the Games.

== Competitors ==
Sport	Men	Women	Total
Archery	1	0	1
Billiards	1	0	1
Dancesport	1	1	2
Sumo	1	0	1
Total	4	1	5

== Archery ==
India qualified one athlete for the Games. Abhishek Verma got an entry due to having placed tenth in World Ranking list.

Athlete	Event	Qualification		Round 32	Round 16	Quarterfinals	Semifinal	Final	Rank
Athlete	Event	Score	Rank	Round 32	Round 16	Quarterfinals	Semifinal	Final	Rank
Abhishek Verma	Men's Compound	703	12	(Croatia) Markeš; L 146–147	Did not advance				

== Billiards ==
Athlete	Event	Round 16	Quarterfinal	Semifinal	Final	Rank
Aditya Mehta	Mixed Snooker	(Poland) Filipiak; L 1–3	Did not advance			

== Dancesport ==
Athlete	Event	First Round	Hope Round	Semifinal	Final	Rank
Swapnil Londhe; Tanushree Rakshit	Rock'n'Roll	2.4	7.44	–16.65	Did not qualify	

== Sumo ==
Athlete	Event	Round of 16	Quarterfinal	Semifinal	Repechage	Final	Rank
Jaskanwar Singh	Middleweight	Did not start					
Jaskanwar Singh	Openweight	Did not start					
