= Archery at the 2022 World Games – Mixed team compound =

Mixed team compound at the 2022 World Games
- Venue: Avondale Park Historic District, Birmingham, United States
- Dates: 8–9 July
- Competitors: 20 from 10 nations
- Teams: 10

Medalists
gold medal	Sara López; Daniel Muñoz	Colombia
silver medal	Jody Beckers; Mike Schloesser	Netherlands
bronze medal	Jyothi Surekha Vennam; Abhishek Verma	India

The mixed team compound archery competition at the 2022 World Games took place from 8 to 9 July 2022 at the Avondale Park Historic District in Birmingham, United States.

== Results ==
=== Qualification round ===
Rank	Archer	Nation	Score	10s	Xs
1	Jyothi Surekha Vennam; Abhishek Verma	India	1409	113	54
2	Tanja Gellenthien; Mathias Fullerton	Denmark	1409	113	44
3	Linda Ochoa-Anderson; Braden Gellenthien	United States	1408	115	49
4	Sofía Paiz; Roberto Hernández	El Salvador	1407	113	56
5	Sara López; Daniel Muñoz	Colombia	1407	112	56
6	Jody Beckers; Mike Schloesser	Netherlands	1404	110	57
7	Andrea Becerra; Miguel Becerra	Mexico	1391	100	44
8	Elizabeth Randle; Riku van Tonder	New Zealand	1390	98	35
9	Sim Soo-in; Kim Tae-yoon	South Korea	1381	91	42
10	Jeanine van Kradenburg; Beyers de Klerk	South Africa	1380	89	30

=== Elimination round ===
Quarter-finals
1 India	156
8 New Zealand	155
5 Colombia	155
4 El Salvador	153
3 United States	154
6 Netherlands	158
7 Mexico	158^{20+}
2 Denmark	158^{20}

Semi-finals
1 India	157
5 Colombia	159
6 Netherlands	157
7 Mexico	156

Gold medal match
5 Colombia	154^{20}
6 Netherlands	154^{19}
Bronze medal match
1 India	157
7 Mexico	156
