= Estonia at the 2022 World Games =

Estonia at the World Games 2022
- IOC code: EST

in Birmingham, United States 7 July 2022 – 17 July 2022
- Competitors: 8
- Medals: Gold 0 Silver 0 Bronze 0 Total 0

World Games appearances
- 1981; 1985; 1989; 1993; 1997; 2001; 2005; 2009; 2013; 2017; 2022

Estonia competed at the World Games 2022 in Birmingham, United States, from 7 July 2022 to 17 July 2022.

== Competitors ==
The following is the list of number of Estonian competitors in the Games.

Sport	Men	Women	Total	Events
Archery	1	0	1	2
Dance sports	1	1	2	1
Orienteering	2	2	4	5
Sumo	0	1	1	2
Total	4	4	8	10

== Archery ==
Estonia competed in archery.

Athlete	Event	Ranking round		Round of 32	Round of 16	Quarterfinals	Semi-finals	Final / BM	Rank
Athlete	Event	Score	Seed	Opposition Result	Opposition Result	Opposition Result	Opposition Result	Opposition Result	Rank
Robin Jäätma	Men's compound	707	8	(South Africa) Folkers Herholdt; W 148–142	(India) Abhishek Verma; L 148–149	Did not advance			9

== Dance sport ==
Estonia competed in dance sport.

- Standard dance – Ilia Rotar/Silvia Susanne Barjabin

== Orienteering ==
Estonia competed in orienteering.

- Hannula-Katrin Pandis
- Sergei Rjabõškin
- Sigrid Ruul
- Timo Sild
- Men's sprint
- Men's middle distance
- Women's sprint
- Women's middle distance
- Mixed sprint relay

== Sumo ==
Estonia competed in sumo.

Athlete	Event	Round of 64	Round of 32	Round of 16	Quarterfinals	Semi-finals	Repechages	Final / BM	Rank
Athlete	Event	Opposition Result	Opposition Result	Opposition Result	Opposition Result	Opposition Result	Opposition Result	Opposition Result	Rank
Eva-Maria Raudsepp	Women's lightweight	—		(Poland) Lena Andrzejak; L	Did not advance				
Eva-Maria Raudsepp	Women's openweight	(Venezuela) Esmeralda Cedeno; W	(Germany) Anika Schulze; W	(Japan) Hiyori Kon; L	Did not advance		(Norway) Pernille Rojahn Oddlien; L	Did not advance	
