= François Dubois (archer) =

French archer (born 2004)

Personal information
- Born: 26 November 2004 (age 21)

Sport
- Sport: Archery
- Event: Compound
Medal record
Men's compound archery
Representing France
World Championships
Silver medal – second place	2025 Gwangju	Team
European Championships
Gold medal – first place	2026 Antalya	Team
European Indoor Championships
Gold medal – first place	2026 Plovdiv	Team

François Dubois (born 26 November 2004) is a French compound archer.

== Career ==
In September 2025, Dubois competed at the 2025 World Archery Championships and won a silver medal in the men's team compound event, along with Jean-Philippe Boulch and Nicolas Girard.

In May 2026, he competed at the 2026 European Archery Championships and won a gold medal in the team compound event. This was France's first gold medal in the event since 2012.
