= Archery at the 2018 South American Games =

- Venue: Complejo Aurora
- Dates: 2–6 June
- Nations: 9

There were 10 archery events at the 2018 South American Games in Cochabamba, Bolivia. Four for men and women and two mixes. The events were held between June 2 and 6 at the Complejo Aurora.

== Medal summary ==
=== Medal table ===
* Host nation (Bolivia)

Rank	Nation	Gold	Silver	Bronze	Total
1	Colombia	7	3	2	12
2	Brazil	2	2	0	4
3	Argentina	1	0	3	4
4	Venezuela	0	4	3	7
5	Chile	0	1	2	3
Totals (5 entries)		10	10	10	30

=== Medalists ===
==== Recurve ====
Event	Gold	Silver	Bronze
Men's individual	Daniel Pineda (COL)	Ricardo Soto (CHI)	Estiven Ramírez (COL)
Women's individual	Graziela dos Santos (BRA)	Ana Clara Machado (BRA)	Mayra Mendez (VEN)
Men's team	Colombia; Daniel Pineda; Estiven Ramírez; Andrés Pila	Brazil; Edson Kim; Gustavo dos Santos; Lugui da Cruz	Argentina; Ignacio Ariel; Kevin Sabado; Mario Jajarabilla
Women's team	Brazil; Ana Clara Machado; Graziela dos Santos; Ana Luiza Caetano	Colombia; Ana Rendón; Maira Sepúlveda; Valentina Contreras	Venezuela; Mayra Mendez; Verona Villegas; Yerubi Suarez
Mixed team	Argentina; Florencia Leithold; Kevin Sabado	Venezuela; Mayra Mendez; Elías Malavé	Colombia; Ana Rendón; Daniel Pineda

=== Compound ===
Event	Gold	Silver	Bronze
Men's individual	Camilo Cardona (COL)	Daniel Muñoz (COL)	Alejandro Martín (CHI)
Women's individual	Sara López (COL)	Nora Valdez (COL)	Ana Mendoza (VEN)
Men's team	Colombia; Daniel Muñoz; Camilo Cardona; Sebastián Arenas	Venezuela; Maico Gómez; Eduardo González; Nelson Torres	Argentina; Walter Sabado; Nelson Salinas; Pablo Maio
Women's team	Colombia; Sara López; Alejandra Usquiano; Nora Valdez	Venezuela; Ana Mendoza; Olga Bosch; Luzmary Guedez	Argentina; Melissa Regnasco; María González; Cynthia Mitchell
Mixed team	Colombia; Sara López; Camilo Cardona	Venezuela; Luzmary Guedez; Nelson Torres	Chile; Fernanda Lagos; Alejandro Martin
