= Archery at the 2010 South American Games – Men's compound over all distances =

The Men's compound overall event at the 2010 South American Games summed the four distances contested over March 20 and 21, and served as the qualifying order for the individual event.

== Medalists ==
Gold	Silver	Bronze
Roberval dos Santos; Brazil	Nelson Eduardo Torres; Venezuela	Daniel Muñoz; Colombia

== Results ==
Rank	Athlete	Series				Score
Rank	Athlete	30m	50m	70m	90m	Score
1st place, gold medalist(s)	Roberval dos Santos (BRA)	360	345	333	330	1368
2nd place, silver medalist(s)	Nelson Eduardo Torres (VEN)	353	342	345	323	1363
3rd place, bronze medalist(s)	Daniel Muñoz (COL)	356	340	340	324	1360
4	Gary Alejandro Hernandez (VEN)	358	341	340	320	1359
5	Claudio Contrucci (BRA)	357	345	336	321	1359
6	Marcelo Roriz Junior (BRA)	357	339	335	326	1357
7	Gabriel Lee Oliferow (VEN)	357	343	334	320	1354
8	Omar Mejía (COL)	358	336	339	320	1353
9	Guillermo Omar Contreras (CHI)	358	341	334	319	1352
10	Pablo Gustavo Maio (ARG)	354	328	343	320	1345
11	Eduardo Jesus Gonzalez (VEN)	358	341	329	313	1341
12	Nestor Federico Gaute (ARG)	350	331	327	331	1339
13	Juan Pablo Cancino (CHI)	355	335	324	321	1335
14	Gabriel Alejandro Marti (ARG)	357	333	323	316	1329
15	Alberto Sergio Pozzolo (ARG)	356	335	327	310	1328
16	Jose Joaquin Livesey (CHI)	342	326	336	322	1326
17	Guillermo Gimpel (CHI)	355	336	331	298	1320
18	Vilson Tonao (BRA)	349	328	324	306	1307
19	Juan Manuel Arango (COL)	352	330	315	304	1301
20	José Ospina (COL)	349	324	318	275	1266
