= 2012 Classic Powerlifting World Championships =

Powerlifting event in Stockholm, Sweden

2012 IPF Classic World Championships
- Location: Stockholm, Sweden
- Dates: 12−17 June

The 2012 Classic Powerlifting World Championships (also called the World Classic Powerlifting Cup) were held in Stockholm, Sweden from 12 to 17 June 2012 featuring 168 athletes across 31 countries.

This was the first edition of the IPF Powerlifting World Championships that was held in classic (raw) format.

== Medal overview ==
=== Men's events ===
Event	Gold		Silver		Bronze	
− 59 kg	Sergey Fedosienko; Russia	651.0 kg	Dariusz Wszoła; Poland	547.5 kg	Eric Kupperstein; United States	540.0 kg
− 66 kg	Tsung-Ting Hsieh; Chinese Taipei	640.0 kg	Yusuke Inoue; Japan	617.5 kg	Mikhail Andryukhin; Russia	600.0 kg
− 74 kg	Alexey Bakhirev; Russia	670.0 kg	Sami Nieminen; Finland	650.0 kg	Per Berglund; Sweden	645.0 kg
− 83 kg	Davranbek Turakhanov; Kazakhstan	720.0 kg	Alexey Kuzmin; Russia	715.0 kg	Alex Tertitski; United States	707.5 kg
− 93 kg	Krzysztof Wierzbicki; Poland	765.0 kg	Alexander Karpenko; Russia	757.5 kg	Jiří Horník; Czech Republic	745.0 kg
− 105 kg	Anibal Coimbra; Luxembourg	847.5 kg	Alex-Edward Raus; Estonia	845.0 kg	Dmitriy Likhanov; Russia	830.0 kg
− 120 kg	Mohamed Bouafia; Algeria	915.5 kg	Kamo Simonyan; Russia	865.0 kg	Michael Tuchscherer; United States	865.0 kg
+ 120 kg	Blaine Sumner; United States	907.5 kg	Robin Sjögren; Sweden	860.0 kg	Stephen Pritchard; Australia	855.0 kg

=== Women's events ===
Event	Gold		Silver		Bronze	
− 47 kg	Chen Wei-ling; Chinese Taipei	395.0 kg	Olga Golubeva; Russia	378.5 kg	Mary Macken; Australia	307.5 kg
− 52 kg	Ana Komalaeva; Russia	382.5 kg	Suzanne Hartwig-Gary; United States	372.5 kg	Magdolna Petroczki; Hungary	352.5 kg
− 57 kg	Hui-Chun Wu; Chinese Taipei	397.5 kg	Yulia Vaavilova; Russia	395.0 kg	Helen Engberg; Sweden	375.0 kg
− 63 kg	Kimberly Walford; United States	468.0 kg	Jennifer Thompson; United States	467.5 kg	Landish Gavina; Russia	410.0 kg
− 72 kg	Johanna Kankus; Finland	425.0 kg	Marzena Piter; Poland	412.5 kg	Tatiana Zubkova; Russia	405.0 kg
− 84 kg	Ielja Strik; Netherlands	535.0 kg	Evgenia Dukacheva; Russia	505.0 kg	Josephine Bark; Sweden	422.5 kg
+ 84 kg	Sonia Manaena; New Zealand	515.0 kg	Jenny Sellen; Sweden	437.5 kg	Magdalena Bialek; Poland	412.5 kg

== Medal table ==
* Host nation (Russia)

Rank	Nation	Gold	Silver	Bronze	Total
1	Russia*	3	6	4	13
2	Chinese Taipei	3	0	0	3
3	United States	2	2	3	7
4	Poland	1	2	1	4
5	Finland	1	1	0	2
6	Algeria	1	0	0	1
6	Kazakhstan	1	0	0	1
6	Luxembourg	1	0	0	1
6	Netherlands	1	0	0	1
6	New Zealand	1	0	0	1
11	Sweden	0	2	3	5
12	Estonia	0	1	0	1
12	Japan	0	1	0	1
14	Australia	0	0	2	2
15	Czech Republic	0	0	1	1
15	Hungary	0	0	1	1
Totals (16 entries)		15	15	15	45
