= Paraguay at the 2025 World Games =

- IOC code: PAR
- NOC: Paraguayan Olympic Committee

in Chengdu, China 7 August 2025 – 17 August 2025
- Competitors: 1 (1 man and 0 women) in 1 sport and 5 events
- Medals Ranked 46th: Gold 1 Silver 1 Bronze 0 Total 2

World Games appearances
- 1981; 1985; 1989; 1993; 1997; 2001; 2005; 2009; 2013; 2017; 2022; 2025

Paraguay competed at the 2025 World Games held in Chengdu, China from 7 to 17 August 2025.

The only athlete to represent Paraguay, Julio Mirena, won the nation's first World Games medal in history. He won a gold medal in road speed skating and a silver medal in track speed skating. The country finished in 46th place in the medal table.

== Medalists ==
Medal	Name	Sport	Event	Date
Gold	Julio Mirena	Track speed skating	Men's point race 5,000 metre	14 August
Silver	Julio Mirena	Road speed skating	Men's point race 10,000 metre	12 August

== Competitors ==
The following is the list of number of competitors in the Games.

Sport	Men	Women	Total
Road speed skating	1	0	1
Total	1	0	11
