= Prathamesh Fuge =

Indian compound archer (born 2002)

Personal information
- Full name: Prathamesh Bhalchandra Fuge
- Born: 28 December 2002 (age 23) Pimpri, Maharashtra, India

Sport
- Sport: Archery
- Event: Compound
Medal record
Men's compound archery
Representing India
World Championships
Gold medal – first place	2025 Gwangju	Team
Asian Championships
Silver medal – second place	2025 Dhaka	Team
Bronze medal – third place	2023 Bangkok	Team

Prathamesh Bhalchandra Fuge (born 28 December 2002) is an Indian compound archer. He won the gold medal in the men's compound team event at the 2025 World Archery Championships.

== Career ==
In November 2023, Fuge competed at the 2023 Asian Archery Championships and won a bronze medal in the men's team event. In April 2024, during stage 1 of the 2024 Archery World Cup, he helped India win gold in the men's compound team event. The Indian team was just one point short of the world record score posted by the United States at the 2011 Archery World Cup. In October 2024, during the World Cup final, he lost in the semifinal of the individual compound event to Mathias Fullerton after a shoot-off. He then lost to Mike Schloesser during the bronze medal playoff.

In September 2025, he competed at the 2025 World Archery Championships and won a gold medal in the men's team event. This was India's first gold medal in compound archery at the World Archery Championships. He also competed in the individual event and advanced to the quarterfinals.
