= Archery at the 2019 Pan American Games – Men's individual compound =

Men's individual compound at the 2019 Pan American Games
- Venue: Villa Maria de Triunfo
- Dates: August 7–10
- Competitors: 10 from 10 nations

Medalists
Gold medal	Roberto Hernández; El Salvador
Silver medal	Braden Gellenthien; United States
Bronze medal	Daniel Muñoz; Colombia

The men's individual compound competition of the archery events at the 2019 Pan American Games was held from 7 August to 10 August at the Archery field at the Villa Maria de Triunfo in Lima, Peru.

== Schedule ==
Date	Time	Round
August 7, 2019	11:30	Ranking round
August 9, 2019	13:30	1/8 elimination
August 9, 2019	14:10	Quarterfinals
August 9, 2019	15:18	Semifinals
August 10, 2019	15:18	Finals

== Results ==
=== Ranking round ===
The results were as follows:

Rank	Archer	Nation	Score	Notes
1	Braden Gellenthien	United States	712	PR
2	Rodolfo Gonzalez de Alba	Mexico	710	
3	Roberto Hernández	El Salvador	708	
4	Daniel Muñoz	Colombia	706	
5	Ivan Nikolajuk	Argentina	704	
6	Bruno Brassaroto	Brazil	698	
7	Jean Pizarro	Puerto Rico	693	
8	Jose Del Cid Carrillo	Guatemala	689	
9	Mateo Oleas	Ecuador	677	
10	Gonzalo Hermoza	Peru	664	

=== Elimination rounds ===
The results were as follows:

Round of 16
9	Mateo Oleas (ECU)	139
8	Jose Del Cid Carrillo (GUA)	142
7	Jean Pizarro (PUR)	146
10	Gonzalo Hermoza (PER)	138

Quarterfinals
1	Braden Gellenthien (USA)	149
8	Jose Del Cid Carrillo (GUA)	146
5	Ivan Nikolajuk (ARG)	144
4	Daniel Muñoz (COL)	148
3	Roberto Hernández (ESA)	148
6	Bruno Brassaroto (BRA)	143
7	Jean Pizarro (PUR)	143
2	Rodolfo Gonzalez de Alba (MEX)	144

Semifinals
1	Braden Gellenthien (USA)	145
4	Daniel Muñoz (COL)	144
3	Roberto Hernández (ESA)	146
2	Rodolfo Gonzalez de Alba (MEX)	145

Final
1	Braden Gellenthien (USA)	146
3	Roberto Hernández (ESA)	147
Bronze medal match
4	Daniel Muñoz (COL)	149
2	Rodolfo Gonzalez de Alba (MEX)	144
