= Archery at the 2022 South American Games =

Archery competitions at the 2022 South American Games

- Venue: Archery National Center
- Dates: October 2−5
- Nations: 12

Archery competitions at the 2022 South American Games in Asunción, Paraguay were held between October 2 and 5 at the Archery National Center.

A total of 10 events were contested (four men's, four women's and two mixed). A total of 12 NOC's entered teams into one or both competitions. The gold medalists in each individual event qualified a quota spot for the 2023 Pan American Games archery competitions.

== Medal summary ==
=== Medal table ===
* Host nation (Paraguay)

Rank	Nation	Gold	Silver	Bronze	Total
1	Colombia	6	4	2	12
2	Brazil	3	6	1	10
3	Argentina	1	0	0	1
4	Chile	0	0	5	5
5	Ecuador	0	0	1	1
5	Venezuela	0	0	1	1
Totals (6 entries)		10	10	10	30

=== Medalists ===
==== Men ====
Event	Gold	Silver	Bronze
Individual recurve	Jorge Enríquez (COL)	Marcus D'Almeida (BRA)	Andrés Pila (COL)
Individual compound	Ivan Nikolajuk (ARG)	Roberval dos Santos (BRA)	Alejandro Martín (CHI)
Team recurve	Brazil; Marcus D'Almeida; Matheus Gomes; Matheus Ely	Colombia; Andrés Pila; Daniel Pineda; Jorge Enríquez	Venezuela; Kevin Pérez; Luis Vivas; Victor Palacio
Team compound	Colombia; Pablo Gómez; Daniel Muñoz; Jagdeep Singh	Brazil; Luccas de Abreu; Roberval dos Santos; Rafael Kawakani	Chile; Agustín Infante; Alejandro Martín; Fabián Seymour

==== Women ====
Event	Gold	Silver	Bronze
Individual recurve	Ane Marcelle dos Santos (BRA)	Valentina Contreras (COL)	Ana Luiza Caetano (BRA)
Individual compound	Sara López (COL)	María Suárez (COL)	Alejandra Usquiano (COL)
Team recurve	Brazil; Ana Clara Machado; Ana Luiza Caetano; Ane Marcelle dos Santos	Colombia; Ana Rendón; Mariana Ospina; Valentina Contreras	Chile; Gabriela Anabalón; Gabriella Abalde; Javiera Andrades
Team compound	Colombia; Alejandra Usquiano; María Suárez; Sara López	Brazil; Alexandra Silva; Eiry Nisi; Larissa Oliveira	Ecuador; Blanca Rodrigo; Dana Navarrete; Mia Navarrete

==== Mixed ====
Event	Gold	Silver	Bronze
Team recurve	Colombia; Jorge Enríquez; Ana Rendón	Brazil; Marcus D'Almeida; Ane Marcelle dos Santos	Chile; Ricardo Soto; Javiera Andrades
Team compound	Colombia; Jagdeep Singh; Sara López	Brazil; Luccas de Abreu; Eiry Nisi	Chile; Alejandro Martín; Mariana Zúñiga

== Results ==
=== Men's Individual Recurve ===
Round of 32
17	(Uruguay) Federico Schinca	2
16	(Ecuador) Lester Ortegon	6
9	(Peru) Santiago Prado	6
24	(Paraguay) José Centurion	0
25	(Bolivia) Carlos Calderón	0
8	(Chile) Tomás Peña	6
21	(Curaçao) Martijn Schoon	6
12	(Argentina) Ignacio Escalante	5
13	(Venezuela) Kevin Pérez	7
20	(Peru) Bruno López	1
19	(Argentina) Luciano Villoslada	2
14	(Brazil) Matheus Quintanlha	6
11	(Venezuela) Luis Vivas	6
22	(Paraguay) Carlos Rodríguez	0
23	(Paraguay) Rodney Martínez	0
10	(Chile) Andrés Aguilar	6
15	(Peru) Daniel Velarde	2
18	(Venezuela) Víctor Palacio	6

Round of 16
1	(Brazil) Marcus D'Almeida	6
16	(Ecuador) Lester Ortegon	0
9	(Peru) Santiago Prado	1
8	(Chile) Tomás Peña	7
5	(Colombia) Andrés Pila	6
21	(Curaçao) Martijn Schoon	0
13	(Venezuela) Kevin Pérez	0
4	(Brazil) Matheus Zwick	6
3	(Colombia) Daniel Pineda	3
19	(Brazil) Matheus Quintanlha	6
11	(Venezuela) Luis Vivas	3
6	(Chile) Ricardo Soto	7
7	(Argentina) Mario Jajarabilla	7
10	(Chile) Andrés Aguilar	3
18	(Venezuela) Víctor Palacio	4
2	(Colombia) Jorge Enríquez	6

Quarterfinals
1	(Brazil) Marcus D'Almeida	6
8	(Chile) Tomás Peña	0
5	(Colombia) Andrés Pila	6
4	(Brazil) Matheus Zwick	2
14	(Brazil) Matheus Quintanlha	6
6	(Chile) Ricardo Soto	5
7	(Argentina) Mario Jajarabilla	2
2	(Colombia) Jorge Enríquez	6

Semifinals
1	(Brazil) Marcus D'Almeida	7
5	(Colombia) Andrés Pila	1
14	(Brazil) Matheus Quintanlha	0
2	(Colombia) Jorge Enríquez	6

Finals
2	(Colombia) Jorge Enríquez	6
1	(Brazil) Marcus D'Almeida	2
Third place
5	(Colombia) Andrés Pila	7
14	(Brazil) Matheus Quintanlha	3

=== Men's Individual Compound ===
Round of 32
17	(Ecuador) Mateo Peña	141
16	(Uruguay) Adrián Vilas	138
21	(Ecuador) Josepth García	140
12	(Argentina) Federico Salvetti	135
13	(Peru) Ángel Bueno	143
20	(Peru) Joaquín Pérez	135
19	(Peru) Marcos Rey	137
14	(Chile) Fabián Seymour	142
11	(Chile) Agustín Infante	142
22	(Paraguay) César Britez	139
23	(Paraguay) Santiago Morel	132
10	(Chile) Alejandro Martín	144
15	(Bolivia) Luis Araujo	144
18	(Paraguay) Julio Barboza	138

Round of 16
1	(Colombia) Jagdeep Singh	144
17	(Ecuador) Mateo Peña	128
9	(Brazil) Rafael Kawakani	142
8	(Argentina) Nelson Salinas	144
5	(Argentina) Ivan Nikolajuk	145
21	(Ecuador) Josepth García	135
13	(Peru) Ángel Bueno	142
4	(Brazil) Luccas Abreu	145
3	(Colombia) Daniel Muñoz	147
14	(Chile) Fabián Seymour	140
11	(Chile) Agustín Infante	138
6	(Brazil) Roverval Dos Santos	141
7	(Ecuador) Mateo Oleas	141
10	(Chile) Alejandro Martín	142
15	(Bolivia) Luis Araujo	139
2	(Colombia) Pablo Gómez	144

Quarterfinals
1	(Colombia) Jagdeep Singh	142
8	(Argentina) Nelson Salinas	144
5	(Argentina) Ivan Nikolajuk	143
4	(Brazil) Luccas Abreu	142
3	(Colombia) Daniel Muñoz	143
6	(Brazil) Roberval Dos Santos	144
10	(Chile) Alejandro Martín	144
2	(Colombia) Pablo Gómez	144

Semifinals
8	(Argentina) Nelson Salinas	141
5	(Argentina) Ivan Nikolajuk	144
6	(Brazil) Roberval Dos Santos	144
10	(Chile) Alejandro Martín	141

Finals
5	(Argentina) Ivan Nikolajuk	139
6	(Brazil) Roberval Dos Santos	134
Third place
8	(Argentina) Nelson Salinas	139
10	(Chile) Alejandro Martín	141

=== Men's Team Recurve ===
Quarterfinals
Venezuela	5
Argentina	4
Chile	6
Peru	0
Paraguay	0
Brazil	6

Semifinals
Colombia	5
Venezuela	4
Chile	0
Brazil	6

Final
Colombia	3
Brazil	5
Bronze medal match
Venezuela	5
Chile	3

=== Men's Team Compound ===
Quarterfinals
Ecuador	215
Chile	223
Argentina	223
Peru	217
Paraguay	203
Brazil	226

Semifinals
Colombia	231
Chile	222
Argentina	222
Brazil	223

Final
Colombia	232
Brazil	227
Bronze medal match
Chile	223(29)
Argentina	223(27)

=== Women's Individual Recurve ===
Round of 32
17	(Peru) Pamela Velásquez	5
15	(Bolivia) Mayte Paredes	6
15	(Ecuador) Adriana Espinoza	2
18	(Paraguay) Ivonne Villalba	6

Round of 16
1	(Colombia) Ana Rendón	6
15	(Bolivia) Mayte Paredes	0
9	(Venezuela) Mayra Mendez	0
8	(Brazil) Ana Dias de Carvalho	6
5	(Colombia) Mariana Ospina	6
12	(Peru) Gianella Hermoza	0
13	(Peru) Alexandra Zavala	2
3	(Colombia) Valentina Contreras	6
3	(Brazil) Ana Luiza Caetano	6
14	(Paraguay) Valeria Rojas	0
11	(Chile) Gabriela Anabalón	0
6	(Argentina) Florencia Leithold	6
7	(Chile) Javiera Andrades	6
10	(Chile) Gabriella Abalde	2
18	(Paraguay) Ivonne Villalba	2
2	(Brazil) Ane Marcelle dos Santos	6

Quarterfinals
1	(Colombia) Ana Rendón	6
8	(Brazil) Ana Dias de Carvalho	2
5	(Colombia) Mariana Ospina	1
3	(Colombia) Valentina Contreras	7
3	(Brazil) Ana Luiza Caetano	6
6	(Argentina) Florencia Leithold	2
7	(Chile) Javiera Andrades	3
2	(Brazil) Ane Marcelle Dos Santos	7

Semifinals
1	(Colombia) Ana Rendón	2
3	(Colombia) Valentina Contreras	6
3	(Brazil) Ana Luiza Caetano	5
2	(Brazil) Ane Marcelle Dos Santos	6

Finals
3	(Colombia) Valentina Contreras	1
2	(Brazil) Ane Marcelle Dos Santos	7
Third place
1	(Colombia) Ana Rendón	0
3	(Brazil) Ana Luiza Caetano	6

=== Women's Individual Compound ===
Round of 32
17	(Venezuela) Olga Bosch	132
16	(Chile) Camila Celis	135
13	(Peru) Beatriz Aliaga	140
20	(Peru) Violeta Escobedo	123
19	(Peru) Milagros Trujillo	121
14	(Chile) Bernardita Biava	138
15	(Ecuador) Dana Navarrete	132
18	(Bolivia) Gisela Mollinedo	125

Round of 16
1	(Colombia) Sara López	141
16	(Chile) Camila Celis	118
9	(Ecuador) Blanca Rodrigo	138
8	(Venezuela) Ana Gabriela Mendoza	142
5	(Argentina) María Eugenia González	140
12	(Brazil) Alexandra de Cassia Silva	142
13	(Peru) Beatriz Aliaga	129
4	(Brazil) Eiry Snak Nisi	139
3	(Colombia) María Suárez	140
14	(Chile) Bernardita Biava	135
11	(Brazil) Larissa Ferrari Oliveira	145
6	(Chile) Mariana Zúñiga	144
7	(Panama) Astrid Barria	140
10	(Ecuador) Mia Navarrete	147
15	(Ecuador) Dana Navarrete	138
2	(Colombia) Alejandra Usquiano	142

Quarterfinals
1	(Colombia) Sara López	144
8	(Venezuela) Ana Gabriela Mendoza	135
12	(Brazil) Alexandra de Cassia Silva	140
4	(Brazil) Eiry Snak Nisi	143
3	(Colombia) María Suárez	143
11	(Brazil) Larissa Ferrari Oliveira	139
10	(Ecuador) Mia Navarrete	134
2	(Colombia) Alejandra Usquiano	144

Semifinals
1	(Colombia) Sara López	148
4	(Brazil) Eiry Snak Nisi	136
3	(Colombia) María Suárez	144
2	(Colombia) Alejandra Usquiano	143

Finals
1	(Colombia) Sara López	145
3	(Colombia) María Suárez	135
Third place
4	(Brazil) Eiry Snak Nisi	127
2	(Colombia) Alejandra Usquiano	128

=== Women's Team Recurve ===
Semifinals
Colombia	6
Peru	0
Chile	0
Brazil	6

Final
Colombia	3
Brazil	5
Bronze medal match
Peru	2
Chile	6

=== Women's Team Compound ===
Quarterfinals
Peru	215
Chile	208

Semifinals
Colombia	228
Peru	201
Ecuador	217
Brazil	223

Final
Colombia	236
Brazil	216
Bronze medal match
Peru	195
Ecuador	220

=== Mixed Team Recurve ===
Round of 16
Bolivia	6
Paraguay	0

Quarterfinals
Colombia	6
Bolivia	0
Venezuela	0
Chile	6
Argentina	3
Peru	5
Ecuador	0
Brazil	6

Semifinals
Colombia	5
Chile	3
Peru	0
Brazil	6

Final
Colombia	6
Brazil	0
Bronze medal match
Chile	5
Peru	1

=== Mixed Team Compound ===
Quarterfinals
Chile	150
Ecuador	142
Argentina	147
Peru	142
Bolivia	145
Brazil	149

Semifinals
Colombia	155
Chile	146
Argentina	147
Brazil	150

Final
Colombia	155
Brazil	147
Bronze medal match
Chile	154
Argentina	152
