= IPF Powerlifting World Championships =

International event for powerlifting

Powerlifting World Championships
- Status: active
- Genre: sporting event
- Date: mid-year
- Frequency: annual
- Country: varying
- Inaugurated: 1973

The Powerlifting World Championships is the main international event for the powerlifting sport. These are conducted on behalf of the sport's governing body, International Powerlifting Federation (IPF) by an affiliated national federation.

== Organization ==
A world championship is divided in two events - one being a classic (also known as a raw championships) and the other being an equipped championships.

== Championships ==
The first men's World equipped championships were held in 1973, while the first edition of women's championships was held in 1980. Since 2012 there are also held single Classic championships in each of the weights.

=== Seniors Men Equipped ===
Since 1973

Edition	Year	Host City	Host country	Events
IPF Equipped World Championships
1	1973	Harrisburg	United States	9
2	1974	York	United States	10
3	1975	Birmingham	Great Britain	10
4	1976	York	United States	10
5	1977	Perth	Australia	10
6	1978	Turku	Finland	10
7	1979	Dayton	United States	10
8	1980	Arlington	United States	10
9	1981	Calcutta	India	11
10	1982	Munich	Germany	11
11	1983	Gothenburg	Sweden	11
12	1984	Dallas	United States	11
13	1985	Espoo	Finland	11
14	1986	The Hague	Netherlands	11
15	1987	Fredrikstad	Norway	11
16	1988	Perth	Australia	11
17	1989	Sydney	Australia	11
18	1990	Hague	Netherlands	11
19	1991	Örebro	Sweden	11
20	1992	Birmingham	United Kingdom	11
21	1993	Jönköping	Sweden	11
22	1994	Johannesburg	South Africa	11
23	1995	Pori	Finland	11
24	1996	Salzburg	Austria	11
25	1997	Prague	Czech Republic	11
26	1998	Cherkasy	Ukraine	11
27	1999	Trento	Italy	11
28	2000	Akita	Japan	11
29	2001	Sotkamo	Finland	11
30	2002	Trenčín	Slovakia	11
31	2003	Vejle	Denmark	11
32	2004	Cape Town	South Africa	11
33	2005	Miami	United States	11
34	2006	Stavanger	Norway	11
35	2007	Solden	Austria	10
36	2008	St. John's	Canada	10
37	2009	New Delhi	India	10
38	2010	Potchefstroom	South Africa	10
39	2011	Plzeň	Czech Republic	8
40	2012	Aguadilla	Puerto Rico	8
41	2013	Stavanger	Norway	8
42	2014	Aurora	United States	8
43	2015	Luxembourg	Luxembourg	8
44	2016	Orlando	United States	8
45	2017	Plzeň	Czech Republic	8
46	2018	Halmstad	Sweden	8
47	2019	Dubai	United Arab Emirates	8
48	2021	Stavanger	Norway	8
49	2022	Viborg	Denmark	8
50	2023	Druskininkai	Lithuania	8
51	2024	Reykjavík	Iceland	8

=== Seniors Men & Women Classic ===
Edition	Year	Host City	Host country	Events
IPF Classic World Championships
1	2012	Stockholm	Sweden	15
2	2013	Suzdal	Russia	15
3	2014	Potchefstroom	South Africa	8
4	2015	Salo	Finland	8
5	2016	Killeen	United States	8
6	2017	Minsk	Belarus	8
7	2018	Calgary	Canada	8
8	2019	Helsingborg	Sweden	8
9	2021	Halmstad	Sweden	8
10	2022	Sun City	South Africa	8
11	2023	Valletta	Malta	8
12	2024	Druskininkai	Lithuania	8

== See also ==
- List of world championships medalists in powerlifting (men)
- List of world championships medalists in powerlifting (women)
- IPF European Powerlifting Championships
- List of European Championships medalists in powerlifting (men)
- List of European Championships medalists in powerlifting (women)
