= Andrés Pila =

Colombian archer (born 1991)

Personal information
- Full name: Andrés Manuel Pila Solano
- Born: 11 May 1991 (age 35) Montelíbano, Córdoba, Colombia
- Height: 1.74 m (5 ft 9 in)
- Weight: 75 kg (165 lb)

Sport
- Country: Colombia
- Sport: Archery
- Event: Recurve
Medal record
Representing Colombia
Men's recurve archery
Event	1st	2nd	3rd
Pan American Championships	0	1	1
CAC Games	1	0	1
South American Games	1	2	3
Total	2	3	5
Pan American Championships
Silver medal – second place	2022 Santiago	Team
Bronze medal – third place	2018 Medellín	Team
Central American and Caribbean Games
Gold medal – first place	2018 Barranquilla	Team
Bronze medal – third place	2018 Barranquilla	Individual
South American Games
Gold medal – first place	2018 Cochabamba	Team
Silver medal – second place	2014 Santiago	Team
Silver medal – second place	2022 Asunción	Team
Bronze medal – third place	2014 Santiago	Individual
Bronze medal – third place	2014 Santiago	Mixed team
Bronze medal – third place	2022 Asunción	Individual
- Updated on 3 October 2022

Andrés Manuel Pila Solano (born 11 May 1991) is a Colombian competitive archer. A lone male archer on the Colombian team at the 2016 Summer Olympics, Pila has collected a total of four medals throughout his five-year international archery career, including a bronze in the men's individual recurve at the 2014 South American Games in Santiago, Chile.

Pila was selected to compete for Colombia in the men's individual recurve at the 2016 Summer Olympics in Rio de Janeiro, Brazil. Sitting at forty-third position from the initial stage of the competition with 654 points, Pila lost his opening round match to the hard-charging Malaysian and London 2012 quarterfinalist Khairul Anuar Mohamad, who managed to get past him through a comfortable 6–0 challenge.
