= El Salvador at the 2022 World Games =

- IOC code: ESA
- NOC: El Salvador Olympic Committee

in Birmingham, United States 7 July 2022 – 17 July 2022
- Competitors: 2 (1 man and 1 woman) in 1 sport and 3 events
- Medals: Gold 0 Silver 0 Bronze 0 Total 0

World Games appearances
- 1981; 1985; 1989; 1993; 1997; 2001; 2005; 2009; 2013; 2017; 2022

El Salvador competed at the 2022 World Games held in Birmingham, United States from 7 to 17 July 2022. Two competitors represented the country in the sport of archery.

== Competitors ==
The following is the list of number of competitors in the Games.

Sport	Men	Women	Total
Archery	1	1	2
Total	1	1	2

== Archery ==
El Salvador competed in archery.

Athlete	Event	Ranking round		Round of 32	Round of 16	Quarterfinals	Semifinals	Final / BM	
Athlete	Event	Score	Rank	Opposition Result	Opposition Result	Opposition Result	Opposition Result	Opposition Result	Rank
Roberto Hernández	Men's compound	711	3	Bye	(Denmark) Fullerton; W 147–146	(Mexico) Becerra; L 148–149	did not advance		
Sofía Paiz	Women's compound	696	11	(New Zealand) Walker; W 146–134	(India) Vennam; L 143–149	did not advance			
Roberto Hernández; Sofía Paiz	Mixed team compound	1407	4	—		Colombia (COL); L 153–155	did not advance		
