= Track speed skating at the 2025 World Games =

- Venue: Chengdu Roller Sports Centre
- Dates: 14–15 August 2025
- No. of events: 10
- Competitors: 60 from 25 nations

The track speed skating competition at the 2025 World Games took place from 14 to 15 August 2025 at the Chengdu Roller Sports Centre in Chengdu, China. The discipline included ten events (five for men and five for women).

== Qualification ==
A total of fifteen skaters qualified for each event. Aside for the spot designated to the host nation, the remaining fourteen skaters qualified through the 2024 Inline Speed Skating World Championships.

== Participating nations ==
- Austria (1)
- Belgium (2)
- Chile (4)
- China (4)
- Chinese Taipei (3)
- Colombia (4)
- Czech Republic (2)
- Ecuador (4)
- El Salvador (1)
- France (4)
- Germany (4)
- Guatemala (2)
- Hungary (1)
- India (2)
- Italy (4)
- Mexico (2)
- Netherlands (1)
- New Zealand (1)
- Paraguay (1)
- Portugal (2)
- South Korea (2)
- Spain (3)
- Switzerland (2)
- United States (1)
- Venezuela (2)

== Medal table ==
* Host nation (China)

| Rank | Nation | Gold | Silver | Bronze | Total |
|---|---|---|---|---|---|
| 1 | Colombia | 4 | 3 | 1 | 8 |
| 2 | Spain | 3 | 0 | 0 | 3 |
| 3 | Ecuador | 1 | 1 | 0 | 2 |
| 4 | Belgium | 1 | 0 | 2 | 3 |
| 5 | El Salvador | 1 | 0 | 0 | 1 |
| 5 | Paraguay | 1 | 0 | 0 | 1 |
| 7 | Chinese Taipei | 0 | 3 | 0 | 3 |
| 8 | France | 0 | 1 | 2 | 3 |
| 9 | Switzerland | 0 | 1 | 1 | 2 |
| 10 | Chile | 0 | 0 | 1 | 1 |
| 10 | China* | 0 | 0 | 1 | 1 |
| 10 | Germany | 0 | 0 | 1 | 1 |
| 10 | India | 0 | 0 | 1 | 1 |
| Totals (13 entries) | | 11 | 9 | 10 | 30 |

== Medalists ==
=== Men ===
| Event | Gold | Silver | Bronze |
|---|---|---|---|
| 200 m time trial | Jhoan Guzmán; Spain | Kuo Li-yang; Chinese Taipei | Jhon Tascon; Colombia |
| 500 m sprint | Jhoan Guzmán; Spain | Jhon Tascon; Colombia | Zhang Zhenhai; China |
| 1,000 m sprint | Jhoan Guzmán; Spain | Jhon Tascon; Colombia | Anandkumar Velkumar; India |
| 5,000 m elimination race | Julio Mirena; Paraguay | Chao Tsu-cheng; Chinese Taipei | Livio Wenger; Switzerland |
| 10,000 m elimination race | Juan Mantilla; Colombia | Livio Wenger; Switzerland | Martin Ferrié; France |

=== Women ===
| Event | Gold | Silver | Bronze |
|---|---|---|---|
| 200 m time trial | Ivonne Nóchez; El Salvador | Haila Brunet; France | Fran Vanhoutte; Belgium |
| 500 m sprint | Fran Vanhoutte; Belgium | Liu Yi-hsuan; Chinese Taipei | Catalina Lorca; Chile |
| 1,000 m sprint | María Fernanda Timms; Colombia | Gabriela Rueda; Colombia | Fran Vanhoutte; Belgium |
| 5,000 m elimination race | Gabriela Vargas; Ecuador | non awarded | Larissa Gaiser; Germany |
| 5,000 m elimination race | Gabriela Rueda; Colombia | non awarded | Larissa Gaiser; Germany |
| 10,000 m elimination race | Gabriela Rueda; Colombia | Gabriela Vargas; Ecuador | Marine Lefeuvre; France |
