= El Salvador at the 2013 World Games =

- IOC code: ESA

in Cali, Colombia 25 July 2013 – 4 August 2013
- Competitors: 2 in 1 sport
- Medals: Gold 0 Silver 0 Bronze 1 Total 1

World Games appearances
- 1981; 1985; 1989; 1993; 1997; 2001; 2005; 2009; 2013; 2017; 2022

El Salvador competed at the 2013 World Games held in Cali, Colombia. Two competitors represented El Salvador; they both competed in the men's compound archery event.

== Medalists ==
Medal	Name	Sport	Event
Bronze	Roberto Hernández	Archery	Men's compound

== Archery ==
Roberto Hernández won the bronze medal in the men's compound event. Jorge Jiménez also competed in the men's compound event.
