= Sara López =

Colombian archer (born 1995)

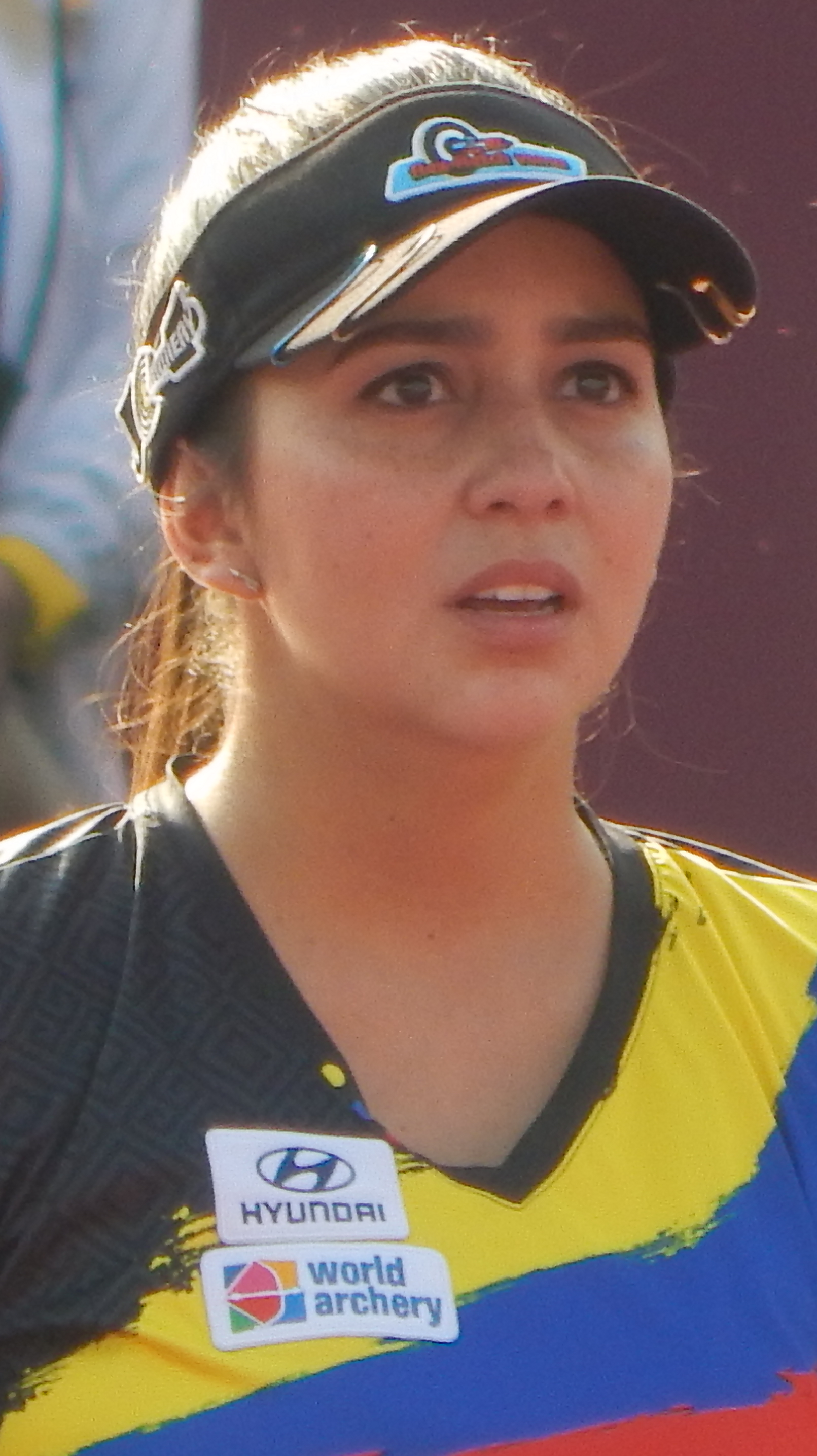
- Lopez in 2019

Personal information
- Full name: Sara José López Bueno
- Nickname: "Compound Archery Queen"
- Born: April 24, 1995 (age 31) Pereira, Colombia
- Height: 1.65 m (5 ft 5 in)
- Weight: 80 kg (180 lb)

Sport
- Country: Colombia
- Sport: Archery
- Event: Compound
Medal record
Representing Colombia
Women's compound archery
| Event | 1st | 2nd | 3rd |
|---|---|---|---|
| World Championships | 5 | 1 | 1 |
| World Youth Championships | 3 | 1 | 0 |
| World Cup Final | 9 | 0 | 1 |
| World Cup | 28 | 12 | 8 |
| World Games | 2 | 1 | 1 |
| Pan American Games | 2 | 1 | 1 |
| Pan American Championships | 6 | 9 | 2 |
| CAC Games | 5 | 4 | 2 |
| South American Games | 9 | 0 | 0 |
| Bolivarian Games | 11 | 0 | 0 |
| Total | 80 | 29 | 16 |
World Championships
| Gold medal – first place | 2013 Belek | Team |
| Gold medal – first place | 2017 Mexico City | Team |
| Gold medal – first place | 2021 Yankton | Individual |
| Gold medal – first place | 2021 Yankton | Team |
| Gold medal – first place | 2021 Yankton | Mixed team |
| Silver medal – second place | 2023 Berlin | Mixed team |
| Bronze medal – third place | 2015 Copenhagen | Individual |
World Cup Final
| Gold medal – first place | 2014 Lausanne | Individual |
| Gold medal – first place | 2015 Mexico City | Individual |
| Gold medal – first place | 2017 Rome | Individual |
| Gold medal – first place | 2018 Samsun | Individual |
| Gold medal – first place | 2019 Moscow | Individual |
| Gold medal – first place | 2021 Yankton | Individual |
| Gold medal – first place | 2022 Tlaxcala | Individual |
| Gold medal – first place | 2023 Hermosillo | Individual |
| Gold medal – first place | 2024 Tlaxcala | Individual |
| Bronze medal – third place | 2026 Saltillo | Individual |
World Games
| Gold medal – first place | 2017 Wroclaw | Individual |
| Gold medal – first place | 2022 Birmingham | Mixed team |
| Silver medal – second place | 2022 Birmingham | Individual |
| Bronze medal – third place | 2013 Cali | Individual |
Pan American Games
| Gold medal – first place | 2019 Lima | Individual |
| Gold medal – first place | 2023 Santiago | Mixed team |
| Silver medal – second place | 2023 Santiago | Team |
| Bronze medal – third place | 2019 Lima | Mixed team |
Pan American Championships
| Gold medal – first place | 2014 Rosario | Team |
| Gold medal – first place | 2014 Rosario | Mixed team |
| Gold medal – first place | 2016 San José | Mixed team |
| Gold medal – first place | 2018 Medellín | Individual |
| Gold medal – first place | 2021 Monterrey | Team |
| Gold medal – first place | 2021 Monterrey | Mixed team |
| Silver medal – second place | 2016 San José | Team |
| Silver medal – second place | 2018 Medellín | Team |
| Silver medal – second place | 2018 Medellín | Mixed team |
| Silver medal – second place | 2021 Monterrey | Individual |
| Silver medal – second place | 2022 Santiago | Team |
| Silver medal – second place | 2022 Santiago | Mixed team |
| Silver medal – second place | 2024 Medellín | Mixed team |
| Silver medal – second place | 2026 Tlaxcala | Individual |
| Silver medal – second place | 2026 Tlaxcala | Team |
| Bronze medal – third place | 2022 Santiago | Individual |
| Bronze medal – third place | 2024 Medellín | Individual |
Central American and Caribbean Games
| Gold medal – first place | 2014 Veracruz | Individual |
| Gold medal – first place | 2018 Barranquilla | Individual |
| Gold medal – first place | 2023 San Salvador | Mixed team |
| Gold medal – first place | 2026 Santo Domingo | Individual |
| Gold medal – first place | 2026 Santo Domingo | Mixed team |
| Silver medal – second place | 2014 Veracruz | Team |
| Silver medal – second place | 2014 Veracruz | Mixed team |
| Silver medal – second place | 2018 Barranquilla | Team |
| Silver medal – second place | 2023 San Salvador | Team |
| Bronze medal – third place | 2023 San Salvador | Individual |
| Bronze medal – third place | 2026 Santo Domingo | Team |
South American Games
| Gold medal – first place | 2018 Cochabamba | Individual |
| Gold medal – first place | 2018 Cochabamba | Team |
| Gold medal – first place | 2018 Cochabamba | Mixed team |
| Gold medal – first place | 2022 Asunción | Individual |
| Gold medal – first place | 2022 Asunción | Team |
| Gold medal – first place | 2022 Asunción | Mixed team |
| Gold medal – first place | 2026 Santa Fe | Individual |
| Gold medal – first place | 2026 Santa Fe | Team |
| Gold medal – first place | 2026 Santa Fe | Mixed team |
Bolivarian Games
| Gold medal – first place | 2013 Trujillo | Individual |
| Gold medal – first place | 2013 Trujillo | Individual 50 m |
| Gold medal – first place | 2013 Trujillo | Team |
| Gold medal – first place | 2013 Trujillo | Mixed team |
| Gold medal – first place | 2017 Santa Marta | Individual |
| Gold medal – first place | 2017 Santa Marta | Individual 50 m |
| Gold medal – first place | 2017 Santa Marta | Team |
| Gold medal – first place | 2017 Santa Marta | Mixed team |
| Gold medal – first place | 2022 Valledupar | Individual |
| Gold medal – first place | 2022 Valledupar | Team |
| Gold medal – first place | 2022 Valledupar | Mixed team |
World Youth Championships
| Gold medal – first place | 2013 Wuxi | Individual |
| Gold medal – first place | 2013 Wuxi | Mixed team |
| Gold medal – first place | 2015 Yankton | Mixed team |
| Silver medal – second place | 2015 Yankton | Team |

Sara José López Bueno (born 24 April 1995), is a Colombian athlete who competes in compound archery. She first competed for the Colombian national team in 2011 Pre-Olympic event in Medellin, Colombia. She won medals at several editions of the World Games.

== Career ==
At the Archery World Cup in 2013, she qualified for the final. She rose to her highest world ranking of 3 in 2013, and her major achievements include winning the 2014 Archery World Cup. As well as competing internationally in archery, she is a medical student.

López is the current world record holder for a 15-arrow round and other 10 world records, having become the first woman to shoot a perfect 150 at stage 3 of the World Cup in Medellín.

In 2020, she won the inaugural Lockdown Knockout tournament organised by World Archery. In the final she defeated Anders Faugstad of Norway.

She won the 2021 Athlete of the Year award by World Archery Americas in the compound women category.

She won the silver medal in the women's compound event at the 2022 World Games held in Birmingham, Alabama, United States. López and Daniel Muñoz won the gold medal in the mixed team compound event.
