= Ana Luiza Caetano =

Brazilian archer (born 2002)

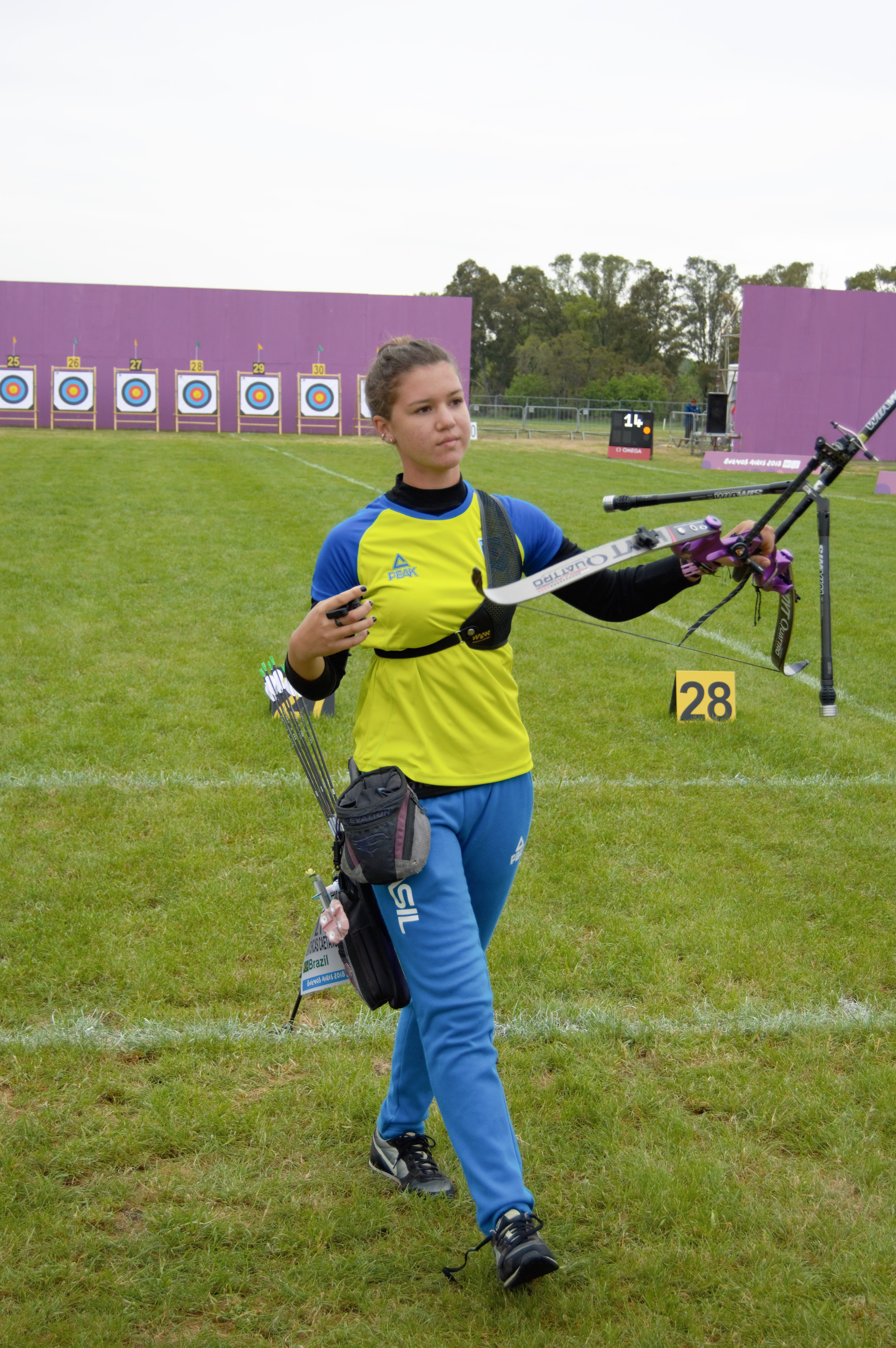
- 2018 Summer Youth Olympics

Personal information
- Born: Ana Luiza Sliachticas Caetano; 18 November 2002 (age 23) Maricá, Rio de Janeiro, Brazil

Sport
- Country: Brazil
- Sport: Archery
- Event: Recurve
Medal record
Representing Brazil
Women's recurve archery
Archery World Cup
Bronze medal – third place	2022 Medellin	Mixed team
Pan American Championships
Gold medal – first place	2024 Medellín	Mixed team
Bronze medal – third place	2024 Medellín	Team
Bronze medal – third place	2026 Tlaxcala	Team
Bronze medal – third place	2026 Tlaxcala	Mixed team
South American Games
Gold medal – first place	2018 Cochabamba	Team
Gold medal – first place	2022 Asunción	Team
Gold medal – first place	2026 Santa Fe	Team
Gold medal – first place	2026 Santa Fe	Mixed team
Bronze medal – third place	2022 Asunción	Individual
Junior Pan American Games
Bronze medal – third place	2021 Cali-Valle	Team

Ana Luiza Sliachticas Caetano (born 18 November 2002) is a Brazilian archer who competes in recurve events. She is a three-times winner of the Brazilian Archery Championship. She is also a published writer.

== Early life ==
Her first love was sailing which she practiced since she was 7 years old, until she started archery in 2014, through a project to encourage the sport in her city of Maricá, Rio de Janeiro.

== Career ==
In May 2018, Caetano qualified for the 2018 Summer Youth Olympics during the continental qualifying tournament, in Guatemala City, by getting the gold in the girl's individual event. At the Youth Olympics, in Buenos Aires, she participated in the mixed team (together with Belgian Senna Roos, reaching the round of 16) and girls' individual events (defeated in the elimination rounds).

She competed in the 2019 Pan American Games, participating in the women's individual recurve (tied in ninth place) and the women's team recurve (fourth place together with Ane Marcelle dos Santos e Graziela dos Santos).

Caetano won bronze in the individual and gold in the women's team event at the 2022 South American Games. She won a bronze medal at the 2022 Archery World Cup alongside Marcus D'Almeida in the recurve mixed team, beating 2021 Tokyo Olympic winning duo of An San and Kim Je-deok for bronze.

She won gold in the mixed team with Marcus D'Almeida at the 2024 Pan American Archery Championships in Medellín in April 2024. She won bronze with the women’s team (together with Ana Machado and Graziela dos Santos) at the same Championships.

Caetano was selected for the 2024 Paris Olympics to compete in the individual event as well as the mixed team with Marcus D'Almeida. After the individual ranking round, she ranked 19th, but progressed to the round of 16.

== Personal life ==
In 2013, she published the book Bons Ventos: Diário de Aventuras Iradas about her experiences sailing, in partnership with her brother João Pio, who was the illustrator of the work. Three years later, she released her second book Eureka.
