= Squash at the 2009 World Games – men's singles =

2009 World Games - Squash Single Men
Host	(Taiwan) Kaohsiung
Dates	July 21–24, 2009
Teams	29
Podium
Champion	(United Kingdom) Nick Matthew
Runners-up	(United Kingdom) James Willstrop
Third place	(Malaysia) Mohd Azlan Iskandar
Fourth place	(Australia) Stewart Boswell

The Squash - Single Men competition at the World Games 2009 took place from July 21 to July 24, at the Chung Cheng Martial Arts Stadium in Kaohsiung, Taiwan.

== Seeds ==
1. (United Kingdom) Nick Matthew (Champion)
2. (United Kingdom) James Willstrop (Final)
3. (Malaysia) Mohd Azlan Iskandar (Semifinals)
4. (Malaysia) Ong Beng Hee (Quarterfinals)
5. (Australia) Stewart Boswell (Semifinals)
6. (Australia) Cameron Pilley (Quarterfinals)
7. (Egypt) Omar Mosaad (Quarterfinals)
8. (India) Saurav Ghosal (Quarterfinals)

== Draw ==
First Round
1	(United Kingdom) Nick Matthew	3
(British Virgin Islands) Joe Chapman	0
(Australia) Scott Arnold	1
15	(Malaysia) Mohd Nafiizwan Adnan	3
9	(France) Renan Lavigne	3
(Hong Kong) Max Lee	2
6	(Australia) Cameron Pilley	3
(Guatemala) Italo Bonatti	0
(Hong Kong) Dick Lau	0
12	(Hungary) Márk Krajcsák	3
11	(Australia) Aaron Frankcomb	3
(United States) Chris Gordon	0
(Russia) Alexei Severinov	0
3	(Malaysia) Mohd Azlan Iskandar	3
4	(Malaysia) Ong Beng Hee	3
(Japan) Yuta Fukui	1
(India) Ritwik Bhattacharya	0
13	(France) Julien Balbo	3
(South Korea) Nyeon-Ho Lee	0
5	(Australia) Stewart Boswell	3
7	(Egypt) Omar Mosaad	3
(Canada) Robin Clarke	1
(Germany) Jens Schoor	0
16	(South Africa) Stephen Coppinger	3
(Chinese Taipei) Huang Cheng-Yao	0
2	(United Kingdom) James Willstrop	3

Round of 16
1	(United Kingdom) Nick Matthew	3
15	(Malaysia) Mohd Nafiizwan Adnan	0
9	(France) Renan Lavigne	0
8	(India) Saurav Ghosal	3
6	(Australia) Cameron Pilley	3
12	(Hungary) Márk Krajcsák	0
11	(Australia) Aaron Frankcomb	1
3	(Malaysia) Mohd Azlan Iskandar	3
4	(Malaysia) Ong Beng Hee	0
13	(France) Julien Balbo	3
10	(Egypt) Omar Abdel Aziz	0
5	(Australia) Stewart Boswell	3
7	(Egypt) Omar Mosaad	3
16	(South Africa) Stephen Coppinger	0
14	(Germany) Simon Rösner	2
2	(United Kingdom) James Willstrop	3

Quarter finals
1	(United Kingdom) Nick Matthew	3
8	(India) Saurav Ghosal	1
6	(Australia) Cameron Pilley	0
3	(Malaysia) Mohd Azlan Iskandar	3
13	(France) Julien Balbo	0
5	(Australia) Stewart Boswell	3
7	(Egypt) Omar Mosaad	1
2	(United Kingdom) James Willstrop	3

Semi finals
1	(United Kingdom) Nick Matthew	3
3	(Malaysia) Mohd Azlan Iskandar	2
5	(Australia) Stewart Boswell	0 r
2	(United Kingdom) James Willstrop	3

Finals
1	(United Kingdom) Nick Matthew	3
2	(United Kingdom) James Willstrop	0

Note: * w/d = Withdraw, * w/o = Walkover, * r = Retired

3rd place
3	(Malaysia) Mohd Azlan Iskandar
5	(Australia) Stewart Boswell	w/o
