= Jean-Philippe Boulch =

French archer (born 1991)

Personal information
- Born: 28 May 1991 (age 35)

Sport
- Sport: Archery
- Event: Compound
Medal record
Men's compound archery
Representing France
World Championships
Silver medal – second place	2025 Gwangju	Team
World Indoor Championships
Bronze medal – third place	2016 Ankara	Team
European Championships
Gold medal – first place	2026 Antalya	Team
Bronze medal – third place	2016 Nottingham	Team
European Indoor Championships
Gold medal – first place	2018 Legnica	Mixed team
Gold medal – first place	2019 Samsun	Team
Gold medal – first place	2026 Plovdiv	Team
Silver medal – second place	2018 Legnica	Team
Silver medal – second place	2022 Laško	Individual
World Games
Silver medal – second place	2022 Birmingham	Individual

Jean-Philippe Boulch (born 28 May 1991) is a French compound archer.

== Career ==
In March 2016, Boulch competed at the 2016 World Indoor Archery Championships and won a bronze medal in the team event. In May 2016, he competed at the 2016 European Archery Championships and won a bronze medal in the team event.

He competed at the 2018 European Archery Championships and won a gold medal in the mixed team event, along with Sophie Dodemont, and a silver medal in the men's team event. He then competed at the 2019 European Indoor Archery Championships and won a gold medal in the men's team event.

In February 2022, he competed at the 2022 European Indoor Archery Championships and won a silver medal in the individual event. In July 2022, he competed at the 2022 World Games and won a silver medal in the individual compound event.

In September 2025, Dubois competed at the 2025 World Archery Championships and won a silver medal in the men's team compound event, along with François Dubois and Nicolas Girard.

In May 2026, he competed at the 2026 European Archery Championships and won a gold medal in the team compound event. This was France's first gold medal in the event since 2012.
