= Namrata Batra =

Indian wushu player

Personal information
- Born: 6 September 2000 (age 26) Indore, Madhya Pradesh, India
- Education: Master of Commerce

Sport
- Sport: Wushu
- Event: Sanda
- Club: Sports Authority of India
Medal record
Women's wushu
Representing India
World Games
Silver medal – second place	2025 Chengdu	52kg
Asian Championships
Silver medal – second place	2024 Macau	52kg
Asia Cup
Bronze medal – third place	2025 Songyuan	52kg
Asian Junior Championships
Silver medal – second place	2017 Gumi	48kg

Namrata Batra (born 6 September 2000) is an Indian wushu player, who competes in the women's sanda discipline. She is the first Indian to win a medal in wushu at the World Games, winning silver at the 2025 edition.

== Early life ==
Batra was born in Indore, Madhya Pradesh. Her father, Sanjay Batra, is a businessman and her mother a homemaker. Although her grandparents opposed it due to the attire she would have to wear, Batra's parents encouraged her to do sports as she was not interested in academic subjects.

She started training in a traditional Indian akhada and took up wushu after attending a self-defence program aged 13. She was coached by Sonu Jatav, who encouraged her to do wushu competitively.

== Career ==
Batra began competing in 2015, winning gold at her first Junior National Championships while representing the state of Madhya Pradesh. She later received the State Award from the Government of Madhya Pradesh for her contributions to the sport.

In 2017, Batra won a silver medal in the Junior Asian Championships.

Batra trained at the Sports Authority of India's National Centre of Excellence in Itanagar.

In 2023, Batra suffered a ligament injury during the Asian Games trials and did not compete for eight months. In 2024, she returned to competing, earning a silver medal at the 2024 Asian Championships and a bronze at the Moscow Star International Wushu Championship in 2025. At the 2025 World Games, Batra won silver (defeating Lebanon's El Rassi in the quarterfinals and the Philippines' Krizan Faith Collado in the semifinals), which was India's first medal in the sport.
