= Amit Chaudhary =

Indian linguist

Amit Chaudhary, is an Indian bodybuilder. He participated in World Games 2005 and 2009 representing India. National Gold medal total 18 times. First Indian Bodybuilding Athlete to achieve a place in World Games 2004, Antop Germany .Only Indian Bodybuilding Athlete who passed dope test 13 times in Delhi. He was married to Romy Chaudhary a government teacher in 2017. And has a daughter named Shivika Chaudhary. He is currently living in Bulandshahar. His Father was Gulvir Singh Chaudhary, a well known advocate and activist and involved in politics of Bulandshahar. Amit Chaudhary's mother Chandrakanta Chaudhary was also active in local politics . Amit Chaudhary has three siblings two elder sisters and one elder brother Anurag Chaudhary who was also his coach during his participation in world games. His brother Anurag Chaudhary is today the president of IBBFF (Indian Bodybuilding and Fitness Federation) and a senior advocate. In September 2011, he was given the Laxman Award by Uttar Pradesh government and in 2019 Amit Chaudhary was honoured with the Youth Icon award by chief minister Yogi Adityanath. He is not active in bodybuilding as a competitor today but organises championships on his own.

== Participation history ==
Year	Event	Rank
2004	National Championships	1st
2004	South Asian Championships	1st
2005	National Championships	1st
2005	IFBB Asian Amateur Championships - Light-MiddleWeight	11th
2005	World Games - Bodybuilding 75 kg	7th
2007	IFBB Asian Amateur Championships - WelterWeight	9th
2008	IFBB Asian Amateur Championships - Light-HeavyWeight	6th
2009	IFBB Asian Amateur Championships - Light-MiddleWeight	4th
2009	IFBB World Amateur Championships - MiddleWeight	Did not place
2009	World Games - Bodybuilding 80 kg	5th
2010	IFBB Arnold Amateur - Light-HeavyWeight	Did not place
2012	IFBB Asian Amateur Championships - MiddleWeight	4th
