= Daniel Muñoz (archer) =

Colombian archer (born 1989)

Personal information
- Full name: Daniel Muñoz Perez
- Born: 22 March 1989 (age 37)

Sport
- Country: Colombia
- Sport: Archery
- Event: Compound
Medal record
Representing Colombia
Men's compound archery
Event	1st	2nd	3rd
World Championships	1	0	1
World Cup Final	0	0	1
World Cup	4	6	0
World Games	1	0	0
Pan American Games	0	0	2
Pan American Championships	5	1	0
CAC Games	0	1	2
South American Games	2	1	1
Bolivarian Games	4	2	2
Total	17	11	9
World Championships
Gold medal – first place	2021 Yankton	Mixed team
Bronze medal – third place	2017 Mexico City	Team
World Cup Final
Bronze medal – third place	2019 Moscow	Individual
World Games
Gold medal – first place	2022 Birmingham	Mixed team
Pan American Games
Bronze medal – third place	2019 Lima	Individual
Bronze medal – third place	2019 Lima	Mixed team
Pan American Championships
Gold medal – first place	2014 Rosario	Individual
Gold medal – first place	2016 San José	Team
Gold medal – first place	2018 Medellín	Team
Gold medal – first place	2021 Monterrey	Individual
Gold medal – first place	2021 Monterrey	Team
Silver medal – second place	2018 Medellín	Mixed team
Central American and Caribbean Games
Silver medal – second place	2014 Veracruz	Mixed team
Bronze medal – third place	2014 Veracruz	Team
Bronze medal – third place	2018 Barranquilla	Team
South American Games
Gold medal – first place	2018 Cochabamba	Team
Gold medal – first place	2022 Asunción	Team
Silver medal – second place	2018 Cochabamba	Individual
Bronze medal – third place	2010 Medellín	Individual over all distances
Bolivarian Games
Gold medal – first place	2017 Santa Marta	Team
Gold medal – first place	2022 Valledupar	Individual
Gold medal – first place	2022 Valledupar	Team
Gold medal – first place	2022 Valledupar	Mixed team
Silver medal – second place	2017 Santa Marta	Individual
Silver medal – second place	2025 Lima-Ayacucho	Team
Bronze medal – third place	2013 Trujillo	Team
Bronze medal – third place	2025 Lima-Ayacucho	Individual

Daniel Muñoz Perez (Note: In this Spanish name, the first or paternal surname is Muñoz and the second or maternal family name is Perez.) (born 22 March 1989) is a Colombian archer competing in compound events. He won the bronze medal in the men's individual compound event at the 2019 Pan American Games held in Lima, Peru. He also won the gold medal in the men's individual compound event at the 2022 Bolivarian Games held in Valledupar, Colombia.

== Career ==
Muñoz won the bronze medal in the men's team compound event at the 2017 World Archery Championships held in Mexico City, Mexico.

Muñoz and Sara López won the gold medal in the mixed team compound event at 2022 World Games held in Birmingham, United States. Muñoz also competed in the men's individual compound event.

== Achievements ==
Year	Competition	Location	Rank	Event
Representing Colombia
2013	Bolivarian Games	Trujillo, Peru	3rd	Team
2014	Pan American Archery Championships	Rosario, Argentina	1st	Individual
2016	Pan American Archery Championships	San José, Costa Rica	1st	Team
2017	World Archery Championships	Mexico City, Mexico	3rd	Team
2017	Bolivarian Games	Santa Marta, Colombia	2nd	Individual
2017	Bolivarian Games	Santa Marta, Colombia	1st	Team
2018	South American Games	Cochabamba, Bolivia	2nd	Individual
2018	South American Games	Cochabamba, Bolivia	1st	Team
2018	Central American and Caribbean Games	Barranquilla, Colombia	3rd	Team
2018	Pan American Archery Championships	Medellín, Colombia	1st	Team
2018	Pan American Archery Championships	Medellín, Colombia	2nd	Mixed team
2019	Pan American Games	Lima, Peru	3rd	Individual
2019	Pan American Games	Lima, Peru	3rd	Mixed team
2021	Pan American Archery Championships	Monterrey, Mexico	1st	Individual
2021	Pan American Archery Championships	Monterrey, Mexico	1st	Team
2022	Bolivarian Games	Valledupar, Colombia	1st	Individual
2022	Bolivarian Games	Valledupar, Colombia	1st	Team
2022	Bolivarian Games	Valledupar, Colombia	1st	Mixed team
2022	World Games	Birmingham, United States	1st	Mixed team
2022	South American Games	Asunción, Paraguay	1st	Team
