= Nicolas Girard (archer) =

French archer (born 2000)

Personal information
- Born: 22 May 2000 (age 26)

Sport
- Sport: Archery
- Event: Compound
Medal record
Men's compound archery
Representing France
World Championships
Gold medal – first place	2025 Gwangju	Individual
Silver medal – second place	2025 Gwangju	Team
European Championships
Gold medal – first place	2026 Antalya	Team
Silver medal – second place	2021 Antalya	Team
European Indoor Championships
Gold medal – first place	2025 Samsun	Individual
Gold medal – first place	2026 Plovdiv	Team
Silver medal – second place	2026 Plovdiv	Individual
Bronze medal – third place	2022 Laško	Individual
Bronze medal – third place	2024 Varaždin	Individual

Nicolas Girard (born 22 May 2000) is a French compound archer. He won the gold medal in the men's individual compound event at the 2025 World Archery Championships.

== Career ==
In February 2025, Girard competed at the 2025 European Indoor Archery Championships and won a gold medal in the men's individual compound. In September 2025, he competed at the 2025 World Archery Championships and won a gold medal in the men's individual compound and a silver medal in the men's team compound. He became France's second compound men's world champion after Sebastien Peineau in 2017.

In May 2026, he competed at the 2026 European Archery Championships and won a gold medal in the team compound event. This was France's first gold medal in the event since 2012.
