= Braden Gellenthien =

American archer (born 1986)

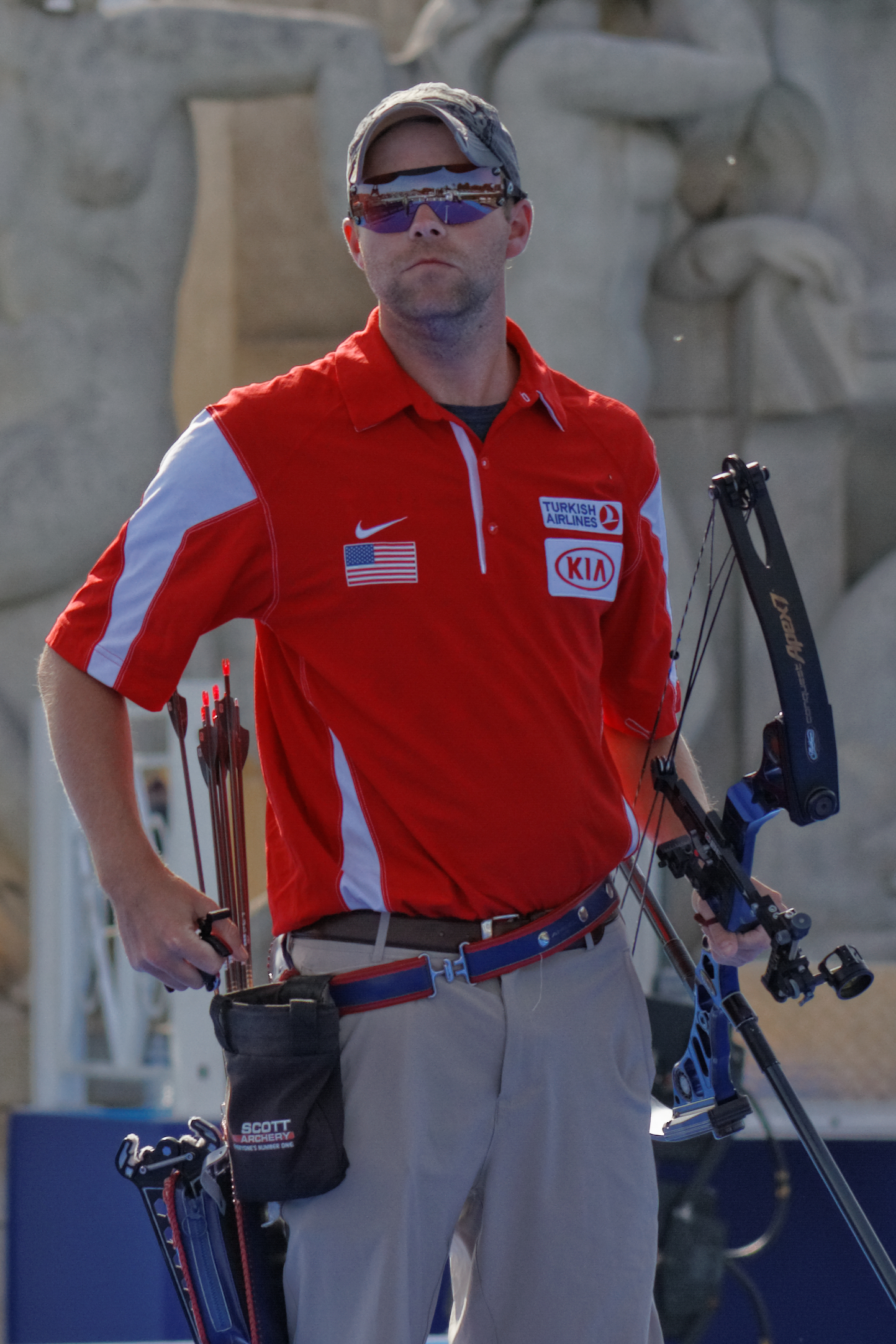
- Gellenthien at FITA World Cup, September 2013

Personal information
- Born: April 26, 1986 (age 40) Boston, Massachusetts, U.S.
- Home town: Hudson, Massachusetts, U.S.
Medal record
Men's compound archery
Representing United States
World Championships
Gold medal – first place	2017 Mexico	Team
Gold medal – first place	2009 Ulsan	Team
Gold medal – first place	2011 Turin	Team
Gold medal – first place	2021 Yankton	Team
Silver medal – second place	2007 Leipzig	Individual
Bronze medal – third place	2017 Mexico	Individual
World Cup
Gold medal – first place	2017 Rome	Individual
Gold medal – first place	2012 Tokyo	Individual
Silver medal – second place	2007 Dubai	Individual
Silver medal – second place	2009 Copenhagen	Individual
Silver medal – second place	2010 Edinburgh	Individual
Silver medal – second place	2013 Paris	Individual
Indoor World Championships
Gold medal – first place	2007 İzmir	Individual
Gold medal – first place	2009 Rzeszów	Team
Gold medal – first place	2012 Las Vegas	Team
Gold medal – first place	2014 Nîmes	Team
Pan American Games
Silver medal – second place	2019 Lima	Individual
Summer Universiade
Silver medal – second place	2005 İzmir	Team

Braden Gellenthien (born April 26, 1986) is an American compound archer. He is a former world number one archer and has won individual gold medals at the FITA Archery World Cup, Indoor World Championships and Arizona Cup, and team gold medals at the World Archery Championships.

He won the 2021 Athlete of the Year award by World Archery Americas in the compound men category.

He competed at the 2022 World Games held in Birmingham, Alabama, United States.

He is married to Danish archer Tanja Jensen.
