= Roberto Hernández (archer) =

Salvadoran archer (born 1989)

Personal information
- Full name: Roberto Alexander Hernández Maldonado
- Born: 9 January 1989 (age 37)

Sport
- Country: El Salvador
- Sport: Archery
- Event: Compound
Medal record
Men's compound archery
Representing El Salvador
World Championships
Bronze medal – third place	2009 Ulsan	Team
World Games
Bronze medal – third place	2013 Cali	Individual
Pan American Games
Gold medal – first place	2019 Lima	Individual
Gold medal – first place	2023 Santiago	Team
Central American and Caribbean Games
Gold medal – first place	2018 Barranquilla	Individual
Gold medal – first place	2026 Santo Domingo	Team
Silver medal – second place	2018 Barranquilla	Team
Silver medal – second place	2023 San Salvador	Mixed team
Bronze medal – third place	2023 San Salvador	Team
Bolivarian Games
Gold medal – first place	2013 Trujillo	Individual 50 m
Gold medal – first place	2013 Trujillo	Team
Silver medal – second place	2022 Valledupar	Mixed team
Silver medal – second place	2025 Lima-Ayacucho	Individual
Silver medal – second place	2025 Lima-Ayacucho	Mixed team
Bronze medal – third place	2013 Trujillo	Individual
Bronze medal – third place	2013 Trujillo	Mixed team
Bronze medal – third place	2017 Santa Marta	Team

Roberto Alexander Hernández Maldonado (Note: In this Spanish name, the first or paternal surname is Hernández and the second or maternal family name is Maldonado.) (born 9 January 1989) is a Salvadoran archer competing in men's compound events.

== Career ==
He won the gold medal in the men's individual compound event at the 2019 Pan American Games held in Lima, Peru. As a result, he became the first man from El Salvador to win gold at the Pan American Games. He was the flag bearer during the Parade of Nations at the 2019 Pan American Games opening ceremony.

In 2013, Hernández represented El Salvador at the World Games in Cali, Colombia and won the bronze medal in the men's compound event. He also competed at the 2017 World Games in Wrocław, Poland without winning a medal. He represented El Salvador at the 2022 World Games held in Birmingham, United States. He competed in the men's individual compound and mixed team compound events.

Hernández won two medals at the 2023 Central American and Caribbean Games held in El Salvador: the bronze medal in the men's team compound event and the silver medal in the mixed team compound event. Hernández also competed at the 2023 World Archery Championships held in Berlin, Germany.
