= 1985 World Games =

Multi-sport events in London, England

World Games II
- Host city: London, United Kingdom
- Motto: Sport is a universal language, the world is one family, all mankind are brothers and sisters.
- Nations: 33
- Athletes: 1,550
- Events: 134
- Opening: 25 July 1985
- Closing: 4 August 1985
- Opened by: Charles Palmer; Chairman of British Olympic Association
- Main venue: Wembley Stadium

The 1985 World Games were the second edition of the World Games, an international multi-sport event held in London. Three main venues were used, the main one being the Crystal Palace National Sports Centre. The opening ceremony was held at the Wembley Conference Centre. The master of ceremonies was television commentator Ron Pickering. Competitors were addressed by World Games Association President Dr Un Yong Kim, who told competitors, "the World Games is an innovation that deserves a warm welcome." Games Patron Ryoichi Sasakawa underwrote the financial shortfall to enable the Games to take place. British Olympic Association Chairman Charles Palmer opened the Games on behalf of the British sports community. The song "World Game" by John Denver was adopted as the theme for the Games. Sports included field archery, taekwondo, karate, sambo, powerlifting, finswimming, roller sports, casting, korfball, water skiing, speedway, fistball, softball and netball. The ground team at Crystal Palace was headed by former Nottingham Forest player Roy Dwight with assistance from Tosh Chamberlain. Television coverage was produced by Cheerleader productions. Commentators included Simon Reed, Martin Tyler, Gerald Sinstadt and Dave Lanning.

== Titles ==
134 titles were awarded in 22 sports (not including two invitational sports).

As Invitational sport

Sport	Titles	Notes
Artistic roller skating	4	
Roller speed skating	12	
Roller hockey	1	
Bodybuilding	6	
Boules	1	
Bowling	5	
Casting	12	
Field archery	4	
Fistball	1	
Finswimming	17	
Karate	12	
Korfball	1	
Life saving	12	
Netball	1	
Racquetball	2	
Sambo	17	
Taekwondo	8	
Trampoline	6	
Tug of war	2	
Water skiing	6	
Powerlifting	3	
Softball	1	
Motocross		
Speedway		
Total	134	

Venues included Wembley Conference Centre, Princes Club (Bedfont), Copthall Stadium. Wimbledon Stadium, Crystal Palace, David Lloyd Club, Tolmers Scout Camp and Stevenage Bowling Center.

== Medal table ==
The medal tally during the second World Games is as follows. Italy finished at the top of the medal standings. Two bronze medals were awarded in fistball and in each karate-kumite (9) and taekwondo (8) event.

* Host nation (Great Britain)

Rank	Nation	Gold	Silver	Bronze	Total
1	Italy (ITA)	27	29	22	78
2	United States (USA)	18	16	18	52
3	Spain (ESP)	15	11	5	31
4	West Germany (FRG)	13	12	16	41
5	Sweden (SWE)	12	8	5	25
6	Great Britain (GBR)*	11	11	21	43
7	France (FRA)	7	11	13	31
8	South Korea (KOR)	7	0	1	8
9	Netherlands (NED)	5	1	3	9
10	Japan (JPN)	5	1	2	8
11	Hungary (HUN)	4	4	5	13
12	Norway (NOR)	2	6	8	16
13	Ireland (IRL)	2	0	0	2
14	Canada (CAN)	1	5	5	11
15	Belgium (BEL)	1	4	4	9
16	Switzerland (SUI)	1	2	4	7
17	Austria (AUT)	1	1	0	2
17	New Zealand (NZL)	1	1	0	2
19	Singapore (SIN)	1	0	0	1
20	Australia (AUS)	0	4	5	9
21	Chinese Taipei (TPE)	0	3	1	4
22	Egypt (EGY)	0	2	2	4
23	Philippines (PHI)	0	2	1	3
24	Bahrain (BHR)	0	0	1	1
24	Brazil (BRA)	0	0	1	1
24	Colombia (COL)	0	0	1	1
24	Denmark (DEN)	0	0	1	1
24	Finland (FIN)	0	0	1	1
24	Ivory Coast (CIV)	0	0	1	1
24	Jamaica (JAM)	0	0	1	1
24	Mexico (MEX)	0	0	1	1
24	Monaco (MON)	0	0	1	1
24	Portugal (POR)	0	0	1	1
24	Venezuela (VEN)	0	0	1	1
Totals (34 entries)		134	134	152	420
