= 2025 World Archery Championships – Women's individual compound =

Women's individual compound at the 2025 World Archery Championships
- Venue: Gwangju International Archery Center
- Location: Gwangju, South Korea
- Dates: 6–9 September
- Competitors: 103 from 48 nations

Medalists
gold medal	Andrea Becerra	Mexico
silver medal	Sofía Paiz	El Salvador
bronze medal	Alejandra Usquiano	Colombia

The women's individual compound competition at the 2025 World Archery Championships, which will take place from 6 to 9 September 2025 in Gwangju, South Korea. The reigning world champion Aditi Gopichand Swami was not chosen for the Indian team, so she did not compete.

== Schedule ==
All times are in Korea Standard Time (UTC+09:00).

Date	Time	Round
Friday, 5 September		Official practice
Saturday, 6 September	09:00	Qualification round
Monday, 8 September	09:15; 09:53; 10:30	Elimination Round; First Round (1/48); Second round (1/24); Third Round (1/16)
Tuesday, 9 September	10:02; 14:05; 15:00; 15:30; 15:42	Final Round; Fourth round (1/8); Quarter-finals; Semi-finals; Bronze-medal match Gold-medal match

== Qualification round ==
Results after 72 arrows. The 103 archers were seeded and all of them participating in Elimination round.

High green denotes at least one round bye.

Rank	Name	Nation	Score	10+X	X
1	Andrea Becerra	Mexico	712	64	30
2	So Chae-won	South Korea	709	62	29
3	Jyothi Surekha Vennam	India	707	59	26
4	Tanja Gellenthien	Denmark	706	58	26
5	Begüm Yuva	Turkey	706	58	25
6	Ella Gibson	Great Britain	706	58	25
7	Han Seung-yeon	South Korea	704	56	23
8	Elisa Roner	Italy	703	56	28
9	Mariana Bernal	Mexico	703	57	31
10	Olivia Dean	United States	703	55	26
11	Parneet Kaur	India	703	55	21
12	Lisell Jäätma	Estonia	702	54	24
13	Alejandra Usquiano	Colombia	701	54	22
14	Meeri-Marita Paas	Estonia	700	54	32
15	Yurike Nina Bonita Pereira	Indonesia	699	51	19
16	Ratih Zilizati Fadhly	Indonesia	698	53	21
17	Huang I-jou	Chinese Taipei	698	51	27
18	Nguyễn Thị Kim Anh	Vietnam	698	51	19
19	Nurisa Dian Ashrifah	Indonesia	698	50	21
20	Arina Cherkezova	Individual Neutral Athletes	698	50	21
21	Nguyễn Thị Hai Chau	Vietnam	697	50	26
22	Alexis Ruiz	United States	697	50	19
23	Sim Soo-in	South Korea	696	52	20
24	Elizaveta Makhnenko	Individual Neutral Athletes	697	49	18
25	Chen Yi-hsuan	Chinese Taipei	696	52	20
26	Sydney Sullenberger	United States	696	51	23
27	Sanne de Laat	Netherlands	694	52	18
28	Amanda Mlinarić	Croatia	694	50	21
29	Roxana Yunussova	Kazakhstan	694	49	23
30	Sofie Marcussen	Denmark	694	48	23
31	Most Kulsum Akther Mone	Bangladesh	694	47	18
32	Adel Zhexenbinova	Kazakhstan	694	47	17
33	Jennifer Winsenne	Sweden	694	47	12
34	Bianca Rodrigues	Brazil	693	47	18
35	Amna Al-Awadhi	United Arab Emirates	693	46	21
36	Katharina Raab	Germany	692	47	22
37	Hazal Burun	Turkey	692	46	16
38	Andrea Muñoz	Spain	690	48	16
39	Sofía Paiz	El Salvador	690	46	17
40	Paola Corado	El Salvador	690	45	21
41	Rhiannon Mills	Australia	690	45	17
42	Li Mingxing	China	690	45	16
43	Giulia Di Nardo	Italy	690	44	11
44	Prithika Pradeep	India	690	43	20
45	Madeleine Ong Xue Li	Singapore	689	46	19
46	Mariia Dimidiuk	Individual Neutral Athletes	689	45	20
47	Paula Díaz Morillas	Spain	689	43	23
48	Kseniia Shkliar	Ukraine	689	43	19
49	Alexa Misis Olivares	Spain	688	42	11
50	Léa Girault	France	687	43	26
51	Isabelle Carpenter	Great Britain	687	41	14
52	Wang Lu-yun	Chinese Taipei	687	40	17
53	Paola Ramírez	Puerto Rico	687	40	12
54	Emine Rabia Oğuz	Turkey	686	42	18
55	Amaya Amparo Cojuangco	Philippines	686	42	17
56	Ambre Puiseux	France	685	43	13
57	Maris Tetsmann	Estonia	685	42	16
58	Sandra Jankowska	Poland	685	41	19
59	Adriana Castillo	Mexico	685	41	17
60	Fatin Nurfatehah Mat Salleh	Malaysia	685	40	16
61	Inga Timinskienė	Lithuania	685	40	13
62	Layla Annison	Great Britain	684	41	25
63	Chloé Leroy	France	684	41	16
64	Bonna Akter	Bangladesh	683	41	16
65	Bryanne Lameg	Canada	683	41	13
66	Jeanine van Kradenburg	South Africa	683	40	18
67	Ida Karlsson	Sweden	682	37	15
68	Ellie Teng Teng Low	Singapore	681	39	17
69	Viktoriya Lyan	Kazakhstan	681	38	14
70	Maria-Joao Ribeiro	Portugal	679	37	12
71	Anna Twining	Australia	679	36	12
72	Jennifer Walter	Germany	679	35	15
73	Martina Zikmundová	Czech Republic	678	38	10
74	Marie Marquardt	Germany	678	35	16
75	Fatimah Saad Almashhadani	Iraq	678	34	14
76	Georgina Graham	Australia	677	32	13
77	Camila Hikari Harada	Brazil	676	36	11
78	Puspita Zaman	Bangladesh	675	35	17
79	Magdalena Zygmunciak	Poland	675	35	14
80	Livia Haals Wieth-Knudsen	Denmark	675	34	16
81	Cheng Hung Ting	Hong Kong	674	32	8
82	Camila Alvarenga	El Salvador	673	34	13
83	Ami Fransson	Sweden	672	36	15
84	Aurora Olea Prado	Chile	672	33	14
85	Wang Cheuk Ying	Hong Kong	671	36	17
86	Larissa Aparecida Ferrari Oliveira	Brazil	671	28	6
87	Andrea Ratzer	Austria	669	28	9
88	Lívia Orihelová	Slovakia	668	34	15
89	Adriana Acevedo	Puerto Rico	667	30	13
90	Andrea Nicole Moccia	Italy	665	30	12
91	Lê Thị Yến Nhi	Vietnam	665	29	10
92	Marzena Nowak	Poland	664	31	14
93	Alma Ifergan	Israel	664	30	10
94	Sayaka Kamoda	Japan	664	27	7
95	Jolita Antanaitytė-Garškienė	Lithuania	662	29	9
96	Anna Maria Alfreðsdóttir	Iceland	661	27	11
97	Vanesa Caparas	Philippines	661	26	10
98	Eowyn Mamalias	Iceland	657	23	8
99	Wong Yuk Sheung	Hong Kong	655	23	7
100	Þórdís Unnur Bjarkadóttir	Iceland	654	27	7
101	Cheong Ieng	Macau	639	22	7
102	Milica Petronijević	Serbia	637	27	4
103	Michiko Brianna Gonzales	Philippines	629	17	6

== Final round ==
Quarter-finals
1	(Mexico) Andrea Becerra	148
9	(Mexico) Mariana Bernal	147
37	(Turkey) Hazal Burun	145
13	(Colombia) Alejandra Usquiano	149
3	(India) Jyothi Surekha Vennam	147
11	(India) Parneet Kaur	149
39	(El Salvador) Sofía Paiz	142
15	(Indonesia) Yurike Nina Bonita Pereira	139

Semi-finals
1	(Mexico) Andrea Becerra	148
13	(Colombia) Alejandra Usquiano	146
11	(India) Parneet Kaur	142
39	(El Salvador) Sofía Paiz	143

Final
1	(Mexico) Andrea Becerra	147
39	(El Salvador) Sofía Paiz	146
Third place
13	(Colombia) Alejandra Usquiano	145
11	(India) Parneet Kaur	144

== Elimination round ==
(+) Won the shoot-off by arrow closer to the center of the target.

=== Section 1 ===
1/48 finals
33	(Sweden) J Winsenne	145
80	(Denmark) L Wieth-Knudsen	142
81	(Hong Kong) Cheng HT	141
32	(Kazakhstan) A Zhexenbinova	142
17	(Chinese Taipei) Huang I-j	147
96	(Iceland) AM Alfreðsdóttir	132
65	(Canada) B Lameg	134
48	(Ukraine) K Shkliar	145
49	(Spain) A Misis Olivares	143
64	(Bangladesh) B Akter	144
97	(Philippines) V Caparas	135
16	(Indonesia) RZ Fadhly	142

1/24 finals
33	(Sweden) J Winsenne	140
32	(Kazakhstan) A Zhexenbinova	144
17	(Chinese Taipei) Huang I-j	149
48	(Ukraine) K Shkliar	146
64	(Bangladesh) B Akter	145^{X+}
16	(Indonesia) RZ Fadhly	145^{X}

1/16 finals
1	(Mexico) A Becerra	148
32	(Kazakhstan) A Zhexenbinova	144
17	(Chinese Taipei) Huang I-j	148
64	(Bangladesh) B Akter	145

1/8 finals
1	(Mexico) A Becerra	149
17	(Chinese Taipei) Huang I-j	145

=== Section 2 ===
1/48 finals
57	(Estonia) M Tetsmann	139
56	(France) A Puiseux	145
41	(Australia) R Mills	145
72	(Germany) J Walter	142
89	(Puerto Rico) A Acevedo	139
24	(Individual Neutral Athletes) E Makhnenko	147
25	(Chinese Taipei) Chen Y-h	148
88	(Slovakia) L Orihelová	136
73	(Czech Republic) M Zikmundová	144^{9+}
40	(El Salvador) P Corado	144^{9}

1/24 finals
9	(Mexico) M Bernal	145
56	(France) A Puiseux	144
41	(Australia) R Mills	145
24	(Individual Neutral Athletes) E Makhnenko	148
25	(Chinese Taipei) Chen Y-h	145
73	(Czech Republic) M Zikmundová	130

1/16 finals
9	(Mexico) M Bernal	148
24	(Individual Neutral Athletes) E Makhnenko	145
25	(Chinese Taipei) Chen Y-h	145
8	(Italy) E Roner	148

1/8 finals
9	(Mexico) M Bernal	147
8	(Italy) E Roner	145

=== Section 3 ===
1/48 finals
37	(Turkey) H Burun	140
76	(Australia) G Graham	137
85	(Hong Kong) Wang CY	143^{9}
28	(Croatia) A Mlinarić	143^{10}
21	(Vietnam) THC Nguyễn	139
92	(Poland) M Nowak	135
69	(Kazakhstan) V Lyan	139
44	(India) P Pradeep	145
53	(Puerto Rico) P Ramírez	141
60	(Malaysia) FN Mat Salleh	146
101	(Macau) Cheong I	138
12	(Estonia) L Jäätma	148

1/24 finals
37	(Turkey) H Burun	145^{10}
28	(Croatia) A Mlinarić	145^{9}
21	(Vietnam) THC Nguyễn	142
44	(India) P Pradeep	145
60	(Malaysia) FN Mat Salleh	142
12	(Estonia) L Jäätma	149

1/16 finals
5	(Turkey) B Yuva	146
37	(Turkey) H Burun	148
44	(India) P Pradeep	148
12	(Estonia) L Jäätma	145

1/8 finals
37	(Turkey) H Burun	146
44	(India) P Pradeep	143

=== Section 4 ===
1/48 finals
13	(Colombia) A Usquiano	146
100	(Iceland) TU Bjarkadóttir	140
61	(Lithuania) I Timinskienė	142
52	(Chinese Taipei) Wang L-y	144
45	(Singapore) MXL Ong	146
68	(Singapore) ETT Low	143
93	(Israel) A Ifergan	135
20	(Individual Neutral Athletes) A Cherkezova	143
29	(Kazakhstan) R Yunussova	148
84	(Chile) A Olea Prado	144
77	(Brazil) CH Harada	141
36	(Germany) K Raab	142

1/24 finals
13	(Colombia) A Usquiano	149
52	(Chinese Taipei) Wang L-y	145
45	(Singapore) MXL Ong	144
20	(Individual Neutral Athletes) A Cherkezova	146
29	(Kazakhstan) R Yunussova	146^{10}
36	(Germany) K Raab	146^{8}

1/16 finals
13	(Colombia) A Usquiano	148
20	(Individual Neutral Athletes) A Cherkezova	143
29	(Kazakhstan) R Yunussova	148
4	(Denmark) T Gellenthien	147

1/8 finals
13	(Colombia) A Usquiano	146
29	(Kazakhstan) R Yunussova	136

=== Section 5 ===
1/48 finals
35	(United Arab Emirates) A Al-Awadhi	141
78	(Bangladesh) P Zaman	139
83	(Sweden) A Fransson	141
30	(Denmark) S Marcussen	145
19	(Indonesia) ND Ashrifah	146
94	(Japan) S Kamoda	140
67	(Sweden) I Karlsson	144
46	(Individual Neutral Athletes) M Dimidiuk	141
51	(United Kingdom) I Carpenter	147
62	(United Kingdom) L Annison	140
99	(Hong Kong) Wong YS	141
14	(Estonia) M-M Paas	147

1/24 finals
35	(United Arab Emirates) A Al-Awadhi	146
30	(Denmark) S Marcussen	148
19	(Indonesia) ND Ashrifah	146
67	(Sweden) I Karlsson	145
51	(United Kingdom) I Carpenter	148
14	(Estonia) M-M Paas	143

1/16 finals
3	(India) JS Vennam	149
30	(Denmark) S Marcussen	148
19	(Indonesia) ND Ashrifah	148
51	(United Kingdom) I Carpenter	147

1/8 finals
3	(India) JS Vennam	148^{X+}
19	(Indonesia) ND Ashrifah	148^{X}

=== Section 6 ===
1/48 finals
11	(India) P Kaur	144
102	(Serbia) M Petronijević	129
59	(Mexico) A Castillo	145
54	(Turkey) ER Oğuz	143
43	(Italy) G Di Nardo	148
70	(Portugal) M-J Ribeiro	140
91	(Vietnam) TYN Lê	137
22	(United States) A Ruiz	149
27	(Netherlands) S de Laat	147
86	(Brazil) L Aparecida Ferrari Oliveira	136
75	(Iraq) FS Almashhadani	142
38	(Spain) A Muñoz	147

1/24 finals
11	(India) P Kaur	146
59	(Mexico) A Castillo	145
43	(Italy) G Di Nardo	146
22	(United States) A Ruiz	145
27	(Netherlands) S de Laat	143
38	(Spain) A Muñoz	144

1/16 finals
11	(India) P Kaur	148
43	(Italy) G Di Nardo	146
38	(Spain) A Muñoz	144
6	(United Kingdom) E Gibson	150

1/8 finals
11	(India) P Kaur	148
6	(United Kingdom) E Gibson	146

=== Section 7 ===
1/48 finals
39	(El Salvador) S Paiz	146
74	(Germany) M Marquardt	142
87	(Austria) A Ratzer	143
26	(United States) S Sullenberger	148
23	(South Korea) Sim S-i	144
90	(Italy) AN Moccia	143
71	(Australia) A Twining	139
42	(China) Li MX	145
55	(Philippines) AA Cojuangco	145
58	(Poland) S Jankowska	144
103	(Philippines) MB Gonzales	126
10	(United States) O Dean	145

1/24 finals
39	(El Salvador) S Paiz	146^{10}
26	(United States) S Sullenberger	146^{9}
23	(South Korea) Sim S-i	144
42	(China) Li MX	146
55	(Philippines) AA Cojuangco	144
10	(United States) O Dean	149

1/16 finals
7	(South Korea) Han S-y	144
39	(El Salvador) S Paiz	147
42	(China) Li MX	143
10	(United States) O Dean	149

1/8 finals
39	(El Salvador) S Paiz	142^{10+}
10	(United States) O Dean	142^{10}

=== Section 8 ===
1/48 finals
15	(Indonesia) YN Bonita Pereira	147
98	(Iceland) E Mamalias	140
63	(France) Ch Leroy	144
50	(France) L Girault	142
47	(Spain) P Díaz Morillas	146
66	(Netherlands) J van Kradenburg	147
95	(Lithuania) J Antanaitytė-Garškienė	144
18	(Vietnam) TKA Nguyễn	146
31	(Bangladesh) MKA Mone	149
82	(El Salvador) C Alvarenga	143
79	(Poland) M Zygmunciak	137
34	(Brazil) B Rodrigues	144

1/24 finals
15	(Indonesia) YN Bonita Pereira	147
63	(France) Ch Leroy	145
66	(Netherlands) J van Kradenburg	146
18	(Vietnam) TKA Nguyễn	148
31	(Bangladesh) MKA Mone	146
34	(Brazil) B Rodrigues	147

1/16 finals
15	(Indonesia) YN Bonita Pereira	146
18	(Vietnam) TKA Nguyễn	143
34	(Brazil) B Rodrigues	149^{10}
2	(South Korea) So C-w	149^{9}

1/8 finals
15	(Indonesia) YN Bonita Pereira	140
34	(Brazil) B Rodrigues	138
