= Archery at the 2022 Asian Games – Women's individual compound =

Women's individual compound at the 2022 Asian Games
- Venue: Fuyang Yinhu Sports Centre
- Dates: 1–7 October 2023
- Competitors: 51 from 20 nations

Medalists
gold medal	Jyothi Surekha	India
silver medal	So Chae-won	South Korea
bronze medal	Aditi Swami	India

The women's individual compound archery competition at the 2022 Asian Games was held from 1 to 7 October 2023 at Fuyang Yinhu Sports Centre.

A total of 51 archers participated in the ranking round. Only the top two archers from each country were allowed to progress to the knockout stage.

== Schedule ==
All times are China Standard Time (UTC+08:00)

Date	Time	Event
Sunday, 1 October 2023	09:00	Qualification round
Monday, 2 October 2023	13:05	1/32 eliminations
Monday, 2 October 2023	13:35	1/16 eliminations
Monday, 2 October 2023	14:05	1/8 eliminations
Tuesday, 3 October 2023	08:40	Quarterfinals
Tuesday, 3 October 2023	11:20	Semifinals
Saturday, 7 October 2023	08:40	Bronze medal match
Saturday, 7 October 2023	09:00	Gold medal match

== Results ==
=== Qualification round ===
Rank	Seed	Athlete	Half		Total	10s	Xs
Rank	Seed	Athlete	1st	2nd	Total	10s	Xs
1	1	Jyothi Surekha (IND)	355	349	704	57	34
2	2	So Chae-won (KOR)	349	350	699	52	23
3	3	Oh Yoo-hyun (KOR)	348	349	697	49	23
4	4	Aditi Swami (IND)	346	350	696	50	14
5	5	Chen Yi-hsuan (TPE)	348	347	695	49	21
6	—	Cho Su-a (KOR)	348	343	691	45	16
7	6	Ratih Zilizati Fadhly (INA)	345	345	690	46	16
8	7	Huang I-jou (TPE)	346	344	690	44	21
9	8	Contessa Loh (SGP)	345	344	689	46	15
10	9	Adel Zhexenbinova (KAZ)	346	343	689	44	20
11	—	Wang Lu-yun (TPE)	346	342	688	45	18
12	—	Parneet Kaur (IND)	343	344	687	43	18
13	—	Chen Li-ju (TPE)	342	344	686	44	15
14	10	Gisa Baibordi (IRI)	337	349	686	41	18
15	—	Avneet Kaur (IND)	340	345	685	42	12
16	—	Song Yun-soo (KOR)	346	338	684	42	25
17	11	Nguyễn Thị Hải Châu (VIE)	343	341	684	41	19
18	12	Amaya Cojuangco (PHI)	343	341	684	41	14
19	13	Syahara Khoerunisa (INA)	343	340	683	42	22
20	14	Kanyavee Maneesombatkul (THA)	339	342	681	39	17
21	15	Elmira Raissova (KAZ)	341	340	681	34	18
22	16	Fatimah Saad (IRQ)	340	336	676	40	17
23	—	Sri Ranti (INA)	338	338	676	37	15
24	17	Nichaphat Bunyapalin (THA)	336	340	676	35	15
25	18	Bonna Akter (BAN)	340	336	676	34	8
26	—	Roxana Yunussova (KAZ)	333	342	675	36	19
27	19	Fatin Nurfatehah Mat Salleh (MAS)	327	347	674	40	14
28	—	Kanoknapus Kaewchomphu (THA)	338	336	674	34	12
29	20	Puspita Zaman (BAN)	336	336	672	34	9
30	21	Cheng Hung Ting (HKG)	336	335	671	36	13
31	22	Andrea Robles (PHI)	333	338	671	34	17
32	—	Kodchaporn Pratumsuwan (THA)	335	336	671	34	5
33	23	Lê Phạm Ngọc Anh (VIE)	336	335	671	31	13
34	—	Viktoriya Lyan (KAZ)	328	342	670	37	14
35	24	Amna Al-Awadhi (UAE)	339	330	669	31	14
36	—	Firstalitha Kyla Widaputri (INA)	333	335	668	29	13
37	—	Shamoli Ray (BAN)	332	334	666	27	9
38	—	Voòng Phương Thảo (VIE)	339	322	661	31	6
39	25	Battsetsegiin Batdulam (MGL)	332	328	660	27	9
40	26	Wong Yuk Sheung (HKG)	331	328	659	30	9
41	—	Susmita Banik (BAN)	321	338	659	27	8
42	27	Madeleine Ong (SGP)	336	319	655	23	5
43	—	Luk Yin Yi (HKG)	326	325	651	24	10
44	28	Hanan Al-Mayyas (KUW)	325	326	651	20	8
45	29	Imayung Rai (NEP)	328	319	647	22	8
46	30	Reem Al-Neama (QAT)	321	318	639	24	8
47	—	Lee Wai Hong (HKG)	319	319	638	17	5
48	31	Sükhbatyn Mönkh-Erdene (MGL)	314	320	634	17	4
49	—	Orkhony Binderiya (MGL)	320	313	633	20	9
50	32	Joumana Al-Najjar (UAE)	304	321	625	17	7
51	33	Anuradha Karunaratne (SRI)	313	310	623	12	7

=== Knockout round ===
==== Finals ====
Semifinals
1	Jyothi Surekha (IND)	149
4	Aditi Swami (IND)	146
6	Ratih Zilizati Fadhly (INA)	142
2	So Chae-won (KOR)	145

Gold medal match
1	Jyothi Surekha (IND)	149
2	So Chae-won (KOR)	145
Bronze medal match
4	Aditi Swami (IND)	146
6	Ratih Zilizati Fadhly (INA)	140

==== Section 1 ====
1/32 eliminations
33	Anuradha Karunaratne (SRI)	135
32	Joumana Al-Najjar (UAE)	127

1/16 eliminations
1	Jyothi Surekha (IND)	145
33	Anuradha Karunaratne (SRI)	132
17	Nichaphat Bunyapalin (THA)	139
16	Fatimah Saad (IRQ)	140
9	Adel Zhexenbinova (KAZ)	142
24	Amna Al-Awadhi (UAE)	139
25	Battsetsegiin Batdulam (MGL)	136
8	Contessa Loh (SGP)	143

1/8 eliminations
1	Jyothi Surekha (IND)	146
16	Fatimah Saad (IRQ)	141
9	Adel Zhexenbinova (KAZ)	145
8	Contessa Loh (SGP)	143

Quarterfinals
1	Jyothi Surekha (IND)	147
9	Adel Zhexenbinova (KAZ)	144

==== Section 2 ====
1/32 eliminations

1/16 eliminations
5	Chen Yi-hsuan (TPE)	143
28	Hanan Al-Mayyas (KUW)	135
21	Cheng Hung Ting (HKG)	140
12	Amaya Cojuangco (PHI)	145
13	Syahara Khoerunisa (INA)	145
20	Puspita Zaman (BAN)	143
29	Imayung Rai (NEP)	137
4	Aditi Swami (IND)	149

1/8 eliminations
5	Chen Yi-hsuan (TPE)	144^{9}
12	Amaya Cojuangco (PHI)	144^{10}
13	Syahara Khoerunisa (INA)	146
4	Aditi Swami (IND)	148

Quarterfinals
12	Amaya Cojuangco (PHI)	143
4	Aditi Swami (IND)	149

==== Section 3 ====
1/32 eliminations

1/16 eliminations
3	Oh Yoo-hyun (KOR)	145
30	Reem Al-Neama (QAT)	134
19	Fatin Nurfatehah Mat Salleh (MAS)	140
14	Kanyavee Maneesombatkul (THA)	141
11	Nguyễn Thị Hải Châu (VIE)	145
22	Andrea Robles (PHI)	136
27	Madeleine Ong (SGP)	137
6	Ratih Zilizati Fadhly (INA)	147

1/8 eliminations
3	Oh Yoo-hyun (KOR)	147
14	Kanyavee Maneesombatkul (THA)	143
11	Nguyễn Thị Hải Châu (VIE)	142
6	Ratih Zilizati Fadhly (INA)	143

Quarterfinals
3	Oh Yoo-hyun (KOR)	148^{9}
6	Ratih Zilizati Fadhly (INA)	148^{10}

==== Section 4 ====
1/32 eliminations

1/16 eliminations
7	Huang I-jou (TPE)	145
26	Wong Yuk Sheung (HKG)	139
23	Lê Phạm Ngọc Anh (VIE)	138^{9}
10	Gisa Baibordi (IRI)	138^{10}
15	Elmira Raissova (KAZ)	140
18	Bonna Akter (BAN)	141
31	Sükhbatyn Mönkh-Erdene (MGL)	123
2	So Chae-won (KOR)	143

1/8 eliminations
7	Huang I-jou (TPE)	144^{9}
10	Gisa Baibordi (IRI)	144^{10}
18	Bonna Akter (BAN)	140
2	So Chae-won (KOR)	143

Quarterfinals
10	Gisa Baibordi (IRI)	144
2	So Chae-won (KOR)	148
