= Archery at the 2018 Asian Games – Mixed team compound =

Mixed team compound at the 2018 Asian Games
- Venue: Gelora Bung Karno Archery Field
- Dates: 22–27 August 2018
- Competitors: 106 from 17 nations

Medalists
gold medal	Pan Yu-ping; Chen Yi-hsuan	Chinese Taipei
silver medal	Kim Jong-ho; So Chae-won	South Korea
bronze medal	Nima Mahboubi; Fereshteh Ghorbani	Iran

The mixed team compound archery competition at the 2018 Asian Games was held from 22 to 27 August at Gelora Bung Karno Archery Field.

A total of 17 teams participated in the ranking round to determine the seeds for knockout round.

Ranking round classification was ranked based on the combined score of the best men and women archer in the individual ranking round.

== Schedule ==
All times are Western Indonesia Time (UTC+07:00)

Date	Time	Event
Wednesday, 22 August 2018	09:00	Ranking round women
Wednesday, 22 August 2018	14:20	Ranking round men
Friday, 24 August 2018	10:40	1/16 eliminations
Friday, 24 August 2018	11:05	1/8 eliminations
Friday, 24 August 2018	15:10	Quarterfinals
Friday, 24 August 2018	16:30	Semifinals
Monday, 27 August 2018	13:50	Bronze medal match
Monday, 27 August 2018	14:10	Gold medal match

== Results ==
Legend

- M — Men
- W — Women

=== Ranking round ===
Rank	Team	Half		Total	10s	Xs
Rank	Team	1st	2nd	Total	10s	Xs
1	South Korea (KOR)	704	708	1412	117	48
M	Choi Yong-hee	354	355	709	61	28
M	Hong Sung-ho	~~351~~	~~356~~	~~707~~	~~60~~	~~19~~
M	Kim Jong-ho	~~348~~	~~350~~	~~698~~	~~51~~	~~30~~
M	Kim Tae-yoon	~~350~~	~~350~~	~~700~~	~~53~~	~~26~~
W	Choi Bo-min	~~352~~	~~349~~	~~701~~	~~53~~	~~29~~
W	Kim Yun-hee	~~349~~	~~350~~	~~699~~	~~51~~	~~21~~
W	So Chae-won	350	353	703	56	20
W	Song Yun-soo	~~350~~	~~351~~	~~701~~	~~53~~	~~20~~
2	India (IND)	707	702	1409	113	45
M	Sangampreet Singh Bisla	~~342~~	~~347~~	~~689~~	~~45~~	~~15~~
M	Rajat Chauhan	~~344~~	~~347~~	~~691~~	~~44~~	~~20~~
M	Aman Saini	~~343~~	~~349~~	~~692~~	~~44~~	~~21~~
M	Abhishek Verma	353	351	704	56	22
W	Trisha Deb	~~341~~	~~342~~	~~683~~	~~38~~	~~23~~
W	Muskan Kirar	~~350~~	~~341~~	~~691~~	~~45~~	~~21~~
W	Madhumita Kumari	~~346~~	~~343~~	~~689~~	~~46~~	~~13~~
W	Jyothi Surekha	354	351	705	57	23
3	Chinese Taipei (TPE)	704	702	1406	112	55
M	Chen Hsiang-hsuan	~~337~~	~~343~~	~~680~~	~~36~~	~~16~~
M	Lin Che-wei	~~349~~	~~347~~	~~696~~	~~49~~	~~21~~
M	Lin Hsin-min	~~344~~	~~344~~	~~688~~	~~43~~	~~20~~
M	Pan Yu-ping	350	350	700	54	29
W	Chen Li-ju	~~345~~	~~345~~	~~690~~	~~46~~	~~17~~
W	Chen Yi-hsuan	354	352	706	58	26
W	Huang I-jou	~~347~~	~~340~~	~~687~~	~~43~~	~~15~~
W	Lin Ming-ching	~~346~~	~~343~~	~~689~~	~~43~~	~~16~~
4	Malaysia (MAS)	693	706	1399	105	37
M	Alang Arif Aqil	~~342~~	~~338~~	~~680~~	~~39~~	~~13~~
M	Lee Kin Lip	~~346~~	~~341~~	~~687~~	~~42~~	~~16~~
M	Juwaidi Mazuki	348	357	705	57	18
M	Zulfadhli Ruslan	~~336~~	~~338~~	~~674~~	~~34~~	~~11~~
W	Nurul Syazhera Asmi	~~330~~	~~332~~	~~662~~	~~30~~	~~12~~
W	Saritha Cham Nong	~~336~~	~~341~~	~~677~~	~~36~~	~~11~~
W	Fatin Nurfatehah Mat Salleh	345	349	694	48	19
W	Sazatul Nadhirah Zakaria	~~335~~	~~337~~	~~672~~	~~30~~	~~10~~
5	Philippines (PHI)	690	702	1392	99	43
M	Paul Dela Cruz	~~351~~	~~341~~	~~692~~	~~45~~	~~19~~
M	Joseph Vicencio	342	352	694	47	21
M	Earl Yap	~~335~~	~~342~~	~~677~~	~~39~~	~~15~~
W	Amaya Cojuangco	348	350	698	52	22
6	Kazakhstan (KAZ)	692	692	1384	91	29
M	Pavel Fisher	~~345~~	~~343~~	~~688~~	~~42~~	~~13~~
M	Akbarali Karabayev	349	349	698	51	16
M	Sergey Khristich	~~344~~	~~339~~	~~683~~	~~39~~	~~11~~
M	Konstantin Solodovnikov	~~337~~	~~336~~	~~673~~	~~33~~	~~12~~
W	Nina Dudareva	~~340~~	~~338~~	~~678~~	~~34~~	~~8~~
W	Viktoriya Lyan	~~345~~	~~337~~	~~682~~	~~39~~	~~15~~
W	Diana Makarchuk	~~341~~	~~340~~	~~681~~	~~37~~	~~9~~
W	Adel Zhexenbinova	343	343	686	40	13
7	Iran (IRI)	696	688	1384	90	40
M	Esmaeil Ebadi	~~344~~	~~345~~	~~689~~	~~43~~	~~18~~
M	Majid Gheidi	~~343~~	~~342~~	~~685~~	~~38~~	~~8~~
M	Amir Kazempour	~~340~~	~~349~~	~~689~~	~~43~~	~~17~~
M	Nima Mahboubi	350	347	697	50	21
W	Minoo Abedi	~~343~~	~~339~~	~~682~~	~~42~~	~~16~~
W	Parisa Baratchi	~~341~~	~~341~~	~~682~~	~~41~~	~~14~~
W	Raheleh Farsi	~~345~~	~~335~~	~~680~~	~~37~~	~~11~~
W	Fereshteh Ghorbani	346	341	687	40	19
8	Indonesia (INA)	690	687	1377	84	32
M	Yoke Rizaldi Akbar	348	346	694	47	19
M	Indra Prasetyo	~~337~~	~~325~~	~~662~~	~~29~~	~~12~~
M	Muhammad Rindarto	~~339~~	~~341~~	~~680~~	~~38~~	~~18~~
M	Prima Wisnu Wardhana	~~342~~	~~346~~	~~688~~	~~45~~	~~14~~
W	Triya Resky Andriyani	~~334~~	~~339~~	~~673~~	~~33~~	~~7~~
W	Yurike Nina Bonita	~~341~~	~~337~~	~~678~~	~~36~~	~~13~~
W	Sri Ranti	~~340~~	~~341~~	~~681~~	~~38~~	~~14~~
W	Dellie Threesyadinda	342	341	683	37	13
9	Thailand (THA)	686	689	1375	87	39
M	Nitiphum Chatachot	~~344~~	~~336~~	680	~~40~~	~~13~~
M	Dhansarit Itsarangkun	344	348	692	46	23
M	Khwanchai Phohiran	~~334~~	~~324~~	~~658~~	~~27~~	~~8~~
M	Chanchai Pratheepwatanawong	~~326~~	~~336~~	~~662~~	~~28~~	~~11~~
W	Suvaporn Anutaraporn	~~333~~	~~333~~	~~666~~	~~30~~	~~8~~
W	Nareumon Junsook	~~330~~	~~336~~	~~666~~	~~28~~	~~8~~
W	Kanyavee Maneesombatkul	342	341	683	41	16
W	Kodchaporn Pratumsuwan	~~340~~	~~336~~	~~676~~	~~32~~	~~8~~
10	Japan (JPN)	675	691	1366	83	26
M	Kazune Nakamura	340	343	683	43	13
W	Yumiko Honda	335	348	683	40	13
11	Vietnam (VIE)	688	677	1365	79	31
M	Mai Xuân Đức	~~335~~	~~339~~	~~674~~	~~30~~	~~13~~
M	Nguyễn Thanh Tuấn	~~340~~	339	~~679~~	~~41~~	~~11~~
M	Nguyễn Tiến Cương	346	341	687	43	21
W	Châu Kiều Oanh	342	336	678	36	10
W	Lê Phương Thảo	~~337~~	~~339~~	~~676~~	~~31~~	~~10~~
W	Nguyễn Thị Nhật Lệ	~~338~~	~~338~~	~~676~~	~~32~~	~~8~~
12	Bangladesh (BAN)	685	679	1364	76	25
M	Jabed Alam	~~334~~	~~339~~	~~673~~	~~32~~	~~7~~
M	Ashim Kumer Das	347	345	692	44	15
M	Abul Kashem Mamun	~~335~~	~~341~~	~~676~~	~~34~~	~~12~~
W	Bonna Akter	~~335~~	~~336~~	~~671~~	~~35~~	~~13~~
W	Roksana Akter	338	334	672	32	10
W	Suma Biswas	~~329~~	~~325~~	~~654~~	~~26~~	~~9~~
13	Singapore (SGP)	675	688	1363	75	23
M	Ang Han Teng	~~334~~	~~342~~	~~676~~	~~42~~	~~14~~
M	Goh Jun Hui	~~329~~	~~344~~	~~673~~	~~33~~	~~8~~
M	Alan Lee	335	343	678	36	12
M	Pang Toh Jin	~~333~~	~~340~~	~~673~~	~~35~~	~~12~~
W	Christina Gunawan	~~333~~	~~332~~	~~665~~	~~33~~	~~8~~
W	Angeline Lee	~~308~~	~~296~~	~~604~~	~~12~~	~~4~~
W	Contessa Loh	340	345	685	39	11
W	Madeleine Ong	~~305~~	~~312~~	~~617~~	~~13~~	~~1~~
14	Myanmar (MYA)	680	681	1361	79	28
M	Zin Thu Rain Mhu	346	347	693	47	17
W	Hla Hla San	~~328~~	~~334~~	~~662~~	~~25~~	~~10~~
W	Su Su Hlaing	~~338~~	~~329~~	~~667~~	~~30~~	~~6~~
W	Yaw Sein Yah	334	334	668	32	11
15	Iraq (IRQ)	676	676	1352	69	24
M	Eshaq Ibrahim	340	342	682	40	15
W	Fatimah Saad	336	334	670	29	9
16	Laos (LAO)	676	674	1350	70	25
M	Lot Outtaliyung	~~332~~	~~339~~	~~671~~	~~36~~	~~9~~
M	Daliya Saidara	~~334~~	~~343~~	~~677~~	~~35~~	~~12~~
M	Khamvarn Vanlivong	343	341	684	41	15
W	Phone Kamkeo	333	333	666	29	10
17	Mongolia (MGL)	662	636	1298	46	23
M	Lkhamsürengiin Aldar	330	330	660	26	15
M	Dugarjavyn Enkhtüvshin	~~318~~	~~296~~	~~614~~	~~20~~	~~5~~
M	Ganzorigiin Shandan	~~295~~	~~321~~	~~616~~	~~20~~	~~11~~
W	Battsetsegiin Batdulam	332	306	638	20	8
W	Erdenebatyn Enkhtamir	~~317~~	~~321~~	~~638~~	~~16~~	~~5~~
W	Batjargalyn Möngönchimeg	~~298~~	~~311~~	~~609~~	~~11~~	~~4~~

- South Korea replaced Choi Yong-hee with Kim Jong-ho for the knockout round.
- Philippines replaced Joseph Vicencio with Paul Dela Cruz for the knockout round.
- Myanmar replaced Yaw Sein Yah with Su Su Hlaing for the knockout round.

=== Knockout round ===
==== Finals ====
Gold medal match
1	South Korea	150
3	Chinese Taipei	151

Bronze medal match
13	Singapore	152
7	Iran	155

==== Top half ====
1/16 eliminations
17	Mongolia	136
16	Laos	141

1/8 eliminations
1	South Korea	157
16	Laos	151
9	Thailand	152
8	Indonesia	153
5	Philippines	154
12	Bangladesh	149
13	Singapore	153
4	Malaysia	152

Quarterfinals
1	South Korea	153
8	Indonesia	148
5	Philippines	147
13	Singapore	149

Semifinals
1	South Korea	156
13	Singapore	152

==== Bottom half ====
1/16 eliminations

1/8 eliminations
3	Chinese Taipei	156
14	Myanmar	148
11	Vietnam	151
6	Kazakhstan	155
7	Iran	152^{19}
10	Japan	152^{17}
15	Iraq	147
2	India	155

Quarterfinals
3	Chinese Taipei	151
6	Kazakhstan	149
7	Iran	155
2	India	153

Semifinals
3	Chinese Taipei	153
7	Iran	138
