= 2025 World Archery Championships – Women's team compound =

Women's team compound at the 2025 World Archery Championships
- Venue: Gwangju International Archery Center
- Location: Gwangju, South Korea
- Dates: 6–7 September
- Competitors: 75 from 25 nations

Medalists
| gold medal | Andrea Becerra; Mariana Bernal; Adriana Castillo | Mexico |
| silver medal | Olivia Dean; Alexis Ruiz; Sydney Sullenberger | United States |
| bronze medal | Viktoriya Lyan; Roxana Yunussova; Adel Zhexenbinova | Kazakhstan |

The women's team compound competition at the 2025 World Archery Championships, which will take place from 6 to 7 September 2025 in Gwangju, South Korea.

== Schedule ==
All times are in Korea Standard Time (UTC+09:00).

| Date | Time | Round |
|---|---|---|
| Friday, 5 September | | Official practice |
| Saturday, 6 September | 09:00; 14:15; 14:45; 15:15; 15:45 | Qualification round First Round; Second round Quarterfinals; Semifinals |
| Sunday, 7 September | 14:55; 15:21 | Bronze-medal match Gold-medal match |

== Qualification round ==
High green denotes at least one round bye.
Light green denotes entering from first round.

| Rank | Nation | Name | Score |
|---|---|---|---|
| 1 | South Korea | Han Seung-yeon; Sim Soo-in; So Chae-won | 2110 |
| 2 | Mexico | Andrea Becerra; Mariana Bernal; Adriana Castillo | 2100 |
| 3 | India | Parneet Kaur; Prithika Pradeep; Jyothi Surekha Vennam | 2100 |
| 4 | United States | Olivia Dean; Alexis Ruiz; Sydney Sullenberger | 2096 |
| 5 | Indonesia | Nurisa Dian Ashrifah; Yurike Nina Bonita Pereira; Ratih Zilizati Fadhly | 2095 |
| 6 | Estonia | Lisell Jäätma; Meeri-Marita Paas; Maris Tetsmann | 2087 |
| 7 | Turkey | Hazal Burun; Emine Rabia Oğuz; Begüm Yuva | 2084 |
| 8 | Chinese Taipei | Chen Yi-hsuan; Huang I-jou; Wang Lu-yun | 2081 |
| 9 | Great Britain | Layla Annison; Isabelle Carpenter; Ella Gibson | 2077 |
| 10 | Denmark | Tanja Gellenthien; Sofie Marcussen; Livia Haals Wieth-Knudsen | 2075 |
| 11 | Kazakhstan | Viktoriya Lyan; Roxana Yunussova; Adel Zhexenbinova | 2069 |
| 12 | Spain | Paula Díaz Morillas; Alexa Misis Olivares; Andrea Muñoz | 2067 |
| 13 | Vietnam | Lê Thị Yến Nhi; Nguyễn Thị Kim Anh; Nguyễn Thị Hai Chau | 2060 |
| 14 | Italy | Giulia Di Nardo; Andrea Nicole Moccia; Elisa Roner | 2058 |
| 15 | France | Léa Girault; Chloé Leroy; Ambre Puiseux | 2056 |
| 16 | El Salvador | Camila Alvarenga; Paola Corado; Sofía Paiz | 2053 |
| 17 | Bangladesh | Bonna Akter; Most Kulsum Akther Mone; Puspita Zaman | 2052 |
| 18 | Germany | Marie Marquardt; Katharina Raab; Jennifer Walter | 2049 |
| 19 | Sweden | Ami Fransson; Ida Karlsson; Jennifer Winsenne | 2048 |
| 20 | Australia | Georgina Graham; Rhiannon Mills; Anna Twining | 2046 |
| 21 | Brazil | Larissa Aparecida Ferrari Oliveira; Camila Hikari Harada; Bianca Rodrigues | 2040 |
| 22 | Poland | Sandra Jankowska; Marzena Nowak; Magdalena Zygmunciak | 2024 |
| 23 | Hong Kong | Cheng Hung Ting; Wang Cheuk Ying; Wong Yuk Sheung | 2000 |
| 24 | Philippines | Vanesa Caparas; Amaya Amparo Cojuangco; Michiko Brianna Gonzales | 1976 |
| 25 | Iceland | Anna Maria Alfreðsdóttir; Þórdís Unnur Bjarkadóttir; Eowyn Mamalias | 1972 |

== Elimination round ==
1/12 finals
17 | Bangladesh | 228
16 | El Salvador | 232
9 | Great Britain | 237
24 | Philippines | 223
21 | Brazil | 222
12 | Spain | 231
13 | Vietnam | 225
20 | Australia | 229
19 | Sweden | 229
14 | Italy | 230
11 | Kazakhstan | 229
22 | Poland | 227
23 | Hong Kong | 219
10 | Denmark | 224
15 | France | 233
18 | Germany | 232

1/8 finals
1 | South Korea | 229
16 | El Salvador | 231
9 | Great Britain | 231
8 | Chinese Taipei | 224
5 | Indonesia | 234
12 | Spain | 233
20 | Australia | 226
4 | United States | 234
3 | India | 229
14 | Italy | 233
11 | Kazakhstan | 230
6 | Estonia | 226
7 | Turkey | 226
10 | Denmark | 231
15 | France | 232^{28}
2 | Mexico | 232^{29}

Quarterfinals
16 | El Salvador | 230
9 | Great Britain | 231
5 | Indonesia | 231^{29}
4 | United States | 231^{30}
14 | Italy | 227
11 | Kazakhstan | 228
10 | Denmark | 231
2 | Mexico | 232

Semifinals
9 | Great Britain | 230
4 | United States | 234
11 | Kazakhstan | 231^{29}
2 | Mexico | 231^{30}

Final
4 | United States | 231
2 | Mexico | 236
Bronze medal
9 | Great Britain | 228
11 | Kazakhstan | 232
