= Archery at the 2022 Asian Games – Women's team compound =

Women's team compound at the 2022 Asian Games
- Venue: Fuyang Yinhu Sports Centre
- Dates: 1–5 October 2023
- Competitors: 38 from 10 nations

Medalists
gold medal	India; Parneet Kaur, Jyothi Surekha, Aditi Swami
silver medal	Chinese Taipei; Chen Yi-hsuan, Huang I-jou, Wang Lu-yun
bronze medal	South Korea; Cho Su-a, Oh Yoo-hyun, So Chae-won

The women's team compound archery competition at the 2022 Asian Games was held from 1 to 5 October 2023 at Fuyang Yinhu Sports Centre.

A total of 10 nations participated in the ranking round. Each team consisted of the highest ranked three athletes from the qualification round.

== Schedule ==
All times are China Standard Time (UTC+08:00)

Date	Time	Event
Sunday, 1 October 2023	09:00	Qualification round
Monday, 2 October 2023	10:00	1/8 eliminations
Thursday, 5 October 2023	08:40	Quarterfinals
Thursday, 5 October 2023	10:20	Semifinals
Thursday, 5 October 2023	11:10	Bronze medal match
Thursday, 5 October 2023	11:35	Gold medal match

== Results ==
=== Qualification round ===
Rank	Team	Half		Total	10s	Xs
Rank	Team	1st	2nd	Total	10s	Xs
1	India (IND)	1044	1043	2087	150	66
	Avneet Kaur	~~340~~	~~345~~	~~685~~	~~42~~	~~12~~
	Parneet Kaur	343	344	687	43	18
	Jyothi Surekha	355	349	704	57	34
	Aditi Swami	346	350	696	50	14
2	South Korea (KOR)	1045	1042	2087	146	62
	Cho Su-a	348	343	691	45	16
	Oh Yoo-hyun	348	349	697	49	23
	So Chae-won	349	350	699	52	23
	Song Yun-soo	~~346~~	~~338~~	~~684~~	~~42~~	~~25~~
3	Chinese Taipei (TPE)	1040	1033	2073	138	60
	Chen Li-ju	~~342~~	~~344~~	~~686~~	~~44~~	~~15~~
	Chen Yi-hsuan	348	347	695	49	21
	Huang I-jou	346	344	690	44	21
	Wang Lu-yun	346	342	688	45	18
4	Indonesia (INA)	1026	1023	2049	125	53
	Ratih Zilizati Fadhly	345	345	690	46	16
	Syahara Khoerunisa	343	340	683	42	22
	Sri Ranti	338	338	676	37	15
	Firstalitha Kyla Widaputri	~~333~~	~~335~~	~~668~~	~~29~~	~~13~~
5	Kazakhstan (KAZ)	1020	1025	2045	114	57
	Viktoriya Lyan	~~328~~	~~342~~	~~670~~	~~37~~	~~14~~
	Elmira Raissova	341	340	681	34	18
	Roxana Yunussova	333	342	675	36	19
	Adel Zhexenbinova	346	343	689	44	20
6	Thailand (THA)	1013	1018	2031	108	44
	Nichaphat Bunyapalin	336	340	676	35	15
	Kanoknapus Kaewchomphu	338	336	674	34	12
	Kanyavee Maneesombatkul	339	342	681	39	17
	Kodchaporn Pratumsuwan	~~335~~	~~336~~	~~671~~	~~34~~	~~5~~
7	Vietnam (VIE)	1018	998	2016	103	38
	Lê Phạm Ngọc Anh	336	335	671	31	13
	Nguyễn Thị Hải Châu	343	341	684	41	19
	Voòng Phương Thảo	339	322	661	31	6
8	Bangladesh (BAN)	1008	1006	2014	95	26
	Bonna Akter	340	336	676	34	8
	Susmita Banik	~~321~~	~~338~~	~~659~~	~~27~~	~~8~~
	Shamoli Ray	332	334	666	27	9
	Puspita Zaman	336	336	672	34	9
9	Hong Kong (HKG)	993	988	1981	90	32
	Cheng Hung Ting	336	335	671	36	13
	Lee Wai Hong	~~319~~	~~319~~	~~638~~	~~17~~	~~5~~
	Luk Yin Yi	326	325	651	24	10
	Wong Yuk Sheung	331	328	659	30	9
10	Mongolia (MGL)	966	961	1927	64	22
	Battsetsegiin Batdulam	332	328	660	27	9
	Orkhony Binderiya	320	313	633	20	9
	Sükhbatyn Mönkh-Erdene	314	320	634	17	4

=== Knockout round ===
1/8 eliminations
9	Hong Kong	225
8	Bangladesh	218
7	Vietnam	228
10	Mongolia	205

Quarterfinals
1	India	231
9	Hong Kong	220
5	Kazakhstan	229
4	Indonesia	232
3	Chinese Taipei	227
6	Thailand	226
7	Vietnam	211
2	South Korea	236

Semifinals
1	India	233
4	Indonesia	219
3	Chinese Taipei	230
2	South Korea	224

Gold medal match
1	India	230
3	Chinese Taipei	229
Bronze medal match
4	Indonesia	229
2	South Korea	232
