= Rishabh Yadav =

Indian compound archer (born 2002)

Personal information
- Born: 13 August 2002 (age 24) Gurugram, Haryana, India
- Education: MBA (Amity University); BA (Delhi University)
- Height: 1.83 m (6 ft 0 in)
- Weight: 72 kg (159 lb)

Sport
- Sport: Archery
- Event: Compound
- Coached by: Abhishek Verma

Achievements and titles
- Highest world ranking: 4 (2025)
- Personal bests: Individual: 716 (2025); Mixed team: 1431 WR (2025)
Medal record
Men's compound archery
Representing India
World Games
Bronze medal – third place	2025 Chengdu	Individual
World Championships
Gold medal – first place	2025 Gwangju	Team
Silver medal – second place	2025 Gwangju	Mixed team
World Cup
Gold medal – first place	2025 Central Florida	Mixed team
Gold medal – first place	2025 Shanghai	Team
Bronze medal – third place	2025 Central Florida	Team
Bronze medal – third place	2025 Shanghai	Individual
Bronze medal – third place	2025 Madrid	Mixed team
Asian Championships
Silver medal – second place	2021 Bangladesh	Mixed team
Bronze medal – third place	2021 Bangladesh	Team
Asia Cup
Gold medal – first place	2022 Iraq	Team
Silver medal – second place	2022 Iraq	Individual
Silver medal – second place	2022 Thailand	Individual
Silver medal – second place	2022 Thailand	Team
World University Games
Bronze medal – third place	2021 Chengdu	Team
World Youth Championships
Bronze medal – third place	2021 Poland	Individual

Rishabh Yadav (born 13 August 2002) is an Indian compound archer. He has won medals at the World Championships, World Cup the Asian Championships. In 2025, he partnered with Jyothi Surekha to set the mixed team world record with a score of 1431 at the World Cup.

== Career ==
=== World record ===
In July 2025, he took part in the fourth and final stage of the Archery World Cup at Madrid, Spain, where he performed well in the qualification rounds of both individual and team events to take the top seeding. Later, he combined with Jyothi Surekha to take the top seeding in the team event. On way to creating a world record in the final, he shot up a tally of 716 points, hitting 68 out of 72 arrows in the 10-point ring, including 35 Xs in the bulls eye. It was his career-best score in an international event. The Indian archers totalled 1431 (70 Xs) in the qualification and broke the mixed team 144-arrow score at 1429, a record held by Denmark's Tanja Gellenthien and Mathias Fullerton which they shot at the Krakow-Malopolska European Games in 2023.

Earlier in May 2025, he bagged his first World Cup individual medal, a bronze medal at Shanghai, China.

In April 2025, he bagged a gold medal in the team event along with Jyothi Surekha in the first stage Archer World Cup round held at Auburndale, USA. In the knockout rounds in US, the duo defeated Spain (156–149), Denmark (156–154), and Slovenia (159–155) to reach the final, where they beat Chinese Taipei.

=== 2024 ===
In the fourth stage of the 2024/25 Indoor World Series at Nîmes, France, Rishabh bagged a silver medal in the compound event men category. He scored 148 but lost to Austria's Nico Wiener, who hit a total of 149 points.

=== 2022 ===
Rishabh earned two silver medals in individual and men's team categories at Archery Asia Cup 2022 Stage 1 in Thailand. He also secured a gold and silver medal in men's team and individual categories at Archery Asia Cup Stage 2 in Iraq. He represented India at Senior World Archery Championship 2022 in USA.

=== 2021 ===
At the 2021 World Archery Youth Championships at Wrocław, Poland, he won the bronze medal in the men's compound archery event. On 17 November 2021, he won the bronze medal in the men's compound archery team event along with Abhishek Verma and Aman Saini and a silver medal in the mixed team event with Jyothi Surekha Vennam at the 22nd Asian Archery Championship in Dhaka, Bangladesh.

== See also ==
- Indian Archers
- Archery in India
