= 2001 Asian Archery Championships =

International archery tournament

- Host city: Hong Kong
- Dates: 10–15 December 2001

The 2001 Asian Archery Championships was the 12th edition of the event. It was held in Hong Kong from 10 to 15 December 2001 and was organized by Asian Archery Federation.

== Medal summary ==
=== Recurve ===
| Event | Gold | Silver | Bronze |
|---|---|---|---|
| Men's individual | Kim Won-sub; South Korea | Yuji Hamano; Japan | Park Kyung-mo; South Korea |
| Men's team | South Korea | China | Kazakhstan |
| Women's individual | Zhang Juanjuan; China | Woo Song-i; South Korea | Xu Linlin; China |
| Women's team | Chinese Taipei | South Korea | China |

=== Compound ===
| Event | Gold | Silver | Bronze |
|---|---|---|---|
| Men's individual | Wang Chih-hao; Chinese Taipei | Michael Soo; Malaysia | Juan Chu-chung; Chinese Taipei |
| Men's team | Chinese Taipei | Philippines | Singapore |
| Women's individual | Huang I-ting; Chinese Taipei | Yen Haiu-pi; Chinese Taipei | Yap Chow Kam; Hong Kong |
| Women's team | Chinese Taipei | Hong Kong | None awarded |

== Medal table ==
| Rank | Nation | Gold | Silver | Bronze | Total |
|---|---|---|---|---|---|
| 1 | Chinese Taipei | 5 | 1 | 1 | 7 |
| 2 | South Korea | 2 | 2 | 1 | 5 |
| 3 | China | 1 | 1 | 2 | 4 |
| 4 | Hong Kong | 0 | 1 | 1 | 2 |
| 5 | Japan | 0 | 1 | 0 | 1 |
| 5 | Malaysia | 0 | 1 | 0 | 1 |
| 5 | Philippines | 0 | 1 | 0 | 1 |
| 8 | Kazakhstan | 0 | 0 | 1 | 1 |
| 8 | Singapore | 0 | 0 | 1 | 1 |
| Totals (9 entries) | | 8 | 8 | 7 | 23 |
