= Aditi Swami =

Indian archer (born 2006)

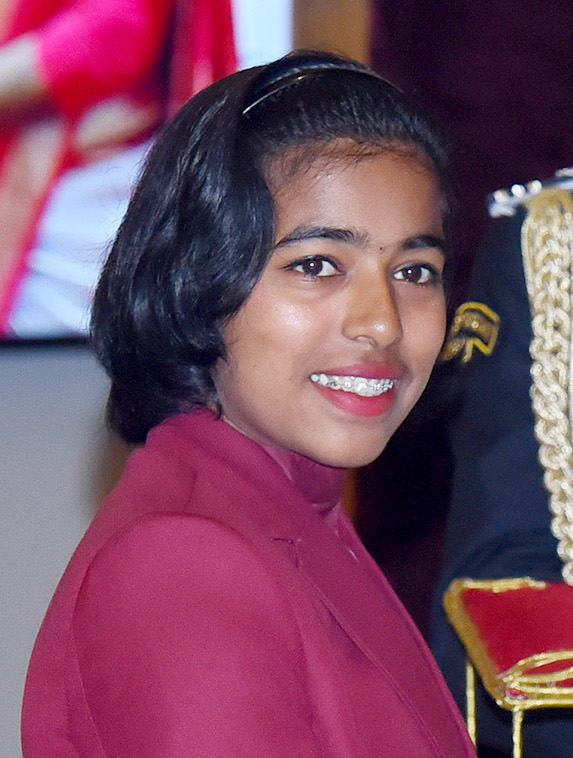
- Swami in 2024

Personal information
- Full name: Aditi Gopichand Swami
- Nationality: Indian
- Born: 15 June 2006 (age 20) Satara, Maharashtra, India
- Height: 1.58 m (5 ft 2 in)

Sport
- Sport: Archery
- Event: Compound
- Coached by: Sergio Pagni

Achievements and titles
- Highest world ranking: 7 (2023)
- Personal best: 149 AGR (2023), 711
Medal record
Women's compound archery
Representing India
World Championships
Gold medal – first place	2023 Berlin	Individual
Gold medal – first place	2023 Berlin	Team
World Cup
Gold medal – first place	2023 Paris	Team
Gold medal – first place	2024 Shanghai	Team
Gold medal – first place	2024 Yecheon	Team
Gold medal – first place	2024 Antalya	Team
Bronze medal – third place	2023 Medellín	Team
Asian Games
Gold medal – first place	2022 Hangzhou	Team
Bronze medal – third place	2022 Hangzhou	Individual
Asian Championships
Gold medal – first place	2023 Bangkok	Mixed team
Gold medal – first place	2023 Bangkok	Team
Asia Cup
Gold medal – first place	2022 Sulaymaniyah	Team
Gold medal – first place	2022 Sharjah	Team
Gold medal – first place	2024 Baghdad	Mixed team
Silver medal – second place	2022 Sharjah	Individual
Silver medal – second place	2022 Phuket	Team
Silver medal – second place	2024 Baghdad	Team
Bronze medal – third place	2024 Baghdad	Individual
World Youth Championships
Gold medal – first place	2023 Limerick	Individual
Gold medal – first place	2023 Limerick	Team

Aditi Swami (born 15 June 2006) is an Indian compound archer. She won the gold medal in the women's individual compound event at the 2023 World Championships, becoming the first Indian female archer to achieve this feat.

== Early life ==
Aditi Swami's father Gopichand, a maths teacher, moved to Satara from a village nearby to support her daughter's training. When she was 12, he took her to the city's Shahu Stadium to introduce her into sports. She saw children playing football and training in athletics but she chose Archery which was being practiced by a small group at one corner. Later, she trained under coach Pravin Sawant in a sugar cane field.

== Career ==
Aditi Swami became the youngest World Champion in archery at the age of 17 winning the Compound women's final in 2023 in the World Cup era (post-2006) She was also part of the winning team of India's first ever World Archery Championships in the Women's team Compound event, along with Jyothi Surekha Vennam and Parneet Kaur.

She won two gold medals at the 2023 World Archery Youth Championships. In 2023, she was also part of the gold medal-winning Indian team at the Asian Games 2022.

== Awards ==
She received Arjuna Award from the President of India on 9 January 2024. She received Shivchhatripati state sports award from Governor of Maharashtra in 2025
