= Archery at the 2025 SEA Games =

- Venue: Archery Field, Huamark Sports Complex
- Location: Bang Kapi, Bangkok, Thailand
- Dates: 14–18 December 2025

Archery competitions at the 2025 SEA Games took place at Archery Field, Huamark Sports Complex in Bang Kapi, Bangkok, from 14 to 18 December 2025.

== Schedule ==
R	Ranking round	E	Elimination rounds	F	Finals

Event↓/Date →	14th Sun	15th Mon	16th Tue	17th Wed	18th Thu
Men's individual recurve	R		E	F	
Men's individual compound	R	E			F
Men's team recurve	R		E	F	
Men's team compound	R	E			F
Women's individual recurve	R		E	F	
Women's individual compound	R	E			F
Women's team recurve	R		E	F	
Women's team compound	R	E			F
Mixed team recurve	R		E	F	
Mixed team compound	R	E			F

== Medal table ==
* Host nation (Thailand)

Rank	Nation	Gold	Silver	Bronze	Total
1	Indonesia	6	0	2	8
2	Thailand*	2	1	2	5
3	Malaysia	1	4	2	7
4	Singapore	1	2	0	3
5	Vietnam	0	3	4	7
Totals (5 entries)		10	10	10	30

== Medalists ==
=== Recurve ===
Event	Gold	Silver	Bronze
Men's individual	Riau Ega Agata; Indonesia	Quik Chern Xin; Malaysia	Nguyễn Minh Đức; Vietnam
Women's individual	Diananda Choirunisa; Indonesia	Triệu Huyền Điệp; Vietnam	Lộc Thị Đào; Vietnam
Men's team	Indonesia; Riau Ega Agata; Arif Dwi Pangestu; Ahmad Khoirul Baasith	Vietnam; Lê Quốc Phong; Nguyễn Duy; Nguyễn Minh Đức	Malaysia; Quik Chern Xin; Muhammad Syafiq Busthamin; Muhamad Zarif Syahiir Zolkepeli
Women's team	Indonesia; Diananda Choirunisa; Rezza Octavia; Ayu Mareta Dyasari	Malaysia; Ariana Nur Dania Zairi; Joey Tan Xing Lei; Ku Nurin Afiqah Ku Ruzaini	Vietnam; Đỗ Thị Ánh Nguyệt; Lộc Thị Đào; Triệu Huyền Điệp
Mixed team	Singapore; Li Yue Long; Tabitha Yeo	Malaysia; Muhammad Syafiq Busthamin; Ariana Nur Dania Zairi	Indonesia; Riau Ega Agata; Ayu Mareta Dyasari

=== Compound ===
Event	Gold	Silver	Bronze
Men's individual	Peerawat Pattanapongkiat; Thailand	Mohd Juwaidi Mazuki; Malaysia	Sippakorn Kohkaew; Thailand
Women's individual	Nurisa Dian Ashrifah; Indonesia	Madeleine Ong Xue Li; Singapore	Ng Sui Kim; Malaysia
Men's team	Malaysia; Alang Ariff Aqil Ghazalli; Mohd Juwaidi Mazuki; Muhammad Aiman Syafiq Tariki	Thailand; Sippakorn Kohkaew; Peerawat Pattanapongkiat; Ratanadanai Wongtana	Vietnam; Đặng Công Đức; Nguyễn Ngọc Dung; Nguyễn Trọng Hải
Women's team	Indonesia; Ratih Zilizati Fadhly; Yurike Nina Bonita Pereira; Nurisa Dian Ashrifah	Singapore; Jeannice Low Wan Qi; Ellie Low Teng Teng; Madeleine Ong Xue Li	Thailand; Kanoknapus Kaewchomphu; Kanyavee Maneesombatkul; Kodchaporn Pratumsuwan
Mixed team	Thailand; Peerawat Pattanapongkiat; Kanyavee Maneesombatkul	Vietnam; Đặng Công Đức; Lê Phạm Vân Anh	Indonesia; Prima Wisnu Wardhana; Nurisa Dian Ashrifah
