= 2023 World Archery Youth Championships =

- Location: (Republic of Ireland) Limerick, Ireland
- Start date: 1 July 2023
- End date: 9 July 2023

The 2023 World Archery Youth Championships was the 17th edition of World Archery Youth Championships. The event was held in Limerick, Ireland 1-9 July 2023, and was organised by World Archery. Junior events were held for those under 21, and Cadet for those under 18.

== Medal table ==
* Host nation (Ireland)

Rank	Nation	Gold	Silver	Bronze	Total
1	South Korea	6	4	1	11
2	India	6	1	4	11
3	United States	3	3	4	10
4	France	1	1	1	3
4	Mexico	1	1	1	3
6	Denmark	1	0	1	2
7	Japan	1	0	0	1
7	Latvia	1	0	0	1
9	China	0	3	1	4
10	Slovenia	0	2	0	2
11	Great Britain	0	1	2	3
12	Chinese Taipei	0	1	1	2
12	Turkey	0	1	1	2
14	Israel	0	1	0	1
14	Lithuania	0	1	0	1
16	Germany	0	0	1	1
16	Poland	0	0	1	1
16	South Africa	0	0	1	1
Totals (18 entries)		20	20	20	60

== Medal summary ==
=== Junior ===
==== Recurve ====
Event	Gold	Silver	Bronze
Men's individual	Parth Salunkhe; India	Song In-jun; South Korea	Mathias Kramer; Germany
Women's individual	Oh Ye-jin; South Korea	Yeom Hye-jeong; South Korea	Bhajan Kaur; India
Men's team	South Korea; Won Jong-hyuk; Song In-jun; Lee Jeong-han	China; Li Mengqi; Aierdensang; Qin Wangyu	Japan; Yuya Funahashi; Fumiya Saito; Yota Kawasaki
Women's team	South Korea; Yeom Hye-jeong; Oh Ye-jin; Seo Bo-eun	France; Caroline Lopez; Victoria Sebastian; Amélie Cordeau	Poland; Aleksandra Ozdoba; Klaudia Płaza; Barbara Grzybek
Mixed Team	South Korea; Yeom Hye-jeong; Won Jong-hyuk	Chinese Taipei; Li Tsai-chi; Huang Li-cheng	India; Ridhi; Parth Salunkhe

==== Compound ====
Event	Gold	Silver	Bronze
Men's individual	Priyansh Kumar; India	Aljaž Matija Brenk; Slovenia	Mathias Fullerton; Denmark
Women's individual	Sydney Sullenberger; United States	Hazal Burun; Turkey	Hallie Boulton; Great Britain
Men's team	Denmark; Mathias Fullerton; Tore Bjarnarson; Rasmus Bramsen	Slovenia; Aljaž Matija Brenk; Tim Jevšnik; Matija Rožič	United States; Sawyer Sullivan; Isaac Sullivan; Nathaniel Wilken
Women's team	India; Anveet Kaur; Parneet Kaur; Pragati	Mexico; Adriana Castillo; María Jiménez Valdez; Selene Rodríguez	United States; Sydney Sullenberger; Carson Krahe; Makenna Proctor
Mixed Team	India; Anveet Kaur; Priyansh Kumar	Israel; Shamai Yamrom; Romi Maymon	Great Britain; Ajay Scott; Patience Wood

=== Cadet ===
==== Recurve ====
Event	Gold	Silver	Bronze
Men's individual	Romans Sergejevs; Latvia	Choi Chul-jun; South Korea	Baptiste Addis; France
Women's individual	Yun Soo-hee; South Korea	Zhu Jingyi; China	Dünya Yenihayat; Turkey
Men's team	France; Baptiste Addis; Jules Pedoux; Alexis Renaudineau	South Korea; Ji Ye-chan; Choi Woo-seok; Choi Chul-jun	India; Ujjwal Dhama; Goldi Mishra; Agastay Singh
Women's team	South Korea; Yun Soo-hee; Kim Ha-eun; Yu Seul-ha	China; Zhu Jingyi; Bao Yijing; Li Sihan	Chinese Taipei; Fong You-jhu; Lin Shu-yan; Chiang Yu-tung
Mixed Team	Japan; Aoi Wada; Kosei Shirai	United States; Gabrielle Sasai; Christian Stoddard	China; Zhi Jingyuan; Zhu Jingyi

==== Compound ====
Event	Gold	Silver	Bronze
Men's individual	Dewey Hathaway; United States	Jonas Grigaravičius; Lithuania	Franco De Wet; South Africa
Women's individual	Aditi Gopichand Swami; India	Leann Drake; United States	Liko Arreola; United States
Men's team	Mexico; Víctor Portillo; Elías Reyes; Rafael Muñoz	India; Manav Jadhao; Pawan Gat; Ganesh Thirumuru	United States; Dewey Hathaway; Grady Kane; Landyn Cox
Women's team	India; Aishwarya Sharma; Aditi Gopichand Swami; Ekta Rani	United States; Olivia Dean; Liko Arreola; Leann Drake	Mexico; Regina Bernal; Valentina García Gómez; Lia Carolina Lugo
Mixed Team	United States; Dewey Hathaway; Olivia Dean	Great Britain; Isabella Bruguier; Ioan Rees	India; Aishwarya Sharma; Manav Ganeshrao Jadhao
