= Archery at the 2002 Asian Games – Men's individual =

Men's individual recurve at the 2002 Asian Games
- Venue: Gangseo Archery Field
- Dates: 6–9 October 2002
- Competitors: 54 from 16 nations

Medalists
gold medal	Hiroshi Yamamoto	Japan
silver medal	Yuji Hamano	Japan
bronze medal	Im Dong-hyun	South Korea

The men's individual recurve competition at the 2002 Asian Games in Busan, South Korea was held from 6 to 9 October at the Gangseo Archery Field.

== Schedule ==
All times are Korea Standard Time (UTC+09:00)

Date	Time	Event
Sunday, 6 October 2002	14:30	Qualification 90 m
Sunday, 6 October 2002	16:00	Qualification 70 m
Monday, 7 October 2002	14:30	Qualification 50 m
Monday, 7 October 2002	16:00	Qualification 30 m
Wednesday, 9 October 2002	09:00	1/16 finals
Wednesday, 9 October 2002	10:40	1/8 finals
Wednesday, 9 October 2002	14:00	Quarterfinals
Wednesday, 9 October 2002	15:20	Semifinals
Wednesday, 9 October 2002	16:00	3rd–4th place
Wednesday, 9 October 2002	16:20	Final

== Results ==
Legend

- DNS — Did not start

=== Qualification ===
Rank	Seed	Athlete	Distance				Total	10s	Xs
Rank	Seed	Athlete	90m	70m	50m	30m	Total	10s	Xs
1	1	Kim Kyung-ho (KOR)	325	344	321	351	1341	71	30
2	2	Im Dong-hyun (KOR)	311	329	339	357	1336	70	28
3	3	Hiroshi Yamamoto (JPN)	312	339	333	352	1336	67	21
4	—	Han Seung-hoon (KOR)	304	339	331	352	1326	70	26
5	—	Kim Sek-keoan (KOR)	296	338	336	355	1325	70	25
6	4	Stanislav Zabrodskiy (KAZ)	307	332	331	350	1320	61	25
7	5	Yuji Hamano (JPN)	310	329	327	350	1316	60	26
8	6	Marvin Cordero (PHI)	313	333	326	344	1316	59	22
9	7	Rinzin Chhophel (BHU)	303	327	334	350	1314	58	20
10	8	Kailash Sharma (IND)	295	333	337	348	1313	61	12
11	9	Chen Hongyuan (CHN)	300	333	328	352	1313	58	18
12	10	Huang Zhongsheng (CHN)	302	334	326	348	1310	60	21
13	—	Li Xiaofeng (CHN)	307	327	325	346	1305	59	24
14	—	Xue Haifeng (CHN)	291	323	332	357	1303	60	23
15	11	Satyadev Prasad (IND)	309	327	322	345	1303	58	26
16	12	Chen Szu-yuan (TPE)	295	320	329	358	1302	61	25
17	—	Limba Ram (IND)	305	328	323	345	1301	68	28
18	13	Tashi Peljor (BHU)	313	322	318	339	1292	46	13
19	—	Koichi Shiota (JPN)	317	320	314	340	1291	49	12
20	14	Liao Chien-nan (TPE)	303	320	315	351	1289	47	18
21	15	Majid Mirrahimi (IRI)	308	321	314	345	1288	51	15
22	16	Maxim Yelisseyev (KAZ)	303	327	323	334	1287	47	15
23	17	Jantsangiin Gantögs (MGL)	294	323	321	347	1285	52	20
24	18	Nan Aung (MYA)	297	312	322	349	1280	55	12
25	19	Christian Cubilla (PHI)	301	321	313	345	1280	40	16
26	20	Lockoneco (INA)	303	321	314	340	1278	53	18
27	21	Zamir Ahmedov (UZB)	300	323	310	342	1275	41	17
28	—	Alexandr Li (KAZ)	294	317	319	342	1272	51	13
29	22	Yan Aung Soe (MYA)	294	315	321	341	1271	41	16
30	—	Ved Kumar (IND)	292	316	319	344	1271	48	18
31	23	Farhan Monser (QAT)	271	328	328	342	1269	48	6
32	24	Ildar Sayfullin (UZB)	286	323	313	345	1267	47	19
33	—	Wang Cheng-pang (TPE)	300	313	313	338	1264	37	10
34	—	Amet Umerov (UZB)	282	321	318	340	1261	47	12
35	—	Yoshimasa Inoue (JPN)	290	307	304	348	1249	43	18
36	—	Nyi Nyi Tun (MYA)	279	315	308	345	1247	42	22
37	—	Liu Ming-huang (TPE)	280	316	310	341	1247	37	16
38	—	Tashi Dorji (BHU)	280	312	318	330	1240	34	5
39	25	Gombodorjiin Gan-Erdene (MGL)	293	302	307	335	1237	36	10
40	—	Win Min Zaw (MYA)	289	305	303	336	1233	32	12
41	—	Vitaliy Shin (KAZ)	280	289	317	344	1230	41	19
42	26	Ali Ahmed Salem (QAT)	263	311	311	342	1227	38	7
43	—	Togoogiin Tsogtbayar (MGL)	267	314	292	330	1203	24	4
44	—	Tempa Tempa (BHU)	257	300	300	332	1189	30	7
45	—	Florante Matan (PHI)	276	314	320	277	1187	35	5
46	—	Arnold Rojas (PHI)	270	313	299	272	1154	16	3
47	—	Baatarjavyn Zolboo (MGL)	245	274	295	310	1124	17	8
48	27	P. C. N. N. Rajawardana (SRI)	227	266	292	327	1112	21	7
49	—	Ahmed Al-Abadi (QAT)	250	248	282	331	1111	23	8
50	28	Rajeeva Wickramasinghe (SRI)	237	270	285	315	1107	29	10
51	—	Abdulla Abdulla (QAT)	227	285	278	281	1071	9	0
52	—	Hetti Bandara Dharmasena (SRI)	233	260	254	315	1062	15	4
53	29	Damir Kurmaev (TJK)	210	243	271	322	1046	18	4
—	—	Prasad Fernando (SRI)					DNS		

=== Knockout round ===
==== Finals ====
Final
5	Yuji Hamano (JPN)	106
3	Hiroshi Yamamoto (JPN)	113

3rd–4th place
9	Chen Hongyuan (CHN)	108
2	Im Dong-hyun (KOR)	114

==== Top half ====
1/16 finals
17	Jantsangiin Gantögs (MGL)	158
16	Maxim Yelisseyev (KAZ)	164
9	Chen Hongyuan (CHN)	164
24	Ildar Sayfullin (UZB)	161
25	Gombodorjiin Gan-Erdene (MGL)	152
8	Kailash Sharma (IND)	161
5	Yuji Hamano (JPN)	168
28	Rajeeva Wickramasinghe (SRI)	153
21	Zamir Ahmedov (UZB)	151
12	Chen Szu-yuan (TPE)	154
13	Tashi Peljor (BHU)	159
20	Lockoneco (INA)	160
29	Damir Kurmaev (TJK)	147
4	Stanislav Zabrodskiy (KAZ)	163

1/8 finals
1	Kim Kyung-ho (KOR)	161
16	Maxim Yelisseyev (KAZ)	162
9	Chen Hongyuan (CHN)	162
8	Kailash Sharma (IND)	159
5	Yuji Hamano (JPN)	165
12	Chen Szu-yuan (TPE)	161
20	Lockoneco (INA)	167
4	Stanislav Zabrodskiy (KAZ)	169

Quarterfinals
16	Maxim Yelisseyev (KAZ)	103
9	Chen Hongyuan (CHN)	109
5	Yuji Hamano (JPN)	112
4	Stanislav Zabrodskiy (KAZ)	111

Semifinals
9	Chen Hongyuan (CHN)	107
5	Yuji Hamano (JPN)	111

==== Bottom half ====
1/16 finals
19	Christian Cubilla (PHI)	161
14	Liao Chien-nan (TPE)	157
11	Satyadev Prasad (IND)	158
22	Yan Aung Soe (MYA)	162
27	P. C. N. N. Rajawardana (SRI)	136
6	Marvin Cordero (PHI)	165
7	Rinzin Chhophel (BHU)	166
26	Ali Ahmed Salem (QAT)	153
23	Farhan Monser (QAT)	148
10	Huang Zhongsheng (CHN)	164
15	Majid Mirrahimi (IRI)	153
18	Nan Aung (MYA)	157

1/8 finals
3	Hiroshi Yamamoto (JPN)	167
19	Christian Cubilla (PHI)	166
22	Yan Aung Soe (MYA)	165
6	Marvin Cordero (PHI)	160
7	Rinzin Chhophel (BHU)	162
10	Huang Zhongsheng (CHN)	160
18	Nan Aung (MYA)	161
2	Im Dong-hyun (KOR)	168

Quarterfinals
3	Hiroshi Yamamoto (JPN)	110
22	Yan Aung Soe (MYA)	104
7	Rinzin Chhophel (BHU)	111^{8}
2	Im Dong-hyun (KOR)	111^{9}

Semifinals
3	Hiroshi Yamamoto (JPN)	110
2	Im Dong-hyun (KOR)	108
