= 2024 Pan American Archery Championships =

- Location: Medellín, Colombia
- Dates: 9 to 14 April 2024

The 2024 Pan American Archery Championships took place in Medellín, Colombia, from 9 to 14 April 2024.

== Medal summary ==
=== Recurve ===
Event	Gold	Silver	Bronze
Men's individual	Matías Grande; Mexico	Jackson Mirich; United States	Jack Williams; United States
Women's individual	Casey Kaufhold; United States	Alejandra Valencia; Mexico	Virginie Chénier; Canada
Men's team	Colombia; Santiago Arcila; Jorge Enríquez; Andrés Hernández	Canada; Crispin Duenas; Devaang Gupta; Eric Peters	United States; Gabriel Anderson; Brady Ellison; Jack Williams
Women's team	United States; Catalina GNoriega; Casey Kaufhold; Jennifer Mucino-Fernandez	Mexico; Ángela Ruiz; Alejandra Valencia; Ana Paula Vázquez	Brazil; Ana Luiza Caetano; Graziela dos Santos; Ana Machado
Mixed team	Brazil; Ana Luiza Caetano; Marcus Vinicius D'Almeida	Mexico; Alejandra Valencia; Matías Grande	Canada; Virginie Chénier; Eric Peters

=== Compound ===
Event	Gold	Silver	Bronze
Men's individual	Sebastián García; Mexico	José Marcelo del Cid; Guatemala	Pablo Gómez; Colombia
Women's individual	Alexis Ruiz; United States	Dafne Quintero; Mexico	Sara López; Colombia
Men's team	Mexico; Sebastián García; Lot Máximo Méndez; Juan del Río	Guatemala; Julio Barillas; José Marcelo del Cid; Pedro Salazar	Colombia; Sebastián Arenas; Juan Bonilla; Pablo Gómez
Women's team	United States; Olivia Dean; Carson Krahe; Alexis Ruiz	El Salvador; Camila Alvarenga; Paola Colorado; Sofía Paiz	Mexico; Andrea Becerra; Dafne Quintero; Esmeralda Sánchez
Mixed team	United States; Alexis Ruiz; Sawyer Sullivan	Colombia; Sara López; Sebastián Arenas	Puerto Rico; Paola Ramírez; Jean Pizarro

=== Barebow ===
Event	Gold	Silver	Bronze
Men's individual	Raymond Huang; Canada	Marwin Martínez; Colombia	Danny Quintero; Colombia
Women's individual	Cindy Czako; United States	Christina Lyons; United States	Carla Roseli Martins Dias Bicalho; Brazil
Men's team	Colombia; Marwin Martínez; Danny Quintero; Ricardo Paz	Brazil; De Alkmim Dias Rafael; Felipe Jose Dias Bicalho; Fábio Wnuk Hollerbach Klier	United States; Marcus Cooley; Patrick Fisk; Matthew Seidemann
Mixed team	United States; Cindy Czako; Marcus Cooley	Brazil; Carla Roseli Martins Dias Bicalho; De Alkmim Dias Rafael	Colombia; Paola Escallon; Marwin Martínez

== Medal table ==
* Host nation (Colombia)

Rank	Nation	Gold	Silver	Bronze	Total
1	United States	7	2	3	12
2	Mexico	3	4	1	8
3	Colombia*	2	2	5	9
4	Brazil	1	2	2	5
5	Canada	1	1	2	4
6	Guatemala	0	2	0	2
7	El Salvador	0	1	0	1
8	Puerto Rico	0	0	1	1
Totals (8 entries)		14	14	14	42
