= Archery at the 2023 Pan American Games – Qualification =

The following is the qualification system and qualified athletes, countries and teams for the Archery at the 2023 Pan American Games competitions.

== Qualification system ==
A total of 98 archers will qualify to compete at the games (49 per gender). A country may enter a maximum of ten archers (five per gender). As host nation, Chile qualifies eight athletes automatically (3 for the men's and women's recurve event each, 1 for the men's and women's compound event each).

The present Qualification System has been designed to ensure 8 recurve teams and 5 compound teams of each gender, as well as the participation of individual archers from as many countries as possible. For this reason, a country can qualify either a 3-archers team or just one archer.

As provided for the Olympic Games, a country cannot participate with two archers in one category for Santiago, except if one of the archers qualified at the Pan American Junior Games in Cali.

As there are countries (Colombia, Venezuela, Panama and Guyana) whose geographical location allows them to compete at the South American Games and the Central American and Caribbean Games, their National Federations must inform World Archery Americas by July 31, 2022, in which of these two Games they want to be considered for Pan American Games qualifying positions. This information must be provided in writing and must be accompanied by a letter of approval of their respective National Olympic Committee.

As Canada and the United States do not compete in any of the Regional Games, they will be the only countries eligible to earn spots in the North American Qualifier.

=== Recurve ===
A country may enter a maximum of three recurve athletes per gender (for a maximum of six total). As host, Chile automatically receives three quotas per gender. At the first qualification tournament, the top five teams in the team event qualify along with three individuals per gender. At the second qualification tournament, the top two team along with two individuals will qualify per gender. If a country that won an individual quota(s) at the first tournament, wins a team quota at the second tournament, those individual spots will be reallocated to the second qualification individual event.

=== Compound ===
A country may enter a maximum of two compound athletes per gender (for a maximum of four total). As host, Chile automatically receives one quota per gender. The top five two-member teams in the first qualification tournament will qualify along with one individual per gender. The remaining spot per gender will be decided at the second qualification tournament.

== Qualification timeline ==
Events	Date	Venue
2021 Junior Pan American Games	25 c 28 November 2021	(Colombia) Cali–Valle
2022 South American Games	1–15 October 2022	(Paraguay) Asunción
North American Qualifier	21–27 November 2022	(Chile) Santiago
Pan American Archery Championship	21–27 November 2022	(Chile) Santiago
Copa Merengue	11–15 April 2023	(Dominican Republic) Santo Domingo
2023 Central American and Caribbean Games	2 – 6 July 2023	(El Salvador) Santa Tecla

== Qualification summary ==
Nation	Men				Women				Mixed		Total
Nation	I. recurve	T. recurve	I. compound	T. compound	I. recurve	T. recurve	I. compound	T. compound	T. recurve	T. compound	Athletes
Argentina	1		1		1				X		3
Brazil	3	X	1		3	X	2	X	X	X	9
Canada	3	X	2	X	3	X			X		8
Chile	3	X	1		3	X	1		X	X	8
Colombia	3	X	2	X	3	X	2	X	X	X	10
Cuba	3	X			3	X			X		6
Dominican Republic					1						1
Ecuador	1				1		1		X		3
El Salvador	1		2	X	1		2	X	X	X	6
Guatemala	3	X	2	X	1		1		X	X	7
Guyana	1										1
Mexico	3	X	2	X	4	X	3	X	X	X	12
Peru	1				1		1		X		3
Puerto Rico	1		1		1		1		X	X	4
United States	4	X	2	X	3	X	2	X	X	X	11
Venezuela	1				3	X			X		4
Virgin Islands	1				1				X		2
Total: 17 NOCs	33	8	16	6	33	8	16	5	15	8	98

== Recurve men ==
Event	Qualified	Archers per NOC	Total
Host nation	Chile	1	3
2021 Junior Pan American Games	United States	1	1
2022 South American Games	—	0	0
North American Qualifier	—	0	0
Pan American Archery Championship	Mexico; Colombia; United States; Canada; Brazil	3	15
Pan American Archery Championship	~~Cuba*~~; Puerto Rico; Virgin Islands; Argentina	1	~~4~~ 3
Qualification event	Cuba*; Guatemala	3	6
Qualification event	Ecuador; El Salvador; Venezuela; Guyana; Peru	1	~~3~~ 5
2023 Central American and Caribbean Games	—	~~1~~ 0	~~1~~ 0
TOTAL			33

- Cuba later qualified a men's team and therefore the individual quota was added to the Copa Merengue event.
- No eligible athlete finished in the top 8 at the 2023 Central American and Caribbean Games, meaning the last spot was awarded to next eligible athlete from the Copa Merengue.

== Recurve women ==
Event	Qualified	Archers per NOC	Total
Host nation	Chile	1	3
2021 Junior Pan American Games	Mexico	1	1
2022 South American Games	—	0	0
North American Qualifier	—	0	0
Pan American Archery Championship	United States; Mexico; Canada; Brazil; Colombia	3	15
Pan American Archery Championship	~~Cuba~~; ~~Venezuela~~; Peru; Virgin Islands	1	~~4~~ 2
Qualification event	Cuba; Venezuela	3	6
Qualification event	Guatemala; Ecuador; Argentina; Puerto Rico; El Salvador	1	~~3~~ 5
2023 Central American and Caribbean Games	Dominican Republic	1	1
TOTAL			33

- Cuba and Venezuela later qualified a team and therefore the individual quotas were added to the Copa Merengue event.

== Compound men ==
Event	Qualified	Archers per NOC	Total
Host nation	Chile	1	1
2021 Junior Pan American Games	Mexico	1	1
2022 South American Games	Argentina	1	1
Pan American Archery Championship	Colombia; United States; Guatemala; El Salvador; Canada	2	10
Pan American Archery Championship	Puerto Rico	1	1
Qualification event	Brazil	1	1
2023 Central American and Caribbean Games	Mexico	1	1
TOTAL			16

== Compound women ==
Event	Qualified	Archers per NOC	Total
Host nation	Chile	1	1
2021 Junior Pan American Games	Mexico	1	1
2022 South American Games	—	0	0
Pan American Archery Championship	Colombia; Mexico; United States; El Salvador; Brazil	2	10
Pan American Archery Championship	Peru; Ecuador	1	2
Qualification event	Puerto Rico	1	1
2023 Central American and Caribbean Games	Guatemala	1	1
TOTAL			16
