= 2023 Asian Archery Championships =

Sporting event

- Host city: Bangkok, Thailand
- Dates: 5–9 November 2023

The 2023 Asian Archery Championships were the 23rd edition of the championships, and was held in Bangkok, Thailand from 5 November to 9 November 2023.

== Medal summary ==
=== Recurve ===
Event	Gold	Silver	Bronze
Men's individual	Kim Woo-jin; South Korea	Tang Chih-chun; Chinese Taipei	Lee Woo-seok; South Korea
Men's team	South Korea; Kim Je-deok; Kim Woo-jin; Lee Woo-seok	Kazakhstan; Ilfat Abdullin; Alexandr Yeremenko; Dauletkeldi Zhangbyrbay	Indonesia; Riau Ega Agata; Arif Dwi Pangestu; Alviyanto Prastyadi
Women's individual	Choi Mi-sun; South Korea	Lim Si-hyeon; South Korea	Li Jiaman; China
Women's team	South Korea; An San; Choi Mi-sun; Lim Si-hyeon	China; An Qixuan; Hailigan; Li Jiaman	India; Ankita Bhakat; Bhajan Kaur; Tisha Punia
Mixed team	South Korea; Lee Woo-seok; Lim Si-hyeon	China; Qi Xiangshuo; Li Jiaman	Japan; Takaharu Furukawa; Tomomi Sugimoto

=== Compound ===
Event	Gold	Silver	Bronze
Men's individual	Andrey Tyutyun; Kazakhstan	Kim Jong-ho; South Korea	Abhishek Verma; India
Men's team	South Korea; Choi Yong-hee; Kim Jong-ho; Yang Jae-won	Kazakhstan; Akbarali Karabayev; Sergey Khristich; Andrey Tyutyun	India; Prathamesh Fuge; Priyansh Kumar; Abhishek Verma
Women's individual	Parneet Kaur; India	Jyothi Surekha; India	Huang I-jou; Chinese Taipei
Women's team	India; Parneet Kaur; Jyothi Surekha; Aditi Swami	Chinese Taipei; Chen Yi-hsuan; Huang I-jou; Wang Lu-yun	South Korea; Cho Su-a; Oh Yoo-hyun; So Chae-won
Mixed team	India; Priyansh Kumar; Aditi Swami	Thailand; Nawayut Lertruangsilp; Kanoknapus Kaewchomphu	South Korea; Yang Jae-won; So Chae-won

== Medal table ==
Rank	Nation	Gold	Silver	Bronze	Total
1	South Korea	6	2	3	11
2	India	3	1	3	7
3	Kazakhstan	1	2	0	3
4	China	0	2	1	3
4	Chinese Taipei	0	2	1	3
6	Thailand	0	1	0	1
7	Indonesia	0	0	1	1
7	Japan	0	0	1	1
Totals (8 entries)		10	10	10	30
