= Virginie Chénier =

Canadian recurve archer (born 1994)

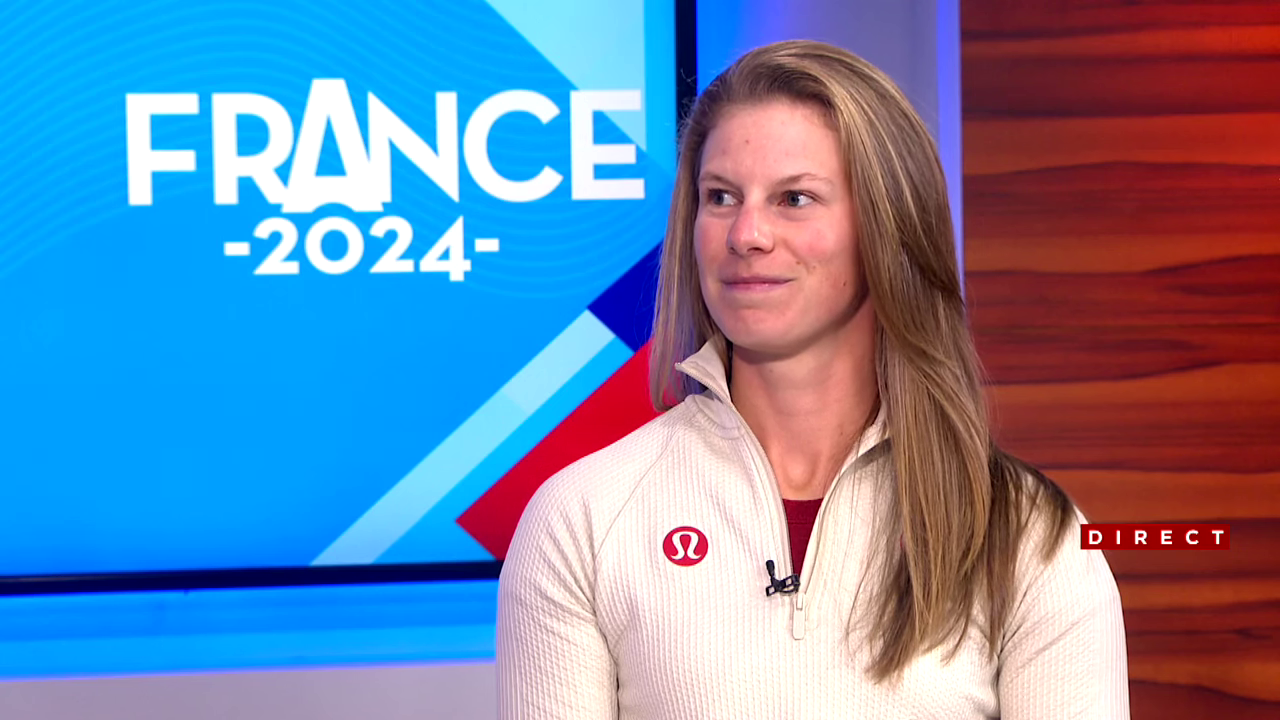
- Virginie Chénier in 2024

Personal information
- Born: September 12, 1994 (age 32) Montreal, Quebec, Canada
- Height: 171 cm (5 ft 7 in)

Sport
- Sport: Archery

Achievements and titles
- Personal best: 652 (qualification round)
Medal record
Women's recurve archery
Representing Canada
Pan American Archery Championships
Bronze medal – third place	2022 Santiago	Team
Bronze medal – third place	2024 Medellín	Individual
Bronze medal – third place	2024 Medellín	Mixed team

Virginie Chénier (born September 12, 1994) is a Canadian recurve archer. Chénier has competed for Canada for over 12 years and has won medals at the continental level.

== Career ==
Chénier's personal best in the qualification round is 652. Chénier first competed for Canada on the international stage in 2013. Chénier has competed at three Pan American Games for Canada, with her first appearance being at the 2015 Pan American Games in Toronto. Chénier also competed at the 2019 Pan American Games in Lima, Peru and the 2023 Pan American Games in Santiago, Chile. At the 2023 World Archery Championships, Chénier finished 57th overall in the individual event.

Chénier's 2024 season saw her win two medals at the 2024 Pan American Archery Championships, bronze medals in the individual and mixed team events. In June 2024, Chénier was named to Canada's 2024 Olympic team.
