= 2021 Asian Archery Championships =

International archery tournament

- Host city: Dhaka, Bangladesh
- Dates: 14–19 November 2021

The 2021 Asian Archery Championships were the 22nd edition of the event, and was held at the Bangladesh Army Stadium in Dhaka, Bangladesh from 14 to 19 November 2021.

== Medal summary ==
=== Recurve ===
Event	Gold	Silver	Bronze
Men's individual	Lee Seung-yun; South Korea	Han Woo-tack; South Korea	Lee Woo-seok; South Korea
Men's team	South Korea; Han Woo-tack; Kim Pil-joong; Lee Seung-yun	India; Pravin Jadhav; Kapil; Parth Salunkhe	Bangladesh; Hakim Ahmed Rubel; Ram Krishna Saha; Ruman Shana
Women's individual	Lim Hae-jin; South Korea	Ryoo Su-jung; South Korea	Jung Dasomi; South Korea
Women's team	South Korea; Lim Hae-jin; Oh Ye-jin; Ryoo Su-jung	India; Ankita Bhakat; Ridhi; Madhu Vedwan	Bangladesh; Nasrin Akter; Beauty Ray; Diya Siddique
Mixed team	South Korea; Lee Seung-yun; Ryoo Su-jung	Bangladesh; Hakim Ahmed Rubel; Diya Siddique	India; Kapil; Ankita Bhakat

=== Compound ===
Event	Gold	Silver	Bronze
Men's individual	Kim Jong-ho; South Korea	Abhishek Verma; India	Sergey Khristich; Kazakhstan
Men's team	South Korea; Choi Yong-hee; Kim Jong-ho; Yang Jae-won	Kazakhstan; Akbarali Karabayev; Sergey Khristich; Andrey Tyutyun	India; Aman Saini; Abhishek Verma; Rishabh Yadav
Women's individual	Jyothi Surekha; India	Oh Yoo-hyun; South Korea	Kim Yun-hee; South Korea
Women's team	South Korea; Kim Yun-hee; Oh Yoo-hyun; Song Yun-soo	Iran; Gisa Baibordi; Raheleh Farsi; Kosar Khoshnoudikia	Kazakhstan; Viktoriya Lyan; Diana Makarchuk; Roxana Yunussova
Mixed team	South Korea; Choi Yong-hee; Kim Yun-hee	India; Rishabh Yadav; Jyothi Surekha	Iran; Amir Kazempour; Gisa Baibordi

== Medal table ==
Rank	Nation	Gold	Silver	Bronze	Total
1	South Korea	9	3	3	15
2	India	1	4	2	7
3	Bangladesh	0	1	2	3
3	Kazakhstan	0	1	2	3
5	Iran	0	1	1	2
Totals (5 entries)		10	10	10	30
