= Mariana Bernal =

Mexican archer (born 2003)

Personal information
- Full name: Mariana Bernal Sánchez
- Born: 19 February 2003 (age 23)

Sport
- Country: Mexico
- Sport: Archery
- Event: Compound
Medal record
Representing Mexico
Women's compound archery
World Championships
Gold medal – first place	2025 Gwangju	Team
World Cup
Gold medal – first place	2025 Central Florida	Team
Gold medal – first place	2025 Shanghai	Team
Silver medal – second place	2025 Antalya	Team
Bronze medal – third place	2025 Central Florida	Individual
Pan American Championships
Gold medal – first place	2022 Santiago	Team
Gold medal – first place	2022 Santiago	Mixed team
Bronze medal – third place	2018 Medellín	Individual
World Youth Championships
Gold medal – first place	2021 Wrocław	Junior women's team
Bronze medal – third place	2019 Madrid	Cadet women's team

Mariana Bernal Sánchez (born 19 February 2003) is a Mexican archer who competes in compound events. She is a gold medalist at the World and Pan American Championships.

== Career ==
At the 2018 Pan American Championships, Bernal won her first medal there when she won the bronze medal in the individual event. She competed in the 2019 World Archery Youth Championships, where she won the bronze medal in the cadet women's team event. She made her second and final appearance at the World Archery Youth Championships in 2021, where she won the gold medal in junior women's team event.

At the 2022 Pan American Archery Championships, the Mexican team won the most gold medals during the event. Bernal contributed to this by winning the gold medal in the women's and mixed team events. She competed in the women's compound event at the 2025 World Games held in Chengdu, China where she reached the round of 16. At the 2025 World Archery Championships, she competed in the individual and team events, winning the gold medal in the latter.

On 29 September 2025, Bernal tested positive for the anabolic steroid Nandrolone. As a result, she was stripped of her Finals title from the 2025 World Archery Championship and banned from competition until the 2028 Summer Olympics. On 6 September 2026, she publicly spoke about the incident for the first time in a post on her social media.

== Personal life ==
In June 2026, Bernal revealed on social media that she had received her undergraduate degree in Dentistry from the University of Guadalajara.
