= Nurisa Dian Ashrifah =

Indonesian compound archer

Personal information
- Nationality: Indonesian
- Born: 30 November 2005 (age 20) Semarang, Central Java, Indonesia
- Education: Dian Nuswantoro University

Sport
- Sport: Archery
- Event: Compound

Achievements and titles
- Highest world ranking: 44 (10 November 2025)
Medal record
Women's compound archery
Representing Indonesia
Asian Games
Gold medal – first place	2026 Aichi–Nagoya	Individual
Asia Cup
Bronze medal – third place	2025 Singapore	Mixed team
SEA Games
Gold medal – first place	2025 Thailand	Individual
Gold medal – first place	2025 Thailand	Team
Bronze medal – third place	2025 Thailand	Mixed team

Nurisa Dian Ashrifah (born 30 November 2005) is an Indonesian archer who competes in the compound discipline. She represents Indonesia in international competitions and has competed at the SEA Games and Asian Games.

== Early life and education ==
Ashrifah was born in Semarang. She began practicing archery at the age of 11. She is a student at Dian Nuswantoro University in Semarang.

== Career ==
Ashrifah competed in the archery competition at the 2024 National Games in Aceh and North Sumatra. She represented Central Java in the women's compound events.

At the 2025 World Archery Championships in Gwangju, South Korea, Ashrifah finished ninth in the women's individual compound event after reaching the round of 16. She recorded a qualification score of 698 and defeated Sayaka Kamoda of Japan 146–140 before being eliminated by Jyothi Surekha Vennam after a tied match decided by a tiebreak. Ashrifah won the women's individual compound gold medal at the 2025 SEA Games in Thailand, defeating Singapore's Ong Madeleine Xue Li in the final. She also won gold in the women's compound team event and bronze in the mixed compound team event.

At the 2026 Asian Games in Aichi and Nagoya, Ashrifah won the gold medal in the women's individual compound event. She defeated the Philippines' Amaya Cojuangco in the final on 1 October 2026. The victory gave Indonesia its first Asian Games gold medal in archery.
