= Lockoneco =

Indonesian archer

Personal information
- Born: 19 March 1978 (age 48) South Barito Regency, Central Kalimantan, Indonesia
- Height: 172 cm (5 ft 8 in)
- Weight: 66 kg (146 lb)
Medal record
Men's archery
Representing Indonesia
SEA Games
Silver medal – second place	2005 Manila	Team

Lockoneco (born 19 March 1978 in South Barito Regency) is an archer from Indonesia. He competes in archery.

Lockoneco competed at the 2004 Summer Olympics in men's individual archery. He was defeated in the first round of elimination, placing 45th overall.
