= Olivia Dean (archer) =

American archer (born 2007)

Personal information
- Born: January 19, 2007 (age 19)

Sport
- Sport: Archery
- Event: Compound
Medal record
Women's compound archery
Representing the United States
World Championships
Silver medal – second place	2025 Gwangju	Team
Pan American Championships
Gold medal – first place	2024 Medellín	Team
Bronze medal – third place	2026 Tlaxcala	Team
Pan American Games
Gold medal – first place	2023 Santiago	Team

Olivia Dean (born January 19, 2007) is an American archer who competes in compound events.

== Career ==
In July 2023, Dean competed at the 2023 World Archery Youth Championships and won a gold medal in the mixed team compound and a silver medal in the women's team compound events. In November 2023, she competed at the 2023 Pan American Games and won a gold medal in the women's team compound event, along with Alexis Ruiz.

In April 2024, she competed at the 2024 Pan American Archery Championships and won a gold medal in the women's team compound event. In September 2025, she competed at the 2025 World Archery Championships and won a silver medal in the women's team compound.
