= Archery at the 2025 SEA Games – Women's individual recurve =

Women's individual recurve at the 2025 SEA Games
- Venue: Archery Field, Huamark Sports Complex
- Dates: 14–17 December 2025
- Competitors: 28 from 9 nations

Medalists
| gold medal | Diananda Choirunisa | Indonesia |
| silver medal | Trieu Huyen Diep | Vietnam |
| bronze medal | Loc Thi Dao | Vietnam |

The women's individual recurve competition at the 2025 SEA Games took place at Archery Field, Huamark Sports Complex in Bang Kapi, Bangkok, from 14 to 17 December 2025.

A total of 28 archers participated in the qualification round. Only the top two archers from each country were allowed to progress to the knockout stage.

== Schedule ==
All times are Indochina Time (UTC+07:00)

| Date | Time | Event |
|---|---|---|
| Sunday, 14 December 2025 | 09:00 | Qualification round |
| Tuesday, 16 December 2025 | 09:15 | 1/8 eliminations |
| Tuesday, 16 December 2025 | 09:55 | Quarterfinals |
| Tuesday, 16 December 2025 | 10:35 | Semifinals |
| Wednesday, 17 December 2025 | 13:40 | Bronze medal match |
| Wednesday, 17 December 2025 | 14:00 | Gold medal match |

== Results ==
=== Qualification round ===
| Rank | Seed | Athlete | Half | | Total | 10s | Xs |
| Rank | Seed | Athlete | 1st | 2nd | Total | 10s | Xs |
|---|---|---|---|---|---|---|---|
| 1 | 1 | (Indonesia) Ayu Mareta Dyasari | 336 | 335 | 671 | 31 | 13 |
| 2 | 2 | (Indonesia) Diananda Choirunisa | 333 | 334 | 667 | 28 | 8 |
| 3 | 3 | (Vietnam) Loc Thi Dao | 329 | 331 | 660 | 29 | 9 |
| 4 | 4 | (Malaysia) Ariana Nur Diana Mohamad Zairi | 328 | 327 | 655 | 26 | 7 |
| 5 | 5 | (Vietnam) Trieu Huyen Diep | 318 | 333 | 651 | 21 | 4 |
| 6 | 6 | (Malaysia) Joey Tan Xing Lei | 327 | 322 | 649 | 26 | 9 |
| 7 | — | (Indonesia) Rezza Octavia | 324 | 325 | 649 | 21 | 8 |
| 8 | 7 | (Philippines) Naina Dominique Tagle | 328 | 317 | 645 | 27 | 7 |
| 9 | — | (Myanmar) Ku Nurin Afiqah Ku Ruzaini | 319 | 321 | 640 | 24 | 9 |
| 10 | 8 | (Singapore) Tabitha Ern Lin Yeo | 320 | 320 | 640 | 21 | 5 |
| 11 | — | (Vietnam) Do Thi Anh Nguyet | 325 | 312 | 637 | 21 | 7 |
| 12 | — | (Vietnam) Nguyen Thi Thanh Nhi | 320 | 316 | 636 | 20 | 3 |
| 13 | 9 | (Philippines) Giuliana Vernice Garcia | 323 | 310 | 633 | 21 | 3 |
| 14 | 10 | (Myanmar) Pyae Sone Hnin | 314 | 317 | 631 | 20 | 3 |
| 15 | — | (Malaysia) Syaqiera Mashayikh | 313 | 313 | 626 | 14 | 3 |
| 16 | 11 | (Thailand) Sataporn Artsalee | 313 | 312 | 625 | 18 | 6 |
| 17 | — | (Indonesia) Fathiyya Erista Maharani | 306 | 313 | 619 | 20 | 6 |
| 18 | 12 | (Thailand) Kanyanat Wipadapisut | 306 | 310 | 616 | 15 | 1 |
| 19 | — | (Philippines) Gabrielle Monica Bidaure | 315 | 295 | 610 | 14 | 4 |
| 20 | — | (Thailand) Chunyaphak Kanjana | 312 | 288 | 600 | 17 | 5 |
| 21 | — | (Thailand) Punika Jongkraijak | 301 | 277 | 578 | 16 | 3 |
| 22 | 13 | (Singapore) Kai Ning Ng | 300 | 274 | 574 | 9 | 0 |
| 23 | — | (Singapore) Ruzsicska Natalie Chen Hui Regina | 275 | 272 | 547 | 6 | 2 |
| 24 | 14 | (Laos) Jen Kaboksy | 266 | 263 | 529 | 4 | 1 |
| 25 | 15 | (Timor-Leste) Maia da Cruz Jenifer | 87 | 122 | 209 | 1 | 0 |
| DNS | — | (Philippines) Pia Elizabeth Angela Bidaure | — | — | — | — | — |
| DNS | — | (Myanmar) Cho Cho Zin | — | — | — | — | — |
| DNS | — | (Myanmar) Thidar Nwe | — | — | — | — | — |

=== Knockout round ===
1/8 Eliminations
9 | (Philippines) Giuliana Vernice Garcia | 26 | 27 | 27 | 27 | 1
8 | (Singapore) Tabitha Ern Lin Yeo | 28 | 28 | 27 | 29 | 7
5 | (Vietnam) Trieu Huyen Diep | 27 | 26 | 29 | 30 | 7
12 | (Thailand) Kanyanat Wipadapisut | 23 | 26 | 26 | 28 | 1
13 | (Singapore) Kai Ning Ng | 25 | 17 | 21 | 0
4 | (Malaysia) Ariana Nur Diana Mohamad Zairi | 27 | 26 | 27 | 6
3 | (Vietnam) Loc Thi Dao | 27 | 26 | 25 | 27 | 6
14 | (Laos) Jen Kaboksy | 26 | 27 | 23 | 24 | 2
11 | (Thailand) Sataporn Artsalee | 21 | 23 | 22 | 0
6 | (Malaysia) Joey Tan Xing Lei | 26 | 24 | 27 | 6
7 | (Philippines) Naina Dominique Tagle | 25 | 24 | 23 | 27 | 7
10 | (Myanmar) Pyae Sone Hnin | 25 | 21 | 22 | 26 | 1
15 | (Timor-Leste) Maia da Cruz Jenifer | 6 | 14 | 17 | 0
2 | (Indonesia) Diananda Choirunisa | 28 | 25 | 27 | 6

Quarterfinals
1 | (Indonesia) Ayu Mareta Dyasari | 28 | 27 | 26 | 28 | 28 | 9 | 5
8 | (Singapore) Tabitha Ern Lin Yeo | 26 | 29 | 27 | 27 | 28 | 10 | 6
5 | (Vietnam) Trieu Huyen Diep | 29 | 27 | 28 | 29 | 7
4 | (Malaysia) Ariana Nur Diana Mohamad Zairi | 28 | 26 | 28 | 28 | 1
3 | (Vietnam) Loc Thi Dao | 28 | 26 | 29 | 26 | 29 | 6
6 | (Malaysia) Joey Tan Xing Lei | 27 | 27 | 28 | 28 | 28 | 4
7 | (Philippines) Naina Dominique Tagle | 28 | 26 | 26 | 0
2 | (Indonesia) Diananda Choirunisa | 29 | 29 | 27 | 6

Semifinals
8 | (Singapore) Tabitha Ern Lin Yeo | 28 | 26 | 26 | 26 | 27 | 3
5 | (Vietnam) Trieu Huyen Diep | 28 | 29 | 29 | 25 | 28 | 7
3 | (Vietnam) Loc Thi Dao | 27 | 28 | 27 | 27 | 28 | 3
2 | (Indonesia) Diananda Choirunisa | 27 | 29 | 27 | 27 | 29 | 7

Gold medal match
5 | (Vietnam) Trieu Huyen Diep | 26 | 28 | 27 | 24 | 21 | 4
2 | (Indonesia) Diananda Choirunisa | 29 | 29 | 25 | 22 | 29 | 6
Bronze medal match
8 | (Singapore) Tabitha Ern Lin Yeo | 27 | 26 | 26 | 27 | 27 | 4
3 | (Vietnam) Loc Thi Dao | 29 | 28 | 25 | 27 | 27 | 6
