= Yuji Hamano =

Japanese archer (born 1980)

Personal information
- Born: September 6, 1980 (age 45)

Sport
- Sport: Archery
Medal record
Representing Japan
Asian Games
| Silver medal – second place | 2002 Busan | Individual |

Yuji Hamano (濱野 裕二, Hamano Yūji; born September 6, 1980 in Hiroshima) is a Japanese archer.

He placed 42nd at the 2000 Summer Olympics.

He won a silver medal at the 2002 Asian Games in the men's individual event.

At the 2004 Summer Olympics he was again defeated in the first round of elimination, placing 37th overall in men's individual archery. Later he was a member of the 8th-place Japanese men's archery team.
