= Sydney Sullenberger =

American archer (born 2004)

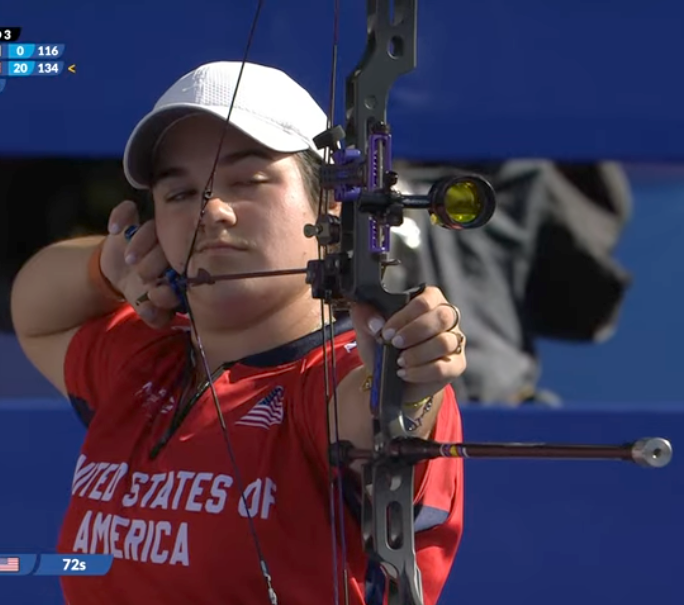
- At the 2025 Summer World University Games

Personal information
- Born: May 28, 2004 (age 22)

Sport
- Sport: Archery
- Event: Compound
Medal record
Women's compound archery
Representing the United States
World Championships
Silver medal – second place	2025 Gwangju	Team
World University Games
Silver medal – second place	2025 Essen	Team

Sydney Sullenberger (born May 28, 2004) is an American archer who competes in compound events.

== Career ==
Sullenberger began her archery career in 2014 at ten years old. In July 2023, she competed at the 2023 World Archery Youth Championships and won a gold medal in the U21 individual compound event, and a bronze medal in the women's team compound event.

In July 2025, she competed at the 2025 Summer World University Games and won a silver medal in the women's team compound event. In September 2025, she competed at the 2025 World Archery Championships and won a silver medal in the women's team compound event.
