= Aman Saini =

Indian archer

Personal information
- Nationality: Indian
- Born: 15 July 1997 (age 28) Nangloi Jat, Delhi, India
- Education: Deen Dayal Upadhyaya College (BA)
- Height: 1.74 m (5 ft 9 in)

Sport
- Sport: Archery
- Event: Compound
Medal record
Men's compound archery
Representing India
World Championships
Gold medal – first place	2025 Gwangju	Team
Asian Games
Silver medal – second place	2018 Jakarta	Team
Asian Championships
Bronze medal – third place	2021 Dhaka	Team
World University Games
Gold medal – first place	2021 Chengdu	Mixed team
Bronze medal – third place	2021 Chengdu	Individual
Bronze medal – third place	2021 Chengdu	Team

Aman Saini (born 15 July 1997) is an Indian compound archer.
