= 2022 Pan American Archery Championships =

- Venue: Escuela Militar
- Location: Santiago, Chile
- Dates: 21 to 27 November 2022

The 2022 Pan American Archery Championships took place in Santiago, Chile, from 21 to 27 November 2022. The competition took place at the Escuela Militar.

The Mexican team won the most gold medals during the event.

== Medal summary ==
=== Recurve ===
Event	Gold	Silver	Bronze
Men's individual	Marcus Vinicius D'Almeida; Brazil	Hugo Franco; Cuba	Matías Grande; Mexico
Women's individual	Ana Paula Vázquez; Mexico	Ane Marcelle Dos Santos; Brazil	Casey Kaufhold; United States
Men's team	Mexico; Ángel Alvarado; Emilio Treviño; Matías Grande	Colombia; Jorge Enríquez; Daniel Pineda; Andrés Pila	United States; Matthew Requa; Jack Williams; Joonsuh Oh
Women's team	Mexico; Aída Román; Ana Paula Vázquez; Alejandra Valencia	United States; Savannah Vanderwier; Casey Kaufhold; Jennifer Mucino-Fernandez	Canada; Stephanie Barrett; Eleanor Brug; Virginie Chénier
Mixed team	Mexico; Matías Grande; Alejandra Valencia	United States; Matthew Requa; Casey Kaufhold	Brazil; Ane Marcelle dos Santos; Marcus Vinicius D'Almeida

=== Compound ===
Event	Gold	Silver	Bronze
Men's individual	Nick Kappers; United States	Miguel Becerra; Mexico	Sawyer Sullivan; United States
Women's individual	Paige Pearce; United States	Paola Corado; El Salvador	Sara López; Colombia
Men's team	United States; James Lutz; Sawyer Sullivan; Nick Kappers	Colombia; Sebastián Arenas; Jagdeep Singh; Pablo Gómez	Guatemala; José Marcelo del Cid; Pedro Salazar; Julio Barillas
Women's team	Mexico; Andrea Becerra; Mariana Bernal; Dafne Quintero	Colombia; María Suárez; Alejandra Usquiano; Sara López	United States; Cassidy Cox; Alexis Ruiz; Paige Pearce
Mixed team	Mexico; Miguel Becerra; Mariana Bernal	Colombia; Sara López; Jagdeep Singh	United States; James Lutz; Paige Pearce

=== Medal table ===
Rank	Nation	Gold	Silver	Bronze	Total
1	Mexico	6	1	1	8
2	United States	3	2	5	10
3	Brazil	1	1	1	3
4	Colombia	0	4	1	5
5	Cuba	0	1	0	1
5	El Salvador	0	1	0	1
7	Canada	0	0	1	1
7	Guatemala	0	0	1	1
Totals (8 entries)		10	10	10	30
