= Adriana Castillo (archer) =

Mexican archer (born 2005)

Personal information
- Born: 19 July 2005 (age 20)

Sport
- Country: Mexico
- Sport: Archery
- Event: Compound
Medal record
Representing Mexico
Women's compound archery
Event	1st	2nd	3rd
World Championships	1	0	0
World Youth Championships	1	1	1
World Cup	1	2	0
Pan American Championships	1	0	0
Junior Pan American Games	1	1	0
Total	5	4	1
World Championships
Gold medal – first place	2025 Gwangju	Team
Pan American Championships
Gold medal – first place	2026 Tlaxcala	Team
World Youth Championships
Gold medal – first place	2025 Winnipeg	Mixed team
Silver medal – second place	2023 Limerick	Team
Bronze medal – third place	2025 Winnipeg	Team
Junior Pan American Games
Gold medal – first place	2025 Asunción	Mixed team
Silver medal – second place	2025 Asunción	Individual

Adriana Castillo (born 19 July 2005) is a Mexican archer who competes in compound events. She won the gold medal in the women's team compound event at the 2025 World Archery Championships.

== Career ==
In August 2025, Castillo competed at the 2025 Junior Pan American Games and won a gold medal in the mixed team event and a silver medal in the individual event. The next month she competed at the 2025 World Archery Championships and won a gold medal in the women's team event.
