= Archery at the 2025 SEA Games – Men's individual recurve =

Men's individual recurve at the 2025 SEA Games
- Venue: Archery Field, Huamark Sports Complex
- Dates: 14–17 December 2025
- Competitors: 29 from 9 nations

Medalists
gold medal	Riau Ega Agata	Indonesia
silver medal	Quik Chern Xin	Malaysia
bronze medal	Nguyen Minh Duc	Vietnam

The men's individual recurve competition at the 2025 SEA Games took place at Archery Field, Huamark Sports Complex in Bang Kapi, Bangkok, from 14 to 17 December 2025.

A total of 29 archers participated in the qualification round. Only the top two archers from each country were allowed to progress to the knockout stage.

== Schedule ==
All times are Indochina Time (UTC+07:00)

Date	Time	Event
Sunday, 14 December 2025	09:00	Qualification round
Tuesday, 16 December 2025	09:15	1/8 eliminations
Tuesday, 16 December 2025	09:55	Quarterfinals
Tuesday, 16 December 2025	10:35	Semifinals
Wednesday, 17 December 2025	14:20	Bronze medal match
Wednesday, 17 December 2025	14:40	Gold medal match

== Results ==
=== Qualification round ===
Rank	Seed	Athlete	Half		Total	10s	Xs
Rank	Seed	Athlete	1st	2nd	Total	10s	Xs
1	1	(Indonesia) Riau Ega Agata	335	337	672	33	18
2	2	(Vietnam) Le Quoc Phong	332	333	665	31	10
3	3	(Indonesia) Arif Dwi Pangestu	332	331	663	31	8
4	4	(Singapore) Li Yue Long	329	333	662	29	10
5	5	(Vietnam) Nguyen Minh Duc	330	331	661	27	8
6	6	(Malaysia) Muhammad Syafiq Busthamin	326	334	660	28	17
7	—	(Indonesia) Ahmad Khoirul Baasith	327	333	660	28	6
8	7	(Malaysia) Chern Xin Quik	327	331	658	20	5
9	8	(Myanmar) Naing Lin Htet	328	327	655	29	9
10	9	(Thailand) Punamfa Chatkanjanarak	330	324	654	30	15
11	—	(Malaysia) Muhamad Zarif Syahiir Zolkepeli	330	323	653	23	7
12	—	(Indonesia) Alviyanto Bagas Prastyadi	315	335	650	21	4
13	—	(Vietnam) Nguyen Duy	322	327	649	22	2
14	—	(Malaysia) Muhamad Haiqal Danish Syamsul Affandi	329	320	649	19	4
15	10	(Myanmar) Htet Zaw Thiha	327	321	648	22	5
16	11	(Philippines) Girvin Cullen Garcia	322	325	647	21	8
17	12	(Philippines) Renian Keith Nawew	321	320	641	21	5
18	13	(Thailand) Tanapat Pathairat	324	316	640	22	7
19	—	(Philippines) Jonathan Ebbinghans Reaport	323	317	640	20	6
20	—	(Thailand) Aitthiwat Soithong	314	325	639	19	6
21	—	(Thailand) Thitiwit Ketmak	315	316	631	23	9
22	—	(Vietnam) Hoang Van Loc	314	315	629	24	11
23	—	(Myanmar) Nay Lin Oo	312	315	627	16	8
24	—	(Myanmar) Khant Maw Kaung	314	307	621	16	5
25	—	(Philippines) Feliciano Jason Emmanuel	308	312	620	15	5
26	14	(Singapore) Han Qian Wong	303	312	615	15	1
27	—	(Singapore) Yu Hern Siam	298	304	602	15	5
28	15	(Laos) Vongphaphone Chanthalath	304	293	597	16	2
29	16	(Timor-Leste) da Cruz Juan Paul Rogimus	118	121	239	0	0

=== Knockout round ===
1/8 Eliminations
1	(Indonesia) Riau Ega Agata	28	29	28	6
16	(Timor-Leste) da Cruz Juan Paul Rogimus	9	17	18	0
9	(Thailand) Punamfa Chatkanjanarak	29	27	28	26	6
8	(Myanmar) Naing Lin Htet	27	24	28	26	2
5	(Vietnam) Nguyen Minh Duc	29	27	29	6
12	(Philippines) Renian Keith Nawew	28	18	26	0
13	(Thailand) Tanapat Pathairat	25	27	23	29	24	4
4	(Singapore) Li Yue Long	27	26	29	27	27	6
3	(Indonesia) Arif Dwi Pangestu	27	27	27	28	7
14	(Singapore) Han Qian Wong	25	26	27	20	1
11	(Philippines) Girvin Cullen Garcia	24	26	25	0
6	(Malaysia) Muhammad Syafiq Busthamin	28	29	28	6
7	(Malaysia) Chern Xin Quik	29	29	29	29	7
10	(Myanmar) Htet Zaw Thiha	28	29	28	28	1
15	(Laos) Vongphaphone Chanthalath	26	22	26	0
2	(Vietnam) Le Quoc Phong	28	28	28	6

Quarterfinals
1	(Indonesia) Riau Ega Agata	27	28	28	29	7
9	(Thailand) Punamfa Chatkanjanarak	27	25	26	26	1
5	(Vietnam) Nguyen Minh Duc	28	26	27	29	29	6
4	(Singapore) Li Yue Long	28	26	29	22	25	4
3	(Indonesia) Arif Dwi Pangestu	25	25	26	0
6	(Malaysia) Muhammad Syafiq Busthamin	26	27	27	6
7	(Malaysia) Chern Xin Quik	29	28	28	29	30	6
2	(Vietnam) Le Quoc Phong	26	29	26	29	30	4

Semifinals
1	(Indonesia) Riau Ega Agata	29	29	28	27	29	7
5	(Vietnam) Nguyen Minh Duc	28	27	29	27	28	3
6	(Malaysia) Muhammad Syafiq Busthamin	28	27	26	29	27	3
7	(Malaysia) Chern Xin Quik	27	29	29	29	29	7

Gold medal match
1	(Indonesia) Riau Ega Agata	27	26	29	28	28	9+	6
7	(Malaysia) Chern Xin Quik	27	25	25	29	30	9	5
Bronze medal match
5	(Vietnam) Nguyen Minh Duc	28	29	25	27	6
6	(Malaysia) Muhammad Syafiq Busthamin	26	28	29	25	2
