= Sofía Paiz =

Salvadoran archer (born 1997)

Personal information
- Full name: Sofía Lourdes Paiz García
- Born: 13 May 1997 (age 29)

Sport
- Country: Guatemala (until 2022); El Salvador (since 2022)
- Sport: Archery
- Event: Compound
Medal record
Women's compound archery
Representing Guatemala
Central American and Caribbean Games
| Gold medal – first place | 2018 Barranquilla | Mixed team |
Representing El Salvador
| Event | 1st | 2nd | 3rd |
|---|---|---|---|
| World Championships | 0 | 1 | 0 |
| CAC Games | 1 | 1 | 0 |
| Bolivarian Games | 0 | 3 | 0 |
| Total | 1 | 5 | 0 |
World Championships
| Silver medal – second place | 2025 Gwangju | Individual |
Central American and Caribbean Games
| Gold medal – first place | 2026 Santo Domingo | Team |
| Silver medal – second place | 2023 San Salvador | Mixed team |
Bolivarian Games
| Silver medal – second place | 2022 Valledupar | Team |
| Silver medal – second place | 2022 Valledupar | Mixed team |
| Silver medal – second place | 2025 Lima-Ayacucho | Mixed team |

Sofía Lourdes Paiz García (born 13 May 1997) is a Salvadoran archer competing in compound events. She won the silver medal in the 2025 World Archery Championship women's individual.

== Career ==
Born in 1997 in Guatemala, in 2022 obtained Salvadoran nationality. She won medals at the Central American and Caribbean Games in 2018 and 2023. Her major result was the silver medal at the 2025 World Archery Championships.
