= Fatin Nurfatehah Mat Salleh =

Malaysian archer (born 1991)

Personal information
- National team: 2009
- Born: 4 June 1991 (age 35)

Sport
- Country: Malaysia
- Sport: Archery
- Event: Compound
Medal record
Women's compound archery
Representing Malaysia
Asian Championships
Bronze medal – third place	2015 Bangkok	Team

Fatin Nurfatehah Mat Salleh (born 4 June 1991) is a Malaysian female compound archer and part of the national team. She won the gold medal at Archery World Cup, Stage 1 (2015). She also won bronze medal at the 2015 Asian Archery Championships in the women's team event.
