= Jyothi Surekha =

Indian compound archer (born 1996)

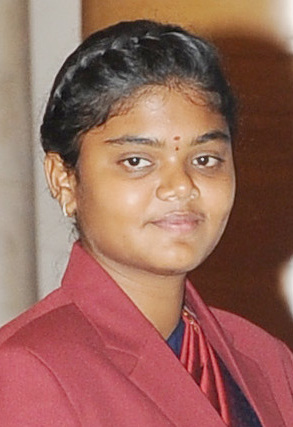
- Jyothi in 2017

Personal information
- Full name: Jyothi Surekha Vennam
- Born: 3 July 1996 (age 30) Challapalli, Andhra Pradesh, India
- Education: B.Tech. MBA

Sport
- Sport: Archery
- Event: Compound

Achievements and titles
- Highest world ranking: 2 (2024)
- Personal bests: Individual: 715 (2025); Mixed team: 1431 WR (2025)
Medal record
Women's compound archery
Representing India
Event	1st	2nd	3rd
World Games	0	0	1
World Championships	1	5	3
World Cup Final	0	2	0
Asian Games	4	1	1
Asian Championships	7	5	2
World Cup	12	8	7
Asia Cup	1	1	0
World University Games	0	1	0
World University Championships	1	0	0
World Youth Championships	0	0	2
Total	26	23	16
World Games
Bronze medal – third place	2022 Birmingham	Mixed team
World Championships
Gold medal – first place	2023 Berlin	Team
Silver medal – second place	2017 Mexico City	Team
Silver medal – second place	2021 Yankton	Individual
Silver medal – second place	2021 Yankton	Mixed team
Silver medal – second place	2021 Yankton	Team
Silver medal – second place	2025 Gwangju	Mixed team
Bronze medal – third place	2019 Hertogenbosch	Individual
Bronze medal – third place	2019 Hertogenbosch	Team
Bronze medal – third place	2023 Berlin	Individual
World Cup Final
Silver medal – second place	2018 Samsun	Mixed team
Silver medal – second place	2025 Nanjing	Individual
Asian Games
Gold medal – first place	2022 Hangzhou	Individual
Gold medal – first place	2022 Hangzhou	Mixed team
Gold medal – first place	2022 Hangzhou	Team
Gold medal – first place	2026 Aichi–Nagoya	Team
Silver medal – second place	2018 Jakarta	Team
Bronze medal – third place	2014 Incheon	Team
Asian Championships
Gold medal – first place	2015 Bangkok	Individual
Gold medal – first place	2017 Dhaka	Team
Gold medal – first place	2019 Bangkok	Mixed team
Gold medal – first place	2021 Dhaka	Individual
Gold medal – first place	2023 Bangkok	Team
Gold medal – first place	2025 Dhaka	Individual
Gold medal – first place	2025 Dhaka	Team
Silver medal – second place	2015 Bangkok	Team
Silver medal – second place	2017 Dhaka	Mixed team
Silver medal – second place	2019 Bangkok	Team
Silver medal – second place	2021 Dhaka	Mixed team
Silver medal – second place	2023 Bangkok	Individual
Bronze medal – third place	2011 Tehran	Team
Bronze medal – third place	2017 Dhaka	Individual
World Cup
Gold medal – first place	2022 Paris	Mixed team
Gold medal – first place	2023 Antalya	Individual
Gold medal – first place	2023 Antalya	Mixed team
Gold medal – first place	2023 Shanghai	Mixed team
Gold medal – first place	2023 Paris	Team
Gold medal – first place	2024 Shanghai	Individual
Gold medal – first place	2024 Shanghai	Mixed team
Gold medal – first place	2024 Shanghai	Team
Gold medal – first place	2024 Yecheon	Team
Gold medal – first place	2024 Antalya	Team
Gold medal – first place	2025 Central Florida	Mixed team
Silver medal – second place	2018 Antalya	Team
Silver medal – second place	2018 Berlin	Team
Silver medal – second place	2022 Paris	Individual
Silver medal – second place	2024 Yecheon	Mixed team
Silver medal – second place	2025 Madrid	Individual
Silver medal – second place	2025 Madrid	Team
Silver medal – second place	2025 Shanghai	Team
Silver medal – second place	2026 Madrid	Team
Bronze medal – third place	2017 Antalya	Mixed team
Bronze medal – third place	2018 Shanghai	Mixed team
Bronze medal – third place	2018 Antalya	Mixed team
Bronze medal – third place	2018 Salt lake City	Mixed team
Bronze medal – third place	2018 Berlin	Mixed team
Bronze medal – third place	2023 Paris	Individual
Bronze medal – third place	2023 Medellín	Team
Bronze medal – third place	2025 Madrid	Mixed team
Asia Cup
Gold medal – first place	2016 Taipei	Mixed team
Silver medal – second place	2016 Taipei	Team
World University Games
Silver medal – second place	2015 Gwangju	Mixed team
World University Championships
Gold medal – first place	2016 Ulaanbaatar	Team
World Youth Championships
Bronze medal – third place	2013 Wuxi	Mixed team
Bronze medal – third place	2013 Wuxi	Team

Jyothi Surekha Vennam (born 3 July 1996) is an Indian compound archer. She has won gold medals at the World Championships, World Cup, Asian Games, and Asian Championships. In 2025, she and Rishabh Yadav set the mixed team world record at the 2025 Archery World Cup.

== Early life and education ==
Surekha was born in Challapalli in Krishna district, Andhra Pradesh to Vennam Surendra Kumar and Sri Durga. Her father is a former kabaddi player and a veterinary doctor in Vijayawada. She started swimming at the age of three and in 2001, she swam 5 km (3.1 mi) across the Krishna River in three hours, 20 minutes and six seconds and became the youngest to enter the Limca Book of Records. She completed her schooling from Nalanda Vidya Niketan, Vijayawada, and did her B.Tech. and MBA from Koneru Lakshmaiah University.

== Career ==
Surekha started practicing archery from the age of 11, participating in various tournaments at the junior level. In 2011, she won a bronze medal at the 2011 Asian Archery Championships held in Tehran, Iran. In 2013, She won two bronze medals at the 2013 World Archery Youth Championships held at Wuxi, China. She had competed in five Asian Archery Championships winning four gold, four silver and two bronze medals. She have also competed in multiple Archery World Cups winning five gold, four silver and seven bronze medals.

Surekha won three silver medals in the 2021 World Archery Championships becoming the first Indian to do so and has won one gold, four silver and three bronze medals in the World Archery Championships. In January 2022, she finished in first place in the Women's Open Pro event at the Lancaster Archery Classic held near Lancaster, Pennsylvania, United States. In 2023, Jyoti won three gold medals in the 2022 Asian Games becoming the first Indian to win multiple gold medals in archery.

In 2025, Surekha and Rishabh Yadav set the mixed team world record with a score of 1431 at the 2025 Archery World Cup. At the 2026 Asian Games, she won the gold medal in the women's team compound event.

== Awards and honours ==
- Pratibha Puraskar by Government of Andhra Pradesh (2001)
- Exceptional Achievement Award by Government of India (2002)
- Golden Target award by World Archery Federation (2013)
- Arjuna Award by Government of India (2017)
- Archer of the Year by Times of India (2021)
- Female Athlete of the Year by ESPN

In 2017, then Chief Minister of Andhra Pradesh N. Chandrababu Naidu awarded her a cash prize of ₹10 million (US$100,000) and a 500 ft^{2} (46 m^{2}) housing plot.
