= 2025 World Archery Championships =

2025 World Championships
- Venue: Gwangju International Archery Center
- Location: Gwangju, South Korea
- Dates: 5–12 September 2025
- Competitors: 501 from 74 nations

The 2025 World Archery Championships were held from 5 to 12 September 2025 in Gwangju, South Korea.

== Medals table ==
* Host nation (South Korea)

Rank	Nation	Gold	Silver	Bronze	Total
1	South Korea*	2	1	4	7
2	Mexico	2	0	1	3
3	Spain	2	0	0	2
4	France	1	1	0	2
4	India	1	1	0	2
6	Chinese Taipei	1	0	0	1
6	Netherlands	1	0	0	1
8	United States	0	2	0	2
9	Japan	0	1	2	3
10	Brazil	0	1	0	1
10	China	0	1	0	1
10	Denmark	0	1	0	1
10	El Salvador	0	1	0	1
14	Colombia	0	0	1	1
14	Kazakhstan	0	0	1	1
14	Slovenia	0	0	1	1
Totals (16 entries)		10	10	10	30

== Medals summary ==
=== Recurve ===
Event	Gold	Silver	Bronze
Men's individual	Andrés Temiño; Spain	Marcus D'Almeida; Brazil	Kim Je-deok; South Korea
Women's individual	Kang Chae-young; South Korea	Zhu Jingyi; China	An San; South Korea
Men's team	South Korea; Kim Je-deok; Kim Woo-jin; Lee Woo-seok	United States; Trenton Cowles; Brady Ellison; Christian Stoddard	Japan; Tetsuya Aoshima; Yuki Kawata; Junya Nakanishi
Women's team	Chinese Taipei; Chiu Yi-ching; Hsu Hsin-tzu; Li Cai-xuan	Japan; Nanami Asakuno; Tomomi Sugimoto; Ruka Uehara	South Korea; An San; Kang Chae-young; Lim Si-hyeon
Mixed team	Spain; Elia Canales; Andrés Temiño	South Korea; An San; Kim Woo-jin	Japan; Nanami Asakuno; Yuki Kawata

=== Compound ===
Event	Gold	Silver	Bronze
Men's individual	Nicolas Girard; France	Mathias Fullerton; Denmark	Choi Yong-hee; South Korea
Women's individual	Andrea Becerra; Mexico	Sofía Paiz; El Salvador	Alejandra Usquiano; Colombia
Men's team	India; Prathamesh Fuge; Aman Saini; Rishabh Yadav	France; Jean-Philippe Boulch; François Dubois; Nicolas Girard	Slovenia; Aljaž Matija Brenk; Tim Jevšnik; Staš Modic
Women's team	Mexico; Andrea Becerra; Mariana Bernal; Adriana Castillo	United States; Olivia Dean; Alexis Ruiz; Sydney Sullenberger	Kazakhstan; Viktoriya Lyan; Roxana Yunussova; Adel Zhexenbinova
Mixed team	Netherlands; Sanne de Laat; Mike Schloesser	India; Jyothi Surekha Vennam; Rishabh Yadav	Mexico; Andrea Becerra; Sebastián García

== Participating nations ==
501 archers from 74 nations:

1. Australia (11)
2. Austria (4)
3. Azerbaijan (2)
4. Bangladesh (8)
5. Belgium (6)
6. Bermuda (2)
7. Brazil (12)
8. Bulgaria (4)
9. Canada (10)
10. Chad (1)
11. Chile (5)
12. China (8)
13. Colombia (5)
14. Croatia (4)
15. Cuba (1)
16. Czech Republic (8)
17. Denmark (10)
18. Ecuador (2)
19. Egypt (3)
20. El Salvador (7)
21. Spain (10)
22. Estonia (6)
23. France (12)
24. Faroe Islands (3)
25. Great Britain (12)
26. Georgia (6)
27. Germany (12)
28. Guatemala (3)
29. Hong Kong (12)
30. Hungary (3)
31. Individual Neutral Athletes (15)
32. Indonesia (12)
33. India (12)
34. Iraq (3)
35. Iceland (8)
36. Israel (9)
37. Italy (12)
38. Japan (8)
39. Kazakhstan (12)
40. Kyrgyzstan (4)
41. South Korea (12)
42. Saudi Arabia (5)
43. Latvia (3)
44. Libya (2)
45. Lithuania (4)
46. Macau (2)
47. Malaysia (5)
48. Moldova (4)
49. Mexico (12)
50. Mongolia (7)
51. Netherlands (10)
52. Peru (1)
53. Philippines (12)
54. Palestine (1)
55. Poland (12)
56. Portugal (1)
57. Puerto Rico (3)
58. Qatar (1)
59. Romania (1)
60. South Africa (3)
61. Singapore (6)
62. Slovenia (9)
63. Serbia (7)
64. Switzerland (3)
65. Slovakia (7)
66. Sweden (9)
67. Tajikistan (2)
68. Turkmenistan (3)
69. Chinese Taipei (12)
70. Turkey (12)
71. United Arab Emirates (5)
72. Ukraine (8)
73. United States (12)
74. Uzbekistan (6)
75. Vietnam (12)
