= Adel Zhexenbinova =

Kazakhstani archer (born 1999)

Personal information
- Born: 11 November 1999 (age 26)

Sport
- Sport: Archery
- Event: Compound
Medal record
Women's compound archery
Representing Kazakhstan
World Championships
Bronze medal – third place	2025 Gwangju	Team
Asian Championships
Bronze medal – third place	2019 Bangkok	Team

Adel Zhexenbinova (born 11 November 1999) is a Kazakhstani archer who competes in compound events. She won the bronze medal in the women's team compound event at the 2025 World Archery Championships.

== Career ==
In September 2025, Zhexenbinova competed at the 2025 World Archery Championships and won a bronze medal in the women's team event. This was Kazakhstan's first medal at the World Archery Championships since 1993.
