= Parneet Kaur =

Indian archer

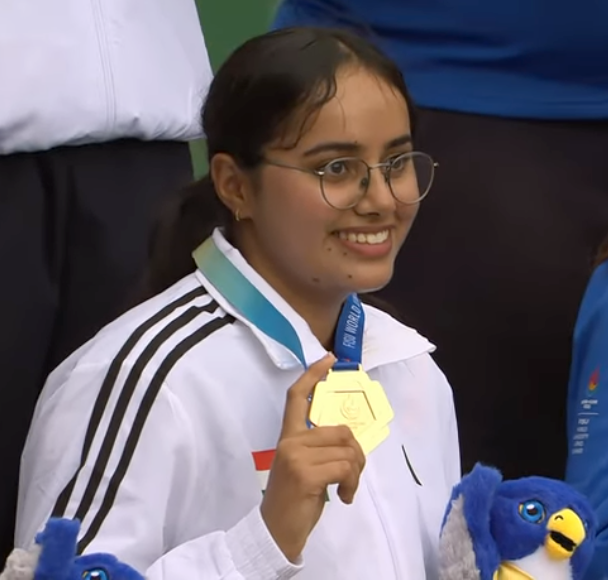
- At the 2025 Summer World University Games

Personal information
- Nationality: Indian
- Born: 2005 (age 20–21) Mandhali, Mansa, Punjab, India
- Education: Punjabi University

Sport
- Sport: Archery
- Event: Compound Archery
Medal record
Women's compound archery
Representing India
World Championships
| Gold medal – first place | 2023 Berlin | Team |
World Cup
| Gold medal – first place | 2023 Paris | Team |
| Gold medal – first place | 2024 Shanghai | Team |
| Gold medal – first place | 2024 Yecheon | Team |
| Gold medal – first place | 2024 Antalya | Team |
| Silver medal – second place | 2025 Madrid | Team |
| Bronze medal – third place | 2023 Medellín | Team |
Asian Games
| Gold medal – first place | 2022 Hangzhou | Team |
Asian Championships
| Gold medal – first place | 2023 Bangkok | Individual |
| Gold medal – first place | 2023 Bangkok | Team |
Universiade
| Gold medal – first place | 2025 Rhine-Ruhr | Mixed Team |
| Silver medal – second place | 2025 Rhine-Ruhr | Individual |
| Bronze medal – third place | 2025 Rhine-Ruhr | Team |

Parneet Kaur (born 2005) is an Indian compound archer. She is a gold medalist at the World Championships, Asian Games, Asian Championships and the Universiade. Kaur has also won multiple gold medals on the Archery World Cup circuit, establishing herself as one of India's leading compound archers.
