= Asian Archery Championships =

Archery championship

- Status: Active
- Genre: Asian Championship
- Date: Varying
- Frequency: Biannual
- Country: Varying
- Inaugurated: 1980
- Previous event: 2025 Asian Archery Championships
- Next event: 2027 Asian Archery Championships
- Organiser: World Archery Asia

Asian Archery Championships is the archery championship organized by the World Archery Asia. It has been held biannually, and since 2001 has included both the recurve and compound disciplines. The tournament began in 1980 and it was first hosted in India. Countries such as South Korea, China, Japan, and India compete, with many of the world's leading archers representing them.

== Editions ==
=== Recurve ===
	Year	Host	Men's individual	Women's individual	Men's team	Women's team	Mixed team
1	1980	Kolkata, India	(Indonesia) Donald Pandiangan				
2	1981	Singapore	(Philippines) Carlos Santos Jr.	(South Korea) Park Young-sook	South Korea	South Korea	
3	1983	Hong Kong	(South Korea) Kim Young-woon	(South Korea) Kim Jin-ho	South Korea	South Korea	
4	1985	Jakarta, Indonesia	(South Korea) Chun In-soo	(South Korea) Seo Hyang-soon	South Korea	South Korea	
5	1988	Kolkata, India	(South Korea) Ho Jin-soo	(South Korea) Kim Soo-nyung	South Korea	South Korea	
6	1989	Beijing, China			India		
7	1991	Manila, Philippines	(South Korea) Han Seung-hun	(South Korea) Lee Jang-mi	South Korea	South Korea	
8	1993	Jakarta, Indonesia	(South Korea) Kim Bo-ram	(South Korea) Kim Kyung-wook	South Korea	South Korea	
9	1996	Chonburi, Thailand	(China) Luo Hengyu	(South Korea) Kim Jung-rye	South Korea	South Korea	
10	1997	Langkawi, Malaysia	(South Korea) Oh Kyo-moon	(South Korea) Yoon Hye-young	Japan	South Korea	
11	1999	Beijing, China	(South Korea) Chung Jae-hun	(South Korea) Kang Hyun-ji	South Korea	South Korea	
12	2001	Hong Kong	(South Korea) Kim Won-sub	(China) Zhang Juanjuan	South Korea	Chinese Taipei	
13	2003	Yangon, Myanmar	(South Korea) Lee Dong-wook	(China) Lin Sang	South Korea	South Korea	
14	2005	New Delhi, India	(South Korea) Im Dong-hyun	(South Korea) Park Sung-hyun	South Korea	China	
15	2007	Xi'an, China	(Chinese Taipei) Wang Cheng-pang	(South Korea) Lee Sung-jin	India	South Korea	
16	2009	Denpasar, Indonesia	(Chinese Taipei) Kuo Cheng-wei	(South Korea) Joo Hyun-jung	South Korea	Japan	
17	2011	Tehran, Iran	(Malaysia) Khairul Anuar Mohamad	(Chinese Taipei) Yang Nien-hsiu	Malaysia	Japan	Kazakhstan
18	2013	Taipei, Taiwan	(Japan) Takaharu Furukawa	(Chinese Taipei) Lei Chien-ying	South Korea	South Korea	India
19	2015	Bangkok, Thailand	(South Korea) Lee Woo-seok	(South Korea) Chang Hye-jin	South Korea	South Korea	Chinese Taipei
20	2017	Dhaka, Bangladesh	(South Korea) Lee Seung-yun	(South Korea) Lee Eun-gyeong	South Korea	South Korea	South Korea
21	2019	Bangkok, Thailand	(South Korea) Lee Woo-seok	(South Korea) Kang Chae-young	South Korea	South Korea	South Korea
22	2021	Dhaka, Bangladesh	(South Korea) Lee Seung-yun	(South Korea) Lim Hae-jin	South Korea	South Korea	South Korea
23	2023	Bangkok, Thailand	(South Korea) Kim Woo-jin	(South Korea) Choi Mi-sun	South Korea	South Korea	South Korea
24	2025	Dhaka, Bangladesh	(India) Dhiraj Bommadevara	(India) Ankita Bhakat	India	South Korea	Chinese Taipei

=== Compound ===
	Year	Host	Men's individual	Women's individual	Men's team	Women's team	Mixed team
12	2001	Hong Kong	(Chinese Taipei) Wang Chih-hao	(Chinese Taipei) Huang I-ting	Chinese Taipei	Chinese Taipei	
13	2003	Yangon, Myanmar	(Chinese Taipei) Wang Chih-hao	(South Korea) Choi Mi-yeon	South Korea		
14	2005	New Delhi, India	(China) Cai Shuo	(India) Jhano Hansdah	India		
15	2007	Xi'an, China	(Philippines) Earl Yap	(South Korea) Kwon Oh-hyang	Iran	Philippines	
16	2009	Denpasar, Indonesia	(India) Isiah Rajendra Sanam	(South Korea) Seok Ji-hyun	India	South Korea	
17	2011	Tehran, Iran	(Iran) Reza Zamaninejad	(Iran) Maryam Ranjbar	Iran	South Korea	South Korea
18	2013	Taipei, Taiwan	(India) Abhishek Verma	(South Korea) Seok Ji-hyun	India	Chinese Taipei	India
19	2015	Bangkok, Thailand	(India) Rajat Chauhan	(India) Jyothi Surekha	India	South Korea	South Korea
20	2017	Dhaka, Bangladesh	(India) Abhishek Verma	(South Korea) Song Yun-soo	South Korea	India	South Korea
21	2019	Bangkok, Thailand	(South Korea) Choi Yong-hee	(South Korea) Seol Da-yeong	South Korea	South Korea	India
22	2021	Dhaka, Bangladesh	(South Korea) Kim Jong-ho	(India) Jyothi Surekha	South Korea	South Korea	South Korea
23	2023	Bangkok, Thailand	(Kazakhstan) Andre Tyutyun	(India) Parneet Kaur	South Korea	India	India
24	2025	Dhaka, Bangladesh	(South Korea) Lee Eun-ho	(India) Jyothi Surekha	Kazakhstan	India	India
