= World Archery Asia =

Sports governing body in Asia

- Abbreviation: WAA
- Formation: 1978; 48 years ago as Asian Archery Federation (AAF)
- Type: Sports organisation
- Headquarters: Dhaka, Bangladesh
- Region served: Asia
- Members: 41
- Secretary General: Jassem Shaheen Al-Sulaiti
- President: Kazi Rajib Uddin Ahmed Chapol
- Parent organization: World Archery
- Website: www.asianachery.com

The World Archery Asia (WAA) is the continental governing body of the sport of archery in Asia. It is affiliated to World Archery Federation (WAF). It was founded in 1978 at Bangkok Congress as the Asian Archery Federation (AAF). The name was changed into the current one during the 2013 Congress.

WAA HQ was first located in India, but was then moved to South Korea in 1986 by WAA's third president and the CEO of Hyundai Steel at the time, Chung Mong-koo. Chung, currently the Honorary Chairman of Hyundai Motor Group, served as WAA president for 11 years. For his contribution and service in the sport of archery, he was made an honorary vice president of World Archery in 2011.

In 2025, Kazi Rajib Uddin Ahmed Chapol, a Bangladeshi industrialist and prominent sports administrator, was elected as the 5th President of World Archery Asia and is currently serving a 2025–2029 term.

The current Secretary General of World Archery Asia is Jassem Shaheen Al-Sulaiti.
