= Dafne Quintero =

Mexican archer (born 2002)

Personal information
- Full name: Dafne Valeria Quintero García
- Born: 9 March 2002 (age 24)

Sport
- Country: Mexico
- Sport: Archery
- Event: Compound
Medal record
Women's compound archery
Representing Mexico
Event	1st	2nd	3rd
World Championships	0	1	0
World Youth Championships	2	1	1
World Cup Final	0	1	2
World Cup	2	4	5
Pan American Games	1	0	2
Pan American Championships	2	1	1
CAC Games	2	1	1
Junior Pan American Games	2	0	0
Total	11	9	12
World Championships
Silver medal – second place	2023 Berlin	Team
World Cup Final
Silver medal – second place	2026 Saltillo	Individual
Bronze medal – third place	2023 Hermosillo	Individual
Bronze medal – third place	2024 Tlaxcala	Individual
Pan American Games
Gold medal – first place	2023 Santiago	Individual
Bronze medal – third place	2023 Santiago	Team
Bronze medal – third place	2023 Santiago	Mixed team
Pan American Championships
Gold medal – first place	2022 Santiago	Team
Gold medal – first place	2026 Tlaxcala	Team
Silver medal – second place	2024 Medellín	Individual
Bronze medal – third place	2024 Medellín	Team
Central American and Caribbean Games
Gold medal – first place	2023 San Salvador	Individual
Gold medal – first place	2023 San Salvador	Team
Silver medal – second place	2026 Santo Domingo	Team
Bronze medal – third place	2023 San Salvador	Mixed team
World Youth Championships
Gold medal – first place	2019 Madrid	Cadet mixed team
Gold medal – first place	2021 Wrocław	Team
Silver medal – second place	2021 Wrocław	Mixed team
Bronze medal – third place	2019 Madrid	Cadet team
Junior Pan American Games
Gold medal – first place	2021 Cali-Valle	Individual
Gold medal – first place	2021 Cali-Valle	Mixed team

Dafne Valeria Quintero García (Note: In this Spanish name, the first or paternal surname is Quintero and the second or maternal family name is García.) (born 9 March 2002) is a Mexican archer competing in women's compound events. She won the gold medal in the women's individual compound event at the 2023 Pan American Games held in Santiago, Chile. She also won the gold medal in her event at the 2023 Central American and Caribbean Games held in El Salvador.

== Career ==
Quintero won two gold medals at the 2021 Junior Pan American Games held in Cali, Colombia. She won the gold medal in the women's individual compound event and also in the mixed team event. In 2022, Quintero, Mariana Bernal and Andrea Becerra won the gold medal in the women's team compound event at the Pan American Archery Championships held in Santiago, Chile.

She won two gold medals and one bronze medal at the 2023 Central American and Caribbean Games held in El Salvador. In August 2023, Quintero, Ana Hernández and Andrea Becerra won the silver in the women's team compound event at the World Archery Championships held in Berlin, Germany.

In November 2023, Quintero won the gold medal in the women's individual compound event at the Pan American Games held in Santiago, Chile. She also won the bronze medal in the women's team compound and mixed team compound events.

She finished in third place in the women's compound event at the 2024 The Vegas Shoot held in Las Vegas, United States.
