= 2022 Pan American Youth and Masters Archery Championships =

- Location: Halifax, Canada
- Dates: 31 May to 5 June 2022

The 2022 Pan American Youth and Masters Archery Championships took place in Halifax, Canada, from 31 May to 5 June 2022.

== Medal summary ==
=== Recurve ===
Event	Gold	Silver	Bronze
Under 21 Men's individual	Carlos Vaca; Mexico	Stefan Savin; United States	Andrés Gallardo; Chile
Under 21 Women's individual	Ana Luiza Caetano; Brazil	Paola Saucedo; Mexico	Grecia Adriana Gonzalez Talamantes; Mexico
Under 18 Men's individual	Francisco Padilla; Mexico	Daniel Jiménez; Colombia	Ewan An; United States
Under 18 Women's individual	Diana Gutierrez; Mexico	Isabelle Estevez; Brazil	Yatana Mora; Mexico
Under 50+ Men's individual	Mark Williams; United States	Stephen Vickers; United States	Daniel Cannelli; Argentina
Under 50+ Women's individual	Janis Grellner; United States	Susan Bock; United States	Tatyana Muntyan; U.S. Virgin Islands
Under 21 Men's team	Mexico; Miguel Figueroa; Saul Pena Gaxiola; Carlos Vaca	Canada; Jules Chouinard; Benjamen Lee; Dawson Molitor	Argentina; Lucas Jano Espinosa; Santiago Hidalgo; Agustin Nogueiras
Under 21 Women's team	Colombia; Mariana Lozada; Mónica Restrepo; Gabriela Ruiz	Mexico; Grecia Adriana Gonzalez Talamantes; Paola Saucedo; Sarah Silva	United States; Alyssa Artz; Eunice Haeri Choi; Ashley Kim
Under 21 Mixed team	Mexico; Grecia Adriana Gonzalez Talamantes; Carlos Vaca	Brazil; Ana Luiza Caetano; Matheus Quintanilhia Pacheco Gomes	United States; Ashley Kim; Landon Richardson
Under 18 Mixed team	Mexico; Yatana Mora; Francisco Padilla	United States; Akshara Vijay; Ewan An	Brazil; Isabelle Estevez; Emanuel Luiz Gravano Paulo De Azevedo
Under 50+ Mixed team	United States; Susan Bock; Mark Williams	Argentina; Claudia Monica De Giusti; Daniel Cannelli	United States Virgin Islands; Tatyana Muntyan; Bruce Arnold

=== Compound ===
Event	Gold	Silver	Bronze
Under 21 Men's individual	Rodrigo De Alba; Mexico	Pablo Gómez; Colombia	Isaac Sullivan; United States
Under 21 Women's individual	Isabella Otter; United States	Paola Corado; El Salvador	Chyler Sanders; Canada
Under 18 Men's individual	Jose Cuellar; Mexico	William Fowler; United States	Julián Gómez; Colombia
Under 18 Women's individual	Ximena Estrada; Mexico	Savannah O'Donohue; United States	Adriana Castillo; Mexico
Under 50+ Men's individual	Chuck Cooley; United States	Christopher Deston; United States	Horacio Rubén Fannelli; Argentina
Under 50+ Women's individual	Dawn Groszko; Canada	Tricia Oshiro; Canada	Alanna Dunaway; United States
Under 21 Mixed team	United States; Isabella Otter; Tyler Heritage	El Salvador; Paola Corado; Paul Morataya	Canada; Chyler Sanders; Dustin Watson
Under 18 Mixed team	United States; LeeAna Burley; William Fowler	Mexico; Adriana Castillo; Jose Cuellar	Canada; Bailey Mathers; Emmett Kapaniuk

=== Barebow ===
Event	Gold	Silver	Bronze
Under 21 Women's individual	Anastacia Godman; United States	Raeleigh Mckellar; United States	Lauren Heinzelman; United States
Under 18 Men's individual	Max Rossiter; United States	Nicholas Heinzelman; United States	Luca Tatro; United States
Under 18 Women's individual	Abigail Sparpaglione; United States	Erin Heyob; United States	Maggie Brensinger; United States
Under 50+ Men's individual	Daniel Weiss; United States	Rick Stonebraker; United States	Lloyd Polack; Canada
Under 50+ Women's individual	Ruth Delzell; United States	Angela Foley; Canada	Darlene Kossler; United States

== Medal table ==
* Host nation (Canada)

Rank	Nation	Gold	Silver	Bronze	Total
1	United States	12	11	9	32
2	Mexico	9	3	3	15
3	Canada*	1	3	4	8
4	Brazil	1	2	1	4
4	Colombia	1	2	1	4
6	El Salvador	0	2	0	2
7	Argentina	0	1	3	4
8	U.S. Virgin Islands	0	0	2	2
9	Chile	0	0	1	1
Totals (9 entries)		24	24	24	72
