= Archery at the 2023 Pan American Games – Men's individual compound =

Men's individual compound at the 2023 Pan American Games
- Venue: Archery Center
- Dates: November 1 – November 4
- Competitors: 16 from 10 nations

Medalists
Gold medal	Jean Pizarro	Puerto Rico
Silver medal	Sawyer Sullivan	United States
Bronze medal	Jagdeep Singh	Colombia

The men's individual compound competition of the archery events at the 2023 Pan American Games was held from November 1 to 4 at the Archery Center in Santiago, Chile.

== Schedule ==
Date	Time	Round
November 1, 2023	14:00	Ranking Round
November 2, 2023	09:55	Round of 16
November 3, 2023	9:56	Quarterfinals
November 4, 2023	15:06	Semifinals
November 4, 2023	16:02	Final

== Records ==
Prior to this competition, the existing world and Pan American Games records were as follows:

- 72 arrow ranking round

World record	Braden Gellenthien (USA)	718	Decatur, United States	July 13, 2016
Pan American Games record	Braden Gellenthien (USA)	712	Lima, Peru	August 7, 2019

- 15 arrows

World record	Reo Wilde (USA)	150	Shanghai, China	May 7, 2015
Pan American Games record	Braden Gellenthien (USA)	149	Lima, Peru	August 9, 2019

== Results ==
=== Ranking round ===
The results were as follows:

Rank	Archer	Nation	Score	Note
1	Kris Schaff	United States	715	PR
2	Jagdeep Singh	Colombia	709	
3	Luccas Abreu	Brazil	705	
4	Roberto Hernández	El Salvador	705	
5	Julio Barillas	Independent Athletes Team	704	
6	Sawyer Sullivan	United States	703	
7	Sebastián Arenas	Colombia	703	
8	Jean Pizarro	Puerto Rico	701	
9	Douglas Nolasco	El Salvador	701	
10	Andrew Fagan	Canada	700	
11	Sebastian García	Mexico	699	
12	Juan del Rio	Mexico	699	
13	Ivan Nikolajuk	Argentina	698	
14	Alejandro Martín	Chile	696	
15	Pedro Salazar	Independent Athletes Team	691	
16	Tristan Spicer-Moran	Canada	689	

=== Competition rounds ===
The results during the elimination rounds and final rounds were as follows:

==== Draw ====
Round of 16
1	K Schaff (USA)	149
16	T Spicer-Moran (CAN)	148
9	D Nolasco (ESA)	144
8	J Pizarro (PUR)	147
5	J Barrilas (EAI)	144
12	Juan del Rio (MEX)	146
13	I Nikolajuk (ARG)	145
4	R Hernández (ESA)	147
3	L Abreu (BRA)	147-T9
14	A Martin (CHI)	147-T10
11	S García (MEX)	145
6	S Sullivan (USA)	147
7	S Arenas (COL)	145
10	A Fagan (CAN)	143
15	P Salazar (EAI)	144
2	J Singh (COL)	149

Quarterfinals
1	K Schaff (USA)	146
8	J Pizarro (PUR)	147
12	Juan del Rio (MEX)	144
4	R Hernández (ESA)	148
14	A Martin (CHI)	143
6	S Sullivan (USA)	147
7	S Arenas (COL)	145
2	J Singh (COL)	147

Semifinais
8	J Pizarro (PUR)	144
4	R Hernández (ESA)	141
6	S Sullivan (USA)	144-T10+
2	J Singh (COL)	144-T10

Final
8	J Pizarro (PUR)	145
6	S Sullivan (USA)	144
Bronze match
4	R Hernández (ESA)	144
2	J Singh (COL)	145
