= Ángela Ruiz =

Mexican archer (born 2006)

Personal information
- Full name: Ángela Ruiz Rosales
- Born: 29 July 2006 (age 20) Saltillo, Coahuila, Mexico

Sport
- Country: Mexico
- Sport: Archery
- Event: Recurve
Medal record
Women's recurve archery
Representing Mexico
Olympic Games
Bronze medal – third place	2024 Paris	Team
World Championships
Bronze medal – third place	2023 Berlin	Team
World Cup
Gold medal – first place	2023 Antalya	Team
Silver medal – second place	2023 Medellín	Individual
Silver medal – second place	2026 Antalya	Team
Bronze medal – third place	2026 Puebla	Team
Pan American Championships
Silver medal – second place	2024 Medellín	Team
Silver medal – second place	2026 Tlaxcala	Team
Bronze medal – third place	2026 Tlaxcala	Individual
Pan American Games
Silver medal – second place	2023 Santiago	Team
Central American and Caribbean Games
Gold medal – first place	2023 San Salvador	Team
Gold medal – first place	2026 Santo Domingo	Team
Bronze medal – third place	2023 San Salvador	Individual
World Youth Championships
Silver medal – second place	2025 Winnipeg	Individual
Junior Pan American Games
Gold medal – first place	2025 Asunción	Team

Ángela Ruiz Rosales (born 29 July 2006) is a Mexican archer competing in women's recurve events. She competed at the 2024 Summer Olympics.

== Early life ==
She started archery at the age of nine years-old in her home city of Saltillo.

== Career ==
She made her under-18 debut at the 2021 World Archery Youth Championships in Poland.

She was part of the Mexican team that won a first recurve women's team title in a stage of the Hyundai Archery World Cup in Antalya in 2023. Ruiz subsequently finished runner-up individually at the next leg of the world tour in Medellín.

She won a gold medal in the teams event at the Central American and Caribbean Games in San Salvador in 2023. She also won a silver medal in the women's recurve team at the 2023 Pan American Games.

She was selected for the team and individual events at the 2024 Summer Olympics. At the age of 17 years-old at the start of the games she was the youngest member of the Mexican delegation to the Games.
