= Archery at the 2023 Pan American Games – Women's team compound =

Women's team compound at the 2023 Pan American Games
- Venue: Archery Center
- Dates: November 1 – November 4
- Competitors: 10 from 5 nations

Medalists
Gold medal	Olivia Dean; Alexis Ruiz	United States
Silver medal	Sara López; Alejandra Usquiano	Colombia
Bronze medal	Andrea Becerra; Dafne Quintero	Mexico

The women's team compound competition of the archery events at the 2023 Pan American Games was held from November 1 to 4 at the Archery Center in Santiago, Chile.

== Schedule ==
Date	Time	Round
November 1, 2023	14:00	Ranking Round
November 1, 2023	16:20	Quarterfinals
November 1, 2023	16:45	Semifinals
November 4, 2023	9:00	Final

== Results ==
=== Ranking round ===
The results were as follows:

Rank	Archer	Nation	Score
1	Sara López; Alejandra Usquiano	Colombia	1411
2	Olivia Dean; Alexis Ruiz	United States	1404
3	Andrea Becerra; Dafne Quintero	Mexico	1393
4	Eiry Nisi; Larissa Oliveira	Brazil	1375
5	Paola Corado; Sofia Paiz	El Salvador	1372

=== Competition rounds ===
The results during the elimination rounds and final rounds were as follows:

==== Draw ====
Round of 16
5	El Salvador	155
4	Brazil	151

Quarterfinals
1	Colombia	155
5	El Salvador	151
3	Mexico	151
2	United States	156

Semifinais
1	Colombia	153
2	United States	160
Final
5	El Salvador	154
3	Mexico	158
