= 2025 World Archery Championships – Mixed team recurve =

Mixed team recurve at the 2025 World Archery Championships
- Venue: Gwangju International Archery Center
- Location: Gwangju, South Korea
- Dates: 9–10 September
- Competitors: 86 from 43 nations

Medalists
gold medal	Elia Canales; Andrés Temiño	Spain
silver medal	An San; Kim Woo-jin	South Korea
bronze medal	Nanami Asakuno; Yuki Kawata	Japan

The mixed's team recurve competition at the 2025 World Archery Championships, which will take place from 9 to 10 September 2025 in Gwangju, South Korea.

== Schedule ==
All times are in Korea Standard Time (UTC+09:00).

Date	Time	Round
Monday, 8 September		Official practice
Tuesday, 9 September	09:00; 16:45; 17:10; 17:35; 18:00	Qualification round First Round; Second round Quarterfinals; Semifinals
Wednesday, 10 September	14:05; 14:24	Bronze-medal match Gold-medal match

== Qualification round ==
Results after 144 arrows. The highest scoring (non-nominative) of each gender is taken from a nation entering at least a man and woman. The top 24 teams qualified to Elimination round.

High green denotes at least one round bye.
Light green denotes entering from first round.

Rank	Nation	Name	Score
1	South Korea	An San; Kim Woo-jin	1393 WR
2	China	Zhu Jingyi; Kao Wenchao	1375
3	Spain	Elia Canales; Andrés Temiño	1364
4	Ukraine	Anastasia Pavlova; Oleksii Hunbin	1351
5	Chinese Taipei	Chiu Yi-ching; Tang Chih-chun	1351
6	Mexico	Alejandra Valencia; Matías Grande	1351
7	India	Deepika Kumari; Neeraj Chauhan	1347
8	United States	Jennifer Mucino-Fernandez; Christian Stoddard	1344
9	Italy	Chiara Rebagliati; Matteo Borsani	1342
10	Japan	Nanami Asakuno; Yuki Kawata	1339
11	France	Victoria Sebastian; Thomas Chirault	1338
12	Germany	Katharina Bauer; Moritz Wieser	1337
13	Turkey	Elif Berra Gökkır; Berkim Tümer	1335
14	Netherlands	Quinty Roeffen; Willem Bakker	1334
15	Indonesia	Diananda Choirunisa; Riau Ega Agata Salsabilla	1331
16	Australia	Alexandra Feeney; Ryan Tyack	1326
17	Czech Republic	Marie Horáčková; Richard Krejčí	1316
18	Vietnam	Lộc Thị Đào; Lê Quốc Phong	1316
19	Denmark	Kirstine Danstrup Andersen; Christian Christensen	1315
20	Slovenia	Žana Pintarič; Den Habjan Malavašič	1314
21	United Arab Emirates	Samiya Odinaeva; Sib Sankar Maity	1313
22	Brazil	Ane Marcelle dos Santos; Marcus D'Almeida	1312
23	Kazakhstan	Alexandra Zemlyanova; Ilfat Abdullin	1312
24	Great Britain	Megan Costall; Patrick Huston	1310
25	Bangladesh	Sima Aktar Shimu; Ram Krishna Saha	1310
26	Canada	Virginie Chénier; Eric Peters	1307
27	Uzbekistan	Ziyodakhon Abdusattorova; Amirkhon Sadikov	1304
28	Israel	Mikaella Moshe; Roy Dror	1304
29	Mongolia	Bishindeegiin Urantungalag; Jantsangiin Gantögs	1304
30	Austria	Elisabeth Straka; Lukas Kurz	1304
31	Hong Kong	Poon Wei Tsing Natalie; Kwok Yin Chai	1300
32	Georgia	Salome Kharshiladze; Aleksandre Machavariani	1291
33	Moldova	Alexandra Mîrca; Dan Olaru	1290
34	Poland	Natalia Leśniak; Oskar Kasprowski	1281
35	Slovakia	Denisa Baránková; Ondrej Franců	1277
36	Sweden	Erika Jangnäs; Kaj Sjöberg	1262
37	Azerbaijan	Fatima Huseynli; Mahammadali Aliyev	1256
38	Philippines	Giuliana Vernice Garcia; Jason Emmanuel Feliciano	1256
39	Kyrgyzstan	Asel Sharbekova; Emirbek Mashev	1251
40	Bulgaria	Dobromira Danailova; Ivan Banchev	1244
41	Egypt	Jana Ali; Youssof Tolba	1223
42	Serbia	Anja Brkić; Mihajlo Stefanović	1217
43	Libya	Rasha Abouzamazem; Mohamed Khalf	1030

== Elimination round ==
=== Section 1 ===
1/12 finals
17	Czech Republic	6	38	37	40
16	Australia	0	36	36	37
9	Italy	5	37	33	38	38	19
24	Great Britain	4	40	38	37	36	18
21	United Arab Emirates	2	37	35	36	36
12	Germany	6	36	38	38	38
13	Turkey	3	38	37	36	37
20	Slovenia	5	38	37	37	37

1/8 finals
1	South Korea	5	39	38	36	37
17	Czech Republic	3	39	36	40	35
9	Italy	1	37	38	36
8	United States	5	37	39	37
5	Chinese Taipei	0	35	36	37
12	Germany	6	39	37	39
20	Slovenia	1	35	36	35
4	Ukraine	5	35	37	39

Quarterfinals
1	South Korea	6	39	38	38
8	United States	0	35	37	36
12	Germany	6	38	38	39
4	Ukraine	0	37	37	34

Semifinals
1	South Korea	5	38	37	38	40
12	Germany	3	38	37	38	36

=== Section 2 ===
1/12 finals
19	Denmark	4	36	38	38	37	17
14	Netherlands	5	36	35	38	38	19
11	France	5	35	40	37
22	Brazil	1	35	38	32
23	Kazakhstan	2	37	36	39	36
10	Japan	6	39	39	37	39
15	Indonesia	3	39	37	36	36
18	Vietnam	5	37	37	37	39

1/8 finals
3	Spain	6	37	38	38
14	Netherlands	0	36	35	37
11	France	3	34	36	37	39
6	Mexico	5	34	36	40	39
7	India	4	36	36	37	38	18
10	Japan	5	37	36	37	37	19
18	Vietnam	5	38	39	38	38	19
2	China	4	38	40	38	36	17

Quarterfinals
3	Spain	5	38	37	37	38
6	Mexico	3	37	39	37	37
10	Japan	5	38	38	39
18	Vietnam	1	38	35	36

Semifinals
3	Spain	5	37	38	39
10	Japan	1	36	38	30

== Final round ==
Semifinals
1	South Korea	5	38	37	38	40
12	Germany	3	38	37	38	36
3	Spain	5	37	38	39
10	Japan	1	36	38	30

Finals
1	South Korea	2	35	37	38	34
3	Spain	6	36	38	36	37
Third place
12	Germany	3	35	38	34	35
10	Japan	5	37	37	37	35
