= 2026 Pan American Youth and Masters Archery Championships =

- Location: Medellín, Colombia
- Dates: 24 to 28 May 2026

The 2026 Pan American Youth and Masters Archery Championships took place in Medellín, Colombia, from 24 to 28 May 2026.

== Medal summary ==
=== Recurve ===
Event	Gold	Silver	Bronze
Under 21 Men's individual	Osvaldo Ramirez; Mexico	Francisco Javier Marquez Saenz; Mexico	Simón Martínez; Colombia
Under 21 Women's individual	Janna Hawash; Canada	Victoria Virgen Martinez; Mexico	Karime Montoya Alfaro; Mexico
Under 18 Men's individual	Axel Rangel Morales; Mexico	Juan José Molina; Colombia	Cristóbal Giraldo; Colombia
Under 18 Women's individual	Madelyn Yi; United States	Megan Ortiz Paredes; Mexico	Yeshaswini Tati; United States
Under 15 Men's individual	Alejandro Gil; Colombia	Cesar Andres Niembro Gonzalez; Mexico	Victor Eli Ortega Orozco; Mexico
Under 15 Women's individual	Paige Lee; United States	Iris Noemi Rodriguez Jaime; Mexico	Eugenia Flores Galindo; Mexico
Under 50+ Men's individual	Mark Williams; United States	Victor Gabriel Bibe; Argentina	Mark Hainline; United States
Under 50+ Women's individual	Jamie Mccarrison; United States	Tatyana Muntyan; U.S. Virgin Islands	Janis Grellner; United States
Under 21 Men's team	Mexico; Francisco Javier Marquez Saenz; Leonardo Pacheco Nava; Osvaldo Ramirez	Colombia; Andrés Hernández; Simón Martínez; Alejandro Vargas	Guatemala; Ian Pablo Allen; Christian Esthephen Garcia; Sebastián Osorio
Under 21 Women's team	Mexico; Isis Yaretzi Gutierrez Munoz; Karime Montoya Alfaro; Victoria Virgen Martinez	Colombia; Angie Bastidas; María Pinillo; Katherin Urrego	United States; Elizabeth Ahn; Andrea Ciotinga; Eliana Son
Under 18 Men's team	United States; Jack Chen; Nicholas Kim; Liam Lee	Colombia; Santiago Aguilar; Cristóbal Giraldo; Juan José Molina	Mexico; José Felipe Cerecedo Perez; Axel Rangel Morales; Yeshua Alejandro Villanueva Gutierrez
Under 18 Women's team	Colombia; Juana Cardona; Salome Duque; Sofía Gómez	United States; Amy Lee; Yeshaswini Tati; Madelyn Yi	Mexico; Maya Casas Lara; Ivana Cortez Becerra; Megan Ortiz Paredes
Under 21 Mixed team	Guatemala; Sara Sofía Garcia Palacios; Christian Esthephen Garcia	United States; Eliana Son; Joseph Diesta	Mexico; Victoria Virgen Martinez; Osvaldo Ramirez
Under 18 Mixed team	Mexico; Maya Casas Lara; Axel Rangel Morales	Colombia; Salome Duque; Cristóbal Giraldo	United States; Qianye Lyu; Jack Chen
Under 15 Mixed team	Colombia; Ana Lucía Guarin; Alejandro Gil	United States; Paige Lee; Anirduhkalyan Pinjala	Mexico; Eugenia Flores Galindo; Victor Eli Ortega Orozco
Under 50+ Men's team	United States; Ali Gungoraydinoglu; Mark Hainline; Mark Williams	Argentina; Victor Gabriel Bibe; Daniel Cannelli; Claudio Roberto Marconi	Puerto Rico; Marcelino Figueroa Rosario; Ismael Flores; Ramon Luis Gonzalez Ramos
Under 50+ Mixed team	United States; Janis Grellner; Mark Williams	Colombia; Maria Victoria Echavarria; Gildardo Anselmo Fuentes	(United States Virgin Islands) U.S. Virgin Islands; Tatyana Muntyan; Bruce Arnold

=== Compound ===
Event	Gold	Silver	Bronze
Under 21 Men's individual	Juan Pablo Silva Pinon; Mexico	Luis Esteban Rios Rodriguez; Mexico	Jaider Mosquera; Colombia
Under 21 Women's individual	Danica Fránces Barrera Arana; Guatemala	Zoie Thompson; United States	Michelle Cardona; Colombia
Under 18 Men's individual	Jerónimo Agudelo; Colombia	Harkunwar Singh Teja; Canada	Easton Bishop; United States
Under 18 Women's individual	Bryhanna Stephania Villatoro Zecena; Guatemala	Larissa Gimmler; Mexico	Mariana Saravia Berthet; Guatemala
Under 15 Men's individual	Arturo Barrera Rodriguez; Mexico	Laganjot Singh Sandhu; Canada	Yhorman Morales Fuentes; Costa Rica
Under 15 Women's individual	Anna Isabella Esparza Pelcastre; Mexico	Camila Dominguez Echeverria; Mexico	Sofia Soler; Mexico
Under 50+ Men's individual	Emilio Josue Sulvaran Macias; Mexico	Jaime Valentin; Puerto Rico	Harold Cuadros; Colombia
Under 50+ Women's individual	Maria Latorre; Puerto Rico	Dawn Groszko; Canada	Eliana Siado; Colombia
Under 21 Men's team	Colombia; Julián Gómez; Jaider Mosquera; Juan Restrepo	Mexico; Carlos Daniel Lira Garcia; Luis Esteban Rios Rodriguez; Juan Pablo Silva Pinon	Brazil; Rafael Magalhaes; Henrique Mezzacapa; João Nunes
Under 21 Women's team	Colombia; Michelle Cardona; Karen Giraldo; María José Quintero	Guatemala; Danica Fránces Barrera Arana; Claudia María De La Cruz Cruz; Paulina Abigail Ramirez Castillo	United States; Leeana Burley; Elyse Matus; Zoie Thompson
Under 18 Women's team	Guatemala; Sara Sophia Portillo Sandoval; Mariana Saravia Berthet; Bryhanna Stephania Villatoro Zecena	Colombia; Karina Arango; Susana Monsalve; María José Ortíz	Mexico; Larissa Gimmler; Renata Victoria Hernandez Gutierrez; Melissa Robles Retano
Under 21 Mixed team	Colombia; Michelle Cardona; Julián Gómez	Mexico; Karla Roxana Arellano Hernandez; Luis Esteban Rios Rodriguez	Ecuador; Blanca Maritza Rodrigo Bueno; Matias Joaquin Avila Barrera
Under 18 Mixed team	Canada; Acadia Flockton; Bennett Nelson	United States; Gracelyn Sinclair; Maverick Lewis	Mexico; Larissa Gimmler; Ian Patricio Vite Flores
Under 15 Mixed team	Canada; Jiayi Yuan; Cole Cahill	Mexico; Sofia Soler; Oscar Enrique Gamboa Marrufo	Colombia; María Echeverry; Emiliano Bedoya
Under 50+ Mixed team	Puerto Rico; Maria Latorre; Jaime Valentin	Colombia; Claudia Ordóñez; Harold Cuadros	Argentina; Nora Cristina Japaze; Douglas Sarmiento Oberti

=== Barebow ===
Event	Gold	Silver	Bronze
Under 21 Men's individual	Keegan Benton; United States	Nicolas Powell; United States	Not awarded
Under 18 Men's + Women's individual	Sykes Lamensdorf; United States	Pranav Sanjay; United States	Ayana Butt; United States
Under 15 Men's + Women's individual	Rondon Wilkinson; Trinidad and Tobago	Nathan Lee; United States	Noah Graham; United States
Under 50+ Men's individual	Jim O'Shea; United States	Rick Stonebraker; United States	Johannes Gildenhuys; United States
Under 50+ Women's individual	Melissa Mcavoy; United States	Angela Orcutt; Canada	Deb Dimatteo; United States

== Medal table ==
* Host nation (Colombia)

Rank	Nation	Gold	Silver	Bronze	Total
1	United States	11	9	11	31
2	Mexico	9	11	10	30
3	Colombia*	7	8	7	22
4	Guatemala	4	1	2	7
5	Canada	3	4	0	7
6	Puerto Rico	2	1	1	4
7	Trinidad and Tobago	1	0	0	1
8	Argentina	0	2	1	3
9	U.S. Virgin Islands	0	1	1	2
10	Brazil	0	0	1	1
10	Costa Rica	0	0	1	1
10	Ecuador	0	0	1	1
Totals (12 entries)		37	37	36	110
