= Sawyer Sullivan =

American archer (born 2004)

Personal information
- Born: April 5, 2004 (age 22)

Sport
- Sport: Archery
- Event: Compound
Medal record
Men's compound archery
Representing the United States
World Championships
Gold medal – first place	2023 Berlin	Mixed team
Pan American Championships
Gold medal – first place	2022 Santiago	Team
Gold medal – first place	2024 Medellín	Mixed team
Bronze medal – third place	2022 Santiago	Individual
Pan American Games
Silver medal – second place	2023 Santiago	Individual
Silver medal – second place	2023 Santiago	Team
World Youth Championships
Gold medal – first place	2019 Madrid	Team
Silver medal – second place	2021 Wroclaw	Individual
Silver medal – second place	2021 Wroclaw	Team
Silver medal – second place	2021 Wroclaw	Mixed team

Sawyer Sullivan (born April 5, 2004) is an American archer who competes in compound events. He is a gold medalist at the World and Pan American Championships.

== Career ==
Sullivan made his international debut for the United States at the World Archery Youth Championships in 2019 and won a gold medal in the men's team event. He again competed at the World Archery Youth Championships in 2021, and won silver medals in the individual, men's team and mixed team events. In November 2022, he competed at the 2022 Pan American Archery Championships and won a gold medal in the men's team event, and a bronze medal in the individual event.

In August 2023, he competed at the 2023 World Archery Championships and won a gold medal in the mixed team event, along with Alexis Ruiz. In November 2023, he competed at the 2023 Pan American Games and won silver medals in the individual and men's team events.

In April 2024, he competed at the 2024 Pan American Archery Championships and won a gold medal in the mixed team event, along with Ruiz. In August 2025, he competed at the 2025 World Games in the individual event.
