= Alejandra Usquiano =

Colombian archer (born 1993)

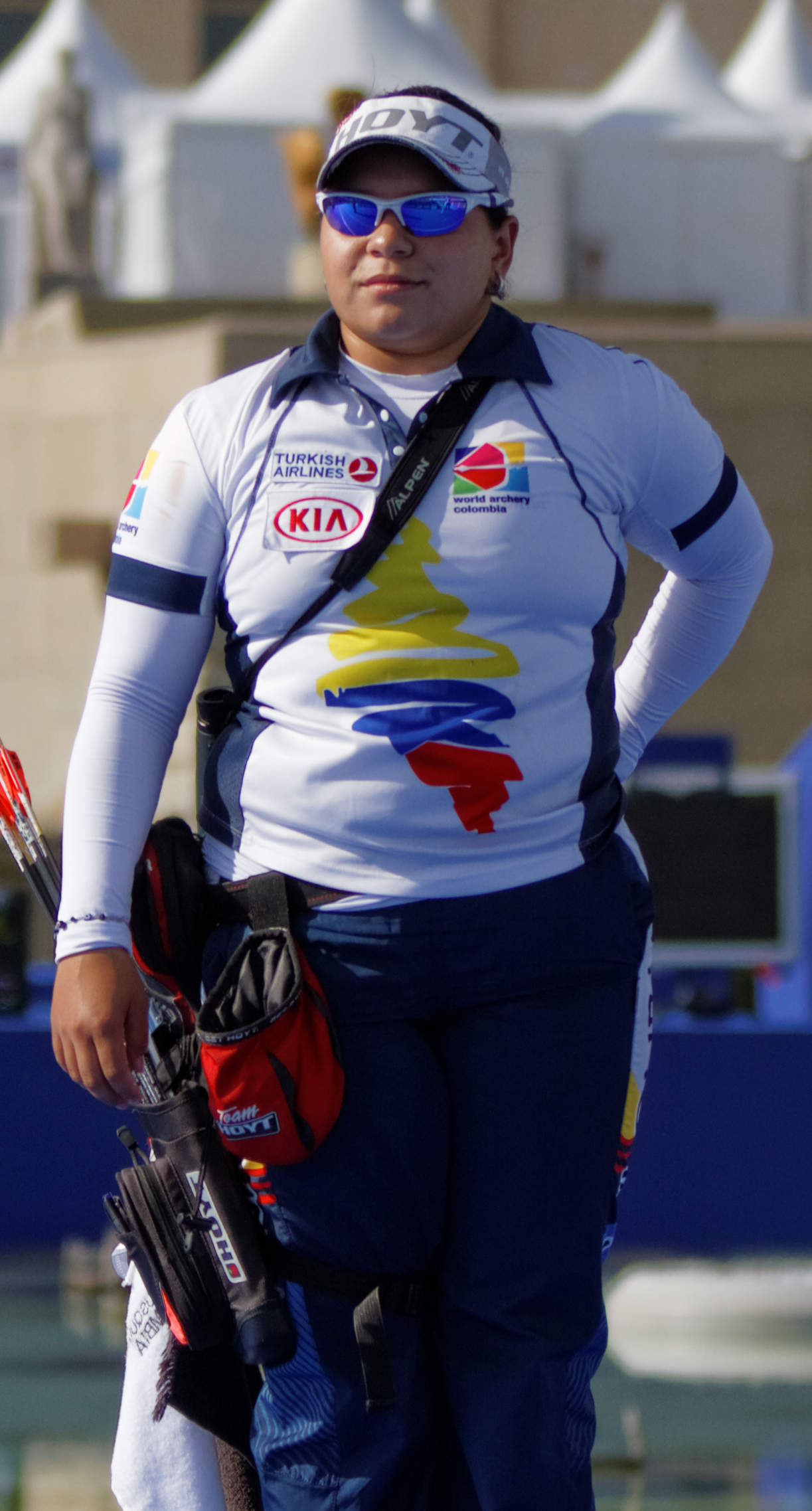
- Usquiano in 2013

Personal information
- Full name: Alejandra Milena Usquiano Gómez
- Born: 12 May 1993 (age 33) Medellín, Colombia

Sport
- Country: Colombia
- Sport: Archery
- Event: Compound
Medal record
Representing Colombia
Women's compound archery
Event	1st	2nd	3rd
World Championships	3	0	1
World Cup Final	1	1	1
World Cup	10	9	4
Indoor World Series	2	0	0
Pan American Games	0	1	1
Pan American Championships	3	3	4
CAC Games	0	3	1
South American Games	3	1	1
Bolivarian Games	5	4	1
Total	27	22	14
World Championships
Gold medal – first place	2013 Belek	Team
Gold medal – first place	2017 Mexico City	Team
Gold medal – first place	2021 Yankton	Team
Bronze medal – third place	2025 Gwangju	Individual
World Cup Final
Gold medal – first place	2013 Paris	Individual
Silver medal – second place	2016 Odense	Mixed team
Bronze medal – third place	2022 Tlaxcala	Individual
Pan American Games
Silver medal – second place	2023 Santiago	Team
Bronze medal – third place	2023 Santiago	Individual
Pan American Championships
Gold medal – first place	2014 Rosario	Individual
Gold medal – first place	2014 Rosario	Team
Gold medal – first place	2021 Monterrey	Team
Silver medal – second place	2018 Medellín	Team
Silver medal – second place	2022 Santiago	Team
Silver medal – second place	2026 Tlaxcala	Team
Bronze medal – third place	2010 Guadalajara	Team
Bronze medal – third place	2012 San Salvador	Individual
Bronze medal – third place	2021 Monterrey	Individual
Bronze medal – third place	2026 Tlaxcala	Individual
Central American and Caribbean Games
Silver medal – second place	2014 Veracruz	Team
Silver medal – second place	2018 Barranquilla	Team
Silver medal – second place	2023 San Salvador	Team
Bronze medal – third place	2026 Santo Domingo	Team
South American Games
Gold medal – first place	2018 Cochabamba	Team
Gold medal – first place	2022 Asunción	Team
Gold medal – first place	2026 Santa Fe	Team
Silver medal – second place	2010 Medellín	Team
Bronze medal – third place	2022 Asunción	Individual
Bolivarian Games
Gold medal – first place	2013 Trujillo	Team
Gold medal – first place	2017 Santa Marta	Team
Gold medal – first place	2022 Valledupar	Team
Gold medal – first place	2025 Lima-Ayacucho	Team
Gold medal – first place	2025 Lima-Ayacucho	Mixed team
Silver medal – second place	2013 Trujillo	Individual
Silver medal – second place	2017 Santa Marta	Individual
Silver medal – second place	2017 Santa Marta	Individual 50 m
Silver medal – second place	2025 Lima-Ayacucho	Individual
Bronze medal – third place	2013 Trujillo	Individual 50 m

Alejandra Milena Usquiano Gómez (Note: In this Spanish name, the first or paternal surname is Usquiano and the second or maternal family name is Gómez.) (born 12 May 1993) is a Colombian athlete who competes in compound archery. She won a gold medal at the 2013 Archery World Cup Final, and achieved her highest world ranking of 6 in 2013.

She won the silver medal in the women's compound event at the Antalya, Turkey event in the 2022 Archery World Cup.
