= Matías Grande =

Mexican archer (born 2004)

Personal information
- Full name: Matías Damián Grande Kalionchiz
- Born: 26 April 2004 (age 22) Guanajuato, Mexico

Sport
- Sport: Archery
- Event: Recurve
Medal record
Men's recurve archery
Representing Mexico
Pan American Championships
Gold medal – first place	2022 Santiago	Team
Gold medal – first place	2022 Santiago	Mixed team
Gold medal – first place	2024 Medellín	Individual
Gold medal – first place	2026 Tlaxcala	Mixed team
Silver medal – second place	2024 Medellín	Mixed team
Bronze medal – third place	2022 Santiago	Individual
Bronze medal – third place	2026 Tlaxcala	Individual
Pan American Games
Silver medal – second place	2023 Santiago	Individual
Silver medal – second place	2023 Santiago	Team
Bronze medal – third place	2023 Santiago	Mixed team
Central American and Caribbean Games
Gold medal – first place	2023 San Salvador	Team
Gold medal – first place	2023 San Salvador	Mixed team
Gold medal – first place	2026 Santo Domingo	Individual
Gold medal – first place	2026 Santo Domingo	Team
Gold medal – first place	2026 Santo Domingo	Mixed team

Matías Damián Grande Kalionchiz (born 26 April 2004) is a Mexican archer competing in men's recurve events. He is a four-time Pan American Championships gold medalist. He represented Mexico at the 2024 Summer Olympics.

== Career ==
In July 2023, Grande competed at the 2023 Central American and Caribbean Games in archery and won gold medals in the team event, and mixed team event, along with Alejandra Valencia. In November 2023, he competed at the 2023 Pan American Games and won silver medals in the individual and team events, and a bronze medal in the mixed team event, along with Valencia. With the win, he earned an Olympic quota spot for Mexico. In June 2024, he was selected to represent Mexico at the 2024 Summer Olympics. He was eliminated in the round of 16 during the individual event.

In September 2025, he competed at the 2025 World Archery Championships and advanced to the quarterfinals of the individual event, before losing to eventual gold medalist Andrés Temiño.

In June 2026, he competed at the 2026 Pan American Archery Championships and won a gold medal in the mixed team event, along with Valencia. With the win, Mexico qualified for the 2027 Pan American Games. He also won a bronze medal in the individual event. In July 2026, he competed at the 2026 Central American and Caribbean Games and won gold medals in the individual, team and mixed team events.
