= 2021 World Archery Youth Championships =

- Location: Wrocław, Poland
- Start date: 10 August 2021
- End date: 15 August 2021

The 2021 World Archery Youth Championships was the 16th edition of World Archery Youth Championships. The event was held in Wrocław, Poland 10-15 August 2021, and was organised by World Archery. Junior events were held for those under 20, and Cadet for those under 18. The best performing nation was India.

== Medal table ==
* Host nation (Poland)

| Rank | Nation | Gold | Silver | Bronze | Total |
|---|---|---|---|---|---|
| 1 | India | 8 | 2 | 5 | 15 |
| 2 | France | 3 | 2 | 1 | 6 |
| 3 | Mexico | 3 | 1 | 0 | 4 |
| 4 | Japan | 2 | 1 | 0 | 3 |
| 5 | Estonia | 2 | 0 | 1 | 3 |
| 6 | Croatia | 1 | 0 | 0 | 1 |
| 6 | Slovenia | 1 | 0 | 0 | 1 |
| 8 | United States | 0 | 3 | 5 | 8 |
| 9 | Turkey | 0 | 3 | 2 | 5 |
| 10 | Russia | 0 | 3 | 1 | 4 |
| 10 | Spain | 0 | 3 | 1 | 4 |
| 12 | Ukraine | 0 | 1 | 1 | 2 |
| 13 | Denmark | 0 | 1 | 0 | 1 |
| 14 | Germany | 0 | 0 | 2 | 2 |
| 15 | Italy | 0 | 0 | 1 | 1 |
| Totals (15 entries) | | 20 | 20 | 20 | 60 |

== Medal summary ==
=== Junior ===
==== Recurve ====
| Event | Gold | Silver | Bronze |
|---|---|---|---|
| Men's individual | Tetsuya Aoshima; Japan | Stanislav Cheremiskin; Russia | Jonathan Vetter; Germany |
| Women's individual | Komalika Bari; India | Elia Canales; Spain | Charline Schwarz; Germany |
| Men's team | India; Dhiraj Bommadevara; Aditya Choudhary; Parth Salunkhe | Spain; Yun Sánchez; Manuel Santos del Valle; Jose Manuel Solera | United States; Trenton Cowles; Joonsuh Oh; Josef Scarboro |
| Women's team | Japan; Juri Shibuya; Waka Sonoda; Mao Watanabe | Russia; Tuiana Budazhapova; Mariia Gilmanova; Viktoria Namdakova | Ukraine; Varvara Illiash; Zhanna Naumova; Iryna Tretiakova |
| Mixed Team | India; Komalika Bari; Parth Salunkhe | Spain; Elia Canales; Yun Sánchez | Russia; Tuiana Budazhapova; Buianto Osorov |

==== Compound ====
| Event | Gold | Silver | Bronze |
|---|---|---|---|
| Men's individual | Robin Jäätma; Estonia | Matéo Mangelle; France | Rishabh Yadav; India |
| Women's individual | Amanda Mlinarić; Croatia | Sakshi Chaudhary; India | Meeri-Marita Paas; Estonia |
| Men's team | Mexico; Sebastián García; Luis Enrique Lezama Soto; Rodrigo Olvera | Turkey; Batuhan Akçaoğlu; Emircan Haney; Ömer Faruk Köse | United States; Cole Frederick; Cooper French; Matthew Russell |
| Women's team | Mexico; Asstrid Alanís; Mariana Bernal; Dafne Quintero | Russia; Ekaterina Rumyantseva; Nika Snetkova; Liliia Ulianova | United States; Madison Cox; Makenna Proctor; Anna Scarbrough |
| Mixed Team | Estonia; Meeri-Marita Paas; Robin Jäätma | Mexico; Dafne Quintero; Sebastián García | United States; Anna Scarbrough; Cole Frederick |

=== Cadet ===
==== Recurve ====
| Event | Gold | Silver | Bronze |
|---|---|---|---|
| Men's individual | Iban Bariteaud; France | Ludvig Njor Henriksen; Denmark | Bishal Changmai; India |
| Women's individual | Caroline Lopez; France | Ceren Koçur; Turkey | Manjiri Alone; India |
| Men's team | India; Amit Kumar; Bishal Changmai; Vickey Ruhal | France; Iban Bariteaud; Yanis Baudain; Baptiste Thirion | Spain; Jorge Daban Baines; Javier Mérida; Toni Roig Roig |
| Women's team | France; Amélie Cordeau; Caroline Lopez; Victoria Sebastian | Ukraine; Dzvenyslava Chernyk; Iryna Horlach; Daria Koval | India; Avani; Tamnna; Manjiri Manoj Alone |
| Mixed Team | India; Tamnna; Bishal Changmai | Japan; Sae Miwa; Haruma Yahata | France; Caroline Lopez; Iban Bariteaud |

==== Compound ====
| Event | Gold | Silver | Bronze |
|---|---|---|---|
| Men's individual | Aljaz Matija Brenk; Slovenia | Sawyer Sullivan; United States | Isaac Sullivan; United States |
| Women's individual | Selene Rodríguez; Mexico | Priya Gurjar; India | Parneet Kaur; India |
| Men's team | India; Sahil Chaudhary; Mihir Nitiny Apar; Kushal Dalal | United States; Sawyer Sullivan; Isaac Sullivan; Nathan Zimmerman | Turkey; Yunus Emre Arslan; Abdullah Aslım; Eren Kırca |
| Women's team | India; Parneet Kaur; Priya Gurjar; Ridhu Varshini Senthilkumar | Turkey; Hazal Burun; Nehir Sarıhan; Irmak Yüksel | Italy; Martina Del Duca; Giulia Di Nardo; Martina Serafini |
| Mixed Team | India; Priya Gurjar; Kushal Dalal | United States; Brielle Ochnich; Sawyer Sullivan | Turkey; Hazal Burun; Abdullah Aslım |
