= 2024 Pan American Youth and Masters Archery Championships =

- Location: San Salvador, El Salvador
- Dates: 6 to 12 May 2024

The 2024 Pan American Youth and Masters Archery Championships took place in San Salvador, El Salvador, from 6 to 12 May 2024.

== Medal summary ==
=== Recurve ===
Event	Gold	Silver	Bronze
Under 21 Men's individual	Andrés Hernández; Colombia	Juan Pablo Tellez Aguirre; Mexico	Francisco Javier Marquez Saenz; Mexico
Under 21 Women's individual	Mariana Fernanda Salas Mendez; Mexico	Lexlie Gómez; Colombia	Janna Hawash; Canada
Under 18 Men's individual	Carlos Lazaro Carvalho Batista; Brazil	Matthew Parmenter; United States	Felipe Fogliarini Tim; Brazil
Under 18 Women's individual	Sophia Baptista Soares Pinheiro; Brazil	Yareni Miranda Chab Quintal; Mexico	Kylie Oliver; Canada
Under 15 Men's individual	Liam Lee; United States	Nicolás Gómez; Colombia	Elliot Choi; United States
Under 15 Women's individual	Rebecca Recinos Contreras; Guatemala	Sofía Acosta; Colombia	Celeste Payano Zegarra; Peru
Under 50+ Men's individual	Mariano Del Rio; Chile	Claudio Roberto Marconi; Argentina	Juan Marcelo Alvarez; Argentina
Under 50+ Women's individual	Tatyana Muntyan; U.S. Virgin Islands	Janis Grellner; United States	Melissa Mcavoy; United States
Under 21 Men's team	Mexico; Juan Pablo Tellez Aguirre; Osvaldo Ramirez; Francisco Javier Marquez Saenz	Colombia; Andrés Hernández; Jacob Holguín; Brandon Moreno	Brazil; Leonardo Da Silva Oliveira; Eduardo Diamantino Almeida; Matheus Gomes
Under 21 Women's team	Mexico; Marisol Gonzalez Garcia; Mariana Fernanda Salas Mendez; Cristina Villalon Andrade	Canada; Janna Hawash; Audrey Khan Arevalo; Zohy Wilson	Colombia; Tania Arias; Isabella Forero; Lexlie Gómez
Under 18 Men's team	Brazil; Felipe Fogliarini Tim; Carlos Lazaro Carvalho Batista; Alex Kenzo Nakahama	Guatemala; Nicolás Briz Estrada; Julián Kepfer Faillace; Sebastián Osorio	Canada; Daniel Boutin; Keshav Kumar; Sahil Sahota
Under 21 Mixed team	Brazil; Isabelle Estevez; Matheus Gomes	Colombia; Lexlie Gómez; Andrés Hernández	Mexico; Cristina Villalon Andrade; Juan Pablo Tellez Aguirre
Under 18 Mixed team	Brazil; Sophia Baptista Soares Pinheiro; Felipe Fogliarini Tim	Guatemala; Sara Sofía Garcia Palacios; Sebastián Osorio	Colombia; Laurin Quintero; Daniel Jiménez
Under 15 Mixed team	Colombia; Sofía Acosta; Nicolás Gómez	Peru; Celeste Payano Zegarra; Santiago Gabriel Vasquez Leon	Chile; Emilia Castillo; Lucas Jamett
Under 15 Men's Doubles team	United States; Elliot Choi; Liam Lee	Chile; Salvador Benitez; Lucas Jamett	Colombia; Nicolás Gómez; Felipe Peralta
Under 15 Women's Doubles team	Colombia; Sofía Acosta; María Pinillos	Peru; Kiara Castillo Gamarra; Karen Mayumi Kawasaki Miyahira	Guatemala; Su Min Lee Rueda; Rebecca Recinos Contreras
Under 50+ Mixed team	United States; Janis Grellner; Michael Rossiter	United States Virgin Islands; Tatyana Muntyan; Bruce Arnold	Costa Rica; Anne Sander Mangel; Javier Rivas Blanco

=== Compound ===
Event	Gold	Silver	Bronze
Under 21 Men's individual	Carlos manuel Flores Gonzalez; Mexico	Elias Reyes Cravioto; Mexico	Sebastián Villegas; Colombia
Under 21 Women's individual	Adriana Castillo; Mexico	Juliana Gallego; Colombia	Paulina Abigail Ramirez Castillo; Guatemala
Under 18 Men's individual	Victor Esteban Portillo Lizardi; Mexico	Andrew Xie; United States	Seth Johnson; Canada
Under 18 Women's individual	Michelle Cardona; Colombia	Savannah O'Donohue; United States	María José Quintero; Colombia
Under 15 Men's individual	Harkunwar Singh Teja; Canada	Juan Almiro; Colombia	Simón Niño; Colombia
Under 15 Women's individual	Mariana Mantilla; Colombia	Susana Monsalve; Colombia	Nahomy Campos; El Salvador
Under 50+ Men's individual	Kenneth Brunko; United States	Luis Lopez; Mexico	Rodrigo Del Cid; Guatemala
Under 50+ Women's individual	Carrie Lin; United States	Joanne Yates-Boopsingh; Trinidad and Tobago	Winnette Alexis Lawrence; British Virgin Islands
Under 21 Men's team	Canada; Trevor Hoy; Damon Polowaniuk; Dustin Watson	Colombia; Andrés Ardila; Julián Gómez; Sebastián Villegas	Mexico; Carlos manuel Flores Gonzalez; Jorge Gomez; Elias Reyes Cravioto
Under 21 Women's team	Mexico; Regina Bernal; Adriana Castillo; Ximena Estrada	Guatemala; Danica Fránces Barrera Arana; Itcel Camposeco; Paulina Abigail Ramirez Castillo	Ecuador; Sheyla Anabel Cortez Pazmino; Dana Victoria Navarrete Vargas; Mia Navarrete Vargas
Under 21 Mixed team	Mexico; Adriana Castillo; Elias Reyes Cravioto	Colombia; Juliana Gallego; Sebastián Villegas	Canada; Chyler Sanders; Damon Polowaniuk
Under 18 Mixed team	United States; Savannah O'Donohue; Andrew Xie	Mexico; Lia carolina Lugo; Victor Esteban Portillo Lizardi	Canada; Anya Pinel; Riley Warwa

=== Barebow ===
Event	Gold	Silver	Bronze
Under 21 Men's individual	Elijah Hillensbeck; United States	Max Rossiter; United States	Not awarded
Under 21 Women's individual	Anastacia Godman; United States	Abigail Sparpaglione; United States	Not awarded
Under 18 Men's individual	Ethan Mitchell; United States	Sebastian Silva; Chile	Anthony Malik; United States
Under 18 Women's individual	Riley Adams; United States	Jamie Digiacomo; United States	Not awarded
Under 15 Mixed	Gabriel Urgelles; United States	Ayana Butt; United States	Not awarded
Under 50+ Men's individual	Dragos Olarescu; Canada	Hector Vigil; El Salvador	Not awarded
Under 50+ Women's individual	Cheri Gandy; United States	Angela Foley; Canada	Petula Workman; United States

== Medal table ==
* Host nation (El Salvador)

Rank	Nation	Gold	Silver	Bronze	Total
1	United States	12	8	4	24
2	Mexico	8	5	3	16
3	Colombia	5	10	6	21
4	Brazil	5	0	2	7
5	Canada	3	2	6	11
6	Guatemala	1	3	3	7
7	Chile	1	2	1	4
8	U.S. Virgin Islands	1	1	0	2
9	Peru	0	2	1	3
10	Argentina	0	1	1	2
10	El Salvador*	0	1	1	2
12	Trinidad and Tobago	0	1	0	1
13	British Virgin Islands	0	0	1	1
13	Costa Rica	0	0	1	1
13	Ecuador	0	0	1	1
Totals (15 entries)		36	36	31	103
