= Archery at the 2023 Pan American Games – Mixed team compound =

Mixed team compound at the 2023 Pan American Games
- Venue: Archery Center
- Dates: November 1 – November 4
- Competitors: 16 from 8 nations

Medalists
Gold medal	Sara López; Jagdeep Singh	Colombia
Silver medal	Kris Schaff; Alexis Ruiz	United States
Bronze medal	Sebastian García; Dafne Quintero	Mexico

The mixed team compound competition of the archery events at the 2023 Pan American Games was held from November 1 to 4 at the Archery Center in Santiago, Chile.

== Schedule ==
Date	Time	Round
November 1, 2023	14:00	Ranking Round
November 3, 2023	14:55	Quarterfinals
November 3, 2023	15:20	Semifinals
November 4, 2023	14:00	Final

== Records ==
Prior to this competition, the existing world and Pan American Games records were as follows:

- 144 arrow ranking round

World record	Mathias Fullerton (DEN); Tanja Gellenthien (DEN)	1429	Kraków, Poland	June 23, 2023
Pan American Games record	Sara López (COL); Daniel Muñoz (COL)	1414	Lima, Peru	August 7, 2019

- 16 arrows

World record	Mathias Fullerton (DEN); Tanja Gellenthien (DEN)	160 9X	Paris, France	August 18, 2023
Pan American Games record	María Eugenia González (ARG); Ivan Nikolajuk (ARG)	157	Lima, Peru	August 10, 2019

== Results ==
=== Ranking round ===
The results were as follows:

Rank	Archer	Nation	Score	Note
1	Alexis Ruiz; Kris Schaff	United States	1420	PR
2	Sara López; Jagdeep Singh	Colombia	1419	
3	Dafne Quintero; Sebastián García	Mexico	1398	
4	Larissa Oliveira; Luccas Abreu	Brazil	1394	
5	Paola Ramírez; Jean Pizarro	Puerto Rico	1392	T98;41
6	Paola Corado; Roberto Hernández	El Salvador	1392	T97;42
7	María José Zebadúa; Julio Barillas	Independent Athletes Team	1380	
8	Mariana Zúñiga; Alejandro Martín	Chile	1360	

=== Competition rounds ===
The results during the elimination rounds and final rounds were as follows:

==== Draw ====
Quarterfinals
1	United States	157
8	Chile	151
5	Puerto Rico	152
4	Brazil	153
3	Mexico	154
6	El Salvador	150
7	Independent Athletes Team	150
2	Colombia	154

Semifinals
1	United States	158 PR
4	Brazil	156
3	Mexico	155
2	Colombia	156

Final
1	United States	150
2	Colombia	156
Bronze medal match
4	Brazil	153
3	Mexico	155
