= Gaius Carter =

American archer (born 1998)

Personal information
- Born: June 7, 1998 (age 28)

Sport
- Sport: Archery
- Event: Compound
Medal record
Men's compound archery
Representing the United States
Pan American Championships
Gold medal – first place	2026 Tlaxcala	Individual
Gold medal – first place	2026 Tlaxcala	Team

Gaius Carter (born June 7, 1998) is an American archer competing in men's compound events. He is a two-time Pan American Championship gold medalist.

== Career ==
In June 2026, Carter competed at the 2026 Pan American Archery Championships and won a gold medal in the men's team event. Their qualification score of 2130 set a new Pan American Championship record, surpassing the previous record by five points. With the win, team USA earned a quota spot for the 2027 Pan American Games. He also won a gold medal in the individual event, defeating Roberto Hernández 149–148.
