= Archery at the 2023 Pan American Games – Women's individual compound =

Women's individual compound at the 2023 Pan American Games
- Venue: Archery Center
- Dates: November 1 – November 5
- Competitors: 16 from 10 nations

Medalists
Gold medal	Dafne Quintero	Mexico
Silver medal	Alexis Ruiz	United States
Bronze medal	Alejandra Usquiano	Colombia

The women's individual compound competition of the archery events at the 2023 Pan American Games was held from November 1 to 4 at the Archery Center in Santiago, Chile.

== Schedule ==
Date	Time	Round
November 1, 2023	14:00	Ranking Round
November 2, 2023	11:35	Round of 16
November 3, 2023	9:00	Quarterfinals
November 4, 2023	14:38	Semifinals
November 4, 2023	15:34	Final

== Records ==
Prior to this competition, the existing world and Pan American Games records were as follows:

- 72 arrow ranking round

World record	Ella Gibson (GBR)	715	Kraków, Poland	July 23, 2023
Pan American Games record	Sara López (COL)	708	Lima, Peru	August 7, 2019

- 15 arrows

World record	Sara López (COL)	150	Medellín, Colombia	July 23, 2022
Pan American Games record	Sara López (COL)	149	Lima, Peru	August 8, 2019

== Results ==
=== Ranking round ===
The results were as follows:

Rank	Archer	Nation	Score	Note
1	Sara López	Colombia	710	PR
2	Alexis Ruiz	United States	705	
3	Alejandra Usquiano	Colombia	701	
4	Olivia Dean	United States	699	
5	Dafne Quintero	Mexico	699	
6	Andrea Becerra	Mexico	694	
7	Paola Ramirez	Puerto Rico	691	
8	Larissa Oliveira	Brazil	689	
9	Paola Corado	El Salvador	687	
10	Eiry Nisi	Brazil	686	
11	Sofia Paiz	El Salvador	685	
12	Ana Hernández	Mexico	683	
13	María José Zebadúa	Independent Athletes Team	676	
14	Blanca Rodrigo	Ecuador	671	
15	Beatriz Aliaga	Peru	671	
16	Mariana Zúñiga	Chile	664	

=== Competition rounds ===
The results during the elimination rounds and final rounds were as follows:

==== Draw ====
Round of 16
1	S López (COL)	147
16	M Zúñiga (CHI)	142
9	P Corado (ESA)	146-T10
8	L Oliveira (BRA)	146-T9
5	D Quintero (MEX)	147
12	A Hernández (MEX)	145
13	MJ Zebadúa (EAI)	143
4	O Dean (USA)	145
3	A Usquiano (COL)	143
14	B Rodrigo (ECU)	138
11	S Paiz (ESA)	142
6	A Becerra (MEX)	145
7	P Ramirez (PUR)	146
10	E Nisi (BRA)	129
15	B Aliaga (PER)	141
2	A Ruiz (USA)	149

Quarterfinals
1	S López (COL)	148
9	P Corado (ESA)	141
5	D Quintero (MEX)	145
4	O Dean (USA)	142
3	A Usquiano (COL)	146
6	A Becerra (MEX)	144
7	P Ramirez (PUR)	147
2	A Ruiz (USA)	148

Semifinais
1	S López (COL)	146
2	D Quintero (MEX)	149
3	A Usquiano (COL)	144
2	A Ruiz (USA)	145

Final
5	D Quintero (MEX)	147
2	A Ruiz (USA)	145
Bronze match
1	S López (COL)	142
3	A Usquiano (COL)	143
