= 2019 World Archery Youth Championships =

- Location: Madrid, Spain
- Start date: 19 August 2019
- End date: 25 August 2019

The 2019 World Archery Youth Championships was the 17th edition of World Archery Youth Championships. The event was held in Madrid, Spain 19-25 August 2019, and was organised by World Archery. Junior events were held for those under 21, and Cadet for those under 18. Seven world records were broken during the course of the championships. The best performing nation was South Korea.

== Medal summary ==
=== Junior ===
==== Recurve ====
Event	Gold	Silver	Bronze
Men's individual	Kim Hyeon-jong; South Korea	Jack Williams; United States	Lee Jin-yong; South Korea
Women's individual	Valentina Acosta; Colombia	Ana Paula Vázquez; Mexico	Jang Min-hee; South Korea
Men's team	South Korea; Lee Jin-yong; Kim Pil-joong; Kim Hyeon-jong	Japan; Kuwae Yoshito; Ishii Yuta; Tomatsu Daisuke	Netherlands; Gijs Broeksma; Damian Vaes; Jonah Wilthagen
Women's team	South Korea; Lee Ga-hyun; Cha Song-hui; Jang Min-hee	Chinese Taipei; Sui Yun-ching; Yeh Yu-chen; Su Szu-ping	Spain; Elia Canales; Maria Pitarch; Monica Galisteo
Mixed Team	South Korea; Kim Hyeon-jong; Jang Min-hee	France; Clement Jacquey; Lisa Barbelin	China; Li Xinxin; Lin Liangwen

==== Compound ====
Event	Gold	Silver	Bronze
Men's individual	Anders Faugstad; Norway	Austin Taylor; Canada	Rodrigo Olvera; Mexico
Women's individual	Amanda Mlinarić; Croatia	İpek Tomruk; Turkey	Elisa Roner; Italy
Men's team	United States; Curtis Broadnax; Connor Sears; Cooper French	Mexico; Romeo Treviño; Pablo Pérez Chávez; Rodrigo Olvera	India; Sangampreet Singh Bisla; Sukhbeer Singh; Tushar Sanjay Phadtare
Women's team	United States; Savannah Vanderwier; Alexis Ruiz; Anna Scarbrough	Russia; Veronika Sanina; Elizaveta Knyazeva; Elizaveta Koroleva	Great Britain; Lucy Mason; Jessica Stretton; Ella Gibson
Mixed Team	India; Raginee Markoo; Sukhbeer Singh	Switzerland; Janine Hunsperger; Andrea Vallaro	Norway; Sunniva Lislevand; Anders Faugstad

=== Cadet ===
==== Recurve ====
Event	Gold	Silver	Bronze
Men's individual	Tai Yu-hsuan; Chinese Taipei	Caleb Urbina; Mexico	Kim Je-deok; South Korea
Women's individual	Komalika Bari; India	Sonoda Waka; Japan	Jang Mi; South Korea
Men's team	South Korea; Kim Je-deok; Cho Jeon-gu; Kim Myeong-gyu	Chinese Taipei; Tai Yu-hsuan; Su Yu-yang; Liu Tai-yen	Mexico; Diego Caballero; Caleb Urbina; Carlos Vaca
Women's team	South Korea; Jeon Do-hye; Jang Mi; Yeom Hye-jeong	Russia; Tuiana Budazhapova; Polina Krikunova; Nadezhda Kashina	Chinese Taipei; Yang Ya-jung; Shih Meng-chun; Chiu Yi-ching
Mixed Team	South Korea; Kim Je-deok; Yeom Hye-jeong	United States; Casey Kaufhold; Josef Scarboro	Japan; Sonoda Waka; Ito Kaisei

==== Compound ====
Event	Gold	Silver	Bronze
Men's individual	Sebastián García; Mexico	Daniil Kosenkov; Russia	Batuhan Akçaoğlu; Turkey
Women's individual	Arina Cherkezova; Russia	Natacha Stutz; Denmark	Elisa Bazzichetto; Italy
Men's team	United States; Matthew Russell; Cole Zeug; Sawyer Sullivan	Denmark; Mathias Fullerton; Tore Bjarnarson; Christoffer Berg	Turkey; Batuhan Akçaoğlu; Yakup Yıldız; Emirhan Kısa
Women's team	United States; Faith Miller; Raegan Bender; Makenzie Weatherspoon	Russia; Arina Cherkezova; Nika Snetkova; Darya Perfilyeva	Mexico; Mariana Bernal; Dafne Quintero; Ana Hernandez
Mixed Team	Mexico; Sebastián García; Dafne Quintero	United States; Cole Zeug; Makenzie Weatherspoon	Australia; Alyssa Mollema; Rory Blake

=== Medal table ===
* Host nation (Spain)

Rank	Nation	Gold	Silver	Bronze	Total
1	South Korea	7	0	4	11
2	United States	4	3	0	7
3	Mexico	2	3	3	8
4	India	2	0	1	3
5	Russia	1	4	0	5
6	Chinese Taipei	1	2	1	4
7	Norway	1	0	1	2
8	Colombia	1	0	0	1
8	Croatia	1	0	0	1
10	Japan	0	2	1	3
11	Denmark	0	2	0	2
12	Turkey	0	1	2	3
13	Canada	0	1	0	1
13	France	0	1	0	1
13	Switzerland	0	1	0	1
16	Italy	0	0	2	2
17	Australia	0	0	1	1
17	China	0	0	1	1
17	Great Britain	0	0	1	1
17	Netherlands	0	0	1	1
17	Spain	0	0	1	1
Totals (21 entries)		20	20	20	60
