= Ava Jones (archer) =

American archer

Personal information
- Born: Bowling Green, Kentucky, U.S.

Sport
- Sport: Archery
- Event: Barebow
Medal record
Women's barebow
Representing the United States
Pan American Championships
Gold medal – first place	2026 Tlaxcala	Individual

Ava Jones is an American archer competing in women's barebow events. She is a Pan American Championship gold medalist.

== Early life ==
Jones was born to Jeremy and Jen Jones, and has a younger brother, Alex. She was taught archery by her father. She attended Warren Central High School. On March 13, 2026, she committed to shoot for the University of Rio Grande.

== Career ==
In January 2024, she competed at the USA Archery Kentucky State Indoor Championship and set a U18 girls world record in the 18-metres with a score of 528. The next month, she broke her own world record, scoring 533 at the USA Indoor Nationals in Madisonville, Kentucky. In March 2025, she competed at the USA Archery Indoor Nationals Final and won the national title.

In February 2026, she competed at the USA Archery Indoor Nationals and won the women's national title. Her single round score of 544 set a new U21 women's world record, and national record. She also set national records for U21 women's 18-metres double round and barebow senior women 18-metres double round. She improved her 18-meter world record with a score of 549, while the overall score of 1087 improved the national record at both the U21 and senior level. On June 1, 2026, she was selected to represent the United States at the 2026 Pan American Archery Championships. She won a gold medal in the individual event. During qualification, she set a new Pan American Championship record in shooting 624, surpassing the previous record of 606.
