= 2025 World Archery Championships – Men's individual recurve =

Men's individual recurve at the 2025 World Archery Championships
- Venue: Gwangju International Archery Center
- Location: Gwangju, South Korea
- Dates: 9–11 September
- Competitors: 154 from 62 nations

Medalists
gold medal	Andrés Temiño	Spain
silver medal	Marcus D'Almeida	Brazil
bronze medal	Kim Je-deok	South Korea

The men's individual recurve competition at the 2025 World Archery Championships, which will take place from 6 to 8 September 2025 in Gwangju, South Korea.

== Schedule ==
All times are in Korea Standard Time (UTC+09:00).

Date	Time	Round
Monday, 8 September		Official practice
Tuesday, 9 September	09:00	Qualification round
Wednesday, 10 September	09:15; 09:53; 10:30	Elimination Round; First Round (1/48); Second round (1/24); Third Round (1/16)
Thursday, 11 September	10:02; 14:05; 15:00; 15:30; 15:42	Final Round; Fourth round (1/8); Quarter-finals; Semi-finals; Bronze-medal match Gold-medal match

== Qualification round ==
Results after 72 arrows.104 archers qualified to Elimination round.

High green denotes at least one round bye.
Light green denotes entering from first round.

Rank	Name	Nation	Score	10+X	X
1	Kim Woo-jin	South Korea	701	54	18
2	Andrés Temiño	Spain	691	46	15
3	Tang Chih-chun	Chinese Taipei	686	43	11
4	Kao Wenchao	China	684	40	18
5	Matteo Borsani	Italy	682	40	15
6	Yuki Kawata	Japan	681	39	9
7	Lee Woo-seok	South Korea	681	37	14
8	Eric Peters	Canada	680	39	9
9	Junya Nakanishi	Japan	680	39	15
10	Federico Musolesi	Italy	680	39	14
11	Kim Je-deok	South Korea	680	38	14
12	Thomas Chirault	France	678	39	16
13	Li Zhongyuan	China	678	34	11
14	Ilfat Abdullin	Kazakhstan	676	33	8
15	Cheng Hsiang-hui	Chinese Taipei	675	33	11
16	Oleksii Hunbin	Ukraine	674	39	17
17	Ryan Tyack	Australia	674	35	11
18	Wang Yan	China	674	34	12
19	Aldar Tsybikzhapov	Individual Neutral Athletes	674	34	9
20	Christian Stoddard	United States	674	30	10
21	Sib Sankar Maity	United Arab Emirates	673	36	9
22	Jorge Enríquez	Colombia	673	34	13
23	Matías Grande	Mexico	673	34	9
24	Riau Ega Agata Salsabilla	Indonesia	673	33	11
25	Moritz Wieser	Germany	673	33	10
26	Tetsuya Aoshima	Japan	673	32	13
27	Willem Bakker	Netherlands	673	31	10
28	Mauro Nespoli	Italy	673	31	8
29	Brady Ellison	United States	672	37	8
30	Mathias Kramer	Germany	672	31	12
31	Hugo Franco	Cuba	671	35	15
32	Marcus D'Almeida	Brazil	671	33	13
33	Ahmad Khoirul Baasith	Indonesia	671	33	9
34	Jean-Charles Valladont	France	671	32	15
35	Bair Torgubaev	Individual Neutral Athletes	671	29	7
36	Neeraj Chauhan	India	670	30	8
37	Jai Crawley	Australia	669	38	8
38	Roy Dror	Israel	669	34	15
39	Dhiraj Bommadevara	India	669	33	13
40	Ram Krishna Saha	Bangladesh	668	31	10
41	Jantsangiin Gantögs	Mongolia	668	30	15
42	Christian Christensen	Denmark	668	30	7
43	Jarno De Smedt	Belgium	668	29	10
44	Pablo Acha	Spain	668	29	9
45	Berkim Tümer	Turkey	668	27	5
46	Aleksandre Machavariani	Georgia	666	31	11
47	Buianto Tsyrendorzhiev	Individual Neutral Athletes	665	33	8
48	Artem Ovchynnikov	Ukraine	665	31	17
49	Lê Quốc Phong	Vietnam	665	30	11
50	Matheus Zwick Ely	Brazil	665	26	10
51	Vladyslav Lisniak	Ukraine	664	28	11
52	Patrick Huston	Great Britain	663	31	13
53	Amirkhon Sadikov	Uzbekistan	663	31	8
54	Den Habjan Malavašič	Slovenia	662	26	12
55	Trenton Cowles	United States	662	23	8
56	Keziah Chabin	Switzerland	660	24	5
57	Jesús Flores	Mexico	659	33	11
58	Santiago Arcila	Colombia	659	28	8
59	Brian Maxwell	Canada	658	31	10
60	Matheus Gomes	Brazil	658	24	10
61	Kwok Yin Chai	Hong Kong	657	29	11
62	Rahul Rahul	India	657	24	5
63	Berkay Akkoyun	Turkey	657	22	8
64	Senna Roos	Netherlands	655	27	8
65	Li Yue Long	Singapore	655	25	10
66	Su Yu-yang	Chinese Taipei	653	30	10
67	Mia Md Rakib	Bangladesh	653	24	11
68	Anders Vind Dalsgaard	Denmark	653	23	10
69	Baatarkhuyagiin Otgonbold	Mongolia	652	22	10
70	Andrés Gallardo	Chile	652	20	10
71	Tom Hall	Great Britain	651	27	9
72	Richard Krejčí	Czech Republic	651	20	7
73	Baptiste Addis	France	651	19	9
74	Mete Gazoz	Turkey	650	30	12
75	Ivan Bercha	Kazakhstan	650	23	5
76	Dorjsürengiin Dashnamjil	Mongolia	650	19	4
77	Bekzod Boborajabov	Uzbekistan	649	28	9
78	Arif Dwi Pangestu	Indonesia	649	27	8
79	Kaj Sjöberg	Sweden	649	25	11
80	Conor Hall	Great Britain	649	21	1
81	Lukas Kurz	Austria	649	20	6
82	Mansour Alwi	Saudi Arabia	648	23	6
83	Wong Sung Tin	Hong Kong	647	27	10
84	Mihajlo Stefanović	Serbia	647	22	6
85	Alen Remar	Croatia	647	22	6
86	Carlos Rojas	Mexico	647	20	6
87	Tomás Peña Leiva	Chile	646	27	10
88	Aaron Cox	Canada	646	25	8
89	Adam Li	Czech Republic	646	25	7
90	Nguyễn Minh Đức	Vietnam	646	25	4
91	Oskar Zavasnik	Slovenia	645	27	13
92	Mahammadali Aliyev	Azerbaijan	645	24	5
93	Hoàng Văn Lộc	Vietnam	644	24	6
94	Oskar Kasprowski	Poland	644	22	9
95	Youssof Tolba	Egypt	643	22	7
96	Žiga Ravnikar	Slovenia	643	20	5
97	Théo Carbonetti	Belgium	643	15	4
98	Bahaaeldin Aly	Egypt	642	21	6
99	Ahmad Al-Sada	Qatar	641	22	5
100	Jonathan Vetter	Germany	641	20	9
101	Dastan Karimov	Kazakhstan	641	20	7
102	Niv Frenkel	Israel	640	23	7
103	Florian Faber	Switzerland	640	18	5
104	Ondrej Franců	Slovakia	639	24	10
105	Jason Emmanuel Feliciano	Philippines	639	22	8
106	Thomas Rufer	Switzerland	639	18	5
107	Óscar Ticas	El Salvador	639	19	5
108	Andrés Aguilar	Chile	638	24	7
109	Khalifa Alkaabi	United Arab Emirates	638	23	7
110	Romans Sergejevs	Latvia	638	20	8
111	Abdur Rahman Alif	Bangladesh	637	17	8
112	Jakub Bąk	Poland	636	17	6
113	Ivan Banchev	Bulgaria	634	20	7
114	Daniel Medveczky	Slovakia	634	16	7
115	Andrés Hernández	Colombia	633	18	6
116	Feel Stinkens	Belgium	633	18	4
117	Rasmus Christensen	Denmark	633	18	3
118	Chu Pak Ho	Hong Kong	632	23	7
119	Maksymilian Osuch	Poland	632	21	6
120	Marko Vulić	Serbia	630	15	5
121	Anri Basiladze	Georgia	629	20	5
122	František Heřmánek	Czech Republic	628	19	8
123	Dan Olaru	Moldova	628	19	7
124	Temur Makievi	Georgia	628	16	8
125	Girvin Garcia	Philippines	626	20	6
126	Stanislav Stamov	Bulgaria	626	18	4
127	Javier Mérida González	Spain	625	13	8
128	Renian Nawew	Philippines	624	15	3
129	Eyal Roziner	Israel	619	15	4
130	Marcus Yiu	Australia	618	11	3
131	Emirbek Mashev	Kyrgyzstan	616	14	5
132	Christoffer Bjerendal	Sweden	613	15	3
133	Gleb Kononovs	Latvia	613	14	6
134	Ali Ranjabri	United Arab Emirates	613	7	2
135	Shokhjakhon Abdulkhamidov	Uzbekistan	610	12	6
136	Kay van Laarhoven	Netherlands	608	19	6
137	Anton Tsiareta	Individual Neutral Athletes	608	17	5
138	Samir Rustamov	Tajikistan	608	13	1
139	Camerin Pickering	Bermuda	608	11	5
140	Pablo Toral Pérez	Ecuador	607	13	4
141	Abdulrahman Al-Musa	Saudi Arabia	602	14	2
142	Werner Potgieter	South Africa	600	14	0
143	Ezizmuhammet Sahedov	Turkmenistan	598	14	6
144	Rashed Alsubaie	Saudi Arabia	590	14	5
145	Jaydon Roberts	Bermuda	581	6	3
146	Israel Madaye	Chad	574	8	5
147	Jovan Uverić	Serbia	574	7	3
148	Vepa Sahedov	Turkmenistan	569	7	1
149	Mohamed Khalf	Libya	557	8	13
150	Abdumalik Ganiev	Tajikistan	549	6	1
151	Jorakuly Jumayev	Turkmenistan	543	7	1
152	Dilans Gods-Romanovskis	Latvia	528	7	2
153	Eddie Icaza	Ecuador	525	4	1
154	Abdullah Al-Mashhadani	Iraq	43	0	0

== Final round ==
Quarterfinals
32	(Brazil) Marcus D'Almeida	7	30	29	28	29
8	(Canada) Eric Peters	1	27	27	28	27
5	(Italy) Matteo Borsani	6^{X}	28	29	29	28	29
29	(United States) Brady Ellison	5^{10}	26	29	28	29	30
3	(Chinese Taipei) Tang Chih-chun	1	27	30	28	27
11	(South Korea) Kim Je-deok	7	29	30	29	29
23	(Mexico) Matías Grande	4	28	29	29	27	30
2	(Spain) Andrés Temiño	6	28	30	28	29	30

Semifinals
32	(Brazil) Marcus D'Almeida	6	29	27	29	30	28
5	(Italy) Matteo Borsani	4	29	27	29	29	28
11	(South Korea) Kim Je-deok	4	29	28	28	30	29
2	(Spain) Andrés Temiño	6	29	29	28	29	30

Finals
32	(Brazil) Marcus D'Almeida	5^{9}	27	30	25	29	28
2	(Spain) Andrés Temiño	6^{10}	28	28	29	28	28
Third place
5	(Italy) Matteo Borsani	3	29	29	27	30	28
11	(South Korea) Kim Je-deok	7	29	30	28	28	29

== Elimination round ==
(+) Won the shoot-off by arrow closer to the center of the target.

=== Section 1 ===
1/48 finals
33	(Indonesia) A Bassith	1	26	26	27	29
80	(United Kingdom) C Hall	7	29	27	27	30
81	(Austria) L Kurz	2	25	27	25	27
32	(Brazil) M D'Almeida	6	26	24	28	29
17	(Australia) R Tyack	7	28	28	29	27
96	(Slovenia) Ž Ravnikar	1	27	25	29	25
65	(Singapore) LY Long	6	27	27	29	29	28
48	(Ukraine) A Ovchynnikov	4	28	28	22	25	27
49	(Vietnam) LQ Phong	5^{9}	24	28	27	30	28
64	(Netherlands) S Roos	6^{10}	30	27	25	30	30
97	(Belgium) T Carbonetti	2	28	25	27	24
16	(Ukraine) O Hunbin	6	27	27	29	29

1/24 finals
80	(United Kingdom) C Hall	2	27	27	25	26
32	(Brazil) M D'Almeida	6	27	27	29	30
17	(Australia) R Tiack	6	23	27	28	29	28
65	(Singapore) LY Long	4	28	27	26	28	28
64	(Netherlands) S Roos	6	29	27	29	29
16	(Ukraine) O Hunbin	2	27	27	28	29

1/16 finals
1	(South Korea) Kim W-j	4	28	28	28	29	30
32	(Brazil) M D'Almeida	6	28	28	30	29	30
17	(Australia) R Tyack	1	26	26	25	26
64	(Netherlands) S Roos	7	29	26	29	28

1/8 finals
32	(Brazil) M D'Almeida	6	30	30	29
64	(Netherlands) S Roos	0	28	27	26

=== Section 2 ===
1/48 finals
9	(Japan) J Nakanishi	7	28	30	29	29
104	(Slovakia) O Franců	1	26	26	29	27
57	(Mexico) J Flores	1	23	26	28	25
56	(Switzerland) K Chabin	7	28	29	28	29
41	(Mongolia) G Jantsangiin	6^{9+}	28	24	28	27	23
72	(Czech Republic) R Krejčí	5^{9}	27	28	27	27	28
89	(Czech Republic) A Li	0	26	27	27
24	(Indonesia) REA Salsabilla	6	29	29	29
25	(Germany) M Wieser	4	23	27	27	28	26
88	(Canada) A Cox	6	28	24	28	28	26
73	(France) B Addis	2	28	29	28	27
40	(Bangladesh) RK Saha	6	29	28	29	30

1/24 finals
9	(Japan) J Nakanishi	6	29	28	28
56	(Switzerland) K Chabin	0	26	26	26
41	(Mongolia) G Jantsangiin	3	27	29	26	26	26
24	(Indonesia) REA Salsabilla	7	27	28	28	28	29
88	(Canada) A Cox	0	27	28	17
40	(Bangladesh) RK Saha	6	28	29	29

1/16 finals
9	(Japan) J Nakanishi	7	30	27	29	29	30
24	(Indonesia) REA Salsabilla	3	28	30	28	29	27
40	(Bangladesh) RK Saha	4	25	25	27	27	29
8	(Canada) E Peters	6	29	28	26	27	29

1/8 finals
9	(Japan) J Nakanishi	3	28	29	28	26	29
8	(Canada) E Peters	7	29	29	27	28	30

=== Section 3 ===
1/48 finals
37	(Australia) J Crawley	6	26	28	28	27
76	(Mongolia) D Dorjsürengiin	2	24	26	28	27
85	(Croatia) A Remar	1	29	25	25	26
28	(Italy) M Nespoli	7	29	27	29	27
21	(United Arab Emirates) SS Maity	7	24	29	28	28
92	(Azerbaijan) M Aliyev	1	23	29	27	26
69	(Mongolia) O Baatarkhuyagiin	0	24	27	27
44	(Spain) P Acha	6	28	28	28
53	(Uzbekistan) A Sadikov	6	28	28	30	25
60	(Brazil) M Gomes	2	29	26	28	24
101	(Kazakhstan) D Karimov	4	26	28	27	28	27
12	(France) T Chirault	6	26	30	27	28	27

1/24 finals
37	(Australia) J Crawley	1	27	27	26	28
28	(Italy) M Nespoli	7	29	27	27	30
21	(United Arab Emirates) SS Maity	4	28	28	28	29	26
44	(Spain) P Acha	6	26	28	29	29	27
53	(Uzbekistan) A Sadikov	6^{9+}	27	29	27	27	27
12	(France) T Chirault	5^{9}	30	29	27	26	27

1/16 finals
5	(Italy) M Borsani	6^{9+}	28	27	27	28	28
28	(Italy) M Nespoli	5^{9}	27	29	29	26	28
44	(Spain) P Acha	6^{10}	30	26	28	27	28
53	(Uzbekistan) A Sadikov	5^{9}	29	27	27	27	29

1/8 finals
5	(Italy) M Borsani	6	28	27	28	29
44	(Spain) P Acha	2	27	28	27	26

=== Section 4 ===
1/48 finals
13	(China) Li ZY	6	29	27	29
100	(Germany) J Vetter	0	28	24	25
61	(Hong Kong) Kwok YC	1	27	26	27	26
52	(United Kingdom) P Huston	7	28	29	28	28
45	(Turkey) B Tümer	6	30	27	29	28	28
68	(Denmark) A Dalsgaard	4	27	29	26	29	23
93	(Vietnam) Hoàng VL	2	27	30	24	26
20	(United States) C Stoddard	6	29	27	27	28
29	(United States) B Ellison	6	29	28	27	28
84	(Serbia) M Stefanović	2	27	26	28	26
77	(Uzbekistan) B Boborajabov	6	29	28	29
36	(India) N Chauhan	0	27	27	26

1/24 finals
13	(China) Li ZY	6^{10}	28	26	29	28	28
52	(United Kingdom) P Huston	5^{9}	27	28	30	28	27
45	(Turkey) B Tümer	7	28	29	28	28
20	(United States) C Stoddard	1	28	28	27	26
29	(United States) B Ellison	6^{10}	30	26	29	29	27
77	(Uzbekistan) B Boborajabov	5^{9}	30	27	29	28	27

1/16 finals
13	(China) Li ZY	0	29	28	27
45	(Turkey) B Tümer	6	30	29	28
29	(United States) B Ellison	6	28	27	27	29	29
4	(China) Kao WC	4	25	28	29	25	28

1/8 finals
45	(Turkey) B Tümer	4	29	26	26	29	29
29	(United States) B Ellison	6	29	27	28	27	29

=== Section 5 ===
1/48 finals
35	(Individual Neutral Athletes) B Torgubaev	6	29	29	28	27
78	(Indonesia) AD Pangestu	2	29	28	23	24
83	(Hong Kong) Wong ST	4	25	29	26	26	28
30	(Germany) M Kramer	6	29	28	26	28	28
19	(Individual Neutral Athletes) A Tsybikzhapov	7	26	27	28	29	29
94	(Poland) O Kasprowski	3	27	25	28	28	25
67	(Bangladesh) MM Rakib	0	28	27	27
46	(Georgia (country)) A Machavariani	6	30	28	28
51	(Ukraine) V Lisniak	5^{8}	28	30	27	23	29
62	(India) R Rahul	6^{9}	28	28	26	27	30
99	(Qatar) A Al-Sada	4	26	25	28
12	(Kazakhstan) I Abdullin	6	28	30	29

1/24 finals
35	(Individual Neutral Athletes) B Torgubaev	2	25	29	26	25
30	(Germany) M Kramer	6	29	28	29	26
19	(Individual Neutral Athletes) A Tsybikzhapov	1	28	28	26	29
46	(Georgia (country)) A Machavariani	7	28	29	28	30
62	(India) R Rahul	6	29	28	26	29	29
12	(Kazakhstan) I Abdullin	4	26	29	29	28	24

1/16 finals
3	(Chinese Taipei) Tang C-c	6^{10}	30	27	27	26	30
30	(Germany) M Kramer	5^{9}	30	29	25	29	27
46	(Georgia (country)) A Machavariani	6^{X}	28	26	27	30	28
62	(India) R Rahul	5^{8}	28	30	28	26	27

1/8 finals
3	(Chinese Taipei) Tang C-c	7	28	29	28	26	30
46	(Georgia (country)) A Machavariani	3	26	24	28	28	29

=== Section 6 ===
1/48 finals
11	(South Korea) Kim J-d	6	30	26	29
102	(Israel) N Frenkel	0	26	22	27
59	(Canada) B Maxwell	6	27	28	28	29
54	(Slovenia) D Habjan Malavašič	2	27	26	28	28
43	(Belgium) J De Smedt	5^{9}	30	26	29	27	27
70	(Chile) A Gallardo	6^{X}	26	28	28	29	27
91	(Slovenia) O Zavasnik	5^{8}	28	28	29	29	27
22	(Colombia) J Enríquez	6^{9}	26	29	30	27	27
27	(Netherlands) W Bakker	1	28	25	27	26
86	(Mexico) C Rojas	7	29	29	27	28
75	(Kazakhstan) I Bercha	4	29	28	26	28	26
38	(Israel) R Dror	6	27	28	27	28	29

1/24 finals
11	(South Korea) Kim J-d	6^{8+}	27	27	28	28	29
59	(Canada) B Maxwell	5^{8}	29	28	26	27	29
70	(Chile) A Gallardo	6^{10+}	26	29	25	28	28
22	(Colombia) J Enríquez	5^{10}	28	28	27	28	26
86	(Mexico) C Rojas	5^{8}	27	26	29	28	29
38	(Israel) R Dror	6^{9}	26	28	29	26	30

1/16 finals
11	(South Korea) Kim J-d	7	29	28	29	29	27
70	(Chile) A Gallardo	3	29	29	26	27	22
29	(Israel) R Dror	3	27	28	26	26	25
6	(Japan) Y Kawata	7	27	27	28	30	29

1/8 finals
11	(South Korea) Kim J-d	7	29	29	28	30
6	(Japan) Y Kawata	1	25	27	28	29

=== Section 7 ===
1/48 finals
39	(India) D Bommadevara	2	29	28	28	29
74	(Turkey) M Gazoz	6	29	29	29	29
87	(Chile) T Peña Leiva	3	25	28	28	29	27
26	(Japan) T Aoshima	7	29	30	28	27	29
23	(Mexico) M Grande	7	27	29	29	28	29
90	(Vietnam) Nguyễn MĐ	3	28	29	27	27	28
71	(United Kingdom) T Hall	6	26	28	27	28
42	(Denmark) C Christensen	2	28	24	26	26
55	(United States) T Cowles	6	29	28	28	29
58	(Colombia) S Arcila	2	28	29	26	24
103	(Switzerland) F Faber	5^{8}	29	28	27	28	27
10	(Italy) F Musolesi	6^{10}	29	25	29	30	26

1/24 finals
74	(Turkey) M Gazoz	4	28	30	30	28	29
26	(Japan) T Aoshima	6	28	30	30	29	29
23	(Mexico) M Grande	6	29	28	28	29
71	(United Kingdom) T Hall	2	27	27	29	25
55	(United States) T Cowles	2	27	26	27	28
10	(Italy) F Musolesi	6	26	27	28	30

1/16 finals
7	(South Korea) Lee W-s	6	27	27	28	28	28
26	(Japan) T Aoshima	4	28	26	28	26	28
23	(Mexico) M Grande	7	25	29	29	26	29
10	(Italy) F Musolesi	3	29	25	27	26	27

1/8 finals
7	(South Korea) Lee W-s	2	28	29	27	26
23	(Mexico) M Grande	6	29	27	28	29

=== Section 8 ===
1/48 finals
15	(Chinese Taipei) Cheng H-h	7	28	28	27	27	30
98	(Egypt) B Aly	3	26	28	29	25	27
63	(Turkey) B Akkoyun	6	30	29	29
50	(Brazil) M Zwick Ely	0	28	27	27
47	(Individual Neutral Athletes) B Tsyrendorzhiev	1	27	27	27	27
66	(Chinese Taipei) Su Y-y	7	30	27	29	30
95	(Egypt) Y Tolba	0	24	18	24
18	(China) Wang Y	6	27	27	27
31	(Cuba) H Franco	6	27	29	28
82	(Saudi Arabia) M Alwi	0	24	24	27
79	(Sweden) K Sjöberg	3	26	30	26	28	27
34	(France) J-C Valladont	7	27	28	26	30	28

1/24 finals
15	(Chinese Taipei) Cheng H-h	5^{9}	29	27	27	26	29
63	(Turkey) B Akkoyun	6^{9+}	26	27	30	28	28
66	(Chinese Taipei) Su Y-y	6^{X}	29	27	28	27	26
18	(China) Wang Y	5^{7}	29	26	27	28	28
31	(Cuba) H Franco	6	25	29	28	29
34	(France) J-C Valladont	2	30	27	26	26

1/16 finals
63	(Turkey) B Akkoyun	3	28	29	27	27	25
66	(Chinese Taipei) Su Y-y	7	29	28	29	27	29
31	(Cuba) H Franco	1	27	28	26	27
2	(Spain) A Temiño	7	29	28	27	29

1/8 finals
66	(Chinese Taipei) Su Y-y	4	28	29	27	26	28
2	(Spain) A Temiño	6	28	27	28	26	29
