= Archery at the 2023 Central American and Caribbean Games =

- Venue: Polígono de Tiro con Arco
- Location: (El Salvador) Santa Tecla
- Dates: 2 – 6 July
- Competitors: 116 from 18 nations

The archery competitions at the 2023 Central American and Caribbean Games were held in Santa Tecla, El Salvador from 2 to 6 July at the Polígono de Tiro con Arco.

== Participating nations ==
A total of 18 countries qualified athletes. The number of athletes a nation entered is in parentheses beside the name of the country.

- Bahamas (2)
- Barbados (1)
- Bermuda (2)
- Colombia (12)
- Costa Rica (5)
- Cuba (8)
- Dominican Republic (10)
- El Salvador (12)
- Guatemala (12)
- Guadeloupe (3)
- Jamaica (1)
- Martinique (3)
- Mexico (12)
- Panama (3)
- Puerto Rico (12)
- Trinidad and Tobago (4)
- Venezuela (7)
- Virgin Islands (2)

== Medal table ==
* Host nation (El Salvador)

Rank	Nation	Gold	Silver	Bronze	Total
1	Mexico (MEX)	6	2	2	10
2	Colombia (COL)	1	6	1	8
3	Centro Caribe Sports (CCS)	1	0	2	3
4	Puerto Rico (PUR)	1	0	1	2
5	U.S. Virgin Islands (ISV)	1	0	0	1
6	El Salvador (ESA)*	0	1	1	2
7	Venezuela (VEN)	0	1	0	1
8	Cuba (CUB)	0	0	3	3
Totals (8 entries)		10	10	10	30

== Medal summary ==
=== Men's events ===
Event	Gold	Silver	Bronze
Individual compound	Jean Pizarro (PUR)	Jagdeep Singh (COL)	Centro Caribe Sports (CCS); Julio Barillas
Team compound	Centro Caribe Sports (CCS); José Marcelo Del Cid; Julio Barillas; Pedro Salazar	Mexico (MEX); Sebastián García; Miguel Becerra; Juan del Río	El Salvador (ESA); Miguel Veliz; Douglas Nolasco; Roberto Hernández
Individual recurve	Nicholas D'Amour (ISV)	Jorge Enríquez (COL)	Hugo Franco (CUB)
Team recurve	Mexico (MEX); Matías Grande; Carlos Rojas; Caleb Urbina	Colombia (COL); Santiago Arcila; Daniel Betancur; Jorge Enríquez	Cuba (CUB); Hugo Franco; Juan José Santiesteban; Javier Vega

=== Women's events ===
Event	Gold	Silver	Bronze
Individual compound	Dafne Quintero (MEX)	Andrea Becerra (MEX)	Sara López (COL)
Team compound	Mexico (MEX); Dafne Quintero; Ana Sofía Hernández Jeon; Andrea Becerra	Colombia (COL); Juliana Gallego; Alejandra Usquiano; Sara López	Puerto Rico (PUR); Paola Ramírez; Adriana Acevedo; Marla Cintrón
Individual recurve	Alejandra Valencia (MEX)	Ana Rendón (COL)	Ángela Ruiz (MEX)
Team recurve	Mexico (MEX); Aída Román; Ángela Ruiz; Alejandra Valencia	Colombia (COL); Valentina Contreras; Ana Rendón; Maira Sepúlveda	Centro Caribe Sports (CCS); Nancy Enríquez; Cinthya Pellecer; Sara Stahl

=== Mixed events ===
Event	Gold	Silver	Bronze
Team compound	Colombia (COL); Sara López; Sebastián Arenas	El Salvador (ESA); Sofía Paiz; Roberto Hernández	Mexico (MEX); Dafne Quintero; Miguel Becerra
Team recurve	Mexico (MEX); Matías Grande; Alejandra Valencia	Venezuela (VEN); Daniela Chacón; Ricardo Vásquez	Cuba (CUB); Hugo Franco; Maydenia Sarduy
