= 2026 Pan American Archery Championships =

- Location: Tlaxcala, Mexico
- Dates: 22 to 28 June 2026

The 2026 Pan American Archery Championships took place in Tlaxcala, Mexico, from 22 to 28 June 2026.

== Medal summary ==
=== Recurve ===
Event	Gold	Silver	Bronze
Men's individual	Marcus Vinicius D'Almeida; Brazil	Eric Peters; Canada	Matías Grande; Mexico
Women's individual	Jennifer Mucino-Fernandez; United States	Casey Kaufhold; United States	Ángela Ruiz; Mexico
Men's team	United States; Brady Ellison; Nicholas D'Amour; Christian Stoddard	Colombia; Jorge Enríquez; Santiago Arcila; Santiago Cruz	Chile; Andrés Gallardo; Tomás Peña; Ángel Vega
Women's team	United States; Jennifer Mucino-Fernandez; Casey Kaufhold; Olivia Martin	Mexico; Alejandra Valencia; Ángela Ruiz; Ana Paula Vázquez	Brazil; Ana Luiza Caetano; Isabelle Estevez; Ane Marcelle dos Santos
Mixed team	Mexico; Alejandra Valencia; Matías Grande	United States; Jennifer Mucino-Fernandez; Brady Ellison	Brazil; Ana Luiza Caetano; Marcus Vinicius D'Almeida

=== Compound ===
Event	Gold	Silver	Bronze
Men's individual	Gaius Carter; United States	Roberto Hernández; El Salvador	Isaac Sullivan; United States
Women's individual	Alexis Ruiz; United States	Sara López; Colombia	Alejandra Usquiano; Colombia
Men's team	United States; James Lutz; Louis Price; Gaius Carter	Colombia; Pablo Gómez; Sebastián Arenas; Jagdeep Singh	Mexico; Sebastián García; Rodrigo González; Juan del Río
Women's team	Mexico; Andrea Becerra; Dafne Quintero; Adriana Castillo	Colombia; Alejandra Usquiano; Sara López; Mariana Rodríguez	United States; Alexis Ruiz; Liko Arreola; Olivia Dean
Mixed team	United States; Alexis Ruiz; James Lutz	Guatemala; Danica Barrera; Julio Barillas	Mexico; Andrea Becerra; Sebastián García

=== Barebow ===
Event	Gold	Silver	Bronze
Men's individual	Denis Castellanos; Argentina	Michael Weaver; United States	Binh Tran; United States
Women's individual	Ava Jones; United States	Johana Czako; United States	Elizabeth Howe; United States

== Medal table ==
* Host nation (Mexico)

Rank	Nation	Gold	Silver	Bronze	Total
1	United States	8	4	4	16
2	Mexico*	2	1	4	7
3	Brazil	1	0	2	3
4	Argentina	1	0	0	1
5	Colombia	0	4	1	5
6	Canada	0	1	0	1
6	El Salvador	0	1	0	1
6	Guatemala	0	1	0	1
9	Chile	0	0	1	1
Totals (9 entries)		12	12	12	36
