= Noelle W. Arnold =

American educator

Noelle Witherspoon Arnold
- Education: University of Alabama (BA, MA, EdS, PhD)
- Known for: Womanist spirituality, educational ethnography
- Scientific career
- Fields: Educational administration
- Workplaces: Ohio State University
- Doctoral advisor: Natalie Adams

Noelle Witherspoon Arnold is a senior associate dean and professor in the College of Education and Human Ecology at Ohio State University. She is the first female African American president of the University Council for Educational Administration, an academic organization for those researching educational administration in North America.

== Education ==
Arnold attended the University of Alabama. There, she earned her PhD in educational administration.

== Career ==
Arnold began her academic career in 2007 at Louisiana State University, where she served as an assistant professor in educational theory, policy and practice until 2010. During her time at Louisiana State University, she also served as co-coordinator for the Educational Leadership Doctoral Program from 2008 to 2009, and as an affiliate faculty member in women and gender studies the next year.

Arnold joined the faculty of the University of Missouri–Columbia as an assistant professor of educational leadership and policy analysis in 2010, a position she served in the position for three years. She also served as program coordinator of PK–12 educational leadership and policy studies from 2012 to 2013 and as an affiliate faculty member in Black studies from 2012 to 2015 at the University of Missouri-Columbia.

Arnold subsequently joined Ohio State University's Department of Educational Studies, where she was named an associate professor by 2015. Additionally, she has served as senior associate dean at Ohio State University. In this role, she has lead the Office of Engagement, Discovery, and Global Education that participated in outreach, partnerships and engagement, graduate student training and professional development, and international and global education.

A former administrator at the district and state level, Arnold has served as a consultant for National Public Radio and throughout the United States advising districts in school improvement, culture and race mediation, STEM leadership for education and teaching and leading in urban and rural contexts.

== Publications ==
Arnold has more than 40 publications and her articles have appeared in leading educational journals, including the Teachers College Record, International Journal of Leadership in Education, Journal of Negro Education, International Journal of Educational Reform and the Journal of Educational Administration. She has nine books published or in press, including, most recently, the Handbook of Urban Educational Leadership.

Arnold serves as the series editor of New Directions in Educational Leadership.

== Personal life ==
Arnold is married to former Ohio State historian Bruce Makoto Arnold.
