= Archery at the 2010 South American Games – Women's compound team =

The Women's compound team event at the 2010 South American Games had its qualification during the individual qualification on March 21, and the finals on March 24. Since there were only 3 teams, no bronze medal was awarded.

== Medalists ==
Gold	Silver
Olga Bosh; Betty Flores; Luzmary Guedez; Venezuela	Alejandra Usquiano; Natalia Londoño; Isabel Salazar; Colombia

== Results ==
=== Qualification ===
Rank	Team	Score
1	Venezuela	4097
1	Luzmary Guedez	1372
1	Olga Bosh	1370
1	Betty Flores	1355
2	Brazil	3635
2	Talita Araujo	1353
2	Dirma Miranda dos Santos	1345
2	Daniela Areias	1309
3	Colombia	3620
3	Natalia Londoño	1368
3	Isabel Salazar	1328
3	Alejandra Usquiano	1305

=== Draw ===
Semifinals
1	Venezuela	bye
3	Colombia	222
2	Brazil	211

Finals
1	Venezuela	220
3	Colombia	213
