= Kris Schaff =

American compound archer (born 1992)

Personal information
- Born: September 24, 1992 (age 33)

Sport
- Country: United States
- Sport: Archery
- Event: Compound
Medal record
Men's compound archery
Representing United States
World Championships
Gold medal – first place	2017 Mexico City	Team
Gold medal – first place	2021 Yankton	Team
World Games
Bronze medal – third place	2017 Wrocław	Mixed team
Pan American Games
Silver medal – second place	2023 Santiago	Team
Silver medal – second place	2023 Santiago	Mixed team
Pan American Championships
Silver medal – second place	2018 Medellín	Team

Kris Schaff (born September 24, 1992) is an American compound archer. He won the gold medal in the men's team event at the 2017 World Archery Championships held in Mexico City, Mexico. In 2021, he also won the gold medal in the men's team event at the World Archery Championships held in Yankton, United States.

In 2017, Schaff and Cassidy Cox won the bronze medal in the mixed team compound event at the World Games held in Wrocław, Poland. The following year, he won the silver medal in the men's team event at the 2018 Pan American Archery Championships held in Medellín, Colombia.

Schaff won two silver medals at the 2023 Pan American Games held in Santiago, Chile. He won the silver medal in the men's team compound event and in the mixed team compound event.
