= Parth Salunkhe =

Indian archer

Personal information
- Full name: Parth Sushant Salunkhe
- Nationality: Indian
- Born: November 4, 2003 (age 22) Satara, Maharashtra

Sport
- Sport: Archery

Achievements and titles
- Highest world ranking: 32
Medal record
Men's recurve archery
Representing India
World Cup
Bronze medal – third place	2025 Shanghai	Individual
Asian Championships
Silver medal – second place	2021 Dhaka	Men's team
Asian Cup
Gold medal – first place	2022 Phuket	Men's team
Gold medal – first place	2022 Sulaymaniyah	Men's team
Gold medal – first place	2022 Sharjah	Men's team
Gold medal – first place	2023 Taoyuan	Men's team
Silver medal – second place	2022 Phuket	Mixed team
Silver medal – second place	2022 Sulaymaniyah	Mixed team
Silver medal – second place	2022 Sharjah	Mixed team
Silver medal – second place	2023 Singapore	Men's team
Silver medal – second place	2023 Singapore	Individual
Bronze medal – third place	2022 Sulaymaniyah	Individual
Bronze medal – third place	2022 Sharjah	Individual
World Youth Championships
Gold medal – first place	2021 Wrocław	Men's team
Gold medal – first place	2021 Wrocław	Mixed team
Gold medal – first place	2023 Limerick	Individual
Bronze medal – third place	2023 Limerick	Mixed team

Parth Sushant Salunkhe (born 4 November 2003) is an Indian recurve archer. He's a silver medalist at the Asian Championships as well as a 4-time gold, 5-time silver, 2-time bronze medalist at the Asian Cup. He's also a 3-time gold medalist and 1-time bronze medalist at the World Youth Championships.

== Early life ==
Salunkhe was born in Satara, Maharashtra. His father Sushant Salunkhe is a secondary school English teacher. He completed his studies at New English Medium School and Shripatrao Patil High School.

== Career ==
In 2023, Salunkhe become the recurve men's individual champion at the World Youth Archery Championships. He was the first Indian male archer to achieve this.
