= Komalika Bari =

Indian archer (born 2002)

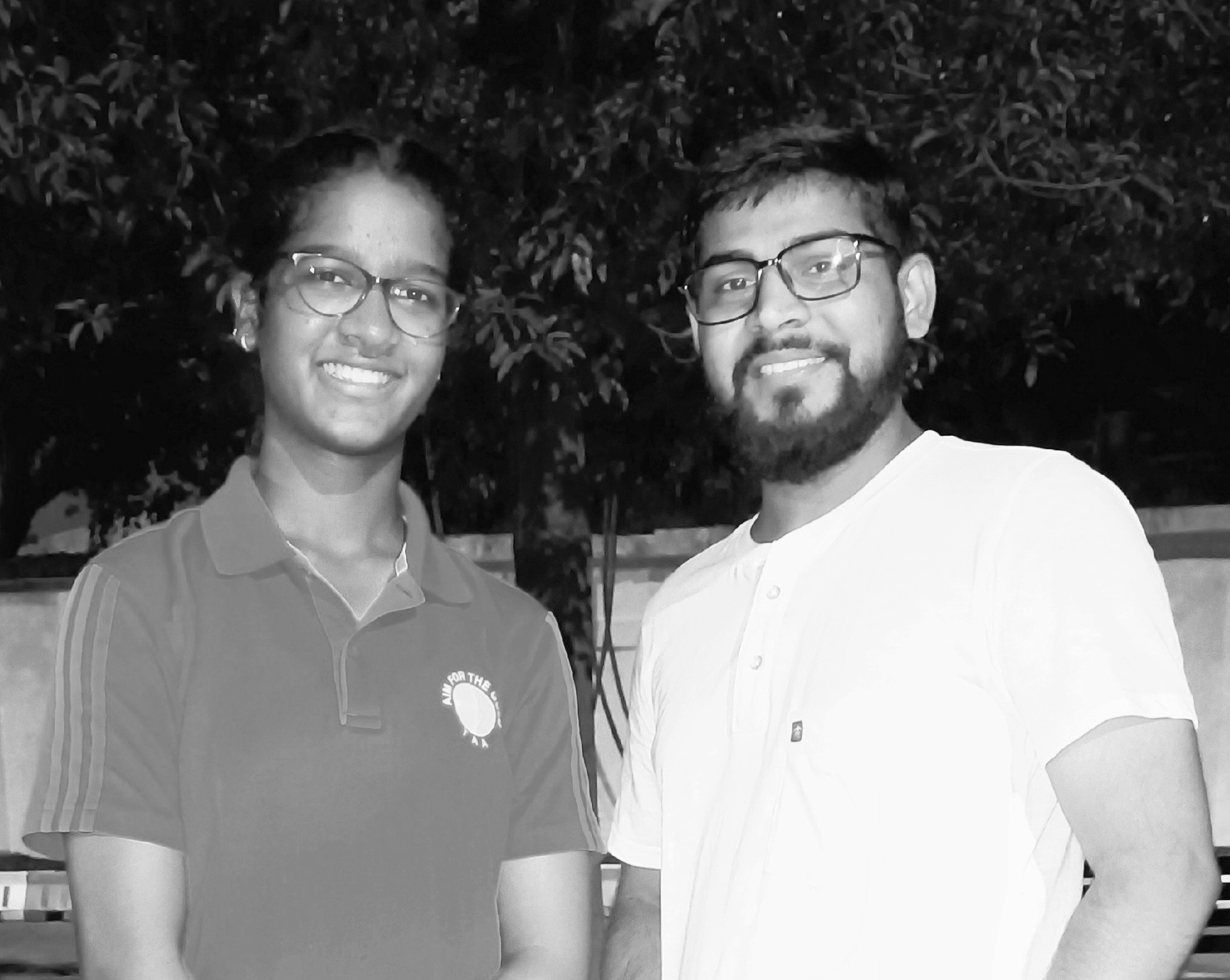
- Komalika in 2021 with Ansuman Bhagat

Personal information
- Nationality: Indian
- Born: 5 February 2002 (age 24) Jamshedpur, Jharkhand, India
- Education: Shiksha Niketan

Sport
- Country: India
- Sport: Archery
- Club: Tata Archery Academy
- Team: Indian Archery Women Team
Medal record
Women's archery
Representing India
| Event | 1st | 2nd | 3rd |
|---|---|---|---|
| World Youth Archery Championships | 2 | - | - |
| World Cadet Archery Championships | 1 | - | - |
| Total | 3 | 0 | 0 |
World Youth Championships
| Gold medal – first place | 2021 Wroclaw | Women's Single's |
| Gold medal – first place | 2021 Wroclaw | Mixed Double's |
World Cadet Championships
| Gold medal – first place | 2019 Madrid | Women's Single's |

Komalika Bari (born 5 February 2002 in Jamshedpur) is only the third Indian player to win the world title at the Tata Archery Academy's Cadet World Youth Archery Championships. She made her mark to ensure her place in the Indian team for elite events including the World Championships and the Olympic Test Event. She participated in world u-18 championship held in Wroclaw in August.
