= Archery at the 2026 Central American and Caribbean Games =

- Venue: Campo de Tiro con Arco
- Location: Santo Domingo Este, Dominican Republic
- Dates: 24–29 July

The archery competition at the 2026 Central American and Caribbean Games was held in Santo Domingo Este, Dominican Republic, from 24 to 29 July 2026 at the Campo de Tiro con Arco.

== Participating nations ==
A total of 20 nations qualified athletes. The number of athletes a nation entered is in parentheses beside the name of the country.

- Bahamas (1)
- Barbados (1)
- Bermuda (1)
- British Virgin Islands (1)
- Colombia (12)
- Cuba (10)
- Dominican Republic (12)
- El Salvador (12)
- Guadeloupe (1)
- Guatemala (12)
- Guyana (2)
- Honduras (2)
- Jamaica (1)
- Martinique (3)
- Mexico (12)
- Panama (8)
- Puerto Rico (9)
- Trinidad and Tobago (7)
- Venezuela (7)
- Virgin Islands (2)

== Medal table ==
* Host nation (Dominican Republic)

Rank	Nation	Gold	Silver	Bronze	Total
1	Mexico (MEX)	5	5	2	12
2	Colombia (COL)	2	4	2	8
3	El Salvador (ESA)	2	0	1	3
4	Puerto Rico (PUR)	1	0	0	1
5	Guatemala (GUA)	0	1	2	3
6	Cuba (CUB)	0	0	2	2
7	Venezuela (VEN)	0	0	1	1
Totals (7 entries)		10	10	10	30

== Medal summary ==
=== Recurve ===
Event	Gold	Silver	Bronze
Men's individual	Matías Grande; Mexico	Jorge Enríquez; Colombia	Raúl Rodríguez; Mexico
Women's individual	Alejandra Valencia; Mexico	Ana Paula Vázquez; Mexico	Ana Rendón; Colombia
Men's team	Mexico; Francisco Padilla; Matías Grande; Raúl Rodríguez	Colombia; Jorge Enríquez; Santiago Arcila; Santiago Cruz	Cuba; Javier Vega; Iván Pérez; Hugo Franco
Women's team	Mexico; Ana Paula Vázquez; Alejandra Valencia; Ángela Ruiz	Colombia; Ana Rendón; Isabella Forero; Tania Arias	El Salvador; Marcela Cortez; Jimena Vigil; Jocelyn Urías
Mixed team	Mexico; Alejandra Valencia; Matías Grande	Colombia; Ana Rendón; Santiago Arcila	Cuba; Larissa Pagán; Hugo Franco

=== Compound ===
Event	Gold	Silver	Bronze
Men's individual	Jean Pizarro; Puerto Rico	Rodrigo González; Mexico	José del Cid; Guatemala
Women's individual	Sara López; Colombia	Andrea Becerra; Mexico	Ana Hernández; Mexico
Men's team	El Salvador; Douglas Nolasco; Miguel Veliz; Roberto Hernández	Mexico; Lot Méndez; Rodrigo González; Sebastián García	Guatemala; Pedro Salazar; José del Cid; Julio Barillas
Women's team	El Salvador; Camila Alvarenga; Paola Corado; Sofía Paiz	Mexico; Ana Hernández; Dafne Quintero; Andrea Becerra	Colombia; Alejandra Usquiano; Mariana Rodríguez; Sara López
Mixed team	Colombia; Sara López; Pablo Gómez	Guatemala; Danica Barrera; José del Cid	Venezuela; Ana Mendoza; Fraiber Rodríguez
