= Adriana Castillo =

Uruguayan footballer (born 1990)

Personal information
- Full name: Adriana Castillo Herrera
- Date of birth: 5 May 1990 (age 36)
- Place of birth: Montevideo, Uruguay
- Height: 1.61 m (5 ft 3 1/2 in)
- Position: Forward

Team information
- Current team: Nacional

Senior career*
Years	Team	Apps	(Gls)
2004	Progreso		
2005–2008	Rampla Juniors		
2009–2010	Colo-Colo		
2011–2012	Cerro		
2013	Santiago Morning		
2014–2015	Cerro	11	(5)
2015–	Nacional	62	(49)

International career^{‡}
2010–	Uruguay	3+	(0)
- * Club domestic league appearances and goals ‡ National team caps and goals as of 3 March 2019

Adriana Castillo Herrera (born 5 May 1990) is a Uruguayan footballer who plays as a forward for Club Nacional de Football and the Uruguay women's national team.

== Club career ==
Castillo played in Chile for Colo-Colo.

== International career ==
Castillo played for Uruguay in three Copa América Femenina editions (2010, 2014 and 2018).
