= Andrés Temiño =

Spanish archer (born 2004)

Personal information
- Full name: Andrés Temiño Mediel
- Born: 24 February 2004 (age 22)

Sport
- Sport: Archery
- Event: Recurve
Medal record
Men's recurve archery
Representing Spain
World Championships
Gold medal – first place	2025 Gwangju	Individual
Gold medal – first place	2025 Gwangju	Mixed team
European Championships
Silver medal – second place	2026 Antalya	Team
Bronze medal – third place	2026 Antalya	Mixed team
World Cup
Gold medal – first place	2024 Shanghai	Individual
Gold medal – first place	2026 Madrid	Mixed team
Silver medal – second place	2024 Shanghai	Mixed team
Bronze medal – third place	2024 Yecheon	Mixed team
European Games
Silver medal – second place	2023 Kraków-Małopolska	Team
Mediterranean Games
Gold medal – first place	2026 Taranto	Team
Bronze medal – third place	2026 Taranto	Individual
Bronze medal – third place	2026 Taranto	Mixed team

Andrés Temiño Mediel (born 24 February 2004) is a Spanish archer competing in men's recurve events. He won the gold medal in the mixed team recurve event at the 2025 World Archery Championships, Spain's first gold medal in the history of the World Archery Championships.

== Career ==
In June 2023, Temiño competed at the 2023 European Games and won a silver medal in the men's team event. In September 2025, he competed at the 2025 World Archery Championships and won a gold medal in the mixed team recurve event, along with Elia Canales. This was Spain's first gold medal at the World Archery Championships, and first medal since 1997. He also won a gold medal in the individual event, becoming Spain's first individual world champion.
