= Li Zhongyuan =

Chinese archer (born 2002)

Personal information
- Born: 19 August 2002 (age 24) Henan, China

Sport
- Country: China
- Sport: Archery
- Event: Recurve
- Coached by: Deng Chengcai

Li Zhongyuan (born 19 August 2002) is a Chinese archer competing in recurve events. He competed at the 2024 Paris Olympics.

== Career ==
His Chinese team reached the semi-final at the Archery World Cup stage 3 event in Antalya in June 2024, ultimately winning their bronze medal match.

He competed at the Archery at the 2024 Summer Olympics in the Men's team event. They reached the semi final with a win over Taiwan. However, consecutive defeats to South Korea in the semi final and Turkey in the bronze medal match meant they placed fourth overall.
