= Elia Canales =

Spanish archer (born 2001)

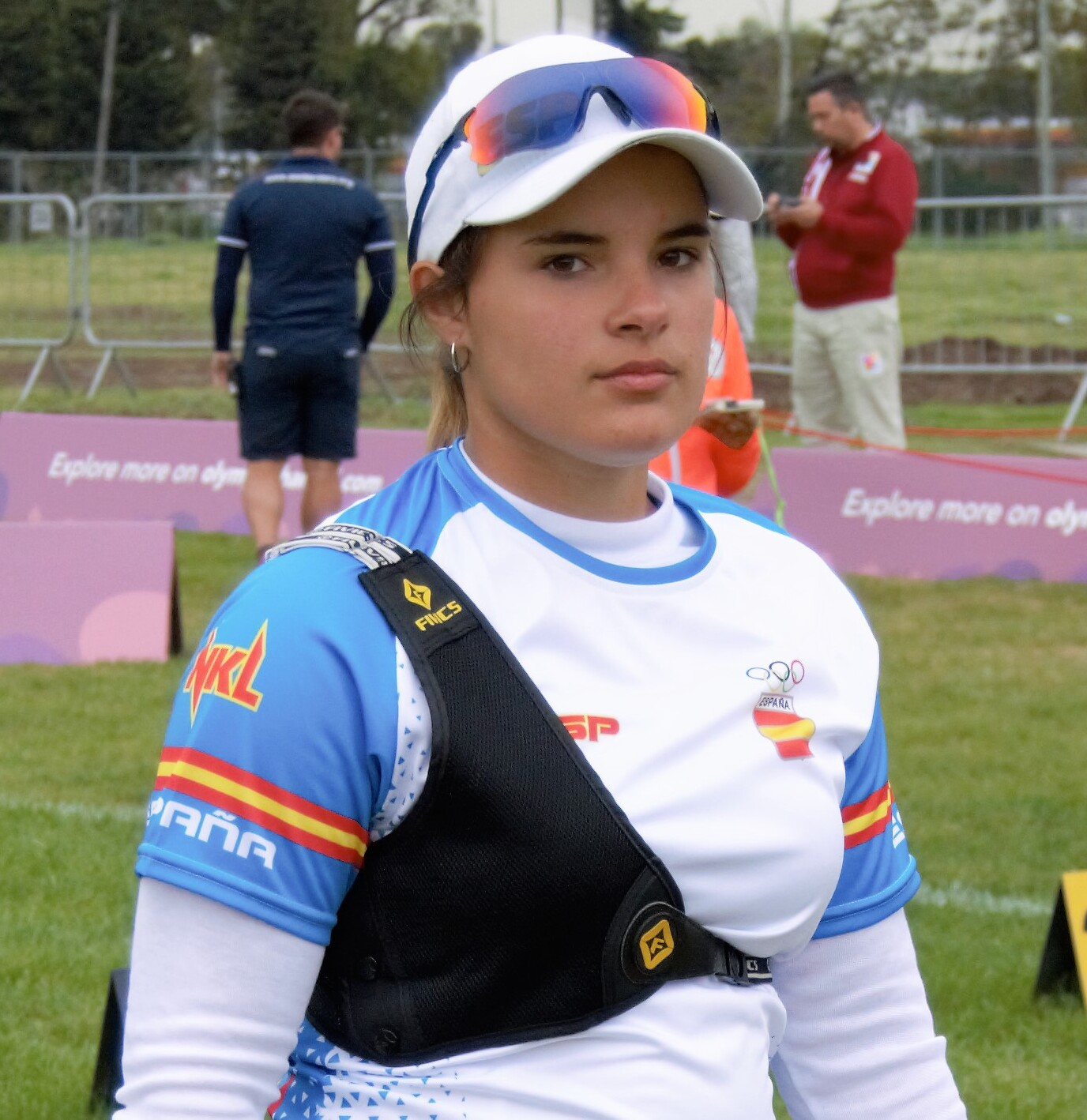
- Canales at the 2018 Summer Youth Olympics

Personal information
- Full name: Elia Canales Martín
- Born: 21 June 2001 (age 25) Tarragona, Spain

Sport
- Sport: Archery
- Event: Recurve
Medal record
Women's recurve archery
Representing Spain
World Championships
Gold medal – first place	2025 Gwangju	Mixed team
European Championships
Silver medal – second place	2021 Antalya	Mixed team
Silver medal – second place	2024 Essen	Individual
Silver medal – second place	2026 Antalya	Individual
Bronze medal – third place	2026 Antalya	Mixed team
European Games
Gold medal – first place	2023 Kraków-Małopolska	Mixed team
Silver medal – second place	2023 Kraków-Małopolska	Individual
Mediterranean Games
Silver medal – second place	2026 Taranto	Individual
Bronze medal – third place	2022 Oran	Mixed team
Bronze medal – third place	2026 Taranto	Team
Bronze medal – third place	2026 Taranto	Mixed team

Elia Canales Martín (born 25 June 2001) is a Spanish archer competing in women's recurve events. She represented Spain at the 2024 Summer Olympics. She won the gold medal in the mixed team recurve event at the 2025 World Archery Championships, Spain's first gold medal in the history of the World Archery Championships.

== Career ==
Canales made her international debut for Spain at the 2018 Summer Youth Olympics and won a silver medal in the girl's individual event.

In May 2024, she competed at the 2024 European Archery Championships and won a silver medal in the women's individual event. She then represented Spain at the 2024 Summer Olympics in both the women's individual and mixed team events.

In September 2025, she competed at the 2025 World Archery Championships and won a gold medal in the mixed team recurve event, along with Andrés Temiño. This was Spain's first gold medal at the World Archery Championships, and first medal since 1997.
