= World Archery Youth Championships =

International archery competition

The World Archery Youth Championships, an international competition in archery, have been held in alternate years since 1991 each time in a different host city. There are events in cadet and junior categories using the recurve and compound bows.

== Editions ==
- World Archery Youth Championships

| Number | Year | Location | Events |
|---|---|---|---|
| 1 | 1991 | (Norway) Sandefjord | |
| 2 | 1993 | (France) Moliets | |
| 3 | 1994 | (Italy) Roncegno | |
| 4 | 1996 | (United States) Chula Vista | |
| 5 | 1998 | (Sweden) Sunne | |
| 6 | 2000 | (France) Belfort | |
| 7 | 2002 | (Czech Republic) Nymburk | |
| 8 | 2004 | (England) Lilleshall | |
| 9 | 2006 | (Mexico) Mérida | |
| 10 | 2008 | (Turkey) Antalya | |
| 11 | 2009 | (United States) Ogden | |
| 12 | 2011 | (Poland) Legnica | |
| 13 | 2013 | (China) Wuxi | 20 |
| 14 | 2015 | (United States) Yankton | 20 |
| 15 | 2017 | (Argentina) Rosario | 20 |
| 16 | 2019 | (Spain) Madrid | 20 |
| 17 | 2021 | (Poland) Wrocław | 20 |
| 18 | 2023 | (Republic of Ireland) Limerick | 20 |
| 19 | 2025 | (Canada) Winnipeg | 20 |
| 20 | 2027 | (Turkey) Antalya | |

== Champions ==
Since 2002, two classes have been contested at the Youth World Championships:

- Junior (under 20)
- Cadet (under 17)

=== Recurve Junior ===
| Year | Location | Men's Individual | Women's Individual | Men's Team | Women's Team | Mixed Team | Ref |
|---|---|---|---|---|---|---|---|
| 1991 | (Norway) Sandefjord | Victor Wunderle (USA) | Denise Parker (USA) | Soviet Union | Italy | | |
| 1993 | (France) Moliets | Bair Badenov (RUS) | Karin Larsson (SWE) | United States | Sweden | | |
| 1994 | (Italy) Roncegno | Victor Wunderle (USA) | Kang Hyun-ji (KOR) | Italy | South Korea | | |
| 1996 | (United States) Chula Vista | Jackson Fear (AUS) | Kang Hyun-ji (KOR) | South Korea | South Korea | | |
| 1998 | (Sweden) Sunne | Oh Jin-hyek (KOR) | Kim Nam-soon (KOR) | South Korea | China | | |
| 2000 | (France) Belfort | Chung Young-soo (KOR) | Choi Ok-nam (KOR) | Germany | South Korea | | |
| 2002 | (Czech Republic) Nymburk | Anton Prylepau (BLR) | Kim Yu-mi (KOR) | South Korea | South Korea | | |
| 2004 | (England) Lilleshall | Tim Cuddihy (AUS) | Jo Eun-ji (KOR) | South Korea | South Korea | | |
| 2006 | (Mexico) Mérida | Romain Girouille (FRA) | Kim So-yun (KOR) | Germany | South Korea | | |
| 2008 | (Turkey) Antalya | Luca Melotto (ITA) | Mikie Zushi (JPN) | Australia | China | | |
| 2009 | (United States) Ogden | Sung Woo-kyeong (KOR) | Lee Yu-jin (KOR) | South Korea | South Korea | | |
| 2011 | (Poland) Legnica | Sung Woo-kyeong (KOR) | Deepika Kumari (IND) | South Korea | South Korea | South Korea | |
| 2013 | (China) Wuxi | Robin Ramaekers (BEL) | Jeon Sung-eun (KOR) | Russia | Ukraine | South Korea | |
| 2015 | (United States) Yankton | Min Byeong-yeon (KOR) | Peng Chia-mao (TPE) | South Korea | South Korea | South Korea | |
| 2017 | (Argentina) Rosario | Jeong Tae-yeong (KOR) | Kim Kyoung-eun (KOR) | South Korea | Italy | India | |
| 2019 | (Spain) Madrid | Kim Hyeon-jong (KOR) | Valentina Acosta (COL) | South Korea | South Korea | South Korea | |
| 2021 | (Poland) Wrocław | Tetsuya Aoshima (JPN) | Komalika Bari (IND) | India | Japan | India | |
| 2023 | (Republic of Ireland) Limerick | Parth Salunkhe (IND) | Oh Ye-jin (KOR) | South Korea | South Korea | South Korea | |
| 2025 | (Canada) Winnipeg | Jang Joon-ha (KOR) | Shin Seo-bhin (KOR) | United States | South Korea | South Korea | |

=== Compound Junior ===
| Year | Location | Men's Individual | Women's Individual | Men's Team | Women's Team | Mixed Team | Ref |
|---|---|---|---|---|---|---|---|
| 1994 | (Italy) Roncegno | Randall Copp (USA) | Nicole Bartlett (AUS) | Sweden | United States | | |
| 1996 | (United States) Chula Vista | Bart Winterton (USA) | Angela Moscarelli (USA) | Australia | United States | | |
| 1998 | (Sweden) Sunne | Adam Wheatcroft (USA) | Ashley Kamuf (USA) | United States | France | | |
| 2000 | (France) Belfort | Adam Wheatcroft (USA) | Amber Dawson (USA) | United States | United States | | |
| 2002 | (Czech Republic) Nymburk | Florian Faucheur (FRA) | Camilla Sømod (DEN) | Sweden | United States | | |
| 2004 | (England) Lilleshall | Braden Gellenthien (USA) | Tiffany Reeves (USA) | Canada | United States | | |
| 2006 | (Mexico) Mérida | Palton Hansda (IND) | Doris Jones (CAN) | United States | United States | | |
| 2008 | (Turkey) Antalya | Mads Juul Krogshede (DEN) | Kendal Nicely (USA) | Russia | United States | | |
| 2009 | (United States) Ogden | Cody Thompson (USA) | Inge van Caspel (NED) | United States | United States | | |
| 2011 | (Poland) Legnica | Colann Schreuders (NED) | Kendal Nicely (USA) | Canada | Mexico | Netherlands | |
| 2013 | (China) Wuxi | Stephan Hansen (DEN) | Sara López (COL) | Mexico | United States | Colombia | |
| 2015 | (United States) Yankton | Stephan Hansen (DEN) | Tanja Jensen (DEN) | Turkey | United States | Colombia | |
| 2017 | (Argentina) Rosario | Curtis Broadnax (USA) | Alexis Ruiz (USA) | Mexico | Mexico | Great Britain | |
| 2019 | (Spain) Madrid | Anders Faugstad (NOR) | Amanda Mlinarić (CRO) | United States | United States | India | |
| 2021 | (Poland) Wrocław | Robin Jäätma (EST) | Amanda Mlinarić (CRO) | Mexico | Mexico | Estonia | |
| 2023 | (Republic of Ireland) Limerick | Priyansh (IND) | Sydney Sullenberger (USA) | Denmark | India | India | |
| 2025 | (Canada) Winnipeg | Ruven Flüß (GER) | Chikitha Taniparthi (IND) | India | Turkey | Mexico | |

=== Recurve Cadet ===
| Year | Location | Men's Individual | Women's Individual | Men's Team | Women's Team | Mixed Team | Ref |
|---|---|---|---|---|---|---|---|
| 2002 | (Czech Republic) Nymburk | Tim Cuddihy (AUS) | Karina Lipiarska (POL) | Australia | Italy | | |
| 2004 | (England) Lilleshall | Chen Wenyuan (CHN) | Carla Frangilli (ITA) | Germany | China | | |
| 2006 | (Mexico) Mérida | Ryan Tyack (AUS) | Jane Waller (AUS) | Turkey | Ukraine | | |
| 2008 | (Turkey) Antalya | Kim Hyun (KOR) | Tatiana Segina (RUS) | South Korea | South Korea | | |
| 2009 | (United States) Ogden | Kim Joo-wan (KOR) | Deepika Kumari (IND) | South Korea | South Korea | | |
| 2011 | (Poland) Legnica | Park Seong-jeol (KOR) | Ryoo Su-jung (KOR) | Chinese Taipei | South Korea | South Korea | |
| 2013 | (China) Wuxi | Patrick Huston (GBR) | Jeong Yu-ri (KOR) | France | France | Great Britain | |
| 2015 | (United States) Yankton | Marcus Vinicius D'Almeida (BRA) | Hyeong Yea-jin (KOR) | South Korea | South Korea | South Korea | |
| 2017 | (Argentina) Rosario | Tang Chih-chun (TPE) | Park So-hui (KOR) | United States | Japan | Chinese Taipei | |
| 2019 | (Spain) Madrid | Tai Yu-hsuan (TPE) | Komalika Bari (IND) | South Korea | South Korea | South Korea | |
| 2021 | (Poland) Wrocław | Iban Bariteaud (FRA) | Caroline Lopez (FRA) | India | France | India | |
| 2023 | (Republic of Ireland) Limerick | Romans Sergejevs (LAT) | Yun Soo-hee (KOR) | France | South Korea | Japan | |
| 2025 | (Canada) Winnipeg | Alex Sillitoe Price (GBR) | Sharvari Somnath Shende (IND) | South Korea | South Korea | South Korea | |

=== Compound Cadet ===
| Year | Location | Men's Individual | Women's Individual | Men's Team | Women's Team | Mixed Team | Ref |
|---|---|---|---|---|---|---|---|
| 2002 | (Czech Republic) Nymburk | Thomas Nealy (USA) | Erika Anschutz (USA) | United States | not held | not held | |
| 2004 | (England) Lilleshall | Ryan Day (USA) | Antoinette Heijkers (NED) | United States | not held | not held | |
| 2006 | (Mexico) Mérida | Paris Goico de Lara (DOM) | Anastasia Anastasio (ITA) | United States | United States | not held | |
| 2008 | (Turkey) Antalya | Joey Hunt III (USA) | Kailey Johnston (USA) | United States | United States | not held | |
| 2009 | (United States) Ogden | Alexander Sahi (USA) | Paige Pearce (USA) | Mexico | United States | not held | |
| 2011 | (Poland) Legnica | Stephan Hansen (DEN) | Emily Fischer (USA) | United States | United States | United States | |
| 2013 | (China) Wuxi | Domagoj Buden (CRO) | Alexandra Savenkova (RUS) | Turkey | United States | Russia | |
| 2015 | (United States) Yankton | Viktor Orosz (HUN) | Fatimah Almashhadani (IRQ) | United States | United States | Mexico | |
| 2017 | (Argentina) Rosario | Bryan Alvarado Fernandez (PUR) | Lucy Mason (GBR) | United States | Mexico | Turkey | |
| 2019 | (Spain) Madrid | Sebastian Garcia (MEX) | Arina Cherkezova (RUS) | United States | United States | Mexico | |
| 2021 | (Poland) Wrocław | Aljaz Matija Brenk (SLO) | Selene Rodríguez (MEX) | India | India | India | |
| 2023 | (Republic of Ireland) Limerick | Dewey Hathaway (USA) | Aditi Gopichand Swami (IND) | Mexico | India | United States | |
| 2025 | (Canada) Winnipeg | Moritz Simon (GER) | Savannah O'Donohue (USA) | India | United States | United States | |
