= Archery at the 2023 Pan American Games =

- Archery pictogram
- Venue: Archery Center
- Start date: November 1, 2023
- End date: November 5, 2023
- No. of events: 10 (4 men, 4 women, 2 mixed)
- Competitors: 98 from 17 nations

Archery competitions at the 2023 Pan American Games in Santiago, Chile were held between November 1 and 5, 2023 at the Archery Center in Peñalolén.

The highest ranked athlete in each individual recurve event (that had not yet qualified) earned a quota spot for their country at the 2024 Summer Olympics in Paris, France along with the top mixed recurve team.

== Qualification ==
A total of 98 archers qualified to compete at the games (49 per gender). A country could enter a maximum of ten archers (five per gender). As host nation, Chile qualified eight athletes automatically (3 for the men’s and women's recurve event each, 1 for the men’s and women’s compound event each). Four qualification tournaments were used to determine the 66 qualifiers in recurve and 32 in compound.

== Participating nations ==
A total of 17 countries qualified archers.

- Argentina (3)
- Brazil (9)
- Canada (8)
- Chile (8)
- Colombia (10)
- Cuba (6)
- Dominican Republic (1)
- Ecuador (1)
- El Salvador (6)
- Guyana (1)
- Independent Athletes Team (7)
- Mexico (12)
- Peru (3)
- Puerto Rico (4)
- United States (11)
- Venezuela (4)
- Virgin Islands (2)

== Medal summary ==
=== Medal table ===
* Host nation (Chile)

Rank	NOC's	Gold	Silver	Bronze	Total
1	United States	5	4	1	10
2	Mexico	2	3	3	8
3	Colombia	1	1	4	6
4	El Salvador	1	0	0	1
4	Puerto Rico	1	0	0	1
6	Brazil	0	2	1	3
7	Chile*	0	0	1	1
Totals (7 entries)		10	10	10	30

=== Medalists ===
Recurve

Event	Gold	Silver	Bronze
Men's individual	United States; Jackson Mirich	Mexico; Matías Grande	Chile; Ricardo Soto
Men's team	United States; Brady Ellison; Jackson Mirich; Jack Williams	Mexico; Carlos Rojas; Matías Grande; Caleb Urbina	Brazil; Marcus Vinicius D'Almeida; Matheus Gomes; Matheus Ely
Women's individual	Mexico; Alejandra Valencia	Brazil; Ana Clara Machado	United States; Casey Kaufhold
Women's team	United States; Catalina GNoriega; Jennifer Mucino-Fernandez; Casey Kaufhold	Mexico; Aída Román; Ángela Ruiz; Alejandra Valencia	Colombia; Ana Rendón; Maira Sepúlveda; Carolina Posada
Mixed team	United States; Casey Kaufhold; Brady Ellison	Brazil; Ana Clara Machado; Marcus Vinicius D'Almeida	Mexico; Alejandra Valencia; Matías Grande

Compound

Event	Gold	Silver	Bronze
Men's individual	Jean Pizarro; Puerto Rico	Sawyer Sullivan; United States	Jagdeep Singh; Colombia
Men's team	El Salvador; Roberto Hernández; Douglas Nolasco	United States; Kris Schaff; Sawyer Sullivan	Colombia; Sebastián Arenas; Jagdeep Singh
Women's individual	Dafne Quintero; Mexico	Alexis Ruiz; United States	Alejandra Usquiano; Colombia
Women's team	United States; Olivia Dean; Alexis Ruiz	Colombia; Sara López; Alejandra Usquiano	Mexico; Andrea Becerra; Dafne Quintero
Mixed team	Colombia; Sara López; Jagdeep Singh	United States; Kris Schaff; Alexis Ruiz	Mexico; Sebastián García; Dafne Quintero

== See also ==
- Archery at the 2023 Parapan American Games
- Archery at the 2024 Summer Olympics
