= Bruce Arnold (archer) =

American educator and athlete

Personal information
- Full name: Bruce Makoto Arnold
- Born: Kettering, Ohio
- Height: 183 cm (6 ft 0 in)
- Weight: 84 kg (185 lb)

Sport
- Country: United States of America, United States Virgin Islands
- Sport: Archery
- Event: Recurve
- College team: University of Tulsa
Medal record
Men's archery
States Games of America
Representing United States Virgin Islands
Gold medal – first place	2019 Lynchburg	Individual
Pan American Masters Championships
Representing United States Virgin Islands
Bronze medal – third place	2022 Halifax	Mixed Team
Silver medal – second place	2024 San Salvador	Mixed Team
Bronze medal – third place	2026 Medellin	Mixed Team
Caribbean Championships
Representing United States Virgin Islands
Gold medal – first place	2026 Georgetown	Mixed Team

Bruce Makoto Arnold is a retired historian and current archer who competes for the United States Virgin Islands. At the 2024 Youth & Masters Pan Am Championships in San Salvador, he and fellow Virgin Islander, Tatyana Muntyan, set a world record in mixed-team qualifications with a score of 1228 and were the first to set a world record in archery from that country.

== Archery ==
In 1998, Arnold was an NAA All-American archer at the University of Tulsa, the first All American in archery from that university.

== Academics ==
Arnold earned degrees in computer science from Salt Lake Community College, the University of Nevada, Reno, and the University of Tulsa. After these, he earned a bachelor's degree in East Asian Studies from the University of Arizona, a master's degree in East Asian History from the University of Wisconsin, Madison, a master's degree in United States history from Sam Houston State University, and a bachelor's degree in philosophy from Charter Oak Stare College. He then earned his PhD at Louisiana State University in 2014, and worked as a historian and then as assistant professor of history at Ohio State University before retiring.

== Personal life ==
Arnold is married to Ohio State educator Noelle W. Arnold.

== Publications ==
- Bruce Makoto Arnold, Roland W. Mitchell, and Noelle W. Arnold, "Massified Illusions of Difference:Photography and the Mystique of the American Historically Black Colleges and Universities (HBCUs)", in Journal of American Studies of Turkey, 41 (2015): 69–94.
