= Pan American Archery Championships =

The Pan American Archery Championships is an outdoor archery sports championships gathering nations from North America, Central America, South America and the Caribbean.

== Outdoor Championships ==
=== Senior ===
Edition	Host city	Host country
1972 Pan American Archery Championships	Acapulco	Mexico
1974 Pan American Archery Championships	San Juan	Puerto Rico
1976 Pan American Archery Championships	Valley Forge	United States
1980 Pan American Archery Championships	Melgar	Colombia
1982 Pan American Archery Championships	Joliette	Canada
1986 Pan American Archery Championships	Rio de Janeiro	Brazil
1994 Pan American Archery Championships	Sancti Spíritus	Cuba
1998 Pan American Archery Championships	Havana	Cuba
2000 Pan American Archery Championships	Medellín	Colombia
2002 Pan American Archery Championships	San Salvador	El Salvador
2004 Pan American Archery Championships	Valencia	Venezuela
2006 Pan American Archery Championships	Rio de Janeiro	Brazil
2008 Pan American Archery Championships	Valencia	Venezuela
2010 Pan American Archery Championships	Guadalajara	Mexico
2012 Pan American Archery Championships	San Salvador	El Salvador
2014 Pan American Archery Championships	Rosario	Argentina
2016 Pan American Archery Championships	San José	Costa Rica
2018 Pan American Archery Championships	Medellín	Colombia
2021 Pan American Archery Championships	Monterrey	Mexico
2022 Pan American Archery Championships	Santiago	Chile
2023 Pan American Archery Championships	Puerto Iguazú	Argentina
2024 Pan American Archery Championships	Medellín	Colombia
2025 Pan American Archery Championships	San Cristóbal de las Casas	Mexico
2026 Pan American Archery Championships	Tlaxcala	Mexico

=== Youth and Masters ===
Edition	Host city	Host country
2022 Pan American Youth and Masters Archery Championships	Halifax	Canada
2024 Pan American Youth and Masters Archery Championships	San Salvador	El Salvador
2026 Pan American Youth and Masters Archery Championships	Medellín	Colombia
