= 2024 European Archery Championships – Women's individual recurve =

Archery competition

Women's Individual Recurve at the 2024 European Archery Championships
- Location: Essen, Germany
- Dates: 7–12 May
- Competitors: 81 from 31 nations

Medalists
| gold medal | Katharina Bauer | Germany |
| silver medal | Elia Canales | Spain |
| bronze medal | Lisa Barbelin | France |

2024 European Archery Championships
| Men | Recurve | Compound |
| Women | Recurve | Compound |
| Team | Men's recurve | Men's compound |
| Team | Women's recurve | Women's compound |
| Mixed team | Recurve | Compound |

The women's individual recurve competition at the 2024 European Archery Championships took place from 7 to 12 May in Essen, Germany.

== Qualification round ==
Results after 72 arrows.

| Rank | Name | Nation | Score | 10+X | X |
|---|---|---|---|---|---|
| 1 | Katharina Bauer | Germany | 680 | 37 | 11 |
| 2 | Chiara Rebagliati | Italy | 672 | 33 | 6 |
| 3 | Tatiana Andreoli | Italy | 671 | 36 | 11 |
| 4 | Caroline Lopez | France | 669 | 31 | 7 |
| 5 | Quinty Roeffen | Netherlands | 667 | 29 | 11 |
| 6 | Charline Schwarz | Germany | 666 | 32 | 9 |
| 7 | Elia Canales | Spain | 665 | 25 | 9 |
| 8 | Bryony Pitman | Great Britain | 664 | 31 | 10 |
| 9 | Alexandra Mîrca | Moldova | 663 | 30 | 11 |
| 10 | Žana Pintarič | Slovenia | 660 | 32 | 12 |
| 11 | Veronika Marchenko | Ukraine | 660 | 29 | 7 |
| 12 | Lisa Barbelin | France | 660 | 25 | 9 |
| 13 | Fatma Maraşlı | Turkey | 660 | 25 | 7 |
| 14 | Randi Degn | Denmark | 659 | 24 | 11 |
| 15 | Elisa Tartler | Germany | 658 | 27 | 12 |
| 16 | Reena Pärnat | Estonia | 658 | 23 | 8 |
| 17 | Urška Čavič | Slovenia | 657 | 30 | 10 |
| 18 | Irati Altuna | Spain | 657 | 25 | 12 |
| 19 | Lucilla Boari | Italy | 656 | 27 | 7 |
| 20 | Evangelia Psarra | Greece | 654 | 23 | 6 |
| 21 | Elisabeth Straka | Austria | 654 | 22 | 3 |
| 22 | Marie Horáčková | Czech Republic | 653 | 28 | 11 |
| 23 | Gabriela Schloesser | Netherlands | 653 | 27 | 5 |
| 24 | Olivia Diogo | Switzerland | 653 | 21 | 9 |
| 25 | Dimitra Papadopoulou | Greece | 653 | 19 | 5 |
| 26 | Amélie Cordeau | France | 652 | 25 | 11 |
| 27 | Denisa Baránková | Slovakia | 651 | 24 | 4 |
| 28 | Laura van der Winkel | Netherlands | 651 | 23 | 10 |
| 29 | Megan Havers | Great Britain | 650 | 22 | 6 |
| 30 | Christine Bjerendal | Sweden | 650 | 21 | 8 |
| 31 | Penny Healey | Great Britain | 649 | 23 | 2 |
| 32 | Giorgia Cesarini | San Marino | 649 | 22 | 6 |
| 33 | Olha Chebotarenko | Ukraine | 649 | 19 | 8 |
| 34 | Olena Kushniruk | Belgium | 648 | 24 | 8 |
| 35 | Dünya Yenihayat | Turkey | 647 | 29 | 11 |
| 36 | Anastasia Pavlova | Ukraine | 646 | 18 | 7 |
| 37 | Medea Gvinchidze | Georgia | 644 | 19 | 9 |
| 38 | Nanna Jakobsen | Denmark | 644 | 19 | 5 |
| 39 | Salome Kharshiladze | Georgia | 643 | 25 | 8 |
| 40 | Elif Gökkır | Turkey | 643 | 20 | 7 |
| 41 | Inés de Velasco | Spain | 642 | 22 | 6 |
| 42 | Mikaella Moshe | Israel | 639 | 22 | 6 |
| 43 | Anatoli Martha Gkorila | Greece | 637 | 15 | 3 |
| 44 | Tinkara Kardinar | Slovenia | 636 | 19 | 8 |
| 45 | Yaylagul Ramazanova | Azerbaijan | 636 | 18 | 6 |
| 46 | Julie Hellemans | Belgium | 635 | 23 | 9 |
| 47 | Triinu Lilienthal | Estonia | 635 | 23 | 9 |
| 48 | Jindřiška Vaněčková | Czech Republic | 633 | 18 | 8 |
| 49 | Laura Amato | Switzerland | 633 | 15 | 4 |
| 50 | Charlotte Destrooper | Belgium | 632 | 18 | 8 |
| 51 | Elena Bendíková | Slovakia | 632 | 16 | 6 |
| 52 | Klaudia Płaza | Poland | 631 | 19 | 5 |
| 53 | Dobromira Danailova | Bulgaria | 630 | 17 | 5 |
| 54 | Mădălina Amăistroaie | Romania | 630 | 13 | 4 |
| 55 | Shelley Hilton | Israel | 629 | 15 | 6 |
| 56 | Martyna Stach | Poland | 628 | 15 | 10 |
| 57 | Rowanna Hanlon | Ireland | 625 | 13 | 2 |
| 58 | Roisin Mooney | Ireland | 624 | 18 | 4 |
| 59 | Teona Kutaladze | Georgia | 623 | 21 | 5 |
| 60 | Wioleta Myszor | Poland | 623 | 17 | 5 |
| 61 | Liliana Licari | Switzerland | 623 | 17 | 3 |
| 62 | Erika Jangnäs | Sweden | 614 | 12 | 4 |
| 63 | Kristína Drusková | Slovakia | 613 | 18 | 5 |
| 64 | Milana Tkachenko | Portugal | 613 | 13 | 5 |
| 65 | Nikola Lettlová | Czech Republic | 612 | 10 | 2 |
| 66 | Emma Louise Davis | Ireland | 610 | 12 | 2 |
| 67 | Paulina Ramanauskaitė | Lithuania | 607 | 9 | 2 |
| 68 | Kristina Pruccoli | San Marino | 606 | 12 | 2 |
| 69 | Fatima Huseynli | Azerbaijan | 599 | 13 | 6 |
| 70 | Kasandra Berzan | Moldova | 598 | 13 | 3 |
| 71 | Bessi Kasak | Estonia | 597 | 11 | 6 |
| 72 | Shira Ifergan | Israel | 594 | 7 | 2 |
| 73 | Kirstine Andersen | Denmark | 581 | 15 | 2 |
| 74 | Iida Tukiainen | Finland | 581 | 7 | 2 |
| 75 | Marín Aníta Hilmarsdóttir | Iceland | 577 | 12 | 4 |
| 76 | Svetlana Sminova | Azerbaijan | 572 | 9 | 2 |
| 77 | Nicoleta Clima | Moldova | 572 | 6 | 0 |
| 78 | Taru Kuoppa | Finland | 571 | 10 | 6 |
| 79 | Gejane Bottinelli | Finland | 561 | 8 | 1 |
| 80 | Valgerður Einarsdóttir Hjaltested | Iceland | 551 | 10 | 1 |
| 81 | Astrid Daxböck | Iceland | 470 | 2 | 0 |

== Final round ==
Quarterfinals
1 | (Germany) Katharina Bauer | 6 | 28 | 29 | 27 | 23 | 28
24 | (Switzerland) Olivia Diogo | 4 | 29 | 25 | 25 | 29 | 27
12 | (France) Lisa Barbelin | 6 | 28 | 29 | 27 | 27
29 | (United Kingdom) Megan Havers | 2 | 27 | 28 | 29 | 26
3 | (Italy) Tatiana Andreoli | 6 | 27 | 30 | 27 | 29
6 | (Germany) Charline Schwarz | 2 | 26 | 28 | 28 | 28
7 | (Spain) Elia Canales | 6 | 28 | 26 | 27 | 29
18 | (Spain) Irati Altuna | 2 | 27 | 29 | 26 | 27

Semifinals
1 | (Germany) Katharina Bauer | 6 | 28 | 29 | 27 | 23 | 28
12 | (France) Lisa Barbelin | 4 | 29 | 25 | 25 | 29 | 27
3 | (Italy) Tatiana Andreoli | 0 | 25 | 27 | 27
7 | (Spain) Elia Canales | 6 | 27 | 30 | 28

Finals
1 | (Germany) Katharina Bauer | 6^{9+} | 26 | 27 | 27 | 27 | 29
7 | (Spain) Elia Canales | 5^{9} | 27 | 27 | 25 | 25 | 30
Third place
12 | (France) Lisa Barbelin | 6 | 27 | 27 | 28
3 | (Italy) Tatiana Andreoli | 0 | 23 | 25 | 27
