= 2024 European Archery Championships – Men's individual recurve =

Archery competition

Men's individual recurve at the 2024 European Archery Championships
- Location: Essen, Germany
- Dates: 7–12 May
- Competitors: 91 from 34 nations

Medalists
| gold medal | Mete Gazoz | Turkey |
| silver medal | Den Habjan Malavašič | Slovenia |
| bronze medal | Jean-Charles Valladont | France |

2024 European Archery Championships
| Men | Recurve | Compound |
| Women | Recurve | Compound |
| Team | Men's recurve | Men's compound |
| Team | Women's recurve | Women's compound |
| Mixed team | Recurve | Compound |

The men's individual recurve competition at the 2024 European Archery Championships will take place from 7 to 12 May in Essen, Germany.

== Qualification round ==
Results after 72 arrows.

| Rank | Name | Nation | Score | 10+X | X |
|---|---|---|---|---|---|
| 1 | Thomas Chirault | France | 692 | 45 | 16 |
| 2 | Mete Gazoz | Turkey | 689 | 45 | 15 |
| 3 | Baptiste Addis | France | 689 | 45 | 15 |
| 4 | Andrés Temiño | Spain | 686 | 40 | 12 |
| 5 | Mykhailo Usach | Ukraine | 684 | 42 | 15 |
| 6 | Mauro Nespoli | Italy | 684 | 38 | 14 |
| 7 | Senna Roos | Netherlands | 680 | 42 | 14 |
| 8 | Florian Unruh | Germany | 679 | 37 | 15 |
| 9 | Moritz Wieser | Germany | 677 | 38 | 12 |
| 10 | Gijs Broeksma | Netherlands | 677 | 35 | 10 |
| 11 | Federico Musolesi | Italy | 676 | 35 | 15 |
| 12 | Oskar Kasprowski | Poland | 676 | 33 | 10 |
| 13 | Théo Carbonetti | Belgium | 676 | 32 | 12 |
| 14 | Kéziah Chabin | Switzerland | 675 | 38 | 12 |
| 15 | Steve Wijler | Netherlands | 673 | 33 | 12 |
| 16 | Mátyás Balogh | Hungary | 672 | 37 | 7 |
| 17 | Jean-Charles Valladont | France | 672 | 32 | 15 |
| 18 | Berkay Akkoyun | Turkey | 671 | 38 | 14 |
| 19 | Roy Dror | Israel | 671 | 33 | 11 |
| 20 | Alessandro Paoli | Italy | 669 | 31 | 10 |
| 21 | Oliver Staudt | Denmark | 668 | 31 | 10 |
| 22 | Aleksandre Machavariani | Georgia | 668 | 31 | 8 |
| 23 | Dan Olaru | Moldova | 668 | 30 | 10 |
| 24 | Richard Krejčí | Czech Republic | 668 | 30 | 6 |
| 25 | Berkim Tümer | Turkey | 668 | 29 | 11 |
| 26 | Ivan Banchev | Bulgaria | 667 | 32 | 8 |
| 27 | Žiga Ravnikar | Slovenia | 667 | 31 | 8 |
| 28 | Pablo Acha | Spain | 667 | 30 | 10 |
| 29 | Conor Hall | Great Britain | 666 | 31 | 6 |
| 30 | Artem Ovchynnikov | Ukraine | 666 | 29 | 12 |
| 31 | Antti Tekoniemi | Finland | 666 | 29 | 11 |
| 32 | Mathias Kramer | Germany | 664 | 25 | 10 |
| 33 | Alex Wise | Great Britain | 663 | 31 | 13 |
| 34 | Pit Klein | Luxembourg | 663 | 30 | 8 |
| 35 | Lovro Černi | Croatia | 662 | 29 | 12 |
| 36 | Den Habjan Malavašič | Slovenia | 662 | 25 | 13 |
| 37 | Ken Sánchez | Spain | 661 | 31 | 12 |
| 38 | Nuno Carneiro | Portugal | 660 | 30 | 12 |
| 39 | Carl McCaffrey | Ireland | 660 | 28 | 8 |
| 40 | Oleksii Hunbin | Ukraine | 660 | 27 | 10 |
| 41 | Mahammadali Aliyev | Azerbaijan | 659 | 27 | 10 |
| 42 | Florian Faber | Switzerland | 658 | 28 | 6 |
| 43 | Hamlet Poghosyan | Armenia | 657 | 24 | 6 |
| 44 | Konrad Kupczak | Poland | 656 | 27 | 9 |
| 45 | Itay Shanny | Israel | 656 | 25 | 11 |
| 46 | Jeff Henckels | Luxembourg | 656 | 24 | 7 |
| 47 | Jacob Mosén | Sweden | 655 | 28 | 11 |
| 48 | Romans Sergejevs | Latvia | 654 | 30 | 3 |
| 49 | Félix Möckli | Switzerland | 654 | 27 | 7 |
| 50 | Christian Zwetti | Austria | 654 | 26 | 12 |
| 51 | Martin Rist | Estonia | 654 | 24 | 10 |
| 52 | Lukas Kurz | Austria | 653 | 26 | 9 |
| 53 | Niv Frenkel | Israel | 653 | 23 | 8 |
| 54 | Kaj Sjöberg | Sweden | 653 | 23 | 6 |
| 55 | Alen Remar | Croatia | 652 | 19 | 5 |
| 56 | Daniel Medveczky | Slovakia | 651 | 28 | 8 |
| 57 | Andrey Hovhannisyan | Armenia | 651 | 22 | 7 |
| 58 | Ludvig Njor Henriksen | Denmark | 650 | 22 | 6 |
| 59 | Juraj Duchoň | Slovakia | 649 | 25 | 5 |
| 60 | Tom Hall | Great Britain | 649 | 18 | 8 |
| 61 | Leo Sulik | Croatia | 648 | 25 | 7 |
| 62 | Vasil Shahnazaryan | Armenia | 646 | 22 | 9 |
| 63 | David Macher | Austria | 645 | 18 | 8 |
| 64 | Mario Țîmpu | Romania | 644 | 17 | 5 |
| 65 | Temur Makievi | Georgia | 642 | 20 | 5 |
| 66 | Nectarios Condurache | Romania | 641 | 20 | 9 |
| 67 | Eli Bæk | Denmark | 639 | 23 | 6 |
| 68 | Dāvis Blāze | Latvia | 639 | 19 | 6 |
| 69 | Dalius Mačernius | Lithuania | 637 | 20 | 7 |
| 70 | Maksymilian Osuch | Poland | 636 | 25 | 4 |
| 71 | Anri Basiladze | Georgia | 636 | 19 | 5 |
| 72 | Adam Li | Czech Republic | 636 | 18 | 7 |
| 73 | Panagiotis Themelis | Greece | 636 | 17 | 4 |
| 74 | Jarno De Smedt | Belgium | 635 | 17 | 6 |
| 75 | Oskar Ronan | Ireland | 634 | 17 | 3 |
| 76 | Josef Křesala | Czech Republic | 634 | 15 | 4 |
| 77 | Luís Gonçalves | Portugal | 631 | 19 | 3 |
| 78 | Miha Rožič | Slovenia | 630 | 23 | 5 |
| 79 | Miroslav Duchoň | Slovakia | 629 | 18 | 3 |
| 80 | Arkadios Damopoulos | Greece | 627 | 15 | 3 |
| 81 | Tamaș Moreh | Romania | 625 | 14 | 5 |
| 82 | Roman Vengerov | Azerbaijan | 624 | 15 | 6 |
| 83 | Kevin Hedenvang | Sweden | 621 | 21 | 7 |
| 84 | Arne Collas | Belgium | 621 | 19 | 5 |
| 85 | Sampo Ronkanen | Finland | 615 | 20 | 4 |
| 86 | Jérôme Ansel | Luxembourg | 615 | 14 | 5 |
| 87 | Charalampos Iakovidis | Greece | 615 | 11 | 3 |
| 88 | Modestas Šliauteris | Lithuania | 610 | 9 | 2 |
| 89 | Dilans Gods-Romanovskis | Latvia | 609 | 13 | 7 |
| 90 | Domantas Šuliokas | Lithuania | 602 | 10 | 2 |
| 91 | Alexander Meyer | Ireland | 557 | 5 | 1 |

== Final round ==
Quarterfinals
17 | (France) Jean-Charles Valladont | 6 | 30 | 29 | 29
40 | (Ukraine) Oleksii Hunbin | 0 | 25 | 27 | 27
37 | (Spain) Ken Sánchez | 5^{8} | 29 | 25 | 27 | 30 | 28
36 | (Slovenia) Den Habjan Malavašič | 6^{10} | 27 | 26 | 30 | 28 | 28
3 | (France) Baptiste Addis | 6 | 29 | 28 | 28 | 28 | 27
11 | (Italy) Federico Musolesi | 4 | 28 | 26 | 29 | 28 | 27
10 | (Netherlands) Gijs Broeksma | 0 | 29 | 25 | 26
2 | (Turkey) Mete Gazoz | 6 | 30 | 30 | 27

Semifinals
17 | (France) Jean-Charles Valladont | 2 | 28 | 29 | 26 | 27
36 | (Slovenia) Den Habjan Malavašič | 6 | 28 | 30 | 26 | 28
3 | (France) Baptiste Addis | 1 | 26 | 29 | 28 | 27
2 | (Turkey) Mete Gazoz | 7 | 30 | 30 | 28 | 30

Finals
36 | (Slovenia) Den Habjan Malavašič | 0 | 25 | 25 | 28
2 | (Turkey) Mete Gazoz | 6 | 29 | 26 | 30
Third place
17 | (France) Jean-Charles Valladont | 6 | 28 | 28 | 28
3 | (France) Baptiste Addis | 0 | 27 | 27 | 26
