= 2024 European Archery Championships – Women's team recurve =

Archery competition

Women's team recurve at the 2024 European Archery Championships
- Location: Essen, Germany
- Dates: 7–12 May
- Competitors: 72 from 24 nations
- Teams: 24

Medalists
gold medal	Lisa Barbelin; Amélie Cordeau; Caroline Lopez	France
silver medal	Quinty Roeffen; Gabriela Schloesser; Laura van der Winkel	Netherlands
bronze medal	Katharina Bauer; Charline Schwarz; Elisa Tartler	Germany

2024 European Archery Championships
Men	Recurve	Compound
Women	Recurve	Compound
Team	Men's recurve	Men's compound
Team	Women's recurve	Women's compound
Mixed team	Recurve	Compound

The women's team recurve competition at the 2024 European Archery Championships took place from 7 to 12 May in Essen, Germany.

== Qualification round ==
Results after 216 arrows.

Rank	Nation	Name	Score	10+X	X
1	Germany	Katharina Bauer; Charline Schwarz; Elisa Tartler	2004	96	32
2	Italy	Chiara Rebagliati; Tatiana Andreoli; Lucilla Boari	1999	96	24
3	France	Lisa Barbelin; Amélie Cordeau; Caroline Lopez	1981	81	27
4	Netherlands	Quinty Roeffen; Gabriela Schloesser; Laura van der Winkel	1971	79	26
5	Spain	Elia Canales; Irati Altuna; Inés de Velasco	1964	72	27
6	United Kingdom	Bryony Pitman; Megan Havers; Penny Healey	1963	76	18
7	Ukraine	Veronika Marchenko; Olha Chebotarenko; Anastasia Pavlova	1955	66	22
8	Slovenia	Žana Pintarič; Urška Čavič; Tinkara Kardinar	1953	81	30
9	Turkey	Fatma Maraşlı; Dünya Yenihayat; Elif Gökkır	1950	74	25
10	Greece	Evangelia Psarra; Dimitra Papadopoulou; Anatoli Martha Gkorila	1944	57	14
11	Belgium	Olena Kushniruk; Julie Hellemans; Charlotte Destrooper	1915	65	25
12	Georgia	Medea Gvinchidze; Salome Kharshiladze; Teona Kutaladze	1910	65	22
13	Switzerland	Olivia Diogo; Laura Amato; Liliana Licari	1909	53	16
14	Czech Republic	Marie Horáčková; Jindřiška Vaněčková; Nikola Lettlova	1898	56	21
15	Slovakia	Denisa Baránková; Elena Bendíková; Kristína Drusková	1896	58	15
16	Estonia	Reena Pärnat; Triinu Lilienthal; Bessi Kasak	1890	57	23
17	Denmark	Randi Degn; Nanna Jakobsen; Kirstine Andersen	1884	58	18
18	Poland	Klaudia Plaza; Martyna Stach; Wioleta Myszor	1882	51	20
19	Israel	Mikaella Moshe; Shelley Hilton; Shira Ifergan	1862	44	14
20	Ireland	Rowanna Hanlon; Roisin Mooney; Emma Louise Davis	1859	43	8
21	Moldova	Alexandra Mîrca; Kasandra Berzan; Nicoleta Clima	1833	49	14
22	Azerbaijan	Yaylagul Ramazanova; Fatima Huseynli; Svetlana Sminova	1807	40	14
23	Finland	Iida Tukiainen; Taru Kuoppa; Gejane Bottinelli	1713	25	9
24	Iceland	Marín Aníta Hilmarsdóttir; Valgerður Einarsdóttir Hjaltested; Astrid Daxböck	1598	24	5

== Final round ==
Semifinals
1	Germany	0	53	54	51
4	Netherlands	6	57	57	53
3	France	5	56	55	55
2	Italy	1	54	55	53

Finals
4	Netherlands	3	55	51	51	50
3	France	5	55	50	52	52
Third place
1	Germany	6	52	54	55	54
2	Italy	2	55	53	53	52

== Elimination round ==
=== Section 1 ===
1/12 finals
1	Germany
Bye
17	Denmark	6	55	52	54	53
16	Estonia	2	51	53	51	50
9	Turkey	6	55	57	55
24	Iceland	0	42	49	43
Bye
8	Slovenia
5	Spain
Bye
21	Moldova	1	52	54	53
12	Georgia	5	58	55	53
13	Switzerland	6	50	55	54
20	Ireland	0	48	54	51
Bye
4	Netherlands

1/8 finals
1	Germany	6	58	55	56
17	Denmark	0	53	50	47
9	Turkey	4	55	53	55	52	26
8	Slovenia	5	50	54	46	54	27
5	Spain	6	52	50	56	56
12	Georgia	2	54	48	52	46
13	Switzerland	3	49	48	56	49
4	Netherlands	5	51	53	55	49

Quarterfinals
1	Germany	6	55	53	54
8	Slovenia	0	54	44	49
5	Spain	4	55	52	55	54	27
4	Netherlands	5	55	52	52	55	29

Semifinals
1	Germany	0	53	54	51
4	Netherlands	6	57	57	53

=== Section 2 ===
1/12 finals
3	France
Bye
19	Israel	5	56	55	54	54
14	Czech Republic	3	56	53	55	53
11	Belgium	4	56	54	48	51	25
22	Azerbaijan	5	48	51	51	54	27
Bye
6	United Kingdom
7	Ukraine
Bye
23	Finland	0	46	49	47
10	Greece	6	53	55	55
15	Slovakia	5	53	55	52
18	Poland	1	51	55	47
Bye
2	Italy

1/8 finals
3	France	5	55	55	52
19	Israel	1	45	50	52
22	Azerbaijan	2	49	50	50	42
6	United Kingdom	6	54	48	53	55
7	Ukraine	5	52	51	51
10	Greece	1	44	51	45
15	Slovakia	0	48	51	48
2	Italy	6	54	54	53

Quarterfinals
3	France	6	57	57	56
6	United Kingdom	0	51	53	52
7	Ukraine	0	54	52	54
2	Italy	6	57	53	58

Semifinals
3	France	5	56	55	55
2	Italy	1	54	55	53
