= 2024 European Archery Championships – Men's team compound =

Archery competition

Men's team compound at the 2024 European Archery Championships
- Location: Essen, Germany
- Dates: 7–11 June
- Competitors: 48 from 16 nations
- Teams: 16

Medalists
gold medal	Marco Bruno; Michea Godano; Federico Pagnoni	Italy
silver medal	Batuhan Akçaoğlu; Emircan Haney; Sezgin Yağız	Turkey
bronze medal	Rasmus Bramsen; Nicklas Bredal Bryld; Mathias Fullerton	Denmark

2024 European Archery Championships
Men	Recurve	Compound
Women	Recurve	Compound
Team	Men's recurve	Men's compound
Team	Women's recurve	Women's compound
Mixed team	Recurve	Compound

The men's team compound competition at the 2024 European Archery Championships took place from 7 to 11 June in Essen, Germany.

== Qualification round ==
Results after 216 arrows.

Rank	Nation	Name	Score	10+X	X
1	Turkey	Batuhan Akçaoğlu; Emircan Haney; Sezgin Yağız	2123	179	88
2	Netherlands	Sil Pater; Mike Schloesser; Jay Tjin-A-Djie	2106	164	82
3	Austria	Michael Matzner; Thomas Preisser; Nico Wiener	2104	161	79
4	United Kingdom	Adam Carpenter; Ajay Scott; Kai Thomas-Prause	2099	157	66
5	Denmark	Rasmus Bramsen; Nicklas Bredal Bryld; Mathias Fullerton	2098	160	77
6	France	Quentin Baraër; Victor Bouleau; François Dubois	2096	160	75
7	Italy	Marco Bruno; Michea Godano; Federico Pagnoni	2096	160	72
8	Slovakia	Jozef Bošanský; Matus Durny; Marcel Pavlik	2096	159	80
9	Poland	Rafał Dobrowolski; Przemysław Konecki; Lukasz Przybylski	2075	141	59
10	Germany	Ruven Flüß; Sebastian Hamdorf; Henning Lüpkemann	2071	141	71
11	Portugal	Cláudio Alves; Rui Pereira Baptista; Carlos Resende	2070	131	39
12	Finland	Jere Forsberg; Antti Peltoniemi; Matti Tella	2068	137	56
13	Slovenia	Aljaž Matija Brenk; Tim Jevšnik; Staš Modic	2060	137	64
14	Greece	Dimitrios-Konstantinos Drakiotis; Athanasios Kostopoulos; Stavros Koumertas	2053	120	53
15	Ukraine	Karpenko Sviatoslav; Nedelko Daniil; Vitalii Vdovenko	2035	111	37
16	Lithuania	Rolandas Baranauskas; Jonas Grigaravičius; Marius Grigaravičius	2033	112	42

== Elimination round ==
1/8 finals
1	Turkey	232
16	Lithuania	227
9	Poland	233
8	Slovakia	228
5	Denmark	229
12	Finland	220
13	Slovenia	228
4	United Kingdom	226
3	Austria	227
14	Greece	231
11	Portugal	230
6	France	232
7	Italy	228
10	Germany	224
15	Ukraine	223
2	Netherlands	225

Quarterfinals
1	Turkey	239
9	Poland	231
5	Denmark	232
13	Slovenia	228
14	Greece	228
6	France	237
7	Italy	232
2	Netherlands	226

Semifinals
1	Turkey	235
5	Denmark	234
6	France	234^{29}
7	Italy	234^{30}

Final
1	Turkey	231
7	Italy	233
Third place
5	Denmark	230
6	France	227
