= 2026 European Archery Championships – Women's individual recurve =

Archery competition

Women's individual recurve at the 2026 European Archery Championships
- Venue: Antalya Centennial Archery Field
- Location: Antalya, Turkey
- Dates: 19–24 May
- Competitors: 81 from 34 nations

Medalists
gold medal	Nurinisso Makhmudova
silver medal	Elia Canales	Spain
bronze medal	Elif Berra Gökkır	Turkey

The women's individual recurve competition at the 2026 European Archery Championships took place from 19 to 24 May in Antalya, Turkey.

== Qualification round ==
Results after 72 arrows.

Rank	Name	Nation	Score	X	10
1	Marie Horáčková	Czech Republic	672	10	24
2	Elia Canales	Spain	666	13	14
3	Paula Álvarez	Spain	665	10	20
4	Elisabeth Straka	Austria	662	12	18
5	Roberta Di Francesco	Italy	662	10	17
6	Penny Healey	Great Britain	661	7	20
7	Caroline Lopez	France	660	10	15
8	Nurinisso Makhmudova	AIN	658	9	15
9	Tatiana Andreoli	Italy	658	11	15
10	Anastasia Pavlova	Ukraine	657	9	23
11	Elif Berra Gökkır	Turkey	657	8	22
12	Olivia Doigo	Switzerland	656	6	17
13	Megan Costall	Great Britain	654	5	17
14	Katharina Bauer	Germany	653	9	18
15	Mădălina Amăistroaie	Romania	650	5	15
16	Megan Havers	Great Britain	649	10	11
17	Mila Fremery-Delestan	France	649	8	11
18	Veronika Marchenko	Ukraine	648	8	14
19	Žana Pintarič	Slovenia	648	7	19
20	Dünya Yenihayat	Turkey	646	6	16
21	Lili Örkényi	Hungary	646	6	14
22	Quinty Roeffen	Netherlands	645	10	13
23	Gizem Özkan	Turkey	644	7	14
24	Chiara Rebagliati	Italy	643	8	11
25	Karina Kozłowska	Poland	642	5	16
26	Triinu Lilienthal	Estonia	640	9	17
27	Carlota Navas	Spain	640	7	10
28	Kirstine Danstrup Andersen	Denmark	640	6	16
29	Elisa Tartler	Germany	639	4	12
30	Sofiia Rumiantseva	AIN	637	9	9
31	Martyna Stach	Poland	636	8	14
32	Reena Pärnat	Estonia	635	5	13
33	Alexandra Mîrca	Moldova	635	2	18
34	Charline Schwarz	Germany	633	9	14
35	Hanna Marusava	Belarus	633	7	12
36	Medea Gvinchidze	Georgia	632	6	10
37	Kristína Drusková	Slovakia	631	3	14
38	Lisa Barbelin	France	630	6	19
39	Karyna Dziominskaya	Belarus	629	4	11
40	Tsiko Putkaradze	Georgia	628	4	14
41	Fatima Huseynli	Azerbaijan	628	2	12
42	Aliaksandra Stralets	Belarus	627	6	9
43	Mari Niemelä	Finland	627	3	12
44	Dzvenyslava Chernyk	Ukraine	626	6	12
45	Raya Ivanova	Bulgaria	625	6	12
46	Anatoli Gkorila	Greece	624	4	12
47	Evangelia Psarra	Greece	622	7	15
48	Martina Ivanova	Bulgaria	618	7	10
49	Fleur van de Ven	Netherlands	618	2	12
50	Balzhin Dorzhieva	AIN	616	5	7
51	Inka Limingoja	Finland	615	4	12
52	Erika Jangnäs	Sweden	613	7	10
53	Elena Bendíková	Slovakia	612	3	14
54	Ida-Lotta Lassila	Finland	611	5	13
55	Giorgia Cesarini	San Marino	610	10	8
56	Laura Amato	Switzerland	609	5	7
57	Lala Abdurahmanova	Azerbaijan	606	6	7
58	Denisa Hurban Baránková	Slovakia	605	6	8
59	Nikoli Streapunina	Moldova	604	5	10
60	Urška Čavič	Slovenia	602	4	9
61	Łucja Wesołowska	Poland	601	4	8
62	Roisin Mooney	Ireland	601	3	7
63	Marín Aníta Hilmarsdóttir	Iceland	600	6	6
64	Laura van der Winkel	Netherlands	598	4	14
65	Salome Kharshiladze	Georgia	596	1	6
66	Jindřiška Vaněčková	Czech Republic	594	6	11
67	Hrachuhi Kirakosyan	Armenia	594	6	4
68	Maria Nasoula	Greece	592	6	7
69	Emīlija Gārde	Latvia	589	3	6
70	Svetlana Tatarlõ	Estonia	587	4	4
71	Monika Vančurová	Czech Republic	584	3	9
72	Ella Vanlangenakker	Belgium	583	2	5
73	Kasandra Berzan	Moldova	580	3	8
74	Jeļena Kononova	Latvia	579	2	10
75	Kristina Pruccoli	San Marino	577	5	7
76	Yaylagul Ramazanova	Azerbaijan	570	2	9
77	Rowanna Hanlon	Ireland	570	2	9
78	Maria Pavlova	Bulgaria	569	3	6
79	Valgerður Hjaltested	Iceland	551	4	2
80	Pernille Krogh	Faroe Islands	522	0	6
81	Astrid Daxböck	Iceland	455	3	4

== Elimination round ==
=== Finals ===
Quarterfinals
17	(France) Mila Fremery-Delestan	4	30	27	27	26	28
8	(Individual Neutral Athletes) Nurinisso Makhmudova	6	25	28	28	26	28
44	(Ukraine) Dzvenyslava Chernyk	0	24	28	25
4	(Austria) Elisabeth Straka	6	28	29	29
3	(Spain) Paula Álvarez	5^{8}	28	27	29	21	28
11	(Turkey) Elif Berra Gökkır	6^{8+}	29	27	28	26	26
58	(Slovakia) Denisa Hurban Baránková	3	29	27	25	29	25
2	(Spain) Elia Canales	7	29	29	26	27	30

Semifinals
8	(Individual Neutral Athletes) Nurinisso Makhmudova	6	26	28	29	27
4	(Austria) Elisabeth Straka	2	23	28	24	27
11	(Turkey) Elif Berra Gökkır	4	27	26	27	27	28
2	(Spain) Elia Canales	6	28	27	27	26	28

Final
8	(Individual Neutral Athletes) Nurinisso Makhmudova	6	24	27	27	27	26
2	(Spain) Elia Canales	4	27	25	26	27	26
Third place
4	(Austria) Elisabeth Straka	5^{9}	24	27	27	25	24
11	(Turkey) Elif Berra Gökkır	6^{9+}	27	26	26	25	26

=== Top half ===
==== Section 1 ====
1/48 finals
33	(Moldova) A Mîrca	6	27	27	25
80	(Faroe Islands) P Krogh	0	17	18	19
81	(Iceland) A Daxböck	0	18	20	21
32	(Estonia) R Pärnat	6	26	27	26
65	(Georgia (country)) S Kharshiladze	6^{9+}	17	26	23	24	28
48	(Bulgaria) M Ivanova	5^{9}	27	25	28	24	25
49	(Netherlands) F van de Ven	6	27	28	23	28	26
64	(Netherlands) L van der Winkel	4	28	24	27	26	24

1/24 finals
33	(Moldova) A Mîrca	2	27	22	28	28
32	(Estonia) R Pärnat	6	29	24	28	28
17	(France) M Fremery-Delestan	6	25	27	25	29
65	(Georgia (country)) S Kharshiladze	2	23	21	26	27
49	(Netherlands) F van de Ven	2	25	26	28	26
16	(United Kingdom) M Havers	6	28	28	27	28

1/16 finals
1	(Czech Republic) M Horáčková	2	27	26	28	28
32	(Estonia) R Pärnat	6	28	28	27	29
17	(France) M Fremery-Delestan	6	28	25	27	29	29
16	(United Kingdom) M Havers	4	29	26	26	27	28

1/8 finals
32	(Estonia) R Pärnat	2	26	27	25	19
17	(France) M Fremery-Delestan	6	28	29	23	27

==== Section 2 ====
1/48 finals
57	(Azerbaijan) L Abdurahmanova	6	27	28	23	25	26
56	(Switzerland) L Amato	4	26	25	24	28	25
41	(Azerbaijan) F Huseynli	6	27	28	26
72	(Belgium) E Vanlangenakker	0	25	22	24
73	(Moldova) K Berzan	4	28	26	25	27	25
40	(Georgia (country)) T Putkaradze	6	25	29	26	25	27

1/24 finals
9	(Italy) T Andreoli	6	26	26	24
57	(Azerbaijan) L Abdurahmanova	0	23	22	22
41	(Azerbaijan) F Huseynli	2	26	27	23	26
24	(Italy) C Rebagliati	6	26	27	25	28
25	(Poland) K Kozłowska	6^{9}	29	26	25	27	25
40	(Georgia (country)) T Putkaradze	5^{5}	29	28	22	25	29

1/16 finals
9	(Italy) T Andreoli	2	27	26	28	26
24	(Italy) C Rebagliati	6	28	27	24	27
25	(Poland) K Kozłowska	2	25	25	27	27
8	(Individual Neutral Athletes) N Makhmudova	6	28	27	27	27

1/8 finals
24	(Italy) C Rebagliati	3	29	27	29	27	25
8	(Individual Neutral Athletes) N Makhmudova	7	27	29	30	27	28

==== Section 3 ====
1/48 finals
37	(Slovakia) K Drusková	5^{8}	22	30	25	21	25
76	(Azerbaijan) Y Ramazanova	6^{9}	27	24	25	20	26
69	(Latvia) E Gārde	0	25	24	23
44	(Ukraine) D Chernyk	6	27	26	25
53	(Slovakia) E Bendíková	6	22	27	25
60	(Slovenia) U Čavič	0	20	21	19

1/24 finals
76	(Azerbaijan) Y Ramazanova	4	24	26	27	25	23
28	(Denmark) KD Andersen	6	29	24	25	28	27
21	(Hungary) L Örkényi	2	26	25	28	26
44	(Ukraine) D Chernyk	6	28	27	24	28
53	(Slovakia) E Bendíková	4	26	26	27	27	26
12	(Switzerland) O Doigo	6	28	26	29	24	26

1/16 finals
5	(Italy) R Di Francesco	2	27	26	29	26
28	(Denmark) KD Andersen	6	29	30	26	30
44	(Ukraine) D Chernyk	7	28	29	28	29
12	(Switzerland) O Doigo	1	26	28	28	26

1/8 finals
28	(Denmark) KD Andersen	3	27	17	25	25	26
44	(Ukraine) D Chernyk	7	27	28	24	28	28

==== Section 4 ====
1/48 finals
61	(Poland) Ł Wesołowska	6	20	27	29	26	26
52	(Sweden) E Jangnäs	4	23	24	23	28	24
45	(Bulgaria) R Ivanova	6^{10}	24	27	29	28	27
68	(Greece) M Nasoula	5^{9}	25	27	25	26	29
77	(Republic of Ireland) R Hanlon	1	14	22	25	26
36	(Georgia (country)) M Gvinchidze	7	26	26	25	28

1/24 finals
13	(United Kingdom) M Costall	7	26	27	28	29
61	(Poland) Ł Wesołowska	1	26	25	23	25
45	(Bulgaria) R Ivanova	2	28	26	23	25
20	(Turkey) D Yenihayat	6	27	29	29	27
29	(Germany) E Tartler	4	26	27	27	26	24
36	(Georgia (country)) M Gvinchidze	6	27	26	26	28	26

1/16 finals
13	(United Kingdom) M Costall	3	26	29	27	28	25
20	(Turkey) D Yenihayat	7	26	28	28	29	27
36	(Georgia (country)) M Gvinchidze	2	28	26	23	27
4	(Austria) E Straka	6	27	29	25	28

1/8 finals
20	(Turkey) D Yenihayat	0	28	27	25
4	(Austria) E Straka	6	29	28	28

=== Bottom half ===
==== Section 5 ====
1/48 finals
35	(Belarus) H Marusava	6	27	26	27
78	(Bulgaria) M Pavlova	0	23	25	26
67	(Armenia) H Kirakosyan	0	21	22	24
46	(Greece) A Gkorila	6	24	27	27
51	(Finland) I Limingoja	6	27	25	27
62	(Republic of Ireland) R Mooney	0	19	20	26

1/24 finals
35	(Belarus) H Marusava	4	26	28	26	26	26
30	(Individual Neutral Athletes) S Rumiantseva	6	26	26	27	26	27
19	(Slovenia) Ž Pintarič	7	27	27	27	26	26
46	(Greece) A Gkorila	3	26	28	26	26	25
51	(Finland) I Limingoja	2	25	28	27	27
14	(Germany) K Bauer	6	28	27	28	29

1/16 finals
3	(Spain) P Álvarez	6	24	27	27	28	28
30	(Individual Neutral Athletes) S Rumiantseva	4	25	27	27	25	26
19	(Slovenia) Ž Pintarič	3	27	28	24	29	25
14	(Germany) K Bauer	7	30	28	29	28	26

1/8 finals
3	(Spain) P Álvarez	6	26	28	29	28
14	(Germany) K Bauer	2	28	26	25	27

==== Section 6 ====
1/48 finals
59	(Moldova) N Streapunina	4	23	25	25	25	26
54	(Finland) I Lassila	6	23	21	27	26	26
43	(Finland) M Niemelä	3	18	23	26	26	24
70	(Estonia) S Tatarlõ	7	27	27	24	26	26
75	(San Marino) K Pruccoli	0	25	23	25
38	(France) L Barbelin	6	28	28	28

1/24 finals
11	(Turkey) EB Gökkır	6	26	28	28	28
54	(Finland) I Lassila	2	27	24	23	26
70	(Estonia) S Tatarlõ	5	27	26	27	24	26
22	(Netherlands) Q Roeffen	6	27	25	29	27	25
27	(Spain) C Navas	6	29	25	29	28	25
38	(France) L Barbelin	5	29	26	28	27	27

1/16 finals
11	(Turkey) EB Gökkır	7	28	29	26	28	29
22	(Netherlands) Q Roeffen	3	27	25	28	28	26
27	(Spain) C Navas	6	29	27	26	26
6	(United Kingdom) P Healey	2	25	26	28	25

1/8 finals
11	(Turkey) EB Gökkır	6	29	29	27	27
27	(Spain) C Navas	2	26	28	28	26

==== Section 7 ====
1/48 finals
39	(Belarus) K Dziominskaya	6	28	29	26
74	(Latvia) J Kononova	0	24	25	23
71	(Czech Republic) M Vančurová	5^{7}	24	22	27	25	27
42	(Belarus) A Stralets	6^{7+}	24	29	29	24	22
55	(San Marino) G Cesarini	4	25	29	25	26	28
58	(Slovakia) D Hurban Baránková	6	25	26	28	28	28

1/24 finals
39	(Belarus) K Dziominskaya	5^{8}	25	25	25	29	26
26	(Estonia) T Lilienthal	6^{9}	25	25	25	25	27
23	(Turkey) G Özkan	6	26	28	29	25	27
42	(Belarus) A Stralets	4	28	25	28	29	26
58	(Slovakia) D Hurban Baránková	6	28	29	28
10	(Ukraine) A Pavlova	0	26	28	27

1/16 finals
7	(France) C Lopez	4	26	27	30	27	27
26	(Estonia) T Lilienthal	6	29	26	29	28	30
23	(Turkey) G Özkan	3	24	27	26	29	27
58	(Slovakia) D Hurban Baránková	7	26	29	22	29	28

1/8 finals
26	(Estonia) T Lilienthal	4	27	25	27	28	26
58	(Slovakia) D Hurban Baránková	6	27	28	28	26	26

==== Section 8 ====
1/48 finals
63	(Iceland) MA Hilmarsdóttir	0	25	26	24
50	(Individual Neutral Athletes) B Dorzhieva	6	27	27	27
47	(Greece) E Psarra	4	26	24	16	27	25
66	(Czech Republic) J Vaněčková	6	28	24	26	25	25
79	(Iceland) V Hjaltested	0	23	26	23
34	(Germany) C Schwarz	6	27	27	28

1/24 finals
15	(Romania) M Amăistroaie	7	27	25	28	29
50	(Individual Neutral Athletes) B Dorzhieva	1	26	25	26	27
66	(Czech Republic) J Vaněčková	4	24	27	25	28	26
18	(Ukraine) V Marchenko	6	27	26	29	27	27
31	(Poland) M Stach	2	25	27	29	17
34	(Germany) C Schwarz	6	28	28	27	28

1/16 finals
15	(Romania) M Amăistroaie	4	27	28	25	30	26
18	(Ukraine) V Marchenko	6	28	26	28	29	28
34	(Germany) C Schwarz	5^{9}	26	27	28	29	28
2	(Spain) E Canales	6^{10}	26	28	27	27	29

1/8 finals
18	(Ukraine) V Marchenko	4	29	27	29	29	27
2	(Spain) E Canales	6	29	28	28	29	30
