= Amélie Cordeau =

French archer (born 2005)

Personal information
- Born: 1 October 2005 (age 21) Ley, Moselle, France

Sport
- Sport: Archery

Achievements and titles
- Olympic finals: 2024
- Regional finals: 2024
- National finals: 2022
Medal record
Women's recurve archery
Representing France
European Championships
| Gold medal – first place | 2024 Essen | Team |
World Youth Championships
| Gold medal – first place | 2021 Wrocław | Team |

Amélie Cordeau (born 1 October 2005) is a French archer who was part of French teams that won the team recurve events at the 2024 European Archery Championships and the 2021 World Archery Youth Championships. She competed at the 2024 Summer Olympics in Paris.

== Career ==
Cordeau started archery at the age of four. Cordeau was part of the French team that won the women's team recurve cadet event at the 2021 World Archery Youth Championships. She won the individual women's recurve event at the 2022 European Under-18 Archery Championships, and in the same year she became French national champion in the same event. Cordeau started competing at senior level for France in 2023.

Cordeau was part of the French team alongside Lisa Barbelin and Caroline Lopez that won the team recurve event at the 2024 European Archery Championships. At the age of 18, Cordeau was selected in the French team for the 2024 Summer Olympics in Paris. During the ranking round she was seeded 17th. She made it to the round of 32 before being knocked out by Megan Havers.

== Personal life ==
Cordeau is from Annemasse, Haute-Savoie, France. Her father Richard is a former French archer.
