= Mykhailo Usach =

Ukrainian archer (born 1996)

Personal information
- Born: 20 November 1996 (age 29) Berezne, Rivne Oblast, Ukraine

Sport
- Country: Ukraine
- Sport: Archery
- Event: Recurve
- Club: Dynamo
- Coached by: O. Avdentov
Medal record
Men's recurve archery
Representing Ukraine
European Indoor Championships
Gold medal – first place	2024 Varaždin	Team
Gold medal – first place	2026 Plovdiv	Individual
Bronze medal – third place	2024 Varaždin	Individual
Bronze medal – third place	2026 Plovdiv	Team
- Updated on 14 July 2024

Mykhailo Usach (Ukrainian: Михайло Володимирович Усач; born 20 November 1996 in Berezne, Rivne Oblast, Ukraine) is a Ukrainian archer. He is expected to represent Ukraine at the 2024 Summer Olympics in men's individual and mixed team competition.

== Career ==
Usach started his international competitive career in 2022. At the 2024 European Championships, he finished 5th in the qualification round, being the highest among his teammates, but he lost to Spain's Ken Sánchez in the round of 32. In the team competition, Usach, Ovchynnikov, and Hunbin finished 7th in the qualification round, defeated Great Britain in the round of 16 and eventually lost to the Netherlands in the quarterfinal. Together with Veronika Marchenko, Usach entered 7th into the main round of the mixed team competition where they lost to the eventual winner Germany in the quarterfinal.

Usach finished 4th at the 2024 European Continental Qualification Tournament, therefore obtaining a quota for Ukraine, and was selected to compete at the 2024 Summer Olympics. He will be one of two athletes from Rivne Oblast competing at the Games.

== Personal life ==
Usach graduated from Academician Stepan Demianchuk International University of Economics and Humanities in Rivne where he studied physical culture, health studies and sports.
