= Laura van der Winkel =

Dutch archer (born 2001)

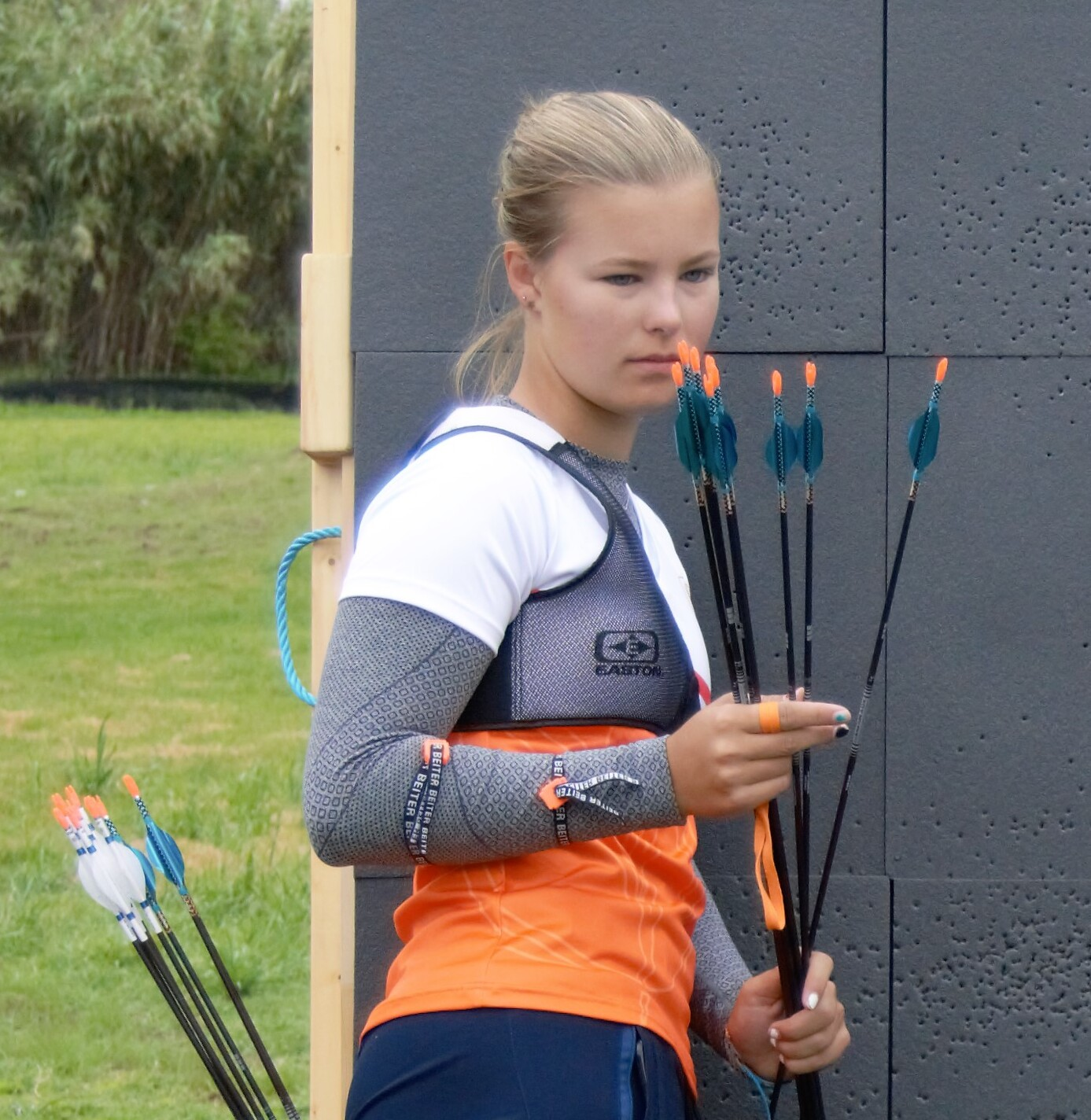
- Archery at the 2018 Summer Youth Olympics

Personal information
- National team: Netherlands
- Born: 15 November 2001 (age 24) Best

Sport
- Sport: Archery
- Event: Recurve
Medal record
European Championships
Silver medal – second place	2024 Essen	Women´s Team
Bronze medal – third place	2024 Essen	Mixed Team
World Cup
Silver medal – second place	2022 Antalya	Individual recurve
- Updated on 22 July 2022

Laura van der Winkel (Best, 15 November 2001) is a Dutch recurve archer. She won a silver medal at the 2024 European Archery Championships in the women's team event representing the Netherlands together with Gabriela Schloesser and Quinty Roeffen. In the same competition she won a bronze medal in the mixed team event together with Steve Wijler.

== Life ==
Van der Winkel studies biotechnology at the HAN University of Applied Sciences.

== Career ==
Van der Winkel trained weekly at the Regional Training Center of the Koninklijke HandboogSport Nederland, the archery regulating body in the Netherlands. In 2017, at 16, she won the Kings of Archery tournament. The next year she won the Dutch senior title.

Her international breakthrough came in 2022 when she placed second at the 2022 Archery World Cup in Antalya. Van der Winkel won a silver medal at the 2024 European Archery Championships with the Dutch women's team and a bronze medal with Steve Wijler in the mixed team event. Van der Winkel qualified for the 2024 Summer Olympics as member of the Dutch women's team.
