= Archery at the 2023 European Games – Women's team recurve =

Women's team recurve at the 2023 European Games
- Venue: Plaszowianka Archery Park
- Date: 23–24 June
- Competitors: 24 from 8 nations
- Teams: 8

Medalists
| gold medal | Penny Healey; Bryony Pitman; Jaspreet Sagoo | Great Britain |
| silver medal | Audrey Adiceom; Lisa Barbelin; Caroline Lopez | France |
| bronze medal | Tatiana Andreoli; Lucilla Boari; Chiara Rebagliati | Italy |

The women's team recurve competition at the 2023 European Games was held from 23 to 24 June at the Plaszowianka Archery Park in Kraków.

== Records ==
Prior to the competition, the existing world, European and Games records were as follows:

- 216 arrow ranking round

| World record | South Korea; Chang Hye-jin; Kang Chae-young; Lee Eun-kyung | 2053 | Antalya, Turkey | 21 May 2018 |
| European record | Germany; Katharina Bauer; Michelle Kroppen; Lisa Unruh | 2010 | Lausanne, Switzerland | 18 May 2021 |
| Games record | Russia; Anna Balsukova; Ksenia Perova; Inna Stepanova | 1963 | Minsk, Belarus | 21 June 2019 |

== Results ==
=== Qualification round ===
| Rank | Nation | Archer | Individual total | Team total | Notes |
|---|---|---|---|---|---|
| 1 | Germany | Katharina Bauer; Michelle Kroppen; Charline Schwarz | 661; 680; 659 | 2000 GR | |
| 2 | Italy | Tatiana Andreoli; Lucilla Boari; Chiara Rebagliati | 663; 656; 653 | 1972 | |
| 3 | Great Britain | Penny Healey; Bryony Pitman; Jaspreet Sagoo | 681; 652; 637 | 1970 | T. 85;28 |
| 4 | France | Audrey Adiceom; Lisa Barbelin; Caroline Lopez | 653; 659; 658 | 1970 | T. 81;19 |
| 5 | Turkey | Ezgi Başaran; Gülnaz Büşranur Coşkun; Zeynep Köse | 650; 624; 642 | 1916 | |
| 6 | Denmark | Kirstine Danstrup Andersen; Randi Degn; Nanna Jakobsen | 651; 644; 597 | 1892 | |
| 7 | Slovenia | Urška Čavič; Žana Pintarič; Ana Umer | 619; 636; 617 | 1872 | |
| 8 | Poland | Natalia Leśniak; Wioleta Myszor; Magdalena Śmiałkowska | 636; 588; 647 | 1871 | |

=== Elimination round ===
Quarterfinals
1 | Germany | 6 | 57 | 51 | 52
8 | Poland | 4 | 54 | 48 | 50
5 | Turkey | 0 | 51 | 56 | 54
4 | France | 6 | 53 | 58 | 57
3 | Great Britain | 5 | 48 | 52 | 56 | 54
6 | Denmark | 3 | 52 | 51 | 52 | 54
7 | Slovenia | 0 | 50 | 48 | 50
2 | Italy | 6 | 55 | 53 | 51

Semifinals
1 | Germany | 0 | 55 | 54 | 56
4 | France | 6 | 56 | 56 | 58
3 | Great Britain | 5 | 51 | 57 | 50 | 54 | 29
2 | Italy | 4 | 56 | 52 | 55 | 50 | 24

Gold medal match
4 | France | 1 | 51 | 50 | 53
3 | Great Britain | 5 | 51 | 55 | 57
Bronze medal match
1 | Germany | 3 | 55 | 55 | 57 | 57
2 | Italy | 5 | 55 | 47 | 58 | 58
