= Jean-Charles Valladont =

French archer (born 1989)

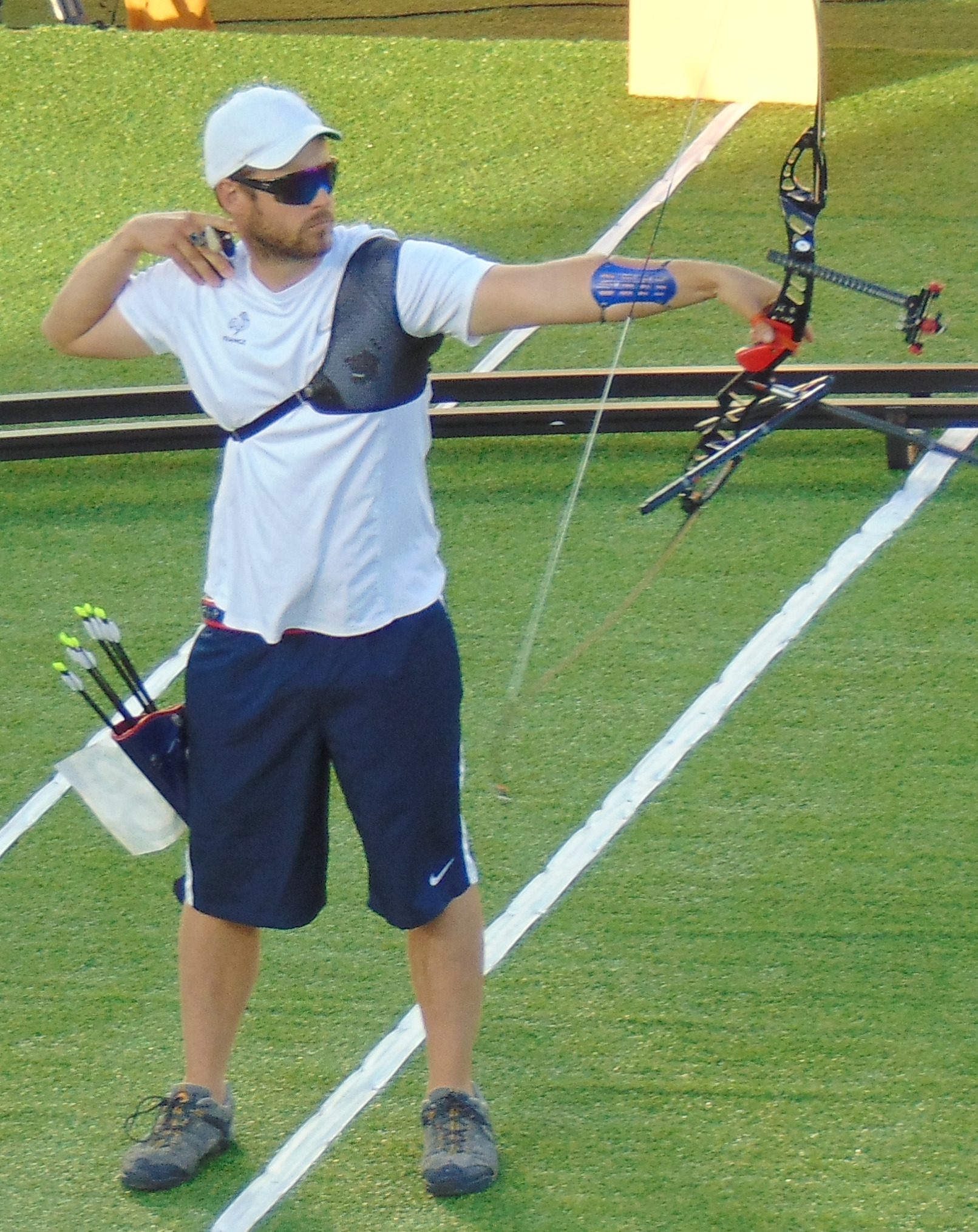
- Valladont at the 2016 Summer Olympics

Personal information
- Born: 20 March 1989 (age 37) Besançon, France
- Height: 180 cm (5 ft 11 in)
- Weight: 83 kg (183 lb)

Sport
- Sport: Archery
Medal record
Men's recurve archery
Representing France
Olympic Games
Silver medal – second place	2024 Paris	Team
Silver medal – second place	2016 Rio de Janeiro	Individual
World Championships
Silver medal – second place	2017 Mexico City	Team
Bronze medal – third place	2013 Belek	Team
World Games
Gold medal – first place	2013 Cali	Individual
European Games
Gold medal – first place	2019 Minsk	Team
European Championship
Gold medal – first place	2016 Nottingham	Individual
Gold medal – first place	2024 Essen	Team
Silver medal – second place	2016 Nottingham	Mixed team
Bronze medal – third place	2018 Legnica	Individual
Bronze medal – third place	2024 Essen	Individual
Bronze medal – third place	2026 Antalya	Team
European Indoor Championships
Gold medal – first place	2022 Laško	Team
Silver medal – second place	2022 Laško	Individual

Jean-Charles Valladont (born 20 March 1989) is a French archer. He competed at the 2008, 2016, 2020 and 2024 Summer Olympics, winning silver medals in 2016 and 2024. He won another silver medal at the 2015 World Cup.

== Career ==
At the 2008 Summer Olympics in Beijing, Valladont finished his ranking round with a total of 656 points, which gave him the 35th seed for the final competition bracket in which he faced Michael Naray in the first round. Naray, who was the 30th seed won the match by 108–106. He was eliminated in the following round by Viktor Ruban who would eventually win the gold medal.

Valladont won the silver medal in the men's recurve event at the 2022 European Indoor Archery Championships held in Laško, Slovenia. He also won the gold medal in the men's team recurve event.

Valladont won the bronze medal in the men's individual recurve event at the 2024 European Archery Championships held in Essen, Germany. He also won the gold medal in the men's team recurve event.
