= Archery at the 2024 Summer Olympics – Qualification =

This article details the qualifying phase for archery at the 2024 Summer Olympics. The competition at these Games were to comprise a total of 128 archers, with an equal distribution between men and women (64 per gender), coming from their respective National Olympic Committees (NOCs); each was permitted to enter a maximum of six archers, three per gender. NOCs that qualified for a gender-based team recurve could select three members to form a squad, ensuring that each of them must compete in the individual recurve.

Twelve slots were available for each gender in the team recurve events, with thirty-six individuals competing against each other through a team-based qualification pathway. While three tickets remained available at the final qualifying meet, the number of quota places at the Worlds had been reduced to three that climbed the podium. The other five tickets would be assigned instead to the continental team champions from Europe, Asia, and the Americas, and to the top two teams vying for qualification through the world rankings after the final qualifying meet.

Throughout the process, twenty-eight individual quota places will be awarded to the highest-ranked archers at the 2023 World Championships in Berlin, Germany, the continental Games (European Games, Asian Games, and the Pan American Games), whether mixed team champions or individual recurve gold medalists, the standalone continental meets (Africa, Europe, Asia, Oceania, and the Americas), and at the final qualification tournament, scheduled for mid-2024.

Host nation France reserves three quota places each for the men's and women's events, along with the mixed team recurve, while four coveted spots are entitled to the eligible NOCs interested to have their archers compete in Paris 2024, as granted by the Universality principle.

To eligibly participate at the Games after obtaining a quota place for NOC, all archers must attain the following minimum qualification standards (MQS) on a 72-arrow, 70-metre round between the first day of the 2023 World Championships and the final entry at a registered World Archery event.

- Men – 70-metre round of 640
- Women – 70-metre round of 610

== Qualifying standards ==
Qualification occurs through a hierarchy of events instead of dates, so the qualified NOC might vacate the coveted spot through an earlier low-priority meet if it eventually grants a qualifying pathway in a higher-priority event (this particularly affects the European Games, held before the World Championships). The following priority order will be respected from highest to lowest to allocate the quota places: (1) World Championships, (2) continental games, (3) continental championships, (4) final qualification tournaments.

The medal-winning squads (gold, silver, and bronze) in the team event from the 2023 Worlds will secure a quota place for their NOC at the Olympics. If the host country France obtains a team place at the Worlds, the vacant slot will be reallocated to the fourth-place team. Three more tickets will each be assigned to the men's and women's team recurve champions from the 2022 Asian Games, the 2023 European Games, and the 2024 Pan American Championships, respectively. The top three or four NOCs per gender (depending on whether France uses its direct host place or qualifies for the Games through the regular competition pathway) will secure three quota places at the Final Olympic Qualification Tournament (FOQT), scheduled for mid-2024, while the remaining team tickets will be awarded to the two highest-ranked NOCs vying for qualification through the world rankings after FOQT.

Twenty-eight individual quota places will be awarded across the five competition phases and through the universality invitation. Three highest-ranked archers outside the team-based qualification will secure a single quota place for their NOC in the men's and women's individual recurve, respectively, at the 2023 Worlds, while six spots will be assigned to each of the top two archers from Europe, Asia, and the Americas at the continental Games. All five continents will stage standalone continental tournaments throughout the qualifying calendar with a specified number of quota places available: Europe (3) and Asia, Africa, and the Americas (2 each), and Oceania (1). The Final Olympic Qualification Tournament, held at the end of the qualifying period, will allocate two more spots per gender for the highest-ranked eligible archers from their respective NOCs. The remaining tickets in each individual recurve are entitled to the eligible NOCs whose archers are interested to compete in Paris 2024 as duly recognized by the Universality principle.

The mixed team recurve champions from Europe, Asia, Africa, the Americas, and Oceania will obtain a quota place per gender in the individual events for Paris 2024 at their respective continental Games.

== Timeline ==
Event	Date	Venue
2023 European Games	June 23–29, 2023	(Poland) Kraków
2023 World Archery Championships	July 28 – August 6, 2023	(Germany) Berlin
2022 Asian Games	October 2–8, 2023	(China) Hangzhou
2023 Pan American Games	November 1–5, 2023	(Chile) Santiago
2023 Asian Archery Championships	November 3–10, 2023	(Thailand) Bangkok
2023 Asian Continental Qualification Tournament	November 9–12, 2023	(Thailand) Bangkok
2023 African Continental Qualification Tournament	November 6–12, 2023	(Tunisia) Nabeul
2023 Pacific Games	November 21–24, 2023	(Solomon Islands) Honiara
2024 Oceania Continental Qualification Tournament	March 16–17, 2024	(New Zealand) Auckland
2024 Pan American Continental Qualification Tournament	April 8–9, 2024	(Colombia) Medellín
2024 Pan American Archery Championships	April 10–14, 2024	(Colombia) Medellín
2024 European Continental Qualification Tournament	May 5–6, 2024	(Germany) Essen
2024 European Archery Championships	May 7–12, 2024	(Germany) Essen
Final Team Qualification Tournament	June 14–17, 2024	(Turkey) Antalya
Final Individual Qualification Tournament	June 14–17, 2024	(Turkey) Antalya

== Qualification summary ==
Nation	Men		Women		Mixed	Total	
Nation	Individual	Team	Individual	Team	Team	Quotas	Athletes
Argentina	1					1	1
Australia	1		1		Yes	3	2
Austria			1			1	1
Azerbaijan			1			1	1
Bangladesh	1					1	1
Bhutan	1					1	1
Brazil	1		1		Yes	3	2
Canada	1		1		Yes	3	2
Chad	1					1	1
Chile	1					1	1
China	3	Yes	3	Yes	Yes	9	6
Chinese Taipei	3	Yes	3	Yes	Yes	9	6
Colombia	3	Yes	1		Yes	6	4
Cuba	1					1	1
Czech Republic	1		1		Yes	3	2
Denmark			1			1	1
Egypt	1		1		Yes	3	2
El Salvador	1					1	1
Estonia			1			1	1
Finland	1					1	1
France	3	Yes	3	Yes	Yes	9	6
Germany	1		3	Yes	Yes	6	4
Great Britain	3	Yes	3	Yes	Yes	9	6
Guinea			1			1	1
India	3	Yes	3	Yes	Yes	9	6
Indonesia	1		3	Yes	Yes	6	4
Iran			1			1	1
Israel	1		1		Yes	3	2
Italy	3	Yes	1		Yes	6	4
Japan	3	Yes	1		Yes	6	4
Kazakhstan	3	Yes				4	3
Luxembourg	1					1	1
Malaysia			3	Yes		4	3
Mexico	3	Yes	3	Yes	Yes	9	6
Moldova	1		1		Yes	3	2
Mongolia	1					1	1
Netherlands	1		3	Yes	Yes	6	4
Poland			1			1	1
Puerto Rico			1			1	1
Romania			1			1	1
San Marino			1			1	1
Slovakia			1			1	1
Slovenia	1		1		Yes	3	2
South Africa	1					1	1
South Korea	3	Yes	3	Yes	Yes	9	6
Spain	1		1		Yes	3	2
Tunisia			1			1	1
Turkey	3	Yes	1		Yes	6	4
Ukraine	1		1		Yes	3	2
United States	1		3	Yes	Yes	6	4
Uzbekistan	1		1		Yes	3	2
Vietnam	1		1		Yes	3	2
Virgin Islands	1					1	1
Total: 53 NOCs	64	12	64	12	27	179	128

== Men's events ==
Event	Location	Archers per NOC	Total places	Qualified NOC
Team – 12 teams, 36 male archers
Host nation	—N/a	3	3	France
2023 World Archery Championships	(Germany) Berlin	3	9	South Korea; Turkey; Japan
2023 Asian Archery Championships	(Thailand) Bangkok	3	3	Kazakhstan
2024 Pan American Archery Championships	(Colombia) Medellín	3	3	Colombia
2024 European Archery Championships	(Germany) Essen	3	3	Italy
Final Team Qualification Tournament	(Turkey) Antalya	3	9	Mexico; Chinese Taipei; Great Britain
WA World Olympic Ranking List	—N/a	3	6	India; China
Mixed team – 5 teams, 5 male archers
2023 European Games	(Poland) Kraków	1	1	Spain
2022 Asian Games	(China) Hangzhou	1	0	—N/a
2023 Pan American Games	(Chile) Santiago	1	1	United States
2023 African Continental Qualification Tournament	(Tunisia) Nabeul	1	1	Chad
2023 Pacific Games	(Solomon Islands) Honiara	1	1	Australia
Individual – 23 male archers
2023 European Games	(Poland) Kraków	1	2	Germany; Moldova
2023 World Archery Championships	(Germany) Berlin	1	3	Canada; Brazil; Indonesia
2022 Asian Games	(China) Hangzhou	1	1 (Note: Mongolia and China qualified originally, later, China qualified through the WA Ranking Team List and therefore their men's individual quota spot will be allocated to individual world ranking.)	Mongolia
2023 Pan American Games	(Chile) Santiago	1	1 (Note: Mexico and Chile qualified originally, later, Mexico qualified through the 2024 Final Team Qualification Tournament and therefore their men's individual quota spot will be allocated to 2024 Final Individual Qualification Tournament.)	Chile
2023 Asian Continental Qualification Tournament	(Thailand) Bangkok	1	0 (Note: India and Chinese Taipei qualified originally, later, Chinese Taipei qualified through the 2024 Final Team Qualification Tournament and therefore their men's individual quota spot will be allocated to Final Individual Qualification Tournament.)	—N/a (Note: India and Chinese Taipei qualified originally, later, India qualified through the WA Ranking Team List and therefore their men's individual quota spot will be allocated to individual world ranking.)
2023 African Continental Qualification Tournament	(Tunisia) Nabeul	1	2	Egypt; South Africa
2024 Oceania Continental Qualification Tournament	(New Zealand) Auckland	0	~~1~~	~~New Zealand~~ (Note: Withdrew due to New Zealand Olympic Committee's requirement of achieving a top-16 finish at international tournaments); ~~Tonga~~ (Note: Ineligible due to not reaching the Minimum Qualification Score.)
2024 Pan American Continental Qualification Tournament	(Colombia) Medellín	1	2	Virgin Islands; Argentina
2024 European Continental Qualification Tournament	(Germany) Essen	1	3	Netherlands; Slovenia; Ukraine
Final Individual Qualification Tournament	(Turkey) Antalya	1	5	Uzbekistan; Bangladesh; Cuba; Vietnam; Czech Republic
Universality Places	—N/a	1	2	Bhutan; El Salvador
Reallocation (World ranking)	—N/a	1	3	Israel; Luxembourg; Finland
Total			64	

== Women's events ==
Event	Location	Archers per NOC	Total places	Qualified NOC
Team – 12 teams, 36 female archers
Host nation	—N/a	3	3	France
2023 World Archery Championships	(Germany) Berlin	3	6	Germany; Mexico
2023 Asian Archery Championships	(Thailand) Bangkok	3	3	South Korea
2024 Pan American Archery Championships	(Colombia) Medellín	3	3	United States
2024 European Archery Championships	(Germany) Essen	3	3	Netherlands
Final Team Qualification Tournament	(Turkey) Antalya	3	12 (Note: France finished in the top three at the World Championships, so an additional team quota space is allocated to the Final Team Qualification Tournament.)	China; Malaysia; Great Britain; Chinese Taipei
WA World Olympic Ranking List	—N/a	3	6	India; Indonesia
Mixed team – 5 teams, 5 female archers
2023 European Games	(Poland) Kraków	1	1	Spain
2022 Asian Games	(China) Hangzhou	1	0 (Note: Indonesia qualified through the WA Ranking Team and therefore their women's individual quota spot will be allocated to the individual world ranking.)	—N/a
2023 Pan American Games	(Chile) Santiago	1	0	—N/a
2023 African Continental Qualification Tournament	(Tunisia) Nabeul	1	0	~~Chad~~
2023 Pacific Games	(Solomon Islands) Honiara	1	1	Australia
Individual – 23 female archers
2023 European Games	(Poland) Kraków	1	1 (Note: Great Britain and Italy qualified originally, later, Great Britain qualified through the 2024 Final Team Qualification Tournament and therefore their women's individual quota spot will be allocated to the 2024 Final Individual Qualification Tournament.)	Italy
2023 World Archery Championships	(Germany) Berlin	1	2	Czech Republic; Japan
2022 Asian Games	(China) Hangzhou	1	0 (Note: China and Chinese Taipei qualified originally, later, both teams qualified through the 2024 Final Team Qualification Tournament and therefore their women's individual quota spot will be allocated to the 2024 Final Individual Qualification Tournament.)	—N/a
2023 Pan American Games	(Chile) Santiago	1	2	Brazil; Colombia
2023 Asian Continental Qualification Tournament	(Thailand) Bangkok	1	1 (Note: Malaysia and Uzbekistan qualified originally, later, Malaysia qualified through the 2024 Final Team Qualification Tournament and therefore their women's individual quota spot will be allocated to the 2024 Final Individual Qualification Tournament.)	Uzbekistan
2023 African Continental Qualification Tournament	(Tunisia) Nabeul	1	2	Egypt; Tunisia
2024 Oceania Continental Qualification Tournament	(New Zealand) Auckland	0	~~1~~	~~New Zealand~~; ~~Fiji~~
2024 Pan American Continental Qualification Tournament	(Colombia) Medellín	1	2	Canada; Puerto Rico
2024 European Continental Qualification Tournament	(Germany) Essen	1	3	Austria; Estonia; Turkey
Final Individual Qualification Tournament	(Turkey) Antalya	1	6 (Note: India qualified 1 woman archer through the 2024 Final Individual Qualification Tournament, later, India qualified through the WA Ranking Team List and therefore their women's individual quota spot will be allocated to the individual world ranking.)	Iran; Ukraine; Moldova; Slovakia; Poland; Azerbaijan
Universality Places	—N/a	1	2	Guinea; San Marino
Reallocation (World ranking)	—N/a	1	5	Romania; Israel; Denmark; Slovenia; Vietnam
Total			64	
