= Alex Wise (archer) =

British archer (born 2000)

Alex Wise OLY
Personal information
- Born: 17 August 2000 (age 26) Newcastle upon Tyne, United Kingdom

Sport
- Country: United Kingdom
- Sport: Archery
- Event: Recurve
- Club: Bowmen of Walker
- Coached by: Naomi Folkard; Nicky Hunt

Alex Wise (born 17 August 2000) is a British archer competing in recurve events. He was selected to compete at the 2024 Paris Olympics.

== Early life ==
Born in Newcastle, he joined the Bowmen of Walker club in Newcastle in 2015 after first trying archery whilst on holiday in Turkey. He graduated with a Sport Development degree from Northumbria University.

== Career ==
As a 16-year-old he was selected at junior level for the 2017 European Archery Championships in France. That year, he made his senior debut and competed at the World Archery Youth Championships. In 2018, he won the recurve junior men’s competition at the third stage of the 2017/18 Indoor Archery World Cup in Nîmes, France. In June 2018, alongside Tom Hall and Patrick Huston he won the bronze medal in a team event at the second World Cup of the season in Antalya, Turkey.

He was part of the British Archery team that earned qualification for 2020 Tokyo Olympics and traveled to the games as a non-playing reserve.

He won a silver medal at the 2022 Archery World Cup in Turkey, in the recurve mixed team final alongside Bryony Pitman.

In June 2024, alongside Conor Hall and Tom Hall, he won gold in the recurve men’s team division at the Veronica's Cup in Slovenia. That month, the trio also secured qualification for the team event at the 2024 Olympic Games by finishing third at the final qualifying event in Antalya. In July 2024, he was officially named in the British team for the 2024 Paris Olympics., alongside teammates Conor Hall and Tom Hall. In the individual, he was knocked out in the round of 32. In the team round they were knocked out by the Chinese Taipei team, in the first round.
