= 2024 European Archery Championships – Men's team recurve =

Archery competition

Men's team recurve at the 2024 European Archery Championships
- Location: Essen, Germany
- Dates: 7–12 May
- Competitors: 81 from 27 nations
- Teams: 27

Medalists
gold medal	Thomas Chirault; Baptiste Addis; Jean-Charles Valladont	France
silver medal	Mauro Nespoli; Federico Musolesi; Alessandro Paoli	Italy
bronze medal	Mete Gazoz; Berkim Tümer; Berkay Akkoyun	Turkey

The men's team recurve competition at the 2024 European Archery Championships took place from 7 to 12 May in Essen, Germany.

== Qualification round ==
Results after 216 arrows.

Rank	Nation	Name	Score	10+X	X
1	France	Thomas Chirault; Baptiste Addis; Jean-Charles Valladont	2053	122	46; ER
2	Netherlands	Senna Roos; Gijs Broeksma; Steve Wijler	2030	110	36
3	Italy	Mauro Nespoli; Federico Musolesi; Alessandro Paoli	2029	104	39
4	Turkey	Mete Gazoz; Berkay Akkoyun; Berkim Tümer	2028	112	40
5	Germany	Florian Unruh; Moritz Wieser; Mathias Kramer	2020	100	37
6	Spain	Andrés Temiño; Pablo Acha; Ken Sánchez	2014	101	34
7	Ukraine	Mykhailo Usach; Artem Ovchynnikov; Oleksii Hunbin	2010	98	37
8	Switzerland	Kéziah Chabin; Florian Faber; Félix Möckli	1987	93	25
9	Israel	Roy Dror; Itay Shanny; Niv Frenkel	1980	81	30
10	United Kingdom	Conor Hall; Alex Wise; Tom Hall	1978	80	27
11	Poland	Oskar Kasprowski; Konrad Kupczak; Maksymilian Osuch	1968	85	23
12	Croatia	Lovro Černi; Alen Remar; Leo Sulik	1962	73	24
13	Slovenia	Žiga Ravnikar; Den Habjan Malavašič; Miha Rožič	1959	79	26
14	Denmark	Josef Křesala; Oliver Staudt; Ludvig Njor Henriksen	1957	76	22
15	Armenia	Hamlet Poghosyan; Andrey Hovhannisyan; Vasil Shahnazaryan	1954	68	22
16	Austria	Christian Zwetti; Lukas Kurz; David Macher	1952	70	29
17	Georgia	Aleksandre Machavariani; Temur Makievi; Anri Basiladze	1946	70	18
18	Czech Republic	Richard Krejčí; Adam Li; Josef Křesala	1938	63	17
19	Luxembourg	Pit Klein; Jeff Henckels; Jérôme Ansel	1934	68	20
20	Belgium	Théo Carbonetti; Jarno De Smedt; Arne Collas	1932	68	23
21	Sweden	Jacob Mosén; Kaj Sjöberg; Kevin Hedenvang	1929	72	24
22	Slovakia	Daniel Medveczky; Juraj Duchoň; Miroslav Duchoň	1929	71	16
23	Romania	Mario Țîmpu; Nectarios Condurache; Tamaș Moreh	1910	51	19
24	Latvia	Romans Sergejevs; Dāvis Blāze; Dilans Gods-Romanovskis	1902	62	16
25	Greece	Panagiotis Themelis; Arkadios Damopoulos; Charalampos Iakovidis	1878	43	10
26	Ireland	Carl McCaffrey; Oskar Ronan; Alexander Meyer	1851	50	12
27	Lithuania	Dalius Mačernius; Modestas Šliauteris; Domantas Šuliokas	1849	39	11

== Final round ==
Semifinals
1	France	5	55	59	57	56
4	Turkey	3	57	56	54	56
3	Italy	5	55	56	56	58
2	Netherlands	3	54	56	57	57

Finals
1	France	6	53	52	57
3	Italy	0	51	50	56
Third place
4	Turkey	5	50	52	57	57	29
2	Netherlands	4	57	60	55	56	28

== Elimination round ==
=== Section 1 ===
1/12 finals
1	France
Bye
17	Georgia	1	52	49	54
16	Austria	5	53	49	56
9	Israel	3	54	53	54	53
24	Latvia	5	54	53	54	53
Bye
8	Switzerland
5	Germany
Bye
21	Sweden	4	54	52	54	52	26
12	Croatia	5	55	50	53	55	28
13	Slovenia	5	53	56	53	56	27
20	Belgium	4	57	56	53	53	22
Bye
4	Turkey

1/8 finals
1	France	6	57	57	55
16	Austria	0	53	54	53
24	Latvia	0	49	49	48
8	Switzerland	6	55	54	49
5	Germany	3	55	56	53	53
12	Croatia	5	56	55	53	54
13	Slovenia	2	55	56	52	55
4	Turkey	6	53	60	54	56

Quarterfinals
1	France	6	57	55	57
8	Switzerland	0	53	48	53
12	Croatia	2	55	56	52	55
4	Turkey	6	53	60	54	56

Semifinals
1	France	5	55	59	57	56
4	Turkey	3	57	56	54	56

=== Section 2 ===
1/12 finals
3	Italy
Bye
19	Portugal	5	52	57	55	54	29
14	Denmark	4	57	55	58	52	27
11	Croatia	5	53	53	55	55	26
22	Slovakia	3	51	54	56	52	25
Bye
6	Spain
7	Ukraine
Bye
23	Romania	3	57	52	54	54
10	Great Britain	5	50	58	55	54
15	Armenia	4	53	50	55	50	25
18	Czech Republic	5	54	49	53	54	27
Bye
2	Netherlands

1/8 finals
3	Italy	5	57	55	58
19	Luxembourg	1	55	55	53
11	Poland	4'	54	58	46	54	23
6	Spain	5	56	54	57	51	27
7	Ukraine	5	56	56	48	55
10	Great Britain	3	52	56	54	53
18	Czech Republic	0	52	56	52
2	Netherlands	5	55	57	56

Quarterfinals
3	Italy	5	55	52	54	55
6	Spain	3	55	55	48	52
7	Ukraine	3	51	54	54	56
2	Netherlands	5	58	53	57	56

Semifinals
3	Italy	5	55	56	56	58
2	Netherlands	3	54	56	57	57
