= Conor Hall =

British archer (born 1995)

Personal information
- Born: 8 September 1995 (age 31) Belfast, United Kingdom

Sport
- Country: United Kingdom
- Sport: Archery
- Event: Recurve
Medal record
Men's recurve archery
Representing Great Britain
European Championships
Silver medal – second place	2024 Essen	Mixed team

Conor Hall (born 8 September 1995) is a British archer competing in recurve events. He competed in the 2024 Paris Olympics.

== Early life ==
He was born in Belfast, Northern Ireland and attended Campbell College. He took up archery in 2007.

== Career ==
Alongside Bryony Pitman in 2021, he became the first-ever European Field archery mixed team champion in the 2021 European Field Championships in Croatia.

He won the silver medal in the mixed team recurve event at the 2024 European Archery Championships held in Essen, Germany.

In June 2024 alongside Alex Wise and Tom Hall, he won gold in the recurve men’s team division at the Veronica's Cup in Slovenia. In the same month, the trio also qualified for the team event at the 2024 Olympic Games by finishing third at the final qualifying event in Antalya, Turkey. In July 2024, he was officially named to the British team for the 2024 Paris Olympics. At the Olympics, in the Men’s individual, Conor made it to the round of 32 before being knocked out by teammate Tom Hall. In the team round Conor, alongside teammates Tom and Alex Wise were knocked out by the Chinese Taipei team, in the first round.
