= Lisa Barbelin =

French archer (born 2000)

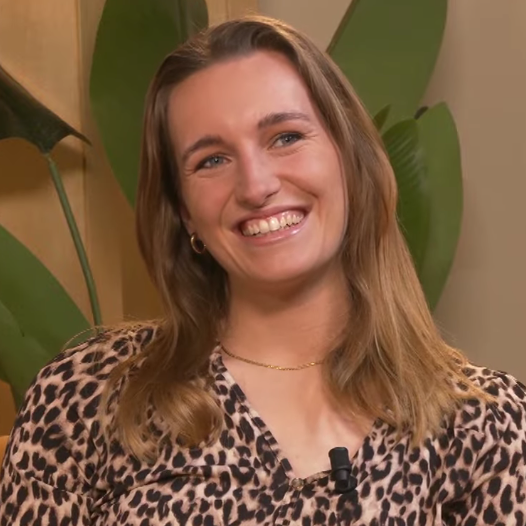
- Barbelin in 2025

Personal information
- Born: 10 April 2000 (age 26) Ley, France

Sport
- Sport: Archery
- Club: Dieuze; Les Archers riomois

Achievements and titles
- Olympic finals: 2020, 2024
- World finals: 2021
- Regional finals: 2021
Medal record
Women's recurve archery
Representing France
Olympic Games
Bronze medal – third place	2024 Paris	Individual
World Championships
Silver medal – second place	2023 Berlin	Team
Bronze medal – third place	2021 Yankton	Team
European Games
Silver medal – second place	2023 Kraków-Małopolska	Team
Mediterranean Games
Gold medal – first place	2026 Taranto	Individual
Silver medal – second place	2026 Taranto	Team
European Championships
Gold medal – first place	2021 Antalya	Individual
Gold medal – first place	2024 Essen	Team
Bronze medal – third place	2024 Essen	Individual
European Indoor Archery Championships
Gold medal – first place	2022 Laško	Individual
Silver medal – second place	2026 Plovdiv	Mixed Team
Bronze medal – third place	2025 Samsun	Individual
World Cup
Bronze medal – third place	2019 Medellín	Team
Bronze medal – third place	2022 Medellín	Team
World Youth Championships
Bronze medal – third place	2017 Rosario	Team
Silver medal – second place	2019 Madrid	Team

Lisa Barbelin (born 10 April 2000) is a French archer, who won the recurve events at the 2021 European Archery Championships, and 2022 European Indoor Archery Championships. She has previously won multiple medals at the World Youth Archery Championships, and won bronze medals in events at the 2019 and 2022 Archery World Cups. In June 2021 she was the world's number one ranked competitor. Barbelin competed in the women’s individual event at the 2020 and 2024 Olympic Games, winning the bronze medal in the latter.

== Career ==
Barbelin has trained at the Société de tir de Dieuze in Dieuze, Moselle, and Les Archers riomois in Auvergne.

She competed at the 2017 European Junior Archery Cup, finishing third in the individual event in Marathon, Greece, and second in the individual and team events in Poreč, Croatia. That year she also came third in the team event at the 2017 World Youth Archery Championships. She was part of the French team that came third in the team event at the 2019 Archery World Cup event in Medellín, Colombia. In the same year, she competed in the World Youth Archery Championships, finishing second in the team event and fourth in the individual event. Later in the year, she attended a 10-day workshop in Gwangju, South Korea, where she was trained by former Olympic champion Ki Bo-bae. In February 2020, Barbelin won the French women's Olympic selection test event. During the COVID-19 pandemic lockdown in France, she trained in her parents' garden in Ley, Moselle.

In December 2020, Barbelin came third at an Indoor Archery World Series that was held virtually. In March 2021, she won an event in Poreč. In June 2021, Barbelin won the recurve event at the 2021 European Archery Championships. She was the first French woman to win a European Archery Championships since Bérengère Schuh in 2008. As a result, she became the number one ranked women's archer, and she qualified for the women's individual event at the 2020 Summer Olympics. Her qualification was assured after winning her quarter-final match at the Championships. Her position as number one women's archer was brief as in the same month she was demoted to second place; she was overtaken by Indian Deepika Kumari. At the Games, Barbelin finished 13th in the ranking round, and was eliminated from the knockout section of the event in the round of 8. Later in the year, Barbelin was part of the French team that came third in the women's team event at the 2021 World Archery Championships. She was eliminated in the quarter-finals of the individual and mixed team events at the Championships.

She won the gold medal in the women's recurve event at the 2022 European Indoor Archery Championships held in Laško, Slovenia. She was part of the French team that finished third in the recurve event at the 2022 Archery World Cup event in Medellín, Colombia. She was part of the French team that came second in the recurve event at the 2023 European Games. At the 2024 European Archery Championships, Barbellin came third in the individual recurve event and was part of the French team that won the team recurve competition.

Barbellin was selected for the 2024 Summer Olympics in Paris, in the women's individual and women's team events. The French team were eliminated in the round of 8. She managed to secure a bronze medal in the women's individual event after defeating Jeon Hun-young with a score of 6–4, becoming the first French female to win a medal in individual event.

== Personal life ==
Barbelin is from Ley, Moselle, France. She studies chemistry at Sorbonne University. Barbelin is also an amateur pianist. She is currently dating Thomas Chirault.
