= Tom Hall (archer) =

British Olympian archer (born 1990)

Personal information
- Full name: Thomas Hall
- Born: 17 September 1990 (age 36) Kenilworth, England

Sport
- Country: Great Britain
- Sport: Archery

Thomas Hall (born 17 September 1990) is a British Olympian archer from Croydon, England in South London.

== Career ==
He competed as a member of the archery squad of Team GB at the 2020 Summer Olympics, in Tokyo. He first took up archery in 2010 while studying at the University of Warwick in Coventry, England. He holds a PhD in chemistry.

At the 2024 Summer Olympics, Tom made it to the round of 16 in the men’s individual, before being knocked out. In the team event alongside Conor Hall and Alex Wise, they were knocked out in the first round by Chinese Taipei. During the games, his wife Emma Davis, cycled 250 miles to meet Tom in Paris.
