= 2024 European Archery Championships – Women's team compound =

Archery competition

Women's team compound at the 2024 European Archery Championships
- Location: Essen, Germany
- Dates: 7–11 May
- Competitors: 33 from 11 nations
- Teams: 11

Medalists
gold medal	Hazal Burun; Ayşe Bera Süzer; Begüm Yuva	Turkey
silver medal	Paula Díaz; Alexa Misis; Andrea Muñoz	Spain
bronze medal	Lisell Jäätma; Meeri-Marita Paas; Maris Tetsmann	Estonia

The women's team compound competition at the 2024 European Archery Championships took place from 7 to 11 May in Essen, Germany.

== Qualification round ==
Results after 216 arrows.

Rank	Nation	Name	Score	10+X	X
1	Turkey	Hazal Burun; Ayşe Bera Süzer; Begüm Yuva	2089	150	56
2	Great Britain	Layla Annison; Grace Chappell; Ella Gibson	2086	147	69
3	Italy	Andrea Moccia; Elisa Roner; Marcella Tonioli	2081	144	61
4	France	Candice Cadronet; Alyssia Chambraud; Sophie Dodemont	2079	140	49
5	Estonia	Lisell Jäätma; Meeri-Marita Paas; Maris Tetsmann	2067	129	34
6	Spain	Paula Díaz; Alexa Misis; Andrea Muñoz	2061	135	56
7	Ukraine	Olha Khomutovska; Kseniia Shkliar; Yulia Stepura	2051	124	50
8	Germany	Marie Marquardt; Katharina Raab; Jennifer Walter	2047	117	45
9	Austria	Viktoriya Dyakova; Ricarda Lukancic; Eva-Maria Seidel	2040	113	46
10	Poland	Sandra Jankowska; Malgorzata Kapusta; Kseniya Markitantova	2028	113	49
11	Iceland	Anna María Alfreðsdóttir; Freyja Dís Benediktsdóttir; Þórdís Unnur Bjarkadóttir	1986	81	28

== Elimination round ==
1/8 finals
9	Austria	227
8	Germany	232
11	Iceland	215
6	Spain	228
7	Ukraine	226
10	Poland	221

Quarterfinals
1	Turkey	234
9	Germany	228
5	Estonia	233^{28+}
4	France	233^{28}
3	Italy	227
6	Spain	231
7	Ukraine	222
2	Great Britain	234

Semifinals
1	Turkey	235
5	Estonia	232
6	Spain	231^{28}
2	Great Britain	231^{27}

Final
1	Turkey	234
6	Spain	218
Third place
5	Estonia	234
2	Great Britain	229
