= Paula Díaz =

Uruguayan model (born 1989)

- Born: Paula Andrea Díaz Galione; 28 January 1989 (age 37)
- Occupations: Model, beauty pageant

Paula Andrea Díaz Galione (born 28 January 1989) is a Uruguayan model and beauty pageant titleholder crowned Miss Uruguay 2008. Díaz represented Uruguay at Miss Universe 2008.

Upon winning the Miss Uruguay 2008 contest, she received US$10,000, a motorcycle, a ticket to Miami, jewelry and beauty treatments. In May, Diaz received a comprehensive preparation in Colombia for her participation in Miss Universe 2008.
