= Bryony Pitman =

British archer (born 1997)

Personal information
- Born: Bryony Michaela Pitman; 13 March 1997 (age 29) Brighton, England
- Education: Northumbria University (BA); Brunel University London (MA)

Sport
- Country: United Kingdom
- Sport: Archery
- Event: Recurve
Medal record
Women's recurve archery
Representing Great Britain
World Championships
Bronze medal – third place	2019 's-Hertogenbosch	Team
World Field Championships
Silver medal – second place	2022 Yankton	Individual
World Games
Silver medal – second place	2022 Birmingham	Individual
European Games
Gold medal – first place	2019 Minsk	Team
Gold medal – first place	2023 Kraków-Małopolska	Team
European Championships
Silver medal – second place	2024 Essen	Mixed team

Bryony Michaela Pitman (born 13 March 1997) is a British archer competing in women's recurve events. She won the gold medal in the women's recurve team event at the 2019 European Games held in Minsk, Belarus. Earlier in 2019, she won the bronze medal in the women's team recurve event at the World Archery Championships held in 's-Hertogenbosch, Netherlands.

== Early life and education ==
Pitman grew up in Shoreham-by-Sea. Her father Gary also arched in his youth. At age 11, she joined Worthing Archery Club.

Pitman attended Cardinal Newman Catholic School in Hove. She graduated with a Bachelor of Arts (BA) in History from Northumbria University in 2020 and a Master of Arts (MA) in Intelligence and Security Studies from Brunel University London in 2022.

== Career ==
Pitman, Daisy Clark and Evangeline Rawlings won the gold medal in the junior women's team event at the 2012 World Field Archery Championships held in Val-d'Isère, France. In 2014, she competed in the girls' individual and mixed team events at the Summer Youth Olympics held in Nanjing, China. In the individual event, Pitman finished in 14th place in the ranking rounds. She advanced to the elimination rounds where she was eliminated in her first match by Regina Romero of Guatemala.

Pitman won the silver medal in the junior women's recurve event at the 2017 European Indoor Archery Championships held in Vittel, France. She also won the bronze medal in the junior women's team recurve event, alongside Alyssia Tromans-Ansell and Elizabeth Warner.

Pitman, Sarah Bettles and Naomi Folkard won the bronze medal in the women's team recurve event at the World Archery Championships held in 's-Hertogenbosch, Netherlands. In the same month, she won the gold medal in the women's recurve team event at the 2019 European Games held in Minsk, Belarus, also alongside Sarah Bettles and Naomi Folkard.

In 2021, Pitman represented Great Britain at the 2020 Summer Olympics in Tokyo, Japan. She competed in the women's individual and women's team events. In the women's individual event, she finished in 38th place in the ranking round and she was eliminated in her third match in the elimination round by eventual silver medalist Elena Osipova of the Russian Olympic Committee athletes. In the same year, Pitman also competed at the 2021 World Archery Championships held in Yankton, United States. She competed in the women's recurve, women's team recurve and recurve mixed team events.

Pitman won the silver medal in the women's recurve event at the 2022 World Games held in Birmingham, Alabama, United States. She won the gold medal in the women's team recurve event at the 2023 European Games held in Poland. She also competed in the women's individual recurve event. In the same year, Pitman competed in the women's individual recurve and team recurve events at the 2023 World Archery Championships held in Berlin, Germany.

Pitman and Conor Hall won the silver medal in the mixed team recurve event at the 2024 European Archery Championships held in Essen, Germany. She also competed in the women's individual recurve and women's team recurve events.

Pitman qualified to compete at the 2024 Summer Olympics. She was knocked out of the individual event, during the round of 32. In the women's team event, alongside teammates Megan Havers and Penny Healey, they were knocked out by Germany in the round of 16.
