= Gabriela Schloesser =

Mexican-Dutch archer (born 1994)

Personal information
- Full name: Ana Gabriela Bayardo Chan
- Nickname: Gabriela
- Nationality: Dutch
- Born: 18 February 1994 (age 32) Tijuana, Baja California, Mexico
- Spouse: Mike Schloesser

Sport
- Country: Mexico (2014–2016); Netherlands (2018–present)
- Sport: Archery
- Event: Recurve
- Coached by: Mike Schloesser
Medal record
Event	1st	2nd	3rd
Olympic Games	0	1	0
World Championships	0	1	0
European Championships	1	1	0
World Cup	1	2	1
European Games	0	0	1
Central American and Caribbean Games	1	0	0
Total	3	5	2
Women's archery
Representing Netherlands
Olympic Games
Silver medal – second place	2020 Tokyo	Mixed team
World Championships
Silver medal – second place	2019 's-Hertogenbosch	Mixed team
World Field Championships
Silver medal – second place	2024 Lac La Biche	Individual recurve
European Championships
Gold medal – first place	2022 Munich	Mixed team
Silver medal – second place	2024 Essen	Team
World Cup
Gold medal – first place	2021 Lausanne	Mixed team
Silver medal – second place	2021 Paris	Mixed team
Bronze medal – third place	2022 Gwangju	Mixed team
Bronze medal – third place	2022 Paris	Mixed team
European Games
Bronze medal – third place	2019 Minsk	Individual
Representing Mexico
World Cup
Silver medal – second place	2014 Wrocław	Team
Bronze medal – third place	2016 Medellín	Team
Central American & Caribbean Games
Gold medal – first place	2014 Veracruz	Team
- Updated on 23 May 2021

Gabriela Schloesser (née Bayardo, born 18 February 1994) is a Mexican-born Dutch recurve archer from Tijuana who represented Mexico before 2016, and has represented the Netherlands since 2017. In 2021, Schloesser and Steve Wijler won the silver medal in the mixed team event at the 2020 Summer Olympics in Tokyo, Japan.

== Career ==
She competed for Mexico in the archery competition at the 2016 Summer Olympics in Rio de Janeiro, reaching the second round before being eliminated by Lisa Unruh of Germany. Following the mandatory break of 12 months in international competition for athletes switching national representation, Schloesser made her debut as a Dutch archer at the third stage of the Archery World Cup in June 2018.

In June 2019, partnered with Sjef van den Berg, Schloesser won silver medal in the mixed recurve event at the Archery World Championships in 's-Hertogenbosch, losing to the South Korean duo of Lee Woo-seok and Kang Chae-young in the final. Later that month at the 2019 European Games held in Minsk, Belarus, Bayardo secured a qualification place for the 2020 Summer Olympics in Tokyo after reaching the semi-finals, becoming the first female Dutch archer to achieve an Olympic spot since 1996. Although she lost to Tatiana Andreoli of Italy in their semi-final match, Schloesser claimed bronze medal after defeating Russia's Anna Balsukova in the third-place match.

On 23 May 2021, she paired with Sjef van den Berg to claim gold medal in the recurve mixed team event during the 2021 Archery World Cup defeating the Bangladeshi duo of Diya Siddique and Ruman Shana in the final.

Schloesser and Rick van der Ven won the gold medal in the mixed team recurve event at the 2022 European Archery Championships held in Munich, Germany. She represented the Netherlands at the 2022 World Games held in Birmingham, United States.
