= 2024 European Archery Championships – Mixed team recurve =

Archery competition

Mixed team recurve at the 2024 European Archery Championships
- Location: Essen, Germany
- Dates: 7–12 May
- Competitors: 58 from 29 nations

Medalists
gold medal	Katharina Bauer; Florian Unruh	Germany
silver medal	Bryony Pitman; Conor Hall	Great Britain
bronze medal	Laura van der Winkel; Steve Wijler	Netherlands

The mixed team recurve competition at the 2024 European Archery Championships took place from 7 to 12 May in Essen, Germany.

== Qualification round ==
Results after 144 arrows.

Rank	Nation	Name	Score	10+X	X
1	France	Caroline Lopez; Thomas Chirault	1361	76	23
2	Germany	Katharina Bauer; Florian Unruh	1359	74	26
3	Italy	Chiara Rebagliati; Mauro Nespoli	1356	71	20
4	Spain	Elia Canales; Andrés Temiño	1351	65	21
5	Turkey	Fatma Maraşlı; Mete Gazoz	1349	70	22
6	Netherlands	Quinty Roeffen; Senna Roos	1347	71	25
7	Ukraine	Mykhailo Usach; Veronika Marchenko	1344	71	22
8	Moldova	Alexandra Mirca; Dan Olaru	1331	60	22
9	United Kingdom	Bryony Pitman; Conor Hall	1330	62	16
10	Switzerland	Olivia Doigo; Kéziah Chabin	1328	59	21
11	Slovenia	Žana Pintarič; Žiga Ravnikar	1327	63	20
12	Denmark	Randi Degn; Oliver Staudt	1327	55	21
13	Belgium	Olena Kushniruk; Theo Carbonetti	1324	56	20
14	Czech Republic	Marie Horáčková; Richard Krejčí	1321	58	17
15	Georgia	Medea Gvinchidze; Aleksandre Machavariani	1312	50	17
16	Estonia	Reena Parnat; Martin Rist	1312	47	17
17	Israel	Mikaella Moshe; Roy Dror	1310	55	17
18	Austria	Elisabeth Straka; Christian Zwetti	1308	48	15
19	Poland	Klaudia Plaza; Oskar Kasprowski	1307	52	15
20	Sweden	Christine Bjerendal; Jacob Mosén	1305	49	19
21	Slovakia	Denisa Baránková; Daniel Medveczky	1302	52	12
22	Bulgaria	Dobromira Danailova; Ivan Banchev	1297	49	13
23	Azerbaijan	Yaylagul Ramazanova; Mahammadali Aliyev	1295	45	16
24	Greece	Evangelia Psarra; Panagiotis Themelis	1290	40	10
25	Ireland	Rowanna Hanlon; Carl McCaffrey	1285	41	10
26	Romania	Mădălina Amăistroaie; Mario Țîmpu	1274	30	9
27	Portugal	Milana Tkachenko; Nuno Carneiro	1273	43	17
28	Finland	Iida Tukiainen; Antti Tekoniemi	1247	36	13
29	Lithuania	Paulina Ramanauskaitė; Dalius Mačernius	1244	29	9

== Final round ==
Semifinals
9	United Kingdom	5	37	36	35	34	19+
4	Turkey	4	35	35	36	36	19
6	Netherlands	1	37	38	35
2	Germany	5	37	40	36

Finals
9	United Kingdom	2	35	35	38	36
2	Germany	6	36	35	38	38
Third place
4	Turkey	1	37	36	34
6	Netherlands	5	37	38	35

== Elimination round ==
=== Section 1 ===
1/12 finals
1	France
Bye
17	Israel	5	38	38	35	37
16	Estonia	3	26	34	38	37
9	United Kingdom	5	39	36	37	36	20
24	Greece	4	34	33	39	37	17
Bye
8	Moldova
5	Turkey
Bye
21	Slovakia	5	36	36	38	36	20
12	Croatia	4	38	37	35	35	18
13	Belgium	3	34	33	40	35
20	Sweden	5	34	36	34	38
Bye
4	Spain

1/8 finals
1	France	5	38	36	39
17	Israel	1	37	36	37
9	United Kingdom	5	34	36	38	36	19
8	Moldova	4	36	35	37	39	16
5	Turkey	6	36	40	37	38
21	Slovakia	2	37	35	35	31
20	Sweden	1	37	34	30
4	Spain	5	37	38	37

Quarterfinals
1	France	3	38	37	37	37
9	United Kingdom	5	38	37	37	39
5	Turkey	5	37	38	39	38	20
4	Spain	4	36	39	36	39	18

Semifinals
9	United Kingdom	5	37	36	35	34	19+
4	Turkey	4	35	35	36	36	19

=== Section 2 ===
1/12 finals
3	Italy
Bye
19	Poland	1	36	35	36
14	Czech Republic	5	36	38	38
11	Slovenia	5	36	39	34	36
22	Bulgaria	3	34	39	39	35
Bye
6	Netherlands
7	Ukraine
Bye
23	Azerbaijan	6	35	35	36	36
10	Switzerland	2	34	38	35	34
15	Georgia	5	38	35	36	34	20
18	Austria	4	34	36	36	34	18
Bye
2	Germany

1/8 finals
3	Italy	5	38	36	38	38	19
14	Czech Republic	4	40	39	37	37	18
11	Slovenia	3	34	35	37	35
6	Netherlands	5	34	39	35	38
7	Ukraine	6	38	37	36
23	Azerbaijan	0	34	34	34
15	Georgia	0	37	35	37
2	Germany	6	38	38	39

Quarterfinals
3	Italy	1	36	37	37
6	Netherlands	5	37	38	37
7	Ukraine	4	36	38	39	34	19
2	Germany	5	40	37	38	40	20

Semifinals
6	Netherlands	1	37	38	35
2	Germany	5	37	40	36
