= Ley, Moselle =

Ley
- Commune
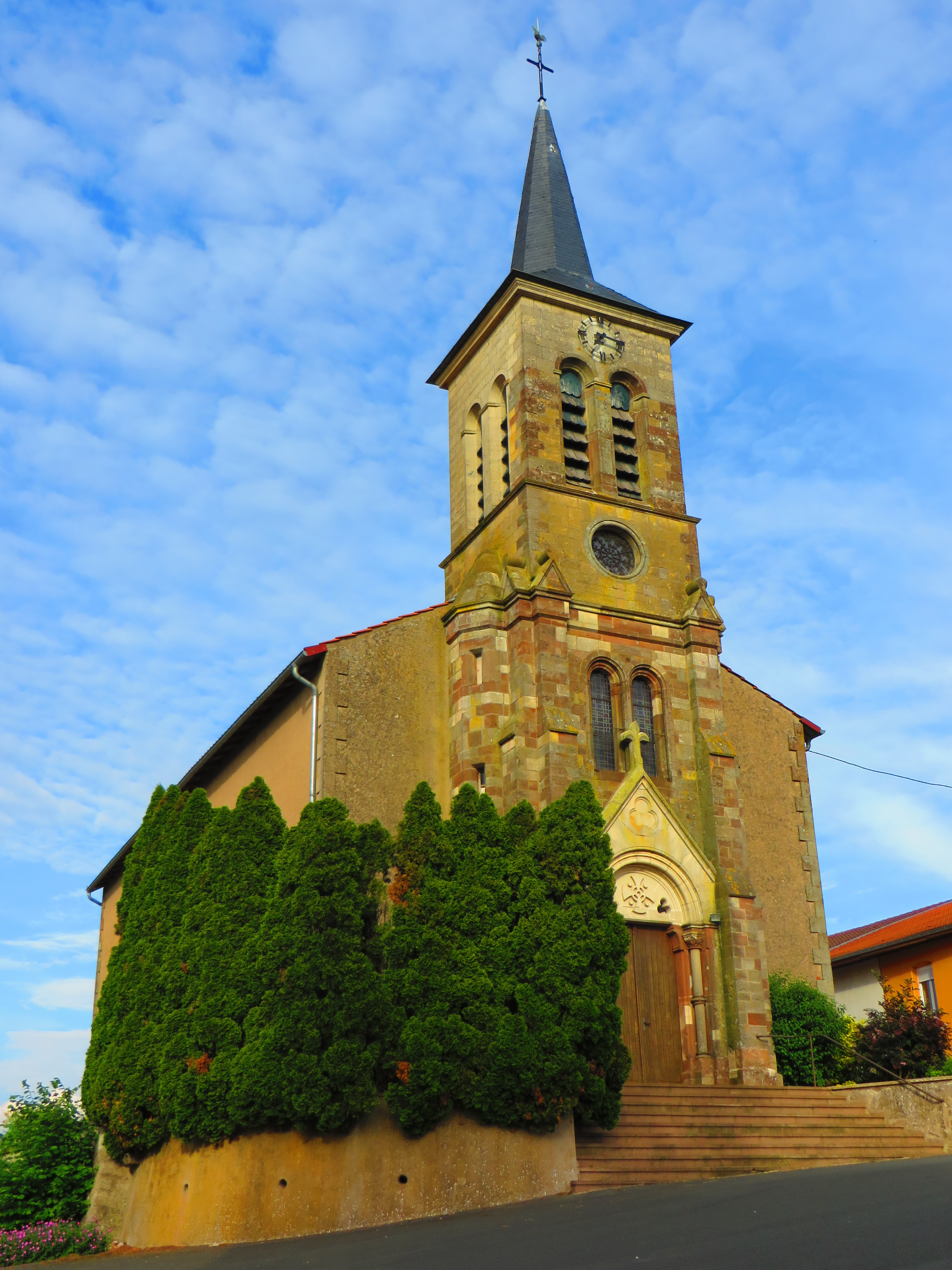
- The church in Ley

- Coat of arms
- Location of Ley
- Location within France Location within Grand Est
- Coordinates: 48°44′11″N 6°39′26″E
- Country: France
- Region: Grand Est
- Department: Moselle
- Arrondissement: Sarrebourg-Château-Salins
- Canton: Le Saulnois
- Intercommunality: CC du Saulnois

Government
  - Mayor (2020–2026): Marie-Christine Fouquet
- Area^{1}: 6.13 km^{2} (2.37 sq mi)
- Elevation: 225 m (738 ft)
- Highest elevation: 264 m (866 ft)
- Lowest elevation: 202 m (663 ft)
- Population (2023): 109
  - Density: 17.8/km^{2} (46.1/sq mi)
- Time zone: UTC+01:00 (CET)
  - Summer (DST): UTC+02:00 (CEST)
- INSEE/Postal code: 57397 /57810
- ^{1} French Land Register data, which excludes lakes, ponds, glaciers > 1 km^{2} (0.386 sq mi or 247 acres) and river estuaries.

Ley (French pronunciation: [lɛ]; German: Leyen) is a commune in the Moselle department in Grand Est in north-eastern France.

== See also ==
- Communes of the Moselle department
