= 2024 European Archery Championships – Women's individual compound =

Women's individual compound at the 2024 European Archery Championships
- Location: Essen, Germany
- Dates: 7–11 May
- Competitors: 47 from 22 nations

Medalists
gold medal	Ella Gibson	Great Britain
silver medal	Elisa Roner	Italy
bronze medal	Hazal Burun	Turkey

The women's individual compound competition at the 2024 European Archery Championships was held from 7 to 11 May 2024 in Essen, Germany.

== Qualification round ==
After 72 arrows:

Rank	Name	Nation	Score	10+X	X
1	Andrea Muñoz	Spain	707	59	24
2	Mariya Shkolna	Luxembourg	703	55	22
3	Ella Gibson	United Kingdom	702	54	34
4	Sophie Dodémont	France	702	54	18
5	Elisa Roner	Italy	701	54	25
6	Sanne de Laat	Netherlands	698	53	18
7	Marcella Tonioli	Italy	698	51	24
8	Ayşe Bera Süzer	Turkey	697	51	18
9	Hazal Burun	Turkey	696	50	23
10	Begüm Yuva	Turkey	696	49	15
11	Layla Annison	United Kingdom	695	49	16
12	Amanda Mlinarić	Croatia	692	48	21
13	Katharina Raab	Germany	692	45	16
14	Meeri-Marita Paas	Estonia	692	45	16
15	Alyssia Chambraud	France	691	46	20
16	Satu Nisula	Finland	691	45	18
17	Lisell Jäätma	Estonia	690	43	10
18	Olha Khomutovska	Ukraine	689	44	22
19	Grace Chappell	United Kingdom	689	44	19
20	Viktoriia Diakova	Austria	689	43	14
21	Candice Cadronet	France	686	40	11
22	Ricarda Lukancic	Austria	686	39	21
23	Maris Tetsmann	Estonia	685	41	8
24	Sarah Prieels	Belgium	684	39	13
25	Kseniia Shkliar	Ukraine	683	38	16
26	Ida Karlsson	Sweden	682	40	13
27	Marie Marquardt	Germany	682	39	16
28	Andrea Nicole Moccia	Italy	682	39	12
29	Inga Timinskienė	Lithuania	681	43	16
30	Małgorzata Kapusta	Poland	680	41	20
31	Kseniya Markitantova	Poland	680	39	14
32	Yulia Stepura	Ukraine	679	42	12
33	Maria-Joao Ribeiro	Portugal	679	37	9
34	Paula Díaz Morillas	Spain	678	41	18
35	Romi Maymon	Israel	678	36	16
36	Alexa Misis	Spain	676	35	14
37	Jennifer Walter	Germany	673	33	13
38	Jaqueline Ringström	Sweden	673	29	10
39	Rita Pereira	Portugal	672	34	12
40	Anna María Alfreðsdóttir	Iceland	671	34	13
41	Petra Kočutová	Slovakia	670	33	16
42	Myriam Hasler	Switzerland	670	31	12
43	Sandra Jankowska	Poland	668	33	15
44	Eva-Maria Seidel	Austria	665	31	11
45	Freyja Dís Benediktsdóttir	Iceland	663	29	12
46	Lucia Kočutová	Slovakia	653	26	9
47	Þórdís Unnur Bjarkadóttir	Iceland	652	18	3

== Final round ==
Quarterfinals
17	(Estonia) Lisell Jäätma	147
9	(Turkey) Hazal Burun	149
5	(Italy) Elisa Roner	148
13	(Germany) Katharina Raab	143
3	(United Kingdom) Ella Gibson	146
11	(United Kingdom) Layla Annison	144
7	(Italy) Marcella Tonioli	143
2	(Luxembourg) Mariya Shkolna	149

Semifinals
9	(Turkey) Hazal Burun	146
5	(Italy) Elisa Roner	149
3	(United Kingdom) Ella Gibson	148
2	(Luxembourg) Mariya Shkolna	141

Finals
5	(Italy) Elisa Roner	144^{9}
3	(United Kingdom) Ella Gibson	144^{10}
Third place
9	(Turkey) Hazal Burun	146
2	(Luxembourg) Mariya Shkolna	142

== Elimination round ==
=== Section 1 ===
Round of 48
1	(Spain) Andrea Muñoz
Bye
33	(Portugal) Maria-Joao Ribeiro	139
32	(Ukraine) Yulia Stepura	140
17	(Estonia) Lisell Jäätma
Bye
Bye
16	(Finland) Satu Nisula
9	(Turkey) Hazal Burun
Bye
41	(Slovakia) Petra Kočutová	144
24	(Belgium) Sarah Prieels	139
25	(Ukraine) Kseniia Shkliar	144
40	(Iceland) Anna María Alfreðsdóttir	136
Bye
8	(Turkey) Ayşe Bera Süzer

Round of 32
1	(Spain) Andrea Muñoz	145^{10}
32	(Ukraine) Yulia Stepura	145^{9}
17	(Estonia) Lisell Jäätma	143
16	(Finland) Satu Nisula	139
9	(Turkey) Hazal Burun	142
41	(Slovakia) Petra Kočutová	141
25	(Ukraine) Kseniia Shkliar	140
8	(Turkey) Ayşe Bera Süzer	143

Round of 16
1	(Spain) Andrea Muñoz	143
17	(Estonia) Lisell Jäätma	148
9	(Turkey) Hazal Burun	148
8	(Turkey) Ayşe Bera Süzer	144

Quarter-finals
17	(Estonia) Lisell Jäätma	147
9	(Turkey) Hazal Burun	149

=== Section 2 ===
Round of 48
5	(Italy) Elisa Roner
Bye
37	(Germany) Jennifer Walter	141^{10}
28	(Italy) Andrea Nicole Moccia	141^{10+}
21	(France) Candice Cadronet	144
44	(Austria) Eva-Maria Seidel	140
Bye
12	(Croatia) Amanda Mlinarić
13	(Germany) Katharina Raab
Bye
45	(Iceland) Freyja Dís Benediktsdóttir	96
20	(Austria) Viktoriia Diakova	142
29	(Lithuania) Inga Timinskienė	144
36	(Spain) Alexa Misis	145
Bye
4	(France) Sophie Dodémont

Round of 32
5	(Italy) Elisa Roner	147
28	(Italy) Andrea Nicole Moccia	142
21	(France) Candice Cadronet	141
12	(Croatia) Amanda Mlinarić	144
13	(Germany) Katharina Raab	144
20	(Austria) Viktoriia Diakova	141
36	(Spain) Alexa Misis	146
4	(France) Sophie Dodémont	144

Round of 16
5	(Italy) Elisa Roner	146
12	(Croatia) Amanda Mlinarić	144
13	(Germany) Katharina Raab	146
36	(Spain) Alexa Misis	144

Quarter-finals
5	(Italy) Elisa Roner	148
13	(Germany) Katharina Raab	143

=== Section 3 ===
Round of 48
3	(United Kingdom) Ella Gibson
Bye
35	(Israel) Romi Maymon	134
30	(Poland) Małgorzata Kapusta	140
19	(United Kingdom) Grace Chappell	146
46	(Slovakia) Lucia Kočutová	138
Bye
14	(Estonia) Meeri-Marita Paas
11	(United Kingdom) Layla Annison
Bye
43	(Poland) Sandra Jankowska	138
22	(Austria) Ricarda Lukancic	130
27	(Germany) Marie Marquardt	139
38	(Sweden) Jaqueline Ringström	144
Bye
6	(Netherlands) Sanne de Laat

Round of 32
3	(United Kingdom) Ella Gibson	148
30	(Poland) Małgorzata Kapusta	142
19	(United Kingdom) Grace Chappell	142^{8}
14	(Estonia) Meeri-Marita Paas	142^{10}
11	(United Kingdom) Layla Annison	146
43	(Poland) Sandra Jankowska	138
38	(Sweden) Jaqueline Ringström	140
6	(Netherlands) Sanne de Laat	143

Round of 16
3	(United Kingdom) Ella Gibson	144
14	(Estonia) Meeri-Marita Paas	143
11	(United Kingdom) Layla Annison	146
6	(Netherlands) Sanne de Laat	142

Quarter-finals
3	(United Kingdom) Ella Gibson	146
11	(United Kingdom) Layla Annison	144

=== Section 4 ===
Round of 48
7	(Italy) Marcella Tonioli
Bye
39	(Portugal) Rita Pereira	139^{9}
26	(Sweden) Ida Karlsson	139^{10}
23	(Estonia) Maris Tetsmann	146
42	(Switzerland) Myriam Hasler	135
Bye
10	(Turkey) Begüm Yuva
15	(France) Alyssia Chambraud
Bye
47	(Iceland) Þórdís Unnur Bjarkadóttir	140
18	(Ukraine) Olha Khomutovska	144
31	(Poland) Kseniya Markitantova	140
34	(Spain) Paula Díaz Morillas	139
Bye
2	(Luxembourg) Mariya Shkolna

Round of 32
7	(Italy) Marcella Tonioli	147
26	(Sweden) Ida Karlsson	142
23	(Estonia) Maris Tetsmann	132
10	(Turkey) Begüm Yuva	146
15	(France) Alyssia Chambraud	147
18	(Ukraine) Olha Khomutovska	142
31	(Poland) Kseniya Markitantova	137
2	(Luxembourg) Mariya Shkolna	143

Round of 16
7	(Italy) Marcella Tonioli	145
10	(Turkey) Begüm Yuva	143
15	(France) Alyssia Chambraud	146
2	(Luxembourg) Mariya Shkolna	147

Quarter-finals
7	(Italy) Marcella Tonioli	143
2	(Luxembourg) Mariya Shkolna	149
