= 2024 European Archery Championships – Men's individual compound =

Archery competition

Men's individual compound at the 2024 European Archery Championships
- Location: Essen, Germany
- Dates: 7–11 May
- Competitors: 70 from 30 nations

Medalists
gold medal	Mathias Fullerton	Denmark
silver medal	Shamai Yamrom	Israel
bronze medal	Mike Schloesser	Netherlands

The men's individual compound competition at the 2024 European Archery Championships was held from 7 to 11 May 2024 in Essen, Germany. The event was part of the 2024 European Outdoor Championships, held in Essen from 7 to 12 May, with the compound finals staged at the Zollverein venue.

Mathias Fullerton of Denmark won the gold medal, defeating Israel's Shamai Yamrom 147–144 in the final. Mike Schloesser of the Netherlands won the bronze medal by defeating Turkey's Emircan Haney 148–147.

== Qualification round ==
After 72 arrows:

Rank	Name	Country	Score	10+X	X
1	Mike Schloesser	Netherlands	714	66	45
2	Shamai Yamrom	Israel	712	64	25
3	Emircan Haney	Turkey	711	63	35
4	Batuhan Akçaoğlu	Turkey	708	60	31
5	Mathias Fullerton	Denmark	707	60	35
6	Nico Wiener	Austria	707	59	32
7	Jozef Bošanský	Slovakia	707	59	31
8	Kai Thomas-Prause	United Kingdom	706	58	24
9	Robin Jäätma	Estonia	706	60	33
10	Michea Godano	Italy	705	59	29
11	Matus Durny	Slovakia	704	57	26
12	Gilles Seywert	Luxembourg	704	56	25
13	Yağız Sezgin	Turkey	704	56	22
14	Jonas Grigaravičius	Lithuania	703	55	22
15	Federico Pagnoni	Italy	703	55	19
16	Ajay Scott	United Kingdom	702	54	30
17	Thomas Preisser	Austria	702	54	26
18	Victor Bouleau	France	701	57	26
19	Lukasz Przybylski	Poland	701	53	23
20	François Dubois	France	700	55	28
21	Aljaž Matija Brenk	Slovenia	700	52	25
22	Jay Tjin-A-Djie	Netherlands	700	52	17
23	Yiftach Hadar	Israel	697	50	17
24	Nicklas Bredal Bryld	Denmark	696	51	22
25	Jere Forsberg	Finland	696	49	23
26	Pavel Zaoral	Czech Republic	696	49	19
27	Rasmus Bramsen	Denmark	695	49	20
28	Quentin Baraër	France	695	48	21
29	Michael Matzner	Austria	695	48	21
30	Sebastian Hamdorf	Germany	695	48	19
31	Jacob Benschjöld	Sweden	695	47	18
32	Henning Luepkemann	Germany	694	48	30
33	Staš Modic	Slovenia	694	48	24
34	Quentin Croes	Belgium	693	48	18
35	Alexander Kullberg	Sweden	693	46	12
36	Mick Fleurinck	Belgium	692	49	24
37	Ramon Lopez	Spain	692	46	21
38	Sil Pater	Netherlands	692	46	20
39	Cláudio Alves	Portugal	692	46	14
40	Domagoj Buden	Croatia	692	45	14
41	László Szijártó	Hungary	691	54	30
42	Carlos Resende	Portugal	691	46	12
43	Gergő Elekes	Hungary	691	45	18
44	Martin Vanek	Czech Republic	691	45	15
45	Adam Carpenter	United Kingdom	691	45	12
46	Vitalii Vdovenko	Ukraine	690	45	17
47	Roman Häfelfinger	Switzerland	690	44	20
48	Marco Bruno	Italy	688	46	24
49	Przemysław Konecki	Poland	688	44	22
50	Dimitrios-Konstantinos Drakiotis	Greece	687	42	14
51	Rui Pereira Baptista	Portugal	687	39	13
52	Matti Tella	Finland	686	44	18
53	Antti Peltoniemi	Finland	686	44	15
54	Rafał Dobrowolski	Poland	686	44	14
55	Marcel Pavlik	Slovakia	685	43	23
56	Athanasios Kostopoulos	Greece	683	40	21
57	Stavros Koumertas	Greece	683	38	18
58	Ruven Flüß	Germany	682	45	22
59	Daniil Nedelko	Ukraine	680	39	8
60	Victor Canalejas Tejero	Switzerland	680	36	17
61	Marius Grigaravičius	Lithuania	678	33	7
62	Stefan Zikic	Serbia	675	34	14
63	Lorcan Crean	Ireland	670	30	12
64	Samuel Trygvason Petersen	Faroe Islands	668	34	9
65	Tim Jevšnik	Slovenia	666	37	15
66	Sviatoslav Karpenko	Ukraine	665	27	12
67	Alfreð Birgisson	Iceland	654	23	4
68	Rolandas Baranauskas	Lithuania	652	24	13
69	James O'Neill	Ireland	644	24	8
70	Jógvan Niclasen	Faroe Islands	635	19	9

== Final round ==
Quarterfinals
1	(Netherlands) Mike Schloesser	150
40	(Croatia) Domagoj Buden	149
5	(Denmark) Mathias Fullerton	150
13	(Turkey) Yağız Sezgin	148
3	(Turkey) Emircan Haney	146
6	(Austria) Nico Wiener	145
7	(Slovakia) Jozef Bošanský	147
2	(Israel) Shamai Yamrom	150

Semifinals
1	(Netherlands) Mike Schloesser	149
5	(Denmark) Mathias Fullerton	150
3	(Turkey) Emircan Haney	147
2	(Israel) Shamai Yamrom	148

Finals
5	(Denmark) Mathias Fullerton	147
2	(Israel) Shamai Yamrom	144
Third place
1	(Netherlands) Mike Schloesser	148
3	(Turkey) Emircan Haney	147

== Elimination round ==
=== Section 1 ===
1/48 Round
1	(Netherlands) Mike Schloesser
Bye
33	(Slovenia) Staš Modic
Bye
Bye
32	(Germany) Henning Luepkemann
17	(Austria) Thomas Preisser
Bye
65	(Slovenia) Tim Jevšnik	148^{10}
48	(Italy) Marco Bruno	148^{10+}
49	(Poland) Przemysław Konecki	143
64	(Faroe Islands) Samuel Trygvason Petersen	136
Bye
16	(United Kingdom) Ajay Scott

1/24 Round
1	(Netherlands) Mike Schloesser
Bye
33	(Slovenia) Staš Modic	142^{10}
32	(Germany) Henning Luepkemann	142^{9}
17	(Austria) Thomas Preisser	143
48	(Italy) Marco Bruno	144
49	(Poland) Przemysław Konecki	145
16	(United Kingdom) Ajay Scott	142

1/16 Round
1	(Netherlands) Mike Schloesser	147
33	(Slovenia) Staš Modic	145
48	(Italy) Marco Bruno	149
49	(Poland) Przemysław Konecki	144

1/8 Round
1	(Netherlands) Mike Schloesser	150
48	(Italy) Marco Bruno	145

=== Section 2 ===
1/48 Round
9	(Estonia) Robin Jäätma
Bye
57	(Greece) Stavros Koumertas	143^{10}
56	(Greece) Athanasios Kostopoulos	143^{9}
41	(Hungary) László Szijártó
Bye
Bye
24	(Denmark) Nicklas Bredal Bryld
25	(Finland) Jere Forsberg
Bye
Bye
40	(Croatia) Domagoj Buden
Bye
8	(United Kingdom) Kai Thomas-Prause

1/24 Round
9	(Estonia) Robin Jäätma	148
57	(Greece) Stavros Koumertas	142
41	(Hungary) László Szijártó	144
24	(Denmark) Nicklas Bredal Bryld	140
25	(Finland) Jere Forsberg	141
40	(Croatia) Domagoj Buden	147
Bye
8	(United Kingdom) Kai Thomas-Prause

1/16 Round
9	(Estonia) Robin Jäätma	146^{10}
41	(Hungary) László Szijártó	146^{10+}
40	(Croatia) Domagoj Buden	145
8	(United Kingdom) Kai Thomas-Prause	144

1/8 Round
41	(Hungary) László Szijártó	144
40	(Croatia) Domagoj Buden	148

=== Section 3 ===
1/48 Round
5	(Denmark) Mathias Fullerton
Bye
37	(Spain) Ramon Lopez
Bye
Bye
28	(France) Quentin Baraër
21	(Slovenia) Aljaž Matija Brenk
Bye
69	(Republic of Ireland) James O'Neill	133
44	(Czech Republic) Martin Vanek	141
53	(Finland) Antti Peltoniemi	142
60	(Switzerland) Victor Canalejas Tejero	141
Bye
12	(Luxembourg) Gilles Seywert

1/24 Round
5	(Denmark) Mathias Fullerton
Bye
37	(Spain) Ramon Lopez	146
28	(France) Quentin Baraër	147
21	(Slovenia) Aljaž Matija Brenk	149
44	(Czech Republic) Martin Vanek	139
53	(Finland) Antti Peltoniemi	140
12	(Luxembourg) Gilles Seywert	146

1/16 Round
5	(Denmark) Mathias Fullerton	149
28	(France) Quentin Baraër	145
21	(Slovenia) Aljaž Matija Brenk	147
12	(Luxembourg) Gilles Seywert	144

1/8 Round
5	(Denmark) Mathias Fullerton	150
21	(Slovenia) Aljaž Matija Brenk	147

=== Section 4 ===
1/48 Round
13	(Turkey) Yağız Sezgin
Bye
61	(Lithuania) Marius Grigaravičius	142
52	(Finland) Matti Tella	144
45	(United Kingdom) Adam Carpenter	148
68	(Lithuania) Rolandas Baranauskas	139
Bye
20	(France) François Dubois
29	(Austria) Michael Matzner
Bye
Bye
36	(Belgium) Mick Fleurinck
Bye
4	(Turkey) Batuhan Akçaoğlu

1/24 Round
13	(Turkey) Yağız Sezgin	142
52	(Finland) Matti Tella	138
45	(United Kingdom) Adam Carpenter	143
20	(France) François Dubois	144
29	(Austria) Michael Matzner	143^{9}
36	(Belgium) Mick Fleurinck	143^{10}
Bye
4	(Turkey) Batuhan Akçaoğlu

1/16 Round
13	(Turkey) Yağız Sezgin	148
20	(France) François Dubois	138
36	(Belgium) Mick Fleurinck	142
4	(Turkey) Batuhan Akçaoğlu	146

1/8 Round
13	(Turkey) Yağız Sezgin	148
4	(Turkey) Batuhan Akçaoğlu	146

=== Section 5 ===
1/48 Round
3	(Turkey) Emircan Haney
Bye
35	(Sweden) Alexander Kullberg
Bye
Bye
30	(Germany) Sebastian Hamdorf
19	(Poland) Łukasz Przybylski
Bye
67	(Iceland) Alfreð Birgisson	139
46	(Ukraine) Vitalii Vdovenko	138
51	(Portugal) Rui Pereira Baptista	138
62	(Serbia) Stefan Zikic	137
Bye
14	(Lithuania) Jonas Grigaravičius

1/24 Round
3	(Turkey) Emircan Haney
Bye
35	(Sweden) Alexander Kullberg	139
30	(Germany) Sebastian Hamdorf	143
19	(Poland) Łukasz Przybylski	142
67	(Iceland) Alfreð Birgisson	130
51	(Portugal) Rui Pereira Baptista	139
14	(Lithuania) Jonas Grigaravičius	147

1/16 Round
3	(Turkey) Emircan Haney	146
30	(Germany) Sebastian Hamdorf	142
19	(Poland) Łukasz Przybylski	146
14	(Lithuania) Jonas Grigaravičius	144

1/8 Round
3	(Turkey) Emircan Haney	149
19	(Poland) Łukasz Przybylski	148

=== Section 6 ===
1/48 Round
11	(Slovakia) Matus Durny
Bye
59	(Ukraine) Daniil Nedelko	140
54	(Poland) Rafał Dobrowolski	147
43	(Hungary) Gergő Elekes	143
70	(Faroe Islands) Jógvan Niclasen	134
Bye
22	(Netherlands) Jay Tjin-A-Djie
27	(Denmark) Rasmus Bramsen
Bye
Bye
38	(Netherlands) Sil Pater
Bye
6	(Austria) Nico Wiener

1/24 Round
11	(Slovakia) Matus Durny	149
54	(Poland) Rafał Dobrowolski	144
43	(Hungary) Gergő Elekes	144
22	(Netherlands) Jay Tjin-A-Djie	138
27	(Denmark) Rasmus Bramsen	142
38	(Netherlands) Sil Pater	145
Bye
6	(Austria) Nico Wiener

1/16 Round
11	(Slovakia) Matus Durny	144
43	(Hungary) Gergő Elekes	146
38	(Netherlands) Sil Pater	145
6	(Austria) Nico Wiener	147

1/8 Round
43	(Hungary) Gergő Elekes	147
6	(Austria) Nico Wiener	149

=== Section 7 ===
1/48 Round
7	(Slovakia) Jozef Bošanský
Bye
39	(Portugal) Cláudio Alves
Bye
Bye
26	(Czech Republic) Pavel Zaoral
23	(Israel) Yiftach Hadar
Bye
Bye
42	(Portugal) Carlos Resende
55	(Slovakia) Marcel Pavlik	137
58	(Germany) Ruven Flüß	143
Bye
10	(Italy) Michea Godano

1/24 Round
7	(Slovakia) Jozef Bošanský
Bye
39	(Portugal) Cláudio Alves	143
26	(Czech Republic) Pavel Zaoral	141
23	(Israel) Yiftach Hadar	142
42	(Portugal) Carlos Resende	138
58	(Germany) Ruven Flüß	141
10	(Italy) Michea Godano	143

1/16 Round
7	(Slovakia) Jozef Bošanský	145
39	(Portugal) Cláudio Alves	140
23	(Israel) Yiftach Hadar	143
10	(Italy) Michea Godano	144

1/8 Round
7	(Slovakia) Jozef Bošanský	147
10	(Italy) Michea Godano	144

=== Section 8 ===
1/48 Round
15	(Italy) Federico Pagnoni
Bye
63	(Republic of Ireland) Lorcan Crean	127
50	(Greece) Dimitrios-Konstantinos Drakiotis	144
47	(Switzerland) Roman Häfelfinger	141
66	(Ukraine) Sviatoslav Karpenko	145
Bye
18	(France) Victor Bouleau
31	(Sweden) Jacob Benschjöld
Bye
Bye
34	(Belgium) Quentin Croes
Bye
2	(Israel) Shamai Yamrom

1/24 Round
15	(Italy) Federico Pagnoni	146^{10}
50	(Greece) Dimitrios-Konstantinos Drakiotis	146^{9}
66	(Ukraine) Sviatoslav Karpenko	143
18	(France) Victor Bouleau	142
31	(Sweden) Jacob Benschjöld	143
34	(Belgium) Quentin Croes	142
Bye
2	(Israel) Shamai Yamrom

1/16 Round
15	(Italy) Federico Pagnoni	148
66	(Ukraine) Sviatoslav Karpenko	142
31	(Sweden) Jacob Benschjöld	143
2	(Israel) Shamai Yamrom	149

1/8 Round
15	(Italy) Federico Pagnoni	146^{10}
2	(Israel) Shamai Yamrom	146^{10+}
