= 2024 European Archery Championships – Mixed team compound =

Archery competition

Mixed team compound at the 2024 European Archery Championships
- Location: Essen, Germany
- Dates: 7–11 May
- Competitors: 44 from 22 nations
- Teams: 22

Medalists
gold medal	Sanne de Laat; Mike Schloesser	Netherlands
silver medal	Amanda Mlinarić; Domagoj Buden	Croatia
bronze medal	Ayşe Bera Süzer; Emircan Haney	Turkey

The mixed team compound competition at the 2024 European Archery Championships took place from 7 to 11 May in Essen, Germany.

== Qualification round ==
Results after 144 arrows.

Rank	Nation	Name	Score	10+X	X
1	Netherlands	Sanne de Laat; Mike Schloesser	1412	119	63
2	Turkey	Ayşe Bera Süzer; Emircan Haney	1408	114	53
3	United Kingdom	Ella Gibson; Kai Thomas-Prause	1408	112	58
4	Luxembourg	Mariya Shokolna; Gilles Seywert	1408	111	47
5	Italy	Elisa Roner; Michea Godano	1406	113	54
6	France	Sophie Dodemont; Victor Bouleau	1403	111	44
7	Spain	Andrea Muñoz; Ramon Lopez	1399	105	45
8	Estonia	Meeri-Marita Paas; Robin Jäätma	1398	105	49
9	Austria	Viktoriya Dyakova; Nico Wiener	1396	102	46
10	Israel	Romi Maymon; Shamai Yamrom	1390	100	41
11	Finland	Satu Nisula; Jere Forsberg	1387	94	41
12	Germany	Katharina Raab; Sebastian Hamdorf	1387	93	35
13	Lithuania	Inga Timinskienė; Jonas Grigaravičius	1384	98	38
14	Croatia	Amanda Mlinarić; Domagoj Buden	1384	93	35
15	Poland	Małgorzata Kapusta; Łukasz Przybylski	1381	94	43
16	Ukraine	Olha Khomutovska; Vitalii Vdovenko	1379	89	39
17	Slovakia	Petra Kočutová; Jozef Bošanský	1377	92	47
18	Belgium	Sarah Prieels; Quentin Croes	1377	87	31
19	Sweden	Ida Karlsson; Jacob Benschjöld	1377	87	31
20	Portugal	Maria João Ribeiro; Cláudio Alves	1371	83	23
21	Switzerland	Myriam Hasler; Roman Häfelfinger	1360	75	32
22	Iceland	Anna Maria Alfreðsdóttir; Alfreð Birgisson	1325	57	17

== Elimination round ==
1/12 finals
17	Slovakia	151
16	Ukraine	153
21	Switzerland	149
12	Germany	151
13	Lithuania	150
20	Portugal	149
19	Sweden	146
14	Croatia	152
11	Finland	151
22	Iceland	142
15	Poland	152^{18+}
18	Belgium	152^{18}

1/8 finals
1	Netherlands	160
16	Ukraine	152
9	Austria	156
8	Estonia	157
5	Italy	159
12	Germany	153
13	Lithuania	155
4	Luxembourg	157
3	United Kingdom	156
14	Croatia	158
11	Finland	156^{19}
6	France	156^{20}
7	Spain	150
10	Israel	147
15	Poland	156
2	Turkey	158

Quarterfinals
1	Netherlands	157
8	Estonia	156
5	Italy	152
4	Luxembourg	153
14	Croatia	155^{20}
6	France	155^{19}
7	Spain	155
2	Turkey	157

Semifinals
1	Netherlands	159
5	Luxembourg	156
14	Croatia	156^{20+}
2	Turkey	156^{20}

Final
1	Netherlands	159
14	Croatia	155
Third place
4	Luxembourg	153
2	Turkey	157
