= Yaylagul Ramazanova =

Azerbaijani archer (1990)

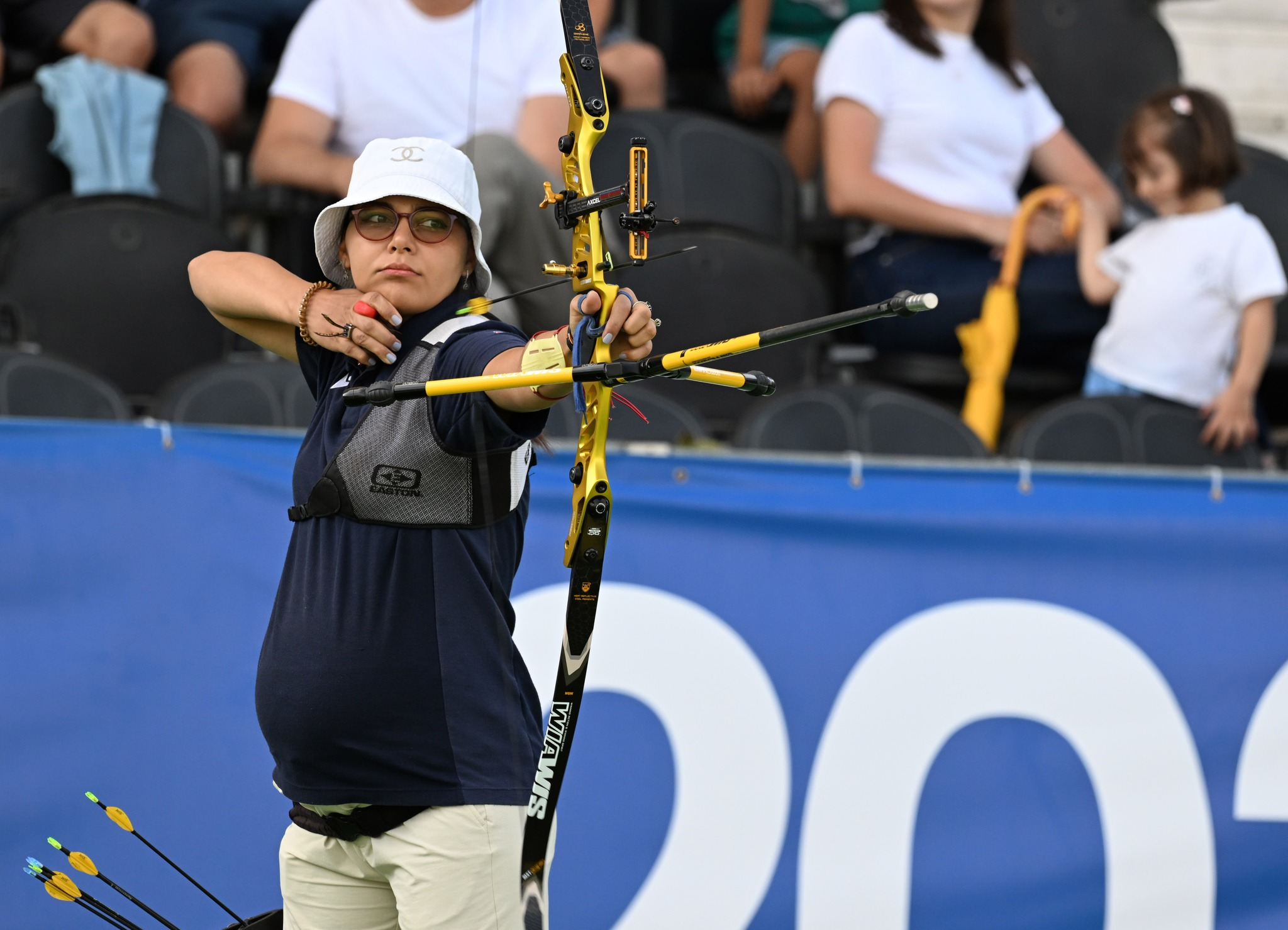
- Ramazanova in 2024

Personal information
- Native name: Yaylagül Ramazanova
- Born: 18 January 1990 (age 36)

Sport
- Sport: Archery

Yaylagul Ramazanova (Azerbaijani: Yaylagül Ramazanova; born 18 January 1990) is an Azerbaijani archer and a member of the Azerbaijan national archery team. She participated in the European Games in 2015 and 2023, the 2019 World Archery Championships, and the European Championship in 2016, 2018, 2021, and 2022. Ramazanova represented Azerbaijan at the 2024 Summer Olympics in Paris, becoming the first Azerbaijani non-naturalized athlete to secure an Olympic quota in archery for Azerbaijan. As multiple-time Azerbaijani champion, and a record-holder in the country for 70-meter archery distance, she has received the honorary title of Master of Sports of Azerbaijan.

== Biography ==
Yaylagul Ramazanova was born on 18 January 1990. She graduated from the Azerbaijan State Academy of Fine Arts, specializing in book illustration.

In June 2015, at the European Games in Baku, Ramazanova competed against Georgian athlete Khatuna Narimanidze and lost with a score of 4:6.

In June 2018, she won the Azerbaijani Championship in Baku.

At the 2022 European Archery Championships in Munich, Germany, Ramazanova secured a quota for the 2023 European Games in Kraków, Poland.

Since October 2022, her coach on the national team has been Natig Fazilov who has received the honorary titles of Honored Coach, and Master of Sports of Azerbaijan.

At the 2023 European Games, Ramazanova, along with fencer Barat Guliyev, was the flagbearer of Azerbaijan at the opening ceremony. In the competition, Ramazanova was defeated in the 1/32 round by Lithuanian athlete Paulina Ramanauskaite with a narrow score of 5:6 (the regular time ended 5:5).

In June 2024, at the final qualification stage in Antalya, Turkey, Yaylagul Ramazanova defeated Polish athlete Klaudia Plaza, securing a quota for the 2024 Summer Olympics.

Ramazanova was the first Azerbaijani athlete to start her Olympic competition on 25 July, a day before the opening ceremony. Ranked 61st globally among tournament participants, she scored 647 points in the qualification round, finishing 39th, marking her best performance of the season. On 30 July, in the 1/32 finals, Ramazanova, while seven months pregnant, clinched a victory in a tiebreak against the 26th-ranked Chinese athlete An Qixuan with a score of 6:5. Immediately after, she competed in the 1/16 finals against Michelle Kroppen of Germany, losing 2:6. Due to her pregnancy, spectators offered special support during her matches.

At the Azerbaijan Archery Championship held in Baku on 5–7 February 2025, she won the gold medal and earned the title of Azerbaijan champion.
