= Quinty Roeffen =

Dutch archer (born 2005)

Personal information
- National team: Netherlands
- Born: September 8, 2005 (age 20) Horst

Sport
- Sport: Archery
- Event: Recurve
Medal record
European Championships
Silver medal – second place	2024 Essen	Women´s Team
- Updated on 22 July 2022

Quinty Roeffen (Horst, 8 September 2005) is a Dutch recurve archer. Roeffen is the 2024 European Archery Junior Champion and won a gold medal at the 2024 Junior Indoor World Series. She is a member of the Dutch women's recurve team that won a silver medal at the 2024 European Archery Championships and qualified for the 2024 Summer Olympics.

== Career ==
Roeffen got in touch with archery while vacationing in Turkey with her family. Back home, she joined De Schutroe, a local archery club. In August 2021 she moved to National Sports Center Papendal. In 2022 the Dutch archery regulating body, Koninklijke HandboogSport Nederland, named her talent of the year. In 2023, Roeffen won the Dutch national championships in four different events. In 2024 she won a gold medal at the European Archery Junior Championship and won the Indoor Archery World Series Junior Finals event.
