= Megan Havers =

British archer (born 2007)

Personal information
- Born: 2 December 2007 (age 18) Leicester, United Kingdom

Sport
- Country: United Kingdom
- Sport: Archery
- Event: Recurve

Megan Havers (born 2 December 2007) is a British archer competing in women's recurve events. She competed in the 2024 Paris Olympics.

== Early life ==
From Leicester, England, she tried archery for the first time on a family holiday. She attended South Charnwood High School in Markfield, England. She received her GCSE results on 22 August 2024 a couple of weeks after competing at the Olympic Games and passed all her exams, apart from PE.

== Career ==
She won a bronze medal in the mixed team category at the 2023 European Youth Cup in Switzerland.

Alongside Bryony Pitman and Penny Healey, she won a silver team medal at the European Grand Prix in June 2024. In the same month, the trio qualified for the team event at the 2024 Olympic Games by finishing third at the final qualifying event in Antalya, Turkey.

In July 2024, Havers was named in the British team for the 2024 Paris Olympics. At the age of 16, she was the youngest archer selected for the Olympic Games. She also had the distinction of being the first to compete at the games, firing the first arrow in the women’s ranking round on 24 July 2024. She made it to the round of 16, before being knocked out by Lim Si-hyeon and was Britain’s best performer in the women’s individual competition. In the team event, alongside teammates Penny Healey and Bryony Pitman, they were knocked out by Germany in the round of 16.

She joked about it saying that taking her English GCSE was tougher.
