= 2024 European Archery Championships =

2024 European Championships
- Location: Essen, Germany
- Dates: 7-12 May 2024
- Competitors: 289 from 38 nations

The 2024 European Archery Championships were held from 7 to 12 May in Essen, Germany. Championships also served as qualification event for 2024 Summer Olympics.

== Medal table ==
* Host nation (Germany)

Rank	Nation	Gold	Silver	Bronze	Total
1	Turkey	2	1	3	6
2	France	2	0	2	4
3	Germany*	2	0	1	3
4	Italy	1	2	0	3
5	Netherlands	1	1	2	4
6	Great Britain	1	1	0	2
7	Denmark	1	0	1	2
8	Spain	0	2	0	2
9	Croatia	0	1	0	1
9	Israel	0	1	0	1
9	Slovenia	0	1	0	1
12	Estonia	0	0	1	1
Totals (12 entries)		10	10	10	30

== Medal summary ==
=== Recurve ===
Event	Gold	Silver	Bronze
Men's individual	Mete Gazoz; Turkey	Den Habjan Malavašič; Slovenia	Jean-Charles Valladont; France
Women's individual	Katharina Bauer; Germany	Elia Canales; Spain	Lisa Barbelin; France
Men's team	France; Baptiste Addis; Thomas Chirault; Jean-Charles Valladont	Italy; Federico Musolesi; Mauro Nespoli; Alessandro Paoli	Turkey; Berkay Akkoyun; Mete Gazoz; Berkim Tümer
Women's team	France; Lisa Barbelin; Amélie Cordeau; Caroline Lopez	Netherlands; Quinty Roeffen; Gabriela Schloesser; Laura van der Winkel	Germany; Katharina Bauer; Charline Schwarz; Elisa Tartler
Mixed team	Germany; Katharina Bauer; Florian Unruh	United Kingdom; Bryony Pitman; Conor Hall	Netherlands; Laura van der Winkel; Steve Wijler

=== Compound ===
Event	Gold	Silver	Bronze
Men's individual	Mathias Fullerton; Denmark	Shamai Yamrom; Israel	Mike Schloesser; Netherlands
Women's individual	Ella Gibson; Great Britain	Elisa Roner; Italy	Hazal Burun; Turkey
Men's team	Italy; Marco Bruno; Michea Godano; Federico Pagnoni	Turkey; Batuhan Akçaoğlu; Emircan Haney; Yağız Sezgin	Denmark; Rasmus Bramsen; Nicklas Bredal Bryld; Mathias Fullerton
Women's team	Turkey; Hazal Burun; Ayşe Bera Süzer; Begüm Yuva	Spain; Paula Díaz; Alexa Misis; Andrea Muñoz	Estonia; Lisell Jäätma; Meeri-Marita Paas; Maris Tetsmann
Mixed team	Netherlands; Sanne de Laat; Mike Schloesser	Croatia; Amanda Mlinarić; Domagoj Buden	Turkey; Ayşe Bera Süzer; Emircan Haney

== Participating countries ==
A total of 289 competitors from the national teams of the following 38 countries were registered to compete at 2024 European Championships.

- Armenia (3)
- Austria (10)
- Azerbaijan (5)
- Belgium (9)
- Bulgaria (2)
- Croatia (5)
- Czech Republic (8)
- Denmark (9)
- Spain (10)
- Estonia (8)
- Finland (9)
- France (12)
- Faroe Islands (2)
- United Kingdom (12)
- Georgia (6)
- Germany (12)
- Greece (9)
- Hungary (3)
- Ireland (8)
- Iceland (7)
- Israel (9)
- Italy (12)
- Latvia (3)
- Lithuania (8)
- Luxembourg (5)
- Moldova (4)
- Netherlands (10)
- Poland (12)
- Portugal (8)
- Romania (4)
- Slovenia (9)
- San Marino (2)
- Serbia (1)
- Switzerland (9)
- Slovakia (11)
- Sweden (9)
- Turkey (12)
- Ukraine (12)

== Olympics qualification ==
Individual athletes whose NOC has not qualified yet will participate in the Continental Qualification Tournament. Only 1 no-nominative quota place per country can qualify for Paris 2024.

Best team of the second tournament will take a quota place for Paris 2024.

Event		NOC Qualified
2024 European Continental Qualification Tournament (May 5–6)	Recurve men individual	Netherlands; Slovenia; Ukraine
2024 European Continental Qualification Tournament (May 5–6)	Recurve women individual	Austria; Estonia; Turkey
2024 European Archery Championships (May 7–12)	Recurve men's team	Italy
2024 European Archery Championships (May 7–12)	Recurve women's team	Netherlands

=== Olympic quotas ===
Nation	Men's	Women's	Total
Netherlands	1		1
Slovenia	1		1
Ukraine	1		1
Austria		1	1
Estonia		1	1
Turkey		1	1
Total: 6 countries	3	3	6
