= Archery at the 2024 Summer Olympics – Women's individual =

Women's individual at the Games of the XXXIII Olympiad
- Venue: Les Invalides
- Date: 25 July 2024 (ranking round); 30 July – 3 August 2024 (match play); 3 August 2024 (finals)
- Competitors: 64 from 40 nations

Medalists
1st place, gold medalist(s)		Lim Si-hyeon	South Korea
2nd place, silver medalist(s)		Nam Su-hyeon	South Korea
3rd place, bronze medalist(s)		Lisa Barbelin	France

The women's individual archery event is one of five archery events at the 2024 Summer Olympics. It was held at Les Invalides. There were 64 competitors from 40 nations, with nations having either 1 or 3 archers.

== Background ==
This was the 13th consecutive appearance of the event, which has been held every Games since archery returned to the Olympic program in 1972.

== Qualification ==
64 archers qualify for the women's archery events. The 12 National Olympic Committees (NOCs) that qualify for the women's team event (including the host, France) enter the 3 team members in the individual event as well. Otherwise, NOCs may qualify a maximum of 1 archer in women's individual. There are quota spots available at various tournaments, including the World Championships, multiple continental events, and a final qualification tournament. There are also two Tripartite Commission invitational spots.

== Competition format ==
As with the other archery events, the women's individual is a recurve archery event, held under the World Archery-approved 70-meter distance and rules. Competition begins with a ranking round, in which each archer shoots 72 arrows. The scores from the ranking round are used to seed the archers into a single-elimination bracket. The knockout matches used the set system introduced in 2012. Each match consists of up to 5 sets of 3 arrows per archer. The archer with the best score in each set wins the set, earning 2 points. If the score is tied, each archer receives 1 point. The first archer to 6 points wins the match. If the match is tied 5–5 after 5 sets, a single tie-breaker arrow is to be used with the closest to center winning.

== Records ==
Prior to the competition, the world and Olympic records were as follows.

- 72 arrow ranking round

World record	Kang Chae-young (KOR)	692	's-Hertogenbosch, Netherlands	10 June 2019
Olympic record	An San (KOR)	680	Tokyo, Japan	23 July 2021

The following record was established during the competition:

Date	Event	Name	Nation	Score	Record
25 July	Ranking round	Lim Si-hyeon	South Korea	694	WR, OR

== Schedule ==
All times are Central European Time (UTC+1)

The schedule for the women's individual event covers five separate days of competition.

Date	Time	Round
Thursday, 25 July 2024	9:30	Ranking round
Tuesday, 30 July 2024; Wednesday, 31 July 2024; Thursday, 1 August 2024	12:26; 18:11	1/32 finals 1/16 finals
Saturday, 3 August 2024	9:30; 13:00; 13:52; 14:33; 14:46	1/8 finals Quarter-finals; Semi-finals; Bronze medal match Gold medal match

== Results ==
=== Ranking round ===
The ranking round was held on 25 July 2024. All 64 entrants took part. Following the conclusion of the rankings round, the archers were seeded 1 to 64 in the elimination bracket. The scores will also be used to rank the women's team and mixed team events.

Rank	Archer	Nation	10s	Xs	Score
1	Lim Si-hyeon	South Korea	48	21	694 (WR)
2	Nam Su-hyeon	South Korea	44	13	688
3	Yang Xiaolei	China	34	11	673
4	Casey Kaufhold	United States	34	8	672
5	Elif Berra Gökkır	Turkey	31	10	671
6	Diananda Choirunisa	Indonesia	33	12	670
7	Michelle Kroppen	Germany	31	14	670
8	Alejandra Valencia	Mexico	34	17	669
9	Li Jiaman	China	33	7	667
10	Elisabeth Straka	Austria	30	7	667
11	Ankita Bhakat	India	30	9	666
12	Satsuki Noda	Japan	30	8	666
13	Jeon Hun-young	South Korea	31	8	664
14	Syaqiera Mashayikh	Malaysia	32	12	663
15	Chiara Rebagliati	Italy	30	11	663
16	Elia Canales	Spain	26	11	662
17	Amélie Cordeau	France	28	11	661
18	Mikaella Moshe	Israel	28	9	660
19	Ana Luiza Caetano	Brazil	28	8	660
20	Ana Paula Vázquez	Mexico	30	9	659
21	Caroline Lopez	France	28	7	659
22	Bhajan Kaur	India	25	6	659
23	Deepika Kumari	India	28	6	658
24	Ángela Ruiz	Mexico	24	10	658
25	Veronika Marchenko	Ukraine	21	6	657
26	An Qixuan	China	29	13	656
27	Katharina Bauer	Germany	25	5	656
28	Mobina Fallah	Iran	30	15	652
29	Lei Chien-ying	Chinese Taipei	25	4	652
30	Lisa Barbelin	France	21	10	652
31	Marie Horáčková	Czech Republic	26	12	651
32	Rezza Octavia	Indonesia	22	10	650
33	Virginie Chénier	Canada	27	13	649
34	Ziyodakhon Abdusattorova	Uzbekistan	22	10	649
35	Gabriela Schloesser	Netherlands	21	10	649
36	Ana Rendón	Colombia	21	3	649
37	Đỗ Thị Ánh Nguyệt	Vietnam	22	5	648
38	Catalina GNoriega	United States	20	7	648
39	Yaylagul Ramazanova	Azerbaijan	23	6	647
40	Li Tsai-chi	Chinese Taipei	21	7	646
41	Bryony Pitman	Great Britain	20	8	646
42	Reena Pärnat	Estonia	19	5	646
43	Syifa Nurafifah Kamal	Indonesia	20	6	640
44	Laura Paeglis	Australia	19	5	640
45	Charline Schwarz	Germany	21	6	639
46	Žana Pintarič	Slovenia	24	8	638
47	Mădălina Amăistroaie	Romania	16	2	637
48	Denisa Baránková	Slovakia	19	6	636
49	Megan Havers	Great Britain	22	9	635
50	Ariana Zairi	Malaysia	10	4	633
51	Alexandra Mîrca	Moldova	22	3	631
52	Penny Healey	Great Britain	18	8	631
53	Chiu Yi-ching	Chinese Taipei	22	10	628
54	Wioleta Myszor	Poland	18	4	626
55	Quinty Roeffen	Netherlands	20	7	625
56	Kirstine Danstrup Andersen	Denmark	19	8	625
57	Jennifer Mucino-Fernandez	United States	17	6	625
58	Giorgia Cesarini	San Marino	14	7	625
59	Laura van der Winkel	Netherlands	16	8	623
60	Nurul Fazil	Malaysia	15	2	622
61	Fatoumata Sylla	Guinea	16	2	619
62	Rihab Elwalid	Tunisia	11	4	593
63	Jana Ali	Egypt	14	6	573
64	Alondra Rivera	Puerto Rico	7	3	547

=== Competition bracket ===
==== Section 1 ====
Round of 64
1	Lim S-h (KOR)	6	26	28	29
64	A Rivera (PUR)	0	23	18	24
33	V Chénier (CAN)	2	24	30	23	24
32	R Octavia (INA)	6	27	26	26	25
17	A Cordeau (FRA)	7	23	28	29	29	28
48	D Baránková (SVK)	3	26	28	26	26	26
49	M Havers (GBR)	6	27	25	28
16	E Canales (ESP)	0	24	24	27
9	Li JM (CHN)	6	26	28	26
56	K D Andersen (DEN)	0	17	24	21
41	B Pitman (GBR)	6	28	27	26	30
24	Á Ruiz (MEX)	2	27	26	27	27
25	V Marchenko (UKR)	6	29	28	28	27	27
40	Li T-c (TPE)	4	26	27	30	27	27
57	J Mucino-Fernandez (USA)	2	29	24	28	25
8	A Valencia (MEX)	6	29	28	28	28

Round of 32
1	Lim S-h (KOR)	6	28	27	29
32	R Octavia (INA)	0	27	26	27
17	A Cordeau (FRA)	5^{9}	27	28	30	27	28
49	M Havers (GBR)	6^{10}	29	28	28	28	27
9	Li JM (CHN)	6	28	27	28
41	B Pitman (GBR)	0	27	26	27
25	V Marchenko (UKR)	4	28	27	25	27	27
8	A Valencia (MEX)	6	26	27	27	27	29

Round of 16
1	Lim S-h (KOR)	7	28	27	27	28
49	M Havers (GBR)	1	28	26	21	26
9	Li JM (CHN)	5^{9}	29	28	29	28	28
8	A Valencia (MEX)	6^{9+}	29	28	27	28	29

Quarter-finals
1	Lim S-h (KOR)	6	30	27	27	29	29
8	A Valencia (MEX)	4	30	27	28	28	26

==== Section 2 ====
Round of 64
5	E B Gökkır (TUR)	6	29	27	27
60	N Fazil (MAS)	0	27	22	25
37	Đỗ T A N (VIE)	5^{10}	25	26	27	27	27
28	M Fallah (IRI)	6^{X}	25	27	26	29	26
21	C Lopez (FRA)	6	21	27	28	28	28
44	L Paeglis (AUS)	4	28	29	27	26	27
53	Chiu Y-c (TPE)	0	25	27	24
12	S Noda (JPN)	6	27	29	25
13	Jeon H-y (KOR)	6	27	28	28	29
52	P Healey (GBR)	2	28	26	25	25
45	C Schwarz (GER)	6	28	26	28	25	29
20	A Vázquez (MEX)	4	28	28	26	25	28
29	Lei C-y (TPE)	7	28	27	29	28
36	A Rendón (COL)	1	26	27	27	26
61	F Sylla (GUI)	2	23	26	21	26
4	C Kaufhold (USA)	6	28	25	28	27

Round of 32
5	E B Gökkır (TUR)	6	27	28	28
28	M Fallah (IRI)	0	26	26	24
21	C Lopez (FRA)	2	27	22	27	25
12	S Noda (JPN)	6	18	26	28	26
13	Jeon H-y (KOR)	7	28	29	27	30
45	C Schwarz (GER)	1	25	29	26	26
29	Lei C-y (TPE)	7	28	28	27	27	30
4	C Kaufhold (USA)	3	26	27	29	27	27

Round of 16
5	E B Gökkır (TUR)	6	28	25	28	27	28
12	S Noda (JPN)	4	29	28	25	25	24
13	Jeon H-y (KOR)	6	27	28	28	25	28
29	Lei C-y (TPE)	4	28	26	25	29	25

Quarter-finals
5	E B Gökkır (TUR)	2	26	29	25	26
13	Jeon H-y (KOR)	6	28	28	28	28

==== Section 3 ====
Round of 64
3	Yang XL (CHN)	7	29	27	27	25	27
62	R Elwalid (TUN)	3	22	27	24	29	26
35	G Schloesser (NED)	2	25	24	27	29
30	L Barbelin (FRA)	6	25	25	29	29
19	A S Caetano (BRA)	6	26	27	27	28
46	Ž Pintarič (SLO)	2	29	25	25	27
51	A Mîrca (MDA)	0	27	23	24
14	S Mashayikh (MAS)	6	30	27	26
11	A Bhakat (IND)	4	26	29	28	27	27
54	W Myszor (POL)	6	27	26	27	29	28
43	S N Kamal (INA)	3	27	29	27	25	25
22	B Kaur (IND)	7	27	27	29	27	28
27	K Bauer (GER)	0	24	25	27
38	C GNoriega (USA)	6	27	28	28
59	L van der Winkel (NED)	1	24	24	25	28
6	D Choirunisa (INA)	7	25	29	25	29

Round of 32
3	Yang XL (CHN)	2	27	28	27	27
30	L Barbelin (FRA)	6	28	28	29	27
19	A S Caetano (BRA)	6^{9}	27	28	24	27	29
14	S Mashayikh (MAS)	5^{8}	27	28	28	27	24
54	W Myszor (POL)	0	23	26	22
22	B Kaur (IND)	6	28	29	28
38	C GNoriega (USA)	5^{8}	28	29	26	28	26
6	D Choirunisa (INA)	6^{10}	27	29	26	29	26

Round of 16
30	L Barbelin (FRA)	6	27	26	28	28
19	A S Caetano (BRA)	2	25	27	27	27
22	B Kaur (IND)	5^{8}	28	27	26	28	27
6	D Choirunisa (INA)	6^{9}	29	25	29	28	26

Quarter-finals
30	L Barbelin (FRA)	6^{10}	27	28	28	27	28
6	D Choirunisa (INA)	5^{8}	28	28	28	27	25

==== Section 4 ====
Round of 64
7	M Kroppen (GER)	7	30	26	29	26	27
58	G Cesarini (SMR)	3	26	26	26	28	25
39	Y Ramazanova (AZE)	6^{10}	22	27	26	28	26
26	An QX (CHN)	5^{9}	27	25	27	27	26
23	D Kumari (IND)	6^{9}	29	26	27	24	30
42	R Pärnat (EST)	5^{8}	28	27	27	27	27
55	Q Roeffen (NED)	6	23	29	25	28	27
10	E Straka (AUT)	4	29	30	23	27	26
15	C Rebagliati (ITA)	6^{10}	27	24	28	29	27
50	A Zairi (MAS)	5^{9}	27	25	27	28	29
47	M Amăistroaie (ROU)	7	28	25	29	25
18	M Moshe (ISR)	1	23	25	28	23
31	M Horáčková (CZE)	6	28	27	26	30
34	Z Abdusattorova (UZB)	2	22	25	28	29
63	J Ali (EGY)	1	23	25	28	28
2	Nam S-h (KOR)	7	30	29	28	29

Round of 32
7	M Kroppen (GER)	6	27	27	29	27
39	Y Ramazanova (AZE)	2	25	29	25	26
23	D Kumari (IND)	6	29	27	25	28
55	Q Roeffen (NED)	2	28	29	17	23
15	C Rebagliati (ITA)	3	26	25	28	27	26
47	M Amăistroaie (ROU)	7	29	29	26	27	28
31	M Horáčková (CZE)	3	28	24	28	29	24
2	Nam S-h (KOR)	7	28	27	28	29	29

Round of 16
7	M Kroppen (GER)	4	24	27	25	29	27
23	D Kumari (IND)	6	27	27	26	27	27
47	M Amăistroaie (ROU)	2	24	29	27	28
2	Nam S-h (KOR)	6	28	27	28	29

Quarter-finals
23	D Kumari (IND)	4	28	25	29	27	27
2	Nam S-h (KOR)	6	26	28	28	29	29

- (+) Won the shoot-off by the arrow closer to the center of the target.

== Finals ==
Semi-finals
1	Lim Si-hyeon (KOR)	6	28	26	27	29	29
13	Jeon Hun-young (KOR)	4	28	29	27	26	27
30	Lisa Barbelin (FRA)	0	27	26	28
2	Nam Su-hyeon (KOR)	6	29	27	29

Gold medal match
1	Lim Si-hyeon (KOR)	7	29	29	30	29	28
2	Nam Su-hyeon (KOR)	3	29	26	27	30	26
Bronze medal match
13	Jeon Hun-young (KOR)	4	27	29	26	29	27
30	Lisa Barbelin (FRA)	6	28	27	28	26	28
