= World and Olympic records set at the 2024 Summer Olympics =

Numerous world records and Olympic records were set in various events at the 2024 Summer Olympics in Paris. Some events, such as rowing, occur under variable weather conditions that can unfairly benefit an athlete's performance through no fault of their own. For these disciplines, there are no official records but rather Olympic best and world best times.

== Archery ==
Event	Round	Name	Nation	Score	Date	Record
Women's individual	Ranking round	Lim Si-hyeon	South Korea	694	25 July	WR
Women's team	Ranking round	Jeon Hun-young; Lim Si-hyeon; Nam Su-hyeon	South Korea	2046	25 July	OR
Mixed team	Ranking round	Kim Woo-jin; Lim Si-hyeon	South Korea	1380	25 July	OR

== Athletics ==
Event	Round	Name	Nation	Score	Date	Record
Men's 10,000 metres	Final	Joshua Cheptegei	Uganda	26:43.14	2 August	OR
Mixed 4 × 400 metres relay	Round 1	Vernon Norwood; Shamier Little; Bryce Deadmon; Kaylyn Brown	United States	3:07.41	2 August	WR
Men's decathlon	Discus throw	Lindon Victor	Grenada	53.91	3 August	ODB
Men's decathlon	Javelin throw	Niklas Kaul	Germany	77.78	3 August	ODB
Men's pole vault	Final	Armand Duplantis	Sweden	6.25 m	5 August	WR
Men's 1,500 metres	Final	Cole Hocker	United States	3:27.65	6 August	OR
Women's 3,000 metres steeplechase	Final	Winfred Yavi	Bahrain	8:52.76	6 August	OR
Men's discus throw	Final	Roje Stona	Jamaica	70.00	7 August	OR
Men's javelin throw	Final	Arshad Nadeem	Pakistan	92.97 m	8 August	OR
Women's 400 metres hurdles	Final	Sydney McLaughlin-Levrone	United States	50.37	8 August	WR
Women's 400 metres	Final	Marileidy Paulino	Dominican Republic	48.17	9 August	OR
Men's marathon	Final	Tamirat Tola	Ethiopia	2:06.26	10 August	OR
Men's 4 × 400 metres relay	Final	Christopher Bailey; Vernon Norwood; Bryce Deadmon; Rai Benjamin	United States	2:54.43	10 August	OR
Women's 1,500 metres	Final	Faith Kipyegon	Kenya	3:51.29	10 August	OR
Women's marathon	Final	Sifan Hassan	Netherlands	2:22:55	11 August	OR

- All world records (WR) are consequently Olympic records (OR).

== Canoe sprint ==
There are no world or Olympic records in canoeing due to the variability of weather conditions. Instead, there are world and Olympic best times that are taken over the standard international canoeing distances.

Event	Round	Name	Nation	Time	Date	Record
Men's C-2 500m	Heats	Liu Hao; Ji Bowen	China	1:37.40	6 Aug	OB
Women's C-2 500m	Heats	Sloan MacKenzie; Katie Bowen	Canada	1:54.16	6 Aug	OB
Men's K-4 500m	Heats	Max Lemke; Tom Liebscher-Lucz; Max Rendschmidt; Jacob Schopf	Germany	1:20.51	6 Aug	OB
Men's K-4 500m	Quarterfinal	Jackson Collins; Riley Fitzsimmons; Noah Havard; Pierre van der Westhuyzen	Australia	1:19.39	6 Aug	OB
Men's C-1 1000m	Heats	Cătălin Chirilă	Romania	3:44.75	7 Aug	OB
Men's K-4 500m	Semifinal	Jackson Collins; Riley Fitzsimmons; Noah Havard; Pierre van der Westhuyzen	Australia	1:19.22	8 Aug	OB
Women's C-2 500m	Semifinals	Xu Shixiao; Sun Mengya	China	1:53.73	9 Aug	OB
Women's C-2 500m	Semifinals	Xu Shixiao; Sun Mengya	China	1:52.81	9 Aug	OB
Men's C-1 1000m	Semifinals	Martin Fuksa	Czech Republic	3:44.69	9 Aug	OB
Men's C-1 1000m	Finals	Martin Fuksa	Czech Republic	3:43.16	9 Aug	OB
Men's K-2 500m	Semifinals	Jean van der Westhuyzen; Thomas Green	Australia	1:26.85	9 Aug	OB
Women's C-1 200m	Finals	Katie Vincent	Canada	44.12	10 Aug	WB
Women's K-1 500m	Finals	Lisa Carrington	New Zealand	1:47.36	10 Aug	OB

== Track cycling ==
Event	Round	Name	Nation	Time	Date	Record
Women's team sprint	Qualifying	Katy Marchant; Sophie Capewell; Emma Finucane	Great Britain	45.472	5 August	WR
Women's team sprint	First Round	Katy Marchant; Sophie Capewell; Emma Finucane	Great Britain	45.338	5 August	WR
Women's team sprint	Final	Katy Marchant; Sophie Capewell; Emma Finucane	Great Britain	45.186	5 August	WR
Men's team sprint	Qualifying	Harrie Lavreysen; Roy van den Berg; Jeffrey Hoogland	Netherlands	41.279	6 August	OR
Men's team sprint	First Round	Harrie Lavreysen; Roy van den Berg; Jeffrey Hoogland	Netherlands	41.191	6 August	WR
Men's team sprint	Final	Harrie Lavreysen; Roy van den Berg; Jeffrey Hoogland	Netherlands	40.949	6 August	WR
Men's team pursuit	First Round	Kelland O'Brien; Sam Welsford; Conor Leahy; Oliver Bleddyn	Australia	3:40.730	6 August	WR
Men's sprint	Qualifying	Harrie Lavreysen	Netherlands	9.088	7 August	WR
Women's sprint	Qualifying	Lea Friedrich	Germany	10.029	9 August	WR

== Modern pentathlon ==
Event	Round	Name	Nation	Time	Date	Record
Men's modern pentathlon	Laser Run	Martin Vlach	Czech Republic	9:47.46	9 August	OR
Men's modern pentathlon	Laser Run	Emiliano Hernández	Mexico	9:40.80	10 August	WR
Men's modern pentathlon	Overall	Ahmed Elgendy	Egypt	1555 pts	10 August	WR
Women's modern pentathlon	Overall	Kerenza Bryson	Great Britain	1402 pts	10 August	OR
Women's modern pentathlon	Laser Run	Laura Asadauskaitė	Lithuania	11:10.90	10 August	OR
Women's modern pentathlon	Laser Run	Anna Jurt	Switzerland	11:07.63	10 August	OR
Women's modern pentathlon	Laser Run	Blanka Guzi	Hungary	10:45.48	11 August	OR
Women's modern pentathlon	Overall	Michelle Gulyas	Hungary	1461 pts	11 August	WR

== Rowing ==
There are no world or Olympic records in rowing due to the variability of weather conditions. Instead, there are world and Olympic best times that are taken over the standard international rowing distance of 2,000 metres.

Event	Round	Name	Nation	Time	Date	Record
Men's single sculls	Semifinals	Oliver Zeidler	Germany	6:35.77	1 Aug	OB

== Shooting ==
Event	Round	Name	Nation	Score	Date	Record
Women's 10 metre air pistol	Final	Oh Ye-jin	South Korea	243.2	28 July	OR
Men's 10 metre air rifle	Final	Sheng Lihao	China	252.2	29 July	OR
Women's 10 metre air rifle	Qualification	Ban Hyo-jin	South Korea	634.5	29 July	OR
Men's trap	Final	Nathan Hales	Great Britain	48	30 July	OR
Women's trap	Final	Adriana Ruano Oliva	Guatemala	45	31 July	OR
Women's 50 metre rifle three positions	Qualification	Sagen Maddalena	United States	593-45x *	1 Aug	OR
Women's 50 metre rifle three positions	Qualification	Zhang Qiongyue	China	593-40x *	1 Aug	OR
Women's 50 metre rifle three positions	Final	Chiara Leone	Switzerland	464.4	2 Aug	OR
Mixed skeet team	Qualification	Diana Bacosi; Gabriele Rossetti	Italy	149	5 Aug	=WR

Notes:

- Maddalena and Zhang tied during qualification so they share the qualification Olympic record.

== Sport climbing ==
Event	Round	Name	Nation	Time	Date	Record
Women's speed	Qualification	Zhou Yafei	China	6.54	5 August	OR
Women's speed	Qualification	Desak Made Rita Kusuma Dewi	Indonesia	6.52	5 August	OR
Women's speed	Qualification	Emma Hunt	United States	6.36	5 August	OR
Women's speed	Qualification	Aleksandra Mirosław	Poland	6.21	5 August	WR
Women's speed	Qualification	Aleksandra Mirosław	Poland	6.06	5 August	WR
Men's speed	Finals	Sam Watson	United States	4.74	8 August	WR

== Swimming ==
=== Men ===
Event	Round	Name	Nation	Time	Date	Record	Day
Men's 100 metre freestyle	Final	Pan Zhanle	China	46.92 r	27 July	OR	1
Men's 400 metre individual medley	Final	Léon Marchand	France	4:02.95	28 July	OR	2
Men's 800 metre freestyle	Final	Daniel Wiffen	Ireland	7:38.19	30 July	OR	4
Men's 200 metre butterfly	Final	Léon Marchand	France	1:51.21	31 July	OR	5
Men's 200 metre breaststroke	Final	Léon Marchand	France	2:05.85	31 July	OR	5
Men's 100 metre freestyle	Final	Pan Zhanle	China	46.40	31 July	WR	5
Men's 200 metre individual medley	Final	Léon Marchand	France	1:54.06	2 Aug	OR	7
Men's 1500 metre freestyle	Final	Bobby Finke	United States	14:30.67	4 Aug	WR	9

=== Women ===
Event	Round	Name	Nation	Time	Date	Record	Day
Women's 100 metre butterfly	Semifinal 1	Gretchen Walsh	United States	55.38	27 July	OR	1
Women's 4 × 100 metre freestyle relay	Final	Mollie O'Callaghan (52.24); Shayna Jack (52.35); Emma McKeon (52.39); Meg Harris (51.94)	Australia	3:28.92	27 July	OR	1
Women's 200 metre freestyle	Final	Mollie O'Callaghan	Australia	1:53.27	29 July	OR	3
Women's 100 metre backstroke	Final	Kaylee McKeown	Australia	57.33	30 July	OR	4
Women's 1500 metre freestyle	Final	Katie Ledecky	United States	15:30.02	31 July	OR	5
Women's 200 metre butterfly	Final	Summer McIntosh	Canada	2:03.03	1 Aug	OR	6
Women's 4 × 200 metre freestyle relay	Final	Mollie O'Callaghan (1:53.52); Lani Pallister (1:55.61); Brianna Throssell (1:56.00); Ariarne Titmus (1:52.95)	Australia	7:38.08	1 Aug	OR	6
Women's 200 metre backstroke	Final	Kaylee McKeown	Australia	2:03.73	2 Aug	OR	7
Women's 50 metre freestyle	Semifinal 2	Sarah Sjöström	Sweden	23.66	3 Aug	OR	8
Women's 200 metre individual medley	Final	Summer McIntosh	Canada	2:06.56	3 Aug	OR	8
Women's 100 metre backstroke	Final	Regan Smith	United States	57.28 r	4 Aug	OR	9
Women's 4 × 100 metre medley relay	Final	Regan Smith (57.28); Lilly King (1:04.90); Gretchen Walsh (55.03); Torri Huske (52.42)	United States	3:49.63	4 Aug	WR	9

=== Mixed ===
Event	Round	Name	Nation	Time	Date	Record	Day
Mixed 4 × 100 metre medley relay	Final	Ryan Murphy (52.08); Nic Fink (58.29); Gretchen Walsh (55.18); Torri Huske (51.88)	United States	3:37.43	3 Aug	WR	8

Legend: r – As part of the first leg of relay.

- All world records (WR) are consequently Olympic records (OR).

== Weightlifting ==
=== Men ===
Event	Round	Name	Nationality	Weight	Date	Record
Men's 61 kg	Snatch	Li Fabin	China	143 kg	7 Aug	OR
Men's 73 kg	Clean & Jerk	Rizki Juniansyah	Indonesia	199 kg	7 Aug	OR
Men's 89 kg	Clean & Jerk	Karlos Nasar	Bulgaria	224 kg	9 Aug	WR
Men's 89 kg	Total	Karlos Nasar	Bulgaria	404 kg	9 Aug	WR

=== Women ===
Event	Round	Name	Nationality	Weight	Date	Record
Women's 49 kg	Clean & Jerk	Hou Zhihui	China	117 kg	7 Aug	OR
Women's 59 kg	Snatch	Luo Shifang	China	107 kg	8 Aug	OR
Women's 59 kg	Clean & Jerk	Luo Shifang	China	134 kg	8 Aug	OR
Women's 59 kg	Total	Luo Shifang	China	241 kg	8 Aug	OR
Women's 71 kg	Snatch	Olivia Reeves	United States	117 kg	9 Aug	OR
Women's 81 kg	Clean & Jerk	Solfrid Koanda	Norway	154 kg	10 Aug	OR
Women's 81 kg	Total	Solfrid Koanda	Norway	275 kg	10 Aug	OR
