= Archery at the 2024 Summer Olympics =

Archery at the Games of the XXXIII Olympiad
- Archery pictogram for the 2024 Summer Olympics
- Venue: Les Invalides
- Dates: 25 July – 4 August 2024
- No. of events: 5 (2 men, 2 women, 1 mixed)
- Competitors: 128 from 53 nations

The archery competitions at the 2024 Summer Olympics in Paris took place over seven days, from 25 July to 4 August, at Les Invalides. 128 archers (64 for each gender) competed across five events, with the mixed team recurve returning to the Olympic program for the second time.

== Qualification ==
In the initial quarter of 2022, the International Olympic Committee and World Archery agreed to change the rules on the allocation of the Olympic quota places, ensuring the vast promotion of geographical universal opportunities for the archers around the world at the Games. A total of 128 quota places were awarded at the top-level global and continental meets, with an equal distribution between men and women.

Each National Olympic Committee (NOC) was permitted to enter a maximum of six archers, three per gender. NOCs qualifying for a gender-based team recurve could select three members to form a squad, ensuring that each competed in the individual recurve.

Twelve slots were available for each gender in the team recurve events, with thirty-six individuals competing against each other through a team-based qualification pathway. While three tickets remained available at the final qualifying meet, the number of quota places at the Worlds was reduced to three that climb the podium. The other five tickets were assigned instead to the continental team champions from Europe, Asia, and the Americas, and the top two teams through the world rankings after the final qualifying meet.

Throughout the process, twenty-eight individual quota places were awarded to the highest-ranked archers at the 2023 World Championships in Berlin, Germany, the continental Games (European Games, Asian Games, and the Pan American Games), whether mixed team champions or individual recurve gold medalists, the standalone continental meets (Africa, Europe, Asia, Oceania, and the Americas), and at the final qualification tournament, scheduled for mid-2024.

Host nation France reserved three quota places each for the men's and women's events, along with the mixed team recurve, while four spots were allocated to the eligible NOCs interested in having their archers compete in Paris 2024, as granted by the Universality principle.

== Competition format ==
A total of 128 athletes competed across the five events: the men's and women's individual recurve, the men's and women's team recurve, and the mixed team recurve, an event added to the program at Tokyo 2020.

All five events were recurve archery events, held under the World Archery-approved 70-meter distance and rules. The competition began with an initial ranking round involving all 64 archers of each gender. Each archer shot 72 om 1 to 12 by aggregating the individual scores for the members of each team. Additionally, the ranking round determined the 16 pairs qualifying for the mixed team event (specifically, for the nations consisting of both a male and a female archer, the top men's score and the top women's score are combined), along with the top 16 seeds.

Each event was staged through a single-elimination tournament format, except for the semifinal losers, who played off to decide the bronze medal winner.

=== Individual events ===
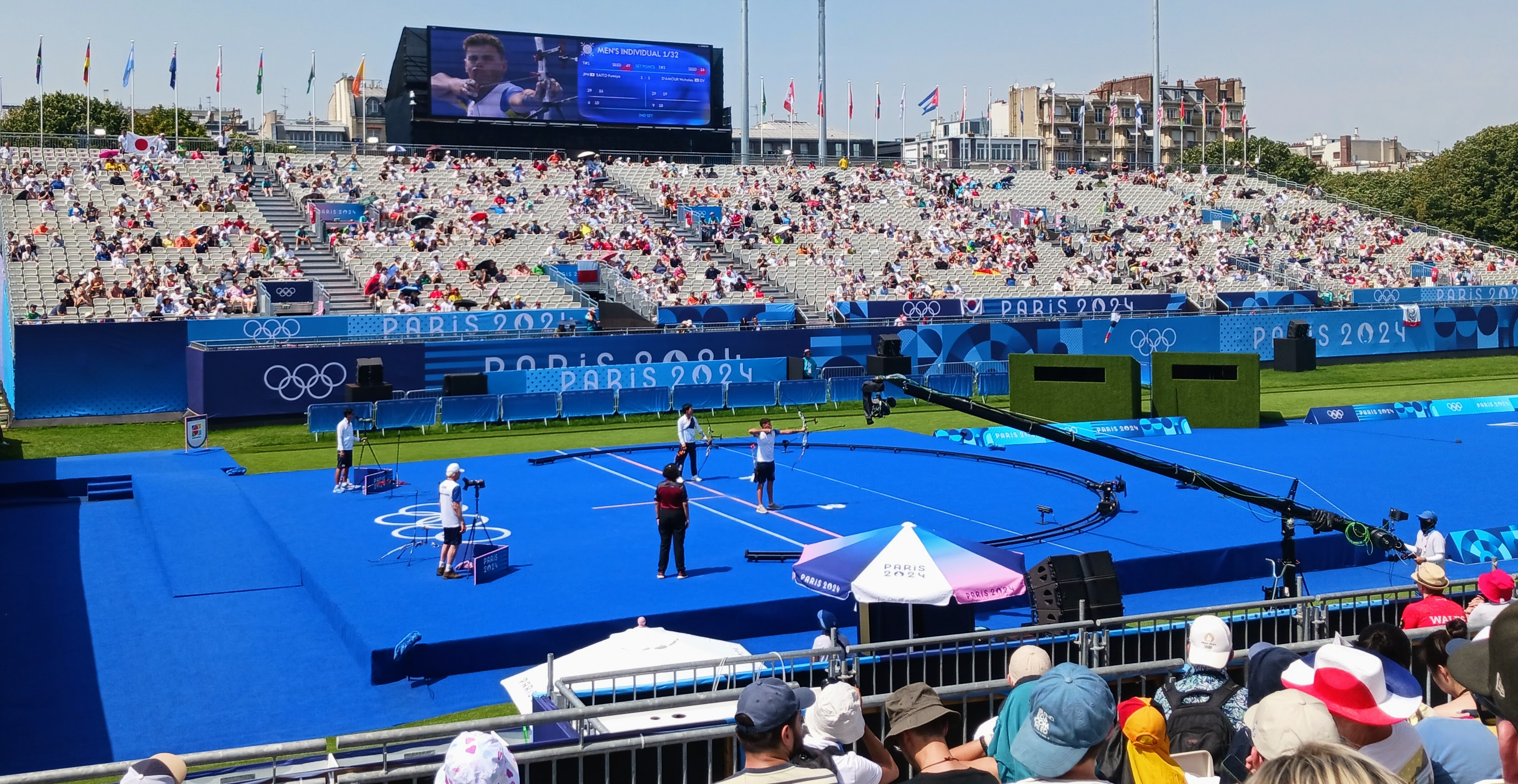
Men's Individual Archery at the Les Invalides venue.

In the individual events, all 64 archers entered the competition in the first round. The draw was seeded based on the result of the ranking round, so the first seed shot against the sixty-fourth seed in the initial round.

Each match was scored through the Archery Olympic Round, consisting of the best-of-five sets, with three arrows per set. The winner of each set received two points. If the scores in the set were tied, then each archer received one point. If the score was tied at 5–5 at the end of five sets, a single arrow shoot-off was held, and the closest to the center was declared the winner.

=== Men's and women's team events ===
The top four seeded teams from the ranking round advanced directly to the quarterfinal stage in the team events. The remaining eight teams, seeded fifth to twelfth, contested against each other for the remaining half of the quarterfinal places.

The team event followed the same Archery Olympic Round set system as the individual event, although each set consisted of six arrows (two per team member), and only four sets were held.

=== Mixed team event ===
The top 16 seeded teams from the ranking round in the mixed team event competed in a single-elimination bracket. Like the men's and women's team events, the set system used two arrows per team member (which denoted four arrows per NOC in the mixed team) and four sets.

== Competition schedule ==
All times use Central European Summer Time (UTC+2)

Date	Start	Finish	Event	Phase
25 July	09:30	12:30	Women's individual	Ranking round
25 July	14:15	17:15	Men's individual	Ranking round
28 July	09:30	11:05	Women's team	Round of 16
28 July	14:15	17:55	Women's team	Quarterfinals, Semifinals, Medal matches
29 July	09:30	11:05	Men's team	Round of 16
29 July	14:15	17:55	Men's team	Quarterfinals, Semifinals, Medal matches
30 July	12:00	15:55	Men's individual	Round of 64/Round of 32
30 July	12:00	15:55	Women's individual	Round of 64/Round of 32
30 July	17:45	20:25	Men's individual	Round of 64/Round of 32
30 July	17:45	20:25	Women's individual	Round of 64/Round of 32
31 July	12:00	15:55	Men's individual	Round of 64/Round of 32
31 July	12:00	15:55	Women's individual	Round of 64/Round of 32
31 July	17:45	20:25	Men's individual	Round of 64/Round of 32
31 July	17:45	20:25	Women's individual	Round of 64/Round of 32
1 August	09:30	13:25	Men's individual	Round of 64/Round of 32
1 August	09:30	13:25	Women's individual	Round of 64/Round of 32
1 August	15:30	19:25	Men's individual	Round of 64/Round of 32
1 August	15:30	19:25	Women's individual	Round of 64/Round of 32
2 August	09:30	12:05	Mixed team	Round of 16
2 August	14:15	17:25	Mixed team	Quarterfinals, Semifinals, Medal matches
3 August	09:30	11:15	Women's individual	Round of 16
3 August	13:00	15:20	Women's individual	Quarterfinals, Semifinals, Medal matches
4 August	09:30	11:15	Men's individual	Round of 16
4 August	13:00	15:20	Men's individual	Quarterfinals, Semifinals, Medal matches

== Participating nations ==
53 NOCs qualified archers.

- Argentina (1)
- Australia (2)
- Austria (1)
- Azerbaijan (1)
- Bangladesh (1)
- Bhutan (1)
- Brazil (2)
- Canada (2)
- Chad (1)
- Chile (1)
- China (6)
- Colombia (4)
- Cuba (1)
- Czech Republic (2)
- Denmark (1)
- Egypt (2)
- El Salvador (1)
- Estonia (1)
- Finland (1)
- France (6)
- Germany (4)
- Great Britain (6)
- Guinea (1)
- India (6)
- Indonesia (4)
- Iran (1)
- Israel (2)
- Italy (4)
- Japan (4)
- Kazakhstan (3)
- Luxembourg (1)
- Malaysia (3)
- Mexico (6)
- Moldova (2)
- Mongolia (1)
- Netherlands (4)
- Poland (1)
- Puerto Rico (1)
- Romania (1)
- San Marino (1)
- Slovakia (1)
- Slovenia (2)
- South Africa (1)
- South Korea (6)
- Spain (2)
- Chinese Taipei (6)
- Tunisia (1)
- Turkey (4)
- Ukraine (2)
- United States (4)
- Uzbekistan (2)
- Vietnam (2)
- Virgin Islands (1)

== Records ==
Event	Round	Name	Nation	Score	Date	Record
Women's individual	Ranking round	Lim Si-hyeon	South Korea	694	25 July	WR
Women's team	Ranking round	Jeon Hun-young; Lim Si-hyeon; Nam Su-hyeon	South Korea	2046	25 July	OR
Mixed team	Ranking round	Kim Woo-jin; Lim Si-hyeon	South Korea	1380	25 July	OR

== Medal summary ==
=== Medal table ===
* Host nation (France)

Rank	NOC	Gold	Silver	Bronze	Total
1	South Korea	5	1	1	7
2	France*	0	1	1	2
2	United States	0	1	1	2
4	China	0	1	0	1
4	Germany	0	1	0	1
6	Mexico	0	0	1	1
6	Turkey	0	0	1	1
Totals (7 entries)		5	5	5	15

=== Medalists ===
Event	Gold	Silver	Bronze
Men's individual	Kim Woo-jin; South Korea	Brady Ellison; United States	Lee Woo-seok; South Korea
Men's team	South Korea; Kim Je-deok; Kim Woo-jin; Lee Woo-seok	France; Baptiste Addis; Thomas Chirault; Jean-Charles Valladont	Turkey; Mete Gazoz; Berkim Tümer; Abdullah Yıldırmış
Women's individual	Lim Si-hyeon; South Korea	Nam Su-hyeon; South Korea	Lisa Barbelin; France
Women's team	South Korea; Jeon Hun-young; Lim Si-hyeon; Nam Su-hyeon	China; An Qixuan; Li Jiaman; Yang Xiaolei	Mexico; Ángela Ruiz; Alejandra Valencia; Ana Paula Vázquez
Mixed team	South Korea; Kim Woo-jin; Lim Si-hyeon	Germany; Florian Unruh; Michelle Kroppen	United States; Brady Ellison; Casey Kaufhold

== See also ==
- Archery at the 2022 Asian Games
- Archery at the 2023 European Games
- Archery at the 2023 Pan American Games
- Archery at the 2024 Summer Paralympics
