= 2024 Archery World Cup =

International archery competition

- Sport: Archery
- Duration: 23 April – 20 October

World Cup Final
- Recurve Men: (gold) (South Korea) Kim Woo-jin; (silver) (South Korea) Lee Woo-seok; (bronze) (Brazil) Marcus D'Almeida
- Recurve Women: (gold) (China) Li Jiaman; (silver) (India) Deepika Kumari; (bronze) (Mexico) Alejandra Valencia
- Compound Men: (gold) (United States) James Lutz; (silver) (Denmark) Mathias Fullerton; (bronze) (Netherlands) Mike Schloesser
- Compound Women: (gold) (Colombia) Sara López; (silver) (Estonia) Meeri-Marita Paas; (bronze) (Mexico) Dafne Quintero

Seasons
- ← 2023 2025 →

The 2024 Archery World Cup, also known as the Hyundai Archery World Cup for sponsorship reasons, was the 18th edition of the international archery circuit organised annually by World Archery. The 2024 World Cup consisted of four events, and ran from 23 April to 20 October 2024.

== Calendar ==
The calendar for the 2024 World Cup, announced by World Archery.

Stage	Date	Location	Ref.
1	23–28 April	Shanghai, China	
2	21–26 May	Yecheon, South Korea	
3	18–23 June	(Turkey) Antalya, Türkiye	
Final	19–20 October	Tlaxcala, Mexico	

== Results ==
=== Recurve ===
==== Men's individual ====
Stage	Venue	1st place, gold medalist(s)	2nd place, silver medalist(s)	3rd place, bronze medalist(s)
1	(China) Shanghai	(Spain) Andrés Temiño	(South Korea) Kim Je-deok	(South Korea) Kim Woo-jin
2	(South Korea) Yecheon	(South Korea) Lee Woo-seok	(South Korea) Kim Woo-jin	(Turkey) Abdullah Yıldırmış
3	(Turkey) Antalya	(South Korea) Kim Woo-jin	(Brazil) Marcus D'Almeida	(India) Dhiraj Bommadevara
Final	(Mexico) Tlaxcala	(South Korea) Kim Woo-jin	(South Korea) Lee Woo-seok	(Brazil) Marcus D'Almeida

==== Women's individual ====
Stage	Venue	1st place, gold medalist(s)	2nd place, silver medalist(s)	3rd place, bronze medalist(s)
1	(China) Shanghai	(South Korea) Lim Si-hyeon	(India) Deepika Kumari	(China) Li Jiaman
2	(South Korea) Yecheon	(South Korea) Lim Si-hyeon	(South Korea) Jeon Hun-young	(Mexico) Alejandra Valencia
3	(Turkey) Antalya	(China) Yang Xiaolei	(Japan) Waka Sonoda	(Mexico) Alejandra Valencia
Final	(Mexico) Tlaxcala	(China) Li Jiaman	(India) Deepika Kumari	(Mexico) Alejandra Valencia

==== Men's team ====
Stage	Venue	1st place, gold medalist(s)	2nd place, silver medalist(s)	3rd place, bronze medalist(s)
1	(China) Shanghai	India; Dhiraj Bommadevara; Pravin Jadhav; Tarundeep Rai	South Korea; Kim Je-deok; Kim Woo-jin; Lee Woo-seok	Chinese Taipei; Lin Zih-siang; Tai Yu-hsuan; Tang Chih-chun
2	(South Korea) Yecheon	South Korea; Kim Je-deok; Kim Woo-jin; Lee Woo-seok	Germany; Florian Unruh; Jonathan Vetter; Moritz Wieser	Canada; Eric Peters; Reece Wilson-Poyton; Brandon Xuereb
3	(Turkey) Antalya	South Korea; Kim Je-deok; Kim Woo-jin; Lee Woo-seok	France; Baptiste Addis; Thomas Chirault; Jean-Charles Valladont	China; Kao Wenchao; Li Zhongyuan; Wang Yan

==== Women's team ====
Stage	Venue	1st place, gold medalist(s)	2nd place, silver medalist(s)	3rd place, bronze medalist(s)
1	(China) Shanghai	China; An Qixuan; Li Jiaman; Yang Xiaolei	South Korea; Jeon Hun-young; Lim Si-hyeon; Nam Su-hyeon	Germany; Katharina Bauer; Charline Schwarz; Elisa Tartler
2	(South Korea) Yecheon	China; An Qixuan; Li Jiaman; Xu Zhiyun	South Korea; Jeon Hun-young; Lim Si-hyeon; Nam Su-hyeon	Germany; Katharina Bauer; Michelle Kroppen; Elisa Tartler
3	(Turkey) Antalya	South Korea; Jeon Hun-young; Lim Si-hyeon; Nam Su-hyeon	France; Lisa Barbelin; Amélie Cordeau; Caroline Lopez	Japan; Satsuki Noda; Waka Sonoda; Ruka Uehara

==== Mixed team ====
Stage	Venue	1st place, gold medalist(s)	2nd place, silver medalist(s)	3rd place, bronze medalist(s)
1	(China) Shanghai	South Korea; Lim Si-hyeon; Kim Woo-jin	Spain; Elia Canales; Andrés Temiño	India; Ankita Bhakat; Dhiraj Bommadevara
2	(South Korea) Yecheon	Mexico; Alejandra Valencia; Matías Grande	Japan; Ruka Uehara; Junya Nakanishi	Spain; Elia Canales; Andrés Temiño
3	(Turkey) Antalya	Japan; Waka Sonoda; Takaharu Furukawa	South Korea; Jeon Hun-young; Lee Woo-seok	India; Bhajan Kaur; Dhiraj Bommadevara

=== Compound ===
==== Men's individual ====
Stage	Venue	1st place, gold medalist(s)	2nd place, silver medalist(s)	3rd place, bronze medalist(s)
1	(China) Shanghai	(Austria) Nico Wiener	(India) Priyansh Kumar	(United States) Nick Kappers
2	(South Korea) Yecheon	(United States) Sawyer Sullivan	(United States) James Lutz	(Netherlands) Mike Schloesser
3	(Turkey) Antalya	(Netherlands) Mike Schloesser	(India) Priyansh Kumar	(Denmark) Mathias Fullerton
Final	(Mexico) Tlaxcala	(United States) James Lutz	(Denmark) Mathias Fullerton	(Netherlands) Mike Schloesser

==== Women's individual ====
Stage	Venue	1st place, gold medalist(s)	2nd place, silver medalist(s)	3rd place, bronze medalist(s)
1	(China) Shanghai	(India) Jyothi Surekha Vennam	(Mexico) Andrea Becerra	(United States) Alexis Ruiz
2	(South Korea) Yecheon	(Colombia) Sara López	(Mexico) Andrea Becerra	(South Korea) Han Seung-yeon
3	(Turkey) Antalya	(Italy) Elisa Roner	(Estonia) Meeri-Marita Paas	(United Kingdom) Ella Gibson
Final	(Mexico) Tlaxcala	(Colombia) Sara López	(Estonia) Meeri-Marita Paas	(Mexico) Dafne Quintero

==== Men's team ====
Stage	Venue	1st place, gold medalist(s)	2nd place, silver medalist(s)	3rd place, bronze medalist(s)
1	(China) Shanghai	India; Prathamesh Bhalchandra Fuge; Priyansh Kumar; Abhishek Verma	Netherlands; Sil Pater; Mike Schloesser; Stef Willems	South Korea; Kim Jong-ho; Park Seung-hyun; Yang Jae-won
2	(South Korea) Yecheon	United States; James Lutz; Kris Schaff; Sawyer Sullivan	Turkey; Batuhan Akçaoğlu; Emircan Haney; Sezgin Yağız	Australia; Brandon Hawes; Jonathon Milne; Bailey Wildman
3	(Turkey) Antalya	Italy; Marco Bruno; Elia Fregnan; Michea Godano	Turkey; Batuhan Akçaoğlu; Emircan Haney; Sezgin Yağız	France; Jean Philippe Boulch; Nicolas Girard; Adrien Gontier

==== Women's team ====
Stage	Venue	1st place, gold medalist(s)	2nd place, silver medalist(s)	3rd place, bronze medalist(s)
1	(China) Shanghai	India; Parneet Kaur; Aditi Gopichand Swami; Jyothi Surekha Vennam	Italy; Irene Franchini; Elisa Roner; Marcella Tonioli	Kazakhstan; Viktoriya Lyan; Aizhan Seidakhmetova; Adel Zhexenbinova
2	(South Korea) Yecheon	India; Parneet Kaur; Aditi Gopichand Swami; Jyothi Surekha Vennam	Turkey; Hazal Burun; Ayşe Bera Süzer; Begüm Yuva	United States; Olivia Dean; Carson Krahe; Alexis Ruiz
3	(Turkey) Antalya	India; Parneet Kaur; Aditi Gopichand Swami; Jyothi Surekha Vennam	Estonia; Lisell Jäätma; Meeri-Marita Paas; Maris Tetsmann	Great Britain; Layla Annison; Isabelle Carpenter; Ella Gibson

==== Mixed team ====
Stage	Venue	1st place, gold medalist(s)	2nd place, silver medalist(s)	3rd place, bronze medalist(s)
1	(China) Shanghai	India; Jyothi Surekha Vennam; Abhishek Verma	Estonia; Lisell Jäätma; Robin Jäätma	United States; Olivia Dean; Kris Schaff
2	(South Korea) Yecheon	United States; Olivia Dean; Sawyer Sullivan	India; Jyothi Surekha Vennam; Priyansh Kumar	Colombia; Sara López; Pablo Gómez
3	(Turkey) Antalya	Kazakhstan; Adel Zhexenbinova; Andrey Tyutyun	Great Britain; Ella Gibson; Ajay Scott	Italy; Elisa Roner; Elia Fregnan

== Medals table ==
Rank	Nation	Gold	Silver	Bronze	Total
1	South Korea	9	8	3	20
2	India	7	5	3	15
3	United States	4	1	4	9
4	China	4	0	2	6
5	Italy	2	1	1	4
6	Colombia	2	0	1	3
7	Mexico	1	2	4	7
8	Japan	1	2	1	4
9	Netherlands	1	1	2	4
10	Spain	1	1	1	3
11	Kazakhstan	1	0	1	2
12	Austria	1	0	0	1
13	Estonia	0	4	0	4
14	Turkey	0	3	1	4
15	France	0	2	1	3
16	Germany	0	1	2	3
16	Great Britain	0	1	2	3
18	Brazil	0	1	1	2
18	Denmark	0	1	1	2
20	Australia	0	0	1	1
20	Canada	0	0	1	1
20	Chinese Taipei	0	0	1	1
Totals (22 entries)		34	34	34	102
