= List of Olympic records in archery =

This is a list of Olympic records in archery.

== Men's records ==
♦ denotes a performance that is also a current world record. Statistics are correct as of the end of the 2024 Olympics.

Event	Score	Name	Nation	Games	Date	Ref
Recurve (Current)
72 arrow ranking round	700	Kim Woo-jin	South Korea	(Brazil) 2016 Rio	5 August 2016	
216 arrow team ranking round	♦2087	Im Dong-hyun; Kim Bub-min; Oh Jin-hyek	South Korea	(United Kingdom) 2012 London	27 July 2012	
Recurve (Historic)
12 arrow match	117	Lee Chang-hwan	South Korea	(China) 2008 Beijing	13 August 2008	
18 arrow match	173	Park Kyung-mo	South Korea	(Greece) 2004 Athens	19 August 2004	
36 arrow elimination	339	Chen Szu-yuan	Chinese Taipei	(Greece) 2004 Athens	19 August 2004	
36 arrow finals	340	Tim Cuddihy	Australia	(Greece) 2004 Athens	19 August 2004	
24 arrow team match	227	Im Dong-hyun; Lee Chang-hwan; Park Kyung-mo	South Korea	(China) 2008 Beijing	11 August 2008	
27 arrow team match	258	Jang Yong-ho; Oh Kyo-moon; Kim Chung-tae	South Korea	(Australia) 2000 Sydney	22 September 2000	
54 arrow team finals	502	Justin Huish; Butch Johnson; Rod White	United States	(United States) 1996 Atlanta	2 August 1996	

== Women's records ==
♦ denotes a performance that is also a current world record. Statistics are correct as of the end of the 2024 Olympics.

Event	Score	Name	Nation	Games	Date	Ref
Recurve (Current)
72 arrow ranking round	♦694	Lim Si-hyeon	South Korea	(France) 2024 Paris	25 July 2024	
216 arrow team ranking round	2046	Jeon Hun-young; Lim Si-hyeon; Nam Su-hyeon	South Korea	(France) 2024 Paris	25 July 2024	
Recurve (Historic)
12 arrow match	115	Park Sung-hyun	South Korea	(China) 2008 Beijing	14 August 2008	
18 arrow match	173	Yun Mi-jin	South Korea	(Australia) 2000 Sydney	19 September 2000	
36 arrow elimination	341	Yun Mi-jin	South Korea	(Greece) 2004 Athens	18 August 2004	
36 arrow finals	334	Kim Nam-soon	South Korea	(Australia) 2000 Sydney	19 September 2000	
24 arrow team match	231	Park Sung-hyun; Joo Hyun-jung; Yun Ok-hee	South Korea	(China) 2008 Beijing	10 August 2008	
27 arrow team match	252	Kim Soo-nyung; Kim Nam-soon; Yun Mi-jin	South Korea	(Australia) 2000 Sydney	21 September 2000	
54 arrow team finals	502	Kim Soo-nyung; Kim Nam-soon; Yun Mi-jin	South Korea	(Australia) 2000 Sydney	21 September 2000	

== Mixed team record ==
Event	Score	Name	Nation	Games	Date	Ref
Recurve (Current)
144 arrow ranking round	1380	Kim Woo-jin; Lim Si-hyeon	South Korea	(France) 2024 Paris	25 July 2024	
