= Archery at the 2024 Summer Olympics – Mixed team =

Mixed team at the Games of the XXXIII Olympiad
- Venue: Les Invalides
- Date: 25 July 2024 (ranking round); 2 August (match play)
- Competitors: 54 from 27 nations

Medalists
1st place, gold medalist(s)		Kim Woo-jin; Lim Si-hyeon	South Korea
2nd place, silver medalist(s)		Florian Unruh; Michelle Kroppen	Germany
3rd place, bronze medalist(s)		Brady Ellison; Casey Kaufhold	United States

The mixed team archery event is one of five archery events held at the 2024 Summer Olympics. It was held at Les Invalides, with the ranking round taking place on 25 July and match play on 2 August. This was the second consecutive appearance of the event, which has been held every Games since 2020.

== Records ==
Prior to this competition, the existing world and Olympic records were as follows.

- 144 arrow ranking round

World record	South Korea; Kang Chae-young, Lee Woo-seok	1388	's-Hertogenbosch, Netherlands	10 June 2019
Olympic record	South Korea; An San, Kim Je-deok	1368	Tokyo, Japan	23 July 2021

== Schedule ==
All times are Central European Summer Time (UTC+2)

The schedule for the mixed team event covers two separate days of competition.

Date	Time	Round
25 July 2024	9:30; 14:15	Women's ranking round Men's ranking round
2 August 2024	9:30; 14:15; 15:31; 16:24; 16:43	1/8 finals Quarter-finals; Semi-finals; Bronze medal match Gold medal match

== Results ==
=== Ranking round ===
27 nations have at least 1 male and 1 female archer. The highest scoring (non-nominative) of each sex is taken from a nation entering a men or a women's team. The top 16 progress to the play-off rounds.

Rank	Nation	Archers		Score	10s	Xs
Rank	Nation	Male	Female	Score	10s	Xs
1	South Korea	Kim Woo-jin	Lim Si-hyeon	1380 (OR) Q	91	38
2	Germany	Florian Unruh	Michelle Kroppen	1351 Q	70	29
3	United States	Brady Ellison	Casey Kaufhold	1349 Q	68	23
4	China	Wang Yan	Yang Xiaolei	1348 Q	68	23
5	India	Dhiraj Bommadevara	Ankita Bhakat	1347 Q	69	23
6	Turkey	Mete Gazoz	Elif Berra Gökkır	1347 Q	68	27
7	Mexico	Matías Grande	Alejandra Valencia	1345 Q	67	26
8	France	Baptiste Addis	Amélie Cordeau	1339 Q	64	22
9	Italy	Mauro Nespoli	Chiara Rebagliati	1333 Q	63	22
10	Brazil	Marcus D'Almeida	Ana Luiza Caetano	1333 Q	56	15
11	Japan	Junya Nakanishi	Satsuki Noda	1329 Q	58	18
12	Indonesia	Arif Dwi Pangestu	Diananda Choirunisa	1326 Q	63	19
13	Spain	Pablo Acha	Elia Canales	1324 Q	55	28
14	Uzbekistan	Amirkhon Sadikov	Ziyodakhon Abdusattorova	1323 Q	54	18
15	Colombia	Santiago Arcila	Ana Rendón	1322 Q	60	11
16	Chinese Taipei	Tai Yu-hsuan	Lei Chien-ying	1317^{(19)} q	58	15
17	Netherlands	Steve Wijler	Gabriela Schloesser	1317^{(18)}	53	20
18	Israel	Roy Dror	Mikaella Moshe	1315	57	21
19	Great Britain	Alex Wise	Bryony Pitman	1310	49	15
20	Canada	Eric Peters	Virginie Chénier	1308	47	20
21	Ukraine	Mykhailo Usach	Veronika Marchenko	1308	43	10
22	Moldova	Dan Olaru	Alexandra Mîrca	1302	58	13
23	Slovenia	Žiga Ravnikar	Žana Pintarič	1301	52	17
24	Vietnam	Lê Quốc Phong	Đỗ Thị Ánh Nguyệt	1300	45	14
25	Czech Republic	Adam Li	Marie Horáčková	1278	44	18
26	Australia	Peter Boukouvalas	Laura Paeglis	1278	37	13
27	Egypt	Youssof Tolba	Jana Ali	1197	29	11

Note: France swapped out its highest scoring women's archer from the ranking round. Lisa Barbelin will compete in the final rounds.

=== Competition bracket ===
1/8 eliminations
1	South Korea	5	37	39	37	38	20
16	Chinese Taipei	4	35	37	38	40	19
9	Italy	6	38	39	36
8	France	0	37	36	35
5	India	5	37	38	38
12	Indonesia	1	36	38	37
13	Spain	6	39	36	37	39
4	China	2	37	36	37	38
3	United States	6	38	37	38
14	Uzbekistan	0	34	36	37
11	Japan	5	38	38	39	36	19+
6	Turkey	4	37	39	37	40	19
7	Mexico	5	37	36	37
10	Brazil	1	36	36	36
15	Colombia	4	38	37	36	34	17
2	Germany	5	37	39	35	37	18

Quarter-finals
1	South Korea	6	34	39	38	40
9	Italy	2	38	37	36	38
5	India	5	38	38	36	37
13	Spain	3	37	38	37	36
3	United States	5	38	36	39	37
11	Japan	3	36	40	37	37
7	Mexico	1	37	38	38
2	Germany	5	38	38	39

Semi-finals
1	South Korea	6	36	38	38	39
5	India	2	38	35	37	38
3	United States	3	39	37	37	34
2	Germany	5	38	38	37	39

Gold medal match
1	South Korea	6	38	36	36
2	Germany	0	35	35	35
Bronze medal match
5	India	2	37	35	38	35
3	United States	6	38	37	34	37

- The figure in italics signifies the set scores.

(+) Won the shoot-off by the arrow closer to the center of the target.
