= Indonesia at the 2024 Summer Olympics =

- IOC code: INA
- NOC: Indonesian Olympic Committee
- Website: www.nocindonesia.id (in Indonesian and English)

in Paris, France 26 July 2024 – 11 August 2024
- Competitors: 29 (16 men and 13 women) in 12 sports
- Flag bearer (opening): Maryam March Maharani
- Flag bearer (closing): Rizki Juniansyah
- Officials: Anindya Novyan Bakrie (chef de mission)
- Medals Ranked 39th: Gold 2 Silver 0 Bronze 1 Total 3

Summer Olympics appearances (overview)
- 1952; 1956; 1960; 1964; 1968; 1972; 1976; 1980; 1984; 1988; 1992; 1996; 2000; 2004; 2008; 2012; 2016; 2020; 2024

Indonesia competed at the 2024 Summer Olympics in Paris from 26 July to 11 August 2024. It was the nation's seventeenth appearance at the Summer Olympics, except for two occasions, Tokyo 1964 due to GANEFO concerns, and Moscow 1980 due to US led boycott.

Indonesia left Paris with three medals (two golds and one bronze), two medals fewer than its previous Olympic appearance in 2020. Despite this, the 2024 Games was the first time since 1992 that Indonesia won two gold medals, achieved by Veddriq Leonardo in the speed category of sport climbing and Rizki Juniansyah in weightlifting. Both were the country's first gold medals outside of badminton. Meanwhile, Indonesian athletes failed to win any gold medals in badminton for only the second time since 1992 (the other time being the 2012 Summer Olympics in London), though unlike 2012, Gregoria Mariska Tunjung managed to secure a bronze medal in women's singles.

== Medalists ==
| Medal | Name | Sport | Event | Date |
|---|---|---|---|---|
| Gold | Veddriq Leonardo | Sport climbing | Men's speed | 8 August |
| Gold | Rizki Juniansyah | Weightlifting | Men's −73 kg | 8 August |
| Bronze | Gregoria Mariska Tunjung | Badminton | Women's singles | 5 August |

Medals by sport
| Sport | 1st place, gold medalist(s) | 2nd place, silver medalist(s) | 3rd place, bronze medalist(s) | Total |
| Sport climbing | 1 | 0 | 0 | 1 |
| Weightlifting | 1 | 0 | 0 | 1 |
| Badminton | 0 | 0 | 1 | 1 |
| Total | 2 | 0 | 1 | 3 |

Medals by gender
| Gender | 1st place, gold medalist(s) | 2nd place, silver medalist(s) | 3rd place, bronze medalist(s) | Total |
| Male | 2 | 0 | 0 | 2 |
| Female | 0 | 0 | 1 | 1 |
| Mixed | 0 | 0 | 0 | 0 |
| Total | 2 | 0 | 1 | 3 |

Medals by date
| Date | 1st place, gold medalist(s) | 2nd place, silver medalist(s) | 3rd place, bronze medalist(s) | Total |
| 5 August | 0 | 0 | 1 | 1 |
| 8 August | 2 | 0 | 0 | 2 |
| Total | 2 | 0 | 1 | 3 |

== Competitors ==
The following is the list of number of competitors in the Games.

| Sport | Men | Women | Total |
|---|---|---|---|
| Archery | 1 | 3 | 4 |
| Athletics | 1 | 0 | 1 |
| Badminton | 5 | 4 | 9 |
| Cycling | 1 | 0 | 1 |
| Gymnastics | 0 | 1 | 1 |
| Judo | 0 | 1 | 1 |
| Rowing | 1 | 0 | 1 |
| Shooting | 1 | 0 | 1 |
| Sport climbing | 2 | 2 | 4 |
| Surfing | 1 | 0 | 1 |
| Swimming | 1 | 1 | 2 |
| Weightlifting | 2 | 1 | 3 |
| Total | 16 | 13 | 29 |

== Archery ==
Indonesia fielded one male archer and three female archers in the recurve events, to compete in the mixed team, men's individual's recurve and women's recurve event. The nation's entered one athlete to compete in the men's individual recurve event by virtue of his result at the 2023 World Championships in Berlin, Germany. Meanwhile, the nation's secured the quota in the women's individual recurve by virtue of the result at the 2022 Asian Games in Hangzhou, China; but later on were forced to re-allocated the individual female quotas, through the release of the final world ranking for the women's recurve team; marking the nations return to the women's team competition after a twenty-eight years hiatus from these event.

Diananda Choirunisa's achievement for entering quarterfinals in 2024 Summer Olympics was Indonesia's best achievement in the women's individual event in the history of the olympics since the introduction of the elimination round in Barcelona 1992.

| Athlete | Event | Ranking round | | Round of 64 | Round of 32 | Round of 16 | Quarterfinals | Semifinals | Final / BM | |
| Athlete | Event | Score | Seed | Opposition Score | Opposition Score | Opposition Score | Opposition Score | Opposition Score | Opposition Score | Rank |
|---|---|---|---|---|---|---|---|---|---|---|
| Arif Dwi Pangestu | Men's individual | 656 | 40 | Tang (TPE); L 1–7 | Did not advance | | | | | |
| Diananda Choirunisa | Women's individual | 670 | 6 | Van der Winkel (NED); W 7–1 | GNoriega (USA); W 6–5 | Kaur (IND); W 6–5 | Barbelin (FRA); L 5–6 | Did not advance | | |
| Rezza Octavia | Women's individual | 650 | 32 | Chénier (CAN); W 6–2 | Lim (KOR); L 0–6 | Did not advance | | | | |
| Syifa Nurafifah Kamal | Women's individual | 640 | 43 | Kaur (IND); L 3–7 | Did not advance | | | | | |
| Diananda Choirunisa; Rezza Octavia; Syifa Nurafifah Kamal | Women's team | 1960 | 7 | —N/a | | Malaysia; W 5–3 | China; L 1–5 | Did not advance | | |
| Arif Dwi Pangestu; Diananda Choirunisa | Mixed team | 1326 | 12 Q | —N/a | | India; L 1–5 | Did not advance | | | |

== Athletics ==
Indonesia qualified one sprinter to compete at the Games. 2020 Olympian Lalu Muhammad Zohri secured a quota for himself by receiving a direct universality spot in the men's 100 meters event.

Key

- Note–Ranks given for track events are within the athlete's heat only
- Q = Qualified for the next round
- q = Qualified for the next round as a fastest loser or, in field events, by position without achieving the qualifying target
- NR = National record
- N/A = Round not applicable for the event
- Bye = Athlete not required to compete in round

Track & road events

| Athlete | Event | Preliminary | | First Round | | Semi-finals | | Final | |
| Athlete | Event | Result | Rank | Result | Rank | Result | Rank | Result | Rank |
|---|---|---|---|---|---|---|---|---|---|
| Lalu Muhammad Zohri | Men's 100 m | 10.35 | 2 Q | 10.26 | 6 | Did not advance | | | |

== Badminton ==
Indonesia sent nine players into the tournament based on the BWF Race to Paris Rankings, second least amount of Indonesian players participating, apart from 2012.

The Indonesian squad featured four Tokyo 2020 Olympians; Apriyani Rahayu (reigning Olympic champion of women's doubles), Anthony Sinisuka Ginting (reigning bronze medalist of men's singles), Jonatan Christie, and Gregoria Mariska Tunjung. Apart from that, there were five players who made their Olympics debut in this edition; Fajar Alfian and Muhammad Rian Ardianto (competing in men's doubles), Siti Fadia Silva Ramadhanti (paired up with Apriyani Rahayu in women's doubles), Rinov Rivaldy and Pitha Haningtyas Mentari (competing in mixed doubles).

Both of Indonesia's men's singles failed to qualify to the knockout stage, their worst ever Olympic performance in this category. 2020 Summer Olympics women's doubles defending champion, Apriyani Rahayu, now partnered with Siti Fadia Silva Ramadhanti, failed to qualify to round 16 after suffering three defeats in the group stage. Gregoria Mariska Tunjung who won bronze became the first women's singles player from Indonesia to win a medal since Maria Kristin Yulianti won bronze in 2008 Summer Olympics, marking a 16-year wait.

Men

| Athlete | Event | Group stage | | | | Round of 16 | Quarter-final | Semi-final | Final / BM | |
| Athlete | Event | Opposition Score | Opposition Score | Opposition Score | Rank | Opposition Score | Opposition Score | Opposition Score | Opposition Score | Rank |
|---|---|---|---|---|---|---|---|---|---|---|
| Jonatan Christie | Singles | Carraggi (BEL); W (18–21, 21–11, 21–16) | Cordón (GUA); WDN | Sen (IND); L (18–21, 12–21) | 2 | Did not advance | | | | |
| Anthony Sinisuka Ginting | Singles | Shu (USA); W (21–14, 21–8) | TJ Popov (FRA); L (19–21, 21–17, 15–21) | —N/a | 2 | Did not advance | | | | |
| Fajar Alfian; Muhammad Rian Ardianto | Doubles | Lamsfuß / Seidel (GER); ~~W (21–13, 21–17)~~ (Note: German men's doubles player withdrew due to injury. As per BWF regulations for group stage play, the results of all matches played, or yet to be played by the pair are now considered annulled.) | Corvée / Labar (FRA); W (21–13, 21–10) | Rankireddy / Shetty (IND); L (13–21, 13–21) | 2 Q | —N/a | Liang WK / Wang C (CHN); L (22–24, 20–22) | Did not advance | | |

Women

| Athlete | Event | Group stage | | | | Round of 16 | Quarter-final | Semi-final | Final / BM | |
| Athlete | Event | Opposition Score | Opposition Score | Opposition Score | Rank | Opposition Score | Opposition Score | Opposition Score | Opposition Score | Rank |
|---|---|---|---|---|---|---|---|---|---|---|
| Gregoria Mariska Tunjung | Singles | Buhrova (UKR); W (21–10, 21–15) | Švábíková (CZE); W (21–12, 21–18) | —N/a | 1 Q | Kim G-e (KOR); W (21–4, 8–21, 23–21) | Intanon (THA); W (25–23, 21–9) | An S-y (KOR); L (21–11, 13–21, 16–21) | Marín (ESP); W WO | 3rd place, bronze medalist(s) |
| Apriyani Rahayu; Siti Fadia Silva Ramadhanti | Doubles | Matsumoto / Nagahara (JPN); L (22–24, 15–21) | Chen QC / Jia YF (CHN); L (12–21, 22–24) | Tan / Thinaah (MAS); L (18–21, 9–21) | 4 | —N/a | Did not advance | | | |

Mixed

| Athlete | Event | Group stage | | | | Quarter-final | Semi-final | Final / BM | |
| Athlete | Event | Opposition Score | Opposition Score | Opposition Score | Rank | Opposition Score | Opposition Score | Opposition Score | Rank |
|---|---|---|---|---|---|---|---|---|---|
| Rinov Rivaldy; Pitha Haningtyas Mentari | Doubles | Kim W-h / Jeong N-e (KOR); W (22–20, 14–21, 21–19) | Zheng SW / Huang YQ (CHN); L (10–21, 3–21) | Gicquel / Delrue (FRA); L (13–21, 15–21) | 4 | Did not advance | | | |

== Cycling ==
=== Track ===
Indonesian riders obtained one quotas of men's omnium events, following the release of the final UCI Olympic rankings; marking the nation's first appearance in omnium event at the Olympics and the nations return to the track cycling competition since the last participation in 2004.

Omnium

| Athlete | Event | Scratch race | | Tempo race | | Elimination race | | Points race | | Total | |
| Athlete | Event | Points | Rank | Points | Rank | Points | Rank | Points | Rank | Points | Rank |
|---|---|---|---|---|---|---|---|---|---|---|---|
| Bernard Van Aert | Men's omnium | 6 | 18 | 2 | 20 | 1 | 22 | −40 | 15 | −31 | 20 |

== Gymnastics ==
=== Artistic ===
For the first time in summer olympics edition, Indonesia qualified one gymnast. Rifda Irfanaluthfi got host country reallocation spot by being the next highest-ranked eligible athlete in the All-around at the 2023 World Artistic Gymnastics Championships.

Due to injuries, Irfanaluthfi only competed in uneven bars and not in 3 other apparatuses (vault, balance beam, and floor exercise).

Women

| Athlete | Event | Qualification | | | | | | Final | | | | | |
| Athlete | Event | Apparatus | | | | Total | Rank | Apparatus | | | | Total | Rank |
| Athlete | Event | V | UB | BB | F | Total | Rank | V | UB | BB | F | Total | Rank |
|---|---|---|---|---|---|---|---|---|---|---|---|---|---|
| Rifda Irfanaluthfi | Individual all-around | DNS | 9.166 | DNS | | DNF | | Did not advance | | | | | |

== Judo ==
After not succeeding in qualifying a single judoka in the previous two editions of the Summer Olympics, Indonesia entered one judoka to compete at Paris 2024. Maryam March Maharani secured her spots for women's under 52 kg categories, after being ranked sixth out of ten eligible judoka through the Asian women's continental quota allocation, in the IJF final Olympics ranking.

Maharani finished in the top 16 position after being defeated by 2020 Olympic gold medalist, Distria Krasniqi, who later won silver in this event.

| Athlete | Event | Round of 32 | Round of 16 | Quarterfinals | Semifinals | Repechage | Final / BM | |
| Athlete | Event | Opposition Result | Opposition Result | Opposition Result | Opposition Result | Opposition Result | Opposition Result | Rank |
|---|---|---|---|---|---|---|---|---|
| Maryam March Maharani | Women's 52 kg | Ferreira (MOZ); W 10–00 | Krasniqi (KOS); L 00–10 | Did not advance | | | | |

== Rowing ==
Indonesian rowers qualified one boats in the men's single sculls for the Games, through the 2024 Asia & Oceania Qualification Regatta in Chungju, South Korea. Rio 2016 Olympian, La Memo qualified for the Games, by finishing second in the men's single sculls final A race and securing the second available berths for the nations.

| Athlete | Event | Heats | | Repechage | | Quarterfinals | | Semifinals | | Final | |
| Athlete | Event | Time | Rank | Time | Rank | Time | Rank | Time | Rank | Time | Rank |
|---|---|---|---|---|---|---|---|---|---|---|---|
| La Memo | Men's single sculls | 7:19.33 | 5 R | 7:19.60 | 3 SE/F | Bye | | 7:32.18 | 3 FE | 7:02.23 | 27 |

Qualification Legend: FA=Final A (medal); FB=Final B (non-medal); FC=Final C (non-medal); FD=Final D (non-medal); FE=Final E (non-medal); FF=Final F (non-medal); SA/B=Semi-finals A/B; SC/D=Semi-finals C/D; SE/F=Semi-finals E/F; QF=Quarter-finals; R=Repechage

== Shooting ==
Indonesian shooter achieved a quota place for the following events based on their results at the 2022 and 2023 ISSF World Championships, 2023 and 2024 Asian Championships, and 2024 ISSF World Olympic Qualification Tournament.

| Athlete | Event | Qualification | | Final | |
| Athlete | Event | Points | Rank | Points | Rank |
|---|---|---|---|---|---|
| Fathur Gustafian | Men's 10 m air rifle | 628.7 | 15 | Did not advance | |
| Fathur Gustafian | Men's 50 m rifle 3 positions | 574-19x | 43 | Did not advance | |

== Sport climbing ==
Indonesia entered four climbers for the Olympic Games for the first time ever. Desak Made Rita Kusuma Dewi obtained one of two available berths in the women's event following the triumph of her gold medal achievement at the 2023 World Championships in Bern, Switzerland; Rahmad Adi Mulyono qualified for the Games, following the triumph of his gold medal victory at 2023 Asian Olympic Qualifier in Jakarta; Veddriq Leonardo and Rajiah Sallsabillah qualified for the Games through the final accumulations of Olympic Qualifier Series ranking.

Desak Made was eliminated in the quarterfinals after being beaten by Chinese climber and eventual silver medalist Deng Lijuan, while Sallsabillah qualified for the semifinals. Sallsabillah later was eliminated in the semifinals and unable to get a bronze after a slipping accident in the small final.

Leonardo then won the men's speed event with a 0.02 seconds margin against China's Wu Peng, becoming the first Indonesian non-badminton athlete to win an Olympic gold medal.

Speed

| Athlete | Event | Qualification | | | | Elimination | | Quarterfinals | Semifinals | Final / BM | |
| Athlete | Event | Lane A | Lane B | Time | Rank | Opposition Time | Rank | Opposition Time | Opposition Time | Opposition Time | Rank |
|---|---|---|---|---|---|---|---|---|---|---|---|
| Rahmad Adi Mulyono | Men's | FS | 5.07 (Note: The fastest time in competition will be used to determine which faster loser advanced to the quarterfinals.) | FS (Note: Time used in elimination heats.) | 14 | Leonardo (INA); L 5.13–4.98 | 9 | Did not advance | | | 10 |
| Veddriq Leonardo | Men's | 4.79 =WR (Note: Leonardo had equaled the world record, but the world record later was broken again by Sam Watson.) | 4.92 | 4.79 | 1 | Mulyono (INA); W 4.98–5.13 | 2 | Mawem (FRA); W 4.88–5.26 | Alipour (IRI); W 4.78 =PB–4.84 =PB | Wu P (CHN); W 4.75 =PB–4.77 =PB | 1st place, gold medalist(s) |
| Desak Made Rita Kusuma Dewi | Women's | 6.52 | 6.45 | 6.45 | 6 | Kelly (USA); W 6.38–8.43 | 3 | Deng LJ (CHN); L 6.369 =PB–6.363 | Did not advance | | 6 |
| Rajiah Sallsabillah | Women's | 6.67 | 6.58 | 6.58 | 7 | Romero (ESP) q Fall–7.26 | 7 | Hunt (USA); W 6.54 =PB–7.98 | Deng LJ (CHN); L 6.41 =PB–6.38 | Kałucka (POL); L 8.24–6.53 | 4 |

Qualification legend:
Q - Qualified; q - Qualified by time (loser with best time in heats)
WR - World Record
FS - False Start

== Surfing ==
Indonesian surfers confirmed one shortboard quota place for Tahiti 2024. Tokyo 2020 Olympian Rio Waida, qualified for the Games, by virtue of the results of top six individual men's surfer, not yet qualified, at the 2024 ISA World Surfing Games in Arecibo, Puerto Rico.

| Athlete | Event | Round 1 | | Round 2 | Round 3 | Quarterfinal | Semifinal | Final / BM | |
| Athlete | Event | Score | Rank | Opposition Result | Opposition Result | Opposition Result | Opposition Result | Opposition Result | Rank |
|---|---|---|---|---|---|---|---|---|---|
| Rio Waida | Men's shortboard | 5.74 | 3 R2 | Smith (RSA); L 5.40–9.50 | Did not advance | | | | |

Qualification legend: R3 - Qualifies to elimination rounds; R2 - Qualifies to repechage round

== Swimming ==
Indonesia received two universality quota places in swimming. Joe Kurniawan and Azzahra Permatahani were the ones who received these quotas.

| Athlete | Event | Heat | | Semifinal | | Final | |
| Athlete | Event | Time | Rank | Time | Rank | Time | Rank |
|---|---|---|---|---|---|---|---|
| Joe Kurniawan | Men's 100 m butterfly | 53.95 | 33 | Did not advance | | | |
| Azzahra Permatahani | Women's 200 m individual medley | 2:20.51 | 31 | Did not advance | | | |

== Weightlifting ==
Indonesia entered three weightlifters into the Olympic competition. Four-time Olympian Eko Yuli Irawan (men's 61 kg) and IWF World Cup gold medalist Rizki Juniansyah (men's 73 kg) secured one of the top ten slots in their respective weight divisions based on the IWF Olympic Qualification Rankings. 2024 Asian Championship bronze medalist Nurul Akmal (women's +81 kg) managed to qualify for Paris 2024 through the reallocation of the +81 kg class quota.

Rizki Juniansyah's victory in men's 73 kg marked Indonesia's first ever weightlifting gold at the Olympics and the country's first gold in any original Summer Olympic sports.

| Athlete | Event | Snatch | | Clean & Jerk | | Total | Rank |
| Athlete | Event | Result | Rank | Result | Rank | Total | Rank |
|---|---|---|---|---|---|---|---|
| Eko Yuli Irawan | Men's −61 kg | 135 | 2 | ~~162~~ | — | 135 | DNF |
| Rizki Juniansyah | Men's −73 kg | 155 | 2 | 199 = OR | 1 | 354 | 1st place, gold medalist(s) |
| Nurul Akmal | Women's +81 kg | 105 | 11 | 140 | 10 | 245 | 12 |

Legend:
OR - Olympic Record

== See also ==
- Indonesia at the 2024 Summer Paralympics
