= Syifa =

Syifa is an Indonesian given name. Notable people with the name include:

- Syifa Hadju (born 2000), Indonesian actress and singer
- Syifa Nurafifah Kamal (born 1991), Indonesian recurve archer
