= Chinese Taipei at the 2024 Summer Olympics =

- IOC code: TPE
- NOC: Chinese Taipei Olympic Committee
- Website: www.tpenoc.net (in Chinese and English)

in Paris, France 26 July 2024 – 11 August 2024
- Competitors: 60 (26 men and 34 women) in 16 sports
- Flag bearers (opening): Sun Chen & Tai Tzu-ying
- Flag bearers (closing): Yang Chun-han & Lin Yu-ting
- Medals Ranked 35th: Gold 2 Silver 0 Bronze 5 Total 7

Summer Olympics appearances (overview)
- 1956; 1960; 1964; 1968; 1972; 1976–1980; 1984; 1988; 1992; 1996; 2000; 2004; 2008; 2012; 2016; 2020; 2024

Other related appearances
- Republic of China (1924–1948)

Taiwan, participating under the name Chinese Taipei, competed at the 2024 Summer Olympics in Paris from 26 July to 11 August 2024. It was Taiwan's eleventh consecutive appearance at the Summer Olympics.

== Medalists ==
Medal	Name	Sport	Event	Date
(gold) Gold	Lee Yang; Wang Chi-lin	Badminton	Men's doubles	August 4
(gold) Gold	Lin Yu-ting	Boxing	Women's 57 kg	August 10
(bronze) Bronze	Lee Meng-yuan	Shooting	Men's skeet	August 3
(bronze) Bronze	Wu Shih-yi	Boxing	Women's 60 kg	August 3
(bronze) Bronze	Tang Chia-hung	Gymnastics	Men's horizontal bar	August 5
(bronze) Bronze	Chen Nien-chin	Boxing	Women's 66 kg	August 6
(bronze) Bronze	Kuo Hsing-chun	Weightlifting	Women's 59 kg	August 8

Medals by sport
Sport	1st place, gold medalist(s)	2nd place, silver medalist(s)	3rd place, bronze medalist(s)	Total
Badminton	1	0	0	1
Boxing	1	0	2	3
Gymnastics	0	0	1	1
Shooting	0	0	1	1
Weightlifting	0	0	1	1
Total	2	0	5	7

Medals by gender
Gender	1st place, gold medalist(s)	2nd place, silver medalist(s)	3rd place, bronze medalist(s)	Total
Female	1	0	3	4
Male	1	0	2	3
Mixed	0	0	0	0
Total	2	0	5	7

Medals by date
Date	1st place, gold medalist(s)	2nd place, silver medalist(s)	3rd place, bronze medalist(s)	Total
3 August	0	0	2	2
4 August	1	0	0	1
5 August	0	0	1	1
6 August	0	0	1	1
8 August	0	0	1	1
10 August	1	0	0	1
Total	2	0	5	7

== Competitors ==
The following is the list of number of competitors in the Games.

Sport	Men	Women	Total
Archery	3	3	6
Athletics	3	1	4
Badminton	4	2	6
Boxing	2	4	6
Breaking	1	0	1
Canoeing	2	1	3
Fencing	1	0	1
Golf	2	2	4
Gymnastics	1	1	2
Judo	1	2	3
Shooting	2	6	8
Swimming	1	1	2
Table Tennis	3	3	6
Taekwondo	0	1	1
Tennis	0	4	4
Weightlifting	0	3	3
Total	26	34	60

== Archery ==
Six Taiwanese archers qualified for the 2024 Summer Olympics in the men's and women's recurve competitions by virtue of their results at the 2022 Asian Games; at the 2023 Asian Continental Qualification Tournament in Bangkok, Thailand; and at the 2024 Final Team Qualification Tournament in Antalya, Turkey. The national team selection competition concluded in January 2024.

Men

Athlete	Event	Ranking round		Round of 64	Round of 32	Round of 16	Quarter-finals	Semi-finals	Final / BM	
Athlete	Event	Score	Seed	Opposition Score	Opposition Score	Opposition Score	Opposition Score	Opposition Score	Opposition Score	Rank
Tai Yu-hsuan	Individual	665	24	Tekoniemi (FIN); W 6–0	Chirault (FRA); L 5–6	Did not advance				
Tang Chih-chun	Individual	665	25	Pangestu (INA); W 7–1	Gazoz (TUR); L 2–6	Did not advance				
Lin Zih-siang	Individual	662	32	Acha (ESP); W 6–2	Kim W-j (KOR); L 0–6	Did not advance				
Tai Yu-hsuan; Tang Chih-chun; Lin Zih-siang	Team	1992	5	—N/a		Great Britain; W 6–0	China; L 1–5	Did not advance		

Women

Athlete	Event	Ranking round		Round of 64	Round of 32	Round of 16	Quarter-finals	Semi-finals	Final / BM	
Athlete	Event	Score	Seed	Opposition Score	Opposition Score	Opposition Score	Opposition Score	Opposition Score	Opposition Score	Rank
Lei Chien-ying	Individual	652	29	Rendón (COL); W 7–1	Kaufhold (USA); W 7–3	Jeon (KOR); L 4–6	Did not advance			
Li Tsai-chi	Individual	646	40	Marchenko (UKR); L 4–6	Did not advance					
Chiu Yi-ching	Individual	628	53	Noda (JPN); L 0–6	Did not advance					
Lei Chien-ying; Li Tsai-chi; Chiu Yi-ching	Team	1926	9	—N/a		United States; W 5–1	South Korea; L 2–6	Did not advance		

Mixed

Athlete	Event	Ranking round		Round of 16	Quarter-finals	Semi-finals	Final / BM	
Athlete	Event	Score	Seed	Opposition Score	Opposition Score	Opposition Score	Opposition Score	Rank
Tai Yu-hsuan; Lei Chien-ying	Team	=1317 SO SO score: W 19–18	16 q	South Korea; L 4–5	Did not advance			

== Athletics ==
Taiwanese track and field athletes achieved the entry standards for Paris 2024, either by passing the direct qualifying mark (or time for track and road races) or by world ranking, in the following events (a maximum of 3 athletes each):

Key

- Note–Ranks given for track events are within the athlete's heat only
- Q = Qualified for the next round
- q = Qualified for the next round as a fastest loser or, in field events, by position without achieving the qualifying target
- NR = National record
- N/A = Round not applicable for the event
- Bye = Athlete not required to compete in round

Track and road events

Athlete	Event	Preliminary round		Round 1		Rechechage		Semifinal		Final	
Athlete	Event	Result	Rank	Result	Rank	Result	Rank	Result	Rank	Result	Rank
Yang Chun-han	Men's 200 m	—N/a		20.83	36	20.73	14	Did not advance			
Peng Ming-yang	Men's 400 m hurdles	—N/a		DNF	—	Did not advance					
Zhang Bo-ya	Women's 100 m	11.99	14 Q	11.88	62	—N/a		Did not advance			

Field events

Athlete	Event	Qualification		Final	
Athlete	Event	Result	Rank	Result	Rank
Lin Yu-tang	Men's long jump	7.70	22	Did not advance	

== Badminton ==
Chinese Taipei entered six badminton players into the Olympic tournament based on the BWF Race to Paris Rankings.

Athlete	Event	Group stage					Elimination	Quarter-final	Semi-final	Final / BM	
Athlete	Event	Opposition Score	Opposition Score	Opposition Score	Opposition Score	Rank	Opposition Score	Opposition Score	Opposition Score	Opposition Score	Rank
Chou Tien-chen	Men's singles	Garrido (MEX); W 2–0	Lee (HKG); W 2–0	—N/a		1	Naraoka (JPN); W 2–0	Sen (IND); L 1–2	Did not advance		5
Lee Yang; Wang Chi-lin	Men's doubles	Hoki / Kobayashi (JPN); W 2–0	Astrup / Rasmussen (DEN); W 2–1	Chiu / Yuan (USA); W 2–0	Liu / Ou (CHN); W 2–1	1	—N/a	Jomkoh / Kedren (THA); W 2–0	Astrup / Rasmussen (DEN); W 2–1	Liang / Wang (CHN); W 2–1	1st place, gold medalist(s)
Tai Tzu-ying	Women's singles	Tan (BEL); W 2–0	Intanon (THA); L 0–2	—N/a		2	Did not advance				
Ye Hong-wei; Lee Chia-hsin	Mixed doubles	Tang / Tse (HKG); L 0–2	Watanabe / Higashino (JPN); L 0–2	Christiansen / Bøje (DEN); W W/O	—N/a	3	Did not advance				

== Boxing ==
Chinese Taipei entered six boxers into the Olympic tournament. Four of them secured their spots in their respective division by virtue of their semifinal and final result at the 2022 Asian Games in Hangzhou, China. The other boxer, Chen Nien-chin (women's welterweight) qualified for the games, by winning the quota bouts round, at the 2024 World Olympic Qualification Tournament 1 in Busto Arsizio, Italy. Huang Hsiao-wen (women's bantamweight) secured her spots following the triumph in quota bouts round, at the 2024 World Olympic Qualification Tournament 2 in Bangkok, Thailand.

Athlete	Event	Round of 32	Round of 16	Quarter-finals	Semi-finals	Final	
Athlete	Event	Opposition Result	Opposition Result	Opposition Result	Opposition Result	Opposition Result	Rank
Lai Chu-en	Men's 63.5 kg	Bye	Bazarbayuly (KAZ); L 2–3	Did not advance			
Kan Chia-wei	Men's 71 kg	Bye	Jones (USA); L 0–5	Did not advance			
Huang Hsiao-wen	Women's 54 kg	Gojković (MNE); W 5–0	Petrova (BUL); L 1–4	Did not advance			
Lin Yu-ting	Women's 57 kg	Bye	Turdibekova (UZB); W 5–0	Staneva (BUL); W 5–0	Yıldız (TUR); W 5–0	Szeremeta (POL); W 5–0	1st place, gold medalist(s)
Wu Shih-yi	Women's 60 kg	Oh (KOR); W 5–0	Ogunsemilore (NGR); W DSQ	Palacios (ECU); W 4–1	Yang (CHN); L 0–5	Did not advance	3rd place, bronze medalist(s)
Chen Nien-chin	Women's 66 kg	Moronta (DOM); W 4–1	Santos (BRA); W 5–0	Khamidova (UZB); W 5–0	Yang (CHN); L 1–4	Did not advance	3rd place, bronze medalist(s)

== Breaking ==
Chinese Taipei entered one breakdancer to compete in the B-Boy dual battles for Paris 2024. Sun Chen (Quake) outlasted the male breakdancers from 2024 Olympic Qualifier Series in Shanghai, China and Budapest, Hungary.

Athlete	Nickname	Event	Qualification		Round of 16	Quarterfinal	Semifinal	Final / BM	
Athlete	Nickname	Event	Points	Rank	Opposition Result	Opposition Result	Opposition Result	Opposition Result	Rank
Sun Chen	Quake	B-Boys	26	3	Did not advance				

== Canoeing ==
=== Slalom ===
Chinese Taipei entered two single boats into the slalom competition, for the Games through the 2023 Asian Canoe Slalom Olympic Qualifiers.

Athlete	Event	Preliminary						Semifinal		Final	
Athlete	Event	Run 1	Rank	Run 2	Rank	Best	Rank	Time	Rank	Time	Rank
Wu Shao-hsuan	Men's K-1	101.22	20	99.45	19	99.45	23	Did not advance			
Chang Chu-han	Women's K-1	109.92	22	117.93	24	109.92	23	Did not advance			

Kayak cross

Athlete	Event	Time trial		Round 1	Repechage	Heat	Quarterfinal	Semifinal	Final	
Athlete	Event	Time	Rank	Position	Position	Position	Position	Position	Position	Rank
Wu Shao-hsuan	Men's KX-1	82.73	36	3 R	2 Q	3	Did not advance			23
Chang Chu-han	Women's KX-1	76.58	23	3 R	2 Q	4	Did not advance			30

=== Sprint ===
Chinese Taipei canoeists qualified one boat for the Games through the result of highest rank eligible nation's in the following events, through the 2024 Asian Sprint Canoeing Championships in Tokyo, Japan.

Athlete	Event	Heats		Quarter-finals		Semi-finals		Final	
Athlete	Event	Time	Rank	Time	Rank	Time	Rank	Time	Rank
Lai Kuan-chieh	Men's C-1 1000 m	4:01.26	4	3:58.79	4	Did not advance			

Qualification Legend: FA = Qualify to final (medal); FB = Qualify to final B (non-medal)

== Fencing ==
For the first time since 2012, Chinese Taipei entered one fencer into the Olympic competition. Chen Yi-tung qualified for the games by winning the gold medal in the men's individual foil event, at the 2024 Asia and Oceania Zonal Qualifying Tournament in Dubai, United Arab Emirates.

Athlete	Event	Round of 64	Round of 32	Round of 16	Quarter-final	Semi-final	Final / BM	
Athlete	Event	Opposition Score	Opposition Score	Opposition Score	Opposition Score	Opposition Score	Opposition Score	Rank
Chen Yi-tung	Men's foil	Wakim (LBN); W 15–13	Lefort (FRA); L 12–15	Did not advance				

== Golf ==
Chinese Taipei entered four golfers into the Olympic tournament. All of them qualified for the games in the men's and women's individual competitions, based on their respective world ranking position, through the release of the final top 60 ranked players, on the IGF World Rankings.

Athlete	Event	Round 1	Round 2	Round 3	Round 4	Total		
Athlete	Event	Score	Score	Score	Score	Score	Par	Rank
Pan Cheng-tsung	Men's	69	65	72	70	276	−8	T18
Kevin Yu	Men's	73	69	72	74	288	+4	52
Hsu Wei-ling	Women's	74	69	72	68	283	−5	T8
Pei-Yun Chien	Women's	76	71	71	68	286	−2	T18

== Gymnastics ==
=== Artistic ===
Chinese Taipei entered two gymnasts to compete at the games. Tang Chia-hung and Ting Hua-tien secured a quota place by virtue of becoming the highest eligible gymnast in their respective events, through the final ranking of 2024 FIG Artistic Gymnastics World Cup series.

Men

Athlete	Event	Qualification								Final							
Athlete	Event	Apparatus						Total	Rank	Apparatus						Total	Rank
Athlete	Event	F	PH	R	V	PB	HB	Total	Rank	F	PH	R	V	PB	HB	Total	Rank
Tang Chia-hung	Horizontal bar	—N/a					14.933	14.933	2	—N/a					13.966	13.966	3rd place, bronze medalist(s)

Women

Athlete	Event	Qualification						Final					
Athlete	Event	Apparatus				Total	Rank	Apparatus				Total	Rank
Athlete	Event	F	V	UB	BB	Total	Rank	F	V	UB	BB	Total	Rank
Ting Hua-tien	Balance beam	—N/a			12.533	12.533	50	Did not advance					

== Judo ==
Chinese Taipei qualified three judokas for the following weight classes at the Games. Yang Yung-wei (men's extra-lightweight, 60 kg), Lin Chen-hao (women's extra-lightweight, 48 kg) and Lien Chen-ling (women's lightweight, 57 kg) got qualified via quota based on IJF World Ranking List and continental quota based on Olympic point rankings.

Athlete	Event	Round of 32	Round of 16	Quarter-finals	Semi-finals	Repechage	Final / BM	
Athlete	Event	Opposition Result	Opposition Result	Opposition Result	Opposition Result	Opposition Result	Opposition Result	Rank
Yang Yung-wei	Men's −60 kg	Bye	Carlino (ITA); W 10–00	Smetov (KAZ); L 00–01	Did not advance	Nagayama (JPN); L 00–01	Did not advance	
Lin Chen-hao	Women's −48 kg	Lasso (COL); W 10–00	Abuzhakynova (KAZ); L 00–10	Did not advance				
Lien Chen-ling	Women's −57 kg	Koroma (SLE); W 10–00	Perišić (SRB); L 00–01	Did not advance				

== Shooting ==
Taiwanese shooters achieved quota places for the following events based on their results at the 2022 and 2023 ISSF World Championships, 2023 and 2024 Asian Championships, and 2024 ISSF World Olympic Qualification Tournament.

Athlete	Event	Qualification		Semifinal		Final	
Athlete	Event	Points	Rank	Points	Rank	Points	Rank
Yang Kun-pi	Men's trap	121	12	Did not advance			
Lee Meng-yuan	Men's skeet	124	3 Q	—N/a		45	3rd place, bronze medalist(s)
Liu Heng-yu	Women's 10 m air pistol	573	13	Did not advance			
Yu Ai-wen	Women's 10 m air pistol	564	35	Did not advance			
Tien Chia-chen	Women's 25 m pistol	581	16	Did not advance			
Wu Chia-ying	Women's 25 m pistol	572	31	Did not advance			
Liu Wan-yu	Women's trap	112	25	Did not advance			
Lin Yi-chun	Women's trap	110	26	Did not advance			

== Swimming ==
Taiwanese swimmers achieved the entry standards in the following events (a maximum of two swimmers under the Olympic Qualifying Time (OST) and potentially at the Olympic Consideration Time (OCT)).

Athlete	Event	Heat		Semifinal		Final	
Athlete	Event	Time	Rank	Time	Rank	Time	Rank
Wang Kuan-hung	Men's 200 m butterfly	1:55.32	8	1:55.07	11	Did not advance	
Han An-chi	Women's 200 m medley	DSQ		Did not advance			

== Table tennis ==
Chinese Taipei entered a full squad of male and female table tennis player into the Games, by advancing to the quarter-finals round, both in the men's and women's event, through the 2024 World Team Table Tennis Championships in Busan, South Korea; and through the allocations of mixed doubles world ranking. The players for the national team singles and team events are determined based on the ITTF world rankings as of 18 June 2024.

Men

Athlete	Event	Preliminary	Round of 64	Round of 32	Round of 16	Quarter-finals	Semi-finals	Final / BM	
Athlete	Event	Opposition Result	Opposition Result	Opposition Result	Opposition Result	Opposition Result	Opposition Result	Opposition Result	Rank
Lin Yun-ju	Singles	Bye	Afanador (PUR); W 4–1	Gaćina (CRO); W 4–0	Jorgić (SLO); W 4–0	Lebrun (FRA); L 3–4	Did not advance		
Kao Cheng-jui	Singles	Bye	Alamian (IRI); W 4–1	Ionescu (ROU); W 4–1	Möregårdh (SWE); L 1–4	Did not advance			
Chuang Chih-yuan; Kao Cheng-jui; Lin Yun-ju	Team	—N/a			Egypt; W 3–0	Japan; L 1–3	Did not advance		

Women

Athlete	Event	Preliminary	Round of 64	Round of 32	Round of 16	Quarter-finals	Semi-finals	Final / BM	
Athlete	Event	Opposition Result	Opposition Result	Opposition Result	Opposition Result	Opposition Result	Opposition Result	Opposition Result	Rank
Cheng I-ching	Singles	Bye	Hanffou (CMR); W 4–0	Samara (ROU); W 4–2	Bajor (POL); W 4–0	Sun (CHN); L 0–4	Did not advance		
Chien Tung-chuan	Singles	Bye	Zhu (HKG); L 0–4	Did not advance					
Chen Szu-yu; Cheng I-ching; Chien Tung-chuan	Team	—N/a			Australia; W 3–0	China; L 0–3	Did not advance		

Mixed

Athlete	Event	Round of 16	Quarter-final	Semi-final	Final / BM	
Athlete	Event	Opposition Result	Opposition Result	Opposition Result	Opposition Result	Rank
Lin Yun-ju; Chen Szu-yu	Doubles	Lebrun / Yuan (FRA); W 4–2	Wang / Sun (CHN); L 2–4	Did not advance		

== Taekwondo ==
Chinese Taipei qualified one athlete to compete at the games. Lo Chia-ling qualified for Paris 2024 by virtue of the re-allocation spots of olympics ranking in her division.

Athlete	Event	Round of 16	Quarterfinals	Semifinals	Repechage	Final / BM	
Athlete	Event	Opposition Result	Opposition Result	Opposition Result	Opposition Result	Opposition Result	Rank
Lo Chia-ling	Women's −57 kg	Aoun (LBN); L 0–2	Did not advance				

== Tennis ==
Chinese Taipei entered four tennis players into the Olympic tournament.

Athlete	Event	Round of 32	Round of 16	Quarter-finals	Semi-finals	Final / BM	
Athlete	Event	Opposition Score	Opposition Score	Opposition Score	Opposition Score	Opposition Score	Rank
Hsieh Su-wei; Tsao Chia-yi	Women's doubles	Begu / Niculescu (ROU); W 7–6^{(7–2)}, 7–5	Kostyuk / Yastremska (UKR); W WO	Muchová / Nosková (CZE); L 6–1, 4–6, [12–14]	Did not advance		
Chan Hao-ching; Latisha Chan	Women's doubles	Krejčíková / Siniaková (CZE); L 4–6, 0–6	Did not advance				

== Weightlifting ==
Chinese Taipei entered three weightlifters into the Olympic competition. Fang Wan-ling (women's 49 kg), Kuo Hsing-chun (women's 59 kg) and Chen Wen-huei (women's 71 kg) secured one of the top ten slots in their respective weight divisions based on the IWF Olympic Qualification Rankings.

Athlete	Event	Snatch		Clean & Jerk		Total	Rank
Athlete	Event	Result	Rank	Result	Rank	Total	Rank
Fang Wan-ling	Women's 49 kg	86	5	107	8	193	6
Kuo Hsing-chun	Women's 59 kg	105	4	130	3	235	3rd place, bronze medalist(s)
Chen Wen-huei	Women's 71 kg	103	8	133	5	236	6

== See also ==
- Chinese Taipei at the 2024 Summer Paralympics
- Chinese Taipei at the 2024 Winter Youth Olympics
