= Mădălina Amăistroaie =

Romanian archer (born 2002)

Personal information
- Full name: Mădălina Ștefania Amăistroaie
- Nationality: Romanian
- Born: 9 December 2002 (age 22); Suceava

Sport
- Sport: Archery

Mădălina Ștefania Amăistroaie (born 9 December 2002) is a Romanian archer. She competed in the women's individual event at the 2020 Summer Olympics and 2024 Summer Olympics.

She next competed in the 2024 Paris Olympics on 30 July 2024, and in the first knockout round defeated Mikaella Moshe of Israel, and in the next round defeated former World Games champion Chiara Rebagliati of Italy, before in the next round losing to Nam Su-hyeon of South Korea, who went on to win the silver medal.
