= Mikaella Moshe =

Israeli archer (born 2003)

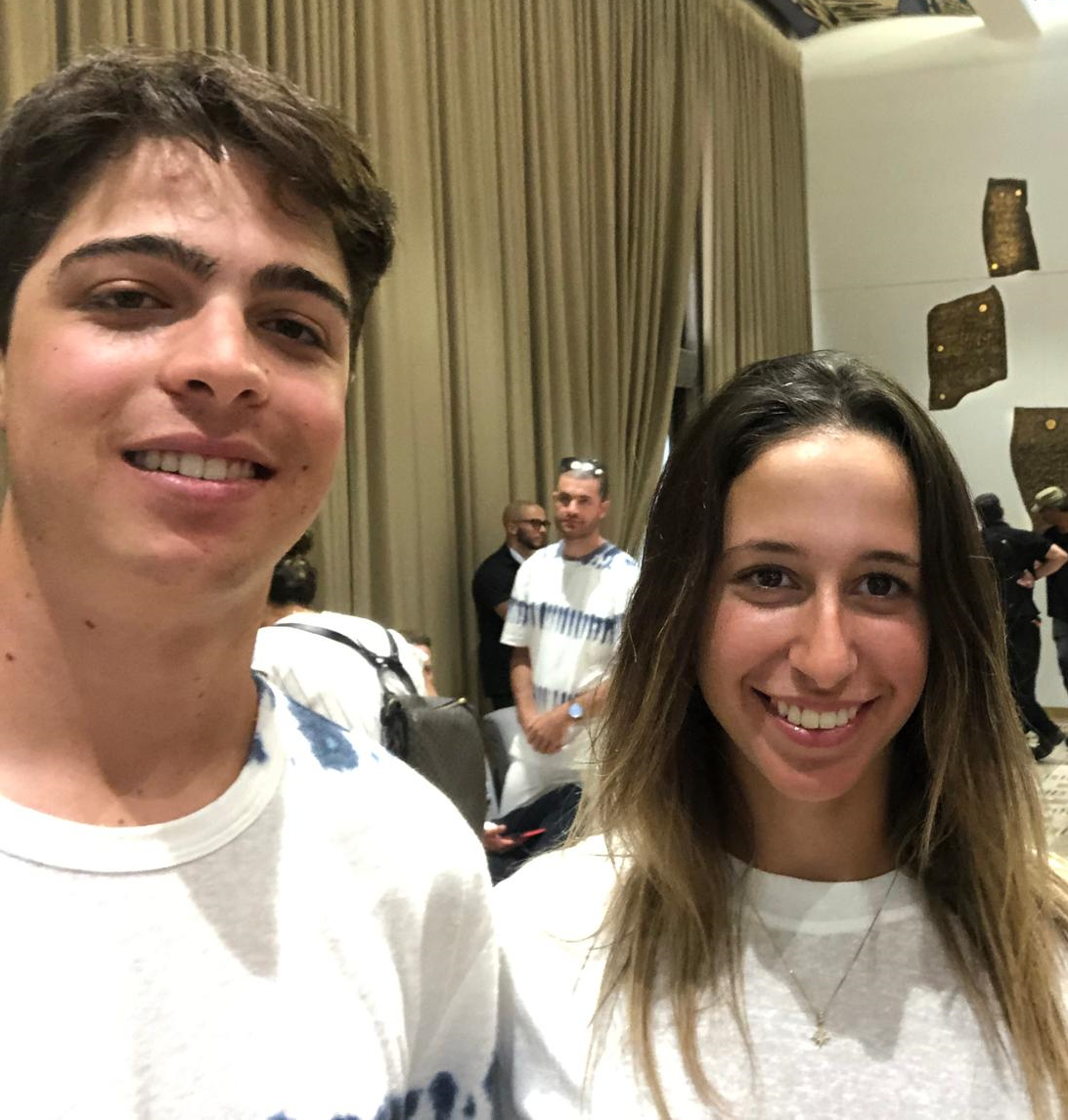
- Moshe (right) in 2024

Personal information
- Native name: מיכאלה משה
- National team: Israel
- Born: 4 December 2003 (age 22) Ramat Gan, Israel
- Home town: Ramat HaSharon, Israel

Sport
- Sport: Archery
- Event: Recurve
- Club: Maccabi Tel Aviv
- Coached by: Richard Priestman

Mikaella Moshe (Hebrew: מיכאלה משה; also spelled Michaela Moshe; born 4 December 2003) is an Israeli Olympic archer. Formerly an elite rhythmic gymnast, she started practising archery in 2022. She represented Israel at the 2024 Paris Olympics in the women's individual archery event, where she came in 33rd, and in the Mixed team with Roy Dror, where they came in 18th.

== Early life ==
Moshe was born in Ramat Gan, Israel. She lives in Ramat HaSharon in Israel.

== Rhythmic gymnastics career ==
Introduced to the sport at four years of age, Moshe trained for 15 years as an elite rhythmic gymnast, and was an alternate on Israel's European Championship rhythmic gymnastics team. She came in 14th in the 2021 Irina Deleanu Rhythmic Gymnastics Cup, on 23 May 2021, competing for Maccabi Petach Tikva, and that same year she came in fifth in the 2021 Israeli Rhythmic Gymnastics Championships.

== Archery career ==
Moshe started practicing archery in late 2022, less than two years prior to the 2024 Paris Olympic Games. Her world ranking in June 2023 was 597.

In February 2024, Moshe came in 8th in the 2024 European Indoor Archery Championships in Varaždin, Croatia. In May 2024, she came in 9th in the 2024 European Archery Championships in Essen, Germany.

As of July 2024, Moshe was ranked 38th in the world; her highest world rank was 34th, in May 2024. She is coached by Richard Priestman, a British former Olympic medalist archer and current archery coach. She trains in Israel for eight hours a day, six days a week, in temperatures during the summer months of between 35 and 45 °C (95 and 113 °F), and trains at the Wingate Institute. She competes for Maccabi Tel Aviv.

=== 2024 Paris Olympics ===
Moshe represented Israel at the 2024 Paris Olympics in the Women's individual archery event in the gardens of Les Invalides, and at 20 years of age is the first female Israeli Olympic archer in Israel's history. On 25 July 2024, competing in the ranking round in the women's individual recurve archery competition at the 2024 Paris Olympics, she scored 660 points and came in 18th place out of 64 competitors, shooting 72 arrows from a distance of 70 meters (230 feet). With that score, she set a new Israeli record, breaking the previous Israeli record of 642, which she had set in March 2024. She competed with torn ligaments in her shoulder, which she plans to have surgery on after the Paris Olympics.

She competed in the individual competition in the first knockout round and lost to Mădălina Amăistroaie of Romania, coming in 33rd. Moshe competed in the Mixed team with Roy Dror, where they came in 18th with a score of 1345, two points shy of advancing to the competition round, and directly behind the Dutch team of Steve Wijler and Gabriela Schloesser who had won a silver medal at the Tokyo Olympics three years prior.
