= Ana Paula Vázquez =

Mexican archer (born 2000)

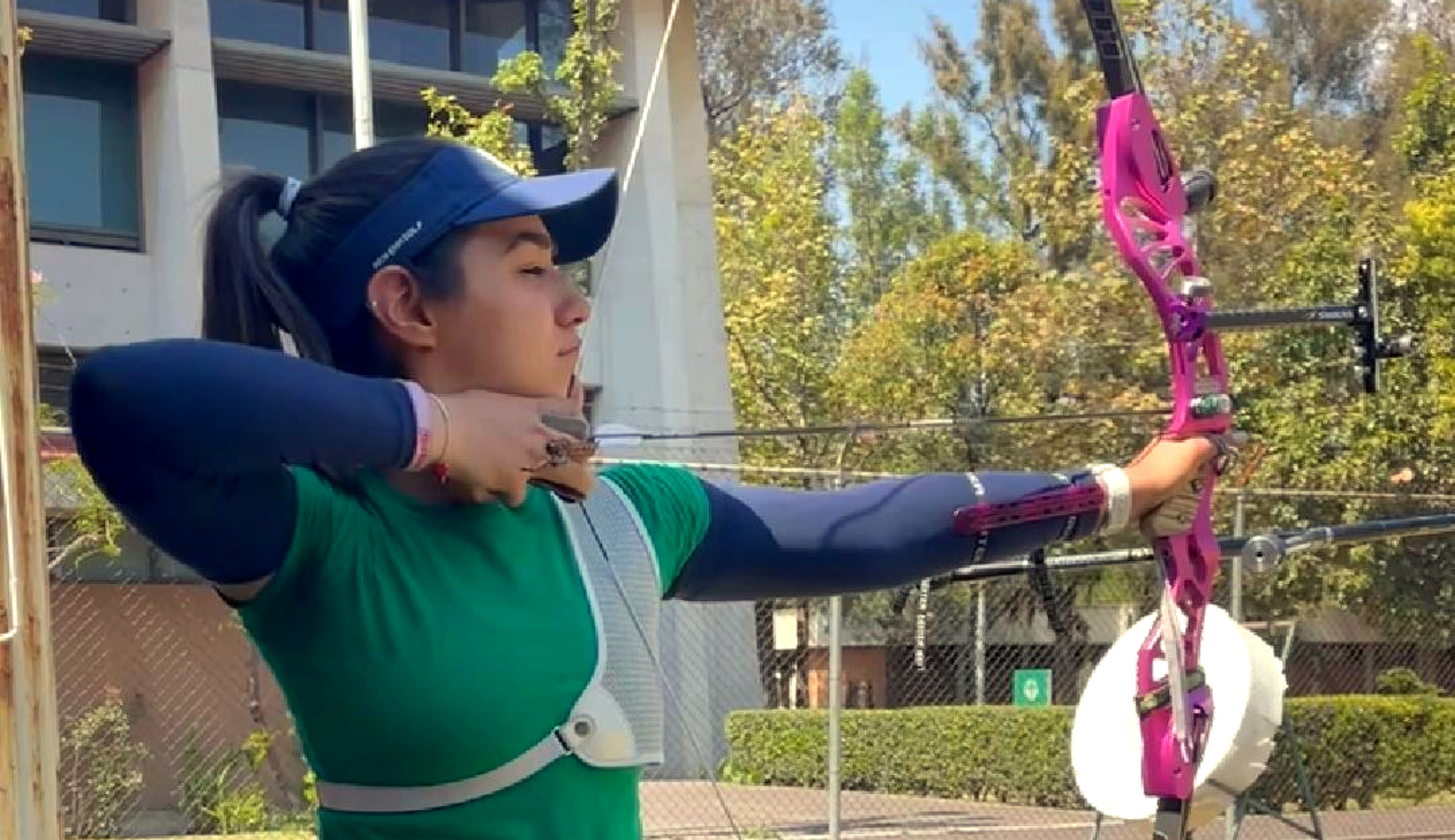
- Vázquez in 2022

Personal information
- Full name: Ana Paula Vázquez Flores
- Born: 5 October 2000 (age 25) Ramos Arizpe, Coahuila, Mexico

Sport
- Country: Mexico
- Sport: Archery
Medal record
Women's archery
Representing Mexico
Olympic Games
Bronze medal – third place	2024 Paris	Team
World Championships
Silver medal – second place	2021 Yankton	Team
World Youth Championships
Silver medal – second place	2019 Madrid	Individual
World Cup
Gold medal – first place	2021 Guatemala City	Mixed team
Silver medal – second place	2018 Salt Lake City	Team
Silver medal – second place	2021 Guatemala City	Team
Silver medal – second place	2021 Lausanne	Team
Silver medal – second place	2021 Paris	Team
Silver medal – second place	2026 Antalya	Individual
Silver medal – second place	2026 Antalya	Team
Bronze medal – third place	2026 Puebla	Team
Pan American Championships
Gold medal – first place	2021 Monterrey	Team
Gold medal – first place	2022 Santiago	Individual
Gold medal – first place	2022 Santiago	Team
Silver medal – second place	2024 Medellín	Team
Silver medal – second place	2026 Tlaxcala	Team
Bronze medal – third place	2021 Monterrey	Individual
Central American and Caribbean Games
Gold medal – first place	2026 Santo Domingo	Team
Silver medal – second place	2026 Santo Domingo	Individual

Ana Paula Vázquez Flores (Note: In this Spanish name, the first or paternal surname is Vázquez and the second or maternal family name is Flores.) (born 5 October 2000) is a Mexican archer. She competed in the women's individual event at the 2020 Summer Olympics held in Tokyo, Japan. Two months later, she won the silver medal in the women's team event at the 2021 World Archery Championships held in Yankton, United States. Additionally, she won the bronze medal in the women's team event at the 2024 Summer Olympics.
