= Archery at the 2024 Summer Olympics – Women's team =

Women's team at the Games of the XXXIII Olympiad
- Venue: Les Invalides
- Date: 25 July 2024 (ranking round); 28 July 2024 (match play)
- Competitors: 36 from 12 nations

Medalists
1st place, gold medalist(s)		Jeon Hun-young; Lim Si-hyeon; Nam Su-hyeon	South Korea
2nd place, silver medalist(s)		An Qixuan; Li Jiaman; Yang Xiaolei	China
3rd place, bronze medalist(s)		Ángela Ruiz; Alejandra Valencia; Ana Paula Vázquez	Mexico

The women's team archery event is one of five archery events held at the 2024 Summer Olympics. It was held at Les Invalides, with the ranking round taking place on 25 July and match play on 28 July. This was the 10th consecutive appearance of the event, which has been held every Games since 1988.

The gold medal was won by South Korea, who set an Olympic record for 2,046 points scored in the ranking round. This was their tenth straight title, having won every women's team archery competition at the Olympics. They defeated China in the final, requiring a shoot-out to capture gold. Mexico won the bronze medal over the Netherlands.

== Qualification ==
=== Qualified teams ===
Event	Location	Qualified NOC
Team – 12 teams, 36 female archers
Host nation	—N/a	France
2023 World Archery Championships	(Germany) Berlin	Germany; Mexico
2023 Asian Archery Championships	(Thailand) Bangkok	South Korea
2024 Pan American Archery Championships	(Colombia) Medellín	United States
2024 European Archery Championships	(Germany) Essen	Netherlands
Final Team Qualification Tournament (Note: France finished in the top three at the World Championships, so an additional team quota space is allocated to the Final Team Qualification Tournament.)	(Turkey) Antalya	China; Malaysia; Great Britain; Chinese Taipei
WA World Olympic Ranking List	—N/a	India; Indonesia

== Competition format ==
Each team first participated in the Ranking Round; 216 arrows were fired, and the scores were tallied up. The four highest ranking teams on the list received a bye to the quarter-finals; the rest began in the preliminary round. From there, the tournament proceeded in a single-elimination format.

== Records ==
Prior to this competition, the existing world and Olympic records were as follows.

- 216 arrow ranking round

World record	South Korea; Chang Hye-jin, Kang Chae-young, Lee Eun-kyung	2053	Antalya, Turkey	21 May 2018
Olympic record	South Korea; An San, Jang Min-hee, Kang Chae-young	2032	Tokyo, Japan	23 July 2021

The following record was established during the competition:

Date	Event	Name	Nation	Score	Record
25 July	Ranking round	Jeon Hun-young; Lim Si-hyeon; Nam Su-hyeon	South Korea	2046	OR

== Schedule ==
All times are Central European Summer Time (UTC+2)

The schedule for the women's team event covers two separate days of competition.

Date	Time	Round
25 July 2024	9:30	Ranking round
28 July 2024	9:30; 14:15; 15:47; 16:48; 17:11	Round of 16; Quarter-finals; Semi-finals; Bronze medal match Gold medal match

== Results ==
=== Ranking round ===
The ranking round was held on the morning of 25 July 2024 at Les Invalides, Paris.

Q : qualified for quarter-finals; q: qualified for round of 16.; OR: Olympic record

Rank	Nation	Archers	Score	10s	Xs	Notes
1	South Korea	Jeon Hun-young; Lim Si-hyeon; Nam Su-hyeon	2046 (OR)	123	42	Q
2	China	An Qixuan; Li Jiaman; Yang Xiaolei	1996	96	31	Q
3	Mexico	Ángela Ruiz; Alejandra Valencia; Ana Paula Vázquez	1986	88	36	Q
4	India	Ankita Bhakat; Bhajan Kaur; Deepika Kumari	1983	83	21	Q
5	France	Lisa Barbelin; Amélie Cordeau; Caroline Lopez	1972	77	28	q
6	Germany	Katharina Bauer; Michelle Kroppen; Charline Schwarz	1965	77	25	q
7	Indonesia	Diananda Choirunisa; Syifa Nurafifah Kamal; Rezza Octavia	1960	75	28	q
8	United States	Catalina GNoriega; Casey Kaufhold; Jennifer Mucino-Fernandez	1945	71	21	q
9	Chinese Taipei	Chiu Yi-ching; Lei Chien-ying; Li Tsai-chi	1926	68	21	q
10	Malaysia	Syaqiera Mashayikh; Nurul Fazil; Ariana Zairi	1918	57	18	q
11	Great Britain	Megan Havers; Penny Healey; Bryony Pitman	1912	60	25	q
12	Netherlands	Quinty Roeffen; Gabriela Schloesser; Laura van der Winkel	1897	57	25	q

=== Competition bracket ===
Round of 16
8	United States	1	53	52	48
9	Chinese Taipei	5	53	55	54
5	France	0	49	51	51
12	Netherlands	6	55	56	54
6	Germany	6	56	56	53
11	Great Britain	0	48	54	51
7	Indonesia	5	54	47	53	52
10	Malaysia	3	52	55	51	52

Quarter-finals
1	South Korea	6	52	52	54	56
9	Chinese Taipei	2	51	56	53	54
12	Netherlands	6	52	54	53
4	India	0	51	49	48
3	Mexico	5	50	55	56
6	Germany	1	50	49	55
7	Indonesia	1	54	49	47
2	China	5	54	54	53

Semi-finals
1	South Korea	5	57	52	57	59	26
12	Netherlands	4	53	53	58	51	23
3	Mexico	3	47	55	48	55
2	China	5	53	52	56	55

Gold medal match
1	South Korea	5	56	55	51	53	29
2	China	4	53	54	54	55	27
Bronze medal match
12	Netherlands	2	50	56	52	52
3	Mexico	6	57	54	56	57

- The figure in italics signifies the set scores.
