= Marie Horáčková =

Czech archer (born 1997)

Personal information
- Born: 24 December 1997 (age 28) Plzeň, Czech Republic

Sport
- Country: Czech Republic
- Sport: Archery
Medal record
Women's recurve archery
World Championships
Gold medal – first place	2023 Berlin	Individual

Marie Horáčková (Czech pronunciation: [ˈmarɪjɛ ˈɦoraːtʃkovaː]; born 24 December 1997) is a Czech archer. She competed in the women's individual event at the 2020 Summer Olympics.

== Career ==
On 6 August 2023, Horáčková became the first Czech Republic athlete to win a recurve bow Individual title. She defeated Alejandra Valencia to win the gold medal at the 2023 World Archery Championships held in Berlin, Germany. With the win, Horáčková qualified for the 2024 Summer Olympics.

== Awards ==
She was voted Czech "Lukostřelec roku" (Archer of the year) in 2018, 2019 (joint winner with Erik Ebermann), 2020, and 2021. In 2022, she reached the second place.

== Personal life ==
Her mother was Barbora Horáčková, another Czech Olympic archer.

Olympic Games
Preceded by Petra Kvitová; Tomáš Satoranský	Flagbearer for Czech Republic (with Lukáš Krpálek); Paris 2024	Succeeded by incumbent
