= Lin Zih-siang =

Taiwanese archer (born 2001), 2024 Olympic athlete

Lin Zih-Siang
Personal information
- Full name: 林子翔
- Born: 1 August 2001 (age 25)

Sport
- Country: Taiwan
- Sport: Archery
- Event: Recurve
- Coached by: Liu Zhanming
Medal record
Men's recurve archery
Representing Chinese Taipei
Asian Games
Bronze medal – third place	2026 Aichi–Nagoya	Team

Lin Zih-Siang (Chinese: 林子翔; pinyin: Lín Zixiáng; born 1 August 2001) is a Taiwanese archer competing in men's recurve events. In 2023 he qualified for the 2024 Olympics winning gold in the Asian Continental Qualification Tournament in Bangkok. In 2024, he represented Chinese Taipei at the 2024 Summer Olympics in Paris, France in the Men's individual and team events. He was eliminated in the individual even in the round of 32 and the Chinese Taipei team was after reaching the quarterfinals.
