= An Qixuan =

Chinese archer (born 2000)

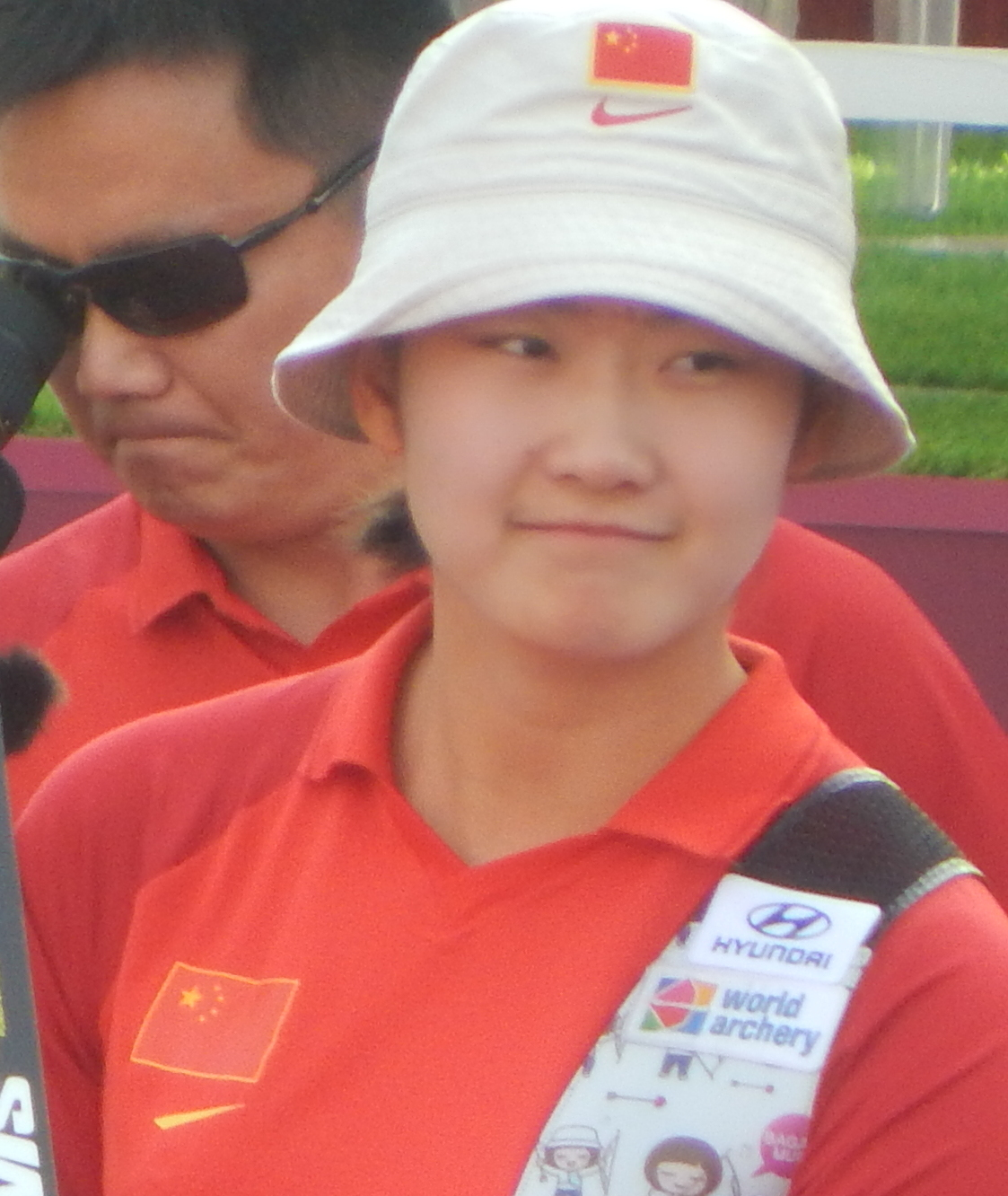
- An in 2019

Personal information
- Born: 12 March 2000 (age 26) Changji, Xinjiang, China

Sport
- Country: China
- Sport: Archery
- Event: Recurve
- Coached by: Long Linqiao, Kwon Yong Hak
Medal record
Women's recurve archery
Representing China
Olympic Games
Silver medal – second place	2024 Paris	Team
Asian Games
Silver medal – second place	2022 Hangzhou	Team
Asian Championships
Silver medal – second place	2023 Bangkok	Team

An Qixuan (Chinese: 安琦轩; pinyin: Ān Qíxuān; born 3 December 2000) is a Chinese archer competing in women's recurve events. She competed at the 2024 Summer Olympics and subsequently won a silver medal.

== Career ==
She was runner-up in her debut World Cup appearance in Shanghai, in 2018. In 2019, she finished fourth in the Archery World Cup Final. However, after that she was unable to compete internationally for four years as the Chinese team didn't travel abroad due to the COVID-19 pandemic.

After her return to international competition, she won an individual gold medal in the recurve competitions at the third leg of the 2023 Asia Cup in Singapore. In October 2023, she was a silver medalist in the team event at the delayed 2022 Asian Games in Hangzhou. In November 2023. She was a silver medalist in the team event at the 2023 Asian Archery Championships in Bangkok.

She was part of the Chinese women’s recurve team that won the World Cup recurve women's team final in Shanghai in April 2024. They then also won the Archery World Cup 2024 event in Yecheon, Republic of Korea in May 2024.

Her Chinese women's team earned qualification for the 2024 Summer Games at the final qualifier in Antalya, Türkiye in June 2023. She was subsequently named in their team for the 2024 Paris Olympics.
