= Lim Si-hyeon =

South Korean archer (born 2003)

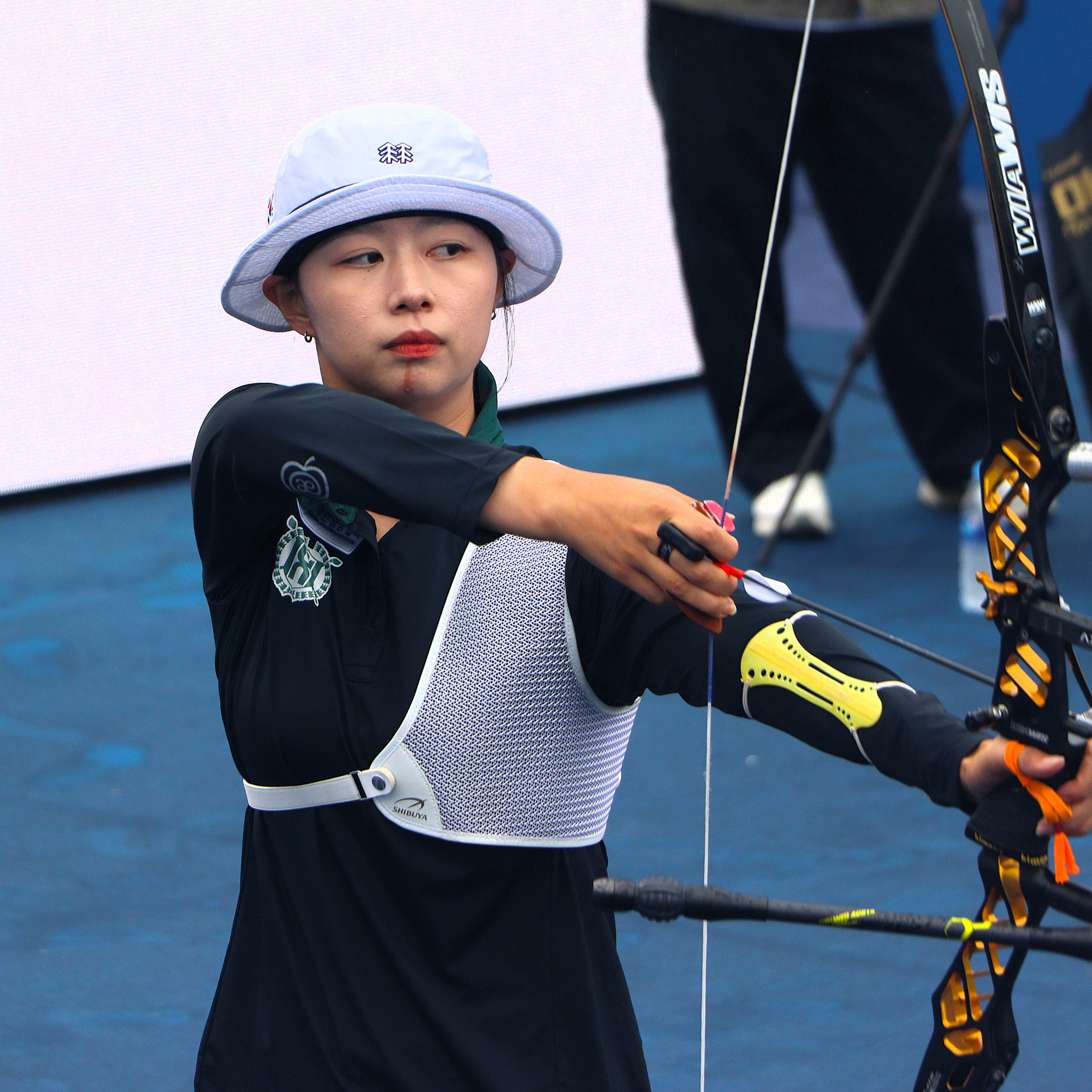
- Lim in 2025

Personal information
- Full name: 임시현
- National team: South Korea
- Born: 13 June 2003 (age 23) Gangneung, South Korea

Sport
- Sport: Archery
Medal record
Women's recurve archery
Representing South Korea
Olympic Games
Gold medal – first place	2024 Paris	Individual
Gold medal – first place	2024 Paris	Team
Gold medal – first place	2024 Paris	Mixed team
World Championships
Gold medal – first place	2023 Berlin	Mixed team
Bronze medal – third place	2025 Gwangju	Team
Asian Games
Gold medal – first place	2022 Hangzhou	Individual
Gold medal – first place	2022 Hangzhou	Team
Gold medal – first place	2022 Hangzhou	Mixed team
Asian Championships
Gold medal – first place	2023 Bangkok	Team
Gold medal – first place	2023 Bangkok	Mixed team
Silver medal – second place	2023 Bangkok	Individual
World Cup
Gold medal – first place	2023 Shanghai	Individual
Gold medal – first place	2023 Shanghai	Team
Gold medal – first place	2023 Medellín	Individual
Gold medal – first place	2023 Medellín	Team
Gold medal – first place	2023 Paris	Team
Gold medal – first place	2023 Paris	Mixed team
Gold medal – first place	2024 Shanghai	Individual
Gold medal – first place	2024 Shanghai	Mixed team
Gold medal – first place	2024 Yecheon	Individual
Gold medal – first place	2024 Antalya	Team
Gold medal – first place	2025 Shanghai	Team
Gold medal – first place	2025 Shanghai	Mixed team
Gold medal – first place	2025 Antalya	Mixed team
Gold medal – first place	2025 Antalya	Individual
Gold medal – first place	2025 Madrid	Team
Silver medal – second place	2023 Medellín	Mixed team
Silver medal – second place	2024 Shanghai	Team
Silver medal – second place	2024 Yecheon	Team
Silver medal – second place	2025 Shanghai	Individual
Silver medal – second place	2025 Madrid	Mixed team
Bronze medal – third place	2023 Hermosillo	Individual
Bronze medal – third place	2025 Antalya	Team

Lim Si-hyeon (Korean: 임시현; born 13 June 2003) is a South Korean archer. She won three gold medals at the 2024 Summer Olympics in the individual, team and mixed team events. By virtue of winning all three gold medals in the same Olympic Games, Lim became the second person to do so, matching her compatriot, An San, at the 2020 Summer Olympics. She also set the world & Olympic records in the preliminary round of the women's individual event, scoring 694 out of a maximum of 720, thereby surpassing fellow South Korean Kang Chae-young's 692 and An San's 680, respectively.

== Early life and education ==
Lim is from Gangneung, South Korea. She attended No-am Elementary School, where she first began archery as an after-school activity in the third grade. She left her hometown for Seoul to attend Seoul Physical Education High School. She graduated from Korea National Sport University.

== Career ==
Lim won three gold medals at the 2022 Asian Games.

During the second stage of the 2023 Archery World Cup where Lim made her debut in the World Cup, she won the gold medals for the women's individual event and the women's team with An San and Kang Chae-young. In the third stage, Lim defended both her gold medals for the women's individual and team event with An and Kang. She also won the silver medal with Kim Woo-jin in the mixed team event. In the fourth stage, Lim only won the gold medal for the team event with An and Kang and also won the gold medal in the mixed team event with Lee Woo-seok. In the final stage, Lim won the bronze medal in the women's individual event. Lim was named the most accurate archers alongside Lee Woo-seok for the Archery World Cup with a total of 208 10s among the women archers.

Lim Si-hyeon participated in 2023 World Archery Championships finished 8° in the individual event and reached only the second round in team event.

During the 2024 Archery World Cup, Lim won another two gold medals for women's individual for the second and third stages, one gold medal as part of the women's team with Jeon Hun-young and Nam Su-hyeon in the third stage and the mixed team's gold medal with Kim Woo-jin in the first stage.

In 2024, Lim made her Olympics debut after winning the national team trials in April to qualify for the 2024 Summer Olympics.

During the 2024 Summer Olympics, Lim shot 694, breaking the world record of 692 set by Kang in 2019 at 's-Hertogenbosch, Netherlands, as well as the Olympic record of 680 set by An San during the 2020 Summer Olympics. As the women's team, Jeon Hun-young, Nam Su-hyeon and Lim scored a total of 2,046 in women’s 216 arrows, breaking the previous Olympic record of 2,032 set by South Korea’s An San, Jang Min-hee and Kang Chae-young at the 2020 Summer Olympics. As the mixed team with Kim Woo-jin, they scored a total of 1,380 in mixed 144 arrows, breaking the previous Olympic record of 1,368 set by South Korea’s An San and Kim Je-deok at the 2020 Summer Olympics.

Lim won three gold medals at the 2024 Summer Olympics in the individual, team and mixed team events, becoming just the second archer in history, after An San in the 2020 Summer Olympics, to do so.
