= Bhajan Kaur =

Indian archer (born 2005)

Personal information
- Nationality: Indian
- Born: 26 August 2005 (age 21) Ellenabad, Haryana, India

Sport
- Sport: Archery
Medal record
Women's recurve archery
Representing India
Asian Games
Bronze medal – third place	2022 Hangzhou	Team
Asian Championships
Bronze medal – third place	2023 Bangkok	Team
World Youth Championships
Bronze medal – third place	2023 Limerick	Individual

Bhajan Kaur (born 26 August 2005) is an Indian archer from Haryana. She was selected for the Indian Archery team for the recurve events at the 2022 Asian Games held in Hangzhou, China. Along with Ankita Bhakat and Simranjeet Kaur, she won the Women's team recurve event bronze medal for India. The Indian trio defeated the Vietnamese team 6–2 in the bronze-medal play-off. On 16 June 2024, she won a gold in the final Olympic qualifier at Anatalya, Turkey. She represented India at the 2024 Summer Olympic Games at Paris.

== Early life ==
Kaur hails from Ellenabad, Sirsa, Haryana. She did her schooling at Nachiketan Public School, Ellenabad. She is supported by Olympic Gold Quest. Her father Bhagawan Singh is a farmer, and she has a brother and a sister.

== Career ==
- 2023: In August, she was part of the Indian recurve team that won a bronze at the Hyundai Archery World Cup in Paris, France.
- 2023: In July, she won a bronze at the Youth World Championships held in Limerick, Ireland. She defeated Su Hsin-Yu of Chinese Taipei 7–1 (28–25, 27–27, 29–25, 30–26) in the U-21 women's recurve individual section.
- 2023: In June, she finished in the top 10 at the Archery World Cup Stage 3 held in Medellin, Colombia.
- 2023: In April, she made it to the semifinals of the Archery World Cup in Antalya, Turkey. On 21 April in the quarterfinals, Bhajan toppled the top seed, the Mexican archer Alejandra Valencia by 6–5.

=== 2024 Summer Olympics ===
Kaur made her first Olympic appearance in the 2024 Summer Olympics in Paris. She progressed to the Women's Individual 1/8 Elimination Round. However, she lost 5–6 to Indonesia's Diananda Choirunisa in a Shoot-Off. Kaur advanced to the quarterfinals in the Women's Team, along with Ankita Bhakat and Deepika Kumari. However, the team lost to the Netherlands' team 0–6.
