= Syifa Nurafifah Kamal =

Indonesian recurve archer (born 1991)

Personal information
- Born: 1 October 1991 (age 34) Bandung, West Java, Indonesia

Sport
- Country: Indonesia
- Sport: Archery
- Event: Recurve

Syifa Nurafifah Kamal (born 1 October 1991) is an Indonesian recurve archer. She represented Indonesia at the 2024 Summer Olympics, in the women's individual and team category.

== Career ==
She started archery in 2005 after being persuaded by her father. She has won 1 gold medal at the 2012 National Sports Week and two gold medals at the 2016 edition in her hometown Bandung.
