= Alejandra Valencia =

Mexican archer (born 1994)

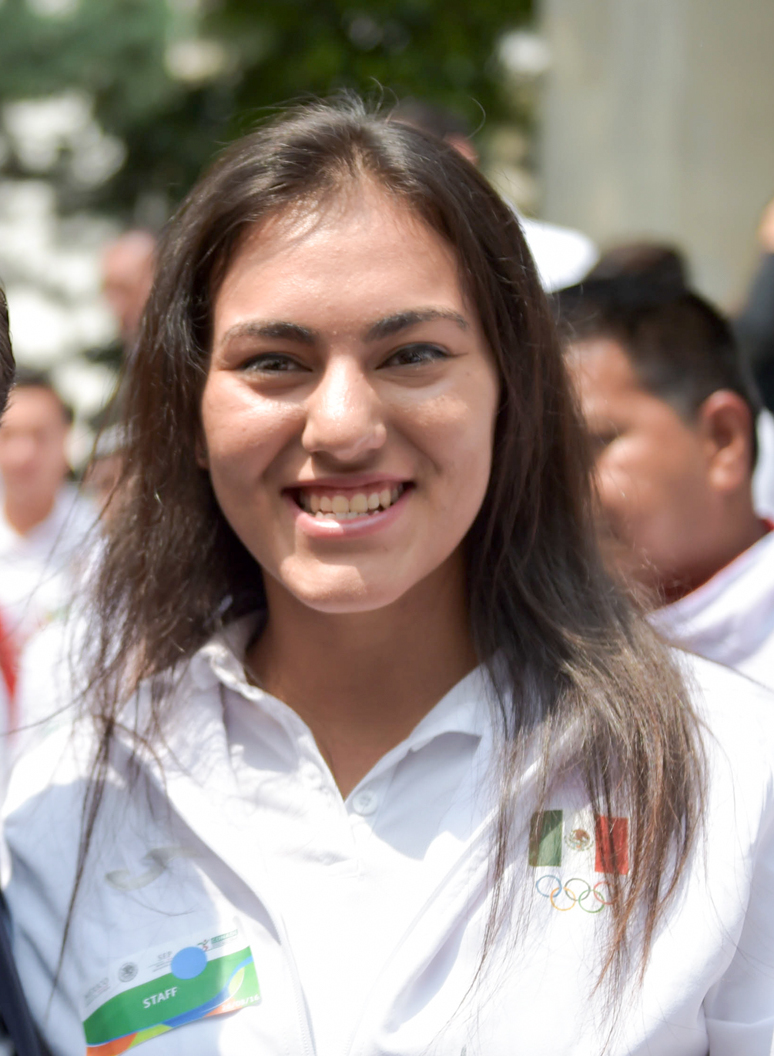
- Valencia in 2016

Personal information
- Full name: Alejandra Valencia Trujillo
- Nationality: Mexican
- Born: 17 October 1994 (age 31) Hermosillo, Sonora, Mexico
- Height: 176 cm (5 ft 9 in)
- Weight: 73 kg (161 lb)

Sport
- Country: Mexico
- Sport: Archery
- Coached by: Miguel Ángel Flores
Medal record
Women's recurve archery
Representing Mexico
Olympic Games
Bronze medal – third place	2020 Tokyo	Mixed team
Bronze medal – third place	2024 Paris	Team
World Championships
Silver medal – second place	2017 Mexico City	Team
Silver medal – second place	2021 Yankton	Team
Silver medal – second place	2023 Berlin	Individual
Bronze medal – third place	2023 Berlin	Team
Pan American Games
Gold medal – first place	2011 Guadalajara	Individual
Gold medal – first place	2011 Guadalajara	Team
Gold medal – first place	2019 Lima	Individual
Gold medal – first place	2023 Santiago	Individual
Silver medal – second place	2015 Toronto	Team
Silver medal – second place	2019 Lima	Team
Silver medal – second place	2023 Santiago	Team
Bronze medal – third place	2019 Lima	Mixed team
Bronze medal – third place	2023 Santiago	Mixed team
World Cup
Gold medal – first place	2023 Antalya	Team
Gold medal – first place	2024 Yecheon	Mixed team
Gold medal – first place	2025 Central Florida	Mixed team
Silver medal – second place	2012 Ogden	Team
Silver medal – second place	2014 Wrocław	Team
Silver medal – second place	2017 Berlin	Individual
Silver medal – second place	2017 Berlin	Team
Silver medal – second place	2018 Salt Lake City	Team
Silver medal – second place	2019 Antalya	Team
Silver medal – second place	2021 Guatemala City	Team
Silver medal – second place	2021 Lausanne	Team
Silver medal – second place	2021 Paris	Team
Silver medal – second place	2025 Central Florida	Individual
Silver medal – second place	2026 Antalya	Team
Bronze medal – third place	2011 Ogden	Individual
Bronze medal – third place	2011 Shanghai	Team
Bronze medal – third place	2012 Ogden	Individual
Bronze medal – third place	2012 Antalya	Mixed team
Bronze medal – third place	2013 Wrocław	Individual
Bronze medal – third place	2016 Medellín	Team
Bronze medal – third place	2021 Guatemala City	Individual
Bronze medal – third place	2021 Lausanne	Mixed team
Bronze medal – third place	2021 Paris	Mixed team
Bronze medal – third place	2024 Yecheon	Individual
Bronze medal – third place	2024 Antalya	Individual
Bronze medal – third place	2026 Puebla	Team
World Cup Final
Silver medal – second place	2015 Mexico City	Mixed team
Silver medal – second place	2023 Hermosillo	Individual
Bronze medal – third place	2024 Tlaxcala	Individual
Pan American Championships
Gold medal – first place	2010 Guadalajara	Individual
Gold medal – first place	2010 Guadalajara	Team
Gold medal – first place	2018 Medellín	Individual
Gold medal – first place	2021 Monterrey	Team
Gold medal – first place	2022 Santiago	Team
Gold medal – first place	2022 Santiago	Mixed team
Gold medal – first place	2026 Tlaxcala	Mixed team
Silver medal – second place	2018 Medellín	Team
Silver medal – second place	2024 Medellín	Individual
Silver medal – second place	2024 Medellín	Team
Silver medal – second place	2024 Medellín	Mixed team
Silver medal – second place	2026 Tlaxcala	Team
Bronze medal – third place	2018 Medellín	Mixed team
Central American and Caribbean Games
Gold medal – first place	2023 San Salvador	Individual
Gold medal – first place	2023 San Salvador	Team
Gold medal – first place	2023 San Salvador	Mixed team
Gold medal – first place	2026 Santo Domingo	Individual
Gold medal – first place	2026 Santo Domingo	Team
Gold medal – first place	2026 Santo Domingo	Mixed team
Summer Universiade
Bronze medal – third place	2017 Taipei	Individual
Bronze medal – third place	2017 Taipei	Mixed team

Alejandra Valencia Trujillo (born 17 October 1994) is a Mexican archer.

== Career ==
She won two gold medals the 2011 Pan American Games — women's team and women's individual. She won bronze at 2011 World Archery Youth Championships recurve cadet women's individual.

=== Olympic Games ===
Valencia competed both in London 2012 and in Rio 2016. In London, at the age of 17, she lost the 1/16 eliminations in the individual competition, while Mexico was eliminated in the quarter-finals of the women's team competition against Japan.

In the 2016 Summer Olympics at Rio de Janeiro, Valencia got all the way to the semi-finals, where she lost to German silver medalist Lisa Unruh. Valencia also lost the bronze medal match against gold medalist from London 2012 Ki Bo-Bae, which placed her in fourth place. In the team competition, Mexico once again was eliminated in the quarter-finals.

She has qualified to represent Mexico at the 2020 Summer Olympics, and has won the bronze medal together with Luis Álvarez in the first ever mixed archery event in the olympics.

Two months later, she won the silver medal in the women's team event at the 2021 World Archery Championships held in Yankton, United States.

== Personal life ==
Valencia's parents are Elizabeth Trujillo and Francisco Valencia. She is a fan of Japanese anime.
