= Nam Su-hyeon =

South Korean Archer

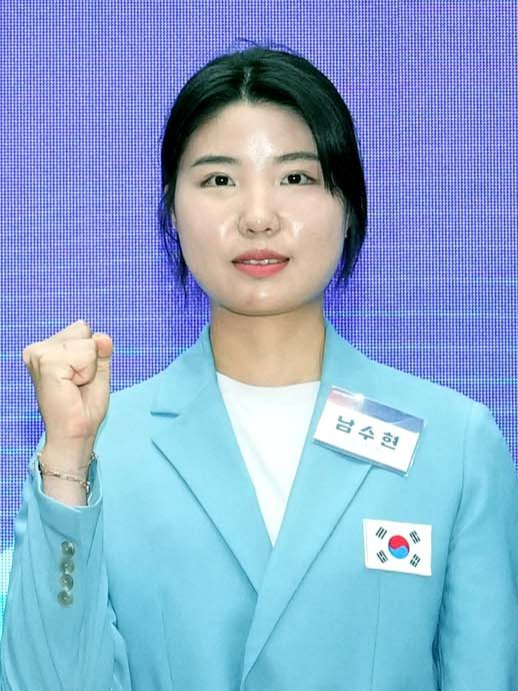
- Nam in 2024

Personal information
- Native name: 남수현
- Born: 27 January 2005 (age 21) Suncheon, South Korea
- Education: Suncheon Girls' High School

Sport
- Country: South Korea
- Sport: Archery
Medal record
Women's recurve archery
Representing South Korea
Olympic Games
Gold medal – first place	2024 Paris	Team
Silver medal – second place	2024 Paris	Individual
Asian Championships
Gold medal – first place	2025 Dhaka	Team
Silver medal – second place	2025 Dhaka	Individual
Archery World Cup
Silver medal – second place	2024	Team
Summer Universiade
Gold medal – first place	2025 Rhine-Ruhr	Individual
Bronze medal – third place	2025 Rhine-Ruhr	Mixed team

Nam Su-hyeon (Korean: 남수현; born 27 January 2005) is a South Korean archer. She won the silver medal at the 2024 Summer Olympics in the women's individual event. In the women's team event, she helped set an Olympic record – along with Lim Si-hyeon and Jeon Hun-young – and subsequently won the gold medal. She also placed second in the ranking round of the individual competition, behind Lim Si-hyeon, who set the world record.

== Biography ==
Nam, the second of three children, is from Suncheon. She started practicing archery at a young age and began training fully by her third year of elementary school. She attended Suncheon Seongnam Elementary School, where she won a national fifth grade title in 2016, Suncheon Pungdoek Middle School, and then Suncheon Girls' High School.

Nam won the 2020 National Championships and Hwaranggi National Competition. She was selected for the youth national team that year, but did not compete in any international events due to the COVID-19 pandemic. In 2023, she competed at the national championship and won a silver medal in the team event, also competing at the National Sports Festival where she won a silver in the individual and a silver in the team event. She graduated from Suncheon Girls' High School in 2024.

Nam placed third at the 2024 Korean Olympic trials, securing her a spot in the 2024 Summer Olympics, both in the individual event and the team event. She also competed at the 2024 Archery World Cup, helping her team to the gold medal, although she did not advance in the individual event. In the individual event at the Olympics, she placed second in the ranking round with 688 points, only behind Lim Si-hyeon, who set the Olympic record. At the team event, Nam, Lim, and Jeon Hun-young set an Olympic record with a total of 2,046 in the ranking round and later won the gold medal, the 10th consecutive time the South Korean team won the women's team event at the Olympics.
