= Yang Xiaolei =

Chinese archer (born 2000)

Personal information
- Nationality: Chinese
- Born: 28 June 2000 (age 26) Changzhou, Jiangsu, China

Sport
- Sport: Archery
Medal record
Women's recurve archery
Representing China
Olympic Games
Silver medal – second place	2024 Paris	Team

Yang Xiaolei (born 28 June 2000) is a Chinese archer. She competed in the women's individual event at the 2020 Summer Olympics.
