= Jeon Hun-young =

South Korean archer (born 1994)

Personal information
- Born: 29 May 1994 (age 32) Incheon, South Korea
- Education: Kyung Hee University

Sport
- Sport: Archery
Medal record
Women's recurve archery
Representing South Korea
Olympic Games
Gold medal – first place	2024 Paris	Team

Jeon Hun-young (Korean: 전훈영; born 29 May 1994) is a South Korean archer. She qualified for the 2024 Summer Olympics: in the women's team event, she, Lim Si-hyeon, and Nam Su-hyeon set the Olympic record in the ranking round and subsequently won the gold medal, defeating China in the final.

== Biography ==
Jeon was born in Incheon and grew up there. She attended Suncheon Elementary School, where she discovered archery. In 2024, she recalled that "At the time, there was an archery club at the school. While watching the archery team shooting arrows in the school playground, the coach called me and encouraged me to try archery, and that's how I've continued to pull the bowstring to this day." While attending Incheon Girls' Middle School in 2009, Jeon was selected to the youth national team and set a world record in the cadet category while competing at the World Youth Championships.

Jeon later attended Inli Girls' High School and then Kyung Hee University. She won silver at the national championships in 2013 and won gold in 2014. In 2014, she made the national team and participated at the World University Archery Championships, where she won gold in the mixed team event and bronze in the individual event. After she graduated from college, she competed domestically for a team representing Hyundai Department Store and later for a team representing Incheon. She qualified for the national team in 2020, but did not compete in any international events due to the COVID-19 pandemic. She later competed at the 2024 Korean Olympic trials and placed second, thus securing a spot in the individual and team events at the 2024 Summer Olympics. She also participated at the 2024 Archery World Cup, winning two silver medals. In the team event at the Olympics, Jeon helped set an Olympic record and later won a gold medal, the 10th consecutive time the South Korean team won the women's team event at the Olympics.
