= 2025 World Archery Championships – Men's team recurve =

Men's team recurve at the 2025 World Archery Championships
- Venue: Gwangju International Archery Center
- Location: Gwangju, South Korea
- Dates: 9–10 September
- Competitors: 123 from 41 nations

Medalists
gold medal	Kim Je-deok; Kim Woo-jin; Lee Woo-seok	South Korea
silver medal	Trenton Cowles; Brady Ellison; Christian Stoddard	United States
bronze medal	Tetsuya Aoshima; Yuki Kawata; Junya Nakanishi	Japan

The men's team recurve competition at the 2025 World Archery Championships took place from 9 to 10 September 2025 in Gwangju, South Korea.

== Schedule ==
All times are in Korea Standard Time (UTC+09:00).

Date	Time	Round
Monday, 8 September		Official practice
Tuesday, 9 September	09:00; 14:15; 14:45; 15:15; 15:45	Qualification round First Round; Second round Quarterfinals; Semifinals
Wednesday, 10 September	14:55; 15:21	Bronze-medal match Gold-medal match

== Qualification round ==
Results after 216 arrows. The top 24 teams qualified to Elimination round.

High green denotes at least one round bye.
Light green denotes entering from first round.

Rank	Nation	Name	Score
1	South Korea	Kim Je-deok; Kim Woo-jin; Lee Woo-seok	2062
2	China	Kao Wenchao; Li Zhongyuan; Wang Yan	2036
3	Italy	Matteo Borsani; Federico Musolesi; Mauro Nespoli	2035
4	Japan	Tetsuya Aoshima; Yuki Kawata; Junya Nakanishi	2034
5	Chinese Taipei	Cheng Hsiang-hui; Su Yu-yang; Tang Chih-chun	2014
6	United States	Trenton Cowles; Brady Ellison; Christian Stoddard	2008
7	Ukraine	Oleksii Hunbin; Vladyslav Lisniak; Artem Ovchynnikov	2003
8	France	Baptiste Addis; Thomas Chirault; Jean-Charles Valladont	2000
9	India	Dhiraj Bommadevara; Neeraj Chauhan; Rahul Rahul	1996
10	Brazil	Marcus D'Almeida; Matheus Gomes; Matheus Zwick Ely	1994
11	Indonesia	Ahmad Khoirul Baasith; Arif Dwi Pangestu; Riau Ega Agata Salsabilla	1993
12	Germany	Mathias Kramer; Jonathan Vetter; Moritz Wieser	1986
13	Canada	Aaron Cox; Brian Maxwell; Eric Peters	1984
14	Spain	Pablo Acha; Javier Mérida González; Andrés Temiño	1984
15	Mexico	Jesús Flores; Matías Grande; Carlos Rojas	1979
16	Turkey	Berkay Akkoyun; Mete Gazoz; Berkim Tümer	1975
17	Mongolia	Baatarkhuyagiin Otgonbold; Dorjsürengiin Dashnamjil; Jantsangiin Gantögs	1970
18	Kazakhstan	Ilfat Abdullin; Ivan Bercha; Dastan Karimov	1967
19	Colombia	Santiago Arcila; Jorge Enríquez; Andrés Hernández	1965
20	Great Britain	Conor Hall; Tom Hall; Patrick Huston	1963
21	Australia	Jai Crawley; Ryan Tyack; Marcus Yiu	1961
22	Bangladesh	Abdur Rahman Alif; Mia Md Rakib; Ram Krishna Saha	1958
23	Vietnam	Hoàng Văn Lộc; Lê Quốc Phong; Nguyễn Minh Đức	1955
24	Denmark	Christian Christensen; Rasmus Christensen; Anders Vind Dalsgaard	1954
25	Slovenia	Den Habjan Malavašič; Žiga Ravnikar; Oskar Zavasnik	1950
26	Belgium	Théo Carbonetti; Jarno De Smedt; Feel Stinkens	1944
27	Switzerland	Keziah Chabin; Florian Faber; Thomas Rufer	1939
28	Hong Kong	Chu Pak Ho; Kwok Yin Chai; Wong Sung Tin	1936
29	Netherlands	Willem Bakker; Senna Roos; Kay van Laarhoven	1936
30	Chile	Andrés Aguilar; Andrés Gallardo; Tomás Peña Leiva	1936
31	Israel	Roy Drorn; Niv Frenkel; Eyal Roziner	1928
32	Czech Republic	František Heřmánek; Richard Krejčí; Adam Li	1925
33	United Arab Emirates	Khalifa Alkaabi; Sib Sankar Maity; Ali Ranjabri	1924
34	Georgia	Anri Basiladze; Aleksandre Machavariani; Temur Makievi	1923
35	Uzbekistan	Shokhjakhon Abdulkhamidov; Bekzod Boborajabov; Amirkhon Sadikov	1922
36	Poland	Jakub Bąk; Oskar Kasprowski; Maksymilian Osuch	1912
37	Philippines	Jason Emmanuel Feliciano; Girvin Garcia; Renian Nawew	1889
38	Serbia	Mihajlo Stefanović; Jovan Uverić; Marko Vulić	1851
39	Saudi Arabia	Abdulrahman Al-Musa; Rashed Alsubaie; Mansour Alwi	1840
40	Latvia	Dilans Gods-Romanovskis; Gleb Kononovs; Romans Sergejevs	1779
41	Turkmenistan	Jorakuly Jumayev; Ezizmuhammet Sahedov; Vepa Sahedov	1710

== Elimination round ==
=== Top half ===
1/12 finals
17	Mongolia	2	56	54	56	54
16	Turkey	6	54	59	54	57
9	India	4	55	55	53	54	26
24	Denmark	5	53	53	55	58	28
21	Australia	1	52	55	49
12	Germany	5	57	55	59
13	Canada	4	56	52	54	57	28
20	Great Britain	5	52	53	56	54	28+

1/8 finals
1	South Korea	6	56	57	56	58
16	Turkey	2	58	56	55	56
24	Denmark	2	57	53	53	55
8	France	6	55	54	57	58
5	Chinese Taipei	2	57	54	57	57
12	Germany	6	56	56	58	58
13	Great Britain	2	55	56	53	58
4	Japan	6	56	54	59	59

Quarterfinals
1	South Korea	5	57	57	55	58	29
8	France	4	57	56	57	58	28
12	Germany	3	53	57	57	57
4	Japan	5	55	55	58	57

Semifinals
1	South Korea	5	57	55	54	57	30
4	Japan	4	55	58	58	54	28

=== Bottom half ===
1/12 finals
19	Colombia	3	54	52	54	58
14	Spain	5	52	55	58	58
11	Indonesia	6	58	52	55	59
22	Bangladesh	2	53	53	54	52
23	Vietnam	3	56	54	55	53
10	Brazil	5	56	58	54	54
15	Mexico	4	56	58	55	54	26
18	Kazakhstan	5	57	50	57	52	28

1/8 finals
3	Italy	2	51	57	54	57
14	Spain	6	57	56	55	58
11	Indonesia	2	54	54	57	57
6	United States	6	55	58	55	58
7	Ukraine	0	56	55	53
10	Brazil	6	57	57	58
18	Kazakhstan	2	56	51	48	52
2	China	6	53	57	56	55

Quarterfinals
14	Spain	4	56	51	58	54	28
6	United States	5	57	56	53	53	29
10	Brazil	5	56	56	58
2	China	1	56	53	56

Semifinals
6	United States	6	57	58	57
10	Brazil	0	55	55	55

== Final round ==
Semifinals
1	South Korea	5	57	55	55	57	30
4	Japan	4	56	58	58	54	28
6	United States	6	57	58	57
10	Brazil	0	55	55	55

Finals
1	South Korea	6	56	57	59
6	United States	0	55	55	56
Third place
4	Japan	6	55	57	59
10	Brazil	0	52	55	56
