= Archery at the 2025 Summer World University Games – Men's team recurve =

Men's team recurve at the 2025 Summer World University Games
- Venue: Sportpark am Hallo (qualification); Zollverein Coal Mine Industrial Complex (finals)
- Location: Essen, Germany
- Dates: 22 – 25 July 2025
- Competitors: 51 from 17 nations

Medalists
gold medal	Tetsuya Aoshima; Yuya Funahashi; Kosei Shirai	Japan
silver medal	Kim Seon-woo; Kim Ye-chan; Seo Min-gi	South Korea
bronze medal	Berkay Akkoyun; Berkim Tümer; Abdullah Yıldırmış	Turkey

The men's team recurve archery competition at the 2025 Summer World University Games was held at the Sportpark am Hallo and the Zollverein Coal Mine Industrial Complex in Essen, Germany from 22 to 25 July 2025.

== Records ==
Prior to the competition, the world and Universiade records were as follows.

- 216 arrows qualification round

Category	Team	Athlete	Score	Record	Date	Place	Event
World record	South Korea	Im Dong-hyun	699	2087	20 July 2012	London, United Kingdom	2012 Summer Olympics
World record	South Korea	Kim Bub-min	698	2087	20 July 2012	London, United Kingdom	2012 Summer Olympics
World record	South Korea	Oh Jin-hyek	690	2087	20 July 2012	London, United Kingdom	2012 Summer Olympics
Universiade record	South Korea (KOR)	Lee Seung-yun	693	2062	4 July 2015	Gwangju, South Korea	2015 Summer Universiade
Universiade record	South Korea (KOR)	Ku Bon-chan	686	2062	4 July 2015	Gwangju, South Korea	2015 Summer Universiade
Universiade record	South Korea (KOR)	Kim Woo-jin	683	2062	4 July 2015	Gwangju, South Korea	2015 Summer Universiade

== Qualification round ==
The ranking round took place on 22 July 2025 to determine the seeding for the elimination rounds. It consisted of three archers' results in individual event, with a maximum score of 2160.

Rank	Team	Archer	Individual			Team		
Rank	Team	Archer	Score	10s	Xs	Total	10s	Xs
1	South Korea	Seo Min-gi	683	39	23	2004	100	40
1	South Korea	Kim Seon-woo	669	34	7	2004	100	40
1	South Korea	Kim Ye-chan	652	27	10	2004	100	40
2	Japan	Yuya Funahashi	665	34	11	1971	85	26
2	Japan	Tetsuya Aoshima	662	32	9	1971	85	26
2	Japan	Kosei Shirai	644	19	6	1971	85	26
3	China	Feng Hao	658	27	6	1970	74	22
3	China	Wang Yan	658	27	12	1970	74	22
3	China	Qin Wangyu	654	20	4	1970	74	22
4	Chinese Taipei	Tang Chih-chun	667	31	15	1961	74	32
4	Chinese Taipei	Su Yu-yang	653	25	8	1961	74	32
4	Chinese Taipei	Kuo Yu-cheng	641	18	9	1961	74	32
5	United States	Trenton Cowles	665	32	10	1950	75	18
5	United States	Alex Gilliam	652	24	4	1950	75	18
5	United States	Venugopal Kunnavakkam	633	19	4	1950	75	18
6	Turkey	Berkim Tümer	652	23	12	1947	64	26
6	Turkey	Berkay Akkoyun	651	18	6	1947	64	26
6	Turkey	Abdullah Yıldırmış	644	23	8	1947	64	26
7	Germany	Moritz Wieser	654	24	5	1930	64	24
7	Germany	Jonathan Vetter	647	23	13	1930	64	24
7	Germany	Phil Lüttmerding	629	17	6	1930	64	24
8	Israel	Roy Dror	665	32	10	1926	74	22
8	Israel	Niv Frenkel	638	23	7	1926	74	22
8	Israel	Eyal Roziner	623	19	5	1926	74	22
9	France	Jules Pedoux	656	26	5	1918	72	15
9	France	Nicolas Bernardi	652	23	5	1918	72	15
9	France	Romain Viale	610	23	5	1918	72	15
10	Italy	Matteo Borsani	657	32	16	1906	61	24
10	Italy	Francesco Gregori	636	13	3	1906	61	24
10	Italy	Alessio Mangerini	613	16	5	1906	61	24
11	Poland	Maksymilian Osuch	644	16	0	1892	52	7
11	Poland	Jakub Bąk	627	17	3	1892	52	7
11	Poland	Konrad Kupczak	621	19	4	1892	52	7
12	India	Aryan Rana	640	19	7	1889	50	18
12	India	Vishnu Choudhary	627	17	4	1889	50	18
12	India	Mrinal Chauhan	622	14	7	1889	50	18
13	Belgium	Jarno De Smedt	652	25	8	1887	61	20
13	Belgium	Theo Carbonetti	637	21	8	1887	61	20
13	Belgium	Arne Collas	598	15	4	1887	61	20
14	Switzerland	Keziah Chabin	641	23	7	1886	53	14
14	Switzerland	Félix Möckli	627	15	3	1886	53	14
14	Switzerland	Arnaud Renaud	618	15	4	1886	53	14
15	Malaysia	Akid Ezaidin	631	22	8	1866	53	17
15	Malaysia	Firdaus Rusmadi	621	16	4	1866	53	17
15	Malaysia	Haziq Khalil	614	15	5	1866	53	17
16	Mongolia	Enkhbayar Munkh-Erdene	636	18	4	1813	46	11
16	Mongolia	Tsenguun Tsogtbayar	616	15	4	1813	46	11
16	Mongolia	Bat-Amar Altanpurev	561	13	3	1813	46	11
17	Moldova	Andrei Belici	604	13	5	1714	34	13
17	Moldova	Mihai Sadoveanu	565	12	4	1714	34	13
17	Moldova	Evgheni Savciuc	545	9	4	1714	34	13

== Elimination round ==
The results are as below.

Round of 32
17	Moldova	2	45	43	50	45
16	Mongolia	6	48	50	48	48

Round of 16
1	South Korea	6	55	56	59
16	Mongolia	0	53	53	54
9	France	5	54	52	56
8	Israel	1	54	51	55
5	United States	3	51	55	57	55
12	India	5	54	57	55	55
13	Belgium	0	51	53	48
4	Chinese Taipei	6	58	58	54
3	China	6	55	56	56
14	Switzerland	0	52	55	51
11	Poland	0	54	54	54
6	Turkey	6	55	56	57
7	Germany	3	55	49	54	56
10	Italy	5	54	55	55	56
15	Malaysia	0	52	53	50
2	Japan	6	53	57	54

Quarter-finals
1	South Korea	6	56	59	55	57
9	France	2	55	53	56	54
12	India	3	56	59	55	54
4	Chinese Taipei	5	57	57	55	55
3	China	4	56	59	58	55	T.26
6	Turkey	5	57	55	54	57	T.28
10	Italy	4	54	52	53	54	T.26
2	Japan	5	47	55	55	52	T.27

Semi-finals
1	South Korea	6	58	58	56
4	Chinese Taipei	0	56	55	51
6	Turkey	1	53	54	55
2	Japan	5	59	54	56

Gold medal match
1	South Korea	4	51	58	55	57	T.27
2	Japan	5	51	58	55	57	T.27+
Bronze medal match
4	Chinese Taipei	0	51	54	53
6	Turkey	6	53	55	57
