= 2026 Archery World Cup =

- Sport: Archery
- Duration: 7 April – 13 September
- Recurve Men: (gold) (India) Dhiraj Bommadevara; (silver) (Japan) Junya Nakanishi; (bronze) (Turkey) Mete Gazoz
- Recurve Women: (gold) (Czech Republic) Marie Horáčková; (silver) (Germany) Katharina Bauer; (bronze) (Turkey) Elif Berra Gökkır
- Compound Men: (gold) (Austria) Nico Wiener; (silver) (Denmark) Mathias Fullerton; (bronze) (Mexico) Rodrigo González
- Compound Women: (gold) (United States) Alexis Ruiz; (silver) (Mexico) Dafne Quintero; (bronze) (Colombia) Sara López

Seasons
- ← 2025 2027 →

The 2026 Archery World Cup, also known as the Hyundai Archery World Cup for sponsorship reasons, was the 20th edition of the international archery circuit organised annually by World Archery. The 2026 World Cup consisted of five events, and ran from 7 April to 13 September. The first four stages were open to archers who had recorded a score that exceeded a minimum competition standard. For the final stage, only 8 archers were invited per category. Stage winners automatically qualified for the final, as well as one archer from the host nation. The remaining spots were filled based on the Hyundai Archery World Cup Ranking points.

== Calendar ==
The calendar for the 2026 World Cup, announced by World Archery.

Stage	Date	Location	Ref.
1	7–12 April	Puebla, Mexico	
2	5–10 May	Shanghai, China	
3	9–14 June	(Turkey) Antalya, Türkiye	
4	7–12 July	Madrid, Spain	
Final	12–13 September	Saltillo, Mexico	

== Results ==
=== Recurve ===
==== Men's individual ====
Stage	Venue	1st place, gold medalist(s)	2nd place, silver medalist(s)	3rd place, bronze medalist(s)
1	(Mexico) Puebla	Brady Ellison (USA)	Tang Chih-chun (TPE)	Mete Gazoz (TUR)
2	(China) Shanghai	Li Mengqi (CHN)	Mete Gazoz (TUR)	Berkim Tümer (TUR)
3	(Turkey) Antalya	Dhiraj Bommadevara (IND)	Lee Woo-seok (KOR)	Li Mengqi (CHN)
4	(Spain) Madrid	Mete Gazoz (TUR)	Mauro Nespoli (ITA)	Kim Je-deok (KOR)
Final	(Mexico) Saltillo	Dhiraj Bommadevara (IND)	Junya Nakanishi (JPN)	Mete Gazoz (TUR)

==== Women's individual ====
Stage	Venue	1st place, gold medalist(s)	2nd place, silver medalist(s)	3rd place, bronze medalist(s)
1	(Mexico) Puebla	Zhu Jingyi (CHN)	Yu Qi (CHN)	Huang Yuwei (CHN)
2	(China) Shanghai	Kang Chae-young (KOR)	Zhu Jingyi (CHN)	Jang Min-hee (KOR)
3	(Turkey) Antalya	Zhu Jingyi (CHN)	Ana Paula Vázquez (MEX)	Roberta Di Francesco (ITA)
4	(Spain) Madrid	Marie Horáčková (CZE)	Elif Berra Gökkır (TUR)	Oh Ye-jin (KOR)
Final	(Mexico) Saltillo	Marie Horáčková (CZE)	Katharina Bauer (GER)	Elif Berra Gökkır (TUR)

==== Men's team ====
Stage	Venue	1st place, gold medalist(s)	2nd place, silver medalist(s)	3rd place, bronze medalist(s)
1	(Mexico) Puebla	United States; Brady Ellison; Christian Stoddard; Jack Williams	Turkey; Berkay Akkoyun; Mete Gazoz; Berkim Tümer	China; Qin Wangyu; Sun Jingxuan; Wang Yan
2	(China) Shanghai	South Korea; Kim Je-deok; Kim Woo-jin; Lee Woo-seok	Turkey; Berkay Akkoyun; Mete Gazoz; Berkim Tümer	Vietnam; Lê Quốc Phong; Nguyễn Duy; Nguyễn Hoàng Phi Vũ
3	(Turkey) Antalya	South Korea; Kim Je-deok; Kim Woo-jin; Lee Woo-seok	United States; Trenton Cowles; Christian Stoddard; Nicholas D'Amour	Chinese Taipei; Tang Chih-chun; Lin Zih-siang; Cheng Hsiang-hui
4	(Spain) Madrid	South Korea; Kim Je-deok; Kim Woo-jin; Lee Woo-seok	France; Jean-Charles Valladont; Thomas Chirault; Baptiste Addis	Italy; Mauro Nespoli; Mateo Borsani; Francesco Gregori

==== Women's team ====
Stage	Venue	1st place, gold medalist(s)	2nd place, silver medalist(s)	3rd place, bronze medalist(s)
1	(Mexico) Puebla	China; Huang Yuwei; Yu Qi; Zhu Jingyi	Turkey; Elif Berra Gökkır; Gizem Özkan; Dünya Yenihayat	Mexico; Ángela Ruiz; Alejandra Valencia; Ana Paula Vázquez
2	(China) Shanghai	India; Ankita Bhakat; Deepika Kumari; Kumkum Mohod	China; Huang Yuwei; Yu Qi; Zhu Jingyi	South Korea; Kang Chae-young; Lee Yun-ji; Oh Ye-jin
3	(Turkey) Antalya	China; Huang Yuwei; Li Jiaman; Zhu Jingyi	Mexico; Ángela Ruiz; Alejandra Valencia; Ana Paula Vázquez	South Korea; Kang Chae-young; Lee Yun-ji; Oh Ye-jin
4	(Spain) Madrid	South Korea; Kang Chae-young; Lee Yun-ji; Oh Ye-jin	United States; Catalina GNoriega; Casey Kaufhold; Jennifer Mucino-Fernandez	Japan; Waka Sonoda; Fuko Ohta; Nanami Asakuno

==== Mixed team ====
Stage	Venue	1st place, gold medalist(s)	2nd place, silver medalist(s)	3rd place, bronze medalist(s)
1	(Mexico) Puebla	China; Zhu Jingyi; Sun Jingxuan	United States; Casey Kaufhold; Brady Ellison	Turkey; Elif Berra Gökkır; Mete Gazoz
2	(China) Shanghai	China; Huang Yuwei; Li Mengqi	South Korea; Oh Ye-jin; Kim Woo-jin	Germany; Michelle Kroppen; Leon Zemella
3	(Turkey) Antalya	India; Kumkum Mohod; Dhiraj Bommadevara	South Korea; Oh Ye-jin; Kim Je-deok	Italy; Roberta Di Francesco; Matteo Borsani
4	(Spain) Madrid	Spain; Elia Canales; Andrés Temiño	China; Zhu Jingyi; Li Mengqi	Italy; Roberta Di Francesco; Mauro Nespoli

=== Compound ===
==== Men's individual ====
Stage	Venue	1st place, gold medalist(s)	2nd place, silver medalist(s)	3rd place, bronze medalist(s)
1	(Mexico) Puebla	Mathias Fullerton (DEN)	Nico Wiener (AUT)	Tim Jevšnik (SLO)
2	(China) Shanghai	Sebastián García (MEX)	Nicolas Girard (FRA)	Sahil Jadhav (IND)
3	(Turkey) Antalya	Mike Schloesser (NED)	Sebastián García (MEX)	Mathias Fullerton (DEN)
4	(Spain) Madrid	Pablo Gómez (COL)	Mike Schloesser (NED)	Simon Moritz (GER)
Final	(Mexico) Saltillo	Nico Wiener (AUT)	Mathias Fullerton (DEN)	Rodrigo González (MEX)

==== Women's individual ====
Stage	Venue	1st place, gold medalist(s)	2nd place, silver medalist(s)	3rd place, bronze medalist(s)
1	(Mexico) Puebla	Sara López (COL)	Lisell Jäätma (EST)	Alejandra Usquiano (COL)
2	(China) Shanghai	Lisell Jäätma (EST)	Andrea Becerra (MEX)	Alexis Ruiz (USA)
3	(Turkey) Antalya	Andrea Becerra (MEX)	Sara López (COL)	Arina Cherkezova (AIN)
4	(Spain) Madrid	Ella Gibson (GBR)	Fatin Nurfatehah Mat Salleh (MAS)	Prithika Pradeep (IND)
Final	(Mexico) Saltillo	(United States) Alexis Ruiz	(Mexico) Dafne Quintero	(Colombia) Sara López

==== Men's team ====
Stage	Venue	1st place, gold medalist(s)	2nd place, silver medalist(s)	3rd place, bronze medalist(s)
1	(Mexico) Puebla	Colombia; Sebastián Arenas; Pablo Gómez; Jagdeep Singh	Turkey; Batuhan Akçaoğlu; Emircan Haney; Eren Kırca	Mexico; Sebastián García; Máximo Méndez; Juan del Río
2	(China) Shanghai	Turkey; Batuhan Akçaoğlu; Emircan Haney; Yağız Sezgin	United States; Gaius Carter; James Lutz; Louis Price	China; Liu Jinyi; Qi Xiangshuo; Shi Jingyu
3	(Turkey) Antalya	China; Liu Jinyi; Liao Jiahao; Shi Jingyu	Denmark; Rasmus Bransen; Martin Damsbo; Mathias Fullerton	Mexico; Sebastián García; Máximo Méndez; Rodrigo González
4	(Spain) Madrid	Denmark; Rasmus Bransen; Martin Damsbo; Mathias Fullerton	Mexico; Miguel Becerra; Elias Reyes Cravioto; Rodrigo González	Germany; Simon Moritz; Noah Nuber; Paolo Kunsch

==== Women's team ====
Stage	Venue	1st place, gold medalist(s)	2nd place, silver medalist(s)	3rd place, bronze medalist(s)
1	(Mexico) Puebla	India; Madhura Dhamangaonkar; Pragati; Jyothi Surekha Vennam	United States; Olivia Dean; Paige Pearce; Alexis Ruiz	Mexico; Andrea Becerra; Ana Sofía Hernández; Dafne Quintero
2	(China) Shanghai	Turkey; Hazal Burun; Defne Çakmak; Emine Rabia Oğuz	United States; Olivia Dean; Paige Pearce; Alexis Ruiz	Mexico; Andrea Becerra; Ana Sofía Hernández; Dafne Quintero
3	(Turkey) Antalya	Turkey; Hazal Burun; Defne Çakmak; Emine Rabia Oğuz	Mexico; Andrea Becerra; Adriana Castillo; Dafne Quintero	Germany; Katharina Raab; Marie Marquardt; Jennifer Walter
4	(Spain) Madrid	Colombia; Sara López; Alejandra Usquiano; Mariana Rodríguez	India; Prithika Pradeep; Jyothi Surekha; Chikitha Taniparthi	South Korea; Park Ye-rin; Park Jung-yoon; Kang Yeon-seo

==== Mixed team ====
Stage	Venue	1st place, gold medalist(s)	2nd place, silver medalist(s)	3rd place, bronze medalist(s)
1	(Mexico) Puebla	Denmark; Tanja Gellenthien; Mathias Fullerton	Netherlands; Sanne de Laat; Mike Schloesser	United States; Alexis Ruiz; Stephan Hansen
2	(China) Shanghai	United States; Alexis Ruiz; James Lutz	Turkey; Hazal Burun; Emircan Haney	Estonia; Lisell Jäätma; Robin Jäätma
3	(Turkey) Antalya	Chinese Taipei; Huang I-jou; Chang Cheng-wei	Denmark; Tanja Gellenthien; Mathias Fullerton	Mexico; Andrea Becerra; Sebastián García
4	(Spain) Madrid	United Kingdom; Ella Gibson; Ajay Scott	Mexico; Ximena Estrada; Miguel Becerra	Denmark; Tanja Gellenthien; Mathias Fullerton

== Medals table ==
Rank	Nation	Gold	Silver	Bronze	Total
1	China	8	4	5	17
2	South Korea	5	4	6	15
3	India	5	1	2	8
4	Turkey	4	7	5	16
5	United States	4	6	2	12
6	Colombia	4	1	2	7
7	Denmark	3	3	2	8
8	Mexico	2	8	7	17
9	Czech Republic	2	0	0	2
9	Great Britain	2	0	0	2
11	Netherlands	1	2	0	3
12	Chinese Taipei	1	1	1	3
12	Estonia	1	1	1	3
14	Austria	1	1	0	2
15	Spain	1	0	0	1
16	France	0	2	0	2
17	Germany	0	1	4	5
18	Japan	0	1	1	2
19	Malaysia	0	1	0	1
20	Italy	0	0	3	3
21	Individual Neutral Athletes	0	0	1	1
21	Slovenia	0	0	1	1
21	Vietnam	0	0	1	1
Totals (23 entries)		44	44	44	132
