= Turkey at the 2024 Summer Olympics =

- IOC code: TUR
- NOC: Turkish Olympic Committee
- Website: olimpiyat.org.tr (in English and Turkish)

in Paris, France 26 July 2024 – 11 August 2024
- Competitors: 101 (47 men and 54 women) in 18 sports
- Flag bearers: Mete Gazoz & Busenaz Sürmeneli
- Medals Ranked 64th: Gold 0 Silver 3 Bronze 5 Total 8

Summer Olympics appearances (overview)
- 1908; 1912; 1920; 1924; 1928; 1932; 1936; 1948; 1952; 1956; 1960; 1964; 1968; 1972; 1976; 1980; 1984; 1988; 1992; 1996; 2000; 2004; 2008; 2012; 2016; 2020; 2024; 2028

Other related appearances
- 1906 Intercalated Games

Turkey, officially named Türkiye by the IOC, competed at the 2024 Summer Olympics in Paris from 26 July to 11 August 2024. Since the nation's official debut in 1908, Turkish athletes have appeared in every edition of the Summer Olympic Games, except for three occasions: Antwerp 1920, because of sanction against the Central Powers including the Ottoman Empire, Los Angeles 1932 during the period of the Great Depression, and Moscow 1980, as part of the United States-led boycott. Notably, the 2024 Summer Olympics marked the first time since 1984 that Turkey did not secure at least one gold medal.

Silver medalist shooter Yusuf Dikeç became an internet phenomenon, gaining widespread fame for his apparent nonchalance and being more casually dressed compared to other athletes.

== Medalists ==
Medal	Name	Sport	Event	Date
Silver	Yusuf Dikeç; Şevval İlayda Tarhan	Shooting	Mixed 10 m air pistol team	30 July
Silver	Hatice Akbaş	Boxing	Women's 54 kg	8 August
Silver	Buse Naz Çakıroğlu	Boxing	Women's 50 kg	9 August
Bronze	Mete Gazoz; Berkim Tümer; Abdullah Yıldırmış	Archery	Men's team	29 July
Bronze	Buse Tosun Çavuşoğlu	Wrestling	Women's 68 kg	6 August
Bronze	Esra Yıldız	Boxing	Women's 57 kg	7 August
Bronze	Taha Akgül	Wrestling	Men's freestyle 125 kg	10 August
Bronze	Nafia Kuş	Taekwondo	Women's +67kg	10 August

Medals by sport
Sport	1st place, gold medalist(s)	2nd place, silver medalist(s)	3rd place, bronze medalist(s)	Total
Boxing	0	2	1	3
Shooting	0	1	0	1
Wrestling	0	0	2	2
Archery	0	0	1	1
Taekwondo	0	0	1	1
Total	0	3	5	8

== Competitors ==
The following is the list of number of competitors in the Games.

Sport	Men	Women	Total
Archery	3	1	4
Athletics	10	6	16
Badminton	0	1	1
Boxing	2	5	7
Cycling	1	0	1
Fencing	1	1	2
Gymnastics	5	0	5
Judo	5	3	8
Modern pentathlon	1	1	2
Rowing	0	1	1
Sailing	3	5	8
Shooting	3	4	7
Swimming	4	4	8
Table tennis	0	1	1
Taekwondo	2	3	5
Volleyball	0	13	13
Weightlifting	1	0	1
Wrestling	6	5	11
Total	47	54	101

== Archery ==
Turkey fielded a full squad of men's team recurve and one women's in individual recurve, by virtue of their silver-medal victory (for men's team recurve), which obtaining one of three available spots as the highest-ranked eligible nation at the 2023 World Championships in Berlin, Germany; meanwhile the nations grab one women's quota through the 2024 European Continental Qualification Tournament in Essen, Germany.

Athlete	Event	Ranking round		Round of 64	Round of 32	Round of 16	Quarterfinals	Semifinals	Final / BM	
Athlete	Event	Score	Seed	Opposition Score	Opposition Score	Opposition Score	Opposition Score	Opposition Score	Opposition Score	Rank
Mete Gazoz	Men's individual	676	8	Gallardo (CHI); W 6–0	Tang (TPE); W 6–2	Chirault (FRA); W 6–5	Kim W-j (KOR); L 4–6	Did not advance		7
Ulaş Tümer	Men's individual	676	10	Rojas (MEX); W 6–4	Wijler (NED); W 6–2	Ellison (USA); L 2–6	Did not advance			9
Abdullah Yıldırmış	Men's individual	640	58	Ellison (USA); L 2–6	Did not advance					33
Mete Gazoz; Ulaş Tümer; Abdullah Yıldırmış	Men's team	1992	6	—N/a		Colombia; W 5–4	India; W 6–2	France; L 4–5	China; W 6–2	3rd place, bronze medalist(s)
Elif Berra Gökkır	Women's individual	671	5	Fazil (MAS); W 6–0	Fallah (IRI); W 6–0	Noda (JPN); W 6–4	Jeon H-y (KOR); L 2–6	Did not advance		8
Mete Gazoz; Elif Berra Gökkır	Mixed team	1347	6 Q	—N/a		Japan; L 4–5	Did not advance			9

== Athletics ==
Turkish track and field athletes achieved the entry standards for Paris 2024, either by passing the direct qualifying mark (or time for track and road races) or by world ranking, in the following events (a maximum of 3 athletes each):

Key

- Note–Ranks given for track events are within the athlete's heat only
- Q = Qualified for the next round
- q = Qualified for the next round as a fastest loser or, in field events, by position without achieving the qualifying target
- NR = National record
- N/A = Round not applicable for the event
- Bye = Athlete not required to compete in round

Track and road events
Men

Athlete	Event	Heat		Repechage		Semifinal		Final	
Athlete	Event	Result	Rank	Result	Rank	Result	Rank	Result	Rank
Kayhan Özer	100 m	10.34	50	—N/a		Did not advance			
Berke Akçam	400 m hurdles	49.48	26	48.72	4 Q	49.12	17	Did not advance	
Yasmani Copello	400 m hurdles	50.72	36	DNS		Did not advance			
Kaan Kigen Özbilen	Marathon	—N/a						DNF	
Salih Korkmaz	20 km walk	—N/a						1:29:05	45

Women

Athlete	Event	Heat		Repechage		Semifinal		Final	
Athlete	Event	Result	Rank	Result	Rank	Result	Rank	Result	Rank
Meryem Bekmez	20 km walk	—N/a						1:38:06	40

Mixed

Athlete	Event	Final	
Athlete	Event	Result	Rank
Ayşe Tekdal; Mazlum Demir	Marathon walk relay	3:14:53	23

Field events

Athlete	Event	Qualification		Final	
Athlete	Event	Distance	Position	Distance	Position
Alperen Acet	Men's high jump	2.20	22	Did not advance	
Ersu Şaşma	Men's pole vault	5.75	=1q	5.85	5
Necati Er	Men's triple jump	13.65	32	Did not advance	
Özkan Baltacı	Men's hammer throw	71.40	27	Did not advance	
Buse Savaşkan	Women's high jump	1.92	=8 q	1.86	10
Eda Tuğsuz	Women's javelin throw	55.30	31	Did not advance	
Tuğba Danışmaz	Women's triple jump	13.97	16	Did not advance	
Emel Dereli	Women's shot put	17.02	24	Did not advance	

== Badminton ==
Turkey entered one badminton player into the Olympic tournament based on the BWF Race to Paris Rankings.

Athlete	Event	Group stage			Elimination	Quarter-final	Semi-final	Final / BM	
Athlete	Event	Opposition Score	Opposition Score	Rank	Opposition Score	Opposition Score	Opposition Score	Opposition Score	Rank
Neslihan Arın	Women's singles	Ohori (JPN); L 0–2 (9–21, 7–21)	Castillo (PER); W 2–0 (21–16, 21–17)	2	Did not advance				14

== Boxing ==
Turkey entered eight boxers (three men and five women) into the Olympic tournament. Tokyo 2020 silver medalist Buse Naz Çakıroğlu (women's flyweight) and defending champion Busenaz Sürmeneli (women's welterweight), along with four rookies (Gümüş, Erdemir, Akbaş, and Özer), secured the spots on the Turkish squad in their respective weight divisions, either by advancing to the semifinal match or finishing in the top two, at the 2023 European Games in Nowy Targ, Poland. Later on, Kaan Aykutsun (men's middleweight) qualified himself to Paris 2024, by winning the quota bouts round, at the 2024 World Olympic Qualification Tournament 1 in Busto Arsizio, Italy. Esra Yıldız (women's featherweight) secured her spot following the triumph in quota bouts round at the 2024 World Olympic Qualification Tournament 2 in Bangkok, Thailand. Tuğrulhan Erdemir remove from Boxing at the 2024 Summer Olympics – Men's 71 kg.

Men

Athlete	Event	Round of 32	Round of 16	Quarterfinals	Semifinals	Final	
Athlete	Event	Opposition Result	Opposition Result	Opposition Result	Opposition Result	Opposition Result	Rank
Samet Gümüş	Men's 51 kg	Bye	Bibossinov (KAZ); L 0–5	Did not advance			9
Kaan Aykutsun	Men's 80 kg	Cavallaro (ITA); W 4–1	López (CUB); L 0–5	Did not advance			9

Women

Athlete	Event	Round of 32	Round of 16	Quarterfinals	Semifinals	Final	
Athlete	Event	Opposition Result	Opposition Result	Opposition Result	Opposition Result	Opposition Result	Rank
Buse Naz Çakıroğlu	Women's 50 kg	Bye	Herrera (MEX); W 5–0	Kaivo-oja (FIN); W 5–0	Villegas (PHI); W 5–0	Yu (CHN); L 1-4	2nd place, silver medalist(s)
Hatice Akbaş	Women's 54 kg	Davison (GBR); W 3–2	Echegaray (AUS); W 5–0	Enkhjargal (MGL); W 5–0	Ae-ji (KOR); W 3–2	Yuan (CHN); L 0–5	2nd place, silver medalist(s)
Esra Yıldız	Women's 57 kg	Camara (MLI); W 5–0	Hlimi (TUN); W 5–0	Romeu (BRA); W 4–1	Lin Yu-ting (TPE); L 0–5	Did not advance	3rd place, bronze medalist(s)
Gizem Özer	Women's 60 kg	Mesiano (ITA); L 1–4	Did not advance				17
Busenaz Sürmeneli	Women's 66 kg	Bye	Rygielska (POL); W 4–1	Suwannapheng (THA); L 1–4	Did not advance		5

== Cycling ==
=== Road ===
Turkey entered one male rider to compete in the men's road race events at the Olympics after securing those quotas through the UCI Nation Ranking.

Athlete	Event	Time	Rank
Burak Abay	Men's road race	DNF	

== Fencing ==
For the first time since 2016, Turkey entered two fencers into the Olympic competition. Enver Yıldırım qualified for the games by winning the gold medal in the men's individual sabre event at the 2024 Europe Zonal Qualifying Tournament in Differdange, Luxembourg. Later on, Nisanur Erbil got her quotas through the re-allocation of unused quota places.

Athlete	Event	Round of 64	Round of 32	Round of 16	Quarterfinal	Semifinal	Final / BM	
Athlete	Event	Opposition Score	Opposition Score	Opposition Score	Opposition Score	Opposition Score	Opposition Score	Rank
Enver Yıldırım	Men's sabre	Bye	Curatoli (ITA); L 10–15	Did not advance				26
Nisanur Erbil	Women's sabre	Bye	Skarbonkiewicz (USA); W 15–11	Sara Balzer (FRA); L 5–15	Did not advance			14

== Gymnastics ==
=== Artistic ===
Turkey fielded a squad of five male gymnasts for Paris after being one of the top nine teams not yet qualified at the 2023 World Championships in Antwerp, Belgium. This was the first time that Turkey fielded a full team in Gymnastics at the Summer Olympics.

==== Team (Men) ====
Athlete	Event	Qualification								Final							
Athlete	Event	Apparatus						Total	Rank	Apparatus						Total	Rank
Athlete	Event	F	PH	R	V	PB	HB	Total	Rank	F	PH	R	V	PB	HB	Total	Rank
Adem Asil	Team	13.833	~~DNS~~	14.866 Q	14.483	—N/a	13.533	—N/a		—N/a							
Ahmet Önder	Team	13.733	12.766	13.066	14.300	13.833	~~11.800~~	79.498	34	—N/a							
Ferhat Arıcan	Team	—N/a	13.800	—N/a	~~DNS~~	15.033 Q	—N/a	—N/a		—N/a							
İbrahim Çolak	Team	~~DNS~~	—N/a	14.533	—N/a	~~13.500~~	12.660	—N/a		—N/a							
Emre Dodanlı	Team	12.800	11.766	~~12.866~~	14.466	13.966	13.733	79.597	31 R3	—N/a							
Total	Team	40.366	38.332	42.465	44.032	42.832	39.532	247.559	9	Did not advance							

Individual finals

Athlete	Event	Qualification								Final							
Athlete	Event	Apparatus						Total	Rank	Apparatus						Total	Rank
Athlete	Event	F	PH	R	V	PB	HB	Total	Rank	F	PH	R	V	PB	HB	Total	Rank
Adem Asil	Rings	—N/a		14.866	—N/a			14.866	5 Q	—N/a		14.966	—N/a			14.966	5
Ferhat Arıcan	Parallel bars	—N/a				15.033	—N/a	15.033	7 Q	—N/a				15.100	—N/a	15.100	5

== Judo ==
Men

Athlete	Event	Round of 32	Round of 16	Quarterfinals	Semifinals	Repechage	Final / BM	
Athlete	Event	Opposition Result	Opposition Result	Opposition Result	Opposition Result	Opposition Result	Opposition Result	Rank
Salih Yıldız	60 kg	Bye	McKenzie (JAM); W 01–00	Sardalashvili (GEO); W 01–00	Mkheidze (FRA); L 00–01	—N/a	Nagayama (JPN); L 00–10	5
Muhammed Demirel	66 kg	Saha (FIN); L 00–01	Did not advance					17
Vedat Albayrak	81 kg	Gerbekov (BHR); W 10–00	Nagase (JPN); L 00–01	Did not advance				9
Mihael Žgank	90 kg	Hajiyev (AZE); L 00–01	Did not advance					17
İbrahim Tataroğlu	+100 kg	Marinič (SLO); W 11–00	Kim Min-jong (KOR); L 00–11	Did not advance				9

Women

Athlete	Event	Round of 32	Round of 16	Quarterfinals	Semifinals	Repechage	Final / BM	
Athlete	Event	Opposition Result	Opposition Result	Opposition Result	Opposition Result	Opposition Result	Opposition Result	Rank
Tuğçe Beder	48 kg	Boukli (FRA); L 00–10	Did not advance					17
Fidan Ögel	70 kg	Goshen (ISR); L 00–10	Did not advance					17
Kayra Özdemir	+78 kg	Bye	Adiyaasüren (MGL); W 10–00	Sone (JPN); W 01–00	Hershko (ISR); L 00–10	—N/a	Kim Ha-yun (KOR); L 00–10	5

Mixed

Athlete	Event	Round of 16	Quarterfinals	Semifinals	Repechage	Final / BM	
Athlete	Event	Opposition Result	Opposition Result	Opposition Result	Opposition Result	Opposition Result	Rank
Tuğçe Beder; Muhammed Demirel; Fidan Ögel; Mihael Žgank; Kayra Özdemir; İbrahim Tataroğlu	Team	South Korea; L 1–4	Did not advance				9

== Modern pentathlon ==
Turkish modern pentathletes confirmed two quota places for the Olympic games. Buğra Ünal and İlke Özyüksel secured their spots in their respective event through the release of the final Olympic ranking.

Athlete	Event		Fencing (épée one touch)				Riding (show jumping)			Swimming (200 m freestyle)			Combined: shooting/running (10 m laser pistol)/(3000 m)			Total points	Final rank
Athlete	Event		RR	BR	Rank	MP points	Penalties	Rank	MP points	Time	Rank	MP points	Time	Rank	MP points	Total points	Final rank
Buğra Ünal	Men's	Semifinal	20–15	0	5	225	17	14	283	2:07.24	13	296	10:23.26	12	677	1481	13
Buğra Ünal	Men's	Final	20–15	Did not advance													
İlke Özyüksel	Women's	Semifinal	16–19	4	9	209	0	6	300	2:16.50	7	277	11:34.68	5	606	1392	7 Q
İlke Özyüksel	Women's	Final	16–19	0	15	205	7	12	293	2:15.48	6	280	10:58.20	3	642	1420	6

== Rowing ==
Turkey entered one rower to compete at Paris 2024.

Athlete	Event	Heats		Repechage		Quarterfinals		Semifinals		Final	
Athlete	Event	Time	Rank	Time	Rank	Time	Rank	Time	Rank	Time	Rank
Elis Özbay	Women's single sculls	7:57.06	4 R	8:00.00	2 QF	7:56.51	6 SC/D	8:02.57	4 FD	7:46.95	22

Qualification Legend: FA=Final A (medal); FB=Final B (non-medal); FC=Final C (non-medal); FD=Final D (non-medal); FE=Final E (non-medal); FF=Final F (non-medal); SA/B=Semifinals A/B; SC/D=Semifinals C/D; SE/F=Semifinals E/F; QF=Quarterfinals; R=Repechage

== Sailing ==
Turkish sailors qualified one boat in each of the following classes through the 2024 ILCA 6 World Championships in Mar del Plata, Argentina; 2024 ILCA 7 World Championships in Adelaide, Australia; and 2024 Semaine Olympique Française (Last Chance Regatta) in Hyères, France.

Elimination events

Athlete	Event	Race																									Net points	Final rank
Athlete	Event	1	2	3	4	5	6	7	8	9	10	11	12	13	14	15	16	QF	SF1	SF2	SF3	SF4	SF5	SF6	F1	F2	Net points	Final rank
Merve Vatan	Women's IQFoil	20	23	5	3	14	20	25	12	13	10	19	14	25	12	—N/a											165	18
Derin Atakan	Women's Formula Kite	15	16	15	15	12	~~21~~	Cancelled										Did not advance									73	16

Medal race events

Athlete	Event	Race													Net points	Final rank
Athlete	Event	1	2	3	4	5	6	7	8	9	10	11	12	M*	Net points	Final rank
Yiğit Yalçın Çıtak	Men's ILCA 7	18	13	37	14	22	9	44	20	C	C	—N/a		EL	177	23
Ecem Güzel	Women's ILCA 6	9	22	24	21	22	9	1	32	21	C	—N/a		EL	129	18
Lara Nalbantoğlu; Deniz Çınar	Mixed 470	14	9	15	8	~~18~~	11	14	5	C	C	—N/a		EL	76	16
Beste Kaynakçı; Alican Kaynar	Mixed Nacra 17	19	13	17	19	18	20	12	20	14	13	9	C	EL	172	18

M = Medal race; EL = Eliminated – did not advance into the medal race; C = Cancelled race

== Shooting ==
Turkish shooters achieved quota places for the following events based on their results at the 2022 and 2023 ISSF World Championships, 2022, 2023, and 2024 European Championships, 2023 European Games, and 2024 ISSF World Olympic Qualification Tournament.

Athlete	Event	Qualification		Final	
Athlete	Event	Points	Rank	Points	Rank
İsmail Keleş	Men's 10 m air pistol	577	10	Did not advance	
Yusuf Dikeç	Men's 10 m air pistol	576	13	Did not advance	
Oğuzhan Tüzün	Men's trap	121	15	Did not advance	
Şimal Yılmaz	Women's 10 m air pistol	557	42	Did not advance	
Şimal Yılmaz	Women's 25 m pistol	574	28	Did not advance	
Şevval İlayda Tarhan	Women's 10 m air pistol	577	7 Q	135.6	7
Şevval İlayda Tarhan	Women's 25 m pistol	579	21	Did not advance	
Rümeysa Pelin Kaya	Women's trap	117	13	Did not advance	
Sena Can	Women's skeet	110	27	Did not advance	

Mixed

Athlete	Event	Qualification		Final / BM	
Athlete	Event	Points	Rank	Points	Rank
Yusuf Dikeç; Şevval İlayda Tarhan	10 m air pistol team	582	1 Q	Arunović / Mikec (SRB); L (14–16)	2nd place, silver medalist(s)
İsmail Keleş; Şimal Yılmaz	10 m air pistol team	569	15	Did not advance	

== Swimming ==
Turkish swimmers achieved the entry standards in the following events for Paris 2024 (a maximum of two swimmers under the Olympic Qualifying Time (OST) and potentially at the Olympic Consideration Time (OCT)):

Men's

Athlete	Event	Heat		Semifinal		Final	
Athlete	Event	Time	Rank	Time	Rank	Time	Rank
Berke Saka	Men's 100 m backstroke	55.85	41	Did not advance			
Berke Saka	Men's 200 m individual medley	2:01.99	17	Did not advance			
Kuzey Tunçelli	Men's 800 m freestyle	7:47.29	11	—N/a		Did not advance	
Kuzey Tunçelli	Men's 1500 m freestyle	14:45.27	5 Q	—N/a		14:41.22	5
Kuzey Tunçelli	Men's marathon 10 km	—N/a				2:02:58.1	23
Emir Batur Albayrak	Men's 1500 m freestyle	15:23.21	23	—N/a		Did not advance	
Emir Batur Albayrak	Men's marathon 10 km	—N/a				DNF	
Berkay Ömer Öğretir	Men's 100 m breaststroke	1:00.36	21	Did not advance			

Women's

Athlete	Event	Heat		Semifinal		Final	
Athlete	Event	Time	Rank	Time	Rank	Time	Rank
Ela Naz Özdemir; Gizem Güvenç; Ecem Dönmez; Zehra Bilgin	4 × 200 m freestyle relay	8:05.18	16	—N/a		Did not advance	

== Table tennis ==
Turkey entered one table tennis player into Paris 2024. Sibel Altınkaya qualified for the games by virtue of being nominated into the top twelve ranked players in the women's single class through the release of the final world ranking for Paris 2024.

Athlete	Event	Preliminary	Round of 64	Round of 32	Round of 16	Quarterfinals	Semifinals	Final / BM	
Athlete	Event	Opposition Result	Opposition Result	Opposition Result	Opposition Result	Opposition Result	Opposition Result	Opposition Result	Rank
Sibel Altınkaya	Women's singles	Bye	Ni X (LUX); L 2–4	Did not advance					

== Taekwondo ==
Turkey qualified five athletes to compete at the games. All of them qualified for Paris 2024 by virtue of finishing within the top five in the Olympic rankings in their respective division.

Athlete	Event	Round of 16	Quarterfinals	Semifinals	Repechage	Final / BM	
Athlete	Event	Opposition Result	Opposition Result	Opposition Result	Opposition Result	Opposition Result	Rank
Hakan Reçber	Men's −68 kg	Maiga (BUR); W 2–0	Kareem (JOR); L 0–2	Did not advance	Pontes (BRA); L 1–2	Did not advance	7
Emre Kutalmış Ateşli	Men's +80 kg	Alba (CUB); L 0–2	Did not advance				11
Merve Kavurat	Women's −49 kg	Matonti (ITA); W 2–0	Guo (CHN); L 0–2	Did not advance	Dina Pouryounes (EOR); W 2–0	Lena Stojković (CRO); L 0–2	5
Hatice Kübra İlgün	Women's −57 kg	Kim (KOR); L 0–2	Did not advance		Park (CAN); L 0–2	Did not advance	7
Nafia Kuş	Women's +67 kg	Aguirre (CHI); W 2–1	Abo-Alrub (JOR); W 2–1	Laurin (FRA); L 2–0	Direct to BM	McGowan (GBR); W 1–2	3rd place, bronze medalist(s)

== Volleyball ==
=== Indoor ===
Summary

Team	Event	Group stage				Quarterfinal	Semifinal	Final / BM	
Team	Event	Opposition Score	Opposition Score	Opposition Score	Rank	Opposition Score	Opposition Score	Opposition Score	Rank
Turkey women's	Women's tournament	Netherlands; W 3–2	Dominican Republic; W 3–1	Italy; L 0–3	2 Q	China; W 3–2	Italy; L 3–0	Brazil; L 3-1	4

==== Women's tournament ====
Turkey women's volleyball team qualified for the Olympics by winning the pool B round and securing one of two available berths at the 2023 Women's Olympic Qualification Tournaments in Tokyo, Japan.

Team roster

The roster was announced on 8 July 2024.

Head coach: (Italy) Daniele Santarelli

- 1 Gizem Örge L
- 3 Cansu Özbay S
- 4 Melissa Vargas OP
- 7 Hande Baladın OH
- 9 Meliha Diken OH
- 11 Derya Cebecioğlu OH
- 12 Elif Şahin S
- 14 Eda Erdem Dündar (c) MB
- 18 Zehra Güneş MB
- 19 Aslı Kalaç MB
- 22 İlkin Aydın OH
- 99 Ebrar Karakurt OH

Group play

Pos	Team	Pld	W	L	Pts	SW	SL	SR	SPW	SPL	SPR	Qualification
1	Italy	3	3	0	9	9	1	9.000	253	199	1.271	Quarter-finals
2	Turkey	3	2	1	5	6	6	1.000	250	262	0.954	Quarter-finals
3	Dominican Republic	3	1	2	3	5	7	0.714	264	284	0.930	Quarter-finals
4	Netherlands	3	0	3	1	3	9	0.333	260	282	0.922	

Source: Olympics
Rules for classification: Tiebreakers

29 July 2024; 09:00	Turkey	3–2	Netherlands	South Paris Arena 1, Paris; Attendance: 9,471; Referees: Denny Cespedes (DOM), Stefano Cesare (ITA)
29 July 2024; 09:00	(19–25, 19–25, 25–22, 25–22, 15–13); P2 Report			South Paris Arena 1, Paris; Attendance: 9,471; Referees: Denny Cespedes (DOM), Stefano Cesare (ITA)

1 August 2024; 09:00	Turkey	3–1	Dominican Republic	South Paris Arena 1, Paris; Attendance: 9,465; Referees: Karina Rene (ARG), Fabrice Collados (FRA)
1 August 2024; 09:00	(21–25, 25–18, 25–22, 25–15); P2 Report			South Paris Arena 1, Paris; Attendance: 9,465; Referees: Karina Rene (ARG), Fabrice Collados (FRA)

4 August 2024; 09:00	Italy	3–0	Turkey	South Paris Arena 1, Paris; Attendance: 9,384; Referees: Sumie Myoi (JPN), Hamid Al-Rousi (UAE)
4 August 2024; 09:00	(25–14, 25–16, 25–21); P2 Report			South Paris Arena 1, Paris; Attendance: 9,384; Referees: Sumie Myoi (JPN), Hamid Al-Rousi (UAE)

Quarterfinal

6 August 2024; 09:00	China	2–3	Turkey	South Paris Arena 1, Paris; Attendance: 9,271; Referees: Scott Dziewirz (CAN), Hamid Al-Rousi (UAE)
6 August 2024; 09:00	(25–23, 21–25, 24–26, 25–21, 12–15); P2 Report			South Paris Arena 1, Paris; Attendance: 9,271; Referees: Scott Dziewirz (CAN), Hamid Al-Rousi (UAE)

Semifinal

8 August 2024; 20:00	Turkey	0–3	Italy	South Paris Arena 1, Paris; Attendance: 9,309; Referees: Wojciech Maroszek (POL), Sumie Myoi (JPN)
8 August 2024; 20:00	(22–25, 19–25, 22–25); P2 Report			South Paris Arena 1, Paris; Attendance: 9,309; Referees: Wojciech Maroszek (POL), Sumie Myoi (JPN)

Bronze medal game

10 August 2024; 17:15	Brazil	3–1	Turkey	South Paris Arena 1, Paris; Attendance: 9,151; Referees: Sumie Myoi (JPN), Karina Rene (ARG)
10 August 2024; 17:15	(25–21, 27–25, 22–25, 25–15); P2 Report			South Paris Arena 1, Paris; Attendance: 9,151; Referees: Sumie Myoi (JPN), Karina Rene (ARG)

== Weightlifting ==
Turkey entered one weightlifter into the Olympic competition. Muhammed Furkan Özbek (men's 73 kg) secured one of the top ten slots in his weight divisions based on the IWF Olympic Qualification Rankings.

Athlete	Event	Snatch		Clean & Jerk		Total	Rank
Athlete	Event	Result	Rank	Result	Rank	Total	Rank
Muhammed Furkan Özbek	Men's −73 kg	150	7	191	3	341	4

== Wrestling ==
Turkey qualified one wrestler for each of the following events. Six wrestlers qualified for the games with a top five result through the 2023 World Championships in Belgrade, Serbia; three wrestlers qualified for the games by winning the semifinal match at the 2024 European Qualification Tournament in Baku, Azerbaijan; and two wrestlers qualified for the games through the 2024 World Qualification Tournament in Istanbul, Turkey.

Men's freestyle

Athlete	Event	Round of 16	Quarterfinal	Semifinal	Repechage	Final / BM	
Athlete	Event	Opposition Result	Opposition Result	Opposition Result	Opposition Result	Opposition Result	Rank
İbrahim Çiftçi	97 kg	Mchedlidze (UKR); L 1-5	Did not advance				14
Taha Akgül	125 kg	Smith (PUR); W 10–0	Ligeti (HUN); W 8–0	Zare (IRI); L 1-2	—N/a	Aiaal Lazarev (KGZ); W 7-0	3rd place, bronze medalist(s)

Men's Greco-Roman

Athlete	Event	Round of 32	Round of 16	Quarterfinal	Semifinal	Repechage	Final / BM	
Athlete	Event	Opposition Result	Opposition Result	Opposition Result	Opposition Result	Opposition Result	Opposition Result	Rank
Enes Başar	60 kg	Tibilov (SRB); W 8–7	Arnăut (ROM); L 2–4	Did not advance				8
Burhan Akbudak	77 kg	—N/a	Lévai (HUN); L 1–2	Did not advance				10
Ali Cengiz	87 kg	—N/a	Kułynycz (POL); L 1–3	Did not advance				10
Hamza Bakır	130 kg	—N/a	Mohamed (EGY); L 1–3 (VBF)	Did not advance				14

Women's freestyle

Athlete	Event	Round of 16	Quarterfinal	Semifinal	Repechage	Final / BM	
Athlete	Event	Opposition Result	Opposition Result	Opposition Result	Opposition Result	Opposition Result	Rank
Evin Demirhan Yavuz	50 kg	Guzmán (CUB); L 6–7	Did not advance				9
Zeynep Yetgil	53 kg	Panghal (IND); W 10–0	Wendle (GER); L 2–5 (VBF)	Did not advance			8
Nesrin Baş	62 kg	Miracle (USA); L 2–12	Did not advance				12
Buse Tosun Çavuşoğlu	68 kg	Elor (USA); L 2-10	Did not advance		Chołuj (POL); W 4-3	Sol-gum (PRK); W 4-2	3rd place, bronze medalist(s)
Yasemin Adar Yiğit	76 kg	Di Stasio (CAN); W 8–2	Kagami (JPN); L 0–3	Did not advance	Reasco (ECU); L 1–3	Did not advance	8

== See also ==
- Turkey at the 2024 Winter Youth Olympics
- Turkey at the 2024 Summer Paralympics
