= Archery at the 2026 Mediterranean Games =

Archery competition

- Venue: Nuovo Palazzetto dello Sport
- Dates: 26 – 28 August

The archery event at the 2026 Mediterranean Games was held in Crispiano, Italy, from 26 to 28 August 2026.

== Medal summary ==
=== Medalists ===
| Event | Gold | Silver | Bronze |
|---|---|---|---|
| Men's individual | Thomas Chirault; France | Francesco Gregori; Italy | Andrés Temiño; Spain |
| Men's team | Spain; Diego Conde; Yun Sánchez; Andrés Temiño | France; Thomas Chirault; Kylan Hepp; Romain Viale | Turkey; Berkay Akkoyun; Mete Gazoz; Berkim Tümer |
| Women's individual | Lisa Barbelin; France | Elia Canales; Spain | Paula Álvarez; Spain |
| Women's team | Turkey; Elif Berra Gökkır; Gizem Özkan; Dünya Yenihayat | France; Lisa Barbelin; Caroline Lopez; Lai-Tsan Randriantsara | Spain; Paula Álvarez; Elia Canales; Leyre Fernández |
| Mixed team | France; Caroline Lopez; Thomas Chirault | Turkey; Dünya Yenihayat; Mete Gazoz | Spain; Elia Canales; Andrés Temiño |

=== Medal table ===
* Host nation (Italy)

| Rank | Nation | Gold | Silver | Bronze | Total |
|---|---|---|---|---|---|
| 1 | France | 3 | 2 | 0 | 5 |
| 2 | Spain | 1 | 1 | 4 | 6 |
| 3 | Turkey | 1 | 1 | 1 | 3 |
| 4 | Italy* | 0 | 1 | 0 | 1 |
| Totals (4 entries) | | 5 | 5 | 5 | 15 |
