= 2025 European Indoor Archery Championships =

- Venue: İlkadim Archery Facilities
- Location: Turkey, Samsun
- Start date: 17 February
- End date: 23 February
- Competitors: 235 from 23 nations

The 2025 European Indoor Archery Championships was the 21st edition of the European Indoor Archery Championships. The event was held in Samsun, Turkey from February 17 to 23, 2025. A maximum number of three (3) athletes per country can be registered into each category and divisions of the event. This competition will be organized following the WA and WAE competition rules in divisions Recurve, Compound and Barebow with both age categories of Senior Men and Women and Under 21 Men and Women.

== Competition schedule ==
All times are (UTC+3)

Date	Time	Event
19 February	09:30-12:15	Qualification Rounds
20 February	09:30-12:15	Individual Eliminations, ¼ and ½ Finals
20 February	14:30-17:15	U21 Individual Eliminations, ¼ and ½ Finals
20 February	18:00-20:45	Barebow Eliminations
21 February	09:30-12:30	Teams Eliminations
21 February	14:00-19:30	U21 Teams Eliminations
21 February	18:00-20:45	Barebow Teams Eliminations
22 February	09:00-12:15	U21 Teams Bronze & Gold Finals
22 February	14:00-18:10	U21 Individuals Bronze & Gold Finals
23 February	09:00-12:15	Teams Bronze & Gold Finals
23 February	14:00-17:40	Individuals Bronze & Gold Finals

== Medals table ==
* Host nation (Turkey)

Rank	Nation	Gold	Silver	Bronze	Total
1	Italy	10	4	6	20
2	Turkey*	9	9	2	20
3	Individual Neutral Athletes	2	0	2	4
4	France	1	2	3	6
5	Romania	1	2	1	4
6	Bulgaria	1	0	0	1
7	Iceland	0	2	3	5
8	Slovakia	0	2	0	2
9	Poland	0	1	0	1
9	San Marino	0	1	0	1
11	Denmark	0	0	2	2
12	Croatia	0	0	1	1
12	Georgia	0	0	1	1
12	Moldova	0	0	1	1
Totals (14 entries)		24	23	22	69

== Medal summary ==
=== Recurve ===
Event	Gold	Silver	Bronze
Men's individual	Ivan Banchev; Bulgaria	Mete Gazoz; Turkey	Arsalan Baldanov; Individual Neutral Athletes
Women's individual	Nurinisso Makhmudova; Individual Neutral Athletes	Victoria Sebastian; France	Lisa Barbelin; France
Men's team	Italy; Alessandro Paoli; Massimiliano Mandia; Matteo Borsani	Turkey; Mete Gazoz; Abdullah Yıldırmış; Berkim Tümer	Moldova; Dan Olaru; Andrei Belici; Sergiu Sorici
Women's team	Italy; Chiara Rebagliati; Lucilla Boari; Roberta Di Francesco	Slovakia; Denisa Baránková; Elena Bendíkova; Kristína Drusková	Turkey; Fatma Maraşlı; Gizem Özkan; Zeynep Köse
U-21 Men's individual	Berkay Akkoyun; Turkey	Mustafa Özdemir; Turkey	Francesco Poerio Piterà; Italy
U-21 Women's individual	Elif Berra Gökkır; Turkey	Dünya Yenihayat; Turkey	Altana Garmaeva; Individual Neutral Athletes
U-21 Men's team	Turkey; Berkay Akkoyun; Mustafa Özdemir; Kutay Tek	Romania; Nectarios Condurache; Tamas Moreh; Marco Tanasescu	Italy; Davide De Giovanni; Francesco Poerio Piterà; Emiliano Rampon
U-21 Women's team	Turkey; Melissa Ahmed; Elif Berra Gökkır; Dünya Yenihayat	Italy; Chiara Compagno; Lucia Elena; Martina Sona	Georgia; Gvantsa Archvadze; Ana Bolokadze; Nia Gatenadze

=== Compound ===
Event	Gold	Silver	Bronze
Men's individual	Nicolas Girard; France	Jozef Bosansky; Slovakia	Mathias Fullerton; Denmark
Women's individual	Elisa Roner; Italy	Marcella Tonioli; Italy	Giulia Di Nardo; Italy
Men's team	Italy; Alex Boggiatto; Marco Bruno; Michea Godano	Poland; Rafal Dobrowolski; Przemysław Konecki; Łukasz Przybylski	Denmark; Martin Damsbo; Mathias Fullerton; Martin Laursen
Women's team	Italy; Marcella Tonioli; Elisa Roner; Giulia Di Nardo	Turkey; Hazal Burun; Ayşe Bera Süzer; Emine Rabia Oğuz	Iceland; Freyja Dís Benediktsdóttir; Eowyn Mamalias; Anna Maria Alfreðsdóttir
U-21 Men's individual	Eren Kırca; Turkey	Batuhan Levent Sağlam; Turkey	Yağız Sezgin; Turkey
U-21 Women's individual	Begüm Yuva; Turkey	Hatice Efdal Köse; Turkey	Isabella Bacerio; Italy
U-21 Men's team	Italy; Fabrizio Aloisi; Lorenzo Gubbini; Marco Tosco	Turkey; Eren Kırca; Batuhan Levent Sağlam; Yağız Sezgin	Croatia; Mihael Čurić; Nikola Portner Pavićević; Maks Posavec
U-21 Women's team	Turkey; Selin Çakır; Hatice Efdal Köse; Begüm Yuva	Italy; Isabella Bacerio; Caterina Gallo; Veronica Pavin	France; Léa Girault; Chloé Leroy; Romane Sablin

=== Barebow ===
Event	Gold	Silver	Bronze
Men's individual	Ciprian Baican; Romania	Simone Barbieri; Italy	David Jackson; France
Women's individual	Giulia Mantilli; Italy	Kristina Maria Pruccoli; San Marino	Cinzia Noziglia; Italy
Men's team	Italy; Simone Barbieri; Ferruccio Berti; Giuseppe Seimandi	France; Vincent Houdart; David Jackson; Jerome Souchaud	Romania; Ciprian Baican; Alexandru Koteles; Ioan-Razvan Rusov
Women's team	Italy; Alessandra Bigogno; Giulia Mantilli; Cinzia Noziglia	Romania; Florentina Cristina Bacin; Maria Loredana Mogos; Elena Topliceanu	Iceland; Astrid Daxböck; Valgerdur Hjaltested; Guðbjörg Reynisdóttir
U-21 Men's individual	Viktor Darkhanov; Individual Neutral Athletes	Baldur Freyr Arnason; Iceland	Giulio Locchi; Italy
U-21 Women's individual	Linda Grezzani; Italy	Dilara Ecem Deniz; Turkey	Heba Robertsdottir; Iceland
U-21 Men's team	Turkey; Yunus Dursun; Ufuk Genç; Efe Kızılkaya	Iceland; Baldur Freyr Arnason; Henry Johnston; Ragnar Smari Jónasson	Only 2 teams
U-21 Women's team	Turkey; Dilara Ecem Deniz; Melisa Sağdaş; Sündüs Sude Tak	Only 1 team	

== Participating countries ==
A total of 235 competitors from the national teams of the following 23 countries were registered to compete at 2025 European Indoor Archery Championships.

1. Austria (1)
2. Belgium (1)
3. Bulgaria (10)
4. Croatia (14)
5. Denmark (4)
6. France (12)
7. Faroe Islands (3)
8. Georgia (8)
9. Greece (4)
10. Ireland (1)
11. Iceland (28)
12. Italy (32)
13. Lithuania (10)
14. Moldova (9)
15. Netherlands (1)
16. Poland (4)
17. Portugal (5)
18. Romania (13)
19. San Marino (1)
20. Serbia (1)
21. Switzerland (1)
22. Slovakia (12)
23. Turkey (36)
24. Individual Neutral Athletes (24)

== Results ==
=== Recurve men's individual ===
Rank	Name	Nation	Score	10	9
1	Mete Gazoz	Turkey	592	54	5
2	Thomas Chirault	France	592	52	8
3	Matteo Borsani	Italy	585	46	13
4	Alen Remar	Croatia	584	48	8
5	Berkim Tümer	Turkey	584	44	16
6	Ivan Banchev	Bulgaria	583	46	12
7	Arsalan Baldanov	Authorised Neutral Athletes	581	41	19
8	Abdullah Yıldırmış	Turkey	580	42	16
9	Alessandro Paoli	Italy	580	40	20
10	Maksim Malafeev	Authorised Neutral Athletes	578	41	16
11	Massimiliano Mandia	Italy	578	40	18
12	Anri Basiladze	Georgia	575	38	20
13	Dan Olaru	Moldova	574	37	20
14	Thomas Aubert	Switzerland	569	33	23
15	Andrei Belici	Moldova	545	22	26
16	Maarten Vanhaeren	Belgium	539	20	25
17	Sergiu Sorici	Moldova	526	16	26
18	Georg Elfarsson	Iceland	399	5	9

Semifinals
1	(Turkey) Mete Gazoz	6	29	30	30	29	30
13	(Moldova) Dan Olaru	4	27	30	29	30	30
6	(Bulgaria) Ivan Banchev	6^{10+}	30	30	29	28	26
7	(Individual Neutral Athletes) Arsalan Baldanov	5^{10}	29	29	29	29	30

Gold medal match
1	(Turkey) Mete Gazoz	3	29	30	30	28	29
6	(Bulgaria) Ivan Banchev	7	30	30	28	29	30
Bronze medal match
13	(Moldova) Dan Olaru	2	29	29	28	29
7	(Individual Neutral Athletes) Arsalan Baldanov	6	29	29	29	30

1/16 finals
17	(Moldova) Sergiu Sorici	4	28	28	24	25	25
16	(Belgium) Maarten Vanhaeren	6	26	26	29	29	27

1/8 finals
1	(Turkey) Mete Gazoz	6	29	26	29	30
16	(Belgium) Maarten Vanhaeren	2	28	27	27	26
9	(Italy) Alessandro Paoli	6	28	29	30	30	28
8	(Turkey) Abdullah Yıldırmış	4	30	29	29	29	28

Quarterfinals
1	(Turkey) Mete Gazoz	6	29	30	30	29
9	(Italy) Alessandro Paoli	2	29	29	29	29

1/16 finals

1/8 finals
5	(Turkey) Berkim Tümer	6	30	30	29	30
12	(Georgia (country)) Anri Basiladze	2	28	30	29	29
13	(Moldova) Dan Olaru	6	30	29	27	30	30
4	(Croatia) Alen Remar	4	30	28	29	29	30

Quarterfinals
5	(Turkey) Berkim Tümer	4	30	30	27	30	29
13	(Moldova) Dan Olaru	6	29	30	30	30	30

1/16 finals

1/8 finals
3	(Italy) Matteo Borsani	6	29	30	30	28
14	(Switzerland) Thomas Aubert	2	28	28	30	28
11	(Italy) Massimiliano Mandia	5^{10}	29	29	27	29	29
6	(Bulgaria) Ivan Banchev	6^{10+}	30	29	29	27	20

Quarterfinals
3	(Italy) Matteo Borsani	4	29	29	29	30	28
6	(Bulgaria) Ivan Banchev	6	28	30	30	29	30

1/16 finals
15	(Moldova) Andrei Belici	6	29	28	28
18	(Iceland) Georg Elfarsson	0	22	22	23

1/8 finals
7	(Individual Neutral Athletes) Arsalan Baldanov	6	29	29	29	29	30
10	(Individual Neutral Athletes) Maksim Malafeev	4	29	29	27	30	29
15	(Moldova) Andrei Belici	1	28	30	26	29
2	(France) Thomas Chirault	7	30	30	30	30

Quarterfinals
7	(Individual Neutral Athletes) Arsalan Baldanov	6	29	30	29	30	29
2	(France) Thomas Chirault	4	30	30	20	29	29

=== Recurve women's individual ===
Rank	Name	Nation	Score	10	9
1	Chiara Rebagliati	Italy	587	47	13
2	Victoria Sebastian	France	586	46	14
3	Roberta Di Francesco	Italy	583	44	15
4	Lucilla Boari	Italy	582	42	18
5	Nurinisso Makhmudova	Authorised Neutral Athletes	580	43	14
6	Denisa Baránková	Slovakia	579	40	19
7	Tsiko Putkaradze	Georgia	578	39	20
8	Balzhin Damdinova	Authorised Neutral Athletes	578	38	22
9	Lisa Barbelin	France	577	42	13
10	Elisabeth Straka	Austria	577	39	19
11	Fatma Maraşlı	Turkey	576	37	22
12	Elena Bendíkova	Slovakia	576	36	24
13	Gizem Özkan	Turkey	571	32	27
14	Ilona Hollander	Netherlands	569	34	21
15	Mădălina Amăistroaie	Romania	568	31	26
16	Zeynep Köse	Turkey	565	32	23
17	Mariia Taraiarova	Authorised Neutral Athletes	565	28	30
18	Alexandra Mîrca	Moldova	562	33	24
19	Kristína Drusková	Slovakia	557	35	17
20	Sarah Russell	Ireland	557	29	21
21	Dobromira Danailova	Bulgaria	553	30	19
22	Nikoli Streapunina	Moldova	548	21	27
23	Valgerdur Hjaltested	Iceland	548	18	34
24	Marin Anita Hilmarsdottir	Iceland	547	22	28
25	Nadejda Celan	Moldova	526	21	16
26	Astrid Daxbock	Iceland	454	10	18

Semifinals
9	(France) Lisa Barbelin	2	29	29	30	29
5	(Individual Neutral Athletes) Nurinisso Makhmudova	6	29	30	30	30
14	(Netherlands) Ilona Hollander	4	29	29	27	29	29
2	(France) Victoria Sebastian	6	30	29	30	27	29

Gold medal match
5	(Individual Neutral Athletes) Nurinisso Makhmudova	6^{10}	29	30	29	28	29
2	(France) Victoria Sebastian	5^{9}	30	28	30	27	29
Bronze medal match
9	(France) Lisa Barbelin	6	30	29	28	30
14	(Netherlands) Ilona Hollander	2	28	28	29	29

1/16 finals
17	(Individual Neutral Athletes) Mariia Taraiarova	5^{8}	29	28	28	29	27
16	(Turkey) Zeynep Köse	6^{10}	27	29	28	29	27
9	(France) Lisa Barbelin	7	28	30	29	29
24	(Iceland) Marin Hilmarsdottir	1	28	27	27	26
25	(Moldova) Nadejda Celan	1	25	27	27	25
8	(Individual Neutral Athletes) Balzhin Damdinova	7	30	27	29	30

1/8 finals
1	(Italy) Chiara Rebagliati	1	28	27	29	27
16	(Turkey) Zeynep Köse	7	28	30	30	29
9	(France) Lisa Barbelin	6	29	29	29
8	(Individual Neutral Athletes) Balzhin Damdinova	0	28	28	27

Quarterfinals
16	(Turkey) Zeynep Köse	5^{8}	27	28	28	30	28
9	(France) Lisa Barbelin	6^{9}	30	29	28	26	19

1/16 finals
21	(Bulgaria) Dobromira Danailova	2	25	27	27	26
12	(Slovakia) Elena Bendíkova	6	27	26	28	28
13	(Turkey) Gizem Özkan	6	28	28	29	30
20	(Republic of Ireland) Sarah Russell	2	29	26	26	28

1/8 finals
5	(Individual Neutral Athletes) Nurinisso Makhmudova	6	29	29	30
12	(Slovakia) Elena Bendíkova	0	28	27	27
13	(Turkey) Gizem Özkan	6	29	27	29	29	28
4	(Italy) Lucilla Boari	4	28	29	28	29	28

Quarterfinals
5	(Individual Neutral Athletes) Nurinisso Makhmudova	6	30	30	29	28	27
13	(Turkey) Gizem Özkan	4	29	28	30	28	27

1/16 finals
19	(Slovakia) Kristína Drusková	4	29	28	28	29	25
14	(Netherlands) Ilona Hollander	6	29	28	30	27	29
11	(Turkey) Fatma Maraşlı	6	28	27	30	30
22	(Moldova) Nikoli Streapunina	2	27	30	26	23

1/8 finals
3	(Italy) Roberta Di Francesco	4	29	28	29	29	28
14	(Netherlands) Ilona Hollander	6	29	29	27	29	29
11	(Turkey) Fatma Maraşlı	2	29	27	30	27
6	(Slovakia) Denisa Baránková	6	29	29	30	29

Quarterfinals
14	(Netherlands) Ilona Hollander	6	28	29	28	26	30
6	(Slovakia) Denisa Baránková	4	27	29	27	29	30

1/16 finals
7	(Georgia (country)) Tsiko Putkaradze	7	29	28	29	30
26	(Iceland) Astrid Daxbock	1	28	28	25	9
23	(Iceland) Valgerdur Hjaltested	25	28	27
10	(Austria) Elisabeth Straka	6	30	29	29
15	(Romania) Mădălina Amăistroaie	4	30	30	27	29	28
18	(Moldova) Alexandra Mîrca	6	29	30	28	29	29

1/8 finals
7	(Georgia (country)) Tsiko Putkaradze	6^{10}	27	30	29	29	28
10	(Austria) Elisabeth Straka	5^{8}	30	29	30	29	27
18	(Moldova) Alexandra Mîrca	2	28	28	27	29
2	(France) Victoria Sebastian	6	30	28	28	29

Quarterfinals
7	(Georgia (country)) Tsiko Putkaradze	3	28	29	26	29	27
2	(France) Victoria Sebastian	7	29	29	29	28	30

=== Compound men's individual ===
Rank	Name	Nation	Score	10	9
1	Nicolas Girard	France	599	59	1
2	Jozef Bosansky	Slovakia	596	56	4
3	Mathias Fullerton	Denmark	595	55	5
4	Batuhan Akçaoğlu	Turkey	595	55	5
5	Łukasz Przybylski	Poland	594	54	6
6	Marco Bruno	Italy	592	52	8
7	Emircan Haney	Turkey	591	51	9
8	Michea Godano	Italy	591	51	9
9	Alex Boggiatto	Italy	591	51	9
10	Mario Vavro	Croatia	590	50	10
11	Martin Damsbo	Denmark	590	50	10
12	Ivan Zhulin	Authorised Neutral Athletes	588	48	12
13	Przemysław Konecki	Poland	588	48	12
14	Ahmet Can Yolaç	Turkey	588	48	12
15	Rui Pereira Baptista	Portugal	584	44	16
16	Bato Angarkhaev	Authorised Neutral Athletes	584	44	16
17	Rares Daniel Alexandrescu	Romania	583	43	17
18	Johannes Poulsen	Faroe Islands	583	43	17
19	Martin Laursen	Denmark	580	40	20
20	Ilia Silaev	Authorised Neutral Athletes	578	39	20
21	Jorge Alves	Portugal	576	38	21
22	Alfred Birgisson	Iceland	573	34	25
23	Rafal Dobrowolski	Poland	572	37	20
24	Nikkel Petersen	Faroe Islands	564	24	36
25	Jogvan Niclasen	Faroe Islands	562	24	34
26	Benedikt Máni Tryggvason	Iceland	514	8	38
27	Gummi Gudjonsson	Iceland	27	0	3

Semifinals
1	(France) Nicolas Girard	149
4	(Turkey) Batuhan Akçaoğlu	148
3	(Denmark) Mathias Fullerton	150^{10}
2	(Slovakia) Jozef Bosansky	150^{+10}

Finals
1	(France) Nicolas Girard	150
2	(Slovakia) Jozef Bosansky	143
Third place
4	(Turkey) Batuhan Akçaoğlu	148
3	(Denmark) Mathias Fullerton	149

Qualifications
(Romania) Rares Daniel Alexandrescu	146
(Individual Neutral Athletes) Bato Angarkhaev	148
(Italy) Alex Boggiatto	149
(Faroe Islands) Nikkel Petersen	140
(Faroe Islands) Jogvan Niclasen	142
(Italy) Michea Godano	148
(Portugal) Jorge Alves	146
(Individual Neutral Athletes) Ivan Zhulin	147
(Poland) Przemysław Konecki	147
(Individual Neutral Athletes) Ilia Silaev	143

Round of 16
(France) Nicolas Girard	150
(Individual Neutral Athletes) Bato Angarkhaev	147
(Italy) Alex Boggiatto	147^{9}
(Italy) Michea Godano	147^{10}
(Poland) Łukasz Przybylski	149
(Individual Neutral Athletes) Ivan Zhulin	148
(Poland) Przemysław Konecki	145
(Turkey) Batuhan Akçaoğlu	149

Quarterfinals
(France) Nicolas Girard	150
(Italy) Michea Godano	148
(Poland) Łukasz Przybylski	147
(Turkey) Batuhan Akçaoğlu	150

Semifinals
(France) Nicolas Girard	149
(Turkey) Batuhan Akçaoğlu	148

Qualifications
(Denmark) Martin Laursen	145
(Turkey) Ahmet Can Yolaç	146
(Denmark) Martin Damsbo	149
(Iceland) Alfred Birgisson	140
(Iceland) Gummi Gudjonsson	124
(Italy) Marco Bruno	149
(Turkey) Emircan Haney	147
(Iceland) Benedikt Máni Tryggvason	127
(Poland) Rafal Dobrowolski	145
(Croatia) Mario Vavro	149
(Portugal) Rui Pereira Baptista	148
(Faroe Islands) Johannes Poulsen	145

Round of 16
(Denmark) Mathias Fullerton	149
(Turkey) Ahmet Can Yolaç	146
(Denmark) Martin Damsbo	148
(Italy) Marco Bruno	147
(Turkey) Emircan Haney	149^{10}
(Croatia) Mario Vavro	149^{+10}
(Portugal) Rui Pereira Baptista	142
(Slovakia) Jozef Bosansky	148

Quarterfinals
(Denmark) Mathias Fullerton	149
(Denmark) Martin Damsbo	144
(Croatia) Mario Vavro	145
(Slovakia) Jozef Bosansky	147

Semifinals
(Denmark) Mathias Fullerton	150^{10}
(Slovakia) Jozef Bosansky	150^{+10}

=== Compound women's individual ===
Rank	Name	Nation	Score	10	9
1	Giulia Di Nardo	Italy	591	51	9
2	Elisa Roner	Italy	589	49	11
3	Amanda Mlinarić	Croatia	588	48	12
4	Marcella Tonioli	Italy	588	48	12
5	Arina Cherkezova	Authorised Neutral Athletes	587	47	13
6	Hazal Burun	Turkey	586	46	14
7	Ekaterina Rumiantseva	Authorised Neutral Athletes	586	46	14
8	Ayşe Bera Süzer	Turkey	584	44	16
9	Emine Rabia Oğuz	Turkey	582	42	18
10	Sofie Louise Dam	Denmark	579	39	21
11	Elizaveta Makhnenko	Authorised Neutral Athletes	578	38	22
12	Inga Timinskienė	Lithuania	577	37	23
13	Maria-Joao Ribeiro	Portugal	576	36	24
14	Lara Drobnjak	Croatia	565	28	29
15	Freyja Dís Benediktsdóttir	Iceland	563	25	33
16	Eowyn Mamalias	Iceland	559	20	39
17	Anna Maria Alfreðsdóttir	Iceland	559	19	41

Semifinals
1	(Italy) Giulia Di Nardo	147
4	(Italy) Marcella Tonioli	148
6	(Turkey) Hazal Burun	145
2	(Italy) Elisa Roner	148

Finals
4	(Italy) Marcella Tonioli	144
2	(Italy) Elisa Roner	148
Third place
1	(Italy) Giulia Di Nardo	146
6	(Turkey) Hazal Burun	144

Round of 32
(Iceland) Anna Maria Alfreðsdóttir	140
(Iceland) Eowyn Mamalias	139

Round of 16
(Italy) Giulia Di Nardo	149
(Iceland) Anna Maria Alfreðsdóttir	143
(Turkey) Emine Rabia Oğuz	146^{9}
(Turkey) Ayşe Bera Süzer	146^{10}
(Individual Neutral Athletes) Arina Cherkezova	142
(Lithuania) Inga Timinskienė	146
(Portugal) Maria-Joao Ribeiro	146
(Italy) Marcella Tonioli	147

Quarterfinals
(Italy) Giulia Di Nardo	149
(Turkey) Ayşe Bera Süzer	143
(Lithuania) Inga Timinskienė	142
(Italy) Marcella Tonioli	146

Semifinals
(Italy) Giulia Di Nardo	147
(Italy) Marcella Tonioli	148

Round of 32

Round of 16
(Croatia) Amanda Mlinarić	145
(Croatia) Lara Drobnjak	142
(Individual Neutral Athletes) Elizaveta Makhnenko	145^{10}
(Turkey) Hazal Burun	145^{10+}
(Individual Neutral Athletes) Ekaterina Rumiantseva	147
(Denmark) Sofie Louise Dam	145
(Iceland) Freyja Dís Benediktsdóttir	137
(Italy) Elisa Roner	149

Quarterfinals
(Croatia) Amanda Mlinarić	147^{10}
(Turkey) Hazal Burun	147^{10+}
(Individual Neutral Athletes) Ekaterina Rumiantseva	141
(Italy) Elisa Roner	147

Semifinals
(Turkey) Hazal Burun	145
(Italy) Elisa Roner	148
