= Dünya Yenihayat =

Turkish archer (born 2009)

Personal information
- Full name: Dünya Yenihayat
- Born: 2 May 2009 (age 17)

Sport
- Country: Turkey
- Sport: Archery
- Event: Recurve bow
- Club: İzmir BB
Medal record
Women's recurve bow
Representing Turkey
Archery World Cup
Silver medal – second place	2026 Puebla	Team
Bronze medal – third place	2025 Shanghai	Mixed team
European Indoor Championships
Gold medal – first place	2025 Samsun	U21 team
Silver medal – second place	2025 Samsun	U21 individual
European Grand Prix
Gold medal – first place	2024 Poreč	Mixed team
Bronze medal – third place	2024 Poreč	Team
Mediterranean Games
Gold medal – first place	2026 Taranto	Team
Silver medal – second place	2026 Taranto	Mixed team
Youth Olympic Games
Gold medal – first place	2026 Dakar	Individual
World Archery Youth Championships
Bronze medal – third place	2023 Limerick	U18 individual

Dünya Yenihayat (born 2 May 2009) is a Turkish archer. Competing in the recurve bow category, Yenihayat represents the Turkey national team and İzmir Büyükşehir Belediyesi Sports Club. She won the bronze medal in the U18 women's individual recurve event at the 2023 World Archery Youth Championships and became European champion in the U21 women's team recurve event at the 2025 European Indoor Archery Championships.

== Career ==
In 2023, Yenihayat won the bronze medal in the U18 women's individual recurve event at the 2023 World Archery Youth Championships held in Limerick, Ireland. After finishing second in the ranking round with 652 points, she defeated Moldova's Anastasia Cecanova 7–1 in the round of 32, the United States' Gabrielle Sasai 6–5 in a shoot-off in the round of 16 and China's Bao Yijing 6–4 in the quarter-finals. She lost 7–3 to China's Zhu Jingyi in the semi-finals, before defeating Chinese Taipei's Fong You-jhu 6–4 in the bronze-medal match.

In 2024, at the International Kahraman Bagatır Spring Arrows Tournament held in Turkey, Yenihayat set a Turkish record in the women's team recurve ranking round with Elif Berra Gökkır and Fatma Maraşlı, scoring 1978 points. The same year, she won the bronze medal in women's team recurve with Elif Berra Gökkır and Fatma Maraşlı at the first leg of the European Grand Prix held in Poreč, Croatia. At the same event in Poreč, she won the gold medal in mixed team recurve with Mete Gazoz; Turkey defeated Germany 6–0 in the final.

In 2025, Yenihayat won the silver medal in the U21 women's individual recurve event at the 2025 European Indoor Archery Championships held in Samsun, Turkey. At the same championships, she won the gold medal in U21 women's team recurve with Melissa Ahmed and Elif Berra Gökkır. In 2025, at the second leg of the Archery World Cup held in Shanghai, China, she won the bronze medal in mixed team recurve with Mete Gazoz. Turkey defeated Germany 6–2 in the bronze-medal match to reach the podium. In 2025, Yenihayat set a world record in the U18 women's recurve ranking round at the second leg of the Turkish Cup held in Antalya, scoring 695 points. The Turkish Archery Federation stated that the result was recorded as a world, European and Turkish record over a total score of 720 points. At the 2025 World Archery Championships held in Gwangju, South Korea, Yenihayat, Elif Berra Gökkır and Fatma Maraşlı scored 1985 points in the women's team recurve ranking round for Turkey. The Turkish Archery Federation announced that the national team had improved its previous Turkish record of 1978 points.

In 2026, at the first leg of the Archery World Cup held in Puebla, Mexico, Yenihayat won the silver medal in women's team recurve with Elif Berra Gökkır and Gizem Özkan. Turkey received a bye in the round of 16, then defeated India in the quarter-finals and host nation Mexico 5–4 in a shoot-off in the semi-finals. Turkey lost to China in the final and finished second. At the 2026 European Archery Championships held in Antalya, Turkey, Yenihayat competed in the women's individual recurve event. She finished 20th in the ranking round with 646 points. In the elimination rounds, she defeated Poland's Wioleta Myszor 6–0 and Croatia's Amanda Mlinarić 7–3 to reach the round of 16, where she lost 6–0 to Austria's Elisabeth Straka and finished 12th in the individual event. At the same championships, she finished fourth in women's team recurve with Elif Berra Gökkır and Gizem Özkan.

She won the gold medal in the team event with Gizem Özkan and Elif Berra Gökkır at the 2026 Mediterranean Games in Taranto, Italy.
