= Gizem Özkan =

Turkish archer (born 2002)

Personal information
- Nationality: Turkish
- Born: 25 August 2002 (age 24) Turkey
- Home town: Turkey

Sport
- Country: Turkey
- Sport: Archery
- Event: Recurve
Medal record
Women's Archery Recurve
Representing Turkey
World Cup
Silver medal – second place	2026 Puebla	Team
Mediterranean Games
Gold medal – first place	2026 Taranto	Team
European Indoor Championships
Bronze medal – third place	2025 Samsun	Team
Silver medal – second place	2022 Laško	Team

Gizem Özkan (born 25 August 2002) is a Turkish archer competing in the women's recurve bow event.

== Sport career ==
Özkan is a member of Okçular Vakfı SK in Istanbul.

At the 2022 European Indoor Archery Championships in Laško, Slovenia, she took the silver medal in the team event with Gülnaz Büşranur Coşkun and Assıya Yılmazer.

She competed in the individual and team events at the 2025 Summer World University Games in Essen, Germany, where she was not able to win any medal. She became bronze medalist with Fatma Maraşlı and Zeynep Köse 2025 European Indoor Championships in Samsun, Turkey.

She won the silver medal with Elif Berra Gökkır and Dünya Yenihaya at the first leg of the 2026 World Cup in Puebla, Mexico. She won the gold medal in the team event with Dünya Yenihayat and Elif Berra Gökkır at the 2026 Mediterranean Games in Taranto, Italy.
