= Hazal Burun =

Turkish compound archer

Personal information
- Nationality: Turkish
- Born: 27 September 2004 (age 21) Bencik, Yatağan, Muğla Province, Turkey

Sport
- Country: Turkey
- Sport: Archery
- Event: Compound bow
- Club: Muğla Büyükşehir Belediyesi
- Coached by: Ejder Sözen

Achievements and titles
- Highest world ranking: 11 (25 May 2026)
Medal record
Women's compound bow
Representing Turkey
European Championships
Gold medal – first place	2024 Essen	Team
Gold medal – first place	2026 Antalya	Individual
Bronze medal – third place	2024 Essen	Individual
European Indoor Championships
Gold medal – first place	2024 Varaždin	U21 individual
Gold medal – first place	2024 Varaždin	U21 team
Silver medal – second place	2025 Samsun	Team
European Games
Bronze medal – third place	2023 Kraków-Małopolska	Individual
World Cup
Gold medal – first place	2026 Shanghai	Team
Gold medal – first place	2026 Antalya	Team
Silver medal – second place	2024 Yecheon	Team
Silver medal – second place	2025 Shanghai	Mixed team
Silver medal – second place	2026 Shanghai	Mixed team
Bronze medal – third place	2025 Shanghai	Individual
Bronze medal – third place	2025 Shanghai	Team
European Grand Prix
Gold medal – first place	2025 Antalya	Individual
Gold medal – first place	2025 Antalya	Team
Gold medal – first place	2026 Antalya	Team
Gold medal – first place	2026 Antalya	Mixed team
Silver medal – second place	2026 Antalya	Individual
Bronze medal – third place	2024 Poreč	Individual
Conquest Cup
Gold medal – first place	2026 Istanbul	Team
Silver medal – second place	2024 Istanbul	Individual
Bronze medal – third place	2023 Istanbul	Individual
World Youth Championships
Silver medal – second place	2021 Wrocław	Team
Silver medal – second place	2023 Limerick	Individual
Bronze medal – third place	2021 Wrocław	Mixed team
European Youth Championships
Gold medal – first place	2024 Ploiești	Individual

Hazal Burun (born 27 September 2004 in Muğla) is a Turkish archer who competes in the compound bow discipline. She represents the Turkey national team and Muğla Büyükşehir Belediyesi Sports Club. At the 2026 European Archery Championships, she won the women's individual compound title, becoming the first Turkish woman to win a European individual compound archery title. She also won the women's team compound title and individual bronze medal at the 2024 European Archery Championships, and an individual bronze medal at the 2023 European Games.

== Career ==
Burun won international medals for Turkey in youth categories. At the 2021 World Archery Youth Championships, she won a silver medal in the women's team compound event and a bronze medal in the mixed team compound event.

In 2023, Burun won the bronze medal in the women's individual compound event at the 2023 European Games in Kraków, Poland. She defeated Finland's Satu Nisula 143–136 in the quarter-finals and lost 148–144 to Great Britain's Ella Gibson in the semi-finals. In the bronze medal match, she defeated Denmark's Tanja Gellenthien 146–138. At the 2023 World Archery Youth Championships in Limerick, Ireland, she won a silver medal in the under-21 women's individual compound event. Burun defeated Michelle Maria Bombarda, Han Seung-yeon, Lara Drobnjak and Hallie Boulton in the elimination rounds before losing 140–138 to Sydney Sullenberger of the United States in the final. She also won bronze in the women's individual compound event at the 11th International Conquest Cup in Istanbul.

In 2024, Burun set a world and European record with 598 points in the 18-metre ranking round in Antalya. The score was ratified by World Archery as a record in both the senior and under-21 women's compound categories. At the 2024 European Indoor Archery Championships in Varaždin, Croatia, she won gold in the under-21 women's individual compound event. She also won the under-21 women's team compound title with Turkey at the same championships. At the 2024 European Archery Championships in Essen, Germany, she won the bronze medal in the women's individual compound event. At the same competition, she won the women's team compound title with Ayşe Bera Süzer and Begüm Yuva, as Turkey defeated Spain in the final. At the second stage of the 2024 Archery World Cup in Yecheon, South Korea, she won silver with the Turkish women's team compound squad. She also won individual bronze at the European Grand Prix in Poreč and individual silver at the 12th International Conquest Cup in Istanbul. At the European Youth Championships in Ploiești, Romania, she won the under-21 women's individual compound title, defeating Great Britain's Chloe A'Bear 149–143 in the final.

In 2025, Burun won silver in the women's team compound event with Emine Rabia Oğuz and Ayşe Bera Süzer at the 2025 European Indoor Archery Championships in Samsun, Turkey. Turkey lost 233–230 to Italy in the final. At the first leg of the 2025 European Grand Prix in Antalya, she won gold in the women's individual compound event. At the same competition, she also won gold with Begüm Yuva and Emine Rabia Oğuz in the women's team compound event. At the second stage of the 2025 Archery World Cup in Shanghai, China, she won bronze in the women's individual compound event. At the same stage, she also won bronze with the Turkish women's team compound squad and silver in the mixed team compound event.

In 2026, Burun won gold with Yeşim Bostan and Defne Çakmak in the Turkish women's team compound event at the first leg of the European Grand Prix in Antalya. At the same competition, she won gold in the mixed team compound event with Emircan Haney and silver in the women's individual compound event. At the second stage of the 2026 Archery World Cup in Shanghai, she won gold with Emine Rabia Oğuz and Defne Çakmak in the women's team compound event. Turkey defeated the United States 234–231 in the final. At the same stage, she won silver in the mixed team compound event with Emircan Haney. At the 2026 European Archery Championships in Antalya, she won the women's individual compound title. She ranked first in the qualification round with 706 points and defeated Marie Marquardt, Meeri-Marita Paas, Lisell Jäätma and Sofie Louise Dam Marcussen in the elimination rounds. In the final, she beat Denmark's Tanja Gellenthien 147–146 to become European champion. At the third stage of the 2026 Archery World Cup in Antalya, she won gold with Emine Rabia Oğuz and Defne Çakmak in the women's team compound event. Turkey defeated the Mexico 233–231 in the final.
