= Archery at the 2024 Summer Olympics – Men's team =

Men's team at the Games of the XXXIII Olympiad
- Venue: Les Invalides
- Date: 25 July 2024 (ranking round); 29 July (match play)
- Competitors: 36 from 12 nations

Medalists
1st place, gold medalist(s)		Kim Je-deok; Kim Woo-jin; Lee Woo-seok	South Korea
2nd place, silver medalist(s)		Baptiste Addis; Thomas Chirault; Jean-Charles Valladont	France
3rd place, bronze medalist(s)		Mete Gazoz; Berkim Tümer; Abdullah Yıldırmış	Turkey

The men's team archery event is one of five archery events held at the 2024 Summer Olympics. It was held at Les Invalides, with the ranking round taking place on 25 July and match play on 29 July. This was the 10th consecutive appearance of the event, which has been held every Games since 1988.

== Qualification ==
The medal-winning squads (gold, silver, and bronze) in the team event from the 2023 Worlds will secure a quota place for their NOC at the Olympics. If the host country France obtains a team place at the Worlds, the vacant slot will be reallocated to the fourth-place team. Three more tickets will each be assigned to the men's and women's team recurve champions from the 2022 Asian Games, the 2023 European Games, and the 2024 Pan American Championships, respectively. The top three or four NOCs per gender (depending on whether France uses its direct host place or qualifies for the Games through the regular competition pathway) will secure three quota places at the Final Olympic Qualification Tournament (FOQT), scheduled for mid-2024, while the remaining team tickets will be awarded to the two highest-ranked NOCs vying for qualification through the world rankings after FOQT.

== Records ==
Prior to this competition, the existing world and Olympic records were as follows.

- 216 arrow ranking round

World record	South Korea; Im Dong-hyun, Kim Bub-min, Oh Jin-hyek	2087	London, Great Britain	27 July 2012
Olympic record	South Korea; Im Dong-hyun, Kim Bub-min, Oh Jin-hyek	2087	London, Great Britain	27 July 2012

== Schedule ==
All times are Central European Summer Time (UTC+2)

The schedule for the men's team event covers two separate days of competition.

Date	Time	Round
25 July 2024	14:15	Ranking round
29 July 2024	9:30; 14:15; 15:47; 16:48; 17:11	1/8 finals Quarter-finals; Semi-finals; Bronze medal match Gold medal match

== Results ==
=== Ranking round ===
The ranking round was held on the afternoon of 25 July 2024 at Les Invalides, Paris.

Q : qualified for quarter-finals; q: qualified for round of 16.

Rank	Nation	Archers	Score	10s	Xs	Notes
1	South Korea	Kim Je-deok; Kim Woo-jin; Lee Woo-seok	2049	120	49	Q
2	France	Baptiste Addis; Thomas Chirault; Jean-Charles Valladont	2025	102	35	Q
3	India	Dhiraj Bommadevara; Pravin Jadhav; Tarundeep Rai	2013	95	31	Q
4	China	Kao Wenchao; Li Zhongyuan; Wang Yan	1998	92	32	Q
5	Chinese Taipei	Lin Zih-siang; Tai Yu-hsuan; Tang Chih-chun	1992	95	34	q
6	Turkey	Mete Gazoz; Berkim Tümer; Abdullah Yıldırmış	1992	94	33	q
7	Italy	Federico Musolesi; Mauro Nespoli; Alessandro Paoli	1990	93	37	q
8	Japan	Takaharu Furukawa; Junya Nakanishi; Fumiya Saito	1972	83	28	q
9	Mexico	Matías Grande; Bruno Martínez; Carlos Rojas	1972	74	19	q
10	Kazakhstan	Ilfat Abdullin; Alexandr Yeremenko; Dauletkeldi Zhangbyrbay	1971	85	26	q
11	Colombia	Santiago Arcila; Jorge Enríquez; Andrés Hernández	1970	81	22	q
12	Great Britain	Conor Hall; Tom Hall; Alex Wise	1961	72	20	q

=== Competition bracket ===
Preliminary round
8	Japan	5	55	56	57
9	Mexico	1	53	56	56
5	Chinese Taipei	6	54	58	56
12	Great Britain	0	53	56	55
6	Turkey	5	51	56	55	56	29
11	Colombia	4	53	54	50	58	27
7	Italy	5	59	53	55	56	28
10	Kazakhstan	4	52	56	55	56	26

Quarter-finals
1	South Korea	6	57	59	57
8	Japan	0	53	55	54
5	Chinese Taipei	1	56	52	54
4	China	5	56	53	56
3	India	2	53	52	55	54
6	Turkey	6	57	57	54	58
7	Italy	2	56	54	49	54
2	France	6	55	56	58	55

Semi-finals
1	South Korea	5	54	57	56
4	China	1	54	54	53
6	Turkey	4	56	53	58	55	27
2	France	5	54	57	57	56	27+

Gold medal match
1	South Korea	5	57	59	59
2	France	1	57	58	56
Bronze medal match
4	China	2	54	57	54	54
6	Turkey	6	55	56	55	56

- The figure in italics signifies the set scores.

(+) Won the shoot-off by the arrow closer to the center of the target.
