= Martin Damsbo =

Danish archer (born 1985)

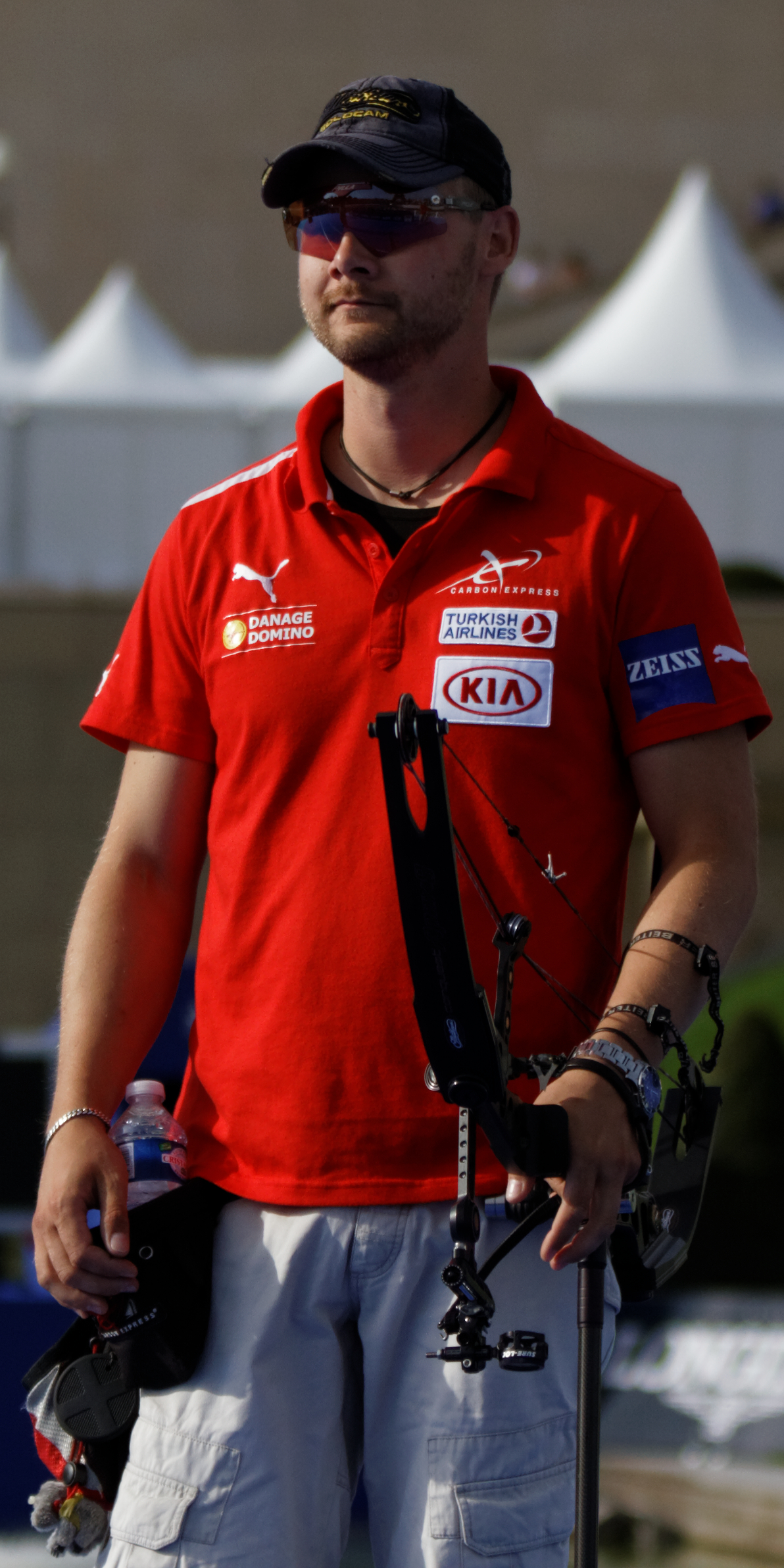
- Damsbo at the FITA World Cup in 2013

Personal information
- Born: 26 May 1985 (age 41) Odense, Denmark
Medal record
Men's archery
Representing Denmark
World Championships
| Gold medal – first place | 2013 Belek | Team |
| Silver medal – second place | 2011 Turin | Team |
| Silver medal – second place | 2023 Berlin | Team |
| Bronze medal – third place | 2007 Leipzig | Individual |
| Bronze medal – third place | 2015 Copenhagen | Team |
World Cup
| Gold medal – first place | 2009 Copenhagen | Mixed Team |
| Gold medal – first place | 2013 Paris | Individual |
| Silver medal – second place | 2026 Antalya | Team |
European Indoor Championships
| Silver medal – second place | 2026 Plovdiv | Team |
| Bronze medal – third place | 2025 Samsun | Team |

Martin Damsbo (born 26 May 1985) is a Danish compound archer. He has won medals at the World Archery Championships, a gold medal at the 2013 Archery World Cup Final, and achieved his highest world ranking of 2 in 2010.
