= Christian Stoddard =

American archer (born 2006)

Personal information
- Born: March 3, 2006 (age 20)

Sport
- Sport: Archery
- Event: Recurve
Medal record
Men's recurve archery
Representing the United States
World Championships
Silver medal – second place	2025 Gwangju	Team
Pan American Championships
Gold medal – first place	2026 Tlaxcala	Team
World Youth Championships
Gold medal – first place	2025 Winnipeg	Team
Silver medal – second place	2023 Limerick	Mixed team

Christian Stoddard (born March 3, 2006) is an American archer competing in men's recurve events. He won the silver medal in the men's team recurve event at the 2025 World Archery Championships.

== Early life ==
Stoddard attended Piedmont High School in Piedmont, California. He became interested in archery during his 4th grade class trip to Camp Augusta.

== Career ==
In July 2023, Stoddard competed at the 2023 World Archery Youth Championships and won a silver medal in the U18 mixed team event. In September 2025, he competed at the 2025 World Archery Championships and won a silver medal in the men's team event.

== Personal life ==
According to his social media, Stoddard currently trains and resides at the Chula Vista Elite Athlete Training Center (CVEATC) in Chula Vista, CA.
