= Mete Gazoz =

Turkish archer (born 1999)

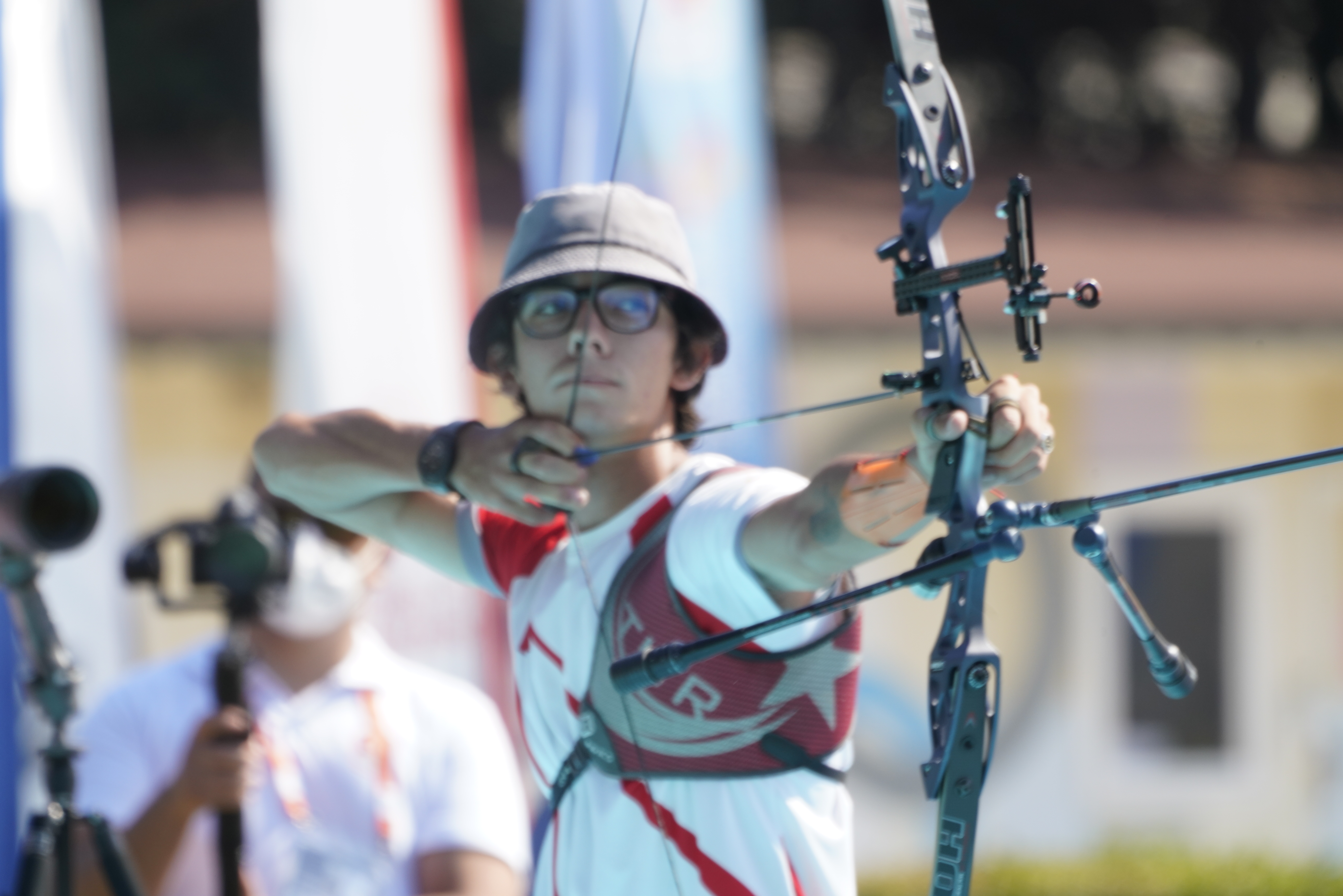
- Gazoz in 2021

Personal information
- Nickname: Gazoz
- Nationality: Turkish
- Born: 8 June 1999 (age 27) Istanbul, Turkey
- Height: 180 cm (5 ft 11 in)
- Weight: 60 kg (132 lb)

Sport
- Country: Turkey
- Sport: Archery
- Event: recurve
- Club: İstanbul Okçuluk GSK
- Coached by: Yusuf Göktuğ Ergin

Achievements and titles
- Highest world ranking: 1 (23 May 2022)
Medal record
Men's recurve archery
Representing Turkey
| Event | 1st | 2nd | 3rd |
|---|---|---|---|
| Olympic Games | 1 | 0 | 1 |
| World Championships | 1 | 1 | 1 |
| European Championships | 2 | 1 | 3 |
| World Cup | 4 | 8 | 12 |
| Mediterranean Games | 2 | 2 | 2 |
| Islamic Solidarity Games | 1 | 1 | 1 |
| European Grand Prix | 8 | 2 | 3 |
| European Indoor Championships | 0 | 2 | 1 |
| Other | 10 | 7 | 3 |
| Total | 29 | 24 | 27 |
Olympic Games
| Gold medal – first place | 2020 Tokyo | Individual |
| Bronze medal – third place | 2024 Paris | Team |
World Championships
| Gold medal – first place | 2023 Berlin | Individual |
| Silver medal – second place | 2023 Berlin | Team |
| Bronze medal – third place | 2021 Yankton | Mixed team |
European Championships
| Gold medal – first place | 2024 Essen | Individual |
| Gold medal – first place | 2026 Antalya | Mixed team |
| Silver medal – second place | 2016 Nottingham | Individual |
| Bronze medal – third place | 2022 Munich | Individual |
| Bronze medal – third place | 2024 Essen | Team |
| Bronze medal – third place | 2026 Antalya | Individual |
European Indoor Championships
| Silver medal – second place | 2025 Samsun | Individual |
| Silver medal – second place | 2025 Samsun | Team |
| Bronze medal – third place | 2019 Samsun | Team |
World Cup
| Gold medal – first place | 2018 Berlin | Individual |
| Gold medal – first place | 2019 Berlin | Individual |
| Gold medal – first place | 2019 Berlin | Team |
| Gold medal – first place | 2026 Madrid | Individual |
| Silver medal – second place | 2018 Samsun | Mixed team |
| Silver medal – second place | 2018 Shanghai | Mixed team |
| Silver medal – second place | 2019 Shanghai | Team |
| Silver medal – second place | 2019 Shanghai | Mixed team |
| Silver medal – second place | 2025 Auburndale | Individual |
| Silver medal – second place | 2026 Puebla | Team |
| Silver medal – second place | 2026 Shanghai | Individual |
| Silver medal – second place | 2026 Shanghai | Team |
| Bronze medal – third place | 2018 Antalya | Mixed team |
| Bronze medal – third place | 2018 Berlin | Mixed team |
| Bronze medal – third place | 2019 Antalya | Individual |
| Bronze medal – third place | 2019 Antalya | Mixed team |
| Bronze medal – third place | 2021 Yankton | Individual |
| Bronze medal – third place | 2022 Paris | Team |
| Bronze medal – third place | 2022 Tlaxcala | Individual |
| Bronze medal – third place | 2023 Shanghai | Mixed team |
| Bronze medal – third place | 2025 Shanghai | Mixed team |
| Bronze medal – third place | 2026 Puebla | Individual |
| Bronze medal – third place | 2026 Puebla | Mixed team |
| Bronze medal – third place | 2026 Saltillo | Individual |
Mediterranean Games
| Gold medal – first place | 2018 Tarragona | Recurve Men |
| Gold medal – first place | 2022 Oran | Mixed team |
| Silver medal – second place | 2022 Oran | Individual |
| Silver medal – second place | 2026 Taranto | Mixed team |
| Bronze medal – third place | 2022 Oran | Team |
| Bronze medal – third place | 2026 Taranto | Team |
Islamic Solidarity Games
| Gold medal – first place | 2021 Konya | Team |
| Silver medal – second place | 2021 Konya | Mixed team |
| Bronze medal – third place | 2021 Konya | Individual |
European Grand Prix
| Gold medal – first place | 2018 Sofya | Individual |
| Gold medal – first place | 2022 Plovdiv | Mixed team |
| Gold medal – first place | 2022 Plovdiv | Team |
| Gold medal – first place | 2023 Umag | Individual |
| Gold medal – first place | 2023 Umag | Team |
| Gold medal – first place | 2024 Porec | Mixed team |
| Gold medal – first place | 2024 Porec | Team |
| Gold medal – first place | 2025 Antalya | Individual |
| Silver medal – second place | 2016 Sofya | Individual |
| Silver medal – second place | 2018 Sofya | Mixed team |
| Bronze medal – third place | 2023 Lilleshall | Individual |
| Bronze medal – third place | 2026 Antalya | Individual |
| Bronze medal – third place | 2026 Antalya | Team |
Conquest Cup
| Silver medal – second place | 2024 İstanbul | Individual |
Kahraman Bagatir Spring Arrows
| Gold medal – first place | 2023 Antalya | Individual |
| Gold medal – first place | 2023 Antalya | Mixed team |
| Gold medal – first place | 2024 Antalya | Individual |
| Silver medal – second place | 2022 Antalya | Mixed team |
| Silver medal – second place | 2023 Antalya | Team |
Veronica Cup
| Gold medal – first place | 2019 Kamnik | Individual |
| Gold medal – first place | 2019 Kamnik | Mixed team |
| Gold medal – first place | 2019 Kamnik | Team |
| Silver medal – second place | 2017 Kamnik | Team |
| Bronze medal – third place | 2017 Kamnik | Mixed team |
World Indoor Championship
| Silver medal – second place | 2016 Ankara | Junior Men team |
| Silver medal – second place | 2018 Yankton | Junior Men's individual |
World Youth Championships
| Silver medal – second place | 2013 Wuxi | Junior Men team |
| Bronze medal – third place | 2017 Rosario | Junior Mixed team |
European Youth Championships
| Gold medal – first place | 2017 Porec | Junior Men's individual |
| Gold medal – first place | 2017 Marathon | Junior Men's individual |
| Gold medal – first place | 2017 Marathon | Junior Men team |
| Gold medal – first place | 2018 Patras | Junior Men's individual |
| Bronze medal – third place | 2017 Marathon | Junior Mixed team |

Mete Gazoz (born 8 June 1999 in Istanbul) is a Turkish recurve archer. He won the gold medal in the men's individual event at the 2020 Summer Olympics held in Tokyo, Japan, and a bronze medal in the men's team event at the 2024 Summer Olympics. He also represented Turkey at the 2016 Summer Olympics held in Rio de Janeiro, Brazil. In the 2023 World Archery Championships held in Berlin, Gazoz won the men's individual recurve title, defeating Canadian archer Eric Peters and becoming the first Turkish archer to win a recurve gold medal at the World Championships.

== Sports career ==
Gazoz began Archery in 2010. The right-handed archer made his international debut in 2013.

He won the silver medal in the Recurve Junior Men Team event at the 2013 World Archery Youth Championships in Wuxi, China. He participated in the 2014 Summer Youth Olympics in Nanjing, China, in the 2015 European Games in Baku, Azerbaijan, and in the 2015 World Archery Championships in Copenhagen, Denmark. Gazoz won the silver medal in the Recurve Cadet Men event at the European Youth Cup Circuit 2015 in Klagenfurt, Austria, and another silver medal in the Recurve Junior Men Team event at the 2016 World Indoor Archery Championships in Ankara, Turkey.

Gazoz won his first match on 8 August 2016 in the 2016 Rio Olympics at 1/32 tour against the French Pierre Plihon, with a score of 6–5. At his second match, 1/16 tour, he lost the game 3–7 against the Dutch Sjef Van den Berg.

He won the bronze medal in the Junior Mixed team event with his teammate Yasemin Anagöz at the 2017 World Archery Youth Championships in Rosario, Santa Fe, Argentina.

He claimed the silver medal in the Junior Men's individual event at the 2018 World Indoor Archery Championships held in Yankton, South Dakota, United States.

He won the gold medal in individuals 70m category during the 2018 Mediterranean Games held in Tarragona, Spain.

Mete Gazoz won gold in men's individual archery at Tokyo Olympic Games, bringing his country its first-ever Olympic medal in archery. “I’m feeling great. It’s amazing to be here, it’s amazing to have a gold medal at the Olympics. After 2016, after Rio, I promised myself I would be Olympic Champion next time in Tokyo,” said Gazoz. Gazoz, who defeated Luxembourg's Jeff Henckels in the first round match held on Thursday at the Yumenoshima Archery Field, and Australian Ryan Tyack in the second round match, had advanced to the last 16. He advanced to the quarterfinals by knocking off Australian Taylor Worth in the round of 16 in the morning session. Gazoz eliminated Brady Ellison of the United States, who is ranked number 1 in the world rankings, to book his spot in the semifinals. In the semis, Gazoz defeated Japan's Takaharu Furukawa to advance to the final. Here he competed against Italy's Mauro Nespoli. Gazoz won the match 6–4 and bagged the gold medal.

He won the bronze medal in the men's individual recurve event at the 2022 European Archery Championships held in Munich, Germany.

Mete Gazoz won the gold medal at the 2023 World Archery Championships held in Berlin, Germany by defeating Canadian Eric Peters 6–4 in the men's individual classical final as a result of 28–27, 28–30, 24–28, 30–28 and 28–29 sets. He defeated El Salvadoran Óscar Ticas 7–3 in the first round, Indian Tushar Prabhakar Shelke 6–0 in the second round, Swiss Florian Faber 6–0 in the third round, American Brady Ellison 6–0 in the fourth round, Chilean Ricardo Soto 6–2 in the quarterfinals and Brazilian Marcus D'Almeida 7–3 in the semifinals to reach the final. By winning the silver medal at the 2023 World Archery Championships, the men's classical men's national team consisting of Mete Gazoz, Berkim Tümer and Muhammed Yıldırmış came second in the world. Turkey has achieved a quota for the 2024 Summer Olympics in both team and individual in men's classical men's archery.

In 2023, he was honored for the third time with the Best Men's Recurve Archer of the Year award of the World Archery Federation following in 2018 and 2021.

He won the gold medal in the men's individual recurve event at the 2024 European Archery Championships held in Essen, Germany by defeating Slovenian Den Habjan Malavašič 6–0 in the men's individual classical final match in 29–25, 26–25, 30–28 sets. Gazoz had reached the final by eliminating Luxembourg's Pit Klein 6–0, Dutch Steve Wijler 6–0, Dutch Gijs Broeksma 6–0, and French Baptiste Addis 7–1 in the semifinals. In the men's team recurve event team consisting of Mete Gazoz, Berkim Tümer and Berkay Akkoyun won the bronze medal by defeating the Netherlands 5–4 in the third place match. Gazoz became the first archer to hold the Olympic, World and European championships at the same time.

== Honours ==
World Archery Federation
Best Men's Recurve Archer of the Year (3): 2018, 2021, 2023.
