= Berkim Tümer =

Turkish archer (born 2002)

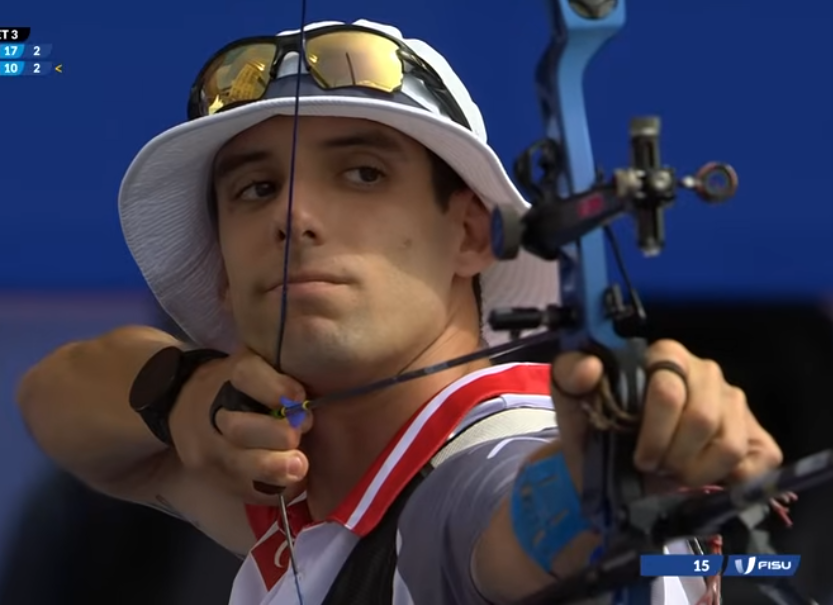
- At the 2025 World University Games

Personal information
- Full name: Ulaş Berkim Tümer
- Born: 30 April 2002 (age 24) Gelibolu, Çanakkale, Turkey
- Education: Akdeniz University

Sport
- Country: Turkey
- Sport: Archery
- Event: Recurve
- Club: İstanbul Avcılık ve Atıcılık Spor
- Coached by: Yusuf Göktuğ Ergin
Medal record
Men's recurve archery
Representing Turkey
Olympic Games
Bronze medal – third place	2024 Paris	Team
World Championships
Silver medal – second place	2023 Berlin	Team
European Championships
Bronze medal – third place	2024 Essen	Team
Summer World University Games
Bronze medal – third place	2025 Rhine-Ruhr	Individual
Bronze medal – third place	2025 Rhine-Ruhr	Team
Mediterranean Games
Bronze medal – third place	2026 Taranto	Team
European Indoor Championships
Silver medal – second place	2025 Samsun	Team
World Cup
Silver medal – second place	2026 Puebla	Team
Silver medal – second place	2026 Shanghai	Team
Bronze medal – third place	2026 Shanghai	Individual
European Grand Prix
Gold medal – first place	2023 Umag	Team
Gold medal – first place	2024 Porec	Team
Conquest Cup
Gold medal – first place	2024 İstanbul	Individual
Bronze medal – third place	2023 İstanbul	Individual

Ulaş Berkim Tümer (born 30 April 2002) is a Turkish archer competing in recurve events. He won a bronze medal at the 2024 Paris Olympics as part of the Turkish men's team.

== Early life ==
From Gelibolu, he started archery at the age of nine years-old. He went on to become the Turkish champion in the junior category.

== Career ==
In 2017, Tümer made his debut for the national team and joined the A team in 2020. He was a silver medalist at the 2023 World Archery Championships in the Men's team recurve event in Berlin. That year, they won the European Grand Prix as a team in Umag, Croatia, defeating Switzerland 5-3 in the final.

He was selected to represent Turkey at the 2024 Summer Olympics. In the men's team event he won a bronze medal on 29 July 2024, alongside Mete Gazoz and Muhammet Abdullah Yıldırmış. They were coached by Yusuf Göktuğ Ergin. In the singles competition at the games, he lost in the round of 16 against his American opponent Brady Ellison. Alongside Gazoz and Berkay Akkoyun, he was also a bronze medalist at the 2024 European Archery Championships in Essen, coming back from 4-0 down to win 5-4 in the bronze medal match against the Netherlands.

He finished in third place at the Turkish 2025 Indoor Federation Cup held in January 2025. He also won in the team competition at the event to consolidate his place on the national team. At the 2025 European Indoor Archery Championships, the men's recurve team consisting of Mete Gazoz, Berkim Tümer and Abdullah Yıldırmış won the silver medal, losing 5-4 to Italy in the final match.

At the 2025 Summer World University Games in Rhine-Ruhr, Germany, Turkish archer Ulaş Berkim Tümer won the bronze medal in the men's individual recurve event by defeating China's Hao Feng 6–4 in the bronze medal match. In addition, the Turkish men's recurve team—composed of Tümer, Berkay Akkoyun, and Abdullah Yıldırmış claimed the bronze medal in the team event by beating Chinese Taipei 6–0 in the third-place match.
