= Trenton Cowles =

American archer (born 2002)

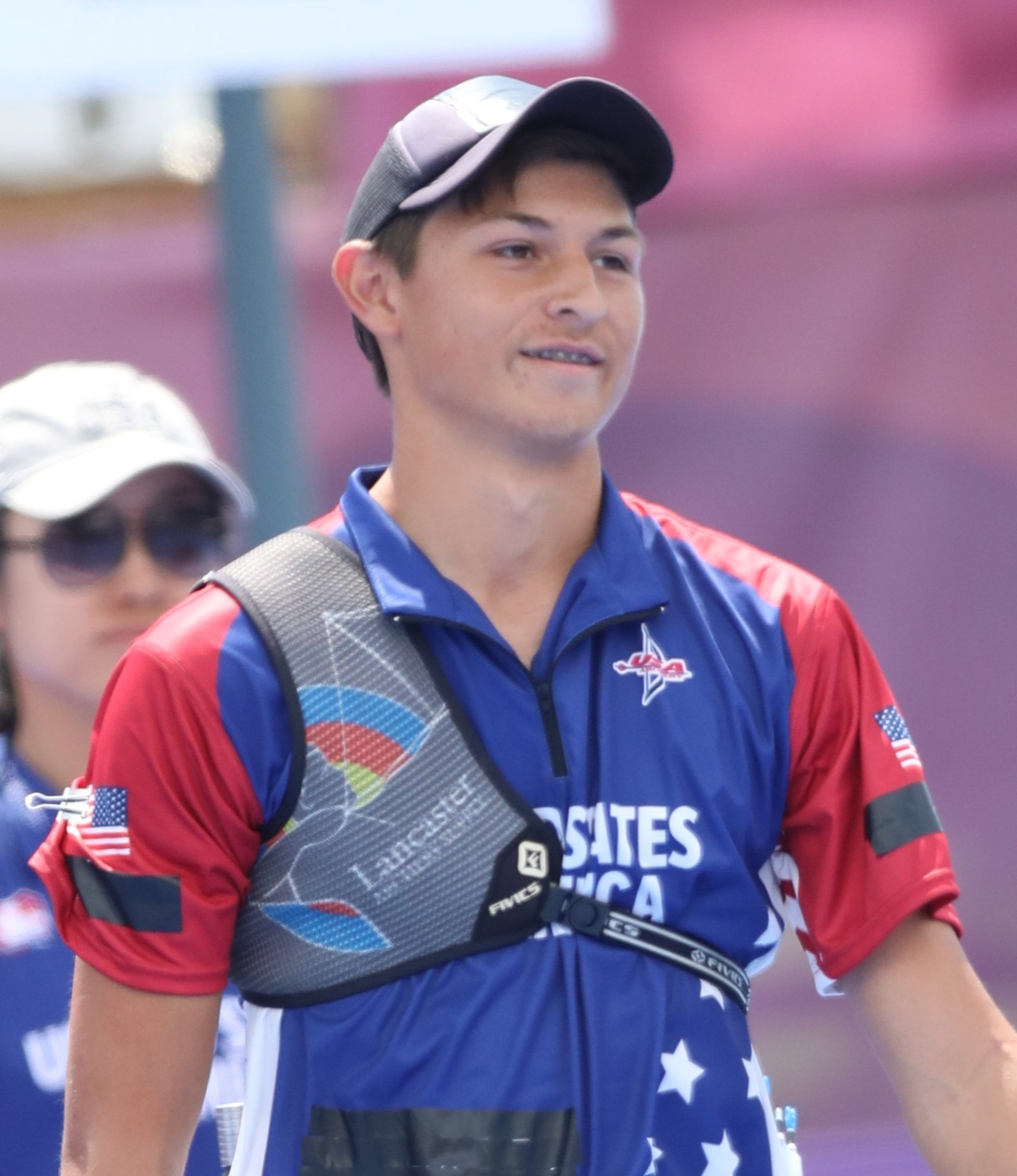
- Cowles at the 2018 Summer Youth Olympics

Personal information
- Born: May 29, 2002 (age 24)
- Home town: Tarzana, California, U.S.

Sport
- Sport: Archery
- Event: Recurve
Medal record
Men's recurve archery
Representing the United States
World Championships
| Silver medal – second place | 2025 Gwangju | Team |
World Youth Championships
| Bronze medal – third place | 2021 Wrocław | Team |
Pan American Games
| Gold medal – first place | 2023 Santiago | Team |
Junior Pan American Games
| Gold medal – first place | 2021 Cali-Valle | Individual |
| Gold medal – first place | 2021 Cali-Valle | Mixed team |
| Silver medal – second place | 2021 Cali-Valle | Team |

Trenton Cowles (born May 29, 2002) is an American archer competing in men's recurve events. He won the silver medal in the men's team recurve event at the 2025 World Archery Championships.

== Early life ==
Cowles attended Taft Charter High School in Woodland Hills, California. He first discovered archery while playing it on Wii Sports Resort.

== Career ==
Cowles made his international debut for the United States at the 2018 Summer Youth Olympics and won a gold medal in the boy's individual event and a bronze medal in the mixed team event. His gold medal was team USA's best finish in archery at a Youth Olympic Games or Olympic Games since 1996.

He competed at the 2021 Junior Pan American Games and won gold medals in the individual and mixed team events, and a silver medal in the men's team event.

In September 2025, he competed at the 2025 World Archery Championships and won a silver medal in the men's team event.

== Personal life ==
Cowles received both a B.S. and M.S. in Mechanical Engineering from Texas A&M, where he also competed on their collegiate archery team.
