= Abdullah Yıldırmış =

Turkish archer (born 2003)

Personal information
- Full name: Muhammed Abdullah Yıldırmış
- Nationality: Turkish
- Born: 7 November 2003 (age 22) Istanbul, Turkey
- Education: Akdeniz University

Sport
- Country: Turkey
- Sport: Archery
- Event: recurve
- Club: İstanbul Okçular Vakfı
- Coached by: Yusuf Göktuğ Ergin; Evrim Sağlam
Medal record
Men's recurve archery
Representing Turkey
Olympic Games
Bronze medal – third place	2024 Paris	Team
World Championships
Silver medal – second place	2023 Berlin	Team
European Indoor Championships
Silver medal – second place	2025 Samsun	Team
World Cup
Bronze medal – third place	2022 Paris	Team
Bronze medal – third place	2024 Yecheon	Individual
FISU World University Games
Bronze medal – third place	2025 Essen	Team
Mediterranean Games
Bronze medal – third place	2022 Oran	Team
Islamic Solidarity Games
Gold medal – first place	2021 Konya	Team
European Grand Prix
Gold medal – first place	2022 Plovdiv	Team
Gold medal – first place	2023 Umag	Team
Conquest Cup
Silver medal – second place	2023 İstanbul	Individual
Bronze medal – third place	2024 İstanbul	Individual

Muhammed Abdullah Yıldırmış (born 7 November 2003) is a Turkish archer competing in recurve events. He won a bronze medal at the 2024 Paris Olympics as part of the Turkish men's team.

== Sports career ==
Yıldırmış won the bronze medal with his teammates at the 2022 Mediterranean Games in Oran, Algeria.

At the 2021 Islamic Solidarity Games in Konya, Turkey, he won the gold medal in the team event.

He and his teammates took the silver medal at the 2023 World Archery Championships in Berlin, Germany.

He won the bronze medal in the individual event of the 2024 Archery World Cup's second stage in Yecheon, South Korea.

He is qualified to represent Turkey at the 2024 Summer Olympics in Paris, France.

At the 2025 European Indoor Archery Championships, the men's recurve team consisting of Mete Gazoz, Berkim Tümer and Abdullah Yıldırmış won the silver medal, losing 5–4 to Italy in the final match.

At the 2025 Summer World University Games in Rhine-Ruhr, Germany, Akkoyun competed for Turkey in the men's team recurve event. The Turkish team, composed of Berkay Akkoyun, Ulaş Berkim Tümer, and Muhammed Abdullah Yıldırmış, won the bronze medal after defeating Chinese Taipei 6–0 in the third-place match on 25 July 2025.
