= Baptiste Addis =

French archer (born 2006)

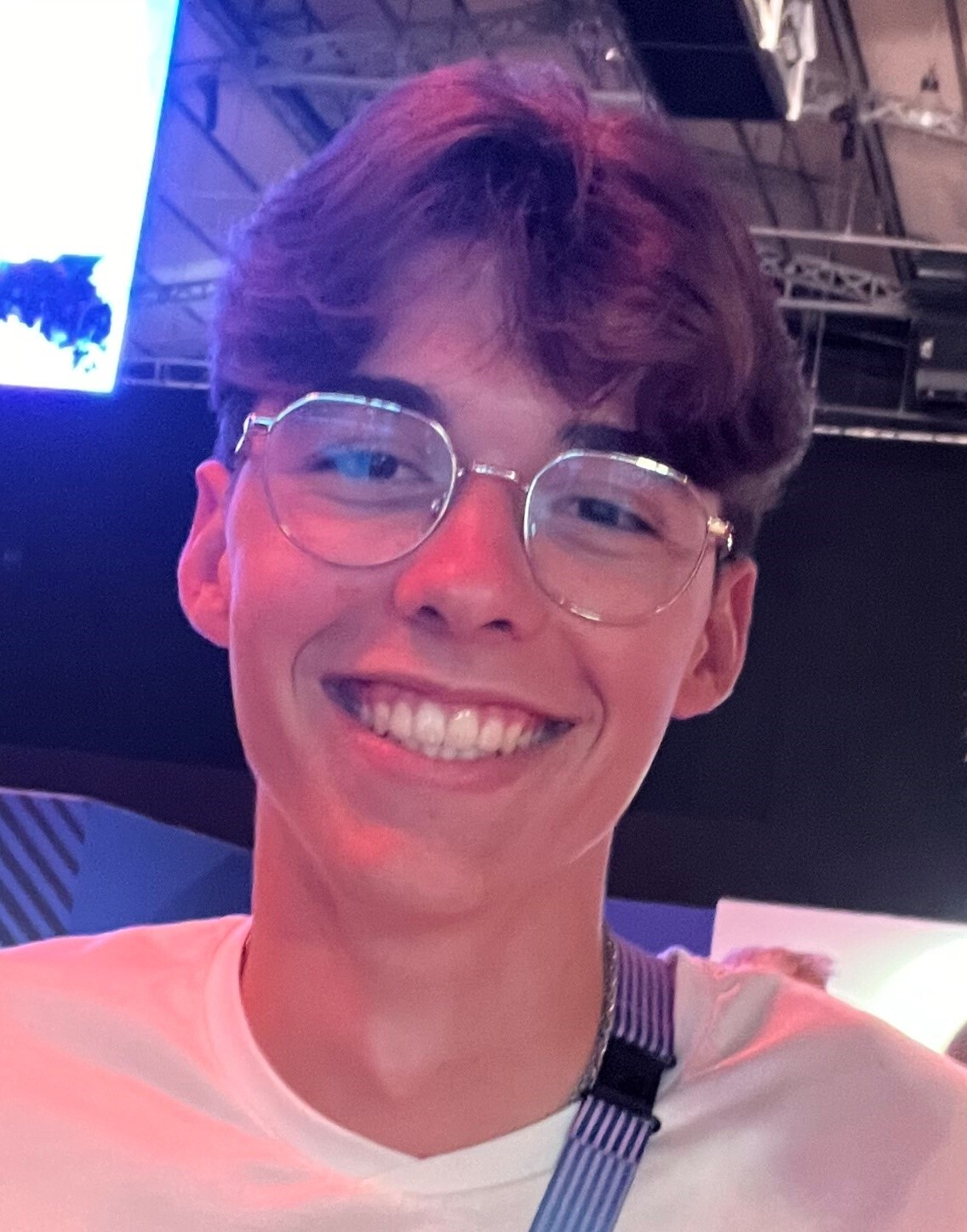
- Addis in 2024

Personal information
- Born: 7 December 2006 (age 19) Manduel, France

Sport
- Country: France
- Sport: Archery
- Club: Pôle France Relève
Medal record
Men's recurve archery
Representing France
Olympic Games
Silver medal – second place	2024 Paris	Team
European Championships
Gold medal – first place	2024 Essen	Team
Silver medal – second place	2026 Antalya	Mixed team
Bronze medal – third place	2026 Antalya	Team

Baptiste Addis (born 7 December 2006) is a French archer competing in recurve events. He won the silver medal at the Men's team event at the 2024 Summer Olympics.

== Biography ==
Addis was a part of the French team for the 2024 Summer Olympics. In the individual event, he seeded 6th and was knocked out in the quarterfinals by Florian Unruh. On 29 July 2024, he won a silver medal with France in the Team event, becoming, at 17 years old, the youngest French medalist in archery.
