= Elif Berra Gökkır =

Turkish archer (born 2007)

Elif Gökkır
Personal information
- Full name: Elif Berra Gökkır
- Nationality: Turkish
- Born: 11 January 2007 (age 19) Turkey
- Home town: Turkey

Sport
- Country: Turkey
- Sport: Archery
- Event: Recurve
Medal record
Women's Archery Recurve
Representing Turkey
World Cup
| Silver medal – second place | 2026 Puebla | Team |
| Silver medal – second place | 2026 Madrid | Individual |
| Bronze medal – third place | 2026 Puebla | Mixed team |
Mediterranean Games
| Gold medal – first place | 2026 Taranto | Team |
European Continental Qualification Tournament
| Bronze medal – third place | 2024 Essen | Individual |
European Grand Prix
| Bronze medal – third place | 2024 Poreč | Team |
U-21 European Indoor Championships
| Gold medal – first place | 2025 Samsun | Individual |
| Gold medal – first place | 2025 Samsun | Team |

Elif Berra Gökkır (born 11 January 2007) is a Turkish archer competing in the women's recurve bow event. She qualified for the 2024 Olympics in Paris, France.

== Career ==
Gökkır took the bronze medal at the 2024 European Continental Qualification Tournament held in Essen, Germany. She so qualified to represent her country at the 2024 Olympic in Paris, France.

She won the bronze medal with her teammates at the first leg of the 2024 European Grand Prix in Poreč, Croatia.
