= Wang Yan (archer) =

Chinese archer (born 2000)

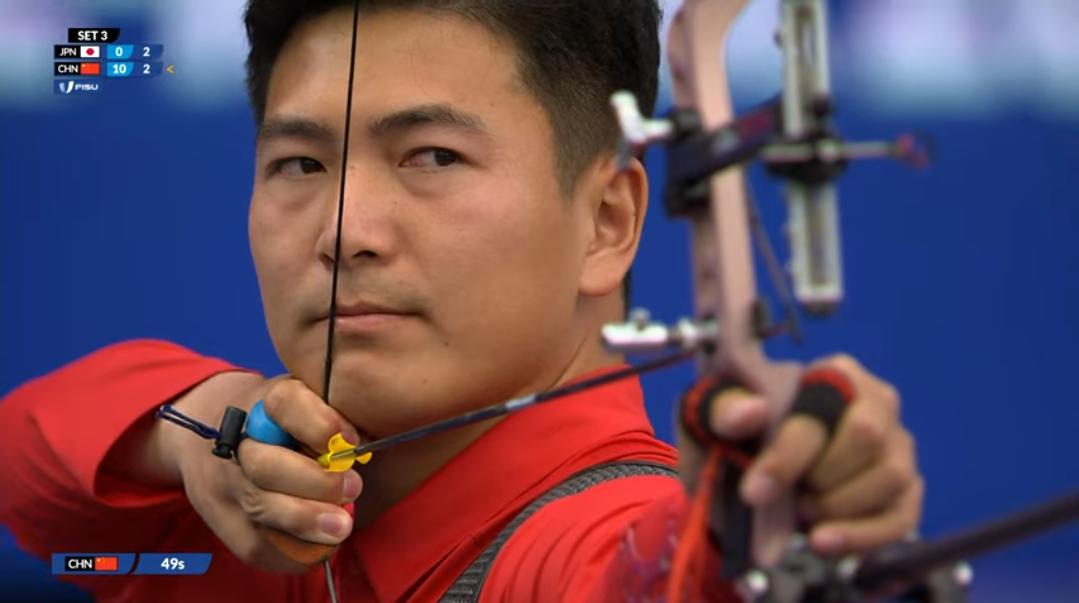
- At the 2025 Summer World University Games

Personal information
- Born: 12 February 2000 (age 26) Jiangsu, China

Sport
- Country: China
- Sport: Archery
- Event: Recurve
Medal record
Men's recurve archery
Representing China
World University Games
Gold medal – first place	2025 Rhine-Ruhr	Mixed team
Military World Games
Gold medal – first place	2019 Wuhan	Team

Wang Yan (born 12 February 2000) is a Chinese archer competing in recurve events. He competed at the 2024 Paris Olympics.

== Career ==
He competed for China at the Archery World Cup stage 3 event in Antalya in June 2024. They reached the semi finals before ultimately winning their bronze medal match.

He competed for China at the Archery at the 2024 Summer Olympics in the Men's team event. They reached the semi final with a win over Taiwan. Following that, the team had consecutive defeats to South Korea in the semi final and Turkey in the bronze medal match, to place fourth overall.
