= Thomas Chirault =

French archer (born 1997)

Personal information
- Born: 15 September 1997 (age 29) Corbie, France
- Height: 1.78 m (5 ft 10 in)
- Weight: 71 kg (157 lb)

Sport
- Country: France
- Sport: Archery
- Event: Recurve
- Club: Stade Clermontois
Medal record
Men's recurve archery
Representing France
Olympic Games
Silver medal – second place	2024 Paris	Men’s team
World Championships
Silver medal – second place	2017 Mexico City	Team
European Games
Gold medal – first place	2019 Minsk	Team
European Championships
Gold medal – first place	2024 Essen	Team
Silver medal – second place	2018 Legnica	Mixed team
Bronze medal – third place	2026 Antalya	Team
European Indoor Championships
Gold medal – first place	2022 Laško	Team
Mediterranean Games
Gold medal – first place	2026 Taranto	Individual
Gold medal – first place	2026 Taranto	Mixed team
Silver medal – second place	2026 Taranto	Team
Military World Games
Bronze medal – third place	2019 Wuhan	Mixed team

Thomas Chirault (born 15 September 1997) is a French archer competing in men's recurve events. He won the silver medal in the men’s team event at the 2024 Summer Olympics.

== Career ==
He won a silver medal in the men's team event at the 2017 World Archery Championships held in Mexico City, Mexico.

At the 2018 European Archery Championships in Legnica, Poland, he won the silver medal in the mixed team recurve event.

In 2021, Chirault represented France at the 2020 Summer Olympics in Tokyo, Japan.

Chirault won the gold medal in the men's team recurve event at the 2022 European Indoor Archery Championships held in Laško, Slovenia.

Thomas Chirault won his first major international medal in 2017 when he took the team gold medal at the 4th World Cup round in Berlin. Later that same year, he became the world team silver medalist alongside Jean-Charles Valladont and Pierre Plihon.
