= Berkay Akkoyun =

Turkish recurve archer

Personal information
- Born: Antalya, Turkey

Sport
- Country: Turkey
- Sport: Archery
- Event: recurve
Medal record
Men's recurve archery
Representing Turkey
European Championships
Bronze medal – third place	2024 Essen	Team
European Games
Bronze medal – third place	2023 Kraków	Team
World Cup
Silver medal – second place	2026 Puebla	Team
Silver medal – second place	2026 Shanghai	Team
FISU World University Games
Bronze medal – third place	2025 Essen	Team
Mediterranean Games
Bronze medal – third place	2026 Taranto	Team
World Youth Championships
Silver medal – second place	2021 Wrocław	Junior Team

Berkay Akkoyun is a Turkish recurve archer. He competed at the 2024 European Archery Championships, winning the bronze medal in the team recurve event.
