= Great Britain at the 2024 Summer Olympics =

- Flag of the United Kingdom
- IOC code: GBR
- NOC: British Olympic Association
- Website: www.teamgb.com

in Paris, France 26 July 2024 – 11 August 2024
- Competitors: 327 (153 men and 174 women) in 26 sports
- Flag bearers (opening): Tom Daley and Helen Glover
- Flag bearers (closing): Bryony Page and Alex Yee
- Officials: Mark England (Chef de Mission)
- Medals Ranked 7th: Gold 14 Silver 22 Bronze 29 Total 65

Summer Olympics appearances (overview)
- 1896; 1900; 1904; 1908; 1912; 1920; 1924; 1928; 1932; 1936; 1948; 1952; 1956; 1960; 1964; 1968; 1972; 1976; 1980; 1984; 1988; 1992; 1996; 2000; 2004; 2008; 2012; 2016; 2020; 2024; 2028

Other related appearances
- 1906 Intercalated Games

Great Britain (known as Team GB or the 'Great Britain and Northern Ireland Olympic Team'), the team of the British Olympic Association (BOA) which represents the United Kingdom, competed at the 2024 Summer Olympics in Paris from 26 July to 11 August 2024. The delegation of 327 athletes included 172 women and 155 men and featured 73 medallists from previous Games. The team was made up of athletes from the whole United Kingdom including Northern Ireland (whose people may elect to hold Irish citizenship and are able to be selected to represent either Great Britain or Ireland at the Olympics).

British athletes have appeared in every Summer Olympic Games of the modern era, alongside Australia, France, Greece, and Switzerland, although Great Britain is the only team to have won at least one gold medal at all of them. This streak was maintained in Paris when Ros Canter, Laura Collett and Tom McEwen won gold in the Equestrian Team eventing competition on day three of the Games. The first medal for the team was won on the first morning at the diving centre, where Yasmin Harper and Scarlett Mew Jensen won bronze in the women's synchronised 3 metre springboard, the first 'synchro' medal ever won by British women at the Olympics, and one of five diving medals won by the team.

During the Games the British team won its first ever Olympic medals in sport climbing, with Toby Roberts' gold in the men's combined, and in artistic swimming, with Kate Shortman and Isabelle Thorpe taking silver in the women's duet. Track cyclist Emma Finucane became the first British female athlete to win three medals at the same Games since Mary Rand in Tokyo in 1964.

Rowing, by gold medals (three), and cycling, by overall medals (11), were the most successful disciplines for Team GB in Paris. Great Britain won three medals in three events in triathlon, including one gold, and five medals, including two golds, from six equestrian events, with every member of the equestrian team, and all but one member of the triathlon team bringing home a medal. British athletes won medals in all four velodrome team events, all five athletics stadium relays, all four synchronised diving events, all three equestrian team events, eight rowing boats, the mixed triathlon relay and a unique second successive gold in the men's 4 × 200 metres freestyle relay for the same four swimmers who had previously won gold in Tokyo, a feat never achieved previously by any nation in a swimming event.

A number of previous British Olympic champions ended their competitive career in Paris: Tom Daley announced his retirement after winning a British record fifth diving medal in five games in the men's 10 metre synchronised platform, a silver with Noah Williams, who himself later became only the third male British diver to win an individual platform medal; Andy Murray withdrew from the tennis singles but reached the quarter-finals in the men's doubles with Dan Evans in his final tournament; and six-time Olympic medallist Max Whitlock finished fourth in both the men's team and the individual pommel horse finals in his fourth and final Olympic Games.

65 medals were won, the third most overall medals won by any nation in the Games after the United States and China, beating the amount won in Tokyo 2020 and the lower target of 50 set by UK Sport. However only 14 gold medals were won, the lowest amount since Athens 2004, leading to a final ranking of 7th in the medal table.

== Medallists ==
Medal	Name	Sport	Event	Date
Gold	Ros Canter; Laura Collett; Tom McEwen	Equestrian	Team eventing	29 July
Gold	Tom Pidcock	Cycling	Men's cross-country	29 July
Gold	Nathan Hales	Shooting	Men's trap	30 July
Gold	Matt Richards; Duncan Scott; Tom Dean; James Guy; Kieran Bird; Jack McMillan	Swimming	Men's 4 × 200 m freestyle relay	30 July
Gold	Alex Yee	Triathlon	Men's triathlon	31 July
Gold	Lauren Henry; Hannah Scott; Lola Anderson; Georgie Brayshaw	Rowing	Women's quadruple sculls	31 July
Gold	Emily Craig; Imogen Grant	Rowing	Women's lightweight double sculls	2 August
Gold	Bryony Page	Gymnastics	Women's trampoline	2 August
Gold	Scott Brash; Ben Maher; Harry Charles	Equestrian	Team jumping	2 August
Gold	Sholto Carnegie; Rory Gibbs; Morgan Bolding; Jacob Dawson; Charlie Elwes; Tom Digby; James Rudkin; Tom Ford; Harry Brightmore (cox)	Rowing	Men's eight	3 August
Gold	Sophie Capewell; Emma Finucane; Katy Marchant	Cycling	Women's team sprint	5 August
Gold	Keely Hodgkinson	Athletics	Women's 800 m	5 August
Gold	Ellie Aldridge	Sailing	Women's kite	8 August
Gold	Toby Roberts	Sport climbing	Men's combined	9 August
Silver	Anna Henderson	Cycling	Women's road time trial	27 July
Silver	Adam Peaty	Swimming	Men's 100 m breaststroke	28 July
Silver	Tom Daley; Noah Williams	Diving	Men's synchronized 10 m platform	29 July
Silver	Adam Burgess	Canoeing	Men's slalom C-1	29 July
Silver	Matt Richards	Swimming	Men's 200 m freestyle	29 July
Silver	Kieran Reilly	Cycling	Men's BMX freestyle	31 July
Silver	Helen Glover; Esme Booth; Sam Redgrave; Rebecca Shorten	Rowing	Women's four	1 August
Silver	Ollie Wynne-Griffith; Tom George	Rowing	Men's pair	2 August
Silver	Ben Proud	Swimming	Men's 50 m freestyle	2 August
Silver	Duncan Scott	Swimming	Men's 200 m individual medley	2 August
Silver	Amber Rutter	Shooting	Women's skeet	4 August
Silver	Tommy Fleetwood	Golf	Men's individual	4 August
Silver	Joe Clarke	Canoeing	Men's KX-1	5 August
Silver	Jack Carlin; Ed Lowe; Hamish Turnbull	Cycling	Men's team sprint	6 August
Silver	Josh Kerr	Athletics	Men's 1500 m	6 August
Silver	Matthew Hudson-Smith	Athletics	Men's 400 m	7 August
Silver	Ethan Hayter; Daniel Bigham; Ethan Vernon; Charlie Tanfield; Oliver Wood	Cycling	Men's team pursuit	7 August
Silver	Elinor Barker; Neah Evans	Cycling	Women's madison	9 August
Silver	Dina Asher-Smith; Desirèe Henry (h); Amy Hunt; Imani-Lara Lansiquot; Daryll Neita; Bianca Williams (h)	Athletics	Women's 4 × 100 m relay	9 August
Silver	Katarina Johnson-Thompson	Athletics	Women's heptathlon	9 August
Silver	Kate Shortman; Isabelle Thorpe	Artistic swimming	Women's duet	10 August
Silver	Caden Cunningham	Taekwondo	Men's +80 kg	10 August
Bronze	Yasmin Harper; Scarlett Mew Jensen	Diving	Women's 3 m synchronized springboard	27 July
Bronze	Kimberley Woods	Canoeing	Women's slalom K-1	28 July
Bronze	Laura Collett	Equestrian	Individual eventing	29 July
Bronze	Beth Potter	Triathlon	Women's triathlon	31 July
Bronze	Andrea Spendolini-Sirieix; Lois Toulson	Diving	Women's 10 m synchronized platform	31 July
Bronze	Becky Wilde; Mathilda Hodgkins-Byrne	Rowing	Women's double sculls	1 August
Bronze	Oli Wilkes; David Ambler; Matt Aldridge; Freddie Davidson	Rowing	Men's four	1 August
Bronze	Anthony Harding; Jack Laugher	Diving	Men's 3 m synchronized springboard	2 August
Bronze	Heidi Long; Rowan McKellar; Holly Dunford; Emily Ford; Lauren Irwin; Eve Stewart; Hattie Taylor; Annie Campbell-Orde; Henry Fieldman (cox)	Rowing	Women's eight	3 August
Bronze	Emma Wilson	Sailing	Women's iQFoil	3 August
Bronze	Lottie Fry; Carl Hester; Becky Moody	Equestrian	Team dressage	3 August
Bronze	Jake Jarman	Gymnastics	Men's floor	3 August
Bronze	Sam Reardon; Laviai Nielsen; Alex Haydock-Wilson; Amber Anning; Nicole Yeargin (h)	Athletics	Mixed 4 x 400 m relay	3 August
Bronze	Lottie Fry	Equestrian	Individual dressage	4 August
Bronze	Harry Hepworth	Gymnastics	Men's vault	4 August
Bronze	Alex Yee; Georgia Taylor-Brown; Sam Dickinson; Beth Potter	Triathlon	Mixed relay triathlon	5 August
Bronze	Kimberley Woods	Canoeing	Women's KX-1	5 August
Bronze	Sky Brown	Skateboarding	Women's park	6 August
Bronze	Lewis Richardson	Boxing	Men's welterweight	6 August
Bronze	Elinor Barker; Josie Knight; Anna Morris; Jessica Roberts	Cycling	Women's team pursuit	7 August
Bronze	Emma Finucane	Cycling	Women's keirin	8 August
Bronze	Jeremiah Azu; Louie Hinchliffe; Zharnel Hughes; Richard Kilty (h); Nethaneel Mitchell-Blake	Athletics	Men's 4 × 100 m relay	9 August
Bronze	Jack Carlin	Cycling	Men's sprint	9 August
Bronze	Noah Williams	Diving	Men's 10 m platform	10 August
Bronze	Georgia Bell	Athletics	Women's 1500 m	10 August
Bronze	Lewis Davey; Charlie Dobson; Toby Harries (h); Alex Haydock-Wilson; Matthew Hudson-Smith; Sam Reardon (h)	Athletics	Men's 4 × 400m relay	10 August
Bronze	Amber Anning; Yemi Mary John (h); Hannah Kelly (h); Laviai Nielsen; Lina Nielsen (h); Victoria Ohuruogu; Jodie Williams (h); Nicole Yeargin	Athletics	Women's 4 × 400m relay	10 August
Bronze	Emma Finucane	Cycling	Women's sprint	11 August
Bronze	Emily Campbell	Weightlifting	Women's +81 kg	11 August

Medals by sport
Sport	1st place, gold medalist(s)	2nd place, silver medalist(s)	3rd place, bronze medalist(s)	Total
Rowing	3	2	3	8
Cycling	2	5	4	11
Equestrian	2	0	3	5
Athletics	1	4	5	10
Swimming	1	4	0	5
Shooting	1	1	0	2
Gymnastics	1	0	2	3
Triathlon	1	0	2	3
Sailing	1	0	1	2
Sport climbing	1	0	0	1
Canoeing	0	2	2	4
Diving	0	1	4	5
Artistic swimming	0	1	0	1
Golf	0	1	0	1
Taekwondo	0	1	0	1
Boxing	0	0	1	1
Skateboarding	0	0	1	1
Weightlifting	0	0	1	1
Total	14	22	29	65

Medals by Date
Day	Date	1st place, gold medalist(s)	2nd place, silver medalist(s)	3rd place, bronze medalist(s)	Total
1	27 July	0	1	1	2
2	28 July	0	1	1	2
3	29 July	2	3	1	6
4	30 July	2	0	0	2
5	31 July	2	1	2	5
6	1 August	0	1	2	3
7	2 August	3	3	1	7
8	3 August	1	0	5	6
9	4 August	0	2	2	4
10	5 August	2	1	2	5
11	6 August	0	2	2	4
12	7 August	0	2	1	3
13	8 August	1	0	1	2
14	9 August	1	3	2	6
15	10 August	0	2	4	6
16	11 August	0	0	2	2
Total		14	22	29	65

Medals by gender
Gender	1st place, gold medalist(s)	2nd place, silver medalist(s)	3rd place, bronze medalist(s)	Total
Male	7	15	9	31
Female	6	7	17	30
Mixed	1	0	3	4
Total	14	22	29	65

Multiple medallists
Name	Sport	1st place, gold medalist(s)	2nd place, silver medalist(s)	3rd place, bronze medalist(s)	Total
Emma Finucane	Cycling	1	0	2	3
Matt Richards	Swimming	1	1	0	2
Duncan Scott	Swimming	1	1	0	2
Laura Collett	Equestrian	1	0	1	2
Alex Yee	Triathlon	1	0	1	2
Elinor Barker	Cycling	0	1	1	2
Jack Carlin	Cycling	0	1	1	2
Matthew Hudson-Smith	Athletics	0	1	1	2
Noah Williams	Diving	0	1	1	2
Amber Anning	Athletics	0	0	2	2
Lottie Fry	Equestrian	0	0	2	2
Alex Haydock-Wilson	Athletics	0	0	2	2
Laviai Nielsen	Athletics	0	0	2	2
Beth Potter	Triathlon	0	0	2	2
Samuel Reardon	Athletics	0	0	2	2
Kimberley Woods	Canoeing	0	0	2	2
Nicole Yeargin	Athletics	0	0	2	2

== Administration ==
On 17 March 2022, the British Olympic Association announced that Mark England would be the team's chef de mission in Paris, following his success in the role at the two previous Games in Rio de Janeiro and Tokyo, where Great Britain won 67 and 64 medals respectively.

== Medal targets ==
UK Sport, the organisation responsible for investing money sourced from the National Lottery and the government into Olympic and Paralympic sport in the United Kingdom, set the team a target of winning between 50 and 70 medals in Paris.

Team GB medal target
Event	Medal target	2012 medals	2016 medals	2020 medals	Medals won	Target met
Overall	50–70	65	67	64	65	check

== Competitors ==
Sport	Men	Women	Total
Archery	3	3	6
Artistic swimming	0	2	2
Athletics	29	34	63
Badminton	2	1	3
Boxing	3	3	6
Canoeing	2	2	4
Cycling	15	15	30
Diving	6	5	11
Equestrian	4	5	9
Field hockey	16	16	32
Golf	2	2	4
Gymnastics	6	7	13
Judo	0	5	5
Modern pentathlon	2	2	4
Rowing	20	22	42
Rugby sevens	0	12	12
Sailing	7	7	14
Shooting	3	3	6
Skateboarding	1	2	3
Sport climbing	2	2	4
Swimming	19	14	33
Table tennis	1	1	2
Taekwondo	2	2	4
Tennis	6	2	8
Triathlon	2	3	5
Weightlifting	0	1	1
Total	153	174	327

== Archery ==
Penny Healey gained a quota for Great Britain by winning the gold medal in the women's individual recurve at the 2023 European Games in Kraków, Poland. The individual quota was returned when the British women's team won the bronze medal, and with it qualification for a full women's team, at the 2024 Final Team Qualification Tournament in Antalya, Turkey. The men's team matched this performance at the same event. The squad of six archers was announced on 1 July 2024.

Men

Athlete	Event	Ranking round		Round of 64	Round of 32	Round of 16	Quarterfinals	Semifinals	Final / BM	
Athlete	Event	Score	Seed	Opposition Score	Opposition Score	Opposition Score	Opposition Score	Opposition Score	Opposition Score	Rank
Conor Hall	Men's individual	652	46	Valladont (FRA); W 6–4	T Hall (GBR); L 5–6	Did not advance				
Tom Hall	Men's individual	645	51	Rai (IND); W 6–4	C Hall (GBR); W 6–5	Unruh (GER); L 3–7	Did not advance			
Alex Wise	Men's individual	664	27	Li (CHN); W 6–4	Addis (FRA); L 3–7	Did not advance				
Conor Hall; Tom Hall; Alex Wise	Men's team	1961	12	—N/a		Chinese Taipei; L 0–6	Did not advance			

Women

Athlete	Event	Ranking round		Round of 64	Round of 32	Round of 16	Quarterfinals	Semifinals	Final / BM	
Athlete	Event	Score	Seed	Opposition Score	Opposition Score	Opposition Score	Opposition Score	Opposition Score	Opposition Score	Rank
Megan Havers	Women's individual	635	49	Canales (ESP); W 6–0	Cordeau (FRA); W 6–5	Lim (KOR); L 1–7	Did not advance			
Penny Healey	Women's individual	631	52	Jeon (KOR); L 2–6	Did not advance					
Bryony Pitman	Women's individual	646	41	Ruiz (MEX); W 6–2	Li (CHN); L 0–6	Did not advance				
Megan Havers; Penny Healey; Bryony Pitman	Women's team	1912	11	—N/a		Germany; L 0–6	Did not advance			

Mixed

Athlete	Event	Ranking round		Round of 32	Round of 16	Quarterfinals	Semifinals	Final / BM	
Athlete	Event	Score	Seed	Opposition Score	Opposition Score	Opposition Score	Opposition Score	Opposition Score	Rank
Alex Wise; Bryony Pitman	Mixed team	1310	19	—N/a	Did not advance				19

== Artistic swimming ==
Great Britain qualified two athletes to the artistic swimming duet competition as a result of finishing top of the eligible teams on combined scores from the Duet Technical and Duet Free events at the 2024 World Championships in Doha. Kate Shortman and Isabelle Thorpe were named as the duo for the Olympics on 14 May 2024.

Shortman and Thorpe were in fourth place after their Big Ben-themed technical round performance, 0.7 points outside of a medal position. In the free routine the British pairing's Rising Phoenix routine scored 294.5085, highest in the round, giving them a combined total of 558.5367, second overall and winning a silver medal, Britain's first ever Olympic medal in the sport.

Athlete	Event	Technical routine		Free routine		Overall	
Athlete	Event	Points	Rank	Points	Rank	Total	Rank
Kate Shortman; Isabelle Thorpe	Duet	264.0282	4	294.5085	1	558.5367	2nd place, silver medalist(s)

== Athletics ==
British track and field athletes achieved the entry standards for Paris 2024, either by passing the direct qualifying mark (or time for track and road races) or by world ranking, in the following events (a maximum of 3 athletes each): The selection policy of UK Athletics is that to accept a world ranking invite, the athlete must meet either the qualification standard itself, or in certain cases a slightly lower UK Athletics standard. In addition, all individual medallists from the 2023 World Athletics Championships will be guaranteed selection if they have the required standard as the selector's discretionary picks. As a result, not all eligible athletes will necessarily be selected to travel to Paris. Great Britain won quotas in all five relays at the 2024 World Athletics Relays in May 2024. The team was announced on 5 July 2024. On 29 July Charlie Carvell withdrew from the 4x400 metres relay squad due to a hamstring injury and was replaced by Sam Reardon. On 1 August Jake Wightman was forced to pull out of the Games due to a hamstring injury sustained during training and he was replaced by Elliot Giles. On 4 August Charlotte Purdue withdrew from the marathon due to an ankle injury and was replaced by Clara Evans.

Great Britain won 10 athletics medals in Paris which was the highest number since the partially boycotted 1984 Los Angeles Olympics. In addition they set new national records in eight events, two of which were also European records. They were the only nation to reach the podium of every relay event (a silver and four bronze medals), and three of the four individual middle distance events (a gold, silver and bronze). The highest achiever was Keely Hodgkinson who finally broke her silver streak with gold in the women's 800, while other gold medal hopefuls, Josh Kerr in the men's 1500 metres, Matthew Hudson-Smith in the men's 400 metres and Katarina Johnson-Thompson in the heptathlon all picked up silver medals, narrowly missing out on gold. Emile Cairess, Daryll Neita and Dina Asher-Smith narrowly missed out on individual medals with fourth place finishes, although the latter two enjoyed a silver medal in the women's 4 x 100 metre relay.

Key

- Note–Ranks given for track events are within the athlete's heat only
- Q = Qualified for the next round
- q = Qualified for the next round as a fastest loser or, in field events, by position without achieving the qualifying target
- qR = Advanced to the next round by Referee
- R = Qualified for the Repechage
- NR = National record
- N/A = Round not applicable
- Bye = Not required to compete in given round

Track and road events
Men

Athlete	Event	Heat		Repechage		Semifinal		Final	
Athlete	Event	Result	Rank	Result	Rank	Result	Rank	Result	Rank
Jeremiah Azu	100 m	DSQ	—	—N/a		Did not advance			
Louie Hinchliffe	100 m	9.98	1 Q	—N/a		9.97	3	Did not advance	
Zharnel Hughes	100 m	10.03	3 Q	—N/a		10.01	6	Did not advance	
Zharnel Hughes	200 m	DNS	—	Did not advance					
Charlie Dobson	400 m	44.96	1 Q	Bye		44.48	4	Did not advance	
Matthew Hudson-Smith	400 m	44.78	1 Q	Bye		44.07	1 Q	43.44 AR	2nd place, silver medalist(s)
Max Burgin	800 m	1:45.36	3 Q	Bye		1:43.50	3 q	1:43.84	8
Elliot Giles	800 m	1:45.93	2 Q	Bye		1:45.46	5	Did not advance	
Ben Pattison	800 m	1:45.56	1 Q	Bye		1:45.57	4	Did not advance	
Neil Gourley	1500 m	3:37.18	5 Q	Bye		3:32.11	3 Q	3:30.88	10
Josh Kerr	1500 m	3:35.83	1 Q	Bye		3:32.46	2 Q	3:27.79 NR	2nd place, silver medalist(s)
George Mills	1500 m	3:35.99	10 R	3:33.56	3 Q	3:37.12	11	Did not advance	
Sam Atkin	5000 m	14:02.46	18	—N/a				Did not advance	
Patrick Dever	5000 m	14:13.48	13	—N/a				Did not advance	
George Mills	5000 m	14:37.34	18 qR	—N/a				13:32.32	21
Tade Ojora	110 m hurdles	13.35	4 q	Bye		13.47	7	Did not advance	
Alastair Chalmers	400 m hurdles	48.98	3 Q	Bye		56.52	8	Did not advance	
Jeremiah Azu; Louie Hinchliffe; Zharnel Hughes; Richard Kilty (heat); Nethaneel Mitchell-Blake	4 × 100m relay	38.04	3 Q	—N/a				37.61	3rd place, bronze medalist(s)
Lewis Davey; Charlie Dobson; Toby Harries (heat); Alex Haydock-Wilson; Matthew Hudson-Smith; Sam Reardon (heat)	4 × 400m relay	2:58.88	2 Q	—N/a				2:55.83 AR	3rd place, bronze medalist(s)
Emile Cairess	Marathon	—N/a						2:07:29	4
Mahamed Mahamed	Marathon	—N/a						2:15:19	57
Philip Sesemann	Marathon	—N/a						2:13:08	46
Callum Wilkinson	Men's 20 km walk	—N/a						1:20:31	16

Women

Athlete	Event	Heat		Repechage		Semifinal		Final	
Athlete	Event	Result	Rank	Result	Rank	Result	Rank	Result	Rank
Dina Asher-Smith	100 m	11.01	2 Q	—N/a		11.10	5	Did not advance	
Imani-Lara Lansiquot	100 m	11.10	3 Q	—N/a		11.21	5	Did not advance	
Daryll Neita	100 m	10.92	1 Q	—N/a		10.97	2 Q	10.96	4
Dina Asher-Smith	200 m	22.28	2 Q	Bye		22.31	2 Q	22.22	4
Daryll Neita	200 m	22.39	1 Q	Bye		22.24	2 Q	22.23	5
Bianca Williams	200 m	22.77	3 Q	Bye		22.58	4	Did not advance	
Amber Anning	400 m	49.68	1 Q	Bye		49.47	2 Q	49.29 NR	5
Laviai Nielsen	400 m	50.36	2 Q	Bye		50.69	3	Did not advance	
Victoria Ohuruogu	400 m	50.93	4 R	50.59	1 Q	51.14	5	Did not advance	
Phoebe Gill	800 m	1:58.83	3 Q	Bye		1:58.47	4	Did not advance	
Keely Hodgkinson	800 m	1:59.31	1 Q	Bye		1:56.86	1 Q	1:56.72	1st place, gold medalist(s)
Jemma Reekie	800 m	2:00.00	1 Q	Bye		1:58.01	5	Did not advance	
Georgia Bell	1500 m	4:00.29	2 Q	Bye		3:59.49	2 Q	3:52.61 NR	3rd place, bronze medalist(s)
Laura Muir	1500 m	3:58.91	2 Q	Bye		3:59.83	4 Q	3:53.37	5
Revée Walcott-Nolan	1500 m	4:06.44	8 R	4:06.73	2 Q	3:58.08	9	Did not advance	
Megan Keith	10000 m	—N/a						33:19.92	23
Eilish McColgan	10000 m	—N/a						31:20.51	15
Cindy Sember	100 m hurdles	12.72	2 Q	Bye		DNF	—	Did not advance	
Jessie Knight	400 m hurdles	55.39	5 R	55.10	2 Q	54.90	6	Did not advance	
Lina Nielsen	400 m hurdles	54.65	2 Q	Bye		1:22.23 (Note: Nielsen fell in the home straight. After a short delay, she completed the race.)	8	Did not advance	
Lizzie Bird	3000 m steeplechase	9:16.46	4 Q	—N/a				9:04.35 NR	7
Aimee Pratt	3000 m steeplechase	9:27.26	11	—N/a				Did not advance	
Dina Asher-Smith; Desirèe Henry (heat); Amy Hunt; Imani-Lara Lansiquot; Daryll Neita; Bianca Williams (heat)	4 × 100m relay	42.03	1 Q	—N/a				41.85	2nd place, silver medalist(s)
Amber Anning; Yemi Mary John (heat); Hannah Kelly (heat); Laviai Nielsen; Lina Nielsen (heat); Victoria Ohuruogu; Jodie Williams (heat); Nicole Yeargin	4 × 400m relay	3:24.72 SB	2 Q	—N/a				3:19.72 NR	3rd place, bronze medalist(s)
Clara Evans	Marathon	—N/a						2:33:01	46
Rose Harvey	Marathon	—N/a						2:51:03	78
Calli Hauger-Thackery	Marathon	—N/a						DNF	–

Mixed

Athlete	Event	Heat		Final	
Athlete	Event	Result	Rank	Result	Rank
Sam Reardon; Laviai Nielsen; Alex Haydock-Wilson; Amber Anning; Nicole Yeargin (heat)	4 × 400 m relay	3:10.61	1 Q	3:08.01	(bronze) NR

Field events

Men

Athlete	Event	Qualification		Final	
Athlete	Event	Result	Rank	Result	Rank
Jacob Fincham-Dukes	Long jump	7.96	8 q	8.14	5
Scott Lincoln	Shot put	19.69	21	Did not advance	
Lawrence Okoye	Discus throw	61.17	24	Did not advance	
Nick Percy	Discus throw	61.81	20	Did not advance	

Women

Athlete	Event	Qualification		Final	
Athlete	Event	Result	Rank	Result	Rank
Morgan Lake	High jump	1.88	15	Did not advance	
Holly Bradshaw	Pole vault	4.20	29	Did not advance	
Molly Caudery	Pole vault	NM	—	Did not advance	

Combined events – Women's heptathlon

Athlete	Event	100H	HJ	SP	200 m	LJ	JT	800 m	Final	Rank
Katarina Johnson-Thompson	Result	13.40	1.92	14.44	23.44	6.40	45.49	2:04.90	6844	2nd place, silver medalist(s)
Katarina Johnson-Thompson	Points	1065	1132	823	1035	975	773	1041	6844	2nd place, silver medalist(s)
Jade O'Dowda	Result	13.53	1.80	13.10	24.97	6.33	44.05	2:12.12	6280	10
Jade O'Dowda	Points	1046	978	734	890	953	745	934	6280	10

== Badminton ==
Great Britain entered three badminton players into the Olympic tournament based on the BWF Race to Paris Rankings.

Athlete	Event	Group stage				Elimination	Quarter-final	Semi-final	Final / BM	
Athlete	Event	Opposition Score	Opposition Score	Opposition Score	Rank	Opposition Score	Opposition Score	Opposition Score	Opposition Score	Rank
Ben Lane; Sean Vendy	Men's doubles	Chia / Yik (MAS); L (21–19, 16–21, 11–21)	Liang / Wang (CHN); L (18–21, 21–13, 14–21)	Dong / Yakura (CAN); W (21–14, 21–12)	3	—N/a	Did not advance			
Kirsty Gilmour	Women's singles	Az Zahra (AZE); W (21–13, 21–11)	He (CHN); L (22–24, 8–21)	—N/a	2	Did not advance				

== Boxing ==
Great Britain qualified six boxers into the Olympic tournament. Tokyo 2020 Olympian Charley Davison (women's bantamweight), along with rookies Delicious Orie (men's super heavyweight) and Rosie Eccles (women's welterweight), secured the spots in their respective weight divisions, either by advancing to the semifinal match or finishing in the top two, at the 2023 European Games in Nowy Targ, Poland. A fourth and fifth boxer, Patrick Brown, and Chantelle Reid won a quota at men's heavyweight and women's middleweight respectively at the 2024 World Olympic Qualification Tournament 1 in Busto Arsizio, Italy. They were joined by Lewis Richardson at men's light-middleweight from the 2024 World Olympic Qualification Tournament 2.

A further boxer fighting from the GB Boxing stable, and sparring partner of Reid, Cameroonian-born Cindy Ngamba, also qualified at women's middleweight, but was representing the Olympic Refugee Team as she did not have a British passport, although she had lived in the United Kingdom since she was 10, had been a British champion on several occasions and trained as part of the GB squad. Ngamba was actively seeking British citizenship but because Reid had already qualified in the same weight division she would have represented the Refugee Olympic Team at the Games regardless of whether she had been granted a UK passport before then, thus becoming the first boxer from the Refugee team.

Athlete	Event	Round of 32	Round of 16	Quarterfinals	Semifinals	Final	
Athlete	Event	Opposition Result	Opposition Result	Opposition Result	Opposition Result	Opposition Result	Rank
Lewis Richardson	Men's 71 kg	Bye	Abasov (SRB); W 3–2	Ishaish (JOR); W 3–2	Verde (MEX); L 2–3	Did not advance	3rd place, bronze medalist(s)
Patrick Brown	Men's 92 kg	—N/a	Machado (BRA); L 1–4	Did not advance			
Delicious Orie	Men's +92 kg	—N/a	Chaloyan (ARM); L 2–3	Did not advance			
Charley Davison	Women's 54 kg	Akbas (TUR); L 2–3	Did not advance				
Rosie Eccles	Women's 66 kg	Rygielska (POL); L 2–3	Did not advance				
Chantelle Reid	Women's 75 kg	—N/a	El-Mardi (MAR); L 2–3	Did not advance			

== Canoeing ==
=== Slalom ===
Great Britain initially qualified a boat in the men's C-1 class at the 2023 European Games in Kraków, Poland. However, this was superseded when they secured a quota in this class at the 2023 ICF Canoe Slalom World Championships at Lea Valley in Greater London. They also qualified boats in the men's K-1 and the women's C-1 and K-1 classes at this event. All slalom canoeists qualified can also take part in the new Olympic extreme kayak/kayak cross discipline.

Team GB announced their squad for Paris on 15 November 2023. The experienced team includes former Olympic men's K-1 champion and current world champion in both this and the KX-1 discipline Joe Clarke, as well as Tokyo women's C-1 silver medallist and reigning world champion Mallory Franklin and current women's KX-1 world champion Kimberley Woods. Although C1 canoeist Adam Burgess is eligible to compete in the KX-1 kayak cross event as a C1 slalom entrant, his participation in the second event was not initially announced; Burgess' place in kayak cross was confirmed on 14 June 2024.

Athlete	Event	Preliminary						Semifinal		Final	
Athlete	Event	Run 1	Rank	Run 2	Rank	Best	Rank	Time	Rank	Time	Rank
Adam Burgess	Men's C-1	90.87	2	95.08	7	90.87	2 Q	97.21	4 Q	96.84	2nd place, silver medalist(s)
Joe Clarke	Men's K-1	136.89	23	85.62	4	85.62	4 Q	89.51	1 Q	89.82	5
Mallory Franklin	Women's C-1	104.72	5	152.41	20	104.72	6 Q	111.62	6 Q	165.15	12
Kimberley Woods	Women's K-1	97.31	9	95.95	11	95.95	12 Q	99.87	3 Q	98.94	3rd place, bronze medalist(s)

Kayak cross

Athlete	Event	Time trial	Rank	Round 1	Repechage	Heats	Quarter-finals	Semi-finals	Final	
Athlete	Event	Time trial	Rank	Position	Position	Position	Position	Position	Position	Rank
Adam Burgess	Men's KX-1	74.66	26	4 R	2 Q	4	Did not advance			31
Joe Clarke	Men's KX-1	66.08	1	1 Q	Bye	1 Q	1 Q	1 Q	2	2nd place, silver medalist(s)
Mallory Franklin	Women's KX-1	71.85	3	1 Q	Bye	1 Q	4	Did not advance		13
Kimberley Woods	Women's KX-1	74.98	16	1 Q	Bye	1 Q	1 Q	1 Q	3	3rd place, bronze medalist(s)

== Cycling ==
The first batch of riders were announced on 24 June 2024. Tom Pidcock rode in multiple disciplines, on both road and mountain bike. Team GB named the remainder of the squad on 4 July 2024.

=== Road ===
Great Britain secured a quota in the women's road time trial, when Anna Henderson finished fourth at the 2023 UCI Road World Championships women's time trial. The top ten NOCs each received one quota for the Olympic time trial. Josh Tarling secured a quota in the men's road time trial when he won the bronze medal at the same World Championships. At the end of the qualification period, Great Britain had achieved fourth place in both the men's and women's rankings, guaranteeing a full team of four riders in both road races, and second quotas in each of the time trials. Great Britain were the only NOC to secure a full slate of quotas in all four events. In the Games, however, Great Britain chose to forgo their second time trial quota in each event.

Men

Athlete	Event	Time	Rank
Tom Pidcock	Road race	6:21:24	13
Josh Tarling	Road race	6:26:57	47
Stephen Williams	Road race	6:23:16	31
Fred Wright	Road race	6:26:57	43
Josh Tarling	Time trial	36:39.95	4

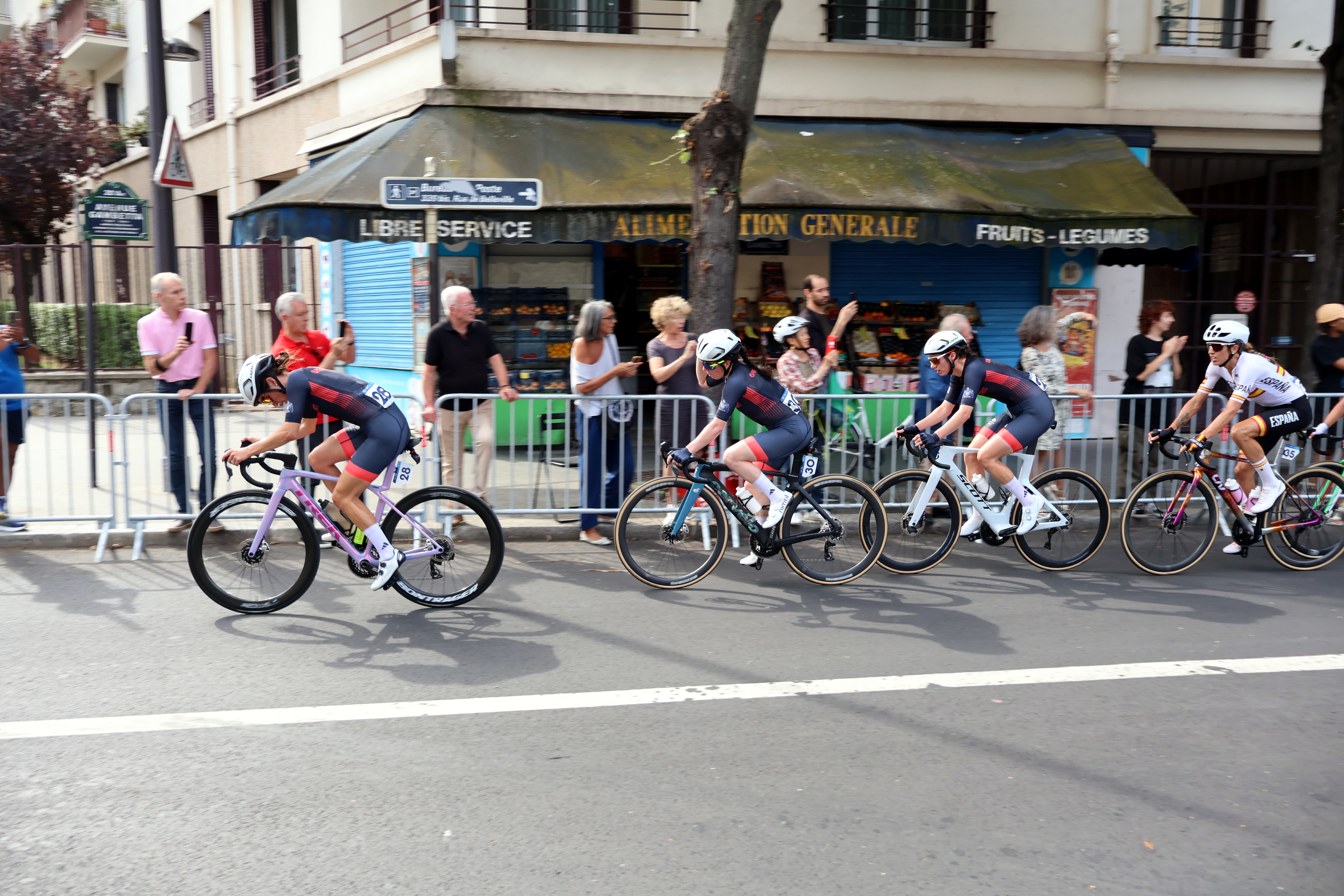
British Team at Women's individual road race.

Women

Athlete	Event	Time	Rank
Lizzie Deignan	Road race	4:02:57	12
Pfeiffer Georgi	Road race	4:00:44	5
Anna Henderson	Road race	4:02:57	13
Anna Morris	Road race	DNS	—
Anna Henderson	Time trial	41:09.83	2nd place, silver medalist(s)

=== Track ===
Results from the 2024 UCI Track Cycling Nations Cup events in Milton and Hong Kong ensured that the Great Britain women's team pursuit team could not finish below tenth overall in the team pursuit world rankings, and were thus guaranteed a quota in all three women's track endurance events in Paris. Further results in the Pan American championships, the final pre-Olympic continental qualifier, confirmed Great Britain's full track team.

Team Sprint

Athlete	Event	Qualification		Round 1		Final	
Athlete	Event	Time Speed (km/h)	Rank	Opposition Time Speed (km/h)	Rank	Opposition Time Speed (km/h)	Rank
Jack Carlin; Ed Lowe; Hamish Turnbull	Men's	41.862; 64.498	2 Q	Germany; W 41.819; 64.564; NR	1 Q	Netherlands; L 41.814; 64.572; NR	2nd place, silver medalist(s)
Sophie Capewell; Emma Finucane; Katy Marchant	Women's	45.472; 59.377; WR	1 Q	Canada; W 45.338; 59.553; WR	1 Q	New Zealand; W 45.186; 59.753; WR	1st place, gold medalist(s)

Qualification legend: FA=Gold medal final; FB=Bronze medal final

Travelling reserves: Joe Truman and Lowri Thomas.

Sprint

Athlete	Event	Qualification		Round 1	Repechage 1	Round 2	Repechage 2	Round 3	Repechage 3	Quarterfinals	Semifinals	Final	
Athlete	Event	Time Speed (km/h)	Rank	Opposition Time Speed (km/h)	Opposition Time Speed (km/h)	Opposition Time Speed (km/h)	Opposition Time Speed (km/h)	Opposition Time Speed (km/h)	Opposition Time Speed (km/h)	Opposition Time Speed (km/h)	Opposition Time Speed (km/h)	Opposition Time Speed (km/h)	Rank
Jack Carlin	Men's	9.247	5 Q	Rorke (CAN); W 9.959; 72.296	Bye	Ortega (COL); W 9.831; 73.238	Bye	Paul (TTO); W 9.961; 72.282	Bye	Ota (JPN); W 2–1	Lavreysen (NED); L 0–2	Bronze medal final Hoogland (NED); W 2–1	3rd place, bronze medalist(s)
Hamish Turnbull	Men's	9.346	7 Q	Zhou (CHN); W 9.959; 72.296	Bye	Awang (MAS); L 9.900; 72.727	Lendel (LTU); W 10.067; 71.521	Iakovlev (ISR); W 9.740; 73.922	Bye	Hoogland (NED); L 1–2	—N/a	5–8 Final; REL	=7
Sophie Capewell	Women's	10.132	4 Q	Mohd Asri (MAS); W 10.886; 66.140	Bye	Gaxiola (MEX); W 10.810; 66.605	Bye	Fulton (NZL); W 10.811; 66.599	Bye	van de Wouw (NED); L 0–2	—N/a	5–8 Final; W 10.780; 66.790	5
Emma Finucane	Women's	10.067	2 Q	Karwacka (POL); W 11.172; 64.447	Bye	v.d. Peet (NED); W 11.203; 64.268	Bye	Clonan (AUS); W 10.549; 68.523	Bye	Bayona (COL); W 2–0	Andrews (NZL); L 0–2	Bronze medal final van de Wouw (NED); W 2–0	3rd place, bronze medalist(s)

Team Pursuit

Athlete	Event	Qualification		Semifinals		Final	
Athlete	Event	Time	Rank	Opponent Results	Rank	Opponent Results	Rank
Dan Bigham; Ethan Hayter; Ethan Vernon; Oliver Wood; Charlie Tanfield	Men's	3:43.241	2 Q	Denmark; W 3:42.151; NR	1 Q	Australia; L 3:44.394	2nd place, silver medalist(s)
Elinor Barker; Neah Evans; Josie Knight; Anna Morris; Jess Roberts	Women's	4:06.710; NR	3 Q	United States; L 4:04.908	2 QB	Italy; W 4:06.382	3rd place, bronze medalist(s)

Travelling reserves: Mark Stewart, Megan Barker

Keirin

Athlete	Event	Round 1	Repechage	Quarterfinals	Semifinals	Final
Athlete	Event	Rank	Rank	Rank	Rank	Rank
Jack Carlin	Men's	2 Q	Bye	1 Q	1 Q	=4
Hamish Turnbull	Men's	4 R	1 Q	2 Q	DNF FB	11
Emma Finucane	Women's	1 Q	Bye	2 Q	3 Q	3rd place, bronze medalist(s)
Katy Marchant	Women's	3 R	2 Q	3 Q	2 Q	4

Omnium

Athlete	Event	Scratch race		Tempo race		Elimination race		Points race		Total	
Athlete	Event	Rank	Points	Rank	Points	Rank	Points	Rank	Points	Points	Rank
Ethan Hayter	Men's	6	30	12	18	1	40	8	9	97	8
Neah Evans	Women's	22	1	18	6	17	8	15	37	52	15

Madison

In the men's event travelling reserve Mark Stewart was a late replacement for Ethan Hayter who pulled out with a thigh injury. Stewart joined Oliver Wood but the pairing, who were silver medallists at the 2023 UCI Track Cycling World Championships, finished in tenth place after Wood was involved in a crash with the Dutch pair. The Netherlands were eventually disqualified improving the British team to ninth.

Athlete	Event	Points	Laps	Rank
Mark Stewart; Oliver Wood	Men's	–9	–1	9
Elinor Barker; Neah Evans	Women's	31	0	2nd place, silver medalist(s)

=== Mountain biking ===
Great Britain were assured of a quota in the men's event when the reigning Olympic champion Tom Pidcock won the gold medal at the 2023 UCI Cycling World Championships in Glasgow. A full quota of two men and two women was obtained through the final UCI mountain biking Olympic rankings.

Athlete	Event	Time	Rank
Charlie Aldridge	Men's cross-country	1:28:32	8
Tom Pidcock	Men's cross-country	1:26:22	1st place, gold medalist(s)
Ella Maclean-Howell	Women's cross-country	1:36:26	23
Evie Richards	Women's cross-country	1:29:29	5

=== BMX ===
Freestyle
Great Britain secured quotas at the 2023 UCI Cycling World Championships in Glasgow when Kieran Reilly won the gold medal in the men's event and reigning Olympic champion Charlotte Worthington ensured that her country was the third highest placed NOC in the women's event. However, these quotas will only be finalised after the completion of the qualification process to ensure full continental representation in the event. Reilly's place was confirmed on 23 June 2024 after he finished second in the Olympic Qualifier Series.

Athlete	Event	Qualification				Final			
Athlete	Event	Run 1	Run 2	Average	Rank	Run 1	Run 2	Best	Rank
Kieran Reilly	Men's freestyle	91.68	90.75	91.21	1 Q	93.70	93.91	93.91	2nd place, silver medalist(s)
Charlotte Worthington	Women's freestyle	79.20	78.82	79.01	11	Did not advance			

Race
Reigning Olympic champion Beth Shriever won the gold medal at the 2023 UCI Cycling World Championships to secure a quota for Great Britain in the women's event. A quota in the men's racing was confirmed by the UCI Olympic BMX Racing rankings.

Athlete	Event	Quarterfinal		Last chance qualifier		Semifinal		Final	
Athlete	Event	Points	Rank	Result	Rank	Points	Rank	Result	Rank
Kye Whyte	Men's race	12	10 Q	Bye		23 DNF	15	Did not advance	
Beth Shriever	Women's race	3	2 Q	Bye		3	2 Q	36.496	8

Travelling reserves: Ross Cullen, Emily Hutt

== Diving ==
British divers secured a full slate of quotas for Paris 2024. One quota in the women's individual 10 metre platform event was gained by winning a gold medal in the event at the 2023 European Games in Rzeszów, Poland, The remaining quotas were achieved by the British squads at the 2023 World Aquatics Championships in Fukuoka, Japan and the 2024 World Aquatics Championships in Doha, Qatar. The first team members were announced on 7 May 2024, with the remainder being confirmed on 12 June 2024.

Men

Athlete	Event	Preliminary		Semifinal		Final	
Athlete	Event	Points	Rank	Points	Rank	Points	Rank
Jack Laugher	3 m springboard	468.30	3 Q	467.05	3 Q	410.95	7
Jordan Houlden	3 m springboard	448.20	4 Q	445.55	5 Q	425.75	5
Noah Williams	10 m platform	446.70	8 Q	400.90	12 Q	497.35	3rd place, bronze medalist(s)
Kyle Kothari	10 m platform	433.10	9 Q	443.55	6 Q	401.55	11
Anthony Harding; Jack Laugher	3 m synchronized springboard	—N/a				438.15	3rd place, bronze medalist(s)
Tom Daley; Noah Williams	10 m synchronized platform	—N/a				463.44	2nd place, silver medalist(s)

Women

Athlete	Event	Preliminary		Semifinal		Final	
Athlete	Event	Points	Rank	Points	Rank	Points	Rank
Yasmin Harper	3 m springboard	295.75	9 Q	278.90	12 Q	305.10	5
Grace Reid	3 m springboard	303.25	5 Q	290.05	7 Q	275.80	10
Andrea Spendolini-Sirieix	10 m platform	320.80	=4 Q	367.00	3 Q	344.50	6
Lois Toulson	10 m platform	299.60	8 Q	278.50	13	Did not advance	
Yasmin Harper; Scarlett Mew Jensen	3 m synchronized springboard	—N/a				302.28	3rd place, bronze medalist(s)
Andrea Spendolini-Sirieix; Lois Toulson	10 m synchronized platform	—N/a				304.38	3rd place, bronze medalist(s)

== Equestrian ==
Great Britain entered a full squad of equestrian riders each to the team dressage, eventing, and jumping competitions through a top-six finish in dressage and top-five in jumping at the 2022 FEI World Championships in Herning, Denmark and through a top-seven finish at the Eventing Worlds in the same year in Pratoni del Vivaro, Italy. The team was named on 26 June 2024. One member of each discipline will act as traveling reserve. For dressage, Becky Moody was originally selected as traveling reserve. She replaced Charlotte Dujardin in the team after she pulled out. Andrew Gould was named as the new alternate. Joe Stockdale was named for show-jumping and Tom McEwen for eventing. Carl Hester was selected among the three dressage riders and became the second British athlete to compete at seven Olympic Games, matching the record of fellow equestrian Nick Skelton.

=== Dressage ===
Athlete	Horse	Event	Grand Prix		Grand Prix Special		Grand Prix Freestyle	
Athlete	Horse	Event	Score	Rank	Score	Rank	Score	Rank
Lottie Fry	Glamourdale	Individual	78.913	3 q	—N/a		88.971	3rd place, bronze medalist(s)
Carl Hester	Fame	Individual	77.345	3 q	—N/a		85.161	6
Becky Moody	Jagerbomb	Individual	74.938	1 Q	—N/a		84.357	8
Lottie Fry; Carl Hester; Becky Moody	See above	Team	231.196	3 Q	232.492	3rd place, bronze medalist(s)	—N/a	

=== Eventing ===
Athlete	Horse	Event	Dressage		Cross-country			Jumping						Total	
Athlete	Horse	Event	Dressage		Cross-country			Qualifier			Final			Total	
Athlete	Horse	Event	Penalties	Rank	Penalties	Total	Rank	Penalties	Total	Rank	Penalties	Total	Rank	Penalties	Rank
Rosalind Canter	Lordships Graffalo	Individual	23.40	6	15.00	38.40	24	4.00	42.40	23 Q	Did not advance			42.40	21
Laura Collett	London 52	Individual	17.50	1	0.80	18.30	2	4.80	23.20	3 Q	0.0	23.20	3	23.20	3rd place, bronze medalist(s)
Tom McEwen	JL Dublin	Individual	25.80	11	0.00	25.80	6	0.0	25.80	4 Q	0.0	25.80	4	25.80	4
Rosalind Canter; Laura Collett; Tom McEwen	See above	Team	66.70	1	15.80	82.50	1	8.80	91.30	1	—N/a			91.30	1st place, gold medalist(s)

=== Jumping ===
Athlete	Horse	Event	Qualification			Final			Jump-off		
Athlete	Horse	Event	Penalties	Time	Rank	Penalties	Time	Rank	Penalties	Time	Rank
Scott Brash	Hello Jefferson	Individual	0	75.78	12 Q	4	81.23	6	Did not advance		
Harry Charles	Romeo 88	Individual	0	75.72	11 Q	WD			Did not advance		
Ben Maher	Dallas Vegas Batilly	Individual	4	73.24	28 Q	4	81.70	9	Did not advance		
Scott Brash; Ben Maher; Harry Charles	See above	Team	8	227.79	3 Q	2	237.47	1st place, gold medalist(s)	—N/a		

== Field hockey ==
Summary

Key:

- FT – After full-time.
- P – Match decided by penalty-shootout.

Team	Event	Group stage						Quarterfinal	Semifinal	Final / BM	
Team	Event	Opposition Score	Opposition Score	Opposition Score	Opposition Score	Opposition Score	Rank	Opposition Score	Opposition Score	Opposition Score	Rank
Great Britain men's	Men's tournament	Spain; W 4–0	South Africa; D 2–2	Netherlands D 2–2	France; W 2–1	Germany; L 1–2	3 Q	India; L 2–4^{P} FT: 1–1	Did not advance		7
Great Britain women's	Women's tournament	Spain; L 1–2	Australia; L 0–4	South Africa; W 2–1	United States; W 5–2	Argentina; L 0–3	4 Q	Netherlands; L 1–3	Did not advance		8

=== Men's tournament ===
Great Britain men's national field hockey team qualified for the Olympics by finishing in the top three at the 2024 FIH Olympic Qualifiers. During the tournament, Tom Sorsby and Tim Nurse, who had heen selected as a travelling reserves, were brought into the playing squad as replacements for the injured David Goodfield and Nick Park respectively.

Squad Great Britain announced their squad on 18 June 2024.

Head coach: (South Africa) Paul Revington

No.	Pos.	Player	Date of birth (age)	Caps	Club
2	DF	Nick Park	8 April 1999 (aged 25)	39	(England) Surbiton
3	MF	Jack Waller	28 January 1997 (aged 27)	116	(England) Wimbledon
5	DF	David Ames (Captain)	25 June 1989 (aged 35)	232	(England) Holcombe
6	MF	Jacob Draper	24 July 1998 (aged 26)	138	(Netherlands) Pinoké
7	MF	Zachary Wallace	29 September 1999 (aged 24)	118	(Netherlands) Bloemendaal
8	MF	Rupert Shipperley	21 November 1992 (aged 31)	177	(England) Hampstead & Westminster
13	FW	Sam Ward	24 December 1990 (aged 33)	258	(England) Old Georgians
14	DF	James Albery	2 October 1995 (aged 28)	71	(England) Old Georgians
15	FW	Phil Roper	24 January 1992 (aged 32)	254	(England) Holcombe
19	MF	David Goodfield	15 June 1993 (aged 31)	110	(England) Surbiton
20	GK	Ollie Payne	6 April 1999 (aged 25)	73	(England) Holcombe
27	DF	Liam Sanford	14 March 1996 (aged 28)	109	(England) Old Georgians
28	MF	Lee Morton	23 May 1995 (aged 29)	121	(England) Old Georgians
29	MF	Tom Sorsby	28 October 1996 (aged 27)	109	(England) Sheffield
30	DF	Conor Williamson	20 December 2001 (aged 22)	18	(England) Surbiton
31	FW	Will Calnan	17 April 1996 (aged 28)	103	(England) Southgate
33	MF	Tim Nurse	11 May 1999 (aged 25)	40	(England) Bournemouth
38	DF	Gareth Furlong	10 May 1992 (aged 32)	159	(England) Surbiton

Group play

Pos	Team	Pld	W	D	L	GF	GA	GD	Pts	Qualification
1	Germany	5	4	0	1	16	6	+10	12	Advance to quarter-finals
2	Netherlands	5	3	1	1	16	9	+7	10	Advance to quarter-finals
3	Great Britain	5	2	2	1	11	7	+4	8	Advance to quarter-finals
4	Spain	5	2	1	2	11	12	−1	7	Advance to quarter-finals
5	South Africa	5	1	1	3	11	17	−6	4	
6	France (H)	5	0	1	4	8	22	−14	1	

Source: FIH
Rules for classification: 1) points; 2) matches won; 3) goal difference; 4) goals for; 5) head-to-head result; 6) field goals scored.
(H) Hosts

27 July 2024
10:00
v

Great Britain	4–0	Spain
Park 13'; Furlong 16', 48'; Shipperley 58'	Report

Pitch 1
Umpires:
Steve Rogers (AUS)
Raghu Prasad (IND)

28 July 2024
20:15
v

South Africa	2–2	Great Britain
Hobson 11'; Sherwood 53'	Report	Roper 32'; Shipperley 59'

Pitch 2
Umpires:
Marcin Grochal (POL)
Laurine Delforge (BEL)

30 July 2024
12:45
v

Great Britain	2–2	Netherlands
Morton 56', 58'	Report	Wortelboer 45'; Van Dam 52'

Pitch 1
Umpires:
Gabriel Labate (ARG)
Ben Göntgen (GER)

1 August 2024
12:45
v

France	1–2	Great Britain
Clément 30'	Report	Wallace 41'; Albery 54'

Pitch 1
Umpires:
Sean Rapaport (RSA)
David Tomlinson (NZL)

2 August 2024
20:15
v

Great Britain	1–2	Germany
Furlong 49'	Report	Rühr 19', 25'

Pitch 2
Umpires:
Coen van Bunge (NED)
Gareth Greenfield (NZL)

Quarterfinal

4 August 2024
10:00
v

India	1–1	Great Britain
Harmanpreet 22'	Report; Shootout report	Morton 27'
Penalties
Harmanpreet (penalty shoot-out scored); Sukhjeet (penalty shoot-out scored); Lalit (penalty shoot-out scored); Raj Kumar (penalty shoot-out scored)	4–2	(penalty shoot-out scored) Albery; (penalty shoot-out scored) Wallace; (penalty shoot-out missed) Williamson; (penalty shoot-out missed) Roper

Pitch 1
Umpires:
Sean Rapaport (RSA)
Steve Rogers (AUS)

=== Women's tournament ===
Great Britain women's national field hockey team qualified for the Olympics by finishing in the top three at the 2024 FIH Olympic Qualifiers.

The squad was announced on 18 June 2024.

Squad The squad was announced on 18 June 2024.

Head coach: (Scotland) David Ralph

No.	Pos.	Player	Date of birth (age)	Caps	Goals	Club
4	MF	(England) Laura Roper	8 March 1988 (aged 36)	350	22	(England) East Grinstead
6	DF	(England) Anna Toman	29 April 1993 (aged 31)	139	14	(England) Wimbledon
7	FW	(England) Hannah French	30 December 1994 (aged 29)	144	55	(England) Surbiton
8	FW	(Wales) Sarah Jones	25 June 1990 (aged 34)	178	30	(England) Wimbledon
9	DF	(Scotland) Amy Costello	14 January 1998 (aged 26)	134	19	(England) Surbiton
10	FW	(Scotland) Sarah Robertson	27 September 1993 (aged 30)	207	26	(England) Hampstead & Westminster
12	FW	(Scotland) Charlotte Watson	23 April 1998 (aged 26)	115	33	(England) Loughborough Students
14	FW	(England) Tessa Howard	6 January 1999 (aged 25)	91	35	(England) East Grinstead
16	MF	(England) Isabelle Petter	27 June 2000 (aged 24)	105	15	(England) Surbiton
18	DF	(England) Giselle Ansley	31 March 1992 (aged 32)	221	59	(England) Surbiton
20	DF	(England) Hollie Pearne-Webb (Captain)	19 September 1990 (aged 33)	264	20	(England) Wimbledon
21	MF	(England) Fiona Crackles	11 February 2000 (aged 24)	87	3	(England) Wimbledon
23	MF	(England) Sophie Hamilton	28 February 2001 (aged 23)	71	7	(England) Surbiton
26	MF	(England) Lily Owsley	10 December 1994 (aged 29)	235	79	(England) Hampstead & Westminster
28	MF	(England) Flora Peel	19 September 1996 (aged 27)	56	1	(England) Wimbledon
40	GK	(England) Miriam Pritchard	21 December 1998 (aged 25)	13	0	(England) Holcombe

Group play

Pos	Team	Pld	W	D	L	GF	GA	GD	Pts	Qualification
1	Australia	5	4	1	0	15	5	+10	13	Quarter-finals
2	Argentina	5	4	1	0	16	7	+9	13	Quarter-finals
3	Spain	5	2	1	2	6	7	−1	7	Quarter-finals
4	Great Britain	5	2	0	3	8	12	−4	6	Quarter-finals
5	United States	5	1	1	3	5	13	−8	4	
6	South Africa	5	0	0	5	4	10	−6	0	

Source: FIH
Rules for classification: 1) points; 2) matches won; 3) goal difference; 4) goals for; 5) head-to-head result; 6) field goals scored.

28 July 2024
13:15
v

Great Britain	1–2	Spain
Ansley 4'	Report	L. Barrios 4'; Riera 9'

Pitch 2
Umpires:
Annelize Rostron (RSA)
Liu Xiaoying (CHN)

29 July 2024
17:00
v

Great Britain	0–4	Australia
	Report	Greiner 17'; Arnott 19'; T. Stewart 46'; G. Stewart 52'

Pitch 1
Umpires:
Alison Keogh (IRE)
Irene Presenqui (ARG)

31 July 2024
10:30
v

South Africa	1–2	Great Britain
De Waal 6'	Report	Costello 19'; French 42'

Pitch 2
Umpires:
Amber Church (NZL)
Cookie Tan (SGP)

1 August 2024
17:00
v

United States	2–5	Great Britain
Tamer 7', 29'	Report	Hamilton 4'; Howard 14', 25'; French 35'; Jones 39'

Pitch 1
Umpires:
Steve Rodgers (AUS)
Ayanna McClean (TTO)

3 August 2024
10:00
v

Great Britain	0–3	Argentina
	Report	Raposo 34'; Albertario 35'; Díaz 55'

Pitch 1
Umpires:
Laurine Delforge (BEL)
Emi Yamada (JPN)

Quarterfinal

5 August 2024
17:30
v

Netherlands	3–1	Great Britain
De Waard 1'; Fokke 30', 46'	Report	French 20'

Pitch 1
Umpires:
Liu Xiaoying (CHN)
Irene Presenqui (ARG)

== Golf ==
Great Britain qualified two players for both the men's and women's tournaments via the world rankings as at 17 and 24 June 2024 respectively. Matt Fitzpatrick and Tommy Fleetwood were named as the men's representatives on 21 June 2024. Georgia Hall and Charley Hull were announced as the women's representatives on 28 June 2024.

Athlete	Event	Round 1	Round 2	Round 3	Round 4	Total		
Athlete	Event	Score	Score	Score	Score	Score	Par	Rank
Matt Fitzpatrick	Men's	73	64	81	WD	–	–	–
Tommy Fleetwood	Men's	67	64	69	66	266	−18	2nd place, silver medalist(s)
Charley Hull	Women's	81	71	69	68	289	+1	T27
Georgia Hall	Women's	74	74	71	74	293	+5	T36

== Gymnastics ==
=== Artistic ===
Great Britain fielded a full squad of ten artistic gymnasts for Paris after achieving top-three finishes in both the men's and women's team all-around competitions at the 2022 World Championships in Liverpool. The team was announced on 13 June 2024. James Hall was named reserve for the men's team. Max Whitlock was attempting to become the first male gymnast to medal at four successive games on a single apparatus but finished fourth in the pommel horse final.

Men
Team

Athlete	Event	Qualification								Final							
Athlete	Event	Apparatus						Total	Rank	Apparatus						Total	Rank
Athlete	Event	F	PH	R	V	PB	HB	Total	Rank	F	PH	R	V	PB	HB	Total	Rank
Joe Fraser	Team	~~13.533~~	14.000	13.700	~~14.300~~	14.933	14.200	84.666	6 Q	—N/a	13.933	13.766	—N/a	14.633	13.633	—N/a	
Harry Hepworth	Team	14.166	—N/a	14.700 Q	14.633 Q	—N/a				14.700	—N/a	14.800	14.966	—N/a		—N/a	
Jake Jarman	Team	14.966 Q	14.266	12.900	15.166 Q	14.266	13.333	84.897	5 Q	14.966	14.133	—N/a	15.266	14.366	13.400	—N/a	
Luke Whitehouse	Team	14.533 Q	~~11.733~~	~~12.400~~	14.500	13.900	~~12.466~~	79.532	32	14.500	—N/a	13.266	13.033	—N/a		—N/a	
Max Whitlock	Team	—N/a	15.166 Q	—N/a		~~13.900~~	13.233	—N/a		—N/a	15.266	—N/a		13.900	13.000	—N/a	
Total	Team	43.665	43.432	41.300	44.299	43.099	40.766	256.561	3 Q	44.166	43.332	41.832	43.265	42.899	40.033	255.527	4

Individual

Athlete	Event	Qualification								Final							
Athlete	Event	Apparatus						Total	Rank	Apparatus						Total	Rank
Athlete	Event	F	PH	R	V	PB	HB	Total	Rank	F	PH	R	V	PB	HB	Total	Rank
Joe Fraser	All-around	See team results above								14.300	13.700	14.00	14.333	14.933	14.266	85.532	5
Harry Hepworth	Rings	—N/a		14.790	—N/a				8 Q	—N/a		14.800	—N/a			14.800	7
Harry Hepworth	Vault	—N/a			14.766	—N/a			2 Q	—N/a			14.949	—N/a		14.949	3rd place, bronze medalist(s)
Jake Jarman	All-around	See team results above								14.900	14.066	12.800	15.166	14.300	13.333	84.565	7
Jake Jarman	Floor	14.966	—N/a						1 Q	14.933	—N/a					14.933	3rd place, bronze medalist(s)
Jake Jarman	Vault	—N/a			14.699	—N/a			5 Q	—N/a			14.933	—N/a		14.933	4
Luke Whitehouse	Floor	14.533	—N/a						5 Q	14.466	—N/a					14.466	6
Max Whitlock	Pommel horse	—N/a	15.166	—N/a					3 Q	—N/a	15.200	—N/a				15.200	4

Women
Team

Athlete	Event	Qualification						Final					
Athlete	Event	Apparatus				Total	Rank	Apparatus				Total	Rank
Athlete	Event	V	UB	BB	F	Total	Rank	V	UB	BB	F	Total	Rank
Becky Downie	Team	—N/a	14.666 Q	13.400	—N/a			—N/a	14.933	12.933	—N/a	—N/a	
Ruby Evans	Team	14.200	~~11.200~~	~~12.600~~	13.133	51.133	38	13.966	—N/a		13.100	—N/a	
Georgia-Mae Fenton	Team	13.833	12.833	13.500	~~12.466~~	52.632	20 Q	13.800	14.000	13.566	—N/a	—N/a	
Alice Kinsella	Team	13.933	11.900	13.433	13.433	51.999	23 Q	13.966	13.300	13.600	13.633	—N/a	
Abigail Martin	Team	~~13.766~~	—N/a		13.266	—N/a		—N/a	—N/a	—N/a	13.466	—N/a	
Total	Team	41.966	39.399	40.333	39.132	160.830	7 Q	41.732	42.233	40.099	40.199	164.263	4

Individual

Athlete	Event	Qualification						Final					
Athlete	Event	Apparatus				Total	Rank	Apparatus				Total	Rank
Athlete	Event	V	UB	BB	F	Total	Rank	V	UB	BB	F	Total	Rank
Becky Downie	Uneven bars	—N/a	14.666	—N/a			7 Q	—N/a	13.633	—N/a		13.633	7
Georgia-Mae Fenton	All-around	See team results						13.633	13.800	11.300	13.033	51.766	18
Alice Kinsella	All-around	See team results						13.800	14.133	13.033	12.833	53.799	12

=== Trampoline ===
Great Britain qualified a gymnast for the men's and women's trampoline by finishing in the top eight of both events at the 2023 World Championships in Birmingham, United Kingdom. A second female trampoline gymnast qualified through the Trampoline World Cup Series. The team was announced on 13 June 2024.

Athlete	Event	Qualification		Final	
Athlete	Event	Score	Rank	Score	Rank
Zak Perzamanos	Men's	59.030	7 Q	59.840	4
Bryony Page	Women's	55.620	5 Q	56.480	1st place, gold medalist(s)
Isabelle Songhurst	Women's	52.920	14	Did not advance	

== Judo ==
Qualification ended on 23 June 2024 and Great Britain had five judokas, all women, in qualifying positions. In the two heavier classes, Great Britain has two judoka in each class in qualification position, from which they will select one per class. The team was announced on 30 June 2024.

Athlete	Event	Round of 32	Round of 16	Quarterfinals	Semifinals	Repechage	Final / BM	
Athlete	Event	Opposition Result	Opposition Result	Opposition Result	Opposition Result	Opposition Result	Opposition Result	Rank
Chelsie Giles	Women's −52 kg	Bye	Pimenta (BRA) L 0-1	Did not advance				9
Lele Nairne	Women's –57 kg	Liparteliani (GEO); L 0-10	Did not advance					17
Lucy Renshall	Women's −63 kg	Haecker (AUS); W 11–2	Piovesana (AUT); L 0–1	Did not advance				9
Jemima Yeats-Brown	Women's −70 kg	Rasoanaivo (MAD); W 1–0	Polleres (AUT); L 0–1	Did not advance				9
Emma Reid	Women's −78 kg	Yoon (KOR); L 0–10	Did not advance					17

== Modern pentathlon ==
British modern pentathletes confirmed four quota places for Paris 2024. Defending champion Joe Choong, along with rookie Olivia Green on the women's side, secured a quota each in their respective individual events by finishing among the eight highest-ranked modern pentathletes eligible for qualification at the 2023 European Games in Kraków, Poland; Kerenza Bryson gained a quota by winning a bronze medal at the 2023 UIPM World Championships in Bath; and Myles Pillage qualified a quota through the final Olympic ranking. In the women's section, both defending Olympic champion Kate French and Jessica Varley were also in qualification positions, as was Charlie Brown in the men' section. Great Britain could elect any of the eligible athletes so long as they remain within the two per NOC limit.

In the event, Team GB selected reigning Olympic Champion Kate French over Olivia Green, otherwise selecting those three athletes that had secured the primary qualification. On 20 July 2024, Team GB announced that Pillage had withdrawn for injury reasons, to be replaced by Charlie Brown.

French qualified for the women's final at the Games with a fifth place finish in her semi-final, but withdrew due to illness.

Athlete	Event	Fencing ranking round (Épée one touch)			Semifinal													Final												
Athlete	Event	Fencing ranking round (Épée one touch)			Fencing	Swimming (200 m freestyle)			Riding (Show jumping)				Shooting / Running (10 m laser pistol / 3000 m cross-country)			Total		Fencing	Swimming			Riding				Shooting / Running			Total	
Athlete	Event	V – D	Rank	MP points	BP	Time	Rank	MP points	Time	Rank	Pen	MP points	Time	Rank	MP Points	Rank	MP points	BP	Time	Rank	MP points	Time	Rank	Pen	MP points	Time	Rank	MP Points	Pts	Rank
Charlie Brown	Men's	14–21	27	195	0	2:02.45	8	306	62.47	2	0	300	10:05.18	1	695	10	1493	Did not advance												
Joe Choong	Men's	14–21	29	195	8	1:58.71	1	313	57.86	10	14	286	10:07.85	2	693	8 Q	1497	4	1:57.52	1	315	61.07	7	7	293	9:48.09	4	712	1519	9
Kerenza Bryson	Women's	21–14	5	230	4	2:20.92	14	269	59.83	3	0	300	11:41.88	7	599	1 Q	1402 OR	0	2:21.77	15	267	62.27	15	14	286	11:19.12	10	621	1404	9
Kate French	Women's	23–12	3	240	0	2:15.56	6	279	60.65	7	7	293	11:54.55	11	586	5 Q	1398	Withdrew												

== Rowing ==
Great Britain's rowers qualified boats in each of the following classes at the 2023 World Rowing Championships in Belgrade, Serbia or the Final Olympic Qualification Regatta in May 2024. The team was named on 5 June 2024. Great Britain won eight rowing medals, including three golds, representing the team's best ever haul from an overseas Olympics.

Men

Athlete	Event	Heats		Repechage		Semifinals		Final	
Athlete	Event	Time	Rank	Time	Rank	Time	Rank	Time	Rank
Ollie Wynne-Griffith; Tom George	Pair	6:33.88	1 SA/B	Bye		6:31.56	2 FA	6:24.11	2nd place, silver medalist(s)
Oli Wilkes; David Ambler; Matt Aldridge; Freddie Davidson	Four	6:05.63	2 FA	Bye		—N/a		5:52.42	3rd place, bronze medalist(s)
Tom Barras; Callum Dixon; Matt Haywood; Graeme Thomas	Quadruple sculls	5:44.82	2 FA	Bye		—N/a		5:46.51	4
Sholto Carnegie; Rory Gibbs; Morgan Bolding; Jacob Dawson; Charlie Elwes; Tom Digby; James Rudkin; Tom Ford; Harry Brightmore (cox)	Eight	5:37.04	1 FA	Bye		—N/a		5:22.88	1st place, gold medalist(s)

Women

Athlete	Event	Heats		Repechage		Semifinals		Final	
Athlete	Event	Time	Rank	Time	Rank	Time	Rank	Time	Rank
Chloe Brew; Rebecca Edwards	Pair	7:29.70	4 R	7:37.11	3 SA/B	7:28.76	5 FB	7:16.02	12
Becky Wilde; Mathilda Hodgkins-Byrne	Double sculls	6:52.31	2 SA/B	Bye		6:51.82	2 FA	6:53.22	3rd place, bronze medalist(s)
Emily Craig; Imogen Grant	Lightweight double sculls	7:04.20	1 SA/B	Bye		6:59.79	1 FA	6:47.06	1st place, gold medalist(s)
Helen Glover; Esme Booth; Sam Redgrave; Rebecca Shorten	Four	6:42.57	1 FA	Bye		—N/a		6:27.31	2nd place, silver medalist(s)
Lauren Henry; Hannah Scott; Lola Anderson; Georgie Brayshaw	Quadruple sculls	6:13.35	1 FA	Bye		—N/a		6:16.31	1st place, gold medalist(s)
Heidi Long; Rowan McKellar; Holly Dunford; Emily Ford; Lauren Irwin; Eve Stewart; Hattie Taylor; Annie Campbell-Orde; Henry Fieldman (cox)	Eight	6:16.20	1 FA	Bye		—N/a		5:59.51	3rd place, bronze medalist(s)

Travelling reserves: James Robson, Olivia Bates and Lucy Glover.

Qualification Legend: FA=Final A (medal); FB=Final B (non-medal); FC=Final C (non-medal); FD=Final D (non-medal); FE=Final E (non-medal); FF=Final F (non-medal); SA/B=Semifinals A/B; SC/D=Semifinals C/D; SE/F=Semifinals E/F; QF=Quarterfinals; R=Repechage

== Rugby sevens ==
Summary

Team	Event	Pool round				Quarterfinal	Semifinal	Final / BM	
Team	Event	Opposition Result	Opposition Result	Opposition Result	Rank	Opposition Result	Opposition Result	Opposition Result	Rank
Great Britain women's	Women's tournament	Ireland; W 21–12	Australia; L 5–36	South Africa; W 26–17	2 Q	United States; L 7–17	Classification s-final 5–8; China; L 15–19	Classification final 7–8; Ireland; W 28–12	7

=== Women's tournament ===
Great Britain women's national rugby sevens team qualified for the Olympics by winning the gold medal and securing an outright berth at the 2023 European Games in Kraków.

The squad was announced on 19 June 2024.

Squad Great Britain's squad of 12 players was named on 19 June 2024. Additionally, Abi Burton and Kayleigh Powell were named as traveling reserves.

Head coach: Nick Wakley

- Amy Wilson-Hardy
- Ellie Boatman
- Ellie Kildunne
- Emma Uren (c)
- Grace Crompton
- Heather Cowell
- Isla Norman-Bell
- Jade Shekells
- Jasmine Joyce
- Lauren Torley
- Lisa Thomson
- Megan Jones

Group stage

Pos	Team	Pld	W	D	L	PF	PA	PD	Pts	Qualification
1	Australia	3	3	0	0	89	24	+65	9	Quarter-finals
2	(United Kingdom) Great Britain	3	2	0	1	52	65	−13	7	Quarter-finals
3	(Republic of Ireland) Ireland	3	1	0	2	64	40	+24	5	Quarter-finals
4	South Africa	3	0	0	3	22	98	−76	3	

Source: World Rugby
Rules for classification: 1) Points; 2) Head-to-head result; 3) Point difference; 4) Points scored.

28 July 2024
15:30

Ireland	12–21	Great Britain
Try: Murphy Crowe (2) 3' m, 10' c Con: Mulhall (1/2) 10'	World Rugby	Try: Norman-Bell 4' c Joyce 8' c Uren 10' c Con: Norman-Bell (3/3) 4', 8', 10'

Stade de France, Paris
Referee: Kat Roche (United States)

28 July 2024
19:30

Australia	36–5	Great Britain
Try: M. Levi (3) 3' c, 7' m, 10' m Terita (2) 8' c, 10' c T. Levi 14' m Con: Hinds (2/3) 3', 10'; T. Levi (1/3) 10'	World Rugby	Try: Cowell 2' m

Stade de France, Paris
Referee: Maria Latos (Germany)

29 July 2024
14:00

Great Britain	26–17	South Africa
Try: Crompton 8' c Norman-Bell 8' c Joyce (2) 11' m, 14' c Con: Norman-Bell (3/3) 8', 8', 15'	World Rugby	Try: Janse van Rensburg 1' c Roos 6' m Malinga 10' m Con: Roos (1/3) 1'

Stade de France, Paris
Referee: Tyler Miller (Australia)

Quarter-finals

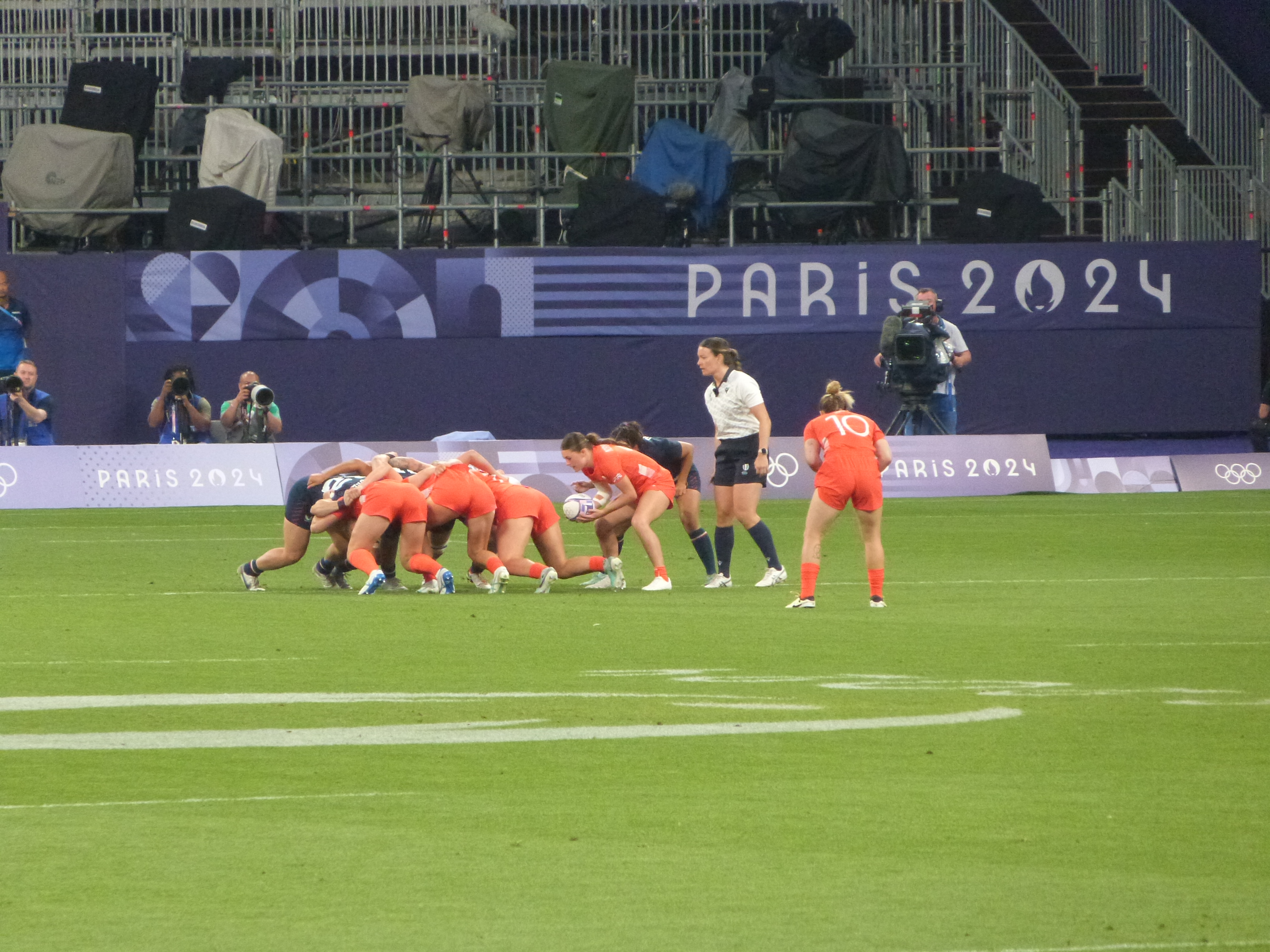
Great Britain scrum against the United States

29 July 2024
21:30

Great Britain	7–17	United States
Try: Boatman 2' c Con: Thomson (1/1) 2'	World Rugby	Try: Tapper 6' m Kirshe 8' c Sullivan 11' m Con: Canett (1/1) 8'

Stade de France, Paris
Referee: Maggie Cogger-Orr (New Zealand)

5–8th place playoff semi-finals

30 July 2024
14:30

China	19–15	Great Britain
Try: Chen 3' c Yang 6' c Hu 16' m Con: Chen (1/1) 4'; Gu (1/2) 7'	World Rugby	Try: Kildunne 2' m Joyce 8' m Boatman 9' m

Stade de France, Paris
Referee: Cisco Lopez (United States)

Seventh place match

30 July 2024
18:00

Great Britain	28–12	Ireland
Try: Jones (2) 2' c, 9' c Shekells 7' c Cowell 9' c Con: Jones (1/1) 3'; Uren (2/2) 7', 16'; Norman-Bell (1/1) 9'	World Rugby	Try: Burns 5' m Boles 10' c Con: Flood (1/1) 14'

Stade de France, Paris
Referee: Tyler Miller (Australia)

== Sailing ==
British sailors qualified boats in eight classes at the 2023 Sailing World Championships in The Hague, Netherlands. Qualification in the men's Formula Kite and mixed 470 classes was achieved at later events to give Great Britain a full team for the sailing events for the sixth consecutive Games. On 11 October 2023, it was announced that ten sailors had been selected as the first athletes chosen in any sport to represent Team GB in Paris. They included Tokyo 2020 medallists Anna Burnet, John Gimson and Emma Wilson.

Elimination events

Athlete	Event	Race																				Net points	Rank	Race													Final rank
Athlete	Event	1	2	3	4	5	6	7	8	9	10	11	12	13	14	15	16	17	18	19	20	Net points	Rank	QF	SF1	SF2	SF3	SF4	SF5	SF6	F1	F2	F3	F4	F5	F6	Final rank
Sam Sills	Men's IQFoil	~~21~~	6	9	7	~~16~~	6	7	9	4	15	7	6	12	Cancelled							88	8 QF	2Q	4	—N/a					Did not advance	—N/a					5
Connor Bainbridge	Men's Formula Kite	4	8	3	7	7	~~11~~	~~11~~	Cancelled									—N/a				29	8 SF	—N/a	3	Not required					Did not advance						8
Emma Wilson	Women's IQFoil	1	2	1	2	~~17~~	1	1	1	1	~~3~~	1	1	3	3	Cancelled						18	1 F	Bye		—N/a					3	—N/a					3rd place, bronze medalist(s)
Ellie Aldridge	Women's Formula Kite	1	2	2	3	4	~~21~~	Cancelled										—N/a				12	2 F	—N/a	Bye						1	1	Not required				1st place, gold medalist(s)

Medal race events

Athlete	Event	Race													Net points	Final rank
Athlete	Event	1	2	3	4	5	6	7	8	9	10	11	12	M*	Net points	Final rank
Michael Beckett	Men's ILCA 7	19	9	15	8	4	4	~~BFD~~	8	Cancelled		—N/a		20	87	6
Hannah Snellgrove	Women's ILCA 6	17	20	6	1	1	14	20	29	~~32~~	Cancelled	—N/a		EL	108	12
James Peters; Fynn Sterritt	Men's 49er	18	11	13	6	5	4	5	11	1	~~19~~	6	5	14	99	7
Freya Black; Saskia Tidey	Women's 49erFX	9	16	8	~~UFD~~	14	19	9	14	3	9	15	4	EL	120	16
Chris Grube; Vita Heathcote	Mixed 470	2	16	8	5	12	~~UFD~~	15	7	Cancelled		—N/a		EL	65	11
John Gimson; Anna Burnet	Mixed Nacra 17	8	4	6	3	4	~~9~~	4	5	4	5	1	3	22 DSQ	69	4

M = Medal race; BFD = Black flag disqualification; EL = Eliminated – did not advance into the medal race; UFD = "U" Flag disqualification

== Shooting ==
British shooters achieved quota places for the following events based on their results at the 2022 and 2023 ISSF World Championships, 2022, 2023, and 2024 European Championships, 2023 European Games, and 2024 ISSF World Olympic Qualification Tournament. Shooters who gain a quota place may also take part in other events for which they have a sufficient qualification score, a rule that will allow Seonaid McIntosh to take part in the 50 metre three-position rifle event. Michael Bargeron achieved a quota in the 50 metre 3-position air rifle for men at the ISSF World Qualification event, which also entitled Great Britain to a team consisting of Bargeron and McIntosh in the mixed team 10m air rifle. The team was officially confirmed on 28 June 2024.

Men

Athlete	Event	Qualification		Final	
Athlete	Event	Points	Rank	Points	Rank
Michael Bargeron	10 m air rifle	620.7	47	Did not advance	
Michael Bargeron	50 m rifle 3 positions	584	29	Did not advance	
Matthew Coward-Holley	Trap	117	25	Did not advance	
Nathan Hales	Trap	123	2 Q	48 OR	1st place, gold medalist(s)

Women

Athlete	Event	Qualification		Final	
Athlete	Event	Points	Rank	Points	Rank
Seonaid McIntosh	10 m air rifle	624.5	37	Did not advance	
Seonaid McIntosh	50 m rifle 3 positions	586	12	Did not advance	
Lucy Hall	Trap	117	14	Did not advance	
Amber Rutter	Skeet	122	2 Q	55+6	2nd place, silver medalist(s)

Mixed

Athlete	Event	Qualification		Final / BM	
Athlete	Event	Points	Rank	Points	Rank
Michael Bargeron; Seonaid McIntosh	10 m air rifle team	622.1	26	Did not advance	

== Skateboarding ==
Great Britain entered three skateboarders to compete in the park events at the Games. Sky Brown and Lola Tambling qualified among the top 20 eligible skateboarders in the women's park with Andy Macdonald matching this in the men's competition following the 2024 Olympic Qualifier Series events in Shanghai and Budapest. The 50 year old Macdonald had previously represented the USA but qualified to compete for Great Britain at his first Olympic Games due to his father's nationality. The team was officially named on 1 July 2024.

Athlete	Event	Heat		Final	
Athlete	Event	Score	Rank	Score	Rank
Andy Macdonald	Men's park	77.66	18	Did not advance	
Sky Brown	Women's park	84.75	4 Q	92.31	3rd place, bronze medalist(s)
Lola Tambling	Women's park	73.85	15	Did not advance	

== Sport climbing ==
Toby Roberts won the European continental qualifying event in Laval, France in October, 2023 to secure Great Britain a quota in the men's boulder and lead combined event. A further three qualifications were confirmed at the 2024 Olympic Qualifier Series events in Shanghai and Budapest. The team was officially announced on 3 July 2024. Roberts won gold to claim the first ever sport climbing Olympic medal for Great Britain.

Boulder & lead combined

Athlete	Event	Qualification							Final						
Athlete	Event	Boulder		Lead			Total	Rank	Boulder		Lead			Total	Rank
Athlete	Event	Result	Place	Hold	Score	Place	Total	Rank	Result	Place	Hold	Score	Place	Total	Rank
Hamish McArthur	Men's	34.2	8	35+	45.1	8	79.3	8 Q	53.9	4	42	72.0	6	125.9	5
Toby Roberts	Men's	54.1	3	42+	68.1	=2	122.2	2 Q	63.1	3	47+	92.1	3	155.2	1st place, gold medalist(s)
Erin McNeice	Women's	59.6	10	40+	64.1	7	123.7	7 Q	59.5	=4	41+	68.1	6	127.6	5
Molly Thompson-Smith	Women's	9.8	19	38	57.0	9	66.8	19	did not advance						19

== Swimming ==
British swimmers achieved the entry standards in the following events for Paris 2024 (a maximum of two swimmers under the Olympic Qualifying Time (OST) and potentially at the Olympic Consideration Time (OCT)): British Swimming's own selection policy is more restrictive, and not all qualifying swimmers may be selected for Paris.

Leah Crisp secured a continental quota in the women's 10 km open water event at the 2024 World Aquatics Championships in Doha. Hector Pardoe and Tobias Robinson also qualified for the men's event at the same championships.

The remaining 30 members of the team were announced on 16 April 2024, following the end of the main qualification event, the 2024 Aquatics GB Swimming Championships. Included were returning Olympic champions Matt Richards, Duncan Scott, James Guy, Tom Dean, Adam Peaty, Kathleen Dawson, Anna Hopkin and Freya Anderson.

Men

Athlete	Event	Heat		Semifinal		Final	
Athlete	Event	Time	Rank	Time	Rank	Time	Rank
Ben Proud	50 m freestyle	21.70	5 Q	21.38	1 Q	21.30	2nd place, silver medalist(s)
Alexander Cohoon	50 m freestyle	22.31	33	Did not advance			
Matt Richards	100 m freestyle	48.40	13 Q	48.09	12	Did not advance	
Jacob Whittle	100 m freestyle	48.47	18	Did not advance			
Matt Richards	200 m freestyle	1.46.19	6 Q	1:45.63	7 Q	1:44.74	2nd place, silver medalist(s)
Duncan Scott	200 m freestyle	1.46.34	11 Q	1:44.94	2 Q	1:44.87	4
Kieran Bird	400 m freestyle	3:47.54	16	—N/a		Did not advance	
Daniel Jervis	1500 m freestyle	15:03.75	15	—N/a		Did not advance	
Oliver Morgan	100 m backstroke	53.44	11 Q	52.85	7 Q	52.84	8
Jonathon Marshall	100 m backstroke	53.93	16 Q	53.46	14	Did not advance	
Oliver Morgan	200 m backstroke	1:57.56	12 Q	1:57.28	12	Did not advance	
Luke Greenbank	200 m backstroke	DSQ	–	Did not advance			
Adam Peaty	100 m breaststroke	59.18	2 Q	58.86	1 Q	59.05	2nd place, silver medalist(s)
James Wilby	100 m breaststroke	59.40	6 Q	59.49	11	Did not advance	
James Guy	100 m butterfly	52.23	23	Did not advance			
Duncan Scott	200 m individual medley	1:57.77	2 Q	1:56.49	3 Q	1:55.31	2nd place, silver medalist(s)
Tom Dean	200 m individual medley	1:58.30	=7 Q	1:56.92	6 Q	1:56.46	5
Max Litchfield	400 m individual medley	4.09.51	2 Q	—N/a		4:08.85 NR	4
Matt Richards; Jacob Whittle; Tom Dean; Duncan Scott; Alexander Cohoon	4 × 100 m freestyle relay	3:12.49	3 Q	—N/a		3:11.61	5
James Guy; Tom Dean; Matt Richards; Duncan Scott; Kieran Bird; Jack McMillan	4 × 200 m freestyle relay	7:05.11	1 Q	—N/a		6:59.43	1st place, gold medalist(s)
Oliver Morgan; Adam Peaty; Joe Litchfield; Matt Richards	4 × 100 m medley relay	3:32.13	5 Q	—N/a		3:29.60	4
Hector Pardoe	10 km open water	—N/a				1:51:50.8	6
Tobias Robinson	10 km open water	—N/a				1:56:43.0	14

Qualifiers for the latter rounds (Q) of all events were decided on a time only basis, therefore positions shown are overall results versus competitors in all heats.

Women

Athlete	Event	Heat		Semifinal		Final	
Athlete	Event	Time	Rank	Time	Rank	Time	Rank
Anna Hopkin	50 m freestyle	24.72	15 Q	24.50	10	Did not advance	
Anna Hopkin	100 m freestyle	53.67	10 Q	53.74	11	Did not advance	
Kathleen Dawson	100 m backstroke	1:00.69	18	Did not advance			
Medi Harris	100 m backstroke	1:00.85	19	Did not advance			
Honey Osrin	200 m backstroke	2:09.57	5 Q	2:07.84	3 Q	2:08.16	7
Katie Shanahan	200 m backstroke	2:09.92	11 Q	2:08.52	7 Q	2:07.53	5
Angharad Evans	100 m breaststroke	1:06.38	12 Q	1:05.99	6 Q	1:05.85	6
Keanna Macinnes	100 m butterfly	57.90	16 Q	58.11	16	Did not advance	
Keanna Macinnes	200 m butterfly	2:08.46	7 Q	2:08.04	9	Did not advance	
Laura Stephens	200 m butterfly	2:10.46	14 Q	2:07.53	8 Q	2:08.82	8
Abbie Wood	200 m individual medley	2:10.95	7 Q	2:09.64	4 Q	2:09.51	5
Freya Colbert	200 m individual medley	2:12.88	=18	Did not advance			
Freya Colbert	400 m individual medley	4:37.62	4 Q	—N/a		4:35.67	4
Katie Shanahan	400 m individual medley	4:40.40	8 Q	—N/a		4:40.17	7
Anna Hopkin; Eva Okaro; Lucy Hope; Freya Anderson	4 × 100 m freestyle relay	3:36.13	7 Q	—N/a		3:35.25	7
Freya Colbert; Abbie Wood; Freya Anderson; Lucy Hope Medi Harris	4 × 200 m freestyle relay	7:53.49	7 Q	—N/a		7:48.23	5
Kathleen Dawson; Angharad Evans; Keanna Macinnes; Anna Hopkin	4 × 100 m medley relay	3:58.34	10	—N/a		Did not advance	
Leah Crisp	10 km open water	—N/a				2:07:46.7	20

Qualifiers for the latter rounds (Q) of all events were decided on a time only basis, therefore positions shown are overall results versus competitors in all heats.

Mixed

Athlete	Event	Heat		Final	
Athlete	Event	Time	Rank	Time	Rank
Kathleen Dawson; James Wilby; Duncan Scott; Anna Hopkin; Joe Litchfield (heat)	4 × 100 m mixed medley relay	3:43.73	5 Q	3:44.31	7

Qualifiers for the latter rounds (Q) of all events were decided on a time only basis, therefore positions shown are overall results versus competitors in all heats.

== Table tennis ==
Great Britain qualified two athletes for the table tennis competition at the Games. Anna Hursey won the first of the five available spots for women's singles quotas through the 2024 European Qualification Tournament in Sarajevo, Bosnia and Herzegovina. Liam Pitchford won a men's quota by virtue of the final world ranking for the Olympics. Hursey and Pitchford had their places officially confirmed by Team GB on 2 July 2024.

Athlete	Event	Preliminary	Round 1	Round 2	Round of 16	Quarterfinals	Semifinals	Final / BM	
Athlete	Event	Opposition Result	Opposition Result	Opposition Result	Opposition Result	Opposition Result	Opposition Result	Opposition Result	Rank
Liam Pitchford	Men's singles	Bye	Wu (FIJ); W 4–0	Jorgić (SLO); L 2–4	Did not advance				
Anna Hursey	Women's singles	Bye	Batra (IND); L 1–4	Did not advance					

== Taekwondo ==
Great Britain qualified four athletes by virtue of finishing in the top five in the Olympic rankings in their respective events. They included two-time Olympic champion Jade Jones and Tokyo 2020 silver medallist Bradly Sinden. The team was formally announced on 30 June 2024, confirming the selection of Rebecca McGowan over former world champion Bianca Cook

Athlete	Event	Round of 16	Quarterfinals	Semifinals	Repechage	Final / BM	
Athlete	Event	Opposition Result	Opposition Result	Opposition Result	Opposition Result	Opposition Result	Rank
Bradly Sinden	Men's −68 kg	Kassman (PNG); W 12–0, 15–3	Golubić (CRO); W 8–6, 9–11, 18–10	Kareem (JOR); L 2–1, 2–4, 2–10	Bye	Liang (CHN); L WDR	5=
Caden Cunningham	Men's +80 kg	Issoufou (NIG); W 6–5, 0–0 WSU	Alba (CUB); W 0–0 WSU, 0–4, 4–2	Cissé (CIV); W 11–6, 5–7, 5–5 WSU	Bye	Salimi (IRI); L 6–3, 1–9, 3–6	2nd place, silver medalist(s)
Jade Jones	Women's −57 kg	Reljiḱ (MKD); L 6–7, 5–4, 1–1 LSU	Did not advance				11=
Rebecca McGowan	Women's +67 kg	Traill (FIJ); W 13–0, 13–0	Osipova (UZB); L 6–14, 2–14	Bye	Bathily (CIV); W 1–0, 2–0	Kuş (TUR); L 9–7, 2–4, 2–6	5=

== Tennis ==
At the conclusion of the 2024 French Open, which marked the end of the Olympic ranking period, Great Britain had five tennis players in ranking positions; Jack Draper, Dan Evans and Cameron Norrie in men's singles, Joe Salisbury in men's doubles and Katie Boulter in women's singles. Two time champion Andy Murray received one of two invitational places available from the ITF. Emma Raducanu was also offered an invitational place but declined to accept it. Murray later withdrew from the singles. Norrie also pulled out just hours before his first round match due to an injury.

The British Olympic Association announced on 16 June that Neal Skupski would also compete in men's doubles with Salisbury. Further singles quotas and doubles pairings may be available dependent on withdrawals and combined rankings. Evans/Murray, Boulter/Heather Watson and Harriet Dart/Maia Lumsden have been nominated for additional places; of these pairings, Boulter and Watson are guaranteed selection on their 'combined ranking' as it is within the top 24 doubles pair combinations possible, while others will depend on nominations and withdrawals from other NOCs. Final entries will be confirmed on 4 July apart from the mixed doubles which will be determined on 24 July once the Games have begun.

Men

Athlete	Event	Round of 64	Round of 32	Round of 16	Quarterfinals	Semifinals	Final / BM
Athlete	Event	Opposition Score	Opposition Score	Opposition Score	Opposition Score	Opposition Score	Opposition Score
Jack Draper	Singles	Nishikori (JPN); W 6–1, 6–4	Fritz (USA); L 7–6^{(7–3)}, 3–6, 2–6	Did not advance			
Daniel Evans	Singles	Echargui (TUN); W 6–2, 4–6, 6–2	S. Tsitsipas (GRE); L 1–6, 2–6	Did not advance			
Joe Salisbury; Neal Skupski	Doubles	—N/a	Macháč / Pavlásek (CZE); L 6–4, 3–6, [8–10]	Did not advance			
Andy Murray; Daniel Evans	Doubles	—N/a	Daniel / Nishikori (JPN); W 2–6, 7–6^{(7–5)}, [11–9]	Gillé / Vliegen (BEL); W 6–3, 6–7^{(8–10)}, [11–9]	Fritz / Paul (USA); L 2–6, 4–6	Did not advance	

Women

Athlete	Event	Round of 64	Round of 32	Round of 16	Quarterfinals	Semifinals	Final / BM	
Athlete	Event	Opposition Score	Opposition Score	Opposition Score	Opposition Score	Opposition Score	Opposition Score	Rank
Katie Boulter	Singles	Schmiedlová (SVK); L 4–6, 2–6	Did not advance					
Katie Boulter; Heather Watson	Doubles	—N/a	Kerber / Siegemund (GER); W 6–2, 6–3	Haddad Maia / Stefani (BRA); W 6–3, 6–4	Errani / Paolini (ITA); L 3–6, 1–6	Did not advance		

Mixed

Athlete	Event	Round of 16	Quarterfinals	Semifinals	Final / BM	
Athlete	Event	Opposition Score	Opposition Score	Opposition Score	Opposition Score	Rank
Joe Salisbury; Heather Watson	Doubles	Dabrowski / Auger-Aliassime (CAN); L 5–7, 6–4, [3–10]	Did not advance			

== Triathlon ==
Great Britain confirmed four quota places (two per gender) in the triathlon events for Paris, after finishing second behind the host nation France at the 2022 Mixed Relay World Championships in Montreal, Canada. On 18 August 2023, Alex Yee, the Tokyo individual silver medallist, won the Paris test event, thus meeting the Team GB criteria for pre-selection and guaranteeing his place on the team. Yee and Beth Potter's selection for Paris was confirmed on 23 November 2023. A third women's berth, but not a men's third quota, was confirmed following the World Triathlon Championship Series event in Cagliari. As Great Britain have only two men's quotas, Alex Yee is the first of the triathletes also confirmed for the mixed relay. On 19 June, Team GB confirmed the final three triathletes, Sam Dickinson, Georgia Taylor-Brown and Kate Waugh. This confirmed Dickinson also in the relay as the only other male athlete.

Individual

Athlete	Event	Time						Rank
Athlete	Event	Swim (1.5 km)	Trans 1	Bike (40 km)	Trans 2	Run (10 km)	Total	Rank
Sam Dickinson	Men's	20:52	0:47	51:43	0:22	DNF		
Alex Yee	Men's	20:37	0:50	51:57	0:22	29:47	1:43:33	1st place, gold medalist(s)
Beth Potter	Women's	22:25	0:54	58:26	0:26	32:59	1:55:10	3rd place, bronze medalist(s)
Georgia Taylor-Brown	Women's	22:41	0:53	58:12	0:29	34:20	1:56:35	6
Kate Waugh	Women's	24:17	0:51	57:39	0:28	34:33	1:57:48	15

Relay

Athlete	Event	Time						Rank
Athlete	Event	Swim (300 m)	Trans 1	Bike (7 km)	Trans 2	Run (2 km)	Total group	Rank
Alex Yee	Mixed relay	4:13	1:04	9:36	0:26	4:44	20:03	3rd place, bronze medalist(s)
Georgia Taylor-Brown	Mixed relay	4:54	1:06	10:40	0:27	5:38	22:45	3rd place, bronze medalist(s)
Sam Dickinson	Mixed relay	4:22	1:01	9:39	0:24	4:58	20:18	3rd place, bronze medalist(s)
Beth Potter	Mixed relay	4:53	1:06	10:31	0:25	5:39	22:34	3rd place, bronze medalist(s)
Total	Mixed relay	—N/a					1:25:40	3rd place, bronze medalist(s)

== Weightlifting ==
Great Britain qualified one quota in weightlifting for Paris. The returning European +87 kg champion and Olympic silver medallist Emily Campbell qualified for the games, through the IWF Olympics Qualification Rankings. Her place was officially confirmed by Team GB on 6 June 2024.

Athlete	Event	Snatch		Clean & Jerk		Total	Rank
Athlete	Event	Result	Rank	Result	Rank	Total	Rank
Emily Campbell	Women's +81 kg	126	3	162	3	288	3rd place, bronze medalist(s)

== Sports Not Contested By Great Britain In Paris ==
=== Basketball ===
Neither of the men's or women's teams managed to qualify for the full-court tournament. The men's team made it through the first qualifying round for the FIBA Basketball World Cup finishing in 3rd position before being eliminated in the second round in last place. The women's team finished 10th at EuroBasket Women 2023 therefore ending their chances to qualify for the Olympics.

Both the men's and women's sides failed to qualify for the 3x3 events.

=== Breaking ===
Team GB failed to qualify any B-Boys or B-Girls for the Olympics through the Olympic Qualifier Series' in Shanghai and Budapest.

=== Fencing ===
Great Britain failed to qualify any fencers through qualifying tournaments or official rankings.

=== Football ===
The men's England side won the 2023 UEFA European Under-21 Championship. However, as no decision could be agreed between the four home nations consisting of England, Scotland, Wales and Northern Ireland because of concerns around playing in future competitions, no team was sent with their place being redistributed to Ukraine.

The women's side is represented in qualification by England after an agreement was reached between the four home nations to send a team if England, nominated by the home nations as the highest ranked football nation of the four. meet the requirements to qualify. England failed to do this, finishing in second place behind the Netherlands on the same points but having a lower goal scored total in their UEFA Women's Nations League 2023-24 group, therefore ending GB hopes of qualifying for the Olympics.

=== Handball ===
Team GB did not enter any handball teams for qualification to the Olympics.

=== Surfing ===
Great Britain failed to qualify any surfers for the Olympics at the ISA World Surfing Games in 2022, 2023 or 2024 or through the 2023 World Surf League.

=== Volleyball ===
Team GB did not enter any teams for either beach or inside volleyball.

=== Water Polo ===
A men's team was not entered to try and qualify for the 2022 Men's European Water Polo Championship, therefore ending their chances of qualifying for the Olympics. The women's side failed to qualify for the Olympics finishing in 11th at the 2024 World Aquatics Championships.

=== Wrestling ===
Great Britain failed to qualify any wrestlers for the Olympics after not qualifying any wrestlers for the 2024 European Wrestling Olympic Qualification Tournament.

== See also ==
- Great Britain at the Olympics
- Great Britain at the 2024 Winter Youth Olympics
- Great Britain at the 2024 Summer Paralympics
