= Hector Pardoe =

British swimmer (born 2001)

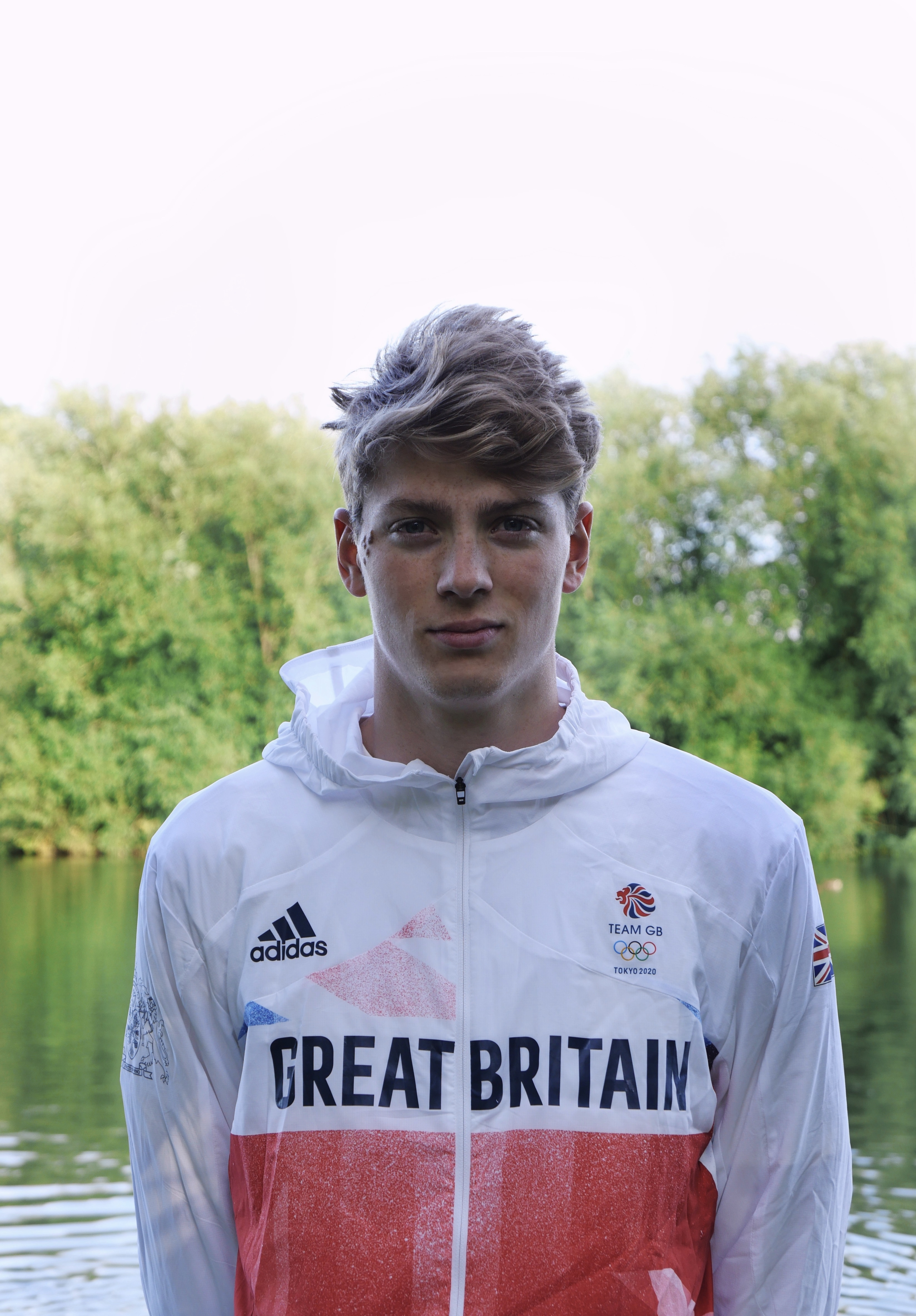

Personal information
- Full name: Hector Thomas Cheal Pardoe
- Nationality: British
- Born: 29 March 2001 (age 25) Wrexham, Wales
- Height: 193 cm (6 ft 4 in)
- Weight: 77 kg (170 lb)

Sport
- Sport: Swimming
- Event: Marathon swimming
Medal record
Men's swimming
Representing Great Britain
World Championships
Bronze medal – third place	2024 Doha	10 km open water

Hector Thomas Cheal Pardoe (born 29 March 2001) is a British swimmer. Specialising in distance and open water events, he is the 2024 bronze medalist in the World Aquatics Championships 10 km open water race, the first British male swimmer to win a World Championship open water swimming medal in Olympic distance, 10km, since Welsh Compatriot, David Davies back in 2008.

Pardoe is also the current record holder for England's largest lake, Lake Windermere, in which he beat the 26-year-old record, by 8 minutes. Pardoe set the record at 3 hours 40 minutes and 28 seconds. In the ultra-marathon swimming scene, Hector holds the British record for the 25,000m, set in October 2020 at the French Open Water Championships in Jablines, finishing in 4 hours, 59 minutes, and 15 seconds.

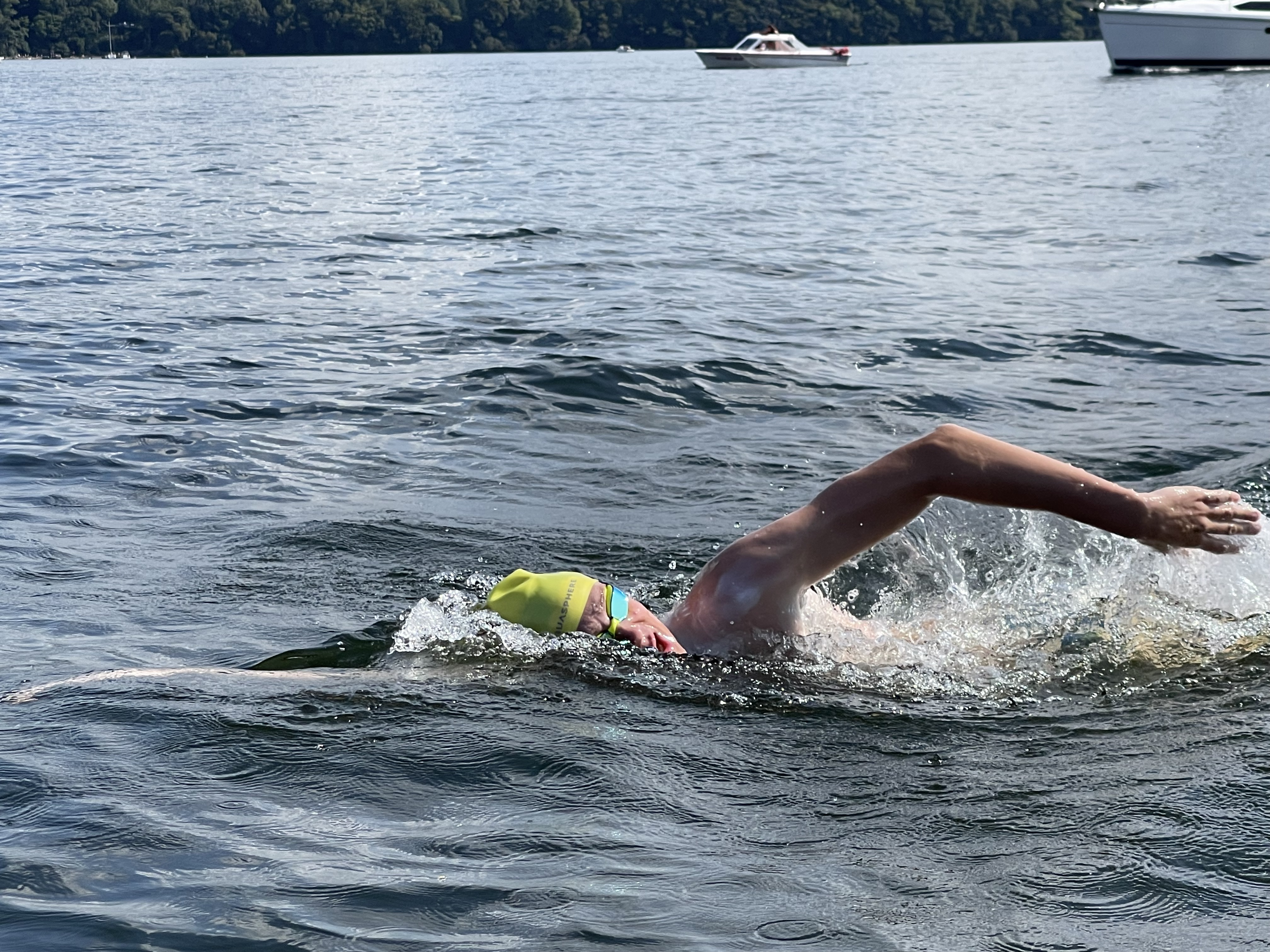
Lake Windermere end to end swim.

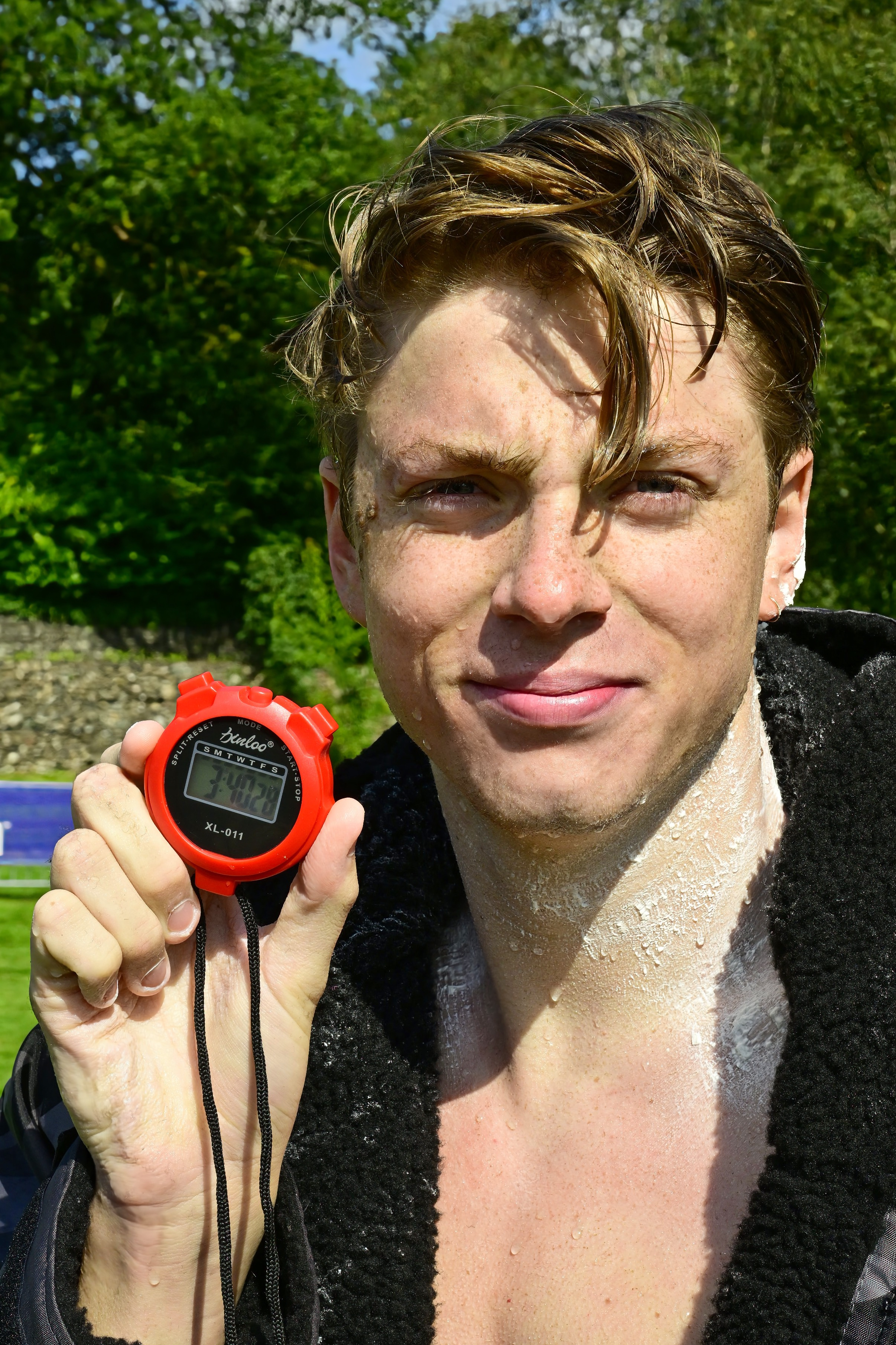
Pardoe with stopwatch after breaking Lake Windermere World Record.

== Swimming career and achievements ==
Pardoe became the first British swimmer to win a medal at the World Junior Open Water Championships when he won bronze in the individual 5 km in 2016. Hector also lead off the Bronze medal winning GB relay team at the same World Junior Championships.

In 2018, Pardoe finished 2nd at the Great North swim elite race held in Lake Windermere, which served as British swimmings selection for the Glasgow LEN European Championships. This selection made him the youngest British Open Water Swimmer to represent Britain at a Europeans.

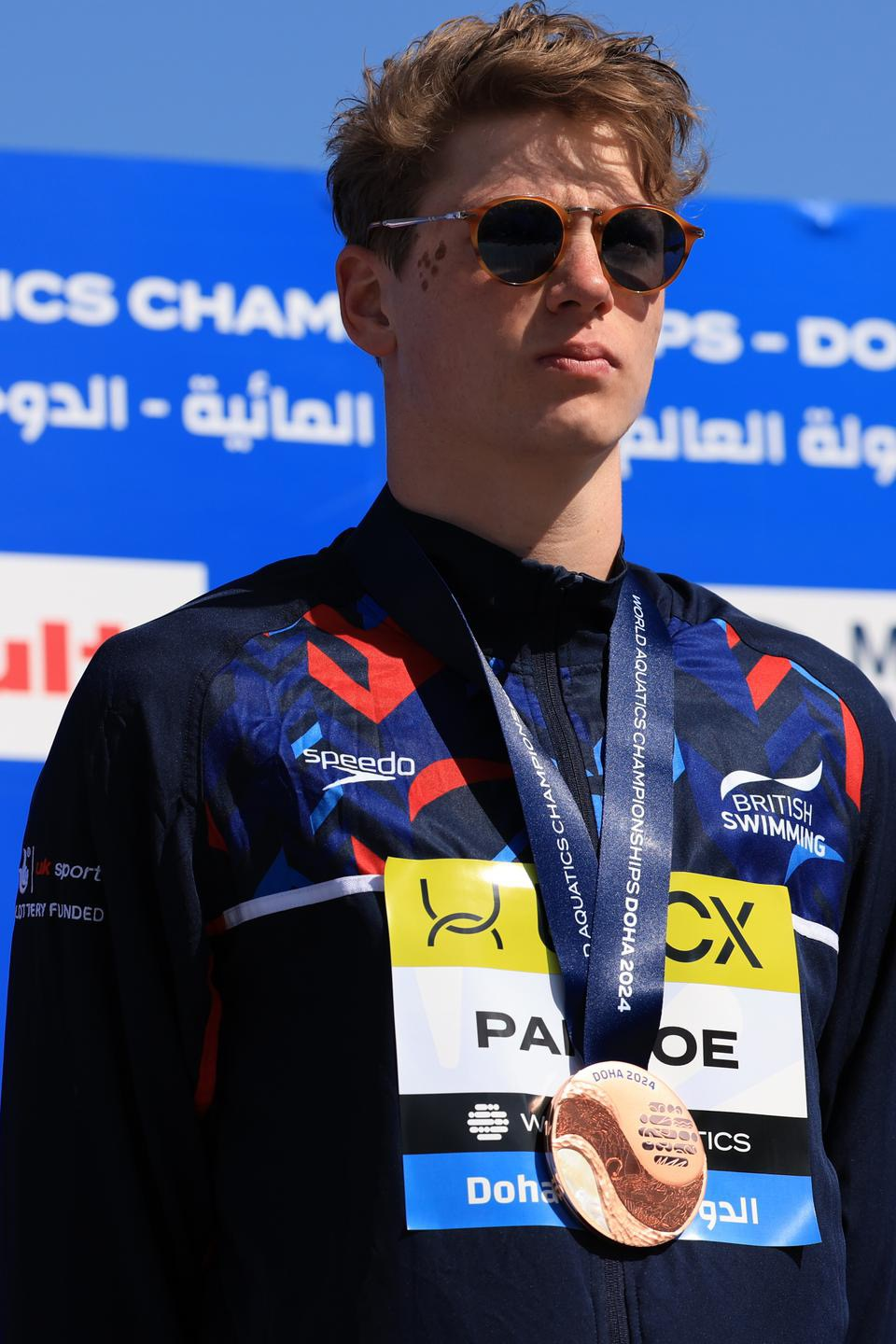
World Aquatic World Championships 2024 podium Mens 10km.

In 2020, Pardoe finished 10th in the overall FINA Marathon Swim World Series. Later in 2020, he broke a British marathon swimming record by going under five hours for a 25,000-metre open water swim, at the French National Open Water Championships held in Jablines, France in a time of 4 hours 59 minutes and 3 seconds.

In 2021, Pardoe made his Olympic debut in Tokyo at 20 years old. He qualified for Tokyo by winning the 2021 World Aquatic Olympic Qualifier in Setubal, Portugal, but was forced to retire from the Tokyo Olympic race due to an elbow to his eye. Pardoe ended the year by finishing 9th in the Grand Final of the 2021 FINA Marathon Swim World Series in Abu Dhabi, resulting in an overall 8th place position in the 2021 FINA World Marathon Series.

In 2022, Pardoe competed in the 2022 World Aquatics Championships held in Budapest where he finished 11th in the mens 10 km marathon. He also represented Great Britain at the LEN European Championships held in Ostia, Rome.

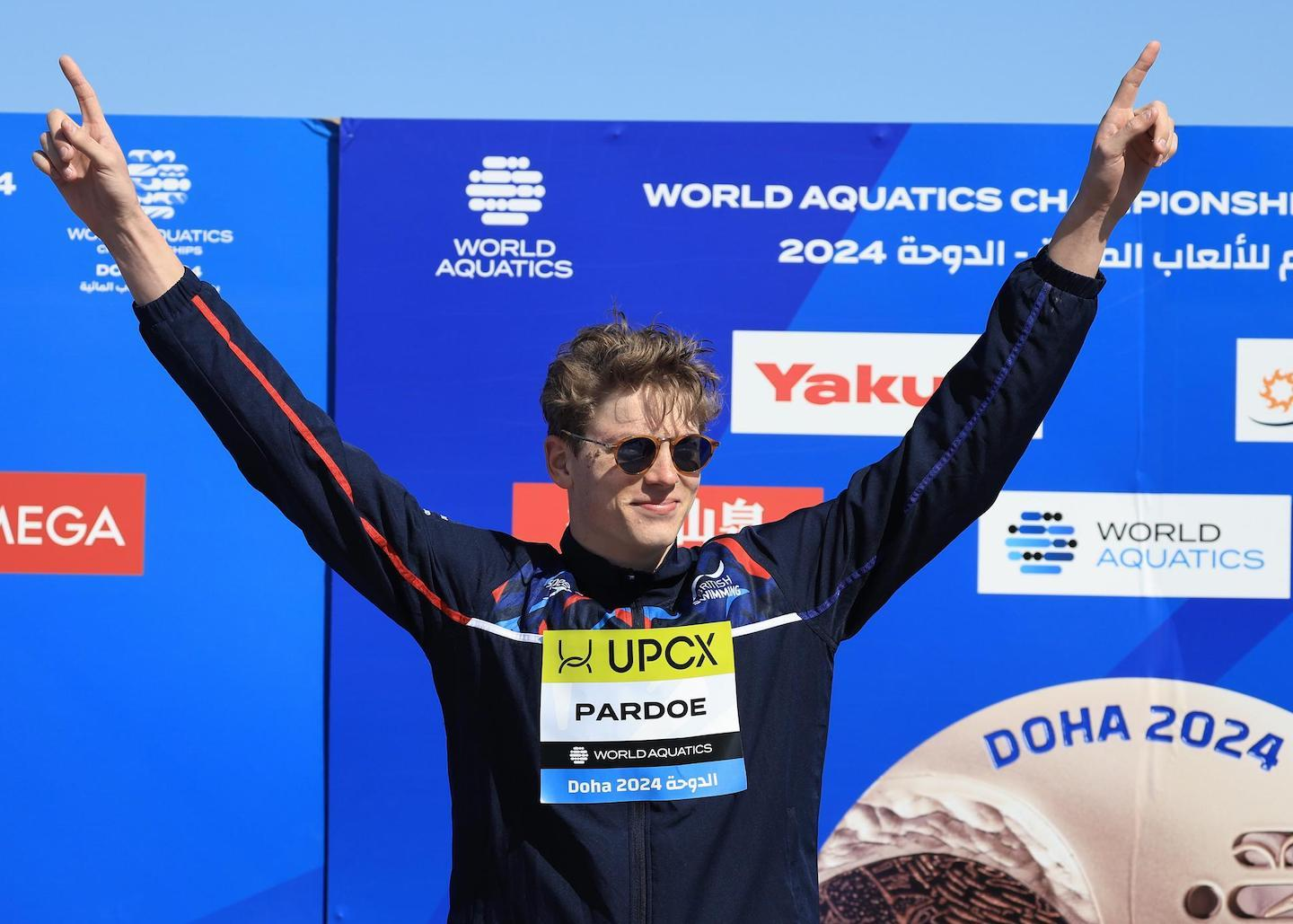
Pardoe receiving World bronze medal Mens Marathon swimming event at the World Aquatics Championships 2024 held in Doha, Qatar.

In 2023, Pardoe finished 10th in the Mens marathon 10 kilometre event at the 2023 World Aquatics World Championships held in Fukuoka, Japan, securing him qualification for the 2024 World Aquatics Championships and Olympic qualifier set to be held in Doha, Qatar.

At the 2024 Summer Olympics, Pardoe finished sixth in the 10 km open water swimming marathon.

In August 2025, Pardoe became the first person to swim the largest lakes in England, Scotland and Wales within a 24 hour timeframe, swimming the lengths of Lake Windermere, Loch Lomond and Llyn Tegid (Lake Bala) for a cumulative total of 55km (34 miles).

In September 2026, he was part of a relay team alongside Tom Dean, Joshua Gammon, George Taplin, Daniel Jervis, and Toby Robinson that set a new British record for swimming across the English Channel, taking 22 minutes off the previous best set by a Dover Lifeguard Club team in 1981.

== Personal life ==
Having trained at Ellesmere College in Shropshire, England, under the tutelage of Alan Bircher from age 11 to 18, in 2020 he moved from England to train and live in Montpellier, France to train with French Coach Phillipe Lucas. In 2022, Pardoe moved back to the UK, where he now trains and studies business economics and finance at Loughborough University. Outside of swimming, Pardoe is a supporter of English football club, AFC Wimbledon and is vegetarian. Hector Pardoe was in a relationship with French triathlete Cassandre Beaugrand until late 2024. Pardoe was named athlete of the year at the 2025 BBC Green Sport Awards.
