= Rory Gibbs =

British rower (born 1994)

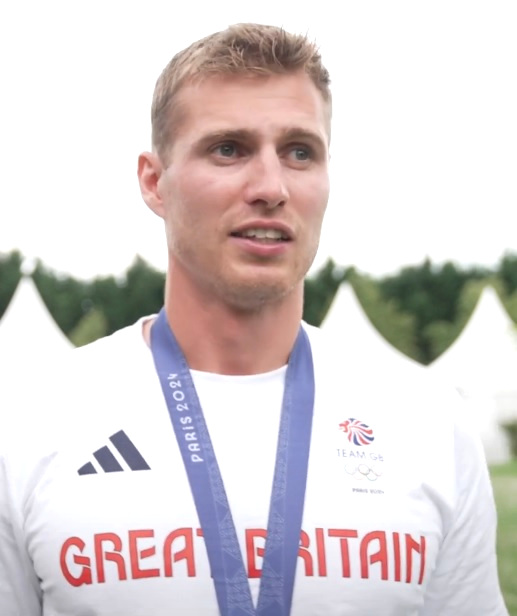
- Gibbs at the 2024 Summer Olympics

Personal information
- Nationality: British
- Born: 3 April 1994 (age 32)
- Height: 1.93 m (6 ft 4 in)

Sport
- Country: Great Britain
- Sport: Rowing
- Event: Coxless four
- Club: Oxford Brookes
Medal record
Men's rowing
Representing Great Britain
Olympic Games
| Gold medal – first place | 2024 Paris | Eight |
World Championships
| Gold medal – first place | 2022 Račice | Eight |
| Gold medal – first place | 2023 Belgrade | Eight |
| Bronze medal – third place | 2019 Ottensheim | Coxless four |
European Championships
| Gold medal – first place | 2019 Lucerne | Coxless four |
| Gold medal – first place | 2021 Varese | Coxless four |
| Gold medal – first place | 2022 Oberschleißheim | Eight |
| Gold medal – first place | 2023 Bled | Eight |
| Gold medal – first place | 2024 Szeged | Eight |

Rory Gibbs (born 3 April 1994) is a British representative rower - an Olympic and a two-time world champion. He won the 2022 and 2023 world championship titles in the British men's eight. Between 2016 and 2023 he rowed in victorious crews across six events at the Henley Royal Regatta.

== University rowing ==
Gibbs took up rowing after picking up injuries playing rugby. He was educated at Millfield School and Oxford Brookes university where he was a relative late starter in taking up rowing.

Racing for Oxford Brookes, Gibbs enjoyed an incredible run of victories at the Henley Royal Regatta as he proceeded through his developmental stages - in 2016 a victory in the Temple Challenge Cup (for university eights); in 2017 & 2018 victory in the Ladies' Challenge Plate (for club and university eights below international standard); in 2019 the Stewards' Challenge Cup (for club and university coxless fours). In 2022, he won the Grand Challenge Cup (the blue riband event at Henley) in the bow of a composite Leander/Oxford Brookes crew. In 2023 again in Oxford Brookes colours, he was at five in the Leander/Oxford Brookes eight for another Grand Challenge Cup victory.

== Representative career ==
Gibbs first made national selection for Great Britain into the U23 men's eight for the 2015 U23 World Rowing Championships in Plovdiv. That crew rowed to a fifth placing. In 2016 Gibbs was selected to the British coxed four for the U23 World Championships and another overall fifth placing.

2019 saw Gibbs selected into the Great Britain men's senior squad and medal success soon followed. He won a gold medal in the coxless four at the 2019 European Rowing Championships with Oliver Cook, Matthew Rossiter and Sholto Carnegie then that same crew won a bronze medal at the 2019 World Rowing Championships.

That crew of Gibbs, Cook, Rossiter and Carnegie stayed together throughout the Covid lost season of 2020 whilst knowing their 2019 performances had qualified the boat for the eventual 2020 Tokyo Olympics. In 2021, they won a second European gold medal as a 4- in Varese, Italy, then took gold at the World Rowing Cup II. At the Tokyo Olympic regatta they won their heat, comfortably beating the eventual bronze medallists Italy. In the Olympic final they were in medal contention at each mark but were run down by the Italians in the last 500m and finished in fourth place.

2022 saw Gibbs selected in the bow seat of the Great Britain senior men's eight. In that international season the eight won gold at two World Rowing Cups and at the 2022 European Rowing Championships. Gibbs in the British eight went on to win gold and a world championship title at the 2022 World Rowing Championships in Račice. In 2023 Gibbs won a second successive world championship in the men's eight at the 2023 World Rowing Championships in Belgrade.

He won a gold medal as part of the Great Britain eight at the 2024 Summer Olympics.
