= Thomas Digby (rower) =

British rower (born 1998)

Tom Digby
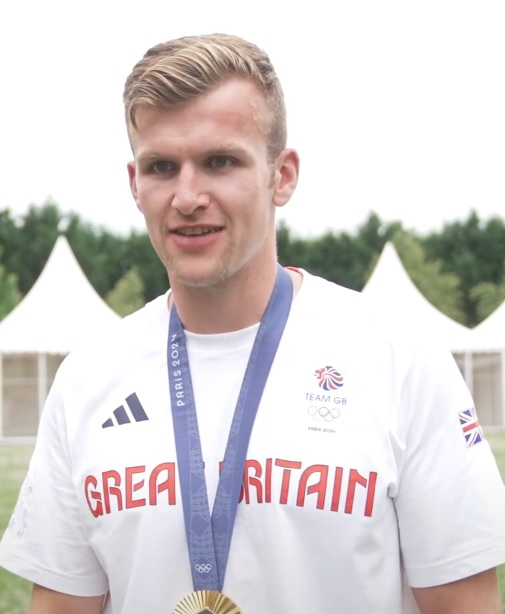
- Digby at the 2024 Summer Olympics

Personal information
- Full name: Thomas William Kenelm Digby
- Nationality: British
- Born: 23 July 1998 (age 28) Henley-on-Thames, England

Sport
- Country: Great Britain
- Sport: Rowing
- Event: Eights
- Club: Oxford Brookes
Medal record
Men's rowing
Representing Great Britain
Olympic Games
Gold medal – first place	2024 Paris	Eight
World Championships
Gold medal – first place	2022 Račice	Eight
Gold medal – first place	2023 Belgrade	Eight
European Championships
Gold medal – first place	2022 Oberschleißheim	Eight
Gold medal – first place	2023 Bled	Eight
Gold medal – first place	2024 Szeged	Eight

Thomas William Kenelm Digby (born 23 July 1998) is a British national representative rower. He is an Olympic and two-time world champion.

== School, varsity & club rowing ==
Raised in Henley-on-Thames, Digby was introduced to rowing at the Upper Thames Rowing Club. He attended Abingdon School where he gained colours in rowing and was the captain of the eights for the Abingdon School Boat Club. Whilst still at school he set national age records on the ergometer, won national indoor rowing competitions and ultimately made selection to the GB junior representative squad in all three of his senior school years. After leaving Abingdon in 2016 he attended Yale University where he rowed in the Yale senior 1st eight for three successive inter-collegiate racing seasons.

Digby's senior club rowing has been from the Oxford Brookes University Boat Club. In 2023, he won his third consecutive Grand Challenge Cup (the blue riband event at the Henley Royal Regatta) rowing for Oxford Brookes.

== International representative career ==
Digby first achieved national selection for Great Britain while still a schoolboy when selected in a junior coxed four to race at the 2014 Junior World Rowing Championships. Rowing in that crew with his Yale and future world champion crewmate Charles Elwes, Digby won a silver medal. Elwes & Digby stayed in that crew for the 2015 Junior World Championships and won another silver. At the 2016 Junior World Championships Digby rowed in the British quad scull which finished in overall 11th place.

In 2017 Digby moved into the Great Britain U23 representative squad. He raced and achieved podium finishes at three successive U23 World Rowing Championships - silver in the 4- in 2017; silver in the 8+ in 2018 and gold in the 4- in 2019.

2022 saw Digby selected to the six seat of the Great Britain senior men's eight. In that international season the eight won gold at two World Rowing Cups and at the 2022 European Rowing Championships. Digby in the British eight went on to win gold and a world championship title at the 2022 World Rowing Championships in Račice. In 2023 Digby won a second successive world championship in the men's eight at the 2023 World Rowing Championships in Belgrade.

He won a gold medal as part of the Great Britain eight at the 2024 Summer Olympics.

== See also ==
- List of Old Abingdonians
