= Charles Elwes =

British rower (born 1997)

Charlie Elwes
Personal information
- Full name: Charles Richard Jeremy Elwes
- Born: 15 July 1997 (age 29) Randburg, South Africa
- Height: 1.99 m (6 ft 6 in)

Sport
- Country: Great Britain
- Sport: Rowing
- Club: Leander Club
Medal record
Men's rowing
Representing Great Britain
Olympic Games
Gold medal – first place	2024 Paris	Eight
Bronze medal – third place	2020 Tokyo	Eight
World Championships
Gold medal – first place	2022 Račice	Eight
Gold medal – first place	2023 Belgrade	Eight
European Championships
Gold medal – first place	2021 Varese	Eight
Gold medal – first place	2022 Oberschleißheim	Eight
Gold medal – first place	2023 Bled	Eight
Gold medal – first place	2024 Szeged	Eight

Charles Richard Jeremy Elwes (born 15 July 1997) is a British national representative rower. He is an Olympic and two-time world champion.

== School, varsity & club rowing ==
Elwes was educated at Radley College where he took up rowing. He then attended Yale University where he rowed in the Yale senior 1st eight in 2015/16 and 2016/17 inter-collegiate racing seasons. His senior club rowing in England has been from the Leander Club.

After Yale, Elwes went up to Oxford to study medical ethics. He rowed at six in the Oxford crew which won The Boat Race 2022. Also in 2022, he won the Grand Challenge Cup (the blue riband event at the Henley Royal Regatta), rowing for Leander.

== International representative career ==
Elwes first achieved national selection for Great Britain while still a schoolboy when selected in a junior coxed four to race at the 2013 Junior World Rowing Championships. In 2014 he was again selected in the GB junior men's 4+ and racing in that crew with his Yale and future world champion crewmate Thomas Digby, Elwes won a silver medal at the Junior World Championships. Elwes & Digby stayed in that crew for the 2015 Junior World Championships and won another silver as a coxless four.

In 2017 Elwes moved into the Great Britain U23 representative squad. In the GB U23 coxless four he achieved podium finishes at three successive U23 World Rowing Championships - silver in 2017; silver in 2018 and gold (and an U23 world championship title) in 2019.

2021 saw Elwes selected in the five seat of the Great Britain senior men's eight. They won a European championship gold medal in Varese, Italy and won at the World Rowing Cup II. At the delayed 2020 Summer Olympics in Tokyo, Elwes won Olympic bronze in the British men's eight.

2022 saw Elwes retain the five seat in the Great Britain men's eight. In that international season the crew won gold at two World Rowing Cups and at the European Rowing Championships. Elwes in the that boat went on to win gold and a world championship title at the 2022 World Rowing Championships in Račice. The following year in 2023, he won a second successive world championship gold medal in the men's eight at the 2023 World Rowing Championships in Belgrade.

He won a gold medal as part of the Great Britain eight at the 2024 Summer Olympics.
