= List of archers at the 2020 Summer Olympics =

The list shown below is showing the archers who competed at the 2020 Summer Olympics in Tokyo, Japan. The archers played in a set of 5 events: Men's Individual, Team; Womenʻs Individual, Team; and the Mixed Team.

65 archers made their Olympic debuts in Tokyo. Meanwhile, Evangelia Psarra qualified for her sixth Olympic games.

== Male archers ==
NOC	Name	Age	Olympic app.
Australia	David Barnes	February 22, 1986 (aged 35)	2nd
Australia	Ryan Tyack	June 2, 1991 (aged 30)	2nd
Australia	Taylor Worth	January 8, 1991 (aged 30)	3rd
Bangladesh	Ruman Shana	June 8, 1995 (aged 26)	Debut
Belgium	Jarno De Smedt	June 4, 2000 (aged 21)	Debut
Brazil	Marcus D'Almeida	January 30, 1998 (aged 23)	2nd
Canada	Crispin Duenas	January 5, 1986 (aged 35)	4th
Chile	Andrés Aguilar	December 7, 1996 (aged 24)	Debut
China	Li Jialun	January 13, 1993 (aged 28)	Debut
China	Wang Dapeng	December 3, 1996 (aged 24)	2nd
China	Wei Shaoxuan	November 22, 2000 (aged 20)	Debut
Colombia	Daniel Pineda	November 5, 1993 (aged 27)	2nd
Egypt	Youssof Tolba	January 30, 2001 (aged 20)	Debut
Finland	Antti Vikström	January 15, 1993 (aged 28)	Debut
France	Thomas Chirault	September 15, 1997 (aged 23)	Debut
France	Jean-Charles Valladont	March 20, 1989 (aged 32)	2nd
France	Pierre Plihon	October 29, 1989 (aged 31)	2nd
Germany	Florian Unruh	June 7, 1993 (aged 28)	Debut
Great Britain	Tom Hall	September 17, 1990 (aged 30)	Debut
Great Britain	Patrick Huston	January 5, 1996 (aged 25)	2nd
Great Britain	James Woodgate	May 29, 2002 (aged 19)	Debut
India	Atanu Das	April 5, 1992 (aged 29)	2nd
India	Pravin Jadhav	July 6, 1996 (aged 25)	Debut
India	Tarundeep Rai	February 22, 1984 (aged 37)	3rd
Indonesia	Riau Ega Agatha	November 25, 1991 (aged 29)	2nd
Indonesia	Arif Dwi Pangestu	March 25, 2004 (aged 17)	Debut
Indonesia	Alviyanto Prastyadi	February 18, 2002 (aged 19)	Debut
Iran	Milad Vaziri	June 9, 1988 (aged 33)	2nd
Israel	Itay Shanny	September 1, 1998 (aged 22)	Debut
Italy	Mauro Nespoli	November 22, 1987 (aged 33)	4th
Japan	Takaharu Furukawa	August 9, 1984 (aged 36)	5th
Japan	Yuki Kawata	June 16, 1997 (aged 24)	Debut
Japan	Hiroki Muto	June 26, 1997 (aged 24)	Debut
Kazakhstan	Ilfat Abdullin	January 9, 1998 (aged 23)	Debut
Kazakhstan	Denis Gankin	December 13, 1989 (aged 31)	2nd
Kazakhstan	Sanzhar Mussayev	April 11, 1996 (aged 25)	Debut
Luxembourg	Jeff Henckels	August 30, 1984 (aged 36)	3rd
Malaysia	Khairul Anuar Mohamad	September 22, 1991 (aged 29)	3rd
Malawi	Areneo David	February 25, 1998 (aged 23)	2nd
Mexico	Luis Álvarez	April 13, 1991 (aged 30)	2nd
Moldova	Dan Olaru	November 11, 1996 (aged 24)	2nd
Mongolia	Baatarkhuyagiin Otgonbold	December 20, 1996 (aged 24)	Debut
Netherlands	Gijs Broeksma	December 10, 1999 (aged 21)	Debut
Netherlands	Sjef van den Berg	April 14, 1995 (aged 26)	2nd
Netherlands	Steve Wijler	September 19, 1996 (aged 24)	Debut
Poland	Sławomir Napłoszek	July 29, 1968 (aged 52)	2nd
ROC	Galsan Bazarzhapov	November 1, 1994 (aged 26)	Debut
Slovenia	Žiga Ravnikar	December 25, 1999 (aged 21)	Debut
South Korea	Kim Je-deok	April 12, 2004 (aged 17)	Debut
South Korea	Oh Jin-hyek	August 15, 1981 (aged 39)	2nd
South Korea	Kim Woo-jin	June 20, 1992 (aged 29)	2nd
Spain	Daniel Castro	April 19, 1997 (aged 24)	Debut
Chinese Taipei	Deng Yu-cheng	April 25, 1999 (aged 22)	Debut
Chinese Taipei	Tang Chih-chun	March 16, 2001 (aged 20)	Debut
Chinese Taipei	Wei Chun-heng	June 6, 1994 (aged 27)	2nd
Tunisia	Mohamed Hammed	September 23, 1987 (aged 33)	Debut
Turkey	Mete Gazoz	8 June 1999 (age 22)	2nd

== Female archers ==
NOC	Name	Age	Olympic app.
Australia	Alice Ingley	January 13, 1993 (aged 28)	2nd
Bangladesh	Diya Siddique	February 19, 2004 (aged 17)	Debut
Belarus	Hanna Marusava	January 8, 1978 (aged 43)	3rd
Belarus	Karyna Dziominskaya	August 25, 1994 (aged 26)	Debut
Belarus	Karyna Kazlouskaya	July 18, 2000 (aged 21)	Debut
Bhutan	Karma	June 6, 1990 (aged 31)	2nd
Brazil	Ane Marcelle dos Santos	January 12, 1994 (aged 27)	2nd
Canada	Stephanie Barrett	January 26, 1979 (aged 42)	Debut
Chad	Marlyse Hourtou	July 29, 1996 (aged 24)	Debut
China	Long Xiaoqing	February 27, 1997 (aged 24)	Debut
China	Wu Jiaxin	February 28, 1997 (aged 24)	2nd
China	Yang Xiaolei	June 28, 2000 (aged 21)	Debut
Chinese Taipei	Lei Chien-ying	April 17, 1990 (aged 31)	3rd
Chinese Taipei	Lin Chia-en	June 2, 1993 (aged 28)	2nd
Chinese Taipei	Tan Ya-ting	November 7, 1993 (aged 27)	3rd
Colombia	Valentina Acosta	April 20, 2000 (aged 21)	Debut
Czech Republic	Marie Horáčková	December 24, 1997 (aged 23)	Debut
Denmark	Maja Jager	December 22, 1991 (aged 29)	2nd
Ecuador	Adriana Espinosa de los Monteros	July 18, 1991 (aged 30)	Debut
Egypt	Amal Adam	December 24, 1981 (aged 39)	Debut
Estonia	Reena Pärnat	December 1, 1993 (aged 27)	2nd
France	Lisa Barbelin	April 20, 2000 (aged 21)	Debut
Germany	Charline Schwarz	January 15, 2001 (aged 20)	Debut
Germany	Lisa Unruh	April 12, 1988 (aged 33)	2nd
Germany	Michelle Kroppen	April 19, 1996 (aged 25)	Debut
Great Britain	Bryony Pitman	March 13, 1997 (aged 24)	Debut
Great Britain	Naomi Folkard	September 18, 1983 (aged 37)	5th
Great Britain	Sarah Bettles	October 16, 1992 (aged 28)	Debut
Greece	Evangelia Psarra	June 17, 1974 (aged 47)	6th
India	Deepika Kumari	June 13, 1994 (aged 27)	3rd
Indonesia	Diananda Choirunisa	March 16, 1997 (aged 24)	Debut
Italy	Chiara Rebagliati	January 23, 1997 (aged 24)	Debut
Italy	Lucilla Boari	March 24, 1997 (aged 24)	2nd
Italy	Tatiana Andreoli	January 1, 1999 (aged 22)	Debut
Japan	Azusa Yamauchi	September 11, 1998 (aged 22)	Debut
Japan	Miki Nakamura	September 12, 1992 (aged 28)	Debut
Japan	Ren Hayakawa	August 24, 1987 (aged 33)	2nd
Malaysia	Syaqiera Mashayikh	November 24, 2000 (aged 20)	Debut
Mexico	Aída Román	May 21, 1988 (aged 33)	4th
Mexico	Alejandra Valencia	October 17, 1994 (aged 26)	3rd
Mexico	Ana Paula Vázquez	November 5, 2000 (aged 20)	Debut
Moldova	Alexandra Mîrca	October 11, 1993 (aged 27)	2nd
Mongolia	Bishindeegiin Urantungalag	February 24, 1977 (aged 44)	2nd
Netherlands	Gabriela Schloesser	February 18, 1994 (aged 27)	2nd (competed for Mexico in 2016)
Poland	Sylwia Zyzańska	July 27, 1997 (aged 23)	Debut
ROC	Elena Osipova	May 22, 1993 (aged 28)	Debut
ROC	Ksenia Perova	February 8, 1989 (aged 32)	3rd
ROC	Svetlana Gomboeva	June 8, 1998 (aged 23)	Debut
Romania	Mădălina Amăistroaie	December 9, 2002 (aged 18)	Debut
Slovakia	Denisa Baránková	September 7, 2001 (aged 19)	Debut
South Korea	An San	February 27, 2001 (aged 20)	Debut
South Korea	Jang Min-hee	April 5, 1999 (aged 22)	Debut
South Korea	Kang Chae-young	June 8, 1996 (aged 25)	Debut
Spain	Inés de Velasco	March 14, 2002 (aged 19)	Debut
Sweden	Christine Bjerendal	February 3, 1987 (aged 34)	3rd
Tunisia	Rihab Elwalid	June 14, 1998 (aged 23)	Debut
Turkey	Yasemin Anagöz	October 14, 1998 (aged 22)	2nd
Ukraine	Anastasiia Pavlova	February 9, 1995 (aged 26)	2nd
Ukraine	Lidiia Sichenikova	February 3, 1993 (aged 28)	3rd
Ukraine	Veronika Marchenko	April 4, 1993 (aged 28)	2nd
United States	Casey Kaufhold	March 6, 2004 (aged 17)	Debut
United States	Jennifer Mucino-Fernandez	December 18, 2002 (aged 18)	Debut
United States	Mackenzie Brown	March 14, 1995 (aged 26)	2nd
Vietnam	Đỗ Thị Ánh Nguyệt	January 15, 2001 (aged 20)	Debut
