= Archery at the 2018 Asian Games – Men's individual recurve =

Men's individual recurve at the 2018 Asian Games
- Venue: Gelora Bung Karno Archery Field
- Dates: 21–28 August 2018
- Competitors: 79 from 27 nations

Medalists
gold medal	Kim Woo-jin	South Korea
silver medal	Lee Woo-seok	South Korea
bronze medal	Riau Ega Agata	Indonesia

The men's individual recurve archery competition at the 2018 Asian Games was held from 21 to 28 August at Gelora Bung Karno Archery Field.

A total of 79 archers participated in the ranking round. Only the top two archers from each country were allowed to progress to the knockout stage.

== Schedule ==
All times are Western Indonesia Time (UTC+07:00)

Date	Time	Event
Tuesday, 21 August 2018	14:20	Ranking round
Thursday, 23 August 2018	10:10	1/32 eliminations
Thursday, 23 August 2018	11:10	1/16 eliminations
Thursday, 23 August 2018	11:50	1/8 eliminations
Thursday, 23 August 2018	15:30	Quarterfinals
Thursday, 23 August 2018	16:50	Semifinals
Tuesday, 28 August 2018	10:10	Bronze medal match
Tuesday, 28 August 2018	10:30	Gold medal match

== Results ==
=== Ranking round ===
Rank	Seed	Athlete	Half		Total	10s	Xs
Rank	Seed	Athlete	1st	2nd	Total	10s	Xs
1	—	Oh Jin-hyek (KOR)	340	343	683	41	21
2	—	Im Dong-hyun (KOR)	336	343	679	39	12
3	3	Ruman Shana (BAN)	335	342	677	35	11
4	1	Lee Woo-seok (KOR)	334	341	675	36	15
5	4	Ilfat Abdullin (KAZ)	335	338	673	34	9
6	2	Kim Woo-jin (KOR)	338	334	672	31	11
7	5	Tang Chih-chun (TPE)	332	338	670	34	12
8	6	Denis Gankin (KAZ)	329	340	669	34	12
9	7	Takaharu Furukawa (JPN)	329	339	668	26	9
10	8	Wei Chun-heng (TPE)	334	333	667	35	11
11	9	Xu Tianyu (CHN)	341	325	666	27	8
12	—	Sanzhar Mussayev (KAZ)	334	326	660	34	7
13	10	Li Jialun (CHN)	331	329	660	29	7
14	11	Atanu Das (IND)	332	328	660	26	8
15	—	Sun Quan (CHN)	332	328	660	25	6
16	12	Khairul Anuar Mohamad (MAS)	331	327	658	26	12
17	13	Vishwas (IND)	328	330	658	26	10
18	14	Akmal Nor Hasrin (MAS)	322	335	657	28	8
19	15	Baatarkhuyagiin Otgonbold (MGL)	326	330	656	29	13
20	—	Wei Shaoxuan (CHN)	328	328	656	28	6
21	16	Chu Đức Anh (VIE)	331	324	655	27	8
22	—	Haziq Kamaruddin (MAS)	321	331	652	25	5
23	—	Zarif Syahir Zolkepeli (MAS)	326	325	651	23	6
24	—	Sultan Duzelbayev (KAZ)	328	323	651	22	8
25	17	Hoàng Văn Lộc (VIE)	326	324	650	25	12
26	—	Nguyễn Văn Duy (VIE)	328	322	650	24	5
27	—	Luo Wei-min (TPE)	319	330	649	28	8
28	18	Hiroki Muto (JPN)	327	322	649	25	7
29	19	Riau Ega Agata (INA)	328	321	649	21	9
30	—	Tomoaki Kuraya (JPN)	326	320	646	23	8
31	20	Bataagiin Pürevsüren (MGL)	326	320	646	21	10
32	—	Baasankhüügiin Adiyaasüren (MGL)	329	317	646	21	6
33	—	Jao Ting-yu (TPE)	322	323	645	23	8
34	21	Sadegh Ashrafi (IRI)	327	317	644	21	11
35	22	Pak Yong-won (PRK)	319	324	643	22	5
36	23	Ibrahim Sheik Rezowan (BAN)	320	323	643	19	9
37	24	Tilak Pun Magar (NEP)	324	317	641	22	8
38	—	Emdadul Haque Milon (BAN)	322	319	641	22	6
39	—	Jagdish Choudhary (IND)	314	324	638	19	7
40	25	Roshan Nagarkoti (NEP)	318	319	637	23	4
41	26	Tanapat Pathairat (THA)	317	320	637	16	6
42	27	Alek Edwar (INA)	323	313	636	23	9
43	28	Htike Lin Oo (MYA)	317	319	636	19	5
44	—	Mohammad Tamimul Islam (BAN)	320	315	635	15	6
45	29	Amin Pirali (IRI)	320	314	634	22	11
46	—	Sukhchain Singh (IND)	306	325	631	19	3
47	30	Witthaya Thamwong (THA)	323	307	630	18	7
48	—	Denchai Thepna (THA)	314	312	626	16	7
49	31	Tan Si Lie (SGP)	324	301	625	23	5
50	—	Okka Bagus Subekti (INA)	313	312	625	16	5
51	32	Ibrahim Al-Mohanadi (QAT)	308	315	623	18	1
52	—	Jantsangiin Gantögs (MGL)	307	316	623	17	8
53	33	Ma Hing Kin (HKG)	319	304	623	15	3
54	34	Ri Tae-bom (PRK)	312	310	622	17	2
55	35	Mansour Alwi (KSA)	309	312	621	13	2
56	36	Fares Al-Otaibi (KSA)	306	314	620	19	4
57	—	Kim Kuk-song (PRK)	313	305	618	17	8
58	—	Milad Vaziri (IRI)	305	311	616	20	5
59	37	Ulukbek Kursanaliev (KGZ)	307	309	616	15	6
60	38	Kinley Tshering (BHU)	301	314	615	10	0
61	39	Lee Kar Wai (HKG)	307	307	614	15	3
62	—	Abdalelah Binali (KSA)	310	303	613	14	2
63	—	Muhammad Hanif Wijaya (INA)	299	314	613	13	9
64	40	Sajeev De Silva (SRI)	303	310	613	13	1
65	—	Erfan Arjangipour (IRI)	303	308	611	16	4
66	—	Itsarin Thai-uea (THA)	315	295	610	16	5
67	41	Nima Wangdi (BHU)	302	307	609	10	2
68	—	Ashim Sherchan (NEP)	292	316	608	15	5
69	—	Lam Dorji (BHU)	301	301	602	13	3
70	—	Chui Chun Man (HKG)	308	291	599	11	5
71	—	Min Prasad Gauchan (NEP)	308	289	597	10	2
72	—	Wan Tsz Kit (HKG)	300	295	595	12	5
73	42	Soulivong Onmanee (LAO)	302	290	592	6	0
74	43	Hamdan Al-Mansoori (UAE)	287	299	586	14	5
75	44	Ali Ahmed Salem (QAT)	279	300	579	10	2
76	—	Abdulaziz Al-Abadi (QAT)	296	280	576	11	2
77	45	Ahmed Al-Kaabi (UAE)	281	279	560	9	2
78	46	Idrees Majeed (PAK)	274	284	558	7	2
79	47	Umedzhon Khudoyarov (TJK)	220	220	440	1	0

=== Knockout round ===
==== Finals ====
Quarterfinals
1	Lee Woo-seok (KOR)	28	28	28	30	7
8	Wei Chun-heng (TPE)	25	26	28	29	1
12	Khairul Anuar Mohamad (MAS)	27	29	29	25	26	3
4	Ilfat Abdullin (KAZ)	29	29	28	28	30	7
19	Riau Ega Agata (INA)	27	27	28	28	29	7
11	Atanu Das (IND)	27	27	28	27	28	3
7	Takaharu Furukawa (JPN)	29	27	30	28	29	4
2	Kim Woo-jin (KOR)	28	28	29	29	30	6

Semifinals
1	Lee Woo-seok (KOR)	29	28	30	29	7
4	Ilfat Abdullin (KAZ)	27	28	27	26	1
19	Riau Ega Agata (INA)	27	27	30	28	2
2	Kim Woo-jin (KOR)	28	29	27	29	6

Gold medal match
1	Lee Woo-seok (KOR)	27	28	26	29	26	4
2	Kim Woo-jin (KOR)	27	26	27	29	27	6
Bronze medal match
4	Ilfat Abdullin (KAZ)	29	27	26	28	2
19	Riau Ega Agata (INA)	29	28	30	28	6

==== Section 1 ====
1/32 eliminations						1/16 eliminations								1/8 eliminations
						1	Lee Woo-seok (KOR)	27	28	29	28		6
33	Ma Hing Kin (HKG)	25	26	26	6	33	Ma Hing Kin (HKG)	28	24	26	25		2
32	Ibrahim Al-Mohanadi (QAT)	23	19	25	0									1	Lee Woo-seok (KOR)	28	30	29	26	7
														16	Chu Đức Anh (VIE)	28	24	27	25	1
						17	Hoàng Văn Lộc (VIE)	26	26	28	28	25	3
						16	Chu Đức Anh (VIE)	29	28	28	26	28	7

==== Section 2 ====
1/32 eliminations						1/16 eliminations								1/8 eliminations
						9	Xu Tianyu (CHN)	26	27	29	28	30	6
41	Nima Wangdi (BHU)	25	25	23	0	24	Tilak Pun Magar (NEP)	26	29	27	28	25	4
24	Tilak Pun Magar (NEP)	27	26	29	6									9	Xu Tianyu (CHN)	28	29	28	27	2
25	Roshan Nagarkoti (NEP)	24	24	25	0									8	Wei Chun-heng (TPE)	30	29	29	27	6
40	Sajeev De Silva (SRI)	27	28	27	6	40	Sajeev De Silva (SRI)	28	26	25	28		2
						8	Wei Chun-heng (TPE)	18	29	28	29		6

==== Section 3 ====
1/32 eliminations								1/16 eliminations							1/8 eliminations
								5	Tang Chih-chun (TPE)	28	27	28	26	1
37	Ulukbek Kursanaliev (KGZ)	26	26	25			0	28	Htike Lin Oo (MYA)	29	28	28	27	7
28	Htike Lin Oo (MYA)	27	28	28			6								28	Htike Lin Oo (MYA)	27	26	25	26	1
21	Sadegh Ashrafi (IRI)	27	23	26	28	26	4								12	Khairul Anuar Mohamad (MAS)	27	28	27	28	7
44	Ali Ahmed Salem (QAT)	28	25	25	22	27	6	44	Ali Ahmed Salem (QAT)	22	23	24		0
								12	Khairul Anuar Mohamad (MAS)	28	28	28		6

==== Section 4 ====
1/32 eliminations						1/16 eliminations							1/8 eliminations
						13	Vishwas (IND)	28	28	27	28	6
45	Ahmed Al-Kaabi (UAE)	23	21	24	0	20	Bataagiin Pürevsüren (MGL)	28	27	27	26	2
20	Bataagiin Pürevsüren (MGL)	25	28	28	6								13	Vishwas (IND)	26	28	28	26	1
29	Amin Pirali (IRI)	26	27	26	0								4	Ilfat Abdullin (KAZ)	28	29	28	28	7
36	Fares Al-Otaibi (KSA)	27	28	27	6	36	Fares Al-Otaibi (KSA)	26	24	24		0
						4	Ilfat Abdullin (KAZ)	30	30	29		6

==== Section 5 ====
1/32 eliminations									1/16 eliminations									1/8 eliminations
									3	Ruman Shana (BAN)	30	27	27	29			6
35	Mansour Alwi (KSA)	28	28	26	23	29	8	5	30	Witthaya Thamwong (THA)	26	27	27	28			2
30	Witthaya Thamwong (THA)	29	27	26	30	27	8^{*}	6										3	Ruman Shana (BAN)	26	28	28	29	28	4
19	Riau Ega Agata (INA)	28	28	29				6										19	Riau Ega Agata (INA)	27	29	27	28	29	6
46	Idrees Majeed (PAK)	22	21	19				0	19	Riau Ega Agata (INA)	27	29	27	28	24	10	6
									14	Akmal Nor Hasrin (MAS)	26	29	28	25	27	9	5

==== Section 6 ====
1/32 eliminations							1/16 eliminations								1/8 eliminations
							11	Atanu Das (IND)	28	28	25	28	29	7
43	Hamdan Al-Mansoori (UAE)	18	22	20		0	22	Pak Yong-won (PRK)	23	28	26	26	25	3
22	Pak Yong-won (PRK)	27	24	26		6									11	Atanu Das (IND)	27	30	29	28	27	7
27	Alek Edwar (INA)	29	26	25	29	6									6	Denis Gankin (KAZ)	28	27	29	27	26	3
38	Kinley Tshering (BHU)	28	25	28	24	2	27	Alek Edwar (INA)	25	27	26	25	28	3
							6	Denis Gankin (KAZ)	28	27	28	24	29	7

==== Section 7 ====
1/32 eliminations								1/16 eliminations							1/8 eliminations
								7	Takaharu Furukawa (JPN)	28	29	27	28	6
39	Lee Kar Wai (HKG)	27	27	27	26	19		26	Tanapat Pathairat (THA)	26	26	28	27	2
5	Tanapat Pathairat (THA)	24	27	27	27	27	6								7	Takaharu Furukawa (JPN)	26	26	29	28	29	6
23	Ibrahim Sheik Rezowan (BAN)	26	27	27			6								10	Li Jialun (CHN)	26	27	29	23	27	4
42	Soulivong Onmanee (LAO)	25	26	26			0	23	Ibrahim Sheik Rezowan (BAN)	27	29	25	23	2
								10	Li Jialun (CHN)	29	26	28	28	6

==== Section 8 ====
1/32 eliminations								1/16 eliminations								1/8 eliminations
								15	Baatarkhuyagiin Otgonbold (MGL)	28	25	30	28	23	4
47	Umedzhon Khudoyarov (TJK)	19	26	16			0	18	Hiroki Muto (JPN)	29	29	29	25	29	6
18	Hiroki Muto (JPN)	26	27	28			6									18	Hiroki Muto (JPN)	27	28	30	26	1
31	Tan Si Lie (SGP)	28	27	25	25	29	7									2	Kim Woo-jin (KOR)	29	30	30	30	7
34	Ri Tae-bom (PRK)	27	25	27	25	28	3	31	Tan Si Lie (SGP)	29	27	24	27		1
								2	Kim Woo-jin (KOR)	29	29	29	28		7
