= Archery at the 2020 Summer Olympics – Mixed team =

Mixed team at the Games of the XXXII Olympiad
- Archery pictogram
- Venue: Yumenoshima Park
- Date: 23 July (ranking rounds); 24 July (match play)
- Competitors: 58 from 29 nations

Medalists
1st place, gold medalist(s)		Kim Je-deok; An San	South Korea
2nd place, silver medalist(s)		Steve Wijler; Gabriela Schloesser	Netherlands
3rd place, bronze medalist(s)		Luis Álvarez; Alejandra Valencia	Mexico

The mixed team archery event was one of five archery events to take place at the 2020 Summer Olympics. It was held at Yumenoshima Park, with the ranking rounds taking place on 23 July and match play on 24 July. 16 teams competed in the knockout rounds, with the qualifying teams determined by the ranking rounds in which 29 different nations had at least one archer in each of the men's and women's divisions.

== Background ==
This was a new event at the 2020 Games, in the first change to the archery programme since men's and women's team events were added in 1988.

The mixed team event was first contested at a World Cup event in 2007. It was added as a demonstration event to the 2009 World Archery Championships, then as a full event to the 2011 World Archery Championships. It has been on the Youth Olympics programme since the 2010 Summer Youth Olympics and on the Paralympic program since the 2016 Summer Paralympics.

== Qualification ==
No quota spots are allocated directly to the mixed team event. Instead, qualifying for the mixed team competition is done at the Games themselves, during the men's and women's ranking rounds. Each National Olympic Committee (NOC) with at least one archer in both the men's individual and women's individual events has an opportunity to qualify. The score of the top man and top woman in the ranking round for each such NOC are summed to give a mixed team ranking round score; the top 16 NOCs qualify for the mixed team event's match play rounds.

== Competition format ==
As with the other archery events, the mixed team was a recurve archery event, held under the World Archery-approved 70-meter distance and rules. 16 teams of 2 archers (one man, one woman) each participate in the match play rounds. Competition begins with the ranking round, in which each archer shoots 72 arrows (these are the same ranking rounds used for the men's individual event and women's individual event). The combined scores from the ranking round are used to seed the teams into a single-elimination bracket (with only the top 16 teams advancing). Each match consists of four sets of 4 arrows, two per archer. The team with the highest score in the set – the total of the four arrows – receives two set points; if the teams are tied, each receives one set point. The first team to five set points wins the match. If the match is tied at 4–4 after 4 sets, a tie-breaker set is used with each archer on the team shooting one arrow; if the score of the tie-breaker set remains tied, the closest arrow to the center wins.

== Records ==
This was a new event at the 2020 Games and therefore did not have an Olympic record. Prior to this competition, the existing world record was as follows.

- 144 arrow ranking round

World record	South Korea; Kang Chae-young, Lee Woo-seok	1388	's-Hertogenbosch, Netherlands	10 June 2019
Olympic record	New event	New event	New event	New event

== Schedule ==
All times are Japan Standard Time (UTC+9)

The schedule for the mixed team event covered two separate days of competition.

Date	Time	Round
Friday, 23 July 2021	9:00; 13:00	Women's ranking round Men's ranking round
Saturday, 24 July 2021	9:30; 14:15; 15:31; 16:25; 16:45	1/8 finals Quarter-finals; Semi-finals; Bronze medal match Gold medal match

== Results ==
=== Ranking round ===
Rank	Nation	Archers	Score	10s	Xs
1	South Korea	Kim Je-deok; An San	1368 (OR) Q	79	31
2	United States	Brady Ellison; Mackenzie Brown	1350 Q	69	24
3	Japan	Hiroki Muto; Azusa Yamauchi	1343 Q	67	19
4	Mexico	Luis Álvarez; Alejandra Valencia	1336 Q	60	23
5	China	Wei Shaoxuan; Yang Xiaolei	1328 Q	57	11
6	Netherlands	Steve Wijler; Gabriela Schloesser	1327 Q	60	15
7	Turkey	Mete Gazoz; Yasemin Anagöz	1321 Q	57	18
8	Chinese Taipei	Tang Chih-chun; Lin Chia-en	1319 Q	59	13
9	India	Pravin Jadhav; Deepika Kumari	1319 Q	52	18
10	ROC	Galsan Bazarzhapov; Ksenia Perova	1317 Q	53	16
11	Italy	Mauro Nespoli; Chiara Rebagliati	1316 Q	52	15
12	Great Britain	Patrick Huston; Sarah Bettles	1311 Q	55	20
13	Germany	Florian Unruh; Michelle Kroppen	1309 Q	49	12
14	France	Pierre Plihon; Lisa Barbelin	1307 Q	55	16
15	Indonesia	Riau Ega Agatha; Diananda Choirunisa	1297 Q	52	15
16	Bangladesh	Ruman Shana; Diya Siddique	1297 Q	47	16
17	Canada	Crispin Duenas; Stephanie Barrett	1295	38	10
18	Ukraine	Oleksii Hunbin; Veronika Marchenko	1291	57	18
19	Malaysia	Khairul Anuar Mohamad; Syaqiera Mashayikh	1291	46	15
20	Brazil	Marcus Vinicius D'Almeida; Ane Marcelle dos Santos	1287	39	14
21	Spain	Daniel Castro; Inés de Velasco	1278	39	11
22	Moldova	Dan Olaru; Alexandra Mîrca	1275	40	11
23	Vietnam	Nguyễn Hoàng Phi Vũ; Đỗ Thị Ánh Nguyệt	1275	38	8
24	Poland	Sławomir Napłoszek; Sylwia Zyzańska	1267	43	16
25	Australia	Taylor Worth; Alice Ingley	1267	36	11
26	Colombia	Daniel Pineda; Valentina Acosta	1266	38	11
27	Mongolia	Otgonbold Baatarkhuyag; Bishindeegiin Urantungalag	1260	36	8
28	Tunisia	Mohamed Hammed; Rihab Elwalid	1240	28	8
29	Egypt	Youssof Tolba; Amal Adam	1215	35	13

Note: China swapped out its highest scoring archers from the ranking round. Wang Dapeng and Wu Jiaxin will compete in the final rounds.
France swapped out its highest scoring men's archer from the ranking round. Jean-Charles Valladont will compete in the final rounds.

=== Competition bracket ===
1/8 eliminations
1	South Korea	6	38	35	39
16	Bangladesh	0	30	33	38
9	India	5	35	38	40	37
8	Chinese Taipei	3	36	38	35	36
5	China	3	35	34	38	37
12	Great Britain	5	36	36	36	37
13	Germany	2	35	39	35	34
4	Mexico	6	37	37	36	37
3	Japan	3	37	35	33	33
14	France	5	36	39	33	37
11	Italy	0	36	34	33
6	Netherlands	6	37	39	35
7	Turkey	6	37	38	34	35
10	ROC	2	37	37	34	33
15	Indonesia	5	37	36	33	36	20
2	United States	4	34	33	34	37	18

Quarter-finals
1	South Korea	6	35	38	35	36
9	India	2	32	37	38	33
12	Great Britain	0	36	37	34
4	Mexico	6	38	39	36
14	France	4	37	35	34	37	17
6	Netherlands	5	34	37	37	35	19
7	Turkey	6	34	38	36	35
15	Indonesia	2	35	35	35	33

Semi-finals
1	South Korea	5	37	39	38
4	Mexico	1	37	37	36
6	Netherlands	5	36	36	36	37
7	Turkey	3	35	35	37	37

Gold medal match
1	South Korea	5	35	37	36	39
6	Netherlands	3	38	36	33	39
Bronze medal match
4	Mexico	6	36	27	39	34
7	Turkey	2	34	36	36	33

- The figure in italics signifies the set scores.
