= Archery at the 2024 Summer Olympics – Men's individual =

Men's individual at the Games of the XXXIII Olympiad
- Venue: Les Invalides
- Date: 25 July 2024 (ranking round); 30 July – 4 August 2024 (match play); 4 August 2024 (finals)
- Competitors: 64 from 40 nations

Medalists
1st place, gold medalist(s)		Kim Woo-jin	South Korea
2nd place, silver medalist(s)		Brady Ellison	United States
3rd place, bronze medalist(s)		Lee Woo-seok	South Korea

The men's individual archery event was one of five archery events at the 2024 Summer Olympics. It was held at Les Invalides. There were 64 competitors from 40 nations, with nations having either 1 or 3 archers.

== Qualification ==
64 archers qualify for the men's archery events. The 12 National Olympic Committees (NOCs) that qualify for the men's team event (including the host, France) enter the 3 team members in the individual event as well. Otherwise, NOCs may qualify a maximum of 1 archer in men's individual. There are quota spots available at various tournaments, including the World Championships, multiple continental events, and a final qualification tournament. There are also two Tripartite Commission invitational spots.

== Competition format ==
As with the other archery events, the men's individual is a recurve archery event, held under the World Archery-approved 70-meter distance and rules. Competition begins with a ranking round, in which each archer shoots 72 arrows. The scores from the ranking round are used to seed the archers into a single-elimination bracket. The knockout matches used the set system introduced in 2012. Each match consists of up to 5 sets of 3 arrows per archer. The archer with the best score in each set wins the set, earning 2 points. If the score is tied, each archer receives 1 point. The first archer to 6 points wins the match. If the match is tied 5–5 after 5 sets, a single tie-breaker arrow is to be used with the closest to center winning.

== Records ==
Prior to the competition, the world and Olympic records were as follows.

- 72 arrow ranking round

World record	Brady Ellison (USA)	702	Lima, Peru	7 August 2019
Olympic record	Kim Woo-jin (KOR)	700	Rio de Janeiro, Brazil	5 August 2016

== Schedule ==
All times are Central European Time (UTC+1)

The schedule for the men's individual event covers five separate days of competition.

Date	Time	Round
Thursday, 25 July 2024	14:15	Ranking round
Tuesday, 30 July 2024; Wednesday, 31 July 2024; Thursday, 1 August 2024	12:00; 17:45	1/32 finals 1/16 finals
Sunday, 4 August 2024	9:30; 13:00; 13:52; 14:33; 14:46	1/8 finals Quarter-finals; Semi-finals; Bronze medal match Gold medal match

== Results ==
=== Ranking round ===
The ranking round was held on 25 July 2024. All 64 entrants took part, and were seeded in places 1 to 64 depending on their ranking. The scores will also be used to rank the men's team and mixed team events.

Rank	Archer	Nation	10s	Xs	Score
1	Kim Woo-jin	South Korea	43	17	686
2	Kim Je-deok	South Korea	42	13	682
3	Florian Unruh	Germany	39	15	681
4	Dhiraj Bommadevara	India	39	14	681
5	Lee Woo-seok	South Korea	35	19	681
6	Baptiste Addis	France	36	11	678
7	Brady Ellison	United States	34	15	677
8	Mete Gazoz	Turkey	37	18	676
9	Thomas Chirault	France	34	14	676
10	Berkim Tümer	Turkey	34	7	676
11	Matías Grande	Mexico	33	8	676
12	Wang Yan	China	34	12	675
13	Amirkhon Sadikov	Uzbekistan	32	8	674
14	Tarundeep Rai	India	31	9	674
15	Santiago Arcila	Colombia	39	8	673
16	Nicholas D'Amour	Virgin Islands	36	12	673
17	Marcus D'Almeida	Brazil	28	7	673
18	Dan Olaru	Moldova	36	10	671
19	Jean-Charles Valladont	France	32	10	671
20	Mauro Nespoli	Italy	33	11	670
21	Hugo Franco	Cuba	35	14	669
22	Dauletkeldi Zhangbyrbay	Kazakhstan	34	13	668
23	Steve Wijler	Netherlands	32	10	668
24	Tai Yu-hsuan	Chinese Taipei	33	11	665
25	Tang Chih-chun	Chinese Taipei	29	10	665
26	Kao Wenchao	China	28	7	665
27	Alex Wise	Great Britain	29	7	664
28	Lam Dorji	Bhutan	33	9	663
29	Ilfat Abdullin	Kazakhstan	31	11	663
30	Junya Nakanishi	Japan	28	10	663
31	Žiga Ravnikar	Slovenia	28	9	663
32	Li Zih-siang	Chinese Taipei	33	13	662
33	Pablo Acha	Spain	29	17	662
34	Federico Musolesi	Italy	29	6	662
35	Takaharu Furukawa	Japan	27	7	659
36	Eric Peters	Canada	20	7	659
37	Alessandro Paoli	Italy	31	10	658
38	Li Zhongyuan	China	30	13	658
39	Pravin Jadhav	India	25	8	658
40	Arif Dwi Pangestu	Indonesia	30	7	656
41	Antti Tekoniemi	Finland	26	10	656
42	Roy Dror	Israel	29	12	655
43	Jorge Enríquez	Colombia	26	13	655
44	Bruno Martínez	Mexico	21	5	653
45	Sagor Islam	Bangladesh	28	10	652
46	Conor Hall	Great Britain	24	6	652
47	Lê Quốc Phong	Vietnam	23	9	652
48	Mykhailo Usach	Ukraine	22	4	651
49	Fumiya Saito	Japan	28	11	650
50	Pit Klein	Luxembourg	22	5	650
51	Tom Hall	Great Britain	19	7	645
52	Damián Jajarabilla	Argentina	22	12	643
53	Óscar Ticas	El Salvador	21	10	643
54	Baatarkhuyagiin Otgonbold	Mongolia	21	4	643
55	Carlos Rojas	Mexico	20	6	643
56	Andrés Hernández	Colombia	16	1	642
57	Andrés Gallardo	Chile	20	5	641
58	Abdullah Yıldırmış	Turkey	23	9	640
59	Alexandr Yeremenko	Kazakhstan	20	2	640
60	Peter Boukouvalas	Australia	18	8	638
61	Adam Li	Czech Republic	18	6	627
62	Youssof Tolba	Egypt	15	5	624
63	Wian Roux	South Africa	14	5	601
64	Israel Madaye	Chad	15	3	600

=== Competition bracket ===
==== Section 1 ====
Round of 64
1	Kim W-j (KOR)	6	29	29	30
64	I Madaye (CHA)	0	26	15	25
33	P Acha (ESP)	2	27	27	29	26
32	Lin Z-s (TPE)	6	28	28	29	26
17	M D'Almeida (BRA)	6	29	28	29	30
48	M Usach (UKR)	2	30	26	28	27
49	F Saito (JPN)	6	29	24	27	27	28
16	N D'Amour (ISV)	4	29	27	26	27	27
9	T Chirault (FRA)	7	27	27	29	30
56	A Hernández (COL)	1	25	27	27	26
41	A Tekoniemi (FIN)	0	25	26	26
24	Tai Y-h (TPE)	6	27	28	27
25	Tang C-c (TPE)	7	29	30	29	29
40	A Dwi Pangestu (INA)	1	29	29	28	28
57	A Gallardo (CHI)	0	26	25	26
8	M Gazoz (TUR)	6	30	26	29

Round of 32
1	Kim W-j (KOR)	6	30	29	30
32	Li Z-s (TPE)	0	27	28	26
17	M D'Almeida (BRA)	7	29	29	30	28
49	F Saito (JPN)	1	25	28	30	26
9	T Chirault (FRA)	6^{10}	29	28	28	30	27
24	Tai Y-h (TPE)	5^{8}	26	29	28	26	29
25	Tang C-c (TPE)	2	29	27	28	29
8	M Gazoz (TUR)	6	30	28	27	30

Round of 16
1	Kim W-j (KOR)	7	29	30	30	30
17	M D'Almeida (BRA)	1	29	27	29	28
9	T Chirault (FRA)	5^{9}	29	28	27	28	28
8	M Gazoz (TUR)	6^{10}	25	28	26	29	29

Quarter-finals
1	Kim W-j (KOR)	6	25	29	29	26	28
8	M Gazoz (TUR)	4	28	28	26	27	26

==== Section 2 ====
Round of 64
5	Lee W-s (KOR)	6	29	28	29
60	P Boukouvalas (AUS)	0	26	26	28
37	A Paoli (ITA)	7	26	25	30	29	28
28	L Dorji (BHU)	3	26	27	26	26	27
21	H Franco (CUB)	7	26	27	28	29	27
44	B Martínez (MEX)	3	26	28	27	27	26
53	Ó Ticas (ESA)	0	23	28	27
12	Wang Y (CHN)	6	27	29	28
13	A Sadikov (UZB)	6	27	29	28	28
52	D Jajarabilla (ARG)	2	28	27	26	27
45	S Islam (BAN)	0	27	26	25
20	M Nespoli (ITA)	6	30	27	28
29	I Abdullin (KAZ)	4	27	28	29	29	26
36	E Peters (CAN)	6	29	28	29	28	28
61	A Li (CZE)	1	29	26	28	26
4	D Bommadevara (IND)	7	29	29	29	28

Round of 32
5	Lee W-s (KOR)	6	30	28	30
37	A Paoli (ITA)	0	28	26	28
21	H Franco (CUB)	2	28	25	26	27
12	Wang Y (CHN)	6	27	29	28	28
13	A Sadikov (UZB)	4	30	30	25	28	27
20	M Nespoli (ITA)	6	28	29	27	29	28
36	E Peters (CAN)	6^{10+}	27	29	27	30	30
4	D Bommadevara (IND)	5^{10}	28	28	29	30	29

Round of 16
5	Lee W-s (KOR)	6	30	29	30	30
12	Wang Y (CHN)	2	29	29	28	30
20	M Nespoli (ITA)	6	28	30	28	29
36	E Peters (CAN)	2	23	30	28	26

Quarter-finals
5	Lee W-s (KOR)	6	27	29	29	30	28
20	M Nespoli (ITA)	4	28	29	29	29	27

==== Section 3 ====
Round of 64
3	F Unruh (GER)	6	27	30	30
62	Y Tolba (EGY)	0	26	28	26
35	T Furukawa (JPN)	4	29	29	24	25	26
30	J Nakanishi (JPN)	6	26	27	29	27	27
19	J-c Valladont (FRA)	4	27	28	28	29	27
46	C Hall (GBR)	6	29	28	28	27	30
51	T Hall (GBR)	6	27	28	25	29	29
14	T Rai (IND)	4	27	27	28	28	29
11	M Grande (MEX)	7	28	28	28	29
54	O Baatarkhuyag (MGL)	1	28	27	27	25
43	J Enríquez (COL)	7	29	26	28	26	29
22	D Zhangbyrbay (KAZ)	3	28	26	27	28	27
27	A Wise (GBR)	6	28	27	28	28	27
38	Li ZY (CHN)	4	27	29	27	28	27
59	A Yeremenko (KAZ)	2	30	21	24	26
6	B Addis (FRA)	6	27	27	29	28

Round of 32
3	F Unruh (GER)	6	30	28	28	29	28
30	J Nakanishi (JPN)	4	29	27	29	29	28
46	C Hall (GBR)	5^{8}	29	29	26	29	28
51	T Hall (GBR)	6^{10}	29	29	30	27	28
11	M Grande (MEX)	6	29	28	27	30
43	J Enríquez (COL)	2	28	28	27	28
27	A Wise (GBR)	3	27	29	28	26	26
6	B Addis (FRA)	7	27	28	29	27	27

Round of 16
3	F Unruh (GER)	7	27	28	28	26	28
51	T Hall (GBR)	3	25	28	25	27	27
11	M Grande (MEX)	4	28	29	29	29	26
6	B Addis (FRA)	6	29	28	30	28	29

Quarter-finals
3	F Unruh (GER)	6^{X}	25	29	26	29	29
6	B Addis (FRA)	5^{10}	25	29	27	29	28

==== Section 4 ====
Round of 64
7	B Ellison (USA)	6	29	28	30	28
58	A Yıldırmış (TUR)	2	27	28	28	28
39	P Jadhav (IND)	0	28	29	27
26	Kao WC (CHN)	6	29	30	28
23	S Wijler (NED)	6	27	29	27	29
42	R Dror (ISR)	2	26	25	28	27
55	C Rojas (MEX)	4	26	26	26	27	27
10	B Tümer (TUR)	6	28	24	25	29	28
15	S Arcila (COL)	6	26	27	26	29	28
50	P Klein (LUX)	4	30	27	23	27	28
47	Lê Q P (VIE)	0	24	28	26
18	D Olaru (MDA)	6	28	30	27
31	Ž Ravnikar (SLO)	4	24	26	26	27	27
34	F Musolesi (ITA)	6	26	27	26	26	27
63	W Roux (RSA)	0	25	25	29
2	Kim J-d (KOR)	6	29	29	30

Round of 32
7	B Ellison (USA)	6	28	28	27	29
26	Kao WC (CHN)	2	27	27	29	27
23	S Wijler (NED)	2	28	27	24	26
10	B Tümer (TUR)	6	28	27	28	28
15	S Arcila (COL)	6	26	27	28	28
18	D Olaru (MDA)	2	29	24	26	25
34	F Musolesi (ITA)	4	27	29	28	27	28
2	Kim J-d (KOR)	6	26	29	29	29	28

Round of 16
7	B Ellison (USA)	6	28	29	29	30
10	B Tümer (TUR)	2	26	28	29	30
15	S Arcila (COL)	4	27	25	28	28	27
2	Kim J-d (KOR)	6	30	27	27	27	28

Quarter-finals
7	B Ellison (USA)	6	28	29	30
2	Kim J-d (KOR)	0	27	28	27

== Finals ==
Semi-finals
1	Kim Woo-jin (KOR)	6^{10}	28	30	29	29	29
5	Lee Woo-seok (KOR)	5^{9}	29	28	30	29	27
3	Florian Unruh (GER)	3	27	28	29	29	27
7	Brady Ellison (USA)	7	29	28	30	28	29

Gold medal match
1	Kim Woo-jin (KOR)	6^{10+}	27	28	27	29	30
7	Brady Ellison (USA)	5^{10}	29	24	29	27	30
Bronze medal match
5	Lee Woo-seok (KOR)	6	29	29	29
3	Florian Unruh (GER)	0	27	28	28

- (+) Won the shoot-off by the arrow closer to the center of the target.
