= Archery at the 2025 Summer World University Games – Men's individual recurve =

Men's individual recurve at the 2025 Summer World University Games
- Venue: Sportpark am Hallo (qualification); Zollverein Coal Mine Industrial Complex (finals)
- Location: Essen, Germany
- Dates: 22 – 26 July 2025
- Competitors: 86

The men's individual recurve archery competition at the 2025 Summer World University Games was held at the Sportpark am Hallo and the Zollverein Coal Mine Industrial Complex in Essen, Germany from 22 to 26 July 2025.

== Records ==
Prior to the competition, the world and Universiade records were as follows.

- 72 arrows ranking round

Category	Athlete	Record	Date	Place	Event
World record	(United States) Brady Ellison	702	7 August 2019	Lima, Peru	2019 Pan American Games
Universiade record	(South Korea) Lee Seung-yun	693	4 July 2015	Gwangju, South Korea	2015 Summer Universiade

== Ranking round ==
The ranking round was held on 22 May 2025 to determine the seeding for the elimination rounds. It consisted of two rounds of 36 arrows, with a maximum score of 720. Defending Universiade champion Seo Min-gi of Korea topped the seedings, repeating his strong showing from Chengdu two years ago.

Qualified for 1/16 Round
Qualified for 1/24 Round
Qualified for 1/48 Round

Rank	Archer	1st Half	2nd Half	10s	Xs	Score	Notes
1	Seo Min-gi (KOR)	345	338	39	23	683	Q
2	Kim Seonwoo (KOR)	336	333	34	7	669	Q
3	Feng Hao (CHN)	338	337	34	13	675	
4	Kwok Yin Chai (HKG)	338	337	31	12	675	
5	Yashdeep Bhoge (IND)	335	339	35	10	674	
6	Thomas Chirault (FRA)	330	339	27	11	669	
7	Kao Wenchao (CHN)	332	336	29	14	668	
8	Tetsuya Aoshima (JPN)	333	334	32	9	667	
9	Matteo Bilisari (ITA)	330	337	27	14	667	
10	Nozomi Fujii (JPN)	335	331	34	11	666	
11	Matteo Borsani (ITA)	333	329	36	5	662	
12	Samet Ak (TUR)	333	327	28	12	660	
13	Dan Olaru (MDA)	327	331	23	10	658	
14	Sachin Gupta (IND)	336	321	27	11	657	
15	Kuo Yu-cheng (TPE)	329	327	30	11	656	
16	Francesco Gregori (ITA)	322	334	29	4	656	
17	Chang Yi-chung (TPE)	322	334	25	8	656	
18	Reza Shabani (IRI)	322	334	22	3	656	
19	Akhit Samudrala (IND)	326	328	26	9	654	
20	Tsenguun Tsogtbayar (MGL)	327	325	26	9	652	
21	Maksymilian Osuch (POL)	327	324	21	8	651	
22	Clément Jacquey (FRA)	320	330	20	5	650	
23	Choi Doo-hee (KOR)	326	323	26	7	649	
24	Shi Zhenqi (CHN)	326	323	20	8	649	
25	Mansur Alimbayev (KAZ)	324	324	20	7	648	
26	Yang Zong-han (TPE)	324	323	19	4	647	
27	Yuki Kawata (JPN)	317	329	23	10	646	
28	Iban Bariteaud (FRA)	321	325	22	6	646	
29	Alexandr Yeremenko (KAZ)	321	321	19	7	642	
30	Efe Gürkan Maraş (TUR)	320	320	19	6	640	
31	Sergej Podkrajšek (SLO)	321	316	22	9	637	
32	Mohd Rizuwan (MAS)	323	313	16	5	636	
33	Mohamad Firdaus Mohd Rusmadi (MAS)	313	320	19	6	633	
34	Jonathan Vetter (GER)	305	324	21	8	629	
35	Piotr Starzycki (POL)	317	312	18	5	629	
36	Arkadiusz Smoliński (POL)	323	305	16	5	628	
37	Yip Tin Long (HKG)	318	310	16	3	628	
38	Ivan Bercha (KAZ)	314	311	19	7	625	
39	Félix Möckli (SUI)	305	319	17	8	624	
40	Stefan Kostyk (UKR)	317	306	21	7	623	
41	Enkhbayar Munkh-Erdene (MGL)	305	314	12	1	619	
42	Leung Cheuk Yin (HKG)	308	309	14	6	617	
43	Lukas Kurz (AUT)	310	302	14	5	612	
44	Ondrej Franců (SVK)	310	302	13	4	612	
45	Wian Roux (RSA)	298	313	19	3	611	
46	Markus Kuhrau (AUS)	300	309	15	7	609	
47	Christopher Austin (USA)	303	304	14	4	607	
48	Muhammad Farhan Rhyme (MAS)	298	303	15	5	601	
49	Hames Gaze (AUS)	297	304	13	3	601	
50	Valentin Choffat (SUI)	303	297	11	7	600	
51	Khatanzorig Namsrai (MGL)	286	307	9	4	593	
52	Verne Vuorinen (FIN)	302	290	12	2	592	
53	Jason Hurnall (AUS)	286	305	11	3	591	
54	Ahmad Huseynov (AZE)	269	316	15	1	585	
55	Maroš Machán (SVK)	279	302	14	3	581	
56	Andrej Majerik (SVK)	281	300	10	2	581	
57	Helbert Climaco (PHI)	284	265	11	3	549	

== Elimination stage ==
The results are as below.

=== Section 1 ===
1/48 elimination round
33	T Carbonetti (BEL)	25	26	26	29	6
80	M Sadoveanu (MDA)	22	18	27	19	2
81	B-A Altanpurev (MGL)	28	27	23	19	26	4
32	M Špinar (CZE)	26	25	27	29	28	6
65	G Kononovs (LAT)	24	23	23	0
48	K Kupczak (POL)	29	26	28	6
49	M F Mohd Rusmadi (MAS)	24	26	25	6
64	M Mihevc (SLO)	21	24	24	0

1/24 elimination round
33	T Carbonetti (BEL)	28	28	27	26	26	7
32	M Špinar (CZE)	25	27	29	26	25	3
17	A Gilliam (USA)	28	28	27	6
48	K Kupczak (POL)	27	26	25	0
49	M F Mohd Rusmadi (MAS)	24	29	28	26	24	3
16	J De Smedt (BEL)	30	28	28	29	28	7

Round of 32
1	Seo M-g (KOR)	26	30	29	29	6
33	T Carbonetti (BEL)	27	25	25	28	2
17	A Gilliam (USA)	26	27	26	0
16	J De Smedt (BEL)	27	30	29	6

Round of 16
1	Seo M-g (KOR)	28	27	29	27	30	7
16	J De Smedt (BEL)	28	26	27	28	28	3

=== Section 2 ===
1/48 elimination round
57	A Mangerini (ITA)	24	24	27	26	26	3
56	MHB Khalil (MAS)	23	26	27	28	27	7
41	F Márquez (MEX)	25	27	29	0
72	A Batrachenko (UKR)	28	28	30	6
73	E Olsson (SWE)	25	28	23	27	22	6
40	P Luettmerding (GER)	24	27	29	29	16	4

1/24 elimination round
9	Feng H (CHN)	27	29	28	29	6
56	MHB Khalil (MAS)	28	25	26	26	2
24	K Shirai (JPN)	28	28	24	6
72	A Batrachenko (UKR)	27	27	23	0
25	M Osuch (POL)	29	28	27	6
73	E Olsson (SWE)	27	21	25	0

Round of 32
9	Feng H (CHN)	26	30	30	28	6
24	K Shirai (JPN)	27	26	28	27	2
25	M Osuch (POL)	28	29	27	29	27-T.8	5
8	Wang Y (CHN)	28	28	29	27	30-T.9	6

Round of 16
9	Feng H (CHN)	29	28	30	6
8	Wang Y (CHN)	28	27	27	0

=== Section 3 ===
1/48 elimination round
37	V Kunnavakkam (USA)	27	28	26	6
76	A Samec (SLO)	23	25	25	0
85	WJ Ng (SGP)	25	23	20	0
28	Kuo Y-c (TPE)	26	27	28	6
69	W Roux (RSA)	25	26	25	23	1
44	C Piggott (GBR)	26	28	25	27	7
53	V Chen (CAN)	23	24	28	24	2
60	B McLean (NZL)	26	30	27	29	6

1/24 elimination round
37	V Kunnavakkam (USA)	27	28	25	25	1
28	Kuo Y-c (TPE)	30	28	27	29	7
21	I Bercha (KAZ)	25	27	29	28	26-T.9	5
44	C Piggott (GBR)	28	27	25	27	28-T.10	6
60	B McLean (NZL)	22	29	27	27	24	4
12	M Wieser (GER)	28	28	27	27	27	6

Round of 32
5	R Dror (ISR)	26	29	27	27	2
28	Kuo Y-c (TPE)	28	27	29	28	6
44	C Piggott (GBR)	28	28	27	26	2
12	M Wieser (GER)	27	29	28	27	6

Round of 16
28	Kuo Y-c (TPE)	25	26	26	0
12	M Wieser (GER)	28	27	28	6

=== Section 4 ===
1/48 elimination round
61	Yip TL (HKG)	24	24	24	0
52	N Condurache (ROU)	28	26	25	6
45	F Möckli (SUI)	23	27	27	26	27-T.9	5
68	A Collas (BEL)	26	26	26	26	26-T.9+	6
29	A Rana (IND)	27	26	27	26	27	6
84	A Vlase (ROU)	29	27	19	20	18	4
77	B Ilyin (UKR)	27	24	24	26	1
36	M Aliyev (AZE)	27	25	28	28	7

1/24 elimination round
13	Qin WY (CHN)	26	28	25	6
52	N Condurache (ROU)	25	19	23	0
68	A Collas (BEL)	25	29	27	26	24	4
20	B Akkoyun (TUR)	24	29	27	26	28	6
29	A Rana (IND)	28	27	23	30	27	6
36	M Aliyev (AZE)	29	25	26	28	26	4

Round of 32
13	Qin WY (CHN)	28	28	27	29	6
20	B Akkoyun (TUR)	27	27	28	26	2
29	A Rana (IND)	28	28	26	27	2
4	Y Funahashi (JPN)	29	25	27	28	6

Round of 16
13	Qin WY (CHN)	29	28	25	29	6
4	Y Funahashi (JPN)	26	27	28	28	2

=== Section 5 ===
1/48 elimination round
35	F Gregori (ITA)	28	28	26	28	7
78	N Petäjä (FIN)	25	28	24	26	1
83	E Savciuc (MDA)	25	23	23	0
30	C Isles (AUS)	26	26	27	6
67	L Tura (SMR)	24	24	26	25	1
46	E Roziner (ISR)	24	27	27	27	7
51	A Renaud (SUI)	24	26	28	18	24	6
62	A Belici (MDA)	27	20	23	26	23	4

1/24 elimination round
35	F Gregori (ITA)	25	28	25	28	25	3
30	C Isles (AUS)	27	25	27	28	26	7
19	N Bernardi (FRA)	27	27	26	27	26	4
46	E Roziner (ISR)	28	28	25	20	29	6
51	A Renaud (SUI)	28	28	27	26	2
14	Su Y-y (TPE)	30	26	28	29	6

Round of 32
3	Tang C-c (TPE)	27	28	30	6
30	C Isles (AUS)	23	25	27	0
46	E Roziner (ISR)	25	24	27	0
14	Su Y-y (TPE)	28	27	28	6

Round of 16
3	Tang C-c (TPE)	28	29	26	29	6
14	Su Y-y (TPE)	27	28	29	26	2

=== Section 6 ===
1/48 elimination round
59	R Viale (FRA)	28	28	28	26	7
54	T Tsogtbayar (MGL)	28	25	27	24	1
43	J Bąk (POL)	27	27	26	6
70	B Lee (CAN)	23	26	24	0
27	K Chabin (SUI)	28	28	29	6
86	F Carreira (POR)	16	22	22	0
75	L Jacobsson (SWE)	24	26	26	28	21	3
38	MAB Ezaidin (MAS)	25	28	24	28	26	7

1/24 elimination round
11	J Pedoux (FRA)	28	27	26	27	6
59	R Viale (FRA)	23	28	25	26	2
43	J Bąk (POL)	26	28	27	27	23	3
22	J Vetter (GER)	27	26	27	28	28	7
27	K Chabin (SUI)	27	27	27	29	6
38	MAB Ezaidin (MAS)	26	27	26	29	2

Round of 32
11	J Pedoux (FRA)	25	26	25	0
22	J Vetter (GER)	26	27	27	6
27	K Chabin (SUI)	28	27	27	25	2
6	T Cowles (USA)	29	28	24	26	6

Round of 16
22	J Vetter (GER)	27	28	27	28	30	7
6	T Cowles (USA)	28	25	27	27	27	3

=== Section 7 ===
1/48 elimination round
39	L Sulik (CRO)	27	26	27	6
74	Liew ZY (SGP)	25	24	24	0
71	C Young (RSA)	26	26	22	21	1
42	V Choudhary (IND)	27	26	26	23	7
55	Chu PH (HKG)	25	26	28	26	2
58	D Medveczky (SVK)	27	26	29	26	6

1/24 elimination round
39	L Sulik (CRO)	28	26	28	29	26	4
26	C Christensen (DEN)	25	29	29	27	30	6
23	A Yıldırmış (TUR)	29	28	27	28	6
42	V Choudhary (IND)	28	25	27	28	2
58	D Medveczky (SVK)	28	25	27	28	1
10	M Borsani (ITA)	29	29	27	30	7

Round of 32
7	T Aoshima (JPN)	28	28	28	28	27	7
26	C Christensen (DEN)	24	28	28	28	25	3
23	A Yıldırmış (TUR)	26	29	27	26	1
10	M Borsani (ITA)	28	29	29	28	7

Round of 16
7	T Aoshima (JPN)	27	30	27	28	2
10	M Borsani (ITA)	29	30	28	28	6

=== Section 8 ===
1/48 elimination round
63	U Hoshimov (UZB)	23	26	27	24	23	4
50	L Kurz (AUT)	26	21	27	27	25	6
47	M Chauhan (IND)	27	28	28	27	7
66	I Allen (GUA)	25	24	28	26	1
31	N Frenkel (ISR)	28	28	25	26	29	7
82	R Lõpp (EST)	23	25	26	26	27	3
79	S Ribeiro (POR)	25	26	22	22	1
34	E Munkh-Erdene (MGL)	26	26	27	27	7

1/24 elimination round
15	Kim Y-c (KOR)	28	27	25	28	27	7
50	L Kurz (AUT)	26	27	26	26	3
47	M Chauhan (IND)	28	29	26	27	28	4
18	B Tümer (TUR)	26	28	29	28	29	6
31	N Frenkel (ISR)	28	27	25	6
34	E Munkh-Erdene (MGL)	27	25	23	0

Round of 32
15	Kim Y-c (KOR)	24	29	26	26	1
18	B Tümer (TUR)	28	29	30	28	7
31	N Frenkel (ISR)	28	30	29	27	26-T.10	6
2	Kim S-w (KOR)	29	29	28	27	28-T.9	5

Round of 16
18	B Tümer (TUR)	27	28	29	26	28	7
31	N Frenkel (ISR)	27	29	27	25	27	3

=== Finals ===
Quarter-finals
1	Seo M-g (KOR)	28	27	28	28	30-T.10	5
9	Feng H (CHN)	27	26	30	30	30-T.10+	6
12	M Wieser (GER)	28	25	28	0
13	Qin WY (CHN)	29	27	29	6
3	Tang C-c (TPE)	29	28	28	24	29	6
22	J Vetter (GER)	28	28	29	27	27	4
10	M Borsani (ITA)	28	27	24	27	28-T.9	5
18	B Tümer (TUR)	26	29	29	27	28-T.10	6

Semi-finals
9	Feng H (CHN)	25	27	27	30	29-T.9	5
13	Qin WY (CHN)	29	27	28	27	28-T.10	6
3	Tang C-c (TPE)	30	29	29	6
18	B Tümer (TUR)	27	26	28	0

Gold medal match
13	Qin WY (CHN)	28	25	29	28	27-T.8	5
3	Tang C-c (TPE)	27	30	28	30	27-T.10	6
Bronze medal match
9	Feng H (CHN)	28	27	27	28	27	4
18	B Tümer (TUR)	28	27	30	27	29	6
