= Archery at the 2019 European Games – Men's individual recurve =

Men's individual recurve at the 2019 European Games
- Venue: Olympic Sports Complex
- Date: 21–27 June
- Competitors: 48 from 32 nations

Medalists
gold medal	Mauro Nespoli	Italy
silver medal	Steve Wijler	Netherlands
bronze medal	Pablo Acha	Spain

The men's individual recurve competition at the 2019 European Games was held from 21 to 27 June 2019 at the Olympic Sports Complex in Minsk, Belarus.

48 archers entered the competition, with a maximum of three entries per country.

== Records ==
Prior to the competition, the existing world, European and Games records were as follows:

- 72 arrow ranking round

World record	Kim Woo-jin (KOR)	700	Rio de Janeiro, Brazil	5 August 2016
European record	Mauro Nespoli (ITA)	689	Antalya, Turkey	2 May 2012
Games record	Mauro Nespoli (ITA)	683	Baku, Azerbaijan	16 June 2015

== Ranking round ==
The ranking round took place on 21 June 2019 to determine the seeding for the knockout rounds. It consisted of two rounds of 36 arrows, with a maximum score of 720.

Rank	Archer	Nation	Score	10s	Xs
1	Mete Gazoz	Turkey	685 GR	44	18
2	Pierre Plihon	France	684	40	15
3	Sjef van den Berg	Netherlands	679	34	15
4	Mauro Nespoli	Italy	678	36	12
5	Thomas Chirault	France	675	35	16
6	Pablo Acha	Spain	675	35	12
7	Miguel Alvariño	Spain	674	33	9
8	Yuriy Havelko	Ukraine	668	31	13
9	Jan van Tongeren	Netherlands	668	30	9
10	Steve Wijler	Netherlands	667	32	10
11	Patrick Huston	Great Britain	666	32	10
12	Jean-Charles Valladont	France	665	29	9
13	Galsan Bazarzhapov	Russia	665	28	9
14	Dan Olaru	Moldova	662	25	7
15	Andreas Gstöttner	Austria	661	30	8
16	Florian Faber	Switzerland	661	29	7
17	Tom Hall	Great Britain	661	25	10
18	Daniel Castro	Spain	660	25	9
19	Pit Klein	Luxembourg	653	20	7
20	Marco Galiazzo	Italy	651	21	8
21	Kiryl Firsau	Belarus	650	22	8
22	Erik Ebermann	Czech Republic	648	23	6
23	Jaba Moseshvili	Georgia	648	22	4
24	Alexander Wise	Great Britain	648	21	9
25	Rok Bizjak	Slovenia	648	19	10
26	Árpád Banda	Hungary	647	22	8
27	Arsalan Baldanov	Russia	647	20	6
28	Cedric Rieger	Germany	646	20	9
29	Alexandros Karageorgiou	Greece	645	30	10
30	Jeff Henckels	Luxembourg	645	20	4
31	Pavel Dalidovich	Belarus	644	21	5
32	Ludvig Flink	Sweden	641	17	8
33	Mimis El Helali	Cyprus	640	18	3
34	Itay Shanny	Israel	639	21	4
35	Jarno De Smedt	Belgium	638	21	5
36	Samuli Piippo	Finland	638	18	5
37	Vitalii Popov	Russia	637	17	8
38	Aliaksandr Liahusheu	Belarus	636	18	1
39	Ivan Banchev	Bulgaria	635	23	7
40	Kacper Sierakowski	Poland	630	16	4
41	David Pasqualucci	Italy	629	20	12
42	Matija Mihalić	Croatia	626	13	9
43	Jacopo Forlani	San Marino	621	16	9
44	Jānis Bružis	Latvia	619	20	7
45	Märt Oona	Estonia	616	17	3
46	Joe Klein	Luxembourg	607	13	4
47	Vladimír Hurban	Slovakia	604	8	2
48	Jurgen Hoxha	Albania	556	8	1

== Elimination rounds ==
=== Finals ===
Semifinals
41	David Pasqualucci (ITA)	5^{9}	27	28	29	24	28
4	Mauro Nespoli (ITA)	6^{9*}	29	28	28	29	27
6	Pablo Acha (ESP)	3	26	30	19	27	25
10	Steve Wijler (NED)	7	28	28	25	27	29

Final
4	Mauro Nespoli (ITA)	6	28	27	28	26	30
10	Steve Wijler (NED)	4	28	26	28	27	28
Third place
41	David Pasqualucci (ITA)	1	26	27	21	29
6	Pablo Acha (ESP)	7	29	27	26	30

=== Section 1 ===
Round of 64
33	El Helali (CYP)	0	20	26	23
32	Flink (SWE)	6	28	28	27
17	Hall (GBR)	6	28	25	26
48	Hoxha (ALB)	0	25	16	22
41	Pasqualucci (ITA)	6^{10}	25	26	28	28	25
24	Wise (GBR)	5^{6}	30	28	26	28	23
25	Bizjak (SLO)	2	17	28	28	22
40	Sierakowski (POL)	6	26	17	29	28

Round of 32
1	Gazoz (TUR)	6	30	28	27
32	Flink (SWE)	0	23	26	25
17	Hall (GBR)	4	26	27	29	24	29
16	Faber (SUI)	6	26	28	27	27	29
9	Van Tongern (NED)	3	26	27	26	29	27
41	Pasqualucci (ITA)	7	28	27	26	29	28
40	Sierakowski (POL)	6	26	27	25	27
8	Havelko (UKR)	2	28	26	17	21

Round of 16
1	Gazoz (TUR)	2	25	25	30	25
16	Faber (SUI)	6	27	29	28	27
41	Pasqualucci (ITA)	7	27	28	28	28
40	Sierakowski (POL)	1	27	23	25	22

Quarterfinals
16	Faber (SUI)	0	26	26	27
41	Pasqualucci (ITA)	6	27	27	28

=== Section 2 ===
Round of 64
37	Popov (RUS)	2	25	24	28	26
28	Rieger (GER)	6	26	27	25	29
21	Firsau (BLR)	7	24	26	24	25
44	Bružis (LAT)	1	24	22	18	24
45	Oona (EST)	1	23	27	27	22
20	Galiazzo (ITA)	7	28	28	27	29
29	Karageorgiou (GRE)	6	24	23	27
36	Piippo (FIN)	0	19	21	25

Round of 32
5	Chirault (FRA)	6	28	27	28	28	25
28	Rieger (GER)	4	27	27	28	28	25
21	Firsau (BLR)	2	27	29	26	26
12	Valladont (FRA)	6	28	26	27	28
13	Bazarzhapov (RUS)	6	28	27	27	28	29
20	Galiazzo (ITA)	4	25	17	28	29	27
29	Karageorgiou (GRE)	3	23	25	28	22	21
4	Nespoli (ITA)	7	21	28	28	29	28

Round of 16
5	Chirault (FRA)	0	24	26	25
12	Valladont (FRA)	6	26	28	26
13	Bazarzhapov (RUS)	2	27	24	26	26
4	Nespoli (ITA)	6	28	19	27	28

Quarterfinals
12	Valladont (FRA)	0	24	26	26
4	Nespoli (ITA)	6	27	28	27

=== Section 3 ===
Round of 64
35	De Smedt (BEL)	5^{8}	22	30	25	26	25
30	Henckels (LUX)	6^{8*}	25	23	25	26	25
19	P. Klein (LUX)	2	25	24	27	21
46	J. Klein (LUX)	6	28	27	25	25
43	Forlani (SMR)	6	22	23	26	24	27
22	Ebermann (CZE)	4	21	27	25	25	24
27	Baldanov (RUS)	2	28	24	25	25
38	Liahusheu (BLR)	6	26	25	26	28

Round of 32
3	Van den Berg (NED)	6	27	25	25	28
30	Henckels (LUX)	2	26	30	24	27
46	J. Klein (LUX)	0	26	24	24
14	Olaru (MDA)	6	29	26	28
11	Huston (GBR)	6	27	26	27	27
43	Forlani (SMR)	2	30	24	24	26
38	Liahusheu (BLR)	0	26	26	26
6	Acha (ESP)	6	28	28	28

Round of 16
3	Van den Berg (NED)	5^{9}	28	28	26	27	25
14	Olaru (MDA)	6^{10}	26	25	27	28	25
11	Huston (GBR)	0	27	26	28
6	Acha (ESP)	6	28	28	30

Quarterfinals
14	Olaru (MDA)	2	27	29	28	27
6	Acha (ESP)	6	28	25	29	28

=== Section 4 ===
Round of 64
39	Banchev (BUL)	2	25	25	28	25
26	Banda (HUN)	6	30	25	28	26
23	Moseshvili (GEO)	2	20	26	26	23
42	Mihalić (CRO)	6	26	22	27	24
47	Hurban (SVK)	4	19	23	27	28	26
18	Castro (ESP)	6	28	28	25	27	28
31	Dalidovich (BLR)	6	25	29	24	30
34	Shanny (ISR)	2	20	25	28	28

Round of 32
7	Alvariño (ESP)	3	22	27	26	25	26
26	Banda (HUN)	7	27	27	28	24	28
42	Mihalić (CRO)	1	27	24	24	25
10	Wijler (NED)	7	27	28	27	28
15	Gstöttner (AUT)	2	24	26	27	28
18	Castro (ESP)	6	24	28	29	28
31	Dalidovich (BLR)	6	28	28	26	25	24
2	Plihon (FRA)	4	30	27	26	25	23

Round of 16
26	Banda (HUN)	5^{8}	28	27	25	27	26
10	Wijler (NED)	6^{9}	28	28	23	26	28
18	Castro (ESP)	2	25	26	21	26
31	Dalidovich (BLR)	6	27	24	25	28

Quarterfinals
10	Wijler (NED)	7	27	29	28	28
31	Dalidovich (BLR)	1	24	27	28	27
