= Archery at the 2020 Summer Olympics – Men's team =

Men's team at the Games of the XXXII Olympiad
- Archery pictogram
- Venue: Yumenoshima Park
- Date: 23 July (ranking round); 26 July (match play)
- Competitors: 36 from 12 nations

Medalists
1st place, gold medalist(s)		Kim Woo-jin; Oh Jin-hyek; Kim Je-deok	South Korea
2nd place, silver medalist(s)		Deng Yu-cheng; Tang Chih-chun; Wei Chun-heng	Chinese Taipei
3rd place, bronze medalist(s)		Takaharu Furukawa; Yuki Kawata; Hiroki Muto	Japan

The men's team archery event was one of five archery events held at the 2020 Summer Olympics. It was held at Yumenoshima Park, in Tokyo, Japan, with the ranking round taking place on 23 July and match play on 26 July.

== Background ==
This was the 9th consecutive Olympic appearance of the event, which has been held every Games since 1988.

Of the 12 teams that competed in 2016, 8 qualified to return, including all four semifinalists (winner South Korea, silver medalist the United States, bronze medalist Australia, and fourth-place finisher China). The other teams from 2016 that qualified to return were the Netherlands, France, Indonesia, and Chinese Taipei. Kazakhstan qualified to return for the first time since 2000; Japan, Great Britain, and India competed in 2012.

South Korea had a 6-Games medal streak in the event, and had won gold 5 of the 8 times the event had been held. China was the reigning world champion, having defeated South Korea in the semifinals at the 2019 World Archery Championships.

== Qualification ==
12 teams qualify for the men's team archery event. The top 8 National Olympic Committees (NOCs) at the 2019 World Archery Championships qualified. One place was reserved for the host, Japan; the 2021 Archery Final Olympic Qualification Tournament would award either three or four places depending on whether Japan qualified through the World Championships. Because Japan did not, there were three places available at the Final OQT.

Teams that qualified for the team event also received 3 automatic qualification places for the team members in the individual event as well.

== Competition format ==
As with the other archery events, the men's team was a recurve archery event, held under the World Archery-approved 70-meter distance and rules. 12 teams of 3 archers each participate. Competition begins with a ranking round, in which each archer shoots 72 arrows (this is the same ranking round used for the individual event). The combined scores from the ranking round are used to seed the teams into a single-elimination bracket, with the top 4 teams receiving a bye into the second round (quarterfinals). Each match consists of four sets of 6 arrows, two per archer. The team with the highest score in the set – the total of the six arrows – receives two set points; if the teams are tied, each receives one set point. The first team to five set points wins the match. If the match is tied at 4–4 after 4 sets, a tie-breaker set is used with each archer on the team shooting one arrow; if the score of the tie-breaker set remains tied, the closest arrow to the center wins.

== Records ==
Prior to this competition, the existing world and Olympic records were as follows.

- 216 arrow ranking round

World record	South Korea; Im Dong-hyun, Kim Bub-min, Oh Jin-hyek	2087	London, United Kingdom	27 July 2012
Olympic record	South Korea; Im Dong-hyun, Kim Bub-min, Oh Jin-hyek	2087	London, United Kingdom	27 July 2012

== Schedule ==
All times are Japan Standard Time (UTC+9)

The schedule for the men's team event covers two separate days of competition.

Date	Time	Round
Friday, 23 July 2021	13:00	Ranking round
Monday, 26 July 2021	9:30; 13:45; 15:17; 16:15; 16:40	1/8 finals Quarter-finals; Semi-finals; Bronze medal match Gold medal match

== Results ==
=== Ranking round ===
Rank	Nation	Archers	Score	10s	Xs
1	South Korea	Kim Woo-jin; Oh Jin-hyek; Kim Je-deok	2049	119	56
2	Netherlands	Gijs Broeksma; Steve Wijler; Sjef van den Berg	2012	96	35
3	China	Li Jialun; Wang Dapeng; Wei Shaoxuan	2011	94	25
4	Japan	Takaharu Furukawa; Yuki Kawata; Hiroki Muto	1988	86	23
5	United States	Jack Williams; Brady Ellison; Jacob Wukie	1987	89	29
6	Chinese Taipei	Deng Yu-cheng; Tang Chih-chun; Wei Chun-heng	1985	83	25
7	Indonesia	Riau Ega Agatha; Arif Dwi Pangestu; Alviyanto Prastyadi	1979	81	27
8	Kazakhstan	Denis Gankin; Sanzhar Mussayev; Ilfat Abdullin	1973	83	31
9	India	Atanu Das; Pravin Jadhav; Tarundeep Rai	1961	72	18
10	Great Britain	Tom Hall; Patrick Huston; James Woodgate	1959	67	27
11	Australia	David Barnes; Ryan Tyack; Taylor Worth	1949	69	27
12	France	Thomas Chirault; Pierre Plihon; Jean-Charles Valladont	1941	65	22

=== Competition bracket ===
1/8 eliminations
9	India	6	55	52	56	55
8	Kazakhstan	2	54	51	57	54
5	United States	6	52	55	58
12	France	0	51	45	54
11	Australia	4	53	53	57	52	27
6	Chinese Taipei	5	48	55	55	58	28
7	Indonesia	0	51	52	51
10	Great Britain	6	55	53	55

Quarter-finals
1	South Korea	6	59	59	56
9	India	0	54	57	54
5	United States	1	52	53	53
4	Japan	5	55	53	55
3	China	1	55	50	54
6	Chinese Taipei	5	55	54	56
10	Great Britain	3	54	57	50	54
2	Netherlands	5	54	56	54	57

Semi-finals
1	South Korea	5	58	54	58	53	28+
4	Japan	4	54	55	55	56	28
6	Chinese Taipei	6	56	54	59
2	Netherlands	0	53	52	55

Gold medal match
1	South Korea	6	59	60	56
6	Chinese Taipei	0	55	58	55
Bronze medal match
4	Japan	5	55	54	53	57	28+
2	Netherlands	4	58	52	57	56	28

- The figure in italics signifies the set scores.
