= Archery at the 2020 Summer Olympics =

Archery at the Games of the XXXII Olympiad
- Archery pictogram at the 2020 Summer Olympics
- Venue: Yumenoshima Park
- Dates: 23–31 July 2021
- No. of events: 5
- Competitors: 128 from 51 nations

The archery events at the 2020 Summer Olympics in Tokyo took place in Yumenoshima Park. Five events were planned with a mixed team event staged for the first time.

The 2020 Olympics were postponed to 2021 due to the COVID-19 pandemic.

== Qualification ==
There were 128 qualifying places available for archery at the 2020 Summer Olympics: 64 for men and 64 for women. The qualification standards were released by World Archery in March 2018.

Each National Olympic Committee (NOC) is permitted to enter a maximum of six competitors, three per gender. NOCs that qualify teams for a particular gender are able to send a three-member team to the team event and also have each member compete in the individual event. There are 12 team spots for each gender, thus qualifying 36 individuals through team qualification. All other NOCs may earn a maximum of one quota place per gender for the individual events.

Six places were reserved for Japan as the host nation, and a further four were to be decided by the Tripartite Commission. The remaining 118 places were then to be allocated through a qualification process, in which archers earned quota places for their respective NOCs, though not necessarily for themselves.

There was no qualification process prior to the 2020 Games for the mixed team event. Instead, qualification for that event was done through the ranking rounds at the beginning of the Games. Each NOC that had qualified at least one man and one woman would have the scores of that NOC's top-scoring man and top-scoring woman in the ranking round summed; the top 16 NOCs were to qualify for mixed team competition.

== Competition format ==
A total of 128 athletes are expected across the five events: the men's individual, women's individual, men's team, women's team and mixed team. The mixed team event is a new event added for 2020.

All five events are scheduled to be recurve archery events, held under the World Archery-approved 70-meter distance and rules. The competition is expected to start with an initial ranking round involving all 64 archers of each gender. Each archer is to shoot a total of 72 arrows to be seeded from 1–64 according to their score.

The ranking round is also to be used to seed the men's and women's teams from 1 to 12, by aggregating the individual scores for the members of each team. In addition, the ranking round is scheduled to determine the 16 pairs that qualify for the mixed team event (for nations that have both men and women competing, the top men's score and the top women's score are combined) as well as seeding those 16 teams.

Each event was played in a single-elimination tournament format, except for the semi-final losers, who played off to decide the bronze medal winner.

=== Individual events ===
In the individual events, all 64 competitors entered the competition at the first round, the round of 64. The draw was seeded according to the result of the ranking round so the first seed shot against the 64th seed in the first round.

Each match is to be scored using the Archery Olympic Round, consisting of the best-of-five sets, with three arrows per set. The winner of each set receives two points, and if the scores in the set are tied then each archer receives one point. If at the end of five sets the score is tied at 5–5, a single arrow shoot-off is held and the closest to the center is declared the winner.

=== Men's and women's team events ===
In the team events, the top four seeded teams from the ranking round are to receive a bye to the quarter-final. The remaining eight teams, seeded 5th to 12th, compete for the remaining four places in the quarter-finals.

The team event follows the same Archery Olympic Round set system as the individual event, though each set consists of six arrows (two per team member) and only four sets are held.

=== Mixed team event ===
In the mixed team event, the top 16 seeded teams from the ranking round competed in a single-elimination bracket.

As with the men's and women's team events, the set system uses two arrows per team member (four arrows per team in mixed team) and four sets.

== Schedule ==
All times are Japan Standard Time (UTC+9).

Day	Date	Start	Finish	Event	Phase
Day 0	Friday 23 July 2021	9:00	11:00	Women's individual	Ranking round
Day 0	Friday 23 July 2021	13:00	15:00	Men's individual	Ranking round
Day 1	Saturday 24 July 2021	9:30	12:05	Mixed team	Round of 16
Day 1	Saturday 24 July 2021	14:15	17:25	Mixed team	Eliminations Rounds/Medal Rounds
Day 2	Sunday 25 July 2021	9:30	11:05	Women's team	Round of 16
Day 2	Sunday 25 July 2021	13:45	17:25	Women's team	Eliminations Rounds/Medal Rounds
Day 3	Monday 26 July 2021	9:30	11:05	Men's team	Round of 16
Day 3	Monday 26 July 2021	13:45	17:25	Men's team	Eliminations Rounds/Medal Rounds
Day 4	Tuesday 27 July 2021	9:30	13:25	Men's individual	Round of 64/Round of 32
Day 4	Tuesday 27 July 2021	9:30	13:25	Women's individual	Round of 64/Round of 32
Day 4	Tuesday 27 July 2021	16:00	19:55	Men's individual	Round of 64/Round of 32
Day 4	Tuesday 27 July 2021	16:00	19:55	Women's individual	Round of 64/Round of 32
Day 5	Wednesday 28 July 2021	9:30	13:25	Men's individual	Round of 64/Round of 32
Day 5	Wednesday 28 July 2021	9:30	13:25	Women's individual	Round of 64/Round of 32
Day 5	Wednesday 28 July 2021	16:00	18:40	Men's individual	Round of 64/Round of 32
Day 5	Wednesday 28 July 2021	16:00	18:40	Women's individual	Round of 64/Round of 32
Day 6	Thursday 29 July 2021	9:30	13:25	Men's individual	Round of 64/Round of 32
Day 6	Thursday 29 July 2021	9:30	13:25	Women's individual	Round of 64/Round of 32
Day 6	Thursday 29 July 2021	16:00	18:40	Men's individual	Round of 64/Round of 32
Day 6	Thursday 29 July 2021	16:00	18:40	Women's individual	Round of 64/Round of 32
Day 7	Friday 30 July 2021	9:30	11:15	Women's individual	Round of 16
Day 7	Friday 30 July 2021	14:45	17:20	Women's individual	Elimination Rounds/Medal rounds
Day 8	Saturday 31 July 2021	9:30	11:15	Men's individual	Round of 16
Day 8	Saturday 31 July 2021	14:45	17:20	Men's individual	Elimination Rounds/Medal rounds

== Participating nations ==
128 archers from 51 nations qualified. Qualification tournaments include the 2019 World Archery Championships, various continental events, and a final qualification tournament.

- Australia (4)
- Bangladesh (2)
- Belarus (3)
- Belgium (1)
- Bhutan (1)
- Brazil (2)
- Canada (2)
- Chad (1)
- Chile (1)
- China (6)
- Colombia (2)
- Czech Republic (1)
- Denmark (1)
- Ecuador (1)
- Egypt (2)
- Estonia (1)
- Finland (1)
- France (4)
- Germany (4)
- Great Britain (6)
- India (4)
- Indonesia (4)
- Iran (1)
- Israel (1)
- Italy (4)
- Japan (6) Host
- Kazakhstan (3)
- Luxembourg (1)
- Malawi (1)
- Malaysia (2)
- Mexico (4)
- Moldova (2)
- Mongolia (2)
- Netherlands (4)
- Poland (2)
- ROC (4)
- Romania (2)
- Slovakia (1)
- Slovenia (1)
- South Korea (6)
- Spain (2)
- Sweden (1)
- Chinese Taipei (6)
- Tunisia (2)
- Turkey (2)
- Ukraine (3)
- United States (6)
- Vietnam (2)
- Virgin Islands (1)

== Records ==
Event	Round	Name	Nation	Score	Date	Record
Women's individual	Ranking round	An San	South Korea	680	23 July	OR
Women's team	Ranking round	An San, Jang Min-hee, Kang Chae-young	South Korea	2032	23 July	OR
Mixed team	Ranking round	Kim Je-deok, An San	South Korea	1368	24 July	OR

== Medal summary ==
=== Medal table ===
* Host nation (Japan)

Rank	NOC	Gold	Silver	Bronze	Total
1	South Korea	4	0	0	4
2	Turkey	1	0	0	1
3	ROC	0	2	0	2
4	Italy	0	1	1	2
5	Chinese Taipei	0	1	0	1
5	Netherlands	0	1	0	1
7	Japan*	0	0	2	2
8	Germany	0	0	1	1
8	Mexico	0	0	1	1
Totals (9 entries)		5	5	5	15

=== Medalists ===
Event	Gold	Silver	Bronze
Men's individual	Mete Gazoz; Turkey	Mauro Nespoli; Italy	Takaharu Furukawa; Japan
Men's team	South Korea; Kim Woo-jin; Oh Jin-hyek; Kim Je-deok	Chinese Taipei; Deng Yu-cheng; Tang Chih-chun; Wei Chun-heng	Japan; Takaharu Furukawa; Yuki Kawata; Hiroki Muto
Women's individual	An San; South Korea	Elena Osipova; ROC	Lucilla Boari; Italy
Women's team	South Korea; An San; Jang Min-hee; Kang Chae-young	ROC; Svetlana Gomboeva; Elena Osipova; Ksenia Perova	Germany; Michelle Kroppen; Charline Schwarz; Lisa Unruh
Mixed team	South Korea; Kim Je-deok; An San	Netherlands; Steve Wijler; Gabriela Schloesser	Mexico; Luis Álvarez; Alejandra Valencia

== See also ==
- Archery at the 2018 Asian Games
- Archery at the 2018 Summer Youth Olympics
- Archery at the 2019 European Games
- Archery at the 2019 Pan American Games
- Archery at the 2020 Summer Paralympics
