= Luxembourg at the 2019 European Games =

- IOC code: LUX
- NOC: Luxembourg Olympic and Sporting Committee
- Website: teamletzebuerg.lu

in Minsk, Belarus 21 June 2019 – 30 June 2019
- Competitors: 25 in 9 sports
- Flag bearer: Robert Mann (badminton)
- Medals Ranked 38th: Gold 0 Silver 1 Bronze 2 Total 3

European Games appearances (overview)
- 2015; 2019; 2023; 2027

Luxembourg competed at the 2019 European Games, in Minsk, Belarus from 21 to 30 June 2019. Luxembourg has previously competed at the 2015 European Games in Baku, Azerbaijan. 25 athletes in 9 sports will represent Luxembourg in this edition of European Games.

== Medalists ==
Medal	Name	Sport	Event
Silver	Gilles Seywert	Archery	Men's individual compound
Bronze	Jennifer Warling	Karate	Women's kumite -55kg
Bronze	Ni Xialian	Table tennis	Women's singles

== Archery ==
Recurve

Athlete	Event	Ranking round		Round of 64	Round of 32	Round of 16	Quarterfinals	Semifinals	Final / BM	
Athlete	Event	Score	Seed	Opposition Score	Opposition Score	Opposition Score	Opposition Score	Opposition Score	Opposition Score	Rank
Pit Klein	Men's individual	653	19	J Klein (LUX); L 1–5	Did not advance					
Jeff Henckels	Men's individual	645	29	de Smedt (BEL); W 6–0	van den Berg (NED); L 1–5	Did not advance				
Joe Klein	Men's individual	607	46	P Klein (LUX); W 5–1	Olaru (MDA); L 4–0	Did not advance				
Pit Klein; Jeff Henckels; Joe Klein	Men's team	1905	8	—			France; L 2–3	Did not advance		5

Compound

Athlete	Event	Ranking round		Round of 16	Quarterfinals	Semifinals	Final / BM	
Athlete	Event	Score	Seed	Opposition Score	Opposition Score	Opposition Score	Opposition Score	Rank
Gilles Seywert	Men's individual	699	5	Vanek (CZE); W 144–142	Bulaev (RUS); W 144–143	Ravenscroft (GBR); W 140–138	Schloesser (NED); L 144–145	2nd place, silver medalist(s)

== Badminton ==
Athletes	Event	Group stage				Round of 16	Quarterfinals	Semifinals	Final	Rank
Athletes	Event	Opposition Score	Opposition Score	Opposition Score	Rank	Opposition Score	Opposition Score	Opposition Score	Opposition Score	Rank
Robert Mann	Men's singles	Malkov (RUS); L 17–21, 14–21	Filimon (ROU); L 21–13, 13–21, 16–21	Qowimuramadhoni (AZE); L 15–21, 18–21	4	Did not advance				

== Boxing ==
Men

Athlete	Event	Round of 32	Round of 16	Quarterfinals	Semifinals	Final	
Athlete	Event	Opposition Result	Opposition Result	Opposition Result	Opposition Result	Opposition Result	Rank
Michel Erpelding	91 kg	Begadze (GEO); L 0–5	Did not advance				
