= Archery at the 2020 Summer Olympics – Men's individual =

Men's individual at the Games of the XXXII Olympiad
- Venue: Yumenoshima Park
- Date: 23 July 2021 (ranking round); 27–29 July 2021 (match play); 31 July 2021 (finals)
- Competitors: 64 from 40 nations

Medalists
1st place, gold medalist(s)		Mete Gazoz	Turkey
2nd place, silver medalist(s)		Mauro Nespoli	Italy
3rd place, bronze medalist(s)		Takaharu Furukawa	Japan

The men's individual archery event was one of five archery events at the 2020 Summer Olympics. It was held at Yumenoshima Park, in Tokyo, Japan. There were 64 competitors from 40 nations, with nations having either 1 or 3 archers.

== Background ==
This was the 13th consecutive Olympic appearance of the event, which has been held every Games since archery returned to the Olympic program in 1972.

Six of the 8 quarterfinalists from the 2016 Games returned: silver medalist Jean-Charles Valladont of France, bronze medalist Brady Ellison of the United States, fourth-place finisher Sjef van den Berg of the Netherlands, and quarterfinalists Mauro Nespoli of Italy, Taylor Worth of Australia, and Takaharu Furukawa of Japan. Furukawa had been the silver medalist in 2012. Ellison was the world record holder for the 72-arrow ranking round as well as the 2019 World Champion.

== Qualification ==
64 archers qualify for the men's archery events. The 12 National Olympic Committees (NOCs) that qualify for the men's team event (including the host, Japan) enter the 3 team members in the individual event as well. Otherwise, NOCs may qualify a maximum of 1 archer in men's individual. There are quota spots available at various tournaments, including the World Championships, multiple continental events, and a final qualification tournament. There are also two Tripartite Commission invitational spots.

== Competition format ==
As with the other archery events, the men's individual is a recurve archery event, held under the World Archery-approved 70-meter distance and rules. Competition begins with a ranking round, in which each archer shoots 72 arrows. The scores from the ranking round are used to seed the archers into a single-elimination bracket. The knockout matches used the set system introduced in 2012. Each match consists of up to 5 sets of 3 arrows per archer. The archer with the best score in each set wins the set, earning 2 points. If the score is tied, each archer receives 1 point. The first archer to 6 points wins the match. If the match is tied 5–5 after 5 sets, a single tie-breaker arrow is to be used with the closest to center winning.

== Records ==
Prior to the competition, the world and Olympic records were as follows.

- 72 arrow ranking round

World record	Brady Ellison (USA)	702	Lima, Peru	7 August 2019
Olympic record	Kim Woo-jin (KOR)	700	Rio de Janeiro, Brazil	5 August 2016

== Schedule ==
All times are Japan Standard Time (UTC+9)

The schedule for the men's individual event covers five separate days of competition.

Date	Time	Round
Friday, 23 July 2021	13:00	Ranking round
Tuesday, 27 July 2021; Wednesday, 28 July 2021; Thursday, 29 July 2021	9:30; 16:00	1/32 finals 1/16 finals
Saturday, 31 July 2021	9:30; 14:45; 15:45; 16:30; 16:44	1/8 finals Quarter-finals; Semi-finals; Bronze medal match Gold medal match

== Results ==
=== Ranking round ===
The ranking round was held on 23 July 2021.

Rank	Archer	Nation	10s	Xs	Score
1	Kim Je-deok	South Korea	43	15	688
2	Brady Ellison	United States	41	14	682
3	Oh Jin-hyek	South Korea	39	18	681
4	Kim Woo-jin	South Korea	37	23	680
5	Hiroki Muto	Japan	37	12	678
6	Steve Wijler	Netherlands	37	9	675
7	Wei Shaoxuan	China	35	6	674
8	Sjef van den Berg	Netherlands	30	15	670
9	Denis Gankin	Kazakhstan	34	10	669
10	Mete Gazoz	Turkey	32	9	669
11	Li Jialun	China	31	9	669
12	Tang Chih-chun	Chinese Taipei	31	8	668
13	Wang Dapeng	China	28	10	668
14	Gijs Broeksma	Netherlands	29	11	667
15	Riau Ega Agatha	Indonesia	29	8	666
16	Crispin Duenas	Canada	27	7	665
17	Ruman Shana	Bangladesh	28	10	662
18	Andrés Aguilar	Chile	27	12	662
19	Luis Álvarez	Mexico	25	13	662
20	Khairul Anuar Mohamad	Malaysia	28	12	661
21	Wei Chun-heng	Chinese Taipei	26	8	661
22	Yuki Kawata	Japan	26	6	661
23	Nicholas D'Amour	Virgin Islands	30	12	660
24	Mauro Nespoli	Italy	28	10	658
25	Patrick Huston	Great Britain	28	9	658
26	Alviyanto Prastyadi	Indonesia	26	9	658
27	Ilfat Abdullin	Kazakhstan	27	9	657
28	Oleksii Hunbin	Ukraine	27	8	656
29	Jack Williams	United States	26	10	656
30	Deng Yu-cheng	Chinese Taipei	26	9	656
31	Pravin Jadhav	India	22	5	656
32	Arif Dwi Pangestu	Indonesia	26	10	655
33	Florian Unruh	Germany	23	6	654
34	Galsan Bazarzhapov	ROC	24	8	653
35	Atanu Das	India	24	7	653
36	Pierre Plihon	France	23	7	653
37	Tarundeep Rai	India	26	6	652
38	James Woodgate	Great Britain	21	11	652
39	Taylor Worth	Australia	23	8	651
40	Marcus Vinicius D'Almeida	Brazil	21	9	651
41	Žiga Ravnikar	Slovenia	21	8	651
42	Ryan Tyack	Australia	25	8	650
43	Jarno De Smedt	Belgium	23	7	650
44	Daniel Castro	Spain	21	6	650
45	Antti Vikström	Finland	26	6	649
46	Takaharu Furukawa	Japan	23	5	649
47	Jacob Wukie	United States	22	5	649
48	Tom Hall	Great Britain	18	7	649
49	Dan Olaru	Moldova	25	6	648
50	David Barnes	Australia	21	11	648
51	Thomas Chirault	France	21	7	648
52	Sanzhar Mussayev	Kazakhstan	22	12	647
53	Nguyễn Hoàng Phi Vũ	Vietnam	20	5	647
54	Otgonbold Baatarkhuyag	Mongolia	22	6	646
55	Jeff Henckels	Luxembourg	21	7	646
56	Youssof Tolba	Egypt	28	9	645
57	Jean-Charles Valladont	France	21	8	640
58	Daniel Pineda	Colombia	22	7	639
59	Sławomir Napłoszek	Poland	19	6	637
60	Itay Shanny	Israel	19	8	635
61	Mátyás László Balogh	Hungary	15	5	632
62	Mohamed Hammed	Tunisia	16	4	631
63	Milad Vaziri	Iran	18	4	629
64	Areneo David	Malawi	13	2	582

=== Competition bracket ===
==== Section 1 ====
Round of 64
1	Kim J-d (KOR)	6	30	27	28
64	A David (MAW)	0	24	25	20
33	F Unruh (GER)	6	28	26	28	27
32	A D Pangestu (INA)	2	24	28	24	25
17	R Shana (BAN)	7	28	27	27	25	29
48	T Hall (GBR)	3	28	25	26	27	27
49	D Olaru (MDA)	0	26	27	26
16	C Duenas (CAN)	6	27	28	27
9	D Gankin (KAZ)	6	26	27	24	25	27
56	Y Tolba (EGY)	4	23	23	25	27	24
41	Ž Ravnikar (SLO)	0	26	26	25
24	M Nespoli (ITA)	6	27	29	27
25	P Huston (GBR)	1	24	24	20	25
40	M D'Almeida (BRA)	7	24	27	27	27
57	J-C Valladont (FRA)	3	25	25	21	25	23
8	S v d Berg (NED)	7	24	26	24	25	26

Round of 32
1	Kim J-d (KOR)	3	30	27	27	26	28
33	F Unruh (GER)	7	28	27	28	27	29
17	R Shana (BAN)	4	26	25	27	27	25
16	C Duenas (CAN)	6	25	28	29	26	26
9	D Gankin (KAZ)	2	25	23	28	24
24	M Nespoli (ITA)	6	28	25	27	26
40	M D'Almeida (BRA)	7	27	29	28	26
8	S v d Berg (NED)	1	27	26	27	24

Round of 16
33	F Unruh (GER)	6	30	29	27	29
16	C Duenas (CAN)	2	26	26	29	28
24	M Nespoli (ITA)	6	29	28	29
40	M D'Almeida (BRA)	0	28	26	25

Quarter-finals
33	F Unruh (GER)	4	28	29	28	26	27
24	M Nespoli (ITA)	6	28	26	29	28	27

==== Section 2 ====
Round of 64
5	H Muto (JPN)	3	26	26	29	27	26
60	I Shanny (ISR)	7	28	29	25	27	27
37	T Rai (IND)	6	25	27	27	26	28
28	O Hunbin (UKR)	4	25	28	27	24	25
21	Wei C-h (TPE)	6	24	27	29	27
44	D Castro (ESP)	2	28	21	26	24
53	Nguyễn H P V (VIE)	1	25	24	27	22
12	Tang C-c (TPE)	7	25	26	29	26
13	Wang DP (CHN)	6	27	26	27	30	28
52	S Mussayev (KAZ)	4	27	28	27	28	27
45	A Vikström (FIN)	5^{9}	29	28	27	22	13
20	K Mohamad (MAS)	6^{10}	26	28	26	28	25
29	J Williams (USA)	4	26	26	28	28	27
36	P Plihon (FRA)	6	25	26	29	28	28
61	M L Balogh (HUN)	0	26	25	25
4	Kim W-j (KOR)	6	27	27	29

Round of 32
60	I Shanny (ISR)	6^{10}	28	26	27	27	28
37	T Rai (IND)	5^{9}	24	27	27	28	26
21	Wei C-h (TPE)	5^{9}	27	27	27	26	29
12	Tang C-c (TPE)	6^{10}	29	26	27	27	27
13	Wang DP (CHN)	5^{9}	28	28	26	26	27
20	K Mohamad (MAS)	6^{10}	25	28	27	29	26
36	P Plihon (FRA)	2	26	29	27	27
4	Kim W-j (KOR)	6	27	27	28	29

Round of 16
60	I Shanny (ISR)	5^{9}	26	23	27	27	28
12	Tang C-c (TPE)	6^{10}	27	29	27	26	26
20	K Mohamad (MAS)	0	27	27	29
4	Kim W-j (KOR)	6	30	30	30

Quarter-finals
12	Tang C-c (TPE)	6	28	29	27	28	28
4	Kim W-j (KOR)	4	28	27	28	28	27

==== Section 3 ====
Round of 64
3	Oh J-h (KOR)	6	27	27	29
62	M Hammed (TUN)	0	25	23	25
35	A Das (IND)	6	27	27	28	27	28
30	Deng Y-c (TPE)	4	26	28	26	28	26
19	L Álvarez (MEX)	3	26	23	27	26	27
46	T Furukawa (JPN)	7	23	30	29	26	29
51	T Chirault (FRA)	4	28	26	24	27	24
14	G Broeksma (NED)	6	26	24	27	30	27
11	Li JL (CHN)	6	25	27	24	28	25
54	O Baatarkhuyag (MGL)	4	27	27	21	24	25
43	J de Smedt (BEL)	6	29	28	28	25
22	Y Kawata (JPN)	2	28	29	24	23
27	I Abdullin (KAZ)	7	27	27	26	26	27
38	J Woodgate (GBR)	3	26	25	27	26	25
59	S Napłoszek (POL)	4	24	27	28	28	27
6	S Wijler (NED)	6	27	28	27	28	27

Round of 32
3	Oh J-h (KOR)	5^{9}	26	27	27	22	28
35	A Das (IND)	6^{10}	25	27	27	27	28
46	T Furukawa (JPN)	6^{10}	25	24	26	28	25
14	G Broeksma (NED)	5^{9}	24	25	26	25	29
11	Li JL (CHN)	6^{9}	26	26	29	25	25
43	J de Smedt (BEL)	5^{7}	24	26	26	27	26
27	I Abdullin (KAZ)	6	26	29	28	28	27
6	S Wijler (NED)	4	26	25	28	28	27

Round of 16
35	A Das (IND)	4	25	28	28	28	26
46	T Furukawa (JPN)	6	27	28	27	28	27
11	Li JL (CHN)	6^{10}	26	28	29	29	25
27	I Abdullin (KAZ)	5^{8}	27	27	26	29	27

Quarter-finals
46	T Furukawa (JPN)	6	29	29	29
11	Li JL (CHN)	0	26	26	26

==== Section 4 ====
Round of 64
7	Wei SX (CHN)	6	29	27	27
58	D Pineda (COL)	0	28	26	24
39	T Worth (AUS)	6	26	29	29
26	A Prastyadi (INA)	0	25	26	28
23	N D'Amour (ISV)	5^{8}	26	26	27	28	28
42	R Tyack (AUS)	6^{9}	27	29	27	25	26
55	J Henckels (LUX)	0	25	26	28
10	M Gazoz (TUR)	6	27	28	29
15	R E Agatha (INA)	7	27	28	26	29
50	D Barnes (AUS)	1	25	28	24	24
47	J Wukie (USA)	7	28	29	27	25
18	A Aguilar (CHI)	1	23	25	27	23
31	P Jadhav (IND)	6	29	28	28
34	G Bazarzhapov (ROC)	0	27	27	24
63	M Vaziri (IRI)	0	24	24	26
2	B Ellison (USA)	6	28	28	28

Round of 32
7	Wei SX (CHN)	4	28	27	27	27	23
39	T Worth (AUS)	6	28	24	28	27	27
42	R Tyack (AUS)	3	27	28	27	29	26
10	M Gazoz (TUR)	7	27	30	29	27	27
15	R E Agatha (INA)	5^{8}	19	28	30	26	28
47	J Wukie (USA)	6^{9}	28	28	27	27	24
31	P Jadhav (IND)	0	27	26	23
2	B Ellison (USA)	6	28	27	26

Round of 16
39	T Worth (AUS)	1	28	28	25	27
10	M Gazoz (TUR)	7	28	30	28	29
47	J Wukie (USA)	3	25	29	29	28	28
2	B Ellison (USA)	7	27	29	29	28	30

Quarter-finals
10	M Gazoz (TUR)	7	27	28	27	27	30
2	B Ellison (USA)	3	26	28	28	26	29

== Finals ==
Semi-finals
24	Mauro Nespoli (ITA)	6	29	28	28	29
12	Tang Chih-chun (TPE)	2	27	30	27	28
46	Takaharu Furukawa (JPN)	3	25	27	29	29	29
10	Mete Gazoz (TUR)	7	27	28	29	28	30

Gold medal match
24	Mauro Nespoli (ITA)	4	29	28	26	29	26
10	Mete Gazoz (TUR)	6	26	28	27	29	29
Bronze medal match
12	Tang Chih-chun (TPE)	3	28	29	28	28	28
46	Takaharu Furukawa (JPN)	7	29	27	28	29	29
