= Kim Je-deok =

South Korean archer (born 2004)

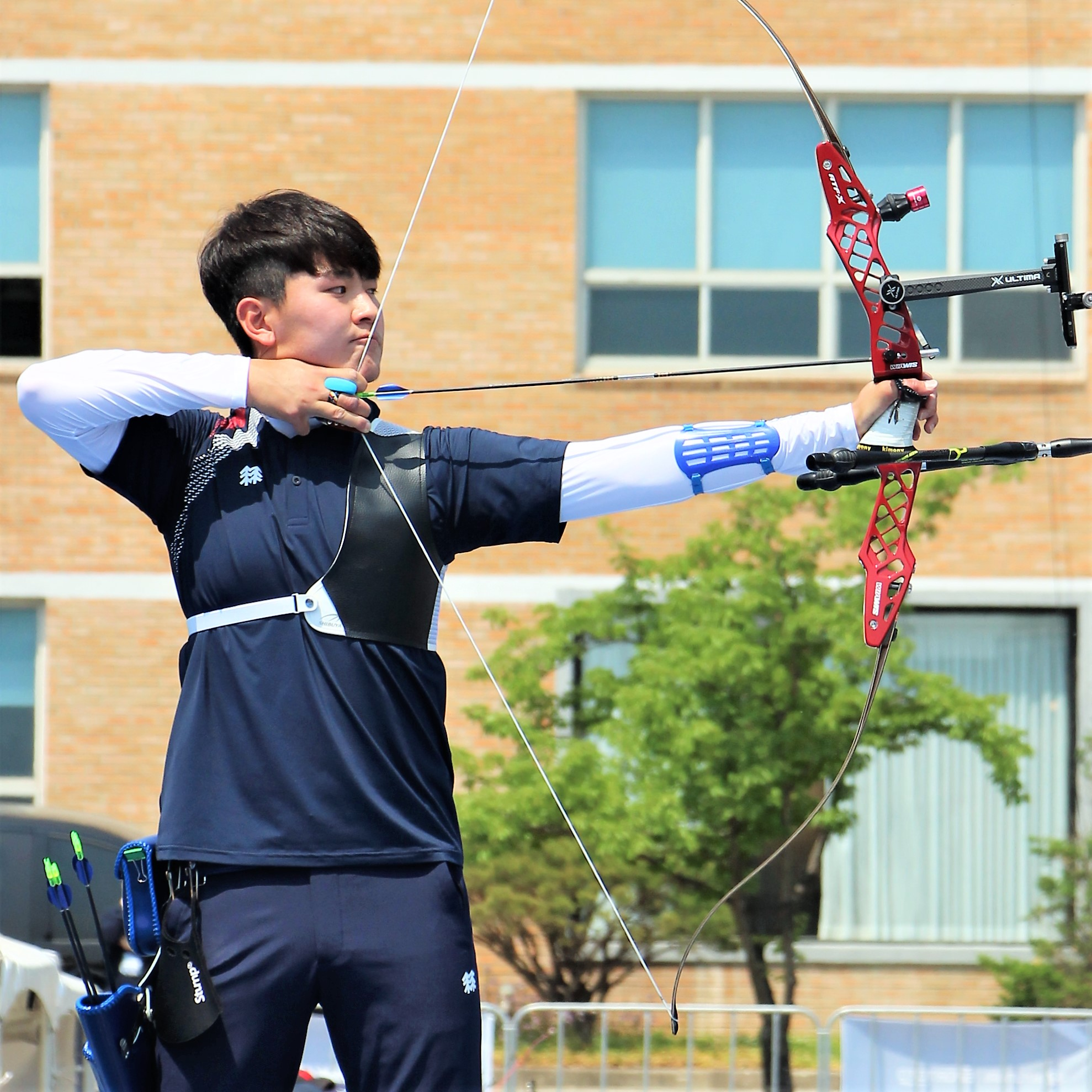
- Kim in 2022

Personal information
- Native name: 김제덕
- National team: South Korea
- Born: 12 April 2004 (age 22) Seoul, South Korea
- Education: Gyeongbuk Il High School
- Height: 176 cm (5 ft 9 in)
- Weight: 72 kg (159 lb)

Sport
- Country: South Korea
- Sport: Archery
- Rank: 9 (as of 15 October 2024)
- Event: Recurve
- Club: Gyeongbuk Il High School
- Coached by: Hwang Hyo-jin (club), Park Chae-soon (national), Hong Seung-jin (national)
Medal record
Men's recurve archery
Representing South Korea
Olympic Games
Gold medal – first place	2020 Tokyo	Team
Gold medal – first place	2020 Tokyo	Mixed team
Gold medal – first place	2024 Paris	Team
World Championships
Gold medal – first place	2021 Yankton	Team
Gold medal – first place	2023 Berlin	Team
Gold medal – first place	2025 Gwangju	Team
Bronze medal – third place	2025 Gwangju	Individual
Asian Games
Gold medal – first place	2022 Hangzhou	Team
Gold medal – first place	2026 Aichi–Nagoya	Team
Bronze medal – third place	2026 Aichi–Nagoya	Mixed team
Asian Championships
Gold medal – first place	2023 Bangkok	Team
World Youth Championships
Gold medal – first place	2019 Madrid	Team
Gold medal – first place	2019 Madrid	Mixed team
Bronze medal – third place	2019 Madrid	Individual

Kim Je-deok (Korean: 김제덕; born 12 April 2004) is a South Korean archer. He is a three-time Olympic gold medalist, winning in the mixed team and men's team events at the 2020 Summer Olympics as well as the men's team events at the 2024 Summer Olympics. He was the youngest archer competing at the 2020 Summer Olympics.

== Career ==
Kim got into archery in 2013 when he was nine. After an appearance on SBS's variety show Finding Genius in 2016 at the age of 12, he was nicknamed the "Archery Genius".

He participated in 2019 World Archery Youth Championships, receiving attention for winning a gold medal in the team event and mixed team event, as well as a bronze medal in the individual event.

At the end of 2019, in the national selection for the 2020 Tokyo Olympics, he placed 14th in the first round, but withdrew from the competition due to shoulder impingement syndrome. However, the postponement of the Tokyo Olympics by one year due to the COVID-19 pandemic would allow Kim to recover from his injury, and be able to participate again in the national team competition held in 2021. He participated in the national team selection at the Gwangju International Archery Center on 27 March 2021, succeeded in getting into the national team by placing 5th. Then, in the Tokyo Olympic national team selection match held on 23 April, he finished third and qualified for the Olympics.

At the 2020 Summer Olympics, Kim scored 688 points in the men’s ranking round, beating the world record holder Brady Ellison of the United States (682 points) to take first place. He was paired with An San in the mixed team competition. The two became Olympic Champions after defeating Steve Wijler and Gabriela Schloesser of the Netherlands in the final round. During the finals of the mixed team event, the rare 'Robin Hood arrow' was seen, when an arrow from An San penetrated the arrow shot by Kim Je-deok. The arrows were donated to the International Olympic Committee along with the uniforms of the two athletes and displayed at the IOC Olympic Museum in Lausanne, Switzerland. At the age of 17 years and 3 months, he became the youngest medalist in Korean men’s archery history. He also won a second gold medal in the men's team event, with his senior archers, Oh Jin-hyek and Kim Woo-jin. In his bid towards a triple crown during the individual round, he lost to Florian Unruh of Germany with a set score of 7-3 in the round of 32. Although he wasn't able to place himself on the individual podium, by the end of the Olympics, Kim Je Deok gained fame as the athlete who passionately cheered "Fighting" 15 different times to cheer for his teammates.

At the 2024 Summer Olympics, Kim won the gold medal in the men's team event with Kim Woo-jin and Lee Woo-seok.

== Awards and nominations ==
Name of the award ceremony, year presented, category, nominee of the award, and the result of the nomination
Award ceremony	Year	Category	Nominee / Work	Result	Ref.
Korea Image Award	2022	Sprout Award	Kim Je-deok	Won	
