= Itay Shanny =

Israeli archer (born 1998)

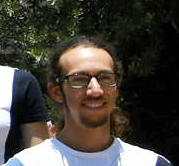

Personal information
- Native name: איתי שני
- Nationality: Israeli
- Born: 1 September 1998 (age 27)

Sport
- Sport: Archery

Achievements and titles
- Olympic finals: Round of 16 (2021)
Medal record
Men's recurve archery
Representing Israel
European Indoor Championships
Gold medal – first place	2026 Plovdiv	Team
Silver medal – second place	2024 Varaždin	Individual

Itay Shanny (Hebrew: איתי שני; born 1 September 1998) is an Israeli archer.

He represented Israel at the 2020 Summer Olympics competing in the men's individual event. Shanny was seeded 60th out of 64 in the ranking round. That rank placed him against 5th seeded Japanese Hiroki Muto in the first round. Shanny got the upset victory, beating his opponent 7–3. In the second round, facing 37th seed Indian Tarundeep Rai, Shanny won the match with a 10–9 single arrow shoot-off after the match was tied 5–5, advancing to the round of 16. There, he lost by a score of 6–5 to Taiwan's Tang Chih-chun and was eliminated from the competition.
