= Lam Dorji (archer) =

Bhutanese archer (born 1995)

Personal information
- Nationality: Bhutanese
- Born: 18 May 1995 (age 31) Samdrup Jongkhar, Bhutan

Sport
- Sport: Archery
Medal record
Men's archery
Representing Bhutan
South Asian Games
Bronze medal – third place	2019 Pokhara	Team recurve

Lam Dorji (born 18 May 1995) is a Bhutanese archer competing in recurve events. He competed at the 2024 Paris Olympics.

== Career ==
He started archery in 2012 after responding to an advertisement for the national archery team. He was coached by the Bhutan Archery Federation (BAF) and went on to compete at over 20 international competitions. He achieved his personal best score of 664 at the Asian Archery Championship in Bangkok in November 2023.

His performance in the final world qualifier in Antalya led to him being selected to compete at the 2024 Paris Olympics. In the individual ranking, he placed 28th out of the 64 competitors at the Games after scoring 663 points, one of his highest personal scores.

In September 2026, he competed for Bhutan at the 2026 Asian Games in Japan.

== Personal life ==
He is from Samdrup Jongkhar. He studied at the Royal Thimphu College.
