= Kao Wenchao =

Chinese archer (born 2000)

Personal information
- Born: 29 November 2000 (age 24); Shandong, China

Sport
- Country: China
- Sport: Archery
- Event: Recurve
- Coached by: Liu Xiyuan

Kao Wenchao (Chinese: 考文超, born 29 November 2000) is a Chinese archer competing in recurve events. He competed at the 2024 Paris Olympics.

== Career ==
He was a member is the Chinese team that reached the semi-final at the Archery World Cup stage 3 event in Antalya in June 2024, ultimately winning their bronze medal match.

He competed at the Archery at the 2024 Summer Olympics in the Men's team event. They reached the semi final with a win over Taiwan. The team then had consecutive defeats to South Korea in the semi final and Turkey in the bronze medal match to place fourth overall.
