= Milad Vaziri =

Iranian archer (born 1988)

Milad Vaziri Teymoorlooei (born 9 June 1988 in Tabriz, Iran) is an Iranian archer. He competed in the individual event at the 2012 and 2020 Summer Olympics.
