= Baatarkhuyagiin Otgonbold =

Mongolian archer (born 1996)

Personal information
- Nationality: Mongolia
- Born: Баатархуягийн Отгонболд; 20 December 1996 (age 29) Ulaanbaatar, Mongolia
- Height: 162 cm (5 ft 4 in)

Sport
- Country: Mongolia
- Sport: Archery

Achievements and titles
- Regional finals: (gold) (2023)
Medal record
Men's recurve archery
Representing Mongolia
Asian Games
Gold medal – first place	2022 Hangzhou	Individual
Military World Games
Gold medal – first place	2015 Mungyeong	Mixed team
Asian Cup
Gold medal – first place	2026 Bangkok	Mixed team

Baatarkhuyagiin Otgonbold (Mongolian: Баатархуягийн Отгонболд; born 20 December 1996) is a Mongolian archer. He competed in the men's individual event at the 2020 Summer Olympics. Otgonbold won a сhampion title at the 2022 Asian Games in the men's individual event, although the competition included the best world archers such as Oh Jin-hyek and Kim Woo-jin from South Korea, Takaharu Furukawa of Japan.
