= Steve Wijler =

Dutch archer (born 1996)

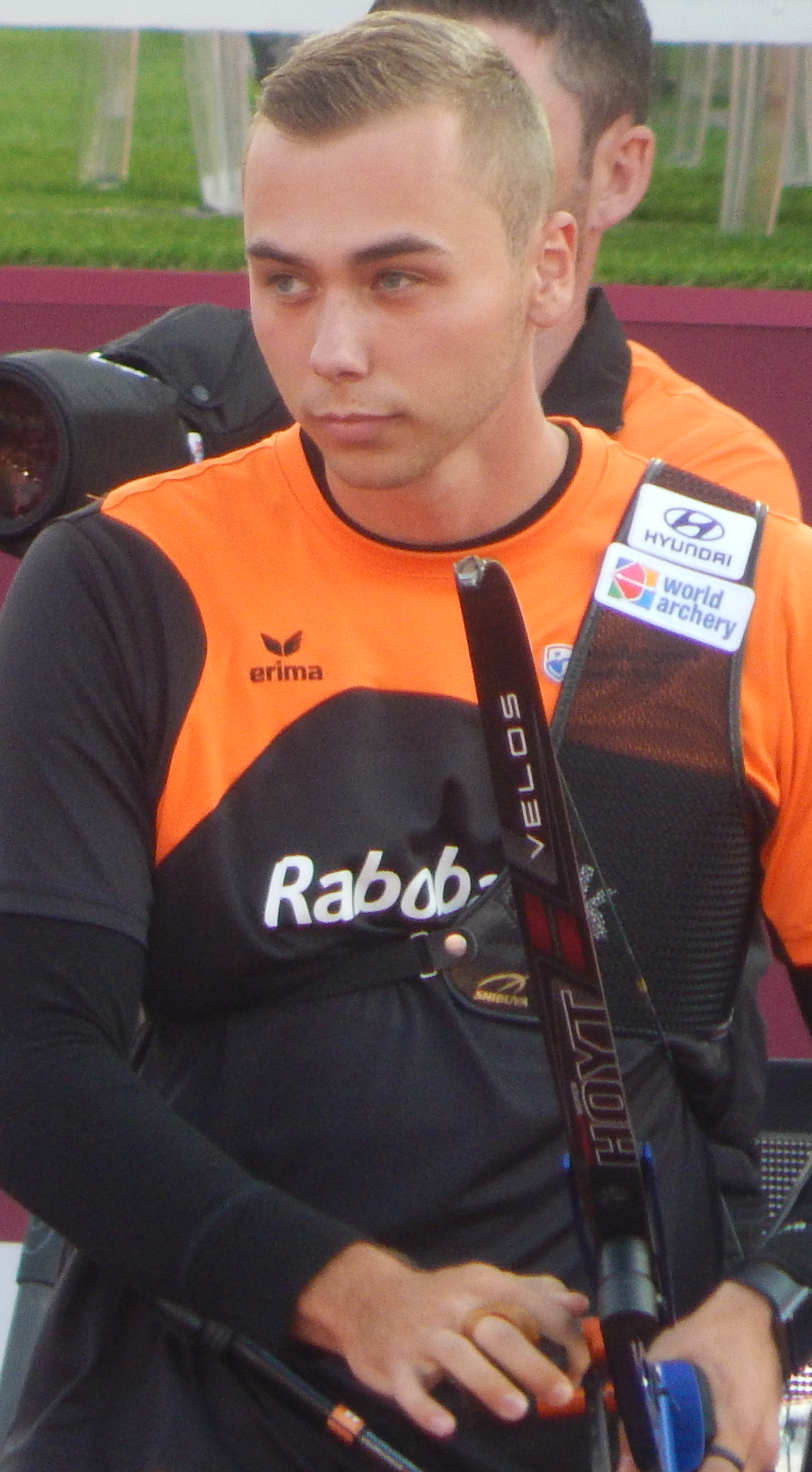
- Wijler in 2019

Personal information
- Full name: Steve Christina Hendrikus Wijler
- Born: 19 September 1996 (age 30) Horn, Netherlands

Sport
- Country: Netherlands
- Sport: Archery
- Event: Recurve
Medal record
Men's recurve archery
Representing Netherlands
Olympic Games
Silver medal – second place	2020 Tokyo	Mixed team
World Championships
Bronze medal – third place	2017 Mexico City	Individual
World Indoor Championships
Gold medal – first place	2018 Yankton	Team
European Championships
Gold medal – first place	2018 Legnica	Individual
Bronze medal – third place	2024 Essen	Mixed team
European Games
Silver medal – second place	2019 Minsk	Individual
Silver medal – second place	2019 Minsk	Team
World Cup
Gold medal – first place	2017 Shanghai	Individual
Gold medal – first place	2018 Salt Lake City	Team
Silver medal – second place	2017 Berlin	Team
Silver medal – second place	2018 Salt Lake City	Individual
Silver medal – second place	2019 Antalya	Individual
Bronze medal – third place	2019 Medellín	Team
Bronze medal – third place	2022 Antalya	Team
Bronze medal – third place	2023 Shanghai	Individual

Steve Wijler (born 19 September 1996) is a Dutch archer competing in men's recurve events. He won the bronze medal in the men's individual recurve event at the 2017 World Archery Championships held in Mexico City, Mexico. In 2021, Wijler and Gabriela Schloesser won the silver medal in the mixed team event at the 2020 Summer Olympics in Tokyo, Japan.

== Career ==
In 2018, Wijler won the gold medal in the men's team event at the World Indoor Archery Championships held in Yankton, United States. At the 2018 European Archery Championships in Legnica, Poland, he won the gold medal in the men's individual recurve event.

He represented the Netherlands at the 2019 European Games held in Minsk, Belarus and he won the silver medal in both the individual recurve and team recurve events.

In 2021, Wijler won the gold medal in the men's team recurve event at the European Archery Championships held in Antalya, Turkey. He also won the silver medal at the 2020 Summer Olympics in Tokyo, Japan in the mixed team event. He also competed in the men's individual and men's team events. Two months later, he competed at the 2021 World Archery Championships held in Yankton, United States.

In 2022, he won the men's recurve event at the Dutch National Indoor Archery Championships.

Wijler represented the Netherlands at the 2023 European Games held in Poland. He competed in the men's individual recurve, men's team recurve and mixed team recurve events. He also competed at the 2023 World Archery Championships held in Berlin, Germany.

Wijler and Laura van der Winkel won the bronze medal in the mixed team recurve event at the 2024 European Archery Championships held in Essen, Germany.

He also competed for the Netherlands at the 2024 Summer Olympics in the men's individual and men's team events.
