= Mohamed Hammed =

Tunisian archer (born 1987)

Personal information
- Nationality: Tunisian
- Born: 23 September 1987 (age 38)

Sport
- Sport: Archery
Medal record
Men's recurve archery
Representing Tunisia
African Games
| Silver medal – second place | 2019 Rabat | Individual |
| Silver medal – second place | 2019 Rabat | Team |

Mohamed Hammed (born 23 September 1987) is a Tunisian archer. He competed in the men's individual event at the 2020 Summer Olympics.

In 2019, he won the silver medal in the men's recurve event at the African Games held in Rabat, Morocco. He also won the silver medal in the men's team recurve event.
