= 2019 World Archery Championships =

2019 World Championships
- Location: 's-Hertogenbosch, Netherlands
- Dates: 10–16 June

The 2019 World Archery Championships were held in 's-Hertogenbosch, Netherlands from 10 to 16 June 2019.

The event served as a qualifier for the 2020 Summer Olympics, with each men's and women's team that made the quarter-finals earning three quota places for the respective team. There were also quota places for the top four individuals in the singles competition, for those who failed to get quotas in the team events.

== Medals table ==
* Host nation (Netherlands)

Rank	Nation	Gold	Silver	Bronze	Total
1	South Korea	3	2	3	8
2	Chinese Taipei	3	0	1	4
3	United States	2	2	0	4
4	China	1	0	0	1
4	Russia	1	0	0	1
6	India	0	1	2	3
7	Netherlands*	0	1	1	2
8	France	0	1	0	1
8	Malaysia	0	1	0	1
8	Norway	0	1	0	1
8	Turkey	0	1	0	1
12	Bangladesh	0	0	1	1
12	Great Britain	0	0	1	1
12	Italy	0	0	1	1
Totals (14 entries)		10	10	10	30

== Medals summary ==
=== Recurve ===
Event	Gold	Silver	Bronze
Men's individual	Brady Ellison; United States	Khairul Anuar Mohamad; Malaysia	Ruman Shana; Bangladesh
Women's individual	Lei Chien-ying; Chinese Taipei	Kang Chae-young; South Korea	Choi Mi-sun; South Korea
Men's team	China; Ding Yiliang; Feng Hao; Wei Shaoxuan	India; Atanu Das; Pravin Ramesh Jadhav; Tarundeep Rai	South Korea; Kim Woo-jin; Lee Seung-yun; Lee Woo-seok
Women's team	Chinese Taipei; Lei Chien-ying; Peng Chia-mao; Tan Ya-ting	South Korea; Chang Hye-jin; Choi Mi-sun; Kang Chae-young	United Kingdom; Sarah Bettles; Naomi Folkard; Bryony Pitman
Mixed team	South Korea; Lee Woo-seok; Kang Chae-young	Netherlands; Sjef van den Berg; Gabriela Bayardo	Italy; Mauro Nespoli; Vanessa Landi

=== Compound ===
Event	Gold	Silver	Bronze
Men's individual	James Lutz; United States	Anders Faugstad; Norway	Kim Jong-ho; South Korea
Women's individual	Natalia Avdeeva; Russia	Paige Pearce; United States	Jyothi Surekha Vennam; India
Men's team	South Korea; Choi Yong-hee; Kim Jong-ho; Yang Jae-won	Turkey; Süleyman Araz; Evren Çağıran; Muhammed Yetim	Netherlands; Peter Elzinga; Sil Pater; Mike Schloesser
Women's team	Chinese Taipei; Chen Li-ju; Chen Yi-hsuan; Huang I-jou	United States; Cassidy Cox; Paige Pearce; Alexis Ruiz	India; Raj Kaur; Muskan Kirar; Jyothi Surekha Vennam
Mixed team	South Korea; Kim Jong-ho; So Chae-won	France; Pierre-Julien Deloche; Sophie Dodemont	Chinese Taipei; Chen Chieh-lun; Chen Yi-hsuan
