= Sanzhar Mussayev =

Kazakhstani archer

Personal information
- Native name: Санжар Жумангельдиевич Мусаев
- Full name: Sanzhar Zhumangeldiyevich Musayev
- Nationality: Kazakhstani
- Born: 11 April 1996 (age 30) Taldykorgan, Almaty Oblysy, Kazakhstan
Medal record
Men's recurve archery
Representing Kazakhstan
Archery World Cup
Gold medal – first place	2017 Shanghai	Team

Sanzhar Zhumangeldiyevich Musayev (Санжар Жумангельдиевич Мусаев, born 11 April 1996) is a Kazakhstani archer. He competed in the men's individual event at the 2020 Summer Olympics.
