= Yuki Kawata =

Japanese archer (born 1997)

Personal information
- Nationality: Japanese
- Born: 16 June 1997 (age 29)

Sport
- Country: Japan
- Sport: Archery
Medal record
Men's recurve archery
Representing Japan
Olympic Games
Bronze medal – third place	2020 Tokyo	Team
World Championships
Bronze medal – third place	2025 Gwangju	Team
Bronze medal – third place	2025 Gwangju	Mixed team
Asian Championships
Silver medal – second place	2015 Bangkok	Team
Silver medal – second place	2017 Dhaka	Individual
World University Games
Silver medal – second place	2021 Chengdu	Individual

Yuki Kawata (河田 悠希, Kawata Yūki; born 16 June 1997) is a Japanese archer. He competed in the men's individual event at the 2020 Summer Olympics. and won a bronze medal as a member of the Japanese Men's team.
