= Lee Woo-seok =

South Korean archer (born 1997)

Personal information
- Born: August 7, 1997 (age 29) Incheon, South Korea
Medal record
Men's recurve archery
Representing South Korea
Olympic Games
| Gold medal – first place | 2024 Paris | Team |
| Bronze medal – third place | 2024 Paris | Individual |
World Championships
| Gold medal – first place | 2019 's-Hertogenbosch | Mixed team |
| Gold medal – first place | 2023 Berlin | Team |
| Gold medal – first place | 2025 Gwangju | Team |
| Bronze medal – third place | 2019 's-Hertogenbosch | Team |
World Cup Final
| Silver medal – second place | 2018 Samsun | Individual |
| Silver medal – second place | 2023 Hermosillo | Individual |
| Silver medal – second place | 2024 Tlaxcala | Individual |
Asian Games
| Gold medal – first place | 2022 Hangzhou | Mixed team |
| Gold medal – first place | 2022 Hangzhou | Team |
| Gold medal – first place | 2026 Aichi–Nagoya | Individual |
| Gold medal – first place | 2026 Aichi–Nagoya | Team |
| Silver medal – second place | 2018 Jakarta | Individual |
| Silver medal – second place | 2018 Jakarta | Team |
| Bronze medal – third place | 2022 Hangzhou | Individual |
Asian Championships
| Gold medal – first place | 2015 Bangkok | Individual |
| Gold medal – first place | 2015 Bangkok | Team |
| Gold medal – first place | 2017 Dhaka | Team |
| Gold medal – first place | 2019 Bangkok | Individual |
| Gold medal – first place | 2019 Bangkok | Team |
| Gold medal – first place | 2023 Bangkok | Team |
| Gold medal – first place | 2023 Bangkok | Mixed team |
| Silver medal – second place | 2015 Bangkok | Mixed team |
| Bronze medal – third place | 2021 Dhaka | Individual |
| Bronze medal – third place | 2023 Bangkok | Individual |
Summer Universiade
| Gold medal – first place | 2017 Taipei | Team |
| Gold medal – first place | 2019 Naples | Individual |
Military World Games
| Silver medal – second place | 2019 Wuhan | Individual |
| Bronze medal – third place | 2019 Wuhan | Team |

- Lee Woo-seok
- Hangul: 이우석
- RR: I Useok
- MR: I Usŏk

Lee Woo-seok (Korean: 이우석; born August 7, 1997) is a South Korean archer who competes in men's recurve events. He competed in the 2024 Summer Olympics held in Paris, France and won the bronze medal in men's individual archery and the gold medal in the men's team archery event.

== Career ==
Lee competed in the 2019 World Archery Championships held in 's-Hertogenbosch, Netherlands where he won the bronze medal in the men's recurve team event and the gold medal in the mixed team event. He also competed in the 2023 World Archery Championships held in Berlin, Germany and where he won the gold medal in the men's recurve event.

Previously, he won the gold medal in the men's individual event at the 2014 Summer Youth Olympics held in Nanjing, China. At the time, he stated that his ambition was to become an Olympic champion.

== See also ==
- List of Youth Olympic Games gold medalists who won Olympic gold medals
