= Wei Shaoxuan =

Chinese archer (born 2000)

Personal information
- Born: 22 November 2000 (age 25) Changchun, Jilin, China

Sport
- Country: China
- Sport: Archery
- Event: Recurve
Medal record
Men's recurve archery
Representing China
World Championships
Gold medal – first place	2019 's-Hertogenbosch	Team

Wei Shaoxuan (Chinese: 魏绍轩, born 22 November 2000) is a Chinese archer. He competed in archery at the 2020 Summer Olympics.
