= Jarno De Smedt =

Belgian archer (born 2000)

Personal information
- Nationality: Belgian
- Born: 4 January 2000 (age 25) Bornem, Belgium

Sport
- Country: Belgium
- Sport: Archery

Jarno De Smedt (born 4 January 2000) is a Belgian archer. He competed in the men's individual event at the 2020 Summer Olympics.
