= Tang Chih-chun =

Taiwanese archer (born 2001)

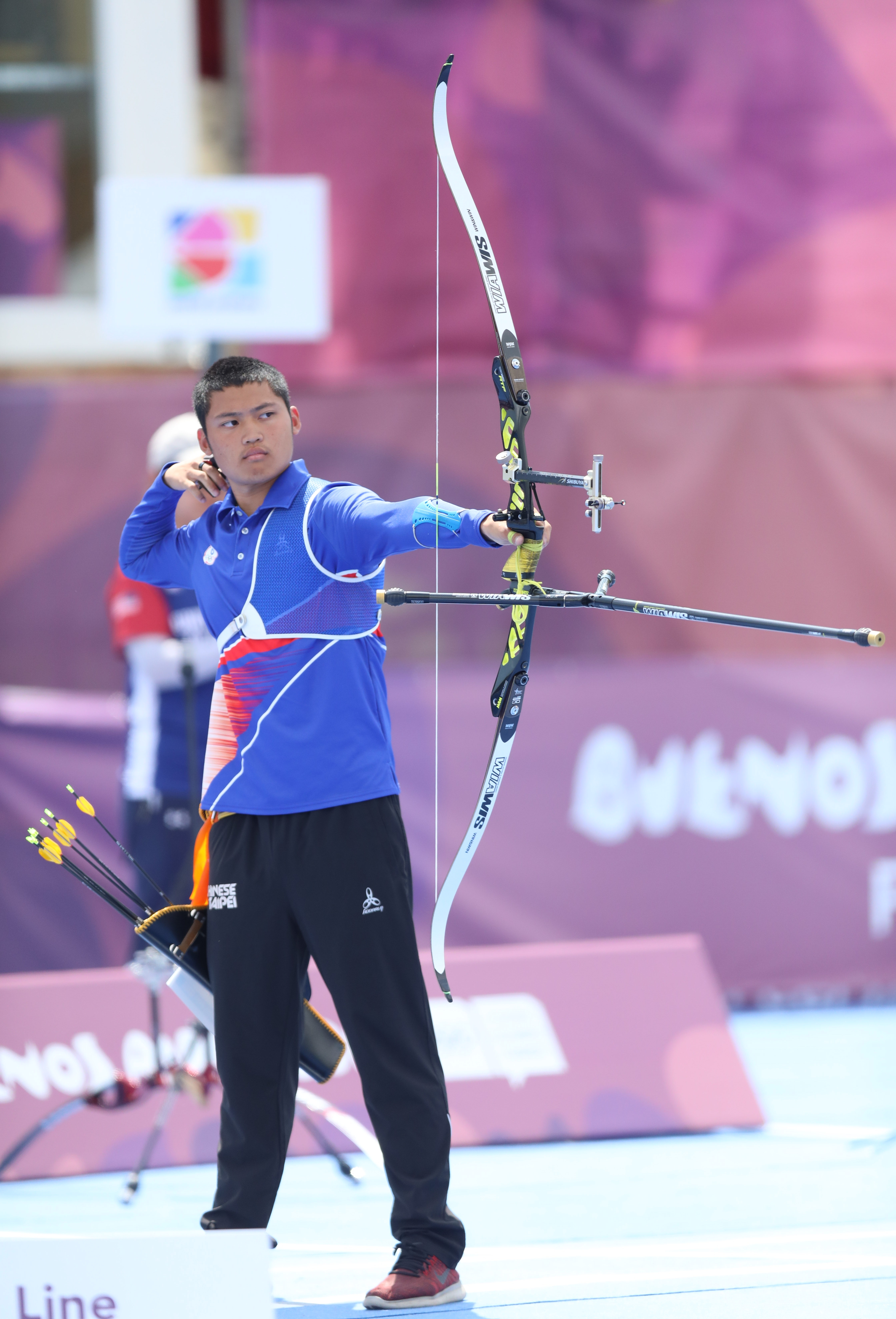
- Tang in 2018

Personal information
- Native name: 湯智鈞
- Born: 16 March 2001 (age 25)

Sport
- Country: Taiwan
- Sport: Archery
- Event: Recurve
- Coached by: Liu Chan-Ming
Medal record
Men's recurve archery
Representing Chinese Taipei
Olympic Games
Silver medal – second place	2020 Tokyo	Team
Asian Games
Gold medal – first place	2018 Jakarta	Team
Bronze medal – third place	2026 Aichi–Nagoya	Team
Asian Championships
Silver medal – second place	2023 Bangkok	Individual
Summer Universiade
Gold medal – first place	2025 Rhine-Ruhr	Individual
Silver medal – second place	2019 Naples	Team

Tang Chih-chun (Chinese: 湯智鈞; pinyin: Tāng Zhìjūn; born 16 March 2001) is a Taiwanese archer competing in men's recurve events. He won the gold medal in the men's team recurve event, alongside Luo Wei-min and Wei Chun-heng, at the 2018 Asian Games held in Jakarta, Indonesia.

== Career ==
In 2018, he competed at the Summer Youth Olympics held in Buenos Aires, Argentina without winning a medal. In the boys' singles he reached the elimination rounds where he was eliminated in his second elimination match, by Trenton Cowles of the United States. Cowles went on to win the gold medal. In the mixed team he reached the bronze medal match, alongside Rebecca Jones of New Zealand, and they lost their match against Quinn Reddig of Namibia and Trenton Cowles.

In 2019, Tang and Wei Chun-heng won the silver medal in the men's team event at the Summer Universiade held in Naples, Italy.

In 2021, he represented Chinese Taipei at the 2020 Summer Olympics in Tokyo, Japan, winning the silver medal in the men's team event, while barely missing a medal due to placing fourth in the men's individual event.

He competed at the 2022 Asian Games held in Hangzhou, China.

Tang competed for Chinese Taipei at the 2024 Summer Olympics, where he finished seventh in the men's individual event and tied for 17th place in the men's team event.
