= Ilfat Abdullin =

Kazakhstani archer (born 1998)

Personal information
- Native name: Ильфат Ринатович Абдуллин
- Full name: Ilfat Rinatovich Abdullin
- Nationality: Kazakhstani
- Born: 9 January 1998 (age 28) Karabulak, Kazakhstan

Sport
- Sport: Archery
Medal record
Men's recurve archery
Representing Kazakhstan
Asian Championships
Silver medal – second place	2023 Bangkok	Team

Ilfat Rinatovich Abdullin (Ильфат Ринатович Абдуллин, born 9 January 1998) is a Kazakhstani archer. He competed in the men's individual event at the 2020 Summer Olympics. Abdullin has Tatar roots.
