= Takaharu Furukawa =

Japanese archer (born 1984)

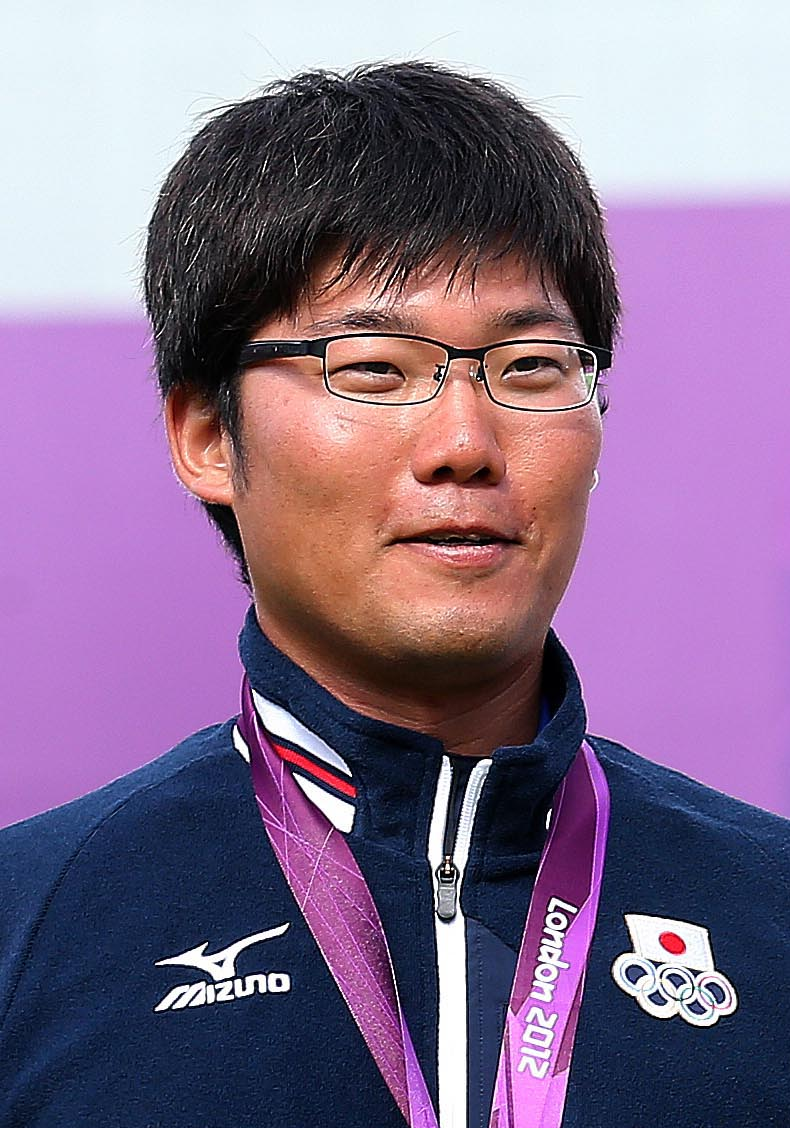
- Furukawa on the winner's podium at the 2012 Summer Olympics

Personal information
- Born: August 9, 1984 (age 42) Aomori, Japan
Medal record
Men's recurve archery
Representing Japan
Olympic Games
Silver medal – second place	2012 London	Individual
Bronze medal – third place	2020 Tokyo	Individual
Bronze medal – third place	2020 Tokyo	Team
World Championships
Bronze medal – third place	2015 Copenhagen	Individual
Bronze medal – third place	2023 Berlin	Team
World Cup Final
Silver medal – second place	2012 Tokyo	Mixed team
Asian Games
Gold medal – first place	2018 Jakarta	Mixed team
Silver medal – second place	2022 Hangzhou	Mixed team
Asian Championships
Gold medal – first place	2013 Taipei	Individual
Silver medal – second place	2013 Taipei	Team
Bronze medal – third place	2023 Bangkok	Mixed team

Takaharu Furukawa (古川 高晴, Furukawa Takaharu; born August 9, 1984 in Aomori) is an archery athlete from Japan, competing in both individual and team archery events. He competed in the 2004, 2008, 2012, and 2020 Summer Olympics. He was the 2006 All-Japan National Champion,

== Archery career ==
Furukawa began his archery career in 2001. He competed using a recursive bow.

=== 2004-2006 archery competitions ===
Furukawa competed at the 2004 Summer Olympics in men's individual archery and archery team events. In the individual competition, he won his first match, advancing to the round of 32. In the second round of elimination, he was defeated. His final rank was 22nd overall. Furukawa was also a member of the 8th-place Japanese men's archery team.

Furukawa was the 2006 All-Japan National Champion, having won the 2006 All-Japan Archery nationals at Yamaguchi in November 2006.

=== 2008 Summer Olympics ===
At the 2008 Summer Olympics in Beijing, Furukawa finished his ranking round with a total of 663 points, which gave him the 17th seed for the final competition bracket in which he faced Maksim Kunda in the first round. Despite Kunda only being the 48th seed he managed to equal Furukawa and both archers scored 111 points. In the extra round Furukawa scored 18 points, but Kunda advanced to the next round because he scored 19 points.

=== 2012 Summer Olympics (silver medal) ===
At the 2012 Summer Olympics in London, Furukawa finished his ranking round with a 679, good for the 5th seed in the competition bracket. He advanced to the gold medal round, where he faced South Korea's Oh Jin-Hyek. After Oh Jin-Hyek scored seven set points to Furukawa's one, Oh-Jin Hyek was awarded the gold medal and Furukawa was awarded the silver.

=== 2020 Summer Olympics (bronze medals) ===
Furukawa won bronze medals as a member of the Japanese Men's team and as an individual.
