= Dan Olaru =

Moldovan-Romanian archer (born 1996)

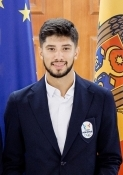
- Olaru in 2024

Personal information
- Born: 11 November 1996 (age 29) Chișinău, Moldova
- Height: 175 cm (5 ft 9 in)
- Weight: 70 kg (154 lb)

Sport
- Country: Moldova
- Sport: Archery
Medal record
Men's recurve archery
Representing Moldova
European Indoor Championships
Bronze medal – third place	2025 Samsun	Team

Dan Olaru (born 11 November 1996) is a Moldovan archer. At the 2012 Summer Olympics he competed for his country in the Men's individual event. He went on to represent his country again at the 2020 Summer Olympics, in the Men's individual event, and Mixed team event.

Olaru also competed for Moldova at the 2024 Summer Olympics, as well as the 2015, 2019, and 2023 European Games.
