= Kim Woo-jin (archer) =

South Korean archer (born 1992)

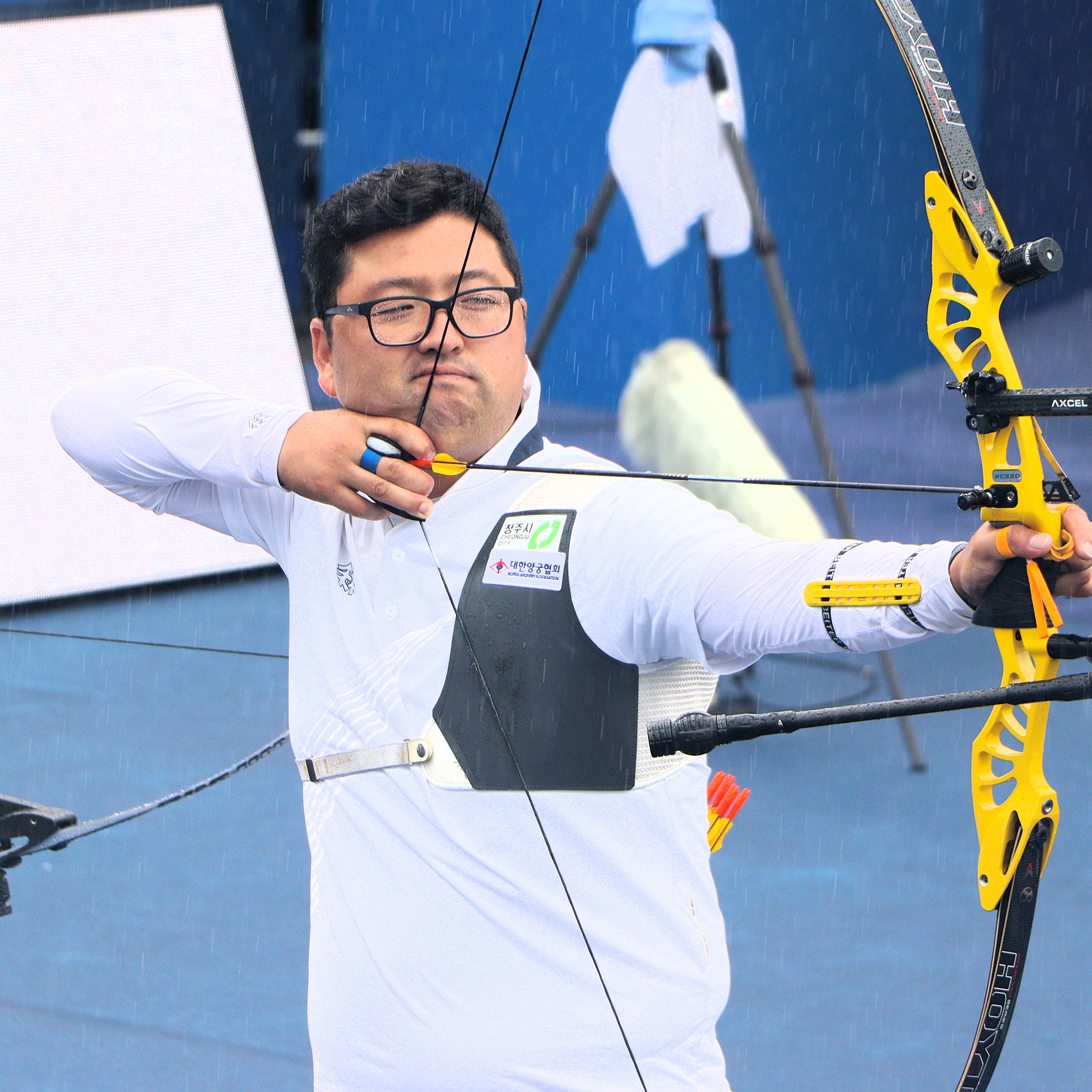
- Kim at the 2025 World Archery Championships

Personal information
- Native name: 김우진
- National team: South Korea
- Born: June 20, 1992 (age 34) Okcheon, North Chungcheong, South Korea
- Education: Juseong University, Chungbuk Physical Education High School, Iwon Middle School, Iwon Elementary School
- Height: 5 ft 11 in (180 cm)
- Weight: 198 lb (90 kg)

Sport
- Sport: Archery
- Club: Cheongju City
Medal record
Men's recurve archery
Representing South Korea
Olympic Games
Gold medal – first place	2016 Rio de Janeiro	Team
Gold medal – first place	2020 Tokyo	Team
Gold medal – first place	2024 Paris	Individual
Gold medal – first place	2024 Paris	Team
Gold medal – first place	2024 Paris	Mixed team
World Championships
Gold medal – first place	2011 Turin	Individual
Gold medal – first place	2011 Turin	Team
Gold medal – first place	2015 Copenhagen	Individual
Gold medal – first place	2015 Copenhagen	Team
Gold medal – first place	2021 Yankton	Individual
Gold medal – first place	2021 Yankton	Team
Gold medal – first place	2021 Yankton	Mixed team
Gold medal – first place	2023 Berlin	Team
Gold medal – first place	2023 Berlin	Mixed team
Gold medal – first place	2025 Gwangju	Team
Silver medal – second place	2025 Gwangju	Mixed team
Bronze medal – third place	2017 Mexico City	Team
Bronze medal – third place	2019 's-Hertogenbosch	Team
World Cup Final
Gold medal – first place	2012 Tokyo	Individual
Gold medal – first place	2015 Mexico City	Mixed team
Gold medal – first place	2017 Rome	Individual
Gold medal – first place	2017 Rome	Mixed team
Gold medal – first place	2018 Samsun	Individual
Gold medal – first place	2018 Samsun	Mixed team
Gold medal – first place	2019 Moscow	Mixed team
Gold medal – first place	2022 Tlaxcala	Individual
Gold medal – first place	2024 Tlaxcala	Individual
Bronze medal – third place	2015 Mexico City	Individual
Asian Games
Gold medal – first place	2010 Guangzhou	Individual
Gold medal – first place	2010 Guangzhou	Team
Gold medal – first place	2018 Jakarta	Individual
Gold medal – first place	2026 Aichi–Nagoya	Team
Silver medal – second place	2018 Jakarta	Team
Asian Championships
Gold medal – first place	2019 Bangkok	Team
Gold medal – first place	2019 Bangkok	Mixed team
Silver medal – second place	2019 Bangkok	Individual
Gold medal – first place	2023 Bangkok	Individual
Gold medal – first place	2023 Bangkok	Team
Summer Universiade
Gold medal – first place	2015 Gwangju	Team
Gold medal – first place	2017 Taipei	Team
Silver medal – second place	2011 Shenzhen	Individual
Bronze medal – third place	2015 Gwangju	Individual
Bronze medal – third place	2017 Taipei	Individual

Korean name
- Hangul: 김우진
- RR: Gim Ujin
- MR: Kim Ujin

Kim Woo-jin (Korean: 김우진; Korean pronunciation: [ki.mu.dʑin] or [kim] [u.dʑin]; born June 20, 1992) is a South Korean archer specializing in recurve archery. He first held the world number one ranking in 2011. At the 2016 Summer Olympics, he set a world record in men's individual recurve archery as well as won the gold medal as a member of the South Korean men's archery team. During the 2024 Summer Olympics, he earned an Olympic gold medal in the men's individual event after a tiebreaker with American archer Brady Ellison. This victory marked Kim's fifth gold medal overall and his third consecutive Olympics in which he won a gold medal. He is also a three-time world champion in the men's individual recurve event at the World Archery Championships.

His record of five Olympic gold medals is the most won by any archer in the world, surpassing the four won by Kim Soo-nyung. It also makes him the most awarded Korean Olympian of all time in any sport.

He is right-handed, and uses 30-inch (76 cm) arrows and a draw weight of 46 pounds (21 kg).

== Career ==
Kim was part of the 2011 World Archery Championships gold medal-winning men's team and won the individual gold medal at the 2011 World Archery Championships and the 2012 FITA Archery World Cup. Despite this, he was not selected for the 2012 Korean Olympic team.

In 2015, he was again selected for the Korean national team and became the first man since 1985 to win the World Archery Championships twice.

During the Rio 2016 Summer Olympics, Kim set a world record during the individual men's qualifying round with a score of 700 out of a possible 720 (held under World Archery Federation rules at a distance of 70 meters). The previous record of 699 was set by Im Dong-hyun (also of South Korea) at the 2012 Olympics, and the record would stand until surpassed by Brady Ellison with a score of 702 at the 2019 World Archery Championships. However, in a major upset, Kim lost 2–6 in the second round in the individual category to Indonesia's Riau Ega Agatha. He was one of the three members of the South Korean men's team who won the Olympic gold medal in the team competition.

At the Tokyo 2020 Summer Olympics, he earned a gold medal in the men's team event and finished fifth in the men's individual event.

During the Paris 2024 Summer Olympics, Kim earned an Olympic gold medal in the men's individual event after a tiebreaker with American archer Brady Ellison. This victory marked Kim's fifth gold medal overall and his third consecutive Olympics in which he won a gold medal. In addition, Kim secured a gold medal in the men's team archery event, making him one of only two athletes, along with Kim Soo-nyung, to achieve three consecutive team gold medals in archery at the Olympics. This made him South Korea's most successful Olympic athlete. His gold completed South Korea's clean sweep of archery at that Olympics.

== Personal life ==
As of August 2021, Kim was planning to marry his girlfriend in December 2021.

== See also ==
- List of South Korean archers
