= List of Indian archers =

- Governing body: Archery Association of India

This is a list of Indian archers.

== Indian female archers ==
- Muskan Kirar
- Raj Kaur
- Dola Banerjee
- Ankita Bhakat
- Rimil Buriuly
- Krishna Das (archer)
- Trisha Deb
- Divya Dhayal
- Nisha Rani Dutta
- Gagandeep Kaur
- Deepika Kumari
- Madhumita Kumari
- Reena Kumari
- Bombayla Devi Laishram
- Purnima Mahato
- Laxmirani Majhi
- Lily Chanu Paonam
- Jayalakshmi Sarikonda
- Sumangala Sharma
- Purvasha Shende
- Chekrovolu Swuro
- Pranitha Vardhineni
- Jyothi Surekha Vennam
- Parneet Kaur
- Chikitha Taniparthi
- Prithika Pradeep
- Kumkum Mohod

== Indian male archers ==
- Rahul Banerjee
- Mangal Singh Champia
- Rajat Chauhan
- Atanu Das
- Gora Ho
- Sandeep Kumar (archer)
- Cherukuri Lenin
- Shyam Lal Meena
- Sanand Mitra
- Satyadev Prasad
- Tarundeep Rai
- Limba Ram
- Majhi Sawaiyan
- Sanjeeva Kumar Singh
- Jayanta Talukdar
- Abhishek Verma (archer)
- Atul Verma
- Vishwas (archer)
- Rishabh Yadav
- Kushal Dalal
- Sahil Rajesh Jadhav
