= Archery in India =

- Country: India
- Governing body: Archery Association of India
- National team: See below

Club competitions
- Archery Premier League (2025–present)

International competitions
- Olympic Games; World Championships; World Cup; Paralympic Games; Asian Games; Commonwealth Games

The national Indian governing body of archery as a sport in India is the Archery Association of India.

Deepika Kumari is the first Indian archer to achieve World Number 1 rank in women's individual recurve. She achieved this feat on 14 June in 2012. She again achieved the feat by reaching #1 rank on 28 June 2021. She has won an individual gold medal in archery at the 2010 Commonwealth Games, beating Olympic bronze medalist Alison Williamson. She has also won 5 medals in World Cup Finals which include 4 individual silver medal. She has also won 2 silver medals in World Archery Championships as part of the women's recurve team.

Dola Banerjee became first Indian world champion in archery by winning the gold medal in the women's individual recurve competition at the Archery World Cup Final held at Dubai in November 2007. Dola Banerjee is the second woman archer to be honored with the Arjuna award by the Government of India in 2005. In Commonwealth Games 2010 in New Delhi, she won gold medal in women's team recurve with Deepika Kumari.

Rajat Chauhan is the first Indian archer to win a silver medal in men's individual compound event in World Archery Championships. He achieved this feat at 2015 World Archery Championships.

Jyothi Surekha is the first India female archer to win an individual medal in women's individual compound event in World Archery Championships. She won a bronze medal at 2019 World Archery Championships.

Rahul Banerjee won a gold medal at the 2010 Commonwealth Games in Delhi, in the individual recurve event and a team bronze medal. Banerjee received the Arjuna Award in 2011.

Another notable Indian archer is three-time Olympian Limba Ram. Ram set a world record in 1992 at the Asian Archery Championships held that year in Beijing.

== Medal table ==
Competition	Gold	Silver	Bronze	Total
Paralympic Games	1	0	2	3
World Championships	4	10	3	17
World Cup Finals	2	8	4	14
World Cup	48	43	51	142
Asian Games	6	6	7	19
Commonwealth Games	3	1	4	8
Total	64	68	71	203

- Updated till 13th September, 2026

== Recurve rankings ==
=== Men's individual ===
Change	Ranking	Archer	Points
Steady	8	Dhiraj Bommadevara	225.5
▲+1	29	Atanu Das	119
▲+2	47	Rahul Pawariya	94
Steady	58	Parth Salunkhe	86
▼-2	71	Neeraj Chauhan	73
▼-5	112	Devaang Gupta	50.5
▼-4	122	Adroit Sachin Gupta	46
▼-3	132	Tarundeep Rai	42
▼-2	157	Yashdeep Bhoge	36
▼-10	162	Vishnu Choudhary	35
Last updated: 29 July 2026 | Source: World Archery

=== Women's individual ===
Change	Ranking	Archer	Points
▲+1	16	Deepika Kumari	173.5
Steady	21	Ankita Bhakat	164.5
Steady	24	Simranjeet Kaur	144
▲+1	52	Kumkum Mohod	88
▲+1	58	Kirti Sharma	82
▼-3	96	Gatha Khadake	56
▲+2	112	Anshika Kumari	47
Steady	126	Sangeeta	42
▼-21	130	Basanti Mahato	41.375
▼-3	158	Ridhi	34
Last updated: 29 July 2026 | Source: World Archery

=== Men's team ===
Change	Ranking	Team	Points
Steady	7	India	183
Last updated: 29 July 2026 | Source: World Archery

=== Women's team ===
Change	Ranking	Team	Points
Steady	6	India	216
Last updated: 14 September 2025 | Source: World Archery

=== Mixed team ===
Change	Ranking	Team	Points
Steady	7	India	199
Last updated: 29 July 2026 | Source: World Archery

== Compound rankings ==
=== Men's individual ===
Change	Ranking	Archer	Points
Steady	6	Rishabh Yadav	211
Steady	7	Abhishek Verma	202.5
Steady	16	Prathamesh Fuge	159
Steady	18	Priyansh Kumar	144
Steady	22	Kushal Dalal	133
Steady	41	Ojas Deotale	80
Steady	57	Prathamesh Jawkar	66
▲+1	67	Sahil Jadhav	60
Steady	80	Ganesh Thirumuru	50
Steady	89	Uday Kamboj	45
Last updated: 14 September 2025 | Source: World Archery

=== Women's individual ===
Change	Ranking	Archer	Points
Steady	4	Jyothi Surekha	281
▼-3	15	Parneet Kaur	144
▼-1	22	Aditi Swami	110
Steady	29	Avneet Kaur	88
▼-2	80	Chikitha Taniparthi	41.5
▼-1	88	Kumud Saini	40
▼-12	139	Muskan Kirar	24.75
Steady	142	Tejal Salve	24
▼-3	150	Pragati Choudhary	23
▼-2	154	Sakshi Chaudhary	22.5
Last updated: 17 April 2025 | Source: World Archery

=== Men's team ===
Change	Ranking	Team	Points
Steady	3	India	227
Last updated: 14 September 2025 | Source: World Archery

=== Women's team ===
Change	Ranking	Team	Points
Steady	2	India	256
Last updated: 14 September 2025 | Source: World Archery

=== Mixed team ===
Change	Ranking	Team	Points
Steady	1	India	252
Last updated: 14 September 2025 | Source: World Archery

== Para rankings ==
=== Recurve ===
==== Men's individual open ====
Change	Ranking	Archer	Points
Steady	1	Harvinder Singh	177
Steady	28	Vivek Chikara	58.75
Steady	31	Sahil	53
Steady	56	Dhanna Ram Godara	26
Steady	81	Parveen	12
Last updated: 17 April 2025 | Source: World Archery

==== Women's individual ====
Change	Ranking	Archer	Points
Steady	4	Pooja Jatyan	130.5
Steady	24	Pooja Khanna	61.5
Steady	41	Bhawna	30.5
Last updated: 17 April 2025 | Source: World Archery

==== Mixed Team ====
Change	Ranking	Team	Points
Steady	2	India	154.25
Last updated: 17 April 2025 | Source: World Archery

=== Compound ===
==== Men's individual ====
Change	Ranking	Archer	Points
Steady	2	Rakesh Kumar	148
Steady	13	Shyam Sunder Swami	89
Steady	38	Suraj Singh	50.75
Steady	75	Mohd Shavej	20
Last updated: 17 April 2025 | Source: World Archery

==== Women's individual ====
Change	Ranking	Archer	Points
Steady	4	Jyothi Surekha	281
▼-3	15	Parneet Kaur	144
▼-1	22	Aditi Swami	110
Steady	29	Avneet Kaur	88
▼-2	80	Chikitha Taniparthi	41.5
▼-1	88	Kumud Saini	40
▼-12	139	Muskan Kirar	24.75
Steady	142	Tejal Salve	24
▼-3	150	Pragati	23
▼-2	154	Sakshi Chaudhary	22.5
Last updated: 17 April 2025 | Source: World Archery

==== Men's Team ====
Change	Ranking	Team	Points
Steady	2	India	232
Last updated: 17 April 2025 | Source: World Archery

==== Women's Team ====
Change	Ranking	Team	Points
Steady	1	India	280
Last updated: 17 April 2025 | Source: World Archery

==== Mixed Team ====
Change	Ranking	Team	Points
▲+1	1	India	268
Last updated: 17 April 2025 | Source: World Archery

== Notable performance at Olympics ==
Year	Event	Player	Result	Rank
2004
2004	Women's team	Dola Banerjee; Reena Kumari; Sumangala Sharma	Quarter-finals	5
2008
2008	Women's team	Dola Banerjee; Bombayala Devi; Pranitha Vardhineni	Quarter-finals	6
2016
2016	Women's team	Deepika Kumari; Bombayla Devi; Laxmirani Majhi	Quarter-finals	7
2020
2020	Mixed team	Deepika Kumari; Pravin Jadhav	Quarter-finals	6
2020	Men's team	Atanu Das; Pravin Jadhav; Tarundeep Rai	Quarter-finals	8
2020	Women's individual	Deepika Kumari	Quarter-finals	8
2024
2024	Mixed team	Dhiraj Bommadevara; Ankita Bhakat	Semi-finals	4
2024	Men's team	Dhiraj Bommadevara; Tarundeep Rai; Pravin Jadhav	Quarter-finals	5
2024	Women's team	Bhajan Kaur; Deepika Kumari; Ankita Bhakat	Quarter-finals	5
2024	Women's individual	Deepika Kumari	Quarter-finals	8

=== List of National Sports award recipients in Archery, showing the year, award, and gender ===
Year	Recipient	Award	Gender
1981	Krishna Das	Arjuna Award	Female
1989	Shyam Lal Meena	Arjuna Award	Male
1991	Limba Ram	Arjuna Award	Male
1992	Sanjeeva Kumar Singh	Arjuna Award	Male
2005	Dola Banerjee	Arjuna Award	Female
2005	Tarundeep Rai	Arjuna Award	Male
2006	Jayanta Talukdar	Arjuna Award	Male
2009	Mangal Singh Champia	Arjuna Award	Male
2011	Rahul Banerjee	Arjuna Award	Male
2012	Bombayla Devi Laishram	Arjuna Award	Female
2012	Deepika Kumari	Arjuna Award	Female
2013	Chekrovolu Swuro	Arjuna Award	Female
2014	Abhishek Verma	Arjuna Award	Male
2015	Sandeep Kumar	Arjuna Award	Male
2016	Rajat Chauhan	Arjuna Award	Male
2017	Jyothi Surekha Vennam	Arjuna Award	Female
2020	Atanu Das	Arjuna Award	Male
2018	Satyadev Prasad	Dhyan Chand Award	Male
2019	C. Lalremsanga	Dhyan Chand Award	Male
2007	Sanjeeva Kumar Singh	Dronacharya Award	Male
2013	Purnima Mahato	Dronacharya Award	Female
2020	Dharmendra Tiwary ^{+}	Dronacharya Award	Male
2022	Jiwanjot Singh Teja	Dronacharya Award	Male

Key
+ Indicates a Lifetime contribution honour

== See also ==
- Archery Association of India
- Indian Archers
