= 2025 Archery Premier League =

2025 season of Archery Premier League

Tournament information
- Date: 2 – 12 October 2025
- Administrator: Archery Association of India
- Tournament format(s): Double round-robin Knock-out
- Host: India
- Venue: Yamuna Sports Complex
- Teams: 6

Final positions
- Champions: Rajputana Royals
- Runner-up: Prithviraaj Yodhas

Tournament statistics
- Matches played: 64

The 2025 Archery Premier League was the inaugural season of the Archery Premier League. It was held from 2 to 12 October 2025 with 6 teams. Ram Charan was the official brand ambassador of the league. Rajputana Royals won the first edition.

== Format and venue ==
=== Format ===
The league featured 36 Indian archers and 12 foreign archers divided into six teams. Prithviraaj Yodhas, Kakatiya Knights, Mighty Marathas, Rajputana Royals, Chero Archers and Chola Chiefs were the six franchises. A draft system was followed instead of an auction for the league's first edition.

Each franchise comprised eight members, four men and four women. Each team had up to two foreign archers, with at least one of them required to be part of the playing four.

The league saw mixed team duels in recurve and compound. Round robin fixtures saw 3 matches per day, each lasting 20 minutes. The arrow shooting time was reduced to 15 seconds from the regular 20 seconds.

=== Venue ===
The matches were held at the Yamuna Sports Complex, New Delhi from 2 to 12 October 2025.

New Delhi
Yamuna Sports Complex
Capacity: 1,500

== Teams ==
Team	State	Coach	Ref
Chero Archers	Jharkhand	Purnima Mahato	
Chola Chiefs	Tamil Nadu	Sonam Tshering Bhutia	
Kakatiya Knights	Telangana	Rahul Banerjee	
Mighty Marathas	Maharashtra	Pravin Sawant	
Prithviraaj Yodhas	Delhi	Lokesh Chand	
Rajputana Royals	Rajasthan	Jiwanjot Singh Teja	

== Squads ==
Chero Archers	Chola Chiefs	Kakatiya Knights
(Denmark) Mathias Fullerton; (Germany) Katharina Bauer; (India) Rahul Pawariya; (India) Prithika Pradeep; (India) Atanu Das; (India) Madala Hamsini; (India) Sahil Jadhav; (India) Kumkum Mohod	(United States) Brady Ellison; (Estonia) Meeri-Marita Paas; (India) Rishabh Yadav; (India) Deepika Kumari; (India) Tarundeep Rai; (India) Chikitha Taniparthi; (India) Pulkit Kajla; (India) Anshika Kumari	(Austria) Nico Wiener; (Spain) Elia Canales; (India) Neeraj Chauhan; (India) Jyothi Surekha; (India) Rohit Kumar; (India) Avneet Kaur; (India) Jignas Chittibomma; (India) Tisha Punia
Mighty Marathas	Prithviraaj Yodhas	Rajputana Royals
(Netherlands) Mike Schloesser; (Mexico) Alejandra Valencia; (India) Dhiraj Bommadevara; (India) Parneet Kaur; (India) Aman Saini; (India) Bhajan Kaur; (India) Mrinal Chauhan; (India) Madhura Dhamangaonkar	(Mexico) Matias Grande; (Mexico) Andrea Becerra; (India) Abhishek Verma; (India) Gatha Khadake; (India) Priyansh Kumar; (India) Sharvari Shende; (India) Krish Kumar; (India) Pranjal Salve	(Turkey) Mete Gazoz; (United Kingdom) Ella Gibson; (India) Prathamesh Fuge; (India) Ankita Bhakat; (India) Ojas Deotale; (India) Basanti Mahato; (India) Sachin Gupta; (India) Swati Dudhwal

== Points table ==
Pos	Team	Pld	W	L	Pts	Qualification
1	Rajputana Royals (C)	10	8	2	16	Advance to playoffs
2	Mighty Marathas	10	7	3	14	Advance to playoffs
3	Prithviraaj Yodhas	10	5	5	10	Advance to playoffs
4	Chero Archers	10	4	6	8	Advance to playoffs
5	Chola Chiefs	10	4	6	8	
6	Kakatiya Knights	10	2	8	4	

First match(es) will be played: 2 October 2025. Source: World Archery
(C) Champion

== Playoffs ==
Semi-finals
12 October – Yamuna Sports Complex
Chero Archers	1
Rajputana Royals	5
12 October – Yamuna Sports Complex
Prithviraaj Yodhas	5
Mighty Marathas	3

Final
12 October – Yamuna Sports Complex
Rajputana Royals	4 (2)
Prithviraaj Yodhas	4 (0)

== Broadcasting ==
India

- SonyLIV

Worldwide

- Archery+
