= Archery at the 2026 Asian Games =

- Venue: Okazaki Central Park Multipurpose Square
- Location: Okazaki, Aichi Prefecture, Japan
- Dates: 26 September – 3 October 2026
- Competitors: 216 from 30 nations

Archery at the 2026 Asian Games was held between 26 September and 3 October 2026 at Okazaki Central Park Multipurpose Square. This will be the sport's twelfth consecutive appearance at the Games, since the 1978 edition.

== Schedule ==
R	Ranking round	E	Elimination rounds	F	Finals

Date Event	26 Sat	27; Sun	28; Mon	29; Tue	30; Wed		1 Thu		2 Fri		3 Sat	
Men's individual recurve	R			E							E	F
Women's individual recurve	R			E							E	F
Men's team recurve	R	E							E	F		
Women's team recurve	R	E							E	F		
Mixed team recurve	R	E							E	F		
Men's individual compound	R		E				E	F				
Women's individual compound	R		E				E	F				
Men's team compound	R	E			E	F						
Women's team compound	R	E			E	F						
Mixed team compound	R	E			E	F						

== Medal summary ==
=== Medal table ===
* Host nation (Japan)

Rank	Nation	Gold	Silver	Bronze	Total
1	India	5	2	2	9
2	South Korea	3	3	3	9
3	China	1	2	3	6
4	Indonesia	1	0	0	1
5	Chinese Taipei	0	1	2	3
6	Japan*	0	1	0	1
6	Philippines	0	1	0	1
Totals (7 entries)		10	10	10	30

=== Medalists ===
Recurve

Event	Gold	Silver	Bronze
Men's individual	Lee Woo-seok; South Korea	Junya Nakanishi; Japan	Neeraj Chauhan; India
Women's individual	Kumkum Mohod; India	Oh Ye-jin; South Korea	Huang Yuwei; China
Men's team	South Korea; Kim Woo-jin; Kim Je-deok; Lee Woo-seok	India; Dhiraj Bommadevara; Neeraj Chauhan; Yashdeep Bhoge	Chinese Taipei; Tang Chih-chun; Lin Zih-siang; Cheng Hsiang-hui
Women's team	India; Ankita Bhakat; Kirti Sharma; Kumkum Mohod	South Korea; Kang Chae-young; Lee Yun-ji; Oh Ye-jin	China; Zhu Jingyi; Huang Yuwei; Yu Qi
Mixed team	China; Zhu Jingyi; Li Mengqi	India; Kumkum Mohod; Dhiraj Bommadevara	South Korea; Kang Chae-young; Kim Je-deok

Compound

Event	Gold	Silver	Bronze
Men's individual	Kim Jong-ho; South Korea	Chang Cheng-Wei; Chinese Taipei	Mani Ratnam; India
Women's individual	Nurisa Dian Ashrifah; Indonesia	Amaya Cojuangco; Philippines	Kang Yeon-seo; South Korea
Men's team	India; Sahil Jadhav; Kushal Dalal; Mani Ratnam	China; Liao Jiahao; Liu Jinyi; Shi Jingyu	Chinese Taipei; Chang Cheng-wei; Chen Chieh-lun; Yen Tzu-hsiang
Women's team	India; Chikitha Taniparthi; Jyothi Surekha; Prithika Pradeep	China; Wang Yue; Wei Fangyao; Wunier	South Korea; Kang Yeon-seo; Park Jung-yoon; Park Ye-rin
Mixed team	India; Chikitha Taniparthi; Sahil Jadhav	South Korea; Park Jung-yoon; Choi Yong-hee	China; Wei Fangyao; Liu Jinyi

== Participating nations ==
- Afghanistan (1)
- Bangladesh (12)
- Bhutan (7)
- China (12)
- Chinese Taipei (12)
- Hong Kong (4)
- India (12)
- Indonesia (10)
- Iran (10)
- Japan (8) (host)
- Kazakhstan (12)
- Kyrgyzstan (6)
- Lebanon (4)
- Malaysia (12)
- Mongolia (12)
- Nepal (2)
- Palestine (1)
- Philippines (12)
- Qatar (5)
- Singapore (2)
- South Korea (12)
- Sri Lanka (2)
- Syria (3)
- Tajikistan (3)
- Thailand (8)
- Timor-Leste (2)
- United Arab Emirates (10)
- Uzbekistan (6)
- Vietnam (12)
- Yemen (2)
