= 2025 World Archery Youth Championships =

Archery championship edition

- Location: Winnipeg, Canada
- Start date: 20 August 2025
- End date: 24 August 2025

The 2025 World Archery Youth Championships was the 18th edition of the World Archery Youth Championships, organised by World Archery. The event was held in Winnipeg, Canada, between 20 and 24 August 2025. The junior events are held for those under 21, and the cadet events for those under 18.

== Schedule ==
As per the initial schedule, the tournament was to be held from 17 August. However, due to the ongoing industrial action by employees of the Air Canada, the tournament started on 20 August, with the conclusion date remaining unchanged.

== Medal table ==
* Host nation (Canada)

Rank	Nation	Gold	Silver	Bronze	Total
1	South Korea	7	6	4	17
2	India	4	2	2	8
3	United States	4	2	0	6
4	Germany	2	1	0	3
5	Mexico	1	2	3	6
6	Great Britain	1	1	0	2
7	Turkey	1	0	1	2
8	Chinese Taipei	0	5	4	9
9	New Zealand	0	1	0	1
10	Australia	0	0	2	2
11	Italy	0	0	1	1
11	Netherlands	0	0	1	1
11	Spain	0	0	1	1
11	Ukraine	0	0	1	1
Totals (14 entries)		20	20	20	60

== Summary ==
=== Junior events - Compound (Under-21) ===
Event	Gold	Silver	Bronze
Men's individual	(Germany) Ruven Flüß	(Mexico) Lot Máximo Méndez Ortiz	(Chinese Taipei) Wu Z Wei
Women's individual	(India) Chikitha Taniparthi	(South Korea) Park Ye-rin	(South Korea) Park Ri-ye
Men's team	India; Kushal Dalal; Apar Mihir Nitin; Ganesh Mani Ratnam Thirumuru	Germany; Fabio Alex; Noah Nuber; Ruven Flüß	Spain; Alvaro Pardo Gutierrez; Álvaro De los Santos Sánchez; Hector Gonzalez Manuel
Women's team	Turkey; Begüm Yuva; Defne Çakmak; Betül Özbek	South Korea; Park Ye-rin; Park Ri-ye; Hu Hee-yeon	Mexico; Adriana Castillo; Ximena Estrada; Regina Bernal
Mixed Team	Mexico; Adriana Castillo; José Ángel Cuéllar Iturbide	South Korea; Park Ye-rin; Kim Kang-min	Italy; Caterina Gallo; Lorenzo Gubbini

==== Men's individual - Finals ====
Quarterfinals
16	(Germany) Noah Nuber	139
8	(Israel) Shamai Yamrom	142
21	(Mexico) Lot Máximo Méndez Ortiz	144
20	(Chile) Agustín Infante Pérez	139
30	(Germany) Ruven Flüß	142^{10}
22	(United Kingdom) Luke Davis	142^{9}
7	(Italy) Lorenzo Gubbini	142
15	(Chinese Taipei) Wu Z-wei	143

Semifinals
8	(Israel) Shamai Yamrom	141
21	(Mexico) Lot Máximo Méndez Ortiz	143
30	(Germany) Ruven Flüß	145^{10+}
15	(Chinese Taipei) Wu Z-wei	145^{10}

Finals
23	(Mexico) Lot Máximo Méndez Ortiz	140
30	(Germany) Ruven Flüß	146
Third place
8	(Israel) Shamai Yamrom	145
15	(Chinese Taipei) Wu Z-wei	146

==== Women's individual - Finals ====
Quarterfinals
1	(India) Parneet Kaur	143
8	(India) Chikitha Taniparthi	146
5	(Spain) Paula Diaz Morillas	147
4	(Mexico) Adriana Castillo	145
3	(South Korea) Park Ri-ye	145
6	(India) Tejal Rajendra Salve	141
23	(United Kingdom) Patience Wood	142
2	(South Korea) Park Ye-rin	143

Semifinals
8	(India) Chikitha Taniparthi	142
5	(Spain) Paula Diaz Morillas	133
3	(South Korea) Park Ri-ye	140
2	(South Korea) Park Ye-rin	146

Finals
8	(India) Chikitha Taniparthi	142
2	(South Korea) Park Ye-rin	136
Third place
5	(Spain) Paula Diaz Morillas	141
3	(South Korea) Park Ri-ye	142

==== Men's Team - Finals ====
Quarterfinals
1	India	235
8	Israel	233
5	Mexico	229
4	South Korea	231
3	United States	227
6	Germany	231
7	Italy	229
2	Spain	230

Semifinals
1	India	233
4	South Korea	228
6	Germany	232
2	Spain	229

Finals
1	India	233^{29+}
6	Germany	233^{29}
Third place
4	South Korea	222
2	Spain	226

==== Women's Team - Finals ====
Quarterfinals
1	India	229
8	Turkey	232
5	United States	229
4	Spain	230
3	Mexico	229
6	Chinese Taipei	221
7	Guatemala	219
2	South Korea	230

Semifinals
8	Turkey	229
4	Spain	226
6	Mexico	230
2	South Korea	236

Finals
8	Turkey	227^{29}
2	South Korea	227^{27}
Third place
4	Spain	220
6	Mexico	223

==== Mixed Team - Finals ====
Quarterfinals
1	India	152
9	Italy	153
5	Turkey	145
4	Mexico	147
3	Spain	148
6	United States	151
7	Great Britain	148
2	South Korea	150

Semifinals
9	Italy	150
4	Mexico	153
6	United States	138
2	South Korea	154

Finals
4	Mexico	145^{20+}
2	South Korea	145^{20}
Third place
9	Italy	146
6	United States	143

=== Junior events - Recurve (Under-21) ===
Event	Gold	Silver	Bronze
Men's individual	Jang Joon-ha; South Korea	Huang Li-cheng; Chinese Taipei	Jai Crawley; Australia
Women's individual	Shin Seo-bhin; South Korea	Ángela Ruiz; Mexico	Han Sol; South Korea
Men's team	United States; Joshua Baek; Jack Krengel; Christian Stoddard	South Korea; Jang Joon-ha; Kim Dong-hoon; Min Seong-wook	Australia; Jai Crawley; Christopher Jackson; Marcus Yiu
Women's team	South Korea; Han Sol; Kim Mi-kang; Shin Seo-bhin	Chinese Taipei; Fong You-jhu; Hsu Hsin-tzu; Li Tsai-chi	Ukraine; Olha Chebotarenko; Dzvenyslava Chernyk; Daria Koval
Mixed Team	South Korea; Kim Mi-kang; Min Seong-wook	United Kingdom; Penny Healey; Archie Bromley	Chinese Taipei; Hsu Hsin-tzu; Huang Li-cheng

==== Men's individual - Finals ====
Quarterfinals
33	(Australia) Jai Crawley	6^{10}	27	28	27	27	26
8	(United States) Christian Stoddard	5^{8}	27	28	27	22	29
21	(Georgia (country)) Aleksandre Machavariani	2	29	24	23	26
4	(South Korea) Jang Joon-ha	6	28	29	28	27
14	(Chinese Taipei) Huang Li-cheng	6	27	26	30	27
22	(United Kingdom) Archie Bromley	2	25	29	20	26
10	(Germany) Knut-Mathes Jakubczik	2	27	25	22	28
18	(United States) Joshua Baek	6	26	26	27	29

Semifinals
33	(Australia) Jai Crawley	4	27	23	23	27	23
4	(South Korea) Jang Joon-ha	6	26	24	27	26	28
14	(Chinese Taipei) Huang Li-cheng	7	24	26	26	28	28
18	(United States) Joshua Baek	3	24	28	25	26	26

Finals
4	(South Korea) Jang Joon-ha	6	27	29	30
14	(Chinese Taipei) Huang Li-cheng	0	24	26	26
Third place
33	(Australia) Jai Crawley	6	28	25	29	29	28
18	(United States) Joshua Baek	4	27	28	27	29	28

==== Women's individual - Finals ====
Quarterfinals
1	(Mexico) Ángela Ruiz	6	27	29	28	27
25	(Netherlands) Quinty Roeffen	2	28	26	26	26
12	(Ukraine) Daria Koval	1	21	23	27	23
4	(France) Amélie Cordeau	7	25	26	27	25
3	(South Korea) Han Sol	6	28	27	27	27
14	(United States) Gabrielle Sasai	2	25	29	26	25
7	(South Korea) Shin Seo-bhin	7	27	23	25	27	26
2	(South Korea) Kim Mi-kang	3	27	27	24	26	25

Semifinals
1	(Mexico) Ángela Ruiz	6	26	25	27
4	(France) Amélie Cordeau	0	23	24	23
3	(South Korea) Han Sol	3	27	25	24	26	25
7	(South Korea) Shin Seo-bhin	7	28	24	24	28	28

Finals
1	(Mexico) Ángela Ruiz	5^{9}	28	27	27	23	25
7	(South Korea) Shin Seo-bhin	6^{10}	24	24	27	27	30
Third place
4	(France) Amélie Cordeau	2	27	22	24	25
3	(South Korea) Han Sol	6	25	26	27	29

==== Men's Team - Finals ====
Quarterfinals
1	South Korea	5	57	54	56
9	France	1	54	54	53
12	Mexico	3	48	48	55	50
4	Bangladesh	5	54	51	47	50
3	India	2	49	51	56	51
11	Australia	6	55	55	55	53
7	Italy	1	49	54	55
2	United States	5	56	54	58

Semifinals
1	South Korea	5	55	56	59
4	Bangladesh	1	53	56	54
11	Australia	4^{28}	54	52	55	55
2	United States	5^{29}	56	54	52	54

Finals
1	South Korea	1	51	53	42
2	United States	5	51	54	50
Third place
4	Bangladesh	1	53	52	51
11	Australia	5	53	55	55

==== Women's Team - Finals ====
Quarterfinals
1	South Korea	5^{27}	52	56	51	55
8	India	4^{23}	55	52	53	50
5	Japan	4^{25}	55	47	51	54
4	France	5^{25+}	56	57	50	52
3	Ukraine	5	50	51	56	54
6	Germany	3	50	54	50	52
7	United States	2	48	54	52	52
2	Chinese Taipei	6	52	50	54	55

Semifinals
1	South Korea	6	58	58	57
4	France	0	54	51	55
3	Ukraine	4^{26}	54	55	55	52
2	Chinese Taipei	5^{29}	55	53	52	56

Finals
1	South Korea	6	51	57	57
2	Chinese Taipei	0	44	44	54
Third place
4	France	0	50	47	49
3	Ukraine	6	53	51	52

==== Mixed Team - Finals ====
Quarterfinals
1	South Korea	5^{19}	39	37	37	35
8	India	4^{18}	38	34	40	36
12	Kazakhstan	2	34	35	35	36
4	Chinese Taipei	6	39	36	34	38
3	Mexico	5	34	36	35	37
11	Japan	3	56	36	32	34
7	Great Britain	6	37	31	36	36
18	Australia	2	36	37	34	34

Semifinals
1	South Korea	6	39	37	36
4	Chinese Taipei	0	36	36	33
3	Mexico	4^{16}	32	36	37	35
7	Great Britain	5^{19}	35	37	36	32

Finals
1	South Korea	5	32	35	35	35
7	Great Britain	3	32	34	36	32
Third place
4	Chinese Taipei	6	38	30	34	32
3	Mexico	2	32	35	31	31

=== Junior events - Compound (Under-18) ===
Event	Gold	Silver	Bronze
Men's individual	(Germany) Moritz Simon	(New Zealand) Hector McNeilly	(Chinese Taipei) Yen Tzu Hsiang
Women's individual	(United States) Savannah O'Donohue	(India) Prithika Pradeep	(Netherlands) Fenna Stallen
Men's team	India; Mohit Dagar; Devansh Singh; Yogesh Joshi	United States; Caleb Quiocho; Suraj Nalam; Brody Wonch	Chinese Taipei; Yen Tzu-hsiang; Hsu Chin-wei; Huang Shao-gu
Women's team	United States; Julia Cook; Khloe Markle; Savannah O'Donohue	Chinese Taipei; Chen Fang-yi; Chen Kuan-han; Lin Jia-ling	Mexico; Zully Ann Leon Cano; Lia Carolina Lugo Romero; Melissa Robles Retano
Mixed Team	United States; Savannah O'Donohue; Caleb Quiocho	India; Prithika Pradeep; Mohit Dagar	Mexico; Melissa Robles Retano; Ian Patricio Vite Flores

==== Men's individual - Finals ====
Quarterfinals
1	(New Zealand) Hector McNeilly	142
9	(Canada) Harkunwar Singh Teja	140
12	(India) Yogesh Joshi	148
4	(United States) Caleb Quiocho	143
3	(Spain) Raphael Amar Matejka	144^{9}
6	(Chinese Taipei) Yen Tzu Hsiang	144^{10}
7	(Germany) Moritz Simon	146
2	(India) Mohit Dagar	145

Semifinals
1	(New Zealand) Hector McNeilly	136
12	(India) Yogesh Joshi	132
6	(Chinese Taipei) Yen Tzu Hsiang	130
7	(Germany) Moritz Simon	140

Finals
1	(New Zealand) Hector McNeilly	130
7	(Germany) Moritz Simon	139
Third place
12	(India) Yogesh Joshi	139
6	(Chinese Taipei) Yen Tzu Hsiang	143

==== Women's individual - Finals ====
Quarterfinals
1	(United States) Savannah O'Donohue	141
8	(Mexico) Robles Retano Melissa	137
12	(United States) Khloe Markle	139^{8}
4	(Netherlands) Fenna Stallen	139^{10}
3	(India) Prithika Pradeep	140
6	(United States) Julia Cook	125
10	(India) Surya Hamsini Madala	137
18	(Italy) Candido Ilaria	127

Semifinals
1	(United States) Savannah O'Donohue	145
4	(Netherlands) Fenna Stallen	136
3	(India) Prithika Pradeep	130
10	(India) Surya Hamsini Madala	128

Finals
1	(United States) Savannah O'Donohue	143
3	(India) Prithika Pradeep	140
Third place
4	(Netherlands) Fenna Stallen	139
10	(India) Surya Hamsini Madala	127

==== Men's team - Finals ====
Quarterfinals
1	India
Bye
5	Mexico	221
4	Canada	DSQ
3	Chinese Taipei	219^{28}
6	Italy	219^{21}
7	Hong Kong	214
2	United States	230

Semifinals
1	India
Bye
6	Chinese Taipei	221
2	United States	232

Finals
1	India	224
6	United States	222
Third place
4	Bye
3	Chinese Taipei

==== Women's team - Finals ====
Quarterfinals
1	United States	228
8	Poland	188
5	Mexico	225
4	Canada	224
3	India	225
6	Italy	215
7	Australia	206
2	Chinese Taipei	226

Semifinals
1	United States	225^{29}
5	Mexico	225^{28}
3	India	224
2	Chinese Taipei	227

Finals
1	United States	227
2	Chinese Taipei	224
Third place
5	Mexico	221
3	India	210

=== Junior events - Recurve (Under-18) ===
Event	Gold	Silver	Bronze
Men's individual	Alex Sillitoe Price; Great Britain	Park Myung-jae; South Korea	Cho Se-hyun; South Korea
Women's individual	Sharvari Somnath Shende; India	Kim Ye-won; South Korea	Kim Min-jeong; South Korea
Men's team	South Korea; Park Myung-jae; Cho Se-hyun; Lee Ji-ho	Chinese Taipei; Chen Pin-an; Sie Ming-jyun; Wu Yen-hao	Turkey; Mehfet Eve Cevik; Faruk Topuz; Arda Ege Donmezguc
Women's team	South Korea; Kim Min-jeong; Kim Ye-won; Yun Ga-young	Chinese Taipei; Kao Hui-tang; Weng Shih-chieh; Liu Jia-yun	India; Gatha Anandrao Khadake; Jiana Kumar; Sharvari Somnath Shende
Mixed Team	South Korea; Kim Min-jeong; Park Myung-jae	United States; Ye-eun Whang; Jackson Miller	India; Gatha Anandrao Khadake; Agastay Singh

==== Men's individual - Finals ====
Quarterfinals
33	(Ukraine) Serhii Seniura	6^{10}	28	27	28	28	25
24	(Individual Neutral Athletes) Hleb Akunevich	5^{8}	29	27	28	28	24
21	(Slovenia) Samo Vrbec	3	28	26	29	26	28
4	(United Kingdom) Alex Sillitoe Price	7	27	29	29	28	30
3	(South Korea) Cho Se-hyun	6^{9+}	27	29	28	27	28
11	(India) Agastay Singh	5^{9}	28	28	29	27	27
7	(Turkey) Mehmet Efe Çevik	4	28	27	28	27	29
2	(South Korea) Park Myung-jae	6	20	29	28	29	29

Semifinals
33	(Ukraine) Serhii Seniura	4	27	26	24	29	28
4	(United Kingdom) Alex Sillitoe Price	6	27	27	27	28	28
3	(South Korea) Cho Se-hyun	2	22	29	21	27
2	(South Korea) Park Myung-jae	6	26	25	29	29

Finals
4	(United Kingdom) Alex Sillitoe Price	6	29	30	28
2	(South Korea) Park Myung-jae	0	27	26	27
Third place
33	(Ukraine) Seniura Serhii	2	27	26	27	24
3	(South Korea) Cho Se-hyun	6	27	26	28	26

==== Women's individual - Finals ====
Quarterfinals
1	(South Korea) Kim Min-jeong	6	28	29	29
24	(Germany) Frida Janke	0	25	26	28
5	(United States) Ye-eun Whang	3	26	25	27	27	27
20	(India) Sharvari Somnath Shende	7	25	25	30	28	29
3	(South Korea) Kim Ye-won	6	29	29	29	28
6	(Indonesia) Fathiyya Erista Maharani	2	25	27	29	28
7	(South Korea) Yun Ga-young	0	28	27	27
2	(Chinese Taipei) Kao Hui-tang	6	29	29	28

Semifinals
1	(South Korea) Kim Min-jeong	3	26	29	26	27	27
20	(India) Sharvari Somnath Shende	7	27	24	28	27	28
3	(South Korea) Kim Ye-won	7	27	25	29	27	27
2	(Chinese Taipei) Kao Hui-tang	3	27	28	28	26	26

Finals
20	(India) Sharvari Somnath Shende	6^{10}	26	27	26	25	24
3	(South Korea) Kim Ye-won	5^{9}	24	27	25	28	26
Third place
1	(South Korea) Kim Min-jeong	7	28	30	26	26
2	(Chinese Taipei) Kao Hui-tang	1	25	28	26	23

==== Men's Team - Finals ====
Quarterfinals
1	South Korea	6	54	56	57	55
8	Indonesia	2	56	52	52	54
5	Spain	0	53	52	50
4	Turkey	6	58	53	54
3	Chinese Taipei	6	54	52	55	56
6	United States	2	55	43	52	55
7	India	5	53	54	56	54
2	Japan	3	52	55	53	54

Semifinals
1	South Korea	5	54	59	58
4	Turkey	1	54	57	57
3	Chinese Taipei	5	53	54	58	55
7	India	3	53	56	55	54

Finals
1	South Korea	5	57	54	55
3	Chinese Taipei	1	44	54	51
Third place
4	Turkey	5	56	55	58	56
7	India	3	52	57	56	56

==== Women's Team - Finals ====
Quarterfinals
1	South Korea	6	57	58	59
8	Indonesia	0	55	53	53
5	Japan	3	53	52	54	52
4	India	5	52	53	54	53
3	United States	6	56	51	55
6	Germany	0	51	49	53
10	United Arab Emirates	3	53	56	56	50
2	Chinese Taipei	5	54	56	54	58

Semifinals
1	South Korea	6	58	57	56	59
4	India	2	54	56	58	58
3	United States	0	50	54	52
2	Chinese Taipei	6	55	56	56

Finals
1	South Korea	6	45	56	58	56
2	Chinese Taipei	2	51	54	48	50
Third place
4	India	6	55	59	55
3	United States	0	53	56	52

==== Mixed Team - Finals ====
Quarterfinals
1	Chinese Taipei	6	36	34	37
8	Japan	0	30	33	36
5	United States	5	38	39	25	38
4	Turkey	3	35	37	37	38
19	Georgia	1	31	37	33
6	India	5	33	37	37
7	Spain	1	29	35	38
2	South Korea	5	38	37	38

Semifinals
1	Chinese Taipei	2	36	38	35	32
5	United States	6	38	36	39	37
6	India	0	36	37	34
2	South Korea	6	38	38	38

Finals
5	United States	2	36	35	40	35
2	South Korea	6	39	35	38	36
Third place
1	Chinese Taipei	3	35	36	36	35
6	India	5	37	37	31	35
