= Archery at the 2026 Asian Games – Women's team compound =

Women's team compound at the 2026 Asian Games
- Venue: Okazaki Central General Park
- Dates: 26–30 September 2026
- Competitors: 38 from 10 nations

Medalists
| gold medal | India (IND); Chikitha Taniparthi, Jyothi Surekha, Prithika Pradeep |
| silver medal | China (CHN); Wang Yue, Wei Fangyao, Wunier |
| bronze medal | South Korea (KOR); Kang Yeon-seo, Park Jung-yoon, Park Ye-rin |

The women's team compound archery competition at the 2026 Asian Games was held from 26 to 30 September 2026 at Okazaki Central General Park. India successfully defended its title from the 2022 Asian Games, winning the gold medal by defeating China in the final with a world-record score of 238 points. South Korea won the bronze medal.

== Schedule ==
All times are Japan Standard Time (UTC+09:00)

| Date | Day | Time | Event |
|---|---|---|---|
| 26 September | Saturday | 08:00 | Qualification round |
| 27 September | Sunday | 08:15 | 1/8 eliminations |
| 27 September | Wednesday | 08:45 | Quarterfinals |
| 30 September | Wednesday | 09:30 | Semifinals |
| 30 September | Wednesday | 10:25 | Bronze medal match |
| 30 September | Wednesday | 10:50 | Gold medal match |

== Results ==
=== Qualification round ===
| Rank | Team | Half | | Total | 10s | Xs |
| Rank | Team | 1st | 2nd | Total | 10s | Xs |
|---|---|---|---|---|---|---|
| 1 | China (CHN) | 1049 | 1050 | 2099 | 82 | 76 |
| | Wu Wunier | 351 | 350 | 701 | 26 | 27 |
| | Wei Fangyao | 349 | 351 | 700 | 29 | 25 |
| | Wang Yue | 349 | 349 | 698 | 27 | 24 |
| 2 | India (IND) | 1053 | 1046 | 2099 | 74 | 84 |
| | Chikitha Taniparthi | 355 | 350 | 705 | 30 | 28 |
| | Jyothi Surekha | 348 | 351 | 699 | 23 | 28 |
| | Prithika Pradeep | 350 | 345 | 695 | 21 | 28 |
| 3 | South Korea (KOR) | 1047 | 1049 | 2096 | 70 | 86 |
| | Park Jung-yoon | 348 | 354 | 702 | 32 | 24 |
| | Kang Yeon-seo | 353 | 348 | 701 | 26 | 28 |
| | Park Ye-rin | 346 | 347 | 693 | 28 | 18 |
| 4 | Indonesia (INA) | 1041 | 1052 | 2093 | 73 | 79 |
| | Nurisa Dian Ashrifah | 348 | 353 | 701 | 32 | 21 |
| | Yurike Nina Bonita Pereira | 348 | 351 | 699 | 29 | 23 |
| | Ratih Zilizati Fadhly | 345 | 348 | 693 | 18 | 29 |
| 5 | Chinese Taipei (TPE) | 1040 | 1051 | 2091 | 56 | 95 |
| | Chen Fang-yi | 348 | 350 | 698 | 34 | 17 |
| | Chen Yi-hsuan | 350 | 347 | 697 | 31 | 19 |
| | Huang I-jou | 348 | 348 | 696 | 30 | 20 |
| 6 | Iran (IRN) | 1041 | 1046 | 2087 | 66 | 81 |
| | Bita Asheghzadeh Oskouei | 353 | 351 | 704 | 31 | 25 |
| | Geesa Bybordy | 349 | 346 | 695 | 28 | 21 |
| | Shiva Bakhtiari | 345 | 343 | 688 | 22 | 21 |
| 7 | Kazakhstan (KAZ) | 1037 | 1044 | 2081 | 65 | 79 |
| | Viktoriya Lyan | 349 | 351 | 700 | 23 | 31 |
| | Adel Zhexenbinova | 345 | 347 | 692 | 30 | 16 |
| | Roxana Yunussova | 339 | 350 | 689 | 26 | 18 |
| 8 | Malaysia (MAS) | 1032 | 1046 | 2076 | 55 | 88 |
| | Fatin Nurfatehah Mat Salleh | 349 | 351 | 700 | 31 | 22 |
| | Iman Aisyah Norazam | 345 | 348 | 693 | 32 | 18 |
| | Aina Syazwana Abdul Muhaimin | 337 | 346 | 683 | 25 | 15 |
| 9 | Vietnam (VIE) | 1033 | 1041 | 2074 | 64 | 81 |
| | Lê Phạm Ngọc Anh | 347 | 354 | 701 | 28 | 25 |
| | Nguyen Thi Thanh Thao | 347 | 341 | 688 | 26 | 17 |
| | Lê Thùy Phương Nhi | 349 | 336 | 685 | 27 | 22 |
| 10 | Bangladesh (BAN) | 1025 | 1042 | 2067 | 51 | 77 |
| | Bonna Akter | 348 | 349 | 697 | 23 | 26 |
| | Most Kulsum Akther Mone | 342 | 350 | 692 | 31 | 13 |
| | Puspita Zaman | 339 | 339 | 678 | 23 | 12 |

=== Knockout round ===
1/8 eliminations
9 | Vietnam | 229
8 | Malaysia | 227
5 | Chinese Taipei | 236
12 | Philippines | 227
13 | Hong Kong | 224
4 | Indonesia | 238
3 | South Korea | 234
14 | United Arab Emirates | 225
11 | Thailand | 231
6 | Iran | 231
7 | Kazakhstan | 229
10 | Bangladesh | 228
15 | Mongolia | 223
2 | India | 238

Quarterfinals
1 | China | 226
9 | Vietnam | 223
5 | Chinese Taipei | 234
4 | Indonesia | 227
3 | South Korea | 230
6 | Thailand | 230
7 | Kazakhstan | 230
2 | India | 233

Semifinals
1 | China | 230
5 | Chinese Taipei | 229
3 | South Korea | 233
2 | India | 234

Gold medal match
1 | China | 234
2 | India | 238
Bronze medal match
5 | Chinese Taipei | 228
3 | South Korea | 229
