= Nisha =

Nisha, meaning "night" in Sanskrit (निशा, nishā), is an Indian female given name. Notable people with the name include:

- Nisha Adhikari, Nepalese actress
- Nisha Agarwal (born 1989), Indian actress
- Nisha Ali (born 1986), Indian-born Emirati cricketer
- Nisha Ayub (born 1979), Malaysian transgender rights activist
- Nisha Bano, Indian actress and singer
- Nisha Desai Biswal (born 1968), Indian-American humanitarian political administrator
- Nisha Botchwey, Jamaican-American academic administrator
- Nisha Chaudhary (1952–2001), Indian politician
- Nisha Dahiya (born 1998), Indian freestyle wrestler
- Nisha Dangi, Nepalese politician
- Nisha Rani Dutta, Indian archer
- Nisha Ganatra (born 1974), Canadian-American film director and actress
- Nisha Ganesh, Indian actress
- Nisha Kalema, Ugandan actress
- Nisha Katona (born 1971), British restaurateur and television personality
- Nisha Madhan, New Zealand actor, director and producer
- Nisha Madhulika (born 1959), Indian chef and YouTuber
- Nisha Mehta (born 1987), Nepalese politician and nurse
- Nisha Millet (born 1982), Indian swimmer
- Nisha Mohota (born 1980), Indian chess player
- Nisha Nagpal, Indian television actress
- Nisha Nayar, British actress
- Nisha Noor (1962–2007), Indian actress
- Nisha Pahuja (born 1967), Canadian independent filmmaker
- Nisha Patel-Nasri (1977–2006), British police officer
- Nisha Pillai, Indian journalist based in London
- Nisha Rajagopalan (born 1980), Indian singer
- Nisha Rao, Pakistani lawyer and activist
- Nisha Ravikrishnan, Indian Kannada film actress
- Nisha Rawal (born 1980), Indian actress
- Nisha Rawal (taekwondo) (born 1995), Nepalese taekwondo athlete and coach
- Nisha Sarangh, Indian actress
- Nisha Sharma (field hockey) (born 1959), Indian hockey player
- Nisha Sharma (author), American romance novelist
- Nisha Sharma (actor) (born 1971), Nepalese actress
- Nisha Singh (born 1979), Indian politician
- Nisha Vora, American cookbook author and blogger
- Nisha Warsi (born 1995), Indian field hockey player
