= T. G. Mani Ratnam =

Indian compound archer

Thirumuru Ganesh Mani Ratnam
Personal information
- Nationality: Indian
- Born: 9 May 2006 (age 20)
- Education: SRM Institute of Science and Technology

Sport
- Country: India
- Sport: Archery
- Event: Compound
Medal record
Men's compound archery
Representing India
Asian Games
Gold medal – first place	2026 Aichi–Nagoya	Team
Bronze medal – third place	2026 Aichi–Nagoya	Individual

Thirumuru Ganesh Mani Ratnam (also known as Ganesh Mani Ratnam Thirumuru) (born 9 May 2006) is an Indian compound archer who competes for India in international competitions. He represents Andhra Pradesh in domestic competitions. He was selected to represent India in the men's compound archery team at the 2026 Asian Games.

== Career ==
Ganesh Mani Ratnam competed internationally in the World Archery Under-21 compound category. At the 2024 Asian Archery Youth Championships in Taipei, he won the individual compound Under-21 men's gold medal. He defeated Wu Z Wei of Chinese Taipei 146–141 in the final and also won the team gold medal with India.

In August 2024, he competed in the junior compound men's category at the first NTPC National Ranking Archery Tournament in Guwahati. He reached the later stages of the elimination competition and recorded a 146–142 victory over Abhi Khatri in the quarter-final stage.

In January 2026, Ganesh Mani Ratnam competed at the Nîmes Archery Tournament, part of the Indoor World Series. He reached the quarter-finals of the Under-21 men's compound competition, defeating Noah Nuber of Germany 148–146. He subsequently won the Under-21 men's compound competition at the Taipei Archery Open, an Indoor World Series event, defeating Chen Hsien Jui of Chinese Taipei 149–138 in the final.

At the third National Ranking Archery Tournament in February 2026, he won the senior men's compound competition. He also finished first in the junior men's compound category at the same tournament.

== International career ==
In 2026, Ganesh Mani Ratnam was selected for the Indian compound men's team for the 2026 Asian Games in Aichi and Nagoya, alongside Sahil Jadhav and Kushal Dalal. His selection came after the Indian trials, where he secured the third and final men's compound quota place behind Sahil Jadhav and Kushal Dalal.

He was also selected for India at the 2026 Archery World Cup stages in Antalya and Madrid.

At the Antalya World Cup stage, he competed in the senior men's compound event and recorded a qualification score of 703.

== Education ==
Ganesh Mani Ratnam is a student of SRM Institute of Science and Technology, where he is enrolled in the Bachelor of Computer Applications programme.

== See also ==
- India at the 2026 Asian Games
- Archery in India
- Archery Association of India
- World Archery
