= Chero Archers =

Jharkhand based archery franchise

- Full name: Chero Archers
- Sport: Archery
- Founded: 2025
- League: Archery Premier League
- Owner: Tata Steel
- Head coach: Purnima Mahato

Chero Archers is a professional archery franchise. Based in Ranchi, Jharkhand, it competes in the Archery Premier League.

== Background ==
The team is named as a tribute to folk hero Medini Rai after whom Jharkhand's city Medininagar is named. The place is fondly known as the Chero Napoleon.

== Squad ==
=== 2025 ===
Player	Nationality
Recurve
Katharina Bauer	Germany
Rahul Pawariya	India
Atanu Das	India
Kumkum Mohod	India
Compound
Mathias Fullerton	Denmark
Prithika Pradeep	India
Madala Hamsini	India
Sahil Jadhav	India

== Staff & personnel ==
=== Coaches ===
Coach	Duration	Best Result	Ref
Purnima Mahato	2025–present	Semi Finals	

== Performance record ==
Season	Standing	Result	Matches	Won	Lost	Most Points
2025	4/6	Semi Finals	10	4	6	Mathias Fullerton
0 Titles						Mathias Fullerton

== Player statistics ==
=== Most points ===
Rank	Player	Nationality	Points
1	Mathias Fullerton	Denmark	770
2	Prithika Pradeep	India	757
3	Katharina Bauer	Germany	728
4	Atanu Das	India	656
5	Rahul Pawariya	India	72

=== Arrow average ===
Rank	Player	Nationality	Points
1	Mathias Fullerton	Denmark	9.87
2	Prithika Pradeep	India	9.46
3	Atanu Das	India	9.11
4	Katharina Bauer	Germany	9.10
