= Archery Premier League =

Indian archery league

- Current season, competition or edition: 2025 Archery Premier League
- Sport: Archery
- Founded: 2025; 1 year ago
- First season: 2025
- Administrator: Archery Association of India
- No. of teams: 6
- Country: India
- Most recent champion: Rajputana Royals (2025)
- Broadcaster: SonyLIV
- Tournament format: Double round-robin Knock-out

Archery Premier League, abbreviated as APL, is a professional archery league based in India. Organized by Archery Association of India, the governing body for the sport, it is the first franchise-based archery league in the world. The first edition of the league was launched in 2025 in New Delhi.

== History ==
The first edition of Archery Premier League was held at the Yamuna Sports Complex in New Delhi from 2 to 12 October 2025. The league is backed by both World Archery and World Archery Asia. Prithviraaj Yodhas, Kakatiya Knights, Rajputana Royals, Chero Archers, Mighty Marathas and Chola Chiefs were announced as the six teams. Ram Charan was revealed to be the official brand ambassador of the league.

== Format ==
Archery Premier League features 36 Indian archers and 12 top foreign archers who will be divided into six franchises. A draft system was followed instead of an auction for the inaugural edition of the league.

Each franchise comprises eight members, four men and four women. Each team includes up to two foreign archers, with at least one of them required to be part of the playing four. The league has mixed team duels in recurve and compound. Round robin fixtures will see 3 matches per day, each lasting 20 minutes. The arrow shooting time has been reduced to 15 seconds from the internationally allotted 20 seconds.

== Teams ==
Locations of the Archery Premier League teams

Team	State	Coach
Chero Archers	Jharkhand	Purnima Mahato
Chola Chiefs	Tamil Nadu	Sonam Tshering Bhutia
Kakatiya Knights	Telangana	Rahul Banerjee
Mighty Marathas	Maharashtra	Pravin Sawant
Prithviraaj Yodhas	Delhi	Lokesh Chand
Rajputana Royals	Rajasthan	Jiwanjot Singh Teja

== Editions and results ==
Season	Winner	Score	Runner up	Venue	Teams	Player Of The Tournament
2025	Rajputana Royals	4–4 (2–0)	Prithviraaj Yodhas	Yamuna Sports Complex	6	Dhiraj Bommadevara* (RM) Ankita Bhakat* (RW) Mike Schloesser* (CM) Ella Gibson* (CW)

*Based on Average Arrow score after Matchday 12.

== Broadcasting ==
- SonyLIV
- Archery+

== See also ==
- Archery in India
- Sport in India
