= Raj Kaur (archer) =

Indian archer

Personal information
- Born: 35–36
- Education: Graduate at Punjab University
- Occupation(s): Archer, constable in Punjab Police
- Years active: 2016 – present
- Employer: Punjab Police
- Parent: Inderjeet Kaur
- Other interests: Archery

Sport
- Country: India
- Sport: Archery
- Rank: 149
- Team: Archery Association of India
- Coached by: Surinder

Achievements and titles
- World finals: 2019 World Archery Championships (women's compound)

Raj Kaur is an Indian professional archer. She won the bronze medal in the women's compound division at the 2019 World Archery Championships held from 10 June to 16 June 2019 at 's-Hertogenbosch, Netherlands. The Indian women's compound team of Muskan Kirar, Jyothi Surekha Vennam, and Raj Kaur defeated Turkey 229-226.

She has also participated in Asian Games.

== Early life ==
Raj Kaur lives in Amritsar, Punjab. She left the Border Security Force and presently works as a police constable in Punjab police. Her father Mr. Inderjeet is also working as a constable in the Punjab police.

== See also ==
- Indian Archers
- Muskan Kirar
- Jyothi Surekha Vennam
