= Tanisha (name) =

Name list

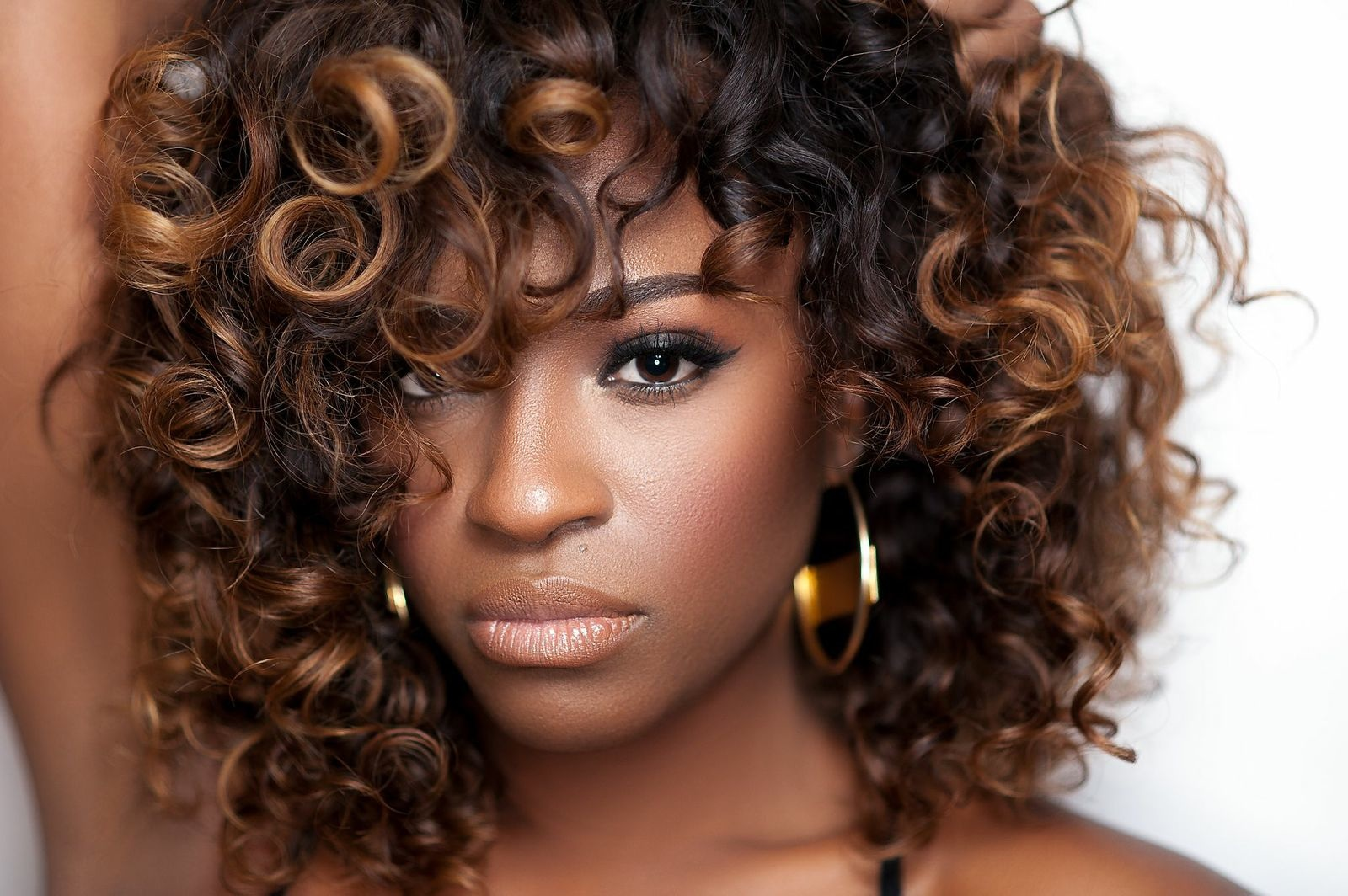
- Canadian choreographer Tanisha Scott, best known for collaborating with Rihanna, Alicia Keys, Sean Paul and Beyoncé.
- Pronunciation: Tanīṣā, tuh-NEE-shuh, ta-NEE-shah
- Gender: Female

Origin
- Origin: Sanskrit
- Meaning: Ambition (Sanskrit); Born on Monday (Hausa, English); Happiness (Arabic), Benevolent ruler (Urdu), Child saint (Urdu)
- Region of origin: South Asia

Tanisha is a feminine given name in many cultures.

In the Sanskrit language, Tanisha is the feminine equivalent of the name Tanish and persons with the name are commonly Hindu by religion or of the Indo-Aryan peoples.

Tanisha is a Hausa variant transcription of the name Tani (Hausa and English) and means born on a Monday in Hausa.

Tanisha is also a variant transcription of the name Tansy (English). It can also be a combination of Ta- with Aisha.

Tanisha meaning child saint is spelled `Tana Shah' in Urdu or as Tani Shah, meaning "benevolent ruler".

== Popularity ==
The name Tanisha appears in Swahili, English, Arabic, Japanese & Urdu.

=== Japan ===
The name Tanisha when pronounced tah-nEE-shah; in Japanese is タニーシャ with the romaji tani-sha. Tanisha as a non-Japanese name is properly rendered in Japanese using katakana タニシャ. Tanisha rendered in hiragana generally is considered to be more feminine. Tanisha in hiragana is たにいしゃ and has the romaji taniisha. Notice that the hiragana rendering differs from the katakana due to the fact that katakana has fairly recently evolved to better render non-Japanese sounds into Japanese. The katakana and hiragana only render the syllable sounds and has no meaning in Japanese.

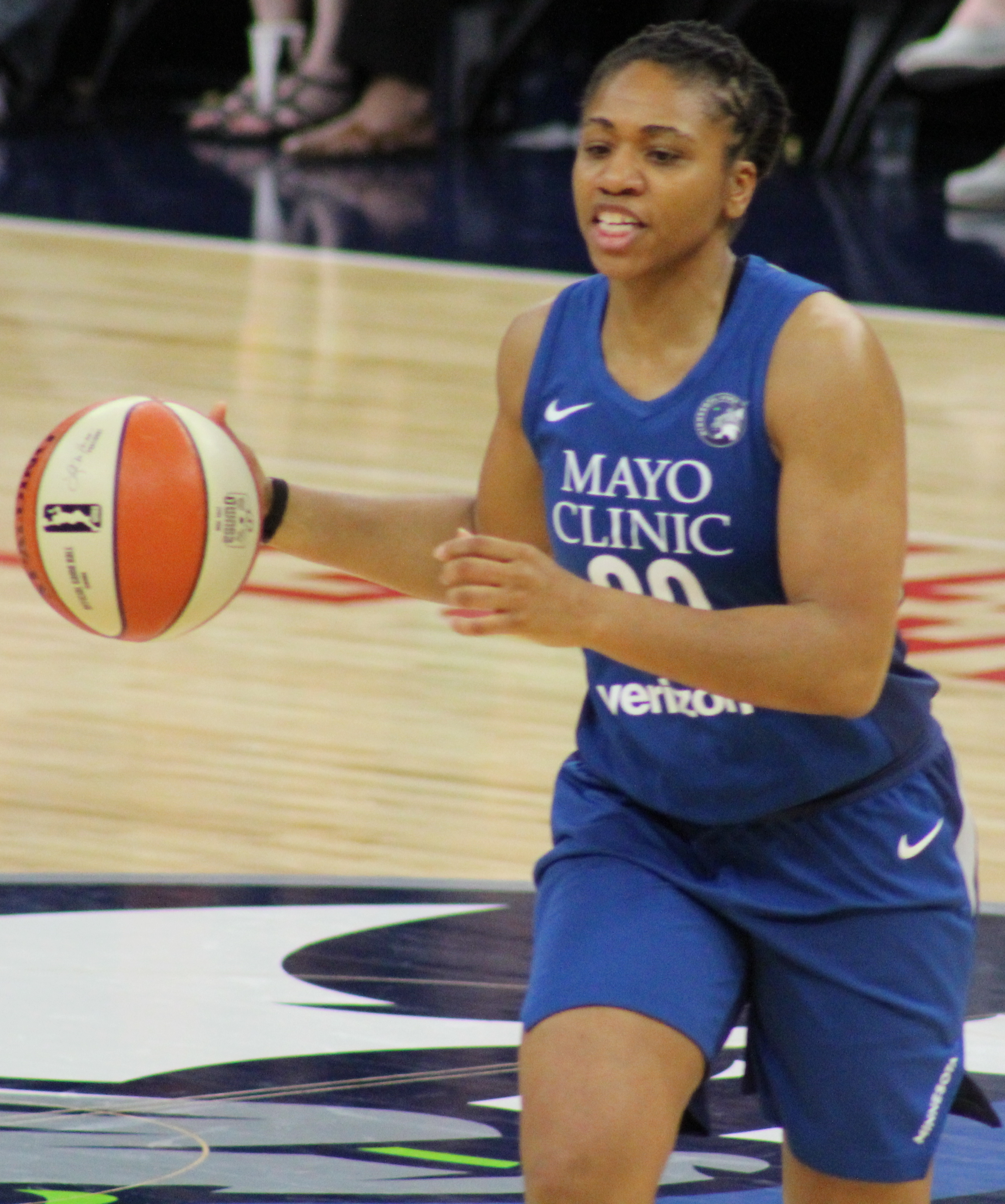
American basketball coach Tanisha Wright, part of the Minnesota Lynx in 2018.

=== United States ===
In the United States, it is a predominantly African-American name first popularized in the 1960s by the actress Ta-Tanisha, who appeared on the television program Room 222. Ta-Tanisha loosely translated in Swahili means "Puzzling One".

The American English pronunciation of Tanisha \t(a)-ni-sha\ is ta-NEE-shah or tuh-NEE-shuh. By the 1970s and 1980s, it had become common within the African American culture to invent new names, although many of the invented names took elements from popular existing names. Prefixes such as La/Le, Da/De, Ra/Re, or Ja/Je are common, as well as inventive spellings for the name Tanisha.

US Popularity by Rank top 1000 names

Year of birth	Rank	Year of birth	Rank
1998	856	1984	351
1997	733	1984	351
1996	554	1983	320
1995	534	1982	318
1994	442	1981	339
1993	434	1980	324
1992	387	1979	344
1991	376	1978	335
1990	387	1977	321
1989	401	1976	339
1988	388	1975	345
1987	350	1974	354
1986	350	1973	389
1985	369	1972	352

Note: Rank 1 is the most popular, rank 2 is the next most popular, and so forth. Data are not shown for some of the years specified because the name Tanisha was not in the top 1000 names for those years. Name data are from Social Security card applications for births that occurred in the United States.

Records indicate that 17,012 girls in the United States have been named Tanisha since 1880. The greatest number of infants were given this name in 1982; that year, 756 infants in the U.S. were named Tanisha. This cohort is now 44 years old, part of the early Millennial generation.

==== Prejudice ====
In the United States, the name Tanisha is primarily known as an African-American name. The name Tanisha has been used as an example of a stereotypical African-American name that elicits racial bias, in articles addressing institutional racism that Black Americans face when seeking employment, housing, bank loans and credit cards.

The National Bureau of Economic Research in Massachusetts released the results of a field experiment on Labour discrimination titled "ARE EMILY AND GREG MORE EMPLOYABLE THAN LAKISHA AND JAMAL?" by Marianne Bertrand and Sendhil Mullainathan. During the field experiment, job applicants in Massachusetts with the name Tanisha was called back 6.3%; resumes with a more White-sounding name have a 10.08% call back rate.

== Spellings ==
Common spellings for Tanisha:

Country	Language	Spelling	Source
United States	English		
United States	English	Tanishia	
United States	English	Tenishia	
United States	English	Tanesha	
United States	English	Taneshia	
United States	English	Tinisha	
United States	English	Tanysha	
United States	English	Tenesha	
United States	English	Tenisha	
United States	English	Tynisha	
United States	English	Taneisha	
United States	English	Taneesha	
United States	English	Tinesha	

Country	Language	Spelling	Source
India	Hindi	तनीषा	
Japan	Kanji	多仁志矢	
Japan	Katakana	タニシャ	
Japan	Japanese	タニーシャ	
Japan	Hiragana	たにしゃ	
China	Chinese	覃妮莎	
	Arabic	تـانيـشــا	
Bulgaria	Bulgarian	Таниша	
Israel	Hebrew	טנישה	
Java	Javanese	Sanjana	
India	Kannada	ತನೀಶಾ	

Country	Language	Spelling	Source
Korea	Korean	타니사	
Serbia	Serbian Cyrillic	Танисха	
Sri Lanka	Sinhala	ටනිශා	
India	Tamil	தனிஷா	
India	Telugu	తనీషా	
Europe	Yiddish	טאַנישאַ	

== People ==
=== Media ===
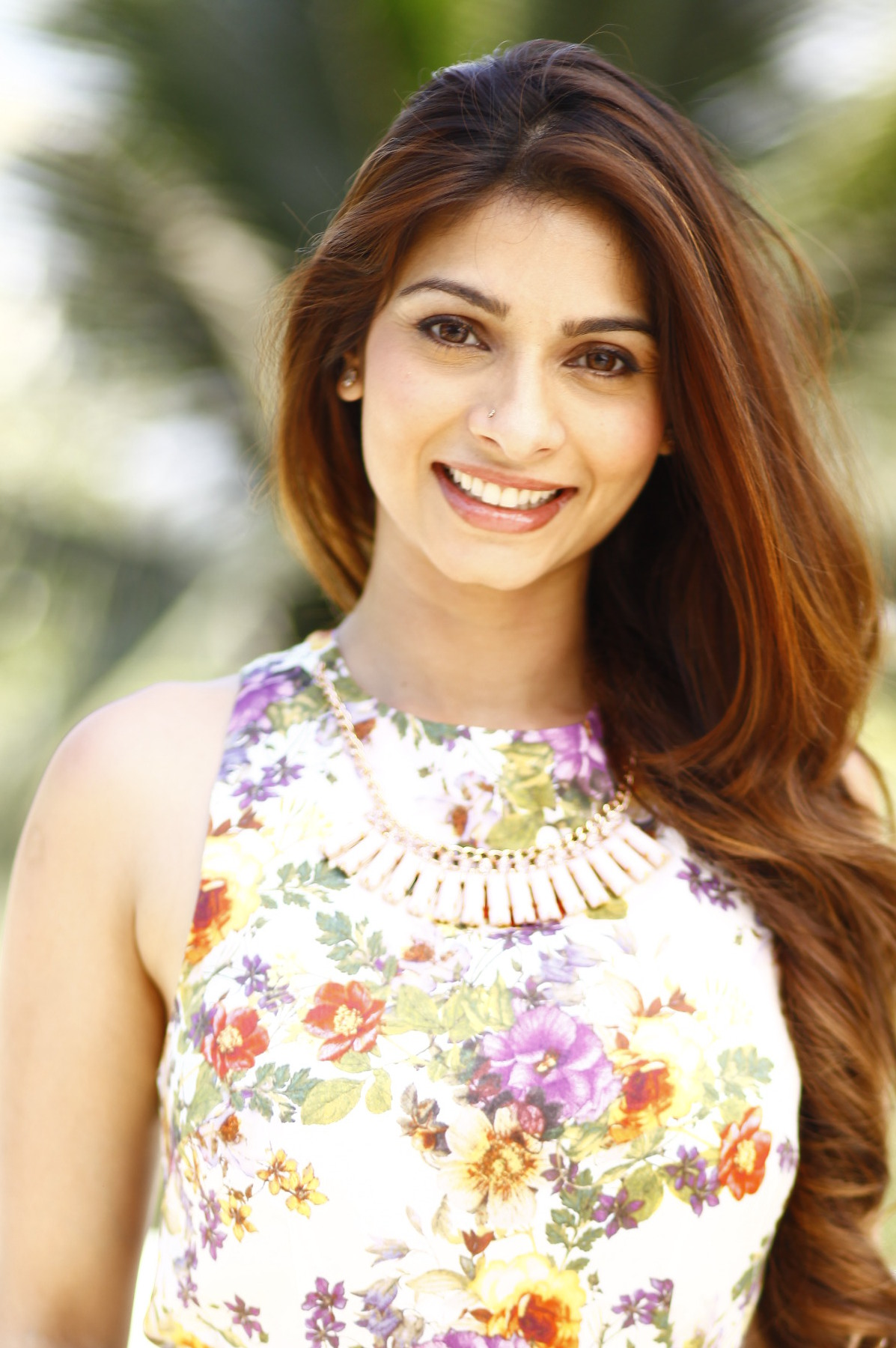
Actress Tanishaa Mukerji in 2015

- Tanishaa Mukerji (born 1978), Bollywood actress
- Tanisha Thomas (born 1985), Reality TV Star, Host
- Tanisha Mariko Harper (born 1981), model, actress and television host
- Tanisha Tamara Drummond Johnson (born c. 1976), Panamanian model and beauty pageant contestant winner of the Señorita Panamá 1997
- Tanisha Lynn Eanes (born 1978 in Houston, Texas), American actress
- Tanisha Scott (born in Toronto, Canada), three-time MTV VMA-nominated choreographer
- Tanisha Nicole Brito (born 1980), beauty queen who has competed at both Miss America and Miss USA
- Tanisha Malone, Winner of the 2006 edition of Mo'Nique's Fat Chance a reality TV miniseries
- Tanisha Yarndriciaes Delores Neal, uses the pseudonym Toni Neal (born 1976), broadcaster
- Tanisha Belnap, contestant on So You Think You Can Dance (U.S. season 11) an American dance competition show
- Tanisha contestant on Big Brother (Switzerland) a reality game show franchise
- Tanisha Vernon (born 1987), beauty queen and winner of Miss Belize Universe 2007 pageant

=== Music ===
- Tanisha Michele Morgan, member of the female rap duo group BWP (Bytches With Problems)

=== Other ===
- Tanishia Covington (born 1992), convicted felon "2017 Chicago torture incident"

=== Pseudonym ===
- Ta-Tanisha (born Shirley Cummings, in 1953) American character actress

=== Sports ===
- Tanisha Lovely Wright (born 1983), American women's basketball player

=== Title ===
Tanisha is a popularly declared title usually bestowed by the people.

- Abul Hasan Qutb Shah nicknamed as 'Tana Shah' meaning child saint also known as Abul Hasan Tana Shah or Tani Shah meaning "benevolent ruler". The Tannashah, Tánėshá or Tánísha (a title) was a Nabob of Golconda.

== Fictional characters ==
=== Filmography ===
- Tanisha, the emperor of Golconda - role played by Nassar in the 2006 Telugu Devotional Movie Sri Ramadasu directed by K. Raghavendra Rao.
- Tanisha, role played by Tanusree Chakraborty in the 2012 Bengali drama film Bedroom directed by Mainak Bhaumik.
- Private Tanisha Robinson, role played by Michelle Buteau - Enlisted (TV series).
- Tanisha, role played by Preeti Puri - Mamta (TV series).

=== Literature ===
- Tanisha - A Shikaza woman also known as Kahutu, first appearance in the first edition Imaro (novel), written by Charles R. Saunders.
- Tanisha - (initial Key holder, resigned) The Council Wars, an in-progress book series by John Ringo.

^{video games}_{Tanisha - a character in gta v}

== See also ==
- Nisha (disambiguation)
- Tanish (name)
- Tanisha (disambiguation)
- Tanya (name)
