= Rajputana Royals =

Rajasthan based archery franchise

- Full name: Rajputana Royals
- Sport: Archery
- Founded: 2025
- League: Archery Premier League
- Colors
- Head coach: Jiwanjot Singh Teja
- Winners: 2025

Rajputana Royals is a professional archery franchise. Based in Jaipur, Rajasthan, it competes in the Archery Premier League. The team won the 2025 edition.

== Squad ==
=== 2025 ===
Player	Nationality
Recurve
Mete Gazoz	Turkey
Ankita Bhakat	India
Basanti Mahato	India
Sachin Gupta	India
Compound
Ella Gibson	United Kingdom
Swati Dudhwal	India
Prathamesh Fuge	India
Ojas Deotale	India

== Staff & personnel ==
=== Coaches ===
Coach	Duration	Best Result	Ref
Jiwanjot Singh Teja	2025–present	Champions	

== Performance record ==
Season	Standing	Result	Matches	Won	Lost
2025	1/6	Champions	10	8	2
1 title
