= Tanisha =

Tanisha may refer to:

- Tanisha (name), a feminine given name
  - Tanishaa (born 1978), Indian actress

== Arts, entertainment and media ==
=== Fictional characters ===
- Tanisha, from the 2013 Indian Hindi-language drama thriller film Sixteen
- Tanisha, from the American television series Cory in the House
- Tanisha, from the American television comedy-drama Shameless
- Tanisha Fonesca, a fictional character from the British soap opera Doctors
- Tanisha Jackson, from the Grand Theft Auto video game series

== Places ==
- Lake Tanisha, Dallas Paulding County, Georgia, US
