= Amar Nath Sehgal v. Union of India =

Indian legal case

- Court: Delhi High Court
- Decided: 21 February 2005
- Citation: 2005 (30) PTC 253 (Del)

Court membership
- Judge sitting: Justice P Nandrajog

Keywords
- moral rights in copyright

Amar Nath Sehgal v. Union of India is a landmark Indian case decided by the Delhi High Court, which for the first time upheld the moral right of an author under the Indian Copyright Act and awarded damages. The government was also asked to return his mural.

== Background ==
The plaintiff, Amar Nath Sehgal is a renowned artist and sculptor, who created a mural in the lobby of Vigyan Bhawan, Delhi on the direction of appropriate authority. In the year 1957, the Government of India commissioned Mr. Sehgal for creating a bronze mural for Vigyan Bhavan, the most prominent International Convention Hall in Delhi. The Bronze sculpture so commissioned, of about 140 ft. span and 40 ft. sweep took five years to complete and was placed on the wall of the Lobby in the Convention hall. This embellishment on a national architecture became a part of the Indian art heritage. However, in 1979, the mural was pulled down and consigned to the store room of the Union without notice or permission or authorization of Amarnath. When Mr. Sehgal came to know of this ill treatment, he made representations to the government authorities for restoration of the mural, to no avail. As this act of destruction of the mural as it was improperly handled which cause minor damage to the sculpture. He filed a petition under Section 57 of the Copyright Act, 1957 in the Delhi High Court praying for an apology from the defendants, a permanent injunction on the defendants to restrain them from distorting, mutilating or damaging the plaintiff's mural and damages to the tune of Rs. 5 lakhs.

== Judgment ==
The Court termed the Moral rights as the soul of the author's works. "The author has a right to preserve, protect and nurture his creations through his moral rights. A creative individual is uniquely invested with the power and mystique of original genius, creating a privileged relationship between a creative author and his work."

The Court elucidated on the moral rights that flow from art and literary work. They are identification right or attribution right, right to dissemination, Right to integrity that is to maintain the purity of work and right to withdraw from the publication of the work. The language of the Section 57 makes it possible to legally protect the cultural heritage of India through the moral rights of the artist. "Intellectual property and knowledge are interconnected. Intellectual property embodies traditional thought and knowledge with value addition. Thus, physical destruction or loss of intellectual property has far reaching social consequence. Knowledge which has grown with it is also lost." Court ruled that moral rights in the work of art acquire the status of the cultural heritage of the nation and India being a signatory to many conventions, it would be the obligation of the state to protect such work.

Further, Section 57 of the Copyright Act, 1957 includes destruction of a work of art as a ground as it is the extreme form of mutilation and reduces the volume of the author's creative corpus and affects his reputation prejudicially as being actionable under said section. Further, in relation to the work of an author, subject to the work attaining the status of a modern national treasure, the right would include an action to protect the integrity of the work in relation to the cultural heritage of the nation.

The Court held that the plaintiff has a cause to maintain an action under Section 57 of the Copyright Act, 1957 even though the copyright in the mural stands vested in the defendants. It was further held that the defendants have not only violated the plaintiff's moral right of integrity in the mural but have also violated the integrity of the work in relation to the cultural heritage of the nation. The Court ordered the defendants to return to the plaintiff the remnants of the mural permanently with no rights vesting with the defendants henceforth and ordered the defendants to pay damages with costs.

== Significance of the Decision ==
The decision taken by the single bench of the Delhi High Court was instrumental in determining the course of moral rights in the country. It also gave a broad construction to the term moral rights in the country, by not only providing for the right of the author in the case of any distortion, mutilation, modification or other act in relation to the work if such distortion etc. would be prejudicial to his honour or reputation but also ‘right of the author to receive the copyrighted work for the purposes of restoration and sell it’. It included within the moral right of integrity the right to protect an artistic work from outright destruction. The interim decision in the case, given by Justice Jaspal Singh, given in favour of the plaintiff, restricted the Indian Government from causing any further loss to the plaintiff by destroying the property. The interim ruling, given in 1992, established two central points about the ambit of moral rights within India. Firstly, that the moral right of integrity under Indian Law can in fact protect an artistic work from outright destruction and secondly, that the Government has a duty of care towards artworks in its possession. This gave rise to amendments in the Copyright Act in 1994. Even though the purported primary motive of the Government was to bring the Indian Act in conformity with the Berne Convention, the wording of the amendment seemed to be a direct reaction to the interim ruling. Under the amended Section 57, a legal claim by an author against unauthorized modifications to his work had to establish that the treatment of the work has been prejudicial to his honour or reputation. The revised Section 57 corresponded to Article 6bis of the Berne Convention and also provided that failure to display a work, or to display it in accordance with the wishes of the author, would not qualify as a violation of the author's moral rights.

In light of this amendment in 1994, an important question that Justice Nandrajog needed to address was that of which law would be applicable to the final ruling, the pre amendment or post amendment Copyright Act. There were compelling arguments for both the sides, as the old provisions of the Copyright Act would apply because they governed the time when the acts of destruction occurred, and when the case was actually filed before the court. On the other hand, he could have said that the post amended provisions should apply because they reflected the currently policy of the Govt. and were actually in force at the time of the judgment. However, he sidestepped the question and chose neither of the paths, arguing that the law must be read to fulfil the higher objective of protecting our cultural heritage, in light of the many international treaties on cultural heritage that India is a signatory to. The artwork in question constituted an ‘outstanding work of art’ and in such cases there is an overriding obligation to protect their integrity, no matter which law is applied.

== See also ==
- Indian law
