= Amarnath Sehgal =

Indian art educator

Amar Nath Sehgal
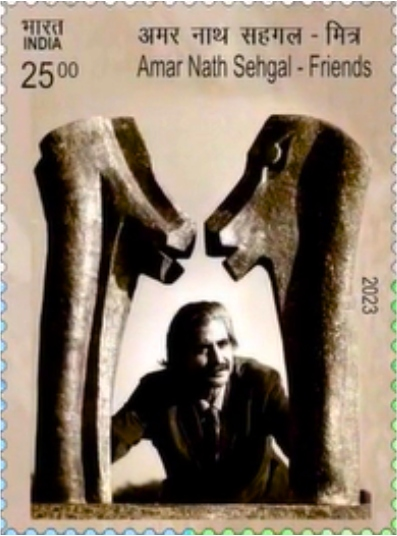
- Sehgal and his work "Friends" on a 2023 stamp of India
- Born: 5 February 1922; Campbellpur, Punjab, British India
- Died: 28 December 2007 (aged 85); New Delhi, India
- Occupations: sculptor, painter, art educator, poet

Amar Nath Sehgal (5 February 1922 – 28 December 2007) was an Indian modernist sculptor, painter, poet and art educator. He started his career as an engineer in Lahore, and later turned to art. He shifted to Delhi after partition of India in 1947, and in 1950 studied art education from New York University School of Education. Subsequently, became an art educator, teaching at College of Art, Delhi, and at the Modern School Barakhamba, New Delhi. However, he also ventured into painting, drawings, and poetry.

In 1979, Amar Nath Sehgal set up his studio in Luxembourg and lived between there and India until his return to New Delhi in 2004. He first visited Luxembourg in 1966, when he had his first solo exhibition at the National Museum of Archaeology, History and Art in Luxembourg City. His bronze bust sculpture of Mahatma Gandhi in the city's Municipal Park celebrates the strong connection he had with Luxembourg. The bronze bust, a gift by the philanthropist Henry J. Leir, was inaugurated on 21 June 1973 in the presence of Foreign Minister Gaston Thorn and the Ambassador of India to Luxembourg K. B. Lall. In January 1980, the original bust was stolen, and in 1982 Amar Nath Sehgal gifted a copy of the original which was inaugurated on 2 October 1982, on the 113th anniversary of Gandhi's birth.

Later in life, he also became a pioneer of intellectual property rights, especially moral rights in copyright for artists in India, after he fought a 13-year-long legal case with Government of India. A bronze mural which he created for the Vigyan Bhavan, Delhi in the 1960s, was removed without his consent, during renovations in 1979. He filed the case at Delhi High Court in 1992, and the courts finally awarded him damages in 2005.

In 1986, he founded "The Creative Fund" in Luxembourg to help young artists from Luxembourg and India discover the history, culture and heritage of both countries.

1993, he was awarded the Lalit Kala Akademi Fellowship by the Lalit Kala Akademi, India's National Academy of Art, the highest honour in the fine arts conferred by the Government of India. In 2008, he was posthumously awarded the Padma Bhushan, by Government of India.

== Early life and background ==
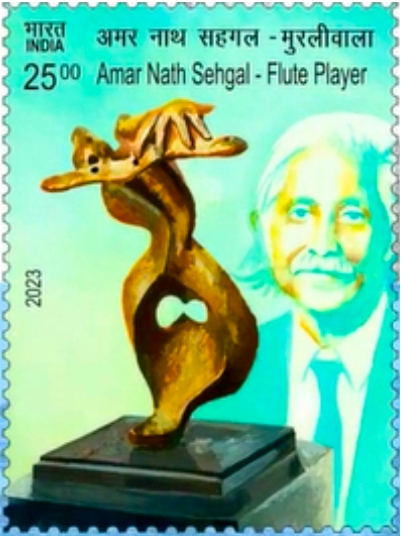
Sehgal and his work "Flute Player" on a 2023 stamp of India

Born on 5 February 1922, Sehgal was originally from Campbellpur (Attock), in North Punjab (now in Pakistan). He shifted to Lahore in 1939 to study at Government College, Lahore where he graduated in 1941. Thereafter he studied industrial chemistry at Banaras Hindu University till 1942. Subsequently, he started worked as an engineer in Lahore, while studying arts privately.

During the riots that preceded the partition of India in 1947, he left Lahore in May 1947 and travelled to Eastern Punjab and Kangra-Kullu Valley, with his family, where he witnessed macabre killings of local Muslim minority. This was to have a lasting impact both of his psyche and his art. Finally, he settled in Delhi, where he reestablished himself. In 1949, he crossed the Atlantic on a freight Harpalycus, for 47 days to New York. He met his god mother Miss Elmina Lucke, who convinced him to study in New York city and live in the East Village. He did both and later obtained a master's degree in art education from New York University School of Education (now renamed Steinhardt School of Culture, Education, and Human Development) in 1950. During this period he was exposed to world art and inspirations of Henri Matisse.

== Career ==
His first exhibition was inaugurated in New York in 1951, by India's permanent representative to the United Nations. Upon his return from US, Sehgal taught at the Modern School, New Delhi for a short while, and his wife Shukla Dhawan was also a teacher at its Junior School. Later he remained a faculty at College of Art, Delhi, University of Delhi and established his studio in Delhi. In time, he became a leading exponents of modernism in Indian sculptor. Themes of much of his oeuvre revolved around the importance of individual freedom and human dignity, and his response the horrors of political violence.

His works were exhibited in many places across the world, winning him international acclaim. Many of his sculptures in bronze and ceramic are in the collection of National Gallery of Modern Art, New Delhi.

" I am convinced that an artiste has a moral right to his work, even if it has been paid for by an individual or an organization."

— Amarnath Sehgal (The Hindu, 2006)

In 1957, he was commissioned to create a mural for the Vigyan Bhavan, India's first state convention center. The bronze mural spanned 140 feet by 40 feet, depicting rural and modern India, and was completed five years later and installed in the foyer of the building in 1962. Subsequently, in 1979, during renovations, the mural was removed without his consent, and shifted to the storehouse. When in the following years despite his request no action was taken, He filed a case at the Delhi High Court seeking damages. Thus Amar Nath Sehgal v. Union of India. After a 13-year-long legal proceeding, the case was finally decided in his favour on 21 February 2005. Thus it became a landmark case in Indian legal history, as for the first time uphold the moral right of an author under the Indian Copyright Act and awarded damages. The government was also asked to return his mural

Besides art, Sehgal was also a poet, he published two collection of his poems, Lonesome Journey (1996) and Awaiting a New Dawn (1998).

A bronze sculpture titled, The Captive, first designed by Sehgal for the UN conference on sanctions against South Africa, held in Paris in 1986 was later installed in Robben Island, Cape Town, Nelson Mandela's former island prison, on National Women's Day, 9 August 2011. In the following year, a large stone sculpture by him, "Aiming For Excellence" was installed at the DDA Yamuna Sports Complex in New Delhi. In October 2004, an exhibition of his paintings on Ramayana and Mahabharata, as "tribute to Rishi Valmiki and Rishi Vyasa" was inaugurated by then President A P J Abdul Kalam at the Indira Gandhi National Centre for the Arts .

The Lalit Kala Akademi, India's National Academy of Art, in 1993, awarded him the Lalit Kala Akademi Fellowship, the highest honour in the fine arts conferred by the Government of India. He had a close to the first Prime Minister Jawaharlal Nehru and subsequently the Nehru–Gandhi family.

He died on 28 December 2007 in New Delhi, at age 85, after a prolonged illness. In the following year, he was posthumously awarded the Padma Bhushan, by Government of India.

== Monographs and other works ==
- Amarnath Sehgal; Mulk Raj Anand (1964). Armanath Sehgal. Published by Mulk Raj Anand for Marg Publications.
- Amar Nath Sehgal-Selected Sculptures, Graphics and Drawings 1947–1972. National Gallery of Modern Art, Jaipur House. 1972.
- Amarnath Sehgal; Pran Nath Mago (1993). Amarnath Sehgal. Lalit Kala Akademi.
- Amarnath Sehgal (1996). Lonesome journey. Har-Anand Publications.
- Amarnath Sehgal (1998). Awaiting a New Dawn. Haranand Publications Pvt. Limited. ISBN 978-81-241-0554-2.
- Amarnath Sehgal (2005). Epic Episodes: Paintings on Ramayana and Mahabharata. Amar Nath Sehgal.

== Bibliography ==
- "Sculpture Today by Amarnath Sehgal". Art in India Today. United Nations Council of Indian Youth. 1972. pp. 99–106.
- Sunil Kumar Bhattacharya (1994). Trends in Modern Indian Art. M.D. Publications Pvt. Ltd. ISBN 978-81-85880-21-1.
- Pran Nath Mago (2001). Contemporary Art in India: A Perspective. National Book Trust, India. p. 185. ISBN 978-81-237-3420-0.
- Copyright in the Courts: How Moral Rights Won the Battle of the Mural. Wipro Magazine. 2007.
- Mandira Row (2023). "Seeking Catharsis in Sculpture". Iconic Masterpieces of Indian Modern Art Edition 02. D.A.G. Pvt. Ltd. pp. 477–493.
- Siddharth Sehgal (2022). Kindred spirits: in memory of my grandfather, Amar Nath Sehgal (1922-2007). Stir World.
