= Prithviraaj Yodhas =

Delhi based archery franchise

- Full name: Prithviraaj Yodhas
- Sport: Archery
- Founded: 2025
- League: Archery Premier League
- Colors
- Owner: Randeep Hooda; Lin Laishram; Vikas Garg
- Head coach: Lokesh Chand
- Runners Up: (silver) 2025

Prithviraaj Yodhas is a professional archery franchise. Based in New Delhi, Delhi, it competes in the Archery Premier League. The team emerged as the runners-up of the 2025 edition.

== Ownership ==
Randeep Hooda and Lin Laishram co-own Prithviraaj Yodhas with Vikas Garg.

== Squad ==
=== 2025 ===
Player	Nationality
Recurve
Matias Grande	Mexico
Gatha Khadake	India
Sharvari Shende	India
Krish Kumar	India
Compound
Andrea Becerra	Mexico
Abhishek Verma	India
Priyansh Kumar	India
Pranjal Salve	India

== Staff & personnel ==
=== Coaches ===
Coach	Duration	Best Result	Ref
Lokesh Chand	2025–present		

== Performance record ==
Season	Standing	Result	Matches	Won	Lost
2025	3/6	Runners Up	10	5	5
0 Titles, 1 Runners Up
