= Nisha Madhulika =

Indian chef and YouTuber (born 1959)

- Born: 4 September 1959 (age 66); Uttar Pradesh, India
- Occupation: Chef Youtuber
- Spouse: M.S. Gupta

YouTube information
- Channel: NishaMadhulika
- Years active: 2009–present
- Genre: Cooking
- Subscribers: 15.1 million
- Views: 3.53 billion
- Last updated: 10 January 2026
- Website: nishamadhulika.com/en

Nisha Madhulika (born 25 August 1959) is an Indian chef, YouTube personality and restaurant consultant. She also has food columns on several websites where she contributes to Indian Express, Amar Ujala, Times of India and Dainik Bhaskar. Nisha's speciality are mainly Indian cuisine.

== Early life and background ==
She was born to an Indian family in Uttar Pradesh, India. She has spent her childhood and college days in her hometown in Uttar Pradesh. Nisha is married to a tech entrepreneur and has two children.

== Career ==
Nisha Madhulika started cooking at an early age. She lived in Noida with her husband where she assisted in the husband's company. Nisha was struggling with empty nest syndrome. Nisha started a blog, writing on how to cook Indian vegetarian recipes in 2007 which led to her popularity.

In 2011, she launched a food and recipe YouTube channel. By 2011, she had written over 100 cooking recipes on her blog.

In 2014, she was one of India's top YouTube Chefs. In November 2017, she won the award as the Top YouTube Cooking content creator in the Social Media Summit & Awards 2017.

Nisha has been featured in interviews in Lok Sabha TV and as a face of YouTube's #seesomethingnew drive in 2016. She's also contributor to 'Project Druv' an initiative by Tata Trusts India to bring internet content to villages of India.

In 2016, she was named by The Economic Times among "India's top 10 YouTube superstars". Nisha was featured in Vodafone's 'Women of Pure Wonder' coffee table book in 2016. In 2020, she crossed 10 million subscribers and got YouTube diamond play button.
