= Sanand Mitra =

Indian archer

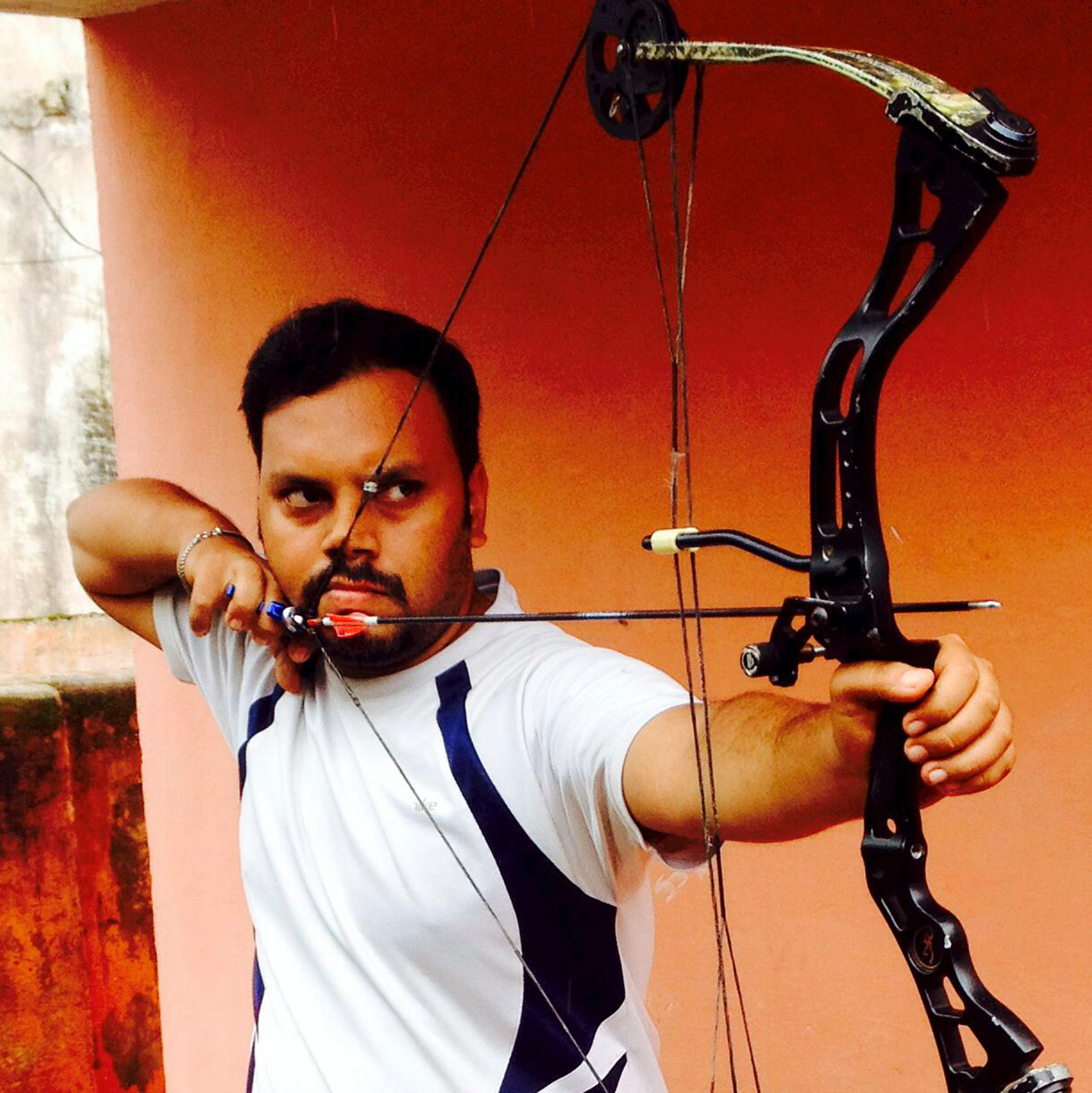
Shooting

Sanand Salil Mitra (born 5 May 1983) is an Indian national compound archer. He was twice awarded a national gold medal in the sport.
