= Prithika Pradeep =

Indian compound archer (born 2008)

Personal information
- Born: 27 September 2008 (age 18) Nagercoil, India

Sport
- Sport: Archery
- Event: Compound

Achievements and titles
- Highest world ranking: 26 (16 February 2026)
- Personal best: 702 (2025)
Medal record
Women's compound archery
Representing India
Asian Games
Gold medal – first place	2026 Aichi–Nagoya	Team
Asian Championships
Gold medal – first place	2025 Dhaka	Team
Silver medal – second place	2025 Dhaka	Individual
World Cup
Silver medal – second place	2025 Madrid	Team
Silver medal – second place	2026 Madrid	Team
Bronze medal – third place	2026 Madrid	Individual
World Youth Championships
Silver medal – second place	2025 Winnipeg	Cadet Mixed team
Silver medal – second place	2025 Winnipeg	Cadet Individual
Asian Youth Championships
Gold medal – first place	2025 Taipei	Individual
Silver medal – second place	2025 Taipei	Team

Prithika Pradeep (born 27 September 2008) is an Indian compound archer. She was part of the Indian women's team that won a gold medal at the 2026 Asian Games. She won the gold medal in the women's cadet individual event at the 2025 World Archery Youth Championships, and has also won medals in the Archery World Cup, Asian Archery Championships, and Asian Youth Championships.

== Career ==
Pradeep made her international debut at the 2024 Asian Youth Archery Championships, where she won gold and silver in the individual and team events respectively. She made her first senior appearance at the 2025 Asia Cup in Bangkok, where she finished sixth in the women's individual event. She made her World Cup debut in the Madrid leg of the 2025 edition, where she won a silver medal in the women's team event.

Pradeep participated in the 2025 World Archery Youth Championships in Winnipeg, where she won silver medals in the cadet (under-18) individual and mixed team events, respectively. She represented the Chero Archers in the first-ever edition of the Archery Premier League held in New Delhi. She won a gold medal in the women's team event and a silver in the individual event after losing to compatriot Jyothi Surekha in the final at the 2025 Asian Archery Championships in Dhaka. She also won four medals in the Sub Junior National Championships in Itanagar, representing the state of Maharashtra.

Pradeep qualified for the 2026 Asian Games and the last two stages of the 2026 Archery World Cup after finishing in the top three of the women's compound individual event during the selection trials. She was part of the Indian women's team that won a gold medal at the 2026 Asian Games.
