= Sultanpur, Karimnagar district =

- Village in India
- Nickname: Sulthanpur
- Location of Sultanpur in Telangana
- Coordinates: 18.53304°N 79.23525°E
- Country: India
- State: Telangana
- Region: Telangana
- District: Karimnagar
- Elevation: 238 m (781 ft)
- Postal code: 505 525

Sultanpur is a Gram panchayat in Karimnagar district in the southern state of Telangana, India. The village is located on the way between Karimnagar and Peddapalli; equal distance from both. Sultanpur is a village in Eligedu mandal.

Sultanpur serves as the postal head for few neighboring villages. Sultanpur has an upper primary school, Zilla Parishad High School.

== Agriculture ==
Sultanpur produces paddy, maize, ground-nut and more commercial crops. Though every land in the village have bore-wells to water the land, most of the crops are watered with the aid of canal from Sriram Sagar Project. Education: Sultanpur has two Anganwadi Centers and a ZP High School. One of them were run by Panjala Sunitha.She took the responsilibility of Anganwadi center located at the entrance of village and worked as Teacher for over 30+ years.

== Transportation ==
Mostly one needs to have personal vehicle or they can take autos.
