= Gora Ho =

Indian archer

Gora Ho is an Indian archer based in Balijhudi village, Rajnagar. He is also known as the Golden Boy.

== Early life ==
Gora, youngest son of Khaireu Ho comes from a poor family of farmers. He lost his mother Chameni in 2016 and was since looked after by his three elder brothers. He began his training at Arjuna Archery Academy and was later moved to Dugni Archery Academy in Seraikela by B Srinivas Rao.

== Career ==
In 2014, at the age of 13, he earned recognition after receiving three gold medals at National School Games in Ranchi and in 2015 he won 10 more medals at Jharkhand Archery Championship.

In 2018, Gora partnered with Akash and Gaurav Lambe and defeated Mongolia to win the gold medal at Asia Cup Stage 1 Archery Meet 2018 in Bangkok.

== Awards ==
In 2015, he received the National Child Award by Pranab Mukherjee. He was awarded with a special bow which costed INR 2.7 lakhs, by the government in 2017. He has won more than 100 medals in sub-junior and junior events in state and national levels.
