= Krishna Das (archer) =

Indian archer

Krishna Das (Bengali: কৃষ্ণা দাস; born 23 May 1959 in Calcutta) is a former Indian archer.

Das represented India in the Asian Games in 1978 in Bangkok and 1982 in Delhi, and in three Asian Archery meets. She was the first archer to receive the Indian Government's Arjuna Award to recognise outstanding sportspersons in 1984. She has received several state level awards and a host of national level awards. She has coached several local level aspiring archers.
