= Sanjeeva Kumar Singh =

Indian archer

Sanjeeva Kumar Singh is an Indian archery coach from Jharkhand. He is chief at Tata Football Academy and Sports, Tata Steel. He is the recipient of Arjuna Award and Dronacharya Award by the Government of India.

== Education and career ==
Sanjeeva received his BE degree in mechanical engineering from Birla Institute of Technology, Mesra, Ranchi and Diploma in Business Management from XLRI, Jamshedpur. Having started off as an amateur archer, Sanjeeva Singh went on to win many a laurels for India at various international sports meets. His list of achievements includes 1 bronze at Asian Championship, 1 Gold and 1 Bronze at Federation Cup International Meet. He has also worked as the coach of the Indian Archery Team. Under his able guidance, the team won 12 Gold and 10 Silver medals at the 2nd South Asian Archery Championship in India. Sanjeeva has been working with Tata Housing Development Company as Vice President - Business Excellence in Mumbai.

== Awards ==
In 1992, Sanjeeva received the Arjuna Award by the Government India for his contribution to Indian Archery. He has also received Dronacharya Award in 2007.
