= Archery Association of India =

Sports governing body in India

- Sport: Archery
- Jurisdiction: India
- Abbreviation: AAI
- Founded: 8 August 1973
- Affiliation: World Archery Federation
- Affiliation date: 1973
- Regional affiliation: World Archery Asia
- Affiliation date: 1978
- Headquarters: Gate No. 2, DDA Yamuna Sports Complex, 1st Floor, Archery & Cricket Stadium, Surajmal Vihar, East Delhi, Delhi – 110092
- Location: East Delhi, Delhi
- President: Arjun Munda
- Secretary: Pramod Chandurkar
- Coach: Dharmendra Tiwari, Richpal Singh, Jiwanjot Singh
- (founded): Vijay Kumar Malhotra

Official website
- www.indianarchery.info
- (India)

Archery Association of India is the national governing body of archery in India. Its headquarters are located in New Delhi, and its current president is Arjun Munda, AAI is a non-profit, government funded organisation affiliated by World Archery Federation, World Archery Asia, Indian Olympic Association and recognized by Ministry of Youth Affairs and Sports of India.

AAI came into existence on 8 August 1973 after archery was reintroduced to the Olympic Games in 1972. It is responsible for organising, promoting, and controlling the sport of archery in India. The organisation runs the Archery Premier League.

== See also ==
- International Archery Federation
- Archery in India
- Archery Premier League
