= Nisha Rani Dutta =

Indian archer

Nisha Rani Dutta (born in Bundu, Ranchi district, Jharkhand) is an Indian archer.

== Career ==
Nisha Rani Dutta started archery at the age of 13. She joined Tata Archery Academy in 2005 and remained there till 2008. She used to earn a monthly stipend of 500 - 600 Rupees there.

In 2007 she won silver in team (senior) event at Asian Championship, Taiwan. In 2008 Nisha won a bronze in team (senior) event at Asian Grand Prix, Bangkok. The same year at South Asian Archery Championship, Jamshedpur she won a silver in individual event.

She went to Bengaluru in 2008 to Mittal Champions Trust and stayed there for a year on contract basis.

In September 2010 Nisha attended the selection trials of South East Central Railway held at Bilaspur, Madhya Pradesh.

After her two sisters got married, she had to take responsibility of her aged parents and could not give archery the required time.

== Personal life ==
Born to a poor family, Nisha Rani Dutta is the daughter of a farmer. Her father didn't have much land and faced difficulty even to buy seeds for farming. In 2012 Dutta sold her silver bow (which she received as a gift from her Korean coach at Mittal Champions Trust) in order to repair her families mud house.
