= Okazaki Central General Park =

Park and sports complex in Japan

- 岡崎中央総合公園
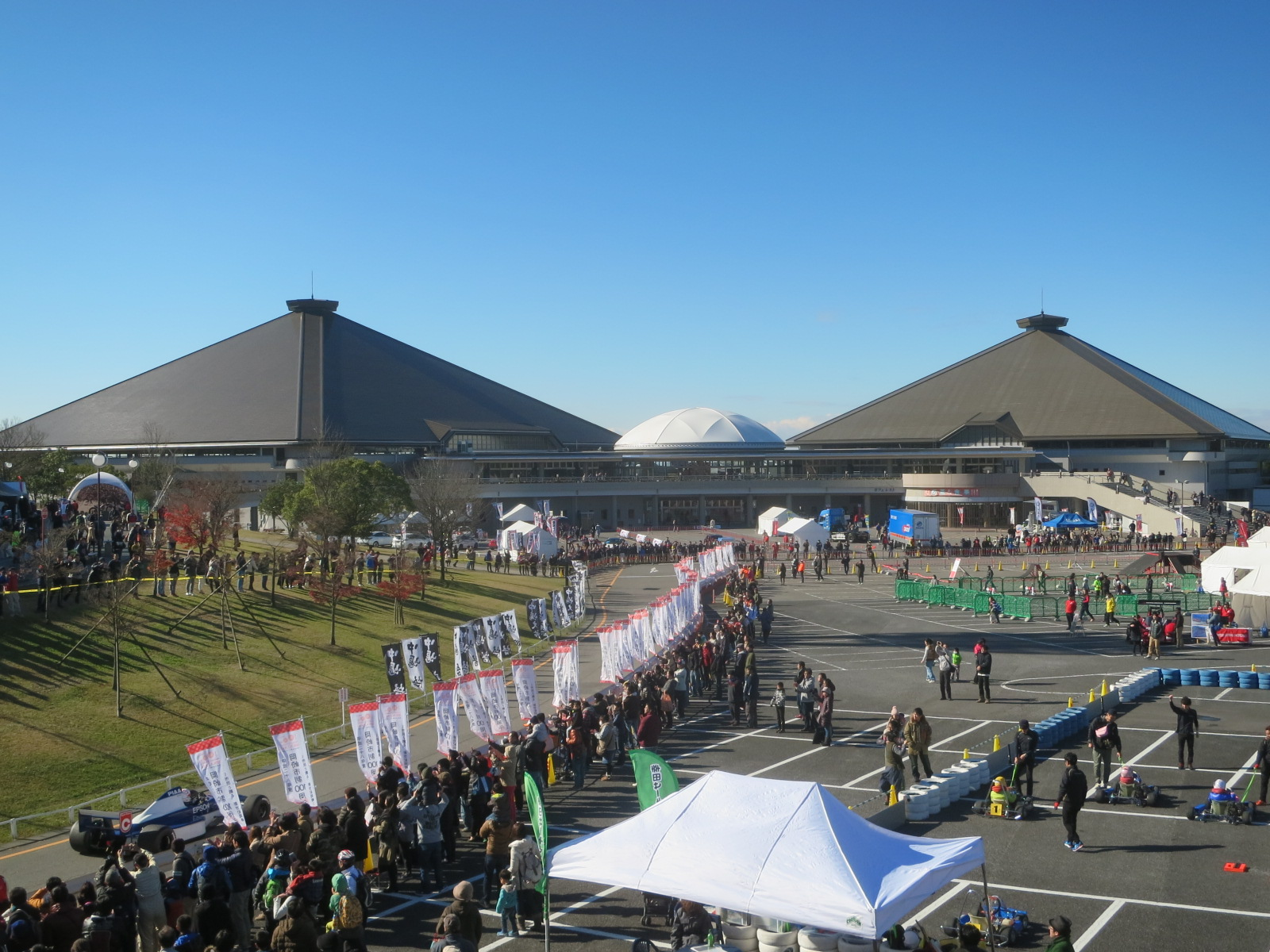
- The Okazaki City Gymnasium and Budokan
- Interactive map of Okazaki Central General Park
- Full name: Okazaki Central General Park
- Location: Okazaki, Aichi, Japan
- Type: Sports complex

Construction
- Opened: 1991
- Expanded: 1991–1996

Website
- okazaki-kanko.jp/chuo-sogo-park

The Okazaki Central General Park (岡崎中央総合公園, Okazaki Chūō Sōgō Kōen) is a park with a sports complex in Okazaki in the Aichi Prefecture, Japan.

== History ==
The Okazaki Central General Park opened on 15 April 1991. Construction of its indoor arena and main baseball stadium had already begun by the previous year. The main baseball stadium opened on 18 May 1991, while the indoor arena followed on 22 May 1993. Additional sports facilities were subsequently completed between 1991 and 1996.

The Okazaki City Mindscape Museum opened on 6 July 1996.

A separate 1,500-seater ball-game field opened on 28 April 2005.

== Facilities ==
The Okazaki Central General Park covers an area of 111.29 hectares (275.0 acres). The area was divided in four zones: sports, culture, family, and nature.

=== Sports ===
==== Built venues ====
Venue	Image	Purpose	Seating capacity	Opened	Notes	Ref.
Baseball Stadium		Stadium	20,000	18 May 1991		
Gymnasium		Indoor arena	2,300 (retractable); 2,620 (fixed)	22 May 1993		
Budokan		Indoor arena / Martial arts hall	1,510			
Ball-game Grounds		Softball/baseball grounds	1,500	28 April 2005		
Tennis Courts		Tennis venue	1,200 (main); 2,350 (secondary courts); N/A (training)	22 May 1993	One main, 16 courts, 2 training courts. All sand-filled artificial	
Archery Range		Archery venue	—	1 May 1996		
Sumo Hall		Sumo venue	—	16 April 1994	121 m^{2} (1,300 sq ft)	

==== Grounds ====
Venue	Area	Notes	Ref.
Multipurpose Plaza	180 m × 100 m (590 ft × 330 ft); 24,000 m^{2} (260,000 sq ft)	Grounds for outdoor sports like football and rugby.	
Sports Plaza	82 m × 119 m (269 ft × 390 ft); 9,726 m^{2} (104,690 sq ft)	Football pitch. Can be used for gateball and softball.	

=== Others ===
Venue	Image	Purpose	Opened	Notes	Ref.
Okazaki City Mindscape Museum		Art museum	6 July 1996		
