= Chikitha Taniparthi =

Indian compound archer (born 2005)

Personal information
- Full name: Chikitha Rao Taniparthi
- Born: 13 August 2005 (age 21) Sultanpur, Telangana, India

Sport
- Sport: Archery
- Event: Compound

Achievements and titles
- Highest world ranking: 35 (16 February 2026)
- Personal best: 701 (2025)
Medal record
Women's compound archery
Representing India
Asian Games
Gold medal – first place	2026 Aichi–Nagoya	Team
Gold medal – first place	2026 Aichi–Nagoya	Mixed team
World Cup
Silver medal – second place	2026 Madrid	Team
Silver medal – second place	2025 Shanghai	Team
Asia Cup
Gold medal – first place	2026 Bangkok	Mixed team
Silver medal – second place	2026 Bangkok	Team
Bronze medal – third place	2025 Bangkok	Team
Indoor World Series
Gold medal – first place	2025 Taipei	U-21 Individual
World Youth Championships
Gold medal – first place	2025 Winnipeg	U-21 Individual

Chikitha Rao Taniparthi (born 13 August 2005) is an Indian compound archer. She is the first Indian woman to win a gold medal in the women's junior individual event at the 2025 World Archery Youth Championships. She is a double-gold medalist at the 2026 Asian Games. She has also won medals in the Archery World Cup, Indoor Archery World Series, and Archery Asia Cup.

== Early life ==
Chikitha Taniparthi was born on 13 August 2005. She hails from an agricultural family in Sultanpur in Peddapalli district, Telangana. Her father, Srinivas Rao, mortgaged his farmland to get her a compound bow to enable her to take part in archery events. In 2021, her father reached out to archer Abhishek Verma, who invited her for trials at New Delhi, and she was later admitted to the National Centre of Excellence run by the Sports Authority of India at Sonipat.

== Career ==
Taniparthi won her first major domestic title at the 2023 National Games of India, where she secured gold in the women's individual event, representing Telangana. In the 2025 Archery World Cup, the Indian women's team consisting of Taniparthi, Jyothi Surekha and Madhura Dhamangaonkar, won the silver medal in the women's team event. In August 2025, she won the gold medal in the women's junior compound individual event at the 2025 World Archery Youth Championships in Winnipeg, thereby becoming the first Indian woman to win a gold medal in the women's individual event at the World Youth Championships.

Taniparthi and Rajat Chauhan won the gold medal in the mixed team event in the 2026 Asia Cup at Bangkok. In May 2026, she qualified for the 2026 Asian Games after finishing in the top three of the women's compound individual event during the national selection trials. At the 2026 Asian Games, she won gold medals in the women's and mixed team compound events, and secured quota places for the 2028 Summer Olympics.
