= Muskan Kirar =

Indian archer

Personal information
- Nationality: Indian
- Citizenship: India
- Born: Jabalpur
- Education: Sr. Secondary
- Occupation: Sports
- Years active: 2016 – present
- Parents: Virendra Kirar (father); Mala Kirar (mother)
- Other interests: Archery

Sport
- Country: India
- Sport: Archery
- Rank: 160
- Team: Archery Association of India
- Coached by: Richpal Singh Salaria
Medal record
Women's compound archery
Representing India
Asian Championships
Silver medal – second place	2019 Bangkok	Team

Muskan Kirar (born 2001) is an Indian archer. She won the gold medal in the women's compound final event at the Archery Asia Cup, stage-1 competition in Bangkok on 7 March 2018. She beat Malaysian archer Sazatul Nadhirah Zakaria by 139–136. Muskan was trained by Richpal Singh Salaria at the Madhya Pradesh Archery Academy in Bhopal.

== Early life ==
Muskan was raised in Jabalpur, Madhya Pradesh. She is the daughter of Mala Kirar, a homemaker, and Virendra Kirar, who is a business man.

== Career ==
=== Archery Asia Cup ===
Kirar's first match of the tournament saw her amass 142 points against an opponent from Taipei, before winning her next match with a score of 145 points. She won her quarter-final match against an Indonesian opponent, scoring 147 points, before beating a Malaysian competitor in the semi-finals with a score of 148. Kirar's gold medal came thanks to a win of 139–136 in her final match against Malaysian Zakaria Nadhirah.

== Competitions ==
Representing India
Year	Competition	Venue	Event	Medal
2018	Archery Asia Cup Competition, Stage-1	Bangkok	Women's Compound	Gold
2017	37th Sub Junior, National Archery Competition	Bhubaneswar, India	Sub Junior	Gold
2017	Asia Cup Stage-3	Taipei, Taiwan	Senior	
2017	Senior Asian Championship	Dhaka	Senior	
