= Yamuna Sports Complex =

Sports complex in New Delhi, India

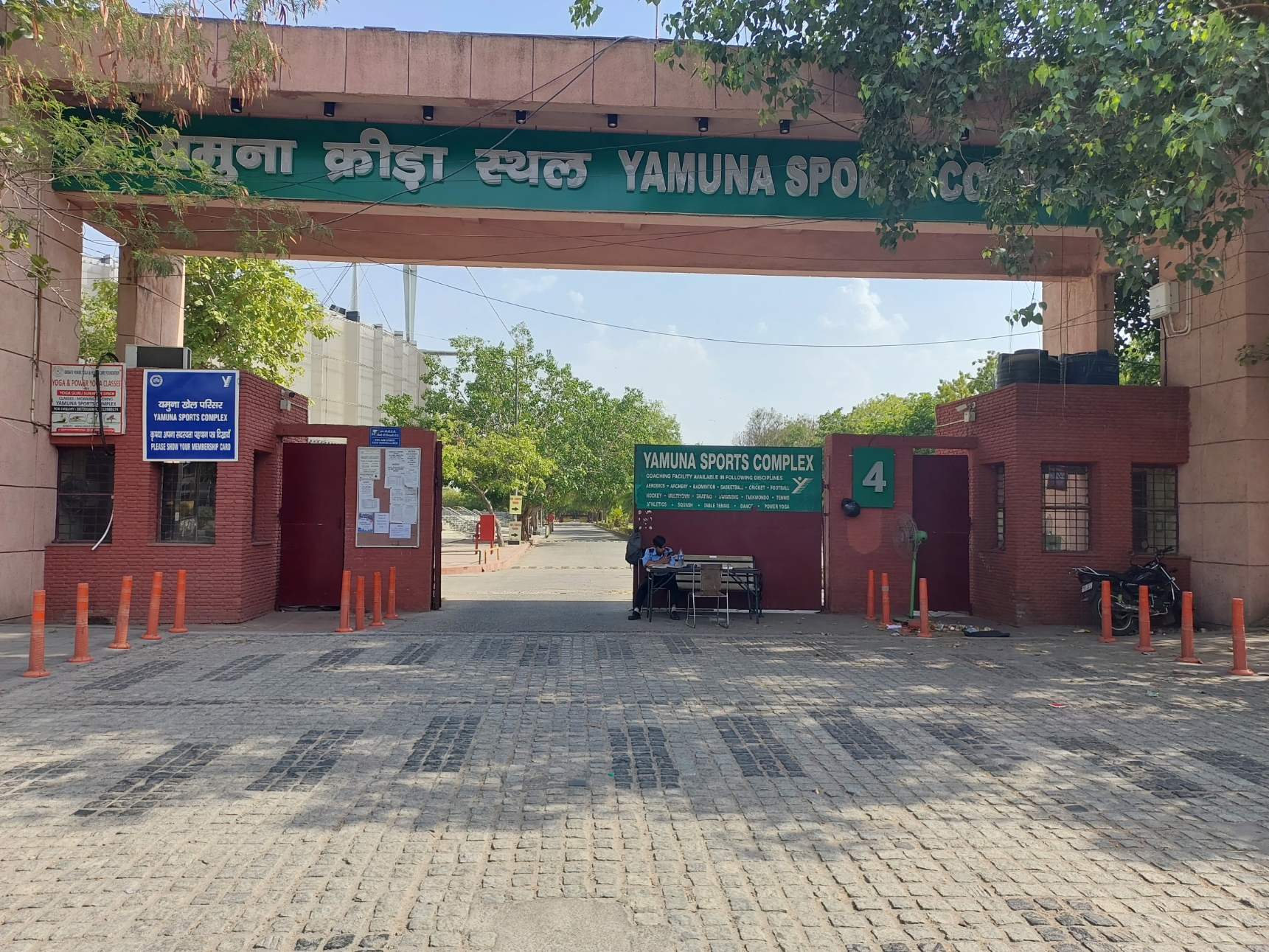
- Interactive map of Yamuna Sports Complex
- Location: (India) East Delhi
- Owner: Delhi Development Authority

The Yamuna Sports Complex is a sports complex located in Surajmal Vihar, East Delhi, India. Inaugurated in 1999, it has a wide spectrum of sporting facilities. It is owned by the Delhi Development Authority. It was one of the multiple venues for the 2010 Commonwealth Games

== Overview ==
The table tennis venue has a capacity of 4,297. It features two show court tables, eight match tables, and 10 warm-up tables. The total area of the plot is 26,0000 square meters. The basement area is 26,000 square meters, and the total plinth area is 43,765 square meters. It has wooden flooring in match courts and show courts. It has car parking facilities for 504 cars. The archery venue has a capacity of 1,500. The total area of the plot is 40,000 square metres. It has car parking facilities for 500 cars. It is located near the posh locality of Yojana Vihar, near Vivek Vihar and Shahdara localities. The nearest metro station to the sports complex is Karkardooma Metro station with a distance of about 2 km. Yamuna Sports Complex has state-of-the-art Gymnasium facilities, clay & synthetic tennis courts, and a cricket ground. It also features an artificial turf hockey ground facility. A large stone sculpture, "Aiming For Excellence" by noted sculptor Amarnath Sehgal, was installed at the complex in January 2002. It was the venue for Archery at the 2010 Commonwealth Games as well as Lawn bowls at the 2010 Commonwealth Games

== See also ==
- 2010 Commonwealth Games
- Jawaharlal Nehru Stadium, Delhi
