= Purnima Mahato =

Indian archer and coach

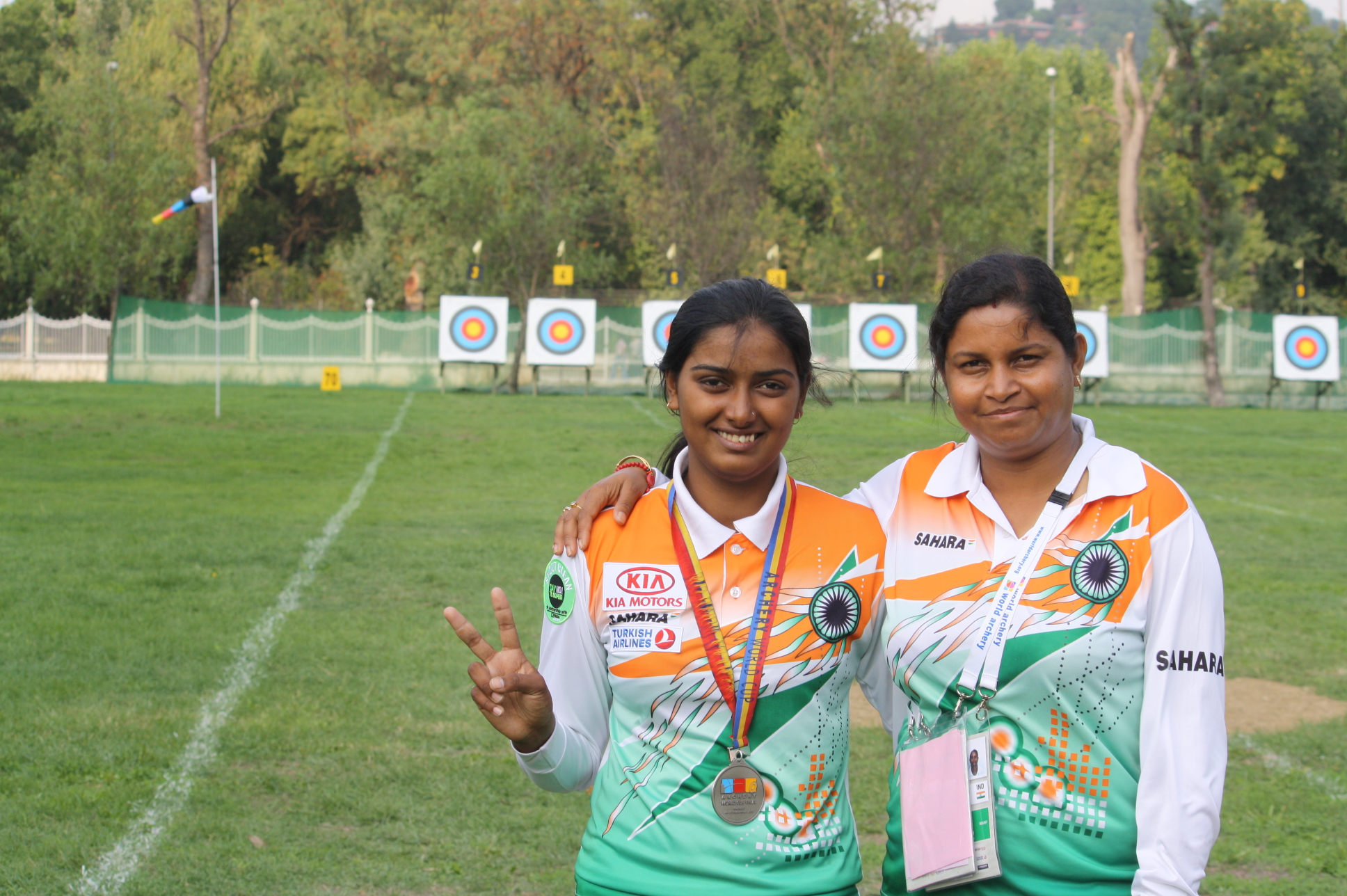
- Mahato (in right) with Deepika Kumari at the World Cup final in Istanbul

Personal information
- Nationality: Indian
- Born: Jamshedpur

Sport
- Country: India
- Sport: Archery
- Club: Tata Archery Academy
- Team: Indian Archery Team Coach
- Turned pro: 1993

Achievements and titles
- Highest world ranking: National Champions
Medal record
Women's archery
Representing India

Purnima Mahato is an Indian archer and archery coach from Jamshedpur, India. She has won the Indian national archery championships. She was a coach for the Indian national team at the 2008 Summer Olympics and was selected to coach the team at the 2012 Summer Olympics. She was awarded Dronacharya award from President of India for 2013 on 29 August 2013. She was conferred with the Padma Shri 2024, India's fourth highest civilian award, for her work in the field of Sports.

== Career ==
As a child, Mahato watched archery at a range in Birsanagar, Jamshedpur. She trained there before moving to a range at Burmamines, Jamshedpur when the one in Birsanagar closed. She made it to the Indian national team in 1992, and moved to Delhi to train with the team.

As an archer, Mahato earned medals in both national and international archery competitions. She was also an Indian national champion. At the 1993 International Archery Championship, she earned a gold medal in the team event. At the 1994 Pune National Games, she won six gold medals in archery. She competed at the 1994 Asian Games but did not medal. In 1997 at the National Championships, she earned two gold medals and set two national records. At the 1999 Indian National Games, Dola Banerjee broke a national record Mahato had set two years earlier in the 30 metre archery event.

=== Coaching ===
Mahato is an archery coach. Starting in 1994, she coached at the Tata Archery Academy, a position she had held as of 2012. Archers she has personally coached include 2012 Summer Olympian Deepika Kumari.

Mahato has been a coach for Indian national teams at several events including the 2005 Senior World Outdoor Archery Championship at Spain, where her team earned a silver medal. She also coached the Indian side at the 2007 Senior Asian Archery Championship in China, where the men's team she coached finished first and the women's team she coached finished third. She was an assistant coach for India at the 2008 Summer Olympics. She also coached the Indian side at the 2008 World Cup in Croatia, where her archers earned a silver medal and a bronze medal at the event. She coached India at the 2009 World Youth Archery Championship. She coached the three Indian archers at the 2010 Archery World Cup Grand. She coached the Indian national team at the 2010 Asian Games, where her archers earned two bronze medals in the individual events. She coached the Indian national team at the 2010 Commonwealth games, with her archers earning three gold and two bronze medals. At the Global Sports Summit TURF 2011, she was named the coach of the year. She got Ram Dayal Munda Award for BestCoach of the year from Government of Jharkhand on Olympic Day Run celebrations, 23 June 2012 at Ranchi.

Mahato was selected to represent India at the 2012 Summer Olympics as the national team's coach. Mahato represented India at 2016 Summer Olympics as the national team's coach.

Mahato was selected to represent India at 2024 Summer Olympics as coach of India Archery Team.

== Awards ==
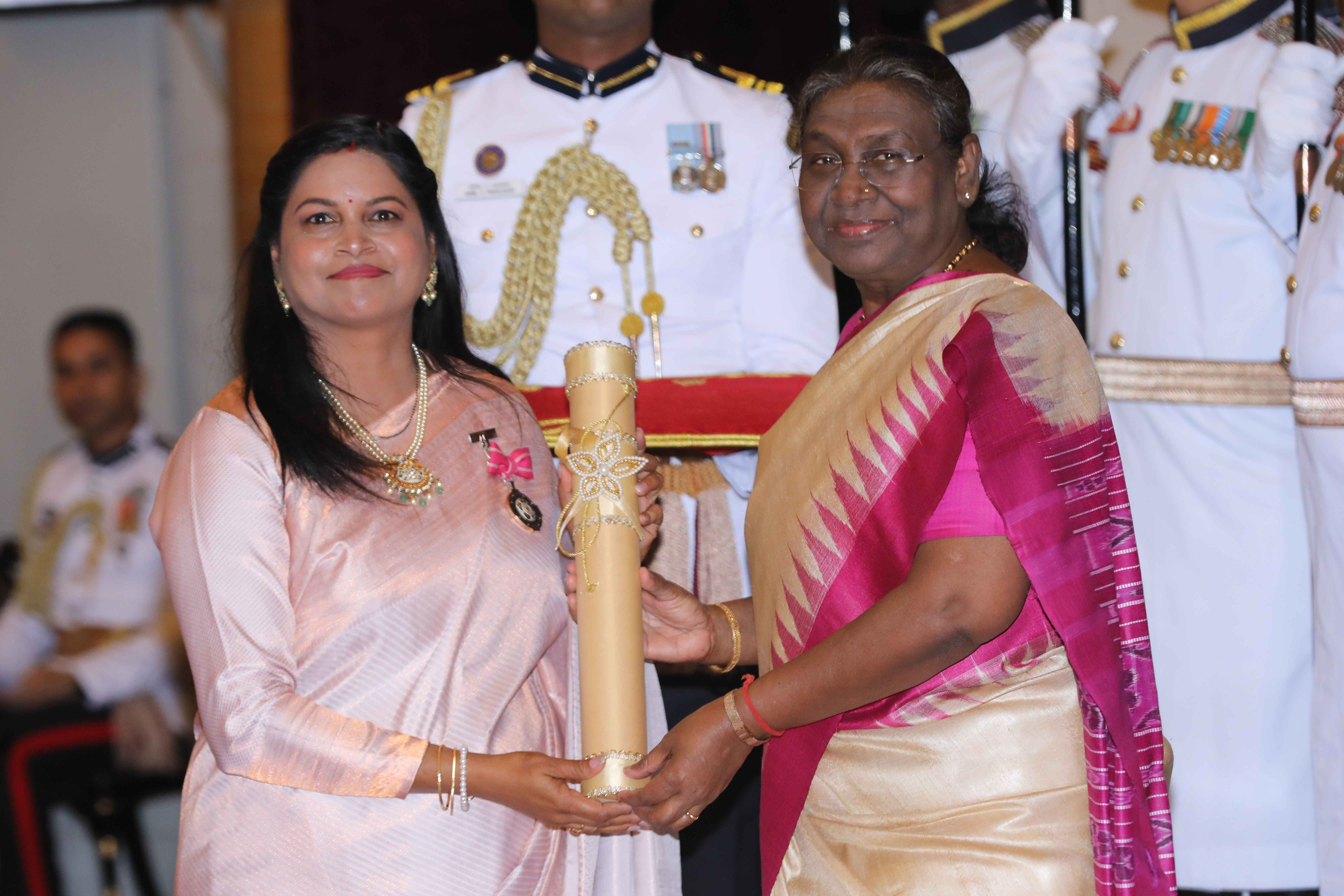
Purnima Mahato is receiving Padma Shri Award from President

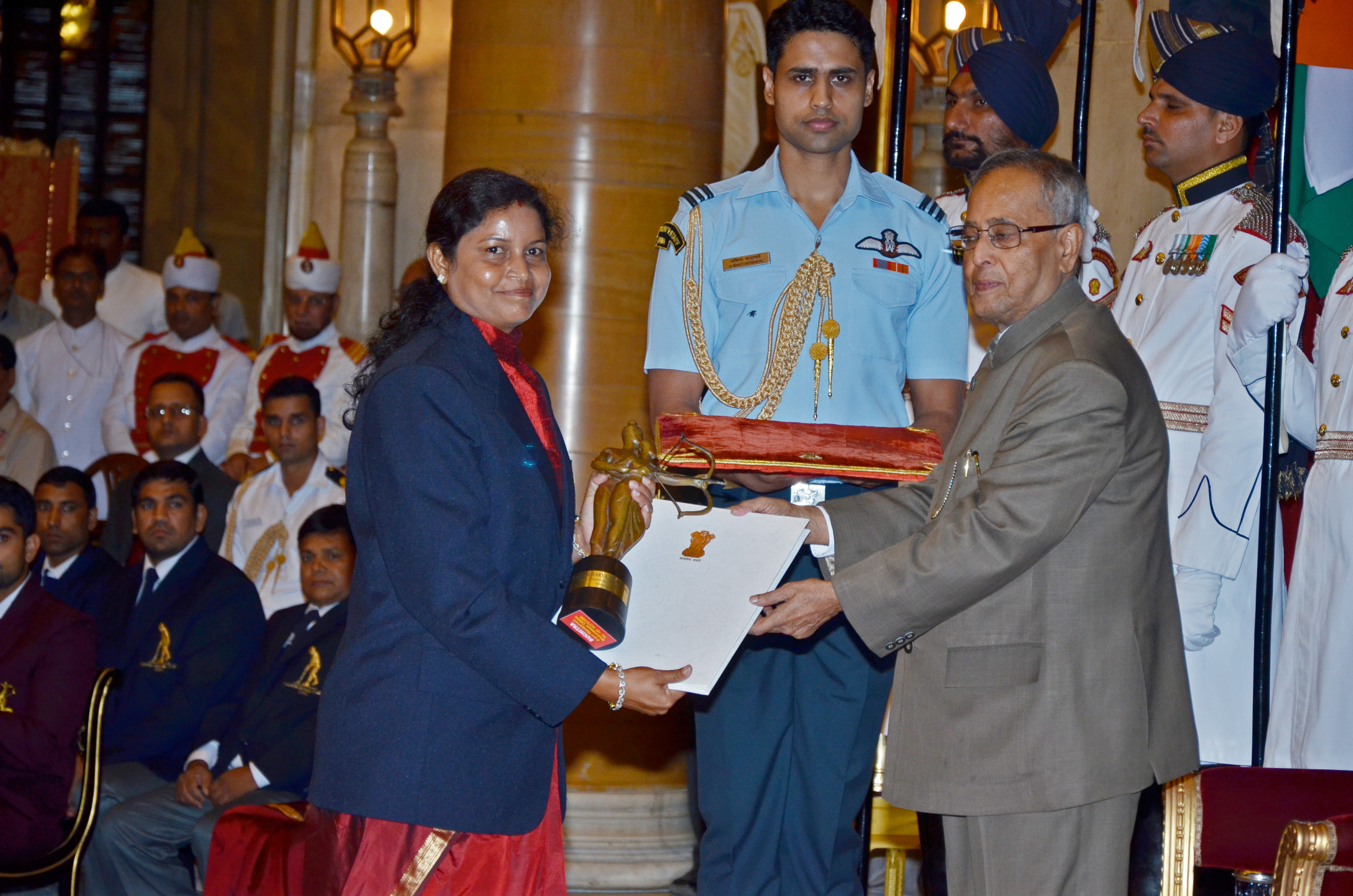
Purnima Mahato is receiving Donacharya Award from President

Purnima Mahato was awarded Padma Shri from President of India for 2024 on 22 April 2024. Purnima Mahato was awarded Dronacharya award from President of India for 2013 on 29 August 2013. Purnima Mahato is the first woman of Jharkhand awarded with Prestigious Dronacharya Award .

President Draupadi Murmu honoured Jharkhand's Purnima Mahato, Padma Shri award in New Delhi.
