= Archery at the 2023 European Games – Men's individual recurve =

Archery event

Men's individual recurve at the 2023 European Games
- Venue: Plaszowianka Archery Park
- Date: 23–29 June
- Competitors: 47 from 31 nations

Medalists
gold medal	Florian Unruh	Germany
silver medal	Miguel Alvariño	Spain
bronze medal	Pablo Acha	Spain

The men's individual recurve competition at the 2023 European Games was held from 23 to 29 June 2023 at the Plaszowianka Archery Park in Kraków, Poland.

== Records ==
Prior to the competition, the existing world, European and Games records were as follows:

- 72 arrow ranking round

World record	Brady Ellison (USA)	702	Lima, Peru	7 August 2019
European record	Mete Gazoz (TUR)	698	Bucharest, Romania	9 April 2019
Games record	Mete Gazoz (TUR)	685	Minsk, Belarus	21 June 2019

== Ranking round ==
The ranking round took place on 23 June 2023 to determine the seeding for the knockout rounds. It consisted of two rounds of 36 arrows, with a maximum score of 720.

Rank	Archer	Nation	Score	10s	Xs
1	Mete Gazoz	Turkey	692 GR	47	19
2	Florian Unruh	Germany	686	41	16
3	Monty Orton	Great Britain	683	39	16
4	Baptiste Addis	France	683	39	13
5	Senna Roos	Netherlands	680	38	12
6	Jean-Charles Valladont	France	679	37	16
7	Steve Wijler	Netherlands	678	39	15
8	Miguel Alvariño	Spain	676	40	13
9	Ivan Kozhokar	Ukraine	676	39	12
10	Alessandro Paoli	Italy	676	35	14
11	Gijs Broeksma	Netherlands	675	36	10
12	Andrés Temiño	Spain	674	35	10
13	Jarno De Smedt	Belgium	673	35	13
14	Pablo Acha	Spain	673	32	10
15	Mauro Nespoli	Italy	673	31	9
16	Federico Musolesi	Italy	671	36	9
17	Keziah Chabin	Switzerland	665	27	9
18	Oleksii Hunbin	Ukraine	664	32	13
19	Alex Wise	Great Britain	663	28	12
20	Nicolas Bernardi	France	662	27	8
21	Dan Olaru	Moldova	659	29	9
22	Florian Faber	Switzerland	659	26	13
23	Den Habjan Malavašič	Slovenia	658	25	9
24	Lovro Černi	Croatia	658	24	4
25	Artem Ovchynnikov	Ukraine	657	28	11
26	Kacper Sierakowski	Poland	657	26	8
27	Antti Tekoniemi	Finland	657	23	6
28	Jeff Henckels	Luxembourg	655	26	8
29	Adam Li	Czech Republic	655	24	8
30	James Woodgate	Great Britain	654	21	6
31	Kaj Sjöberg	Sweden	653	26	9
32	Roy Dror	Israel	648	22	5
33	Oskar Kasprowski	Poland	648	21	4
34	Thomas Rufer	Switzerland	647	21	5
35	Oliver Staudt	Denmark	647	19	7
36	Mario Timpu	Romania	646	18	7
37	Mátyás Balogh	Hungary	641	23	10
38	Ivan Banchev	Bulgaria	640	14	5
39	Charalampos Charalampous	Cyprus	638	18	4
40	Sławomir Napłoszek	Poland	636	21	7
41	Miroslav Duchoň	Slovakia	634	21	7
42	Edi Dvorani	Kosovo	633	18	4
43	Dāvis Blāze	Latvia	626	14	4
44	Andreas Gstöttner	Austria	625	21	9
45	Nuno Carneiro	Portugal	622	16	5
46	Panagiotis Katsaitis	Greece	622	14	6
47	Oskar Ronan	Ireland	601	12	5

== Elimination rounds ==
=== Section 1 ===
1/32 finals
33	Kasprowski (POL)	6	25	28	28	28	28
32	Dror (ISR)	4	28	23	29	27	27
41	Duchoň (SVK)	6	27	25	27	28
24	Černi (CRO)	2	26	24	28	23
25	Ovchynnikov (UKR)	6	28	26	29	27	29
40	Napłoszek (POL)	4	26	29	27	29	25

1/16 finals
1	Gazoz (TUR)	6	29	28	29
33	Kasprowski (POL)	0	25	26	27
17	Chabin (SUI)	7	27	28	26	24	29
16	Musolesi (ITA)	3	27	27	25	28	28
9	Kozhokar (UKR)	0	26	25	26
41	Duchoň (SVK)	6	29	28	27
25	Ovchynnikov (UKR)	4	29	28	28	28	28
8	Alvariño (ESP)	6	29	28	28	30	28

1/8 finals
1	Gazoz (TUR)	6^{10}	30	29	27	27	26
17	Chabin (SUI)	5^{9}	27	29	26	28	27
41	Duchoň (SVK)	5^{8}	29	26	23	25	27
8	Alvariño (ESP)	6^{10}	29	23	24	26	26

Quarterfinals
1	Gazoz (TUR)	4	29	28	27	29	28
8	Alvariño (ESP)	6	28	30	26	30	30

=== Section 2 ===
1/32 finals
37	Balogh (HUN)	7	28	25	28	27	28
28	Henckels (LUX)	3	28	24	26	28	25
21	Olaru (MDA)	7	25	27	28	28
44	Gstöttner (AUT)	1	23	27	25	21
45	Carneiro (POR)	2	25	26	28	27
20	Bernardi (FRA)	6	28	29	25	30
29	Li (CZE)	6^{9}	27	25	27	26	27
36	Timpu (ROU)	5^{8}	27	29	29	25	23

1/16 finals
5	Roos (NED)	6	30	27	29	30
37	Balogh (HUN)	2	25	28	23	26
21	Olaru (MDA)	6	29	28	28	29
12	Temiño (ESP)	2	28	29	26	28
13	De Smedt (BEL)	3	25	28	25	26	27
20	Bernardi (FRA)	7	27	27	26	26	30
29	Li (CZE)	0	27	28	24
4	Addis (FRA)	6	28	29	28

1/8 finals
5	Roos (NED)	5^{8}	29	26	27	29	27
21	Olaru (MDA)	6^{9}	29	27	26	28	28
20	Bernardi (FRA)	4	26	28	29	28	26
4	Addis (FRA)	6	29	28	27	28	27

Quarterfinals
21	Olaru (MDA)	6	27	26	28	25	28
4	Addis (FRA)	4	26	28	27	28	27

=== Section 3 ===
1/32 finals
35	Staudt (DEN)	6	26	28	25	28
30	Woodgate (GBR)	2	25	25	29	26
19	Wise (GBR)	7	25	26	29	27	27
46	Katsaitis (GRE)	3	25	27	26	25	24
43	Blāze (LAT)	5^{9}	23	26	28	26	25
22	Faber (SUI)	6^{9+}	25	24	28	25	27
27	Tekoniemi (FIN)	7	26	26	28	27	26
38	Banchev (BUL)	3	26	27	25	25	25

1/16 finals
3	Orton (GBR)	6	27	26	28	28
35	Staudt (DEN)	2	27	26	27	27
19	Wise (GBR)	2	26	24	27	25
14	Acha (ESP)	6	26	26	27	28
11	Broeksma (NED)	7	29	25	29	30
22	Faber (SUI)	1	28	25	24	28
27	Tekoniemi (FIN)	4	28	28	29	29	27
6	Valladont (FRA)	6	28	28	28	29	29

1/8 finals
3	Orton (GBR)	2	27	25	29	27
14	Acha (ESP)	6	28	28	27	28
11	Broeksma (NED)	4	27	28	28	25	26
6	Valladont (FRA)	6	29	27	26	27	27

Quarterfinals
14	Acha (ESP)	6	27	29	28	27	27
6	Valladont (FRA)	4	29	28	27	28	26

=== Section 4 ===
1/32 finals
39	Charalampous (CYP)	5^{9}	27	29	27	25	26
26	Sierakowski (POL)	6^{9+}	27	18	24	27	27
23	Habjan Malavašič (SLO)	6	28	29	28
42	Dvorani (KOS)	0	20	19	22
47	Ronan (IRL)	3	23	25	27	27	24
18	Hunbin (UKR)	7	28	28	27	26	29
31	Sjöberg (SWE)	3	26	27	26	27	28
34	Rufer (SUI)	7	27	26	29	27	29

1/16 finals
7	Wijler (NED)	6	26	28	29	29	27
26	Sierakowski (POL)	4	27	27	29	26	27
23	Habjan Malavašič (SLO)	4	29	25	29	27	26
10	Paoli (ITA)	6	27	27	27	29	29
15	Nespoli (ITA)	6	28	30	28	27
18	Hunbin (UKR)	2	28	27	25	27
34	Rufer (SUI)	3	27	26	28	30	27
2	Unruh (GER)	7	29	26	30	29	28

1/8 finals
7	Wijler (NED)	6	28	28	28	28	28
10	Paoli (ITA)	4	27	28	28	29	27
15	Nespoli (ITA)	2	25	29	27	28
2	Unruh (GER)	6	28	26	28	29

Quarterfinals
7	Wijler (NED)	5^{8}	30	27	27	28	29
2	Unruh (GER)	6^{10}	27	29	28	28	28

=== Finals ===
Semifinals
8	Miguel Alvariño (ESP)	6	27	30	28	28	30
21	Dan Olaru (MDA)	4	28	28	26	29	27
14	Pablo Acha (ESP)	1	25	27	26	25
2	Florian Unruh (GER)	7	29	27	27	28

Gold medal match
8	Miguel Alvariño (ESP)	2	28	25	27	27
2	Florian Unruh (GER)	6	28	29	28	27
Bronze medal match
21	Dan Olaru (MDA)	1	26	27	29	25
14	Pablo Acha (ESP)	7	29	28	29	29
