= 2021 Archery Final Olympic Qualification Tournament =

- Venue: Charléty Stadium
- Location: Paris, France
- Dates: 18–21 June 2021

The 2021 Archery Final Olympic Qualification Tournament (FQT) was the final qualifying tournament for archers to qualify to the 2020 Summer Olympics at Tokyo, Japan. The tournament was held at the Charlety Stadium in Paris, France from 18 to 21 June. Paris also hosted the 2021 Archery World Cup Stage 3 from 21 to 28 June after this tournament.

The tournament only consisted of recurve events (no compound events) as used in the 2020 Summer Olympics- men and women's individual, and the men and women's team. The two highest National Olympic Committees (NOCs) in the men's individual together with the highest NOC in the women's individual earned a spot to the Olympics; the 3 top teams in both team events also earned a spot to the Olympics and also earned each NOC on that team a place in the individual events. Due to the Oceania Continental Qualification Tournament being canceled because of the ongoing COVID-19 pandemic, the highest placing Oceanian NOC in both individual events qualified.

== Participating nations ==
250 athletes from 68 countries participated in the tournament.

- Argentina (2)
- Australia (2)
- Austria (6)
- Azerbaijan (6)
- Bangladesh (6)
- Belarus (3)
- Belgium (3)
- Bolivia (1)
- Brazil (6)
- Bulgaria (2)
- Canada (3)
- Colombia (6)
- Croatia (3)
- Czech Republic (6)
- Denmark (3)
- Egypt (3)
- El Salvador (1)
- Estonia (5)
- Finland (6)
- France (6)
- Georgia (6)
- Germany (3)
- Greece (2)
- Guatemala (2)
- Guyana (1)
- Hong Kong (3)
- Hungary (1)
- Iceland (3)
- India (3)
- Indonesia (6)
- Iran (6)
- Ireland (3)
- Israel (2)
- Italy (6)
- Ivory Coast (4)
- Kazakhstan (3)
- Kosovo (2)
- Kyrgyzstan (4)
- Latvia (4)
- Lithuania (3)
- Luxembourg (2)
- Malawi (1)
- Malaysia (6)
- Mexico (6)
- Moldova (1)
- Mongolia (4)
- Philippines (4)
- Poland (6)
- Portugal (3)
- Puerto Rico (1)
- Romania (3)
- Russia (3)
- San Marino (2)
- Slovakia (6)
- Slovenia (6)
- Spain (6)
- Sri Lanka (3)
- Sudan (1)
- Sweden (6)
- Switzerland (6)
- Tajikistan (1)
- Thailand (3)
- Turkey (6)
- Ukraine (3)
- United States (6)
- United States Virgin Islands (2)
- Uzbekistan (6)
- Yemen (1)

== Qualification summary ==
This list shows a summary of the athletes and teams that qualified to the Olympics through this tournament.

NOC	Men		Women		Total
NOC	Men's Individual	Men's Team	Women's Individual	Women's Team	Total
Czech Republic			1		1
Finland	1				1
France		Yes			3
Greece			1		1
Hungary	1				1
Italy				Yes	3
Indonesia		Yes			3
Israel	1				1
Mexico				Yes	3
Mongolia			1		1
Moldova	1				1
Poland	1		1		2
ROC	1				1
Romania			1		1
Ukraine	1				1
United States		Yes		Yes	6
Total: 16 NOCs	7	3	5	3	30

== Summary ==
Event	First	Second	Third
Men's individual details	Galsan Bazarzhapov; Russia	Dan Olaru; Moldova	Antti Vikström; Finland
Women's individual details	Mădălina Amaistroaie; Romania	Sylwia Zyzańska; Poland	Marie Horáčková; Czech Republic
Men's team details	United States (USA); Brady Ellison; Jack Williams; Jacob Wukie	Indonesia (INA); Arif Dwi Pangestu; Alviyanto Prastyadi; Riau Ega Agatha	France (FRA); Thomas Chirault; Pierre Plihon; Jean-Charles Valladont
Women's team details	Mexico (MEX); Aída Román; Alejandra Valencia; Ana Paula Vázquez	United States (USA); Mackenzie Brown; Casey Kaufhold; Jennifer Mucino-Fernandez	Italy (ITA); Tatiana Andreoli; Lucilla Boari; Chiara Rebagliati

== Men's individual ==
=== Qualification ===
Men's Qualification
Rank	Archers	Nation	Total	10s	Xs
–	Mete Gazoz	Turkey	698	51	17
–	Brady Ellison	United States	689	44	19
–	Mauro Nespoli	Italy	684	39	14
1	Jeff Henckels	Luxembourg	682	36	15
–	Thomas Chirault	France	681	36	13
–	Florian Unruh	Germany	678	35	8
–	Maximilian Weckmüller	Germany	678	34	12
2	Galsan Bazarzhapov	Russia	675	36	14
3	Florian Faber	Switzerland	674	38	13
–	Jack Williams	United States	674	36	13
–	Brian Maxwell	Canada	674	33	13
4	Beligto Tsynguev	Russia	674	31	11
–	Riau Ega Agatha	Indonesia	674	31	10
–	Muhamad Zarif Syahiir Zolkepeli	Malaysia	674	31	5
5	Aldar Tsybikzhapov	Russia	672	35	11
–	Pierre Plihon	France	672	33	10
–	Moritz Wieser	Germany	672	32	9
6	Robert Nam	Tajikistan	671	32	8
–	Alessandro Paoli	Italy	671	29	11
–	Crispin Duenas	Canada	670	33	10
–	Jean-Charles Valladont	France	669	33	15
7	Alen Remar	Croatia	669	33	8
8	Jarno De Smedt	Belgium	669	32	11
–	Jacob Wukie	United States	668	35	9
–	Md Ruman Shana	Bangladesh	668	32	9
–	Federico Musolesi	Italy	668	29	11
–	Arif Dwi Pangestu	Indonesia	667	35	10
–	Miguel Alvariño	Spain	667	31	11
9	Nicholas D'Amour	United States Virgin Islands	667	31	6
10	Senna Roos	Belgium	667	28	10
11	Aliaksandr Liahusheu	Belarus	666	31	7
–	Baatarkhuyagiin Otgonbold	Mongolia	666	28	11
–	Luis Álvarez	Mexico	665	28	13
–	Khairul Anuar Mohamad	Malaysia	665	26	10
12	Oleksii Hunbin	Ukraine	665	26	7
13	Heorhiy Ivanytskyy	Ukraine	663	33	5
–	Marcus D'Almeida	Brazil	663	29	7
–	Den Habjan Malavašič	Slovenia	663	28	11
–	Bernardo Oliveira	Brazil	663	28	10
14	Óscar Ticas	El Salvador	663	26	5
–	Ángel Alvarado	Mexico	662	33	10
–	Žiga Ravnikar	Slovenia	662	33	9
15	Antti Tekoniemi	Finland	662	26	7
–	Jantsangiin Gantögs	Mongolia	661	27	8
–	Pablo Acha	Spain	661	24	11
16	Matija Mihalić	Croatia	661	23	10
17	Adrián Muñoz	Puerto Rico	661	23	6
18	Andreas Gstöttner	Austria	660	30	8
19	Antti Vikström	Finland	660	27	10
–	Abdur Rahman Alif	Bangladesh	659	31	12
–	Muhammad Akmal Nor Hasrin	Malaysia	659	29	10
–	Dorjsürengiin Dashnamjil	Mongolia	659	26	9
–	Youssof Tolba	Egypt	659	24	7
–	Mohammad Hakim Ahmed Rubel	Bangladesh	658	29	2
–	Daniel Castro	Spain	658	26	11
–	Alviyanto Bagas Prastyadi	Indonesia	658	25	5
20	Nuno Carneiro	Portugal	658	24	11
21	Anton Prilepov	Belarus	657	29	9
22	Mátyás László Balogh	Hungary	657	24	8
23	Itay Shanny	Israel	656	27	7
–	Samet Ak	Turkey	656	26	8
–	Reza Shabani	Iran	655	31	9
24	Mario Țîmpu	Romania	655	28	11
–	Marcelo Costa	Brazil	654	24	6
–	Eric Peters	Canada	653	25	11
25	Kacper Sierakowski	Poland	653	24	7
26	Michal Hlahůlek	Czech Republic	653	23	7
–	Carlos Rojas	Mexico	653	20	7
27	Ravien Dalpatadu	Sri Lanka	651	23	9
28	Zokirjon Gafurov	Uzbekistan	651	20	5
29	Lasha Pkhakadze	Georgia	650	27	4
30	Sajeev De Silva	Sri Lanka	650	22	6
31	Ivan Kozhokar	Ukraine	650	22	6
32	Tiago Matos	Portugal	650	22	4
33	Dan Olaru	Moldova	649	26	6
34	Miroslav Duchoň	Slovakia	647	26	10
35	Jasson Emmanuel Feliciano	Philippines	647	24	11
36	Samuli Piippo	Finland	646	22	6
37	Thomas Rufer	Switzerland	646	21	8
38	Mario Damián Jajarabilla	Argentina	646	21	6
–	Santiago Arcila	Colombia	646	21	5
–	Milad Vaziri Teymoorlooei	Iran	646	20	8
39	Thomas Flossbach	Guatemala	644	17	6
–	Gašper Štrajhar	Slovenia	643	26	12
40	Sławomir Napłoszek	Poland	643	26	6
41	Mahammadali Aliyev	Azerbaijan	643	21	10
42	Jānis Bružis	Latvia	642	23	10
43	Pit Klein	Luxembourg	642	18	4
44	Juraj Duchoň	Slovakia	641	21	8
45	Jaromír Termer	Czech Republic	639	22	6
–	Daniel Pineda	Colombia	637	20	7
–	Sadegh Ashrafi	Iran	637	20	6
46	Kaj Sjöberg	Sweden	637	17	5
47	Ben Adriaensen	Belgium	635	21	6
48	Shokhjakhon Abdulkhamidov	Uzbekistan	635	15	3
49	Lovro Černi	Croatia	634	22	7
50	Witthaya Thamwong	Thailand	634	19	5
51	Cheung Sum Hin Moses	Hong Kong	634	18	5
–	Jorge Enríquez	Colombia	634	16	5
52	Wan Chun Kit	Hong Kong	631	20	8
53	Marek Szafran	Poland	631	18	4
54	Luis Gonçalves	Portugal	629	20	8
55	Julian Schweighofer	Austria	629	20	7
56	Ivan Banchev	Bulgaria	629	18	10
57	Jaba Moseshvili	Georgia	629	16	5
58	Anton Tsiareta	Belarus	628	14	6
59	Denchai Thepna	Thailand	628	10	4
60	Jonathan Andersson	Sweden	627	17	8
61	Riley Silos	Philippines	627	16	7
–	Sherif Mohamed	Egypt	626	15	5
–	Ali Aydın	Turkey	625	17	7
62	Sandun Kumara Herath Piyasenage	Sri Lanka	624	17	5
63	Devin Permaul	Guyana	624	15	6
64	Dominik Irrasch	Austria	622	10	4
65	Jan Vožech	Czech Republic	621	20	5
66	Mirjalol Karorov	Uzbekistan	620	22	3
67	Jacopo Forlani	San Marino	620	16	7
68	Chui Chun Man	Hong Kong	619	16	6
69	Märt Oona	Estonia	619	14	6
70	Dāvis Blāze	Latvia	616	13	4
71	Ahmad Huseinov	Azerbaijan	615	18	2
72	Vladimír Hurban	Slovakia	615	12	2
73	Areneo David	Malawi	615	11	4
74	Shahar Kleiner	Israel	615	11	4
–	Aly Abdelbar	Egypt	614	14	3
75	André Schori	Switzerland	614	13	5
76	Diego Castro	Guatemala	614	12	2
77	Dalius Mačernius	Lithuania	613	15	4
78	David Fredriksson	Sweden	613	11	2
79	Franck Eyeni	Ivory Coast	613	9	3
80	Gļebs Kononovs	Latvia	603	13	1
81	Vladas Šigauskas	Lithuania	603	9	4
82	Temur Makiev	Georgia	602	12	3
83	Karl Kivilo	Estonia	596	12	3
84	Zaur Gahramanov	Azerbaijan	592	7	2
85	Paolo Tura	San Marino	592	6	2
86	Ulukbek Kursanaliev	Kyrgyzstan	591	12	3
87	Mujahid Adam	Sudan	589	9	4
88	Edi Dvorani	Kosovo	587	14	5
89	Atdhe Luzhnica	Kosovo	585	8	4
90	Oliver Ormar Ingvarsson	Iceland	573	9	0
91	Gnagne N'Dri	Ivory Coast	572	8	2
92	Maxwell O'Keeffe	Ireland	545	7	4
93	Ibrahim Al-Tayeb	Yemen	270	0	0
94	Gummi Guðjónsson	Iceland	217	2	0

=== Elimination ===
==== Finals ====
Quarterfinals
33	(Moldova) Dan Olaru	26	28	27	28	29
40	(Poland) Sławomir Napłoszek	27	25	29	25	27
12	(Ukraine) Oleksii Hunbin	28	28	28	28	28
13	(Ukraine) Heorhiy Ivanytskyy	28	28	29	26	26
19	(Finland) Antti Vikström	29	24	29	29	27
22	(Hungary) Mátyás László Balogh	27	28	26	29	27
23	(Israel) Itay Shanny	28	25	27	28	24
2	(Russia) Galsan Bazarzhapov	28	28	26	29	28

Semifinals
33	(Moldova) Dan Olaru	29	27	30	29	29
12	(Ukraine) Oleksii Hunbin	28	28	30	29	27
19	(Finland) Antti Vikström	29	28	26	28	29
2	(Russia) Galsan Bazarzhapov	28	28	27	29	29

Final
33	(Moldova) Dan Olaru	26	29	28	28
2	(Russia) Galsan Bazarzhapov	27	28	29	29
Third Place Match
12	(Ukraine) Oleksii Hunbin	27	29	27	29	28
19	(Finland) Antti Vikström	27	29	28	29	28

==== Section 1 ====
1/48 eliminations
33	(Moldova) D Olaru	28	30	26
80	(Latvia) G Kononovs	25	25	24
81	(Lithuania) V Šigauskas	27	25	26	27	28	9
32	(Portugal) T Matos	28	27	25	27	26	9
65	(Czech Republic) J Vožech	24	25	26
48	(Uzbekistan) S Abdulkhamidov	27	28	28
49	(Croatia) L Černi	28	27	26
64	(Austria) D Irrasch	26	25	24

1/24 eliminations
33	(Moldova) D Olaru	26	27	25	28
32	(Portugal) T Matos	23	23	30	27
17	(Puerto Rico) A Muñoz	27	27	29
48	(Uzbekistan) S Abdulkhamidov	23	24	25
49	(Croatia) L Černi	24	25	25
16	(Croatia) M Mihalić	27	29	26

1/16 eliminations
1	(Luxembourg) J Henckels	24	28	27	27	26
33	(Moldova) D Olaru	25	25	28	27	29
17	(Puerto Rico) A Muñoz	26	27	27
16	(Croatia) M Mihalić	28	29	29

1/8 eliminations
33	(Moldova) D Olaru	27	29	27	26	30	9
16	(Croatia) M Mihalić	27	27	28	29	27	8

==== Section 2 ====
1/48 eliminations
57	(Georgia (country)) J Moseshvii	28	26	27
56	(Bulgaria) I Banchev	25	23	25
41	(Azerbaijan) M Aliyev	27	28	29
72	(Slovakia) V Hurban	24	27	26
89	(Kosovo) A Luzhnica	22	28	26	24	20
24	(Romania) M Timpu	27	24	26	26	27
25	(Poland) K Sierakowski	25	27	24
88	(Kosovo) E Dvorani	28	28	26
73	(Malawi) A David	27	22	26
40	(Poland) S Napłoszek	28	25	28

1/24 eliminations
9	(United States Virgin Islands) N D'Amour	26	26	24	27	25
57	(Georgia (country)) J Moseshvii	28	23	26	26	28
41	(Azerbaijan) M Aliyev	29	25	27	30
24	(Romania) M Timpu	25	26	24	27
88	(Kosovo) E Dvorani	22	27	24	21
40	(Poland) S Napłoszek	26	29	24	24

1/16 eliminations
57	(Georgia (country)) J Moseshvii	26	27	24
41	(Azerbaijan) M Aliyev	28	29	27
40	(Poland) S Napłoszek	25	29	27	28	28
8	(Belgium) J D Smedt	27	27	29	26	27

1/8 eliminations
41	(Azerbaijan) M Aliyev	26	28	26	27
40	(Poland) S Napłoszek	28	23	27	28

==== Section 3 ====
1/48 eliminations
37	(Switzerland) T Rufer	27	28	28	26	'29
76	(Guatemala) D Castro	28	25	24	26	25
85	(San Marino) P Tura	26	24	25	26
28	(Uzbekistan) Z Gafurov	25	29	28	27
21	(Belarus) A Prilepov	26	26	27
92	(Republic of Ireland) M O'Keeffe	23	24	20
69	(Estonia) M Oona	28	26	27	27	28	8
44	(Slovakia) J Duchoň	27	23	28	28	28	10
53	(Poland) M Szafran	26	29	26	25	23
44	(Sweden) J Andersson	29	24	27	24	24

1/24 eliminations
37	(Switzerland) T Rufer	28	28	28
28	(Uzbekistan) Z Gafurov	27	24	27
21	(Belarus) A Prilepov	22	27	27	24
44	(Slovakia) J Duchoň	25	28	25	27
44	(Sweden) J Andersson	27	25	30	25
12	(Ukraine) O Hunbin	28	30	28	30

1/16 eliminations
5	(Russia) A Tsybikzhapov	27	29	27	29
37	(Switzerland) T Rufer	24	25	30	26
44	(Slovakia) J Duchoň	24	29	28	25	23
12	(Ukraine) O Hunbin	29	26	28	28	25

1/8 eliminations
5	(Russia) A Tsybikzhapov	28	27	29	25
12	(Ukraine) O Hunbin	26	28	30	28

==== Section 4 ====
1/48 eliminations
61	(Philippines) R Silos	25	27	27	25	26
52	(Hong Kong) W C Kit	26	26	27	23	23
45	(Czech Republic) J Termer	27	28	28
68	(Hong Kong) C C Man	25	22	26
93	(Yemen) I Al-Tayeb	9	5	7
20	(Portugal) N Carneiro	28	26	30
29	(Georgia (country)) L Pkhakadze	27	24	28	28
84	(Azerbaijan) Z Gahramanov	26	26	27	24
77	(Lithuania) D Mačernius	27	26	26	24	28
36	(Finland) S Piippo	24	24	27	25	29

1/24 eliminations
13	(Ukraine) H Ivanytskyy	28	29	27
61	(Philippines) R Silos	23	25	26
45	(Czech Republic) J Termer	26	27	27	28	27
20	(Portugal) N Carneiro	26	28	26	28	23
29	(Georgia (country)) L Pkhakadze	25	28	28	29	26	7*
36	(Finland) S Piippo	26	28	26	25	27	7

1/16 eliminations
13	(Ukraine) H Ivanytskyy	27	26	27	28	28
45	(Czech Republic) J Termer	28	27	25	27	26
29	(Georgia (country)) L Pkhakadze	28	28	25
4	(Russia) B Tsynguev	29	30	26

1/8 eliminations
13	(Ukraine) H Ivanytskyy	24	27	29	29	29
4	(Russia) B Tsynguev	29	26	29	26	28

==== Section 5 ====
1/48 eliminations
35	(Philippines) J E Feliciano	30	27	28	24	27	10
78	(Sweden) D Fredriksson	23	27	29	26	22	8
83	(Estonia) K Kivilo	24	25	27
30	(Sri Lanka) S De Silva	27	28	28
19	(Finland) A Vikström	28	26	25
94	(Iceland) G Guðjónsson	23	24	21
67	(San Marino) J Forlani	24	24	23	24
46	(Sweden) K Sjöberg	27	23	27	27
51	(Hong Kong) C S H Moses	26	27	23	30
62	(Sri Lanka) S K H Piyasenage	22	28	24	27

1/24 eliminations
35	(Philippines) J E Feliciano	26	27	29	27
30	(Sri Lanka) S De Silva	28	29	26	29
19	(Finland) A Vikström	26	27	28	26	29	6*
46	(Sweden) K Sjöberg	27	28	26	26	28	6
51	(Hong Kong) C S H Moses	27	26	26	27	29
14	(El Salvador) Ó Ticas	18	27	27	26	28

1/16 eliminations
3	(Switzerland) F Faber	28	30	29
30	(Sri Lanka) S De Silva	26	29	25
19	(Finland) A Vikström	28	26	26	29	27	9
51	(Hong Kong) C S H Moses	28	29	28	28	25	8

1/8 eliminations
3	(Switzerland) F Faber	27	23	29	27	25
19	(Finland) A Vikström	28	29	26	26	26

==== Section 6 ====
1/48 eliminations
59	(Thailand) D Thepna	25	29	28	23	27	10
54	(Portugal) L Gonçalves	27	25	24	24	27	8
43	(Luxembourg) P Klein	25	25	27	27
70	(Latvia) D Blāze	26	27	27	27
91	(Ivory Coast) G N'Dri	23	22	19
22	(Hungary) M L Balogh	27	28	23
27	(Sri Lanka) R Dalpatadu	27	27	25	26	26
86	(Kyrgyzstan) U Kursanaliev	23	20	25	27	18
75	(Switzerland) A Schori	28	25	22	27	24
38	(Argentina) M D Jajarabilla	28	27	26	26	27

1/24 eliminations
11	(Belarus) A Liahusheu	24	26	26	27	27	9
59	(Thailand) D Thepna	26	25	27	26	27	10
70	(Latvia) D Blāze	23	30	27	23	25
22	(Hungary) M L Balogh	27	19	27	24	25
27	(Sri Lanka) R Dalpatadu	27	28	26	26	26
38	(Argentina) M D Jajarabilla	26	28	27	26	29

1/16 eliminations
59	(Thailand) D Thepna	27	26	25	28	28
22	(Hungary) M L Balogh	28	29	25	27	29
38	(Argentina) M D Jajarabilla	25	27	27	30	28
6	(Tajikistan) R Nam	30	27	27	28	24

1/8 eliminations
22	(Hungary) M L Balogh	30	25	28
38	(Argentina) M D Jajarabilla	21	19	27

==== Section 7 ====
1/48 eliminations
39	(Guatemala) T Flossbach	27	26	22
74	(Israel) S Kleiner	10	6	18
87	(Sudan) M Adam	22	25	25
26	(Czech Republic) M Hlahůlek	26	28	29
23	(Israel) I Shanny	24	26	26
90	(Iceland) O O Ingvarsson	23	25	20
71	(Azerbaijan) A Huseinov	23	24	25	26
42	(Latvia) J Bružis	23	28	29	28
55	(Austria) J Schweighofer	25	25	26	26
58	(Belarus) A Tsiareta	26	26	25	27

1/24 eliminations
39	(Guatemala) T Flossbach	25	29	28	27
26	(Czech Republic) M Hlahůlek	27	27	27	25
23	(Israel) I Shanny	25	27	26	28
42	(Latvia) J Bružis	28	26	25	25
58	(Belarus) A Tsiareta	27	25	28	28	27
10	(Belgium) S Roos	27	28	28	28	27

1/16 eliminations
7	(Croatia) A Remar	28	27	28	28	28
39	(Guatemala) T Flossbach	29	27	27	27	28
23	(Israel) I Shanny	28	27	26	28	29	9
10	(Belgium) S Roos	29	26	26	29	28	8

1/8 eliminations
7	(Croatia) A Remar	24	28	28	26	28
23	(Israel) I Shanny	24	29	28	26	28

==== Section 8 ====
1/48 eliminations
63	(Guyana) D Permaul	25	27	27	26	25
50	(Thailand) W Thamwong	26	26	28	25	29
47	(Belgium) B Adriaensen	26	26	26	28
66	(Uzbekistan) M Karorov	25	26	24	28
31	(Ukraine) I Kozhokar	29	28	28	28
82	(Georgia (country)) T Makiev	29	25	26	28
79	(Ivory Coast) F Eyeni	27	25	27	29	25
34	(Slovakia) M Duchoň	27	26	27	27	27

1/24 eliminations
15	(Finland) A Tekoniemi	25	27	26	26
50	(Thailand) W Thamwong	29	23	27	28
47	(Belgium) B Adriaensen	23	29	27	27
18	(Austria) A Gstöttner	29	28	25	26
31	(Ukraine) I Kozhokar	28	28	29	25	28	10
34	(Slovakia) M Duchoň	27	29	27	27	28	9

1/16 eliminations
50	(Thailand) W Thamwong	29	25	26	24
47	(Belgium) B Adriaensen	25	26	29	28
31	(Ukraine) I Kozhokar	29	26	26	28
2	(Russia) G Bazarzhapov	29	30	29	28

1/8 eliminations
47	(Belgium) B Adriaensen	27	26	29	26
2	(Russia) G Bazarzhapov	28	27	28	28

== Women's individual ==
=== Qualification ===
Women's Qualification
Rank	Archers	Nation	Total	10s	Xs
–	Deepika Kumari	India	679	35	9
–	Casey Kaufhold	United States	675	37	12
–	Ana Vázquez	Mexico	674	37	9
–	Alejandra Valencia	Mexico	672	33	12
–	Mackenzie Brown	United States	668	34	9
–	Chiara Rebagliati	Italy	665	28	10
–	Komalika Bari	India	662	28	7
–	Yasemin Anagöz	Turkey	654	26	10
–	Tatiana Andreoli	Italy	654	25	12
–	Ana Rendón	Colombia	654	23	3
–	Randi Degn	Denmark	653	27	4
1	Magdalena Śmiałkowska	Poland	653	21	6
–	Diananda Choirunisa	Indonesia	652	29	8
–	Maja Jager	Denmark	652	23	8
–	Ankita Bhakat	India	651	24	12
2	Ziyodakhon Abdusattorova	Uzbekistan	648	22	6
–	Kirstine Andersen	Denmark	648	21	7
–	Mélanie Gaubil	France	648	21	5
–	Gülnaz Coşkun	Turkey	647	25	8
–	Lisa Barbelin	France	647	22	10
–	Aída Román	Mexico	647	21	7
–	Asya Karataylı	Turkey	645	25	7
3	Ana Umer	Slovenia	645	25	5
–	Lucilla Boari	Italy	644	23	7
–	Rezza Octavia	Indonesia	644	22	7
4	Asel Sharbekova	Kyrgyzstan	644	20	4
5	Alina Ilyassova	Kazakhstan	642	24	7
–	Elia Canales	Spain	642	22	6
–	Inés de Velasco	Spain	642	21	10
–	Denisa Baránková	Slovakia	641	24	6
–	Alexandra Longová	Slovakia	638	19	7
–	Jennifer Mucino-Fernandez	United States	638	17	8
6	Anna Tobolewska	Poland	637	12	2
–	Ane Marcelle dos Santos	Brazil	636	14	6
–	Sarah Nikitin	Brazil	635	20	4
–	Alice Ingley	Australia	634	18	7
7	Zahra Nemati	Iran	632	20	8
8	Mădălina Amaistroaie	Romania	632	20	6
9	Špela Ferš	Slovenia	632	17	6
–	Angéline Cohendet	France	629	22	1
10	Marie Horáčková	Czech Republic	629	20	8
11	Sylwia Zyzańska	Poland	627	20	9
12	Kamola Yunusova	Uzbekistan	627	20	4
13	Evangelia Psarra	Greece	627	17	5
14	Narisara Khunhiranchaiyo	Thailand	626	15	2
15	Farida Tukebayeva	Kazakhstan	625	19	11
16	Jindřiška Vaněčková	Czech Republic	625	16	3
17	Pia Elizabeth Angela Bidaure	Philippines	625	13	7
18	Iliana Deineko	Switzerland	624	15	6
19	Elisabeth Straka	Austria	624	14	5
20	Simone Gerster	Switzerland	624	9	4
21	Dobromira Danailova	Bulgaria	623	19	4
22	Laura Nurmsalu	Estonia	622	13	7
23	Nina Riess	Austria	622	13	5
24	Beatrice Miklos	Romania	621	17	6
25	Mahta Abdollahi	Iran	621	13	2
26	Syaqiera Mashayikh	Malaysia	619	16	4
27	Nurul Azreena Mohamad Fazil	Malaysia	619	16	3
–	Laura Paeglis	Australia	618	22	11
28	Triinu Lilienthal	Estonia	618	20	7
29	Mahanaz Akter Monera	Bangladesh	618	14	7
30	Florencia Leithold	Argentina	618	14	5
–	Christine Bjerendal	Sweden	616	14	6
–	Leyre Fernández	Spain	612	17	6
31	Anatoli Martha Gkorila	Greece	612	16	8
32	Klára Grapová	Czech Republic	611	16	5
–	Titik Kusumawardani	Indonesia	611	6	2
–	Ana Luiza Caetano	Brazil	610	14	5
–	Valentina Acosta	Colombia	608	11	4
33	Urška Čavič	Slovenia	607	18	7
34	Shiva Shojamehr	Iran	607	13	5
35	Diya Siddique	Bangladesh	607	13	3
36	Gabrielle Monica Bidaure	Philippines	606	6	1
37	Tsiko Phutkaradze	Georgia	605	9	1
38	Jibek Kanatbek Kyzy	Kyrgyzstan	604	6	1
39	Valentine de Giuli	Switzerland	603	13	6
40	Yaylagul Ramazanova	Azerbaijan	603	12	3
41	Reena Pärnat	Estonia	602	15	5
–	Maira Sepúlveda	Colombia	602	12	4
42	Munira Nurmanova	Uzbekistan	599	17	4
43	Gajane Bottinelli	Finland	599	13	7
44	Jeļena Kononova	Latvia	598	13	3
–	Elin Kättström	Sweden	598	11	2
45	Beauty Ray	Bangladesh	598	9	3
46	Ida-Lotta Lassila	Finland	596	14	2
47	Bishindeegiin Urantungalag	Mongolia	596	13	6
48	Nur Ain Ayuni Fozi	Malaysia	594	9	4
49	Khatuna Narimanidze	Georgia	587	11	7
50	Iida Tukiainen	Finland	586	11	4
51	Anastassiya Bannova	Kazakhstan	584	15	5
52	Inga Timinskienė	Lithuania	579	9	5
–	Elena Bendíková	Slovakia	577	14	5
–	Erika Jangnäs	Sweden	568	11	4
53	Emma Louise Davis	Ireland	568	6	1
54	Nana Makharadze	Georgia	560	5	4
55	Martina Wöll	Austria	555	11	4
56	Svetlana Simonova	Azerbaijan	550	6	1
57	Mayte Paredes	Bolivia	545	5	2
58	Marín Aníta Hilmarsdóttir	Iceland	540	5	1
59	Nazrin Zamanova	Azerbaijan	532	7	5
–	Fatou Gbane	Ivory Coast	526	4	2
60	Anne Abernathy	United States Virgin Islands	523	8	1
61	Diana Kanatbek Kyzy	Kyrgyzstan	518	2	0
–	Esmei Diombo	Ivory Coast	517	1	0
62	Ciara Dunne	Ireland	365	4	2

=== Elimination ===
==== Finals ====
Quarterfinals
1	(Poland) Magdalena Śmiałkowska	22	22	27	26
8	(Romania) Mădălina Amaistroaie	26	23	25	28
5	(Kazakhstan) Alina Ilyassova	27	25	25	24
13	(Greece) Evangelia Psarra	21	27	27	27
19	(Austria) Elisabeth Straka	24	23	23	26
11	(Poland) Sylwia Zyzańska	22	25	25	27
10	(Czech Republic) Marie Horáčková	28	28	27	25	25
47	(Mongolia) Bishindeegiin Urantungalag	27	26	29	26	24

Semifinals
8	(Romania) Mădălina Amaistroaie	26	28	28	26
13	(Greece) Evangelia Psarra	25	25	29	23
11	(Poland) Sylwia Zyzańska	29	27	27	29
10	(Czech Republic) Marie Horáčková	28	27	25	29

Final
8	(Romania) Mădălina Amaistroaie	28	26	28	26	28
11	(Poland) Sylwia Zyzańska	26	27	27	29	24
Third Place Match
13	(Greece) Evangelia Psarra	27	26	29	26	26
10	(Czech Republic) Marie Horáčková	28	26	27	29	28

==== Section 1 ====
1/48 eliminations

1/24 eliminations
33	(Slovenia) U Čavič	20	24	25	21
32	(Czech Republic) K Grapová	25	25	23	23
17	(Philippines) P E A Bidaure	28	27	22	27
48	(Malaysia) N A A Fozi	28	27	25	28
49	(Georgia (country)) K Narimanidze	24	28	22	26	27	9*
16	(Czech Republic) J Vaněčková	26	22	26	26	26	9

1/16 eliminations
1	(Poland) M Śmiałkowska	24	27	27	29
32	(Czech Republic) K Grapová	28	26	26	26
48	(Malaysia) N A A Fozi	27	25	27	27	27
49	(Georgia (country)) K Narimanidze	27	28	16	26	24

1/8 eliminations
1	(Poland) M Śmiałkowska	27	26	28
48	(Malaysia) N A A Fozi	24	25	26

==== Section 2 ====
1/48 eliminations
57	(Bolivia) M Paredes	20	22	22	29
56	(Azerbaijan) S Simonova	23	13	21	25

1/24 eliminations
9	(Slovenia) S Ferš	24	25	24	21
57	(Bolivia) M Paredes	25	22	27	23
41	(Estonia) R Pärnat	27	29	30
24	(Romania) B Miklos	22	25	29
25	(Iran) M Abdollahi	26	26	26
40	(Azerbaijan) Y Ramazanova	25	24	25

1/16 eliminations
57	(Bolivia) M Paredes	22	26	20	23
41	(Estonia) R Pärnat	25	26	27	28
25	(Iran) M Abdollahi	29	26	29	27	25	9
8	(Romania) M Amaistroaie	25	28	29	26	29	10

1/8 eliminations
41	(Estonia) R Pärnat	26	27	26	26	25
8	(Romania) M Amaistroaie	27	25	24	27	28

==== Section 3 ====
1/48 eliminations
53	(Republic of Ireland) E L Davis	27	28	23
60	(United States Virgin Islands) A Abernathy	16	24	22

1/24 eliminations
37	(Georgia (country)) T Phutkaradze	26	26	27
28	(Estonia) T Lilienthal	24	22	22
21	(Bulgaria) D Danailova	24	26	25	25
44	(Latvia) J Kononova	26	26	26	25
53	(Republic of Ireland) E L Davis	24	23	22	27	16
12	(Uzbekistan) K Yunusova	18	26	25	21	23

1/16 eliminations
5	(Kazakhstan) A Ilyassova	26	26	28	26
37	(Georgia (country)) T Phutkaradze	28	24	23	23
44	(Latvia) J Kononova	23	23	24
12	(Uzbekistan) K Yunusova	24	24	25

1/8 eliminations
5	(Kazakhstan) A Ilyassova	27	28	25	28
12	(Uzbekistan) K Yunusova	24	26	26	27

==== Section 4 ====
1/48 eliminations
61	(Kyrgyzstan) D Kanatbek Kyzy	26	26	24	24	24
52	(Lithuania) I Timinskienė	18	22	25	29	25

1/24 eliminations
13	(Greece) E Psarra	27	29	24	22
52	(Lithuania) I Timinskienė	21	25	26	21
45	(Bangladesh) B Ray	25	24	24	25
20	(Switzerland) S Gerster	26	25	24	28
29	(Bangladesh) M A Monera	24	27	27	23	20
36	(Philippines) G M Bidaure	24	24	27	27	27

1/16 eliminations
13	(Greece) E Psarra	28	25	23	26
20	(Switzerland) S Gerster	23	24	26	22
36	(Philippines) G M Bidaure	25	25	28	23	28
4	(Kyrgyzstan) A Sharbekova	29	29	27	21	26

1/8 eliminations
13	(Greece) E Psarra	26	23	25	25
36	(Philippines) G M Bidaure	24	26	23	24

==== Section 5 ====
1/48 eliminations
51	(Kazakhstan) A Bannova	25	22	24	28
62	(Republic of Ireland) C Dunne	23	17	25	17

1/24 eliminations
35	(Bangladesh) D Siddique	27	29	27
30	(Argentina) F Leithold	24	25	24
19	(Austria) E Straka	25	24	26	28	30
46	(Finland) I Lassila	24	25	24	30	25
51	(Kazakhstan) A Bannova	22	26	28	26	29
14	(Thailand) N Khunhiranchaiyo	27	30	26	23	25

1/16 eliminations
3	(Slovenia) A Umer	26	27	26	26	23	8*
35	(Bangladesh) D Siddique	25	25	27	28	23	8
19	(Austria) E Straka	29	26	25	25	28
51	(Kazakhstan) A Bannova	25	25	28	26	26

1/8 eliminations
3	(Slovenia) A Umer	26	26	28	29	25
19	(Austria) E Straka	29	26	28	27	28

==== Section 6 ====
1/48 eliminations
59	(Azerbaijan) N Zamanova	24	23	26	21	23	6
54	(Georgia (country)) N Makharadze	25	22	26	26	20	9

1/24 eliminations
11	(Poland) S Zyzańska	28	28	30
54	(Georgia (country)) N Makharadze	26	25	19
43	(Finland) G Bottinelli	23	26	27	27	25	9*
22	(Estonia) L Nurmsalu	27	23	27	23	26	9
27	(Malaysia) N A M Fazil	28	27	25
38	(Kyrgyzstan) J Kanatbek Kyzy	23	25	23

1/16 eliminations
11	(Poland) S Zyzańska	24	27	27	24	28
43	(Finland) G Bottinelli	25	26	26	28	26
27	(Malaysia) N A M Fazil	24	26	25	27
6	(Poland) A Tobolewska	28	24	26	29

1/8 eliminations
11	(Poland) S Zyzańska	26	28	27	28
6	(Poland) A Tobolewska	27	25	26	26

==== Section 7 ====
1/48 eliminations
55	(Austria) M Wöll	21	26	26	21	19
58	(Iceland) M A Hilmarsdóttir	20	21	27	21	17

1/24 eliminations
39	(Switzerland) V de Giuli	23	28	27	29
26	(Malaysia) S Mashayikh	25	22	24	20
23	(Austria) N Riess	27	23	26	24
42	(Uzbekistan) M Nurmanova	25	26	25	22
55	(Austria) M Wöll	25	25	19
10	(Czech Republic) M Horáčková	27	26	27

1/16 eliminations
7	(Iran) Z Nemati	25	20	27	28	26	8
39	(Switzerland) V de Giuli	25	27	24	26	27	9
23	(Austria) N Riess	26	22	27
10	(Czech Republic) M Horáčková	30	29	28

1/8 eliminations
39	(Switzerland) V de Giuli	23	24	24
10	(Czech Republic) M Horáčková	28	27	28

==== Section 8 ====
1/48 eliminations

1/24 eliminations
15	(Uzbekistan) F Tukebayeva	27	24	28	29
50	(Finland) I Tukiainen	26	28	23	25
47	(Mongolia) B. Urantungalag	26	28	26
18	(Switzerland) I Deineko	22	25	24
31	(Greece) A M Gkorila	29	24	27	29	28
34	(Iran) S Shojamehr	24	27	27	29	22

1/16 eliminations
15	(Uzbekistan) F Tukebayeva	26	28	28
47	(Mongolia) B. Urantungalag	28	30	30
31	(Greece) A M Gkorila	24	27	25	26
2	(Uzbekistan) Z Abdusattorova	27	27	26	27

1/8 eliminations
47	(Mongolia) B. Urantungalag	27	28	27
2	(Uzbekistan) Z Abdusattorova	25	26	26

== Men's team ==
=== Qualification ===
Rank	Nation	10s	Xs	Total
1	United States	115	41	2031
2	Germany	101	29	2028
3	Italy	97	36	2023
4	France	102	38	2022
5	Russia	102	36	2021
6	Indonesia	91	25	1999
7	Malaysia	86	25	1999
8	Canada	91	34	1997
9	Spain	81	33	1986
10	Mongolia	81	28	1986
11	Bangladesh	92	23	1985
12	Mexico	81	30	1980
13	Brazil	81	23	1980
14	Turkey	94	32	1979
15	Ukraine	81	18	1978
16	Belgium	81	27	1971
17	Slovenia	87	32	1968
18	Finland	75	23	1968
19	Croatia	78	25	1964
20	Belarus	74	22	1951
21	Iran	71	23	1938
22	Portugal	66	23	1937
23	Switzerland	72	26	1934
24	Poland	68	17	1927
25	Sri Lanka	62	20	1925
26	Colombia	57	17	1917
27	Czech Republic	65	18	1913
28	Austria	60	19	1911
29	Uzbekistan	57	11	1906
30	Slovakia	59	20	1903
31	Egypt	53	15	1899
32	Hong Kong	54	19	1884
33	Georgia	55	12	1881
34	Sweden	45	15	1877
35	Latvia	49	15	1861
36	Azerbaijan	46	14	1850

=== Elimination ===
1/12 eliminations
17	Slovenia	51	57	54	56
16	Belgium	56	56	53	55
9	Spain	52	55	57	58
24	Poland	53	54	53	54
21	Iran	52	56	56
12	Mexico	55	57	57
13	Brazil	52	53	50
20	Belarus	53	53	51

1/8 eliminations
1	United States	58	55	54	54
17	Slovenia	54	52	55	51
9	Spain	55	55	56	55
8	Canada	55	55	53	55
5	Russia	56	53	56	54
12	Mexico	59	55	53	56
20	Belarus	53	52	54
4	France	53	55	56

Quarterfinals
1	United States	57	54	53	59
9	Spain	56	50	57	53
12	Mexico	53	56	54	53
4	France	53	54	57	56

Semifinals
1	United States	57	58	59
4	France	51	56	54

1/12 eliminations
19	Croatia	56	55	56	54
14	Turkey	52	58	54	54
11	Bangladesh	56	56	57
22	Portugal	54	55	54
23	Switzerland	55	53	53	56	25
10	Mongolia	54	55	56	53	26
15	Ukraine	58	54	54	51	28
18	Finland	57	56	51	54	26

1/8 eliminations
3	Italy	56	60	57
19	Croatia	53	54	55
11	Bangladesh	54	54	54
6	Indonesia	56	55	56
7	Malaysia	58	56	54	57
10	Mongolia	53	57	49	52
15	Ukraine	57	48	55	58
2	Germany	57	58	52	55

Quarterfinals
3	Italy	54	49	54
6	Indonesia	58	52	54
7	Malaysia	54	54	58	49
15	Ukraine	55	55	55	53

Semifinals
6	Indonesia	57	56	51
15	Ukraine	52	52	46

Finals

Final
1	United States	54	57	55	58
6	Indonesia	54	52	56	55

Third Place Match
4	France	59	53	55
15	Ukraine	52	52	51

== Women's team ==
=== Qualification ===
Rank	Nation	10s	Xs	Total
1	Mexico	91	28	1993
2	India	87	28	1992
3	United States	88	29	1981
4	Italy	76	29	1963
5	Denmark	71	19	1953
6	Turkey	76	25	1946
7	France	65	16	1924
8	Poland	53	17	1917
9	Indonesia	57	17	1907
10	Spain	60	22	1896
11	Slovenia	60	18	1884
12	Brazil	48	15	1881
13	Uzbekistan	59	14	1874
14	Czech Republic	52	16	1865
15	Colombia	46	11	1864
16	Iran	46	15	1860
17	Slovakia	57	18	1856
18	Kazakhstan	58	23	1851
19	Switzerland	37	16	1851
20	Estonia	48	19	1842
21	Malaysia	41	11	1832
22	Bangladesh	36	13	1823
23	Austria	38	14	1801
24	Sweden	36	12	1782
25	Finland	38	13	1781
26	Kyrgyzstan	28	5	1766
27	Georgia	25	12	1752
28	Azerbaijan	25	9	1685

=== Elimination ===
1/12 eliminations
17	Slovakia	45	49	53	56
16	Iran	52	48	47	48
9	Indonesia	53	54	54
24	Sweden	46	47	53
21	Malaysia	51	54	51	42
12	Brazil	54	53	56	54
13	Uzbekistan	54	52	50
20	Estonia	44	50	49

1/8 eliminations
1	Mexico	53	53	53
17	Slovakia	51	48	51
9	Indonesia	55	52	51	53
8	Poland	51	54	50	52
5	Denmark	49	48	52
12	Brazil	53	52	53
13	Uzbekistan	51	51	54
4	Italy	54	56	56

Quarterfinals
1	Mexico	49	52	54	56	30
9	Indonesia	53	53	51	52	26
12	Brazil	52	56	52
4	Italy	52	57	55

Semifinals
1	Mexico	54	52	55
4	Italy	53	52	50

1/12 eliminations
19	Switzerland	53	52	48	58
14	Czech Republic	49	55	51	49
11	Slovenia	47	55	54
22	Bangladesh	44	51	54
23	Austria	53	50	42
10	Spain	54	53	49
15	Colombia	56	51	55	52
18	Kazakhstan	52	52	53	49

1/8 eliminations
3	United States	54	52	55	55
14	Czech Republic	49	53	49	49
11	Slovenia	48	50	52	52
6	Turkey	55	52	47	54
7	France	54	51	52	52
10	Spain	51	51	54	53
15	Colombia	55	51	53
2	India	54	49	52

Quarterfinals
3	United States	54	53	57	52	25
6	Turkey	50	54	52	55	25
10	Spain	51	50	52	50
15	Colombia	49	56	52	49

Semifinals
1	United States	57	55	55
10	Spain	50	54	51

Finals

Final
1	Mexico	53	56	59	56
3	United States	56	53	56	56

Third Place Match
4	Italy	57	59	56	53
10	Spain	51	53	57	53

== See also ==
- Archery at the 2020 Summer Olympics – Qualification
- Archery at the 2020 Summer Olympics
