= Archery at the 2027 European Games =

- Venue: Istanbul
- Dates: 18–24 June
- Competitors: 128

At the 2027 European Games in Istanbul, eight events of archery will be contested, all in a target archery format. Five events will be held with recurve bows, mirroring the five 2024 Olympic events, and three events with compound bows, two individual events and a mixed pairs event. The compound mixed pair event will also feature in the 2028 Summer Olympics, but the individual events shall not.

Each of the six events that is also an Olympic event will also be a continental qualification event for the Los Angeles 2028 Games.

== Qualification ==
As Host, Turkey receives automatic entry to each event, including team events. For other NOCS, the primary qualification event for Istanbul 2027 was the 2026 European Archery Championships which awarded five men's and women's teams, and 16 individual men's and women's quotas in recurve, and eight individual quotas in men's and women's compound. Those NOCs who did not qualify via the European Championships can take part in the final qualification event in March 2027, the first leg of the European Grand Prix.

=== Recurve ===
NOCs that qualified a men or women's team quota automatically qualify all team members for the respective individual event. NOCs that qualify at least one man and one woman are automatically eligible for the mixed team event. There are no specific quotas for the mixed team event.

Recurve	Men		Women	
Recurve	Team	Individual	Team	Individual
Host	Turkey		Turkey	
2026 European Championships	Germany (GER); Spain (ESP); France (FRA); Slovenia (SLO); Italy (ITA)	Individual Neutral Athletes (AIN); Austria (AUT); Azerbaijan (AZE); Belgium (BEL); Bulgaria (BUL); Croatia (CRO); Czech Republic (CZE); Finland (FIN); Georgia (GEO); Great Britain (GBR); Moldova (MDA); Netherlands (NED); Poland (POL); Serbia (SRB); Switzerland (SUI); Ukraine (UKR)	Germany (GER); Great Britain (GBR); France (FRA); Belarus (BLR); Italy (ITA)	Individual Neutral Athletes (AIN); Austria (AUT); Czech Republic (CZE); Denmark (DEN); Spain (ESP); Estonia (EST); Finland (FIN); Georgia (GEO); Moldova (MDA); Netherlands (NED); Poland (POL); Romania (ROU); Slovakia (SVK); Slovenia (SLO); Switzerland (SUI); Ukraine (UKR)
2026 European Grand Prix 1st leg, Antalya (Turkey) , 22-27 March 2027	2 teams	5 individuals	2 teams	5 individuals
Universality places	-	3 individuals	-	3 individuals
TOTAL (to Date)	18 archers	16 archers (plus 18)	18 archers	16 archers (plus 18)

=== Compound ===
There are no quota places specifically for the mixed compound event. NOCs that qualify both one man and one woman are automatically eligible for the mixed team event.

Compound	Men	Women
Compound	Individual	Individual
Host	Turkey (TUR)	Turkey (TUR)
2026 European Championships	Belgium (BEL); Denmark (DEN); France (FRA); Great Britain (GBR); Germany (GER); Italy (ITA); Netherlands (NED); Poland (POL)	Croatia (CRO); Denmark (DEN); Spain (ESP); Estonia (EST); Great Britain (GBR); Italy (ITA); Netherlands (NED); Ukraine (UKR)
2026 European Grand Prix 1st leg, Antalya (Turkey) , 22-27 March 2027	5 individuals	5 individuals
Universality plaxes	2 individuals	2 individuals
TOTAL (to date)	9 archers	9 archers

=== Summary ===
The following NOCs have earned quotas in the indicated events:

Nation	Recurve					Compound			Total
Nation	Men's individual	Men's team	Women's individual	Women's team	Mixed team	Men's individual	Women's individual	Mixed team	Total
Individual Neutral Athletes			1						1
Austria			1						1
Azerbaijan	1								1
Belarus			3	X					3
Belgium	1					1			2
Bulgaria	1								1
Croatia	1						1		1
Czech Republic	1		1		X				2
Denmark			1			1	1	X	3
Estonia			1				1		2
Finland	1		1		X				2
France	3	X	3	X	X	1			7
Georgia	1		1		X				2
Germany	3	X	3	X	X	1			7
Great Britain	1		3	X	X	1	1	X	6
Italy	3	X	3	X	X	1	1	X	8
Moldova	1		1		X				2
Netherlands	1		1		X	1	1	X	4
Poland	1		1		X	1			3
Romania			1						1
Serbia	1								1
Slovakia			1						1
Slovenia	3	X	1		X				4
Spain	3	X	1		X		1		5
Switzerland	1		1		X				2
Turkey (host)	3	X	3	X	X	1	1	X	8
Ukraine	1		1		X		1		3
	34/48	6/8	34/48	6/8	15	9/16	9/16	5	82/128

== Medal table ==
* Host nation (Turkey)

Rank	NOC	Gold	Silver	Bronze	Total
1	Turkey*	0	0	0	0
Totals (1 entries)		0	0	0	0

== Medal summary ==
=== Recurve ===
Event	Gold	Silver	Bronze
Men's individual			
Men's team			
Women's individual			
Women's team			
Mixed team			

=== Compound ===
Event	Gold	Silver	Bronze
Men's individual			
Women's individual			
Mixed team			

== Los Angeles 2028 qualification ==
The Archery tournament at the 2027 European Games is a direct qualification event for the archery program in Los Angeles 2028.

Event	Qualification path	Quotas	NOCS
Recurve Individual Men	NOCs of the two (2) highest placed athletes from different NOCs will each earn one (1) quota place in the relevant gender.	2	
Recurve Individual Women	NOCs of the two (2) highest placed athletes from different NOCs will each earn one (1) quota place in the relevant gender.	2	
Recurve Mixed Team:	One NOC of the highest placed mixed team will earn one (1) women's and one (1) men's quota place for a total of two (2) quota places and entry to the team event.	2	
Recurve Men's Team	One NOC of the highest placed Men's team will earn three (3) quota place in the relevant gender, and entry to the team event.	3	
Recurve Women's Team	One NOC of the highest placed Women's team will earn three (3) quota place in the relevant gender, and entry to the team event.	3	
Compound Mixed Team:	One NOC of the highest placed mixed team will earn one (1) women's and one (1) men's quota place for a total of two (2) quota places and entry to the team event.	2	
Total quota places		14	
