= Archery at the 2020 Summer Paralympics – Qualification =

Qualification for archery at the 2020 Summer Paralympics begins on 1 June 2019 and ends on 1 July 2020.

== Timeline ==
Competition	Date	Venue	Berths
2019 World Para Archery Championships	3–9 June 2019	(Netherlands) Den Bosch	80 qualified slots 50 males 30 females
2019 Continental Qualification Tournament (Asia)	19–26 October 2019	(Thailand) Bangkok	10 qualified slots 5 males 5 females
2020 Continental Qualification Tournament (Americas)	22–28 March 2021	(Mexico) Monterrey	10 qualified slots 5 males 5 females
~~2020 Continental Qualification Tournament (Europe)~~	~~30 April - 9 May 2021~~	(Italy) ~~Olbia~~	10 qualified slots 5 males 5 females
2020 World Qualification Tournament (incorporating 2020 Continental Qualification Tournament (Europe))	4–11 July 2021	(Czech Republic) Nové Město nad Metují	12 qualified slots 6 males 6 females PLUS; 10 CQT European spots
Host country allocation	-	-	6 qualified slots 3 males 3 females
Bipartite Commission Invitation Allocation	1–31 May 2020	-	12 qualified slots 6 males 6 females
Total			140

== Quotas ==
Qualification slots are allocated to the NPC, not to an individual athlete. However, bipartite commissions are allocated to the athlete, not to the NPC.

- An NPC can enter a maximum of three eligible athletes per individual event.
- An NPC can enter a team of one male and female in the mixed team events.

=== Continental quotas ===
Men

Competition	Venue	Individual W1 Max 3 per NPC	Individual Compound Open Max 3 per NPC	Individual Recurve Max 3 per NPC
Host nation	-	-	Japan (JPN)	-
2019 World Para Archery Championships (mixed team)	(Netherlands) Den Bosch	China (CHN); Czech Republic (CZE); Japan (JPN); RPC (RUS)	China (CHN); Iran (IRI); Italy (ITA); RPC (RUS)	China (CHN); Italy (ITA); RPC (RUS); South Korea (KOR)
2019 World Para Archery Championships (individual events)	(Netherlands) Den Bosch	China (CHN); Czech Republic (CZE)	Australia (AUS); China (CHN); Finland (FIN); France (FRA); Great Britain (GBR); Great Britain (GBR); India (IND); India (IND); Iran (IRI); Italy (ITA); Slovakia (SVK); Slovakia (SVK); Thailand (THA); Thailand (THA); Turkey (TUR); Turkey (TUR); Ukraine (UKR); United States (USA); United States (USA); United States (USA)	China (CHN); France (FRA); Great Britain (GBR); Germany (GER); India (IND); India (IND); Iran (IRI); Iran (IRI); Japan (JPN); Malaysia (MAS); Poland (POL); RPC (RUS); Thailand (THA); Turkey (TUR); Turkey (TUR); United States (USA); United States (USA)
2019 Continental Qualification Tournament (Asia)	(Thailand) Bangkok	Iran (IRI)	Hong Kong (HKG); Malaysia (MAS)	Mongolia (MGL); Sri Lanka (SRI)
2020 Continental Qualification Tournament (Americas)	(Mexico) Monterrey	Brazil (BRA)	Brazil (BRA); Colombia (COL)	Brazil (BRA); Mexico (MEX)
2020 Continental Qualification Tournament (Europe)	~~(Italy) Olbia~~ (Czech Republic) Nove Mesto	Hungary (HUN)	RPC (RPC); Belgium (BEL)	France (FRA); Slovakia (SVK)
2020 World Qualification Tournament	(Czech Republic) Nove Mesto	South Korea (KOR); Turkey (TUR)	Australia (AUS); France (FRA)	Romania (ROU); Czech Republic (CZE)
Bipartite Commission Invitation	-	South Africa (RSA)	Costa Rica (CRC); Iraq (IRQ); South Africa (RSA)	Australia (AUS); Bhutan (BHU); Slovenia (SLO)
Total (80 berths)		12	26	32

Women

Competition	Venue	Individual W1 Max 3 per NPC	Individual Compound Open Max 3 per NPC	Individual Recurve Max 3 per NPC
Host nation	-		Japan (JPN)	-
2019 World Para Archery Championships (mixed team)	(Netherlands) Den Bosch	China (CHN); Czech Republic (CZE); Japan (JPN); RPC (RUS)	China (CHN); Iran (IRI); Italy (ITA); RPC (RUS)	China (CHN); Italy (ITA); RPC (RUS); South Korea (KOR)
2019 World Para Archery Championships (individual events)	(Netherlands) Den Bosch	China (CHN); South Korea (KOR)	Brazil (BRA); France (FRA); Great Britain (GBR); Italy (ITA); RPC (RUS); Singapore (SGP); Sweden (SWE); Turkey (TUR)	China (CHN); Great Britain (GBR); Italy (ITA); Japan (JPN); Japan (JPN); Poland (POL); Turkey (TUR); Ukraine (UKR)
2019 Continental Qualification Tournament (Asia)	(Thailand) Bangkok	—	China (CHN); China (CHN)	South Korea (KOR); Thailand (THA)
2020 Continental Qualification Tournament (Americas)	(Mexico) Monterrey	United States (USA)	Canada (CAN); Chile (CHI)	Brazil (BRA); United States (USA)
2020 Continental Qualification Tournament (Europe)	~~(Italy) Olbia~~ (Czech Republic) Nove Mesto	Italy (ITA)	Great Britain (GBR); Turkey (TUR)	RPC (RPC); Greece (GRE)
2020 World Qualification Tournament	(Czech Republic) Nove Mesto	Great Britain (GBR); Turkey (TUR)	Spain (ESP); South Korea (KOR)	Australia (AUS); Ukraine (UKR)
Bipartite Commission Invitation	-	Czech Republic (CZE); Brazil (BRA)	India (IND); Ireland (IRL); Thailand (THA)	Colombia (COL); Iraq (IRQ); Latvia (LAT)
Total (50 berths)		12	24	24

Mixed teams

The following teams are qualified in each of the mixed team events:

Competition	Mixed W1 Team	Mixed Compound Team	Mixed Recurve Team
Qualified nations	China (CHN); Czech Republic (CZE); Japan (JPN); RPC (RPC); South Korea (KOR); Turkey (TUR); Brazil (BRA)	China (CHN); Italy (ITA); Japan (JPN); RPC (RPC); Iran (IRI); France (FRA); Great Britain (GBR); Thailand (THA); RPC (RPC); Iran (IRI)	China (CHN); Czech Republic (CZE); Japan (JPN); RPC (RPC)

== See also ==
- Archery at the 2020 Summer Olympics – Qualification
