= James Woodgate =

British archer (born 2002)

Personal information
- Nationality: British
- Born: 29 May 2002 (age 24) Shepperton, United Kingdom

Sport
- Sport: Archery
- Event: Recurve

James Woodgate (born 29 May 2002) is a British archer competing in men's recurve events. He competed at the 2020 Summer Olympics in Tokyo, Japan.

== Early life and education ==
Woodgate grew up in the village of Shepperton in Surrey. He attended Halliford School before going on to study Physics at the University of Warwick.

== Career ==
Woodgate's made his first international appearance for Great Britain in the 2019 season in the Under 18 age group at the European Youth Cup. In the same season, he placed 17th at the 2019 World Archery Youth Championships, hosted in Madrid, Spain. Earlier in the 2019 season, Woodgate also set a world record for the Double 60 Metres Round (2x72 arrows) for the Under 18 age group, with a score of 1299/1440.

In 2021, following the disruption to the global sporting schedule in 2020 caused by the COVID-19 pandemic, Woodgate was selected for the three-man British men's recurve team competing at the postponed 2020 Summer Olympics in Tokyo, Japan, alongside Patrick Huston and Tom Hall. Great Britain finished 5th in the men's team event, and Woodgate finished 33rd in the men's individual event.

Subsequent to the Games, Woodgate also competed at the 2021 World Archery Youth Championships, in Wrocław, Poland, where he set a new UK junior record of 678/720 for the 70m qualification round, seeding 1st and finishing 9th after matchplay. He was also part of the senior men's recurve team which finished 6th at the 2021 World Archery Championships in Yankton, USA.

In the 2022 season, Woodgate represented Great Britain at both junior events (in the Under 21 age category) as well as at senior events. Competing in the senior category, he attended stages 1, 2, and 3 of the 2022 Archery World Cup. He was part of the men's team which won gold at the 2022 European Youth Championships in Lilleshall, UK.

In 2023, Woodgate competed in the men's individual and men's team events at the 2023 European Games in Kraków, Poland. In the same season, he was also part of the British team which competed at the 2023 World Archery Championships in Berlin, Germany.
