= Archery at the 2020 Summer Olympics – Qualification =

There were 128 qualifying places available for archery at the 2020 Summer Olympics: 64 for women and 64 for men. The qualification standards were released by World Archery in March 2018. The 2020 Summer Olympics were postponed to 2021 due to the COVID-19 pandemic.

Each National Olympic Committee (NOC) is permitted to enter a maximum of six competitors, three per gender. NOCs that qualify teams for a particular gender are able to send a three-member team to the team event and also have each member compete in the individual event. There are 12 team spots for each gender, thus qualifying 36 individuals through team qualification. All other NOCs may earn a maximum of one quota place per gender for the individual events.

Six places are reserved for Japan as the host nation, and a further four will be decided by the Tripartite Commission. The remaining 118 places are then allocated through a qualification process, in which archers earn quota places for their respective NOCs, though not necessarily for themselves.

There is no qualification process prior to the 2020 Games for the mixed team event. Instead, qualification for that event is done through the ranking rounds at the beginning of the Games. Each NOC that has qualified at least one man and one woman will have the scores of that NOC's top-scoring man and top-scoring woman in the ranking round summed; the top 16 NOCs will qualify for mixed team competition.

To be eligible to participate in the Olympic Games after the NOC has obtained a quota place, all archers must have achieved the following minimum qualification score (MQS):

- Men: 70m round of 640
- Women: 70m round of 605

The MQS must have been achieved between the start of the 2019 World Archery Championships and the final entry at a registered World Archery event.

== Qualifying standards ==
Qualification occurs through a hierarchy of events rather than based on dates, so an NOC that earns qualification through an earlier low-priority event might vacate that quota spot if it later earns qualification in a higher-priority event (this particularly affects the Asian Games, held before the World Championships). The priority is (1) World Championships, (2) continental games, (3) continental championships, (4) final qualification tournaments.

The top eight teams in the team event at the World Championships will each qualify a team for the Olympics. If the host, Japan, is one of the top eight, an additional team qualification quota place will be awarded at the Final Team Qualification Tournament. The Final Team Qualification Tournament will fill out the rest of the 12 team quota places, with either three or four teams qualifying depending on whether Japan uses its guaranteed host place or qualifies through competition (including through the Final Team Qualification Tournament itself).

For the mixed team events at continental games, the winning team earns one Olympic quota place per gender.

The top four finishers in the individual event at the World Championships who are not part of one of the eight best teams will qualify. The World Championships will hold ranking brackets as necessary to determine the placing. For Europe, Asia, and the Americas, one quota place each is available through the continental games. All five continents will hold continental qualification tournaments, with specified numbers of quota places available per continent. A Final Individual Qualification Tournament will be held at the end of the qualification period; initially, one quota place is available through that tournament but more may be available if places from other events are not used.

== Timeline ==
Event	Date	Venue
2018 Asian Games	August 18 – September 2, 2018	(Indonesia) Jakarta
2019 World Archery Championships	June 10–16, 2019	(Netherlands) s'-Hertogenbosch
2019 European Games	June 21–30, 2019	(Belarus) Minsk
2019 Pacific Games	July 8–20, 2019	(Samoa) Apia
2019 Pan American Games	July 26 – August 11, 2019	(Peru) Lima
2019 African Games	August 26–30, 2019	(Morocco) Rabat
2019 Asian Archery Championships	November 22–28, 2019	(Thailand) Bangkok
American Continental Qualification Tournament	March 22–28, 2021	(Mexico) Monterrey
~~Oceania Continental Qualification Tournament~~	~~March – April 2021~~	~~(Fiji) Suva~~
2021 European Archery Championships	May 31 – June 6, 2021	(Turkey) Antalya
Final Team Qualification Tournament	June 18–21, 2021	(France) Paris
Final Individual Qualification Tournament	June 18–21, 2021	(France) Paris
Oceania Continental Qualification Tournament^{[c]}	June 18–21, 2021	(France) Paris

== Qualification summary ==
Nation	Men		Women		Mixed	Total
Nation	Individual	Team	Individual	Team	Team	Athletes
Australia	3	Yes	1		Yes	4
Bangladesh	1		1		Yes	2
Belarus			3	Yes		3
Belgium	1					1
Bhutan			1			1
Brazil	1		1		Yes	2
Canada	1		1		Yes	2
Chad	~~1~~		1			1
Chile	1					1
China	3	Yes	3	Yes	Yes	6
Colombia	1		1		Yes	2
Czech Republic			1			1
Denmark			1			1
Ecuador			1			1
Egypt	1		1		Yes	2
Estonia			1			1
Finland	1					1
~~Fiji~~	~~1~~					~~1~~
France	3	Yes	1		Yes	4
Germany	1		3	Yes	Yes	4
Great Britain	3	Yes	3	Yes	Yes	6
Greece			1			1
Hungary	1					1
India	3	Yes	1		Yes	4
Indonesia	3	Yes	1		Yes	4
Iran	1					1
Israel	1					1
Italy	1		3	Yes	Yes	4
~~Ivory Coast~~			~~1~~			~~1~~
Japan	3	Yes	3	Yes	Yes	6
Kazakhstan	3	Yes				3
Luxembourg	1					1
Malaysia	1		1		Yes	2
Malawi	1					1
Mexico	1		3	Yes	Yes	4
Moldova	1		1		Yes	2
Mongolia	1		1		Yes	2
Netherlands	3	Yes	1		Yes	4
~~New Zealand~~	~~1~~		~~1~~		–	~~2~~
~~North Korea~~	~~1~~		~~1~~		–	~~2~~
Poland	1		1		Yes	2
ROC	1		3	Yes	Yes	4
Romania			1			1
Slovakia			1			1
Slovenia	1					1
South Korea	3	Yes	3	Yes	Yes	6
Spain	1		1		Yes	2
Sweden			1			1
Chinese Taipei	3	Yes	3	Yes	Yes	6
Tunisia	1		1		Yes	2
Turkey	1		1		Yes	2
Ukraine	1		3	Yes	Yes	4
United States	3	Yes	3	Yes	Yes	6
Vietnam	1		1		Yes	2
Virgin Islands	1					1
Total: 51 NOCs	64	12	64	12	29	128

== Men's events ==
Event	Location	Athletes per NOC	Total places	Qualified
Team
Host nation	—	3	3	Japan
2019 World Archery Championships	(Netherlands) s'-Hertogenbosch	3	24	Australia; China; Great Britain; India; Kazakhstan; South Korea; Netherlands; Chinese Taipei
Final Qualification Tournament	(France) Paris	3	9	United States; Indonesia; France
Mixed team
2018 Asian Games	(Indonesia) Jakarta	1	0	— ^{[f]}
2019 European Games	(Belarus) Minsk	1	0	— ^{[a]}
2019 Pacific Games	(Samoa) Apia	1	0	~~New Zealand^{[d]}~~
2019 Pan American Games	(Peru) Lima	1	0	— ^{[b]}
2019 African Games	(Morocco) Rabat	1	1	Egypt
Individual
2019 World Archery Championships	(Netherlands) s'-Hertogenbosch	1	3 ^{[e]}	Bangladesh; Italy; Malaysia
2018 Asian Games	(Indonesia) Jakarta	1	0^{[e]}	—
2019 European Games	(Belarus) Minsk	1	1	Spain
2019 Pan American Games	(Peru) Lima	1	2^{[b]}	Brazil; Canada
2019 African Games	(Morocco) Rabat	1	1	~~Chad~~^{[h]} Tunisia
2019 Asian Archery Championships	(Thailand) Bangkok	1	3	Iran; Mongolia; Vietnam
Americas Continental Qualification Tournament	Mexico	1	3	Colombia; Chile; Mexico
Europe Continental Qualification Tournament	(Turkey) Antalya	1	3^{[e]}	Turkey; Slovenia; Germany
2018 Oceania Championships	New Caledonia	1	0	~~Fiji^{[h]}~~
Final Qualification Tournament	(France) Paris	1	7	Finland; Hungary; Israel; Moldova; Poland; ROC; Ukraine
Tripartite Commission	—	1	2	Malawi; Virgin Islands
World Rankings	—	1	2^{[h]}	Belgium; Luxembourg
Total			64	

== Women's events ==
Event	Location	Athletes per NOC	Total places	Qualified
Team
Host nation	—	3	3	Japan
2019 World Archery Championships	(Netherlands) s'-Hertogenbosch	3	24	Belarus; China; Great Britain; Germany; South Korea; ROC; Chinese Taipei; Ukraine
Final Qualification Tournament	(France) Paris	3	9	Mexico; United States; Italy
Mixed team
2018 Asian Games	(Indonesia) Jakarta	1	0	— ^{[f]}
2019 European Games	(Belarus) Minsk	1	0	—^{[g]}
2019 Pacific Games	(Samoa) Apia	1	0	~~New Zealand^{[d]}~~
2019 Pan American Games	(Peru) Lima	1	0	—^{[g]}
2019 African Games	(Morocco) Rabat	1	1	Egypt
Individual
2019 World Archery Championships	(Netherlands) s'-Hertogenbosch	1	3	Denmark; Moldova; Sweden^{[g]}
2018 Asian Games	(Indonesia) Jakarta	1	1	Indonesia
2019 European Games	(Belarus) Minsk	1	1	Netherlands
2019 Pan American Games	(Peru) Lima	1	1	Colombia
2019 African Games	(Morocco) Rabat	1	1	~~Ivory Coast~~^{[h]} Tunisia
2019 Asian Archery Championships	(Thailand) Bangkok	1	3	Bhutan; India; Vietnam
Americas Continental Qualification Tournament	Mexico	1	3	Brazil; Canada; Ecuador
Europe Continental Qualification Tournament	(Turkey) Antalya	1	4	Spain; France; Slovakia; Turkey
2018 Oceania Continental Championships	New Caledonia	1	1	Australia
Final Qualification Tournament	(France) Paris	1	5	Greece; Romania; Poland; Czech Republic; Mongolia
Tripartite Commission	—	1	2	Bangladesh; Chad
World Ranking	—	1	2^{[h]}	Estonia; Malaysia
Total			64	

== Notes ==
- ^{a} According to the qualifying criteria, the highest-ranked mixed team at the 2019 European Games qualified a single place in both genders for the Games. With Italy securing a spot in the men's individual recurve at the 2019 World Archery Championships, only the women's spot was added. Hence, the unused quota place would be awarded to the next highest-ranked archer competing in the men's individual recurve at the Final Qualification Tournament to be held in Paris, France from June 18 to 21, 2021.
- ^{b} The highest-ranked mixed team at the 2019 Pan American Games qualified a single place in both genders for the Games. With the United States securing a spot in the men's individual recurve at the 2019 World Archery Championships, only the women's spot was added. Hence, the unused quota place was awarded to the next highest-ranked archer competing in the men's individual recurve event. With Brazil and Canada the only nations advancing to the semifinals, both of them directly claimed Olympic tickets at the same tournament.
- ^{c} Due to the COVID-19 pandemic in Fiji, the 2021 Oceania Continental Qualification Tournament was canceled. Thus, the highest placing athlete from Oceania in the Final Qualification Tournament at Paris, France will qualify to the Olympics according to the qualification procedure. Since the validity criteria cannot be met, then the result of the last held Continental Championships will be used.
- ^{d} The New Zealand Olympic Committee has declined to accept the men's quota they earned from winning the mixed event at the 2019 Pacific Games, the women's quota will still be used and not removed. Thus, one more quota place is added for the Final Qualification Tournament in the men's individual.
- ^{e} United States, Indonesia, and France qualified for team quotas at the 2021 Final Qualification Tournament in Paris, France, so their quotas at men's individual will be allocated to the archers at the 2021 Final Qualification Tournament.
- ^{f} North Korea withdraw from the Olympic Tournament, so their quotas will be allocated to the archers at the 2021 Final Qualification Tournament.
- ^{g} the United States, Mexico, and Italy have qualified for team quotas at the 2021 Final Qualification Tournament in Paris, France, so their quotas at women's individual will be allocated to the archers at the 2021 Final Qualification Tournament.
- ^{h} Ivory Coast, Chad (men's only), and Fiji failed to reach the required standards by achieving the qualification score (MQS) stated above on the page, although having earned a quota place. Thus these places will then be assigned to the eligible countries according to the world ranking list on 29 June 2021.
