= 2026 European Archery Championships – Men's individual recurve =

Archery competition

Men's individual recurve at the 2026 European Archery Championships
- Venue: Antalya Centennial Archery Field
- Location: Antalya, Turkey
- Dates: 19–24 May
- Competitors: 88 from 34 nations

Medalists
gold medal	Willem Bakker	Netherlands
silver medal	Mauro Nespoli	Italy
bronze medal	Mete Gazoz	Turkey

The men's individual recurve competition at the 2026 European Archery Championships took place from 19 to 24 May in Antalya, Turkey.

== Qualification round ==
Results after 72 arrows.

Rank	Name	Nation	Score	X	10
1	Baptiste Addis	France	688	15	29
2	Mete Gazoz	Turkey	684	18	21
3	Moritz Wieser	Germany	684	16	24
4	Thomas Chirault	France	678	8	24
5	Willem Bakker	Netherlands	676	14	21
6	Mauro Nespoli	Italy	674	14	20
7	Berkay Akkoyun	Turkey	667	10	17
8	Berkim Tümer	Turkey	667	7	21
9	Tsyren Baltakov	AIN	666	14	18
10	Anders Vind Dalsgaard	Denmark	666	10	21
11	Jarno De Smedt	Belgium	666	9	22
12	Mátyás Balogh	Hungary	665	14	16
13	Beligto Tsynguev	AIN	665	8	20
14	Žiga Ravnikar	Slovenia	663	13	19
15	Dan Olaru	Moldova	663	12	17
16	Andrés Temiño	Spain	663	11	18
17	Aldar Tsybikzhapov	AIN	662	8	23
18	Vasil Shahnazaryan	Armenia	662	7	20
19	Patrick Huston	Great Britain	662	3	23
20	Keziah Chabin	Switzerland	661	9	24
21	Matteo Borsani	Italy	660	8	22
22	Mahammadali Aliyev	Azerbaijan	659	8	22
23	Aleksandre Machavariani	Georgia	658	11	19
24	Pablo Acha	Spain	658	6	21
25	Oleksii Hunbin	Ukraine	657	12	16
26	Senna Roos	Netherlands	657	9	18
27	Richard Krejčí	Czech Republic	656	11	16
28	Jonathan Vetter	Germany	655	11	11
29	Jean-Charles Valladont	France	655	9	18
30	Nikodem Marszalik	Poland	655	7	19
31	Federico Musolesi	Italy	655	6	13
32	Ivan Kozhokar	Ukraine	654	11	14
33	Mihajlo Stefanović	Serbia	654	11	13
34	Antti Tekoniemi	Finland	653	7	18
35	Diego Conde	Spain	652	10	17
36	Samo Vrbec	Slovenia	651	9	14
37	Mykhailo Usach	Ukraine	650	7	17
38	Johnny Smart	Great Britain	650	7	16
39	Florian Faber	Switzerland	649	9	18
40	Jérôme Ansel	Luxembourg	649	9	13
41	Oskar Zavasnik	Slovenia	649	8	14
42	Estéban Gilson	Belgium	649	4	14
43	Yaël Smeets	Netherlands	648	6	13
44	Kaj Sjöberg	Sweden	646	6	14
45	Lukas Kurz	Austria	644	5	17
46	Thomas Rufer	Switzerland	644	5	15
47	Alex Sillitoe-Price	Great Britain	642	9	15
48	Matěj Špinar	Czech Republic	641	6	12
49	Anton Tsiareta	Belarus	641	4	16
50	Axel Simons	Belgium	640	6	18
51	Ivan Banchev	Bulgaria	639	8	7
52	Mikołaj Walczyk	Poland	639	7	15
53	Andrei Belici	Moldova	638	8	9
54	Uladzislau Shuliakouski	Belarus	637	6	17
55	Mathias Kramer	Germany	637	4	13
56	Christoffer Bjerendal	Sweden	636	3	16
57	Temur Makievi	Georgia	635	7	10
58	Béla Sipőcz	Hungary	634	8	15
59	Oskar Ronan	Ireland	634	4	18
60	Daviti Basiladze	Georgia	633	6	12
61	Alen Remar	Croatia	633	6	8
62	Markus Nikkanen	Finland	633	2	17
63	Karol Rokita	Poland	632	3	12
64	Stanislav Stamov	Bulgaria	631	3	14
65	Matija Šmaguc	Croatia	629	3	13
66	Oisin Pfetzing Donnellan	Ireland	626	6	7
67	Alexandros Karageorgiou	Greece	625	3	10
68	Romans Sergejevs	Latvia	624	5	10
69	Oliver Soták	Slovakia	622	6	10
70	Ivan Zaikin	Belarus	622	5	6
71	Rasmus Christensen	Denmark	621	7	13
72	Martin Rist	Estonia	621	2	12
73	Holger Svend Vestergaard	Denmark	619	3	9
74	Nurlan Rahimli	Azerbaijan	618	4	11
75	Adam Li	Czech Republic	614	4	11
76	Tero Peltola	Finland	611	3	6
77	Priit Tanvel	Estonia	609	4	11
78	Ondrej Franců	Slovakia	608	4	10
79	Atanas Petrov	Bulgaria	594	2	3
80	Sergiu Sorici	Moldova	590	2	8
81	Gļebs Kononovs	Latvia	583	3	5
82	Peter Borovský	Slovakia	583	2	9
83	Sardar Valiyev	Azerbaijan	582	4	9
84	Carl McCaffrey	Ireland	579	0	6
85	Alo Nurmsalu	Estonia	562	0	4
86	Dilans Gods-Romanovskis	Latvia	554	4	3
87	Ashot Torosyan	Armenia	552	4	3
88	Leonardo Tura	San Marino	534	2	4

== Elimination round ==
=== Finals ===
Quarterfinals
1	(France) Baptiste Addis	7	28	29	29	30	29
8	(Turkey) Berkim Tümer	3	29	25	29	28	28
5	(Netherlands) Willem Bakker	6	26	29	28	30
36	(Slovenia) Samo Vrbec	2	29	25	22	28
51	(Bulgaria) Ivan Banchev	4	27	27	30	29	26
6	(Italy) Mauro Nespoli	6	27	30	27	29	27
7	(Turkey) Berkay Akkoyun	0	28	27	28
2	(Turkey) Mete Gazoz	6	29	29	30

Semifinals
1	(France) Baptiste Addis	4	28	29	28	27	29
5	(Netherlands) Willem Bakker	6	26	30	26	29	30
6	(Italy) Mauro Nespoli	6	29	27	29	26	29
2	(Turkey) Mete Gazoz	4	28	27	29	27	26

Final
5	(Netherlands) Willem Bakker	6	27	28	29	29
6	(Italy) Mauro Nespoli	2	25	29	28	28
Third place
1	(France) Baptiste Addis	2	29	27	28	28
2	(Turkey) Mete Gazoz	6	27	29	29	29

=== Top half ===
==== Section 1 ====
1/48 finals
33	(Serbia) M Stefanović	6	29	26	28	26
80	(Moldova) S Sorici	2	21	25	29	23
81	(Latvia) G Kononovs	1	25	24	21	26
32	(Ukraine) I Kozhokar	7	25	26	28	30
65	(Croatia) M Šmaguc	4	25	26	26	28	25
48	(Czech Republic) M Špinar	6	25	26	29	25	27
49	(Belarus) A Tsiareta	2	27	28	28	24
64	(Bulgaria) S Stamov	6	27	29	28	25

1/24 finals
33	(Serbia) M Stefanović	6	27	26	28	27	28
32	(Ukraine) I Kozhokar	4	26	30	26	28	26
17	(Individual Neutral Athletes) A Tsybikzhapov	6	27	29	29	29
48	(Czech Republic) M Špinar	2	28	27	28	27
64	(Bulgaria) S Stamov	0	28	26	27
16	(Spain) A Temiño	6	29	30	30

1/16 finals
1	(France) B Addis	7	27	27	29	29	29
33	(Serbia) M Stefanović	3	28	27	27	27	28
17	(Individual Neutral Athletes) A Tsybikzhapov	7	27	30	25	28	29
16	(Spain) A Temiño	3	26	27	28	28	28

1/8 finals
1	(France) B Addis	6	28	30	29
17	(Individual Neutral Athletes) A Tsybikzhapov	0	25	28	27

==== Section 2 ====
1/48 finals
57	(Georgia (country)) T Makievi	7	28	25	26	26	27
56	(Sweden) C Bjerendal	3	27	26	26	24	26
41	(Slovenia) O Zavasnik	6	25	29	28	29
72	(Estonia) M Rist	2	28	21	27	25
25	(Ukraine) O Hunbin	6	26	22	26	26
88	(San Marino) L Tura	2	24	28	24	25
73	(Denmark) HS Vestergaard	6	26	26	25	24
40	(Luxembourg) J Ansel	2	25	26	24	24

1/24 finals
9	(Individual Neutral Athletes) T Baltakov	0	27	28	25
57	(Georgia (country)) T Makievi	6	29	29	28
41	(Slovenia) O Zavasnik	4	29	27	27	27	26
24	(Spain) P Acha	6	28	27	27	28	28
25	(Ukraine) O Hunbin	7	23	30	27	27	28
73	(Denmark) HS Vestergaard	3	26	27	25	27	26

1/16 finals
57	(Georgia (country)) T Makievi	4	28	28	28	27	29
24	(Spain) P Acha	6	30	28	27	27	30
25	(Ukraine) O Hunbin	0	28	25	29
8	(Turkey) B Tümer	6	29	27	30

1/8 finals
24	(Spain) P Acha	0	26	27	25
8	(Turkey) B Tümer	6	28	28	27

==== Section 3 ====
1/48 finals
37	(Ukraine) M Usach	6	26	27	29
76	(Finland) T Peltola	0	24	25	26
85	(Estonia) A Nurmsalu	0	24	19	25
28	(Germany) J Vetter	6	29	28	27
69	(Slovakia) O Soták	4	28	26	27	21	27
44	(Sweden) K Sjöberg	6	26	25	28	27	28
53	(Moldova) A Belici	5^{9}	29	26	26	26	26
60	(Georgia (country)) D Basiladze	6^{10}	27	27	28	24	26

1/24 finals
37	(Ukraine) M Usach	2	29	26	26	21
28	(Germany) J Vetter	6	28	30	28	28
21	(Italy) M Borsani	6	28	28	27
44	(Sweden) K Sjöberg	0	27	27	26
60	(Georgia (country)) D Basiladze	6	29	29	28	26	30
12	(Hungary) M Balogh	4	27	28	29	27	23

1/16 finals
5	(Netherlands) W Bakker	6	29	28	29	28
28	(Germany) J Vetter	2	29	28	26	25
21	(Italy) M Borsani	6	28	28	27	29	29
60	(Georgia (country)) D Basiladze	4	28	28	30	27	18

1/8 finals
5	(Netherlands) W Bakker	7	29	28	29	29	28
21	(Italy) M Borsani	3	30	28	27	28	27

==== Section 4 ====
1/48 finals
61	(Croatia) A Remar	6	28	25	27	25
52	(Poland) M Walczyk	2	24	28	26	22
45	(Austria) L Kurz	6	29	28	26	28
68	(Latvia) R Sergejevs	2	25	27	27	26
29	(France) JC Valladont	6	27	28	27
84	(Republic of Ireland) C McCaffrey	0	26	27	26
77	(Estonia) P Tanvel	0	25	25	25
36	(Slovenia) S Vrbec	6	28	26	29

1/24 finals
13	(Individual Neutral Athletes) B Tsynguev	4	28	26	26	28	28
61	(Croatia) A Remar	6	29	29	24	27	29
45	(Austria) L Kurz	2	28	27	26	29
20	(Switzerland) K Chabin	6	28	28	28	29
29	(France) JC Valladont	4	28	28	26	28	28
36	(Slovenia) S Vrbec	6	27	30	27	27	29

1/16 finals
61	(Croatia) A Remar	6	29	28	30	27
20	(Switzerland) K Chabin	2	30	26	28	25
36	(Slovenia) S Vrbec	6	28	29	29	28
4	(France) T Chirault	2	30	28	28	27

1/8 finals
61	(Croatia) A Remar	2	27	23	28	28
36	(Slovenia) S Vrbec	6	27	28	28	30

=== Bottom half ===
==== Section 5 ====
1/48 finals
35	(Spain) D Conde	6	28	28	28
78	(Slovakia) O Franců	0	25	24	27
83	(Azerbaijan) S Valiyev	3	25	25	22	23	24
30	(Poland) N Marszalik	7	24	27	28	23	26
67	(Greece) A Karageorgiou	2	24	26	27	24
46	(Switzerland) T Rufer	6	30	27	25	26
51	(Bulgaria) I Banchev	6	27	27	28	28	28
62	(Finland) M Nikkanen	4	29	26	28	25	28

1/24 finals
35	(Spain) D Conde	6	30	28	28	26
30	(Poland) N Marszalik	2	28	30	27	24
19	(United Kingdom) P Huston	6	29	29	26	26	28
46	(Switzerland) T Rufer	4	27	29	27	25	28
51	(Bulgaria) I Banchev	6	24	26	26	29	29
14	(Slovenia) Ž Ravnikar	4	27	24	27	27	28

1/16 finals
3	(Germany) M Wieser	4	28	25	28	29	28
35	(Spain) D Conde	6	29	25	25	30	28
19	(United Kingdom) P Huston	4	27	27	19	29	28
51	(Bulgaria) I Banchev	6	25	28	25	27	29

1/8 finals
35	(Spain) D Conde	5^{8}	28	25	25	26	25
51	(Bulgaria) I Banchev	6^{10}	25	28	27	25	25

==== Section 6 ====
1/48 finals
59	(Republic of Ireland) O Ronan	3	25	28	27	24	29
54	(Belarus) U Shuliakouski	7	26	24	27	28	30
43	(Netherlands) Y Smeets	6	27	26	27	27
70	(Belarus) I Zaikin	2	26	27	26	23
27	(Czech Republic) R Krejčí	6	27	27	25
86	(Latvia) D Gods-Romanovskis	0	25	22	21
75	(Czech Republic) A Li	2	27	29	25	25
38	(United Kingdom) J Smart	6	29	28	28	26

1/24 finals
11	(Belgium) J De Smedt	6	27	28	30
54	(Belarus) U Shuliakouski	0	25	26	26
43	(Netherlands) Y Smeets	0	27	28	24
22	(Azerbaijan) M Aliyev	6	29	29	26
27	(Czech Republic) R Krejčí	4	27	29	29	27	27
38	(United Kingdom) J Smart	6	28	29	29	26	30

1/16 finals
11	(Belgium) J De Smedt	6	29	29	29
22	(Azerbaijan) M Aliyev	0	25	27	27
38	(United Kingdom) J Smart	2	26	27	28	25
6	(Italy) M Nespoli	6	29	26	29	30

1/8 finals
11	(Belgium) J De Smedt	2	28	25	28	26
6	(Italy) M Nespoli	6	29	28	27	29

==== Section 7 ====
1/48 finals
39	(Switzerland) F Faber	6	26	27	25	28
74	(Azerbaijan) N Rahimli	2	24	23	28	21
87	(Armenia) A Torosyan	0	21	11	19
26	(Netherlands) S Roos	6	27	28	29
71	(Denmark) R Christensen	6	26	28	27	27
42	(Belgium) E Gilson	2	24	26	27	27
55	(Germany) M Kramer	6^{9}	27	27	27	26	30
58	(Hungary) B Sipőcz	5^{8}	26	28	21	29	30

1/24 finals
39	(Switzerland) F Faber	2	24	27	30	24
26	(Netherlands) S Roos	6	26	29	28	26
23	(Georgia (country)) A Machavariani	6	27	27	29	28
71	(Denmark) R Christensen	2	30	26	26	25
55	(Germany) M Kramer	6	28	28	27	29
10	(Denmark) AV Dalsgaard	2	27	29	26	25

1/16 finals
7	(Turkey) B Akkoyun	7	29	29	29	26	29
26	(Netherlands) S Roos	3	28	28	29	29	27
23	(Georgia (country)) A Machavariani	6	28	30	29	25	28
55	(Germany) M Kramer	4	28	27	28	27	28

1/8 finals
7	(Turkey) B Akkoyun	6	28	30	26	27	29
23	(Georgia (country)) A Machavariani	4	27	29	27	28	28

==== Section 8 ====
1/48 finals
63	(Poland) K Rokita	6^{10}	26	24	27	21	29
50	(Belgium) A Simons	5^{6}	26	26	21	28	26
47	(United Kingdom) A Sillitoe-Price	6	28	26	29	26	26
66	(Republic of Ireland) O Pfetzing Donnellan	4	27	27	26	26	26
31	(Italy) F Musolesi	6	28	26	27	26
82	(Slovakia) P Borovský	2	21	27	26	23
79	(Bulgaria) A Petrov	0	25	24	25
34	(Finland) A Tekoniemi	6	29	27	28

1/24 finals
15	(Moldova) D Olaru	5^{8}	27	25	28	27	28
63	(Poland) K Rokita	6^{10}	28	27	27	27	26
47	(United Kingdom) A Sillitoe-Price	6	26	28	26	28
18	(Armenia) V Shahnazaryan	2	26	27	25	28
31	(Italy) F Musolesi	7	28	30	29	29
34	(Finland) A Tekoniemi	1	27	28	29	27

1/16 finals
63	(Poland) K Rokita	0	23	25	26
47	(United Kingdom) A Sillitoe-Price	6	28	28	29
31	(Italy) F Musolesi	2	26	27	30	28
2	(Turkey) M Gazoz	6	27	28	29	30

1/8 finals
47	(United Kingdom) A Sillitoe-Price	1	27	29	27	27
2	(Turkey) M Gazoz	7	27	30	29	28
