= Halliford School =

School in Shepperton, Surrey, England

Location
- Russell Road; Shepperton, Surrey, TW17 9HX; England; 51.39025°N 0.44462°W

Information
- Type: Private day school
- Motto: Via firma ad firmiora A firm path to firmer things
- Religious affiliations: Church of England; Anglicanism
- Established: 1921
- Local authority: Surrey
- Department for Education URN: 125411 Tables
- Chair: Ken Woodward
- Headmaster: Dr Millan Sachania (Autumn Term 2026), Mr Richard Amlot (From January 2027)
- Gender: Boys (and Girls)
- Age: 11 to 18 (16 - 18)
- Enrolment: 500
- Houses: Wadham; Russell; Greville; Desborough
- Colours: Red, Green, Blue and Gold
- Publication: The Hallifordian
- Website: www.hallifordschool.co.uk

Halliford School is a selective boys private day school, which also admits girls into its sixth form, in Lower Halliford, Shepperton, Surrey, England. The school is a member of the Headmasters' and Headmistresses' Conference (HMC). The current Headmaster is Dr Millan Sachania for the Autumn Term 2026, with Richard Amlot joining Halliford from King's College School, Wimbledon in January 2027. Former pupils of the school are known as "Old Hallifordians". The school's grounds are situated on the edge of Spelthorne, providing access from London, the major airports, the M25, M3, and M4 motorways.

== History ==
The building closest to its road is the oldest, a tall-storied Georgian House set in 6 acres (2.4 ha) beside the River Thames that was once home to Emma Hart (later Emma, Lady Hamilton) when she lived with Charles Francis Greville before she married and then became Lord Nelson's mistress..

The school has seen expansion since the year 2000 including the following buildings:

- Professional theatre and separate dining hall
- Arts and technology building
- Sixth form centre and library
- Multi-purpose sports hall, separate gymnasium and climbing wall
- New English and History classrooms and library
- Refurbished Theatre building
- New Dining hall

The fourth house was also added during this time, and additional sports fields were purchased.

Following a 2007 consortium with the now-closed St David's School for Girls, Halliford School admits girls from the age of 16.

== Amenities and curriculum ==
Sports and athletics are significant throughout the year groups. Boys from the school have played sports such as rugby, cricket and basketball to the highest level. A major portion of alumni play for teams in or compete as individuals in rugby, cricket, football, badminton, rowing, athletics and/or golf at university, local or workplace clubs. The inspectorate reports students are known by the staff who all provide major support outside of the school timetable. A broad co-curricular programme runs and ambitious, frequent overseas trips: academic, charity project based or sporting.

In early years the curriculum is broad with pupils exposed to a wide range of subjects to help them acquire a sound foundation of basic skills. Students at Halliford follow a broad curriculum through to GCSE, choosing from a wide range of subjects including English, mathematics, sciences, languages, humanities, arts, drama, design and technology, and computer science. A-level courses can be taken in 25 non-vocational subjects: in the arts, languages, technologies and sciences.

Numerous co-curricular and student-organised clubs and societies include: a current affairs circle, a reading circle to encourage creative writing and a stage production technicians' group. Competitions and performances are led by staff and sixth form pupils annually in junior and senior debating, theatre and music. External distinguished speakers give talks and presentations.

== School badge, motto and houses ==
The school badge was designed in 1986 at the request of the Headmaster, John Crook, by his Deputy Head, John Mitchell. The blue chevron represents the Halliford Bend in the River Thames where the School is situated. The origin of the word Halliford as derived from HOLY FORD is represented by the gold bar, or pallet (stripe), at the apex of the chevron. The two gold crosses were copied from the finials of the churchwardens' staves in the parish church of St Nicholas, Shepperton, within which parish the School stands. VADUM SANCTUM inscribed on the open book (for Education) is the Latin for "Holy Ford", and picks up the tradition that Julius Caesar crossed the Thames by way of an ancient ford hereabouts, and that in later Christian times a holy man or hermit lived at the end of Manygate Lane, close by the ancient crossing point. The crest depicts a Holy Lamb couchant, illustrating the close links with Shepperton (Sheep Town). The Motto, VIA FIRMA AD FIRMIORA, translates roughly as A FIRM PATH TO FIRMER THINGS. It represents the School's aim to guide its pupils through the uncertain and turbulent waters of adolescence to the steadier ground of young manhood.

The school is divided into four houses:

- Wadham (/ˈwɒdəm/ WOD-əm) (Note: Rev. J.F. (William) Russell of Shepperton is listed as a member of the Oxford Architectural Society also known as the Oxford Society for the Promoting of Gothic Architecture in 1849-1856, a graduate of Wadham College, Oxford)
- Russell (Note: Rev. William Russell, rector of Shepperton 1817-70, lived at The Rectory and took an active part in local affairs, including the levelling and straightening of the riverside road, thereafter named Russell Road. It was afterwards contrasted by a local topographer that when he started his work among the parishioners they had 'by all accounts had for some time been living in great darkness...')
- Greville (Note: Named after Charles Francis Greville, see History.)
- Desborough (Note: William Grenfell, created Lord Desborough obtained funding for and planned Desborough Island opposite the school and commissioned other major engineering projects on the River Thames, President of the Thames Conservancy, who lived at Taplow Court in Buckinghamshire, he was an athlete, sportsman, public servant and politician.)

The house colours are red, green, blue and gold respectively, reflected in school ties and inter-house sports kit.

Financial support in the form of bursaries is provided for some of the school’s pupils.

== Old Hallifordians ==
Alumni of Halliford school are known as Old Hallifordians or OHs.

Societies for former pupils include The Old Hallifordian Society. The Old Hallifordian Society is the alumni organisation for the school and was founded to further the interests of the school and its past and present members. Alumni become life members of the Society when they leave the school. The Old Hallifordian Society encourages interaction between members, strengthening ties between OHs and the school.

Old Hallifordians include old boys (and girls) in various professions, including Victoria Cross recipients, military officers, clergymen and politicians.

== Notable alumni ==
- Actor Mark Lester
- Olympic Gold medalist Steve Trapmore (rowing)
- Olympian Toby Penty (badminton)
- Olympian James Woodgate (archery)
- Paralympian Oliver Stanhope (rowing)
- Welsh Rugby Union player Rhodri Williams
- Commonwealth Games Silver medalist Ashley Bryant (decathlon)

== Assessment ==
The school is inspected by the ISI rather than Ofsted. Inspections are carried out under Section 162A(1)(b) of the Education Act 2002 as amended by the Education Act 2005 under which the Secretary of State accredits the ISI as a qualified inspectorate body.

In their latest inspection, Halliford School was awarded a significant strength for pupil leadership.

Percentage of students achieving 5+ 9-4 GCSEs (or equivalent) including English and maths	2023	2024	2025
School	96%	99%	98.2%
Local Authority	74%	74%	70.1%
England	67.8%	67.4	59.3%

During the 2025/26 UCAS cycle 98% of our students have secured their chosen university.

In 2026 Halliford achieved its highest-ever percentage of GCSE grade 7-9 results which was 57%, significantly above the national average for independent schools.

== Notes and references ==
Notes
