= Finland at the 2020 Summer Olympics =

- IOC code: FIN
- NOC: Finnish Olympic Committee
- Website: olympiakomitea.fi (in Finnish and Swedish)

in Tokyo, Japan July 23, 2021 – August 8, 2021
- Competitors: 45 in 11 sports
- Flag bearers (opening): Satu Mäkelä-Nummela; Ari-Pekka Liukkonen
- Flag bearer (closing): Mira Potkonen
- Medals Ranked 85th: Gold 0 Silver 0 Bronze 2 Total 2

Summer Olympics appearances (overview)
- 1908; 1912; 1920; 1924; 1928; 1932; 1936; 1948; 1952; 1956; 1960; 1964; 1968; 1972; 1976; 1980; 1984; 1988; 1992; 1996; 2000; 2004; 2008; 2012; 2016; 2020; 2024

Other related appearances
- 1906 Intercalated Games

Finland competed at the 2020 Summer Olympics in Tokyo. Originally scheduled to take place from 24 July to 9 August 2020, the Games were postponed to 23 July to 8 August 2021, because of the COVID-19 pandemic. Finnish athletes have appeared in every edition of the Summer Olympic Games since the nation's official debut in 1908. Finland left the 2020 Summer Olympics with two bronze medals; its last Summer Olympic gold medal was won in the 2008 Games.

== Medalists ==
Medal	Name	Sport	Event	Date
Bronze	Matti Mattsson	Swimming	Men's 200 m breaststroke	29 July
Bronze	Mira Potkonen	Boxing	Women's lightweight	5 August

== Competitors ==
The following is the list of number of competitors in the Games.

Sport	Men	Women	Total
Archery	1	0	1
Athletics	9	12	21
Badminton	1	0	1
Boxing	0	1	1
Equestrian	1	0	1
Golf	2	2	4
Sailing	2	3	5
Shooting	2	1	3
Skateboarding	0	1	1
Swimming	2	3	5
Wrestling	2	0	2
Total	22	23	45

== Archery ==
One Finnish archer directly qualified for the men's individual recurve at the Games by reaching the quarterfinal stage and obtaining one of seven available spots at the 2021 Final Qualification Tournament in Paris, France.

Athlete	Event	Ranking round		Round of 64	Round of 32	Round of 16	Quarterfinals	Semifinals	Final / BM	
Athlete	Event	Score	Seed	Opposition Score	Opposition Score	Opposition Score	Opposition Score	Opposition Score	Opposition Score	Rank
Antti Vikström	Men's individual	649	45	Mohamad (MAS); L 5–6	Did not advance					

== Athletics ==
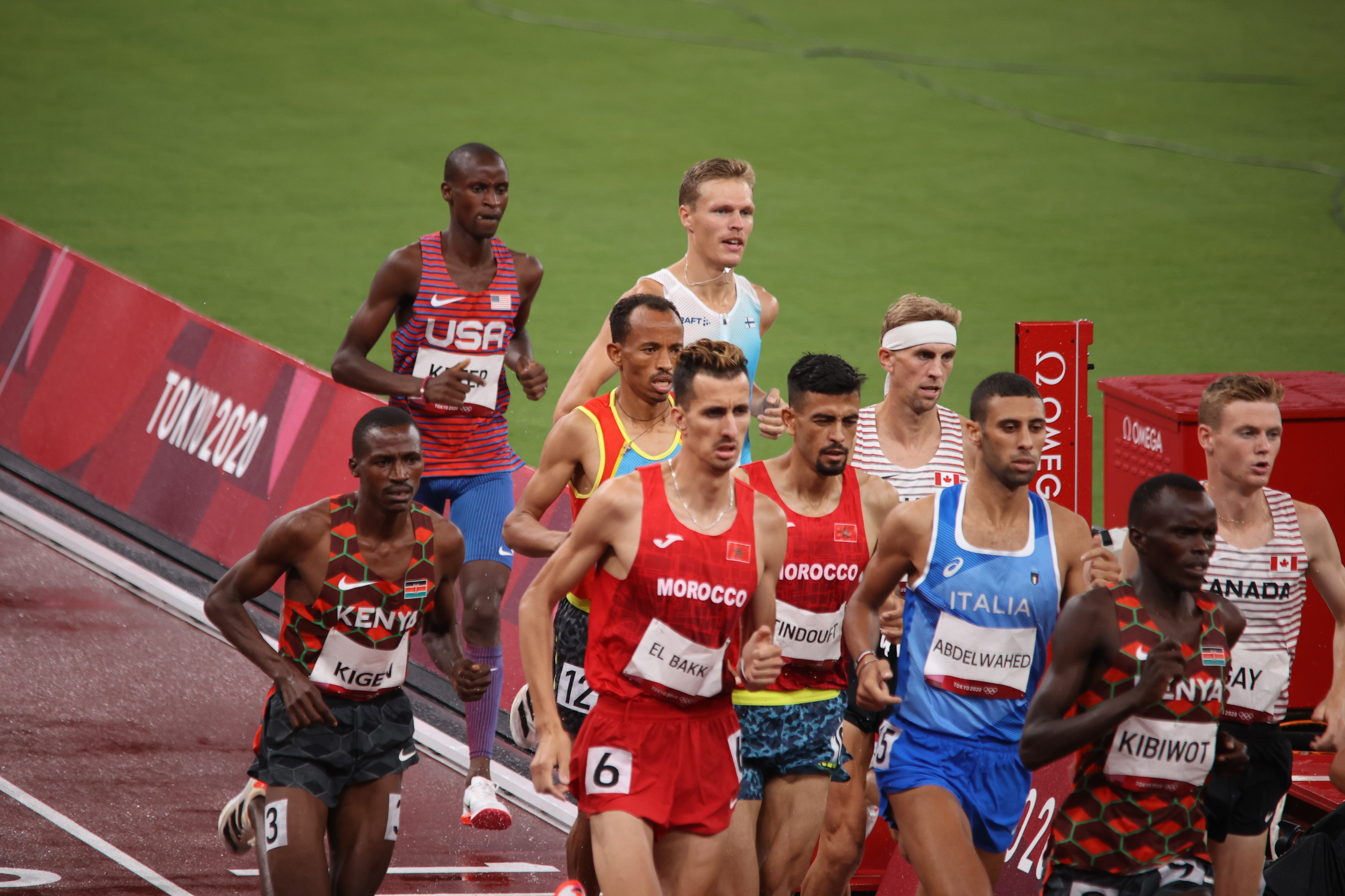
Topi Raitanen in the men's 3000 m steeplechase finals

Finnish athletes further achieved the entry standards, either by qualifying time or by world ranking, in the following track and field events (up to a maximum of 3 athletes in each event):

Key

- Note–Ranks given for track events are within the athlete's heat only
- Q = Qualified for the next round
- q = Qualified for the next round as a fastest loser or, in field events, by position without achieving the qualifying target
- NR = National record
- N/A = Round not applicable for the event
- Bye = Athlete not required to compete in round

Track and road events
Men

Athlete	Event	Heat		Semifinal		Final	
Athlete	Event	Result	Rank	Result	Rank	Result	Rank
Elmo Lakka	110 m hurdles	13.48	5 'q	13.67	7	Did not advance	
Topi Raitanen	3000 m steeplechase	8:19.17 SB	2 Q	—N/a		8:17.44 SB	8
Jarkko Kinnunen	50 km walk	—N/a				4:04:28	26
Aleksi Ojala	50 km walk	—N/a				4:14:02	38
Aku Partanen	50 km walk	—N/a				3:52:39 SB	9

Women

Athlete	Event	Heat		Semifinal		Final	
Athlete	Event	Result	Rank	Result	Rank	Result	Rank
Sara Kuivisto	800 m	2:00.15 NR	4 q	1:59.41 NR	6	Did not advance	
Sara Kuivisto	1500 m	4:04.10 NR	4 Q	4:02.35 NR	7	Did not advance	
Reetta Hurske	100 m hurdles	13.10	6	Did not advance			
Annimari Korte	100 m hurdles	13.06	5	Did not advance			
Viivi Lehikoinen	400 m hurdles	55.67	5	Did not advance			

Field events
Men

Athlete	Event	Qualification		Final	
Athlete	Event	Distance	Position	Distance	Position
Kristian Pulli	Long jump	7.96	12 q	7.92	9
Lassi Etelätalo	Javelin throw	84.50	5 Q	83.28	8
Oliver Helander	Javelin throw	78.81	17	Did not advance	
Toni Kuusela	Javelin throw	76.96	26	Did not advance	

Women

Athlete	Event	Qualification		Final	
Athlete	Event	Distance	Position	Distance	Position
Kristiina Mäkelä	Triple jump	14.21	12 q	14.17	11
Senni Salminen	Triple jump	14.20	13	Did not advance	
Ella Junnila	High jump	1.86	=22	Did not advance	
Elina Lampela	Pole vault	NM	–	Did not advance	
Wilma Murto	Pole vault	4.55	=8 q	4.50	=5
Silja Kosonen	Hammer throw	70.49	14	Did not advance	
Krista Tervo	Hammer throw	NM	—	Did not advance	

Combined event – Women's heptathlon

Athlete	Event	100H	HJ	SP	200 m	LJ	JT	800 m	Total	Rank
Maria Huntington	Result	13.20	1.80	12.49	24.50	6.10	42.91	2:19.28	6135	17
Maria Huntington	Points	1094	978	694	933	880	723	833	6135	17

== Badminton ==
Finland entered one male badminton player into the Olympic tournament. Kalle Koljonen, the 2021 European Championships bronze medalists, secured a spot at the Games after finished 28th in the BWF World Race to Tokyo Rankings. Airi Mikkelä who qualified to compete at the Games in the women's singles declined the invitation after she has decided to retire in July 2020.

Athlete	Event	Group stage			Elimination	Quarterfinal	Semifinal	Final / BM	
Athlete	Event	Opposition Score	Opposition Score	Rank	Opposition Score	Opposition Score	Opposition Score	Opposition Score	Rank
Kalle Koljonen	Men's singles	Wraber (AUT); W (21–13, 21–17)	Axelsen (DEN); L (9–21, 13–21)	2	Did not advance				

== Boxing ==
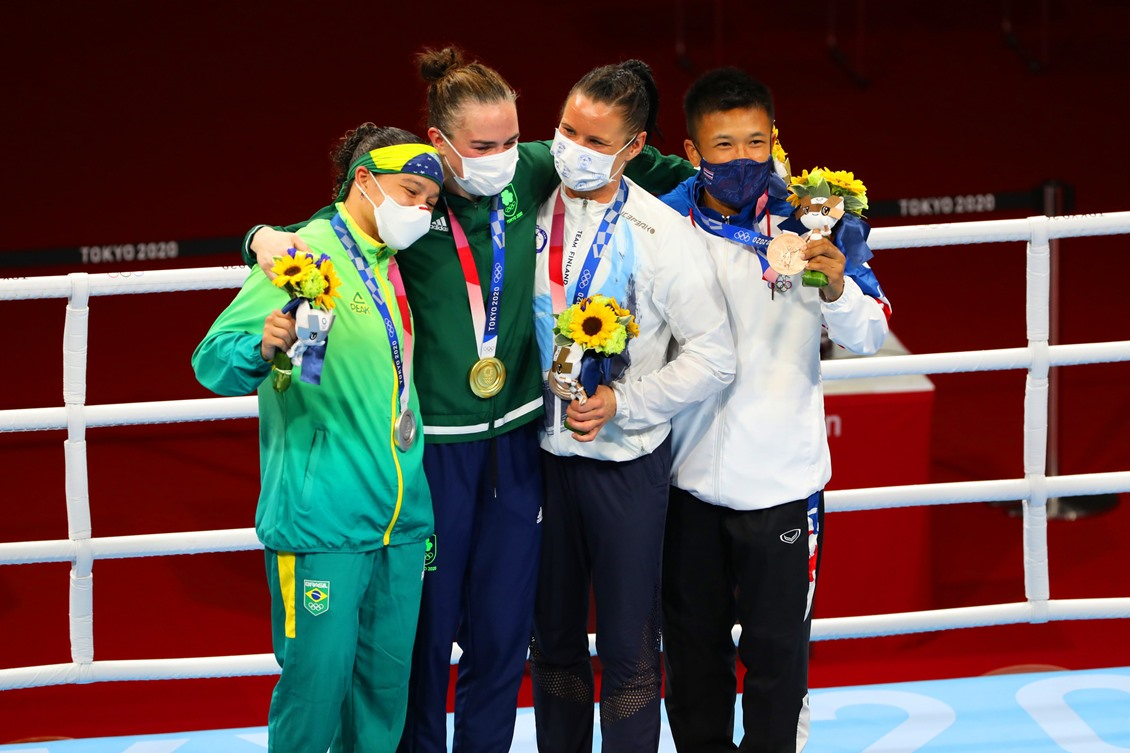
Mira Potkonen and others women's lightweight medalists

Finland entered one female boxer into the Olympic tournament. Mira Potkonen in the women's lightweight)qualified by topping the list of eligible boxers from Europe in her weight division of the IOC's Boxing Task Force Rankings.

Athlete	Event	Round of 32	Round of 16	Quarterfinals	Semifinals	Final	
Athlete	Event	Opposition Result	Opposition Result	Opposition Result	Opposition Result	Opposition Result	Rank
Mira Potkonen	Women's lightweight	Hamadouche (FRA); W 3–1	Oh Y-j (KOR); W 4–1	Yıldız (TUR); W 3–2	Ferreira (BRA); L 0–5	Did not advance	3rd place, bronze medalist(s)

== Equestrian ==
Finland entered one dressage rider into the Olympic equestrian competition, by finishing in the top two, outside the group selection, of the individual FEI Olympic Rankings for Group A (North Western Europe).

=== Dressage ===
Athlete	Horse	Event	Grand Prix		Grand Prix Freestyle		Overall	
Athlete	Horse	Event	Score	Rank	Technical	Artistic	Score	Rank
Henri Ruoste	Kontestro	Individual	64.674	52	Did not advance			

Qualification Legend: Q = Qualified for the final; q = Qualified for the final as a lucky loser

== Golf ==
Finland entered two male and two female golfers into the Olympic tournament.

Athlete	Event	Round 1	Round 2	Round 3	Round 4	Total		
Athlete	Event	Score	Score	Score	Score	Score	Par	Rank
Kalle Samooja	Men's	75	68	70	67	280	−4	=45
Sami Välimäki	Men's	70	70	68	67	275	−9	=27
Matilda Castren	Women's	68	70	68	70	276	−8	=18
Sanna Nuutinen	Women's	70	68	69	70	277	−7	=20

== Sailing ==
Finnish sailors qualified one boat in each of the following classes through the 2018 Sailing World Championships, the class-associated Worlds, and the continental regattas.

On 12 December 2019, windsurfer and London 2012 silver medalist Tuuli Petäjä-Sirén and Rio 2016 Laser sailor Kaarle Tapper were officially nominated to the Finnish roster for the Games, with two-time Olympian Tuula Tenkanen (women's Laser Radial) joining the squad more than a year later. Nacra 17 sailors Sinem Kurtbay and Akseli Keskinen completed the lineup on April 21, 2021, as the former's original partner Janne Järvinen handed a prison sentence for money laundering and drug offenses.

Athlete	Event	Race													Net points	Final rank
Athlete	Event	1	2	3	4	5	6	7	8	9	10	11	12	M*	Net points	Final rank
Kaarle Tapper	Men's Laser	2	3	14	11	8	29	~~36~~	8	6	12	—N/a		16	109	9
Tuuli Petäjä-Sirén	Women's RS:X	11	15	18	6	11	13	10	11	12	~~22~~	12	11	EL	130	14
Tuula Tenkanen	Women's Laser Radial	9	6	14	~~33~~	5	3	6	3	32	9	—N/a		8	95	5
Akseli Keskinen; Sinem Kurtbay	Mixed Nacra 17	16	9	~~19~~	13	14	9	18	8	12	11	9	12	EL	131	13

M = Medal race; EL = Eliminated – did not advance into the medal race

== Shooting ==
Finnish shooters achieved quota places for the following events by virtue of their best finishes at the 2018 ISSF World Championships, the 2019 ISSF World Cup series, European Championships or Games, and European Qualifying Tournament, if they obtained a minimum qualifying score (MQS) by June 6, 2021.

Athlete	Event	Qualification		Final	
Athlete	Event	Points	Rank	Points	Rank
Eetu Kallioinen	Men's skeet	123	3 Q	36	4
Lari Pesonen	Men's skeet	114	28	Did not advance	
Satu Mäkelä-Nummela	Women's trap	113	24	Did not advance	

== Skateboarding ==
Finland entered one skateboarder into the Olympic tournament. Lizzie Armanto was automatically selected among the top 16 eligible skateboarders in the women's park based on the World Skate Olympic Rankings of June 30, 2021.

Athlete	Event	Qualification		Final	
Athlete	Event	Result	Rank	Result	Rank
Lizzie Armanto	Women's park	30.01	14	Did not advance	

== Swimming ==
Finnish swimmers achieved qualifying standards in the following events (up to a maximum of 2 swimmers in each event at the Olympic Qualifying Time (OQT), and potentially 1 at the Olympic Selection Time (OST)):

On 12 December 2019, breaststroke swimmer and 2013 world bronze medalist Matti Mattsson was officially nominated to the Finnish roster for his third consecutive Games, with rookie Ida Hulkko (women's 100 m breaststroke) and eventual European champion Ari-Pekka Liukkonen (men's 50 m freestyle) achieving the A-standard to join Mattsson in the pool for the rescheduled Games.

Athlete	Event	Heat		Semifinal		Final	
Athlete	Event	Time	Rank	Time	Rank	Time	Rank
Ari-Pekka Liukkonen	Men's 50 m freestyle	22.25	=26	Did not advance			
Ari-Pekka Liukkonen	Men's 100 m freestyle	50.48	46	Did not advance			
Matti Mattsson	Men's 100 m breaststroke	1:00.02	21	Did not advance			
Matti Mattsson	Men's 200 m breaststroke	2:08.44	3 Q	2:08.22	5 Q	2:07.13	3rd place, bronze medalist(s)
Ida Hulkko	Women's 100 m breaststroke	1:06.19	7 Q	1:07.02	12	Did not advance	
Mimosa Jallow	Women's 100 m backstroke	1:00.06	17	Did not advance			
Fanny Teijonsalo	Women's 50 m freestyle	24.77	17 Q	24.91	15	Did not advance	
Fanny Teijonsalo	Women's 100 m freestyle	54.69	23	Did not advance			

== Wrestling ==
Finland qualified two wrestlers for each of the following classes into the Olympic competition. One of them granted an Olympic license by advancing to the top two finals of the men's Greco-Roman 97 kg at the 2021 European Qualification Tournament in Budapest, Hungary, while another Finnish wrestler claimed one of the remaining slots in the men's Greco-Roman 130 kg at the 2021 World Qualification Tournament in Sofia, Bulgaria.

Key:

- VT (ranking points: 5–0 or 0–5) – Victory by fall.
- VB (ranking points: 5–0 or 0–5) – Victory by injury (VF for forfeit, VA for withdrawal or disqualification)
- PP (ranking points: 3–1 or 1–3) – Decision by points – the loser with technical points.
- PO (ranking points: 3–0 or 0–3) – Decision by points – the loser without technical points.
- ST (ranking points: 4–0 or 0–4) – Great superiority – the loser without technical points and a margin of victory of at least 8 (Greco-Roman) or 10 (freestyle) points.
- SP (ranking points: 4–1 or 1–4) – Technical superiority – the loser with technical points and a margin of victory of at least 8 (Greco-Roman) or 10 (freestyle) points.

Greco-Roman

Athlete	Event	Round of 16	Quarterfinal	Semifinal	Repechage	Final / BM	
Athlete	Event	Opposition Result	Opposition Result	Opposition Result	Opposition Result	Opposition Result	Rank
Arvi Savolainen	Men's −97 kg	Rosillo (CUB); W 3–1 ^{PP}	Aleksanyan (ARM); L 1–3 ^{PP}	Did not advance	Dzhuzupbekov (KGZ); W 3–1 ^{PP}	Saravi (IRI); L 1–3 ^{PP}	5
Elias Kuosmanen	Men's −130 kg	Kajaia (GEO); L 0–5 ^{VT}	Did not advance		Semenov (ROC); L 0–4 ^{ST}	Did not advance	16

== See also ==
- Finland at the 2020 Summer Paralympics
