= Gijs Broeksma =

Dutch archer (born 1999)

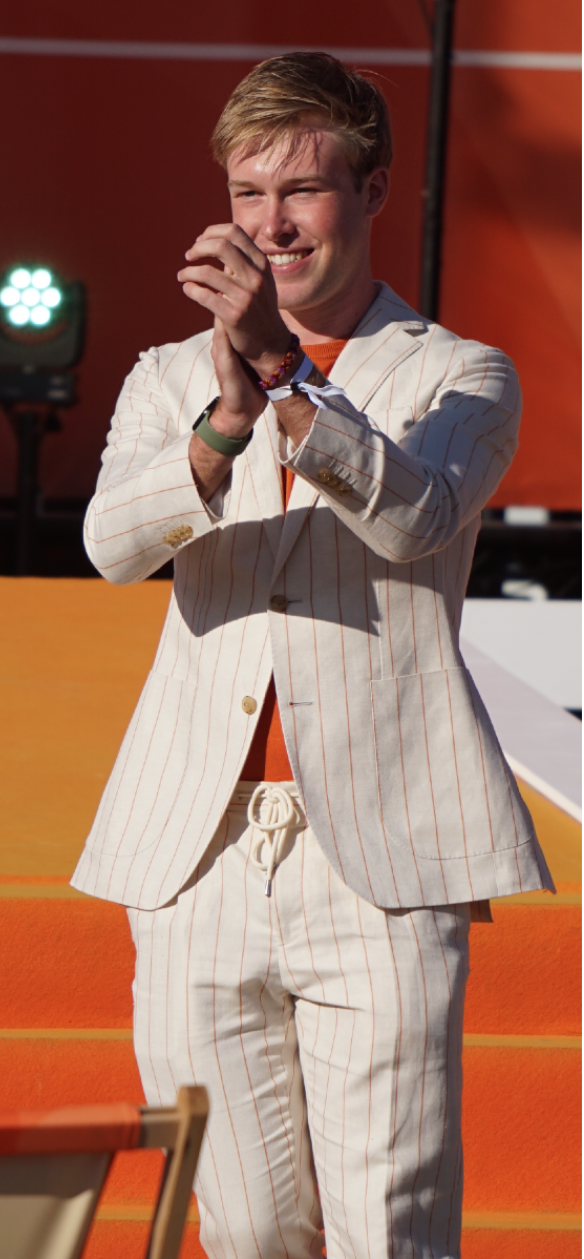

Personal information
- Born: 10 December 1999 (age 25); Amsterdam, Netherlands

Sport
- Country: Netherlands
- Sport: Archery
- Event: Recurve
- Coached by: Ron van der Hoff

Gijs Broeksma (born 10 December 1999) is a Dutch archer. He competes in recurve archery and is right-handed.

He competed in Archery at the 2020 Summer Olympics where he as a part of Dutch team reached fourth place together with his teammates Sjef van den Berg en Steve Wijler. In the individual tournament he reached 14th place in qualifications. Broeksma won in the knock-out phase and the 32nd finals but eventually lost in 16th finals after a shoot-off with 6-5 from de Takaharu Furukawa of Japan.

Broeksma was raised in Ruinen, Netherlands and currently lives in Arnhem where he trains at National Sports Centre Papendal.
