= Mátyás Balogh =

Hungarian archer (born 1999)

Personal information
- Nationality: Hungarian
- Born: 5 October 1999 (age 25)

Sport
- Sport: Archery

Mátyás László Balogh (born 5 October 1999) is a Hungarian archer. He competed in the men's individual event at the 2020 Summer Olympics. He was the first archer to represent Hungary at the Olympics since Judit Kovács and Tímea Kiss took part at the 1996 Summer Olympics in Atlanta.

== Biography ==
As a child, Balogh also played football and took up karate. He took up archery at the age of eight after seeing a demonstration of the sport at a local carnival in Szombathely. After joining a local club, he became part of the Hungarian Archery Association in 2012. Balogh is also a member of the Hungarian Armed Forces and competes as a full-time military athlete, where he holds the rank of section leader of the Sports Squadron.

In June 2021, Balogh qualified for the 2020 Summer Olympics in Tokyo via one of the seven quota places in the final qualification tournament. However, at the Olympics, Balogh was eliminated in the first round of the tournament. Overall, he was ranked in 61st place, out of a field of 64 competitors. Despite the early elimination, Balogh said he was proud to represent Hungary at the Olympics after a gap of 25 years, and he was looking forward to the 2024 Summer Olympics in Paris.
