= Antti Vikström =

Finnish archer (born 1993)

Personal information
- Nationality: Finnish
- Born: 15 January 1993 (age 32)

Sport
- Sport: Archery

Antti Vikström (born 15 January 1993) is a Finnish archer. He competed in the men's individual event at the 2020 Summer Olympics.
