= Archery at the 2022 Asian Games – Men's individual recurve =

Men's individual recurve at the 2022 Asian Games
- Venue: Fuyang Yinhu Sports Centre
- Dates: 1–7 October 2023
- Competitors: 84 from 29 nations

Medalists
gold medal	Baatarkhuyagiin Otgonbold	Mongolia
silver medal	Qi Xiangshuo	China
bronze medal	Lee Woo-seok	South Korea

The men's individual recurve archery competition at the 2022 Asian Games was held from 1 to 7 October 2023 at Fuyang Yinhu Sports Centre.

A total of 84 archers participated in the ranking round. Only the top two archers from each country were allowed to progress to the knockout stage.

== Schedule ==
All times are China Standard Time (UTC+08:00)

Date	Time	Event
Sunday, 1 October 2023	09:00	Qualification round
Monday, 2 October 2023	15:25	1/32 eliminations
Monday, 2 October 2023	16:45	1/16 eliminations
Monday, 2 October 2023	17:15	1/8 eliminations
Tuesday, 3 October 2023	14:20	Quarterfinals
Tuesday, 3 October 2023	16:20	Semifinals
Saturday, 7 October 2023	11:10	Bronze medal match
Saturday, 7 October 2023	11:30	Gold medal match

== Results ==
=== Qualification round ===
Rank	Seed	Athlete	Half		Total	10s	Xs
Rank	Seed	Athlete	1st	2nd	Total	10s	Xs
1	1	Lee Woo-seok (KOR)	345	345	690	46	17
2	2	Tang Chih-chun (TPE)	349	338	687	46	16
3	3	Oh Jin-hyek (KOR)	339	342	681	37	12
4	4	Atanu Das (IND)	343	335	678	36	14
5	5	Reza Shabani (IRI)	335	342	677	39	12
6	—	Kim Je-deok (KOR)	338	339	677	35	14
7	6	Dhiraj Bommadevara (IND)	344	331	675	40	12
8	—	Kim Woo-jin (KOR)	339	336	675	38	17
9	7	Riau Ega Agata (INA)	338	335	673	36	10
10	8	Su Yu-yang (TPE)	334	339	673	33	8
11	9	Amirkhon Sadikov (UZB)	337	335	672	36	13
12	10	Wei Shaoxuan (CHN)	331	339	670	34	13
13	—	Wei Chun-heng (TPE)	333	337	670	32	15
14	11	Mohammad Hossein Golshani (IRI)	338	331	669	31	11
15	—	Tushar Shelke (IND)	335	334	669	30	11
16	12	Qi Xiangshuo (CHN)	335	333	668	33	11
17	—	Mrinal Chauhan (IND)	329	338	667	32	16
18	13	Jason Feliciano (PHI)	334	332	666	28	10
19	14	Ilfat Abdullin (KAZ)	334	329	663	25	10
20	15	Baatarkhuyagiin Otgonbold (MGL)	328	334	662	30	6
21	—	Sadegh Ashrafi (IRI)	334	328	662	27	4
22	16	Sagor Islam (BAN)	326	336	662	25	10
23	17	Ahmad Khoirul Baasith (INA)	327	333	660	27	10
24	18	Takaharu Furukawa (JPN)	329	331	660	27	4
25	—	Arif Dwi Pangestu (INA)	330	330	660	24	9
26	19	Nguyễn Duy (VIE)	332	328	660	24	8
27	20	Robert Nam (TJK)	332	323	655	26	6
28	21	Dauletkeldi Zhangbyrbay (KAZ)	325	329	654	26	10
29	—	Ram Krishna Saha (BAN)	330	323	653	26	8
30	—	Li Zhongyuan (CHN)	327	326	653	23	6
31	23	Kwok Yin Chai (HKG)	329	322	651	24	7
32	24	Junya Nakanishi (JPN)	329	321	650	25	7
33	25	Lê Quốc Phong (VIE)	322	328	650	24	10
34	—	Ruman Shana (BAN)	319	329	648	21	8
35	22	Hakim Ahmed Rubel (BAN)	332	316	648	20	5
36	—	Alviyanto Prastyadi (INA)	323	323	646	23	9
37	—	Fumiya Saito (JPN)	323	322	645	18	5
38	26	Jonathan Reaport (PHI)	319	326	645	17	7
39	27	Lam Dorji (BHU)	329	315	644	18	5
40	—	Wang Dapeng (CHN)	324	319	643	15	5
41	28	Zarif Syahir Zolkepeli (MAS)	317	325	642	21	2
42	29	Khairul Anuar Mohamad (MAS)	320	321	641	19	3
43	—	Sultan Duzelbayev (KAZ)	321	319	640	16	7
44	—	Syafiq Busthamin (MAS)	328	311	639	20	4
45	30	Thiha Htet Zaw (MYA)	322	317	639	19	8
46	—	Nguyễn Đạt Mạnh (VIE)	317	322	639	16	8
47	—	Tai Yu-hsuan (TPE)	310	327	637	22	13
48	31	Jantsangiin Gantögs (MGL)	323	314	637	19	6
49	32	Ri Tae-bom (PRK)	314	323	637	19	4
50	33	Tanapat Pathairat (THA)	315	321	636	19	5
51	34	Asrar-ul-Haq (PAK)	312	322	634	19	6
52	35	Tilak Pun Magar (NEP)	317	317	634	18	1
53	36	Abdulrahman Al-Musa (KSA)	316	318	634	17	3
54	—	Sanzhar Mussayev (KAZ)	313	319	632	22	11
55	—	Danish Amsyar Norazlan (MAS)	320	312	632	20	5
56	—	Batbayaryn Buyantüshig (MGL)	317	314	631	15	2
57	37	Abdalla Al-Ketbi (UAE)	313	316	629	21	5
58	38	Phonthakorn Chaisilp (THA)	315	314	629	19	5
59	39	Lucien Law (HKG)	316	313	629	19	2
60	40	Chen Yao Yuy (UZB)	314	315	629	13	4
61	41	Mansour Alwi (KSA)	315	313	628	18	2
62	—	Witthaya Thamwong (THA)	308	317	625	20	6
63	42	Kim Kuk-song (PRK)	307	316	623	16	5
64	—	Dorjsürengiin Dashnamjil (MGL)	305	318	623	15	3
65	43	Hassan Al-Ashkanani (QAT)	309	310	619	17	6
66	—	Hoàng Văn Lộc (VIE)	304	314	618	17	2
67	—	Han Myong-gyu (PRK)	307	308	615	16	4
68	—	Mirjalol Mirolimov (UZB)	306	309	615	12	2
69	44	Sajeev De Silva (SRI)	308	306	614	16	7
70	—	Wan Chun Kit (HKG)	320	292	612	17	6
71	45	Ali Al-Zaid (KUW)	308	302	610	14	3
72	—	Ozodbek Ungalov (UZB)	305	296	601	15	7
73	—	Leung Cheuk Yin (HKG)	300	301	601	15	6
74	—	Rashed Al-Subaie (KSA)	309	292	601	11	6
75	46	Abdulla Taha (KUW)	306	292	598	10	1
76	47	Muhammad Nadeem (PAK)	297	299	596	9	3
77	—	Idrees Majeed (PAK)	299	295	594	10	3
78	—	Hatim Al-Hatim (KSA)	286	302	588	14	3
79	—	Denchai Thepna (THA)	287	296	583	8	3
80	48	Abdumalik Ganiev (TJK)	282	296	578	10	2
81	49	Ulukbek Kursanaliev (KGZ)	291	278	569	7	1
82	—	Salimjon Salimov (TJK)	274	284	558	5	2
83	50	Jacques El-Rayess (LBN)	275	278	553	7	1
84	—	Abdullah Al-Harbi (KUW)	262	243	505	4	2

=== Knockout round ===
==== Finals ====
Quarterfinals
1	Lee Woo-seok (KOR)	29	28	30	30	6
9	Amirkhon Sadikov (UZB)	28	29	29	27	2
12	Qi Xiangshuo (CHN)	29	29	28	27	29	10+	6
4	Atanu Das (IND)	23	29	30	29	28	10	5
14	Ilfat Abdullin (KAZ)	29	29	27	25	28	10	6
6	Dhiraj Bommadevara (IND)	30	19	28	16	28	9	5
7	Riau Ega Agata (INA)	26	25	28	0
15	Baatarkhuyagiin Otgonbold (MGL)	29	28	29	6

Semifinals
1	Lee Woo-seok (KOR)	28	28	29	30	27	10	5
12	Qi Xiangshuo (CHN)	28	29	26	27	28	10+	6
14	Ilfat Abdullin (KAZ)	27	27	29	28	2
15	Baatarkhuyagiin Otgonbold (MGL)	29	28	29	28	6

Gold medal match
12	Qi Xiangshuo (CHN)	28	28	29	27	2
15	Baatarkhuyagiin Otgonbold (MGL)	29	29	27	29	6
Bronze medal match
1	Lee Woo-seok (KOR)	29	29	29	30	7
14	Ilfat Abdullin (KAZ)	27	28	29	29	1

==== Section 1 ====
1/32 eliminations
33	Tanapat Pathairat (THA)	24	26	28	28	27	6
32	Ri Tae-bom (PRK)	30	27	23	27	26	4
17	Ahmad Khoirul Baasith (INA)	25	29	27	6
48	Abdumalik Ganiev (TJK)	24	17	26	0
49	Ulukbek Kursanaliev (KGZ)	28	25	25	23	1
16	Sagor Islam (BAN)	28	26	29	30	7

1/16 eliminations
1	Lee Woo-seok (KOR)	26	28	29	29	6
33	Tanapat Pathairat (THA)	26	28	28	26	2
17	Ahmad Khoirul Baasith (INA)	29	29	30	6
16	Sagor Islam (BAN)	28	27	29	0

1/8 eliminations
1	Lee Woo-seok (KOR)	30	28	28	27	7
17	Ahmad Khoirul Baasith (INA)	28	27	28	23	1

==== Section 2 ====
1/32 eliminations									1/16 eliminations								1/8 eliminations
									9	Amirkhon Sadikov (UZB)	28	26	25	29	28	6
41	Mansour Alwi (KSA)	28	29	29	24	29	7	5	24	Junya Nakanishi (JPN)	27	29	26	27	27	4
24	Junya Nakanishi (JPN)	28	29	29	28	27	9	6									9	Amirkhon Sadikov (UZB)	28	28	28	28	28	7
25	Lê Quốc Phong (VIE)	28	27	26	29			6									25	Lê Quốc Phong (VIE)	28	25	27	29	26	3
40	Chen Yao Yuy (UZB)	26	23	28	28			2	25	Lê Quốc Phong (VIE)	29	29	27	27	29	6
									8	Su Yu-yang (TPE)	28	28	27	28	29	4

==== Section 3 ====
1/32 eliminations									1/16 eliminations								1/8 eliminations
									5	Reza Shabani (IRI)	29	30	28			6
37	Abdalla Al-Ketbi (UAE)	24	24	26	23			2	28	Zarif Syahir Zolkepeli (MAS)	26	26	27			0
28	Zarif Syahir Zolkepeli (MAS)	23	28	29	25			6									5	Reza Shabani (IRI)	28	29	28	26	2
21	Dauletkeldi Zhangbyrbay (KAZ)	29	29	26	27	26	9+	6									12	Qi Xiangshuo (CHN)	29	29	28	28	6
44	Sajeev De Silva (SRI)	27	29	26	27	27	9	5	21	Dauletkeldi Zhangbyrbay (KAZ)	29	30	28	26	26	4
									12	Qi Xiangshuo (CHN)	26	29	29	29	28	6

==== Section 4 ====
1/32 eliminations							1/16 eliminations								1/8 eliminations
							13	Jason Feliciano (PHI)	24	26	26	25	27	3
45	Ali Al-Zaid (KUW)	24	26	25		0	20	Robert Nam (TJK)	28	25	26	30	29	7
20	Robert Nam (TJK)	28	28	27		6									20	Robert Nam (TJK)	26	28	25	26	1
29	Khairul Anuar Mohamad (MAS)	28	28	28	26	7									4	Atanu Das (IND)	28	28	26	28	7
36	Abdulrahman Al-Musa (KSA)	26	22	28	25	1	29	Khairul Anuar Mohamad (MAS)	27	28	28	26	28	4
							4	Atanu Das (IND)	27	29	24	26	29	6

==== Section 5 ====
1/32 eliminations							1/16 eliminations							1/8 eliminations
							3	Oh Jin-hyek (KOR)	28	29	30		6
35	Tilak Pun Magar (NEP)	27	26	28	28	7	35	Tilak Pun Magar (NEP)	25	24	27		0
30	Thiha Htet Zaw (MYA)	27	23	26	24	1								3	Oh Jin-hyek (KOR)	27	28	27	29	29	9	5
19	Nguyễn Duy (VIE)	28	28	28		6								14	Ilfat Abdullin (KAZ)	28	28	28	24	27	9+	6
46	Abdulla Taha (KUW)	27	23	27		0	19	Nguyễn Duy (VIE)	28	27	26	25	1
							14	Ilfat Abdullin (KAZ)	28	28	29	28	7

==== Section 6 ====
1/32 eliminations							1/16 eliminations							1/8 eliminations
							11	Mohammad Hossein Golshani (IRI)	25	25	26		0
43	Hassan Al-Ashkanani (QAT)	20	27	21		0	22	Hakim Ahmed Rubel (BAN)	27	28	28		6
22	Hakim Ahmed Rubel (BAN)	27	30	28		6								22	Hakim Ahmed Rubel (BAN)	27	30	27	27	29	8	5
27	Lam Dorji (BHU)	28	28	28	29	7								6	Dhiraj Bommadevara (IND)	27	28	28	28	25	10	6
38	Phonthakorn Chaisilp (THA)	27	25	28	27	1	27	Lam Dorji (BHU)	28	29	26	27	2
							6	Dhiraj Bommadevara (IND)	27	30	30	28	6

==== Section 7 ====
1/32 eliminations								1/16 eliminations								1/8 eliminations
								7	Riau Ega Agata (INA)	28	28	26	27	27	6
39	Lucien Law (HKG)	27	26	30	23	24	4	26	Jonathan Reaport (PHI)	27	29	28	23	25	4
26	Jonathan Reaport (PHI)	27	26	28	27	28	6									7	Riau Ega Agata (INA)	26	28	26	29	28	6
23	Kwok Yin Chai (HKG)	25	28	28	26	28	6									10	Wei Shaoxuan (CHN)	26	28	29	28	26	4
42	Kim Kuk-song (PRK)	26	25	27	28	24	4	23	Kwok Yin Chai (HKG)	29	26	28	25	27	4
								10	Wei Shaoxuan (CHN)	28	30	28	28	27	6

==== Section 8 ====
1/32 eliminations
15	Baatarkhuyagiin Otgonbold (MGL)	28	27	28	6
50	Jacques El-Rayess (LBN)	23	20	25	0
47	Muhammad Nadeem (PAK)	26	25	25	25	1
18	Takaharu Furukawa (JPN)	27	25	29	26	7
31	Jantsangiin Gantögs (MGL)	28	27	27	27	6
34	Asrar-ul-Haq (PAK)	25	27	25	27	2

1/16 eliminations
15	Baatarkhuyagiin Otgonbold (MGL)	27	28	27	27	26	10	6
18	Takaharu Furukawa (JPN)	27	29	29	26	25	9	5
31	Jantsangiin Gantögs (MGL)	28	28	27	20	2
2	Tang Chih-chun (TPE)	26	29	29	29	6

1/8 eliminations
15	Baatarkhuyagiin Otgonbold (MGL)	29	26	27	29	6
2	Tang Chih-chun (TPE)	27	27	26	28	2
