= Archery at the 2022 Asian Games =

- Venue: Fuyang Yinhu Sports Centre
- Dates: 1–7 October 2023
- Competitors: 283 from 33 nations

Archery at the 2022 Asian Games was held between 1 and 7 October 2023 at the Fuyang Yinhu Sports Centre in Fuyang District, Hangzhou, China, and consisted of ten events.

== Schedule ==
R	Ranking round	E	Elimination rounds	F	Finals

Event↓/Date →	1st Sun	2nd Mon	3rd Tue	4th Wed		5th Thu		6th Fri		7th Sat
Men's individual recurve	R	E	E							F
Men's individual compound	R	E	E							F
Men's team recurve	R	E						E	F	
Men's team compound	R	E				E	F			
Women's individual recurve	R	E	E							F
Women's individual compound	R	E	E							F
Women's team recurve	R	E						E	F	
Women's team compound	R	E				E	F			
Mixed team recurve	R	E		E	F					
Mixed team compound	R	E		E	F					

== Medalists ==
=== Recurve ===
Event	Gold	Silver	Bronze
Men's individual	Baatarkhuyagiin Otgonbold; Mongolia	Qi Xiangshuo; China	Lee Woo-seok; South Korea
Men's team	South Korea; Kim Je-deok; Lee Woo-seok; Oh Jin-hyek	India; Dhiraj Bommadevara; Atanu Das; Tushar Shelke	Indonesia; Riau Ega Agata; Ahmad Khoirul Baasith; Arif Dwi Pangestu
Women's individual	Lim Si-hyeon; South Korea	An San; South Korea	Li Jiaman; China
Women's team	South Korea; An San; Choi Mi-sun; Lim Si-hyeon	China; An Qixuan; Hailigan; Li Jiaman	India; Ankita Bhakat; Bhajan Kaur; Simranjeet Kaur
Mixed team	South Korea; Lee Woo-seok; Lim Si-hyeon	Japan; Takaharu Furukawa; Satsuki Noda	Indonesia; Riau Ega Agata; Diananda Choirunisa

=== Compound ===
Event	Gold	Silver	Bronze
Men's individual	Ojas Deotale; India	Abhishek Verma; India	Yang Jae-won; South Korea
Men's team	India; Ojas Deotale; Prathamesh Jawkar; Abhishek Verma	South Korea; Joo Jae-hoon; Kim Jong-ho; Yang Jae-won	Malaysia; Alang Arif Aqil; Syafiq Ariffin; Juwaidi Mazuki
Women's individual	Jyothi Surekha; India	So Chae-won; South Korea	Aditi Swami; India
Women's team	India; Parneet Kaur; Jyothi Surekha; Aditi Swami	Chinese Taipei; Chen Yi-hsuan; Huang I-jou; Wang Lu-yun	South Korea; Cho Su-a; Oh Yoo-hyun; So Chae-won
Mixed team	India; Ojas Deotale; Jyothi Surekha	South Korea; Joo Jae-hoon; So Chae-won	Chinese Taipei; Chang Cheng-wei; Chen Yi-hsuan

== Medal table ==
Rank	Nation	Gold	Silver	Bronze	Total
1	India (IND)	5	2	2	9
2	South Korea (KOR)	4	4	3	11
3	Mongolia (MGL)	1	0	0	1
4	China (CHN)	0	2	1	3
5	Chinese Taipei (TPE)	0	1	1	2
6	Japan (JPN)	0	1	0	1
7	Indonesia (INA)	0	0	2	2
8	Malaysia (MAS)	0	0	1	1
Totals (8 entries)		10	10	10	30

== Participating nations ==
A total of 283 athletes from 33 nations competed in archery at the 2022 Asian Games:

- Bangladesh (16)
- Bhutan (6)
- China (8)
- Chinese Taipei (16)
- Hong Kong (16)
- India (16)
- Indonesia (16)
- Iran (10)
- Iraq (2)
- Japan (6)
- Jordan (1)
- Kazakhstan (16)
- Kuwait (9)
- Kyrgyzstan (2)
- Lebanon (1)
- Malaysia (13)
- Mongolia (15)
- Myanmar (2)
- Nepal (4)
- North Korea (6)
- Pakistan (4)
- Philippines (7)
- Qatar (4)
- Saudi Arabia (12)
- Singapore (5)
- South Korea (16)
- Sri Lanka (3)
- Tajikistan (4)
- Thailand (16)
- United Arab Emirates (6)
- Uzbekistan (8)
- Vietnam (14)
- Yemen (3)
