= 2023 Archery World Cup =

International archery competition

- Sport: Archery
- Duration: 18 April – 10 September

World Cup Final
- Recurve Men: (gold) (Brazil) Marcus Vinicius D'Almeida; (silver) (South Korea) Lee Woo-seok; (bronze) (Italy) Mauro Nespoli
- Recurve Women: (gold) (South Korea) Kang Chae-young; (silver) (Mexico) Alejandra Valencia; (bronze) (South Korea) Lim Si-hyeon
- Compound Men: (gold) (Denmark) Mathias Fullerton; (silver) (India) Prathamesh Jawkar; (bronze) (Netherlands) Mike Schloesser
- Compound Women: (gold) (Colombia) Sara López; (silver) (Denmark) Tanja Gellenthien; (bronze) (Mexico) Dafne Quintero

Seasons
- ← 2022 2024 →

The 2023 Archery World Cup, also known as the Hyundai Archery World Cup for sponsorship reasons, was the 17th edition of the international archery circuit organised annually by World Archery. The 2023 World Cup consisted of five events, and ran from 18 April to 10 September 2023.

== Calendar ==
The calendar for the 2023 World Cup, announced by World Archery.

Stage	Date	Location	Ref.
1	18–23 April	Antalya, Turkey	
2	16–21 May	Shanghai, China	
3	13–18 June	Medellín, Colombia	
4	15–20 August	Paris, France	
Final	9–10 September	Hermosillo, Mexico	

== Results ==
=== Recurve ===
==== Men's individual ====
Stage	Venue	1st place, gold medalist(s)	2nd place, silver medalist(s)	3rd place, bronze medalist(s)
1	(Turkey) Antalya	(Moldova) Dan Olaru	(France) Jean-Charles Valladont	(India) Dhiraj Bommadevara
2	(China) Shanghai	(Brazil) Marcus D'Almeida	(South Korea) Oh Jin-hyek	(Netherlands) Steve Wijler
3	(Colombia) Medellín	(Italy) Mauro Nespoli	(South Korea) Kim Je-deok	(South Korea) Lee Woo-seok
4	(France) Paris	(South Korea) Kim Woo-jin	(South Korea) Lee Woo-seok	(Brazil) Marcus D'Almeida
Final	(Mexico) Hermosillo	(Brazil) Marcus D'Almeida	(South Korea) Lee Woo-seok	(Italy) Mauro Nespoli

==== Women's individual ====
Stage	Venue	1st place, gold medalist(s)	2nd place, silver medalist(s)	3rd place, bronze medalist(s)
1	(Turkey) Antalya	(United Kingdom) Penny Healey	(Germany) Elina Idensen	(China) An Qixuan
2	(China) Shanghai	(South Korea) Lim Si-hyeon	(South Korea) Kang Chae-young	(South Korea) An San
3	(Colombia) Medellín	(South Korea) Lim Si-hyeon	(Mexico) Ángela Ruiz	(United States) Jennifer Mucino-Fernandez
4	(France) Paris	(United States) Casey Kaufhold	(France) Lisa Barbelin	(South Korea) Choi Mi-sun
Final	(Mexico) Hermosillo	(South Korea) Kang Chae-young	(Mexico) Alejandra Valencia	(South Korea) Lim Si-hyeon

==== Men's team ====
Stage	Venue	1st place, gold medalist(s)	2nd place, silver medalist(s)	3rd place, bronze medalist(s)
1	(Turkey) Antalya	China; Li Zhongyuan; Qi Xiangshuo; Wei Shaoxuan	India; Dhiraj Bommadevara; Atanu Das; Tarundeep Rai	Slovenia; Den Habjan Malavašič; Žiga Ravnikar; Miha Rožič
2	(China) Shanghai	South Korea; Kim Je-deok; Kim Woo-jin; Lee Woo-seok	China; Li Zhongyuan; Qi Xiangshuo; Wang Dapeng	Japan; Takaharu Furukawa; Yuki Kawata; Fumiya Saito
3	(Colombia) Medellín	South Korea; Kim Je-deok; Kim Woo-jin; Lee Woo-seok	Chinese Taipei; Su Yu-yang; Tang Chih-chun; Wei Chun-heng	India; Dhiraj Bommadevara; Mrinal Chauhan; Tushar Shelke
4	(France) Paris	South Korea; Kim Je-deok; Kim Woo-jin; Lee Woo-seok	Chinese Taipei; Su Yu-yang; Tai Yu-hsuan; Wei Chun-heng	India; Dhiraj Bommadevara; Atanu Das; Tushar Shelke

==== Women's team ====
Stage	Venue	1st place, gold medalist(s)	2nd place, silver medalist(s)	3rd place, bronze medalist(s)
1	(Turkey) Antalya	Mexico; Aída Román; Ángela Ruiz; Alejandra Valencia	China; An Qixuan; Hai Ligan; Zhang Mengyao	France; Audrey Adiceom; Lisa Barbelin; Caroline Lopez
2	(China) Shanghai	South Korea; An San; Kang Chae-young; Lim Si-hyeon	Chinese Taipei; Kuo Tzu-ying; Lei Chien-ying; Peng Chia-mao	China; An Qixuan; Hai Ligan; Zhang Mengyao
3	(Colombia) Medellín	South Korea; An San; Kang Chae-young; Lim Si-hyeon	China; Li Jiaman; Wu Jiaxin; Yang Xiaolei	Chinese Taipei; Chiu Yi-ching; Lei Chien-ying; Peng Chia-mao
4	(France) Paris	South Korea; An San; Kang Chae-young; Lim Si-hyeon	Chinese Taipei; Chiu Yi-ching; Lei Chien-ying; Peng Chia-mao	India; Ankita Bhakat; Bhajan Kaur; Simranjeet Kaur

==== Mixed team ====
Stage	Venue	1st place, gold medalist(s)	2nd place, silver medalist(s)	3rd place, bronze medalist(s)
1	(Turkey) Antalya	United States; Casey Kaufhold; Brady Ellison	Chinese Taipei; Chiu Yi-ching; Tang Chih-chun	Spain; Elia Canales; Miguel Alvariño
2	(China) Shanghai	South Korea; Kang Chae-young; Lee Woo-seok	China; Zhang Mengyao; Wang Dapeng	Turkey; Fatma Maraşlı; Mete Gazoz
3	(Colombia) Medellín	United States; Jennifer Mucino-Fernandez; Brady Ellison	South Korea; Lim Si-hyeon; Kim Woo-jin	Chinese Taipei; Peng Chia-mao; Wei Chun-heng
4	(France) Paris	South Korea; Lim Si-hyeon; Lee Woo-seok	Chinese Taipei; Peng Chia-mao; Su Yu-yang	China; Li Jiaman; Wei Shaoxuan

=== Compound ===
==== Men's individual ====
Stage	Venue	1st place, gold medalist(s)	2nd place, silver medalist(s)	3rd place, bronze medalist(s)
1	(Turkey) Antalya	(Slovakia) Jozef Bošanský	(United States) Sawyer Sullivan	(Malaysia) Mohd Juwaidi Mazuki
2	(China) Shanghai	(India) Prathamesh Jawkar	(Netherlands) Mike Schloesser	(South Korea) Yang Jae-won
3	(Colombia) Medellín	(India) Abhishek Verma	(United States) James Lutz	(United States) Nick Kappers
4	(France) Paris	(Slovakia) Jozef Bošanský	(Mexico) Miguel Becerra	(Puerto Rico) Jean Pizarro
Final	(Mexico) Hermosillo	(Denmark) Mathias Fullerton	(India) Prathamesh Jawkar	(Netherlands) Mike Schloesser

==== Women's individual ====
Stage	Venue	1st place, gold medalist(s)	2nd place, silver medalist(s)	3rd place, bronze medalist(s)
1	(Turkey) Antalya	(India) Jyothi Surekha	(Colombia) Sara López	(Italy) Elisa Roner
2	(China) Shanghai	(South Korea) Cho Su-a	(United Kingdom) Ella Gibson	(India) Avneet Kaur
3	(Colombia) Medellín	(United States) Liko Arreola	(Colombia) Sara López	(Belgium) Sarah Prieels
4	(France) Paris	(United Kingdom) Ella Gibson	(Denmark) Tanja Gellenthien	(India) Jyothi Surekha
Final	(Mexico) Hermosillo	(Colombia) Sara López	(Denmark) Tanja Gellenthien	(Mexico) Dafne Quintero

==== Men's team ====
Stage	Venue	1st place, gold medalist(s)	2nd place, silver medalist(s)	3rd place, bronze medalist(s)
1	(Turkey) Antalya	Denmark; Tore Bjarnarson; Mathias Fullerton; Stephan Hansen	United States; Braden Gellenthien; James Lutz; Sawyer Sullivan	Chinese Taipei; Chen Chieh-lun; Pan Yu-ping; Yang Cheng-jui
2	(China) Shanghai	Netherlands; Sil Pater; Mike Schloesser; Jay Tjin-A-Djie	Mexico; Miguel Becerra; Sebastián García; Juan del Río	Turkey; Batuhan Akçaoğlu; Emircan Haney; Yakup Yıldız
3	(Colombia) Medellín	Guatemala; Julio Barillas; José Marcelo Del Cid; Pedro Salazar	Mexico; Miguel Becerra; Sebastián García; Juan del Río	India; Ojas Deotale; Prathamesh Jawkar; Abhishek Verma
4	(France) Paris	India; Ojas Deotale; Prathamesh Jawkar; Abhishek Verma	United States; James Lutz; Kris Schaff; Sawyer Sullivan	Denmark; Martin Damsbo; Mathias Fullerton; Stephan Hansen

==== Women's team ====
Stage	Venue	1st place, gold medalist(s)	2nd place, silver medalist(s)	3rd place, bronze medalist(s)
1	(Turkey) Antalya	United States; Cassidy Cox; Madison Cox; Danelle Wentzel-Lutz	Colombia; Juliana Gallego; Sara López; Alejandra Usquiano	Mexico; Andrea Becerra; Ana Sofía Hernández Jeon; Dafne Quintero
2	(China) Shanghai	Mexico; Andrea Becerra; Ana Sofía Hernández Jeon; Dafne Quintero	South Korea; Oh Yoo-hyun; So Chae-won; Song Yun-soo	Turkey; Hazal Burun; İpek Tomruk; Irmak Yüksel
3	(Colombia) Medellín	United States; Liko Arreola; Olivia Dean; Alexis Ruiz	Colombia; Juliana Gallego; Sara López; Alejandra Usquiano	India; Parneet Kaur; Aditi Swami; Jyothi Surekha
4	(France) Paris	India; Parneet Kaur; Aditi Swami; Jyothi Surekha	Mexico; Andrea Becerra; Ana Sofía Hernández Jeon; Dafne Quintero	South Korea; Oh Yoo-hyun; So Chae-won; Song Yun-soo

==== Mixed team ====
Stage	Venue	1st place, gold medalist(s)	2nd place, silver medalist(s)	3rd place, bronze medalist(s)
1	(Turkey) Antalya	India; Jyothi Surekha; Ojas Deotale	Chinese Taipei; Chen Yi-hsuan; Chen Chieh-lun	Malaysia; Fatin Nurfatehah Mat Salleh; Mohd Juwaidi Mazuki
2	(China) Shanghai	India; Jyothi Surekha; Ojas Deotale	South Korea; Oh Yoo-hyun; Kim Jong-ho	Mexico; Andrea Becerra; Miguel Becerra
3	(Colombia) Medellín	Colombia; Sara López; Sebastián Arenas	Mexico; Dafne Quintero; Sebastián García	Estonia; Lisell Jäätma; Robin Jäätma
4	(France) Paris	United States; Alexis Ruiz; Kris Schaff	Puerto Rico; Paola Ramírez; Jean Pizarro	Netherlands; Sanne de Laat; Mike Schloesser

== Medals table ==
Rank	Nation	Gold	Silver	Bronze	Total
1	South Korea	13	8	6	27
2	United States	7	4	2	13
3	India	7	2	8	17
4	Mexico	2	7	3	12
5	Colombia	2	4	0	6
6	Denmark	2	2	1	5
7	Great Britain	2	1	0	3
8	Brazil	2	0	1	3
9	Slovakia	2	0	0	2
10	China	1	4	3	8
11	Netherlands	1	1	3	5
12	Italy	1	0	2	3
13	Guatemala	1	0	0	1
13	Moldova	1	0	0	1
15	Chinese Taipei	0	7	3	10
16	France	0	2	1	3
17	Puerto Rico	0	1	1	2
18	Germany	0	1	0	1
19	Turkey	0	0	3	3
20	Malaysia	0	0	2	2
21	Belgium	0	0	1	1
21	Estonia	0	0	1	1
21	Japan	0	0	1	1
21	Slovenia	0	0	1	1
21	Spain	0	0	1	1
Totals (25 entries)		44	44	44	132
