= List of Asian Games records in archery =

This is the list of Asian Games records in archery.

== Recurve ==
=== Men ===
| Event | Record | Athlete | Nation | Games | Date |
Individual
| Qualification (72 arrows) | 698 | Dhiraj Bommadevara | India | 2026 Aichi–Nagoya | 26 September 2026 |
Team
| Qualification (216 arrows) | 2064 | Kim Je-deok; Lee Woo-seok; Kim Woo-jin | South Korea | 2026 Aichi–Nagoya | 26 September 2026 |

=== Women ===
| Event | Record | Athlete | Nation | Games | Date |
Individual
| Qualification (72 arrows) | 685 | Kang Chae-young | South Korea | 2026 Aichi–Nagoya | 26 September 2026 |
Team
| Qualification (216 arrows) | 2040 | Kang Chae-young; Oh Ye-jin; Lee Yun-ji | South Korea | 2026 Aichi–Nagoya | 26 September 2026 |

=== Mixed ===
| Event | Record | Athlete | Nation | Games | Date |
|---|---|---|---|---|---|
| Qualification (144 arrows) | 1378 | Kang Chae-young; Kim Je-deok | South Korea | 2026 Aichi–Nagoya | 26 September 2026 |

== Compound ==
=== Men ===
| Event | Record | Athlete | Nation | Games | Date |
Individual
| Qualification (72 arrows) | 712 | Joo Jae-hoon | South Korea | 2022 Hangzhou | 1 October 2023 |
| Knockout match (15 arrows) | 150 (7X) | Ojas Deotale | India | 2022 Hangzhou | 3 October 2023 |
Team
| Qualification (216 arrows) | 2130 | Liao Jiahao; Liu Jinyi; Shi Jingyu | China | 2026 Aichi–Nagoya | 26 September 2026 |
| Knockout match (24 arrows) | 239 | Choi Eun-gyu; Choi Yong-hee; Kim Jong-ho | South Korea | 2026 Aichi–Nagoya | 27 September 2026 |

=== Women ===
| Event | Record | Athlete | Nation | Games | Date |
Individual
| Qualification (72 arrows) | 706 | Chen Yi-hsuan | Chinese Taipei | 2018 Jakarta–Palembang | 22 August 2018 |
| Knockout match (15 arrows) | 150 (6X) | Kang Yeon-seo | South Korea | 2026 Aichi–Nagoya | 28 September 2026 |
Team
| Qualification (216 arrows) | 2105 | Choi Bo-min; So Chae-won; Song Yun-soo | South Korea | 2018 Jakarta–Palembang | 22 August 2018 |
| Knockout match (24 arrows) | 238 | Choi Bo-min; Kim Yun-hee; Seok Ji-hyun | South Korea | 2014 Incheon | 25 September 2014 |

=== Mixed ===
| Event | Record | Athlete | Nation | Games | Date |
|---|---|---|---|---|---|
| Qualification (144 arrows) | 1414 | Chikitha Taniparthi; Sahil Jadhav | India | 2026 Aichi–Nagoya | 26 September 2026 |
| Knockout match (16 arrows) | 160 (11X) | Park Jung-yoon; Choi Yong-hee | South Korea | 2026 Aichi–Nagoya | 27 September 2026 |
