= Archery at the 2022 Asian Games – Men's individual compound =

Men's individual compound at the 2022 Asian Games
- Venue: Fuyang Yinhu Sports Centre
- Dates: 1–7 October 2023
- Competitors: 64 from 22 nations

Medalists
gold medal	Ojas Deotale	India
silver medal	Abhishek Verma	India
bronze medal	Yang Jae-won	South Korea

The men's individual recurve archery competition at the 2022 Asian Games was held from 1 to 7 October 2023 at Fuyang Yinhu Sports Centre. A total of 64 archers participated in the ranking round. Only the top two archers from each country were allowed to progress to the knockout stage.

== Schedule ==
All times are China Standard Time (UTC+08:00)

Date	Time	Event
Sunday, 1 October 2023	14:20	Qualification round
Monday, 2 October 2023	12:15	1/32 eliminations
Monday, 2 October 2023	13:35	1/16 eliminations
Monday, 2 October 2023	14:05	1/8 eliminations
Tuesday, 3 October 2023	10:00	Quarterfinals
Tuesday, 3 October 2023	12:00	Semifinals
Saturday, 7 October 2023	09:20	Bronze medal match
Saturday, 7 October 2023	09:40	Gold medal match

== Results ==
=== Qualification round ===
Rank	Seed	Athlete	Half		Total	10s	Xs
Rank	Seed	Athlete	1st	2nd	Total	10s	Xs
1	1	Joo Jae-hoon (KOR)	357	355	712	64	26
2	2	Chang Cheng-wei (TPE)	356	355	711	63	26
3	3	Ojas Deotale (IND)	353	356	709	61	32
4	4	Abhishek Verma (IND)	351	357	708	60	28
5	5	Andrey Tyutyun (KAZ)	354	353	707	59	18
6	6	Mohammad Saleh Palizban (IRI)	352	353	705	57	26
7	7	Yang Jae-won (KOR)	350	353	703	57	28
8	—	Kim Jong-ho (KOR)	352	350	702	55	29
9	8	Juwaidi Mazuki (MAS)	350	352	702	54	27
10	—	Prathamesh Jawkar (IND)	349	351	700	53	26
11	9	Tandin Dorji (BHU)	347	352	699	53	22
12	10	Alang Arif Aqil (MAS)	348	351	699	53	16
13	11	Akbarali Karabayev (KAZ)	345	354	699	52	25
14	12	Mohammad Ashikuzzaman (BAN)	350	349	699	52	22
15	13	Armin Pakzad (IRI)	345	353	698	52	28
16	—	Rajat Chauhan (IND)	348	350	698	52	25
17	14	Chen Chieh-lun (TPE)	352	345	697	49	17
18	15	Dhany Diva Pradana (INA)	342	354	696	52	17
19	—	Yang Cheng-jui (TPE)	345	349	694	49	21
20	16	Patrick Lee (HKG)	344	350	694	48	26
21	17	Deki Adika Hastian (INA)	343	351	694	46	18
22	—	Syafiq Ariffin (MAS)	339	354	693	49	22
23	18	Dương Duy Bảo (VIE)	342	351	693	47	18
24	—	Choi Yong-hee (KOR)	341	351	692	53	34
25	—	Milad Rashidi (IRI)	347	345	692	47	22
26	—	Hendika Pratama Putra (INA)	344	348	692	47	18
27	19	Cheung Cheuk Sing (HKG)	349	342	691	47	19
28	20	Nguyễn Văn Đầy (VIE)	344	347	691	45	17
29	21	Sohel Rana (BAN)	343	347	690	45	18
30	—	Pan Yu-ping (TPE)	344	345	689	41	22
31	22	Sirapop Chainak (THA)	345	343	688	48	24
32	—	Tsui Chun Kit (HKG)	339	349	688	45	11
33	23	Khendrup (BHU)	345	343	688	44	17
34	24	Kittiphat Uthaimongkol (THA)	340	348	688	44	16
35	25	Woon Teng Ng (SGP)	342	344	686	44	21
36	—	Ratanadanai Wongtana (THA)	347	339	686	41	19
37	—	Bunyod Mirzametov (KAZ)	342	344	686	41	18
38	26	Paul Dela Cruz (PHI)	339	347	686	40	14
39	—	Ryan Hidayat (INA)	336	349	685	43	15
40	—	Nitiphum Chatachot (THA)	339	344	683	39	16
41	27	Eshaq Ibrahim (IRQ)	342	340	682	44	17
42	28	Abdulaziz Al-Rodhan (KSA)	339	341	680	38	22
43	29	Belal Al-Awadi (KSA)	335	345	680	38	19
44	—	Wong Co Wan (MAS)	341	339	680	36	18
45	—	Sze Sing Yu (HKG)	347	333	680	36	8
46	30	Ahmad Al-Shatti (KUW)	332	346	678	37	8
47	31	Pürevdorjiin Jamiyangombo (MGL)	339	338	677	35	7
48	—	Shamil Sagutdinov (KAZ)	331	343	674	35	15
49	32	Bader Al-Shalahi (KUW)	337	336	673	35	13
50	—	Trần Trung Hiếu (VIE)	325	344	669	35	12
51	—	Younten Jamtsho (BHU)	332	335	667	34	10
52	33	Mohammed Binamro (UAE)	329	338	667	30	10
53	34	Wasantha Kumara (SRI)	328	336	664	33	15
54	—	Mithu Rahman (BAN)	330	333	663	30	15
55	—	Majdi Al-Subhi (KSA)	329	332	661	27	11
56	—	Nawaz Ahmed Rakib (BAN)	327	333	660	37	16
57	35	Ahmed Al-Abadi (QAT)	324	335	659	26	10
58	36	Ganzorigiin Shandan (MGL)	326	333	659	25	9
59	—	Saud Al-Arifi (KSA)	324	333	657	32	13
60	37	Alan Lee (SGP)	326	329	655	24	7
61	—	Shagjsürengiin Davaakhüü (MGL)	322	331	653	20	4
62	—	Goh Jun Hui (SGP)	323	322	645	20	6
63	—	Ganbaataryn Ganzorig (MGL)	318	326	644	22	6
64	38	Yogendra Sherchan (NEP)	313	309	622	16	5

=== Knockout round ===
==== Finals ====
Semifinals
1	Joo Jae-hoon (KOR)	145
4	Abhishek Verma (IND)	147
3	Ojas Deotale (IND)	150
7	Yang Jae-won (KOR)	146

Gold medal match
4	Abhishek Verma (IND)	147
3	Ojas Deotale (IND)	149
Bronze medal match
1	Joo Jae-hoon (KOR)	146
7	Yang Jae-won (KOR)	147

==== Section 1 ====
1/32 eliminations
33	Mohammed Binamro (UAE)	137
32	Bader Al-Shalahi (KUW)	138

1/16 eliminations
1	Joo Jae-hoon (KOR)	147
32	Bader Al-Shalahi (KUW)	146
17	Deki Adika Hastian (INA)	144
16	Patrick Lee (HKG)	141
9	Tandin Dorji (BHU)	148
24	Kittiphat Uthaimongkol (THA)	142
25	Woon Teng Ng (SGP)	145
8	Juwaidi Mazuki (MAS)	146

1/8 eliminations
1	Joo Jae-hoon (KOR)	149
17	Deki Adika Hastian (INA)	147
9	Tandin Dorji (BHU)	146
8	Juwaidi Mazuki (MAS)	147

Quarterfinals
1	Joo Jae-hoon (KOR)	148
8	Juwaidi Mazuki (MAS)	135

==== Section 2 ====
1/32 eliminations
37	Alan Lee (SGP)	142
28	Abdulaziz Al-Rodhan (KSA)	138
29	Belal Al-Awadi (KSA)	141
36	Ganzorigiin Shandan (MGL)	140

1/16 eliminations
5	Andrey Tyutyun (KAZ)	149
37	Alan Lee (SGP)	137
21	Sohel Rana (BAN)	146
12	Mohammad Ashikuzzaman (BAN)	145
13	Armin Pakzad (IRI)	145
20	Nguyễn Văn Đầy (VIE)	146
29	Belal Al-Awadi (KSA)	139
4	Abhishek Verma (IND)	147

1/8 eliminations
5	Andrey Tyutyun (KAZ)	149
21	Sohel Rana (BAN)	144
20	Nguyễn Văn Đầy (VIE)	142
4	Abhishek Verma (IND)	146

Quarterfinals
5	Andrey Tyutyun (KAZ)	147^{10}
4	Abhishek Verma (IND)	147^{10+}

==== Section 3 ====
1/32 eliminations
35	Ahmed Al-Abadi (QAT)	134
30	Ahmad Al-Shatti (KUW)	141
27	Eshaq Ibrahim (IRQ)	140
38	Yogendra Sherchan (NEP)	135

1/16 eliminations
3	Ojas Deotale (IND)	148
30	Ahmad Al-Shatti (KUW)	138
19	Cheung Cheuk Sing (HKG)	143
14	Chen Chieh-lun (TPE)	147
11	Akbarali Karabayev (KAZ)	146^{10}
22	Sirapop Chainak (THA)	146^{9}
27	Eshaq Ibrahim (IRQ)	142
6	Mohammad Saleh Palizban (IRI)	145

1/8 eliminations
3	Ojas Deotale (IND)	146
14	Chen Chieh-lun (TPE)	145
11	Akbarali Karabayev (KAZ)	148
6	Mohammad Saleh Palizban (IRI)	146

Quarterfinals
3	Ojas Deotale (IND)	150
11	Akbarali Karabayev (KAZ)	142

==== Section 4 ====
1/32 eliminations
31	Pürevdorjiin Jamiyangombo (MGL)	137
34	Wasantha Kumara (SRI)	139

1/16 eliminations
7	Yang Jae-won (KOR)	149
26	Paul Dela Cruz (PHI)	142
23	Khendrup (BHU)	138
10	Alang Arif Aqil (MAS)	146
15	Dhany Diva Pradana (INA)	144^{10}
18	Dương Duy Bảo (VIE)	144^{9}
34	Wasantha Kumara (SRI)	128
2	Chang Cheng-wei (TPE)	148

1/8 eliminations
7	Yang Jae-won (KOR)	149
10	Alang Arif Aqil (MAS)	145
15	Dhany Diva Pradana (INA)	145
2	Chang Cheng-wei (TPE)	146

Quarterfinals
7	Yang Jae-won (KOR)	147
2	Chang Cheng-wei (TPE)	144
