= Archery at the 2022 Asian Games – Mixed team compound =

Mixed team compound at the 2022 Asian Games
- Venue: Fuyang Yinhu Sports Centre
- Dates: 1–4 October 2023
- Competitors: 108 from 20 nations

Medalists
gold medal	Ojas Deotale; Jyothi Surekha	India
silver medal	Joo Jae-hoon; So Chae-won	South Korea
bronze medal	Chang Cheng-wei; Chen Yi-hsuan	Chinese Taipei

The mixed team compound archery competition at the 2022 Asian Games was held from 1 to 4 October 2023 at Fuyang Yinhu Sports Centre.

Ranking round classification was ranked based on the combined score of the best men and women archer in the individual ranking round.

== Schedule ==
All times are China Standard Time (UTC+08:00)

Date	Time	Event
Sunday, 1 October 2023	09:00	Qualification round women
Sunday, 1 October 2023	14:20	Qualification round men
Monday, 2 October 2023	09:00	1/8 eliminations
Wednesday, 4 October 2023	08:40	Quarterfinals
Wednesday, 4 October 2023	10:00	Semifinals
Wednesday, 4 October 2023	10:40	Bronze medal match
Wednesday, 4 October 2023	11:00	Gold medal match

== Results ==
Legend

- M — Men
- W — Women

=== Qualification round ===
Rank	Team	Half		Total	10s	Xs
Rank	Team	1st	2nd	Total	10s	Xs
1	India (IND)	708	705	1413	118	66
M	Rajat Chauhan	~~348~~	~~350~~	~~698~~	~~52~~	~~25~~
M	Ojas Deotale	353	356	709	61	32
M	Prathamesh Jawkar	~~349~~	~~351~~	~~700~~	~~53~~	~~26~~
M	Abhishek Verma	~~351~~	~~357~~	~~708~~	~~60~~	~~28~~
W	Avneet Kaur	~~340~~	~~345~~	~~685~~	~~42~~	~~12~~
W	Parneet Kaur	~~343~~	~~344~~	~~687~~	~~43~~	~~18~~
W	Jyothi Surekha	355	349	704	57	34
W	Aditi Swami	~~346~~	~~350~~	~~696~~	~~50~~	~~14~~
2	South Korea (KOR)	706	705	1411	116	49
M	Choi Yong-hee	~~341~~	~~351~~	~~692~~	~~53~~	~~34~~
M	Joo Jae-hoon	357	355	712	64	26
M	Kim Jong-ho	~~352~~	~~350~~	~~702~~	~~55~~	~~29~~
M	Yang Jae-won	~~350~~	~~353~~	~~703~~	~~57~~	~~28~~
W	Cho Su-a	~~348~~	~~343~~	~~691~~	~~45~~	~~16~~
W	Oh Yoo-hyun	~~348~~	~~349~~	~~697~~	~~49~~	~~23~~
W	So Chae-won	349	350	699	52	23
W	Song Yun-soo	~~346~~	~~338~~	~~684~~	~~42~~	~~25~~
3	Chinese Taipei (TPE)	704	702	1406	112	47
M	Chang Cheng-wei	356	355	711	63	26
M	Chen Chieh-lun	~~352~~	~~345~~	~~697~~	~~49~~	~~17~~
M	Pan Yu-ping	~~344~~	~~345~~	~~689~~	~~41~~	~~22~~
M	Yang Cheng-jui	~~345~~	~~349~~	~~694~~	~~49~~	~~21~~
W	Chen Li-ju	~~342~~	~~344~~	~~686~~	~~44~~	~~15~~
W	Chen Yi-hsuan	348	347	695	49	21
W	Huang I-jou	~~346~~	~~344~~	~~690~~	~~44~~	~~21~~
W	Wang Lu-yun	~~346~~	~~342~~	~~688~~	~~45~~	~~18~~
4	Kazakhstan (KAZ)	700	696	1396	103	38
M	Akbarali Karabayev	~~345~~	~~354~~	~~699~~	~~52~~	~~25~~
M	Bunyod Mirzametov	~~342~~	~~344~~	~~686~~	~~41~~	~~18~~
M	Shamil Sagutdinov	~~331~~	~~343~~	~~674~~	~~35~~	~~15~~
M	Andrey Tyutyun	354	353	707	59	18
W	Viktoriya Lyan	~~328~~	~~342~~	~~670~~	~~37~~	~~14~~
W	Elmira Raissova	~~341~~	~~340~~	~~681~~	~~34~~	~~18~~
W	Roxana Yunussova	~~333~~	~~342~~	~~675~~	~~36~~	~~19~~
W	Adel Zhexenbinova	346	343	689	44	20
5	Iran (IRI)	689	702	1391	98	44
M	Armin Pakzad	~~345~~	~~353~~	~~698~~	~~52~~	~~28~~
M	Mohammad Saleh Palizban	352	353	705	57	26
M	Milad Rashidi	~~347~~	~~345~~	~~692~~	~~47~~	~~22~~
W	Gisa Baibordi	337	349	686	41	18
6	Indonesia (INA)	687	699	1386	98	33
M	Deki Adika Hastian	~~343~~	~~351~~	~~694~~	~~46~~	~~18~~
M	Ryan Hidayat	~~336~~	~~349~~	~~685~~	~~43~~	~~15~~
M	Dhany Diva Pradana	342	354	696	52	17
M	Hendika Pratama Putra	~~344~~	~~348~~	~~692~~	~~47~~	~~18~~
W	Ratih Zilizati Fadhly	345	345	690	46	16
W	Syahara Khoerunisa	~~343~~	~~340~~	~~683~~	~~42~~	~~22~~
W	Sri Ranti	~~338~~	~~338~~	~~676~~	~~37~~	~~15~~
W	Firstalitha Kyla Widaputri	~~333~~	~~335~~	~~668~~	~~29~~	~~13~~
7	Vietnam (VIE)	685	692	1377	88	37
M	Dương Duy Bảo	342	351	693	47	18
M	Nguyễn Văn Đầy	~~344~~	~~347~~	~~691~~	~~45~~	~~17~~
M	Trần Trung Hiếu	~~325~~	~~344~~	~~669~~	~~35~~	~~12~~
W	Lê Phạm Ngọc Anh	~~336~~	~~335~~	~~671~~	~~31~~	~~13~~
W	Nguyễn Thị Hải Châu	343	341	684	41	19
W	Voòng Phương Thảo	~~339~~	~~322~~	~~661~~	~~31~~	~~6~~
8	Malaysia (MAS)	677	699	1376	94	41
M	Alang Arif Aqil	~~348~~	~~351~~	~~699~~	~~53~~	~~16~~
M	Syafiq Ariffin	~~339~~	~~354~~	~~693~~	~~49~~	~~22~~
M	Juwaidi Mazuki	350	352	702	54	27
M	Wong Co Wan	~~341~~	~~339~~	~~680~~	~~36~~	~~18~~
W	Fatin Nurfatehah Mat Salleh	327	347	674	40	14
9	Singapore (SGP)	687	688	1375	90	36
M	Goh Jun Hui	~~323~~	~~322~~	~~645~~	~~20~~	~~6~~
M	Alan Lee	~~326~~	~~329~~	~~655~~	~~24~~	~~7~~
M	Woon Teng Ng	342	344	686	44	21
W	Contessa Loh	345	344	689	46	15
W	Madeleine Ong	~~336~~	~~319~~	~~655~~	~~23~~	~~5~~
10	Bangladesh (BAN)	690	685	1375	86	30
M	Mohammad Ashikuzzaman	350	349	699	52	22
M	Mithu Rahman	~~330~~	~~333~~	~~663~~	~~30~~	~~15~~
M	Nawaz Ahmed Rakib	~~327~~	~~333~~	~~660~~	~~37~~	~~16~~
M	Sohel Rana	~~343~~	~~347~~	~~690~~	~~45~~	~~18~~
W	Bonna Akter	340	336	676	34	8
W	Susmita Banik	~~321~~	~~338~~	~~659~~	~~27~~	~~8~~
W	Shamoli Ray	~~332~~	~~334~~	~~666~~	~~27~~	~~9~~
W	Puspita Zaman	~~336~~	~~336~~	~~672~~	~~34~~	~~9~~
11	Philippines (PHI)	682	688	1370	81	28
M	Paul Dela Cruz	339	347	686	40	14
W	Amaya Cojuangco	343	341	684	41	14
W	Andrea Robles	~~333~~	~~338~~	~~671~~	~~34~~	~~17~~
12	Thailand (THA)	684	685	1369	87	41
M	Sirapop Chainak	345	343	688	48	24
M	Nitiphum Chatachot	~~339~~	~~344~~	~~683~~	~~39~~	~~16~~
M	Kittiphat Uthaimongkol	~~340~~	~~348~~	~~688~~	~~44~~	~~16~~
M	Ratanadanai Wongtana	~~347~~	~~339~~	~~686~~	~~41~~	~~19~~
W	Nichaphat Bunyapalin	~~336~~	~~340~~	~~676~~	~~35~~	~~15~~
W	Kanoknapus Kaewchomphu	~~338~~	~~336~~	~~674~~	~~34~~	~~12~~
W	Kanyavee Maneesombatkul	339	342	681	39	17
W	Kodchaporn Pratumsuwan	~~335~~	~~336~~	~~671~~	~~34~~	~~5~~
13	Hong Kong (HKG)	680	685	1365	84	39
M	Cheung Cheuk Sing	~~349~~	~~342~~	~~691~~	~~47~~	~~19~~
M	Patrick Lee	344	350	694	48	26
M	Sze Sing Yu	~~347~~	~~333~~	~~680~~	~~36~~	~~8~~
M	Tsui Chun Kit	~~339~~	~~349~~	~~688~~	~~45~~	~~11~~
W	Cheng Hung Ting	336	335	671	36	13
W	Lee Wai Hong	~~319~~	~~319~~	~~638~~	~~17~~	~~5~~
W	Luk Yin Yi	~~326~~	~~325~~	~~651~~	~~24~~	~~10~~
W	Wong Yuk Sheung	~~331~~	~~328~~	~~659~~	~~30~~	~~9~~
14	Iraq (IRQ)	682	676	1358	84	34
M	Eshaq Ibrahim	342	340	682	44	17
W	Fatimah Saad	340	336	676	40	17
15	Mongolia (MGL)	671	666	1337	62	16
M	Shagjsürengiin Davaakhüü	~~322~~	~~331~~	~~653~~	~~20~~	~~4~~
M	Ganbaataryn Ganzorig	~~318~~	~~326~~	~~644~~	~~22~~	~~6~~
M	Pürevdorjiin Jamiyangombo	339	338	677	35	7
M	Ganzorigiin Shandan	~~326~~	~~333~~	~~659~~	~~25~~	~~9~~
W	Battsetsegiin Batdulam	332	328	660	27	9
W	Orkhony Binderiya	~~320~~	~~313~~	~~633~~	~~20~~	~~9~~
W	Sükhbatyn Mönkh-Erdene	~~314~~	~~320~~	~~634~~	~~17~~	~~4~~
16	United Arab Emirates (UAE)	668	668	1336	61	24
M	Mohammed Binamro	329	338	667	30	10
W	Amna Al-Awadhi	339	330	669	31	14
W	Joumana Al-Najjar	~~304~~	~~321~~	~~625~~	~~17~~	~~7~~
17	Kuwait (KUW)	657	672	1329	57	16
M	Bader Al-Shalahi	~~337~~	~~336~~	~~673~~	~~35~~	~~13~~
M	Ahmad Al-Shatti	332	346	678	37	8
W	Hanan Al-Mayyas	325	326	651	20	8
18	Qatar (QAT)	645	653	1298	50	18
M	Ahmed Al-Abadi	324	335	659	26	10
W	Reem Al-Neama	321	318	639	24	8
19	Sri Lanka (SRI)	641	646	1287	45	22
M	Wasantha Kumara	328	336	664	33	15
W	Anuradha Karunaratne	313	310	623	12	7
20	Nepal (NEP)	641	628	1269	38	13
M	Yogendra Sherchan	313	309	622	16	5
W	Imayung Rai	328	319	647	22	8

=== Knockout round ===
1/8 eliminations
1	India	159
16	United Arab Emirates	151
9	Singapore	151
8	Malaysia	158
5	Iran	148
12	Thailand	154
13	Hong Kong	138
4	Kazakhstan	153
3	Chinese Taipei	158
14	Iraq	152
11	Philippines	153
6	Indonesia	156
7	Vietnam	154
10	Bangladesh	153
15	Mongolia	145
2	South Korea	155

Quarterfinals
1	India	158
8	Malaysia	155
12	Thailand	152
4	Kazakhstan	154
3	Chinese Taipei	156
6	Indonesia	154
7	Vietnam	153
2	South Korea	158

Semifinals
1	India	159
4	Kazakhstan	154
3	Chinese Taipei	153
2	South Korea	158

Gold medal match
1	India	159
2	South Korea	158
Bronze medal match
4	Kazakhstan	154
3	Chinese Taipei	157
