= Yashdeep Bhoge =

Indian recurve archer (born 2000)

Yashdeep Sanjay Bhoge (born 2000) is an Indian recurve archer from Maharashtra. He qualified to represent India in recurve men's individual and team events, at the 2026 Asian Games at Nagoya, Aichi Prefecture, Japan from 19 September to 4 October 2026.

== Early life ==
Bhoge is from Amravati, Maharashtra. He did his schooling at School of Scholars in Amravati, where he started archery in Class 5 out of curiosity. In school, he trained under sports instructors Neeraj Daff and Ganesh Vishwakarma. Later, he did law at Dr Punjabrao Deshmukh Law College, also in Amravati, from 2019 to 2024 when he represented Sant Gadge Baba Amravati University twice in the world-level University competitions. He joined Indian Railways in 2024 and works as a junior clerk.

== Career ==
After six years of archery in Amravati, he joined Tata Archery Academy in Jamshedpur, Jharkhand, where he trained from 2021 to 2024. From 2024, he trained at Sports Authority of India's (SAI) Sonipat centre under Korean coach, Lee Chae-un.

In May 2026, he was selected in the four-day trials held at Sonipet to pick the Indian teams for Asian Games and stages three and four of the Hyundai Archery World Cup in Antalya and Madrid. He was selected for recurve men's individual and team event, along with Dhiraj Bommadevara and Neeraj Chouhan. Earlier in the first archery trials in January 2026 held at Sports Authority of India centre, Kolkata, he topped the recurve men's section.

In November 2025, Bhoge won a gold medal in the men's individual category at the Asian Archery Championships 2025 at Dhaka, Bangladesh. Along with Atanu Das and Rahul also won the gold for India in the recurve men's team event.

In July 2023, he scored 687 out of 720 to top the men's qualification round at the Chengdu Summer World University Games. In 2001, he bagged his maiden international medal, a mixed event gold at the 2019 Asia Cup Leg 1 in Bangkok.

== Awards ==
On April 18, 2025, Maharashtra government awarded him the Shiv Chhatrapati Rajya Krida Puraskar (sports medal) as the best athlete in archery.
