= Archery at the 2022 Asian Games – Men's team compound =

Men's team compound at the 2022 Asian Games
- Venue: Fuyang Yinhu Sports Centre
- Dates: 1–5 October 2023
- Competitors: 56 from 15 nations

Medalists
gold medal	India; Ojas Deotale, Prathamesh Jawkar, Abhishek Verma
silver medal	South Korea; Joo Jae-hoon, Kim Jong-ho, Yang Jae-won
bronze medal	Malaysia; Alang Arif Aqil, Syafiq Ariffin, Juwaidi Mazuki

The men's team compound archery competition at the 2022 Asian Games was held from 1 to 5 October 2023 at Fuyang Yinhu Sports Centre. A total of 15 nations participated in the ranking round. Each team consisted of the highest ranked three athletes from the qualification round.

== Schedule ==
All times are China Standard Time (UTC+08:00)

Date	Time	Event
Sunday, 1 October 2023	14:20	Qualification round
Monday, 2 October 2023	10:00	1/8 eliminations
Thursday, 5 October 2023	13:30	Quarterfinals
Thursday, 5 October 2023	15:10	Semifinals
Thursday, 5 October 2023	16:00	Bronze medal match
Thursday, 5 October 2023	16:25	Gold medal match

== Results ==
=== Qualification round ===
Rank	Team	Half		Total	10s	Xs
Rank	Team	1st	2nd	Total	10s	Xs
1	South Korea (KOR)	1059	1058	2117	176	83
	Choi Yong-hee	~~341~~	~~351~~	~~692~~	~~53~~	~~34~~
	Joo Jae-hoon	357	355	712	64	26
	Kim Jong-ho	352	350	702	55	29
	Yang Jae-won	350	353	703	57	28
2	India (IND)	1053	1064	2117	174	86
	Rajat Chauhan	~~348~~	~~350~~	~~698~~	~~52~~	~~25~~
	Ojas Deotale	353	356	709	61	32
	Prathamesh Jawkar	349	351	700	53	26
	Abhishek Verma	351	357	708	60	28
3	Chinese Taipei (TPE)	1053	1049	2102	161	64
	Chang Cheng-wei	356	355	711	63	26
	Chen Chieh-lun	352	345	697	49	17
	Pan Yu-ping	~~344~~	~~345~~	~~689~~	~~41~~	~~22~~
	Yang Cheng-jui	345	349	694	49	21
4	Iran (IRI)	1044	1051	2095	156	76
	Armin Pakzad	345	353	698	52	28
	Mohammad Saleh Palizban	352	353	705	57	26
	Milad Rashidi	347	345	692	47	22
5	Malaysia (MAS)	1037	1057	2094	156	65
	Alang Arif Aqil	348	351	699	53	16
	Syafiq Ariffin	339	354	693	49	22
	Juwaidi Mazuki	350	352	702	54	27
	Wong Co Wan	~~341~~	~~339~~	~~680~~	~~36~~	~~18~~
6	Kazakhstan (KAZ)	1041	1051	2092	152	61
	Akbarali Karabayev	345	354	699	52	25
	Bunyod Mirzametov	342	344	686	41	18
	Shamil Sagutdinov	~~331~~	~~343~~	~~674~~	~~35~~	~~15~~
	Andrey Tyutyun	354	353	707	59	18
7	Indonesia (INA)	1029	1053	2082	145	53
	Deki Adika Hastian	343	351	694	46	18
	Ryan Hidayat	~~336~~	~~349~~	~~685~~	~~43~~	~~15~~
	Dhany Diva Pradana	342	354	696	52	17
	Hendika Pratama Putra	344	348	692	47	18
8	Hong Kong (HKG)	1032	1041	2073	140	56
	Cheung Cheuk Sing	349	342	691	47	19
	Patrick Lee	344	350	694	48	26
	Sze Sing Yu	~~347~~	~~333~~	~~680~~	~~36~~	~~8~~
	Tsui Chun Kit	339	349	688	45	11
9	Thailand (THA)	1032	1030	2062	133	59
	Sirapop Chainak	345	343	688	48	24
	Nitiphum Chatachot	~~339~~	~~344~~	~~683~~	~~39~~	~~16~~
	Kittiphat Uthaimongkol	340	348	688	44	16
	Ratanadanai Wongtana	347	339	686	41	19
10	Bhutan (BHU)	1024	1030	2054	131	49
	Tandin Dorji	347	352	699	53	22
	Younten Jamtsho	332	335	667	34	10
	Khendrup	345	343	688	44	17
11	Vietnam (VIE)	1011	1042	2053	127	47
	Dương Duy Bảo	342	351	693	47	18
	Nguyễn Văn Đầy	344	347	691	45	17
	Trần Trung Hiếu	325	344	669	35	12
12	Bangladesh (BAN)	1023	1029	2052	127	55
	Mohammad Ashikuzzaman	350	349	699	52	22
	Mithu Rahman	330	333	663	30	15
	Nawaz Ahmed Rakib	~~327~~	~~333~~	~~660~~	~~37~~	~~16~~
	Sohel Rana	343	347	690	45	18
13	Saudi Arabia (KSA)	1003	1018	2021	103	52
	Saud Al-Arifi	~~324~~	~~333~~	~~657~~	~~32~~	~~13~~
	Belal Al-Awadi	335	345	680	38	19
	Abdulaziz Al-Rodhan	339	341	680	38	22
	Majdi Al-Subhi	329	332	661	27	11
14	Mongolia (MGL)	987	1002	1989	80	20
	Shagjsürengiin Davaakhüü	322	331	653	20	4
	Ganbaataryn Ganzorig	~~318~~	~~326~~	~~644~~	~~22~~	~~6~~
	Pürevdorjiin Jamiyangombo	339	338	677	35	7
	Ganzorigiin Shandan	326	333	659	25	9
15	Singapore (SGP)	991	995	1986	88	34
	Goh Jun Hui	323	322	645	20	6
	Alan Lee	326	329	655	24	7
	Woon Teng Ng	342	344	686	44	21

=== Knockout round ===
1/8 eliminations
9	Thailand	230
8	Hong Kong	223
5	Malaysia	231
12	Bangladesh	229
13	Saudi Arabia	223
4	Iran	231
3	Chinese Taipei	232
14	Mongolia	212
11	Vietnam	231
6	Kazakhstan	233
7	Indonesia	228
10	Bhutan	232
15	Singapore	219
2	India	235

Quarterfinals
1	South Korea	228
9	Thailand	222
5	Malaysia	227
4	Iran	221
3	Chinese Taipei	231
6	Kazakhstan	229
10	Bhutan	221
2	India	235

Semifinals
1	South Korea	232
5	Malaysia	230
3	Chinese Taipei	224
2	India	235

Gold medal match
1	South Korea	230
2	India	235
Bronze medal match
5	Malaysia	228
3	Chinese Taipei	208
