= Archery at the 2022 Asian Games – Men's team recurve =

Men's team recurve at the 2022 Asian Games
- Venue: Fuyang Yinhu Sports Centre
- Dates: 1–6 October 2023
- Competitors: 74 from 20 nations

Medalists
| gold medal | South Korea; Kim Je-deok, Lee Woo-seok, Oh Jin-hyek |
| silver medal | India; Dhiraj Bommadevara, Atanu Das, Tushar Shelke |
| bronze medal | Indonesia; Riau Ega Agata, Ahmad Khoirul Baasith, Arif Dwi Pangestu |

The men's team recurve archery competition at the 2022 Asian Games was held from 1 to 6 October 2023 at Fuyang Yinhu Sports Centre.

A total of 20 nations participated in the ranking round. Each team consisted of the highest ranked three athletes from the qualification round.

== Schedule ==
All times are China Standard Time (UTC+08:00)

| Date | Time | Event |
|---|---|---|
| Sunday, 1 October 2023 | 09:00 | Qualification round |
| Monday, 2 October 2023 | 11:10 | 1/8 eliminations |
| Friday, 6 October 2023 | 13:30 | Quarterfinals |
| Friday, 6 October 2023 | 15:10 | Semifinals |
| Friday, 6 October 2023 | 16:00 | Bronze medal match |
| Friday, 6 October 2023 | 16:25 | Gold medal match |

== Results ==
=== Qualification round ===
| Rank | Team | Half | | Total | 10s | Xs |
| Rank | Team | 1st | 2nd | Total | 10s | Xs |
|---|---|---|---|---|---|---|
| 1 | South Korea (KOR) | 1022 | 1026 | 2048 | 118 | 43 |
| | Kim Je-deok | 338 | 339 | 677 | 35 | 14 |
| | Kim Woo-jin | ~~339~~ | ~~336~~ | ~~675~~ | ~~38~~ | ~~17~~ |
| | Lee Woo-seok | 345 | 345 | 690 | 46 | 17 |
| | Oh Jin-hyek | 339 | 342 | 681 | 37 | 12 |
| 2 | Chinese Taipei (TPE) | 1016 | 1014 | 2030 | 111 | 39 |
| | Su Yu-yang | 334 | 339 | 673 | 33 | 8 |
| | Tai Yu-hsuan | ~~310~~ | ~~327~~ | ~~637~~ | ~~22~~ | ~~13~~ |
| | Tang Chih-chun | 349 | 338 | 687 | 46 | 16 |
| | Wei Chun-heng | 333 | 337 | 670 | 32 | 15 |
| 3 | India (IND) | 1022 | 1000 | 2022 | 106 | 37 |
| | Dhiraj Bommadevara | 344 | 331 | 675 | 40 | 12 |
| | Mrinal Chauhan | ~~329~~ | ~~338~~ | ~~667~~ | ~~32~~ | ~~16~~ |
| | Atanu Das | 343 | 335 | 678 | 36 | 14 |
| | Tushar Shelke | 335 | 334 | 669 | 30 | 11 |
| 4 | Iran (IRI) | 1007 | 1001 | 2008 | 97 | 27 |
| | Sadegh Ashrafi | 334 | 328 | 662 | 27 | 4 |
| | Mohammad Hossein Golshani | 338 | 331 | 669 | 31 | 11 |
| | Reza Shabani | 335 | 342 | 677 | 39 | 12 |
| 5 | Indonesia (INA) | 995 | 998 | 1993 | 87 | 29 |
| | Riau Ega Agata | 338 | 335 | 673 | 36 | 10 |
| | Ahmad Khoirul Baasith | 327 | 333 | 660 | 27 | 10 |
| | Arif Dwi Pangestu | 330 | 330 | 660 | 24 | 9 |
| | Alviyanto Prastyadi | ~~323~~ | ~~323~~ | ~~646~~ | ~~23~~ | ~~9~~ |
| 6 | China (CHN) | 993 | 998 | 1991 | 90 | 30 |
| | Li Zhongyuan | 327 | 326 | 653 | 23 | 6 |
| | Qi Xiangshuo | 335 | 333 | 668 | 33 | 11 |
| | Wang Dapeng | ~~324~~ | ~~319~~ | ~~643~~ | ~~15~~ | ~~5~~ |
| | Wei Shaoxuan | 331 | 339 | 670 | 34 | 13 |
| 7 | Bangladesh (BAN) | 975 | 988 | 1963 | 72 | 26 |
| | Sagor Islam | 326 | 336 | 662 | 25 | 10 |
| | Hakim Ahmed Rubel | ~~332~~ | ~~316~~ | ~~648~~ | ~~20~~ | ~~5~~ |
| | Ram Krishna Saha | 330 | 323 | 653 | 26 | 8 |
| | Ruman Shana | 319 | 329 | 648 | 21 | 8 |
| 8 | Kazakhstan (KAZ) | 980 | 977 | 1957 | 67 | 27 |
| | Ilfat Abdullin | 334 | 329 | 663 | 25 | 10 |
| | Sultan Duzelbayev | 321 | 319 | 640 | 16 | 7 |
| | Sanzhar Mussayev | ~~313~~ | ~~319~~ | ~~632~~ | ~~22~~ | ~~11~~ |
| | Dauletkeldi Zhangbyrbay | 325 | 329 | 654 | 26 | 10 |
| 9 | Japan (JPN) | 981 | 974 | 1955 | 70 | 16 |
| | Takaharu Furukawa | 329 | 331 | 660 | 27 | 4 |
| | Junya Nakanishi | 329 | 321 | 650 | 25 | 7 |
| | Fumiya Saito | 323 | 322 | 645 | 18 | 5 |
| 10 | Vietnam (VIE) | 971 | 978 | 1949 | 64 | 26 |
| | Hoàng Văn Lộc | ~~304~~ | ~~314~~ | ~~618~~ | ~~17~~ | ~~2~~ |
| | Lê Quốc Phong | 322 | 328 | 650 | 24 | 10 |
| | Nguyễn Đạt Mạnh | 317 | 322 | 639 | 16 | 8 |
| | Nguyễn Duy | 332 | 328 | 660 | 24 | 8 |
| 11 | Mongolia (MGL) | 968 | 962 | 1930 | 64 | 14 |
| | Batbayaryn Buyantüshig | 317 | 314 | 631 | 15 | 2 |
| | Dorjsürengiin Dashnamjil | ~~305~~ | ~~318~~ | ~~623~~ | ~~15~~ | ~~3~~ |
| | Jantsangiin Gantögs | 323 | 314 | 637 | 19 | 6 |
| | Baatarkhuyagiin Otgonbold | 328 | 334 | 662 | 30 | 6 |
| 12 | Malaysia (MAS) | 965 | 957 | 1922 | 60 | 9 |
| | Syafiq Busthamin | 328 | 311 | 639 | 20 | 4 |
| | Khairul Anuar Mohamad | 320 | 321 | 641 | 19 | 3 |
| | Danish Amsyar Norazlan | ~~320~~ | ~~312~~ | ~~632~~ | ~~20~~ | ~~5~~ |
| | Zarif Syahir Zolkepeli | 317 | 325 | 642 | 21 | 2 |
| 13 | Uzbekistan (UZB) | 957 | 959 | 1916 | 61 | 19 |
| | Chen Yao Yuy | 314 | 315 | 629 | 13 | 4 |
| | Mirjalol Mirolimov | 306 | 309 | 615 | 12 | 2 |
| | Amirkhon Sadikov | 337 | 335 | 672 | 36 | 13 |
| | Ozodbek Ungalov | ~~305~~ | ~~296~~ | ~~601~~ | ~~15~~ | ~~7~~ |
| 14 | Hong Kong (HKG) | 965 | 927 | 1892 | 60 | 15 |
| | Kwok Yin Chai | 329 | 322 | 651 | 24 | 7 |
| | Lucien Law | 316 | 313 | 629 | 19 | 2 |
| | Leung Cheuk Yin | ~~300~~ | ~~301~~ | ~~601~~ | ~~15~~ | ~~6~~ |
| | Wan Chun Kit | 320 | 292 | 612 | 17 | 6 |
| 15 | Thailand (THA) | 938 | 952 | 1890 | 58 | 16 |
| | Phonthakorn Chaisilp | 315 | 314 | 629 | 19 | 5 |
| | Tanapat Pathairat | 315 | 321 | 636 | 19 | 5 |
| | Witthaya Thamwong | 308 | 317 | 625 | 20 | 6 |
| | Denchai Thepna | ~~287~~ | ~~296~~ | ~~583~~ | ~~8~~ | ~~3~~ |
| 16 | North Korea (PRK) | 928 | 947 | 1875 | 51 | 13 |
| | Han Myong-gyu | 307 | 308 | 615 | 16 | 4 |
| | Kim Kuk-song | 307 | 316 | 623 | 16 | 5 |
| | Ri Tae-bom | 314 | 323 | 637 | 19 | 4 |
| 17 | Saudi Arabia (KSA) | 940 | 923 | 1863 | 46 | 11 |
| | Hatim Al-Hatim | ~~286~~ | ~~302~~ | ~~588~~ | ~~14~~ | ~~3~~ |
| | Abdulrahman Al-Musa | 316 | 318 | 634 | 17 | 3 |
| | Rashed Al-Subaie | 309 | 292 | 601 | 11 | 6 |
| | Mansour Alwi | 315 | 313 | 628 | 18 | 2 |
| 18 | Pakistan (PAK) | 908 | 916 | 1824 | 38 | 12 |
| | Asrar-ul-Haq | 312 | 322 | 634 | 19 | 6 |
| | Idrees Majeed | 299 | 295 | 594 | 10 | 3 |
| | Muhammad Nadeem | 297 | 299 | 596 | 9 | 3 |
| 19 | Tajikistan (TJK) | 888 | 903 | 1791 | 41 | 10 |
| | Abdumalik Ganiev | 282 | 296 | 578 | 10 | 2 |
| | Robert Nam | 332 | 323 | 655 | 26 | 6 |
| | Salimjon Salimov | 274 | 284 | 558 | 5 | 2 |
| 20 | Kuwait (KUW) | 876 | 837 | 1713 | 28 | 6 |
| | Abdullah Al-Harbi | 262 | 243 | 505 | 4 | 2 |
| | Ali Al-Zaid | 308 | 302 | 610 | 14 | 3 |
| | Abdulla Taha | 306 | 292 | 598 | 10 | 1 |

- Bangladesh replaced Ram Krishna Saha with Hakim Ahmed Rubel for the knockout round.

=== Knockout round ===
1/8 eliminations
1 | South Korea | 57 | 57 | 58 | 6
16 | North Korea | 54 | 56 | 52 | 0
9 | Japan | 55 | 56 | 57 | 5
8 | Kazakhstan | 53 | 56 | 54 | 1
5 | Indonesia | 55 | 56 | 55 | 55 | 5
12 | Malaysia | 55 | 52 | 56 | 53 | 3
13 | Uzbekistan | 54 | 53 | 47 | 0
4 | Iran | 57 | 59 | 54 | 6
3 | India | 58 | 57 | 57 | 6
14 | Hong Kong | 47 | 49 | 55 | 0
11 | Mongolia | 56 | 54 | 57 | 5
6 | China | 54 | 54 | 56 | 1
7 | Bangladesh | 57 | 57 | 57 | 53 | 28 | 5
10 | Vietnam | 49 | 57 | 57 | 54 | 25 | 4
15 | Thailand | 53 | 54 | 58 | 55 | 29 | 5
2 | Chinese Taipei | 57 | 57 | 55 | 54 | 28 | 4

Quarterfinals
1 | South Korea | 54 | 56 | 59 | 5
9 | Japan | 54 | 54 | 56 | 1
5 | Indonesia | 54 | 58 | 55 | 53 | 6
4 | Iran | 52 | 55 | 58 | 52 | 2
3 | India | 58 | 55 | 59 | 56 | 28 | 5
11 | Mongolia | 52 | 56 | 56 | 58 | 25 | 4
7 | Bangladesh | 55 | 55 | 57 | 54 | 28 | 5
15 | Thailand | 51 | 56 | 54 | 57 | 27 | 4

Semifinals
1 | South Korea | 57 | 58 | 58 | 6
5 | Indonesia | 56 | 53 | 55 | 0
3 | India | 58 | 57 | 56 | 57 | 5
7 | Bangladesh | 51 | 54 | 58 | 57 | 3

Gold medal match
1 | South Korea | 60 | 57 | 56 | 5
3 | India | 55 | 57 | 55 | 1
Bronze medal match
5 | Indonesia | 56 | 55 | 58 | 6
7 | Bangladesh | 55 | 54 | 54 | 0
