= 2025 Asian Archery Championships =

International archery tournament

- Host city: Dhaka, Bangladesh
- Organizers: World Archery Asia; Bangladesh Archery Federation
- Nations: 29 (207 competitors)
- Dates: 8–14 November 2025
- Venues: National Stadium; Bangladesh Army Stadium

The 2025 Asian Archery Championships was the 24th edition of the tournament, held in Dhaka, Bangladesh, from 8 to 14 November 2025. India finished as the most successful nation at the tournament.

== Participating nations ==
A total of 207 athletes from 29 nations competed in Asian Archery Championships:

1. Bangladesh (Hosts) (16)
2. Bhutan (8)
3. Chinese Taipei (12)
4. China (8)
5. Hong Kong (1)
6. Indonesia (4)
7. India (16)
8. Iran (16)
9. Iraq (6)
10. Jordan (1)
11. Kazakhstan (16)
12. Kyrgyzstan (2)
13. South Korea (16)
14. Lebanon (1)
15. Malaysia (15)
16. Nepal (2)
17. Pakistan (3)
18. Palestine (4)
19. Qatar (4)
20. Saudi Arabia (7)
21. Syria (1)
22. Sri Lanka (2)
23. Thailand (4)
24. Tajikistan (3)
25. Turkmenistan (5)
26. Timor-Leste (2)
27. United Arab Emirates (9)
28. Uzbekistan (6)
29. Vietnam (14)

== Medal summary ==
=== Recurve ===
Event	Gold	Silver	Bronze
Men's individual	India; Dhiraj Bommadevara	India; Rahul Pawariya	South Korea; Seo Mingi
Men's team	India; Atanu Das; Yashdeep Bhoge; Rahul Pawariya	South Korea; Seo Mingi; Kim Yeachan; Jang Jiho	Uzbekistan; Amirkhon Sadikov; Mukhammankodir Ergashev; Bekzod Boborajabov
Women's individual	India; Ankita Bhakat	South Korea; Nam Su-hyeon	India; Sangeeta
Women's team	South Korea; Jang Min-hee; Nam Su-hyeon; Kim Surin	Chinese Taipei; Li Tsai-chi; Kuo Tzu Ying; Fong You Jhu	Malaysia; Ariana Nur Diana Mohamad Zairi; Joey Tan Xing Lei; Ku Nurin Afiqah Ku Ruzaini
Mixed team	Chinese Taipei; Li Tsai-chi; Tai Yu-hsuan	Uzbekistan; Ziyodakhon Abdusattorova; Amirkhon Sadikov	South Korea; Jang Min-hee; Seo Mingi

=== Compound ===
Event	Gold	Silver	Bronze
Men's individual	South Korea; Lee Eun-ho	South Korea; Choi Yong-hee	Malaysia; Mohd Juwaidi Mazuki
Men's team	Kazakhstan; Dilmukhamet Mussa; Bunyod Mirzametov; Andrey Tyutyun	India; Abhishek Verma; Sahil Jadhav; Prathamesh Fuge	South Korea; Kim Jong-ho; Choi Yong-hee; Lee Eun-ho
Women's individual	India; Jyothi Surekha	India; Prithika Pradeep	Bangladesh; Most Kulsum Akther Mone
Women's team	India; Jyothi Surekha; Deepshikha; Prithika Pradeep	South Korea; Park Yerin; Oh Yoo-hyun; Jungyoon Park	Iran; Fatemeh Bagheri; Geesa Bybordy; Shiva Bakhtiari
Mixed team	India; Deepshikha; Abhishek Verma	Bangladesh; Bonna Akter; Himu Bachhar	South Korea; Park Yerin; Kim Jong-ho

== Medal table ==
* Host nation (Bangladesh)

Rank	Nation	Gold	Silver	Bronze	Total
1	India	6	3	1	10
2	South Korea	2	4	4	10
3	Chinese Taipei	1	1	0	2
4	Kazakhstan	1	0	0	1
5	Bangladesh*	0	1	1	2
5	Uzbekistan	0	1	1	2
7	Malaysia	0	0	2	2
8	Iran	0	0	1	1
Totals (8 entries)		10	10	10	30
