= Ojas Deotale =

Indian archer

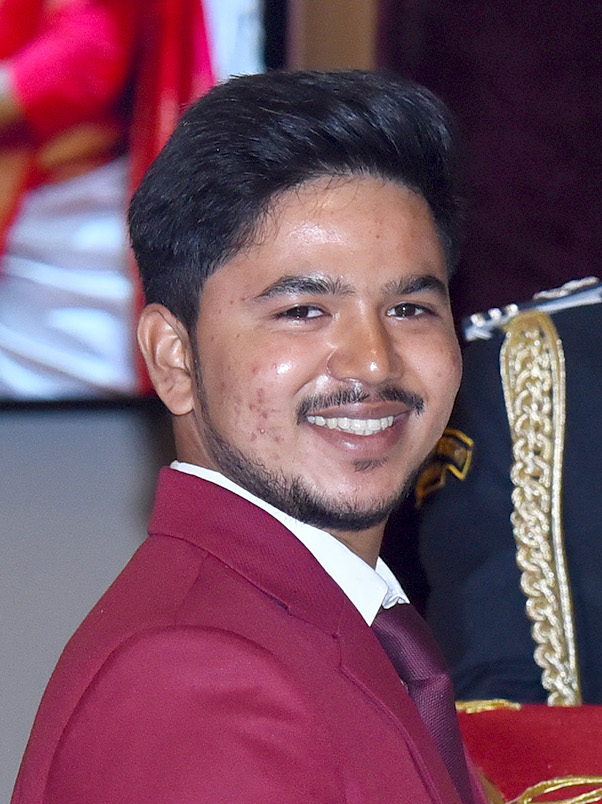
- Deotale in 2024

Personal information
- Full name: Ojas Pravin Deotale
- Nationality: Indian
- Born: 18 June 2002 (age 24) Nagpur, Maharashtra, India

Sport
- Sport: Archery
- Event: Compound
- Coached by: Sergio Pagni

Achievements and titles
- Highest world ranking: 4 (2023)
- Personal best: 150 AGR (2023), 713
Medal record
Men's compound archery
Representing India
World Championships
Gold medal – first place	2023 Berlin	Individual
World Cup
Gold medal – first place	2023 Paris	Team
Gold medal – first place	2023 Antalya	Mixed team
Gold medal – first place	2023 Shanghai	Mixed team
Gold medal – first place	2025 Shanghai	Team
Bronze medal – third place	2023 Medellín	Team
Bronze medal – third place	2025 Central Florida	Team
Asian Games
Gold medal – first place	2022 Hangzhou	Individual
Gold medal – first place	2022 Hangzhou	Mixed team
Gold medal – first place	2022 Hangzhou	Team
Asia Cup
Gold medal – first place	2022 Sharjah	Team
Silver medal – second place	2022 Sharjah	Individual

Ojas Pravin Deotale (born 18 June 2002) is an Indian compound archer. He won the gold medal in the men's individual compound event at the 2023 World Championships, becoming the first Indian male archer to achieve this feat.

== Early life ==
Deotale is from Nagpur. As a kid, he would fashion bowrows by dismaoms in his house, forcing his mother to buy extra brooms. Befe discovering archery, he was a rollerskater, having won medals at the Maharashtra state-level.

He finished his secondary schooling from Siddhivinayak School in Gumgaon, Nagpur.

== Training ==
Deotale discovered archery as a sport at a summer camp he attended as a 13-year-old in 2015. His parents soon enrolled him into an archery academy at Trimurti Nagar in Nagpur under the tutelage of Satyajeet Yelne where he started with the Indian bow before moving to recurve. Since the Trimurti Nagar academy lacked a target buttress, he moved to an academy in Tajbagh where he trained for 5–6 years at A-ZEE Sports Academy under the NIS Coach Mohammad Zeeshan Rafique where he came to know about Compound archery and became the first player to get national level medal at Uttarakhand. After that his A-ZEE sports shop has invested their own money for his equipment so that he can become world Champion as at that time his parents was unable to pay. He also stayed at his coach's home for more than 1 year to take training for free of cost as he was an elite student of academy has supposed him from every aspect. He was fully trained under the coach Mohammad Zeeshan at A-ZEE Sports Academy. For education purpose He moved to Pune for studying hotel management course.

To get around travel restrictions imposed during the first lockdown of the COVID-19 pandemic, Deotale stayed by himself for four months at his alma mater Siddhivinayak School where his father had installed a target buttress for him to practice. A school worker named Chaya Rakshak would bring him food from her home, while he began his training at 5AM with yoga and meditation.

During the second lockdown in 2021, Deotale initially rented a room near the Tajbagh academy but later went back to stay alone at the school.

In July 2022, Deotale moved to Satara to train at the Drushti Archery Academy under his current coach Pravin Sawant.

== Career ==
As on 14 August 2023, Deotale's average arrow score over his career is 9.72, and his current and career best world ranking is 9.

=== Indian Archery Junior Team Trials 2022 ===
At the Indian Junior team selection held in Sonipat, Deotale scored 1,423 and 1,427 out of 1,440, breaking the Junior World Record of 1419 set by Mike Schloesser in 2014.

=== Sharjah 2022 Asia Cup, Leg 3 ===
In December 2022, Deotale made his debut for the senior India team winning the individual silver and team gold for India in the men's compound event. Before his senior debut, Deotale had an accident in Pune that fractured his leg causing the Indian team coach to question his fitness for Sharjah. Deotale however, passed the fitness test despite the fracture.

=== 2023 Archery World Cup ===
Deotale and his compound mixed team partner Jyothi Surekha Vennam won gold at the World Cup Stage 1 in Antalya and the World Cup Stage 2 in Shanghai.

=== 2023 World Archery Championships ===
At the 2023 World Archery Championships, Deotale beat Poland’s Przemyslaw Konecki 148-144 in the quarterfinals, and former world champion Dutch archer Mike Schloesser in the semifinals. He scored a perfect 150 in the finals to beat Poland’s Lukasz Przybylski 150-149.

He got off to a poor start at Berlin, blaming his performance on wind conditions. Recounting their conversation about the competition, his mother Archana said, "I told him if you are unable to perform and want to give excuses then better leave the sport. For the next two days he didn't speak to me. But after becoming world champion, he called me to tell me that your face was my target and I was spot-on."

== Personal life ==
Deotale lives a focused life, staying away from television, social media, and socialising with friends. His coach describes him as down-to-earth and highly disciplined.

== Awards ==
Arjuna Award 2023.
