= Tushar Shelke =

Indian archer

Personal information
- Full name: Tushar Prabhakar Shelke
- Nationality: Indian
- Born: 30 January 1995 (age 31)
- Height: 1.81 m (5 ft 11 in)
Medal record
Men's archery
Representing India
Asian Games
Silver medal – second place	2022 Hangzhou	Team recurve

Tushar Prabhakar Shelke (born 30 January 1995) is an Indian archer. He represents India in the recurve men's individual and team events. He is selected for the Indian Archery team to take part in the 2022 Asian Games at Hangzhou, China. The Indian Men's recurve team consisting of Atanu Das, Dhiraj Bommadevara and Tushar Shelke won the silver medal at the 2022 Asian Games.

== Career ==
Tushar began his international career with the university games when he first did well at the Gwangju Summer Universiade. Later, he represented the country in various tournaments and was part of the recent teams that won bronze medals in the three World Cups in 2023 that served as the qualification meets for the World Championships. In 2023, he also won a gold medal at the Asian Grand Prix Circuit. He took part in the men's recurve team and individual events at the World Championships in Berlin, Germany. Later in the same year, he won a bronze in the men's recurve team and individual events at the World Championships in Berlin, Germany. He also won two other bronze medals at the World Cup Stage 3 in Medelin, Colombia Men's individual and Mixed team events. India also won a bronze in the Men's recurve team at the World Cup Stage 4 in Paris, France where Tushar was also part of the team.
