= Abhishek Verma (archer) =

Indian archer (born 1989)

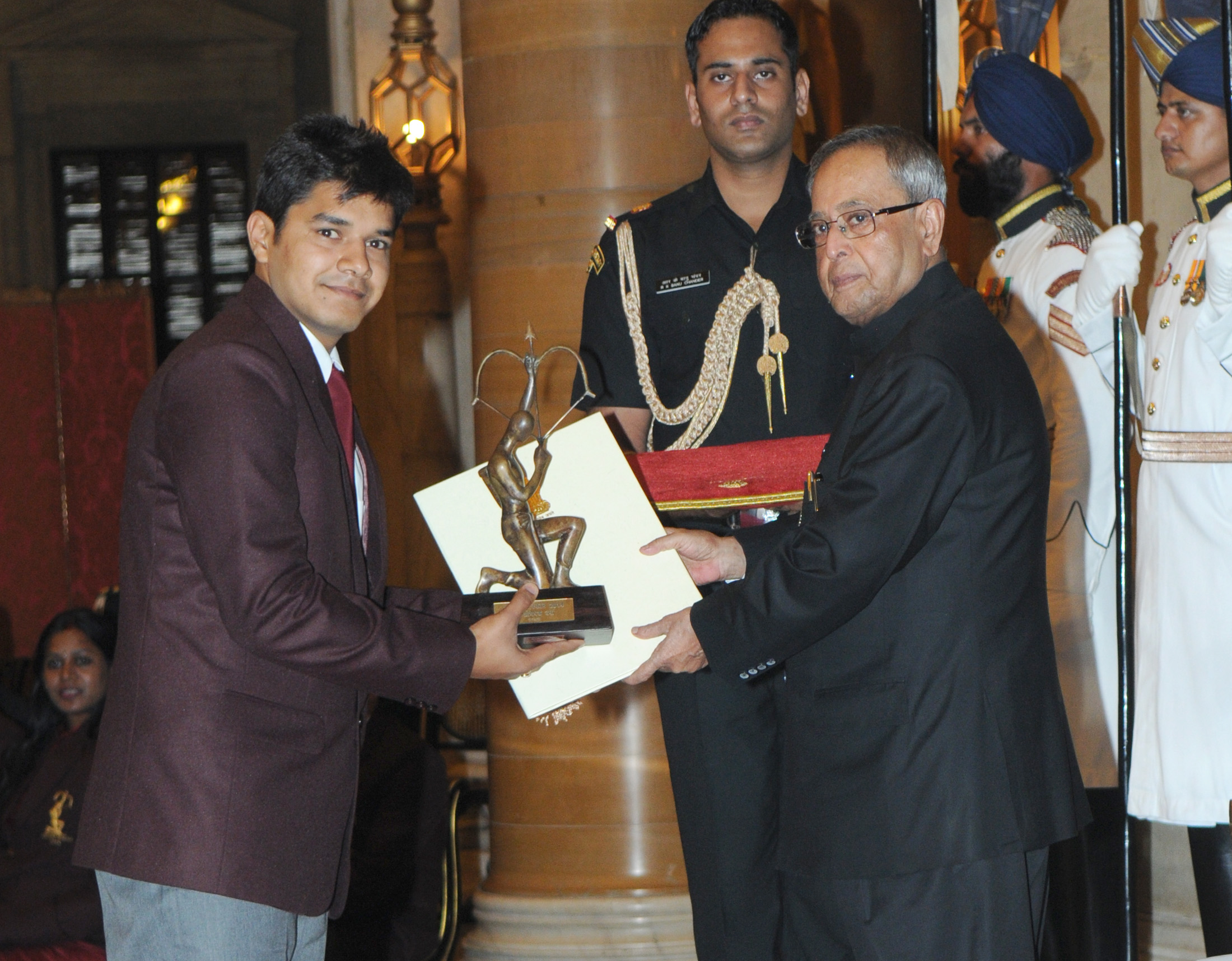
- Verma (left) receiving the 2014 Arjuna Award from President Pranab Mukherjee

Personal information
- Born: 26 June 1989 (age 36) New Delhi, India
- Education: Hansraj College
- Occupation: Assistant Commissioner
- Employer: Income Tax Department
- Height: 1.72 m (5 ft 8 in)

Sport
- Sport: Archery
- Event: Compound
Medal record
Men's compound archery
Representing India
World Championships
Silver medal – second place	2021 Yankton	Mixed team
Asian Games
Gold medal – first place	2014 Incheon	Team
Gold medal – first place	2022 Hangzhou	Team
Silver medal – second place	2014 Incheon	Individual
Silver medal – second place	2018 Jakarta	Team
Silver medal – second place	2022 Hangzhou	Individual
Asian Championships
Gold medal – first place	2013 Taipei	Individual
Gold medal – first place	2013 Taipei	Mixed team
Gold medal – first place	2013 Taipei	Team
Gold medal – first place	2015 Bangkok	Team
Gold medal – first place	2017 Dhaka	Individual
Gold medal – first place	2019 Bangkok	Mixed team
Gold medal – first place	2025 Dhaka	Mixed team
Silver medal – second place	2017 Dhaka	Team
Silver medal – second place	2017 Dhaka	Mixed team
Silver medal – second place	2019 Bangkok	Team
Silver medal – second place	2021 Dhaka	Individual
Silver medal – second place	2025 Dhaka	Team
Bronze medal – third place	2021 Dhaka	Team
Bronze medal – third place	2023 Bangkok	Individual
Bronze medal – third place	2023 Bangkok	Team
World Cup
Gold medal – first place	2015 Wroclaw	Individual
Gold medal – first place	2018 Shanghai	Team
Gold medal – first place	2021 Paris	Individual
Gold medal – first place	2022 Antalya	Team
Gold medal – first place	2023 Medellín	Individual
Gold medal – first place	2023 Paris	Team
Gold medal – first place	2025 Shanghai	Team
Silver medal – second place	2014 Wroclaw	Mixed team
Silver medal – second place	2015 Mexico City	Individual
Silver medal – second place	2018 Samsun	Mixed team
Bronze medal – third place	2018 Samsun	Individual
Bronze medal – third place	2015 Shanghai	Team
Bronze medal – third place	2017 Antalya	Mixed team
Bronze medal – third place	2018 Antalya	Team
Bronze medal – third place	2018 Berlin	Mixed team
Bronze medal – third place	2018 Salt lake City	Mixed team
Bronze medal – third place	2018 Antalya	Mixed team
Bronze medal – third place	2018 Shanghai	Mixed team
Bronze medal – third place	2023 Medellín	Team
Bronze medal – third place	2025 Central Florida	Team
Bronze medal – third place	2025 Shanghai	Mixed team

Abhishek Verma (born 26 June 1989) is an Indian compound archer. He has won multiple medals at the Asian Games, World Cup and Asian Championships, including a silver in the mixed team event at the 2021 World Championships. He became the first Indian archer to score a perfect 600 in an international competition, achieving the feat at the 2024 GT Open. Verma is a recipient of the Arjuna Award, conferred in 2014 for his achievements in archery. He currently serves as the deputy chairperson of World Archery.

== Early life ==
Verma was born in New Delhi. While he was studying in a government school in Model Town in Delhi, he asked his physical training teacher regarding which sports he must play and the teacher suggested he must take up the archery. Abhishek, an alumnus of Hansraj College, significantly contributed to the college's archery program. Verma works as an income tax Asst. Commissioner in the Income Tax Department.

== Awards ==
- Arjuna Award (2014)
