= Wang Dapeng =

Chinese recurve archer (born 1996)

Personal information
- Born: 3 December 1996 (age 29) Huangdao, Qingdao, Shandong, China
- Height: 184 cm (6 ft 0 in)
- Weight: 95 kg (209 lb)

Sport
- Country: China
- Sport: Archery
- Event: Recurve
Medal record
Men's recurve archery
Representing China
Asian Championships
Bronze medal – third place	2017 Dhaka	Individual

Wang Dapeng (Chinese: 王大鹏; born 3 December 1996) is a Chinese recurve archer from Huangdao District in Qingdao. He represented China in the archery competition at the 2016 Summer Olympics in Rio de Janeiro and the 2020 Summer Olympics in Tokyo.

== Early life ==
In elementary school, Wang Dapeng was selected by the Qingdao Huangdao District Archery Team. In 2008, Wang Dapeng entered Qingdao Sports School to learn archery, and his coach was Qu Yuefeng. In the first two years after entering Qingdao Sports School, Wang Dapeng could only practice bow-drawing and running because he was too young.

== Career ==
In 2014, Wang Dapeng won the championship in the individual archery competition of the 23rd Shandong Province Games and was selected for the Shandong Province Archery Team.

On 29 January 2021, Wang Dapeng was selected as the top ten athletes in Qingdao in 2020. In April, Wang Dapeng officially qualified for the 2020 Tokyo Olympics. On 23 July, in the 2020 Tokyo Olympics Archery Men's Individual Ranking Competition, Wang Dapeng ranked 13th with a score of 668 rings and advanced to the next round. On 24 July, in the 1/8 finals of the archery mixed team at the 2020 Tokyo Olympics, the Chinese team composed of Wang Dapeng and Wu Jiaxin lost to the British team with a total score of 3-5 and missed the top 8. On 26 July, in the quarter-finals of the men's archery team at the 2020 Tokyo Olympics, the Chinese team composed of Wang Dapeng, Wei Shaoxuan and Li Jialun lost to the Chinese Taipei team with a total score of 1-5 and stopped in the top 8. On 28 July, in the second round of the 2020 Tokyo Olympics archery men's individual knockout competition, Wang Dapeng lost to Malaysian player Mohammad Hailul Anoor with a total score of 5-6 and missed the top 16.

In March 2022, he will participate in the 2022 National Archery Championship in Dongfang, Hainan. On 22 September, at the 2022 National Archery Championships, Wang Dapeng/Zhang Mengyao won the mixed team bronze medal. In March, he was selected into the final team of the national archery team for the 2023 World Cup.In May, Wang Dapeng participated in the 2023 Archery World Cup Shanghai.
