= Bhutan at the 2022 Asian Games =

- IOC code: BHU
- NOC: Bhutan Olympic Committee

in Hangzhou, China 23 September 2023 – 8 October 2023
- Competitors: 26 (10 men and 16 women) in 10 sports
- Flag bearers: Lenchu Kunzang; Tandin Wangchuk
- Medals: Gold 0 Silver 0 Bronze 0 Total 0

Asian Games appearances (overview)
- 1986; 1990; 1994; 1998; 2002; 2006; 2010; 2014; 2018; 2022; 2026

Bhutan competed at the 2022 Asian Games in Hangzhou, Zhejiang, China, which began on 23 September 2023 and ended on 8 October 2023. The event was scheduled to be held in September 2022 but was postponed due to the rising COVID-19 cases in China. The event was later rescheduled to be held in September–October 2023.

The Bhutanese delegation for this edition was the largest ever for the country at the Asian Games. Bhutan could not win a medal at the game.

== Competitors ==
The following is the list of sports and numbers of athletes which participated at the 2022 Asian Games:

Sport	Men	Women	Total
Archery	2	4	6
Athletics	0	1	1
Badminton	2	0	2
Boxing	3	0	3
Golf	1	0	1
Judo	0	3	3
Karate	0	2	2
Shooting	1	1	2
Swimming	0	2	2
Taekwondo	1	3	4
Total	10	16	26

== Medalists ==
=== Medals by sport ===
Medals by sport
Sport	Gold	Silver	Bronze	Total
Archery	0	0	0	0
Total	0	0	0	0

== Badminton ==
Bhutan had two badminton players for the 2022 Asian Games.

Men

Athlete	Event	Round of 64	Round of 32	Round of 16	Quarter-finals	Semi-finals	Final	
Athlete	Event	Opposition Score	Opposition Score	Opposition Score	Opposition Score	Opposition Score	Opposition Score	Rank
Jimba Sangay Lhendup	Singles	Panarin (KAZ); L (3–21, 3–21)	Did not advance					
Anish Gurung	Singles	Nettasinghe (SRI); L (6–21, 14–21)	Did not advance					
Jimba Sangay Lhendup; Anish Gurung	Doubles	Supak Jomkoh / Kittinupong Kedren (THA); L (4–21, 4–21)	Did not advance					

== Boxing ==
Bhutan has three athletes competing in boxing at the 2022 Asian Games.

Men

Athlete	Event	Round of 32	Round of 16	Quarterfinals	Semifinals	Final	Rank
Athlete	Event	Opposition Result	Opposition Result	Opposition Result	Opposition Result	Opposition Result	Rank
Tenzin Drugyel	51 kg	Popalzai (AFG); L 2–3	Did not advance				
Tashi Yoezer	57 kg	Abusal (JOR); L 0–5	Did not advance				
Dorji Wangdi	63.5 kg	Fajardo (PHI); L KO R1	Did not advance				

== Golf ==
Tshendra Dorji was the sole golfer entered by Bhutan in the 2022 Asian Games. He was selected for his performance at the 2023 Bhutan Open Championship. Tshendra was not able to advance from the second round.

Men

Athlete	Event	Round 1	Round 2	Round 3	Round 4	Total	Par	Rank
Tshendra Dorji	Individual	80	78	Did not advance		158	+14	T69
