= Prathamesh Jawkar =

Indian archer

Personal information
- Full name: Prathamesh Samadhan Jawkar
- Nationality: Indian
- Born: 8 September 2003 (age 22) Alampur, Buldhana district, Maharashtra

Sport
- Sport: Archery
- Event: Compound

Achievements and titles
- Personal best: 710
Medal record
Men's compound archery
Representing India
World Cup Final
Silver medal – second place	2023 Hermosillo	Individual
World Cup
Gold medal – first place	2023 Shanghai	Individual
Gold medal – first place	2023 Paris	Team
Bronze medal – third place	2023 Medellín	Team
Asian Games
Gold medal – first place	2022 Hangzhou	Team
Asia Cup
Gold medal – first place	2024 Baghdad	Individual
Gold medal – first place	2024 Baghdad	Mixed team
Gold medal – first place	2024 Baghdad	Team
Gold medal – first place	2022 Sulaymaniyah	Team
Silver medal – second place	2022 Phuket	Team
Bronze medal – third place	2022 Sulaymaniyah	Individual

Prathamesh Samadhan Jawkar (born 8 September 2003) is an Indian compound archer. He was a part of the compound team that won the gold medal in the 2022 Asian Games.

He is currently suspended from active competition for a period of 2 years upto April 2028 due to three whereabouts failures.
