= Dhiraj Bommadevara =

Indian recurve archer (born 2001)

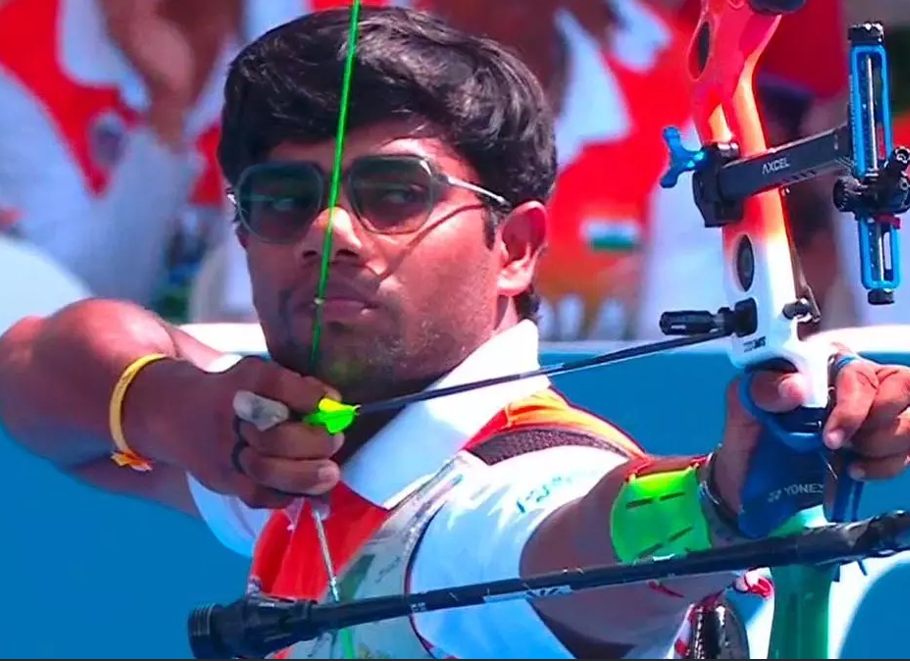
- Dhiraj Bommadevara at the 2026 Archery World Cup

Personal information
- Born: 4 September 2001 (age 25) Vijayawada, Andhra Pradesh, India
- Military career
- Branch: Indian Army
- Rank: Subedar

Sport
- Sport: Archery
- Event: Recurve

Achievements and titles
- Highest world ranking: 4
Medal record
Men's recurve archery
Representing India
Asian Games
Silver medal – second place	2022 Hangzhou	Team
Silver medal – second place	2026 Aichi–Nagoya	Mixed team
Silver medal – second place	2026 Aichi–Nagoya	Team
Asian Championships
Gold medal – first place	2025 Dhaka	Individual
World Cup Final
Gold medal – first place	2026 Saltillo	Individual
World Cup
Gold medal – first place	2024 Shanghai	Team
Gold medal – first place	2026 Antalya	Mixed team
Gold medal – first place	2026 Antalya	Individual
Silver medal – second place	2023 Antalya	Team
Silver medal – second place	2025 Central Florida	Team
Bronze medal – third place	2023 Antalya	Individual
Bronze medal – third place	2023 Medellín	Team
Bronze medal – third place	2023 Paris	Team
Bronze medal – third place	2024 Shanghai	Mixed team
Bronze medal – third place	2024 Antalya	Mixed team
Bronze medal – third place	2024 Antalya	Individual
Bronze medal – third place	2025 Central Florida	Individual
Asia Cup
Gold medal – first place	2024 Baghdad	Individual
Gold medal – first place	2024 Baghdad	Team
Gold medal – first place	2024 Baghdad	Mixed team
Silver medal – second place	2018 Bangkok	Team
World Youth Championships
Gold medal – first place	2021 Wraclow	Team
Asian Junior Championship
Silver medal – second place	2017 Bhubaneshwar	Team

Dhiraj Bommadevara (born 4 September 2001) is an Indian recurve archer. Dhiraj competed at the 2024 Olympics, where he narrowly missed the podium, finishing fourth in the recurve mixed team event.

== Personal life ==
Dhiraj hails from Vijayawada in Andhra Pradesh. His father Bommadevara Shravan Kumar used to be a technical official at the Archery Association of India. He studied at the SRR and CVR Government Degree College, Vijayawada. His archery career began at the Volga Archery Academy in Vijayawada in 2006, under the guidance of Cherukuri Satyanarayana. He joined the Indian Army in 2021 as a Havaldar, after training at the ASI in Pune for four years. He is backed by the Olympic Gold Quest (OGQ).

== Career ==
Accolades

Dhiraj, alongside Parth Salunkhe and Aditya Choudhary had secured a gold medal in the 2021 World Archery Youth Championships, defeating Spain 5–3 in the finals.

Dhiraj was selected to represent India at the 2022 Asian Games at Hangzhou, China. He had broken the 1440 WR, eclipsing Brady Ellison's record of 1376 by scoring 1386. He took part in the Men's recurve team event (alongside Atanu Das and Tushar Shelke) and won the silver medal at the 2022 Asian Games.

In 2023, he represented India at the World Championships in Berlin, Germany where he finished 2nd in the Ranking stages, but had a shock exit in the round of 16. In the same year, he also won Men's team Silver and Men's individual Bronze at the World Cup at Antalya, Turkey (Defeating Brady Ellison in the round of 16). In September 2023, he took part in the Archery World Cup Finals at Hermosillo, Mexico crushing 5-time Olympic Champion Kim Woo-jin and finishing 4th overall. Dhiraj, alongside Ankita Bhakat, won the mixed team bronze medal at Shanghai in 2024.

=== 2024 Summer Olympics ===
Dhiraj made his debut Olympic appearance at the 2024 Summer Olympics. After the ranking round, Dhiraj finished 4th (with a score of 681), making this the second best ranking score by an Indian archer in the Olympic Games. However, he lost 5-6 (10-10+) to Canada's Eric Peters in a closely fought Men's Individual 1/16 Elimination Round. Dhiraj advanced to the quarterfinals in the Men's Team, along with Pravin Jadhav and veteran Tarundeep Rai. However, the team succumbed to defeat in the Quarters against Turkey.

Dhiraj scripted history, with Ankita Bhakat by competing in India's first-ever Olympic medal match in archery in the Mixed Team Bronze Medal Match but lost 2–6 to the USA featuring Brady Ellison and Casey Kaufhold.

=== Post-Olympics ===
Dhiraj secured a Men's team silver (alongside Atanu Das and Tarundeep Rai) and an individual Bronze (defeating soon-to-be world champion Andrés Temiño) during the first stage of the Archery World Cup in Florida. He'd face a slump, though, losing tight matches in the upcoming stages of the World Cup and World Championships. However, during the 2025 Asian Archery Championships, Dhiraj secured a historic gold medal, defeating compatriot Rahul Pawariya 6–2, making him the first-ever Male Recurve champion from India (despite failing to qualify for any team events).

=== 2026 ===
Dhiraj qualified to represent the nation at the 2026 Asian Games, by finishing first in the selection trials. In June, he won his first gold medal of the season in the mixed team event at the 3rd stage of the 2026 Archery World Cup in Antalya. Later that day, he won his maiden men's individual World Cup title of his career in the Archery World Cup, defeating Lee Woo Seok 7–3, making him the first Indian male archer to win both the individual and mixed team titles in the same stage. He won the Recurve Mixed team gold medal, alongside Sangeeta, in the 5th CISM World Military Archery Championships.

On September 13 in Saltillo, Mexico, Dhiraj defeated Turkey's Olympic medallist Berkim Tümer 7–1 before advancing past France's Jean-Charles Valladont 7-1 and narrowly taking the gold medal from Japan's Nakanishi Junya 6–5, making history by becoming the first Indian male archer to claim a gold medal at the Archery World Cup Final.
