= Atanu Das =

Indian archer (born 1992)

Personal information
- Born: 5 April 1992 (age 34) Baranagar, West Bengal, India
- Employer: Bharat Petroleum
- Spouse: Deepika Kumari (m. 2020)

Sport
- Sport: Archery
- Event: Recurve
Medal record
Men's recurve archery
Representing India
World Championships
Silver medal – second place	2019 's-Hertogenbosch	Team
Asian Games
Silver medal – second place	2022 Hangzhou	Team
Asian Championships
Gold medal – first place	2025 Dhaka	Team
Silver medal – second place	2017 Dhaka	Team
Bronze medal – third place	2019 Bangkok	Individual
Bronze medal – third place	2019 Bangkok	Team
Bronze medal – third place	2019 Bangkok	Mixed Team
World Cup
Gold medal – first place	2021 Guatemala City	Individual
Gold medal – first place	2021 Paris	Mixed Team
Silver medal – second place	2014 Wroclaw	Team
Silver medal – second place	2014 Medellin	Team
Silver medal – second place	2025 Central Florida	Men's Team
Bronze medal – third place	2014 Medellin	Mixed Team
Bronze medal – third place	2013 Medellin	Mixed Team
Bronze medal – third place	2021 Guatemala City	Mixed Team
World University Championships
Silver medal – second place	2014 Legnica	Mixed Team
World Youth Championships
Silver medal – second place	2011 Legnica	Team

Atanu Das (born 5 April 1992) is an Indian archer. He represents India in the recurve men's individual and team events.

== Career ==
Das started archery at the age of 14 under the coaching of Mithu Da. In 2008, he moved to Tata Archery Academy where he was trained under the Korean coach Lim Chae Wong. He made his international debut in 2008.

Das won the bronze medal, with Deepika Kumari, in the 2013 World Cup mixed team event organized in Colombia.

Deepika Kumari and Atanu Das beat Sjef van den Berg and Gabriela Schloesser of Netherlands and fetch India a third gold medal at the World Cup.

In the men's team event at the 2020 Summer Olympics, Atanu Das was a member of Team India, which got knocked out by Team South Korea in the quarter-finals. However, in the Men's individual event, he managed to reach the Round of 8 after upsetting 3rd seed Oh Jin-hyek in the Round of 16. In this Atanu Das got praised from the Olympic Gold Medalist Oh Jin Hyek. Oh Jin Hyek said, “While it may appear to be an excuse, it is quite different from what it appears to be in a gust of wind,” Jin-hyek said. “Atanu is a great player. I wasn't any better than he was.” This is according to one article by Good Morning Mumbai website.

== Personal life ==
Atanu Das was born on 5 April 1992 in Baranagar, West Bengal, India. He did his education in Baranagar Narendranath Vidyamandir, Baranagar. He is employed with Bharat Petroleum Sports Promotion Board, Kolkata.

Atanu Das married Deepika Kumari on June 30, 2020, in Ranchi.

== Other achievements ==
- (silver) Recurve Men's Individual, Senior National Archery Championships, India 2014
- (bronze) Recurve Men's Team, Asian Archery Grand Prix, Thailand, 2013. [with Rahul Banerjee and Binod Swansi]
- (bronze) Recurve Mixed Team, Asian Archery Grand Prix, Thailand, 2013 [with Bombayla Devi Laishram].
- (bronze) Recurve Men's Individual, Asian Archery Grand Prix, Thailand, 2013.
- (gold) Recurve Mixed Team, 3rd Asian Grand Prix, Dhaka, Bangladesh, 2011 [with Rimil Buriuly].
- (bronze) Bronze Medalist, Recurve Men's Team, 3rd Asian Grand Prix, Dhaka, Bangladesh, 2011
- (gold) Recurve Men's Individual, 3rd Asian Grand Prix, Dhaka, Bangladesh, 2011
- (gold) Recurve Men's Team, 34th National Games, Jamshedpur, India 2011
- (bronze) Recurve Men's Team, 31st Sahara Senior National Archery Championships, Vijaywada, India 2011
- (silver) Recurve Junior Men's Team Men, Youth World Championship, Poland 2011
- (gold) Recurve Boys' Team, 33rd Junior National Archery Championships, New Delhi, India 2010

== Awards ==
- The Times of India TOISA Archer of the Year: 2021
